= Chely Wright discography =

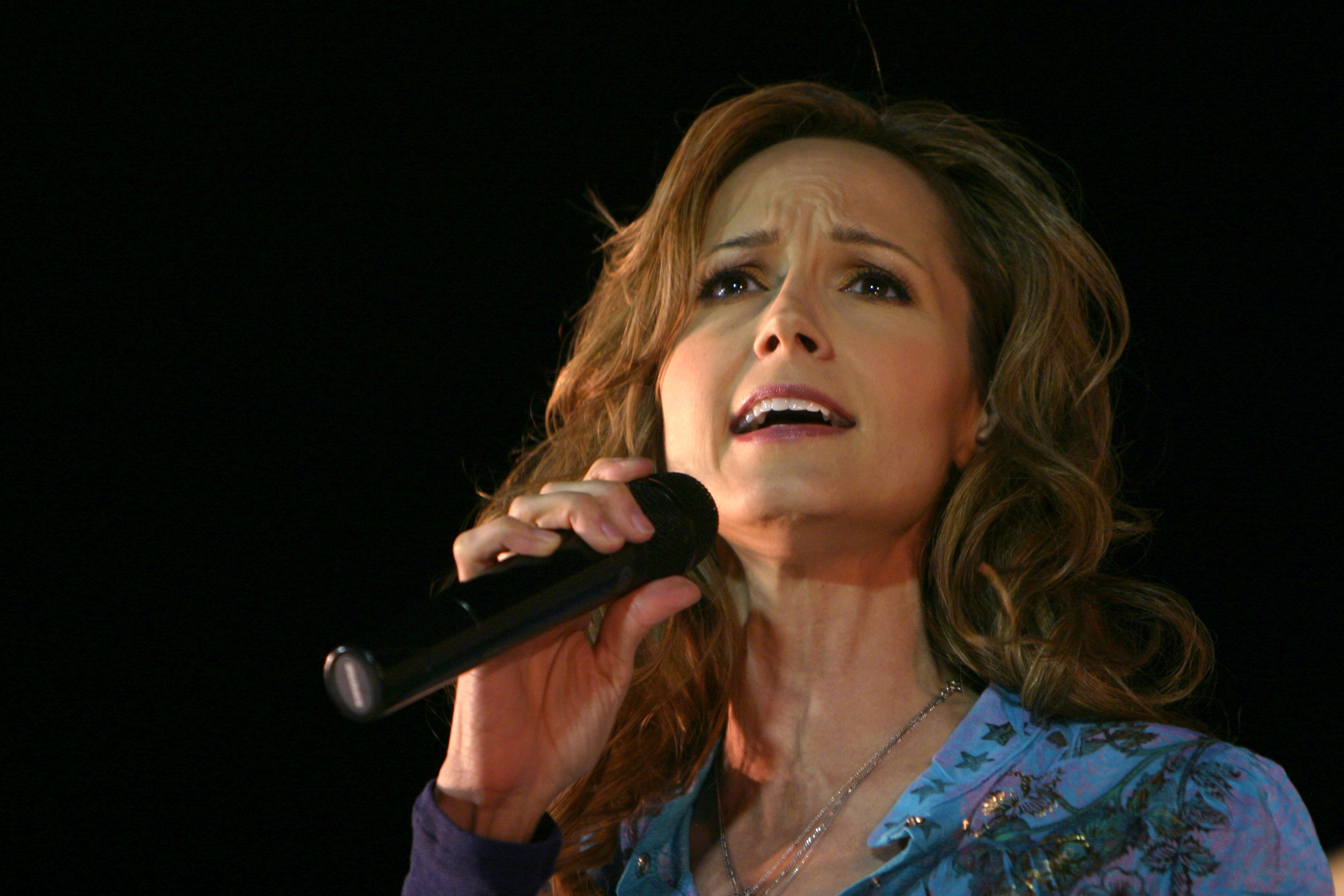
- Chely Wright in concert, 2009.
- Studio albums: 8
- Extended plays: 4
- Compilation albums: 3
- Singles: 24
- Video albums: 1
- Music videos: 18
- Other appearances: 6
- Other charted songs: 1

American country music artist Chely Wright has released eight studio albums, three compilation albums, one video album, four extended plays, 24 singles, 18 music videos, and appeared on six albums. Wright first issued two unsuccessful studio albums under Polydor Records: Woman in the Moon (1994) and Right in the Middle of It (1996). Both albums were critically acclaimed despite their lack of success. Her third studio album Let Me In (1997) reached number 25 on the Billboard Top Country Albums chart and spawned the hit single "Shut Up and Drive". It was Wright's fourth studio album that brought forth her biggest success, Single White Female. Released in May 1999, it reached number 15 on the country albums chart, number 124 on the Billboard 200, and certified gold from the Recording Industry Association of America. The title track reached the top of the Billboard Hot Country Songs chart in 1999 and was followed by the top 20 hit "It Was".

Wright's fifth studio record Never Love You Enough (2001) reached the top 10 of the Billboard Top Country Albums chart. Both the title track and "Jezebel" were top 30 hit singles on the country songs chart. After releasing an extended play, Wright launched her sixth studio album in February 2005, The Metropolitan Hotel. She took a five-year hiatus between the latter and her seventh studio album Lifted Off the Ground (2010). Spending 13 weeks on the country albums chart, it peaked at number 32 and also charted within the Billboard 200. In 2016, her eighth studio album was released titled I Am the Rain. The project peaked at number 13 on the country albums chart. Chely Wright has sold over one million records according to Nielsen Soundscan.

== Albums ==
=== Studio albums ===
List of studio albums, with selected chart positions, certifications, and other relevant details
| Title | Album details | Peak chart positions | | | | | Certifications |
| Title | Album details | US | US Cou. | US Ind. | CAN Cou. | UK Cou. | Certifications |
|---|---|---|---|---|---|---|---|
| Woman in the Moon | Released: August 9, 1994; Label: PolyGram/Mercury; Formats: Cassette, CD | — | — | — | — | — | |
| Right in the Middle of It | Released: January 9, 1996; Label: PolyGram/Mercury; Formats: Cassette, CD | — | — | — | — | — | |
| Let Me In | Released: September 9, 1997; Label: MCA Nashville; Formats: Cassette, CD | 171 | 25 | — | 23 | 7 | |
| Single White Female | Released: May 18, 1999; Label: MCA Nashville; Formats: Cassette, CD | 124 | 15 | — | 16 | 8 | RIAA: Gold |
| Never Love You Enough | Released: September 25, 2001; Label: MCA Nashville; Formats: Cassette, CD | 62 | 4 | — | — | 7 | |
| The Metropolitan Hotel | Released: February 22, 2005; Label: Dualtone/Painted Red; Formats: CD, music download | 96 | 18 | 7 | — | 3 | |
| Lifted Off the Ground | Released: May 4, 2010; Label: EMI/Vanguard; Formats: CD, music download | 200 | 32 | 35 | — | 8 | |
| I Am the Rain | Released: September 9, 2016; Label: MRI/Sony/Painted Red; Formats: CD, music download | 181 | 13 | 17 | — | — | |
"—" denotes a recording that did not chart or was not released in that territory.

=== Compilation albums ===
List of compilation albums, showing relevant details
| Title | Album details |
|---|---|
| 20th Century Masters – The Millennium Collection | Released: September 23, 2003; Label: MCA Nashville; Formats: CD, music download |
| The Definitive Collection | Released: March 13, 2007; Label: MCA Nashville; Formats: CD, music download |
| The Ultimate Collection | Released: October 6, 2008; Label: Humphead; Formats: CD |

== Extended plays ==
List of extended plays, showing relevant details
| Title | Album details | Peak chart positions | | Sales |
| Title | Album details | US Ind. | US Hol. | Sales |
|---|---|---|---|---|
| Everything | Released: October 26, 2004; Label: Painted Red; Formats: CD | — | — | |
| Damn Liar – The Dance Remix | Released: March 29, 2011; Label: Vanguard; Formats: Music download | — | — | |
| Santa Will Find You! | Released: October 26, 2018; Label: Painted Red; Formats: CD, digital download | 33 | 26 | US: 1,200 |
| Revival | Released: May 10, 2019; Label: Painted Red; Formats: CD, digital download | — | — | |
"—" denotes a recording that did not chart or was not released in that territory.

== Singles ==
=== As lead artist ===
List of singles, with selected chart positions and other relevant details
| Title | Year | Peak chart positions | | | Album |
| Title | Year | US | US Cou. | CAN Cou. | Album |
|---|---|---|---|---|---|
| "He's a Good Ole Boy" | 1994 | — | 58 | 55 | Woman in the Moon |
| "Till I Was Loved by You" | 1994 | — | 48 | 66 | Woman in the Moon |
| "Sea of Cowboy Hats" | 1995 | — | 56 | 74 | Woman in the Moon |
| "Listening to the Radio" | 1995 | — | 66 | 84 | Right in the Middle of It |
| "The Love That We Lost" | 1996 | — | 41 | 51 | Right in the Middle of It |
| "The Love He Left Behind" | 1996 | — | — | — | Right in the Middle of It |
| "Shut Up and Drive" | 1997 | — (Note: "Shut Up and Drive" did not enter the Hot 100, but charted at number 12 on U.S. Billboard Bubbling Under Hot 100 Singles.) | 14 | 21 | Let Me In |
| "Just Another Heartache" | 1997 | — | 39 | 51 | Let Me In |
| "I Already Do" | 1998 | — | 36 | 59 | Let Me In |
| "Single White Female" | 1999 | 36 | 1 | 1 | Single White Female |
| "It Was" | 1999 | 64 | 11 | 37 | Single White Female |
| "She Went Out for Cigarettes" | 2000 | — | 49 | 84 | Single White Female |
| "Never Love You Enough" | 2001 | — | 26 | — | Never Love You Enough |
| "Jezebel" | 2001 | — | 23 | — | Never Love You Enough |
| "Back of the Bottom Drawer" | 2004 | — | 40 | — | Everything |
| "The Bumper of My SUV" | 2004 | — | 54 | — | The Metropolitan Hotel |
| "The Bumper of My SUV" (re-release) | 2005 | — | 35 | — | The Metropolitan Hotel |
| "The River" | 2005 | — | — | — | The Metropolitan Hotel |
| "C'est La Vie (You Never Can Tell)" | 2005 | — | — | — | The Metropolitan Hotel |
| "Broken" | 2010 | — | — | — | Lifted Off the Ground |
| "Damn Liar" (dance remix) | 2011 | — | — | — | Damn Liar – The Dance Remix |
| "What About Your Heart" | 2016 | — | — | — | I Am the Rain |
| "Say the Word" | 2019 | — | — | — | Revival |
"—" denotes a recording that did not chart or was not released in that territory.

=== As a featured artist ===
List of singles, with selected chart positions and other relevant details
| Title | Year | Peak chart positions | Album |
| Title | Year | US Country | Album |
|---|---|---|---|
| "Scary Old World" (Note: Chely Wright is featured only on the album version of "Scary Old World"; the radio edit was a duet with Georgia Middleman. This song was credited to "Radney Foster with Chely Wright or Georgia Middleman".) (Radney Foster with Georgia Middleman or Chely Wright) | 2003 | 52 | Another Way to Go |

== Other charted songs ==
List of songs, with selected chart positions and other relevant details
| Title | Year | Peak chart positions | Album |
| Title | Year | US Country | Album |
|---|---|---|---|
| "Hard to Be a Husband, Hard to Be a Wife" (with Brad Paisley) | 2000 | 68 | Grand Ole Opry 75th Anniversary, Vol. 2 |

== Videography ==
=== Video albums ===
List of video albums, showing relevant details
| Title | Album details |
|---|---|
| 20th Century Masters – The Best of Chely Wright | Released: April 20, 2004; Label: MCA Nashville; Formats: DVD |

=== Music videos ===
List of music videos, showing year released and director
| Title | Year | Director(s) | Ref. |
|---|---|---|---|
| "He's a Good Ole Boy" | 1994 | Mary Newman-Said | |
| "Till I Was Loved By You" | 1994 | Bill Young | |
| "Sea of Cowboy Hats" | 1995 | Bill Young | |
| "Listening to the Radio" | 1995 | Steven Goldmann | |
| "The Love He Left Behind" | 1996 | Allen Coulter | |
| "Shut Up and Drive" | 1997 | Charley Randazzo | |
| "Just Another Heartache" | 1997 | Steven Goldmann | |
| "I Already Do" | 1998 | Gerry Wenner | |
| "Single White Female" | 1999 | Deaton-Flanigen | |
| "It Was" | 1999 | Deaton-Flanigen | |
| "She Went Out for Cigarettes" | 2000 | Deaton-Flanigen | |
| "Never Love You Enough" | 2001 | Trey Fanjoy | |
| "Jezebel" | 2001 | Trey Fanjoy | |
| "Back of the Bottom Drawer" | 2004 | Trey Fanjoy | |
| "The Bumper of My SUV" | 2004 | —N/a | |
| "The River" | 2005 | Brent Hedgecock | |
| "Sex and Gasoline" (with Rodney Crowell) | 2008 | Rodney Crowell | |
| "Sister, Oh Sister" (Rosanne Cash featuring Chely Wright) | 2012 | Devereux Milburn | |

== Other appearances ==
List of non-single guest appearances, with other performing artists, showing year released and album name
| Title | Year | Other artist(s) | Album | Ref. |
|---|---|---|---|---|
| "Let It Snow! Let It Snow! Let It Snow!" | 1999 | —N/a | A Country Christmas 1999 | |
| "Part of Your World" | 2000 | —N/a | The Little Mermaid II: Return to the Sea | |
| "The Edge of Forever" | 2000 | Richard Marx | Days in Avalon | |
| "Angel Band" | 2001 | Ralph Stanley | Clinch Mountain Sweethearts | |
| "I'm Trying" | 2001 | Diamond Rio | One More Day | |
| "Sister, Oh Sister" | 2012 | Rosanne Cash | Kin: Songs by Mary Karr & Rodney Crowell | |
