= List of awards and nominations received by Chely Wright =

Chely Wright awards and nominations
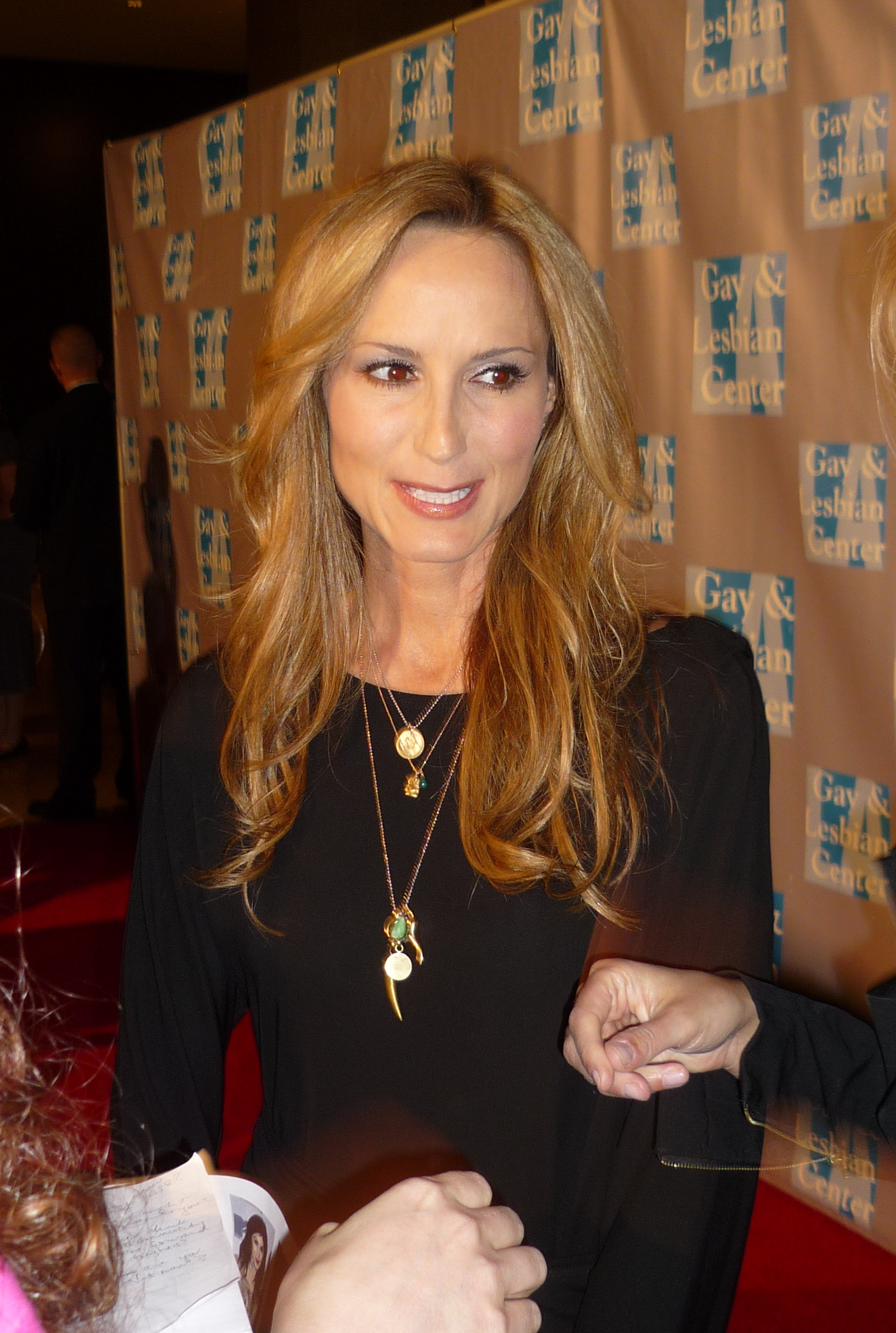
- Wright in 2008
Awards and nominations
Award	Wins	Nominations
Academy of Country Music Awards	1	2
Country Music Association Awards	0	3
Country Weekly Awards	0	4
GLAAD	0	2

American activist and country artist Chely Wright has received nine awards and over 15 award nominations. She first was recognized for her work as a country performer. Wright won her first major award in 1994 from the Academy of Country Music, who voted her their Top Female Vocalist. In later years, she would nominated for two additional awards by the association. In similar vein, she received several nominations from the Country Music Association, including two nominations for the Horizon Award. In later years, she received recognition for her role as an LGBT activist. She has been nominated twice by GLAAD and won an activist award from the Family Equality Council.

== Academy of Country Music Awards ==
Year	Nominee / work	Award	Result	Ref.
1994	Chely Wright	Top New Female Vocalist	Won	
1999	Chely Wright	Top Female Vocalist	Nominated	
1999	Chely Wright	"Single White Female"	Nominated	

== American Legion Auxiliary ==
Year	Nominee / work	Award	Result	Ref.
2003	Chely Wright	Woman of the Year	Won	

== Black Tie Dinner ==
Year	Nominee / work	Award	Result	Ref.
2010	Chely Wright	Media Award	Won	

== Country Music Association Awards ==
Year	Nominee / work	Award	Result	Ref.
1999	Chely Wright	Horizon Award	Nominated	
2000	Chely Wright	Horizon Award	Nominated	
2001	Hard to Be a Husband, Hard to Be a Wife" (with Brad Paisley)	Vocal Event of the Year	Nominated	

== CMT Music Awards ==
Year	Nominee / work	Award	Result	Ref.
1999	"Single White Female"	Female Video of the Year	Nominated	
2002	"Jezebel"	Fashion Video Plate Award	Won	

== Country Weekly Awards ==
Year	Nominee / work	Award	Result	Ref.
2001	"Hard to Be a Husband, Hard to Be a Wife" (with Brad Paisley)	Best Collaborative Event	Nominated	
2005	"The Bumper of My SUV"	Best Patriotic Song	Nominated	
2005	Chely Wright	Star with the Biggest Heart	Nominated	
2006	Chely Wright	Star with the Biggest Heart	Nominated	

== Emmy Awards ==
Year	Nominee / work	Award	Result	Ref.
2013	Wish Me Away	News & Documentary Emmy Award	Nominated	

== Family Equality Council ==
Year	Nominee / work	Award	Result	Ref.
2014	Chely Wright	Outstanding Work as an LGBT Activist	Won	

== GLAAD Media Awards ==
Year	Nominee / work	Award	Result	Ref.
2011	Lifted Off the Ground	Outstanding Music Artist	Nominated	
2013	Wish Me Away	Outstanding Documentary	Nominated	

== Lambda Literary Awards ==
Year	Nominee / work	Award	Result	Ref.
2011	Like Me: Confessions of a Heartland Country Singer	Lesbian Memoir/Biography	Nominated	

== Los Angeles Film Festival ==
Year	Nominee / work	Award	Result	Ref.
2012	Wish Me Away	Jury Prize for Best Documentary	Won	

== National Association for Music Education ==
Year	Nominee / work	Award	Result	Ref.
2001	Chely Wright	Stand Up for Music Award	Won	
2002	Chely Wright	FAME Award	Won	

== Outmusic Awards ==
Year	Nominee / work	Award	Result	Ref.
2010	Chely Wright	Vanguard Award	Won	

== Palm Springs International Film Festival ==
Year	Nominee / work	Award	Result	Ref.
2012	Wish Me Away	Audience Award, Best Documentary	Won	

== Philadelphia Q Fest ==
Year	Nominee / work	Award	Result	Ref.
2012	Wish Me Away	Jury Award, Best Documentary	Won	

== People magazine ==
Year	Nominee / work	Award	Result	Ref.
2002	Chely Wright	50 Most Beautiful People	Won	

== San Francisco LGBT Festival ==
Year	Nominee / work	Award	Result	Ref.
2012	Wish Me Away	Outstanding Documentary Feature	Won	

== Seattle LGBT Festival ==
Year	Nominee / work	Award	Result	Ref.
2012	Wish Me Away	Audience Award, Favorite Documentary Film	Won	

== TNN/Music City News Awards ==
Year	Nominee / work	Award	Result	Ref.
1996	Chely Wright	Female Star of Tomorrow	Nominated	
