= What I Learned from Loving You =

Single by Lynn Anderson

from the album Back
- B-side: "Mr. Sundown"
- Released: July 1983
- Studio: Quadrophonic Studio
- Genre: Country; country pop
- Length: 3:37
- Label: Permian
- Songwriter(s): Russell Smith; James Hooker
- Producer(s): Michael Clark

Lynn Anderson singles chronology
"You Can't Lose What You Never Had" (1983)	"What I Learned from Loving You" (1983)	"You're Welcome to Tonight" (1983)

"What I Learned from Loving You" is a song written by Russell Smith and James Hooker. It was recorded by American country music artist Lynn Anderson and released as a single in July 1983 via Permian Records.

== Background and release ==
"What I Learned from Loving You" was recorded at the Quadrophonic Studio, located in Nashville, Tennessee. The sessions was produced by Michael Clark. It was among Anderson's first sessions recording with Clark.

"What I Learned from Loving You" reached number 18 on the Billboard Hot Country Singles chart in 1983. It became Anderson's comeback single due to it being her first major hit since 1979. Her next single release would become even more successful after it reached the country top ten. The song was issued on Anderson's 1983 studio album, Back. The song would later be recorded by Chely Wright for her 1996 studio release, Right in the Middle of It. The song was also recorded onto Kenny Rogers 1983 studio album We’ve got tonight.

== Track listings ==
7" vinyl single

- "What I Learned from Loving You" – 3:37
- "Mr. Sundown" – 2:45

== Chart performance ==
Chart (1983)	Peak position
US Hot Country Songs (Billboard)	18
