= Like Me =

Like Me may refer to:

- "Like Me" (Girlicious song), 2008
- Like Me (film), a 2017 American horror film
- Like Me (musical), a musical
- "Like Me" (Lil Durk song), 2015
- Like Me: Confessions of a Heartland Country Singer, a 2010 memoir by Chely Wright
- "Like Me", a song by Denzel Curry from Nostalgic 64
- "Like Me", a song by Joey Badass from B4.Da.$$
