= Shut Up and Drive (disambiguation) =

"Shut Up and Drive" is a 2007 song by Rihanna.

"Shut Up and Drive" may also refer to:

- "Shut Up and Drive" (Chely Wright song), 1997
- "Shut Up and Drive", a song by Widespread Panic song from Dirty Side Down
