= Santa Will Find You! =

EP by Chely Wright
- Released: October 26, 2018
- Recorded: April–July 2018
- Studio: The 515; Jigsaw; Sputnik
- Genre: Christmas
- Length: 22:47
- Label: Chely Wright; Painted Red; The Orchard
- Producer: Jeremy Lister; Dustin Ransom

Chely Wright chronology
I Am the Rain (2016)	Santa Will Find You! (2018)	Revival (2019)

Santa Will Find You! is an extended play released by American country music artist Chely Wright. It was released on October 26, 2018 by Painted Red Music Group, and The Orchard. Santa Will Find You was Wright's first album collection of holiday songs and her third extended play release in her career. It contained a total of six tracks.

== Background and content ==
Since the release of 2016's I Am the Rain, Chely Wright had not recorded new music. For several years, she had been contemplating the recording of a holiday record. She was partly inspired by the album's title track, which was originally included on Mindy Smith's 2007 album, My Holiday. The song had originally been composed in tribute to military men and women overseas. However, Wright felt the song took new meaning in her recent role of becoming a mother. The extended play contained a total of six new holiday tracks. In a 2018 interview with Billboard, Wright said that she felt ready to make a holiday album: "It's been tugging at me to make a holiday record for a long time, especially since I had a couple songs that have a track record already. I felt like I had a head start on it."

Along with its title track, additional songs on the record were first cut by other performers. The track, "It Really Is (A Wonderful Life)" was first recorded by the Indigo Girls. Wright later performed the tune at the Christmas tree lighting ceremony in Washington, D.C. before officially recording it for the album. "Christmas Isn't Christmas Time" was composed by Wright and her friend, Richard Marx. A second version of the track was included on the album that was made to resemble that of producer, Phil Spector. "When I hear a Spector record, even when it’s not a Christmas song, it just takes me to Christmas," Wright commented to Rolling Stone. The project was recorded at three separate studios in Nashville, Tennessee: The 515 Studio, Sputnik Sound and the Jigsaw Studio. It was co-produced by Jeremy Lister and Dustin Ransom.

== Release and reception ==
Professional ratings
Review scores
Source	Rating
Stomp and Stammer	Favorable

Santa Will Find You! was first released on October 26, 2018 in conjunction with the Painted Red Music Group (Wright's own label), The Orchard and her own self-released company, Chely Wright. The album was offered as a compact disc, vinyl and a digital download. Following its release, Wright commented to Taste of Country that she "hope[s] this music becomes part of a new emotional landscape for listeners." Santa Will Find You! was reviewed positively by Bobby Moore of the music publication, Stomp and Stammer. Moore called its five songs to be "dripping with the down-home vibes craved by her longtime fans and new listeners ." In addition, Moore concluded: "The vibe of this release owes a lot to music still relatively new in ’73, copying the sounds of the season from the singer’s own childhood. That’s not to timestamp songs that sound relevant in 2018 and should beckon new rounds of holiday cheer for years to come." In addition, Robert Crawford of Rolling Stone named its title track one of the magazine's "10 Best Country Songs of the Week" in December 2018.

== Track listing ==
Santa Will Find You! (CD and digital versions)
No.	Title	Writer(s)	Length
1.	"It Really Is (A Wonderful Life)"	Chely Wright	3:41
2.	"Can't Believe It's Christmas"	Jeremy Lister; Wright	3:57
3.	"Happy New Year, Old Friend"	Richard Marx; Wright	4:03
4.	"Christmas Isn't Christmas Time" (featuring Richard Marx)	Marx; Wright	3:37
5.	"Santa Will Find You"	Mindy Smith; Wright	3:52

Bonus track
No.	Title	Writer(s)	Length
6.	"Christmas Isn't Christmas Time" (Spector version)	Marx; Wright	3:37
Total length:			22:47

== Personnel ==
All credits are adapted from the liner notes of Santa Willd Find You! and Allmusic.

Musical personnel

- Vinnie Ciesielski – flugelhorn, trumpet
- Court Clement – 12-string electric guitar, acoustic guitar, electric guitar
- Eleonore Denig – violin
- Tara Johnson – French horn
- Emily Kohavi – viola, violin
- Besty Lamb – viola
- Jeremy Lister – Tambourine, background vocals
- Richard Marx – featured artist
- Emily Nelson – cello
- Dustin Ransom – Background vocals, bass, drums, fender rhodes, acoustic guitar, electric guitar, Hammond B3, hand-clapping, harpsichord, organ, piano, sleigh bells, tambourine, toy piano, tubular bells, Wurlitzer piano
- Tyler Summers – Baritone saxophone, clarinet
- Oscar Utterström – Trombone
- Kevin Whitsett – Upright bass
- Chely Wright – lead vocals, background vocals

Technical personnel

- Adam Bokesch – engineer
- Joe Causey – mastering
- Mitch Dane – additional production, engineer
- Charlene Daniels – photography
- Marla Frazee – cover art
- Jeremy Lister – orchestral arrangements, producer
- Jonathan Lister – mixing assistant
- Richie Lister – orchestral arrangements
- Dustin Ransom – engineer, mixing, orchestral arrangements, producer
- Koehn Terry – assistant engineer

== Charts ==
Chart (2018)	Peak position
US Top Holiday Albums (Billboard)	26
US Independent Albums (Billboard)	33

== Release history ==
Region	Date	Format	Label	Ref.
United States	October 26, 2018	Compact disc	Chely Wright; Painted Red Music Group; The Orchard	
United States	October 26, 2018	Vinyl	Chely Wright; Painted Red Music Group; The Orchard	
United States	October 26, 2018	Digital download; streaming	Chely Wright; Painted Red Music Group; The Orchard	
