= Never Love You Enough (song) =

Single by Chely Wright

from the album Never Love You Enough
- B-side: "Deep Down Low"
- Released: May 21, 2001
- Genre: Country
- Length: 3:53
- Label: MCA Nashville
- Songwriter(s): Brett James; Angelo Petraglia
- Producer(s): Dann Huff

Chely Wright singles chronology
"She Went Out for Cigarettes" (2000)	"Never Love You Enough" (2001)	"Jezebel" (2001)

"Never Love You Enough" is a song recorded by American country music artist Chely Wright. The song was released by MCA Nashville on May 21, 2001, as the lead single from Wright's fifth studio album Never Love You Enough. The song was written by Brett James and Angelo Petraglia, and produced by Dann Huff.

The song peaked at number 26 on the US Hot Country Songs chart.

== Music video ==
The music video for "Never Love You Enough" was added to CMT on June 17, 2001.

== Commercial performance ==
"Never Love You Enough" debuted on the US Billboard Hot Country Songs chart the week of June 2, 2001, at number 53. It reached its peak position of number 26 for the week of October 13, 2001, spending a total of 20 weeks on the chart.

== Charts ==
Chart (2001)	Peak position
US Hot Country Songs (Billboard)	26

=== Year-end charts ===
Chart (2001)	Peak position
US Hot Country Singles & Tracks (Billboard)	86

== Release history ==
Release dates and format(s) for "Never Love You Enough"
Region	Date	Format(s)	Label(s)	Ref.
United States	May 21, 2001	country radio	MCA Nashville	
