= Back of the Bottom Drawer =

Single by Chely Wright

from the album Everything
- Released: March 15, 2004
- Studio: The Sound Kitchen
- Genre: Country; contemporary country
- Length: 3:44
- Label: Vivaton
- Songwriters: Liz Rose; Chely Wright
- Producers: Jeff Huskins; Chely Wright

Chely Wright singles chronology
"Jezebel" (2001)	"Back of the Bottom Drawer" (2004)	"The Bumper of My SUV" (2004)

"Back of the Bottom Drawer" is a song co-written and recorded by American country artist Chely Wright. Wright wrote the song with then-unknown songwriter Liz Rose, who would later become famous for co-writing much of Taylor Swift's early material. The song was produced by Wright and Jeff Huskins of Little Texas. It was released on March 15, 2004 through Dualtone Records and Vivaton, her first independent release after being dropped by MCA Nashville in 2002.

The song received positive reviews from music critics, with praise going to the lyrics and Wright's delivery. The song was her first release to country radio since "Jezebel" in December 2001. The song rose to a peak of number forty on the Billboard Hot Country Songs, becoming her eighth top-forty hit. The song was included on her Everything EP in 2004 before being included on her sixth studio album The Metropolitan Hotel (2005). A music video was also released, filmed by Trey Fanjoy who had also directed the music video for "Jezebel".

== Background and recording ==
Chely Wright had several years of success with the major Nashville record label, MCA Records. Wright had commercial hits with songs such as "Shut Up and Drive" (1997) and "Single White Female" (1999). She was later dropped from MCA and became the first artist to sign with the independent Nashville label, Vivaton Records. According to an interview with Country Music Television, Wright believed the song to be "special" after composing it with Liz Rose. The lyrics of the song were written from Wright's own experiences of saving mementos in small spaces—"I'm 33 years old, I’ve got a couple of champagne corks, and those are my stories, and I don't have to tell about it." "Back of the Bottom Drawer" was recorded at The Sound Kitchen, a studio located in Nashville, Tennessee. The project was co-produced by Wright herself, along with Jeff Huskins.

== Critical reception ==
"Back of the Bottom Drawer" received positive reviews from critics. Deborah Evans Price of Billboard gave the song a favorable response, in her review of recent singles to Reach radio in 2004. Price described the song as "passionate, poignant, and flawlessly-delivered." Evans commented that the song described not only physical things, but also aims for what the character in the song wanted to become,"Here she delivers a beautifully written song about mementos hidden in a drawer that represent not only memories from the past but stepping stones to the woman she is still trying to become." Bobby More of Wide Open Country named the song one of Wright's "10 Best of Her Career" and called it a "sentimental ballad about a woman's box of knick-knacks that reminds her of the mistakes that prepared her to become the right woman for her current partner."

== Release and chart performance ==
"Back of the Bottom Drawer" was released to country radio on March 15, 2004. The song had not been announced as a lead single for a project at the time of its release, but was later included on the Everything EP and The Metropolitan Hotel (2005) album. In its original release, the single was released to radio programmers on a compact disc and had the song repeat three times.

The song spent 15 weeks on the Billboard Hot Country Songs chart and peaked at number 40 in May 2004. It was Wright's first charting single in three years and among her final songs to reach the country top 40 on Billboard. A full studio album was originally intended for release in August 2004. However, it had been announced in June of that same year that Wright had left the Vivaton label, citing "creative differences" with producer Jeff Huskins. Instead the song was released on an extended play in October 2004 titled, Everything. In February 2005, it was released on Wright's studio album titled The Metropolitan Hotel. A music video was later released for the song, which was directed by Trey Fanjoy.

== Track listing ==
CD single

(Single repeats three times, according to CD release information)

- "Back of the Bottom Drawer" – 3:44
- "Back of the Bottom Drawer" – 3:44
- "Back of the Bottom Drawer" – 3:44

== Charts ==
=== Weekly charts ===
Chart (2004)	Peak position
US Hot Country Songs (Billboard)	40

== Release history ==
Release dates and formats for "Back of the Bottom Drawer"
Region	Date	Format(s)	Label(s)	Ref.
United States	March 15, 2004	Country radio	Vivaton	
