= Dustin Ransom =

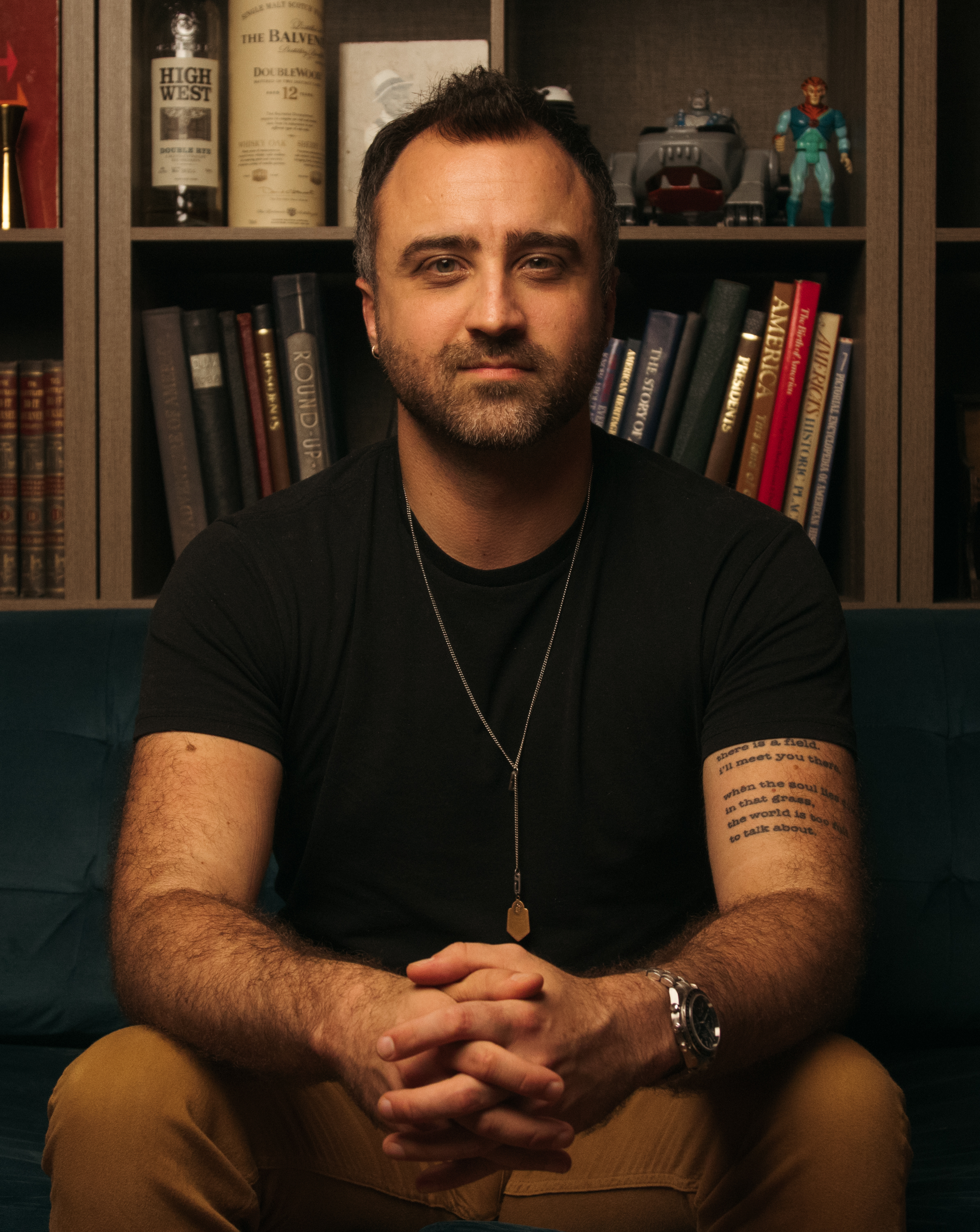
- Dustin Ransom, 2023

Background information
- Born: Dustin Ray Ransom; December 5, 1986 (age 39); Evansville, Indiana, United States
- Genres: Rock, soul, funk, indie-rock, ambient, pop, Christian, jazz, country
- Occupations: Musician, producer, composer, arranger, film composer, music transcriber
- Years active: 1990–present
- Website: dustinransom.com

Dustin Ransom (born December 5, 1986) is an American multi-instrumentalist, producer, vocalist, arranger, music transcriber, and film composer based in Nashville, Tennessee. As a session musician, live musician, and producer, he has worked with and performed with artists including Chely Wright, Dave Barnes, Matt Wertz, Jon McLaughlin, Brett Eldredge, Ryan Bingham, Richard Marx, Jars of Clay, Matt Maher, Andrew Belle, Ben Rector, and Cody Belew, among others. As an arranger and transcriber, he has worked with music companies including Vic Firth, and Mel Bay.

== Biography ==
Born in Evansville, Indiana, Ransom was raised in Boonville, Indiana. At age three, he began taking piano lessons, which he continued until his junior year of college. He also began playing drums from an early age, received his first drum set at age eight, then began taking lessons at age eleven until he graduated from college. At the age of eleven, he began teaching himself guitar and bass.

In 2005, he moved to Nashville, Tennessee to pursue a Bachelor of Music in Commercial Percussion, or drum set, at Belmont University. He studied drum set with Chester Thompson, Zoro, and Todd London, classical percussion with Dr. Chris Norton and Todd Kemp, and jazz piano with Bruce Dudley and Steve Willets. He graduated in 2009.
