= I Already Do =

Single by Chely Wright

from the album Let Me In
- B-side: "Is It Love Yet?"
- Released: March 16, 1998
- Genre: Country
- Length: 3:47
- Label: MCA Nashville
- Songwriters: Chely Wright, Gary Burr
- Producer: Tony Brown

Chely Wright singles chronology
"Just Another Heartache" (1997)	"I Already Do" (1998)	"Single White Female" (1999)

"I Already Do" is a song co-written and recorded by American country music artist Chely Wright. It was released in March 1998 as the third single from the album Let Me In. The song reached #36 on the Billboard Hot Country Singles & Tracks chart. The song was written by Wright and Gary Burr.

== Charts ==
Chart (1998)	Peak position
Canada Country Singles (RPM)	59
US Hot Country Songs (Billboard)	36

== Release history ==
Release dates and format(s) for "I Already Do"
Region	Date	Format(s)	Label(s)	Ref.
United States	March 16, 1998	Country radio	MCA Nashville	
