= Just Another Heartache =

Single by Chely Wright

from the album Let Me In
- B-side: "Feelin Single and Seein' Double"
- Released: November 17, 1997
- Genre: Country
- Length: 2:41
- Label: MCA Nashville
- Songwriters: Ed Hill, Mark D. Sanders
- Producer: Tony Brown

Chely Wright singles chronology
"Shut Up and Drive" (1997)	"Just Another Heartache" (1997)	"I Already Do" (1998)

"Just Another Heartache" is a song recorded by American country music artist Chely Wright. It was released in November 1997 as the second single from the album Let Me In. The song reached #39 on the Billboard Hot Country Singles & Tracks chart. The song was written by Ed Hill and Mark D. Sanders.

== Charts ==
Chart (1997–1998)	Peak position
Canada Country Tracks (RPM)	81
US Hot Country Songs (Billboard)	39

== Release history ==
Release dates and format(s) for "Just Another Heartache"
Region	Date	Format(s)	Label(s)	Ref.
United States	November 17, 1997	Country radio	MCA Nashville	
