= The Metropolitan Hotel =

2005 album by Chely Wright

Studio album by Chely Wright
- Released: February 22, 2005
- Genre: Country
- Label: Painted Red; Dualtone
- Producer: Chely Wright; Jeff Huskins; Stephony Smith

Chely Wright chronology
Everything (2004)	The Metropolitan Hotel (2005)	Lifted Off the Ground (2010)

Singles from The Metropolitan Hotel
- 1. "Back of the Bottom Drawer" Released: March 15, 2004; 2. "The Bumper of My SUV" Released: November 8, 2004; 3. "The River" Released: May 24, 2005; 4. "C'est La Vie (You Can Never Tell)" Released: October 31, 2005

Professional ratings
Review scores
Source	Rating
Allmusic	link
Country Standard Time	link

The Metropolitan Hotel is the sixth studio album by American country music artist Chely Wright. It was released on February 22, 2005, via Dualtone Records and her own label Painted Red. Following this album, Wright would take an extensive hiatus from the music industry before returning and coming out.

The album was highly acclaimed. Four singles in total were released. "Back of the Bottom Drawer" peaked at number 40. The military inspired song "The Bumper of My SUV" peaked at number 35 on the US Hot Country Songs chart. The third and fourth singles did not chart: "The River" and a cover of Chuck Berry's "You Never Can Tell" (re-titled as "C'est La Vie (You Never Can Tell).

== Singles ==
"Back of the Bottom Drawer" was released as the lead single from the album on March 15, 2004, when Wright was signed under the Vivaton! label. The song was positively reviewed by music critics, with praise going towards Wright's vocals and the lyrics. It peaked at number 40 on the US Billboard Hot Country Songs chart. The second single "The Bumper of My SUV" was released on November 8, 2004. It received attention due to Wright performing the song in Iraq. When originally released, it peaked at number 54. It would be discovered that members of Wright's fan club were contacting country radio stations, posing as family or friends of military members when requesting the single. This would go on to lead both the single to be re-released and Wright firing the club's leader. This re-issue did help the single, reaching a peak of number 35. The third single "The River" was first released on May 24, 2005, to CMT and June 18, 2005, to GAC. Although a release to radio was planned following the single's video release, it was never commissioned. A cover of Chuck Berry's "C'est La Vie (You Never Can Tell)" would be released on October 31, 2005, as the fourth and final single. It failed to enter any charts.

== Track listing ==
No.	Title	Writer(s)	Producer(s)	Length
1.	"It's the Song"	Bonnie Baker; Katrina Elam	Chely Wright	3:57
2.	"Back of the Bottom Drawer"	Liz Rose; Chely Wright	Wright; Jeff Huskins	3:43
3.	"I Got Him Ready for You"	Wright	Wright; Huskins	3:19
4.	"The River"	Wright	Wright; Huskins	6:29
5.	"Just the Way We Do It"	Brett Beavers; Wright	Wright	3:39
6.	"The Bumper of My SUV"	Wright	Wright	4:41
7.	"Your Shirt"	Lisa Drew; Pound Lamb	Wright; Huskins	3:54
8.	"Between a Mother and a Child"	Wright	Wright	4:09
9.	"Southside of Lonesome"	Wright	Wright; Huskins	4:00
10.	"Wheels"	Stephony Smith; Wright	Stephony Smith; Wright	3:43
11.	"C'est La Vie (You Never Can Tell)"	Chuck Berry	Wright	3:13
12.	"What If I Can't Say No Again"	Ed Hill; David Frasier; Josh Kear	Wright; Huskins	4:11

== Personnel ==
As listed in liner notes:

- Steve Brewster – drums
- Tom Bukovac – electric guitar
- Jimmy Carter – bass guitar
- Eric Darken – percussion
- Chip Davis – background vocals
- Stuart Duncan – mandolin
- Shannon Forrest – drums
- Vince Gill – background vocals
- Tony Harrell – keyboards
- Aubrey Haynie – fiddle
- Mark Hill – bass guitar
- Sean Hurley – bass guitar
- Travis Javis – piano
- Jeff King – electric guitar
- Chris McHugh – drums
- Greg Morrow – drums
- Gordon Mote – piano, keyboards
- James T. Olsen – electric guitar
- Russ Pahl – steel guitar
- Billy Panda – acoustic guitar
- Scotty Sanders – steel guitar
- Bryan Sutton – acoustic guitar
- Michael Hart Thompson – electric guitar
- Emily West – background vocals
- John Willis – acoustic guitar
- Chely Wright – lead vocals
- Jonathan Yudkin – mandolin

Strings on "Back of the Bottom Drawer" and "The River" performed by the Nashville String Machine, conducted and arranged by Steve W. Maldin. Strings on "Between a Mother and a Child" performed and arranged by Jonathan Yudkin.

== Charts ==
Chart (2005)	Peak position
US Billboard 200	96
US Independent Albums (Billboard)	7
US Top Country Albums (Billboard)	18
UK Country Albums (OCC)	3
