= Everything (EP) =

2004 EP by Chely Wright

EP by Chely Wright
- Released: October 26, 2004 Original; November 16, 2004 Re-Release
- Genre: Country
- Length: 22:13
- Label: Painted Red Music Group
- Producer: Chely Wright, Jeff Huskins

Chely Wright chronology
Never Love You Enough (2001)	Everything (2004)	The Metropolitan Hotel (2005)

Singles from Everything
- 1. "Back of the Bottom Drawer" Released: March 15, 2004

Professional ratings
Review scores
Source	Rating
Allmusic	4/5 stars

Everything is an EP released by American country music artist Chely Wright. This is Wright's first EP and first release on her own record company, Painted Red. The album features the video hit "Back of the Bottom Drawer" along with four demos. The EP also contains a DVD that includes footage personal footage and photos of Wright.

The album was released exclusively on Wright's official website; however, it was later available in major retail outlets.

== Track listing ==
All tracks are written by Chely Wright, with additional co-writers as noted.

No.	Title	Writer(s)	Length
1.	"Back of the Bottom Drawer"	Liz Rose	3:45
2.	"Everything"	Gary Burr	3:41
3.	"Love Lets Go" (Home Studio Demo)		3:19
4.	"Sex, Drugs and Rock & Roll" (Home Studio Demo)	Burr	3:40
5.	"If I Were Jackie" (Home Studio Demo)	Michael Mobley	3:23
6.	"Scars" (Home Studio Demo)		4:25
Total length:			22:13

== Personnel ==
- Kelly Back - electric guitar
- Jimmy Carter - bass guitar
- Eric Darken - percussion
- Shannon Forrest - drums
- Larry Franklin - fiddle
- Aubrey Haynie - fiddle
- Jeff Huskins - gut string guitar
- Jeff King - electric guitar
- Chris McHugh - drums
- Gordon Mote - piano
- The Nashville String Machine - strings
- Mike Rojas - piano
- Scotty Sanders - pedal steel guitar
- Bryan Sutton - acoustic guitar
- John Willis - acoustic guitar
- Chely Wright - piano, lead vocals, background vocals
