= I Am the Rain =

2016 album by Chely Wright

Studio album by Chely Wright
- Released: September 9, 2016
- Recorded: Los Angeles, California, Culver City, California, Nashville, Tennessee
- Genres: Country folk, Americana
- Length: 56:49
- Label: MRI/Sony/PaintedRed
- Producer: Joe Henry

Chely Wright chronology
Lifted Off the Ground (2010)	I Am the Rain (2016)	Santa Will Find You! (2018)

I Am the Rain is the eighth studio album by singer-songwriter Chely Wright. The album was released via MRI/Sony/Painted Red Records on September 9, 2016, after being funded by fans through a Kickstarter campaign launched in September 2014.

I Am the Rain is Wright's second highest debuting album of her career on the Billboard Country chart at No. 13 and her highest charting album of her career on the Top Album Sales chart at No. 54.

== Background ==
After a highly successful Kickstarter campaign, funded by over 2,000 backers, Wright's album campaign became the most successful Kickstarter campaign of any country artist. The album's recording process began in September 2015. The album, unlike any previous of Wright's was recorded almost entirely in California and was her first new material since Lifted off the Ground in May 2010. Beginning on September 8, 2015 and concluding on September 12, 2015, the album was recorded mainly at Sunset Sound in Los Angeles, California with additional recording done in Culver City and Nashville, Tennessee.

In an update to Kickstarter supporters on April 19, 2016, Wright revealed that Grammy award-winning producer, Joe Henry was the producer for the record, a suggestion given to her by close friend Rodney Crowell. She also confirmed the album's release and distribution through SonyRed.

In addition to Henry at the helm of production, singer songwriters, Rodney Crowell, Emmylou Harris, and The Milk Carton Kids served as guest vocalists on the album. Crowell provided background vocals on "Holy War," while Harris appears on, "Pain." The Milk Carton Kids make two appearances on the album during, "You Are the River," and the Bob Dylan cover, "Tomorrow Is A Long Time."

"What About Your Heart" was made available as an instant download track for all pre-orders while fans who pre-ordered the album through Wright's website received "Mexico" as an instant download track.

== Commercial reception ==
The album debuted at No. 13 on Billboard's Top Country Albums chart, selling 4,100 copies in the first week. It also reached No. 181 on Billboard 200. It also marks her first appearance on the Billboard Folk/Americana Chart debuting in the top 10 at No. 9.

== Track listing ==
1. "Inside" (Chely Wright) - 4:18
2. "Where Will You Be" (Wright) - 4:14
3. "At The Heart Of Me" (Rodney Crowell, Joe Henry, Wright) - 4:45
4. "You Are The River" (Edie Carey, Wright) - 5:01
5. "Holy War" (Henry, Wright) - 4:52
6. "What About Your Heart" (Wright) - 3:59
7. "Pain" (Wright) - 3:58
8. "Tomorrow Is a Long Time" (Bob Dylan) - 3:35
9. "Blood And Bones And Skin" (Wright) - 3:59
10. "Mexico" (Wright) - 4:41
11. "Next To Me" (Wright) - 3:52
12. "Halona" (Wright) - 4:12
13. "See Me Home" (Henry, Wright) - 5:18

== Personnel ==
Per album liner notes:

- Joe Henry - Producer
- Ryan Freeland - Recording and Mixing
- Drew Bollman - Recording and Mixing
- Reed Black - Engineer
- Clinton Welander - Assistant Engineer
- Mike Stankiewicz - Assistant Engineer
- Kim Rosen - Mastering
- Jay Bellerose - Drums, Percussion
- Mark Goldenberg - Acoustic Guitar, Electric Guitar
- Levon Henry - Clarinet, Bass Clarinet, Tenor Saxophone
- Eric Haywood - Pedal Steel
- Adam Levy - Acoustic Guitar, Electric Guitar
- David Piltch - Upright Bass, Electric Bass
- Patrick Warren - Piano, Pump and Hammond organ, additional keys
- Jedd Hughes - Electric Guitar
- Jeremy Lister - background vocals
- Rodney Crowell - background vocals
- Emmylou Harris - background vocals
- Joey Ryan - background vocals
- Kenneth Pattengale - background vocals
- Katherine H. Almedia - background vocals
- Karen M. Bosia - background vocals
- Althea Champagnie - background vocals
- Kate Cotter-Reilly - background vocals
- Jeff Parshley - background vocals
- Marla Pasquale - background vocals
- Tamara Lynn Peterson - background vocals
- Julie Shiflett - background vocals

== Charts ==
Chart (2016)	Peak position
US Billboard 200	181
US Top Country Albums (Billboard)	13
US Independent Albums (Billboard)	17
US Americana/Folk Albums	9
US Top Album Sales	54

== Release history ==
Region	Date	Label	Format
Worldwide	September 9, 2016	MRI/Sony/Painted Red	CD, Digital Download
Worldwide	November 4, 2016	MRI/Sony/Painted Red	Vinyl
