= Never Love You Enough =

2001 album by Chely Wright

Studio album by Chely Wright
- Released: September 25, 2001
- Genre: Country
- Length: 45:54
- Label: MCA Nashville
- Producers: Tony Brown; Buddy Cannon; Dann Huff; Brad Paisley; Paul Worley; Chely Wright

Chely Wright chronology
Single White Female (1999)	Never Love You Enough (2001)	Everything (2004)

Singles from Never Love You Enough
- 1. "Never Love You Enough" Released: May 21, 2001; 2. "Jezebel" Released: December 3, 2001

Never Love You Enough is the fifth studio album by American country music artist Chely Wright. It was released on September 25, 2001, via MCA Nashville. It was her last album released for the label. The album was produced by Wright, Tony Brown, Buddy Cannon, Dann Huff, Brad Paisley, and Paul Worley.

Never Love You Enough received mixed reviews from critics who compared it negatively to her previous work. The album peaked at number 4 on the Top Country Albums chart, and number 62 on the Billboard 200.

The album had two singles. "Never Love You Enough" was released in May 2001 and peaked at number 28. The second and final single, "Jezebel" peaked at number 23.

== Critical reception ==
Professional ratings
Review scores
Source	Rating
Allmusic	2/5 stars
Country Standard Time	mixed

Michael Galluci of Allmusic rated the album 2 stars out of 5, saying that "This more conservative follow-up finds her back on the farm, still tracking the ins and outs of love, but accompanied by a shrugging indifference." Eli Messinger of Country Standard Time gave the album a mixed review, saying that "Folksiness has given way to the chart-friendly crossover material and arena-styled power-ballads that continue to reign on her latest." and "The centrist, traditional messages may connect with listeners, but they won't push anyone's buttons or boundaries… This is a pleasant pop album, but hardly the sort of truly memorable work that Wright is so obviously capable of."

== Track listing ==
No.	Title	Writer(s)	Producer	Length
1.	"Never Love You Enough"	Brett James, Angelo Petraglia	Dann Huff	3:53
2.	"Jezebel"	Marcus Hummon, Jay DeMarcus	Paul Worley, Wright	3:10
3.	"One Night in Las Vegas"	Chely Wright, Brad Paisley	Wright, Paisley	4:13
4.	"While I Was Waiting"	Roxie Dean, Gordon Bradberry	Tony Brown, Buddy Cannon	3:27
5.	"What If We Fly"	Mark Selby, Tia Sillers	Worley	3:54
6.	"Wouldn't It Be Cool"	Wright, Dean	Brown, Cannon	3:04
7.	"Her"	Leslie Satcher	Brown, Cannon	3:43
8.	"Love Didn't Listen"	Wendell Mobley, Stephany Delray	Brown, Cannon	3:42
9.	"For the Long Run"	Pat Alger, Bat McGrath	Brown, Cannon	4:14
10.	"Horoscope"	Wright, Paisley	Wright, Paisley	4:10
11.	"Not as In Love"	Wright, Paisley, Tim Nichols	Brown, Cannon	3:35
12.	"Deep Down Low"	Wright	Brown, Cannon	4:41

== Personnel ==
Compiled from liner notes.

=== Musicians ===
Never Love You Enough

- Mike Brignardello – bass guitar
- Lisa Cochran – background vocals
- Dann Huff – electric guitar
- Mike Johnson – steel guitar
- B. James Lowry – acoustic guitar
- Chris McHugh – drums
- Jerry McPherson – electric guitar
- Steve Nathan – keyboards
- Chris Rodriguez – background vocals
- Chely Wright – lead vocals

Jezebel

- Barry Bales – background vocals
- J. T. Corenflos – electric guitar
- Stuart Duncan – fiddle
- Wes Hightower – background vocals
- John Hobbs – piano, Hammond B-3 organ
- David Huff – programming
- Marcus Hummon – acoustic guitar, background vocals
- Troy Johnson – background vocals
- Paul Leim – drums
- Michael Rhodes – bass guitar
- Darrell Scott – acoustic guitar, banjo, mandolin, background vocals
- Dan Tyminski – background vocals
- Chely Wright – lead vocals, background vocals

One Night in Las Vegas

- Jim "Moose" Brown – piano, keyboards, strings
- Kevin "Swine" Grantt – bass guitar
- Wes Hightower – background vocals
- Mike Johnson – steel guitar
- Troy Johnson – background vocals
- Mitch McMichen – percussion
- Brad Paisley – acoustic guitar, electric guitar, background vocals
- Ben Sesar – drums
- Justin Williamson – fiddle, mandolin
- Chely Wright – lead vocals

While I Was Waiting

- Chad Cromwell – drums
- Eric Darken – percussion
- Dan Dugmore – steel guitar
- Stuart Duncan – mandolin
- Steve Gibson – electric guitar
- Wes Hightower – background vocals
- John Hobbs – keyboards
- Liana Manis – background vocals
- Matt Rollings – keyboards
- John Willis – acoustic guitar
- Glenn Worf – bass guitar
- Chely Wright – lead vocals

What If We Fly

- J.T. Corenflos – electric guitar
- Stuart Duncan – fiddle
- Paul Franklin – steel guitar
- Wes Hightower – background vocals
- John Hobbs – piano
- David Huff – programming
- Marcus Hummon – acoustic guitar
- Troy Johnson – background vocals
- Paul Leim – drums
- Michael Rhodes – bass guitar
- Darrell Scott – acoustic guitar
- Paul Worley – electric guitar
- Chely Wright – lead vocals

Wouldn't It Be Cool

- Pat Buchanan – electric guitar
- Melonie Cannon – background vocals
- Chad Cromwell – drums
- Eric Darken – percussion
- Dan Dugmore – 12-string guitar electric guitar
- Stuart Duncan – fiddle
- Steve Gibson – electric guitar
- John Hobbs – piano
- Garnet Imes – background vocals
- Matt Rollings – keyboards
- John Willis – acoustic guitar
- Glenn Worf – bass guitar
- Chely Wright – lead vocals
- Trisha Yearwood – background vocals

Her

- Chad Cromwell – drums
- Eric Darken – percussion
- Dan Dugmore – steel guitar
- Stuart Duncan – fiddle
- Steve Gibson – electric guitar
- Wes Hightower – background vocals
- John Hobbs – keyboards
- Nashville String Machine – strings
- Matt Rollings – keyboards
- John Willis – acoustic guitar
- Glenn Worf – bass guitar
- Chely Wright – lead vocals

Love Didn't Listen

- Chad Cromwell – drums
- Eric Darken – percussion
- Dan Dugmore – steel guitar
- Larry Franklin – fiddle
- Steve Gibson – acoustic guitar
- Wes Hightower – background vocals
- John Hobbs – piano
- John Jorgenson – electric guitar
- Wendell Mobley – background vocals
- Steve Nathan – Hammond B-3 organ
- Glenn Worf – bass guitar
- Chely Wright – lead vocals

For the Long Run

- Chad Cromwell – drums
- Dan Dugmore – steel guitar
- Larry Franklin – fiddle
- Steve Gibson – electric guitar
- Wes Hightower – background vocals
- John Barlow Jarvis – keyboards
- John Jorgenson – electric guitar
- Liana Manis – background vocals
- Nashville String Machine – strings
- Steve Nathan – keyboards
- Phil Vassar – background vocals
- John Willis – acoustic guitar
- Glenn Worf – bass guitar
- Chely Wright – lead vocals

Horoscope

- Jim "Moose" Brown – piano, Hammond B-3 organ
- Shannon Brown – background vocals
- Kevin "Swine" Grantt – bass guitar
- Wes Hightower – background vocals
- Mike Johnson – steel guitar
- Troy Johnson – background vocals
- Kendal Marcy – background vocals
- Kris Marcy – background vocals
- Mitch McMichen – percussion
- Brad Paisley – acoustic guitar, electric guitar, resophonic guitar
- Ben Sesar – drums
- Justin Williamson – fiddle, mandolin
- Chely Wright – lead vocals, background vocals

Not as In Love

- Chad Cromwell – drums
- Dan Dugmore – steel guitar
- Larry Franklin – fiddle
- Steve Gibson – electric guitar
- Wes Hightower – background vocals
- John Barlow Jarvis – piano
- John Jorgenson – acoustic guitar, mandocello
- Nashville String Machine – strings
- Steve Nathan – keyboards
- Brad Paisley – background vocals
- Glenn Worf – bass guitar
- Chely Wright – lead vocals

Deep Down Low

- Chad Cromwell – drums
- Eric Darken – percussion
- Chip Davis – background vocals
- Dan Dugmore – steel guitar
- Larry Franklin – fiddle
- Steve Gibson – acoustic guitar
- John Hobbs – piano
- John Jorgenson – electric guitar
- Steve Nathan – Hammond B-3 organ
- Glenn Worf – bass guitar
- Chely Wright – lead vocals

== Charts ==
=== Weekly charts ===
Chart (2001)	Peak position
US Billboard 200	62
US Top Country Albums (Billboard)	4
UK Country Albums (OCC)	7

=== Year-end charts ===
Chart (2002)	Position
US Top Country Albums (Billboard)	74
