= Woman in the Moon (album) =

1994 album by Chely Wright

Studio album by Chely Wright
- Released: August 9, 1994
- Studio: Music Mill; OmniSound; Woodland
- Genre: Country
- Length: 32:10
- Label: Polydor Nashville
- Producer: Barry Beckett; Harold Shedd

Chely Wright chronology
Woman in the Moon (1994)	Right in the Middle of It (1996)

Singles from Woman in the Moon
- 1. "He's a Good Ole Boy" Released: July 1994; 2. "Till I Was Loved by You" Released: October 3, 1994; 3. "Sea of Cowboy Hats" Released: January 23, 1995

Woman in the Moon is the debut studio album by American country music artist Chely Wright. The album was released on August 9, 1994, via Polydor Nashville and was produced by both Barry Beckett and Harold Shedd. It was one of two albums Wright would release under the label. Wright co-wrote five of the ten tracks on the record. The album contains the singles "He's a Good Ole Boy", "Till I Was Loved by You", and "Sea of Cowboy Hats". None of these singles reached top 40 on the Billboard Hot Country Songs charts. The album received mixed to positive critical reception for its lyrical content and sound.

== Background and content ==
Woman in the Moon was recorded in Nashville, Tennessee, United States and consisted of ten tracks. Both Barry Beckett and Harold Shedd produced the album. Half of the album's tracks were either written or co-written by Wright. These tracks included "Till All Her Tears Are Dry", "Go On and Go", and "Sea of Cowboy Hats", which would later be released as a single. The album also included a cover of Bill Anderson's "Nobody But a Fool (Would Love You)", which was a top ten hit for Connie Smith in 1966. The seventh track "I Love You Enough to Let You Go" was co-written by country artist Keith Whitley. The album's second track "He's a Good Ole Boy" was composed by country music songwriter Harlan Howard, who had previously written songs for other well-known country artists.

Wright said that she was inspired by the songwriting of Bobby Braddock, particularly George Jones's "He Stopped Loving Her Today". When she began expressing interest in pursuing a country music career, she began working at Opryland USA theme park. She read industry magazines to determine the names of record producers and industry executives with whom she wanted to work. One such producer was Harold Shedd, whom she called repeatedly in search of songwriting advice. This led to the two having a meeting together, at which point she presented him with several songs she had written. After this meeting, Shedd helped her sign to Polydor Records' Nashville branch in 1994. When working with Shedd, Wright stated that she intentionally wanted to evoke "some of the production style from the '60s and '70s country music" and modernize it into "a jacked-up, '90s version of Connie Smith and Loretta Lynn."

== Release and reception ==
Woman in the Moon was released on August 9, 1994, on PolyGram and Mercury Records. It was distributed as both a compact disc and a cassette. The project accounted for three singles between 1994 and 1995. The album's lead single "He's a Good Ole Boy" was released in July 1994, peaking at number 58 on the Billboard Hot Country Singles & Tracks chart and number 55 on the Canadian RPM Country Tracks chart. The second single, "Till I Was Loved by You," was released in October 1994, peaking at number 48 on the country chart and number 66 on the RPM Country Tracks chart. The third single was the track "Sea of Cowboy Hats", which was released in 1995. The song reached a peak of 56 on the American country chart and 74 on the Canadian country chart that year.

The album was met with mixed to positive critical reception. Brett Milano of New Country rated the album 3 1/2 stars out of 5, saying that Wright "clearly loves a lyric with a meaty storyline" and "Wright also has a warmer romantic side, as...'Till I Was Loved by You' demonstrates, but most of these tracks suggest she's not a woman to be messed with." Milano's review also singled out "The Last Supper", noting that the subject of the song is "really planning to poison" her husband. Jennifer Barr of The Tampa Tribune gave the album three out of four stars, comparing Wright's phrasing favorably to Loretta Lynn. She also wrote that Wright "loads up her lyrics with enough female angst to make men all over America ashamed of themselves." A review by Dan DeLuca of Knight Ridder published in The Fresno Bee gave the album a "C". DeLuca praised "He's a Good Ole Boy" as "perfectly timely", and also spoke favorably of the Keith Whitley and Bill Anderson covers. DeLuca also noted the unusual nature of Wright co-writing several tracks on the album and relying less on Nashville-based songwriters. Of the songs written by Wright, he considered "Go On and Go" the strongest but called "Till I Was Loved by You" "perky" and "overbearing", and thought that "Sea of Cowboy Hats" was "a generic bid for the line-dance crowd".

While the album itself did not chart and its singles did not make top 40 on the country music charts, Wright won the 1994 Top New Female Vocalist award from the Academy of Country Music.

== Track listing ==
=== Compact disc and digital versions ===
No.	Title	Writer(s)	Length
1.	"Till I Was Loved by You"	Mark Irwin; Alan Jackson	2:57
2.	"He's a Good Ole Boy"	Harlan Howard	2:51
3.	"Till All Her Tears Are Dry"	Jim Rushing; Chely Wright	4:19
4.	"Go On and Go"	Dale Dodson; Wright	2:15
5.	"Woman in the Moon"	J. Fred Knobloch; Gary Scruggs	3:14
6.	"Sea of Cowboy Hats"	Dodson; Jimmy Melton; Wright	3:35
7.	"I Love You Enough to Let You Go"	Bill Caswell; Gary Nicholson; Keith Whitley	3:14
8.	"Nobody but a Fool"	Bill Anderson	3:08
9.	"He Don't Do Bars Anymore"	Dodson; Melton; Wright	2:45
10.	"The Last Supper"	Dodson; Melton; Wright	3:43

== Personnel ==
All credits for Woman in the Moon are adapted from Allmusic.

Musical personnel

- Eddie Bayers – drums, percussion
- Barry Beckett – keyboards
- Glen Duncan – fiddle
- Rob Hajacos – fiddle
- Owen Hale – drums
- Terry McMillan – harmonica
- Weldon Myrick – steel guitar
- Don Potter – acoustic guitar
- Brent Rowan – mandolin, electric guitar
- John Wesley Ryles – background vocals
- Harry Stinson – background vocals
- Cindy Richardson Walker – background vocals
- Dennis Wilson – background vocals
- Bob Wray – bass guitar
- Chely Wright – background vocals, lead vocals
- Curtis Young – background vocals

Technical personnel

- Terry Bates – assistant engineer
- Barry Beckett – producer
- Jim Burnett – mixing assistant
- Don Cobb – digital editing
- Mary Beth Felts – hairstylist and makeup
- Pete Greene – engineer
- Cynthia Grimson – executive art direction
- David Hall – assistant engineer
- Amy Hughes – assistant engineer
- Ron Keith – photography
- Patrick Kelly – assistant engineer
- Diane Painter – art direction and design
- Denny Purcell – mastering
- Ed Seay – mixing
- Harold Shedd – producer
