= Like Me: Confessions of a Heartland Country Singer =

2010 memoir by Chely Wright

- Cover of the first edition
- Author: Chely Wright
- Language: English
- Publisher: Random House, Inc.
- Publication date: May 4, 2010
- Publication place: United States
- Media type: Print (Paperback)
- Pages: 286
- ISBN: 9780307378866

Like Me: Confessions of a Heartland Country Singer is the memoir of American activist, author and country music artist Chely Wright. The book was released on May 4, 2010 and was published by Random House, Inc. It was Wright's first book and was part of the process she took into coming out as a lesbian in 2010.

== Background ==
Like Me chronicles Wright's path to stardom in the country music industry. It also focused on her struggle to fully acknowledge her homosexuality throughout her life. The memoir begins with discussing her childhood conflicts associated between her career dreams and sexual orientation. It also explains the several heterosexual and homosexual relationships Wright had throughout up until the age of 40. In the book, she also describes the turning point when she nearly took her own life in 2006. That moment, as described in the memoir, signifies how Wright decided to come out publicly and begin writing Like Me. The memoir consisted of 59 small chapters and totaled to 286 pages.

== Release and reception ==
Like Me was released on May 4, 2010 and was published by Random House, Inc. The book was released the same day that Wright publicly came out as a lesbian. The release coincided with her 2010 studio album, Lifted Off the Ground. The book was available in paperback and was sold to in-person and digital retailers. The book received favorable reviews after its release. Amanda Mark of the NY Journal of Books called it a "gut-wrenching story." Jack Feerick of Kirkus Reviews praised for being "unbelievably raw," specifically in reference to when Wright experienced several bouts of depression before coming out. He also called Wright's writing style to be "polished and careful." "The great achievement of Like Me is to give the reader a visceral sense of just how hard-earned that triumph is," he concluded.

== Awards and nominations ==
Year	Nominee / work	Award	Result	Ref.
2011	Lambda Literary Awards	Lesbian Memoir/Biography	Nominated	
