= Let Me In (Chely Wright album) =

1997 album by Chely Wright

Studio album by Chely Wright
- Released: September 9, 1997
- Genre: Country
- Length: 33:40
- Label: MCA Nashville
- Producer: Tony Brown

Chely Wright chronology
Right in the Middle of It (1996)	Let Me In (1997)	Single White Female (1999)

Singles from Let Me In
- 1. "Shut Up and Drive" Released: July 14, 1997; 2. "Just Another Heartache" Released: November 17, 1997; 3. "I Already Do" Released: March 16, 1998

Let Me In is the third studio album by American country music artist Chely Wright. The album was released on September 9, 1997 on MCA Nashville Records and was produced by Tony Brown. Let Me In was Wright's first album to chart on the Billboard Magazine album charts and also spawned her first Top 40 singles. It was also the first of three albums Wright recorded for the MCA Nashville label.

== Background ==
Let Me In was recorded in Nashville, Tennessee, United States and contained ten tracks of recorded material. The album's producer, Tony Brown, was known for producing other well-known artists on the MCA Nashville label, such as George Strait and Reba McEntire. Brian Wahlert of Country Standard Time found that the albums' production seemed to be marketed towards country pop, calling the album itself a "country-pop gem". Thom Owens of Allmusic found that producer Tony Brown seemed to have stripped the album's production "down to the core". Owens explained that, "for much of Let Me In, she's singing over clean acoustic arrangements; only a few cuts are adorned with pop/rock instrumentation. Wright benefits from the spare arrangements, which only emphasize her lovely voice and charisma." The album's ninth track, "Feelin' Single - Seein' Double", was a cover version of the original song by American country artist Emmylou Harris, found on her 1975 album Elite Hotel. Three of the album's ten tracks were co-written by Wright, including the set opener "Your Woman Misses Her Man", "I Already Do" (which would eventually be released as a single), and "Is It Love Yet".

== Critical reception ==
Professional ratings
Review scores
Source	Rating
Allmusic	4/5 stars
Entertainment Weekly	(B+)

Let Me In mainly received positive reviews from critics. Country Standard Time's Brian Walhert said that the album's first five songs were "masterfully crafted", calling the third track "Shut Up and Drive" to combine both "sympathy" and "quiet urgency". Walhert also praised the fourth track "Emma Jean's Guitar" for its storyline and plot. Walhert then commented that the album seemed to of gone "downhill" after the fifth track saying, "But then the music starts to go downhill with "Just Another Heartache," sounding like filler for a Lorrie Morgan album. Wright's vocals are always warm and sweet with a slight twang. Here's hoping she comes up with better songs next time out." Alanna Nash of Entertainment Weekly gave Let Me In a "B+" rating stating, "...on Let Me In, she turns her commanding alto to a fine program of contemporary country, including the title ballad and "Emma Jean's Guitar," a left-field song about a pawnshop instrument and the stories it holds. An unexpected jewel.

Thom Owens of Allmusic also reviewed Let Me In and gave the album four out of five stars, stating that because of the album's production, "the result is her most accomplished and arguably best album to date."

== Release and singles ==
Let Me In spawned its third track "Shut Up and Drive" as the lead single in July 1997. The single became Wright's first Top 40 single as well as her first major hit single, reaching #14 on the Billboard Hot Country Singles and Tracks chart, #112 on the Bubbling Under Hot 100 singles chart, and also #21 on the Canadian RPM Country Singles chart. The second single released was the album's sixth track "Just Another Heartache" in November 1997. The single eventually peaked at #39 on the Billboard Hot Country Singles and Tracks chart and #51 on the Canadian RPM Country Singles chart. The third and final single spawned from Let Me In was the track "I Already Do" in March 1998. The song peaked at #36 on the Billboard country chart and #59 on the Canadian RPM country chart. Let Me In was officially released on September 9, 1997 on MCA Nashville Records via a compact disc. The album became Wright's first release to chart on the Billboard album charts, peaking at #25 on the Billboard Top Country Albums chart, #171 on the Billboard 200, and #10 on the Top Heatseekers chart. In addition, Let Me In also peaked at #23 on the Canadian RPM Country Albums/CDs chart in 1998.

== Track listing ==
No.	Title	Writer(s)	Length
1.	"Your Woman Misses Her Man"	Ed Hill, Mark D. Sanders, Chely Wright	3:02
2.	"Let Me In"	Deanna Bryant	3:58
3.	"Shut Up and Drive"	Rivers Rutherford, Annie Tate, Sam Tate	3:49
4.	"Emma Jean's Guitar"	Matraca Berg, Jeff Hanna, Gary Harrison	3:49
5.	"I Already Do"	Gary Burr, Wright	3:47
6.	"Just Another Heartache"	Hill, Sanders	2:41
7.	"Is It Love Yet?"	Kostas, Wright	3:01
8.	"Before You Lie"	Burr, Bob McDill	3:52
9.	"Feelin' Single - Seein' Double"	Wayne Kemp	2:31
10.	"10 Lb. Heart"	Nick Pellegrino, Kenya Walker	4:12

== Personnel ==
- Bob Bailey – background vocals
- Eddie Bayers – drums
- Matraca Berg – background vocals
- Tony Brown – piano
- Gary Burr – background vocals
- Stuart Duncan – fiddle, mandolin
- Kim Fleming – background vocals
- Paul Franklin – pedabro, steel guitar
- Steve Gibson – acoustic guitar, electric guitar
- Vince Gill – background vocals
- Vicki Hampton – background vocals
- John Jarvis – piano, electric piano
- Kostas – background vocals
- Brent Mason – acoustic guitar, electric guitar
- Steve Nathan – Hammond organ, synthesizer
- Michael Rhodes – bass
- Tom Roady – percussion
- Matt Rollings – keyboards, piano, Hammond organ
- John Wesley Ryles – background vocals
- Stewart Smith – electric guitar
- Harry Stinson – background vocals
- Robby Turner – Dobro, steel guitar
- Billy Joe Walker Jr. – acoustic guitar
- Chely Wright – lead vocals, background vocals
- Trisha Yearwood – background vocals

== Sales chart positions ==
=== Album ===
Chart (1997)	Peak position
U.S. Billboard 200	171
U.S. Billboard Top Country Albums	25
U.S. Billboard Top Heatseekers	10
Canadian RPM Country Albums/CD's	23
UK Country Albums (OCC)	7

=== Singles ===
Year	Song	Chart positions		
Year	Song	US Country	US	CAN Country
1997	"Shut Up and Drive"	14	112	21
1997	"Just Another Heartache"	39	—	51
1998	"I Already Do"	36	—	59
"—" denotes releases that did not chart.
