= Wish Me Away =

2011 American documentary film

- Directed by: Bobbie Birleffi; Beverly Kopf
- Produced by: Bobbie Birleffi, Beverly Kopf
- Cinematography: Paul Mailman
- Edited by: Lisa Palattella
- Production company: First Run Features
- Release dates: June 22, 2011 (Frameline); June 1, 2012 (United States)
- Running time: 96 minutes
- Country: United States
- Language: English

Wish Me Away is a 2011 documentary film directed by Bobbie Birleffi and Beverly Kopf. Winner of 12 film festival awards, it is about the coming out of the country music singer and gay rights activist Chely Wright. In May 2010, she had become the first major country music performer to publicly come out as gay.

The feature-length documentary is being screened at various venues and festivals between May and July 2012. The film opens in New York on June 1, 2012, in Los Angeles and other big American cities on June 15. The documentary is a personal and intimate look at Wright, who after a lifetime of hiding, shatters cultural and religious stereotypes within Nashville, her conservative heartland family, and most importantly, herself. It was filmed over a period of 3 years, portraying her struggle, private video diaries, plans to come out publicly. Using interviews with Chely, her family, key players in Nashville and her management team, the film goes deep into Chely's story, her relationship with Brad Paisley and their break-up. It also chronicles her coming out and the aftermath of her decision to come out on Nashville, her small hometown and the LGBT community.

The film opened in New York City at the Quad Cinema in June 2012 where it played for two weeks. Wish Me Away made its national television premiere on Nov. 15, 2012 on Showtime. The film reached as high as #2 on iTunes Movie Rental Chart and has been one of the top rented films played on Netflix in 2012.

Besides Chely Wright, characters appearing in documentary include Stan Wright, Jennifer Wright, Russell Carter, Rodney Crowell, Victoria Wilson, Rev. C. Welton Gaddy, Don Cusic, Howard Bragman, Richard Sterban, Charlene Daniels, Chuck D. Walter, Rosie O'Donnell, Meredith Vieira, Natalie Morales.

The theme song from the film is "Shine a Light", recorded by Chely Wright for the film, produced by Linda Perry. All music in the film, was recorded by Chely Wright.

Original Score by Jay Howlett and Rolfe Wyer.

Music Supervised by Lisa Palattella

== Awards ==
Los Angeles Film Festival
WINNER Grand Jury Prize, Best Documentary Feature

Frameline 35
WINNER San Francisco International LGBT Festival, Outstanding Documentary Feature

Nashville Film Festival
WINNER Audience Award, Best Documentary

Palm Springs International Film Festival
WINNER Audience Award, Best Documentary

Melbourne Australia LGBT Festival
WINNER Audience Award, Best Documentary

Seattle LGBT Festival
WINNER Audience Award, Favorite Documentary Film

Salem Film Festival
WINNER Alliance of Women Film Journalists “EDA AWARD”: Best Female Directed Film.

Philadelphia Q Fest
WINNER Jury Award, Best Documentary

Tallgrass Film Festival, Kansas
WINNER Golden Strand Award, Best Documentary

Pittsburgh LGBT Festival
WINNER Best Documentary

Fresno Real Pride Film Festival
WINNER Audience Award, Best Documentary

Atlanta Out on Film Festival
WINNER Jury Award, Best Documentary

Newfest Film Festival, New York City
CENTERPIECE
