= Right in the Middle of It =

1996 album by Chely Wright

Studio album by Chely Wright
- Released: January 9, 1996
- Studio: Money Pit; Music Mill
- Genre: Country
- Length: 37:52
- Label: PolyGram; Mercury
- Producer: Ed Seay; Harold Shedd

Chely Wright chronology
Woman in the Moon (1994)	Right in the Middle of It (1996)	Let Me In (1997)

Singles from Right in the Middle of It
- 1. "Listenin' to the Radio" Released: October 6, 1995; 2. "The Love That We Lost" Released: January 19, 1996; 3. "The Love He Left Behind" Released: May 10, 1996

Right in the Middle of It is the second album by American country artist Chely Wright. The album was released January 9, 1996, on PolyGram/Mercury Records, co-produced by Ed Seay and Harold Shedd. Although praised by AllMusic, the album was not successful. Three of its singles charted on the North American country charts. After this, Wright left the label.

== Background ==
Following her unsuccessful first album, Woman in the Moon, Right in the Middle of It was recorded in Nashville, Tennessee, at the Music Mill and Money Pit studios. Right in the Middle of It contained 11 tracks of material. Three songs were either written or co-written by Wright: the title track, "The Other Woman", and "Gotta Get Good at Givin' Again". The album's production and sound mainly consisted of a traditional country sound that included both uptempo and ballad songs. Charlotte Dillon of Allmusic commented that the album's production included much of "natural country twang". The tenth track on the recording entitled "It's Not Too Late" was co-written by American country artist Tracy Byrd. The sixth track "What I Learned from Loving You" was originally recorded by Lynn Anderson and was a Top 20 country single for her in 1983.

== Critical reception ==
Professional ratings
Review scores
Source	Rating
Allmusic	4.5/5 stars

Right in the Middle of It received a positive review from Charlotte Dillon of Allmusic. Dillon gave Right in the Middle of It four and a half out five stars, calling it Wright's "album pick". Dillon praised Wright for having the ability to record both ballads and have enough energy to record uptempo country numbers as well. Dillon also stated that many of Wright's musical influences (such as Connie Smith and Buck Owens) have shown influence on many of the album's individual tracks. In addition, Dillon praised Wright's musical experience, stating, "This might only be her second album, but she's had plenty of singing experience, starting with family get-togethers when she was a small child, where singalongs with fiddles and guitars were the norm. Before she hit her teens she had already formed a country band of her own. Early on Wright was exposed to music greats like Loretta Lynn, Buck Owens, Connie Smith, and Conway Twitty. Many of those influences can be heard in the songs on Right in the Middle of It."

== Release and chart performance ==
=== Singles ===
Right in the Middle of It spawned three officially released singles between 1995 and 1996. The album's lead single, "Listenin' to the Radio" was released on October 6, 1995, as the lead single. It was not very successful, only reaching number 66 on the US Billboard Hot Country Songs chart, then known as Hot Country Singles & Tracks. It also briefly charted in Canada, reaching number 84 on the RPM Country Tracks. The follow-up single, "The Love That We Lost", was released on January 19, 1996 and became a bigger hit. It nearly became Wright's first top-40 hit in the US, peaking at number 41 on the Billboard Hot Country Songs chart. It also nearly cracked the top-50 in Canada, peaking at number 51 on the RPM Country Tracks. The third and final single, "The Love He Left Behind", was released on May 10, 1996. It was Wright's first single to completely fail to enter the country charts in either the US or Canada, although it did enter the Cashbox Country Singles chart, peaking at number 74 on June 29, 1996.

=== Album ===
Right in the Middle of It was officially released on January 9, 1996, on PolyGram/Mercury Records. It was issued originally as a compact disc and a cassette. After two low-selling albums, Wright left PolyGram/Mercury and signed a deal with MCA Nashville.

== Track listings ==
=== Compact disc and digital versions ===
Right in the Middle of It (CD and digital versions)
No.	Title	Writer(s)	Length
1.	"Listenin' to the Radio"	Sunny Russ; Stephony Smith	3:33
2.	"The Love That We Lost"	Gary Burr; Monty Powell	3:49
3.	"Heart Shaped World"	Kent Blazy; Bob DiPiero; Kim Williams	2:33
4.	"The Love He Left Behind"	Steven Dale Jones; Bobby Tomberlin	3:38
5.	"Right in the Middle of It"	Chely Wright	3:03
6.	"What I Learned from Loving You"	James Hooker; Russell Smith	3:48
7.	"Alligator Purse"	Nick Pellegrino; Kenya Slaughter Walker	3:26
8.	"The Other Woman"	Wright	3:53
9.	"Day One"	Marv Green; Wendell Mobley	3:00
10.	"It's Not Too Late"	Tracy Byrd; Bill Rice; Sharon Rice	3:32
11.	"Gotta Get Good at Givin' Again"	Wright	3:37

=== Cassette versions ===
Right in the Middle of It (Side one)
No.	Title	Writer(s)	Length
1.	"Listenin' to the Radio"	Russ; S. Smith	3:33
2.	"The Love That We Lost"	Burr; Powell	3:49
3.	"Heart Shaped World"	Blazy; DiPiero; Williams	2:33
4.	"The Love He Left Behind"	Jones; Tomberlin	3:38
5.	"Right in the Middle of It"	Wright	3:03
6.	"What I Learned from Loving You"	Hooker; R. Smith	3:48

Right in the Middle of It (Side two)
No.	Title	Writer(s)	Length
1.	"Alligator Purse"	Pellegrino; Walker	3:26
2.	"The Other Woman"	Wright	3:53
3.	"Day One"	Green; Mobley	3:00
4.	"It's Not Too Late"	Byrd; B. Rice; S. Rice	3:32
5.	"Gotta Get Good at Givin' Again"	Wright	3:37

== Personnel ==
All credits for Right in the Middle of It are adapted from Allmusic.

=== Musical personnel ===
- Eddie Bayers – drums
- Larry Byrom – electric guitar
- Butch Carr – triangle
- Joe Chemay – bass
- Tod Culross – clapping
- Cindy Fee – background vocals
- Larry Franklin – fiddle, mandolin
- Paul Franklin – dobro, steel guitar
- John Hobbs – hammond organ, piano, synthesizer, wurlitzer
- Dann Huff – electric guitar
- Mark Lambert – programming
- Anthony Martin – background vocals
- Joey Miskulin – accordion
- Wendell Mobley – background vocals
- John Wesley Ryles – background vocals
- Ed Seay – acoustic guitar
- Mitch Shedd – clapping
- Jimmy Stewart – clapping
- Tiffany Suiters — clapping
- Billy Joe Walker, Jr. – acoustic guitar, electric guitar
- Cindy Richardson Walker – background vocals
- Biff Watson – acoustic guitar, electric guitar
- Dennis Wilson – background vocals
- Chely Wright – background vocals, lead vocals
- Curtis Young – background vocals
- Russ Zavitson – clapping

=== Technical personnel ===
- Don Cobb – editing
- Todd Culross – assistant engineer
- Carlos Grier – editing
- Erik Hellerman – assistant engineer
- Mark Lambert – programmer
- Anthony Martin – assistant engineer
- Denny Purcell – mastering
- Ed Seay – engineer, mixing, producer
- Harold Shedd – producer

== Release history ==
Region	Date	Format	Label	Ref.
United States	January 9, 1996	Compact disc	PolyGram; Mercury Records	
United States	January 9, 1996	Cassette	PolyGram; Mercury Records	
United States	2010s	Digital download; streaming	Mercury Records	
