= Unispace =

UK company that specialises in office interiors

Unispace is a company that specialises in office interiors. They were awarded a total of £680m of PPE contracts in relation to the COVID-19 pandemic. According to The Guardian, a founder of the company contacted Michael Gove directly prior to the award of the contract.

The Times and The Guardian have both reported that the company has links to the Plymouth Brethren, and that companies associated with the Brethren were allocated in total over £2bn of government PPE contracts.
