= Jezebel (Chely Wright song) =

Single by Chely Wright

from the album Never Love You Enough
- B-side: "Never Love You Enough"
- Released: December 3, 2001
- Studio: The Money Pit (Nashville, TN); Loud Recording Studios (Nashville, TN)
- Genre: Country
- Length: 3:10
- Label: MCA Nashville
- Songwriters: Jay DeMarcus; Marcus Hummon
- Producers: Paul Worley; Chely Wright

Chely Wright singles chronology
"Never Love You Enough" (2001)	"Jezebel" (2001)	"Back of the Bottom Drawer" (2004)

"Jezebel" is a song by American country music artist Chely Wright. The song was written by Rascal Flatts member Jay DeMarcus, who was once part of her tour band, and Marcus Hummon, with the song being produced by Wright and Paul Worley. MCA Nashville released the single to country radio on December 3, 2001 as the second and final single from Wright's fifth studio album Never Love You Enough (2001). It was also her final single for the label.

This single reached number 23 on the US Billboard Hot Country Songs chart.

== Content ==
The song is an up-tempo "fusion of contemporary country and traditional elements" about a woman confronting another woman with whom her man has had an affair.

== Critical reception ==
Deborah Evans Price of Billboard reviewed the song favorably, comparing the song's theme to "Jolene" by Dolly Parton: "[w]hile 'Jolene' left Parton begging with the temptress to release her man, 'Jezebel' finds Wright passionately staking her claim and boldly confronting her competition." She also praised Wright's "engaging vocal personality" and the production.

== Music video ==
The music video for "Jezebel" was directed by Trey Fanjoy. The video was added to the playlists of both CMT and Great American Country on December 5, 2001.

=== Synopsis ===
The video opens up with Wright in what seems to be in a hotel. There are cut scenes that feature her boyfriend in a nightclub with another woman, the "Jezebel" in this case. Fearing her boyfriend is cheating on her, Wright decides to visit a psychic. The psychic uses tarot cards to read into what her boyfriend is doing. In the next scene, Wright is shown playing with a voodoo doll. She uses the doll on the other woman, making her sweat and accidentally dropping her wine on herself. The following scene then shows Wright outside her apartment building in the rain, waiting for her lover to come home. The other woman is then left alone in the soaking rain, while Wright's boyfriend returns back to her, following the lyrics of the song.

== Chart performance ==
"Jezebel" debuted on the US Billboard Hot Country Songs chart the week of December 22, 2001, at number 50, becoming the "Hot Shot Debut" of the week. Slowly, the song rose up to its peak of number 23 on the chart the week of April 13, 2002, spending 20 weeks in total. On the Radio & Records country chart, it debuted at number 48 the week of December 14, 2001. It reached number 18 on April 6, 2002.

== Personnel ==
Taken from the Never Love You Enough liner notes.

- Paul Leim – drums
- David Huff – drum programming
- Michael Rhodes – bass
- Darrell Scott – acoustic guitar, banjo, mandolin, background vocals
- Marcus Hummon – acoustic guitar, background vocals
- J. T. Corenflos – electric guitar
- John Hobbs – piano, b-3
- Stuart Duncan – fiddle
- Dan Tyminski – background vocals
- Barry Bales – background vocals
- Wes Hightower – background vocals
- Troy Johnson – background vocals
- Chely Wright – background vocals

== Charts ==
=== Weekly charts ===
Chart (2001–2002)	Peak position
US Hot Country Songs (Billboard)	23
US Country Top 50 (Radio & Records)	18

=== Year-end charts ===
Chart (2002)	Position
US Country Songs (Billboard)	74
US Country (Radio & Records)	79
