= Shut Up and Drive (Chely Wright song) =

Single by Chely Wright

from the album Let Me In
- Released: July 14, 1997
- Recorded: 1997
- Genre: Country
- Length: 3:49
- Label: MCA Nashville
- Songwriters: Rivers Rutherford, Sam Tate, Annie Tate
- Producer: Tony Brown

Chely Wright singles chronology
"The Love He Left Behind" (1996)	"Shut Up and Drive" (1997)	"Just Another Heartache" (1998)

"Shut Up and Drive" is a song written by Rivers Rutherford, Annie Tate, and Sam Tate, and recorded by American country music singer Chely Wright. It was released in July 1997 as the first single from her album Let Me In, her first album for MCA Nashville. The song brought Wright to the country top 40 for the first time, with a peak of #14 on Billboard Hot Country Singles & Tracks (now Hot Country Songs).

== Content and history ==
Songwriters Annie and Sam Tate, who are husband and wife, co-wrote the song with Rivers Rutherford. Annie came up with the song's title and first verse, but she did not think that the idea had potential until presenting it to Sam. The two then took their ideas to Rutherford, who then came up with the chorus to help complete the song. "Shut Up and Drive" is composed in the key of A-flat major with a main chord pattern of A♭-D♭-A♭-E♭-A♭. The song features uncredited background vocals from Trisha Yearwood.

== Critical reception ==
Brian Wahlert of Country Standard Time described the song favorably in his review of the album, saying that it "simmers with a combination of sympathy and quiet urgency until Wright wails demandingly on the chorus, 'I'm the voice you never listen to/And I had to break your heart to make you see.'"

== Music video ==
The music video was directed by Charley Randazzo and premiered in mid-1997. It shows Wright performing the song in a loft, as well as her driving a VW Beetle Convertible through many sceneries. She is also seen getting ready to leave from her boyfriend, despite a locket on her steering wheel and picture of the two on the dash. Her boyfriend is seen waking up from a nap, possibly having heard the ignition start, and is confused when she drives away. A traffic jam scene is then shown, and as she patiently waits for it to clear, her boyfriend runs up to her car, but she finds an open lane and drives away, leaving him in the dust. It is then shown that he was the one that caused the jam, as several people get out of their cars and reprimand him, already ashamed of her breaking up with him.

== Chart performance ==
With its number 14 peak on the U.S. country singles charts, "Shut Up and Drive" is Wright's first top 40 country hit.

== Charts ==
Chart (1997)	Peak position
Canada Country Singles (RPM)	21
US Bubbling Under Hot 100 (Billboard)	12
US Hot Country Songs (Billboard)	14
