= The Bumper of My SUV =

Single by Chely Wright

from the album The Metropolitan Hotel
- Released: November 8, 2004
- Genre: Country
- Length: 4:41
- Label: Dualtone; Painted Red
- Songwriter: Chely Wright
- Producer: Chely Wright

Chely Wright singles chronology
"Everything" (2004)	"The Bumper of My SUV" (2004)	"The River" (2005)

"The Bumper of My SUV" is a song written, produced, and recorded, by American country music artist Chely Wright, recorded for her sixth studio album The Metropolitan Hotel (2005). Wright wrote the song following an incident in which a lady in a minivan told her she was supporting "baby killers", in reference to the United States Marine Corps. Her brother is a Marine. It first garnered attention when Wright performed the song for troops in Iraq. Wright was initially hesitant to making it a single.

It was released on November 8, 2004, via Dualtone Records and Wright's own Painted Red Records as the second single from the album. It initially only reached number 54 on the US Hot Country Songs chart, marking her lowest peaking single since "She Went Out for Cigarettes" from 2000. Following a deceptive campaign in which members of Wright's fan club pretended to be friends or family members of military members to request the song be played, it was re-released in early 2005. This re-issue would go on to peak at number 35, becoming not only Wright's last top-40 hit to date but her most recent entry to the chart as of 2024.

== Background and writing ==
The song was inspired by an actual incident, according to Wright. She told Billboard magazine that in mid-2003, she was driving in Nashville when a motorist in a minivan behind her noticed the Marine Corps sticker on the artist's bumper. Wright's brother is a Marine who sent her the sticker before he shipped off to Iraq. Wright said that the woman began honking, swerving and flicking her lights. "I look in the rear view, and she's flipping me the bird, hard, I thought I cut her off, because I'm a really bad driver." She went on to say that when the woman finally pulled up next to her and motioned for her to roll down her window she screamed "Your war is wrong. You're a baby killer." She went home and immediately wrote the song.

== Content ==
Written entirely by Wright, the song is a ballad, accompanied almost exclusively by piano. Its lyrics are a first-person account of a woman who is driving her SUV. She is given the finger by another driver, because she (the singer) has "a bright red sticker for the U.S. Marines / on the bumper of [her] SUV". The singer then defends her sticker, stating that her family served in the Marines. Wright has stated that she did not intend for the song to be pro-war. In addition, she has stated that she recorded the song begrudgingly, and did not intend for it to be a single.

== Wright's fan club ==
While the song was climbing the charts, it was discovered that members of Wright's fan club were contacting radio stations nationwide, requesting increased airplay for the song to help it climb the charts. These fan club members had posed as family or friends of military members when making their requests. After discovering the actions of her fan club's members, Wright fired the club's leader, with whom she had been friends since 1996.

== Critical reception ==
Allmusic critic Stephen Thomas Erlewine, in his review of The Metropolitan Hotel, described the song as follows: "[T]he cloying 'The Bumper of My S.U.V.' is well-intentioned but is one of the more awkward Iraqi war songs — but those missteps only enhance the feeling that this album is a personal work for Wright, and that she's willing to make mistakes along the way."

The Onion reviews this song as follows: "As far as jingoistic songs go, Chely Wright's "The Bumper Of My SUV" is pretty tame, essentially an examination of blue-red relations. Still, it's pretty hilarious: A woman in a mini-van gives Wright the finger, and Wright assumes it's because she has a U.S. Marines bumper sticker on her SUV. Hey Chely, maybe it's because you're taking up two lanes or wasting what's left of the earth's petroleum. Who knew that pro-America country singers—with especially overwrought Southern accents—hated minivans and private school?"

== Commercial performance ==
"The Bumper of My SUV" debuted on the Billboard Hot Country Singles & Tracks chart (now known as Hot Country Songs) the week of November 20, 2004, at number 54. It entered the top-40 of the chart the week of January 15, 2005, at number 38, becoming her first top-40 hit since "Back of the Bottom Drawer" reached number 40 back on May 8, 2004. It reached a peak position of number 35 on February 5, 2005; it stayed 19 weeks in total on the chart. As of 2024, it is Wright's most recent entry on the chart to date.

== Music video ==
The music video features her performance of the song on the Grand Ole Opry intercut with footage shot during her visits with troops in Iraq.

== Charts ==
=== Original version ===
Chart (2004)	Peak position
US Hot Country Songs (Billboard)	54

=== Re-release ===
Chart (2005)	Peak position
US Hot Country Songs (Billboard)	35
US Hot Country Singles Sales (Billboard)	1
US Hot Singles Sales (Billboard)	4
