= Lifted Off the Ground =

2010 album by Chely Wright

Studio album by Chely Wright
- Released: April 30, 2010
- Recorded: 2007–2010
- Genre: Country
- Length: 44:37
- Labels: Vanguard, EMI
- Producer: Rodney Crowell

Chely Wright chronology
The Definitive Collection (2007)	Lifted Off the Ground (2010)	I Am the Rain (2016)

Singles from Lifted Off the Ground
- 1. "Broken" Released: April 21, 2010; 2. "Damn Liar-Dance Remix" Released: March 29, 2011

Lifted Off the Ground is the seventh studio album from singer-songwriter Chely Wright. The album was released on April 30, 2010, and coincided with the release of her first memoir, Like Me: Confessions of a Heartland Country Singer. Within two weeks of the album's release, it was estimated to have sold nearly 6,000 copies.

== Background ==
After nearly a two-year hiatus, Wright resurfaced through social networking sites including MySpace, Facebook and YouTube. Wright would create general blog entries about her life, touring and other miscellaneous events. In September 2007, she announced she was working on her next studio album with country singer Rodney Crowell. As time progressed, Wright would update viewers on the status of the album. Originally, the album was titled "Notes to the Coroner" with a released date in the fall of 2008. Wright's official website highlight tracks such as, "Broken", "Wish Me Away", "Object of Your Rejection", "Damn Liar" and "Notes to the Coroner".

During this time, Wright's record company wanted her to write happier songs, stating her songs about failed relationships were too dark and depressing. Wright was told to write something "positive and hopeful". She responded with the song "Something Positive and Hopeful", a satirical look on her past relationships set to a happy tune that her record company requested. The song was performed at fan gala in Nashville where Wright jokingly mentioned she hoped the song would be included on her album. Wright eventually placed the album on hold to focus on writing more songs. In January 2010, it was revealed her album would be released in May 2010 along with a memoir.

== Promotion ==
Promotion for the album began with Wright appearing in People revealing her homosexuality. Since the announcement, Wright has appeared on the Today Show, NPR, Access Hollywood, The Joy Behar Show, Rosie Radio, Good Day L.A., ABC World News and The Oprah Winfrey Show. She was featured in MTV News, Edge, Entertainment Weekly and The Advocate. Wright went on a book signing and concert tour to promote the album.

== Reception ==
Professional ratings
Review scores
Source	Rating
Allmusic	4/5 stars
Engine 145	4/5 stars
Roughstock	3.5/5 stars
The L.A. Times	2.5/4 stars
Country Weekly	3/4 stars

The album received several positive reviews. Thom Jurek (AllMusic) stated the album was, "[…] is easily the most harrowing and lovely recording in Wrights catalog". Blake Boldt (Engine 145) cites the album is "[…] a more complex, complete album then she's ever record, Wright has, for once, found some release".

Amongst the many positive reviews there were a few mixed or negative reviews. Stormy Lewis (Roughstock) states, "Lifted off the Ground is neither as cohesive nor expressive as [Single White Female] was. It does however, have moments of nearly pure bliss. What you will not find on this album is an “Unknown” or “She Went out for Cigarettes.” What you will find on this album is the next best things. And, for some songs, that is almost good enough." Margaret Wappler (The L.A. Times) writes, […]But where's the teeth? Sure, she sounds mad on 'Damn Liar' but as far as making statements about her 'lifestyle,' in a genre often defined by traditional notions of sexuality and family, Wright treads lightly."

== Track listing ==
All tracks are written by Chely Wright.

Standard edition
No.	Title	Length
1.	"Broken"	3:37
2.	"Heavenly Days" (co-written with Rodney Crowell)	3:44
3.	"Hang Out in Your Heart"	4:29
4.	"Notes to the Coroner"	3:27
5.	"Snow Globe"	3:33
6.	"Like Me"	3:51
7.	"That Train"	4:19
8.	"Damn Liar"	4:04
9.	"Wish Me Away"	3:37
10.	"Object of Your Rejection"	3:43
11.	"Shadows of Doubt"	6:18
Total length:		44:37

Bonus tracks
No.	Title	Length
12.	"Hamburg" (iTunes digital edition)	4:13
13.	"Don't Look Down" (Amazon digital edition)	4:17
Total length:		8:30

DVD
No.	Title	Length
14.	"My Life"	8:00
15.	"The Making of "Lifted Off the Ground""	20:00
16.	"I Have the Coolest Job"	10:00
17.	"Bumper of My SUV"	4:39
Total length:		42:39

== Personnel ==
- Rodney Crowell – acoustic guitar, background vocals
- Micol Davis – background vocals
- John Ferraro – drums
- Tanya Hancheroff – background vocals
- John Hobbs – keyboards, organ
- Jedd Hughes – acoustic guitar, electric slide guitar
- John Jorgenson – acoustic guitar, electric guitar, gut string guitar, mandolin, piano
- Will Kimbrough – acoustic guitar, acoustic slide guitar
- Tim Lauer – electric piano, keyboards, organ, piano, pump organ
- Jeremy Lister – background vocals
- Chris McHugh – drums
- Michael Rhodes – bass
- Chris Rodriguez – acoustic guitar, background vocals
- Randy Scruggs – acoustic guitar
- Kenny Vaughan – acoustic guitar, electric guitar
- Cheryl White – background vocals
- Chely Wright – acoustic guitar, lead vocals
- Jonathan Yudkin – cello, violin, viola

== Chart History ==
Chart (2010)	Peak position
US Billboard Top 200	200
US Billboard Country Albums	32
US Billboard Independent Albums	35
UK Country Albums (OCC)	8

== Release history ==
Region	Date	Label
Europe	April 30, 2010	Welk Music
North America	May 4, 2010	Vanguard
Australia	May 5, 2010	Vanguard
United Kingdom	May 5, 2010	Vanguard
