= Collin Raye discography =

- Studio albums: 13
- Extended plays: 1
- Compilation albums: 8
- Singles: 39
- Music videos: 27
- #1 Singles (U.S. & Canada): 7

The discography for Collin Raye, an American country music singer, comprises 12 studio albums and 39 singles. Four of Raye's singles have reached Number One on the U.S. country singles charts: "Love, Me," "In This Life," "My Kind of Girl" and "I Can Still Feel You." Twenty-one of his singles have reached Top 10 on the same chart, including 14 singles reaching the top 10 consecutively between 1991 and 1996.

Besides his peaks on the country charts, Raye has reached the Billboard Hot 100 four times: first with the #87 peak of "One Boy, One Girl" in 1995, then with the #37 of "Someone You Used to Know" in 1998. His other two were "Anyone Else" which reached #37 in 1999 and "Couldn't Last a Moment" which reached #43 in 2000. Two of his singles charted on the U.S. adult contemporary singles chart: "In This Life" reached #21 in 1992 and "The Gift" which featured Jim Brickman and Susan Ashton reached #3 in 1997.

== Studio albums ==
=== 1990s ===
Title	Album details	Peak chart positions			Certifications (sales thresholds)
Title	Album details	US Country	US	CAN Country	Certifications (sales thresholds)
All I Can Be	Release date: August 27, 1991; Label: Epic Nashville; Formats: CD, cassette	7	54	—	CAN: Gold; US: Platinum
In This Life	Release date: August 25, 1992; Label: Epic Nashville; Formats: CD, cassette	10	42	12	CAN: Gold; US: Platinum
Extremes	Release date: January 25, 1994; Label: Epic Nashville; Formats: CD, cassette	12	73	—	CAN: Platinum; US: Platinum
I Think About You	Release date: August 22, 1995; Label: Epic Nashville; Formats: CD, cassette	5	40	13	CAN: Platinum; US: Platinum
The Walls Came Down	Release date: July 14, 1998; Label: Epic Nashville; Formats: CD, cassette	8	55	13	US: Gold
"—" denotes releases that did not chart

=== 2000s ===
Title	Album details	Peak chart positions	
Title	Album details	US Country	US
Tracks^{[A]}	Release date: May 2, 2000; Label: Epic Nashville; Formats: CD, cassette	9	81
Can't Back Down	Release date: October 30, 2001; Label: Epic Nashville; Formats: CD, cassette	39	—
Twenty Years and Change	Release date: October 25, 2005; Label: Aspirion Records; Formats: CD, music download	73	—
Fearless	Release date: December 5, 2006; Label: Country Roads; Formats: CD, music download	—	—
Never Going Back	Release date: April 28, 2009; Label: Saguaro Road; Formats: CD, music download	40	—
"—" denotes releases that did not chart

=== 2010s ===
Title	Album details
His Love Remains	Release date: October 25, 2011; Label: Cradle Concepts; Formats: CD, music download
Still on the Line… The Songs of Glen Campbell	Release date: December 6, 2013; Label: Cradle Concepts; Formats: CD, music download
Everlasting	Release date: December 2, 2014; Label: Goldenlane Records; Formats: CD, music download
Scars	Release date: October 30, 2020; Label: Audium Nashville / BFD; Formats: CD, music download

== Compilation albums ==
Title	Album details	Peak chart positions				Certifications (sales thresholds)
Title	Album details	US Country	US	CAN Country	CAN	Certifications (sales thresholds)
The Best of Collin Raye: Direct Hits	Release date: March 11, 1997; Label: Epic Nashville; Formats: CD, cassette	4	33	3	70	CAN: Platinum; US: Platinum
Love Songs	Release date: September 26, 2000; Label: Epic Nashville; Formats: CD, cassette	43	—	—	—	
16 Biggest Hits	Release date: September 24, 2002; Label: Epic Nashville; Formats: CD	—	—	—	—	
"—" denotes releases that did not chart

== Holiday albums ==
Title	Album details	Peak chart positions	
Title	Album details	US Country	US
Christmas: The Gift	Release date: October 29, 1996; Label: Epic Nashville; Formats: CD, cassette	23	126
A Family Christmas	Release date: 2008; Label: StarPointe Records; Formats: CD	—	—
"—" denotes releases that did not chart

== Children's music albums ==
Title	Album details	Peak positions
Title	Album details	US Kids
Counting Sheep	Release date: January 25, 2000; Label: Epic Nashville; Formats: CD, cassette	7

== Live albums ==
Title	Album details
Live at Billy Bob's Texas	Release date: August 31, 2004; Label: Smith Music Group; Formats: CD, music download

== Extended plays ==
Title	Album details
Selected Hits	Release date: June 26, 2007; Label: Starpointe Records; Formats: CD, music download

== Singles ==
=== 1991–2000 ===
Year	Single	Peak chart positions				Album
Year	Single	US Country	US	US AC	CAN Country	Album
1991	"All I Can Be (Is a Sweet Memory)"	29	—	—	35	All I Can Be
1991	"Love, Me"	1	—	—	1	All I Can Be
1992	"Every Second"	2	—	—	5	All I Can Be
1992	"In This Life"	1	—	21	1	In This Life
1992	"I Want You Bad (And That Ain't Good)"	7	—	—	14	In This Life
1993	"Somebody Else's Moon"	5	—	—	11	In This Life
1993	"That Was a River"	4	—	—	15	In This Life
1993	"That's My Story"	6	—	—	18	Extremes
1994	"Little Rock"	2	—	—	7	Extremes
1994	"Man of My Word"	8	—	—	5	Extremes
1994	"My Kind of Girl"	1	—	—	24	Extremes
1995	"If I Were You"	4	—	—	4	Extremes
1995	"One Boy, One Girl"	2	87	—	4	I Think About You
1995	"Not That Different"	3	114	—	10	I Think About You
1996	"I Think About You"	3	—	—	2	I Think About You
1996	"Love Remains"	12	—	—	20	I Think About You
1996	"What If Jesus Comes Back Like That"^{[B]}	21	—	—	22	I Think About You
1997	"On the Verge"	2	—	—	2	I Think About You
1997	"What the Heart Wants"	2	—	—	2	The Best of Collin Raye: Direct Hits
1997	"Little Red Rodeo"	3	—	—	1	The Best of Collin Raye: Direct Hits
1998	"I Can Still Feel You"	1	—	—	2	The Walls Came Down
1998	"Someone You Used to Know"	3	37	—	5	The Walls Came Down
1999	"Anyone Else"	4	37	—	1	The Walls Came Down
1999	"Start Over Georgia"	39	—	—	42	The Walls Came Down
2000	"Couldn't Last a Moment"	3	43	—	1	Tracks
2000	"Tired of Loving This Way" (with Bobbie Eakes)	50	—	—	76	Tracks
2000	"She's All That"	43	—	—	—	Tracks
"—" denotes releases that did not chart

=== 2001–present ===
Year	Single	Peak positions	Album
Year	Single	US Country	Album
2001	"You Still Take Me There"	47	Tracks
2001	"Ain't Nobody Gonna Take That from Me"	43	Can't Back Down
2002	"What I Need"	—	Can't Back Down
2004	"World History 101"	—	—N/a
2005	"I Know That's Right"	—	Twenty Years and Change
2006	"Hurricane Jane"	—	Twenty Years and Change
2007	"A Soldier's Prayer"	59	Selected Hits
2007	"Quitters"	—	Selected Hits
2009	"Mid-Life Chrysler"	—	Never Going Back
2009	"She's with Me"	—	Never Going Back
2011	"Undefeated"	—	His Love Remains
2012	"Never Gonna Stand for This"	—	—N/a
"—" denotes releases that did not chart

== Other singles ==
=== Featured singles ===
Year	Single	Artist	Peak chart positions			Album
Year	Single	Artist	US Country	US AC	CAN Country	Album
1997	"The Gift"^{[C]}	Jim Brickman (with Susan Ashton)	51	3	52	The Gift
2003	"Peace (Where the Heart Is)"	Jim Brickman	—	15	—	Peace
2014	"Some Real Good People"	Clinton Gregory	—	—	—	—N/a
"—" denotes releases that did not chart

=== Other charted songs ===
Year	Single	Peak positions	Album
Year	Single	US Country	Album
1992	"It Could Have Been So Good"	74	All I Can Be
1995	"What If Jesus Comes Back Like That"^{[B]}	57	I Think About You
1997	"Open Arms"	70	The Best of Collin Raye: Direct Hits

== Videography ==
=== Video albums ===
Title	Album details
The Power in You	Release date: 2007; Label: Starpointe Records; Formats: CD, DVD

=== Music videos ===
Year	Video	Director
1991	"All I Can Be (Is a Sweet Memory)"	Marius Penczner
1991	"Love, Me"	Peter Lippman
1992	"In This Life"	Michael Merriman
1992	"I Want You Bad (And That Ain't Good)"	Sherman Halsey
1993	"That Was a River"	Sherman Halsey
1993	"That's My Story"	Jon Small
1994	"Little Rock"	Sherman Halsey
1994	"My Kind of Girl"	Jon Small
1995	"One Boy, One Girl"	Jon Small
1995	"Not That Different"	Steven Goldmann
1996	"I Think About You"	Steven Goldmann
1996	"It Could Happen Again"	Dennis Goodman
1997	"On the Verge"	Norry Niven
1997	"The Gift" (with Jim Brickman and Susan Ashton)	Norry Niven
1998	"I Can Still Feel You"	Steven Goldmann
1998	"The Eleventh Commandment"	Deaton-Flanigen Productions
1999	"Anyone Else"	Chris Rogers
2000	"A Mother and Father's Prayer" (with Melissa Manchester)	Steven Goldmann
2000	"Couldn't Last a Moment"	Steven Goldmann
2000	"Tired of Loving This Way" (with Bobbie Eakes)	Jon Small
2000	"She's All That"	Jon Small
2001	"Ain't Nobody Gonna Take That from Me"	Peter Zavadil
2006	"Hurricane Jane"	Jason Horne
2007	"A Soldier's Prayer"	Christopher Burke
2008	"Quitters"	Matthew McLelland
2009	"She's with Me"	Matthew McLelland
2012	"Never Gonna Stand for This"	Glenn Sweitzer

== See also ==
- The Wrays

== Notes ==
- A Tracks also peaked at number 8 on the Canadian RPM Country Albums.
- B "What If Jesus Comes Back Like That" charted as an album cut in 1995 before being released as a single in 1996.
- C "The Gift" was released only to the Adult Contemporary format, and entered the country charts from unsolicited airplay.
