= The Best of Collin Raye: Direct Hits =

Greatest hits album by Collin Raye
- Released: August 26, 1997
- Studio: The Music Mill, The Money Pit, Emerald Sound Studios, Starstruck Studios, Soundshop Recording Studios and The Work Station (Nashville, Tennessee)
- Genre: Country
- Length: 49:55
- Label: Epic
- Producer: Jerry Fuller; Garth Fundis; John Hobbs; Collin Raye; Ed Seay; Billy Joe Walker Jr.; Paul Worley

Collin Raye chronology
Christmas: The Gift (1996)	The Best of Collin Raye: Direct Hits (1997)	The Walls Came Down (1998)

Singles from The Best of Collin Raye: Direct Hits
- 1. "What the Heart Wants" Released: June 2, 1997; 2. "Little Red Rodeo" Released: December 19, 1997

Professional ratings
Review scores
Source	Rating
Allmusic -	4.5/5 stars

The Best of Collin Raye: Direct Hits is American country music artist Collin Raye's first greatest hits album. Released on August 26, 1997, via Epic Records, the album contains the greatest hits from his first studio albums plus several new tracks.

Among the new recordings were three singles. "What the Heart Wants" and "Little Red Rodeo" were both Top 5 hits on the country charts. "The Gift", a collaboration with Jim Brickman and Susan Ashton, was released only to the adult contemporary format. Also included on the album is a cover of Journey's "Open Arms".

In October 1998 the album was certified Platinum by the RIAA.

== Track listing ==
No.	Title	Writer(s)	Length
1.	"Little Rock"	Tom Douglas	3:57
2.	"I Think About You"	Don Schlitz, Steve Seskin	3:26
3.	"Not That Different"	Karen Taylor-Good, Joie Scott	3:56
4.	"That's My Story"	Lee Roy Parnell, Tony Haselden	3:03
5.	"If I Were You"	John Hobbs, Chris Farren	4:06
6.	"One Boy, One Girl"	Mark Alan Springer, Shaye Smith	4:05
7.	"In This Life"	Mike Reid, Allen Shamblin	3:12
8.	"My Kind of Girl"	Debi Cochran, John Jarrard, Monty Powell	2:55
9.	"That Was a River"	Susan Longacre, Rick Giles	3:12
10.	"What the Heart Wants"	Michael Dulaney	3:44^{1}
11.	"The Gift" (featuring Jim Brickman and Susan Ashton)	Douglas, Jim Brickman	3:43^{1}
12.	"Open Arms"	Jonathan Cain, Steve Perry	3:21^{1}
13.	"Little Red Rodeo"	Charlie Black, Phil Vassar, Rory Bourke	3:23^{1}
14.	"Love, Me"	Skip Ewing, Max T. Barnes	3:51

- ^{1}Previously unreleased track.

== Production ==
- Jeff Teague – A&R executive
- John Hobbs – producer (1–4, 6–10, 14)
- Ed Seay – producer (1–6, 8, 10)
- Paul Worley – producer (1–6, 8–13)
- Garth Fundis – producer (7, 9)
- Collin Raye – producer (11–13)
- Billy Joe Walker Jr. – producer (11–13)
- Jerry Fuller – producer (14)
- Lauren Koch – production coordinator (10)
- Ginny Johnson – production coordinator (11–13)
- Bill Johnson – art direction
- Rollow Welch – art direction, design
- Randee St. Nicholas – front cover and tray card photography
- Caroline Greyshock – back cover photography, booklet photography
- Chris Carroll – booklet photography
- Bret Lopez – booklet photography
- Frank Ockenfels 3 – booklet photography
- Steve Cox for Scott Dean Management – management

Technical

- Denny Purcell – mastering at Georgetown Masters (Nashville, Tennessee)
- Jonathan Russell – mastering assistant
- Ed Seay – mixing (10–13), recording (10), track recording (11)
- Mike Poole – vocal recording (11)
- Brian Tankersley – overdub recording (11)
- Terry Christian – string engineer (11)
- Steve Tillisch – recording (12, 13)
- Dean Jamison – recording assistant (10), mix assistant (10, 11), tracking assistant (11)
- Anthony Martin – recording assistant (10), mix assistant (10)
- Scott Ahaus – vocal recording assistant (11)
- Brian Hardin – recording assistant (12, 13)
- Don Cobb – digital editing (12, 13)
- Carlos Grier – digital editing (12, 13)

== Personnel ==
The following musicians perform on tracks 10 through 13:

- Collin Raye – lead vocals
- John Hobbs – keyboards (10, 11)
- Jim Brickman – acoustic piano (11)
- Steve Nathan – acoustic piano (12, 13)
- Dann Huff – electric guitar (10, 11)
- Billy Joe Walker Jr. – acoustic guitar, electric guitar (12, 13)
- Biff Watson – acoustic guitar (10, 12, 13)
- Paul Worley – acoustic guitar (10)
- Larry Byrom – electric guitar (11–13)
- Steve Gibson – mandolin (10)
- Paul Franklin – dobro (10), steel guitar (10)
- Sonny Garrish – steel guitar (11–13)
- Joe Chemay – bass, backing vocals (10, 12, 13)
- Paul Leim – drums
- Will Smith – autoharp (10)
- Larry Franklin – fiddle (12, 13)
- The Nashville String Machine – strings (11)
- Ronn Huff – string arrangements (11)
- Carl Gorodetzky – string conductor (11)
- Anthony Martin – backing vocals (10)
- Gene Miller – backing vocals (10, 12, 13)
- John Wesley Ryles – backing vocals (10)
- Dennis Wilson – backing vocals (10, 12, 13)
- Susan Ashton – backing vocals (11)

== Charts ==
=== Weekly charts ===
Chart (1997)	Peak position
Canadian Albums (RPM)	70
Canadian Country Albums (RPM)	3
US Billboard 200	33
US Top Country Albums (Billboard)	4

=== Year-end charts ===
Chart (1997)	Position
US Top Country Albums (Billboard)	45
