= What If Jesus Comes Back Like That =

Single by Collin Raye

from the album I Think About You
- B-side: "The Time Machine"
- Released: November 1996
- Recorded: 1995
- Genre: Christian country
- Length: 3:07
- Label: Epic
- Songwriters: Pat Bunch, Doug Johnson
- Producers: Paul Worley, Ed Seay, John Hobbs

Collin Raye singles chronology
"Love Remains" (1996)	"What If Jesus Comes Back Like That" (1996)	"On the Verge" (1997)

"What If Jesus Comes Back Like That" is a song written by Pat Bunch and Doug Johnson, and recorded by American country music singer Collin Raye. It was released in November 1996 the fifth single from his album I Think About You.

== Content ==
The song is in E mixolydian (an E major scale with the seventh tone lowered by a half-step). Its main chord pattern is E-D/E-A/E. In the song, the narrator questions how people would react to Jesus returning in the modern day as a hobo or a child born of a drug-addicted parent.

== Critical reception ==
Deborah Evans Price of Billboard gave it a positive review, saying that it "may be his most risky venture yet... a great song, that deserves to be rewarded."

== Chart performance ==
The song entered the Hot Country Singles chart dated November 25, 1995, peaking at No. 57 on the December 16, 1995, chart. It spent 11 weeks on the chart in this timespan, receiving unsolicited airplay alongside Raye's then-current single "Not That Different". Upon its official release as a single, it re-entered in November 1996, reaching a new peak of No. 21 on the January 4, 1997, chart. Overall, it spent 22 weeks on the charts between its two runs.

Chart (1995)	Peak position
US Hot Country Songs (Billboard)	57
Chart (1996–1997)	Peak position
US Hot Country Songs (Billboard)	21
Canadian RPM Country Tracks	22

== Personnel ==
From I Think About You liner notes.

- Larry Byrom - electric guitar
- Joe Chemay - bass guitar
- Larry Franklin - fiddle
- Paul Franklin - steel guitar
- John Hobbs - piano, synthesizer, Hammond B-3 organ
- Dann Huff - electric guitar
- Paul Leim - drums
- Billy Joe Walker Jr. - acoustic guitar
- Biff Watson - acoustic guitar
- Dennis Wilson - background vocals
- Curtis Young - background vocals
