= Love Remains (song) =

Single by Collin Raye

from the album I Think About You
- B-side: "I Love Being Wrong"
- Released: June 1996
- Recorded: 1995
- Genre: Country
- Length: 3:48
- Label: Epic
- Songwriters: Tom Douglas; Jim Daddario
- Producers: John Hobbs; Ed Seay; Paul Worley

Collin Raye singles chronology
"I Think About You" (1996)	"Love Remains" (1996)	"What If Jesus Comes Back Like That" (1996)

"Love Remains" is a song written by Tom Douglas and Jim Daddario, and recorded by American country music artist Collin Raye. It was released in June 1996 as the fourth single from his album I Think About You. The song reached number 12 on the Billboard Hot Country Singles & Tracks chart in November 1996.

The song features several layered background vocals from bass guitarist Joe Chemay.

Adrienne Barbeau included a cover of the song on her self-titled 1998 album. The song was later covered by country music artist Hillary Scott, of the group Lady Antebellum, along with her family and appeared on Scott's 2016 Christian/Gospel album of the same title.

== Chart performance ==
Chart (1996)	Peak position
Canada Country Singles (RPM)	20
US Hot Country Songs (Billboard)	12

=== Year-end charts ===
Chart (1996)	Position
US Country Songs (Billboard)	67

Hillary Scott & the Scott Family version

Chart (2016)	Peak position
US Christian Songs (Billboard)	38

== Personnel ==
Personnel for Collin Raye version adapted from I Think About You liner notes.

- Larry Byrom - electric guitar
- Joe Chemay - bass guitar, background vocals
- Paul Franklin - steel guitar
- John Hobbs- piano, synthesizer, Hammond B-3 organ
- Paul Leim - drums
- Billy Joe Walker Jr. - acoustic guitar
- Biff Watson - acoustic guitar
