= On the Verge (song) =

Single by Collin Raye

from the album I Think About You
- Released: February 10, 1997
- Recorded: 1995–1996
- Genre: Country
- Length: 3:49
- Label: Epic
- Songwriter: Hugh Prestwood
- Producers: John Hobbs; Ed Seay; Paul Worley

Collin Raye singles chronology
"What If Jesus Comes Back Like That" (1996)	"On the Verge" (1997)	"What the Heart Wants" (1997)

"On the Verge" is a song written by Hugh Prestwood, and recorded by American country music artist Collin Raye. It was released in February 1997 as the sixth and final single from Raye's album I Think About You. The song reached #2 on the Billboard Hot Country Singles & Tracks chart in May 1997.

== Personnel ==
Credits are adapted from the liner notes of I Think About You.

- Larry Byrom – electric guitar
- Joe Chemay – bass guitar
- Paul Franklin – steel guitar
- John Hobbs – piano, synthesizer
- Paul Leim – drums
- Tom Roady – percussion
- Billy Joe Walker Jr. – electric guitar
- Biff Watson – acoustic guitar
- Dennis Wilson – background vocals
- Curtis Young – background vocals

== Chart performance ==
"On the Verge" debuted at number 44 on the U.S. Billboard Hot Country Singles & Tracks for the week of February 22, 1997.

Chart (1997)	Peak position
Canada Country Singles (RPM)	2
US Hot Country Songs (Billboard)	2

=== Year-end charts ===
Chart (1997)	Position
Canada Country Tracks (RPM)	16
US Country Songs (Billboard)	4
