= I Can Still Feel You =

Single by Collin Raye

from the album The Walls Came Down
- Released: April 13, 1998
- Genre: Country
- Length: 3:39
- Label: Epic
- Songwriters: Kim Tribble; Tammy Hyler
- Producers: Collin Raye; Billy Joe Walker Jr. Paul Worley

Collin Raye singles chronology
"Little Red Rodeo" (1997)	"I Can Still Feel You" (1998)	"Someone You Used to Know" (1998)

"I Can Still Feel You" is a song written by Kim Tribble and Tammy Hyler, and recorded by American country music singer Collin Raye that reached the top of the Billboard Hot Country Songs chart. It was released in April 1998 as the first single from his album The Walls Came Down.

== Background ==
"I Can Still Feel You" is in cut time and the key of E major. Raye's vocals range from E4 to B5.

== Critical reception ==
Chuck Taylor, of Billboard magazine reviewed the song favorably saying it boasts a "strong lyric, a memorable melody, and an outstanding vocal performance".

== Music video ==
The music video was directed by Steven Goldmann and premiered in early 1998. It was shot in black and white, and showed Raye with his leather jacket on as he walks across the streets singing the song. It also uses different lighting and moving effects throughout the video.

== Chart performance ==
This song debuted at number 52 on the U.S. Billboard Hot Country Singles & Tracks chart dated April 25, 1998. It spent 26 weeks on that chart, and peaked at number one on the chart dated July 18, 1998, where it remained for two weeks. The song was Raye's fourth and final number one on this chart, and his first since "My Kind of Girl" in 1995.

Chart (1998)	Peak position
Canada Country Singles (RPM)	2
US Hot Country Songs (Billboard)	1

=== Year-end charts ===
Chart (1998)	Position
Canada Country Tracks (RPM)	22
US Country Songs (Billboard)	8
