= I Think About You =

Studio album by Collin Raye
- Released: August 22, 1995
- Recorded: 1995
- Studio: The Music Mill, The Money Pit and JTM Recording (Nashville, Tennessee)
- Genre: Country
- Length: 39:24
- Label: Epic
- Producer: John Hobbs Ed Seay Paul Worley

Collin Raye chronology
Extremes (1994)	I Think About You (1995)	Christmas: The Gift (1996)

Singles from I Think About You
- 1. "One Boy, One Girl" Released: July 25, 1995; 2. "Not That Different" Released: November 14, 1995; 3. "I Think About You" Released: February 26, 1996; 4. "Love Remains" Released: June 1996; 5. "What If Jesus Comes Back Like That" Released: November 1996; 6. "On the Verge" Released: February 10, 1997

Professional ratings
Review scores
Source	Rating
Allmusic	link

I Think About You is the fourth studio album by American country music artist Collin Raye. Released in 1995 on Epic Records, I Think About You was also Raye's fourth consecutive album to receive a platinum certification by the RIAA. The album produced the singles "I Think About You", "Not That Different", "On the Verge", "One Boy, One Girl", "Love Remains" and "What If Jesus Comes Back Like That". These latter two tracks were the first two singles of Raye's career to miss the Top Ten on the Billboard country charts since his 1991 debut single, "All I Can Be (Is a Sweet Memory)".

== Track listing ==
No.	Title	Writer(s)	Length
1.	"I Think About You"	Don Schlitz, Steve Seskin	3:27
2.	"Not That Different"	Karen Taylor-Good, Joie Scott	3:56
3.	"On the Verge"	Hugh Prestwood	3:49
4.	"One Boy, One Girl"	Mark Alan Springer, Shaye Smith	4:03
5.	"Sweet Miss Behavin'"	Kostas, Wally Wilson	2:14
6.	"Heart Full of Rain"	Prestwood	3:53
7.	"What If Jesus Comes Back Like That"	Pat Bunch, Doug Johnson	3:07
8.	"The Time Machine"	Gary Burr	3:41
9.	"I Love Being Wrong"	Billy Kirsch, John Jarrard	4:17
10.	"I Volunteer"	Larry Boone, Will Robinson, Tammy Hyler	3:09
11.	"Love Remains"	Tom Douglas, Jim Daddario	3:48

== Personnel ==
Adapted from liner notes.

- Collin Raye – lead vocals
- John Hobbs – acoustic piano, Hammond B3 organ (1, 7, 11), synthesizers (2–4, 6, 7, 10, 11), accordion (6)
- Larry Byrom – electric guitar (1–3, 5–11)
- Billy Joe Walker Jr. – electric guitar (1, 3, 5, 9), acoustic guitar (2, 4, 6–8, 10, 11)
- Biff Watson – acoustic guitar
- Dann Huff – electric guitar (2, 4, 7, 10)
- Paul Franklin - steel guitar (1–8, 10, 11)
- Dan Dugmore – steel guitar (4, 9)
- Joe Chemay – bass, backing vocals (11)
- Ed Seay – 6-string bass (4)
- Paul Leim – drums (1–3, 5–8, 10, 11)
- Lonnie Wilson – drums (4, 9)
- Tom Roady – percussion (3, 8)
- Larry Franklin – fiddle (5, 7, 8)
- Dennis Wilson – backing vocals (1–10)
- Curtis Young – backing vocals (1–3, 5, 7, 8)
- John Wesley Ryles – backing vocals (4, 6, 9)
- Anthony Martin – backing vocals (10)

=== Production ===
- John Hobbs – producer
- Paul Worley – producer
- Ed Seay – producer, track recording, overdub recording, mixing
- Todd Culross – additional engineer
- Mike Poole – additional engineer
- Erik Hellerman – assistant engineer
- Anthony Martin – assistant engineer
- Jim Burnett – digital editing at The Money Pit
- Denny Purcell – mastering at Georgetown Masters (Nashville, Tennessee)
- Ginny Johnson – production coordinator
- Bill Johnson – art direction
- Rollow Weich – art direction
- Frank Ockenfels 3 – photography
- Steve Cox for Scott Dean Management – management

== Charts ==
=== Weekly charts ===
Chart (1995)	Peak position
Canadian Country Albums (RPM)	13
US Billboard 200	40
US Top Country Albums (Billboard)	5

=== Year-end charts ===
Chart (1995)	Position
US Top Country Albums (Billboard)	61
