= Start Over Georgia =

Single by Collin Raye

from the album The Walls Came Down
- Released: July 18, 1999
- Genre: Country
- Length: 3:06
- Label: Epic
- Songwriter(s): Collin Raye, Scott Wray
- Producer(s): Paul Worley, Billy Joe Walker Jr., Collin Raye

Collin Raye singles chronology
"Anyone Else" (1999)	"Start Over Georgia" (1999)	"Couldn't Last a Moment" (2000)

"Start Over Georgia" is a song co-written and recorded by American country music artist Collin Raye. It was released in July 1999 as the fourth single from the album The Walls Came Down. The song reached #39 on the Billboard Hot Country Singles & Tracks chart. The song was written by Raye and his brother, Scott Wray.

== Chart performance ==
Chart (1999)	Peak position
US Hot Country Songs (Billboard)	39
Canadian RPM Country Tracks	42
