= Counting Sheep (album) =

Studio album by Collin Raye
- Released: January 25, 2000
- Studio: The Tracking Room, Emerald Sound Studios and Studio Six (Nashville, Tennessee); Sony Music Studios (Santa Monica, California)
- Genre: Children's music; country
- Length: 31:10
- Label: Sony
- Producer: John Hobbs

Collin Raye chronology
The Walls Came Down (1998)	Counting Sheep (2000)	Tracks (2000)

Counting Sheep is an album of children's music, released in 2000, by American country music artist Collin Raye. It did not produce any chart singles, and was intended as a side project.

== Track listing ==
No.	Title	Writer(s)	Length
1.	"Counting Sheep"	Robert Ellis Orrall	2:58
2.	"I'm Gonna Love You"	Orrall	3:26
3.	"Blackbird"	John Lennon; Paul McCartney	2:30
4.	"A Mother and Father's Prayer" (with Melissa Manchester)	Manchester; Karen Taylor-Good	3:35
5.	"When You Wish Upon a Star"	Leigh Harline; Ned Washington	2:46
6.	"Cool Cat"	John Hobbs; Collin Raye	2:28
7.	"Too Ra Loo Ra Loo Ral (An Irish Lullaby)"	James Royce Shannon	2:50
8.	"Hearts Are For When You Want to Love Someone"	K. L. Gordon; L. Paxton	2:20
9.	"The Dream Son"	Taylor-Good; Jason Blume	3:27
10.	"When You Say Your Prayers"	Taylor-Good; Blume	3:12
11.	"Stay Awake"	Robert B. Sherman; Richard M. Sherman	1:38
Total length:			31:10

- All track information was taken from the CD liner notes.

== Personnel ==
- Collin Raye – vocals
- John Hobbs – acoustic piano, keyboards (3, 4), Hammond B3 organ (3, 4), synthesizers (11)
- Steve Nathan – acoustic piano (1, 2, 5, 9, 10), keyboards (1, 2, 5–10), organ (1, 2, 5–10)
- Jim Cox – keyboards (3, 4), organ (3, 4)
- Steve Gibson – electric guitars (1, 2, 5, 9, 10), mandolin (1, 2, 5, 9, 10)
- Tom Hemby – acoustic guitars (1, 2, 5, 9, 10)
- John Jorgenson – electric guitars (3, 4, 6–8), acoustic guitars (6–8), mandolin (6–8), ukulele (6–8), dulcimer (6–8), clarinet (6–8), tin whistle (6–8)
- Dean Parks – acoustic guitars (3, 4)
- Biff Watson – acoustic guitars (6–8)
- Joe Chemay – bass (1, 2, 5, 7–10), backing vocals
- Leland Sklar – bass (3, 4)
- Larry Paxton – upright bass (6)
- Paul Leim – drums (1, 2, 5–10), percussion (1, 2, 5–10)
- John Robinson – drums (3, 4)
- Wes Hightower – backing vocals
- Liana Manis – backing vocals
- Dennis Wilson – backing vocals
- Melissa Manchester – vocals (4)

=== Production ===
- John Hobbs – producer
- Ben Fowler – recording (1–5, 9, 10), mixing (1–5, 9, 10), overdub recording (3, 4)
- Ed Seay – recording (6–8, 11), mixing (6–8, 11), overdub recording (6–8, 11)
- Jason Penske – tracking assistant (1, 2, 5), overdub assistant (1, 2, 5)
- Allen Ditto – mix assistant (1–5, 9, 10), overdub assistant (3, 4)
- Jennifer Knott – recording assistant (3, 4)
- John Saylor – recording assistant (6–8, 11), mix assistant (6–8, 11)
- Eric Conn – digital editing
- Carlos Grier – digital editing
- Denny Purcell – mastering at Georgetown Masters (Nashville, Tennessee)
- Jonathan Russell – mastering assistant
- Kimberly Bianco – production coordinator
- Hillary Bratton – A&R manager
- Mary Kramer – art direction
