= All I Can Be =

Studio album by Collin Raye
- Released: August 27, 1991
- Recorded: 1991
- Studio: The Bennett House (Franklin, Tennessee); Footprint Sound Studio (Sherman Oaks, California)
- Genre: Country
- Length: 33:28
- Label: Epic
- Producer: Jerry Fuller; John Hobbs

Collin Raye chronology
All I Can Be (1991)	In This Life (1992)

Singles from All I Can Be
- 1. "All I Can Be (Is a Sweet Memory)" Released: June 8, 1991; 2. "Love, Me" Released: October 1991; 3. "Every Second" Released: February 25, 1992

Professional ratings
Review scores
Source	Rating
AllMusic	2/5 stars

All I Can Be is the debut studio album by American country music artist Collin Raye. It features the hit singles "All I Can Be (Is a Sweet Memory)" (originally recorded by Conway Twitty as "All I Can Be Is a Sweet Memory" on his 1985 album Chasin' Rainbows), "Love, Me" (Raye's first No. 1 on the Billboard country charts), and "Every Second". "Any Ole Stretch of Blacktop" was later recorded by Shenandoah as a new track for their 1992 Greatest Hits album.

The song "If I Were You" is not to be confused with another song with the same name which Raye recorded on his 1994 album, Extremes. This song, written by Chris Farren and John Hobbs, was released by Raye as the latter album's fifth single, in 1995.

== Track listing ==
No.	Title	Writer(s)	Length
1.	"All I Can Be (Is a Sweet Memory)"	Harlan Howard	3:09
2.	"Every Second"	Gerald Smith, Wayne Perry	2:25
3.	"Faithful Old Flame"	Brent Mason, Lonnie Wilson	3:23
4.	"'Scuse Moi, My Heart"	Steve Stone, Jerry Fuller	3:30
5.	"Any Old Stretch of Blacktop"	Frank J. Myers, Bernie Nelson	3:37
6.	"Love, Me"	Skip Ewing, Max T. Barnes	3:52
7.	"Blue Magic"	Collin Raye, John Hobbs, Fuller	3:02
8.	"It Could've Been So Good"	Chris Waters, Wilson	4:21
9.	"Sadly Ever After"	Mark Collie, Bruce Burch	3:03
10.	"If I Were You"	Richard Fagan, Rick Peoples	2:51

== Personnel ==
Adapted from liner notes.

- Collin Raye – vocals
- John Hobbs – keyboards
- Steve Gibson – acoustic guitar, electric guitar
- Kraig Hutchens – electric guitar
- Dean Parks – acoustic guitar, electric guitar
- Fred Tackett – acoustic guitar
- Billy Joe Walker Jr. – acoustic guitar, electric guitar
- Reggie Young – electric guitar
- Paul Franklin – steel guitar
- Jay Dee Maness – steel guitar
- Dennis Belfield – bass
- Joe Chemay – bass
- Ron Krasinski – drums
- Paul Leim – drums
- Rob Hajacos – fiddle
- Vince Gill – backing vocals (1)
- Beth Anderson – backing vocals
- Jerry Fuller – backing vocals
- Herb Pederson – backing vocals (5, 10)
- Harry Stinson – backing vocals
- Dennis Wilson – backing vocals
- Bubba Wray – backing vocals

== Production ==
- Jerry Fuller – producer
- John Hobbs – producer
- Gene Eichelberger – engineer
- Brian Friedman – engineer
- Wally Traugott – mastering at Capitol Mastering (Hollywood, California)
- Annette Fuller – production assistant
- Bill Johnson – art direction
- Jodi Lynn Miller – design
- Chris Carroll – photography
- Scott Dean Management – management

== Chart performance ==
Chart (1991)	Peak position
U.S. Billboard 200	54
U.S. Billboard Top Country Albums	7
U.S. Billboard Top Heatseekers	5
