= One Boy, One Girl =

Single by Collin Raye

from the album I Think About You
- B-side: "I Love Being Wrong"
- Released: July 25, 1995
- Recorded: 1995
- Genre: Country
- Length: 4:03
- Label: Epic
- Songwriters: Mark Alan Springer; Shaye Smith
- Producers: John Hobbs; Ed Seay; Paul Worley

Collin Raye singles chronology
"If I Were You" (1995)	"One Boy, One Girl" (1995)	"Not That Different" (1995)

"One Boy, One Girl" is a song written by Mark Alan Springer and Shaye Smith, and recorded by American country music singer Collin Raye. It was released in July 1995 as the first single from his album, I Think About You. It peaked at #2 in the United States and #4 in Canada. It also peaked at #87 on the Billboard Hot 100.

== Content ==
The song's narrator talks about the virtues of one boy, and one girl...from their meeting and courtship, then their marriage, then their birth of their twins (which just so happen to be one boy and one girl). The video shows Raye at a campfire with the parents and their twins and a few others.

== Music video ==
The music video for the song consisted of Collin Raye singing the song to a group of people around the campfire at night.

== Chart positions ==
Chart (1995)	Peak position
Canada Country Singles (RPM)	4
US Billboard Hot 100	87
US Hot Country Songs (Billboard)	2

=== Year-end charts ===
Chart (1995)	Position
Canada Country Tracks (RPM)	95
US Country Songs (Billboard)	16

== Personnel ==
From I Think About You liner notes.

- Joe Chemay - bass guitar
- Dan Dugmore - steel guitar
- Paul Franklin - steel guitar
- John Hobbs - piano, synthesizer
- Dann Huff - electric guitar
- John Wesley Ryles - background vocals
- Ed Seay - six-string bass guitar
- Billy Joe Walker Jr. - acoustic guitar
- Biff Watson - acoustic guitar
- Dennis Wilson - background vocals
- Lonnie Wilson - drums
