= Someone You Used to Know =

Single by Collin Raye

from the album The Walls Came Down
- B-side: "Make Sure You've Got It All"
- Released: August 17, 1998
- Genre: Country
- Length: 3:45
- Label: Epic
- Songwriters: Tim Johnson; Rory Feek
- Producers: Paul Worley; Collin Raye; Billy Joe Walker Jr.

Collin Raye singles chronology
"I Can Still Feel You" (1998)	"Someone You Used to Know" (1998)	"Anyone Else" (1999)

"Someone You Used to Know" is a song written by Tim Johnson and Rory Feek, and recorded by American country music singer Collin Raye. It was released in August 1998 as the second single from his CD The Walls Came Down. The song peaked at #3 on the U.S. Billboard country music charts and #5 on the Canadian RPM Country Tracks. It also peaked at #37 on the Billboard Hot 100 becoming Raye's biggest crossover hit.

== Chart performance ==
The song debuted at number 65 on the Billboard Hot Country Singles & Tracks chart dated August 22, 1998.

Chart (1998–1999)	Peak position
Canada Country Singles (RPM)	5
US Billboard Hot 100	37
US Hot Country Songs (Billboard)	3

=== Year-end charts ===
Chart (1999)	Position
Canada Country Tracks (RPM)	99
US Country Songs (Billboard)	71
