= Anyone Else (Collin Raye song) =

Single by Collin Raye

from the album The Walls Came Down
- Released: January 25, 1999
- Genre: Country
- Length: 3:47
- Label: Epic
- Songwriter: Radney Foster
- Producers: Collin Raye; Billy Joe Walker Jr. Paul Worley

Collin Raye singles chronology
"Someone You Used to Know" (1998)	"Anyone Else" (1999)	"Start Over Georgia" (1999)

"Anyone Else" is a song written by Radney Foster, and recorded by American country music artist Collin Raye. It was released in January 1999 as the third and final single from Raye's 1998 album The Walls Came Down. The song reached No. 4 on the Billboard Hot Country Singles & Tracks chart in May 1999 and No. 1 on the RPM Country Tracks chart in Canada.

== Chart performance ==
"Anyone Else" debuted at number 66 on the U.S. Billboard Hot Country Singles & Tracks for the week of January 30, 1999.

Chart (1999)	Peak position
Canada Country Singles (RPM)	1
US Billboard Hot 100	37
US Hot Country Songs (Billboard)	4

=== Year-end charts ===
Chart (1999)	Position
Canada Country Tracks (RPM)	17
US Country Songs (Billboard)	27
