= I Think About You (song) =

Single by Collin Raye

from the album I Think About You
- B-side: "I Volunteer"
- Released: February 26, 1996
- Recorded: 1995
- Genre: Country
- Length: 3:27
- Label: Epic
- Songwriters: Don Schlitz, Steve Seskin
- Producers: John Hobbs; Ed Seay; Paul Worley

Collin Raye singles chronology
"Not That Different" (1995)	"I Think About You" (1996)	"Love Remains" (1996)

"I Think About You" is a song written by Steve Seskin and Don Schlitz, and recorded by American country music singer Collin Raye. It was released in February 1996 as the third single and title track from his album of the same name. It peaked at number 3 in the United States and number 2 in Canada.

== Content ==
The song is an uptempo, with an underlying message about a man who is reminded of his daughter in the image of every woman he sees.

== Music video ==
The music video for the song consisted of Raye portraying a police officer in a reenactment of the TV series Cops. Raye's daughter Brittany, then 13 years old, appears in the video.

== Critical reception ==
Deborah Evans Price, of Billboard magazine reviewed the song favorably, saying that with Raye's "great voice and honest, heartfeld delivery" the song is a winner.

== Chart positions ==
"I Think About You" debuted at number 67 on the U.S. Billboard Hot Country Singles & Tracks for the week of March 9, 1996.

Chart (1996)	Peak position
Canada Country Singles (RPM)	2
US Hot Country Songs (Billboard)	3

=== Year-end charts ===
Chart (1996)	Position
Canada Country Tracks (RPM)	58
US Country Songs (Billboard)	15

== Personnel ==
From I Think About You liner notes.

- Larry Byrom - electric guitar
- Joe Chemay - bass guitar
- Paul Franklin - steel guitar
- John Hobbs - piano, Hammond B-3 organ
- Paul Leim - drums
- Billy Joe Walker Jr. - electric guitar
- Biff Watson - acoustic guitar
- Dennis Wilson - background vocals
- Curtis Young - background vocals
