= Tracks (Collin Raye album) =

Studio album by Collin Raye
- Released: May 2, 2000
- Studio: Emerald Entertainment, Seventeen Grand Recording, Ocean Way Nashville, Sound Stage Studios and The Money Pit (Nashville, Tennessee); Sound Kitchen (Franklin, Tennessee)
- Genre: Country
- Length: 46:43
- Label: Epic
- Producer: Dann Huff Collin Raye Paul Worley

Collin Raye chronology
| Counting Sheep (2000) | Tracks (2000) | Can't Back Down (2001) |

Singles from Tracks
- 1. "Couldn't Last a Moment" Released: February 1, 2000

Professional ratings
Review scores
| Source | Rating |
|---|---|
| Allmusic | 3/5 stars |

Tracks is the sixth studio album by American country music artist Collin Raye. It contains the singles "Couldn't Last a Moment", "Loving This Way" (also known as "Tired of Loving This Way"), and "You Still Take Me There". "Couldn't Last a Moment" was Raye's final Top 40 hit on the Billboard country charts at number 3, while the other two singles both failed to reach Top 40. Two of this album's tracks were later recorded by Kenny Rogers: "Harder Cards" on his 2003 album Back to the Well, and "Water and Bridges" on his 2006 album of the same name.

== Track listing ==
| No. | Title | Writer(s) | Length |
|---|---|---|---|
| 1. | "She's All That" | Collin Raye, Scott Wray | 3:27 |
| 2. | "I Want to Be There" | Tommy Lee James, Robert Hart, Stephony Smith | 3:52 |
| 3. | "Completely" | Marc Beeson, Jeff Wood | 3:51 |
| 4. | "Couldn't Last a Moment" | Danny Wells, Jeffrey Steele | 3:41 |
| 5. | "You Will Always Be Mine" | Bob Regan, Chris Lindsey | 5:00 |
| 6. | "A Long Way to Go" | Richard Fagan, Gordon Kennedy | 3:40 |
| 7. | "Harder Cards" | Craig Wiseman, Mike Henderson | 3:54 |
| 8. | "Landing in Love" | Chuck Jones, Chuck Cannon | 3:54 |
| 9. | "Loving This Way" (duet with Bobbie Eakes) | Allison Mellon, Gene LeSage | 3:29 |
| 10. | "You Still Take Me There" | Del Gray, Brett James, Thom McHugh | 3:42 |
| 11. | "Water and Bridges" | Tim Nichols, Wiseman | 3:31 |
| 12. | "She's Gonna Fly" | Jason Blume, Karen Taylor-Good | 4:42 |

== Personnel ==
Compiled from liner notes.

Musicians

- Collin Raye – vocals
- John Hobbs – keyboards
- Steve Nathan – keyboards
- Tim Akers – keyboards (1–6, 8–10, 12)
- Matt Rollings – keyboards (1–6, 8–10, 12)
- Dann Huff – electric guitars (1–6, 8–10, 12)
- Gordon Kennedy – electric guitars (1–6, 8–10, 12)
- Jeff King – electric guitars (1–6, 8–10, 12)
- B. James Lowry – acoustic guitars (1–6, 8–10, 12)
- Biff Watson – acoustic guitars
- Brent Mason – electric guitars (7, 11)
- Paul Franklin – steel guitar (1–6, 8–10, 12)
- Mike Brignardello – bass (1–6, 8–10, 12)
- Joe Chemay – bass
- Paul Leim – drums
- Lonnie Wilson – drums (1–6, 8–10, 12)
- Eric Darken – percussion (1–6, 8–10, 12)
- Aubrey Haynie – fiddle, mandolin (7, 11)
- Nashville String Machine – strings (3, 12)
- Ronn Huff – string arrangements (3, 12)
- Gene Miller – backing vocals (1–6, 8–10, 12)
- Chris Rodriguez – backing vocals (1–6, 8–10, 12)
- Russell Terrell – backing vocals (1–6, 8–10, 12)
- Wes Hightower – backing vocals (7, 11)
- Troy Johnson – backing vocals (7, 11)
- Bobbie Eakes – vocals (9)

Production

- Laura Putty – A&R direction
- Collin Raye – producer
- Dann Huff – producer (1–6, 8–10, 12)
- Paul Worley – producer (7, 11)
- Jeff Balding – recording (1–6, 8–10, 12), mixing (1–6, 8–10, 12)
- Clarke Schleicher – recording (7, 11), mixing (7, 11)
- John Guess – recording (9)
- Jake Niceley – recording (9)
- Eric Bickel – recording assistant (1–6, 8, 10, 12)
- David Bryant – recording assistant (1–6, 8, 10, 12)
- Mark Hagen – recording assistant (1–6, 8–10, 12), additional recording (1–6, 8, 10, 12)
- Jed Hackett – recording assistant (1–6, 8, 10, 12)
- Melissa Mattey – recording assistant (1–6, 8, 10, 12)
- Matt "Mat5t" Weeks – recording assistant (1–6, 8, 10, 12)
- Chad Brown – mix assistant (1–6, 8–10, 12)
- Erik Hellerman – recording assistant (7, 11)
- Mike Poole – additional recording (7, 11)
- Sandy Jenkins – additional recording assistant (7, 11)
- Chris Scherbak – additional recording assistant (7, 11)
- Jason Sheesley – additional recording assistant (7, 11)
- Patrick Murphy – recording assistant (9)
- Shawn Simpson – digital editing (1–6, 8–10, 12)
- Doug Sax – mastering at The Mastering Lab (Hollywood, California)
- Tanya Darry – A&R coordinator
- Kay Smith – A&R coordinator
- Mike "Frog" Griffith – production coordinator (1–6, 8–10)
- Paige Connors – production coordinator (7, 11)
- Deb Boyle – production coordinator (9)
- Bill Johnson – art direction
- Beth Kindig – art direction
- Tony Baker – photography, digital assemblage
- Steve Cox for Scott Dean Management – management

== Chart performance ==
| Chart (2000) | Peak position |
|---|---|
| U.S. Billboard Top Country Albums | 9 |
| U.S. Billboard 200 | 81 |
| Canadian RPM Country Albums | 8 |
