= Can't Back Down =

Studio album by Collin Raye
- Released: October 30, 2001
- Studios: Ocean Way Nashville, Loud Recording Studio and Emerald Sound Studios (Nashville, Tennessee); O'Henry Sound Studios (Burbank, California)
- Genre: Country
- Length: 46:13
- Label: Epic
- Producers: Collin Raye James Stroud

Collin Raye chronology
Tracks (2000)	Can't Back Down (2001)	Twenty Years and Change (2005)

Professional ratings
Review scores
Source	Rating
Allmusic	3/5 stars

Can't Back Down is the seventh studio album released by country music artist Collin Raye. It was also his last album for Epic Records, and the first album of his career not to produce any Top 40 country hits. "Ain't Nobody Gonna Take That from Me", the first single, reached #43 on the Hot Country Songs charts. "What I Need", the second single, failed to chart.

== Critical reception ==
Maria Konicki Dinoia of Allmusic rated the album three stars out of five. She considered it "in much the same vein" as his previous albums, saying that "fans will come to love and appreciate" it.

== Track listing ==
1. "Gypsy Honeymoon" (Kim Carnes, Collin Ellingson) – 3:49
2. "It Could Be That Easy" (Tom Damphier, Gene LeSage) – 3:27
3. "Ain't Nobody Gonna Take That from Me" (Rivers Rutherford, Annie Tate, Sam Tate) – 4:13
4. "What I Need" (Karen Taylor-Good, Jason Blume) – 3:34
5. "Dancing with No Music Playing" (Don Ellis, Billy Montana) – 3:51
6. "You Always Get to Me" (Angela Lauer, Tom Douglas) – 4:13
7. "End of the World" (Billy Mann) – 3:40
8. "One Desire" (Jane Bach, Tammy Hyler, Kevin Haynie) – 5:12
9. "Young as We're Ever Gonna Be" (Collin Raye, Scott Wray) – 3:49
10. "Dear Life" (Christi Dannemiller, LeSage) – 4:34
11. "What I Did for Love" (Brent Maher, Thom Schuyler) – 3:09
12. "I Can Let Go Now" (Michael McDonald) – 2:42

== Personnel ==
As listed in liner notes.

- Collin Raye – lead vocals
- Steve Nathan – acoustic piano, keyboards
- Gary Prim – acoustic piano, keyboards
- Matt Rollings – acoustic piano, keyboards
- B. James Lowry – acoustic guitars
- Brent Mason – electric guitars
- Brent Rowan – electric guitars
- Biff Watson – acoustic guitars
- Paul Franklin – steel guitar
- Sonny Garrish – steel guitar
- Stuart Duncan – mandolin, fiddle
- Aubrey Haynie – mandolin, fiddle
- Mike Brignardello – bass
- David Hungate – bass
- Eddie Bayers – drums
- Steve Dorff – string arrangements and conductor (12)
- Kim Carnes – backing vocals
- Billy Davis – backing vocals
- Chip Davis – backing vocals
- Wes Hightower – backing vocals
- Little Big Town – backing vocals
- John Wesley Ryles – backing vocals
- Jeffrey Steele – backing vocals
- Russell Terrell – backing vocals

=== Production ===
- Laura Putty – A&R direction
- Collin Raye – producer
- James Stroud – producer
- Julian King – recording, mixing
- David Bryant – recording assistant, mix assistant
- Jake Burns – recording assistant, mix assistant
- Ricky Cobble – recording assistant, mix assistant
- Jed Hackett – recording assistant, mix assistant
- Rich Hanson – recording assistant, mix assistant
- John Guess – additional recording
- Patrick Murphy – additional recording assistant
- Eric Conn – digital editing
- Carlos Grier – digital editing
- Denny Purcell – mastering at Georgetown Masters (Nashville, Tennessee)
- Tammy Luker – production coordinator
- Doug Rich – production coordinator
- Michael Hatt – A&R coordinator
- Kay Smith – A&R coordinator
- Bill Johnson – art direction
- Beth Kindig – art direction
- Matthew Barnes – photography
- Renee Fowler – stylist
- Mary Elizabeth Long – grooming
- Scott Dean Management – management

== Chart performance ==
Chart (2002)	Peak position
U.S. Billboard Top Country Albums	39
