= The Walls Came Down =

Studio album by Collin Raye
- Released: July 14, 1998
- Studio: The Money Pit, Seventeen Grand Recording, Woodland Digital, East Iris Studios, Love Shack Studios, Masterfonics, Sound Stage Studios, Westwood Sound Studios and Starstruck Studios (Nashville, Tennessee); O'Henry Sound Studios (Burbank, California)
- Genre: Country
- Length: 45:36
- Label: Epic
- Producer: John Hobbs Collin Raye Ed Seay Billy Joe Walker Jr. Paul Worley

Collin Raye chronology
| The Best of Collin Raye: Direct Hits (1997) | The Walls Came Down (1998) | Counting Sheep (2000) |

Singles from The Walls Came Down
- 1. "I Can Still Feel You" Released: April 13, 1998; 2. "Someone You Used to Know" Released: August 17, 1998; 3. "Anyone Else" Released: January 25, 1999; 4. "Start Over Georgia" Released: July 18, 1999

Professional ratings
Review scores
| Source | Rating |
|---|---|
| Allmusic | 3/5 stars |

The Walls Came Down is the fifth studio album by American country music artist Collin Raye. The album's lead-off single, "I Can Still Feel You", was Raye's fourth and final Number One on the Billboard country charts. Other singles from this album were the Top Five hits "Someone You used to Know" and "Anyone Else", as well as the number 39-peaking "Start Over Georgia", which he co-wrote with his brother Scotty Wray. Although not released as a single, the track "The Eleventh Commandment" was made into a music video, which aired on CMT and TNN (now Spike TV). "Make Sure You've Got It All" was later recorded by Diamond Rio on their 2002 album Completely.

Raye co-produced the album with Paul Worley and Billy Joe Walker, Jr., except for "April Fool", which Worley produced with Ed Seay and John Hobbs.

== Track listing ==
| No. | Title | Writer(s) | Length |
|---|---|---|---|
| 1. | "Anyone Else" | Radney Foster | 3:47 |
| 2. | "I Wish I Could" | Tom Douglas, Randy Thomas | 3:46 |
| 3. | "Start Over Georgia" | Collin Raye, Scott Wray | 3:06 |
| 4. | "I Can Still Feel You" | Kim Tribble, Tammy Hyler | 3:39 |
| 5. | "Someone You Used to Know" | Tim Johnson, Rory Feek | 3:45 |
| 6. | "Corner of the Heart" | Hugh Prestwood | 3:22 |
| 7. | "All My Roads" | Karen Taylor-Good, Annette Cotter | 3:38 |
| 8. | "The Walls Came Down" | Raye | 3:41 |
| 9. | "April Fool" | Prestwood | 3:21 |
| 10. | "Make Sure You've Got It All" | Bill Anderson, Steve Wariner | 4:12 |
| 11. | "Survivors" | Wray, Jim Daddario | 3:22 |
| 12. | "Dark Secrets" (instrumental) | Larry Cansler | 1:50 |
| 13. | "The Eleventh Commandment" | Taylor-Good, Lisa Aschmann | 3:59 |

== Personnel ==
As listed in liner notes.

- Collin Raye – lead vocals, backing vocals
- Jon Carroll – acoustic piano, Wurlitzer electric piano
- John Hobbs – acoustic piano
- Steve Nathan – acoustic piano, synthesizers, Hammond B3 organ
- Michael Omartian – acoustic piano
- Matt Rollings – acoustic piano
- Randy Waldman – acoustic piano, toy piano
- Dann Huff – electric guitar
- Brent Mason – electric guitar
- Brent Rowan – electric guitar
- Billy Joe Walker Jr. – acoustic guitar, Baby Taylor guitar, electric guitar
- Biff Watson – acoustic guitar
- Paul Worley – acoustic guitar, 12-string guitar
- Paul Franklin – steel guitar
- Sonny Garrish – steel guitar
- Stuart Duncan – mandolin, fiddle
- Aubrey Haynie – mandolin, fiddle
- Joe Chemay – bass
- Michael Rhodes – bass
- Eddie Bayers – drums, percussion
- Paul Leim – drums
- Terry McMillan – percussion, shaker
- Will Smith – autoharp
- Jenna Cowart – backing vocals
- Wes Hightower – backing vocals
- Gene Miller – backing vocals
- John Wesley Ryles – backing vocals
- Dennis Wilson – backing vocals
- Curtis Young – backing vocals

String section on "The Eleventh Commandment"

- Larry Cansler – string arrangements
- Murray Adler – conductor
- Glenn Grab, Suzie Katayama, Ray Kelley and Jerry Kessler – cello
- Jim Hughart and Frances Liu – upright bass
- Mimi Granat, Jorge Moraga, Carol Mukagawa and Harry Shirinian – viola
- Murray Adler, Joel Derouin, Juliann French, Eric Gorfain, Endre Granat, Gina Kronstadt, Bob Peterson and Bob Sanov – violin

== Production ==
- Ed Seay – engineer, mixing
- Dean Jamison – assistant engineer
- Jeff Balding – recording
- Steve Tillisch – recording, additional recording
- Amy Frigo – recording assistant
- Mark Hagen – recording assistant, additional recording
- Erik Hellerman – recording assistant
- Charlie Brocco – additional recording
- Rodney Good – additional recording
- John Hurley – additional recording
- Jake Niceley – additional recording
- Clarke Schleicher – additional recording
- Billy Sherrill – additional recording
- Ed Simonton – additional recording
- Brett Swain – string recording (13)
- Jeff Shannon – string recording assistant (13)
- Kevin Beamish – mixing, digital editing
- Derek Bason – mix assistant, digital editing
- Jim Burnett – digital editing
- Don Cobb – digital editing
- Carlos Grier – digital editing
- Giles Reaves – digital editing
- Denny Purcell – mastering
- Jonathan Russell – mastering assistant
- Georgetown Masters (Nashville, Tennessee) – editing and mastering location
- Deb Boyle – production coordinator
- Tracy Baskette – art direction
- Bill Johnson – art direction
- Randee St. Nicholas – photography
- Eric Barnard – grooming
- Steve Cox for Scott Dean Management – management

== Charts ==
=== Weekly charts ===
| Chart (1998) | Peak position |
|---|---|
| Canadian Country Albums (RPM) | 13 |
| US Billboard 200 | 55 |
| US Top Country Albums (Billboard) | 8 |

=== Year-end charts ===
| Chart (1998) | Position |
|---|---|
| US Top Country Albums (Billboard) | 54 |
