= The Wrays =

American country music group

- Also known as: The Wray Brothers Band
- Origin: Texas, USA
- Genres: Country
- Years active: 1981–1987
- Labels: CIS, Sasparilla, Mercury Records
- Past members: Bubba Wray; Scotty Wray; Jim Covert; Lin Phillips; Joe Dale Cleghorn

The Wrays, also known as The Wray Brothers Band, were an American country music group from Texas composed of Bubba Wray, Scotty Wray, Jim Covert, Lin Phillips and Joe Dale Cleghorn. Following several independent singles, The Wrays released three singles on Mercury Records in the 1980s. Their highest-charting single, "You Lay a Lotta Love on Me", reached the Top 50 on the Billboard Hot Country Singles chart in 1987. After The Wrays broke up, lead singer Bubba Wray launched a successful solo career as Collin Raye.

== Singles ==
| Year | Single | US Country |
|---|---|---|
| 1982 | "Cowboy Sangers"^{A} | – |
| 1983 | "Reason to Believe"^{A} | 88 |
| 1984 | "The Battle of New Orleans"^{A} | – |
| 1984 | "I Need Someone Bad Tonight"^{A} | – |
| 1985 | "Until We Meet Again"^{A} | 93 |
| 1986 | "I Don't Want to Know Your Name" | 71 |
| 1986 | "Come on Joe" | – |
| 1987 | "You Lay a Lotta Love on Me" | 48 |
"—" denotes releases that did not chart

- ^{A}Credited to The Wray Brothers Band.
