= I Want You Bad (And That Ain't Good) =

Single by Collin Raye

from the album In This Life
- B-side: "Let It Be Me"
- Released: November 30, 1992
- Studio: Sound Emporium (Nashville, Tennessee)
- Genre: Country
- Length: 2:32
- Label: Epic
- Songwriter: Jackson Leap
- Producers: Garth Fundis, John Hobbs

Collin Raye singles chronology
"In This Life" (1992)	"I Want You Bad (And That Ain't Good)" (1992)	"Somebody Else's Moon" (1993)

"I Want You Bad (And That Ain't Good)" is a song written by Jackson Leap, and recorded by American country music singer Collin Raye. The song reached the Top Ten on the Billboard Hot Country Singles & Tracks chart. It was released in November 1992 as the second single from his CD In This Life.

== Chart performance ==
The song debuted at number 64 on the Hot Country Singles & Tracks chart dated December 5, 1992. It charted for 20 weeks on that chart, and peaked at number 7 on the country chart dated March 13, 1993.

=== Charts ===
Chart (1992–1993)	Peak position
Canada Country Singles (RPM)	14
US Hot Country Songs (Billboard)	7

=== Year-end charts ===
Chart (1993)	Position
US Country Songs (Billboard)	70
