= Never Going Back =

Studio album by Collin Raye
- Released: April 28, 2009
- Studio: First Avenue Sound (Franklin, Tennessee); Ryman Auditorium, Major Mac Studios and Noise Block Studios (Nashville, Tennessee)
- Genre: CCM, Country
- Length: 38:31
- Label: Time–Life
- Producer: Michael A. Curtis

Collin Raye chronology
Selected Hits (2007)	Never Going Back (2009)	His Love Remains (2011)

Never Going Back is the tenth studio album from Country singer Collin Raye. The album was released on April 28, 2009 through Time Life Entertainment.

== Track listing ==
1. "Get Up in Jesus' Name" (Mike Curtis, Marty Raybon) - 3:41
2. "The Only Jesus" (Curtis, Collin Raye) - 3:20
3. "Mid-Life Chrysler" (Tony Martin, Wendell Mobley, Neil Thrasher) - 3:46
4. "You Get Me" (Mobley, Thrasher) - 3:29
5. "Never Going Back" (Curtis, Troy Powers, C. Raye, Brittany Raye) - 4:58
6. "Take Care of You" (Aimee Mayo, Mobley, Thrasher) - 3:45
7. "The Cross" (Curtis) - 3:25
8. "She's with Me" (C. Raye) - 4:11
9. "I Love You This Much" (Austin Cunningham, Thrasher) - 3:43
10. "Indescribable" (Laura Story) - 4:13

== Personnel ==
- Collin Raye – vocals, backing vocals
- John Hobbs – keyboards, Hammond B3 organ
- James Mitchell – electric guitars
- Michael Spriggs – acoustic guitars, gut-string guitar
- Scotty Sanders – steel guitar
- Gary Lunn – bass
- Bob Wray – bass
- Mark Beckett – drums, percussion
- Doug Stokes – drums, percussion
- Jim Gray – string arrangements and conductor
- Christopher Mangum – music preparation
- Anthony LaMarchina – cello
- Julie Tanner – cello
- Joel Reist – double bass
- Jim Grosjean – viola
- Alan Umstead – viola, violin
- Don Clive Davidson – violin
- Conni Ellisor – violin
- Pamela Sixfin – violin, string contractor
- Michael A. Curtis – backing vocals
- Lenny LeBlanc – backing vocals
- Mike Pyle – backing vocals
- Susan Ashton – vocals (4)

=== Production ===
- Mike Jason – executive producer
- Bas Hartong – A&R
- Michael A. Curtis – producer, vocal engineer
- Chris Bethea – engineer
- Lee Groitzsch – engineer
- Brent King – engineer, string engineer
- Don Snygely – mixing
- Hollis Flatt – mastering
- John B. Sparks – mastering
- Andy Baggett – design

== Awards ==
At the 41st GMA Dove Awards, Never Going Back was nominated for a Dove Award for Country Album of the Year.

== Chart performance ==
Chart (2009)	Peak position
U.S. Billboard Top Country Albums	40
