= Couldn't Last a Moment =

2000 single by Collin Raye

Single by Collin Raye

from the album Tracks
- B-side: "You Still Take Me There"
- Released: February 1, 2000
- Genre: Country
- Length: 3:41
- Label: Epic
- Songwriters: Danny Wells; Jeffrey Steele
- Producers: Dann Huff; Collin Raye

Collin Raye singles chronology
"Start Over Georgia" (1999)	"Couldn't Last a Moment" (2000)	"Tired of Loving This Way" (2000)

"Couldn't Last a Moment" is a song written by Danny Wells and Jeffrey Steele, and recorded by American country music singer Collin Raye. It was released in February 2000 as the first single from his album Tracks. The song peaked at number 3 on the US Billboard country music charts and reached number 1 on the Canadian RPM Country Tracks. It also peaked at number 43 on the Billboard Hot 100. It was Raye's last top 40 hit on the US country chart.

== Background ==
Raye stated that the song is one of the "most vulnerable" he's ever recorded. "The guy has his heart on his sleeve," he says. "Before, I would have been afraid to cut a song like that because it mirrored my life. Lyrically it's so vulnerable."

== Content ==
In the song, the narrator expresses his feelings after breaking up with his girlfriend. He states that he "couldn't last a moment" without her and attempts to get her back.

== Chart performance ==
The song debuted at number 53 on the Billboard Hot Country Singles & Tracks chart dated February 5, 2000.

Chart (2000)	Peak position
Canada Country Singles (RPM)	1
US Billboard Hot 100	43
US Hot Country Songs (Billboard)	3

=== Year-end charts ===
Chart (2000)	Position
US Country Songs (Billboard)	26
