= Twenty Years and Change =

Studio album by Collin Raye
- Released: October 25, 2005
- Studio: Emerald Sound Studios, The Tracking Room and County Q (Nashville, Tennessee); First Avenue Sound (Franklin, Tennessee)
- Genre: Country
- Length: 47:52
- Label: Aspirion
- Producer: Collin Raye; Fred Mollin; Gene Le Sage; Johnny Garcia; Stan Cornelius

Collin Raye chronology
Can't Back Down (2001)	Twenty Years and Change (2005)	Fearless (2006)

Professional ratings
Review scores
Source	Rating
Allmusic	link

Twenty Years and Change is the eighth studio album, released in 2005, by country music artist Collin Raye. His first studio album in 3 years, it produced the singles "I Know That's Right" and "Hurricane Jane", neither of which charted.

Three of the album's tracks are cover songs: "Let Your Love Flow" was previously recorded by The Bellamy Brothers; "The Search Is Over" by Survivor; and "It's Only Make Believe" was originally recorded by Conway Twitty. In addition, "Josephine" was later recorded by Joey + Rory and released as a single from their album His and Hers.

== Track listing ==
No.	Title	Writer(s)	Producer(s)	Length
1.	"I Know That's Right"	Bob DiPiero, Tom Shapiro, Rivers Rutherford	Fred Mollin, Collin Raye, Gene LeSage	3:28
2.	"Hurricane Jane"	Blair Daly, Gordie Sampson, Troy Verges	Mollin, Raye, LeSage	3:07
3.	"The Search Is Over"	Jim Peterik, Frankie Sullivan	Raye, LeSage	4:09
4.	"Forgotten"	Allison Mellon, Gene LeSage	Raye, LeSage, John Cornelius, Johnny Garcia	4:17
5.	"You're Not Drinking Enough"	Daniel Kortchmar	Raye, LeSage, Cornelius	4:36
6.	"Josephine"	Rory Lee Feek	Raye, LeSage	5:15
7.	"Heart"	LeSage, Jason Blume	Raye, LeSage	3:30
8.	"All I Can Do Is Love You"	Collin Raye, Melissa Manchester	Raye, LeSage	2:42
9.	"Let Your Love Flow"	Larry E. Williams	Raye, LeSage, Cornelius, Garcia	5:36
10.	"Twenty Years and Change"	Collin Raye	Raye, Garcia	4:54
11.	"We'll Be Alright"	LeSage, Tom Damphier	Raye, LeSage, Garcia	3:15
12.	"It's Only Make Believe"	Jack Nance, Conway Twitty	Raye, Garcia	3:03

== Personnel ==
As listed in liner notes.

- Collin Raye – lead vocals, backing vocals
- Rick Jackson – acoustic piano, keyboards, Hammond B3 organ
- Tim Lauer – accordion
- Gene Le Sage – acoustic piano, keyboards, Hammond B3 organ, backing vocals
- Steve Nathan – acoustic piano, keyboards, Hammond B3 organ
- Johnny Neel – acoustic piano, keyboards, Hammond B3 organ
- Mike Rojas – acoustic piano, keyboards, Hammond B3 organ
- Larry Beaird – acoustic guitar
- J. T. Corenflos – electric guitar
- Johnny Garcia – electric guitar
- Fred Mollin – acoustic guitar
- Steve Shehan – acoustic guitar
- C. Michael Spriggs – acoustic guitar
- John Willis – electric guitar, banjo
- Paul Franklin – steel guitar
- Sonny Garrish – steel guitar
- Glen Duncan – mandolin, fiddle
- Mike Chapman – bass
- Larry Paxton – bass
- Eddie Bayers – drums, percussion
- John Gardner – drums, percussion
- Paul Leim – drums, percussion
- Paul Scholten – drums, percussion
- Aubrey Haynie – fiddle

=== Production ===
- Phillip Houston – engineer
- Steve Marcantonio – engineer
- John Nazario – engineer
- J.D. Shuff – engineer, mixing
- Johnny Garcia – mixing
- Kyle Lehning – mixing
- Rob Mason – mixing
- Rich Hanson – assistant engineer
- J.C. Monterrosa – assistant engineer
- John Donegan – photography
- Tracy Wallner – art direction, design
- Collin Raye – liner notes

== Chart performance ==
Chart (2005)	Peak position
U.S. Billboard Top Country Albums	73
