= Somebody Else's Moon =

Single by Collin Raye

from the album In This Life
- B-side: "You Can't Take It with You"
- Released: March 29, 1993
- Studio: Sound Emporium (Nashville, Tennessee)
- Genre: Country
- Length: 3:06
- Label: Epic
- Songwriters: Paul Nelson; Tom Shapiro
- Producers: Garth Fundis; John Hobbs

Collin Raye singles chronology
"I Want You Bad (And That Ain't Good)" (1992)	"Somebody Else's Moon" (1993)	"That Was a River" (1993)

"Somebody Else's Moon" is a song written by Tom Shapiro and Paul Nelson, and recorded by American country music singer Collin Raye. It was released in March 1993 as the third single from his album, In This Life. The song reached the Top 5 on the U.S. Billboard Hot Country Singles & Tracks chart and peaked at number 11 on the Canadian RPM Country Tracks chart.

== Chart performance ==
The song debuted at number 73 on the chart dated April 3, 1993. It charted for 20 weeks on that chart, and peaked at number 5 on the chart dated July 3, 1993.

=== Charts ===
Chart (1993)	Peak position
Canada Country Singles (RPM)	11
US Hot Country Songs (Billboard)	5
