= Christmas: The Gift =

Studio album by Collin Raye
- Released: October 29, 1996
- Studio: Emerald Sound Studios, Masterfonics, The Music Mill, The Tracking Room and The Money Pit (Nashville, Tennessee)
- Genre: Christmas; country
- Length: 47:12
- Label: Epic
- Producer: John Hobbs

Collin Raye chronology
I Think About You (1995)	Christmas: The Gift (1996)	The Best of Collin Raye: Direct Hits (1997)

Professional ratings
Review scores
Source	Rating
Allmusic -	2.5/5 stars

Christmas: The Gift is an album released in 1996 by country music artist Collin Raye. It was Raye's first Christmas album. It is composed largely of cover songs, except for "It Could Happen Again", which was newly written and recorded for this album.

== Track listing ==
1. "The Christmas Song" (Mel Tormé, Robert Wells) – 4:18
2. "I'll Be Home for Christmas" (Walter Kent, Kim Gannon, Buck Ram) – 4:24
3. "It Could Happen Again" (Tamara Hyler, Will Robinson, Bruce Burch) – 4:10
  spoken intro by Johnny Cash
4. "The First Noel" (William Sandys, Traditional) – 4:29
5. "Away in a Manger" (Traditional) – 2:58
6. "White Christmas" (Irving Berlin) – 4:29
7. "Winter Wonderland" (Dick Smith, Felix Bernard) – 3:20
  guest vocals by The Beach Boys
8. "Angels We Have Heard on High" (Traditional) – 2:51
9. "The Little Drummer Boy" (Harry Simeone, Katherine Davis, Henry Onorati) – 3:19
10. "Silent Night" (Franz Gruber, Joseph Mohr) – 3:21
11. "The First Noel (Instrumental)" (William Sandys, traditional) – 4:30
12. "O Holy Night" (Adolphe Adam, John Sullivan Dwight) – 5:03

== Personnel ==
Musicians and Vocalists

- Collin Raye – vocals
- Pat Coil – keyboards
- John Hobbs – keyboards
- Dann Huff – acoustic guitar, electric guitars
- Billy Joe Walker Jr. – acoustic guitar
- Biff Watson – acoustic guitar
- Joe Chemay – bass, backing vocals
- Paul Leim – drums
- Jim Hoke – harmonica
- Jana King – backing vocals
- Anthony Martin – backing vocals
- Cindy Richardson-Walker – backing vocals
- John Wesley Ryles – backing vocals
- Dennis Wilson – backing vocals
- Johnny Cash – spoken voice (3)
- Britanny Wray – vocals (5, 10)
- Al Jardine – backing vocals (7)
- Bruce Johnston – backing vocals (7)
- Mike Love – backing vocals (7)
- Brian Wilson – backing vocals (7)
- Carl Wilson – backing vocals (7)

Orchestra

- Ronn Huff – orchestration (1, 2, 4, 7-12), arrangements (4, 8, 10-12)
- Larry Cansler – orchestration (3, 5, 6), arrangements (5)
- Carl Marsh – contractor

Horns and Woodwinds

- Cynthia Estill – bassoon
- Cassandra Lee and Lee Levine – clarinet
- Sam Levine and Ann Richards – flute
- Ellen Menking and Bobby G. Taylor – oboe
- Ernie Collins, Dennis Good, Barry Green and Chris McDonald – trombone
- Jeff Bailey, Mike Haynes and Patrick Kunkee – trumpet
- Gilbert Long – tuba
- Leslie Norton, Calvin Smith, Jeffrey Stahl, Jill Wilson and Joy Worland – French horn

Strings

- Jack Jezioro, Craig Nelson, Liz Stewart and Glen Wanner – bass
- Phil Hansen, Anthony LaMarchina, Bob Mason, Margaret Mason, Carole Rabinowitz-Neuen, Julia Tanner and David Vanderkooi – cello
- Mary Hoepfinger – harp
- Monisa Angell, Bruce Christensen, Joann Cruthirds, Jim Grosjean, Idalynn Jacobs, Kathryn Plummer, Kristin Wilkinson and Clare Yang – viola
- David Angell, David Davidson, Carl Gorodetzky, Gerald Greer, Lee Larrison, Tamera Meinecke, Michele Meininger, Cate Myer, Randall Olson, Mary Kathryn Vanosdale, Antoine Silverman, Pamela Sixfin, Bruce Sweetman, Christian Teal, Paul Tobias, Alan Umstead, Catherine Umstead and Karen Winkelman – violin

Percussion

- Sam Bacco and Farrell Morris

=== Production ===
- John Hobbs – producer
- Ed Seay – track recording, overdub recording, mixing
- Russ Martin – additional engineer
- Amy Hughes – track recording assistant
- Dean Jamison – track recording assistant, overdub recording assistant, mix assistant
- Denny Purcell – mastering at Georgetown Masters (Nashville, Tennessee)
- Lauren Koch for Big Cheese – production coordinator
- Bill Johnson – art direction
- Rollow Welch – art direction
- Frank Ockenfels 3 – photography
- Steve Cox for Scott Dean Management – management
- Collin Raye – liner notes

== Chart performance ==
Chart (1996)	Peak position
U.S. Billboard 200	126
U.S. Billboard Top Country Albums	23
U.S. Billboard Top Holiday Albums	20
