= All I Can Be (Is a Sweet Memory) =

Single by Collin Raye

from the album All I Can Be
- B-side: "Good for You"
- Released: June 8, 1991
- Genre: Country
- Length: 3:09
- Label: Epic
- Songwriter(s): Harlan Howard
- Producer(s): Jerry Fuller, John Hobbs

Collin Raye singles chronology
"All I Can Be (Is a Sweet Memory)" (1991)	"Love, Me" (1991)

"All I Can Be (Is a Sweet Memory)" is a song written by Harlan Howard and recorded by American country music artist Conway Twitty for his 1985 album Chasin' Rainbows, and Johnny Rodriguez for his 1986 album Full Circle. In June 1991, American country music artist Collin Raye released it as the first single from his album All I Can Be. The song was Raye's debut single and reached No. 29 on the Billboard Hot Country Singles & Tracks chart.

== Chart performance ==
Chart (1991)	Peak position
US Hot Country Songs (Billboard)	29
Canadian RPM Country Tracks	35
