= Every Second =

Single by Collin Raye

from the album All I Can Be
- B-side: "Any Old Stretch of Blacktop"
- Released: February 25, 1992
- Genre: Country
- Length: 2:25
- Label: Epic
- Songwriters: Gerald Smith; Wayne Perry
- Producers: Jerry Fuller; John Hobbs

Collin Raye singles chronology
"Love, Me" (1991)	"Every Second" (1992)	"In This Life" (1992)

"Every Second" is a song written by Gerald Smith and Wayne Perry, and recorded by American country music artist Collin Raye. It was released in February 1992 as the third and final single from his debut album All I Can Be.

== Chart performance ==
The song debuted at number 75 on the Hot Country Singles & Tracks chart dated February 29, 1992. It charted for 20 weeks on that chart, and peaked at number 2 on the chart dated May 23, 1992.

=== Charts ===
Chart (1992)	Peak position
Canada Country Singles (RPM)	5
US Hot Country Songs (Billboard)	2

=== Year-end charts ===
Chart (1992)	Position
Canada Country Tracks (RPM)	52
US Country Songs (Billboard)	39
