= Public opinion and activism in the Terri Schiavo case =

2000s American right-to-die debate

The case of Terri Schiavo became the subject of intense public debate and activism.

== Public opinion ==
Two polls conducted in the days following the removal of Schiavo's feeding tube on March 18, 2005, showed that a large majority of Americans believed that Michael Schiavo should have had the authority to make decisions on behalf of his wife, Terri Schiavo, and that the United States Congress overstepped its bounds with its intervention in the case.

According to an ABC News poll from March 21, 2005, 70% of Americans believed that Schiavo's death should not be a federal matter, and were opposed to the legislation transferring the case to federal court. In the same poll, when ABC said "Terri suffered brain damage and has been on life support for 15 years. Doctors say she has no consciousness and her condition is irreversible", 63% said that they support the removal of Schiavo's feeding tube. Sixty-seven percent agreed with the statement that "elected officials trying to keep Schiavo alive are doing so more for political advantage than out of concern for her or for the principles involved".

A poll by CBS News reported on March 23 showed that 82% of respondents believed Congress and the President should stay out of the matter, while 74% thought it was "all about politics". Only 13% thought Congress acted out of concern for Schiavo. Furthermore, the approval ratings of Congress sank to 34%, its lowest since 1997.

Two CNN/USA Today/Gallup polls on the case also showed public support for removing Schiavo's feeding tube, but by smaller margins. In response to the question, "Based on what you have heard or read about the case, do you think that the feeding tube should or should not have been removed?", 56% of respondents agreed and 31% disagreed when polled between March 18–20. When respondents were asked the same question on an April 1–2 poll, conducted after Schiavo's death, 53% agreed with the feeding tube's removal while 41% disagreed. Gallup concluded that "These poll results, obtained after Schiavo's death on March 31, reflect an increase in opposition to the removal of the tube compared to mid-March data." The poll also showed continued strong disapproval for Congress's involvement in the case.

== Activism and protests ==
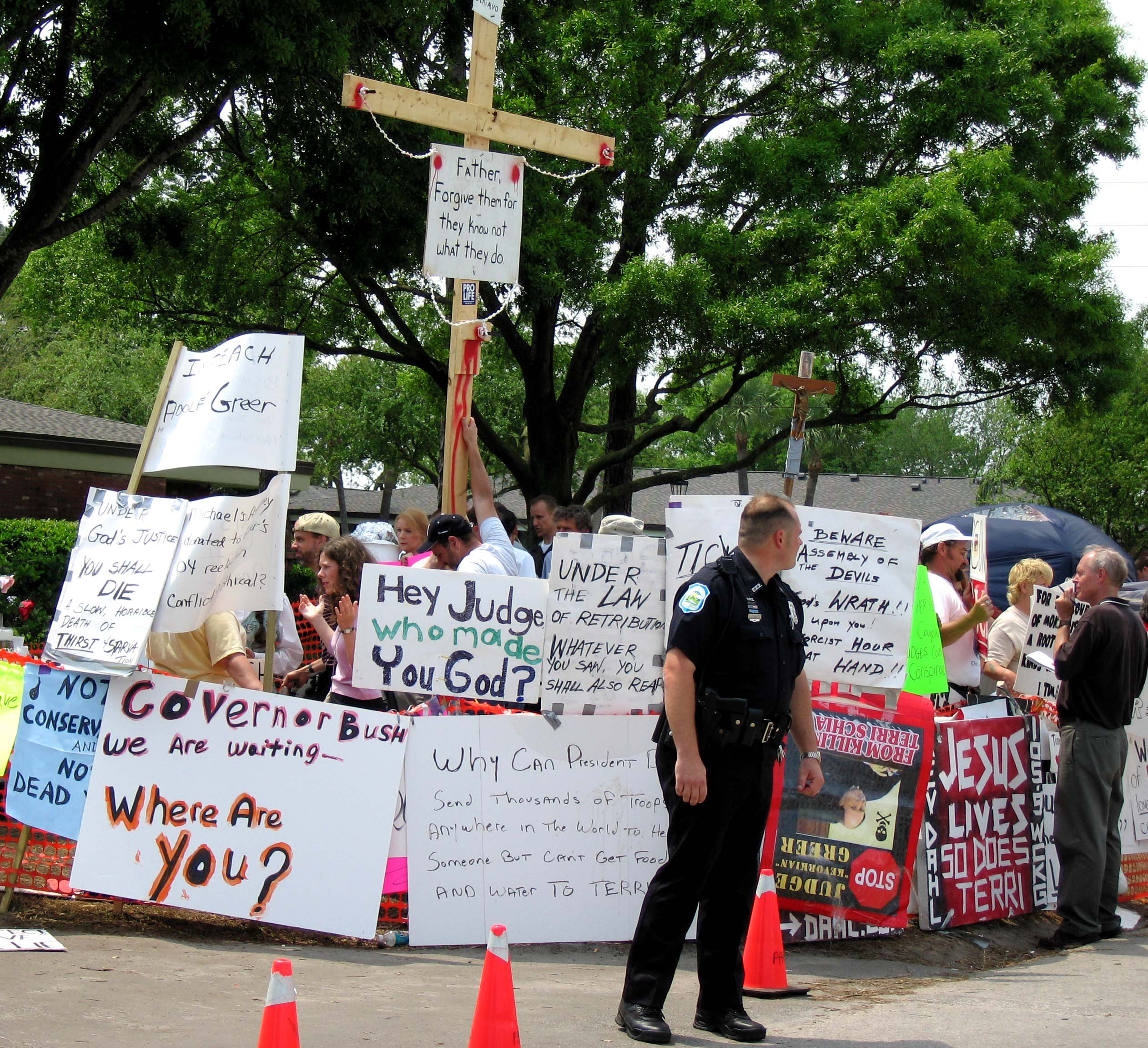
Protesters in front of Schiavo's Pinellas Park, Florida hospice, March 27, 2005.

U.S. President George W. Bush, Governor of Florida Jeb Bush, many Republicans, several Democrats in the Florida Legislature and U.S. Congress, and Vatican officials sided with Schiavo's parents. Other groups and individuals, including the American Civil Liberties Union as well as many Democratic and several Republican legislators, expressed support for the position of Michael Schiavo. One individual activist even filed a pro se appeal with the Florida State Supreme Court.

Various Christian organizations, mostly affiliated with the Christian right, demanded that Schiavo's feeding tube be reinserted. Consumer activist Ralph Nader and the Reverend Jesse Jackson, a Democrat and civil rights activist, also called for Schiavo's feeding tube to be reinserted. On March 29, 2005, Jackson prayed with the Schindler family outside of Schiavo's Florida hospice. Some groups, such as Not Dead Yet, also protested the removal of the feeding tube because they felt it violated the rights of the disabled.

Forty-seven protesters, including many children, were arrested outside the hospice where Schiavo was located. Most of these were non-violent, staged arrests for trespassing, made when protestors crossed a police line in a symbolic attempt to bring water to Schiavo. The last arrest occurred after Jackson's press conference on March 29, 2005, when a family therapist from Scranton, Pennsylvania, named Dow Pursley slipped past the police cordon and headed for the hospice's main entrance, carrying two bottles of water for Schiavo. Police officers stunned Pursley with a Taser and apprehended him. Pursley was charged with attempted burglary and resisting arrest without violence.

Richard Alan Meywes of North Carolina was accused of offering $250,000 over the Internet for the murder of Michael Schiavo and $50,000 for the murder of Judge George Greer. Because of the nature of his crimes, the Federal Bureau of Investigation was involved in the case, and Meywes was charged under Federal law. Meywes's lawyer claimed he was "not serious" about his offers.

In another case, Michael Mitchell, of Rockford, Illinois, attempted to rob a Florida gun store as part of an attempt to rescue Terri Schiavo. He selected Randall's Firearms, which was located near Schiavo's hospice in Seminole, Florida. Mitchell first entered the store and spoke with owner Randy McKenzie, and then departed. He returned twenty minutes later, drew a folding knife on McKenzie, and smashed a glass display case in an attempt to seize an aluminum gun case which contained a .454 Casull revolver and ammunition. McKenzie drew his own revolver in response, and Mitchell fled to his van and drove off, only to be quickly apprehended. "I honor his strength of conviction," Russell Mitchell said of his son, "but two wrongs don't make a right. They were wrong for starving [Schiavo], but he was wrong for committing another immoral act trying to get her loose." Mitchell was charged with attempted armed robbery, aggravated assault and criminal mischief.

Michael Schiavo's live-in girlfriend Jodi Centonze received hate mail letters. Additionally, the wife of one of Michael Schiavo's brothers was targeted; a white car drove by her home three times over the course of several hours, and on the last pass the driver shouted to her, "If Terri dies, I'm coming back to shoot you and your family." Another one of Michael Schiavo's brothers said he received death threats every time the case was in the news.

On the day Schiavo died, House Majority Leader Tom DeLay criticized the legal system and said, "The time will come for the men responsible [the judges] for this to answer for their behavior." He also threatened to impeach the judges who refused to intervene on Schiavo's behalf. "We will look at an unaccountable, arrogant, out-of-control judiciary that thumbed their nose at Congress and the president," DeLay said. On April 14, 2005, DeLay held a news conference and issued an apology for the tone of his comments. He stated, "I said something in an inartful way, and I shouldn't have said it that way, and I apologize for saying it that way."

Judge Greer and his family were placed under protection by the U.S. Marshals due to death threats for having ruled against restoring Schiavo's feeding tube. Additionally, he was asked to leave his Southern Baptist congregation, Calvary Baptist Church, in Clearwater.

During the final stages of the court battle in March 2005, around 30 individuals made a variety of complaints to the DCF, alleging various abuses. These included Terri Schiavo being in pain from recent dental work, although she had not had any dental work for years prior to that, and sensory deprivation. DCF investigators found the claims to be groundless, stating that there were "no indicators" of abuse in any of the cases and concluding that "the preponderance of the evidence shows that Michael Schiavo followed doctors' orders regarding Ms. Schiavo's diagnosis of being in a persistent vegetative state and that he provided her with appropriate care."

== Aftermath ==
The Schindler family and their supporters hold that this is a landmark case where a guardian's judgment was disputed, but ended with a court order to remove nutrition and hydration.

People on the other side of this issue, including the ACLU hold this was a private matter and the actions of the Schindlers interfered with the guardianship authority of her husband Michael Schiavo and the privacy rights of Terri Schiavo.

Advocates indicate that the rate of living will creation has increased since Terri Schiavo died. An alternate mechanism is for a person to name a close relative or one whom they trust to speak for them, granting him or her power of attorney for medical issues.

Paul Schenck's organization, NPLAC, has commissioned a sculpture to Terri Schiavo entitled Compassion.

The case prompted bishop William Skylstad, president of the USCCB, to ask the Vatican Congregation of the Doctrine of the Faith some questions as to the moral theology in such cases. The Vatican's reply, on September 14, 2007, stated that their position was that life support could not be removed from a patient in a permanent vegetative state.
