= What the Heart Wants =

Single by Collin Raye

from the album The Best of Collin Raye: Direct Hits
- Released: June 2, 1997
- Genre: Country
- Length: 3:46
- Label: Epic
- Songwriter: Michael Dulaney
- Producers: Paul Worley; John Hobbs; Ed Seay

Collin Raye singles chronology
"On the Verge" (1997)	"What the Heart Wants" (1997)	"The Gift" (1997)

"What the Heart Wants" is a song written by Michael Dulaney, and recorded by American country music singer Collin Raye. It was released in June 1997 as the first single from his compilation album The Best of Collin Raye: Direct Hits. The song peaked at #2 on the U.S. Billboard country music charts and #2 on the Canadian RPM Country Tracks.

== Chart performance ==
The song debuted at number 69 on the Billboard Hot Country Singles & Tracks chart dated June 7, 1997.

Chart (1997)	Peak position
Canada Country Singles (RPM)	2
US Hot Country Songs (Billboard)	2

=== Year-end charts ===
Chart (1997)	Position
Canada Country Tracks (RPM)	42
US Country Songs (Billboard)	39
