= Not That Different =

Single by Collin Raye

from the album I Think About You
- B-side: "Sweet Miss Behavin'"
- Released: November 14, 1995
- Recorded: 1995
- Genre: Country
- Length: 3:56
- Label: Epic
- Songwriters: Karen Taylor-Good; Joie Scott
- Producers: John Hobbs; Ed Seay; Paul Worley

Collin Raye singles chronology
"One Boy, One Girl" (1995)	"Not That Different" (1995)	"I Think About You" (1996)

"Not That Different" is a song written by Karen Taylor-Good and Joie Scott, and recorded by American country music singer Collin Raye. It was released in November 1995 the second single from his album I Think About You. It peaked at number 3 on the United States Billboard Hot Country Singles & Tracks chart and at number 10 on the Canadian RPM Country Tracks chart. It also peaked at number 14 on the Billboard Bubbling Under Hot 100.

== Critical reception ==
Chuck Taylor, of Billboard magazine reviewed the song favorably saying that the song touches "people where they live, love, and hope." He goes on to say that Raye gives a "flawless performance."

== Music video ==
The music video was directed by Steven Goldmann and premiered in late 1995.

== Chart positions ==
Chart (1995–1996)	Peak position
Canada Country Singles (RPM)	10
US Bubbling Under Hot 100 (Billboard)	14
US Hot Country Songs (Billboard)	3

=== Year-end charts ===
Chart (1996)	Position
US Country Songs (Billboard)	48

== Personnel ==
From I Think About You liner notes.

- Larry Byrom - electric guitar
- Joe Chemay - bass guitar
- Paul Franklin - steel guitar
- John Hobbs - piano, synthesizer
- Dann Huff - electric guitar
- Paul Leim - drums
- Billy Joe Walker Jr. - acoustic guitar
- Biff Watson - acoustic guitar
- Dennis Wilson - background vocals
- Curtis Young - background vocals
