= In This Life (Collin Raye album) =

Studio album by Collin Raye
- Released: August 25, 1992
- Recorded: 1992
- Studio: Sound Emporium Studios (Nashville, Tennessee)
- Genre: Country
- Length: 32:20
- Label: Epic
- Producer: Garth Fundis John Hobbs

Collin Raye chronology
All I Can Be (1991)	In This Life (1992)	Extremes (1994)

Singles from In This Life
- 1. "In This Life" Released: July 27, 1992; 2. "I Want You Bad (And That Ain't Good)" Released: November 30, 1992; 3. "Somebody Else's Moon" Released: March 29, 1993; 4. "That Was a River" Released: July 27, 1993

Professional ratings
Review scores
Source	Rating
Allmusic	4/5 stars
Entertainment Weekly	B
Los Angeles Times	2/4 stars
Orlando Sentinel	2/5 stars

In This Life is the second studio album by American country music artist Collin Raye. Its title track was Raye's second song to reach Number One. "That Was a River", "Somebody Else's Moon" and "I Want You Bad (And That Ain't Good)" were also released as singles. "Big River" is a cover of a Johnny Cash song, while "Let It Be Me" is a cover of a song popularized by the Everly Brothers.

== Track listing ==
No.	Title	Writer(s)	Length
1.	"What They Don't Know"	Stan Munsey, Tony Haselden	3:27
2.	"In This Life"	Mike Reid, Allen Shamblin	3:13
3.	"Big River"	Johnny Cash	3:13
4.	"Somebody Else's Moon"	Paul Nelson, Tom Shapiro	3:06
5.	"You Can't Take It with You"	Kix Brooks, Don Cook, Chick Rains	3:07
6.	"That Was a River"	Rick Giles, Susan Longacre	3:13
7.	"I Want You Bad (And That Ain't Good)"	Jackson Leap	2:32
8.	"Latter Day Cowboy"	Hugh Prestwood	3:59
9.	"Many a Mile"	Mark D. Sanders, Bob Regan	3:10
10.	"Let It Be Me"	Gilbert Bécaud, Mann Curtis, Pierre Delanoë	3:12

== Personnel ==
- Collin Raye – lead vocals, harmony vocals
- John Hobbs – acoustic piano, string arrangements
- Kraig Hutchens – electric guitars
- Brent Mason – electric guitars
- Billy Joe Walker Jr. – acoustic guitars
- Weldon Myrick – steel guitar
- Sam Bush – mandolin
- Dave Pomeroy – bass
- Steve Turner – drums
- Rob Hajacos – fiddle
- The Nashville String Machine – strings
- Joe Chemay – harmony vocals
- Garth Fundis – harmony vocals
- Gene Le Sage – harmony vocals
- Harry Stinson – harmony vocals
- Sammy Wray – harmony vocals

=== Production ===
- John Hobbs – producer
- Garth Fundis – producer, mixing
- Gary Laney – recording engineer, mixing
- Dave Sinko – mixing, recording assistant
- Denny Purcell – mastering at Georgetown Masters (Nashville, Tennessee)
- Scott Paschall – production assistant
- Bill Johnson – art direction
- Rollow Welch – design
- Frank W. Ockenfels 3 – photography
- Steve Cox and Ted Files for Scott Dean Management – management

== Chart performance ==
Chart (1992)	Peak position
U.S. Billboard Top Country Albums	10
U.S. Billboard 200	42
Canadian RPM Country Albums	12
