= Man of My Word (Collin Raye song) =

"Man Of My Word"

Single by Collin Raye

from the album Extremes
- B-side: "Nothin' a Little Love Won't Cure"
- Released: August 2, 1994
- Recorded: 1993
- Genre: Country
- Length: 3:23
- Label: Epic
- Songwriters: Gary Burr; Allen Shamblin
- Producers: John Hobbs, Ed Seay, Paul Worley

Collin Raye singles chronology
"Little Rock" (1994)	"Man Of My Word" (1994)	"My Kind of Girl" (1994)

"Man Of My Word" is a song written by Gary Burr and Allen Shamblin, and recorded by American country music singer Collin Raye that reached the Top Ten on the Billboard Hot Country Singles & Tracks chart. It was released in August 1994 as the third single from his CD Extremes.

== Chart performance ==
The song debuted at number 68 on the Hot Country Singles & Tracks chart dated August 6, 1994. It charted for 20 weeks on that chart, and peaked at number 8 on the chart dated November 5, 1994.

=== Charts ===
Chart (1994)	Peak position
Canada Country Singles (RPM)	5
US Hot Country Songs (Billboard)	8

=== Year-end charts ===
Chart (1994)	Position
Canada Country Tracks (RPM)	96
