= If I Were You (Collin Raye song) =

Single by Collin Raye

from the album Extremes
- B-side: "A Bible and a Bus Ticket Home"
- Released: April 3, 1995
- Recorded: 1993–1994
- Genre: Country
- Length: 4:06
- Label: Epic
- Songwriters: John Hobbs; Chris Farren
- Producers: John Hobbs; Ed Seay; Paul Worley

Collin Raye singles chronology
"My Kind of Girl" (1994)	"If I Were You" (1995)	"One Boy, One Girl" (1995)

"If I Were You" is a song written by John Hobbs and Chris Farren, and recorded by American country music singer Collin Raye. It was released in April 1995 as the fifth and final single from his album Extremes. It peaked at #4 both in the United States and in Canada. The song is not to be confused with a different composition titled "If I Were You", which appears on Raye's debut album All I Can Be.

== Chart positions ==
"If I Were You" debuted at number 62 on the U.S. Billboard Hot Country Singles & Tracks for the week of April 8, 1995.

Chart (1995)	Peak position
Canada Country Singles (RPM)	4
US Hot Country Songs (Billboard)	4

=== Year-end charts ===
Chart (1995)	Position
Canada Country Tracks (RPM)	87
US Country Songs (Billboard)	34
