= That Was a River =

"That Was A River"

Single by Collin Raye

from the album In This Life
- B-side: "Big River"
- Released: July 27, 1993
- Studio: Sound Emporium (Nashville, Tennessee)
- Genre: Country
- Length: 3:13
- Label: Epic
- Songwriters: Rick Giles; Susan Longacre
- Producers: Garth Fundis, John Hobbs

Collin Raye singles chronology
"Somebody Else's Moon" (1993)	"That Was A River" (1993)	"That's My Story" (1993)

"That Was A River" is a song written by Susan Longacre and Rick Giles, and recorded by American country music singer Collin Raye that peaked at number 4 on the Billboard Hot Country Singles & Tracks chart. It was released in July 1993 as the fourth and final single from his CD In This Life.

Raye debuted the song at the 28th ACM Awards on May 11, 1993 (2 months before being released as a single) as part of a "Top New Male Vocalist Medley" alongside nominees Billy Ray Cyrus and Tracy Lawrence, who performed their hit songs "Some Gave All" and "Alibis".

== Chart performance ==
The song debuted at number 68 on the Hot Country Singles & Tracks chart dated August 7, 1993. It charted for 20 weeks on that chart, and peaked at number 4 on the chart dated November 20, 1993.

=== Charts ===
Chart (1993)	Peak position
Canada Country Singles (RPM)	15
US Hot Country Songs (Billboard)	4

=== Year-end charts ===
Chart (1993)	Position
US Country Songs (Billboard)	64
