= That's My Story (song) =

Single by Collin Raye

from the album Extremes
- B-side: "Border and Beyond"
- Released: December 13, 1993
- Genre: Country
- Length: 3:03
- Label: Epic
- Songwriters: Lee Roy Parnell; Tony Haselden
- Producers: John Hobbs, Ed Seay, Paul Worley

Collin Raye singles chronology
"That Was a River" (1993)	"That's My Story" (1993)	"Little Rock" (1994)

"That's My Story" is a song written by Lee Roy Parnell and Tony Haselden, and recorded by American country music artist Collin Raye. It was released in December 1993 as the first single from his album Extremes.

The song features the repeating refrain "that's my story, and I'm sticking to it," which also later became the catchphrase of actor and comedian Colin Quinn (Saturday Night Live, Grown Ups, Trainwreck).

== Content ==
When confronted by his significant other about where he had been the previous night after stumbling in one morning, the singer claims he had spent the night outside in his hammock, asserting "that's my story, and I'm sticking to it." She catches him in the lie, noting that she had placed the hammock in the attic a week ago; he initially, and unconvincingly, tries to stick to the lie, but eventually changes the lie claiming he was playing cards with his friends, (when he was actually with another woman) and that to avoid a repeat of the situation, she should buy a mobile phone.

== Music video ==
The music video was directed by Jon Small, and premiered in late 1993.

== Chart performance ==
The song debuted at number 52 on the Hot Country Songs chart dated December 18, 1993. It charted for 20 weeks on that chart and peaked at number 6 on the chart dated March 19, 1994.

=== Charts ===
Chart (1993–1994)	Peak position
Canada Country Singles (RPM)	18
US Hot Country Songs (Billboard)	6

=== Year-end charts ===
Chart (1994)	Position
US Country Songs (Billboard)	62
