= Love, Me =

1991 single by Collin Raye

Single by Collin Raye

from the album All I Can Be
- B-side: "Blue Magic"
- Released: October 1991
- Genre: Country, country pop
- Length: 3:51
- Label: Epic
- Songwriters: Skip Ewing; Max T. Barnes
- Producers: Jerry Fuller, John Hobbs

Collin Raye singles chronology
"All I Can Be (Is a Sweet Memory)" (1991)	"Love, Me" (1991)	"Every Second" (1992)

Music video
- "Love, Me" on YouTube

"Love, Me" is a song written by Skip Ewing and Max T. Barnes, and recorded by American country music artist Collin Raye. It was released in October 1991 as the second single from the album All I Can Be. In January 1992, the single became Raye's first Number One single on the U.S. Billboard Hot Country Singles & Tracks charts; the same year, the song received a Song of the Year nomination from the Country Music Association. The single has been cited as a popular choice for funerals.

== Content ==
"Love, Me" is a ballad in the key of C major, accompanied by Fender Rhodes electric piano and steel-string acoustic guitar. It tells of a couple who promise to love each other. The song's narrator tells of being with his grandfather, and reading a note that was written by his late grandmother back when both grandparents were younger. The grandfather explains that he had intended to meet her at a certain tree: "If you get there before I do, don't give up on me / I'll meet you when my chores are through, I don't know how long I'll be / But I'm not gonna let you down, darling, wait and see / And between now and then, 'til I see you again, I'll be loving you / Love, me." In the second verse, the narrator and his grandfather are at a church where they stopped to pray just before the late grandmother died, and the grandfather reads the note and begins to cry, that is the first time that he ever saw his grandfather crying in all his fifteen years.

== Music video ==
The music video was directed by Peter Lippman and premiered in late 1991.

== Chart positions ==
Chart (1991–1992)	Peak position
Canada Country Singles (RPM)	1
US Hot Country Songs (Billboard)	1

=== Year-end charts ===
Chart (1992)	Position
Canada Country Tracks (RPM)	38
US Country Songs (Billboard)	23

== Accolades ==
Year	Nominee / work	Award	Result
1992	"Love, Me"	Country Music Association Award for Single of the Year	Nominated
1992	"Love, Me"	Country Music Association Award for Song of the Year	Nominated
1993	"Love, Me"	Academy of Country Music Award for Single Record of the Year	Nominated
