= Little Rock (Collin Raye song) =

Single by Collin Raye

from the album Extremes
- B-side: "Dreaming My Dreams with You"
- Released: March 28, 1994
- Recorded: 1993
- Genre: Country
- Length: 3:51
- Label: Epic
- Songwriter: Tom Douglas
- Producers: Ed Seay; Paul Worley

Collin Raye singles chronology
| "That's My Story" (1993) | "Little Rock" (1994) | "Man of My Word" (1994) |

"Little Rock" is a song written by Tom Douglas, and recorded by American country music singer Collin Raye. It was released in March 1994 as the second single from his CD, Extremes. The song peaked at number 2 on the U.S. Billboard Hot Country Singles & Tracks chart and number 7 on the Canadian RPM Country Tracks.

== Content ==
"Little Rock" centers around a man, who is a recovering alcoholic trying to rebuild his life in Little Rock, Arkansas, which also serves as a metaphor for the faltering relationship he left behind. He explains to his significant other that since leaving home to start over, he has taken a job selling VCR's at a Walmart, that he hasn't had a drink in nineteen days, and that he has found religion ("I like the preacher from the Church of Christ"). The narrator repeats the phrase "I think I'm on a roll here in Little Rock" but later explains that his only problem is that his significant other is not with him.

== Critical reception ==
Deborah Evans Price, of Billboard magazine reviewed the song favorably saying that the "cinematic" production and "Raye's on-the-money delivery are the perfect vehicles for this moving song about a guy who's hit bottom and is climbing back up one step at a time.

== Music video ==
The music video was directed and produced by Sherman Halsey and premiered in mid-1994.

The video follows the song storyline by depicting a recovering alcoholic. In this case he has bought a bottle of liquor and pours himself a shot, and is clearly tempted to "fall off the wagon" after those nineteen days, but at the very end he is shown pouring the shot into the sink, having apparently resisted the temptation.

The video also shows flashback scenes of him as a child witnessing his parents involved in a domestic confrontation as a result of his father's alcohol abuse, which leaves him visibly shaken and flash forwarding to him as an adult involved in a similar situation with his wife, as his son witnesses the confrontation unfold. Unlike his father, he stops and consoles his son after realizing the trauma he put him through as a result of his own alcohol abuse.

== Chart performance ==
The song debuted at number 63 on the Billboard Hot Country Singles & Tracks chart dated April 9, 1994. It charted for 20 weeks on that chart, and peaked at number 2 on the chart dated July 2, 1994 (having been blocked from number 1 by Neal McCoy's "Wink").

=== Charts ===
| Chart (1994) | Peak position |
|---|---|
| Canada Country Singles (RPM) | 7 |
| US Hot Country Songs (Billboard) | 2 |

=== Year-end charts ===
| Chart (1994) | Position |
|---|---|
| US Country Songs (Billboard) | 14 |
