= Extremes (album) =

Studio album by Collin Raye
- Released: January 25, 1994
- Recorded: 1993
- Studios: The Money Pit and Javelina Recording Studios (Nashville, Tennessee)
- Genre: Country
- Length: 35:24
- Label: Epic
- Producers: John Hobbs Ed Seay Paul Worley

Collin Raye chronology
In This Life (1992)	Extremes (1994)	I Think About You (1995)

Singles from Extremes
- 1. "That's My Story" Released: December 13, 1993; 2. "Little Rock" Released: March 28, 1994; 3. "Man of My Word" Released: August 2, 1994; 4. "My Kind of Girl" Released: November 29, 1994; 5. "If I Were You" Released: April 3, 1995

Professional ratings
Review scores
Source	Rating
Allmusic	link

Extremes is the third studio album by American country music artist Collin Raye. As with Raye's first two albums, Extremes received platinum certification in the United States for sales of over one million copies. The singles released from this album were "That's My Story", "Man of My Word", "My Kind of Girl", "If I Were You" and "Little Rock". "My Kind of Girl" was a Number One hit on the Hot Country Songs charts, while the other singles all reached Top Ten.

"Dreaming My Dreams with You" is a cover of the Waylon Jennings song from his album of the same name, and "A Bible and a Bus Ticket Home" was later recorded by Confederate Railroad on their album Keep On Rockin'.

== Track listing ==
No.	Title	Writer(s)	Length
1.	"That's My Story"	Lee Roy Parnell, Tony Haselden	3:03
2.	"Man of My Word"	Gary Burr, Allen Shamblin	3:23
3.	"My Kind of Girl"	Monty Powell, John Jarrard, Debi Cochran	2:55
4.	"Little Rock"	Tom Douglas	3:58
5.	"A Bible and a Bus Ticket Home"	James Dean Hicks, Craig Wiseman	3:55
6.	"Nothin' a Little Love Won't Cure"	Larry Boone, Rick Bowles, Don Cook	3:26
7.	"If I Were You"	John Hobbs, Chris Farren	4:06
8.	"To the Border and Beyond"	Collin Raye	2:55
9.	"Angel of No Mercy"	Jim McBride, Chapin Hartford	3:38
10.	"Dreaming My Dreams with You"	Allen Reynolds	3:56

== Personnel ==
- Collin Raye – lead vocals, backing vocals (8)
- John Hobbs – acoustic piano, backing vocals (3), synthesizers (4), string arrangements (4, 7, 10)
- Larry Byrom – electric guitars (1, 2, 4–10), acoustic guitar (3, 10)
- Billy Joe Walker Jr. – electric guitars (1, 3, 6, 8), acoustic guitar (2, 4, 5, 7, 9, 10)
- Biff Watson – acoustic guitar (1, 2, 4–10)
- Paul Worley – electric guitars (6), acoustic guitar (9, 10)
- Dan Dugmore – steel guitar (2–5, 9, 10)
- Paul Franklin –steel guitar (6, 7)
- Joe Chemay – bass, backing vocals (4, 7)
- Eddie Bayers – drums (1, 5, 9)
- Lonnie Wilson – drums (2, 4, 6–8, 10)
- Paul Leim - drums (3)
- Rob Hajacos – fiddle (1, 2, 8, 9)
- Carl Gorodetzky – strings (4, 7, 10)
- The Nashville String Machine – strings (4, 7, 10)
- Gene Le Sage – backing vocals (1, 2, 6, 9)
- Sammy Wray – backing vocals (1)
- Scotty Wray – backing vocals (1, 2, 6, 9)
- Anthony Martin – backing vocals (3, 4, 7)
- John Wesley Ryles – backing vocals (3)
- Dennis Wilson – backing vocals (4, 5, 7)
- Curtis Young – backing vocals (4, 5)

=== Production ===
- John Hobbs – producer
- Paul Worley – producer
- Ed Seay – producer, recording, mixing
- Anthony Martin – recording assistant, mix assistant
- Robert Charles – assistant string engineer
- Keith Odle – digital editing
- Don Cobb – digital editing
- Carlos Grier – digital editing
- Denny Purcell – mastering
- GroundStar Laboratories (Nashville, Tennessee) – editing location
- Georgetown Masters (Nashville, Tennessee) – editing and mastering location
- Tammy Brown – production coordinator
- Bret Lopez – photography
- Bill Johnson – art direction
- Rollow Welch – design
- Mimi De Blasio – wardrobe
- Scott Dean Management – management

== Charts ==
=== Weekly charts ===
Chart (1994)	Peak position
US Billboard 200	73
US Top Country Albums (Billboard)	12

=== Year-end charts ===
Chart (1994)	Position
US Top Country Albums (Billboard)	36
Chart (1995)	Position
US Top Country Albums (Billboard)	51

== Certifications ==
Region	Certification	Certified units/sales
Canada (Music Canada)	Platinum	100,000^{^}
United States (RIAA)	Platinum	1,000,000^{^}
^{^} Shipments figures based on certification alone.
