= My Kind of Girl (Collin Raye song) =

Single by Collin Raye

from the album Extremes
- B-side: "Angel of No Mercy"
- Released: November 29, 1994
- Recorded: 1993
- Genre: Country
- Length: 2:55
- Label: Epic
- Songwriters: Debi Cochran; John Jarrard; Monty Powell
- Producers: John Hobbs; Ed Seay; Paul Worley

Collin Raye singles chronology
"Man of My Word" (1994)	"My Kind of Girl" (1994)	"If I Were You" (1995)

"My Kind of Girl" is a song written by Debi Cochran, John Jarrard and Monty Powell, and recorded by American country music singer Collin Raye that reached the top of the Billboard Hot Country Singles & Tracks chart. It was released in November 1994 as the fourth single from his album Extremes.

== Chart performance ==
The song debuted at number 61 on the Hot Country Singles & Tracks chart dated December 3, 1994. It charted for 20 weeks on that chart, and became Collin's third Number One single on the chart dated February 18, 1995, holding the top spot for one week.

=== Charts ===
Chart (1994–1995)	Peak position
Canada Country Singles (RPM)	24
US Hot Country Songs (Billboard)	1

=== Year-end charts ===
Chart (1995)	Position
US Country Songs (Billboard)	35
