= Collin Raye =

American country music singer (born 1960)

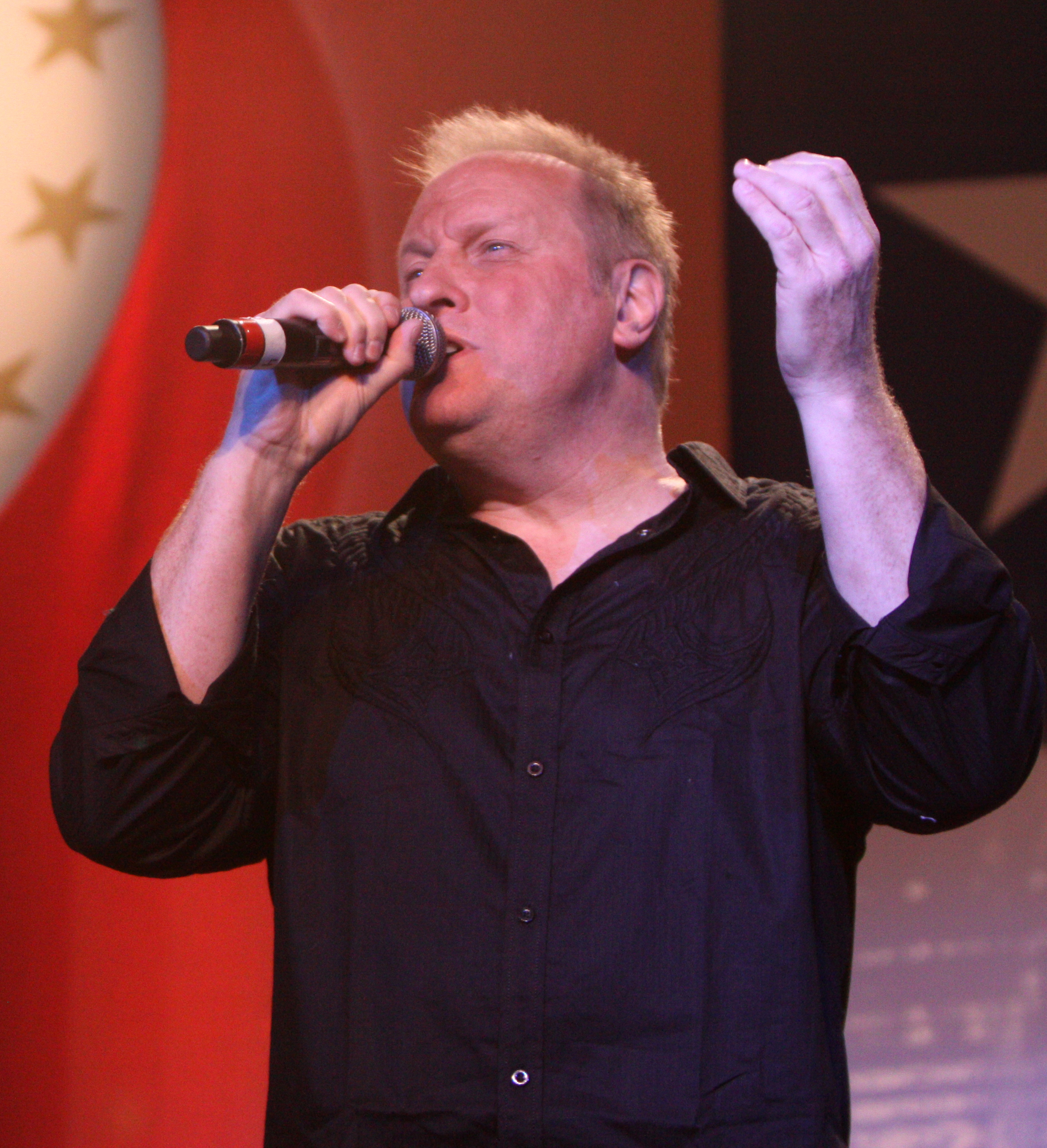
- Raye performing in Washington, D.C. in 2011

Background information
- Also known as: Bubba Wray
- Born: Floyd Elliot Wray (Note: While many sources give Raye's middle name as Collin, Broadcast Music Incorporated and the singer's official website both list it as Elliot.); August 22, 1960 (age 66) (Note: Some sources give Raye's date of birth as 1959, but his official website gives it as 1960.); De Queen, Arkansas, U.S.
- Origin: Nashville, Tennessee, U.S.
- Genre: Country
- Instruments: Vocals, guitar, bass guitar
- Years active: 1983–present
- Labels: Epic Nashville; Aspirion; Country Roads; Starpointe; Saguaro Road
- Formerly of: The Wrays
- Website: www.collinraye.com

Floyd Elliot Wray (born August 22, 1960), known professionally as Collin Raye and previously as Bubba Wray, is an American country music singer. He initially recorded as a member of the band The Wrays between 1983 and 1987. He made his solo debut in 1991 as Collin Raye with the album All I Can Be, which produced his first Number One hit in "Love, Me". All I Can Be was the first of four consecutive albums released by Raye to achieve platinum certification in the United States for sales of one million copies each. Raye maintained several Top Ten hits throughout the rest of the decade and into 2000. 2001's Can't Back Down was his first album that did not produce a Top 40 country hit, and he was dropped by his record label soon afterward. He did not record another studio album until 2005's Twenty Years and Change, released on an independent label.

Between 1991 and 2007, Raye charted 30 singles on the U.S. country charts; he has also charted twice on the Adult Contemporary format as a duet partner on two Jim Brickman songs. Four of Raye's singles have reached Number One on the Billboard country music charts: 1992's "Love, Me" and "In This Life", 1995's "My Kind of Girl", and 1998's "I Can Still Feel You". He has also recorded a total of 11 studio albums, counting a Christmas album and a compilation of lullabies, in addition to releasing a Greatest Hits compilation, a live album, and a live CD/DVD package.

== Early years ==
Floyd Elliot Wray was born in De Queen, Arkansas. His mother, Lois Wray, was a local musician; in the 1950s, she served as an opening act for several Sun Records artists, including Jerry Lee Lewis, Elvis Presley, Johnny Cash and Carl Perkins. Later, she became a solo musician in her own right; she would occasionally bring both Collin and his brother Scott (known professionally as Scotty Wray, died February 2022) onstage to sing harmony vocals. By the 1980s, the two brothers began a country-rock band called the Wray Brothers Band, in which Collin assumed the stage name Bubba Wray. The Wray Brothers Band performed primarily in the state of Texas; Corvallis, Oregon; and later in Reno, Nevada; eventually releasing singles on independent labels. By 1986, the band (which had shortened its name to The Wrays) signed to Mercury Records, releasing four singles. After the singles performed poorly on the charts, The Wrays disbanded.

== Solo career ==
=== All I Can Be ===
After altering the spelling of his last name to Raye, he was signed to a record deal with Epic Records in 1990. His debut single, "All I Can Be (Is a Sweet Memory)", entered the charts in 1991, reaching a peak of No. 29 on the Billboard Hot Country Singles & Tracks charts. Raye's first album, also titled All I Can Be, was released soon afterward.

The follow-up single, a ballad co-written by Skip Ewing and titled "Love, Me," reached number 1 on the country music charts in early 1992, holding the peak position for three weeks. All I Can Be was then certified platinum by the Recording Industry Association of America (RIAA). The album's final single was "Every Second," which peaked at No. 2 on Billboard.

=== In This Life and Extremes ===
Raye's second album, titled In This Life, was released in 1992. The album's title track, which served as its lead-off single, spent two weeks at number 1 and crossed over to the Adult Contemporary charts with a peak of number 21. In late 1992, Raye made an appearance on the Carl Weathers television drama series "Street Justice", where he gave a live performance of "In This Life". The second-season episode, entitled "Country Justice", was directed by David Winning. The album produced three additional Top Ten country hits in "I Want You Bad (And That Ain't Good)", "Somebody Else's Moon", and "That Was a River", in addition to achieving his second platinum certification.

Extremes, Raye's third album, was released in 1993. It was his first to be produced by Paul Worley and Ed Seay, the latter of whom would serve as Raye's co-producer until 2000. The lead single, "That's My Story", was co-written by Lee Roy Parnell, who recorded for Arista Nashville at the time. Following it was "Little Rock", a song about a recovering alcoholic. The song's accompanying music video also promoted Al-Anon, an international support group for friends and family of alcoholics. Also released from the album were the Top 10 hits "Man of My Word", "My Kind of Girl", and "If I Were You". "My Kind of Girl" became Raye's third number 1 hit, while the other two singles reached Top 10 as well.

Also in 1993, he was nominated by the Academy of Country Music for Top New Male Vocalist, along with Billy Ray Cyrus and Tracy Lawrence, but lost to Tracy.

=== I Think About You and The Best of Collin Raye: Direct Hits ===
I Think About You was the title of Raye's fourth album. Released in 1995, it produced six singles overall and became Raye's fourth consecutive platinum-certified album. Of the singles, the first three all reached Top 5: "One Boy, One Girl", "Not That Different", and the title track, whose music video won a Video of the Year award from the Academy of Country Music. While "Not That Different" was climbing the charts, the album track "What If Jesus Comes Back Like That" received unsolicited airplay which brought it as high as number 57. After "I Think About You", "Love Remains" peaked at number 12, followed by an official release of "What If Jesus Comes Back Like That" which achieved a peak of number 21. The album's sixth and final single was "On the Verge", at number 2.

In 1996, Raye also released a Christmas album titled Christmas: The Gift. He also appeared on Stars and Stripes Vol. 1, a Beach Boys album featuring lead vocals by country musicians. A year later, his first Greatest Hits package was issued; titled The Best of Collin Raye: Direct Hits, it comprised several of his hit singles from the past five years, as well as four new songs, of which three released as singles. "What the Heart Wants" and "Little Red Rodeo" both reached Top Five on the country music charts, while "The Gift", a collaboration with Jim Brickman and Susan Ashton, was a top 5 hit on the Adult Contemporary charts. The album also included a cover of Journey's "Open Arms", with Raye's version reaching a peak of number 70 from unsolicited airplay. Direct Hits received a gold certification from the RIAA for selling 500,000 copies in the United States.

=== The Walls Came Down ===
The Walls Came Down was the title of Raye's fifth studio album. Released in 1998, it produced his fourth and final Billboard number 1 single in "I Can Still Feel You". "Someone You Used to Know" and the Radney Foster-penned "Anyone Else" were both Top Five hits as well. "Start Over Georgia", the fourth single (co-written by Raye's brother), peaked at No. 39. Also included on The Walls Came Down was a ballad entitled "The Eleventh Commandment", in which Raye addressed the issue of child abuse. Although not released as a single, "The Eleventh Commandment" was made into a music video, which featured a number for a child abuse hotline at the end. The same year, he appeared on compilation CD Tribute To Tradition (released on Columbia label) with cover versions of "Cold Cold Heart" (country classic recorded by Hank Williams in 1957) and "Honky Tonk Heroes (Like Me)" (a major hit for Waylon Jennings in 1973, written by Billy Joe Shaver). Raye duets with Joe Diffie on the latter song. In late 1999, Raye sang backing vocals on Phil Vassar's debut single "Carlene".

=== 2000–2005 ===
Raye released two albums in 2000: Counting Sheep, an album consisting of lullabies for his children, and Tracks. The first single release from Tracks, "Couldn't Last a Moment", was a top 5 hit on the country charts. "Tired of Loving This Way", which followed, was a duet with singer and actress Bobbie Eakes. Although it was Raye's first single to miss the Top 40 entirely, it provided Eakes with her only appearance on the country music charts. "She's All That" and "You Still Take Me There" were also released, but they failed to make top 40 as well.

Can't Back Down, Raye's last album for Epic, was released in 2001. Neither of the album's two singles entered Top 40 on the country music charts. Because of a conflict with his label, Raye asked out of his contract that year. Although he did not have a record label at the time, he entered the Adult Contemporary charts for the third time in 2003, as a duet partner on Jim Brickman's single "Peace (Where the Heart Is)". Raye released a live album, Live at Billy Bob's Texas, in 2004, and a promotional single titled "World History 101" in 2005.

=== 2005–present ===
In 2005, Raye signed to the independent Aspirion label, releasing his Twenty Years and Change album. Two singles were released from the album, although neither single charted. The same year, Raye appeared in television commercials for Fruit of the Loom underwear, in which he sang the jingle "You Can't Over-Love Your Underwear". Another studio album, Fearless, was released in 2006 on Country Roads Records, although it did not produce any singles.

In 2007, a CD/DVD combination titled The Power in You was released, followed by an EP titled Selected Hits. The latter includes "That's My Story", "Little Rock", "I Think About You", and "Love, Me", as well as two new tracks: "A Soldier's Prayer" and "Quitters", the latter of which was co-written by Canadian country singer George Canyon. Both of the new tracks were released as singles in 2007, and the former peaked at No. 59 on Hot Country Songs.

Raye's next album, Never Going Back, was released on April 28, 2009, on the Saguaro Road label. Its first single is "Mid-Life Chrysler". It also includes the track "She's With Me," which is a tribute to Raye's granddaughter, Haley, who died from a severe but undiagnosed brain disorder.

Raye released his autobiography A Voice Undefeated in 2014.

== Musical stylings ==
Raye is known primarily for his country pop ballads, such as "Love, Me" (a popular choice at funerals) and "In This Life" (one of the most popular wedding songs of the 1990s).

Raye is also known for dealing with social issues in his material. "Little Rock", for example, tells of a recovering alcoholic; its music video included the number for Al-Anon, as a means of public service announcement. "What If Jesus Comes Back Like That", from his I Think About You album, is a power ballad that poses questions about the return of Jesus Christ in the modern world. In "The Eleventh Commandment", a track from The Walls Came Down, Raye addresses child abuse, suggesting "honor thy children" as an eleventh commandment to accompany the Ten Commandments. In the song's music video, a telephone number for the child abuse hotline ChildHelp USA was included.

== Religious conversion ==
Raye was raised as a Southern Baptist but became a Catholic when he was 23 years old. On February 17, 2016, Raye performed at the "Two Nations, One Faith" celebration at Sun Bowl Stadium in El Paso, Texas, prior to the stadium's simulcast of the Mass celebrated by Pope Francis just across the Mexican border in Ciudad Juarez.

== Personal life ==
Raye married Connie Parker in 1980; they divorced in 1987. They have a daughter, Brittany (born February 10, 1983), and a son, Jacob (born March 31, 1985). Raye lives in Nashville with his daughter and granddaughter.

== Social activism ==
In 2011, Raye became the national spokesperson for the Terri Schiavo Life & Hope Network.

== Discography ==
- All I Can Be (1991)
- In This Life (1992)
- Extremes (1994)
- I Think About You (1995)
- Christmas: The Gift (1996)
- The Walls Came Down (1998)
- Tracks (2000)
- Can't Back Down (2001)
- Twenty Years and Change (2005)
- Fearless (2006)
- Never Going Back (2009)
- His Love Remains (2011)
- Still on the Line...The Songs of Glen Campbell (2013)
- Everlasting (2014)
- Scars (2020)

=== Billboard number-one hits ===
- "Love, Me" (3 weeks, 1992)
- "In This Life" (2 weeks, 1992)
- "My Kind of Girl" (1 week, 1995)
- "I Can Still Feel You" (2 weeks, 1998)

== Awards and nominations ==
=== Academy of Country Music Awards ===
Year	Nominee / work	Award	Result
1993	Collin Raye	Top New Male Vocalist	Nominated
1993	"Love, Me"	Single Record of the Year	Nominated
1993	"In This Life"	Song of the Year	Shortlisted
1995	"Little Rock"	Song of the Year	Shortlisted
1996	"Not That Different"	Video of the Year	Nominated
1997	"I Think About You"	Video of the Year	Won
1997	Collin Raye	Top Male Vocalist of the Year	Nominated
1998	Collin Raye	Top Male Vocalist of the Year	Nominated
1999	Collin Raye	Top Male Vocalist of the Year	Nominated
2000	Collin Raye	Top Male Vocalist of the Year	Nominated

=== Country Music Association Awards ===
Year	Nominee / work	Award	Result
1992	"Love, Me"	Single of the Year	Nominated
1996	Collin Raye	Male Vocalist of the Year	Nominated
1997	Collin Raye	Male Vocalist of the Year	Nominated
1998	Collin Raye	Male Vocalist of the Year	Nominated
