= Karen Taylor-Good =

American singer-songwriter

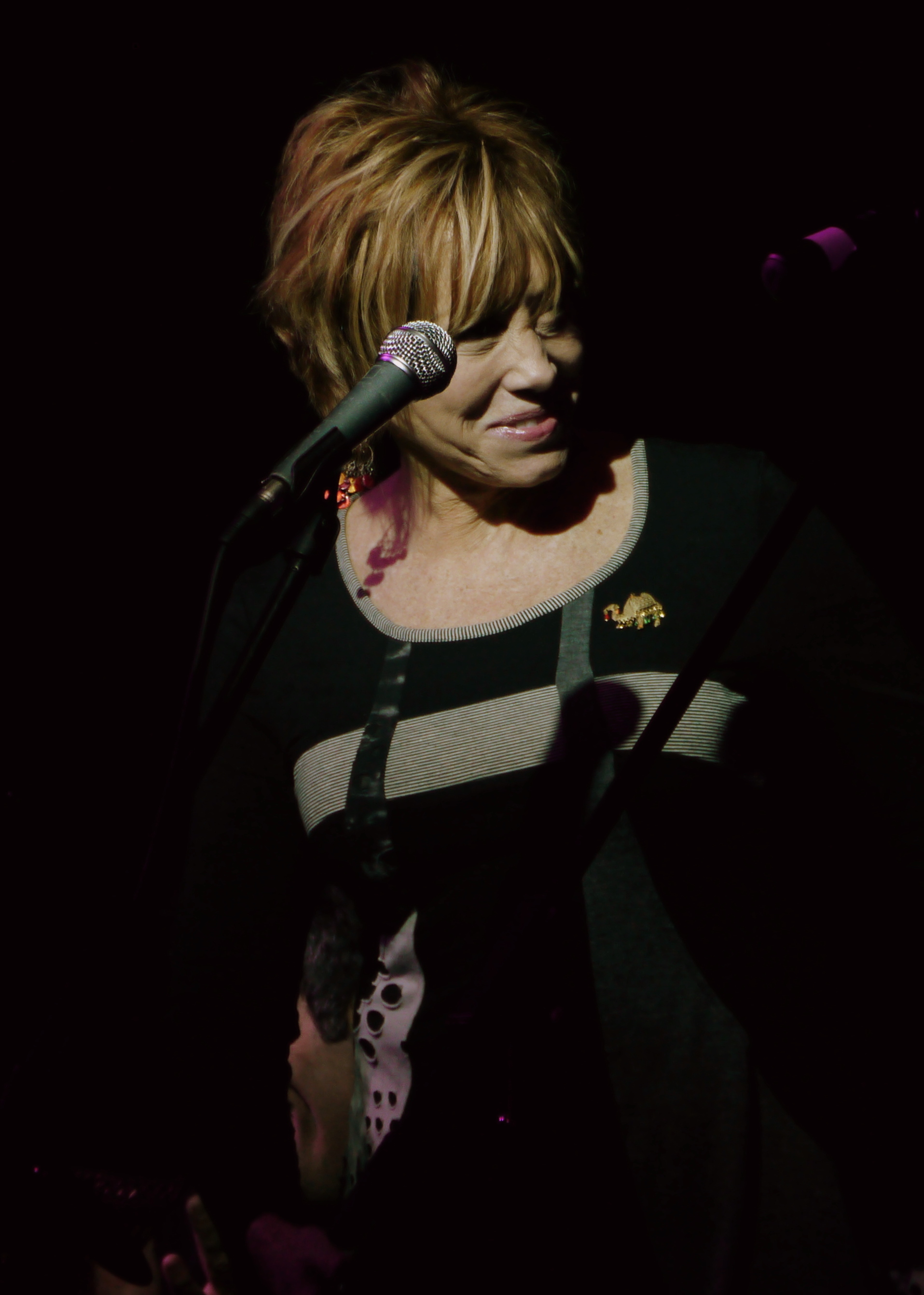
- Karen Taylor-Good performing at the 2012 Posi Awards in Orlando, Fl

Background information
- Born: Karen Berke
- Origin: El Paso, Texas, U.S.
- Genres: Country
- Occupations: Singer-songwriter, author, speaker
- Instrument: Vocals
- Years active: 1982-present
- Labels: Mesa; Song Guru Music
- Website: Official website

Karen Taylor-Good (born Karen Berke in El Paso, Texas) is an American singer-songwriter, and one half of the duo StoweGood. Taylor-Good and her then-husband, Bill Taylor, started the Mesa Records label in 1982. Her first single, "Diamond in the Rough," reached the Top 40 on the Billboard Hot Country Singles chart early that year. Taylor-Good was nominated for Best New Female Vocalist at the 1984 Academy of Country Music Awards. After Mesa Records folded in 1986, she sang jingles for Taco Bell, United Airlines and Peter Pan Peanut Butter.

Taylor-Good became a Warner/Chappell Music songwriter in 1992. She wrote Top 5 songs for Patty Loveless ("How Can I Help You Say Goodbye") and Collin Raye ("Not That Different"). In 1996, she was named SESAC Songwriter of the Year. Her songs have since been recorded by Diamond Rio, Laura Branigan and Melissa Manchester.

She wrote a book, On Angel's Wings, and has produced eight CDs of her original material. Taylor-Good has presented her "musical keynotes" to many groups, including The American Business Women's Association, The National Hospice Foundation, and Lions Clubs International.

In 2011, Karen became part of the songwriting/performing duo, StoweGood, with author, hit songwriter, cancer survivor & sister-from-another-mister, Stowe Dailey. Stowe & Karen have written many, many tear and laugh-inducing songs which are available on their two studio albums, "Love Lives On" and "Beautiful Brokenness" and on their YouTube channel, https://www.youtube.com/channel/UC1cWSjUfI3NKfi8hZSOfoRQ. They share concerts and facilitate healing retreats across the US, Canada, Mexico, Ireland and the UK.

As of 2020, Karen is living in Nashville with her husband of 38 years, Dennis Good, and her daughter Rachael Good.

== Discography ==
=== Albums ===
Year	Album	US Country	Label
1984	Karen	63	Mesa
1994	One Mile Apart	—	K T Good Music
2001	On Angel's Wings	—	Scream
2006	Perfect Work of Art	—	Insight
2006	Song Guru	—	Insight
2006	How Many Women	—	Insight

=== Singles ===
Year	Single	US Country	Album
1982	"Diamond in the Rough"	38	Karen
1982	"Country Boy's Song"	67	Karen
1982	"I'd Rather Be Nothing with You"	62	Karen
1983	"Tenderness Place"	42	Karen
1983	"Don't Call Me"	62	Karen
1984	"Handsome Man"	62	Karen
1984	"We Just Gotta Dance"	66	singles only
1985	"Starlite"	61	singles only
1985	"Up On Your Love"	57	singles only
1986	"Come in Planet Earth (Are You Listenin')"	79	singles only

== Singles written by Taylor-Good ==
Year	Single	Artist
1994	"How Can I Help You Say Goodbye"	Patty Loveless
1995	"Not That Different"	Collin Raye
1998	"Party On"	Neal McCoy
1998	"How Do I Let Go"	Lisa Brokop
