= Joe Chemay =

American bassist and background singer

- Born: Joseph Chemay
- Genres: Rock; country
- Occupation: Musician
- Instruments: Bass guitar; vocals
- Years active: 1980–present

Joseph Chemay is an American bassist and backing vocalist, known for his recording session work.

== Biography ==
Chemay started out working as a session and touring support musician in Los Angeles, but moved to Nashville in 1989.

Chemay has worked with Elton John, Shania Twain, Bill Medley, Peter Cetera, Lionel Richie, Christopher Cross, the Beach Boys, Leon Russell, Michael Nesmith, and others.

In 1980 and 1981, Chemay participated in Pink Floyd's The Wall Tour, providing backing vocals. Chemay also was a member of Roger Waters' Bleeding Heart Band, staging a 1990 production of The Wall.

In 2006, Chemay formed the Trifectone Music Group with Biff Watson and Ed Seay to write, develop and produce commercial music.

== Discography ==
=== Solo recordings ===
- 2007: Unformattable (Trifectone Music Group)

=== With the Joe Chemay Band ===
- 1981: The Riper the Finer (Unicorn Records), "Proud" #68, US Hot 100

=== Also appears on ===
==== 1976–1979 ====
- 1976: Elton John - Blue Moves (MCA / Rocket)
- 1977: Eric Carmen - Boats Against the Current (Arista)
- 1977: Bruce Johnston - Going Public (Columbia)
- 1977: Helen Reddy - Ear Candy (Capitol)
- 1977: Dennis Wilson - Pacific Ocean Blue (Caribou)
- 1978: Eric Carmen - Change of Heart (Arista)
- 1978: Michael Nesmith - Live at the Palais (Pacific Arts)
- 1978: Leon Russell - Americana (Paradise)
- 1978: Tanya Tucker - TNT (MCA)
- 1978: Nigel Olsson - Nigel Olsson (Columbia)
- 1979: The Beach Boys - L.A. (Light Album) ([Caribou / Brother)
- 1979: Michael Nesmith - Infinite Rider on the Big Dogma (Pacific Arts)
- 1979: Nigel Olsson - Nigel (Bang)
- 1979: Pink Floyd - The Wall (Columbia)
- 1979: Geno Washington - That's Why Hollywood Loves Me (DJM)

==== 1980–1984 ====
- 1980: Elton John - 21 at 33 (MCA)
- 1980: Leon Russell - Life and Love (Warner Bros.)
- 1980: Toby Beau - If You Believe (RCA)
- 1981: Karla DeVito - Is This a Cool World or What? (Epic)
- 1981: Tom Johnston - Still Feels Good (Warner Bros.)
- 1981: Kenny Rogers - Share Your Love (Liberty)
- 1982: Laura Branigan - Branigan (Atlantic)
- 1982: Tom Jones - Country (Mercury)
- 1982: Juice Newton - Quiet Lies (Capitol)
- 1982: Eddie Rabbitt - Radio Romance
- 1982: Lionel Richie - Lionel Richie (Motown)
- 1982: Kenny Rogers - Love Will Turn You Around (Liberty)
- 1982: David Roberts - All Dressed Up (Elektra)
- 1983: Lionel Richie - Can't Slow Down (Motown)
- 1983: Kenny Rogers - We've Got Tonight (Liberty)
- 1984: Laura Branigan - Self Control (Atlantic)
- 1984: Flashbeagle (Disneyland Records)
- 1984: Evelyn "Champagne" King - So Romantic (RCA)
- 1984: Smokey Robinson - Essar (Tamla)
- 1984: Kenny Rogers - What About Me? (RCA Victor)
- 1984: Kenny Rogers and Dolly Parton - Once Upon a Christmas (RCA Victor)

==== 1985–1989 ====
- 1985: Christopher Cross - Every Turn of the World (Warner Bros.)
- 1985: Kenny Rogers - The Heart of the Matter (RCA)
- 1985: Sheila Walsh - Don't Hide Your Heart (Sparrow)
- 1985: Juice Newton - Old Flame (RCA)
- 1986: Lionel Richie - Dancing on the Ceiling (Motown)
- 1987: Duane Eddy - Duane Eddy (Capitol)
- 1987: Julio Iglesias - Un hombre solo (CBS)
- 1987: Richard Marx - Richard Marx (Manhattan)
- 1987: Roy Orbison - In Dreams: The Greatest Hits (Virgin)
- 1988: Christopher Cross - Back of My Mind (Reprise)
- 1989: Animotion - Animotion (Room to Move) (Polydor)
- 1989: Barry Manilow - Barry Manilow (Arista)
- 1989: Stan Ridgway - Mosquitos (I.R.S.)
- 1989: Stephen Bishop - Bowling in Paris (Atlantic)
- 1989: Kenny Rogers - Something Inside So Strong (Reprise)

==== 1990–1994 ====
- 1990: George Strait - Livin' It Up (MCA)
- 1990: Roger Waters - The Wall – Live in Berlin (Mercury)
- 1990: Kenny Rogers - Love Is Strange (Reprise)
- 1991: Collin Raye - All I Can Be (Epic)
- 1991: George Strait - Chill of an Early Fall (MCA)
- 1992: Holly Dunn - Getting It Dunn (Warner Bros.)
- 1992: Michael Nesmith - Tropical Campfires (Pacific Arts)
- 1992: Collin Raye - In This Life (Epic)
- 1992: George Strait - Holding My Own (MCA)
- 1992: Pam Tillis - Homeward Looking Angel (Arista)
- 1992: Joy Lynn White - Between Midnight & Hindsight (Lucky Dog / Epic)
- 1993: Christopher Cross - Rendezvous (Geronimo)
- 1993: Martina McBride - The Time Has Come (RCA)
- 1993: Bill Miller - The Red Road (Reprise)
- 1993: Kenny Rogers: If Only My Heart Had a Voice (Giant)
- 1994: Martina McBride - The Way That I Am (RCA)
- 1994: Michael Nesmith - The Garden (Rio)
- 1994: Collin Raye - Extremes (Epic)
- 1994: Michelle Wright - The Reasons Why (Arista)

==== 1995–1999 ====
- 1995: Deana Carter - Did I Shave My Legs for This? (Capitol Nashville)
- 1995: Ty Herndon - What Mattered Most (Epic)
- 1995: Martina McBride - Wild Angels (RCA)
- 1995: Collin Raye - I Think About You (Epic)
- 1996: James Bonamy - What I Live to Do (Epic)
- 1996: Ty Herndon - Living in a Moment (Epic)
- 1996: Engelbert Humperdinck - After Dark (Core)
- 1996: Reba McEntire - What If It's You (MCA Nashville)
- 1996: Collin Raye - Christmas: The Gift (Epic)
- 1996: Ricochet - Ricochet (Columbia)
- 1996: Kevin Sharp - Measure of a Man (Asylum)
- 1996: Chely Wright - Right in the Middle of It (Polygram)
- 1996: Michelle Wright - For Me It's You (Arista Nashville)
- 1996: Reba McEntire - The Secret of Giving: A Christmas Collection (MCA)
- 1997: Sherrié Austin - Words (Arista Nashville)
- 1997: Jan Berry - Second Wave (One Way)
- 1997: James Bonamy - Roots and Wings (Epic)
- 1997: Emilio - It's On the House (Capitol Nashville)
- 1997: Martina McBride - Evolution (RCA)
- 1997: Shania Twain - Come On Over (Mercury)
- 1997: Sherrié Austin - Love in the Real World (Arista Nashville)
- 1998: Deana Carter - Everything's Gonna Be Alright (Capitol Nashville)
- 1998: Dixie Chicks - Wide Open Spaces (Monument)
- 1998: Ty Herndon - Big Hopes (Epic)
- 1998: Martina McBride - White Christmas (RCA)
- 1998: Collin Raye - The Walls Came Down (Epic)
- 1998: Lionel Richie - Time (Mercury)
- 1998: Kevin Sharp - Love Is (Asylum)
- 1998: Daryle Singletary - Ain't It the Truth (Giant)
- 1998: Faith Hill - Faith (Faith Hill album) (Warner Bros.)
- 1998: Pam Tillis - Every Time (Arista Nashville)
- 1998: The Wilkinsons - Nothing but Love (Giant)
- 1998: Olivia Newton-John - Back with a Heart (Festival)
- 1999: Paul Brandt - That's the Truth (Warner / Reprise)
- 1999: Ty Herndon - Steam (Epic)
- 1999: Lace - Lace (143)
- 1999: Martina McBride - Emotion (RCA)
- 1999: Michael Nesmith - Live at the Britt Festival (Cooking Vinyl)

==== 2000–present ====
- 2000: Clay Davidson - Unconditional (Capitol)
- 2000: Marshall Dyllon - Enjoy the Ride (Dreamcatcher)
- 2000: The Kinleys - II (Epic)
- 2000: Neal McCoy - 24-7-365 (Giant)
- 2000: Pink Floyd - Is There Anybody Out There? The Wall Live 1980–81 (EMI)
- 2000: Collin Raye - Counting Sheep (Sony)
- 2000: Collin Raye - Tracks (Epic)
- 2000: Daryle Singletary - Now and Again (Audium Entertainment)
- 2000: The Wilkinsons - Here and Now (Giant)
- 2001: John Anderson - Nobody's Got It All (Columbia)
- 2001: Tammy Cochran - Tammy Cochran (Epic)
- 2001: Carolyn Dawn Johnson - Room With a View (Arista)
- 2001: Georgia Middleman - Endless Possibilities (Giant)
- 2001: Charlie Robison - Step Right Up (Lucky Dog / Sony)
- 2002: Tammy Cochran - Life Happened (Epic / Sony)
- 2003: Billy Gilman - Music Through Heartsongs: Songs Based on the Poems of Mattie J.T. Stepanek (Epic)
- 2003: Kenny Rogers - Back to the Well (Dreamcatcher)
- 2003: Hank Williams, Jr. - I'm One of You (Curb)
- 2005: Billy Gilman - Everything and More (Image Entertainment)
- 2005: The Wilkinsons - Highway (Open Road Recordings)
- 2006: Jeff Bates - Leave the Light On (RCA)
- 2006: Billy Gilman - Billy Gilman (Image)
- 2006: Steve Holy - Brand New Girlfriend (Curb)
- 2006: Michelle Wright - Everything and More (Icon)
- 2007: Kevin Fowler - Bring It On (Equity)
- 2007: The Wilkinsons - Home (ABC / Universal)
- 2009: Luke Bryan - Doin' My Thing (Capitol Nashville)
- 2009: Billy Ray Cyrus - Southern Rain (Monument)
- 2009: Hank Williams, Jr. - 127 Rose Avenue (Curb)
- 2010: Matt King - Hard Country (Atlantic Nashville)
- 2014: Michael Nesmith - Movies of the Mind (Pacific Arts)
