= Billy Joe Walker Jr. =

American singer-songwriter (1952–2017)

- Also known as: Billy Walker Jr.
- Born: February 29, 1952; Midland, Texas, U.S.
- Died: July 25, 2017 (aged 65) Kerrville, Texas, U.S.
- Genres: Country; new-age
- Occupations: Songwriter; session musician; record producer
- Instrument: Guitar
- Years active: 1980s–2017
- Labels: MCA; DGC; Liberty

Billy Joe Walker Jr. (February 29, 1952 – July 25, 2017) was an American songwriter, record producer and recording artist. He composed singles for Eddie Rabbitt, including "I Wanna Dance with You", "That's Why I Fell in Love with You" and "B-B-B-Burnin' Up with Love". He produced the first three albums of Bryan White, and for Pam Tillis, Collin Raye and Travis Tritt. He was also a session musician who played guitar. Between 1987 and 1994, he recorded seven solo albums, all for major labels.

Walker died following a period of declining health on July 25, 2017.

== Discography ==
Title	Details	Peak Chart Positions
Treehouse	Release date: September 21, 1987; Label: MCA Records	—
Painting Music	Release date: July 26, 1989; Label: MCA Records	—
Universal Language	Release date: October 25, 1990; Label: MCA Records	—
The Walk	Release date: May 11, 1992; Label: DGC Records	—
Untitled	Release date: December 23, 1992; Label: DGC Records	—
Warm Front	Release date: July 19, 1993; Label: Liberty Records	10
Life Is Good	Release date: 1994; Label: Liberty Records	—

== Collaborations ==
- Three Way Mirror - Livingston Taylor (1978)
- TNT - Tanya Tucker (1978)
- Never Alone - Amy Grant (1980)
- Share Your Love - Kenny Rogers (1981)
- Juice - Juice Newton (1981)
- It's the World Gone Crazy - Glen Campbell (1981)
- Love Will Turn You Around - Kenny Rogers (1982)
- Changes - Tanya Tucker (1982)
- We've Got Tonight - Kenny Rogers (1983)
- What About Me? - Kenny Rogers (1984)
- Riddles in the Sand - Jimmy Buffett (1984)
- Once Upon a Christmas - Kenny Rogers, Dolly Parton (1984)
- Rhythm & Romance - Rosanne Cash (1985)
- The Heart of the Matter - Kenny Rogers (1985)
- Real Love - Dolly Parton (1985)
- The Things That Matter - Vince Gill (1985)
- They Don't Make Them Like They Used To - Kenny Rogers (1986)
- King's Record Shop - Rosanne Cash (1987)
- Still Within the Sound of My Voice - Glen Campbell (1987)
- Little Love Affairs - Nanci Griffith (1988)
- Light Years - Glen Campbell (1988)
- Walkin' in the Sun - Glen Campbell (1990)
- All I Can Be - Collin Raye (1991)
- Pocket Full of Gold - Vince Gill (1991)
- In This Life - Collin Raye (1992)
- Can't Run from Yourself - Tanya Tucker (1992)
- Shania Twain - Shania Twain (1993)
- Soon - Tanya Tucker (1993)
- Extremes - Collin Raye (1994)
- When Love Finds You - Vince Gill (1994)
- Healing Hands of Time - Willie Nelson (1994)
- Storm in the Heartland - Billy Ray Cyrus (1994)
- Wild Angels - Martina McBride (1995)
- Fire to Fire - Tanya Tucker (1995)
- I Think About You - Collin Raye (1995)
- Jewel of the South - Rodney Crowell (1995)
- It Matters to Me - Faith Hill (1995)
- High Lonesome Sound - Vince Gill (1996)
- Christmas: The Gift - Collin Raye (1996)
- Evolution - Martina McBride (1997)
- Complicated - Tanya Tucker (1997)
- The Walls Came Down - Collin Raye (1998)
- The Other Side - Billy Ray Cyrus (2003)
- These Days - Vince Gill (2006)
