= 1999 in country music =

This is a list of notable events in country music that took place in the year 1999.

== Events ==
- March 6 — George Jones, in the midst of a comeback this year, is seriously injured when he crashed his Lexus into a bridge. It is later revealed that alcohol was a factor in the accident, and he pleaded guilty to drunk driving charges.
- June — Comedian Jeff Foxworthy debuts his syndicated radio countdown show, "The Foxworthy Countdown." The radio show would end ten years later.
- September 4 — Lonestar's hit, "Amazed", spends its eighth week at No. 1 on the Billboard magazine Hot Country Singles & Tracks chart, becoming the first song to do so since Jack Greene's 1966 hit, "There Goes My Everything." In several other trade magazines, including Radio & Records, "Amazed" reigns for nine weeks, which made it the longest-lasting Number One single since 1966's "Almost Persuaded" by David Houston. By year's end, "Amazed" is gaining popularity on CHR and adult contemporary stations (in re-mixed versions, which excised the steel guitar).
- September 22 - Alan Jackson sings the chorus of George Jones' "Choices" in the middle of his performance of "Pop a Top" on the Country Music Association Awards broadcast, after TV producers required that Jones perform an abridged version, in which he refused and boycotted the show. The performance has become one of the best and most memorable moments in CMA history.
- September 28 - Garth Brooks releases In the Life of Chris Gaines, a compilation album of Brooks' alter ego, fictional Australian rock star Chris Gaines. The album was intended to be the soundtrack to a film called The Lamb, however the film was never filmed, due to financial and management problems. The album received disappointing sales in comparison to Brooks' other albums.

== Top hits of the year ==
=== Singles released by American artists ===
US	CAN	Single	Artist	Reference
8	16	All Things Considered	Yankee Grey	
1	1	Amazed	Lonestar	
4	1	Anyone Else	Collin Raye	
1	1	Breathe	Faith Hill	
3	5	Busy Man	Billy Ray Cyrus	
19	22	By the Book	Michael Peterson	
21	8	Can't Get Enough	Patty Loveless	
12	1	Crazy Little Thing Called Love	Dwight Yoakam	
6	1	Drive Me Wild	Sawyer Brown	
2	1	For a Little While	Tim McGraw	
6	27	For You I Will	Aaron Tippin	
3	1	God Must Have Spent a Little More Time on You	Alabama	
4	2	Gone Crazy	Alan Jackson	
26	18	The Greatest	Kenny Rogers	
5	18	Hands of a Working Man	Ty Herndon	
1	5	He Didn't Have to Be	Brad Paisley	
15	11	Hello L.O.V.E.	John Michael Montgomery	
13	7	Hillbilly Shoes	Montgomery Gentry	
4	4	Hold On to Me	John Michael Montgomery	
2	8	Home to You	John Michael Montgomery	
1	1	How Forever Feels	Kenny Chesney	
5	2	I Can't Get Over You	Brooks & Dunn	
1	1	I Don't Want to Miss a Thing	Mark Chesnutt	
1	1	I Love You	Martina McBride	
10	2	I'll Go Crazy	Andy Griggs	
10	6	I'll Still Love You More	Trisha Yearwood	
2	1	I'll Think of a Reason Later	Lee Ann Womack	
3	10	I'm Already Taken	Steve Wariner	
17	37	I'm Leaving	Aaron Tippin	
14	8	Keepin' Up	Alabama	
2	2	Lesson in Leavin'	Jo Dee Messina	
19	21	Lightning Does the Work	Chad Brock	
3	7	Little Good-Byes	SHeDAISY	
3	4	Little Man	Alan Jackson	
5	11	Lonely and Gone	Montgomery Gentry	
12	13	Love Ain't Like That	Faith Hill	
19	25	Make Up in Love	Doug Stone	
16	24	A Man Ain't Made of Stone	Randy Travis	
17	24	Maybe Not Tonight	Sammy Kershaw & Lorrie Morgan	
4	1	Meanwhile	George Strait	
15	6	Missing You	Brooks & Dunn	
6	10	A Night to Remember	Joe Diffie	
1	4	No Place That Far	Sara Evans	
12	11	(Now You See Me) Now You Don't	Lee Ann Womack	
7	5	One Honest Heart	Reba McEntire	
3	10	Ordinary Life	Chad Brock	
24	8	Ordinary Love	Shane Minor	
1	1	Please Remember Me	Tim McGraw	
6	2	Pop a Top	Alan Jackson	
6	1	Powerful Thing	Trisha Yearwood	
2	3	Ready to Run	Dixie Chicks	
1	1	Right on the Money	Alan Jackson	
4	2	The Secret of Life	Faith Hill	
16	35	She's Always Right	Clay Walker	
7	18	She's in Love	Mark Wills	
1	1	Single White Female	Chely Wright	
20	8	Slave to the Habit	Shane Minor	
19	23	Somebody's Out There Watching	The Kinleys	
1	1	Something Like That	Tim McGraw	
2	7	Spirit of a Boy, Wisdom of a Man	Randy Travis	
1	1	Stand Beside Me	Jo Dee Messina	
18	19	Steam	Ty Herndon	
16	20	Stranger in My Mirror	Randy Travis	
4	10	There You Have It	BlackHawk	
17	10	This Heartache Never Sleeps	Mark Chesnutt	
6	4	Tonight the Heartache's on Me	Dixie Chicks	
2	5	Two Teardrops	Steve Wariner	
2	1	Unbelievable	Diamond Rio	
4	2	What Do You Say to That	George Strait	
2	6	Whatever You Say	Martina McBride	
1	1	When I Said I Do	Clint Black with Lisa Hartman Black	
12	11	Who Needs Pictures	Brad Paisley	
1	4	Wish You Were Here	Mark Wills	
9	7	With You	Lila McCann	
1	1	Write This Down	George Strait	
1	5	Wrong Again	Martina McBride	
6	6	Wrong Night	Reba McEntire	
1	1	You Had Me from Hello	Kenny Chesney	
36	19	You Still Shake Me	Deana Carter	
1	1	You Were Mine	Dixie Chicks	
2	11	You Won't Ever Be Lonely	Andy Griggs	
2	7	You're Beginning to Get to Me	Clay Walker	

=== Singles released by Canadian artists ===
US	CAN	Single	Artist	Reference
—	9	Ain't Nobody Like You	Patricia Conroy	
—	8	All My Life	Jim Witter	
—	14	Back in Your Life	Julian Austin	
—	8	Better Off Broken	Lisa Brokop	
—	9	Bit by Bit	John Landry	
—	6	Blue Horizon	Farmer's Daughter	
50	3	Boy Oh Boy	The Wilkinsons	
6	1	Come On Over	Shania Twain	
—	8	Direction of Love	Patricia Conroy	
—	17	Easy as 1, 2, 3	The Spurs	
12	2	Everytime I Cry	Terri Clark	
15	1	Fly (The Angel Song)	The Wilkinsons	
—	9	Forever in Love	Shirley Myers with Duane Steele	
—	15	Freeway	Farmer's Daughter	
—	20	How Do I Get There from Her	George Fox	
70	19	I Already Fell	Gil Grand	
65	7	I Want a Man	Lace	
—	19	I Wish She Was Mine	Colin Amey	
38	13	It's a Beautiful Thing	Paul Brandt	
—	12	Ivey's Wall	Bruce Guthro	
—	10	Jumpin' Right In	Jim Witter	
—	9	Keep On Dreaming	Prairie Oyster	
—	16	Leslie's Wedding Day	Joel Feeney	
4	2	Man! I Feel Like a Woman!	Shania Twain	
—	12	Nothing but Love (Standing in the Way)	The Wilkinsons	
—	9	Running Away with You	Thomas Wade	
—	15	She Ain't Gonna Cry	Joel Feeney	
—	14	She'll Find Someone to Love Her	Jamie Warren	
—	19	She's Sittin' Pretty	Reese Klaiber	
—	10	Shiver 'n' Shake	Rick Tippe	
67	6	Stuff That Matters	Tara Lyn Hart	
—	9	Sure Fire Love	Sean Hogan	
8	2	That Don't Impress Me Much	Shania Twain	
47	1	That's the Truth	Paul Brandt	
—	7	There You Were	John Landry	
—	18	There's More Where That Came From	Jason McCoy	
—	19	Tired of Leavin'	Sean Hogan	
—	12	Triple Threat	Rick Tippe	
47	15	Unsung Hero	Terri Clark	
—	10	What a Woman Wants to Hear	Jamie Warren	
—	12	Who Needs the Moon	Chad Klinger	
—	12	Wild Wild West	Chris Cummings	
13	1	You've Got a Way	Shania Twain	

== Top new album releases ==
US	CAN	Album	Artist	Record label
18		16 Biggest Hits	Johnny Cash	Columbia
17		20 Greatest Hits	Chris LeDoux	Capitol Nashville
	21	444	Charlie Major	Dead Reckoning
69	3	A&E Biography	Kenny Rogers	Capitol Nashville
2	2	Always Never the Same	George Strait	MCA Nashville
26	10	The Austin Sessions	Kris Kristofferson	Atlantic
	15	The Best of Farmer's Daughter	Farmer's Daughter	Universal
1	1	Breathe	Faith Hill	Warner Bros.
6		Classics	Patty Loveless	Epic
30	8	CMT All Access – Girls Night Out	Sara Evans, Martina McBride, Mindy McCready & Lorrie Morgan	RCA Nashville
5	8	Cold Hard Truth	George Jones	Asylum
	5	Country Heat 2000	Various Artists	BMG
7	7	D'lectrified	Clint Black	RCA Nashville
10	9	Drive Me Wild	Sawyer Brown	Curb
3	5	Emotion	Martina McBride	RCA Nashville
5	5	Everywhere We Go	Kenny Chesney	BNA
1	1	Fly	Dixie Chicks	Monument
5	5	Forget About It	Alison Krauss	Rounder
1		Garth Brooks and the Magic of Christmas	Garth Brooks	Capitol Nashville
24		The Grass Is Blue	Dolly Parton	Blue Eye
17		Greatest Bits	Jeff Foxworthy	Warner Bros.
	2	Greatest Hits	Chris Gaines	Capitol
	12	The Greatest Hits Collection	Michelle Wright	Arista
24		Heart Shaped World	Jessica Andrews	DreamWorks Nashville
16	11	Home to You	John Michael Montgomery	Atlantic
13		How Big a Boy Are Ya? Volume 5	Roy D. Mercer	Virgin Nashville
16		How Big a Boy Are Ya? Volume 6	Roy D. Mercer	Virgin Nashville
9	8	How Do You Like Me Now?!	Toby Keith	DreamWorks Nashville
7		How Lucky I Am	Bryan White	Asylum
6	6	I Don't Want to Miss a Thing	Mark Chesnutt	Decca Nashville
17	13	I'm Not So Tough	Mindy McCready	BNA
21		In Spite of Ourselves	John Prine	Oh Boy
11		It's Christmas Time	Elvis Presley	RCA
20		It's About Time	Tracy Byrd	RCA Nashville
70	14	It's About Time	Julie Reeves	Virgin Nashville
5		Keepers: Greatest Hits	Tracy Byrd	MCA Nashville
17	27	Keith Urban	Keith Urban	Capitol Nashville
	17	Lace	Lace	143
10	5	Last Chance for a Thousand Years: Dwight Yoakam's Greatest Hits from the 90's	Dwight Yoakam	Reprise
1	2	LeAnn Rimes	LeAnn Rimes	Curb
24	21	The Life of the Party	Neal McCoy	Giant
7	14	Live in Texas	Lyle Lovett	MCA Nashville
5	23	Live, Laugh, Love	Clay Walker	Giant
3	2	Lonely Grill	Lonestar	BNA
14		Love in the Real World	Sherrié Austin	Arista Nashville
15	11	A Man Ain't Made of Stone	Randy Travis	DreamWorks Nashville
7		Maybe Not Tonight	Sammy Kershaw	Mercury Nashville
10		Merry Christmas Wherever You Are	George Strait	MCA Nashville
9		More...	Trace Adkins	Capitol Nashville
19	14	The Mountain	Steve Earle & Del McCoury Band	E-Squared
8		My Heart	Lorrie Morgan	BNA
	7	New Country 6	Various Artists	Warner
23	25	A Night to Remember	Joe Diffie	Epic
4		Party Doll and Other Favorites	Mary Chapin Carpenter	Columbia
63	21	The Pilgrim	Marty Stuart	MCA Nashville
1	2	A Place in the Sun	Tim McGraw	Curb
60	21	Play	David Ball	Warner Bros.
24		Ride with Bob	Asleep at the Wheel	DreamWorks Nashville
10		The Secret of Giving: A Christmas Collection	Reba McEntire	MCA Nashville
6	8	She Rides Wild Horses	Kenny Rogers	Dreamcatcher
15	16	Single White Female	Chely Wright	MCA Nashville
9	13	Smoke Rings in the Dark	Gary Allan	MCA Nashville
5	9	So Good Together	Reba McEntire	MCA Nashville
5	10	Something in the Air	Lila McCann	Asylum
	7	Stampede Country	Various Artists	Sony
14		Steam	Ty Herndon	Epic
21		Stormy	Hank Williams, Jr.	Curb
45	13	Super Colossal Smash Hits of the 90's: The Best of The Mavericks	The Mavericks	Mercury Nashville
21		Superstar Country Hits	Various Artists	UTV
10	4	Tattoos & Scars	Montgomery Gentry	Columbia
56	1	That's the Truth	Paul Brandt	Reprise
6	6	Tight Rope	Brooks & Dunn	Arista Nashville
4	4	Trio II	Dolly Parton, Linda Ronstadt & Emmylou Harris	Asylum
5	5	Twentieth Century	Alabama	RCA Nashville
6	6	Two Teardrops	Steve Wariner	Capitol Nashville
2	4	Under the Influence	Alan Jackson	Arista Nashville
41	19	Untamed	Yankee Grey	Monument
6		Western Wall: The Tucson Sessions	Linda Ronstadt & Emmylou Harris	Asylum
4	6	What a Wonderful World	Anne Murray	StraightWay
6	4	The Whole SHeBANG	SHeDAISY	Lyric Street
13	13	Who Needs Pictures	Brad Paisley	Arista Nashville
43	12	Wildest Dreams	John Berry	Lyric Street
15	11	You Won't Ever Be Lonely	Andy Griggs	RCA Nashville

=== Other top albums ===
US	CAN	Album	Artist	Record label
47		16 Biggest Hits	Roy Orbison	Monument
65		20th Century Masters: The Millennium Collection	Conway Twitty	MCA Nashville
31		All-Star Country Christmas	Various Artists	Hip-O
46		Ancient Tones	Ricky Skaggs	Skaggs Family
32		Being Human	Michael Peterson	Reprise
50		Best of Country: 16 Original Country Hits	Various Artists	Madacy
37		Chad Brock	Chad Brock	Warner Bros.
29		Classic Country 1970–1974	Various Artists	Time Life
30		Classic Country Early '70s	Various Artists	Time Life
30		Classic Country Late '60s	Various Artists	Time Life
34		Closer	Susan Ashton	Capitol Nashville
37		Country Fun	Various Artists	Warner Bros.
	29	Country Hits of the '70s	Various Artists	EMI
63		Deryl Dodd	Deryl Dodd	Columbia
67		Duets Volume 1	Patsy Cline	Mercury Nashville
38		For the Record – 43 Legendary Hits	Merle Haggard	BNA
69		Full Western Dress	The Derailers	Sire
28		Gettin' My Mind Right	Tim Wilson	Capitol Nashville
44		Here's Your Christmas Album	Bill Engvall	Warner Bros.
63		Hits and Highways Ahead	Lee Roy Parnell	Arista Nashville
45		I've Got a Right to Cry	Mandy Barnett	Sire
44		It's a Sorry World	Tim Wilson	Capitol Nashville
53		John Denver Christmas	John Denver	Laserlight
48		Juddmental	Cledus T. Judd	Razor & Tie
72		King of the Hill Soundtrack	Various Artists	Elektra
61		Live at Billy Bob's Texas: Motorcycle Cowboy	Merle Haggard	Smith
72		Live with the Possum	George Jones	Asylum
38		Make Up in Love	Doug Stone	Atlantic
63		The Man in Black – His Greatest Hits	Johnny Cash	Legacy
61		Old Dogs	Old Dogs	Atlantic
73		Revolutions	The Great Divide	Atlantic
39		Ryman Country Homecoming 1	Various Artists	Coming Home
40		Ryman Country Homecoming 2	Various Artists	Coming Home
41		Ryman Country Homecoming 3	Various Artists	Coming Home
65		Soldier of the Cross	Ricky Skaggs & Kentucky Thunder	Skaggs Family
70		South Sixty-Five	South Sixty-Five	Atlantic
74		Steve Austin's Stone Cold Country	Various Artists	Mars
43		Super Hits	Brooks & Dunn	Arista Nashville
44		Super Hits	Alan Jackson	Arista Nashville
73		Suzy Bogguss	Suzy Bogguss	Platinum
	30	Tara Lyn Hart	Tara Lyn Hart	Epic
	29	There Will Come a Day	Shirley Myers	Stony Plain
30		What I Deserve	Kelly Willis	Rykodisc
69		Your Love Amazes Me: A Country Inspirational Collection	Various Artists	MCA Nashville

== Births ==
- May 3 – Ella Langley, rising singer-songwriter of the 2020s ("You Look Like You Love Me")
- November 5 – Tucker Wetmore, country music singer-songwriter of the 2020s ("Wind Up Missin' You")

== Deaths ==
- February 8 – Lulu Belle (born Myrtle Eleanor Cooper), 85, one-half of the 1930s–1940s husband-and-wife duo Lulu Belle and Scotty, later a state Representative in the North Carolina Legislature.
- July 29- Anita Carter, 66, member of the Carter family
- September 30 — Connie Eaton, 49, singer of the 1970s (cancer)
- October 2 — Danny Mayo, 49, writer of hit singles by Alabama, Confederate Railroad, Pirates of the Mississippi, and Tracy Byrd, father of songwriter Aimee Mayo (heart attack)
- December 17 — Rex Allen, 78, "The Arizona Cowboy" and traveling rodeo performer.
- December 20 — Hank Snow, 85, "The Singing Ranger," best known for "I'm Movin' On."

== Hall of Fame inductees ==
=== Bluegrass Music Hall of Fame inductees ===
- Kenny Baker

=== Country Music Hall of Fame inductees ===
- Johnny Bond (1915–1978)
- Dolly Parton (1946–2026)
- Conway Twitty (1933–1993)

=== Canadian Country Music Hall of Fame inductees ===
- Ronnie Prophet
- Walt Grealis

== Major awards ==
=== Grammy Awards ===
- Best Female Country Vocal Performance — "Man! I Feel Like a Woman!", Shania Twain
- Best Male Country Vocal Performance — "Choices", George Jones
- Best Country Performance by a Duo or Group with Vocal — "Ready to Run", Dixie Chicks
- Best Country Collaboration with Vocals — "After the Gold Rush", Emmylou Harris, Dolly Parton and Linda Ronstadt
- Best Country Instrumental Performance — "Bob's Breakdowns", Tommy Allsup, Asleep at the Wheel, Floyd Domino, Larry Franklin, Vince Gill and Steve Wariner
- Best Country Song — "Come on Over", Shania Twain and Robert John "Mutt" Lange
- Best Country Album — Fly, Dixie Chicks
- Best Bluegrass Album — Ancient Tones, Ricky Skaggs & Kentucky Thunder

=== Juno Awards ===
- Best Country Male Artist — Paul Brandt
- Best Country Female Artist — Shania Twain
- Best Country Group or Duo — The Rankins

=== Academy of Country Music ===
- Entertainer of the Year — Shania Twain
- Song of the Year — "Amazed", Marv Green, Aimee Mayo
- Single of the Year — "Amazed", Lonestar
- Album of the Year — Fly, Dixie Chicks
- Top Male Vocalist — Tim McGraw
- Top Female Vocalist — Faith Hill
- Top Vocal Duo or Group — Dixie Chicks
- Top New Male Vocalist — Brad Paisley
- Top New Female Vocalist — Jessica Andrews
- Top New Vocal Duo or Group — Montgomery Gentry
- Video of the Year — "Breathe", Faith Hill (Director: Lili Fini Zanuck)
- Vocal Event of the Year — "When I Said I Do", Clint Black with Lisa Hartman Black

=== ARIA Awards ===
(presented in Sydney on October 12, 1999)

- Best Country Album - The Captain (Kasey Chambers)
- ARIA Hall of Fame - Jimmy Little

=== Canadian Country Music Association ===
- CMT Maple Leaf Foods Fans' Choice Award — Shania Twain
- Male Artist of the Year — Paul Brandt
- Female Artist of the Year — Shania Twain
- Group or Duo of the Year — The Wilkinsons
- SOCAN Song of the Year — "26 Cents", Steve Wilkinson, William Wallace
- Single of the Year — "26 Cents", The Wilkinsons
- Album of the Year — Nothing but Love, The Wilkinsons
- Top Selling Album — Wide Open Spaces, Dixie Chicks
- Video of the Year — "That Don't Impress Me Much", Shania Twain
- Wrangler Rising Star Award — The Wilkinsons
- Vocal/Instrumental Collaboration of the Year — "From This Moment On", Shania Twain and Bryan White

=== Country Music Association ===
- Entertainer of the Year — Shania Twain
- Song of the Year — "This Kiss", Robin Lerner, Annie Roboff and Beth Nielsen Chapman
- Single of the Year — "Wide Open Spaces", Dixie Chicks
- Album of the Year — A Place in the Sun, Tim McGraw
- Male Vocalist of the Year — Tim McGraw
- Female Vocalist of the Year — Martina McBride
- Vocal Duo of the Year — Brooks & Dunn
- Vocal Group of the Year — Dixie Chicks
- Horizon Award — Jo Dee Messina
- Music Video of the Year — "Wide Open Spaces", Dixie Chicks (Director: Thom Oliphant)
- Vocal Event of the Year — "My Kind of Woman, My Kind of Man", Vince Gill and Patty Loveless
- Musician of the Year — Randy Scruggs

=== RPM Big Country Awards ===
- Canadian Country Artist of the Year — Shania Twain
- Best Country Album — Nothing but Love, The Wilkinsons
- Best Country Single — "26 Cents", The Wilkinsons
- Male Artist of the Year — Paul Brandt
- Female Artist of the Year — Shania Twain
- Group of the Year — The Wilkinsons
- Outstanding New Male Artist — Gil Grand
- Outstanding New Female Artist — Stephanie Beaumont
- Outstanding New Group or Duo — The Johner Brothers
- Canadian Country Video — "26 Cents", The Wilkinsons
- Top Country Composer(s) — Bruce Guthro

=== Hollywood Walk of Fame ===
Stars who were honored in 1999

Patsy Cline, Freddy Fender, and Charley Pride

== Other links ==
- Country Music Association
- Inductees of the Country Music Hall of Fame
