= Untamed (Yankee Grey album) =

Studio album by Yankee Grey
- Released: September 21, 1999
- Genre: Country
- Label: Monument
- Producer: Josh Leo; Robert Ellis Orrall; Ronnie Thomas

Yankee Grey chronology
Untamed (1999)	Yankee Grey 2 (2002)

Singles from Untamed
- 1. "All Things Considered" Released: June 7, 1999; 2. "Another Nine Minutes" Released: January 15, 2000

Professional ratings
Review scores
Source	Rating
Allmusic	link
Country Standard Time	link

Untamed is the debut studio album of the American country music band Yankee Grey. It was released in 1999 (see 1999 in country music) on Monument Records Nashville. The album produced three chart singles on the Billboard country charts. In order of release, these were "All Things Considered" at number 8, "Another Nine Minutes" at number 15, and "This Time Around" at number 43. The fourth and final single, which was the title track, failed to chart. By 2000, Yankee Grey were dropped from Monument's roster, and frontman Tim Hunt left due to vocal complications.

== Track listing ==
No.	Title	Writer(s)	Length
1.	"All Things Considered"	Tim Hunt	2:40
2.	"Another Nine Minutes"	Tom Douglas, Billy Crain, Tim Buppert	3:10
3.	"This Time Around"	Hunt	3:57
4.	"I Should've Listened to Me"	Hunt, Steve Bogard, Rick Giles	3:30
5.	"Untamed"	Hunt, Chris Gantry	3:06
6.	"This Ain't It"	Wally Wilson, Paul Nelson, Larry Boone	2:47
7.	"That Would Be Me"	Hunt, Rick Bowles, David Malloy	3:18
8.	"There's Only One"	Joe Caverlee, Jerry Hughes, Kelly Shiver	4:32
9.	"I Know How You Feel"	Hunt, Josh Leo, Robert Ellis Orrall	2:59
10.	"Tell Me Something I Don't Know"	Hunt, Crain	3:05

== Personnel ==
Compiled from liner notes.

Yankee Grey

- Matthew Basford – lead guitar, background vocals
- David Buchanan – bass guitar, background vocals
- Joe Caverlee – fiddle, background vocals
- Kevin Griffin – drums, background vocals
- Jerry Hughes – keyboards, background vocals
- Tim Hunt – rhythm guitar, lead vocals

Additional musicians

- John Catchings - cello on "This Time Around"
- David Hoffner - strings
- Josh Leo - additional electric guitar on "Another Nine Minutes" and "I Know How You Feel"
- Robert Ellis Orrall - background vocals on "I Know How You Feel" and "All Things Considered"
- Joe Perry - slide guitar on "Tell Me Something I Don't Know"
- Tom Roady - percussion
- Biff Watson - acoustic guitar on all tracks except "This Time Around"

Technical

- Ben Fowler - engineering
- Josh Leo - production (all tracks)
- Robert Ellis Orrall - production (all tracks)
- Ronnie Thomas - production ("All Things Considered" only), associate production, mastering
- Hank Williams - mastering

== Chart performance ==
Chart (1999)	Peak position
U.S. Billboard Top Country Albums	41
U.S. Billboard Top Heatseekers	31
Canadian RPM Country Albums	19
