= Nothing but Love (disambiguation) =

Nothing but Love is a 1998 album by The Wilkinsons. It may also refer to:

== Music ==
- Nothing but Love World Tour, a 2009–2010 concert tour by Whitney Houston
- Nothing But Love, a 1919 Broadway musical with a score by Harold Orlob

=== Albums ===
- Nothing but Love, a 2012 album by Brian Free and Assurance
- Nuttin' but Love, a 1994 album by Heavy D & the Boyz
- Nothing but Love, album by Indonesian singer Whizzkid, AMI Awards 2011#Winner and nominees

=== Songs ===
- "Nothing but Love", a song from the 1930 American film, Half Shot at Sunrise
- "Nothing but Love", song by Bobo Jenkins 1955
- "Nothing but Love", song by The Tartans and The Kaddo Strings 1966
- "Nothing but Love", song by John Wesley Ryles 1979
- "Nothing but Love", song by Peter Tosh with Gwen Guthrie 1981
- "Nothing but Love", a 1991 single by American Christian singer, Twila Paris
- "Nothing but Love", a song by The Dells with Billy Valentine, heard in the 1991 film, The Five Heartbeats
- "Nothing but Love", a song from Bump Ahead, a 1993 album by Mr. Big
- "Nothing but Love", a song released with the 1993 single by Tupac Shakur "I Get Around (Tupac Shakur song)"
- "Nothing but Love (Standing in the Way)", a 1998 song by The Wilkinsons
- "Nothing but Love", a 2010 single by Axwell
- "Nothing but Love", a song from the rock band The Gracious Few's 2010 self-titled debut album
- "Nothing but Love", a song from All for You (Titanium album), 2012
- "Nothing but Love", a song from 3 Pears, a 2012 album by Dwight Yoakam
- "Nothing but Love", a song by English rock band James from their 2016 album, "Girl at the End of the World"
- "Nuttin' but Love", a 1994 song by Heavy D & the Boyz
