= 35th Academy of Country Music Awards =

US music awards ceremony in 2000

- Date: May 3, 2000
- Location: Universal Amphitheatre, Los Angeles, California
- Hosted by: Dolly Parton

Highlights
- Most wins: Faith Hill; Lonestar; Dixie Chicks; (2 each)
- Most nominations: Faith Hill; Tim McGraw; Dixie Chicks; (5 each)

Television/radio coverage
- Network: CBS

The 35th Academy of Country Music Awards was held on May 3, 2000, at the Universal Amphitheatre, in Los Angeles, California. The ceremony was hosted by Dolly Parton.

== Winners and nominees ==
Winners are shown in bold.

Entertainer of the Year	Album of the Year
**Shania Twain**; The Dixie Chicks; Faith Hill; Tim McGraw; Sawyer Brown	**Fly — Dixie Chicks**; A Place in the Sun — Tim McGraw; Breathe — Faith Hill; Cold Hard Truth — George Jones; Ride with Bob — Asleep at the Wheel
Top Female Vocalist of the Year	Top Male Vocalist of the Year
**Faith Hill**; Martina McBride; Jo Dee Messina; Shania Twain; Chely Wright	**Tim McGraw**; Alan Jackson; Toby Keith; Collin Raye; George Strait
Top Vocal Duo or Group of the Year	Top Vocal Event of the Year
**Dixie Chicks**; Asleep at the Wheel; Brooks & Dunn; Lonestar; Sawyer Brown	**"When I Said I Do"** — **Clint Black (feat. Lisa Hartman Black)**; "A Country Boy Can Survive" — Chad Brock (feat. Hank Williams Jr. and George Jones); "(God Must Have Spent) A Little More Time on You" — Alabama (feat. NSYNC); "After the Gold Rush" — Dolly Parton, Emmylou Harris, Linda Ronstadt; "My Kind of Woman/My Kind of Man" — Vince Gill and Patty Loveless
Single Record of the Year	Song of the Year
**"Amazed"** — **Lonestar**; "He Didn't Have to Be" — Brad Paisley; "Please Remember Me" — Tim McGraw; "Ready to Run" — Dixie Chicks; "Write This Down" — George Strait	**"Amazed"** — **Aimee Mayo, Chris Lindsey, Marv Green**; "Breathe" — Stephanie Bentley, Holly Lamar; "Choices" — Billy Yates, Mike Curtis; "He Didn't Have to Be" — Brad Paisley, Kelley Lovelace; "Please Remember Me" — Rodney Crowell, Will Jennings
Top New Male Vocalist	Top New Female Vocalist
**Brad Paisley**; Gary Allan; Chad Brock	**Jessica Andrews**; Julie Reeves; Chalee Tennison
Top New Vocal Duo or Group	Video of the Year
**Montgomery Gentry**; SHeDAISY; Yankee Grey	**"Breathe"** — **Faith Hill**; "He Didn't Have to Be" — Brad Paisley; "How Do You Like Me Now?!" — Toby Keith; "Ready to Run" — Dixie Chicks; "Single White Female" — Chely Wright
Pioneer Award
**Tammy Wynette**

== Performers ==
Performer(s)	Song(s)
George Strait; Alan Jackson	"Murder on Music Row"
George Jones	"Choices"
Lonestar	"Amazed"
Gary Allan; Chad Brock; Brad Paisley	Top New Male Vocalist Medley "Lovin' You Against My Will" "Yes!" "He Didn't Have to Be"
Jo Dee Messina	"That's the Way"
Asleep at the Wheel; Billy Gilman	"Roly Poly"
Martina McBride	"Love's the Only House"
Tim McGraw	"Some Things Never Change"
Kenny Chesney	"She Thinks My Tractor's Sexy"
Dolly Parton; Patty Loveless; The Judds; Martina McBride	Tammy Wynette Tribute "Stand by Your Man"
Alan Jackson; Hank Williams Jr.	"The Blues Man"
Jessica Andrews; Julie Reeves; Chalee Tennison	Top New Female Vocalist Medley "Unbreakable Heart" "What I Need" "Just Because She Lives There"
Chely Wright	"Single White Female"
Sawyer Brown	"Perfect World"
Collin Raye	"Couldn't Last a Moment"
Toby Keith	"How Do You Like Me Now?!"
Reba McEntire	"I'll Be"
Faith Hill; Tim McGraw	"Let's Make Love"
Montgomery Gentry; SHeDAISY; Yankee Grey	Top New Vocal Duo or Group Medley "Hillbilly Shoes" "This Woman Needs" "All Things Considered"
Dolly Parton	"Travelin' Prayer"
Clint Black; Lisa Hartman Black	"When I Said I Do"
Wynonna	"Going Nowhere"

== Presenters ==
Presenter(s)	Notes
Catherine Bell; Tracy Lawrence	Top Vocal Duo or Group of the Year
Neal McCoy; Marie Osmond; Ty Herndon	Video of the Year
Tracy Byrd; Mark Wills	Top New Male Vocalist
Mark Chesnutt; Jane Clayson Johnson; Bryan White	Song of the Year
Bellamy Brothers; The Kinleys	Top Vocal Event of the Year
Trisha Yearwood	Presented Cliffie Stone Pioneer Award to Tammy Wynette
Linda Davis; Trace Adkins; Holly Dunn	Top New Female Vocalist
Danni Leigh; Dwight Yoakam	Album of the Year
Bill Engvall; Janie Fricke; Clay Walker	Single Record of the Year
Lee Ann Womack; The Wilkinsons	Top New Vocal Duo or Group
Buck Owens; Dixie Chicks	Top Male Vocalist of the Year
Brooks & Dunn	Top Female Vocalist of the Year
Dolly Parton	Entertainer of the Year
