= All Things Considered (disambiguation) =

All Things Considered is a news program on the American network National Public Radio.

All Things Considered may also refer to:

- All Things Considered (BBC radio show), a religious affairs program on BBC Radio Wales
- "All Things Considered" (song), a song by Yankee Grey
- "All Things Considered", a song by The Mighty Mighty Bosstones from Pay Attention, 2000
- All Things Considered, a book of essays by G. K. Chesterton (published 1908)
- All Things Considered, an English title of the 1963 film À tout prendre
