= I Wanna Fall in Love =

Single by Lila McCann

from the album Lila
- Released: September 1997
- Genre: Country
- Length: 4:19
- Label: Asylum
- Songwriters: Buddy Brock; Mark Spiro
- Producer: Mark Spiro

Lila McCann singles chronology
"Down Came a Blackbird" (1997)	"I Wanna Fall in Love" (1997)	"Almost Over You" (1998)

"I Wanna Fall in Love" is a song written by Buddy Brock and Mark Spiro, and recorded by American country music artist Lila McCann. It was released in September 1997 as the second single from her debut album Lila. The song reached number 3 on the Billboard Hot Country Singles & Tracks chart in February 1998 and number 1 on the RPM Country Tracks chart in Canada.

== Chart performance ==
Chart (1997–1998)	Peak position
Canada Country Singles (RPM)	1
US Hot Country Songs (Billboard)	3

=== Year-end charts ===
Chart (1998)	Position
Canada Country Tracks (RPM)	50
US Country Songs (Billboard)	29
