= Billy Crain =

American songwriter and musician

- Birth name: William Sherwood Crain
- Born: August 9, 1954 (age 70); Nashville, Tennessee, United States
- Genres: Southern rock, rock music, country music
- Occupation(s): Guitarist, songwriter, record producer
- Instrument(s): Guitar, bass guitar, drums, keyboards, vocals
- Years active: 1970–current
- Labels: Sony Music Entertainment, Sony BMG, Epic, MCA
- Website: billycrain.com

William Sherwood Crain (born August 9, 1954 in Nashville, Tennessee) is an American songwriter and musician. He has been a staple performer in the Southern rock scene since the early 1970s. He is the younger brother to former Charlie Daniels Band guitarist Tommy Crain, who died in 2011. He has performed with various artists including The Allman Brothers Band, The Rossington-Collins Band, The Rolling Stones and ZZ Top. In the late 1980s he pursued songwriting and record production. He co-wrote the song "Call It Love" (by Poco) with Ron Guilbeau and Rick Lonow; "It's My Time" by Martina McBride (co-writers Kim Tribble and Tammy Hyler); "Another Nine Minutes" (co-writers Tim Buppert and Tom Douglas); and "Let 'er Rip" by the Dixie Chicks (co-written with Sandy Ramos).

After Henry Paul left the Southern rock band the Outlaws, he recruited Billy Crain to join the Henry Paul Band. Crain remained an important member of the band from 1978 until 1982, collaborating on songwriting, and being the featured lead guitarist. In 2008 Crain would hook up again with Henry Paul, but this time in the reformed Outlaws. This was after the death of longtime founding Outlaw member Hughie Thomasson. For health reasons Crain left the Outlaws in 2013, but not before helping Henry Paul produce the critically acclaimed "It's About Pride" album released in 2012. He has a wife, Sandra Lynn Crain, two daughters, Sarah Crain and Stella Crain, and two sons, John Crain and Dallas Crain.
