= Lila (album) =

Studio album by Lila McCann
- Released: June 17, 1997
- Genre: Country
- Length: 38:10
- Label: Asylum
- Producer: Mark Spiro

Lila McCann chronology
Lila (1997)	Something in the Air (1999)

Singles from Lila
- 1. "Down Came a Blackbird" Released: May 5, 1997; 2. "I Wanna Fall in Love" Released: September 15, 1997; 3. "Almost Over You" Released: February 23, 1998; 4. "Yippy Ky Yay" Released: June 8, 1998

Professional ratings
Review scores
Source	Rating
AllMusic	4/5 stars
Country Standard Time	link
Entertainment Weekly	B− link

Lila is the debut album by American country music singer Lila McCann. Released in 1997 on Asylum Records, the album produced four singles on the Billboard Hot Country Singles & Tracks chart: "Down Came a Blackbird" (#28), "I Wanna Fall in Love" (#3, McCann's highest-charting single), a cover of Sheena Easton's "Almost Over You" (#42) and finally, "Yippy Ky Yay" (#63). The album itself has been certified platinum by the RIAA for U.S. shipments of one million copies, and it was the highest-selling debut album by a country artist in 1997.

== Track listing ==
Lila track listing
No.	Title	Writer(s)	Length
1.	"I Wanna Fall in Love"	Buddy Brock; Mark Spiro	4:19
2.	"Just One Little Kiss"	Greg Barnhill; Kim Carnes	2:50
3.	"Almost Over You"	Jennifer Kimball; Cindy Richardson	3:31
4.	"Down Came a Blackbird"	Micheal Smotherman; Spiro	3:57
5.	"Already Somebody's Lover"	Spiro	3:35
6.	"Changing Faces"	Lila McCann; Spiro	4:07
7.	"Yippy Ky Yay"	Spiro; Andrew Gold	4:07
8.	"I Feel for You"	Brock; Shara Johnson	3:14
9.	"Saddle My Dreams"	Tim Pierce; Spiro	3:28
10.	"A Rain of Angels"	Michael Dulaney; Jannie Littlepage	5:00
Total length:			38:10

== Personnel ==
Adapted from liner notes.

- Mike Brignardello – bass guitar
- Dennis Burnside – piano
- Larry Byrom – acoustic guitar, electric guitar
- Kim Carnes – background vocals (track 2)
- Stuart Duncan – fiddle, mandolin, dobro
- Dan Dugmore – steel guitar and electric dobro (track 2)
- Paul Franklin – steel guitar
- Sonny Garrish – steel guitar
- John Hobbs – piano, keyboards, additional piano and keyboard overdubs (tracks 1, 4, 5, 8)
- Dann Huff – acoustic guitar, electric guitar
- Jana King-Evans – background vocals (track 1)
- Liana Manis – background vocals (track 9)
- Brent Mason – electric guitar
- Lila McCann – lead vocals, background vocals
- Terry McMillan – harmonica (track 5)
- Mark Spiro – background vocals
- Lonnie Wilson – drums

== Charts ==
=== Weekly charts ===
Chart (1997)	Peak position
Canadian Country Albums (RPM)	10
US Billboard 200	86
US Top Country Albums (Billboard)	8
US Heatseekers Albums (Billboard)	1

=== Year-end charts ===
Chart (1997)	Position
US Top Country Albums (Billboard)	52
Chart (1998)	Position
US Top Country Albums (Billboard)	33
