= Down Came a Blackbird (song) =

Single by Lila McCann

from the album Lila
- Released: May 17, 1997
- Genre: Country
- Length: 3:57
- Label: Asylum
- Songwriters: Micheal Smotherman, Mark Spiro
- Producer: Mark Spiro

Lila McCann singles chronology
"Down Came a Blackbird" (1997)	"I Wanna Fall in Love" (1997)

"Down Came a Blackbird" is a song recorded by American country music artist Lila McCann. It was released in May 1997 as her debut single and the first from her album Lila. The song reached number 28 on the Billboard Hot Country Singles & Tracks chart. The song was written by Micheal Smotherman and Mark Spiro.

== Content ==
The song is about a troubled relationship, using a blackbird as a metaphor.

== Critical reception ==
The then-president of Asylum Records said of the song at its release that the song "is starting to look like 'Blue' all over again" but added that "We're hoping radio won't kill this before it has a chance to be a hit".

== Chart performance ==
Chart (1997)	Peak position
US Hot Country Songs (Billboard)	28
Canadian RPM Country Tracks	40
