= Complete (Lila McCann album) =

Studio album by Lila McCann
- Released: June 26, 2001
- Studio: Henson (Hollywood, CA); Sound Kitchen (Franklin, TN); Starstruck Studios (Nashville, TN)
- Genre: Country
- Length: 33:54
- Label: Warner Bros. Nashville
- Producer: David Malloy

Lila McCann chronology
Something in the Air (1999)	Complete (2001)	Super Hits (2002)

Singles from Complete
- 1. "Come a Little Closer" Released: April 16, 2001; 2. "Because of You" Released: July 16, 2001

Complete is the third studio album by American country music artist Lila McCann, released on June 26, 2001, via Warner Bros. Nashville as her sole album with the label following her departure from Asylum Records. The album was released two years following her previous record Something in the Air (1999) in which during that time she graduated high school and began working with new producer David Malloy. Complete is also McCann's final studio album with a major record label and is her only album to not contain any writing credits from her.

Upon release, Complete received mixed reviews, with the content of the album either being received positively or negatively. Two singles were released from the album, namely "Come a Little Closer" and "Because of You". The former failed to reach the top-40 of the US country airplay chart while the latter completely failed to enter the chart at all. The album would peak at number 18 on the US Top Country Albums chart. Following the failures of the two singles, McCann would be dropped by Warner Bros. Nashville.

Two songs on this album would be recorded by other artists. The second single "Because of You" would go on to be recorded by Canadian artist Celine Dion, from which it would be included on limited edition versions of her 2002 studio album A New Day Has Come. The album cut "Mighty Mighty Love" would later be recorded by country artist Ty Herndon for his 2007 studio album Right About Now, in which it would be released as a single.

== Content ==
McCann said in an interview with Radio & Records quote, "Going into the studio this time, I wanted to sing songs that I thought were appropriate for me at this time in my life. I wanted more of a challenge [...] Every time I record a new album, I'm able to go further, because I know more about myself." She also said at the time, "I've grown up in the past three years...My music has changed. It is not so bubble gum. It has taken on a cooler edge, but it's still not beyond my years."

== Singles ==
"Come a Little Closer" was serviced to country radio on April 16, 2001, as the lead single from Complete. Deborah Evans Price of Billboard gave it a favorable review, saying that McCann "displays greater confidence that on her initial outings, but still maintains an appealing girlish exuberance on this up-tempo tune." The track had a promising start, debuting at number 49 on the US Hot Country Songs chart the week of May 5, 2001, becoming the highest debut of the week. This did not translate into chart success however, as the song fizzled out at number 43 on June 2, 2001, spending only 11 weeks in total on the chart. A video, directed by Gerry Wenner, was released to CMT on May 27, 2001, but did little to help the song. The second and final single, "Because of You", was released on July 16, 2001, to airplay. Deborah Evans Price reviewed the song negatively, saying "The lyric is a succession of romantic cliches [...] The production sounds bland and predictable." The song completely failed to enter the US Billboard Hot Country Songs chart, becoming McCann's first single to do so. No more singles were released following this one.

== Critical reception ==
Professional ratings
Review scores
Source	Rating
Allmusic	4/5 stars
Country Standard Time	(not rated)

Complete received mixed reviews from music reviews. Rick Cohoon of AllMusic gave the album a positive review, calling it a more confident and mature record than her previous albums, highlighting "Come a Little Closer" and "She Remembers Love" as standout tracks. A more mixed review came from Dan MacIntosh of Country Standard Time, saying that although she has a "sweet and strong voice," he criticized the content on the album although also praised "She Remembers Love", naming it the highlight. Fred Bronson of Billboard named Complete his 20th favorite album of 2001.

== Commercial performance ==
Complete debuted on the US Billboard Top Country Albums chart the week of July 14, 2001, at number 18 with 10,000 copies sold first week, becoming McCann's first album to miss the top ten of the chart. By the next week, the album had fallen to number 26. The album continued to dip down the chart, falling to number 32, then 33, 37, 43, 48, 49, 53, 59, and then 61. The album spent its final week on the chart at number 72; it spent only 12 weeks in total on the chart. The album also charted on the Billboard 200, debuting at number 152 on July 14, 2001. It spent one more week at number 179 before falling off entirely.

== Track listing ==
Complete track listing
No.	Title	Writer(s)	Length
1.	"Where It Used to Break"	Dave Berg; Rivers Rutherford	2:56
2.	"Come a Little Closer"	Phil Douglas; Tony Marty; Jennifer Sherrill	3:36
3.	"Complete"	Pebe Sebert; Anne Graham	3:45
4.	"Mighty Mighty Love"	Dennis Matkosky; Tim Nichols; Darrell Brown	3:51
5.	"Whisper the Words"	David Malloy; Bruce Roberts; Krystle Warren	4:26
6.	"Like a Rocket"	Julie Burton; Phil O'Donnell; Noah Gordon	2:51
7.	"Is It Just Me"	Greg Johnson; Randy Thomas	3:38
8.	"She Remembers Love"	Liz Hengber; Rob Crosby	4:01
9.	"Lost in Your Love"	Ashley Gorley; Joanna Janét	3:21
10.	"Because of You"	Lisa Scott; Christi Dannemiller; Burt Collins	3:29
Total length:			33:54

== Personnel ==
Taken from the Complete booklet.

- Lila McCann – lead vocals (all)
- Brent Mason – electric guitar (1, 4–7, 9, 10)
- Michael Landau – electric guitar (1, 4, 5, 7, 9, 10)
- Jerry McPherson – electric guitar (2, 3, 6, 8)
- B. James Lowry – acoustic guitar (all)
- Paul Franklin – steel guitar (all)
- Michael Rhodes – bass guitar (all)
- Aubrey Haynie – mandolin (1, 7, 10), fiddle (9)
- Larry Franklin – mandolin (2, 3), fiddle (6, 8)
- Jimmy Nichols – piano, background vocals (all)
- The Nashville String Machine – strings (3, 8)
- Bergen White – string arrangements (3, 8)
- Lonnie Wilson – drums (1, 4, 5, 7, 9, 10)
- Paul Leim – drums (2, 3, 6, 8)
- Eric Darken – percussion (all)
- Stephanie Bentley – background vocals (1–4, 6–10)
- Liana Manis – background vocals (5)
- Melinda Norris – background vocals (7)

== Charts ==
Chart (2001)	Peak position
US Billboard 200	152
US Top Country Albums (Billboard)	18
