= She Went Out for Cigarettes =

Single by Chely Wright

from the album Single White Female
- B-side: "Some Kind of Somethin'"
- Released: May 30, 2000
- Genre: Country
- Length: 4:12
- Label: MCA Nashville
- Songwriters: Ronnie Guilbeau; John McElroy
- Producers: Tony Brown; Buddy Cannon; Norro Wilson

Chely Wright singles chronology
"It Was" (1999)	"She Went Out for Cigarettes" (2000)	"Never Love You Enough" (2001)

"She Went Out for Cigarettes" is a song written by Ronnie Guilbeau and John McElroy and recorded by American country music artist Chely Wright. It was produced by Tony Brown, Buddy Cannon, and Norro Wilson. The song was released on May 30, 2000, as the third and final single from her fourth studio album Single White Female (1999).

The song was a minor success, peaking at number 49 on the Hot Country Songs chart and number 84 on the Canadian RPM Country Tracks chart.

== Critical reception ==
Billboard gave the song a positive review by saying "She possesses a voice that can effectively combine a world -weary strength and vulnerability into a touching concoction. That quality serves her well on this sad, sad tune. Country programmers should find this easy to add to the airwaves."

== Music video ==
The music video for the song was added to CMT's playlists the week of May 8, 2000.

== Commercial performance ==
"She Went Out for Cigarettes" debuted on the US Hot Country Songs the week of June 10, 2000, at number 64. In its fourth week, the song reached its peak position of number 49; it spent eight weeks in total on the chart.

The song debuted on the Canadian RPM the week of July 31, 2000 at number 86. The following week on August 7, it rose to its peak position of number 84. It spent six weeks in total.

== Track listing ==
7" vinyl single
No.	Title	Writer(s)	Length
1.	"She Went Out for Cigarettes"	Ronnie Guilbeau; Jon McElroy	4:12
2.	"Some Kind of Somethin'"	Sunny Ross; Chely Wright	3:59
Total length:			8:11

== Charts ==
Chart (1999–2000)	Peak position
Canada Country Singles (RPM)	84
US Hot Country Songs (Billboard)	49

== Release history ==
Release dates and format(s) for "She Went Out for Cigarettes"
Region	Date	Format(s)	Label(s)	Ref.
United States	May 30, 2000	Country radio	MCA Nashville	
