= Another Nine Minutes =

Single by Yankee Grey

from the album Untamed
- Released: January 15, 2000
- Genre: Country
- Length: 3:10
- Label: Monument
- Songwriters: Tom Douglas; Billy Crain; Tim Buppert
- Producers: Josh Leo; Robert Ellis Orrall

Yankee Grey singles chronology
"All Things Considered" (1999)	"Another Nine Minutes" (2000)	"This Time Around" (2000)

"Another Nine Minutes" is a song written by Tom Douglas, Billy Crain and Tim Buppert and recorded by American country music group Yankee Grey. It was released in January 2000 as the second single from the group's first album, Untamed. The song reached number 15 on the Billboard Hot Country Singles & Tracks chart in May 2000.

== Music video ==
The music video was directed by chris rogers [sic] and premiered in January 2000.

== Chart performance ==
Chart (2000)	Peak position
Canada Country Singles (RPM)	21
US Billboard Hot 100	74
US Hot Country Songs (Billboard)	15

=== Year-end charts ===
Chart (2000)	Position
US Country Songs (Billboard)	57
