= Best Kept Secret (Sheena Easton album) =

Studio album by Sheena Easton
- Released: August 1983
- Recorded: 1983
- Studios: Sunset Sound Factory (Los Angeles, California): Garden Rake Studios (Studio City, California)
- Genre: Pop
- Length: 40:38
- Label: EMI
- Producers: Greg Mathieson; Jay Graydon

Sheena Easton chronology
Madness, Money & Music (1982)	Best Kept Secret (1983)	A Private Heaven (1984)

Singles from Best Kept Secret
- 1. "Telefone (Long Distance Love Affair)" Released: August 1983; 2. "Almost Over You" Released: October 1983; 3. "Devil in a Fast Car" Released: 1984

Professional ratings
Review scores
Source	Rating
AllMusic	link

Best Kept Secret is the fourth album by Scottish singer Sheena Easton. It was released in 1983 on EMI Records. It was her first album to be recorded entirely in the United States, Best Kept Secret was produced by Greg Mathieson, Jay Graydon, and Trevor Veitch.

== Background ==
Easton had planned to collaborate again with Christopher Neil, the London-based producer of her previous three albums, but it had eventuated that she and Neil had disparate ideas regarding her new album's material and style. Easton had also hoped that David Foster, who had produced her interim hit duet with Kenny Rogers, "We've Got Tonight", would produce some solo tracks for her, but Foster's schedule did not permit this. The songs on Best Kept Secret alternated between dance tracks in the Eurodisco style of the recent Laura Branigan hit "Gloria"— which Mathieson/Graydon/Veitch had been responsible for— and ballads. The album's lead single was the dance track "Telefone (Long Distance Love Affair)" which became Easton's third solo hit to reach the US Top Ten with a No. 9 peak on the Billboard Hot 100 and was Grammy nominated. The second single was the ballad "Almost Over You" (No. 25) and another rock track "Devil in a Fast Car" was subsequently issued as a single to reach No. 79.

== Release ==
The album included a cover version of 60s icon Dusty Springfield's classic "Just One Smile" and Australian rock star Doug Parkinson's "Let Sleeping Dogs Lie". French-Canadian singer Véronique Béliveau recorded a cover of "She's In Love (With Her Radio)" in French, entitled "Je suis fidèle" which reached number 1 in Québec in 1983. Best Kept Secret peaked at No. 33 on the Billboard 200 Album Chart, with a chart duration of 38 weeks. Neither the album nor its singles had high chart impact in the UK, Best Kept Secret charting there at No. 99 while "Telefone..." and "Almost Over You" had respective UK peaks of No. 84 and No. 89. In Canada both the Best Kept Secret album and "Telefone..." single were certified Gold by the CRIA.

== Legacy ==
Best Kept Secret was reissued in 2000 on One Way Records, adding the hit duet "We've Got Tonight" with Kenny Rogers. On November 24, 2014, the album was included in an Original Album Series box set in the UK with all of her first five albums with EMI through Warner Music Group. On August 6, 2019, RT Industries released Best Kept Secret and "Telefone" EP on digital download format.

== Track listing ==
Side one

1. "Telefone (Long Distance Love Affair)" (Greg Mathieson, Trevor Veitch) – 3:41
2. "I Like the Fright" (Paul Bliss, Steve Kipner) – 3:49
3. "Almost Over You" (Jennifer Kimball, Cindy Richardson) – 3:41
4. "Devil in a Fast Car" (Kimball, Richardson) – 4:01
5. "Don't Leave Me This Way" (J.P. Pennington) – 4:57

Side two

1. "Let Sleeping Dogs Lie" (Tommy Emmanuel, Kipner) – 4:31
2. "(She's in Love) With Her Radio" (Danny McBride, Mike Roth) – 3:36
3. "Just One Smile" (Randy Newman) – 4:48
4. "Sweet Talk" (Kimball) – 3:39
5. "Best Kept Man" (Chrissy Shefts) – 3:48

CD bonus tracks

11. "Telefone (Long Distance Love Affair)" [Extended] (Greg Mathieson, Trevor Veitch) – 6:11
12. "Wish You Were Here Tonight" (J.Sullins) – 3:58 (Producer: Jay Graydon)
13. "I Don't Need Your Word" (Mike Leeson, Peter Vale) – 3:20 (Producer: Christopher Neil)
14. "We've Got Tonight" with Kenny Rogers (Bob Seger) – 3:50 (Producer: David Foster)
15. "Telefone (Long Distance Love Affair)" [Dance Mix] (Greg Mathieson, Trevor Veitch) – 4:19

== Personnel ==
=== Musicians ===
- Sheena Easton – lead vocals, backing vocals
- Michael Boddicker – synthesizers (1, 4, 5, 7, 9, 10)
- Greg Mathieson – acoustic piano (1, 5), synthesizers (1, 4, 5, 7, 9, 10), arrangements (1, 3–5, 7, 9, 10)
- Paul Bliss – synthesizers (2), drums (2), arrangements (2)
- Steve Kipner – synthesizers (2), drums (2), arrangements (2)
- Steve Porcaro – synthesizers (2, 6)
- Todd McKinney – synthesizer programming (2)
- David Foster – acoustic piano (3)
- Robbie Buchanan – synthesizers (6, 8), synth bass (6), arrangements (6, 8), Fender Rhodes (8)
- Paul Jackson Jr. – guitars (1, 9)
- Jay Graydon – guitars (2, 6, 8)
- Michael Landau – guitars (4, 5, 7, 10)
- Steve Fishell – steel guitar (9)
- Leland Sklar – bass (3–5, 7, 9, 10)
- Nathan East – bass (8)
- Carlos Vega – drums (1, 4, 5, 7, 9, 10)
- John Gilston – Simmons drum programming (2)
- Mike Baird – drums (3, 6, 8)
- Dave Weiderman – Simmons drum programming (6)
- Lenny Castro – percussion (3, 5)
- David Woodford – saxophone (1)
- Gary Herbig – saxophone (7, 9)
- Trevor Veitch – music contractor (1, 3–5, 7, 9, 10)
- Jeremy Lubbock – string arrangements (3)
- Steve George – backing vocals (2, 4, 5)
- Richard Page – backing vocals (2, 4, 5)
- The Vulgar Boatmen – shout chorus (10)

=== Production ===
- Greg Mathieson – producer (1, 3–5, 7, 9, 10)
- Jay Graydon – engineer (1, 2, 6, 8) producer (2, 6, 8)
- David Leonard – engineer (1, 3–5, 7, 9, 10)
- Ian Eales – engineer (1, 2, 6, 8)
- Tchad Blake – second engineer (1, 3–5, 7, 9, 10)
- Steve Hall – mastering at Future Disc (Hollywood, California)
- Henry Marquez – art direction
- Roy Guzman – design
- Brian Aris – photography
- Ross of John Frieda Salon – hair
- Sue Mann – make-up
- D & J Arlon Enterprises, Ltd. – management

== Charts ==
Chart performance for Best Kept Secret
Chart (1983)	Peak position
Canada Top Albums/CDs (RPM)	38
Japanese Albums (Oricon)	4
Norwegian Albums (VG-lista)	5
Swedish Albums (Sverigetopplistan)	38
UK Albums (Official Charts)	99
US Billboard 200	33
