= Make You Feel My Love =

1997 song by Bob Dylan

Song by Bob Dylan

from the album Time Out of Mind
- Released: September 30, 1997
- Recorded: January 1997
- Studio: Criteria Studios (Miami, FL)
- Genre: Folk rock
- Length: 3:32
- Label: Columbia
- Songwriter: Bob Dylan
- Producer: Daniel Lanois

Time Out of Mind track listing
- 11 tracks: 1. "Love Sick"; 2. "Dirt Road Blues"; 3. "Standing in the Doorway"; 4. "Million Miles"; 5. "Tryin' to Get to Heaven"; 6. "'Til I Fell in Love with You"; 7. "Not Dark Yet"; 8. "Cold Irons Bound"; 9. "Make You Feel My Love"; 10. "Can't Wait"; 11. "Highlands"

Audio video
- "Make You Feel My Love" on YouTube

"Make You Feel My Love", also known as "To Make You Feel My Love", is a song written by Bob Dylan for his album Time Out of Mind, released in September 1997. It was first released commercially in August 1997 by Billy Joel for his compilation album Greatest Hits Volume III.

It is one of the few songs to have achieved the status of becoming a "standard" in the 21st century, having been covered by more than 450 different artists. The best known cover versions are ones by Adele, Michael Bolton, Neil Diamond, Elkie Brooks, Boy George, Bryan Ferry, Joan Osborne, Garth Brooks, Nick Knowles, and Pink.

== Reception ==
Spectrum Culture included the song on a list of "Bob Dylan's 20 Best Songs of the 90s". In an article accompanying the list, critic John Paul described it thus:

"Accompanied by a lone piano, ghostlike bass line and slightly woozy sounding organ playing sustained notes throughout, the arrangement of the song isn't terribly remarkable, the meat of the song itself relying on Dylan's surprisingly emotional read and jazz-like chord progression.

Ultimate Classic Rock critic Matthew Wilkening rated "Make You Feel My Love" as the 7th best song Dylan recorded between 1992 and 2011, praising it as a "weary, textured masterpiece".

A 2021 Guardian article included it on a list of "80 Bob Dylan songs everyone should know".

== Personnel ==
- Bob Dylan – piano, vocals

Additional musicians

- Tony Garnier – upright bass
- Augie Meyers – organ

== Live performances ==
According to his official website, Dylan performed the song live over 300 times in concert between 1997 and 2019 on the Never Ending Tour. A live version performed in Los Angeles in 1998 was released on Dylan's "Things Have Changed" CD single in 2000 and on The Bootleg Series Vol. 17: Fragments - Time Out Of Mind Sessions (1996-1997). The live debut occurred at Columbia Township Auditorium in Columbia, South Carolina on November 2, 1997, and the last performance (to date) took place at The Anthem in Washington, D.C., on December 8, 2019.

== Cover versions ==
=== Billy Joel version ===
"To Make You Feel My Love"

Single by Billy Joel

from the album Greatest Hits Volume III
- B-side: "Intro/Summer, Highland Falls"
- Released: August 13, 1997
- Recorded: 1997
- Genre: Soft rock
- Length: 3:53
- Label: Columbia
- Songwriter: Bob Dylan
- Producer: Peter Asher

Billy Joel singles chronology
"Lullabye (Goodnight, My Angel)" (1994)	"To Make You Feel My Love" (1997)	"Hey Girl" (1997)

Music video
- "To Make You Feel My Love" on YouTube

Billy Joel released his original version of the song, titled "To Make You Feel My Love", for his compilation album Greatest Hits Volume III (1997). It was released as the album's lead single and reached number 50 on the US Billboard Hot 100. Joel's single pre-dated Dylan's release of the song by one month.

==== Chart history ====
Chart (1997)	Peak position
Australia (ARIA)	90
Canada RPM Adult Contemporary	29
Estonia (Eesti Top 20)	18
Netherlands (Single Top 100)	99
US Billboard Hot 100	50
US Billboard Adult Contemporary	9
US Billboard Hot Singles Sales	53

=== Hope Floats versions ===
"To Make You Feel My Love"

Single by Garth Brooks

from the album Hope Floats: Music from the Motion Picture
- Released: May 18, 1998
- Recorded: 1998
- Genre: Country
- Length: 3:54
- Label: Capitol Nashville
- Songwriter: Bob Dylan
- Producer: Allen Reynolds

Garth Brooks singles chronology
"Two Piña Coladas" (1998)	"To Make You Feel My Love" (1998)	"Burnin' the Roadhouse Down" (1998)

"To Make You Feel My Love"

Song by Trisha Yearwood

from the album Hope Floats: Music from the Motion Picture
- Released: April 7, 1998
- Length: 2:57
- Label: Capitol
- Songwriter: Bob Dylan
- Producers: Don Was, Forest Whitaker

Garth Brooks covered the song as "To Make You Feel My Love" in 1998. It appeared on the soundtrack of the 1998 film Hope Floats, along with a cover version by Trisha Yearwood (whom Brooks would marry in 2005) as the first and last tracks. Yearwood's version would be the only version of the song on the soundtrack's 2007 reissue. It was included first as the bonus track on Fresh Horses for Brooks' first Limited Series box set and then included on all later pressings of that album. Brooks' version resulted in a nomination at the 41st Grammy Awards for Best Male Country Vocal Performance and a nomination for Bob Dylan for Best Country Song.

==== Charts ====
===== Weekly charts =====
Chart (1998)	Peak position
Canada Adult Contemporary (RPM)	22
Canada Country Singles (RPM)	7
US Adult Contemporary (Billboard)	8
US Hot Country Songs (Billboard)	1

===== Year-end charts =====
Chart (1998)	Position
Canada Country Tracks (RPM)	63
US Adult Contemporary (Billboard)	22
US Country Songs (Billboard)	32

=== Adele version ===
"Make You Feel My Love"

Single by Adele

from the album 19
- Released: October 27, 2008
- Recorded: October 2007
- Studio: Townhouse (London)
- Length: 3:32
- Label: XL; Columbia
- Songwriter: Bob Dylan
- Producer: Jim Abbiss

Adele singles chronology
"Cold Shoulder" (2008)	"Make You Feel My Love" (2008)	"Water and a Flame" (2009)

Music video
- "Make You Feel My Love" on YouTube

In 2007, English singer-songwriter Adele recorded "Make You Feel My Love" for her debut studio album 19 (2008). It was released as the album's fourth and final single on October 27, 2008, both on CD and vinyl, originally peaking at number 26.

==== Background ====
"Make You Feel My Love" is the only cover song on 19; Adele either wrote or co-wrote all the other tracks.

Adele was initially hesitant to record a cover song on her album, as she was worried it would imply she was incapable of writing enough of her own songs. Nonetheless, she listened to the song under pressure from her manager, Jonathan Dickins, and loved it. She told the Huddersfield Daily Examiner:

I wrote nine songs in a short space of time, all about this awful relationship I was in. I never quite got down what I was really feeling in those songs, though. It wasn't that I was holding back or anything, but I just couldn't get it down. I was bitterly upset and then [Dickins] played me this Bob Dylan song 'Make You Feel My Love'. The lyrics are just amazing and summed up exactly what I'd been trying to say in my songs. It's about regretting not being with someone and it's beautiful. It's weird that my favourite song on my album is a cover, but I couldn't not put it on there. I'm not normally a Dylan fan either.

Piano is played by Neil Cowley and Adele is credited with bass.

==== Critical reception ====
Adele's version received critical acclaim. According to Alex Fletcher of Digital Spy, the version expresses Adele's affection for the song, "with just piano as backing, her dreamy, passionate vocals are allowed to shine".

According to Dave Simpson of The Guardian, with her "hushed delivery", Adele makes the song "her own".

In January 2013, Heart Radio listed Adele's recording as the UK's number one song of all time in its Hall of Fame Top 500.

==== Chart performance ====
Initially, the song only reached a peak of number 26, but found a new lease on life in 2010, two years after its release, following performances by several contestants on the seventh series of The X Factor. In September 2010, after it was performed by Annastasia Baker, it re-entered the UK Singles Chart at number 24. The song then surged to number 4 the following month after a second performance by Gamu Nhengu. Following a third X Factor performance and heavy use in the Comic Relief 2010 television, it spent three more non-consecutive weeks in the top 10. Thanks to this newfound attention, "Make You Feel My Love" was the 48th biggest-selling song of 2010. In early 2011 the song returned to the top 40 again, at number 34, after it was used on the fifth series of Britain's Got Talent.

After years of trickle selling, "Make You Feel My Love" passed the million sales mark in the UK in 2017.

==== Music video ====
The song's music video features Adele singing the song in London Marriott Hotel Canary Wharf. It was directed by Mat Kirkby. As of January 2025, the music video has received over 200 million views on YouTube.

==== Live performances ====
On Friday, November 20, 2015, Adele sang the song during a BBC special, Adele at the BBC, hosted by talk show host Graham Norton. One segment of the show, which went viral, featured a prank in which eight Adele impersonators were invited to audition at the Wimbledon Theatre for a nonexistent show. Adele herself, disguised as a nanny named "Jenny", pretended to also be an Adele impersonator, and was the last one to sing. When she started singing "Make You Feel My Love", the other performers finally recognized her and realized they had been pranked.

==== Usage in media ====
Adele's version features in the soundtrack of the 2010 romantic comedy film When in Rome. Her cover version was also featured in the compilation album for the benefit of those affected by Supertyphoon Haiyan in the Philippines entitled Songs for the Philippines.

During a concert at London's O2 Arena on March 22, 2016, the day of the Brussels bombings, Adele dedicated a performance of the song to the victims of the attacks.

In addition, Adele's video of the song, directed by Mat Kirby, was released on music channels in late September 2008 and continues to be featured on her website.

==== List of recordings ====
Digital download (version 1)

1. "Make You Feel My Love" – 3:32

Digital download (version 2)

1. "Make You Feel My Love" – 3:32
2. "Make You Feel My Love" (video) – 3:32

CD single

1. "Make You Feel My Love" – 3:32
2. "Painting Pictures" – 3:33

19 version

1. "Make You Feel My Love" – 3:32

19 Deluxe version

1. "Make You Feel My Love" (live at Hotel Cafe) – 3:52

Chimes of Freedom live version

1. "Make You Feel My Love" (recorded live at WXPN) – 4:04

Live at the Royal Albert Hall live version

1. "Make You Feel My Love" (Live) – 3:48

==== Charts ====
===== Weekly charts =====
Chart (2008–2021)	Peak position
Belgium (Ultratip Bubbling Under Flanders)	17
Canada (Hot Canadian Digital Songs)	14
European Hot 100 Singles	17
Global 200 (Billboard)	135
Ireland (IRMA)	5
Netherlands (Dutch Top 40)	3
Netherlands (Single Top 100)	1
Scottish Singles Sales (Official Charts)	4
Sweden (Sverigetopplistan)	44
UK Singles (Official Charts)	4
UK Indie (Official Charts)	1
US Digital Song Sales	11

===== Year-end charts =====
Chart (2009)	Position
Netherlands (Dutch Top 40)	16
Netherlands (Single Top 100)	7

Chart (2010)	Position
UK Singles (OCC)	48

Chart (2011)	Position
UK Singles (OCC)	60

===== All-time charts =====
All-time chart rankings for the Adele cover
Chart	Position
Dutch Love Songs (Dutch Top 40)	32

==== Certifications ====
Region	Certification	Certified units/sales
Belgium (BRMA)	Gold	
Brazil (Pro-Música Brasil)	Gold	30,000^{‡}
Canada (Music Canada)	5× Platinum	400,000^{‡}
Denmark (IFPI Danmark)	Platinum	90,000^{‡}
Italy (FIMI)	Platinum	50,000^{‡}
New Zealand (RMNZ)	4× Platinum	120,000^{‡}
Spain (Promusicae)	Platinum	60,000^{‡}
United Kingdom (BPI)	5× Platinum	3,000,000^{‡}
United States (RIAA)	Gold	500,000^{*}
^{*} Sales figures based on certification alone.^{‡} Sales+streaming figures based on certification alone.
