= It Was =

Single by Chely Wright

from the album Single White Female
- B-side: "Rubbin' It In"
- Released: October 4, 1999
- Genre: Country
- Length: 3:51
- Label: MCA Nashville
- Songwriters: Mark Wright; Gary Burr
- Producers: Tony Brown; Buddy Cannon; Norro Wilson

Chely Wright singles chronology
"Single White Female" (1999)	"It Was" (1999)	"She Went Out for Cigarettes" (2000)

"It Was" is a song recorded by American country music artist Chely Wright. The song was released on October 4, 1999 by MCA Nashville as the second single from her fourth studio album Single White Female (1999). It was written by Mark Wright and Gary Burr and was produced by Tony Brown, Buddy Cannon, and Norro Wilson.

The song reached number 11 on the Billboard Hot Country Singles & Tracks chart in April 2000.

== Critical reception ==
Deborah Evans Price of Billboard gave the song a favorable review, saying that it "has a hauntingly beautiful melody and affecting lyric about the mercurial nature of love" and that "Wright possesses a strong voice, full of emotional depth and presence."

== Music video ==
The music video was directed by Deaton-Flanigen Productions and premiered in August 1999.

== Chart performance ==
Chart (1999–2000)	Peak position
Canada Country Singles (RPM)	37
US Billboard Hot 100	64
US Hot Country Songs (Billboard)	11

=== Year-end charts ===
Chart (2000)	Position
US Country Songs (Billboard)	47

== Release history ==
Release dates and format(s) for "It Was"
Region	Date	Format(s)	Label(s)	Ref.
United States	October 4, 1999	Country radio	MCA Nashville	
