= Hope Floats (soundtrack) =

Hope Floats: Music From the Motion Picture

Soundtrack album by Various Artists
- Released: April 7, 1998
- Genres: Country, rock
- Length: 53:42
- Label: Capitol Records
- Producers: Don Was, Forest Whitaker

Singles from Hope Floats: Music From the Motion Picture
- 1. "To Make You Feel My Love" Released: May 18, 1998

Hope Floats: Music From the Motion Picture is the soundtrack of the 1998 film Hope Floats. It was released by Capitol Records on April 7, 1998, featuring 13 tracks by country and rock singers. It reached #4 on The Billboard 200 and #1 on Top Country Albums, and was certified double-platinum by the Recording Industry Association of America (RIAA) for U.S. shipments of two million copies.

== Content ==
One cut from the album, Garth Brooks' rendition of "To Make You Feel My Love", reached No. 1 on the Billboard country singles charts in August 1998. This song also appeared on a re-release of Brooks's 1995 album Fresh Horses which was included in his 1998 box set The Limited Series.

The Bob Seger-Martina McBride duet "Chances Are" peaked at No. 23 on the Billboard Hot Adult Contemporary Tracks chart in 1998. Lila McCann's "To Get Me to You" was also released as a radio single, but did not chart. Paul Davis's 1981 single "Cool Night," which reached No. 11 on the Billboard Hot 100 in 1981, is also included on the album.

A remastered and expanded soundtrack was released on April 24, 2007, featuring an additional six tracks but removing Brooks's song. Garth Brooks’ “To Make You Feel My Love,” a No. 1 country single on the original soundtrack, was not included. Brooks, who controlled his own recordings, sold his music exclusively through Wal-Mart at the time.

== Critical reception ==
Stephen Thomas Erlewine of Allmusic gave the album four stars out of five, calling it "an excellent collection of contemporary country and rootsy mainstream pop."

== Track listing ==
1. "To Make You Feel My Love" – Garth Brooks (3:53)
2. "In Need" – Sheryl Crow (5:29)
3. "Honest I Do" – The Rolling Stones (3:55)
4. "Chances Are" – Bob Seger and Martina McBride (4:17)
5. "All I Get" – The Mavericks (4:08)
6. "Paper Wings" – Gillian Welch (3:57)
7. "Stop! In the Name of Love" – Jonell Mosser (4:31)
8. "Wither, I'm a Flower" – Whiskeytown (4:53)
9. "What Makes You Stay" – Deana Carter (4:35)
10. "To Get Me to You" – Lila McCann (3:50)
11. "Smile" – Lyle Lovett (3:38)
12. "When You Love Someone" – Bryan Adams (3:39)
13. "To Make You Feel My Love" – Trisha Yearwood (2:57)

=== 2007 reissue ===
1. "Main Title: Going Home" – Dave Grusin (3:23)
2. "In Need" – Sheryl Crow (5:29)
3. "Honest I Do" – The Rolling Stones (3:55)
4. "Chances Are" – Bob Seger and Martina McBride (4:17)
5. "All I Get" – The Mavericks (4:08)
6. "Paper Wings" – Gillian Welch (3:57)
7. "Stop! In the Name of Love" – Jonell Mosser (4:31)
8. "Wither, I'm a Flower" – Whiskeytown (4:53)
9. "What Makes You Stay" – Deana Carter (4:35)
10. "To Get Me to You" – Lila McCann (3:50)
11. "Smile" – Lyle Lovett (3:38)
12. "When You Love Someone" – Bryan Adams (3:39)
13. "To Make You Feel My Love" – Trisha Yearwood (2:57)
14. "Daybreak" – Barry Manilow (3:08)
15. "I Can't Get Next to You" – The Temptations (2:52)
16. "Cool Night" – Paul Davis (3:38)
17. "Who Cares Anyway" – Laura Harding (4:10)
18. "Justin & Birdie" – Dave Grusin (3:26)

== Charts ==
=== Weekly charts ===
| Chart (1998) | Peak position |
|---|---|
| Canadian Albums (RPM) | 34 |
| Canadian Country Albums (RPM) | 3 |
| US Billboard 200 | 4 |
| US Top Country Albums (Billboard) | 1 |

=== Year-end charts ===
| Chart (1998) | Position |
|---|---|
| US Billboard 200 | 37 |
| US Top Country Albums (Billboard) | 4 |
| Chart (1999) | Position |
| US Billboard 200 | 120 |
| US Top Country Albums (Billboard) | 9 |
| Chart (2000) | Position |
| US Top Country Albums (Billboard) | 68 |

== Certifications and sales ==
| Region | Certification | Certified units/sales |
|---|---|---|
| Canada (Music Canada) | Platinum | 100,000^{^} |
| United States (RIAA) | 2× Platinum | 2,600,000 |
^{^} Shipments figures based on certification alone.
