= Who Needs the Moon =

Single by Chad Klinger

from the album Chad Klinger
- Released: 1999
- Genre: Country
- Length: 3:59
- Label: CK
- Songwriters: Chad Klinger; Dean Sams
- Producer: Dean Sams

Chad Klinger singles chronology
"Who Needs the Moon" (1999)	"Bring It On" (1999)

"Who Needs the Moon" is a song recorded by Canadian country music artist Chad Klinger. It was released in 1999 as the first single from his debut album, Chad Klinger. It peaked at number 12 on the RPM Country Tracks chart in August 1999.

== Chart performance ==
Chart (1999)	Peak position
Canada Country Singles (RPM)	12

=== Year-end charts ===
Chart (1999)	Position
Canada Country Tracks (RPM)	88
