= Two Teardrops =

Studio album by Steve Wariner
- Released: May 4, 1999
- Recorded: January 16, 1999
- Studio: The Music Mill and Ocean Way Nashville (Nashville, Tennessee); Sound Kitchen and Steve Wariner's Studio (Franklin, Tennessee)
- Genre: Country
- Length: 51:53
- Label: Capitol Nashville
- Producer: Steve Wariner

Steve Wariner chronology
Burnin' the Roadhouse Down (1998)	Two Teardrops (1999)	Faith in You (2000)

Professional ratings
Review scores
Source	Rating
AllMusic	3/5 stars
Entertainment Weekly	B

Two Teardrops is the fifteenth studio album by American country music singer Steve Wariner. Released in 1999, it was his second studio album for Capitol Nashville. The album, which was certified gold in the United States, produced two singles for Wariner on the Billboard country charts in 1999: "I'm Already Taken" at number 3 and the title track at number 2. The former was originally recorded by Wariner in 1978, and was a number 63-peaking single for him on the country charts that year.

== Track listing ==
No.	Title	Writer(s)	Length
1.	"Hands of Time"	Steve Wariner, Bob DiPiero	2:37
2.	"Two Teardrops"	Wariner, Bill Anderson	4:29
3.	"You Be My Everything"	Wariner, Bill LaBounty	3:25
4.	"I'm Already Taken"	Wariner, Terry Ryan	3:20
5.	"I've Been in That Movie"	Wariner	3:28
6.	"If You Don't Know by Now"	Wariner, Rick Carnes, Janis Carnes	3:30
7.	"Talk to Her Heart" (duet with Bryan White)	Wariner, Anderson, Jim Weatherly	2:39
8.	"So Much"	Wariner, Marcus Hummon	3:06
9.	"I'll Always Have Denver"	Wariner, Anderson	4:38
10.	"That's Love for You"	Wariner, Joe Barnhill	3:13
11.	"Cry No More"	Wariner, Hummon	4:20
12.	"Since You Walked Away"	Wariner, Don Cook, John Barlow Jarvis	4:12
13.	"For the First Time"	Jud J. Friedman, James Newton Howard, Alan Rich	4:11
14.	"Tattoos of Life"	Wariner, Max D. Barnes	3:10
15.	"The Harry Shuffle" (instrumental)"	Wariner	1:36

== Personnel ==
Compiled from liner notes.

- Steve Wariner – vocals, backing vocals, acoustic guitars, electric guitars
- John Barlow Jarvis – acoustic piano, Wurlitzer electric piano
- Steve Nathan – organ, synthesizers
- Matt Rollings – acoustic piano, Wurlitzer electric piano
- Brent Mason – electric guitars
- Reggie Young – electric guitars
- Derek George – slide guitar, backing vocals
- Ryan Wariner – electric guitar (8)
- Marcus Hummon – acoustic guitar (11)
- Jerry Douglas – dobro
- Paul Franklin – steel guitar
- Sonny Garrish – steel guitar
- Woody Lingle – bass guitar
- Michael Rhodes – bass guitar
- Glenn Worf – acoustic bass
- Eddie Bayers – drums
- Ron Gannaway — drums, percussion
- Paul Leim – drums
- John Gardner – drums (14)
- Tom Roady – percussion
- Stuart Duncan — fiddle
- Hoot Hester — fiddle
- Terry McMillan – harmonica
- Bobby Taylor – oboe
- Nashville String Machine – strings
- Bergen White – string arrangements
- Carl Gorodetzky – concertmaster
- Harry Stinson – backing vocals
- Terry Wariner – backing vocals
- Andrea Zonn – backing vocals
- Bryan White – vocals (7)

=== Production ===
- Steve Wariner – producer
- Randy Gardner – recording, string recording, mixing (5, 6, 14, 15)
- Steve Marcantonio – mixing (1–4, 7–13)
- Jason Brecking – recording assistant
- Joe Hayden – string recording assistant
- Amy Frigo – mix assistant (1–4, 7–13)
- JC Monterrosa – mix assistant (1–4, 7–13)
- Eric Conn – digital editing
- Carlos Grier – digital editing
- Denny Purcell – mastering at Georgetown Masters (Nashville, Tennessee)
- Jonathan Russell – mastering assistant
- Caryn Wariner – production assistant
- Virginia Team – art direction
- Jerry Joyner – design
- Mark Tucker – photography
- Carlton Davis – art production
- Denise Jarvis – production assistance
- Colourworks – digital imager
- Robin Gary – hair stylist

== Charts ==
=== Weekly charts ===
Chart (1999)	Peak position
Canadian Country Albums (RPM)	6
US Billboard 200	35
US Top Country Albums (Billboard)	6

=== Year-end charts ===
Chart (1999)	Position
US Top Country Albums (Billboard)	41
