= John Landry =

- Birth name: John Mark Landry
- Born: December 22, 1969 (age 55)
- Origin: Montreal, Quebec, Canada
- Genres: Country
- Occupation: Singer-songwriter
- Instrument(s): Vocals, guitar
- Years active: 1999–present
- Labels: Spin Records/EMI Canada, Icon Records/Universal Canada, Tangents North
- Website: jlandry.com

John Landry (born December 22, 1969) is a Canadian country music artist. Landry's debut album, Forever Took Too Long, was released in 1999 by Spin Records. Its first two singles, "There You Were" and "Bit by Bit," both reached the Top 10 of the Canadian Country Singles chart. Landry was nominated for a 2000 Juno Award for Best Country Male Artist.

Landry entertained on the country stage at the 2003 Palmer Rapids Twin Festival in Ontario.

== Discography ==
=== Studio albums ===
Title	Details
Forever Took Too Long	Release date: August 23, 1999; Label: Spin Records
Bottom of the Ninth	Release date: June 10, 2002; Label: Spin Records
Someday	Release date: June 21, 2005; Label: Icon Records
Changing Man	Release date: November 2, 2010; Label: Tangents North Music
Don't Look Back	Release date: May 20, 2014; Label: Jlanpro

=== Singles ===
Year	Single	Peak positions	Album
Year	Single	CAN Country	Album
1999	"There You Were"	7	Forever Took Too Long
1999	"Bit by Bit"	9	Forever Took Too Long
1999	"Which Way Is Love" (with Beverley Mahood)	—	Forever Took Too Long
1999	"Long Gone and Forgotten"	16	Forever Took Too Long
2000	"My Heart Says Yes (But the Hurt Says No)" (with Stacey Lee)	35	Forever Took Too Long
2000	"Fantasy Island"	*	Forever Took Too Long
2001	"Same Old Love"	*	Forever Took Too Long
2002	"When Will Your Memory Let Me Go"	*	Bottom of the Ninth
2003	"Everybody Rides"	*	Bottom of the Ninth
2003	"Ooh La La Baby"	*	Bottom of the Ninth
2004	"Drive On"	*	Bottom of the Ninth
2005	"Someday"	*	Someday
2006	"She Comes to Me"	*	Someday
2010	"Everybody Wants to Be a Redneck"	*	Changing Man
2011	"Changing Man"	*	Changing Man
2014	"God Given Day"	—	Don't Look Back
2015	"Bird's Eye View"	—	Don't Look Back
"—" denotes releases that did not chart * denotes unknown peak positions

=== Guest singles ===
Year	Single	Artist
2011	"Home Now"	Tenille

=== Music videos ===
Year	Single	Director
1999	"There You Were"	
1999	"Bit by Bit"	
1999	"Which Way Is Love" (with Beverley Mahood)	
1999	"Long Gone and Forgotten"	
2000	"My Heart Says Yes (But the Hurt Says No)" (with Stacey Lee)	
2000	"Fantasy Island"	
2001	"Same Old Love"	
2002	"When Will Your Memory Let Me Go"	
2003	"Everybody Rides"	
2011	"Changing Man"	Zac Whyte
