= Tom Douglas (songwriter) =

American country music songwriter

- Born: Thomas Stevenson Douglas; January 27, 1953 (age 73)
- Origin: Atlanta, Georgia, U.S.
- Genre: Country
- Occupation: Songwriter
- Years active: 1993 – present

Thomas Stevenson Douglas (born January 27, 1953) is an American country music songwriter. He has written Top 10 Billboard Country hits for John Michael Montgomery, Martina McBride, Tim McGraw, Collin Raye, Lady Antebellum, Miranda Lambert, Kenny Chesney and others.

== Early life ==
Tom Douglas was born in Atlanta, where he grew up with musical influence from his father, who sold steel by day and played the piano and ukulele at night. Douglas describes, “There was always music in the house” and describes his father as being an artist at heart. Tom took piano lessons in second grade, but didn't find real interest in the instrument until he first heard “Your Song” by Elton John. He would often practice and learn by playing Glen Campbell hits, especially those written by Jimmy Webb, who is Douglas’ idol.

Douglas graduated from Oglethorpe University in 1975, and from Georgia State University in 1977 with an MBA. He worked in Atlanta selling advertising, but decided to quit his job to pursue his calling in songwriting. At the age of 27, Douglas opened a small publishing company with two of his friends, and moved to Nashville to pursue music for four years. During his time in Nashville, he met his wife, Katie, with whom he decided to move to Dallas to work in commercial real estate, where he would stay for 13 years and raise 3 children.

== Career ==
In 1993, after revisiting songwriting as a hobby, Douglas attended a songwriters’ seminar in Austin and he played his song “Little Rock” for producer/publisher Paul Worley, who decided to take some of Tom's songs back to Nashville with him. One of his first cuts, "Little Rock," recorded by Collin Raye, made it to the country top ten in 1994, peaking at #2. "Little Rock" was nominated for Song of the Year by the Country Music Association in 1994, and received a "Million-Air" award from Broadcast Music Incorporated (BMI) for receiving one million spins on country radio. Douglas then signed with Sony/ATV Music Publishing in June 1994, and returned to Nashville, Tennessee in 1997.

Douglas topped the charts again in 1998 with his second number-one hit, “The Gift”, as recorded by and co-written with Jim Brickman. In 2001, Douglas started cowriting for Tim McGraw, and wrote the Number One singles "Grown Men Don't Cry" and "Southern Voice," as well as the Top Five songs "My Little Girl" (which also became the end title for the Fox film, “Flicka” in 2006) and "Let It Go." He cowrote on McGraw's 2015 album Damn Country Music As well. He also co-wrote Martina McBride's "Love's the Only House," as well as Lady Antebellum's Number One "I Run to You." In 2009 Tom received the rare Triple Play Award, in which he had three number one hits in a year. These included Lady Antebellum's “I Run To You”, followed by Tim McGraw's “Southern Voice” and Miranda Lambert's “The House That Built Me”.

In 2016, Douglas decided to venture out of his regular co-writing to create Shatter the Madness, a project written with his songwriting partner Allen Shamblin. The project consisted of a mixed-media collection of songs and music videos about a man's struggle to find wholeness in a broken world. Douglas was a vocalist for the four-song project, which included his version of the hit Miranda Lambert made famous, "The House That Built Me."

== Honors, recognition and notable work ==
- In 1994, "Little Rock," reached No. 2 and was nominated for CMA Song of the Year
- In 1998 "The Gift" (recorded co-written with Jim Brickman), reached No. 1
- In 2001, "Grown Men Don't Cry", recorded by Tim McGraw reached No. 1
- In 2009, I Run to You recorded by Lady Antebellum, reached No. 1 and earned CMA Single of the Year
- Also in 2009, "Southern Voice," recorded by Tim McGraw reached No. 1
- In 2010, "The House That Built Me" was nominated for a Grammy Award for Country Song of the Year and Song of the Year. The song went on to win CMA Song of the Year, as well as ACM's Song Of The Year and Single Record Of The Year. In 2019, the song earned the Academy of Country Music's first ever Song of the Decade Award.
- In 2010, Douglas was also nominated for an Oscar and a Golden Globe for the song "Coming Home (song)" featured in the film "Country Strong."
- In 2011, his hit song "I Run to You" was included on the compilation album "Songs for Japan", which was released in the wake of Japan's tsunami/earthquake disaster in 2011. The album featured songs from more than 30 superstars, including U2, Justin Bieber, Justin Timberlake, Madonna, Bruce Springsteen, Elton John, Keith Urban, Cee Lo Green, John Lennon and Bob Dylan. Proceeds went towards the Japanese Red Cross Society to support its disaster relief efforts in the country.
- In 2014, "Meanwhile Back at Mama's" was nominated for Grammy's Country Song Of The Year.
- Also in 2014, Tom Douglas paired up with Jobs for Life to teach a six-week songwriting class to inmates at Hill Detention Center in Nashville.
- Douglas was inducted to the Nashville Songwriters Hall of Fame on October 5, 2014.
- In 2015, "Raise 'Em Up", recorded by Keith Urban and Eric Church Earned Airplay #1, and received a Grammy Award Nomination for Best Country Duo/Group Performance
- In 2016, Douglas released Shatter the Madness with Allen Shamblin
- In 2017, Douglas represented the NSAI (Nashville Songwriters Association International) to testify in support of the Music Modernization Act of 2017, which was unanimously passed by the House of Representatives on April 25, 2018.
- In 2018, Douglas received the MusicRow Award for Song of the Year for his work on Chris Janson's single "Drunk Girl".
- In 2019, Miranda Lambert's classic "The House That Built Me" earned the Academy of Country Music's first ever Song of the Decade Award, commemorating the ballad's impact and cultural significance.

== List of Singles Co-Written by Tom Douglas ==
- Alabama — "We Made Love"
- Lady Antebellum — "I Run to You", "Hello World", "Heart of the World"
- Blue County — "Firecrackers and Ferris Wheels"
- Miranda Lambert — "The House That Built Me"
- Martina McBride — "Love's the Only House", "God's Will"
- Tim McGraw — "Grown Men Don't Cry", "My Little Girl", "Let It Go", "Southern Voice", "Meanwhile Back at Mama's"
- George Strait — "I Got a Car"
- John Michael Montgomery — "Nothing Catches Jesus By Surprise"
- Collin Raye — "Little Rock", "Love Remains", "The Gift"
- Sons of the Desert — "Leaving October"
- Phil Vassar — "This Is My Life", "Prayer of a Common Man"
- The Warren Brothers — "Where Does It Hurt", "Hey Mr. President"
- Lee Ann Womack — "Something Worth Leaving Behind"
- Yankee Grey — "Another Nine Minutes"
- Brett Eldredge — "One Mississippi", Somethin' I'm Good At", "Illinois", "No Stopping You", "Brother"
- Mockingbird Sun — "That Girl Tonight"
- Carrie Underwood — "Forever Changed", "Ghost on the Stereo"
- Keith Urban and Eric Church — "Raise 'Em Up"
- Celine Dion — "Recovering"
- Drake White — "Livin’ the Dream"
- Sister Hazel — "Something to Believe In"
- Chris Janson — "Drunk Girl"
- Abby Anderson — "Make Him Wait"
- Kenny Chesney — "Song for the Saints"
- Rachel Wammack — "Damage"
- Josh Osborne — "Going Home"
- Sarah McLachlan — "Song for My Father"
- Pink featuring Chris Stapleton — "Love Me Anyway"
- Kane Brown — "For My Daughter"

== Other Notable Songs ==
=== 2001-2010 ===
2001

- "Mr. Midnight", recorded by Garth Brooks on his album Scarecrow
- "Melancholy Blue", recorded by Trisha Yearwood on her album Inside Out

2002

- "Passionate Desperate Love", becorded by Emerson Drive on their self-titled album

2003

- "Four Down and Twelve Across", recorded by George Strait on his album Honkytonkville
- "Sleep Baby Sleep", recorded by Jon Christopher Davis on his album Lone Star Attitude

2004

- "Leaving October", recorded by Drew Womack on his self-titled album

2005

- "Freedom", recorded by Kenny Chesney on his album The Road and the Radio
- "I Am a Man", recorded by Lonestar on their album Coming Home
- "Hear Me", recorded by Michael Bolton on his album Til The End Of Forever

2006

- "A Million Kisses Late", recorded by Matt Dusk on his album Back in Town

2007

- "Love Land", recorded by Martina McBride on her album Waking Up Laughing
- "Back There Again", recorded by Blake Shelton on his album Pure BS
- "The Buffalo", recorded by Billy Ray Cyrus on his album Home at Last

2009

- "Faith In You", recorded by Faith Hill on her albul Country Love
- "Love of My Life", recorded by Jim Brickman on his album From The Heart

2010

- "When You Have A Child", recorded by Reba McEntire on her album All the Woman That I Am

=== 2011-present ===
2011

- "Heart of the World", recorded by Lady Antebellum on their album Own the Night
- "Rocket Science", recorded by Lori McKenna on her album Lorraine

2012

- "Sing 'Em Good My Friend", recorded by Kenny Chesney on his album Welcome To The Fish Bowl
- "Van Gogh", recorded by Neal McCoy on his album XII

2013

- "One Mississippi", recorded by Brett Eldredge on his album Bring You Back
- "Marley", recorded by Kenny Chesney on his album Life on a Rock
- "Number 37405", recorded by Tim McGraw on his album Two Lanes of Freedom

2014

- "If This Bus Could Talk", recorded by Kenny Chesney on his album The Big Revival
- "Meanwhile Back At Mama's", recorded by Tim McGraw on his album Sundown Heaven Town

2015

- "To The Moon And Back", recorded by Luke Bryan on his album Kill The Lights
- "Love Land", recorded by Reba McEntire on her album Love Somebody
- "Losin You", recorded by Tim McGraw on his album Damn Country Music

2016

- "The Fighters", recorded by Locash on their album The Fighters
- "Livin' The Dream", recorded by Drake White on his album Spark
- "Cold Spot", recorded by Kane Brown on his album Kane Brown
- "Four Down and Twelve Across" by George Strait on his album Strait Out of the Box, Pt. 2

2017

- "Drive", recorded by The Eli Young Band on their album Fingerprints
- "Everybody", recorded by Chris Janson on his album Everybody
- "Savannah", recorded by Parmalee on their album 27861

2018

- "Unravel", recorded by Nashville (2012 TV series) for season 6, episode 7
