= I'm Already Taken =

Single by Steve Wariner

from the album Down in Tennessee
- B-side: "Daytime Dreamer"
- Released: April 22, 1978
- Genre: Country
- Length: 3:19
- Label: RCA Nashville #11173
- Songwriters: Steve Wariner, Terry Ryan
- Producer: Chet Atkins

Steve Wariner singles chronology
"I'm Already Taken" (1978)	"So Sad (To Watch Good Love Go Bad)" (1978)

"I'm Already Taken"

Single by Steve Wariner

from the album Two Teardrops
- B-side: "Tattoos of Life"
- Released: July 3, 1999
- Genre: Country
- Length: 3:19
- Label: Capitol Nashville #58786
- Songwriters: Steve Wariner, Terry Ryan
- Producer: Steve Wariner

Steve Wariner singles chronology
"Two Teardrops" (1999)	"I'm Already Taken" (1999)	"Been There" (2000)

"I'm Already Taken" is the debut single by American country music artist Steve Wariner, released in April 1978. It peaked at number 63 on the U.S. Billboard country singles chart. In 1999, Wariner re-recorded the song for his album Two Teardrops. He released this re-recording in July as that album's second single, taking to number 3 on the same chart, as well as number 42 on the Billboard Hot 100.

Wariner co-wrote the song when he was 23 years old. The rendition from Two Teardrops includes a backing vocal from his brother, Terry, who has also sung backing vocals in Wariner's road band. Conway Twitty recorded the song on his 1981 album Mr. T. Conway's daughter Kathy Twitty provided the female backing vocals on his version.

== Chart positions ==
Chart (1978)	Peak position
US Hot Country Songs (Billboard)	63
Chart (1999)	Peak position
Canada Country Singles (RPM)	10
US Billboard Hot 100	42
US Hot Country Songs (Billboard)	3

=== Year-end charts ===
Chart (1999)	Position
Canada Country Tracks (RPM)	56
US Country Songs (Billboard)	31
