= 26 Cents =

Single by The Wilkinsons

from the album Nothing but Love
- Released: June 16, 1998
- Genre: Country
- Length: 3:51
- Label: Giant
- Songwriters: William Wallace; Steve Wilkinson
- Producers: Tony Haselden; Doug Johnson; Russ Zavitson

The Wilkinsons singles chronology
"26 Cents" (1998)	"Fly (The Angel Song)" (1998)

"26 Cents", also written as "26¢", is the debut single of the Canadian country music group the Wilkinsons. Written by group member Steve Wilkinson and William Wallace, it was released in June 1998 as the first single from their album Nothing but Love. The song reached number one on the RPM Country Tracks chart in August 1998 and number 3 on the U.S. Billboard Hot Country Singles & Tracks chart. It was named both Society of Composers, Authors and Music Publishers of Canada (SOCAN) Song of the Year and Single of the Year at the 1999 Canadian Country Music Association Awards.

== Content ==
The song is about a girl who has just turned 18 and is moving away to her own place. The song's title comes from the "penny for your thoughts, a quarter for the call" that her mother gives her before she leaves.

== Music video ==
The music video was directed by Jim Shea and premiered in mid-1998.

== Chart performance ==
Chart (1998)	Peak position
Canada Country Singles (RPM)	1
US Billboard Hot 100	55
US Hot Country Songs (Billboard)	3

=== Year-end charts ===
Chart (1998)	Position
Canada Country Tracks (RPM)	3
US Country Songs (Billboard)	25

== Awards and nominations ==
Association	Category	Result
41st Annual Grammy Awards	Grammy Award for Best Country Duo/Group Performance	Nominated
Academy of Country Music	Single Record of the Year	Nominated
Canadian Country Music Association	Single of the Year	Won
Canadian Country Music Association	SOCAN Song of the Year	Won
Canadian Country Music Association	Video of the Year	Nominated
