= The Spurs =

Canadian country music duo

- Origin: Calgary, Alberta, Canada
- Genres: Country
- Years active: 1999–2000
- Label: Golden Eagle
- Past members: Becky Holmes; Phil Holmes

The Spurs was a Canadian country music group consisting of husband Phil Holmes and wife Becky Holmes.

Founded in Calgary, Alberta, they transitioned to Ottawa, Ontario, Canada. They were nominated for top country group or duo at the 2000 Big Country Awards.

Phil WAS the principal writer, vocalises and plays lead guitar With roots in the "fiddle and step-dancing circuit", Becky hales from Pembroke, Ontario. On stage she combines vocals, keyboard, fiddle and step-dancing.

Released in January 1999, their first album, Black Top fever, was popular.

They had at least three noted singles.

1. The single "Easy As 1-2-3" was their first top 20 hit, and topped out at number 17 on the RPM 100 Country chart; it was given extensive airplay overseas. The track was written by Phil Holmes, who coproduced it with John Dooher. It was released on Don Gashey's Golden Eagle label.
2. Their second single, "Swingin' Door Of Love", remained 17 weeks on the RPM Country 100 chart for 37 weeks. It shared the chart with "Easy as 1-2-3". Phil Holmes wrote it, and it was off the Black Top Fever, a Golden Eagle album. John Dooher produced it along with Phil Holmes. "Both tracks are 100%" Canadian content.
3. A third single is "Flowers, Candy & Cash".

== Discography ==
=== Albums ===
Year	Album
1999	Blacktop Fever

=== Singles ===
Year	Single	CAN Country	Album
1999	"Easy as 1, 2, 3"	17	Blacktop Fever
1999	"Swingin' Door of Love"	29	Blacktop Fever
2000	"Flowers, Candy & Cash"	76	Blacktop Fever
