= Single White Female (album) =

1999 album by Chely Wright

Studio album by Chely Wright
- Released: May 18, 1999
- Recorded: January 1999
- Genre: Country
- Length: 38:33
- Label: MCA Nashville
- Producer: Tony Brown, Buddy Cannon, Norro Wilson

Chely Wright chronology
Let Me In (1997)	Single White Female (1999)	Never Love You Enough (2001)

Singles from Single White Female
- 1. "Single White Female" Released: March 22, 1999; 2. "It Was" Released: October 4, 1999; 3. "She Went Out for Cigarettes" Released: May 30, 2000

Professional ratings
Review scores
Source	Rating
Allmusic	4/5 stars

Single White Female is the fourth studio album by American country music artist Chely Wright. The album was released on May 18, 1999, by MCA Nashville Records. It was produced by Tony Brown, Buddy Cannon, and Norro Wilson. The album was originally to be titled The Fire, but was re-titled to Single White Female when the title track was increasing on the charts.

The album was certified Gold by the RIAA. Its lead single, "Single White Female", hit number 1 on the Billboard Hot Country Songs chart for a week. The second single, "It Was", peaked at number 11 on the country charts. The third and final single, "She Went Out for Cigarettes" also charted.

== Background ==
Single White Female was recorded in January 1999 in Nashville, Tennessee, and was released with ten tracks. Stephen Thomas Erlewine of Allmusic considered the album to "pick up where its predecessor left off", giving ten songs with "clean" and "tasteful arrangements". Erlewine opines that the record's production helped to put Wright's vocals in the lead of the instrumentation instead of being left behind large orchestral arrangements. About.com found Single White Female to incorporate "a nice mixture of fast-paced songs and ballads." The reviewer said, "The singles are really well-done, and the rest of the album is not what you'd call filler. The songs have that uniqueness that is Chely, and it's easy to see why this record is her most successful to date." Fellow country artists Vince Gill, Alison Krauss, Patty Loveless, and Trisha Yearwood sing harmony vocals on several of the album's tracks. Single White Female included a re-recorded cover of Wright's 1996 single "The Love That We Lost".

== Critical reception ==
For the most part, Single White Female was given positive reviews from critics. Writing for Country Standard Time, Rick Teverbaugh called the album "more mature" and "thoughtful" than her latter record. Teverbaugh later mentioned that the track "Picket Fences" seemed as if it was "TV inspired", while he considered "Some Kind of Somethin'" to be a "lighter" track on the record. Teverbaugh then discussed the ninth track "Rubbin' It In", calling it the most "clever" song on the record. Teverbaugh described the plot behind the song: "...about a woman so self-absorbed in her own lovesickness that she believes everyone knows and is making her more aware of her own misery." About.com gave Single White Female a fairly mixed review, stating that the release "was filled with songs of emotion, happy or sad." The site gave the song "The Love That We Lost" negative feedback, calling the production on it, "bland and pop". The album's seventh track "Picket Fences" was also given a negative response, finding its tempo to drag. The reviewer then gave his/her reasoning: "The slow tempo of the song just makes things seem to drag, and frankly, I'm not inclined to be sympathetic to the character's story." Overall however, the site found the album to be "a collection of songs which range in emotion from happy-go-lucky to taking charge of your life." Writing for Allmusic, Stephen Thomas Erlewine gave Single White Female four out of five stars, stating that most of its tracks do not immediately grab the listener's attention, but will eventually work well into someone's memory. Erlewine noted that Wright's best vocal performances were on the album's balances, however he found the title track and "The Fire" to be "equally convincing". He concluded that the album's tracks are the main reasons that the record is a "welcome addition" to Wright's catalog of music.

== Release and singles ==
Single White Female released its lead song, the title track, as the album's first single in March 1999. The song became Wright's first Top 10 single and her first and only number one hit, reaching the top spot in September 1999. The title track also reached number 36 on the Billboard Hot 100 and also topped the Canadian Country Tracks chart. The album itself was released on May 18, 1999, and peaked at number 15 on the Billboard Top Country Albums chart, number 124 on the Billboard 200, and number 16 on the RPM Country Albums/CD's chart. The second single released was the third track entitled "It Was", which was issued in September 1999, peaking at number 11 on the Billboard Hot Country Singles & Tracks chart and #52 on the Canadian Country Tracks chart. The third and final single released from Single White Female was the record's second track "She Went Out for Cigarettes". The song reached number 49 on the Hot Country Singles & Tracks list and number 84 on the Canadian Country Tracks chart.

== Track listing ==
No.	Title	Writer(s)	Length
1.	"Single White Female"	Carolyn Dawn Johnson, Shaye Smith	3:17
2.	"She Went Out for Cigarettes"	Ronnie Guilbeau, John McElroy	4:13
3.	"It Was"	Gary Burr, Mark Wright	3:51
4.	"Unknown"	Burr, Aimee Mayo	3:40
5.	"The Love That We Lost"	Burr, Monty Powell	4:02
6.	"The Fire"	Clarence "Satch" Satchell, Leslie Satcher	3:05
7.	"Picket Fences"	Chely Wright	4:06
8.	"Some Kind of Somethin'"	Sunny Russ, Wright	3:59
9.	"Rubbin' It In"	Chad Smith	3:44
10.	"Why Do I Still Want You"	Satcher	4:39

== Personnel ==
- Pat Buchanan – electric guitar
- Chad Cromwell – drums
- Stuart Duncan – fiddle, mandolin, background vocals
- Dan Dugmore – acoustic slide guitar, steel guitar
- Vince Gill – background vocals
- Aubrey Haynie – fiddle, mandolin, background vocals
- John Hobbs – Hammond B-3 Organ, keyboards
- Sonya Isaacs – background vocals
- Alison Krauss – background vocals
- Patty Loveless – background vocals
- Terry McMillan – percussion
- Steve Nathan – keyboards
- Melonie Cannon Richardson – background vocals
- Matt Rollings – piano, Hammond B-3 organ, keyboards
- Robby Turner – steel guitar
- John Willis – acoustic guitar
- Glenn Worf – bass guitar, background vocals
- Chely Wright – lead vocals
- Trisha Yearwood – background vocals

== Sales chart positions ==
=== Weekly charts ===
Chart (1999)	Peak position
Canadian Country Albums/CD's (RPM)	16
US Billboard 200	124
US Top Country Albums (Billboard)	15
US Heatseekers Albums (Billboard)	3
UK Country Albums (OCC)	8

=== Year-end charts ===
Chart (1999)	Position
US Top Country Albums (Billboard)	61
Chart (2000)	Position
US Top Country Albums (Billboard)	46

=== Singles ===
Year	Single	Peak chart positions		
Year	Single	US Country	US	CAN Country
1999	"Single White Female"	1	36	1
1999	"It Was"	11	64	52
2000	"She Went Out for Cigarettes"	49	—	84
"—" denotes releases that did not chart.
