= Fly (The Angel Song) =

Single by The Wilkinsons

from the album Nothing but Love
- Released: October 27, 1998
- Genre: Country
- Length: 3:43
- Label: Giant
- Songwriters: Rory Bourke; Steve Wilkinson
- Producers: Tony Haselden; Doug Johnson; Russ Zavitson

The Wilkinsons singles chronology
"26 Cents" (1998)	"Fly (The Angel Song)" (1998)	"Boy Oh Boy" (1999)

"Fly (The Angel Song)" is a song written by Steve Wilkinson and Rory Bourke, and recorded by Canadian country music group The Wilkinsons. It was released in October 1998 as the second single from their album Nothing but Love. It reached #1 on the Canadian RPM Country Tracks chart in January 1999 and #15 on the U.S. Billboard Hot Country Singles & Tracks chart.

== Music video ==
The music video was directed by Deaton Flanigen and premiered in late 1998.

== Chart performance ==
Chart (1998–1999)	Peak position
Canada Country Singles (RPM)	1
US Billboard Hot 100	53
US Hot Country Songs (Billboard)	15

=== Year-end charts ===
Chart (1999)	Position
Canada Country Tracks (RPM)	58
US Country Songs (Billboard)	63
