= Two Teardrops (song) =

Single by Steve Wariner

from the album Two Teardrops
- B-side: "Cry No More"
- Released: February 20, 1999
- Genre: Country
- Length: 4:29
- Label: Capitol Nashville
- Songwriters: Bill Anderson, Steve Wariner
- Producer: Steve Wariner

Steve Wariner singles chronology
"Every Little Whisper" (1998)	"Two Teardrops" (1999)	"I'm Already Taken" (1999)

"Two Teardrops" is a song co-written and recorded by American country music artist Steve Wariner. It was released in February 1999 as the first single and title track from the album Two Teardrops. The song reached #2 on the Billboard Hot Country Singles & Tracks chart, as well as hitting #30 on the Billboard Hot 100, marking Wariner's only pop top-40 hit.

== Background ==
Wariner told Billboard in 1999 that he did not write the song until the album was near completion. He said that co-writer Bill Anderson suggested the opening line of "two teardrops floating down the river."

== Chart performance ==
Chart (1999)	Peak position
Canada Country Singles (RPM)	5
US Billboard Hot 100	30
US Hot Country Songs (Billboard)	2

=== Year-end charts ===
Chart (1999)	Position
Canada Country Tracks (RPM)	37
US Country Songs (Billboard)	21
