= Almost Over You =

- Artwork for UK and Dutch vinyl singles

Single by Sheena Easton

from the album Best Kept Secret
- B-side: "I Don't Need Your Word"
- Released: 10 October 1983 / November 22, 1983 (US)
- Genre: Pop / Adult Contemporary
- Length: 3:40
- Label: EMI Records (original), RT Industries (current)
- Songwriters: Jennifer Kimball, C. Richardson
- Producer: Greg Mathieson

Sheena Easton singles chronology
"Telefone (Long Distance Love Affair)" (1983)	"Almost Over You" (1983)	"Devil in a Fast Car" (1984)

"Almost Over You" is a 1983 single by Scottish singer Sheena Easton from her Best Kept Secret LP. It was written by Jennifer Kimball and Cindy Richardson. The single reached number 25 on the Billboard Hot 100, while its Adult Contemporary peak was number 4. In Canada, the song reached number 35 and number one on the Adult Contemporary chart.

== Background ==
The lyrics tells of a woman who almost overcame the pain, misery, and shattered dreams her former lover gave to her, which suggests the title.

== Music video ==
This song features Easton singing and playing a piano in an apartment. The arcade game machines Defender and Sinistar appear in the video with Easton herself "dumping" Defender out over the balcony. The song and the music video of Easton throwing the game machine out of the balcony, coincided with the video game market crashing that year.

== Charts ==
Chart (1983–84)	Peak position
Australia (Kent Music Report)	68
Canada RPM Adult Contemporary	1
Canada RPM Top Singles	35
UK Singles Chart	89
US Billboard Hot 100	25
US Adult Contemporary	4
US Hot Country Songs	86
US Cash Box Top 100	23

== Cover versions ==
- In 1986, argentine singer Sandra Mihanovich covered the song for her 1986 album "En El Paraiso". In 1997, country singer Lila McCann covered the song for her debut album Lila. It was released as the album's third single in 1998 and reached number 42 on the Billboard Hot Country Songs chart.
