= Single White Female (song) =

- US promo and European single cover

Single by Chely Wright

from the album Single White Female
- B-side: "Let Me In"
- Released: February 9, 1999
- Recorded: 1998
- Studio: The Tracking Room (Nashville, TN)
- Genre: Country
- Length: 3:17
- Label: MCA Nashville
- Songwriters: Carolyn Dawn Johnson; Shaye Smith
- Producers: Tony Brown; Buddy Cannon; Norro Wilson

Chely Wright singles chronology
| "I Already Do" (1998) | "Single White Female" (1999) | "It Was" (1999) |

Music video
- "Single White Female" on YouTube

"Single White Female" is a song by American country music artist Chely Wright, penned by Canadian country singer-songwriter Carolyn Dawn Johnson and Shaye Smith and produced by Tony Brown, Buddy Cannon, and Norro Wilson; fellow country artist and label mate Trisha Yearwood sings harmony vocals on the song. "Single White Female" was released on February 9, 1999, to radio via a2b Music, as the lead single and title track to Wright's fourth studio album Single White Female (1999) by MCA Nashville.

The song was a hit on the US Hot Country Songs chart where it spent one week at number one, notably ending the record-breaking eight-week reign of country group Lonestar's single "Amazed". It was also a success in Canada, topping the RPM Canadian Country Tracks and becoming the third most successful country song of 1999 in the country. The track proved to be the breakthrough for Johnson, as she would become a major songwriter and singer in her own rights with co-writes including "Downtime" for Jo Dee Messina and her own hits like "Complicated".

== Background ==
To promote the track, MCA Nashville created a newspaper-like advertisement entitled The Wright Times to be sent to radio and retail, which included a Chely Wright advice column, personal ads, and a crossword puzzle devoted entirely to Wright. The personal ads read, "SWF IS ISO country lover. Must be passionate and commitment minded for possible LTR. No followers. Leaders only. Tin ears need not apply."

== Content ==
"Single White Female", according to the sheet music published on Musicnotes.com, is performed in the key of F-sharp major, with a metronome of 96.

== Critical reception ==
Kevin John Coyne of Country Universe rated the track a B, calling the plot-line "slightly ridiculous" and that its main saving grace was Wright's charismatic voice and being "charming as hell."

== Chart performance ==
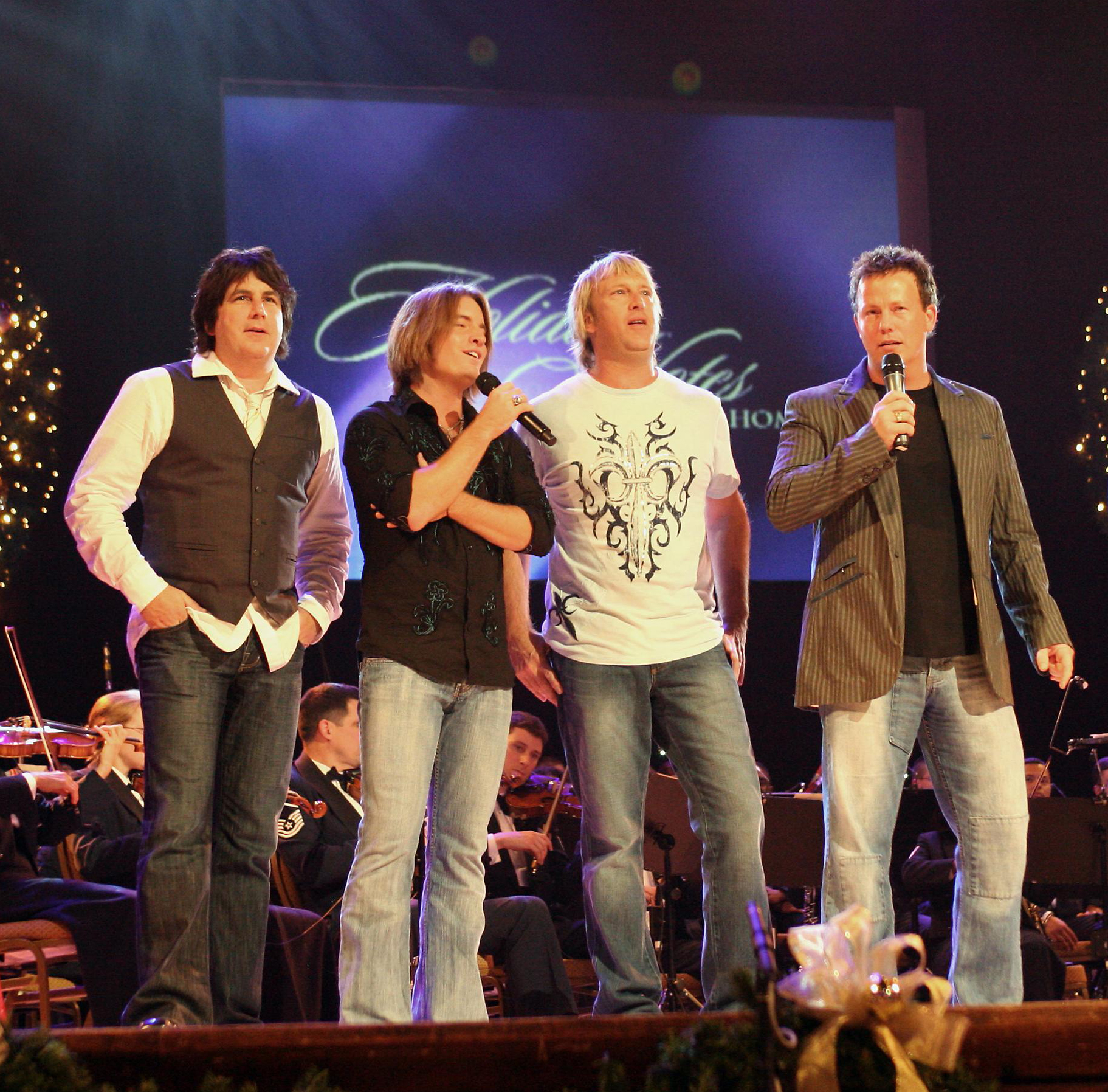
"Single White Female" displaced Lonestar's (pictured in 2007) 8-week number one single, "Amazed", from the top of the US Billboard Hot Country Singles & Tracks chart.

"Single White Female" entered the US Billboard Hot Country Songs chart at number 66 the week of March 13, 1999. It topped the chart on September 11, 1999 in its 27th week on the chart, famously ending country group Lonestar's eight week number one reign of their single "Amazed"; it was in stiff competition with Kenny Chesney's "You Had Me from Hello" for the top spot of the chart. It spent one week atop the chart and 31 weeks in total, becoming Wright's longest charting single to date. It is both her only number one and only top ten single. In April 2002, the track would receive a BDS Spin Award for 200,000 confirmed spins.

== Music video ==
Wright in the ACM-nominated music video for "Single White Female".

The music video for "Single White Female" was directed by Deaton-Flanigen Productions. It debuted to Country Music Television (CMT) on February 21, 1999. It was nominated at the 35th ACM Awards in 2000 for Video of the Year.

=== Synopsis ===
The music video takes place entirely on a city bus, with Wright performing by herself in the back of the bus, and in another scene with two backup singers and two guitarists while standing on the bus. In the beginning, it shows many of the bus's patrons, before moving to a "single white female looking for a special lover." A man gets on and eventually leaves the bus (having been seated in the row next to her and behind her, respectively) before he comes on a third time and sits next to her, where they glance at each other. The man eventually gets up, accidentally leaving his book on his seat. The woman grabs it and returns it to him, then they both walk off smiling at each other.

== Live performances ==
Wright performed the song at Capital Pride 2010 following her coming out. At the end of the song, she changed the lyric "lookin' for a man like you" to "lookin' for a girl like you" to enthused cheering from the audience.

== Personnel ==
Taken from the Single White Female album booklet.

- John Willis – acoustic guitar
- Dan Dugmore – acoustic slide guitar
- Steve Gibson – electric guitar
- Glenn Worf – bass
- Chad Cromwell – drums
- John Hobbs – keyboards
- Matt Rollings – B-3 organ
- Stuart Duncan – mandolin
- Trisha Yearwood and Melonie Cannon Richardson – background vocals

== Track listing and formats ==
US 7-inch, CD, and cassette single

1. "Single White Female" – 3:16
2. "Let Me In" – 3:58

European CD single

1. "Single White Female" – 3:17
2. "Shut Up and Drive" – 3:49
3. "Picket Fences" – 4:05

European cardsleeve CD single

1. "Single White Female" – 3:17
2. "Shut Up and Drive" – 3:49

US promotional single

1. "Single White Female" – 3:16
2. "Single White Female" – 3:16
3. "Single White Female" – 3:16
4. Research Hook – 0:10

== Charts ==
=== Weekly charts ===
Weekly chart performance for "Single White Female"
| Chart (1999) | Peak position |
|---|---|
| Canada Country Singles (RPM) | 1 |
| US Billboard Hot 100 | 36 |
| US Hot Country Songs (Billboard) | 1 |
| US Gavin Country (Gavin Report) | 1 |
| US Country Top 50 (Radio & Records) | 2 |

=== Year-end charts ===
1999 year-end chart performance for "Single White Female"
| Chart (1999) | Position |
|---|---|
| Canada Country Tracks (RPM) | 3 |
| US All-Format (Billboard) | 72 |
| US Country Songs (Billboard) | 12 |
| US Gavin Country (Gavin Report) | 14 |
| US Country (Radio & Records) | 22 |
