= Something in the Air (album) =

Studio album by Lila McCann
- Released: March 23, 1999
- Genre: Country
- Length: 43:04
- Label: Asylum
- Producer: Mark Spiro

Lila McCann chronology
Lila (1997)	Something in the Air (1999)	Complete (2001)

Singles from Something in the Air
- 1. "With You" Released: January 25, 1999; 2. "Crush" Released: July 26, 1999; 3. "I Will Be" Released: November 22, 1999; 4. "Kiss Me Now" Released: March 20, 2000

Professional ratings
Review scores
Source	Rating
AllMusic	3/5 stars

Something in the Air is the second album from American country music singer Lila McCann. Her second and final album for Asylum Records, it was released in 1999 and was certified gold by the RIAA. Four of its singles entered the Billboard Hot Country Singles & Tracks chart: "With You" (#9), "Crush" (#41), "I Will Be" (#47) and "Kiss Me Now" (#41). "With You" also hit the Billboard Hot 100, peaking at number 41, and became her first and only song to crossover in the U.S. "You're Gone" was originally slated as the album's first single, but was not released.

== Track listing ==
Something in the Air track listing
No.	Title	Writer(s)	Length
1.	"With You"	Robin Lee Bruce; Matt Hendrix	3:31
2.	"I Reckon I Will"	Lila McCann; Mark Spiro	3:51
3.	"Kiss Me Now"	Gary Burr; Spiro	4:01
4.	"I Will Be"	Bob Farrell; Tanya Leah	3:59
5.	"Go Girl"	Don Schlitz; Spiro	4:17
6.	"Rhymes With"	Mary Danna; Carolyn Dawn Johnson	2:51
7.	"You're Gone"	Steve Wariner; Bryan White	3:58
8.	"Crush"	Cathy Majeski; Sunny Russ; Stephony Smith	3:20
9.	"Something in the Air"	Michael Dulaney	4:14
10.	"Hit by Love"	Trey Bruce; Rebecca Lynn Howard	3:58
11.	"Can You Hear Me"	McCann; Spiro	4:03
12.	"When You Walked into My Life"	Ty Lacy; Arnie Roman	3:41
Total length:			43:04

== Personnel ==
- Mike Brignardello - bass (1, 3, 4, 6–8, 10, 12)
- Larry Byrom - acoustic guitar (1, 2, 4–12); nylon string rhythm guitar (3)
- Joseph Chemay - bass (1, 5, 9, 11)
- Eric Darken - percussion (4)
- Stuart Duncan - fiddle (2, 5, 9, 11)
- Paul Franklin - steel guitar (1–4, 6–12)
- Sonny Garrish - steel guitar (2, 5)
- Vince Gill - background vocals (3, 7)
- Rob Hajacos - fiddle (1, 7, 8, 10)
- Aubrey Haynie - fiddle (3, 4, 6–8, 10, 12)
- John Hobbs - piano (1–7, 9, 11, 12)
- Dann Huff - electric guitar (2, 5, 8, 9, 10, 11)
- Michael Johnson - steel guitar (1, 7)
- Paul Leim - drums (2, 5, 9, 11)
- B. James Lowry - nylon string guitar fills (3)
- Lila McCann - lead vocals, background vocals
- Terry McMillan - harmonica (1)
- Liana Manis - background vocals (9, 12)
- Steve Nathan - keyboards (3, 12); piano (8, 10)
- Tim Pierce - electric guitar (all)
- Mark Spiro - background vocals (2, 4, 5, 6, 8–11)
- Steve Wariner - background vocals (7)
- Bryan White - background vocals (7)
- Dennis Wilson - background vocals (7, 9)
- Lonnie Wilson - drums (1, 3, 4, 6–8, 10, 12)
- Curtis Young - background vocals (7, 9)

== Charts ==
=== Weekly charts ===
Chart (1999)	Peak position
Canadian Country Albums (RPM)	10
US Billboard 200	85
US Top Country Albums (Billboard)	5

=== Year-end charts ===
Chart (1999)	Position
US Top Country Albums (Billboard)	40
