= With You (Lila McCann song) =

Single by Lila McCann

from the album Something in the Air
- B-side: "When You Walked into My Life"
- Released: January 30, 1999
- Genre: Country
- Length: 3:31
- Label: Asylum
- Songwriters: Robin Lee Bruce; Matt Hendrix
- Producer: Mark Spiro

Lila McCann singles chronology
"To Get Me to You" (1998)	"With You" (1999)	"Crush" (1999)

"With You" is a song written by Robin Lee Bruce and Matt Hendrix, and recorded by American country music artist Lila McCann. It was released in January 1999 as the first single from her album Something in the Air. The song reached No. 9 on the Billboard Hot Country Singles & Tracks chart in June 1999, becoming her last Top 40 single to date. It was also McCann's only entry on the Billboard Hot 100, peaking at number 41.

== Chart performance ==
Chart (1999)	Peak position
Canada Country Singles (RPM)	7
US Billboard Hot 100	41
US Hot Country Songs (Billboard)	9

=== Year-end charts ===
Chart (1999)	Position
Canada Country Tracks (RPM)	52
US Country Songs (Billboard)	40
