= Boy Oh Boy (The Wilkinsons song) =

Single by The Wilkinsons

from the album Nothing but Love
- Released: March 30, 1999
- Genre: Country
- Length: 2:59
- Label: Giant
- Songwriters: Amanda Wilkinson; Steve Wilkinson
- Producers: Tony Haselden; Doug Johnson; Russ Zavitson

The Wilkinsons singles chronology
"Fly (The Angel Song)" (1998)	"Boy Oh Boy" (1999)	"The Yodelin' Blues" (1999)

"Boy Oh Boy" is a song recorded by Canadian country music group The Wilkinsons. It was released in March 1999 as the third single from their 1998 album Nothing but Love. The song reached number 3 on the Canadian RPM Country Tracks chart and number 50 on the U.S. Billboard Hot Country Singles & Tracks chart.

== Music video ==
The music video was directed by Deaton Flanigen and premiered in early 1999.

== Chart performance ==
Chart (1999)	Peak position
Canada Country Singles (RPM)	3
US Hot Country Songs (Billboard)	50

=== Year-end charts ===
Chart (1999)	Position
Canada Country Tracks (RPM)	12
