= Chad Klinger =

Canadian country music artist

- Origin: Lashburn, Saskatchewan, Canada
- Genres: Country
- Occupation: Singer-songwriter
- Years active: 1998–2013
- Label: CK
- Website: Official website

Chad Klinger is a Canadian country music artist. Klinger recorded his self-titled debut CD in Nashville in 1998, produced by Dean Sams of Lonestar. Two singles released from the project, "Who Needs the Moon" and "Bring It On," reached the Top 30 of the RPM Country Tracks chart. He took a break from his recording career in 2000 to enroll in the University of Alberta.

Klinger returned to the music business in November 2009 with the single "Minivan Man," which has reached the Top 50 of the Billboard Canadian Country Singles chart. His second album, The Man I Am Inside, was released in April 2010.

== Discography ==
=== Albums ===
Title	Details
Chad Klinger	Release date: 1999; Label: CK
The Man I Am Inside	Release date: April 16, 2010; Label: CK

=== Singles ===
Year	Single	Peak positions	Album
Year	Single	CAN Country	Album
1999	"Who Needs the Moon"	12	Chad Klinger
1999	"Bring It On"	23	Chad Klinger
2009	"Minivan Man"	—	The Man I Am Inside
2010	"The Night Ain't Over Yet" (with Gord Bamford)	—	The Man I Am Inside
2010	"I'm Gonna Be There"	—	The Man I Am Inside
2010	"Three Words Aren't Enough"	—	The Man I Am Inside
2011	"Beer Cans and Bonfires"	—	The Man I Am Inside
