= Bit by Bit (John Landry song) =

Single by John Landry

from the album Forever Took Too Long
- Released: 1999
- Genre: Country
- Length: 2:55
- Label: Spin
- Songwriters: John Landry; Rich Baker, Allan Lewis
- Producer: J. Richard Hutt

John Landry singles chronology
"There You Were" (1999)	"Bit by Bit" (1999)	"Which Way Is Love" (1999)

"Bit by Bit" is a song recorded by the Canadian country music artist John Landry. It was released in 1999 as the second single from his first album, Forever Took Too Long. It peaked at number 9 on the RPM Country Tracks chart on October 4, 1999.

== Chart performance ==
Chart (1999)	Peak position
Canada Country Singles (RPM)	9

=== Year-end charts ===
Chart (1999)	Position
Canada Country Tracks (RPM)	53
