= Lila McCann =

American country music singer (born 1981)

- Born: Lila Elaine McCann; December 4, 1981 (age 44); Puyallup, Washington, U.S.
- Origin: Steilacoom, Washington
- Genres: Country
- Instrument: Vocals
- Years active: 1997–present
- Labels: Asylum, Warner Bros., Broken Bow
- Website: lilamccannmusic.com

Lila Elaine McCann (born December 4, 1981) is an American country music singer who made her debut at age 15 with the single "Down Came a Blackbird." Reaching a peak of No. 28 on the Billboard Hot Country Singles & Tracks charts, the song was the first release from her 1997 album Lila, which became the highest-selling album for a debut country music act in 1997 and was certified platinum in the United States.

In 1998, McCann played Kelly Wyman, an aspiring country singer in the Walker, Texas Ranger episode "Eyes of a Ranger" on CBS.

McCann followed Lila with two more albums: 1999's gold-certified Something in the Air and 2001's Complete, before being dropped by her label in 2001. She signed to the independent Broken Bow Records label in 2005, releasing five singles for the label before being dropped in 2008. Overall, she has charted twelve singles on the Billboard country charts, with the highest-peaking being 1998's "I Wanna Fall in Love" at No. 3. Her second-highest peaking single, 1999's "With You", which reached No. 9 on the country charts and No. 41 on the Billboard Hot 100, her only entry on the latter chart.

== Biography ==
Lila Elaine McCann was born in Puyallup, Washington. She gave her first public performance at age four, when she sang "You Are My Sunshine" in her father's country music band. Later on, she became a local performer in her own right, singing in small venues around her hometown. By the time she was in her early teens, McCann recorded "Down Came a Blackbird", a song which was given to her by her manager, Kasey Walker. McCann's version of the song was sent to Seymour Stein, president of the Asylum Records label, who signed her to a recording contract in 1997.

== Career ==
=== 1997-1998: Lila ===
"Down Came a Blackbird" was issued in mid-1997 as the first single from her debut album, Lila; the song went on to peak at No. 28 on the Billboard country charts. Released in June 1997, Lila drew critical acclaim and comparisons to LeAnn Rimes. These comparisons stemmed from the fact that both singers, who were teenagers at the time, were recording material that was considered mature for their age. Lila was also the highest-selling album for a new country music act that year, earning platinum certification in the United States for shipments of one million copies. "I Wanna Fall in Love", the album's second single, became McCann's highest-charting single at No. 3 on the US country charts and No. 1 on the Canadian country charts. However, the third and fourth singles (a cover of Sheena Easton's "Almost Over You" and the Mark Spiro-Andrew Gold collaboration "Yippy Ky Yay", respectively) failed to make Top 40 in the US, although the former was a No. 38 in Canada. Later in 1998, McCann recorded a song titled "To Get Me to You" for the soundtrack to the movie Hope Floats. This song was released to radio, although it did not chart.

=== 1999-2000: Something in the Air and Complete ===
McCann's second album, Something in the Air, was issued in 1999. Originally slated as its lead-off single was "You're Gone", which featured harmony vocals from Vince Gill, Steve Wariner and Bryan White (of whom the latter two also co-wrote the song). This song was withdrawn before it could chart, however, and "With You" was its replacement. This song entered Top Ten on the country music charts, and peaked at No. 41 on the Billboard Hot 100, giving McCann her only entry on the latter chart. Something in the Air was certified gold in the United States; although three additional singles were released from it, none reached higher than No. 41 on the country music charts.

McCann's third album, 2001's Complete, was issued on Warner Bros. Records, due to the closure of Asylum Records's Nashville division which resulted in the transfer of Asylum's roster to the Warner Bros. label. Nineteen years old at the time of its release, McCann felt that the album marked an increased level of maturity in her work. The first single from Complete, "Come a Little Closer", reached a peak of No. 43 on the country music charts. After it came "Because of You", which failed to chart. McCann was dropped from Warner Bros.' roster in 2002, following the release of a Super Hits compilation which was composed of material from her previous albums.

=== 2005-2008: Switch to Broken Bow ===
On November 20, 2005, McCann married her boyfriend Mike Wolofsky in Nashville. Later that same year McCann signed to a new recording contract with Broken Bow Records, an independent record label. Although four singles were issued on the label between 2005 and early 2006, no album was released on Broken Bow during that timespan. A fifth single for Broken Bow, titled "That's What Angels Do", was shipped to radio in December 2007, and entered the country music charts at No. 60. McCann left Broken Bow Records in early 2008 and announced in October of the same year that she was expecting her and her husband's first child, Abraham Elliot (born December 15, 2008). In 2011, Lila and Mike had their second son Benjamin (born December 6, 2011), while she worked as a successful photographer, operating a photography business in the Nashville area.

=== 2016-present: Paint This Town ===
At the end of 2016, she started working on a new album through a PledgeMusic campaign. She released the new album Paint This Town on March 3, 2017, through the campaign as a download and physical copy for those who ordered it through the campaign. Then on August 18, 2017 she released it through iTunes.

On June 17, 2019, McCann posted on her official Instagram and Facebook pages that she has happily remarried a woman and is openly gay.

== Discography ==
=== Studio albums ===
Title	Album details	Peak chart positions				Certifications (sales threshold)
Title	Album details	US Country	US	US Heat	CAN Country	Certifications (sales threshold)
Lila	Release date: June 17, 1997; Label: Asylum Records; Formats: CD, cassette, music download	8	86	1	10	US: Platinum
Something in the Air	Release date: March 23, 1999; Label: Asylum Records; Formats: CD, cassette, music download	5	85	—	10	US: Gold
Complete	Release date: June 26, 2001; Label: Warner Bros. Nashville; Formats: CD, music download	18	152	—	—	
Paint This Town	Release date: March 3, 2017; Label: Lila McCann Music; Formats: CD, music download	—	—	—	—	
"—" denotes releases that did not chart

=== Compilation albums ===
Title	Album details
Super Hits	Release date: June 4, 2002; Label: Warner Bros. Nashville; Formats: CD, music download

=== Singles ===
Year	Single	Peak chart positions			Album
Year	Single	US Country	US	CAN Country	Album
1997	"Down Came a Blackbird"	28	—	40	Lila
1997	"I Wanna Fall in Love"	3	—	1	Lila
1998	"Almost Over You"	42	—	38	Lila
1998	"Yippy Ky Yay"	63	—	70	Lila
1998	"To Get Me to You"	—	—	—	Hope Floats (soundtrack)
1999	"With You"	9	41	7	Something in the Air
1999	"Crush"	41	—	42	Something in the Air
2000	"I Will Be"	47	—	76	Something in the Air
2000	"Kiss Me Now"	60	—	76	Something in the Air
2001	"Come a Little Closer"	43	—	—	Complete
2001	"Because of You"	—	—	—	Complete
2005	"Go Easy on Me"	53	—	—	—N/a
2005	"I Can Do This"	—	—	—	—N/a
2005	"I'm Amazed" (featuring Jim Brickman)	59	—	—	The Disney Songbook
2006	"Peace on Earth"	—	—	—	—N/a
2006	"God Bless the Children" (with Wayne Warner and the Nashville All-Star Choir)	—	—	—	Turbo Twang'n
2008	"That's What Angels Do"	60	—	—	—N/a
"—" denotes releases that did not chart

=== Music videos ===
Year	Video	Director
1997	"Down Came a Blackbird"	Norman Seeff
1997	"I Wanna Fall in Love"	Susan Johnson
1998	"Almost Over You"	Kevin McVey
1998	"Yippy Ky Yay"	Kasey Walker
1998	"To Get Me to You"	Eric Barrett
1998	"With You"	Steven Goldmann
1999	"Crush"	Steven Goldmann
2001	"Come a Little Closer"	Gerry Wenner

== Filmography ==
Year	Title	Role	Notes
1998	Walker, Texas Ranger	Kelly Wyman	Episode: "Eyes of a Ranger"
2002	Weakest Link	Herself	Episode: "Music Makers"
2003	Pyramid	Herself	Episode: "24 April 2003"
