= There You Were =

Single by John Landry

from the album Forever Took Too Long
- Released: 1999
- Genre: Country
- Length: 3:43
- Label: Spin
- Songwriters: John Landry; Fred Hale
- Producer: J. Richard Hutt

John Landry singles chronology
"There You Were" (1999)	"Bit by Bit" (1999)

"There You Were" is a song recorded by Canadian country music artist John Landry. It was released in 1999 as the first single from his debut album, Forever Took Too Long. It peaked at number 7 on the RPM Country Tracks chart in April 1999.

== Chart performance ==
Chart (1999)	Peak position
Canada Country Singles (RPM)	7

=== Year-end charts ===
Chart (1999)	Position
Canada Country Tracks (RPM)	87
