= All Things Considered (BBC radio show) =

- Running time: 28 minutes
- Country of origin: Wales, United Kingdom
- Home station: BBC Radio Wales
- Hosted by: Roy Jenkins; Peter Baker
- Website: All Things Considered homepage
- Podcast: All Things Considered podcast XML

All Things Considered is a British radio programme produced by BBC Radio Wales, which addresses topics concerning religion, morality and spirituality. Presented by Reverend Roy Jenkins and Peter Baker, the show airs Sundays at 8.31am and is repeated Wednesdays at 6.32pm.

== Awards ==
All Things Considered has won several awards, including the Andrew Cross Award for best British speech-based religious radio programme for four consecutive years, and the 2005 Sandford St. Martin Trust Merit Award for their show on meditation featuring prisoners at Cardiff Prison.
