= Nothing but Love (Standing in the Way) =

Single by The Wilkinsons

from the album Nothing but Love
- Released: 1999
- Genre: Country
- Length: 3:17
- Label: Giant
- Songwriters: Gary Burr; Steve Wilkinson
- Producers: Tony Haselden; Doug Johnson; Russ Zavitson

The Wilkinsons singles chronology
"The Yodelin' Blues" (1999)	"Nothing but Love (Standing in the Way)" (1999)	"Jimmy's Got a Girlfriend" (2000)

"Nothing but Love (Standing in the Way)" is a song recorded by Canadian country music group The Wilkinsons. It was released in 1999 as the fifth single from their debut album, Nothing but Love. It peaked at number 12 on the RPM Country Tracks chart in November 1999.

== Chart performance ==
Chart (1999)	Peak position
Canada Country Singles (RPM)	12

=== Year-end charts ===
Chart (1999)	Position
Canada Country Tracks (RPM)	95
