= Nothing but Love =

Studio album by The Wilkinsons
- Released: August 11, 1998
- Genre: Country
- Length: 37:49
- Label: Giant
- Producers: Tony Haselden; Doug Johnson; Russ Zavitson

The Wilkinsons chronology
Nothing but Love (1998)	Here and Now (2000)

Singles from Nothing but Love
- 1. "26 Cents" Released: June 16, 1998; 2. "Fly (The Angel Song)" Released: October 27, 1998; 3. "Boy Oh Boy" Released: March 30, 1999; 4. "The Yodelin' Blues" Released: 1999; 5. "Nothing but Love (Standing in the Way)" Released: 1999

Professional ratings
Review scores
Source	Rating
about.com	4/5 stars
Allmusic	2.5/5 stars

Nothing but Love is the debut studio album by Canadian country music group The Wilkinsons. It was released on August 11, 1998. The album won the 1999 Canadian Country Music Association award for Album of the Year.

== Critical reception ==
Nothing but Love received two and a half stars out of five from AllMusic, which called it "a terrific debut which banishes any concern that the Wilkinsons are simply a novelty act." The review stated that "The trio's vocals blend perfectly and Amanda, who sings most of the leads, has an outstanding voice." Rick Teverbaugh of Country Standard Time gave the album a favourable review, writing that "the end result is more pleasing than hokey, more honest than fabrication and more touching than cutesy." He added that "Steve Wilkinson is the writer and hits the mark more often than not" and "Amanda is clear-voiced and aided by the fact that she doesn't try too hard either to convince anyone she has lived through these songs or that she is capable of sounding older than her years."

Matt Bjorke of about.com gave the album four stars out of five, stating that "The Wilkinsons were instantly noted for their crystal clear harmonic vocals" and "if you like a group that sounds exquisite together, then you should check out The Wilkinsons' debut album." People picked the album as its Album of the Week for September 28, 1998, saying that The Wilkinsons "generate tight harmonies without sacrificing a lively sense of rhythm." Its review went on to say "all three Wilkinsons get to shine with lead vocals at some point here" and "good taste keeps the music unsullied and fun."

== Singles ==
Nothing but Love produced The Wilkinsons' first chart singles in "26 Cents" and "Fly (The Angel Song)", which respectively reached number 3 and number 15 on the Billboard Hot Country Songs chart. Both songs were number 1 country hits on the RPM Country Tracks chart in Canada. "Boy Oh Boy" was also released in both countries, reaching number 3 in Canada and number 50 in the U.S., while the U.S.-only "The Yodelin' Blues" reached number 45. Finishing off the single releases was the Canada-only "Nothing but Love (Standing in the Way)" at number 12.

== Track listing ==
No.	Title	Writer(s)	Length
1.	"26 Cents"	William Wallace, Steve Wilkinson	3:51
2.	"Boy Oh Boy"	S. Wilkinson, Amanda Wilkinson	3:02
3.	"Fly (The Angel Song)"	Rory Bourke, S. Wilkinson	3:43
4.	"Don't I Have a Heart"	Pat Bunch, Doug Johnson, S. Wilkinson	2:38
5.	"The Yodelin' Blues"	Skip Ewing	3:19
6.	"Nothing but Love (Standing in the Way)"	Gary Burr, S. Wilkinson	3:17
7.	"The Word"	Tony Haselden	3:40
8.	"Williamstown"	John Scott Sherrill, S. Wilkinson	3:54
9.	"Then There's You"	Pat MacDonald, Steve Seskin, Paul Young	3:44
10.	"Back on My Feet"	Bill LaBounty, Annie Roboff	3:32
11.	"One Faithful Heart"	Charlie Black, Bourke, S. Wilkinson	3:07

== Personnel ==
=== The Wilkinsons ===
- Amanda Wilkinson – vocals
- Steve Wilkinson – vocals
- Tyler Wilkinson – vocals

=== Musicians ===
- Joe Chemay – bass guitar
- Shannon Forrest – drums, percussion
- Sonny Garrish – steel guitar, dobro
- Tony Harrell – keyboards
- Tony Haselden – acoustic guitar
- John Hobbs – keyboards
- Tom Roady – drums, percussion
- Brent Rowan – electric guitar
- Will Smith – autoharp
- Biff Watson – acoustic guitar
- John Willis – acoustic guitar

== Charts and certifications ==
=== Weekly charts ===
Chart (1998–1999)	Peak position
Canada Country Albums (RPM)	4
US Billboard 200	133
US Top Country Albums (Billboard)	16
US Heatseekers Albums (Billboard)	4

=== Year-end charts ===
Chart (1998)	Position
US Top Country Albums (Billboard)	75
Chart (1999)	Position
US Top Country Albums (Billboard)	32

=== Singles ===
Year	Single	Peak chart positions		
Year	Single	CAN Country	US Country	US
1998	"26 Cents"	1	3	55
1998	"Fly (The Angel Song)"	1	15	53
1999	"Boy Oh Boy"	3	50	—
1999	"The Yodelin' Blues"	—	45	—
1999	"Nothing but Love (Standing in the Way)"	12	—	—
"—" denotes releases that did not chart

=== Certifications ===
Region	Certification	Certified units/sales
Canada (Music Canada)	Gold	50,000^{^}
United States (RIAA)	Gold	500,000^{^}
^{^} Shipments figures based on certification alone.
