= Yankee Grey =

American country music group

- Origin: Cincinnati, Ohio, U.S.
- Genres: Country
- Years active: 1986–2002
- Labels: Monument, Stonewall
- Past members: Matthew Basford; David Buchanan; Joe Caverlee; Kevin Griffin; Lyle Gudmunsen; Jerry Hughes; Tim Hunt

Yankee Grey was an American country music band from Cincinnati, Ohio. The band consisted of Tim Hunt (lead vocals), David Buchanan (bass guitar), Matthew Basford (lead guitar), Joe Caverlee (fiddle), Kevin Griffin (drums), and Jerry Hughes (keyboards). Founded in 1986, the band toured throughout the state of Ohio before being signed to a record deal with Monument Records in 1999. The same year, they made their debut on the Billboard country music charts with the Top Ten single "All Things Considered," followed by the release of their debut album Untamed, which produced two more hit singles on the country charts. After exiting Monument, the band signed to the independent Stonewall label in 2002.

== Biography ==
Yankee Grey was founded in Cincinnati in 1986 by drummer Kevin Griffin and guitarist Matthew Basford, steel guitarist David Carter, lead vocals and guitarist Coy Lee Jackson, and Bass Guitarist Dwayne Blankenship. Bass guitarist David Buchanan and lead vocalist Tim Hunt were added soon afterward, and the group began to perform in various bars and clubs around Cincinnati. Eventually, keyboardist Jerry Hughes and fiddle player Joe Caverlee were added as well, completing the band's lineup. After several years of playing local venues in Ohio, Yankee Grey was eventually spotted by an engineer who had connections to Nashville, Tennessee record producers. He then asked the band to record a demo tape; Cliff Audretch, Senior Director of Sony Music Nashville, heard the demo tape and traveled to Ohio to see them perform.

By 1997, the group was signed to Sony's Monument Records division. Their debut album Untamed was issued in late 1999, with Robert Ellis Orrall, Josh Leo, and Ronnie Thomas serving as producers. "All Things Considered," the first release from the album, reached a peak of No. 8 on the Billboard Hot Country Singles & Tracks (now Hot Country Songs) charts. In addition, Yankee Grey received a nomination for Best New Group or Duo at the Academy of Country Music awards that year.

The second single from Untamed, "Another Nine Minutes," peaked at No. 15 on the country charts in 2000; it was followed by "This Time Around," which failed to enter the Top 40. By the end of 2000, Yankee Grey had exited Monument's roster, and Tim Hunt had left the group's lineup due to vocal problems. After Hunt's departure, the band began a search for a replacement lead singer.

The group signed to an independent label known as Stonewall Records. Their second album, Yankee Grey 2, was issued in 2002, with keyboardist Jerry Hughes taking over as lead vocalist on the album. Later on, Lyle Gudmunsen was briefly signed on as lead singer. The band broke up shortly after Gudmunsen joined, and he began a solo career.

== Discography ==
=== Studio albums ===
Title	Album details	Peak chart positions		
Title	Album details	US Country	US Heat	CAN Country
Untamed	Release date: September 21, 1999; Label: Monument Nashville; Formats: CD, cassette	41	31	19
Yankee Grey 2	Release date: 2002; Label: Stonewall Music, Inc.; Formats: CD, cassette	—	—	—
"—" denotes releases that did not chart

=== Singles ===
Year	Single	Peak chart positions			Album
Year	Single	US Country	US	CAN Country	Album
1999	"All Things Considered"	8	54	16	Untamed
2000	"Another Nine Minutes"	15	74	23	Untamed
2000	"This Time Around"	43	—	67	Untamed
2000	"Untamed"	—	—	—	Untamed
"—" denotes releases that did not chart

=== Music videos ===
Year	Video	Director
1999	"All Things Considered"	David Abbott
2000	"Another Nine Minutes"	Chris Rogers
2000	"This Time Around"	David McClister

== Awards and nominations ==
Year	Association	Category	Result
1999	Academy of Country Music Awards	Best New Duo or Group	Nominated
