= All Things Considered (song) =

Single by Yankee Grey

from the album Untamed
- B-side: "Tell Me Something I Don't Know"
- Released: June 7, 1999
- Genre: Country
- Length: 2:40
- Label: Monument
- Songwriter: Tim Hunt
- Producers: Ronnie Thomas, Robert Ellis Orrall, Josh Leo

Yankee Grey singles chronology
"All Things Considered" (1999)	"Another Nine Minutes" (2000)

"All Things Considered" is a song written by lead vocalist Tim Hunt and recorded by the American country music group Yankee Grey, which was released in June 1999 as the leadoff single from the group's first album, Untamed. The song reached #8 on the Billboard Hot Country Singles & Tracks chart.

== Content ==
The song is about a man who expresses hope after undergoing a number of unfavorable events, such as his car breaking down, by stating that "all things considered, I'm doing just fine." Yankee Grey lead singer Tim Hunt says that he came up with the idea "in about twenty minutes" after becoming angry when his own car broke down. Alan Sculley of The Morning Call describes the song's sound as featuring vocal harmony, a "frisky beat", and "screaming electric guitar and fiddle".

== Critical reception ==
Chuck Taylor, of Billboard magazine gave the song a favorable review, saying that the song "grabs the listener by the ears from the first word and doesn't let go till the final note."

== Music video ==
The music video was directed by David Abbott.

== Chart positions ==
Chart (1999)	Peak position
Canada Country Singles (RPM)	16
US Billboard Hot 100	54
US Hot Country Songs (Billboard)	8

=== Year-end charts ===
Chart (1999)	Position
US Country Songs (Billboard)	66

Chart (2000)	Position
US Country Songs (Billboard)	69
