= 2000 in country music =

This is a list of notable events in country music that took place in the year 2000.

== Events ==
- February 28 -
- March 4 — "Amazed" by Lonestar becomes the first country song to have topped both the Billboard Hot Country Singles & Tracks and the Billboard Hot 100 chart since the Kenny Rogers-Dolly Parton duet, "Islands In The Stream" in October 1983. The country-leaning "Amazed" — which had a brief run in the Hot 100 during the summer of 1999 — had been remixed for Top 40 radio, launching it to its run of pop-radio success.
- March 7 - George Strait and Alan Jackson release "Murder on Music Row". While the song is not officially released as a single, the song stirs up controversy for its lyrics of how country pop is taking over traditional country music.
- March 10 — Vince Gill and Christian singer Amy Grant are married.
- March 13 - Dixie Chicks' "Goodbye Earl" gained significant controversy for citing domestic violence, urging the song to be withdrawn from radio airwaves.
- May 13 - Kenny Rogers makes chart history as "Buy Me a Rose" hits #1 on the Hot Country Songs chart, making it not only his first #1 since his 1987 duet with Ronnie Milsap, "Make No Mistake, She's Mine", but also the oldest singer to have a #1 single until 2003 (Rogers was 61 at the time). The song is also the only #1 for Alison Krauss and Billy Dean, who are credited as guest vocalists.
- May 13 June Carter Cash of Mother Maybelle and the Carter Sisters celebrates her 50th Grand Ole Opry anniversary
- October 26 - Garth Brooks announces his retirement from touring during a party to celebrate his certification for sales of 100 million albums, at Nashville's Gaylord Entertainment Center.
- December – RFD-TV, a cable network devoted to rural Americans culture, is launched. In addition to agriculture- and farming-centric shows, a large programming block is devoted to classic country music television shows.

== Top hits of the year ==
=== Singles released by American artists ===
US	CAN	Single	Artist	Reference
19	37	Almost Doesn't Count	Mark Wills	
15	21	Another Nine Minutes	Yankee Grey	
2	1	Back at One	Mark Wills	
8	11	Because You Love Me	Jo Dee Messina	
5	1	Been There	Clint Black with Steve Wariner	
19	12	Beer Thirty	Brooks & Dunn	
1	7	The Best Day	George Strait	
1	3	Best of Intentions	Travis Tritt	
6	3	Big Deal	LeAnn Rimes	
1	9	Buy Me a Rose	Kenny Rogers featuring Alison Krauss and Billy Dean	
5	1	Carlene	Phil Vassar	
3	6	The Chain of Love	Clay Walker	
10	7	Cold Day in July	Dixie Chicks	
3	1	Couldn't Last a Moment	Collin Raye	
4	3	Country Comes to Town	Toby Keith	
1	1	Cowboy Take Me Away	Dixie Chicks	
17	19	Daddy Won't Sell the Farm	Montgomery Gentry	
13	18	Do What You Gotta Do	Garth Brooks	
6	13	Feels Like Love	Vince Gill	
6	3	Flowers on the Wall	Eric Heatherly	
2	1	Go On	George Strait	
13	5	Goodbye Earl	Dixie Chicks	
1	1	How Do You Like Me Now?!	Toby Keith	
1	1	I Hope You Dance	Lee Ann Womack featuring Sons of the Desert	
3	21	I Lost It	Kenny Chesney	
8	16	I Need You	LeAnn Rimes	
2	3	I Will... But	SHeDAISY	
4	4	I'll Be	Reba McEntire	
1	4	It Must Be Love	Alan Jackson	
11	37	It Was	Chely Wright	
18	25	It's a Love Thing	Keith Urban	
5	11	It's Always Somethin'	Joe Diffie	
1	2	Just Another Day in Paradise	Phil Vassar	
22	10	Katie Wants a Fast One	Steve Wariner with Garth Brooks	
1	3	Kiss This	Aaron Tippin	
3	3	Lessons Learned	Tracy Lawrence	
6	5	Let's Make Love	Faith Hill with Tim McGraw	
20	26	Let's Make Sure We Kiss Goodbye	Vince Gill	
1	1	The Little Girl	John Michael Montgomery	
11	21	Live, Laugh, Love	Clay Walker	
18	24	Lonely	Tracy Lawrence	
3	2	Love's the Only House	Martina McBride	
18	21	Me Neither	Brad Paisley	
18	39	Meanwhile Back at the Ranch	The Clark Family Experience	
10	4	More	Trace Adkins	
1	4	My Best Friend	Tim McGraw	
15	32	My Love Goes On and On	Chris Cagle	
1	6	My Next Thirty Years	Tim McGraw	
20	23	One Voice	Billy Gilman	
3	4	Prayin' for Daylight	Rascal Flatts	
11	25	Put Your Hand in Mine	Tracy Byrd	
16	20	Real Live Woman	Trisha Yearwood	
11	20	She Thinks My Tractor's Sexy	Kenny Chesney	
2	2	She's More	Andy Griggs	
1	1	Smile	Lonestar	
12	5	Smoke Rings in the Dark	Gary Allan	
7	1	Some Things Never Change	Tim McGraw	
26	16	Stuck in Love	The Judds	
13	38	That's the Kind of Mood I'm In	Patty Loveless	
1	1	That's the Way	Jo Dee Messina	
10	19	There You Are	Martina McBride	
9	18	This Woman Needs	SHeDAISY	
3	9	Unconditional	Clay Davidson	
1	1	The Way You Love Me	Faith Hill	
20	27	We're So Good Together	Reba McEntire	
1	12	We Danced	Brad Paisley	
1	1	What About Now	Lonestar	
3	5	What Do You Say	Reba McEntire	
8	7	What I Need to Do	Kenny Chesney	
15	30	When You Need My Love	Darryl Worley	
6	26	www.memory	Alan Jackson	
1	1	Yes!	Chad Brock	
17	33	You Won't Be Lonely Now	Billy Ray Cyrus	
5	7	You'll Always Be Loved by Me	Brooks & Dunn	
4	20	Your Everything	Keith Urban	

=== Singles released by Canadian artists ===
US	CAN	Single	Artist	Reference
—	16	1999	The Wilkinsons	
—	8	Angeline	Sean Hogan	
—	4	Black Is Black	Amanda Stott	
—	18	Dream Vacation	Sean Hogan	
—	5	Forever Loving You	Julian Austin	
25	4	Georgia	Carolyn Dawn Johnson	
—	2	Horseshoes	Adam Gregory	
—	10	I Surrender	Michelle Wright	
—	14	I Will Be Loving You	Tara Lyn Hart	
17	4	I'm Holdin' On to Love (To Save My Life)	Shania Twain	
—	10	I'm Missin' You	Shirley Myers	
—	11	In the Middle of Something	Diane Chase	
34	11	Jimmy's Got a Girlfriend	The Wilkinsons	
—	3	Kind of Like It's Love	Jason McCoy	
—	6	Kiss 'Em All	Lace	
13	9	A Little Gasoline	Terri Clark	
—	16	Long Gone and Forgotten	John Landry	
—	14	More Where That Came From	Rick Tippe	
—	7	No One Hurts Me More Than Me	Chris Cummings	
—	7	One Beat at a Time	Jim Witter	
—	4	Only Know I Do	Adam Gregory	
—	8	Right Here, Right Now	Charlie Major	
30	3	Rock This Country!	Shania Twain	
—	14	Same Things	The Poverty Plainsmen	
—	5	Save Me	Tara Lyn Hart	
49	10	Shame on Me	The Wilkinsons	
—	12	Somebody to Love	Amanda Stott	
—	18	Something Undeniable	Lisa Brokop	
—	16	Sunny Day in the Park	Jamie Warren	
—	7	The Sycamore Tree	Paul Brandt	
—	4	Take the Money and Run	Julian Austin	
—	4	That'll Teach Her	Chris Cummings	
—	7	Tough as a Pickup Truck	Jim Witter	
—	15	True Love (Never Goes Out of Style)	Lace	
—	7	Walkin' in the Sunshine	Farmer's Daughter	
—	19	Walking Away with You	Diane Chase	
—	19	What My Heart Don't Know	Colin Amey	
—	5	When I Found You	Michelle Wright	
—	16	When You Say Jump	Rick Tippe	
—	11	You and Only You	Farmer's Daughter	
—	10	You Better Be Sure	Shirley Myers	
—	20	You're the One	J. R. Vautour	

== Top new album releases ==
US	CAN	Album	Artist	Record label
4		20 Greatest Hits	Glen Campbell	Capitol Nashville
	10	Back in Your Life	Julian Austin	ViK.
7		Blue Moon	Steve Holy	Curb
6	12	Born to Fly	Sara Evans	RCA Nashville
2	4	Brand New Me	John Michael Montgomery	Warner Bros.
10		Brand New Year	SHeDAISY	Lyric Street
1	1	Burn	Jo Dee Messina	Curb
4		Classic Christmas	Billy Gilman	Epic
1	1	Coyote Ugly Soundtrack	Various Artists	Curb
	5	The Days in Between	Blue Rodeo	Warner
8	18	Down the Road I Go	Travis Tritt	Columbia
24	6	dwightyoakamacoustic.net	Dwight Yoakam	Reprise
19	7	Everlasting Love Songs	Various Artists	UTV
8	4	Fearless	Terri Clark	Mercury Nashville
1	8	George Strait	George Strait	MCA Nashville
1	15	Greatest Hits	Kenny Chesney	BNA
1		Greatest Hits	Tim McGraw	Curb
13	5	Here and Now	The Wilkinsons	Giant
	9	Honky Tonk Sonatas	Jason McCoy	Universal
1	4	I Hope You Dance	Lee Ann Womack	MCA Nashville
1	5	Latest Greatest Straitest Hits	George Strait	MCA Nashville
9	37	Lessons Learned	Tracy Lawrence	Atlantic
4	6	Let's Make Sure We Kiss Goodbye	Vince Gill	MCA Nashville
	9	Milk Cow Blues	Willie Nelson	Island
	2	New Country 7	Various Artists	Warner
5	6	New Day Dawning	Wynonna Judd	Mercury/Curb
1		O Brother, Where Art Thou? Soundtrack	Various Artists	Lost Highway
2	6	One Voice	Billy Gilman	Epic
5	16	People Like Us	Aaron Tippin	Lyric Street
3	8	Permanently	Mark Wills	Mercury Nashville
3	14	Rascal Flatts	Rascal Flatts	Lyric Street
4	6	Real Live Woman	Trisha Yearwood	MCA Nashville
5	3	Red Dirt Girl	Emmylou Harris	Nonesuch
17	6	Swimming in Champagne	Eric Heatherly	Mercury Nashville
7	28	Tomorrow's Sounds Today	Dwight Yoakam	Reprise
9	8	Tracks	Collin Raye	Epic
5	8	Transcendental Blues	Steve Earle	E-Squared
	3	Ultimate Classic Country	Various Artists	Warner
	10	The Way I'm Made	Adam Gregory	Epic
1		When Somebody Loves You	Alan Jackson	Arista Nashville

=== Other top albums ===
US	CAN	Album	Artist	Record label
28		24-7-365	Neal McCoy	Giant
19		40 #1 Hits	Ronnie Milsap	Virgin Nashville
	18	Amanda Stott	Amanda Stott	Warner
11		American III: Solitary Man	Johnny Cash	Lost Highway
15	30	Big Funny	Jeff Foxworthy	DreamWorks Nashville
42		Big Mon: The Songs of Bill Monroe	Ricky Skaggs	Skaggs Family
45		Buddy & Julie Miller	Buddy & Julie Miller	Hightone
46		Coast to Coast	BR5-49	Arista Nashville
22		A Country Superstar Christmas III	Various Artists	Hip-O
17		Cowboy	Chris LeDoux	Capitol Nashville
19		The Elvis Presley Collection – Country	Elvis Presley	RCA
31		Faith in You	Steve Wariner	Capitol Nashville
36		The Fun of Your Love	Jennifer Day	BNA
	27	Furnace Room Lullaby	Neko Case	Mint
26		Greatest Fits: The Best of How Big a Boy Are Ya?	Roy D. Mercer	Virgin Nashville
18	18	Greatest Hits	BlackHawk	Arista Nashville
25		Greatest Hits	Bryan White	Asylum
43		Greatest Hits	John Berry	Capitol Nashville
	12	Greatest Hits/Souvenirs	Stompin' Tom Connors	EMI
42		Guitar Genius/Relaxin' with Chet/Nashville Gold	Chet Atkins	RCA Nashville
33		Hard Rain Don't Last	Darryl Worley	DreamWorks Nashville
26		The Hardest Part	Allison Moorer	MCA Nashville
48		Hillbilly Homebody: 27 Comedy Classics	Tim Wilson	Capitol Nashville
35		The Hits Live	Sawyer Brown	Curb
32		How Big a Boy Are Ya? Volume 7	Roy D. Mercer	Virgin Nashville
18		I'm Diggin' It	Alecia Elliott	MCA Nashville
26		If I Could Only Fly	Merle Haggard	Epitaph
18		II	The Kinleys	Epic
35		The Innocent Years	Kathy Mattea	MCA Nashville
34		Inspirational Journey	Randy Travis	Warner Bros.
25		Just Another Day in Parodies	Cledus T. Judd	Monument
34		King of Nothing	The Warren Brothers	BNA
	17	Lonesomeville	Chris Cummings	Warner
43		Love Songs	Collin Raye	Epic
18		Morning Wood	Rodney Carrington	Capitol Nashville
13		Nickel Creek	Nickel Creek	Sugar Hill
14		Now That's Awesome	Bill Engvall	BNA
23		Phil Vassar	Phil Vassar	Arista Nashville
19		Play It Loud	Chris Cagle	Virgin Nashville
16	16	The Judds Reunion Live	The Judds	Mercury/Curb
14		Shiver	Jamie O'Neal	Mercury Nashville
37		Still Country	Loretta Lynn	Audium
13	24	Southern Rain	Billy Ray Cyrus	Monument
13	24	Strong Heart	Patty Loveless	Epic
	15	String of Pearls: A Greatest Hits Collection	Prairie Oyster	ViK.
46		Super Hits	Mindy McCready	BNA
50		Super Hits	Travis Tritt	Warner Bros.
17		There You Go Again	Kenny Rogers	Dreamcatcher
11		This Christmas Time	Lonestar	BNA
38		TJM Prime Country Hits	Various Artists	Foundation
21	21	To Get to You: Greatest Hits Collection	Lorrie Morgan	BNA
49		The Ultimate Collection	Patsy Cline	UTV
17		Ultimate Country Party 2	Various Artists	Arista Nashville
33		Unconditional	Clay Davidson	Virgin Nashville
18	31	Where the Heart Is Soundtrack	Various Artists	BNA
17	21	Yes!	Chad Brock	Warner Bros.

== Births ==
- January 27 — Bailey Zimmerman, up-and-coming singer of the 2020s ("Fall in Love", "Rock and a Hard Place")
- March 5 — Gabby Barrett, rose to fame as third-place contestant in sixteenth season of American Idol, singer-songwriter of the 2020s ("I Hope", "The Good Ones")
- October 6 — Jackson Dean, up-and-coming country singer of the 2020s ("Don't Come Lookin'")
- November 10 — Vincent Mason, up-and-coming country singer of the 2020s ("Wish You Well", "Damned If I Do")

== Deaths ==
- March 7 — Pee Wee King, 86, singer-songwriter (heart attack)
- March 14 — Tommy Collins, 69, singer and songwriter who helped create the Bakersfield Sound
- March 19 — Speck Rhodes, 84, comedian and musician best known for his work on The Porter Wagoner Show.
- April 21 — Neal Matthews, Jr., 70, member of The Jordanaires (heart attack)
- November 5 — Jimmie Davis, 101, the "Singing Governor", two-term governor of Louisiana from 1944 to 1948 and again from 1960 to 1964 (natural causes)

== Hall of Fame inductees ==
=== Bluegrass Music Hall of Fame inductees ===
- Lance LeRoy
- Doc Watson

=== Country Music Hall of Fame inductees ===
- Charley Pride (1934-2020)
- Faron Young (1932–1996)

=== Canadian Country Music Hall of Fame inductees ===
- Colleen Peterson
- Leonard Rambeau

== Major awards ==
=== Grammy Awards ===
- Best Female Country Vocal Performance — "Breathe", Faith Hill
- Best Male Country Vocal Performance — "Solitary Man", Johnny Cash
- Best Country Performance by a Duo or Group with Vocal — "Cherokee Maiden", Asleep at the Wheel
- Best Country Collaboration with Vocals — "Let's Make Love", Faith Hill and Tim McGraw
- Best Country Instrumental Performance — "Leaving Cottondale", Alison Brown and Béla Fleck
- Best Country Song — "I Hope You Dance", Mark D. Sanders and Tia Sillers
- Best Country Album — Breathe, Faith Hill
- Best Bluegrass Album — The Grass Is Blue, Dolly Parton

=== Juno Awards ===
- Best Country Male Artist — Paul Brandt
- Best Country Female Artist — Terri Clark
- Best Country Group or Duo — The Wilkinsons

=== Academy of Country Music ===
- Entertainer of the Year — Dixie Chicks
- Song of the Year — "I Hope You Dance", Mark D. Sanders, Tia Sillers
- Single of the Year — "I Hope You Dance", Lee Ann Womack
- Album of the Year — How Do You Like Me Now?!, Toby Keith
- Top Male Vocalist — Toby Keith
- Top Female Vocalist — Faith Hill
- Top Vocal Duo — Brooks & Dunn
- Top Vocal Group — Dixie Chicks
- Top New Male Vocalist — Keith Urban
- Top New Female Vocalist — Jamie O'Neal
- Top New Vocal Duo or Group — Rascal Flatts
- Video of the Year — "Goodbye Earl", Dixie Chicks (Director: Evan Bernard)
- Vocal Event of the Year — "I Hope You Dance", Lee Ann Womack and Sons Of The Desert

=== ARIA Awards ===
(presented in Sydney on October 24, 2000)

- Best Country Album - Big River (Troy Cassar-Daley)

=== Canadian Country Music Association ===
- Chevy Fans' Choice Award — The Wilkinsons
- Male Artist of the Year — Paul Brandt
- Female Artist of the Year — Michelle Wright
- Group or Duo of the Year — The Wilkinsons
- SOCAN Song of the Year — "Daddy Won't Sell the Farm", Steve Fox, Robin Branda
- Single of the Year — "Jimmy's Got a Girlfriend", The Wilkinsons
- Album of the Year — Here and Now, The Wilkinsons
- Top Selling Album — Fly, Dixie Chicks
- Video of the Year — "That's the Truth", Paul Brandt
- FACTOR Rising Star Award — Tara Lyn Hart
- Vocal/Instrumental Collaboration of the Year — "Get Me Through December", Natalie MacMaster and Alison Krauss

=== Country Music Association ===
- Entertainer of the Year — Dixie Chicks
- Song of the Year — "I Hope You Dance", Mark D. Sanders, Tia Sillers
- Single of the Year — "I Hope You Dance," Lee Ann Womack
- Album of the Year — Fly, Dixie Chicks
- Male Vocalist of the Year — Tim McGraw
- Female Vocalist of the Year — Faith Hill
- Vocal Duo of the Year — Montgomery Gentry
- Vocal Group of the Year — Dixie Chicks
- Horizon Award — Brad Paisley
- Music Video of the Year — "Goodbye Earl", Dixie Chicks (Director: Evan Bernard)
- Vocal Event of the Year — "Murder on Music Row", George Strait and Alan Jackson
- Musician of the Year — Hargus "Pig" Robbins

== Other links ==
- Country Music Association
- Inductees of the Country Music Hall of Fame
