= The Wilkinsons discography =

Cataloging of published recordings by The Wilkinsos

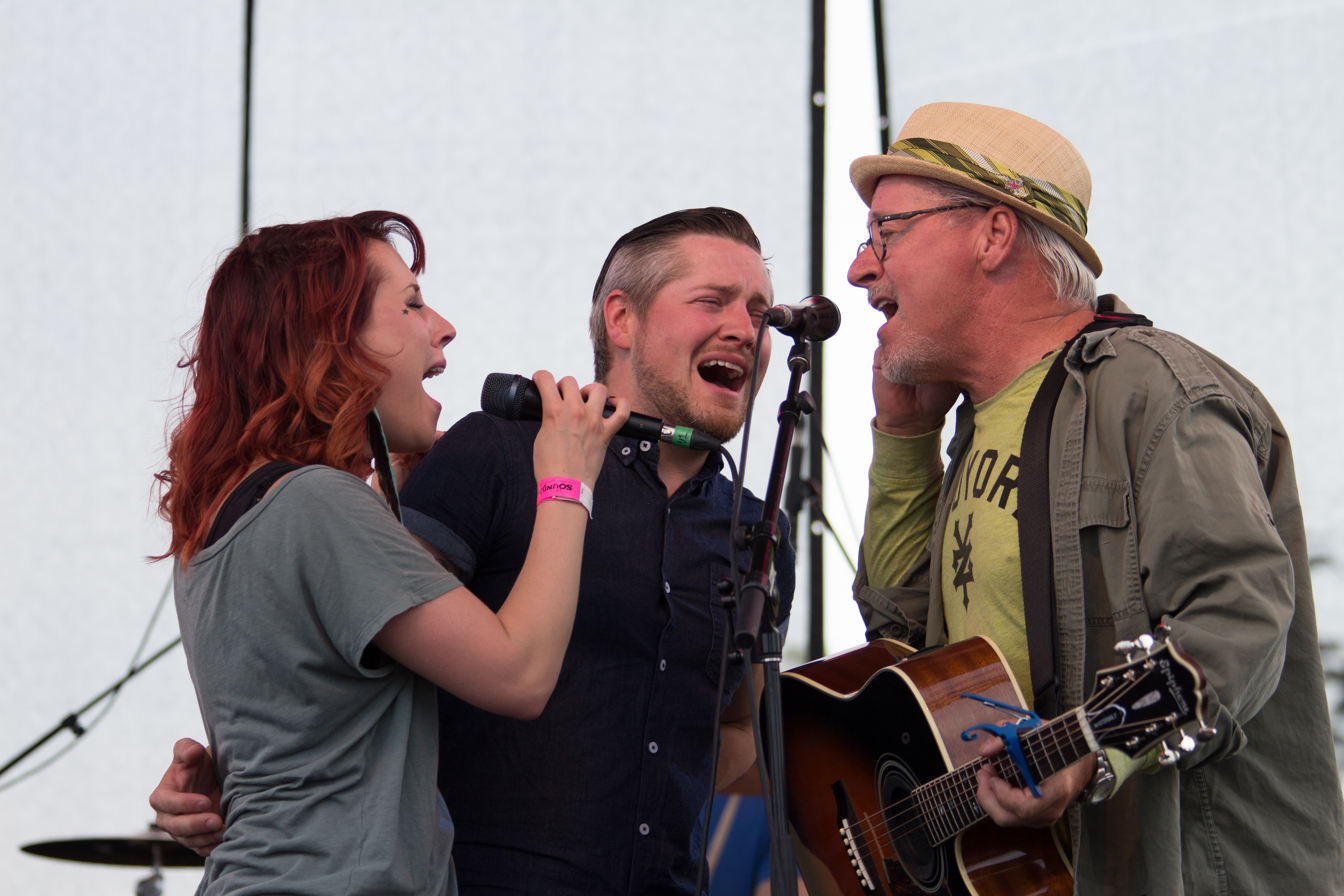
- Studio albums: 6
- Singles: 20
- Music videos: 14

The Wilkinsons were a Canadian country music trio. Their discography consists of six studio albums, 20 singles, and 14 music videos.

== Studio albums ==
Title	Details	Peak chart positions				Certifications
Title	Details	CAN Country	US Country	US	US Heat	Certifications
Nothing but Love	Release date: August 11, 1998; Label: Giant	4	16	133	4	CAN: Gold; US: Gold
Here and Now	Release date: April 4, 2000; Label: Giant	5	13	114	2	
Shine	Release date: 2001; Label: Giant	—	—	—	—	
Highway	Release date: March 29, 2005; Label: Open Road	—	—	—	—	
Home	Release date: March 20, 2007; Label: Fontana North	—	—	—	—	
Greatest Hits... and Then Some	Release date: October 7, 2008; Label: Angeline	—	—	—	—	
"—" denotes releases that did not chart

== Singles ==
Year	Single	Peak chart positions			Album
Year	Single	CAN Country (Note: Chart positions from RPM Country Tracks from 1998 to 2000, Radio & Records in 2004, and Canada Country from 2007 to present.)	US Country	US	Album
1998	"26 Cents"	1	3	55	Nothing but Love
1998	"Fly (The Angel Song)"	1	15	53	Nothing but Love
1999	"Boy Oh Boy"	3	50	—	Nothing but Love
1999	"The Yodelin' Blues"	—	45	—	Nothing but Love
1999	"Nothing but Love (Standing in the Way)"	12	—	—	Nothing but Love
2000	"Jimmy's Got a Girlfriend"	11	34	—	Here and Now
2000	"Shame on Me"	10	49	—	Here and Now
2000	"1999"	16 (Note: "1999" reached number 16 on the Canadian RPM Country Singles chart when RPM ceased publication.)	—	—	Here and Now
2001	"I Wanna Be That Girl"	×	51	—	Shine (unreleased)
2003	"L.A."	11	—	—	Highway
2004	"Little Girl"	22	—	—	Highway
2004	"Leaving Song"	—	—	—	Highway
2005	"Highway"	—	—	—	Highway
2006	"Six Pack"	—	—	—	Home
2006	"Fast Car"	—	—	—	Home
2007	"Papa Come Quick"	34	—	—	Home
2007	"Nobody Died"	23	—	—	Home
2008	"Closets"	—	—	—	Home
2008	"When I'm Old"	30	—	—	Greatest Hits… and Then Some
2009	"You Heal Me"	—	—	—	Greatest Hits… and Then Some
"—" denotes releases that did not chart "×" indicates that no relevant chart existed or was archived

== Music videos ==
Year	Video	Director
1998	"26 Cents"	Jim Shea
1998	"Fly (The Angel Song)"	Deaton Flanigen
1999	"Boy Oh Boy"	Deaton Flanigen
2000	"Jimmy's Got a Girlfriend"	Jim Shea
2000	"1999"	Eric Welch
2001	"I Wanna Be That Girl"	Deaton Flanigen
2003	"L.A."	
2004	"Little Girl"	Warren P. Sonoda
2004	"Leaving Song"	Warren P. Sonoda
2006	"Fast Car"	Margaret Malandruccolo
2007	"Papa Come Quick"	Margaret Malandruccolo
2007	"Nobody Died"	
2008	"When I'm Old"	
2009	"You Heal Me"	
