= Somewhere Inside =

Somewhere Inside may refer to:

- "Somewhere Inside" (Allure song), a song by Tiësto as Allure, featuring Julie Thompson
- Somewhere Inside (album), a 1996 album by Chris Cummings
  - "Somewhere Inside" (Chris Cummings song)
