= Beverley Mitchell (album) =

Studio album by Beverley Mitchell
- Released: January 23, 2007
- Recorded: 2006
- Genre: Country
- Length: 47:49
- Label: Daywind Records
- Producer: D. Scott Miller

Beverley Mitchell is the self-titled debut album from American actress and singer, Beverley Mitchell. It was released on January 23, 2007. She co-wrote eight songs for the album. The first single, "Angel", was released in late 2006. The album debuted at No. 30 on the Billboard Top Country Albums chart and No. 8 on the Heatseekers chart.

== Track listing ==
No.	Title	Writer(s)	Length
1.	"Heaven on Earth Down Here"	D. Scott Miller; George McCorkle; Jeff Carter	3:28
2.	"Rolling Down Sonora Avenue"	Beverley Mitchell; Miller	2:46
3.	"Walkin'"	Ed Hill; Shaye Smith	3:24
4.	"Someone Who Gets Me"	Mitchell; James Dean Hicks	3:21
5.	"Dream Like We're Gonna Live Forever"	Mitchell; Miller	3:25
6.	"What Am I Doing Here"	Michael Busbee; Gregory Becker	3:33
7.	"Black Is Black (Note: Canadian singer and songwriter Amanda Stott originally performed the song which was released on her self-titled debut album in 2000 and was written by Nikki Hassman, Scott Miller, and Even Stevens)"	Miller; Even Stevens; Nikki Hassman	3:29
8.	"A Girl's Just Got to Rock"	Mitchell; Marsha Mauney	2:45
9.	"Nothin' 'Bout Nothin'"	Mitchell; Miller	3:01
10.	"You Didn't Kiss Me"	Bob Regan; Gregory Becker	3:49
11.	"Angel"	Mitchell; Liz Hengber; Will Robinson	3:05
12.	"Good Girls"	Mitchell; Jim Weatherly; Philip Douglas	3:07
13.	"If It Ain't True (True Love)"	Miller; Hassman; Jennifer Kimball	3:53
14.	"The Ones Left Behind"	Miller; Sherri Sides	4:43
Total length:			47:49

- Track information verified from the album's liner notes.

== Personnel ==
- Lisa Cochran, Chip Davis, Jonell Mosser, Russell Terrell: Vocal Backing
- J. T. Corenflos, Chris Leuzinger, Kenny Vaughn: Guitars
- Mike Johnson: Pedal Steel
- Joe Spivey: Fiddle & Mandolin
- Mike Rojas: Keyboards
- Mike Brignardello: Bass
- Greg Morrow, Lonnie Wilson: Drums
- Tom Roady: Percussion

== Production ==
- Produced by D. Scott Miller
- Engineered by Adam Crawford, Patrick Murphy & Brian Reeves, with assistance from Jason "Recon" Coons
- Mixed by Kevin Beamish
- Mastered by Randy LeRoy

== Charts ==
Chart (2007)	Peak position
US Heatseekers Albums (Billboard)	8
US Top Country Albums (Billboard)	30
