= Erica Enders =

American drag racing driver

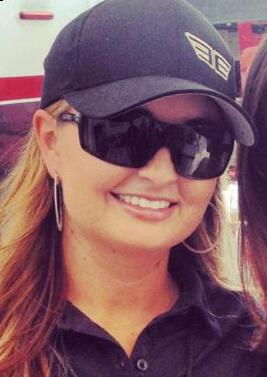
- Enders in 2013
- Born: Erica Lee Enders; October 8, 1983 (age 43); Houston, Texas, U.S.
- Spouse(s): Richie Stevens, Jr.
- Relatives: Courtney Enders

NHRA Mission Foods Drag Racing Series career
- Debut season: 2005
- Championships: 6 (PS)
- Wins: 50 (49 PS, 1 Sportsman)
- Fastest laps: Best ET; 6.450 seconds; Best Speed; 215.55 mph (346.89 km/h)

Championship titles
- 2014, 2015, 2019, 2020, 2022, 2023: NHRA Pro Stock Champion

Erica Lee Enders (born October 8, 1983 in Houston, Texas) is an American drag racing driver. Enders has won six world championships in the Pro Stock class of the NHRA Mission Foods Drag Racing Series and she continues to drive full-time in that class. For the 2024 season, Enders will defend her 6 NHRA Pro Stock World Championships.

== Career ==
Enders started racing in 1992 at the age of eight. Her original Enders Racing Junior Dragster car is on display at the Wally Parks NHRA Motorsports Museum.

In 1993, Enders won the Division 4 Jr. Dragster championship in the eight to nine year old class, and in 1995 she was named Junior Dragster Driver of the Year. In her eight years of junior dragster competition, she had 37 career wins.

In 2000, at the age of 16, she advanced to her first national event final in Houston to become the youngest NHRA national event finalist. She was named NHRA Sportsman Rookie of the Year.

In 2004, Enders became the 35th woman in NHRA history to earn a national event victory, in Super Gas class at Houston. In 2005, she became the first woman to compete in the NHRA's Pro Stock Category since 1993, the first woman in NHRA history to qualify in the top-half of a Pro Stock field, and the first woman to reach a final round in Pro Stock (at Chicago). Enders achieved more round wins in 2005 than all other female drivers in NHRA Pro Stock history combined, and was a finalist for the “Road to the Future” award for the season’s top rookie.

In 2006, Enders became the first woman to qualify No. 1 in Pro Stock (at Heartland Park, Topeka, Kansas), and recorded another runner-up finish at the Gatornationals in Gainesville, Florida.

After returning to Cagnazzi Racing in 2011, Enders broke the national speed record in Pro Stock at 213.57 mph (343.71 km/h) at the Gainesville round, and defeated 2004 NASCAR Sprint Cup Series champion Kurt Busch in Round One of that meet.

On July 2, 2012, Enders became the first woman to win in NHRA Pro Stock, beating four-time champion Greg Anderson in the finals at Route 66 Raceway in Joliet, Ill. Her winning time was 6.627 seconds for the 1,320 foot run.

In 2012, Enders finished a career best fourth in points in the Countdown to the Championship in NHRA Pro Stock and followed that up with a sixth-place finish in 2013.

It was announced following the 2013 season that Enders would leave Cagnazzi Racing and join Elite Motorsports for the 2014 NHRA Mello Yello Drag Racing Series, driving the team's new Camaro.

Enders currently holds both sides of the NHRA National Record for Pro Stock, 6.464 seconds and 215.55 mph (346.89 km/h), set at Englishtown, New Jersey in 2014.

Enders' pro stock car at Sonoma in 2026

In 2014, Enders became the first woman to win the NHRA Pro Stock World Championship, winning six races for the year (an NHRA event win requires winning four, consecutive wins over competitors drawn from the sixteen quickest cars at that event), including the season-ending Auto Club NHRA Finals to clinch the title.

In 2015, Enders broke two records for female NHRA drivers. At Charlotte's zMax Dragway in September, she scored her 19th career win, surpassing a record previously held by Shirley Muldowney in Top Fuel for the most NHRA national event wins by a female driver. At the Texas Motorplex in October, Enders-Stevens claimed her eighth victory of the year, breaking Pro Stock Motorcycle rider Angelle Sampey’s single-season record of seven wins in 2001.

Enders won the NHRA Pro Stock World Championship for a second straight year in 2015.

In 2018, Enders began driving a Pro Modified entry for Elite Motorsports, a twin turbo 2019 Camaro. She also holds the class record for fastest speed at 261 mph. In 2019, Enders barely escaped serious injuries when her Chevrolet Camaro caught fire at the end of a qualifying run in the NHRA Pro Mod class in Ohio.

== Personal life ==
Enders is the older sister of Courtney Enders, who was a junior dragster driver; they both attended Cypress Springs High School. After winning her first national event in Pro Stock, her longtime boyfriend Richie Stevens, Jr. (also a drag racer) proposed. The two were married on December 7, 2012.

== Film ==
In 2003, Enders and her sister had their life story turned into a Disney Channel Original Movie, Right on Track. Erica was portrayed by Beverley Mitchell, while Courtney was portrayed by Brie Larson.
