= Right on Track =

2003 Disney Channel original movie

- Promotional poster
- Genre: Biography; Drama
- Written by: Sally Nemeth; Bruce Graham
- Directed by: Duwayne Dunham
- Starring: Beverley Mitchell; Brie Larson; Marcus Toji; Jodi Russell; Jon Robert Lindstrom
- Theme music composer: Phil Marshall
- Original language: English

Production
- Producer: Don Schain
- Cinematography: Bob Seaman
- Editor: Jim Oliver
- Running time: 89 minutes
- Production company: Just Singer Entertainment

Original release
- Network: Disney Channel
- Release: March 21, 2003

Right on Track is a 2003 American biographical sports drama film released as a Disney Channel Original Movie. It was produced by Don Schain, directed by Duwayne Dunham, and written by Sally Nemeth and Bruce Graham. The movie debuted on March 21, 2003 on Disney Channel in the United States.

== Plot ==
Based on a true story about two sisters who came out on top of a man's sport, the story is based on Courtney and Erica Enders, two sisters who get into junior drag racing and make it all the way to the top. The two sisters fight a battle of fellow racers who are against having girls race with them; therefore, it pushes them harder to compete against their competition. Erica becomes stressed when her racing life becomes mixed with her social life and academic goals, and decided to quit racing, until she realizes racing is what she truly wants to do. Finally towards the end of their teen years the Enders sisters come out on top to win the NHRA Junior Dragster national title. They continue to race throughout high school and college, and still do so today.

== Cast ==
- Beverley Mitchell as Erica Enders
  - Ruby Chase O'Neil as Erica Enders, Age 4
  - Briana Shipley as Erica Enders, Age 8
- Brie Larson as Courtney Enders
  - Stefania Barr as Courtney Enders, Age 4
- Jon Lindstrom as Gregg Enders
- Jodi Russell as Janet Lee Enders
- Marcus Toji as Randy Jones
  - Lenny Betancourt as Randy Jones, Age 9
- Eric Jacobs as Bailey Brother
- Janice Power as Art Teacher
- J. Scott Bronson as Father (credited as Scott Bronson)
- Joey Miyashima as Mr. Jones
- Bradley Dutson as Jordy Knowlton
- William Osborn as Rusty Knowlton
- Teresa Richardson as Volleyball Coach

The Enders sisters also made appearances as driving and stunt doubles for Mitchell and Larson.

== Legacy ==
Erica turned professional in 2005, participating in the Pro Stock class of the NHRA Powerade Drag Racing Series, and on July 1, 2012, became the first woman to win in the class when she defeated Greg Anderson in a live televised final. Erica won the 2014 Pro Stock championship, defeating Jason Line in a winner-take-all final on November 16, 2014, at the NHRA Finals at Pomona. She was also named US "Racer of the Year" for 2014 by Autosport magazine. Erica clinched her second consecutive Pro Stock championship on November 1, 2015, at The Strip at Las Vegas Motor Speedway. Erica won her 3rd World Championship in November 2019 beating Chris McGaha in round 2 of the AAA World Finals in Pomona, CA, and repeated the honour in 2020. She is currently a Six-time NHRA Pro Stock Eliminator national champion.
