= Sure Enough =

Single by Chris Cummings

from the album Somewhere Inside
- Released: 1996
- Genre: Country
- Length: 3:12
- Label: Warner Music Canada
- Songwriters: Rick Scott; Frank Dycus; Chris Cummings
- Producers: Rick Scott; Jim Ed Norman

Chris Cummings singles chronology
"I Waited" (1996)	"Sure Enough" (1996)	"Somewhere Inside" (1996)

"Sure Enough" is a single by Canadian country music artist Chris Cummings. Released in 1996, it was the second single from his album Somewhere Inside. The song reached #1 on the RPM Country Tracks chart in August 1996.

== Chart performance ==
Chart (1996)	Peak position
Canada Country Singles (RPM)	1

=== Year-end charts ===
Chart (1996)	Position
Canada Country Tracks (RPM)	45
