= Small Town Pistols (album) =

Studio album by Small Town Pistols
- Released: February 19, 2013
- Genre: Country
- Label: 604
- Producer: David Kalmusky

Small Town Pistols chronology
Small Town Pistols (2013)	Pistology (2015)

Singles from Small Town Pistols
- 1. "Colour Blind" Released: April 30, 2012; 2. "Living on the Outside" Released: October 2012; 3. "Blame It on the Radio" Released: March 2013; 4. "Anthem of a Runaway" Released: July 2013

Professional ratings
Review scores
Source	Rating
Top Country	4.5/5 stars

Small Town Pistols is the debut studio album by Canadian country music group Small Town Pistols. It was released on February 19, 2013 by 604 Records. Its second single, "Living on the Outside," debuted on the Canadian Hot 100 in January 2013.

Small Town Pistols was nominated for Country Album of the Year at the 2014 Juno Awards.

== Critical reception ==
Henry Lees of Top Country gave the album four and a half stars out of five, writing that it is "polished, intriguingly diverse and confident even in its introspective moments" and "showcases two young artists who have developed into top calibre musicians and songwriters."

== Track listing ==
No.	Title	Writer(s)	Length
1.	"Colour Blind"	Joey Moi, Amanda Wilkinson, Tyler Wilkinson	3:43
2.	"Blame It on the Radio"	Danick Dupelle, A. Wilkinson, T. Wilkinson	4:14
3.	"Love Is Gonna Find You"	Jessie Farrell, A. Wilkinson, T. Wilkinson	3:41
4.	"Easy as Breathing"	Alyssa Bonagura, A. Wilkinson, Steve Wilkinson, T. Wilkinson	3:56
5.	"Living on the Outside"	A. Wilkinson, S. Wilkinson, T. Wilkinson	4:11
6.	"Anthem of a Runaway"	Patricia Conroy, A. Wilkinson, T. Wilkinson	3:53
7.	"Friends"	Jamie Robinson, A. Wilkinson, T. Wilkinson	3:22
8.	"It's You"	Jason "Slim" Gambill, A. Wilkinson, T. Wilkinson	3:18
9.	"Walk Tall"	Steve Bays, A. Wilkinson, T. Wilkinson	3:14
10.	"Peter Pan"	Bonagura, A. Wilkinson, T. Wilkinson	4:44
11.	"Mountain's Daughter"	Bonagura, S. Wilkinson, T. Wilkinson	8:22

itunes Edition
No.	Title	Length
12.	"Color Blind (Acoustic)" (bonus track)	3:50

== Chart performance ==
=== Singles ===
Year	Single	Peak chart positions	
Year	Single	CAN Country	CAN
2012	"Colour Blind"	—	—
2012	"Living on the Outside"	10	90
2013	"Blame It on the Radio"	27	—
2013	"Anthem of a Runaway"	22	—
"—" denotes releases that did not chart
