= Almost Always (Chris Cummings song) =

Single by Chris Cummings

from the album Somewhere Inside
- Released: 1997
- Genre: Country
- Length: 3:02
- Label: Warner Music Canada
- Songwriters: Chris Cummings; Rod Lewis
- Producers: Jim Ed Norman; Rick Scott

Chris Cummings singles chronology
"Somewhere Inside" (1996)	"Almost Always" (1997)	"The Kind of Heart That Breaks" (1997)

"Almost Always" is a song recorded by Canadian country music artist Chris Cummings. It was released in 1997 as the fourth single from his 1996 debut album, Somewhere Inside. It peaked at number 3 on the RPM Country Tracks chart in July 1997.

== Chart performance ==
Chart (1997)	Peak position
Canada Country Singles (RPM)	3

=== Year-end charts ===
Chart (1997)	Position
Canada Country Tracks (RPM)	8
