= Jordan McCloskey =

Canadian actor, comedian and writer (born 1979)

Jordan McCloskey (born October 2, 1979) is a Canadian actor, comedian and writer.

== Career ==
He began his career doing stand-up comedy at various venues, including Yuk-Yuk's comedy club. Eventually McCloskey moved into television roles, including Being Erica, The Jon Dore Show, Three Chords From The Truth and the Canadian Gemini award-winning mockumentary The Wilkinsons on CMT. He played the character Rusty Katz in 19 episodes of both The Wilkinsons and Three Chords From The Truth.

In 2009, Jordan won a Gemini for CMT's Three Chords From The Truth.

Currently, McCloskey can be seen in the Toronto Film Festival selected short film, Roland. He is also working on the highly anticipated horror/comedy movie GHOSTPUNCHER.

== Filmography ==
Year	Film	Role	Notes
2005-07	The Wilkinsons	Rusty Katz	9 Episodes
