= Black Is Black (Amanda Stott song) =

2000 song performed by Amanda Stott

Single by Amanda Stott

from the album Amanda Stott
- Released: 2000
- Genre: Country
- Length: 3:23
- Label: WEA
- Songwriters: Nikki Hassman, Scott Miller, Even Stevens
- Producer: Tom McKillip

Amanda Stott singles chronology
"Black Is Black" (2000)	"Somebody to Love" (2000)

"Black Is Black" is a song recorded by Canadian country music artist Amanda Stott. It was released in 2000 as the first single from her debut album, Amanda Stott. It peaked at number 4 on the RPM Country Tracks chart in May 2000.

The song was covered by Beverley Mitchell on her self-titled debut album in 2007.

== Chart performance ==
Chart (2000)	Peak position
Canada Country Singles (RPM)	4
