= Small Town Pistols =

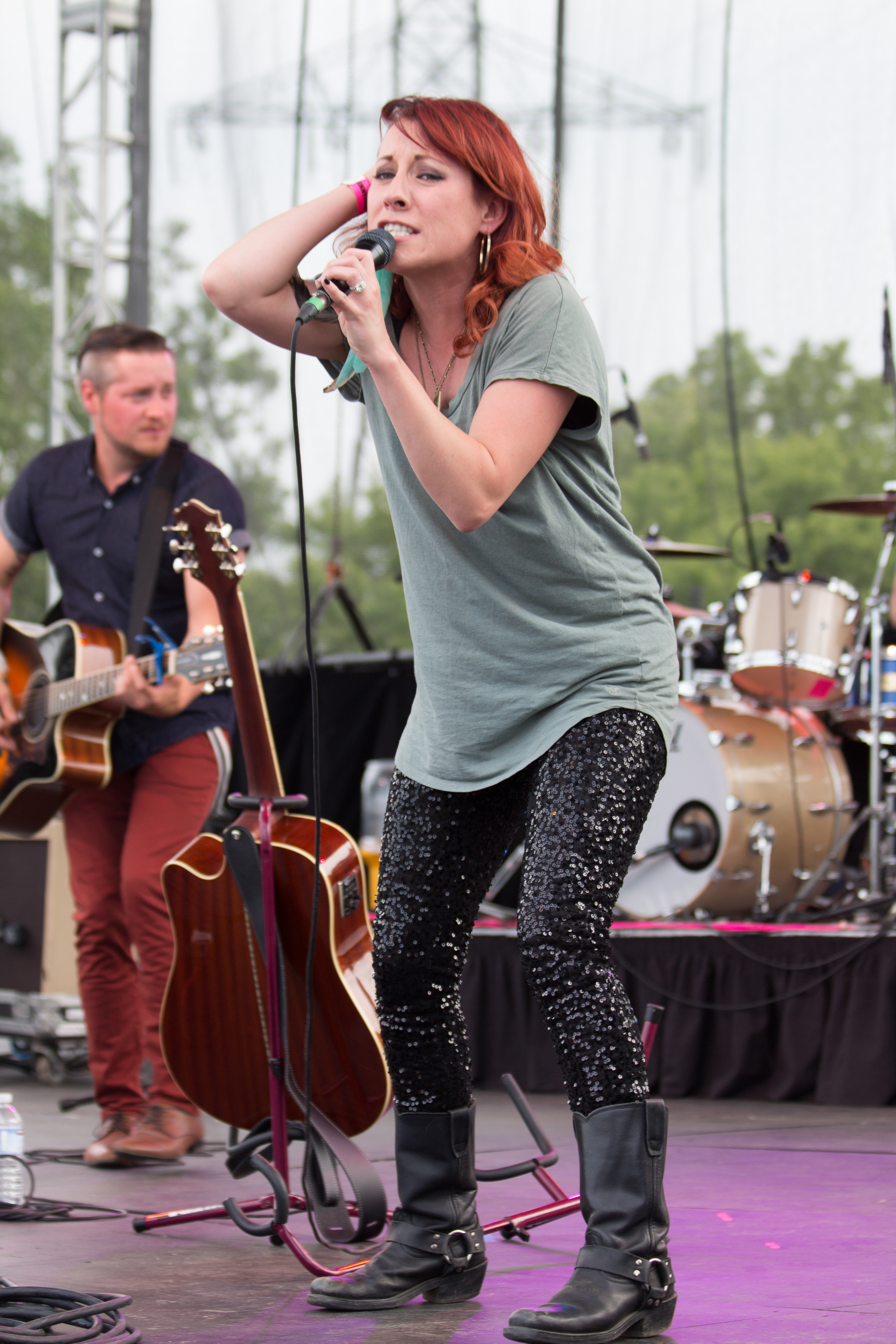
- Small Town Pistols, consisting of Amanda Wilkinson (front) and her brother Tyler (left), performing at the Sound of Music festival in Burlington, ON

Background information
- Origin: Trenton, Ontario, Canada
- Genres: Country
- Years active: 2012–2015
- Labels: 604
- Spinoff of: The Wilkinsons
- Past members: Amanda Wilkinson; Tyler Wilkinson

Small Town Pistols were a Canadian country music duo composed of Amanda and Tyler Wilkinson, formerly of The Wilkinsons.

The two siblings were each pursuing individual solo careers when they both went through difficult break-ups. That led them to start writing music together again with an eye towards pitching songs to other artists including Lady Antebellum. On listening to their new material they decided to perform it themselves. While they did discuss using the Wilkinson name for their new material, they decided to use a fresh name. The name Small Town Pistols is a reference to their having been "raised in a small town of like 14,000 people" while the Pistols is a reference to their grandmother Ida.

Their self-titled debut album was released by 604 Records on February 19, 2013. Its second single, "Living on the Outside," debuted on the Canadian Hot 100 in January 2013.

== Discography ==
=== Studio albums ===
Title	Details
Small Town Pistols	Release date: February 19, 2013; Label: 604 Records
Pistology	Release date: May 26, 2015; Label: 604 Records

=== Singles ===
Year	Single	Peak chart positions		Album
Year	Single	CAN Country	CAN	Album
2012	"Colour Blind"	14	—	Small Town Pistols
2012	"Living on the Outside"	10	90	Small Town Pistols
2013	"Blame It on the Radio"	27	—	Small Town Pistols
2013	"Anthem of a Runaway"	22	—	Small Town Pistols
2014	"I Only Smoke When I Drink"	38	—	Pistology
2015	"Can't Wait to Meet You"	30	—	Pistology
2015	"Jester in a Crown"	—	—	Pistology
"—" denotes releases that did not chart

=== Music videos ===
Year	Video	Director
2012	"Colour Blind"	John "JP" Poliquin
2012	"Living on the Outside"	Stephano Barberis
2013	"Blame It on the Radio"	Stephano Barberis
2014	"I Only Smoke When I Drink"	Stephano Barberis
2015	"Can't Wait to Meet You"	Stephano Barberis
2015	"Jester in a Crown"	Stephano Barberis

== Awards and nominations ==
Year	Association	Category	Result
2013	Canadian Country Music Association	Group or Duo of the Year	Nominated
2013	Canadian Country Music Association	Album of the Year – Small Town Pistols	Nominated
2014	Juno Awards of 2014	Country Album of the Year – Small Town Pistols	Nominated
2014	Canadian Country Music Association	Group or Duo of the Year	Won
2015	Canadian Country Music Association	Group or Duo of the Year	Nominated
