= Courtney Enders =

American NHRA drag racer

Courtney Enders-Hyde
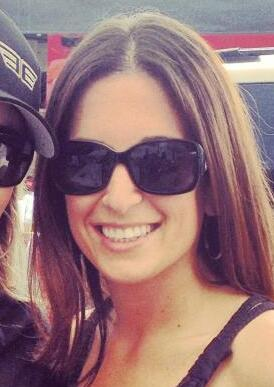
- Enders in 2013
- Born: Courtney Enders; November 14, 1986 (age 39); Houston, Texas, United States
- Spouse: Spencer Hyde
- Relatives: Erica Enders

Courtney Lee Enders-Hyde (born November 14, 1986) is an American former NHRA drag racer.

== Personal life ==
Enders is the younger sister of drag racer and six-time (2014, 2015, 2019, 2020, 2022 and 2023) NHRA Pro Stock drag racing champion Erica Enders. She attended Cypress Springs High School and drove a Jr. Dragster with her sister, Erica. In February 2026, Enders married Canadian NHRA Funny Car driver Spencer Hyde.

== Film ==
In 2003, Enders and her sister Erica had their life story turned into the Disney Channel Original Movie Right on Track. Courtney was portrayed by Brie Larson, while Erica was portrayed by Beverley Mitchell.
