= The Kind of Heart That Breaks =

Single by Chris Cummings

from the album Chris Cummings
- Released: November 22, 1997
- Genre: Country
- Length: 2:37
- Label: Warner Bros. Nashville
- Songwriters: Chris Cummings; Phillip Douglas; Kim Tribble
- Producers: Jim Ed Norman; Rick Scott

Chris Cummings singles chronology
"Almost Always" (1997)	"The Kind of Heart That Breaks" (1997)	"A Minute and a Half" (1998)

United States singles chronology
"The Kind of Heart That Breaks" (1997)	"I Waited" (1998)

"The Kind of Heart That Breaks" is a single by Canadian country music artist Chris Cummings. Released in late 1997, it was the first single from Cummings' album Chris Cummings. The song reached #1 on the RPM Country Tracks chart in February 1998 and #50 on the Billboard Hot Country Singles & Tracks chart.

== Chart performance ==
Chart (1997–1998)	Peak position
Canada Country Singles (RPM)	1
US Hot Country Songs (Billboard)	50

=== Year-end charts ===
Chart (1998)	Position
Canada Country Tracks (RPM)	49
