= A Minute and a Half =

Single by Chris Cummings

from the album The Kind of Heart That Breaks
- Released: 1998
- Genre: Country
- Length: 3:41
- Label: Warner Music Canada
- Songwriters: Chris Cummings; Rick Scott
- Producer: Jim Ed Norman

Chris Cummings singles chronology
"The Kind of Heart That Breaks" (1997)	"A Minute and a Half" (1998)	"Wild Wild West" (1999)

"A Minute and a Half" is a song recorded by Canadian country music artist Chris Cummings. It was released in 1998 as the second single from his extended play The Kind of Heart That Breaks and was also included on his American debut album Chris Cummings. It peaked at number 9 on the RPM Country Tracks chart in August 1998.

== Chart performance ==
Chart (1998)	Peak position
Canada Country Singles (RPM)	9

=== Year-end charts ===
Chart (1998)	Position
Canada Country Tracks (RPM)	76
