= Amanda Wilkinson =

Canadian musician

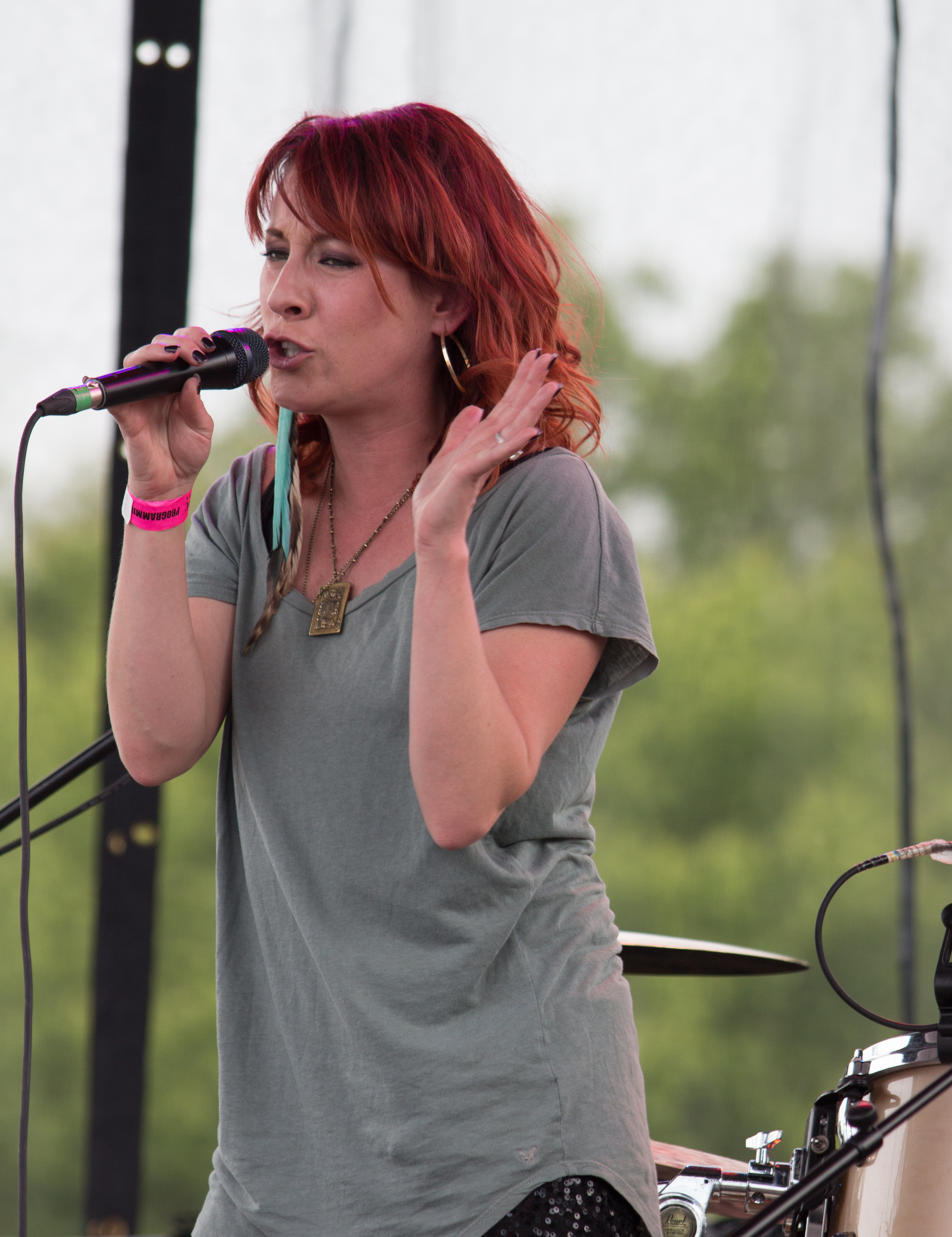
- Amanda Wilkinson, performing as part of Small Town Pistols, in concert at Burlington's Sound of Music Festival in 2012

Background information
- Born: Amanda Nicole Wilkinson; January 17, 1982 (age 44); Belleville, Ontario, Canada
- Genres: Country
- Occupation: Singer
- Years active: 1998 – present
- Label: Universal South
- Formerly of: The Wilkinsons; Small Town Pistols

Amanda Nicole Wilkinson (born January 17, 1982) is a Canadian country music singer. She was raised in Trenton, Ontario. She is best known for being a member of The Wilkinsons, a trio which also included her father Steve and brother Tyler. She has also recorded with Tyler in the duo Small Town Pistols and as a solo artist.

== Biography ==
Amanda Wilkinson was born in Belleville, Ontario, Canada. She is a member of the country group The Wilkinsons, which includes her father Steve and brother Tyler. She began singing early. Her dad inspired her. They first sang together at a family event and then continued singing together. In 1997, the Wilkinson family moved to Nashville. Their first single "26 Cents" was a success leading to Gold certifications in both the United States and Canada. Other albums The Wilkinsons have released include Here and Now (2000), Highway (2005) and Home (2007).

In 2004, Wilkinson began to sing solo, along with continuing to sing with the family. Her first solo album, Amanda Wilkinson, was released in 2005. In 2006, Wilkinson was nominated for Single of the Year, CMT Video of the Year, Female Artist of the Year and Album of the Year at the Canadian Country Music Awards.

In 2012, Wilkinson and her brother Tyler formed a new country group called Small Town Pistols. The first single they released was called "Colour Blind". Small Town Pistols released an album, Small Town Pistols, in Canada in February 2013.

== Discography ==
=== Albums ===
Title	Details
Amanda Wilkinson	Release date: September 6, 2005; Label: Universal South

=== Singles ===
Year	Single	Peak positions		Album
Year	Single	CAN Country	US R&R Country	Album
2003	"Gone from Love Too Long"	—	49	Amanda Wilkinson
2005	"No More Me and You"	12	—	Amanda Wilkinson
2006	"It's Okay to Cry"	10	—	Amanda Wilkinson
2006	"Walk Away"	15	—	Amanda Wilkinson
"—" denotes releases that did not chart

=== Music videos ===
Year	Video	Director
2005	"No More Me and You"	Warren P. Sonoda
2005	"It's Okay to Cry"	Margaret Malandruccolo

== Awards and nominations ==
Year	Association	Category	Result
2005	Canadian Country Music Association	Female Artist of the Year	Nominated
2005	Canadian Country Music Association	Chevy Trucks Rising Star Award	Won
2006	Juno Awards of 2006	Country Recording of the Year – Amanda Wilkinson	Nominated
2006	Canadian Country Music Association	Female Artist of the Year	Nominated
2006	Canadian Country Music Association	Album of the Year – Amanda Wilkinson	Nominated
2006	Canadian Country Music Association	Single of the Year – "It's Okay to Cry"	Nominated
2006	Canadian Country Music Association	CMT Video of the Year – "It's Okay to Cry"	Nominated

== Filmography ==
- The Wilkinsons (TV series) (2006) .... Herself

== See also ==
- The Wilkinsons
