= I Waited =

Single by Chris Cummings

from the album Somewhere Inside (Canada) Chris Cummings (US)
- Released: 1996 (Canada); March 24, 1998 (US)
- Genre: Country
- Length: 3:15
- Label: Reprise (Canada); Warner Bros. (US)
- Songwriters: Chris Cummings; David Latiolais
- Producers: Jim Ed Norman; Rick Scott

Chris Cummings singles chronology
"I Waited" (1996)	"Sure Enough" (1996)

United States singles chronology
"The Kind of Heart That Breaks" (1997)	"I Waited" (1998)	"'Til I See You Again" (1998)

"I Waited" is a song recorded by Canadian country music artist Chris Cummings. It was released in 1996 as the first single from his debut album, Somewhere Inside. It peaked at number 4 on the RPM Country Tracks chart in March 1996. The song was released in the United States in March 1998 as the second single from his American debut album, Chris Cummings, but failed to chart. It previously made an appearance on the 1996 Warner Music Group compilation New Country 3.

== Chart performance ==
Chart (1996)	Peak position
Canada Country Singles (RPM)	4
