= Lonesomeville =

Studio album by Chris Cummings
- Released: February 15, 2000
- Genre: Country
- Length: 33:30
- Label: Warner Music Canada
- Producer: Jim Ed Norman; Rick Scott

Chris Cummings chronology
Somewhere Inside (1996)	Lonesomeville (2000)	Ooh, That Could Cost Him the Gold, Bob! (2002)

Lonesomeville is the second studio album by Canadian country music artist Chris Cummings. It was released by Warner Music Canada on February 15, 2000. The album peaked at number 17 on the RPM Country Albums chart.

== Track listing ==
1. "That'll Teach Her" (Chris Cummings, Gary Burr) – 2:33
2. "A Little at a Time" (Cummings, Burr) – 3:30
3. "No One Hurts Me More Than Me" (Cummings, Rod Lewis) – 2:20
4. "Lonesomeville" (Cummings, Rick Scott, Phillip Douglas) – 4:04
5. "Temporarily Forever Mine" (Paul Thorn, Billy Maddox) – 2:37
6. "It Looks Like Pain" (Cummings, Scott, Patrick Howell) – 2:45
7. "Hammer and Nail" (Thorn, Maddox) – 3:19
8. "Sunday Best" (Cummings) – 3:11
9. "Uncle" (Cummings, Don Schlitz) – 2:40
10. "You Don't Say" (Cummings, Scott, Howell, Larry Dean Scott) – 3:14
11. "Home" (Cummings, Lewis, Tim Grogan, Greg Hayes) – 3:17

== Chart performance ==
Chart (2000)	Peak position
Canadian RPM Country Albums	17
