= New Zealand Hot Rod Association =

Umbrella organisation of NZ car clubs

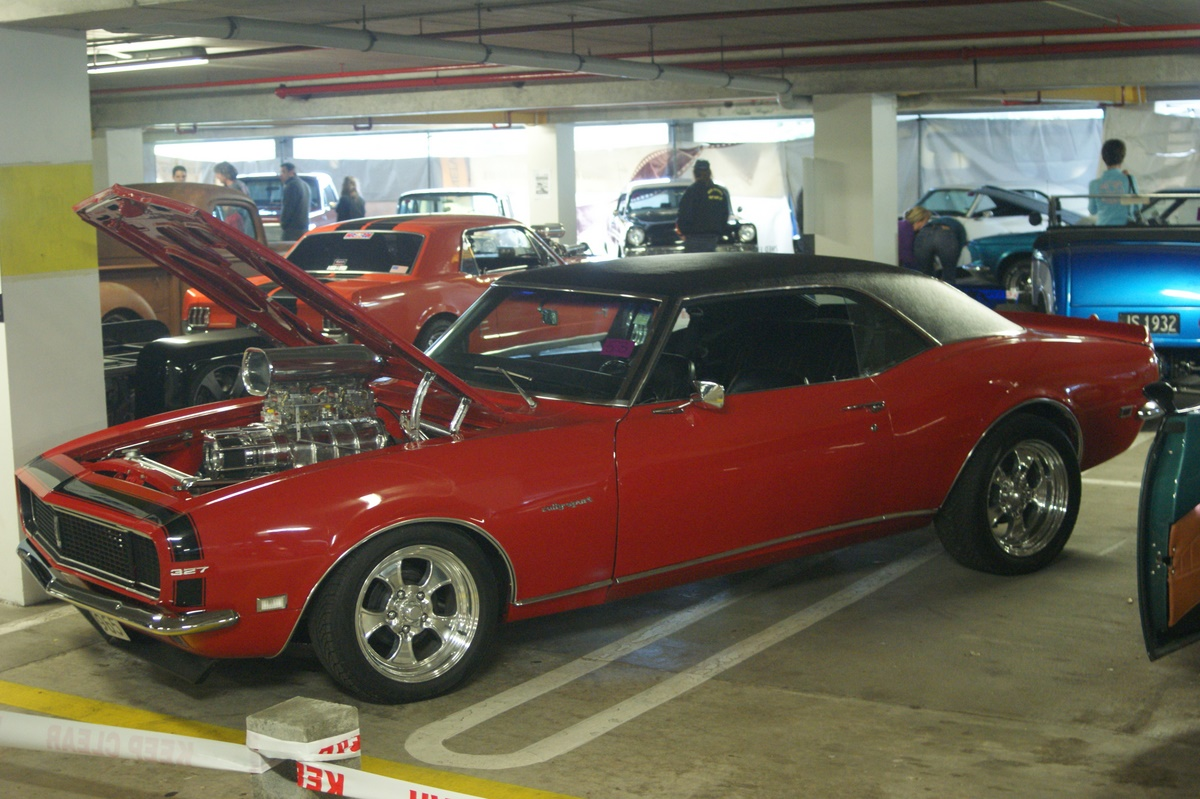
Street-legal rod at a 2009 NZHRA show

The New Zealand Hot Rod Association (Inc) or NZHRA is an umbrella organisation of hot rod clubs in New Zealand. The club describes its mission as:

encouraging and enhancing its members participation and enjoyment of safe Hot Rodding and its related activities, to foster the development, achievement and success gained through involvement with unique and individual automobiles and, in doing so, positively promoting the sport of Hot Rodding to those outside of our organisation.

== Origins ==
The NZHRA was founded in 1961 with the Mayor of Auckland City, Dove-Myer Robinson, as patron.

== Shows ==
The NZRHA organises annual hot rod shows in association with member clubs. The Street Rod Nationals have been held annually since 1997. Another of the regular events since 1994 is the Kumeu hot rod and classic car festival.

== Drag racing ==
The NZHRA began organising drag racing events in the mid-1960's. The first drag race occurred in 1966 at the Kopuku open cast coal mine. From 1993 drag racing fell under the auspices of the New Zealand Drag Racing Association.

== Speedshow ==
NZRHA clubs, Glen Eden's Harbour City Rod Club and Howick's Southside Streeters, organised a display of early hot rods at the 2012 CRC Speed Show. One of the significant cars on display was a 1919 Dodge bucket named Vandal. This rod had been built in the mid-1960's by Tauranga hot rod builder John (JR) Reid. Reid had gone on to found Rods By Reid, an internationally recognised award winning rod and customisation company based in Tauranga. The cars on display had been participating in the NZRHA's 50th Anniversary national hot rod show.

== LVVTA ==
At the instigation of NZHRA President Tony Johnson, the Low Volume Vehicle Technical Association (Inc) (LVVTA) was formed. Due to the New Zealand Government proposing to change vehicle certification legislation, Johnson worked with the Ministry of Transport to find a way to certify modified vehicles. The object was to allow hot rodding to continue and while at the same time provide a means to comply with changing motor vehicle safety measures.

The end result of this collaboration was the adoption of the NZHRA-written New Zealand Hobby Car Technical Manual as the legally accepted criteria for registration of all types of low-volume vehicles in New Zealand.

== Great Kiwi Rolling Rod Show 2020 ==
In a response to the Covid-19 lockdowns preventing static displays of custom cars and hotrods, Dean Taylor of the NZHRA associated Te Awamutu Rod and Custom Club suggested a series of rolling hot rod shows throughout the country in May 2020. NZHRA associated clubs that were reported as participating were Te Awamutu Rod and Custom Club, Egmont Rod and Custom Club, Whangarei Rod and Custom Club, Stragglers Cambridge, North Canterbury Rodders, Whitestone Rodders, Kustom Car Club, Street Machines Southland, Dargaville Rod and Custom Club, and the Tornado Rod and Custom Club. Sixty to seventy cars participated in the Te Awamutu portion of the event.

== Affiliated clubs ==
- Ashburton’s Americar Rod & Custom Club Inc
- Central Otago Rod and Custom Club
