= I'm Diggin' It =

Studio album by Alecia Elliott
- Released: January 25, 2000
- Genre: Country
- Length: 37:37
- Label: MCA Nashville
- Producers: Tony Brown, Jeff Teague

I'm Diggin' It is the only studio album by the American country music singer Alecia Elliott. It was released in 2000 by MCA Nashville. It peaked at No. 18 on the Billboard Top Country Albums chart. The album includes the singles "I'm Diggin' It" and "You Wanna What?"

== Production ==
The album was produced by Tony Brown and Jeff Teague. Elliott co-wrote two of the album's songs.

== Critical reception ==
Professional ratings
Review scores
Source	Rating
Albuquerque Journal	1/4 stars
AllMusic	3/5 stars
Detroit Free Press	1/4 stars
Los Angeles Times	3/4 stars
USA Today	2.5/4 stars

Country Standard Time wrote that "Elliott's a talented vocalist, but what she's chosen (or been given) to sing is perfectly forgettable and nearly free of country influence." Nashville Scene thought that "'I’m Diggin’ It' and the ridiculous 'You Wanna What?' position Elliott as the silly, superficial younger sister of Shania Twain." Time opined that "Elliott's warm voice brings out the melody in every track, deepening and personalizing her songs."

== Track listing ==
1. "Some People Fall, Some People Fly" (Matraca Berg, Randy Scruggs) – 3:00
2. "I Don't Understand" (Stephanie Bentley, Adrienne Follesé, Keith Follesé) – 3:17
3. "I'm Waiting for You" (Gary Baker, Alecia Elliott, Frank J. Myers) – 4:07
4. "Ain't No Ordinary Love" (Tommy Lee James, Robin Lerner) – 3:48
5. "Every Heart" (Michele McCord, Mark D. Sanders, Sharon Vaughn) – 3:40
6. "I'm Diggin' It" (Daryl Burgess, McCord) – 2:39
7. "That's the Only Way" (Cathy Majeski, Sunny Russ, Stephony Smith) – 3:22
8. "Say You Will" (Hunter Davis, Hillary Lindsey) – 3:38
9. "You Wanna What?" (Andy Bohatiuk, Elliott, Bill Terry) – 2:54
10. "Stay Awhile" (Mark Selby, Tia Sillers) – 2:57
11. "Some Say I'm Running" (Brent Bourgeois, Michael W. Smith) – 4:15

== Personnel ==
- Alecia Elliott: Vocal
- Thomas Flora, Tareva Henderson, Jennifer O'Brien, John Wesley Ryles, Harry Stinson: Vocal Backing
- Steuart Smith, Randy Scruggs, Jerry McPherson, Brent Mason: Guitars
- Steve Gibson, George Marinelli: Guitars, Mandolin
- Dan Dugmore: Guitars, Pedal Steel
- Larry Franklin: Fiddle
- Matt Rollings: Keyboards, Piano
- Steve Nathan: Keyboards, Organ, Piano
- Michael Rhodes: Bass
- Eddie Bayers, Paul Leim, Greg Morrow: Drums
- Tom Roady, Jeff Teague: Percussion

== Chart performance ==
Chart (2000)	Peak position
U.S. Billboard Top Country Albums	18
U.S. Billboard Top 200	172
U.S. Billboard Top Heatseekers	6
