= Somewhere Inside (album) =

Studio album by Chris Cummings
- Released: June 18, 1996
- Genre: Country
- Label: Warner Music Canada; Warner Bros. Nashville
- Producer: Jim Ed Norman; Rick Scott

Chris Cummings chronology
Somewhere Inside (1996)	Lonesomeville (2000)

Alternative cover
- Cover of U.S. release

Somewhere Inside is the debut studio album by Canadian country music artist Chris Cummings. It was released by Warner Music Canada on June 18, 1996. The album peaked at number 21 on the RPM Country Albums chart and was certified Gold by Music Canada in 1998.

An alternate version of the album, titled Chris Cummings, was released in the United States by Warner Bros. Nashville on February 24, 1998. This version replaces "Better Man Than I", "In Other Words" and "All Of The Above" from the original album with "'Til I See You Again", "The Kind of Heart That Breaks", and "A Minute and a Half".

"Little Sister’s Blue Jeans" was originally recorded by country music artist Doug Stone on his 1993 album More Love and "'Til I See You Again" was originally recorded by Kevin Welch on his 1990 self-titled debut album.

== Track listing ==
Somewhere Inside
No.	Title	Writer(s)	Length
1.	"I Waited"	Chris Cummings, David Latiolais	3:15
2.	"Better Man Than I"	Cummings, Frank Dycus, Rick Scott	4:24
3.	"Almost Always"	Cummings, Rod Lewis	3:02
4.	"Somewhere Inside"	Cummings	4:01
5.	"Little Sister's Blue Jeans"	Randy Boudreaux, Kim Williams	3:29
6.	"What About Me"	Cummings, Douglas, Scott	3:00
7.	"In Other Words"	Cummings, Latiolais, Scott	2:59
8.	"All of the Above"	Cummings, Troy Lancaster, Scott	3:23
9.	"Never Thought of You That Way"	Gary Burr, Don Schlitz	4:22
10.	"Sure Enough"	Cummings, Frank Dycus, Scott	3:12

Chris Cummings
No.	Title	Writer(s)	Length
1.	"I Waited"	Cummings, Latiolais	3:15
2.	"'Til I See You Again"	Kevin Welch	2:26
3.	"Almost Always"	Cummings, Lewis	3:02
4.	"Somewhere Inside"	Cummings	4:01
5.	"Little Sister's Blue Jeans"	Boudreaux, Williams	3:29
6.	"The Kind of Heart That Breaks"	Cummings, Phillip Douglas, Kim Tribble	2:37
7.	"What About Me"	Cummings, Douglas, Scott	3:00
8.	"A Minute and a Half"	Cummings, Scott	3:41
9.	"Sure Enough"	Cummings, Dycus, Scott	3:12
10.	"Never Thought of You That Way"	Burr, Schlitz	4:22

== Chart performance ==
Chart (1996)	Peak position
Canadian RPM Country Albums	21
