= The Poverty Plainsmen =

Canadian country music band

- Origin: Tilston, Manitoba, Canada
- Genres: Country
- Years active: 1987–present
- Labels: Poverty Records
- Members: Mark Smith; Sean Smith; Don Jorgensen; Brian Kelly; Anthony Kelly; Jayson Brinkworth
- Past members: Kurt Neis; Brad Johnson; Johnny Gasparic
- Website: www.thepovertyplainsmen.com

The Poverty Plainsmen is a Saskatchewan-based country music band, originating in smalltown Tilston, Manitoba, by brothers Sean Smith and Mark Smith in October 1987.

== Career ==
They have had a number one single on the country charts for their performance of "Sister Golden Hair," which is a remake of a pop hit from the 1970s by the group America. It was in the top 10 for eight weeks, and became the number one song for two weeks in Canada.

Since 1994 with the release of their album Gotta Be a Believer, they have done two more albums: There's No Looking Back (1999) and Lap of Luxury (2005).

On April 24, 2004, band member Sean Smith received a severe spinal cord injury. He is still currently in rehabilitation.

== Awards ==
- SCMA Group of the Year (1997, 1998, 2006)
- PMW Outstanding Country Recording (2000)
- CCMA Independent Vocal Group or Duo of the Year (2001)
- SCMA Video of the Year - "Same Things" (2001)
- CMW Independent Country Album (2001)
- SCMA Group or Duo of the Year (2002, 2003, 2005)
- SCMA Entertainers of the Year (2002)
- SCMA Single of the Year - "Time Will Tell" (2002)
- SCMA Achievement Award (2004)
- SCMA Single of the Year - "Everybody Say Eh!" (2005)
- SCMA Backup Band of the Year (2006)

== Discography ==
=== Albums ===
Year	Album
1994	Gotta Be a Believer
1999	There's No Lookin' Back
2005	Lap of Luxury

=== Singles ===
Year	Single	CAN Country	Album
1995	"Running Away"	67	Gotta Be a Believer
1996	"Old Man"	63	Gotta Be a Believer
1997	"Makin' Up for Doin' Time"	43	Gotta Be a Believer
2000	"Same Things"	14	There's No Lookin' Back
2000	"Never Enough"	30	There's No Lookin' Back
2001	"Lost in You"	*	There's No Lookin' Back
2001	"Time Will Tell"	*	There's No Lookin' Back
2002	"Eternal Love"	*	There's No Lookin' Back
2002	"After the Heartache"	*	There's No Lookin' Back
2003	"All I Figured Out"	*	There's No Lookin' Back
2003	"There's No Lookin' Back"	*	There's No Lookin' Back
2004	"Everybody Say Eh!"	*	Lap of Luxury
2005	"Sister Golden Hair"	*	Lap of Luxury
2005	"The Secret to My Success"	*	Lap of Luxury
2006	"Lap of Luxury"	*	Lap of Luxury
2006	"The Miracle Man"	*	Lap of Luxury
2007	"He's a Lot Like You"	*	Lap of Luxury
2007	"Rock on Farm Boy"	*	Lap of Luxury
