= Home (The Wilkinsons album) =

Studio album by The Wilkinsons
- Released: March 20, 2007
- Genre: Country
- Length: 49:10
- Label: Fontana North
- Producer: Steve Wilkinson; David Kalmusky; Russ Zavitson

The Wilkinsons chronology
Highway (2005)	Home (2007)	Greatest Hits... And Then Some (2008)

Home is the fifth and final studio album by the Canadian country music group The Wilkinsons, released on March 20, 2007. Five singles were released from the album: "Six Pack", "Fast Car", "Papa Come Quick", "Nobody Died" and "Closets".

== Track listing ==
1. "Fast Car" (Tracy Chapman) - 3:48
2. "Trees" (Steve Wilkinson, Rob Crosby) - 3:27
3. "Solitary Tear" (S. Wilkinson, Charlie Craig) - 3:26
4. "Closets" (S. Wilkinson, Gary Burr) - 3:42
5. "Papa Come Quick" (Billy Vera, Chip Taylor, Maurice Richard Hirsch) - 2:41
6. "I Wish It Would Rain" (S. Wilkinson, Craig) - 3:23
7. "Dying to Start Living" (S. Wilkinson, Crosby) - 3:39
8. "Home" (S. Wilkinson, Amanda Wilkinson, Tyler Wilkinson) - 3:39
9. "Six Pack" (S. Wilkinson, Tony Haselden) - 3:42
10. "I Want to Fall Asleep in Your Arms" (S. Wilkinson, Crosby) - 3:56
11. "Under the Rainbow" (S. Wilkinson, Crosby, Phillip White) - 3:16
12. "Big Pockets" (S. Wilkinson, Craig) - 3:32
13. "Thank You" (S. Wilkinson, William Wallace) - 3:53
14. "Nobody Died" (Haselden) - 3:06

== Album notes ==
- Track 7 performed by Tyler Wilkinson
- Tracks 9 & 12 performed by Steve Wilkinson
- Track 8 is a duet by Amanda Wilkinson & Tyler Wilkinson
- All other songs performed by Amanda Wilkinson

== Musicians ==
- Martin Aucoin – piano, synthesizer
- Craig Bignell – drums
- Joe Chemay – bass guitar
- John Dymond – bass guitar, shaker
- Larry Franklin – fiddle, mandolin
- Sonny Garrish – pedal steel guitar
- David Kalmusky – acoustic guitar, electric guitar, mandolin
- Jerry Kimbrough – bouzouki, acoustic guitar
- Steve O'Connor – piano
- Steve Smith – dobro, pedal steel guitar
