= Chris Cummings =

- Born: Christopher Allen Thomas Cummings; August 11, 1975 (age 50); Norton, New Brunswick, Canada
- Origin: Valley Waters, New Brunswick, Canada
- Genres: Country
- Occupation: Singer-songwriter
- Instruments: Vocals, Guitar, Banjo, Drums
- Years active: 1996–present
- Labels: Reprise, WEA Canada, Koch, Royalty Records
- Website: www.chriscummings.ca

Christopher Allen Thomas Cummings (born August 11, 1975) is a Canadian country music artist. In his career, he has released five studio albums, one compilation album, and one extended play. Several of his singles have charted on the Canadian country charts, including the Number One hits "Sure Enough" and "The Kind of Heart That Breaks".

== Biography ==
Chris Cummings began performing in 1980, at the age of five years. In 1990, Chris released an independent CD, which found its way to Reprise Records president Jim Ed Norman, who signed him on in 1992. At age 17, he was the youngest artist they had ever signed.

His first single, "I Waited," was released in Canada in the fall of 1995, and shot into the top 5. Produced by Jim Ed Norman and Rick Scott, Chris released his debut CD, Somewhere Inside, on June 18, 1996. The second single, "Sure Enough," went straight to No. 1. Follow-up songs "Somewhere Inside" and "Almost Always" also reached the top 5 in Canada reaching No. 3 and No. 4 respectively, and the album was certified gold.

Chris' second CD, Chris Cummings, was released in both the United States and Canada on February 24, 1998. Since 7 of the songs were already on Chris' Canadian debut, Reprise released an EP in Canada (The Kind Of Heart That Breaks) in 1997 containing the 3 new songs, along with "Lonesomeville" and an acoustic version of "Somewhere Inside." The first single released from the project was "The Kind of Heart That Breaks." While the song went to No. 1 in Canada, it stalled at No. 50 on Billboard in the U.S. The American follow-up single, "I Waited," failed to chart. Meanwhile, Chris returned to the Canadian top 10 with "A Minute And A Half."

Chris was transferred to WEA Canada for the release of his third CD, Lonesomeville. The disc was released on February 15, 2000. The first two singles, "That'll Teach Her" reached No. 4 on the charts with the second single "No One Hurts Me More Than Me," reached No. 7 in Canada. The final single, "A Little At A Time" entered the top 20 charts landing at No. 19.

Chris released his fourth CD, Ooh, That Could Cost Him the Gold, Bob! on March 26, 2002. He continued his string of hits in Canada with songs like "Cowboy Hats," "Betty," and "Benefit Of Doubt."

Chris' Greatest Hits package was released on April 27, 2004. Singles released from the album included "Lucy Got Lucky" and "Not Again." Chris left Warner at the end of 2004 for more control over his career.

Chris signed with Koch Entertainment in 2006. Chris' first album for Koch, Who Says You Can't?, was released on October 17. Chris had a hand in producing the album, which brought him back to the Canadian top 30 with the songs "Dixie Beauxderaunt," "For The Music," "Love Is Fine," "In The Nicest Way," and the last single, "Hey What You Know" released in July 2008.

Returning to his home Province of New Brunswick in mid-2007 after being gone since the age of 17 living in California, Tennessee, Ontario and Alberta, he took on a special project. Chris partnered with a local organization to record the John Sebastian hit "Welcome Back", a song that Cummings saw as a perfect "anthem" for the city and entire Province of New Brunswick. In addition, he decided to shoot the video for it in the city of Saint John the communities that surround it. In the summer of 2008 he was named an "Ambassador for the Province of New Brunswick" by Premier, Shawn Graham.

Chris signed with Royalty Records in April 2010 for his newest CD entitled Give Me Tonight The first single "Heart Like A Stone" was released online and to Canadian country radio on May 17, 2010, and the CD was released on September 21, 2010. Released at the same time as the new CD, the follow-up single "Leavings Not An Option" had special meaning for Chris as he co-wrote it with one of his long-time songwriting mentors Don Schlitz (one of three Schlitz co-writes on the new CD), the single was well received at radio returning Chris to the forefront of the Canadian country music scene.

== Discography ==
=== Studio albums ===
Title	Details	Peak positions	Certifications
Title	Details	CAN Country	Certifications
Somewhere Inside (Note: Re-issued in the U.S. as Chris Cummings by Warner Bros. Nashville on February 24, 1998.)	Release date: June 18, 1996; Label: Warner Music Canada	21	CAN: Gold
Lonesomeville	Release date: February 15, 2000; Label: Warner Music Canada	17	
Ooh, That Could Cost Him the Gold, Bob!	Release date: March 26, 2002; Label: Warner Music Canada	—	
Who Says You Can't?	Release date: October 17, 2006; Label: Koch Records	—	
Give Me Tonight	Release date: September 21, 2010; Label: Royalty Records	—	
"—" denotes releases that did not chart

=== Compilation albums ===
Title	Details
Greatest Hits	Release date: April 27, 2004; Label: Warner Music Canada

=== Extended plays ===
Title	Details
The Kind of Heart That Breaks	Release date: November 11, 1997; Label: Warner Music Canada

=== Singles ===
Year	Single	Peak positions	Album
Year	Single	CAN Country	Album
1996	"I Waited"	4	Somewhere Inside
1996	"Sure Enough"	1	Somewhere Inside
1996	"Somewhere Inside"	4	Somewhere Inside
1997	"Almost Always"	3	Somewhere Inside
1997	"The Kind of Heart That Breaks" (Note: "The Kind of Heart That Breaks" peaked at number 50 on the Billboard Hot Country Songs chart in the U.S.)	1	Chris Cummings / The Kind of Heart That Breaks
1998	"I Waited" (US release)	—	Chris Cummings
1998	"A Minute and a Half"	9	The Kind of Heart That Breaks
1998	"'Til I See You Again"	—	Chris Cummings
1999	"Wild Wild West"	12	Stampede Country
2000	"That'll Teach Her"	4	Lonesomeville
2000	"No One Hurts Me More Than Me"	7	Lonesomeville
2000	"A Little at a Time"	45 (Note: "A Little at a Time" reached number 45 when RPM ceased publication in November 2000.)	Lonesomeville
2001	"Sunday Best"	×	Lonesomeville
2002	"Cowboy Hats"	×	Ooh, That Could Cost Him the Gold, Bob!
2002	"Betty"	×	Ooh, That Could Cost Him the Gold, Bob!
2002	"Benefit of Doubt"	×	Ooh, That Could Cost Him the Gold, Bob!
2003	"Pamela Anderson Is in My Bedroom"	×	Ooh, That Could Cost Him the Gold, Bob!
2003	"I Get That a Lot"	×	Ooh, That Could Cost Him the Gold, Bob!
2004	"Lucy Got Lucky"	15	Greatest Hits
2004	"Not Again"	18	Greatest Hits
2006	"Dixie Beauxderaunt"	26	Who Says You Can't?
2006	"For the Music"	19	Who Says You Can't?
2007	"Love Is Fine"	—	Who Says You Can't?
2007	"In the Nicest Way"	38	Who Says You Can't?
2008	"Hey What You Know"	—	Who Says You Can't?
2009	"Welcome Back"	—	Give Me Tonight
2010	"Heart Like a Stone"	—	Give Me Tonight
2010	"Leaving's Not an Option"	27	Give Me Tonight
2011	"Give Me Tonight"	—	Give Me Tonight
2011	"Looking for a Sign"	—	Give Me Tonight
2012	"Till I See You Smile"	—	Give Me Tonight
"—" denotes releases that did not chart "×" indicates that no relevant chart existed or was archived

=== Music videos ===
Year	Video	Director
1996	"I Waited"	David Abbott
1996	"Sure Enough"	David Abbott
1996	"Somewhere Inside"	Charlie Cahill
1997	"The Kind of Heart That Breaks"	Martin Kahan
1998	"I Waited" (US version)	Steven R. Monroe
2000	"That'll Teach Her"	Scott Handelman
2002	"Cowboy Hats"	Warren P. Sonoda
2002	"Benefit of Doubt"	Warren P. Sonoda
2004	"Lucy Got Lucky"	Warren P. Sonoda
2006	"Dixie Beauxderaunt"	Warren P. Sonoda
2009	"Welcome Back"	Warren P. Sonoda
