= Diane Chase =

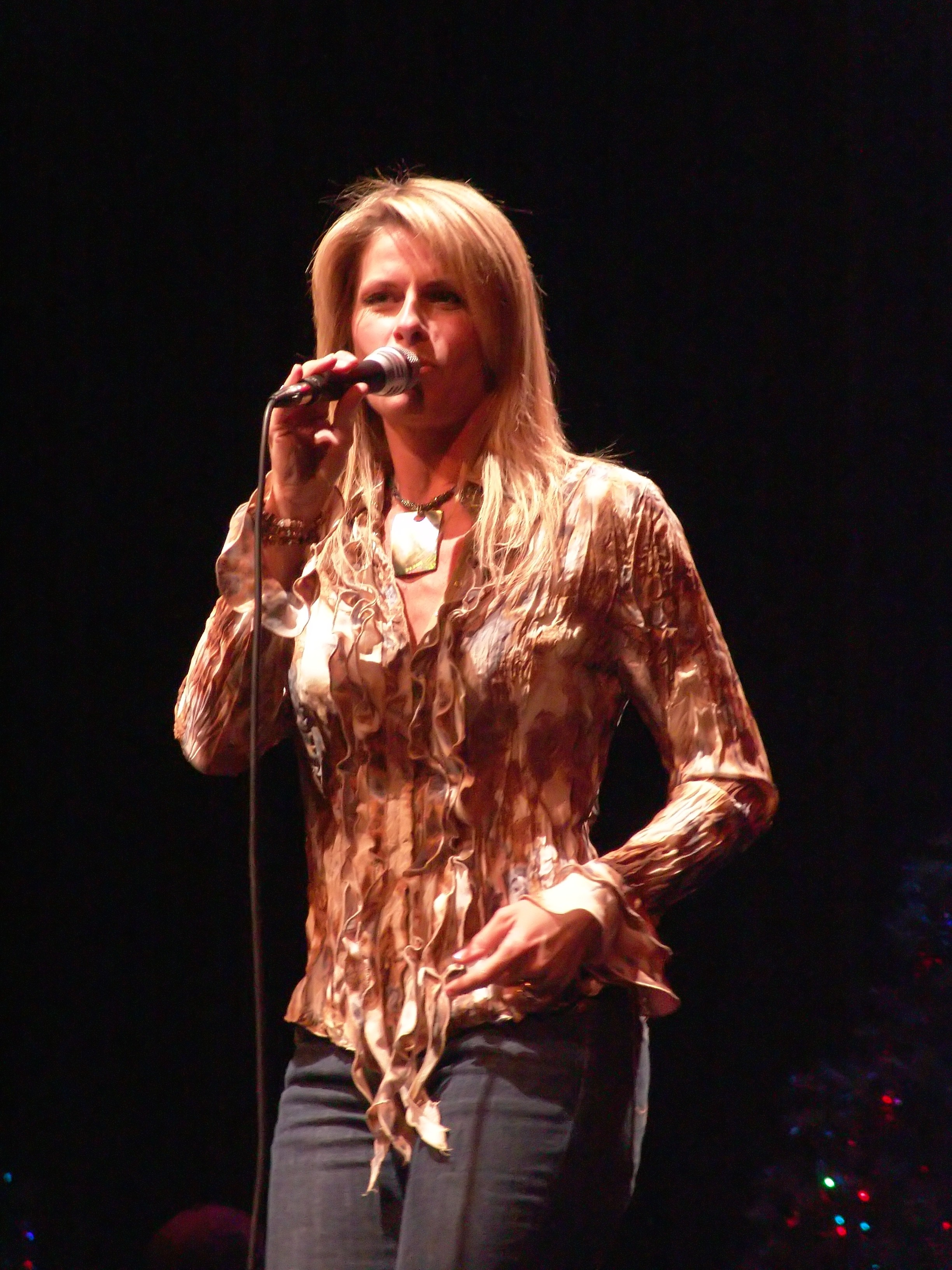
- Diane Chase, November 2005

Background information
- Origin: Sudbury, Ontario, Canada
- Genres: Country
- Occupation: Singer
- Instrument: Vocals
- Years active: 2000–present
- Label: Spin

Diane Chase is a Canadian country music artist. Chase has released three studio albums, 2000's In the Middle of Something, 2004's The Ride and 2009's Gettin' There. Her debut album produced two charting singles on the RPM Country Tracks chart in Canada, of which the highest was the No. 11-peaking title track.

== Discography ==
=== Albums ===
Year	Album
2000	In the Middle of Something
2004	The Ride
2009	Gettin' There

=== Singles ===
Year	Single	CAN Country	Album
1999	"In the Middle of Something"	11	In the Middle of Something
2000	"Walking Away with You"	19	In the Middle of Something
2000	"Taking Back My Heart"	×	In the Middle of Something
2001	"There I Go Again"	×	In the Middle of Something
2002	"Crazy in Love"	×	In the Middle of Something
2002	"How Do I Break Your Heart" (with Jason Barry)	×	In the Middle of Something
2003	"The Ride"	×	The Ride
2004	"I Hate Love"	—	The Ride
2005	"Woman I Wanna Be"	—	The Ride
2006	"Hearts Don't Think Like That"	—	The Ride
2006	"Soiree in the Kitchen"	—	The Ride
2007	"I Wanna Live Like That"	—	Gettin' There
2009	"Rich Girl"	—	Gettin' There
2009	"Gettin' There"	—	Gettin' There
2010	"I Miss Us"	—	Gettin' There
2010	"Stand Still"	—	Gettin' There
"—" denotes releases that did not chart "×" indicates that no relevant chart existed or was archived

=== Music videos ===
Year	Video
1999	"In the Middle of Something"
2000	"Walking Away with You"
2000	"Taking Back My Heart"

== Awards and nominations ==
Year	Association	Category	Result
2001	Canadian Country Music Association	Independent Female Artist of the Year	Nominated
2001	Canadian Country Music Association	Independent Song of the Year – "In the Middle of Something"	Nominated
2001	Canadian Country Music Association	Independent Female Artist of the Year	Nominated
2001	Canadian Country Music Association	Independent Song of the Year – "Taking Back My Heart"	Nominated
2002	Canadian Country Music Association	Independent Female Artist of the Year	Nominated
2003	Canadian Country Music Association	Independent Female Artist of the Year	Nominated
2004	Canadian Country Music Association	Independent Female Artist of the Year	Nominated
2005	Canadian Country Music Association	Independent Female Artist of the Year	Nominated
2006	Canadian Country Music Association	Independent Female Artist of the Year	Nominated
2007	Canadian Country Music Association	Independent Female Artist of the Year	Nominated
