= That'll Teach Her =

Single by Chris Cummings

from the album Lonesomeville
- Released: 2000
- Genre: Country
- Length: 2:33
- Label: WEA
- Songwriters: Chris Cummings; Gary Burr
- Producers: Jim Ed Norman; Rick Scott

Chris Cummings singles chronology
"Wild Wild West" (1999)	"That'll Teach Her" (2000)	"No One Hurts Me More Than Me" (2000)

"That'll Teach Her" is a song recorded by Canadian country music artist Chris Cummings. It was released in 2000 as the first single from his second studio album, Lonesomeville. It peaked at number 4 on the RPM Country Tracks chart in March 2000.

== Chart performance ==
Chart (2000)	Peak position
Canada Country Singles (RPM)	4
