= Shame on Me =

Single by The Wilkinsons

from the album Here and Now
- Released: 2000
- Genre: Country
- Length: 3:45
- Label: Giant
- Songwriters: Gary Burr; Steve Wilkinson
- Producers: Doug Johnson; Russ Zavitson; Tony Haselden

The Wilkinsons singles chronology
"Jimmy's Got a Girlfriend" (2000)	"Shame on Me" (2000)	"1999" (2000)

"Shame on Me" is a song recorded by Canadian country music group The Wilkinsons. It was released in 2000 as the second single from their second studio album, Here and Now. It peaked at number 10 on the RPM Country Tracks chart in August 2000.

== Chart performance ==
Chart (2000)	Peak position
Canada Country Singles (RPM)	10
US Hot Country Songs (Billboard)	49
