= Alecia Elliott =

American singer-songwriter (born 1982)

- Born: December 25, 1982 (age 43); Muscle Shoals, Alabama, U.S.
- Genre: Country
- Instrument: Vocals
- Years active: 1999–2001, 2019–present
- Labels: MCA Nashville, Muscle Shoals Recordings
- Website: aleciaelliott.com

Alecia Elliott (born December 25, 1982) is an American contemporary country music singer and actress. She was discovered by Lorrie Morgan, who was impressed by her demo recordings in the mid-1990s. Elliott issued her first studio recording on MCA Nashville in 2000 entitled I'm Diggin' It. As an actress, Elliott was one of the stars of the TNBC series All About Us, of which she also co-wrote its theme song.

In 2001, the American Music Awards nominated Elliott for the American Music Award for Favorite Country New Artist, losing to Billy Gilman.

In December 2019, she returned to music with a new single called "What Love Can Do" under Muscle Shoals Recordings. It was her first single since 2001. Her second studio album, Voodoo, was released in September 2020. As of September 2021, "Voodoo" had been removed from all streaming platforms but does remain on YouTube.

On April 23, 2023, Alecia released a new R&B single titled "Addicted" independently.

== Discography ==
=== Albums ===
Title	Album details	Peak chart positions		
Title	Album details	US Country	US	US Heat
I'm Diggin' It	Release date: January 25, 2000; Label: MCA Nashville	18	172	6

=== Singles ===
Year	Single	Peak chart positions		Album
Year	Single	US Country	CAN Country	Album
1999	"I'm Diggin' It"	50	61	I'm Diggin' It
2000	"You Wanna What?"	70	—	I'm Diggin' It
2019	"What Love Can Do"	–	–	Non-album singles
"—" denotes releases that did not chart

=== Music videos ===
Year	Video	Director
1999	"I'm Diggin' It"	Morgan Lawley
2000	"You Wanna What?"	Morgan Lawley
2001	"If You Believe"	
