= Jimmy's Got a Girlfriend =

2000 single by The Wilkinsons

Single by The Wilkinsons

from the album Here and Now
- B-side: "Williamstown"
- Released: January 10, 2000
- Genre: Country
- Length: 3:25
- Label: Giant
- Songwriters: Ron Harbin; Richie McDonald; Anthony L. Smith
- Producers: Doug Johnson; Russ Zavitson; Tony Haselden

The Wilkinsons singles chronology
"Nothing but Love (Standing in the Way)" (1999)	"Jimmy's Got a Girlfriend" (2000)	"Shame on Me" (2000)

"Jimmy's Got a Girlfriend" is a song recorded by Canadian country music group The Wilkinsons. It was released in January 2000 as the lead single from their album Here and Now. The song reached number 11 on the Canadian RPM Country Tracks chart and number 34 on the U.S. Billboard Hot Country Singles & Tracks chart. It was written by Ron Harbin, Anthony L. Smith, and Lonestar lead singer Richie McDonald. It was named Single of the Year at the 2000 Canadian Country Music Association Awards and was nominated at the 2001 Grammy Awards for Best Country Performance by a Duo or Group with Vocal.

== Music video ==
The music video was directed by Jim Shea and premiered in early 2000.

== Chart performance ==
Chart (2000)	Peak position
Canada Country Singles (RPM)	11
US Hot Country Songs (Billboard)	34
