= 20 Greatest Hits (Glen Campbell album) =

Compilation album by Glen Campbell
- Released: February 29, 2000
- Genre: Country
- Length: 59:40
- Label: Capitol

20 Greatest Hits contains single and album tracks recorded by Glen Campbell between 1965 and 1993.

== Track listing ==
No.	Title	Writer(s)	Length
1.	"By The Time I Get To Phoenix"	Jimmy Webb	2:43
2.	"Scarborough Fair/Canticle"	Paul Simon, Art Garfunkel	3:20
3.	"Classical Gas"	Mason Williams	3:15
4.	"Southern Nights"	Allen Toussaint	2:59
5.	"Amazing Grace"	John Newton	3:51
6.	"King of the Road"	Roger Miller	2:12
7.	"Wichita Lineman"	Jimmy Webb	3:06
8.	"The Impossible Dream"	Mitch Leigh, Joe Darion	2:44
9.	"Just To Satisfy You"	Bowman, Jennings	2:25
10.	"Somebody Like That"	Bryant, Thurman	3:14
11.	"Rhinestone Cowboy"	Larry Weiss	3:15
12.	"If Not For You"	Bob Dylan	2:46
13.	"He Ain't Heavy, He's My Brother"	Bob Russell, Bobby Scott	3:25
14.	"Galveston"	Jimmy Webb	2:40
15.	"Both Sides Now"	Joni Mitchell	3:44
16.	"Gentle On My Mind"	John Hartford	2:58
17.	"Unconditional Love"	Dubois, Lowery. Sharp	3:18
18.	"Mr. Tambourine Man"	Bob Dylan	2:46
19.	"(Sittin' On) The Dock Of The Bay"	Steve Cropper, Otis Redding	2:34
20.	"I'm So Lonesome I Could Cry"	Hank Williams	2:25

== Production ==
- Compilation produced by Bill Kennedy
- Mastered by Denny Purcell/Georgetown Masters
- Art direction/design – Carlton Davis
- Liner notes – Nancy Sweid-Henderson
- Photo archivist – Kat Johl
- Production assistance – Dennis Jarvis
- Digital imager – Colourworks

== Charts ==
Album – Billboard (United States)

Chart	Entry date	Peak position	No. of weeks
Billboard Country Albums	04/08/2000	71	1
