= Somewhere Inside (Chris Cummings song) =

Single by Chris Cummings

from the album Somewhere Inside
- Released: 1996
- Genre: Country
- Length: 4:01
- Label: Warner Music Canada
- Songwriter: Chris Cummings
- Producers: Jim Ed Norman; Rick Scott

Chris Cummings singles chronology
"Sure Enough" (1996)	"Somewhere Inside" (1996)	"Almost Always" (1997)

"Somewhere Inside" is a song recorded by Canadian country music artist Chris Cummings. It was released in 1996 as the third single from his debut album, Somewhere Inside. It peaked at number 4 on the RPM Country Tracks chart in January 1997.

== Content ==
The narrator comes across a box of items that were left behind from a former lover. While looking at them, the narrator says that although his lover is gone, she's still with him somewhere inside.

== Chart performance ==
Chart (1996–1997)	Peak position
Canada Country Singles (RPM)	4

=== Year-end charts ===
Chart (1997)	Position
Canada Country Tracks (RPM)	72
