= Jennifer Day (singer) =

American country music singer

- Born: Jennifer Day Morrison; August 22, 1979 (age 46)
- Origin: McAlpin, Florida, U.S.
- Genres: Country
- Occupation: Singer
- Instruments: Vocals, piano
- Years active: 1999–2000
- Label: BNA

Jennifer Day Morrison (born August 22, 1979) is an American country music singer. Signed to BNA Records in late 1999, she has released one studio album (2000's The Fun of Your Love) and has charted two singles on the Billboard Hot Country Singles & Tracks (now Hot Country Songs) charts. The album's title track was also featured in the 2000 film For Love of the Game.

== Discography ==
=== Albums ===
Title	Album details	Peak chart positions	
Title	Album details	US Country	US Heat
The Fun of Your Love	Release date: March 7, 2000; Label: BNA Records	36	45

=== Singles ===
Year	Single	Peak chart positions		Album
Year	Single	US Country	CAN Country	Album
1999	"The Fun of Your Love"	31	40	The Fun of Your Love
2000	"What If It's Me?"	67	—	The Fun of Your Love
2000	"Completely"	—	—	The Fun of Your Love
"—" denotes releases that did not chart

=== Music videos ===
Year	Video	Director
1999	"The Fun of Your Love"	Shaun Silva
