= Beverley Mitchell =

American actress

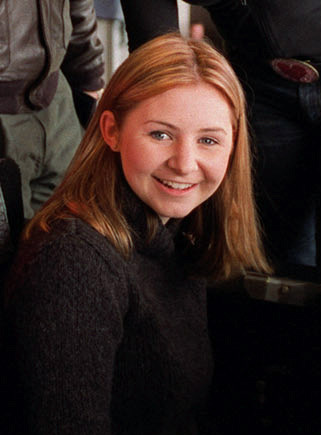
- Mitchell in 2001
- Born: Beverley Ann Mitchell; January 22, 1981 (age 45); Arcadia, California, U.S.
- Education: Loyola Marymount University
- Occupations: Actress, singer
- Years active: 1990–present
- Spouse: Michael Cameron (m. 2008)
- Children: 3

Beverley Ann Mitchell (born January 22, 1981) is an American actress and singer. She began her career with multiple guest roles on television programs, as well as portraying a young Nancy Sinatra in the CBS biographical miniseries Sinatra (1992). Mitchell received mainstream recognition for her main role as Lucy Camden-Kinkirk on the WB and CW drama television series 7th Heaven (1996–2007).

Following her breakout role on 7th Heaven, Mitchell had a supporting role in the superhero film The Crow: City of Angels (1996). In the 2000s, she starred in the Disney Channel television film Right on Track (2003) and the horror film Saw II (2005), and had a supporting role in the sex comedy film Extreme Movie (2008). In the 2010s, Mitchell starred in the comedy film Snowmen (2010) and portrayed a fictionalized version of herself on the Pop series Hollywood Darlings (2017–2018). She also had a recurring role as Kaitlin O'Malley on the ABC Family series The Secret Life of the American Teenager (2011–2013).

Outside of acting, Mitchell released a self-titled country album in 2007, which peaked at number 30 on the Billboard Top Country Albums chart.

== Early life and education ==
Mitchell was born Beverley Ann Mitchell on January 22, 1981, in Arcadia, California to Sharon (née Weisz) and David Mitchell. In 1999, Mitchell graduated from Chaminade College Preparatory School and then began studying film production at Loyola Marymount University.

== Career ==
Mitchell's first major film role was at age 15 in The Crow: City of Angels, playing teenaged drug addict Grace. During the filming of the 1996 movie, she unsuccessfully auditioned for the role of Mary Camden in the new family drama, 7th Heaven. She then read for the part of sister Lucy and was cast.

In 2000, Mitchell had a small part in The Amanda Show as a customer in Moody's Point. In 2003, she played Erica Enders in the Disney Channel original movie Right on Track, based on the early career of the 2014 NHRA Mello Yello Drag Racing Series Pro Stock champion and her sister Courtney Enders, who was played by Brie Larson. During a hiatus from filming 7th Heaven in 2005, Mitchell played Laura Hunter in the horror sequel Saw II. In 2006, she recorded her debut, self-titled country album. She co-wrote eight of the songs featured on the album, including "Angel", which is about her friend who was killed in a car accident when the two were teenagers. Mitchell starred in the 2007 TV movie I Know What I Saw, which aired on the Lifetime network.

In 2010, Mitchell took on the role of school counselor Katelyn O'Malley on the third season of The Secret Life of the American Teenager. In March 2016, she was cast in the Pop Hollywood Darlings with fellow 1990s' child stars Jodie Sweetin and Christine Lakin. The series premiered April 12, 2017.

In April 2024, it was announced that Mitchell would co-host along with her former co-stars, Mackenzie Rosman and David Gallagher, a 7th Heaven rewatch podcast, Catching up with the Camdens.

In 2026, Mitchell competed in the HGTV series Totally 90s House while being partnered with fellow actors, Brian Austin Green and Jodie Sweetin.

== Personal life ==
Mitchell married her long-time boyfriend Michael Cameron on October 1, 2008, in Ravello, Italy on the Amalfi Coast. Former 7th Heaven castmates Jessica Biel and Mackenzie Rosman served as bridesmaids. They have a son and two daughters.

== Filmography ==
=== Television ===
Year	Title	Role	Notes
1990	Big Brother Jake	Cassie	
1990	Children of the Bride	Jersey	TV movie
1990	Baby of the Bride	Jersey	TV movie
1992	Quantum Leap	Becky Pruitt	Episode: "Killin' Time"
1992	Sinatra	Little Nancy at 7–9	Miniseries
1993	Mother of the Bride	Jersey	TV movie
1993	Phenom	Clare	Episodes: "There's No Place Like Home"; Episode: "A Lou-Daughter Picnic"
1994	Melrose Place	Katie Conners	Episode: "No Strings Attached"
1995	White Dwarf	XuXu	TV movie
1995	Baywatch	Melissa	Episode: "Hot Stuff"
1996	The Faculty	Leslie	Episode: "Behavior Among Adults"
1996–2007	7th Heaven	Lucy Camden-Kinkirk	Main role
2000	Hey Arnold!	Summer (voice)	Episode: "Summer Love"
2000	Girl Band	Suzanne	TV movie
2003	Right on Track	Erica Enders	TV movie
2008	Post Mortem	Mackenzie Greer	TV movie
2011–2013	The Secret Life of the American Teenager	Kaitlin O'Malley	Main role
2012	The Haunting Of	Self	Episode: "'The Haunting Of' Beverley Mitchell"
2013	Get Out Alive	Lucy Forester	TV movie
2015	A Gift Wrapped Christmas	Stephanie	TV movie
2017	Taken Too Far	Beth Hoyson	TV movie
2017–2018	Hollywood Darlings	Herself	Main role
2018	Rock N' Roll Christmas	Ashlyn Rose	TV movie
2018	Hometown Christmas	Noel Russell	TV movie
2020	Candy Cane Christmas	Phoebe Saunders	TV movie
2023	Special Forces: World's Toughest Test	Self - contestant	Reality show, Season 1
2026	Worst Cooks in America	Self - contestant	Reality show, Season 30 - Runner-up
2026	Totally 90s House	Self - contestant	Reality show

=== Film ===
Year	Title	Role	Notes
1994	Killing Obsession	Annie	
1996	The Crow: City of Angels	Grace	
2001	Mean People Suck	Kate's Sister	Short
2005	Saw II	Laura Hunter	
2008	Extreme Movie	Sue	
2010	Snowmen	Mrs. Sherbrook	
2012	Pennhurst	Sarah	
2014	The Dog Who Saved Easter	Alice	
2015	Toxin	Isabelle	
2015	Broken: A Musical	Dr. Allicia Walker	
2018	Dance Baby Dance	Tess	
2021	Uploaded	Victoria Perry	
2021	Blood Pageant	Shelley	
2026	Love in Storytown	Mandy Taylor	

== Discography ==
Title	Album details	Peak chart positions	
Title	Album details	US Country	US Heat
Beverley Mitchell	Release date: January 23, 2007; Label: Daywind Records	30	8

== Awards and nominations ==
Young Artist Awards

- 1997: Best Performance in a Drama Series – Young Actress (7th Heaven) – Won
- 1998: Best Performance in a TV Drama Series – Leading Young Actress (7th Heaven) – Won
- 1999: Best Performance in a TV Series – Young Ensemble (7th Heaven) – Nominated (with Barry Watson, David Gallagher, Jessica Biel and Mackenzie Rosman)
- 2000: Best Performance in a TV Drama Series – Leading Young Actress (7th Heaven) – Won

Teen Choice Awards

- 2005: Choice TV Actress: Drama (7th Heaven) – Nominated

YoungStar Awards

- 1998: Best Performance by a Young Actress in a Drama TV Series (7th Heaven) – Nominated
- 2000: Best Young Ensemble Cast – Television (7th Heaven) – Nominated (with David Gallagher, Jessica Biel and Mackenzie Rosman)
