= No One Hurts Me More Than Me =

2000 song performed by Chris Cummings

Single by Chris Cummings

from the album Lonesomeville
- Released: 2000
- Genre: Country
- Length: 2:20
- Label: WEA
- Songwriters: Chris Cummings; Rod Lewis
- Producers: Jim Ed Norman; Rick Scott

Chris Cummings singles chronology
| "That'll Teach Her" (2000) | "No One Hurts Me More Than Me" (2000) | "A Little at a Time" (2000) |

"No One Hurts Me More Than Me" is a song recorded by Canadian country music artist Chris Cummings. It was released in 2000 as the second single from his second studio album, Lonesomeville. It peaked at number 7 on the RPM Country Tracks chart in August 2000.

== Chart performance ==
| Chart (2000) | Peak position |
|---|---|
| Canada Country Singles (RPM) | 7 |
