= Junior Dragster =

Drag racing car

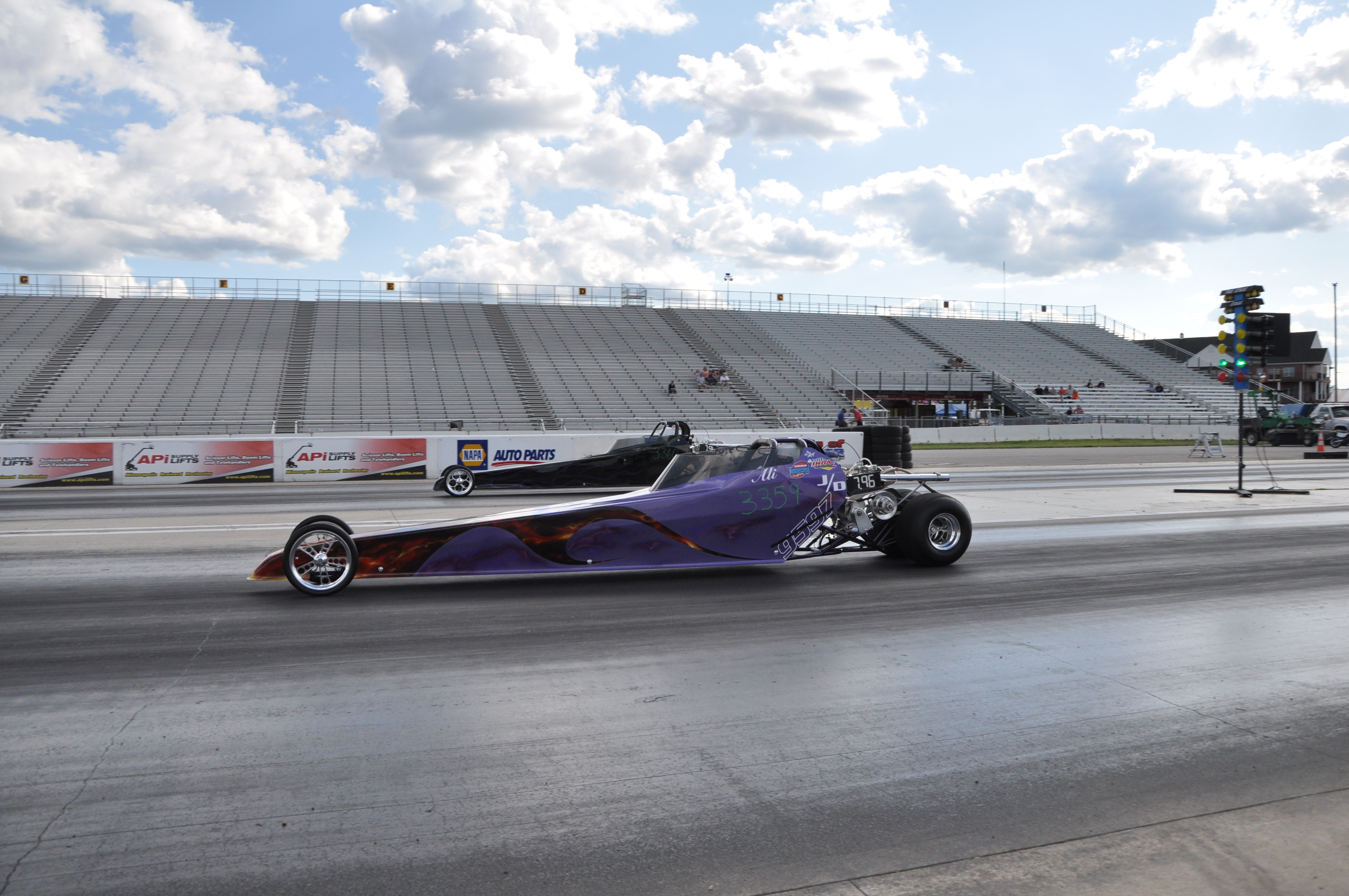
Junior Dragsters

The Junior Dragster or Jr Dragster is a scaled-down version of the top fuel dragster or a roadster (where it is called Junior Roadster but is classified by the same rules as the NHRA). The cars were developed in New Zealand in 1988, with classes developed by the New Zealand Hot Rod Association. The National Hot Rod Association in the USA began sanctioning the class in 1991, with the JDRL (Junior Drag Racing League). The JDRL is a division of the NHRA, which consists of three different vehicle categories: two are based on the traditional Jr. Dragster categories two different dragster classes, traditional Jr. Dragster having a wheelbase between 90 and 150 inches, or Jr. Roadster, which features a Chevrolet Corvette or Toyota Supra body on the Jr. Dragster chassis, and a single-cylinder, five brake horsepower Briggs & Stratton engine, and the larger Jr. Comp dragster being 150-190 inches in wheelbase and using a motorcycle or personal watercraft engine. Junior drag racers may choose to participate in programs run by the NHRA, IHRA and the Australian National Drag Racing Association [ANDRA], or at an unsanctioned facility. Drivers may be male or female and must be at least five years of age to test, and six years to compete, and be no older than 20 years on December 31 of the competition year (a driver who turns 18 on January 2 is permitted to race in the class until December 31 of the year in question). According to the 2025 NHRA rule book, parents are allowed to participate in Jr. Dragster with their children with a "Master" division for parents to assist their child by participating in their own class and either test or race them. The idea is to allow families to race together with one car in different categories (parents and children share one car) or for parents to assist their children in shaking down a car and assisting with car setup. Some tracks have events where parents drive their child's car in an additional event during the meeting.

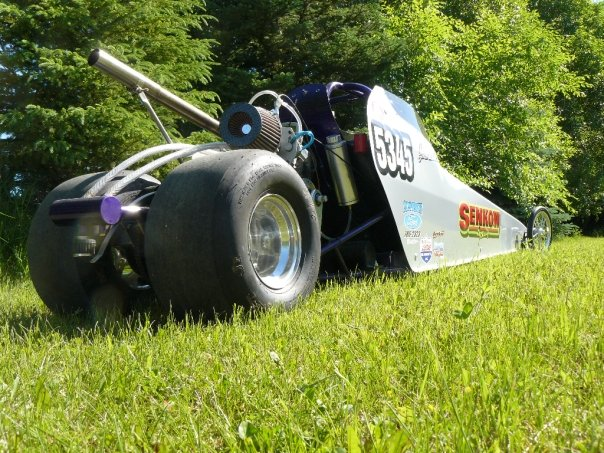
Back View of a Jr Dragster

Tracks are 1/16 mile (330 feet) or 1/8 mile (660 feet), and depending on class, is contested as a bracket race or a heads-up start on a 5-tenths sportsman tree. Racers' E.T (elapsed time) is determined by age. Drivers age 5 can only test in single-car passes, and can go no faster than 20.00 seconds (19.90 in the IHRA). Drivers age 6-7 can go no faster than 13.90 (and must start heads-up), and can officially compete in full competition. Drivers age 5-7 must use a crate engine from Briggs & Stratton with a slide valve to reduce power. Drivers age 8-9 can go no faster than 11.90, 10- to 12-year-olds are limited to 8.90, and drivers 13 and older (categorised as 13-17 and in the NHRA, Master categories for 18 and over) can go up to 7.90 at 85 MPH. However, no driver over 18 can compete against a driver 17 and under. Drivers 14-20 can race in Jr. Comp, where racers are limited to 6.900 at 109.99 MPH. Drivers who are 9 as of January 1 can participate in either the 8-9 or 10-12 category once they turn 10 during the year, and drivers who are 12 as of January 1 can participate in the 10-12 or 13-17 category once they turn 13 during the year. Drivers who turn 14 may run in Jr. Comp. A driver who turns 18 during the year may stay in Jr. Dragster as a Master before jumping to either the adult classes or Jr. Comp. A Jr. Comp car can be used in a standard Competition Eliminator class at the local track.

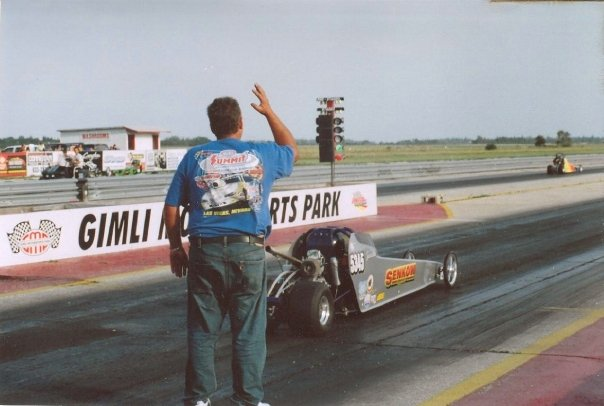
The gap between a slower car and a faster car in a bracket race at Gimli Motorsports Park.

Jr. Dragsters also compete in a different racing class called 'Outlaw'. This class is run to the 330 ft. cone of the racing surface. The class runs heads-up on a 4-tenths pro tree. Usually this class is a qualified field, so the teams have to give it all they can just to make the field. While different series rules vary, the main principle is the same. The different series restrict engine combinations and weight packages so that the cars do not exceed the 4.10 time NHRA says is the fastest junior dragsters can run to the 330 ft. legally.

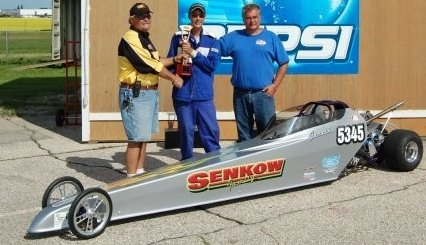
Winning the same trophy as the Pros.

Racers compete almost every weekend, running in points series at their home tracks, or in various specialty events with big prizes. During the course of the year, racers could also attend various division events, or Nationals. In the NHRA, racers choose between attending the Eastern and the Western Conference Finals. In the UK there are over thirty racers and still growing. Though bracket racing is still the main factor of Jr. Drag racing, varieties of heads up racing are also a growing part of this sport. The next step up for Jr. Dragster is Jr. Comp, and then moving into full size car categories, with either Competition Eliminator or Super Street (10.90 or 6.90 in the 1/8 mile) being recommended, although some may start in Super Gas (9.90 or 6.30 in the 1/8 mile).
