= The Fun of Your Love =

Studio album by Jennifer Day
- Released: March 7, 2000
- Studio: Sound Emporium (Nashville, Tennessee); Javelina (Nashville, Tennessee); Garden Recording
- Genre: Country
- Length: 41:45
- Label: BNA
- Producer: Robert Byrne

Singles from The Fun of Your Love
- 1. "The Fun of Your Love" Released: 1999; 2. "What If It's Me?" Released: 2000; 3. "Completely" Released: 2000

The Fun of Your Love is the debut studio album by American country music singer Jennifer Day. It was released by BNA Records in 2000.

== Content ==
The Fun of Your Love charted two singles on the Billboard Hot Country Songs charts in 2000: the title track at number 31, and "What If It's Me" at number 67.

== Critical reception ==
Rating it four out of five stars, Maria Konicki Dinoia of AllMusic praised the selection of songwriters such as Beth Nielsen Chapman, and compared Day's voice favorably to Martina McBride. Jeffrey B. Remz of Country Standard Time was less favorable, considering Day's musical image imitative of other artists and also writing, " the music contains lots of loud guitars and drums to power the glossy sounding songs...and very little of a country sound."

== Track listing ==
No.	Title	Writer(s)	Length
1.	"The Fun of Your Love"	Annie Roboff, Beth Nielsen Chapman, Jennifer Day	3:57
2.	"Yeah Right"	Phil Vassar, Julie Wood, Robert Byrne	3:29
3.	"Tell Me I'm the One"	Day, Tommy Lee James	3:40
4.	"Someday"	Wood, Carolyn Dawn Johnson	3:28
5.	"Somebody Else's Guy"	James, Jamie O'Neal, Jennifer Kimball	3:40
6.	"What If It's Me?"	Angela Kaset, Byrne	4:23
7.	"Gone by Dawn"	Byrne, Vassar, Wood	3:23
8.	"I Turn to You"	Diane Warren	4:21
9.	"Disappear"	Chris Lindsey, Aimee Mayo	4:13
10.	"Fearless"	Day, Blair Daly, Kent Blazy	3:40
11.	"Completely"	Day, James, Liz Hengber	3:31
Total length:			41:45

- Track information and credits verified from the album's liner notes.

== Charts ==
Chart (2000)	Peak position
Top Country Albums (Billboard)	36
Heatseekers Albums (Billboard)	45

=== Singles ===
Year	Single	Peak chart positions	
Year	Single	US Country	CAN Country
1999	"The Fun of Your Love"	31	40
2000	"What If It's Me?"	67	—
2000	"Completely"	—	—

== Musicians ==
- Jennifer Day: lead vocals
- Shannon Forrest: drums
- Jimmy Carter: bass
- Brent Mason, Kelly Back, Steve Mandile: electric guitar
- Biff Watson, Robert Byrne, B. James Lowry: acoustic guitar
- Paul Franklin: lap steel guitar, steel guitar, sitar
- Scotty Sanders: steel guitar
- B James Lowry: gut string guitar
- Aubrey Haynie: mandolin, fiddle
- Stave Nathan: synthesizer, B-3 organ, keyboards, piano
- Robert Byrne, Shannon Forrest: tambourine
- D. Bergen White: arranger/conductor
- Carl Gorodetsky: Contractor
- Tom McAninch: Copyist
- Carl Gorodetsky, Cate Myer, Alan Umstead, Lee Harrison, David B. Angell, David H. Davidson, Catherine Umstead, Conni Ellisor, Mary K. Vanosdale, Karen E. Winklemann: violins
- Monisa P. Angell, Richard J. Grosjean, Kristen Wilkerson, Gary Vanosdale: viola
- Anthony La Marchina, Bob Mason: cello
- Dillon Dixon, Beth Nielson Chapman, Wes Hightower, Marty Slayton, Carolyn Dawn Johnson, Julie Wood, Kennifer Kimball, Tommy Lee James, Jennifer Day, Annie Roboff: background vocals

== Production ==
- Robert Byrne: Producer
- Steve Lowery: Recorder, mixer
- Robert Byrne, Shawn Simpson, Patrick Murphy, Steve Crowder, Dave Matthews, Fred Paragano: additional recording
- John Skinner: tracking engineering assistance
- Hank Williams: master
