= Highway (The Wilkinsons album) =

Studio album by The Wilkinsons
- Released: March 29, 2005
- Genre: Country
- Length: 50:49
- Label: Open Road
- Producer: Tony Haselden; Steve Wilkinson; Russ Zavitson

The Wilkinsons chronology
Here and Now (2000)	Highway (2005)	Home (2007)

Professional ratings
Review scores
Source	Rating
Allmusic	link

Highway is the fourth studio album by the Canadian country music group The Wilkinsons. It was released on March 29, 2005.

== Track listing ==
1. "Little Girl" (Rob Crosby, Amanda Wilkinson, Steve Wilkinson) - 4:08
2. "Melancholy Wine" (Charlie Craig, A. Wilkinson, S. Wilkinson) - 3:58
3. "Leaving Song" (Crosby, Ray Stephenson, S. Wilkinson) - 3:43
4. "Inside the Lines" (Brad Crisler, A. Wilkinson, S. Wilkinson) - 3:05
5. "L.A." (Michael Dulaney, Natalie Hemby) - 3:19
6. "One Blue Day" (Crosby, S. Wilkinson) - 4:08
7. "No One's Gonna" (Craig, S. Wilkinson) - 3:25
8. "Human" (Bruce Gatch, A. Wilkinson, Tyler Wilkinson) - 2:47
9. "Highway" (Crosby, Stephenson, S. Wilkinson) - 4:07
10. "Not Today" (Gary Burr, S. Wilkinson) - 4:12
11. "Occasionally Crazy" (Crosby, A. Wilkinson, S. Wilkinson) - 3:07
12. "You Want Me" (Tony Haselden) - 3:27
13. "Williamstown" (John Scott Sherrill, S. Wilkinson) - 3:45
14. "Grains of Sand" (Craig, Crosby, S. Wilkinson) - 3:38

== Personnel ==
The Wilkinsons

- Amanda Wilkinson – vocals
- Steve Wilkinson – harmonica, vocals
- Tyler Wilkinson – vocals

Additional Musicians

- Joe Chemay – bass guitar
- Dan Dugmore – dobro, lap steel guitar, pedal steel guitar
- Shannon Forrest – drums, percussion
- Jerry Kimbrough – acoustic guitar
- Mike Rojas – keyboards
- Joe Spivey – fiddle
- John Willis – banjo, acoustic guitar, electric guitar, mandolin, sitar
