= Amanda Stott =

- Also known as: Amanda Young
- Born: May 6, 1982 (age 44); Brandon, Manitoba, Canada
- Genres: CCM, pop, country, country pop
- Occupation: Singer-songwriter
- Years active: 2000–2012; 2023–present
- Labels: His Grip, EMI Canada, Warner Canada
- Spouse: Matt Young (m. 2010)

Amanda Stott (born May 6, 1982) is a Canadian singer and songwriter from Brandon, Manitoba, Canada.

== Early life and career ==
Stott was born on May 6, 1982, in Brandon, Manitoba, Canada to Cyril and Tiena Stott. She grew up on her family farm in rural Manitoba, Canada. She has an older brother named Conrad. Her father was a saxophonist and pianist. She started singing in the church choir at Brandon Calvary Temple when she was just three years old. She first gained prominence as a country singer at the Dauphin Country Fest in 1994. In 1999, she signed with Warner Music Canada and her first self-titled album was released in 2000. This album prompted the single "Black Is Black" which quickly became a hit on country radio and television. She was also nominated for a Juno Award for Best New Solo Artist.

After a few years away from the spotlight, Stott returned with a more adult pop sound and her first single, "Paper Rain", reached No. 1 on the Canadian Singles Chart. On March 8, 2005, her second album, Chasing the Sky, was released. It included "Paper Rain" and follow up singles "Homeless Heart" and "She'll Get Over It".

On April 13, 2005, Stott performed live at the Yukon Arts Centre in Whitehorse, Yukon.

Stott performed on July 1, 2005 as part of the Canada Day celebrations, taking place on Parliament Hill in Ottawa. In the summer of 2005 she toured Canada with fellow female Canadian singers Keshia Chanté, Christine Evans and Cassie Steele. In December 2005 she was a part of the Holiday Train cross-Canada tour along with Wayne Rostad and the Moffatts.

She was a featured singer in the travelling Cirque du Soleil arena show called Delirium, touring North America from 2006 to 2008.

On September 27, 2011, Stott released the album "Place to Start Again".

On November 22, 2011, Stott released the Christmas single entitled, "O What A Man".

In 2012, she released a single called "Now's Our Time" which features her husband, Matt Young.

After nine years of hiatus on music, On January 9, 2023, Stott announced she and her husband Matt will be traveling to Israel for co-hosting the Back to the Bible Canada organization in Abbotsford, British Columbia, Canada for their event known as "The Israel Experience 2023".

== Personal life ==
Stott met musician Matt Young in October 2008 while Stott was working at Starbucks. Stott and Young married in October 2010. They lived in Nashville, Tennessee with their two sons, who were born in 2013 and 2015.

They moved to Mount Horeb, Wisconsin in March 2020.

In August 2018, Stott began teaching piano and voice lessons independently.

== Discography ==
=== Albums ===
Title	Details	Peak positions
Title	Details	CAN Country
Amanda Stott	Release date: January 4, 2000; Label: Warner Music Canada	18
Chasing the Sky	Release date: March 8, 2005; Label: EMI Music Canada	—
Place to Start Again	Release date: September 27, 2011; Label: His Grip Music	—
"—" denotes releases that did not chart

=== Singles ===
Year	Single	Peak chart positions			Album
Year	Single	CAN	CAN AC	CAN Country	Album
2000	"Black Is Black"	—	—	4	Amanda Stott
2000	"Somebody to Love"	—	—	12	Amanda Stott
2000	"You're Not Alone"	—	×	×	Amanda Stott
2001	"I Just Believe That I Can"	—	×	×	Amanda Stott
2001	"To Keep from Missing You"	—	×	×	Amanda Stott
2004	"Paper Rain"	1	—	—	Chasing the Sky
2005	"Homeless Heart"	—	8	—	Chasing the Sky
2005	"She'll Get Over It"	—	—	—	Chasing the Sky
2005	"Light a Candle"	—	28	—	Non-album singles
2011	"O What A Man"	—	—	—	Non-album singles
2012	"Now's Our Time" (with Matt Young)	—	—	—	Non-album singles
"—" denotes releases that did not chart "×" indicates that no relevant chart existed or was archived

=== Music videos ===
Year	Video	Director
2000	"Black Is Black"	
2000	"Somebody to Love"	
2001	"To Keep from Missing You"	
2005	"Homeless Heart"	Margaret Malandruccolo

== Awards and nominations ==
Year	Association	Category	Result
2000	Canadian Country Music Association	FACTOR Rising Star Award	Nominated
2001	Juno Awards of 2001	Best New Solo Artist	Nominated
2001	Canadian Country Music Association	Chevy Trucks Rising Star Award	Nominated

== See also ==
- List of Canadian musicians
