= Amanda Stott (album) =

Studio album by Amanda Stott
- Released: January 4, 2000
- Recorded: 1999
- Studio: Bathouse Recording Studio
- Genre: Country
- Length: 40:00
- Label: Warner Music Canada
- Producer: Tom McKillip

Amanda Stott chronology
Amanda Stott (2000)	Chasing the Sky (2005)

Amanda Stott is the debut studio album by Canadian country music artist Amanda Stott. It was released by Warner Music Canada on January 4, 2000. The album peaked at number 18 on the RPM Country Albums chart.

== Track listing ==
1. "Somebody to Love" (Randy Goodrum, Rick Price) – 3:26
2. "To Keep from Missing You" (Lisa Brokop, Sam Hogin, Bob Regan) – 2:20
3. "You're Not Alone" (Ron Irving, Dave Pickell) – 4:20
4. "Every Time the Phone Rings" (Rick Bowles, Josh Leo) – 2:58
5. "Black Is Black" (Nikki Hassman, Scott Miller, Even Stevens) – 3:23
6. "All Along" (Goodrum, Steve Wilkinson) – 4:17
7. "Magic" (Denny Carr, Jason McCoy) – 2:48
8. "Nothin' but Love" (Steven Dale Jones, Steve Mandile) – 3:28
9. "Reachin' for a Star" (Ted Hewitt, Troy Seals, Ed Setser) – 3:03
10. "You Can Always Reach Me" (Stephanie Bentley, Tom Shapiro, George Teren) – 3:37
11. "He Loves Me Like That" (Brokop, Ed Hill, Hogin) – 2:41
12. "I Just Believe That I Can" (Irving, Lynda McKillip, Tom McKillip) – 3:39

== Chart performance ==
Chart (2000)	Peak position
Canadian RPM Country Albums	18
