= Here and Now (The Wilkinsons album) =

Studio album by The Wilkinsons
- Released: April 4, 2000
- Genre: Country
- Length: 36:38
- Label: Giant
- Producer: Tony Haselden; Doug Johnson; Russ Zavitson

The Wilkinsons chronology
Nothing but Love (1998)	Here and Now (2000)	Highway (2005)

Here and Now is the second studio album by Canadian country music group The Wilkinsons, released on April 4, 2000. The album includes three singles, all three of which charted in Canada.

== Content ==
In Canada, the singles "Jimmy's Got a Girlfriend", "Shame on Me", and "1999" respectively peaked at numbers 11, 10, and 16 on the RPM country singles charts. In the United States, the former two singles respectively reached numbers 34 and 49 on Hot Country Songs, while "1999" did not chart.

== Critical reception ==
Professional ratings
Review scores
Source	Rating
Allmusic	3.5/5 stars
Country Standard Time	negative

Maria Konicki Dinoia of Allmusic rated the album 3.5 out of 5 stars, saying that "Amanda's vocals, Tyler's harmonies, and Steve's writing all contribute to one of the finest sophomore outings by a country group in a long time." Robert Loy of Country Standard Time was less favorable, criticizing the album for being "skewed toward the young country-pop crowd" and having songs that "have very little to say to anyone whose acne has already cleared up".

== Track listing ==
No.	Title	Writer(s)	Length
1.	"Jimmy's Got a Girlfriend"	Ron Harbin, Richie McDonald, Anthony L. Smith	3:25
2.	"It Was Only a Kiss"	Robin Wiley, Amanda Wilkinson, Tyler Wilkinson	3:54
3.	"One of Us Is in Love"	Tony Haselden, J. Fred Knobloch	3:15
4.	"Till You Let Go"	Charlie Black, Rory Bourke, Steve Wilkinson	3:01
5.	"Shame on Me"	Gary Burr, S. Wilkinson	3:45
6.	"Hypothetically"	Burr, Andrew Gold	2:32
7.	"1999"	John Heaton, Corky Laing, William Wallace, S. Wilkinson	3:28
8.	"Don't Look at Me Like That"	Charlie Craig, Rob Crosby	3:05
9.	"I'll Know Love"	Craig Bickhardt, S. Wilkinson	2:57
10.	"Me, Myself and I"	Craig, Crosby, S. Wilkinson	3:06
11.	"The Only Rose"	Steve Wariner, S. Wilkinson	4:10

== Personnel ==
The Wilkinsons

- Amanda Wilkinson - vocals
- Steve Wilkinson - vocals
- Tyler Wilkinson - vocals

Additional Musicians

- David Angell - violin
- John Catchings - cello
- Joe Chemay - bass guitar
- Eric Darken - percussion
- David Davidson - violin
- Shannon Forrest - drums
- Paul Franklin - steel guitar, pedabro
- Sonny Garrish - steel guitar, Dobro
- Steve Gibson - acoustic guitar, electric guitar, mandolin
- John Hobbs - synthesizer guitar, piano, string arrangements, conductor
- Brent Rowan - electric guitar, gut string guitar
- Steve Wariner - background vocals on "The Only Rose"
- Biff Watson - bouzouki, acoustic guitar
- Kris Wilkinson - viola, string arrangements

== Chart performance ==
Chart (2000)	Peak position
Canadian RPM Country Albums	5
U.S. Billboard Top Country Albums	13
U.S. Billboard 200	114
U.S. Billboard Top Heatseekers	2
