= The Wilkinsons =

Canadian country music trio from Belleville, Ontario

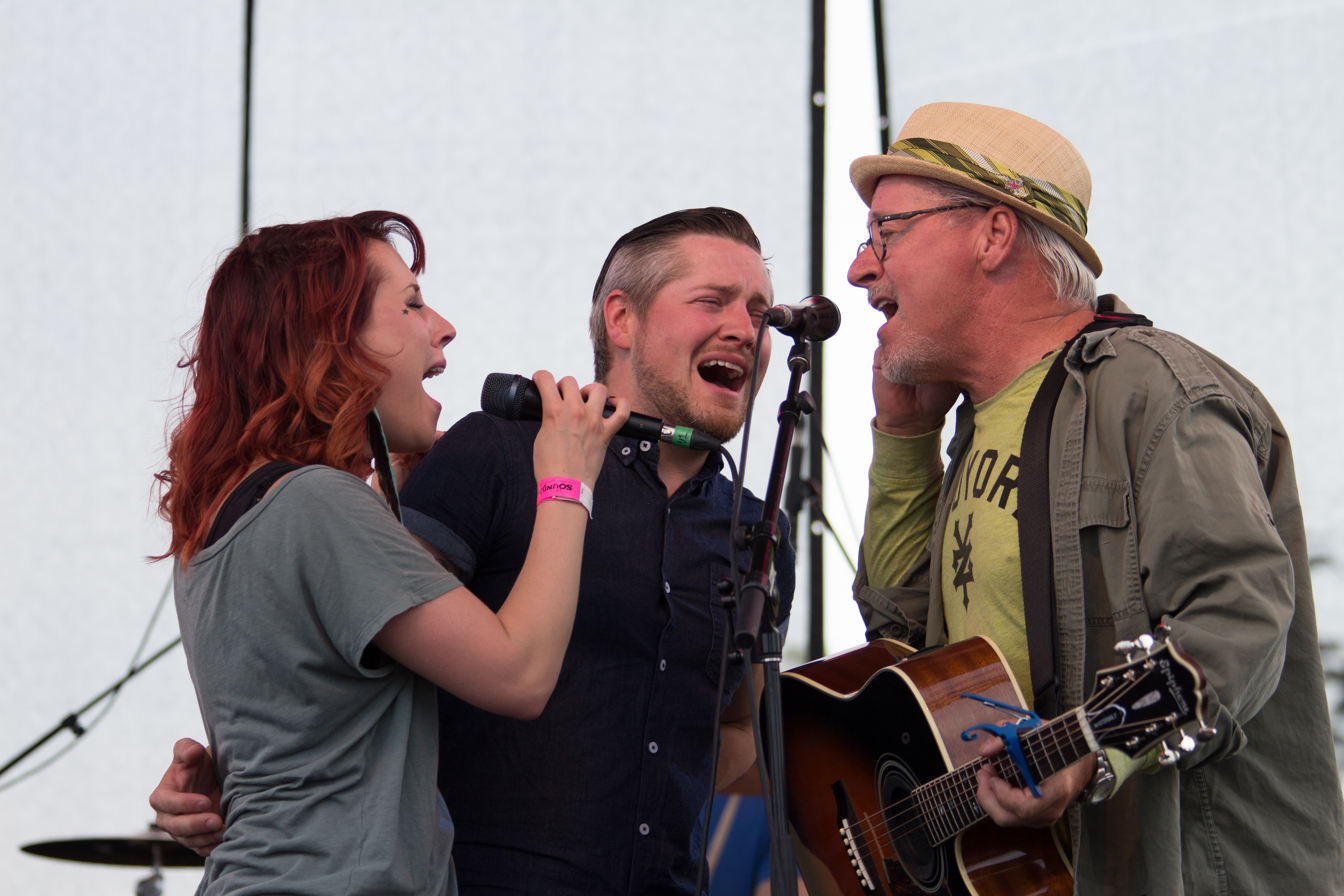
- The Wilkinsons in 2013. Left to right: Amanda, Tyler and Steve Wilkinson.

Background information
- Origin: Trenton, Ontario, Canada
- Genre: Country
- Years active: 1997–2009
- Labels: Giant; Warner Bros. Nashville; BNA; Open Road; Fontana North; Angeline
- Spinoffs: Motion Picture Ending; Small Town Pistols
- Past members: Amanda Wilkinson; Steve Wilkinson; Tyler Wilkinson
- Website: www.wilkinsonsonline.net

The Wilkinsons were a Canadian country music trio from Belleville, Ontario. Founded in 1997, the group consisted of lead singer Amanda Wilkinson, her brother Tyler Wilkinson, and their father, Steve Wilkinson. The Wilkinsons achieved success late in 1998 with the hit single "26 Cents", a Number One on the Canadian country music charts and Top 5 hit on the U.S. Billboard Hot Country Singles & Tracks (now Hot Country Songs) charts. It was followed by "Fly (The Angel Song)", also a No. 1 in Canada. A second album, Here and Now, produced the group's last American top 40 hit in "Jimmy's Got a Girlfriend". Afterward, the trio recorded three more albums, one of which was not released in the United States, but was release in Europe, which included the would-be single, "I Wanna Be That Girl", as well as a Greatest Hits package.

As of 2023, Amanda and Tyler Wilkinson will still perform together occasionally as "The Wilkinsons" without their father, who has retired. The band were inducted into the Canadian Country Music Hall of Fame in 2026.

== History ==
=== Beginnings ===
Steve Wilkinson was born on August 18, 1955, in Belleville, Ontario, Canada. Before the country trio was formed, he was struggling financially after he lost his job at a nuclear power plant due to downsizing. He took menial jobs in order to provide for his family, but his real passion was music. They signed to Giant Records in 1998.

=== Breakthrough ===
The Wilkinsons' first album, Nothing But Love, reached No. 16 on the Billboard Top Country Albums charts in 1998. The trio was nominated for the Country Music Association's Horizon Award and Vocal Group of the Year and for Single of the Year by the Academy of Country Music Awards. Their second album, Here and Now, won the Canadian Country Music Association award for Best Album. The band has received nine Canadian Country Music Awards, one Juno Award and two Grammy nominations (both for Best Country Performance by a Duo or Group).

=== Move to BNA Records ===
In 2001, Giant closed its Nashville division while "I Wanna Be That Girl" was climbing, leading to the band's third Giant album (Shine) being shelved. Shortly thereafter, the trio was signed to BNA Records. Weeks before the release of their first single for BNA, the label's president wanted Amanda to record a solo album, which would ultimately disband the trio. The trio eventually left the label and signed with the independent Canadian label Open Road Records for their 2005 album, Highway.

The group's last studio album, Home, was released on March 20, 2007.

=== Solo work ===
Amanda Wilkinson signed with Universal South Records and released her solo debut album, Amanda Wilkinson. Amanda received four nominations at the 2006 Canadian Country Music Awards (Single of the Year, CMT Video of the Year, Female Artist of the Year, and Album of the Year).

Tyler started the alternative rock band Motion Picture Ending. The band was composed of drummer and long-time friend Justin Devries, bassist Curtis Weekes, guitarist Greg Bolton, with Tyler as lead vocalist and guitarist.

=== Greatest Hits… and Then Some ===
In 2007, The Wilkinsons won Independent Group of the Year at the Canadian Country Music Awards.

Greatest Hits… and Then Some, a greatest hits album, was released on October 7, 2008. The first single, "When I'm Old", was released in mid 2008.

=== Small Town Pistols ===
In the late 2000s, the Wilkinsons disbanded. Amanda and Tyler founded a new duo called Small Town Pistols in 2012.

== Reality television ==
The Wilkinsons
- Created by: Ian Ross MacDonald; Jennifer Kennedy
- Starring: Steve Wilkinson; Amanda Wilkinson; Tyler Wilkinson; Chris Wilkinson; Kiaya Wilkinson; Lauren Ash; Jordan McCloskey; Alison Deon; Chris Drumm; Phyllis Ellis; Lee Hoverd; Scott Watkins
- Country of origin: Canada
- No. of episodes: 20

Production
- Running time: 30 min

Original release
- Network: CMT
- Release: January 4, 2006 – April 4, 2007

The Wilkinsons is a Canadian television series that debuted on CMT on January 4, 2006. The show follows the family as they move back to The Quinte Area, Ontario from Nashville, Tennessee. Cast members include The Wilkinsons, their family, Lauren Ash, Alison Deon, Phyllis Ellis, Scott Watkins, Jordan McCloskey and Lee Hoverd, along with cameo appearances by (Chris Drumm) and the director (Ian Ross MacDonald) and his co-writer (Jennifer Kennedy).

=== Episodes ===
==== Season One (2006) ====
1. Nashville (January 4, 2006)
2. The Decision (January 4, 2006)
3. Friends & Neighbours (January 11, 2006)
4. The Visitors (January 18, 2006)
5. Ulterior Designs (January 25, 2006)
6. It's About Time (February 1, 2006)
7. Winners and Losers (February 8, 2006)
8. The Lockout (February 15, 2006)
9. The Hospital (February 22, 2006)
10. The Big One (February 22, 2006)

==== Season Two (2007) ====
1. The Charity Picnic (March 7, 2007)
2. Baby Bump (March 7, 2007)
3. Gangsta Jamboree (March 14, 2007)
4. The Road To Havelock (March 14, 2007)
5. Groundhog In... (March 21, 2007)
6. Ad Man Cometh (March 21, 2007)
7. Rusty's List (March 28, 2007)
8. Granddaddy Steve (March 28, 2007)
9. Don't Want To Lose... (April 4, 2007)
10. No Place Like Home (April 4, 2007)

== Discography ==
- Nothing but Love (1998)
- Here and Now (2000)
- Highway (2005)
- Home (2007)
