= Greatest Hits (Trisha Yearwood album) =

Greatest hits album by Trisha Yearwood
- Released: September 11, 2007
- Genre: Country
- Length: 1:00:18
- Label: MCA Nashville
- Producers: Tony Brown; Garth Fundis; Harry Stinson; Mark Wright; Trisha Yearwood

Trisha Yearwood chronology
| Jasper County (2005) | Greatest Hits (2007) | Heaven, Heartache and the Power of Love (2007) |

Greatest Hits is the twelfth album by country singer Trisha Yearwood. The album is the final album released during Yearwood's association with the record company MCA, after she signed to Big Machine Records in early 2007. The album is composed of hits from her 16-year tenure with MCA, and features two previously unreleased tracks, "Just a Cup of Coffee" and "Nothin' to Lose." Both of these songs were recorded for Yearwood's 2005 album, Jasper County, but were not included on the album and are, as such, represented here as unfinished studio cuts. "Nothin' to Lose" was eventually recorded by fellow artist and former MCA labelmate, Reba McEntire, for her 2009 album Keep on Loving You.

The album sold 22,000 copies in its first week, debuting at #22 on the US Billboard 200 chart and at #2 on the Country Album chart. The album also peaked at #5 on the ARIA Country chart.

== Track listing ==
1. "She's in Love with the Boy" (Jon Ims) - 4:07
2. "Like We Never Had a Broken Heart" (Pat Alger, Garth Brooks) - 3:48
3. "The Woman Before Me" (Jude Johnstone) - 3:42
4. "Wrong Side of Memphis" (Gary Harrison, Matraca Berg) - 2:48
5. "Walkaway Joe" (Vince Melamed, Greg Barnhill) - 4:21
6. "The Song Remembers When" (Hugh Prestwood) - 3:56
7. "XXX's and OOO's (An American Girl)" (Berg, Alice Randall) - 2:49
8. "Thinkin' About You" (Bob Regan, Tom Shapiro) - 3:24
9. "Believe Me Baby (I Lied)" (Larry Gottlieb, Kim Richey) - 3:44
10. "Everybody Knows" (Berg, Harrison) - 3:16
11. "How Do I Live" (Diane Warren) - 4:04
12. "Perfect Love" (Sunny Russ, Stephony Smith) - 2:58
13. "There Goes My Baby" (Annie Roboff, Arnie Roman) - 3:51
14. "Powerful Thing" (Al Anderson, Sharon Vaughn) - 2:58
15. "I Would've Loved You Anyway" (Mary Danna, Troy Verges) - 3:43
16. "Just a Cup of Coffee" (Stephanie Davis) - 3:16
17. "Nothin' to Lose" (Kimberly Fox) - 3:33

== Chart performance ==
| Chart (2007) | Peak position |
|---|---|
| U.S. Billboard Top Country Albums | 2 |
| U.S. Billboard 200 | 22 |
