= List of awards and nominations received by Trisha Yearwood =

Trisha Yearwood awards and nominations
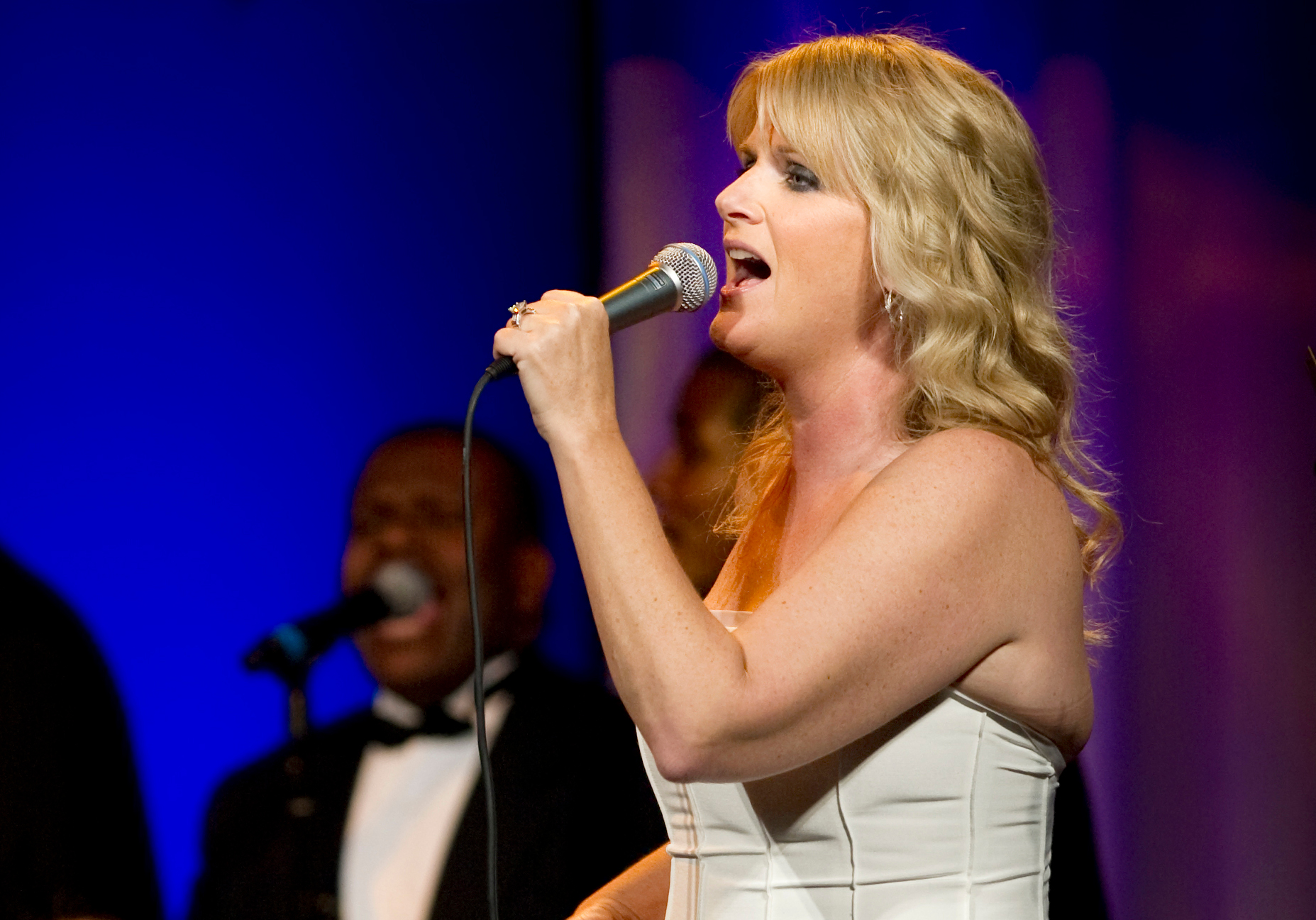
- Yearwood performing in 2010
Awards and nominations
Award	Wins	Nominations
Academy of Country Music	3	10
Emmy Awards	1	3
Grammy Awards	3	27
Country Music Association	3	16

Totals (Note: Certain award groups do not simply award one winner. They acknowledge several different recipients, have runners-up, and have third place. Since this is a specific recognition and is different from losing an award, runner-up mentions are considered wins in this award tally. For simplification and to avoid errors, each award in this list has been presumed to have had a prior nomination.)
- Wins: 11+
- Nominations: 58+

American country artist and television host Trisha Yearwood has received more than 58 award nominations and 11 wins. Yearwood has been nominated a total of 27 times from the Grammy Awards. Her first award from the association came in 1994 for her performance of "I Fall to Pieces", which won her and Aaron Neville the Best Country Collaboration with Vocals accolade. In 1997, she won both the award for Best Female Country Vocal Performance and the Best Country Collaboration with Vocals award. In addition, Yearwood has been given accolades from the Academy of Country Music. She won her first award in 1991 for Top Female Vocalist. She later won in both 1997 and 1998 for Top Female Vocalist. Yearwood has also won three accolades from the Country Music Association, including Female Vocalist of the Year. As a host of the Food Network television show Trisha's Southern Kitchen, Yearwood has been nominated three times for the Daytime Emmy Award for Outstanding Culinary Program, winning in 2013.

== American Music Awards ==
Year	Nominee / work	Award	Result	Ref.
1992	Trisha Yearwood	Favorite New Country Artist	Won	
1992	"She's in Love with the Boy"	Favorite Country Song	Nominated	
1998	(Songbook) A Collection of Hits	Favorite Country Album	Nominated	

== Academy of Country Music Awards ==
Year	Nominee / work	Award	Result	Ref.
1991	Trisha Yearwood	Top New Female Vocalist	Won	
1991	"She's in Love with the Boy"	Single Record of the Year	Nominated	
1993	Common Thread: The Songs of the Eagles	Album of the Year	Nominated	
1994	Trisha Yearwood & Aaron Neville	Top Vocal Duet	Nominated	
1996	Trisha Yearwood	Top Female Vocalist	Nominated	
1997	"In Another's Eyes" (with Garth Brooks)	Vocal Event of the Year	Nominated	
1997	Trisha Yearwood	Top Female Vocalist	Won	
1997	"How Do I Live"	Song of the Year	Nominated	
1997	"How Do I Live"	Single Record of the Year	Nominated	
1998	Trisha Yearwood	Top Female Vocalist	Nominated	
2001	Trisha Yearwood	Top Female Vocalist	Nominated	
2008	"Another Try" (with Josh Turner)	Vocal Event of the Year	Nominated	
2016	"Forever Country"	Video of the Year	Won	

== CMT Music Awards ==
Year	Nominee / work	Award	Result	Ref.
2024	Trisha Yearwood	June Carter Cash Humanitarian Award	Won	

== Country Music Association Awards ==
Year	Nominee / work	Award	Result	Ref.
1992	Trisha Yearwood	Female Vocalist of the Year	Nominated	
1992	Trisha Yearwood	Horizon Award	Nominated	
1993	Trisha Yearwood	Horizon Award	Nominated	
1993	"Walkaway Joe" (with Don Henley)	Vocal Event of the Year	Nominated	
1994	Common Thread: The Songs of the Eagles	Album of the Year	Won	
1994	Trisha Yearwood	Female Vocalist of the Year	Nominated	
1994	"I Fall to Pieces" (with Aaron Neville)	Vocal Event of the Year	Nominated	
1996	"On My Own" (with Linda Davis, Reba McEntire, and Martina McBride)	Vocal Event of the Year	Nominated	
1997	Everybody Knows	Album of the Year	Nominated	
1997	Trisha Yearwood	Female Vocalist of the Year	Won	
1998	Trisha Yearwood	Female Vocalist of the Year	Won	
1998	"In Another's Eyes" (with Garth Brooks)	Vocal Event of the Year	Nominated	
1999	Where Your Road Leads	Album of the Year	Nominated	
1999	Trisha Yearwood	Female Vocalist of the Year	Nominated	
2000	Trisha Yearwood	Female Vocalist of the Year	Nominated	
2001	Trisha Yearwood	Female Vocalist of the Year	Nominated	
2001	"I Would've Loved You Anyway"	Music Video of the Year	Nominated	
2002	Trisha Yearwood	Female Vocalist of the Year	Nominated	
2008	"Another Try" (with Josh Turner)	Vocal Event of the Year	Nominated	

== Daytime Emmy Awards ==
Year	Ceremony	Category	Result
2013	Daytime Emmy	Outstanding Culinary Program	Won
2017	Daytime Emmy	Outstanding Culinary Program	Nominated
2021	Daytime Emmy	Outstanding Culinary Program	Nominated

== Grammy Awards ==
Year	Nominee / work	Award	Result	Ref.
1991	"She's in Love with the Boy"	Best Female Country Vocal Performance	Nominated	
1993	"Walkaway Joe"	Best Female Country Vocal Performance	Nominated	
1994	"I Fall to Pieces" (with Aaron Neville)	Best Country Collaboration with Vocals	Won	
1994	The Song Remembers When	Best Country Album	Nominated	
1995	Thinkin' About You	Best Country Album	Nominated	
1995	"On My Own" (with Linda Davis, Reba McEntire, and Martina McBride)	Best Country Collaboration with Vocals	Nominated	
1996	"Believe Me Baby (I Lied)"	Best Female Country Vocal Performance	Nominated	
1996	Everybody Knows	Best Country Album	Nominated	
1996	"Hope: Country Music's Quest for a Cure" (with John Berry, Terri Clark, Vince Gill, Faith Hill, Tracy Lawrence, Little Texas, Neal McCoy, Tim McGraw, Lorrie Morgan, Marty Stuart and Travis Tritt)	Best Country Collaboration with Vocals	Nominated	
1997	"How Do I Live"	Best Female Country Vocal Performance	Won	
1997	"In Another's Eyes" (with Garth Brooks)	Best Country Collaboration with Vocals	Won	
1998	"There Goes My Baby"	Best Female Country Vocal Performance	Nominated	
1998	Where Your Road Leads	Best Country Album	Nominated	
1998	"Where Your Road Leads" (with Garth Brooks)	Best Country Collaboration with Vocals	Nominated	
2000	"Real Live Woman	Best Female Country Vocal Performance	Nominated	
2000	Real Live Woman	Best Country Album	Nominated	
2001	"I Would've Loved You Anyway"	Best Female Country Vocal Performance	Nominated	
2001	Inside Out	Best Country Album	Nominated	
2001	"Inside Out" (with Don Henley)	Best Country Collaboration with Vocals	Nominated	
2002	"Squeeze Me In" (with Garth Brooks)	Best Country Collaboration with Vocals	Nominated	
2005	"Georgia Rain"	Best Female Country Vocal Performance	Nominated	
2005	Jasper County	Best Country Album	Nominated	
2006	"Love Will Always Win" (with Garth Brooks)	Best Country Collaboration with Vocals	Nominated	
2007	"Heaven, Heartache and the Power of Love"	Best Female Country Vocal Performance	Nominated	
2008	"This Is Me You're Talking To"	Best Female Country Vocal Performance	Nominated	
2008	"Let the Wind Chase You" (with Keith Urban)	Best Country Collaboration with Vocals	Nominated	
2008	Heaven, Heartache and the Power of Love	Best Country Album	Nominated	
