= Icon (Trisha Yearwood album) =

Compilation album by Trisha Yearwood
- Released: August 31, 2010
- Recorded: 1991–2001
- Genre: Country; country pop
- Length: 42:58
- Label: MCA Nashville
- Producer: Tony Brown; Garth Fundis; Andy McKaie; Harry Stinson; Mark Wright; Trisha Yearwood

Trisha Yearwood chronology
Love Songs (2008)	Icon (2010)	PrizeFighter: Hit After Hit (2014)

Icon is a compilation album by American country artist Trisha Yearwood. It was released on August 31, 2010 via MCA Nashville Records and charted on the Billboard country albums chart. It was one of several compilations released by MCA following Yearwood's departure from the label in 2007. It contained a series of Yearwood's biggest hits from her years at the label.

== Background, release and reception ==
In early 2007, Trisha Yearwood left MCA Records, her record label since having her first major hit in 1991. She later moved to Big Machine Records to record one album before taking a hiatus from recording. Icon was among a series of compilation albums released by her former label in the wake of departure. It contained a total of 12 previously recorded hit singles by Yearwood between 1991 and 2001.

The album contained tracks cut by various record producers from Yearwood's collection. Seven of the album's tracks were produced by Garth Fundis. The hits, "How Do I Live," "Perfect Love" and "There Goes My Baby" were produced by Tony Brown. "I Would've Loved You Anyway" was produced by both Mark Wright and Yearwood herself. "XXX's and OOO's (An American Girl)" was produced by Harry Stinson. Andy McKaie produced the compilation itself.

Icon was released on August 31, 2010 via MCA Nashville. It was issued as a compact disc and was part of MCA's Icon compilation series. The album spent a total of six weeks on the Billboard Top Country Albums chart, reaching number 69 in October 2010. It was Yearwood's third compilation album to chart on a Billboard list. Icon received a positive review from Stephen Thomas Erlewine of Allmusic, who gave the release four out of five stars. "Universal’s 2010 collection Icon is an excellent 12-track sampler of Trisha Yearwood’s biggest hits," Erlewine wrote in 2010.

== Track listing ==
Icon (2010)
No.	Title	Writer(s)	Length
1.	"She's in Love with the Boy"	Jon Ims	4:06
2.	"Wrong Side of Memphis"	Matraca Berg; Gary Harrison	2:48
3.	"Walkaway Joe"	Greg Barnhill; Vince Melamed	4:21
4.	"The Song Remembers When"	Hugh Prestwood	3:56
5.	"XXX's and OOO's (An American Girl)"	Berg; Alice Randall	2:49
6.	"Thinkin' About You"	Bob Regan; Tom Shapiro	3:24
7.	"Believe Me Baby (I Lied)"	Larry Gottlieb; Angelo Petraglia; Kim Richey	3:44
8.	"Everybody Knows"	Berg; Harrison	3:16
9.	"How Do I Live"	Diane Warren	4:04
10.	"Perfect Love"	Sunny Russ; Stephony Smith	2:58
11.	"There Goes My Baby"	Annie Roboff; Arnie Roman	3:51
12.	"I Would've Loved You Anyway"	Mary Danna; Troy Verges	3:41
Total length:			42:58

== Personnel ==
All credits are adapted from liner notes of Icon.

Musical and technical personnel

- Tony Brown – producer
- Mark Diehl – design
- Jill Ettinger – product manager
- Jo Ann Frederick – A&R assistance
- Garth Fundis – producer
- Russ Harrington – photography
- Andy McKaie – compilation producer
- Ryan Null – photo coordination
- Beth Stempel – production manager
- Harry Stinson – producer
- Vartan – art direction
- Mark Wright – producer
- Trisha Yearwood – lead vocals, harmony vocals, producer

== Charts ==
Chart (2010)	Peak position
US Top Country Albums (Billboard)	69

== Release history ==
Region	Date	Format	Label	Ref.
Europe	August 31, 2010	Compact disc	MCA Nashville	
Indonesia	August 31, 2010	Compact disc	MCA Nashville	
United States	August 31, 2010	Compact disc	MCA Nashville	
