= PrizeFighter: Hit After Hit =

Studio album (re-recording) by Trisha Yearwood
- Released: November 17, 2014
- Recorded: 2010–2014
- Studio: Allentown Studios (Nashville, Tennessee); Sound Emporium (Nashville, Tennessee)
- Genre: Country; country pop
- Length: 1:01:47
- Label: Gwendolyn; RCA Nashville
- Producer: Garth Fundis; Mark Miller; Allen Reynolds

Trisha Yearwood chronology
Icon (2010)	PrizeFighter: Hit After Hit (2014)	Christmas Together (2016)

Singles from PrizeFighter: Hit After Hit
- 1. "PrizeFighter" Released: September 15, 2014; 2. "I Remember You" Released: March 9, 2015

PrizeFighter: Hit After Hit is a re-recorded studio album by American country artist Trisha Yearwood, released on November 17, 2014, via Gwendolyn Records and RCA Records Nashville. The album marked Yearwood's first release of new material since 2007's Heaven, Heartache and the Power of Love. PrizeFighter contained six new songs as well as ten re-recorded versions of her hits. Two singles were released to radio, including the title track, which became a charting single on the Billboard country chart. The album received mixed reviews from critics upon its release.

== Background ==
Following the release of 2007's Heaven, Heartache and the Power of Love, Trisha Yearwood took a hiatus from her music career. Yet, she began choosing songs for the project about four years prior to releasing it. After beginning the project, her mother was diagnosed with breast cancer. She eventually died in from the disease in 2011. Yearwood decided to ultimately focus on other projects. The project was put on hold for a while until she felt ready to return to it properly. She stayed with her former label, Big Machine Records, through 2012 but largely remained away from performing and recording. She hosted her own television cooking series on the Food Network and wrote two cookbooks. However, in 2014 she announced her return to music after signing with RCA Nashville. It would mark Yearwood's first album of new studio material in seven years.

== Content and recording ==
PrizeFighter comprised a total of 16 tracks. Ten of the tracks were some of Yearwood's biggest hits from her music career while the six remaining songs were entirely new. Although ten of Yearwood's former hits were chosen for the project, they were all re-recorded again. In a 2014 interview, Yearwood explained that she re-recorded the former hits "like a science experiment" by performing exactly the way they were first recorded. She stated that her voice sounded better than the originals, such as her 1991 hit "She's in Love with the Boy." The remainder of the album's tracks were brand new material.

Yearwood began recording the projects songs in 2010, according to The Tennessean. This included both the new material and the re-recorded songs. The material for the project was mainly recorded at two studios in Nashville, Tennessee: Sound Emporium and Allentown Studios. Yearwood mostly used the original record producers to help re-record her hits: Garth Fundis and Allen Reynolds. She also brought back Don Henley to cut "Walkaway Joe" and husband Garth Brooks to re-record "In Another's Eyes." She thanked both artists for returning to the project with her in the album's liner notes.

Among the album's new material was the song "PrizeFighter." The track featured harmony vocals from pop artist Kelly Clarkson. The song was co-written by Jessi Alexander, Sarah Buxton and Ross Copperman. "I love how PrizeFighter makes me feel…like even when the odds are against me, I can do anything. It’s a message we all need to hear, and the track just plain rocks!" Yearwood commented in 2014. Songwriter Matraca Berg helped compose the new song "End of the World" for the project. Berg had previously written some of Yearwood's biggest hits, including "Wrong Side of Memphis" and "XXX's and OOO's (An American Girl)." "She's the voice of a generation and absolutely one of our greatest singers of the last 30 years. I think it's really cool that she shows this body of her work. She's stronger than ever," Berg commented in 2014. Yearwood also commented on the album's other new tracks, "Met Him in a Motel Room," calling the story to have a "twist" that is unexpected.

== Critical reception ==
Professional ratings
Review scores
Source	Rating
Allmusic	3/5 stars
Country Universe	2/5 stars
Entertainment Focus	Favorable
Rolling Stone	Favorable

Following its release, PrizeFighter received mixed reviews from writers and critics. Stephen Thomas Erlewine of Allmusic gave the album three out of five possible stars. Erlewine questioned Yearwood's reasoning for only recording a handful of brand-new songs, but found it mostly an album of quality: " Yearwood has had more than ten hits -- and she's also had no fewer than five compilations -- but the hits here are well chosen and the new songs are solid enough to raise the question of why she didn't go all the way and craft a brand-new album. Nevertheless, Prizefighter: Hit After Hit winds up as an effective reminder of Yearwood's strengths."

Meanwhile, Kevin John Coyne of Country Universe only gave it two out of five stars in his review. Coyne praised the album's new tracks, such as "PrizeFighter," which he called "an inspiring, get back up when you fall power anthem." Yet, he largely disliked the newly-re-recorded hits. " It’s a shockingly deliberate act of deception, with intentionally misleading packaging meant to essentially trick the buyer into thinking they were getting Yearwood’s biggest hits with some new songs to sweeten the deal," Coyne commented.

Adam Gold of Rolling Stone largely praised PrizeFighter in his review of the album. He positively mentioned the album's new songs, including "Your Husband's Cheatin' on Us." Gold compared the track to that of The Chicks' "Goodbye Earl." Gold did not comment however on the album's re-recordings. Pip Ellwood Hughes of Entertainment Focus positively commented on the album in his 2014 review. Hughes called "Met Him a Motel Room" and "Your Husband's Cheatin' on Us" to be the record's best tracks. He then concluded by describing the album as a tease. "PrizeFighter: Hit After Hit is a timely reminder of what a force Trisha Yearwood is in country music and teases you with the promise of what’s to come. She may have turned 50 but she’s definitely still in the game."

== Release and chart performance ==
In August 2014, the album's title track was announced as the lead single. It was officially released to country radio on September 15, 2014. It was Yearwood's first single release to officially debut on the Billboard Country Airplay chart. It spent a total of eight weeks on the chart before peaking at number 42 in November 2014. It was Yearwood's first charting single as a solo artist since 2008. The album itself was officially released on November 17, 2014, in conjunction with her own record label (Gwendolyn Records) and RCA Records Nashville. The album was originally offered as a compact disc. The album was also offered as a music download only on the site GhostTunes. It was Yearwood's first album released exclusively with the music service.

Following its release, PrizeFighter entered the Billboard Top Country Albums chart. It spent a total of 14 weeks on the list and peaked at number seven in December 2014. It also spent two weeks on the Billboard 200 albums chart and peaked at number 33 in December. In its first week the album sold 13,000 copies. As of May 2015, it had sold 51,300 copies. On March 9, 2015, a second single was released "I Remember You."

== Track listing ==
PrizeFighter: Hit After Hit (2014)
No.	Title	Writer(s)	Length
1.	"PrizeFighter" (featuring Kelly Clarkson)	Jessi Alexander, Sarah Buxton, Ross Copperman	4:07
2.	"Wrong Side of Memphis"	Matraca Berg, Gary Harrison	2:46
3.	"I Remember You"	Kelly Archer, Ben Caver, Brad Rempel	4:01
4.	"Walkaway Joe" (featuring Don Henley)	Greg Barnhill, Vince Melamed	4:20
5.	"End of the World"	Shane McAnally, Josh Osborne, Trevor Rosen	3:34
6.	"In Another's Eyes" (with Garth Brooks)	Brooks, John Peppard, Bobby Wood	3:32
7.	"Perfect Love"	Sunny Russ, Stephony Smith	2:57
8.	"How Do I Live"	Diane Warren	4:02
9.	"Met Him in a Motel Room"	Rory Lee Feek, Jamie Teachenor	3:25
10.	"She's in Love with the Boy"	Jon Ims	4:08
11.	"Your Husband's Cheatin' on Us"	Berg, Marshall Chapman, Jill McCorkle	5:06
12.	"Heaven, Heartache and the Power of Love"	Clay Mills, Tia Sillers	3:48
13.	"Georgia Rain"	Ed Hill, Karyn Rochelle	5:11
14.	"You Can't Trust the Weatherman"	Ashley Gorley, Wade Kirby, Bryan Simpson	4:00
15.	"XXX's and OOO's (An American Girl)"	Berg, Alice Randall	2:47
16.	"The Song Remembers When"	Hugh Prestwood	3:54
Total length:			1:01:47

== Personnel ==
All credits are adapted from the liner notes of PrizeFighter: Hit After Hit.

- Trisha Yearwood – lead vocals, backing vocals (2, 6, 7, 8, 10, 11, 13), harmony vocals (9, 16)
- Blair Masters – keyboards (1, 5)
- Bobby Wood – acoustic piano (6, 9)
- Steve Nathan – organ (7, 15), keyboards (8), acoustic piano (16)
- Matt Rollings – keyboards (7, 8), Hammond B3 organ (14)
- John Barlow Jarvis – organ (11)
- Reese Wynans – Hammond B3 organ (12)
- John Hobbs – acoustic piano (13)
- Kenny Greenberg – electric guitar (1, 5, 11), acoustic guitar (5)
- Brent Mason – electric guitar (2, 4, 10, 14, 15, 16)
- Mark Casstevens – electric guitar (6)
- Steve Gibson – electric guitar (7, 8)
- Johnny Garcia – electric guitar (12, 13)
- John Jorgenson – electric guitar (13)
- Billy Joe Walker Jr. – acoustic guitar (2, 4, 7, 8, 10, 15, 16)
- Ben Caver – acoustic guitar (3)
- Chris Leuzinger – acoustic guitar (6), slide guitar (11), electric guitar (13),
- Mark Casstevens – electric guitar (6)
- Bryan Sutton – acoustic guitar (9, 11, 13), banjo (14)
- Steven Sheehan – acoustic guitar (12), National guitar (12)
- Jerry Douglas – dobro (4)
- Sam Bush – mandolin (12)
- Paul Franklin – steel guitar (2, 7, 8, 10, 15, 16)
- Bruce Bouton – steel guitar (6)
- Dan Dugmore – steel guitar (9, 13), lap steel guitar (12)
- Jimmie Lee Sloas – bass (1, 14)
- Dave Pomeroy – bass (2, 4, 10, 11, 15, 16)
- Glenn Worf – bass (5)
- Mike Chapman – bass (6)
- Michael Rhodes – bass (7, 8, 13)
- Steve Mackey – bass (12)
- Eddie Bayers – drums (1, 2, 4, 10, 11, 14, 15, 16)
- Greg Morrow – drums (5)
- Milton Sledge – drums (6)
- Paul Leim – drums (7, 8)
- Chad Cromwell – drums (12, 13)
- Eric Darken – percussion (12, 13)
- Rob Hajacos – fiddle (2, 10, 13, 15)
- Jimmy Mattingly – fiddle (14)
- Jim Horn – saxophone (8)
- Conni Ellisor – strings (3)
- Jim Ed Norman – string arrangements (6)
- Ronn Huff – string arrangements (8)
- Carl Marsh – string arrangements (11), string pad (16)
- David Campbell – string arrangements (13)
- The Nashville String Machine – strings (6, 8, 11, 13)
- John Catchings – cello (9)
- David Angell – viola (9)
- Kristin Wilkinson – viola (9), string arrangements (9)
- David Davidson – violin (9)
- Kelly Clarkson – harmony vocals (1)
- Raul Malo – backing vocals (2)
- Harry Stinson – backing vocals (2, 15)
- Beth Bernard – backing vocals (3)
- Don Henley – harmony vocals (4)
- Jessi Alexander – backing vocals (5, 12)
- Jon Randall – backing vocals (5, 12)
- Garth Brooks – lead vocals (6), backing vocals (6, 13)
- Garth Fundis – backing vocals (7, 10)
- Judson Spence – backing vocals (7, 8)
- Morgane Hayes – backing vocals (14)
- Sonya Isaacs – backing vocals (14)
- Kim Richey – backing vocals (15)

== Production ==
- Mark Miller – producer (1, 3, 5), recording (6), mixing (6)
- Garth Fundis – producer (2, 4, 7–16)
- Allen Reynolds – producer (6)
- Matthew "Buster" Allen – recording (1, 3, 5), mixing (14)
- Gary Laney – recording (2, 4, 10, 15, 16)
- Jeff Balding – recording (7, 8, 11, 13, 14)
- Gordon Hammond – recording (9)
- Chad Carlson – recording (12)
- Chuck Ainlay – mixing (2, 4, 7, 8, 10, 11, 13, 15, 16)
- Eric Conn – mastering
- Don Cobb – mastering
- Juanita Copeland – production coordinator
- Randee St. Nicholas – photography
- Swade Creative – art direction and design
- Earl Cox – hairstylist
- Mary Beth Felts – make-up
- Claudia Fowler – wardrobe styling

== Charts ==
=== Weekly charts ===
Chart (2014)	Peak position
UK Country Albums (Official Charts)	4
US Billboard 200	33
US Top Country Albums (Billboard)	7

=== Year-end charts ===
Chart (2015)	Position
US Top Country Albums (Billboard)	59

== Release history ==
Region	Date	Format	Label	Ref.
Australia	November 17, 2014	Compact disc	Gwendolyn Records; RCA Records Nashville	
United States	November 17, 2014	Compact disc	Gwendolyn Records; RCA Records Nashville	
United States	November 17, 2014	Music download	Gwendolyn Records; RCA Records Nashville	
