= Love Songs (Trisha Yearwood album) =

Compilation album by Trisha Yearwood
- Released: January 15, 2008
- Genre: Country
- Length: 52:48
- Label: MCA Nashville
- Producer: Various

Trisha Yearwood chronology
Heaven, Heartache, and the Power of Love (2007)	Love Songs (2008)	Icon (2010)

Professional ratings
Review scores
Source	Rating
Allmusic	3/5 stars

Love Songs is a compilation album by Trisha Yearwood, and was released by Universal Distribution in January 2008. It features 14 love songs from her career. It peaked at #35 on Top Country Albums chart.

== Track listing ==
1. "That's What I Like About You" (John Hadley, Kevin Welch, Wally Wilson) - 2:39
2. "She's in Love with the Boy" (Jon Ims) - 4:06
3. "Down on My Knees" (Beth Nielsen Chapman) - 3:55
4. "I Don't Fall in Love So Easy" (Rodney Crowell) - 4:15
5. "If I Ain't Got You" (Trey Bruce, Craig Wiseman) - 3:03
6. "The Nightingale" (Jude Johnstone) - 3:50
7. "Thinkin' About You" (Bob Regan, Tom Shapiro) - 3:25
8. "Maybe It's Love" (Chapman, Annie Roboff) - 5:04
9. "Powerful Thing" (Sunny Russ, Stephony Smith) - 2:58
10. "I'll Still Love You More" (Diane Warren) - 4:22
11. "One Love" (Al Anderson, Gary Nicholson, Kimmie Rhodes) - 4:23
12. "Love Alone" (Dan Colehour, David Grissom) - 4:19
13. "Baby Don't You Let Go" (Jessi Alexander, Austin Cunningham, Sonya Isaacs) - 2:45
14. "Sweet Love" (Tia Sillers, Wiseman) - 3:44

== Chart performance ==
Chart (2008)	Peak position
U.S. Billboard Top Country Albums	35
