= (Songbook) A Collection of Hits =

{Songbook} A Collection of Hits

Greatest hits album by Trisha Yearwood
- Released: August 26, 1997
- Genre: Country
- Length: 43:01
- Label: MCA
- Producer: Tony Brown (tracks 1, 6); Garth Fundis (tracks 2, 3, 5, 7–12); Allen Reynolds (track 4); Trisha Yearwood (tracks 1, 6)

Trisha Yearwood chronology
Everybody Knows (1996)	{Songbook} A Collection of Hits (1997)	Where Your Road Leads (1998)

Singles from (Songbook) A Collection of Hits
- 1. "How Do I Live" Released: May 23, 1997; 2. "In Another's Eyes" Released: August 18, 1997; 3. "Perfect Love" Released: January 12, 1998

Professional ratings
Review scores
Source	Rating
Allmusic	4.5/5 stars
Robert Christgau	(1-star Honorable Mention)
The Rolling Stone Album Guide	4/5 stars

(Songbook) A Collection of Hits is the first greatest hits album by American country music singer Trisha Yearwood. The album was Yearwood's first to reach #1 on the Billboard country albums chart. Due to the success of the single "How Do I Live" in Australia, the album was released there (in 1998) with six extra tracks, including a duet with Australian country star Lee Kernaghan. (Songbook) A Collection of Hits also peaked at number 5 on the ARIA country charts and 22 on the all genre. The album has been certified 4× Multi-Platinum by the RIAA for US shipments of 4 million copies. It has also been certified 2× Platinum in Canada and Platinum in Australia.

== Track listing ==
No.	Title	Writer(s)	Length
1.	"How Do I Live"	Diane Warren	4:02
2.	"The Song Remembers When"	Hugh Prestwood	3:54
3.	"Wrong Side of Memphis"	Gary Harrison, Matraca Berg	2:46
4.	"In Another's Eyes" (duet with Garth Brooks)	Garth Brooks, Bobby Wood, John Peppard	3:32
5.	"The Woman Before Me"	Jude Johnstone	3:48
6.	"Perfect Love"	Sunny Russ, Stephony Smith	2:56
7.	"Thinkin' About You"	Bob Regan, Tom Shapiro	3:23
8.	"Down on My Knees"	Beth Nielsen Chapman	3:52
9.	"She's in Love with the Boy"	Jon Ims	4:04
10.	"Walkaway Joe" (featuring Don Henley)	Vince Melamed, Greg Barnhill	4:19
11.	"XXX's and OOO's (An American Girl)"	Matraca Berg, Alice Randall	2:47
12.	"Like We Never Had a Broken Heart"	Pat Alger, Brooks	3:38

=== International version bonus tracks ===
No.	Title	Writer(s)	Length
13.	"A Lover Is Forever"	Steve Goodman, J. Fred Knobloch	3:44
14.	"Believe Me Baby (I Lied)"	Larry Gottlieb, Kim Richey	3:42
15.	"On a Bus to St. Cloud"	Gretchen Peters	4:42
16.	"You Can Sleep While I Drive"	Melissa Etheridge	3:15
17.	"The Flame"	Joe Henry, John Barlow Jarvis	5:50
18.	"Save the Land" (duet with Lee Kernaghan, only on the Australian version)	Lee Kernaghan	3:50

== Personnel ==
- Garth Brooks - background vocals, duet vocals on "In Another's Eyes"
- Larry Byrom - acoustic guitar
- Chuck Cannon - background vocals
- Mike Chapman - bass guitar
- Paul Franklin - steel guitar, lap steel guitar
- Garth Fundis - background vocals
- Steve Gibson - electric guitar
- Don Henley - duet vocals on "Walkaway Joe"
- Jim Horn - saxophone
- Ronn Huff - string arrangements, conductor
- Paul Leim - drums
- Raul Malo - background vocals
- The Nashville String Machine - strings
- Steve Nathan - keyboards
- Jim Ed Norman - string arrangements
- Michael Rhodes - bass guitar
- Kim Richey - background vocals
- Matt Rollings - keyboards
- Milton Sledge - drums
- Judson Spence - background vocals
- Harry Stinson - background vocals
- Lari White - background vocals
- Trisha Yearwood - lead vocals, background vocals

== Charts ==
=== Weekly charts ===
Chart (1997)	Peak position
Australian Albums (ARIA)	22
Canadian Albums (RPM)	5
Canadian Country Albums (RPM)	1
US Billboard 200	4
US Top Country Albums (Billboard)	1

=== Year-end charts ===
Chart (1997)	Position
US Billboard 200	59
US Top Country Albums (Billboard)	8
Chart (1998)	Position
US Billboard 200	71
US Top Country Albums (Billboard)	11

== Certifications ==
Region	Certification	Certified units/sales
Australia (ARIA)	Platinum	70,000^{^}
Canada (Music Canada)	2× Platinum	200,000^{^}
Indonesia	Gold	25,000
Malaysia	Gold	15,000
Philippines (PARI)	Gold	20,000^{*}
Taiwan (RIT)	Gold	25,000^{*}
Thailand	Gold	25,000
United Kingdom (BPI)	Silver	60,000^{‡}
United States (RIAA)	4× Platinum	4,000,000^{^}
^{*} Sales figures based on certification alone.^{^} Shipments figures based on certification alone.^{‡} Sales+streaming figures based on certification alone.
