= Hearts in Armor =

Studio album by Trisha Yearwood
- Released: September 1, 1992
- Recorded: 1992
- Studio: Sound Emporium (Nashville, Tennessee)
- Genre: Country
- Length: 37:23
- Label: MCA
- Producer: Garth Fundis

Trisha Yearwood chronology
Trisha Yearwood (1991)	Hearts in Armor (1992)	The Song Remembers When (1993)

Singles from Hearts in Armor
- 1. "Wrong Side of Memphis" Released: August 8, 1992; 2. "Walkaway Joe" Released: November 2, 1992; 3. "You Say You Will" Released: March 1, 1993; 4. "Down on My Knees" Released: June 7, 1993

Professional ratings
Review scores
Source	Rating
Allmusic	4.5/5 stars
Chicago Tribune	4/4 stars
Entertainment Weekly	A+
Los Angeles Times	3.5/4 stars
Q	3/5 stars
Robert Christgau	(choice cut)
Rolling Stone	3.5/5 stars

Hearts in Armor is the second studio album by American country music singer Trisha Yearwood. It was released on September 1, 1992, by MCA Nashville.

Four of its tracks found spots in the Billboard Hot Country Singles chart in 1992 and 1993: "Wrong Side of Memphis" rose to No. 5, "You Say You Will" to No. 12, and "Down on My Knees" to No. 19. The album rose to No. 12 in the Billboard country albums chart.

The album was released immediately following Yearwood's divorce with her first husband, and has been considered one of her greatest albums. It was met with mostly positive reviews by critics. The album includes a variety of styles, including slow ballads and fast up-tempo material. Three of the album's tracks feature guest harmony vocalists: "Woman Walk the Line" (originally performed by Emmylou Harris on her album The Ballad of Sally Rose) features background vocals from Harris. Raul Malo of The Mavericks is featured on "For Reasons I've Forgotten" and "Wrong Side of Memphis".

== Track listing ==
CD
No.	Title	Writer(s)	Harmony vocals	Length
1.	"Wrong Side of Memphis"	Gary Harrison; Matraca Berg	Harry Stinson; Raul Malo; Yearwood	2:46
2.	"Nearest Distant Shore"	Harrison; Tim Mensy	Garth Brooks	3:23
3.	"You Say You Will"	Beth Nielsen Chapman; Verlon Thompson	Malo; Yearwood	3:38
4.	"Walkaway Joe"	Vince Melamed; Greg Barnhill	Don Henley	4:19
5.	"Woman Walk the Line"	Emmylou Harris; Paul Kennerley	Harris	4:31
6.	"Oh Lonesome You"	Jamie O'Hara; Kieran Kane	Vince Gill	2:58
7.	"Down on My Knees"	Chapman		3:52
8.	"For Reasons I've Forgotten"	O'Hara	Malo	3:56
9.	"You Don't Have to Move That Mountain"	Keith Whitley	Gill	3:37
10.	"Hearts in Armor"	Jude Johnstone	Henley	4:23
Total length:				37:23

== Personnel ==
- Trisha Yearwood – lead vocals

Musicians

- Matt Rollings – acoustic piano (1–7, 9, 10)
- Steve Nathan – acoustic piano (8)
- Brent Mason – electric guitars (1–9)
- Billy Joe Walker, Jr. – acoustic guitar (1, 3–6, 8)
- Tim Mensy – acoustic guitar (2)
- Don Potter – acoustic guitar (2, 7, 9)
- Weldon Myrick – steel guitar (1, 2, 5, 6, 9)
- Buddy Emmons – steel guitar (8)
- Jerry Douglas – dobro (4)
- Sam Bush – mandolin (5, 6)
- Dave Pomeroy – bass (1–7, 9)
- Glenn Worf – bass (8)
- Eddie Bayers – drums (1–9)
- Rob Hajacos – fiddle (1, 8)
- Stuart Duncan – fiddle (5, 6)
- Kristin Wilkinson – viola (10)

== Production ==
- Garth Fundis – producer, mixing
- Gary Laney – recording, mixing
- Linelle – recording assistant
- Dave Sinko – recording assistant, mixing
- Denny Purcell – mastering
- Georgetown Masters (Nashville, Tennessee) – mastering location
- Scott Pascahll – production assistant
- Bill Brunt Designs – art direction, design
- Jim "Señor" McGuire – front cover photography
- Randee St. Nicholas – additional photography
- Maria Von Matthiessen – additional photography
- Sheri McCoy – stylist

== Charts ==
=== Album ===
Chart (1992–1994)	Peak position
Australian Albums (ARIA)	162
U.S. Billboard Top Country Albums	12
U.S. Billboard 200	46
Canadian RPM Country Albums	7

=== Certifications ===
Certifications for "Hearts in Armor"
Region	Certification	Certified units/sales
Canada (Music Canada)	Platinum	100,000^{^}
United States (RIAA)	Platinum	1,000,000^{^}
^{^} Shipments figures based on certification alone.

=== Singles ===
Year	Single	Peak positions		
Year	Single	US Country	CAN Country	
1992	"Wrong Side of Memphis"	5	4	
1992	1993	"You Say You Will"	12	24
"Down on My Knees"	1993	19	21	
