= Trisha Yearwood (album) =

Studio album by Trisha Yearwood
- Released: July 2, 1991
- Recorded: 1990–1991
- Studio: Sound Emporium (Nashville, Tennessee)
- Genre: Country
- Length: 35:14
- Label: MCA
- Producer: Garth Fundis

Trisha Yearwood chronology
Trisha Yearwood (1991)	Hearts in Armor (1992)

Singles from Trisha Yearwood
- 1. "She's in Love with the Boy" Released: March 1991; 2. "Like We Never Had a Broken Heart" Released: September 9, 1991; 3. "That's What I Like About You" Released: December 21, 1991; 4. "The Woman Before Me" Released: March 23, 1992

Professional ratings
Review scores
Source	Rating
AllMusic	4.5/5 stars
Chicago Tribune	4/4 stars
Entertainment Weekly	A
Los Angeles Times	2/4 stars
The Rolling Stone Album Guide	3.5/5 stars

Trisha Yearwood is the debut studio album by American country music singer Trisha Yearwood, released on July 2, 1991, by MCA Records. The album reached number 2 on Billboard's Top Country Albums chart, and was certified 2× Platinum for sales of two million copies. It features her first Billboard Hot Country Songs hit "She's in Love with the Boy", which reached the top of the country charts in August 1991. Also included are follow-up hits "Like We Never Had a Broken Heart" at 4, "That's What I Like About You" at 8, and "The Woman Before Me" also at 4.

The track "Victim of the Game" was originally recorded by Yearwood's friend and future husband, Garth Brooks, for his 1990 album No Fences. "That's What I Like About You" was also recorded by James House on his 1990 album Hard Times for an Honest Man.

== Track listing ==
1. "She's in Love with the Boy" (Jon Ims) – 4:08
2. "The Woman Before Me" (Jude Johnstone) – 3:50
3. "That's What I Like About You" (John Hadley, Kevin Welch, Wally Wilson) – 2:40
4. "Like We Never Had a Broken Heart" (Pat Alger, Garth Brooks) – 3:41
5. "Fools Like Me" (Kostas, Hal Ketchum) – 4:00
6. "Victim of the Game" (Brooks, Mark D. Sanders) – 3:13
7. "When Goodbye Was a Word" (Gene Nelson, Paul Nelson) – 3:11
8. "The Whisper of Your Heart" (Chuck Cannon) – 3:37
9. "You Done Me Wrong (And That Ain't Right)" (Pat McLaughlin) – 3:18
10. "Lonesome Dove" (Carl Jackson, Larry Cordle) – 3:36

== Personnel ==
As listed in the liner notes.

- Trisha Yearwood – lead vocals, backing vocals (1, 5)
- Matt Rollings – piano (1–7, 10)
- Al Kooper – organ (5)
- John Barlow Jarvis – organ (8), piano (9)
- Bobby All – acoustic guitar (1, 3, 5, 6, 10)
- Brent Mason – electric guitar (1–6, 8–10)
- Mac McAnally – acoustic guitar (2, 7–10), backing vocals (5)
- Pat Alger – acoustic guitar (4)
- Paul Franklin – steel guitar (1–4, 6, 8), lap steel guitar (9)
- Jerry Douglas – Dobro (10)
- Dave Pomeroy – bass guitar (1–6, 8–10)
- Eddie Bayers – drums (1–6, 8–10)
- Rob Hajacos – fiddle (1, 3, 6, 9)
- Stuart Duncan – fiddle (4, 10)
- Kirk "Jelly Roll" Johnson – harmonica (8)
- Grace Bahng – cello (7)
- Kristin Wilkinson – viola (7)
- David Davidson – violin (7)
- Connie Heard – violin (7)
- Edgar Meyer – string arrangements (7)
- Garth Fundis – backing vocals (1, 5)
- Garth Brooks – backing vocals (4, 6)
- Vince Gill – backing vocals (10)

=== Technical personnel ===
- Garth Fundis – producer, mixing
- Gary Laney – recording
- Dave Sinko – recording assistant
- Denny Purcell – mastering
- Georgetown Masters (Nashville, Tennessee) – mastering location
- Jim Kemp – creative direction
- Katherine DeVault – art direction, design
- Jim McGuire – photography
- Robert Davis – hair stylist
- June Arnold – make-up
- Sheri McCoy – wardrobe
- Ann Rice – wardrobe
- Profile – wardrobe

== Charts ==
=== Weekly charts ===
Weekly chart performance for Trisha Yearwood
Chart (1991–1994)	Peak position
Australian Albums (ARIA)	164
US Billboard 200	31
US Top Country Albums (Billboard)	2

=== Year-end charts ===
Year-end chart performance for Trisha Yearwood
Chart	Year	Position
US Top Country Albums (Billboard)	1991	34
US Billboard 200	1992	81
US Top Country Albums (Billboard)	1992	13

== Certifications ==
Certifications for Trisha Yearwood
Region	Certification	Certified units/sales
Canada (Music Canada)	Gold	50,000^{^}
United States (RIAA)	2× Platinum	2,000,000^{^}
^{^} Shipments figures based on certification alone.
