= Inside Out (Trisha Yearwood album) =

Studio album by Trisha Yearwood
- Released: June 5, 2001
- Recorded: December 2000 – early 2001
- Studio: Sound Kitchen (Franklin, TN)
- Genre: Country
- Length: 44:56
- Label: MCA Nashville
- Producer: Mark Wright; Trisha Yearwood

Trisha Yearwood chronology
Real Live Woman (2000)	Inside Out (2001)	Jasper County (2005)

Singles from Inside Out
- 1. "I Would've Loved You Anyway" Released: March 19, 2001; 2. "Inside Out" Released: November 12, 2001; 3. "I Don't Paint Myself into Corners" Released: July 1, 2002

Inside Out is the ninth studio album by American country music artist Trisha Yearwood. It was released on June 5, 2001, via MCA Nashville and was produced by Mark Wright and Yearwood.

Positively commented on by music critics, Inside Out became her first studio album to top the US Top Country Albums chart and her second overall after her compilation (Songbook) A Collection of Hits (1997). Three official singles were released from the album, with "I Would've Loved You Anyway" being the most successful. It peaked at number four on the US Billboard Hot Country Songs chart, becoming her 19th and final top-ten hit to date. Covers of Bryan Adams and Rebecca Lynn Howard's songs, "Inside Out" and "I Don't Paint Myself into Corners" (the former being a duet with Eagles frontman Don Henley), were released as the second and third singles but had less success.

At the 44th Annual Grammy Awards in 2002, Yearwood received three nominations for Best Country Album, Best Female Country Vocal Performance for "I Would've Loved You Anyway", and Best Country Collaboration with Vocals for "Inside Out"; she lost all her nominations however as the first award went to Timeless - Hank Williams Tribute, the second to "Shine" by Dolly Parton, and the third to "I am a Man Of Constant Sorrow" from the Soggy Bottom Boys.

== Background ==
After the release of her previous album Real Live Woman (2000), Yearwood explained she didn't know how to follow up the record as she felt she and collaborator Garth Fundis had made the best albums of their career. She decided to switch producers to Mark Wright for this album.

== Singles ==
Three official singles were released from the album.

"I Would've Loved You Anyway" was serviced as the album's lead single on March 19, 2001. A song about coming to terms with a breakup, it garnered positive reviews with Billboard writing, "This affecting ballad...demonstrates this enduring singer's consistent ability to wring out emotion without going overboard." It debuted at number 48 on the US Billboard Hot Country Songs chart (then titled Hot Country Singles & Tracks) the week of April 7, 2001, and peaked at number four on the chart the week of September 29, 2001, becoming her 19th and to date, final top ten single on the chart.

The Don Henley duet "Inside Out" was the album's second single, released on November 12, 2001. The song is a country duet with influences of funk and R&B. It was originally recorded by Bryan Adams for his 1998 album On a Day Like Today where it was released a single from in 2000. Deborah Evans Price of Billboard gave the track a positive review saying "it has an insinuating groove, memorable melody, and an infectious hook" and also praised the chemistry between the two stars. However, it was less successful, hitting number 31 on the country airplay chart.

"I Don't Paint Myself into Corners" was the third and final single released, added to stations on July 1, 2002. It was co-written and originally recorded by country artist Rebecca Lynn Howard in 2000 for her self-titled debut album, where it became a minor hit upon its release as a single from that record. The track proved not a success, hitting number 47 on the Hot Country Singles & Tracks chart where it was her fourth single to peak outside the top-forty.

== Critical reception ==
Professional ratings
Aggregate scores
Source	Rating
Metacritic	(75/100)
Review scores
Source	Rating
About.com	4/5 stars
Allmusic	4/5 stars
Billboard	(favorable)
E! Online	B−
Entertainment Weekly	B
Q	3/5 stars
Rolling Stone	4/5 stars

Inside Out received positive reviews from music critics. Metacritic rated the album a 75 out of 100, indicating generally positive reviews.

== Commercial performance ==
Inside Out debuted at number one on the US Billboard Top Country Albums chart the week of June 23, 2001, with first week sales of 44,000 copies, becoming her first studio album to top the chart and her second project overall. It spent one week atop the chart before being displaced by the O Brother, Where Art Thou? soundtrack, falling to number four. It spent 60 weeks overall on the chart. The album also debuted at number 29 on the all-genre Billboard 200, spending 19 weeks in total.

== Track listing ==
No.	Title	Writer(s)	Length
1.	"Love Alone"	Dan Colehour; David Grissom	4:19
2.	"I Would've Loved You Anyway"	Mary Danna; Troy Verges	3:41
3.	"For a While"	Matraca Berg; Ronnie Samoset	3:25
4.	"Seven Year Ache" (background vocals from Rosanne Cash)	Rosanne Cash	3:35
5.	"I Don't Paint Myself into Corners" (background vocals from Vince Gill)	Trey Bruce; Rebecca Lynn Howard	4:11
6.	"Harmless Heart"	Kim Patton-Johnston; Liz Rose	3:27
7.	"Inside Out" (duet with Don Henley)	Bryan Adams; Gretchen Peters	3:34
8.	"Love Let Go"	Hugh Prestwood	4:10
9.	"Melancholy Blue"	Tom Douglas; Harlan Howard	3:39
10.	"Second Chance"	Irene Kelley; Clay Mills; Tony Ramey	3:06
11.	"Love Me or Leave Me Alone"	Karyn Rochelle; Shaye Smith	3:30
12.	"When We Were Still in Love"	Jude Johnstone	4:19
Total length:			44:56

Unlisted track on Club Edition releases
No.	Title	Writer(s)	Duet partner(s)	Length
13.	"Squeeze Me In" (also on Garth Brooks' album Scarecrow)	Delbert McClinton; Gary Nicholson	Garth Brooks	3:30
Total length:				48:26

== Personnel ==
- Trisha Yearwood – lead vocals, backing vocals
- Steve Nathan – acoustic piano, keyboards
- Matt Rollings – acoustic piano, keyboards, clavinet
- B. James Lowry – acoustic guitars
- Brent Rowan – electric guitars
- Steuart Smith – electric guitars
- Paul Franklin – steel guitar
- Michael Rhodes – bass guitar
- Shannon Forrest – drums
- Eric Darken – percussion
- Jim Hoke – harmonica
- Jim Horn – saxophone
- Bobby Keys – saxophone
- Vicki Hampton – backing vocals
- Liana Manis – backing vocals
- Kim Richey – backing vocals
- Karyn Rochelle – backing vocals
- Rosanne Cash – backing vocals (4)
- Vince Gill – backing vocals (5)
- Don Henley – lead and backing vocals (7)
- Garth Brooks – lead and backing vocals (13)

Strings

- Kristin Wilkinson – string arrangements and conductor
- Craig Nelson – bass
- John Catchings – cello
- Monisa Angell – viola
- Jim Grosjean – viola
- David Davidson – violin
- Carl Gorodetzky – violin
- Gary Vanosdale – violin

== Production ==
- Mark Wright – producer (1–12)
- Trisha Yearwood – producer (1–12)
- Allen Reynolds – producer (13)
- Greg Droman – recording, mixing, overdub recording
- Steve Marcantonio – overdub recording
- Justin Niebank – recording
- Tony Green – assistant engineer
- Todd Gunnerson – assistant engineer, mix assistant
- Hank Williams – mastering
- MasterMix (Nashville, Tennessee) – mastering location
- Jessie Noble – project coordinator
- Virginia Team – art direction
- Chris Ferrara – design
- Russ Harrington – photography
- Sheri McCoy – stylist
- Maria Smoot – hair stylist
- Mary Beth Felts – make-up

== Charts ==
=== Weekly charts ===
Chart (2001)	Peak position
Australian Albums (ARIA)	167
US Billboard 200	29
US Top Country Albums (Billboard)	1
UK Country Albums (OCC)	3
Scottish Albums (OCC)	99

=== Year-end charts ===
Chart (2001)	Position
Canadian Country Albums (Nielsen SoundScan)	43
US Top Country Albums (Billboard)	32
Chart (2002)	Position
US Top Country Albums (Billboard)	68
UK Country Albums (OCC)	3

=== Singles ===
Year	Single	Chart Positions	
Year	Single	US Country	US
2001	"I Would've Loved You Anyway"	4	44
2001	"Inside Out" (with Don Henley)	31	—
2002	"I Don't Paint Myself into Corners"	47	—

== Certifications ==
Region	Certification	Certified units/sales
United States (RIAA)	Gold	500,000^{^}
^{^} Shipments figures based on certification alone.
