= Jasper County (album) =

Studio album by Trisha Yearwood
- Released: September 13, 2005
- Studio: Sound Emporium (Nashville, Tennessee)
- Genre: Country
- Length: 38:08
- Label: MCA Nashville
- Producer: Garth Fundis

Trisha Yearwood chronology
Inside Out (2001)	Jasper County (2005)	Greatest Hits (2007)

Singles from Jasper County
- 1. "Georgia Rain" Released: April 25, 2005; 2. "Trying to Love You" Released: November 2005

Professional ratings
Aggregate scores
Source	Rating
Metacritic	(85/100)
Review scores
Source	Rating
About.com	5/5 stars
AllMusic	4.5/5 stars
Billboard	(favorable)
Chicago Tribune	(favorable)
Entertainment Weekly	B−
The New York Times	(average)
People	3/4 stars
PopMatters	9/10 stars
Stylus Magazine	A−
USA Today	3.5/4 stars

Jasper County is the tenth studio album by American country music singer Trisha Yearwood. It was Yearwood's first studio album in four years since 2001's Inside Out.

Yearwood took a four-year break from recording after 2001 mainly because she began a relationship with Garth Brooks (whom she would later marry) and creative time. It was given a positive review by AllMusic, who called the album "one of her very best records."

The album reached number 1 on the Billboard country albums chart. It was also her highest peak on the Billboard 200, peaking at number 4. Her final album for MCA Nashville, it produced the singles "Georgia Rain" and "Trying to Love You", which peaked at number 15 and number 52, respectively, on the Hot Country Songs charts; the latter was also a number 28 hit on the Hot Adult Contemporary Tracks charts. Later presses of the album also included "Love Will Always Win", a number 23-peaking duet with her husband, Garth Brooks, which was also on Brooks's 2006 The Lost Sessions album. The track "Who Invented the Wheel" was originally recorded by Anthony Smith on his debut album If That Ain't Country.

== Track listing ==
No.	Title	Writer(s)	Length
1.	"Who Invented the Wheel"	Anthony Smith; Bobby Terry; Craig Wiseman	3:24
2.	"Pistol"	Al Anderson; Leslie Satcher	3:19
3.	"Trying to Love You"	Beth Nielsen Chapman; Bill Lloyd	3:48
4.	"River of You"	Marvin Green; Satcher	3:37
5.	"Baby Don't You Let Go"	Jessi Alexander; Austin Cunningham; Sonya Isaacs	2:45
6.	"Standing Out in a Crowd"	Sarah Majors; Maia Sharp	3:21
7.	"Georgia Rain"	Ed Hill; Karyn Rochelle	5:11
8.	"Sweet Love"	Wiseman; Tia Sillers	3:46
9.	"Try Me" (background vocals by Ronnie Dunn)	Stephanie Chapman; Liz Rose	3:12
10.	"Gimme the Good Stuff"	Angelo Petraglia; George Ducas; Hillary Lindsey	3:33
11.	"It's Alright"	Anderson; Satcher	2:12
12.	"Love Will Always Win" (duet with Garth Brooks)	Gordon Kennedy; Wayne Kirkpatrick	4:39
Total length:			38:08

Notes

- "Love Will Always Win" was only included on 2006 re-release.

== Personnel ==
- Trisha Yearwood – lead vocals, backing vocals (3, 7)
- Matt Rollings – acoustic piano (1)
- Reese Wynans – organ (1, 11), acoustic piano (2, 11)
- Steve Nathan – acoustic piano (3)
- John Hobbs – organ (4, 9), acoustic piano (7)
- Steve Cox – organ (6, 8, 10)
- Mac McAnally – acoustic guitar (1, 3)
- Bryan Sutton – acoustic guitar (1, 5–11), acoustic slide guitar (2), acoustic baritone guitar (5), mandocello (6)
- Kurt Riles – acoustic guitar (4)
- Richard Bennett – acoustic guitar (11), electric guitar (11)
- Tom Bukovac – electric guitar (1, 3), acoustic guitar (3)
- Johnny Garcia – electric guitar (1, 4–11)
- John Jorgenson – electric guitar (1, 7)
- Al Anderson – electric guitar (2)
- Chris Leuzinger – electric guitar (7, 10)
- Paul Franklin – steel guitar (1)
- Aubrey Haynie – fiddle (1), mandolin (3)
- Wanda Vick – fiddle (2, 4), dobro (4)
- Sam Bush – mandolin (5)
- Dan Dugmore – lap steel guitar (5, 8), electric guitar (6, 9, 10, 11), steel guitar (7, 9)
- Rob Hajacos – fiddle (7)
- Michael Rhodes – bass
- Chad Cromwell – drums (1, 4–11), sticks (4)
- Shannon Forrest – drums (2)
- Greg Morrow – drums (3)
- Eric Darken – shaker (3), percussion (4, 6, 7, 9, 10), hubcap (4)
- Terry McMillan – leg slaps (5), harmonica (5)
- David Campbell – string arrangements and conductor (3, 6)
- The Nashville String Machine – strings (3, 6)
- Bekka Bramlett – backing vocals (1, 2)
- Anthony Smith – backing vocals (1)
- Beth Nielsen Chapman – backing vocals (3)
- Wes Hightower – backing vocals (3, 4)
- Leslie Satcher – backing vocals (4)
- Jessi Alexander – backing vocals (5)
- Jon Randall – backing vocals (5)
- Maia Sharp – backing vocals (6)
- Garth Brooks – backing vocals (7), lead vocals (12)
- Bob Bailey – backing vocals (8)
- Kim Fleming – backing vocals (8)
- Vicki Hampton – backing vocals (8)
- Ronnie Dunn – backing vocals (9)
- Hillary Lindsey – backing vocals (10)
- Jim Lauderdale – backing vocals (11)

The Nashville String Machine

- Anthony LaMarchina and Carole Rabinowitz – cello
- Monisa Angell, Jim Grosjean and Kristin Wilkinson – viola
- David Angell, David Davidson, Conni Ellisor, Carl Gorodetzky, Pamela Sixfin, Alan Umstead, Cathy Umstead and Mary Kathryn Vanosdale – violin

The Alright Boys on "It's Alright"

- Steve Cox, Chad Cromwell, Dan Dugmore, Garth Fundis, Johnny Garcia, Scott Paschall, Michael Rhodes and Bryan Sutton

== Production ==
- Garth Fundis – producer
- Matt Andrews – recording (1, 3)
- Jeff Balding – recording (2, 4–11), mixing
- Chad Carlson – additional recording, recording assistant, mix assistant
- Jesse Amend – technical assistant
- Jay Fenstermaker – technical assistant
- Erick Jaskowiak – technical assistant
- Bob Ludwig – mastering
- Gateway Mastering (Portland, Maine) – mastering location
- Scott Paschall – production assistant
- Ron Roark – graphic design
- Virginia Team – art direction
- Luellyn Latocki – art direction
- Russ Harrington – photography
- Beth Barnard – additional photography
- Gwen Yearwood – additional photography
- Libby Mitchell – wardrobe stylist
- Sheri McCoy-Haynes – wardrobe stylist
- Debra Wingo – hair stylist
- Mary Beth Felts – make-up
- Vector Managerment – management team

== Charts ==
=== Weekly charts ===
Chart (2005)	Peak position
Australian Albums (ARIA)	146
US Billboard 200	4
US Top Country Albums (Billboard)	1
UK Country Albums (OCC)	2

=== Year-end charts ===
Chart (2005)	Position
US Top Country Albums (Billboard)	41
Chart (2006)	Position
US Top Country Albums (Billboard)	59

=== Singles ===
Year	Single	Chart Positions			
Year	Single	US Country	US	US Pop	US AC
2005	"Georgia Rain"	15	78	99	—
2005	"Trying to Love You"	52	—	–	28
2006	"Love Will Always Win"	23	—	—	—

== Certifications ==
Region	Certification	Certified units/sales
United States (RIAA)	Gold	500,000^{^}
^{^} Shipments figures based on certification alone.
