= That's What I Like About You =

Single by Trisha Yearwood

from the album Trisha Yearwood
- B-side: "When Goodbye Was a Word"
- Released: December 21, 1991
- Studio: Sound Emporium (Nashville, Tennessee)
- Genre: Country
- Length: 2:40
- Label: MCA
- Songwriters: Kevin Welch; John Hadley; Wally Wilson
- Producer: Garth Fundis

Trisha Yearwood singles chronology
"Like We Never Had a Broken Heart" (1991)	"That's What I Like About You" (1991)	"The Woman Before Me" (1992)

"That's What I Like About You" is a song written by Kevin Welch, Wally Wilson, and John Hadley. It was originally recorded by James House for his 1990 album Hard Times for an Honest Man.

It was later recorded by American country music artist Trisha Yearwood. It was released in December 1991 as the third single from her debut album Trisha Yearwood. The song reached number 8 on the US Billboard Hot Country Singles & Tracks chart.

== Music video ==
The music video was directed by Gerry Wenner and premiered in late 1991.

== Charts ==
=== Weekly charts ===
Chart (1991–1992)	Peak position
Canada Country Singles (RPM)	4
US Hot Country Songs (Billboard)	8

=== Year-end charts ===
Chart (1992)	Position
Canada Country Tracks (RPM)	65
US Country Songs (Billboard)	75
