= Grammy Award for Best Country Collaboration with Vocals =

Music award

- Awarded for: quality country music collaborations with vocals
- Country: United States
- Presented by: National Academy of Recording Arts and Sciences
- First award: 1988
- Final award: 2011
- Website: grammy.com

The Grammy Award for Best Country Collaboration with Vocals was an honor presented at the Grammy Awards, a ceremony that was established in 1958 and originally called the Gramophone Awards, to quality country music collaborations for artists who do not normally perform together. Honors in several categories are presented at the ceremony annually by the National Academy of Recording Arts and Sciences of the United States to "honor artistic achievement, technical proficiency and overall excellence in the recording industry, without regard to album sales or chart position".

Originally called the Best Country Vocal Performance, Duet, the award was first presented to Kenny Rogers and Ronnie Milsap at the 30th Grammy Awards in 1988 for the single "Make No Mistake, She's Mine". The next year, the category's name was changed to Best Country Vocal Collaboration, a name it held until 1996 when it was awarded as the Best Country Collaboration with Vocals. In 2011, the category was merged with the Grammy Award for Best Country Performance by a Duo or Group with Vocal and the Grammy Award for Best Country Instrumental Performance, forming the Grammy Award for Best Country Duo/Group Performance in order to "tighten the number of categories" at the Grammy Awards.

Alison Krauss holds the record for having the most wins in this category, with a total of five. She is followed by seven others, who have all won the award twice. Among the most nominated are Emmylou Harris and Willie Nelson, both nine-time nominees. Krauss was nominated eight times, while Dolly Parton was a seven-time hopeful. Nominated bands include 1996 winners Shenandoah, a five-man country music band, three-time nominees the Nitty Gritty Dirt Band, as well as one of the award's final recipients, the Zac Brown Band.

== Recipients ==
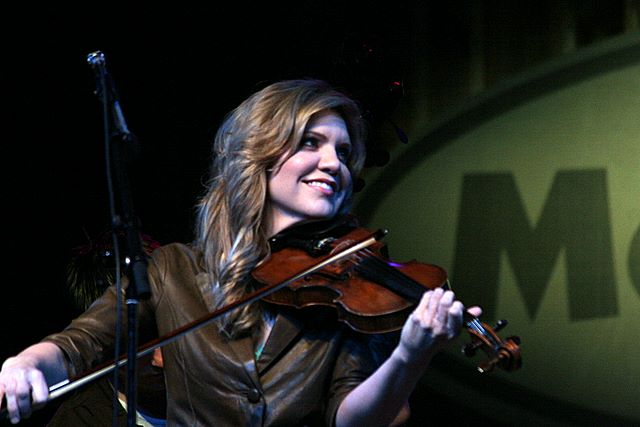
Five-time award winner Alison Krauss

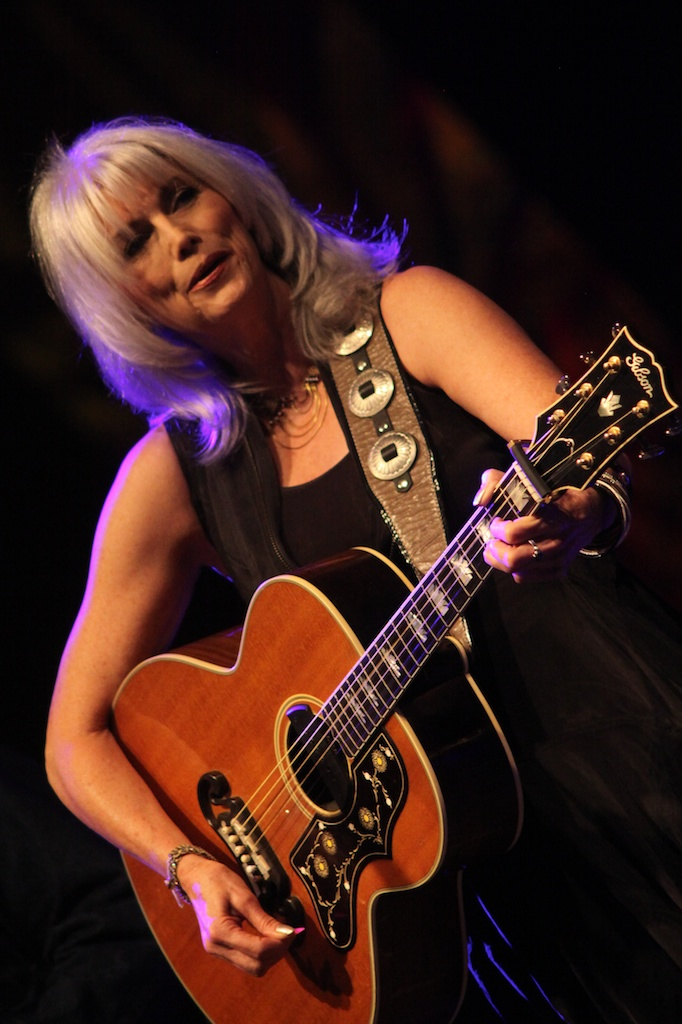
1999 and 2000 award winner Emmylou Harris

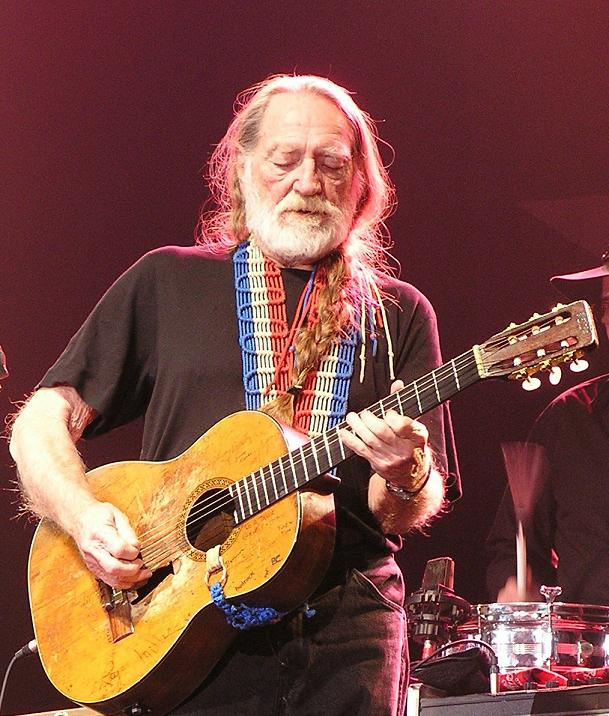
2003 and 2008 award winner Willie Nelson

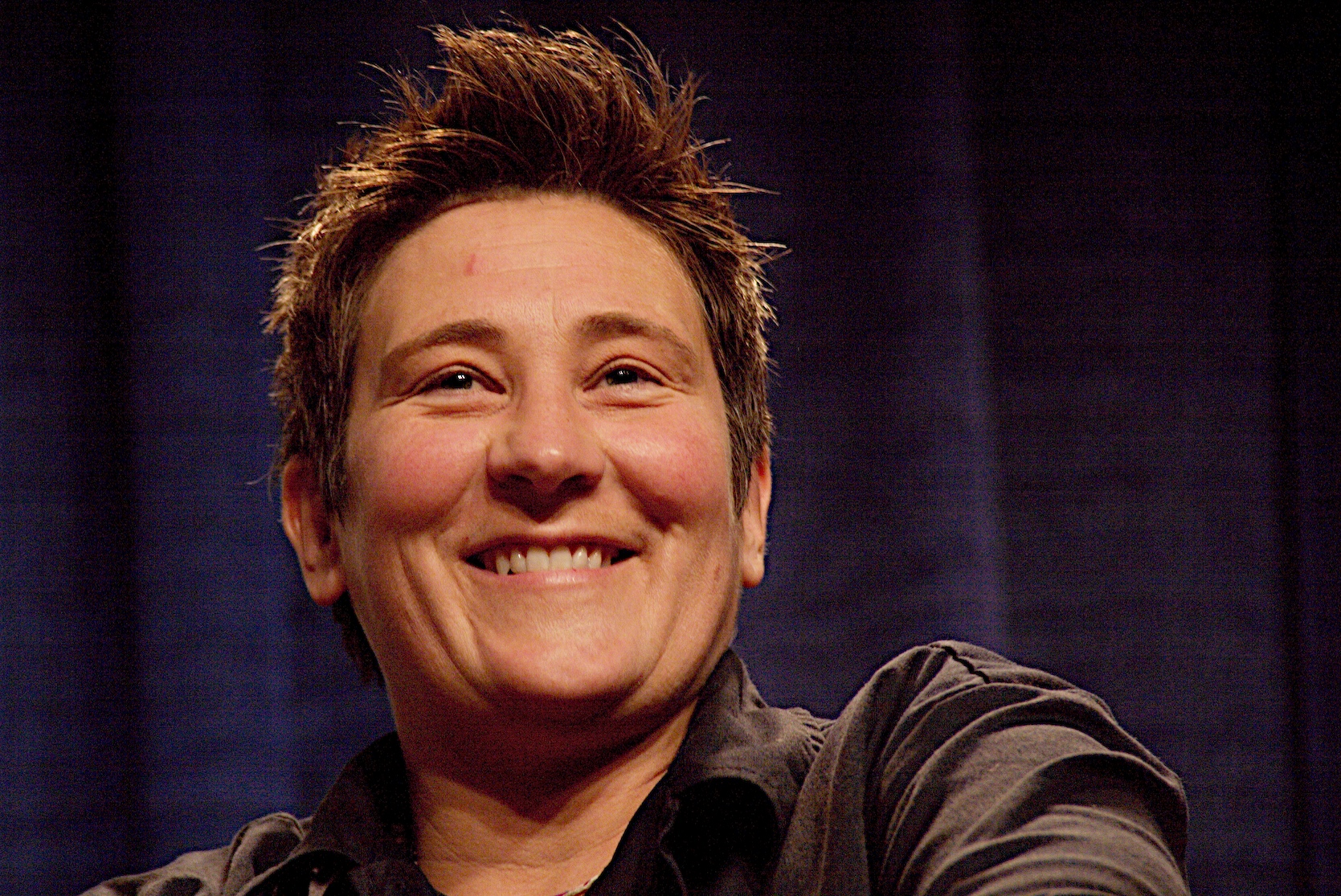
k.d. lang, one of two winners born outside of the United States

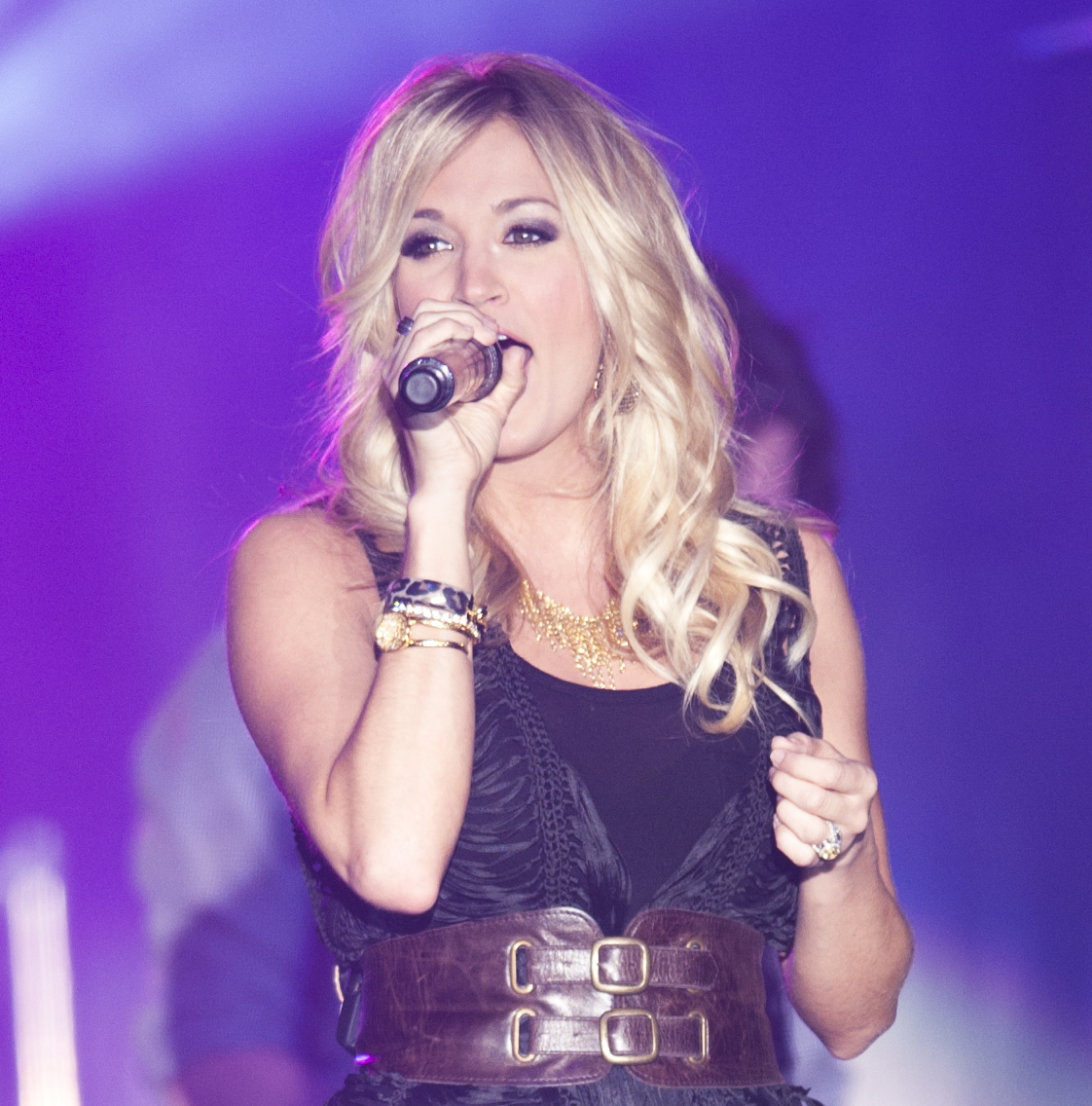
2009 award winner Carrie Underwood collaborated with Randy Travis

Year^{[I]}	Performing artists	Work	Nominees	Ref.
1988	Ronnie Milsap with Kenny Rogers	"Make No Mistake, She's Mine"	Glen Campbell with Emmylou Harris – "You Are"; Glen Campbell with Steve Wariner – "The Hand That Rocks the Cradle"; Crystal Gayle and Gary Morris – "Another World"; Michael Martin Murphey with Holly Dunn – "A Face in the Crowd"	
1989	Roy Orbison and k.d. lang	"Crying"	Earl Thomas Conley with Emmylou Harris – "We Believe in Happy Endings"; Rodney Crowell with Rosanne Cash – "It's Such a Small World"; k.d. lang with Brenda Lee, Loretta Lynn and Kitty Wells (The Honky Tonk Angels) – "Honky Tonk Angels' Medley"; Dwight Yoakam with Buck Owens – "Streets of Bakersfield"	
1990	Hank Williams, Jr. with Hank Williams, Sr.	"There's a Tear in My Beer"	The Nitty Gritty Dirt Band with Roy Acuff, Johnny Cash, Emmylou Harris, Levon Helm and Ricky Skaggs – "Will the Circle Be Unbroken"; The Nitty Gritty Dirt Band with Chris Hillman and Roger McGuinn – "You Ain't Going Nowhere"; Buck Owens with Ringo Starr – "Act Naturally"; Dwight Yoakam with k.d. lang – "Sin City"	
1991	Chet Atkins and Mark Knopfler	"Poor Boy Blues"	Johnny Cash, Waylon Jennings, Kris Kristofferson and Willie Nelson (The Highwaymen) – Highwayman 2; Randy Travis with George Jones – "A Few Ole Country Boys"; Randy Travis with B.B. King – "Waiting on the Light to Change"; Keith Whitley with Lorrie Morgan – "'Til a Tear Becomes a Rose"	
1992	Mark O'Connor with Vince Gill, Ricky Skaggs and Steve Wariner	"Restless"	Earl Thomas Conley with Keith Whitley – "Brotherly Love"; Lee Greenwood with Suzy Bogguss – "Hopelessly Yours"; Dolly Parton with Ricky Van Shelton – "Rockin' Years"; Roy Rogers with Clint Black – "Hold on Partner"	
1993	Travis Tritt featuring Marty Stuart	"The Whiskey Ain't Workin'"	Mary Chapin Carpenter with Joe Diffie – "Not Too Much to Ask"; The Chieftains with the Nitty Gritty Dirt Band – "Killybegs"; Chris LeDoux with Garth Brooks – "Whatcha Gonna Do with a Cowboy"; Tanya Tucker with Delbert McClinton – "Tell Me About It"	
1994	Reba McEntire with Linda Davis	"Does He Love You"	Clint Black with Wynonna – "A Bad Goodbye"; Reba McEntire with Vince Gill – "The Heart Won't Lie"; Dolly Parton with Mary Chapin Carpenter, Billy Ray Cyrus, Kathy Mattea, Pam Tillis and Tanya Tucker - "Romeo"; Ralph Stanley and Dwight Yoakam – "Miner's Prayer"	
1995	Aaron Neville and Trisha Yearwood	"I Fall to Pieces"	Suzy Bogguss, Alison Krauss and Kathy Mattea with Crosby, Stills & Nash – "Teach Your Children"; George Jones and B.B. King – "Patches"; Mark O'Connor with Charlie Daniels featuring Johnny Cash, Marty Stuart and Travis Tritt – "The Devil Comes Back to Georgia"; Dolly Parton, Loretta Lynn and Tammy Wynette – "Silver Threads and Golden Needles"	
1996	Shenandoah with Alison Krauss	"Somewhere in the Vicinity of the Heart"	Suzy Bogguss and Chet Atkins – "All My Loving"; George Jones and Alan Jackson – "A Good Year for the Roses"; Reba McEntire with Linda Davis, Martina McBride and Trisha Yearwood – "On My Own"; Dolly Parton with Vince Gill – "I Will Always Love You"	
1997	Vince Gill featuring Alison Krauss & Union Station	"High Lonesome Sound"	John Berry, Terri Clark, Vince Gill, Faith Hill, Tracy Lawrence, Little Texas, Neal McCoy, Tim McGraw, Lorrie Morgan, Marty Stuart, Travis Tritt and Trisha Yearwood – "Hope: Country Music's Quest for a Cure"; Jeff Foxworthy with Alan Jackson – "Redneck Games"; Lyle Lovett with Randy Newman – "Long Tall Texan"; Marty Stuart with Travis Tritt – "Honky Tonkin's What I Do Best"	
1998	Trisha Yearwood with Garth Brooks	"In Another's Eyes"	Clint Black with Martina McBride – "Still Holding On"; Toby Keith with Sting – "I'm So Happy I Can't Stop Crying"; Patty Loveless with George Jones – "You Don't Seem to Miss Me"; Tim McGraw with Faith Hill – "It's Your Love"	
1999	Clint Black, Joe Diffie, Merle Haggard, Emmylou Harris, Alison Krauss, Patty Loveless, Earl Scruggs, Ricky Skaggs, Marty Stuart, Pam Tillis, Randy Travis, Travis Tritt and Dwight Yoakam	"Same Old Train"	Vince Gill with Patty Loveless – "My Kind of Woman/My Kind of Man"; Faith Hill with Tim McGraw – "Just to Hear You Say That You Love Me"; Reba McEntire with Brooks & Dunn – "If You See Him/If You See Her"; Trisha Yearwood with Garth Brooks – "Where Your Road Leads"	
2000	Emmylou Harris, Linda Ronstadt and Dolly Parton	"After the Gold Rush"	Alabama featuring *NSYNC – "God Must Have Spent A Little More Time on You"; Asleep at the Wheel featuring the Dixie Chicks – "Roly Poly"; Asleep at the Wheel featuring The Manhattan Transfer and Willie Nelson – "Going Away Party"; Clint Black with Lisa Hartman Black – "When I Said I Do"	
2001	Faith Hill with Tim McGraw	"Let's Make Love"	Sheryl Crow featuring Dixie Chicks – "Strong Enough" (Live); The Dixie Chicks and Ricky Skaggs – "Walk Softly"; Vince Gill with Amy Grant – "When I Look Into Your Heart"; George Strait with Alan Jackson – "Murder on Music Row"	
2002	Dan Tyminski, Pat Enright and Harley Allen (The Soggy Bottom Boys)	"I Am a Man of Constant Sorrow"	Emmylou Harris, Alison Krauss and Gillian Welch – "Didn't Leave Nobody But the Baby"; George Jones with Garth Brooks – "Beer Run (B Double E Double Are You In?)"; Jo Dee Messina with Tim McGraw – "Bring on the Rain"; Trisha Yearwood with Don Henley – "Inside Out"	
2003	Willie Nelson with Lee Ann Womack	"Mendocino County Line"	Garth Brooks with Trisha Yearwood – "Squeeze Me In"; Mary Chapin Carpenter, Sheryl Crow and Emmylou Harris – "Flesh and Blood"; Johnny Cash with Fiona Apple – "Bridge over Troubled Water"; The Nitty Gritty Dirt Band featuring Taj Mahal, Alison Krauss and Doc Watson – "Will the Circle Be Unbroken/Glory, Glory"	
2004	James Taylor and Alison Krauss	"How's the World Treating You"	June Carter Cash with Johnny Cash – "Temptation"; Alan Jackson and Jimmy Buffett – "It's Five O'Clock Somewhere"; Toby Keith with Willie Nelson – "Beer for My Horses"; Willie Nelson with Norah Jones – "Wurlitzer Prize (I Don't Want To Get Over You)" (Live)	
2005	Loretta Lynn with Jack White	"Portland Oregon"	Jimmy Buffett with Clint Black, Kenny Chesney, Alan Jackson, Toby Keith and George Strait – "Hey Good Lookin'"; Norah Jones featuring Dolly Parton – "Creepin' In"; Willie Nelson with Merle Haggard and Toby Keith – "Pancho and Lefty" (Live); Shania Twain with Alison Krauss & Union Station – "Coat of Many Colors"	
2006	Faith Hill featuring Tim McGraw	"Like We Never Loved at All"	Brooks & Dunn featuring Sheryl Crow and Vince Gill – "Building Bridges"; Rodney Crowell with Emmylou Harris – "Shelter from the Storm"; Willie Nelson with Norah Jones – "Dreams Come True"; Gretchen Wilson featutring Merle Haggard – "Politically Uncorrect"	
2007	Bon Jovi with Jennifer Nettles of Sugarland	"Who Says You Can't Go Home"	Garth Brooks with Trisha Yearwood – "Love Will Always Win"; Solomon Burke with Dolly Parton – "Tomorrow Is Forever"; Kenny Rogers featuring Don Henley – "Calling Me"; Rhonda Vincent with Bobby Osborne – "Midnight Angel"	
2008	Willie Nelson and Ray Price	"Lost Highway"	Steve Earle with Allison Moorer – "Days Aren't Long Enough"; Reba McEntire and Kelly Clarkson – "Because of You"; Tim McGraw with Faith Hill – "I Need You"; Brad Paisley featuring Carrie Underwood – "Oh Love"	
2009	Robert Plant and Alison Krauss	"Killing the Blues"	Kenny Chesney with George Strait – "Shiftwork"; George Strait with Patty Loveless – "House Of Cash"; Sugarland featuring Little Big Town and Jake Owen – "Life in a Northern Town" (Live); Trisha Yearwood with Keith Urban – "Let the Wind Chase You"	
2010	Carrie Underwood featuring Randy Travis	"I Told You So"	Dierks Bentley featuring Patty Griffin – "Beautiful World"; Kenny Chesney with Mac McAnally – "Down the Road"; Brad Paisley with Keith Urban – "Start a Band"; Lee Ann Womack with George Strait – "Everything But Quits"	
2011	Zac Brown Band featuring Alan Jackson	"As She's Walking Away"	Dierks Bentley featuring Miranda Lambert and Jamey Johnson and – "Bad Angel"; Dierks Bentley with the Punch Brothers featuring Del McCoury – "Pride (In the Name of Love)"; Blake Shelton featuring Trace Adkins – "Hillbilly Bone"; Marty Stuart with Connie Smith – "I Run To You"	

^{^[I]} Each year is linked to the article about the Grammy Awards held that year.

== See also ==
- Grammy Award for Best Country Duo/Group Performance
- Grammy Award for Best Country Performance by a Duo or Group with Vocal
- Grammy Award for Best Country Solo Performance
- Grammy Award for Best Female Country Vocal Performance
- Grammy Award for Best Male Country Vocal Performance
