= The Woman Before Me =

Single by Trisha Yearwood

from the album Trisha Yearwood
- B-side: "You Done Me Wrong (And That Ain't Right)"
- Released: March 23, 1992
- Studio: Sound Emporium (Nashville, Tennessee)
- Genre: Country
- Length: 3:44
- Label: MCA
- Songwriter: Jude Johnstone
- Producer: Garth Fundis

Trisha Yearwood singles chronology
"That's What I Like About You" (1991)	"The Woman Before Me" (1992)	"Wrong Side of Memphis" (1992)

"The Woman Before Me" is a song written by Jude Johnstone and recorded by the American country music artist Trisha Yearwood. It was released in March 1992 as the fourth single from the album Trisha Yearwood. The song reached number 4 on the US Billboard Hot Country Singles & Tracks chart.

== Chart performance ==
Chart (1992)	Peak position
Canada Country Singles (RPM)	12
US Hot Country Songs (Billboard)	4

=== Year-end charts ===
Chart (1992)	Position
US Country Songs (Billboard)	49
