= Like We Never Had a Broken Heart =

Single by Trisha Yearwood

from the album Trisha Yearwood
- B-side: "The Whisper of Your Heart"
- Released: September 9, 1991
- Studio: Sound Emporium (Nashville, Tennessee)
- Genre: Country
- Length: 3:34
- Label: MCA
- Songwriters: Pat Alger, Garth Brooks
- Producer: Garth Fundis

Trisha Yearwood singles chronology
"She's in Love with the Boy" (1991)	"Like We Never Had a Broken Heart" (1991)	"That's What I Like About You" (1991)

"Like We Never Had a Broken Heart" is a song written by Pat Alger and Garth Brooks, and recorded by American country music artist Trisha Yearwood. It was released in September 1991 as the second single from her debut album Trisha Yearwood. The song reached number 4 on the Billboard Hot Country Singles & Tracks chart. In Canada, Garth Brooks received a secondary credit on the song.

== Music video ==
The music video was directed by Marc Ball and premiered in October 1991.

== Chart performance ==
Chart (1991)	Peak position
Canada Country Singles (RPM)	7
US Hot Country Songs (Billboard)	4

=== Year-end charts ===
Chart (1991)	Position
Canada Country Tracks (RPM)	75
