= Trisha Yearwood =

American country singer (born 1964)

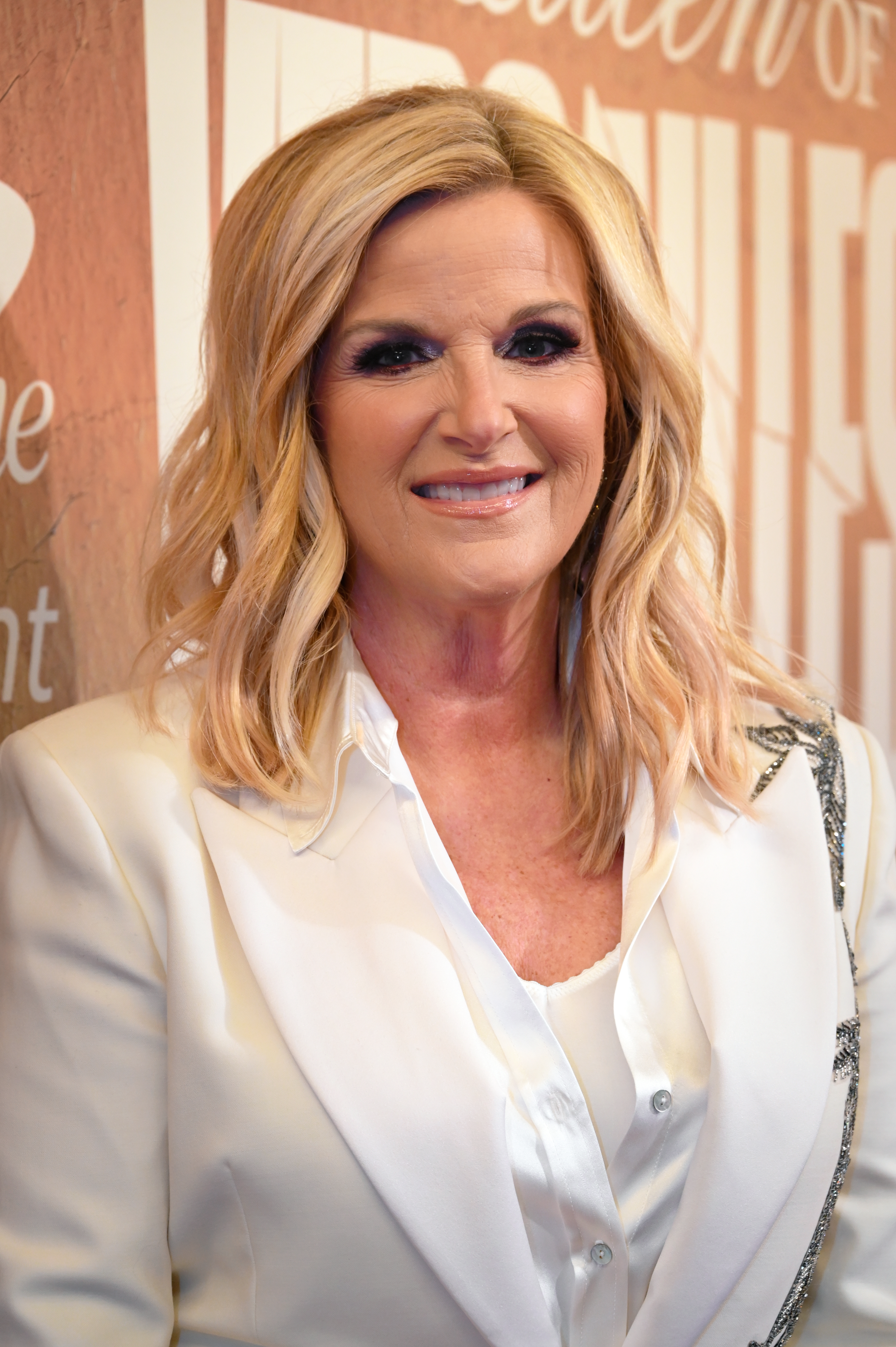
- Yearwood in 2025
- Born: Patricia Lynn Yearwood; September 19, 1964 (age 62); Monticello, Georgia, U.S.
- Education: Young Harris College (AS); Belmont University (BBA)
- Occupations: Singer; actress; television personality; author
- Years active: 1991–present
- Spouses: Christopher Latham (m. 1987; div. 1991) Robert Reynolds (m. 1994; div. 1999) Garth Brooks (m. 2005)
- Awards: List of awards and nominations
- Musical career
- Genres: Country; country pop; adult contemporary
- Instruments: Vocals
- Labels: MCA Nashville; Big Machine; RCA Nashville; Gwendolyn
- Website: trishayearwood.com

Patricia Lynn Yearwood (born September 19, 1964) is an American country singer. She rose to fame with her 1991 debut single "She's in Love with the Boy", which became a number-one hit on the Billboard country singles chart. Its corresponding self-titled debut album sold over two million copies. Yearwood continued with a series of major country hits during the early to mid-1990s, including "The Woman Before Me" (1991), "Walkaway Joe" (1992), "The Song Remembers When" (1993), "XXX's and OOO's (An American Girl)" (1994), and "Believe Me Baby (I Lied)" (1996).

Yearwood's 1997 single "How Do I Live" reached number two on the U.S. country singles chart and was internationally successful. It appeared on her first compilation (Songbook) A Collection of Hits (1997). The album certified quadruple-platinum in the United States and featured the hits "In Another's Eyes" and "Perfect Love". Yearwood had a string of commercial successes over the next several years including the hit singles "There Goes My Baby" and "I Would've Loved You Anyway". She released her 10th studio record Jasper County in 2005, which debuted at number one on the Billboard Top Country Albums chart and the top 10 of the Billboard 200. It became her fastest-selling album in the United States. Yearwood signed with Big Machine Records in 2007 and released the critically acclaimed Heaven, Heartache and the Power of Love the same year.

Yearwood spent several years on hiatus from her own musical career to focus on other projects. She published three successful cookbooks, which appeared on The New York Times Best Seller list. In 2012, she began a culinary television series on the Food Network called Trisha's Southern Kitchen, which later won a Daytime Emmy Award. Yearwood has sold over 15 million records worldwide. Her work has earned her several awards and nominations, including three Grammy Awards, three awards from the Academy of Country Music, and three awards from the Country Music Association. Yearwood has also been a cast member of the Grand Ole Opry since 1999. Since 2005, she has been married to country singer Garth Brooks, with whom she has collaborated on a number of occasions.

== Early life ==
Yearwood was born in Monticello, Georgia, the daughter of schoolteacher Gwendolyn Yearwood and local banker Jack Howard Yearwood. Trisha Yearwood's ancestors came to North America from England during the colonial era. From an early age, she was passionate about music and participated in various music events held by her school and community. This included talent shows, church events, and musicals. After graduating from high school at Piedmont Academy in Monticello, class of 1982, Yearwood studied for two years at Young Harris College, receiving an associate degree in business. She then attended the University of Georgia for one semester before dropping out. Yearwood then moved to Nashville, Tennessee, in 1985, enrolling in Belmont College and pursued a music business degree.

Yearwood gained an internship with MTM Records and was eventually hired as a full-time employee. With the help of the record label's resources, she recorded a series of demonstration tapes and also sang background vocals for new artists. One of the artists she recorded with was Garth Brooks. Developing a friendship, Brooks promised to help Yearwood sign a recording contract if his career succeeded. Brooks brought her to his producer, Allen Reynolds, who then brought her to the attention of producer Garth Fundis. Fundis and Yearwood began collaborating and eventually crafted a demo tape. In 1990, she sang background vocals on Brooks' second album, No Fences, and performed live at a label showcase. MCA Records producer Tony Brown heard her performance and was impressed. Brown helped her sign a recording contract with the label. After signing with the label, she served as the opening act on Brooks' 1991 nationwide tour.

== Music career ==
=== 1991: Breakthrough ===
Yearwood's self-titled debut album was released in 1991. Its lead single, "She's in Love with the Boy", peaked at number one on the US country songs chart, bringing her major success. Three other singles from the album reached the top ten on the US country chart — "Like We Never Had a Broken Heart", "The Woman Before Me", and "That's What I Like About You". Her debut album eventually sold one million copies and was certified double platinum by the RIAA for shipments of two million copies. Yearwood also became the first female country artist to sell a million copies of her debut album. AllMusic reviewed the album and called the effort "a very classy debut that stands the test of time," giving it four and a half out of five stars. Additionally, Entertainment Weekly, said that Yearwood's voice "demonstrates technical and emotional authority at every turn." Yearwood's success garnered her a series of major music awards. In 1991, she was named Top New Female Vocalist by the Academy of Country Music and was voted Favorite New Country Artist by the American Music Awards in 1992.

With success, Yearwood began engaging in more opportunities. Parting ways with her previous management firm, she began working under the supervision of Ken Kragen, who oversaw Kenny Rogers and Travis Tritt. She also became the spokesperson for the WildHeart fragrance by Revlon. In a 2010 interview with Good Housekeeping, Yearwood explained that while filming the fragrance's commercial, she was asked to embrace with a male model. She declined to do so and would not continue production until her manager arrived to support her decision. The commercial was eventually filmed and shown on major television networks.

=== 1992–1996: Career diversification ===
In 1992, Yearwood released her second studio album, Hearts in Armor. With this album, she chose songs that came from emotional conflicts following the divorce from first husband, Chris Latham. The album was a departure from her previous material, containing ballads and collaborations with Don Henley, Emmylou Harris, and Raul Malo. Music critics praised the album. Allmusic called the album "stunning" and "one of the best heartbreak records country music delivered in the '80s and '90s." About.com gave it five stars and called Hearts in Armor "possibly Trisha's best album ever." The album's first two singles reached the top 10 of the US country chart in 1992 — "Wrong Side of Memphis" and "Walkaway Joe", the latter featuring Henley on backing vocals. The remaining singles ("You Say You Will" and "Down on My Knees") peaked within the top 20 of the country songs chart. Hearts in Armor later certified platinum in sales from the RIAA.

I've had to say to myself, well, if I passed Emmylou Harris on the street, would I be able to hold my head up?

— Yearwood on her musical direction in the 1990s

Yearwood released her third album in 1993 titled The Song Remembers When. The title track reached number two on the US country chart that year. The record was recorded in a similar musical style to Hearts in Armor, differing with more contemporary arrangements. The album also included collaborations with other artists such as Rodney Crowell and Willie Nelson. The album was later accompanied by a cable television special in 1993, from where the title track's music video derived. Yearwood followed the studio album with her first holiday compilation in 1994, titled The Sweetest Gift. It included cover versions of holiday standards, such as "Away in a Manger", "Let It Snow! Let It Snow! Let It Snow!", and "The Christmas Song".

In February 1995, Yearwood released her fourth studio album, Thinkin' About You, which was geared more towards adult contemporary styles. The album was given a positive review by Rolling Stone, which compared Thinkin' About You to many of Linda Ronstadt's albums in the 1970s. The disc included a version of Melissa Etheridge's "You Can Sleep While I Drive" and Tammy Wynette's "'Til I Get It Right". Thinkin' About You's first two singles reached the top on the US country chart: "XXX's and OOO's (An American Girl)" and the title track. Its third single, "I Wanna Go Too Far", reached the top 10 after its release at the end of 1995. Like its predecessors, Thinkin' About You eventually sold one million copies in the United States and was certified platinum from the RIAA. At the 1995 Grammy Awards, Yearwood's duet with Aaron Neville titled "I Fall to Pieces" (a cover of the 1961 song by Patsy Cline) won in the category of Best Country Collaboration with Vocals. The award became Yearwood's first accolade from the Grammys.

In August 1996, she released her fifth studio album, Everybody Knows, which had similarities to her previous album. The record mostly contained ballads and the songs featured larger melodies. Everybody Knows received mixed reviews by critics. AllMusic gave the album three out of five stars, calling the songs "a little uneven". However, Entertainment Weekly praised the album, calling the title track an "emotional release of a pounding piano". Everybody Knows spawned the "Believe Me Baby (I Lied)", which became Yearwood's fourth number-one single on the US country chart. The title track was released as the second single and peaked within the US country top five in 1996. During this period, Yearwood performed at the closing ceremony of the 1996 Summer Olympics, which were held in Atlanta, Georgia.

=== 1997–2001: Crossover success ===
Yearwood released her first greatest-hits compilation in August 1997, (Songbook) A Collection of Hits. Songbook was praised by most music critics, including AllMusic, who called it "a near-definitive collection". The compilation became her first album to peak at number one on the US country albums chart. It also reached the top 10 of the Billboard 200, peaking at number four. Songbook included three new tracks that were eventually released as singles. "How Do I Live", the first single issued, was included in the 1997 film Con Air. The song was also nominated for Best Song at the Academy Awards. "How Do I Live" was originally recorded by LeAnn Rimes for the film. Rimes's version became a major hit on the US Hot 100, peaking at number two, while Yearwood's version peaked at number two on the US country chart. The song also reached number 23 on the Hot 100. The album's second single, "In Another's Eyes" (a duet with Garth Brooks), reached number two on the country chart, while its third single, "Perfect Love", reached number one in early 1998. Additionally, Yearwood won a series of accolades. This included ones from the Grammy Awards, the Country Music Association Awards, and the Academy of Country Music. Songbook would become Yearwood's highest-selling album, selling four million copies in the United States, eventually being certified quadruple platinum from the RIAA.

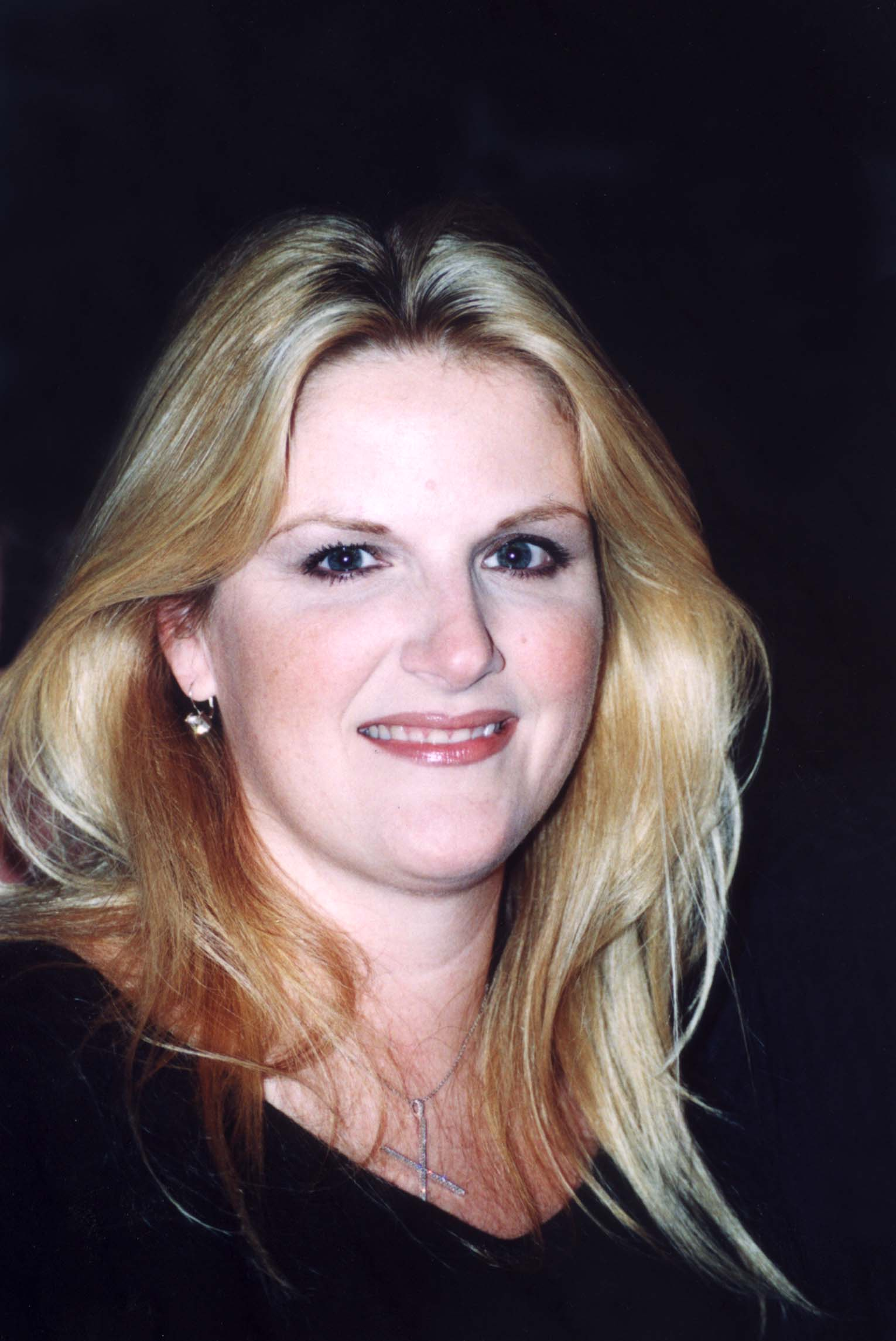
Yearwood at an event in Washington, DC, 2002

Yearwood issued first studio album two years later, Where Your Road Leads (1998). It was her first album produced by Tony Brown, with her five previous albums being produced by Garth Fundis. The singles, "There Goes My Baby", "Powerful Thing", and "I'll Still Love You More" became top-10 hits on the US country chart. The title track, was another collaboration with Garth Brooks and became a top-20 hit single. The album gained mostly positive reviews. About.com reviewed the album and gave it four stars, calling it "one of her best albums". It was also reviewed by Allmusic, which also gave the release four out of five stars. During this time, Yearwood engaged in additional ventures. In the summer of 1998, she performed with singer Luciano Pavarotti to benefit Liberian children. In 1999, she was inducted as a member of the Grand Ole Opry by Porter Wagoner, and is still a member to date.

Following a second divorce, Yearwood released her seventh studio album in March 2000, titled Real Live Woman. In similarity to Hearts in Armor, the record reflected emotional conflicts following the separation. The album contained 12 tracks and included covers of Bruce Springsteen's "Sad Eyes" and Linda Ronstadt's "Try Me Again". It was given critical acclaim from AllMusic, quoting Real Live Woman as a "measured, deliberate record in the best possible sense." The album sold 500,000 copies in the United States and spawned two singles: the title track and "Where Are You Now".

In 2001, Yearwood released her eighth studio record, Inside Out, produced by Mark Wright. The album included collaborations from Don Henley on the title track, Rosanne Cash, and Vince Gill. AllMusic called the release "bound to inspire fans and fellow artists alike", calling Yearwood's voice "timeless". Rolling Stone gave the album four out of five stars calling, "Love Alone" and "Melancholy Blue" the best songs on the record. The album spawned the top five US country single, "I Would've Loved You Anyway".

=== 2002–2016: Jasper County, record label switch and new career directions ===
Following her 2001 album, Yearwood spent time with family and eventually established a romantic relationship with Garth Brooks. In September 2005, she released her first album of new recordings in four years, Jasper County. The album reunited her with Fundis on production duties, and took its name from Jasper County, Georgia, where she was raised. The album consisted of mostly upbeat soul-styled songs. It received positive reviews by critics, including AllMusic writer Stephen Thomas Erlewine, who called it "an album that stretches further musically than most of her albums while being more cohesive than most of her records as well." It received five stars from About.com, praising the songs "Georgia Rain", "Who Invented the Wheel", and "Standing Out in a Crowd". The album became her third to reach number one on the Billboard Top Country Albums chart. It also peaked at number four on the Billboard 200, selling 117,000 copies within its first week. Its first-week sales eclipsed those of Paul McCartney's Chaos and Creation in the Backyard (released within the same week). The first single, "Georgia Rain", peaked at number 15 on the US country chart. The second single, "Trying to Love You" was released to radio October 31, reaching number 52. Within a month of the album's release, Jasper County certified gold from the RIAA, becoming Yearwood's eleventh Gold certification of her career.

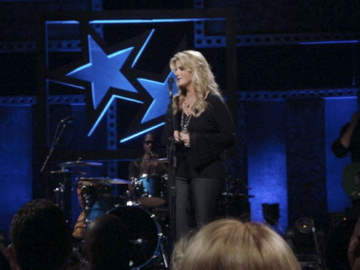
Yearwood performing on Country Music Television, 2007

In May 2007, Yearwood announced her departure from MCA Nashville Records and her signing with the independent label Big Machine Records. Yearwood and the label's CEO, Scott Borchetta- met when she originally worked for MTM Records in the late 1980s. She then worked with Borchetta at MCA during the 1990s. Following her separation, MCA released a Greatest Hits compilation, which included her major hits between 1991 and 2001.

After signing with the label, Yearwood announced plans for the recording of her 10th studio album. In November 2007, Big Machine released Heaven, Heartache, and the Power of Love. The album peaked at number 10 on the US country chart and reached number 30 on the Billboard 200. AllMusic gave the project four and a half out of five stars, calling it their "album pick" in her discography. Slant Magazine also reviewed the record, giving it four and a half stars, calling it "a testament to the vitality, intelligence, and soulfulness of modern country's best music." The title track was released as the first single in July 2007, peaking at number 19 on the US country songs chart. The second single, "This Is Me You're Talking To" was released in January 2008. The song received critical acclaim, notably from Engine 145, which called it "one of the best singles of the year".

After beginning a successful Food Network cooking show and several cookbooks, Yearwood went into hiatus from her solo music career. Although she did not focus on solo projects, she remained active in the music industry. From 2009 to 2014, Yearwood accompanied husband Garth Brooks in his concert residency called Garth at Wynn, located at the Encore Theatre in Las Vegas. The Las Vegas production ran for three years, closing in 2014. In 2014, Yearwood joined Brooks on his three-year world tour entitled The Garth Brooks World Tour. During this time, she briefly embarked on her own brief tour called "Just Because". In August 2014, Yearwood signed with RCA Records Nashville, which released the album, PrizeFighter: Hit After Hit. It contained 16 of her major hits re-recorded for the album and several new songs. The title track was released as the lead single and featured guest vocals from Kelly Clarkson. The album debuted at number seven on the US country chart.

In 2016, Yearwood appeared in the live television musical The Passion. As a result, she was also featured on the event's soundtrack, performing new versions of several well-known songs, including; "Hands", "My Love Is Your Love", "You'll Never Walk Alone", and "Broken". "Broken" became Yearwood's first hit on the Christian charts, peaking at number 47 and also reaching number 17 on the US Adult Contemporary chart. In late 2016, she joined Garth Brooks on their first collaborative studio album titled Christmas Together. The album featured covers of classic holiday songs and an original track written by the pair called "What I'm Thankful for (The Thanksgiving Song)". Following this, Yearwood was selected as one of 30 artists to perform on the song "Forever Country". The song was created to celebrate 50 years of the CMA Awards.

=== 2018–present: Return to music ===
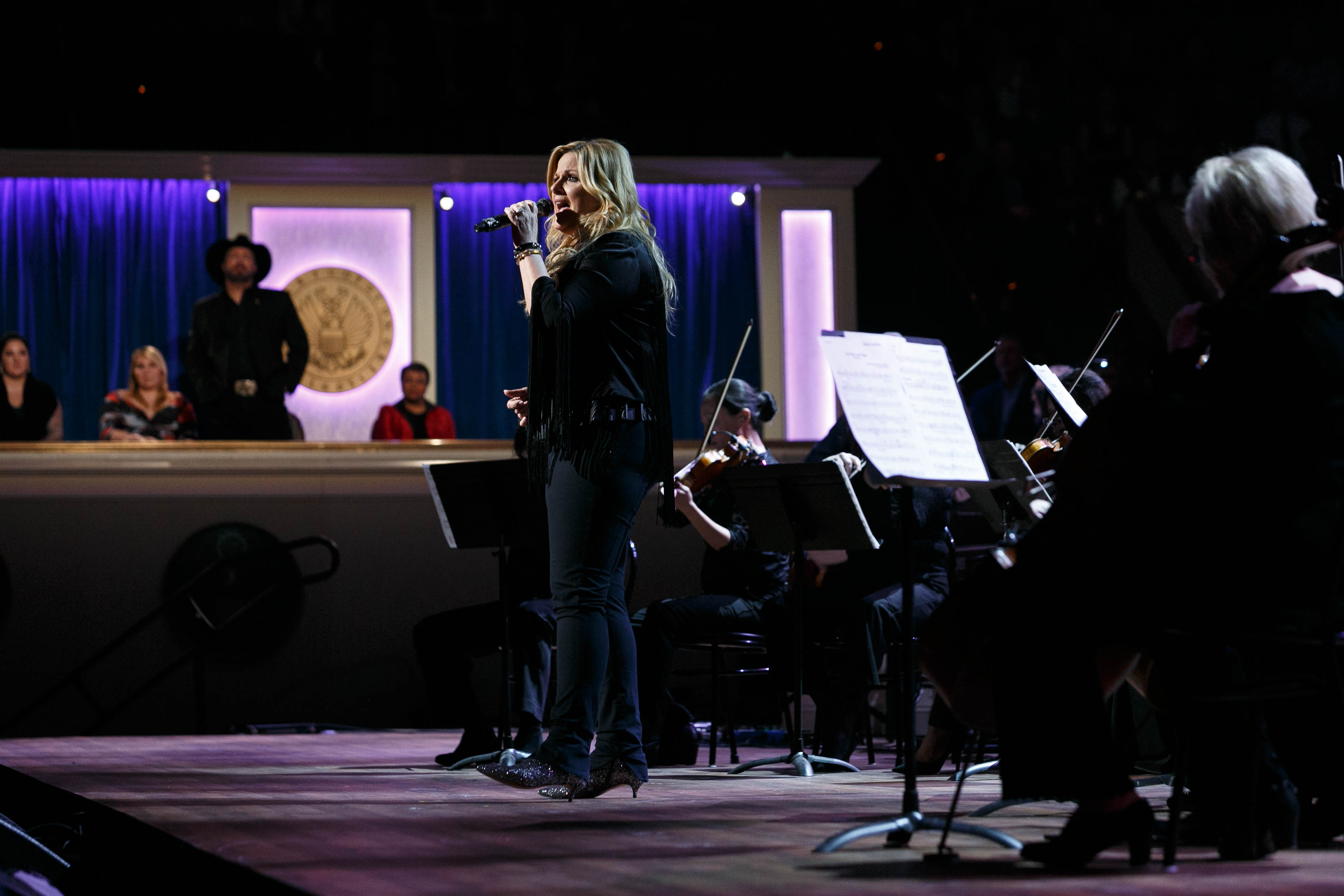
Yearwood at the Library of Congress, March 2020.

In late 2018, Yearwood announced the release of a new album consisting of songs previously recorded by Frank Sinatra. Titled Let's Be Frank, it was recorded live at the Capitol Records building, and was backed by a full orchestra. Yearwood used Sinatra's original microphone during the recording process. It was released in December 2018, exclusively at Williams Sonoma stores, and worldwide on February 14, 2019. The album peaked at number 2 on the Billboard Jazz Albums chart. In his review, Kevin John Coyne of Country Universe praised the release, giving it four of five possible stars.

Yearwood then announced plans for her 12th studio album, titled Every Girl, her first album of original material in over 12 years. Its lead single, "Every Girl in This Town", was released in June 2019 and debuted at number 21 on the US Country Airplay chart, marking the highest chart debut of her career. Every Girl was released in August 2019 and featured collaborations with Garth Brooks, Kelly Clarkson, and Don Henley. The album peaked at number five on the US country chart and number 57 on the Billboard 200. Every Girl received critical praise upon its release. Allmusic's Thom Jurek gave the album four of five stars, calling it "more commanding and more emotionally resonant than in years past." Roughstock's Matt Bjorke commented, "Trisha Yearwood has chosen 14 diverse songs, which showcase her pristine voice, an instrument as strong today as it has ever been, if not more powerful." Yearwood embarked on her first solo tour in six years to support the album, which launched in October 2019. To celebrate the 30th anniversary of her career, Yearwood released a deluxe edition of Every Girl in August 2021. This contained an acoustic version of her debut single "She's in Love with the Boy", along with new songs "I Dare You to Love" and "Shallow", a duet with Garth Brooks.

Following an induction to the Hollywood Walk of Fame, her 16th studio album was issued in July 2025 titled, The Mirror. Consisting of self-composed songs, it was inspired by a newfound confidence to her write her own material. It received a five-star review from AllMusic's Thom Jurek, who called it "a masterpiece" and also wrote that it had "musical maturity" that "seamlessly juxtaposes radio-friendly contemporary country". Adam Tamburin of Axios concluded that its "new songs hold their own alongside the classics from the rest of her 34-year career." The Mirror made the top 40 of the US country albums and independent albums charts. Her second solo collection of Christmas music was released in November 2025 titled Christmastime. The project featured production from Don Was and consisted of Christmas standards. A twelve-day holiday tour is set to follow the album's release in December 2025.

== Other career ventures ==
=== Cooking ===
In April 2008, Yearwood released her first cookbook co-written with her mother Gwen and sister Beth, Georgia Cooking in an Oklahoma Kitchen. The cookbook included other recipes passed down from her family and liner notes describing each recipe. In total, 120 recipes were included. The book contained recipes for such foods as fried chicken, ribs, meatloaf, and cheesecake. Garth Brooks wrote the book's foreword, stating how he was always fond of her cooking style. Georgia Cooking reached number one on the New York Times Best Seller list. Yearwood then stated plans to publish a second cookbook.

On April 6, 2010, she collaborated again with her mother and sister to release Home Cooking with Trisha Yearwood. The book contained recipes passed down through her mother, aunts, cousins, and longtime friends. Yearwood stated that she dedicated many of the cookbook's recipes to relatives, such as Brooks, who also provided the foreword. Home Cooking also reached number one on The New York Times Best Seller list. Yearwood's cookbook was the cover article for the April 2010 issue of Redbook Magazine, where she explained that many of the recipes featured in the cookbook were "some of the best memories of her childhood". Later that year, the Physicians Committee for Responsible Medicine included Home Cooking with Trisha Yearwood on their list of "The Five Worst Cookbooks of 2010", noting its recipes are "loaded with fat and cholesterol", specifically citing one called "Garth's Breakfast Bowl", which "includes eight large eggs, a pound each of bacon and sausage, cheese tortellini, cheddar cheese, tater tots, and B.O.B (Bowl Of Butter)." In 2015, Yearwood released her third cooking writing endeavor called Trisha's Table. Garth Brooks wrote the book's foreword and it was another writing collaboration with her sister.

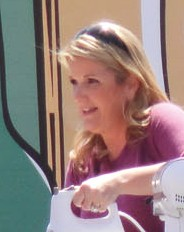
Yearwood at the Los Angeles Times Festival cooking, 2010

In 2012, Yearwood announced plans to film a cooking show. Trisha's Southern Kitchen premiered on the Food Network on April 14, 2012. The original six episodes were filmed in Nashville. The show received a positive response from viewers. According to Food Network's senior vice president: "Our viewers loved seeing a different side of Trisha. Her impressive cooking skills and family recipes, coupled with her natural southern charm, really resonated with our audience...We're thrilled Trisha will be returning for a second season with more delicious dishes and family traditions." In 2013, Trisha's Southern Kitchen won an Emmy award for "Outstanding Culinary Program". The show has since been nominated for additional Emmy accolades. In a 2017 interview, Yearwood stated that she would like to continue hosting the program for "as long as she can."

=== Film and television ===
In 1997, Yearwood began playing a recurring role on the CBS military drama JAG, where she played Lieutenant Commander Teresa Coulter, a Navy coroner and forensic specialist, who develops feelings for one of the main characters. She appeared on the show at various times until 2002. In the 1999 film Stuart Little, Yearwood performed the song "You're Where I Belong", written by Diane Warren and produced by Keith Thomas. In addition, Yearwood also guest-starred in the television series Dr. Quinn, Medicine Woman in 1994 as a choir director. Yearwood has also stated she is interested in performing in a Broadway musical, but not "anytime soon". She appeared in an episode of TLC's Who Do You Think You Are? on September 3, 2013.

In March 2016, Yearwood appeared as Mary in the live television musical The Passion based on the Dutch franchise of the same name. The show is a contemporary retelling of the Passion of Jesus Christ set to popular music with a mixture of live and recorded segments. The event was broadcast live on Fox. The show received mixed reviews. In one interview by Robert Bianco of USA Today, "Yearwood's Mary may have been singing about Jesus, but she never interacted with him. While he was mostly seen in segments shot around the city, she sang to the crowd gathered in front of that big white stage, belting out 'You'll Never Walk Alone' to no one in particular." A review by Entertainment Weekly called Yearwood's performance of the songs she performed "expressive", but lacking the live elements, as it was filmed through recorded scenes. In 2019, Yearwood hosted the 10th annual CMA Country Christmas. The special was taped in September 2019 and featured performances by various artists, including Tori Kelly, CeCe Winans, and Brett Young.

== Artistry ==
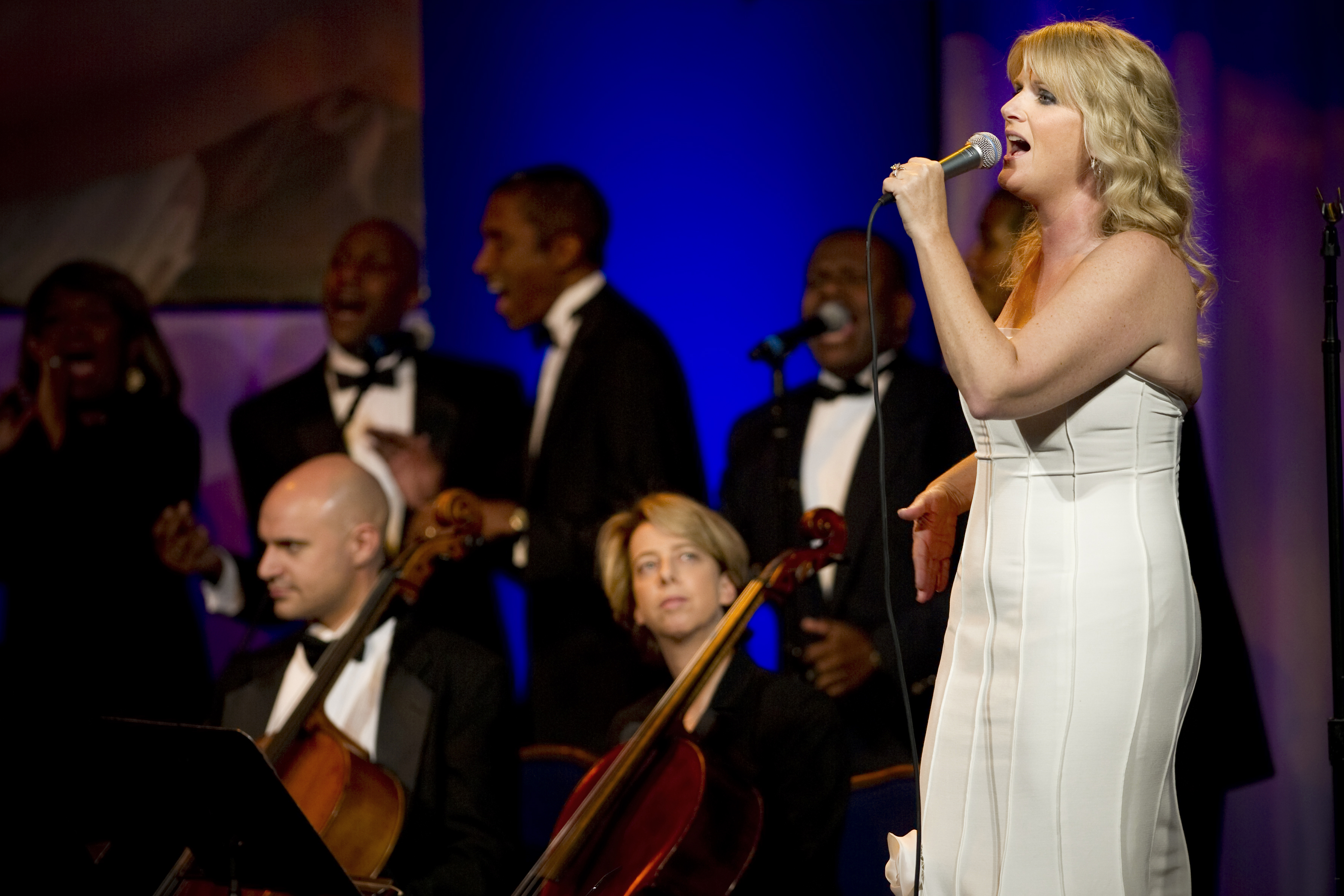
Yearwood performing in 2010

Yearwood possesses an alto vocal range. Yearwood has stated she particularly enjoys singing harmonies, expounding, "Because I could read music, I was always the one in the school chorus who got the alto part because I could read. I'm never singing the melody and always singing the harmony in church." Her musical tastes originated from classic artists her parents listened to. This included Elvis Presley, Patsy Cline, Loretta Lynn, and Tammy Wynette. However, as Yearwood developed into her teenage years, she developed a liking for country rock artists such as Allman Brothers and James Taylor. She also cited the Eagles and Gordon Lightfoot as influences.

According to Yearwood, her primary musical influence is Linda Ronstadt. She discovered her music after her parents bought her Ronstadt's studio album Simple Dreams. Yearwood commented to The Wall Street Journal that while Ronstadt's music was considered pop, her phrasing and emotional style appeared country. Music critics and writers have drawn similarities between Ronstadt and Yearwood's voice. In an interview for Ronstadt's album Feels Like Home, Peter Galvin of Rolling Stone commented, "Listening to Yearwood's new album, Thinkin' About You, you would sometimes swear you were hearing Ronstadt circa 1976. Yearwood's voice is thinner and more pliable than Ronstadt's, but both resort to a hearty squawk when passion takes them over, and both possess low honey tones." She also reported to be influenced by Emmylou Harris.

Yearwood's musical style has been considered "country pop" and "adult contemporary". Additionally, her artistic choices have been considered unique from writers because of song choice and quality. When ranking her "top 10" songs, staff from The Boot magazine explained her musical quality, "Yearwood has carved out a very successful and unique niche for herself by finding some of the highest-quality songs in the genre, then recording them in arrangements that bring them to life in a way that is sonically different from any other artist in the commercial country marketplace." Laura McClellan of Taste of Country explained that it is Yearwood's diverse musical styles that make her music quality and career successful. McClellan also noted, "Her songs have shaped country music — particularly for female artists — for decades."

== Philanthropy ==
Yearwood has participated in various philanthropic events. She recorded a version of "My Favorite Things" for the Sears "Heroes at Home" program in 2008. The song was available for download via the Sears website. The project supported the families of service men and women during the Christmas holiday season.

Yearwood has been an active member of the charity home building group Habitat for Humanity, a venture she first joined with husband Garth Brooks in 2006. They assisted in the Hurricane Katrina disaster relief by building flood walls in New Orleans and protective structures in Mississippi. Between May 2 to 10, 2009, Yearwood participated in "National Women Build Week" near her home in Tulsa, Oklahoma. This project saw two hundred crews of women learn to build houses in Atlanta, Georgia and Oklahoma. For the project, Yearwood learned to construct and build simple and affordable houses for Habitat for Humanity construction sites nationwide. On Mother's Day, Yearwood, her sister, mother and niece joined the project as well. Many of these Habitat for Humanity projects have been collaborations with former president Jimmy Carter and his wife Rosalynn Carter. On January 9, 2025, Yearwood along with Brooks performed the John Lennon song Imagine at the funeral for Former President Jimmy Carter at the Washington National Cathedral in Washington, D.C., a tribute they had previously performed at Rosalynn's funeral two years prior.

During the COVID-19 pandemic, Yearwood and her husband Garth Brooks performed an informal concert broadcast on Facebook Live. The website crashed multiple times as an estimated 5.2 million streamed the broadcast. As a result of this, Brooks and Yearwood performed a concert in the same format the following week, broadcast live on CBS, along with a donation of $1 million to relief efforts. The CBS special scored an estimated 5.6 million viewers.

Reminding Georgians that their vote matters, Yearwood encouraged voters in the state to participate in the December 6, 2020, runoff election between GOP nominee Herschel Walker and Senator Raphael Warnock, directing voters to non-partisan voter advocate organization VoteRiders for information and assistance with voter ID requirements.

== Personal life ==
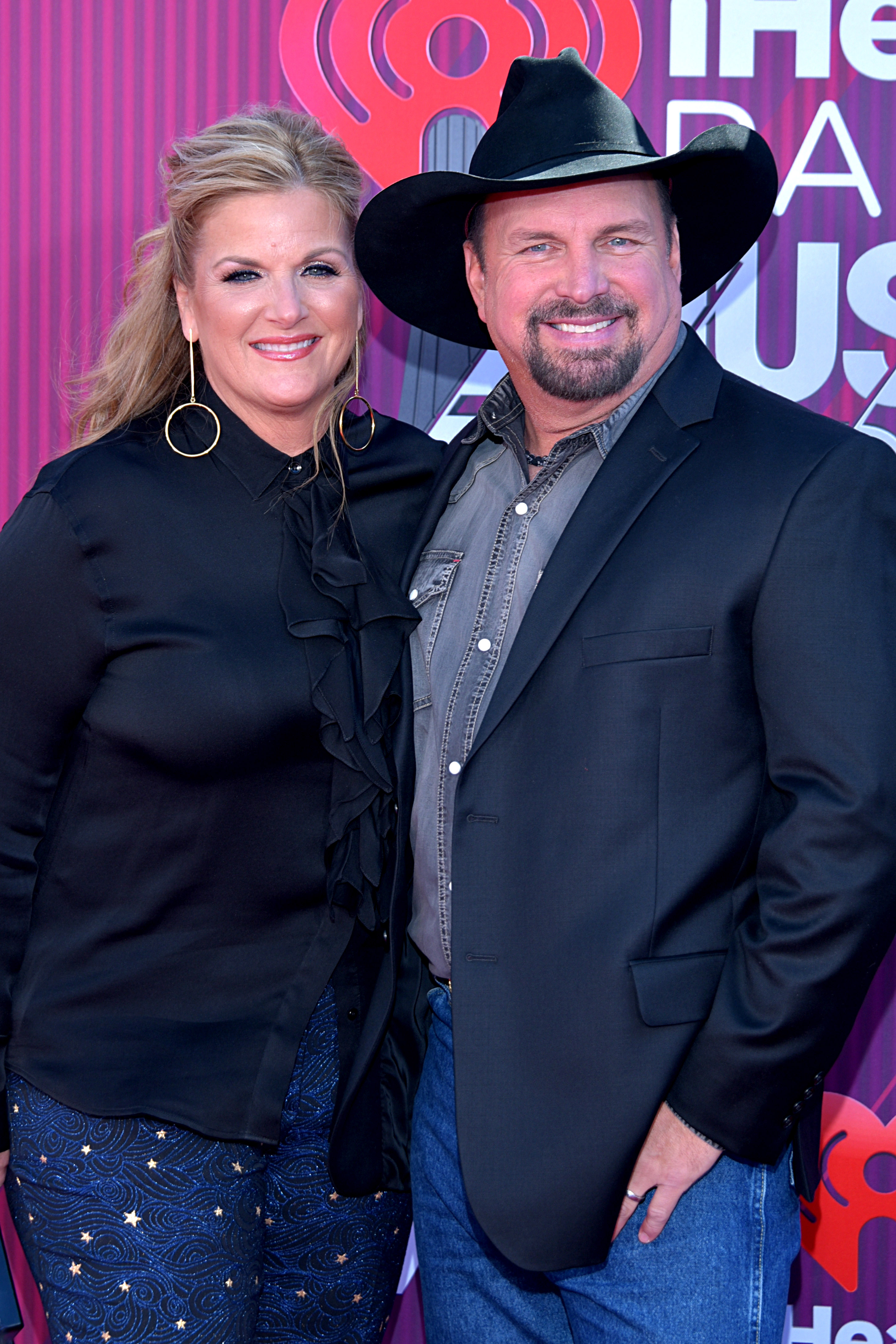
Garth Brooks and Yearwood at the 2019 iHeartRadio Music Awards.

Yearwood married her first husband, Chris Latham, in 1987. The pair divorced in 1991. In 1994, she married Robert Reynolds, founding bassist for The Mavericks. During their marriage, the couple lived in a log cabin-styled home in Hendersonville, Tennessee. The pair divorced in 1999 after five years of marriage. Yearwood commented that the separation was "difficult" in a 1999 interview with Country Weekly, "Since I do hang on to the past with my fingernails, divorce was difficult...It's a serious decision involving someone you're tied to emotionally, so it's hard to move on. And it's easy to drag things out so you don't have to face people talking about you."

Yearwood and Garth Brooks had been friends and musical partners before romantically seeing each other. According to Brooks, his first encounter with Yearwood felt like "that feeling when you just meet your wife". During this period, Yearwood and Brooks were both married to other people. For these reasons, they remained friends during the first half of their careers. Following Brooks's divorce and Yearwood's second divorce, the two began dating around 2000. They became engaged in 2005 when Brooks proposed to Yearwood onstage amidst a crowd of 7,000 in Bakersfield, California. The pair married on December 10, 2005. The wedding took place at the couple's home in Owasso, Oklahoma. Brooks's three children were also part of the wedding ceremony.

According to Yearwood, the pair made a commitment not to spend time apart. It is estimated by Yearwood that the couple spends about five days away from each other per year. In an interview with People Magazine she explained this further, "We really have made a conscious effort since getting married to not be apart, so we've toured together. If I'm doing something, he'll be with me, even if you don't see him, he'll be in the hotel or around...And we're not always together, but we've been married before, and we decided we don't want to be apart. So [we said] let's make an effort to make sure that's our priority and we've been able to do it." She became a stepmother to Brooks's three children following their marriage. In a 2017 interview, Yearwood explained her new role, "I had no idea what I was doing. I have to say that now as these girls have grown—they're adults now on their own—it's been a part of my life that I would have never even known to dream about, and it's been so rewarding to get to be a part of this family."

== Discography ==
Studio albums

- Trisha Yearwood (1991)
- Hearts in Armor (1992)
- The Song Remembers When (1993)
- The Sweetest Gift (1994)
- Thinkin' About You (1995)
- Everybody Knows (1996)
- Where Your Road Leads (1998)
- Real Live Woman (2000)
- Inside Out (2001)
- Jasper County (2005)
- Heaven, Heartache and the Power of Love (2007)
- PrizeFighter: Hit After Hit (2014)
- Christmas Together (with Garth Brooks) (2016)
- Let's Be Frank (2018)
- Every Girl (2019)
- The Mirror (2025)
- Christmastime (2025)

== Filmography ==
Title	Year	Role	Notes
Hee Haw	1992	Musical guest	National television debut
The Thing Called Love	1993	Herself	Cameo
Dr. Quinn, Medicine Woman	1994	Choir director	Episode: "A First Christmas"
Ellen	1996	Herself	Episode: "Not So Great Expectations"
JAG	1997–2002	Lt. Cmdr. Teresa Coulter	6 episodes: "The Return of Jimmy Blackhorse", "Nobody's Child", "Shakedown", "Body Talk", "Past Tense", "In Country"
The Tangerine Bear: Home in Time for Christmas!	2000	Narrator	Voice
Trisha's Southern Kitchen	2012–2022	Herself/Host	231 episodes Winner - Daytime Emmy Award for Outstanding Culinary Program (2013)
Who Do You Think You Are?	2013	Herself	
Kelly Clarkson's Cautionary Christmas Music Tale	2013	Musical guest	
Nashville	2014	Herself	Cameo
The Passion	2016	Mary	
CMA Country Christmas	2019	Host	Special
Spinal Tap II: The End Continues	2025	Herself	Cameo

== Awards ==
Yearwood has received many awards and nominations. This includes 3 Grammy Awards, 3 Academy of Country Music awards, 3 Country Music Association awards, and 1 Daytime Emmy award.

== Books ==
- Georgia Cooking in an Oklahoma Kitchen (2008)
- Home Cooking with Trisha Yearwood (2010)
- Trisha's Table (2015)
- Trisha's Kitchen (2021)
