= In Another's Eyes =

Single by Trisha Yearwood with Garth Brooks

from the album (Songbook) A Collection of Hits & Sevens
- B-side: "I Want to Live Again"
- Released: August 18, 1997
- Recorded: 1997
- Studio: Jack's Tracks (Nashville, Tennessee)
- Genre: Country
- Length: 3:32
- Label: MCA Nashville
- Songwriters: Garth Brooks, Bobby Wood, John Peppard
- Producer: Allen Reynolds

Trisha Yearwood singles chronology
"How Do I Live" (1997)	"In Another's Eyes" (1997)	"Perfect Love" (1998)

Garth Brooks singles chronology
"That Ol' Wind" (1996)	"In Another's Eyes" (1997)	"Longneck Bottle" (1997)

"In Another's Eyes" is a song recorded by American country music artists Trisha Yearwood and Garth Brooks. It was released in August 1997 as the second single from Yearwood's compilation album (Songbook) A Collection of Hits. The song reached number 2 on the Billboard Hot Country Singles & Tracks chart. Brooks wrote the song with Bobby Wood and John Peppard.

"In Another's Eyes" was Brooks's and Yearwood's first major collaboration. At the time, the two were close friends but were married to other spouses, Brooks to Sandy Mahl and Yearwood to Bobby Reynolds; by 2001, each had divorced their respective spouse, and they married each other in 2005.

At the 40th Grammy Awards Brooks and Yearwood won for Best Country Collaboration with Vocals.

== Critical reception ==
Deborah Evans Price, of Billboard magazine reviewed the song favorably, calling it a "finely crafted song with a powerful lyric and delicate melody." She goes on to say that Brooks and Yearwood have a wonderful blend and natural chemistry that will make listeners wish they'd record together more often."

== Music video ==
The music video was directed by Michael Salomon and premiered in August 1997.

== Chart performance ==
"In Another's Eyes" debuted at number 62 on the U.S. Billboard Hot Country Singles & Tracks for the week of August 23, 1997.

Chart (1997)	Peak position
Canada Country Singles (RPM)	2
Irish Singles Chart	23
US Hot Country Songs (Billboard)	2

=== Year-end charts ===
Chart (1997)	Position
Canada Country Tracks (RPM)	44
US Country Songs (Billboard)	58

== Parodies ==
American country music parody artist Cledus T. Judd, released a parody of "In Another's Eyes" titled "In Another Size" on his 1999 album Juddmental.
