= Walkaway Joe =

Single by Trisha Yearwood featuring Don Henley

from the album Hearts in Armor
- B-side: "You Don't Have to Move to That Mountain"
- Released: November 2, 1992
- Studio: Sound Emporium (Nashville, Tennessee)
- Genre: Country
- Length: 4:19
- Label: MCA Nashville
- Songwriters: Vince Melamed; Greg Barnhill
- Producer: Garth Fundis

Trisha Yearwood singles chronology
"Wrong Side of Memphis" (1992)	"Walkaway Joe" (1992)	"You Say You Will" (1993)

Music video
- "Walkaway Joe" on YouTube

Don Henley singles chronology
"Sometimes Love Just Ain't Enough" (1992)	"Walkaway Joe" (1992)	"Sit Down, You're Rockin' the Boat" (1993)

"Walkaway Joe" is a song written by Vince Melamed and Greg Barnhill, and recorded by American country music singer Trisha Yearwood, with background vocals from Don Henley of the Eagles. It was released in November 1992 by MCA Nashville as the second single from her second album, Hearts in Armor (1992). The song reached number two on the US Billboard country charts, after debuting at number 60 in the week of November 7, 1992. Matthew McConaughey appears as the male lead in the accompanying music video. "Walkaway Joe" was nominated for Best Country Vocal Performance, Female at the 1994 Grammy Awards.

== Background and composition ==
After a performance on The Tonight Show, Yearwood met Don Henley of the Eagles and, after being invited to sing on her second album, he traveled to Nashville, Tennessee and recorded background vocals for the song.

"Walkaway Joe" is a mid-tempo ballad describing a failed relationship initiated by an over-eager 17-year-old girl ("Such are the dreams of an average Jane / Ninety miles an hour down lovers' lane") and an uninterested male (presumably embarking on a life of crime, as evidenced in the song's second verse), or "Walkaway Joe."

The song appeared in the CBS show Touched by an Angel. Episode 512 of the show entitled "Fool For Love" was based on the song.

== Critical reception ==
AllMusic editor Thom Jurek described the song favorably in his review of Hearts in Armor, saying, "Yearwood's telling the story she tells best, working-class love gone bad." Pan-European magazine Music & Media wrote, "This Georgia girl is on everybody's mind in the US. This Eagle-esque ballad gets more depth by Don Henley's harmony vocals. The Irish are no longer alone in loving folk's baby, country; the Swedes are into it too." In a review of Yearwood's 1997 greatest-hits package (Songbook) A Collection of Hits, Gordon Ely of the Richmond Times said, "It's not just a great song. It's memorable and only a shade shy of pure poetry. And it will be with us for a long time."

== Charts ==
=== Weekly charts ===
Chart (1992–1993)	Peak position
Australia (ARIA)	180
Canada Adult Contemporary (RPM)	30
Canada Country Singles (RPM)	2
US Hot Country Songs (Billboard)	2

=== Year-end charts ===
Chart (1993)	Position
Canada Country Tracks (RPM)	46
US Country Songs (Billboard)	56

== Certifications ==
Region	Certification	Certified units/sales
United States (RIAA)	Gold	500,000^{‡}
^{‡} Sales+streaming figures based on certification alone.
