= Wrong Side of Memphis =

Single by Trisha Yearwood

from the album Hearts in Armor
- B-side: "Lonesome Dove"
- Released: August 8, 1992
- Studio: Sound Emporium (Nashville, Tennessee)
- Genre: Country
- Length: 2:46
- Label: MCA
- Songwriters: Matraca Berg; Gary Harrison
- Producer: Garth Fundis

Trisha Yearwood singles chronology
"The Woman Before Me" (1992)	"Wrong Side of Memphis" (1992)	"Walkaway Joe" (1992)

"Wrong Side of Memphis" is a song written by Matraca Berg and Gary Harrison. First recorded by John Berry on his 1990 independent album Saddle the Wind, it was later released by American country music singer, Trisha Yearwood in August 1992. It was the first single released off her second studio album, Hearts in Armor.

== Content ==
The song tells the story of a woman who lives south of Memphis, Tennessee and has decided to take her chances and move to Nashville, Tennessee, where she can fulfill her dream of becoming a country music singer. Because Nashville (where the song's subject is destined) is to the northeast of Memphis, the area south of Memphis (where the song's subject begins) is considered the "wrong" side.

== Background ==
As revealed on an episode of Live From The Bluebird Cafe, the song is a semi-autobiographical account of a period when the song's writer, Matraca Berg, lived in Louisiana and became homesick for Nashville shortly thereafter. Gary Harrison said that "that song broke every one of those hard-and-fast rules that Nashville was still adhering to at the time. It had a drop D tuning, it just sort of drones, there's really no chorus to it[…]I never really thought there was a song there to begin with."

Although Yearwood is mainly known for her pop-styled ballads, "Wrong Side of Memphis" is one of the few songs she has released that is considered up-tempo and twangy. The music video for "Wrong Side of Memphis" was released following the single's release and debuted on CMT in 1992.

In the mid-nineties, Yearwood and her band heavily re-arranged the song to create a more soulful, bluesy feel. This revised version has now become a staple at Yearwood's concerts.

== Critical reception ==
"Wrong Side of Memphis" was given positive reviews by many music critics and reviewers. Allmusic reviewed Yearwood's album Hearts in Armor, and called the song a, "a tough, near spitting rocker tempered by honky tonk fiddles was written by Matraca Berg and Gary Harrison, opened the disc and may have thrown fans of her ballad style." About.com also reviewed her second studio album and critiqued all of the songs, including "Wrong Side of Memphis." The reviewer called the song "bluesy," and the only exception on the album that is not an emotional diary.

== Chart performance ==
"Wrong Side of Memphis" was released in 1992, and became a Top 10 hit, peaking at number 5 on the Billboard Country Chart by the end of the year. It was the most successful solo single from Yearwood's Hearts in Armor.

Chart (1992)	Peak position
Canada Country Singles (RPM)	4
US Hot Country Songs (Billboard)	5

=== Year-end charts ===
Chart (1992)	Position
Canada Country Tracks (RPM)	58
US Country Songs (Billboard)	69
