= I Would've Loved You Anyway =

Single by Trisha Yearwood

from the album Inside Out
- B-side: "Sad Eyes"
- Released: March 19, 2001
- Genre: Country
- Length: 3:41
- Label: MCA Nashville
- Songwriters: Mary Danna; Troy Verges
- Producers: Mark Wright; Trisha Yearwood

Trisha Yearwood singles chronology
"Where Are You Now" (2000)	"I Would've Loved You Anyway" (2001)	"Inside Out" (2001)

"I Would've Loved You Anyway" is a song written by Mary Danna and Troy Verges, and recorded by American country music singer Trisha Yearwood. It was released on March 19, 2001 as the lead single from her album Inside Out. The song became a Top 5 hit, peaking at number 4 on the Billboard Country Chart. It was Yearwood's first single in nearly two years to reach the Top 10 and is also her last single to reach the Top 10 to date. "I Would've Loved You Anyway" also peaked at number 44 on the Billboard Hot 100, nearly reaching the Top 40.

== Content ==
"I Would've Loved You Anyway" is a contemporary Country ballad about a relationship ending. A woman is reflecting over her relationship and its ultimate demise. She reveals that if she could have known how much pain the end of the relationship would bring, she still would have loved this person.

== Music video ==
The music video for "I Would've Loved You Anyway" was made following the single's release. The video was filmed in Spain, to avoid using noticeable landmarks in Nashville or Hollywood backlots. The video begins with Yearwood in the back seat of a car, leaving the home of her lover. One particular scene showcases Yearwood and her lover having a conversation (presumably ending their relationship) on a majestic cliff overlooking a village and rolling hills. Yearwood is also featured singing alone in a traditional Spanish villa.

== Chart performance ==
Chart (2001)	Peak position
US Hot Country Songs (Billboard)	4
US Billboard Hot 100	44

=== Year-end charts ===
Chart (2001)	Position
US Country Songs (Billboard)	17
