= Perfect Love =

Single by Trisha Yearwood

from the album (Songbook) A Collection of Hits
- B-side: "I Need You"
- Released: January 12, 1998
- Recorded: 1997
- Genre: Country
- Length: 2:56
- Label: MCA Nashville
- Songwriters: Sunny Russ, Stephony Smith
- Producers: Tony Brown, Trisha Yearwood

Trisha Yearwood singles chronology
"In Another's Eyes" (1997)	"Perfect Love" (1998)	"There Goes My Baby" (1998)

"Perfect Love" is a song written by Sunny Russ and Stephony Smith, and recorded by American country music artist Trisha Yearwood. It was released in January 1998 as the third and final single from her compilation album (Songbook) A Collection of Hits. The song reached the top of the US Billboard Hot Country Singles & Tracks chart becoming her fifth and final number one to date.

== Critical reception ==
Deborah Evans Price, of Billboard magazine reviewed the song favorably, calling it an "infectious, uptempo tune that celebrates the joys of being in love." She goes on to say that Yearwood delivers the song with "her usual passion and vibrancy."

== Music video ==
The music video was directed by Gerry Wenner and premiered in January 1998. It shows Yearwood performing the song in a vintage novelty shop, and a young couple, an elderly couple, and two kids walking through the shop, trying on clothes, dancing, and looking at the toys and pictures that eventually come to life.

== Chart positions ==
"Perfect Love" debuted at number 61 on the U.S. Billboard Hot Country Singles & Tracks for the week of January 17, 1998.

Chart (1998)	Peak position
Canada Country Singles (RPM)	1
US Hot Country Songs (Billboard)	1

=== Year-end charts ===
Chart (1998)	Position
Canada Country Tracks (RPM)	27
US Country Songs (Billboard)	19
