= She's in Love with the Boy =

Single by Trisha Yearwood

from the album Trisha Yearwood
- B-side: "Victim of the Game"
- Released: March 13, 1991
- Recorded: 1990
- Studio: Sound Emporium (Nashville, Tennessee)
- Genre: Country
- Length: 4:08
- Label: MCA
- Songwriter: Jon Ims
- Producer: Garth Fundis

Trisha Yearwood singles chronology
"She's in Love with the Boy" (1991)	"Like We Never Had a Broken Heart" (1991)

"She's in Love with the Boy" is a song by American country music artist Trisha Yearwood. It was written by Jon Ims and was released on March 13, 1991, as her debut single, as well as the first single from her self-titled debut album. The song reached number one on the Billboard U.S. Hot Country Singles & Tracks chart and was the first of five number ones on the country chart for Yearwood.

== Content ==
The song is an upbeat ballad about a teenage couple named Katie and Tommy in a small town becoming betrothed. Katie's father does not approve of their relationship, and after the couple returns home late after a date, he angrily confronts them. But Katie's mother comes to their defense, pointing out to Katie's father that they were no different from Katie and Tommy when they were teenagers and how her own father disapproved of the relationship, but she married him anyway and that Katie will do the same with Tommy.

== Personnel ==
Credits are adapted from the liner notes of Trisha Yearwood.

- Bobby All – acoustic guitar
- Eddie Bayers – drums
- Paul Franklin – steel guitar
- Garth Fundis – backing vocals
- Rob Hajacos – fiddle
- Brent Mason – electric guitar
- Dave Pomeroy – bass guitar
- Matt Rollings – piano
- Trisha Yearwood – lead and backing vocals

== Critical reception ==
In 2014, Rolling Stone ranked the song at #129 on its 200 Greatest Country Songs of All Time ranking.

== Music video ==
The music video was directed by Marc Ball and premiered in early 1991. It takes place on a farm and it shows some farm animals moving to the music and it shows shots of a pre-teen couple, a young adult couple, and an elderly couple, along with Yearwood sitting on a stool singing.

== Chart positions ==
Chart (1991)	Peak position
Canada Country Singles (RPM)	1
US Hot Country Songs (Billboard)	1

=== Year-end charts ===
Chart (1991)	Position
Canada Country Tracks (RPM)	14
US Country Songs (Billboard)	18

== Certifications ==
Region	Certification	Certified units/sales
United States (RIAA)	2× Platinum	2,000,000^{‡}
^{‡} Sales+streaming figures based on certification alone.
