= Garth Fundis =

American record producer

- Genres: Country
- Occupation: Record producer
- Years active: 1970s-present

Garth Fundis is an American country music record producer. Active since the 1970s, Fundis has produced albums for several country artists, including Alabama, Don Williams, Trisha Yearwood, Sugarland, and Keith Whitley. He has also served as a judge on the Colgate Country Showdown.

In the mid-1990s, Fundis was the director of operations for Almo Sounds' Nashville division.
