= Guide Me Back Home =

Live album by City and Colour
- Released: 5 October 2018
- Recorded: 2017
- Length: 97:44
- Label: Still Records
- Producer: Karl Bareham

City and Colour chronology
If I Should Go Before You (2015)	Guide Me Back Home (2018)	A Pill for Loneliness (2019)

Guide Me Back Home is a live album by Canadian artist City and Colour. It was recorded during spring 2017 on a tour of Canada, featuring a selection of songs from previous albums performed solo, and a cover of Elliott Smith's Twilight. It was released digitally on October 5, 2018 and physically on November 23, 2018. The album peaked at number 53 on the Canadian Albums Chart

== Track list ==
All tracks are written by Dallas Green, except "Twilight", written by Steven Paul Smith.

No.	Title	Length
1.	"Forgive Me / Two Coins"	7:18
2.	"Friends"	5:59
3.	"What Makes A Man?"	4:02
4.	"If I Should Go Before You"	4:08
5.	"We Found Each Other In The Dark"	6:27
6.	"Silver And Gold"	6:25
7.	"Hello, I'm In Delaware"	5:20
8.	"O' Sister"	4:20
9.	"Runaway"	3:55
10.	"Twilight" (Elliott Smith cover)	4:16
11.	"Casey's Song"	4:18
12.	"Lover Come Back"	3:50
13.	"As Much As I Ever Could"	5:51
14.	"Paradise"	5:19
15.	"Against The Grain"	4:11
16.	"Comin' Home"	4:52
17.	"Sensible Heart"	4:24
18.	"Waiting..."	5:04
19.	"The Girl"	3:12
20.	"Sleeping Sickness"	4:33

== Personnel ==
Musicians

- Dallas Green – vocals, guitar, harmonica
- Matt Kelly – piano, keyboards, pedal steel, guitar, background vocals

Technical personnel

- Karl Bareham – producer, engineer, mixing
- Luke Schindler – assistant engineer
- João Carvalho – mastering
- Bryan Lowe – mastering assistant

== Chart performance ==
Chart (2018)	Peak position
Canadian Albums Chart	53
