= Forgive Me =

Forgive Me may refer to:

== Films and television ==
- Forgive Me (TV series), a 2013 television series
- Forgive Me (original title: Vergeef me), a 2001 film by Cyrus Frisch

== Music ==
=== Albums ===
- Forgive Me (Eric Saade album), 2013
- Forgive Me (Maher Zain album), 2012

=== EPs ===
- Forgive Me (EP), a 2022 EP by BoA

=== Songs ===
- "Forgive Me" (Chloe x Halle song), 2020
- "Forgive Me" (Joel Compass song), 2014
- "Forgive Me" (Leona Lewis song), 2008
- "Forgive Me" (Lynden David Hall song), 2000
- "Forgive Me", a 2008 song by City and Colour from the album Bring Me Your Love
- "Forgive Me", a 1984 song by Donna Summer from the album Cats Without Claws
- "Forgive Me", a 1999 song by Evanescence from the EP Sound Asleep
- "Forgive Me", a 2000 song by Godsmack from the album Awake
- "Forgive Me", a 2007 song by Group 1 Crew from the album Group 1 Crew
- "Forgive Me", a 2008 song by Ida Maria from the album Fortress Round My Heart
- "Forgive Me", a 2009 song by Jars of Clay from the album The Long Fall Back to Earth
- "Forgive Me", a 1957 song by the McGuire Sisters
- "Forgive Me", a 2007 song by Missy Higgins from the album On a Clear Night
- "Forgive Me", a 1957 song by Pat Boone from the album Howdy!
- "Forgive Me", a 2005 song by Proof in his album Searching for Jerry Garcia
- "Forgive Me", a 2005 song by Rebecca St. James from the album If I Had One Chance to Tell You Something
- "Forgive Me", a 2002 song by Sandra from the album The Wheel of Time
- "Forgive Me", a classical music song by Valery Gavrilin to a text by Alexander Volodin
- "Forgive Me", a 2005 song by Versus the World from the album Versus the World
- "(Forgive Me) My Little Flower Princess", a 1984 song by John Lennon and Yoko Ono from the album Milk and Honey
- "Forgive Me", a 2007 song by C-Note
- "Forgive Me", a 2022 song by BoA

== See also ==
- "Ghetto Qu'ran (Forgive Me)", a 1999 song by 50 Cent
- The Persecutor, also known as Forgive Me Natasha, the autobiography of Sergei Kourdakov, a former KGB agent
- Forgive Me My Love, a 2000 album by Russian singer Zemfira
- Forgiveness (disambiguation)
