= Out Here in the Water =

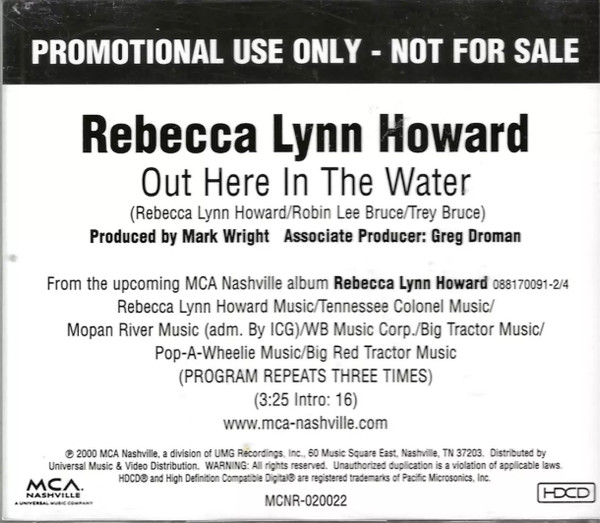

Single by Rebecca Lynn Howard

from the album Rebecca Lynn Howard
- Released: February 7, 2000
- Recorded: 1999
- Studio: Javelina Recording Studios (Nashville, TN)
- Genre: Country blues
- Length: 3:26
- Label: MCA Nashville
- Songwriters: Rebecca Lynn Howard; Trey Bruce; Robin Lee Bruce
- Producer: Mark Wright

Rebecca Lynn Howard singles chronology
| "When My Dreams Come True" (1999) | "Out Here in the Water" (2000) | "I Don't Paint Myself into Corners" (2000) |

Music video
- "Out Here in the Water" on YouTube

"Out Here in the Water" is a song co-written and recorded by American country music singer-songwriter Rebecca Lynn Howard, released as the second single from her self-titled debut album (2000) on February 7, 2000. Howard co-wrote the track with Trey Bruce and Robin Lee Bruce, with Mark Wright producing it. Although it was not a commercial success, it was the highest-peaking single from Howard's debut album, peaking at number 54 on the US Billboard Hot Country Songs chart.

== Content ==
The racy track uses fishing metaphors to describe a couple getting intimately together.

== Critical reception ==
Phyllis Stark of Billboard named it the ninth best country song of 2000.

== Music video ==
Guy Guillet directed the video for the track in Palmdale, California. It was released on January 9, 2000, to Country Music Television (CMT).

== Charts ==
| Chart (2000) | Peak position |
|---|---|
| Canada Country Singles (RPM) | 73 |
| US Hot Country Songs (Billboard) | 54 |
| US Country Top 50 (Radio & Records) | 44 |
