= List of Billboard Adult Contemporary number ones of 2002 =

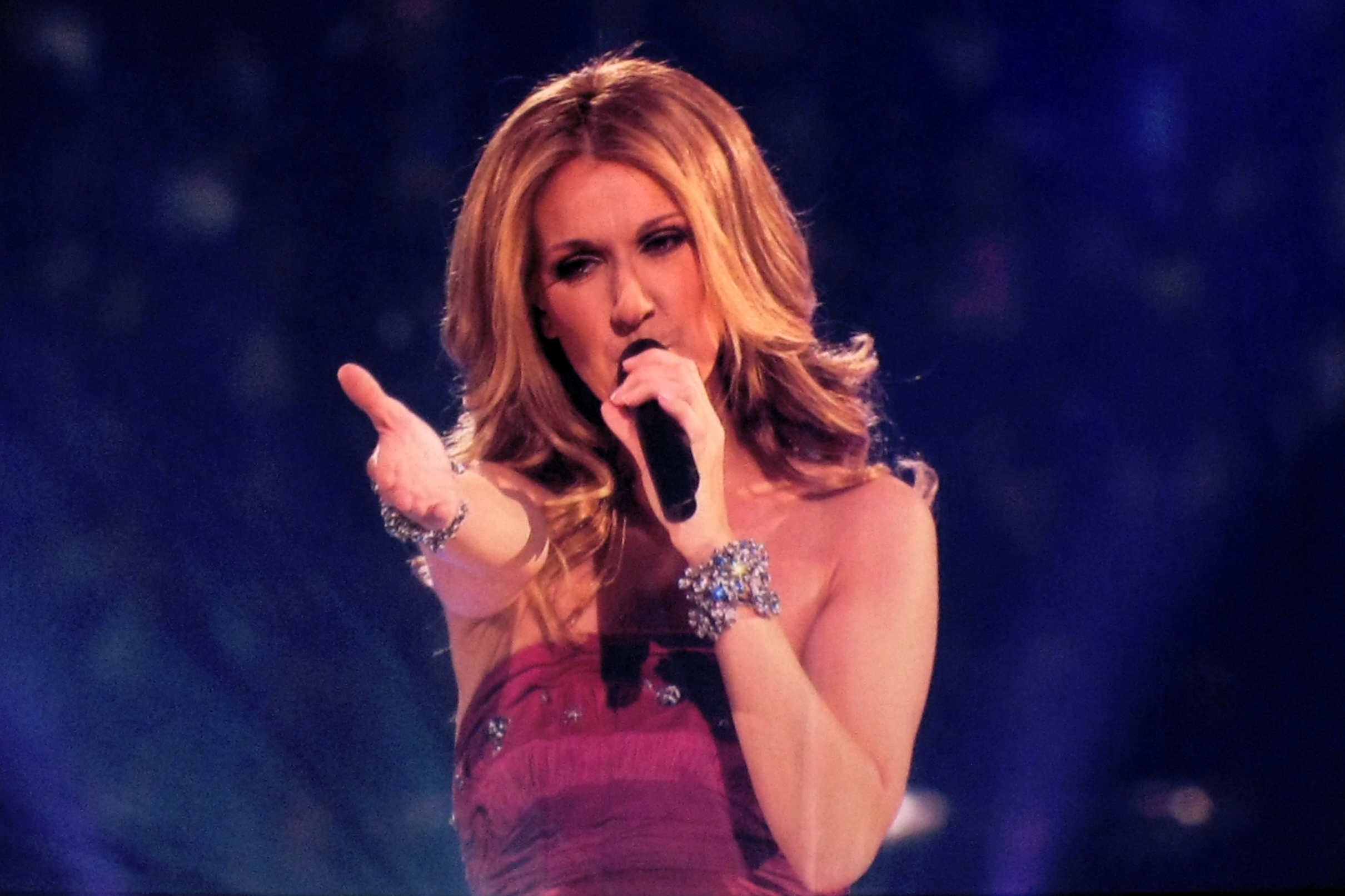
Celine Dion's "A New Day Has Come" held the number one spot on the Adult Contemporary chart for a record-breaking 21 consecutive weeks.

Adult Contemporary is a chart published by Billboard ranking the top-performing songs in the United States in the adult contemporary music (AC) market. In 2002, nine different songs topped the chart in 52 issues of the magazine, based on weekly airplay data from radio stations compiled by Nielsen Broadcast Data Systems.

In the first issue of Billboard of the new year, the number one song was "Simple Things", a collaboration between the pianist Jim Brickman and the singer Rebecca Lynn Howard, which moved into the top spot that week. Despite going all the way to number one on the AC listing, the song did not enter Billboard's all-genre chart, the Hot 100, at all. Brickman, whose recordings mix pop and new-age music, has regularly placed songs on the AC chart since the 1990s, but "Valentine", which reached number 50 in 1997, is his only song ever to cross over to the Hot 100. After one week in the top spot, "Simple Things" was displaced by "Hero" by Enrique Iglesias, which spent eleven weeks at number one, adding to the four which it had accumulated at the end of 2001.

In the issue of Billboard dated March 30, the Canadian singer Celine Dion, the most successful act on the AC chart during the 1990s, reached number one with "A New Day Has Come", the lead single from her first album after a hiatus from the music business during which she gave birth to her first child. The song went on to hold the top spot for 21 consecutive weeks, breaking the record for the highest total number of weeks atop the AC chart previously shared by "You'll Be in My Heart" by Phil Collins (1999) and Dion's own "Because You Loved Me" (1996), both of which spent 19 weeks at number one. Such lengthy spells in the top spot would become a feature of the AC chart in the 21st century: by 2019, a further eight songs had spent 20 or more weeks at number one. None of 2002's AC chart-toppers reached number one on the Hot 100; in September, "Do It for Love" by Hall & Oates became the second song of the year to top the AC listing without entering the Hot 100 at all. The number one position on the Hot 100 was largely dominated in 2002 by R&B and hip-hop artists such as Ashanti and Nelly. The only act with more than one AC number one during the year was Josh Groban, who topped the chart for two weeks with "To Where You Are" in August and returned to the top spot in the final issue of Billboard of the year with his rendition of the 19th century Christmas song "O Holy Night". The only song with multiple spells at number one during the year was "Cry" by Faith Hill, which had two three-week spells in the peak position, separated by a single week when "Can't Stop Loving You" by Phil Collins took the top spot.

== Chart history ==
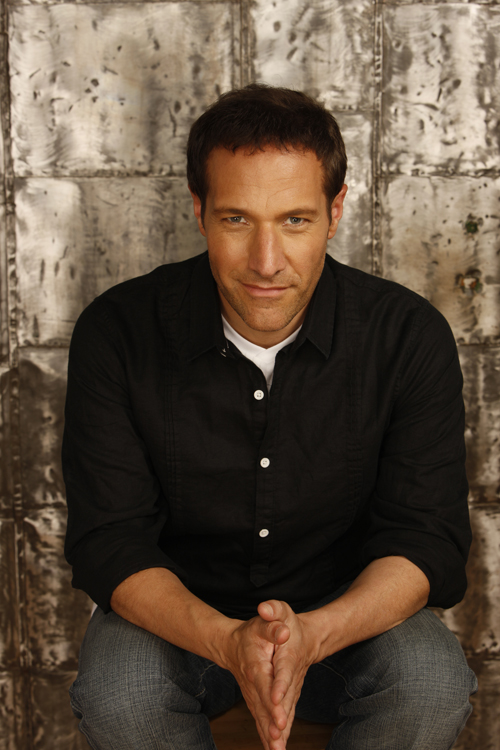
The pianist Jim Brickman collaborated with the vocalist Rebecca Lynn Howard on "Simple Things", the year's first chart-topper.

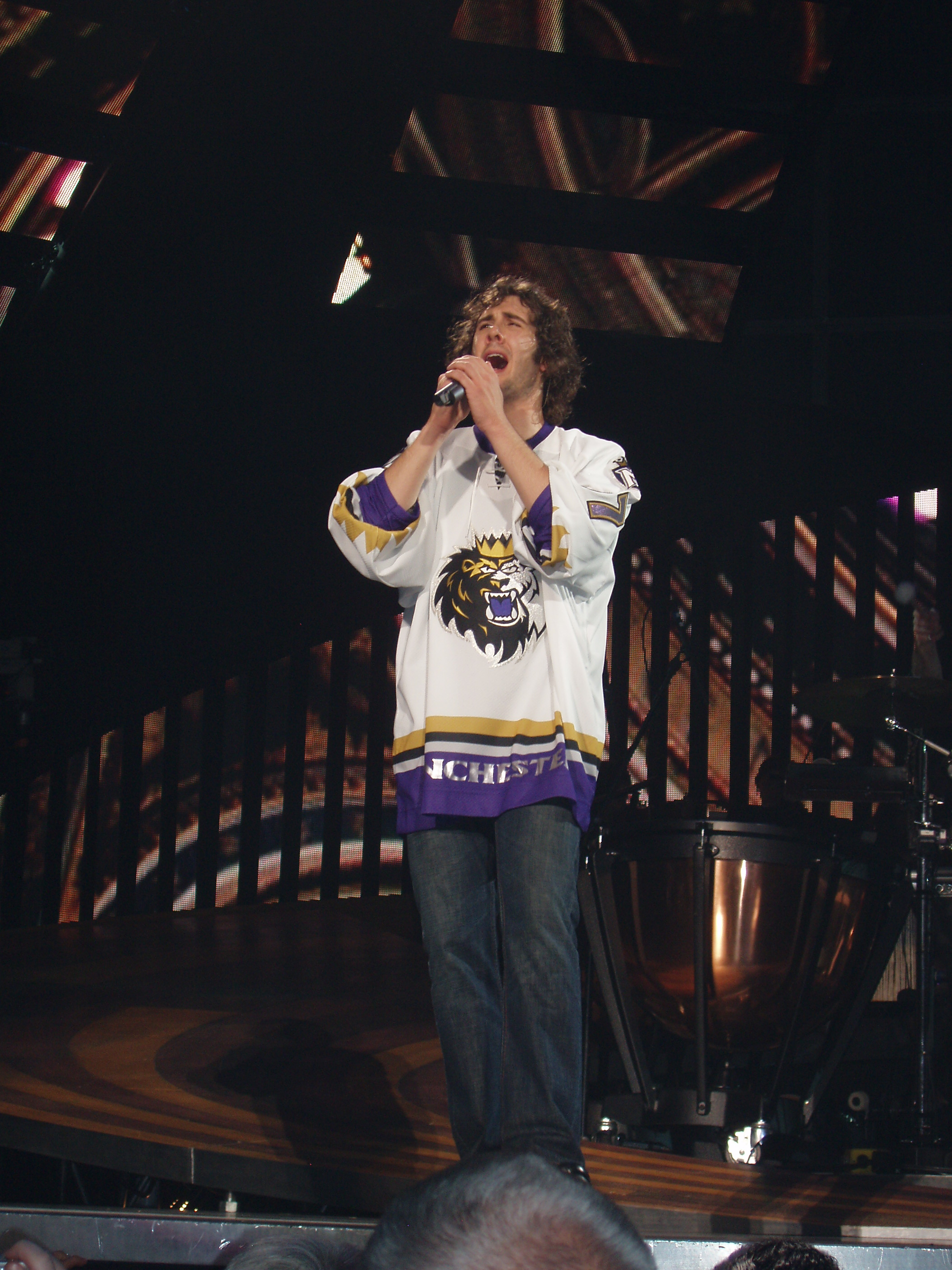
Josh Groban was the only act with more than one AC number one in 2002.

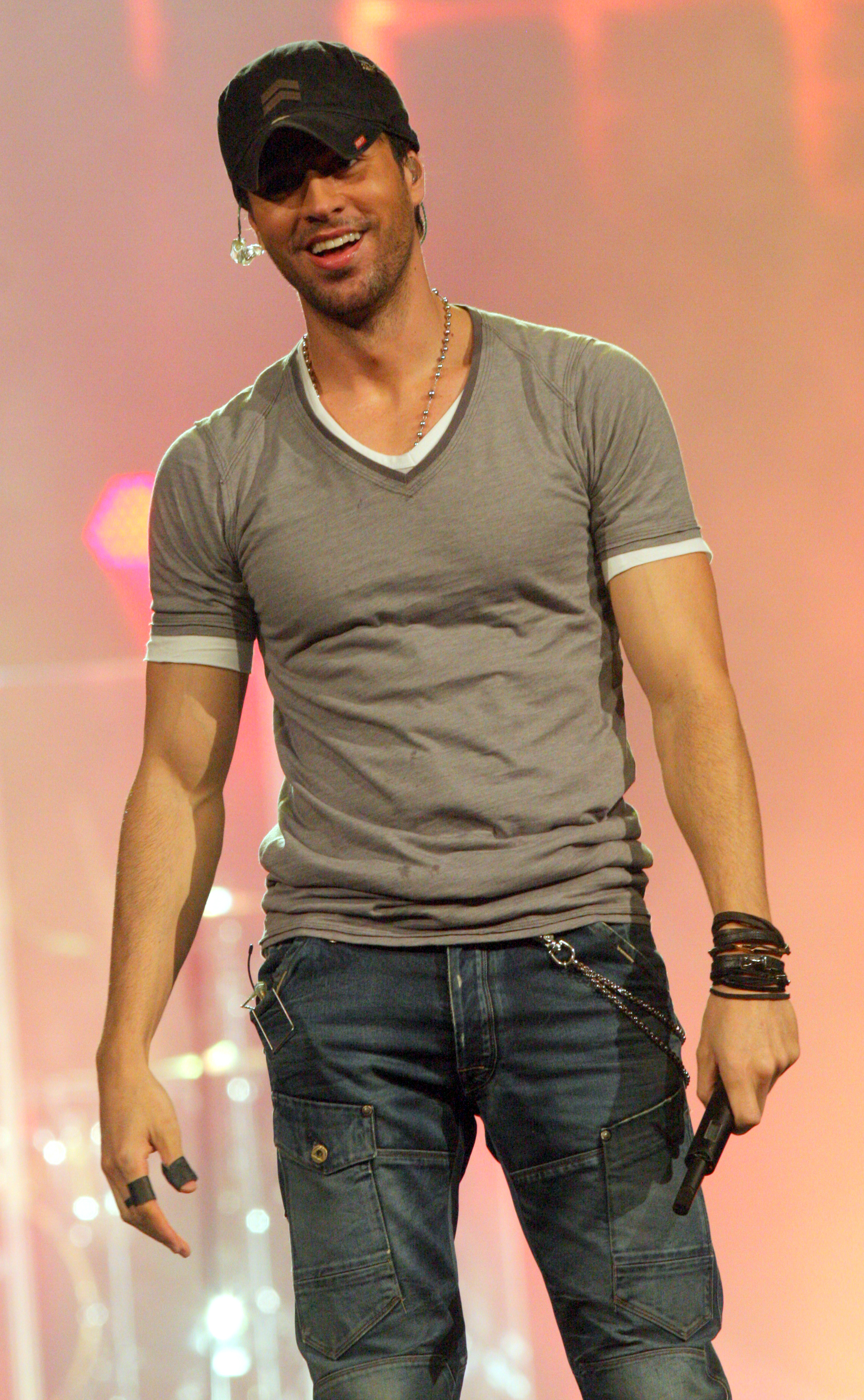
The Spanish singer Enrique Iglesias spent a total of 11 weeks at number one with his song "Hero".

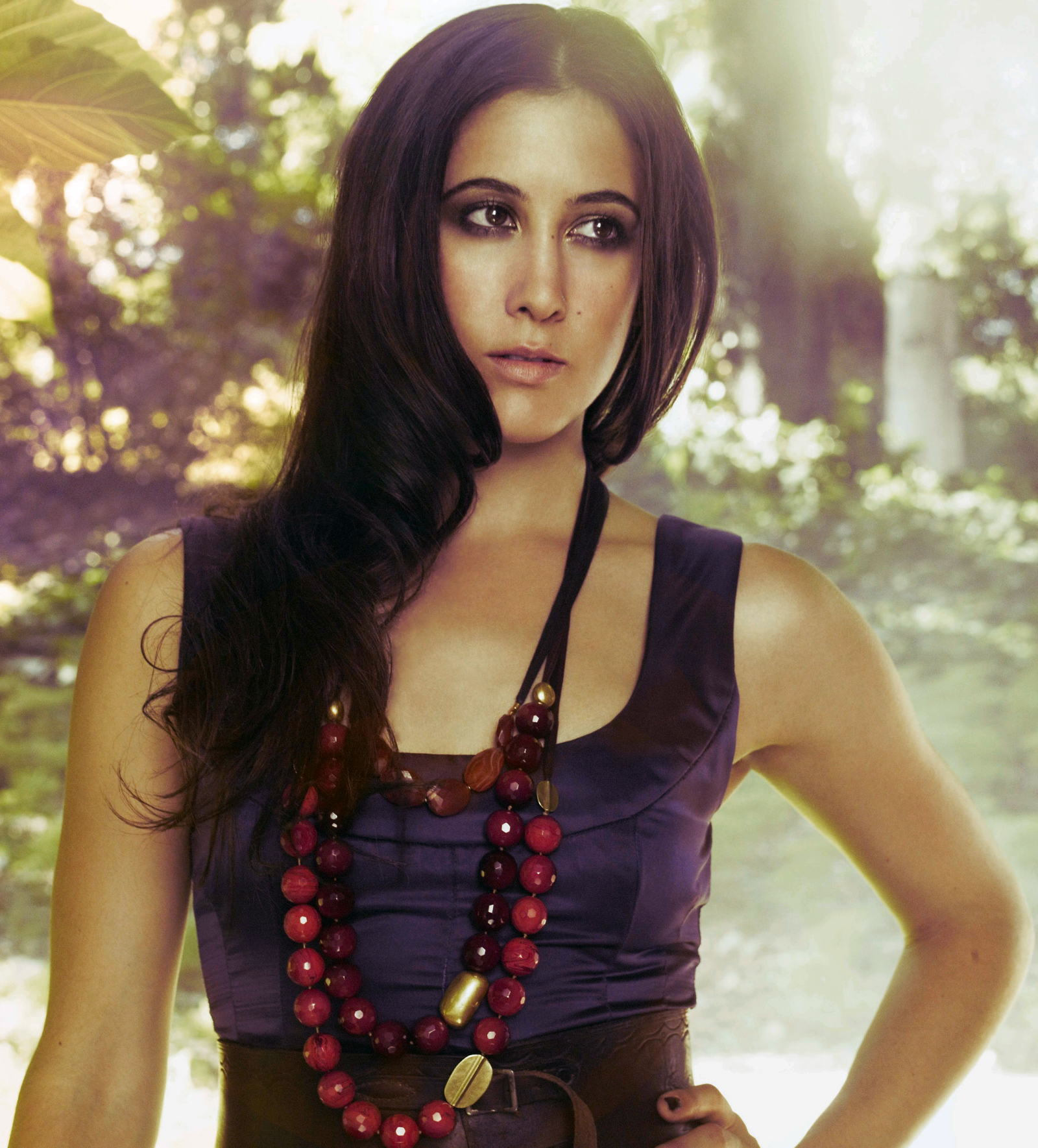
Vanessa Carlton spent seven weeks at number one with "A Thousand Miles".

Chart history
Issue date	Title	Artist(s)	Ref.
January 5	"Simple Things"	Jim Brickman with Rebecca Lynn Howard	
January 12	"Hero"	Enrique Iglesias	
January 19	"Hero"	Enrique Iglesias	
January 26	"Hero"	Enrique Iglesias	
February 2	"Hero"	Enrique Iglesias	
February 9	"Hero"	Enrique Iglesias	
February 16	"Hero"	Enrique Iglesias	
February 23	"Hero"	Enrique Iglesias	
March 2	"Hero"	Enrique Iglesias	
March 9	"Hero"	Enrique Iglesias	
March 16	"Hero"	Enrique Iglesias	
March 23	"Hero"	Enrique Iglesias	
March 30	"A New Day Has Come"	Celine Dion	
April 6	"A New Day Has Come"	Celine Dion	
April 13	"A New Day Has Come"	Celine Dion	
April 20	"A New Day Has Come"	Celine Dion	
April 27	"A New Day Has Come"	Celine Dion	
May 4	"A New Day Has Come"	Celine Dion	
May 11	"A New Day Has Come"	Celine Dion	
May 18	"A New Day Has Come"	Celine Dion	
May 25	"A New Day Has Come"	Celine Dion	
June 1	"A New Day Has Come"	Celine Dion	
June 8	"A New Day Has Come"	Celine Dion	
June 15	"A New Day Has Come"	Celine Dion	
June 22	"A New Day Has Come"	Celine Dion	
June 29	"A New Day Has Come"	Celine Dion	
July 6	"A New Day Has Come"	Celine Dion	
July 13	"A New Day Has Come"	Celine Dion	
July 20	"A New Day Has Come"	Celine Dion	
July 27	"A New Day Has Come"	Celine Dion	
August 3	"A New Day Has Come"	Celine Dion	
August 10	"A New Day Has Come"	Celine Dion	
August 17	"A New Day Has Come"	Celine Dion	
August 24	"To Where You Are"	Josh Groban	
August 31	"To Where You Are"	Josh Groban	
September 7	"Do It for Love"	Hall & Oates	
September 14	"Do It for Love"	Hall & Oates	
September 21	"A Thousand Miles"	Vanessa Carlton	
September 28	"A Thousand Miles"	Vanessa Carlton	
October 5	"A Thousand Miles"	Vanessa Carlton	
October 12	"A Thousand Miles"	Vanessa Carlton	
October 19	"A Thousand Miles"	Vanessa Carlton	
October 26	"A Thousand Miles"	Vanessa Carlton	
November 2	"A Thousand Miles"	Vanessa Carlton	
November 9	"Cry"	Faith Hill	
November 16	"Cry"	Faith Hill	
November 23	"Cry"	Faith Hill	
November 30	"Can't Stop Loving You"	Phil Collins	
December 7	"Cry"	Faith Hill	
December 14	"Cry"	Faith Hill	
December 21	"Cry"	Faith Hill	
December 28	"O Holy Night"	Josh Groban	

== See also ==
- 2002 in music
- List of artists who reached number one on the U.S. Adult Contemporary chart
