= Bring Me Your Love =

Bring Me Your Love may refer to:

- "Bring Me Your Love" (short story), a 1983 short story by Charles Bukowski
- Bring Me Your Love (album), a 2008 album by City and Colour, named after the story
- Bring Me Your Love, a short film directed by David Morrissey, based on the story
- "Bring Me Your Love" (song), by Deee-Lite, 1994
- "Bring Me Your Love", a song by Hank Ballard, 1962
- "Bring Me Your Love", a song by Nick Kamen, 1988
- "Bring Me Your Love", a song by Tommy Sands, 1959
