= Racette =

Racette is a surname. Notable people with the surname include:

- Francine Racette (born 1947), Canadian actress
- Geneviève Racette (born 1990), Canadian singer-songwriter
- Patricia Racette (born 1965), American opera singer
- Sherry Farrell Racette (born 1952), Métis-Canadian feminist scholar, author, and artist
