= City and Colour =

Canadian musician (born 1980)

Dallas Green
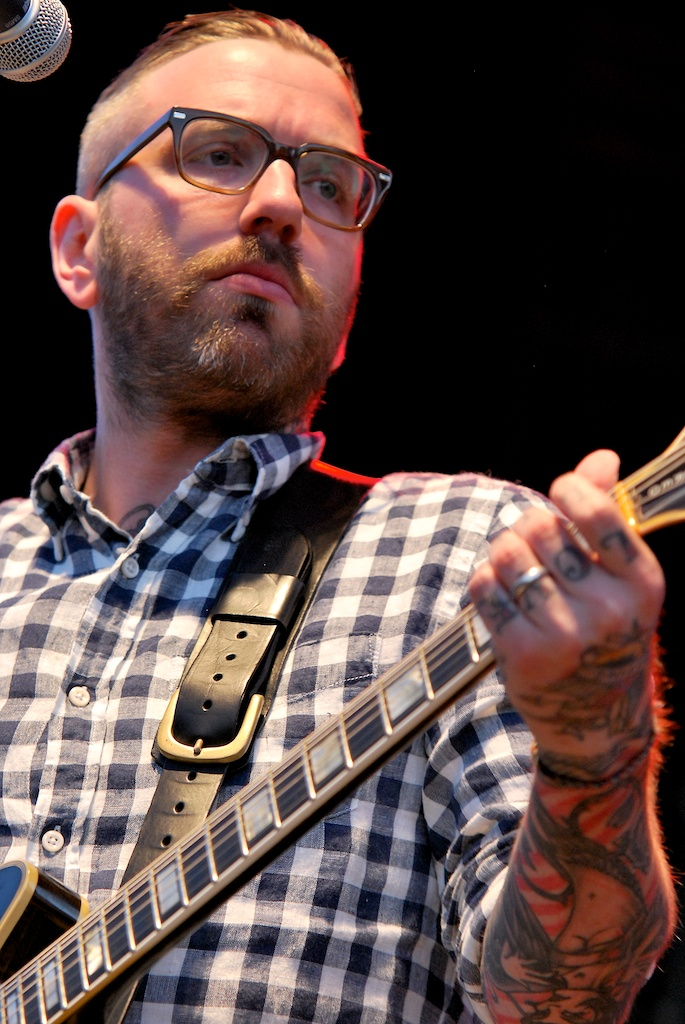
- Green performing in 2011

Background information
- Also known as: City and Colour
- Born: Dallas Michael John Albert Green; September 29, 1980 (age 46); St. Catharines, Ontario, Canada
- Genres: Indie folk; acoustic; alternative rock; post-hardcore; screamo; melodic hardcore
- Occupations: Musician; singer; songwriter; record producer
- Instruments: Vocals, guitar, piano
- Years active: 2001–present
- Labels: Dine Alone; Vagrant; Still
- Member of: Alexisonfire; You+Me
- Website: cityandcolour.ca

Dallas Michael John Albert Green (born September 29, 1980) is a Canadian musician, singer, songwriter and record producer who records under the name City and Colour. He is also known for his contributions as a singer, rhythm guitarist, songwriter, and co-founder of the post-hardcore band Alexisonfire. In 2005, he debuted his first full-length album, Sometimes, which achieved platinum certification in 2006. City and Colour began performing in small intimate venues between Alexisonfire tours. The name City and Colour comes from his own name: Dallas, a city, and Green, a colour. His reasoning for the name was that he felt uneasy "putting the album out under the name Dallas Green".

== Early life ==
Green was born on September 29, 1980, in St. Catharines, Ontario. Green was named after Philadelphia Phillies manager Dallas Green. Green has stated that he had gone without a name at first; his mother was considering naming him Graham-Todd Green, but his father had bet on the Phillies during the 1980 World Series that October and, after the team won, his parents decided on the name Dallas after the Phillies' manager. Green started playing piano at the age of 8 and writing music since he was around the age of 14. The first album that he bought with his own money was Alice in Chains' Dirt (1992). He bought it on his 12th birthday, on September 29, 1992. Green said that if people want to get to the bottom of why he makes music the way that he does, it is because of Alice in Chains.

== Career ==
=== Early work ===
Before joining Alexisonfire, Green was in a band called Helicon Blue, producing several songs before breaking up. The three piece band also featured Marcel Lanteigne on bass and vocal, and Nicholas Osczypko on drums. The band recorded a self-titled release on their own, subsequently recording a second EP with Greg Below from Distort Entertainment. A collection of nine Helicon Blue tracks were released by Dine Alone Records in 2016 as a part of their 10-year anniversary celebrations.

=== Alexisonfire ===
Dallas began playing with Alexisonfire in late 2001. They released four albums (Alexisonfire, Watch Out!, Crisis, and Old Crows / Young Cardinals) and two EPs before disbanding in 2011 due to Dallas' decision to focus on his work in City and Colour full-time.

Dallas came up with the name of the band from an episode on Discovery Channel. This specific episode was about contortionism. In this show there was a segment on a stripper who added contortionism into her show, as well as lactating and breathing fire. The woman's stage name was Alexis Fire, and the segment was called Alexisonfire. He thought that this would be a cool name for a band, and that is where it all started.

In 2003, Dallas appeared (along with Alexisonfire vocalist George Pettit) on Jude the Obscure's album "The Coldest Winter", doing additional vocals on 3 songs. He contributed vocals to Neverending White Lights' collaborative album Act 1: Goodbye Friends of the Heavenly Bodies, released in 2005, on the song "The Grace". Green provided additional vocals on the track "INRihab" with Every Time I Die as well as on the track "Black Albino Bones" with Fucked Up on their second full-length album, The Chemistry of Common Life.

=== City and Colour ===
==== Sometimes (2005–2007) ====
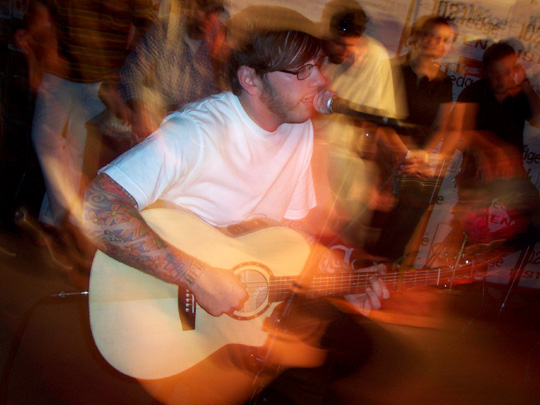
Green performing at Edge102.1 Radio Studios in July 2005

Green began releasing City and Colour songs on the internet for fans to download. Green said that he had been writing material for it as early as when he was 16 years old. Eventually, he compiled and rewrote several of these songs to make his first album, Sometimes. The full-length debut was released on November 1, 2005, to a good reception, described by one reviewer as "dynamically gentle and vulnerable". The cover art was designed by Scott McEwan, in a tattoo-esque style; Green "still may decide to have some of them inked at a later point in time".

Green indicated that his view that the "best music for [him] is sad music", influenced the type of songs he created. He stated he helped Kelsey Brown with the playing of guitar. He also said that he "love[s] music to sort of escape to" and the idea of sad music that people could identify with. Green said of the album that, "a lot of those songs are written on some of the experiences I've been through and stuff and that's just how I deal with it. I just write songs when I'm bummed out and I feel happier." Sometimes won the 2007 Juno award for Alternative Album of the Year.

==== Bring Me Your Love (2008–2009) ====
Bring Me Your Love is Green's second full-length album. It was released on February 12, 2008, and features a wide array of instruments not used on his previous recordings (such as harmonica, banjo, drums and lap steel) giving it a more folk-influenced sound. The album also features collaborations with other musicians, such as Canadian musician Gordon Downie of The Tragically Hip on the track "Sleeping Sickness", and additional instrumentals done by Matt Sullivan and the members of Attack in Black. The lead single, "Waiting...", peaked at No. 32 on the Canadian Hot 100. The album is named after a short story by Charles Bukowski. It is also a line sung in the closing track, "As Much As I Ever Could." Green has stated that he saw Bukowski's book in a book store while on tour and adopted the title for his new album. On September 26, 2008, City and Colour embarked on their first American tour, in support of Bring Me Your Love. On the tour, the band supported Tegan and Sara along with Girl in a Coma. This tour was followed by a headlining tour of the US in January 2009, with support from William Elliott Whitmore. In October 2008, Dine Alone Records announced a special 2-disc limited edition of Bring Me Your Love to be released on December 2, 2008. Only 6,000 copies were available; 5,000 in North America and 1,000 in Australia.

==== Little Hell (2010–2012) ====
In January 2010, City and Colour embarked on an additional US headlining tour, again supporting Bring Me Your Love, with supporting act Lissie, and an additional UK tour in June 2010, supporting P!nk, along with Butch Walker, along with a few headlining dates. On these tours, Green has performed two new songs by the titles of "Silver and Gold" and "Oh Sister", as well as a couple of never-played-before covers - "Murderer", originally by Low, and "Grinnin' In Your Face", originally by Son House. In an interview with Alter the Press, Green has revealed that he has written a bunch of new songs and he just needs to record them for his next record, hinting on a possible early 2011 release date for his third studio album. He said that there are 15 songs that he really likes and he expects around 10 to appear on his next album. On September 2, 2010, it was announced on MTV News Canada that Green had been in the studio with Polaris Prize nominee Shad working on a remix of a Shad song as well as an original song to be released as a 12" vinyl single. Dallas was quoted as saying "I've always wanted to be the Mary J. Blige to somebody's Method Man". The remix is to Shad's song "Listen" from his latest album TSOL, and the new song that Green co-wrote is titled "Live Forever". On September 30, 2010, it was announced that Green planned to start recording his third studio album in January 2011, after demoing 14 songs. "There are a lot of musically unusual songs." Green has said about the record, "There's a lot more piano on these songs, keyboards and stuff. And there are a couple of songs almost I would say a bit rockin', if that makes any sense, not in a heavy metal kind of way, but just a little bit more upbeat than what you're used to hearing from me." On November 9, 2010, Green announced via Twitter that he would be releasing a new single on iTunes called "At the Bird's Foot" which will be on a compilation album called Gasoline Rainbows, which also features new songs by such artists as Damien Rice and Amy Kuney. The song was written by Green in response to the oil spill in the Gulf. All proceeds from the album will go directly to Global Green USA. "At the Bird's Foot" was first made available for 48-hour streaming on the Gasoline Rainbows Myspace page on November 23, 2010, and features Amanda Zelina of the band The Coppertone on vocals. In an interview with Reverb Magazine's Sean Frazer, Green spilled news of an upcoming 2011 album release, saying "Hopefully I am going to start recording in January so I'm hoping that there will be another album by next Summer/Spring."

On February 15, 2011, Green performed a specially recorded version of "Northern Wind" on the Valentine's Day episode of One Tree Hill. On February 23, 2011, it was officially announced on the Dine Alone Records website that City and Colour's third album will be titled Little Hell and is set for release in June 2011. On March 23, 2011, the official track listing was posted on City and Colour's official website. Release date for the album was set to June 7, 2011. In an interview with Radar Radio's Reegan McLaughlin, Green said 'I look at people like Bob Dylan back in the day and he'd have pages of lyrics and would have to decide out of seven, eight of nine verses which three were the best. I think to myself, I have to struggle to get two verses I am happy with in a song' Green also said 'I think melodies come relatively easy to me because I've been singing so long but lyrics, it's a battle to get to a point when I am happy with a song.' On March 27, 2011, City and Colour performed Neil Young's "Old Man" as part of the four song tribute to Toronto during the Juno Awards of 2011. On April 5, 2011, "Fragile Bird", the first single off Little Hell was released to the radio. The song had its world premiere on Australian radio station Triple J, where the band was touring a sold-out tour at the time. The single became City and Colour's highest-charting single, reaching No. 1 on the Canadian rock/alternative chart. City and Colour has been announced to be performing as part of The Voodoo Experience 2011, which is held at City Park in New Orleans, Louisiana on October 28–30. On August 5, 2011, Alexisonfire announced their break-up. George Pettit wrote a message on the band's official website saying Dallas had been planning to leave to focus on City and Colour, as balancing the two bands had become too difficult. On December 17, Biffy Clyro announced that City and Colour would be the main support on their 2013 arena tour, in support of their new album.

==== The Hurry and the Harm (2013) ====
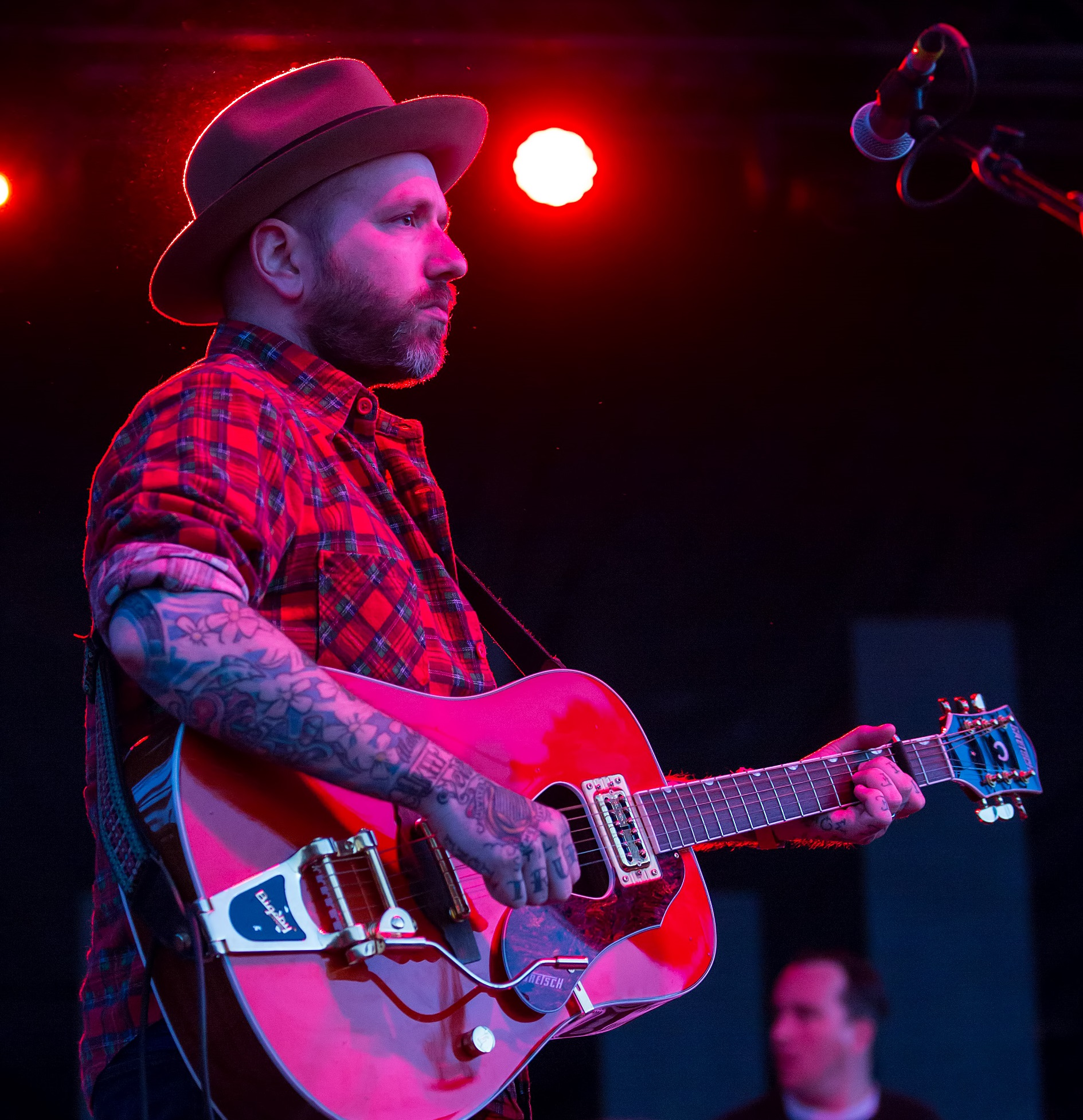
City and Colour performing at Fun Fun Fun Fest 2014 in Austin, Texas

City and Colour announced the release of the new album entitled The Hurry and the Harm to be released on June 4, 2013. The song "Of Space and Time" was released on March 11, 2013, prior to the announcement of the new album. The track listing includes 12 songs; the special iTunes deluxe version, available for pre-order in April, will include 3 extra tracks for a total of 15 new songs. The song "Thirst" was released on April 1, 2013, on City and Colour's SoundCloud page. The album was unofficially leaked on May 22, 2013. The album cover shows Green's face which felt weird for him, since he always wanted his music to be about his songs and not about himself.

In October 2014, City and Colour was selected as the headline act for the grand opening of the Meridian Centre, St. Catharines' new 50 million dollar hockey and performance arena.

==== If I Should Go Before You (2015) ====
City and Colour announced the release of the new album entitled If I Should Go Before You to be released on October 9, 2015. The song "Woman" was released exclusively on Beats 1 station on Apple Music on July 16, 2015, hosted by Zane Lowe.

==== Guide Me Back Home (2018) ====
In September 2018, City and Colour announced the release of a new compilation album of live songs called Guide Me Back Home. It was recorded during Dallas' 2017 "An Evening with City and Colour Solo Canadian tour", to be released digitally on October 5, 2018, and physically on November 23, 2018, via Still Records, a new record company set up by Dallas himself. Three tracks from the album were released digitally on September 21, 2018, "Casey's Song", "Sensible Heart" and "As Much as I Ever Could". A further three tracks were released a week later on September 21, 2018, "The Girl", "O'Sister" and "Lover Come Back".

In April 2019, City and Colour was the opening act for Alice in Chains' Canadian tour and other three U.S. concerts in support of their album Rainier Fog. Green is a longtime fan of the band and has cited them as one of his early influences. He joined them on stage for a rendition of their song "Nutshell" (a song that Green would often cover) during their concerts at the Budweiser Gardens in London, Ontario on April 23, 2019, and at the FirstOntario Concert Hall in Hamilton on April 24, 2019. He also sang "Got Me Wrong" with the band on April 25 in Rama, on April 27 in Montreal, and on April 28 in Quebec. Alice in Chains' guitarist and vocalist Jerry Cantrell gave one of his guitars to Green after they performed together at the MTELUS in Montreal on April 27, 2019. Green has stated that Cantrell made him fall in love with playing a guitar.

==== A Pill for Loneliness (2019) ====
On June 3, 2019, the band debuted their first new song in four years called "Astronaut" and also announced a 22-date North American tour starting in October 2019. A further single called "Strangers" was released on June 21. On August 15, 2019, the band's album A Pill for Loneliness was announced and at midnight on August 16, a third song, "Living in Lightning", was also released as a single. Green said in a statement about the album, "I wrote a lot of dark songs and wrapped them in the most beautiful sounds we could find, there are personal connotations, but they're also relatable. I'm thankful for the opportunity to create." The album was released on October 4, 2019. In January 2020, the album received a Juno Award nomination for the Adult Alternative Album of the Year.

On June 19, 2020, Dallas released a two track EP of covers from the band Low in support of Bandcamp's 24 hour Juneteenth fundraiser for the NAACP Legal Defense and Educational Fund, with a limited edition 7-inch physical release available to pre-order from his webstore, with those proceeds going to the Black Youth! Pathway 2 Industry project.

==== The Love Still Held Me Near (2023) ====
In an interview from June 2021, Green stated that he had "a whole new record written and demoed" for City and Colour. On January 19, 2023, Green announced the title of his upcoming album, The Love Still Held Me Near, as well as its release date of March 31, 2023.

=== You+Me ===
On September 8, 2014, Green announced a collaboration with Pink. The duo, performing under the name You+Me, released an album titled Rose Ave. on October 14. The album debuted at number one on the Canadian Albums Chart and at number four on the Billboard 200. In an interview from June 2021, Green stated that he had recently written "almost a whole new record" for You+Me.

== Personal life ==
In 2008, Green married Canadian television host Leah Miller in a private ceremony at their home on New Year's Eve.

Green is a supporter of the Toronto Raptors NBA team and the Toronto Blue Jays MLB team.

== Discography ==
=== Studio albums ===
Title	Album details	Peak positions						Sales	Certifications
Title	Album details	CAN	AUS	UK	US	US Heat.	US Indie	Sales	Certifications
Sometimes	Release date: November 1, 2005; Label: Dine Alone, Vagrant	25	—	—	—	—	—		MC: Platinum
Bring Me Your Love	Release date: February 12, 2008; Label: Dine Alone, Vagrant	3	31	—	—	11	35	CAN: 6,000	MC: 2× Platinum
Little Hell	Release date: June 7, 2011; Label: Dine Alone, Vagrant	1	2	43	28	—	7	CAN: 20,000	MC: 2× Platinum; ARIA: Gold
The Hurry and the Harm	Release date: June 4, 2013; Label: Dine Alone, Cooking Vinyl	1	4	32	16	—	—	CAN: 66,000; US: 71,000	MC: Platinum
If I Should Go Before You	Release date: October 9, 2015; Label: Dine Alone, Cooking Vinyl	1	5	47	29	—	—		MC: Gold
A Pill for Loneliness	Release date: October 4, 2019; Label: Still	1	8	—	—	—	8		
The Love Still Held Me Near	Release date: March 31, 2023; Label: Still	12	16	—	—	—	—		
Sometimes Lullaby	Release date: November 28, 2025; Label: Dine Alone	—	—	—	—	—	—		

=== Singles ===
Song	Year	Chart peak			Certifications	Album
Song	Year	CAN	CAN Rock	US AAA	Certifications	Album
"Save Your Scissors"	2005	16	9	—	MC: Platinum	Sometimes
"Comin' Home"	2006	—	34	—	MC: Platinum	Sometimes
"Like Knives"	2007	—	—	—		Live
"Waiting..."	2008	32	20	—		Bring Me Your Love
"Sleeping Sickness"	2008	59	17	—	MC: Platinum	Bring Me Your Love
"The Girl"	2009	—	27	—	MC: Platinum	Bring Me Your Love
"Fragile Bird"	2011	48	5	—	MC: Platinum	Little Hell
"Weightless"	2011	—	15	—		Little Hell
"The Grand Optimist"	2012	85	22	—	MC: Platinum	Little Hell
"Thirst"	2013	51	4	—	MC: Gold	The Hurry and the Harm
"Of Space and Time"	2013	—	—	—		The Hurry and the Harm
"The Lonely Life"	2013	—	15	—		The Hurry and the Harm
"Harder Than Stone"	2014	—	33	—		The Hurry and the Harm
"Nowhere, Texas"	2014	—	—	—		Non-album single
"Woman"	2015	—	—	—		If I Should Go Before You
"Wasted Love"	2015	—	3	28	MC: Gold	If I Should Go Before You
"Lover Come Back"	2015	—	12	8	MC: Gold	If I Should Go Before You
"Runaway"	2016	—	22	—		If I Should Go Before You
"Rain"	2017	—	—	—		Non-album singles
"Peaceful Road"	2017	—	—	—		Non-album singles
"Astronaut"	2019	—	—	—		A Pill for Loneliness
"Strangers"	2019	—	2	—		A Pill for Loneliness
"Living in Lightning"	2019	—	—	—		A Pill for Loneliness
"Difficult Love"	2020	—	17	—		A Pill for Loneliness
"Murderer"	2020	—	—	—		Low Songs
"Sunflower"	2020	—	—	—		Low Songs
"Meant to Be"	2022	—	44	—		The Love Still Held Me Near
"Underground"	2023	—	3	—		The Love Still Held Me Near
"Fucked It Up"	2023	—	—	—		The Love Still Held Me Near
"Hard, Hard Time"	2023	—	14	—		The Love Still Held Me Near
"All the Way Down the Line"	2025	—	—	—		Songs from the Gang
"—" denotes releases that did not chart. "×" denotes periods where charts did not exist or were not archived.

=== Other charted songs ===
List of other charted songs, with selected chart positions, showing year released and album name
Title	Year	Chart peak	Album
Title	Year	CAN	Album
"Boiled Frogs"	2010	64	Live at the Verge
"How Come Your Arms Are Not Around Me"	2012	66	Covers, Pt.2
"Soon Enough"	2012	90	Covers, Pt.2

=== Live albums and EPs ===
Date of release	Title	Label
2004	Simple Songs	N/A
2005	The Death of Me	Dine Alone Records
2005	Missing	Dine Alone Records
2007	Live	Dine Alone Records
2008	Live Session EP (iTunes exclusive)	iTunes exclusive
2008	The MySpace Transmissions	Vagrant Records/Dine Alone Records/MySpace Records
2010	Live at the Verge	Vagrant Records
2010	Live at the Orange Lounge EP	Vagrant Records/Dine Alone Records
2011	iTunes Live: SXSW (Live in Austin, TX/2011)	iTunes exclusive
2012	Europe 2011	Indigo Records
2012	Covers, Pt.2	Dine Alone Records
2013	Covers, Pt.3	Dine Alone Records
2018	Guide Me Back Home	Still Records
2020	Low Songs	Still Records
2026	Covers, Pt. 4	

=== Guest appearances ===
Date of release	Artist	Title	Record label
2001	Raising The Fawn	Selene	N/A
2003	Jude the Obscure	The Coldest Winter	One Day Savior Recordings
2005	Straight Reads the Line	Lets Get Nuts	Verona Records
2005	Neverending White Lights	Act 1: Goodbye Friends of the Heavenly Bodies	Ocean Records Canada / Maple Music Nationwide
2007	The Dear & Departed	Something Quite Peculiar	Science Records
2007	Every Time I Die	The Big Dirty	Ferret Records
2008	Fucked Up	The Chemistry of Common Life	Matador Records
2009	Lights Action	Welcome to the New Cold World	Colt Signals
2009	DL Incognito	Fight This	Crazy Records
2010	Nashville Skyline	Carry You Home – Single	Timber Street Records
2010	Shad & Dallas	Two Songs	Dine Alone Records
2017	Tegan and Sara	The Con X: Covers	Warner Records
2022	Chastity	Suffer Summer	Deathwish Inc.
2022	Geneviève Racette	Satellite	Independent Release
2024	Hot Water Music	Vows	Equal Vision Records

== Filmography ==
=== Television ===
List of television appearances, showing year, title and details
Year	Title	Details
2011	One Tree Hill	Season 8, Episode 15: "Valentine's Day is Over" as himself; cameo appearance

== Awards and nominations ==
Dallas Green awards and nominations
Awards and nominations
Award	Wins	Nominations
Juno	3	12

Totals (Note: Certain award groups do not simply award one winner. They acknowledge several different recipients, have runners-up, and have third place. Since this is a specific recognition and is different from losing an award, runner-up mentions are considered wins in this award tally. For simplification and to avoid errors, each award in this list has been presumed to have had a prior nomination.)
- Wins: 3
- Nominations: 12

2015 SOCAN Awards

- National Achievement Award

Juno Awards

City and Colour has been nominated for twelve Juno Awards and won three.

Year	Award	Result
2007	Alternative Album of the Year for Sometimes	Won
2009	Songwriter of the Year for "Waiting...", "Sleeping Sickness" and "The Girl"	Won
2009	Artist of the Year	Nominated
2012	Songwriter of the Year for "Fragile Bird", "We Found Each Other" and "Weightless"	Won
2012	Artist of the Year	Nominated
2012	Fan Choice Award	Nominated
2012	Single of the Year for "Fragile Bird"	Nominated
2016	Songwriter of the Year for "Blood", "Lover Come Back" and "Wasted Love"	Nominated
2016	Artist of the Year	Nominated
2016	Producer of the Year (Dallas Green) for "Lover Come Back" and "Wasted Love"	Nominated
2020	Adult Alternative Album of the Year for A Pill for Loneliness	Nominated
2024	Album Artwork of the Year for The Love Still Held Me Near	Nominated
