= Forgiveness (disambiguation) =

Forgiveness is the process of waiving any negative feeling or desire for punishment.

Forgiveness, Forgiven, Forgiving or Forgive may also refer to:

- Forgiveness Day or Kshamavani, the annual day of forgiveness in Jainism

== Film and TV ==
- "Forgiving" (Angel), a 2002 episode of Angel
- Forgiveness (2004 film), a South African film
- Forgiven (2006 film), a film directed by Paul Fitzgerald
- Forgiven (2007 film), a British TV film directed by Paul Wilmshurst
- Forgiveness (2008 film), an American dramatic Holocaust film
- Forgiven (2011 film), see List of Western films of the 2010s
- "Forgive" (The Following), a 2014 episode of The Following
- The Forgiven (2017 film), a British drama
- Forgiveness (2021 film), a Mexican-American experimental horror film
- The Forgiven (2021 film), directed by John Michael McDonagh, based on the 2012 novel
- "The Forgiven", a 2025 episode of the TV series Pocoyo.

== Music ==
=== Forgive ===
- Forgive (album), a 2002 album by Rebecca Lynn Howard
  - "Forgive" (song), this album's title track

=== Forgiven ===
- Forgiven (album), a 2008 album by Los Lonely Boys
- "Forgiven" (Disturbed song), 2005
- "Forgiven" (Relient K song), 2006
- "Forgiven" (Sanctus Real song), 2009
- "Forgiven" (Within Temptation song), 2008
- "Forgiven" (Skillet song), 2009
- "Forgiven" (Sylver song), 2001
- "Forgiven", by Alanis Morissette from Jagged Little Pill, 1995
- "Forgiven", by Echo & the Bunnymen from Evergreen, 1997
- "Forgiven", by Jonatha Brooke from Careful What You Wish For, 2007

=== Forgiveness ===
- Forgiveness (album), a 2003 album by Jim Witter
- "Forgiveness" (Ayumi Hamasaki song), 2003
- "Forgiveness" (Wretch 32 song), 2011
- "Forgiveness" (Matthew West song), 2012
- "Forgiveness" (Nicky Jam song), the English version of "El Perdón" by Nicky Jam and Enrique Iglesias, 2015
- "Forgiveness" (Alice Glass song), 2018
- "Forgiveness", by Engineers from Engineers, 2005
- "Forgiveness", by Leona Lewis from Spirit, 2008
- "Forgiveness", by Paramore from After Laughter, 2017

== Other ==
- The Forgiven (novel), a 2012 psychological thriller by Lawrence Osborne
- Forg1ven (born 1992), Greek professional League of Legends player
