= Live (City and Colour album) =

Live album by City and Colour
- Released: March 6, 2007
- Recorded: March 2006
- Genre: Acoustic
- Length: 59:20
- Label: Dine Alone
- Producer: Bedlam Music Management

City and Colour chronology
Sometimes (2005)	Live (2007)	Bring Me Your Love (2008)

Singles from Live
- 1. "Like Knives" Released: 2007

Live is a live CD/DVD set from City and Colour, side project of Dallas Green, one of the vocalists and guitarists of the band Alexisonfire. It was released on March 6, 2007. A limited edition has also been released at the same time. It included a USB key with footage from MMVA and Much on Demand performances.

== Track list ==
All tracks are written by Dallas Green, except where noted

No.	Title	Length
1.	"Forgive Me" (Previously unreleased)	2:29
2.	"Comin' Home"	4:36
3.	"Like Knives"	4:22
4.	"Sam Malone"	4:57
5.	"Day Old Hate"	6:28
6.	"Confessions" (Previously unreleased)	4:21
7.	"Save Your Scissors"	4:36
8.	"Casey's Song" (Dallas Green, Casey Baker)	3:18
9.	"Sometimes (I Wish)"	6:02
10.	"Happiness by the Kilowatt" (Alexisonfire cover)	4:57

Bonus tracks
No.	Title	Length
11.	"Comin' Home" (Alternate performance)	4:47
12.	"Save Your Scissors" (Alternate performance)	4:26
13.	"Sensible Heart" (Previously unreleased)	4:07

== DVD listing ==
1. Forgive Me
2. Comin' Home
3. Like Knives
4. Sam Malone
5. Day Old Hate
6. Confessions
7. Save Your Scissors
8. Casey's Song
9. Sometimes (I Wish)
10. Happiness by the Kilowatt

=== Bonus material ===
- Forgive Me (Malkin Bowl, Vancouver)
- Hello, I'm in Delaware (Malkin Bowl, Vancouver)
- Comin' Home (Malkin Bowl, Vancouver)
- Wastin' Time (Halifax Club with Ron Sexsmith)
