= Two Coins =

Two Coins may refer to:

- "Two Coins" (The Unit), an episode of the television series The Unit
- A song by Dispatch
- A song by City and Colour from the 2013 album The Hurry and the Harm
