= Welcome to the New World =

Welcome to the New World may refer to:

- Welcome to the New World, a 2004 album by The Captains
- Welcome to the New World, a 2009 album by Tay Dizm

It may also refer to:

- Welcome to the New Cold World, a 2009 album by Lights Action
