= No Rules (Rebecca Lynn Howard album) =

Studio album by Rebecca Lynn Howard
- Released: June 17, 2008
- Genre: Country
- Label: Saguaro Road
- Producer: Michael Curtis

Rebecca Lynn Howard chronology
Forgive (2002)	No Rules (2008)	I'm Not Who You Think I Am (2025)

Singles from Forgive
- 1. "What Dying Feels Like" Released: May 20, 2008

Professional ratings
Review scores
Source	Rating
Allmusic	link
Roughstock	favorable link

No Rules is the third studio album released by American country music artist Rebecca Lynn Howard. It is her first full studio album in six years, as she recorded two unreleased albums in the interim: one in 2003 for MCA Nashville, and another in 2005 for Arista Nashville. The album features strong southern soul influences. It includes covers of Aretha Franklin's 1967 single "Do Right Woman, Do Right Man", The Temptations' 1975 single "Shakey Ground", and "We're in This Love Together", originally by Al Jarreau. The album reached number 69 on the Billboard Top Country Albums chart. "What Dying Feels Like" was released as a single in May 2008, but failed to chart.

== Track listing ==
1. "Shakey Ground" (Al Boyd, Eddie Hazel, Jeffrey Bowen) – 3:42
2. "New Twist on an Old Groove" (Michael Curtis, Rebecca Lynn Howard) – 3:48
3. "Do Right Woman, Do Right Man" (Chips Moman, Dan Penn) – 3:22
4. "Soul Sisters" (Howard, Will McFarlane, Michael Curtis) – 3:35
5. "What Dying Feels Like" (Howard, Rachel Thibodeau) – 4:22
6. "Better Someday" (Howard) – 3:54
7. "Just Let It Burn" (Howard, Thibodeau, Robin Lee Bruce) – 2:48
8. "As One as Two Can Be" (Howard, Patrick Jason Matthews) – 4:12
9. "Sing 'Cause I Love To" (Howard, Radney Foster) – 4:20
10. "Real Love" (Howard, Curtis, Teddy Gentry) – 4:01
11. "I'm Over You" (Howard, Thibodeau) – 4:03
12. "The Life of a Dollar" (Howard, Thibodeau) – 3:20
13. "We're in This Love Together" (Roger Murrah, Keith Stegall) – 3:17
14. "Throw It Down" (Kree Harrison, Howard) – 2:51

== Chart performance ==
Chart (2008)	Peak position
U.S. Billboard Top Country Albums	69
