= Sometimes (City and Colour album) =

Studio album by City and Colour
- Released: November 1, 2005
- Recorded: 2004–2005
- Genre: Acoustic, folk
- Length: 44:37
- Label: Dine Alone
- Producer: Dallas Green; Julius Butty

City and Colour chronology
Missing (2004)	Sometimes (2005)	Live (2007)

Singles from Sometimes
- 1. "Save Your Scissors" Released: 2005; 2. "Comin' Home" Released: 2006

Professional ratings
Review scores
Source	Rating
Punknews.org	3.5/5 stars
Melodic	4/5 stars

Sometimes is the debut solo album by City and Colour, a side project of Dallas Green, a guitarist and singer for the band Alexisonfire. At first, the majority of these songs were only available at live shows or over the Internet through Peer-to-peer services. However, due to high demand, the songs were compiled onto a studio album and released through Dine Alone Records. "Comin' Home" was the only song on the album to not have been previously available. The album was awarded Alternative Album of the Year at the 2007 Juno Awards.

Sometimes was re-released on Vagrant Records on January 13, 2009, which was first time the album was available in physical form in the US.

Despite the album's relatively limited initial commercial success, it received widespread critical acclaim in its native Canada where it was certified gold in March 2006.

== Background ==
Sometimes was co-produced by Green and Julius Butty; Butty engineered most of the songs, while four of them were engineered by Larry Thompson at Green's friend's house. Butty mixed the album before it was mastered by Brett Zilhali at Joao Carvalho Mastering.

== Track listing ==
Track listing per booklet.

No.	Title	Length
1.	"....Off by Heart"	1:51
2.	"Like Knives"	4:30
3.	"Hello, I'm in Delaware"	5:45
4.	"Save Your Scissors"	4:48
5.	"In the Water I Am Beautiful"	2:47
6.	"Day Old Hate"	6:44
7.	"Sam Malone"	4:51
8.	"Comin' Home"	5:05
9.	"Casey's Song"	3:27
10.	"Sometimes (I Wish)"	6:00
Total length:		44:37

== Personnel ==
Personnel per booklet.

City and Colour

- Dallas Green – vocals, guitar

Production

- Dallas Green – co-producer
- Julius Butty – co-producer, engineer (tracks 2–4, 6, 9 and 10), mixing
- Larry Thompson – engineer (tracks 1, 5, 7 and 8)
- Brett Zilhali – mastering
- Garnet – art direction, design
- Scott McEwan – tattoo artist

== Allusions ==
- "Sam Malone" was one of the first songs Green wrote as a teenager. Sam Malone is the name of the bartender in the TV show Cheers.
- "In the Water I Am Beautiful" is a quote from the preface of Welcome to the Monkey House by Kurt Vonnegut Jr.
- "Hello, I'm in Delaware" is a line from the 1992 film Wayne's World starring fellow Canadian Mike Myers.
- "Sam Malone" has several lines taken from the Alexisonfire song, "Where No One Knows" from their self-titled debut.
