= Strangers (City and Colour song) =

2019 single by City and Colour

Single by City and Colour

from the album A Pill for Loneliness
- Released: 21 June 2019
- Length: 4:04
- Label: Still Records
- Songwriter: Dallas Green
- Producer: Jacquire King

City and Colour singles chronology
"Astronaut" (2019)	"Strangers" (2019)	"Living In Lightning" (2019)

Music video
- Strangers on YouTube; Strangers (Lyric Video) on YouTube

"Strangers" is a single released by Canadian artist City and Colour on 21 June 2019, the second single released from A Pill for Loneliness. In a statement for the song, Dallas Green has said, "You’ll never really understand what it’s like to be inside someone else’s brain or heart. So, we need to appreciate the differences. If we do, maybe we can live better with one another."

The music video was released on 8 August 2019, co-directed by Chris Verene and Michael Maxxis, who Green had previously collaborated with on Alexisonfire's video for Familiar Drugs.

== Credits and personnel ==
Credits are adapted from iTunes.

- Dallas Green – lead vocals, electric guitar, acoustic guitar, background vocals, songwriter
- Jacquire King – programming, producer, mixing engineer
- Matt Kelly – keyboards, background vocals
- Jack Lawrence – bass guitar
- Gemma Mazza – piano
- Leon Power – drums
- Spencer Thomson – programming, keyboards, acoustic guitar

== Chart performance ==
Chart (2019)	Peak position
Canada Rock (Billboard)	2

== Release history ==
Release history for "Strangers"
Region	Date	Format(s)	Label	Ref.
Various	21 June 2019	Digital download; streaming	Still Records	
United States	8 July 2019	Adult album alternative radio	Dine Alone Records	
