= Loving Mary =

American country band (2014–2017)

- Origin: USA
- Genres: Country, Americana and rock n' roll
- Years active: 2014–2017
- Past members: Marti Frederiksen; Suzie McNeil; Rebecca Lynn Howard; Elisha Hoffman; Andrew Mactaggart; Sarah Tomek
- Website: www.lovingmaryband.com

Loving Mary was an American band. The group's sound has been described as a combination of Americana, country, and rock n' roll.

In 2013, Suzie McNeil began working on a duo project with previous songwriting collaborator Marti Frederiksen, which was reportedly intended to follow in the style of American country trio Lady Antebellum. Instead, in 2014 the two teamed up with Grammy-winning country singer Rebecca Lynn Howard and Andrew Mactaggart, Sarah Tomek and husband, songwriter Elisha Hoffman to form the band Loving Mary, which they envisioned as a sort of modern-day Fleetwood Mac.

An EP, Loving Mary – Live, was recorded and released in early 2015, Loving Mary released its debut album Little Bit of Love in 2016.

== Touring ==
The group joined Aerosmith's Steven Tyler as backup band on his debut country solo studio album We're All Somebody from Somewhere and its supporting "Out On A Limb" tour in the U.S. and Japan. The band has made numerous appearances with Tyler on the festival circuit, including WE Fest and The Pilgrimage Music Festival, as well as on The Tonight Show Starring Jimmy Fallon, The Ellen DeGeneres Show, and The TODAY Show.

In 2017, Loving Mary joined Gretchen Wilson on a multi-city tour in support of her album Ready to Get Rowdy.

== Discography ==
=== Albums ===
- 2016: Little Bit of Love

=== EPs ===
- 2015: Loving Mary – Live
