= Fragile Bird =

Single by City and Colour

from the album Little Hell
- Released: April 5, 2011
- Recorded: January – February 2011 at Catherine North Studios, Hamilton, Ontario, Canada
- Genre: Alternative rock
- Length: 4:17; 4:07 (Radio edit)
- Label: Dine Alone
- Songwriter(s): Dallas Green
- Producer(s): Alex Newport

City and Colour singles chronology
"Boiled Frogs" (2010)	"Fragile Bird" (2011)	"Weightless" (2011)

Music video
- "Fragile Bird" on YouTube

"Fragile Bird" is the first single from City and Colour's third studio album, Little Hell. The song spent 1 week on the Canadian Hot 100 at No. 48 and was No. 1 on the Canadian alternative rock chart for 9 weeks.

== Charts ==
Chart (2011)	Peak position
Canadian Hot 100	48

== Popular culture ==
=== Sports ===
The song was used for Hockey Night in Canada's intro for game seven of the 2011 Stanley Cup Finals between the Vancouver Canucks and Boston Bruins.
