= I Don't Paint Myself into Corners =

Single by Rebecca Lynn Howard

from the album Rebecca Lynn Howard
- B-side: "Was It as Hard to Be Together"
- Released: August 2000
- Recorded: December 1999
- Studio: Javelina (Nashville, Tennessee)
- Genre: Country; contemporary country
- Length: 4:58
- Label: MCA Nashville
- Songwriter(s): Trey Bruce; Rebecca Lynn Howard
- Producer(s): Mark Wright

Rebecca Lynn Howard singles chronology
"Out Here in the Water" (2000)	"I Don't Paint Myself into Corners" (2000)	"Forgive" (2001)

"I Don't Paint Myself into Corners" is a song written by Trey Bruce and Rebecca Lynn Howard. It was recorded for Howard's self-titled debut album and released as a single in 2000. The song reached a position on the Billboard country chart that same year. It would notably be covered by Trisha Yearwood in 2001 for her studio album, Inside Out. In 2002, it was also released as a single by Yearwood and also became a charting Billboard country hit.

== Background ==
"I Don't Paint Myself into Corners" was first composed by songwriter Trey Bruce and Rebecca Lynn Howard. It was recorded in December 1999 at the Javelina Recording Studio, located in Nashville, Tennessee. The session was produced by Mark Wright. Howard and Wright also recorded several additional tracks for her debut studio album. Her self-titled debut studio album was released on May 2, 2000 via MCA Nashville Records. It was formally released as a single in August 2000 via MCA Nashville. It was the third single spawned from Howard's debut album.

== Release and reception ==
Following its single release, "I Don't Paint Myself into Corners" entered the Billboard Hot Country Songs chart, peaking at number 71 in September 2000 after spending only four weeks on the list. It was Howard's third charting single on Billboard's country chart in her career. In addition, "I Don't Paint Myself into Corners" peaked at number 58 on the Canadian RPM Country Songs chart in 2000. It was Howard's final charting single with the record publication. In addition to charting, the single was reviewed by Billboard magazine following its release. Writers praised her singing and writing on the track, commenting that it "perfectly demonstrates both her vocal gift and song-crafting ability." They also called the song's production to be "stone cold country with fiddle and weeping steel guitar."

== Track listing ==
CD single

- "I Don't Paint Myself into Corners" – 4:58
- "Was It as Hard to Be Together" – 3:44

== Charts ==
Chart (2000)	Peak position
Canada Country Songs (RPM)	58
US Hot Country Songs (Billboard)	71

== Trisha Yearwood version ==
"I Don't Paint Myself into Corners"

Single by Trisha Yearwood

from the album Inside Out
- Released: July 1, 2002
- Recorded: 2001
- Studio: The Sound Kitchen
- Genre: Country; contemporary country
- Length: 4:11
- Label: MCA Nashville
- Songwriter(s): Trey Bruce; Rebecca Lynn Howard
- Producer(s): Mark Wright; Trisha Yearwood

Trisha Yearwood singles chronology
"Squeeze Me In" (2002)	"I Don't Paint Myself into Corners" (2002)	"Georgia Rain" (2005)

=== Background ===
In 2001, American country artist Trisha Yearwood recorded "I Don't Paint Myself into Corners." The session for the album was produced by Mark Wright, along with Yearwood co-producing herself. Wright had previously recorded the song with its original performer. The session was among Yearwood's only production collaborations with Wright in her career. Yearwood's version of the song included harmony vocals from Vince Gill, who went uncredited on the single's release. The session was produced at the Sound Kitchen, a studio located in Nashville, Tennessee. Additional tracks were recorded during the same session that later appeared on Yearwood's 2001 album.

=== Release and reception ===
In mid 2002, "I Don't Paint Myself into Corners" was released as a single by Yearwood via MCA Nashville Records. It was the third single spawned from her 2001 studio album, Inside Out. The album was released a year prior in June 2002 also on the MCA label. Yearwood's version of the song spent six weeks on the Billboard Hot Country Songs chart and peaked at number 47 in July 2002. Yearwood's version of the song also received positive reviews from critics. Maria Konicki Dinoia of Allmusic called the song as "blazing". Shortly after the release of Inside Out, Billboard magazine gave the song a positive response also, calling it "a powerhouse country ballad."

=== Track listing ===
CD single

- "I Don't Paint Myself into Corners" – 4:11

=== Charts ===
Chart (2002)	Peak position
US Hot Country Songs (Billboard)	47
