= Aurora (Lights Action song) =

Single by Lights.Action!
- Released: 23 March 2008
- Recorded: 2008
- Genre: Rock
- Length: 3:34
- Label: Xtra Mile
- Songwriter(s): Lights Action

Lights.Action! singles chronology
"Story of a Broken Boy" (2007)	"Aurora" (2008)	"Battle of Lovers" (2009)

"Aurora" is the third single released by British quintet Lights.Action!. It was released on 7 April, before their debut mini-album, All Eyes to the Morning Sun, through iTunes and other major DSPs.

The song is based on a poem written by Patrick Currier, which is a letter to his imaginary future daughter, Aurora, who is confronted with the end of the world. He imagines speaking to her and soothing her despite the fact that the skies are filled with exploding bombs, and the world is being torn apart. He tries to put it across that the explosions are just a lightshow for her, like the Northern Lights, her namesake.

== Music video ==
The video was filmed in a field in Surrey on a cold night. The idea behind it is that the band are trying to put the sun back in the sky.

== Personnel ==
Patrick Currier – vocals
Karl Bareham – Guitar
Chris Moorhead – Guitar/Keys
Alex Leeder – Bass
Steven Durham – drums

George Fafalios – Director, Editing
Hannah Clayton – Costume
Mark Fafalios, Lewis Jones – Gaffer.
