= Rebecca Lynn Howard (album) =

Studio album by Rebecca Lynn Howard
- Released: May 2, 2000
- Recorded: 1999
- Studio: Javelina (Nashville, Tennessee)
- Genre: Country
- Length: 42:14
- Label: MCA Nashville
- Producer: Mark Wright

Rebecca Lynn Howard chronology
Rebecca Lynn Howard (2000)	Forgive (2002)

Singles from Rebecca Lynn Howard
- 1. "When My Dreams Come True" Released: June 28, 1999; 2. "Out Here in the Water" Released: February 7, 2000; 3. "I Don't Paint Myself into Corners" Released: August 21, 2000

Rebecca Lynn Howard (originally titled When My Dreams Come True) is the debut studio album by American country music singer-songwriter Rebecca Lynn Howard, released May 2, 2000 via MCA Nashville. Before this, she had recorded an entire full-length album under the Rising Tide Nashville label, which went unreleased due to the label's bankruptcy. She then went to Decca Nashville, which also closed. In early 1999, she would get a deal with MCA Nashville Records, a deal which would last until 2004 when she left the label following yet another unreleased album. The album was initially planned to be released on September 7, 1999.

Unusual for a debut artist at the time, Howard co-wrote all but two tracks on the album. The record was produced by Mark Wright. Rebecca Lynn Howard received a positive reception from music critics, with praise going towards Howard's vocals and songwriting. Three official singles were released, none of which became successful. The highest-charting, "Out Here in the Water", only peaked at number 54 on the US Hot Country Songs chart. "I Don't Paint Myself into Corners" and "Melancholy Blue" would be recorded by label-mate Trisha Yearwood on her 2001 studio album Inside Out, with the former becoming a charting single for her in 2002. The album would reach a minute peak of number 54 on the Top Country Albums chart.

== Critical reception ==
Professional ratings
Review scores
Source	Rating
Allmusic	3/5 stars

Rebecca Lynn Howard received a mostly favorable reception from music critics. In a mixed review for AllMusic, Philip Van Vleck criticized the album's more pop-sounding songs and some of Howard's writing while praising "Was It as Hard to Be Together" as being the "only genuine country ballad" on the album. Phyllis Stark of Billboard gave the album a positive review, noting how at times Howard's vibrato is reminiscent of Dolly Parton.

== Commercial performance ==
Rebecca Lynn Howard debuted and peaked at number 54 on the US Top Country Albums chart with 2,500 copies sold first week. It spent only one week before falling off.

== Track listing ==
Rebecca Lynn Howard track listing
No.	Title	Writer(s)	Length
1.	"Heartsounds"	Rebecca Lynn Howard; Marty Dodson	3:19
2.	"I Don't Paint Myself into Corners"	R. Howard; Trey Bruce	4:59
3.	"Out Here in the Water"	R. Howard; T. Bruce; Robin Lee Bruce	3:26
4.	"Melancholy Blue"	Tom Douglas; Harlan Howard	3:38
5.	"You're Real"	R. Howard; Dodson	3:46
6.	"Was It as Hard to Be Together"	R. Howard; Carl Jackson	3:46
7.	"Move Me"	R. Howard; Dodson	2:46
8.	"You're Not a Memory Yet"	R. Howard; Melba Montgomery; Jerry Salley	3:22
9.	"Believe It or Not"	R. Howard; Dodson; Ron Harbin	3:47
10.	"When My Dreams Come True"	T. Bruce; J.D. Martin	3:16
11.	"Jesus, Daddy and You"	R. Howard; Dodson; Kim Williams	3:54
12.	"Tennessee in My Windshield"	R. Howard; Williams	2:15
Total length:			42:14

== Personnel ==
Compiled from liner notes.

=== Musicians ===
- Rebecca Lynn Howard — lead vocals
- Robin Lee Bruce — background vocals
- Mark Casstevens, Dan Dugmore, Biff Watson — acoustic guitar
- Chad Cromwell, Shannon Forrest, Greg Morrow — drums
- Steve Cropper — electric guitar
- Eric Darken — percussion
- Stuart Duncan, Larry Franklin — fiddle
- Paul Franklin — steel guitar
- Wes Hightower — background vocals
- Jim Horn — saxophone
- Rebecca Lynn Howard — vocals
- David Hungate, Michael Rhodes — bass guitar
- Kirk "Jellyroll" Johnson — harmonica
- Marilyn Martin — background vocals
- Brent Mason, Brent Rowan — acoustic guitar, electric guitar
- Buddy Miller — background vocals
- Steve Nathan — piano, keyboards

String section on "Melancholy Blue": Kristin Wilkinson, John Catchings, Donald Christian Teal, David Davidson

String section on "Believe It or Not": The Nashville String Machine

=== Technical ===
- David Campbell — string arrangements on "Believe It or Not", conductor
- Greg Droman — associate producer, engineering, mixing
- Kristin Wilkinson — string arrangements on "Melancholy Blue"
- Hank Williams — mastering
- Mark Wright — production

== Charts ==
Chart (2000)	Peak position
US Top Country Albums (Billboard)	54
