= Little Hell (album) =

Studio album by City and Colour
- Released: June 7, 2011
- Recorded: January – February 2011
- Studio: Catherine North Studios, Hamilton, Ontario, Canada
- Genre: Indie rock; alternative rock; folk; alternative country; blues
- Length: 47:27
- Label: Dine Alone, Vagrant
- Producer: Alex Newport

City and Colour chronology
Bring Me Your Love (2008)	Little Hell (2011)	The Hurry and the Harm (2013)

Singles from Little Hell
- 1. "Fragile Bird" Released: April 5, 2011; 2. "Weightless" Released: 2011; 3. "The Grand Optimist" Released: 2012

Professional ratings
Aggregate scores
Source	Rating
Metacritic	78/100
Review scores
Source	Rating
AbsolutePunk	86%
AllMusic	4/5 stars
Blare	3.5/5 stars
Rock Sound	8/10
Spin	7/10

Little Hell is the third album by City and Colour, released on June 7, 2011. Besides Dallas Green who recorded the majority of the instrumentals himself, contributing musicians on the record include Daniel Romano of Attack in Black, Dylan Green and Scott Remila of Raising the Fawn, Nick Skalkos of The Miniatures, Misha Bower of Bruce Peninsula and Anna Jarvis and Jordan Mitchell of The Rest. The album art is an illustration of Allard Schager's photograph "Fields of Gold", taken in a tulip field outside Alkmaar in North Holland.

The album received generally positive reviews from music critics. At Metacritic, which assigns a normalized rating out of 100 to reviews from mainstream critics, the album received an average score of 78, based on 11 reviews, which indicates "generally favorable reviews". The track "Sorrowing Man" was used as the opening theme song of the Thandiwe Newton series Rogue during its second season, and was also used in the One Tree Hill ninth-season episode, "A Rush of Blood to the Head". Album cover art work inspired by the 1976 film Futureworld. In the film once the cast enters the simulation the art work hanging on the wall at the 27:53 time stamp can be seen however not identical to the album cover the inspiration is revealed.

== Promotion and release ==
Green began performing the songs "O' Sister" and "Silver and Gold" live on his Canadian tour in September 2009, while most of the album was already written, although it was not recorded until January 2011. Although "O' Sister" had been confirmed by Green to be the first single, "Fragile Bird" was released instead, on April 5, 2011. The music video of "Fragile Bird" was premiered on Dallas' YouTube channel on May 26, 2011. On February 23, 2011, Green revealed the album's name as Little Hell. On March 23, 2011, Green revealed the album's track listing and release date on his MySpace blog. On May 31, 2011, a week before the release, the album was streamed for free through the websites of MTV and MuchMusic for Canadian residents. The album debuted at number 1 on the Canadian Albums Chart, selling over 20,000 copies in its first week, and at number 28 on the US Billboard 200.

== Track listing ==
All tracks are written by Dallas Green.

No.	Title	Length
1.	"We Found Each Other in the Dark"	4:22
2.	"Natural Disaster"	3:50
3.	"The Grand Optimist"	4:05
4.	"Little Hell"	4:43
5.	"Fragile Bird"	4:17
6.	"Northern Wind"	4:16
7.	"O' Sister"	4:16
8.	"Weightless"	3:32
9.	"Sorrowing Man"	4:32
10.	"Silver and Gold"	4:40
11.	"Hope for Now"	4:57

iTunes bonus tracks
No.	Title	Length
12.	"Weightless" (Demo)	2:11
13.	"O' Sister" (Live)	4:05
14.	"At the Bird's Foot" (Vocal)	4:15

== Personnel ==
=== City and Colour ===
- Dallas Green – vocals, guitar, piano
- Daniel Romano – guitars, bass guitar, harmonies, pedal steel, organ, piano
- Dylan Green – drums, percussion
- Scott Remila – bass guitar, harmonies

=== Additional musicians ===
- Nick Skalkos – drums on "Fragile Bird" and "Weightless"
- Misha Bower – harmonies on "Weightless"
- Anna Jarvis – cello on "Northern Wind" and "Silver and Gold"

== Charts ==
=== Weekly charts ===
Chart (2011)	Peak position
Australian Albums (ARIA)	2
Canadian Albums (Billboard)	1
Scottish Albums (OCC)	45
UK Albums (OCC)	47
US Billboard 200	28
US Top Alternative Albums (Billboard)	9
US Independent Albums (Billboard)	7
US Top Rock Albums (Billboard)	11

=== Year-end charts ===
Chart (2011)	Position
Canadian Albums (Billboard)	40

== Certifications ==
Region	Certification	Certified units/sales
Australia (ARIA)	Gold	35,000^{^}
Canada (Music Canada)	2× Platinum	160,000^{‡}
^{^} Shipments figures based on certification alone.^{‡} Sales+streaming figures based on certification alone.
