= If I Should Go Before You =

Studio album by City and Colour
- Released: October 9, 2015
- Genre: Alternative rock; indie rock; blues rock; country rock; folk rock
- Length: 50:54
- Label: Dine Alone
- Producer: Dallas Green

City and Colour chronology
The Hurry and the Harm (2013)	If I Should Go Before You (2015)	A Pill for Loneliness (2019)

Singles from If I Should Go Before You
- 1. "Woman" Released: July 14, 2015; 2. "Wasted Love" Released: August 2015; 3. "Lover Come Back" Released: September 2015; 4. "Runaway"

Professional ratings
Aggregate scores
Source	Rating
Metacritic	75/100
Review scores
Source	Rating
AllMusic	4/5 stars
Exclaim!	8/10
Kerrang!	4/5 stars
Mojo	3/5 stars

If I Should Go Before You is the fifth studio album by City and Colour. It was released on October 9, 2015, through Dine Alone Records. The release was City and Colour's third consecutive studio album to reach No. 1 on the Canadian Albums Chart.

== Reception ==
The album received very positive reviews upon release, with some believing it may be Green's best album to date. The album also did well commercially, becoming the band's first number one album on the Canadian iTunes Store. The album was nominated for several Juno Awards, including an Artist of the Year nomination for Green, as well as nominations for the songwriting on "Blood", "Lover Come Back", and "Wasted Love".

== Track listing ==
All tracks are written by Dallas Green.

No.	Title	Length
1.	"Woman"	9:16
2.	"Northern Blues"	4:50
3.	"Mizzy C"	3:59
4.	"If I Should Go Before You"	4:16
5.	"Killing Time"	4:21
6.	"Wasted Love"	2:58
7.	"Runaway"	4:14
8.	"Lover Come Back"	3:54
9.	"Map of the World"	2:52
10.	"Friends"	4:58
11.	"Blood"	5:16

== Personnel ==
Musicians

- Dallas Green – vocals, guitar, congas (2)
- Dante Schwebel – guitar
- Doug MacGregor – drums, percussion
- Jack Lawrence – bass guitar
- Matt Kelly – pedal steel, keyboards, trumpet
- Alysse Gafkjen – backing vocals (4)
- Mark Watrous – violin (11)
- Leah Miller Green – backing vocals (11)
- Karl Bareham – electric guitar and keyboards (11)

Technical personnel

- Dallas Green – producer
- Karl "Horse" Bareham – engineer, co-producer
- Jason Mott – assistant engineer
- Erik P. H. Nielsen – additional engineering (9, 11)
- Luke Shindler – assistant engineer (9)
- Jacquire King – mixing
- Lowell Reynolds – mix engineer
- Kolton Lee – mix assistant
- Richard Dodd – mastering

== Charts ==
Chart (2015)	Peak position
Australian Albums (ARIA)	5
Canadian Albums (Billboard)	1
UK Albums (OCC)	47
US Billboard 200	29
