= The Love Still Held Me Near =

Studio album by City and Colour
- Released: 31 March 2023
- Genres: Alternative rock, indie rock, folk rock
- Length: 58:51
- Label: Still Records
- Producers: Dallas Green, Matt Kelly

City and Colour chronology
A Pill for Loneliness (2019)	The Love Still Held Me Near (2023)

Singles from The Love Still Held Me Near
- 1. "Underground" Released: 19 January 2023; 2. "Fucked It Up" Released: 24 February 2023; 3. "Hard, Hard Time" Released: 2023

Professional ratings
Aggregate scores
Source	Rating
Metacritic	69/100
Review scores
Source	Rating
American Songwriter	4/5 stars
Exclaim!	8/10
Kerrang!	3/5 stars

The Love Still Held Me Near is the seventh studio album by Canadian musician City and Colour. It was released on 31 March 2023 through frontman Dallas Green's own record label, Still Records. The lead single, "Underground", was released on 19 January 2023, with the album being officially announced the same day.

The album is a Juno Award nominee for Album Artwork of the Year at the Juno Awards of 2024.

== Track listing ==
All tracks are written by Dallas Green, except "Without Warning", written by Dallas Green and Matt Kelly.

No.	Title	Length
1.	"Meant to Be"	4:18
2.	"Underground"	3:57
3.	"Fucked It Up"	3:59
4.	"The Love Still Held Me Near"	5:23
5.	"A Little Mercy"	5:51
6.	"Things We Choose to Care About"	4:37
7.	"After Disaster"	5:25
8.	"Without Warning"	5:21
9.	"Hard, Hard Time"	4:16
10.	"The Water Is Coming"	6:02
11.	"Bow Down to Love"	6:10
12.	"Begin Again"	3:32

== Personnel ==
Musicians

- Dallas Green – vocals, guitar
- Matt Kelly – Wurlitzer (5, 7, 8, 11), organ (2, 8), synthesizer (4), guitar (1–3, 6, 9, 10, 12), background vocals (1–3, 10–12)
- Leon Power – drums (1–5, 7–11), percussion (2–6, 8–10, 12), background vocals (10)
- John Sponarski – guitar, background vocals (9)
- Erik Nielsen – bass, background vocals (9)

Technical and artistic personnel

- Darren "Jeter" Magierowski – engineer
- Jill Zimmermann – engineer
- Jacquire King – mixing
- Danny Pellegrini – assistant mix engineer
- Pete Lyman – mastering
- Kit King – paintings
- Vanessa Heins – photography
- Nick Steinhardt – art direction and design

== Charts ==
Chart (2023)	Peak position
Australian Albums (ARIA)	16
Canadian Albums (Billboard)	12
