= Lights Action =

British rock group

Lights Action (formerly Lights. Action!)
- Origin: London, England, United Kingdom
- Genres: Rock; Indie; Alternative
- Labels: Xtra Mile, Colt Signals
- Members: Patrick Currier; Karl Bareham; Chris Moorhead; Alex Leeder; Steven Durham
- Website: MySpace

Lights Action were a British rock quintet from London/Oxford/Chelmsford made up of Patrick Currier (vocals), Karl Bareham (guitar), Chris Moorhead (guitar/keyboards), Alex Leeder (bass) and Steven Durham (drums). The band broke up in 2011.

== Initial releases ==
Their first single, "Satellites", was released on 7 May 2007. The single was re-released as a limited edition double A-Side single at the end of April 2008, backed with the song "Us Against the World". Their second single, "Story Of A Broken Boy", was released on 1 October 2007. Lights Action's third single, "Aurora" was released on 7 April 2008.

Their début mini-album All Eyes to the Morning Sun, was released in April through Xtra Mile Recordings.

== Debut album ==
Their début album Welcome to the New Cold World was released on 2 March 2009 through the band's own, "Colt Signals" label. Unlike the preceding synth-driven mini-album, the album used instruments such as piano, lap steel, hammond organ, pipe organ, mellotron and a live string quartet. Reviews compared their epic style to that of Arcade Fire, Coldplay and U2.

The first album single to be released was "Battle of Lovers", which was given away as a free download through the band's website.

The final song on the album, "The Bottom of the Sea" featured a choir including Dallas Green (Alexisonfire/City and Colour), Kenny Bridges (Moneen), singer/songwriter Richard Walters and Oxford based band, A Silent Film.

== Discography ==
=== Singles ===
Date	Single	Album
7 May 2007	"Satellites"	-
1 October 2007	"Story Of A Broken Boy"	-
7 April 2008	"Aurora"	-
18 February 2009	"Battle Of Lovers"	Welcome to the New Cold World

=== Mini albums ===
Date	Album
14 April 2008	All Eyes to the Morning Sun
TBA 2009/10	Sons of the Sea EP

=== Albums ===
Date	Album
2 March 2009	Welcome to the New Cold World

== Band members ==
- Patrick Currier - Vocals
- Karl Bareham - Guitar
- Chris Moorhead - Guitar/Keys
- Alex Leeder - Bass
- Steven Durham - Drums
