= Difficult Love =

Song by City and Colour

from the album A Pill for Loneliness
- Genre: Alternative
- Length: 4:04
- Label: Still Records
- Songwriter: Dallas Green
- Producer: Jacquire King

City and Colour singles chronology
"Living In Lightning" (2019)	"Difficult Love" (2020)

"Difficult Love" is a song by Canadian artist City and Colour, from his sixth studio album A Pill for Loneliness. The song peaked at number 17 on the Canadian Rock Billboard chart.

== Chart performance ==
Chart (2020)	Peak position
Canada Rock	17
