= All Eyes to the Morning Sun =

All Eyes To The Morning Sun

EP (Mini-Album) by Lights Action
- Released: April 14, 2008
- Recorded: Mayfair; The Pierce Rooms; Britanna Row; The Dairy
- Genres: Rock; Indie; Alternative
- Length: 21:32
- Label: Xtra Mile
- Producer: Richard Wilkinson

Professional ratings
Review scores
Source	Rating
Kerrang!	3/5 stars

All Eyes to the Morning Sun is a mini-album by Lights Action. It was released on April 14, 2008 as a digital download and also as an enhanced CD.

== Track listing ==
All lyrics are written by Patrick Currier except *; all music is composed by Lights.Action! except *.

No.	Title	Length
1.	"Aurora"	3:34
2.	"Story Of A Broken Boy"	3:51
3.	"Satellites"	3:59
4.	"Ghosts"	4:23
5.	"Hide And Seek" (* Written & composed by Imogen Heap)	4:40
6.	"All Eyes (outro)"	1:07

=== Enhanced CD ===
The enhanced cd track list is as above but includes the videos for the singles; "Satellites", "Story Of A Broken Boy" & "Aurora"

== Credits ==
- Patrick Currier - vocals, Cover Illustration
- Karl Bareham - Guitar, Layout & Design
- Chris Moorhead - Guitar/Keys
- Alex Leeder - Bass
- Steven Durham - drums
- Richard Wilkinson - Producer, Mixing (At The Pierce Rooms)
- Daniel Morrison - Additional Vocal Engineering at The Pierce Rooms
- Simon Hayes - Mayfair Assistant
- Toshi Minesaki - Mayfair Assistant
- Dave Terry - Mayfair Assistant
- Fred Vessey - Britannia Row Assistant
- Emma Hampson-Jones - Band Photography
- Phil Smith Design - Crest
