= Forgive (song) =

Single by Rebecca Lynn Howard

from the album Forgive
- B-side: "Pink Flamingo Kind of Love"
- Released: May 6, 2002
- Genre: Country
- Length: 3:58
- Label: MCA Nashville
- Songwriters: Trey Bruce; Rebecca Lynn Howard
- Producers: Trey Bruce; Mark Wright

Rebecca Lynn Howard singles chronology
"Simple Things" (2001)	"Forgive" (2002)	"What a Shame" (2003)

"Forgive" is a song by American country music singer-songwriter Rebecca Lynn Howard, written by Howard and Trey Bruce, who co-produced the track with Mark Wright. The track debuted to country radio on May 6, 2002, as the lead and only single from her second studio album of the same name via MCA Nashville. It was also included on the soundtrack to the NBC drama series Providence.

The track became a big success for Howard, peaking at number 12 on the US Hot Country Songs chart; it is to date her only top-40 entry on the chart. A video was also released, which became successful. Howard and Bruce would be nominated at the 38th Academy of Country Music Awards in 2003 for Song of the Year as songwriters; they ended up losing the award to Phillip Brian White and David Vincent Williams' "I'm Movin' On".

== Content ==
The narrator sings about an unfaithful partner who questions why she can't forgive him. The song was inspired by one of Howard's friends, who was going through a divorce at the time and gave Howard permission to use the details regarding that time.

== Music video ==
Morgan Lawley directed the music video for "Forgive". The video debuted to CMT on May 5, 2002. It was nominated at the 2003 CMT Flameworthy Awards for Female Video of the Year. The video ended up losing to Martina McBride's "Concrete Angel".

== Critical reception ==
Maria Konicki Dinoia of AllMusic called the song "chill-inducing" and a "masterpiece" in her review of the album.

== Commercial performance ==
"Forgive" entered the US Billboard Hot Country Songs chart the week of May 11, 2002, at number 56, becoming the second highest debut of the week. The track entered the top-40 of the chart the week of June 29, 2002, at number 40, marking Howard's first and only entry into the top-forty. "Forgive" would peak at number 12 on the chart on November 23, 2002 in its twenty-ninth week despite losing airplay. The song would spend 30 weeks in total.

"Forgive" debuted on Radio & Records's Country chart on May 17, 2002, at number 46. The song reached number ten on the chart the week of November 15, 2002. "Forgive" spent 29 weeks on the chart, its final being on November 29, 2002 at number 29.

== Track listing ==
All lyrics are written by Rebecca Lynn Howard and Trey Bruce.

7" single
No.	Title	Length
1.	"Forgive"	3:58
2.	"Pink Flamingo Kind of Love"	3:06

== Charts ==
=== Weekly charts ===
Chart (2002)	Peak position
US Country Top 50 (Radio & Records)	10
US Hot Country Songs (Billboard)	12
US Billboard Hot 100	71

=== Year-end charts ===
Chart (2002)	Position
US Country Songs (Billboard)	47
US Country (Radio & Records)	54
