= The Hurry and the Harm =

Studio album by City and Colour
- Released: June 4, 2013
- Studios: Blackbird Studio, Nashville, Tennessee
- Genre: Alternative rock
- Length: 50:49
- Labels: Dine Alone; Cooking Vinyl
- Producer: Alex Newport

City and Colour chronology
Little Hell (2011)	The Hurry and the Harm (2013)	If I Should Go Before You (2015)

Singles from The Hurry and the Harm
- 1. "Thirst" Released: April 9, 2013; 2. "Of Space and Time"; 3. "The Lonely Life" Released: 2013; 4. "Harder Than Stone" Released: January 27, 2014

Professional ratings
Aggregate scores
Source	Rating
Metacritic	67/100
Review scores
Source	Rating
Consequence of Sound	C−
Paste	8.3/10

The Hurry and the Harm is the fourth studio album by City and Colour. It was produced by Alex Newport and released on June 4, 2013, through Dine Alone Records and Cooking Vinyl.

The album received a score of 67 out of 100 from 10 critics on review aggregator Metacritic, indicating "generally favorable reviews".

== Commercial performance ==
The Hurry and the Harm debuted at No. 1 on the Canadian Albums Chart, selling 23,000 copies in its first week. It was City and Colour's second consecutive album to debut at No. 1 on the chart. Up to January 10, 2014, the album had sold 66,000 copies in Canada. The album was certified Platinum in Canada on February 13, 2014.

The album also debuted at No. 16 on the US Billboard 200 chart, selling 20,000 for the week. The album had sold 71,000 copies in the US up to September 2015.

== Track listing ==
All tracks are written by Dallas Green.

No.	Title	Length
1.	"The Hurry and the Harm"	4:23
2.	"Harder Than Stone"	4:26
3.	"Of Space and Time"	3:33
4.	"The Lonely Life"	4:34
5.	"Paradise"	3:38
6.	"Commentators"	3:35
7.	"Thirst"	3:26
8.	"Two Coins"	5:32
9.	"Take Care"	3:38
10.	"Ladies and Gentlemen"	4:05
11.	"The Golden State"	5:18
12.	"Death's Song"	4:43
Total length:		50:49

Deluxe edition bonus tracks
No.	Title	Length
13.	"The Way It Used to Be"	4:10
14.	"Of Space and Time" (acoustic version)	3:18
15.	"Harder Than Stone" (acoustic version)	3:47
Total length:		62:04

== Personnel ==
- Dallas Green – vocals, guitar
- Spencer Cullum Jr. – pedal steel
- Jack Lawrence – bass guitar
- Matt Chamberlain – drums
- James Gadson – drums (tracks 2 and 8)
- Bo Koster – keyboards
- Anthony Lamarchina – cello
- Karen Winkelmann – violin

Production

- Alex Newport – producer, engineering, mixing, mastering

== Charts ==
=== Weekly charts ===
Chart (2013)	Peak position
Australian Albums (ARIA)	4
Belgian Albums (Ultratop Flanders)	160
Canadian Albums (Billboard)	1
German Albums (Offizielle Top 100)	83
UK Albums (Official Charts)	32
US Billboard 200	16

=== Year-end charts ===
Chart (2013)	Position
Canadian Albums (Billboard)	31

== Certifications ==
Region	Certification	Certified units/sales
Canada (Music Canada)	Platinum	80,000^{^}
^{^} Shipments figures based on certification alone.
