= Welcome to the New Cold World =

Studio album by Lights Action
- Released: March 2, 2009
- Recorded: Konk; Union Chapel; The Pierce Rooms; Battery; Mayfair
- Genre: Rock; Indie; Alternative
- Length: 38:42
- Label: Colt Signals
- Producer: Richard Wilkinson

Professional ratings
Review scores
Source	Rating
Alternative Ulster	4/5 stars
NME	7/10 stars
Rock Sound	3/5 stars
Total Guitar	3/5 stars

Welcome to the New Cold World is an Album by Lights Action. It was released worldwide on March 2, 2009 as a digital download only, with the option to buy a CD version through the band's website.

== Track listing ==
All lyrics are written by Patrick Currier; all music is composed by Lights Action

No.	Title	Length
1.	"Moscow"	3:16
2.	"Battle of Lovers"	3:50
3.	"Signals to Radar"	4:09
4.	"Young Scarlett Young"	4:16
5.	"Travellin' Man"	3:18
6.	"I Woke Up in a Civil War"	2:07
7.	"Passions of the Lonely"	3:41
8.	"Until the Day I Die"	4:21
9.	"Black Feathers"	4:50
10.	"The Bottom of the Sea"	3:54

== Information of Value ==
=== Funding ===
The album was produced and mastered on a slim budget of around £15k. Much of the recording costs of the album were funded through the investment engine "SliceThePie".

=== Recording ===
The band spent the vast majority of 2008 writing and recording the album. Over 18 tracks were recorded for the album, the band choosing 10 to make the final cut.

=== Dirty Pretty Strings ===
The London-based string quartet "Dirty Pretty Strings" feature on four of the songs on the album. "Signals to Radar", "Young Scarlett Young", "I Woke Up in a Civil War" and "Black Feathers". Dirty Pretty Strings have worked with bands such as The Enemy, Lightspeed Champion and Ed Harcourt.

=== "The Bottom of the Sea" choir ===
The final track on the record features a choir vocal in the chorus. The vocals were recorded in various locations around the UK and feature the voices of the band themselves, along with Singer/songwriter Richard Walters, Dallas Green of Alexisonfire/City and Colour, Kenny Bridges of Moneen, and all of the Oxford Band A Silent Film.

== Credits ==
- Patrick Currier - vocals, Cover Illustration
- Karl Bareham - Guitar, Art Direction & Design
- Chris Moorhead - Guitar/Keys/String Arrangement
- Alex Leeder - Bass
- Steven Durham - drums/String Arrangement
- Richard Wilkinson - Producer, Mixing (At The Pierce Rooms/Mayfair)
- Doug Shearer - Mastering (At Pierce Entertainment)
- Dirty Pretty Strings - Session string quartet
- Dallas Green - Guest vocals (on "Bottom of the Sea")
- Kenny Bridges - Guest vocals (on "Bottom of the Sea")
- Richard Walters - Guest vocals (on "Bottom of the Sea")
- Rob Stevenson - Guest vocals (on "Bottom of the Sea")
- Spencer Walker - Guest vocals (on "Bottom of the Sea")
- Ali Hussain - Guest vocals (on "Bottom of the Sea")
- Lewis Jones - Guest vocals (on "Bottom of the Sea")
- Darren Heelis - Assistant Engineer (At The Pierce Rooms)
- Ben Bell - Mayfair Assistant
- Toshi Minesaki - Mayfair Assistant
- Dougal Lott - Konk Assistant
- Emma Hampson-Jones - Band Photography
- iheartstudios - still life photography
- Paul Russell for P Russell & Co - Legal
- Matt Hughes for Devil PR - UK Press
