= Comin' Home (City and Colour song) =

Single by City and Colour

from the album Sometimes
- Released: 2006
- Recorded: 2005
- Genre: Alternative country
- Length: 5:05
- Label: Dine Alone Records
- Songwriter: Dallas Green
- Producers: Julius Butty and Dallas Green

City and Colour singles chronology
"Save Your Scissors" (2005)	"Comin' Home" (2006)	"Like Knives" (2007)

Music video
- "Comin' Home" on YouTube

"Comin' Home" is a song written and recorded by Canadian artist City and Colour. It was released in 2006 as the second single from the album Sometimes.

== Music video ==
The music video was directed by Chris Sargent. It is in black and white and shows Dallas playing in different rooms, with scenes showing a woman in (what appears to be) some of the same rooms, but never at the same time as Dallas.

The song is referenced in a Cancer Bats music video for their song Pneumonia Hawk, where a group of men (played by the band members, along with Alexisonfire vocalist George Pettit and producer Greg Below) sing the song at the end.

== Charts ==
Chart (2006)	Peak position
Canada Rock (Billboard)	34
