= Sleeping Sickness (song) =

Single by City and Colour featuring Gord Downie

from the album Bring Me Your Love
- Released: June 8, 2008
- Genre: Alternative rock
- Length: 4:08
- Label: Universal Music Canada
- Songwriter(s): Dallas Green
- Producer(s): Dan Achen; Dallas Green

City and Colour singles chronology
"Waiting..." (2008)	"Sleeping Sickness" (2008)	"The Girl" (2009)

"Sleeping Sickness" is the second single from City and Colour's second album, Bring Me Your Love. The song features vocals from Gord Downie, the lead singer of The Tragically Hip. The single was certified Platinum in Canada on December 10, 2018. The song was used by CBC's Hockey Night In Canada during a video tribute at the end of the 2009 Stanley Cup Playoffs.

== Chart positions ==
Chart (2008)	Peak position
Canadian Hot 100	59
