= Forgive Me (EP) =

- Digital cover

EP by BoA
- Released: November 22, 2022
- Length: 18:37
- Language: Korean
- Labels: SM; Dreamus

BoA chronology
The Greatest (2022)	Forgive Me (2022)	Crazier (2025)

Singles from Forgive Me
- 1. "Forgive Me" Released: November 22, 2022

Professional ratings
Review scores
Source	Rating
NME	4/5 stars

Forgive Me is the third extended play by South Korean singer BoA. It was released by SM Entertainment on November 22, 2022, and contains six tracks, including the lead single of the same name.

== Background and release ==
On November 8, 2022, SM Entertainment announced BoA would be releasing her third extended play titled Forgive Me on November 22. Three days later, the promotional schedule was released with "Forgive Me" announced as the lead single. On November 21, the music video teaser for "Forgive Me" was released.

== Composition ==
Forgive Me consists of six tracks. The lead single "Forgive Me" was described as a hip-hop dance song characterized by "strong electric guitar rhythm" with lyrics about "giving a blow to an opponent who is mistaken and presumptuous while trapped in their own twisted frame". The second track "Zip" was described as R&B dance song with lyrics that "contains a warning message about not leaving any mercy to a lover who caused an irreversible relationship". The third track "Sketch" was described as a new wave-based pop song with "90's synth pluck rhythm and funky guitar rhythm". The fourth track "Breathe" was described as a "hybrid" electronica song with lyrics about "the moment when we get close enough to feel each other’s breathing". The fifth track "After Midnight" was described as acoustic pop song featuring "warm melody of an acoustic guitar". The sixth track "Hope" was described as acoustic ballad song with lyrics that "expresses love and gratitude to family, lovers, and friends who always stand by your side in a tiring life".

== Promotion ==
Prior to the release of Forgive Me, on November 22, 2022, BoA held a live event called "BoA 'Forgive Me' Countdown Live" on YouTube to introduce the EP and to communicate with her fans.

== Track listing ==
Track listing for Forgive Me
No.	Title	Lyrics	Music	Arrangement	Length
1.	"Forgive Me"	BoA	Omega; Jordan Reyes; BoA; Kriz; Rosina "Soaky Siren" Russell; Brooke Tomlinson	Omega; Jordan Reyes	2:48
2.	"Zip" (짓; Jit; Chit)	Kim Bo-eun (Jam Factory)	Ryan "Rykeyz" Williamson; Deez; Saay	Ryan "Rykeyz" Williamson	3:16
3.	"Sketch"	BoA	BoA; Shaun Kim	BoA; Shaun Kim	2:54
4.	"Breathe"	Jeong Ha-ri (153/Joombas)	Daniel Kim; Didrik Thott; The Architect	Daniel Kim	3:13
5.	"After Midnight"	Jo Yoon-kyung	Katie Tucker; Lucas Szulansky; Kyle Scherrer; Max Levin	Max & Kyle	3:01
6.	"Hope"	BoA	BoA; Sinil Jo; Shaun Kim	BoA; Sinil Jo; Shaun Kim	3:25
Total length:					18:37

== Charts ==
=== Weekly charts ===
Weekly chart performance for Forgive Me
Chart (2022)	Peak position
Japanese Digital Albums (Oricon)	21
Japanese Hot Albums (Billboard Japan)	88
South Korean Albums (Circle)	6

=== Monthly charts ===
Monthly chart performance for Forgive Me
Chart (2022)	Peak position
South Korean Albums (Circle)	43

== Release history ==
Release history for Forgive Me
Region	Date	Format	Label
South Korea	November 22, 2022	CD	SM; Dreamus
Various	November 22, 2022	Digital download; streaming	SM; Dreamus
