= Waiting... (City and Colour song) =

Single by City and Colour

from the album Bring Me Your Love
- Released: January 1, 2008
- Genre: Alternative rock
- Length: 4:54 (Album version); 4:37 (Radio edit)
- Label: Dine Alone Records
- Songwriter: Dallas Green
- Producers: Dan Achen; Dallas Green

City and Colour singles chronology
"Like Knives" (2007)	"Waiting..." (2008)	"Sleeping Sickness" (2008)

"Waiting..." is the first single from City and Colour's second album, Bring Me Your Love. The song peaked at No. 32 on the Canadian Hot 100.
