= Save Your Scissors =

Single by City and Colour

from the album Sometimes
- Released: 2005
- Recorded: 2005
- Genre: Acoustic music
- Length: 4:48
- Label: Dine Alone Records
- Songwriter: Dallas Green
- Producers: Julius Butty and Dallas Green

City and Colour singles chronology
| "Save Your Scissors" (2005) | "Comin' Home" (2006) |

Music video
- "Save Your Scissors" on YouTube

"Save Your Scissors" is a song by City and Colour. It was released in 2005 as the lead single from City and Colour's debut album, Sometimes. The song features Dallas Green's vocals and guitar, without accompaniment.

== Music video ==
The music video shows Dallas' everyday life living in St. Catharines, Ontario, with his playing, eating lunch, stopping by a music store, and going to a practice with Alexisonfire, among other things.

== Charts ==
| Chart (2006) | Peak position |
|---|---|
| Canada (Nielsen BDS) | 16 |
| Canada Hot AC (Billboard) | 18 |
| Canada Rock Top 30 (Radio & Records) | 9 |
