= When My Dreams Come True =

Single by Rebecca Lynn Howard

from the album Rebecca Lynn Howard
- B-side: "Out Here in the Water"
- Released: June 28, 1999
- Genre: Country
- Length: 3:16
- Label: MCA Nashville
- Songwriters: Trey Bruce; J.D. Martin
- Producers: Mark Wright; Greg Droman

Rebecca Lynn Howard singles chronology
"When My Dreams Come True" (1999)	"Out Here in the Water" (2000)

"When My Dreams Come True" is the debut single by American country music singer-songwriter Rebecca Lynn Howard. Written by Trey Bruce and J.D. Martin and production by Mark Wright and Greg Droman, it was released on June 28, 1999, as the lead single to her eponymous debut studio album (2000) via MCA Nashville Records. It was one of two songs on the album which Howard does not have a writing credit on.

The song became a minor success following its release, entering the country charts of both the US and Canada.

== Music video ==
Deaton-Flanigen Productions directed the music video. The video was released before the song, debuting to CMT on June 6, 1999.

== Commercial performance ==
"When My Dreams Come True" debuted on the US Billboard Hot Country Songs chart the week of July 17, 1999, at number 66. The following week, the track fell to number 69. In its fourth week, the song reached its minor peak of number 65. The song spent 8 weeks in total on the chart. It also proved to have minor success in Canada, debuting at number 93 on the RPM Country Tracks chart. It peaked at number 84, spending 5 weeks on the chart.

A commercial single was released, debuting at number 25 on the US Top Country Singles Sales chart on July 31, 1999. It peaked at number 14 on the chart and spent 10 weeks in total on the chart.

== Charts ==
Chart (1999)	Peak position
Canada Country Singles (RPM)	84
US Hot Country Songs (Billboard)	65
US Top Country Singles Sales (Billboard)	14
