= Forgive (album) =

Studio album by Rebecca Lynn Howard
- Released: September 10, 2002
- Genre: Country
- Length: 45:24
- Label: MCA Nashville
- Producer: Trey Bruce; Steve Fishell; Mark Wright

Rebecca Lynn Howard chronology
Rebecca Lynn Howard (2000)	Forgive (2002)	No Rules (2008)

Singles from Forgive
- 1. "Forgive" Released: May 6, 2002

Forgive is the second studio album by American country music artist Rebecca Lynn Howard, released on September 10, 2002, by MCA Nashville Records.

== Content ==
The title track was the only single released from the album. It reached number 12 on the US Hot Country Songs chart, becoming her only top-forty hit to date.

The track "Jesus and Bartenders" was originally recorded by Larry Cordle on his 2000 studio album Murder on Music Row and would later be recorded by Daryle Singletary for his 2007 studio album Straight from the Heart, where it was released as a single.

== Critical reception ==
Professional ratings
Review scores
Source	Rating
AllMusic	4/5 stars
People	favorable

Maria Konicki Dinoia of AllMusic gave Forgive a positive review, saying "Loaded with diversity, freshness, and inspiration, Forgive will no doubt earn its place on one of the top spots of the charts." In contrast, Jeffrey B. Remz of Country Standard Time gave the album an unfavorable review, criticizing Howard for not being sure "whether she wants to be a country singer or pop rock."

== Commercial performance ==
Forgive opened up with first week sales of 25,297 copies on September 28, 2002, debuting at number 5 on the US Billboard Top Country Albums chart.

== Track listing ==
All tracks produced by Trey Bruce except where noted.

Forgive track listing
No.	Title	Writer(s)	Producer(s)	Length
1.	"Beautiful to You"	Rebecca Lynn Howard; Trey Bruce		3:44
2.	"Dancin' in God's Country"	Howard; Larry Williams; Kim Williams		4:02
3.	"It Didn't Look Like Alcohol"	Howard; Bruce		4:28
4.	"Life Had Other Plans"	Angelo Petraglia; Georgia Middleman		3:41
5.	"Forgive"	Howard; Bruce	Trey Bruce; Mark Wright	3:58
6.	"It's My Job to Fall"	Leslie Satcher		4:12
7.	"Jesus and Bartenders"	Larry Cordle; Satcher	Steve Fishell	3:58
8.	"This Love"	Howard; Marty Dodson		4:01
9.	"You Ever Listen to Me"	Tim Johnson; Gary Cotton		3:04
10.	"Memorized"	Howard; James LeBlanc		3:56
11.	"Pink Flamingo Kind of Love"	Howard; Bruce		3:10
12.	"Softly and Tenderly"	Will Lamartine Thompson		3:10
Total length:				45:24

== Personnel ==
Compiled from liner notes.

Musicians on all tracks except "Jesus and Bartenders"

- Trey Bruce – programming
- Pat Buchanan – electric guitar
- Lisa Cochran – background vocals
- J. T. Corenflos – electric guitar, acoustic guitar, gut string guitar
- Melodie Crittenden – background vocals
- Tony Harrell – piano, Hammond B-3 organ, Mellotron, accordion, Wurlitzer electric piano
- Wes Hightower – background vocals
- Steve Hinson – steel guitar, Dobro
- Rebecca Lynn Howard – lead vocals
- Greg Morrow – drums
- Alison Prestwood – bass guitar
- Chris Rodriguez – background vocals
- Brian Siewert – synthesizer
- Marty Slayton – background vocals
- Michael Spriggs – acoustic guitar, bouzouki
- Neil Thrasher – background vocals
- Jonathan Yudkin – mandolin, fiddle, Jew's harp, banjo, cello, viola, harp, orchestra bells

Strings on "Forgive": Carolyn Bailey, Christopher Farrell, Lynn Peithman, Alison Gooding, Erin Hall, Beverly Duker, Shu-Zheng Yang, Julia Tanner, David Reneau, Denise Baker, Melinda Bootz, and Jeremy Williams

Musicians on "Jesus and Bartenders"

- Kenny Aronoff – drums
- Dan Dugmore – acoustic guitar
- Steve Fishell – steel guitar
- Johnny Hiland – lead guitar
- John Barlow Jarvis – piano
- Michael Joyce – bass guitar
- Troy Lancaster – electric guitar
- Rick Vito – electric guitar
- Jonathan Yudkin – fiddle

Technical

- Chuck Ainlay – recording ("Jesus and Bartenders" only)
- Trey Bruce – production (except "Jesus and Bartenders")
- David Buchanan – recording (except "Jesus and Bartenders")
- Steve Fishell – production ("Jesus and Bartenders" only)
- Kelly Geidt – production coordination
- Todd Gunnerson – recording assistant (except "Forgive" and "Jesus and Bartenders")
- Erik Jaskowiak – recording assistant ("Jesus and Bartenders" only)
- Heather Kennel – production coordination
- Brian Siewert – string arrangement on "Forgive"
- Joey Turner – recording assistant ("Forgive" only)
- Jon Van Nest – mixing
- Ronnie Thomas – editing
- Hank Williams – mastering
- Mark Wright – production ("Forgive" only)

== Charts ==
=== Weekly charts ===
Chart (2002)	Peak position
US Billboard 200	29
US Top Country Albums (Billboard)	5

=== Year-end charts ===
Chart (2002)	Position
US Top Country Albums (Billboard)	66
