= Bring Me Your Love (short story) =

1983 short story by Charles Bukowski

"Bring Me Your Love", is a 1983 short story by Charles Bukowski, illustrated by Robert Crumb. A filmed version by David Morrissey stars Ian Hart as the journalist bringing flowers to his wife in a mental hospital. The 2008 album of the same title by City and Colour is named after the story.
