= A Pill for Loneliness =

Studio album by City and Colour
- Released: 4 October 2019
- Genres: Alternative rock, indie rock, folk rock
- Length: 52:17
- Label: Still Records
- Producer: Jacquire King

City and Colour chronology
Guide Me Back Home (2018)	A Pill for Loneliness (2019)	The Love Still Held Me Near (2023)

Singles from A Pill for Loneliness
- 1. "Astronaut" Released: 3 June 2019; 2. "Strangers" Released: 21 June 2019; 3. "Living in Lightning" Released: 16 August 2019; 4. "Difficult Love" Released: 2020

Professional ratings
Aggregate scores
Source	Rating
Metacritic	60/100
Review scores
Source	Rating
AllMusic	3.5/5 stars
DIY	3.5/5 stars
Exclaim!	7/10
Gigwise	9/10 stars

A Pill for Loneliness is the sixth studio album by City and Colour. It was released on 4 October 2019 through frontman Dallas Green's own record label, Still Records. The lead single, "Astronaut", was released on 3 June 2019, with the album being officially announced on 15 August 2019. The release was City and Colour's fourth consecutive studio album to reach No. 1 on the Canadian Albums Chart.

The album was a Juno Award nominee for Adult Alternative Album of the Year at the Juno Awards of 2020.

== Track listing ==
All tracks are written by Dallas Green.

No.	Title	Length
1.	"Living in Lightning"	3:19
2.	"Astronaut"	6:01
3.	"Imagination"	5:47
4.	"Difficult Love"	4:04
5.	"Me and the Moonlight"	2:52
6.	"Mountain of Madness"	4:41
7.	"Song of Unrest"	4:45
8.	"Strangers"	4:04
9.	"The War Years"	6:37
10.	"Young Lovers"	4:07
11.	"Lay Me Down"	6:00

== Personnel ==
Musicians

- Dallas Green – lead vocals, background vocals, acoustic guitar (1–4, 8, 10), electric guitar (1–10), percussion (3, 7, 10, 11), keyboards (11)
- Jack Lawrence – bass
- Matt Kelly – background vocals (2, 3, 5, 6, 8), pedal steel guitar (1, 5, 9, 11), keyboards
- Leon Power – drums (1–10), percussion (3, 7, 9)
- Chad Howat – keyboards (5, 7, 9–11), programming (10, 11)
- Spencer Thomson – keyboards (1–4, 6–8, 11), acoustic guitar (3, 4, 8), electric guitar (2–4), programming (1–4, 6–8, 11)
- Jacquire King – programming, percussion (kick drum) (11)
- Karl Bareham – keyboards (7), programming (7), percussion (ride cymbal) (11)
- Gemma Mazza – piano (8)

Production

- Jacquire King – producer, mixing, engineer
- Karl Bareham – additional production, engineer
- Danny Pellegrini – recording and mixing assistant, additional engineering
- Luke Schindler – recording assistant
- Gemma Mazza – recording assistant
- Emily Lazar – mastering
- Chris Allgood – mastering assistant

== Charts ==
Chart (2019)	Peak position
Australian Albums (ARIA)	8
Canadian Albums (Billboard)	1
Scottish Albums (Official Charts)	63
US Americana/Folk Albums (Billboard)	9
US Independent Albums (Billboard)	8
US Top Album Sales (Billboard)	25
