= Geneviève Racette =

Folk singer-songwriter from Montreal

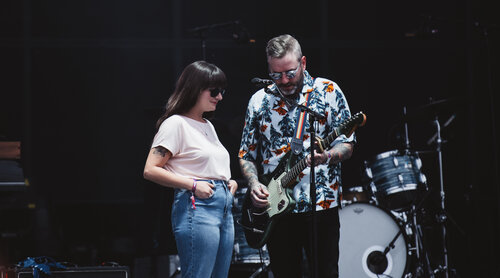
- Geneviève Racette in studio

Background information
- Born: August 31, 1990 (age 35); Dorval, Quebec, Canada
- Genres: Folk
- Occupations: Singer, composer, performer, musician
- Instruments: Vocals, guitar
- Years active: 2014–present
- Website: genevieveracette.com

Geneviève Racette (born August 31, 1990) is a singer-songwriter from Montreal, Quebec.

== Biography ==
Originally from Dorval, Racette is a bilingual singer-songwriter. She started singing at the age of 8 and got her first guitar at 11. She is the daughter of two parents who are musicians and have studied music. Her mother is a classically trained pianist and her father is a music lover and self-taught guitarist.

Her first EP, "Geneviève Racette", was released in May 2014 and earned her a nomination for the SiriusXM Indies Awards (2015) "Francophone Artist of the Year (Emerging)". Her first full-length album "Les aurores boréales" was released in May 2016, and where picked up by several Canadian radio stations, including Ici Musique, SiriusXM and more than 40 other stations.

In 2017, Geneviève opened on tour for Valérie Carpentier and François Lachance. That same year, she was chosen from among 150 artists to participate in the Banff Centre for Arts and Creativity's singer-songwriter residency, to work on her songs with some of Nashville's most renowned creators. After a busy summer season with the ROSEQ "Découverte" tour in 2017, Geneviève launches a mini-album project of English-language covers simply entitled "Covers".

In 2019, she returned to the Banff Center for Arts and Creativity to work on the pre-production of her album, "No Water, No Flowers". This first English-language album enabled Geneviève to win the Emerging Artist of the Year award at the Canadian Folk Music Awards (2020). Several songs from this album are featured on numerous editorial playlists on Apple Music, Spotify and Amazon Music and are in the top 10 of Ici Musique on SiriusXM.

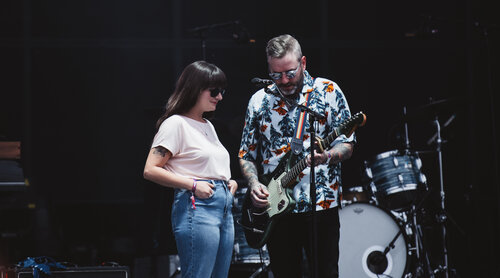
Geneviève Racette with Dallas Green on stage at Osheaga 2019

She caught the attention of singer-songwriter Dallas Green on Instagram with her cover of Hello, I'm in Delaware. He then invited her to perform with him on stage at the 2019 Osheaga Festival.

The concert tour that followed the release of the album "No Water, No Flowers" brought Geneviève to perform on Canadian stages from coast to coast, playing over a hundred Canadian venues. Racette has expanded her performance territory from primarily Quebec venues to other Canadian provinces: Manitoba, Saskatchewan and the Maritimes, headlining each tour. Osheaga, Home Routes – Chemin chez nous, Canadian Music Week (2019), Folk Music Ontario (2019), Folk Alliance International (2020), are just a few of the events in which the artist participated in 2019 and 2020.

In May 2021 she released the single Maybe and in September 2021 the single Les adieux. In March 2022 Geneviève releases her third LP, Satellite.

== Discography ==
2024 : Golden, Studio Album by Geneviève Racette
No.	Title	Length
1.	"From Friends to Strangers"	3:15
2.	"X2"	3:27
3.	"Things You Can't Say"	3:32
4.	"Golden"	3:06
5.	"My Thoughts of You"	2:11
6.	"Same Old Me"	4:22
7.	"Instagram"	3:08
8.	"I Hope It Hurts"	2:51
9.	"In Circles"	3:23
10.	"Home Movies"	3:59
11.	"Feel Things"	3:57
12.	"The Reasons (I'll Be Alright)"	3:47
Total length:		41:03

2022 : Satellite, Studio Album by Geneviève Racette
No.	Title	Length
1.	"Hostage"	3:50
2.	"Maybe"	3:34
3.	"Les adieux"	2:54
4.	"Someone"	3:37
5.	"Waiting For Your Call"	3:50
6.	"Satellite"	4:02
7.	"Sober"	4:08
8.	"The Tide"	3:12
9.	"Change My Mind"	3:52
Total length:		32:59

2022 : Someone, single album by Geneviève Racette
No.	Title	Length
1.	"Someone"	3:37
Total length:		3:37

2021 : Les Adieux, single album by Geneviève Racette
No.	Title	Length
1.	"Les adieux"	2:52
Total length:		2:52

2021 : Maybe, single album by Geneviève Racette
No.	Title	Length
1.	"Maybe"	3:33
Total length:		3:33

2021 : If I Were A Boy, single album by Geneviève Leclerc and Geneviève Racette
No.	Title	Length
1.	"If I Were A Boy"	3:37
Total length:		3:37

2019: Fa La La La La, EP by Geneviève Racette
No.	Title	Length
1.	"Christmas Time Is Here"	3:02
2.	"The Christmas Song"	4:23
3.	"Silent Night (feat Campbell Woods)"	2:50
4.	"The Chimpmunk Song (Christmas Don't Be Late)"	3:23
5.	"What Are You Doing New Year's Eve"	3:16
Total length:		16:56

2019 : Hello, I'm in Delaware, single album by Geneviève Racette
No.	Title	Length
1.	"Hello, I'm in Delaware"	4:41
Total length:		4:41

2019 : No Water, No Flowers, Studio Album by Geneviève Racette
No.	Title	Length
1.	"Parachute"	3:45
2.	"Northern Star"	3:17
3.	"Sans toi"	3:15
4.	"Miles Away"	4:13
5.	"Magnetic Love"	3:47
6.	"Mille fois par jour"	3:27
7.	"Margo's Song"	4:04
8.	"No Water, No Flowers"	3:24
9.	"Les lignes de ma main"	3:48
10.	"In Your Arms"	3:35
Total length:		36:39

2019 : No Water No Flowers part 2, EP by Geneviève Racette
No.	Title	Length
1.	"Magnetic Love"	3:47
2.	"Mille fois par jour"	3:27
3.	"In Your Arms"	3:35
Total length:		10:50

2019 : No Water No Flowers part 1, EP by Geneviève Racette
No.	Title	Length
1.	"Northern Star"	3:23
2.	"Parachute"	3:49
3.	"Sans toi"	3:17
Total length:		10:31

2017 : Covers, EP by Geneviève Racette
No.	Title	Length
1.	"Boy from the North Country"	3:26
2.	"Something"	3:06
3.	"Come as You Are"	3:22
4.	"I Can't Make You Love Me"	3:30
Total length:		13:26

2016 : Les aurores boréales, Studio Album by Geneviève Racette
No.	Title	Length
1.	"Le feu"	4:14
2.	"Noir et blanc"	4:19
3.	"Clichés"	4:20
4.	"Maison d'oiseaux"	4:08
5.	"Petit nid"	3:35
6.	"L'élan"	4:03
7.	"Muette"	3:25
8.	"Fleures d'été"	4:06
9.	"Voiture aérienne à hélices"	4:29
Total length:		36:44

2014 : The Christmas EP, EP by Geneviève Racette et Luc Hermann
No.	Title	Length
1.	"Have yourself a Merry Little Christmas"	4:12
2.	"I'll be Home for Christmas"	2:44
3.	"Let it Snow"	3:27
4.	"Marie Noël"	2:14
5.	"River"	4:54
6.	"White Christmas"	3:07
Total length:		20:40

2014 : Geneviève Racette, EP by Geneviève Racette
No.	Title	Length
1.	"Bricolage"	3:35
2.	"À cause de toi"	4:24
3.	"Le manteau"	4:07
4.	"Multicolore"	3:35
Total length:		15:43
