= Murderer (EP) =

EP by Low
- Released: September 2003
- Genres: Indie rock; Slowcore
- Length: 16:47
- Label: Vinyl Films

Low chronology
Trust (2003)	Murderer (2003)	A Lifetime of Temporary Relief (2004)

Murderer is an EP by American slowcore group Low, released in a limited run of 10" vinyl by Vinyl Films in September 2003. The EP includes the original versions of "Murderer" and "Silver Rider", which were later re-recorded for the albums Drums and Guns and The Great Destroyer, respectively. The art for the EP was created by photographer Jason Huntzinger.

In December 2003, American webzine Somewhere Cold voted Murderer Vinyl of the Year on their 2003 Somewhere Cold Awards Hall of Fame list.

== Track listing ==
Side A
No.	Title	Length
1.	"Murderer"	3:05
2.	"Silver Rider"	5:26

Side B
No.	Title	Length
1.	"From Your Place on Sunset"	8:16

== Extra links ==
- Murderer EP at Discogs
