= Bring Me Your Love (album) =

2008 studio album by City and Colour

Studio album by City and Colour
- Released: February 12, 2008
- Studios: Catherine North, Hamilton, Ontario
- Genres: Folk, acoustic, alternative country
- Length: 48:19
- Labels: Dine Alone, Vagrant, Shock
- Producers: Dan Achen, Dallas Green

City and Colour chronology
| Live (2007) | Bring Me Your Love (2008) | Little Hell (2011) |

Alternative cover
- Special Limited Edition cover

Singles from Bring Me Your Love
- 1. "Waiting..." Released: January 1, 2008; 2. "Sleeping Sickness" Released: June 6, 2008; 3. "The Girl" Released: December 3, 2008

Professional ratings
Review scores
| Source | Rating |
|---|---|
| AbsolutePunk.net | (83%) |
| Allmusic | 4/5 stars |
| Kerrang | 4/5 stars |
| PunkTV.ca | 9/10 stars |
| TheStar.com | 7/10 stars |
| Unglued Reviews | (Positive) |

Bring Me Your Love is the second album by City and Colour, released on February 12, 2008, through Dine Alone Records. According to Billboard, the album debuted at #11 of the Top Heatseekers chart in March 2008.

The songs on this album are more folk-oriented with occasional harmonica, bass, drums, banjo and mandolin as opposed to the previous releases which only consisted of acoustic guitar and piano.

On February 8, the complete album was made available for listening on City and Colour's official MySpace profile.

The music video for the first single, "Waiting...", was released on January 24, 2008, and was listed for 9 weeks on the Canadian Hot 100.

In October, 2008, Dine Alone Records announced a special 2-disc limited edition of Bring Me Your Love to be released on December 2, 2008. Only 6000 copies were made available. In Canada, when the record label put up the album on pre-sale on November 20, 2008, so many fans tried to pre-order it that they crashed the store's website.

Gordon Downie, of The Tragically Hip makes an appearance on the album, lending his vocals to the third verse on the second single, "Sleeping Sickness" which was listed for 9 weeks on the Canadian Hot 100. The video for "Sleeping Sickness", directed by Montreal-based director Vincent Morisset, was released on June 27, 2008, with an interactive version being available on the group's official website.

The album is named after a short story by Charles Bukowski. It is also a line sung in the closing track, "As Much as I Ever Could".

Bring Me Your Love was released on vinyl in Canada in 2011.

== Release ==
On December 4, 2007, Bring Me Your Love was announced for release in two months' time. On January 8, 2008, the album's artwork and track listing were posted online. Five days later, "Waiting" was posted on the band's Myspace profile. On January 31, 2008, a music video was released for "Waiting". Bring Me Your Love was made available for streaming on February 8, 2008, and was released four days later. In April 2008, the band toured across the United Kingdom with Attack in Black. In May and June 2008, the band went on a Canadian tour with Sleepercar and Black Lungs, which included a performance at the Virgin Festival. On June 9, 2008, "Sleeping Sadness" was released on a seven-inch vinyl record with a demo version of it as the B-side. At the end of the month, a music video was released for "Sleeping Sickness", which was directed by Vincent Monsset and stars Gordon Downie of the Tragically Hip. In September and October 2008, the band went on a US tour with Tegan and Sara and Girl in a Coma. A special edition was released digitally on November 25, 2008, and physically on December 2, 2008. Physical copies of this edition were limited to 5000 copies for North America and to 1000 copies for Australia. It included new artwork, the original album, a second disc with 14 demo versions, 2 unreleased songs from the sessions and a handwritten booklet with behind-the-scenes photographs from Vanessa Heins. A bundle including the new version of Bring Me Your Love and a special t-shirt, limited to 100 copies, was sold in Canada. On December 8, 2008, a music video was released for "The Girl". In January 2009, the band went a tour of the US alongside William Elliott Whitmore. A live version of "Forgive Me", alongside a version of "Boiled Frogs" by Alexisonfire, was released as a digital single under the name Live at the Verge in January 2010.

== Track listing ==
All tracks are written by Dallas Green.

Standard edition
| No. | Title | Length |
|---|---|---|
| 1. | "Forgive Me" | 2:08 |
| 2. | "Confessions" | 3:46 |
| 3. | "The Death of Me" | 3:10 |
| 4. | "Body in a Box" | 4:12 |
| 5. | "Sleeping Sickness" (featuring Gordon Downie of The Tragically Hip) | 4:08 |
| 6. | "What Makes a Man?" | 3:26 |
| 7. | "Waiting..." | 4:54 |
| 8. | "Constant Knot" | 4:03 |
| 9. | "Against the Grain" | 3:46 |
| 10. | "The Girl" | 6:00 |
| 11. | "Sensible Heart" | 3:21 |
| 12. | "As Much as I Ever Could" | 5:25 |

iTunes bonus track
| No. | Title | Length |
|---|---|---|
| 13. | "I Don't Need to Know" (rough mix) (pre-order only) | 2:59 |

Special limited edition disc 1
| No. | Title | Length |
|---|---|---|
| 1. | "Forgive Me" | 2:08 |
| 2. | "Confessions" | 3:46 |
| 3. | "The Death of Me" | 3:10 |
| 4. | "Body in a Box" | 4:12 |
| 5. | "Sleeping Sickness" (featuring Gordon Downie) | 4:08 |
| 6. | "What Makes a Man?" | 3:26 |
| 7. | "Waiting..." | 4:54 |
| 8. | "Constant Knot" | 4:03 |
| 9. | "Against the Grain" | 3:46 |
| 10. | "The Girl" | 6:00 |
| 11. | "Sensible Heart" | 3:21 |
| 12. | "As Much as I Ever Could" | 5:25 |
| 13. | "Faithless" (previously unreleased) | 2:34 |
| 14. | "I Don't Need to Know" (previously unreleased) | 3:00 |
| Total length: | | 50:52 |

Special limited edition disc 2
| No. | Title | Length |
|---|---|---|
| 1. | "Forgive Me" (Demo version) | 2:21 |
| 2. | "Confessions" (Demo version) | 4:35 |
| 3. | "The Death of Me" (Demo version) | 3:31 |
| 4. | "Body in a Box" (Demo version) | 4:39 |
| 5. | "Sleeping Sickness" (Demo version) | 4:14 |
| 6. | "What Makes a Man?" (Demo version) | 3:36 |
| 7. | "Waiting..." (Demo version) | 4:37 |
| 8. | "Constant Knot" (Quiet demo version) | 4:38 |
| 9. | "Constant Knot" (Horns demo version) | 4:20 |
| 10. | "Against the Grain" (Demo version) | 4:46 |
| 11. | "Sensible Heart" (Demo version) | 4:19 |
| 12. | "As Much as I Ever Could" (Demo version) | 5:04 |
| 13. | "Faithless" (previously unreleased demo) | 2:47 |
| 14. | "I Don't Need to Know" (previously unreleased demo) | 3:34 |
| Total length: | | 56:56 |

== Personnel ==
- Dallas Green - vocals (all tracks), acoustic guitar (tracks 1,2,3, 4, 5,6 7, 8, 9, 10, 12), electric guitar (tracks 7, 12), piano (track 7)
- Daniel Romano - acoustic guitar (tracks 7, 8, 9, 10, 12), pedal steel (tracks 2, 8), percussion (tracks 2, 5), drums (tracks 3, 12), bass guitar (tracks 3, 7), organ (tracks 4, 7), slide guitar (track 2), mandolin (track 3), electric guitar (track 5), piano (track 11), vocals (track 12)
- Gordon Downie - vocals (track 5)
- Zander Lamothe - bass drum (track 5)
- Jordan Mitchell - vocals (track 8)
- Spencer Burton - vocals (track 10)
- Dan Under - vocals (track 12)
- David, Daniel, Ian and Joni Romano, Katie Parsons, Jordan Mitchell, Dan Achen - group vocals (track 8)

== Charts ==
| Chart (2008) | Peak position |
|---|---|
| Australian Albums (ARIA) | 31 |
| Canadian Albums (Billboard) | 3 |
