= Rebecca Lynn Howard =

American singer-songwriter (born 1979)

- Born: April 24, 1979 (age 47)
- Origin: Salyersville, Kentucky, United States
- Genres: Country; pop; rock; gospel
- Occupation: Singer-songwriter
- Instruments: Vocals; bass; guitar; piano
- Years active: 1997–present
- Labels: Rising Tide; Decca Nashville; MCA Nashville; Arista Nashville; Show Dog Nashville; Saguaro Road; Pump House
- Formerly of: Loving Mary
- Website: www.rebeccalynnofficial.com

Rebecca Lynn Howard (born April 24, 1979) is an American singer-songwriter. She has charted seven singles on the Billboard Hot Country Songs charts, and has released three studio albums. Her highest-charting single, "Forgive", peaked at number 12 on the country music charts in 2002. She is a founding member of the country rock group Loving Mary.

== Biography ==
=== Career ===
Howard began her professional career as a singer-songwriter in 1997, writing for Patty Loveless, John Michael Montgomery, Jessica Andrews, Lila McCann and others. After signing to Rising Tide Records Nashville, she recorded a cover of the hymn "Softly and Tenderly" for the soundtrack of the film The Apostle before the label closed in March 1998. Later, she signed with Decca Records.

Her self-titled debut album was released by MCA Nashville in 2000 and included the singles "When My Dreams Come True," "Out Here in the Water" and "I Don't Paint Myself into Corners," all of which charted on the Billboard country singles charts.

In 2001, accompanied on the piano by Jim Brickman, Howard sang "Simple Things," the lead single from his album of the same name. The song peaked at No. 1 on Billboard's Adult Contemporary Chart.

The title track of her second album, Forgive (2002) reached No. 12 on Billboard, broke Top 10 on the Radio and Records country chart, and became a Top 40 single. Two more singles followed in 2003: "What a Shame" and "I Need a Vacation," which respectively reached No. 43 and No. 49 on Billboard's Hot Country Songs. Howard exited MCA in 2004.

In 2004, Howard recorded a cover of "If I Could Only Win Your Love," a duet with Ronnie Dunn for Livin', Lovin', Losin': Songs of the Louvin Brothers. Howard has sung vocals on numerous albums for major artists, including Dolly Parton, Patty Loveless, and Vince Gill. She has also toured extensively with Kenny Rogers, Alan Jackson, Blake Shelton, Gretchen Wilson, and Steven Tyler. Howard has been a frequent performer at the Grand Ole Opry ever since her debut in 1994, and toured as one of the headliners of the 2004 Grand Ole Opry American Road Show.

By 2005, Howard moved to Arista Nashville, where she released two more singles, including "No One'll Ever Love Me," which reached No. 48, and "That's Why I Hate Pontiacs".

Her third album was 2008's No Rules, on the Saguaro Road label.

Howard performed "Forgive" on the NBC primetime television drama series Providence. The song featured prominently in the Season Five episode "The Sound of Music," with Howard credited as herself.

Howard has been nominated twice for the Academy of Country Music Awards and is a two-time recipient of the International Bluegrass Music Awards (for "If I Could Only Win Your Love" and "Love Please Stay" on Larry Sparks's album 40.)

In 2017, Howard announced the debut of her new company, the Second Say, which features Rebecca Lynn Howard as a motivational speaker for corporate and trade association meetings. Her company also provides leadership workshops and musical performances. "I'm here to connect with people," Howard said. "When I'm singing, I'm speaking to people. I feel like this venture is an extension of who I am." Additionally, she serves as a creativity consultant for business leaders.

In 2023, Howard released the first single "I Am My Mother" from her latest album "I'm Not Who You Think I Am" released on May 2, 2025, on Pump House Records.

=== Covers and songwriting credits ===
Howard's "I Don't Paint Myself Into Corners" (co-written with Trey Bruce) was recorded by Trisha Yearwood for her 2001 album Inside Out. Yearwood later performed the song at the 2002 Country Music Awards. "As Long As We're Here," co-written by Howard and Jan Buckingham, was recorded by Clay Aiken on his 2008 album On My Way Here. In 2011, Martina McBride recorded Howard's "Whatcha Gonna Do" (co-written with Rachel Thibodeaux and Jason Sever) for her album Eleven. In 2016, Howard was a co-writer of "Lipstick" (for which she developed the song concept and signature lyric), which became a breakout hit for the trio Runaway June. She has also co-written numerous songs for Gwen Sebastian and was a co-writer with Charles Esten (of the TV series Nashville) for his single "Don't Cry Long." With husband Elisha Hoffman she also has songwriting credits on the hard rock band New Medicine's 2010 album Race You to the Bottom and "World Class Fuck Up" from its follow up Breaking the Model (2014).

=== Loving Mary ===
In 2014, Howard joined Suzie McNeil, Marti Frederiksen, Andrew Mactaggart, Sarah Tomek, and husband, Elisha Hoffman to form the country rock group Loving Mary in which she serves as songwriter, vocalist, and bassist. The group joined Aerosmith's Steven Tyler as backup band on his debut country solo studio album We're All Somebody from Somewhere and its supporting "Out On A Limb" tour in the U.S. and Japan. The band has made numerous appearances with Tyler on the festival circuit, including WE Fest and The Pilgrimage Music Festival, as well as on The Tonight Show Starring Jimmy Fallon, The Ellen DeGeneres Show, and The TODAY Show.

Loving Mary released its debut album Little Bit of Love in 2016.

In 2017, Loving Mary joined Gretchen Wilson on a multi-city tour in support of her album Ready to Get Rowdy.

=== Critical reception ===
Howard's vocal and songwriting abilities have earned wide critical praise. In her AllMusic review of Forgive, Maria Konicki Dinoia called the title track a "chill-inducing masterpiece" and described the album as "loaded with diversity, freshness, and inspiration." Entertainment Weekly had similar praise for her performance of "Jesus and Bartenders" from the same album: "Now, that's country!" CMT News described "I Don't Paint Myself Into Corners" as a "soaring declaration of freedom" while Billboard Magazine called it "pure country joy." AllMusic's Thom Jurek praised the "deep, high lonesome sound" of Howard's duet with Vince Gill, "Girl" and gave a glowing review to Howard's third album, No Rules—naming it an "enormous leap in creative growth that is the measure of a consummate artist" and "easily Rebecca Lynn Howard's finest, most consistent record to date."

== Personal life ==
Howard was raised in Salyersville, Kentucky, and first began singing in church. She currently lives in Nashville, Tennessee, with her husband, songwriter/producer Elisha Hoffman. Howard plays a Höfner bass guitar.

== Discography ==
=== Studio albums ===
Title	Album details	Peak chart positions	
Title	Album details	US	US Country
Rebecca Lynn Howard	Release date: May 2, 2000; Label: MCA Nashville	—	54
Forgive	Release date: September 10, 2002; Label: MCA Nashville	29	5
No Rules	Release date: June 17, 2008; Label: Saguaro Road	—	69
I'm Not Who You Think I Am	Release date: May 2, 2025; Label: Pump House	—	—
"—" denotes releases that did not chart

=== Singles ===
Single	Year	Peak chart positions			Album
Single	Year	US	US Country	CAN Country	Album
"When My Dreams Come True"	1999	—	65	84	Rebecca Lynn Howard
"Out Here in the Water"	2000	—	54	73	Rebecca Lynn Howard
"I Don't Paint Myself into Corners"	2000	—	71	58	Rebecca Lynn Howard
"Forgive"	2002	71	12	x	Forgive
"What a Shame"	2003	—	43	x	Laughter & Tears (unreleased)
"I Need a Vacation"	2003	—	49	x	Laughter & Tears (unreleased)
"That's Why I Hate Pontiacs"	2005	—	—	—	Alive and Well (unreleased)
"No One'll Ever Love Me"	2005	—	48	—	Alive and Well (unreleased)
"God Is in the House"	2007	—	—	—	Songs 4 Worship: Country
"What Dying Feels Like"	2008	—	—	—	No Rules
"A Good Place to Turn Around"	2020	—	—	—	I'm Not Who You Think I Am
"I Am My Mother"	2023	—	—	—	I'm Not Who You Think I Am
"I'm Not Who You Think I Am"	2023	—	—	—	I'm Not Who You Think I Am
"Hoedown"	2024	—	—	—	I'm Not Who You Think I Am
"Heart Still Does"	2025	—	—	—	I'm Not Who You Think I Am
"Seventeen"	2025	—	—	—	I'm Not Who You Think I Am
"Holler"	2025	—	—	—	I'm Not Who You Think I Am
"—" denotes releases that did not chart x denotes that no relevant chart existed at the time

==== As a featured artist ====
Single	Year	Peak chart positions	Album
Single	Year	US AC	Album
"Simple Things" (Jim Brickman with Rebecca Lynn Howard)	2001	1	Simple Things

=== Music videos ===
Year	Video	Director
1999	"When My Dreams Come True"	Deaton Flanigen
2000	"Out Here in the Water"	Guy Guillet
2002	"Forgive"	Morgan Lawley
2005	"That's Why I Hate Pontiacs"	
2005	"No One'll Ever Love Me"	Peter Zavadil

== Awards and nominations ==
Year	Organization	Award	Nominee/Work	Result
2003	Academy of Country Music Awards	Top New Female Vocalist	Rebecca Lynn Howard	Nominated
2003	Academy of Country Music Awards	Song of the Year	"Forgive"	Nominated
