= Simple Things (Jim Brickman song) =

Single by Jim Brickman

from the album Simple Things
- Released: August 13, 2001
- Length: 3:28
- Label: RCA
- Songwriters: Jim Brickman, Darrell Brown, Beth Neilson Chapman
- Producer: Darrell Brown

Jim Brickman singles chronology
"The Love I Found in You" (2000)	"Simple Things" (2001)	"A Mother's Day" (2002)

"Simple Things" is a song co-written and recorded by American singer-songwriter Jim Brickman. It was released in August 2001 as the lead single from the album of the same name. Brickman's co-writers were Darrell Brown and Beth Nielsen Chapman. Brickman performed the song with Rebecca Lynn Howard. The single was Brickman's eleventh chart release on the Adult Contemporary chart and his first number one. "Simple Things" spent one week at number one, but failed to chart on the Billboard Hot 100.

== Chart performance ==
Chart (2001)	Peak position
US Adult Contemporary (Billboard)	1
