= Trisha Yearwood discography =

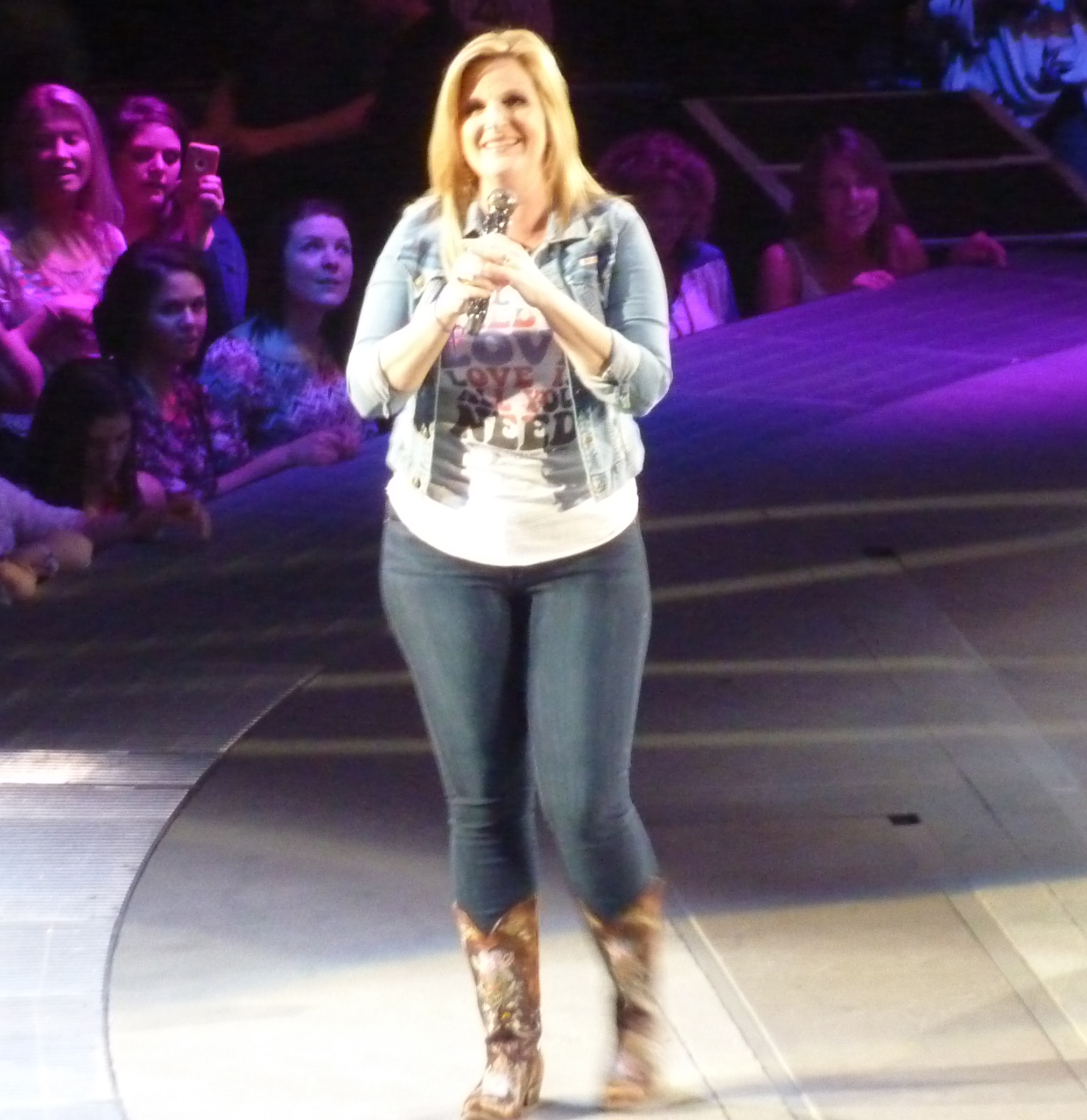
- Trisha Yearwood performing in Portland, Oregon, April 2015.
- Studio albums: 17
- Compilation albums: 9
- Singles: 57
- Video albums: 1
- Music videos: 43
- Other appearances: 30
- Other charted songs: 7

American country music artist Trisha Yearwood has released 16 studio albums, nine compilation albums, 43 music videos, 57 singles, 29 other charted songs and appeared on 30 albums. Yearwood's self-titled debut album was released in 1991, peaking at number 2 on the Billboard Top Country Albums chart and number 31 on the Billboard 200. It became the first debut female country album to sell one million copies, later certifying double platinum by the RIAA. The album would spawn an additional three singles, including "The Woman Before Me". Her second studio album was the critically acclaimed Hearts in Armor (1992). It spawned the top five country hits "Wrong Side of Memphis" and "Walkaway Joe". Her third studio record The Song Remembers When (1993) enjoyed similar success and the lead single reached number two on the Billboard country chart. A holiday album appeared before her platinum-selling fourth studio album Thinkin' About You (1995). Reaching number 3 on the country albums chart and number 28 on the Billboard 200, its first two singles topped the Hot Country Singles chart. Her sixth studio album Everybody Knows (1996) spawned Yearwood's fourth number one single, "Believe Me Baby (I Lied)".

Yearwood's first compilation album (Songbook) A Collection of Hits (1997) reached the top five of the Billboard 200, topped the Top Country Albums survey, and sold over four million copies in the United States. The lead single "How Do I Live" was first included on the soundtrack of the film Con Air. The song peaked at number 2 on the Billboard chart, peaked at number 23 on the Hot 100 and was internationally successful. Her country pop-flavored seventh studio album Where Your Road Leads followed in 1998 and spawned three top ten hits, including the lead single "There Goes My Baby". Real Live Woman (2000) was a more personal project that followed, peaking in the top five of the Top Country Albums chart. Yearwood then reached the top five of the country songs chart with "I Would've Loved You Anyway", the lead single from her number 1 studio album Inside Out (2001). She returned in 2005 with Jasper County, which certified gold in the United States and debuted at number 1 on the country albums chart. Following the release of her tenth studio record, Yearwood did not release new music until 2014's PrizeFighter: Hit After Hit. It debuted at number 7 on the country albums chart and featured six new songs. Her twelfth studio album and first with Garth Brooks debuted at number one on the Top Country Albums list, Christmas Together (2016). Yearwood released a Frank Sinatra tribute album Let's Be Frank in 2019. This was followed by 2019's "Every Girl in This Town", which became Yearwood's highest-debuting single, charting at number 21 on the Billboard Country Airplay chart.

== Albums ==
=== Studio albums ===
List of albums, with selected chart positions and certifications, showing other relevant details
Title	Album details	Peak chart positions							Certifications
Title	Album details	US	US Cou.	AUS	CAN	CAN Cou.	SWI	UK	Certifications
Trisha Yearwood	Released: July 2, 1991; Label: MCA; Formats: Cassette, LP, CD	31	2	164	—	6	—	—	MC: Gold; RIAA: 2× Platinum
Hearts in Armor	Released: September 1, 1992; Label: MCA; Formats: Cassette, CD	46	12	162	—	7	—	—	MC: Platinum; RIAA: Platinum
The Song Remembers When	Released: October 26, 1993; Label: MCA; Formats: Cassette, CD	40	6	114	—	18	—	—	MC: Gold; RIAA: Platinum
The Sweetest Gift	Released: September 13, 1994; Label: MCA; Formats: Cassette, CD	105	17	—	—	—	—	—	RIAA: Gold
Thinkin' About You	Released: February 14, 1995; Label: MCA; Formats: Cassette, CD	28	3	189	71	18	—	—	RIAA: Platinum
Everybody Knows	Released: August 27, 1996; Label: MCA; Formats: Cassette, CD	52	6	128	50	22	—	128	RIAA: Gold
Where Your Road Leads	Released: July 14, 1998; Label: MCA Nashville; Formats: Cassette, CD	33	3	32	41	2	50	36	MC: Gold; RIAA: Platinum
Real Live Woman	Released: March 28, 2000; Label: MCA Nashville; Formats: Cassette, CD	27	4	98	—	6	—	79	RIAA: Gold
Inside Out	Released: June 5, 2001; Label: MCA Nashville; Formats: Cassette, CD	29	1	167	—	—	—	117	RIAA: Gold
Jasper County	Released: September 13, 2005; Label: MCA Nashville; Formats: CD, digital	4	1	146	—	—	—	—	RIAA: Gold
Heaven, Heartache and the Power of Love	Released: November 13, 2007; Label: Big Machine; Formats: CD, digital	30	10	—	—	—	—	—	
PrizeFighter: Hit After Hit (re-recordings)	Released: November 17, 2014; Label: Gwendolyn/RCA Nashville; Formats: CD	33	7	—	—	—	—	—	
Christmas Together (with Garth Brooks)	Released: November 11, 2016; Label: Gwendolyn/Pearl; Formats: CD, digital	7	1	—	7	—	—	—	
Let's Be Frank (Note: Let's Be Frank peaked at number 2 on the Billboard Jazz Albums chart.)	Released: December 20, 2018 (Note: Originally released exclusively at Williams Sonoma stores and widely released on February 14, 2019.); Label: Gwendolyn; Formats: CD, digital, LP	—	—	—	—	—	—	—	
Every Girl	Released: August 30, 2019; Label: Gwendolyn; Formats: CD, LP, digital	57	5	—	—	—	—	—	
The Mirror	Released: July 18, 2025; Label: Gwendolyn/MCA Nashville/Virgin; Formats: CD, LP, digital	190	38	—	—	—	—	—	
Christmastime	Released: November 7, 2025; Label: Gwendolyn/Virgin; Formats: CD, LP, digital	—	—	—	—	—	—	—	
"—" denotes a recording that did not chart or was not released in that territory.

=== Compilation albums ===
List of albums, with selected chart positions and certifications, showing other relevant details
Title	Album details	Peak chart positions						Certifications
Title	Album details	US	US Cou.	AUS	CAN	CAN Cou.	UK	Certifications
(Songbook) A Collection of Hits	Released: August 26, 1997; Label: MCA Nashville; Formats: Cassette, CD	4	1	22	5	1	81	ARIA: Platinum; MC: 2× Platinum; RIAA: 4× Platinum
Home for the Holidays (featuring Point of Grace and the London Symphony Orchestra)	Released: October 1997; Label: Hallmark/MCA Nashville; Formats: Cassette, CD	—	—	—	—	—	—	
The Collection	Released: February 28, 2006; Label: Madacy; Formats: CD	—	—	—	—	—	—	
Greatest Hits	Released: September 11, 2007; Label: MCA Nashville; Formats: CD, download	22	2	—	—	—	—	
Love Songs	Released: January 15, 2008; Label: MCA Nashville; Formats: CD, download	—	35	—	—	—	—	
Icon	Released: August 31, 2010; Label: MCA Nashville; Formats: CD, download	—	69	—	—	—	—	
Ballads	Released: April 9, 2013; Label: MCA Nashville; Formats: CD, download	—	—	—	—	—	—	
Icon 2	Released: March 11, 2014; Label: MCA Nashville; Formats: CD	—	—	—	—	—	—	
Gunslinger / Christmas Together (with Garth Brooks)	Released: November 18, 2016; Label: Gwendolyn/Pearl; Formats: CD	21	3	—	—	—	—	
"—" denotes a recording that did not chart or was not released in that territory.

== Singles ==
=== As lead artist ===
List of singles, with selected chart positions and certifications, showing other relevant details
Title	Year	Peak chart positions									Certifications	Album
Title	Year	US	US AC	US Cou.	US Cou. Air.	AUS	CAN AC	CAN Cou. (Note: Chart positions from RPM Country Tracks from 1991 to 2000, Radio & Records Country Top 30 in 2005, and Billboard Canada Country in 2007.)	IRE	UK	Certifications	Album
"She's in Love with the Boy"	1991	—	—	1		—	—	1	—	—	RIAA: 2× Platinum	Trisha Yearwood
"Like We Never Had a Broken Heart" (Note: Garth Brooks is credited on the charts in Canada only.)	1991	—	—	4		—	—	7	—	—		Trisha Yearwood
"That's What I Like About You"	1991	—	—	8		—	—	4	—	—		Trisha Yearwood
"The Woman Before Me"	1992	—	—	4		—	—	12	—	—		Trisha Yearwood
"Wrong Side of Memphis"	1992	—	—	5		—	—	4	—	—		Hearts in Armor
"Walkaway Joe" (featuring Don Henley)	1992	—	—	2		180	30	2	—	—	RIAA: Gold	Hearts in Armor
"You Say You Will"	1993	—	—	12		—	—	24	—	—		Hearts in Armor
"Down on My Knees"	1993	—	—	19		—	—	21	—	—		Hearts in Armor
"The Song Remembers When"	1993	82	—	2		—	—	4	—	—		The Song; Remembers When
"Better Your Heart Than Mine"	1994	—	—	21		—	—	21	—	—		The Song; Remembers When
"I Fall to Pieces" (with Aaron Neville)	1994	—	—	72		159	—	—	—	—		Rhythm, Country and Blues
"XXX's and OOO's (An American Girl)"	1994	— (Note: "XXX's and OOO's (An American Girl)" did not enter the Hot 100, but peaked at number 14 on Bubbling Under Hot 100 Singles, which acts as a 25-song extension of the Hot 100.)	—	1		—	—	1	—	—	RIAA: Gold	Thinkin' About You
"Thinkin' About You"	1995	— (Note: "Thinkin' About You" did not enter the Hot 100, but peaked at number 20 on Bubbling Under Hot 100 Singles, which acts as a 25-song extension of the Hot 100.)	—	1		—	—	4	—	—		Thinkin' About You
"You Can Sleep While I Drive"	1995	—	—	23		—	—	26	—	—		Thinkin' About You
"I Wanna Go Too Far"	1995	—	—	9		—	—	25	—	—		Thinkin' About You
"On a Bus to St. Cloud"	1995	—	—	59		138	—	27	—	—		Thinkin' About You
"Believe Me Baby (I Lied)"	1996	—	—	1		—	—	1	—	—		Everybody Knows
"Everybody Knows"	1996	—	—	3		—	—	1	—	—		Everybody Knows
"I Need You"	1997	—	—	36		—	—	41	—	—		Everybody Knows
"How Do I Live"	1997	23	—	2		3	28	1	2	66	ARIA: 2× Platinum	(Songbook); A Collection of Hits
"In Another's Eyes" (with Garth Brooks)	1997	—	—	2		—	—	2	—	—		(Songbook); A Collection of Hits
"Perfect Love"	1998	—	—	1		—	—	1	—	—		(Songbook); A Collection of Hits
"There Goes My Baby"	1998	93	—	2		—	—	4	—	—		Where Your Road Leads
"Where Your Road Leads" (with Garth Brooks)	1998	—	—	18		—	—	18	—	—		Where Your Road Leads
"Powerful Thing"	1998	50	—	6		—	—	1	—	—		Where Your Road Leads
"I'll Still Love You More"	1999	65	—	10		183	—	6	—	—		Where Your Road Leads
"You're Where I Belong"	1999	—	—	71		145	81	73	—	—		Stuart Little: Music from and Inspired by the Motion Picture
"Real Live Woman"	2000	81	—	16		—	—	20	—	—		Real Live Woman
"Where Are You Now"	2000	—	—	45		—	—	42	—	—		Real Live Woman
"I Would've Loved You Anyway"	2001	44	—	4		—	—	—	—	—		Inside Out
"Inside Out" (with Don Henley)	2001	—	—	31		—	—	—	—	—		Inside Out
"I Don't Paint Myself into Corners"	2002	—	—	47		—	—	—	—	—		Inside Out
"Georgia Rain"	2005	78	—	15		—	—	22	—	—		Jasper County
"Trying to Love You"	2005	—	28	52		—	—	—	—	—		Jasper County
"Heaven, Heartache and the Power of Love"	2007	— (Note: "Heaven, Heartache and the Power of Love" did not enter the Hot 100, but peaked at number 7 on Bubbling Under Hot 100 Singles, which acts as a 25-song extension of the Hot 100.)	—	19		—	—	31	—	—		Heaven, Heartache and the Power of Love
"This Is Me You're Talking To"	2008	—	—	25		—	—	—	—	—		Heaven, Heartache and the Power of Love
"They Call It Falling for a Reason"	2008	—	—	54		—	—	—	—	—		Heaven, Heartache and the Power of Love
"PrizeFighter" (featuring Kelly Clarkson)	2014	—	—	—	42	—	—	—	—	—		PrizeFighter: Hit After Hit
"I Remember You"	2015	—	—	—	—	—	—	—	—	—		PrizeFighter: Hit After Hit
"Broken" (Note: "Broken" reached number 48 on the Billboard Hot Christian Songs chart.)	2016	—	17	—	—	—	—	—	—	—		The Passion: New Orleans
"Every Girl in This Town"	2019	—	—	49	21	—	—	—	—	—		Every Girl
"I'll Carry You Home"	2020	—	—	—	—	—	—	—	—	—		Every Girl
"The Mirror"	2025	—	—	—	—	—	—	—	—	—		The Mirror
"Christmastime Is Here"	2025	—	11	—	—	—	—	—	—	—		Christmastime
"—" denotes a recording that did not chart or was not released in that territory.

=== As a featured artist ===
List of singles, with selected chart positions, showing other relevant details
Title	Year	Peak chart positions						Album
Title	Year	US	US Cou.	US Cou. Air.	US Chr.	AUS	CAN Cou. (Note: Chart positions from Radio & Records Country Top 30 in 2005 and Billboard Canada Country in 2007.)	Album
"Hope" (as part of Hope: Country Music's Quest for a Cure) (Note: "Hope: Country Music's Quest for a Cure" was a multi-artist collaboration featuring John Berry, Terri Clark, Vince Gill, Faith Hill, Tracy Lawrence, Little Texas, Neal McCoy, Tim McGraw, Lorrie Morgan, Marty Stuart, Travis Tritt, and Trisha Yearwood.)	1997	—	57		—	—	—	Non-album single
"Squeeze Me In" (Garth Brooks with Trisha Yearwood)	2002	— (Note: "Squeeze Me In" did not enter the Hot 100, but peaked at number 2 on Bubbling Under Hot 100 Singles, which acts as a 25-song extension of the Hot 100.)	16		—	—	—	Scarecrow
"Tennessee Girl" (Kevin Montgomery with Trisha Yearwood)	2004	—	—	—	—	—	—	2:30am
"Love Will Always Win" (Garth Brooks with Trisha Yearwood)	2005	—	23		—	—	20	The Lost Sessions
"Another Try" (Josh Turner featuring Trisha Yearwood)	2008	96	15		—	—	45	Everything Is Fine
"Breaking Apart" (Chris Isaak with Trisha Yearwood)	2009	—	—	—	—	—	—	Mr. Lucky
"The Call" (Garth Brooks with Trisha Yearwood)	2013	—	—	49	—	—	—	Non-album single
"Words Can Break Your Heart" (Don Henley with Trisha Yearwood)	2015	—	—	—	—	—	—	Cass County
"Forever Country" (as part of Artists of Then, Now, and Forever) (Note: Released in 2016 via MCA Nashville in collaboration with several country artists under the name, "Artists of Now, Then & Forever". Among the other collaborators were Luke Bryan, Reba McEntire, and Dolly Parton. The single was released to celebrate the fiftieth anniversary of the Country Music Association Awards.)	2016	21	1	33	—	26	34	Non-album single
"Softly and Tenderly" (Reba McEntire featuring Kelly Clarkson and Trisha Yearwood)	2016	—	—	—	43	—	—	Sing It Now: Songs of Faith & Hope
"Shallow" (Garth Brooks with Trisha Yearwood)	2020	— (Note: "Shallow" did not enter the Hot 100, but peaked at number 7 on Bubbling Under Hot 100 Singles, which acts as a 25-song extension of the Hot 100.)	27	21	—	—	—	Fun
"—" denotes a recording that did not chart or was not released in that territory.

=== Promotional singles ===
List of singles issued in various formats, showing other relevant details
Title	Year	Album	Notes
"A Lover Is Forever"	1997	Everybody Knows	(Note: Issued as a promotional single in 1997 via MCA Records and was primarily promoted in the United Kingdom. "A Lover Is Forever" appeared on Yearwood's 1996 studio album Everybody Knows.)
"That Ain't the Way I Heard It"	1998	Where Your Road Leads	(Note: Issued as a promotional single in 1998 via MCA Records and was primarily promoted in the United Kingdom. "That Ain't the Way I Heard It" appeared on Yearwood's 1998 studio album Where Your Road Leads.)
"Sad Eyes"	2000	Real Live Woman	(Note: Released a promotional single via MCA Records.)
"Put It in a Song"	2024	Non-album Single	

== Other charted songs ==
List of songs, with selected chart positions, showing other relevant details
Title	Year	Peak chart positions				Album
Title	Year	US Coun.	US Coun. Air	US AC	CAN AC	Album
"It Wasn't His Child"	1994	60		—	—	The Sweetest Gift
"Wild as the Wind" (with Garth Brooks)	1998	60		—	—	Double Live
"Reindeer Boogie"	1999	63		—	—	The Sweetest Gift
"Santa on the Rooftop" (with Rosie O'Donnell)	1999	72		—	—	A Rosie Christmas
"Silent Night" (Kelly Clarkson featuring Reba McEntire and Trisha Yearwood)	2013	39	51	—	49	Wrapped in Red
"Santa Baby"	2016	—	60	19	—	Christmas Together
"Baby, It's Cold Outside" (with Garth Brooks)	2016	—	49	—	—	Christmas Together
"—" denotes a recording that did not chart or was not released in that territory.

== Videography ==
=== Video albums ===
Title	Details
The Song Remembers When: A Live Concert Performance	Released: October 27, 1993; Label: MCA; Formats: VHS

=== Music videos ===
List of music videos, showing year released and director
Title	Year	Director(s)	Ref.
"She's in Love with the Boy"	1991	Marc Ball	
"Like We Never Had a Broken Heart"	1991	Marc Ball	
"That's What I Like About You"	1991	Gerry Wenner	
"Wrong Side of Memphis"	1992	Gerry Wenner	
"Walkaway Joe" (featuring Don Henley)	1992	Gerry Wenner	
"Down on My Knees"	1993	Gerry Wenner	
"The Song Remembers When"	1993	Gerry Wenner	
"I Fall to Pieces" (with Aaron Neville)	1994	Charley Randazzo	
"It Wasn't His Child"	1994	Gerry Wenner	
"Thinkin' About You"	1995	Gerry Wenner	
"You Can Sleep While I Drive"	1995	Gerry Wenner	
"On a Bus to St. Cloud"	1996	Gerry Wenner	
"Believe Me Baby (I Lied)"	1996	Gerry Wenner	
"Everybody Knows"	1996	Gerry Wenner	
"I Need You"	1997	Gerry Wenner	
"How Do I Live"	1997	Chris Rogers	
"In Another's Eyes" (with Garth Brooks; concept version)	1997	Michael Salomon	
"In Another's Eyes" (with Garth Brooks; live version)	1997	Ellen Brown	
"Perfect Love"	1998	Gerry Wenner	
"There Goes My Baby"	1998	Randee St. Nicolas	
"That Ain't the Way I Heard It" (excerpt from Country Music Television)	1998	Matt Coale, Paul Reeves	
"Where Your Road Leads" (with Garth Brooks)	1998	Jon Small	
"I'll Still Love You More"	1999	Picture Vision	
"You're Where I Belong"	1999	Bille Woodruff	
"Real Live Woman"	2000	Morgan Lawley	
"Where Are You Now"	2000	Morgan Lawley	
"I Would've Loved You Anyway"	2001	Chris Rogers	
"Inside Out" (with Don Henley)	2001	Chris Rogers	
"Squeeze Me In" (with Garth Brooks)	2002	Jon Small	
"Georgia Rain"	2005	Rocky Schenck	
"Trying to Love You"	2005	Randee St. Nicolas	
"Heaven, Heartache and the Power of Love"	2007	Trey Fanjoy	
"This Is Me You're Talking To"	2008	Trey Fanjoy	
"Cowboys Are My Weakness"	2008	Eric Welch	
"The Call" (with Garth Brooks)	2013	Jon Small	
"Every Girl in This Town"	2019	Blythe Thomas	
"I'll Carry You Home"	2020	—N/a	
"The Mirror"	2025	—N/a	

=== Music video guest appearances ===
List of music videos, showing year released and director
Title	Year	Director(s)	Ref.
"He Thinks He'll Keep Her" (Mary Chapin Carpenter featuring Suzy Bogguss, Emmylou Harris, Patty Loveless, Kathy Mattea, Pam Tillis, and Trisha Yearwood; Live)	1994	Bud Schaetzle	
"On My Own" (Reba McEntire featuring Martina McBride, Linda Davis, and Trisha Yearwood)	1995	Dominic Orlando	
"Back in the Saddle" (Matraca Berg with Suzy Bogguss, Faith Hill, Patty Loveless, Martina McBride, and Trisha Yearwood)	1998	—N/a	
"Tennessee Girl" (Kevin Montgomery with Trisha Yearwood)	2005	Ross Wood	
"Silent Night" (Kelly Clarkson with Reba McEntire and Trisha Yearwood)	2015	Hamish Hamilton	
"Forever Country" (credited as various artists)	2016	Joseph Kahn	
"Rockin' Around the Christmas Tree" (Brenda Lee featuring Tanya Tucker and Trisha Yearwood)	2023	Running Bear	

== Other appearances ==
List of non-single guest appearances, with other performing artists, showing year released and album name
Title	Year	Other artist(s)	Album	Ref.
"(You're the) Devil in Disguise"	1992	—N/a	Honeymoon in Vegas: Music from the Original Motion Picture Soundtrack	
"Bartender Blues"	1994	George Jones	The Bradley Barn Sessions	
"New Kid in Town"	1994	—N/a	Common Thread: The Songs of the Eagles	
"I Can't Understand"	1994	—N/a	The Thing Called Love: Music from the Paramount Motion Picture Soundtrack	
"Somethin' Stupid"	1995	The Mavericks	Music for All Occasions	
"Don't Fence Me In"	1995	Shelby Lynne; Lari White	Don't Fence Me In	
"Coming Back to You"	1995	—N/a	Tower of Song: The Songs of Leonard Cohen	
"Flame"	1996	—N/a	One Voice: An Olympic Album	
"I Have a Love"	1996	—N/a	The Songs of West Side Story	
"The Honor of Your Name"	1998	—N/a	Civil War: The Nashville Sessions	
"To Make You Feel My Love"	1998	—N/a	Hope Floats: Music from the Motion Picture	
"'Til I Get It Right"	1998	—N/a	Tammy Wynette Remembered	
"Something So Right"	1999	—N/a	For Love of the Game: Music from the Motion Picture	
"When Two Worlds Collide"	1999	John Prine	In Spite of Ourselves	
"Follow the Wind"	1999	—N/a	Life: Music Inspired by the Motion Picture	
"For Only You"	2000	—N/a	Sex and the City: Music from the HBO Series	
"Wrong Side of Memphis"	2000	—N/a	Farm Aid: Keep America Growin'	
"Deep Blue Heart"	2000	John Mellencamp	Cuttin' Heads	
"The Old Man's Back in Town"	2004	—N/a	Kenny Rogers Christmas Special: Keep Christmas with You	
"Tennessee Girl"	2004	Kevin Montgomery	2:30 am	
"This Memory of You"	2006	Vince Gill	These Days	
"She Can't Save Him"	2007	Reba McEntire	Reba: Duets	
"Blue Beyond"	2008	—N/a	Country Sings Disney	
"After the Fire Is Gone"	2013	Garth Brooks	Blame It All on My Roots: Five Decades of Influences	
"Forever's as Far as I'll Go"	2013	Alabama	Alabama & Friends	
"My Love Is Your Love"	2015	—N/a	The Passion: New Orleans - Music From the Live Television Event	
"You'll Never Walk Alone"	2015	—N/a	The Passion: New Orleans - Music From the Live Television Event	
"Hands"	2015	—N/a	The Passion: New Orleans - Music From the Live Television Event	
"Where I Am Now"	2015	Don Henley	Cass County	
"Praying for Rain"	2015	Don Henley; Molly Felder; Vince Gill; Alison Krauss; Ashley Monroe	Cass County	
"Whiskey to Wine"	2016	Garth Brooks	Gunslinger	
"Maggie's Dream"	2017	—N/a	Gentle Giants: The Songs of Don Williams	
"Getting Good"	2020	Lauren Alaina	Sitting Pretty on Top of the World	
"Cry Myself to Sleep"	2023	Wynonna	A Tribute to The Judds	
