= The Song Remembers When: A Live Concert Performance =

Video by Trisha Yearwood
- Released: October 27, 1993
- Recorded: June 1993
- Venue: Tennessee Performing Arts Center
- Genre: Country; country pop
- Length: 60:00
- Label: MCA

Trisha Yearwood chronology
The Song Remembers When (1993)	The Song Remembers When: A Live Concert Performance (1993)	The Sweetest Gift (1994)

The Song Remembers When: A Live Concert Performance is a video album by American country artist Trisha Yearwood. It was released on October 27, 1993, via MCA Records and was issued as a VHS. The album was recorded live earlier that year at a performing arts center. It included previously recorded material and new songs as well.

== Background, content and release ==
The Song Remembers When: A Live Concert Performance was recorded in June 1993 at the Tennessee Performing Arts Center. It contained 14 tracks, which totaled to 60 minutes. The tracks were live concert video footage from that day. The project was produced by Joseph Sassone and directed by Steve Purcell. Although recorded live, several of the tracks originally appeared on Yearwood's first three studio albums for MCA Records: Trisha Yearwood (1991), Hearts in Armor (1992) and The Song Remembers When (1993).

Two of the album's tracks recorded that day did not originally appear on the latter releases: "I Never Will Marry" and "Love Has No Pride." Both songs were notably recorded by Linda Ronstadt, whom Yearwood drew musical aspirations from in her career.

The project was released on October 27, 1993, via MCA Records. It was her first video album release and her only video effort to date. It was issued as a VHS and was distributed by LaserDisc. The album was released in conjunction with the promotion of her third studio album, also titled The Song Remembers When. The video footage for the title track from this album was later included in its music video. The album did not chart on any major Billboard publications following its release in 1993.

== Track listing ==
The track listing is adapted from the liner notes of The Song Remembers When.

1. "I Never Will Marry"
2. "Wrong Side of Memphis"
3. "Mr. Radio"
4. "The Woman Before Me"
5. "You Say You Will"
6. "The Song Remembers When"
7. "One in a Row"
8. "That's What I Like About You"
9. "Down on My Knees"
10. "Better Your Heart Than Mine"
11. "Love Has No Pride"
12. "She's in Love with the Boy"
13. "Walkaway Joe"
14. "Hearts in Armor"

== Personnel ==
All credits are adapted from the liner notes of The Song Remembers When.

- Garth Fundis – music producer
- Steve Galloway – executive producer
- Daniel Pearl – director of photography
- Steve Purcell – director
- Joseph Sassone – producer
- Trisha Yearwood – lead vocals

== Release history ==
Region	Date	Format	Label	Ref.
United States	October 27, 1993	VHS	MCA Records	
