= Feels Like Home (Linda Ronstadt album) =

Studio album by Linda Ronstadt
- Released: March 14, 1995
- Recorded: 1994
- Genre: Country rock
- Length: 39:26
- Label: Elektra
- Producers: George Massenburg, Linda Ronstadt

Linda Ronstadt chronology
Winter Light (1993)	Feels Like Home (1995)	Dedicated to the One I Love (1996)

Singles from Feels Like Home
- 1. "The Blue Train" Released: March 1995; 2. "Walk On" Released: April 1995; 3. "The Waiting" Released: 1995; 4. "High Sierra" Released: August 1995

Feels Like Home is a studio album by American singer Linda Ronstadt released in 1995. It reached #75 and lasted 12 weeks on the Billboard album chart. It received excellent critical reviews upon release. According to Nielsen SoundScan, the disc sold 188,815 copies in the United States. This album is now out of print physically, although it is available digitally and five of its tracks were remixed and subsequently included on Trio II.

A double sided single, Tom Petty's "The Waiting" and "Walk On", was released simultaneously with the album. "Walk On" returned Linda to the Billboard Country Singles chart for the first time as a solo artist (not counting the late 1980s 'Trio' hits) since 1983. The song was previously recorded by Matraca Berg on her 1990 debut album Lying to the Moon.

Adult Contemporary radio picked up the album track "The Blue Train" which reached 31 on that chart and lasted for ten weeks in the chart's Top 40. Album track "Feels Like Home" was incorporated into Randy Newman's musical Randy Newman's Faust, which opened later in 1995, and has been subsequently covered by a number of artists.

== Reception ==
Professional ratings
Review scores
Source	Rating
AllMusic	3/5 stars
Chicago Tribune	2.5/4 stars
Entertainment Weekly	A−
NME	2/10
Rolling Stone	4/5 stars

Music critic Jose Promis called the album a "return to her country-rock roots" in his Allmusic review, writing: "… the final result is an album that is top-quality but a little bland. Ronstadt's voice is nothing short of stellar, and the songs are fine, but there is a certain immediacy that is lacking in this album, especially toward the end, when it just seems to drift... this is top-quality material, but one can't help but pine for the punch and perfect production of her previous pop packages."

== Track listing ==
No.	Title	Writer(s)	Length
1.	"The Waiting"	Tom Petty	3:58
2.	"Walk On"	Matraca Berg, Ronnie Samoset	2:58
3.	"High Sierra"	Harley Allen	4:24
4.	"After the Gold Rush"	Neil Young	3:33
5.	"The Blue Train"	Jennifer Kimball, Tom Kimmel	5:04
6.	"Feels Like Home"	Randy Newman	4:50
7.	"Teardrops Will Fall"	Eddie Deane	3:08
8.	"Morning Blues"	Traditional	3:57
9.	"Women 'Cross the River"	David Olney	3:33
10.	"Lover's Return"	A.P. Carter	4:01
Total length:			39:26

== Personnel ==
- Linda Ronstadt – lead vocals, arrangements (4, 5), orchestra arrangements (4), backing vocals (4–6)
- Robbie Buchanan – Hammond B3 organ (1, 6), acoustic piano (4, 6), synth strings (4), voice (4), electric piano (7), synthesizers (9)
- Booker T. Jones – Hammond B3 organ (7)
- Dean Parks – acoustic guitar (1, 2, 9), electric guitar (1, 2, 5–8), mandolins (1), ukulele (9)
- Mark Casstevens – acoustic guitar (3, 5, 6, 10)
- David Grisman – mandolin (3, 6, 8, 10)
- Ben Keith – pedal steel guitar (3, 5, 9)
- Roy Rogers – National slide guitar (7)
- Mike Auldridge – dobro (8, 9)
- Bob Glaub – bass guitar (1, 2, 7–9)
- Roy Huskey, Jr. – acoustic bass guitar (3), acoustic bass (10)
- Leland Sklar – bass guitar (5, 6)
- Jim Keltner – drums (1, 5–9), percussion (1, 5)
- Russ Kunkel – drums (2)
- Larry Atamanuik – drums (3, 10)
- Alison Krauss – fiddle (2, 10)
- Dennis James – glass harmonica (4)
- David Lindley – autoharp (10)
- David Campbell – orchestra arrangements and conductor (4, 6)
- Stuart Canin – concertmaster (4, 6)
- The Skywalker Symphony Orchestra – orchestra (4, 6)
- Herb Pedersen – backing vocals (1, 2)
- Carl Jackson – backing vocals (1, 2, 7–9), acoustic guitar (3, 10)
- Claire Lynch – backing vocals (3, 10)
- John Ronstadt – backing vocals (3)
- Valerie Carter – backing vocals (4)
- Emmylou Harris – backing vocals (4–6, 10)
- Craig Fuller – backing vocals (7, 9)
- John Starling – backing vocals (7–9), acoustic guitar (10)

== Production ==
- George Massenburg – producer, engineer, mixing
- Linda Ronstadt – producer, mixing
- Nathaniel Kunkel – engineer
- Sean O'Dwyer – assistant engineer
- Gil Morales – assistant engineer
- Ron Lewter – mastering
- Doug Sax – mastering
- Gavin Lurssen – mastering
- John Allair – piano technician
- Gail Rosman – production coordinator
- John Kosh – art direction, design
- Robert Blakeman – photography
- Greg Sudmeier – orchestra coordinator
- Ira Koslow – management

Studios

- Recorded at Jim Brady Recording Studios (Tucson, AZ); The Site and Skywalker Ranch (Marin County, CA); Studio F (Los Angeles, CA); Conway Studios (Hollywood, CA).
- Mastered at The Mastering Lab (Hollywood, CA).

== Charts ==
Chart (1995)	Peak position
Australian Albums (ARIA)	140

== Release history ==
Release history and formats for Feels Like Home
Region	Date	Format	Label	Ref.
North America	March 14, 1995	CD; cassette	Elektra Records	
