= Becky Priest =

American country music singer-songwriter and musician

- Origin: Hubbard, Texas, U.S.
- Genre: Country
- Occupations: Singer-songwriter, performer, keyboardist, vocal arranger
- Instruments: Vocals, keyboards, rhythm guitar, mandolin, accordion
- Labels: Asylum-Curb, MCA, Epic

Becky Priest is an American country music singer-songwriter and instrumentalist hailing from Hubbard, Texas and now based in Nashville, Tennessee.

Since moving to Nashville in 1992, Priest has toured over 26 countries as both primary artist and with many artists including Neal McCoy, Trisha Yearwood, Patty Loveless, Pam Tillis, Mel Tillis, Mel Tillis, Jr., Carrie April Tillis, Vince Gill, Alabama, Garth Brooks, Michael McDonald, Christopher Cross, Liza Minnelli, Engelbert Humperdinck, Huey Lewis and the News, Jim Peterik & The Ides of March, Lou Gramm of Foreigner, Foghat, 38 Special, Lynyrd Skynyrd, Chuck Negron of Three Dog Night and Whose Line Is It Anyway comedian/entertainer, Wayne Brady.

== Musical biography ==
=== Current engagement ===
Becky Priest will start 2009 as Bandleader, (considered groundbreaking for women musicians in Country Music), and Keyboardist/Background Vocalist for Neal McCoy, former Entertainer of the Year Award Winner, and Academy of Country Music's Humanitarian Award recipient.

=== Prior engagements ===
==== Cowboy Crush ====
Priest was a founding member of the all-female band Cowboy Crush, originally signed in 2003 to Curb/Asylum Records in Nashville, Tennessee. While a member of Cowboy Crush Priest performed all high harmonies, and the majority of the piano, Hammond B3 and synthesizer tracks on Cowboy Crush's eleven Curb/Asylum recordings. During the five years Cowboy Crush was signed to Curb/Asylum and touring, Becky also held the positions of bandleader, main harmony vocalist, keyboardist and acoustic guitarist.

Priest's vocal arranging skills are attributed to earning Cowboy Crush their nationally televised appearance on the NASCAR Budweiser Shootout to perform her arrangement of "The Star-Spangled Banner", live in Daytona, Florida in February 2007. Event attendance numbered approximately 100,000 with television viewership estimated at over 8 million.

As a member of Cowboy Crush, Priest gave numerous performances overseas for members of the U.S. military. Cowboy Crush's recording of "He's Coming Home" was received highly by the United States Army which chose to fund, cast and film the accompanying video. The video was released internationally and Priest has stated publicly that it was "...one of her proudest moments to have participated in a recording and video that helped raise the morale of our wonderful Men and Women of our Armed Forces".

Additionally, Priest with Cowboy Crush opened shows for some of the best known names in country music, including Charlie Daniels, Trace Adkins, Reba McEntire, Rascal Flatts, Big & Rich, Dierks Bentley and others.

==== Trisha Yearwood ====
Prior to co-founding Cowboy Crush Priest worked with numerous well known Country Artists. Eight months after arriving in Nashville her initial engagement was with multiple Grammy award winner, Trisha Yearwood. This engagement was to last three years and led to numerous nationally televised appearances including, Late Night with David Letterman, The Tonight Show with Jay Leno. Priest also graced stages of top level productions of not only the Ryman Auditorium, the Grand Ole Opry, Music City Tonight, The Crook & Chase Show, Good Morning America, The Today Show, but also New York City's Radio City Music Hall and London's Albert Hall. Along with these appearances Becky performed for a number of Symphony shows with Yearwood, including an exclusive special shot in Daytona, Florida with the London Philharmonic. One of the special highlights of her period of performing with Yearwood, occurred June 23, 1994, when she and Yearwood's band entertained President Clinton and First Lady, Hillary Clinton, for a Command Performance at The White House.

==== Pam Tillis ====
Following her years with Trisha Yearwood, Priest performed nationally with Grammy Award winning, Pam Tillis in the United States and toured in Australia. Television performances with Tillis included Grand Ole Opry Live, The Tonight Show with Jay Leno and additional Symphony dates.

Recently, Priest rejoined with Pam Tillis for a six-week engagement with Pam Tillis, sister Carrie April Tillis, brother Mel Tillis, Jr. and legendary Country Music Hall of Fame Member, Mel Tillis. Priest will also perform with The Tillis Clan in their first Tillis Family Christmas Tour, year end 2008.

==== Video appearances ====
Priest has appeared in several videos including Patty Loveless' video, Lovin' All Night, and Neal McCoy's video, Billy's Got His Beer Goggles On, with actor Rob Schneider and famous 'animal guy', Jack Hanna. Becky also appeared in her first video as a 'signed Artist' in the summer of 2005, when Cowboy Crush premiered their video, Nobody Ever Died of a Broken Heart. It made it to the number 17 spot on GAC's Top Twenty Countdown.

== Discography ==
=== Albums ===
Year	Album	Artist	Song	Parts
1994	The Sweetest Gift	Trisha Yearwood	Santa Claus Is Back in Town	Piano
1996	Everybody Knows	Trisha Yearwood	Hello, I'm Gone	Background Vocals
1996	Best of Austin City Limits: Country Music's Finest Hour	Various Artists	XXX's and OOO's (An American Girl)	Piano, Background Vocals
2000	Roadtrip	Gary P Nunn	(All Tracks on Album)	Piano, Background Vocals
2006	Papa was a Fishin' Man	The World's Greatest Fishing Band	Breathing Room	Background Vocals

=== Music videos ===
Year	Artist	Song	Director
2003	Patty Loveless	"Lovin' All Night"	Roger Pistole
2005	Cowboy Crush	"Nobody Ever Died of a Broken Heart"	
2005	Neal McCoy	"Billy's Got His Beer Goggles On"	

== Television appearances ==
- Late Night with David Letterman
- The Tonight Show with Jay Leno
- Late Night with Conan O'Brien
- Good Morning America
- The Today Show
- Regis and Kathy Lee
- Ali and Jack
- CMT's Most Wanted Live
- Austin City Limits
- Prime Time Country
- Music City Tonight
- Countryfest
- 2007 NASCAR's Budweiser Shootout in Daytona
- numerous CMA Award Shows
- The Grand Ole Opry
