= The Sweetest Gift =

The Sweetest Gift may refer to:

== Songs ==
- "The Sweetest Gift", a 1975 duet by Linda Ronstadt and Emmylou Harris
- "The Sweetest Gift", a 2000 song by Sade from their album Lovers Rock

== Albums ==
- The Sweetest Gift (Big Tom and The Mainliners album)
- The Sweetest Gift (Trisha Yearwood album)
