= Lying to the Moon =

Studio album by Matraca Berg
- Released: September 25, 1990
- Studio: Sound Emporium Studios, Recording Arts, Sound Stage Studios, Emerald Sound Studios and Masterfonics (Nashville, Tennessee)
- Genre: Country
- Length: 41:53
- Label: RCA Nashville
- Producer: Josh Leo; Wendy Waldman

Matraca Berg chronology
Lying to the Moon (1990)	The Speed of Grace (1993)

Singles from Lying to the Moon
- 1. "Baby, Walk On" Released: June 9, 1990; 2. "The Things You Left Undone" Released: September 8, 1990; 3. "I Got It Bad" Released: January 1991; 4. "I Must Have Been Crazy" Released: May 1991

Lying to the Moon is the debut studio album of American country music singer Matraca Berg. It was released in September 1990 via RCA Records Nashville. The album accounted for the singles "Baby, Walk On", "The Things You Left Undone", "I Got It Bad", and "I Must Have Been Crazy". Berg co-wrote all ten of the tracks.

== Content ==
The album's first two singles, "Baby, Walk On" and "The Things You Left Undone," both peaked at 36 on the Billboard Hot Country Singles & Tracks (now Hot Country Songs) charts. Following these were "I Got It Bad" and "I Must Have Been Crazy" at 43 and 55 respectively. The album itself reached number 43 on Top Country Albums.

"Baby, Walk On" was later recorded as "Walk On" by Linda Ronstadt on her 1995 album Feels Like Home. Trisha Yearwood recorded the title track on her 1993 album The Song Remembers When. Pam Tillis recorded "Calico Plains" for her 1994 CD "Sweethearts Dance"

== Critical reception ==
Mark A. Humphrey of Allmusic gave the album four-and-a-half stars out of five, saying that she "sometimes delivers with brio." Alanna Nash of Entertainment Weekly rated it A-plus, saying that "Berg proves herself to be a songwriter of uncommon maturity" and calling her "unquestionably the first true country femme fatale of the '90s."

== Track listing ==
All songs written by Matraca Berg and Ronnie Samoset except where noted.

No.	Title	Writer(s)	Length
1.	"The Things You Left Undone"		2:56
2.	"I Got It Bad"	Berg, Jim Photoglo	3:36
3.	"Lying to the Moon"		3:49
4.	"I Must Have Been Crazy"		3:05
5.	"You Are the Storm"		4:14
6.	"Calico Plains"	Berg, Michael Noble	3:40
7.	"Appalachian Rain"		3:39
8.	"Baby, Walk On"		3:08
9.	"Alice in the Looking Glass"		3:36
10.	"Dancin' on the Wire"	Berg, Josh Leo, Wendy Waldman	3:30

== Personnel ==
As listed in liner notes.

- Matraca Berg – vocals
- Gary Prim – keyboards
- Bernie Leadon – acoustic guitar, banjo, mandolin, mandola, mandocello
- Josh Leo – acoustic guitar
- Biff Watson – acoustic guitar
- John Willis – acoustic guitar, electric guitars
- Sam Bush – mandolin, fiddle
- Bruce Bouton – steel guitar, dobro, Weissenborn Hawaiian guitar
- Dan Dugmore – steel guitar, dobro
- Willie Weeks – bass guitar, "cheap fretless bass"
- Harry Stinson – drums, percussion, backing vocals
- Rob Hajacos – fiddle
- Lisa Silver – fiddle
- John Catchings – cello
- Mark O'Connor – viola, violin
- Bobby Taylor – oboe
- Clara Callaway – backing vocals
- Coleida Callaway – backing vocals
- Sudie Callaway – backing vocals
- Ashley Cleveland – backing vocals
- Emmylou Harris – backing vocals
- Tracy Nelson – backing vocals
- Wendy Waldman – backing vocals

=== Production ===
- Pat Higdon – executive producer
- Tabitha Dycus – A&R direction
- Josh Leo – producer
- Wendy Waldman – producer
- Stephen Tillisch – engineer, mixing (2–6, 9, 10)
- Steve Marcantonio – mixing (1, 7, 8)
- Jeff Coppage – assistant engineer, mix assistant (2–6, 9, 10)
- Tim Kish – assistant engineer
- Jeff Giedt – mix assistant (1, 7, 8)
- Denny Purcell – mastering at Georgetown Masters (Nashville, Tennessee)
- Lauren Koch – production coordinator
- Mary Hamilton – art direction
- Diane Painter – design
- Peter Nash – photography
- Matraca Berg – liner notes
- Chuck Flood & Associates – management

== Chart performance ==
Chart (1990)	Peak position
U.S. Billboard Top Country Albums	43
