= The Things You Left Undone =

Single by Matraca Berg

from the album Lying to the Moon
- B-side: "Dancin' on the Wire"
- Released: September 8, 1990
- Genre: Country
- Length: 2:56
- Label: RCA Nashville
- Songwriters: Matraca Berg, Ronnie Samoset
- Producers: Wendy Waldman, Josh Leo

Matraca Berg singles chronology
"Baby, Walk On" (1990)	"The Things You Left Undone" (1990)	"I Got It Bad" (1990)

"The Things You Left Undone" is a song co-written and recorded by American country music artist Matraca Berg. It was released in September 1990 as the second single from the album Lying to the Moon. The song reached No. 36 on the Billboard Hot Country Singles & Tracks chart. The song was written by Berg and Ronnie Samoset.

== Critical reception ==
A review in Gavin Report was favorable, stating that Berg is "an extraordinary songwriter who captures your attention with her storytelling" and that the song "is sure to win her new fans. "

== Chart performance ==
Chart (1990)	Peak position
US Hot Country Songs (Billboard)	36
Canadian RPM Country Tracks	44
