= Baby, Walk On =

Single by Matraca Berg

from the album Lying to the Moon
- Released: June 9, 1990
- Genre: Country
- Length: 3:08
- Label: RCA Nashville
- Songwriters: Matraca Berg, Ronnie Samoset
- Producers: Wendy Waldman, Josh Leo

Matraca Berg singles chronology
| "Baby, Walk On" (1990) | "The Things You Left Undone" (1990) |

"Baby, Walk On" is a song originally recorded by American country music singer Matraca Berg. It was her first single release, and it appears on her 1990 debut album Lying to the Moon. A second version, titled just "Walk On", was released by Linda Ronstadt in 1995.

== History ==
As with most of the tracks on Lying to the Moon, Berg wrote the song with Ronnie Samoset, with Josh Leo and Wendy Waldman as producers. Instead of a B-side, the commercial single release featured three snippets from the album. Berg's version was also the B-side of her 1991 single "It's Easy to Tell".

== Critical reception ==
Kimmy Wix of Cash Box reviewed Berg's version with favor, stating that "an energy-boosting time that says 'If you're gonna walk, take big steps!'" and that it "not only flaunts Berg's driving vocals, but gives us a tune full of deep-boppin' music, as well as a message with which we can easily relate."

== Linda Ronstadt version ==
Linda Ronstadt recorded the song under the title "Walk On" in 1995. Her version, appearing on the album Feels Like Home for Elektra Records, features Alison Krauss on backing vocals. Ronstadt's version also charted in 1995, with "The Waiting" on the B-side.

A review in Billboard of Ronstadt's version was favorable, stating that it "gives this progenitor a chance to fully strut her vocal stuff."

== Chart performance ==
=== Matraca Berg ===
| Chart (1990) | Peak position |
|---|---|
| US Hot Country Songs (Billboard) | 36 |
| Canadian RPM Country Tracks | 61 |

=== Linda Ronstadt ===
| Chart (1995) | Peak position |
|---|---|
| US Hot Country Songs (Billboard) | 61 |
| Canadian RPM Country Tracks | 62 |
