= Cowboy Crush =

American country music band

- Origin: Nashville, Tennessee, United States
- Genres: Country
- Years active: 2003—2009
- Labels: Asylum-Curb
- Past members: Trenna Barnes; Debbie Johnson; Darla Perlozzi; Becky Priest; Renaé Truex

Cowboy Crush was an American country music all-female band. Signed to Curb Records' Asylum/Curb division, the band was composed of Trenna Barnes (lead vocals), Debbie Johnson (bass guitar, vocals), Becky Priest (keyboards, vocals), and Renaé Truex (fiddle, mandolin). Until 2006, Darla Perlozzi (drums) was also a member of the group. Perlozzi co-wrote Big & Rich's 2007 single "Loud".

All five founding members of Cowboy Crush had previously worked throughout Nashville, Tennessee before meeting at Belmont University. They held their first practice together in a garage on March 18, 2003. Cowboy Crush is also known for its high-energy concerts and backstage antics. The group's debut single, "Nobody Ever Died of a Broken Heart", was previously recorded by Trick Pony. Cowboy Crush's debut album was released to digital retailers on July 14, 2009.

== Discography ==
=== Studio albums ===
Title	Album details
Cowboy Crush	Release date: July 14, 2009; Label: Curb Records

=== Singles ===
Year	Single	Peak positions
Year	Single	US Country
2005	"Nobody Ever Died of a Broken Heart"	56
2005	"He's Coming Home"	—
2006	"Hillbilly Nation"	—
2007	"Some Men Don't Cheat"	—
2007	"Miss Difficult"	—
2009	"Tougher Than a Man"	—
2009	"Hillbilly Soldier"	—
"—" denotes releases that did not chart

=== Music videos ===
Year	Video	Director
2005	"Nobody Ever Died of a Broken Heart"	Eric Welch
2007	"Miss Difficult"	
