= Where Are You Now (Trisha Yearwood song) =

Single by Trisha Yearwood

from the album Real Live Woman
- B-side: "Some Days"
- Released: June 12, 2000
- Recorded: November 1999
- Studio: Sound Emporium (Nashville, Tennessee)
- Genre: Contemporary country
- Length: 3:09
- Label: MCA Nashville
- Songwriters: Mary Chapin Carpenter; Kim Richey
- Producers: Garth Fundis; Trisha Yearwood

Trisha Yearwood singles chronology
"Real Live Woman" (2000)	"Where Are You Now" (2000)	"I Would've Loved You Anyway" (2001)

"Where Are You Now" is a song written by Mary Chapin Carpenter and Kim Richey. It was originally recorded by American country artist Trisha Yearwood for her 2000 studio album, Real Live Woman. It was released as the album's second single in 2000 via MCA Records. That year, the song became a charting hit on the Billboard country songs survey.

== Background and content ==
"Where Are You Now" was written by country artist Mary Chapin Carpenter and songwriter Kim Richey. In 2000, it was described by Billboard magazine as being a song about the aftermath of a breakup. According to an interview with Kim Richey, the pair composed the song while they were touring on the road together. Richey had previously written Trisha Yearwood's number one single, "Believe Me Baby (I Lied)", in 1996. "Where Are You Now" was recorded in November 1999 at the Sound Emporium, a studio located in Nashville, Tennessee. At this same studio, Yearwood also recorded the rest of her Real Live Woman album. The session was produced by Garth Fundis and Yearwood herself. Fundis was her long-time producer on the MCA record label.

== Critical reception ==
Since its release, "Where Are You Now" has received positive reception from writers and critics. Billboard magazine reviewed the song in June 2000 and inserted it onto their "spotlight" section of their reviews page. Writers praised Yearwood's vocals in their review: "Yearwood's vocal echoes wistful regret but demonstrates the resilience of a woman who might rather be part of a couple but can definitely stand strong on her own." Stephen Thomas Erlewine of Allmusic named the song one of his "album picks" when reviewing Yearwood's 2000 album. Mark Jennett of Culture Vulture also gave the song a positive response, calling it a "rocker" in his review of Real Live Woman.

== Release and music video ==
"Where Are You Now" was released first on Yearwood's 2000 studio album, Real Live Woman, in March 2000. In May 2000, the song was released as the album's second single via MCA Nashville Records. It was issued as a CD single containing a B-side, "Some Days." It spent a total of 13 weeks on the Billboard Hot Country Songs chart before peaking at number 45 that August. It was Yearwood's third single release to miss the Billboard country top 40. On the Canadian RPM Country Songs chart, "Where Are You Now" reached a similar position, peaking at number 42. That year, a music video of the song was later released. The video was directed by Morgan Lawley, who also directed the video for Yearwood's previous single release. To promote the single, Yearwood performed "Where Are You Now" on the 2000 Country Music Association Awards, along with Mary Chapin Carpenter and Kim Richey. "It was a blast. I remember that night. We had such a great time singing it," Richey recalled of the performance.

== Track listing ==
CD single

- "Where Are You Now" – 3:09
- "Some Days" – 3:51

== Charts ==
Chart (2000)	Peak position
Canada Country Songs (RPM)	42
US Hot Country Songs (Billboard)	45
