= Everybody Knows (Trisha Yearwood album) =

Studio album by Trisha Yearwood
- Released: August 27, 1996
- Recorded: 1996
- Studios: Sound Emporium (Nashville, Tennessee, USA); Soundstage (Toronto, Ontario, Canada)
- Genres: Country, country pop
- Length: 38:27
- Label: MCA Nashville
- Producer: Garth Fundis

Trisha Yearwood chronology
Thinkin' About You (1995)	Everybody Knows (1996)	(Songbook) A Collection of Hits (1997)

Singles from Everybody Knows
- 1. "Believe Me Baby (I Lied)" Released: July 2, 1996; 2. "Everybody Knows" Released: October 28, 1996; 3. "I Need You" Released: March 1, 1997

Professional ratings
Review scores
Source	Rating
AllMusic	3/5 stars
Chicago Tribune	3/4 stars
Robert Christgau	B
Entertainment Weekly	B+
Q	3/5 stars
(The New) Rolling Stone Album Guide	3/5 stars

Everybody Knows is the sixth studio album by American country music artist Trisha Yearwood, containing country pop-styled ballads.

The album reached #6 on the Billboard country albums chart. The album produced the fourth Billboard country Number One hit of her career in "Believe Me Baby (I Lied)", as well as a #3 in its title track, and a #36 in "I Need You".The album was also nominated for the CMA Album of the Year award.

== Track listing ==
1. "I Want to Live Again" (Tom Shapiro, George Teren) – 3:05
2. "It's Alright" (Gary Nicholson, Jamie O'Hara) – 3:13
3. "Believe Me Baby (I Lied)" (Larry Gottlieb, Kim Richey, Angelo Petraglia) – 3:42
4. "I Need You" (Jess Brown, Wendell Mobley) – 3:42
5. "Little Hercules" (Craig Carothers) – 4:49
6. "Under the Rainbow" (Matraca Berg, Randy Scruggs) – 4:15
7. "Everybody Knows" (Berg, Gary Harrison) – 3:14
8. "Hello, I'm Gone" (Kevin Welch) – 3:42
9. "Maybe It's Love" (Beth Nielsen Chapman, Annie Roboff) – 5:01
10. "A Lover Is Forever" (Steve Goodman, J. Fred Knobloch) – 3:44

=== International edition ===
1. "I Want to Live Again" (Tom Shapiro, George Teren) – 3:05
2. "It's Alright" (Gary Nicholson, Jamie O'Hara) – 3:13
3. "Even A Cowboy Can Dream" (Craig Bickhardt, Barry Alfonso) – 4:06
4. "Believe Me Baby (I Lied)" (Larry Gottlieb, Kim Richey, Angelo Petraglia) – 3:42
5. "I Need You" (Jess Brown, Wendell Mobley) – 3:42
6. "Little Hercules" (Craig Carothers) – 4:49
7. "Under the Rainbow" (Matraca Berg, Randy Scruggs) – 4:15
8. "Everybody Knows" (Berg, Gary Harrison) – 3:14
9. "Hello, I'm Gone" (Kevin Welch) – 3:42
10. "Find a River" (Fred Tackett) – 3:31
11. "The Chance I Take" (Tom Littfield, Rick Rowell) – 3:31
12. "Maybe It's Love" (Beth Nielsen Chapman, Annie Roboff) – 5:01
13. "A Lover Is Forever" (Steve Goodman, J. Fred Knobloch) – 3:44

== Personnel ==
- Trisha Yearwood – lead vocals, harmony vocals (1, 3, 5)
- Matt Rollings – organ (1, 3), acoustic piano (2, 4–9)
- Steve Nathan – organ (2, 6), keyboards (4, 8, 9)
- Fats Kaplin – accordion (8)
- Billy Joe Walker, Jr. – acoustic guitar (1–9)
- Biff Watson – acoustic guitar (1, 3)
- Bobby All – acoustic guitar (2, 7)
- Steuart Smith – acoustic guitar (5)
- J. Fred Knobloch – acoustic guitar (10)
- Brent Mason – electric guitars (1–4, 6–9), gut string guitar (9)
- Dan Dugmore – steel guitar (1, 4), 12-string guitar (3)
- Paul Franklin – steel guitar (2, 5–9), Hawaiian guitar (6)
- Leland Sklar – bass (1, 3, 4)
- Dave Pomeroy – bass (2, 5–9)
- Eddie Bayers – drums (1–8)
- Owen Hale – drums (9)
- Tom Roady – tambourine (1, 3)
- Sam Bacco – claves (2), marimba (2), shakers (2), cymbals (5), dumbek (5), congas (7)
- Rob Hajacos – fiddle (1, 2, 6, 8)
- Aubrey Haynie – fiddle (7)
- Kirk "Jelly Roll" Johnson – harmonica (10)
- Garth Fundis – harmony vocals (1, 8)
- Cindy Richardson – harmony vocals (1)
- Dennis Wilson – harmony vocals (1)
- Raul Malo – harmony vocals (2)
- Kim Richey – harmony vocals (3)
- Andrea Zonn – harmony vocals (4, 7)
- Matraca Berg – harmony vocals (6, 7)
- Harry Stinson – harmony vocals (6, 7)
- Mac McAnally – harmony vocals (7)
- Becky Priest – harmony vocals (8)
- Vince Gill – harmony vocals (9)

The Nashville String Machine (Tracks 4, 5 & 9)

- Charles Cochran – string arrangements (4)
- Kristin Wilkinson – string arrangements (5, 9)
- John Catchings – cello
- Richard Grosjean, Gary Vanosdale and Kristin Wilkinson – viola
- David Angell, David Davidson, Connie Ellisor, Carl Gorodetzky, Lee Larrison, Pamela Sixfin, Alan Umstead and Mary Kathryn Vanosdale – violin

String Trio (Track 10)

- John Catchings – cello
- Kristin Wilkinson – viola, arrangements
- David Davidson – violin

== Production ==
- Garth Fundis – producer
- Chuck Ainlay – recording, mixing
- Dave Sinko – recording
- Ken Hutton – additional recording, recording assistant
- Carl Meadows – recording assistant
- Mark Ralston – recording assistant, mix assistant
- Alan Schulman – recording assistant
- Graham Lewis – mix assistant
- Don Cobb – digital editing
- Carlos Grier – digital editing
- Denny Purcell – mastering
- Georgetown Masters (Nashville, Tennessee) – mastering location
- Scott Paschall – production assistant
- Beth Middleworth – art direction, design
- Trisha Yearwood – art direction
- Russ Harrington – photography
- Norma Jean Roy – booklet photography
- Mary Beth Felts – make-up
- Sheri McCoy – stylist
- Maria Smoot – hair stylist
- Karen & Co. – management

== Charts ==
=== Weekly charts ===
Chart (1996)	Peak position
Australian Albums (ARIA)	128
Canadian Albums (RPM)	50
Canadian Country Albums (RPM)	22
US Billboard 200	52
US Top Country Albums (Billboard)	6
UK Country Albums (Official Charts)	2

=== Year-end charts ===
Chart (1996)	Position
US Top Country Albums (Billboard)	63

=== Singles ===
Year	Single	Chart Positions	
Year	Single	US Country	CAN Country
1996	"Believe Me Baby (Lied)"	1	1
1997	"Everybody Knows"	3	1
1997	"I Need You"	36	41

== Certifications ==
Region	Certification	Certified units/sales
United States (RIAA)	Gold	500,000^{^}
^{^} Shipments figures based on certification alone.
