= The Mirror (Trisha Yearwood album) =

Studio album by Trisha Yearwood
- Released: July 18, 2025
- Studio: Allentown Studios
- Genre: Country
- Length: 49:51
- Label: Gwendolyn; MCA Nashville; Virgin
- Producer: Chad Carlson; Trisha Yearwood

Trisha Yearwood chronology
Every Girl (2019)	The Mirror (2025)	Christmastime (2025)

Singles from The Mirror
- 1. "The Mirror" Released: June 29, 2025

The Mirror is the sixteenth studio album by American country music artist Trisha Yearwood. It was released on July 18, 2025, via Gwendolyn Records, MCA Nashville and Virgin Music Group. Yearwood co-wrote every track on the album and co-produced it with Chad Carlson. An extended deluxe edition was released on January 23, 2026.

== Background ==
Trisha Yearwood was among the most commercially successful country artists of the 1990s, having five number one and several top ten US country chart singles. In the 2000s she also became known for her work as a celebrity chef, author and businesswoman. All the while, she maintained a country music career with US top 40 singles as recent as 2019's "Every Girl in This Town". Not previously categorized as a singer-songwriter, Yearwood began experimenting with co-writing several years before making The Mirror. In an interview with Country Living magazine, Yearwood said that at college, another songwriter told her she did not have any writing talent. She decided to take up songwriting again after realizing that the songwriter's advice "did not have to be the truth". Fellow country songwriters encouraged Yearwood's song composing, notably Leslie Satcher. With Satcher and others, Yearwood's decided to craft an entire album of self-penned material.

== Recording and content ==
The Mirror was recorded at Allentown Studios, located in Nashville, Tennessee. It was co-produced by Yearwood herself and Chad Carlson. The project is the first in Yearwood's career that she co-produced. Primarily under the production of Garth Fundis with most of her albums, Yearwood "wanted to flex my [her] own wings" since she learned a lot from him. She chose co-producer, Chad Carlson because he had engineered many of her previous Fundis-produced projects, which made it feel "like it was venturing out with a safety net".

The project's concept was described by Yearwood as being "letters to my younger self" along with showing the amount of reflection and growing she has done since her early years (hence the album's title). The album consisted of 15 tracks in total, all of which were co-written by Yearwood. The opening track, "Bringing the Angels", describes themes of spirituality and perseverance. Another track, "Girls Night In", describes a social gathering between female friends and the stories they share over the course of an evening. According to Yearwood the tracks "Fearless These Days", "Goodnight Cruel World" and the title track especially highlight the theme of looking back at her younger years. The closing track, "When October Settles In", was written about the death of her mother. The album features collaborations with Lady A's Charles Kelley ("The Record Plays On"), Hailey Whitters ("Drunk Works"), and Jim Lauderdale ("The Shovel").

== Release, promotion and critical reception ==
Professional ratings
Review scores
Source	Rating
AllMusic	4/5 stars

The Mirror was released on July 18, 2025, in a joint partnership between Yearwood's own label (Gwendolyn Records), along with MCA Records and the Virgin Music Group. It was offered as a LP, compact disc or digitally. Its the sixteenth studio album of her music career. In an interview with Grammy.com, she explained that when she had the opportunity to take the music to a major record label she discovered that Virgin was interested in it, leading to the label releasing it in joint venture with MCA. In preparation for the album's release, two songs were released on May 2, 2025, ahead of the album: "Bringing the Angels" and "The Wall or the Way Over". On June 29, 2025, the album's title track was issued as its official lead single. Thom Jurek of AllMusic gave the album four out of five stars in his review, writing, "Its production, though predictably polished, isn't overly laden with effects or gimmicks. Its musical maturity seamlessly juxtaposes radio-friendly contemporary country with the singer/songwriter's soulful neo-traditionalist roots. It's a masterpiece." The Mirror made its debut on several US Billboard album charts for the week of August 2, 2025. It peaked at number 38 on the Top Country Albums chart, number 12 on the Top Album Sales chart and number 31 on the Independent Albums chart.

A deluxe edition, which added five additional songs to the tracklisting, was issued on January 23, 2026.

== Track listing ==
The Mirror (LP, CD and digital formats)
No.	Title	Writer(s)	Length
1.	"Bringing the Angels"	Trisha Yearwood; Beth Bernard; Leslie Satcher; Bridgette Tatum	2:46
2.	"The Wall or the Way Over"	Yearwood; Emma-Lee; Maia Sharp	3:42
3.	"Little Lady"	Yearwood; Satcher; Tatum	3:25
4.	"The Mirror"	Yearwood; Satcher; Tatum	3:15
5.	"Fearless These Days"	Yearwood; Makayla Lynn; Satcher	3:29
6.	"So Many Summers"	Yearwood; Jim "Moose" Brown; Erin Enderlin	3:29
7.	"The Record Plays On" (featuring Charles Kelley)	Yearwood; Chad Carlson; Melissa Fuller	3:28
8.	"Girls Night In"	Yearwood; Rebecca Lynn Howard; Rachel Thibodeau	3:33
9.	"Drunk Works" (featuring Hailey Whitters)	Yearwood; Hailey Whitters; Carlson	3:01
10.	"Fragile Like a Bomb"	Yearwood; Carlson; Fuller	3:39
11.	"The Ocean and the River"	Yearwood; Lynn; Satcher	3:40
12.	"The Shovel" (featuring Jim Lauderdale)	Yearwood; Matt Rossi; Bobby Terry	2:56
13.	"When I'm with You"	Yearwood; Brett Boyett; Satcher	2:47
14.	"Goodnight Cruel World"	Yearwood; Enderlin; Sunny Sweeney	2:42
15.	"When October Settles In"	Yearwood; Steven Dorff; Satcher	4:01
Total length:			49:53

The Mirror (Deluxe Edition)
No.	Title	Writer(s)	Length
16.	"Different Kinda Hard"	Yearwood; Brad Warren	3:21
17.	"You're Gonna Love It Here"	Yearwood; Carlson; Fuller	3:24
18.	"Undone"	Yearwood; Satcher	3:52
19.	"Country Music Herstory"	Yearwood; Lynn; Satcher	3:30
20.	"Put It in a Song"	Yearwood; Brown; Enderlin	3:32
Total length:			1:06:00

== Personnel ==
Credits adapted from Tidal.

- Trisha Yearwood – vocals, production (all tracks); background vocals (tracks 1, 6, 8, 10, 11, 14)
- Chad Carlson – production, mixing, engineering (all tracks); background vocals (2, 4, 6, 9, 10, 13, 14)
- Adam Ayan – mastering
- Grant Wilson – mixing assistance
- Sam Hunter – acoustic guitar
- Steve Mackey – bass
- Rob McNelley – electric guitar
- Billy Justineau – keyboards
- Greg Morrow – drums (1, 2, 4–15)
- Robert Bailey – background vocals (1)
- Vicki Hampton – background vocals (1)
- Emma-Lee – background vocals (2)
- Leslie Satcher – background vocals (3, 13)
- Bridgette Tatum – background vocals (3)
- Jerry Roe – drums (3)
- Makayla Lynn – background vocals (5, 11)
- Dan Dugmore – pedal steel guitar (7, 11, 14)
- Charles Kelley – vocals (7)
- Beth Bernard – background vocals (8)
- Rachel Thibodeau – background vocals (8)
- Rebecca Lynn Howard – background vocals (8)
- Hailey Whitters – vocals (9)
- Melissa Fuller – background vocals (10)
- Jenee Fleenor – fiddle (12)
- Jim Lauderdale – vocals (12)
- Austin Hoke – cello (15)
- Kristin Wilkinson – viola (15)
- Alicia Enstrom – violin (15)
- David Davidson – violin (15)

== Charts ==
Chart performance for The Mirror
Chart (2025)	Peak position
Scottish Albums (OCC)	49
UK Albums Sales (OCC)	75
UK Country Albums (OCC)	4
UK Independent Albums (OCC)	26
US Billboard 200	190
US Independent Albums (Billboard)	31
US Top Country Albums (Billboard)	38

== Release history ==
Release history and formats for The Mirror
Region	Date	Format	Label	Ref.
Various	July 18, 2025	CD; LP; digital download; streaming	Gwendolyn; MCA Nashville; Virgin	
