= The Song Remembers When =

Studio album by Trisha Yearwood
- Released: October 26, 1993
- Studio: Sound Emporium (Nashville, Tennessee)
- Genre: Country
- Length: 36:54
- Label: MCA Nashville
- Producer: Garth Fundis

Trisha Yearwood chronology
Hearts in Armor (1992)	The Song Remembers When (1993)	The Song Remembers When: A Live Concert Performance (1993)

Singles from The Song Remembers When
- 1. "The Song Remembers When" Released: October 12, 1993; 2. "Better Your Heart Than Mine" Released: February 5, 1994

The Song Remembers When is the third studio album by American country music artist Trisha Yearwood. The album was released October 26, 1993, by MCA Nashville Records and was produced by Garth Fundis. It was Yearwood's third collaboration with Fundis, who also produced her 1992 album, Hearts in Armor which received wide critical acclaim, as well as her platinum-selling eponymous debut. The title track was the album's lead single, becoming a major hit, peaking at #2 on the Hot Country Singles & Tracks chart in 1993.

== Background ==
The Song Remembers When was recorded at Sound Emporium Studios in Nashville, Tennessee, in 1993 and contained ten tracks. Thom Jurek of Allmusic called the content "contemporary country" and "top notch no matter where the pair get it from." John McAlley of Rolling Stone called The Song Remembers When's tone "somber." McAlley goes on to explain that, "Love (Sort of) Stinks" might have been a more apt title for this album, such are the voices of heartache, spite and uncertainty that permeate it. So total, in fact, is its focus on the tribulations of romantic love that Song resembles a concept record." The album opens with the title track, which was described by Jurek as "innocent love gone bad." The second song, "Better Your Heart Than Mine," which was written by Lisa Angelle and Andrew Gold was said to evoke the Rock-inspired style of Bonnie Raitt, according to Jurek. The third track, "I Don't Fall In Love So Easy" features background vocals from Rodney Crowell, who also wrote the song.

Most of the songs included on the album are further recorded in a country pop style, including "The Nightingale" and "Lying to the Moon." The album includes two cover versions. The first is a cover of Linda Ronstadt's "Mr. Radio," one of Yearwood's major influences. McAlley called "Mr. Radio" a "reverent cover" of Ronstadt's song. The second cover is Willie Nelson's 1966 single, "One In a Row," in which Nelson performs a guitar solo." Matraca Berg's "Lying to the Moon" (originally recorded by Berg on her 1990 album of the same name) was considered by McAlley to be, "the hit-bound title track so undeniably sad that songs intended to offer reconciliation and uplift." He further stated that "The Nightingale" and "I Don't Fall In Love So Easy" to also possess what "Lying to the Moon" has, stating they, "buckle under their own ambivalence and the album's cumulative weight."

== Critical reception ==
Professional ratings
Review scores
Source	Rating
Allmusic	4/5 stars
Entertainment Weekly	C+
Los Angeles Times	2.5/4 stars
Rolling Stone	3/5 stars

John McAlley of Rolling Stone gave The Song Remembers When three out of five stars, giving his reasons for this by stating, "To say a record is downbeat is not to say it is bad. Without exception, the neocountry music on Song is accessible, state-of-the-art and brilliantly played and arranged. But for the 29-year-old singer, The Song Remembers When is not the rich showcase she had on her two previous albums. For all its grit, there is a middle-of-the-road quality about Song that is disconcerting. And its lesser material feels secondhand. There is little of the spontaneity and few of the interpretive leaps that have made Yearwood's vocal gift so arresting." Allmusic's Thom Jurek gave it a higher review, giving it four out of five stars. Jurek praised the album more highly, stating, "It's poetry, this combination of singer and song. She couldn't sing it any better if she'd written it; the accents create tension and drama and images from every betrayed-lover's movie from the '40s on, washing through the mix. Only a real singer can deliver the image from the heart of the song. Yearwood here is the heart of the song itself."

CD Universe also reviewed The Song Remembers When, where it received five out of five stars. The website considered that many of the tracks combined with Yearwood's vocals, "shows the artistry of what an accomplished interpreter can create with a strong melody." CD Universe called the tracks, "The Song Remembers When" and "The Nightingale" the album's highlights.

== Release and aftermath ==
The lead single off The Song Remembers When was the title track. Released in 1993, the song became a major hit, peaking at #2 on Billboard's Hot Country Singles & Tracks chart, while also becoming her first single to chart within the Billboard Hot 100, peaking at #82. The album's second and final single, "Better Your Heart Than Mine" was released in 1994, becoming her first single to miss the Top 20, reaching #21. The Song Remembers When reached a peak of #6 on the Billboard Top Country Albums chart, while also peaking at #40 on the Billboard 200 albums chart as well. In December 1993, the album was certified gold, and in December 1994, it was certified by platinum in sales by the Recording Industry Association of America. It was nominated for Best Country Album at the 37th Grammy Awards.

== Track listing ==
No.	Title	Writer(s)	Length
1.	"The Song Remembers When"	Hugh Prestwood	3:54
2.	"Better Your Heart Than Mine"	Lisa Angelle; Andrew Gold	3:52
3.	"I Don't Fall in Love So Easy" (featuring Rodney Crowell)	Crowell	4:12
4.	"Hard Promises to Keep"	Kimmie Rhodes	3:57
5.	"Mr. Radio"	Roderick Taylor	3:25
6.	"The Nightingale"	Jude Johnstone	3:50
7.	"If I Ain't Got You"	Trey Bruce; Craig Wiseman	3:01
8.	"One in a Row" (featuring Willie Nelson)	Nelson	3:11
9.	"Here Comes Temptation"	Kostas	3:40
10.	"Lying to the Moon"	Matraca Berg; Ronnie Samoset	3:52

International version
No.	Title	Length
1.	"Walkaway Joe"
2.	"The Song Remembers When"
3.	"Better Your Heart Than Mine"
4.	"I Don't Fall In Love So Easy"
5.	"Hard Promises to Keep"
6.	"Mr. Radio"
7.	"The Nightingale"
8.	"If I Ain't Got You"
9.	"One In a Row"
10.	"Here Comes Temptation"
11.	"Lying to the Moon"
12.	"New Kid In Town"

== Personnel ==
Vocals

- Trisha Yearwood – lead vocals, backing vocals (1, 7, 9)
- Lisa Angelle – backing vocals (2)
- Andrew Gold – backing vocals (2)
- Rodney Crowell – featured vocals (3)
- Thom Flora – backing vocals (8)
- Garth Fundis – backing vocals (3)
- Raul Malo – backing vocals (5, 9)
- Willie Nelson – featured vocals (4)
- Lisa Silver – backing vocals (5, 8)

Musicians

- Eddie Bayers – drums (2, 4, 5, 7, 9)
- Jerry Douglas – dobro (6)
- Paul Franklin – steel guitar (1, 3, 4, 5, 7–10), slide guitar (2), dobro (4), pedabro (10)
- Rob Hajacos – fiddle (2, 5, 7, 8)
- George Marinelli – electric guitar (4, 9)
- Carl Marsh – string arrangements
- Brent Mason – electric guitar (1, 7, 8, 10)
- Steve Nathan – acoustic piano (1, 3), organ (3), keyboards (6)
- Willie Nelson – acoustic guitar solo (8)
- Dave Pomeroy – bass (1–5, 7–10)
- Matt Rollings – keyboards (2), acoustic piano (4–10)
- Milton Sledge – drums (1, 3, 8, 10)
- Steuart Smith – electric guitar (2, 3, 5, 7, 9)
- Billy Joe Walker, Jr. – acoustic guitar (1, 2, 3, 5, 7–10)

Production

- Mary Beth Felts – make-up
- Garth Fundis – producer, mixing
- George Holz – cover photography
- Georgetown Masters (Nashville, Tennessee) – mastering location
- Ken Hutton – assistant engineer, mix assistant
- Buddy Jackson – art direction, design
- Jim Kemp – art direction
- Gary Laney – engineer, mix assistant
- Sheri McCoy – stylist
- Beth Middleworth – design
- Scott Paschall – production assistant
- Denny Purcell – mastering
- Susan Schelling – photography
- Dave Sinko – engineer, mix assistant
- Maria Smoot – hair stylist

== Charts ==
=== Weekly charts ===
Chart (1993–1994)	Peak position
Australian Albums (ARIA)	114
Canadian Country Albums (RPM)	18
US Billboard 200	40
US Top Country Albums (Billboard)	6
UK Country Albums (OCC)	4

=== Certifications ===
Region	Certification	Certified units/sales
Canada (Music Canada)	Gold	50,000^{^}
United States (RIAA)	Platinum	1,000,000^{^}
^{^} Shipments figures based on certification alone.

=== Year-end charts ===
Chart (1994)	Position
US Top Country Albums (Billboard)	28

=== Singles ===
Year	Song	Chart positions		
Year	Song	US Country	US	CAN Country
1993	"The Song Remembers When"	2	82	4
1994	"Better Your Heart Than Mine"	21	—	21
"—" denotes releases that did not chart.
