= Sunday Morning to Saturday Night =

Studio album by Matraca Berg
- Released: September 23, 1997
- Studio: The Tracking Room, Emerald Sound Studios and Masterfonics (Nashville, Tennessee)
- Genre: Country
- Length: 39:59
- Label: Rising Tide
- Producer: Emory Gordy Jr.; Track 5 co-produced by Randy Scruggs

Matraca Berg chronology
The Speed of Grace (1994)	Sunday Morning to Saturday Night (1997)	The Masters (1998)

Sunday Morning to Saturday Night is the third studio album by American country music singer-songwriter Matraca Berg. It was released in 1997 via Rising Tide Records. The album contains the singles "That Train Don't Run", "Back When We Were Beautiful", and "Back in the Saddle".

== Content ==
The album's first single was "That Train Don't Run", which charted at number 59 on Billboard Hot Country Songs in 1997. Pinmonkey later covered this song on their 2006 album Big Shiny Cars, and also issued their version as a single that year. "Back When We Were Beautiful" was issued as a single in late 1997, but it did not chart. Rodney Crowell and Emmylou Harris covered this song on their 2013 collaborative album Old Yellow Moon. "Back in the Saddle" charted at number 51 in 1998, becoming Berg's last chart entry.

== Critical reception ==
Rating it four-and-a-half out of five stars, Thom Owens of AllMusic stated, "Nearly every song on the record either sparkles with wit or is impeccably observed and affecting. Similarly, the music is fresh and alive, ranging from hard-rocking honky tonk to country-folk to country-rock to moving ballads."

== Track listing ==
All songs written by Matraca Berg; co-writers in parentheses.

1. "Along for the Ride" (Sharon Rice) - 3:45
2. "That Train Don't Run" (Gary Harrison) - 3:15
3. "Back in the Saddle" (Stan Lynch) - 3:16
4. "Here You Come Raining on Me" (Rice, Jeff Hanna) - 3:02
5. "Some People Fall, Some People Fly" (Randy Scruggs) - 3:13
6. "Back When We Were Beautiful" - 3:40
7. "Sunday Morning to Saturday Night" (Harrison) - 3:39
8. "Good Ol' Girl" (Scruggs) - 3:54
9. "Give Me Tonight" (Scruggs) - 3:23
10. "If I Were an Angel" (Harrison, Kim Carnes) - 4:06
11. "The Resurrection" (Alice Randall) - 4:34

== Personnel ==
Musicians

- Matraca Berg – vocals, acoustic guitar (1, 2, 4, 5, 7, 8, 11)
- Tim Lauer – accordion (1, 8), Hammond B3 organ (5), Wurlitzer electric piano (5)
- Reese Wynans – acoustic piano (1–3, 6–11), Hammond B3 organ (2, 7, 11), synthesizers (11)
- Richard Bennett – electric guitars (1, 2, 7–11), acoustic guitar (3), bouzouki (4)
- Dan Dugmore – electric guitars (1, 4, 5), steel guitar (1–3, 7, 8, 10, 11), 12-string guitar (9)
- Biff Watson – acoustic guitar (1–4, 7–11)
- Steve Gibson – 5-string dobro (1), electric guitars (2, 3, 11), mandolin (7, 8), acoustic slide guitar (10)
- Jeff Hanna – National guitar (4), slide guitar (7), electric guitars (11)
- Randy Scruggs – acoustic guitar (5, 9), mandolin (5)
- Raul Malo – electric guitars (9)
- Tammy Rogers – mandolin (1, 11), fiddle (2, 3, 8), viola (6, 10)
- Emory Gordy Jr. – bass (1–4, 7–11), additional keyboards (11) (credited as "Fantom of the Opry")
- Gary Lunn – bass (5)
- Craig Nelson – upright bass (6, 10)
- Eddie Bayers drums (1–4, 7–11)
- Chad Cromwell – drums (5)
- Harry Stinson – percussion (10)
- Stuart Duncan – fiddle (5)
- Kris Wilkinson – viola (6, 10)

Background vocals

- Sharon Rice – backing vocals (1)
- Kim Carnes – backing vocals (2)
- Jeff Hanna – backing vocals (2, 11)
- Matraca Berg – backing vocals (3, 5, 9, 11)
- Suzy Bogguss – backing vocals (3, 9)
- Faith Hill – backing vocals (3)
- Patty Loveless – backing vocals (3)
- Martina McBride – backing vocals (3)
- Evelyn Cox – backing vocals (4)
- Suzanne Cox – backing vocals (4)
- The Callaways (Coleida Callaway, Sudie Callaway, Clara Howard, and Lois Johnson) – backing vocals (7, 11)
- Harry Stinson – backing vocals (8)
- Raul Malo – backing vocals (9)

== Production ==
- Emory Gordy Jr. – producer
- Randy Scruggs – producer (5)
- Steve Marcantonio – track recording, mixing
- Russ Martin – track recording, overdub recording
- Chris Davie – mix assistant
- Glenn Meadows – mastering
- Lauren Koch – production coordinator
- Frank Olinsky – art direction, design
- Matthew Barnes – photography
- Mike Crowley – management

== Chart performance ==
Chart (1997)	Peak position
U.S. Billboard Top Country Albums	48
