= Powerful Thing =

Single by Trisha Yearwood

from the album Where Your Road Leads
- B-side: "Never Let You Go Again"
- Released: November 16, 1998
- Genre: Country
- Length: 2:56
- Label: MCA Nashville
- Songwriters: Al Anderson; Sharon Vaughn
- Producers: Tony Brown; Trisha Yearwood

Trisha Yearwood singles chronology
"Where Your Road Leads" (1998)	"Powerful Thing" (1998)	"I'll Still Love You More" (1999)

"Powerful Thing" is a song written by Al Anderson and Sharon Vaughn, and recorded by American country music artist Trisha Yearwood. It was released in November 1998 as the third single from her album Where Your Road Leads. The song reached number 6 on the Billboard Hot Country Singles & Tracks chart in March 1999 and number 1 on the RPM Country Tracks chart in Canada.

== Critical reception ==
Deborah Evans Price, of Billboard magazine reviewed the song favorably, calling it "perky and playful." She goes on to say that while the lyric is "slightly clichéd", the song makes up for it because of her "incredible voice and tons of personality."

== Chart performance ==
"Powerful" debuted at number seventy on the U.S. Billboard Hot Country Singles & Tracks for the week of November 28, 1998.

Chart (1998–1999)	Peak position
Canada Country Singles (RPM)	1
US Billboard Hot 100	50
US Hot Country Songs (Billboard)	6

=== Year-end charts ===
Chart (1999)	Position
Canada Country Tracks (RPM)	13
US Country Songs (Billboard)	39
