= I'll Still Love You More =

1999 single by Trisha Yearwood

Single by Trisha Yearwood

from the album Where Your Road Leads
- B-side: "Wouldn't Any Woman"
- Released: April 26, 1999
- Recorded: 1999
- Genre: Country
- Length: 4:21
- Label: MCA Nashville
- Songwriter: Diane Warren
- Producers: Tony Brown, Trisha Yearwood

Trisha Yearwood singles chronology
"Powerful Thing" (1998)	"I'll Still Love You More" (1999)	"You're Where I Belong" (1999)

Music videos
- "I'll Still Love You More" on YouTube

"I'll Still Love You More" is a song recorded by American country music artist Trisha Yearwood for her seventh studio album Where Your Road Leads (1998). It was written by Diane Warren, produced by Yearwood and Tony Brown, and released in April 1999 as the album's fourth single. Aside from the album version, a pop remix also exists with slightly different vocals. The song reached number 10 on the US Billboard Hot Country Singles & Tracks chart, and number 65 on the US Billboard Hot 100.

== Critical reception ==
Deborah Evans Price, of Billboard magazine reviewed the song favorably, saying that while it doesn't have the "dramatic feeling or sweeping cinematic power of 'How Do I Live'", it still an effective ballad. Price described Yearwood's performance as "beautiful and flawless."

== Music video ==
The video was directed by Picture Vision.

== Chart performance ==
"I'll Still Love You More" debuted at number 69 on the U.S. Billboard Hot Country Singles & Tracks for the week of May 8, 1999.

== Charts ==
=== Weekly charts ===
Chart (1999)	Peak position
Australia (ARIA)	183
Canada Country Singles (RPM)	6
US Billboard Hot 100	65
US Hot Country Songs (Billboard)	10

=== Year-end charts ===
Chart (1999)	Position
Canada Country Tracks (RPM)	74
US Country Songs (Billboard)	37
