= Every Girl (album) =

Studio album by Trisha Yearwood
- Released: August 30, 2019
- Recorded: 2018–2019
- Genre: Country; contemporary country
- Length: 49:38
- Label: Gwendolyn
- Producer: Garth Fundis

Trisha Yearwood chronology
Let's Be Frank (2018)	Every Girl (2019)	The Mirror (2025)

Singles from Every Girl
- 1. "Every Girl in This Town" Released: June 6, 2019; 2. "I'll Carry You Home" Released: September 22, 2020

Every Girl: Deluxe (2021 reissue)

Every Girl is the fifteenth studio album by American country music artist Trisha Yearwood. It was released on August 30, 2019, by Gwendolyn Records. The lead single, "Every Girl in This Town", was launched two months prior to the album's release date and became a minor hit single on the Billboard country charts that summer. This is Yearwood's first album with all new original material since 2007's Heaven, Heartache and the Power of Love.

Every Girl was named for its lead single and was Yearwood's fifteenth studio recording. It was also her fourth album issued through an independent label. The project's fourteen songs received positive reception from music journalists and critics following its release. A reissued version of the album was released in mid 2021 titled Every Girl: Deluxe. The new version includes several new tracks, along with the previously released tracks, it includes a 30th Anniversary Acoustic version of her first single "She's in Love with the Boy" which was made available on iTunes with the deluxe itunes pre-order.

== Background ==
Every Girl was produced by Garth Fundis, Yearwood's production collaborator since the early 1990s. This is her first country album since 2007's Heaven, Heartache and the Power of Love (not including 2014's PrizeFighter: Hit After Hit) and her second since the release of a jazz project in early 2019. Yearwood said she went into the studio with "no pressure or expectations" which made the project easier to approach. "I'm so grateful the songs were there. I found 14 tunes I couldn't live without. You want people to recognize you as an artist, but you also want to take them somewhere they haven't necessarily been with you before," she explained.

== Content ==
The album contained fourteen new songs composed mostly by female songwriters including Karla Bonoff, Lucie Silvas, and Ashley McBryde. It featured several collaborations with artists Yearwood had mostly worked with before: Garth Brooks, Kelly Clarkson, Don Henley and Patty Loveless. Yearwood described working with some of them in a 2019 interview. She called Clarkson's voice "the unicorn, who's always on pitch". The pair record the album's fifth track, "Tell Me Something I Don't Know". "When you want that strong, soaring harmony, nobody does it like her. She's just a little sister — fun and with all this energy," Yearwood commented. Having known Patty Loveless for many years, she called her a "quiet" and "solid friend". Yearwood's husband Garth Brooks is featured on the track "What Gave Me Away". The pair first recorded together in the 1990s.

Other tracks on the album were first recorded by other artists. The song, "Find a Way", features backing vocals by Lucie Silvas, which she first recorded for her 2015 album Letters to Ghosts. "Home" was first recorded by its writer, Karla Bonoff, in 1977 for her eponymous studio album. "Bible and a .44" was first recorded by its writer as well, Ashley McBryde. She first recorded it for her 2016 extended play, Jalopies and Expensive Guitars.

For Every Girl: Deluxe, Yearwood chose the same songs from the original project, with the exception of three new recordings. The first new track included was her cover of the Lady Gaga and Bradley Cooper duet, "Shallow". Also included is an original composition titled "I Dare You to Love" and an acoustic version of Yearwood's number one single "She's in Love with the Boy". Yearwood explained her appreciation for the 1991 song in a 2021 interview: "It's precious to me now because it represents the beginning, and it represents the longevity of a good song and the loyalty of a fan base." "I Dare You to Love" was composed by Natalie Hemby, Laura Veltz and Best West.

== Critical reception ==
Professional ratings
Review scores
Source	Rating
Allmusic	4/5 stars
Digital Journal	A
Roughstock	Favorable
Sounds Like Nashville	Favorable

Every Girl was reviewed positively by music critics and writers alike. Matt Bjorke of Roughstock called her vocals "pristine" and "more powerful" than ever before. He compared "Workin' on Whiskey" to a songs since recorded by that of Tammy Wynette. Bjorke also praised "Home", calling it "a master class of nuanced emotion." Bjorke concluded by saying, "When listening to Every Girl, you wouldn’t know it’s been a dozen years between all-new albums for Miss Trisha Yearwood (how Garth Brooks once introduced her to me), but that’s exactly the case and it makes me hope that her creative spirit of albums." Markos Papadatos of the Digital Journal gave the album an "A" rating in his review. He praised several tracks on the project, including the title track which he called "empowering". "Overall, Trisha Yearwood is back stronger than ever with Every Girl, and she is country to the core. Fans and listeners ought to do themselves a favor and purchase this as a whole album," he commented.

Every Girl was also reviewed favorably by Cillea Houghton of Sounds Like Nashville. "Yearwood proves that she still stands as one of country music’s best vocalists and storytellers, drenching the project in a cinematic theme created by piano, strings and drops of steel guitar, all bound together by her timeless voice," she commented. Lastly, Thom Jurek of Allmusic gave the effort four out of five stars. Like other writers, Jurek praised her vocal effects and the quality of the songwriting. "Supported by excellent charts and nonintrusive production, she inhabits these songs as if she wrote them, making this not only a welcome return but one of her finest albums," he concluded.

== Release and commercial performance ==
In promotion of Every Girl, Yearwood will embark on her first solo tour in five years. The tour will begin in October 2019, starting with three concerts backed by the Nashville Symphony. Yearwood will reach 22 major cities on her tour. The title track was released as a single in June 2019 to also promote the record. The song debuted at number 21 on the Billboard Country Airplay chart, making it Yearwood's highest chart debut of her career. The song would also reach number 49 on the Billboard Hot Country Songs chart in July 2019, becoming a minor hit. At first, Yearwood was hesitant about releasing a single to country radio. However, the title track changed her mind. "That's so crazy to me — the icing on the cake. When you make sure you take care of the music, everything else will take care of itself," she commented.

Every Girl debuted at number five on the Billboard Top Country Albums chart, with 11,000 equivalent album units, of which 10,000 are in traditional album sales. The album also spent one week on the Billboard 200, where it reached number 57. It has sold 34,600 copies in the United States as of March 2020.

Every Girl: Deluxe was released on August 13, 2021, on the Gwendolyn label.

== Track listing ==
=== Original version ===
Every Girl (2019)
No.	Title	Writer(s)	Length
1.	"Workin' on Whiskey"	Dave Thomson; Jessica Mitchell; Patricia Conroy	3:49
2.	"Find a Way"	Lucie Silvas; Julian Emery	3:19
3.	"Home"	Karla Bonoff	3:43
4.	"Every Girl in This Town"	Erik Dylan; Connie Harrington; Caitlyn Smith	2:59
5.	"Tell Me Something I Don't Know" (featuring Kelly Clarkson)	Gordie Sampson; Silvas; Troy Verges	3:48
6.	"What Gave Me Away" (featuring Garth Brooks)	Blair Daly; Silvas; Verges	3:29
7.	"Something Kinda Like It"	Adam Wright; Shannon Wright	3:00
8.	"When Lonely Calls"	Jeffrey Steele	3:33
9.	"The Matador"	Gretchen Peters	4:12
10.	"I'll Carry You Home"	Sampson; Smith; Verges	3:36
11.	"Drink Up"	Hillary Lindsey; Sampson; Verges	2:50
12.	"Bible and a .44" (featuring Patty Loveless)	Terri Jo Box; Ashley McBryde; Patrick Savage	4:01
13.	"Can't Take Back Goodbye"	busbee; Smith; Verges	3:09
14.	"Love You Anyway" (featuring Don Henley)	Mike Reid	4:08
Total length:			49:38

=== Reissued version ===
Every Girl: Deluxe (2021)
No.	Title	Writer(s)	Length
1.	"Every Girl in This Town"	Dylan; Harrington; Smith	2:59
2.	"I Dare You to Love"	Natalie Hemby; Laura Veltz; Ben West	3:19
3.	"Workin' on Whiskey"	Thomson; Mitchell; Conroy	3:49
4.	"Find a Way"	Silvas; Emery	3:19
5.	"Home"	Bonoff	3:43
6.	"Shallow" (with Garth Brooks)	Lady Gaga; Mark Ronson; Anthony Rossomando; Andrew Wyatt	3:41
7.	"The Matador"	Peters	4:12
8.	"Can't Take Back Goodbye"	busbee; Smith; Verges	3:09
9.	"Tell Me Something I Don't Know" (featuring Kelly Clarkson)	Sampson; Silvas; Verges	3:48
10.	"What Gave Me Away" (featuring Garth Brooks)	Daly; Silvas; Verges	3:29
11.	"Something Kinda Like It"	A. Wright; S. Wright	3:00
12.	"When Lonely Calls"	Steele	3:33
13.	"She's in Love with the Boy" (acoustic; 30th anniversary)	Jon Ims	4:06
14.	"Bible and a .44" (featuring Patty Loveless)	Box; McBryde; Savage	4:01
15.	"I'll Carry You Home"	Sampson; Smith; Verges	3:33
16.	"Drink Up"	Lindsey; Sampson; Verges	2:50
17.	"Love You Anyway" (featuring Don Henley)	Reid	4:08

== Personnel ==
All credits are adapted from Allmusic.

Musical personnel

- Jessi Alexander – background vocals
- David Angell – violin
- Monisa Angell – viola
- Robert Bailey – background vocals, vocal chorus
- Roland Barber – horn
- Jenny Bifano – violin
- Garth Brooks – featured vocals on "What Gave Me Away"
- Chad Carlson – background vocals
- Kelly Clarkson – featured vocals on "Tell Me Something I Don't Know"
- Dave Cohen – organ, piano, synthesizer
- David Davidson – violin
- Gabe Dixon – organ, piano, synthesizer
- Dan Dugmore – electric guitar, steel guitar
- Melissa Fuller – background vocals
- Vicki Hampton – background vocals, vocal chorus
- Don Henley – featured vocals on "Love You Anyway"
- Steve Herman – organ
- Jim Hoke – horn
- Scotty Huff – trumpet
- Hillary Lindsey – background vocals
- Patty Loveless – featured vocals on "Bible and a .44"
- Steve Mackey – bass guitar
- Rob McNelley – acoustic guitar, electric guitar
- Carl Miner – acoustic guitar, dobro, nylon string guitar, mandolin
- Greg Morrow – drums
- Tim O'Brien – background vocals
- Carole Rabinowitz – cello
- Jon Randall – background vocals
- Karyn Rochelle – background vocals, vocal chorus
- Lucie Silvas – background vocals
- Jarrad K – background vocals
- Wei Tsun Chang – violin
- Kristin Wilkinson – viola
- Karen Winkelmann – violin
- Trisha Yearwood – lead vocals, background vocals

Technical personnel

- Chad Carlson – engineering, percussion
- Tommy Colorigh – retouching
- Garth Fundis – producer
- Russ Harrington – photography
- Greg Morrow – percussion
- Kristin Wilkinson – string arrangements

== Charts ==
Chart (2019)	Peak position
US Billboard 200	57
US Top Album Sales (Billboard)	7
US Top Country Albums (Billboard)	5
US Independent Albums (Billboard)	3

== Release history ==
Region	Date	Format	Label	Ref.
United States	August 30, 2019	Compact disc; music download; streaming; vinyl	Gwendolyn Records	
United States	August 13, 2021	Music download; streaming	Gwendolyn Records	
