= There Goes My Baby (Trisha Yearwood song) =

Single by Trisha Yearwood

from the album Where Your Road Leads
- B-side: "One More Chance"
- Released: April 28, 1998
- Recorded: 1998
- Genre: Country
- Length: 3:49
- Label: MCA Nashville
- Songwriters: Annie Roboff; Arnie Roman
- Producers: Tony Brown, Trisha Yearwood

Trisha Yearwood singles chronology
"Perfect Love" (1998)	"There Goes My Baby" (1998)	"Where Your Road Leads" (1998)

Music video
- "There Goes My Baby" on YouTube

"There Goes My Baby" is a song written by Annie Roboff and Arnie Roman, and recorded by American country music singer Trisha Yearwood. It was released in April 1998, by MCA Nashville, as the lead single from her seventh studio album, Where Your Road Leads (1998). The song was the first single in which Yearwood acted as a co-producer, along with Tony Brown. The entire album the song came from was also produced by Yearwood and Brown together. Its accompanying music video was directed by Randee St. Nicholas.

== Content ==
The song is a ballad and tells the story of a woman who has just been dumped by her lover. She explains the lover loved her unselfishly and everyone knew how great of a man he was except herself. She realizes that she took the relationship for granted and refers to herself as a "fool" for doing so. In the chorus of the song, she explains how each night will be a lonely night and that his leaving is like the sun is falling out of the sky.

== Critical reception ==
Deborah Evans Price, of Billboard magazine reviewed the song favorably, saying that the song has a "soaring chorus" and that it "gives her a chance to show off her range, and she delivers the perfect amount of emotional punch during the verses."

== Music video ==
A music video for the song was released in 1998 as well, directed by Randee St. Nicholas. The video featured a controversial scene at the beginning where Yearwood exits a bath and is seen returning to her bedroom to sit on the bed while wearing only a towel wrapped around her. As the video progresses, Yearwood is seen getting dressed and leaving the house, where she is eventually soaked by the pouring rain as her former lover passes by. It aired on CMT upon its official release. The video was a departure from the wholesome image of her previous videos. Yearwood has since admitted that she was very uneasy about her family (particularly, her father) seeing her in such a provocative fashion.

== Chart performance ==
"There Goes My Baby" was released in mid-1998, and peaked at number two on the Hot Country Singles & Tracks chart later that year. It also became her first single since 1993 to reach a peak in the Billboard Hot 100 at number 93. The single would set the trend for Yearwood's next single to also chart among the Hot 100 also.

== Charts ==
=== Weekly charts ===
Chart (1998)	Peak position
Canada Country Singles (RPM)	4
US Billboard Hot 100	93
US Hot Country Songs (Billboard)	2

=== Year-end charts ===
Chart (1998)	Position
Canada Country Tracks (RPM)	8
US Country Songs (Billboard)	9
