= Real Live Woman =

2000 album by Trisha Yearwood

Studio album by Trisha Yearwood
- Released: March 28, 2000
- Studio: Sound Emporium (Nashville, Tennessee)
- Genre: Country
- Length: 47:58
- Label: MCA Nashville
- Producer: Garth Fundis, Trisha Yearwood

Trisha Yearwood chronology
Where Your Road Leads (1998)	Real Live Woman (2000)	Inside Out (2001)

Singles from Real Live Woman
- 1. "Real Live Woman" Released: January 10, 2000; 2. "Where Are You Now" Released: June 12, 2000

Professional ratings
Review scores
Source	Rating
About.com	(favorable)
Allmusic	3/5 stars
Chicago Tribune	(favorable)
Entertainment Weekly	A−
People	(favorable)
PopMatters	(favorable)
Q	3/5 stars
The Rolling Stone Album Guide	2.5/5 stars

Real Live Woman is the eighth studio album by American country music singer Trisha Yearwood, released on March 28, 2000.

The album reached #4 on the Billboard country albums chart. It produced a #16 hit on the Billboard country music charts in "Real Live Woman" and a #45 hit in "Where Are You Now". The latter was only the second single of Yearwood's career to miss Top 40 in the U.S.

The album covers a song by Bruce Springsteen called "Sad Eyes", a song by Linda Ronstadt titled, "Try Me Again", and a song by Bonnie Raitt called "Wild For You Baby". Emmylou Harris, Mary Chapin Carpenter, and Jackson Browne provide harmony vocals for some of the album's tracks. It was given 3 out of 5 stars by Allmusic.

== Track listing ==
No.	Title	Writer(s)	Length
1.	"Where Are You Now"	Mary Chapin Carpenter, Kim Richey	3:10
2.	"One Love"	Al Anderson, Gary Nicholson, Kimmie Rhodes	4:25
3.	"Sad Eyes"	Bruce Springsteen	4:10
4.	"Some Days"	Mark Selby, Tia Sillers	3:51
5.	"I Did"	Richard "Spady" Brannan, John Nance Sharp	3:53
6.	"Try Me Again"	Andrew Gold, Linda Ronstadt	4:28
7.	"Too Bad You're No Good"	Paul Craft, Cadillac Holmes	3:50
8.	"Real Live Woman"	Bobbie Cryner	3:55
9.	"I'm Still Alive"	Anderson, Matraca Berg	4:03
10.	"Wild for You Baby"	David Batteau, Tom Snow	4:32
11.	"Come Back When It Ain't Rainin'"	Berg, Harlan Howard	3:14
12.	"When a Love Song Sings the Blues"	Berg, Ronnie Samoset	4:27

=== Australian bonus tracks ===
13. "You're Where I Belong" (Diane Warren) - 4:15 (also available on the Japan pressing)
14. "Something So Right" (Paul Simon) - 4:11

== Personnel ==
- Trisha Yearwood – lead vocals, backing vocals (3, 9)
- Steve Cox – Hammond B3 organ (1–4, 8, 11), acoustic piano (8, 12), Wurlitzer electric piano (10)
- Steve Nathan – keyboards (4, 5), acoustic piano (6), Hammond B3 organ (6), harpsichord (11)
- Bobby Wood – acoustic piano (7)
- Kenny Vaughan – electric guitars (1–6, 8, 10), electric 12-string guitar (11)
- Richard Bennett – acoustic guitar (2, 10, 11, 12)
- Johnny Garcia – acoustic guitar (2, 3, 10, 11)
- Darrell Scott – bouzouki (1), acoustic guitar (3–6, 8)
- Al Anderson – acoustic guitar (9)
- Dan Dugmore – lap steel guitar (1, 2, 9, 10), acoustic guitar solo (2), steel guitar (3, 5, 6, 8), dobro (4), electric guitar (7, 11, 12), acoustic guitar (9), slide guitar (11)
- Mike Henderson – slide guitar (7)
- Sam Bush – mandolin (7)
- Keith Horne – bass (1–6, 8–12)
- Glenn Worf – bass (7)
- Greg Morrow – drums (1–6, 8, 10, 11, 12), maracas (1), tambourine (3, 4)
- Eddie Bayers – drums (7)
- Tom Roady – percussion (2, 7, 9, 10), triangle (5), tambourine (11)
- Stuart Duncan – fiddle (7, 8)
- David Campbell – string arrangements and conductor (7, 10, 12)
- Mary Chapin Carpenter – backing vocals (1)
- Kim Richey – backing vocals (1)
- Bob Bailey – backing vocals (2, 6, 8)
- Kim Fleming – backing vocals (2, 6, 8)
- Vicki Hampton – backing vocals (2, 6, 8)
- Jackson Browne – backing vocals (3)
- Stephanie Bentley – backing vocals (5)
- Emmylou Harris – backing vocals (7)
- Matraca Berg – backing vocals (9, 11)
- Gordon Kennedy – backing vocals (12)
- Wayne Kirkpatrick – backing vocals (12)

== Production ==
- Garth Fundis – producer
- Trisha Yearwood – producer
- Jeff Balding – recording
- Chuck Ainlay – mixing
- Matt Andrews – recording assistant, additional recording
- Dave Sinko – additional recording
- Mark Ralston – mix assistant
- Denny Purcell – mastering
- Scott Paschall – production assistant
- Virginia Team – art direction
- Chris Ferrara – design
- Sonya Watson – design
- Andrew Southam – photography
- Sheri McCoy – stylist
- Maria Smoot – hair stylist
- Nancy Russell – management

Studios

- Recorded at Sound Emporium (Nashville, Tennessee).
- Mixed at Sound Stage Studios (Nashville, Tennessee).
- Edited and Mastered at Georgetown Masters (Nashville, Tennessee).

== Chart performance ==
=== Album ===
Chart performance for Real Live Woman
Chart (2000)	Peak position
Australian Albums (ARIA)	98
Canadian RPM Country Albums	6
US Billboard 200	27
US Top Country Albums (Billboard)	4
UK Country Albums (OCC)	3
Scottish Albums (OCC)	67

=== Singles ===
Year	Single	Chart positions		
Year	Single	US Country	US	CAN Country
2000	"Real Live Woman"	16	81	20
2000	"Where Are You Now"	45	—	42

== Certifications ==
Certifications for Real Live Woman
Region	Certification	Certified units/sales
United States (RIAA)	Gold	500,000^{^}
^{^} Shipments figures based on certification alone.
