= Real Live Woman (song) =

2000 single by Trisha Yearwood

Single by Trisha Yearwood

from the album Real Live Woman
- B-side: "I'm Still Alive"
- Released: January 10, 2000
- Genre: Country
- Length: 3:55
- Label: MCA Nashville
- Songwriter: Bobbie Cryner
- Producers: Garth Fundis; Trisha Yearwood

Trisha Yearwood singles chronology
| "You're Where I Belong" (1999) | "Real Live Woman" (2000) | "Where Are You Now" (2000) |

"Real Live Woman" is a song written by Bobbie Cryner and recorded by American country music artist Trisha Yearwood. It was released in January 2000 as the first single and title track from her album Real Live Woman. The song reached #16 on the Billboard Hot Country Singles & Tracks chart in April 2000.

== Critical reception ==
Deborah Evans Price of Billboard gave the song a favorable review, writing that Yearwood "has the pipes and, more important, the emotional substance to turn this into a soulful, torchy tribute to acceptance, love, and fulfillment."

== Music video ==
The music video, depicting a peep show of "real live women" performing various everyday activities, was directed by Morgan Lawley and premiered in February 2000.

== Chart performance ==
| Chart (2000) | Peak position |
|---|---|
| Canada Country Singles (RPM) | 20 |
| US Billboard Hot 100 | 81 |
| US Hot Country Songs (Billboard) | 16 |

=== Year-end charts ===
| Chart (2000) | Position |
|---|---|
| US Country Songs (Billboard) | 61 |
