= I Need You (Trisha Yearwood song) =

Single by Trisha Yearwood

from the album Everybody Knows
- B-side: "Hello, I'm Gone"
- Released: March 1, 1997
- Genre: Country
- Length: 3:42
- Label: MCA
- Songwriter(s): Jess Brown, Wendell Mobley
- Producer(s): Garth Fundis

Trisha Yearwood singles chronology
"Everybody Knows" (1996)	"I Need You" (1997)	"How Do I Live" (1997)

"I Need You" is a song recorded by American country music artist Trisha Yearwood. It was released March 1997 as the third single from the album Everybody Knows. The song reached #36 on the Billboard Hot Country Singles & Tracks chart. The song was written by Jess Brown and Wendell Mobley.

== Chart performance ==
Chart (1997)	Peak position
US Hot Country Songs (Billboard)	36
Canadian RPM Country Tracks	41
