= You're Where I Belong =

Single by Trisha Yearwood

from the album Stuart Little (soundtrack) and Real Live Woman (Australian edition)
- Released: 1999
- Genre: Pop; dance
- Length: 4:15
- Label: Motown; Universal
- Songwriter: Diane Warren
- Producer: Keith Thomas

Trisha Yearwood singles chronology
"I'll Still Love You More" (1999)	"You're Where I Belong" (1999)	"Real Live Woman" (2000)

"You're Where I Belong" is a song written by American songwriter Diane Warren that was originally recorded by American country music singer Trisha Yearwood. The song was released on the soundtrack for the 1999 film, Stuart Little and was released as a single the same year. The song reached multiple Billboard charts following its release. It was included as a bonus track on the Australian release of Yearwood's eighth album, Real Live Woman.

== Background, content and release ==
"You're Where I Belong" was written by pop songwriter Diane Warren. In 1999, the song was recorded by Trisha Yearwood to serve as part of the soundtrack for the film version of Stuart Little. The track was produced by Keith Thomas. It was Yearwood's first collaboration with Thomas in her career. "You're Where I Belong" was released as a single via Motown and Universal Music Group in 1999. It was released as a CD single. The music video features Yearwood singing the song while walking through a movie theatre and backstage with clips of the film Stuart Little on different television screens. She eventually sings in front of a movie screen with clips in front of an audience. The screen rises and reveals an orchestra.

== Reception ==
=== Critical ===
The single received mixed to positive reviews. Fred Bronson of Billboard magazine commented on the song in his commentary related to singles written by Diane Warren in 2000: "Unfortunately, the song's placement in the move [Stuart Little] -- the second song played over the end's credits -- precludes it from earning an Oscar nomination for best song." It was released on the film's soundtrack in November 1999. Heather Phares of Allmusic mentioned the song in her review of the album, calling it "not just for kids."

=== Commercial ===
The single appeared on multiple record charts following its release to radio in 1999. It spent one week on the Billboard Hot Country Songs chart in February 2000, peaking at number 71. It also was Yearwood's first (and only) charting single on the Billboard Hot Dance Club Songs chart, peaking at number 15 in 2000 after 15 weeks on the list. In Canada, the song reached positions on the RPM record charts, including the Country Songs list, where it reached number 73.

== Track listing ==
CD single

- "You're Where I Belong" – 4:15
- "You're Where I Belong (Soul Solution Club Mix)" – 10:05
- "You're Where I Belong (Soul Solution Dub)" – 6:31
- "You're Where I Belong (Soul Solution Radio)" – 4:21

== Charts ==
Chart (1999–2000)	Peak position
Australia (ARIA)	145
Canada Adult Contemporary Songs (RPM)	81
Canada Country Songs (RPM)	73
US Hot Country Songs (Billboard)	71
US Hot Dance/Electronic Songs (Billboard)	15
