= Where Your Road Leads =

Studio album by Trisha Yearwood
- Released: July 14, 1998
- Studio: Ocean Way, Nashville; Jack's Tracks, Nashville
- Genre: Country
- Length: 41:20
- Label: MCA Nashville
- Producer: Tony Brown and Trisha Yearwood (tracks 1–10), Allen Reynolds (track 11)

Trisha Yearwood chronology
(Songbook) A Collection of Hits (1997)	Where Your Road Leads (1998)	Real Live Woman (2000)

Singles from Where Your Road Leads
- 1. "There Goes My Baby" Released: April 28, 1998; 2. "Where Your Road Leads" Released: September 7, 1998; 3. "Powerful Thing" Released: November 16, 1998; 4. "I'll Still Love You More" Released: April 26, 1999

Professional ratings
Review scores
Source	Rating
AllMusic	4/5 stars
Chicago Tribune	(favorable)
Entertainment Weekly	C+
The Rolling Stone Album Guide	3/5 stars

Where Your Road Leads is the seventh studio album by American country music singer Trisha Yearwood, released in 1998 by MCA Nashville.

The album reached #3 on the Billboard country albums chart. The singles "There Goes My Baby", "Where Your Road Leads", "Powerful Thing" and "I'll Still Love You More" were all released from this album, peaking at #2, #18, #6 and #10, respectively, on the Billboard country music charts between 1998 and 1999. The title track was co-written by Victoria Shaw, who originally recorded it on her 1995 album In Full View. Buddy Miller provides harmony vocals on the track "Bring Me All Your Lovin'." "I'll Still Love You More" was written by Diane Warren, who also wrote Yearwood's hit from the previous year, "How Do I Live."

== Track listing ==
No.	Title	Writer(s)	Length
1.	"There Goes My Baby"	Annie Roboff, Arnie Roman	3:49
2.	"Never Let You Go Again"	Gordon Kennedy, Wayne Kirkpatrick, Tommy Sims	3:17
3.	"That Ain't the Way I Heard It"	Jamie O'Hara	3:48
4.	"Powerful Thing"	Al Anderson, Sharon Vaughn	2:56
5.	"Love Wouldn't Lie to Me"	Terry Radigan, Don Schlitz	3:47
6.	"Wouldn't Any Woman"	Bob DiPiero, Michele McCord, Mark D. Sanders	3:25
7.	"I'll Still Love You More"	Diane Warren	4:26
8.	"Heart Like a Sad Song"	Roboff, Roman	3:19
9.	"I Don't Want to Be the One"	Paul Brady, Carole King	4:04
10.	"Bring Me All Your Lovin'"	Kenny Greenberg, Allison Moorer, Doyle Primm	5:08
11.	"Where Your Road Leads" (duet with Garth Brooks)	Desmond Child, Victoria Shaw	3:26
12.	"One More Chance" (Australia/Japan bonus track)	JD Souther, Jack Tempchin	3:30
13.	"I Have a Love [Live]" (Japan bonus track)		3:43

== Personnel ==
=== Musicians ===
As listed in liner notes.

- Trisha Yearwood – lead vocals, backing vocals
- John Hobbs – acoustic piano, keyboards
- Steve Nathan – acoustic piano, keyboards, Hammond organ, additional strings (11)
- Matt Rollings – acoustic piano, keyboards
- Bobby Wood – acoustic piano, organ
- Larry Byrom – acoustic guitar, electric guitar
- Mark Casstevens – acoustic guitar
- Steve Gibson – acoustic guitar, electric guitar, mandolin
- Kenny Greenberg – electric guitar
- Chris Leuzinger – electric guitar
- Brent Mason – electric guitar, six-string bass
- Steuart Smith – electric guitar
- Paul Franklin – steel guitar
- Sam Bush – mandolin
- Mike Chapman – bass
- Michael Rhodes – bass
- Paul Leim – drums, percussion
- Milton Sledge – drums, percussion
- Stuart Duncan – fiddle
- Conni Ellisor – string arrangements (8, 11)
- The Nashville String Machine – strings (8, 11)
- Al Anderson – backing vocals
- Tim Buppert – backing vocals
- Tabitha Fair – backing vocals
- Gordon Kennedy – backing vocals
- Wayne Kirkpatrick – backing vocals
- Buddy Miller – backing vocals
- Kim Richey – backing vocals
- John Wesley Ryles – backing vocals
- Harry Stinson – backing vocals
- Garth Brooks – lead vocals (11)

Choir on "Where Your Road Leads"

- Lisa Cochran, Mike Eldred, Kim Fleming, Vicki Hampton, Mark Ivey, Lisa Silver, Bergen White and Dennis Wilson. Choral vocals arranged by Bergen White.

=== Production ===
- Tony Brown – producer (1–10)
- Trisha Yearwood – producer (1–10)
- Allen Reynolds – producer (11)
- Rory Kaplan – executive producer
- Bill Neighbors – executive producer
- Jeff Balding – recording, overdub recording
- Mark Miller – recording
- Steve Marcantonio – overdub recording
- Mark Hagan – assistant engineer
- Joe Hayden – assistant engineer
- Duke Duczer – recording assistant
- David Hall – recording assistant
- Glenn Spinner – recording assistant, overdub recording assistant
- Tim Waters – recording assistant, additional overdub recording
- Russ Martin – additional overdub recording
- Chuck Ainlay – mixing
- Mark Ralston – mix assistant
- Don Cobb – digital editing
- Denny Purcell – mastering
- Jeff Levison – remastering
- Ric Wilson – remastering
- Jessie Noble – project coordinator
- Beth Middleworth – art direction, design
- Russ Harrington – photography
- Mary Beth Felts – make-up
- Maria Smoot – hair stylist
- Sheri McCoy-Hanes – stylist
- Kragen & Co. – management

Studios

- Recorded at Ocean Way Nashville and Jack's Tracks Recording Studios (Nashville, Tennessee).
- Overdubbed at Ocean Way Recording and Emerald Sound Studios (Nashville, Tennessee).
- Mixed at The Sound Kitchen (Franklin, Tennessee) and Jack's Tracks Recording Studios.
- Mastered at Georgetown Masters (Nashville, Tennessee).

== Charts ==
=== Weekly charts ===
Chart (1998)	Peak position
Australian Albums (ARIA)	32
Canadian Albums (RPM)	41
Canadian Country Albums (RPM)	2
Swiss Albums (Schweizer Hitparade)	50
US Billboard 200	33
US Top Country Albums (Billboard)	3
UK Country Albums (OCC)	2
Scottish Albums (OCC)	51

=== Year-end charts ===
Chart (1998)	Position
US Top Country Albums (Billboard)	28
Chart (1999)	Position
US Top Country Albums (Billboard)	28

=== Singles ===
Year	Single	Peak chart positions		
Year	Single	US Country	US	CAN Country
1998	"There Goes My Baby"	2	93	4
1998	"Where Your Road Leads" (with Garth Brooks)	18	—	18
1999	"Powerful Thing"	6	50	1
1999	"I'll Still Love You More"	10	65	6

== Certifications ==
Region	Certification	Certified units/sales
Canada (Music Canada)	Gold	50,000^{^}
United States (RIAA)	Platinum	1,000,000^{^}
^{^} Shipments figures based on certification alone.
