= Where Your Road Leads (song) =

Single by Trisha Yearwood with Garth Brooks

from the album Where Your Road Leads
- B-side: "Bring Me All Your Lovin'"
- Released: September 7, 1998
- Genre: Country
- Length: 3:27
- Label: MCA Nashville
- Songwriters: Victoria Shaw, Desmond Child
- Producer: Allen Reynolds

Trisha Yearwood singles chronology
"There Goes My Baby" (1998)	"Where Your Road Leads" (1998)	"Powerful Thing" (1998)

Garth Brooks singles chronology
"You Move Me" (1998)	"Where Your Road Leads" (1998)	"It's Your Song" (1998)

"Where Your Road Leads" is a song written by Victoria Shaw and Desmond Child, and recorded by American country music artists Trisha Yearwood and Garth Brooks. It was released in September 1998 as the second single and title track from Yearwood's album Where Your Road Leads. The song reached #18 on the Billboard Hot Country Singles & Tracks chart.

Shaw previously recorded the song on her 1995 album In Full View.

== Critical reception ==
Deborah Evans Price, of Billboard magazine reviewed the song favorably, calling it a "gorgeous lyric." She goes on to say that Yearwood's "strong, supple voice beautifully conveys the passionate commitment in the words, and Brooks' warm demeanor provides affecting support." On the production, she says that it at times "comes perilously close to bombast."

== Chart performance ==
"Where Your Road Leads" debuted at number 58 on the U.S. Billboard Hot Country Singles & Tracks for the week of September 19, 1998.

Chart (1998)	Peak position
Canada Country Singles (RPM)	18
US Hot Country Songs (Billboard)	18
