= Everybody Knows (Trisha Yearwood song) =

Single by Trisha Yearwood

from the album Everybody Knows
- B-side: "A Lover Is Forever"
- Released: October 28, 1996
- Genre: Country
- Length: 3:14
- Label: MCA Nashville
- Songwriters: Matraca Berg; Gary Harrison
- Producer: Garth Fundis

Trisha Yearwood singles chronology
"Believe Me Baby (I Lied)" (1996)	"Everybody Knows" (1996)	"I Need You" (1997)

"Everybody Knows" is a song written by Matraca Berg and Gary Harrison, and recorded by American country music artist Trisha Yearwood. It was released in October 1996 as the second single from her album of the same name. The song reached number 3 on the US Billboard Hot Country Singles & Tracks chart in February 1997 and number 1 on the RPM Country Tracks chart in Canada.

== Music video ==
The music video was directed by Gerry Wenner and premiered in November 1996.

== Chart performance ==
"Everybody Knows" debuted at number 57 on the U.S. Billboard Hot Country Singles & Tracks for the week of November 9, 1996.

Chart (1996–1997)	Peak position
Canada Country Singles (RPM)	1
US Hot Country Songs (Billboard)	3

=== Year-end charts ===
Chart (1997)	Position
Canada Country Tracks (RPM)	34
US Country Songs (Billboard)	54
