= The Sweetest Gift (Trisha Yearwood album) =

Studio album by Trisha Yearwood
- Released: September 13, 1994
- Recorded: 1994
- Studio: Sound Emporium (Nashville, Tennessee)
- Genre: Christmas
- Length: 32:32
- Label: MCA Nashville
- Producer: Garth Fundis

Trisha Yearwood chronology
The Song Remembers When: A Live Concert Performance (1993)	The Sweetest Gift (1994)	Thinkin' About You (1995)

Alternative cover
- 2000 re-release

Professional ratings
Review scores
Source	Rating
Allmusic	4/5 stars
Entertainment Weekly	(favorable)
The Rolling Stone Album Guide	3/5 stars

The Sweetest Gift is the fourth studio album (and first Christmas album) by country singer Trisha Yearwood.

== Composition and release ==
Yearwood sings a mixture of familiar traditional and popular material, along with more recent compositions such as "It Wasn't His Child" and "There's a New Kid in Town".

Two of its tracks managed to achieve positions near the lower end of the Billboard Hot Country Singles chart. "It Wasn't His Child" peaked at #60, and "Reindeer Boogie" at #63. The album rose to the #17 position in the Country Albums chart. A re-release of the album in 2000 has a different album cover, a promotional photograph taken during the Real Live Woman promotional period.

== Reception ==
The album was a given a positive review by Allmusic, receiving 4 out of 5 stars.

== Track listing ==
1. "Sweet Little Jesus Boy" (Bob MacGimsey) – 2:42
2. "Reindeer Boogie" (Charlie Faircloth, Hank Snow, Cordia Volkmar) – 2:38
3. "Take a Walk Through Bethlehem" (Ashley Cleveland, John Barlow Jarvis, Wally Wilson) – 3:49
4. "Santa Claus Is Back in Town" (Jerry Leiber, Mike Stoller) – 3:00
5. "It Wasn't His Child" (Skip Ewing) – 3:54
6. "Away in a Manger" (traditional) – 2:39
7. "The Sweetest Gift" (James Coats) – 3:02
8. "There's a New Kid in Town" (Don Cook, Curly Putman, Keith Whitley) – 4:27
9. "Let It Snow! Let It Snow! Let It Snow!" (Sammy Cahn, Jule Styne) – 2:26
10. "The Christmas Song" (Mel Tormé, Robert Wells) – 3:58

== Personnel ==
=== Musicians ===
- Trisha Yearwood – lead vocals, harmony vocals (2, 5, 6, 7)
- Steve Nathan – keyboards (1), acoustic piano (2, 3, 5–10)
- Matt Rollings – acoustic piano (1)
- Becky Priest – acoustic piano (4)
- Billy Joe Walker Jr. – acoustic guitar (2, 3, 5–10)
- Bobby All – acoustic guitar (4)
- Biff Watson – acoustic guitar (7)
- Dann Huff – electric guitar (2)
- Brent Mason – electric guitar (3, 5–10)
- Johnny Garcia – electric guitar (4)
- Paul Franklin – steel guitar (2, 3, 5, 6, 8, 9, 10), dobro (7)
- Stuart Duncan – mandolin (7), fiddle (7)
- Dave Pomeroy – bass (2, 3, 5–10)
- Jay Hager – bass (4)
- Eddie Bayers – drums (2, 3, 5–10)
- Rick McClure – drums (4)
- Sam Bacco – percussion (3, 5, 9)
- Kirk "Jelly Roll" Johnson – harmonica (1, 10)
- Aubrey Haynie – fiddle (2)
- Heather Risser – fiddle (4)
- John Hobbs – string arrangements (5, 6, 8)
- Ashley Cleveland – harmony vocals (3)
- Garth Fundis – harmony vocals (5)
- Beth Yearwood Bernard – harmony vocals (7)

The Nashville String Machine

- Bob Mason – cello
- Jim Grosjean – viola
- Lee Larrison – viola
- Kristin Wilkinson – viola
- David Davidson – violin
- Connie Ellisor – violin
- Carl Gorodetzky – violin
- Pamela Sixfin – violin
- Alan Umstead – violin
- Mary Kathryn Vanosdale – violin

=== Production ===
- Garth Fundis – producer, mixing
- Gary Laney – recording
- Dave Sinko – recording, mixing
- Carlos Grier – digital editing
- Denny Purcell – mastering
- Georgetown Masters (Nashville, Tennessee) – mastering location
- Scott Paschall – production assistant
- Katherine DeVault – art direction, design
- Jim "Señor" McGuire – photography

2000 Reissue

- Randee St. Nicholas – photography
- Virginia Team – art direction
- Jerry Joyner – design
- Debra Wingo – hair stylist

== Charts ==
=== Album ===
Chart (1994)	Peak position
US Top Country Albums (Billboard)	17
US Billboard 200	105
US Top Holiday Albums (Billboard)	17

=== Singles ===
Title	Date	Chart	Peak position
"It Wasn't His Child"	January 6, 1995	US Hot Country Songs (Billboard)	60
"Reindeer Boogie"	January 8, 1999	US Hot Country Songs (Billboard)	63

== Certifications ==
Region	Certification	Certified units/sales
United States (RIAA)	Gold	500,000^{^}
^{^} Shipments figures based on certification alone.
