= The Song Remembers When (song) =

Single by Trisha Yearwood

from the album The Song Remembers When
- B-side: "Oh Lonesome You"
- Released: October 12, 1993
- Studio: Sound Emporium (Nashville, Tennessee)
- Genre: Country
- Length: 3:56
- Label: MCA
- Songwriter: Hugh Prestwood
- Producer: Garth Fundis

Trisha Yearwood singles chronology
"Down on My Knees" (1993)	"The Song Remembers When" (1993)	"Better Your Heart Than Mine" (1994)

Music video
- "The Song Remembers When" on YouTube

"The Song Remembers When" is a song written by Hugh Prestwood and recorded by American country music singer Trisha Yearwood. It was released in October 1993 by MCA Records as the lead single and title track from her third album, The Song Remembers When (1993). A music video was created using live footage from a televised concert Trisha did to promote the album; it was directed by Steve Purcell. The song was covered by Kristin Chenoweth for her 2005 album As I Am.

== Background ==
"The Song Remembers When" is a slow ballad written by Hugh Prestwood. It was originally recorded by Kathy Mattea but was dropped from her album in the final stages of production. It was then picked up by Trisha Yearwood, who recorded it as the title track of her third studio album.

== Content ==
The song is a testament to the way that music can instantly trigger a memory that was seemingly forgotten. The woman in the song is waiting for change at a counter when she hears a familiar song. Out of nowhere, she is suddenly reminded of a time when she and a former lover sang along to the song on the radio as they drove through the Rocky Mountains. She recalls that she tried many ways to rid herself of the memories of that failed romance, only to have them come rushing back in an instant when she hears a song attached to a moment in their time together:

After driving out the memory of the way things might have been
After I'd forgotten all about us
The song remembers when

As the song progresses, the woman reveals that, although she can't remember why the relationship failed, the song can, with the time passed and the distance between them suddenly irrelevant.

In the end, it becomes a powerful statement that any forgotten memory can be brought back to life for anyone in the world through the power of music.

Still, I guess some things we bury are just bound to rise again
For even if the whole world has forgotten
The song remembers when

== Chart performance ==
Yearwood was enjoying the success of a string of hit singles from her two prior albums, "Trisha Yearwood" and "Hearts in Armor." "The Song Remembers When" was released in late 1993 as a follow-up. The single became a major hit that year, peaking at #2 on the Billboard Country Singles Chart, and became her first single to chart on the Billboard Hot 100, peaking at #82. It also reached #4 on the RPM country charts in Canada. This song also won an Emmy for being featured in a one-hour musical special, Trisha Yearwood: The Song Remembers When, on the Disney Channel.

The single was one of several major hits Yearwood would have over the next couple of years, including: "How Do I Live," "In Another's Eyes," and "Perfect Love."

== Charts ==
=== Weekly charts ===
Chart (1993–1994)	Peak position
Canada Country Singles (RPM)	4
US Billboard Hot 100	82
US Hot Country Songs (Billboard)	2
US Cash Box Top 100	88

=== Year-end charts ===
Chart (1994)	Position
Canada Country Tracks (RPM)	99
