= Every Girl in This Town =

Single by Trisha Yearwood

from the album Every Girl
- Released: June 6, 2019
- Genre: Country
- Length: 2:58
- Label: Gwendolyn
- Songwriters: Erik Dylan; Connie Harrington; Caitlyn Smith
- Producer: Garth Fundis

Trisha Yearwood singles chronology
"Broken" (2016)	"Every Girl in This Town" (2019)	"I'll Carry You Home" (2020)

"Every Girl in This Town" is a song written by Erik Dylan, Connie Harrington and Caitlyn Smith, and recorded by American country music artist Trisha Yearwood. It was released on June 6, 2019, as the lead single from her fifteenth studio album, Every Girl, her first album of original music since Heaven, Heartache and the Power of Love (2007).

Yearwood announced the Every Girl on Tour, her first solo tour in five years, in promotion of her new music.

== Content ==
The song was written by Erik Dylan, Connie Harrington and Caitlyn Smith and has been described as a "scintillating, slow-building power ballad" with "a message of empowerment and solidarity to young girls and women everywhere." Yearwood referred to the song as emotional and inspiring, and said the lyrics reminded her of herself as "that little girl who believed anything and everything was possible" and that it serves a reminder to just be yourself.

== Music video ==
The music video was directed by Blythe Thomas and premiered on June 28, 2019. In the video, Yearwood is seen performing the song against a set made up of baby blue wallpaper and a similarly colored blanket. She is shown with women of all ages embracing their inner beauty, while other home video footage of women celebrating is also seen. It ends with Yearwood and all the women throwing their hands up in the air in celebration and rejoice.

== Chart performance ==
"Every Girl in This Town" debuted at number 21 on the Billboard Country Airplay chart dated June 15, 2019, marking the highest chart debut of her career, surpassing the number 36 start for "Love Will Always Win" in 2006. It also makes it her first top 40 hit since "This Is Me You're Talking To" in 2008.

Chart (2019)	Peak position
US Country Airplay (Billboard)	21
US Hot Country Songs (Billboard)	49
