= Better Your Heart Than Mine =

Single by Trisha Yearwood

from the album The Song Remembers When
- B-side: "Hard Promises to Keep"
- Released: February 5, 1994
- Studio: Sound Emporium (Nashville, Tennessee)
- Genre: Country
- Length: 3:52
- Label: MCA
- Songwriter(s): Lisa Angelle, Andrew Gold
- Producer(s): Garth Fundis

Trisha Yearwood singles chronology
"The Song Remembers When" (1993)	"Better Your Heart Than Mine" (1994)	"XXX's and OOO's (An American Girl)" (1994)

"Better Your Heart Than Mine" is a song recorded by American country music artist Trisha Yearwood. It was released in February 1994 as the second single from the album The Song Remembers When. The song reached #21 on the Billboard Hot Country Singles & Tracks chart. The song was written by Lisa Angelle and Andrew Gold.

== Chart performance ==
Chart (1994)	Peak position
US Hot Country Songs (Billboard)	21
Canadian RPM Country Tracks	21
