= Believe Me Baby (I Lied) =

Single by Trisha Yearwood

from the album Everybody Knows
- B-side: "Little Hercules"
- Released: July 2, 1996
- Genre: Country
- Length: 3:42
- Label: MCA
- Songwriters: Angelo Petraglia, Kim Richey, Larry Gottlieb
- Producer: Garth Fundis

Trisha Yearwood singles chronology
"On a Bus to St. Cloud" (1995)	"Believe Me Baby (I Lied)" (1996)	"Everybody Knows" (1996)

"Believe Me Baby (I Lied)" is a song recorded by American country music artist Trisha Yearwood. It was released in July 1996 as the lead single from her album, Everybody Knows. It was Yearwood's fourth single out of five during the course of her career to reach number one on the Billboard Hot Country Songs chart.

== Content ==
The song depicts a woman who is apologizing to her lover after saying she wanted him out of her life. She realized it had really been her "wounded pride" telling the lover to leave.

The song was written by Kim Richey, Angelo Petraglia and Larry Gottlieb and was the first single from her album, Everybody Knows. The song was a number 1 country hit for Yearwood and the title track of the album reached the Top 5 later in 1997. The song was done in an Adult Contemporary-like style according to Allmusic.com.

== Critical reception ==
Deborah Evans Price, of Billboard magazine reviewed the song favorably, saying that the song's "strong and sure melody and its well-crafted lyrics are buoyed by Yearwood's expressive voice."

== Music video ==
A music video was also made shortly before the song's release, showcasing Yearwood and friends in retro outfits, vintage glasses and vivid colors and backdrops. As revealed in an interview on CMT's Video bio, some of the clothing Yearwood wore in the video was raided from the closet of her then-husband Robert Reynolds. The video debuted on CMT on June 26, 1996 during The CMT Delivery Room.

== Chart performance ==
Chart (1996)	Peak position
Canada Country Singles (RPM)	1
US Hot Country Songs (Billboard)	1

=== Year-end charts ===
Chart (1996)	Position
Canada Country Tracks (RPM)	47
US Country Songs (Billboard)	22
