= You Say You Will =

Single by Trisha Yearwood

from the album Hearts in Armor
- B-side: "Hearts in Armor"
- Released: March 1, 1993
- Studio: Sound Emporium (Nashville, Tennessee)
- Genre: Country
- Length: 3:38
- Label: MCA
- Songwriters: Beth Nielsen Chapman; Verlon Thompson
- Producer: Garth Fundis

Trisha Yearwood singles chronology
"Walkaway Joe" (1993)	"You Say You Will" (1993)	"Down on My Knees" (1993)

"You Say You Will" is a song written by Beth Nielsen Chapman and Verlon Thompson. It was originally recorded by Holly Dunn for her 1992 album Getting It Dunn and later by American country music artist Trisha Yearwood. It was released in March 1993. Yearwood's version was the third single from her album Hearts in Armor. The song reached number 12 on the Billboard Hot Country Singles & Tracks chart in May 1993.

Chapman also recorded the song on her 1993 LP, You Hold the Key.

== Chart performance ==
"You Say You Will" debuted at number 58 on the U.S. Billboard Hot Country Singles & Tracks for the week of March 6, 1993.

Chart (1993)	Peak position
Canada Country Singles (RPM)	24
US Hot Country Songs (Billboard)	12
