= Down on My Knees =

Single by Trisha Yearwood

from the album Hearts in Armor
- B-side: "For Reason I've Forgotten"
- Released: June 7, 1993
- Studio: Sound Emporium (Nashville, Tennessee)
- Genre: Country
- Length: 3:40
- Label: MCA
- Songwriter: Beth Nielsen Chapman
- Producer: Garth Fundis

Trisha Yearwood singles chronology
"You Say You Will" (1993)	"Down on My Knees" (1993)	"The Song Remembers When" (1993)

"Down on My Knees" is a song written by Beth Nielsen Chapman and recorded by American country music artist Trisha Yearwood. It was released in June 1993 as the fourth single from the album Hearts in Armor. The song reached number 19 on the Billboard Hot Country Singles & Tracks chart.

== Content ==
The narrator, a secure and strong woman, describes how she would unabashedly beg on her knees for her lover to stay if he chose to leave her.

== Music video ==
The music video was directed by Gerry Wenner and premiered in mid-1993. It was filmed in Los Angeles, California.

== Chart performance ==
"Down on My Knees" debuted at number 70 on the U.S. Billboard Hot Country Singles & Tracks for the week of June 12, 1993.

Chart (1993)	Peak position
Canada Country Singles (RPM)	21
US Hot Country Songs (Billboard)	19
