= Matraca Berg =

American singer-songwriter (born 1964)

- Berg in 2007

Background information
- Born: Matraca Maria Berg; February 3, 1964 (age 62); Nashville, Tennessee, U.S.
- Genres: Country, pop
- Occupation: singer-songwriter
- Instruments: Vocals, guitar, harmonica
- Years active: 1982–present
- Labels: RCA Nashville, Rising Tide, Eagle
- Spouse: Jeff Hanna (m. 1993)
- Website: Matraca Berg Official Site

Matraca Maria Berg Hanna (/məˈtreɪsə/; born February 3, 1964) is an American country music singer and songwriter. She has released five albums: three for RCA Records, one for Rising Tide Records and one for Dualtone Records, and has charted in the top 40 of the U.S. Billboard country chart with "Baby, Walk On" and "The Things You Left Undone," both at No. 36. Besides most of her own material, Berg has written hits for T.G. Sheppard, Karen Brooks, Trisha Yearwood, Deana Carter, Patty Loveless, Kenny Chesney and others. In 2008 she was inducted into the Nashville Songwriters Hall of Fame and in 2018 she received the Poet's Award from the Academy of Country Music Awards. Since 1993 she has been married to Jeff Hanna of the Nitty Gritty Dirt Band.

== Early history ==
Matraca Maria Berg was born February 3, 1964, in Nashville, Tennessee. Berg's mother, Icie Calloway, moved from Harlan County, Kentucky, to Nashville in the 1960s to seek her fortune as a singer and songwriter, shortly before Matraca was born. Matraca's aunt, Sudie Calloway, was a successful Music Row backing singer. Aunts Coleida Calloway and Clara Howard were backing vocalists on Kentucky's Renfro Valley Barn Dance. Uncle Jim Baker was a steel guitar player who also spent some time running Mel Tillis's song publishing companies. When Matraca was two years old, her mother married nuclear physicist Ron Berg, who legally adopted Matraca.

Berg's mother found only limited success in the music industry and eventually became a nurse. Berg herself then took up songwriting with her mother's encouragement. When Berg played her songs for songwriter Bobby Braddock, he volunteered to co-write with her. She found her earliest success in their collaboration, "Faking Love", which was sung by Karen Brooks and T. G. Sheppard, topping the Billboard Hot Country Singles (now Hot Country Songs) chart on February 19, 1983.

== Career history ==
After her mother's death in 1984, Berg continued to have success writing songs for other performers. Reba McEntire had a No. 1 song with her "The Last One to Know", and Randy Travis, Tanya Tucker, Ray Price, Marie Osmond, Sweethearts of the Rodeo, Michelle Wright and others recorded her songs.

Berg signed to a recording contract with RCA Records Nashville in 1990, releasing her debut album, Lying to the Moon, produced by Wendy Waldman and Josh Leo, that year. Leo later recalled that the sessions deliberately broke with Nashville convention, using oboe and cello alongside banjos and fiddles, saying "there were no limits with Matraca." Its first two singles, "Baby, Walk On" and "The Things You Left Undone," both charted in the country top 40 at No. 36, followed by the No. 43 "I Got It Bad" and No. 55 "I Must Have Been Crazy."

She was nominated for Top New Female Vocalist by the Academy of Country Music in 1991, losing to Shelby Lynne.

What was to be her follow-up album, Bittersweet Surrender, was recorded in 1991. It featured the single "It's Easy to Tell," which charted in November 1991. The album was rejected by the label, which wanted a more mainstream-sounding recording instead. One of the songs from this canceled album, "Wrong Side of Memphis," later became a Top Ten hit for Trisha Yearwood. She continued to write for others, and in 1994, released a pop album The Speed of Grace.

Berg's 1995 song, "You Can Feel Bad", co-written with Tim Krekel and recorded by Patty Loveless, was a No. 1 country single, spending twenty weeks on the chart.

Berg co-wrote "Strawberry Wine" along with Gary Harrison, which Deana Carter released as a single. Berg won the "Song of the Year" at the 1997 CMA (Country Music Association) Awards. That year Berg became the first woman to have five No. 1 country songs within a single year.

The same year, she released the album Sunday Morning to Saturday Night via Rising Tide Records; it produced the singles "That Train Don't Run" and "Back in the Saddle," the former of which was released by Pinmonkey in 2006. In 1999, RCA released a compilation album entitled Lying to the Moon & Other Stories which also included tracks from her 1997 Rising Tide release.

In 2004 and 2005, Berg was nominated for induction into the Nashville Songwriters Hall of Fame, making her one of the youngest nominees in history. She was inducted in 2008. In 2023, BMI presented Berg with the BMI Icon Award; previous country recipients of the honor include Dolly Parton, Loretta Lynn, Willie Nelson and Kris Kristofferson.

== Personal life ==
She currently lives in Nashville with her husband, Jeff Hanna, a founding member of the Nitty Gritty Dirt Band. They were married December 5, 1993. The couple met while touring with Clint Black in the late 1980s.

== Discography ==
=== Albums ===
Title	Album details	Peak chart positions		
Title	Album details	US Country	US Heat	CAN Country
Lying to the Moon	Release date: September 25, 1990; Label: RCA Nashville	43	—	—
The Speed of Grace	Release date: March 1, 1994; Label: RCA Records	—	—	—
Sunday Morning to Saturday Night	Release date: September 23, 1997; Label: Rising Tide Records	48	—	22
The Masters	Release date: 1998; Label: Eagle Records	—	—	—
Lying to the Moon and Other Stories	Release date: August 10, 1999; Label: RCA Nashville	—	—	—
The Dreaming Fields	Release date: May 17, 2011; Label: Dualtone Records	42	7	—
Love's Truck Stop	Release date: October 21, 2012; Label: Proper Records	—	—	—
"—" denotes releases that did not chart

=== Singles ===
Year	Single	Peak chart positions		Album
Year	Single	US Country	CAN Country	Album
1990	"Baby, Walk On"	36	61	Lying to the Moon
1990	"The Things You Left Undone"	36	44	Lying to the Moon
1991	"I Got It Bad"	43	30	Lying to the Moon
1991	"I Must Have Been Crazy"	55	58	Lying to the Moon
1991	"It's Easy to Tell"	66	—	Bittersweet Surrender (unreleased)
1993	"Slow Poison"	—	—	The Speed of Grace
1997	"That Train Don't Run"	59	70	Sunday Morning to Saturday Night
1997	"Back When We Were Beautiful"	—	—	Sunday Morning to Saturday Night
1998	"Back in the Saddle"	51	74	Sunday Morning to Saturday Night
"—" denotes releases that did not chart

=== Music videos ===
Year	Video	Director
1990	"Baby, Walk On"	Dave Bridges
1990	"The Things You Left Undone"	Geoff Adams
1991	"I Got It Bad"	Dave Bridges
1991	"It's Easy to Tell"	Gustavo Garzon
1997	"That Train Don't Run"	Roger Pistole
1998	"Back in the Saddle" (with Patty Loveless, Suzy Bogguss, Martina McBride, Faith Hill and Trisha Yearwood)	Steven Goldmann
1999	"Lying to the Moon"	Steven Goldmann
2012	"The Dreaming Fields"	Jon Morgan

== Singles written by Berg ==
Year	Title	Artist(s)
1983	"Faking Love"	T. G. Sheppard and Karen Brooks
1987	"The Last One to Know"	Reba McEntire
1987	"Just Enough Love"	Ray Price
1989	"Promises, Promises"	Lori Yates
1991	"I'm That Kind of Girl"	Patty Loveless
1992	"Wrong Side of Memphis"	Trisha Yearwood
1993	"Hey Cinderella"	Suzy Bogguss
1994	"XXX's and OOO's (An American Girl)"	Trisha Yearwood
1994	"Somebody's Leavin'"	Patricia Conroy
1995	"Walk On"	Linda Ronstadt
1995	"You Can Feel Bad"	Patty Loveless
1996	"Strawberry Wine"	Deana Carter
1996	"We Danced Anyway"	Deana Carter
1996	"Give Me Some Wheels"	Suzy Bogguss
1996	"Wild Angels"	Martina McBride
1997	"Cry on the Shoulder of the Road"	Martina McBride
1997	"Still Holding On"	Martina McBride and Clint Black
1997	"Everybody Knows"	Trisha Yearwood
1997	"Oh Romeo"	Mindy McCready
1998	"Somebody to Love"	Suzy Bogguss
1999	"Fool, I'm a Woman"	Sara Evans
1999	"All I Want Is Everything"	Mindy McCready
2001	"If I Fall You're Going Down with Me"	Dixie Chicks
2003	"You're Still Here"	Faith Hill
2003	"On Your Way Home"	Patty Loveless
2004	"98.6 Degrees and Fallin'"	Jill King
2005	"I Don't Feel Like Loving You Today"	Gretchen Wilson
2006	"That Train Don't Run"	Pinmonkey
2008	"They Call It Falling for a Reason"	Trisha Yearwood
2008	"Misery Loves Company"	One More Girl
2011	"You and Tequila"	Kenny Chesney and Grace Potter
2013	"Back When We Were Beautiful"	Emmylou Harris and Rodney Crowell

== Filmography ==
Year	Title	Role	Notes
1987	Made in Heaven	Studio Singer	Cameo; performed the song "We've Never Danced"
