= The Way That I Am =

Studio album by Martina McBride
- Released: September 14, 1993
- Studio: Javelina (Nashville, Tennessee); Money Pit (Nashville, Tennessee); Music Mill (Nashville, Tennessee); Sound Emporium (Nashville, Tennessee)
- Genre: Country
- Length: 34:05
- Label: RCA Nashville
- Producer: Paul Worley; Martina McBride; Ed Seay

Martina McBride chronology
The Time Has Come (1992)	The Way That I Am (1993)	Wild Angels (1995)

Alternative cover
- Cover of the international release.

Singles from The Way That I Am
- 1. "My Baby Loves Me" Released: July 12, 1993; 2. "Life #9" Released: January 3, 1994; 3. "Independence Day" Released: May 2, 1994; 4. "Heart Trouble" Released: October 22, 1994; 5. "Where I Used to Have a Heart" Released: 1995

Professional ratings
Review scores
Source	Rating
AllMusic	4/5 stars
Robert Christgau	(choice cut)
Music Week	4/5 stars
Rolling Stone	(favorable)

The Way That I Am is the second studio album by American country music singer Martina McBride, released on September 14, 1993, through RCA Nashville. It was certified Platinum on May 15, 1995, by the Recording Industry Association of America (RIAA). This was her breakthrough album, producing her first Top 5 hit in "My Baby Loves Me", which was previously released as a single by Canadian singer Patricia Conroy from her 1992 album Bad Day for Trains. McBride's version was a number 2 hit on the Hot Country Songs. Also released as singles from this album were "Life #9" at number 6, "Independence Day" at number 12, "Heart Trouble" at number 21, and "Where I Used to Have a Heart" at number 49.

== Content ==
Although never released as a single, "Strangers" was reprised on McBride's Greatest Hits album in 2001. In the liner notes of that album, she stated that she included the song because it was a fan favorite, and she felt that it would have been a better follow-up to "Independence Day" than "Heart Trouble" and "Where I Used to Have a Heart" were.

The Compact Cassette version of this album omits the final track, "Ashes".

== Track listing ==
No.	Title	Writer(s)	Length
1.	"Heart Trouble"	Paul Kennerley	3:19
2.	"My Baby Loves Me"	Gretchen Peters	2:36
3.	"That Wasn't Me"	Gary Harrison; Tim Mensy	3:44
4.	"Independence Day"	Peters	3:25
5.	"Where I Used to Have a Heart"	Craig Bickhardt	3:50
6.	"Goin' to Work"	Bill Lloyd; Pam Tillis	3:30
7.	"She Ain't Seen Nothing Yet"	Walt Aldridge; Anna Lisa Graham	3:26
8.	"Life #9"	Kostas; Tony Perez	3:59
9.	"Strangers"	Bobby Braddock	3:21
10.	"Ashes"	Chris Waters; Lonnie Wilson; Charlotte Wilson	2:55
Total length:			34:05

International bonus tracks
No.	Title	Writer(s)	Length
11.	"The Time Has Come"	Lonnie Wilson; Susan Longacre	2:32
12.	"That's Me"	Tony Haselden; Bob Alan	3:52
13.	"Cheap Whiskey"	Emory Gordy Jr.; Jim Rushing	3:08
14.	"When You Are Old"	Gretchen Peters	3:07

== Personnel ==
Compiled from liner notes.

Musicians

- Grace Mihi Bahng – cello (3)
- Brett Beavers – backing vocals (6 & 10)
- Joe Chemay – bass guitar
- Ashley Cleveland – backing vocals (4)
- Deryl Dodd – backing vocals (6 & 10)
- Dan Dugmore – electric guitar (2)
- Larry Franklin – fiddle (1, 8 & 10)
- Paul Franklin – pedal steel guitar (4 & 8)
- Johnny Garcia – electric guitar (1)
- Vicki Hampton – backing vocals (4)
- Dann Huff – electric guitar (2, 6 & 7)
- Bill Hullett – acoustic guitar (1, 3–5 & 8–10)
- Mary Ann Kennedy – backing vocals (2, 4 & 7)
- Martina McBride – lead vocals, backing vocals (2, 4, & 7–9), tambourine (6)
- Anthony S. Martin – backing vocals (8), keyboards (9)
- Brent Mason – electric guitar (1, 3–5 & 8–10)
- Steve Nathan – keyboards (except 9)
- Mary Kathryn Van Osdale – violin (3)
- Herb Pedersen – backing vocals (5)
- Pam Rose – backing vocals (2, 4 & 7)
- John Wesley Ryles – backing vocals (1, 8 & 9)
- Biff Watson – acoustic guitar (1 & 5–7)
- Charlie Whitten – pedal steel guitar (6, 7, 9 & 10)
- Kris Wilkinson – viola (3)
- Dennis Wilson – backing vocals (1, 8 & 9)
- Lonnie Wilson – drums
- Paul Worley – electric guitar (1, 2, 6 & 7), acoustic guitar

Production

- Don Cobb – digital editor
- Carlos Grier – digital editor
- Martina McBride – producer
- Anthony S. Martin – assistant producer
- Mike Poole – recording engineer
- Denny Purcell – mastering engineer
- Clarke Schleicher – recording engineer
- Ed Seay – production, recording engineer
- Paul Worley – producer

== Charts ==
=== Weekly charts ===
Chart (1993–1994)	Peak position
Canadian Country Albums (RPM)	8
US Billboard 200	106
US Top Country Albums (Billboard)	14

=== Year-end charts ===
Chart (1994)	Position
US Top Country Albums (Billboard)	46
Chart (1995)	Position
US Top Country Albums (Billboard)	55

=== Singles ===
Year	Single	Peak positions		Certifications
Year	Single	US Country	CAN Country	Certifications
1993	"My Baby Loves Me"	2	1	
1994	"Life #9"	6	8	
1994	"Independence Day"	12	14	* RIAA: Platinum
1994	"Heart Trouble"	21	32	
1995	"Where I Used to Have a Heart"	49	—	

== Certifications ==
Region	Certification	Certified units/sales
Canada (Music Canada)	Platinum	100,000^{^}
United States (RIAA)	Platinum	1,000,000^{^}
^{^} Shipments figures based on certification alone.
