= Thinkin' About You =

Studio album by Trisha Yearwood
- Released: February 14, 1995
- Recorded: 1994
- Studios: Sound Emporium (Nashville, Tennessee)
- Genre: Country
- Length: 34:52
- Label: MCA Nashville
- Producers: Garth Fundis (all tracks); Harry Stinson (track 2)

Trisha Yearwood chronology
The Sweetest Gift (1994)	Thinkin' About You (1995)	Everybody Knows (1996)

Singles from Thinkin' About You
- 1. "XXX's and OOO's (An American Girl)" Released: June 28, 1994; 2. "Thinkin' About You" Released: January 3, 1995; 3. "You Can Sleep While I Drive" Released: April 29, 1995; 4. "I Wanna Go Too Far" Released: July 31, 1995; 5. "On a Bus to St. Cloud" Released: November 1995

Thinkin' About You is the fifth studio album by American country music singer Trisha Yearwood. The album reached #3 on the Billboard country albums chart.

This album produced back-to-back Number One hits for Yearwood on the Billboard country charts in "XXX's and OOO's (An American Girl)" and "Thinkin' About You". Following these songs were "You Can Sleep While I Drive" (#23), "I Wanna Go Too Far" (#9), and "On a Bus to St. Cloud" (#59). "On a Bus to St. Cloud" was also the first single of Yearwood's career to miss Top 40 on the country charts. It was nominated for Best Country Album at the 38th Grammy Awards.

== Critical reception ==
Professional ratings
Review scores
Source	Rating
AllMusic	3/5 stars
Chicago Tribune	2.5/4 stars
Robert Christgau	(choice cut)
Entertainment Weekly	B+
Los Angeles Times	3/4 stars
Rolling Stone	4/5 stars

AllMusic gave the album a mediocre review, calling the arrangements "too slick," and noting that it was one of Yearwood's few albums that could be considered a disappointment.

== Track listing ==
1. "Thinkin' About You" (Bob Regan, Tom Shapiro) – 3:23
2. "XXX's and OOO's (An American Girl)" (Matraca Berg, Alice Randall) – 2:47
3. "You Can Sleep While I Drive" (Melissa Etheridge) – 3:15
4. "The Restless Kind" (Mike Henderson) – 3:27
5. "On a Bus to St. Cloud" (Gretchen Peters) – 4:43
6. "Fairytale" (Tony Arata) – 3:35
7. "Those Words We Said" (Angelo Petraglia, Kim Richey) – 3:03
8. "O Mexico" (Michael Joyce, Irene Kelley) – 3:36
9. "I Wanna Go Too Far" (Layng Martine Jr., Kent Robbins) – 2:59
10. "Till I Get It Right" (Larry Henley, Red Lane) – 4:04

=== International track listing ===
1. "Thinkin' About You" (Bob Regan, Tom Shapiro) – 3:23
2. "XXX's and OOO's (An American Girl)" (Matraca Berg, Alice Randall) – 2:47
3. "You Can Sleep While I Drive" (Melissa Etheridge) – 3:15
4. "The Restless Kind" (Mike Henderson) – 3:27
5. "Two Days from Knowing" (Gillian Welch, Matt Rollings) – 3:43
6. "On a Bus to St. Cloud" (Gretchen Peters) – 4:43
7. "Fairytale" (Tony Arata) – 3:35
8. "Those Words We Said" (Angelo Petraglia, Kim Richey) – 3:03
9. "O Mexico" (Michael Joyce, Irene Kelley) – 3:36
10. "Jackie's House" (Chapin Hartford) – 4:19
11. "I Wanna Go Too Far" (Layng Martine, Jr., Kent Robbins) – 2:59
12. "Bartender Blues" (James Taylor) – 3:51
  - duet with George Jones
13. "Till I Get It Right" (Larry Henley, Red Lane) – 4:04
14. "Save The Land" – 3:50 [Australian Version Bonus Track]

== Personnel ==
- Trisha Yearwood – lead vocals, backing vocals (3)
- Matt Rollings – acoustic piano (1, 3, 5, 6, 7, 10, 11, 13), organ (1, 8, 9)
- Steve Nathan – organ (2, 3, 4), keyboards (3, 10)
- Billy Joe Walker Jr. – acoustic guitar (1, 2, 3, 5–11, 13)
- Bobby All – acoustic guitar (4)
- Jon Randall – acoustic guitar (5, 8)
- Brian Ahern – acoustic guitar (12)
- Brent Mason – electric guitar (1–11, 13)
- Lee Roy Parnell – electric slide guitar (1, 3, 11)
- Mike Henderson – electric guitar (4)
- Billy Sanford – electric guitar (5), acoustic guitar (13), "tremolo" electric guitar (13)
- Paul Franklin – steel guitar (1–8, 10, 11, 13)
- Jerry Douglas – dobro (9)
- Sam Bush – mandolin (9)
- Marty Stuart – mandolin (12)
- Dave Pomeroy – bass guitar (1–11, 13)
- Glenn Worf – acoustic bass (12)
- Eddie Bayers – drums
- Tom Roady – congas (1, 7), tambourine (1, 8, 11), bongos (7)
- Aubrey Haynie – fiddle (1, 3–11, 13)
- Rob Hajacos – fiddle (2)
- Ricky Skaggs – fiddle (12)
- Kirk "Jelly Roll" Johnson – harmonica (3, 7, 10)
- Mark Watters – string arrangements and conductor (6, 10, 13)
- Carl Gorodetzky – string contractor (6, 10, 13)
- The Nashville String Machine – strings (6, 10, 13)
- Chuck Cannon – backing vocals (1)
- Lari White – backing vocals (1)
- Kim Richey – backing vocals (2)
- Harry Stinson – backing vocals (2, 4)
- Gretchen Peters – backing vocals (6)
- Mac McAnally – backing vocals (7, 11), acoustic guitar (12)
- Andrea Zonn – backing vocals (7, 11)
- Raul Malo – backing vocals (8)
- Mary Chapin Carpenter – backing vocals (9)
- Pam Tillis – backing vocals (10)
- George Jones – lead vocals (12)

== Production ==
- Garth Fundis – producer (1–11, 13)
- Harry Stinson – co-producer (2)
- Brian Ahern – producer (12)
- Dave Sinko – engineer
- Ken Hutton – assistant engineer
- Chuck Ainlay – mixing
- Amy Hughes – mix assistant
- Graham Lewis – mix assistant
- Carlos Grier – digital editing
- Denny Purcell – mastering
- Georgetown Masters (Nashville, Tennessee) – mastering location
- Scott Paschall – production assistant
- Beth Middleworth – art direction, design
- Russ Harrington – photography

== Charts ==
=== Weekly charts ===
Chart (1995)	Peak position
Australian Albums (ARIA)	189
Canadian Albums (RPM)	71
Canadian Country Albums (RPM)	18
US Billboard 200	28
US Top Country Albums (Billboard)	3
UK Country Albums (Official Charts)	2

=== Year-end charts ===
Chart (1995)	Position
US Top Country Albums (Billboard)	29

=== Singles ===
Year	Single	Peak chart positions		
Year	Single	US Country	US	CAN Country
1994	"XXX's and OOO's (An American Girl)"	1	114	1
1995	"Thinkin' About You"	1	120	4
1995	"You Can Sleep While I Drive"	23	—	26
1995	"I Wanna Go Too Far"	9	—	25
1996	"On a Bus to St. Cloud"	59	—	27

== Certifications ==
Region	Certification	Certified units/sales
United States (RIAA)	Platinum	1,000,000^{^}
^{^} Shipments figures based on certification alone.
