= The Time Has Come (Martina McBride album) =

Studio album by Martina McBride
- Released: May 12, 1992
- Studio: Javelina (Nashville, Tennessee); The Money Pit (Nashville, Tennessee)
- Genre: Neotraditional country; honky-tonk; country-folk
- Length: 31:52
- Label: RCA Nashville
- Producer: Ed Seay; Paul Worley

Martina McBride chronology
The Time Has Come (1992)	The Way That I Am (1993)

Singles from The Time Has Come
- 1. "The Time Has Come" Released: May 1992; 2. "That's Me" Released: July 1992; 3. "Cheap Whiskey" Released: December 1992

Professional ratings
Review scores
Source	Rating
AllMusic	4/5 stars
Chicago Tribune	3.5/4 stars
Entertainment Weekly	B
Los Angeles Times	2.5/4 stars

The Time Has Come is the debut studio album by American country music artist Martina McBride, released on May 5, 1992, by RCA Records Nashville. The album rose to the No. 49 position on the Billboard Top Country Albums chart. It includes the singles "The Time Has Come", "Cheap Whiskey" and "That's Me", all of which charted on the Billboard country charts. "The Time Has Come" was the highest-peaking of the three, reaching #23. "When You Are Old" was later recorded by Gretchen Peters on her 1996 album The Secret of Life.

== Track listing ==
No.	Title	Writer(s)	Length
1.	"The Time Has Come"	Lonnie Wilson; Susan Longacre	2:32
2.	"That's Me"	Tony Haselden; Bob Alan	3:52
3.	"True Blue Fool"	Carol Chase; Kathy Louvin	2:58
4.	"Losing You Feels Good"	L. Wilson; Charlotte Wilson; Herbert Wilson	3:20
5.	"Walk That Line"	David Wills; Rick West	2:49
6.	"Cheap Whiskey"	Emory Gordy Jr.; Jim Rushing	3:08
7.	"I Can't Sleep"	Louvin; Mark Collie	2:46
8.	"A Woman Knows"	Chris McCarty; Allen Spears; John Fowler	3:17
9.	"The Rope"	Stephanie Davis	3:58
10.	"When You Are Old"	Gretchen Peters	3:07
Total length:			31:52

== Personnel ==
Credits adapted from album liner notes.

Vocals

- Garth Brooks – backing vocals (6)
- Carol Chase – backing vocals (5, 8)
- Kathy Chiavola – backing vocals (9)
- Carl Jackson – backing vocals (9)
- Wendy Johnson – backing vocals (5, 8)
- Anthony Martin – backing vocals (3, 9)
- Martina McBride – lead vocals, backing vocals (2, 3, 6, 7)
- Harry Stinson – backing vocals (1, 3, 4)
- Dennis Wilson – backing vocals (1, 3, 4)
- Carrie Young – backing vocals (7)
- Andrea Zonn – backing vocals (2)

Musicians

- Larry Byrom – electric guitar (5)
- Mike Chapman – bass guitar (1, 2, 4, 6, 7, 8)
- Joe Chemay – bass guitar (5, 10)
- Conni Ellisor – string conductor (2, 10)
- Sonny Garrish – pedal steel guitar (3, 9, 10), pedabro (9)
- Rob Hajacos – fiddle (4–7)
- John Hobbs – piano (2, 4, 6, 7, 9)
- John Hughey – steel guitar (2, 4, 6, 7, 8)
- Bill Hulett – acoustic guitar (3, 9)
- Paul Leim – drums (5, 10)
- Anthony Martin – organ (2), synthesizers (4), keyboards (9)
- Brent Mason – electric guitar (1–4, 6–9)
- Steve Nathan – acoustic piano (5, 10)
- Ed Seay – bass (8)
- Biff Watson – mandolin (1), acoustic guitar (2, 4, 5, 6, 8, 10), electric guitar (9)
- Bergen White – string arrangements (2, 10)
- Lonnie Wilson – drums (1–4, 6–9)
- Paul Worley – acoustic guitar
- Glenn Worf – bass guitar (3, 9)
- Andrea Zonn – fiddle (9)
- The "A" Strings – string section (2, 10)

Production

- Jeff Giedt – recording assistant, mix assistant
- Carlos Grier – digital editing
- Anthony Martin – associate producer, additional recording, engineer, recording, mix assistant
- Denny Purcell – mastering engineer
- Clarke Schleicher – additional recording
- Ed Seay – producer, recording and mixing engineer
- D. Bergan White – director
- Paul Worley – producer

== Chart performance ==
=== Album ===
Chart (1992)	Peak position
U.S. Billboard Top Country Albums	49
U.S. Billboard Top Heatseekers	15
Canadian RPM Country Albums	21

=== Singles ===
Year	Single	Peak positions	
Year	Single	US Country	CAN Country
1992	"The Time Has Come"	23	11
1992	"That's Me"	43	44
1992	"Cheap Whiskey"	44	47
