= The Secret of Life (album) =

Studio album by Gretchen Peters
- Released: 1996
- Recorded: 1995–1996
- Genre: Country, folk
- Length: 42:12
- Label: Imprint
- Producer: Green Daniel

Gretchen Peters chronology
The Secret of Life (1996)	Gretchen Peters (2001)

The Secret of Life is the debut studio album by American singer-songwriter Gretchen Peters. It was released in 1996, and featured a minor hit single in the track, "When You Are Old". The song reached number 68 on the Hot Country Songs chart. The album was the first release for Imprint Records.

Faith Hill covered the title track and took it to number 4 on the country chart in the States (while also scraping into the top 50 on the Billboard Hot 100). Trisha Yearwood recorded her own version of "On a Bus to St. Cloud" for her full-length Thinkin' About You (two years prior to the release of this album), while Martina McBride has recorded 3 songs: "This Uncivil War", "When You Are Old" and "Independence Day" which she took to number 12 on the U.S. country chart.

== Reception ==
Professional ratings
Review scores
Source	Rating
AllMusic	3/5 stars

AllMusic gave the album three stars (out of a possible five), comparing her to fellow singer-songwriter Mary Chapin Carpenter, calling the songs "highly introspective, thoughtful and intelligent". An uncredited review in Billboard said that Peters "proves to be as satisfying a singer as she is a writer."

== Track listing ==
All tracks are written by Gretchen Peters except where noted

No.	Title	Writer(s)	Length
1.	"Waiting For the Light to Turn Green"	Peters, Suzy Bogguss	3:42
2.	"Border Town"		4:07
3.	"I Ain't Ever Satisfied"	Steve Earle	3:50
4.	"I Was Looking For You"		3:58
5.	"On a Bus to St. Cloud"		3:55
6.	"Over Africa"		4:10
7.	"This Uncivil War"		4:08
8.	"The Secret of Life"		4:16
9.	"A Room With a View"		3:39
10.	"Circus Girl"		3:34
11.	"When You Are Old"		2:53
12.	"Independence Day"		3:44

== Personnel ==
- Gretchen Peters – vocals, acoustic guitar, Dobro
- Chris Leuzinger, Michael Severs – guitars
- Dan Dugmore – lap and pedal steel guitars
- Bruce Bouton – pedal steel
- Steve Conn – accordion
- Daniel Green – keyboards, organ, percussion
- Barry Walsh – keyboards, Hammond organ, piano, melodica
- Phil Kenzie – soprano saxophone
- Dave Pomeroy – electric and acoustic bass
- Brian Barnett, Tommy Wells – drums, percussion
- Nashville String Machine – strings; arranged and conducted by Connie Elisor
- Steve Earle, Emmylou Harris, James House, Raul Malo, Harry Stinson, Billy Thomas – backing vocals and harmony

== Production ==
- Produced By Daniel Green
- Engineered By Tom Hitchcock, Steve Marcantonio & Mike Psanos; assisted by Marc Frigo, Mike Purcell, Daryl Roudbush, Ed Simonton & John Thomas II
- Mixed By Steve Marcantonio
- Digital Editing By Don Cobb
- Mastered By Denny Purcell
