= Heart Trouble =

Heart Trouble may refer to:

- Heart Trouble (film), a 1928 American silent comedy
- Heart Trouble (album), by Wanda Jackson, 2003
- "Heart Trouble" (Martina McBride song), 1994
- "Heart Trouble" (Steve Wariner song), 1985
- "Heart Trouble", a song by the Parliaments
