= XXX's and OOO's (An American Girl) =

Single by Trisha Yearwood

from the album Thinkin' About You
- B-side: "One in a Row"
- Released: June 28, 1994
- Studio: Sound Emporium (Nashville, Tennessee)
- Genre: Country
- Length: 2:49
- Label: MCA
- Songwriters: Matraca Berg, Alice Randall
- Producers: Garth Fundis, Harry Stinson

Trisha Yearwood singles chronology
"Better Your Heart Than Mine" (1994)	"XXX's and OOO's (An American Girl)" (1994)	"Thinkin' About You" (1995)

"XXX's and OOO's (An American Girl)" is a song written by Matraca Berg and Alice Randall, and recorded by American country music singer Trisha Yearwood. It was released in June 1994 as the lead single from her album Thinkin' About You. The song became her second number-one hit on the US country chart and her first since "She's in Love with the Boy" in 1991. The single also peaked at number 14 on the Bubbling Under Hot 100 chart and number one on the Canadian Country singles chart. It is the theme song to her Food Network show Trisha's Southern Kitchen.

In co-writing the song with Berg, Alice Randall became the second African-American woman to write a number-one country hit.

== Content ==
The song tells the story of a young woman who has huge dreams and ambitions, but also discusses how she works hard and is a simple American girl who "signs her letters with XXX's and OOO's". She dreams of becoming successful in a man's world, citing her father as an example. The chorus verifies how the woman is a simple American girl. In the song, there are references to R&B/soul singer Aretha Franklin and country singer Patsy Cline. The song was also the theme to a television pilot titled XXX's and OOO's, which was pitched to CBS in late 1994.

== Personnel ==
All credits are adapted from the liner notes of Thinkin' About You.

- Eddie Bayers – drums
- Paul Franklin – steel guitar
- Rob Hajacos – fiddle
- Brent Mason – electric guitar
- Steve Nathan – organ
- Dave Pomeroy – bass guitar
- Kim Richey – backing vocals
- Harry Stinson – backing vocals
- Billy Joe Walker Jr. – acoustic guitar

== Critical reception ==
Deborah Evans Price, of Billboard magazine reviewed the song unfavorably, saying that the song is obviously supposed to mean something, "with its rapid-fire scheme and assertive-woman references." She goes on to say that the song ends up "sounding like exactly what it is - the theme to a bad television show."

== Charts ==
"XXX's and OOO's (An American Girl)" debuted at number 73 on the U.S. Billboard Hot Country Singles & Tracks chart for the week of July 9, 1994.

Chart (1994)	Peak position
Canada Country Singles (RPM)	1
US Bubbling Under Hot 100 (Billboard)	14
US Hot Country Songs (Billboard)	1

=== Year-end charts ===
Chart (1994)	Position
Canada Country Tracks (RPM)	70
US Country Songs (Billboard)	6

== Certifications ==
Region	Certification	Certified units/sales
United States (RIAA)	Gold	500,000^{‡}
^{‡} Sales+streaming figures based on certification alone.
