= My Baby Loves Me (Just the Way That I Am) =

1992 single by Patricia Conroy

Single by Patricia Conroy

from the album Bad Day for Trains
- Released: May 1992
- Genre: Country
- Length: 2:40
- Label: Warner Music Canada
- Songwriter: Gretchen Peters
- Producers: Pat McMakin; Randall Prescott

Patricia Conroy singles chronology
"Why I'm Walkin'" (1991)	"My Baby Loves Me (Just the Way That I Am)" (1992)	"Bad Day for Trains" (1992)

"My Baby Loves Me (Just the Way That I Am)" is a song written by American singer-songwriter Gretchen Peters and was first recorded by Canadian country music singer Patricia Conroy on her second studio album, Bad Day for Trains (1992). Her version was released in May 1992 as the first single from her album and peaked at number eight on the Canadian RPM Country Tracks.

== Martina McBride version ==
"My Baby Loves Me"

Single by Martina McBride

from the album The Way That I Am
- B-side: "A Woman Knows"
- Released: July 12, 1993
- Genre: Country
- Length: 2:36
- Label: RCA Nashville
- Songwriter: Gretchen Peters
- Producers: Paul Worley; Ed Seay; Martina McBride

Martina McBride singles chronology
"Cheap Whiskey" (1993)	"My Baby Loves Me" (1993)	"Life #9" (1994)

American country music artist Martina McBride would the song in 1993 and re-titled it to simply "My Baby Loves Me". Her rendition was released on July 12, 1993 as the lead single and pseudo-title track from her second studio album The Way That I Am (1993). McBride's version became her breakthrough hit, topping the Canadian country chart while peaking at number two on the US country singles chart.

McBride's version includes slide guitar and six-string bass riffs from Paul Worley, who criticized his own performance on them and said that they "somehow never got erased".

=== Personnel ===
- Joe Chemay – bass guitar
- Biff Watson – acoustic guitar
- Dan Dugmore – electric guitar
- Dann Huff – electric guitar
- Mary Ann Kennedy – backing vocals
- Martina McBride – lead and backing vocals
- Steve Nathan – keyboards
- Pam Rose – backing vocals
- Lonnie Wilson – drums
- Paul Worley – electric and acoustic guitars

=== Music video ===
A music video was filmed for this version of the song. It was directed by Steven Goldmann.

=== Commercial performance ===
McBride's rendition of "My Baby Loves Me" debuted at number 67 on the US Billboard Hot Country Singles & Tracks chart the week of July 31, 1993. The track would go on to enter the top ten at number eight the week of November 20, 1993, becoming her first top ten hit. On December 4, 1993, the song would peak at number two on the chart behind Garth Brooks's single "American Honky-Tonk Bar Association". According to producer Paul Worley, had the song been played just three more times, it would have gone number one. "My Baby Loves Me" would top the Canadian RPM Country Tracks chart the week of December 18, 1993, coincidentally blocking "American Honky-Tonk Association" from the number one spot. It also became McBride's first number one single in the country, and her last until "Still Holding On" in 1997.

== Charts ==
=== Patricia Conroy ===
Chart (1992)	Peak position
Canada Country Singles (RPM)	8

==== Year-end charts ====
Chart (1992)	Position
Canada Country Tracks (RPM)	90

=== Martina McBride ===
Chart (1993)	Peak position
Canada Country Singles (RPM)	1
US Hot Country Songs (Billboard)	2

==== Year-end charts ====
Chart (1993)	Position
Canada Country Tracks (RPM)	55
Chart (1994)	Position
Canada Country Tracks (RPM)	20
