= What Else Can I Do =

Single by Patricia Conroy

from the album You Can't Resist
- Released: 1995 (Canada); 1996 (US)
- Recorded: 1994
- Genre: Country
- Length: 4:15
- Label: Warner Music Canada (Canada); Intersound Records (US)
- Songwriters: Tony Arata, Scott Miller
- Producers: Mike Wanchic, Justin Niebank

Patricia Conroy singles chronology
"Somebody's Leavin'" (1994)	"What Else Can I Do" (1995)	"You Can't Resist It" (1995)

United States singles chronology
"Keep Me Rockin'" (1996)	"What Else Can I Do" (1996)

"What Else Can I Do" is the title of a country music song written by Tony Arata and Scott Miller. It was recorded by Patricia Conroy on her 1994 album You Can't Resist. In Canada, the song was released in 1995 by Warner Music Canada as the album's second single. In the United States, the song was released in 1996 by Intersound Records also as the album second single, but failed to chart on the Billboard Hot Country Singles & Tracks chart. The song became a Number One on the Canadian RPM Country Tracks in 1995.

== Chart performance ==
The song debuted at number 64 on the Canadian RPM Country Tracks on the chart dated February 6, 1995 and spent 11 weeks on the chart before peaking at number 1 on April 17.

Chart (1995)	Peak position
Canada Country Singles (RPM)	1

=== Year-end charts ===
Chart (1995)	Position
Canada Country Tracks (RPM)	13
