= Thinkin' About You (Trisha Yearwood song) =

Single by Trisha Yearwood

from the album Thinkin' About You
- B-side: "Fairytale"
- Released: January 3, 1995
- Studio: Sound Emporium (Nashville, Tennessee)
- Genre: Country
- Length: 3:23
- Label: MCA Nashville
- Songwriters: Tom Shapiro, Bob Regan
- Producer: Garth Fundis

Trisha Yearwood singles chronology
"XXX's and OOO's (An American Girl)" (1994)	"Thinkin' About You" (1995)	"You Can Sleep While I Drive" (1995)

"Thinkin' About You" is a song written by Tom Shapiro and Bob Regan, and recorded by American country music artist Trisha Yearwood. It was released in January 1995 as the second single and title track from her album Thinkin' About You. The song became Yearwood's third number-one country hit in April 1995. Lee Roy Parnell plays slide guitar on the song.

== Critical reception ==
Billboard gave the single a favorable review, praising Yearwood's vocal delivery and Parnell's guitar work, and overall saying that it was "a cut above" her previous singles.

== Personnel ==
All credits are adapted from the liner notes of Thinkin' About You.

- Eddie Bayers – drums
- Chuck Cannon – backing vocals
- Paul Franklin – steel guitar
- Aubrey Haynie – fiddle
- Brent Mason – electric guitar
- Lee Roy Parnell – electric slide guitar
- Dave Pomeroy – bass guitar
- Tom Roady – congas, tambourine
- Matt Rollings – organ, piano
- Billy Joe Walker Jr. – acoustic guitar
- Lari White – backing vocals

== Music video ==
The music video was directed by Gerry Wenner and premiered in early 1995.

== Chart performance ==
Chart (1995)	Peak position
Canada Country Singles (RPM)	4
US Bubbling Under Hot 100 (Billboard)	20
US Hot Country Songs (Billboard)	1

=== Year-end charts ===
Chart (1995)	Position
Canada Country Tracks (RPM)	94
US Country Songs (Billboard)	6
