= This Time (Patricia Conroy song) =

Single by Patricia Conroy

from the album Blue Angel
- Released: 1990
- Genre: Country
- Length: 3:33
- Label: WEA

Patricia Conroy singles chronology
"A Thousand Rails" (1990)	"This Time" (1990)	"Take Me with You" (1991)

"This Time" is a song recorded by Canadian country music artist Patricia Conroy. It was released in 1990 as the first single from her debut album, Blue Angel. It peaked at number 10 on the RPM Country Tracks chart in December 1990.

== Chart performance ==
Chart (1990)	Peak position
Canada Country Singles (RPM)	10
