= Blue Angel (Patricia Conroy album) =

Studio album by Patricia Conroy
- Released: 1990
- Recorded: May 1990
- Studio: Phase One Studios
- Genre: Country
- Length: 32:09
- Label: Warner Music Canada
- Producer: Randall Prescott

Patricia Conroy chronology
Blue Angel (1990)	Bad Day for Trains (1992)

Blue Angel is the debut album by Canadian country music singer-songwriter Patricia Conroy, and was released in 1990 by Warner Music Canada.

The album was rated two out of five stars by the Winnipeg Sun.

== Track listing ==
1. "This Time" - 3:33
2. "Blue Angel" - 3:35
3. "How Many Horses" - 3:14
4. "Disappointed by You" - 2:10
5. "Over and Done" - 3:58
6. "Why I'm Walkin'" - 2:23
7. "Piece by Piece" - 2:46
8. "Take Me with You" - 3:35
9. "Don't Come to Me" - 3:02
10. "Walk Away" - 3:45
