= You Can Sleep While I Drive =

1990 single by Melissa Etheridge

Single by Melissa Etheridge

from the album Brave and Crazy
- B-side: "You Can Sleep While I Drive" (live); "The Late September Dogs" (live)
- Released: 1990
- Genre: Pop rock
- Length: 3:14
- Label: Island
- Songwriter: Melissa Etheridge
- Producers: Kevin McCormick; Niko Bolas; Melissa Etheridge

Melissa Etheridge singles chronology
"Let Me Go" (1989)	"You Can Sleep While I Drive" (1990)	"Ain't It Heavy" (1992)

"You Can Sleep While I Drive"

Single by Trisha Yearwood

from the album Thinkin' About You
- B-side: "Two Days from Knowing"
- Released: April 29, 1995
- Studio: Sound Emporium (Nashville, Tennessee)
- Genre: Country
- Length: 3:15
- Label: MCA
- Songwriter: Melissa Etheridge
- Producer: Garth Fundis

Trisha Yearwood singles chronology
"Thinkin' About You" (1995)	"You Can Sleep While I Drive" (1995)	"I Wanna Go Too Far" (1995)

Music video
- "You Can Sleep While I Drive" on YouTube

"You Can Sleep While I Drive" is a song recorded by American singer-songwriter Melissa Etheridge for her second album, Brave and Crazy (1989). American Country music artist Trisha Yearwood covered the song and released it in April 1995 by MCA Records as the third single from her fifth album, Thinkin' About You (1995). The song reached #23 on the US Billboard Hot Country Singles & Tracks chart.

== Critical reception ==
A reviewer from Music & Media wrote, "Trisha sings Melissa. Thanks to her wonderful interpretation of the Etheridge song you automatically envision long car rides at night in the rain, while your wipers set the pace to fall asleep to."

== Charts ==
Chart (1995)	Peak position
Canada Country Tracks (RPM)	26
US Hot Country Songs (Billboard)	23
