= Imprint Records =

American record label

- Founded: 1995
- Founder: Bud Schaetzle, Roy Wunsch
- Defunct: 1997
- Genre: Country
- Country of origin: U.S.
- Location: Nashville, Tennessee

Imprint Records, originally known as Veritas Music Entertainment, was an American record label established in July 1995 that specialized in country music. The label was disestablished in 1997.

== History ==
Roy Wunsch, a former CEO of Sony Music Nashville, founded the label in 1994 with Bud Schaetzle. Imprint was the first independent country record label to be listed as a publicly traded company on NASDAQ.

Its first release was Gretchen Peters' 1996 disc The Secret of Life. Peters, The GrooveGrass Boyz, Bob Woodruff and Jeff Wood charted singles for the label between 1996 and 1997, with the latter two also releasing albums. The GrooveGrass Boyz had the most commercially successful release for the label, selling more than 80,000 copies of a country version of "Macarena". Al Anderson of NRBQ and Canadian country singer Charlie Major also recorded one album each for the label.

In July 1997, label president Bud Schaetzle announced that the label's operations were put "on hold". He began a new company, Imprint Entertainment, which specialized in film and television production. At the time of the label's closure, The GrooveGrass Boyz, Wood, Woodruff, and Ryan Reynolds were the only acts on the roster. Reynolds was in the process of recording his debut album Rose City, which was never released. At the point of its closure, Imprint had made less than $200,000 in revenue, despite investing more than $1 million in the albums it had shipped.

== Artists ==
- Al Anderson
- The GrooveGrass Boyz
- Charlie Major
- Gretchen Peters
- Ryan Reynolds
- Jeff Wood
- Bob Woodruff

== See also ==
- List of record labels
