= On a Bus to St. Cloud =

Single by Trisha Yearwood

from the album Thinkin' About You
- B-side: "O Mexico"
- Released: November 1995
- Genre: Country; country pop
- Length: 3:51
- Label: MCA Nashville
- Songwriter: Gretchen Peters
- Producer: Garth Fundis

Trisha Yearwood singles chronology
"I Wanna Go Too Far" (1995)	"On a Bus to St. Cloud" (1995)	"Believe Me Baby (I Lied)" (1996)

"On a Bus to St. Cloud" is a song written by Gretchen Peters that was originally recorded by American country artist Trisha Yearwood. It was released in 1995 as the fifth (and final) single from her fourth studio album, Thinkin' About You. The song charted on the Billboard country songs survey that year and was received positively by music critics. Peters included her own version of the song on her 1996 debut album The Secret of Life, an acoustic version on her 2015 album Blackbirds and a live version on her 2022 album The Show.

== Background and content ==
In an interview with American Songwriter, Gretchen Peters explained her reasons for writing "On a Bus to St. Cloud." Peters explained that she had composed the song when planning a cross-country trip of the United States. Looking at a paper map, her eyes then "drifted north" towards the city of St. Cloud, Minnesota, and believed it to be a quality song title. The original demonstration tape was also performed by Peters. Two days later, it was brought to the attention of Trisha Yearwood from the demo's bass player, Dave Pomeroy. By the third day, it was formally recorded by Yearwood.

The song was recorded in 1994 at Sound Emporium Studios, located in Nashville, Tennessee. The session was produced by Garth Fundis, Yearwood's long-time record producer. Rick Moore of American Songwriter described the song as being about a person believes to see their former lover despite that they committed suicide.

== Critical reception ==
"On a Bus to St. Cloud" has received positive reviews from writers and music critics. Billboard magazine positively commented that the song had "vivid imagery in the lyric is brought to life by Yearwood's wistful vocals." Thom Owens of Allmusic made the song an "album pick" when reviewing her fourth studio album. Rick Moore of American Songwriter called the song "tear-jerking", further saying that it "once again showed why she was one of her generation’s premier singers." Paul Sexton of U Discover Music said that Yearwood's fans were "thrilled both to her sensitive delivery, to the tear-stained eloquence of the lyric and its gossamer melody."

== Release and music video ==
"On a Bus to St. Cloud" was released in November 1995 via MCA Nashville Records. It was issued as both a CD single and a vinyl single. Included on the single was a B-side, "O Mexico," which was later released on her fourth album. On December 2, 1995, the single debuted on the Billboard Hot Country Songs chart, but only reached a minor position on the chart. The single spent a total of eight weeks on the country chart and peaked at number 59 in January 1996. Rick Moore of American Songwriter later commented that "a lot of people thought was a bit of an injustice" for failing to become a major hit on country radio. It also peaked at number 27 on the Canadian RPM Country Songs chart.

"On a Bus to St. Cloud" was first released on Yearwood's fourth studio album entitled, Thinkin' About You. It was the fifth single released from the album and her first solo single in her career to miss the top 40 of the country chart. In 1995, a music video for the song was released that was directed by Gerry Wenner. The video was produced by Robin Beresford.

== Track listing ==
CD single

- "On a Bus to St. Cloud" – 3:51

7" vinyl single

- "On a Bus to St. Cloud" – 3:51
- "O Mexico" – 3:56

== Charts ==
Chart (1995–1996)	Peak position
Australia (ARIA)	138
Canada Country Songs (RPM)	27
US Hot Country Songs (Billboard)	59

== Personnel ==
All credits are adapted from the liner notes of Thinkin' About You.

- Carl Gorodetzky – contractor
- Aubrey Haynie – fiddle
- The Nashville String Machine – strings
- Matt Rollings – piano
- Mark Watters – conductor, arranger
- Trisha Yearwood – lead vocals
