= Somebody's Leavin' =

Single by Patricia Conroy

from the album You Can't Resist
- Released: 1994
- Genre: Country
- Length: 4:00
- Label: Warner Music Canada (CAN); 1-800-COUNTRY (US)
- Songwriters: Kostas; Matraca Berg
- Producers: Mike Wanchic; Justin Niebank

Patricia Conroy singles chronology
"Here We Go Again" (1993)	"Somebody's Leavin'" (1994)	"What Else Can I Do" (1995)

"Somebody's Leavin'" is a single by Canadian country music artist Patricia Conroy. Released in 1994, it was the first single from her album You Can't Resist. The song reached #1 on the RPM Country Tracks chart in December 1994.

== History ==
"Somebody's Leavin'" was Conroy's first single to be released in the United States. As her label Warner Music Canada did not show interest in releasing the song in that country, she instead secured a deal with the independent label 1-800-COUNTRY to distribute the song in the United States. However, the single failed to receive much notice in the United States. This was due to CMT boycotting videos by Canadian singers who were not signed to American record labels, as a response to the Canadian Radio-television and Telecommunications Commission eliminating the network from Canadian cable television services.

== Accolades ==
In 1995, the Canadian Country Music Association nominated the song for Video of the Year.

== Chart performance ==
Chart (1994)	Peak position
Canada Country Singles (RPM)	1
