= Allegany County Fairgrounds =

Fairground in Maryland, United States

Coordinates: 39°36′31″N 78°47′54″W

The Allegany County Fairgrounds is a complex located just west of Cumberland, Maryland along McMullen Highway. Throughout the year the fairground holds musical concerts, car races, and private events. Once annually the Allegany County Fair and AgExpo, customarily in the middle of July. Another major event is DelFest, a 4-day bluegrass festival originated by Del McCoury, and held annually since 2008 over the Memorial Day weekend.
