= Del McCoury =

American bluegrass musician

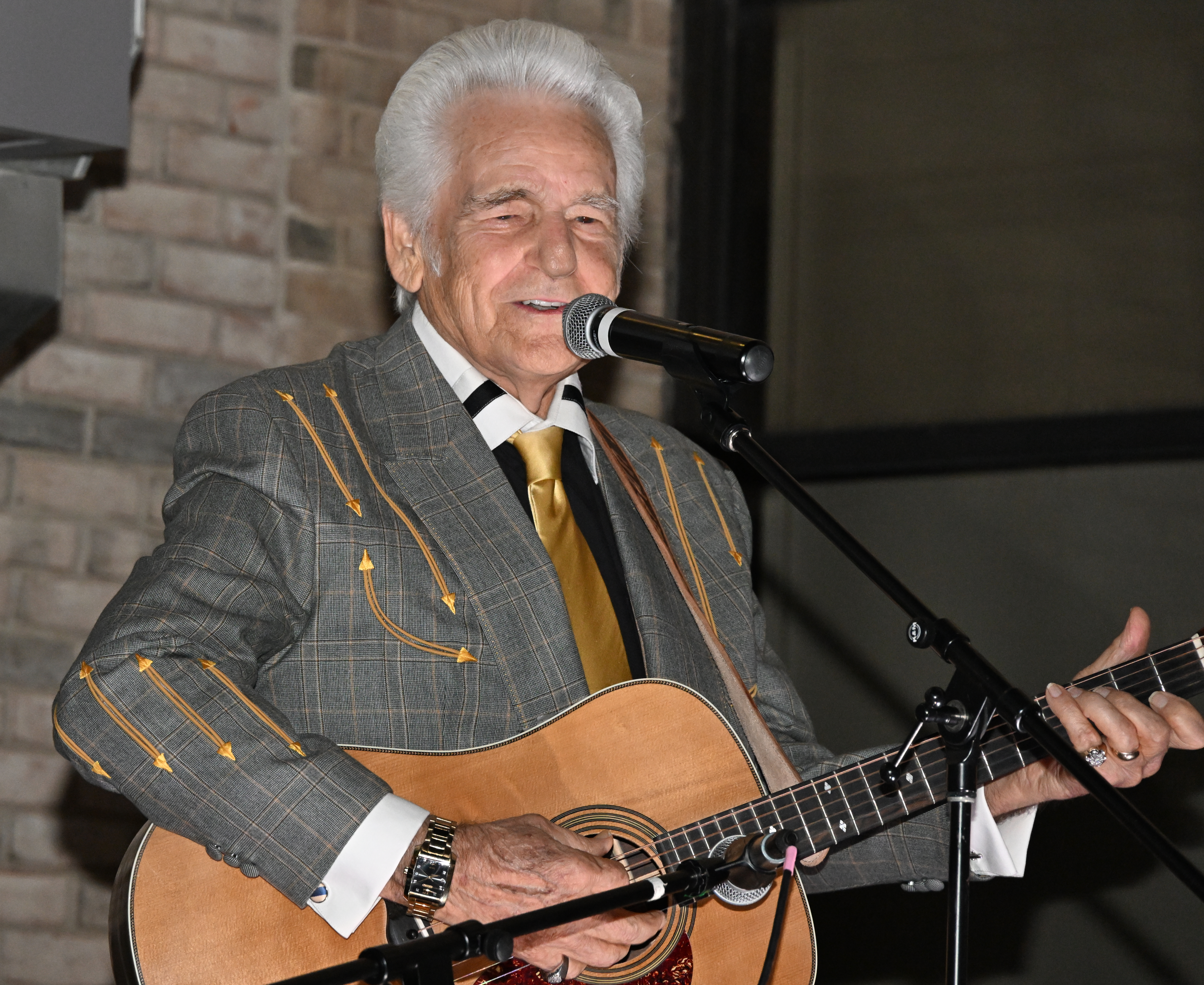
- McCoury in 2025

Background information
- Born: Delano Floyd McCoury; February 1, 1939 (age 87); Bakersville, North Carolina, U.S.
- Genres: Bluegrass; country; old-time
- Occupations: Singer, musician
- Instruments: Vocals, guitar, banjo
- Years active: 1958–present
- Labels: Rounder Records, McCoury Music
- Member of: Del McCoury Band
- Formerly of: The GrooveGrass Boyz
- Website: www.delmccouryband.com

Delano Floyd McCoury (born February 1, 1939) is an American bluegrass musician. As leader of the Del McCoury Band, he plays guitar and sings lead vocals along with his two sons, Ronnie McCoury and Rob McCoury, who play mandolin and banjo respectively. He became a member of the Grand Ole Opry in 2003. In June 2010, he received a National Heritage Fellowship lifetime achievement award from the National Endowment for the Arts and in 2011 he was elected into the International Bluegrass Music Hall of Fame.

== Early life and career ==
McCoury was born in Bakersville, North Carolina. His mother, Hazel, sang and played several instruments. His brother Jerry plays bass. His brother G. C. taught Del to play the guitar and sparked his interest in bluegrass music. The McCoury family moved to York County, Pennsylvania in 1941.

Inspired by Earl Scruggs, McCoury learned to play the banjo. He purchased his first banjo, a Gibson, and joined a band called The Stevens Brothers. He later played with Keith Daniels and the Blue Ridge Ramblers. They recorded an album for the Empire label in 1962.

McCoury was drafted into the military that same year, but received a medical discharge. Del played with Marvin Howell and the Franklin County Boys and Jack Cooke and the Virginia Mountain Boys. He joined Bill Monroe's band The Blue Grass Boys in February 1963. They already had a banjo player, so McCoury played guitar and sang. During his tenure with the group they had several appearances at the Grand Ole Opry and recorded six songs for Decca Records.

McCoury left Monroe's band in February 1964. He played the Golden State Boys and the Shady Valley Boys in California, but returned home in June to work a day job doing logging with his father, while working weekend gigs in Maryland, Virginia, and Pennsylvania. In December 1967, he recorded his first album, Del McCoury Sings Bluegrass.

In the 1980s his sons began performing with him. Fiddler Tad Marks and bass player Mike Brantley joined McCoury's group in early 1990s. McCoury's group toured widely throughout the US. They relocated to Nashville, Tennessee as they began to attract attention. Fiddler Jason Carter and bassist Mike Bub joined in 1992. Alan Bartram joined the band as bassist in 2005. McCoury became a member of the Grand Ole Opry in October 2003.

McCoury was also one of many performers at The Clearwater Concert at Madison Square Garden on May 3, 2009. The event celebrated the 90th birthday of Pete Seeger.

McCoury has influenced a great number of bands, including Phish, with whom he has shared the stage several times, and who have covered his songs. He has also performed with The String Cheese Incident and Donna the Buffalo, and recorded with Steve Earle. McCoury has covered songs by artists as diverse as The Lovin' Spoonful, Tom Petty, and Richard Thompson. McCoury has appeared at festivals including Bonnaroo, High Sierra, the Hardly Strictly Bluegrass, The Telluride Bluegrass Festival, and the Newport Folk Festival. His television appearances include Late Night with Conan O'Brien and the Late Show with David Letterman. Del has a very enthusiastic fan base, known as the Del-Heads.

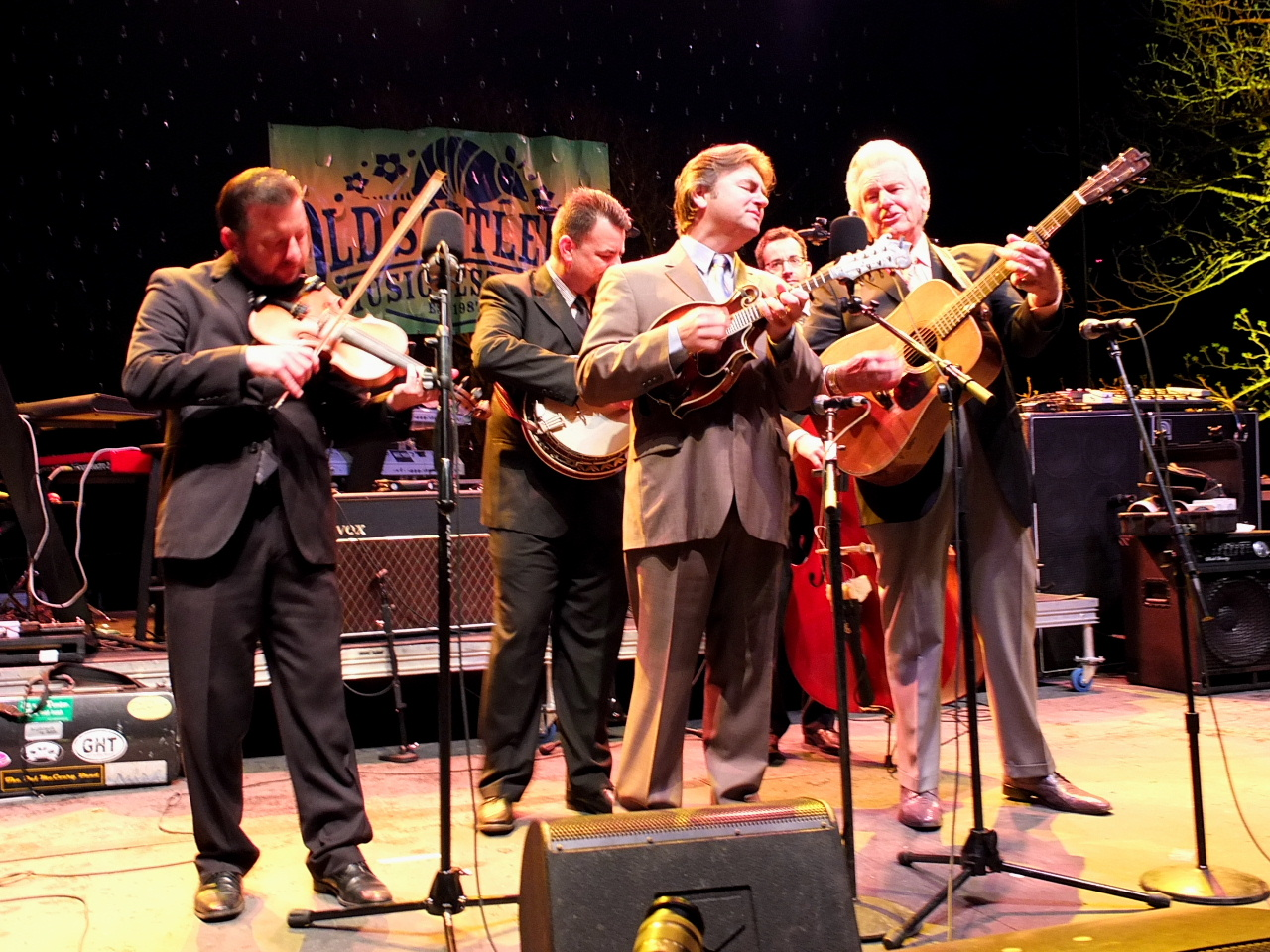
Del McCoury Band – Old Settler's Music Festival (2013)

In October 2009, The Del McCoury Band began offering fans recordings of their performances on USB flash drives available immediately after their concerts.

In June 2010, McCoury received a lifetime achievement award from the National Endowment for the Arts in the field of folk and traditional arts, including a stipend of $25,000.

In 2012, he joined the 11th annual Independent Music Awards judging panel to assist independent musicians' careers.

== DelFest ==
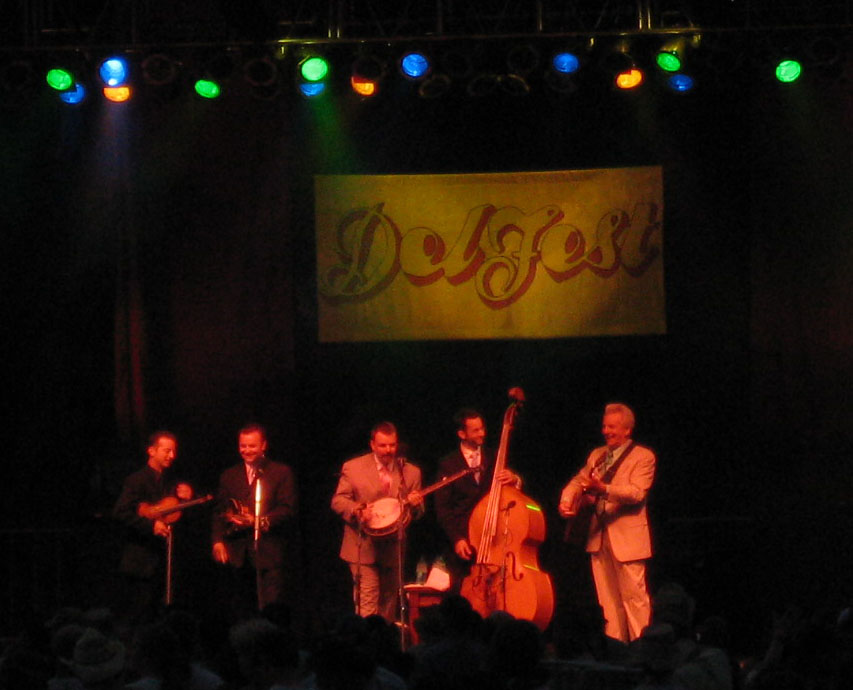
Del McCoury Band at 2nd Annual DelFest (2009)

In 2008, Del McCoury started DelFest, an annual bluegrass festival in Cumberland, Maryland, held at the Allegany County Fairgrounds. Del McCoury Band plays every night at each of the festivals.

The 5th annual DelFest occurred in May 2012, and major bluegrass acts played such as Steve Martin with the Steep Canyon Rangers, Yonder Mountain String Band, Leftover Salmon, Infamous Stringdusters, Railroad Earth, Béla Fleck, and Sam Bush, most of which had returned from previous years at the festival.

In previous years, acts such Peter Rowan, David Grisman, Jesse McReynolds, The Avett Brothers, Old Crow Medicine Show, Trampled by Turtles, Greensky Bluegrass, and Psychograss have played.

The 14th DelFest resumed in May 2022, after a two-year delay caused by the COVID-19 pandemic.

== Discography ==
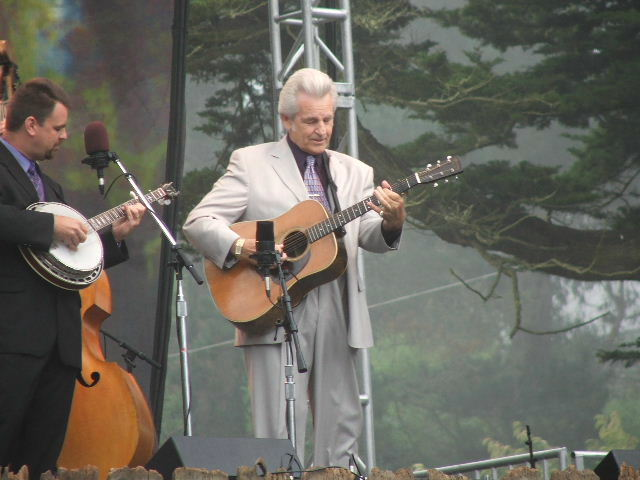
Del McCoury – Hardly Strictly Bluegrass (2005)

=== Solo albums ===
- 1968: Del McCoury Sings Bluegrass (Arhoolie) reissued in 1992 as I Wonder Where You Are Tonight with two previously unissued tracks
- 1971: Livin' on the Mountain (Rebel) released in 1976
- 1971: Collector's Special (Grassound) released in 1976
- 1974: Our Kind of Grass (Rebel SLP-1569) released in 1978
- 1975: Del McCoury (Rebel SLP 1542)
- 1988: Don't Stop The Music (Rounder)
- 1993: A Deeper Shade of Blue (Rounder)
- 2002: I Wonder Where You Are Tonight (Smithsonian Folkways)
- 2005: Classic Bluegrass (Rebel Records)

=== With The GrooveGrass Boyz ===
- 1998: GrooveGrass® 101 featuring the GrooveGrass Boyz™

=== With the Del McCoury Band ===
- 1992: Blue Side of Town
- 1993: A Deeper Shade of Blue
- 1996: The Cold Hard Facts
- 1999: The Mountain (with Steve Earle)
- 1999: The Family
- 2001: Del and the Boys
- 2003: It's Just the Night
- 2005: The Company We Keep
- 2006: The Promised Land
- 2008: Moneyland
- 2009: Family Circle
- 2011: American Legacies (with the Preservation Hall Jazz Band)
- 2012: Old Memories
- 2013: The Streets of Baltimore
- 2016: Del and Woody
- 2017: Del McCoury Still Sings Bluegrass
- 2018: Almost Proud
- 2024: Songs of Love and Life

=== As the McCoury Brothers (with Jerry McCoury) ===
- 1987: The McCoury Brothers (Rounder)

=== With the Dixie Pals ===
- 1973: High on a Mountain (Rounder)
- 1975: Del McCoury And The Dixie Pals (Revonah R-916)
- 1980: Live in Japan (Copper Creek)
- 1981: Take Me To The Mountains (Leather LBG-8107) reissued in 1983 as Rebel REB 1622)
- 1983: Best Of Del McCoury And The Dixie Pals (Rebel REB 1610)
- 1985: Sawmill (Rebel REB 1636)
- 1991: Classic Bluegrass (Rebel) compilation of 1974-1984 Rebel Records recordings

=== With Mac Wiseman and Doc Watson ===
- 1998: Del Doc & Mac (Sugar Hill)

=== Also appears on ===
- 2011: Audie Blaylock and Redline - I'm Going Back to Old Kentucky: A Bill Monroe Celebration (Rural Rhythm)

== Awards and honors ==
Del McCoury has won 31 International Bluegrass Music Association Awards, including Entertainer of the Year four consecutive times (nine total). McCoury has also won IBMA Male Vocalist of the Year four times. In 2004 he was nominated for the Best Bluegrass Album Grammy Award for It's Just The Night, and in 2006 he won his first Grammy Award, in the same category, for The Company We Keep. In 2014, McCoury was nominated and won his second Grammy Award for The Streets of Baltimore. He was a recipient of a 2010 National Heritage Fellowship awarded by the National Endowment for the Arts, which is the United States government's highest honor in the folk and traditional arts. McCoury received the Bluegrass Star Award, presented by the Bluegrass Heritage Foundation, in 2015. The award is bestowed upon bluegrass artists who do an exemplary job of advancing traditional bluegrass music and bringing it to new audiences while preserving its character and heritage.

=== International Bluegrass Music Association Awards ===
Del McCoury Band, 2007

- 1990 Male Vocalist of the Year – Del McCoury
- 1991 Male Vocalist of the Year – Del McCoury
- 1992 Male Vocalist of the Year – Del McCoury
- 1994 Entertainer of the Year – The Del McCoury Band
- 1994 Album of the Year – A Deeper Shade of Blue; Del McCoury
- 1996 Instrumental Group of the Year – The Del McCoury Band
- 1996 Entertainer of the Year – Del McCoury
- 1996 Male Vocalist of the Year – Del McCoury
- 1997 Instrumental Group of the Year – The Del McCoury Band
- 1997 Entertainer of the Year – The Del McCoury Band
- 1997 Album of the Year – True Life Blues – The Songs of Bill Monroe; Sam Bush, Vassar Clements, Mike Compton, Jerry Douglas, Stuart Duncan, Pat Enright, Greg Garing, Richard Greene, David Grier, David Grisman, John Hartford, Bobby Hicks, Kathy Kallick, Laurie Lewis, Mike Marshall, Del McCoury, Ronnie McCoury, Jim Nunally, Scott Nygaard, Mollie O'Brien, Tim O'Brien, Alan O'Bryant, Herb Pedersen, Todd Phillips, John Reischman, Peter Rowan, Craig Smith, Chris Thile, Tony Trischka, Roland White.
- 1998 Entertainer of the Year – The Del McCoury Band
- 1999 Entertainer of the Year – The Del McCoury Band
- 2000 Entertainer of the Year – The Del McCoury Band
- 2002 Entertainer of the Year – The Del McCoury Band
- 2002 Song of the Year – 1952 Vincent Black Lightning; The Del McCoury Band (artists), Richard Thompson (writer)
- 2003 Entertainer of the Year – The Del McCoury Band
- 2004 Entertainer of the Year – The Del McCoury Band
- 2004 Album of the Year – It's Just the Night; The Del McCoury Band
- 2024 Entertainer of the Year – The Del McCoury Band

=== Grammy Awards ===
McCoury has won two Grammy Awards from fifteen nominations.

- 2006 Best Bluegrass Album – The Company We Keep
- 2014 Best Bluegrass Album – Streets of Baltimore
