= Take Me with You (song) =

Single by Patricia Conroy

from the album Blue Angel
- Released: 1991
- Genre: Country
- Length: 3:35
- Label: WEA

Patricia Conroy singles chronology
"This Time" (1990)	"Take Me with You" (1991)	"Blue Angel" (1991)

"Take Me with You" is a song recorded by Canadian country music artist Patricia Conroy. It was released in 1991 as the second single from her debut album, Blue Angel. It peaked at number 8 on the RPM Country Tracks chart in April 1991.

== Chart performance ==
Chart (1991)	Peak position
Canada Country Singles (RPM)	8

=== Year-end charts ===
Chart (1991)	Position
Canada Country Tracks (RPM)	81
