= I Don't Wanna Be the One =

Single by Patricia Conroy

from the album You Can't Resist
- Released: 1995
- Genre: Country
- Length: 3:52
- Label: WEA
- Songwriter: Patricia Conroy
- Producers: Mike Wanchic; Justin Niebank

Patricia Conroy singles chronology
"You Can't Resist It" (1995)	"I Don't Wanna Be the One" (1995)	"Keep Me Rockin'" (1996)

"I Don't Wanna Be the One" is a song recorded by Canadian country music artist Patricia Conroy. It was released in 1995 as the fourth single from her third studio album, You Can't Resist. It peaked at number 8 on the RPM Country Tracks chart in October 1995.

== Chart performance ==
Chart (1995)	Peak position
Canada Country Singles (RPM)	8

=== Year-end charts ===
Chart (1995)	Position
Canada Country Tracks (RPM)	77
