= Bad Day for Trains (song) =

Single by Patricia Conroy

from the album Bad Day for Trains
- Released: 1992
- Genre: Country
- Length: 3:44
- Label: WEA
- Songwriters: Patricia Conroy; Ralph Murphy
- Producers: Pat McMakin; Randall Prescott

Patricia Conroy singles chronology
"My Baby Loves Me (Just the Way That I Am)" (1992)	"Bad Day for Trains" (1992)	"What Do You Care" (1993)

"Bad Day for Trains" is a song recorded by Canadian country music artist Patricia Conroy. It was released in 1992 as the second single from her second studio album, Bad Day for Trains. It peaked at number 7 on the RPM Country Tracks chart in November 1992.

== Chart performance ==
Chart (1992)	Peak position
Canada Country Singles (RPM)	7

=== Year-end charts ===
Chart (1992)	Position
Canada Country Tracks (RPM)	80
