= The GrooveGrass Boyz =

American funk band

- Origin: Nashville, Tennessee, United States
- Genres: Funk
- Years active: 1996–1998
- Labels: Imprint Records; Reprise/Warner Bros. Records
- Past members: Bootsy Collins; Jerry Douglas; Del McCoury; Scott Rouse; Mac Wiseman

The GrooveGrass Boyz were an American funk band. Their style was a mix of bluegrass, funk and freestyle music. The group was founded as a side project by record producer and session musician Scott Rouse in 1987, after he began experimenting with dance mixes of bluegrass and country songs, eventually applying the term groovegrass to his mix of music. He then moved to Nashville, Tennessee, and joined several other country musicians and funk bass guitarist Bootsy Collins, releasing a country version of Los del Río's "Macarena" and two albums. The country cover of "Macarena" charted on both the Hot Country Songs charts and the Bubbling Under Hot 100, and was the group's only chart entry.

== History ==
Rouse, a session musician from Boston, Massachusetts, first came up with the idea of GrooveGrass in the mid-1980s when he began experimenting with dance mixes of bluegrass songs such as Alton Delmore's "Deep River Blues". His mixes became popular at local clubs, eventually leading to one disc jockey terming the blend of music "groovegrass".

Rouse then moved to Nashville, Tennessee, at the request of his friend, musician Doc Watson. Rouse's first country remix was for Warner Bros. It was a remix of John Anderson's 1983 Number One single "Swingin'." At Anderson's request, Warner never released the cut, although it became a popular bootleg recording. It was followed by an EP remix of "Rocky Top", which was released and went on to sell more than 100,000 copies in the United States. Rouse also produced comedian Jeff Foxworthy's trademark "You might be a redneck if…" single he named called the "Redneck Stomp", one of several similar musical tracks included on Foxworthy's Crank It Up: The Music Album.

Soon afterward, Rouse recruited several other musicians, including members of Del McCoury's band, funk bass guitarist Bootsy Collins, and bluegrass multi-instrumentalist Jerry Douglas, to perform as the GrooveGrass Boyz. They saw their most successful release in late 1996, when they put out a country version of the "Macarena", a song made popular earlier that year by Spanish duo Los del Río. The GrooveGrass Boyz' version, released on Imprint Records, peaked at No. 70 on the Hot Country Songs charts and No. 7 on the Bubbling Under Hot 100. The single sold over 100,000 copies. It was followed in 1997 by a self-released album, and in 1998 by another album on Reprise Records. These included Doc Watson, Mac Wiseman, Bernie Leadon, and other notable artists. Neither album produced any chart single.

== Discography ==
=== Albums ===
Title	Album details
The GrooveGrass Boyz	Release date: 1997; Label: self-released
GrooveGrass® 101 featuring the GrooveGrass Boyz™	Release date: November 24, 1998; Label: Reprise/Warner Bros. Records

=== Singles ===
Year	Single	Peak chart positions	
Year	Single	US Country	US Bubbling
1996	"Macarena (Country Version)"	70	7
