= Blank Pages (Patricia Conroy song) =

Single by Patricia Conroy

from the album Bad Day for Trains
- Released: 1993
- Genre: Country
- Length: 3:17
- Label: WEA
- Songwriter: Patricia Conroy
- Producer: Randall Prescott

Patricia Conroy singles chronology
"What Do You Care" (1993)	"Blank Pages" (1993)	"Here We Go Again" (1993)

"Blank Pages" is a song recorded by Canadian country music artist Patricia Conroy. It was released in 1993 as the fourth single from her second studio album, Bad Day for Trains. It peaked at number 7 on the RPM Country Tracks chart in August 1993.

== Chart performance ==
Chart (1993)	Peak position
Canada Country Singles (RPM)	7

=== Year-end charts ===
Chart (1993)	Position
Canada Country Tracks (RPM)	74
