= Life No. 9 =

"Life #9"

Single by Martina McBride

from the album The Way That I Am
- B-side: "Ashes"
- Released: January 3, 1994
- Genre: Country
- Length: 4:03
- Label: RCA Nashville
- Songwriters: Kostas; Tony Perez
- Producers: Paul Worley; Ed Seay; Martina McBride

Martina McBride singles chronology
"My Baby Loves Me" (1993)	"Life #9" (1994)	"Independence Day" (1994)

"Life #9" is a song written by Kostas and Tony Perez, and recorded by American country music artist Martina McBride. It was released in January 1994 as the second single from her album The Way That I Am. The song was her fifth single release overall, and peaked at number 6 on the U.S. Billboard Hot Country Singles & Tracks chart and at number 8 on the RPM Country Tracks chart in Canada.

== Content ==
McBride considered the song "not the kind of song, melody, attitude of whatever that I was really comfortable singing", and producer Paul Worley thought that it was "not one of [his] favorites" due to it sounding like a disco song.

== Music video ==
A music video was released for the song, directed by Steven Goldmann.

== Personnel ==
The following musicians perform on this track:

- Joe Chemay – bass guitar
- Larry Franklin – fiddle
- Paul Franklin – pedal steel guitar
- Bill Hullett – acoustic guitar
- Anthony S. Martin – backing vocals
- Brent Mason – electric guitar
- Martina McBride – lead and backing vocals
- Steve Nathan – keyboards
- John Wesley Ryles – backing vocals
- Dennis Wilson – backing vocals
- Lonnie Wilson – drums
- Paul Worley – acoustic guitar

== Chart performance ==
Chart (1994)	Peak position
Canada Country Singles (RPM)	8
US Hot Country Songs (Billboard)	6

=== Year-end charts ===
Chart (1994)	Position
Canada Country Tracks (RPM)	85
US Country Songs (Billboard)	69
