= Bob Woodruff (singer) =

American singer-songwriter

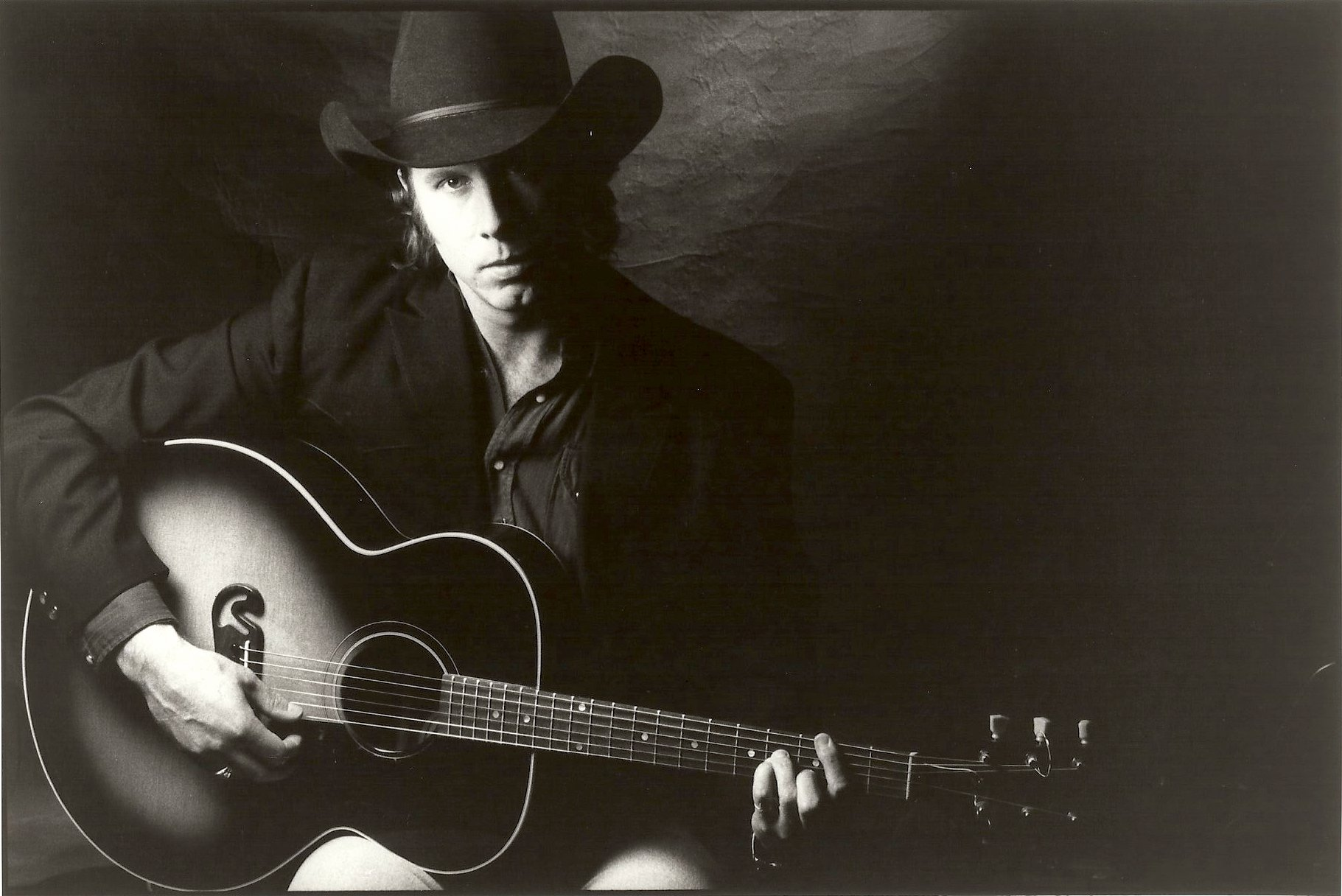

Background information
- Born: March 14, 1961 (age 65)
- Origin: New York City, New York, United States
- Genres: Country
- Occupations: Singer, songwriter, musician
- Instruments: Vocals guitar drums
- Years active: 1994–present
- Labels: Asylum, Imprint
- Formerly of: The Fields
- Website: http://www.bobwoodruffmusic.com/

Bob Woodruff (born March 14, 1961) is an American country music singer and songwriter. Initially, he was a member of a country rock band called The Fields before beginning a career as a solo artist. He released four studio albums (1994's Dreams & Saturday Nights, 1997's Desire Road, 2011's The Lost Kerosene Tapes, 1999 and 2013's The Year We Tried to Kill the Pain) and has charted two singles on the Billboard country music charts, as well as a third on the RPM Country Tracks chart in Canada.

Woodruff's 1994 debut album Dreams & Saturday Nights was produced by Steve Fishell and included instrumentation from James Burton and Bernie Leadon. His second album included covers of songs by John Fogerty and Arthur Alexander. His latest album, The Year We Tried To Kill The Pain, was released in Europe in September 2013.

== Discography ==
=== Albums ===
Title	Album details
Dreams & Saturday Nights	Release date: March 29, 1994; Label: Asylum Records
Desire Road	Release date: March 25, 1997; Label: Imprint Records
The Lost Kerosene Tapes, 1999	Release date: December 31, 2011; Label: Sound Asleep Records
The Year We Tried To Kill the Pain	Release date: September 28, 2013; Label: Rootsy/Warner Music Nordic/Blue Rose Records

=== Singles ===
Year	Single	Peak chart positions		Album
Year	Single	US Country	CAN Country	Album
1994	"Hard Liquor, Cold Women, Warm Beer"	70	81	Dreams & Saturday Nights
1994	"Bayou Girl"	74	67	Dreams & Saturday Nights
1994	"Alright"	—	—	Dreams & Saturday Nights
1997	"Almost Saturday Night"	—	89	Desire Road
"—" denotes releases that did not chart

=== Music videos ===
Year	Video	Director
1994	"Hard Liquor, Cold Women, Warm Beer"	Studio Productions
1994	"Bayou Girl"	Roger Pistole
1995	"Alright"	Steve Boyle
1997	"Almost Saturday Night"	Marius Penczner
