= You Can't Resist It =

Single by Lyle Lovett

from the album Switch Soundtrack
- Released: 1991
- Genre: Pop
- Length: 3:05
- Label: MCA
- Songwriter: Lyle Lovett

Lyle Lovett singles chronology
"Here I Am" (1990)	"You Can't Resist It" (1991)	"You've Been So Good Up to Now" (1992)

"You Can't Resist It" is a song recorded written and originally recorded by Lyle Lovett on his 1986 self-titled debut album. It was included on the soundtrack to the 1991 film Switch, from which it was released as a single.

A live version from the album Live from Texas was released as a single in 1999, becoming a top 10 hit on the Adult Alternative Songs chart.

== Chart performance ==
Chart (1991)	Peak position
Canada Adult Contemporary (RPM)	33
Canada Top Singles (RPM)	77
Chart (1999)	Peak position
U.S. Adult Alternative Songs (Billboard)	6

== Patricia Conroy version ==
"You Can't Resist It"

Single by Patricia Conroy

from the album You Can't Resist
- Released: 1995
- Genre: Country
- Length: 3:10
- Label: WEA
- Songwriter: Lyle Lovett
- Producers: Mike Wanchic; Justin Niebank

Patricia Conroy singles chronology
"What Else Can I Do" (1995)	"You Can't Resist It" (1995)	"I Don't Wanna Be the One" (1995)

"You Can't Resist It" was also recorded by Canadian country music artist Patricia Conroy. It was released in 1995 as the third single from her third studio album, You Can't Resist. It peaked at number 5 on the RPM Country Tracks chart in July 1995.

=== Chart performance ===
Chart (1995)	Peak position
Canada Country Singles (RPM)	5

==== Year-end charts ====
Chart (1995)	Position
Canada Country Tracks (RPM)	23

== Uses in pop culture ==
In 1991, the song was used in the Season Three episode of the TV series Midnight Caller entitled "The Added Starter".
