= You Can't Resist =

Studio album by Patricia Conroy
- Released: 1994
- Genre: Country
- Length: 35:57
- Label: Warner Music Canada
- Producer: Mike Wanchic; Justin Niebank

Patricia Conroy chronology
Bad Day for Trains (1992)	You Can't Resist (1994)	Wild As the Wind (1998)

You Can't Resist is the third studio album by Canadian country music singer-songwriter Patricia Conroy, and was released in 1994 by Warner Music Canada.

On 5 March 1996, Intersound Records released the album in the United States.

== Track listing ==
1. "What Else Can I Do" (Tony Arata, Scott Miller) – 4:15
2. "You Can't Resist It" (Lyle Lovett) – 3:10
3. "Somebody's Leavin'" (Kostas, Matraca Berg) – 4:00
4. "Diamonds" (Tom Kimmel, Karen Besbeck) – 3:35
5. "The Bridge" (Kimmel, Jim Pitman) – 3:30
6. "I Don't Wanna Be the One" (Patricia Conroy) – 3:52
7. "Crazy Fool" (Conroy) – 3:18
8. "Too True Blue" (George Teren, Susan Longacre) – 3:08
9. "Keep Me Rockin'" (Conroy, Jennifer Kimball) – 3:35
10. "Home in Your Arms" (Berg, Lisa Silver) – 3:34

== Personnel ==
- Kenny Aronoff – drums, percussion
- Bruce Bouton – pedal steel guitar, lap steel guitar
- Mike Brignardello – bass guitar
- Kathy Burdick – background vocals
- Dennis Burnside – Hammond organ, piano
- Patricia Conroy – lead vocals
- Dan Dugmore – pedal steel guitar, dobro
- Bob Funk – acoustic guitar, electric guitar
- David Grissom – bass guitar, acoustic guitar, electric guitar
- Sue Medley – background vocals
- Brent Rowan – dobro, acoustic guitar, electric guitar, mandolin
- Lisa Silver – background vocals
- Mike Wanchic – background vocals
- Dennis Wilson – background vocals
- Curtis Young – background vocals

== Chart performance ==
Chart (1994)	Peak position
Canadian RPM Country Albums	3
