= What Do You Care =

Single by Patricia Conroy

from the album Bad Day for Trains
- Released: 1993
- Genre: Country
- Length: 4:01
- Label: WEA
- Songwriters: Bob Funk; Bruce Miller
- Producers: Pat McMakin; Randall Prescott

Patricia Conroy singles chronology
"Bad Day for Trains" (1992)	"What Do You Care" (1993)	"Blank Pages" (1993)

"What Do You Care" is a song recorded by Canadian country music artist Patricia Conroy. It was released in 1993 as the third single from her second studio album, Bad Day for Trains. It peaked at number 8 on the RPM Country Tracks chart in March 1993.

== Chart performance ==
Chart (1993)	Peak position
Canada Country Singles (RPM)	8
