= Independence Day (Martina McBride song) =

Single by Martina McBride

from the album The Way That I Am
- B-side: "True Blue Fool"
- Written: around 1992
- Released: May 2, 1994
- Recorded: 1993
- Studio: The Money Pit (Nashville, TN)
- Genre: Country
- Length: 3:25
- Label: RCA Nashville
- Songwriter: Gretchen Peters
- Producers: Paul Worley; Ed Seay; Martina McBride

Martina McBride singles chronology
"Life #9" (1994)	"Independence Day" (1994)	"Heart Trouble" (1994)

"Independence Day" is a song written by American singer-songwriter Gretchen Peters and recorded by American singer Martina McBride on her 1993 studio album The Way That I Am. It was released on May 2, 1994 as the third single from the album.

The song has been regarded as McBride's signature song. It won the Country Music Association Award for Song of the Year at the 1995 Country Music Association Awards. As of July 2015, the song has sold over 550,000 copies in the United States and has gone on to be certified Platinum.

== Content ==
"Independence Day" was written by Gretchen Peters around 1992. It was originally offered to Reba McEntire, who turned it down; Peters has since stated that she never heard of the song being offered to McEntire. Peters spent over a year and a half writing the track. Peters recorded the song on her 1996 studio album The Secret of Life.

In the video, a daughter (Heidi Butler Prine) recalls a tragic incident she experienced as a child. Her mother (Darcie Jones) was involved in a domestic abuse incident with her alcoholic father (Aaron Wrench). On Independence Day, the daughter walks to the town fair and hears rumors going on about the father's abuse. Apparently the whole town knew about the abuse, but did nothing to help stop it. That day, the mother burns down their house, presumably with the husband and herself inside it, and the daughter is sent to a county home. The music video was produced by American director team Deaton-Flanigen Productions, consisting of William Deaton III and George Flanigen IV, and premiered on CMT on May 20, 1994.

The lyrics have a double meaning in that the woman in the story is finally gaining her "freedom" from her abusive husband. Thus, it is her "Independence Day." The title also refers to the fact that the events noted in the song happened on the United States' Independence Day, or July 4.

== Critical reception ==
In 2024, Rolling Stone ranked the song at number 45 on its 200 Greatest Country Songs of All Time ranking.

== In media ==
Beginning shortly after the September 11 attacks on the World Trade Center, conservative radio talk show host Sean Hannity began using part of the chorus as an opening bumper for his Premiere Radio Networks radio talk show. Writer Gretchen Peters objected to Hannity's use, arguing the song was about domestic violence, not patriotic values. Since she could not stop his use, she collected royalties from him every time it was played and used those royalties to donate to her causes, until Hannity's program dropped the song in mid-2014.

== Personnel ==
Credits from album liner notes.

- Joe Chemay – bass guitar
- Ashley Cleveland – backing vocals
- Paul Franklin – pedal steel guitar
- Vicki Hampton – backing vocals
- Bill Hullett – acoustic guitar
- Mary Ann Kennedy – backing vocals
- Brent Mason – electric guitar
- Martina McBride – lead and backing vocals
- Steve Nathan – keyboards
- Pam Rose – backing vocals
- Lonnie Wilson – drums
- Paul Worley – acoustic guitar

== Charts ==
Weekly chart performance for "Independence Day"
Chart (1994)	Peak position
Canada Country Singles (RPM)	15
US Hot Country Songs (Billboard)	12

=== Year-end charts ===
Year-end chart performance for "Independence Day"
Chart (1994)	Position
US Country (Radio & Records)	90

== Certifications ==
Region	Certification	Certified units/sales
United States (RIAA)	Platinum	1,000,000^{‡}
^{‡} Sales+streaming figures based on certification alone.

== Awards and nominations ==
Year	Ceremony	Award	Result
1994	Academy of Country Music Awards	Video of the Year	Nominated
1995	Grammy Awards	Best Country Vocal Performance - Female	Nominated
1995	Grammy Awards	Best Country Song	Nominated
1995	Country Music Association Awards	Song of the Year	Won
1994	Country Music Association Awards	Video of the Year	Won

It received the RIAA Gold Certificate on December 12, 2018.

== Notable covers ==
In 2002, singer Taylor Horn covered the song for her debut album taylor-made at the age of nine.

In 2003, Pat Benatar performed the song in a duet with Martina McBride on the CMT television series CMT Crossroads.

On American Idol, Carrie Underwood, Lil Rounds and Tristan McIntosh have each performed the song on the show. Carrie Underwood also released the song with her single "Inside Your Heaven".

In 2011, Little Big Town performed Independence Day as a tribute to Martina McBride, who was being honoured as part of ACM's Girls Night Out: Superstar Women of Country show.

In 2019, Martina McBride performed the song as the opener to the 53rd CMA Awards alongside a host of other women in country music. Those featured were: Martina McBride, Dolly Parton, Carrie Underwood, Gretchen Wilson, Reba McEntire, Jennifer Nettles, Karen Fairchild, Kimberly Schlapman, The Highwomen, Tanya Tucker, Crystal Gayle, Terri Clark and Sara Evans.

In October 2019, Kelly Clarkson performed Independence Day during the Kellyoke segment of her daytime talk show The Kelly Clarkson Show.

In 2021, the band American Aquarium recorded the song on their album Slappers, Bangers and Certified Twangers Vol. 2.
