= Bad Day for Trains =

Studio album by Patricia Conroy
- Released: 1992
- Genre: Country
- Length: 31:43
- Label: Warner Music Canada
- Producer: Pat McMakin; Randall Prescott

Patricia Conroy chronology
Blue Angel (1990)	Bad Day for Trains (1992)	You Can't Resist (1994)

Bad Day for Trains is the second studio album by Canadian country music singer-songwriter Patricia Conroy, and was released in 1992 by Warner Music Canada. The album was named Album of the Year by the Canadian Country Music Association in 1993.

== Track listing ==
1. "Bad Day for Trains" (Patricia Conroy, Ralph Murphy) – 3:44
2. "My Baby Loves Me (Just the Way That I Am)" (Gretchen Peters) – 2:40
3. "What Do You Care" (Bob Funk, Bruce Miller) – 4:01
4. "Blank Pages" (Conroy) – 3:17
5. "Still Life with a Heartache" (Sam Hogin, Peters) – 3:35
6. "Talkin' to a Stranger" (Rodney Crowell, Keith Sykes) – 2:37
7. "Keep Me from Blowin' Away" (Paul Craft) – 3:06
8. "Johnny's Too Smart" (Conroy) – 3:18
9. "Here We Go Again" (Jim Foster) – 2:34
10. "Cat and Mouse" (Conroy) – 3:44

== Chart performance ==
Chart (1992)	Peak position
Canadian RPM Country Albums	20
