= I Wanna Go Too Far =

Single by Trisha Yearwood

from the album Thinkin' About You
- B-side: "The Restless Kind"
- Released: July 31, 1995
- Studio: Sound Emporium (Nashville, Tennessee)
- Genre: Country
- Length: 2:59
- Label: MCA
- Songwriters: Kent Robbins, Layng Martine Jr.
- Producer: Garth Fundis

Trisha Yearwood singles chronology
"You Can Sleep While I Drive" (1995)	"I Wanna Go Too Far" (1995)	"On a Bus to St. Cloud" (1996)

"I Wanna Go Too Far" is a song written by Kent Robbins and Layng Martine Jr., and recorded by American country music artist Trisha Yearwood. It was released in July 1995 as the fourth single from the album Thinkin' About You. The song reached number 9 on the US Billboard Hot Country Singles & Tracks chart.

== Critical reception ==
Deborah Evans Price, of Billboard magazine reviewed the song favorably, calling it "a great uptempo ode to rocking the boat and living life to its finest." She goes on to say that Yearwood conveys a "sense of yearning and urgency" and this successfully taps into the emotional core.

== Chart performance ==
"I Wanna Go Too Far" debuted at number 68 on the U.S. Billboard Hot Country Singles & Tracks for the week of August 5, 1995.

Chart (1995)	Peak position
Canada Country Singles (RPM)	25
US Hot Country Songs (Billboard)	9
