= Keep Me Rockin' =

Single by Patricia Conroy

from the album You Can't Resist
- Released: 1996
- Genre: Country
- Length: 3:35
- Label: WEA
- Songwriters: Patricia Conroy; Jennifer Kimball
- Producers: Mike Wanchic; Justin Niebank

Patricia Conroy singles chronology
"I Don't Wanna Be the One" (1995)	"Keep Me Rockin'" (1996)	"Mary on the Dashboard" (1997)

"Keep Me Rockin'" is a song recorded by Canadian country music artist Patricia Conroy. It was released in 1996 as the fifth single from her third studio album, You Can't Resist. It peaked at number 3 on the RPM Country Tracks chart in March 1996.

== Chart performance ==
Chart (1996)	Peak position
Canada Country Singles (RPM)	3

=== Year-end charts ===
Chart (1996)	Position
Canada Country Tracks (RPM)	38
