= Layng Martine Jr. =

American songwriter (born 1942)

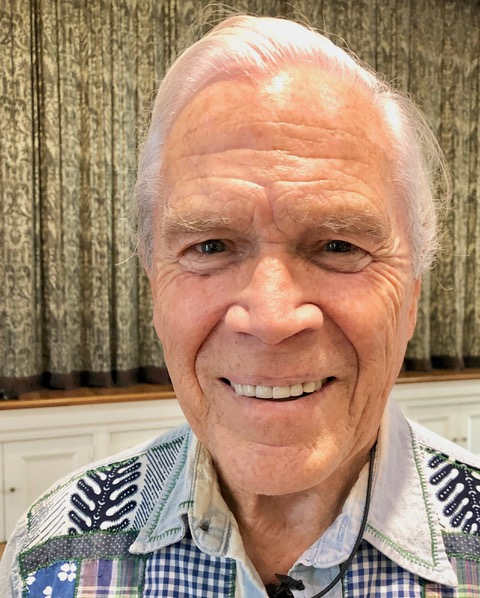

Background information
- Born: James Layng Martine Jr. 1942 (age 83–84); New York City, U.S.
- Genres: Country; pop
- Occupations: Songwriter; author
- Instruments: Vocal; guitar
- Website: layngmartinejr.com

James Layng Martine Jr. (born March, 1942) is an American songwriter whose compositions have appeared on the country and pop music charts over a four-decade span beginning in the late 1960s. His songs, "Way Down" and "Rub it In", have each been recorded by over 20 artists. In 2013, he was inducted into the Nashville Songwriters Hall of Fame. Some of Martine's writing credits include Elvis Presley's million-selling "Way Down"; The Pointer Sisters' "Should I Do It" and Trisha Yearwood's "I Wanna Go Too Far".

== Early life ==
Martine Jr. was born in New York City in 1942. The eldest of five children, he grew up in Stamford, Connecticut. His mother wrote for a movie magazine and later a column called "Teen Scene" for Family Circle Magazine; his father sold advertising for a magazine called Babytalk and later worked for Dell Publishing Company. George T. Delacorte Jr., Dell founder, gave young Martine bundles of comic books; while reading those, Martine saw an advertisement for Cloverine Salve and greeting cards and sold these items and others door-to-door.

Martine went to boarding school at Mount Hermon School in northwestern Massachusetts, then on to Denison University, but left school after the first year. Beginning in 1961, he got a job as a copyboy for Time Magazine, then was accepted to Columbia University in New York.

While listening to the radio when working one summer as a house painter, Martine became convinced that he could write a song, despite the fact that he had no musical training and did not play any musical instrument. After writing his first song, he had the temerity to look up established record publishers in the New York phone book, take a subway from school to visit them, and present himself unannounced. They declined the song, but the executives were helpful in providing advice and some contacts. After college he worked for an advertising firm on Madison Avenue, but continued to write songs in his free time.

== Career ==
He was nominated for a Grammy Award in 1993 for Best Country Song, for co-writing Reba McEntire's "The Greatest Man I Never Knew". Martine's song "Rub It In", a number one country hit for Billy "Crash" Craddock in 1974, became a long-running TV commercial called "Plug It In" for SC Johnson's Glade Plug-ins air freshening product. This song was previously a No. 65 single on the Billboard Hot 100 for Martine himself in 1971, whose version was released on Barnaby Records. His song, "Way Down", was recorded by Elvis Presley in 1976, Presley's last record to make the charts. The songs Way Down and Rub it In, have each been recorded by over 20 artists. In 2013, he was inducted into the Nashville Songwriters Hall of Fame.

Martine authored an article for The New York Times "Modern Love" column about his continued love story with his wife Linda after she became paraplegic in an automobile accident. This article was one of the Times' most-emailed "Modern Love" essays. Martine said that the enormous response to this article was the inspiration for him to write a memoir entitled Permission to Fly, published in 2019. The book is an inside look at the song-writing side of the music industry.

In 2023, The Wall Street Journal featured Martine in a music review by Barry Mazor. It discussed a 2023 album by Martine entitled Music Man, produced by his son Tucker Martine, himself a Grammy-nominated sound engineer, producer, and keyboardist. The younger Martine, of a different generation, chose songs written by his father over various decades and gave them an updated "roots rock sound".

== Songs written ==
- "Don't Boogie Woogie When You Say Your Prayers Tonight" – Jerry Lee Lewis, Ray Stevens, Eddy Mitchell
- "Everybody Needs a Rainbow" – Ray Stevens
- "Put It In Your Ear" – Ray Stevens
- "The Greatest Man I Never Knew" – Reba McEntire
- "I Don't Want to Be a One Night Stand" – Reba McEntire
- "I Wanna Go Too Far" – Trisha Yearwood
- "I Was Blown Away" – Pam Tillis
- "Let Me On" – Jerry Lee Lewis, Carl Perkins
- "Maybe She's Human" – Kathy Mattea
- "Rub It In" – Billy "Crash" Craddock
- "Should I Do It" – The Pointer Sisters
- "Too Fast for Rapid City" – Sheila Andrews
- "You Got The Job" – Charly McClain
- "Way Down" – Elvis Presley
- "I Wanna Do It With You" - Barry Manilow
