= Heart Trouble (Martina McBride song) =

Single by Martina McBride

from the album The Way That I Am
- B-side: "That Wasn't Me"
- Released: October 24, 1994
- Genre: Country
- Length: 3:19
- Label: RCA Nashville
- Songwriter: Paul Kennerley
- Producers: Paul Worley; Ed Seay; Martina McBride

Martina McBride singles chronology
"Independence Day" (1994)	"Heart Trouble" (1994)	"Where I Used to Have a Heart" (1995)

"Heart Trouble" is a song recorded by American country music artist Martina McBride. It was released on October 24, 1994 as the fourth single from the album The Way That I Am. The song reached #21 on the Billboard Hot Country Singles & Tracks chart. The song was written by Paul Kennerley.

In 2003, Wanda Jackson covered the song and made it the title track to her album of the same name.

== Chart performance ==
Chart (1994)	Peak position
US Hot Country Songs (Billboard)	21
Canadian RPM Country Tracks	32
