= Patricia Conroy =

Canadian country music singer

- Born: January 30, 1964 (age 62); Montreal, Quebec, Canada
- Origin: Vancouver, British Columbia, Canada
- Genre: Country
- Occupation: Singer-songwriter
- Years active: 1987–present
- Labels: Warner Music Canada; Intersound; Shoreline; Sunset; Koch; 306; Angeline Entertainment
- Website: www.patriciaconroy.net

Patricia Conroy (born January 30, 1964) is a Canadian singer-songwriter. In her career, she has released five studio albums and one compilation album. She has also released 25 singles, including the RPM Country Tracks number one singles "Somebody's Leavin'" (1994) and "What Else Can I Do" (1995). As a songwriter, Conroy has written singles for several artists including Steel Magnolia ("Just By Being You (Halo and Wings)"), Emerson Drive ("She Always Gets What She Wants"), and Lady A ("Champagne Night").

Conroy was inducted into the Canadian Country Music Hall of Fame in 2021.

== Biography ==
=== Early life ===
Patricia Conroy was born on January 30, 1964, in Montreal, Quebec, Canada. Conroy was born into a musical family, which was influenced by her mother's Maritime country background and her father's Irish roots. As a young girl, she took piano and voice lessons, performing in a local church with her family band, the Shamrock Ceili Band. In the late 1980s Conroy entered and won a Battle of the Bands contest with local musicians in Vancouver, British Columbia, receiving $10,000 prize money which gave her the opportunity to record demos of some of her original material. By 1990, Conroy had been signed to a recording contract at Warner Music Canada.

=== Career ===
Her first album for the label, Blue Angel, was released later the same year. Two singles from the album, "This Time" and "Take Me With You", reached the top 10 in Canada.

Conroy's second album, Bad Day for Trains, was released in 1992. It contained four Top 10s, including "Bad Day for Trains", "What Do You Care", "Blank Pages" and "My Baby Loves Me (Just the Way That I Am)", later recorded by Martina McBride.

Her most successful album to date, You Can't Resist, was released in 1994. The first two songs released from the album, "Somebody's Leavin'" and "What Else Can I Do", both reached No. 1. Follow-up singles "You Can't Resist It", "I Don't Wanna Be the One" and "Keep Me Rockin'" all reached the Top 10.

Conroy signed with Shoreline Records in 1998 for the release of her fourth album, Wild As the Wind. She continued her streak of hits with the songs "Direction Of Love" and "Ain't Nobody Like You". Her Greatest Hits album was released two years later, along with the Top 40 song "Nobody's Fault".

In 2005, Conroy returned with her new music video, "When". In 2007, Conroy signed with 306 Records/Angeline Entertainment for the release of her first full-length studio album in 9 years, Talking to Myself. Three singles have been released from the album so far: "When", "Talking to Myself" and "Ray of Sun."

In a statement made on her official website in June 2008, Conroy announced that she was taking time to write songs for Lisa Brokop, Jimmy Rankin, Chad Brownlee and Michelle Wright for their upcoming projects. She has songwriting credits on The Rankin Family's album, These Are the Moments, released February 3, 2009. "Just By Being You (Halo and Wings)", a song co-written by Conroy, was released by American country duo Steel Magnolia in 2010. Emerson Drive recorded Conroy's "She Always Get What She Wants" for their 2012 album Roll and released it as the album's fourth single in June 2013.

In 2020, Conroy co-wrote the song "Champagne Night", which was featured on the NBC songwriting competition series Songland and recorded by Lady A. The song reached number one on the Billboard Country Airplay chart in January 2021.

== Discography ==
=== Studio albums ===
| Title | Details | Peak positions |
| Title | Details | CAN Country |
|---|---|---|
| Blue Angel | Release date: 1990; Label: Warner Music Canada | — |
| Bad Day for Trains | Release date: 1992; Label: Warner Music Canada | 20 |
| You Can't Resist | Release date: 1994; Label: Warner Music Canada | 3 |
| Wild As the Wind | Release date: March 17, 1998; Label: Shoreline / Sunset | — |
| Talking to Myself | Release date: January 30, 2007; Label: 306 / Angeline Entertainment | — |
"—" denotes releases that did not chart

=== Compilation albums ===
| Title | Details |
|---|---|
| Greatest Hits | Release date: February 29, 2000; Label: Koch Records |

=== Singles ===
| Year | Single | Peak positions | Album |
| Year | Single | CAN Country | Album |
|---|---|---|---|
| 1987 | "My Heart's on Fire" | — | Non-album singles |
| 1989 | "Come on Back" | — | Non-album singles |
| 1990 | "A Thousand Rails" | 56 | Non-album singles |
| 1990 | "This Time" | 10 | Blue Angel |
| 1991 | "Take Me with You" | 8 | Blue Angel |
| 1991 | "Blue Angel" | 44 | Blue Angel |
| 1991 | "Why I'm Walkin'" | 73 | Blue Angel |
| 1992 | "My Baby Loves Me (Just the Way That I Am)" | 8 | Bad Day for Trains |
| 1992 | "Bad Day for Trains" | 7 | Bad Day for Trains |
| 1993 | "What Do You Care" | 8 | Bad Day for Trains |
| 1993 | "Blank Pages" | 7 | Bad Day for Trains |
| 1993 | "Here We Go Again" | 12 | Bad Day for Trains |
| 1994 | "Somebody's Leavin'" | 1 | You Can't Resist |
| 1995 | "What Else Can I Do" | 1 | You Can't Resist |
| 1995 | "You Can't Resist It" | 5 | You Can't Resist |
| 1995 | "I Don't Wanna Be the One" | 8 | You Can't Resist |
| 1996 | "Keep Me Rockin'" | 3 | You Can't Resist |
| 1997 | "Mary on the Dashboard" | 77 | Wild as the Wind |
| 1998 | "Direction of Love" | 8 | Wild as the Wind |
| 1999 | "Ain't Nobody Like You" | 9 | Wild as the Wind |
| 1999 | "Don't You Forget (Who You're Talkin' To)" | — | Wild as the Wind |
| 2000 | "Nobody's Fault" | 27 | Greatest Hits |
| 2005 | "When" | 27 | Talking to Myself |
| 2006 | "Talking to Myself" | 43 | Talking to Myself |
| 2007 | "Ray of Sun" | — | Talking to Myself |
"—" denotes releases that did not chart

=== Music videos ===
| Year | Video | Director |
|---|---|---|
| 1993 | "Bad Day for Trains" | Steven Goldmann |
| 1993 | "What Do You Care" | |
| 1994 | "Somebody's Leavin'" | Steven Goldmann |
| 1995 | "What Else Can I Do" | Steven Goldmann |
| 1995 | "You Can't Resist It" | |
| 1995 | "I Don't Wanna Be the One" | Tara Johns |
| 1996 | "Keep Me Rockin'" | Tom Bevins |
| 1997 | "Mary on the Dashboard" | Tom Bevins |
| 1998 | "Direction of Love" | Tom Bevins |
| 1999 | "Ain't Nobody Like You" | Tom Bevins |
| 2005 | "When" | Tony Hrynchuk |
| 2005 | "It's Almost Christmas" | |
| 2006 | "Talking to Myself" | |

== Awards ==
=== Canadian Country Music Awards ===
- Vista Rising Star (1990)
- Album of the Year, Bad Day for Trains (1993)
- Female Artist of the Year (1994)
- Independent Artist of the Year (1999, 2000)
- Independent Female Artist of the Year (2006)
- Songwriter of the Year (2021)
- Canadian Country Music Hall of Fame (2021)

=== British Columbia Country Music Awards ===
- Ray McAuley Horizon Award (1988)
- Female Vocalist of the Year (1988, 1989, 1990, 1991)
- Entertainer of the Year (1989, 1991, 1993, 1994)
- Album of the Year, Blue Angel (1991)
- Song of the Year, "Bad Day for Trains" (1993)
- Single of the Year, "Bad Day for Trains" (1993)
- Album of the Year, Bad Day for Trains (1993)
- Song of the Year, "Blank Pages" (1994)
- International Achievement (1997)
