= The Time Has Come (Martina McBride song) =

Single by Martina McBride

from the album The Time Has Come
- B-side: "The Rope"
- Released: May 1992
- Genre: Country
- Length: 2:32
- Label: RCA Nashville
- Songwriters: Susan Longacre, Lonnie Wilson
- Producers: Paul Worley, Ed Seay

Martina McBride singles chronology
"The Time Has Come" (1992)	"That's Me" (1992)

"The Time Has Come" is a song written by Susan Longacre and Lonnie Wilson, and recorded by American country music artist Martina McBride. It was released in May 1992 as her debut single and taken from her debut studio album of the same name. The song reached number 23 on the Billboard Hot Country Singles & Tracks chart.

== Music video ==
The music video was directed by Kate Ryan.

== Track listing ==
1. "The Time Has Come" – 2:32
2. "The Rope" – 3:58

== Chart performance ==
Chart (1992)	Peak position
Canada Country Singles (RPM)	11
US Hot Country Songs (Billboard)	23
