= Dave Pomeroy =

American songwriter

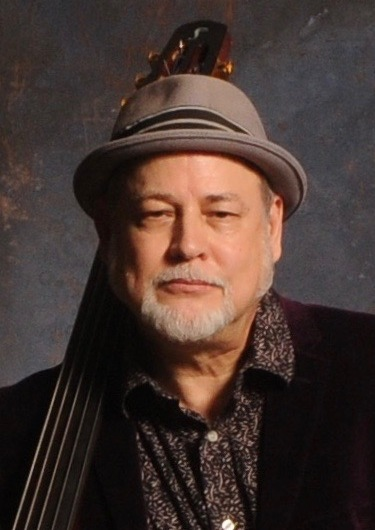
- Dave Pomeroy, in 2017

Background information
- Born: April 26, 1956 (age 70)
- Origin: Nashville, Tennessee, U.S.
- Genres: Country, bluegrass, rock, pop, jazz, world music
- Occupations: Bassist, singer, songwriter, producer
- Instruments: Bass (guitar), electric upright bass, double bass
- Years active: 1961–present
- Label: Earwave
- Member of: Three Ring Circle
- Website: davepomeroy.com

Dave Pomeroy (born April 26, 1956) is an American musician, known as a Nashville vocalist, songwriter, and producer (Earwave Productions) but is best known as a bassist. He has played electric and acoustic bass for many artists, both in the studio and in concert. As a solo artist and producer, he has released 12 albums and 2 DVDs on his own label, Earwave Music. He has written numerous articles and columns for Bass Player, a magazine, and other music publications in addition to contributing as a writer to many books about the music business.

In December 2008, Pomeroy was elected as president of the Nashville Musicians Association, AFM Local 257 of the American Federation of Musicians (AFM) and in June 2010, he was also elected to the AFM's International Executive Board and was re-elected in 2013, 2016, and 2019. Pomeroy has been re-elected without opposition to four more 3-year terms as Local 257 president in November 2011, 2014, 2017 and 2020.

== Youth and career ==
Pomeroy was born in Italy, the son of an American soldier, and lived in various places in Europe. He credits a four-year-long stay in England in the early 1960s as an early musical influence and returned to the country in the mid-70s, living in London to play in many local bands. In 1977, Pomeroy moved to Nashville. He was hired by rockabilly musician Sleepy LaBeef within a couple of weeks and went on tour with him for a year. In 1980 he joined Don Williams' touring band and stayed with him until 1994, when he stopped touring to concentrate on studio work, writing, and producing in Nashville. He founded his own record label Earwave Music in 1989 and has released 12 CDs and 2 DVDs, available at davepomeroy.com. He returned to Williams' band for Williams' comeback tour in September/October 2010 and occasionally filled in with Williams through the end of 2014 .

As a session musician Pomeroy contributed to albums not only by Williams and LaBeef, but also by diverse artists including Trisha Yearwood, Emmylou Harris, Guy Clark, Peter Frampton, Duane Eddy, Neil Diamond, Billy Ray Cyrus, Tom Paxton, George Jones, Billy Joe Shaver, Shelby Lynne, Jon Randall, Brenda Lee, Gretchen Peters, Alan Jackson, Beth Nielsen Chapman, Earl Scruggs, Randy Scruggs, Allison Moorer, Steve Wariner, Asleep at the Wheel, Matraca Berg, Kathy Mattea, Larry Knechtel, Keith Whitley, Jesse Winchester, and Alison Krauss. He is a featured artist on the "Nashville Acoustic Sessions" CD project, with Raul Malo, Rob Ickes, and Pat Flynn, released by CMH Records in 2004. In addition to his long tenure with Don Williams, Pomeroy has performed in concert with Steve Winwood, Willie Nelson, Garth Brooks, John Hiatt, Ricky Skaggs, Adrian Belew, Frampton, Lee Ann Womack, Patty Loveless, Reeves Gabrels, Duane Eddy, and many more artists.

Pomeroy's record label, Earwave Music, has released 12 albums and 2 DVDs of his various projects as solo artist, bandleader, and producer. In the 1990s, he created The All-Bass Orchestra, with personnel ranging from 12 to 22 bassists playing the roles of an entire ensemble. The concert video "The Day The Bass Players Took Over The World", (originally released in 1996 on VHS on Earwave, and re-released on DVD in 2014 with bonus material) featuring special guests Victor Wooten; Steve Bailey, Oteil Burbridge, and Bill Dickens. The unique multi-bass player live project brought attention to Pomeroy's concept of "all-bass music" as demonstrated on his three all-bass and vocal solo projects "Basses Loaded" (1997), "Tomorrow Never Knows" (2003), and "Angel in the Ashes" (2017). He has written more than 50 articles for Bass Player and has contributed to a number of books about music, including writing the forward for Jim Robert's book "American Basses".

Among his most recent projects are Three Ring Circle, an "acoustic jam band powergrass trio" with Rob Ickes and Andy Leftwich, a violinist, and The Taproom Tapes, a live recording of collective improvisations featuring 14 Nashville musicians including Jeff Coffin, Pat Bergeson, Johnny Neel from the Allman Brothers Band and others. Three Ring Circle's second CD, Brothership, was released on ResoRevolution Records in April 2011. He produced Restless, the first album of new material by Sweethearts of the Rodeo in over ten years, released in 2012. His third solo album, Angel in the Ashes, was released in 2017 to positive reviews.

Pomeroy has been active in the Nashville community, raising over $495,000 for Nashville's Room in the Inn Homeless program with his annual "Nashville Unlimited Christmas" concerts over the past 22 years. Over the years, Pomeroy has become more involved in the musicians union as an advocate for working musicians. In December 2008, he was elected president of the Nashville-based Local 257 of the American Federation of Musicians, succeeding longtime president Harold Bradley. In June 2010, he was also elected to the international executive board of the AFM for a three-year term and re-elected in 2013 and 2016. In November 2011, Pomeroy was re-elected without opposition to a second three-year term as the president of Local 257 and again in 2014, 2017, and 2020. He was one of the AFM leaders in the forefront of the effort to reform airline carry on policies for musical instruments, a process completed in December 2014. In addition to his AFM responsibilities, Pomeroy records, writes, and performs in a variety of musical settings. His latest release is the single "World Peace" co-written and performed with Regina McCrary.

== Discography ==
Recordings under his name or as part of a group:

- Dave Pomeroy "Angel in the Ashes" released May 2017
- Dave Pomeroy and the All-Bass Orchestra: "The Day The Bass Players Took Over The World" concert DVD with guests Victor Wooten, Steve Bailey, Oteil Burbridge, Bill Dickens, Duane Eddy, and Bob Babbitt (Earwave)
- Tone Patrol: Thin Air (Earwave), with guests Sam Bush, Bill Miller, and Wayne Roland Brown
- Dave Pomeroy: Basses Loaded (Earwave)
- Dave Pomeroy: Tomorrow Never Knows (Earwave)
- Three Ring Circle: Three Ring Circle (Earwave), with Rob Ickes and Andy Leftwich (Earwave)
- Dave Pomeroy And Friends: The Taproom Tapes (Earwave)
- Three Ring Circle: "Brothership" with Rob Ickes and Andy Leftwich (ResoRevolution)

Pomeroy's producer credits include:

- Don Williams – Best of Live (co-producer)
- Sleepy LaBeef – "Rides Again" DVD and CD (Earwave)
- Sweethearts of The Rodeo – "Restless"
- Jamie Hartford Band - "Stuff That Works" (Earwave)
- Supercool – "Greatest Hits, Vol. 1" (Earwave)

For a comprehensive list of session contributions see Pomeroy's credits at Allmusic.
