= Gretchen Peters =

American musician (born 1957)

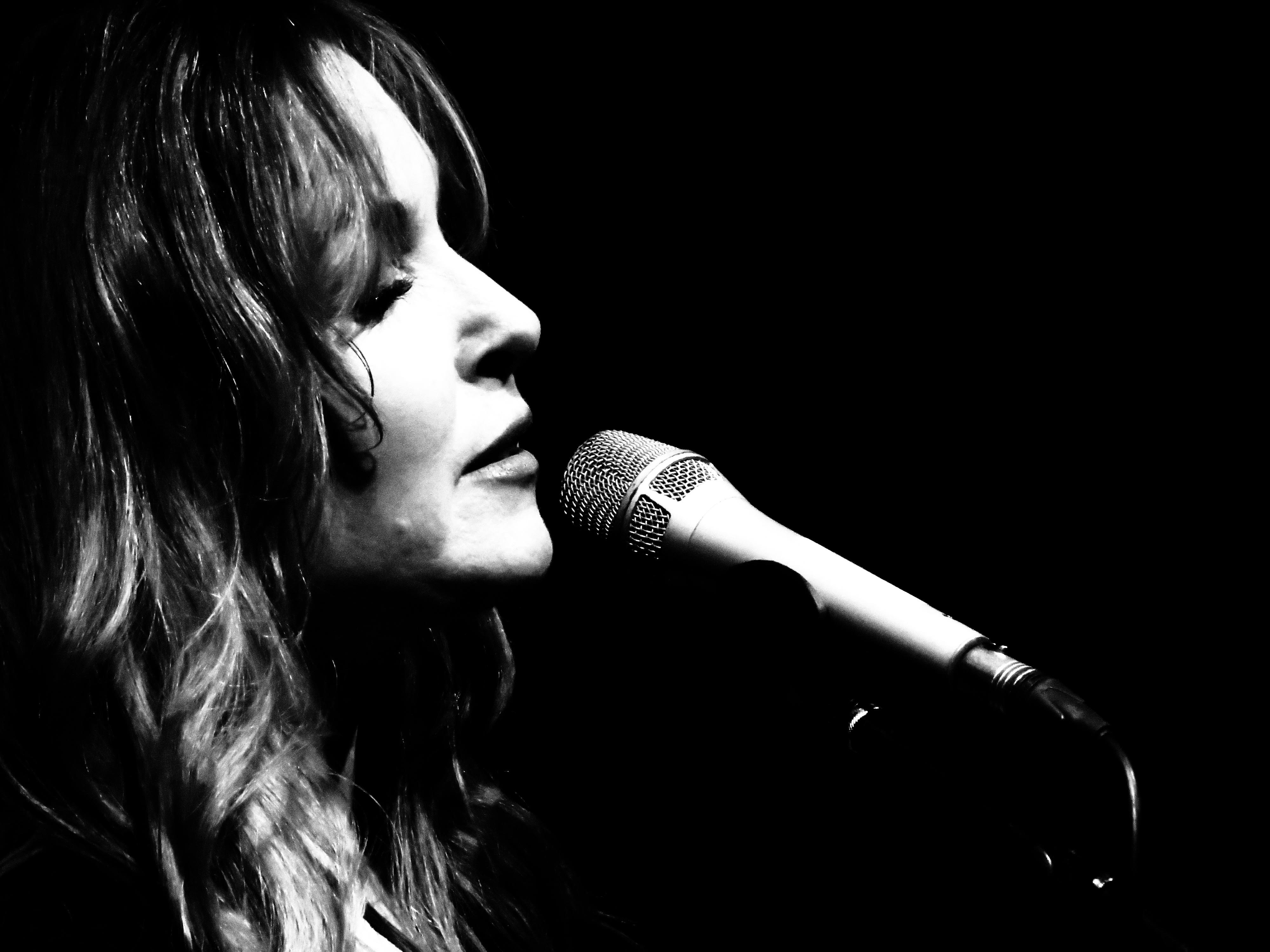

Background information
- Born: November 14, 1957 (age 68); Bronxville, New York, U.S.
- Genres: Country folk; Americana
- Occupations: Singer; songwriter
- Instruments: Guitar; piano; vocals
- Years active: 1996–present
- Labels: Imprint; Purple Crayon; Scarlet Letter
- Spouse: Barry Walsh (m. 2010)
- Website: www.gretchenpeters.com

Gretchen Peters is an American singer and songwriter.

== Early life ==
Peters was born in Bronxville in affluent Westchester County, New York, on November 14, 1957 and spent her early childhood in nearby Pelham Manor. Her father was the journalist and filmmaker William Peters. In 1970, after her parents' divorce, Peters moved with her mother to Boulder, Colorado.

== Music career ==
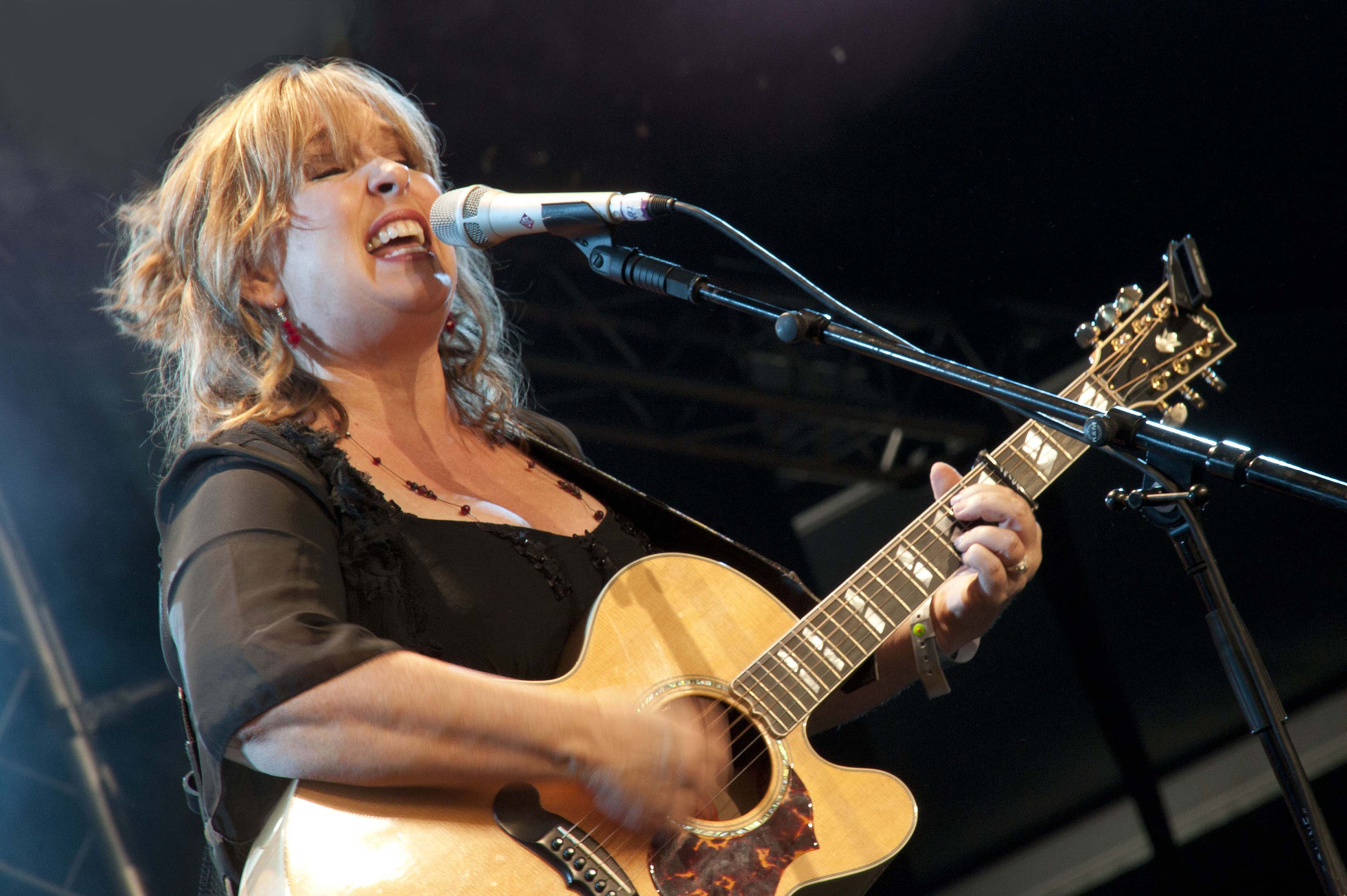
Peters performing at the Cambridge Folk Festival in 2010

In Boulder, she discovered a lively music scene, and began playing at local clubs. In 1988 she moved to Nashville, where she found work as a songwriter, composing hits for Martina McBride, Etta James, Trisha Yearwood, Patty Loveless, George Strait, Anne Murray, Shania Twain, Neil Diamond and co-writing songs with Bryan Adams. Some of Peters' notable compositions include "The Secret of Life", "On a Bus to St. Cloud", "You Don't Even Know Who I Am" and "Independence Day", for which she received the Country Music Association Award for Song of the Year. In addition, Peters has released fourteen studio albums of her own, beginning with 1996's The Secret of Life.

As a writer, Peters' style is defined by melancholy lyrics and dark themes, such as murder, loneliness, PTSD, sexual abuse, and domestic violence. She was inducted to the Nashville Songwriters Hall of Fame on October 5, 2014.

In June 2021, the Academy of Country Music announced that they would honor Peters with the Poet's Award. Presented during the ACM Honors ceremony at the Ryman Auditorium on August 25, 2021, the award honors to a songwriter’s "outstanding and longstanding musical and/or lyrical contributions throughout their career, with special consideration given to a song or songs’ impact on the culture of country music."

On August 12, 2022, Peters announced her intention to retire from full-scale touring and completed a UK "farewell tour" in June 2023, though she will continue to write and record.

== Personal life ==
Peters is married to keyboardist and producer Barry Walsh, her long-time performing partner, who has also performed with the reunified Box Tops.

== Discography ==
=== Studio albums ===
Title	Album details	Peak positions	
Title	Album details	UK Country	UK
The Secret of Life	Release date: June 4, 1996; Label: Imprint Records	3	—
Gretchen Peters	Release date: February 13, 2001; Label: Purple Crayon Records	7	—
Halcyon	Release date: May 31, 2004; Label: Purple Crayon Records	7	—
Burnt Toast & Offerings	Release date: August 7, 2007; Label: Scarlet Letter Records	6	—
Northern Lights	Release date: October 21, 2008; Label: Scarlet Letter Records	—	—
One to the Heart, One to the Head (with Tom Russell)	Release date: February 1, 2009; Label: Scarlet Letter Records	4	—
Hello Cruel World	Release date: January 31, 2012; Label: Scarlet Letter Records	1	70
Blackbirds	Release date: February 10, 2015; Label: Scarlet Letter Records	1	39
Dancing with the Beast	Release date: May 18, 2018; Label: Scarlet Letter Records	2	87
The Night You Wrote That Song	Release date: May 15, 2020; Label: Scarlet Letter Records	1	—
"—" denotes releases that did not chart

=== Live albums ===
Title	Album details	Peak positions
Title	Album details	UK Country Compliatons
Trio: Recorded Live	Release date: March 28, 2006; Label: Purple Crayon Records	3
Woman on the Wheel: Live from the Hello Cruel World Tour 2012 (Limited Edition Book/CD/DVD)	Release date: May 7, 2013; Label: Scarlet Letter Records	—
The Show: Live from the UK	Release date: August 19, 2022; Label: Scarlet Letter Records	1
"—" denotes releases that did not chart

=== Compilation albums ===
Title	Album details	Peak positions
Title	Album details	UK Country Compliatons
Circus Girl: The Best Of (single CD and 2-CD versions)	Release date: May 12, 2009; Label: Scarlet Letter Records	2
The Essential Gretchen Peters	Release date: January 29, 2016; Label: Scarlet Letter Records	1
"—" denotes releases that did not chart

=== Singles ===
Year	Single	Peak positions	Album
Year	Single	US Country	Album
1996	"When You Are Old"	68	The Secret of Life
1996	"I Ain't Never Satisfied"	—	The Secret of Life
2012	"Hello Cruel World"	—	Hello Cruel World
"—" denotes releases that did not chart

=== Guest singles ===
Year	Single	Artist	Peak positions	Album
Year	Single	Artist	US Country	Album
1999	"New Year's Eve 1999"	Alabama	55	—N/a

=== Music videos ===
Year	Video	Director
1996	"When You Are Old"	Bud Schaetzle
2012	"The Matador"	Bud Schaetzle
2015	"Blackbirds"	Eric Power
2018	"Arguing With Ghosts"	Joshua Britt & Neilson Hubbard/Neighborhoods Apart

== Awards and nominations ==
Year	Association	Category	Nominated work	Result
1995	Country Music Association	Song of the Year	"Independence Day"	Won
1995	Grammy Awards	Best Country Song	"Independence Day"	Nominated
1996	Grammy Awards	Best Country Song	"You Don't Even Know Who I Am"	Nominated
1996	Academy of Country Music	Song of the Year	"You Don't Even Know Who I Am"	Nominated
2002	Golden Globes	Best Original Song	"Here I Am"	Nominated
2016	UK Americana Association	International Album of the Year	Blackbirds	Won
2016	UK Americana Association	International Artist of the Year	Gretchen Peters	Nominated
2016	UK Americana Association	International Song of the Year (shared with Ben Glover)	"Blackbirds"	Won
2021	Academy of Country Music	Poet's Award	Gretchen Peters	Won
