= Blame It All on My Roots: Five Decades of Influences =

Box set by Garth Brooks
- Released: November 28, 2013
- Genres: Country; country pop
- Label: Pearl
- Producers: Steve Buckingham; Mark Miller; Allen Reynolds

Garth Brooks chronology
The Ultimate Hits (2007)	Blame It All on My Roots: Five Decades of Influences (2013)	Man Against Machine (2014)

Blame it All on My Roots: Five Decades of Influences is the fourth compilation box set by American country music artist Garth Brooks, released by Pearl Records on November 28, 2013.

The 8-disc set, sold exclusively through Walmart and Sam's Club stores, includes 77 songs on six compact discs, plus 33 music videos, and a full-length live performance from the Garth at Wynn residency show in Las Vegas, on two DVDs. Four of the CDs are new studio albums composed entirely of cover songs. The remaining two CDs and the DVD in the set are a reissue of The Ultimate Hits.

== Content ==
Loosely modeled from the set list of his residency show, Garth at Wynn, the albums feature songs Brooks attributes to the development of his unique country pop genre. They were produced by Mark Miller, with additional production from Steve Buckingham on "Shout." Allen Reynolds produced The Ultimate Hits.

== Commercial performance ==
The album debuted at number 3 on the Billboard Top 200 chart with 164,000 copies from fewer than four days of sales and reached number 1 in its second week with 146,000 marking his ninth top album on the chart. As of September 10, 2014, has sold 893,000 copies in the United States.

== Track listing ==
Country Classics
No.	Title	Writer(s)	Length
1.	"Great Balls of Fire"	Otis Blackwell; Jack Hammer	1:59
2.	"After the Fire Is Gone" (duet with Trisha Yearwood)	L. E. White	2:59
3.	"Act Naturally"	Voni Morrison; Johnny Russell	2:23
4.	"Tonight the Bottle Let Me Down"	Merle Haggard	2:46
5.	"Amos Moses"	Jerry Reed	2:55
6.	"Fishin' in the Dark"	Jim Photoglo; Wendy Waldman	3:24
7.	"Unwound"	Frank Dycus; Dean Dillon	2:28
8.	"Good Ole Boys Like Me"	Bob McDill	4:17
9.	"White Lightnin'"	J.P. Richardson	2:41
10.	"Don't Close Your Eyes"	Bob McDill	4:36
11.	"Jambalaya"	Hank Williams	2:50
Total length:			33:24

Classic Rock
No.	Title	Writer(s)	Length
1.	"Against the Wind"	Bob Seger	4:48
2.	"Superstition"	Stevie Wonder	4:14
3.	"Sweet Home Alabama"	Ed King; Gary Rossington; Ronnie Van Zant	4:53
4.	"Life in the Fast Lane"	Joe Walsh; Glenn Frey; Don Henley	4:37
5.	"Somebody to Love"	Freddie Mercury	4:52
6.	"Bad Company"	Simon Kirke; Paul Rodgers	4:15
7.	"Midnight Rider"	Gregg Allman; Robert K. Payne	3:15
8.	"All Right Now"	Andy Fraser; Paul Rodgers	4:49
9.	"Don't Let the Sun Go Down on Me"	Elton John; Bernie Taupin	5:42
10.	"Addicted to Love"	Robert Palmer	4:01
11.	"Goodnight Saigon"	Billy Joel	6:19
Total length:			51:59

The Melting Pot
No.	Title	Writer(s)	Length
1.	"Black Water"	Patrick Simmons	4:07
2.	"Mrs. Robinson"	Paul Simon	3:54
3.	"Maggie May"	Rod Stewart; Martin Quittenton	4:27
4.	"Who'll Stop the Rain"	John Fogerty	2:42
5.	"Wild World"	Cat Stevens	2:25
6.	"Doctor My Eyes"	Jackson Browne	2:50
7.	"The Weight"	Robbie Robertson	5:09
8.	"Amie"	Craig Fuller	4:21
9.	"Operator (That's Not the Way It Feels)"	Jim Croce	3:50
10.	"You Ain't Goin' Nowhere"	Bob Dylan	3:14
11.	"Don't Let Me Be Lonely Tonight"	James Taylor	2:47
Total length:			40:05

Blue-Eyed Soul
No.	Title	Writer(s)	Length
1.	"I Heard It Through the Grapevine"	Norman Whitfield; Barrett Strong	3:31
2.	"Midnight Train to Georgia"	Jim Weatherly	4:10
3.	"Hold On, I'm Coming"	Isaac Hayes; David Porter	2:49
4.	"Ain't No Sunshine"	Bill Withers	2:20
5.	"Drift Away"	Mentor Williams	4:02
6.	"Stand by Me"	Ben E. King; Jerry Leiber and Mike Stoller	2:59
7.	"Shout"	Rudolph Isley; Ronald Isley; O'Kelly Isley Jr.	4:01
8.	"I Never Loved Someone the Way I Love You"	Ronnie Shannon	3:32
9.	"(Sittin' On) The Dock of the Bay"	Steve Cropper; Otis Redding	2:35
10.	"Lean on Me"	Bill Withers	3:24
11.	"What'd I Say"	Ray Charles	4:10
Total length:			37:51

The Ultimate Hits – CD (Disc 1)
No.	Title	Writer(s)	Length
1.	"Ain't Goin' Down ('Til the Sun Comes Up)"	Kent Blazy; Kim Williams; Garth Brooks	4:32
2.	"Friends in Low Places"	Dewayne Blackwell; Earl "Bud" Lee	4:18
3.	"Shameless"	Billy Joel	4:01
4.	"Two of a Kind, Workin' on a Full House"	Bobby Boyd; Warren Haynes; Dennis Robbins	2:31
5.	"The Beaches of Cheyenne"	Dan Roberts; Bryan Kennedy; Brooks	4:12
6.	"If Tomorrow Never Comes"	Blazy; Brooks	3:37
7.	"Papa Loved Mama"	Williams; Brooks	2:48
8.	"More Than a Memory"	Lee Brice; Kyle Jacobs; Billy Montana	3:22
9.	"Good Ride Cowboy"	Jerrod Niemann; Richie Brown; Kennedy; Bob Doyle	3:26
10.	"In Another's Eyes" (Duet with Trisha Yearwood)	Brooks; Bobby Wood; John Peppard	3:33
11.	"The Fever"	Steven Tyler; Joe Perry; Roberts; Kennedy	2:40
12.	"Midnight Sun"	Brooks; Jerrod Niemann; Richie Brown	3:44
13.	"Learning to Live Again"	Don Schlitz; Stephanie Davis	4:04
14.	"Longneck Bottle" (featuring Steve Wariner)	Wariner; Rick Carnes	2:15
15.	"To Make You Feel My Love"	Bob Dylan	3:55
16.	"We Shall Be Free"	Davis; Brooks	3:47
17.	"The Dance"	Tony Arata	3:37
Total length:			58:53

The Ultimate Hits – CD (Disc 2)
No.	Title	Writer(s)	Length
1.	"Callin' Baton Rouge"	Dennis Linde	2:35
2.	"Two Piña Coladas"	Shawn Camp; Benita Hill; Sandy Mason	3:34
3.	"The Thunder Rolls"	Pat Alger; Brooks	3:42
4.	"That Summer"	Alger; Sandy Mahl; Brooks	4:45
5.	"The River"	Victoria Shaw; Brooks	4:23
6.	"Beer Run" (Duet with George Jones)	Kim Williams; Amanda Williams; Keith Anderson; George Ducas; Blazy	2:28
7.	"Unanswered Prayers"	Alger; Larry Bastian; Brooks	3:23
8.	"Much Too Young (To Feel This Damn Old)"	Randy Taylor; Brooks	2:53
9.	"Workin' for a Livin'" (Duet with Huey Lewis)	Lewis; Chris Hayes	2:40
10.	"What She's Doing Now"	Alger; Brooks	3:23
11.	"When You Come Back to Me Again" (from Frequency)	Jenny Yates; Brooks	4:44
12.	"Standing Outside the Fire"	Yates; Brooks	3:51
13.	"American Honky-Tonk Bar Association"	Kennedy; Jim Rushing	3:31
14.	"The Change"	Arata; Wayne Tester	4:06
15.	"Rodeo"	Larry Bastian	3:51
16.	"Wrapped Up in You"	Wayne Kirkpatrick	4:31
17.	"Leave a Light On" (Bonus Track)	Randy Goodrum; Tommy Simms	3:41
Total length:			59:52

The Ultimate Hits – DVD
No.	Title	Writer(s)	Director(s)	Length
1.	"Much Too Young (To Feel This Damn Old)"	Randy Taylor; Garth Brooks		2:59
2.	"If Tomorrow Never Comes"	Kent Blazy; Brooks	John Lloyd Miller	3:44
3.	"The Dance"	Tony Arata	Miller	4:04
4.	"Friends in Low Places"	Dewayne Blackwell; Earl "Bud" Lee		8:54
5.	"Unanswered Prayers"	Alger; Larry Bastian; Brooks		4:27
6.	"Two of a Kind, Workin' on a Full House"	Bobby Boyd; Warren Haynes; Dennis Robbins		2:38
7.	"The Thunder Rolls"	Alger; Brooks	Bud Schaetzle	4:27
8.	"Rodeo"	Larry Bastian		3:55
9.	"Shameless"	Billy Joel		3:38
10.	"Papa Loved Mama"	Kim Williams; Brooks		2:46
11.	"What She's Doing Now"	Alger; Brooks		3:40
12.	"The River"	Victoria Shaw; Brooks		3:40
13.	"We Shall Be Free"	Stephanie Davis; Brooks	Timothy Miller	3:40
14.	"Learning to Live Again"	Don Schlitz; Stephanie Davis		4:04
15.	"That Summer"	Alger; Sandy Mahl; Brooks		5:01
16.	"Standing Outside the Fire"	Jenny Yates; Brooks	Jon Small	3:55
17.	"Ain't Goin' Down ('Til the Sun Comes Up)"	Blazy; Williams; Brooks		4:46
18.	"Callin' Baton Rouge"	Linde	Salomon	2:47
19.	"American Honky-Tonk Bar Association"	Kennedy; Rushing		4:19
20.	"The Fever"	Tyler; Perry; Roberts; Kennedy		3:24
21.	"To Make You Feel My Love"	Dylan		3:55
22.	"The Beaches of Cheyenne"	Roberts; Kennedy; Brooks		3:43
23.	"The Change"	Arata; Tester	Jon Small	3:40
24.	"Two Piña Coladas"	Don Schlitz; Davis		3:12
25.	"Longneck Bottle" (with special guest Steve Wariner)	Alger; Sandy Mahl; Brooks		3:33
26.	"In Another's Eyes" (Duet with Trisha Yearwood)	Brooks; Bobby Wood; John Peppard	Michael Salomon	3:32
27.	"Wrapped Up in You"	Kirkpatrick	Small	5:27
28.	"Beer Run" (Duet with George Jones)	Williams; Amanda Williams; Anderson; Ducas; Blazy		2:40
29.	"When You Come Back to Me Again" (from Frequency)	Yates; Brooks	Gerry Wenner; Brooks	4:38
30.	"Good Ride Cowboy"	Niemann; Brown; Kennedy; Doyle		3:39
31.	"More Than a Memory"	Brice; Jacobs; Montana		3:39
32.	"Workin' for a Livin'" (Duet with Huey Lewis)	Lewis; Hayes		2:45
33.	"Midnight Sun"	Brooks; Niemann; Brown		4:37
Total length:				124:41

== Personnel ==
- Jill Dell'Abate – background vocals
- Pat Alger – acoustic guitar, background vocals
- Bob Babbitt – bass guitar
- Sam Bacco – percussion
- Bob Bailey – background vocals
- Al "Shaggy" Barclay – background vocals
- Eddie Bayers – drums, handclapping, keyboards, percussion
- DeWayne Blackwell – background vocals
- Bruce Bouton – steel guitar, background vocals
- Tim Bowers – background vocals
- Jimmy Bowland – saxophone
- Garth Brooks – choir, acoustic guitar, electric guitar, handclapping, lead vocals, background vocals
- Sandy Brooks – background vocals
- Stephanie C. Brown – background vocals
- Tom Bukovac – acoustic guitar, electric guitar
- Dennis Burnside – horn arrangements, string arrangements
- Sam Bush – fiddle, mandolin
- Shawn Camp – acoustic guitar
- David Campbell – string arrangements
- Mark Casstevens – acoustic guitar, electric guitar
- Mike Chapman – bass guitar, handclapping, background vocals
- Kathy Chiavola – choir, background vocals
- Johnny Christopher – acoustic guitar
- Charles Cochran – string arrangements
- Allie Colleen – background vocals
- Chad Cromwell – drums, percussion
- Jerry Douglas – dobro
- Bob Doyle – background vocals
- Stuart Duncan – fiddle, mandolin
- Earl of Bud Lee – background vocals
- The Englands – background vocals
- Béla Fleck – banjo
- Pat Flynn – acoustic guitar
- Paul Franklin – steel guitar
- Dave Gant – background vocals
- Steve Gibson – acoustic guitar, electric guitar
- Carl Gorodetzky – string contractor
- Barry Green – trombone
- Charles Green – handclapping
- Tracy Greenwood – handclapping
- Rob Hajacos – fiddle, background vocals
- Vicki Hampton – background vocals
- Joe Harris – background vocals
- Mike Haynes – trumpet
- Dan Heins – background vocals
- John Hobbs – keyboards
- Jim Horn – saxophone
- Jon Mark Ivey – background vocals
- John Barlow Jarvis – keyboards
- Wendy Johnson – choir, background vocals
- Rusty Jones – background vocals
- Gordon Kennedy – acoustic guitar, electric guitar, background vocals
- Steve King – background vocals
- Wayne Kirkpatrick – acoustic guitar, background vocals
- Jennifer Kummer – french horn
- Chris Leuzinger – acoustic guitar, electric guitar
- Sam Levine – saxophone
- Pam "The Chick" Lewis – background vocals
- Terry McMillan – harmonica
- Kenny Malone – drums, percussion
- Blair Masters – keyboards
- Jimmy Mattingly – fiddle
- Edgar Meyer – upright bass
- Joey Miskulin – accordion
- Mark Miller – handclapping
- Doug Moffet – saxophone, soloist
- Buddy Mondlock – background vocals
- Steve Morley – background vocals
- Farrell Morris – percussion
- Jonell Mosser – background vocals
- The Nashville String Machine – strings
- Jim Ed Norman – string arrangements
- Jennifer O'Brien – choir, background vocals
- Mike Palmerman – background vocals
- Billy Panda – acoustic guitar, electric guitar
- Steve Patrick – trumpet
- Wayland Patton – choir, background vocals
- Brian Petree – background vocals
- Dale Pierce – background vocals
- Jon Randall – background vocals
- Michael Rhodes – bass guitar
- Karyn Rochelle – background vocals
- Chris Rodriguez – background vocals
- Jim Rooney – background vocals
- Tami Rose – background vocals
- John Wesley Ryles – background vocals
- Lee Sartin – background vocals
- Lisa Silver – background vocals
- Milton Sledge – drums, percussion
- Jimmie Lee Sloas – bass guitar
- Kira Small – background vocals
- Chris Stapleton – background vocals
- Morgane Hayes-Stapleton – background vocals
- Charley Stefl – background vocals
- Scott Stem – background vocals
- Bryan Sutton – acoustic guitar, electric guitar, mandolin
- Daniel Tashian – background vocals
- Vaneese Thomas – background vocals
- Fonzi Thornton – background vocals
- Steve Wariner – acoustic guitar, background vocals
- Bergen White – string arrangements, background vocals
- Hurshel Wiginton – choir, background vocals
- Bobby Wood – handclapping, keyboards, background vocals
- Glenn Worf – bass guitar
- Trisha Yearwood – choir, background vocals
- Curtis Young – choir, background vocals
- Reggie Young – acoustic guitar, electric guitar

== Charts ==
=== Weekly charts ===
Chart (2013–2014)	Peak position
Canadian Albums (Billboard)	20
Irish Albums (IRMA)	12
US Billboard 200	1
US Top Country Albums (Billboard)	1
US Independent Albums (Billboard)	1

=== Year-end charts ===
Chart (2014)	Position
US Billboard 200	9
US Independent Albums (Billboard)	1
US Top Country Albums (Billboard)	2
