= Triple Live =

Live album by Garth Brooks
- Released: November 1, 2019
- Recorded: 2014–2019
- Genre: Country; country rock; country pop
- Length: 104:00
- Label: Pearl
- Producer: Garth Brooks

Garth Brooks chronology
Gunslinger (2016)	Triple Live (2019)	Fun (2020)

Triple Live is the second live album released by American country music artist Garth Brooks. The album was recorded during Brooks' 2014–17 world tour, as well as his Stadium Tour. The album has two mixes: a traditional live mix, which was released in 2019 as part of The Legacy Collection box set, and a 'fan mix', which was released on August 27, 2018, as a free download.

== Track listing ==
All places where recorded was first published on Garth Brooks Believers Facebook group.

=== "Fan Mix" Edition, The Legacy Collection 3xCD Edition, Anthology Part III: Live Edition ===
This listing was taken from the "fan mix" released on August 27, 2018. It would later appear in Anthology Part III: Live and also in The Legacy Collection vinyl set.

==== Disc one ====
1. "The Thunder Rolls" (Pat Alger, Garth Brooks) – 4:54
  - recorded on March 18, 2018, at Houston Livestock Show & Rodeo, Houston, Texas
2. "That Summer" (Alger, Sandy Mahl, Brooks) – 4:48
3. "Ask Me How I Know" (Mitch Rossell) – 3:32
4. "Fishin' in the Dark" (Wendy Waldman, Jim Photoglo) – 3:38
  - recorded on December 23, 2017, at Bridgestone Arena, Nashville, Tennessee
5. "In Another's Eyes" (Brooks, Bobby Wood, John Peppard) – 3:47
  - featuring Trisha Yearwood
  - recorded on July 8, 2016, at Yankee Stadium, New York
6. "All Day Long (Garth Brooks song)" (Bryan Kennedy, Mitch Rossell, Garth Brooks) – 2:26
  - Appears on Legacy Collection only
  - recorded on October 20, 2018, in Notre Dame Stadium, South Bend, Indiana 2018
7. "Rodeo" (Larry Bastian) – 3:50
8. "Mom" (Wynn Varble, Don Sampson) – 2:56
9. "Papa Loved Mama" (Kim Williams, Brooks) – 3:03
10. "Guy Goin' Nowhere" (Ashley McBryde, Jeremy Bussey) – 3:39
  - recorded on November 11, 2017, at Spokane Arena, Spokane, Washington

Length: 36:26

==== Disc two ====
1. "Friends in Low Places (The Long Version)" (Earl "Bud" Lee, DeWayne Blackwell) – 7:16
  - recorded on September 8, 2016, at the Ryman Auditorium, Nashville
2. "Two of a Kind, Workin' on a Full House" (Dennis Robbins, Bobby Boyd, Warren Dale Haynes) – 2:46
3. "Unanswered Prayers" (Alger, Bastian, Brooks) – 3:51
  - recorded on January 28, 2017, at US Bank Arena, Cincinnati, Ohio
4. "People Loving People" (busbee, Lee Thomas Miller, Chris Wallin) – 4:07
  - recorded on July 8, 2016, at Yankee Stadium, New York
5. "Shameless" (Billy Joel) – 4:19
6. "Ain't Goin' Down ('Til the Sun Comes Up)" (Kent Blazy, Williams, Brooks) – 4:47
7. "Tacoma" (Caitlyn Smith, Bob DiPiero) – 3:38
  - recorded on October 22, 2017, at Pinnacle Bank Arena, Lincoln, Nebraska
8. "Standing Outside the Fire" (Jenny Yates, Brooks) – 4:30
  - recorded on July 8, 2016, at Yankee Stadium

Length: 35:23

==== Disc three ====
1. "Callin' Baton Rouge" (Dennis Linde) – 3:10
  - recorded on July 1, 2017, at Cajundome in Lafayette, Louisiana
2. "The River" (Victoria Shaw, Brooks) – 3:41
  - recorded on October 12, 2017, at Mercedes-Benz Stadium, Atlanta, Georgia
3. "The Beaches of Cheyenne" (Dan Roberts, Brooks) – 4:02
4. "The Fireman" (Mack Vickery, Wayne Kemp) – 2:52
  - recorded on November 4, 2017, at Tacoma Dome, Tacoma, Washington
5. "More Than a Memory" (Lee Brice, Kyle Jacobs, Billy Montana) – 3:19
6. "Two Piña Coladas" (Shawn Camp, Benita Hill, Sandy Mason) – 4:04
  - recorded on January 28, 2017, at US Bank Arena, Cincinnati, Ohio
7. "Whiskey to Wine" (Varble, B. Kennedy, Brooks) – 3:57
  - featuring Trisha Yearwood
  - recorded on September 8, 2016, at the Ryman Auditorium, Nashville
8. "We Shall Be Free" (Brooks, Stephanie Davis) – 3:01
9. "The Dance" (Tony Arata) – 5:52
  - recorded on December 22, 2017, at Bridgestone Arena, Nashville

Length: 34:13

=== Deluxe Edition ===
==== Disc one ====
1. "Friends in Low Places (The Long Version)" (Earl "Bud" Lee, DeWayne Blackwell) – 7:17
  - recorded on September 8, 2016, at the Ryman Auditorium, Nashville
2. "Two of a Kind, Workin' on a Full House" (Dennis Robbins, Bobby Boyd, Warren Dale Haynes) – 2:46
3. "Unanswered Prayers" (Alger, Bastian, Brooks) – 3:54
  - recorded on January 28, 2017, at US Bank Arena, Cincinnati, Ohio
4. "People Loving People" (busbee, Lee Thomas Miller, Chris Wallin) – 4:08
  - recorded on July 8, 2016, at Yankee Stadium, New York
5. "Much Too Young (To Feel This Damn Old)" (Randy Taylor, Garth Brooks) – 3:25
  - recorded at Mile High Stadium, Empower Field at Mile High Denver
6. "Shameless" (Billy Joel) – 4:18
7. "Ain't Goin' Down ('Til the Sun Comes Up)" (Kent Blazy, Williams, Brooks) – 4:46
8. "Tacoma" (Caitlyn Smith, Bob DiPiero) – 3:38
  - recorded on October 22, 2017, at Pinnacle Bank Arena, Lincoln, Nebraska
9. "Standing Outside the Fire" (Jenny Yates, Brooks) – 4:32
  - recorded on July 8, 2016, at Yankee Stadium

==== Disc two ====
1. "The Thunder Rolls" (Pat Alger, Garth Brooks) – 4:54
  - recorded on March 18, 2018, at Houston Livestock Show & Rodeo, Houston, Texas
2. "That Summer" (Alger, Sandy Mahl, Brooks) – 4:44
3. "Ask Me How I Know" (Mitch Rossell) – 3:32
4. "Fishin' in the Dark" (Wendy Waldman, Jim Photoglo) – 3:39
  - recorded on December 23, 2017, at Bridgestone Arena, Nashville, Tennessee
5. "In Another's Eyes" (Brooks, Bobby Wood, John Peppard) – 3:48
  - featuring Trisha Yearwood
  - recorded on July 8, 2016, at Yankee Stadium, New York
6. "Rodeo" (Larry Bastian) – 3:38
7. "All-American Kid" (Craig Campbell, Brice Long, Terry McBride) – 4:44
  - recorded at Ford Field, Detroit, Michigan
8. "Mom" (Wynn Varble, Don Sampson) – 2:58
9. "Papa Loved Mama" (Kim Williams, Brooks) – 3:03
10. "Guy Goin' Nowhere" (Ashley McBryde, Jeremy Bussey) – 3:39
  - recorded on November 11, 2017, at Spokane Arena, Spokane, Washington

==== Disc three ====
1. "Callin' Baton Rouge" (Dennis Linde) – 3:09
  - recorded on July 1, 2017, at Cajundome in Lafayette, Louisiana
2. "The River" (Victoria Shaw, Brooks) – 3:43
  - recorded on October 12, 2017, at Mercedes-Benz Stadium, Atlanta, Georgia
3. "The Beaches of Cheyenne" (Dan Roberts, Brooks) – 4:01
4. "The Fireman" (Mack Vickery, Wayne Kemp) – 2:54
  - recorded on November 4, 2017, at Tacoma Dome, Tacoma, Washington
5. "More Than a Memory" (Lee Brice, Kyle Jacobs, Billy Montana) – 3:24
6. "Dive Bar (the duet with Blake Shelton)" (Garth Brooks, Bryan Kennedy, Mitch Rossell) – 2:56
  - recorded at Albertsons Stadium, Boise, Idaho
7. "Two Piña Coladas" (Shawn Camp, Benita Hill, Sandy Mason) – 4:05
  - recorded on January 28, 2017, at US Bank Arena, Cincinnati, Ohio
8. "Cold Like That" (Steven Olsen, Chris Wallin, Melissa Peirce) – 3:23
  - recorded at Neyland Stadium, Knoxville, Tennessee
9. "Whiskey to Wine" (Varble, B. Kennedy, Brooks) – 3:58
  - featuring Trisha Yearwood
  - recorded on September 8, 2016, at the Ryman Auditorium, Nashville
10. "We Shall Be Free" (Brooks, Stephanie Davis) – 3:01
11. "The Dance" (Tony Arata) – 5:52
  - recorded on December 22, 2017, at Bridgestone Arena, Nashville

=== Legacy Collection Vinyl Edition ===
==== Album 1, side A ====
1. "The Thunder Rolls" (Pat Alger, Garth Brooks) – 4:54
  - recorded on March 18, 2018, at Houston Livestock Show & Rodeo, Houston, Texas
2. "That Summer" (Alger, Sandy Mahl, Brooks) – 4:48
3. "Ask Me How I Know" (Mitch Rossell) – 3:32
4. "Fishin' in the Dark" (Wendy Waldman, Jim Photoglo) – 3:38
  - recorded on December 23, 2017, at Bridgestone Arena, Nashville, Tennessee
5. "In Another's Eyes" (Brooks, Bobby Wood, John Peppard) – 3:47
  - featuring Trisha Yearwood
  - recorded on July 8, 2016, at Yankee Stadium, New York

==== Album 1, side B ====
1. "Rodeo" (Larry Bastian) – 3:50
2. "Mom" (Wynn Varble, Don Sampson) – 2:56
3. "Papa Loved Mama" (Kim Williams, Brooks) – 3:03
4. "Guy Goin' Nowhere" (Ashley McBryde, Jeremy Bussey) – 3:39
  - recorded on November 11, 2017, at Spokane Arena, Spokane, Washington

==== Album 2, side A ====
1. "Friends in Low Places (The Long Version)" (Earl "Bud" Lee, DeWayne Blackwell) – 7:16
  - recorded on September 8, 2016, at the Ryman Auditorium, Nashville
2. "Two of a Kind, Workin' on a Full House" (Dennis Robbins, Bobby Boyd, Warren Dale Haynes) – 2:46
3. "Unanswered Prayers" (Alger, Bastian, Brooks) – 3:51
  - recorded on January 28, 2017, at US Bank Arena, Cincinnati, Ohio
4. "People Loving People" (busbee, Lee Thomas Miller, Chris Wallin) – 4:07
  - recorded on July 8, 2016, at Yankee Stadium, New York

==== Album 2, side B ====
1. "Shameless" (Billy Joel) – 4:19
2. "Ain't Goin' Down ('Til the Sun Comes Up)" (Kent Blazy, Williams, Brooks) – 4:47
3. "Tacoma" (Caitlyn Smith, Bob DiPiero) – 3:38
  - recorded on October 22, 2017, at Pinnacle Bank Arena, Lincoln, Nebraska
4. "Standing Outside the Fire" (Jenny Yates, Brooks) – 4:30
  - recorded on July 8, 2016, at Yankee Stadium

==== Album 3, side A ====
1. "Callin' Baton Rouge" (Dennis Linde) – 3:10
  - recorded on July 1, 2017, at Cajundome in Lafayette, Louisiana
2. "The River" (Victoria Shaw, Brooks) – 3:41
  - recorded on October 12, 2017, at Mercedes-Benz Stadium, Atlanta, Georgia
3. "The Beaches of Cheyenne" (Dan Roberts, Brooks) – 4:02
4. "The Fireman" (Mack Vickery, Wayne Kemp) – 2:52
  - recorded on November 4, 2017, at Tacoma Dome, Tacoma, Washington
5. "More Than a Memory" (Lee Brice, Kyle Jacobs, Billy Montana) – 3:19

==== Album 3, side B ====
1. "Two Piña Coladas" (Shawn Camp, Benita Hill, Sandy Mason) – 4:04
  - recorded on January 28, 2017, at US Bank Arena, Cincinnati, Ohio
2. "Whiskey to Wine" (Varble, B. Kennedy, Brooks) – 3:57
  - featuring Trisha Yearwood
  - recorded on September 8, 2016, at the Ryman Auditorium, Nashville
3. "We Shall Be Free" (Brooks, Stephanie Davis) – 3:01
4. "The Dance" (Tony Arata) – 5:52
  - recorded on December 22, 2017, at Bridgestone Arena, Nashville

== Charts ==
=== Year-end charts ===
Year-end chart performance for Triple Live Deluxe
Chart (2021)	Position
US Top Country Albums (Billboard)	88

== Certifications ==
Certifications and sales for Triple Live
Region	Certification	Certified units/sales
United States (RIAA)	13× Platinum	4,333,329^{‡}
^{‡} Sales+streaming figures based on certification alone.
