= The Ultimate Collection (Garth Brooks album) =

Box set by Garth Brooks
- Released: November 11, 2016
- Recorded: 1987—2016
- Genre: Country
- Label: Pearl
- Producers: Allen Reynolds; Mark Miller

Garth Brooks chronology
Man Against Machine (2014)	The Ultimate Collection (2016)	Christmas Together (2016)

The Ultimate Collection is the fourth compilation box set by American country music singer-songwriter Garth Brooks, released by Pearl Records, through the distributor Target on November 11, 2016.

== Content ==
The Ultimate Collection includes nine discs of Brooks' previously released material with several previously unreleased tracks included. The set is arranged in thematic playlists, according to Brooks.

The collection's tenth disc is a Target-exclusive copy of Brooks's tenth studio album Gunslinger, with several Target exclusive tracks. "Baby, Let's Lay Down and Dance" was released as the first single from Gunslinger on October 13, 2016.

== Commercial performance ==
The box set sold 134,000 copies in the United States in the first week. However, due to its price per disc falling below Billboard's minimum required price, the box set was deemed ineligible to chart for its first four weeks on the Billboard 200. It was the top-selling album of the week, and would have ranked No. 2 on Billboard 200 if it had been eligible to chart. Brooks' Christmas album with his wife Trisha Yearwood, Christmas Together, was released in the same week and debuted at number 11 with 21,000 units.

It later debuted at number 13 on the Billboard 200 in the chart dated December 31, 2016, and number one on the Country Albums chart. The following week, it peaked at number 6 on the Billboard 200. The album has sold 554,200 copies in the United States as of December 2017.

== Track listing ==
Disc 1 – Old School
No.	Title	Writer(s)	Original Album	Length
1.	"Much Too Young (To Feel This Damn Old)"	Randy Taylor; Garth Brooks	Garth Brooks	2:58
2.	"If Tomorrow Never Comes"	Brooks; Kent Blazy	Garth Brooks	3:41
3.	"1982" (Originally by Randy Travis from his album Storms of Life)	Buddy Blackmon; Vip Vipperman	Unreleased track	3:07
4.	"Unwound" (Originally by George Strait from his album Strait Country)		Blame It All on My Roots (on Country Classics)	2:28
5.	"Longneck Bottle"		Sevens	2:17
6.	"Two of a Kind, Workin' on a Full House"		No Fences	2:33
7.	"Good Ol' Boys Like Me" (Originally by Don Williams from his album Portrait)		Blame It All on My Roots (on Country Classics)	4:15
8.	"Amos Moses" (Originally by Jerry Reed from his album Georgia Sunshine)		Blame It All on My Roots (on Country Classics)	2:55
9.	"That Ol' Wind"		Fresh Horses	5:20
10.	"Alabama Clay"	Larry Cordle; Ronny Scaife	Garth Brooks	3:38
11.	"White Lightning" (Originally by George Jones from his album White Lightning and Other Favorites)		Blame It All on My Roots (on Country Classics)	2:43
12.	"Don't Close Your Eyes" (Originally by Keith Whitley from his album Don't Close Your Eyes)		Blame It All on My Roots (on Country Classics)	4:36
Total length:				40:31

Disc 2 – Midnight Fire
No.	Title	Writer(s)	Original Album	Length
1.	"Shameless"	Billy Joel	Ropin' the Wind	4:19
2.	"The Red Strokes"		In Pieces	3:44
3.	"She's Every Woman"		Fresh Horses	2:53
4.	"What She's Doing Now"		Ropin' the Wind	3:26
5.	"In Another's Eyes" (Duet with Trisha Yearwood)		Sevens	3:33
6.	"One Night a Day"		In Pieces	4:15
7.	"A Friend to Me"		Sevens	3:05
8.	"Anonymous"		The Limited Series (on In Pieces)	2:55
9.	"Victim of the Game"		No Fences	3:06
10.	"Which One of Them"		The Limited Series (on Ropin' the Wind)	2:39
11.	"More Than a Memory"		The Ultimate Hits	3:22
12.	"To Make You Feel My Love"		The Limited Series (on Fresh Horses)	3:53
Total length:				41:10

Disc 3 – Cowboys
No.	Title	Original Album	Length
1.	"Good Ride Cowboy"	The Lost Sessions	3:26
2.	"Rodeo"	Ropin' the Wind	3:52
3.	"That Girl Is a Cowboy"	The Lost Sessions	4:23
4.	"Rodeo or Mexico"	Scarecrow	4:22
5.	"Night Rider's Lament"	The Chase	4:05
6.	"My Baby No Esta Aqui"	The Lost Sessions	2:49
7.	"Cowgirl's Saddle"	The Lost Sessions	3:20
8.	"Cowboy Bill"	Garth Brooks	4:28
9.	"Midnight Sun"	The Ultimate Hits	3:45
10.	"Rodeo and Juliet"	Man Against Machine	2:25
11.	"In Lonesome Dove"	Ropin' the Wind	4:48
12.	"The Cowboy Song"	In Pieces	3:59
Total length:			45:42

Disc 4 – The Road (disc 1)
No.	Title	Writer(s)	Original Album	Length
1.	"Standing Outside the Fire"	Garth Brooks; Jenny Yates	Double Live	3:43
2.	"Rodeo"	Larry Bastian	Double Live
3.	"Shameless"	Billy Joel	Double Live	3:55
4.	"If Tomorrow Never Comes"	Brooks; Blazy	Double Live	3:44
5.	"That Summer"	Alger; Sandy Mahl; Brooks	Double Live	4:42
6.	"In Another's Eyes" (Duet with Trisha Yearwood)	Brooks; Peppard; Wood	Unreleased track	4:09
7.	"Much Too Young (To Feel This Damn Old)"	Taylor; Brooks	Double Live	3:13
8.	"Unanswered Prayers"
9.	"Longneck Bottle"
10.	"One Night a Day"
11.	"To Make You Feel My Love"
12.	"Wrapped Up in You" (Featuring Keb' Mo')
13.	"The River"
14.	"American Pie" (Featuring Don McLean)

Disc 5 – The Road (disc 2)
No.	Title	Length
1.	"The Thunder Rolls" (Long version)
2.	"Two of a Kind, Workin' on a Full House"
3.	"Two Piña Coladas"
4.	"More Than a Memory"
5.	"Good Ride Cowboy"
6.	"Wild as the Wind" (Duet with Trisha Yearwood)
7.	"Workin' for a Livin'" (Duet with Huey Lewis in Los Angeles)
8.	"It's Your Song"
9.	"New York State of Mind" (Duet with Billy Joel)
10.	"Midnight Sun"
11.	"The Dance"

Disc 6 – Anthems
No.	Title	Original Album	Length
1.	"The Dance"	Garth Brooks	3:39
2.	"Standing Outside the Fire"	In Pieces	3:51
3.	"Unanswered Prayers"	No Fences	3:23
4.	"Thicker Than Blood"	Scarecrow	2:53
5.	"How You Ever Gonna Know"	Sevens	3:35
6.	"The Change"	Fresh Horses	4:05
7.	"Belleau Wood"	Sevens	3:28
8.	"People Loving People"	Man Against Machine	3:39
9.	"The River"	Ropin' the Wind	4:26
10.	"Mom"	Man Against Machine	4:03
11.	"Last Night I Had the Strangest Dream"	The Lost Sessions	3:31
12.	"When You Come Back to Me Again"	Scarecrow	4:44
Total length:			45:17

Disc 7 – The Covers
No.	Title	Writer(s)	Original Artist	Length
1.	"Against the Wind"	Bob Seger	Bob Seger & The Silver Bullet Band	4:48
2.	"Sweet Home Alabama"	Ed King; Gary Rossington; Ronnie Van Zant	Lynyrd Skynyrd	4:53
3.	"Don't Let the Sun Go Down on Me"	Elton John; Bernie Taupin	Elton John	5:42
4.	"Mrs. Robinson"	Paul Simon	Simon & Garfunkel	3:54
5.	"Midnight Train to Georgia"	Jim Weatherly	Gladys Knight & the Pips	4:10
6.	"(Sittin' On) The Dock of the Bay"	Steve Cropper; Otis Redding	Otis Redding	2:35
7.	"Hard Luck Woman" (With Kiss)	Paul Stanley	KISS	3:14
8.	"Who'll Stop the Rain"	John Fogerty	Creedence Clearwater Revival	2:42
9.	"Wild World"	Cat Stevens	Cat Stevens	2:25
10.	"All Right Now"	Andy Fraser; Paul Rodgers	Free	4:49
11.	"Drift Away"	Mentor Williams	Dobie Gray	4:02
12.	"Goodnight Saigon"	Billy Joel	Billy Joel	6:19
Total length:				49:33

Disc 8 – RPMs
No.	Title	Original Album	Length
1.	"Against the Grain"	Ropin' the Wind	2:22
2.	"She's Tired of Boys"	Man Against Machine	5:08
3.	"Rollin'"	Fresh Horses	4:07
4.	"Addicted to Love" (Originally by Robert Palmer from his album Riptide)	Blame It All on My Roots (on Classic Rock)	4:01
5.	"Cold Like That"	Man Against Machine	5:05
6.	"You Move Me"	Sevens	4:34
7.	"Ireland"	Fresh Horses	5:01
8.	"Don't Cross the River"	Scarecrow	4:05
9.	"I'll Be the Wind" (Featuring Martina McBride)	The Lost Sessions	4:04
10.	"Doctor My Eyes" (Originally by Jackson Browne from his album Jackson Browne)	Blame It All on My Roots (on Melting Pot)	2:50
11.	"Workin' for a Livin'" (Duet with Huey Lewis)	The Ultimate Hits	2:41
12.	"Do What You Gotta Do"	Sevens	2:57
Total length:			46:55

Disc 9 – Turn It Up
No.	Title	Original Album	Length
1.	"The Thunder Rolls"	No Fences	3:42
2.	"That Summer"	The Chase	4:45
3.	"You Wreck Me"	Man Against Machine	4:04
4.	"Why Ain't I Running"	Scarecrow	4:32
5.	"Wrapped Up in You"	Scarecrow	4:42
6.	"I'd Rather Have Nothing"	The Lost Sessions	3:44
7.	"Allison Miranda"	The Lost Sessions	5:03
8.	"Black Water" (Originally by The Doobie Brothers from their album What Were Once Vices Are Now Habits)	Blame It All on My Roots (on Melting Pot)	4:07
9.	"Midnight Train"	Man Against Machine	5:19
10.	"Dixie Chicken"	The Chase	4:25
11.	"Man Against Machine"	Man Against Machine	5:17
12.	"Two Piña Coladas"	Sevens	3:33
Total length:			53:13

Disc 10 – Gunslinger (Limited First Edition)
No.	Title	Length
1.	"Honky-Tonk Somewhere"
2.	"Weekend"
3.	"Ask Me How I Know"
4.	"Baby, Let's Lay Down and Dance"
5.	"He Really Loves You"
6.	"Whiskey to Wine"
7.	"Bang! Bang!"
8.	"Pure Adrenaline"
9.	"8teen"
10.	"SugarCane" (Target Exclusive)
11.	"Cowboys and Friends"
12.	"Friends in Low Places" (Target Exclusive; featuring George Strait, Jason Aldean, Florida Georgia Line, and Keith Urban)

== Charts ==
=== Weekly charts ===
Chart (2016)	Peak position
US Billboard 200	6
US Top Country Albums (Billboard)	1

=== Year-end charts ===
Chart (2017)	Position
US Billboard 200	147
US Top Country Albums (Billboard)	21
