= The Ultimate Hits =

Compilation album by Garth Brooks
- Released: November 6, 2007
- Genre: Country; country pop; pop rock
- Length: 2:03:25
- Label: Pearl
- Producer: Allen Reynolds

Garth Brooks chronology
| The Lost Sessions (2005) | The Ultimate Hits (2007) | Blame It All on My Roots: Five Decades of Influences (2013) |

Alternative Cover
- Limited Edition

Professional ratings
Review scores
| Source | Rating |
|---|---|
| AllMusic | 4.5/5 stars |

The Ultimate Hits is the third compilation album by American country music artist Garth Brooks, released by Pearl Records on November 6, 2007.

The 3-disc set, composed of two compact discs comprising 34 songs, four of which were new: "More Than a Memory", "Midnight Sun", and "Workin' for a Livin'", a duet with Huey Lewis, which were all released as singles, plus the bonus track "Leave a Light On"; as well as a DVD containing 33 music videos.

The album was also released in a special pink edition on October 15, 2007, with proceeds going to Susan G. Komen for the Cure. The Ultimate Hits was later certified 10× Platinum by the RIAA.

== Singles ==
The first single released from the album, "More Than a Memory", made US country chart history the week of September 15, 2007, when it debuted at No. 1, the first to do so. The other new singles were "Midnight Sun" (written by Brooks, Jerrod Niemann, and Richie Brown), and "Workin' for a Livin'", a duet with Huey Lewis, which peaked in the Top 20. The album's bonus track "Leave a Light On", written by Randy Goodrum and Tommy Sims, was the only new song not to be released as a single.

== Commercial performance ==
The album debuted at number three on the U.S. Billboard 200 chart, selling about 352,000 copies in its first week. Selling 204,000 copies, the album went to number one on the Top Country Albums chart in its second week. In its third week, The Ultimate Hits sold 192,000 bringing its three-week total to more than 748,000 albums sold. In the United Kingdom the album was also a hit, reaching No. 1 in the country music charts and the top 10 on the pop charts.

On January 18, 2008, the RIAA certified The Ultimate Hits Gold, Platinum & 5 times; Multi-platinum - denoting shipments of 2.5 million in the United States. On June 26, 2014, the RIAA certified it 7 times Multi-platinum, and on September 21, 2016, 10× Platinum for shipments of 5 million. It has sold 3.1 million copies in the US as of November 2017.

== Track listing ==
The Ultimate Hits - CD (Disc 1)
| No. | Title | Writer(s) | Producer(s) | Length |
|---|---|---|---|---|
| 1. | "Ain't Goin' Down ('Til the Sun Comes Up)" (from In Pieces, 1993) | Kent Blazy, Kim Williams, Garth Brooks | Allen Reynolds | 4:32 |
| 2. | "Friends in Low Places" (from No Fences, 1990) | Dewayne Blackwell, Earl Bud Lee | Reynolds | 4:18 |
| 3. | "Shameless" (from Ropin' the Wind, 1991) | Billy Joel | Reynolds | 4:01 |
| 4. | "Two of a Kind, Workin' on a Full House" (from No Fences, 1990) | Bobby Boyd, Warren Haynes, Dennis Robbins | Reynolds | 2:31 |
| 5. | "The Beaches of Cheyenne" (from Fresh Horses, 1995) | Dan Roberts, Bryan Kennedy, Brooks | Reynolds | 4:12 |
| 6. | "If Tomorrow Never Comes" (from Garth Brooks, 1989) | Blazy, Brooks | Reynolds | 3:37 |
| 7. | "Papa Loved Mama" (from Ropin' the Wind, 1991) | Williams, Brooks | Reynolds | 2:48 |
| 8. | "More Than a Memory" (previously unreleased) | Lee Brice, Kyle Jacobs, Billy Montana | Reynolds | 3:22 |
| 9. | "Good Ride Cowboy" (from The Lost Sessions, 2005) | Jerrod Niemann, Richie Brown, Kennedy, Bob Doyle | Reynolds | 3:26 |
| 10. | "In Another's Eyes" (Duet with Trisha Yearwood) (from Sevens, 1997) | Brooks, Bobby Wood, John Peppard | Reynolds | 3:33 |
| 11. | "The Fever" (from Fresh Horses, 1995) | Steven Tyler, Joe Perry, Roberts, Kennedy | Reynolds | 2:40 |
| 12. | "Midnight Sun" (previously unreleased) | Brooks, Jerrod Niemann, Richie Brown | Reynolds | 3:44 |
| 13. | "Learning to Live Again" (from The Chase, 1992) | Don Schlitz, Stephanie Davis | Reynolds | 4:04 |
| 14. | "Longneck Bottle" (featuring Steve Wariner; from Sevens, 1997) | Steve Wariner, Rick Carnes | Reynolds | 2:15 |
| 15. | "To Make You Feel My Love" (from Hope Floats: Music from the Motion Picture, 1998) | Bob Dylan | Reynolds | 3:55 |
| 16. | "We Shall Be Free" (from The Chase, 1992) | Davis, Brooks | Reynolds | 3:47 |
| 17. | "The Dance" (from Garth Brooks, 1989) | Tony Arata | Reynolds | 3:37 |

The Ultimate Hits - CD (Disc 2)
| No. | Title | Writer(s) | Producer(s) | Length |
|---|---|---|---|---|
| 1. | "Callin' Baton Rouge" (from In Pieces, 1993) | Dennis Linde | Reynolds | 2:35 |
| 2. | "Two Piña Coladas" (from Sevens, 1997) | Shawn Camp, Benita Hill, Sandy Mason | Reynolds | 3:34 |
| 3. | "The Thunder Rolls" (from No Fences, 1990) | Pat Alger, Brooks | Reynolds | 3:42 |
| 4. | "That Summer" (from The Chase, 1992) | Alger, Sandy Mahl, Brooks | Reynolds | 4:45 |
| 5. | "The River" (from Ropin' the Wind, 1991) | Victoria Shaw, Brooks | Reynolds | 4:23 |
| 6. | "Beer Run" (Duet with George Jones) (from Scarecrow, 2001) | Kim Williams, Amanda Williams, Keith Anderson, George Ducas, Blazy | Reynolds | 2:28 |
| 7. | "Unanswered Prayers" (from No Fences, 1990) | Alger, Larry Bastian, Brooks | Reynolds | 3:23 |
| 8. | "Much Too Young (To Feel This Damn Old)" (from Garth Brooks, 1989) | Randy Taylor, Brooks | Reynolds | 2:53 |
| 9. | "Workin' for a Livin'" (Duet with Huey Lewis) (previously unreleased) | Huey Lewis, Chris Hayes | Reynolds | 2:40 |
| 10. | "What She's Doing Now" (from Ropin' the Wind, 1991) | Alger, Brooks | Reynolds | 3:23 |
| 11. | "When You Come Back to Me Again" (from Frequency & Scarecrow, 2001) | Jenny Yates, Brooks | Reynolds | 4:44 |
| 12. | "Standing Outside the Fire" (from In Pieces, 1993) | Yates, Brooks | Reynolds | 3:51 |
| 13. | "American Honky-Tonk Bar Association" (from In Pieces, 1993) | Kennedy, Jim Rushing | Reynolds | 3:31 |
| 14. | "The Change" (from Fresh Horses, 1995) | Tony Arata, Wayne Tester | Reynolds | 4:06 |
| 15. | "Rodeo" (from Ropin' the Wind, 1991) | Larry Bastian | Reynolds | 3:51 |
| 16. | "Wrapped Up in You" (from Scarecrow, 2001) | Wayne Kirkpatrick | Reynolds | 4:31 |
| 17. | "Leave a Light On" (Bonus Track) (previously unreleased) | Randy Goodrum, Tommy Simms | Reynolds | 3:41 |

The Ultimate Hits - DVD
| No. | Title | Writer(s) | Director(s) | Length |
|---|---|---|---|---|
| 1. | "Much Too Young (To Feel This Damn Old)" | Randy Taylor, Garth Brooks | | 2:59 |
| 2. | "If Tomorrow Never Comes" | Kent Blazy, Brooks | John Lloyd Miller | 3:44 |
| 3. | "The Dance" | Tony Arata | Miller | 4:04 |
| 4. | "Friends in Low Places" | Dewayne Blackwell, Earl "Bud" Lee | | 8:54 |
| 5. | "Unanswered Prayers" | Pat Alger, Larry Bastian, Brooks | | 4:27 |
| 6. | "Two of a Kind, Workin' on a Full House" | Bobby Boyd, Warren Haynes, Dennis Robbins | | 2:38 |
| 7. | "The Thunder Rolls" | Alger, Brooks | Bud Schaetzle | 4:27 |
| 8. | "Rodeo" | Larry Bastian | | 3:55 |
| 9. | "Shameless" | Billy Joel | | 3:38 |
| 10. | "What She's Doing Now" | Alger, Brooks | | 3:40 |
| 11. | "Papa Loved Mama" | Kim Williams, Brooks | | 2:46 |
| 12. | "The River" | Victoria Shaw, Brooks | | 3:40 |
| 13. | "We Shall Be Free" | Stephanie Davis, Brooks | Timothy Miller | 3:40 |
| 14. | "Learning to Live Again" | Don Schlitz, Stephanie Davis | | 4:04 |
| 15. | "That Summer" | Alger, Sandy Mahl, Brooks | | 5:01 |
| 16. | "Ain't Goin' Down ('Til the Sun Comes Up)" | Blazy, Williams, Brooks | | 4:46 |
| 17. | "American Honky-Tonk Bar Association" | Kennedy, Jim Rushing | | 4:19 |
| 18. | "Standing Outside the Fire" | Jenny Yates, Brooks | Jon Small | 3:55 |
| 19. | "Callin' Baton Rouge" | Dennis Linde | Michael Salomon | 2:47 |
| 20. | "The Fever" | Steven Tyler, Joe Perry, Roberts, Kennedy | | 3:24 |
| 21. | "The Beaches of Cheyenne" | Dan Roberts, Bryan Kennedy, Brooks | | 3:43 |
| 22. | "The Change" | Tony Arata, Wayne Tester | Small | 3:40 |
| 23. | "In Another's Eyes" (Duet with Trisha Yearwood) | Brooks, Bobby Wood, John Peppard | Michael Salomon | 3:32 |
| 24. | "Longneck Bottle" (with special guest Steve Wariner) | Alger, Sandy Mahl, Brooks | | 3:33 |
| 25. | "Two Piña Coladas" | Shawn Camp, Benita Hill, Sandy Mason | | 3:12 |
| 26. | "To Make You Feel My Love" | Bob Dylan | | 3:55 |
| 27. | "When You Come Back to Me Again" (from Frequency) | Jenny Yates, Brooks | Gerry Wenner, Brooks | 4:38 |
| 28. | "Beer Run" (Duet with George Jones) | Williams, Amanda Williams, Keith Anderson, George Ducas, Blazy | | 2:40 |
| 29. | "Wrapped Up In You" | Wayne Kirkpatrick | Small | 5:27 |
| 30. | "Good Ride Cowboy" | Jerrod Niemann, Richie Brown, Kennedy, Bob Doyle | | 3:39 |
| 31. | "More Than a Memory" | Lee Brice, Kyle Jacobs, Billy Montana | | 3:39 |
| 32. | "Workin' for a Livin'" (Duet with Huey Lewis) | Huey Lewis, Chris Hayes | | 2:45 |
| 33. | "Midnight Sun" | Brooks, Jerrod Niemann, Richie Brown | | 4:37 |

== Charts ==
=== Weekly charts ===
| Chart (2007–08) | Peak position |
|---|---|
| Australian Albums (ARIA) | 11 |
| Australian Country Albums (ARIA) | 1 |
| Canadian Albums (Billboard) | 1 |
| Irish Albums (IRMA) | 2 |
| Norwegian Albums (VG-lista) | 1 |
| Scottish Albums (OCC) | 4 |
| UK Albums (OCC) | 10 |
| US Billboard 200 | 3 |
| US Top Country Albums (Billboard) | 1 |
| US Independent Albums (Billboard) | 1 |
| Chart (2014) | Peak position |
| Irish Albums (IRMA) | 1 |

=== Year-end charts ===
| Chart (2007) | Position |
|---|---|
| Australian Albums (ARIA) | 54 |
| US Billboard 200 | 145 |
| US Top Country Albums (Billboard) | 30 |

| Chart (2008) | Position |
|---|---|
| Canadian Albums (Billboard) | 19 |
| UK Album (OCC) | 152 |
| US Billboard 200 | 10 |
| US Top Country Albums (Billboard) | 4 |

| Chart (2009) | Position |
|---|---|
| US Top Country Albums (Billboard) | 46 |

| Chart (2017) | Position |
|---|---|
| US Billboard 200 | 198 |
| US Top Country Albums (Billboard) | 39 |

| Chart (2018) | Position |
|---|---|
| US Top Country Albums (Billboard) | 61 |

| Chart (2020) | Position |
|---|---|
| US Top Country Albums (Billboard) | 81 |

== Certifications and sales ==
| Region | Certification | Certified units/sales |
|---|---|---|
| Australia (ARIA) | Platinum | 70,000^{^} |
| Ireland (IRMA) | 6× Platinum | 90,000^{^} |
| Norway (IFPI Norway) | 2× Platinum | 80,000^{*} |
| United Kingdom (BPI) | Gold | 100,000^{^} |
| United States (RIAA) | Diamond | 3,333,333^{‡} |
^{*} Sales figures based on certification alone.^{^} Shipments figures based on certification alone.^{‡} Sales+streaming figures based on certification alone.
