= The Limited Series (1998 album) =

Box set by Garth Brooks
- Released: May 5, 1998
- Genre: Country
- Labels: Capitol Nashville, Pearl
- Producer: Allen Reynolds

Garth Brooks chronology
Sevens (1997)	The Limited Series (1998)	Double Live (1998)

Professional ratings
Review scores
Source	Rating
AllMusic	4.5/5 stars

The Limited Series is the first box set released by American country music artist Garth Brooks, released by Pearl Records on May 5, 1998.

The album debuted at #1 on the Billboard 200 chart and the Top Country Albums chart with 372,410 copies sold. It features re-issues of Brooks' first six albums, with a bonus track added to each. Sales in the United States were limited to two million copies.

With the release of The Limited Series, Brooks is the first artist to debut at No. 1 on two charts with a boxed set and set a record for first week sales of any boxed set in the Soundscan era.

Of the newly added tracks, "To Make You Feel My Love" (a cover of a Bob Dylan song from the Hope Floats soundtrack) reached No. 1 on the country charts in mid-1998. Additionally, "Something with a Ring to It" was previously recorded by Mark Collie on his 1990 debut album Hardin County Line.

== Commercial performance ==
The Limited Series debuted at No. 1 on the U.S. Billboard 200, becoming his sixth No. 1 album, and No. 1 on the Top Country Albums, becoming his eight No. 1 Country album.

== Track listing ==
=== Garth Brooks ===
1. "Not Counting You" (Garth Brooks)
2. "I've Got a Good Thing Going" (Larry Bastian, Sandy Mahl, Garth Brooks)
3. "If Tomorrow Never Comes" (Kent Blazy, Garth Brooks)
4. "Uptown Downhome Good Ol' Boy" (DeWayne Blackwell, Earl Bud Lee)^{1}
5. "Everytime That It Rains" (Charlie Stefl, Ty England, Garth Brooks)
6. "Alabama Clay" (Larry Cordle, Ronnie Scaife)
7. "Much Too Young (To Feel This Damn Old)" (Randy Taylor, Garth Brooks)
8. "Cowboy Bill" (Larry Bastian, Ed Berghoff)
9. "Nobody Gets Off in This Town" (Larry Bastian, DeWayne Blackwell)
10. "I Know One" (Jack Clement)
11. "The Dance" (Tony Arata)

=== No Fences ===
1. "The Thunder Rolls" (Pat Alger, Garth Brooks)
2. "New Way to Fly" (Kim Williams, Brooks)
3. "Two of a Kind, Workin' on a Full House" (Bobby Boyd, Warren Dale Haynes, Dennis Robbins)
4. "Victim of the Game" (Mark D. Sanders, Brooks)
5. "Friends in Low Places" (DeWayne Blackwell, Earl Bud Lee)
6. "This Ain't Tennessee" (Larry Bastian, James Shaw)^{1}
7. "Wild Horses" (Bill Shore, David Wills)
8. "Unanswered Prayers" (Alger, Larry Bastian, Brooks)
9. "Same Old Story" (Tony Arata)
10. "Mr. Blue" (Blackwell)
11. "Wolves" (Stephanie Davis)

=== Ropin' the Wind ===
1. "Against The Grain" (Bruce C. Bouton, Larry Cordle, Carl Jackson)
2. "Rodeo" (Larry Bastian)
3. "What She's Doing Now" (Pat Alger, Garth Brooks)
4. "Burning Bridges" (Stephanie C. Brown, Brooks)
5. "Which One of Them" (Brooks)^{1}
6. "Papa Loved Mama" (Kim Williams, Brooks)
7. "Shameless" (Billy Joel)
8. "Cold Shoulder" (Kent Blazy, Kim Williams, Brooks)
9. "We Bury The Hatchet" (Royal Wade Kimes, Brooks)
10. "In Lonesome Dove" (Cynthia Limbaugh, Brooks)
11. "The River" (Victoria Shaw, Brooks)

=== The Chase ===
1. "We Shall Be Free" - (Stephanie Davis, Garth Brooks)
2. "Somewhere Other Than the Night" (Kent Blazy, Brooks)
3. "Mr. Right" (Brooks)
4. "Every Now and Then" (Buddy Mundlock, Garth Brooks)
5. "Walkin' After Midnight" (Alan Block, Don Hecht)
6. "Dixie Chicken" (Lowell George, Martin Kibbee)
7. "Learning to Live Again" (Don Schlitz, Stephanie Davis)
8. "That Summer" (Pat Alger, Sandy Mahl-Brooks, Brooks)
9. "Something with a Ring to It" (Aaron Tippin, Mark Collie)^{1}
10. "Night Rider's Lament" (Michael Burton)
11. "Face to Face" (Tony Arata)

=== In Pieces ===
1. "Standing Outside The Fire" (Jenny Yates, Garth Brooks)
2. "The Night I Called the Old Man Out" (Pat Alger, Kim Williams, Brooks)
3. "American Honky-Tonk Bar Association" (Bryan Kennedy, Jim Rushing)
4. "One Night a Day" (Gary Burr, Pete Wasner)
5. "Kickin' And Screamin'" (Tony Arata)
6. "Anonymous" (Tony Arata, Jon Schwabe)^{1}
7. "Ain't Goin' Down ('Til The Sun Comes Up)" (Kent Blazy, Kim Williams, Brooks)
8. "The Red Strokes" (James Garver, Lisa Sanderson, Jenny Yates, Brooks)
9. "Callin' Baton Rouge" (Dennis Linde)
10. "The Night Will Only Know" (Stephanie Davis, Yates, Brooks)
11. "The Cowboy Song" (Roy Robinson)

=== Fresh Horses ===
1. "The Old Stuff" (Bryan Kennedy, Dan Roberts, Garth Brooks)
2. "Cowboys and Angels" (Kent Blazy, Kim Williams, Brooks)
3. "The Fever" (Steven Tyler, Joe Perry, Bryan Kennedy, Dan Roberts)
4. "That Ol' Wind" (Leigh Reynolds, Brooks)
5. "Rollin'" (Harley Allen, Reynolds, Brooks)
6. "The Change" (Tony Arata, Wayne Tester)
7. "The Beaches of Cheyenne" (Roberts, Kennedy, Brooks)
8. "To Make You Feel My Love" (Bob Dylan) ^{1}
9. "It's Midnight Cinderella" (Kim Williams, Kent Blazy, Brooks)
10. "She's Every Woman" (Victoria Shaw, Brooks)
11. "Ireland" (Stephanie Davis, Jenny Yates, Brooks)

^{1}Bonus track not included on original release of album.

== Charts ==
=== Weekly charts ===
Chart (1998)	Peak position
Canadian Albums (RPM)	7
Canadian Country Albums (RPM)	1
US Billboard 200	1
US Top Country Albums (Billboard)	1

=== Year-end charts ===
Chart (1998)	Position
US Billboard 200	44
US Top Country Albums (Billboard)	5
Chart (1999)	Position
US Top Country Albums (Billboard)	37

== Certifications ==
Region	Certification	Certified units/sales
Canada (Music Canada)	4× Platinum	400,000^{^}
Ireland (IRMA)	2× Platinum	30,000^{^}
^{^} Shipments figures based on certification alone.
