= Double Live (Garth Brooks album) =

Live album by Garth Brooks
- Released: November 17, 1998
- Recorded: 1996–1998
- Genres: Country; country rock; country pop
- Length: 47:08 (disc one); 53:03 (disc two)
- Label: Capitol Nashville
- Producer: Allen Reynolds

Garth Brooks chronology
The Limited Series (1998)	Double Live (1998)	Garth Brooks in... the Life of Chris Gaines (1999)

Professional ratings
Review scores
Source	Rating
AllMusic	2.5/5 stars
Entertainment Weekly	B−
The Rolling Stone Album Guide	2/5 stars

Double Live is the first live album by American country music singer Garth Brooks. It was released on November 17, 1998, and is a two-disc compilation of live songs, recorded during Brooks's 1996–1998 world tour.

The album sold 1,085,000 copies in its first week, setting the record for the highest first-week sales since Nielsen SoundScan began tracking sales, surpassing the 950,000 copies sold by Pearl Jam's Vs. in 1993, as well as the highest single week sales, surpassing the 1.06 million copies sold by The Bodyguard soundtrack over Christmas 1992. It became the first new best-selling live album in the US since Eric Clapton's Unplugged in 1992, and later became the best-selling live album in United States music history. It has been certified 25× Platinum by the RIAA (12.5 million shipped as it is a double album), and is the seventh most shipped album in the US. By 2012, it had sold 6,017,000 copies.

Double Live was re-released on September 5, 2014, as Double Live: 25th Anniversary Edition, exclusive to GhostTunes.

Double Live was again re-released on November 20, 2018, as part of the Garth Brooks Anthology Part III: Live book.

== Content ==
The song "Tearin' It Up (And Burnin' It Down)" was originally slated for Brooks's 1997 album Sevens, and "Wild as the Wind" was intended for a duets album with Trisha Yearwood.

== Album cover themes ==
The album was originally released November 17, 1998, with a commemorative cover. In each of the next six weeks, another commemorative cover was released, each themed with one of Brooks' live performances.

Variations released since the original issue include a First Edition cover, Reunion Arena '91, Texas Stadium '93, World Tour I, World Tour II, Central Park '97, Dublin '98, USS Enterprise '01, The Last Show, Off-Stage and, in 2014, the 25th Anniversary Edition was released including a new cover, additional bonus tracks and a DVD to promote the digital remaster and release of Brook's digital music via GhostTunes.

== Commercial performance ==
Double Live debuted at number 1 on the US Billboard 200, becoming Brooks' seventh, and number 1 on the Top Country Albums, Brooks' ninth number one Country album. In November 2023, Double Live was certified 23× Platinum by the RIAA.

== Track listing ==
=== Original release ===
Disc one
No.	Title	Writer(s)	Length
1.	"Callin' Baton Rouge"	Dennis Linde	2:58
2.	"Two of a Kind, Workin' on a Full House"	Warren Haynes; Dennis Robbins; Bobby Boyd	2:44
3.	"Shameless"	Billy Joel	3:55
4.	"Papa Loved Mama"	Williams; Garth Brooks	2:51
5.	"The Thunder Rolls" (The Long Version)	Pat Alger; Brooks	4:48
6.	"We Shall Be Free"	Stephanie Davis; Brooks	4:43
7.	"Unanswered Prayers"	Alger; Bastian; Brooks	3:41
8.	"Standing Outside the Fire"	Jenny Yates; Brooks	3:43
9.	"Longneck Bottle" (feat. Steve Wariner)	Carnes; Wariner	2:42
10.	"It's Your Song"	Pam Wolfe; Benita Hill	4:18
11.	"Much Too Young (To Feel This Damn Old)"	Randy Taylor; Brooks	3:12
12.	"The River"	Victoria Shaw; Brooks	3:48
13.	"Untitled track"		0:06
14.	"Tearin' It Up (And Burnin' It Down)"	Kent Blazy; Williams; Brooks	3:56

Disc two
No.	Title	Writer(s)	Length
1.	"Ain't Goin' Down ('Til the Sun Comes Up)"	Williams; Blazy; Brooks	4:45
2.	"Rodeo"	Bastian	3:44
3.	"The Beaches of Cheyenne"	Dan Roberts; Bryan Kennedy; Brooks	3:51
4.	"Two Piña Coladas"	Shawn Camp; Hill; Sandy Mason	4:38
5.	"Wild as the Wind" (featuring Trisha Yearwood)	Pete Wasner; Charles John Quarto	4:13
6.	"To Make You Feel My Love"	Bob Dylan	3:17
7.	"That Summer"	Alger; Sandy Mahl; Brooks	4:42
8.	"American Honky-Tonk Bar Association"	Kennedy; Jim Rushing	4:05
9.	"If Tomorrow Never Comes"	Blazy; Brooks	3:44
10.	"Fever"	Tyler; Perry; Kennedy; Roberts	3:40
11.	"Friends in Low Places" (The Long Version)	Bud "E" Lee; DeWayne Blackwell	8:56
12.	"The Dance"	Tony Arata	3:56
Total length:			45:46

=== 25th anniversary edition ===
Disc one
No.	Title	Writer(s)	Length
1.	"Callin' Baton Rouge"	Linde	2:58
2.	"Two of a Kind, Workin' on a Full House"	Haynes; Robbins; Boyd	2:44
3.	"Shameless"	Joel	3:55
4.	"Papa Loved Mama"	Williams; Brooks	2:51
5.	"More Than a Memory"	Brice; Montana; Jacobs	3:29
6.	"The Thunder Rolls" (The Long Version)	Alger; Brooks	4:48
7.	"We Shall Be Free"	Davis; Brooks	4:43
8.	"Unanswered Prayers"	Alger; Bastian; Brooks	3:41
9.	"Standing Outside the Fire"	Yates; Brooks	3:43
10.	"Longneck Bottle" (feat. Steve Wariner)	Carnes; Wariner	2:42
11.	"It's Your Song"	Wolfe; Hill	4:18
12.	"Much Too Young (To Feel This Damn Old)"	Taylor; Brooks	3:12
13.	"Workin' for a Livin'" (Duet with Huey Lewis)	Lewis; Hayes	3:22
14.	"The River"	Shaw; Brooks	3:48
15.	"Tearin' It Up (And Burnin' It Down)"	Blazy; Williams; Brooks	3:56

Disc two
No.	Title	Writer(s)	Length
1.	"Ain't Goin' Down ('Til the Sun Comes Up)"	Williams; Blazy; Brooks	4:45
2.	"Rodeo"	Bastian	3:44
3.	"The Beaches of Cheyenne"	Roberts; Kennedy; Brooks	3:51
4.	"Two Piña Coladas"	Camp; Hill; Mason	4:38
5.	"Wild as the Wind" (featuring Trisha Yearwood)	Wasner; Quarto	4:13
6.	"To Make You Feel My Love"	Dylan	3:17
7.	"That Summer"	Alger; Mahl; Brooks	4:42
8.	"American Honky-Tonk Bar Association"	Kennedy; Rushing	4:05
9.	"If Tomorrow Never Comes"	Blazy; Brooks	3:44
10.	"Fever"	Tyler; Perry; Kennedy; Roberts	3:40
11.	"Friends in Low Places" (The Long Version)	Lee; Blackwell	8:56
12.	"The Dance"	Arata	3:56
Total length:			56:17

== Personnel ==
Per liner notes included with the album's release.

=== Musicians ===
- Susan Ashton — backing vocals
- Bob Bailey — backing vocals, choir
- Bruce Bouton — pedal steel guitar
- Garth Brooks — vocals, acoustic guitar
- Mark Casstevens — acoustic guitar
- Lisa Cochran — choir
- Stephanie Davis — acoustic guitar, backing vocals
- Mike Elred — choir
- Ty England — acoustic guitar
- Béla Fleck — banjo
- David Gant — keyboards
- James Garver — electric guitar, backing vocals
- Mark Greenwood — bass guitar, backing vocals
- Vicki Hampton — backing vocals, choir
- Mark Ivey — choir
- Marabeth Jordan — choir
- Gordon Kennedy — electric guitar
- John Kinsch — electric guitar
- Chris Leuzinger — electric guitar
- Jimmy Mattingly — fiddle, mandolin, acoustic guitar
- Steve McClure — electric guitar, pedal steel guitar
- Donna McElroy — backing vocals
- Terry McMillan — harmonica
- Debbie Nims — acoustic guitar, mandolin, backing vocals
- Mike Palmer — drums
- Victoria Shaw — backing vocals
- Lisa Silver — choir
- Betsy Smittle — bass guitar
- Keith Urban — electric guitar
- Cindy Walker — choir
- Steve Wariner — acoustic guitar, backing vocals on "Longneck Bottle"
- Bergen White — choir
- Dennis Wilson — choir
- Bobby Wood — keyboards
- Trisha Yearwood — vocals on "Wild As The Wind", choir
- Nashville String Machine — string orchestra

=== Production ===
- Guy Charbonneau – engineer
- Carlos Grier – digital editing
- John Harris – engineer
- Joe Loesch - sound design
- Mark Miller – engineer, mixing engineer
- Denny Purcell – mastering engineer
- John Saylor – engineer
- Steve Smith – engineer

== Charts ==
=== Weekly charts ===
Chart (1998)	Peak position
Australian Albums (ARIA)	43
Canadian Albums (RPM)	1
Canadian Country Albums (RPM)	1
European Albums (Billboard)	66
Irish Albums (RPM)	3
Norwegian Albums (VG-lista)	15
Scottish Albums (Official Charts)	75
UK Albums (Official Charts)	57
US Billboard 200	1
US Top Country Albums (Billboard)	1

=== Year-end charts ===
Chart (1999)	Position
US Billboard 200	6
US Top Country Albums (Billboard)	2

Chart (2000)	Position
US Top Country Albums (Billboard)	28

Chart (2001)	Position
Canadian Country Albums (Nielsen SoundScan)	80

Chart (2002)	Position
Canadian Country Albums (Nielsen SoundScan)	89

=== Decade-end charts ===
Chart (1990–1999)	Position
US Billboard 200	50

=== Singles ===
"It's Your Song" was re-recorded in the studio and released as a single, peaking at #9 in late 1998. Two of the album's other tracks charted on the Billboard charts in 1998 from unsolicited airplay.

Year	Single	Peak chart positions		
Year	Single	US Country	US	CAN Country
1998	"It's Your Song"	9	62	5
1998	"Tearin' It Up (And Burnin' It Down)"	63	—	—
1998	"Wild as the Wind" (with Trisha Yearwood)	65	—	—

== Certifications ==
Region	Certification	Certified units/sales
Australia (ARIA)	Gold	35,000^{^}
Canada (Music Canada)	6× Platinum	600,000^{^}
Norway (IFPI Norway)	Gold	
United Kingdom (BPI)	Silver	60,000^{^}
United States (RIAA)	25× Platinum	12,500,000^{‡}
^{^} Shipments figures based on certification alone.^{‡} Sales+streaming figures based on certification alone.

== See also ==
- List of best-selling albums in the United States
