= The Chase (Garth Brooks album) =

1992 studio album by Garth Brooks

Studio album by Garth Brooks
- Released: September 14, 1992
- Studio: Jack's Tracks (Nashville, Tennessee)
- Genre: Country
- Length: 40:12
- Label: Liberty
- Producer: Allen Reynolds

Garth Brooks chronology
Beyond the Season (1992)	The Chase (1992)	In Pieces (1993)

Singles from The Chase
- 1. "We Shall Be Free" Released: August 31, 1992; 2. "Somewhere Other Than the Night" Released: October 12, 1992; 3. "Learning to Live Again" Released: January 25, 1993; 4. "That Summer" Released: April 26, 1993

Professional ratings
Review scores
Source	Rating
AllMusic	4/5 stars
Christgau's Consumer Guide	B+
Entertainment Weekly	B
Q	4/5 stars
The Rolling Stone Album Guide	3.5/5 stars

The Chase is the fourth studio album by American country music artist Garth Brooks. It was released on September 14, 1992, through Liberty Records and sold 403,000 copies in its first week, The Chase debuted at number one on the Billboard 200 chart and Top Country Albums chart and has been certified diamond by the RIAA. It was also successful internationally, reaching number one on the UK country albums chart and remained in the top ten for many months.

"Dixie Chicken" is a cover of the classic Little Feat song off of their 1973 album of the same name, while "Night Rider's Lament" is a classic cowboy song that had been previously recorded by Jerry Jeff Walker and Chris LeDoux.

== Background ==
Brooks commented on the album, saying:

"The Chase is definitely the most personal album I think I've ever been involved with. This is as much me as anybody has ever seen. It was recorded at a time in my life that was probably the most trying time of my life. Not the fact that it was a hard time for me, I was just going through a lot of things at this time. Probably the biggest thing was expecting the birth of our first child Taylor. Was also in the business for record re-negotiations, we were remodeling our house. And still trying to go through the biggest tour I'd ever been on since Ropin' The Wind was seeing the success that it was. No Fences seemed to still be doing very well. So we were gone another 250 to 300 days out of the year. So, when you hear this album or snippets from it, and you hear things that are more, probably socially oriented as far as concerns of the world. And some things that are a little bit darker. That's probably 'cause that's where I was at that time. It was a big moment for me. And I gotta say of all the albums I've ever done, this one has the best writing on it, and probably the one that I feel the strongest about. I'm very proud and I love this album."

== Commercial performance ==
The Chase debuted atop the US Billboard 200, becoming his second number-one album, and atop the Top Country Albums chart, becoming his third country chart-topping album. The album prevented Madonna's Erotica from taking the top spot. In 2020, The Chase was certified diamond by the RIAA.

== Track listing ==
No.	Title	Writer(s)	Length
1.	"We Shall Be Free"	Garth Brooks; Stephanie Davis	3:44
2.	"Somewhere Other Than the Night"	Brooks; Kent Blazy	3:11
3.	"Mr. Right"	Brooks	2:01
4.	"Every Now and Then"	Brooks; Buddy Mondlock	3:56
5.	"Walkin' After Midnight"	Alan Block; Don Hecht	2:33
6.	"Dixie Chicken"	Lowell George; Martin Kibbee	4:21
7.	"Learning to Live Again"	Davis; Don Schlitz	4:05
8.	"That Summer"	Brooks; Pat Alger; Sandy Mahl	4:46
9.	"Something with a Ring to It^{A}"	Aaron Tippin; Mark Collie	2:33
10.	"Night Rider's Lament"	Michael Burton	4:04
11.	"Face to Face"	Tony Arata	4:18
Total length:			36:59

^{A}This track was not on the original release of the album. It first appeared when the album was re-released as part of Brooks' first Limited Series box set collection, and has since been part of subsequent releases of the album.

== Personnel ==
=== Musicians ===
- Bruce Bouton – pedal steel guitar on "Somewhere Other Than the Night", "Mr. Right", "Walk-in' After Midnight", "Dixie Chicken", "Learning to Live Again", "That Summer" and "Night Rider's Lament"
- Garth Brooks – lead vocals; backing vocals on "Every Now and Then" and "Night Rider's Lament"
- Mark Casstevens – acoustic guitar
- Gary Chapman – backing vocals on "We Shall Be Free"
- Mike Chapman – bass guitar
- Johnny Cobb – backing vocals on "We Shall Be Free"
- Charles Cochran – string arrangements on "Somewhere Other Than the Night" and "Learning to Live Again"
- Rob Hajacos – fiddle on "Mr. Right", "Walkin' After Midnight", "Dixie Chicken", "Night Rider's Lament" and "Face to Face"
- Vicki Hampton – backing vocals on "We Shall Be Free" and "Dixie Chicken"
- Yvonne Hodges – backing vocals on "We Shall Be Free" and "Dixie Chicken"
- Chris Leuzinger – electric guitar
- Donna McElroy – backing vocals on "We Shall Be Free" and "Dixie Chicken"
- Debbie Nims – backing vocals on "We Shall Be Free"
- Denis Solee – clarinet on "Dixie Chicken"
- Milton Sledge – drums, percussion
- Howard Smith – backing vocals on "We Shall Be Free"
- Bobby Wood – keyboards; piano on "Mr. Right", "Walkin' After Midnight" and "Dixie Chicken"
- Trisha Yearwood – backing vocals on "Dixie Chicken", "That Summer" and "Night Rider's Lament"
- Nashville String Machine – string section on "Somewhere Other Than the Night" and "Learning to Live Again"

=== Production ===
- Allen Reynolds – producer
- Mark Miller – recording and mixing engineer
- Matt Allen – recording assistant
- Richard Aspinwall – recording and mix assistant
- Terry Palmer – recording assistant, technical supervisor
- Carlos Grier – digital editing
- Denny Purcell – mastering engineer

== Charts ==
=== Weekly charts ===
Chart (1992)	Peak position
Australian Albums (ARIA)	24
Canadian Albums (RPM)	6
Canadian Country Albums (RPM)	1
European Albums Chart	90
Finnish Albums (Suomen virallinen lista)	32
German Albums (Offizielle Top 100)	76
New Zealand Albums (RMNZ)	45
US Billboard 200	1
US Top Country Albums (Billboard)	1
Zimbabwean Albums Chart	9

=== Year-end charts ===
Chart (1992)	Position
US Billboard 200	21
US Top Country Albums (Billboard)	4

Chart (1993)	Position
US Billboard 200	9
US Top Country Albums (Billboard)	2

=== Decade-end charts ===
Chart (1990–1999)	Position
US Billboard 200	65

=== Singles ===
Year	Single	Peak positions	
Year	Single	US Country	CAN Country
1992	"We Shall Be Free"	12	12
1992	"Somewhere Other Than the Night"	1	1
1993	"Learning to Live Again"	2	5
1993	"That Summer"	1	1

=== Other charted songs ===
Year	Single	Peak positions
Year	Single	US Country
1993	"Dixie Chicken"	73

== Certifications ==
Region	Certification	Certified units/sales
Australia (ARIA)	Gold	35,000^{^}
Canada (Music Canada)	5× Platinum	500,000^{^}
United States (RIAA)	Diamond	10,000,000^{‡}
^{^} Shipments figures based on certification alone.^{‡} Sales+streaming figures based on certification alone.
