= Wild as the Wind =

Wild as the Wind may refer to:

- Wild as the Wind, a 1998 album recorded by Canadian country music singer Patricia Conroy
- "Wild as the Wind", a song by Garth Brooks from the album Double Live
