= No Fences =

Studio album by Garth Brooks
- Released: August 27, 1990
- Recorded: 1989–1990
- Studio: Jack's Tracks (Nashville, Tennessee)
- Genre: Country pop; neotraditional country
- Length: 34:32
- Label: Capitol Nashville
- Producer: Allen Reynolds

Garth Brooks chronology
Garth Brooks (1989)	No Fences (1990)	Ropin' the Wind (1991)

Singles from No Fences
- 1. "Friends in Low Places" Released: August 6, 1990; 2. "Unanswered Prayers" Released: October 12, 1990; 3. "Two of a Kind, Workin' on a Full House" Released: January 1991; 4. "The Thunder Rolls" Released: April 30, 1991; 5. "Wild Horses" Released: November 20, 2000

Professional ratings
Review scores
Source	Rating
About.com	4/5 stars
AllMusic	5/5 stars
Christgau's Consumer Guide	(2-star Honorable Mention)
Entertainment Weekly	A
The Rolling Stone Album Guide	4/5 stars

No Fences is the second studio album by country music artist Garth Brooks. It was released on August 27, 1990, and reached No. 1 on Billboard's Top Country Albums chart. The album also reached No. 3 on the Billboard 200. On the latter chart, it stayed in the top 40 for 126 weeks. No Fences remains Brooks' best-selling studio album to date with 18 million copies shipped in the US, and is the album that made him an international star. It was his first album issued in Europe (the original European release contained the four singles from his US debut as bonus tracks).

== Musical style and composition ==
No Fences has been described as a country pop and neotraditional country album, that expanded further on the pop elements of Brooks' self-titled debut album, and focused more on the fusion of the soft rock, arena rock, and hard rock styles of artists such as Dan Fogelberg, James Taylor, the Eagles, Journey, and Aerosmith, and traditional country artists such as George Strait. It is considered the turning point when Garth Brooks established and followed the "stadium country" country-pop sound that grew in popularity for the rest of the 1990s, departing the neo-traditionalist sound that he started with in his career.

== Singles ==
Some of Brooks' most famous songs appear on No Fences, including: "The Thunder Rolls" (CMA's 1991 Video of the Year), "Friends in Low Places" (Academy of Country Music's 1990 Single of the Year), "Unanswered Prayers" and "Two of a Kind, Workin' on a Full House". A cover version of The Fleetwoods' "Mr. Blue" appears on the album. The album itself was named Album of the Year by the ACM in 1990. It reached Number 1 on the British country music charts (earning Brooks his first gold album in that country) and remained charted for over five years.

The track "Victim of the Game" was later covered by Brooks's friend and future wife Trisha Yearwood for her 1991 eponymous debut album.

Brooks later re-recorded the track "Wild Horses", and released the new recording as a single in early 2001, reaching #7 on the country chart.

== 25th anniversary reissue ==
In September 2015, it was announced No Fences would be reissued later in the year to commemorate its 25-year release anniversary. The release would include a new version of "Friends in Low Places", featuring George Strait, Jason Aldean, Florida Georgia Line, and Keith Urban singing along with Brooks. The album release has since been delayed due to royalty disputes.

== Track listing ==
No.	Title	Writer(s)	Length
1.	"The Thunder Rolls"	Pat Alger; Garth Brooks	3:43
2.	"New Way to Fly"	Brooks; Kim Williams	3:55
3.	"Two of a Kind, Workin' on a Full House"	Bobby Boyd; Warren Haynes; Dennis Robbins	2:33
4.	"Victim of the Game"	Brooks; Mark D. Sanders	3:09
5.	"Friends in Low Places"	Dewayne Blackwell; Earl Bud Lee	4:18
6.	"Wild Horses"	Bill Shore; David Wills	3:12
7.	"Unanswered Prayers"	Alger; Larry Bastian; Brooks	3:26
8.	"Same Old Story"	Tony Arata	2:53
9.	"Mr. Blue"	Dewayne Blackwell	3:17
10.	"Wolves"	Stephanie Davis	4:06
Total length:			34:32

== Personnel ==
Credits adapted from the album liner notes.

- Pat Alger – acoustic guitar, backing vocals (track 5)
- Al "Shaggy" Barclay – backing vocals (track 5)
- Larry Bastian – backing vocals (track 5)
- Dewayne Blackwell – backing vocals (track 5)
- Bruce Bouton – pedal steel guitar, backing vocals (track 5)
- Tim Bowers – bass guitar, backing vocals (track 5)
- Garth Brooks – lead vocals, acoustic guitar; backing vocals (track 5)
- Sandy Brooks – backing vocals (track 5)
- Stephanie C. Brown – backing vocals (track 5)
- Mark Casstevens – acoustic guitar
- Mike Chapman – bass guitar, backing vocals (track 5)
- Johnny Christopher – acoustic guitar
- Bob Doyle – backing vocals (track 5)
- Ty England – acoustic guitar, backing vocals (track 5)
- The Englands (plus one) – backing vocals (track 5)
- Dave Gant – piano, keyboard, organ, fiddle, backing vocals (track 5)
- James Garver – electric guitar, backing vocals (track 5)
- Rob Hajacos – fiddle, backing vocals (track 5)
- Dan Heins – audio engineer, backing vocals (track 5)
- Wendy Johnson – backing vocals (track 7)
- Steve King – backing vocals (track 5)
- Earl of Bud Lee – backing vocals (track 5)
- Chris Leuzinger – electric guitar
- Pam "The Chick" Lewis – backing vocals (track 5)
- Steve McClure – electric guitar, pedal steel guitar
- David McVay – backing vocals (track 10)
- Edgar Meyer – double bass
- Mark Miller – recording engineer, mixing engineer
- Buddy Mondlock – backing vocals (track 5)
- Steve Morley – backing vocals (track 5)
- Jennifer O'Brien – backing vocals (track 7)
- Mike Palmer – drums, percussion, backing vocals (track 5)
- Brian Petree – backing vocals (track 5)
- Dale Pierce – backing vocals (track 5)
- Denny Purcell – mastering engineer
- Jim Rooney – backing vocals (track 5)
- Tami Rose – backing vocals (track 5)
- Lee Sartin – backing vocals (track 5)
- Bill Shore – backing vocals (track 5)
- Milton Sledge – drums
- Charlie Stefl – backing vocals (track 5)
- Scott Stem – backing vocals (track 5)
- Neil Thrasher – backing vocals (track 10)
- Stephen Tolman – backing vocals (track 10)
- Hurshel Wiginton – backing vocals (track 7)
- Kim Williams – backing vocals (track 5)
- Bobby Wood – piano, keyboards, organ, backing vocals (track 5)
- Curry Worsham – backing vocals (track 10)
- Curtis Young – backing vocals (track 7)
- Nashville String Machine – string orchestra

== Charts ==
=== Weekly charts ===
Chart (1990–1994)	Peak position
Australian Albums (ARIA)	11
Canadian Albums (RPM)	49
Canadian Country Albums (RPM)	2
European Albums Chart	69
Irish Albums (IRMA)	1
US Billboard 200	3
US Top Country Albums (Billboard)	1

=== Year-end charts ===
Chart (1990)	Position
US Top Country Albums (Billboard)	60
Chart (1991)	Position
US Billboard 200	2
US Top Country Albums (Billboard)	1
Chart (1992)	Position
US Billboard 200	6
US Top Country Albums (Billboard)	3
Chart (1993)	Position
US Billboard 200	47
US Top Country Albums (Billboard)	9
Chart (1994)	Position
Australian Albums (ARIA)	85
US Top Country Albums (Billboard)	21

=== Decade-end charts ===
Chart (1990–1999)	Position
US Billboard 200	4

== Certifications ==
Region	Certification	Certified units/sales
Australia (ARIA)	Platinum	70,000^{^}
Canada (Music Canada)	7× Platinum	700,000^{^}
Ireland (IRMA)	5× Platinum	75,000^{^}
United States (RIAA)	18× Platinum	18,000,000^{‡}
^{^} Shipments figures based on certification alone.^{‡} Sales+streaming figures based on certification alone.

== See also ==
- List of best-selling albums in the United States
