= Somewhere Other Than the Night =

Single by Garth Brooks

from the album The Chase
- B-side: "Mr. Right"
- Released: October 12, 1992
- Studio: Jack's Tracks (Nashville, Tennessee)
- Genre: Country
- Length: 3:11
- Label: Liberty 57824
- Songwriters: Kent Blazy, Garth Brooks
- Producer: Allen Reynolds

Garth Brooks singles chronology
"We Shall Be Free" (1992)	"Somewhere Other Than the Night" (1992)	"Learning to Live Again" (1993)

"Somewhere Other Than the Night" is a song co-written and recorded by American country music singer Garth Brooks that reached the top of the Billboard Hot Country Singles & Tracks (now Hot Country Songs) chart, returning him to the top ten after his previous single "We Shall Be Free" became his first release to stall outside it. It was released in October 1992 as the second single from his album The Chase and his fifteenth overall. The song was written by Brooks and Kent Blazy.

== Critical reception ==
Deborah Evans Price, of Billboard magazine reviewed the song favorably, calling it "a ballad to behold." She goes on to say that Brooks "powerfully and dramatically delivers a glimpse into one relationship and sets it out as an example."

== Chart performance ==
The song debuted at number 69 on the Hot Country Singles & Tracks chart dated October 17, 1992. It charted for 20 weeks, and reached number one on the chart dated January 16, 1993, where it remained for one week, giving Brooks his tenth Billboard Number One on that chart.

=== Charts ===
Chart (1992–1993)	Peak position
Canada Country Singles (RPM)	1
US Hot Country Songs (Billboard)	1

=== Year-end charts ===
Chart (1993)	Position
Canada Country Tracks (RPM)	36
US Country Songs (Billboard)	75
