= Learning to Live Again =

Single by Garth Brooks

from the album The Chase
- B-side: "Walkin' After Midnight"
- Released: January 25, 1993
- Studio: Jack's Tracks (Nashville, Tennessee)
- Genre: Country
- Length: 4:06 (album version)
- Label: Liberty 57894
- Songwriters: Don Schlitz, Stephanie Davis
- Producer: Allen Reynolds

Garth Brooks singles chronology
"Somewhere Other Than the Night" (1992)	"Learning to Live Again" (1993)	"That Summer" (1993)

"Learning to Live Again" is a song written by Don Schlitz and Stephanie Davis, and recorded by American country music singer Garth Brooks. It was released in January 1993 as the third single from his album, The Chase and his sixteenth overall. This song peaked at number 2 on the U.S. Hot Country Singles & Tracks (now Hot Country Songs) chart, and reached number 5 on Canada's RPM country chart. This song is included on The Ultimate Hits collection.

== Content ==
The song is a ballad, in which the narrator, a man with visible scars, describes his feelings of loneliness and isolation while expressing doubt about his capability to 'live again', date again. His friends then set him up on a double date at a little cafe. He feels very out of place but is getting along with his date. She asks him to dance but he's forgotten her name. The chorus describes how learning to live again as a single man is killing him. When they are saying goodnight on her porch, he kisses her on the cheek and gets the courage to ask if he can see her again. It is revealed that she is learning to live again also, but he doesn't know it. She says, "We'll See".

== Chart positions ==
"Learning to Live Again" debuted at number 48 on the U.S. Billboard Hot Country Singles & Tracks for the week of February 6, 1993.

Chart (1993)	Peak position
Canada Country Singles (RPM)	5
US Hot Country Songs (Billboard)	2

=== Year-end charts ===
Chart (1993)	Position
Canada Country Tracks (RPM)	79
US Country Songs (Billboard)	46
