= Unanswered Prayers =

Single by Garth Brooks

from the album No Fences
- B-side: "Alabama Clay"
- Released: October 12, 1990
- Recorded: Late 1989
- Studio: Jack's Tracks (Nashville, Tennessee)
- Genre: Country, Christian country
- Length: 3:23
- Label: Capitol Nashville 44650
- Songwriters: Pat Alger; Larry Bastian; Garth Brooks
- Producer: Allen Reynolds

Garth Brooks singles chronology
"Friends in Low Places" (1990)	"Unanswered Prayers" (1990)	"Two of a Kind, Workin' on a Full House" (1991)

"Unanswered Prayers" is a song by American country music artist Garth Brooks which hit No. 1 on Billboard's Hot Country Songs chart in 1991. It was released on October 12, 1990, as the second single from his album No Fences and also appears on The Hits, The Limited Series, Double Live and The Ultimate Hits. It was written by Brooks, Pat Alger and Larry Bastian.

The song is one of Brooks' most popular recordings, and is one of the key tracks that helped his No Fences album stay on the top of the charts for months (the album spent over 30 weeks at number 1 on Billboard's Country Charts). It also became his first single to be released outside of country radio, being sent to adult contemporary stations on November 12, 1990.

== Content ==
A man runs into his high school sweetheart at a football game in their hometown. As he introduces her to his wife, he reminisces about that past relationship and how he had once prayed so fervently that this girl would be his significant other forever. Both he and the ex-girlfriend, by this point, no longer see each other in the same way, as "time had changed" both of them, and neither can remember their relationship well. As he turns to his wife, he thanks God for not answering his original prayer, showing better judgement, and instead putting him with a better woman, whom he sees as one of the blessings in his life. The chorus advises the listener that, if God is not answering his or her prayers, that "just because He doesn't answer doesn't mean He don't (sic) care," and that unanswered prayers are "some of God's greatest gifts."

== Background and production ==
According to Brooks, the song is based on a true story:

Man, 'Unanswered Prayers' was a big part of my heart that went out on that record. A true life thing that happened to Sandy and myself. In October of '89, I saw my old high school flame. And I can say this now at the time I couldn't. For the first two years of my married life, I really thought the girl that was for me was still that girl that was in high school. And now man just the realization that what you have is the best for you, and the best you could ever do in your lifetime. It sure makes you sleep well at night.

Brooks provided the following background information on the song in the CD booklet liner notes from The Hits:

Pat Alger and I worked on this song quite a long time without a hook, without the line. We passed it by Larry Bastian and it was as if it was meant to be. Larry, his wife Myrna and I were taking a walk down 18th Avenue, and he looked at me and said, 'Oh, that's simple. This song should be called 'Unanswered Prayers' because some of God's greatest gifts are unanswered prayers.' This is probably the truest song I have ever been involved with as a writer. This actually happened to my wife and me when we went back home to Oklahoma. Every time I sing this song, it teaches me the same lesson... happiness isn't getting what you want, it is wanting what you've got.

== Chart positions ==
Chart (1990–1991)	Peak position
Canada Country Singles (RPM)	1
US Hot Country Songs (Billboard)	1

=== Year-end charts ===
Chart (1991)	Position
Canada Country Tracks (RPM)	32
US Country Songs (Billboard)	9

== Other versions ==
- Pat Alger, a co-writer of the song, recorded his own version of "Unanswered Prayers" in 1994. It was included as the closing track on his album Seeds.
- Singer Joey Sontz recorded "Unanswered Prayers" for his debut album Chasing The Dream in 2012.
- Ryan Kelly of Celtic Thunder recorded a cover of this song on Celtic Thunder's 2017 studio album Inspirational.

== Adaptations ==
A television film based on the song starring Eric Close and Samantha Mathis was broadcast on Lifetime TV in 2010.
