= We Shall Be Free =

Single by Garth Brooks

from the album The Chase
- B-side: "Night Rider's Lament"
- Released: August 31, 1992
- Recorded: 1992
- Studio: Jack's Tracks (Nashville, Tennessee)
- Genre: Country; pop rock; gospel
- Length: 3:48
- Label: Liberty 57794
- Songwriters: Garth Brooks; Stephanie Davis
- Producer: Allen Reynolds

Garth Brooks singles chronology
"Whatcha Gonna Do with a Cowboy" (1992)	"We Shall Be Free" (1992)	"Somewhere Other Than the Night" (1992)

"We Shall Be Free" is a song co-written and recorded by American country music artist Garth Brooks. It was released in August 1992 as the first single from his album The Chase and also appears on The Hits, The Limited Series, Double Live, and The Ultimate Hits. It reached #12 on the Billboard Hot Country Singles & Tracks in 1992, becoming his first single to miss the Top 10 on that chart due to an airplay ban from some radio stations. "We Shall Be Free" peaked at #22 on the Billboard Christian Songs charts through a marketing deal with Rick Hendrix Company, and earned Brooks a 1993 GLAAD Media Award. This song was written by Brooks and Stephanie Davis.

== Content ==
An ordinary man imagines a world where all human beings are free from earthly oppressions. Topics covered in this social commentary include: world hunger, freedom of speech, homelessness, homophobia, racism, and freedom of religion. Brooks would go on to perform this song on a 1996 episode of Muppets Tonight with The Muppets, at Equality Rocks, a gay rights march in Washington, D.C. in 2000, and at the We Are One Concert, a concert held at the Lincoln Memorial in Washington, D.C. during the Obama inaugural celebration in January, 2009.

== Background and production ==
According to Brooks, he was inspired to write this song after being in Los Angeles where the ACM Awards were being held during the 1992 L.A. Riots:

"The night the riots hit we watched it all on TV on the bus leaving LA. And as you drove out of LA you could see the buildings on fire. It was pretty scary for all of us, especially a bunch of guys from Oklahoma. Ya know this is intense out here."

Garth provided the following background information on the song in the CD booklet liner notes from The Hits:

"'We Shall Be Free' is definitely and easily the most controversial song I have ever done. A song of love, a song of tolerance from someone who claims not to be a prophet but just an ordinary man. I never thought there would be any problems with this song. Sometimes the roads we take do not turn out to be the roads we envisioned them to be. All I can say about 'We Shall Be Free" is that I will stand by every line of this song as long as I live. I am very proud of it. And I am very proud of Stephanie Davis, the writer. I hope you enjoy it and see it for what it was meant to be."

Garth provided additional information in the 2019 documentary "Garth Brooks: The Road I’m On":

Garth was scheduled to sing the National Anthem at the 1993 Super Bowl and had an agreement with NBC to play the video for "We Shall Be Free" immediately after. On the day of the Super Bowl NBC network executives told Garth that the song was too controversial and they weren't going to play it. Garth refused to sing unless the video was played and left the stadium. NBC caved and agreed to play the video.

== Music video ==
The music video for "We Shall Be Free" was directed by Timothy Miller, and premiered on CMT on January 26, 1993. The video ends with the text reading onscreen: This video is dedicated to the human spirit. Unbreakable. Relentless. Free. On January 31, 1993, Garth Brooks, who was scheduled to sing the national anthem, caused the first ever delay to the start of the Super Bowl when NBC refused to show the music video on air. He left the stadium about 45-minutes before his scheduled performance until the video was broadcast in its entirety. The music video for "We Shall Be Free" won Video of the Year at the 1993 Academy of Country Music awards. The video was edited and re-released in March of 2002 to now include scenes from the 9/11 attacks, and war footage.

=== Celebrities ===
In the introduction, numerous celebrities (including Brooks) are depicted in a matter of seconds and appear throughout the video. They include:

- Reba McEntire – country music artist
- Harry Belafonte – singer, actor, civil rights activist
- Michael W. Smith – Gospel singer
- Jay Leno – comedian, former host of The Tonight Show
- General Colin Powell – former Chairman, Joint Chiefs of Staff, later US Secretary of State
- Whoopi Goldberg – actress/comedian
- Amy Grant – Christian music artist
- Joan Rivers – comedian and host of The Joan Rivers Show
- Craig T. Nelson – actor, star of Coach
- John Elway – Broncos quarterback
- Boomer Esiason – Bengals quarterback
- Elizabeth Taylor – actress
- Warren Moon – Oilers quarterback
- Bernie Kosar – Cleveland Browns/Dallas Cowboys quarterback
- Eddie Murphy – actor and comedian
- Patrick Swayze – actor
- Kristi Yamaguchi – Olympic figure skating champion
- Burt Bacharach – pop music/jazz composer and artist
- Martina Navratilova – Czech tennis star
- Michael Bolton – pop music star
- Paula Abdul – pop music star
- Lily Tomlin – actress and comedian
- Julio Iglesias – Spanish singer
- Marlee Matlin – actress
- Mother Teresa – nun
- Martin Luther King Jr. – civil rights activist
- Rodney King
- Nelson Mandela

== Chart positions ==
Chart (1992)	Peak position
Canada Country Singles (RPM)	12
US Hot Country Songs (Billboard)	12
