= When You Come Back to Me Again =

Single by Garth Brooks

from the album Scarecrow
- Released: May 8, 2000
- Studio: Jack's Tracks (Nashville, Tennessee)
- Genre: Country; country pop
- Length: 4:44
- Label: Capitol Nashville
- Songwriters: Jenny Yates, Garth Brooks
- Producer: Allen Reynolds

Garth Brooks singles chronology
"Do What You Gotta Do" (2000)	"When You Come Back to Me Again" (2000)	"Katie Wants a Fast One" (2000)

"When You Come Back to Me Again" is a song co-written and recorded by American country music artist Garth Brooks. The other writer on the song was Jenny Yates. The song was recorded for the movie Frequency. Trisha Yearwood, who later became Brooks' wife, provides harmony vocals. The song reached number 21 on the U.S. Billboard Hot Country Singles & Tracks (now Hot Country Songs) charts and peaked at number 23 on the Canadian RPM Country Tracks chart. It was nominated for Best Original Song at the 58th Golden Globe Awards.

== Background and writing ==
The song is a ballad, penned, in part about Brooks' mother's death. He told Billboard magazine that the song is about lighthouses in his life. Brooks said, "that lighthouse is my mother, that lighthouse is also those people you played live to, that lighthouse is also the music because the music is like the air or the water, it simply is."

== Music video ==
The music video was co-directed by Gerry Wenner and Garth Brooks, and premiered on CMT on May 16, 2000. The video features clips from the movie Frequency, interwoven with Brooks singing against a black background, wearing all black, the view only being a face shot. The video begins and ends with a glow of light from a lighthouse panning out across the screen. Once in each end of the video a figure, presumably Garth, can be seen on the far right of the screen during one of the light movements.

== Chart performance ==
"When You Come Back to Me Again" debuted at number 59 on the U.S. Billboard Hot Country Singles & Tracks for the chart week of May 13, 2000.

Chart (2000)	Peak position
Canada Country Singles (RPM)	23
US Bubbling Under Hot 100 (Billboard)	5
US Adult Contemporary (Billboard)	29
US Hot Country Songs (Billboard)	21

=== Year-end charts ===
Chart (2000)	Position
US Country Songs (Billboard)	75

== Other versions ==
In 2014, Steve Lawrence released a version of this song after watching the movie Frequency about three times on cable. While sitting in the audience at a Garth Brooks show in Las Vegas, Lawrence requested the song from the audience at the end of a show, but Brooks couldn't see who had requested the song due to the arena spotlights.
