= That Summer (song) =

Single by Garth Brooks

from the album The Chase
- B-side: "Dixie Chicken"
- Released: April 26, 1993
- Recorded: 1992
- Studio: Jack's Tracks (Nashville, Tennessee)
- Genre: Country
- Length: 4:47
- Label: Liberty 17324
- Songwriters: Pat Alger; Garth Brooks; Sandy Mahl
- Producer: Allen Reynolds

Garth Brooks singles chronology
"Learning to Live Again" (1993)	"That Summer" (1993)	"Ain't Goin' Down ('Til the Sun Comes Up)" (1993)

"That Summer" is a song co-written and recorded by American country music artist Garth Brooks. It was released in April 1993 as the fourth and final single from his album The Chase and also appears on The Hits, The Ultimate Hits, The Limited Series and Double Live. It reached number-one on the Billboard Country Charts in 1993. The song was written by Brooks, Pat Alger, and Brooks' then-wife Sandy Mahl.

== Background and writing ==
On the 1996 television special, The Garth Brooks Story, Garth talks about writing the song:

"That Summer started out as a single guy and a married woman meeting at a party. The married woman being ignored by whom she was with, and they snuck off together. Allen Reynolds told me, "Man, I just don't find myself pulling for these characters. It doesn't seem innocently cool." I was thinking that he was right. Going home that night in the truck I started singing she has a need to feel the thunder. Sandy started helping me write the chorus and we got the chorus done. Probably one of the neat things that I love about That Summer is that I think the song is very sexy."

== Content ==
The song is about a teenage boy "far from home" who goes to work for a "lonely widowed woman hellbent to make it on her own". The woman apparently lives on a wheat farm ("wheat fields as far as I could see").

The apparently much older woman slowly takes a liking to the young boy, to the point where one night she dons a dress "she hadn't worn in quite a while"; it is then implied by the rest of the second verse that the teenage boy loses his virginity by having sex with the more than willing older woman.

The third verse takes the now-adult man back to the scene of his coming of age, having not seen the woman (who has presumably died by then) since long ago. Although the man has been with several other women by this point, he still experiences flashbacks to his experience with the older woman.

== Charts ==
"That Summer" debuted at number 54 on the U.S. Billboard Hot Country Singles & Tracks for the week of May 8, 1993.

Chart (1993)	Peak position
Canada Country Singles (RPM)	1
US Hot Country Songs (Billboard)	1

=== Year-end charts ===
Chart (1993)	Position
Canada Country Tracks (RPM)	34
US Country Songs (Billboard)	24

== See also ==
- Summer of '42
