= More Than a Memory =

Single by Garth Brooks

from the album The Ultimate Hits
- Written: 2002
- Released: August 27, 2007
- Recorded: June 5, 2007
- Genre: Country
- Length: 3:25
- Label: Big Machine; Pearl
- Songwriters: Lee Brice; Kyle Jacobs; Billy Montana
- Producer: Allen Reynolds

Garth Brooks singles chronology
"That Girl Is a Cowboy" (2006)	"More Than a Memory" (2007)	"Workin' for a Livin'" (2007)

"More Than a Memory" is a song written by Lee Brice, Billy Montana, and Kyle Jacobs and recorded by American country music artist Garth Brooks. It was released on August 27, 2007 as his 51st single and first single from his third compilation album The Ultimate Hits. The song peaked at number 53 on the Billboard Hot 100, and debuted at number one on the U.S. Billboard Hot Country Songs chart, the first song to do so in the chart's history, and becoming his first number one since "To Make You Feel My Love" in 1998.

== Content ==
"More Than a Memory" is a mid-tempo ballad, featuring accompaniment primarily from piano, pedal steel guitar, and a string section. In it, the male narrator describes his attempts to forget about a lover who has left him, by destroying anything that reminds him of her and drinking heavily. Despite his attempts to forget her, he still finds himself attempting to call her on the telephone, and tries to stay awake so as not to dream of her. He states that since he still thinks of her, she is "more than a memory", even though he has been told by others that he will forget about her.

== Chart performance ==
On the U.S. Billboard Hot Country Songs chart dated for September 15, 2007, "More Than a Memory" became the first song to debut at number one in the entire history of the chart, setting a new record for the highest debut on that chart, and beating the previous record set only one week earlier by Kenny Chesney's "Don't Blink", which debuted at number 16.

At the time of "More Than a Memory", the chart was based on radio airplay alone. Its chart debut was described by Billboard as "almost impossible", since most number one debuts on other singles charts (such as the Billboard Hot 100) are tabulated by sales, and not on radio airplay alone. Since airplay usually builds at a more gradual rate than record sales do, very high debuts are less likely to occur on airplay-only charts such as Hot Country Songs. As a result, "More Than a Memory"'s chart-topping debut was the only song to debut in the top 10 based on airplay alone until 2026 when Taylor Swift's "I Knew It, I Knew You" debuted at number 8 on Country Airplay. Seven years later, Craig Wayne Boyd's "My Baby's Got a Smile on Her Face" became the second song to debut at number one on Hot Country Songs, although by then, the methodology of the chat had changed to include downloads and streaming, along with radio play.

In addition to its chart-topping debut, the song was Brooks' first number one single on Billboard since "To Make You Feel My Love" in 1998 (see 1998 in country music), and was also his last number one single, until "Ask Me How I Know" hit number one on the Country Airplay chart in December 2017. After its debut week, "More Than a Memory" fell to number eight, and after slipping to number 10, it began to climb, eventually rebounding to number two for the chart weeks of December 8 and 15 before falling out of the top 10. The song spent a total of 20 weeks on Hot Country Songs. The song also debuted at number 73 on the Hot 100 for the chart week of September 15, 2007, peaking at number 53.

== Charts ==
=== Weekly charts ===
Chart (2007)	Peak position
US Hot Country Songs (Billboard)	1
US Billboard Hot 100	53
Canada Hot 100 (Billboard)	62

=== Year-end charts ===
Chart (2007)	Position
US Country Songs (Billboard)	43
