= Billy Montana =

American country music singer-songwriter (born 1959)

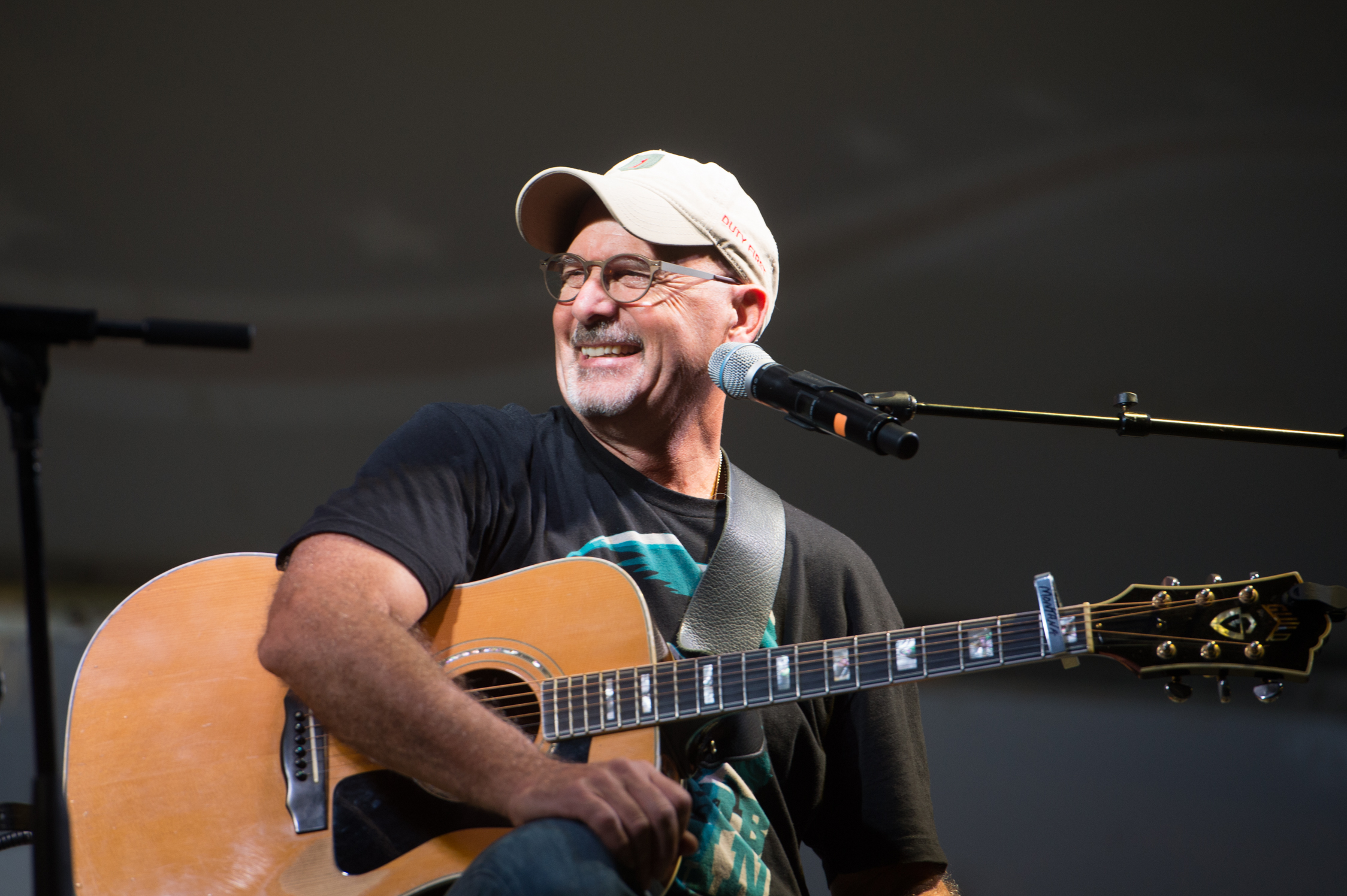

Background information
- Born: William Schlappi; September 28, 1959 (age 67)
- Origin: Voorheesville, New York, United States
- Genre: Country
- Occupation: Singer-songwriter
- Instruments: Vocals guitar bass
- Years active: 1987–present
- Labels: Warner Bros. Magnatone

Billy Montana (born William Schlappi on September 28, 1959, in Voorheesville, New York) is an American country music singer-songwriter. Between 1987 and 1995, Montana released one studio album and charted six singles on Billboard's Hot Country Singles & Tracks chart. As a songwriter, Montana's songs have been recorded by Lee Brice, Garth Brooks, Sara Evans, Jo Dee Messina, Tim McGraw, Martina McBride, Jon Pardi, Sister Hazel and Kenny Rogers, among others.

== Career ==
=== Singer ===
In the late 1980s, Montana and his brother, Kyle, formed a country music group with Bobby Kendall, Dave Flint and Doug Bernhard. Billy Montana & the Long Shots signed with Warner Bros. Records and charted three singles on Billboard's Hot Country Singles & Tracks chart before disbanding without releasing an album. Their highest charting single, "Baby I Was Leaving Anyhow," peaked at No. 40 in 1987. After the group disbanded, Montana moved to Nashville in 1989 to pursue his dream of songwriting.

In 1994, Magnatone Records signed Montana to a solo record deal. His debut album, No Yesterday, was released in April 1995. Three singles were released from the project and charted on Billboard's Hot Country Singles & Tracks, the highest of which peaked at No. 55. One of the album's tracks, "A Clean Mind and Dirty Hands," was named Song of the Year by Farm Journal in 1996 as the song best depicting genuine farm life.

=== Songwriter ===
Montana was signed to a songwriting deal with Moraine Music in 1994. He was picked up by Curb Publishing in a joint venture in 2000. The following year, Jo Dee Messina released Montana's "Bring On the Rain" as a single. The song topped Billboard's Hot Country Singles & Tracks in March 2002 and was nominated for a Grammy Award. Montana has since written No. 1 songs for Sara Evans ("Suds in the Bucket"), Lee Brice ("Hard to Love"), and Garth Brooks ("More Than a Memory"). "More Than a Memory" debuted at No. 1 on Billboard's Hot Country Songs chart in September 2007, becoming the first song in the chart's entire history to accomplish that feat.

=== Family ===
Billy Montana's son, Randy Montana, signed to Mercury Nashville in 2010. The younger Montana has reached Top 40 on the country music charts with "Ain't Much Left of Lovin' You" and "1,000 Faces".

== Discography ==
=== Albums ===
Title	Album details
No Yesterday	Release date: April 28, 1995; Label: Magnatone Records

=== Singles ===
Year	Single	Peak positions	Album
Year	Single	US Country	Album
1987	"Crazy Blue"^{A}	46	Singles only
1987	"Baby I Was Leaving Anyhow"^{A}	40	Singles only
1988	"Oh Jenny"^{A}	48	Singles only
1995	"Didn't Have You"	55	No Yesterday
1995	"Rain Through the Roof"	58	No Yesterday
1995	"No Yesterday"	70	No Yesterday

- ^{A}Credited to Billy Montana & the Long Shots.

=== Music videos ===
Year	Video
1995	"Didn't Have You"
1995	"Rain Through the Roof"
