= Kyle Jacobs (songwriter) =

American singer-songwriter (1973–2023)

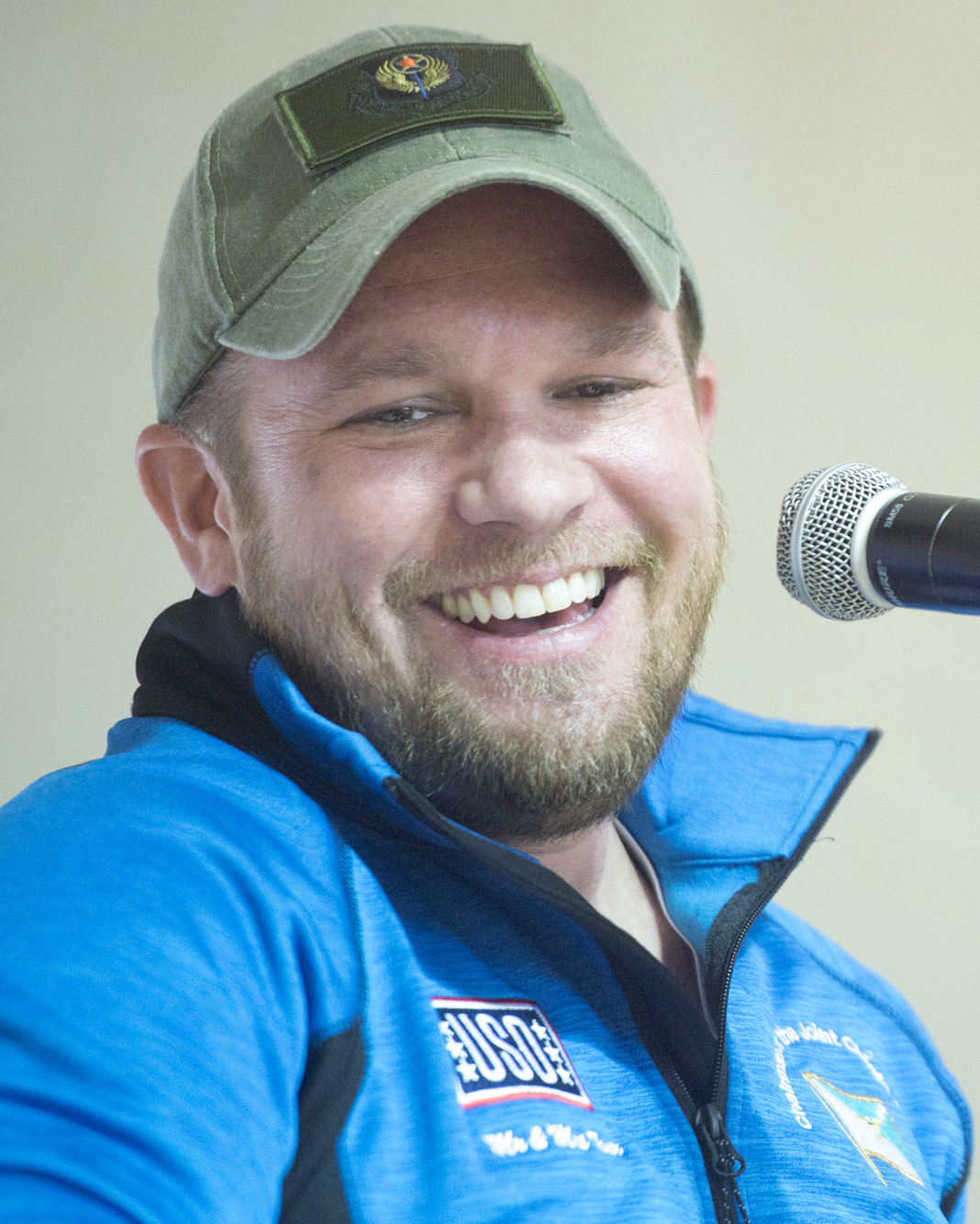
- Jacobs in 2016
- Born: June 26, 1973; Bloomington, Minnesota, U.S.
- Died: February 17, 2023 (aged 49); Nashville, Tennessee, U.S.
- Television: I Love Kellie Pickler
- Spouse: Kellie Pickler (m. 2011)

Kyle Christopher Jacobs (June 26, 1973 – February 17, 2023) was an American country music songwriter, vocalist, guitarist, pianist, as well as a staff writer for Curb Music from 2003 until his death. Jacobs wrote music on piano and guitar. His hometown was Bloomington, Minnesota.

Jacobs was the co-writer on Garth Brooks' single, "More Than a Memory", which became the first song to debut at number one on Billboard's Country Singles chart. In addition to sharing author rights of Kimberley Locke's Top 10 hit, "8th World Wonder", Jacobs's songs have been recorded by artists such as Trace Adkins, Jo Dee Messina, Craig Morgan, Tim McGraw, Kellie Pickler (his wife), Clay Walker, Kelly Clarkson, Scotty McCreery, and many others. Jacobs had also collaborated with top writers and artists, including Darius Rucker, Rachel Thibodeau, and Wynonna.

Jacobs starred alongside Kellie Pickler in the CMT reality series I Love Kellie Pickler.

== Personal life and death ==
Country music star Kellie Pickler announced her engagement to Jacobs, who proposed to her after two and a half years of dating, on June 15, 2010, her late grandmother's birthday, while on a beach at sunset. Pickler and Jacobs were married on January 1, 2011. Jacobs was also part of the founding of UTEC (United Teens Encounter Christ) in the Twin Cities area of Minnesota where he played in the music team.

Jacobs died from a self-inflicted gunshot wound to the Head in Nashville, Tennessee, on February 17, 2023 at age 49. A legal dispute was settled between his widow and his parents regarding Jacobs' possessions.
