= Tony Arata =

American singer-songwriter

Anthony Michael Arata (born October 10, 1957) is an American singer-songwriter. His best known song is "The Dance", a number-one U.S. country hit for Garth Brooks in 1990 which was nominated at the 33rd Grammy Awards for Best Country Song. He also wrote the 1994 No. 1 U.S. country hit "Dreaming with My Eyes Open" recorded by Clay Walker. Other artists who have recorded his songs include Suzy Bogguss, Lee Roy Parnell, Patty Loveless, Trisha Yearwood and Emmylou Harris. Arata was inducted into the Nashville Songwriters Hall of Fame in 2012.

Arata was born and grew up in Savannah, Georgia, attended the Georgia Southern University, and moved to Nashville in 1986. During that time, he released an album called Changes for MCA Records and Noble Vision.

He recorded for Noble Vision Records in 1984, charting two singles on the Hot Country Songs charts. He also released an album, The Change. In 2000, Arata released his album, Way Back Then. He released a further album Such Is Life, in 2005.

Other top-20 U.S. country hits written or co-written by Arata include "I'm Holding My Own", a No. 3 hit for Lee Roy Parnell in 1994, "Here I Am", a No. 4 hit for Patty Loveless, released in 1994, "The Man in the Mirror" (#17, Jim Glaser, 1983), and "The Change" (#19, Garth Brooks, 1995).

== Discography ==
=== Albums ===
Title	Album details
Changes	Release date: February 24, 1986; Label: MCA/Noble Vision Records
Way Back When	Release date: 2000; Label: Little Tybee
Such Is Life	Release date: October 8, 2005; Label: Little Tybee

=== Singles ===
Year	Single	Peak positions	Album
Year	Single	US Country	Album
1984	"Come On Home"	76	—N/a
1985	"Sure Thing"	65	—N/a
1986	"Same Old Story"	—	Changes
"—" denotes releases that did not chart

== Song Writing Catalog ==
Title	Written by	Notable releases	Release date	Chart peak
The Man In The Mirror	Tony Arata	Jim Glaser	1983	Billboard Hot Country #17
The Dance	Tony Arata	Garth Brooks	Apr 30, 1990	Billboard Hot Country #1
Same Old Story	Tony Arata	Tony Arata	February 10, 1986	
Same Old Story	Tony Arata	Garth Brooks	Aug 27, 1990 (No Fences Album)	
Same Old Story	Tony Arata	Ronna Reeves	1991 (Only The Heart Album)	
Same Old Story	Tony Arata	Tanya Tucker (Recorded Dec 2, 1987)	Oct 18, 1994 (Self-Titled Box Set)	
Face To Face	Tony Arata	Garth Brooks	Sep 14, 1992 (The Chase Album)	
Kickin' and Screamin'	Tony Arata	Garth Brooks	Aug 31, 1993 (In Pieces Album)	
Anonymous	Tony Arata, Jon Schwabe	Garth Brooks	Aug 31, 1993 (In Pieces Album)	
I'm Holding My Own	Tony Arata	Lee Roy Parnell	Jan 3, 1994	Billboard Hot Country #3
A Handful of Dust	Tony Arata	Michael James	Feb 15, 1994	
A Handful of Dust	Tony Arata	Patty Loveless	Aug 17, 1994	
A Handful of Dust	Tony Arata	Don Williams	Oct 27, 1998	
A Handful of Dust	Tony Arata	Dolly Parton, Linda Ronstadt, Emmylou Harris (Recorded 1993)	Sep 9, 2016 (Complete Trio Album)	
Dreaming with My Eyes Open	Tony Arata	Clay Walker	May 27, 1994	Billboard Hot Country #1
Here I Am	Tony Arata	Patty Loveless	Nov 12, 1994	Billboard Hot Country #4
What Else Can I Do	Tony Arata, Scott Miller	Patricia Conroy	Jan 1995	
The Change	Tony Arata, Wayne Tester	Garth Brooks	Mar 30, 1996	Billboard Hot Country #19
Satisfied Mind	Tony Arata	Hal Ketchum	May 7, 1996 (The Hits Album)	
Nothing but Love	Tony Arata	Patty Loveless	May 21, 1996 (Compilation Album)	
Nothing but Love	Tony Arata	Ty England	Mar 31, 2006 (Alive & Well Album)	
You Can't Get There From Here	Tony Arata	Lee Roy Parnell	Feb 18, 1997 (Every Night's... Album)	Billboard Hot Country #39
Long Stretch of Lonesome	Tony Arata, Gary Scruggs	Patty Loveless	Sep 30, 1997 (Album; title track)	
That's The Way I Remember It	Tony Arata, Tony Sims	Garth Brooks	Sep 28, 1999 (Chris Gaines Album)	
Why Ain't I Running	Tony Arata, Garth Brooks, Kent Blazy	Garth Brooks	Mar 8, 2003	Billboard Hot Country #24

== Awards and nominations ==
=== Grammy Awards ===
Year	Nominee / work	Award	Result
1991	"The Dance"	Best Country Song	Nominated

=== Academy of Country Music Awards ===
Year	Nominee / work	Award	Result
1991	"The Dance"	Song of the Year	Won

=== Country Music Association Awards ===
Year	Nominee / work	Award	Result
1991	"The Dance"	Song of the Year	Nominated

== Bibliography ==
- Barry McCloud (1995) Definitive Country: The Ultimate Encyclopedia of Country Music and Its Performers, p. 21-22, ISBN 0-399-52144-5 .
