= Rodeo (Garth Brooks song) =

Single by Garth Brooks

from the album Ropin' the Wind
- B-side: "New Way to Fly"
- Released: August 12, 1991
- Recorded: 1991
- Studio: Jack's Tracks (Nashville, Tennessee)
- Genre: Country
- Length: 3:53
- Label: Liberty
- Songwriter: Larry Bastian
- Producer: Allen Reynolds

Garth Brooks singles chronology
"The Thunder Rolls" (1991)	"Rodeo" (1991)	"Shameless" (1991)

"Rodeo" is a song written by Larry Bastian and recorded by American country music artist Garth Brooks. It was released in August 1991 as the first single from his album Ropin' the Wind. It peaked at number three on the U.S. country chart but reached number one on the Canadian country chart.

== Background and writing ==
Brooks provided the following background information on the song in the liner notes from The Hits:

"If one looks down the list of music's greatest writers of all time, I couldn't imagine the list being complete without the name of Larry Bastian. The song 'Rodeo' was originally titled 'Miss Rodeo.' It was a female song, where the artist sang about how she could not compete with the sport of rodeo. I tried to get every female I know in the industry to cut this song. When the last told me she just didn't hear it, I began to wonder if that meant I was supposed to do something with it. This song was recorded in 1981 as a demo, and for ten years, it sat silent. We got a hold of it, and the band's version of it just stunned me. This song has always been a favorite live, and I hope as long as I get to play live, this will always be on the list."

On the 1995 television special, "The Garth Brooks Story", Brooks said about the song:

"I went all over this town trying to get it cut. The song was called Miss Rodeo, and it was written for a woman to sing, and no one would sing it. I crawled on my knees to Trisha Yearwood, I said 'please you got to hear this song.' And she goes, 'Garth, I'm sure it's perfect, I don't understand the song because I'm not from that part of the country.' She's from Georgia."

Yearwood subsequently convinced Brooks that he was better fit to sing the song than she was, so he agreed to record it.

== Chart positions ==
Chart (1991)	Peak position
Canada Country Singles (RPM)	1
US Hot Country Songs (Billboard)	3

=== Year-end charts ===
Chart (1991)	Position
Canada Country Tracks (RPM)	4
US Country Songs (Billboard)	61
