= Kent Blazy =

American country music songwriter

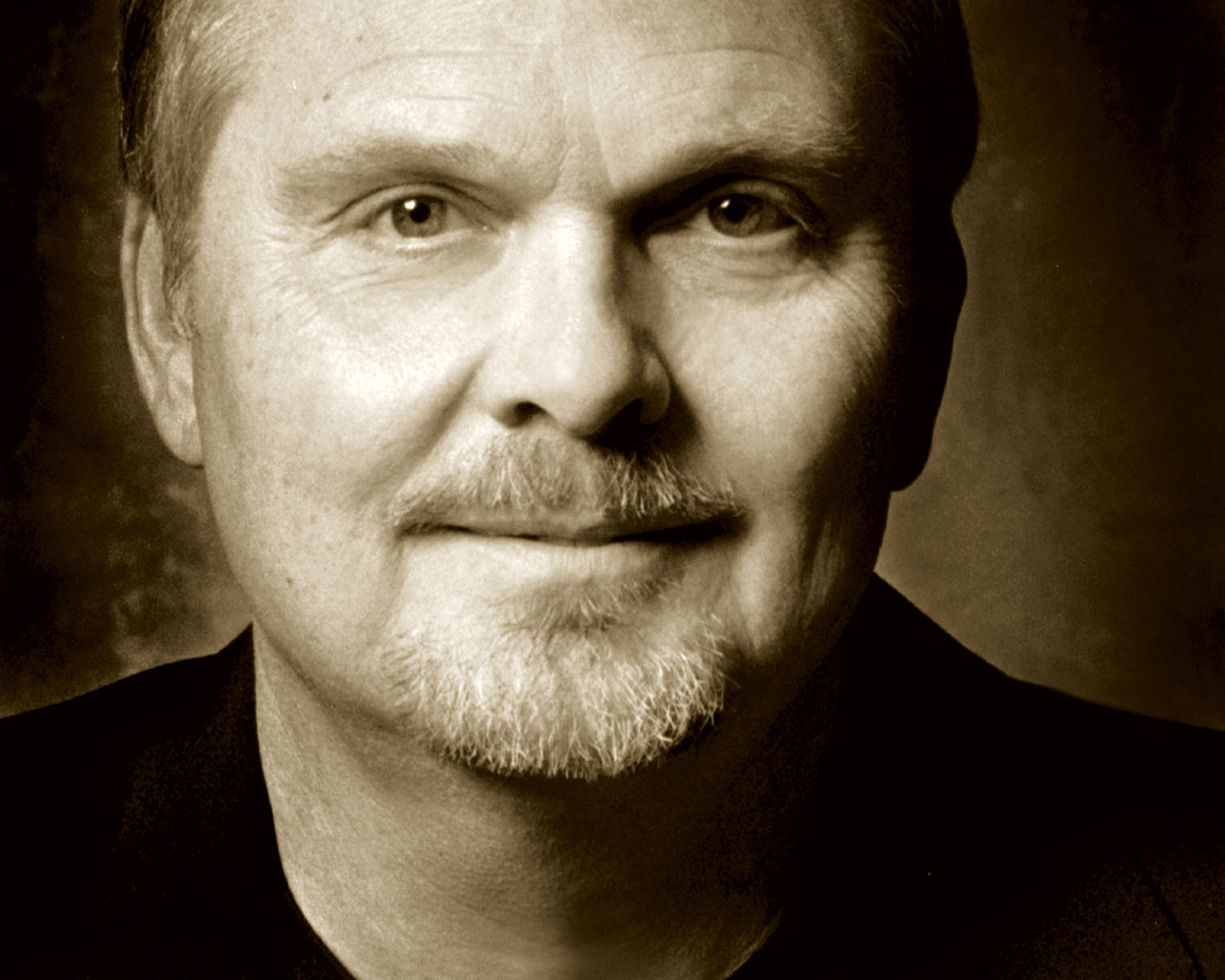

Background information
- Origin: Lexington, Kentucky, United States
- Genres: Country
- Occupation: Songwriter
- Years active: 1980s-present

Kent Blazy (born in Lexington, Kentucky) is an American country music songwriter. His credits include several singles for Garth Brooks (including Brooks' first number one hit, "If Tomorrow Never Comes"), as well as singles by Gary Morris, Diamond Rio, Patty Loveless and Chris Young. Blazy has a total of seven No. 1 hits to his credit.

== Biography ==
Kent Blazy was raised in Lexington, Kentucky. At an early age, he played rhythm guitar and sang in various local bands, citing The Byrds, Rodney Crowell and Joe Ely as influences. He later played for Canadian singer Ian Tyson. Later on, Blazy met former Exile member Mark Gray, who suggested that Blazy move to Nashville, Tennessee. Eventually, he signed to a publishing contract, but the publishing company closed; despite the loss of contract, Gary Morris sent Blazy's "Headed for a Heartache" into top 5 on the country charts.

By the late 1980s, Blazy met with a then-unknown Garth Brooks, who gave him the idea for a song entitled "If Tomorrow Never Comes." He and Brooks co-wrote the song, which went on to become Brooks' first number one hit. Brooks continued to record Blazy's material throughout the 1990s, including the singles "Ain't Goin' Down ('Til the Sun Comes Up)," "It's Midnight Cinderella", "She's Gonna Make It," "Somewhere Other Than the Night" and the George Jones duet "Beer Run (B Double E Double Are You In?)". He also co-wrote "That's What I Get for Lovin' You" by Diamond Rio and "Can't Get Enough" by Patty Loveless in the late 1990s.

Blazy, along with songwriters Pat Alger, Tony Arata and Kim Williams, recorded an album entitled A Songwriters' Tribute to Garth Brooks, which included their renditions of songs that they had written for Brooks. This album was released in 2001 via VFR Records. Other songs that Blazy has co-written include "You Can Let Go" by Crystal Shawanda and "Gettin' You Home (The Black Dress Song)" by Chris Young from 2008 and 2009 respectively, as well as American Idol season 8 finalist Danny Gokey's debut single "My Best Days Are Ahead of Me."
