= Dewayne Blackwell =

American songwriter (1936–2021)

Dewayne L. Blackwell (September 17, 1936 – May 23, 2021) was an American songwriter active since the 1950s. His songs include "Mr. Blue", a 1959 hit for the Fleetwoods; "I'm Gonna Hire a Wino to Decorate Our Home", a 1982 hit for David Frizzell; and "Friends in Low Places", a 1990 hit for Garth Brooks. His songs have been recorded by the Everly Brothers, Roy Orbison and Bobby Vinton. He also wrote the title song for the 1982 Clint Eastwood film Honkytonk Man. The song was performed by Marty Robbins.

Blackwell lived for a short time in Haines, Alaska, and also in Ajijic, Mexico for a few years.
