= The Thunder Rolls =

1991 single by Garth Brooks

Single by Garth Brooks

from the album No Fences
- B-side: "Wolves" (the Netherlands); "Victim of the Game" (U.S. 7-inch)
- Released: April 30, 1991
- Recorded: 1989–1990
- Studio: Jack's Tracks (Nashville, Tennessee)
- Genre: Country rock; country
- Length: 3:42
- Label: Capitol Nashville 44727
- Songwriters: Pat Alger; Garth Brooks
- Producer: Allen Reynolds

Garth Brooks singles chronology
| "Two of a Kind, Workin' on a Full House" (1991) | "The Thunder Rolls" (1991) | "Rodeo" (1991) |

"The Thunder Rolls" is a song co-written and recorded by American country music artist Garth Brooks. It was released in April 1991 as the fourth single from his album No Fences. The song became his sixth number one on the country chart. Co-writer Pat Alger plays acoustic guitar on the track.

The song was first recorded by Tanya Tucker, but it was shelved until 1995 when it appeared on her self-titled box set. Her version includes a fourth verse alluding to infidelity and husband murder. The shorter version of the song was covered by heavy metal band All That Remains on their 2017 album Madness.

== Writing and production ==
"The Thunder Rolls" was written by Garth Brooks and Pat Alger. The original idea was Brooks's, as he wanted to explore the concept of "thunder rolling inside of a marriage and outside at the same time". Almost immediately after hearing this hook, Alger grabbed a guitar and started playing what Brooks described as a "D-minor rolling thing."

The song was pitched to Tanya Tucker. Although she liked it, her producer asked for another verse, which was added by Brooks and Alger. The additional lyrics describe the wife reaching for her pistol to confront the cheating husband, with the narrator saying "tonight will be the last time she'll wonder where he's been." Tucker recorded this version in the late 1980s. Upon learning that the song had been given away, Brooks's producer Allen Reynolds was disappointed; he believed the song was one of the most powerful Brooks had written. Tucker ended up dropping the song from her album project, so Brooks decided to record it for his second album No Fences. Reynolds suggested that they leave off the fourth verse.

"The Thunder Rolls"
The lyrics depict a husband driving home in the rain after his infidelity. The sound effect of thunder was added by Garth Brooks and producer Allen Reynolds.

During the recording session, Brooks invited Alger to play on it. He was impressed with Alger's work during their writing session and thought his passion would translate well in the recording. Both musicians recorded the song live, with no overdubs and no second take. When they were finished, Brooks suggested that they should add the sound of thunder. Reynolds had that sound on hand from a previous recording session, so Brooks determined when the sound would be heard.

Garth wrote about the song in the CD booklet liner notes from The Hits: "There is no doubt that the toughest song in the GB catalog has to be 'The Thunder Rolls'. This song came out fighting the day it was released. Originally cut by Tanya Tucker in 1988, it was never put on an album. It came back to us in time for No Fences. My hat's off to Pat Alger, a great writer and friend, and to music itself, because only music could withstand what this song has gone through."

== Music video ==
Although the recording featured only the first three verses, Brooks often performed the fourth verse in concert, to the delight of his audience. When he began thinking about a music video for the song, Brooks chose to allude to the fourth verse by including the visual theme of domestic violence. This would tie together the two versions of the song. Brooks chose to play the central part of the philandering husband himself, so that he could "make sure [the character] was so despicable that the whole viewing audience wanted to shoot him."

Before the video's release, Cathy Gurley, the head of public relations at Capitol Nashville, arranged a screening for industry women. They unanimously endorsed the video, describing it as a powerful statement against domestic violence. The video was released to CMT and The Nashville Network (TNN), where CMT immediately named it a "Pick Hit." On May 1, the day after the video's release, TNN banned the video. CMT pulled it soon after, with a CMT representative commenting that the network was "in business to entertain, not to promote or condone gratuitous violence or social issues." TNN offered to resume airplay if Brooks would film a disclaimer for the end. Brooks looked at the TNN script but refused to film himself reading it, saying it felt as if he would be using the controversy to promote the video. Brooks told TNN they could add a disclaimer if they chose, but he was not going to compromise his vision.

Because the video had been pulled so quickly, few people had seen it. Radio stations, country bars, television stations and newspapers began requesting copies of the video so that they – and their audiences – could form their own opinions. Several radio stations in the United States screened the video at quickly organized fundraisers for local battered women's shelters. Capitol Records was contacted numerous times by women's shelters, thanking the company for raising awareness of domestic violence. Six days after TNN banned the video, pop channel VH-1 announced that they would begin playing "The Thunder Rolls."

The following month, Capitol Nashville president Jimmy Bowen sent copies of the video to members of the Country Music Association, so that they could consider it for the upcoming annual awards show. On October 2, the video was awarded the CMA Video of the Year award.

At the 1991 Grammy Awards, the music video, directed by Bud Schaetzle and produced by Martin J. Fischer, was nominated for "Best Music Video – Short Form".

== Track listing ==
U.S. 7-inch single Capitol Nashville NR-44727, 1991

1. "The Thunder Rolls" (edited) – 3:30
2. "Victim of the Game"

Jukebox 7-inch single Liberty S7-57744-A, 1992

1. "The Thunder Rolls" – 3:42
2. "Shameless"

Dutch promo CD single Liberty/EMI promo CX 519443, 1991

1. "The Thunder Rolls" – 3:43

== Chart positions ==
"The Thunder Rolls" debuted at number 19 on the U.S. Billboard Hot Country Singles & Tracks for the week of May 18, 1991.

| Chart (1991) | Peak position |
|---|---|
| Canada Country Singles (RPM) | 1 |
| US Hot Country Songs (Billboard) | 1 |

=== Year-end charts ===
| Chart (1991) | Position |
|---|---|
| Canada Country Tracks (RPM) | 1 |
| US Country Songs (Billboard) | 4 |

== All That Remains cover version ==
"The Thunder Rolls"

Single by All That Remains

from the album Madness
- Released: August 22, 2017
- Studio: West Valley Studios, Woodland Hills, California
- Genre: Alternative metal
- Length: 4:22
- Label: Razor & Tie (North America); Eleven Seven (Europe)
- Songwriters: Pat Alger; Garth Brooks
- Producer: Howard Benson

All That Remains singles chronology
| "Louder" (2017) | "The Thunder Rolls" (2017) | "Fuck Love" (2018) |

Music video
- "The Thunder Rolls" on YouTube

Heavy metal band All That Remains released a cover of The Thunder Rolls on August 22, 2017, from their album Madness. According to lead vocalist Phil Labonte, the band was pushing their boundaries: "Our core audience likes a lot of diverse styles of music and gets it, and I think there's enough stuff on it for people that haven't heard All That Remains before to be kind of lured in. That's always our point: how can we reach out to new people?" All That Remains' cover features Labonte's vocals being layered to create an ethereal effect along with female backing vocals by Diamante Azzura.

The band notably performed an acoustic version of the cover at the studios of KAZR, an alternative rock radio station in Des Moines, Iowa.

=== Reception ===
Taste of Country praised the cover commenting that All That Remains honors the song's dark nature with intense electric guitars and drums, coupled with Labonte's haunting vocals. The cover is also notable for containing a signature heavy metal scream on the song's title. Markos Papadatos of Didgital Journal stated that it’s an "impressive rendition" of the song and gave it an A rating.

=== Music video ===
The music video for the cover mostly consists of clips of the band performing the song in the studio. Throughout the video there are also sort clips that intertwine between the studio clips, of dark clouds, wild horses galloping along with a woman burning a photo of man with a candle. When asked about the video Labonte told Billboard "we didn’t want it to be too much like the original, but the specificity of the song limits it to what you can do."

The music video put All That Remains at No. 1 among trending Vevo metal artists at the time, in addition to ranking high on Soundscan.

=== Chart positions ===
| Chart (2017) | Peak position |
|---|---|
| US Billboard Hot Rock Songs | 26 |
| US Billboard Mainstream Rock | 23 |

=== Certifications ===
| Region | Certification | Certified units/sales |
|---|---|---|
| United States (RIAA) | Gold | 500,000^{‡} |
^{‡} Sales+streaming figures based on certification alone.

== Sources ==
- Cox, Patsi Bale (2009), The Garth Factor: The Career Behind Country's Big Boom, Center Street, ISBN 978-1-59995-099-0
