= Kim Williams (songwriter) =

American songwriter

Kim Edwin Williams (June 28, 1947 – February 11, 2016) was an American songwriter who wrote hits for Randy Travis, Joe Diffie, Reba McEntire, Garth Brooks and many others. Williams was named ASCAP's Country Songwriter of the Year in 1994, won the Country Music Association's Song of the Year award (for "Three Wooden Crosses") in 2003, and was inducted into the Nashville Songwriters Hall of Fame in 2012.

== Songs written by Kim Williams ==
| Year | Title | Artist(s) |
|---|---|---|
| 1991 | "If The Devil Danced (In Empty Pockets)" | Joe Diffie |
| 1992 | "Papa Loved Mama" | Garth Brooks |
| | "Warning Labels" | Doug Stone |
| 1993 | "Ain't Goin' Down ('Til The Sun Comes Up)" | Garth Brooks |
| | "My Blue Angel" | Aaron Tippin |
| | "Haunted Heart" | Sammy Kershaw |
| 1995 | "The Heart Is A Lonely Hunter" | Reba McEntire |
| | "Who Needs You Baby" | Clay Walker |
| | "Not Enough Hours in the Night" | Doug Supernaw |
| | "Fall In Love" | Kenny Chesney |
| 1997 | "She's Gonna Make It" | Garth Brooks |
| | "Honky Tonk Truth" | Brooks & Dunn |
| 2001 | "While You Loved Me" | Rascal Flatts |
| | "Beer Run" | George Jones and Garth Brooks |
| 2002 | "Three Wooden Crosses" | Randy Travis |
| 2004 | "Pickin' Wildflowers" | Keith Anderson |
