= Stephanie Davis (singer) =

American singer-songwriter

- Origin: Bridger, Montana, U.S.
- Genre: Country
- Occupation: Singer-songwriter
- Instruments: Vocals, guitar
- Years active: 1993–present
- Labels: Asylum, Recluse

Stephanie Davis is an American country music singer and songwriter. She has written songs for Shelby Lynne, Garth Brooks, Waylon Jennings and Martina McBride. In addition, Davis has released five studio albums: a self-titled debut on Asylum Records in 1993, followed by four self-released albums. Her self-titled debut produced a chart single in "It's All in the Heart".

== Biography ==
Stephanie Davis was born and raised in Bridger, Montana. She later moved to Tennessee, where she worked as a songwriter, with cuts by Shelby Lynne, and Martina McBride. Garth Brooks also recorded several of her songs, including "The Gift", "Wolves", "We Shall Be Free" (a top 20 single), "Learning to Live Again" (a top 5 success), "The Night Will Only Know", and "We Belong to Each Other". Brooks also signed her as an opening act in 1993, and she also joined his road band. She can be seen performing with Brooks' band during the concerts in Dublin at Croke Park and in New York at Central Park.

She released an album for Asylum Records in late 1993. This album produced the single "It's All in the Heart", which spent two weeks on the Billboard Hot Country Singles & Tracks (now Hot Country Songs) charts in 1993, peaking at No. 72. She moved back to Montana and began recording albums on Recluse Records, a label that she founded herself. These albums were 1996's I'm Pulling Through, 1998's River of No Return, 2004's Crocus in the Snow, and 2004's Home for the Holidays, a Christmas album.

In 2009, she released two more albums on Recluse, Western Bliss and Western Bling. These albums were released simultaneously and only contain one original composition.

== Discography ==
=== Albums ===
Title	Album details
Stephanie Davis	Release date: August 24, 1993; Label: Asylum Records
I'm Pullin' Through	Release date: 1996; Label: Recluse Records
River of No Return	Release date: 1998; Label: Recluse Records
Crocus in the Snow	Release date: 2003; Label: Recluse Records
Home for the Holidays	Release date: 2005; Label: Recluse Records
Western Bliss	Release date: May 1, 2009; Label: Recluse Records
Western Bling	Release date: May 1, 2009; Label: Recluse Records

=== Singles ===
Year	Single	Peak positions	Album
Year	Single	US Country	Album
1993	"It's All in the Heart"	72	Stephanie Davis
1996	"Takin' a Chance on Love"	—	I'm Pulling Through
"—" denotes releases that did not chart
