= Pat Alger =

American singer-songwriter

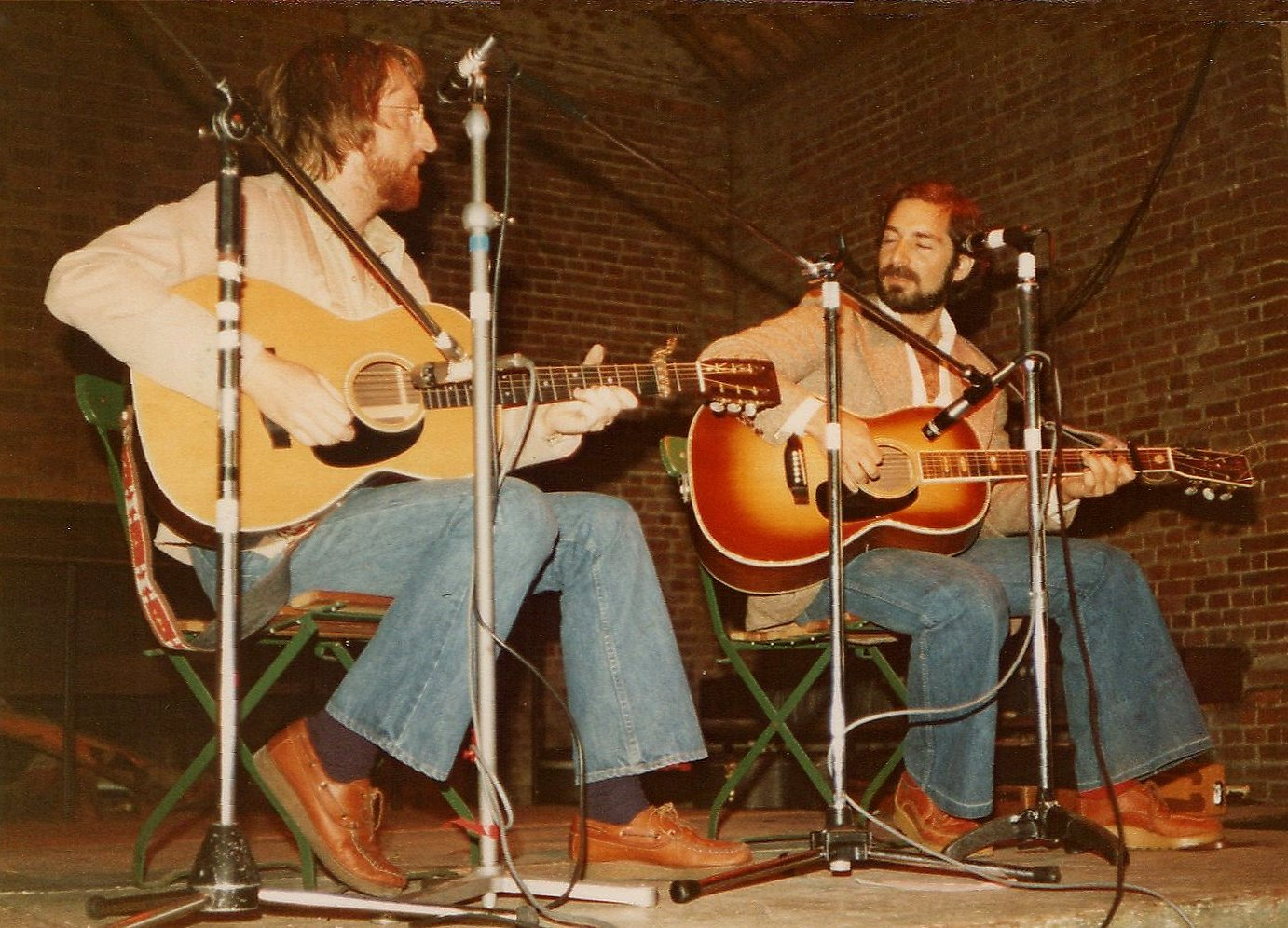
- Pat Alger (left) with Artie Traum at the Norwich Folk Festival, U.K., 1978

Background information
- Birth name: Patrick J. Alger
- Born: September 23, 1947 (age 77)
- Origin: LaGrange, Georgia, United States
- Genres: Country
- Occupation: Singer-songwriter
- Instrument: Vocals
- Years active: 1980–present
- Formerly of: Woodstock Mountains Revue

Patrick J. Alger (born September 23, 1947, in LaGrange, Georgia) is an American country music songwriter, singer and guitarist and a member of the Nashville Songwriters Hall of Fame (2010) and the Georgia Music Hall of Fame (2013).

== Early life and work ==
Patrick J. Alger was born in 1947 in LaGrange, Georgia. Alger attended Georgia Tech studying architecture but decided to concentrate on writing songs. He started as a solo folk performer at folk clubs.

In 1973, he moved to Woodstock, New York. It was there where he began his career as a musician and songwriter working together with Happy and Artie Traum as a member of the Woodstock Mountains Revue. The group included the Traum brothers, Arlen Roth, John Herald and Maria Muldaur among others. Some of the songs he wrote during this period were "Old Time Music" and "Southern Crescent Line."

== Career ==
In 1980, his first success as a songwriter was after Livingston Taylor had a hit with "First Time Love". The next year, in 1981, he moved to Nashville. 1984-88, he toured with The Everly Brothers in the United States and in Europe. He teamed with Nanci Griffith, and co-wrote Griffith's hit songs "Once in a Very Blue Moon" and "Lone Star State of Mind." Some of his songs were recorded by Kathy Mattea such as "Goin' Gone", "She Came From Fort Worth", and "A Few Good Things Remain."

He wrote four Number One hits for Garth Brooks like "Unanswered Prayers", "What She's Doing Now", "The Thunder Rolls", and "That Summer." He also wrote hits for Hal Ketchum, "Small Town Saturday Night," for Trisha Yearwood, "Like We Never Had A Broken Heart," for Don Williams, "True Love", and for Mark Collie, "Calloused Hands." Through the years, his songs are recorded and performed by such diverse artists as Peter, Paul and Mary, Dolly Parton, Lyle Lovett, Brenda Lee, and Crystal Gayle. He has three critically-acclaimed solo albums in the 1990s featuring backup by Griffith, Lovett, Mattea, and Yearwood.

He has well over twenty hits to his credit, including eight Number One hits, and played venues all over the world, including a year-long tour as opening act for The Everly Brothers. He starred in the 30th anniversary of the Washington Center for the Performing Arts gala. He is featured on NPR Radio's "All Things Considered" and "Fresh Air", and hosted, along with fellow HOF inductee Tony Arata, WSM's radio show featuring past HOF inductees. The Music City Center, in Nashville, opened May 2013, and houses a permanent home for the NSAI inductees. The first floor gallery and outdoor courtyard features Nashville Songwriters Hall of Fame members. It is the project of the Nashville Songwriter's Foundation, of which Alger is a board member. His advocacy for the songwriter and their intellectual property rights is well-known as is the efforts of NSAI and NSF.

== Awards ==
1991, he was voted Songwriter of the Year by the Nashville Songwriter's Association International. The same year, he was voted Jukebox Songwriter of the Year by the American Society of Composers, Authors, and Publishers, ASCAP. 1992, he received the Country Songwriter of the Year award from ASCAP. Country Music Association awarded him two Triple Play awards for three Number One hits in a year. 2010, he was inducted into the Nashville Songwriters Hall of Fame. He serves as Chairman of the Nashville Songwriters Foundation, and is a two-time past President of Nashville Songwriters Association International. Pat Alger was inducted into the Georgia Music Hall of Fame in September 2013

== Discography ==
Alger first recorded one duet album with Artie Traum and then three solo albums:

- From The Heart (1980)
- True Love & Other Short Stories – Sugar Hill Records (1991)
- Seeds – Sugar Hill Records (1993)
- Notes and Grace Notes (1994)
