= List of awards and nominations received by Garth Brooks =

Garth Brooks awards and nominations
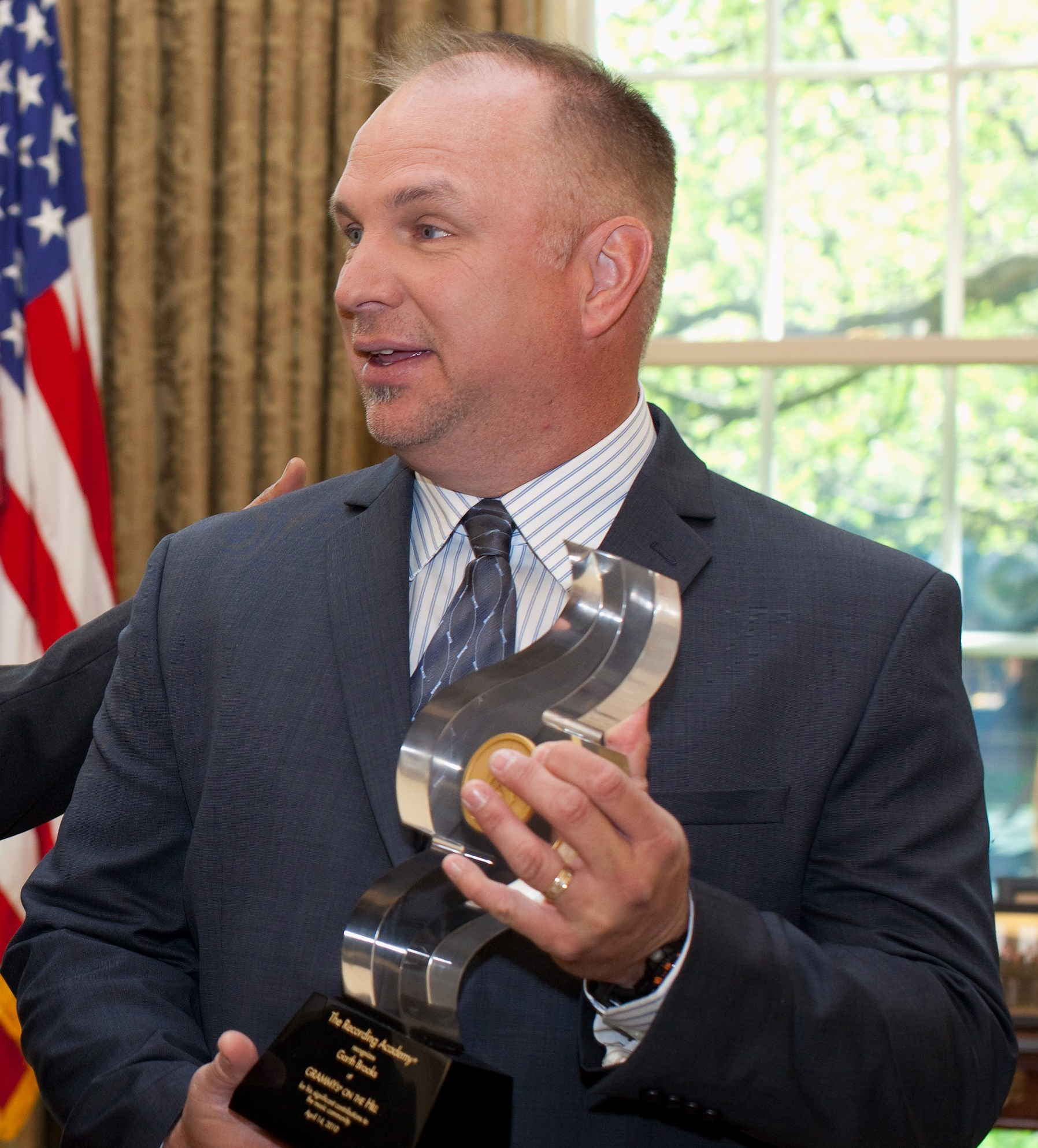
- Brooks receiving the Grammys on the Hill's Solo Artist of the Century award in 2010
Awards and nominations
| Award | Wins | Nominations |
| American Music Awards | 17 | 21 |
| Billboard | 19 | 23 |
| CMT | 2 | 3 |
| Grammy | 2 | 13 |
| NAACP | 1 | 1 |
| People's Choice | 2 | 13 |
| Radio Music | 8 | 9 |
| World Music | 5 | 5 |
| Academy of Country Music Awards | 23 | 49 |
| Country Music Association Awards | 10 | 29 |

Totals (Note: Certain award groups do not simply award one winner. They acknowledge several different recipients, have runners-up, and have third place. Since this is a specific recognition and is different from losing an award, runner-up mentions are considered wins in this award tally. For simplification and to avoid errors, each award in this list has been presumed to have had a prior nomination.)
- Wins: 91
- Nominations: 168

This is an incomplete list of awards and nominations received by American country music singer Garth Brooks.

== List of awards ==
=== Academy of Country Music Awards ===
Brooks has been nominated for a total of forty nine Academy of Country Music Awards, winning twenty three.

| Year | Nominee / work | Award | Result |
|---|---|---|---|
| 1989 | Garth Brooks | Top New Male Vocalist | Nominated |
| 1989 | "If Tomorrow Never Comes" | Song of the Year – Artist | Nominated |
| 1989 | "If Tomorrow Never Comes" | Song of the Year – Composer | Nominated |
| 1989 | "If Tomorrow Never Comes" | Single of the Year | Nominated |
| 1990 | Garth Brooks | Entertainer of the Year | Won |
| 1990 | Garth Brooks | Male Vocalist of the Year | Won |
| 1990 | "The Dance" | Song of the Year | Won |
| 1990 | "The Dance" | Video of the Year | Won |
| 1990 | No Fences | Album of the Year | Won |
| 1990 | "Friends in Low Places" | Single of the Year | Won |
| 1990 | "Friends in Low Places" | Song of the Year | Won |
| 1991 | Garth Brooks | Entertainer of the Year | Won |
| 1991 | Garth Brooks | Male Vocalist of the Year | Won |
| 1991 | Ropin' the Wind | Album of the Year | Won |
| 1991 | No Fences | Album of the Year | Won |
| 1991 | "Shameless" | Single of the Year | Won |
| 1991 | "The Thunder Rolls" | Video of the Year | Won |
| 1992 | Garth Brooks | Entertainer of the Year | Won |
| 1992 | Garth Brooks | Top Male Vocalist | Won |
| 1992 | "Whatcha Gonna Do with a Cowboy" (with Chris LeDoux) | Top Vocal Duet | Won |
| 1992 | The Chase | Album of the Year | Won |
| 1993 | Garth Brooks | Entertainer of the Year | Won |
| 1993 | "We Shall Be Free" | Video of the Year | Won |
| 1993 | Garth Brooks | Top Male Vocalist | Won |
| 1993 | "Ain't Goin' Down ('Til the Sun Comes Up)" | Single of the Year | Won |
| 1994 | Garth Brooks | Jim Reeves Memorial Award | Won |
| 1994 | "The Red Strokes" | Video of the Year | Won |
| 1994 | Garth Brooks | Entertainer of the Year | Won |
| 1994 | Garth Brooks | Top Male Vocalist | Won |
| 1994 | In Pieces | Album of the Year | Won |
| 1995 | Garth Brooks | Entertainer of the Year | Won |
| 1996 | Garth Brooks | Entertainer of the Year | Won |
| 1996 | "The Change" | Video of the Year | Won |
| 1997 | Garth Brooks | Gene Weed Special Achievement Award | Won |
| 1997 | Garth Brooks | Entertainer of the Year | Won |
| 1997 | Sevens | Album of the Year | Won |
| 1998 | Garth Brooks | Entertainer of the Year | Won |
| 1998 | Double Live | Album of the Year | Won |
| 1998 | Burnin' the Roadhouse Down (with Steve Wariner) | Vocal Event of the Year | Won |
| 1999 | Garth Brooks | Artist of the Decade | Won |
| 2001 | Garth Brooks | Entertainer of the Year | Won |
| 2001 | "Beer Run" (with George Jones) | Vocal Event of the Year | Won |
| 2005 | Garth Brooks | 40th Anniversary Milestone Award | Won |
| 2007 | Garth Brooks | Crystal Milestone Award | Won |
| 2010 | Garth Brooks | Cliffie Stone Pioneer Award | Won |
| 2014 | Garth Brooks | Milestone Award | Won |
| 2016 | Garth Brooks | Entertainer of the Year | Won |

=== American Music Awards ===
Brooks has been nominated for a total of twenty one American Music Awards, winning seventeen.

| Year | Nominee / work | Award | Result |
|---|---|---|---|
| 1991 | Garth Brooks | Favorite Country Male Artist | Won |
| 1992 | Garth Brooks | Favorite Country Male Artist | Won |
| 1992 | No Fences | Favorite Country Album | Won |
| 1992 | "The Thunder Rolls" | Favorite Country Single | Won |
| 1992 | Ropin' the Wind | Favorite Country Album | Won |
| 1993 | Garth Brooks | Favorite Country Male Artist | Won |
| 1993 | The Chase | Favorite Country Album | Won |
| 1993 | "The River" | Favorite Country Single | Won |
| 1994 | Garth Brooks | Favorite Country Male Artist | Won |
| 1994 | In Pieces | Favorite Country Album | Won |
| 1995 | Garth Brooks | Favorite Country Male Artist | Won |
| 1996 | Garth Brooks | Favorite Country Male Artist | Won |
| 1996 | The Hits | Favorite Country Album | Won |
| 1997 | Garth Brooks | Favorite Country Male Artist | Won |
| 1997 | Fresh Horses | Favorite Country Album | Won |
| 1998 | Garth Brooks | Favorite Country Male Artist | Won |
| 1998 | Sevens | Favorite Country Album | Won |
| 1999 | Garth Brooks | Favorite Country Male Artist | Won |
| 1999 | Double Live | Favorite Country Album | Won |
| 2002 | Garth Brooks | Award of Merit | Won |
| 2008 | Garth Brooks | Favorite Country Male Artist | Won |
| 2008 | The Ultimate Hits | Favorite Country Album | Won |
| 2014 | Blame It All on My Roots: Five Decades of Influences | Favorite Country Album | Won |

=== ASCAP Awards ===
Brooks has won three ASCAP Awards.

| Year | Nominee / work | Award | Result |
|---|---|---|---|
| 1993 | Garth Brooks | Songwriter of the Year | Won |
| 1999 | Garth Brooks | Founder Award | Won |
| 2014 | Garth Brooks | Centennial Award | Won |

=== Billboard Music Awards ===
Brooks has been nominated for twenty three Billboard Music Awards, winning nineteen.

| Year | Nominee / work | Award | Result |
|---|---|---|---|
| 1991 | Garth Brooks | Album Artist of the Year | Won |
| 1991 | No Fences | Top Country Album | Won |
| 1992 | Garth Brooks | Top Artist | Won |
| 1992 | Garth Brooks | Top Country Artist | Won |
| 1992 | Garth Brooks | Top Pop Artist | Won |
| 1992 | Garth Brooks | Album Artist of the Year | Won |
| 1992 | Ropin' the Wind | Top Country Album | Won |
| 1993 | Garth Brooks | Top Artist | Won |
| 1993 | Garth Brooks | Top Country Artist | Won |
| 1993 | Garth Brooks | Top Pop Artist | Won |
| 1995 | The Hits | Top Billboard 200 Album | Won |
| 1996 | Garth Brooks | Top Country Artist | Won |
| 1997 | Garth Brooks | Billboard Music Artist Achievement Award | Won |
| 1998 | Garth Brooks | Top Country Artist | Won |
| 1998 | Garth Brooks | Country Song Artist of the Year | Won |
| 1998 | Garth Brooks | Country Album Artist of the Year | Won |
| 1998 | Garth Brooks | Male Album Artist of the Year | Won |
| 1998 | Sevens | Male Album of the Year | Won |
| 1998 | Sevens | Top Country Album | Won |
| 1999 | Garth Brooks | Album Artist of the Year | Won |
| 1999 | Garth Brooks | Country Album Artist of the Year | Won |
| 2002 | Garth Brooks | Country Songs Artist of the Year | Won |
| 2014 | Blame It All on My Roots: Five Decades of Influences | Top Country Album | Won |

=== Blockbuster Entertainment Awards ===
Brooks has won two Blockbuster Entertainment Awards.

| Year | Nominee / work | Award | Result |
|---|---|---|---|
| 1997 | "Garth Brooks | Artist of the 90s | Won |
| 2000 | "Garth Brooks | Favorite Male Country Artist | Won |

=== Canadian Country Music Association ===
| Year | Nominee / work | Award | Result |
|---|---|---|---|
| 1996 | Fresh Horses | Top Selling Album | Won |

=== CMT Music Awards ===
Brooks has been nominated for three CMT Music Awards, winning two.

| Year | Nominee / work | Award | Result |
|---|---|---|---|
| 1991 | Garth Brooks | Entertainer of the Year | Won |
| 1991 | "The Dance" | Video of the Year | Won |
| 2008 | "Workin' for a Livin' (with Huey Lewis) | Collaborative Video of the Year | Nominated |

=== Country Music Association Awards ===
| Year | Nominee / work | Award | Result |
|---|---|---|---|
| 1990 | Garth Brooks | Horizon Award | Won |
| 1990 | "The Dance" | Music Video of the Year | Won |
| 1990 | Garth Brooks | Male Vocalist of the Year | Nominated |
| 1990 | "If Tomorrow Never Comes" | Song of the Year | Nominated |
| 1990 | "If Tomorrow Never Comes" | Single of the Year | Nominated |
| 1991 | Garth Brooks | Entertainer of the Year | Won |
| 1991 | No Fences | Album of the Year | Won |
| 1991 | "Friends in Low Places" | Single of the Year | Won |
| 1991 | "The Thunder Rolls" | Music Video of the Year | Won |
| 1991 | Garth Brooks | Male Vocalist of the Year | Nominated |
| 1992 | Garth Brooks | Entertainer of the Year | Won |
| 1992 | Ropin' the Wind | Album of the Year | Won |
| 1992 | Garth Brooks | Male Vocalist of the Year | Nominated |
| 1993 | Garth Brooks | Entertainer of the Year | Nominated |
| 1993 | Garth Brooks | Male Vocalist of the Year | Nominated |
| 1993 | The Chase | Album of the Year | Nominated |
| 1993 | "I Don't Need Your Rockin' Chair" (with George Jones, Vince Gill, and Mark Chesnutt) | Vocal Event of the Year | Won |
| 1994 | Garth Brooks | Entertainer of the Year | Won |
| 1994 | "Standing Outside the Fire" | Music Video of the Year | Nominated |
| 1995 | Garth Brooks | Entertainer of the Year | Nominated |
| 1995 | "The Red Strokes" | Music Video of the Year | Nominated |
| 1996 | Garth Brooks | Entertainer of the Year | Nominated |
| 1997 | Garth Brooks | Entertainer of the Year | Won |
| 1998 | Garth Brooks | Entertainer of the Year | Won |
| 1998 | Garth Brooks | Male Vocalist of the Year | Won |
| 1998 | Sevens | Album of the Year | Won |
| 1998 | "In Another's Eyes" (with Trisha Yearwood) | Vocal Event of the Year | Won |
| 1999 | Garth Brooks | Entertainer of the Year | Won |
| 2002 | "Beer Run" (with George Jones) | Vocal Event of the Year | Won |
| 2015 | Garth Brooks | Entertainer of the Year | Won |
| 2016 | Garth Brooks | Entertainer of the Year | Won |
| 2017 | Garth Brooks | Entertainer of the Year | Won |
| 2019 | Garth Brooks | Entertainer of the Year | Won |

=== GLAAD Media Awards ===
Brooks has won one GLAAD Media Award.

| Year | Nominee / work | Award | Result |
|---|---|---|---|
| 1993 | "We Shall Be Free" | Outstanding Recording | Won |

=== Golden Globe Awards ===
Brooks has been nominated for one Golden Globe Award.

| Year | Nominee / work | Award | Result |
|---|---|---|---|
| 2001 | "When You Come Back to Me Again" (Frequency) | Best Original Song | Nominated |

=== Grammy Awards ===
Brooks has been nominated for a total of thirteen Grammy Awards, winning two.

| Year | Nominee / work | Award | Result |
|---|---|---|---|
| 1990 | "Friends in Low Places" | Best Male Country Vocal Performance | Nominated |
| 1991 | Ropin' the Wind | Best Male Country Vocal Performance | Won |
| 1991 | "The Thunder Rolls" | Best Music Video | Nominated |
| 1992 | The Chase | Best Male Country Vocal Performance | Nominated |
| 1992 | "Whatcha Gonna Do with a Cowboy" (with Chris LeDoux) | Best Country Collaboration with Vocals | Nominated |
| 1993 | "Ain't Goin' Down ('Til the Sun Comes Up)" | Best Male Country Vocal Performance | Nominated |
| 1997 | "In Another's Eyes" (with Trisha Yearwood) | Best Country Collaboration with Vocals | Won |
| 1997 | "In Another's Eyes" (with Trisha Yearwood) | Best Country Song | Nominated |
| 1998 | "To Make You Feel My Love" | Best Male Country Vocal Performance | Nominated |
| 1998 | "Where Your Road Leads" (with Trisha Yearwood) | Best Country Collaboration with Vocals | Nominated |
| 1998 | Sevens | Best Country Album | Nominated |
| 2001 | "Beer Run" (with George Jones) | Best Country Collaboration with Vocals | Nominated |
| 2002 | "Squeeze Me In" (with Trisha Yearwood) | Best Country Collaboration with Vocals | Nominated |
| 2007 | "Love Will Always Win" (with Trisha Yearwood) | Best Country Collaboration with Vocals | Nominated |

=== Grammys on the Hill Awards ===
| Year | Nominee / work | Award | Result |
|---|---|---|---|
| 2010 | Garth Brooks | Solo Artist of the Century | Won |

=== iHeartRadio Music Awards ===
| Year | Nominee / work | Award | Result |
|---|---|---|---|
| 2016 | The Garth Brooks World Tour with Trisha Yearwood | Best Tour | Won |

=== Juno Awards ===
Brooks has been nominated for two Juno Awards, winning one.

| Year | Nominee / work | Award | Result |
|---|---|---|---|
| 1992 | Garth Brooks | Foreign Entertainer of the Year | Won |
| 1993 | Garth Brooks | International Entertainer of the Year | Won |

=== NAACP Image Awards ===
Brooks has won one NAACP Image Award.

| Year | Nominee / work | Award | Result |
|---|---|---|---|
| 1996 | Garth Brooks | Founders Award | Won |

=== People's Choice Awards ===
| Year | Nominee / work | Award | Result |
|---|---|---|---|
| 1992 | Garth Brooks | Favorite Male Artist | Won |
| 1992 | Garth Brooks | Favorite Country Male Singer | Won |
| 1993 | Garth Brooks | Favorite Male Artist | Won |
| 1994 | Garth Brooks | Favorite Male Artist | Won |
| 1995 | Garth Brooks | Favorite Male Artist | Won |
| 1996 | Garth Brooks | Favorite Male Artist | Won |
| 1997 | Garth Brooks | Favorite All-Time Music Performer | Won |
| 1997 | Garth Brooks | Favorite Male Artist | Won |
| 2001 | Garth Brooks | Favorite Male Artist | Won |
| 2002 | Garth Brooks | Favorite Male Artist | Won |

=== Primetime Emmy Awards ===
| Year | Nominee / work | Award | Result |
|---|---|---|---|
| 1998 | Garth Brooks | Outstanding Performance in a Variety or Music Program | Nominated |
| 1998 | Garth Live From Central Park | Outstanding Variety, Music, or Comedy Special | Nominated |

=== Radio Music Awards ===
| Year | Nominee / work | Award | Result |
|---|---|---|---|
| 2000 | Garth Brooks | Artist of the Year: Country Radio | Won |

=== Songwriters Hall of Fame Awards ===
| Year | Nominee / work | Award | Result |
|---|---|---|---|
| 2002 | Garth Brooks | Howie Richmond Hitmaker Award | Won |

=== SoundExchange Awards ===
Brooks has won one SoundExchange Award, the SoundExchange Digital Radio Award, after receiving over 1 billion streams of his music on digital services within a year, becoming the first country artist to win the award.

| Year | Nominee / work | Award | Result |
|---|---|---|---|
| 2015 | Garth Brooks | SoundExchange Digital Radio Award | Won |

=== World Music Awards ===
| Year | Nominee / work | Award | Result |
|---|---|---|---|
| 1992 | Garth Brooks | World's Best-Selling Country Artist | Won |
| 1993 | Garth Brooks | World's Best-Selling Country Artist | Won |
| 1994 | Garth Brooks | World's Best-Selling Country Artist | Won |
| 1995 | Garth Brooks | World's Best-Selling Country Artist | Won |
| 1996 | Garth Brooks | World's Best-Selling Country Artist | Won |
