= The Blame It All On My Roots Tour =

Concert tour by Garth Brooks

Blame It All On My Roots: The Arena Tour
- Tour by Garth Brooks
- Promotional poster for the tour
- Start date: August 20, 2026
- No. of shows: 38

Garth Brooks concert chronology
- Plus One (2023–2024); The Blame It All On My Roots Tour (2026–present); The Garth Brooks Irish Tour (2027)

The Blame It All On My Roots Tour is an ongoing concert tour by American country music singer Garth Brooks. Taking its title from the opening lyric of his 1990 signature song "Friends in Low Places", the tour marks Brooks' return to an arena format following the conclusion of his Stadium Tour (2019–2022) and his Las Vegas residency (2023–2024). The tour began on August 20, 2026, at Gainbridge Fieldhouse in Indianapolis, Indiana.

Organized to coincide with the thirtieth anniversary of his 1996–1998 World Tour, the production was designed as a "throwback" to Brooks' 1990s arena engagements, incorporating a central 360-degree stage, fixed flat-rate ticket pricing without dynamic markups, and legacy visual elements, such as his signature overhead "drum pod".

Following Brooks' established touring practice, host cities and dates are announced incrementally, rather than through a single master itinerary. Tickets become available on a staggered basis across different regional markets, frequently generating high traffic volume in digital queues. Driven by demand, waiting rooms for shows have exceeded tens of thousands of users per engagement, leading initial single show listings to expand into multi-night stands.

== Background and development ==
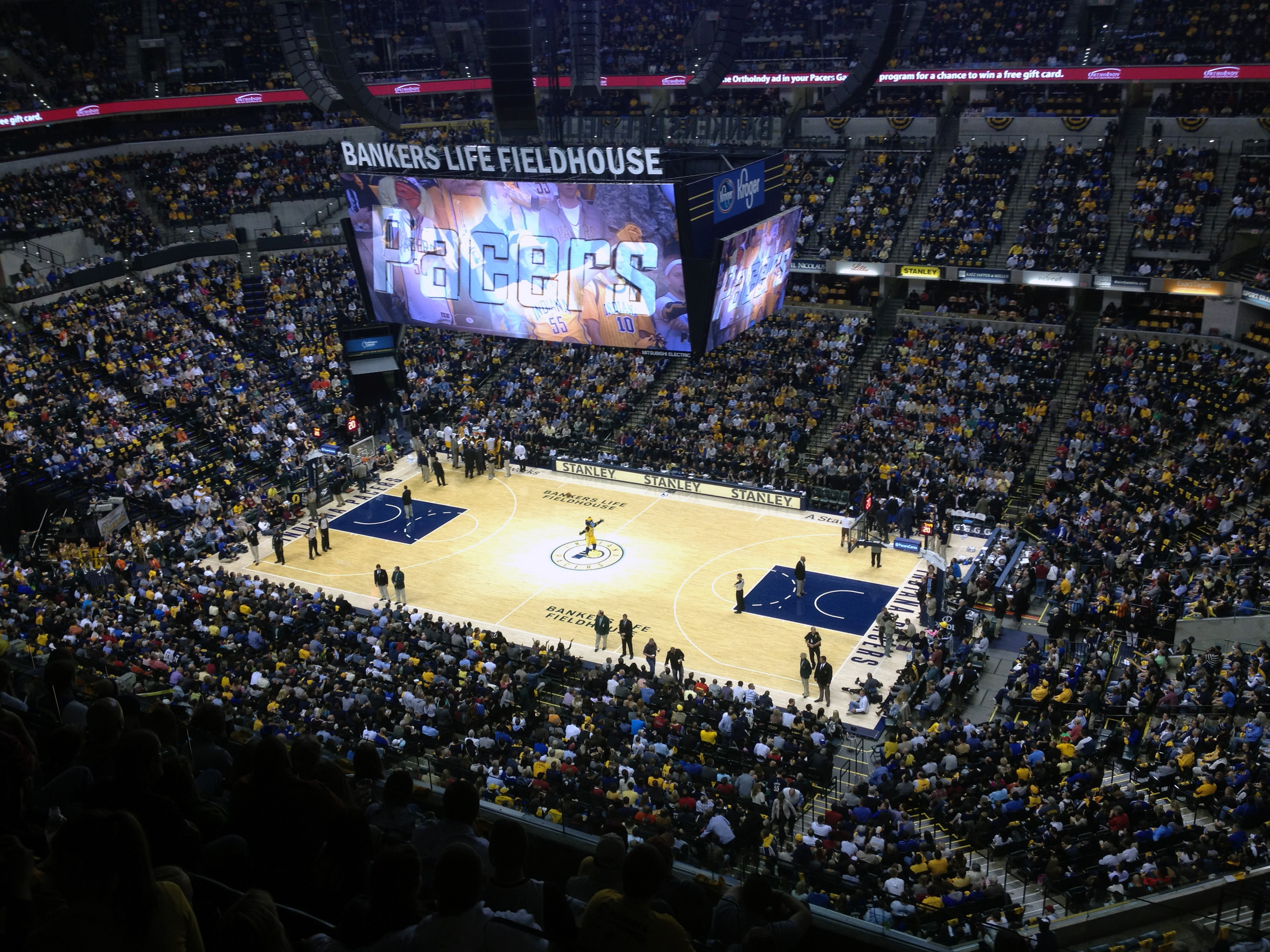
Gainbridge Fieldhouse (pictured), site of the tour's opening four show run and Brooks' first performances there since five concerts in 2017 during his World Tour.

Following the conclusion of his Stadium Tour and Las Vegas residency, Brooks announced "Blame It All On My Roots: The Arena Tour" on July 7, 2026, taking its title from the opening line of his 1990 signature song, "Friends in Low Places". Conceived as an explicit "throwback", the venture marked Brooks' return to traditional indoor arenas for the first time since his 2014–2017 World Tour. The creative direction was heavily inspired by his 1996–1998 World Tour, which established his reputation for arena rock-influenced country production in multi-night arena engagements.

Rehearsals took place in early August 2026 ahead of the four-night opening run at Gainbridge Fieldhouse in Indianapolis. Explaining the decision to transition back to arena environments after years of outdoor stadium dates, Brooks stated that smaller indoor venues allowed for greater acoustic control and spontaneous audience interaction during the unscripted "request" portions of the set. Brooks also revealed that live audio from the tour would be recorded for an upcoming live album project, titled Killer Live.

=== Promotional performances ===
Ahead of the four show engagement at Denver's Ball Arena in September 2026, Brooks performed an unannounced concert at the Grizzly Rose, a 2,000 capacity Denver honky-tonk, referenced in his 1995 song "The Old Stuff". The performance was billed under the pseudonym "Yukon Jack", an alias Brooks previously used for a 1993 performance in Clovis, New Mexico, while en route to perform the national anthem at Super Bowl XXVII in Pasadena. Entry was granted on a first come, first served basis, resulting in several thousand non-ticketed fans gathering outside the venue. Upon seeing the crowd outside, Brooks offered to perform a second set for those waiting in line, however the local law enforcement declined the proposal due to safety concerns.

== Stage design and production ==
Brooks’ signature drum pod rotates above the stage during "Ain't Goin' Down ('Til the Sun Comes Up)".

To mirror the visual identity and intimacy of Brooks' 1990s arena productions, designers implemented a central 360-degree in-the-round stage configuration, positioned at center floor to maximize venue seating capacity and preserve unobstructed sight lines. Brooks described the technical adaptation of translating his outdoor stadium setup to indoor arenas as "putting the stadium show in a box". The primary performance floor utilizes a low profile platform equipped with perimeter catwalks, allowing performers unhindered access to all four quadrants of the arena floor.

Suspended directly above the central platform is Brooks' signature steel "drum pod" enclosure, a staple of his 1990s concert engagements. It sits centerstage, elevated to house the drum kit above the main band area. The drum pod and adjacent band platforms also physically elevate and rotate above the stage floor during high energy songs, such as "Ain't Goin' Down ('Til the Sun Comes Up)". Mounted above the drum pod is a high definition cylindrical LED video system, dubbed as "the Halo". The Halo projects real time IMAG camera feeds, automated visual lighting sequences, and archival concert footage throughout the performance.

To eliminate physical obstructions around the perimeter of the stage, the production removes traditional floor mounted monitor wedges and side fill speakers in favor of in-ear monitoring and a distributed, suspended audio matrix. Flown line-array speaker clusters are suspended from the venue's overhead grid to deliver balanced acoustics across all seating tiers while maintaining an open 360-degree field of view around the main performance area.

== Concert synopsis ==
The concert opens with the central stage obscured by an overhead rig structure. Minutes before the performance, the Halo video screen displays a montage of Brooks's career footage, award highlights, and commercial milestones. Following the video, the overhead structure lifts to reveal the stage and a central drum pod. The staging mirrors the opening setup of Brooks' 1996–1998 World Tour, as a grand piano emerges from the rear of the stage to "The Old Stuff" played as a solo piano arrangement. A musician in a cowboy hat plays while Brooks sings, creating the visual impression that Brooks is seated at the instrument, before Brooks emerges from an opening inside the piano.

"Rodeo" is followed by "Two of a Kind, Workin' on a Full House". Brooks then introduces "The Beaches of Cheyenne". This opening sequence is consistent across the tour, however the set list becomes more variable immediately following. Brooks frequently takes song requests from signs held in the crowd, performing full-band renditions of tracks such as "Papa Loved Mama", or acoustic verse-and-chorus excerpts. These selections have included lesser-played album tracks like "The Red Strokes" alongside covers such as "Fishin' in the Dark". The length of the request segment varies, and it is occasionally omitted. Brooks has stated that audience reaction determines the pacing and song selection for each show.

Brooks (center) alongside Jimmy Mattingly and David Gant during a 2026 performance at Allstate Arena in Rosemont, Illinois.

"Two Piña Coladas" generally follows the request portion, accompanied by beach imagery on the Halo screen. The show then transitions to a series of ballads and sing-alongs, including "Unanswered Prayers", "The River", and "Much Too Young (To Feel This Damn Old)", while venue screens display live shots of the audience. Brooks then performs "That Summer" while navigating the circular stage layout. At select shows, Brooks incorporates a Bob Seger cover, playing "Night Moves" acoustically, or introducing "Turn the Page" before the full band joins. Brooks has explained the chord in "Turn the Page", which Seger associated with life on the road, evokes thunder to him. This leads directly into "The Thunder Rolls", featuring storm audio, video effects, and synchronized lighting. At other shows, the Seger selection is omitted entirely, with "The Thunder Rolls" being introduced by thunder sound effects.

Brooks follows with "Callin' Baton Rouge", which he cites on stage as his favorite song to perform live. The show may continue with "Ain't Goin' Down ('Til the Sun Comes Up)" or "The Fever", during which the central drum pod and attached platforms elevate and rotate above the stage. After performing "Shameless", the main set concludes with either "Friends in Low Places" followed by "The Dance", or "The Dance" alone. When "Friends in Low Places" appears in the main set, it features the extended third verse, audience participation, and confetti cannons shoot confetti into the lower bowl.

After leaving the stage, Brooks returns for an encore segment, dubbed “Housekeeping”. He looks for audience signs requesting songs and selects some requests, usually performing a verse and chorus. The songs vary by show and may include deep cuts or covers associated with artists such as George Strait, Keith Whitley, and Randy Travis. The encore’s sequence depends on whether "Friends in Low Places" was performed during the main set. If it was, Brooks generally proceeds to the second encore after "Housekeeping". If it was omitted, he may recall shows in small honky-tonks early in his career before performing a singalong cover of Billy Joel's "Piano Man", then introducing David Allan Coe's "You Never Even Call Me by My Name" as a more serious song, performing its additional verse and closing chorus. Brooks then speaks about wanting to be part of a song whose lyrics audiences know from football games and karaoke before beginning the introduction to "Friends in Low Places". The song is performed in this later position when it was omitted from the main set. Brooks leaves the stage again before returning for the second encore, "Standing Outside the Fire". The Halo screen displays fire imagery as the lighting changes across the arena. The concert ends with Brooks and the touring band taking a final bow.

== Commercial performance ==
The tour implemented a uniform pricing structure across all markets, selling every seat for a flat price of approximately US$154. In contrast to industry trends, the tour follows Brooks' traditions of not utilizing dynamic pricing models, tiered VIP packages, or advanced fan club presales, making all tickets available simultaneously to the general public upon on-sale dates. High ticket demand triggered heavy traffic on Ticketmaster, with over 380,000 users entered the virtual waiting room when tickets were made available, resulting in the addition of two more performances to satisfy demand. A similar expansion occurred for Denver, where two shows were expanded to four across three days. Rosemont's run was also expanded from a two night engagement to four performances across four consecutive days. During ticket sales for the tour's run at Salt Lake City, queues exceeded 50,000 users per show, with SeatGeek verifying over 90 percent of traffic consisted of verified human buyers (rather than automated scalping bots), resulting in two additional performances added. More than 600,000 registered users entered ticket queues for the Tulsa slate of shows in Brooks' native Oklahoma, leading to three total performances. For the tour's Seattle engagement, two shows were expanded to three, with a fourth show eventually added after more than 30,000 users were queued in the virtual waiting room.

After initially announcing two concerts in Kansas City, a third show was added. The third show's ticket on-sale via AXS was later halted citing "excessive bot activity". The added engagement was eventually canceled, while the two previously announced Kansas City performances remained on the schedule. The tour's first international engagement, a two show run in Hamilton, Ontario, was expanded to four shows after high demand.

== Critical reception ==
Billboard's Melinda Newman highlighted the production's nostalgia-focused staging, notably the revival of his overhead "drum pod", and the lack of an opening act, allowing Brooks to deliver a two-hour set without vocal strain. Brooks' performance energy has been praised, along with the tour's return to an intimate, 360-degree arena setting. Other coverage of the tour's opening four-night stint emphasized fan response and economic impact, noting Downtown Indianapolis' venue operations and positive fan reception toward the extended acoustic "request" sets. The scaled down indoor production has been said to successfully retain the energy of Brooks' stadium runs, highlighting the central stage setup and audio mix for creating an intimate atmosphere despite the venue's scale. Brooks' energetic stage presence and the show's energy level were highlighted by a USA Today review, along with the audience's singalongs. Rolling Stone noted the tour's flat ticket pricing structure and absence of dynamic markups reinforced a sense of equity among attendees, complementing the tour's overarching emphasis on 1990s nostalgia and accessibility.

== Set list ==
The following set list is representative of the performance on August 20, 2026 in Indianapolis, Indiana. It does not represent all concerts for the duration of the tour.

Main set
1. "The Old Stuff"
2. "Rodeo"
3. "Two of a Kind, Workin' on a Full House"
4. "The Beaches of Cheyenne"
5. "Two Piña Coladas"
6. "Papa Loved Mama"
7. "The River"
8. "The Thunder Rolls"
9. "We Bury the Hatchet"
10. "Much Too Young (To Feel This Damn Old)"
11. "Unanswered Prayers"
12. "That Summer"
13. "Callin' Baton Rouge"
14. "Ain't Goin' Down ('Til the Sun Comes Up)"
15. "Shameless" (Billy Joel cover)
16. "Shout" (The Isley Brothers cover)
17. "Friends in Low Places"
18. "The Dance"

"Housekeeping" fan request set

19. "Ten Feet Away" (Keith Whitley cover)
20. "The Red Strokes"
21. "She's Every Woman"
22. "Belleau Wood"

Encore

23. "Standing Outside the Fire"

== Tour dates ==
List of concerts, showing date, number of shows, city, country, and venue
Date Number of shows	City	Country	Venue
Leg 1
August 20, 2026	Indianapolis	United States	Gainbridge Fieldhouse
August 21, 2026	Indianapolis	United States	Gainbridge Fieldhouse
August 22, 2026	Indianapolis	United States	Gainbridge Fieldhouse
August 23, 2026	Indianapolis	United States	Gainbridge Fieldhouse
September 4, 2026	Denver	United States	Ball Arena
September 5, 2026	Denver	United States	Ball Arena
September 6, 2026; 2 shows	Denver	United States	Ball Arena
September 10, 2026	Rosemont (Note: Labeled as Chicago in promotional material.)	United States	Allstate Arena
September 11, 2026	Rosemont	United States	Allstate Arena
September 12, 2026	Rosemont	United States	Allstate Arena
September 13, 2026	Rosemont	United States	Allstate Arena
September 18, 2026	Washington, D.C.	United States	Capital One Arena
September 19, 2026	Washington, D.C.	United States	Capital One Arena
September 25, 2026	Orlando	United States	Kia Center
September 26, 2026	Orlando	United States	Kia Center
September 27, 2026	Orlando	United States	Kia Center
October 8, 2026	Salt Lake City	United States	Delta Center
October 9, 2026	Salt Lake City	United States	Delta Center
October 10, 2026	Salt Lake City	United States	Delta Center
October 11, 2026	Salt Lake City	United States	Delta Center
October 23, 2026	Tulsa	United States	BOK Center
October 24, 2026	Tulsa	United States	BOK Center
October 25, 2026	Tulsa	United States	BOK Center
November 6, 2026	Kansas City	United States	T-Mobile Center
November 7, 2026	Kansas City	United States	T-Mobile Center
November 12, 2026	Seattle	United States	Climate Pledge Arena
November 13, 2026	Seattle	United States	Climate Pledge Arena
November 14, 2026	Seattle	United States	Climate Pledge Arena
November 15, 2026	Seattle	United States	Climate Pledge Arena
December 3, 2026	Hamilton	Canada	TD Coliseum
December 4, 2026	Hamilton	Canada	TD Coliseum
December 5, 2026	Hamilton	Canada	TD Coliseum
December 6, 2026	Hamilton	Canada	TD Coliseum
December 11, 2026	Minneapolis	United States	Target Center
December 12, 2026	Minneapolis	United States	Target Center
Leg 2
February 5, 2027	North Little Rock (Note: Labeled as Little Rock in promotional material.)	United States	Simmons Bank Arena
February 6, 2027	North Little Rock	United States	Simmons Bank Arena

=== Cancelled shows ===
List of cancelled concerts, showing date, city, country, venue and reason for cancellation
Date	City	Country	Venue	Reason
November 7, 2026	Kansas City	United States	T-Mobile Center	Added matinee show; canceled after bot activity disrupted the ticket sale.

== Personnel ==
Personnel adapted from the August 20, 2026 concert in Indianapolis, Indiana. It may not reflect the personnel from each concert on the tour.

Musicians

- Robert Bailey – backing vocals
- Garth Brooks – vocals, acoustic guitar
- David Gant – keyboards
- Mark Greenwood – bass guitar, backing vocals
- Vicki Hampton – backing vocals
- Jimmy Mattingly – fiddle, acoustic guitar
- Steve McClure – pedal steel guitar, electric guitar
- Mike Palmer – drums, percussion

Production and staging

- Garth Brooks – creative direction
- Robert Allen – tour manager

== See also ==
- List of Garth Brooks concert tours
