= The Garth Brooks World Tour (1993–1994) =

1993–1994 concert tour by Garth Brooks

- Tour by Garth Brooks
- Location: North America, Europe, Oceania
- Associated album: In Pieces
- Start date: January 29, 1993
- End date: October 11, 1994
- Legs: 3
- No. of shows: 63 in North America; 26 in Europe; 10 in Oceania; 96 total

Garth Brooks concert chronology
- Ropin' the Wind Tour (1991–1992); The Garth Brooks World Tour (1993–1994); The Garth Brooks World Tour (1996–1998)

The Garth Brooks World Tour was a concert tour by American country music artist Garth Brooks from 1993 to 1994. Spanning ten countries in less than two years, it was Brooks' most travelled tour to date, and his third concert tour. It launched in support of his 1993 album, In Pieces, and visited many cities throughout North America, Europe, Oceania, and South America.

== Show synopsis ==
Each concert began with Brooks rising from behind the drum kit, performing "Standing Outside the Fire" with fire pyrotechnics engulfing the stage. Many other special effects were used in the concert, including thunder and rain during "The Thunder Rolls", not common to more traditional country concerts. The encore performance of "Ain't Goin' Down ('Til the Sun Comes Up)", featuring Brooks flying about the venue on a specially modified trapeze mechanism, has become a staple of Brooks' live performances.

== Recordings ==
The tour's September 24, 1993 concert at Texas Stadium in Dallas was recorded and broadcast on NBC, titled This is Garth Brooks, Too! (a follow-up to Brooks' 1992 televised concert). It was later included in Brooks' The Entertainer DVD collection, released in 2006.

== Set list ==
The typical set for this tour was as follows (this does not represent all concerts for the duration of the series):

1. "Standing Outside the Fire"
2. "Rodeo"
3. "Papa Loved Mama"
4. "That Summer"
5. "American Honky-Tonk Bar Association"
6. "Much Too Young (To Feel This Damn Old)"
7. "The River"
8. "We Shall Be Free"
9. "To All The Girls I've Loved Before"
10. "What She's Doing Now"
11. "Unanswered Prayers"
12. "Two of a Kind, Workin' on a Full House"
13. "The Thunder Rolls"
14. "Callin' Baton Rouge"
15. "Shameless"
16. "Friends in Low Places"
17. "The Dance"

Encore:

18. "Ain't Goin' Down ('Til the Sun Comes Up)"

== Tour dates ==
Concert dates were announced at random, a tradition later popularized by Brooks on his other world tours. Because of this factor, no detailed list remains intact of each concert performed on Brooks' 1993–94 tour.

List of concerts, showing date, number of shows, city, country, and venue
Date	City	Country	Venue
North America Leg 1
January 29, 1993	Inglewood	United States	Great Western Forum
February 22, 1993	Houston	United States	Astrodome (Note: Part of Houston Livestock Show and Rodeo)
July 30, 1993	Cheyenne	United States	Cheyenne Frontier Days Arena
July 31, 1993	Cheyenne	United States	Cheyenne Frontier Days Arena
August 3, 1993	Tacoma	United States	Tacoma Dome
August 7, 1993	Pullman	United States	Beasley Coliseum
August 12, 1993	Sacramento	United States	ARCO Arena
August 13, 1993	Sacramento	United States	ARCO Arena
August 14, 1993	Sacramento	United States	ARCO Arena
August 15, 1993	Sacramento	United States	ARCO Arena
August 16, 1993	Las Vegas	United States	Thomas & Mack Center
August 17, 1993	Las Vegas	United States	Thomas & Mack Center
August 18, 1993	Las Vegas	United States	Thomas & Mack Center
August 19, 1993	Salt Lake City	United States	Delta Center
August 20, 1993	Salt Lake City	United States	Delta Center
North America Leg 2
September 23, 1993	Irving	United States	Texas Stadium
September 25, 1993	Irving	United States	Texas Stadium
October 1, 1993	Charlotte	United States	Charlotte Coliseum
October 2, 1993	Charlotte	United States	Charlotte Coliseum
October 6, 1993	Rosemont	United States	Rosemont Horizon
October 7, 1993	Rosemont	United States	Rosemont Horizon
October 8, 1993	Rosemont	United States	Rosemont Horizon
October 9, 1993	Rosemont	United States	Rosemont Horizon
October 23, 1993	Fargo	United States	Fargodome
October 24, 1993	Fargo	United States	Fargodome
October 27, 1993	Hampton	United States	Hampton Coliseum
October 28, 1993	Hampton	United States	Hampton Coliseum
October 29, 1993	Hampton	United States	Hampton Coliseum
November 5, 1993	Lexington	United States	Rupp Arena
November 6, 1993	Lexington	United States	Rupp Arena
November 10, 1993	Uniondale	United States	Nassau Coliseum
November 11, 1993	Uniondale	United States	Nassau Coliseum
November 13, 1993	Ottawa	Canada	Ottawa Civic Centre
November 19, 1993	Orlando	United States	Orlando Arena
November 20, 1993	Orlando	United States	Orlando Arena
November 21, 1993	Orlando	United States	Orlando Arena
December 3, 1993	Memphis	United States	Pyramid Arena
December 4, 1993	Memphis	United States	Pyramid Arena
December 9, 1993	Baton Rouge	United States	Pete Maravich Assembly Center
December 10, 1993	Baton Rouge	United States	Pete Maravich Assembly Center
December 11, 1993	Baton Rouge	United States	Pete Maravich Assembly Center
North America Leg 3
February 3, 1994	Evansville	United States	Roberts Municipal Stadium
February 4, 1994	Evansville	United States	Roberts Municipal Stadium
February 5, 1994	Evansville	United States	Roberts Municipal Stadium
February 12, 1994	South Bend	United States	Joyce Center
February 13, 1994	South Bend	United States	Joyce Center
February 17, 1994	Providence	United States	Providence Civic Center
February 18, 1994	New Haven	United States	New Haven Coliseum
February 23, 1994	Minneapolis	United States	Target Center
February 25, 1994	Minneapolis	United States	Target Center
February 26, 1994	Minneapolis	United States	Target Center
March 2, 1994	Murfreesboro	United States	Murphy Center
March 3, 1994	Murfreesboro	United States	Murphy Center
March 4, 1994	Murfreesboro	United States	Murphy Center
March 5, 1994	Murfreesboro	United States	Murphy Center
March 11, 1994	Tallahassee	United States	Leon County Civic Center
March 12, 1994	Tallahassee	United States	Leon County Civic Center
March 18, 1994	Buffalo	United States	Buffalo Memorial Auditorium
March 19, 1994	Buffalo	United States	Buffalo Memorial Auditorium
March 24, 1994	Iowa City	United States	Carver–Hawkeye Arena
March 25, 1994	Iowa City	United States	Carver–Hawkeye Arena
March 26, 1994	Iowa City	United States	Carver–Hawkeye Arena
Europe Leg 1
March 30, 1994	Dublin	Ireland	Point Theatre
March 31, 1994	Dublin	Ireland	Point Theatre
April 2, 1994	Dublin	Ireland	Point Theatre
April 3, 1994	Dublin	Ireland	Point Theatre
April 5, 1994	Dublin	Ireland	Point Theatre
April 6, 1994	Dublin	Ireland	Point Theatre
April 7, 1994	Dublin	Ireland	Point Theatre
April 9, 1994	Dublin	Ireland	Point Theatre
April 10, 1994	Birmingham	England	NEC Arena
April 11, 1994	London	England	Wembley Arena
April 14, 1994	Zürich	Switzerland	Hallenstadion
April 15, 1994	Frankfurt	Germany	Festhalle
April 17, 1994	Rotterdam	Netherlands	Sportpaleis van Ahoy
April 19, 1994	Frankfurt	Germany	Festhalle
April 22, 1994	Oslo	Norway	Oslo Spektrum
April 23, 1994	Stockholm	Sweden	Hovet Arena
North America Leg 4
July 14, 1994	Los Angeles	United States	Hollywood Bowl
Oceania
August 7, 1994	Auckland	New Zealand	Ericsson Stadium
August 25, 1994	Brisbane	Australia	Brisbane Entertainment Centre
August 26, 1994	Brisbane	Australia	Brisbane Entertainment Centre
August 28, 1994	Newcastle	Australia	Newcastle Entertainment Centre
August 29, 1994	Newcastle	Australia	Newcastle Entertainment Centre
August 30, 1994	Sydney	Australia	Sydney Entertainment Centre
August 31, 1994	Sydney	Australia	Sydney Entertainment Centre
September 2, 1994	Melbourne	Australia	National Tennis Centre
September 3, 1994	Adelaide	Australia	Adelaide Entertainment Arena
September 5, 1994	Perth	Australia	Perth Entertainment Centre
Europe Leg 2
September 22, 1994	Barcelona	Spain	Palau Sant Jordi
September 26, 1994	Munich	Germany	Olympiahalle
September 27, 1994	Stuttgart	Germany	Hanns-Martin-Schleyer-Halle
September 29, 1994	Dortmund	Germany	Westfalenhalle
September 30, 1994	Hamburg	Germany	Sporthalle
October 1, 1994	Hamburg	Germany	Sporthalle
October 3, 1994	Copenhagen	Denmark	Valby Hallen
October 5, 1994	Berlin	Germany	Deutschlandhalle
October 8, 1994	Aberdeen	Scotland	AECC Arena
October 11, 1994	Sheffield	England	Sheffield Arena

== Personnel ==
- Garth Brooks – vocals, acoustic guitar, electric guitar on "Callin' Baton Rouge", tenor saxophone on "One Night a Day"
- Ty England – acoustic guitar, backing vocals
- David Gant – fiddle, piano, synthesizers
- James Garver – electric guitar, electric banjo on "Callin' Baton Rouge", percussion, backing vocals
- Mark Greenwood – bass guitar, backing vocals
- Steve McClure – pedal steel guitar, electric guitar, dobro on "Callin' Baton Rouge"
- Debbie Nims – acoustic guitar, mandolin, percussion, backing vocals
- Mike Palmer – drums, percussion
- Betsy Smittle – bass guitar, acoustic guitar, backing vocals

== See also ==
- List of Garth Brooks concert tours
