= The Garth Brooks World Tour (1996–1998) =

1996–98 concert tour by Garth Brooks

- Tour by Garth Brooks
- Location: Europe, North America, South America
- Associated album: Fresh Horses, Sevens
- Start date: March 12, 1996
- End date: November 22, 1998
- Legs: 5
- No. of shows: 344
- Box office: US$105,000,000

Garth Brooks concert chronology
- The Garth Brooks World Tour (1993–1994); The Garth Brooks World Tour (1996–1998); Garth Brooks: Live in Kansas City (2007)

The Garth Brooks World Tour was a concert tour by American country music artist Garth Brooks. Launching in support of Brooks' albums, Fresh Horses (1995), and later Sevens (1997), the tour followed Brooks' 1993–1994 tour and also featured appearances by Trisha Yearwood. The tour ran from March 12, 1996, to November 22, 1998, for a total of 344 concerts. Even though this was Brooks' final concert tour before his retirement in 2001, it drew record-breaking crowds in North America, two places in Ireland, and one place in South America, becoming the third-most attended concert tour of all time, as well as one of the decade's highest-grossing concert tours.

== Background and content ==
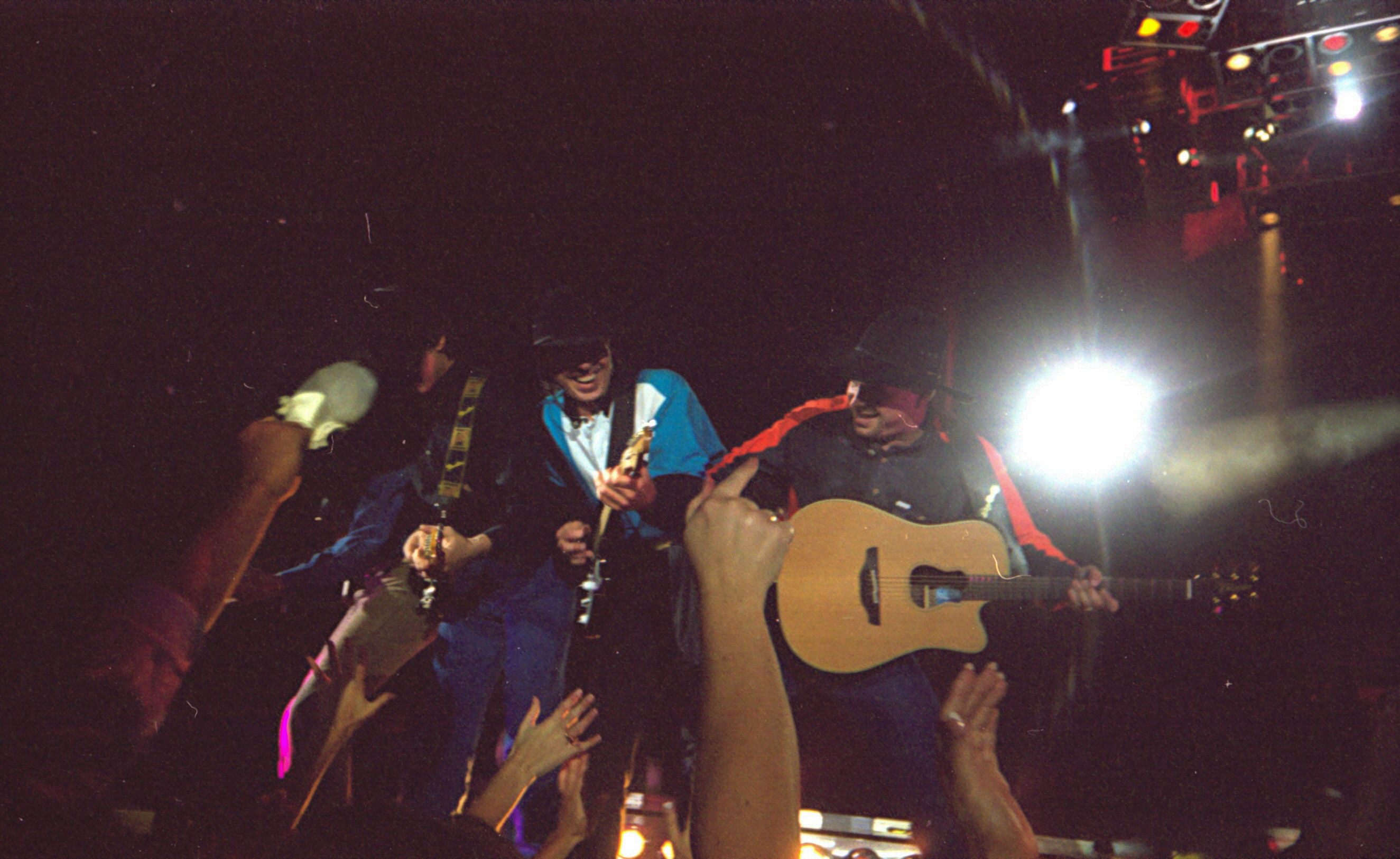
Brooks and band performs in 1998 at Freedom Hall in Louisville, Kentucky.

After his first successful world tour, Brooks embarked on his second, covering many cities at random throughout the United States and Canada, with appearances in Ireland and Brazil. Initially launching to support Brooks' 1995 album, Fresh Horses, it also began to feature songs from Sevens, released in 1997. The concerts' outline evolved as the set lists changed throughout the tour. Each show began with smoke-filled entrance by Brooks, appearing via hydraulic lift through a piano as the opening notes of "The Old Stuff" were played. Wearing a wireless microphone headset, Brooks proceeded to dance about the stage, performing a series of old and new songs. The high energy and pyrotechnics garnered comparison to hard rock performances by bands including Kiss, while still achieving a country atmosphere. Following the release of Brooks' album, Sevens, Trisha Yearwood began making periodic appearances to perform duets, such as "In Another's Eyes".

== Ticket sales and revenue ==
Brooks' 1996–1998 world tour continued the tradition established by his first tour, selling each ticket for the same price ($20), regardless of location in the venue. Because of this, demand was extremely high breaking many records worldwide, including arena ticket sales and attendance records. Concerts began selling out in minutes, resulting in such high demand that multiple shows were added for many cities. Many of these ticket sales and attendance records were broken by Brooks once again on his 2014 tour.

Despite each ticket costing well below the average ticket prices at the time, the tour managed to gross nearly $105 million worldwide, and is listed among the highest-grossing concert tours in the 1990s. Its total attendance, approximately 5.5 million, ranks fourth all-time (behind U2, Pink Floyd, and The Rolling Stones).

== Recordings ==
=== Audio ===
Portions of various concerts from the tour were recorded and released as a live album to coincide with the tour's conclusion. The two-disc release, called Double Live, went on to become the best-selling live album of all time, certified 23× Platinum by the RIAA, and is the seventh-most shipped album in United States music history.

=== Video ===
The tour's concerts in New York City's Central Park and Dublin's Croke Park were filmed for later broadcasting. Garth: Live from Central Park was a free concert attended by 980,000 fans, the most-attended concert in the park's history. Paying homage to Woodstock, the concert was dubbed "Garthstock", featuring appearances by Billy Joel and Don McLean. It was broadcast on HBO, receiving nearly 15 million live viewers, the most of any concert special that year, and it received six Emmy Award nominations. Garth Brooks: Ireland and Back, footage of the concert of May 16, 1997, was filmed and later broadcast on NBC with a live ending featuring Brooks performing songs from the newly released Sevens from Burbank, California, receiving 15.7 million viewers. Both specials were included in Brooks' The Entertainer DVD collection, released in 2006, with the Dublin concert being renamed “Garth Brooks: Live in Ireland”. While the live ending was not a part of the main show, a couple songs from the segment were put in the Special Features.

== Set list ==
This set list is representative of the performance of May 20, 1998 in Louisville, Kentucky. It does not represent all concerts for the duration of the series.

1. "The Old Stuff"
2. "Standing Outside the Fire"
3. "The Beaches of Cheyenne"
4. "Two Pina Coladas"
5. "Papa Loved Mama"
6. "We Shall Be Free"
7. "That Summer"
8. "Callin' Baton Rouge"
9. "Unanswered Prayers"
10. "The River"
11. "The Thunder Rolls"
12. "American Honky-Tonk Bar Association"
13. "In Another's Eyes" (duet with Trisha Yearwood)
14. "Walkaway Joe" (performed by Trisha Yearwood)
15. "The Fever"
16. "Friends in Low Places"
17. "The Dance"

Encores

18. "Ain't Goin' Down ('Til the Sun Comes Up)"
19. "Longneck Bottle"
20. "Two of a Kind, Workin' on a Full House"
21. "Much Too Young (To Feel This Damn Old)"
22. "American Pie" (Don McLean cover)

== Tour dates ==
List of concerts, showing date, number of shows, city, country, and venue
Date Number of shows	City	Country	Venue	Tickets Sold / Available	Revenue
Leg 1
March 12, 1996	Atlanta	United States	Omni Coliseum	83,293 / 83,293	$1,556,138
March 13, 1996	Atlanta	United States	Omni Coliseum	83,293 / 83,293	$1,556,138
March 14, 1996	Atlanta	United States	Omni Coliseum	83,293 / 83,293	$1,556,138
March 15, 1996	Atlanta	United States	Omni Coliseum	83,293 / 83,293	$1,556,138
March 16, 1996	Atlanta	United States	Omni Coliseum	83,293 / 83,293	$1,556,138
March 20, 1996	Cleveland	United States	Gund Arena	82,447 / 82,447	$1,572,667
March 21, 1996	Cleveland	United States	Gund Arena	82,447 / 82,447	$1,572,667
March 22, 1996	Cleveland	United States	Gund Arena	82,447 / 82,447	$1,572,667
March 23, 1996	Cleveland	United States	Gund Arena	82,447 / 82,447	$1,572,667
March 27, 1996	Indianapolis	United States	Market Square Arena	69,653 / 69,653	$1,165,571
March 28, 1996	Indianapolis	United States	Market Square Arena	69,653 / 69,653	$1,165,571
March 29, 1996	Indianapolis	United States	Market Square Arena	69,653 / 69,653	$1,165,571
March 30, 1996	Indianapolis	United States	Market Square Arena	69,653 / 69,653	$1,165,571
April 2, 1996	Landover	United States	USAir Arena	90,317 / 90,317	$1,762,294
April 3, 1996	Landover	United States	USAir Arena	90,317 / 90,317	$1,762,294
April 4, 1996	Landover	United States	USAir Arena	90,317 / 90,317	$1,762,294
April 5, 1996	Landover	United States	USAir Arena	90,317 / 90,317	$1,762,294
April 6, 1996	Landover	United States	USAir Arena	90,317 / 90,317	$1,762,294
April 9, 1996	East Lansing	United States	Breslin Center	28,850 / 28,850	$481,780
April 10, 1996	East Lansing	United States	Breslin Center	28,850 / 28,850	$481,780
April 11, 1996	Milwaukee	United States	Bradley Center	56,726 / 56,726	$998,594
April 12, 1996	Milwaukee	United States	Bradley Center	56,726 / 56,726	$998,594
April 13, 1996	Milwaukee	United States	Bradley Center	56,726 / 56,726	$998,594
April 18, 1996	Miami	United States	Miami Arena	46,665 / 46,665	$886,635
April 19, 1996	Miami	United States	Miami Arena	46,665 / 46,665	$886,635
April 20, 1996	Miami	United States	Miami Arena	46,665 / 46,665	$886,635
April 26, 1996	Manhattan	United States	Bramlage Coliseum	26,419 / 26,419	$474,246
April 27, 1996	Manhattan	United States	Bramlage Coliseum	26,419 / 26,419	$474,246
May 2, 1996	Kansas City	United States	Kemper Arena	66,400 / 66,400	$1,228,400
May 3, 1996	Kansas City	United States	Kemper Arena	66,400 / 66,400	$1,228,400
May 4, 1996	Kansas City	United States	Kemper Arena	66,400 / 66,400	$1,228,400
May 5, 1996	Kansas City	United States	Kemper Arena	66,400 / 66,400	$1,228,400
May 8, 1996	Auburn Hills	United States	The Palace of Auburn Hills	104,625 / 104,625	$1,859,850
May 9, 1996	Auburn Hills	United States	The Palace of Auburn Hills	104,625 / 104,625	$1,859,850
May 10, 1996	Auburn Hills	United States	The Palace of Auburn Hills	104,625 / 104,625	$1,859,850
May 11, 1996	Auburn Hills	United States	The Palace of Auburn Hills	104,625 / 104,625	$1,859,850
May 12, 1996	Auburn Hills	United States	The Palace of Auburn Hills	104,625 / 104,625	$1,859,850
May 16, 1996	Birmingham	United States	BJCC Coliseum	54,980 / 54,980	$978,656
May 17, 1996	Birmingham	United States	BJCC Coliseum	54,980 / 54,980	$978,656
May 18, 1996	Birmingham	United States	BJCC Coliseum	54,980 / 54,980	$978,656
May 30, 1996	Las Cruces	United States	Pan American Center	—N/a	—N/a
May 31, 1996	Las Cruces	United States	Pan American Center	—N/a	—N/a
June 2, 1996	Tucson	United States	McKale Center	26,860 / 26,860	$483,480
June 3, 1996	Tucson	United States	McKale Center	26,860 / 26,860	$483,480
June 6, 1996	Phoenix	United States	America West Arena	53,248 / 53,248	$958,464
June 7, 1996	Phoenix	United States	America West Arena	53,248 / 53,248	$958,464
June 8, 1996	Phoenix	United States	America West Arena	53,248 / 53,248	$958,464
June 13, 1996	San Diego	United States	San Diego Sports Arena	41,336 / 41,336	$805,467
June 14, 1996	San Diego	United States	San Diego Sports Arena	41,336 / 41,336	$805,467
June 15, 1996	San Diego	United States	San Diego Sports Arena	41,336 / 41,336	$805,467
June 19, 1996	Inglewood	United States	Great Western Forum	52,686 / 52,686	$934,074
June 20, 1996	Inglewood	United States	Great Western Forum	52,686 / 52,686	$934,074
June 21, 1996	Inglewood	United States	Great Western Forum	52,686 / 52,686	$934,074
June 22, 1996	Anaheim	United States	Arrowhead Pond of Anaheim	55,671 / 55,671	$987,228
June 23, 1996	Anaheim	United States	Arrowhead Pond of Anaheim	55,671 / 55,671	$987,228
June 24, 1996	Anaheim	United States	Arrowhead Pond of Anaheim	55,671 / 55,671	$987,228
June 26, 1996	Albuquerque	United States	Tingley Coliseum	—N/a	—N/a
June 27, 1996	Albuquerque	United States	Tingley Coliseum	—N/a	—N/a
June 28, 1996	Albuquerque	United States	Tingley Coliseum	—N/a	—N/a
July 18, 1996	Denver	United States	McNichols Sports Arena	—N/a	—N/a
July 19, 1996	Denver	United States	McNichols Sports Arena	—N/a	—N/a
July 20, 1996	Denver	United States	McNichols Sports Arena	—N/a	—N/a
July 25, 1996	Portland, OR	United States	Rose Garden Arena	—N/a	—N/a
July 26, 1996	Portland, OR	United States	Rose Garden Arena	—N/a	—N/a
July 27, 1996	Portland, OR	United States	Rose Garden Arena	—N/a	—N/a
August 1, 1996	Vancouver	Canada	General Motors Place	53,339 / 53,339	$912,143
August 2, 1996	Vancouver	Canada	General Motors Place	53,339 / 53,339	$912,143
August 3, 1996	Vancouver	Canada	General Motors Place	53,339 / 53,339	$912,143
August 7, 1996	Calgary	Canada	Canadian Airlines Saddledome	53,076 / 53,076	$909,101
August 8, 1996	Calgary	Canada	Canadian Airlines Saddledome	53,076 / 53,076	$909,101
August 9, 1996	Calgary	Canada	Canadian Airlines Saddledome	53,076 / 53,076	$909,101
August 10, 1996	Edmonton	Canada	Edmonton Coliseum	50,871 / 50,871	$872,924
August 11, 1996	Edmonton	Canada	Edmonton Coliseum	50,871 / 50,871	$872,924
August 12, 1996	Edmonton	Canada	Edmonton Coliseum	50,871 / 50,871	$872,924
August 14, 1996	Saskatoon	Canada	Saskatchewan Place	28,144 / 28,144	$514,780
August 15, 1996	Saskatoon	Canada	Saskatchewan Place	28,144 / 28,144	$514,780
August 17, 1996	Winnipeg	Canada	Winnipeg Arena	46,280 / 46,280	$935,375
August 18, 1996	Winnipeg	Canada	Winnipeg Arena	46,280 / 46,280	$935,375
August 19, 1996	Winnipeg	Canada	Winnipeg Arena	46,280 / 46,280	$935,375
August 27, 1996	Portland, ME	United States	Cumberland County Civic Center	40,684 / 40,684	$720,108
August 28, 1996	Portland, ME	United States	Cumberland County Civic Center	40,684 / 40,684	$720,108
August 29, 1996	Portland, ME	United States	Cumberland County Civic Center	40,684 / 40,684	$720,108
August 30, 1996	Portland, ME	United States	Cumberland County Civic Center	40,684 / 40,684	$720,108
August 31, 1996	Portland, ME	United States	Cumberland County Civic Center	40,684 / 40,684	$720,108
September 2, 1996	Ottawa	Canada	Corel Centre	36,892 / 36,892	$740,802
September 3, 1996	Ottawa	Canada	Corel Centre	36,892 / 36,892	$740,802
September 5, 1996	Hamilton	Canada	Copps Coliseum	—N/a	—N/a
September 6, 1996	Toronto	Canada	SkyDome	28,617 / 28,617	$800,510
September 7, 1996	Montreal	Canada	Molson Centre	—N/a	—N/a
September 9, 1996	Saint John	Canada	Harbour Station	—N/a	—N/a
September 10, 1996	Saint John	Canada	Harbour Station	—N/a	—N/a
September 11, 1996	Saint John	Canada	Harbour Station	—N/a	—N/a
September 12, 1996	Halifax	Canada	Halifax Metro Centre	39,592 / 39,592	$800,510
September 13, 1996	Halifax	Canada	Halifax Metro Centre	39,592 / 39,592	$800,510
September 14, 1996	Halifax	Canada	Halifax Metro Centre	39,592 / 39,592	$800,510
September 15, 1996	Halifax	Canada	Halifax Metro Centre	39,592 / 39,592	$800,510
October 3, 1996	Carbondale	United States	SIU Arena	28,335 / 28,335	$466,344
October 4, 1996	Carbondale	United States	SIU Arena	28,335 / 28,335	$466,344
October 5, 1996	Carbondale	United States	SIU Arena	28,335 / 28,335	$466,344
October 10, 1996	St. Louis	United States	Kiel Center	60,210 / 60,210	$1,069,980
October 11, 1996	St. Louis	United States	Kiel Center	60,210 / 60,210	$1,069,980
October 12, 1996	St. Louis	United States	Kiel Center	60,210 / 60,210	$1,069,980
October 17, 1996	Ames	United States	Hilton Coliseum	43,080 / 43,080	$784,234
October 18, 1996	Ames	United States	Hilton Coliseum	43,080 / 43,080	$784,234
October 19, 1996	Ames	United States	Hilton Coliseum	43,080 / 43,080	$784,234
November 1, 1996	Knoxville	United States	Thompson–Boling Arena	50,006 / 50,006	$895,382
November 2, 1996	Knoxville	United States	Thompson–Boling Arena	50,006 / 50,006	$895,382
November 13, 1996	Cincinnati	United States	Riverfront Coliseum	83,856 / 83,856	$1,487,808
November 14, 1996	Cincinnati	United States	Riverfront Coliseum	83,856 / 83,856	$1,487,808
November 15, 1996	Cincinnati	United States	Riverfront Coliseum	83,856 / 83,856	$1,487,808
November 16, 1996	Cincinnati	United States	Riverfront Coliseum	83,856 / 83,856	$1,487,808
November 17, 1996	Cincinnati	United States	Riverfront Coliseum	83,856 / 83,856	$1,487,808
December 5, 1996	Jackson	United States	Mississippi Coliseum	26,002 / 26,002	$441,125
December 6, 1996	Jackson	United States	Mississippi Coliseum	26,002 / 26,002	$441,125
December 7, 1996	Jackson	United States	Mississippi Coliseum	26,002 / 26,002	$441,125
December 13, 1996	Biloxi	United States	Mississippi Coast Coliseum	—N/a	—N/a
December 14, 1996	Biloxi	United States	Mississippi Coast Coliseum	—N/a	—N/a
December 15, 1996	Biloxi	United States	Mississippi Coast Coliseum	—N/a	—N/a
Leg 2
January 16, 1997	Shreveport	United States	Hirsch Memorial Coliseum	29,102 / 29,102	$522,755
January 17, 1997	Shreveport	United States	Hirsch Memorial Coliseum	29,102 / 29,102	$522,755
January 18, 1997	Shreveport	United States	Hirsch Memorial Coliseum	29,102 / 29,102	$522,755
January 23, 1997	Hampton	United States	Hampton Coliseum	—N/a	—N/a
January 24, 1997	Hampton	United States	Hampton Coliseum	—N/a	—N/a
January 25, 1997	Hampton	United States	Hampton Coliseum	—N/a	—N/a
January 30, 1997	North Charleston	United States	North Charleston Coliseum	35,610 / 35,610	$652,716
January 31, 1997	North Charleston	United States	North Charleston Coliseum	35,610 / 35,610	$652,716
February 1, 1997	North Charleston	United States	North Charleston Coliseum	35,610 / 35,610	$652,716
February 13, 1997	Charleston	United States	Charleston Civic Center	49,976 / 49,976	$907,407
February 14, 1997	Charleston	United States	Charleston Civic Center	49,976 / 49,976	$907,407
February 15, 1997	Charleston	United States	Charleston Civic Center	49,976 / 49,976	$907,407
February 16, 1997	Charleston	United States	Charleston Civic Center	49,976 / 49,976	$907,407
February 20, 1997	Richmond	United States	Richmond Coliseum	35,942 / 35,942	$644,132
February 21, 1997	Richmond	United States	Richmond Coliseum	35,942 / 35,942	$644,132
February 22, 1997	Richmond	United States	Richmond Coliseum	35,942 / 35,942	$644,132
February 27, 1997	Jacksonville	United States	Jacksonville Coliseum	56,648 / 56,648	$1,090,474
February 28, 1997	Jacksonville	United States	Jacksonville Coliseum	56,648 / 56,648	$1,090,474
March 1, 1997	Jacksonville	United States	Jacksonville Coliseum	56,648 / 56,648	$1,090,474
March 2, 1997	Jacksonville	United States	Jacksonville Coliseum	56,648 / 56,648	$1,090,474
March 3, 1997	Jacksonville	United States	Jacksonville Coliseum	56,648 / 56,648	$1,090,474
March 4, 1997	Jacksonville	United States	Jacksonville Coliseum	56,648 / 56,648	$1,090,474
March 7, 1997	Champaign	United States	Assembly Hall	49,412 / 49,412	$851,078
March 8, 1997	Champaign	United States	Assembly Hall	49,412 / 49,412	$851,078
March 9, 1997	Champaign	United States	Assembly Hall	49,412 / 49,412	$851,078
March 28, 1997	Columbia	United States	Carolina Coliseum	—N/a	—N/a
March 29, 1997	Columbia	United States	Carolina Coliseum	—N/a	—N/a
April 3, 1997	University Park	United States	Bryce Jordan Center	74,399 / 74,399	$1,339,182
April 4, 1997	University Park	United States	Bryce Jordan Center	74,399 / 74,399	$1,339,182
April 5, 1997	University Park	United States	Bryce Jordan Center	74,399 / 74,399	$1,339,182
April 6, 1997	University Park	United States	Bryce Jordan Center	74,399 / 74,399	$1,339,182
April 7, 1997	University Park	United States	Bryce Jordan Center	74,399 / 74,399	$1,339,182
April 10, 1997	Albany	United States	Pepsi Arena	47,356 / 47,356	$799,017
April 11, 1997	Albany	United States	Pepsi Arena	47,356 / 47,356	$799,017
April 12, 1997	Albany	United States	Pepsi Arena	47,356 / 47,356	$799,017
April 17, 1997	Boston	United States	FleetCenter	35,183 / 35,183	$591,719
April 18, 1997	Boston	United States	FleetCenter	35,183 / 35,183	$591,719
April 19, 1997	Worcester	United States	Worcester's Centrum Centre	56,696 / 56,696	$950,793
April 20, 1997	Worcester	United States	Worcester's Centrum Centre	56,696 / 56,696	$950,793
April 21, 1997	Worcester	United States	Worcester's Centrum Centre	56,696 / 56,696	$950,793
April 22, 1997	Worcester	United States	Worcester's Centrum Centre	56,696 / 56,696	$950,793
April 25, 1997	Syracuse	United States	Carrier Dome	53,526 / 53,526	$1,004,644
April 26, 1997	Syracuse	United States	Carrier Dome	53,526 / 53,526	$1,004,644
May 16, 1997 (Note: This concert was taped and later broadcast on NBC, receiving 15.7 million live viewers. It was included in Brooks' 2006 DVD compilation, The Entertainer.)	Dublin	Ireland	Croke Park	—N/a	—N/a
May 17, 1997	Dublin	Ireland	Croke Park	—N/a	—N/a
May 18, 1997	Dublin	Ireland	Croke Park	—N/a	—N/a
Leg 3
July 3, 1997	Oklahoma City	United States	Myriad Convention Center	43,388 / 43,388	$835,458
July 4, 1997	Oklahoma City	United States	Myriad Convention Center	43,388 / 43,388	$835,458
July 5, 1997	Oklahoma City	United States	Myriad Convention Center	43,388 / 43,388	$835,458
July 11, 1997	Amarillo	United States	Potter County Memorial Stadium	—N/a	—N/a
July 12, 1997	Amarillo	United States	Potter County Memorial Stadium	—N/a	—N/a
July 17, 1997	Tulsa	United States	Drillers Stadium	80,782 / 80,782	$1,557,173
July 18, 1997	Tulsa	United States	Drillers Stadium	80,782 / 80,782	$1,557,173
July 19, 1997	Tulsa	United States	Drillers Stadium	80,782 / 80,782	$1,557,173
July 20, 1997	Tulsa	United States	Drillers Stadium	80,782 / 80,782	$1,557,173
July 21, 1997	Tulsa	United States	Drillers Stadium	80,782 / 80,782	$1,557,173
July 26, 1997	Columbus	United States	Cooper Stadium	95,924 / 95,924	$1,804,601
July 27, 1997	Columbus	United States	Cooper Stadium	95,924 / 95,924	$1,804,601
July 28, 1997	Columbus	United States	Cooper Stadium	95,924 / 95,924	$1,804,601
July 29, 1997	Columbus	United States	Cooper Stadium	95,924 / 95,924	$1,804,601
July 30, 1997	Columbus	United States	Cooper Stadium	95,924 / 95,924	$1,804,601
August 14, 1997	Sacramento	United States	ARCO Arena	83,277 / 83,277	$1,478,160
August 15, 1997	Sacramento	United States	ARCO Arena	83,277 / 83,277	$1,478,160
August 16, 1997	Sacramento	United States	ARCO Arena	83,277 / 83,277	$1,478,160
August 17, 1997	Sacramento	United States	ARCO Arena	83,277 / 83,277	$1,478,160
August 18, 1997	Sacramento	United States	ARCO Arena	83,277 / 83,277	$1,478,160
August 21, 1997	Fresno	United States	Selland Arena	50,702 / 50,702	$900,018
August 22, 1997	Fresno	United States	Selland Arena	50,702 / 50,702	$900,018
August 23, 1997	Fresno	United States	Selland Arena	50,702 / 50,702	$900,018
August 24, 1997	Fresno	United States	Selland Arena	50,702 / 50,702	$900,018
August 25, 1997	Fresno	United States	Selland Arena	50,702 / 50,702	$900,018
August 29, 1997	San Jose	United States	San Jose Arena	53,509 / 53,509	$945,018
August 30, 1997	San Jose	United States	San Jose Arena	53,509 / 53,509	$945,018
August 31, 1997	San Jose	United States	San Jose Arena	53,509 / 53,509	$945,018
September 4, 1997	Reno	United States	Lawlor Events Center	—N/a	—N/a
September 5, 1997	Reno	United States	Lawlor Events Center	—N/a	—N/a
September 24, 1997	Lincoln	United States	Bob Devaney Sports Center	—N/a	—N/a
September 25, 1997	Lincoln	United States	Bob Devaney Sports Center	—N/a	—N/a
September 26, 1997	Lincoln	United States	Bob Devaney Sports Center	—N/a	—N/a
September 27, 1997	Lincoln	United States	Bob Devaney Sports Center	—N/a	—N/a
September 28, 1997	Lincoln	United States	Bob Devaney Sports Center	—N/a	—N/a
October 3, 1997	Rapid City	United States	Rushmore Plaza Civic Center	—N/a	—N/a
October 4, 1997	Rapid City	United States	Rushmore Plaza Civic Center	—N/a	—N/a
October 13, 1997	Pittsburgh	United States	Civic Arena	100,715 / 100,715	$1,925,462
October 14, 1997	Pittsburgh	United States	Civic Arena	100,715 / 100,715	$1,925,462
October 15, 1997	Pittsburgh	United States	Civic Arena	100,715 / 100,715	$1,925,462
October 16, 1997	Pittsburgh	United States	Civic Arena	100,715 / 100,715	$1,925,462
October 17, 1997	Pittsburgh	United States	Civic Arena	100,715 / 100,715	$1,925,462
October 18, 1997	Pittsburgh	United States	Civic Arena	100,715 / 100,715	$1,925,462
October 21, 1997	Rosemont	United States	Rosemont Horizon	107,525 / 107,525	$1,913,400
October 22, 1997	Rosemont	United States	Rosemont Horizon	107,525 / 107,525	$1,913,400
October 23, 1997	Rosemont	United States	Rosemont Horizon	107,525 / 107,525	$1,913,400
October 24, 1997	Rosemont	United States	Rosemont Horizon	107,525 / 107,525	$1,913,400
October 25, 1997	Rosemont	United States	Rosemont Horizon	107,525 / 107,525	$1,913,400
October 26, 1997	Rosemont	United States	Rosemont Horizon	107,525 / 107,525	$1,913,400
October 29, 1997	Sioux Falls	United States	Sioux Falls Arena	—N/a	—N/a
October 30, 1997	Sioux Falls	United States	Sioux Falls Arena	—N/a	—N/a
October 31, 1997	Sioux Falls	United States	Sioux Falls Arena	—N/a	—N/a
November 1, 1997	Sioux Falls	United States	Sioux Falls Arena	—N/a	—N/a
November 2, 1997	Sioux Falls	United States	Sioux Falls Arena	—N/a	—N/a
November 6, 1997	Bismarck	United States	Bismarck Civic Center	—N/a	—N/a
November 7, 1997	Bismarck	United States	Bismarck Civic Center	—N/a	—N/a
November 8, 1997	Bismarck	United States	Bismarck Civic Center	—N/a	—N/a
November 9, 1997	Bismarck	United States	Bismarck Civic Center	—N/a	—N/a
November 12, 1997	Valley Center	United States	Kansas Coliseum	—N/a	—N/a
November 13, 1997	Valley Center	United States	Kansas Coliseum	—N/a	—N/a
November 14, 1997	Valley Center	United States	Kansas Coliseum	—N/a	—N/a
November 15, 1997	Valley Center	United States	Kansas Coliseum	—N/a	—N/a
November 16, 1997	Valley Center	United States	Kansas Coliseum	—N/a	—N/a
December 18, 1997	Rosemont	United States	Rosemont Horizon	35,480 / 35,480	$638,640
December 19, 1997	Rosemont	United States	Rosemont Horizon	35,480 / 35,480	$638,640
Leg 4		United States			
February 13, 1998	Dallas	United States	Reunion Arena	50,213 / 52,000	$1,059,494
February 14, 1998	Dallas	United States	Reunion Arena	50,213 / 52,000	$1,059,494
February 15, 1998	Dallas	United States	Reunion Arena	50,213 / 52,000	$1,059,494
February 20, 1998	Fort Worth	United States	Fort Worth Convention Center	37,015 / 37,015	$781,015
February 21, 1998	Fort Worth	United States	Fort Worth Convention Center	37,015 / 37,015	$781,015
February 22, 1998	Fort Worth	United States	Fort Worth Convention Center	37,015 / 37,015	$781,015
March 5, 1998	Memphis	United States	The Pyramid Arena	60,885 / 60,885	$1,290,129
March 6, 1998	Memphis	United States	The Pyramid Arena	60,885 / 60,885	$1,290,129
March 7, 1998	Memphis	United States	The Pyramid Arena	60,885 / 60,885	$1,290,129
March 20, 1998	Charlotte	United States	Charlotte Coliseum	48,691 / 48,691	$960,180
March 21, 1998	Charlotte	United States	Charlotte Coliseum	48,691 / 48,691	$960,180
March 25, 1998	Winston-Salem	United States	LJVM Coliseum	57,512 / 57,512	$1,127,040
March 26, 1998	Winston-Salem	United States	LJVM Coliseum	57,512 / 57,512	$1,127,040
March 27, 1998	Winston-Salem	United States	LJVM Coliseum	57,512 / 57,512	$1,127,040
March 28, 1998	Winston-Salem	United States	LJVM Coliseum	57,512 / 57,512	$1,127,040
April 3, 1998	Chapel Hill	United States	Dean Smith Center	40,800 / 40,800	$802,040
April 4, 1998	Chapel Hill	United States	Dean Smith Center	40,800 / 40,800	$802,040
April 7, 1998	Houston	United States	Compaq Center	81,039 / 81,039	$1,673,455
April 8, 1998	Houston	United States	Compaq Center	81,039 / 81,039	$1,673,455
April 9, 1998	Houston	United States	Compaq Center	81,039 / 81,039	$1,673,455
April 10, 1998	Houston	United States	Compaq Center	81,039 / 81,039	$1,673,455
April 11, 1998	Houston	United States	Compaq Center	81,039 / 81,039	$1,673,455
April 14, 1998	San Antonio	United States	Alamodome	120,653 / 120,653	$2,594,040
April 15, 1998	San Antonio	United States	Alamodome	120,653 / 120,653	$2,594,040
April 16, 1998	San Antonio	United States	Alamodome	120,653 / 120,653	$2,594,040
April 17, 1998	San Antonio	United States	Alamodome	120,653 / 120,653	$2,594,040
April 18, 1998; 2 shows	San Antonio	United States	Alamodome	120,653 / 120,653	$2,594,040
April 23, 1998	Baton Rouge	United States	LSU Assembly Center	—N/a	—N/a
April 24, 1998	Baton Rouge	United States	LSU Assembly Center	—N/a	—N/a
April 25, 1998	Baton Rouge	United States	LSU Assembly Center	—N/a	—N/a
April 30, 1998	Evansville	United States	Roberts Municipal Stadium	46,502 / 46,502	$894,875
May 1, 1998	Evansville	United States	Roberts Municipal Stadium	46,502 / 46,502	$894,875
May 2, 1998	Evansville	United States	Roberts Municipal Stadium	46,502 / 46,502	$894,875
May 3, 1998	Evansville	United States	Roberts Municipal Stadium	46,502 / 46,502	$894,875
May 8, 1998	Nashville	United States	Nashville Arena	—N/a	—N/a
May 9, 1998	Nashville	United States	Nashville Arena	—N/a	—N/a
May 10, 1998	Nashville	United States	Nashville Arena	—N/a	—N/a
May 15, 1998	Lexington	United States	Rupp Arena	68,010 / 68,010	$1,380,368
May 16, 1998	Lexington	United States	Rupp Arena	68,010 / 68,010	$1,380,368
May 17, 1998	Lexington	United States	Rupp Arena	68,010 / 68,010	$1,380,368
May 20, 1998	Louisville	United States	Freedom Hall	—N/a	—N/a
May 21, 1998	Louisville	United States	Freedom Hall	—N/a	—N/a
May 22, 1998	Louisville	United States	Freedom Hall	—N/a	—N/a
May 23, 1998	Louisville	United States	Freedom Hall	—N/a	—N/a
Leg 5
July 2, 1998	Billings	United States	MetraPark Arena	—N/a	—N/a
July 3, 1998	Billings	United States	MetraPark Arena	—N/a	—N/a
July 4, 1998	Billings	United States	MetraPark Arena	—N/a	—N/a
July 5, 1998	Billings	United States	MetraPark Arena	—N/a	—N/a
July 9, 1998	Salt Lake City	United States	Delta Center	—N/a	—N/a
July 10, 1998	Salt Lake City	United States	Delta Center	—N/a	—N/a
July 11, 1998	Salt Lake City	United States	Delta Center	—N/a	—N/a
July 12, 1998	Salt Lake City	United States	Delta Center	—N/a	—N/a
July 15, 1998	Seattle	United States	KeyArena	—N/a	—N/a
July 16, 1998	Seattle	United States	KeyArena	—N/a	—N/a
July 17, 1998	Seattle	United States	KeyArena	—N/a	—N/a
July 18, 1998	Seattle	United States	KeyArena	—N/a	—N/a
July 19, 1998	Seattle	United States	KeyArena	—N/a	—N/a
July 20, 1998	Seattle	United States	KeyArena	—N/a	—N/a
July 23, 1998	Spokane	United States	Spokane Arena	—N/a	—N/a
July 24, 1998	Spokane	United States	Spokane Arena	—N/a	—N/a
July 25, 1998	Spokane	United States	Spokane Arena	—N/a	—N/a
July 26, 1998	Spokane	United States	Spokane Arena	—N/a	—N/a
July 27, 1998	Spokane	United States	Spokane Arena	—N/a	—N/a
August 7, 1998	Casper	United States	Casper Events Center	—N/a	—N/a
August 8, 1998	Casper	United States	Casper Events Center	—N/a	—N/a
August 9, 1998	Casper	United States	Casper Events Center	—N/a	—N/a
August 13, 1998	Las Vegas	United States	Thomas & Mack Center	—N/a	—N/a
August 14, 1998	Las Vegas	United States	Thomas & Mack Center	—N/a	—N/a
August 15, 1998	Las Vegas	United States	Thomas & Mack Center	—N/a	—N/a
August 16, 1998	Las Vegas	United States	Thomas & Mack Center	—N/a	—N/a
September 8, 1998	Philadelphia	United States	First Union Center	115,212 / 115,212	$2,509,672
September 9, 1998	Philadelphia	United States	First Union Center	115,212 / 115,212	$2,509,672
September 10, 1998	Philadelphia	United States	First Union Center	115,212 / 115,212	$2,509,672
September 11, 1998	Philadelphia	United States	First Union Center	115,212 / 115,212	$2,509,672
September 12, 1998	Philadelphia	United States	First Union Center	115,212 / 115,212	$2,509,672
September 13, 1998	Philadelphia	United States	First Union Center	115,212 / 115,212	$2,509,672
September 18, 1998	Fargo	United States	Fargodome	—N/a	—N/a
September 19, 1998	Fargo	United States	Fargodome	—N/a	—N/a
September 20, 1998	Fargo	United States	Fargodome	—N/a	—N/a
September 23, 1998	Buffalo	United States	Marine Midland Arena	111,480 / 111,480	$2,156,544
September 24, 1998	Buffalo	United States	Marine Midland Arena	111,480 / 111,480	$2,156,544
September 25, 1998	Buffalo	United States	Marine Midland Arena	111,480 / 111,480	$2,156,544
September 26, 1998	Buffalo	United States	Marine Midland Arena	111,480 / 111,480	$2,156,544
September 27, 1998	Buffalo	United States	Marine Midland Arena	111,480 / 111,480	$2,156,544
September 28, 1998	Buffalo	United States	Marine Midland Arena	111,480 / 111,480	$2,156,544
October 1, 1998	Quebec City	Canada	Colisée de Québec	12,216 / 12,216	$262,033
October 2, 1998	Montreal	Canada	Centre Molson	34,110 / 34,110	$731,660
October 3, 1998	Montreal	Canada	Centre Molson	34,110 / 34,110	$731,660
October 6, 1998	Minneapolis	United States	Target Center	163,791 / 163,791	$3,500,609
October 7, 1998	Minneapolis	United States	Target Center	163,791 / 163,791	$3,500,609
October 8, 1998	Minneapolis	United States	Target Center	163,791 / 163,791	$3,500,609
October 9, 1998	Minneapolis	United States	Target Center	163,791 / 163,791	$3,500,609
October 10, 1998	Minneapolis	United States	Target Center	163,791 / 163,791	$3,500,609
October 11, 1998	Minneapolis	United States	Target Center	163,791 / 163,791	$3,500,609
October 12, 1998	Minneapolis	United States	Target Center	163,791 / 163,791	$3,500,609
October 13, 1998	Minneapolis	United States	Target Center	163,791 / 163,791	$3,500,609
October 14, 1998	Minneapolis	United States	Target Center	163,791 / 163,791	$3,500,609
October 21, 1998	Orlando	United States	Orlando Arena	85,390 / 85,390	$1,698,300
October 22, 1998	Orlando	United States	Orlando Arena	85,390 / 85,390	$1,698,300
October 23, 1998	Orlando	United States	Orlando Arena	85,390 / 85,390	$1,698,300
October 24, 1998	Orlando	United States	Orlando Arena	85,390 / 85,390	$1,698,300
October 25, 1998	Orlando	United States	Orlando Arena	85,390 / 85,390	$1,698,300
October 28, 1998	Tampa	United States	Ice Palace	77,636 / 77,636	$1,615,488
October 29, 1998	Tampa	United States	Ice Palace	77,636 / 77,636	$1,615,488
October 30, 1998	Tampa	United States	Ice Palace	77,636 / 77,636	$1,615,488
October 31, 1998	Tampa	United States	Ice Palace	77,636 / 77,636	$1,615,488
November 11, 1998	Belfast	Northern Ireland	King's Hall	—N/a	—N/a
November 12, 1998	Belfast	Northern Ireland	King's Hall	—N/a	—N/a
November 13, 1998	Belfast	Northern Ireland	King's Hall	—N/a	—N/a
November 14, 1998	Belfast	Northern Ireland	King's Hall	—N/a	—N/a
November 15, 1998	Belfast	Northern Ireland	King's Hall	—N/a	—N/a
November 19, 1998	College Station	United States	Reed Arena	37,831 / 37,831	$757,087
November 21, 1998	College Station	United States	Reed Arena	37,831 / 37,831	$757,087
November 22, 1998	College Station	United States	Reed Arena	37,831 / 37,831	$757,087

=== Special concerts ===
List of concerts, showing date, city, country, and venue
Date Number of shows	City	Country	Venue
July 22, 1996	Cheyenne	United States	Cheyenne Frontier Days
August 7, 1997 (Note: This concert was free of charge, and it remains the largest concert ever held at the park. It was taped, broadcast on HBO, and included in Brooks' 2006 DVD compilation, The Entertainer.)	New York City	United States	Central Park
August 22, 1998	Barretos	Brazil	Festa do Peão de Boiadeiro

== Personnel ==
- Garth Brooks – vocals, acoustic guitar, electric guitar on "Callin' Baton Rouge"
- Stephanie Davis – acoustic guitar, backing vocals
- David Gant – piano, synthesizers
- James Garver – electric guitar, electric banjo on "Callin' Baton Rouge", backing vocals
- Mark Greenwood – bass guitar, backing vocals
- Jimmy Mattingly – fiddle, acoustic guitar
- Steve McClure – pedal steel guitar, electric guitar, acoustic guitar on "Callin' Baton Rouge"
- Debbie Nims – acoustic guitar, mandolin, percussion, backing vocals
- Mike Palmer – drums, percussion

== See also ==
- List of highest-grossing concert tours
- List of most-attended concert tours
- List of Garth Brooks concert tours
