= The Hits (Garth Brooks album) =

Greatest hits album by Garth Brooks
- Released: December 13, 1994
- Genre: Country
- Length: 66:08
- Label: Liberty
- Producer: Allen Reynolds

Garth Brooks chronology
The Garth Brooks Collection (1994)	The Hits (1994)	Fresh Horses (1995)

Professional ratings
Review scores
Source	Rating
AllMusic	5/5 stars
Christgau's Consumer Guide	A
Entertainment Weekly	B+
The Rolling Stone Album Guide	4.5/5 stars

The Hits is the second compilation album, and first greatest hits album, from American country music artist Garth Brooks, released on December 13, 1994, by Liberty.

Brooks' first compilation album, The Garth Brooks Collection, was released three months earlier exclusively at McDonald's restaurants for a limited time to raise money for the Ronald McDonald Children's Charities.

The Hits is now out of print due to Brooks' views for whole record sales, instead of albums of singles. He insisted it only be available for a limited time, but not before it sold well over 10 million copies (which at that time became his first album to achieve Diamond Series).

The album debuted at #1 on the Billboard 200, and Top Country Albums. A CD Zoom containing 20-second sound bites of 61 songs accompanied The Hits. In June 1995, the master was buried under Brooks' star on the Hollywood Walk of Fame.

== Track listing ==
The Hits – Standard edition
No.	Title	Writer(s)	Length
1.	"Ain't Goin' Down ('Til the Sun Comes Up)" (from In Pieces, 1993)	Kent Blazy, Kim Williams, Garth Brooks	4:32
2.	"Friends in Low Places" (from No Fences, 1990)	Dewayne Blackwell, Earl "Bud" Lee	4:18
3.	"Callin' Baton Rouge" (from In Pieces, 1993)	Dennis Linde	2:38
4.	"The River" (from Ropin' the Wind, 1991)	Victoria Shaw, Brooks	4:25
5.	"Much Too Young (To Feel This Damn Old)" (from Garth Brooks, 1989)	Randy Taylor, Brooks	2:53
6.	"The Thunder Rolls" (from No Fences, 1990)	Pat Alger, Brooks	3:42
7.	"American Honky-Tonk Bar Association" (from In Pieces, 1993)	Bryan Kennedy, Jim Rushing	3:33
8.	"If Tomorrow Never Comes" (from Garth Brooks, 1989)	Kent Blazy, Brooks	3:37
9.	"Unanswered Prayers" (from No Fences, 1990)	Alger, Larry Bastian, Brooks	3:23
10.	"Standing Outside the Fire" (from In Pieces, 1993)	Jenny Yates, Brooks	3:52
11.	"Rodeo" (from Ropin' the Wind, 1991)	Larry Bastian	3:53
12.	"What She's Doing Now" (from Ropin' the Wind, 1991)	Alger, Brooks	3:26
13.	"We Shall Be Free" (from The Chase, 1992)	Stephanie Davis, Brooks	3:48
14.	"Papa Loved Mama" (from Ropin' the Wind, 1991)	Williams, Brooks	2:51
15.	"Shameless" (from Ropin' the Wind, 1991)	Billy Joel	4:19
16.	"Two of a Kind, Workin' on a Full House" (from No Fences, 1990)	Bobby Boyd, Warren Haynes, Dennis Robbins	2:31
17.	"That Summer" (from The Chase, 1992)	Alger, Sandy Mahl, Brooks	4:47
18.	"The Dance" (from Garth Brooks, 1989)	Tony Arata	3:40
Total length:			66:08

The Hits – European edition
No.	Title	Writer(s)	Length
1.	"Ain't Goin' Down ('Til the Sun Comes Up)" (from In Pieces, 1993)	Kent Blazy, Kim Williams, Garth Brooks	4:32
2.	"Friends in Low Places" (from No Fences, 1990)	Dewayne Blackwell, Earl "Bud" Lee	4:18
3.	"Burning Bridges" (from Ropin' the Wind, 1991)	Stephanie C. Brown, Brooks	3:35
4.	"Callin' Baton Rouge" (from Ropin' the Wind, 1991)	Dennis Linde	2:38
5.	"The River" (from Ropin' the Wind, 1991)	Victoria Shaw, Brooks	4:25
6.	"Much Too Young (To Feel This Damn Old)" (from Garth Brooks, 1989)	Randy Taylor, Brooks	2:53
7.	"The Thunder Rolls" (from Garth Brooks, 1989)	Pat Alger, Brooks	3:42
8.	"American Honky-Tonk Bar Association" (from In Pieces, 1993)	Bryan Kennedy, Jim Rushing	3:33
9.	"If Tomorrow Never Comes" (from Garth Brooks, 1989)	Kent Blazy, Brooks	3:37
10.	"Unanswered Prayers" (from No Fences, 1990)	Alger, Larry Bastian, Brooks	3:23
11.	"Standing Outside the Fire" (from In Pieces, 1993)	Jenny Yates, Brooks	3:52
12.	"Rodeo" (from Ropin' the Wind, 1991)	Larry Bastian	3:53
13.	"What She's Doing Now" (from Ropin' the Wind, 1991)	Alger, Brooks	3:26
14.	"We Shall Be Free" (from The Chase, 1992)	Stephanie Davis, Brooks	3:48
15.	"Papa Loved Mama" (from Ropin' the Wind, 1991)	Williams, Brooks	2:51
16.	"Shameless" (from Ropin' the Wind, 1991)	Billy Joel	4:19
17.	"Two of a Kind, Workin' on a Full House" (from No Fences, 1990)	Bobby Boyd, Warren Haynes, Dennis Robbins	2:31
18.	"That Summer" (from The Chase, 1992)	Alger, Sandy Mahl, Brooks	4:47
19.	"The Red Strokes" (from In Pieces, 1993)	James Garver, Lisa Sanderson, Yates, Brooks	3:44
20.	"The Dance" (from Garth Brooks, 1989)	Tony Arata	3:40
Total length:			73:27

== Charts ==
The Hits debuted at number 1 on the US Billboard 200, becoming his fourth number-one album, and atop the Top Country Albums chart, becoming his fifth country chart-topping album. In November 1998, The Hits was certified 10× Platinum by the RIAA.

=== Weekly charts ===
Chart (1994–1995)	Peak position
Australian Albums (ARIA)	2
Austrian Albums (Ö3 Austria)	35
Canadian Albums (RPM)	7
Canadian Country Albums (RPM)	3
Dutch Albums (Album Top 100)	64
European Albums (Billboard)	20
German Albums (Offizielle Top 100)	19
Irish Albums (Billboard)	1
New Zealand Albums (RMNZ)	15
Norwegian Albums (VG-lista)	3
Scottish Albums (Official Charts)	13
Spanish Albums Chart	24
Swiss Albums (Schweizer Hitparade)	17
UK Albums (Official Charts)	11
US Billboard 200	1
US Top Country Albums (Billboard)	1
Zimbabwean Albums Chart	5

=== Year-end charts ===
Chart (1995)	Position
Australian Albums (ARIA)	36
UK Albums (OCC)	92
US Billboard 200	2
US Top Country Albums (Billboard)	1

Chart (1996)	Position
US Billboard 200	46
US Top Country Albums (Billboard)	9

Chart (1997)	Position
US Top Country Albums (Billboard)	51

=== Decade-end charts ===
Chart (1990–1999)	Position
US Billboard 200	24

== Certifications and sales ==
Region	Certification	Certified units/sales
Australia (ARIA)	Platinum	70,000^{^}
Canada (Music Canada)	Diamond	1,000,000^{^}
Norway	—	60,000
United Kingdom (BPI)	Gold	100,000^{^}
United States (RIAA)	Diamond	10,000,000^{^}
^{^} Shipments figures based on certification alone.
