= The Garth Brooks Irish Tour =

Upcoming concert tour by American country music singer Garth Brooks

- Tour by Garth Brooks
- Location: Ireland; Northern Ireland
- Start date: May 21, 2027
- End date: June 19, 2027
- Legs: 1
- No. of shows: 11

Garth Brooks concert chronology
- The Blame It All On My Roots Tour (2026–present); The Garth Brooks Irish Tour (2027)

The Garth Brooks Irish Tour is an upcoming concert tour by American country music singer Garth Brooks. It is scheduled to comprise eleven concerts at five venues on the island of Ireland, beginning in Belfast on May 21, 2027, and concluding in Cork on June 19, 2027. The Irish Tour is scheduled to run concurrently with Brooks' ongoing arena tour, The Blame It All On My Roots Tour.

== Background ==
Irish media have described Brooks as having a particularly strong connection with Ireland, with a large fan base dating to the 1990s. His Irish touring history began in 1994, when The Garth Brooks World Tour featured eight nights at the Point Depot in Dublin, drawing 68,000 people. Brooks subsequently included the song "Ireland" as the closing track on his 1995 album, Fresh Horses, describing it as a "heartfelt thank you" for the reception received during his 1994 Dublin concerts.

Brooks returned Dublin on his 1997 World Tour for three concerts at Croke Park, with more than 120,000 people in attendance. Footage from the performance was broadcast as Garth Brooks: Ireland and Back, an NBC television special, in 1998. It was later included in Brooks' 2006 video collection The Entertainer, as Live from Dublin. Brooks then played five sold-out shows in five consecutive nights at King's Hall in Belfast in November 1998, marking his final performances on the island before his 2000 self-imposed retirement.

Brooks' planned five-show return to Croke Park as part of his return to touring in 2014 was canceled after Dublin City Council licensed only three concerts, with Brooks declined to perform a partial run. He later performed five concerts at the venue in September 2022 as part of The Garth Brooks Stadium Tour, selling more than 400,000 tickets. After the 2022 shows, Brooks said he hoped to return to Ireland, speaking favorably of Ed Sheeran's "+−=÷× Tour" itinerary following Croke Park performances with dates around the country.

Brooks announced the 2027 dates on November 5, 2026, comprising two concerts each in various locations throughout the island.

=== Ticket sales ===
Tickets for the initial ten concerts went on general sale on November 12, 2026. The two originally announced Belfast concerts sold out, prompting Brooks and Aiken Promotions to add a third show at Boucher Road Playing Fields on May 23, 2027. The addition brought the announced itinerary to eleven total concerts, with Belfast scheduled for three dates and each of the other four cities for two. The general sale saw more than 300,000 tickets sold, while Irish reports noted brisk demand across the five counties, limited hotel availability, and increased room rates.

== Tour dates ==
List of 2027 concerts, showing date, number of shows, city, country, and venue
Date	City	Country	Venue
May 21	Belfast	Northern Ireland	Boucher Road Playing Fields
May 22	Belfast	Northern Ireland	Boucher Road Playing Fields
May 23	Belfast	Northern Ireland	Boucher Road Playing Fields
May 29	Galway	Ireland	Pearse Stadium
May 30	Galway	Ireland	Pearse Stadium
June 4	Kilkenny	Ireland	UPMC Nowlan Park
June 5	Kilkenny	Ireland	UPMC Nowlan Park
June 11	Limerick	Ireland	TUS Gaelic Grounds
June 12	Limerick	Ireland	TUS Gaelic Grounds
June 18	Cork	Ireland	SuperValu Páirc Uí Chaoimh
June 19	Cork	Ireland	SuperValu Páirc Uí Chaoimh
