= One Night a Day =

Single by Garth Brooks

from the album In Pieces
- B-side: "Mr. Blue"
- Released: May 2, 1994
- Studio: Jack's Tracks (Nashville, Tennessee)
- Genre: Country; country pop
- Length: 4:16
- Label: Liberty 17972
- Songwriters: Gary Burr, Pete Wasner
- Producer: Allen Reynolds

Garth Brooks singles chronology
"Standing Outside The Fire" (1993)	"One Night a Day" (1994)	"Hard Luck Woman" (1994)

"One Night a Day" is a song recorded by American country music artist Garth Brooks. It was released in May 1994 as the fourth single from his album In Pieces and also appears on The Limited Series. A live version of the song appears on The Road album in Brooks' 2016 box set, The Ultimate Collection. The song was written by Gary Burr and Pete Wasner. This song, predominantly featuring the piano and saxophone, is noted for its unique jazz stylings.

== Content ==
This song features just piano, saxophone (played by Jim Horn), bass guitar and drums. The lyrics of the song talk about how the narrator gets through the nights after his lover has left him. Several ways he copes includes talking to himself, listening to the radio, calling up friends in the middle of the night to let them know he's OK and staying up with the Late Show.

== Critical reception ==
Deborah Evans Price, of Billboard magazine reviewed the song favorably, saying that Brooks "leaves the honky-tonk behind and steps briefly into the cocktail lounge." She goes on to say that he adopts a "slick, un-country singing style for this broken-hearted lament."

== Track listing ==
Australian CD single EMI, 1994

1. "One Night a Day" - 4:14
2. "If Tomorrow Never Comes" - 3:37
3. "Callin' Baton Rouge" - 2:35

US 7" single Capitol Nashville S7-17972-A, 1994

1. "One Night a Day"
2. "Mr. Blue"

== Chart performance ==
"One Night a Day" reached number 7 on the Billboard Hot Country Songs chart and number 14 on the Canadian RPM Country Tracks chart.

Chart (1994)	Peak position
Australian Singles Chart	35
Canada Country Singles (RPM)	14
US Hot Country Songs (Billboard)	7
