= The Garth Brooks Collection =

Compilation album by Garth Brooks
- Released: September 2, 1994
- Genre: Country
- Length: 33:53
- Label: Capitol Nashville
- Producer: Allen Reynolds

Garth Brooks chronology
In Pieces (1993)	The Garth Brooks Collection (1994)	The Hits (1994)

The Garth Brooks Collection is the first compilation album of American country music artist Garth Brooks. It was released on September 2, 1994, and contains 10 of Brooks' favorite songs, including his debut single, "Much Too Young (To Feel This Damn Old)".

== Track listing ==
No.	Title	Writer(s)	Length
1.	"Against the Grain" (from Ropin' the Wind, 1991)	Bruce Bouton; Larry Cordle; Carl Jackson	2:20
2.	"New Way to Fly" (from No Fences, 1990)	Kim Williams; Brooks	3:54
3.	"Much Too Young (To Feel This Damn Old)" (from Garth Brooks, 1989)	Randy Taylor; Brooks	2:53
4.	"Every Now and Then" (from The Chase, 1992)	Buddy Mondlock; Brooks	4:15
5.	"Mr. Right" (from The Chase, 1992)	Brooks	2:00
6.	"Alabama Clay" (from Garth Brooks, 1989)	Cordle; Ronny Scaife	4:18
7.	"Wild Horses" (from No Fences, 1990)	Bill Shore; David Wills	3:08
8.	"Cold Shoulder" (from Ropin' the Wind, 1991)	Kent Blazy; Williams; Brooks	3:56
9.	"The Night I Called the Old Man Out" (from In Pieces, 1993)	Pat Alger; Williams; Brooks	3:11
10.	"The Cowboy Song" (from In Pieces, 1993)	Roy Robinson	3:58
Total length:			33:53

== Certifications ==
Region	Certification	Certified units/sales
United States (RIAA)	3× Platinum	3,000,000^{^}
^{^} Shipments figures based on certification alone.
