= Ain't Goin' Down ('Til the Sun Comes Up) =

"Ain't Going Down ('Til the Sun Comes Up)"

Single by Garth Brooks

from the album In Pieces
- B-side: "Kickin' and Screamin'"
- Released: July 26, 1993
- Studio: Jack's Tracks (Nashville, Tennessee)
- Genre: Country, country rock
- Length: 4:32
- Label: Liberty 17496
- Songwriter: Kent Blazy Garth Brooks Kim Williams
- Producer: Allen Reynolds

Garth Brooks singles chronology
"That Summer" (1993)	"Ain't Going Down ('Til the Sun Comes Up)" (1993)	"American Honky-Tonk Bar Association" (1993)

"Ain't Going Down ('Til the Sun Comes Up)" is a song co-written and recorded by American country music artist Garth Brooks. It was released in July 1993 as the lead single from his album In Pieces. The song also appears on The Hits, The Limited Series, The Ultimate Hits, Double Live, and Triple Live. The spelling of the song has varied from album to album, and is also spelled "Ain't Going Down (Til the Sun Comes Up)." The song was written by Brooks, Kent Blazy, and Kim Williams. It is in the key of G Major.

Brooks has performed the song live since 1993, with high-energy arrangements including aerial flight over the audience, water bottle tossing, drum riser antics, and elevating band platforms. The live presentation has been cited as an example of Brooks' influence on country concert staging, remaining a staple of his live performances.

== Content ==
A girl heads out for a Friday evening date at 6:00 in the evening. Her mother tells her to be back in bed before dawn. After the teenagers see a show and get a bite to eat, they head out for some late-night dancing. Eventually, they spend the night there and head out to her house at 4:00 A.M. The girl does not get home in time, and is grounded and punished with chores, but sneaks out again at 6:00 P.M. the next evening.

== Writing and production ==
Garth provided the following background information on the song in the CD booklet liner notes from The Hits:

"Kent Blazy, Kim Williams, and I sat out on the back porch of Kent and Sharon Blazy's house and decided we wanted to write something that was a lot of fun, for no other reason than just that, fun. "Ain't Going Down (Til the Sun Comes Up)" is what we came up with. Kent and Sharon had just moved into their new home and this was the first song we had ever written at their house. They still reside there, and hopefully there are a lot more songs on that back porch."

Mark Casstevens played acoustic guitar, Chris Leuzinger played electric guitar, Milton Sledge played drums, Mike Chapman played bass guitar, Rob Hajacos played fiddle, Bobby Wood played electric piano, Terry McMillan played harmonica, and Trisha Yearwood provided harmony vocals.

== Live performances ==
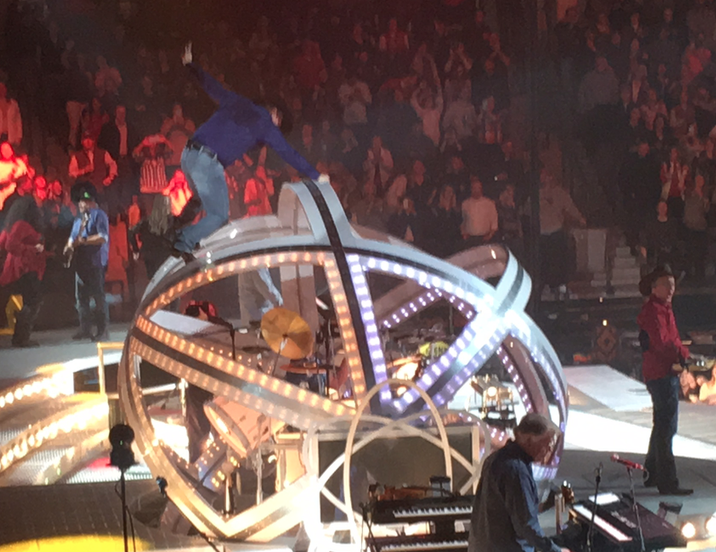
Brooks dances atop the drummer's sphere during the song's performance on his 2014–2017 World Tour.

Brooks' early live performances of the song used aerial and climbing stunts. During the 1993 World Tour performance at Texas Stadium, filmed for NBC's This Is Garth Brooks, Too! special, Brooks was lifted above the audience and glided across the stadium during the song. He later recalled that the Foy Flyers carried him about 100 yards from the stage toward the back rows. The performance was included in the 2006 DVD collection The Entertainer.

A review of the 1996 World Tour performance in Roanoke, Virginia described Brooks climbing a ladder suspended from the stage lighting during the encore performance; Brooks stated he had kept the stunt in the show for four years.

On the 2014–17 World Tour, the song remained a high-energy part of the show. A 2015 review reported Brooks splashing water around the stage, throwing bottles into the crowd, climbing onto the drum riser and interacting with a camera operator during the performance.

In 2026, The Blame It All On My Roots Tour reviews describe the song alongside its elevated staging. Platforms carrying the drummers and keyboardists rose above the stage, while the drum pod rotated overhead.

== Chart performance ==
"Ain't Going Down ('Til The Sun Comes Up)" debuted at number 37 on the U.S. Billboard Hot Country Singles & Tracks for the week of August 7, 1993. The song reached Number One on the Billboard Hot Country Songs chart for the week of September 18, 1993. The song then fell to No. 2 on September 25, 1993, when Tracy Byrd's "Holdin' Heaven" climbed to No. 1. However, on the chart week of October 2, 1993, "Ain't Going Down" returned to No. 1.

Chart (1993)	Peak position
Canada Country Singles (RPM)	1
Europe (Eurochart Hot 100)	32
Irish Singles Chart	7
UK Singles Chart	13
US Hot Country Songs (Billboard)	1

=== Year-end charts ===
Chart (1993)	Position
Canada Country Tracks (RPM)	12
US Country Songs (Billboard)	7
