= American Honky-Tonk Bar Association =

Single by Garth Brooks

from the album In Pieces
- B-side: "Every Time That It Rains"
- Released: September 7, 1993
- Studio: Jack's Tracks (Nashville, Tennessee)
- Genre: Country, rockabilly
- Length: 3:33
- Label: Liberty 17639
- Songwriters: Bryan Kennedy, Jim Rushing
- Producer: Allen Reynolds

Garth Brooks singles chronology
"Ain't Going Down ('Til the Sun Comes Up)" (1993)	"American Honky-Tonk Bar Association" (1993)	"Standing Outside the Fire" (1993)

"American Honky-Tonk Bar Association" is a song written by Bryan Kennedy and Jim Rushing and recorded by American country music singer Garth Brooks. It was released in September 1993 as the second single from his album In Pieces. The song reached the top of the Billboard Hot Country Singles & Tracks (now Hot Country Songs) chart.

== Background ==
The song was originally titled "American Redneck Bar Association.". Brooks provided the following background information on the song in the CD booklet liner notes from The Hits:

Introducing the song at a live performance, Brooks described it as one of the livelier moments of his show. He said its writers, Jim Rushing and Bryan Kennedy, had been close friends since he moved to Nashville, and that Kennedy was among the first people he met at The Bluebird Cafe, where he was introduced to Kennedy's father, Jerry Kennedy.

== Content ==
This song is an uptempo honky-tonk anthem that compares bars to fraternal organizations or support groups for blue collar people. The song's title name is a pun on the name American Bar Association.

== Critical reception ==
Mike Greenblatt of Modern Screen's Country Music referred to the song as a "modern day redneck classic sung with a snarl and a smile— except that ill-advised line about welfare recipients."

== Chart positions ==
Chart (1993–1994)	Peak position
Canada Country Singles (RPM)	2
US Hot Country Songs (Billboard)	1

=== Year-end charts ===
Chart (1993)	Position
Canada Country Tracks (RPM)	100

Chart (1994)	Position
Canada Country Tracks (RPM)	47
