= The Red Strokes =

Single by Garth Brooks

from the album In Pieces
- B-side: "Burning Bridges"
- Released: November 15, 1994
- Studio: Jack's Tracks (Nashville, Tennessee)
- Genre: Country
- Length: 3:44 (album version)
- Label: Liberty
- Songwriters: James Garver, Lisa Sanderson, Jenny Yates, Garth Brooks
- Producer: Allen Reynolds

Garth Brooks singles chronology
"Callin' Baton Rouge" (1994)	"The Red Strokes" (1994)	"She's Every Woman" (1995)

Part 2 Cover

"The Red Strokes" is a single by country music artist Garth Brooks from his album, In Pieces. While only charting on the country charts in the U.S. (#49) and Canada (#38) as an album cut, it became one of his most popular songs in the United Kingdom, peaking at #13. This song has not been featured on any of Brooks's greatest hits albums in the United States. However, the dramatic ACM award-winning music video, regarded as one of the most memorable in country music history, was included in The Entertainer DVD box set.

== Music video ==
The music video was directed by Jon Small, and premiered on CMT on November 19, 1994, as their "Hot Shot Video of the Week". The video opens with an all-white room. As the song starts, Brooks is shown rising out of the floor from a red puddle like its water in an all-white suit and barefoot sitting at a white piano. As the music builds up, the different colors of paint represented, such as red, blue, and green, are splashed across him, and the piano. During the guitar solo, another Brooks is standing over the first Brooks on the piano wearing a black and red outfit. At the end of the song, Brooks goes back to an all-white scene, singing "Steam on a window, salt in a kiss/Two hearts have never pounded like this", with the fade out done as red paint (the only shot digitally inserted) runs down the screen.

The overhead shots and the shots of blue on the hands and green on the feet were done by David Gant, the piano and fiddle player for Brooks's tour band. The piano rising from the puddle was not done with digital enhancement. It's actually the video they shot (piano going down into the paint) playing in reverse. Vince Montefusco, mechanical & explosives special effects expert, designed and built the hydraulic rig. He was also involved with some of the directing of this dangerous stunt. Brooks did all the opening motions backwards and Vince lowered him into the pit. There was a safety medical team standing by in case the hydraulic rig failed to lift him out of the pit.

Montefusco was also responsible for the mud-based red paint used in the video. According to Brooks on his "Video Collection Volume II" VHS, it took two days to shoot the opening scene alone due to the paint itself. 35 gallons of red paint were used during the entire shoot, a majority of it for the opening scene alone. When the piano was lowered the first time, they filled up the pit with straight up paint. Due to the thickness of the paint, the lowering mechanism stuck and stopped out. Brooks noted he was grateful it stopped out because he started having hypothermia due to the paint being cold from having been stored outside the previous night. Brooks later commented on the danger posed by the extremely cold paint, saying, “We actually tried it the first day and what happened was the piano got about halfway down into the paint and totally stopped out because we were using all paint at that time, so it was too thick, so the lowering device wouldn't let the piano go down. Also, the worst thing about it was the paint was freezing cold, they had stored it outside the night before, so it was about 40 or 50 degrees. So, when I hit the paint, the whole just was we were going under and holding our breath for 5 seconds and they were lifting the canopy back up where we could breathe. Well, as I started going down, I started hyperventilating because it was so cold, so I thought that was the last anybody was gonna see of me, and I still think it was the hand of God today that stopped that piano from going down and I was really happy it did. So, the next day when we shot it, the paint was warm, it was thinned out, it was just like diving into a pool, and it was a lot better the second day and i'm real thankful it turned out the way it did.”

After thinking over it overnight and pitching the idea to Small, Montefusco and his team returned and thinned out the paint by adding a 35-gallon mixture of mud and water to the paint, not only giving them more fluid to work with but also warming it up in the process. According to Garth "it was like diving into a pool". For the final line of the bridge, the initial blast of red paint from overhead is done by a fire hose and Vince Montefusco's special effects team. If slowed down enough, the scene itself is revealed to be two different shots in one. Right after the initial blast is done by the hose, when slowed frame by frame, Garth getting dumped on by two buckets (off camera) of red paint is not done in the same shot as the fire hose.

"Red Strokes" won the 1994 Music Video of the Year Award at the ACMs, which, according to Brooks on his "Video Collection Volume II" VHS, was plaqued up and shipped to David Gant for his work on the video and the extra effort he put into it.

The music video was parodied in The Warren Brothers' music video for "Sell a Lot of Beer".

== Release notes ==
In the United Kingdom, "The Red Strokes" was released as a two-part single. Both parts containing the song as well as other songs from previous albums. Part two was released one week after part 1 and contained an interview with Brooks.

== Track listing ==
7" Jukebox single Liberty S7-18554, 1993

1. "The Red Strokes" – 3:43
2. "Burning Bridges"

UK CD single Capitol PM515, 1993
Part 1

1. "The Red Strokes"
2. "Ain't Goin' Down (Til the Sun Comes Up)"
3. "The Dance"
4. "That Summer"

Part 2

1. "The Red Strokes"
2. "Friend in Low Places"
3. "Every Now and Then"
4. Interview

UK Cassette single Liberty TC-CL 704, 1993
Sides 1 & 2

1. "The Red Strokes"
2. "Ain't Goin' Down (Til the Sun Comes Up)"

Dutch CD single Liberty 7243 8 81127 2 7, 1993

1. "The Red Strokes" – 3:44
2. "Ain't Goin' Down (Til the Sun Comes Up)" – 4:31
3. "The Dance" – 3:41
4. "That Summer" – 4:47

== Chart positions ==
Chart (1994–1995)	Peak position
Australia (ARIA)	145
Canada Country Singles (RPM)	38
Europe (Eurochart Hot 100)	32
Irish Singles Chart	7
New Zealand Singles Chart	34
UK Singles Chart	13
US Hot Country Songs (Billboard)	49
