= Standing Outside the Fire =

Single by Garth Brooks

from the album In Pieces
- B-side: "Cold Shoulder"
- Released: December 13, 1993
- Recorded: 1993
- Studio: Jack's Tracks (Nashville, Tennessee)
- Genre: Country pop
- Length: 3:52
- Label: Liberty 17802
- Songwriters: Jenny Yates; Garth Brooks
- Producer: Allen Reynolds

Garth Brooks singles chronology
"American Honky-Tonk Bar Association" (1993)	"Standing Outside the Fire" (1993)	"One Night a Day" (1994)

UK cover

Spain cover

"Standing Outside the Fire" is a song co-written and recorded by American country music artist Garth Brooks. The song was written by Brooks, along with Jenny Yates. It was released in December 1993 as the third single from his album In Pieces. The song also appears on The Hits, The Limited Series, Double Live, and The Ultimate Hits. It reached number three on the Billboard Hot Country Songs chart in 1994. It was also a success internationally and reached the top 30 of the UK Singles Chart, a rare feat for a country singer at the time.

== Background and production ==
Brooks provided the following background information on the song in the CD booklet liner notes from The Hits:

"I was in Los Angeles in 1992, hanging out with a good friend, Jenny Yates. In a conversation I was describing something that I thought was really close, but for me it just stood outside the fire. There was that brilliant moment of silence when we just looked at each other and smiled, Within an hour and half, this song was written. This is another song of inspiration, and Jenny is that way when it comes to inspiration. I don't know if I have ever met a bigger dreamer than Jenny – to the one who saw the vision and made it happen – may hats off to Jenny Yates".

Mark Casstevens played acoustic guitar, Chris Leuzinger played electric guitar, Milton Sledge played drums, Mike Chapman played bass guitar, Rob Hajacos played fiddle, Bobby Wood played piano, Sam Bacco and Ferrell Morris provided percussion, Sam Bush played mandolin, and Trisha Yearwood provided harmony vocals.

== Lawsuit ==
In 1991, Kenny Loggins and his guitarist Guy Thomas wrote the song "Conviction of the Heart" for his album Leap of Faith. Two years later, when Brooks released "Standing Outside the Fire", Loggins and Thomas thought the song sounded similar to their composition. Loggins discusses this in his 2022 autobiography. Loggins said that he contacted Brooks via telephone to discuss the issue. Loggins claims that Brooks admitted that he'd borrowed from his song, and so Loggins suggested that he and Thomas should receive a percentage of the sales. "Garth didn't like that idea at all", Loggins writes in the book. "His tone grew steely and defensive".

Loggins and Thomas sued Brooks for $5 million. Before the court proceeding began, the judge called Thomas and Brooks into his chambers. That conversation was off the record, but when finished Brooks agreed to settle the lawsuit. Loggins writes of the 1998 court appearance that the agreement meant that the amount of money involved couldn't be shared and Brooks had to admit to settling the suit. Loggins writes: "Afterward, he said publicly something like, 'Sometimes. you just have to pay to get people off your back'", Loggins continues, "I let that one go. I haven't seen him since".

== Music video ==
Brooks claims, on his All Access DVD, that most letters he receives regarding "Standing Outside the Fire" are from participants (or relatives of) in Special Olympics. In the emotional and inspirational music video, a high school student with Down syndrome named Brandon decides to not participate in the institution's Special Olympics but signs up for the regular event. There is much strife between Brandon's parents, concerning whether or not he should be allowed to do this. The father is strongly opposed, claiming that "he will embarrass himself". However, the mother believes the father disapproves because he himself will be embarrassed. Brandon is seen working very hard for the meet. On the day of the State Track and Field Meet, Brandon trips during a race and is injured. The coach tries to help him out, but his father runs on the track and encourages his son to finish the race regardless, rather than quit. The father says to the coach, "Get away from him! He is not finished!" After his father's encouragement, Brandon picks himself up and sprints across the finish line, where he is emotionally embraced by both of his parents.

Brooks is not seen until two minutes into the video, where he is playing and singing with his band in front of a set resembling the sign-up board, which is on fire. After that, Brooks is also seen among the crowd of the sports day event. He said at the time that the reason for this is that he wanted the focus of the video to be on the storyline, versus him playing the song. Contrary to popular belief, the drum kit Garth's drummer Mike Palmer was playing was placed directly outside the fire and melted during the shoot. The video was directed by Jon Small, and was filmed over three days in suburbs of Los Angeles, California. The school scenes (including the track meet) were filmed at John Marshall High School, the same school where Van Halen's "Hot for Teacher" video and the final carnival scene from Grease were filmed, while the residential scenes were filmed in Westwood.

== Track listing ==
UK CD single Capitol CDCL 712 – 1994

1. "Standing Outside the Fire"
2. "Unanswered Prayers"
3. "In Lonesome Dove"
4. "Ain't Goin' Down ('Til the Sun Comes Up)"

UK 2-disc CD single Capitol CDCLS 712 – 1994

Disc one

1. "Standing Outside the Fire"
2. "The Night Will Only Know"
3. "Dixie Chicken"

Disc two

1. "Standing Outside the Fire"
2. "Unanswered Prayers"
3. "In Lonesome Dove"
4. "Ain't Going Down ('Til the Sun Comes Up)"

Netherlands CD single Capitol 72438136129 – 1994

1. "Standing Outside the Fire"
2. "The Night Will Only Know"
3. "Dixie Chicken"
4. "In Lonesome Dove"

Australian CD single Capitol – 1993

1. "Standing Outside the Fire"
2. "Friends in Low Places"
3. "Every Now and Then"
4. "Interview"

UK 7" vinyl single Capitol CL 712 – 1993

1. "Standing Outside the Fire"
2. "The Night Will Only Know"

== Chart positions ==
Chart (1993–1994)	Peak position
Australian Singles Chart	45
Canada Country Singles (RPM)	3
Europe (Eurochart Hot 100)	57
Irish Singles Chart	12
Scottish Singles Chart	27
UK Singles Chart	28
US Hot Country Songs (Billboard)	3

=== Year-end charts ===
Chart (1994)	Position
Canada Country Tracks (RPM)	31
US Country Songs (Billboard)	63
