= In Pieces (Garth Brooks album) =

1993 studio album of country music by Garth Brooks

Studio album by Garth Brooks
- Released: August 31, 1993
- Recorded: Jack's Tracks (Nashville, Tennessee)
- Genre: Country
- Length: 37:47
- Label: Liberty
- Producer: Allen Reynolds

Garth Brooks chronology
The Chase (1992)	In Pieces (1993)	The Garth Brooks Collection (1994)

Singles from In Pieces
- 1. "Ain't Going Down ('Til the Sun Comes Up)" Released: July 26, 1993; 2. "American Honky-Tonk Bar Association" Released: September 7, 1993; 3. "Standing Outside the Fire" Released: December 13, 1993; 4. "One Night a Day" Released: May 2, 1994; 5. "Callin' Baton Rouge" Released: August 1, 1994; 6. "The Red Strokes" Released: November 15, 1994

Professional ratings
Review scores
Source	Rating
AllMusic	4/5 stars
Christgau's Consumer Guide	A−
Entertainment Weekly	C+
NME	6/10
Rolling Stone	3/5 stars

In Pieces is the fifth studio album by American country music artist Garth Brooks. It was released on August 31, 1993, by Liberty Records. It debuted at #1 on the Billboard 200 and the Top Country Albums chart.

The album was likewise a hit outside the United States. In the United Kingdom, it was Brooks' highest-placed album on the charts. It reached the top ten of the UK country album charts before it was issued officially (due to imports from both the United States and Ireland). Critics felt that this would ruin the album's sales once it was issued. However, when it was eventually issued in Britain in early 1994 it went to #1 on the country charts and reached #2 in the pop charts, and also produced two top-forty hit singles on the British pop charts.

The track "Callin' Baton Rouge" was previously a #37 peaking single in 1987 for the New Grass Revival, whose members back Brooks on his rendition. It was the first time the group had recorded together since they disbanded in 1989.

In an interview with BBC Radio DJ Richard Wooton, Brooks stated that the track "The Cowboy Song" (which was written in 1987 by Roy Robinson) was found in a trash can by someone on his team who liked the song and played the track to him.

== Background ==
Brooks commented on the album saying:

In Pieces was just time to smile. It was time to laugh, it was time to get loud. It's definitely the most live album that we've ever cut. I think the band went to a different level on this. They seemed to play more like a band that had been together for years than studio musicians that come together and play at time to time. So this one is all there for me. I like to listen to it loud, and I just love the stuff like "Baton Rouge" and "Ain't Going Down Til The Sun Comes Up". From "One Night A Day", all the way to the very last song, "The Cowboy Song", which is definitely my favorite off In Pieces and it will stand up with anything that I have cut over the past five years. Like the other things, I'm very proud of this one and I hope you like it.

== Track listing ==
The track ordering has varied on different releases of this album.

=== Original release ===
No.	Title	Writer(s)	Length
1.	"Standing Outside the Fire"	Garth Brooks; Jenny Yates	3:53
2.	"The Night I Called the Old Man Out"	Brooks; Pat Alger; Kim Williams	3:12
3.	"American Honky-Tonk Bar Association"	Bryan Kennedy; Jim Rushing	3:33
4.	"One Night a Day"	Gary Burr; Pete Wasner	4:16
5.	"Kickin' and Screamin'"	Tony Arata	4:02
6.	"Ain't Goin' Down ('Til the Sun Comes Up)"	Brooks; Williams; Kent Blazy	4:34
7.	"The Red Strokes"	Brooks; Yates; James Garver; Lisa Sanderson	3:44
8.	"Callin' Baton Rouge"	Dennis Linde	2:38
9.	"The Night Will Only Know"	Brooks; Yates; Stephanie Davis	3:56
10.	"The Cowboy Song"	Roy Robinson	3:59
Total length:			37:47

=== Limited series ===
1. "Standing Outside the Fire"
2. "The Night I Called the Old Man Out"
3. "American Honky-Tonk Bar Association"
4. "One Night a Day"
5. "Kickin' and Screamin'"
6. "Anonymous" (Tony Arata, Jon Schwabe) – 2:55
7. "Ain't Going Down ('Til the Sun Comes Up)"
8. "The Red Strokes"
9. "Callin' Baton Rouge"
10. "The Night Will Only Know"
11. "The Cowboy Song"

=== The Remastered series ===
1. "Standing Outside the Fire"
2. "The Night I Called the Old Man Out"
3. "American Honky-Tonk Bar Association"
4. "One Night a Day"
5. "Ain't Going Down ('Til the Sun Comes Up)"
6. "Anonymous"
7. "Kickin' and Screamin'"
8. "The Red Strokes"
9. "Callin' Baton Rouge"
10. "The Night Will Only Know"
11. "The Cowboy Song"

== Personnel ==
- Sam Bacco – percussion on "Standing Outside The Fire"
- Bruce Bouton – pedal steel guitar on "The Night I Called The Old Man Out" and "American Honky-Tonk Bar Association"; resonator guitar on "The Cowboy Song"
- Garth Brooks – vocals, acoustic guitar
- Sam Bush – mandolin on "Standing Outside The Fire", "Callin' Baton Rouge" and "The Cowboy Song"; fiddle and backing vocals on "Callin' Baton Rouge"
- Mark Casstevens – acoustic guitar
- Mike Chapman – bass guitar
- Kathy Chiavola – backing vocals
- John Cowan – backing vocals on "Callin' Baton Rouge"
- Helen Darling – harmony and backing vocals
- Jerry Douglas – resonator guitar on "The Red Strokes", "Callin' Baton Rouge" and "The Cowboy Song"
- Bobby Emmons – Hammond organ on "One Night a Day"
- Ty England – acoustic guitar, harmony and backing vocals on "Anonymous"
- Béla Fleck – banjo on "Callin' Baton Rouge"
- Pat Flynn – acoustic guitar on "Callin' Baton Rouge"
- Rob Hajacos – fiddle on "Standing Outside The Fire", "The Night I Called The Old Man Out", "American Honky-Tonk Bar Association", "Ain't Going Down (Til The Sun Comes Up)" and "The Cowboy Song"
- Jim Horn – saxophone on "One Night a Day"
- Roy Huskey Jr. – double bass on "The Cowboy Song"
- Chris Leuzinger – acoustic and electric guitars
- Steve McClure – electric and pedal steel guitars on "Anonymous"
- Terry McMillan – harmonica on "Ain't Goin' Down Til the Sun Comes Up"
- Farrell Morris – percussion on "Standing Outside The Fire"
- Mike Palmer – drums and percussion on "Anonymous"
- Milton Sledge – drums; percussion on "Standing Outside The Fire" and "The Night I Called The Old Man Out"
- Bobby Wood – keyboards
- Trisha Yearwood – harmony and backing vocals

== Charts ==
In Pieces debuted at #1 on the U.S. Billboard 200, becoming his third, and #1 on the Top Country Albums, becoming his fourth #1 Country album. In August 2020, In Pieces was certified Diamond by the RIAA.

=== Weekly charts ===
Chart (1993–1994)	Peak position
Australian Albums (ARIA)	1
Canadian Albums (RPM)	3
Canadian Country Albums (RPM)	1
Dutch Albums (Album Top 100)	91
European Albums Chart	11
German Albums (Offizielle Top 100)	83
Irish Albums (IRMA)	1
New Zealand Albums (RMNZ)	3
Norwegian Albums (VG-lista)	18
UK Albums (Official Charts)	2
US Billboard 200	1
US Top Country Albums (Billboard)	1

=== Singles ===
Year	Single	Peak chart positions		
Year	Single	US Country	CAN Country	UK
1993	"Ain't Going Down ('Til the Sun Comes Up)"	1	1	13
1993	"American Honky-Tonk Bar Association"	1	2	—
1993	"Standing Outside the Fire"	3	3	28
1994	"One Night a Day"	7	14	—
1994	"Callin' Baton Rouge"	2	1	—
1994	"The Red Strokes"	49	38	13

=== Year-end charts ===
Chart (1993)	Position
US Billboard 200	17
US Top Country Albums (Billboard)	4
Chart (1994)	Position
Australian Albums (ARIA)	15
US Billboard 200	29
US Top Country Albums (Billboard)	3
Chart (1995)	Position
US Top Country Albums (Billboard)	48

=== Decade-end charts ===
Chart (1990–1999)	Position
US Billboard 200	85

== Certifications and sales ==
Region	Certification	Certified units/sales
Australia (ARIA)	2× Platinum	140,000^{^}
Brazil (Pro-Música Brasil)	Gold	100,000^{*}
Canada (Music Canada)	5× Platinum	500,000^{^}
New Zealand (RMNZ)	Gold	7,500^{^}
Ireland (IRMA)	3× Platinum	45,000^{^}
Japan	—	10,000
Spain	—	20,000
United Kingdom (BPI)	Gold	100,000^{^}
United States (RIAA)	Diamond	10,000,000^{‡}
^{*} Sales figures based on certification alone.^{^} Shipments figures based on certification alone.^{‡} Sales+streaming figures based on certification alone.
