= Callin' Baton Rouge =

Country music song written by Dennis Linde

"Callin' Baton Rouge" is a country music song written by Dennis Linde. The song has been recorded by multiple artists since its composition. It was notably recorded by American country singer and songwriter Garth Brooks whose version was a #2 single in October 1994, behind Brooks & Dunn's "She's Not the Cheatin' Kind".

== Content and recorded versions ==
"Callin' Baton Rouge" is an up-tempo song with a bluegrass sound. In it, the male narrator, presumably a truck driver, is attempting to make contact with a female ("such a strange combination of a woman and a child") named Samantha, whom he met the night before in Baton Rouge, Louisiana.

It was originally recorded by The Oak Ridge Boys on their 1978 album Room Service. It was then recorded by Billie Jo Spears for her 1980 album Standing Tall.

== New Grass Revival version ==
New Grass Revival recorded the song on their 1989 album Friday Night in America, produced by Garth Fundis and Wendy Waldman for Capitol Records. It was the first of two singles from that album. In addition, it was the band's only Top 40 hit on the Billboard country singles charts, where it peaked at number 37. "Let Me Be Your Man" was the b-side.

Chart (1989)	Peak position
Canada Country Singles (RPM)	33
US Hot Country Songs (Billboard)	37

=== Personnel ===
- Sam Bush - fiddle, backing vocals
- Eddie Bayers - drums
- John Cowan - lead vocals, bass guitar
- Béla Fleck - banjo
- Pat Flynn - acoustic guitar, backing vocals

== Garth Brooks version ==
"Callin' Baton Rouge"

Single by Garth Brooks

from the album In Pieces
- B-side: "Same Old Story"
- Released: August 1, 1994
- Studio: Jack's Tracks (Nashville, Tennessee)
- Genre: Country rock; bluegrass
- Length: 2:38
- Label: Liberty 18136
- Songwriter: Dennis Linde
- Producer: Allen Reynolds

Garth Brooks singles chronology
"Hard Luck Woman" (1994)	"Callin' Baton Rouge" (1994)	"The Red Strokes" (1994)

Garth Brooks recorded the song on his 1993 album In Pieces. The song was recorded at Jack's Track's Recording Studio in Nashville, Tennessee, produced by Allen Reynolds, and backing Brooks were acoustic guitarists Mark Casstevens and Pat Flynn, electric guitarist Chris Leuzinger, keyboardist Bobby Wood, resonator guitarist Jerry Douglas, drummer Milton Sledge, mandolinist/fiddler/backing vocalist Sam Bush, bass guitarist Mike Chapman, banjo player Béla Fleck and backing vocalist John Cowan.

=== Background and recording ===
Brooks provided the following background information on the song in the CD booklet liner notes from The Hits:

"I have always been a fan of "Baton Rouge." I was, still am, and always will be a fan of the members of New Grass Revival, four guys well ahead of their time (even if they came out thirty years from now). "Baton Rouge" was a single for them about the time my first album was released. This song did not even break the top thirty, and I believe it did not get a fair shot. When we recorded it, it seemed only natural to bring in the guys from New Grass Revival – Pat Flynn, Bela Fleck, John Cowan, and Sam Bush, teamed with Jerry Douglas. This was the first time the New Grass Revival had been together since their breakup over a year prior to the recording of this song. It was a very good day and an extremely proud moment, and I think this is reflected in the cut itself."

=== Chart performance ===
Brooks's version, the album's fifth single, peaked at number two on the U.S. country singles charts, and number one on the RPM country charts in Canada.

Chart (1994)	Peak position
Canada Country Singles (RPM)	1
US Hot Country Songs (Billboard)	2

=== Year-end charts ===
Chart (1994)	Position
Canada Country Tracks (RPM)	50
US Country Songs (Billboard)	58

=== Appearances ===
Brooks's version is the pre-game song for the LSU football team and run out song for the LSU Tigers baseball team. It is also the version that is played at 2am when all of the college bars in Baton Rouge's “Tigerland” are closing down. Brooks’ version is also played during the nightly dances at 4-H University, the Louisiana State 4-H Convention, held at LSU. The song is usually the last to be played nightly at the Pete Maravich Assembly Center after LSU Tigers men's and women's basketball games and gymnastics meets.
