= Jim Garver =

- Born: September 8, 1957 (age 68); Concordia, Kansas, U.S.
- Origin: Concordia, Kansas
- Genres: Country
- Occupation: Musician
- Instruments: Guitars, banjo, fiddle, piano, percussion, vocals
- Years active: 1987 Till 2000

James Garver (born September 8, 1957) is an American country music guitarist. Garver is credited with referencing the bar "The Oasis" (after a closed establishment in his hometown of Concordia, Kansas) in the song Friends in Low Places made famous by Garth Brooks. Garver toured extensively with Brooks and as of 2012, Garver has been credited with 25 different albums with roles ranging from musician to composer.

== Biography ==
Garver grew up in Concordia, Kansas, with his parents, Don and Donna. Garver played in several bands, including the KFDI Ranchhouse Swing Band for about a year, before moving to Nashville, Tennessee. He was working full-time as a bricklayer, and playing in a local band, in 1988 when he attended a writers' showcase one night at the Bluebird Cafe and met Garth Brooks. That same week, after learning that Brooks worked at a boot store, Garver went to the store and the two talked music again. Brooks invited Garver to join his band in May. Shortly afterwards, Garver introduced Brooks to steel guitarist Steve McClure, a fellow Kansan, who also joined Brooks' band, now named Stillwater. Within two months, Brooks signed with Capitol Records. Garver recalled, "I originally started out as a fiddle player for him and he ended up liking my guitar playing better, so that's where I ended up." He added, "I was just happy to have a job." In subsequent years, Garver provided backing vocals and played lead electric guitar, acoustic guitar, banjo, piano, and percussion.

Mr. Garver has not performed as a musician since 2000. He and his wife Lana now own and operate Garver Builders, LLC, a commercial and industrial building contractor and developer, in Gallatin, Tennessee.

== Musical contributions and influence ==
Jim Garver contributes to country music history not only through his work as a touring guitarist with Garth Brooks but also through his indirect influence on songwriting. Garver is credited with inspiring lyrical elements in the song “Friends in Low Places,” as the bar name referenced in the song was drawn from a real establishment in his hometown of Concordia, Kansas, reflecting his personal and regional influence on one of the most iconic country songs of the 1990s.

== Discography ==
- For Garth Brooks:
  - No Fences, guitar, fiddle and vocals, as part of Stillwater
