= Friends in Low Places =

Single by Garth Brooks

from the album No Fences
- B-side: "Nobody Gets Off in This Town"
- Released: August 6, 1990
- Recorded: 1990
- Studio: Jack's Tracks (Nashville, Tennessee)
- Genre: Country
- Length: 4:18 (album version); 3:45 (single edit)
- Label: Capitol Nashville 44647
- Songwriters: Dewayne Blackwell; Earl Bud Lee
- Producer: Allen Reynolds

Garth Brooks singles chronology
"The Dance" (1990)	"Friends in Low Places" (1990)	"Unanswered Prayers" (1990)

Audio sample
- "Friends in Low Places": file; help

"Friends in Low Places" is a song recorded by American country music artist Garth Brooks. It was released on August 6, 1990, as the lead single from his album No Fences. The song spent four weeks at number one on the Hot Country Songs, and won both the Academy of Country Music and Country Music Association awards for 1990 Single of the Year.

"Friends in Low Places" was written in 1989 by songwriters Earl Bud Lee and Dewayne Blackwell and first released by David Wayne Chamberlain in 1989. The two songwriters had given the song to Brooks to record as a demo soon before the release of his self-titled first album, when he was a relatively unknown singer. Enamored with the song, Brooks recorded his version the next year. Mark Chesnutt recorded the song for his second album Too Cold at Home.

== Writing ==
According to Earl Bud Lee, one of the song's co-writers, the idea of the song was born when he and some songwriting friends gathered for lunch one day at Tavern on the Row, a popular Nashville eatery. When the check came, Lee realized he had forgotten his money. He was asked how he was going to pay for the meal, and he replied, "Don't worry. I have friends in low places. I know the cook." Lee and his songwriting partner, Dewayne Blackwell, immediately recognized that the line "friends in low places" had potential, but they did not act upon it immediately.

Some months later, Lee and Blackwell were at a party, celebrating a recent No. 1 hit by another songwriter. They began to talk about the dormant "friends in low places" idea, and "at that very moment, it all started to come together in a song," Lee said. Because nothing else was available, they wrote the song on paper napkins. When the songwriters polished "Friends in Low Places", they contacted Garth Brooks to see if he would record a demo for them.

Guitarist James Garver added "The Oasis", the name of the bar in the song, after an establishment in his hometown of Concordia, Kansas.

== Song structure ==
"Friends in Low Places" is in a moderate tempo and the key of A major. The song begins with arpeggios on the chords A, A_{♯dim}7, B_{m}7, and E_{add}9, a pattern which is repeated throughout the verses. The intro was not originally part of the song, but was improvised by session guitarist Mark Casstevens. The chorus uses A-B_{m}-E twice before ending on an A chord. An electric guitar solo with pedal steel guitar flourishes is played between the first chorus and second verse.

The song spans from a low note of E_{2} to F♯_{4}.

== Brooks's demo ==
Lee and Blackwell had met Brooks when he was a shoe salesman in a Nashville store, looking for his big break. The two struck up a conversation with the struggling musician, and upon learning his background, they gave him some work making demos of their songs. They were impressed with his voice and talent, but there was not much else they could do for him. When Blackwell contacted Brooks to make the "Friends in Low Places" demo, Brooks explained to Blackwell that he was newly signed to Capitol Records, and that his first single and first album were already scheduled.

The demo of "Friends in Low Places" was recorded at Windwalker Studios, in Goodlettsville, Tennessee. Musicians on the demo were John Beland (of The Flying Burrito Brothers) on acoustic and electric guitars, along with session aces Steve Turner on drums, and bassist Larry Paxton. Frank Green was the recording engineer. The actual master recording of "Friends in Low Places" borrowed quite a lot from the original demo, copying Beland's now famous acoustic guitar intro.

After recording the demo (the last he made), Brooks thanked Lee and Blackwell for all of their help. He then expressed his liking for the song, wishing aloud that he had heard it several weeks earlier, when he was recording his new album.

== Shopping the song to other artists ==
Brooks provided the following background information on the song in the CD booklet liner notes from The Hits:

"'Friends in Low Places' was the last demo session I ever did as a singer. The demo was for Bud Lee and Dewayne Blackwell. I sang the session out in Hendersonville, and for the next two weeks the chorus to this song kept running through my head. I knew it would be a year and a half before the release of No Fences because Garth Brooks was just getting ready to be released. I asked Bud Lee and Dewayne if I could hold on to it and, without a blink of an eye, they both said yes. Putting that kind of faith into an unknown artist is unheard of. Thanks Dewayne and Bud for believing in me."

While Brooks claimed in the liner notes that "Friends in Low Places" was held for him, David Chamberlain recorded it first in 1989. Mark Chesnutt also recorded it in 1990. His version appears on his 1990 debut album Too Cold at Home (released only a month after No Fences), and was the B-side to his late-1991 single "Broken Promise Land".

In 2000, songwriter Dewayne Blackwell recorded and released the song on the compilation In the Beginning: A Songwriter's Tribute to Garth Brooks

In 2024, Travis Kelce covered the song on the Kansas City Chiefs championship parade after their Super Bowl win, prompting Brooks to invite Kelce at the opening of his "Friends in Low Places Bar and Honky Tonk" in Nashville.

== Recording ==
After the success of Brooks's eponymous debut album, he contacted the writers of "Friends in Low Places" to ask if the song was still available, and they said it was. In keeping with the raucous theme, a large contingent of backing vocalists accompanied Brooks as the chorus was repeated until a fadeout. Among the members of the group were Brooks's then-wife, Sandy, and both songwriters, Blackwell and Lee. At one point near the end of the song, one of the musicians opens a beer can, which is picked up by a microphone. When the album was being mastered, the sound of the beer can was originally mistaken for an audio glitch. Later on, one of the crowd members shouts "Push, Marie!" in reference to Garver, who was in the hospital while his wife was giving birth.

Recognizing the song's potential, producer Allen Reynolds, in consultation with Capitol Nashville president Jimmy Bowen, decided that Brooks's rendition was going to be the first single from his new album, No Fences. In July 1990, Brooks's mother, Colleen Carroll, inadvertently leaked the unreleased song to an Oklahoma radio station, setting off a frenzy and forcing the single and album to be rush-released.

A live album recording was made in Wichita, Kansas, on the final night of five shows, on November 16, 1997. Ticket demand was so high the Sunday night show was added and a 'Low Places' live version with the third verse was recorded and went on the double disc live album.

== Critical reception ==
"Friends in Low Places" entered the Hot Country Songs on August 18, 1990. It took eight weeks to reach No. 1, where it remained there for four weeks until it was succeeded by "You Lie" by Reba McEntire.

The song was an immediate success within the country music fandom, and along with Brooks' previous hit The Dance, helped made him a Country Superstar. Brooks told a reporter from USA Today in October 1990, when the song was still at its chart peak, that he had received letters from high school students saying that they wanted to use "Friends in Low Places" as their "class song," only to have it opposed by their principals because the song is about escaping into drinking. Brooks agreed with the principals, saying, "We've had a lot of fun with that song, but it's nothing to base your values on."

In April 1991, Brooks's recording won the 1990 Academy of Country Music award for Single of the Year, and on October 2, 1991, it won the same honor from the Country Music Association.

It made the top 40 on the UK Singles Chart in 1995 as a double-sided reissue hit with "The Dance". The song also appeared on Brooks's 1994 compilation The Hits. In 2003, the song was listed No. 6 on CMT 100 Greatest Songs of Country Music broadcast. and the No. 1 spot on the network's 40 Greatest Drinking Songs: Morning After.

Starting in 2008, "Friends in Low Places" became the traditional sing-along song during the sixth inning at Kansas City Royals home games at Kauffman Stadium. Garth Brooks has recorded dozens of different introductions to be played on the Jumbotron display before the start of the song. The tradition ended in 2014 when Don't Stop Believin' by Journey was chosen as the new sixth inning song, even though the lyrics mention a "city boy raised in south Detroit", home to the Royals' American League Central division rival Detroit Tigers, and Journey hails from San Francisco, whose Giants defeated the Royals in the 2014 World Series.

In a 2009 essay on Brooks, Chuck Klosterman reflected on the song's success. Brooks, he argued, had filled a void in popular culture left by Bruce Springsteen during the 1990s:

...[H]e made songs that satisfied all the same needs as Bruce's did, except with a little less sincerity and a little better understanding of who his audience was. "Friends in Low Places" was as effective as pop music ever gets: It's a depressing song that makes you feel better. Singing along with that song was like drunkenly laughing at a rich person and knowing that you were right ... It's a song that makes me want to get drunk out of spite. Garth told stories about blue-collar people who felt good about what their bad life symbolized ...

In 2024, Rolling Stone ranked the song at #35 on its 200 Greatest Country Songs of All Time ranking.

== The "third verse" ==
The original version of "Friends in Low Places" has two verses. In 1991, Brooks added a "third verse" to the song in live performances. His spiel leading to the new verse claimed that he thought the song's original verse did not reflect how he would really act in that situation. Its lyrics are heavily based on the second verse, with only the last few lines changed, culminating in "Just wait 'til I finish this glass / Then sweet little lady, I'll head back to the bar / And you can kiss my ass".

== 25th anniversary version ==
In September 2015, it was announced a new version of "Friends in Low Places" would be released on Brooks's 25th anniversary No Fences album. The song featured George Strait, Jason Aldean, Florida Georgia Line, and Keith Urban singing along with Brooks. The 25th anniversary edition of the album was scrapped over royalty disputes, but the song appeared on Brooks' 2016 The Ultimate Collection box set.

== Track listing ==
US promotional 7" single Capitol Nashville, 1990

1. "Friends in Low Places" (Edit) 3:45 7PRO-79216
2. "Friends in Low Places" (LP Version) 4:18 7PRO-79239

US promotional CD single Capitol Nashville DPRO-79217, 1990

1. "Friends in Low Places" (Edit) 3:45
2. "Friends in Low Places" (LP Version) 4:18

US 7" single Capitol Nashville NR-44647, 1990

1. "Friends in Low Places" (Edited) 3:45
2. "Nobody Gets Off in This Town" 2:17

US 7" single (live) Liberty S7-57883, 1992

1. "Friends in Low Places" (Live Version) 7:00
2. "Thunder Rolls" (Live Version) 4:45

US promotional CD single (live) Liberty DPRO-79365, 1992

1. "Friends in Low Places" (Live Version) 7:00
2. "Thunder Rolls" (Live Version) 4:45

UK 7" single Capitol CL 609, 1991

1. "Friends in Low Places"
2. "Not Counting You"

UK CD single Capitol CDCL 609, 1991

1. "Friends in Low Places"
2. "Not Counting You"
3. "Much Too Young (To Feel This Damn Old)"

The Netherlands CD single Capitol, 1995

1. "Friends in Low Places"
2. "The Dance"
3. "The River" (Live acoustic version)

== Chart positions ==
"Friends in Low Places" entered the charts on August 18, 1990. It reached number one on October 6 and remained there for four consecutive weeks until it was knocked off by "You Lie" by Reba McEntire.

=== Weekly charts ===
Chart (1990–1995)	Peak position
Canada Country Singles (RPM)	1
Europe (Eurochart Hot 100)	89
Irish Singles Chart	3
Scottish Singles Chart	31
UK Singles Chart	36
US Hot Country Songs (Billboard)	1

=== Year-end charts ===
Chart (1990)	Position
Canada Country Tracks (RPM)	4
US Country Songs (Billboard)	28
