= Garth Brooks discography =

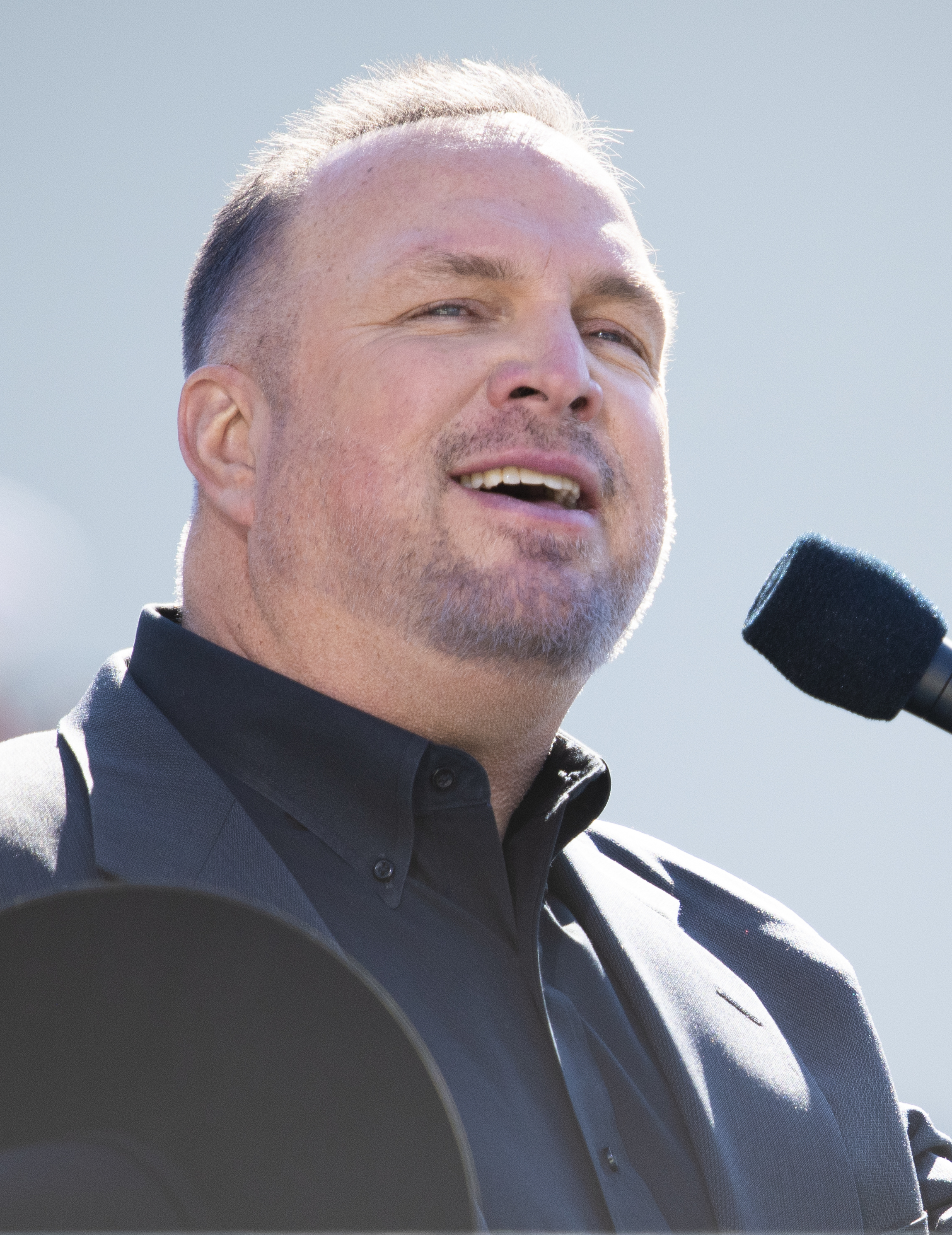
- Brooks performing at the Inauguration of Joe Biden in January 2021
- Studio albums: 16
- Live albums: 2
- Compilation albums: 4
- Singles: 63
- Music videos: 27
- Boxed sets: 13
- Other charted songs: 31

American country music singer-songwriter Garth Brooks has released 16 studio albums, two live albums and 63 singles. He has sold estimated over 170 million records worldwide, making him one of the best-selling music artists in history. According to RIAA, Brooks is the top-selling solo artist of all time with 157 million certified albums in the US. American Music Awards honored him the "Artist of the 90s Decade" and iHeartRadio Music Awards also honored him the "Artist of the Decade".

Brooks has scored 9 No. 1 albums on Billboard 200 and achieved 19 No. 1 hits on Hot Country Songs. Nine of his albums have achieved Diamond status in the United States, the most for any artist ever. Billboard lists Brooks as the 20th Greatest Artist of all time while Recording Industry Association of America list him as the 2nd-best-selling artist in history.

Most of his compact discs were remastered/reissued in 2000 and again in 2007 and 2014 via GhostTunes, Brooks' online music store, on March 3, 2017, GhostTunes was absorbed into Amazon Music.

== Studio albums ==
Title	Album details	Peak chart positions									Certifications
Title	Album details	US Country	US	CAN Country	CAN	AUS	GER	NOR	NZ	UK	Certifications
Garth Brooks	Release date: April 12, 1989; Label: Capitol Nashville; Formats: CD, LP, cassette, download	2	13	22	60	197	—	—	—	—	RIAA: Diamond
No Fences	Release date: August 27, 1990; Label: Capitol Nashville; Formats: CD, LP, cassette, download	1	3	2	49	11	—	—	—	—	RIAA: 18× Platinum; ARIA: Platinum; MC: 7× Platinum
Ropin' the Wind	Release date: September 2, 1991; Label: Capitol Nashville; Formats: CD, LP, cassette, download	1	1	1	22	21	—	14	33	41	RIAA: 14× Platinum; ARIA: Platinum; MC: 5× Platinum
Beyond the Season (Note: Beyond the Season is a holiday album)	Release date: August 25, 1992; Label: Liberty; Formats: CD, cassette	2	2	3	20	128	—	—	—	—	RIAA: 4× Platinum; MC: 2× Platinum
The Chase	Release date: September 14, 1992; Label: Liberty; Formats: CD, LP, cassette, download	1	1	1	6	24	76	—	45	—	RIAA: Diamond; ARIA: Gold; MC: 5× Platinum
In Pieces	Release date: August 31, 1993; Label: Liberty; Formats: CD, LP, cassette, download	1	1	1	3	1	83	18	3	2	RIAA: Diamond; ARIA: 2× Platinum; BPI: Gold; MC: 5× Platinum; RMNZ: Gold
Fresh Horses	Release date: November 21, 1995; Label: Capitol Nashville; Formats: CD, LP, cassette, download	1	2	1	7	5	55	10	—	22	RIAA: 8× Platinum; ARIA: Gold; BPI: Gold; MC: 5× Platinum
Sevens	Release date: November 25, 1997; Label: Capitol Nashville; Formats: CD, cassette, download	1	1	1	3	20	41	8	—	34	RIAA: Diamond; BPI: Silver; ARIA: Platinum; MC: 5× Platinum
Garth Brooks in... the Life of Chris Gaines	Release date: September 28, 1999; Label: Capitol; Formats: CD, cassette	—	2	5	—	122	—	13	—	—	RIAA: 2× Platinum; MC: Platinum
Garth Brooks & the Magic of Christmas (Note: Garth Brooks & the Magic of Christmas is a holiday album)	Release date: November 23, 1999; Label: Capitol Nashville; Formats: CD, cassette	1	7	1	—	—	—	—	—	—	RIAA: Platinum; MC: Gold
Scarecrow	Release date: November 13, 2001; Label: Capitol Nashville; Formats: CD, cassette, download	1	1	4	4	71	58	32	—	82	RIAA: 5× Platinum; MC: Platinum
Man Against Machine	Release date: November 11, 2014; Label: Pearl, RCA Nashville; Formats: CD, download	1	4	—	4	11	74	—	—	23	RIAA: 2× Platinum; MC: Gold
Christmas Together (Note: Christmas Together is a holiday album) (with Trisha Yearwood)	Release date: November 11, 2016; Label: Pearl, Gwendolyn; Formats: CD, download	1	7	—	7	110	—	—	—	—	
Gunslinger	Release date: November 25, 2016; Label: Pearl; Formats: CD, download	4	25	—	18	16	—	—	—	81	RIAA: 2× Platinum
Fun	Release date: November 20, 2020; Label: Pearl; Formats: CD, download	7	42	—	—	—	—	—	—	—	RIAA: 2× Platinum
Time Traveler	Release date: November 7, 2023; Label: Pearl; Formats: CD	—	—	—	—	—	—	—	—	—	RIAA: Platinum
"—" denotes releases that did not chart

== Compilation albums ==
Title	Album details	Peak chart positions									Sales	Certifications
Title	Album details	US Country	US	CAN Country	CAN	AUS	GER	NOR	NZ	UK	Sales	Certifications
The Garth Brooks Collection	Release date: September 2, 1994; Label: Liberty; Formats: CD, cassette	—	—	—	—	—	—	—	—	—		RIAA: 3× Platinum
The Hits	Release date: December 13, 1994; Label: Liberty; Formats: CD, cassette	1	1	1	5	2	19	3	15	11	US: 10,000,000	RIAA: Diamond; ARIA: Platinum; BPI: Gold; MC: Diamond
Songs from Call Me Claus	Release date: September 25, 2001; Label: Capitol Nashville; Formats: CD	8	99	—	—	—	—	—	—	—		
The Lost Sessions	Release date: November 25, 2005; Label: Pearl; Formats: CD	—	—	—	—	—	—	—	—	—		RIAA: 3× Platinum
The Ultimate Hits	Release date: November 6, 2007; Label: Pearl; Formats: CD	1	3	1	1	11	—	1	—	10	US: 3,135,300	RIAA: Diamond; ARIA: Platinum; IFPI NOR: 2× Platinum
777 Jackpot Box Set	Release date: June 28, 2024; Label: Pearl; Formats: CD	—	—	—	—	—	—	—	—	—		RIAA: 7× Platinum
"—" denotes releases that did not chart

== Live albums ==
Title	Album details	Peak chart positions							Certifications
Title	Album details	US Country	US	CAN Country	CAN	AUS	NOR	UK	Certifications
Double Live	Release date: November 17, 1998; Label: Capitol Nashville; Formats: CD, cassette	1	1	1	1	43	15	57	RIAA: 25× Platinum; ARIA: Gold; BPI: Silver; IFPI NOR: Gold; MC: 6× Platinum
Triple Live	Release date: August 27, 2018; Label: Pearl; Formats: CD, download	16	113	—	—	—	—	—	RIAA: 13× Platinum
"—" denotes releases that did not chart

== Boxed sets ==
Title	Album details	Peak chart positions				Sales	Certifications
Title	Album details	US Country	US	CAN Country	CAN	Sales	Certifications
The Limited Series	Release date: May 5, 1998; Label: Capitol Nashville; Formats: CD, cassette	1	1	1	7		MC: 4× Platinum
The Limited Series	Release date: November 25, 2005; Label: Pearl; Formats: CD	—	—	—	—		
Blame It All on My Roots: Five Decades of Influences	Release date: November 28, 2013; Label: Pearl; Formats: CD	1	1	—	20		RIAA: 4× Platinum (Note: The RIAA database has listed album certifications for each individual album included in the collection. Country Classics, Classic Rock, The Melting Pot, and Blue Eyed Soul are all listed with individual Platinum certifications in the database as of June 26, 2014. The final two albums of the set are a reissue of the 2007 The Ultimate Hits compilation album, which is also listed separately with a certification of 7× Platinum as of the same date. Also, Country Classics is mistakenly listed as Country Hits in the database.)
The Ultimate Collection	Release date: November 11, 2016; Label: Pearl; Formats: Target exclusive CD set	1	6	—	—	US: 554,200	RIAA: 9× Platinum (Note: The RIAA database has listed album certifications for each individual album included in the collection. Anthems, Turn It Up, Cowboys, Midnight Fire, Old School, RPMs, and The Covers are all listed with individual Platinum certifications in the database as of February 26, 2019, while The Road, a double album, is listed as 2× Platinum. The final album of the set is a limited edition of the 2016 Gunslinger studio album, which is also listed separately with a certification of Platinum as of the same date.)
Gunslinger / Christmas Together (with Trisha Yearwood)	Release date: November 18, 2016; Label: Pearl, Gwendolyn; Formats: Walmart exclusive CD set	3	21	—	—		
The Anthology Part I: The First Five Years	Release date: November 17, 2017; Label: Pearl; Formats: CD/Book	1	4	—	—	US: 289,300	RIAA: 4× Platinum
The Anthology Part III: Live	Release date: November 20, 2018; Label: Pearl; Formats: CD/Book	40	—	—	—		
Legacy	Release date: November 1, 2019; Label: Pearl; Formats: CD, vinyl, CD/vinyl	18	149	—	—		
The Anthology Part II: The Next Five Years	Release date: November 15, 2022; Label: Pearl; Formats: CD/Book	—	—	—	—		RIAA: 3× Platinum
The Limited Series	Release date: November 7, 2023; Label: Pearl; Formats: Bass Pro Shops exclusive CD set	—	—	—	—		
The Anthology Part IV: Going Home	Release date: December 6, 2024; Label: Pearl; Formats: CD/Book	—	—	—	—		
The Anthology Part V: The Comeback The First Five Years	Release date: April 4, 2025; Label: Pearl; Formats: CD/Book	—	—	—	—		RIAA: 3× Platinum
The Anthology Part VI: The Comeback The Next Five Years	Release date: December 5, 2025; Label: Pearl; Formats: CD/Book	—	—	—	—		RIAA: 3× Platinum
"—" denotes releases that did not chart.

== Singles ==
=== 1980s and 1990s ===
Year	Title	Peak chart positions							Certifications	Album
Year	Title	US Country	US	US AC	CAN Country	CAN AC	AUS	UK	Certifications	Album
1989	"Much Too Young (To Feel This Damn Old)"	8	—	—	9	—	—	—		Garth Brooks
1989	"If Tomorrow Never Comes"	1	—	—	2	—	—	—		Garth Brooks
1990	"Not Counting You"	2	—	—	1	—	—	—		Garth Brooks
1990	"The Dance"	1	—	—	1	—	—	36		Garth Brooks
1990	"Friends in Low Places"	1	—	—	1	—	—	36		No Fences
1990	"Unanswered Prayers"	1	—	—	1	—	—	—		No Fences
1991	"Two of a Kind, Workin' on a Full House"	1	—	—	1	—	—	—		No Fences
1991	"The Thunder Rolls"	1	—	—	1	—	—	—		No Fences
1991	"Rodeo"	3	—	—	1	—	—	—		Ropin' the Wind
1991	"Shameless"	1	—	—	1	23	103	71		Ropin' the Wind
1991	"What She's Doing Now"	1	—	—	1	—	—	—		Ropin' the Wind
1992	"Papa Loved Mama"	3	—	—	2	—	—	—		Ropin' the Wind
1992	"The River"	1	—	—	1	—	—	—		Ropin' the Wind
1992	"We Shall Be Free"	12	—	—	12	—	—	—		The Chase
1992	"Somewhere Other Than the Night"	1	—	—	1	—	—	—		The Chase
1993	"Learning to Live Again"	2	—	—	5	—	—	—		The Chase
1993	"That Summer"	1	—	—	1	—	—	—		The Chase
1993	"Ain't Goin' Down ('Til the Sun Comes Up)"	1	—	—	1	—	—	13 (Note: "The Red Strokes" and "Ain't Going Down (Til the Sun Comes Up)" were released as double A-side in the UK and for this reason, they charted as one release.)		In Pieces
1993	"American Honky-Tonk Bar Association"	1	—	—	2	—	—	—		In Pieces
1993	"Standing Outside the Fire"	3	—	—	3	—	45	28		In Pieces
1994	"One Night a Day"	7	—	—	14	—	35	—		In Pieces
1994	"Callin' Baton Rouge"	2	—	—	1	—	—	—		In Pieces
1994	"The Red Strokes"	49	—	—	38	—	145	13		In Pieces
1995	"She's Every Woman"	1	—	—	1	—	148	55		Fresh Horses
1995	"The Fever"	23	—	—	2	—	—	—		Fresh Horses
1995	"The Beaches of Cheyenne"	1	—	—	1	—	—	—		Fresh Horses
1996	"The Change"	19	—	—	8	—	—	—		Fresh Horses
1996	"It's Midnight Cinderella"	5	—	—	2	—	—	—		Fresh Horses
1996	"That Ol' Wind"	4	—	—	3	—	—	—		Fresh Horses
1997	"Longneck Bottle"	1	—	—	1	—	—	—		Sevens
1998	"She's Gonna Make It"	2	—	—	1	—	—	—		Sevens
1998	"Two Piña Coladas"	1	—	—	1	—	94	—		Sevens
1998	"To Make You Feel My Love"	1	—	8	7	22	94	—		Hope Floats: Music from the Motion Picture
1998	"You Move Me"	3	—	—	1	—	—	—		Sevens
1998	"It's Your Song"	9	62	—	5	—	—	—		Double Live
1999	"Lost in You"	62	5	9	55	1	175	70	RIAA: Gold	The Life of Chris Gaines (as Chris Gaines)
1999	"It Don't Matter to the Sun"	24	— (Note: "It Don't Matter to the Sun" did not enter the Billboard Hot 100, but peaked at number 13 on the Bubbling Under Hot 100 chart.)	—	23	—	—	—		The Life of Chris Gaines (as Chris Gaines)
1999	"Right Now"	—	—	—	—	—	—	—		The Life of Chris Gaines (as Chris Gaines)
"—" denotes releases that did not chart

=== 2000s ===
Year	Title	Peak chart positions					Album
Year	Title	US Country	US	US AC	CAN Country (Note: Chart positions from RPM Country Tracks from 1989 to 2000, Radio & Records from 2005 to 2006, and Canada Country from 2007 to present.)	CAN	Album
2000	"That's the Way I Remember It"	—	—	24	—	—	In the Life of Chris Gaines (as Chris Gaines)
2000	"Do What You Gotta Do"	13	69	—	18	—	Sevens
2000	"When You Come Back to Me Again"	21	— (Note: "When You Come Back to Me Again" did not enter the Billboard Hot 100, but peaked at number five on the Bubbling Under Hot 100 chart.)	29	23	—	Scarecrow
2000	"Wild Horses"	7	50	—	*	—	No Fences
2001	"Wrapped Up in You"	5	46	—	*	—	Scarecrow
2002	"Squeeze Me In" (with Trisha Yearwood)	16	— (Note: "Squeeze Me In" did not enter the Billboard Hot 100, but peaked at number two on the Bubbling Under Hot 100 chart.)	—	*	—	Scarecrow
2002	"Thicker Than Blood"	18	— (Note: "Thicker Than Blood" did not enter the Billboard Hot 100, but peaked at number 14 on the Bubbling Under Hot 100 chart.)	—	*	—	Scarecrow
2003	"Why Ain't I Running"	24	—	—	*	—	Scarecrow
2005	"Good Ride Cowboy"	3	59	—	2	—	The Lost Sessions
2006	"Love Will Always Win" (with Trisha Yearwood)	23	—	—	20	—	The Lost Sessions
2006	"That Girl Is a Cowboy"	34	—	—	35	—	The Lost Sessions
2007	"More Than a Memory"	1	53	—	1	62	The Ultimate Hits
2007	"Workin' for a Livin'" (with Huey Lewis)	19	— (Note: "Workin' for a Livin'" did not enter the Billboard Hot 100, but peaked at number 15 on the Bubbling Under Hot 100 chart.)	—	19	—	The Ultimate Hits
2008	"Midnight Sun"	36	—	—	34	—	The Ultimate Hits
"—" denotes releases that did not chart "*" denotes releases for which no chart existed at the time

=== 2010s and 2020s ===
Year	Title	Peak chart positions				Album
Year	Title	US Country	US Country Airplay	US	CAN Country	Album
2013	"The Call" (with Trisha Yearwood)	—	49	—	—	Non-album single
2014	"People Loving People"	25	19	— (Note: "People Loving People" did not enter the Billboard Hot 100, but peaked at number four on the Bubbling Under Hot 100 chart.)	10	Man Against Machine
2014	"Mom"	49	32	—	36	Man Against Machine
2016	"Baby, Let's Lay Down and Dance"	29	15	—	23	Gunslinger
2017	"Ask Me How I Know"	13	1	71	30	Gunslinger
2018	"All Day Long"	21	11	— (Note: "All Day Long" did not enter the Billboard Hot 100, but peaked at number nine on the Bubbling Under Hot 100 chart.)	22	Fun
2018	"Stronger Than Me"	38	42	—	—	Fun
2019	"Dive Bar" (with Blake Shelton)	17	6	78	42	Fun
2020	"Shallow" (with Trisha Yearwood)	27	21	— (Note: "Shallow" did not enter the Billboard Hot 100, but peaked at number seven on the Bubbling Under Hot 100 chart.)	—	Fun
2021	"That's What Cowboys Do"	33	29	—	—	Fun
2023	"Rodeo Man" (with Ronnie Dunn)	—	25	—	43	Time Traveler
"—" denotes releases that did not chart

== Other singles ==
=== Featured singles ===
Year	Title	Artist	Peak chart positions				Album
Year	Title	Artist	US Country	US	US AC	CAN Country	Album
1991	"Let's Open Up Our Hearts"	Various	—	—	—	—	Non-album single
1991	"Voices That Care"	Various	—	11	6	—	Non-album single
1991	"Like We Never Had a Broken Heart" (Note: "Like We Never Had a Broken Heart" was credited as a duet between Yearwood and Brooks only on the RPM charts; in the United States, it was credited to Yearwood alone.)	Trisha Yearwood	4	—	—	7	Trisha Yearwood
1992	"Whatcha Gonna Do with a Cowboy" (Note: "Whatcha Gonna Do with a Cowboy" was credited as a duet between LeDoux and Brooks only on the RPM charts; in the United States, it was credited to LeDoux alone.)	Chris LeDoux	7	—	—	5	Whatcha Gonna Do with a Cowboy
1997	"In Another's Eyes"	Trisha Yearwood	2	—	—	2	(Songbook) A Collection of Hits
1998	"One Heart at a Time"	Various	69	56	—	—	Non-album single
1998	"Burnin' the Roadhouse Down"	Steve Wariner	26	—	—	14	Burnin' the Roadhouse Down
1998	"Where Your Road Leads"	Trisha Yearwood	18	—	—	18	Where Your Road Leads
2000	"Katie Wants a Fast One"	Steve Wariner	22	— (Note: "Katie Wants a Fast One" did not enter the Billboard Hot 100, but peaked at number nine on the Bubbling Under Hot 100 Singles chart.)	—	10	Faith in You
2001	"Beer Run (B Double E Double Are You In?)"	George Jones	24	— (Note: "Beer Run (B Double E Double Are You In?)" did not enter the Billboard Hot 100, but peaked at number eighteen on the Bubbling Under Hot 100 Singles chart.)	—	—	The Rock: Stone Cold Country 2001
2003	"Night Birds"	Royal Wade Kimes	—	—	—	—	A Dyin' Breed
"—" denotes releases that did not chart

=== Promotional singles ===
Year	Title	Peak chart positions							Album
Year	Title	US Country	US	US AC	US Pop	CAN Country	CAN	CAN AC	Album
1994	"Hard Luck Woman"	67	— (Note: "Hard Luck Woman" did not enter the Billboard Hot 100, but peaked at number 45 on Hot 100 Airplay.)	28	26	58	23	31	Kiss My Ass: Classic Kiss Regrooved
2020	"We Belong to Each Other"	39	—	—	—	—	—	—	Time Traveler

== Other charted songs ==
Year	Title	Peak positions	Album
Year	Title	US Country	Album
1992	"Against the Grain"	66	Ropin' the Wind
1993	"Dixie Chicken"	73	The Chase
1995	"The Old Stuff"	64	Fresh Horses
1995	"Rollin'"	71	Fresh Horses
1997	"Cowboy Cadillac"	52	Sevens
1997	"How You Ever Gonna Know"	59	Sevens
1997	"Take the Keys to My Heart"	57	Sevens
1997	"A Friend to Me"	68	Sevens
1997	"Don't Have to Wonder"	70	Sevens
1998	"Something with a Ring to It"	68	The Limited Series
1998	"Uptown Down-Home Good Ol' Boy"	65	The Limited Series
1998	"Tearin' It Up (And Burnin' It Down)"	63	Double Live
1998	"Wild as the Wind" (with Trisha Yearwood)	65	Double Live

=== Christmas songs ===
Year	Title	Peak positions		Album
Year	Title	US Country	CAN Country	Album
1992	"The Old Man's Back in Town"	48	—	Beyond the Season
1995	"White Christmas"	70	—	Beyond the Season
1997	"Belleau Wood" (Note: "Belleau Wood" also peaked at number 87 on the Canadian RPM Country Tracks chart.)	41	—	Sevens
1998	"Santa Looked a Lot Like Daddy"	56	—	Beyond the Season
1998	"The Old Man's Back in Town" (re-entry)	59	—	Beyond the Season
1999	"Belleau Wood" (re-entry)	65	—	Sevens
1999	"Go Tell It on the Mountain"	72	—	Beyond the Season
1999	"White Christmas" (re-entry)	65	—	Garth Brooks and the Magic of Christmas
1999	"Sleigh Ride"	54	—	Garth Brooks and the Magic of Christmas
1999	"Baby Jesus Is Born"	62	—	Garth Brooks and the Magic of Christmas
1999	"It's the Most Wonderful Time of the Year"	56	—	Garth Brooks and the Magic of Christmas
1999	"There's No Place Like Home for the Holidays"	63	—	Garth Brooks and the Magic of Christmas
2000	"God Rest Ye Merry Gentlemen"	69	—	Garth Brooks and the Magic of Christmas
2002	"Call Me Claus"	55	—	Songs from Call Me Claus
2002	"'Zat You, Santa Claus?"	56	—	Songs from Call Me Claus
2016	"What I'm Thankful For (The Thanksgiving Song)" (with James Taylor)	50	—	Christmas Together
2017	"Ugly Christmas Sweater"	—	36	Christmas Together
"—" denotes releases that did not chart

== Videography ==
=== Video albums ===
Title	Album details	Certifications (sales threshold)
Garth Brooks	Release date: 1991; Label: Capitol Nashville; Formats: VHS, Laserdisc	RIAA: 4× Platinum
This Is Garth Brooks	Release date: 1992; Label: Liberty; Formats: VHS, Laserdisc	RIAA: 5× Platinum
The Garth Brooks Video Collection, Vol. 2	Release date: 1996; Label: Capitol; Formats: VHS	
Live from Central Park	Release date: 1998; Label: Capitol; Formats: VHS	
The Entertainer	Release date: November 1, 2006; Label: Garth Brooks; Formats: DVD	

=== Music videos ===
Year	Title	Director
1989	"If Tomorrow Never Comes"	John Lloyd Miller
1990	"The Dance"	John Lloyd Miller
1991	"The Thunder Rolls"	Bud Schaetzle
1992	"We Shall Be Free"	Garth Brooks/Tim Miller
1994	"Standing Outside the Fire"	Jon Small
1994	"Callin' Baton Rouge"	House Of Troy Productions
1994	"The Red Strokes"	Jon Small
1995	"Ain't Goin' Down ('Til the Sun Comes Up)"	Maurice Linnane
1995	"The River"	Maurice Linnane
1996	"The Change"	Tim Miller/Jon Small
1997	"In Another's Eyes" (with Trisha Yearwood)	Michael Salomon
1997	"In Another's Eyes" (with Trisha Yearwood; live)	Ellen Brown
1997	"I Don't Have to Wonder"	Garth Brooks/Jon Small
1998	"To Make You Feel My Love"	Jon Small
1998	"Where Your Road Leads" (with Trisha Yearwood)	Jon Small
1998	"That Ain't the Way I Heard It" (with Trisha Yearwood)	Matt Coale/Paul Reeves
1998	"Tearin' It Up (And Burnin' It Down)"	Michael Salomon
1999	"It's Your Song"	Michael Salomon
2000	"When You Come Back to Me Again"	Garth Brooks/Gerry Wenner
2001	"Wrapped Up in You"	Jon Small
2002	"Squeeze Me In" (with Trisha Yearwood)	Jon Small
2005	"Good Ride Cowboy"	Jon Small
2007	"More Than a Memory"	Jon Small
2007	"Workin' for a Livin'" (with Huey Lewis)	Jon Small
2008	"Midnight Sun"	Garth Brooks
2013	"The Call" (with Trisha Yearwood)	Jon Small
2019	"Dive Bar" (with Blake Shelton)	Garth Brooks/Robert Deaton

=== Guest appearances ===
Year	Title	Artist	Director
1991	"Let's Open Up Our Hearts"	Various	Dean Lent
1991	"Voices That Care"	Various	David S. Jackson
1992	"I Don't Need Your Rockin' Chair"	George Jones & Friends	Marc Ball
1996	"Five Dollar Fine" (cameo)	Chris LeDoux	Michael Salomon
1998	"One Heart at a Time"	Various	

== See also ==
- Chris Gaines, for a discography of Brooks' fictional rock star persona
