= The Entertainer (video) =

The Entertainer (2006)

Video by Garth Brooks
- Released: November 1, 2006
- Recorded: On-location, 1992–1997
- Genre: Country
- Length: App. 7 hours
- Producer: Allen Reynolds

The Entertainer is a 5-disc Garth Brooks DVD collection of previously aired television specials and music videos. The collection was released on November 1, 2006, and was sold exclusively at Walmart and Sam's Club stores. Most of the footage is from different angles than seen on the original broadcast.

== Contents ==
The collection contains the following previously aired television specials and music videos:

- Disc 1: This Is Garth Brooks (1992)
- Disc 2: This Is Garth Brooks, Too! (1994)
- Disc 3: Live From Dublin (1997)
- Disc 4: Live from Central Park (1997)
- Disc 5: Video Greatest Hits (1989–2005)

Discs 1, 2, 3 and 4 each contain an edited edition of a previously-aired Garth Brooks television special. References to Brooks' ex-wife Sandy Mahl have been edited out of all four specials, as have most of her likenesses, save a rare brief shot on disc 3. Disc 5 contains a collection of Brooks' music videos, spanning from his first major label album release in 1989, to his last new collection in 2005. They each contain the main program content, two bonus songs, and a photo montage.

Disc 1 contains the program This Is Garth Brooks, filmed during Brooks' September 20 and 21, 1991 sold-out concerts at the Reunion Arena in Dallas Texas. This Is Garth Brooks first aired on January 17, 1992, on NBC-TV.

Disc 2 contains the program This Is Garth Brooks, Too!, a follow-up to the previous show. The concert took place on June 12, 1993, at Texas Stadium, which sold out in 92 minutes, selling over 65,000 tickets and breaking the previous sales record held by Paul McCartney. Dallas fans demanded and got more shows: a second show sold 65,000 tickets in 92 minutes, as did a third.

Disc 3 contains the program Live From Dublin, three sold out concerts in Dublin's Croke Park on May 16, 17 and 18, 1997. 150,000 tickets were sold, which broke a record previously set by U2 in 1992. The concert first aired on March 5, 1998, on NBC and was watched by over 15.7 million people.

Disc 4 contains the program Live in Central Park, which was a free concert in New York City's Central Park on August 7, 1997. Many fans started calling the event "Garthstock", which was attended by around 1 million fans, which was the largest concert ever in Central Park.

Disc 5 contains 15 music videos, from 8 of Brooks' 10 studio albums (except Ropin' the Wind and the Chris Gaines release). It includes some of his biggest hits, including The Thunder Rolls, The Dance, and Callin' Baton Rouge.

The first four discs each offer the program in original Dolby Digital 2.0 stereo surround, and DD 5.1 surround. Each also contains a 10–12 minute photo montage, and two additional songs, though one of the discs, the songs are merely deleted from the original full-length programme and placed in special features.

== Track listing ==
=== This Is Garth Brooks ===
1. "Not Counting You"
2. "Rodeo"
3. "Two of a Kind, Workin' on a Full House"
4. "We Bury the Hatchet"
5. "The Thunder Rolls"
6. "The River"
7. "Much Too Young (To Feel This Damn Old)"
8. "Papa Loved Mama"
9. "If Tomorrow Never Comes"
10. "Shameless"
11. "Friends In Low Places"
12. "The Dance"
13. "You May Be Right" (Billy Joel cover)
14. "Keep Your Hands To Yourself" (Georgia Satellites cover) – in Special Features
15. "What She's Doing Now" – In Special Features

=== This Is Garth Brooks, Too! ===
1. "Standing Outside the Fire"
2. "Papa Loved Mama"
3. "That Summer"
4. "American Honky-Tonk Bar Association"
5. "The River"
6. "The Thunder Rolls"
7. "We Shall Be Free"
8. "Kickin' & Screamin'"
9. "One Night a Day"
10. "Shameless"
11. "Friends In Low Places"
12. "The Dance"
13. "Ain't Goin' Down ('Til the Sun Comes Up)"
14. "Two of a Kind, Workin' on a Full House" – in Special Features
15. "Callin' Baton Rouge" – in Special Features

=== Live From Dublin ===
1. "The Old Stuff"
2. "The Beaches of Cheyenne"
3. "Two of a Kind, Workin' on a Full House"
4. "Unanswered Prayers"
5. "Tearin' It Up (and Burnin' It Down)" – Acoustic
6. "Tearin' It Up (and Burnin' It Down)" – Concert
7. "The River"
8. "We Shall Be Free"
9. "Callin' Baton Rouge"
10. Crowd walk
11. "If Tomorrow Never Comes" – Croke
12. "If Tomorrow Never Comes" – Pub
13. "Ireland"
14. "Friends in Low Places"
15. "That Ol' Wind"
16. "The Fever"
17. "Ain't Goin' Down ('til The Sun Comes Up)"
18. "American Pie"
19. "She's Gonna Make It" – in Special Features
20. "Cowboy Cadillac" – in Special Features

=== Live in Central Park ===
1. "Rodeo"
2. "Papa Loved Mama"
3. "The Beaches of Cheyenne"
4. "Two of a Kind, Workin' on a Full House"
5. "The Thunder Rolls (The Long Version)"
6. "The River"
7. "Callin' Baton Rouge"
8. "Shameless"
9. "Ain't Goin' Down ('til The Sun Comes Up)" – with guest Billy Joel
10. "New York State of Mind" – with guest Billy Joel
11. "The Fever"
12. "Friends in Low Places"
13. "The Dance"
14. "American Pie" – with guest Don McLean
15. "Much Too Young (To Feel This Damned Old)"
16. "If Tomorrow Never Comes"
17. "You May Be Right" – with guest Billy Joel
18. "Unanswered Prayers" – in Special Features
19. "We Shall Be Free" – in Special Features

=== Video Greatest Hits ===
1. "Ain't Going Down ('til The Sun Comes Up)" – from In Pieces
2. "The Thunder Rolls" – from No Fences
3. "Callin' Baton Rouge" – from In Pieces
4. "The Red Strokes" – from In Pieces (Garth Brooks album)|In Pieces
5. "I Don't Have to Wonder" – from Sevens
6. "We Shall Be Free" – from The Chase
7. "When You Come Back to Me Again" – from Scarecrow
8. "Tearin' It Up (and Burnin' It Down)" – from Double Live
9. "If Tomorrow Never Comes" – from Garth Brooks
10. "Standing Outside The Fire" – from In Pieces
11. "Anonymous" – from The Limited Series
12. "Good Ride Cowboy" – from The Lost Sessions
13. "The Change" – from Fresh Horses
14. "Wrapped Up In You" – from Scarecrow
15. "The Dance" – from Garth Brooks
