= Garth: Live from Central Park =

1997 concert held by Garth Brooks

- Concert by Garth Brooks
- Promotional poster
- Location: Central Park, New York City, New York, U.S.
- Date: August 7, 1997
- No. of shows: 1
- Attendance: Over 1,000,000

Garth: Live from Central Park was a concert held by American country pop musician Garth Brooks on August 7, 1997 at Central Park in New York City. Dubbed "Garthstock" (paying homage to Woodstock), the concert was free of charge and became the largest concert ever held in the park, with an estimated audience of over 1,000,000. It was filmed and broadcast live on HBO, as well as later included in Brooks' The Entertainer DVD collection, released in 2006.

== Background ==
Brooks publicly announced a free concert in Central Park during his 1996–98 world tour, and the only stop in New York during its entire record-breaking duration. Initial reports of expected attendance from Brooks' promoter was 1 million, while New York City mayor Rudy Giuliani's office estimated a modest 300,000. Speculation about the area's acceptance of country music, as well as any cross-genre special guests, filled the media days prior to the concert. At the concert, it was revealed that Billy Joel and Don McLean were the rumored special guests, joining Brooks separately onstage to perform a selection of their songs.

=== Stage and setup ===
The stage was of unseen proportions for an outdoor concert, consisting of a circular array lighting rig spanning 100 feet (30 m) atop a stage spanning 360 feet (110 m). Situated on the park's North Meadow, the stage allowed more optimal viewing for fans within the fenced barricade. Having never expected a concert of such attendance in the area, many additional police officers and park rangers were prompted to add more patrol to the site. As space was limited, the New York City Department of Parks and Recreation required fans to bring blankets no larger than for a king-size bed, allowing more room for attendees.

=== Records and legacy ===
Months following the concert, reports began showing total concert attendance being 750,000; however the New York City Fire Department's official attendance record shows an estimation of approximately 1,000,000+. Dubbed "Garthstock", the concert garnered comparison to the Woodstock concert festival due to its large, outdoor attendance. It remains the largest concert ever held in the park, surpassing the previous record of approximately 600,000 (held by Paul Simon from his 1991 park concert). Brooks paid tribute to this record by performing the first two verses of 'A Heart in New York' when taking the stage.

== Broadcast and distribution ==
Garth: Live from Central Park was broadcast live on HBO. Directed by Marty Callner and produced by Jon Small with Brooks serving as executive producer, it received 14.6 million viewers, the most of any concert special that year. It later received six Emmy Award nominations, including for Outstanding Variety, Music, or Comedy Special, and Brooks received the Academy of Country Music's Special Achievement Award for the special.

Orion Home Video released the event to VHS in 1998. For The Entertainer video album, Pearl Records released the concert to DVD on November 1, 2006.

Brooks streamed highlights from the event to his TalkShopLive channel on August 4, 2022 for its 25th anniversary.

== Concert synopsis ==
A pre-recorded cover version of "A Heart in New York" opened the show. The concert commenced with a performance of "Rodeo". Brooks' performance featured his band playing with guest singers and instrumentalists including Billy Joel, Jim Horn and Don McLean.

=== Set list ===
The running order and songs performed:

1. "A Heart in New York" – pre-recorded
2. "Rodeo"
3. "Papa Loved Mama"
4. "The Beaches of Cheyenne"
5. "Two of a Kind, Workin' on a Full House"
6. "The Thunder Rolls"
7. "The River"
8. "We Shall Be Free"
9. "Unanswered Prayers"
10. "That Summer"
11. "Callin' Baton Rouge"
12. "Shameless"
13. "Ain't Goin' Down ('Til the Sun Comes Up)" (ft. Billy Joel)
14. "New York State of Mind" (ft. Jim Horn, Joel)
15. "The Fever"
16. "Friends in Low Places"
17. "The Dance"

Encores

16. "American Pie" (ft. Don McLean)
17. "Much Too Young (To Feel This Damn Old)"
18. "If Tomorrow Never Comes"
19. "You May Be Right" (ft. Horn, Joel)

== Personnel ==
- Garth Brooks – lead vocals, acoustic guitar, electric guitar on "Callin' Baton Rouge"
- Stephanie Davis – acoustic guitar, backing vocals
- David Gant – piano, synthesizers
- James Garver – electric guitar, electric banjo on "Callin' Baton Rouge", backing vocals
- Mark Greenwood – bass guitar, backing vocals
- Jim Horn – alto saxophone on "New York State of Mind" and "You May Be Right"
- Billy Joel – co-lead vocals and piano on "Ain't Goin' Down ('Til the Sun Comes Up)", "New York State of Mind" and "You May Be Right"
- Jimmy Mattingly – fiddle, acoustic guitar
- Steve McClure – pedal steel guitar, electric guitar, acoustic guitar on "Callin' Baton Rouge"
- Don McLean – co-lead vocals and acoustic guitar on "American Pie"
- Debbie Nims – acoustic guitar, mandolin, percussion, backing vocals
- Mike Palmer – drums, percussion

== See also ==
- List of largest concerts
