= Limited series =

Limited series may refer to:

- Limited series, individual storylines within an anthology series
- Limited series, a particular run of collectables, usually individually numbered
- Limited series (comics), a comics series with a predetermined number of issues
- Limited-run series, a television show with a predetermined number of episodes telling a complete story arc, usually longer than a miniseries
- The Limited Series (1998 album), a box set by Garth Brooks
- The Limited Series (2005 album), an unrelated box set by Garth Brooks
