= It's Your Song =

Single by Garth Brooks

from the album Double Live
- Released: November 16, 1998
- Genre: Country
- Length: 4:18 (Double Live version)
- Label: Capitol Nashville
- Songwriters: Pam Wolfe, Benita Hill
- Producer: Allen Reynolds

Garth Brooks singles chronology
"You Move Me" (1998)	"It's Your Song" (1998)	"Lost in You" (1999)

"It's Your Song" is a song written by Pam Wolfe and Benita Hill, and recorded by American country music artist Garth Brooks. It was released in November 1998 as the only single from his live album Double Live, reaching a peak of number 9 on the U.S. Billboard country singles charts and number 5 on the Canadian RPM country charts that year, as well as peaking at number 62 on the U.S. Billboard Hot 100. Both the live recording from Double Live and an alternate studio recording were shipped to radio.

== Content ==
Written by Benita Hill and Pam Wolfe, "It's Your Song" is a mid-tempo ballad which Brooks dedicated to his mother. In it, he expresses the motivation that she had on him and his career.

According to Brooks, Hill pitched him the song after hearing that Brooks' mother was suffering from throat cancer. Hill had initially written the song about her own mother.

=== Version history ===
The live version — the one most commonly heard on radio — and the alternate studio version have a couple of differences.

The most noticeable difference can be heard toward the end of the song, with the final refrain; the lyric in question is "Guiding my heart to find/This place where I belong/It was your song/It was your song/It's always been your song." In the live version, Brooks briefly becomes emotional when singing the second "It was your song" before composing himself to end the song. Brooks maintains his composure throughout the final refrain (as well as the rest of the song) in the studio version.

== Critical reception ==
The song was given mixed reviews by musical critics: Mark Guarino of the Arlington Heights, Illinois Daily Herald called the song "earnestness at its slickest", while Ann Powers of The New York Times said that it was "splendidly corny".

== Release history ==
The live version from Double Live and an alternate studio recording were both released to radio at the same time. Brooks also considered remixing the song especially for an alternate music video which would air on VH1, although a music video had already been shipped to the country music station CMT.

== Chart positions ==
"It's Your Song" debuted at number 33 on the Billboard Hot Country Singles & Tracks (now Hot Country Songs) charts dated for November 14, 1998. It entered the Top 10 at number 10 one week later, then peaked at number 9 on the chart dated for November 28 (only its third week on the chart) before falling to number 10 and beginning its descent. Overall, "It's Your Song" spent 20 weeks on the country charts.

It also spent three weeks on the Billboard Hot 100, peaking at number 62 there, becoming the first Billboard Hot 100 entry in his career. In addition, "It's Your Song" reached number 5 on the RPM Country Tracks charts in Canada. After its chart run was finished, Brooks released three singles under the pseudonym Chris Gaines as part of an aborted side project. He did not chart on the country charts as Garth Brooks again until "Do What You Gotta Do" (from his previous album, Sevens) in mid-2000.

Chart (1998–1999)	Peak position
Canada Country Singles (RPM)	5
US Billboard Hot 100	62
US Hot Country Songs (Billboard)	9
