= Live From Central Park =

Live From Central Park may refer to:

- Garth: Live from Central Park, a 1997 Garth Brooks concert
- Sheryl Crow and Friends: Live from Central Park, a 1999 live Sheryl Crow album
