= Mom (Bonnie Tyler song) =

2012 song by Bonnie Tyler

Song by Bonnie Tyler

from the album Rocks and Honey
- Released: 8 March 2013
- Recorded: 2012
- Genre: Country
- Length: 3:54
- Label: ZYX Music
- Songwriters: Wynn Varble, Don Sampson
- Producer: David Huff

"Mom" is a song recorded by Welsh singer Bonnie Tyler for her album Rocks and Honey (2013). Country superstar Garth Brooks covered the song on his 2014 album Man Against Machine.

== Background ==
Bonnie Tyler first heard the song being performed at a session in the Bluebird Cafe, Nashville, Tennessee. She selected the song to appear on Rocks and Honey.

== Critical reception ==
Carys Jones from Entertainment Focus described "Mom" as "a beautifully written song."

== Garth Brooks version ==
"Mom"

Single by Garth Brooks

from the album Man Against Machine
- Released: 24 November 2014
- Studio: Allentown Studios (Nashville, Tennessee)
- Genre: Country
- Length: 4:03
- Label: Pearl; RCA Nashville
- Songwriters: Wynn Varble; Don Sampson
- Producer: Mark Miller

Garth Brooks singles chronology
| "People Loving People" (2014) | "Mom" (2014) | "Baby, Let's Lay Down and Dance" (2016) |

Garth Brooks covered the song on his 2014 album Man Against Machine. He performed it live on Good Morning America in November 2014, receiving a great deal of media attention in promotion of his album. It was released as the album's second single on November 24, 2014, available for digital download exclusively through Brooks' online music store, GhostTunes.

=== Chart performance ===
| Chart (2014–2015) | Peak position |
|---|---|
| Canada Country (Billboard) | 36 |
| US Country Airplay (Billboard) | 32 |
| US Hot Country Songs (Billboard) | 49 |

== Other versions ==
A version by The Nashville Nuggets debuted at number 46 on the Billboard Hot Country Songs chart for the week of December 13, 2014. The Nashville Nuggets is a recording name of Wynn Varble and Don Sampson, the song's writers.
