= People Loving People =

2014 single by Garth Brooks

Single by Garth Brooks

from the album Man Against Machine
- B-side: "Send 'Em On Down the Road"
- Released: September 3, 2014
- Studio: Allentown Studios (Nashville, Tennessee)
- Genre: Country
- Length: 3:38
- Label: RCA Nashville; Pearl
- Songwriter(s): busbee Lee Thomas Miller; Chris Wallin
- Producer(s): Mark Miller

Garth Brooks singles chronology
"The Call" (2013)	"People Loving People" (2014)	"Mom" (2014)

"People Loving People" is a song recorded by American country music singer Garth Brooks for his eleventh studio album, Man Against Machine (2014). It was released to country radio by RCA Nashville on September 3, 2014 and is the first single from the album. Following its radio release, "People Loving People" was made available for digital download exclusively through Brooks' online music store, GhostTunes.

== Release and promotion ==
The song was released on September 3, 2014 and is Brooks' first radio release since his 2007 song "More Than a Memory". On September 4, 2014 Brooks appeared on Good Morning America to promote "People Loving People", as well as his world tour. On November 23, he performed the song live on the American Music Awards via satellite from his concert at the Greensboro Coliseum in Greensboro, North Carolina.

== Composition ==
"People Loving People" was written by Busbee, Lee Thomas Miller, and Chris Wallin. Like all songs featured on Brooks' album Man Against Machine, the song was produced by Mark Miller. Musically, the song was described as "firm, crunchy country rock" by Elias Leight from Billboard. Lyrically, like Brooks' 1992 song "We Shall Be Free", "People Loving People" addresses problems in the world. The song suggests the only solution to these problems is, as stated in the chorus, "people loving people/That's the enemy of everything that's evil".

== Chart performance ==
"People Loving People" debuted (and peaked) at #19 on the US Billboard Country Airplay chart for the chart dated September 20, 2014.

Chart (2014)	Peak position
Canada Country (Billboard)	10
US Bubbling Under Hot 100 Singles (Billboard)	4
US Country Airplay (Billboard)	19
US Hot Country Songs (Billboard)	25

=== Year-end charts ===
Chart (2014)	Position
US Country Airplay (Billboard)	98
