= Longneck Bottle =

Single by Garth Brooks

from the album Sevens
- B-side: "Rollin'"
- Released: November 22, 1997
- Studio: Jack's Tracks (Nashville, Tennessee)
- Genre: Country
- Length: 2:17
- Label: Capitol Nashville 19851
- Songwriters: Rick Carnes, Steve Wariner
- Producer: Allen Reynolds

Garth Brooks singles chronology
"In Another's Eyes" (1997)	"Longneck Bottle" (1997)	"She's Gonna Make It" (1998)

"Longneck Bottle" is a song written by Steve Wariner and Rick Carnes, and recorded by American country music artist Garth Brooks. It was released in November 1997 as the first single from his album Sevens. Wariner also plays acoustic guitar and sings background vocals on the song.

== Content ==
The song is an upbeat Western swing shuffle in the key of D major, with an approximate tempo of 176 beats per minute and a vocal range of C♯_{2}-A_{5}. Steve Wariner, who co-wrote the song, sings vocal harmony and plays lead guitar on the track.

== History ==
The song's b-side, "Rollin'," was an album track from Brooks's last studio album, 1995's Fresh Horses. That song had charted in late 1995, reaching No. 71 on the Billboard country charts for the week of December 9.

Released as a single in late 1997, "Longneck Bottle" was added to the playlists of all 222 stations that were surveyed by Radio & Records magazine at the time.

On the RPM Country Tracks charts in Canada, it debuted at #60 for the week of December 1, 1997, and was Number One only one week later. It held the Number One position on the chart week of December 15 as well, while the charts for the next three weeks (December 22, December 29, and January 5) were all frozen. January 12, 1998, the next RPM chart to be published, also had the song at Number One, although it fell to #2 the next week when "Don't Be Stupid (You Know I Love You)" by Shania Twain took over. "Longneck Bottle" reclaimed the Number One position on this chart on January 26, for its fourth and final week at Number One in Canada.

== Personnel ==
Per liner notes.

- Garth Brooks – lead and backing vocals
- Bruce Bouton – pedal steel guitar
- Mark Casstevens – acoustic guitar
- Mike Chapman – bass guitar
- Rob Hajacos – fiddle
- Chris Leuzinger – electric guitar
- Milton Sledge – drums
- Steve Wariner – acoustic guitar, background vocals
- Bobby Wood – piano

== Chart positions ==
Chart (1997)	Peak position
Canada Country Singles (RPM)	1
US Hot Country Songs (Billboard)	1

=== Year-end charts ===
Chart (1998)	Position
Canada Country Tracks (RPM)	21
US Country Songs (Billboard)	52
