= Dan Roberts (singer) =

American singer-songwriter

Dan Roberts is an American solo artist and songwriter. He has penned numerous Billboard chart songs including several for Garth Brooks.

Prior to moving to Nashville, Tennessee, Roberts spent time briefly as an amateur bronco rider. In Nashville, Roberts teamed up with Brooks and Bryan Kennedy to write the number one hit "The Beaches of Cheyenne". Brooks signed Roberts and Kennedy to a two-year deal to open his world tour in 1996-97. The duo opened more Garth Brooks shows than any other opening act in Brooks' career. Following the tour, Roberts wrote an album for himself titled There's a Little Cowboy in All of Us. He followed this up with a second CD Cowhand.com, which charted on both Gavin and Billboard.

His third CD, Viva La Cowboy was in contention for three Grammy nominations in 2004 and featured two chart singles on the Texas Music Chart, "I'm the One to Call" and "Swingin' Till We Can't See Strait".

His music career and life took on new meaning after his daughter, Austin, fought and won a two-year battle with brain cancer. Dan and his wife Carol established the Refuse To Lose Fund with the goal to raise $4.5 million to purchase the same technology that saved his daughters life at UCLA Medical Center in Los Angeles, California, and bring it to Cook Children's Medical Center in Fort Worth, Texas.

Roberts has had two more albums, Beyond the Brand and Family, Faith & Freedom, which he says is a tribute to the music that shaped his life. A compilation album, The Best Of, is his latest release.

== Awards ==
Roberts was awarded the Academy of Western Artists "Western Music (Male)" award in 2000, and "Entertainer of the Year" in 2001. Roberts won the 2004 Terry Awards Entertainer of the Year. The National Cowboy & Western Heritage Museum granted Roberts two Western Heritage Awards: in 2009, Outstanding Original Western Composition for Red Steagall's A Cowboy's Special Christmas (written with Roy Robinson and Bobby Wood), and in 2012, Outstanding Traditional Western Album for his "Best Of (Vol 1)" collection.
