= Man Against Machine =

Studio album by Garth Brooks
- Released: November 11, 2014
- Studios: Allentown Studios (Nashville, Tennessee)
- Genres: Country pop; pop rock
- Length: 57:43
- Labels: RCA Nashville; Pearl
- Producer: Mark Miller

Garth Brooks chronology
Blame It All on My Roots: Five Decades of Influences (2013)	Man Against Machine (2014)	The Ultimate Collection (2016)

Singles from Man Against Machine
- 1. "People Loving People" Released: September 3, 2014; 2. "Mom" Released: November 24, 2014

Man Against Machine is the ninth studio album by American country music artist Garth Brooks. It was released on November 11, 2014, by RCA Records Nashville and Pearl Records. Brooks confirmed the album in July 2014 while announcing his comeback world tour. Brooks' first new studio album since Scarecrow, which was released in 2001, it was his first album released digitally, exclusively to his online music store, GhostTunes. The album's lead single, "People Loving People", was released on September 3, 2014.

Prior to the album's release, Brooks told CMT that regardless of the album's chart performance, he does not plan on following the charts, believing that "quality music will show success over time, regardless of initial sales numbers." As of 2016, the album sold less than Brooks' previous efforts, having received considerably less support from radio but has gained generally favorable reviews. Brooks' decision to not release the album via iTunes contributed to its poor digital sales.

== Background ==
In October 2000, Brooks announced his retirement from recording and performing. His final studio album at the time, Scarecrow, was released in 2001. Nine years later, Brooks announced he was coming out of retirement to perform a series of weekend concerts at Encore Las Vegas, titled Garth at Wynn. Following the conclusion of his Las Vegas residency shows, Brooks announced plans for a world tour during a December 2013 appearance on Good Morning America.

On July 10, 2014, Brooks held a press conference where he confirmed a world tour and announced plans for a new album. The album would be Brooks' first album released digitally, available only through Brooks' online music store GhostTunes. The original release date was November 28, 2014; however it was later changed to November 11, 2014. Prior to the album's release GhostTunes featured a digital preorder, providing immediate downloads of the first released single, "People Loving People", as well as "Send 'Em On Down the Road". Brooks performed "Mom" during a November 7, 2014, appearance on Good Morning America, receiving a great deal of media attention in promotion of the album. The album was released on November 11, 2014.

== Release and promotion ==
On July 10, 2014, Brooks held a press conference where he confirmed a world tour and announced plans for a new album. The album would be Brooks' first album released digitally, available only through Brooks' online music store, GhostTunes. The original release date was November 28, 2014; however it was later changed to November 11, 2014.

Prior to the album's release, GhostTunes featured a digital preorder, providing immediate downloads of the first released single, "People Loving People", as well as B-side track, "Send 'Em On Down the Road", on September 3, 2014. On November 24, the album's second single, "Mom", was released. Brooks performed the song during an appearance on Good Morning America, receiving a great deal of media attention. The album was released on November 11, 2014.

== Critical reception ==
Professional ratings
Aggregate scores
Source	Rating
Metacritic	68/100
Review scores
Source	Rating
The A.V. Club	C
AllMusic	3.5/5 stars
Billboard	3.5/5 stars
The Buffalo News	2.5/4 stars
Entertainment Weekly	B+
Las Vegas Weekly	2/5 stars
Los Angeles Times	3/4 stars
New York Daily News	2/5 stars
The Plain Dealer	A+
Rolling Stone	3.5/5 stars
Tampa Bay Times	B
USA Today	3/4 stars

At Metacritic, which assigns a "weighted average" rating out of 100 to selected independent ratings and reviews from mainstream critics, the album has received a Metascore of 68, based on 9 reviews, indicating "generally favorable reviews".

Three and a half star reviewer for AllMusic, Stephen Thomas Erlewine writes: "There are no surprises, but that's what's welcome about Man Against Machine. Brooks doesn't try to do anything differently; he just picks up where he left off and the time away has only made it clearer how he's different from all that came before and all that came since." Writing for Rolling Stone and rating the album three and a half out of five stars, Christopher Weingarten states: "Garth Brooks returns with one of the year's best accidental rock albums... With ripping guitar solos, Aerosmith-style strings and gospel-tinged background vocals, this is a record that could take Eric to Church." In rating the album a B+ for Entertainment Weekly, Madison Vain claims: "Thirteen years after his last LP, the country superstar returns with Man Against Machine, an album brimming with arena-size anthems, glossy production, and intimate storytelling." Mikael Wood gave a rating of three stars out of four for the Los Angeles Times publication, where he suggests: "His primary weapon – and the quality that most sets him apart from the country stars who've surfaced in his wake – is his earnestness. The singer's aggressive sincerity remains intact." In another three out of four star review for USA Today, Jerry Shriver comments: "Brooks' first album of original material since 2001's Scarecrow, fits comfortably in the country mainstream that he once defined, yet doesn't sound dated... Mostly, though, there are well-constructed songs with singalong melodies and a sturdy voice that show that a decade of rest has served Brooks well." Jon Caramanica for The New York Times looked on the album positively, writing: "His first album of original music since 2001, is defiantly behind the times, and skillful enough — mostly — to transcend them." In rating the album three and a half out of five stars for Billboard, Melinda Newman claims: "Man Against Machine is no reinvention, but rather a continuation... So Brooks does the only thing he can: writing and finding songs that reflect where he is now, but staying true to the quality and tone of his past work... A rowdy, vintage-Brooks-style slam-dunk like "Friends in Low Places" or "Fever" is missing here, but that's a small complaint for such a solid return." Reviewing and rating the album an A+ The Plain Dealer, Chuck Yarborough says: "He's still got it, as I said. But even more important, now he's sharing it with us again." The Tampa Bay Times rating the music a B, Sean Daly reports: "But Garth's limitations never kept him from becoming one of the bestselling artists of all time, genres be darned. If anything, his phenomenal success is partly hinged on a common-schlub relatability... But he nevertheless gets dark for a reason: Whining is for puppies. Old dogs just growl and wag on."

In a two star out of five review, Jim Faber from the New York Daily News publication opines: "He should have waited longer." Writing for The A.V. Club and rating the album a C, Laura M. Browning remarks: "For a man who helped lead the charge of bringing country to the mainstream, Man Against Machine relies neither on Brooks' country backbone nor his love of rock... Instead of building on Brooks' strengths, Man Against Machine is firmly rooted in midair." Sarah Rodman for The Boston Globe newspaper gave a mixed impression of the music, where she states: "Presumably for this momentous release, which would be showcased on his current tour, Brooks was offered the best tunes available. (He also co-wrote three.) But that blandly uplifting first taste was underwhelming... The rest of "Machine" ascends from there, but only sporadically matches Brooks at his peak. The baker's dozen tracks on the collection break like so: two classics, six above-average cuts, and six songs, like "People," that are just fine." In an unfavorable review from Omaha World-Herald, Kevin Coffey suggests: "There's very little to make any of these songs stand out among a crowded field of country artists and especially not amid Brooks's already crowded catalog of hits... If Brooks were to reissue "The Hits," I doubt any of these tunes would make the cut." Two and a half star reviewer for The Buffalo News, Jeff Miers suggests: "Man Against Machine" arrives naked and unassuming, though. The contemporary country scene acknowledges Brooks' influence – how could it possibly not? – but it doesn't necessarily want or need him around any longer... So welcome to the world of classic rock, Garth. Better not put too many new tunes in the set list. Stick to the hits, and nobody gets hurt." Rating the project two stars for Las Vegas Weekly, Josh Bell finds: "Man Against Machine isn't desperate or pandering, but it is bland and mediocre, far from the momentous return Brooks' fans have been waiting for all these years."

== Commercial performance ==
According to industry sources, the album was originally estimated to sell between 250,000 and 300,000 copies in the US in its first week of release; but the estimate was later reduced to 140,000. It was predicted to fall behind Pink Floyd's The Endless River, Foo Fighters' Sonic Highways and Taylor Swift's 1989 on the Billboard 200.

The album debuted at number four on the Billboard 200 and number one on the US Top Country Albums Chart, selling an initial 130,000 copies, below even the downward-revised prediction. On January 9, 2015 the album was certified gold and platinum by the RIAA. As of November 2016, it has sold 685,000 copies in the US, making it Brooks's lowest selling studio effort until the following album Gunslinger.

In Canada, the album debuted at number four on the Canadian Albums Chart, initially selling 8,500 copies.

According to Brooks via an interview with CMT, he did not plan on following the album's chart performance, believing that "quality music will show success over time, regardless of initial sales numbers."

== Track listing ==
No.	Title	Writer(s)	Length
1.	"Man Against Machine"	Larry Bastian; Jenny Yates; Garth Brooks	5:17
2.	"She's Tired of Boys"	Amanda Williams; Brooks	5:08
3.	"Cold Like That"	Steven Lee Olsen; Melissa Peirce; Chris Wallin	5:05
4.	"All-American Kid"	Craig Campbell; Brice Long; Terry McBride	4:27
5.	"Mom"	Don Sampson; Wynn Varble	4:03
6.	"Wrong About You"	Adam Wright	1:55
7.	"Rodeo and Juliet"	Bryan Kennedy; Brooks	2:25
8.	"Midnight Train"	Peirce; Matthew A. Rossi	5:19
9.	"Cowboys Forever"	Varble; John Martin; Dean Dillon	3:46
10.	"People Loving People"	Lee Thomas Miller; Wallin; Busbee	3:39
11.	"Send 'Em On Down the Road"	Marc Beeson; Allen Shamblin	4:14
12.	"Fish"	Wallin; Varble	4:35
13.	"You Wreck Me"	Stephanie Bentley; Kevin Kadish; Dan Muckala	4:04
14.	"Tacoma"	Caitlyn Smith; Bob DiPiero	3:46
Total length:			57:43

== Personnel ==
The following credits are sourced from liner notes included in the album.

Musicians

- Sam Bacco – percussion
- Robert Bailey – backing vocals
- Eddie Bayers – drums, percussion
- Larry Beaird – acoustic guitar
- Marc Beeson – backing vocals
- Richard Bennett – acoustic guitar
- Bruce Bouton – steel guitar
- Garth Brooks – lead and backing vocals
- Dennis Burnside – string arrangements
- David Campbell – string arrangements, conductor
- Mike Chapman – bass guitar
- Jerry Douglas – Dobro
- Kenny Greenberg – electric and acoustic guitars
- Rob Hajacos – fiddle
- Vicki Hampton – backing vocals
- Kevin Kadish – backing vocals
- Chris Leuzinger – electric and acoustic guitars
- Blair Masters – piano, Wurlitzer electric piano, Hammond B-3 organ, synthesizer
- Jimmy Mattingly – fiddle
- Greg Morrow – drums, percussion
- Steven Lee Olsen – backing vocals
- Billy Panda – acoustic guitar, mandolin
- Karyn Rochelle – backing vocals
- Milton Sledge – drums, percussion
- Jimmie Lee Sloas – bass guitar
- Bryan Sutton – acoustic guitar, mandolin
- Bobby Wood – piano, Wurlitzer electric piano, Hammond B-3 organ, synthesizer
- Glenn Worf – bass guitar
- Trisha Yearwood – backing vocals
- Nashville String Machine – string orchestra

Additional staff

- Matthew "Buster" Allen – recording engineer
- Don Cobb – mastering engineer
- Eric Conn – mastering engineer
- John Kelton – engineer
- Mark Miller – producer

== Charts ==
=== Weekly charts ===
Chart (2014–15)	Peak position
Australian Albums (ARIA)	11
Canadian Albums (Billboard)	4
German Albums (Offizielle Top 100)	74
Irish Albums (IRMA)	12
Scottish Albums (Official Charts)	13
UK Albums (Official Charts)	23
US Billboard 200	4
US Top Country Albums (Billboard)	1

=== Year-end charts ===
Chart (2014)	Position
US Billboard 200	152
US Top Country Albums (Billboard)	34
Chart (2015)	Position
Canadian Albums (Billboard)	37
US Billboard 200	50
US Top Country Albums (Billboard)	5

=== Singles ===
Year	Single	Peak chart positions			
Year	Single	US Country	US Country Airplay	US	CAN Country
2014	"People Loving People"	25	19	104	10
2014	"Mom"	49	32	—	36
"—" denotes releases that did not chart

== Sales and certifications ==
Region	Certification	Certified units/sales
Canada (Music Canada)	Gold	40,000^{^}
United States (RIAA)	2× Platinum	2,000,000^{‡}
^{^} Shipments figures based on certification alone.^{‡} Sales+streaming figures based on certification alone.

== Release history ==
List of release dates, formats, label, and reference
Date	Edition	Format(s)	Label	Ref.
November 11, 2014	Standard	CD; digital download (exclusive to GhostTunes)	RCA Nashville; Pearl	
