= Thicker Than Blood (song) =

Single by Garth Brooks

from the album Scarecrow
- Released: May 29, 2002
- Studio: Jack's Tracks (Nashville, Tennessee)
- Genre: Country
- Length: 2:53
- Label: Capitol Nashville
- Songwriters: Garth Brooks; Jenny Yates
- Producer: Allen Reynolds

Garth Brooks singles chronology
"Squeeze Me In" (2002)	"Thicker Than Blood" (2002)	"Why Ain't I Running" (2003)

"Thicker Than Blood" is a song co-written and recorded by American country music artist Garth Brooks. It was released in May 2002 as the third single from the album Scarecrow. The song reached number 18 on the Billboard Hot Country Singles & Tracks chart. It was written by Brooks and Jenny Yates.

== Background and writing ==
According to the liner notes, the song is about Brooks's father, who served in the United States Marine Corps. Brooks also said that he did not want to refer to his father as an "ex-Marine", but could not find any other way to describe him while fitting the song's meter.

== Chart performance ==
"Thicker Than Blood" debuted at number 58 on the Hot Country Singles & Tracks chart dated December 1, 2001, based on unsolicited airplay following the album's release. The song officially re-entered at number 60 on the chart dated June 15, 2002.

Chart (2002)	Peak position
US Hot Country Songs (Billboard)	18
US Bubbling Under Hot 100 (Billboard)	14
