= It's Midnight Cinderella =

Single by Garth Brooks

from the album Fresh Horses
- Released: June 10, 1996
- Studio: Jack's Tracks (Nashville, Tennessee)
- Genre: Country
- Length: 2:23
- Label: Capitol Nashville
- Songwriters: Kent Blazy; Kim Williams; Garth Brooks
- Producer: Allen Reynolds

Garth Brooks singles chronology
"The Change" (1996)	"It's Midnight Cinderella" (1996)	"That Ol' Wind" (1996)

"It's Midnight Cinderella" is a song co-written and recorded by American country music singer Garth Brooks. It was released in June 1996 as the fifth single from his album Fresh Horses. The song reached a peak of number 5 on the U.S. country charts in mid-1996. It was written by Brooks, Kent Blazy and Kim Williams.

== Content ==
"It's Midnight Cinderella" is an up-tempo where the male narrator makes passes on a female via allusions to the Cinderella fairy tale.

In the verses, it is revealed that the female's partner has left her ("I guess your Prince Charming wasn't, after all"). The narrator, in the second verse, then describes his plan to have sex with her ("Gonna learn to love midnight inside this pumpkin shell").

== Critical reception ==
Stephen Thomas Erlewine of Allmusic cited the song as a standout track on Fresh Horses, calling the song "sassy" and "suggestive", and saying that it worked because Brooks "lets his guard down" on the song. Alanna Nash of Entertainment Weekly called it a "bordering-on-risqué fairy tale[…] that adventrously [sic] pushes the envelope of country lyrics."

== Chart performance ==
"It's Midnight Cinderella" made its chart debut on Billboard Hot Country Singles & Tracks (now Hot Country Songs) in December 1995 after the album's release, as an album cut along with "That Ol' Wind", "Rollin'", and then-current single "The Beaches of Cheyenne". The song charted for several weeks as an album cut before reaching Top 40 on the chart week of July 20, 1996, and peaked at number 5 on the chart week of September 7.

Chart (1996)	Peak position
Canada Country Singles (RPM)	2
US Hot Country Songs (Billboard)	5

=== Year-end charts ===
Chart (1996)	Position
Canada Country Tracks (RPM)	31
