= She's Gonna Make It =

Single by Garth Brooks

from the album Sevens
- Released: January 15, 1998
- Recorded: 1997
- Studio: Jack's Tracks (Nashville, Tennessee)
- Genre: Country
- Length: 2:45
- Label: Capitol Nashville
- Songwriters: Kent Blazy, Kim Williams, Garth Brooks
- Producer: Allen Reynolds

Garth Brooks singles chronology
"Longneck Bottle" (1997)	"She's Gonna Make It" (1998)	"Two Piña Coladas" (1998)

"She's Gonna Make It" is a song co-written and recorded by American country music artist Garth Brooks. It was released in January 1998 as the second single from his album Sevens. It peaked at number two on the U.S. country singles chart, and lasted 20 weeks on the Billboard chart, while it was a number-one country song in Canada. The song was written by Brooks, Kent Blazy and Kim Williams.

== Chart positions ==
"She's Gonna Make It" re-entered the chart as an official single at number 53 on the U.S. Billboard Hot Country Singles & Tracks for the week of January 17, 1998.

Chart (1998)	Peak position
Canada Country Singles (RPM)	1
US Hot Country Songs (Billboard)	2

=== Year-end charts ===
Chart (1998)	Position
Canada Country Tracks (RPM)	19
US Country Songs (Billboard)	51
