= You Move Me =

Single by Garth Brooks

from the album Sevens
- Released: August 24, 1998
- Recorded: 1997
- Studio: Jack's Tracks (Nashville, Tennessee)
- Genre: Country
- Length: 4:35
- Label: Capitol Nashville
- Songwriters: Gordon Kennedy, Pierce Pettis
- Producer: Allen Reynolds

Garth Brooks singles chronology
| "Burnin' the Roadhouse Down" (1998) | "You Move Me" (1998) | "It's Your Song" (1998) |

"You Move Me" is a song co-written by Gordon Kennedy and Pierce Pettis and originally recorded by American contemporary Christian music singer Susan Ashton in 1996. It was recorded by American country music artist Garth Brooks (Ashton had opened for Brooks on the second leg of his 1994 European tour and provided harmony vocals on his 1997 tour of Ireland) and was released as the fourth single from his album Sevens in 1998. It hit No. 3 on the Billboard Hot Country Singles & Tracks chart and reached No. 1 on the Canadian RPM Country Tracks chart.

== Content ==
This song is a mostly acoustic mid-tempo song with electric guitar flourishes. The narrator talks about how his lover moves him, gets him off his feet, moves him forward, etc.

== Chart performance ==
| Chart (1998) | Peak position |
|---|---|
| Canada Country Singles (RPM) | 1 |
| US Hot Country Songs (Billboard) | 3 |

=== Year-end charts ===
| Chart (1998) | Position |
|---|---|
| Canada Country Tracks (RPM) | 35 |
| US Country Songs (Billboard) | 73 |
