= Garth Brooks in... the Life of Chris Gaines =

Garth Brooks in...the Life of Chris Gaines

Studio album by Garth Brooks (as Chris Gaines)
- Released: September 28, 1999
- Studios: Ocean Way (Nashville, Tennessee); OmniSound (Nashville, Tennessee); Quad Studios (Nashville, Tennessee); The Beanstalk (Franklin, Tennessee); Record Plant (Los Angeles, California)
- Genres: Pop; pop rock; alternative rock
- Length: 56:23
- Label: Capitol
- Producer: Don Was

Garth Brooks chronology
Double Live (1998)	Garth Brooks in...the Life of Chris Gaines (1999)	Garth Brooks and the Magic of Christmas (1999)

Garth Brooks in...the Life of Chris Gaines is an album by American country musician Garth Brooks, in which Brooks assumes the fictitious persona of Australian rock and roll artist Chris Gaines.

The album spawned a hit single and sold over two million copies in the United States, but was considered a commercial disappointment relative to Brooks' earlier success in country music. His use of an alternate persona caused widespread confusion among the public and contributed to the album's lackluster reception.

== Background and release ==
Originally, this album was intended to be the soundtrack for a movie called The Lamb that would star Brooks as a rock star recalling the different periods of his life. This album was purposely released a year in advance from the scheduled film release date to pique interest in Brooks performing rock instead of country. The Lamb, however, was never filmed due to financial and management problems.

The album was released on September 28, 1999. It reached No. 2 on the US Billboard 200 chart and also gave Brooks his first and as of 2026 only appearance in the top 40 of the US Billboard Hot 100, with "Lost in You", which peaked at No. 5. The track "It Don't Matter to the Sun" was later covered in 2005, by Rosie Thomas on her If Songs Could Be Held album, and later as a duet between Don Henley and Stevie Nicks on the Target edition of Henley's 2015 album Cass County. The track "Right Now" samples the chorus of The Youngbloods' 1969 hit "Get Together", while the track "Maybe" was previously recorded by Alison Krauss on her 1999 album Forget About It.

On November 13, 1999, Brooks hosted Saturday Night Live as himself but performed the musical number ("Way of the Girl") as Chris Gaines without acknowledging to the audience that they were the same person.

The album sales were disappointing compared to Brooks' previous work, with some observers citing Brooks' use of wig and makeup to assume a new appearance for the concept album as a factor in the commercial disappointment for the Gaines project.

== Reception ==
Professional ratings
Review scores
Source	Rating
AllMusic	3/5 stars
The A.V. Club	(mixed)
Christgau's Consumer Guide	(dud)
The Daily Vault	B−
Entertainment Weekly	C−
Mojo	(favorable)
PopMatters	(favorable)
Q	3/5 stars
Rolling Stone	2.5/5 stars

Garth Brooks in... The Life of Chris Gaines peaked at No. 2 on the U.S. Billboard 200, and peaked at No. 5 on the Canadian Albums Chart. In November 1999, it was certified 2× Platinum by the RIAA, but was considered a disappointment relative to Brooks' other albums.

Critical reviews were mixed, often noting widespread confusion or consternation among the public regarding Brooks' use of an alternate persona for the album. Allmusic gave the album 3 stars out of 5, writing: "While the tunes might not have much flair, they're all sturdy" and show occasional similarities to John Mellencamp or The Beatles. "Judged as Brooks' first pop album, it's pretty good", wrote critic Stephen Thomas Erlewine who believed it might have been an even greater success with more straightforward marketing as Brooks' first pop-rock album. The AV Club said "at times, it works" and noted Brooks seemed to enjoy "break[ing] out of the rigid confines of country radio" with songs influenced by The Wallflowers or funk music, but the overall album suffered because despite some good moments other material was "cheesy and watered-down". Christopher Thalen of Daily Vault ranked the album at a B−, writing it was "a slightly hesitant first step into a new musical world for Brooks that succeeds more often than it fails - but when it stumbles, it falls hard." A harshly negative review came from Robert Christgau, whose reviews of Brooks' country music were generally positive but who gave the Chris Gaines album a "dud" review consisting only of a small icon of a bomb with a lit fuse.

== Track listing ==
Garth Brooks in...the Life of Chris Gaines
No.	Title	Writer(s)	Length
1.	"That's the Way I Remember It"	Tommy Sims; Tony Arata	4:29
2.	"Lost in You"	Gordon Kennedy; Wayne Kirkpatrick; Sims	3:05
3.	"Snow in July"	Kennedy; Kirkpatrick; Mike More; Andrew Logan	4:20
4.	"Driftin' Away"	Sims	4:56
5.	"Way of the Girl"	Kennedy	3:44
6.	"Unsigned Letter"	Kennedy; Kirkpatrick	4:17
7.	"It Don't Matter to the Sun"	Kennedy; Kirkpatrick; Sims	4:21
8.	"Right Now"	Cheryl Wheeler; Chet Powers	3:24
9.	"Main Street"	Kennedy; Kirkpatrick; Trisha Yearwood	4:12
10.	"White Flag"	Kennedy; Kirkpatrick	4:45
11.	"Digging for Gold"	Kennedy; Kirkpatrick	5:08
12.	"Maybe"	Kennedy; Phil Madeira	5:11
13.	"My Love Tells Me So"	Kennedy; Kirkpatrick; Sims	4:33
Total length:			56:23

== Personnel ==
Musicians

- Garth Brooks (as Chris Gaines) – lead vocals, acoustic guitar
- Gordon Kennedy – acoustic guitar, electric guitar, bass (1–4, 7, 10–13), backing vocals, lead vocals (13)
- Reggie Young – electric guitar (4)
- Jimmie Lee Sloas – bass (5, 6, 8)
- James "Hutch" Hutchison – bass (9)
- Wayne Kirkpatrick – keyboards, clavinet, acoustic guitar, drum programming, backing vocals
- Tommy Sims – keyboards, acoustic guitar, drum programming, backing vocals
- Blair Masters – keyboards (1, 3, 5, 6, 11)
- Mike Lawler – keyboards (3), clavinet (3)
- Greg Phillinganes – keyboards (3)
- Matt Rollings – keyboards (4)
- Rami Jaffee – Hammond B3 organ (9)
- Phil Madeira – Hammond B3 organ (10, 12), horn and string arrangements (12)
- Dan Needham – drums (1)
- Chris McHugh – drums, percussion, drum programming
- Eddie Bayers – drums (4)
- Kenny Aronoff – drums (9)
- Lenny Castro – percussion (3)
- Terry McMillan – percussion (12)
- Carl Marsh – horn and string arrangements (12), Fairlight horns (13)
- Carl Gorodetzky – string contractor (12)
- The Nashville String Machine – horns and strings (12)
- Lee Leavitt – vocal whispers (8)
- Crystal Taliefero – backing vocals (9)
- Kelly Shane – stock market reporter (11)
- Chris Harris – chanting (12)
- Mark Heimermann – chanting (12)

Technical personnel

- Don Was – production
- J.B. Baird – recording and mixing
- George Massenburg – recording and mixing (horns and strings)
- Glenn Spinner – recording and mixing
- Rik Pekkonen – recording

== Charts ==
=== Weekly charts ===
Weekly chart performance for Garth Brooks in...the Life of Chris Gaines
Chart (1999)	Peak position
Australian Albums (ARIA)	122
Canadian Albums (Billboard)	5
German Albums (Offizielle Top 100)	72
Irish Albums (Billboard)	1
Norwegian Albums (VG-lista)	13
US Billboard 200	2

=== Year-end charts ===
Annual chart performance for Garth Brooks in...the Life of Chris Gaines
Chart (1999)	Position
US Billboard 200	132

== Certifications ==
Certifications for Garth Brooks in...the Life of Chris Gaines
Region	Certification	Certified units/sales
Canada (Music Canada)	Platinum	100,000^{^}
United States (RIAA)	2× Platinum	2,000,000^{^}
^{^} Shipments figures based on certification alone.

== See also ==
- List of most expensive albums
