= Love Will Always Win =

Single by Garth Brooks with Trisha Yearwood

from the album The Lost Sessions
- Released: January 30, 2006
- Recorded: 2005
- Genre: Country
- Length: 4:41
- Label: Pearl; Lyric Street
- Songwriters: Gordon Kennedy; Wayne Kirkpatrick
- Producer: Allen Reynolds

Garth Brooks singles chronology
"Good Ride Cowboy" (2005)	"Love Will Always Win" (2006)	"That Girl Is a Cowboy" (2006)

Trisha Yearwood singles chronology
"Trying to Love You" (2005)	"Love Will Always Win" (2006)	"Heaven, Heartache and the Power of Love" (2007)

"Love Will Always Win" is a song written by Gordon Kennedy and Wayne Kirkpatrick. It was originally recorded by American country music artist Faith Hill for the international release of her 1998 album Faith, also titled Love Will Always Win. The track was later recorded by American singers Garth Brooks and Trisha Yearwood. It was released on February 4, 2006, as the second and final single from Brooks' box set The Limited Series (2005).

== History ==
Faith Hill cut the song in 1998 for the international release of her 1998 album Faith, produced by herself and Byron Gallimore. In 2005, Garth Brooks recorded the song as a duet with his wife, Trisha Yearwood, for the album The Lost Sessions, a compilation of new and previously unreleased material within his 2005 box set The Limited Series. Brooks and Yearwood performed the song on The Oprah Winfrey Show. Allen Reynolds, Brooks' longtime producer for two decades, produced their version of the song, although a review from Billboard magazine erroneously gave the production credit to the song's co-writers Gordon Kennedy and Wayne Kirkpatrick.

== Critical reception ==
Chuck Taylor reviewed the single favorably in Billboard, calling it "a beautiful and timeless song of devotion" and "simple and straightforward".

== Additional musicians ==
- Bruce Bouton – steel guitar
- Dennis Burnside – string arrangements
- Mark Casstevens – acoustic guitar
- Mike Chapman – bass
- Chris Leuzinger – gut string and electric guitars
- Milton Sledge – drums
- Bobby Wood – keyboards
- The Nashville String Machine – string section
  - David Angell
  - Monisa Angell
  - David Davidson
  - Conni Ellison
  - Carl Gorodetzky
  - James Grosjean
  - Anthony Lamarchina
  - Carole Rabinowitz
  - Pamela Sixfin
  - Alan Umstead
  - Catherine Umstead
  - Gary Vanosdale
  - Mary Kathryn Vanosdale
  - Kristin Wilkinson

== Charts ==
Chart (2006)	Peak position
US Hot Country Songs (Billboard)	23
