= That Ol' Wind =

Single by Garth Brooks

from the album Fresh Horses
- Released: September 30, 1996
- Studio: Jack's Tracks (Nashville, Tennessee)
- Genre: Country
- Length: 5:23 (album version); 4:19 (radio edit)
- Label: Capitol Nashville
- Songwriters: Leigh Reynolds; Garth Brooks
- Producer: Allen Reynolds

Garth Brooks singles chronology
"It's Midnight Cinderella" (1996)	"That Ol' Wind" (1996)	"In Another's Eyes" (1997)

"That Ol' Wind" is a song co-written and recorded by American country music singer Garth Brooks. It was released on September 30, 1996, as the sixth and final single from his album Fresh Horses. The song peaked at number 4 on the U.S. country charts and number 3 on the Canadian country charts. It was written by Brooks and Leigh Reynolds.

== Content ==
"That Ol' Wind" is a mid-tempo ballad that chronicles two lovers who have been separated for some time. It begins with a female character who, upon dropping her child off at school, hears on the radio that an unnamed singer will be "back in town tonight for one last show." She attends his concert, where she reunites with her lover after a ten-year separation. Their reunion is described in the lyric "that ol' wind had once again found its way home." The bridge reveals that each of them have a secret. Her secret is that her son (mentioned in the first verse) is the unnamed singer's child. Born from their first one night stand, ten years earlier. His secret is that he has hidden some money. However, neither reveal their secrets to each other during the song. Because they are in love and happy, having found their way back to one another.

== Critical reception ==
Reviewing the album for Nashville Scene, Edward Morris said that "That Ol' Wind", "The Beaches of Cheyenne" and "Ireland" from the same album are "so powerful in what they reveal or demand of the human spirit that they render the competition trivial." Leigh Reynolds, who wrote the song with Brooks, received a Million-Air award from Broadcast Music Incorporated (BMI) once the song received one million spins at radio.

== Chart performance ==
In December 1995, "That Ol' Wind" made its chart debut as an album cut, along with "It's Midnight Cinderella" and "Rollin'", which also charted as album cuts, and "The Beaches of Cheyenne", his then-current single. "That Ol' Wind" spent several weeks on the charts as an album cut before officially being released to radio in late 1996, peaking at number 4 in December 1996.

Chart (1996)	Peak position
Canada Country Singles (RPM)	3
US Hot Country Songs (Billboard)	4
