= Why Ain't I Running =

Single by Garth Brooks

from the album Scarecrow
- Released: March 8, 2003
- Studio: Jack's Tracks (Nashville, Tennessee)
- Genre: Country
- Length: 4:32
- Label: Capitol Nashville
- Songwriter(s): Garth Brooks; Tony Arata; Kent Blazy
- Producer(s): Allen Reynolds

Garth Brooks singles chronology
"Thicker Than Blood" (2002)	"Why Ain't I Running" (2003)	"Good Ride Cowboy" (2005)

"Why Ain't I Running" is a song co-written and recorded by American country music artist Garth Brooks. It was released in March 2003 as the fourth and final single from the album Scarecrow. The song reached #24 on the Billboard Hot Country Singles & Tracks chart. The song was written by Brooks, Tony Arata and Kent Blazy.

== Chart performance ==
Chart (2003)	Peak position
US Hot Country Songs (Billboard)	24
