= The Limited Series (2005 album) =

Garth Brooks' music box set

The Limited Series (2005)

Box set by Garth Brooks
- Released: November 25, 2005
- Recorded: 1995–2005
- Studios: Jack's Tracks (Nashville, Tennessee)
- Genre: Country
- Label: Pearl
- Producer: Allen Reynolds

Garth Brooks chronology
Scarecrow (2001)	The Limited Series (2005) (2005)	The Lost Sessions (2005)

Professional ratings
Review scores
Source	Rating
About.com	(Expanded)
AllMusic	4/5 stars
Entertainment Weekly	B
Robert Christgau	(choice cut)
Stylus Magazine	C

The Limited Series is the name of Garth Brooks' second box set of albums. (It is also the name of his first box set). The set was released in 2005 to be sold exclusively at Wal-Mart and Sam's Club stores. It comprises his studio albums Sevens (1997) and Scarecrow (2001), the live album Double Live (1998), and a bonus CD entitled The Lost Sessions, which was also issued separately. The Lost Sessions also includes three singles: "Good Ride Cowboy", "Love Will Always Win" and "That Girl Is a Cowboy".

== Contents ==
The set contains the following previously released albums:

- Sevens
- Double Live
- Scarecrow

The Double Live album contained one of three new covers, themed much like the original album. These covers were of Brooks' live performances recorded after Double Live was released: The last show of Brooks' final tour in 2000, and the special concert aboard the USS Enterprise in 2001. A third cover shows special "behind the scenes" moments during Brooks' live tours.

The set contains an All Access DVD, containing footage from Brooks' live shows, as well as a photo gallery and the music videos for "Standing Outside the Fire", "Callin' Baton Rouge", "Wrapped Up in You" and "Ain't Goin' Down ('Til the Sun Comes Up)". The DVD also contains approximately 40 minutes of interviews with Brooks.

Just like the 1998 Limited Series box set, the 2005 box set contains a booklet with information about all the albums in the set, as well as the lyrics for the songs, in lieu of the usual CD booklets.

== Commercial performance ==
Due to Billboard chart rules that made albums exclusive to a specific retailer ineligible, The Limited Series was not able to chart on the Billboard 200 or Top Country Albums. Furthermore, "the racks that service [Wal-Mart] [...] opted to withhold reporting sales of this proprietary title to Nielsen SoundScan", leaving it also absent from Billboard charts that did allow exclusive titles, such as Top Comprehensive Albums. Billboard reported that according to "industry sources", the set sold "in the neighborhood of 300,000–400,000" copies in the three-day window of its opening week (having been released mid-week), while the official number one album that week, System of a Down's Hypnotize, sold 320,000 copies.

== The Lost Sessions ==
The Lost Sessions

Studio album by Garth Brooks
- Released: November 25, 2005 (box); February 7, 2006 (separate)
- Recorded: 1995–2005
- Genre: Country
- Length: 38:43 (Box set version); 62:34 (Separate Version)
- Label: Pearl
- Producer: Allen Reynolds

Garth Brooks chronology
The Limited Series (2005)	The Lost Sessions (2005)	The Ultimate Hits (2007)

The Limited Series contains The Lost Sessions, a studio album of previously unreleased material recorded by Brooks between 1995 and 2000, along with the newly recorded Chris LeDoux tribute, "Good Ride Cowboy". Shortly after the box set was released, The Lost Sessions was re-released individually, featuring six new songs, and a re-sequenced track listing. It also included a new version of "Good Ride Cowboy", which replaced the previous version's reference of "Navy" with "Air Force".

=== Track listing ===
==== Original release ====
1. "Fishin' in the Dark" (Wendy Waldman, Jim Photoglo) – 3:43
2. "That Girl Is a Cowboy" (Jerrod Niemann, Richie Brown, Garth Brooks) – 4:23
3. "Good Ride Cowboy" (Niemann, Brown, Bryan Kennedy, Bob Doyle) – 3:26
4. "For a Minute There" (Kent Blazy, Brooks) – 5:15
5. "Please Operator (Could You Trace This Call)" (Dewayne Blackwell) – 3:42
6. "I'd Rather Have Nothing" (Mike McClure) – 3:44
7. "American Dream" (Jenny Yates, Brooks; prelude by Dennis Burnside) – 1:52
8. "I'll Be the Wind" (Josh Kear, Mark Irwin) – 4:04
9. "My Baby No Está Aquí" (David Stephenson, Shane Stockton) – 2:49
10. "Allison Miranda" (Bobby Wood, Dan Roberts, Brooks) – 5:03
11. "Last Night I Had the Strangest Dream" (Ed McCurdy) – 3:31

==== The Lost Sessions ====
(Songs new to this release feature writing credits and song length; information for other tracks is same as above).

1. "Good Ride Cowboy" – 3:27
2. "Allison Miranda" – 5:05
3. "Love Will Always Win" (Gordon Kennedy, Wayne Kirkpatrick) – 4:41
  - Duet with Trisha Yearwood
4. "She Don't Care About Me" (Bruce Robison) – 2:57
5. "That Girl Is a Cowboy" – 4:24
6. "Fishin' in the Dark" – 3:43
7. "For a Minute There" – 5:16
8. "I'd Rather Have Nothing" – 3:47
9. "Cowgirl's Saddle" (Brooks, B. Kennedy, Gary McMahan) – 3:20
10. "Under the Table" (Brooks, Randy Taylor) – 3:04
11. "American Dream" – 1:54
12. "I'll Be the Wind" – 4:06
13. "Meet Me in Love" (Brooks, B. Kennedy, Wood) – 2:55
14. "You Can't Help Who You Love" (Marcus Hummon, Steve Wariner) – 3:47
15. "Please Operator (Could You Trace This Call)" – 3:45
16. "My Baby No Está Aquí" – 2:51
17. "Last Night I Had the Strangest Dream" – 3:32

=== Personnel ===
Compiled from liner notes.

- Garth Brooks – lead vocals, backing vocals, acoustic guitar
- Bobby Wood – keyboards
- Joey Miskulin – accordion
- Mark Casstevens – acoustic guitar, banjo, bouzouki
- Chris Leuzinger – electric guitars, gut string guitar
- Bruce Bouton – steel guitar, slide guitar
- Jerry Douglas – dobro
- Sam Bush – mandolin
- Ronnie McCoury – mandolin
- Mike Chapman – bass
- Milton Sledge – drums, percussion
- Sam Bacco – percussion
- Rob Hajacos – fiddle
- Jimmy Mattingly – fiddle
- Dennis Burnside – string arrangements
- The Nashville String Machine – strings
- Alison Krauss – backing vocals on "For a Minute There"
- Martina McBride – backing vocals on "I'll Be the Wind"
- Allen Reynolds – backing vocals on "Last Night I Had the Strangest Dream"
- Trisha Yearwood – backing vocals on "That Girl Is a Cowboy", "Please Operator", "Allison Miranda" and "Last Night I Had the Strangest Dream"
- The LeDouxers (background vocals on "Good Ride Cowboy") – Jerrod Niemann, Richie Brown, Bryan Kennedy, Joe Mansfield, David Gant, Bob Doyle, David Corlew, Carolyn Corlew, Jerry Joyner, Beau Serry, Jeff Kaplan, Terry Palmer, Mandy McCormack, Caryn Wariner, Steve Wariner, Jimmy Mattingly, Gary Birdwell, Karen Byrd, Tami Rose-Thompson, Lane Rose-Thompson, Jason Thompson, Polly Edwards and the B-3's (Taylor, August, and Colleen), Paul Bogart, Cale Lang, Phillip Bogart, Matt and Karen Lindsey, Cassandra Tormes, Rondal Richardson, The Leuzinger Gang (Chris, Mary, Jesse, and Elizabeth), Luellyn Latocki, Bruce Bouton, Patsi Bale Cox, and Tracy Greenwood.
- "The crickets on "Fishin' in the Dark" are performed by themselves."

== Certifications ==
Region	Certification	Certified units/sales
United States (RIAA)	3× Platinum	3,000,000^{^}
^{^} Shipments figures based on certification alone.
