= Two Piña Coladas =

- European Release

Single by Garth Brooks

from the album Sevens
- B-side: "To Make You Feel My Love" (EU CD single)
- Released: March 16, 1998
- Studio: Jack's Tracks (Nashville, Tennessee)
- Genre: Country pop; pop rock
- Length: 3:34
- Label: Capitol Nashville
- Songwriters: Shawn Camp; Benita Hill; Sandy Mason
- Producer: Allen Reynolds

Garth Brooks singles chronology
"She's Gonna Make It" (1997)	"Two Piña Coladas" (1998)	"To Make You Feel My Love" (1998)

"Two Piña Coladas" is a song recorded by American country music artist Garth Brooks. It was released in March 1998 as the third single from his album Sevens. It hit No. 1 on the Billboard Country Charts in 1998. A concert version is available on Double Live. The song was written by Shawn Camp, Benita Hill and Sandy Mason. Camp provides an additional acoustic guitar.

== The song ==
=== Content ===
A man feeling the blues (most likely a love problem), turns on the news when a person comes on, claiming that "heartaches are healed by the sea." Without a moment's notice, he heads down to the beach, eager for a night on the town. After two piña coladas, the man begins to feel elated, and at this point never wants to leave. The chorus also suggests that he continues drinking, specifically, drinking Captain Morgan, until he forgets his troubles and is happy.

=== The music ===
The song is in F major with an approximate tempo of 120 beats per minute and a moderate Latin music feel, punctuated by several acoustic guitar runs (mostly performed by Shawn Camp, the song's co-writer). A large crowd of singers joins Brooks on the song's final chorus.

"Two Piña Coladas" gained the number 29 position on the CMT 40 Greatest Drinking Songs: Morning After broadcast.

== Personnel ==
Per liner notes.

- "Big Al" – backing vocals
- Garth Brooks – lead and backing vocals
- Shawn Camp – acoustic guitar, backing vocals
- Mark Casstevens – acoustic guitar
- Mike Chapman – bass guitar
- "Double D" – backing vocals
- Sam "The Man" Duczer – backing vocals
- Charles Green – backing vocals
- Chris Leuzinger – electric guitar
- Mat Lindsey – backing vocals
- Sandy Mason – backing vocals
- Dorothy "The Birthday Girl" Robinson – backing vocals
- Milton Sledge – drums

== Chart positions ==
"Two Pina Coladas" debuted at number 50 on the U.S. Billboard Hot Country Singles & Tracks for the week of December 6, 1997.

Chart (1998)	Peak position
Canada Country Singles (RPM)	1
US Hot Country Songs (Billboard)	1

=== Year-end charts ===
Chart (1998)	Position
Canada Country Tracks (RPM)	33
US Country Songs (Billboard)	48
