= Lost in You (Chris Gaines song) =

Single by Chris Gaines

from the album Garth Brooks in... the Life of Chris Gaines
- B-side: "It Don't Matter to the Sun"
- Released: July 19, 1999
- Recorded: Soundstage Studios, Nashville, Tennessee
- Genre: R&B; soft rock; pop
- Length: 3:05
- Label: Capitol Nashville
- Songwriters: Gordon Kennedy; Wayne Kirkpatrick; Tommy Sims
- Producer: Don Was

Garth Brooks singles chronology
"It's Your Song" (1998)	"Lost in You" (1999)	"It Don't Matter to the Sun" (1999)

"Lost in You" is a song co-written by Gordon Kennedy, Wayne Kirkpatrick, and Tommy Sims. It was recorded by American country music artist Garth Brooks under the fictitious persona of Australian alternative rock artist Chris Gaines. It was released in July 1999 as the lead single from the album Garth Brooks in... the Life of Chris Gaines. Originally, the album was intended to be the soundtrack for a movie called The Lamb that would star Brooks as a rock star recalling the different periods of his life. The single was purposefully released over a year in advance from the scheduled film release date to pique interest in Brooks performing rock instead of country. The Lamb, however, was never filmed due to financial and management problems. It debuted and peaked at No. 5 on the U.S. Billboard Hot 100 chart, giving Garth Brooks his first, and (so far) only top 40 hit in his career.

== Critical reception ==
Deborah Evans Price, of Billboard magazine reviewed the song favorably saying that it is a "gentle, beautifully produced love song." She goes on to say that it contains easy beats, "supple guitar strumming" and a chorus that "flows like a lazy steam on the most pleasant of days."

== Music video ==
The music video was directed by Jon Small and premiered in mid-1999. The video also features Brooks portraying Chris Gaines in a room, barefooted and in black suit and pants, while people pass by him. The video was also included on the CD of the single along with "It Don't Matter to the Sun".

== Chart performance ==
=== Weekly charts ===
Chart (1999)	Peak position
Australia (ARIA)	175
Canada Top Singles (RPM)	45
Canada Adult Contemporary (RPM)	1
Canada Country Singles (RPM)	55
Hungary (Mahasz)	4
UK Singles Chart	70
US Billboard Hot 100	5
US Adult Contemporary (Billboard)	9
US Hot Country Songs (Billboard)	62

=== Certifications ===
Region	Certification	Certified units/sales
United States (RIAA)	Gold	700,000

== Other versions ==
The Irish pop band Westlife recorded a cover of the song on their album Turnaround in 2003 and performed it once live in Belfast for their Turnaround Tour.

In 2019, Childish Gambino covered the song for Triple J's Like a Version segment.
