= Squeeze Me In =

Single by Garth Brooks with Trisha Yearwood

from the album Scarecrow
- Released: February 2, 2002
- Studio: Jack's Tracks (Nashville, Tennessee)
- Genre: Country
- Length: 3:31
- Label: Capitol Nashville
- Songwriters: Delbert McClinton, Gary Nicholson
- Producer: Allen Reynolds

Garth Brooks singles chronology
"Wrapped Up in You" (2001)	"Squeeze Me In" (2002)	"Thicker Than Blood" (2002)

Trisha Yearwood singles chronology
"Inside Out" (2001)	"Squeeze Me In" (2002)	"I Don't Paint Myself into Corners" (2002)

"Squeeze Me In" is a song written by Delbert McClinton and Gary Nicholson. It was recorded by Lee Roy Parnell for his 1995 album We All Get Lucky Sometimes, and was the B-side to his 1996 single "Givin' Water to a Drowning Man".

It was recorded by American country music artists Garth Brooks and Trisha Yearwood. It was released in February 2002 as the second single from Brooks' album Scarecrow. The song reached number 16 on the Billboard Hot Country Singles & Tracks chart.

Brooks and Yearwood's version was nominated at the Grammy Awards for Best Country Collaboration with Vocals.

== Music video ==
The music video was directed by Jon Small and premiered in early 2002. It is a live performance video.

== Chart performance ==
Chart (2002)	Peak position
US Hot Country Songs (Billboard)	16
US Bubbling Under Hot 100 (Billboard)	2
