= She's Every Woman =

Single by Garth Brooks

from the album Fresh Horses
- B-side: "The Cowboy Song"
- Released: August 28, 1995
- Studio: Jack's Tracks (Nashville, Tennessee)
- Genre: Country
- Length: 2:52
- Label: Capitol Nashville
- Songwriters: Victoria Shaw, Garth Brooks
- Producer: Allen Reynolds

Garth Brooks singles chronology
"The Red Strokes" (1994)	"She's Every Woman" (1995)	"The Fever" (1995)

"She's Every Woman" is a song written by Victoria Shaw and Garth Brooks, and recorded by Brooks. It was released in August 1995 as the first single from the album Fresh Horses. It was a Number One hit on the Billboard Hot Country Singles & Tracks charts in October 1995, becoming his 14th Number One on that chart.

== Content ==
Brooks wrote the song with Victoria Shaw, with whom he had also written a previous Number One hit, 1992's "The River". The song, like "The River", had sat unrecorded for several years before it was recorded.

== Releases ==
7" Jukebox single Liberty 18842, 1996

1. "She's Every Woman" - 2:53
2. "The Cowboy Song"

European CD Single Capitol CDCL767, 1996

1. "She's Every Woman"
2. "The Red Strokes"
3. "Unto You This Night"

The Netherlands CD Single Liberty 724388260626, 1995

1. "She's Every Woman" - 2:53
2. "The Red Strokes" - 3:44
3. "The Dance" - 3:37

The Netherlands promotional CD Capitol cdsp 121, 1996

1. "She's Every Woman"

== Chart history ==
"She's Every Woman" debuted at number 38 on the Billboard Hot Country Singles & Tracks charts on the chart week of September 9, 1995, climbing to number 10 the next week. It reached its peak of number 1 on the chart week of October 21, its seventh week on the charts.

On the RPM Country Tracks charts in Canada, "She's Every Woman" debuted at number 76 for the week of September 4, 1995. It was also a Number One on this chart, holding the position for two non-consecutive weeks. The first of these two weeks was October 16, 1995. One week later, the song fell to number two, with Shania Twain's "The Woman in Me (Needs the Man in You)" taking over the number 1 spot. On the 30th, "She's Every Woman" fell to number four, also holding the number four position on the November 6th charts and moving up to number three on the 13th. Finally, by the 20th, "She's Every Woman" returned to number 1, with three other Number One songs in between its two weeks at the top: Twain's song on the 23rd and 30th, BlackHawk's "I'm Not Strong Enough to Say No" on the 6th, and Jason McCoy's "Learning a Lot About Love" on the 13th.

=== Chart positions ===
Chart (1995)	Peak position
Australia (ARIA)	148
Canada Country Singles (RPM)	1
Scottish Singles Chart	58
UK Singles Chart	55
US Hot Country Songs (Billboard)	1

=== Year-end charts ===
Chart (1995)	Position
Canada Country Tracks (RPM)	2
US Country Songs (Billboard)	59
