= The Change (song) =

Single by Garth Brooks

from the album Fresh Horses
- Released: March 30, 1996
- Studio: Jack's Tracks (Nashville, Tennessee)
- Genre: Country
- Length: 4:06
- Label: Capitol Nashville
- Songwriters: Tony Arata; Wayne Tester
- Producer: Allen Reynolds

Garth Brooks singles chronology
"The Beaches of Cheyenne" (1995)	"The Change" (1996)	"It's Midnight Cinderella" (1996)

"The Change" is a song written by Tony Arata and Wayne Tester, and recorded by American country music artist Garth Brooks. It was released in March 1996 as the fourth single from the album Fresh Horses. The song reached number 19 on the Billboard Hot Country Singles & Tracks chart.

== Content ==
The song describes someone making an effort to fix the world, even though people keep telling them that they'll "never change things", and that their effort will not make the world a significantly better place. He describes his action as being "like trying to stop a fire with the moisture from a kiss". Ultimately, the singer concludes that even if he fails to change the world, the world "will not change me".

== Music video ==
The music video was directed by Jon Small, edited by Scott Mele, and premiered in February 1996. The song pays respect to the families of victims of the Oklahoma City bombing. The video shows Brooks dressed in dark clothing and singing, while he is surrounded by large screens showing news footage and photographic images from the incident.

== Chart performance ==
"The Change" re-entered the U.S. Billboard Hot Country Singles & Tracks at number 71 as an official single for the week of March 30, 1996.

Chart (1996)	Peak position
Canada Country Tracks (RPM)	8
US Hot Country Songs (Billboard)	19
US Country Top 50 (Radio and Records)	16

=== Year-end charts ===
Chart (1996)	Position
Canada Country Tracks (RPM)	92
