= Good Ride Cowboy =

Single by Garth Brooks

from the album The Lost Sessions
- Released: October 24, 2005
- Recorded: 2005
- Genre: Country
- Length: 3:26
- Label: Pearl; Lyric Street
- Songwriters: Jerrod Niemann; Richie Brown; Bryan Kennedy; Bob Doyle
- Producer: Allen Reynolds

Garth Brooks singles chronology
"Why Ain't I Running" (2002)	"Good Ride Cowboy" (2005)	"Love Will Always Win" (2006)

"Good Ride Cowboy" is a song written by Jerrod Niemann, Bryan Kennedy, Richie Brown and Bob Doyle, and recorded by American country music artist Garth Brooks. It was released in October 2005 as the first single from his tenth studio album The Lost Sessions. The song is a tribute to Brooks' friend Chris LeDoux, champion rodeo bareback rider and country musician. Released in late 2005 as a single, the song went on to peak at number three on the Billboard Hot Country Songs charts.

== Content ==
Brooks briefly emerged from retirement in late 2005 to record the upbeat "Good Ride Cowboy", shortly after the death of singer Chris LeDoux. Brooks first performed the song at the CMA awards show, while the CMA Chairman's Award of Merit was presented in LeDoux's honor.

In an interview conducted with CMT, Brooks stated, "I knew if I ever recorded any kind of tribute to Chris, it would have to be up-tempo, happy ... a song like him ... not some slow, mournful song. He wasn't like that. Chris was exactly what our heroes are supposed to be. He was a man's man. A good friend".

== Chart positions ==
"Good Ride Cowboy" debuted at number 18 on the U.S. Billboard Hot Country Singles & Tracks chart for the week of October 22, 2005. The song set a record at the time for the highest debuting single on the country charts since the inception of SoundScan in 1990. Keith Urban later broke the record with his 2006 single "Once in a Lifetime," and Kenny Chesney broke it again with 2007's "Don't Blink;" Brooks reclaimed the record one week after Chesney did, when "More Than a Memory" debuted at number one.

Chart (2005–2006)	Peak position
AirCheck Mediabase	1
US Hot Country Songs (Billboard)	3
US Billboard Hot 100	59

=== Year-end charts ===
Chart (2006)	Position
US Country Songs (Billboard)	47
