= The Beaches of Cheyenne =

Single by Garth Brooks

from the album Fresh Horses
- B-side: "Ireland"
- Released: December 11, 1995
- Studio: Jack's Tracks (Nashville, Tennessee)
- Genre: Country
- Length: 4:13
- Label: Capitol Nashville 19022
- Songwriters: Dan Roberts; Bryan Kennedy; Garth Brooks
- Producer: Allen Reynolds

Garth Brooks singles chronology
"The Fever" (1995)	"The Beaches of Cheyenne" (1995)	"The Change" (1996)

"The Beaches of Cheyenne" is a song co-written and recorded by American country music singer Garth Brooks. It was released in December 1995 as the third single from his sixth studio album Fresh Horses. The song became Brooks's 15th Billboard Number One hit in March 1996. The song was written by Brooks, Dan Roberts and Bryan Kennedy.

== Background and writing ==
On the 1995 TV special, The Garth Brooks Story, Garth explains that the song's meaning did not end up the way he planned: "[It was] supposed to be real funny. Kind of like cowboys on the beach, kind of, swingin' kind of thing. Then it went to a guy on the beach that would come home from a suit and tie job. He never had any cowboy talents, but he always wanted to be one. So he just comes home, slips off his shoes and goes out and walks on the beach and dreams of Wyoming and stuff. Then out of just a fluke, one time passing through, it came with...every night she walks the beaches of Cheyenne. We looked at each other and said, "This ain't gonna be funny, boys." Cheyenne, Wyoming, is home to Cheyenne Frontier Days, one of the most notable rodeo events that takes place every summer.

== Content ==
"The Beaches of Cheyenne" is a mid-tempo set in the key of G major. Brooks's vocals range from C4 (middle C) to E5.

The lyrics describe a woman who "just went crazy" after her husband decides to participate in a rodeo against her wishes in Cheyenne, Wyoming, and is killed in the bull riding event after he "drew a bull no man could ride". The grieving woman, distraught that her last words to her husband were "I don't give a damn if you never come back from Cheyenne", ran out into the ocean. Although her body was never found (it's suggested she may even still be alive), the narrator explains that "If you go down by the water / You'll see her footprints in the sand / 'Cause every night she walks the beaches of Cheyenne."

== Track listing ==
European EP single

1. "The Beaches of Cheyenne"
2. "Standing Outside The Fire"
3. "If Tomorrow Never Comes"

U.S. DJ promo CD single Capitol D-Pro-10332, 1996

1. "The Beaches of Cheyenne" - 4:11

U.S. 7" jukebox single Capitol Nashville 19022, 1996

1. "The Beaches of Cheyenne" - 4:13
2. "Ireland"

== Critical reception ==
Stephen Thomas Erlewine of Allmusic considered "The Beaches of Cheyenne" one of the stronger tracks on the album, saying that Brooks "let his guard down" because, unlike the rest of the album, he was not "trying too hard." Entertainment Weekly critic Alanna Nash called it a "confusing ghost story."

== Chart history ==
The song debuted on the Billboard country charts on the week of December 9, 1995, along with four album cuts from Fresh Horses: "The Old Stuff", "Rollin'", "It's Midnight Cinderella" and "That Ol' Wind", of which the latter two were later released as singles. On the chart week of March 16, 1996, it became Brooks's fifteenth Billboard Number One hit, holding the position for one week.

=== Chart positions ===
Chart (1995–1996)	Peak position
Canada Country Singles (RPM)	1
US Hot Country Songs (Billboard)	1

=== Year-end charts ===
Chart (1996)	Position
Canada Country Tracks (RPM)	65
US Country Songs (Billboard)	38
