= Wrapped Up in You =

Single by Garth Brooks

from the album Scarecrow
- Released: October 15, 2001
- Studio: Jack's Tracks (Nashville, Tennessee)
- Genre: Country
- Length: 4:42 (album version); 2:35 (radio edit)
- Label: Capitol Nashville
- Songwriter: Wayne Kirkpatrick
- Producer: Allen Reynolds

Garth Brooks singles chronology
"Beer Run (B Double E Double Are You In?)" (2001)	"Wrapped Up in You" (2001)	"Squeeze Me In" (2002)

"Wrapped Up in You" is a song written by Wayne Kirkpatrick and recorded by American country music artist Garth Brooks. It was released in October 2001 as the second single from his eighth studio album Scarecrow. It reached number 5 on the Billboard Country Charts in 2002 and number 46 on the Billboard Hot 100.

== Content ==
"Wrapped Up In You" is a love song. A man expresses his love for a special someone using various analogies and describing how she supports him in hard times and how his life would be if she weren't around. The song doesn't feature any drums, but does have traces of percussion such as maracas. It is in the key G Major.

== Music video ==
The song's music video opens with a quartet of old men at a barbershop executing unique and moderately complex percussions, using household objects such as a broom, board game piece, newspaper etc. while Garth and back-up band arrive for a bite to eat. Garth and co. can't get in the restaurant but notice the old men's performance. They pick-up some instruments lying about and join them to perform the song. A small group of women appear near the end of the song and observe the men's performance. This video was directed by Jon Small, and was shot in Watertown, Tennessee, which was also used for the Dr Pepper commercial during the "BE YOU" campaign.

== Chart positions ==
"Wrapped Up in You" debuted at number 22 on the U.S. Billboard Hot Country Singles & Tracks for the chart week of October 27, 2001.

Chart (2001–2002)	Peak position
US Hot Country Songs (Billboard)	5
US Billboard Hot 100	46

=== Year-end charts ===
Chart (2002)	Position
US Country Songs (Billboard)	43

== Personnel ==
Compiled from liner notes.

- Sam Bacco — drums, percussion
- Garth Brooks — vocals
- Gordon Kennedy, Wayne Kirkpatrick — acoustic guitars
- Jimmy Mattingly — fiddle
- Terry McMillan — harmonica
- Jimmie Lee Sloas — bass guitar
