= GhostTunes =

Former online music store and digital library

- Screenshot GhostTunes homepage in 2016
- Website type: Private
- Founded: September 4, 2014; 12 years ago
- Headquarters: Nashville, Tennessee
- Country of origin: United States
- Founder: Garth Brooks
- CEO: Randy Bernard
- Key people: Chris Webb, Kevin Stone, Gregory Jordan
- Industry: Music
- Services: Online music store Digital library
- Website: www.ghosttunes.com
- Registration: Required
- Current status: Absorbed into Amazon Music, March 3, 2017
- Native clients on: iOS; Android

GhostTunes was an online music store and digital library founded by American country music singer Garth Brooks, Randy Bernard, and Chris Webb. It launched in September 2014 and featured singles and albums from a variety of artists, including Brooks' entire catalogue. GhostTunes varied from other online music stores such as the iTunes Store by allowing the individual record labels to choose their selling format, such as entire albums or singles (all 320 kbit/s MP3s), as well as prices, with an emphasis on fair and proper royalty payments. Its digital library could be synced across multiple devices, creating a multi-platform collection encompassing all user-downloaded music, regardless of the store used to purchase.

On March 3, 2017, GhostTunes was absorbed into Amazon Music.

== History ==
Following widely covered disagreements with music streaming, Garth Brooks founded GhostTunes in 2014 to coincide with his return to live performing and album releases. Its beta version launched on September 4, 2014, with the full version rolling out two months later.

While GhostTunes' original purpose was to exclusively showcase Brooks' music, Brooks made a push to allow many other artists to sell their music in the online store, allowing it to evolve into an e-commerce site containing more than 10 million songs available for purchase. Fittingly, the first albums available for purchase through the music service were Brooks' entire catalogue, available digitally for the first time, along with the exclusive release of his album, Man Against Machine. GhostTunes remained the only online means by which to purchase Brooks' albums until his 2016 partnership with Amazon. The service's name, "GhostTunes", was derived from founder Brooks' first name, Garth, and his "hosting" of the site ("G-host").

Brooks announced on October 19, 2016, in an interview with Billboard, that he was moving his music to the "Music Unlimited" streaming service from Amazon Music, stating that he was unsure what the future held for GhostTunes. On March 3, 2017, GhostTunes ceased operations and began to redirect to Amazon Music.

== Clients ==
=== Desktop ===
GhostTunes featured an online music store and library. The library consisted of all songs and albums purchased via the GhostTunes store, available for listening immediately after download within the application. Purchased and downloaded music could also be synced directly with a user's iTunes, creating a cross-platform library.

=== Mobile ===
Garth Brooks' catalogue shown on GhostTunes for iOS

GhostTunes was available via iOS and Android on mobile devices. The GhostTunes application allowed for music purchases to be made within the Android application, and downloading songs and albums directly to the device. It also syncs with the user's local music library, combining internal downloads with GhostTunes purchases for offline listening.

== Royalties and pricing ==
Royalty payments has been a pressing issue in Brooks' career, and GhostTunes reflected these concerns. When announcing the service, Brooks remarked, "This is a site that treats music with the utmost respect, where our job everyday is to offer music the way the artists want to share it to the listeners who live for and love it." GhostTunes allowed individual record labels the freedom to sell music without financial restrictions. Additionally Brooks, a long-time supporter of album sales (as opposed to singles), cited the ability of record labels to distribute with the flexibility of selling both singles and albums, or only albums.

The music service had a distribution deal with many content owners, including Universal Music Group, Warner Music Group, Sony Music Entertainment, The Orchard, all of which pay 80 percent revenue back to artists and writers (as opposed to the traditional 70 percent). Freedom in pricing allowed for some albums to be sold at lower price on GhostTunes. For example, Sam Hunt's Montevallo sold for $6.99 (less than its standard iTunes price of $9.99). Nonetheless, while such autonomy promotes lower prices in some cases, the majority remains the same across all selling platforms.

== Critical reception ==
Harley Brown of Billboard praised the service, noting its resembling "a cross between Spotify and eMusic". Jonathan Robles of Variance Magazine called GhostTunes "a win-win" for Brooks, praising the selling of full digital albums in an era of which singles take priority. R-tools Technology's John Cook said GhostTunes "is worth a look", calling it "one way to get your music a bit differently" than the competitors.

On the contrary, Zack O'Malley Greenburg of Forbes disagreed with the GhostTunes' lack of streaming, as well as Brooks' restricting his entire catalogue to the service, stating, "streaming is the future of the music industry". Glenn Peoples of Billboard remarked "consumer behavior" impacted a lack of interest in GhostTunes, citing the average person's objective to purchase music through a major, more familiar retailer (such as iTunes or Amazon). Despite many critical comparisons between GhostTunes and other online music stores, CEO Randy Bernard maintained the stance that GhostTunes was to serve as an alternative, not a direct competitor.

== See also ==
- Comparison of online music stores
