= Scarecrow (Garth Brooks album) =

Studio album by Garth Brooks
- Released: November 13, 2001
- Recorded: October 2000–2001
- Studio: Jack's Tracks Recording Studio
- Genre: Country
- Length: 48:27
- Label: Capitol Nashville
- Producer: Allen Reynolds

Garth Brooks chronology
Songs from Call Me Claus (2001)	Scarecrow (2001)	The Limited Series (2005)

Alternative cover

Singles from Scarecrow
- 1. "Wrapped Up in You" Released: October 15, 2001; 2. "Squeeze Me In" Released: February 2, 2002; 3. "Thicker Than Blood" Released: May 29, 2002; 4. "Why Ain't I Running" Released: March 8, 2003

Professional ratings
Aggregate scores
Source	Rating
Metacritic	(77/100)
Review scores
Source	Rating
AllMusic	4/5 stars
BBC Music	(favorable)
Billboard	(favorable)
E! Online	B
Entertainment Weekly	B
Plugged In (publication)	(mixed)
Q	4/5 stars
Robert Christgau	(1-star Honorable Mention)
Rolling Stone	4/5 stars
The Village Voice	(mixed)

Scarecrow is the eighth studio album by American country music artist Garth Brooks. It was released on November 13, 2001, and debuted at #1 on the Billboard 200 chart, and the Top Country Albums chart. It has been certified 5× platinum RIAA and was named Best Selling Album at the 2002 Canadian Country Music Association Awards.

The album was re-released in 2016 with two extra songs: "More Than a Memory" which was a number one country hit in 2007, and "Good Ride Cowboy" (2005), a tribute to singer–rodeo star Chris LeDoux.

== Background ==
Brooks commented on the album saying:

At the end of last year I made a commitment to Capitol (Records) that I would try to bring them one more album. This is the result of that effort, a real labor of love, that I'm proud to hold up next to all of our previous releases. For the first time in my life I think I made a happy album. It's heavy on steel guitars, but you're not aware of it in some places because the musicians are so good at what they do.

== Content ==
Singles released from this album include "Beer Run (B Double E Double Are You In?)" (a duet with George Jones, also found on Jones's 2001 album The Rock: Stone Cold Country 2001), "Wrapped Up in You", "Squeeze Me In" (a duet with Trisha Yearwood), "Thicker Than Blood", and "Why Ain't I Running". Of these, "Wrapped Up in You" was the highest peaking, reaching #5 on the Hot Country Songs charts. Prior to the album's release, "When You Come Back to Me Again" had charted on the country charts as a selection from the soundtrack to the film Frequency.

Several of the tracks on this album were originally recorded by other artists. "Pushing Up Daisies" was originally recorded by Kevin Welch on his 1995 album Life Down Here on Earth, while "Big Money" was originally recorded under the title "It Pays Big Money" by Mark Chesnutt on his 2000 album Lost in the Feeling. Additionally, "Don't Cross the River" was previously recorded by America on their 1972 album Homecoming. "Squeeze Me In" was previously recorded by Lee Roy Parnell on his 1995 album We All Get Lucky Sometimes.

== Track listing ==
No.	Title	Writer(s)	Length
1.	"Why Ain't I Running"	Tony Arata; Kent Blazy; Garth Brooks	4:33
2.	"Beer Run (B-Double E-Double Are You In?)" (duet with George Jones)	Keith Anderson; Blazy; George Ducas; Kim Williams; Amanda Williams	2:30
3.	"Wrapped Up in You"	Wayne Kirkpatrick	4:43
4.	"The Storm"	Blazy; Brooks; Williams	4:37
5.	"Thicker Than Blood"	Brooks; Jenny Yates	2:53
6.	"Big Money"	Shawn Camp; Randy Hardison; Wynn Varble	4:01
7.	"Squeeze Me In" (duet with Trisha Yearwood)	Delbert McClinton; Gary Nicholson	3:32
8.	"Mr. Midnight"	Buddy Buie; J. R. Cobb; Tom Douglas	4:03
9.	"Pushing Up Daisies"	John Hadley; Gary Scruggs; Kevin Welch	4:19
10.	"Rodeo or Mexico"	Brooks; Bryan Kennedy; Paul Kennerley	4:23
11.	"Don't Cross the River"	Dan Peek	4:09
12.	"When You Come Back to Me Again (Theme from the movie Frequency)"	Brooks; Yates	4:44
Total length:			48:27

== Personnel ==
Compiled from liner notes.

=== Musicians ===
- Sam Bacco – percussion (1, 3, 7, 10), drums (1), tambourine (9)
- Bruce Bouton – pedal steel guitar (except 1, 10), slide guitar (8)
- Garth Brooks – lead vocals, backing vocals (except 2, 5, 9)
- Dennis Burnside – string arrangements (3, 6, 12)
- Sam Bush – mandolin (10)
- Mark Casstevens – acoustic guitar (except 1, 10)
- Mike Chapman – bass guitar (except 1)
- Jerry Douglas – resonator guitar (10)
- Béla Fleck – banjo (10)
- Pat Flynn – acoustic guitar (10)
- Rob Hajacos – fiddle (2, 3, 5, 11)
- George Jones – duet vocals (2)
- Gordon Kennedy – acoustic guitar (1)
- Wayne Kirkpatrick – acoustic guitar (1)
- Chris Leuzinger – electric guitar (except 1, 10)
- Jimmy Mattingly – fiddle (1, 10)
- Terry McMillan – harmonica (1)
- Joey Miskulin – accordion (2, 11)
- Milton Sledge – drums (except 1), percussion (7)
- Jimmie Lee Sloas – bass guitar (1)
- Bobby Wood – keyboards (except 1, 10)
- Trisha Yearwood – backing vocals (1, 4, 5, 9, 11, 12), duet vocals (9)

Strings (track 12)

- David Angell – violin
- John Catchings – cello
- David Davidson – violin
- Conni Ellisor – violin
- Carl Gorodetzky – violin
- James Grosjean – viola
- Jack Jezioro – cello
- Lee Larrison – violin
- Robert Mason – cello
- Cate Myer – violin
- Carole Rabinowitz – cello
- Pamela Sixfin – violin
- Elizabeth Stewart – violin
- Alan Umstead – violin
- Catherine Umstead – violin
- Mary Vanosdale – violin
- Gary Vanosdale – viola
- Kristin Wilkinson – violin
- Karen Winkelmann – violin

=== Production ===
- Eric Conn – digital editing
- Duke Duczer – recording assistant
- Carlos Grier – digital editing
- John Kelton – engineer
- Mark Miller – recording engineer, mixing engineer
- Denny Purcell – mastering engineer
- Allen Reynolds – producer
- Keith Stegall – recording engineer

== Charts ==
In the United States, Scarecrow debuted at No. 1 on the Billboard 200, becoming his eighth No. 1 album on the chart, and No. 1 on the Top Country Albums, becoming his eleventh No. 1 Country album. In January 2006, Scarecrow was certified 5× Platinum by the RIAA.

=== Weekly charts ===
Chart (2001)	Peak position
Australian Albums Chart	71
Canadian Albums Chart	4
German Albums Chart	58
Irish Albums Chart	6
Norwegian Albums Chart	32
Scottish Albums Chart	80
Swiss Albums Chart	77
UK Albums Chart	82
U.S. Billboard 200	1
U.S. Billboard Top Country Albums	1

=== Year-end charts ===
2001 year-end chart performance for Scarecrow by Garth Brooks
Chart (2001)	Position
Canadian Albums (Nielsen SoundScan)	56
Canadian Country Albums (Nielsen SoundScan)	3
Worldwide Albums (IFPI)	19

2002 year-end chart performance for Scarecrow by Garth Brooks
Chart (2002)	Position
Canadian Country Albums (Nielsen SoundScan)	19

== Certifications ==
Region	Certification	Certified units/sales
Canada (Music Canada)	Platinum	100,000^{^}
United States (RIAA)	5× Platinum	5,000,000^{^}
^{^} Shipments figures based on certification alone.
