= Fresh Horses (album) =

Studio album by Garth Brooks
- Released: November 21, 1995
- Studio: Jack's Tracks (Nashville, Tennessee)
- Genre: Country
- Length: 38:13
- Label: Capitol Nashville
- Producer: Allen Reynolds

Garth Brooks chronology
The Hits (1994)	Fresh Horses (1995)	Sevens (1997)

Singles from Fresh Horses
- 1. "She's Every Woman" Released: August 28, 1995; 2. "The Fever" Released: November 20, 1995; 3. "The Beaches of Cheyenne" Released: December 11, 1995; 4. "The Change" Released: February 28, 1996; 5. "It's Midnight Cinderella" Released: June 10, 1996; 6. "That Ol' Wind" Released: September 30, 1996

Professional ratings
Review scores
Source	Rating
AllMusic	2.5/5 stars
Christgau's Consumer Guide	B+
Entertainment Weekly	B−
The Rolling Stone Album Guide	2/5 stars
Spin	8/10

Fresh Horses is the sixth studio album by American country music artist Garth Brooks. It was released on November 21, 1995. Fresh Horses peaked at number two on the Billboard 200 chart, and number one on the Top Country Albums chart.

The album had a worldwide radio ban until it was available to buy. Only the two singles issued ("She's Every Woman" and "The Fever") were allowed to be played before this date, the latter of which was a new country-rock version of a 1993 Aerosmith song. In 2020 it was certified 8× Platinum by the RIAA, signifying 8 million copies shipped in the US, making it his only non-Christmas pre-Chris Gaines studio album to not be certified diamond or higher.

== Background ==
Brooks commented on the album, saying:

"Everyone was expecting this album to be pop. Everyone said we were leaving (country). For the first time ever, I was involved (in writing) in eight of the 10 cuts, so it's a huge reflection of myself. It's the things I enjoy singing about. I got to sing about the band on the road, I got to sing about cowboys, and more importantly, the women who put up with those cowboys."

== Track listing ==
No.	Title	Writer(s)	Length
1.	"The Old Stuff"	Garth Brooks; Bryan Kennedy; Dan Roberts	4:11
2.	"Cowboys and Angels"	Kent Blazy; Brooks; Kim Williams	3:17
3.	"The Fever"	Kennedy; Joe Perry; Roberts; Steven Tyler	2:39
4.	"That Ol' Wind"	Brooks; Leigh Reynolds	5:20
5.	"Rollin'"	Harley Allen; Brooks; Reynolds	4:02
6.	"The Change"	Tony Arata; Wayne Tester	4:07
7.	"The Beaches of Cheyenne"	Brooks; Kennedy; Roberts	4:13
8.	"It's Midnight Cinderella"	Blazy; Brooks; Williams	2:23
9.	"She's Every Woman"	Brooks; Victoria Shaw	2:55
10.	"Ireland"	Brooks; Stephanie Davis; Jenny Yates	4:56
Total length:			38:13

Notes

- The Limited Series (1998) version of the album inserted a cover of Bob Dylan's "To Make You Feel My Love" between tracks 7 and 8. This cover was originally part of the soundtrack to Hope Floats.

== Personnel ==
- Susan Ashton – backing vocals on "She's Every Woman"
- Sam Bacco – percussion on "She's Every Woman"
- Bruce Bouton – pedal steel guitar except "The Fever"
- Garth Brooks – lead and backing vocals
- Mark Casstevens – acoustic guitar except "The Fever"
- Charles Cochran – string arrangements on "That Ol' Wind" and "The Change"
- Mike Chapman – bass guitar
- Ed Foote – hurdy-gurdy on "Ireland"
- Rob Hajacos – fiddle except "The Change" and "She's Every Woman"
- Gordon Kennedy – electric guitar on "The Old Stuff" and "The Fever"
- Chris Leuzinger – electric guitar
- Milton Sledge – drums; percussion on "The Fever" and "Ireland"
- Bobby Wood – keyboards except "The Fever"
- Trisha Yearwood – backing vocals on "The Old Stuff", "Cowboys and Angels", "Rollin'", "The Beaches of Cheyenne" and "It's Midnight Cinderella"
- Nashville String Machine – string orchestra on "That Ol' Wind" and "The Change"

== Charts ==
Fresh Horses peaked at number two on the US Billboard 200, and number one on the Top Country Albums, becoming his sixth Country number-one album. Fresh Horses has been certified 8× Platinum by the RIAA.

=== Weekly charts ===
Chart (1995–97)	Peak position
Australian Albums (ARIA)	5
Canadian Albums (RPM)	7
Canadian Country Albums (RPM)	1
Dutch Albums (Album Top 100)	53
European Albums (Billboard)	24
German Albums (Offizielle Top 100)	55
Irish Albums (IRMA)	1
Norwegian Albums (VG-lista)	10
Scottish Albums (OCC)	32
Swiss Albums (Schweizer Hitparade)	35
UK Albums (OCC)	22
US Billboard 200	2
US Top Country Albums (Billboard)	1
Zimbabwean Albums Chart	19

=== Year-end charts ===
1995 year-end chart performance for Fresh Horses
Chart (1995)	Position
Australian Albums (ARIA)	83

Chart (1996)	Position
US Billboard 200	7
US Top Country Albums (Billboard)	2

Chart (1997)	Position
US Top Country Albums (Billboard)	29

== Certifications ==
Region	Certification	Certified units/sales
Australia (ARIA)	Gold	35,000^{^}
Canada (Music Canada)	5× Platinum	500,000^{^}
United Kingdom (BPI)	Gold	100,000^{^}
United States (RIAA)	8× Platinum	8,000,000^{‡}
^{^} Shipments figures based on certification alone.^{‡} Sales+streaming figures based on certification alone.
