= Fever (Aerosmith song) =

Song by Aerosmith

Promotional single by Aerosmith

from the album Get a Grip
- Released: August 30, 1993
- Recorded: 1992
- Genre: Hard rock
- Length: 4:15
- Label: Geffen
- Songwriters: Steven Tyler; Joe Perry
- Producer: Bruce Fairbairn

Aerosmith singles chronology
| "Eat the Rich" (1993) | "Fever" (1993) | "Cryin'" (1993) |

"Fever" is a song by American rock band Aerosmith. It is from the band's massively successful 1993 album Get a Grip. It was written by Steven Tyler and Joe Perry and is the only Tyler/Perry song on Get a Grip written without the aid of "song doctors". The song is the fourth track on Get a Grip, running four minutes and 15 seconds. The song reached #5 on the Billboard Mainstream Rock Tracks chart and is one of seven tracks from Get a Grip to make a chart appearance on any chart.

== Content ==
The song seems to be about having a good time, and how the band members, especially Steven Tyler, have abandoned drugs in favor of sex and other enjoyable things in life, with lyrics such as "the buzz that you be gettin' from the crack don't last, I'd rather be OD'in on the crack of her ass."

The song features heavy guitar interplay by Joe Perry and Brad Whitford, a fast-paced drum beat and bass rhythm by Joey Kramer and Tom Hamilton, and loud and varied singing and harmonica playing by Tyler. The guitar solo is played by Whitford.

== Personnel ==
- Steven Tyler – lead vocals, blues harp
- Brad Whitford – lead guitar
- Joe Perry – rhythm guitar
- Tom Hamilton – bass guitar
- Joey Kramer – drums

== Chart positions (Aerosmith version) ==
"Fever" debuted at #25 on the U.S. Billboard Album Rock Tracks for the week of September 4, 1993

| Chart (1995) | Peak position |
|---|---|
| U.S. Billboard Album Rock Tracks | 5 |

== Garth Brooks version ==
"The Fever"

Single by Garth Brooks

from the album Fresh Horses
- B-side: "The Night Will Only Know"
- Released: November 20, 1995
- Recorded: 1995
- Studio: Jack's Tracks (Nashville, Tennessee)
- Genre: Country; country rock
- Length: 2:40
- Label: Capitol Nashville 18948
- Songwriters: Steven Tyler; Joe Perry; Dan Roberts; Bryan Kennedy
- Producer: Allen Reynolds

Garth Brooks singles chronology
| "She's Every Woman" (1995) | "The Fever" (1995) | "The Beaches of Cheyenne" (1995) |

Country music artist Garth Brooks covered the song in 1995, retitled as "The Fever".

=== Content ===
Brooks's country rock-generated version featured altered lyrics written by Dan Roberts and Bryan Kennedy which replace the references to drug use and promiscuity with those describing a bull rider addicted to his profession instead (e.g., "He's got a split finger wrap and his rope's pulled way too tight / He's got a lunatic smile 'cause he's really drawn deep tonight."). As a result of the lyrical changes, Roberts and Kennedy are credited alongside Tyler and Perry as songwriters on Brooks's version.

The cover was included on his album Fresh Horses. That album's second single, it peaked #23 on the U.S. Billboard Hot Country Singles & Tracks (now Hot Country Songs) chart and #2 on the RPM Top Country Tracks charts in Canada. Brooks also included the song in his live shows and it appeared on his 1998 album Double Live.

=== Personnel ===
- Garth Brooks – lead and backing vocals
- Mike Chapman – bass guitar
- Rob Hajacos – fiddle
- Gordon Kennedy – electric guitar
- Chris Leuzinger – electric guitar
- Milton Sledge – drums and percussion

=== Chart positions ===
"The Fever" debuted at number 27 on the U.S. Billboard Hot Country Singles & Tracks for the week of November 25, 1995.

| Chart (1995) | Peak position |
|---|---|
| Canada Country Singles (RPM) | 2 |
| US Hot Country Songs (Billboard) | 23 |

=== Year-end charts ===
| Chart (1996) | Position |
|---|---|
| Canada Country Tracks (RPM) | 94 |

== Other versions ==
Garth Brooks' adaptation of the song was also recorded by American country music artist Chris LeDoux on his 1998 album One Road Man.
