= Chris Gaines =

Persona of Garth Brooks

- Born: Christian Gene Gaines; August 10, 1967; Brisbane, Queensland, Australia
- Origin: Greater Los Angeles, California, US (fictional); Nashville, Tennessee, US (actual)
- Genres: Rock; alternative rock; pop rock
- Years active: 1985–1999 (fictional); 1999 (actual)
- Label: Capitol
- Spinoff of: Garth Brooks

Chris Gaines is a short-lived fictional rock persona created as a movie character for Garth Brooks to explore musical styles different from his success as a country singer.

Initially, Brooks planned to feature the Gaines persona in The Lamb, a motion picture that never materialized. In 1999, Brooks released Garth Brooks in... the Life of Chris Gaines, his only album as Gaines. The album produced two charting US Billboard Hot 100 singles, including the top 5 pop hit "Lost in You".

== History ==
In 1999, Brooks and his production company Red Strokes Entertainment, with Paramount Pictures, began to develop a film in which Brooks would star. The Lamb was to have revolved around Chris Gaines, a fictional rock singer and his emotionally conflicted life as a musician in the public eye. To create buzz for the project, Brooks took on the identity of Gaines in the October 1999 album Garth Brooks in... the Life of Chris Gaines, which was intended as a "pre-soundtrack" to the film. The pop and rock styles were a departure from Brooks' usual material, and the album was intended to represent the "greatest hits" of Gaines' entire career, spanning several decades of supposed recordings. Although Brooks himself developed the Gaines character and backstory, he did not write any of the songs on the album.

To promote the album's release, Brooks appeared as Gaines in a television "mockumentary" for the VH1 series Behind the Music and as the musical guest on an episode of Saturday Night Live, which he hosted as himself.

The album – and Brooks' promotion of it – received a lukewarm reception. The album received mixed reviews, and Brooks' established fans responded with general confusion as to the purpose of the project. Although the album made it to No. 2 on the Billboard 200, expectations had been higher and retail stores began heavily discounting their oversupply. The disappointing sales and muted reaction brought the Gaines project to an indefinite hiatus in February 2001, and the Gaines character quickly faded into obscurity.

Despite the mediocre response to the project, Brooks gained his first and so far only hit on the Billboard Hot 100 Top 40 singles chart, with "Lost in You". Brooks had previously prevented his songs from appearing on the pop chart by refusing to release them to pop music radio stations.

Critic Stephen Thomas Erlewine of AllMusic speculated the alternate persona and elaborate marketing scheme backfired, writing: "When Brooks' new persona and his album were revealed to the public, they were unforgiving – they didn't think he was playing a role, they simply thought he'd lost his mind." However, Erlewine gave the album a 3-out-of-5 stars rating and in the same review later wrote: "Judged as Brooks' first pop album, it's pretty good, and if it had been released that way, it likely would have been embraced by a wide audience."

In March 2021, Brooks announced that The Life of Chris Gaines was to be rereleased on multiple platforms, including digital and vinyl, also saying previously unreleased songs were forthcoming.

== Discography ==
Fictional

- Crush (with Crush) (1985)
- Straight Jacket (1989)
- Fornucopia (1991)
- Apostle (1994)
- Triangle (1996)

=== Studio albums ===
Title	Details	Peak chart positions					Certifications (sales threshold)
Title	Details	US	CAN	CAN Country	GER	NOR	Certifications (sales threshold)
Garth Brooks in... the Life of Chris Gaines	Release date: September 28, 1999; Label: Capitol Records; Formats: CD, cassette	2	5	2	72	13	CAN: Platinum; US: 2× Platinum

=== Singles ===
Year	Single	Peak chart positions							Certifications (sales threshold)	Album
Year	Single	US	US AC	US Country	CAN	CAN AC	CAN Country	UK	Certifications (sales threshold)	Album
1999	"Lost in You"	5	9	62	2	1	55	70	US: Gold	In the Life of Chris Gaines
1999	"It Don't Matter to the Sun"	—^{[A]}	—	24	—	—	23	—		In the Life of Chris Gaines
1999	"Right Now"	—^{[B]}	—	—	—	—	—	—		In the Life of Chris Gaines
2000	"That's the Way I Remember It"	—	26	—	—	—	—	—		In the Life of Chris Gaines
"—" denotes releases that did not chart

Notes

- A "It Don't Matter to the Sun" did not enter the Billboard Hot 100 but peaked at number 13 on the Bubbling Under Hot 100 Singles chart.
- B "Right Now" did not enter the Billboard Hot 100 but peaked at number 50 on the Radio and Records Pop Chart (with "Lost In You" earlier reaching number 42 on that chart).

=== Music videos ===
Year	Title	Director
1999	"Lost in You"	Jon Small
1999	"Right Now"	Jon Small
