= Sevens (album) =

Studio album by Garth Brooks
- Released: November 25, 1997
- Studio: Jack's Tracks (Nashville, Tennessee)
- Genre: Country pop; country
- Length: 46:01
- Label: Capitol Nashville
- Producer: Allen Reynolds

Garth Brooks chronology
Fresh Horses (1995)	Sevens (1997)	The Limited Series (1998)

Singles from Sevens
- 1. "Longneck Bottle" Released: November 22, 1997; 2. "She's Gonna Make It" Released: January 15, 1998; 3. "Two Piña Coladas" Released: March 16, 1998; 4. "You Move Me" Released: August 24, 1998; 5. "Do What You Gotta Do" Released: January 3, 2000

Professional ratings
Review scores
Source	Rating
AllMusic	2.5/5 stars
Christgau's Consumer Guide	B
Entertainment Weekly	C+
Rolling Stone	3/5 stars

Sevens is the seventh studio album by American country music artist Garth Brooks. It was released on November 25, 1997, and debuted at No. 1 on the Billboard 200, and on the Top Country Albums chart. To date, it is Brooks' last studio album to be certified diamond by the RIAA. The album also topped the country albums chart in the United Kingdom for several months and crossed over into the mainstream pop chart there. His duet with Trisha Yearwood, "In Another's Eyes", won the Grammy Award for Best Country Collaboration with Vocals at the Grammy Awards of 1998. Sevens was nominated for the Best Country Album Grammy the following year.

== Background ==
Brooks commented on the album by saying:

"I'm proud, I'm excited, I'm nervous, and it feels good to be back in the game again. This is a very personal album. I only wrote six of the songs, but there are many that are so 'me' that people I work with every day thought I wrote them."

A music video was made for "I Don't Have to Wonder", even though it was not released as a single. It was directed by Jon Small and Garth Brooks.

== Track listing ==
No.	Title	Writer(s)	Length
1.	"Longneck Bottle"	Rick Carnes; Steve Wariner	2:17
2.	"How You Ever Gonna Know"	Kent Blazy; Garth Brooks	3:36
3.	"She's Gonna Make It"	Blazy; Brooks; Kim Williams	2:46
4.	"I Don't Have to Wonder"	Shawn Camp; Taylor Dunn	3:05
5.	"Two Piña Coladas"	Camp; Benita Hill; Sandy Mason	3:35
6.	"Cowboy Cadillac"	Brooks; Brian Kennedy	2:48
7.	"Fit for a King"	Carl Jackson; Jim Rushing	3:59
8.	"Do What You Gotta Do"	Pat Flynn	2:58
9.	"You Move Me"	Gordon Kennedy; Pierce Pettis	4:33
10.	"In Another's Eyes" (featuring Trisha Yearwood)	Brooks; John Peppard; Bobby Wood	3:34
11.	"When There's No One Around"	Tim O'Brien; Darrell Scott	3:33
12.	"A Friend to Me"	Brooks; Victoria Shaw	3:06
13.	"Take the Keys to My Heart"	Hill; Tommy Smith; Pam Wolfe	2:32
14.	"Belleau Wood"	Brooks; Joe Henry	3:28
Total length:			45:46

== Personnel ==
The following credits are sourced from liner notes.

- Susan Ashton – backing vocals on "She's Gonna Make It" and "You Move Me"
- Sam Bacco – percussion on "You Move Me" and "Belleau Wood"; congas on "She's Gonna Make It"
- Bruce Bouton – pedal steel guitar
- Garth Brooks – lead and backing vocals
- Sam Bush – backing vocals on "Do What You Gotta Do"; mandolin on "Do What You Gotta Do" and "When There's No One Around"
- Shawn Camp – acoustic guitar on "Two Piña Coladas"
- Mark Casstevens – acoustic guitar except "Fit For a King"
- Mike Chapman – bass guitar
- John Cowan – backing vocals on "Do What You Gotta Do"
- Béla Fleck – banjo on "Do What You Gotta Do"
- Pat Flynn – acoustic guitar on "Do What You Gotta Do"
- Kevin "Swine" Grantt – bass guitar on "Fit for a King"
- Rob Hajacos – fiddle
- Randy Hardison – drums on "Fit for a King"
- Lona Heid – backing vocals on "Fit for a King"
- Randy Howard – fiddle on "Fit for a King"
- Carl Jackson – acoustic guitar and backing vocals on "Fit for a King"
- Chris Leuzinger – electric guitar
- Edgar Meyer – double bass on "Belleau Wood"
- Jim Ed Norman – string arrangements and conductor on "In Another's Eyes" and "A Friend to Me"
- Al Perkins – resonator guitar on "Fit for a King"
- Allen Reynolds – backing vocals on "How You Ever Gonna Know"; producer
- Milton Sledge – drums except "Fit For a King"; percussion on "How You Ever Gonna Know", "When There's No One Around" and "Belleau Wood"
- Catherine Styron – piano on "Fit for a King"
- Steve Wariner – acoustic guitar on "Longneck Bottle"
- Bobby Wood – keyboards; piano on "Longneck Bottle"; electric piano on "Cowboy Cadillac"; backing vocals on "How You Ever Gonna Know"
- Trisha Yearwood – duet vocals on "In Another's Eyes"
- Nashville String Machine – string section on "In Another's Eyes" and "A Friend to Me"

Crowd vocals on "Two Piña Coladas": Dorothy "The Birthday Girl" Robinson, Charles Green, Mat Lindsey, Sandy Mason, Shawn Camp, Big Al, "Double D", Sam "The Man" Duczer, Garth Brooks

== Chart performance ==
Sevens debuted at number one on the US Billboard 200, becoming his fifth, and number one on the Top Country Albums, becoming his seventh Country number-one album. In November 2006, Sevens was certified 10× Platinum by the RIAA.

=== Weekly charts ===
Chart (1997)	Peak position
Australian Albums (ARIA)	20
Canadian Albums (RPM)	3
Canadian Country Albums (RPM)	1
Dutch Albums (Album Top 100)	80
European Albums Chart	33
German Albums (Offizielle Top 100)	41
Norwegian Albums (VG-lista)	8
Scottish Albums (Official Charts)	47
Spanish Albums (AFYVE)	40
Swiss Albums (Schweizer Hitparade)	38
UK Albums (Official Charts)	34
US Billboard 200	1
US Top Country Albums (Billboard)	1

=== Year-end charts ===
Chart (1998)	Position
US Billboard 200	3
US Top Country Albums (Billboard)	1

Chart (1999)	Position
US Top Country Albums (Billboard)	31

=== Decade-end charts ===
Chart (1990–1999)	Position
US Billboard 200	42

== Certifications ==
Region	Certification	Certified units/sales
Australia (ARIA)	Platinum	70,000^{^}
Canada (Music Canada)	5× Platinum	500,000^{^}
United Kingdom (BPI)	Silver	60,000^{^}
United States (RIAA)	Diamond	10,000,000^{^}
^{^} Shipments figures based on certification alone.
