= 10 Years of Hits =

Compilation album by Ronan Keating
- Released: 11 October 2004
- Recorded: 1999–2004
- Genre: Pop
- Length: 61:11
- Label: Polydor
- Producer: Rick Knowles

Ronan Keating chronology
Turn It On (2003)	10 Years of Hits (2004)	Bring You Home (2006)

Singles from 10 Years of Hits
- 1. "I Hope You Dance" Released: 27 September 2004; 2. "Father and Son" Released: 13 December 2004; 3. "Baby Can I Hold You" Released: 11 July 2005

Professional ratings
Review scores
Source	Rating
AllMusic	4.5/5 stars

10 Years of Hits is the first compilation album released by Boyzone frontman, Ronan Keating. The album was released on 11 October 2004, and included all of Keating's singles to date, plus three new singles, two previously unreleased tracks, and the B-side "This Is Your Song". The album peaked at number one on the UK Albums Chart, becoming the third out of four of Keating's albums to do so. In 2010, an anniversary edition of the album was issued in Australia containing further singles that were released after the original release of the album and was certified 4× Platinum in Australia in 2016.

== Track listing ==
1. "When You Say Nothing at All" (featuring Paulina Rubio) – 4:17 Re-recorded version
2. "Life Is a Rollercoaster" – 3:54 from Ronan
3. "The Way You Make Me Feel" (featuring Bryan Adams) (Single Mix) – 3:38 from Ronan
4. "Lovin' Each Day" – 3:32 from Ronan
5. "If Tomorrow Never Comes" – 3:34 from Destination
6. "I Love It When We Do" – 3:52 from Destination
7. "We've Got Tonight" (featuring Lulu) – 3:37 from Destination
8. "The Long Goodbye (Single Version)" – 4:18 from Destination
9. "Lost for Words" – 3:46 from Turn It On
10. "She Believes (In Me)" (Single Version) – 4:06 from Turn It On
11. "Last Thing on My Mind" (featuring LeAnn Rimes) (Single Version) – 3:57 from Turn It On
12. "Father and Son" (featuring Yusuf) – 3:20 Previously unreleased
13. "Words" – 3:51 Previously unreleased
14. "Baby Can I Hold You" – 3:09 Previously unreleased
15. "I Hope You Dance" – 3:34 Previously unreleased
16. "Somebody Else" – 4:05 Previously unreleased
17. "This Is Your Song (2003 Version)" – 3:59

Bonus Track for Brazil

1. "When You Say Nothing at All" (featuring Deborah Blando) – 4:29 Re-recorded version

Australian Anniversary Edition

1. "When You Say Nothing at All" – 4:17
2. "Life Is a Rollercoaster" – 3:54
3. "The Way You Make Me Feel" – 3:38
4. "Lovin' Each Day" – 3:32
5. "If Tomorrow Never Comes" – 3:34
6. "I Love It When We Do" – 3:52
7. "We've Got Tonight" (featuring Lulu) – 3:37
8. "The Long Goodbye" – 4:18
9. "Lost for Words" – 3:46
10. "She Believes (In Me)" – 4:06
11. "Last Thing on My Mind" (featuring LeAnn Rimes) – 3:57
12. "I Hope You Dance" – 3:34
13. "Father and Son" (featuring Yusuf) – 3:20
14. "Baby Can I Hold You" – 3:09
15. "All Over Again" (featuring Kate Rusby) – 3:42
16. "Iris" – 4:08
17. "This I Promise You" – 3:50
18. "Time After Time" – 3:50
19. "This Is Your Song" – 3:59
20. "Stay" – 3:13
21. "It's Only Christmas" (featuring Kate Ceberano) – 3:26
22. "Believe Again" (featuring Paulini) – 3:39

== Charts ==
=== Weekly charts ===
Chart (2004–2005)	Peak position
Argentine Albums (CAPIF)	19
Australian Albums (ARIA)	13
Austrian Albums (Ö3 Austria)	13
Belgian Albums (Ultratop Wallonia)	76
Danish Albums (Hitlisten)	35
Dutch Albums (Album Top 100)	16
German Albums (Offizielle Top 100)	7
Icelandic Albums (Tónlist)	12
New Zealand Albums (RMNZ)	4
Norwegian Albums (VG-lista)	3
Portuguese Albums (AFP)	9
Singaporean Albums (RIAS)	6
Swedish Albums (Sverigetopplistan)	4
Swiss Albums (Schweizer Hitparade)	8
UK Albums (Official Charts)	1
Chart (2010)	Peak position
Australian Albums (ARIA)	42

=== Year-end charts ===
Chart (2004)	Position
Australian Albums (ARIA)	90
Swedish Albums (Sverigetopplistan)	16
Swiss Albums (Schweizer Hitparade)	98
UK Albums (OCC)	12

Chart (2005)	Position
German Albums (Offizielle Top 100)	38
Swedish Albums (Sverigetopplistan)	81
UK Albums (OCC)	152

Chart (2011)	Position
Australian Albums (ARIA)	100

== Certifications and sales ==
Region	Certification	Certified units/sales
Australia (ARIA)	4× Platinum	280,000^{^}
Germany (BVMI)	Platinum	200,000^{^}
Ireland (IRMA)	2× Platinum	30,000^{^}
New Zealand (RMNZ)	Gold	7,500^{^}
Sweden (GLF)	Platinum	60,000^{^}
United Kingdom (BPI)	4× Platinum	1,200,000^{^}
Summaries
Europe (IFPI)	2× Platinum	2,000,000^{*}
^{*} Sales figures based on certification alone.^{^} Shipments figures based on certification alone.
