= New Zealand top 50 singles of 2001 =

This is a list of the top 50 singles of 2001 in New Zealand.

The New Zealand charts are based on a combination of sales and radio airplay. Anika Moa's hit "Youthful" was never released as a single in New Zealand and achieved its position based on radio airplay alone.

== Chart ==
Key
‡ – Single of New Zealand origin

Number	Artist	Single
1	Craig David	"Walking Away"
2	Nelly Furtado	"Turn Off the Light"
3	Atomic Kitten	"Whole Again"
4	Lifehouse	"Hanging by a Moment"
5	Train	"Drops of Jupiter"
6	Uncle Kracker	"Follow Me"
7	LeAnn Rimes	"Can't Fight the Moonlight"
8	Nelly Furtado	"I'm like a Bird"
9	Che Fu	"Fade Away"^{‡}
10	Gabrielle	"Out of Reach"
11	Matchbox 20	"If You're Gone"
12	Huey Lewis and Gwyneth Paltrow	"Cruisin'"
13	Dido	"Here with Me"
14	Dido	"Thank You"
15	Emma Bunton	"What Took You So Long?"
16	Robbie Williams	"Eternity"
17	Blue	"All Rise"
18	Anika Moa	"Youthful"^{‡}
19	Madonna	"Don't Tell me"
20	Christina Aguilera, Lil' Kim, Mýa and Pink	"Lady Marmalade"
21	Alicia Keys	"Fallin'"
22	Powderfinger	"My Happiness"
23	Blu Cantrell	"Hit 'Em Up Style (Oops!)"
24	Sugar Ray	"When It's Over"
25	S Club 7	"Don't Stop Movin'"
26	Ronan Keating	"Lovin' Each Day"
27	Janet Jackson	"All For You"
28	Ricky Martin and Christina Aguilera	"Nobody Wants to Be Lonely"
29	Incubus	"Drive"
30	Usher	"U Remind Me"
31	Lenny Kravitz	"Again"
32	Eve feat. Gwen Stefani	"Let Me Blow Ya Mind"
33	The Supermen Lovers	"Starlight"
34	Shaggy	"Angel"
35	Robbie Williams	"Supreme"
36	Crazy Town	"Butterfly"
37	Jennifer Lopez	"Love Don't Cost a Thing"
38	K'lee	"Broken Wings"^{‡}
39	Westlife	"Uptown Girl"
40	Atomic Kitten	"Eternal Flame"
41	Dream	"He Loves U Not"
42	Stellar	"All It Takes"^{‡}
43	Westlife	"My Love"
44	Hear'Say	"Pure and Simple"
45	Kylie Minogue	"Can't Get You Out of My Head"
46	Fur Patrol	"Lydia"^{‡}
47	Destiny's Child	"Survivor"
48	Travis (band)	"Sing"
49	Macy Gray feat. Erykah Badu	"Sweet Baby"
50	Staind	"It's Been Awhile"

== Chart by numbers ==
=== Origin ===
==== By artist ====
The following shows the country of origin from where the artist (including any featured artist where applicable) originate from. Artists who appear more than once have only been tallied once.

Country	Total
United States	29
England	9
New Zealand	5
Australia	2
Ireland	2
Canada	1
France	1
Jamaica	1
Puerto Rico	1
Scotland	1

Notes
- Huey Lewis and Gwyneth Paltrow and Christina Aguilera, Lil' Kim, Mýa and P!nk featuring Missy Elliott have been classed as separate entities for Cruisin' and Lady Marmalade respectively.
- Although from Puerto Rico, Ricky Martin was counted with US and Puerto for the collaboration "Nobody Wants to Be Lonely".

==== By single ====
The following shows the country of origin from which the singles originate regardless of who the artist is.

Country	Total
United States	23
England	12
New Zealand	5
Ireland	3
Australia	2
Canada	2
France	1
Jamaica	1
Puerto Rico	1
Scotland	1

=== Most singles ===
Shows the artists with the most singles to appear in this chart. Includes where they appear as a featured artist.

Artist	Total
Robbie Williams	3
Nelly Furtado	2
Dido	2
Atomic Kitten	2
Westlife	2

=== Format ===
The following shows where each single appears on, whether it was the artists album, a non-album single, an extended play or as part of a soundtrack.

Format	Total
Albums	45
Soundtracks	4
non-album singles	1

Notes
- The song "Can't Fight the Moonlight" appears on the soundtrack for Coyote Ugly.
- The song "Out of Reach" appears on the soundtrack for Bridget Jones's Diary and the re-issue of Rise.
- The song "Lady Marmalade" appears on the soundtrack for Moulin Rouge!.
- The song "Cruisin'" appears on the soundtrack for Duets.
- The song "Eternity" was a non-album single at the time (later on Greatest Hits).

=== Multiple releases ===
The following shows singles that had multiple releases from the same album.

Title	Total	Singles
Whoa, Nelly! (Nelly Furtado)	2	Turn Off the Light; I'm Like a Bird
No Angel (Dido)	2	Here with Me; Thank You
Right Now (Atomic Kitten)	2	Whole Again; Eternal Flame
Ronan (Ronan Keating)	2	Lovin' Each Day; Life Is a Rollercoaster

Notes
- Life Is a Rollercoaster and Lovin' Each Day by Ronan Keating are included even though Life is a Rollercoaster appears in the reissue of Ronan

=== Type ===
The following shows the denomination that each single was released as, whether as a solo artist or as part of a group, band or duo. Also shows how many singles had guest artists.

Type	Total
Solo artists	30
Groups	13
Duos	1
Collaborations	2
Featured Artists	5

Notes
- Huey Lewis and Gwyneth Paltrow and Ricky Martin and Christina Aguilera have been regarded as collaborations.
- Eve featuring Gwen Stefani, Macy Gray featuring Erykah Badu have been included in featured artists.
- Christina Aguilera, Lil' Kim, Mýa and P!nk, featuring Missy Elliott have been regarded as a group and having a featured artist in this instance for Lady Marmalade.

=== Top Genre ===
The following shows the most common genres the Top 50 singles are regarded as (as per their genre descriptions in the singles entries. Where a genre was not noted, the genre of the album/extended play was used instead. Subgenres split as separate entries).

Genre	Total	Singles
Pop	22	All Rise (Blue); Can't Fight the Moonlight (LeAnn Rimes); Cruisin' - (Huey Lewis and Gwyneth Paltrow); Don't Stop Movin' (S Club 7); Eternity (Robbie Williams); Follow Me (Uncle Kracker); He Loves U Not (Dream); Here with Me (Dido); If You're Gone (Matchbox Twenty); Lady Marmalade (Christina Aguilera, Lil' Kim, Mýa & P!nk) feat. Missy Elliott; Lovin' Each Day (Ronan Keating); Nobody Wants to Be Lonely (Ricky Martin & Christina Aguilera); Out of Reach (Gabrielle); Pure and Simple (Hear'Say); Supreme (Robbie Williams); Turn Off the Light (Nelly Furtado); Uptown Girl (Westlife); Walking Away (Craig David); What Took You So Long? (Emma Bunton); When It's Over (Sugar Ray); Youthful (Anika Moa)
R&B	14	All For You (Janet Jackson); All Rise (Blue); Fallin' - (Alicia Keys); Hit 'Em Up Style (Oops!) (Blu Cantrell); Lady Marmalade (Christina Aguilera et al.); Let Me Blow Ya Mind (Eve feat. Gwen Stefani); Survivor (Destiny's Child); Sweet Baby (Macy Gray feat. Erykah Badu); U Remind Me (Usher); Walking Away (Craig David); He Loves U Not (Dream); All It Takes (Stellar*); Broken Wings (K'lee); Fade Away (Che Fu)
Pop rock	9	Drops of Jupiter (Train); Follow Me (Uncle Kracker); If You're Gone (Matchbox Twenty); Lovin' Each Day (Ronan Keating); Sing (Travis); Walking Away (Craig David); What Took You So Long? (Emma Bunton); When It's Over (Sugar Ray); Can't Fight the Moonlight (LeAnn Rimes)
Rock	8	Drops of Jupiter (Train); Drive (Incubus); Eternity (Robbie Williams); Follow Me (Uncle Kracker); If You're Gone (Matchbox Twenty); Lydia (Fur Patrol); Sing (Travis); Again (Lenny Kravitz)
Dance-pop	6	All For You (Janet Jackson); Can't Get You Out of My Head (Kylie Minogue); Don't Stop Movin' (S Club 7); He Loves U Not (Dream); Survivor (Destiny's Child); Uptown Girl (Westlife)
Alternative rock	5	Drops of Jupiter (Train); Drive (Incubus); Hanging by a Moment (Lifehouse); Lydia (Fur Patrol); If You're Gone (Matchbox Twenty)
Hip hop	4	Butterfly (Crazy Town); Fade Away (Che Fu); Follow Me (Uncle Kracker); Let Me Blow Ya Mind (Eve)
Soul	4	Fallin' - (Alicia Keys); Lady Marmalade - Out of Reach (Gabrielle); Sweet Baby (Macy Gray)
Disco	2	Don't Stop Movin' (S Club 7); Lady Marmalade -
House	2	Don't Stop Movin' (S Club 7); Starlight (The Supermen Lovers)
Nu-disco	2	Don't Stop Movin' (S Club 7); Starlight (The Supermen Lovers)

=== Top Labels ===
Label	Total	Singles
Virgin	6	All For You (Janet Jackson); Again (Lenny Kravitz); Whole Again (Atomic Kitten); All Rise (Blue); What Took You So Long? (Emma Bunton); Eternal Flame (Atomic Kitten)
Columbia	4	Butterfly (Crazy Town); Drops of Jupiter (Train); Nobody Wants to Be Lonely (Ricky Martin & Christina Aguilera); Survivor (Destiny's Child)
DreamWorks	4	Hanging by a Moment (Lifehouse); I'm Like a Bird (Nelly Furtado); Turn Off the Light (Nelly Furtado); Whoa, Nelly! singles
Epic	4	Drive (Incubus); Sweet Baby (Macy Gray); Fade Away (Che Fu - via Sony); Sing (Travis)
Polydor	3	Don't Stop Movin' (S Club 7); Lovin' Each Day (Ronan Keating); Pure and Simple (Hear'Say)
Arista	3	Here with Me (Dido); Hit 'Em Up Style (Oops!) (Blu Cantrell); U Remind Me (Usher)

=== Top songwriters ===
Writer	Total	Singles
Guy Chambers	4	Eternity (Robbie Williams); Supreme (Robbie Williams); Lovin' Each Day (Ronan Keating); Rock DJ (Robbie Williams)
Robbie Williams	3	Eternity (Robbie Williams); Supreme (Robbie Williams); Rock DJ(Robbie Williams)
Nelly Furtado	2	Turn Off the Light (Nelly Furtado); I'm Like a Bird (Nelly Furtado)
Dido Armstrong	2	Here with Me (Dido); Thank You (Dido)
Gregg Alexander	2	Lovin' Each Day (Ronan Keating); Life Is a Rollercoaster(Ronan Keating

=== Most/Least songwriters ===
Single	Total	Songwriter/s
"Youthful" (Anika Moa)	1	Anika Moa
"Hanging by a Moment" (Lifehouse)	1	Jason Wade
"Can't Fight the Moonlight" (LeAnn Rimes)	1	Diane Warren
"If You're Gone" (Matchbox Twenty)	1	Rob Thomas
"Fallin' - (Alicia Keys)	1	Alicia Keys
"Again" (Lenny Kravitz)	1	Lenny Kravitz
"Sing" (Travis)	1	Fran Healy
"Don't Stop Movin'" (S Club 7)	9	Simon Ellis; Sheppard Solomon; Tina Barrett; Paul Cattermole; Jon Lee; Bradley McIntosh; Jo O'Meara; Hannah Spearritt; Rachel Stevens

=== Top producers ===
Producer	Total	Singles
Guy Chambers	3	Eternity (Robbie Williams); Supreme (Robbie Williams); Lovin' Each Day (Ronan Keating)
Steve Power	2	Eternity (Robbie Williams); Supreme (Robbie Williams)
Gregg Alexander	2	Lovin' Each Day (Ronan Keating); Life Is a Rollercoaster
Rick Nowels	2	Here with Me (Dido); Lovin' Each Day (Ronan Keating)
