= Turn It On =

Studio album by Ronan Keating
- Released: 17 November 2003
- Recorded: 2002–2003
- Studio: Stockholm, Sweden
- Genre: Pop; rock
- Length: 54:04
- Label: Polydor
- Producer: Mark Taylor; David Frank; Steve Robson; The Matrix; Alan Branch; Rob Davis; Gregg Alexander

Ronan Keating chronology
Destination (2002)	Turn It On (2003)	10 Years of Hits (2004)

Singles from Turn It On
- 1. "Lost for Words" Released: 10 November 2003; 2. "She Believes (In Me)" Released: 9 February 2004; 3. "Last Thing on My Mind" Released: 3 May 2004

Professional ratings
Review scores
Source	Rating
Entertainment.ie	2/5 stars
Soul Shine Magazine	3/5

Turn It On is the third studio album released by Boyzone frontman and Irish singer-songwriter Ronan Keating. The album was released on 17 November 2003, a week after the release of the lead single, "Lost for Words". The album peaked at number 21 on the UK Albums Chart. The album spawned two further singles: a cover of Kenny Rogers' "She Believes (In Me)" and a duet with American country superstar, LeAnn Rimes, "Last Thing on My Mind", which both became top ten hits in the United Kingdom.

== Background ==
Following the success of Destination, and the four top ten singles which were released from it, Keating quickly returned to the studio in an attempt to record a follow-up which would replicate the success of Destination. Hooking up with producer Mark Taylor, who had at the time given chart-topping success to Spanish singer-songwriter Enrique Iglesias, Keating also collaborated with long-time collaborators Steve Robson and Steve Mac, as well as writing two songs with former co-writer Gregg Alexander. He also hooked up with American country superstar LeAnn Rimes, who at the time was also signed to his record label, Polydor, to record the duet "Last Thing on My Mind". He also recorded an updated version of "This is Your Song", one of four main recordings of the track, which have featured on Keating's releases across the years. The British version of the album contains two additional tracks. It was intended to include a hidden track "Getting Started", however this remains unreleased. The Latin American version of the album features the duet "The Flight", featuring Latin superstar Zucchero, and an updated version of "When You Say Nothing at All", featuring Spanish singer-songwriter Paulina Rubio, which was later released in the United Kingdom as the B-side to the single "Father & Son". The Special Edition has a blue interior whereas the regular has an orange interior.

== Singles ==
- "Lost for Words" was released as the album's lead single on 10 November 2003, peaking at #9 on the UK Singles Chart. The song was co-written by Keating, alongside David Frank and Wayne Hector. The single was backed with the B-sides "I Couldn't Love You More" and "It Was You", as well an acoustic version and a remix by Robbie Rivera.
- "She Believes (in Me)" was released as the album's second single on 9 February 2004, peaking at #2 on the UK Singles Chart. A cover of the original by Kenny Rogers, the single was backed with live BBC Radio 2 sessions of "First Time" and "Lovin' Each Day", as well as a remix by Metro, and an updated radio version of "If Tomorrow Never Comes".
- "Last Thing on My Mind" was released as the album's third and final single on 3 May 2004, peaking at #5 on the UK Singles Chart. A duet with American country superstar LeAnn Rimes, the single was backed with remixes by Metro and Mo Monkey, as well as the music video, which received airplay on VH1 in the United States due to Rimes' appearance.

== Track listing ==
Standard version
No.	Title	Writer(s)	Producer(s)	Length
1.	"Turn It On Again"	Ronan Keating, Malcolm Pardon, Fredrik Rinman, Ricky Ross	Mark Taylor	3:18
2.	"Lost for Words"	Keating, David Frank, Wayne Hector	Frank, Ash Howes (add.)	3:48
3.	"She Gets Me Inside"	Keating, Ross	Taylor	3:19
4.	"First Time"	Keating, Paul Barry, Taylor	Taylor	4:13
5.	"Last Thing on My Mind" (featuring LeAnn Rimes)	Keating, Steve Robson	Robson	3:57
6.	"Let Her Down Easy"	Terence Trent D'Arby	Taylor	4:33
7.	"Back in the Day"	Keating, Lauren Christy, Scott Spock, Graham Edwards	The Matrix	3:17
8.	"She Believes (In Me)"	Steve Gibb	Taylor	4:08
9.	"On My Way"	Keating, Calum MacColl, James McNally	MacColl, Alan Branch	4:15
10.	"The Best of Me"	Keating, Barry	Taylor	3:53
11.	"Hold You Now"	Keating, Barry, Taylor	Taylor	4:00
12.	"This is Your Song"	Keating, Steve Mac	MacColl, Branch	4:02

UK version (bonus tracks)
No.	Title	Writer(s)	Producer(s)	Length
13.	"I Wouldn't Change a Thing"	Keating, Paul Barry, Mark Taylor	Taylor	3:44
14.	"Give You What You Want"	Keating, Gregg Alexander, Davis	Alexander	3:29

Latin American version (bonus tracks)
No.	Title	Writer(s)	Producer(s)	Length
13.	"The Flight" (featuring Zucchero)	Frank Musker, Zucchero	Frank Musker	4:56
14.	"When You Say Nothing at All" (featuring Paulina Rubio)	Donald Alan Schlitz Jr., Paul Overstreet	Steve Mac	4:23

== Charts ==
=== Weekly charts ===
Chart (2003)	Peak position
Australian Albums (ARIA)	25
Austrian Albums (Ö3 Austria)	45
Dutch Albums (Album Top 100)	89
German Albums (Offizielle Top 100)	18
Irish Albums (IRMA)	57
Norwegian Albums (VG-lista)	29
Scottish Albums (OCC)	11
Swedish Albums (Sverigetopplistan)	54
Swiss Albums (Schweizer Hitparade)	19
UK Albums (OCC)	21

=== Year-end charts ===
Chart (2003)	Position
UK Albums (OCC)	180
Chart (2004)	Position
UK Albums (OCC)	160

== Certifications ==
Region	Certification	Certified units/sales
Australia (ARIA)	Gold	35,000^{^}
United Kingdom (BPI)	Gold	100,000^{^}
^{^} Shipments figures based on certification alone.
