= To Deserve You =

Single by Bette Midler

from the album Bette of Roses
- Released: June 1995
- Genre: Pop
- Length: 4:36
- Label: Atlantic
- Songwriter: Maria McKee
- Producer: Arif Mardin

Bette Midler singles chronology
| "In My Life" (1992) | "To Deserve You" (1995) | "In This Life" (1995) |

Music video
- "To Deserve You" on YouTube

"To Deserve You" is a song recorded by American singer and actress Bette Midler for her eighth studio album, Bette of Roses (1995). The song was written by Maria McKee and produced by Arif Mardin. The single version, released in June 1995 by Atlantic Records, was notably different to the recording featured on the album, with the single release featuring a more dance composition in contrast to the country ballad version included on the album. The accompanying music video was directed by Marcus Nispel.

== Background ==
"To Deserve You" is described as "a poignant exploration of self-worth and the deep desire to be worthy of someone’s love", with the lyrical composition of the song describing admiration for a particular love interest, describing them as "almost ethereal, with their feet not touching the ground". Throughout the song, the lyrics "how I want, how I want to deserve you" creates a profound sense of an admirers feelings of inadequacy and longing to deserve their interest. Throughout the duration of the song, Midler explores the "complexities of self-doubt and vulnerability", with the lyrics appearing to suggest that she feels "out of rhythm and too demanding" which would suggest a feeling of being seen in a "less-than-perfect light". In the song, Midler sings about "the dawn’s light", something which would suggest a new chapter for someone, however, in the song, it is described as "cruel", highlighting the insecurities that Midler feels towards the subject of her admiration.

== Release ==
The song was released as the lead single from her eighth studio album Bette of Roses (1995). A remix version of the song, styled as a dance production rather than the studio album which was performed in a country style, more or less only retained the lead vocals and a sample of the spoken line "I would die for you" from the album version. The original backing track of the album version was replaced with a 123 BPM mid-'90s dance production in the style of house music. In Europe, Australia and New Zealand, the remix single was issued to promote Atlantic/Warner Music's expanded re-release of Midler's 1993 hits compilation Experience the Divine: Greatest Hits—on which it was placed as the opening track—instead of the actual Bette of Roses album. To promote the release of the single, Midler performed the song during the 1995 VH1 Honors Awards ceremony.

In the United States, it peaked at number two on the Billboard Dance Club Songs charts and nineteen on the Billboard Dance Singles Sales. It reached the top ten on both the Dutch Top 40 and Dutch Single Top 100 in the Netherlands, whilst in Japan it reached number fourteen and number eighteen on the Canadian Adult Contemporary charts.

== Critical reception ==
Larry Flick of Billboard magazine stated that Midler has released a sparkling pop gem that perfectly demonstrates her delightfully theatrical style. Commenting on the remixes, Flick wrote that the DJs with their production tried to melt the diva's voice in rocking rhythms, and that they would definitely stir up the imagination of the dance floor regulars with solid results. He also suggested that although it is difficult to imagine an airy pop ballad in a stylistic setting that ranges from harsh and underground to festive, it actually works well, mainly thanks to Midler's performance, which is strong enough to withstand such aggressive grooves.

== Commercial performance ==
The song became the lead single from the album. Thanks to the released remixes, the song was a great success on the US Dance Club Songs chart, reaching number two. The song was also a number-one hit in Israel for three weeks, and popular in the Netherlands, where the remix was added to the extended European reissue of the compilation Experience the Divine: Greatest Hits. The album itself topped the chart, and the single entered the top ten.

== Music video ==
The music video for "To Deserve You" was directed by German director Marcus Nispel, it was released in rotation simultaneously with the release of the single. In the video, Midler poses and dances on the set in a white dress. The video for the remixed version was remounted from the original.

== Track listing ==
- 12" single (USA)

A1. "To Deserve You" (Arif's Club Mix) – 7:55
A2. "To Deserve You" (Bonzai's Club Mix) – 7:00
B1. "To Deserve You" (MK Club Mix) – 6:39
B2. "To Deserve You" (MK Dub 1) – 5:00
B3. "To Deserve You" (MK Dub 2) – 4:40

- 12" single (Canada)

A1. "To Deserve You" (Arif's Club Mix) – 7:55
A2. "To Deserve You" (Bonzai's Club Mix) – 7:20
B1. "To Deserve You" (MK Mix) – 6:39
B2. "To Deserve You" (Single Remix) – 4:08
B3. "To Deserve You" (Album Version) – 5:13

- 12" promotional single (USA)

A1. "To Deserve You" (Bonzai's «Die 4» Mix) – 7:00
A2. "To Deserve You" (Plastic Vocal Journey) – 8:01
B1. "To Deserve You" (Edge Factor Dub) – 7:30
B2. "To Deserve You" (Mondo & Jesse Mix) – 4:20

- CD single
1. "To Deserve You" (Arif's Radio Mix) – 4:12
2. "To Deserve You" (Bonzai Club Mix) – 7:20
3. "To Deserve You" (Bonzai's «Die 4» Mix) – 7:01
4. "To Deserve You" (Arif's Club Mix) – 7:56
5. "To Deserve You" (MK Mix) – 6:40
6. "To Deserve You" (Album Version) – 4:36

- MC single
1. "To Deserve You" – 4:36
2. «Up! Up! Up!» – 2:44

== Charts ==
=== Weekly charts ===
Weekly chart performance for "To Deserve You"
| Chart (1995–1996) | Peak position |
|---|---|
| Canada Adult Contemporary (RPM) | 18 |
| Israel (Israeli Singles Chart) | 1 |
| Japan (Oricon) | 14 |
| Netherlands (Dutch Top 40) | 5 |
| Netherlands (Single Top 100) | 7 |
| US Dance Club Songs (Billboard) | 2 |
| US Dance Singles Sales (Billboard) | 19 |

=== Year-end charts ===
Year-end chart performance for "To Deserve You"
| Chart (1996) | Position |
|---|---|
| Israel (Israeli Singles Chart) | 30 |
| Netherlands (Dutch Top 40) | 12 |
| Netherlands (Single Top 100) | 27 |
| US Dance Club Songs (Billboard) | 45 |
