= I Love It When We Do =

2002 single by Ronan Keating

Single by Ronan Keating

from the album Destination
- B-side: "Joy and Pain" (live)
- Released: 2 September 2002
- Studio: Various
- Length: 3:53
- Label: Polydor
- Songwriters: Gregg Alexander, Rick Nowels
- Producers: Gregg Alexander, Rick Nowels

Ronan Keating singles chronology
"If Tomorrow Never Comes" (2002)	"I Love It When We Do" (2002)	"We've Got Tonight" (2002)

"I Love It When We Do" is the second single from Irish singer-songwriter Ronan Keating's second studio album, Destination. It was first released in Australia on 2 September 2002 and was issued in the United Kingdom seven days later. The single peaked at number five on the UK Singles Chart and reached the top 40 in Australia and Ireland. In 2003, Keating re-recorded the song with additional vocals from French actress and singer Cécilia Cara, re-titled "Je t'aime plus que tout". This version peaked at number 11 in France and number nine in the Wallonia region of Belgium.

== Track listings ==
UK CD1

1. "I Love It When We Do"
2. "Solitary Song"
3. "I Love It When We Do" (Groove Collision remix)
4. "I Love It When We Do" (video)

UK CD2

1. "I Love It When We Do"
2. "Life Is a Rollercoaster" (live from Wembley)
3. "Joy and Pain" (live from Wembley)
4. "Life Is a Rollercoaster" (video—live from Wembley)

UK cassette single

A. "I Love It When We Do"
B. "Joy and Pain" (live from Wembley)

French CD single

1. "Je t'aime plus que tout"
2. "I Love It When We Do"

== Credits and personnel ==
Credits are lifted from the Destination album booklet.

Studios

- Recorded at various studios in Los Angeles, London, and Dublin
- Mixed at Sarm West (London, England)
- Mastered at Gateway Mastering (Portland, Maine, US)

Personnel

- Gregg Alexander – writing, production
- Rick Nowels – writing, background vocals, acoustic guitar, acoustic piano, Mellotron, Wurlitzer, production
- Danielle Brisebois – background vocals
- Alex Brown – background vocals
- Sue Ann Carwell – background vocals
- Kristle Murden – background vocals
- John Themis – guitar, bazouki, percussion
- Rusty Anderson – electric guitars, bazouki
- Tim Pierce – electric guitars
- John Pierce – bass
- Charlie Judge – keyboard, sound design, Pro Tools editing
- Greg Kurstin – keyboards
- Wayne Rodrigues – keyboard, drum programming, Pro Tools editing
- Denny Fongheiser – cymbals, toms, percussion
- Dave Way – mixing
- Bob Ludwig – mastering

== Charts ==
=== "I Love It When We Do" ===
==== Weekly charts ====
Chart (2002)	Peak position
Australia (ARIA)	32
Austria (Ö3 Austria Top 40)	42
Belgium (Ultratip Bubbling Under Flanders)	6
Europe (Eurochart Hot 100)	24
Germany (GfK)	56
Ireland (IRMA)	12
Netherlands (Single Top 100)	67
Romania (Romanian Top 100)	68
Scotland Singles (OCC)	6
Sweden (Sverigetopplistan)	49
Switzerland (Schweizer Hitparade)	41
UK Singles (OCC)	5
UK Airplay (Music Week)	5

==== Year-end charts ====
Chart (2002)	Position
UK Singles (OCC)	196

=== "Je t'aime plus que tout" (with Cécilia Cara) ===
==== Weekly charts ====
Chart (2003)	Peak position
Belgium (Ultratop 50 Wallonia)	9
Europe (Eurochart Hot 100)	37
France (SNEP)	11
Switzerland (Schweizer Hitparade)	17

==== Year-end charts ====
Chart (2003)	Position
Belgium (Ultratop 50 Wallonia)	53
France (SNEP)	79

== Release history ==
Region	Date	Format(s)	Label(s)	Ref.
Australia	2 September 2002	CD	Polydor	
United Kingdom	9 September 2002	CD; cassette	Polydor	
