= Bette of Roses =

Studio album by Bette Midler
- Released: July 18, 1995
- Studio: The Hit Factory (New York, NY); Right Track Recording (New York, NY); Andora Studios (California); Conway Recording Studios (Los Angeles, CA); Record One (Los Angeles, CA)
- Length: 50:35
- Label: Atlantic
- Producer: Arif Mardin

Bette Midler chronology
Gypsy (1993)	Bette of Roses (1995)	Bathhouse Betty (1998)

Singles from Bette of Roses
- 1. "To Deserve You" Released: June 1995; 2. "In This Life" Released: 1995

Bette of Roses is the eighth studio album by the American singer Bette Midler. It was released by Atlantic Records on July 18, 1995, in the United States. The title was a play on the title of one of the tracks, "Bed of Roses". It became Midler's final album for the label, twenty-three years after the release of her debut album The Divine Miss M, since she was transferred to Atlantic's sister label Warner Bros. Records for her next two albums, then left the Warner group completely in 2002 when she signed with the Sony-owned Columbia Records.

== Composition ==
Bette of Roses marked a change in musical direction as it exclusively included contemporary material composed by songwriters in the soft rock, country and folk genres such as Cheryl Wheeler, Maria McKee, Bonnie Hayes, Marc Jordan, Tonio K, Andy Hill, Pete Sinfield and Roger Cook. "In This Life" had been recorded by country singer Collin Raye on his 1992 album of the same name. According to AllMusic's review, Midler is said to have personally chosen the track listing from "hundreds and hundreds of songs." Just like Some People's Lives the album was chiefly produced by Arif Mardin, but the arrangements were consequently also more guitar-based and the soundscape altogether more acoustic than synthesized, the songs chosen were mainly midtempo ballads, like "Bottomless," "As Dreams Go By" and "I Believe In You," or country rock influenced tracks, like "I Know This Town" and "The Last Time," and the set as a whole was geared towards the American adult contemporary and adult Top 40 markets rather than the pop or dance charts.

== Promotion ==
A remixed dance version of Maria McKee's country rock ballad "To Deserve You," which more or less only retained the lead vocals and a sample of the spoken line "I would die for you" from the album version, which had been arranged by the composer herself. The original backing track was replaced with a 123 BPM mid-'90s dance production in the style of house music remixers like Shep Pettibone, Frankie Knuckles and Junior Vasquez, although it in fact had been remixed and re-produced by Arif Mardin himself. The promo video was also re-edited and re-released, then using the dance remix instead of the original Bette of Roses recording. In Europe, Australia and New Zealand the remix single was issued to promote Atlantic/Warner Music's expanded re-release of Midler's 1993 hits compilation Experience the Divine: Greatest Hits—on which it was placed as the opening track—instead of the actual Bette of Roses album. Although notably different to Midler's original recording of the song and indeed the whole Bette of Roses album project as such, the dance remix of "To Deserve You" proved to be one of the biggest commercial successes of her musical career as the track became a major dancefloor hit in the US in early 1996, reaching No. 1 on the Hot Dance Club Play chart.

== Critical reception ==
Professional ratings
Review scores
Source	Rating
AllMusic	4/5 stars
Cash Box	(favorable)
Los Angeles Times	1.5/4 stars
Music & Media	(favorable)
Robert Christgau	(dud)
The Rolling Stone Album Guide	3/5 stars

AllMusic editor Peter Fawthrop rated the album four out of five stars and called Bette of Roses a "very focused album." He further wrote: "Midler brings a very poignant and inspiring set this time round; with less emphasis on laughs, it almost works as an extension of 1990's Some People's Lives [...] There is a certain degree of sentimentality on Bette of Roses, but it never turns drippy [...] Bette of Roses, like so many of the Divine Miss M's offerings, is cause for celebration." Los Angeles Times critic Jean Rosenbluth found that "pretty much the only thing about Bette of Roses that will raise a smile is its cute title. Which is not to say the album is wholly without appeal. It's just that the entertainment it provides is so, well, mainstream. The shallowness of the material practically every selection is the aural equivalent of a romance novel – is almost unbearable. And the presentation isn't much better." In a retrospective review of the album, Peter Piatkowski from PopMatters called the album "a warm embrace."

== Chart performance ==
Upon its release, Bette of Roses proved to be Midler's lowest-charting studio album since 1983's No Frills, peaking at number 45 on US Billboard 200 and number 55 on the UK Albums Chart. A steady seller, it was eventually certified Platinum by the Recording Industry Association of America (RIAA) in 2001, six years after its original release. In the United Kingdom, it was certified Silver by the British Phonographic Industry (BPI) in 2013.

== Track listing ==
All tracks produced by Arif Mardin.

Bette of Roses track listing
No.	Title	Writer(s)	Length
1.	"I Know This Town"	Cheryl Wheeler	3:54
2.	"In This Life"	Mike Reid; Allen Shamblin	4:11
3.	"Bottomless"	Bonnie Hayes	5:18
4.	"To Comfort You"	Ian Thomas	4:44
5.	"To Deserve You"	Maria McKee	5:16
6.	"The Last Time"	McKee	4:52
7.	"Bed of Roses"	Hayes	4:12
8.	"The Perfect Kiss"	Scott Tibbs; Marc Jordan	3:43
9.	"As Dreams Go By"	Andy Hill; Pete Sinfield	5:09
10.	"It's Too Late"	Tonio K; Bob Thiele, Jr.; Hayes	4:42
11.	"I Believe in You"	Sam Hogin; Roger Cook	4:34

== Personnel ==
Musicians

- Bette Midler – lead vocals, harmony vocals
- Lani Groves – background vocals
- Ula Hedwig – background vocals
- Vaneese Thomas – background vocals
- Angela Cappelli – background vocals
- Rachele Cappelli – background vocals
- Mike Baird – drums
- Joe Mardin – drums, background vocals
- Paulinho da Costa – percussion
- Michael O'Reilly – guitar
- Dean Parks – guitar
- Danny Jacob – guitar
- Michael Landau – guitar
- Jay Dee Maness – steel guitar
- Buzz Feiten – guitar, rhythm guitar, tambourine
- Jerry Barnes – bass guitar, background vocals
- Michael Visceglia – bass
- Tom "T-Bone" Wolk – bass
- Reggie Hamilton – bass
- Abraham Laboriel – bass
- Bobby Lyle – piano
- Robbie Buchanan – piano, keyboards, synthesizer, programming
- Robbie Kondor – organ, electric piano, keyboards, synthesizer, programming
- Steve Skinner – keyboards, synthesizer, programming
- Larry Cohn – synthesizer
- Marc Mann – programming
- Jimmy Bralower – drum programming
- Bonnie Hayes – programming
- Chris Botti – trumpet
- Shelley Woodworth – oboe
- Gene Orloff – violin, concert master

Production

- Arif Mardin – record producer, musical arranger
- Marc Mann – producer
- Robbie Buchanan – producer, arranger
- Robbie Kondor – producer, arranger
- Steve Skinner – producer, arranger
- Bonnie Hayes – producer, arranger
- Buzz Feiten – associate producer, arranger
- Maria McKee – arranger
- Bruce Brody – arranger
- Andy Grassi – engineer
- Michael O'Reilly – engineer
- Jack Joseph Puig – engineer
- George Marino – mastering
- Recorded at The New Hit Factory and Right Track Recording, New York; Andora Studios, Conway Studios and Record One, California.

== Charts ==
Chart performance for Bette of Roses
Chart (1995)	Peak position
Australian Albums (ARIA)	51
Canada Top Albums/CDs (RPM)	69
German Albums (Offizielle Top 100)	74
Japanese Albums (Oricon)	45
Scottish Albums (Official Charts)	67
UK Albums (Official Charts)	55
US Billboard 200	45
US Top 100 Pop Albums (Cash Box)	17

== Certifications ==
Certifications for Bette of Roses
Region	Certification	Certified units/sales
United Kingdom (BPI)	Silver	60,000^{^}
United States (RIAA)	Platinum	1,000,000^{^}
^{^} Shipments figures based on certification alone.
