= Much Too Young (To Feel This Damn Old) =

Single by Garth Brooks

from the album Garth Brooks
- B-side: "Alabama Clay"
- Released: March 6, 1989
- Recorded: 1987
- Studio: Jack's Tracks (Nashville, Tennessee)
- Genre: Country
- Length: 2:58 (album version)
- Label: Capitol Nashville
- Songwriters: Randy Taylor; Garth Brooks
- Producer: Allen Reynolds

Garth Brooks singles chronology
"Much Too Young (To Feel This Damn Old)" (1989)	"If Tomorrow Never Comes" (1989)

"Much Too Young (To Feel This Damn Old)" is a song recorded by American country music artist Garth Brooks. It was released in March 1989 as his debut single, and was served as the first single from his self-titled debut album. It was co-written by Garth Brooks and Randy Taylor. In the U.S., the song peaked at number 8 on the Billboard Hot Country Songs chart.

== Content ==
The song is about a rodeo cowboy who is losing his will to keep competing due to the stress of constantly being away from home. He is grappling with aging as a younger crowd is taking over the industry.

== Background and production ==
The fact that Chris LeDoux was mentioned in this song led to the champion rodeo bareback rider and country music singer-songwriter being introduced to a wider audience. Chris was surprised to hear his name in the song on the radio one day and set out to meet Garth: "We finally met about eight months after that song had come out. A promoter put us together on the same bill. At the Cocky Bull in Victorville, California. And Garth for some reason insisted on opening for me, but it was great. One of the things that impressed me about him, The first thing he said to me, 'You know Chris using your name in that song, you wouldn't believe how that's helped my career.' We hit it off pretty good." Brooks, who is a major fan of his, convinced Capitol Records to give him a record contract and would later sing a duet with him on "Whatcha Gonna Do with a Cowboy". Brooks would do one more duet with LeDoux on "Somethings Never Change" in LeDoux's 2002 album After the Storm.

Garth provided the following background information on the song in the CD booklet liner notes from The Hits:

"'Much Too Young' will always be my sentimental favorite because it was my very first single. It was a baby that I watched grow up. Whenever I hear it today, I have a smile on my face. It want to give a big thanks to Randy Taylor and Chris LeDoux. Randy was the writer and Chris was probably the reason that it was played. Hey Chris, Randy and I decided a long time ago that we owe you a beer, pal."

== Music video ==
A music video was not made at the time of the song's release. A video that was included on The Ultimate Hits (2007) featured an overdubbed and edited performance of the song for the 15th season of Austin City Limits in 1990.

== Chart positions ==
"Much Too Young" debuted at number 94 on Billboard's Country Singles chart on March 25, 1989. It peaked at number 8 on that chart on July 15, 1989.

Chart (1989)	Peak position
Canada Country Singles (RPM)	9
US Hot Country Songs (Billboard)	8

=== Year-end charts ===
Chart (1989)	Position
Canada Country Tracks (RPM)	98
US Country Songs (Billboard)	64
