= Garth Brooks (album) =

Studio album by Garth Brooks
- Released: April 12, 1989
- Recorded: Late 1987 – early 1988
- Studio: Jack's Tracks (Nashville, Tennessee)
- Genre: Neotraditional country
- Length: 32:43
- Label: Capitol Nashville
- Producer: Allen Reynolds

Garth Brooks chronology
Garth Brooks (1989)	No Fences (1990)

Singles from Garth Brooks
- 1. "Much Too Young (To Feel This Damn Old)" Released: March 6, 1989; 2. "If Tomorrow Never Comes" Released: August 21, 1989; 3. "Not Counting You" Released: January 8, 1990; 4. "The Dance" Released: April 30, 1990

Garth Brooks is the debut album by American country music artist Garth Brooks, released on April 12, 1989, through Capitol Nashville. It was both a critical and chart success, peaking at No. 13 on the Billboard 200 and at No. 2 on the Top Country Albums chart. The album has been certified diamond by the Recording Industry Association of America (RIAA) for shipments over ten million copies.

== Background ==
Brooks commented on the album, saying:

This album was released in April 1989, in the States. Definitely scared to death. I thought the album was very very innocent. And I gotta be truthful with you, every time I hear those songs off the radio or off the album itself, or even when we play them live. I really get that same kind of scared feeling, that I had, way back in 1988, and 1989. Whether you get the album or not, or whether you have the album or not. Thanks, for just, the interest. That first album is always a big one for any artist and I, without trying to sound egotistical, I'm very proud of my first one.

== Musical style and composition ==
Garth Brooks has been labeled as a neotraditional country album, with elements of traditional country subgenres such as honky-tonk and Western swing, and non-country based genres such as rock and roll and pop music that Brooks would further expand upon on his follow-up album, No Fences. It has been compared to the styles of traditional country artists such as George Jones and George Strait.

== Singles ==
This album contains Brooks' earliest hits, for instance his first ever single, "Much Too Young (To Feel This Damn Old)", which peaked at No. 8 on the Country Billboard Charts in 1989. It put the name of an independent cowboy singer, Chris LeDoux, into the mainstream due to the lyric "A worn out tape of Chris LeDoux" Two other strong starts include his first No. 1, "If Tomorrow Never Comes" and the Academy of Country Music's 1990 Song of the Year and Video of the Year, "The Dance" (another No. 1). It also features his first hit he wrote entirely in "Not Counting You", another top 10 success.

== Notable covers ==
Punk rock cover artists Me First and the Gimme Gimmes released a version of "Much Too Young (To Feel This Damn Old)" as the first track on their October 2006 album Me First and the Gimme Gimmes Love Their Country.

"If Tomorrow Never Comes" has been covered by Ronan Keating (former lead singer of Irish group Boyzone), and many other famous singers including Barry Manilow.

Moe Bandy previously recorded "Nobody Gets Off in This Town" on his 1988 album No Regrets.

== Critical reception ==
Professional ratings
Review scores
Source	Rating
AllMusic	3/5 stars
Chicago Tribune	3.5/4 stars
The Rolling Stone Album Guide	3/5 stars

USA Today deemed the album "core country with heartfelt, hurtin' vocals and country timelessness."

== Commercial performance ==
Garth Brooks peaked at No. 13 on the US Billboard 200, and peaked at No. 2 on the Top Country Albums. In November 2006, it was certified diamond by the Recording Industry Association of America (RIAA) for shipments of over ten million copies in the United States. To date, the album has shipped ten million copies in the US.

== Track listing ==
Original release
No.	Title	Writer(s)	Length
1.	"Not Counting You"	Garth Brooks	2:34
2.	"I've Got a Good Thing Going"	Larry Bastian; Brooks; Sandy Mahl	2:54
3.	"If Tomorrow Never Comes"	Kent Blazy; Brooks	3:41
4.	"Everytime That It Rains"	Brooks; Ty England; Charlie Stefl	4:12
5.	"Alabama Clay"	Larry Cordle; Ronny Scaife	3:39
6.	"Much Too Young (To Feel This Damn Old)"	Brooks; Randy Taylor	2:58
7.	"Cowboy Bill"	Bastian; Ed Berghoff	4:33
8.	"Nobody Gets Off in This Town"	Bastian; DeWayne Blackwell	2:19
9.	"I Know One"	Jack Clement	2:55
10.	"The Dance"	Tony Arata	3:38
Total length:			33:23

Limited Series release
No.	Title	Writer(s)	Length
1.	"Not Counting You"		2:34
2.	"I've Got a Good Thing Going"		2:54
3.	"If Tomorrow Never Comes"		3:41
4.	"Uptown Down-Home Good Ol' Boy"	Blackwell; Earl Bud Lee	3:05
5.	"Everytime That It Rains"		4:12
6.	"Alabama Clay"		3:39
7.	"Much Too Young (To Feel This Damn Old)"		2:58
8.	"Cowboy Bill"		4:33
9.	"Nobody Gets Off in This Town"		2:19
10.	"I Know One"		2:55
11.	"The Dance"		3:38
Total length:			36:28

== Personnel ==
- Garth Brooks – lead and backing vocals, acoustic guitar

Additional musicians

- Bruce Bouton – pedal steel guitar
- Mark Casstevens – acoustic guitar
- Mike Chapman – bass guitar
- Kathy Chiavola – backing vocals on "Alabama Clay"
- Charles Cochran – string arrangements
- Rob Hajacos – fiddle
- Wendy Johnson – backing vocals on "I've Got A Good Thing Going", "If Tomorrow Never Comes" and "Everytime That It Rains"
- Chris Leuzinger – electric guitar
- The Nashville String Machine – string section
  - George Binkley III
  - John Borg
  - Roy Christiensen
  - Carl Gorodetzky
  - Dennis Molchan
  - Pamela Sixfin
  - Gary Vanosdale
- Jennifer O'Brien – backing vocals on "I've Got A Good Thing Going", "If Tomorrow Never Comes" and "Everytime That It Rains"
- Wayland Patton – backing vocals on "Alabama Clay"
- Milton Sledge – drums
- Hurshel Wiginton – backing vocals on "I've Got A Good Thing Going", "If Tomorrow Never Comes" and "Everytime That It Rains"
- Bobby Wood – keyboards, synthesizer
- Curtis Young – backing vocals on "I've Got A Good Thing Going", "If Tomorrow Never Comes" and "Everytime That It Rains"

Technical personnel

- Allen Reynolds – production
- Mark Miller – recording and mixing engineering
- Denny Purcell – mastering

== Charts ==
=== Weekly charts ===
Chart (1989–1992)	Peak position
Australian Albums (ARIA)	197
Canadian Albums (RPM)	60
Canadian Country Albums (RPM)	22
US Billboard 200	13
US Top Country Albums (Billboard)	2

=== Year-end charts ===
Chart (1989)	Position
US Top Country Albums (Billboard)	55
Chart (1990)	Position
US Billboard 200	98
US Top Country Albums (Billboard)	4
Chart (1991)	Position
US Billboard 200	34
US Top Country Albums (Billboard)	2
Chart (1992)	Position
US Billboard 200	27
US Top Country Albums (Billboard)	5
Chart (1993)	Position
US Billboard 200	96
US Top Country Albums (Billboard)	20
Chart (1994)	Position
US Top Country Albums (Billboard)	34

=== Singles ===
Year	Single	Peak chart positions		
Year	Single	US Country	CAN Country	UK
1989	"Much Too Young (To Feel This Damn Old)"	8	9	—
1989	"If Tomorrow Never Comes"	1	2	—
1990	"Not Counting You"	2	1	—
1990	"The Dance"	1	1	36

== Certifications ==
Region	Certification	Certified units/sales
United States (RIAA)	Diamond	10,000,000^{^}
^{^} Shipments figures based on certification alone.

== See also ==
- List of best-selling albums in the United States
