= She Believes in Me =

1979 single by Kenny Rogers

Single by Kenny Rogers

from the album The Gambler
- B-side: "Morgana Jones"
- Released: April 16, 1979
- Recorded: 1978
- Studio: Jack Clement Recording (Nashville, Tennessee)
- Genre: Country; pop
- Length: 4:18
- Label: United Artists
- Songwriter: Steve Gibb
- Producer: Larry Butler

Kenny Rogers singles chronology
"All I Ever Need Is You" (1979)	"She Believes in Me" (1979)	"'Til I Can Make It on My Own" (1979)

"She Believes in Me" is a song recorded by American country music singer Kenny Rogers. It was released in April 1979 as the second single from his 1978 album The Gambler. The song was written by American singer-songwriter Steve Gibb (not to be confused with Steve Gibb, son of Barry Gibb) who first released his version as a 7" single in 1978. A version by T. G. Sheppard appears on his 1978 album Daylight, released a month before Rogers' album.

== Content ==
The song is the tale of a struggling songwriter/performer who has a beloved who supports him, although he sometimes wonders why.

== Kenny Rogers version ==
"She Believes in Me" became one of his biggest crossover hits in the late spring of 1979, reaching number one on the Billboard Country Singles chart. "She Believes in Me" also peaked at number five on the Billboard Hot 100 pop singles chart, and number one on the Billboard Adult Contemporary chart. It was also a minor pop hit in the UK, reaching number 42.

Record World said that it is "romantic" and features "Roger's lusty and mature delivery."

The melody of the chorus also somewhat resembles the chorus of "Lost Without Your Love" by soft rock band Bread (released in 1976), with the chords and structure having some similar properties.

The song "Como Ama una Mujer" ("How a Woman Loves") by Jennifer Lopez, the title track of her fifth album, has a melodic chorus which was noted for being similar to the song.

=== Weekly charts ===
Chart (1979)	Peak position
Australian (Kent Music Report)	34
Canadian RPM Top Singles	8
Canadian RPM Country Tracks	1
Canadian RPM Adult Contemporary Tracks	1
New Zealand (Listener)	39
UK Singles (OCC)	42
US Hot Country Songs (Billboard)	1
US Billboard Hot 100	5
US Adult Contemporary (Billboard)	1
US Cash Box Top 100	7

=== Year-end charts ===
Chart (1979)	Rank
Canada Top Singles (RPM)	30
US Billboard Hot 100	47
US Adult Contemporary (Billboard)	11
US Hot Country Songs (Billboard)	6
US Cash Box	61

== Ronan Keating version ==
"She Believes (In Me)"

Single by Ronan Keating

from the album Turn It On
- Released: February 9, 2004
- Length: 4:04
- Label: Polydor
- Songwriter: Steve Gibb
- Producer: Mark Taylor

Ronan Keating singles chronology
"Lost for Words" (2003)	"She Believes (In Me)" (2004)	"Last Thing on My Mind" (2004)

Irish singer-songwriter Ronan Keating recorded a cover of "She Believes in Me", retitled "She Believes (In Me)", for his third studio album, Turn It On (2003). The song was released on February 9, 2004, peaking at number two on the UK Singles Chart. It was successful elsewhere, reaching the top 30 in Austria, Germany, and Ireland. Keating's version of the song slightly alters the lyrics from the original version.

=== Track listings ===
UK CD1

1. "She Believes (In Me)"
2. "Lovin' Each Day" (BBC Radio 2 Live Session)
3. "She Believes (In Me)" (Metro mix)
4. "First Time" (live acoustic session video)
5. "She Believes (In Me)" (video)

UK CD2

1. "She Believes (In Me)"
2. "If Tomorrow Never Comes"

UK DVD single

1. "She Believes (In Me)"
2. "First Time" (live acoustic session)
3. "She Believes (In Me)" (video)
4. "The Long Goodbye" (video)
5. The making of the video

=== Charts ===
==== Weekly charts ====
Chart (2004)	Peak position
Australia (ARIA)	33
Austria (Ö3 Austria Top 40)	30
Belgium (Ultratip Bubbling Under Flanders)	4
Belgium (Ultratip Bubbling Under Wallonia)	14
Europe (Eurochart Hot 100)	8
Germany (GfK)	22
Ireland (IRMA)	17
Netherlands (Single Top 100)	48
Romania (Romanian Top 100)	54
Scotland Singles (Official Charts)	3
Sweden (Sverigetopplistan)	53
UK Singles (Official Charts)	2
UK Airplay (Music Week)	17

==== Year-end charts ====
Chart (2004)	Position
UK Singles (OCC)	78

=== Release history ===
Region	Date	Format(s)	Label(s)	Ref.
Australia	February 9, 2004	CD	Polydor	
United Kingdom	February 9, 2004	CD; DVD	Polydor	

== Other versions ==
- In 1979, Johnny Mathis recorded for his album Mathis Magic
- Also in 1979, Dutch-speaking Belgian pop singer Will Tura sang a Dutch version of the song called "Zij gelooft in mij".
- In 1980, D.J. Rogers released his version on The Message Is Still the Same.
- Two years later, in 1981, Dutch singer André Hazes wrote another Dutch version of the song also called "Zij gelooft in mij". Although both songs bear the same name, the lyrics are completely different. It is also the title of an award-winning documentary by John Appel about André Hazes's life.
- Also in 1981, Welsh singer Tom Jones covered the song in a live performance at the Caesars Palace in Las Vegas.
- Icelandic singer Pálmi Gunnarsson recorded an Icelandic version of the song called "Hún hefur trú á mér", which appears on his 1980 album Hvers vegna varst' ekki kyrr?.
- Roger Whittaker covered it in his 1986 album "Best Loved Ballads"
- Punk rock cover band Me First and the Gimme Gimmes recorded a version of "She Believes in Me" for their 2006 album, Love Their Country.
- In 2011 Scotty McCreery performed this song on American Idol as his third number in the May 17 episode. It was chosen for him to sing by the judges.
- Around the same time, a Dutch female singer Dominique van Hulst, better known as 'Do', covered the song as "Hij gelooft in mij" (He believes in me).
- The song is also covered in Portuguese by Maria de Fátima.
- Spanish version sung by Spanish singer Dyango "Ella cree en mí".
- Australian singer Kamahl released the song on his 1979 album "She believes in me".
