= Not Counting You =

Single by Garth Brooks

from the album Garth Brooks
- B-side: "Cowboy Bill"
- Released: January 8, 1990
- Recorded: 1988
- Studio: Jack's Tracks (Nashville, Tennessee)
- Genre: Country
- Length: 2:34
- Label: Capitol Nashville 44492
- Songwriter: Garth Brooks
- Producer: Allen Reynolds

Garth Brooks singles chronology
| "If Tomorrow Never Comes" (1989) | "Not Counting You" (1990) | "The Dance" (1990) |

"Not Counting You" is a song written and recorded by American country music artist Garth Brooks. It was released in January 1990 as the third single from his album Garth Brooks. It peaked at #2 in the United States, while it was a number-one in Canada. According to "The Garth Brooks Story" TV special, this was the first song Brooks ever recorded.

== Content ==
The song is an up-tempo song accompanied largely by fiddles. The song's narrator tells his ex-lover that not counting her, no woman has ever made him so blue, nor made him feel bad in any way.

== Track listing ==
7" Jukebox single Liberty B-44492, 1990

1. "Not Counting You"
2. "Cowboy Bill"

7" promotional single Liberty P-B-44492, 1990

1. "Not Counting You"
2. "Not Counting You"

== Chart positions ==
"Not Counting You" debuted the country charts on January 20, 1990, and peaked at number 2 on April 7 of that year.

| Chart (1990) | Peak position |
|---|---|
| Canada Country Singles (RPM) | 1 |
| US Hot Country Songs (Billboard) | 2 |

=== Year-end charts ===
| Chart (1990) | Position |
|---|---|
| Canada Country Tracks (RPM) | 29 |
| US Country Songs (Billboard) | 20 |
