= Lost for Words (Ronan Keating song) =

2003 single by Ronan Keating

Single by Ronan Keating

from the album Turn It On
- Released: 10 November 2003
- Length: 3:41
- Label: Polydor
- Songwriter(s): Wayne Hector, Ronan Keating
- Producer(s): David Frank

Ronan Keating singles chronology
"The Long Goodbye" (2003)	"Lost for Words" (2003)	"She Believes (In Me)" (2004)

"Lost for Words" is the first single released from Irish singer-songwriter Ronan Keating's third studio album, Turn It On (2003). The song was written by Keating, Wayne Hector, and David Frank and was released on 10 November 2003. "Lost for Words" peaked at number nine on the UK Singles Chart.

== Track listings ==
UK CD1

1. "Lost for Words" – 3:41
2. "I Couldn't Love You More" – 4:07
3. "Lost for Words" (Robbie Rivera vocal mix) – 6:05
4. "Lost for Words" (video) – 3:45

UK CD2

1. "Lost for Words" – 3:41
2. "It Was You" – 2:44
3. "Lost For Words" (acoustic version) – 3:35
