= In This Life (Collin Raye song) =

1992 single by Collin Raye

Single by Collin Raye

from the album In This Life
- B-side: "Blue Magic"
- Released: July 27, 1992
- Studio: Sound Emporium (Nashville, Tennessee)
- Genre: Country
- Length: 3:13
- Label: Epic
- Songwriters: Mike Reid, Allen Shamblin
- Producers: Garth Fundis, John Hobbs

Collin Raye singles chronology
"Every Second" (1992)	"In This Life" (1992)	"I Want You Bad (And That Ain't Good)" (1992)

"In This Life" is a song written by Mike Reid and Allen Shamblin, and recorded by American country music singer Collin Raye that reached the top of the Billboard Hot Country Singles & Tracks chart. It was released in July 1992 as the first single and title track from his CD In This Life.

== Critical reception ==
Deborah Evans Price, of Billboard magazine reviewed the song favorably, saying that the "control, emotion, and integrity with which Raye delivers such tender material is seldom achieved."

== Chart performance ==
The song debuted at No. 58 on the Hot Country Singles & Tracks chart dated August 1, 1992. It charted for 20 weeks on that chart, and became his second Number One single on the chart dated October 3, 1992, where it remained for two weeks. It also peaked at No. 21 on the Adult Contemporary chart.

=== Charts ===
Chart (1992)	Peak position
Canada Country Singles (RPM)	1
US Adult Contemporary (Billboard)	21
US Hot Country Songs (Billboard)	1

=== Year-end charts ===
Chart (1992)	Position
Canada Country Tracks (RPM)	43
US Country Songs (Billboard)	22

== Cover versions ==
The song appears on the album One Careful Owner by Michael Ball. The song appears on the album Now's the Time (4 P.M. album) by the group 4 P.M. Bette Midler recorded the song for her album Bette of Roses. The song appears on the 1996 album N Dis Life by Hawaiian singer Israel Kamakawiwoʻole. Amy Hanaiali'i covered it again in her 2008 album, Aumakua. In 2005, Irish pop band Westlife recorded and included the song on their album, Face to Face.

== Ronan Keating version ==
"In This Life"

Single by Ronan Keating

from the album Ronan
- Released: 24 November 1999 (as digital download); 2 December 2000 (as single)
- Recorded: 1999–2000
- Genre: Pop
- Length: 3:10
- Label: Polydor
- Songwriters: Mike Reid, Allen Shamblin
- Producer: Stephen Lipson

Ronan Keating singles chronology
"The Way You Make Me Feel" (2000)	"In This Life" (1999)	"Lovin' Each Day" (2001)

Irish singer Ronan Keating covered the song for his debut solo album Ronan, released in 2000. As part of a Pepsi promotion, a 3" CD single of "In This Life" was issued in December 2000 exclusively in Tesco stores. The song failed to chart due to its ineligibility, as 3" singles are not able to chart. On October 17, 2009, Keating performed the song at the funeral of his bandmate Stephen Gately, and as such, the track entered the Irish Singles Chart at number 45 for the week of October 22, 2009.

=== Track listing ===
1. "In This Life" - 3:10
2. "Exclusive Ronan Interview" - 10:00
3. "CD-Rom Footage"

== Westlife version ==
Irish boyband Westlife sang a version of the song on their 2005 album Face to Face.
