= Destination (Ronan Keating album) =

Studio album by Ronan Keating
- Released: 20 May 2002
- Studio: Fredonia International, Los Angeles; Britannia Row, London; Battery, London; Soul II Soul, London; Windmill Lane, Dublin; Wise Buddah Music, London
- Genre: Pop
- Length: 54:48
- Label: Polydor
- Producer: Bill Padley; Calum MacColl; Gregg Alexander; Jem Godfrey; Liam Bradley; Rick Nowels; Steve Mac

Ronan Keating chronology
Ronan (2000)	Destination (2002)	Turn It On (2003)

Singles from Destination
- 1. "If Tomorrow Never Comes" Released: 29 April 2002; 2. "I Love It When We Do" Released: 9 September 2002; 3. "We've Got Tonight" Released: 25 November 2002; 4. "The Long Goodbye" Released: 28 April 2003

Destination is the second studio album from Irish singer-songwriter Ronan Keating. It was released by Polydor Records on 20 May 2002. The album debuted at number one on the UK Albums Chart and was certified two-times platinum by the British Phonographic Industry. In Ireland, the album debuted at number three. Additionally, the album charted within the top ten of nine other European countries. In 2002, Destination was certified platinum by the International Federation of the Phonographic Industry for shipments of one million copies inside Europe. The album includes the singles "If Tomorrow Never Comes", "I Love It When We Do", "We've Got Tonight", and "The Long Goodbye", all of which peaked inside the top ten of the UK Singles Chart.

Professional ratings
Review scores
Source	Rating
AllMusic	3.5/5 stars
Entertainment.ie	2/5 stars
MTV Asia	7/10

== Track listing ==
All tracks written and produced by Gregg Alexander and Rick Nowels, except where noted.

No.	Title	Writer(s)	Producer(s)	Length
1.	"I Love It When We Do"			3:53
2.	"Love Won't Work (If We Don't Try)"			3:44
3.	"If Tomorrow Never Comes"	Garth Brooks, Kent Blazy	Steve Mac	3:35
4.	"Come Be My Baby"			3:53
5.	"Lovin' Each Day"		Alexander	3:33
6.	"My One Thing That's Real"			3:35
7.	"Time for Love"			3:39
8.	"Blown Away"			3:39
9.	"As Much As I Can Give You Girl"			4:15
10.	"Pickin' Me Up"	Alexander, Nowels, Ronan Keating		4:42
11.	"Joy and Pain"	Jeremy Godfrey, Bill Padley, Keating	Jem Godfrey, Bill Padley	3:49
12.	"We've Got Tonight" (featuring Lulu)	Bob Seger	Bill Padley	3:39
13.	"The Long Goodbye"	Paul Brady, Keating	Liam Bradley, Calum McColl	4:43

UK bonus track
No.	Title	Writer(s)	Producer(s)	Length
14.	"I Got My Heart on You"	Alexander	Alexander	3:47

German alternative track
No.	Title	Writer(s)	Producer(s)	Length
12.	"We've Got Tonight" (featuring Jeanette)	Bob Seger	Bill Padley	3:39

French alternative track
No.	Title	Length
1.	"Je T'aime Plus Que Tout (I Love It When We Do)" (featuring Cécilia Cara)	3:39

South American edition
No.	Title	Writer(s)	Producer(s)	Length
1.	"I Love It When We Do"			3:53
2.	"Love Won't Work (If We Don't Try)"			3:44
3.	"If Tomorrow Never Comes"	Garth Brooks, Kent Blazy	Steve Mac	3:35
4.	"Come Be My Baby"			3:53
5.	"Lovin' Each Day"		Alexander	3:33
6.	"My One Thing That's Real"			3:35
7.	"Time for Love"			3:39
8.	"Life Is a Rollercoaster"			3:51
9.	"As Much as I Can Give You, Girl"			4:15
10.	"The Way You Make Me Feel"	Bryan Adams, Phil Thornalley	Phil Thornalley	3:54
11.	"When You Say Nothing at All" (featuring Paulina Rubio)	Paul Overstreet, Don Schlitz	Stephen Lipson	4:42
12.	"We've Got Tonight" (featuring Lulu)	Bob Seger	Bill Padley	3:39
13.	"The Long Goodbye"	Paul Brady, Keating	Liam Bradley, Calum McColl	4:43

== Personnel ==
- Tracie Ackerman – backing vocals
- Gregg Alexander – producer, project coordinator
- Rusty Anderson – electric guitar, bazouki
- Dave Arch – piano, string arrangements
- Liam Bradley – percussion, drums, backing vocals, producer
- Maire Breatnach – violin
- Danielle Brisebois – backing vocals
- Alex Brown – backing vocals
- Chris Brown – engineer
- Sue Ann Carwell – backing vocals
- Ed Colman – engineer
- Dave Dale – engineer
- Corinne Day – photography
- Graham Dominy – assistant engineer
- Aiden Foley – assistant engineer
- Denny Fongheiser – percussion, cymbals, tom-tom
- Daniel Frampton – mixing
- Angie Giles – backing vocals
- Jem Godfrey – producer
- Eddie Hession – accordion, accordion arranger
- Ash Howes – mixing
- Rob Jacobs – engineer
- Charles Judge – piano, keyboards, engineer, digital editing, sound design, pro-tools
- Kieran Kiely – piano, organ (hammond)
- Greg Kurstin – keyboards
- Tim Lambert – assistant engineer
- Chris Laws – drums, engineer
- Steve Lee – backing vocals
- Bob Ludwig – mastering
- Lulu – vocals
- Steve Mac – arranger, keyboards, producer, mixing
- Calum MacColl – guitar, backing vocals, producer
- Avril MacKintosh – producer, engineer, digital editing, remixing, vocal producer, pro-tools
- Tony Matthew – assistant engineer
- Alastair McMillan – engineer
- James McNally – piano, bodhran
- Kieron Menzies – assistant engineer
- Crystal Murden – backing vocals
- Yoad Nevo – programming
- Rick Nowels – acoustic guitar, piano, keyboards, backing vocals, producer, mellotron, wurlitzer
- Bill Padley – arranger, backing vocals, multi instruments, producer, musician
- Pino Palladino – bass, bass guitar
- Steve Pearce – bass guitar
- John Pierce – bass
- Tim Pierce – electric guitar
- Daniel Pursey – assistant engineer
- Wayne Rodrigues – drums, keyboards, digital editing, drum programming
- Philip Rose – assistant engineer
- Alfie Silas – backing vocals
- Jess Sutcliffe – engineer
- Shari Sutcliffe – project coordinator
- John Themis – guitar, percussion, bazouki
- Julie Thompson – backing vocals
- Paul Turner – bass, guitar
- Alan Veucasovic – assistant engineer
- Dan Vickers – assistant engineer
- Dave Way – mixing
- Jeremy Wheatley – mixing
- Randy Wine – engineer
- Tim Young – mastering, mastering engineer

== Charts ==
=== Weekly charts ===
Chart (2002)	Peak position
Australian Albums (ARIA)	3
Austrian Albums (Ö3 Austria)	2
Belgian Albums (Ultratop Flanders)	9
Danish Albums (Hitlisten)	8
Dutch Albums (Album Top 100)	4
European Top 100 Albums (Music & Media)	2
Finnish Albums (Suomen virallinen lista)	16
French Albums (SNEP)	37
German Albums (Offizielle Top 100)	1
Irish Albums (IRMA)	3
Italian Albums (FIMI)	37
New Zealand Albums (RMNZ)	1
Norwegian Albums (VG-lista)	2
Scottish Albums (OCC)	1
Swedish Albums (Sverigetopplistan)	5
Swiss Albums (Schweizer Hitparade)	3
UK Albums (OCC)	1

=== Year-end charts ===
Chart (2002)	Position
Australian Albums (ARIA)	20
Austrian Albums (Ö3 Austria)	60
Belgian Albums (Ultratop Flanders)	64
Dutch Albums (Album Top 100)	29
German Albums (Offizielle Top 100)	25
Swedish Albums (Sverigetopplistan)	84
Swiss Albums (Schweizer Hitparade)	44
UK Albums (OCC)	23

== Certifications ==
Certifications for Destination
Region	Certification	Certified units/sales
Australia (ARIA)	2× Platinum	140,000^{^}
Denmark (IFPI Danmark)	Gold	25,000^{^}
France (SNEP)	Gold	100,000^{*}
Germany (BVMI)	Gold	150,000^{^}
Netherlands (NVPI)	Gold	40,000^{^}
New Zealand (RMNZ)	Platinum	15,000^{^}
Norway (IFPI Norway)	Platinum	40,000^{*}
Sweden (GLF)	Gold	30,000^{^}
Switzerland (IFPI Switzerland)	Platinum	40,000^{^}
United Kingdom (BPI)	2× Platinum	600,000^{^}
Summaries
Europe (IFPI)	Platinum	1,000,000^{*}
^{*} Sales figures based on certification alone.^{^} Shipments figures based on certification alone.
