= The Way You Make Me Feel (Ronan Keating song) =

2000 single by Ronan Keating

Single by Ronan Keating

from the album Ronan
- B-side: "Song To..."; "Fairytale of New York"; "In Love, There Is No Pride"
- Released: 20 November 2000
- Studio: Swamp (London, England)
- Length: 3:53 (album version); 3.38 (single mix)
- Label: Polydor
- Songwriters: Phil Thornalley; Bryan Adams
- Producer: Phil Thornalley

Ronan Keating singles chronology
"Life Is a Rollercoaster" (2000)	"The Way You Make Me Feel" (2000)	"In This Life" (2000)

"The Way You Make Me Feel" is a song by Irish singer-songwriter Ronan Keating from his debut solo album, Ronan. The song was written by English songwriter Phil Thornalley and Canadian singer-songwriter Bryan Adams, who both provide backing vocals on the track. It was released as the third single from Ronan on 20 November 2000 and peaked at number six on the UK Singles Chart. In 2004, the song was re-recorded for Keating's greatest hits album, 10 Years of Hits, featuring vocals from Adams.

== Track listings ==
- UK and Australian CD1; Japanese CD single
1. "The Way You Make Me Feel" (single mix)
2. "Song To..."
3. "Fairytale of New York" (featuring Máire Brennan)
4. "Once Upon a Lifetime"
- UK and Australian CD2
1. "The Way You Make Me Feel" (single mix)
2. "The Way You Make Me Feel" (Euro mix)
3. "In Love, There Is No Pride"
4. "Life Is a Rollercoaster" (alternate acoustic version)
- UK cassette single

A. "The Way You Make Me Feel" (single mix)
B. "Song To..."

- European CD single
1. "The Way You Make Me Feel" (single mix)
2. "The Way You Make Me Feel" (Euro mix)

== Credits and personnel ==
Credits are taken from the Ronan album booklet.

Studios

- Recorded at Swamp Studios (London, England)
- Mastered at 777 Productions (London, England)

Personnel

- Phil Thornalley – writing, backing vocals, guitars, bass guitar, piano, keyboards, synthesizers, production, mixing
- Bryan Adams – writing, backing vocals
- Dave Munday – guitars, flute
- Chuck Sabo – drums, percussion
- Arun Chakraverty – mastering

== Charts ==
=== Weekly charts ===
Chart (2000–2001)	Peak position
Australia (ARIA)	27
Belgium (Ultratip Bubbling Under Flanders)	2
Europe (Eurochart Hot 100)	26
Germany (GfK)	65
Ireland (IRMA)	8
Italy (FIMI)	50
Netherlands (Dutch Top 40 Tipparade)	4
Netherlands (Single Top 100)	69
New Zealand (Recorded Music NZ)	8
Poland Airplay (Music & Media)	9
Scottish Singles Sales (Official Charts)	5
Switzerland (Schweizer Hitparade)	52
UK Singles (Official Charts)	6
UK Airplay (Music Week)	7

=== Year-end charts ===
Chart (2000)	Position
UK Singles (OCC)	157

== Release history ==
Region	Date	Format(s)	Label(s)	Ref.
United Kingdom	20 November 2000	CD; cassette	Polydor	
Japan	6 December 2000	CD	Polydor	
