= Lovin' Each Day =

2001 single by Ronan Keating

Single by Ronan Keating

from the album Ronan (re-release) and Destination
- B-side: "Starlight"; "Somedays"
- Released: 9 April 2001
- Studio: Soul II Soul, PWL (London, England)
- Length: 3:33
- Label: Polydor
- Songwriters: Gregg Alexander; Rick Nowels
- Producers: Gregg Alexander; Rick Nowels

Ronan Keating singles chronology
"In This Life" (2000)	"Lovin' Each Day" (2001)	"If Tomorrow Never Comes" (2002)

Music video
- "Lovin' Each Day" on YouTube

"Lovin' Each Day" is the fourth and final single released from Irish singer-songwriter Ronan Keating's debut solo album, Ronan (2000). The song was written by Gregg Alexander and Rick Nowels and was included only on the re-release of the album before appearing on Keating's second album, Destination (2002). The single was released on 9 April 2001 in Australia and on 16 April in Ireland and the United Kingdom.

Commercially, "Lovin' Each Day" peaked at number one in Scotland, at number two on the UK Singles Chart, and within the top 10 in Canada, Denmark, Ireland, Italy, New Zealand and Portugal. It was Keating's first song to appear on a US Billboard chart, peaking at number 32 on the Adult Top 40. Sales of the song increased when it was used as the theme for Sky Sports' Ford Super Sunday coverage in 2001, and the song received a gold certification from the British Phonographic Industry (BPI) in 2023.

== Track listings ==
UK CD1

1. "Lovin' Each Day"
2. "Starlight"
3. Interview with Ronan part 1

UK CD2

1. "Lovin' Each Day"
2. "Somedays"
3. Interview with Ronan part 2

UK cassette single

1. "Lovin' Each Day"
2. "Lovin' Each Day" (Almighty mix)

European CD single

1. "Lovin' Each Day"
2. "Starlight"

Australian CD1

1. "Lovin' Each Day"
2. "Starlight"
3. "Feel"
4. "The Way You Make Me Feel" (CD-ROM video)

Australian CD2

1. "Lovin' Each Day"
2. "Somedays"
3. "Even If I'm Gone"

US CD single

1. "Lovin' Each Day" – 3:32
2. "When You Say Nothing at All" – 4:18

== Credits and personnel ==
Credits are adapted from the UK CD1 liner notes.

Studios

- Recorded at Soul II Soul Studios and PWL Studios (London, England)
- Mixed at Larrabee Studios (Hollywood, California, US)
- Mastered at Gateway Mastering (Portland, Maine, US)

Personnel

- Gregg Alexander – writing, production
- Rick Nowels – writing, backing vocals, piano, keyboards, production
- Ronan Keating – vocals
- Danielle Brisebois – backing vocals
- Sue Ann Carwell – backing vocals
- Alex Brown – backing vocals
- Alfie Silas – backing vocals
- Rusty Anderson – guitars
- John Pierce – bass
- Wayne Rodrigues – drums
- Charles Judge – piano, keyboards
- Dave Way – mixing
- Ed Colman – engineering
- Moe El-Khamlichi
- Chris Brown – engineering
- Randy Wine – engineering
- Bob Ludwig – mastering
- Frost Design – artwork design
- Bernhard Kühmstedt – photography

== Charts ==
=== Weekly charts ===
Chart (2001)	Peak position
Australia (ARIA)	21
Austria (Ö3 Austria Top 40)	26
Belgium (Ultratop 50 Flanders)	39
Belgium (Ultratip Bubbling Under Wallonia)	10
Canada (Nielsen SoundScan)	3
Denmark (Tracklisten)	6
Europe (Eurochart Hot 100)	6
France (SNEP)	56
Germany (GfK)	14
Ireland (IRMA)	4
Italy (FIMI)	8
Netherlands (Dutch Top 40)	23
Netherlands (Single Top 100)	29
New Zealand (Recorded Music NZ)	9
Poland Airplay (Music & Media)	3
Portugal (AFP)	9
Scottish Singles Sales (Official Charts)	1
Sweden (Sverigetopplistan)	16
Switzerland (Schweizer Hitparade)	26
UK Singles (Official Charts)	2
UK Airplay (Music Week)	2
US Adult Pop Airplay (Billboard)	32

=== Year-end charts ===
Chart (2001)	Position
Australia (ARIA)	100
Canada (Nielsen SoundScan)	47
Ireland (IRMA)	65
New Zealand (RIANZ)	26
UK Singles (OCC)	53
UK Airplay (Music Week)	41

== Certifications ==
Region	Certification	Certified units/sales
New Zealand (RMNZ)	Gold	15,000^{‡}
United Kingdom (BPI)	Gold	400,000^{‡}
^{‡} Sales+streaming figures based on certification alone.

== Release history ==
Region	Date	Format(s)	Label(s)	Ref.
Australia	9 April 2001	CD	Polydor	
Ireland	16 April 2001	CD; cassette	Polydor	
United Kingdom	16 April 2001	CD; cassette	Polydor	
United States	22 May 2001	Contemporary hit radio	A&M	
United States	25 June 2001	Hot adult contemporary radio	A&M	
