= Ronan (album) =

Studio album by Ronan Keating
- Released: 31 July 2000
- Studio: Hollywood, California; London, England; Nashville, Tennessee; Burbank, California
- Genre: Pop
- Length: 52:57
- Label: Polydor
- Producer: Anders Bagge; Arnthor Birgisson; Gregg Alexander; Patrick Leonard; Phil Thornalley; Rick Nowels; Stephen Lipson; Steve Mac

Ronan Keating chronology
Ronan (2000)	Destination (2002)

Singles from Ronan
- 1. "When You Say Nothing at All" Released: 26 July 1999; 2. "Life Is a Rollercoaster" Released: 10 July 2000; 3. "The Way You Make Me Feel" Released: 20 November 2000; 4. "In This Life" Released: 2 December 2000; 5. "Lovin' Each Day" Released: 16 April 2001

Ronan is the self-titled debut solo album by Irish singer-songwriter and Boyzone frontman, Ronan Keating. It was released by Polydor Records on 31 July 2000, and became a commercial success.

The album produced four UK and Irish top-ten singles: "When You Say Nothing at All", originally recorded for the soundtrack of the 1999 film Notting Hill, "Life Is a Rollercoaster", "The Way You Make Me Feel", and "Lovin' Each Day", the latter of which was featured on the re-release edition of the album, and later on Keating's second album, Destination.

== Critical reception ==
Professional ratings
Review scores
Source	Rating
AllMusic	2.5/5 stars
Entertainment.ie	2/5 stars
The Independent	2/5 stars
MTV Asia	6/10
Yahoo! Music UK	2/10

Ronan earned mixed to negative reviews from music critics. AllMusic editor Peter Fawthrop concluded: "For an album as seeping with heartfelt ballads as Ronan is, it is amazing that so many known artists came together with tunes that are so alike they sound monotonous. It really takes a few listens to bond with Ronan, because it is so slow. It is slow but it is also soft and tender. At certain moments it is exceptionally emotional." Entertainment.ie felt that the upside of the album was "that everything here feels ultra-smooth and polished; the downside that it comes across as if designed by a committee determined to take no chances. Keating's husky voice works well enough on the punchy pop numbers but the album is weighed down by far too many maudlin ballads." Bruce Fletcher from Yahoo! Music UK found that the album's standout track "Life Is a Rollercoaster" was underlining "the point that when, as in this case, [Keating] sings uptempo, unpretentious pop songs Ronan is often worth a listen. As soon as he begins to get all mature and world weary on us however, it is definitely time to reach for the ear plugs."

== Commercial performance ==
Ronan sold over 750,000 copies and became one of the top selling albums of the year in the United Kingdom. It debuted at number one on the UK Albums Chart, and has been certified four-times platinum by the British Phonographic Industry for sales of 1.2 million copies. In the singer's native Ireland, the album debuted at number two. The album also became a commercial success in other European countries, where it charted within the top ten of eight countries. In 2001, Ronan was certified two-times platinum by the International Federation of the Phonographic Industry for shipments of two million copies inside Europe.

== Track listing ==
No.	Title	Writer(s)	Producer(s)	Length
1.	"Life Is a Rollercoaster"	Gregg Alexander, Rick Nowels	Alexander, Nowels	3:56
2.	"The Way You Make Me Feel"	Phil Thornalley, Bryan Adams	Thornalley	3:54
3.	"In This Life"	Mike Reid, Allen Shamblin	Stephen Lipson	3:10
4.	"Heal Me"	Alexander, Nowels	Alexander, Nowels	4:05
5.	"Keep on Walking"	Ronan Keating, Patrick Leonard, Robin Thicke	Leonard	3:56
6.	"When You Say Nothing at All"	Paul Overstreet, Don Schlitz	Lipson	4:18
7.	"Brighter Days"	Gordon Chambers, Andy Hill	Lipson	4:55
8.	"If You Love Me"	Gary Baker, Steve Diamond, Keating, Lipson	Lipson	3:27
9.	"If I Don't Tell You Now"	Diane Warren	Steve Mac	3:20
10.	"Only for You"	Anders Bagge, Arnthor Birgisson, Paul Tucker	Bag & Arnthor	4:29
11.	"Addicted"	Wayne Hector, Michael Power, Lipson	Lipson	5:25
12.	"When the World Was Mine"	Billy Livsey, Wayland Holyfield	Lipson	5:18
13.	"Believe"	Keating, Leonard	Leonard	5:04

UK bonus track
No.	Title	Writer(s)	Producer(s)	Length
14.	"Once Upon a Lifetime"	Baker, Frank J. Myers	Lipson	4:00

Re-issue bonus track
No.	Title	Writer(s)	Producer(s)	Length
14.	"Lovin' Each Day"	Alexander, Nowels	Alexander, Nowels	3:29

Turkish Platinum Edition bonus tracks
No.	Title	Length
14.	"This Is Your Song"	3:45
15.	"At The End of a Perfect Day"	4:30
16.	"I Will Miss You"	4:03
17.	"Since 13"	3:48
18.	"You"	3:56
19.	"Thank God I Kissed You"	3:57

== Charts ==
=== Weekly charts ===
Chart (2000–01)	Peak position
Australian Albums (ARIA)	5
Austrian Albums (Ö3 Austria)	10
Belgian Albums (Ultratop Flanders)	15
Danish Albums (IFPI)	1
Dutch Albums (Album Top 100)	8
European Top 100 Albums (Music & Media)	2
Finnish Albums (Suomen virallinen lista)	5
German Albums (Offizielle Top 100)	2
Hungarian Albums (MAHASZ)	27
Irish Albums (IRMA)	2
Italian Albums (FIMI)	13
New Zealand Albums (RMNZ)	2
Norwegian Albums (VG-lista)	1
Swedish Albums (Sverigetopplistan)	3
Swiss Albums (Schweizer Hitparade)	4
UK Albums (OCC)	1

=== Year-end ===
Chart (2000)	Position
Australian Albums (ARIA)	31
Danish Albums (Hitlisten)	42
European Albums (Music & Media)	28
German Albums (Offizielle Top 100)	52
New Zealand Albums (RMNZ)	29
Swedish Albums (Sverigetopplistan)	88
Swiss Albums (Schweizer Hitparade)	34
UK Albums (OCC)	12

Chart (2001)	Position
Australian Albums (ARIA)	19
European Albums (Music & Media)	99
German Albums (Offizielle Top 100)	75
UK Albums (OCC)	70

== Certifications ==
Certifications for "Ronan"
Region	Certification	Certified units/sales
Australia (ARIA)	3× Platinum	210,000^{^}
Denmark (IFPI Danmark)	Gold	25,000^{^}
Finland (Musiikkituottajat)	Gold	27,059
New Zealand (RMNZ)	2× Platinum	30,000^{^}
Norway (IFPI Norway)	Platinum	50,000^{*}
Switzerland (IFPI Switzerland)	Gold	25,000^{^}
United Kingdom (BPI)	4× Platinum	1,200,000^{^}
Summaries
Europe (IFPI)	2× Platinum	2,000,000^{*}
^{*} Sales figures based on certification alone.^{^} Shipments figures based on certification alone.
