= Life Is a Rollercoaster =

2000 single by Ronan Keating

Single by Ronan Keating

from the album Ronan
- B-side: "Since 13"; "You"; "Thank God I Kissed You"
- Released: 10 July 2000
- Studio: Fredonia International, Track Record (Hollywood, California)
- Genre: Pop rock
- Length: 3:56
- Label: Polydor
- Songwriters: Gregg Alexander; Rick Nowels
- Producers: Gregg Alexander; Rick Nowels

Ronan Keating singles chronology
"These Days" (1999)	"Life Is a Rollercoaster" (2000)	"The Way You Make Me Feel" (2000)

Music video
- "Life Is a Rollercoaster" on YouTube

"Life Is a Rollercoaster" is a song by Irish singer-songwriter Ronan Keating from his debut solo album, Ronan (2000). The song was written and produced by New Radicals frontman Gregg Alexander, and Rick Nowels, having originally been intended for the second New Radicals album which never came to fruition due to Alexander's decision to break up the band.

"Life Is a Rollercoaster" was released on 10 July 2000 in the United Kingdom. The song debuted at number one in the UK and Ireland, becoming Keating's second number-one single in both countries. In the UK, where the song was subject to a charting controversy, it became the 22nd-biggest-selling single of the year, and it has been certified platinum by the British Phonographic Industry (BPI) for sales and streams exceeding 600,000 units. Worldwide, "Life Is a Rollercoaster" topped the music charts of the Czech Republic, Denmark, and Iceland and peaked within the top 10 in nine other countries.

Following Keating's 31 December 2025 BBC One New Year's Eve special, Ronan Keating and Friends: A New Year's Eve Party, "Life Is a Rollercoaster" debuted at number 79 on the UK Singles Downloads Chart on 2 January 2026.

== Release and controversy ==
In the United Kingdom, Polydor Records released "Life Is a Rollercoaster" on 10 July 2000 across three formats: an enhanced CD single, a limited-edition CD single, and a cassette single. The original version of the enhanced CD contains two B-sides—"Since 13" and "You"—as well as a CD-ROM interview with Ronan Keating. This caused an issue when the Chart Supervisory Committee (CSC) ruled the format ineligible to chart, discarding about 100,000 copies of the single that had already been sold.

Under the previous chart regulations, the enhanced section of a CD had to contain an enhanced version of an audio track that was on the same disc, to which CD1 of "Life Is a Rollercoaster" did not comply. As a result, more pressings of the limited-edition CD were created while a new enhanced CD was rush-released. This incident caused the CSC to add new rules regarding multimedia formats, which came into effect in late August 2000. On its second week of release, the ineligible CD sold about 14,000 more copies during the first half of the week, which would have given "Life Is a Rollercoaster" a second week at number one on the UK Singles Chart.

== Track listings ==
UK CD1 (original) and Japanese CD single

1. "Life Is a Rollercoaster" (radio edit)
2. "Since 13"
3. "You" (radio edit)
4. Interview (CD-ROM)

UK CD1 (re-issue) and Australian CD single

1. "Life Is a Rollercoaster" (radio edit)
2. "Life Is a Rollercoaster" (instrumental version)
3. "Thank God I Kissed You"
4. "When You Say Nothing at All" (acoustic version)
5. "Life Is a Rollercoaster" (CD-ROM video)

UK CD2

1. "Life Is a Rollercoaster" (radio edit)
2. "Life Is a Rollercoaster" (karaoke version)
3. "Thank God I Kissed You"

UK 7-inch and cassette single

1. "Life Is a Rollercoaster" (radio edit)
2. "Since 13"

== Credits and personnel ==
Credits are taken from the Ronan album booklet.

Studios

- Recorded at Fredonia International Studios and Track Record (Hollywood, California)
- Mixed at Larrabee Studios (West Hollywood, California)
- Mastered at 777 Productions (London, England)

Personnel

- Gregg Alexander – writing, production
- Rick Nowels – writing, backing vocals, piano, keyboards, synthesizers, production
- Danielle Brisebois – backing vocals, Pro Tools editing
- Yvonne Williams – backing vocals
- Jackie Smiley – backing vocals
- Sue Ann Carwell – backing vocals
- Rusty Anderson – guitars
- John Pierce – bass guitar
- Charles Judge – piano, keyboards, synthesizers
- Free – Pro Tools editing
- Paula J. Jones – recording
- Randy Wine – recording
- Dave Way – mixing
- Wayne Rodrigues – programming
- Colleen Donahue-Reynolds – production coordination
- Arun Chakraverty – mastering

== Charts ==
=== Weekly charts ===
Chart (2000)	Peak position
Australia (ARIA)	6
Austria (Ö3 Austria Top 40)	13
Belgium (Ultratop 50 Flanders)	24
Belgium (Ultratip Bubbling Under Wallonia)	3
Czech Republic (IFPI)	1
Denmark (IFPI)	1
Estonia (Eesti Top 20)	6
Europe (Eurochart Hot 100)	10
Finland (Suomen virallinen lista)	16
France (SNEP)	69
Germany (GfK)	10
Iceland (Íslenski listinn Topp 40)	1
Ireland (IRMA)	1
Italy (FIMI)	7
Italy Airplay (Music & Media)	5
Netherlands (Dutch Top 40)	7
Netherlands (Single Top 100)	14
New Zealand (Recorded Music NZ)	2
Norway (VG-lista)	2
Poland Airplay (Music & Media)	1
Portugal (AFP)	3
Scottish Singles Sales (Official Charts)	1
Spain (Promusicae)	5
Sweden (Sverigetopplistan)	2
Switzerland (Schweizer Hitparade)	11
UK Singles (Official Charts)	1
UK Airplay (Music Week)	1

Chart (2026)	Peak position
UK Singles Downloads (OCC)	79

=== Year-end charts ===
Chart (2000)	Position
Australia (ARIA)	50
Denmark (IFPI)	16
Europe (Eurochart Hot 100)	52
Germany (Media Control)	59
Iceland (Íslenski Listinn Topp 40)	56
Ireland (IRMA)	24
Netherlands (Dutch Top 40)	87
New Zealand (RIANZ)	4
Sweden (Hitlistan)	57
Switzerland (Schweizer Hitparade)	72
Taiwan (Hito Radio)	30
UK Singles (OCC)	22
UK Airplay (Music Week)	10

== Certifications ==
Region	Certification	Certified units/sales
Australia (ARIA)	Gold	35,000^{^}
Denmark (IFPI Danmark)	Gold	45,000^{‡}
New Zealand (RMNZ)	Gold	15,000^{‡}
Norway (IFPI Norway)	Gold	
Sweden (GLF)	Gold	15,000^{^}
United Kingdom (BPI)	Platinum	600,000^{‡}
^{^} Shipments figures based on certification alone.^{‡} Sales+streaming figures based on certification alone.

== Release history ==
Region	Date	Format(s)	Label(s)	Ref.
United Kingdom	10 July 2000	CD; cassette	Polydor	
Japan	25 October 2000	CD	Polydor	
