= If Tomorrow Never Comes =

1989 single by Garth Brooks

Single by Garth Brooks

from the album Garth Brooks
- B-side: "Much Too Young (To Feel This Damn Old)"
- Released: August 21, 1989
- Studio: Jack's Tracks (Nashville, Tennessee)
- Genre: Country; soft rock
- Length: 3:39
- Label: Capitol Nashville
- Songwriters: Garth Brooks; Kent Blazy
- Producer: Allen Reynolds

Garth Brooks singles chronology
| "Much Too Young (To Feel This Damn Old)" (1989) | "If Tomorrow Never Comes" (1989) | "Not Counting You" (1990) |

"If Tomorrow Never Comes" is a song by American country music artist Garth Brooks. Written by Garth Brooks and Kent Blazy, it was released in August 1989 as the second single from his self-titled debut album. The track was his first number-one single on the US Billboard Hot Country Singles chart, and Garth refers to it as his signature song. "If Tomorrow Never Comes" was named Favorite Country Single in the American Music Awards of 1991.

The song subsequently became one of Brooks' most popular songs for other artists to cover. In 2002, Irish singer Ronan Keating released a version that reached number one in the United Kingdom and three other countries, and it became a top-five hit in several additional territories.

== Content ==
This is the first country love song released by Garth Brooks. A man lies awake at night, thinking what would happen in his love's mind if he were to die the next day. The first line in the chorus reads: "If tomorrow never comes, will she know how much I love her?" He goes on to compare this situation with his own lost loved ones, and how he made a promise to say each day how much she means to him. The song begins with a soft guitar solo and gradually builds up to a more orchestrated accompaniment. Garth has written many love songs since. This song is about the love of a father to his daughter, not to his lover. Garth said that on stage at Belmont University to Britt Todd and in his music video he has his daughter playing next to him while he sings.

== Background and production ==
Garth provided the following background information on the song in the CD booklet liner notes from The Hits:

"If Tomorrow Never Comes" will probably always be my signature song. I ran the idea for this song by what seemed like a thousand writers and no one really seemed to understand what I was looking for. On the day that Bob Doyle, my co-manager, introduced me to Kent Blazy, I passed this idea by Kent and he had the first verse down within fifteen seconds. I could tell he just felt it. Kent Blazy is a wonderful man, full of love and energy, and if we never write again, I hope that we are always friends first. Thank you Ireland for this moment."

== Music video ==
The music video for the song was directed by John Lloyd Miller, and features Brooks singing and playing guitar in a dim room. Next to him is a table with an oil lamp. The video shows a small child, played by the daughter of Steve Gatlin, brother of Larry Gatlin. The use of an antique screen is present through much of the video, which also features Brooks' then-wife, Sandy.

== Chart performance ==
"If Tomorrow Never Comes" entered the US Billboard Hot Country Singles chart on September 9, 1989, and peaked at number one on December 9.

=== Weekly charts ===
| Chart (1989) | Peak position |
|---|---|
| Canada Country Singles (RPM) | 2 |
| US Hot Country Songs (Billboard) | 1 |

| Chart (2022) | Peak position |
|---|---|
| Ireland (IRMA) | 54 |

=== Year-end charts ===
| Chart (1989) | Position |
|---|---|
| Canada Country Tracks (RPM) | 48 |
| US Country Songs (Billboard) | 84 |

| Chart (1990) | Position |
|---|---|
| US Country Songs (Billboard) | 75 |

== Joose version ==
"If Tomorrow Never Comes"

Single by Joose

from the album Joose
- B-side: "Remember When"; "Nature of Things"
- Released: February 11, 1997
- Studio: The Hit Factory (New York City) (radio remix)
- Length: 4:30 (album version); 4:03 (radio edit); 4:25 (radio remix edit)
- Label: EastWest; Flavor Unit
- Songwriters: Garth Brooks; Kent Blazy
- Producers: Leonardo Pettis; Hamza Lee

Joose singles chronology
| "If Tomorrow Never Comes" (1997) | "Your Love Is So Nice" (1997) |

Audio
- "If Tomorrow Never Comes" on YouTube

American R&B group Joose covered the song as a power ballad and released it as a single in February 1997. This version was produced by group member Leonardo Pettis along with Hamza Lee. Joose's version missed the top 50 of the US Billboard Hot 100, peaking at number 51, but became a number-one hit in New Zealand, where it stayed at number one for two weeks and was certified gold for sales exceeding 5,000.

=== Track listings ===
US and Australian maxi-CD single

1. "If Tomorrow Never Comes" (album version)
2. "If Tomorrow Never Comes" (radio remix)
3. "If Tomorrow Never Comes" (Jeep mix)
4. "If Tomorrow Never Comes" (23rd Street remix)
5. "Remember When" (album version)
6. "Nature of Things"

US CD and cassette single

1. "If Tomorrow Never Comes" (radio edit) – 4:03
2. "If Tomorrow Never Comes" (radio remix edit) – 4:25
3. "If Tomorrow Never Comes (Will She Know)" (23rd Street remix) – 4:34

=== Credits and personnel ===
Credits are lifted from the "If Tomorrow Never Comes" and Joose liner notes.

Studios

- Vocals tracked at Talamasca Studios (Panorama City, California) and Cove City Sound Studios (Glen Cove, New York)
- Album version mixed at Cove City Sound Studios (Glen Cove, New York)
- Radio remix recorded and mixed at The Hit Factory (New York City)

Personnel

- Leonardo Pettis – production, vocal arrangement, music arrangement, vocal tracking
- Hamza Lee – all instruments, production, music arrangement
- Dave "DibS" Shackney – vocal tracking, mixing
- Darrell "Delite" Allamby – remixing, all instruments, mixing (radio remix)
- Carl Nappa – recording, mixing (radio remix)

=== Charts ===
==== Weekly charts ====
| Chart (1997) | Peak position |
|---|---|
| New Zealand (Recorded Music NZ) | 1 |
| US Billboard Hot 100 | 51 |
| US Hot R&B Singles (Billboard) | 68 |
| US Top 40/Mainstream (Billboard) | 34 |
| US Top 40/Rhythm-Crossover (Billboard) | 27 |

==== Year-end charts ====
| Chart (1997) | Position |
|---|---|
| New Zealand (RIANZ) | 11 |
| US Rhythmic Top 40 (Billboard) | 95 |

=== Certifications ===
| Region | Certification | Certified units/sales |
|---|---|---|
| New Zealand (RMNZ) | Gold | 5,000^{*} |
^{^} Shipments figures based on certification alone.

== Ronan Keating version ==
"If Tomorrow Never Comes"

Single by Ronan Keating

from the album Destination
- B-side: "Ronan Hits Megamix by DMC"; "Sea of Love"
- Released: April 29, 2002
- Studio: Various
- Genre: Country
- Length: 3:35
- Label: Polydor; Universal
- Songwriters: Garth Brooks; Kent Blazy
- Producer: Steve Mac

Ronan Keating singles chronology
| "Lovin' Each Day" (2001) | "If Tomorrow Never Comes" (2002) | "I Love It When We Do" (2002) |

"If Tomorrow Never Comes" served as the first single from Irish singer Ronan Keating's second studio album, Destination. Produced by Steve Mac, the song was released in Australia on April 29, 2002, and in the United Kingdom on May 6, 2002. It peaked at number one in the United Kingdom, giving Keating his third solo number one on the UK Singles Chart. The song also topped the charts of Austria, the Czech Republic, Denmark, and Norway, and it entered the top 10 in 11 other countries, including Australia, Ireland, New Zealand, and Sweden.

=== Music video ===
The video starts with Keating sitting on a bed and staring at the woman sleeping in it. He leaves his house and, having fallen onto a road in the path of a moving car, he is run over by it. He goes through the same scene multiple times, apparently stuck in a time loop, unrealistically singing throughout. At the end, he stops the loop by avoiding crossing the road and, instead, walking along the same sidewalk where his front door is.

=== Track listings ===
UK CD1

1. "If Tomorrow Never Comes" – 3:35
2. "If Tomorrow Never Comes" (Groove Brothers mix) – 6:08
3. "Interview with Westlife: Ronan Reveals His Secrets to Brian & Nicky" (CD-ROM video)

UK CD2

1. "If Tomorrow Never Comes"
2. "Ronan Hits Megamix by DMC"
3. "Sea of Love"
4. "If Tomorrow Never Comes" (video)

UK cassette single

A1. "If Tomorrow Never Comes"
A2. "If Tomorrow Never Comes" (Groove Brothers mix)
B1. "Ronan Hits Megamix by DMC"

=== Credits and personnel ===
Credits are lifted from the Destination album booklet.

Studios

- Recorded at various studios in Los Angeles, London, and Dublin
- Mixed at Rokstone Studios (London, England)
- Engineered at Rokstone Studios and Olympic Studios (London, England)
- Master engineered at Metropolis (London, England)
- Mastered at Gateway Mastering (Portland, Maine, US)

Personnel

- Garth Brooks – writing
- Kent Blazy – writing
- The Tuff Session Singers – background vocals
- Friðrik "Frizzy" Karlsson – guitar
- Steve Pearce – bass
- Dave Arch – piano, string arrangement
- Eddie Hession – accordion
- Steve Mac – keyboards, production, mixing, arrangement
- Chris Laws – drums, engineering
- Daniel Pursey – assistant engineering
- Phil Rose – assistant engineering
- Bob Ludwig – mastering
- Tim Young – master engineerering

=== Charts ===
==== Weekly charts ====
| Chart (2002) | Peak position |
|---|---|
| Australia (ARIA) | 3 |
| Austria (Ö3 Austria Top 40) | 1 |
| Belgium (Ultratop 50 Flanders) | 4 |
| Croatia (HRT) | 4 |
| Czech Republic (IFPI) | 1 |
| Denmark (Tracklisten) | 1 |
| Europe (Eurochart Hot 100) | 2 |
| France (SNEP) | 9 |
| Germany (GfK) | 5 |
| Ireland (IRMA) | 3 |
| Italy (FIMI) | 21 |
| Netherlands (Dutch Top 40) | 2 |
| Netherlands (Single Top 100) | 2 |
| New Zealand (Recorded Music NZ) | 3 |
| Norway (VG-lista) | 1 |
| Poland Airplay (Music & Media) | 16 |
| Portugal (AFP) | 5 |
| Romania (Romanian Top 100) | 3 |
| Scottish Singles Sales (Official Charts) | 1 |
| Sweden (Sverigetopplistan) | 4 |
| Switzerland (Schweizer Hitparade) | 7 |
| UK Singles (Official Charts) | 1 |
| UK Airplay (Music Week) | 6 |

==== Year-end charts ====
| Chart (2002) | Position |
|---|---|
| Australia (ARIA) | 19 |
| Austria (Ö3 Austria Top 40) | 30 |
| Belgium (Ultratop 50 Flanders) | 14 |
| Europe (Eurochart Hot 100) | 21 |
| France (SNEP) | 54 |
| Germany (Media Control) | 32 |
| Ireland (IRMA) | 49 |
| Netherlands (Dutch Top 40) | 12 |
| Netherlands (Single Top 100) | 9 |
| New Zealand (RIANZ) | 12 |
| Sweden (Hitlistan) | 15 |
| Switzerland (Schweizer Hitparade) | 56 |
| Taiwan (Hito Radio) | 17 |
| UK Singles (OCC) | 11 |
| UK Airplay (Music Week) | 55 |

==== Decade-end charts ====
| Chart (2000–2009) | Position |
|---|---|
| Netherlands (Single Top 100) | 68 |
| UK Singles (OCC) | 85 |

=== Certifications ===
| Region | Certification | Certified units/sales |
|---|---|---|
| Australia (ARIA) | Platinum | 70,000^{^} |
| Belgium (BRMA) | Gold | 25,000^{*} |
| Denmark (IFPI Danmark) | Gold | 45,000^{‡} |
| New Zealand (RMNZ) | Platinum | 30,000^{‡} |
| Norway (IFPI Norway) | Platinum | |
| Sweden (GLF) | Gold | 15,000^{^} |
| United Kingdom (BPI) | Platinum | 600,000^{‡} |
^{*} Sales figures based on certification alone.^{^} Shipments figures based on certification alone.^{‡} Sales+streaming figures based on certification alone.

=== Release history ===
| Region | Date | Format(s) | Label(s) | Ref. |
|---|---|---|---|---|
| Australia | April 29, 2002 | CD | Polydor | |
| United Kingdom | May 6, 2002 | CD; cassette | Polydor | |
| New Zealand | May 27, 2002 | CD | Polydor | |
| Japan | July 24, 2002 | CD | Polydor | |
| United States | March 7, 2005 | Adult contemporary radio | Universal | |

== Other versions ==
Legião Urbana's front man Renato Russo recorded a cover for his debut solo album, The Stonewall Celebration Concert in 1994. Puerto Rican salsa singer Ismael Miranda recorded the Spanish version on his 1997 album Con Buena Nota. In 1999, Westlife performed part of the song live a capella. Engelbert Humperdinck included the song on his 2003 album Definition of Love. It also became part of Barry Manilow's concert repertoire, and is featured on his 2004 live album 2 Nights Live!. Manilow had previously released a studio version of the song on his 1992 CD box set The Complete Collection and then some..... Claudia Jung made a German cover titled "Wenn es morgen nicht mehr gibt"..

In the 2000s, the song has gained added visibility with performances on reality television competition shows, with third-place finisher Elliott Yamin singing it on the fifth season of American Idol. Second season The X Factor winner Shayne Ward performing it in that series' penultimate round, and Australian Idol 2006 winner Damien Leith singing it on Top 10: Number One's Night. Foster & Allen recorded a version which they released on their 2005 album, Foster & Allen – Sing The Number 1's On June 30, 2009, Kevin Skinner sang this song during the auditions on the NBC series America's Got Talent.
