= New Grass Revival discography =

- Studio albums: 9
- Live albums: 2
- Compilation albums: 3
- Singles: 6

The discography of progressive bluegrass group New Grass Revival spanned two decades (1972–1989), comprising nine studio albums, two live albums, and appearances on albums of other artists, including Leon Russell and Peter Rowan. Three compilation albums have been released since the group's break-up in 1989.

== Albums ==
=== Studio albums ===
Year	Album	US Country	Label
1972	New Grass Revival		Starday
1975	Fly Through the Country		Flying Fish
1977	When the Storm is Over		Flying Fish
1979	Barren County		Flying Fish
1981	Commonwealth		Flying Fish
1984	On the Boulevard		Sugar Hill
1986	New Grass Revival	66	EMI
1987	Hold to a Dream		Capitol
1989	Friday Night in America		Capitol

=== Live albums ===
Year	Album	Label
1977	Too Late to Turn Back Now	Flying Fish
1984	Live	Flying Fish

=== Compilation albums ===
Year	Album	Label
1990	Anthology	Liberty
1994	Best of New Grass Revival	Liberty
2005	Grass Roots: The Best of the New Grass Revival	Capitol

=== Collaborations ===
Year	Album	Label
1977	Land of the Navajo (with Peter Rowan)	Flying Fish
1981	The Live Album (with Leon Russell)	Paradise
1984	Deviation (with Bela Fleck)	Rounder
1984	Late as Usual (with Sam Bush)	Rounder
2001	Rhythm & Bluegrass: Hank Wilson, Vol. 4 (with Leon Russell)	Leon Russell

== Singles ==
Year	Single	Chart Positions		Album
Year	Single	US Country	CAN Country	Album
1986	"What You Do to Me"	78	—	New Grass Revival
1986	"Ain't That Peculiar"	53	—	New Grass Revival
1987	"Unconditional Love"	44	—	Hold to a Dream
1988	"Can't Stop Now"	45	—	Hold to a Dream
1989	"Callin' Baton Rouge"	37	33	Friday Night in America
1989	"You Plant Your Fields"	58	68	Friday Night in America

== Videography ==
- Leon Russell and New Grass Revival: The Live Video (Paradise 1981, Monarch 1994)
- Austin City Limits #905, recorded November 6, 1983 (PBS February 1984)
- New Country at the Cannery (TNN 1986)
- New Country at the Cannery (TNN 1987)
- Lonesome Pine Special, New Grass Revival (Kentucky Educational Television 1987)

=== Music videos ===
Year	Video	Director
1988	"Can't Stop Now"	Michael Salomon
1989	"Callin' Baton Rouge"	Michael Salomon
