= Best of New Grass Revival =

Best Of New Grass Revival

Greatest hits album by New Grass Revival
- Released: 1994
- Genre: Progressive bluegrass
- Length: 40:05
- Label: Liberty
- Producer: Sam Bush

New Grass Revival chronology
Friday Night in America (1989)	Best Of New Grass Revival (1994)	Anthology (1994)

Professional ratings
Review scores
Source	Rating
AllMusic	4/5 stars

Best of New Grass Revival is a 1994 compilation album by progressive bluegrass band New Grass Revival. The cuts feature the 1981–1989 lineup of the band. A second compilation was released in 2005 under the title Grass Roots: The Best of the New Grass Revival featuring this lineup as well as earlier band members.

== Track listing ==
1. "Love Someone Like Me" (Dunn, Foster) – 2:41
2. "Sweet Release" (Flynn) – 4:22
3. "In the Middle of the Night" (Flynn) – 4:27
4. "Saw You Runnin'" (Moore) – 3:10
5. "Revival" (Rowan) – 3:51
6. "Hold to a Dream" (O´Brien) – 3:36
7. "Can't Stop Now" (Nicholson, Waldman) – 3:58
8. "Metric Lips" (Fleck) – 4:35
9. "Unconditional Love" (Cook, Nicholson) – 3:22
10. "Friday Night in America" (Flynn, Smith) – 3:55
11. "You Plant Your Fields" (Lowery, Waldman) – 3:11
12. "Let's Make a Baby King" (Winchester) – 3:30
13. "Do What You Gotta Do" (Flynn) – 3:30
14. "Let Me Be Your Man" (Ritchey) – 3:05
15. "Callin' Baton Rouge" (Linde) – 2:39
16. "Big Foot" (Fleck) – 7:54
17. "Angel Eyes" (Hiatt, Koller) – 4:29
18. "I'm Down" (Lennon, McCartney) – 2:10

== Personnel ==
- John Cowan - bass guitar, vocals
- Béla Fleck - banjo, vocals
- Pat Flynn - guitar, vocals
- Sam Bush - fiddle, mandolin, guitar, vocals
