= Anthology (New Grass Revival album) =

Compilation album by New Grass Revival
- Released: 1990
- Genre: Progressive bluegrass
- Length: 40:05
- Label: Liberty
- Producer: Garth Fundis

New Grass Revival chronology
Best of New Grass Revival (1994)	Anthology (1990)	Grass Roots: The Best of the New Grass Revival (2005)

Professional ratings
Review scores
Source	Rating
AllMusic	4.5/5 stars

Anthology is a 1990 compilation album by progressive bluegrass band New Grass Revival.

== Track listing ==
1. "Can't Stop Now" (Nicholson, Waldman) – 3:56
2. "Ain't That Peculiar" (Moore, Robinson, Rogers) – 2:48
3. "Angel Eyes" (Hiatt, Koller) – 4:29
4. "Revival" (Rowan) – 3:51
5. "Metric Lips" (Fleck) – 4:33
6. "Reach" (Hall) – 3:56
7. "You Plant Your Fields" (Lowery, Waldman) – 3:30
8. "Callin' Baton Rouge" (Linde) – 2:38
9. "Hold to a Dream" (O'Brien) – 3:38
10. "Friday Night in America" (Flynn, Smith) – 3:52

== Personnel ==
- John Cowan - bass guitar, vocals
- Béla Fleck - banjo, vocals
- Pat Flynn - guitar, vocals
- Sam Bush - fiddle, mandolin, guitar, vocals
