= Commonwealth (New Grass Revival album) =

Studio album by New Grass Revival
- Released: 1981
- Genre: Progressive bluegrass
- Length: 40:05
- Label: Flying Fish
- Producer: Sam Bush

New Grass Revival chronology
Barren County (1979)	Commonwealth (1981)	Live in Toulouse (1981)

Professional ratings
Review scores
Source	Rating
AllMusic	4/5 stars

Commonwealth is the fifth studio album by progressive bluegrass band New Grass Revival, released in 1981 on the Flying Fish label. This album was the last one for two band members, Courtney Johnson and Curtis Burch, who cited fatigue with the band's touring schedule.

== Track listing ==
1. "Reach" (Johanna Hall) – 4:48
2. "Steam Powered Aereo Plane" (John Hartford) – 4:29
3. "One Day I'll Walk" (Bruce Cockburn) – 2:52
4. "Nothing Wasted, Nothing Gained" (Steve Brines, Sam Bush) – 2:42
5. "Pack of Fools" (Andy Kulberg, Jim Roberts) – 4:45
6. "Nothing Without You" (Bryan Hayworth) – 3:51
7. "Deeper and Deeper" (Bob Lucas) – 6:12
8. "Wicked Path of Sin" (Monroe) – 2:35
9. "Sapporo" (Bush) – 8:10

== Personnel ==
- Sam Bush – mandolin, electric guitar, guitar, fiddle, lead vocals
- John Cowan – electric bass, lead vocals
- Courtney Johnson – banjo, vocals
- Curtis Burch – guitar, Dobro, vocals
- Kenny Malone – drums
- Leon Russell – piano
- Sharon White – vocals

Production notes

- Produced by Sam Bush
- Richard Adler – engineer, mastering supervisor
- Keith Case – executive producer
- Jim Lloyd – mastering
- Willy Matthews – design

== See also ==
- New Grass Revival discography
