= Faster & Llouder =

Studio album by Foster & Lloyd
- Released: April 4, 1989
- Recorded: 1988
- Studio: 16th Ave. Sound, Nashville, TN
- Genre: Country
- Length: 35:50
- Label: RCA Nashville
- Producer: Bill Lloyd; Radney Foster; Rick Will

Foster & Lloyd chronology
Foster & Lloyd (1987)	Faster & Llouder (1989)	Version of the Truth (1990)

Faster & Llouder is the second studio album by American country music duo Foster & Lloyd. It contained their last Top 10 song, "Fair Shake". The other singles released, "Before the Heartache Rolls In" and "Suzette" failed to break into the top 40. The album itself peaked at No. 44 on the Billboard Top Country Albums chart. It was, however, their only album to appear on the Billboard 200, charting at No. 142.

== Content ==
The duo co-wrote most of the songs on the album, with Guy Clark co-writing for the successful single "Fair Shake" and Pat Terry co-writing the last track with Bill Lloyd. The track "Before The Heartache Rolls In" was covered by Hootie & the Blowfish in 1997 and included as a B-side to the band's single, "Old Man & Me". Vince Gill contributes his guitar playing skills on the opening track "Faster and Louder".

== Reception ==
Professional ratings
Review scores
Source	Rating
AllMusic	4.5/5 stars

Rudyard Kennedy of AllMusic called the album a "superior example of new country..before the term 'New Country' was invented" and calling the material on the album "Just as good, if not better, than that of the songs on the first album.

== Track listing ==
- Songs written by Bill Lloyd and Radney Foster unless otherwise noted

No.	Title	Writer(s)	Length
1.	"Faster and Louder"		2:33
2.	"Fair Shake"	Guy Clark, Foster, Lloyd	3:26
3.	"She Knows What She Wants"		3:39
4.	"Happy for Awhile"		4:08
5.	"Fat Lady Sings"		4:34
6.	"After I'm Gone"		3:10
7.	"I'll Always Be Here Loving You"	Foster	2:56
8.	"Suzette"	Lloyd	2:42
9.	"Before The Heartache Rolls In"		3:49
10.	"Lie to Yourself"	Lloyd, Pat Terry	4:41

== Chart performance ==
=== Album ===
Chart (1989)	Peak position
U.S. Billboard Top Country Albums	44
U.S. Billboard 200	142

=== Singles ===
Year	Single	Peak positions	
Year	Single	US Country	CAN Country
1988	"Fair Shake"	5	5
1989	"Before the Heartache Rolls In"	43	77
1989	"Suzette"	48	52

== Personnel ==
As listed in liner notes.

=== Foster & Lloyd ===
- Radney Foster - lead vocals, background vocals
- Bill Lloyd - lead vocals, harmony vocals, electric guitar, acoustic guitar, mandolin, piano, tambourine

=== Musicians ===
- Bruce Bouton - pedal steel guitar, lap steel guitar
- Sam Bush - fiddle on "Happy for a While"
- John Cowan - third part harmony vocals on "She Knows What She Wants" and "After I'm Gone"
- Marshall Crenshaw - electric rhythm guitar, solo guitars, 6 string bass on "She Knows What She Wants"
- Beth Nielsen Chapman - background vocals on "Before The Next Heartache Rolls In"
- Jerry Douglas - dobro on "Happy For a While"
- Vince Gill - electric guitar on "Faster and Louder"
- Mike McAdam - 6 string bass
- Tommy Wells - drums
- Glenn Worf - bass guitar
