= Live (New Grass Revival album) =

Live album by New Grass Revival
- Released: 1984
- Genre: Progressive bluegrass
- Label: Flying Fish
- Producer: New Grass Revival

New Grass Revival chronology
Commonwealth (1981)	Live (1984)	On the Boulevard (1984)

Professional ratings
Review scores
Source	Rating
AllMusic	link

Live is a live album by New Grass Revival, recorded on June 3, 1983, during the first bluegrass festival in France, Toulouse Bluegrass Festival, and released in 1984. It was the first New Grass Revival album to include Béla Fleck and Pat Flynn.

== Track listing ==
1. "White Freight Liner Blues" (Townes Van Zandt)
2. "Good Woman´s Love" (Cy Coben)
3. "One More Love Song" (Leon Russell)
4. "Walking in Jerusalem" (Bill Monroe)
5. "Watermelon Man"
6. "Reach" (John Hall, Johanna Hall)
7. "Sapporo" (Bush)

== Personnel ==
- Sam Bush - vocals, mandolin, guitar, fiddle
- Pat Flynn - vocals, guitar
- Béla Fleck - banjo
- John Cowan - vocals, bass guitar

== See also ==
- New Grass Revival discography
