= Grass Roots: The Best of the New Grass Revival =

Grass Roots: The Best of New Grass Revival

Compilation album by New Grass Revival
- Released: 2005
- Genre: Progressive bluegrass
- Label: Capitol

New Grass Revival chronology
Anthology (1990)	Grass Roots: The Best of New Grass Revival (2005)

Professional ratings
Review scores
Source	Rating
AllMusic	link

Grass Roots: The Best of New Grass Revival is a compilation album by the progressive bluegrass band New Grass Revival, released in 2005.

== Track listing ==
1. Great Balls of Fire (Blackwell, Hammer) ) 2:07
2. Prince of Peace (Dempsey, (Russell)) 5:27
3. Casey Jones (Traditional) 4:21
4. The Dancer (Brines, Bush) 3:42
5. Doin' My Time (Skinner) 6:40
6. All Night Train (Brines, Bush) 3:12
7. Vamp in the Middle (Hartford) 3:44
8. Spring Peepers (Lucas) 3:27
9. Lee Highway Blues (Traditional) 5:49
10. Souvenir Bottles (Brines, Bush), (Cowan) 5:49
11. Sapporo (Bush) 8:11
12. Steam Powered Aero Plane (Hartford) 4:30
13. When the Storm Is Over (Lucas) 2:37
14. You Don't Knock (Staples, Westbrook) 2:42
15. White Freight Liner Blues [live] (VanZandt) 3:05
16. Good Woman's Love [live] (Coban) 4:27
17. Reach [live] (Hall) 4:54
18. One More Love Song (Russell) 3:22
19. On the Boulevard (Flynn) 4:13
20. One Love/People Get Ready (Marley, Mayfield) 3:54
21. Seven by Seven (Fleck) 3:17
22. In the Middle of the Night (Flynn) 4:29
23. Sweet Release (Flynn) 4:23
24. Metric Lips (Fleck) 4:36
25. Unconditional Love (Cook, Nicholson) 3:22
26. Looking Past You (Flynn) 2:57
27. Revival [live] (Rowan) 4:03
28. Ain't That Peculiar [live] (Moore, Robinson Jr., Rogers) 3:02
29. Callin' Baton Rouge (Linde) 2:41
30. I'm Down (Lennon, McCartney) 2:12
31. Angel Eyes (Hiatt, Koller) 4:29
32. Don't You Hear Jerusalem Moan (Traditional) 3:57
33. Do What You Gotta Do (Flynn) 3:33
34. Singing the Blues (McCreary) 11:12
35. Can't Stop Now (Nicholson, Waldman) 4:28

== Personnel ==
- Sam Bush – guitar, mandolin, fiddle, vocals
- Pat Flynn – guitar, vocals
- Curtis Burch – guitar, Dobro, vocals
- Béla Fleck – banjo, vocals
- Courtney Johnson – banjo, vocals
- John Cowan – vocals, bass

Additional musicians:

- Eddie Bayers – drums
- Bob Mater – drums
- Tom Roady – percussion
