= Version of the Truth =

Studio album by Foster & Lloyd
- Released: May 12, 1990
- Recorded: 1989 at Sixteenth Avenue Sound; Nashville, TN
- Genre: Country
- Length: 33:30
- Label: RCA Nashville
- Producer: Bill Lloyd; Radney Foster; Rick Will; Josh Leo

Foster & Lloyd chronology
Faster & Llouder (1989)	Version of the Truth (1990)	The Essential Foster and Lloyd (1996)

Version of the Truth is the third studio album by American country music duo Foster & Lloyd. Despite it charting higher (#40) than their previous album, Faster & Llouder (#44), Its singles were less successful. The first, "Is It Love" peaked at #43 on the Billboard Hot Country Songs chart while the second "Can't Have Nothin'" reached #38, their most successful single since 1988's "Fair Shake". Jeff Hanna, a founding member of The Nitty Gritty Dirt Band makes a guest appearance singing harmony on the title track. Other guest musicians include Bernie Leadon from Eagles and Duane Eddy, among others.

"I Will Love You Anyhow" was a single for Tim Ryan in 1992.

== Track listing ==
All songs written by Radney Foster and Bill Lloyd; "All Said and Done" co-written by Vince Gill.

1. "Is It Love" - 2:38
2. "Version of the Truth" - 3:01
3. "I Wishdaida Run Into You" - 3:59
4. "Leavin' in Your Eyes" – 2:57
5. "Side of the Road" - 3:51
6. "It's a Done Deal" - 3:51
7. "Lonesome Run" – 5:10
8. "It's Over" - 2:40
9. "All Said and Done" - 3:23
10. "Workin' on Me" - 3:48
11. "Whoa" - 2:41

=== Reissue track listing ===
1. "Is It Love?" - 2:57
2. "Can't Have Nothin'" - 3:27
3. "I Will Love You Anyhow" - 3:08
4. "Version Of the Truth" - 2:56
5. "Leavin' In Your Eyes" - 2:58
6. "Side Of The Road" - 3:53
7. "It's A Done Deal" - 3:53
8. "Take A Little Time For Love" - 2:47
9. "I Wishdaida Run Into You" - 3:59
10. "It's Over" - 2:40
11. "All Said And Done" - 3:23
12. "Whoa" - 2:29

== Personnel ==
As listed in liner notes.

=== Foster & Lloyd ===
- Radney Foster - lead vocals, background vocals, acoustic guitar, electric guitar, hand claps
- Bill Lloyd - harmony vocals, "the occasional lead vocal", acoustic guitar, electric guitar, hand claps

=== And... Our Band... ===
- Pete Finney - pedal steel guitar
- Byron House - bass guitar, banjo on "It's Over"
- Bob Mummert - drums

=== Our Guests... ===
- Sam Bush - fiddle on "Lonesome Road", mandolin on "Leavin' in Your Eyes"
- John Cowan - vocal harmony on "Lonesome Run" and "All Said and Done"
- Jerry Douglas - lap steel guitar on "It's a Done Deal" and "Lonesome Run"
- Vince Gill - electric guitar fills and solo on "It's a Done Deal"
- Jeff Hanna - harmony vocals on "Version of the Truth"
- Bernie Leadon - electric low-string guitar on "All Said and Done"

=== The "Whoa" lineup ===
- Felix Cavaliere - B-3 organ
- Duane Eddy - electric guitar
- R.S. Field - drums
- Radney Foster - acoustic guitar
- Albert Lee - electric guitar
- Bill Lloyd - Six string bass
- Garry Tallent - bass guitar
- Rusty Young - pedal steel guitar

=== "Workin' on Me" ===
- Bruce Bouton - pedal steel guitar
- Tommy Wells - drums
- Glenn Worf - bass guitar

== Chart performance ==
=== Album ===
Chart (1990)	Peak position
U.S. Billboard Top Country Albums	40

=== Singles ===
Year	Single	Peak positions	
Year	Single	US Country	CAN Country
1990	"Is It Love"	43	26
1990	"Can't Have Nothin'"	38	59
