= Scott Vestal =

American singer-songwriter (born 1962)

- Born: May 8, 1962 (age 64); Duncan, Oklahoma, U.S.
- Genres: Bluegrass music, Country music, jazz music
- Occupations: Musician, recording engineer
- Instrument: Banjo
- Years active: 1971–present
- Label: Pinecastle Records
- Formerly of: Doyle Lawson and Quicksilver, John Cowan Band
- Website: scottvestal.com

Scott Vestal is an American banjoist, songwriter and luthier, known for his innovative approach to playing and designing the banjo.

== Biography ==
=== Early years ===
The older of two children, Scott Vestal was raised in Duncan, Oklahoma in a musical family. His Grandfather Famon Self was a country fiddler who taught Vestal his first guitar chords. Scott and his brother Curtis played and sang with their grandfather at bluegrass festivals and other events.

=== Music career ===
Vestal acquired a 5-string banjo at age 13 and by age 15 was playing with T. J. Rogers’ family band. At age 18, Vestal performed and recorded with Larry Sparks for a year. At age 19, Vestal moved to Texas and with his brother Curtis and Russell Moore formed the band Southern Connection, which toured the Midwest and East Coast for 3 years.

In 1985, Vestal and Russell Moore joined Doyle Lawson and Quicksilver, replacing Terry Baucom. Vestal stayed with Quicksilver for four years and five albums.

Vestal then formed his group Livewire with mandolinist Wayne Benson, guitarist and vocalist Robert Hale, and bassist Ernie Sykes. Vestal toured Japan with an acoustic jazz ensemble, and starred in Phyllis McBride's original musical production Cowboy Cafe.

In 1994, Vestal moved to Nashville and formed a band with Harley Allen and David Parmley. When Allen decided to focus on songwriting, the band became David Parmley, Scott Vestal, and Continental Divide. Over the next 5 years, the band recorded three albums and toured the US and Canada. Vestal left Continental Divide in 1998.

Vestal produced, engineered, and played on an annual series of instrumental albums for Pinecastle Records. The initial project started as a solo album for Mountain Heart guitarist Clay Jones. When Jones went another direction, Vestal salvaged the project as an instrumental album.

The “Bluegrass Annual” series won the IBMA award for Recorded Event of the Year in 1996. This series of recordings continued from 1995 through 2001.

Scott played on Johnny Staats’ mandolin project with John Cowan. From 1998 until 2003, Vestal and Cowan were in the John Cowan Band, and recorded two albums together. Vestal had the opportunity to incorporating a solid body electric MIDI banjo into their recordings and performances.

In 2006, Vestal worked with David Lee Roth to promote the CMH Records Van Halen bluegrass tribute Strummin' with the Devil: The Southern Side of Van Halen, appearing on late night and daytime talk shows and at a concert at the Nokia Theater in New York City.

Starting in 2006, Vestal recorded and toured with the Sam Bush Band along with Stephen Mougin (guitar), Todd Parks (bass), and Chris Brown (drums).

=== Recording and session work ===
As well as being a session player in Nashville, Vestal built Digital Underground, a recording studio where he engineers, produces, and performs on various projects.

Vestal has worked with Bill Monroe, Tim O'Brien, Jim Lauderdale, Shawn Camp, Ricky Skaggs, Jerry Douglas, Tony Rice, Vassar Clements, Chris Thile, Hank Williams III, Kenny Chesney, Del McCoury, Dierks Bentley, Billy Ray Cyrus, Alan Jackson, Dolly Parton, Dwight Yoakam, and others.

Vestal and his wife, jazz singer Alice Newman Vestal, recorded the album Goin’ To The Dance. Steve Thomas (fiddle), Chris Brown (drums), Jeff Autry (guitar), Byron House (bass), and Randy Kohrs (resophonic guitar) assisted.

=== Solo career ===
Vestal wrote nine of thirteen songs on his first solo album In Pursuit Of Happiness and nine of twelve songs on his album Millennia.

On Vestal's 1992 album In Pursuit Of Happiness, the personnel are Curtis Vestal (bass), Jeff Autry (guitar), Wayne Benson (mandolin), and Greg Luck (fiddle).

On Millennia, released in 2000, Vestal is joined by John Cowan on vocals, Reese Winans on keyboards, Pasi Leppikangas on drums, Jeff Autry and Jim Hurst on guitars, and Stuart Duncan, Kati Penn, and Rickie Simpkins on fiddle.

=== Stealth Banjos ===
Vestal's banjo company Stealth Banjos sells instruments he has designed and developed. It features an innovative hidden 5th string and a streamlined neck and headstock.

=== Awards ===
Scott was awarded Banjo Player of the Year in 1996 by the International Bluegrass Music Association (co-winner with Sammy Shelor), and 1998 Banjo Player of the Year by the Bluegrass Now Magazine Fan's Choice Awards.

In 2017, Vestal was awarded the Steve Martin Prize for Excellence in Banjo and Bluegrass.

== Discography ==
=== Solo albums ===
- 1992: In Pursuit of Happiness (self-released)
- 2000: Millennia (Pinecastle)

=== ASV (Scott Vestal and Alice Newman Vestal) ===
- 2006: Goin' To the Dance (Bless Your Heart Music)

=== With Larry Sparks ===
- 1981: Ramblin' Letters (Acoustic Revival)

=== With Southern Connection ===
- 1984: Southern Connection (Peach's)

=== With Doyle Lawson and Quicksilver ===
- 1986: Beyond the Shadows (Sugar Hill)
- 1987: The News is Out (Sugar Hill)
- 1987: Heaven's Joy Awaits: A Cappella Quartets (Sugar Hill)
- 1988: I'll Wander Back Someday (Sugar Hill)
- 1988: Hymn Time in the Country (Sugar Hill)
- 2004: A School Of Bluegrass (Crossroads)

=== With Livewire ===
- 1989: Wired! (Rounder)

=== With David Parmley and Continental Divide ===
- 1995: David Parmley/Scott Vestal and Continental Divide (Pinecastle)
- 1996: On the Divide (Pinecastle)
- 1998: Feel Good Day (Pinecastle)

=== With John Cowan ===
- 2002: Always Take Me Back (Sugar Hill)
- 2009: Telluride Live (Entertainment One)

=== With Sam Bush ===
- 2006: Laps in Seven (Sugar Hill)
- 2009: Circles Around Me (Sugar Hill)
- 2016: Storyman (Sugar Hill)

=== Bluegrass Annual series ===
- 1995: various artists - Bluegrass '95 (Pinecastle)
- 1996: various artists - Bluegrass '96 (Pinecastle)
- 1997: various artists - Bluegrass '97 (Pinecastle)
- 1998: various artists - Bluegrass '98 (Pinecastle)
- 1999: various artists - Bluegrass '99 (Pinecastle)
- 2000: various artists - Bluegrass 2000 (Pinecastle)
- 2001: various artists - Bluegrass 2001 (Pinecastle)
- 2020: various artists - Bluegrass 2020 (Pinecastle)
- 2022: various artists - Bluegrass 2022 (Pinecastle)

=== As engineer / mixer ===
- 2005: Wildfire - Rattle The Chains (Pinecastle)
- 2010: Audie Blaylock and Redline - Cryin' Heart Blues (Rural Rhythm)
- 2012: Audie Blaylock and Redline - Hard Country (Rural Rhythm)
- 2014: Town Mountain - Live at the Isis (self-released)
- 2016: Blue Highway - Original Traditional (Rounder)
- 2016: Town Mountain - Southern Crescent (LoHi)
- 2017: Mac Wiseman - I Sang the Song (Mountain Fever)
- 2018: Williamson Branch - Free (Pinecastle)

=== As producer ===
- 2007: Scott Anderson - Rivers (Mato Music)
- 2012: Robert Hale - Pure & Simple (Pinecastle)

=== Also appears on ===
==== 197? - 1999 ====
- 197?: Pickin' Tymes - Bluegrass Past - Present - Future (Jackalope) - exact release date unknown
- 1996: Barry Berrier - First Time with Feeling (Pinecastle)
- 1996: Barbara Lamb - Tonight I Feel Like Texas (Sugar Hill)
- 1996: Aubrey Haynie - Doin' My Time (Sugar Hill)
- 1997: Chris Thile - Stealing Second (Sugar Hill)
- 1998: Richard Bennett - Long Lonesome Time (Rebel)
- 1998: Paul Craft - Brother Jukebox (Strictly Country)
- 1999: Jeff Autry - Foothills (Pinecastle)
- 1999: Phil Leadbetter - Philibuster (Rounder)
- 1999: Nancy Moore - Local Flowers (Pinecastle)
- 1999: Jon Randall - Willin' (Eminent)
- 1999: Marshall Wilborn - Root 5: Bass and Banjo (Pinecastle)

==== 2000 - 2009 ====
- 2000: Aubrey Haynie - A Man Must Carry On (Sugar Hill)
- 2000: Johnny Staats Project - Wires & Wood (Giant)
- 2000: various artists - Knee Deep in Bluegrass: The AcuTab Sessions (Rebel)
- 2001: Randy Kohrs - Crack in My Armour (Junction)
- 2001: Wildfire - Uncontained (Pinecastle)
- 2002: Drew Emmitt - Freedom Ride (Compass)
- 2002: Jim Hurst - Second Son (Pinecastle)
- 2003: Wayne Benson - An Instrumental Anthology (Pinecastle)
- 2003: Craig Campbell - Never Regret (Bigger Picture)
- 2003: Grandstaff - Circles (Compendia)
- 2003: The Larkins - Larkins (Audium)
- 2003: Donna Hughes - 'Same Old Me' ([Flying Hound Publishing, BMI])
- 2004: Shawn Camp - Live At The Station Inn (Skeeterbit)
- 2004: Randy Kohrs - I'm Torn (Lonesome Day)
- 2004: The Woodys - Telluride to Tennessee (Madacy)
- 2005: Phil Leadbetter - Slide Effects (Pinecastle)
- 2006: Shawn Camp - Fireball (Skeeterbit)
- 2006: various artists - Strummin' with the Devil: The Southern Side of Van Halen (CMH)
- 2007: Shawn Camp and Billy Burnette - The Bluegrass Elvises (Vol 1) (American Roots)
- 2007: Kenny Chesney - Just Who I Am: Poets & Pirates (BNA)
- 2007: Donna Hughes - Gaining Wisdom (Rounder)
- 2007: Randy Kohrs - Old Photograph (Rural Rhythm)
- 2007: Laura Love - NēGrass (Octoroon Biography)
- 2007: Tony Trischka - Double Banjo Bluegrass Spectacular (Rounder)
- 2008: Ashton Shepherd - Sounds So Good (Mercury Nashville)
- 2008: Beth Stevens and Edge - Strong Enough (Pinecastle)
- 2009: Jim Lauderdale - Could We Get Any Closer? (Sky Crunch)
- 2009: Donna Ulisse - Walk This Mountain Down (Hadley)

==== 2010 - present ====
- 2010: Butch Baldassari and Van Manakas - Leavin' Tennessee (SoundArt)
- 2010: Dierks Bentley - Up on the Ridge (Capitol Nashville)
- 2010: Dailey & Vincent - Sing the Statler Brothers (Cracker Barrel / Rounder)
- 2010: Randy Kohrs - Quicksand (Rural Rhythm)
- 2010: Nora Jane Struthers - Nora Jane Struthers (Blue Pig)
- 2011: Billy Ray Cyrus - I'm American (Buena Vista)
- 2011: Kathy Joy Daugherty - Heart of Dreams (CD Baby)
- 2011: Jim Lauderdale - Reason And Rhyme: Bluegrass Songs by Robert Hunter & Jim Lauderdale (Sugar Hill)
- 2011: Tracy Parnell - A Walk In the Country (self-released)
- 2012: Derek Ryan - Dreamers and Believers (Sharpe)
- 2011: Ashton Shepherd - Where Country Grows (MCA Nashville)
- 2012: Dan Stevens - My Life of Adventure (Gatorbone)
- 2013: Jim Lauderdale - Old Time Angels (Sky Crunch)
- 2013: Keith Sewell - Love Is a Journey (Skaggs Family)
- 2017: The Mavericks - Brand New Day (Mono Mundo)
- 2012: Kenny Chesney - Welcome to the Fishbowl (Blue Chair / Columbia)
- 2012: Alan Jackson - Thirty Miles West (EMI Nashville)
- 2013: Dailey & Vincent - Brothers of the Highway (Rounder)
- 2013: various artists - Christmas Grass: The Collection (Red River) - track 7, "Deck The Halls"
- 2014: Dolly Parton - Blue Smoke (Dolly Records / Sony Masterworks)
- 2016: Irene Kelley - These Hills (Mountain Fever)
- 2016: Josh Williams - Modern Day Man (Rounder)
- 2016: Dwight Yoakam - Swimmin' Pools, Movie Stars... (Sugar Hill)

=== Music instruction ===
- 1995: Acutab Transcriptions, Vol. 1 (Acutab)
- 1998: Acutab Transcriptions, Vol. 2 (Acutab)
