= Barren County (album) =

Studio album by New Grass Revival
- Released: 1979
- Recorded: 1979
- Genre: Progressive bluegrass
- Length: 39:20
- Label: Flying Fish
- Producer: Sam Bush

New Grass Revival chronology
Too Late to Turn Back Now (1977)	Barren County (1979)	Commonwealth (1981)

Professional ratings
Review scores
Source	Rating
Allmusic	4/5 stars

Barren County is the fourth studio album by progressive bluegrass band New Grass Revival, released in 1979 on the Flying Fish label. The album is named for Barren County near the musicians' homes in south-central Kentucky in the United States.

== Track listing ==
1. "Dancin' With the Angels" (Peter Rowan) – 3:58
2. "In the Plan" (Gene Clark, Doug Dillard, Bernie Leadon) – 3:02
3. "How About You" (Jesse Winchester) – 4:02
4. "Crazy in the Night" (Steve Brines, Sam Bush) – 3:33
5. "Don't Look Back" (Brines, Bush) – 4:39
6. "Spring Peepers" (Lucas) – 3:23
7. "Souvenir Bottles" (Brines, Bush, John Cowan) – 5:47
8. "Goin' to the Fair" (Brines, Bush) – 5:11
9. "Lee Highway Blues" (Traditional) – 5:45

== Personnel ==
- Sam Bush - mandolin, electric guitar, guitar, fiddle, electric mandolin, lead vocals
- John Cowan - electric bass, lead vocals
- Courtney Johnson - banjo, guitar, vocals
- Curtis Burch - guitar, Dobro, vocals
- Kenny Smith - piano ("How About You")
- Kenny Malone - drums ("How About You", "Crazy in the Night", "Souvenir Bottles"), percussion ("Goin' to the Fair")
- Bill Kenner - mandolin ("Lee Highway Blues")
