= Fly Through the Country =

Studio album by New Grass Revival
- Released: 1975
- Genre: Progressive bluegrass
- Label: Flying Fish

New Grass Revival chronology
New Grass Revival (1972)	Fly Through the Country (1975)	When the Storm is Over (1977)

Professional ratings
Review scores
Source	Rating
AllMusic	4.5/5 stars

Fly Through the Country is the second studio album by the progressive bluegrass band New Grass Revival, released in 1975 on the Flying Fish label. It is also the title of the fifth song on the album.

In 1992, When the Storm is Over and Fly Through the Country were re-released on one CD.

== Track listing ==
1. "Skippin' in the Mississippi Dew" (John Hartford) - 2:37
2. "Good Woman's Love" (Cy Coben) - 3:16
3. "Glory" (Steven F. Brines & Sam Bush) - 3:04
4. "All Night Train" (Steven F. Brines & Sam Bush) - 3:12
5. "Fly Through the Country" (Jim Webb) - 5:16
6. "This Heart of Mine" (Steven F. Brines & Jim Smoak) - 2:10
7. "The Dancer" (Steven F. Brines & Sam Bush) - 3:44
8. "When She Made Laughter Easy" (Steven F. Brines & Sam Bush) - 3:16
9. "Doin' My Time" (Jimmie Skinner & Fred Rose) - 6:21
10. "These Days" (Jackson Browne) - 5:41

== Personnel ==
- Sam Bush - mandolin, lead vocals, violin, slide mandolin, acoustic guitar, electric guitar
- John Cowan - electric bass, lead vocals
- Courtney Johnson - banjo, vocals
- Curtis Burch - guitar, Dobro, vocals
- Chuck Cochran - electric piano
