= When the Storm Is Over =

When the Storm is Over

Studio album by New Grass Revival
- Released: 1977
- Genre: Progressive bluegrass
- Label: Flying Fish

New Grass Revival chronology
Fly Through the Country (1975)	When the Storm is Over (1977)	Too Late to Turn Back Now (1977)

Professional ratings
Review scores
Source	Rating
AllMusic	link

When the Storm is Over is the third studio album recorded by the progressive bluegrass band New Grass Revival, released in 1977 on Flying Fish Records. The album includes a mix of covers, both traditional and contemporary, as well as band-penned songs.

In 1992, When the Storm is Over and the band's preceding 1975 album, Fly Through the Country, were re-released together on a dual-album CD.

== Track listing ==
1. "Four Days of Rain" (Rick Roberts) - 3:39
2. "White Freight Liner Blues" (Townes van Zandt) - 2:38
3. "Sail to Australia" (Steven F. Brines & Sam Bush) - 3:48
4. "When the Storm Is Over" (Bob Lucas) - 2:40
5. "And He Says 'I Love You'" (Steven F. Brines & Sam Bush) - 3:42
6. "Vamp in the Middle" (John Hartford) - 3:44
7. "Like a Child in the Rain" (Steven F. Brines & Sam Bush) - 3:48
8. "Tennessee Wagoner" (Traditional) - 1:32
9. "Colly Davis" (Steven F. Brines & Jim Smoak) - 2:42
10. "Crooked Smile" (Sam Bush) - 7:42

== Personnel ==
- Sam Bush - mandolin, fiddle, lead vocals, guitar
- John Cowan - electric bass, lead vocals
- Courtney Johnson - banjo, guitar, vocals
- Curtis Burch - guitar, Dobro, vocals
- Chuck Cochran - electric piano
- Kenny Malone - congas, percussion
- Bobby Wood - piano (track 5)
