= Do What You Gotta Do =

- Brazilian release

Single by Garth Brooks

from the album Sevens
- Released: January 3, 2000
- Studio: Jack's Tracks (Nashville, Tennessee)
- Genre: Country
- Length: 2:57
- Label: Capitol Nashville
- Songwriter: Pat Flynn
- Producer: Allen Reynolds

Garth Brooks singles chronology
"That's the Way I Remember It" (1999)	"Do What You Gotta Do" (2000)	"When You Come Back to Me Again" (2000)

"Do What You Gotta Do" is a song written by guitarist Pat Flynn and recorded by New Grass Revival for their 1989 Capitol album Friday Night in America. The song was also recorded by American country music artist Garth Brooks. It was released in January 2000 as fifth and final single from the 1997 album Sevens. The song reached number 13 on the U.S. Billboard Hot Country Singles & Tracks (now Hot Country Songs) charts and peaked at number 18 on the Canadian RPM Country Tracks chart.

== Background ==
The song was issued over two years after the album's release by Capitol Records. This was due to a parcel of tepid reviews and soft sales for Garth Brooks side project, Chris Gaines.

== Critical reception ==
Deborah Evans Price, of Billboard magazine reviewed the song favorably, calling it a "high-energy, uptempo, and buoyed by tasty fiddle and crisp, clean production." She also says that the "positive message and infectious melody should make it a quick radio favorite." On Brooks' performance she says that it is "personality-packed" and "full of conviction and passion."

== Chart performance ==
"Do What You Gotta Do" debuted at number 61 on the U.S. Billboard Hot Country Singles & Tracks for the chart week of January 15, 2000.

Chart (2000)	Peak position
Canada Country Singles (RPM)	18
US Billboard Hot 100	69
US Hot Country Songs (Billboard)	13
