= Hold to a Dream =

Studio album by New Grass Revival
- Released: 1987
- Recorded: 1987
- Studio: Nashville Sound Connection; Sound Emporium (Nashville, Tennessee)
- Genre: Progressive bluegrass
- Length: 37:34
- Label: Capitol
- Producer: Garth Fundis

New Grass Revival chronology
New Grass Revival (1986)	Hold to a Dream (1987)	Friday Night in America (1989)

Hold to a Dream is an album by the progressive bluegrass band New Grass Revival, released in 1987. The lead single "Unconditional Love" reached number 44 on the Billboard Hot Country Singles & Tracks chart. In 1988, "Can't Stop Now" reached number 45. The band supported the album by playing shows with Nanci Griffith. Pat Flynn wrote three of the album's songs. "How About You" is a cover of the Jesse Winchester song.

Hold to a Dream was remastered and reissued in 2001 on the Southern Music label.

== Critical reception ==
Professional ratings
Review scores
Source	Rating
AllMusic	3/5 stars
The Philadelphia Inquirer	3/4 stars

The Philadelphia Inquirer wrote that "the bluegrass flavor comes through in the understated songwriting, and the vocals are attractive, if rather pallid." USA Today noted that "these four world-class musicians remain technically dazzling even though they've turned to more catchy material with lots of hooks."

== Track listing ==
1. "Hold to a Dream" (Tim O'Brien) – 3:38
2. "One Way Street" (O'Brien) – 2:50
3. "Can't Stop Now" (Gary Nicholson, Wendy Waldman) – 4:01
4. "I'll Take Tomorrow" (Pat Flynn) – 2:56
5. "Before the Heartache Rolls In" (Radney Foster, Bill Lloyd) – 5:23
6. "Looking Past You" (Flynn) – 2:57
7. "How About You" (Jesse Winchester) – 4:26
8. "Metric Lips" (Béla Fleck) – 4:37
9. "I Can Talk to You" (Flynn) – 3:22
10. "Unconditional Love" (Don Cook, Nicholson) – 3:21

== Personnel ==
- Sam Bush - guitar, mandolin, fiddle, vocals
- Pat Flynn - guitar, vocals
- Béla Fleck - banjo, vocals
- John Cowan - vocals, bass

Additional musicians:

- Eddie Bayers – drums
- Bob Mater – drums
- Tom Roady – percussion

Production notes

- Garth Fundis – producer
- Denny Purcell – mastering
- Bil VornDick – engineer
- Caroline Greyshock – photography
- Henry Marquez – art direction
