= Tin Lily =

Studio album by Jeff Black
- Released: July 26, 2005
- Genre: Americana, bluegrass, folk
- Label: Dualtone

Jeff Black chronology
B-Sides and Confessions, Volume One (2003)	Tin Lily (2005)

Tin Lily is an album by American singer-songwriter Jeff Black, released in 2005.

== Reception ==
Professional ratings
Review scores
Source	Rating
Allmusic	3.5/5 stars

Writing for Allmusic, critic Ronnie D. Lankford, Jr. wrote of the album; "The subtle arrangements of piano, guitar, and organ create a layered underpinning that adds another dimension to a song like "Nineteen" without overpowering it, while the rocking guitar brings a carefree abandon to "Libertine." These shifts in tone also give Tin Lily more variety than 2003's B-Sides and Confessions, Vol. 1, and ultimately make it a more satisfying recording. Black, it seems, has found his comfort zone.."

== Track listing ==
All songs by Jeff Black

1. "Easy On Me" – 2:59
2. "Hollow of Your Hand" – 3:22
3. "Nineteen" – 5:03
4. "Libertine" – 2:54
5. "Free at Last" – 4:47
6. "Hard Way Out" – 4:19
7. "Closer" – 3:15
8. "All Days Shine" – 4:11
9. "Heaven Now" – 4:13
10. "These Days" – 3:22
11. "How Long" – 4:23
12. "A Better Way" – 4:21

== Personnel ==
- Jeff Black – vocals, guitar, piano, keyboards, harmonica
- Sam Bush – fiddle, mandolin
- Craig Wright – drums, percussion
- David Roe – guitar
- Kenny Vaughan – guitar
- David Jacques – double bass
- Kate Campbell – vocals
- Matthew Ryan – vocals

Production notes

- Gary Paczosa – engineer
- Billy Sherrill – engineer
- Joey Turner – assistant engineer
- Paul Mahern – mixing
- Jim DeMain – mastering
- Michael Wilson – photography
- Mike Delevante – art direction, design
