= Too Late to Turn Back Now (album) =

Live album by New Grass Revival
- Released: 1977
- Genre: Progressive bluegrass
- Length: 45:30
- Label: Flying Fish
- Producer: Sam Bush

New Grass Revival chronology
When the Storm is Over (1977)	Too Late to Turn Back Now (1977)	Barren County (1979)

Professional ratings
Review scores
Source	Rating
Allmusic	link

Too Late to Turn Back Now is the title of a 1977 album by the progressive bluegrass band New Grass Revival on the Flying Fish label. It was their first live album, and was recorded at the Telluride Bluegrass Festival.

== Track listing ==
1. "Lonesome and a Long Way from Home" (Delaney Bramlett, Leon Russell) – 5:16
2. "With Care from Someone" (Gene Clark, Doug Dillard, Bernie Leadon) – 8:05
3. "High Lonesome Sound" (Peter Rowan) – 4:04
4. "Rainbow Bridge" (Curtis Burch) – 3:39
5. "Watermelon Man" (Willis Ramsey) – 4:31
6. "Fly Through the Country" (Jimmy Webb) – 8:58
7. "Red Man Blues" (Sam Bush, Courtney Johnson) – 9:47

== Personnel ==
- Sam Bush - mandolin, slide mandolin, fiddle, guitar, electric mandolin, lead vocals
- John Cowan - electric bass, lead vocals
- Courtney Johnson - banjo, vocals
- Curtis Burch - guitar, Dobro, vocals
