= New Grass Revival (1972 album) =

Studio album by New Grass Revival
- Released: 1972
- Recorded: 1972
- Genre: Progressive bluegrass
- Length: 36:23
- Label: Starday

New Grass Revival chronology
New Grass Revival (1972)	Fly Through the Country (1975)

Professional ratings
Review scores
Source	Rating
Allmusic	link

New Grass Revival is the most commonly used title of an album recorded and released in 1972 by the progressive bluegrass band New Grass Revival on the Starday label. This album was also released under the titles The Arrival of the New Grass Revival and Today's Bluegrass.

The New Grass Revival released another album titled New Grass Revival in 1986; due to personnel changes, only Sam Bush was on both.

== Track listing ==
1. "Pennies In My Pocket" (Ebo Walker)
2. "Cold Sailor" (Steve Brines, Jim Smoak)
3. "I Wish I Said (I Love You One More Time)" (Brines, Sam Bush)
4. "Prince of Peace" (Leon Russell)
5. "Ginseng Sullivan" (Norman Blake)
6. "Whisper My Name" (Walker)
7. "Great Balls of Fire" (Otis Blackwell, Jack Hammer)
8. "Lonesome Fiddle Blues" (Vassar Clements)
9. "Body & Soul" (Virginia Stauffer)
10. "With Care From Someone" (Gene Clark, Bernie Leadon, Doug Dillard)

== Personnel ==
- Sam Bush - mandolin, fiddle
- Courtney Johnson - banjo
- Curtis Burch - guitar, Dobro
- Ebo Walker - upright bass
