= Bless My Soul (disambiguation) =

"Bless My Soul" is a song by Powderfinger

Bless My Soul may also refer to:

== Music ==
=== Albums ===
- Bless My Soul (Tom Shaka album), 2002

=== Songs ===
- "Hot Patootie – Bless My Soul", a 1973 song in The Rocky Horror Picture Show soundtrack
- "Bless My Soul", song by Mark Heard from Appalachian Melody
- "Bless My Soul (It's Rock-n-Roll)", by Divinyls from The Collection
- "Bless My Soul", song by Tetra Splendour from Splendid Animation
- "God Bless My Soul", song by Idle Warship from Habits of the Heart
- "Bless My Soul", song by Atlanta Rhythm Section from Dog Days
- "Bless My Soul", song by Nightmares on Wax from Smokers Delight
- "Bless My Soul", song by Jeff Black from B-Sides and Confessions, Volume One
- "Bless My Soul", song by Life written Roger Cotton 1974
- "Bless My Soul", song by The Great Divide 1982
- "Bless My Soul", song by Sha Na Na J. Barry, B. Bloom 1972
