= Foster & Lloyd (album) =

Studio album by Foster & Lloyd
- Released: September 27, 1987
- Recorded: February 28–April, 1987
- Studio: Emerald Sound Studios, Money Pit Studios, and Treasure Isle Recorders Nashville, TN
- Genre: Country
- Length: 33:30
- Label: RCA Nashville
- Producer: Radney Foster; Bill Lloyd

Foster & Lloyd chronology
Foster & Lloyd (1987)	Faster & Llouder (1989)

Singles from Foster & Lloyd
- 1. "Crazy Over You" Released: May 1987; 2. "Sure Thing" Released: September 1987; 3. "Texas in 1880" Released: April 9, 1988; 4. "What Do You Want from Me This Time" Released: August 6, 1988

Foster & Lloyd is the debut studio album by American country music duo Foster & Lloyd. Commercially, It was their most successful album producing three top-ten singles, "Crazy Over You" (#4), "Sure Thing" (#8), and "What Do You Want from Me This Time?" (#6). The other single, "Texas in 1880", peaked at #18 on the Hot Country Songs chart. The album itself peaked at #33 on the Billboard Top Country Albums chart.

"Crazy Over You", while written by Foster & Lloyd, was first recorded by Ricky Van Shelton and released a month earlier on his debut album, Wild-Eyed Dream. His version was not released as a single.

== Track listing ==
All tracks are written by Bill Lloyd and Radney Foster except as noted.

No.	Title	Writer(s)	Length
1.	"Turn Around"		4:22
2.	"Crazy Over You"		4:32
3.	"What Do You Want from Me This Time"		3:17
4.	"Token of Love"	Lloyd	2:37
5.	"Sure Thing"		3:23
6.	"Hard to Say No"		2:40
7.	"Part I Know by Heart"		3:24
8.	"Don't Go Out with Him" (CD only bonus track)		2:58
9.	"Texas in 1880"	Foster	3:58
10.	"You Can Come Cryin' to Me"	Foster	5:14
Total length:			33:26

== Chart performance ==
=== Album ===
Chart (1987)	Peak position
U.S. Billboard Top Country Albums	33

=== Singles ===
Year	Single	Peak positions	
Year	Single	US Country	CAN Country
1987	"Crazy Over You"	4	—
1987	"Sure Thing"	8	8
1988	"Texas in 1880"	18	—
1988	"What Do You Want from Me This Time?"	6	17

== Personnel ==
As listed in liner notes.

=== Foster & Lloyd ===
- Radney Foster - lead vocals, background vocals, guitar
- Bill Lloyd - lead vocals, harmony vocals, guitar, mandolin

=== Musicians ===
- Bruce Bouton - pedal steel guitar, lap steel guitar
- John Cowan - harmony vocals (track 9)
- Vince Gill - electric guitar (track 3)
- Ed Seay - harmony vocals (track 7), engineer
- Tommy Wells - drums
- Glenn Worf - bass guitar
