= The Sky Kings =

American country supergroup (1991–1997)

- Also known as: Four Wheel Drive (1991–1993)
- Origin: Nashville, Tennessee, United States
- Genres: Country
- Years active: 1991–1997
- Labels: RCA Nashville; Warner Bros.
- Past members: John Cowan; Bill Lloyd; Patrick Simmons; Rusty Young

The Sky Kings was an American country music supergroup formed in 1991 as Four Wheel Drive. Originally consisting of John Cowan, Bill Lloyd, Patrick Simmons and Rusty Young, Simmons left the group in 1993.

== History ==
The supergroup, consisting of John Cowan (New Grass Revival), Bill Lloyd (Foster & Lloyd), Patrick Simmons (The Doobie Brothers), and Rusty Young (Poco), was formed in 1991 as Four Wheel Drive. They were signed to a recording deal with RCA Nashville and completed an album for the label which was never released.

Warner Bros. Records signed the group in 1993. Threatened with lawsuits from bands who had copyrighted the name Four Wheel Drive, they secured the rights to the name The Sky Kings. After opening for The Doobie Brothers on their 1993 tour, Simmons left The Sky Kings to rejoin The Doobie Brothers. Now a trio, The Sky Kings released three singles on Warner Bros.: "Picture Perfect," "Fooled Around and Fell in Love" (a cover of the Elvin Bishop hit) and "That Just About Says It All." "Picture Perfect" was the only single to chart, peaking at No. 52 on the Billboard Hot Country Singles & Tracks chart. An eponymous album was scheduled to be released in 1997, but eventually shelved.

In 2000, Rhino Handmade released From Out of the Blue, an album which included the band's entire unreleased 1997 Warner Bros. album, non-album Warner Bros. singles, and recordings and demos made for a second unreleased Warner Bros. album.

== Discography ==
=== Albums ===
Title	Album details
From Out of the Blue	Released: July 26, 2000; Label: Rhino Handmade
1992	Released: December 15, 2014; Label: Sony Music Entertainment

=== Singles ===
Year	Single	Peak chart positions		Album
Year	Single	US Country	CAN Country	Album
1992	"I Could Get Used to This"			1992
1996	"Picture Perfect"	52	84	From Out of the Blue
1996	"Fooled Around and Fell in Love"	—	—	From Out of the Blue
1996	"That Just About Says It All"	—	—	From Out of the Blue
"—" denotes releases that did not chart

=== Music videos ===
Year	Video	Director
1996	"Picture Perfect"	Jon Small
