= Look (Beth Nielsen Chapman album) =

Studio album by Beth Nielsen Chapman
- Released: April 5, 2005
- Genre: Country
- Length: 42:31
- Label: Compass Records

Beth Nielsen Chapman chronology
Hymns (2004)	Look (2005)	Prism (2007)

Professional ratings
Review scores
Source	Rating
AllMusic	4/5 stars
Pop Matters	4/10 stars

Look is the seventh studio album by Beth Nielsen Chapman, released April 5, 2005. It reached number 63 in the UK Albums Chart.

== Critical reception ==
Sue Keogh of the BBC writes "If you like well-crafted music for grown-ups, she's not to be missed. Listening to Beth Nielsen Chapman is like listening to any Mary Chapin Carpenter, Kate Campbell or Sarah McLachlan record; it's your older, more sensible sister talking."

Will Layman of Pop Matters says "Beth Nielsen Chapman is a rare creature; a songwriter first and a performer second. Lots of sensitively expressed feelings here, kids. Nice songs."

== Track listing ==
All tracks are written by Beth Nielsen Chapman, co-writers noted.

No.	Title	Writer(s)	Length
1.	"Trying to Love You"	Bill Lloyd	3:35
2.	"Right Back into the Feeling"	Annie Roboff	3:56
3.	"Look"	Andy Bey	4:16
4.	"Free"	Annie Roboff	3:34
5.	"Touch My Heart"	Matt Rollings	4:04
6.	"Time Won't Tell"	Harlan Howard	4:05
7.	"Will & Liz"	Al Andersen; David Baerwald	4:05
8.	"Who We Are"	Allen Shamblin	4:50
9.	"Your Love Stays"	Eric Kaz	3:06
10.	"The Reason"	David Wilcox	4:17
11.	"I Find Your Love"	Patrick Doyle	2:43
Total length:			42:31

- Track information and credits taken from the album's liner notes.

== Personnel ==
- Beth Nielsen Chapman - vocals, acoustic guitar, mandolin, piano, organ, keyboards, shaker, string arrangements
- Bekka Bramlett - tambourine
- Tom Bukovac - electric guitar, acoustic guitar
- John Catchings - cello
- Ernest Chapman - vocal duet on "Your Love Stays", string arrangements
- Patrick Doyle - string arrangements
- Dan Dugmore - pedal steel guitar, lap steel guitar, dobro
- Bruce Gaitsch - acoustic guitar, electric guitar
- John Jorgenson - acoustic guitar, electric guitar
- Viktor Krauss - bass
- David Leonard - drums
- Bill Lloyd - bass, guitar
- Jerry Marotta - drums
- Michael McDonald - backing vocals
- Chris Pelcer - keyboards, string arrangements
- Andrew Ramsey - acoustic guitar, electric guitar
- Annie Roboff - keyboards, vocals
- Matt Rollings - piano
- Emily Saliers - backing vocals
- Crystal Taliefero - alto saxophone, percussion, vocals
- Kristin Wilkinson - string arrangements
- Reese Wynans - Hammond B3 organ
- Craig Young - bass
