= Laps in Seven =

Studio album by Sam Bush
- Released: June 13, 2006
- Recorded: 2006
- Studio: Sound Emporium (Nashville, Tennessee)
- Genre: Progressive bluegrass
- Length: 55:28
- Label: Sugar Hill
- Producer: Sam Bush

Sam Bush chronology
King of My World (2004)	Laps in Seven (2006)	Circles Around Me (2009)

Laps in Seven is the title of a 2006 album by the progressive bluegrass artist Sam Bush, on the Sugar Hill label.

== Reception ==
Professional ratings
Review scores
Source	Rating
Allmusic	3.5/5 stars
Music Box	3.5/5 stars

In his Allmusic review, music critic Ronnie D. Lankford, Jr. called the album "an eclectic stew, and he has no problem shifting from acoustic to electric, from vocals to instrumentals. Even with this open approach, Bush's music often expresses a "settled" quality that feels rather safe and lacking in soul... Despite these criticisms, Bush can't be accused of sleeping on the job. He always turns out a professional product that pleases fans, and in this fashion, Laps in Seven is no different."

== Track listing ==
1. "The River's Gonna Run" (Julie Miller) - 4:01
2. "Bringing In The Georgia Mail" (Fred Rose) - 3:57
3. "The Dolphin Dance" (Sam Bush) - 3:14
4. "On The Road" (John Hartford) - 5:00
5. "Ridin' That Bluegrass Train" (John Pennell, Sam Bush) - 3:46
6. "I Wanna Do Right" (Jeff Black, Sam Bush) - 4:34
7. "Where There's A Road" (Robbie Fulks) - 3:53
8. "New Country" (Jean-Luc Ponty) - 4:09
9. "Ballad For A Soldier" (Leon Russell) - 4:35
10. "River Take Me" (Darrell Scott) - 7:11
11. "White Bird" (David LaFlamme, Linda LaFlamme) - 6:00
12. "Laps In Seven" (Scott Vestal, Sam Bush, Byron House) - 5:00

== Personnel ==
- Sam Bush - mandolin, fiddle, guitar, vocals
- Keith Sewell - guitar
- Scott Vestal - banjo, banjo synthesizer
- Byron House - bass, vocals
- Chris Brown - drums

Additional personnel:

- Jean-Luc Ponty - electric violin
- Emmylou Harris - vocals
- Shaun Murphy - vocals
- Tim O'Brien - vocals
- Andrea Zonn - vocals
