= Circles Around Me =

Studio album by Sam Bush
- Released: October 20, 2009
- Genre: Bluegrass
- Label: Sugar Hill

Sam Bush chronology
Laps in Seven (2006)	Circles Around Me (2009)	Storyman (2016)

Circles Around Me is an album by American bluegrass mandolin player Sam Bush, released through Sugar Hill Records in October 2009.

== Reception ==
Professional ratings
Review scores
Source	Rating
Allmusic	3.5/5 stars

The album earned Bush a Grammy Award nomination for Best Bluegrass Album.

In his Allmusic review, music critic William Ruhlman wrote that the album "makes a good demonstration of Sam Bush's continuing mastery of the mandolin and his own niche in the bluegrass scene."

== Track listing ==
1. "Circles Around Me" (Jeff Black, Sam Bush) – 3:55
2. "Diamond Joe" (Traditional) – 3:40
3. "You Left Me Alone" (Tom Gray, Jerry Stuart) – 3:07
4. "The Old North Woods" (Bush) – 4:10
5. "Roll on Buddy, Roll On" (Teddy Wilburn, Doyle Wilburn) – 2:41
6. "The Ballad of Stringbean and Estelle" (Bush, Guy Clark, Verlon Thompson) – 4:45
7. "Blue Mountain" (Bush) – 6:09
8. "Out on the Ocean" (Pete Kuykendall) – 2:54
9. "Gold Heart Locket" (Black) – 4:17
10. "Junior Heywood" (Bush, Edgar Meyer) – 6:36
11. "Midnight on the Stormy Deep" (Traditional) – 3:52
12. "Apple Blossom" (Traditional) – 1:35
13. "Souvenir Bottles" (Bush, John Cowan, Stephen F. Brines) – 8:23
14. "Whisper My Name/Hot Tamales" (Ebo Walker) – 7:23

== Personnel ==
- Jerry Douglas - resonator guitar
- Cornelia Heard - violin
- Byron House - acoustic bass, electric bass
- Courtney Johnson - banjo
- Del McCoury - guitar, vocals
- Edgar Meyer - bass
- George Meyer - violin
- Stephen Mougin - guitar, mandolin, vocals
- Scott Vestal - banjo
