= Too Late to Turn Back Now =

Too Late to Turn Back may refer to:

- Too Late to Turn Back Now (album), a 1977 album by New Grass Revival
- "Too Late to Turn Back Now" (song), a 1972 song by Cornelius Brothers & Sister Rose
