= Storyman (album) =

Studio album by Sam Bush
- Released: June 24, 2016
- Genre: Newgrass, progressive bluegrass, outlaw bluegrass
- Length: 46:45
- Label: Sugar Hill
- Producer: Sam Bush

Sam Bush chronology
Circles Around Me (2009)	Storyman (2016)

Professional ratings
Review scores
Source	Rating
AllMusic	4/5 stars

Storyman is an album by the bluegrass mandolin player Sam Bush released by Sugar Hill Records on June 24, 2016. The album release show was in Nashville, Tennessee at the City Winery on July 23, 2016.

"Carcinoma Blues" was written by Guy Clark and Sam Bush. "Hand Mics Killed Country Music" features Bush and Emmylou Harris. Bush and Harris co-wrote the song. "Transcendental Meditation Blues" was co-written with long time collaborator Jeff Black.

== Track listing ==
No.	Title	Writer(s)	Length
1.	"Play By Your Own Rules"	Sam Bush, Stephen Mougin	3:31
2.	"Everything Is Possible" (with Deborah Holland (harmony vocals))	Deborah Holland, Sam Bush	4:01
3.	"Transcendental Meditation Blues"	Jeff Black / Sam Bush	3:53
4.	"Greenbrier"	Sam Bush, Scott Vestal	4:48
5.	"Lefty's Song" (with Alison Krauss (harmony vocals) and Donnie Sundal (organ))	Sam Bush, Steve Brines	3:57
6.	"Carcinoma Blues" (with Hargus "Pig" Robbins (piano))	Guy Clark, Sam Bush	3:56
7.	"Bowling Green"	Jon Randall Stewart, Sam Bush	3:32
8.	"Handmics Killed Country Music" (with Emmylou Harris (harmony vocals), Hargus "Pig" Robbins (piano), and Steve Fishell (pedal steel guitar))	Emmylou Harris, Sam Bush	3:43
9.	"Where's My Love"	John Pennell, Sam Bush	5:54
10.	"It's Not What You Think"	Chris Brown, Sam Bush, Scott Vestal, Stephen Mougin, Todd Parks	3:54
11.	"I Just Wanna Feel Something"	Jon Randall Stewart, Sam Bush	5:36

== Personnel ==
- Sam Bush - vocals, guitar, mandolin, fiddle
- Stephen Mougin - vocals, guitar
- Todd Parks - vocals, electric bass
- Scott Vestal - banjo
- Chris Brown - drums
