= On the Boulevard =

On The Boulevard

Studio album by New Grass Revival
- Released: 1984
- Genre: Progressive bluegrass
- Length: 37:34
- Label: Sugar Hill Records
- Producer: Garth Fundis

New Grass Revival chronology
Live (1984)	On The Boulevard (1984)	New Grass Revival (1986)

Professional ratings
Review scores
Source	Rating
AllMusic	link

On the Boulevard is the sixth studio album by the progressive bluegrass band New Grass Revival, released in 1984. It is the first of four studio albums from the group's last lineup.

== Track listing ==
1. "On The Boulevard" (Pat Flynn) - 4:10
2. "Earth, Water, Wind, and Fire" (Bob Lucas) - 3:46
3. "You're The Best Friend That I've Known" (R. Cook, P. Donnelly) - 2:58
4. "Just Is" (John Cowan) - 2:25
5. "County Clare" (Béla Fleck) - 4:08
6. "One More Love Song" (Leon Russell) - 3:19
7. "You Don't Knock" (W. Westbrook/C.a. Walton) - 2:33
8. "One Of These Trains" (Pat Flynn, D. Rommereim) - 3:48
9. "Get In The Wind" (G. Place) - 3:01
10. "Indian Hills" (Sam Bush) - 5:37
11. "One Love/People Get Ready" (Bob Marley, C. Mayfield) - 3:51
12. "Where Do I Go From Here" (L. Carroll) - 5:52
13. "Walkin' In Jerusalem" (Traditional) - 3:05

== Personnel ==
- Sam Bush – guitar, mandolin, fiddle, vocals
- Pat Flynn – guitar, vocals
- Béla Fleck – banjo, vocals
- John Cowan – vocals, bass

Additional musicians:

- Eddie Bayers – drums
- Bob Mater – drums
- Tom Roady – percussion

Production notes

- Garth Fundis – producer
- Denny Purcell – mastering
- Bil VornDick – engineer
- Caroline Greyshock – photography
- Henry Marquez – art direction
