= Linda Waterfall =

American singer-songwriter

- Born: 1949; Illinois, U.S.
- Origin: Seattle, WA
- Died: January 8, 2019 (aged 69); Seattle, Washington, U.S.
- Genres: Folk, choral, folk-rock
- Occupation: Singer-songwriter
- Instrument(s): Guitar, keyboards, bass
- Years active: 1971–2019
- Formerly of: Entropy Service, Skyboys
- Website: www.lindawaterfall.com

Linda Waterfall (1949 – January 8, 2019) was an American folk musician and singer-songwriter active for 38 years. Highly revered in the Seattle folk scene for her songwriting and guitarwork, she released 13 albums across her career. Dubbed "the musical mistress of the eclectic" by James Bush, her songs incorporated her classical background with American and European folk, in addition to influence from jazz, rock, blues, and gospel. Her songs often contained themes of environmentalism, nature, and romance.

== Biography ==
Waterfall grew up in a family of classical musicians in Wilmette, Illinois, and began studying piano at the age of eight and learned guitar in high school. Her parents (both musicians) discouraged her from a musical career. She graduated from Stanford University in 1971 with a degree in visual art. While at Stanford, Waterfall became a member of Phi Beta Kappa. In 1973, she was invited to play at Evergreen State College, where she formed the band pre-grunge band Entropy Service. She then joined the Skyboys on bass. Against her parents' advice, Waterfall began a career in music. She moved to Seattle in 1975 and released her first album, Mary's Garden, on her own label Trout two years later. It was also issued on Windham Hill. She received multiple honors throughout her career, including being named Seattle's Top Songwriter by the Seattle Times and Weekly.

She taught composition and song-writing at Cornish College of the Arts in Seattle from 2004 to 2012 and worked as an artist-in-residence for the Washington State Arts Commission. She also composed many choral pieces for the Seattle Arts Commission and Mt. Madonna Choir. Waterfall spent several years as a student of Baba Hari Dass and studied Transcendental Meditation, a daily practice for her until her death.

Waterfall was married twice. She was married to Scott Nygaard for seven years, recording the album Everything Looks Different with him in 1983. She was married to her second spouse, Bob Earle, from 1996 until his death in 2016. The couple lived in Wallingford in Seattle and also owned a cabin in Forks, Washington.

Waterfall released her final album, Hometown Girl, in 2015 to critical acclaim. She died on January 8, 2019, at the University of Washington Medical Center in Seattle after a two-year battle with cancer.

== Discography ==
- Mary's Garden (1977, Windham Hill)
- My Heart Sings (1979, Trout)
- Bananaland (1981, Trout)
- Everything Looks Different with Scott Nygaard (1983, Trout)
- Body English (1987, Flying Fish)
- A Little Bit at a Time (1991, Flying Fish)
- Flying Time (1994, Trout)
- In the Presence of the Light (1998, Trout/Liquid City)
- That Art Thou: Songs from the Vedas (2002, Trout)
- Place of Refuge (2006, Trout)
- Songs From the Dao de Jing (2007, Trout)
- Welcome to the Dark (2009)
- Hometown Girl (2015, Franklin Point)

Other Appearances

- Entropy Service (1974) with Peter Langston, J.B. White, Judith Cook
- A Musical Doorway (2000, Various Artists) Produced by Seattle Folklore Society
