= Texas in 1880 =

Single by Foster & Lloyd

from the album Foster & Lloyd
- B-side: "Token of Love"
- Released: April 9, 1988
- Genre: Country
- Length: 3:58
- Label: RCA Nashville
- Songwriter(s): Radney Foster
- Producer(s): Radney Foster, Bill Lloyd

Foster & Lloyd singles chronology
"Sure Thing" (1987)	"Texas in 1880" (1988)	"What Do You Want from Me This Time" (1988)

"Texas in 1880" is a song written by Radney Foster, and recorded by American country music duo Foster & Lloyd. It was released in April 1988 as the third single from the album Foster & Lloyd. The song reached #18 on the Billboard Hot Country Singles & Tracks chart.

In 2001, Foster covered it with Pat Green on the album Are You Ready for the Big Show? This version peaked at number 54 on the country charts.

== Chart performance ==
=== Foster & Lloyd ===
Chart (1988)	Peak position
US Hot Country Songs (Billboard)	18

=== Radney Foster with Pat Green ===
Chart (2001)	Peak position
US Hot Country Songs (Billboard)	54
