= Crazy Over You =

Single by Foster & Lloyd

from the album Foster & Lloyd
- B-side: "The Part I Know by Heart"
- Released: May 1987
- Genre: Country
- Length: 4:32
- Label: RCA Nashville 5210
- Songwriters: Radney Foster, Bill Lloyd
- Producers: Radney Foster; Bill Lloyd

Foster & Lloyd singles chronology
"Crazy Over You" (1987)	"Sure Thing" (1987)

"Crazy Over You" is a debut song recorded by American country music duo Foster & Lloyd, who also wrote the song. It was released in May 1987 as the first single from their self-titled debut album. It was their most successful single, peaking at #4 on the Billboard Hot Country Songs chart in 1987. The song was simultaneously recorded and released by Ricky Van Shelton on his debut album, Wild-Eyed Dream.

== Chart performance ==
Chart (1987)	Peak position
US Hot Country Songs (Billboard)	4
