= Trying to Love You =

2005 song by Beth Nielsen Chapman

Song by Beth Nielsen Chapman

from the album Look
- Released: April 5, 2005
- Genre: Country; contemporary folk
- Length: 3:35
- Label: Compass
- Songwriter(s): Beth Nielsen Chapman; Bill Lloyd
- Producer(s): Beth Nielsen Chapman; Peter Collins; Annie Roboff

"Trying to Love You" is a song written by singer-songwriters Beth Nielsen Chapman and Bill Lloyd. It was originally recorded by Chapman herself for her 2005 studio album, Look. The same year, American country artist Trisha Yearwood included a version on her 2005 studio album, Jasper County. It was eventually spawned as the second single from the album and became a charting Billboard hit on two charts. It received positive reception from music critics and writers.

== Background and release ==
"Trying to Love You" was originally composed by Beth Nielsen Chapman and Bill Lloyd. In 2004, Chapman recorded the song at several studios located in Franklin, Tennessee and Nashville, Tennessee. The sessions were co-produced by Chapman, Peter Collins and Annie Roboff. The session featured Bill Lloyd playing acoustic guitar in the background. Chapman played several instruments for the song's recording, including the mandolin and guitar. "Trying to Love You" was released on Chapman's studio album Look, which was issued on April 5, 2005, on Compass Records. It was not originally released as a single. In his review of Look, Thom Jurek of Allmusic called the track "an awesome testament to the graininess of love's stages in the everyday life of a committed couple."

== Personnel ==
All credits are adapted from the liner notes of Look.

Musical personnel

- Bruce Gaitsch – rhythm guitar
- Bill Lloyd – acoustic guitar, bass
- David Leonard – drums
- Jerry Marotta – drums
- Beth Nielsen Chapman – arm shaker, lead vocals, guitar, B3 hammond organ, mandolin,

== Trisha Yearwood version ==
"Trying to Love You"

Single by Trisha Yearwood

from the album Jasper County
- Released: November 2005
- Studio: Sound Emporium (Nashville, Tennessee)
- Genre: Country; contemporary country
- Length: 3:46
- Label: MCA Nashville
- Songwriter(s): Beth Nielsen Chapman; Bill Lloyd
- Producer(s): Garth Fundis

Trisha Yearwood singles chronology
"Georgia Rain" (2005)	"Trying to Love You" (2005)	"Heaven, Heartache and the Power of Love" (2007)

=== Background ===
In 2005, Trisha Yearwood released her first new collection of songs in several years. Her previous studio effort, Inside Out, was released in 2001 and produced the hit single "I Would've Loved You Anyway." Among the songs chosen for her new project would be "Trying to Love You." The song was cut in 2005 at the Sound Emporium Studios, located in Nashville, Tennessee. The session was produced by Garth Fundis, who was Yearwood's long-time producer. Additional sides for her upcoming album were also recorded during the same session.

=== Critical reception ===
"Trying to Love You" received positive reviews from critics and writers. Stephen Thomas Erlewine of Allmusic praised the song when reviewing Yearwood's 2005 album and compared it to that of her other 2005 hit: "...even those sweeping slow tunes are offset by such excellent ballads as the heartbroken "Trying to Love You" and the epic "Georgia Rain," which are pure country and lend the overall album a sweet, reflective quality." In September 2005, the song also received positive commentary from Billboard magazine when reviewing the same album. In comparison to the rest of the album, critics called it "achingly poignant."

=== Release and chart performance ===
"Trying to Love You" was originally released as an album track on Yearwood's 2005 studio album, Jasper County. The record was released on September 13, 2005, via MCA Nashville Records and included her previous hit, "Georgia Rain." "Trying to Love You" was spawned as the second and final single from Jasper County in 2005. The song entered the Billboard Hot Country Songs chart in late 2005 and spent seven weeks on the chart, peaking at number 52 in December. It was Yearwood's sixth charting single to miss the Billboard country top 40. It was also her first to enter the Billboard adult contemporary songs chart. Spending, seven weeks on the chart, it peaked at number 28 in April 2006. A music video was released in 2005 as well, directed by Randee St. Nicolas.

=== Track listing ===
CD single

(Single repeats three times, according to cover art)

- "Trying to Love You" – 3:46
- "Trying to Love You" – 3:46
- "Trying to Love You" – 3:46

=== Charts ===
Chart (2005–2006)	Peak position
US Adult Contemporary (Billboard)	28
US Hot Country Songs (Billboard)	52
