= Hotmud Family =

American folk and bluegrass band

The Hotmud Family was an American folk, old-time, and bluegrass string band based in Dayton, Ohio. They were active from 1970 to 1984, holding a brief reunion in 2010. They recorded six LP records, four of which were re-released in a two-CD set in 2010. One of the members, Rick Good, has continued playing music.

== History ==
The original band members were Suzanne Thomas, Rick Good, and Dave Edmundson. Their interest in the country music of the 1920s and 1930s, boosted by the success of the New Lost City Ramblers, inspired them to study the recordings of pre-World War II artists such as the Carter Family, Uncle Dave Macon, Jimmie Rodgers, the Delmore Brothers, and the Skillet Lickers.

They were regular performers at string music festivals in the 1970s, playing hundreds of dates with an entertaining stage show and an unusual "mix of old time and bluegrass influences." Between 1974 and 1978, the Hotmuds recorded four LPs for Vetco Records in Cincinnati. During their 14-year run, they were known as "the old-time band that could sing."

In 1981, Flying Fish Records released the Hotmuds LP Meat and Potatoes & Stuff Like That. Among its 15 tracks was "Dust Eatin' Cowboys", a song honoring the simple cowboys of the American West. Members of the Western Writers of America chose it as one of the Top 100 Western songs of all time.

In 2010, Vetco released a two-CD set containing 55 tracks from their LPs and a 20-page booklet about the band. To celebrate the release, the Hotmuds temporarily reunited, playing two concerts in Dayton.

== Discography ==
Solo

- Stone Mountain Wobble (Vetco Records LP 503, 1974)
- Til We Meet Here Again, Or Above (Vetco Records, 1974)
- Buckeyes In The Briar Patch (Vetco Records, 1976)
- Years In The Making (Vetco Records, LP 513, 1978)
- Live, As We Know It (Flying Fish FF087, 1979)
- Meat And Potatoes & Stuff Like That (Flying Fish FF251, 1981)

With Fiddlin' Van Kidwell

- Fiddlin' Van Kidwell With The Hotmud Family (Vetco Records LP 502, 740420, 1974)
- Midnight Ride (Vetco Records LP 506, 750765, 1975)

Compilations

- The Complete Vetco Recordings (Not On Label, 2010)
