= Friday Night in America =

Album by New Grass Revival

Studio album by New Grass Revival
- Released: 1989
- Genres: Bluegrass, country
- Length: 40:54
- Label: Capitol
- Producer: Wendy Waldman

New Grass Revival chronology
Hold to a Dream (1987)	Friday Night in America (1989)	Best of New Grass Revival (1994)

Friday Night in America is a studio album by progressive bluegrass band New Grass Revival, released in 1989. The album includes the single "Callin' Baton Rouge", the band's only Top 40 hit on Hot Country Songs. Both it and "Do What You Gotta Do" were later released as singles by Garth Brooks: the former in 1993 from his album In Pieces, and the latter in 2000 from his album Sevens. The band promoted the album by touring with Emmylou Harris.

== Critical reception ==
Professional ratings
Review scores
Source	Rating
AllMusic	2.5/5 stars

Newsday deemed the band "one of the more exuberant and professional amalgams of country and bluegrass talent." USA Today called the album "the best yet from the best acoustic band around... Bluegrass never has been stretched so far toward jazz, folk, blues, Cajun, reggae and rock." The Edmonton Journal wrote that the "superb instrumental skills are reduced to the odd flash of brilliance, as most of the material embraces standard Poco/Eagle country arrangements."

== Track listing ==
No.	Title	Writer(s)	Length
1.	"Friday Night in America"	Pat Flynn, Russell Smith	3:55
2.	"You Plant Your Fields"	Wendy Waldman, Donny Lowery	3:11
3.	"Let's Make a Baby King"	Jesse Winchester	3:30
4.	"Do What You Gotta Do"	Pat Flynn	3:30
5.	"Let Me Be Your Man"	Kim Ritchey	3:04
6.	"Lila"	Pat Flynn	3:38
7.	"Callin' Baton Rouge"	Dennis Linde	2:39
8.	"Whatever Way the Wind Blows"	Marshall Crenshaw	2:54
9.	"Big Foot"	Béla Fleck	7:54
10.	"Angel Eyes"	John Hiatt, Fred Koller	4:28
11.	"I'm Down"	John Lennon, Paul McCartney	2:11
Total length:			40:54

== Personnel ==
- Sam Bush – fiddle, mandolin, guitar, vocals
- John Cowan – bass guitar, vocals
- Béla Fleck – banjo, vocals
- Pat Flynn – guitar, vocals

Additional musicians and staff

- Eddie Bayers – drums
- Garth Fundis – backing vocals
- Caroline Greyshock – photography
- Bob Mater – drums
- Denny Purcell – mastering engineer
- Gary Laney – recording engineer, mixing
- Tom Roady – percussion
- Wendy Waldman – backing vocals, producer
