= Birmingham Road =

Studio album by Jeff Black
- Released: 1998
- Genres: Americana, bluegrass, folk
- Length: 60:08
- Label: Arista
- Producers: Susan Rogers, Ben Grosse

Jeff Black chronology
Birmingham Road (1998)	Honey and Salt (2003)

Birmingham Road is the debut album by American singer-songwriter Jeff Black, released in 1998.

Members of the band Wilco back Black on the album. Iris DeMent is also a guest singer.

== Reception ==
Professional ratings
Review scores
Source	Rating
AllMusic	4/5 stars

No Depression wrote: "On the one hand, his insistence on writing about big themes, often in metaphor, is the most inviting part of his art; but on the other hand, it’s also the main obstacle to the admirable dreams and emotions of his work."

Writing for AllMusic, critic James Chrispell noted that Black "is a sincere singer/songwriter who puts a lot of feeling and emotion into his work, and the results are some of the best music released in the late 90s... For music lovers of all shapes and sizes, take a walk down Birmingham Road with Jeff Black. It'll feel like you've come home again."

== Track listing ==
All songs by Jeff Black

1. "A Long Way to Go" – 4:01
2. "What Do I Want" – 4:25
3. "Birmingham Road" – 5:21
4. "That's Just About Right" – 5:50
5. "Noah's Ark" – 6:21
6. "King of the World " – 3:57
7. "Uniontown" – 5:17
8. "Ghosts in the Graveyard" – 5:23
9. "Nebo Hill" – 4:53
10. "Sheet" – 4:00
11. "Carnival Song" – 4:56
12. "The Valley" – 5:44

== Personnel ==
- Jeff Black – vocals, guitar, harmonica, background vocals
- Tionno Banks – organ, piano
- Randy Jacobs – guitar, mandoguitar
- Ken Coomer – drums, bongos
- Jay Bennett – organ, guitar, piano, accordion, background vocals, Farfisa organ
- Curt Bisquera – drums
- Tommy Jordan – percussion, organ, steel drums, background vocals, dulcimer
- Suzie Katayama – cello
- Greg Kurstin – Mini Moog
- Lance Morrison – bass
- John Stirratt – bass, drums
- Greg Wells – guitar, organ, bass, percussion, piano, accordion
- Marlon Young – guitar
- Iris DeMent – background vocals

Production

- Ben Grosse – producer, engineer, mixing
- Susan Rogers – producer, engineer
- Aaron Lepley – assistant engineer
- Boo Macleod – assistant engineer
- Michael "Elvis" Baskette – assistant engineer, mixing assistant
- Jim Champagne – assistant engineer
- Bob Ludwig – mastering
- Jack Joseph Puig – mixing
- Michael Tuller – programming, engineer
- Maude Gilman – art direction
- Michael Wilson – photography
