= Fair Shake =

Single by Foster & Lloyd

from the album Faster & Llouder
- B-side: "After I'm Gone"
- Released: January 28, 1989
- Genre: Country
- Length: 3:26
- Label: RCA Nashville
- Songwriters: Radney Foster, Bill Lloyd, Guy Clark
- Producers: Radney Foster, Bill Lloyd, Rick Will

Foster & Lloyd singles chronology
"What Do You Want from Me This Time" (1988)	"Fair Shake" (1989)	"Before the Heartache Rolls In" (1989)

"Fair Shake" is a song by American country music duo Foster & Lloyd. It was released in January 1989 as the first single from the album Faster & Llouder. The song reached #5 on the Billboard Hot Country Singles & Tracks chart. The song was written by Radney Foster, Bill Lloyd and Guy Clark.

== Chart performance ==
Chart (1989)	Peak position
Canada Country Singles (RPM)	5
US Hot Country Songs (Billboard)	5

=== Year-end charts ===
Chart (1989)	Position
Canada Country Tracks (RPM)	86
US Country Songs (Billboard)	93
