= What Do You Want from Me This Time =

Single by Foster & Lloyd

from the album Foster & Lloyd
- B-side: "Don't Go Out with Him"
- Released: August 6, 1988
- Genre: Country
- Length: 3:16
- Label: RCA Nashville
- Songwriter(s): Radney Foster, Bill Lloyd
- Producer(s): Radney Foster, Bill Lloyd

Foster & Lloyd singles chronology
"Texas in 1880" (1988)	"What Do You Want from Me This Time" (1988)	"Fair Shake" (1989)

"What Do You Want from Me This Time" is a song written and recorded by American country music duo Foster & Lloyd. It was released in August 1988 as the fourth single from the album Foster & Lloyd. The song reached #6 on the Billboard Hot Country Singles & Tracks chart.

== Charts ==
=== Weekly charts ===
Chart (1988)	Peak position
US Hot Country Songs (Billboard)	6
Canadian RPM Country Tracks	17

=== Year-end charts ===
Chart (1988)	Position
US Hot Country Songs (Billboard)	74
