= Sure Thing (Foster & Lloyd song) =

Single by Foster & Lloyd

from the album Foster & Lloyd
- B-side: "Hard to Say No"
- Released: September 1987
- Genre: Country
- Length: 3:23
- Label: RCA Nashville 5281
- Songwriter(s): Radney Foster, Bill Lloyd
- Producer(s): Radney Foster; Bill Lloyd

Foster & Lloyd singles chronology
"Crazy Over You" (1987)	"Sure Thing" (1987)	"Texas in 1880" (1988)

"Sure Thing" is a song written and recorded by American country music duo Foster & Lloyd. It was released in September 1987 as the second single from their self-titled debut album. It reached number 8 on both the Billboard Hot Country Songs chart and the Canadian RPM country Tracks chart in 1987.

== Chart performance ==
Chart (1987–1988)	Peak position
US Hot Country Songs (Billboard)	8
Canadian RPM Country Tracks	8
