= B-Sides and Confessions, Volume One =

Compilation album by Jeff Black
- Released: 2003
- Genre: Americana, folk
- Label: Razor & Tie
- Producer: Jeff Black

Jeff Black chronology
Honey and Salt (2003)	B-Sides and Confessions, Volume One (2003)	Tin Lily (2005)

B-Sides and Confessions, Volume One is an album by American singer-songwriter Jeff Black, released in 2003.

== Reception ==
Professional ratings
Review scores
Source	Rating
Allmusic	3.5/5 stars

Writing for Allmusic, critic Ronnie D. Lankford, Jr. wrote of the album; "These songs are brought to fullness by simple arrangements and a straightforward production... The only snag on B-Sides and Confessions is that most of the songs are fairly slow paced, which causes the last two-thirds of the album to blend together. The album nonetheless succeeds in offering a singer-songwriter effort that doesn't fall into the usual singer-songwriter clichés."

== Track listing ==
All songs by Jeff Black

1. "Slip" – 2:46
2. "Same Old River" – 5:05
3. "Holy Roller" – 2:44
4. "Sunday Best" – 5:06
5. "To Be With You" – 4:55
6. "Gold Heart Locket" – 4:05
7. "Cakewalk" – 5:44
8. "Bless My Soul" – 4:19
9. "Bastard" – 4:57
10. "Higher Ground" – 6:26

== Personnel ==
- Jeff Black – vocals, guitar, piano, keyboards, harmonica
- Byron House – bass
- David Jacques – double bass
- Michael Webb – bass
- Craig Wright – drums, percussion

Production notes

- Jeff Black – producer, art direction, design
- Gary Paczosa – engineer ("To Be With You")
- Billy Sherrill – engineer, mixing
- Jim DeMain – mastering
- Michael Wilson – photography
