= New Grass Revival (1986 album) =

Studio album by New Grass Revival
- Released: 1986
- Genre: Progressive bluegrass
- Length: 37:34
- Label: Capitol
- Producer: Garth Fundis

New Grass Revival chronology
On the Boulevard (1984)	New Grass Revival (1986)	Hold to a Dream (1987)

Professional ratings
Review scores
Source	Rating
AllMusic	link

New Grass Revival is the seventh studio album by the progressive bluegrass band New Grass Revival, released in 1986.

== Track listing ==
1. "What You Do To Me" (Hall)
2. "Love Someone Like Me" (Holly Dunn, Radney Foster)
3. "Lonely Rider" (Flynn)
4. "Sweet Release" (Flynn)
5. "How Many Hearts" (Flynn)
6. "In The Middle of the Night" (Flynn)
7. "Saw You Running" (Thom Moore)
8. "Ain´t That Peculiar" (Pete Moore, Robinson, Rogers)
9. "Seven By Seven" (Fleck)
10. "Revival" (Rowan)

== Personnel ==
- Sam Bush – guitar, mandolin, fiddle, vocals
- Pat Flynn – guitar, vocals
- Béla Fleck – banjo, vocals
- John Cowan – vocals, bass

Additional musicians:

- Eddie Bayers – drums
- Bob Mater – drums
- Tom Roady – percussion

Production notes

- Garth Fundis – producer
- Denny Purcell – mastering
- Gary Laney – engineer
- Caroline Greyshock – photography
- Henry Marquez – art direction

== Chart performance ==
Chart (1986)	Peak position
U.S. Billboard Top Country Albums	66
