= Jeff Black (singer) =

American singer-songwriter

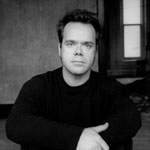

Background information
- Born: Jeff Black; December 3, 1962 (age 63)
- Origin: Kansas City, Missouri
- Genres: Americana, bluegrass, folk
- Occupations: Singer-songwriter, recording artist, producer
- Instruments: Vocals, guitar, piano, harmonica, banjo
- Years active: 1980s–present
- Labels: Arista, Arista Austin, Dualtone, Lotos Nile
- Website: jeffblack.com

Jeff Black is an American singer-songwriter originally from Kansas City, Missouri, and now based in Nashville, Tennessee. His writings have been described in the Allmusic as "impressionistic songs that are smart without forgetting the emotional undercurrent." His songs have been covered by Alison Krauss, Waylon Jennings, Sam Bush, Jerry Douglas and BlackHawk. BlackHawk's cover of Black's song, "That's Just About Right," was a Top 10 Country single in 1996. BlackHawk's cover of Black's song, "King of the World" was a Top 30 Country single in 1998. Black also co-wrote the title track "Circles Around Me" with Sam Bush for his 2009 Grammy-nominated album Circles Around Me. Black has released 10 of his own self-produced albums and tours widely. He is also recognized as a digital music pioneer by NPR for his podcast, Black Tuesdays.

== Biography ==
Jeff Black was born on December 3, 1962, in Kansas City, Missouri, and grew up in Liberty, Missouri. Black received his first guitar as a present for his tenth birthday. In his twenties Black began performing at Blayney's, a Kansas City blues club where he also worked as a bouncer. Soon Black began touring and eventually relocated to Nashville, Tennessee, where he re-connected with Kansas City friend, Iris DeMent (Black lends some backing vocals on DeMent's 1992 debut album, Infamous Angel).

Black's own first album, Birmingham Road, was recorded with the members of the band Wilco, minus lead singer, Jeff Tweedy. The songs have been described as "fine portraits of American life without the sappiness or self-consciousness often attributed to the singer/songwriter genre."

== Discography ==
- Birmingham Road (1998 Arista)
- Honey and Salt (2003 Lotos Nile Music)
- B-Sides and Confessions, Volume One (2003 Lotos Nile Music)
- Tin Lily (2005 Lotos Nile Music)
- Sleepy Town (2007 Lotos Nile Music)
- Mining For Gold (2008 Lotos Nile Music)
- Christmas Sunshine (2009 Lotos Nile Music)
- Plow Through The Mystic (2011 Lotos Nile Music)
- B-Sides and Confessions, Volume Two (2013 Lotos Nile Music)
- Folklore (2014 Lotos Nile Music)
- A Walk in the Sun (2020 Lotos Nile Music)

== Singles ==
- "Birmingham Road" (1998), Birmingham Road
- "That's Just About Right" (1998), Birmingham Road
