= Johnny Staats =

- Origin: West Virginia, USA
- Genres: Bluegrass
- Occupation(s): Driver for United Parcel Service, musician
- Instrument(s): Mandolin, guitar, violin
- Years active: 1996–present
- Website: www.johnnystaats.com

Johnny Staats is a bluegrass mandolin, guitar and violin player, born and raised in West Virginia. He has been featured on NBC's Today Show, in People Magazine, on the CBS Evening News and CNN, and has appeared on the Grand Ole Opry. He won Charleston's Vandalia Gathering-Mandolin championships in 1996, 1997, and 1999. In 1997 he also won the guitar title and placed third in the fiddle competition.

He is an avid raccoon hunter. His Johnny Staats Bluegrass Festival is a part of the Parkersburg (W.Va.) homecoming every year. He supports local instrument makers by playing ones made in the Parkersburg area. He lives in Sandyville, West Virginia.

Current members of Johnny Staats band

“The Delivery Boys” are Butch Osborne on banjo, Ray Cossin on fiddle and vocals, Doug Cossin on guitar and vocals, David Vaughn on bass and vocals

== Discography ==
- Wires & Wood (credited to "The Johnny Staats Project"), Giant Records, 2000
- Pickin Up Steam (with Robert Shafer), 2004
- Wound for Sound (credited to "Johnny Staats & the Delivery Boys")
- Homecoming Favorites (with Robert Shafer), 2007
- Time Moves On (Johnny Staats & The Delivery Boys), 2013
- Music From The Mountains (Johnny Staats & Robert Shafer) 2016
