= Foster & Lloyd =

American country music duo

- Origin: Nashville, Tennessee, U.S.
- Genre: Country
- Years active: 1986–1990, 2010–2011
- Labels: RCA, Effin El
- Past members: Radney Foster; Bill Lloyd

Foster & Lloyd was an American country music duo consisting of singer-songwriters Radney Foster and Bill Lloyd. After pairing up in 1986, the duo recorded three albums for RCA Records, charting nine singles on the Billboard country charts. The highest-peaking of these was their debut single "Crazy Over You", a No. 4 hit in 1987. After disbanding in 1990, Foster and Lloyd began solo careers. They reunited in 2010 to release a fourth studio album.

== Description and history ==
Foster & Lloyd was founded in 1986 by Radney Foster and Bill Lloyd, both of whom are songwriters, vocalists, and guitarists.

They met while employed at MTM publishing in Nashville. They co-wrote the country hit "Since I Found You" in 1986 for Sweethearts of the Rodeo before obtaining their own record deal. Their self-titled debut LP produced five hit singles on the U.S. Billboard country music charts. Follow-up albums, Faster & Llouder (1989) and Version of the Truth (1990) were less successful. After the third record, they parted ways and embarked on solo careers. They reunited in 2010 and released a fourth studio album in May 2011.

In 1987, while still a member of the duo, Lloyd released his debut solo album, Feeling the Elephant. The album's power pop style greatly differed from that of Foster & Lloyd, and was critically acclaimed but commercially unsuccessful. Following the disbanding of the group, Lloyd released a second album, Set to Pop.

== Style ==
They were hailed by critics for their tasteful blend of popular country and rock and roll. Foster described their style "a country garage band" which is "harking back to what was best in music in the '50s and '60s and making it part of the '80s." Their musical style combined Foster's plainspoken lyrics with Lloyd's virtuoso guitar licks and power pop sensibilities.

== Discography ==
=== Studio albums ===
| Title | Album details | Peak chart positions | |
| Title | Album details | US Country | US |
|---|---|---|---|
| Foster & Lloyd | Release date: September 27, 1987; Label: RCA Records | 33 | — |
| Faster & Llouder | Release date: April 4, 1989; Label: RCA Records | 44 | 142 |
| Version of the Truth | Release date: May 12, 1990; Label: RCA Records | 40 | — |
| It's Already Tomorrow | Release date: May 17, 2011; Label: 'Effin 'Ell Records | — | — |
"—" denotes releases that did not chart

=== Compilations ===
| Title | Album details |
|---|---|
| The Essential Foster and Lloyd | Release date: April 16, 1996; Label: RCA Records |

=== Singles ===
| Year | Single | Peak chart positions | | Album |
| Year | Single | US Country | CAN Country | Album |
|---|---|---|---|---|
| 1987 | "Crazy Over You" | 4 | — | Foster & Lloyd |
| 1987 | "Sure Thing" | 8 | 8 | Foster & Lloyd |
| 1987 | "Hard to Say No" | — | — | Foster & Lloyd |
| 1988 | "Texas in 1880" | 18 | — | Foster & Lloyd |
| 1988 | "What Do You Want from Me This Time" | 6 | 17 | Foster & Lloyd |
| 1988 | "Fair Shake" | 5 | 5 | Faster & Llouder |
| 1989 | "Before the Heartache Rolls In" | 43 | 46 | Faster & Llouder |
| 1989 | "Suzette" | 48 | 52 | Faster & Llouder |
| 1990 | "Is It Love" | 43 | 26 | Version of the Truth |
| 1990 | "Can't Have Nothin'" | 38 | 59 | Version of the Truth (re-issue) |
"—" denotes releases that did not chart

=== Guest singles ===
| Year | Single | Artist | Peak positions | Album |
| Year | Single | Artist | US Country | Album |
|---|---|---|---|---|
| 1990 | "Tomorrow's World" | Various artists | 74 | Single only |

=== Music videos ===
| Year | Video | Director |
|---|---|---|
| 1987 | "Crazy Over You" | Richard Kooris |
| 1987 | "Hard to Say No" | Richard Kooris |
| 1988 | "Texas in 1880" | Steve Boyle |
| 1988 | "What Do You Want from Me This Time" | Steve Boyle |
| 1989 | "Before the Heartache Rolls In" | Steve Boyle |
| 1989 | "Fat Lady Sings" | Steve Boyle |
| 1989 | "Suzette" | Dean Lent |
| 1990 | "Is It Love" | Michael Salomon/Bud Schaetzle |
| 1990 | "Tomorrow's World" (Various) | Gustavo Garzon |
| 1990 | "Can't Have Nothin'" | Marius Penczner |
| 2011 | "It's Already Tomorrow" | Steve Boyle |
