= Bill Lloyd (country musician) =

American country music singer-songwriter (born 1955)

- Born: John William Lloyd; December 6, 1955 (age 70); Fort Hood, Texas, U.S.
- Origin: Nashville, Tennessee, U.S.
- Genres: Country; power pop
- Occupation: Singer-songwriter
- Instruments: Vocals, guitar
- Years active: 1987–present
- Formerly of: Foster & Lloyd; The Sky Kings

John William Lloyd (born December 6, 1955), known professionally as Bill Lloyd, is an American country music singer-songwriter. From 1987 to 1991, he was one-half of the duo Foster & Lloyd, and a member of The Sky Kings from then until 1997. In addition to his country career, Lloyd released three solo albums in a power pop style.

== Foster & Lloyd ==
John William Lloyd was born in Fort Hood, Texas. Due to his father being a member of the military, he moved across the United States frequently as a child. By the early 1980s, Lloyd was living in Tennessee and briefly attended Western Kentucky University before dropping out to pursue a career in music. In 1987, Lloyd joined Radney Foster to form the country duo Foster & Lloyd. They recorded for RCA Records Nashville from then until 1987, charting nine singles on the Billboard Hot Country Songs charts. This total included "Crazy Over You", "Sure Thing", "What Do You Want from Me This Time", and "Fair Shake", which the two wrote together. Also during this time span, Lloyd released an album of demos titled Feeling the Elephant.

After Foster & Lloyd split up in 1990, both members began recording as solo artists. Lloyd also found work playing guitar for Marshall Crenshaw, Ricky Van Shelton, and Steve Earle, in addition to releasing the solo albums Set to Pop and Standing on the Shoulders of Giants. Between 1991 and 1997, Lloyd was a member of The Sky Kings, which also included Rusty Young, John Cowan, and Patrick Simmons.

Lloyd continued to write songs during and after his tenure in The Sky Kings, including "Boom! It Was Over" by Robert Ellis Orrall and "Trying to Love You", which was recorded by both Beth Nielsen Chapman and Trisha Yearwood.

== Solo career ==
In 1987, Lloyd released his debut solo album, Feeling the Elephant. The album had a power pop sound different from the country style of Foster & Lloyd. Following the disbanding of the group, Lloyd also released his second and third power-pop albums, Set to Pop (1994) and Standing on the Shoulders of Giants (1999)
