= Courtney Johnson (musician) =

American musician

Background information
- Born: December 20, 1939; Glasgow, Barren County, Kentucky US
- Died: June 6, 1996 (aged 56) Glasgow, Barren County, Kentucky, US
- Genres: Newgrass, Bluegrass music
- Occupation: Musician
- Instruments: Banjo, guitar
- Years active: 1964–96
- Labels: Starday, Flying Fish
- Formerly of: New Grass Revival, Bluegrass Alliance

Courtney Johnson (December 20, 1939 – June 6, 1996) was an American banjo player, best known for his work as an original member of the band New Grass Revival. Influenced by Ralph Stanley and his Clinch Mountain Boys, Johnson is often considered to be an inventor of the newgrass style of banjo playing, polished and improved later on by such personalities as Béla Fleck, Alison Brown, Scott Vestal of Sam Bush Band and Jens Krüger of Kruger Brothers.

== Early life ==
Johnson began to play guitar at the age of seven, but didn't pick up the banjo until he was about 25 years old. He worked as a mechanic in a service station at his hometown of Hiseville, Kentucky before he earned enough money as a musician. Johnson played in several local bands, including the Rocky Road Boys with Bill Hatfield on fiddle and Bill Logsdon on guitar.

== Bluegrass Alliance ==
In 1969, Sam Bush asked Courtney to join his band, Poor Richard's Almanac. They played together in local clubs until 1970, when Bush left to join the Bluegrass Alliance band. In 1971, Johnson also joined the band, consisting of Bush, fiddler Lonnie Peerce, guitarist Tony Rice and bassist Ebo Walker. The Bluegrass Alliance is often considered as one of the bands that started to play progressive bluegrass. Band frontman Lonnie Peerce suffered with health problems and the band went on hiatus several times. Other members of the group were busy with other projects and all that led, consequently, to disbanding of the group and creation of the New Grass Revival. The Bluegrass Alliance eventually reformed in 1998 with all new members.

== New Grass Revival ==
New Grass Revival was formed by Bush, Johnson, Walker and Curtis Burch in 1971, after they left Lonnie Peerce and decided to create their own band. The group name comes from the style they created, "Newgrass", a term that Sam Bush credited to Ebo Walker. This line-up recorded the band's self-titled album in 1972. After some early changes on the bass position, the group recruited rock bassist John Cowan and recorded 5 albums in this setup. Most of the band members were multi-instrumentalists and Johnson often switched from banjo and guitar, sometimes even during one song on stage. He occasionally played dobro as well and occasionally sang harmony. During his years with New Grass Revival, he developed the banjo playing to new levels. He is considered as a very innovative banjo player, although not as polished as later group member Béla Fleck. His trademark banjo solos with the band include songs such as "When the Storm Is Over", "Steam Powered Aeroplane", "Fly through the Country", "This Heart of Mine", "Crooked Smile", "Souvenir Bottles", "Great Balls of Fire" and others.

== Later career ==
In 1981, Johnson and Burch left the New Grass Revival, citing that they were tired of touring. They continued playing locally in several bands including the Courtney Johnson Band, Barren County and BJT (Burch, Johnson, Timberlake). Johnson later put together a band including Burch on dobro/guitar, himself on banjo/guitar, his wife Hazel on mandolin/guitar and Eric Albany on bass. Johnson died on June 7, 1996, aged 56, diagnosed with lung cancer. On September 24 of that year, a benefit concert at the Ryman Auditorium in Nashville, Tennessee was organized by his friend Sam Bush. New Grass Revival, which disbanded in 1989, reunited for this occasion (with Béla Fleck on banjo). The concert also included John Hartford, Hot Rize, Tim O'Brien, Vassar Clements, Del McCoury Band, Ricky Skaggs, Pete Rowan, Jerry Douglas and others.

== Playing style ==
Although Johnson was influenced by traditional banjo players like Earl Scruggs and Ralph Stanley, he was always interested in playing more progressive styles. He was very fond of improvisation, which fit very well when he played in the New Grass Revival. He was described as a melodic banjo player, experimenting with merging styles like blues, rock and bluegrass.
