= John Cowan =

American progressive bluegrass vocalist and bass guitar player (born 1953)

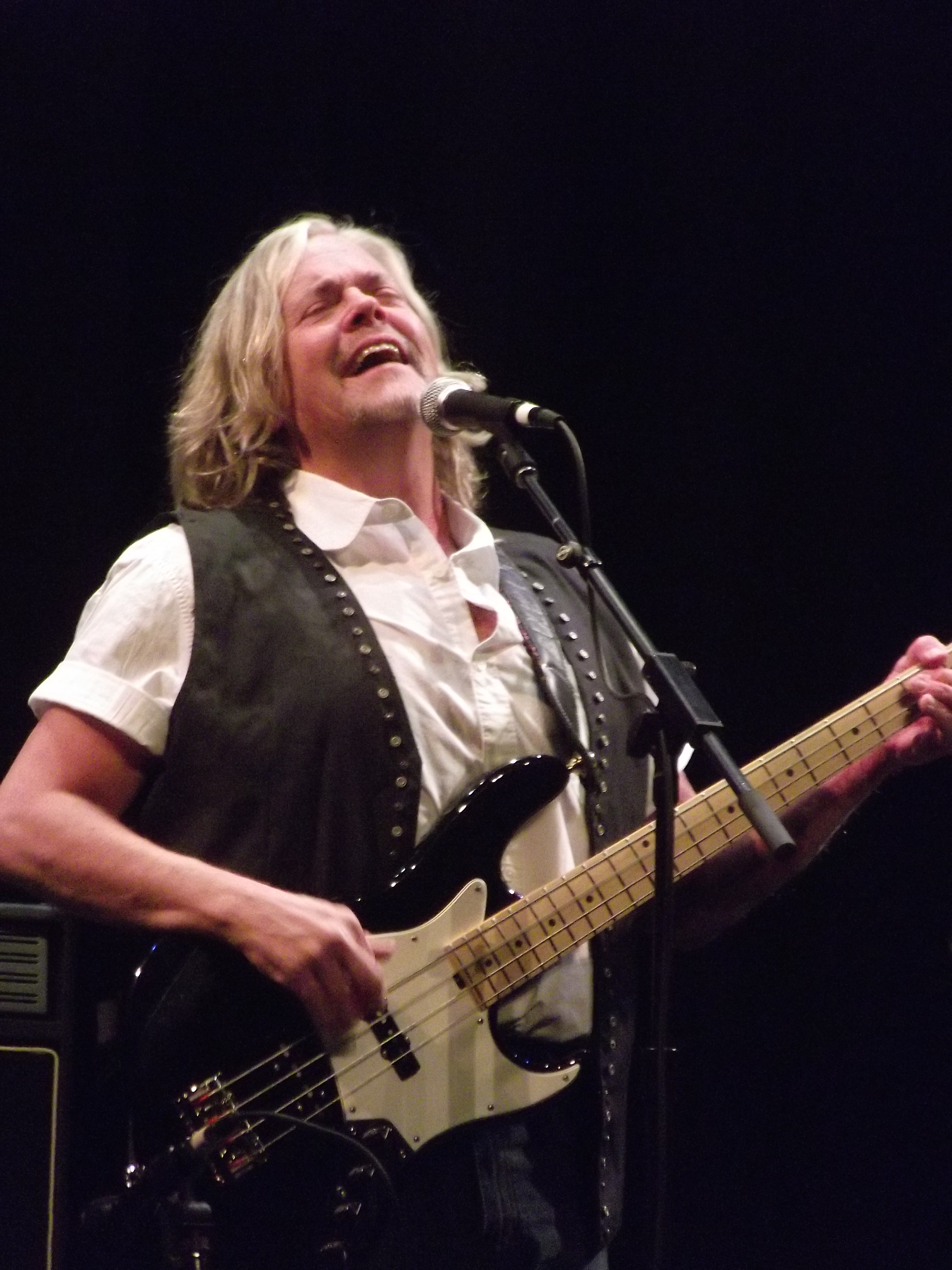
- Cowan in 2012

Background information
- Born: August 24, 1953 (age 73); Minerva, Ohio, U.S.
- Genres: Bluegrass, rock
- Occupation: Musician
- Instrument: Bass guitar
- Years active: 1974–present
- Labels: Sugar Hill, RCA
- Website: johncowan.com

John Cowan (born August 24, 1953) is an American vocalist and bass guitar player known for working in progressive bluegrass. He was the lead vocalist and bass player for the New Grass Revival. Cowan became the band's bassist in 1972 after the departure of original bassist Ebo Walker and was noted as being the only member of New Grass Revival not to come from a bluegrass background. He was inducted into the International Bluegrass Music Hall of Fame in 2020 as a member of New Grass Revival. He is also known for a longtime association with The Doobie Brothers.

== Biography ==
After the disbandment of the New Grass Revival, Cowan released a soul record of covers, called Soul'd Out, for the Sugar Hill Records label in 1990.

Cowan appeared as a duo with Sam Bush on the PBS series, Lonesome Pine Special in 1992, and also appeared with other artists on the program.

From 1988 to 1996, Cowan teamed with Rusty Young of Poco, Bill Lloyd of Foster & Lloyd and Pat Simmons of the Doobie Brothers—in a band originally called Four Wheel Drive, which was later changed to The Sky Kings. Several singles were released but failed to chart well. Two albums were recorded but not released by RCA until 1997 after the group's demise as the Sky Kings, "Out of the Blue".

Partly thanks to his collaboration with Simmons in Four Wheel Drive, Cowan also found himself the bass player for the Doobie Brothers from 1993 to 1995. His song "Can't Stand To Lose", co-written with Rusty Young, was featured on the Doobies' 2000 album Sibling Rivalry.

In addition, throughout the 1990s, Cowan picked up session work singing harmony vocals and/or playing bass on recordings of Travis Tritt, Steve Earle, Garth Brooks and Wynonna.

From 1996 to 1998, Cowan was the bassist and backing vocalist in Sam Bush's touring band.

The new century brought a blues record from Cowan. By 2002, his projects on Sugar Hill turned more to his "newgrass" stylings.

Cowan performed on two bluegrass tribute albums for the British rock band the Moody Blues: Moody Bluegrass: A Nashville Tribute to The Moody Blues (2004), and Moody Bluegrass TWO... Much Love (2011).

In 2006, Cowan left Sugar Hill and went to the independent label Pinecastle Records. In 2008, Cowan was chosen to participate in a movie on the life of Billy Graham, entitled 'Billy: The Early Years.'

In May 2010, Cowan rejoined The Doobie Brothers as their touring bass player (after their regular bassist, Skylark, suffered a stroke).

In 2017, he released an album with fellow Doobie Brother Ed Toth and Chicago guitarist Keith Howland titled Button.

== Discography ==
=== Studio albums ===
- 1986: Soul'd Out! (Sugar Hill) [as Johnny "C]"
- 2000: John Cowan (Sugar Hill)
- 2002: Always Take Me Back (Sugar Hill)
- 2006: New Tattoo (?)
- 2009: Comfort and Joy (eOne)
- 2010: The Massenburg Sessions (eOne)
- 2014: Sixty (Compass)
- 2024: Fiction (True Lonesome Records)

=== Live albums ===
- 2009: 8,745 Feet: Live at Telluride (eOne)

=== As a member of New Grass Revival ===
- 1975: Fly Through the Country (Flying Fish)
- 1977: When the Storm Is Over (Flying Fish)
- 1977: Too Late to Turn Back Now (Flying Fish)
- 1979: Barren County (Flying Fish)
- 1981: Commonwealth (Flying Fish)
- 1981: The Live Album (Paradise) [with Leon Russell]
- 1984: Live (Flying Fish)
- 1984: On the Boulevard (Capitol)
- 1984: Deviation (Rounder) with [Béla Fleck]
- 1986: New Grass Revival (Capitol)
- 1987: Hold to a Dream (Capitol)
- 1989: Friday Night in America (Capitol)

=== As a member of The Sky Kings ===
- 2000: From Out of the Blue (Rhino Handmade)
- 2014: 1992 (Sony)

=== Also appears on ===
- 1978: Bryn Haworth—Grand Arrival (A&M)
- 1978: John Prine—Bruised Orange (Asylum) [vocals on track 10, "The Hobo Song]"
- 1987: Foster and Lloyd—Foster & Lloyd (album) (RCA) [vocals]
- 1988: Steve Earle—Copperhead Road (UNI) [vocals]
- 1989: Nitty Gritty Dirt Band—Will the Circle Be Unbroken: Volume Two (Universal) [vocals]
- 1992: Wynonna Judd—Wynonna (Curb / MCA) [backing vocals]
- 1996: Kathy Chiavola—The Harvest (Demon) [vocals]
- 1996: Béla Fleck and the Flecktones—Live Art (Warner Records) [vocals on track 14, "Oh, Darling!"]
- 1999: Jesse Winchester—Gentleman Of Leisure (Sugar Hill) [vocals]
- 1999: Leftover Salmon—The Nashville Sessions (Hollywood) [vocals]
- 2000: The Doobie Brothers—Sibling Rivalry (Pyramid / Rhino) [bass, vocals]
- 2001: Candlewyck—Candlewyck (Votive Records) [vocals]
- 2003: Wayne Benson—An Instrumental Anthology (Pinecastle)
- 2014: Rodney Crowell—Tarpaper Sky (New West) [vocals]
- 2014: Candlewyck—Play (Votive Records) [vocals]
- 2016: Frank Solivan—Family, Friends & Heroes (Compass)
- 2017: Button—Button [bass, vocals]
- 2018: Michael Kelsh—Harmony Sovereign (Sonoita Records) [additional vocals]
