= Sam Bush =

American mandolinist (born 1952)

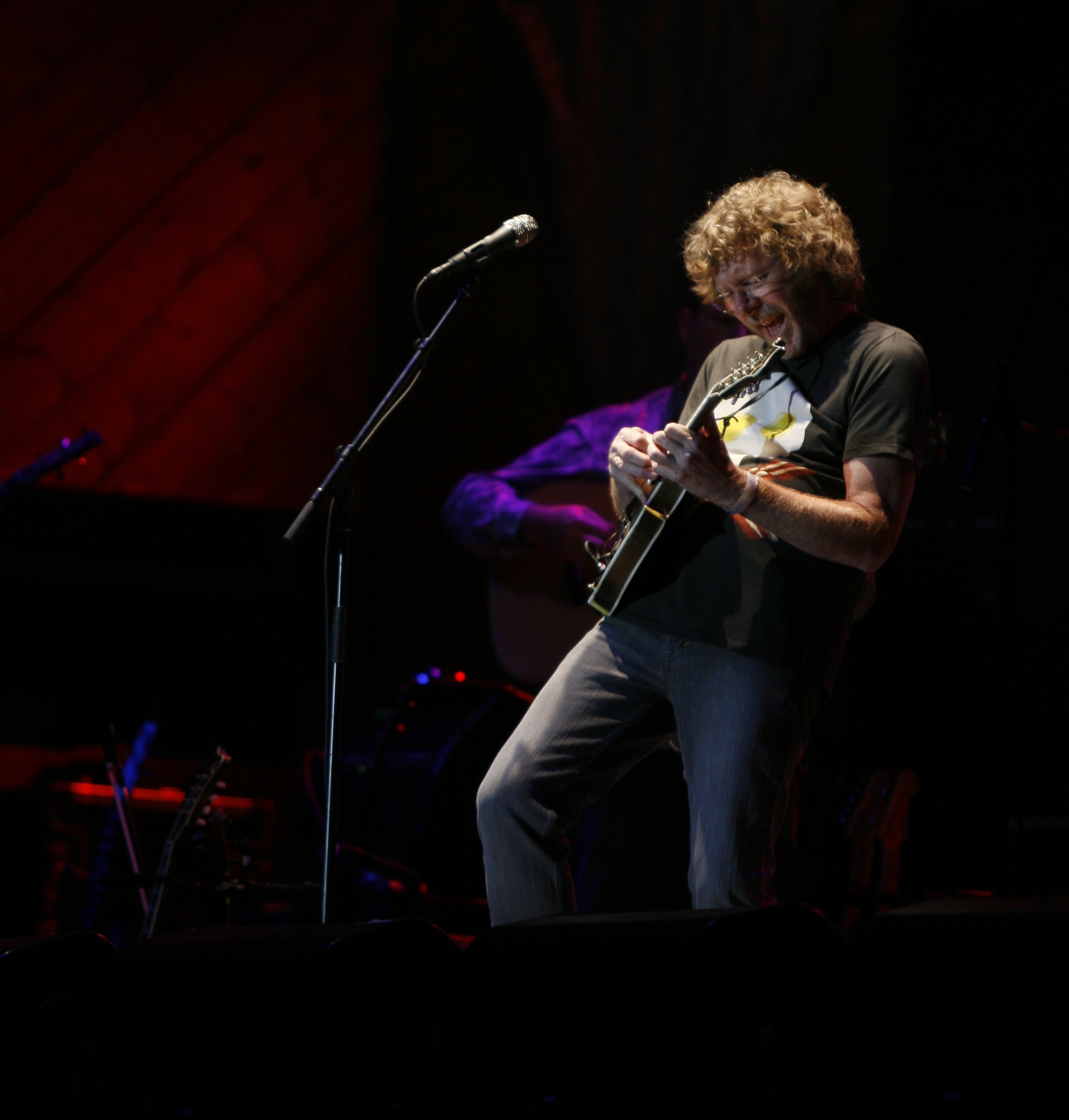
- Sam Bush performs in June 2012.

Background information
- Born: Charles Samuel Bush; April 13, 1952 (age 74); Bowling Green, Kentucky, U.S.
- Genres: Progressive bluegrass
- Occupations: Musician, singer
- Instruments: Mandolin, fiddle, banjo, guitar
- Years active: 1963–present
- Labels: Flying Fish, Sugar Hill, Ridge Runner
- Formerly of: Bluegrass Alliance; New Grass Revival; Strength in Numbers; Nash Ramblers
- Website: sambush.com

Charles Samuel Bush (born April 13, 1952) is an American mandolinist who is considered an originator of progressive bluegrass music. In 2020, he was inducted into the International Bluegrass Music Hall of Fame as a member of New Grass Revival. He was inducted into the Hall of Fame a second time in 2023 as a solo artist.

== History ==
Born in Bowling Green, Kentucky, Bush was exposed to country and bluegrass music at an early age through his father Charlie's record collection, and later by the Flatt & Scruggs television show. Buying his first mandolin at the age of 11, his musical interest was further piqued when he attended the inaugural Roanoke, VA Bluegrass Festival in 1965. As a teen, Bush took first place three times in the junior division of the National Oldtime Fiddler's Contest in Weiser, ID. He joined guitarist and vocalist Wayne Stewart, his mentor and music teacher during Sam's teen years, and banjoist Alan Munde (later of Country Gazette) and the three recorded an instrumental album, Poor Richard's Almanac, in 1969. In the spring of 1970, Bush attended the Fiddlers Convention at Union Grove, NC, and was inspired by the rock-flavored progressive bluegrass of the New Deal String Band. Later that year, he moved to Louisville and joined the Bluegrass Alliance. In the fall of 1971, the band dissolved and reformed as the New Grass Revival.

The New Grass Revival went through numerous personnel changes, with Bush remaining as the sole original member. Bassist and vocalist John Cowan joined in 1974, with banjo ace Béla Fleck and acoustic guitarist Pat Flynn being enlisted in 1981. From 1979 through 1981, the group toured with Leon Russell, opening the shows and backing Russell during his headlining set.

Beginning in 1980, Bush and Cowan periodically jammed with the Nashville-based Duckbutter Blues Band, whose other members were blues guitarist Kenny Lee, drummer Jeff Jones, and bassist Byron House. Bush recorded his debut solo album, Late as Usual, four years later. In 1989, Bush and Fleck joined Mark O'Connor, Jerry Douglas, and Edgar Meyer in an all-star bluegrass band, Strength in Numbers, at the Telluride Bluegrass Festival in Colorado. When the New Grass Revival dissolved in 1989, Bush joined Emmylou Harris' Nash Ramblers, touring and recording with Harris for the next five years.

In 1995, Bush worked as a sideman with Lyle Lovett and Bela Fleck's Flecktones. He formed his own band, featuring Cowan and ex-Nash Ramblers Jon Randall and Larry Atamanuick, shortly before recording his second solo album, Glamour & Grits, in 1996. He released his next album, Howlin' at the Moon, in 1998, with many of the same players and special guests, including Harris, Fleck and J. D. Crowe.

In the winter of 1997, Bush and the New Grass Revival reunited for an appearance on Late Night with Conan O'Brien as the backup band for Garth Brooks. On March 28, 1998, Bush's hometown of Bowling Green, KY, honored him with a special "Sam Bush Day" celebration.

Following Howlin' at the Moon in 1998, he released Ice Caps: Peaks of Telluride in 2000, which was a live recording. In 2004, Randall left Bush's band and Brad Davis took over harmony vocals and guitar duties.

In 2006, Bush released Laps in Seven. The release was significant because it marked the return of the banjo to Bush's recordings, played by Scott Vestal. The guitarist, Keith Sewell, performed on the recording, but shortly after took a job with the Dixie Chicks. Bush sought a new guitarist for his recordings and road band and found Stephen Mougin.

In 2007, Bush released his first live concert DVD, titled On The Road. 2007 also marked the first time he had been chosen to host the International Bluegrass Music Association Awards.

Bush contributed to two bluegrass tribute albums to the British Progressive Rock band the Moody Blues – 2004's Moody Bluegrass: A Nashville Tribute to the Moody Blues, and 2011's Moody Bluegrass TWO...Much Love. Bush provided the lead vocal for the Ray Thomas song "Nice To Be Here" on the latter album.

He lives in Nashville, Tennessee.

== Awards and honors ==
- Sam Bush was inducted into the Kentucky Music Hall of Fame in 2006.
- Sam Bush hosted the 22nd annual International Bluegrass Music Association Awards September 29, 2011, held at Nashville's historic Ryman Auditorium. He also hosted the 2007 IBMA Awards, held at the Grand Ole Opry House.
- The Americana Music Association (AMA) presented Sam Bush with the Lifetime Achievement for Instrumentalist award at the 8th Annual Americana Honors & Awards ceremony, presented by the Gibson Foundation at Ryman Auditorium September 17, 2009.
- The International Bluegrass Music Association (IBMA) has named Sam Bush Mandolin Player of the Year four times, in 1990, 1991, 1992, and 2007.
- In March 2010, Legislation passed in Kentucky that officially named Bowling Green the "Birthplace of Newgrass" and Sam Bush the "Father of Newgrass." The Resolution, sponsored by Representative Jim DeCesare, passed the Kentucky Senate 37-0 on March 25. It passed the House on March 3, 99–0.
- Sam Bush was the subject of the 2015 documentary Revival: The Sam Bush Story, which features commentary from Alison Krauss, Emmylou Harris, Bela Fleck, David Grisman, Ricky Skaggs, and The Avett Brothers, among others. Directed by Wayne Franklin and Kris Wheeler, the film was shown at various independent film festivals throughout 2015.
- Bush was inducted into the International Bluegrass Music Hall of Fame in 2020 as a member of New Grass Revival. He was inducted into the Hall of Fame for the second time in 2023 for his solo career, making him the sixth performer to have been inducted twice.

=== Grammy Awards ===
The Grammy Awards are awarded annually by the National Academy of Recording Arts and Sciences. Bush has won 3 awards from 14 nominations.

Year	Nominee / work	Award	Result
1987	"Seven By Seven"	Best Country Instrumental Performance	Nominated
1990	"Big Foot"	Best Country Instrumental Performance	Nominated
1993	"Scotland"	Best Country Instrumental Performance	Nominated
1993	At the Ryman with Emmylou Harris	Best Country Performance by a Duo or Group with Vocal	Won
1997	"The Sinister Minister"	Best Pop Instrumental Performance	Won
1999	"Reuben's Train"	Best Country Instrumental Performance	Nominated
1999	Home Sweet Home with Doc and Merle Watson	Best Bluegrass Album	Nominated
2000	Bluegrass Mandolin Extravaganza with David Grisman, Ricky Skaggs, Jesse McReynolds, and Frank Wakefield	Best Bluegrass Album	Nominated
2000	Meyer: Short Trip Home (In the Nickn of Time; BP; Concert Duo, The Prequel, Etc.) with Joshua Bell, Mike Marshall and Edgar Meyer	Best Classical Crossover Album	Nominated
2002	O Brother, Where Art Thou? with various artists	Album of the Year	Won
2005	"Puppies N'Knapsacks"	Best Country Instrumental Performance	Nominated
2006	"Who's Your Uncle?"	Best Country Instrumental Performance	Nominated
2011	Circles Around Me	Best Bluegrass Album	Nominated
2024	Radio John: The Songs of John Hartford	Best Bluegrass Album	Nominated

== Performance ==
As well as being an accomplished bluegrass vocalist, Bush also is an accomplished instrumentalist on the mandolin and fiddle, winning the title of National Fiddle champion at fifteen years of age. He was a founding member of the New Grass Revival and has been called a modern-day Bill Monroe, or as Sam would tell . .

. . if Bill was the father of bluegrass then I could be the mother because Monroe would say: 'here comes that mother now!'

Bush also recalls meeting Mr. Monroe as a young teen. After demonstrating his mandolin technique Monroe offered the advice: "stick to the fiddle".

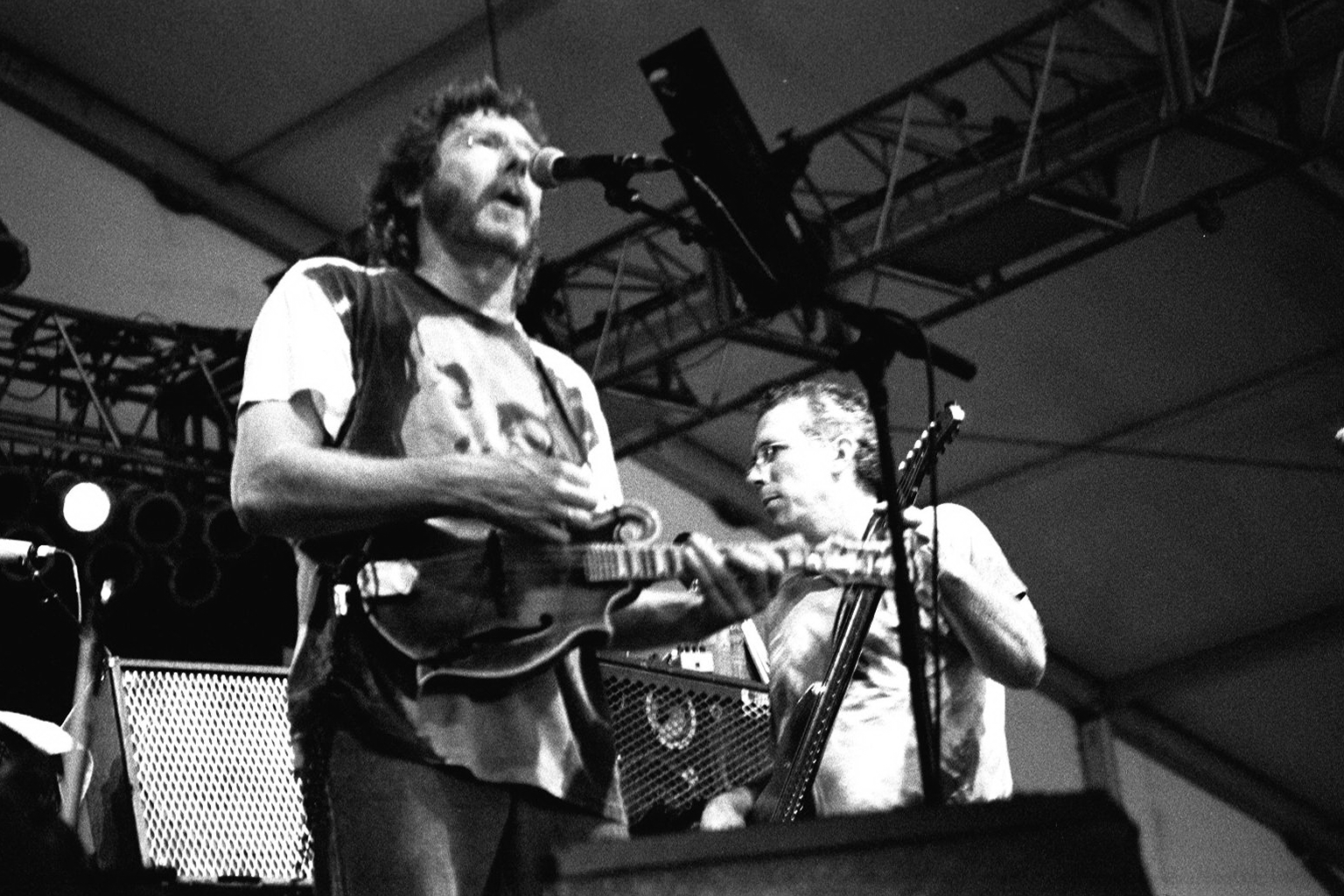
With Byron House, March 27, 2007.

Bush is one of the main attractions at the annual Telluride Bluegrass Festival in Telluride, Colorado and plays the eight p.m. set on Saturday night as well as many guest appearances throughout the weekend. He is affectionately known as "The King of Telluride" for his perennial appearances there (and Emmylou Harris the "Queen of Telluride"). Bush also toured in Harris' band, The Nash Ramblers. Additional collaborations include recording and live performances with Doc Watson, Linda Ronstadt, Dolly Parton, Ann Savoy, Tony Rice, Peter Rowan, Russ Barenberg, David Grisman, Mark O'Connor, Edgar Meyer, and in "Strength in Numbers", a band consisting of Béla Fleck, Mark O'Connor, Edgar Meyer, Jerry Douglas, and Sam Bush.

Strength in Numbers was a collaboration born from jam sessions at the Telluride Bluegrass Festival. The music on their CD release entitled "The Telluride Sessions" was all instrumental and recorded live, showcasing the individual talent of each player and their ability to improvise. During 2000–2008 there were many variations of the Strength in Numbers band, also known as "Bluegrass Sessions", always including Jerry Douglas, (Dobro), and usually bassist Byron House, also from Bowling Green, KY. Other musicians include Gabe Witcher (fiddle), Bryan Sutton (guitar), Tim O'Brien (fiddle, mandolin, guitar, vocals) and Darol Anger (fiddle).

The Sam Bush Band tours extensively, appearing at many small venues and large festivals such as the Strawberry Music Festival (Memorial Day and Labor Day), Rockygrass (late July), and every spring at the Americana Festival, MerleFest in Wilkesboro, North Carolina.

== Discography ==
=== Solo albums ===
Year	Album	Chart Positions			Label
Year	Album	US Bluegrass	US Country	US Heat	Label
1977	Together Again For The First Time (w/ Alan Munde)	—	—	—	Ridge Runner
1985	Late as Usual	—	—	—	Rounder
1996	Glamour & Grits	—	—	—	Sugar Hill
1998	Howlin' at the Moon	—	—	—	Sugar Hill
2000	Ice Caps: Peaks of Telluride	—	—	—	Sugar Hill
2003	Hold On, We're Strummin' (w/ David Grisman)	7	—	—	Acoustic Disc
2004	King of My World	2	64	—	Sugar Hill
2006	Laps in Seven	2	—	—	Sugar Hill
2009	Circles Around Me	3	—	47	Sugar Hill
2016	Storyman	3	—	—	Sugar Hill
2022	Radio John	2	—	—	Smithsonian Folkways

=== DVDs ===
- On the Road (2007) Sugar Hill

=== Specialty projects ===
- Norman Blake/Tut Taylor/Sam Bush/Butch Robins/Vassar Clements/David Holland/Jethro Burns - HDS 1975
- Down South - Doc & Merle Watson - Sugar Hill 1984
- Riding The Midnight Train - Doc Watson - Sugar Hill 1986
- Drive – Béla Fleck – Rounder Records 1988
- The Telluride Sessions by supergroup Strength in Numbers – MCA 1989
- Short Trip Home – Sony Classical 1999

(Edgar Meyer & Joshua Bell with Sam Bush and Mike Marshall)

- Bluegrass Mandolin Extravaganza – Acoustic Disc 1999

(w/ David Grisman, Ronnie McCoury, Jesse McReynolds, Ricky Skaggs, others)

- The Bluegrass Sessions – Béla Fleck – Warner Bros. 1999
- Soulgrass – Bluegrass and Jazz Fusion 2005
- Goin' Home: A Tribute to Fats Domino 2007, performing "Rising Sun" with Marc Broussard

=== New Grass Revival ===
- New Grass Revival (Hollywood, 1972)
- Fly Through the Country (Flying Fish, 1975)
- When the Storm Is Over (Flying Fish, 1977)
- Too Late to Turn Back Now (Flying Fish, 1977)
- Barren County (Flying Fish, 1979)
- Leon Russell & New Grass Revival (Paradise, 1981)
- Commonwealth (Flying Fish, 1981)
- On the Boulevard (Sugar Hill, 1984)
- Live in Toulouse (Sugar Hill, 1984)
- New Grass Revival (Capitol, 1986)
- Hold to a Dream (Capitol, 1988)
- Friday Night in America (Capitol, 1989)
- When the Storm Is Over/Fly Through the Country (Flying Fish, 1992)

Awards
Preceded by Larry Campbell	AMA Lifetime Achievement Award for Instrumentalist; 2009	Not Yet Awarded
