= Flying Fish Records =

American record label

- Founded: 1974
- Founder: Bruce Kaplan
- Defunct: 1992
- Status: Defunct
- Distributor: Rounder Records
- Genre: Folk; bluegrass; country; blues; dancefloor
- Country of origin: U.S.
- Location: Chicago, Illinois
- Official website: www.rounder.com

Flying Fish Records was a record label founded in Chicago in 1974 that specialized in folk, blues, and country music. In the 1990s the label was sold to Rounder Records.

Bruce Kaplan, the label's founder, was a native of Chicago and the son of a president of Zenith Electronics. He studied anthropology at the University of Chicago and became president of the school's folklore society. He began Flying Fish in 1974 to concentrate on traditional and contemporary folk music, though the catalog grew to include blues, bluegrass, country, jazz, reggae, dancefloor and rock.

When Kaplan started the label, most similarly oriented companies produced albums with decidedly "homemade" packaging (e.g. cover art, etc.) and marketed the albums to a relatively narrow audience of aficionados. Kaplan realized that music of this sort had the potential to reach a wider audience, but needed to be packaged in a professional manner; people not already devotees were unlikely to take a chance on something that did not look like it came from a "real" record company. Kaplan also invested in broader promotion of the music (wide provision of albums to radio; targeted advertising to back up tours). Essentially, he located a niche between the hit-based promotion model of the major labels and the faith of the small independents that the music would find its own audience. Flying Fish recording artists were able to find that audience at the local Evanston, Illinois, venue Amazingrace Coffeehouse, which presented numerous artists off the roster, including Vassar Clements, John Hartford, New Grass Revival, Norman Blake, and Claudia Schmidt.

Starting with the Hillbilly Jazz double album featuring fiddler Vassar Clements, and following up with a Grammy Award winning album by John Hartford, Flying Fish Records's success with this niche approach led to similar changes by many other roots labels of the period.

In December 1992, Kaplan developed an ear infection that did not respond to antibiotic treatment and he died unexpectedly. After a brief period under the direction of longtime employee Jim Netter, supported by Kaplan's widow Sandra Shifrin (a social worker), the label was sold to Rounder Records, where Kaplan had worked as a producer for a brief period before founding Flying Fish. The label bought Hogeye Music in the mid-1980s. Flying Fish distributed Blind Pig Records and Rooster Blues.

== Roster ==
- Adam Rudolph
- Andrew Odom
- Anne Hills
- Arlen Roth
- Austin Lounge Lizards
- Aztec Two-Step
- Barry Mitterhoff
- Benny Martin
- Big Twist and the Mellow Fellows
- Blue Riddim Band
- Bob Franke
- Bonnie Koloc
- Bobby Sanabria
- Boogie Bill Webb
- Brave Old World
- Bryan Bowers
- Buddy Emmons
- Chubby Carrier
- Cache Valley Drifters
- Cephas & Wiggins
- Chris Daniels
- Chris Smither
- Chubby Carrier
- Chuck Suchy
- Claudia Schmidt
- Country Gazette
- Critton Hollow String Band
- David Amram
- David Mallett
- David Massengill
- Doc & Merle Watson
- Don Lange
- Doug Dillard
- Doug Jernigan
- Eddy Clearwater
- Erwin Helfer
- Eternal Wind
- Filé (band)
- Flor de Caña
- Foday Musa Suso
- Frankie Armstrong
- Frankie Lee
- Fred Holstein
- Fred Small
- Freeman & Lange
- Gamble Rogers
- Gary Primich
- Geoff Muldaur
- Gillman Deaville
- Guy Carawan
- Gove Scrivenor
- Hassan Hakmoun
- Hickory Wind
- Hot Rize
- Hotmud Family
- Jan A. P. Kaczmarek
- Jane Sapp
- Jason Eklund
- Jean Ritchie
- Jim Post
- Joel Rubin
- John Hartford
- John Kruth
- John Renbourn
- Keith Mansfield
- Kenny Sultan & Tom Ball
- Killbilly
- The Klezmatics
- The Klezmorim
- Larry Long
- Larry McNeely
- Laurie Lewis
- Lester Flatt
- Linda Waterfall
- Little Mike and the Tornadoes
- Lorraine Duisit
- Mary McCaslin
- Merle Watson
- Michael Peter Smith
- Morrigan
- New Grass Revival
- New Lost City Ramblers
- Norman Blake
- Northern Lights
- Pat Burton
- Patent Pending
- Paul Geremia
- Pete Seeger
- Peter Rowan
- Preston Reed
- Priscilla Herdman
- Randy Sabien
- Rare Air
- Red Clay Ramblers
- Robin Petrie
- Roy Book Binder
- Sam Bush
- Satan and Adam
- Shel Silverstein
- Shinobu Sato
- Si Kahn
- Simon & Bard
- The Smith Sisters
- Sparky and Rhonda Rucker
- Stéphane Grappelli
- Steve Lyon
- Sweet Honey in the Rock
- T. Michael Coleman
- Terry Garthwaite
- Those Darn Accordions
- Tom Ball & Kenny Sultan
- Tom Chapin
- Tom Dreesen
- Tom Juravich
- Tom Paxton
- Tony Trischka
- Toshi Reagon
- Tracy Nelson
- Trapezoid (band)
- Trian
- Tut Taylor
- Valerie Wellington
- Vassar Clements
- Yasmeen Williams

== See also ==
- List of record labels
