= Pat Flynn (bluegrass musician) =

American singer-songwriter

Patrick Flynn born May 17, 1952, in Redondo Beach, California, is an American guitarist, singer, and songwriter, best known for his association with New Grass Revival from 1981–89. In 2020, he was inducted into the International Bluegrass Music Hall of Fame as a member of New Grass Revival.

== Career ==
Flynn is featured on the Randy Travis album Rise and Shine released in 2001, and on Lee Ann Womack's I Hope You Dance (2000). In addition, he wrote and performed on Garth Brooks' hit single Do What You Gotta Do, which was originally performed by New Grass Revival.

Flynn is a featured artist on the Nashville Acoustic Sessions CD project, with Raul Malo, Rob Ickes, and Dave Pomeroy on CMH Records. The record ended up on some critics' "best of the year" lists and achieved Top-10 status on the Americana radio chart. He is also a featured player on The Greencards CDs, Movin' On and Weather and Water, released on DualTone Records.

In 2004, Flynn released his first solo CD project, entitled reQuest. Appearing with Flynn on this project are Béla Fleck, John Cowan, Rob Ickes, Stuart Duncan, Jim Hoke, Buddy Greene, and others.

In 2007, he released his second CD, reVision. Flynn has been featured by cover stories in Flatpicking Guitar and Bluegrass Now magazines, and he was chosen as Tom T. Hall's musical director and guitarist for Hall's "Artist In Residence" month at The Country Music Hall of Fame in Nashville.

In November and December 2009, Flynn toured as lead guitarist in Michael Martin Murphey's Rio Grande Band for Murphey's annual production of Cowboy Christmas.
