= New Grass Revival =

American progressive bluegrass band

- Classic (1974–1981) line-up of the band: Sam Bush, Curtis Burch, John Cowan, and Courtney Johnson

Background information
- Origin: Louisville, Kentucky, United States
- Genres: Progressive bluegrass; country
- Years active: 1971–1989 (one-off reunions: 1993, 1996, 1997, 2007)
- Labels: Starday, Flying Fish, Rounder, Sugar Hill, Capitol, Liberty
- Past members: Sam Bush; Courtney Johnson; Ebo Walker; Curtis Burch; Butch Robins; John Cowan; Béla Fleck; Pat Flynn

New Grass Revival was an American progressive bluegrass band founded in 1971 and composed of Sam Bush, Courtney Johnson, Ebo Walker, Curtis Burch, Butch Robins, John Cowan, Béla Fleck, and Pat Flynn. They were active between 1971 and 1989 releasing more than twenty albums as well as six singles. Their highest-charting single is "Callin' Baton Rouge", which peaked at No. 37 on the U.S. country charts in 1989 and was a Top 5 country hit for Garth Brooks five years later.

In 2020, the group were inducted into the Bluegrass Music Hall of Fame.

== Origin ==
The origins of New Grass Revival lay in the Bluegrass Alliance, which Bush (vocals, fiddle, guitar, mandolin) and Courtney Johnson (banjo, vocals) joined in 1970. At the time, the Alliance also featured bassist Walker and fiddler Lonnie Peerce. After that Curtis Burch (dobro, guitar, vocals) joined the band but in 1972, Peerce left the band. The remaining members decided to continue under the new name New Grass Revival. The band released their debut album, The Arrival of the New Grass Revival, later in 1972 on Starday Records.

== History ==
=== Separation from mainstream bluegrass ===
The New Grass Revival bucked tradition, with long hair, informal clothing, and performances of songs from a variety of genres including music by Jerry Lee Lewis ("Great Balls of Fire"), the Beatles ("Get Back"; "I'm Down"), and Bob Marley ("One Love/People Get Ready") plus protest songs ("One Tin Soldier"). The break from bluegrass tradition was not well received in some quarters—some thought it was not the way Bill Monroe meant for bluegrass to be played. "Our reason for doing the newer-type music wasn't pretentious or irreverent or sarcastic or disrespectful," said Curtis Burch. "We just felt like people were ready to see that you could really expand the sound, using those same instruments." In 1979, they became the backup group and opening act for Leon Russell.

=== First line-up (1972–1981) ===
After the release of their debut, Walker left and was replaced by Butch Robins who was with the band from July 1973 to November 1974. He was replaced by John Cowan, an Evansville, Indiana native. The line-up was stable throughout the 1970s recording albums on Flying Fish Records. New Grass Revival never played traditional bluegrass—all of the members brought elements of rock and roll, jazz, and blues to the group's sound. As a result, certain portions of the bluegrass community scorned them but they also gained a devoted following of listeners.

=== Second line-up (1981–1989) ===
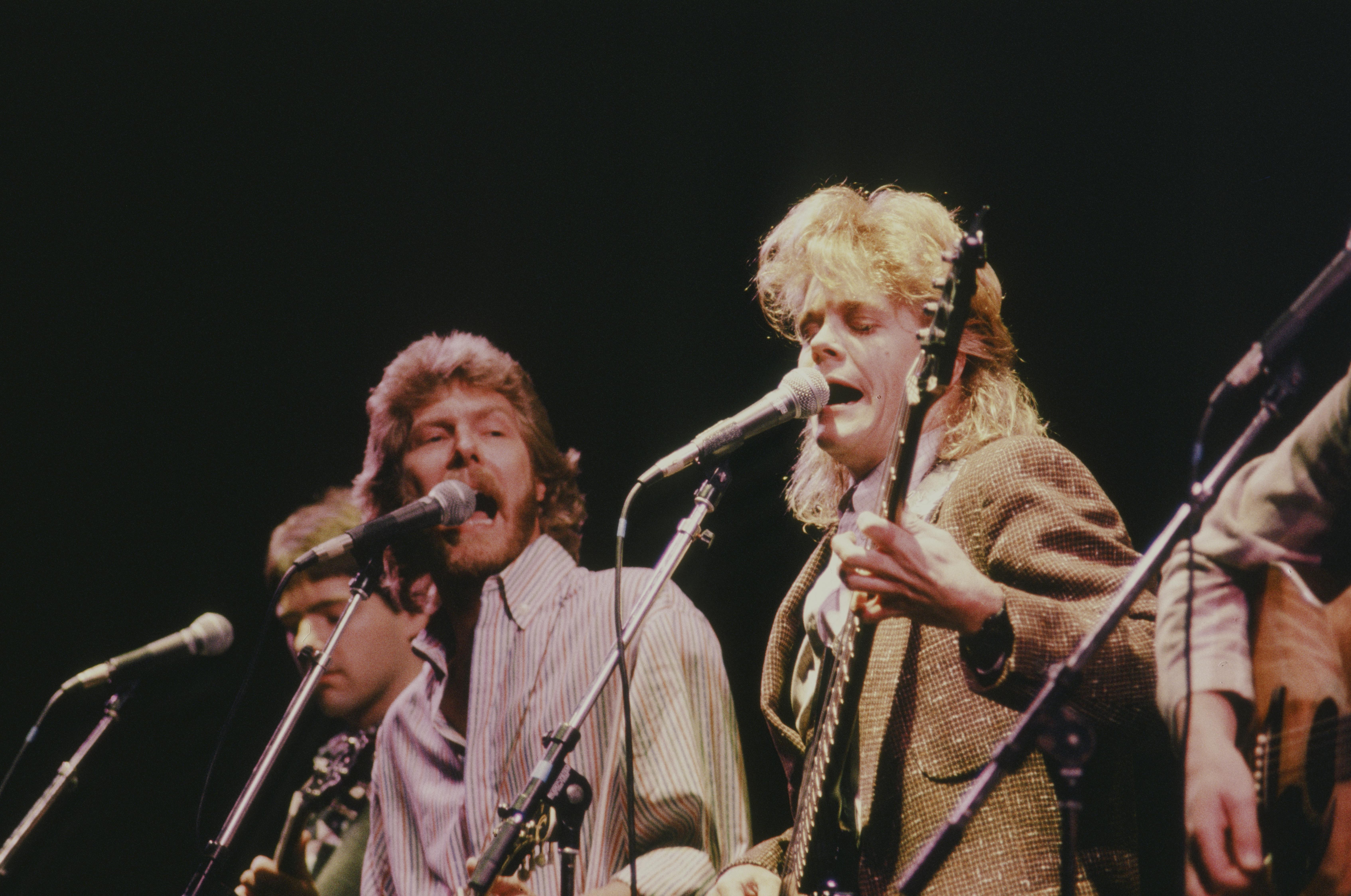
New Grass Revival performing in Norway. From left: Béla Fleck, Sam Bush, John Cowan.

In 1981, Johnson and Burch left the band being tired of touring. Bush and Cowan continued the group, replacing them with virtuoso banjoist Béla Fleck and guitarist Pat Flynn. Fleck's compositions like "Metric Lips", "Seven by Seven" and "Big Foot" were well received as were Flynn's "Do What You Gotta Do", "Lonely Rider", and "On The Boulevard". Flynn also brought strong lead and harmony vocals to the group as well as a distinctive guitar style.

In 1984, the group moved to Sugar Hill Records and released their first album featuring the new line-up, On the Boulevard. In 1986, the band signed with EMI Records and released an eponymous album, which proved to be their breakthrough into the mainstream. Two of the singles from the album, "What You Do to Me" and "Ain't That Peculiar", were minor hits on the country chart and Fleck's showcase "Seven by Seven" was nominated for a Grammy Award for Best Country Instrumental. Hold to a Dream, released in 1987 contained hit singles including "Unconditional Love" and "Can't Stop Now". In 1989, New Grass Revival released their third major-label album, Friday Night in America which was another commercial success. "Callin' Baton Rouge" became their first Top 40 single, followed by the number 58 hit "You Plant Your Fields". Even though the band was more popular than ever, Bush decided to pull the plug on the group after the release of Friday Night in America. He formed The Sam Bush Band, and Fleck went on to a successful and respected solo career.

New Grass Revival reunion at beneficial concert for Courtney Johnson in Nashville, September 1996; from left: Béla Fleck, Sam Bush, John Cowan, Curtis Burch

=== After break-up ===
In 1993, Bush, Cowan, Fleck, and Flynn returned to the studio to back Garth Brooks on his recording of "Callin' Baton Rouge".

Banjoist Courtney Johnson died of lung cancer in 1996 at age 56. Bush, Fleck, Cowan, and Burch reunited for one concert (September 24, 1996) at the Ryman Auditorium in Nashville to benefit his widow. The concert included a number of musicians and groups including John Hartford, Hot Rize, Tim O'Brien, Vassar Clements, Del McCoury Band, Ricky Skaggs, Pete Rowan, Jerry Douglas, and others. In 1997, when Brooks was invited on Late Night with Conan O'Brien to perform "Do What You Gotta Do", a song written by Flynn, he asked Flynn, Bush, Cowan, and Fleck to join him in performing it. Since that performance Flynn has worked with both Cowan and Fleck, but not Bush. Likewise, Bush has also worked with Cowan and Fleck on numerous occasions. Bush and Cowan have played with Burch.

In April 2007, Bush, Fleck, Cowan, and Flynn stepped into the spotlight together during the Merlefest 20th Anniversary Jam and played the Townes Van Zandt song "White Freight Liner". The single-song reunion was the first time the four of them had played together in a decade. Bush, Cowan and Burch performed with their own groups on the world's first International Newgrass Festival 21–23 August 2009 at Ballance Motox in Oakland northeast of Bowling Green, Kentucky.

== Personnel ==
Members

- Sam Bush – mandolin, fiddle, guitar, vocals (1972–1989)
- Curtis Burch – guitar, vocals (1972–1981)
- Courtney Johnson – banjo, guitar, vocals (1972–1981; died 1996)
- Ebo Walker – bass, vocals (1972–1973)
- Butch Robins – bass (1973–1974)
- John Cowan – bass, vocals (1974–1989)
- Béla Fleck – banjo, guitar, vocals (1981–1989)
- Pat Flynn – guitar, vocals (1981–1989)
Sam Bush
Curtis Burch
Courtney Johnson
Ebo Walker
Butch Robins
John Cowan
Béla Fleck
Pat Flynn
│
1972
│
1973
│
1974
│
1975
│
1976
│
1977
│
1978
│
1979
│
1980
│
1981
│
1982
│
1983
│
1984
│
1985
│
1986
│
1987
│
1988
│
1989
