= Are You Ready for the Big Show? =

Live album by Radney Foster
- Released: June 26, 2001
- Genre: Country
- Length: 59:50
- Label: Dualtone
- Producer: Radney Foster

Radney Foster chronology
See What You Want to See (1998)	Are You Ready for the Big Show? (2001)	Another Way to Go (2002)

Are You Ready for the Big Show? is the fourth album by American country music singer Radney Foster. It was released in 2001 for Dualtone Records. It is a live album, featuring re-recordings of Foster's past songs, including his first two singles, "Just Call Me Lonesome" and "Nobody Wins". Also included as a hidden track is "Texas in 1880", which Foster originally released in 1988 as one-half of Foster & Lloyd.

The version from this album, a duet with Pat Green, charted at number 54 on Hot Country Songs in 2001.

== Critical reception ==
Giving it 4 out of 5 stars, Matt Reasor of Allmusic said that Foster "returns full circle to his neo-traditionalist roots". Jim Caliguri of The Austin Chronicle gave the album three stars, saying that it was "an accurate snapshot of another night of South Austin musical magic."

== Track listing ==
All songs written by Radney Foster; co-writers in parentheses.

1. "Are You Ready for the Big Show?" — 0:15^{A}
2. "Tonight" (Mac McAnally) — 4:14
3. "God Knows When" — 4:01
4. "Just Call Me Lonesome" (George Ducas) — 3:27
5. "Something Stupid" — 0:12^{A}
6. "School of Hard Knocks" — 3:18
7. "Intro to Went for a Ride" — 1:45^{A}
8. "Went for a Ride" (Alice Randall) — 4:06
9. "I'm Used to It" — 4:13
10. "Folding Money" — 6:57
11. "Leaning on What Love Can Do" — 4:36
12. "How You Play the Hand" (Peter Smith) — 4:09
13. "Nobody Wins" (Foster, Kim Richey) — 4:19
14. "We Know Better" — 0:08^{A}
15. "I'm In" (Georgia Middleman) — 5:56
16. "Texas in 1880" — 4:08^{B}
  - duet with Pat Green
17. "Tonight (reprise)" (Foster, McAnally) — 4:06^{B}
- ^{A}Interstitial sketch.
- ^{B}Hidden track.

== Personnel ==
- Jeff Armstrong - Hammond organ, Wurlitzer
- Ashley Arrison - backing vocals
- Radney Foster - acoustic guitar, lead vocals, backing vocals
- Pat Green - vocals on "Texas in 1880"
- Byron House - upright bass
- Mike McAdam - electric guitar, slide guitar
- Charlie Miller - introduction
- Chris Thile - mandolin
- Matt Thompson - drums, trash cans, backing vocals
