= II (The Kinleys album) =

Studio album by The Kinleys
- Released: July 18, 2000
- Genre: Country
- Label: Epic Nashville
- Producer: Radney Foster; Russ Zavitson; Tony Haselden

The Kinleys chronology
Just Between You and Me (1997)	II (2000)	All in the Family (2004)

Singles from See What You Want to See
- 1. "She Ain't the Girl for You" Released: March 27, 2000; 2. "I'm In" Released: October 23, 2000; 3. "You're Still Here" Released: June 4, 2001

Professional ratings
Review scores
Source	Rating
Allmusic	4/5 stars
Entertainment Weekly	D+

II is the second studio album by the American country music duo The Kinleys. It was released on July 18, 2000 as their second and final album for Epic Nashville.

== Background ==
The Kinleys worked with the producers of their debut album, Russ Zavitson and Tony Haselden, for their follow-up album, and released the single "My Heart Is Still Beating" in July 1999. The single, however, failed to reach the Country top 40, and the album, which was to be self-titled and released on October 6, 1999, was put on hold by Epic Records, who decided to bring in Country artist Radney Foster to produce songs on the album in order to broaden the duo's sound and regain chart appeal. In the end, half of the album was produced by Foster and the other half by Zavitson and Haselden.

The record includes two songs co-written by Jennifer Kinley's husband, Adam Hughes, and also has the first lead vocal performance of Jennifer Kinley in a Kinleys song on "I Need You Now", the duo's usual way of singing consisting of Heather Kinley on lead with Jennifer on harmony vocals. The duo recorded a song titled "If I Can Only Win Your Love" with Vince Gill, but it was ultimately not used on the album as they felt it wasn't good enough.

"My Heart Is Still Beating" was eventually not included on the album and the first single, the Foster-produced "She Ain't The Girl For You" was released in the Spring of 2000. It peaked at #34 in the Country charts.

The next single, "I'm In" peaked at #35 in the Country charts. It was previously a single in 1998 for Foster from his album See What You Want to See, and was covered by Keith Urban on his 2009 album Defying Gravity. Also included on II is "Somebody's Out There Watching", a Top 20 hit for The Kinleys in 1998, which was previously included on the television soundtrack for the series Touched by an Angel.

== Track listing ==
No.	Title	Writer(s)	Length
1.	"She Ain't the Girl for You""	Jon McElroy, Vince Melamed	3:32
2.	"I'm In"	Radney Foster, Georgia Middleman	4:55
3.	"You're Still Here"	Adam Hughes, Sarah Majors, D. Vincent Williams	3:11
4.	"If Ever I Needed You"	Foster, Heather Kinley, Jennifer Kinley	3:43
5.	"That's Gonna Mess You Up"	Hughes, Majors, H. Kinley, J. Kinley	2:58
6.	"When the Blues and My Baby Collide"	Bob DiPiero, Paul Nelson	3:28
7.	"Me Too"	Stan Munsey, Russ Zavitson	3:36
8.	"Lovers"	Leslie Satcher, Wynn Varble	2:56
9.	"I'm Me with You"	Marcus Hummon, H. Kinley, J. Kinley	3:00
10.	"Yeah, Yeah, Yeah"	Hummon, H. Kinley, J. Kinley	2:18
11.	"Here"	H. Kinley, J. Kinley, Sunny Russ	2:56
12.	"I Need You Now"	Tom Douglas, Michael Joyce	3:35
13.	"Somebody's Out There Watching"	Steve Booker, Franne Golde, Robin Lerner	3:19

== Personnel ==
Compiled from liner notes.

=== Tracks 1–6 ===
- Sam Bush — fiddle
- Chad Cromwell — drums
- Steve Fishell — pedal steel guitar, Dobro, Weissenborn
- Pat Flynn — acoustic guitar
- Tony Harrell — keyboards
- Byron House — bass guitar
- Craig Krampf — percussion
- James Maddox — keyboards
- Dennis Matkotsky — keyboards
- Michael McAdam — electric guitar
- Joe Pisapia — electric guitar
- Chely Wright — background vocals on "She Ain't the Girl for You"

=== Tracks 7–13 ===
- Joe Chemay — bass guitar
- Shannon Forrest — drums, percussion
- Larry Franklin — fiddle
- Sonny Garrish — steel guitar, Dobro
- John Hobbs — synthesizer
- Jerry Kimbrough — acoustic guitar, bouzouki
- Marc Kunkel — harmonica
- Steve Nathan — piano, Hammond B-3 organ
- Michael Rhodes — bass guitar
- Brent Rowan — electric guitar
- Mitchell Shedd — percussion
- Biff Watson — acoustic guitar, bouzouki
- John Willis — electric guitar, banjo

=== Strings on "If Ever I Needed You" ===
- Anthony LaMarchina, John Catchings — cello
- David Davidson, Conni Ellisor, Mary Kathryn VanOsdale, David Angell — violins

Strings arranged by John Darnell.

Tracks 1–6 produced by Radney Foster; tracks 7–13 produced by Tony Haselden and Russ Zavitson.

== Charts ==
Chart (2000)	Peak position
U.S. Billboard Top Country Albums	18
U.S. Billboard 200	177
U.S. Billboard Top Heatseekers	10
