= 33rd Academy of Country Music Awards =

US music awards ceremony in 1998

- Date: April 22, 1998
- Location: Universal Amphitheatre, Los Angeles, California
- Hosted by: No host

Highlights
- Most wins: Tim McGraw; Faith Hill (4 each)
- Most nominations: Tim McGraw (6)

Television/radio coverage
- Network: CBS

The 33rd Academy of Country Music Awards was held on April 22, 1998, at the Universal Amphitheatre, in Los Angeles, California. The ceremony was not hosted by anyone.

== Winners and nominees ==
Winners are shown in bold.

Entertainer of the Year	Album of the Year
**Garth Brooks**; Brooks & Dunn; Alan Jackson; Reba McEntire; George Strait	**Carrying Your Love with Me — George Strait**; Come On Over — Shania Twain; Everywhere — Tim McGraw; Long Stretch of Lonesome — Patty Loveless; Sevens — Garth Brooks
Top Female Vocalist of the Year	Top Male Vocalist of the Year
**Trisha Yearwood**; Deana Carter; Patty Loveless; Martina McBride; LeAnn Rimes	**George Strait**; Alan Jackson; Tim McGraw; Collin Raye; Bryan White
Top Vocal Duo or Group of the Year	Top Vocal Event of the Year
**Brooks & Dunn**; Alabama; Diamond Rio; Lonestar; Sawyer Brown	**"It's Your Love"** — **Tim McGraw (feat. Faith Hill)**; "I'm So Happy I Can't Stop Crying" — Toby Keith (feat. Sting); "In Another's Eyes" — Trisha Yearwood (feat. Garth Brooks); "What If I Said" — Anita Cochran (feat. Steve Wariner); "You Don't Seem to Miss Me" — Patty Loveless (feat. George Jones)
Single Record of the Year	Song of the Year
**"It's Your Love"** — **Tim McGraw (feat. Faith Hill)**; "Carrying Your Love With Me" — George Strait; "How Do I Live" — LeAnn Rimes; "How Do I Live" — Trisha Yearwood; "How Your Love Makes Me Feel" — Diamond Rio	**"It's Your Love"** — **Stephony Smith**; "All the Good Ones Are Gone" — Dean Dillon, Bob McDill; "How Do I Live" — Diane Warren; "Something That We Do" — Clint Black, Skip Ewing; "The Fool" — Charley Stefl, Gene Ellsworth, Marla Cannon
Top New Male Vocalist	Top New Female Vocalist
**Kenny Chesney**; Rhett Akins; Michael Peterson	**Lee Ann Womack**; Sara Evans; Lila McCann
Top New Vocal Duo or Group	Video of the Year
**The Kinleys**; Big House; The Lynns	**"It's Your Love"** — **Tim McGraw (feat. Faith Hill)**; "455 Rocket" — Kathy Mattea; "A Broken Wing" — Martina McBride; "Did I Shave My Legs for This?" — Deana Carter; "How Your Love Makes Me Feel" — Diamond Rio
Special Achievement Award
**Garth Brooks**
Pioneer Award
**Charlie Daniels**

== Performers ==
Performer(s)	Song(s)
Clint Black	"Nothin' but the Taillights"
Tim McGraw	"One of These Days"
Sawyer Brown	"We're Everything to Me"
Sara Evans; Lila McCann; Lee Ann Womack	Top New Female Vocalist Medley "Three Chords and the Truth" "Almost Over You" "Buckaroo"
LeAnn Rimes	"Commitment"
Alabama	"Dancin', Shaggin' on the Boulevard"
Faith Hill	"This Kiss"
Steve Wariner; Garth Brooks	"Burnin' the Roadhouse Down"
George Strait	"I Just Want to Dance with You"
Brooks & Dunn; Reba McEntire	"If You See Him/If You See Her"
Patty Loveless	"To Have You Back Again"
Rhett Akins; Kenny Chesney; Michael Peterson	Top New Male Vocalist Medley "Drivin' My Life Away" "That's Why I'm Here" "From Here to Eternity"
Trisha Yearwood	"There Goes My Baby"
Collin Raye	"I Can Still Feel You"
Deana Carter	"Absence of the Heart"
Martina McBride	"A Broken Wing"
Bryan White; The Dixie Chicks; Dwight Yoakam	Tribute "Take Me Home, Country Roads" "Stand by Your Man" "Blue Suede Shoes"
Diamond Rio	"How Your Love Makes Me Feel"
The Kinleys; The Lynns; Big House	Top New Vocal Duo or Group Medley "Just Between You and Me" "Woman to Woman" "Cold Outside"

== Presenters ==
Presenter(s)	Notes
Trace Adkins; Olivia Newton-John	Top Vocal Group or Duo of the Year
Randy Travis; Suzy Bogguss	Top New Female Vocalist
Trisha Yearwood	Presented Special Achievement Award to Garth Brooks
Glen Campbell; Mindy McCready	Video of the Year
Michelle Wright; Rick Trevino; Lari White	Album of the Year
Neal McCoy; Donna Fargo	Top Female Vocalist of the Year
Garth Brooks	Presented Pioneer Award to Charlie Daniels
Charley Pride; Kathy Mattea	Top New Male Vocalist
Jeff Carson; Anita Cochran; Kevin Sharp	Song of the Year
Buck Owens; Chely Wright	Top Vocal Event of the Year
Shawnae Jebbia; Ty Herndon	Top Male Vocalist of the Year
Joe Diffie; Pam Tillis	Single Record of the Year
Jack Hanna; Tracy Lawrence; Terri Clark	Top New Vocal Duo or Group
Barbara Mandrell; Jane Seymour	Entertainer of the Year
