= See What You Want to See =

Studio album by Radney Foster
- Released: May 18, 1999
- Genre: Country, pop, folk rock
- Length: 42:26
- Label: Arista
- Producer: Darrell Brown "The Kiss" co-Produced by Radney Foster, Mac McAnally and Darrell Brown

Radney Foster chronology
Labor of Love (1995)	See What You Want to See (1999)	Are You Ready for the Big Show? (2001)

Singles from See What You Want to See
- 1. "I'm In" Released: 1998

See What You Want to See is American country music artist Radney Foster's third studio album. It was released in 1999 on Arista Records. The record features a number of notable guests, such as Darius Rucker from Hootie & the Blowfish, as well as Abra Moore and Emmylou Harris. Singles from this album were "I'm In" and "Godspeed (Sweet Dreams)."

== Content ==
"Raining on Sunday" was later recorded by Keith Urban on his 2002 album Golden Road, from which it was released as a single in 2003. The Kinleys released a cover of "I'm In" from the 2000 album II, which Foster produced; ten years later, Urban released his version of the same song as a single from his 2009 album Defying Gravity. Additionally, the Dixie Chicks released a cover of "Godspeed (Sweet Dreams)", from their 2002 album Home, in 2003.

== Critical reception ==
Stephen Thomas Erlewine of Allmusic rated the album four stars out of five. He called its sound "classy, mature pop music" and thought that "I'm In," "Folding Money" and "Angry Heart" "showcase him at his best as a songwriter while successfully delivering a fresh, updated sound."

== Track listing ==
All songs written by Radney Foster except where noted.

1. "I've Got a Picture" – 4:43
2. "I'm In" (Foster, Georgia Middleman) – 5:18
  - duet with Abra Moore
3. "Raining on Sunday" (Darrell Brown, Foster) – 3:57
  - duet with Darius Rucker
4. "Folding Money" – 4:16
  - duet with Patrice Pike
5. "Angry Heart" (Stephany Delray, Foster) – 4:04
6. "The Kiss" – 3:59
7. "You Were So Right" (Brown, Delray, Foster) – 3:29
8. "God Knows When" – 4:17
9. "The Lucky Ones" – 3:29
10. "Godspeed (Sweet Dreams)" – 4:54
  - duet Emmylou Harris

== Personnel ==
As listed in liner notes.

=== Production ===
- Produced by Darrell Brown except "This Kiss" was Co-Produced by Radney Foster, Mac McAnally & Darrell Brown
- Executive Producer: Steve Schnur
- Mixed by Niko Bolas Assisted by Greg Parker
- Engineered by Tye Bellar, Niko Bolas, Sam Hewitt & Mike Poole
- Digital Editing By Giles Reaves
- Mastered by Dave Collins

=== Musicians ===
- Darrell Brown – celesta on "Raining on Sunday"
- John Catchings – cello
- Chad Cromwell – drums, percussion
- Radney Foster – acoustic guitar, lead vocals, background vocals
- Bob Glaub – bass guitar, baritone guitar
- Kenny Greenberg – electric guitar solo on "I'm In"
- Rami Jaffee – Hammond B-3 organ, Wurlitzer electric piano
- Jay Joyce – electric guitar
- Craig Krampf – tambourine on "I've Got a Picture" and "I'm In"
- Mike McAdam – slide guitar on "The Kiss" and "God Knows When", baritone guitar solo on "I've Got a Picture"
- Mac McAnally – acoustic guitar on "Raining on Sunday", mandolin on "Folding Money"
- Dennis Matkosky – Hammond B-3 organ on "You Were So Right"
- Abra Moore – vocals on "I'm In"
- Bob Mummert – drums on "The Kiss"
- Patrice Pike – vocals on "Folding Money"
- Michael Rhodes – bass guitar on "The Kiss" and "You Were So Right", fretless bass solo on "Godspeed (Sweet Dreams)"
- Tammy Rogers – viola on "The Kiss"
- Darius Rucker – background vocals on "Raining on Sunday"
- Pete Wasner – accordion on "The Kiss"
