= John Willis (musician) =

American session guitarist and songwriter

- Born: John David Willis; St. Martinville, Louisiana
- Genres: Country, pop, and Christian music
- Occupation: Session musician
- Instruments: Guitar, banjo
- Years active: 1981–present
- Website: johndwillis.com

John David Willis is an American guitarist and songwriter. He is best known for his work as a session musician, producer, and songwriter.

== Biography ==
John Willis was raised in St. Martinville, Louisiana. At age 15, he learned to play banjo and then guitar. At age 22, Willis moved to Los Angeles, where he studied guitar at the Guitar Institute of Technology. Upon graduation, Willis moved to Muscle Shoals, Alabama, where he began playing guitar in sessions for Shenandoah, Brian McKnight, The Impressions, and others.

Upon the suggestion of David Briggs, Willis moved to Nashville. Since then, Willis has played on many hit records for Shania Twain, Taylor Swift, Willie Nelson, and many others.

Willis’ songs have been featured on television networks and video games. He also produces custom albums, songwriter demos, jingles, and voiceovers in his studio, Mount Willis Productions.

In 2002, Willis won the Guitarist of The Year award from the Academy of Country Music.

== Discography ==
This section contains a partial list of albums Willis has contributed to.

=== 1981 - 1989 ===
- 1981: Byrne & Barnes - An Eye For An Eye (Climax)
- 1983: Mac McAnally - Nothing But the Truth (Geffen)
- 1983: Percy Sledge - Percy! (Monument)
- 1984: C. L. Blast - C. L. Blast (Park Place)
- 1984: Clarence Carter - Singing for my Supper (Big C)
- 1984: Blaze Foley - Blaze Foley (Vital)
- 1985: The Forester Sisters - The Forester Sisters (Warner Bros.
- 1986: Alabama - The Touch (RCA)
- 1986: The Forester Sisters - Perfume, Ribbons & Pearls (Warner Bros.)
- 1986: The Kendalls - Fire at First Sight (MCA / Curb)
- 1987: Alabama - Just Us (RCA)
- 1987: The Forester Sisters - You Again (Warner Bros.)
- 1987: T. G. Sheppard - One for the Money (Columbia)

=== 1990 - 1994 ===
- 1990: Matraca Berg - Lying to the Moon (RCA)
- 1990: Robin Lee - Black Velvet (Atlantic)
- 1991: Lionel Cartwright - Chasin' the Sun (MCA)
- 1991: Billy Dean - Billy Dean (Liberty)
- 1991: Robin Lee - Heart on a Chain (Atlantic)
- 1991: The Marcy Brothers - The Marcy Brothers (Atlantic)
- 1991: Randy Travis - High Lonesome (Warner Bros.)
- 1992: Brian McKnight - Brian McKnight (Mercury)
- 1992: Michelle Wright - Now and Then (Arista)
- 1993: Matraca Berg - The Speed of Grace (RCA)
- 1993: Beth Nielsen Chapman - You Hold the Key (Reprise)
- 1993: Billy Dean - Fire in the Dark (Liberty)
- 1993: Barbara Fairchild - The Son in My Eyes (Benson Music Group)
- 1993: Sammy Kershaw - Haunted Heart (Mercury)
- 1993: Toby Keith - Toby Keith (Mercury)
- 1993: Dude Mowrey - Dude Mowrey (Arista)
- 1993: Shania Twain - Shania Twain (Mercury)
- 1993: The Winans - All Out (Warner Bros.)
- 1994: BlackHawk - BlackHawk (Arista Nashville)
- 1994: James House - Days Gone By (Columbia)
- 1994: La Toya Jackson - From Nashville to You (Mar-Gor)
- 1994: Pat McLaughlin - Unglued (Dos)
- 1994: Michelle Wright - The Reasons Why (Arista)

=== 1995 - 1999 ===
- 1995: Lonestar - Lonestar (BNA)
- 1995: Victoria Shaw - In Full View (Reprise)
- 1996: Terri Clark - Just the Same (Mercury)
- 1996: Jeff Foxworthy - Crank It Up: The Music Album (Warner Bros.)
- 1996: Ty Herndon - Living in a Moment (Epic)
- 1996: The Kinleys - Just Between You and Me (Epic)
- 1997: John Anderson - Takin' the Country Back (Mercury)
- 1997: Sheri Easter - Sheri (Spring Hill)
- 1997: LeAnn Rimes - You Light Up My Life: Inspirational Songs (Curb)
- 1998: Terri Clark - How I Feel (Mercury)
- 1998: Billy Ray Cyrus - Shot Full of Love (Mercury)
- 1998: LeAnn Rimes - Sittin' on Top of the World (Curb)
- 1998: The Wilkinsons - Nothing but Love (Giant)
- 1998: Mark Wills - Wish You Were Here (Mercury)
- 1999: Faith Hill - Breathe (Warner Bros.)
- 1999: Alan Jackson - Under the Influence (Arista Nashville)
- 1999: Kris Kristofferson - The Austin Sessions (Atlantic)
- 1999: Tim McGraw - A Place in the Sun (Curb)
- 1999: Rosie O'Donnell - A Rosie Christmas (Columbia)
- 1999: John Rich - Underneath the Same Moon (BNA / Legacy)

=== 2000 - 2004 ===
- 2000: Chad Brock - Yes! (Warner Bros.)
- 2000: Andrew Gold - The Spence Manor Suite (Dome)
- 2000: Eric Heatherly - Swimming in Champagne (Mercury)
- 2000: The Kinleys - II (Epic)
- 2000: Tracy Lawrence - Lessons Learned (Atlantic)
- 2000: Jo Dee Messina - Burn
- 2001: Jewel - This Way (Atlantic)
- 2002: India.Arie - Voyage to India (Motown)
- 2002: Kenny Chesney - No Shoes, No Shirt, No Problems (BNA)
- 2002: Jude Johnstone - Coming of Age (BoJak)
- 2002: Shania Twain - Up! (Mercury)
- 2003: Gary Allan - See If I Care (MCA Nashville)
- 2003: Wynonna Judd - What the World Needs Now is Love (Curb)
- 2003: Blake Shelton - The Dreamer (Warner Bros. Nashville)
- 2003: Rey Thomas - What If I Am (ZYX Music)
- 2004: Montgomery Gentry - You Do Your Thing (Columbia)
- 2004: Carolyn Dawn Johnson - Dress Rehearsal (Arista Nashville)
- 2004: The Kinleys - All in the Family (Identical)
- 2004: Gretchen Wilson - Here for the Party (Epic)

=== 2005 - 2009 ===
- 2005: Chris Cagle - Anywhere but Here (Capitol Nashville)
- 2005: Kenny Chesney - Be as You Are (Songs from an Old Blue Chair) (BNA)
- 2005: Kenny Chesney - The Road and the Radio (BNA)
- 2005: Billy Currington - Doin' Somethin' Right (Mercury)
- 2005: LeAnn Rimes - This Woman (Curb)
- 2005: Van Zant - Get Right with the Man (Columbia)
- 2005: The Wilkinsons - Highway (33rd Street)
- 2005: Gretchen Wilson - All Jacked Up (Sony BMG)
- 2005: Chely Wright - The Metropolitan Hotel (Painted Red / Dualtone)
- 2006: Rodney Atkins - If You're Going Through Hell (Curb)
- 2006: Jamey Johnson - The Dollar (BNA)
- 2007: John Anderson - Easy Money (Warner Bros.)
- 2007: Brooks & Dunn - Cowboy Town (Arista Nashville)
- 2007: Kenny Chesney - Just Who I Am: Poets & Pirates (BNA)
- 2007: Van Zant - My Kind of Country (Sony BMG)
- 2007: Gretchen Wilson - One of the Boys (Sony BMG Nashville)
- 2008: Melonie Cannon - And the Wheel Turns (Rural Rhythm)
- 2008: Jill Johnson - Baby Blue Paper (Lionheart)
- 2008: Willie Nelson - Moment of Forever (Lost Highway)
- 2008: Taylor Swift - Beautiful Eyes (Big Machine)
- 2008: Taylor Swift - Taylor Swift (Big Machine)
- 2009: Luke Bryan - Doin' My Thing (Capitol)

=== 2010 - 2014 ===
- 2010: Gary Allan - Get Off on the Pain (MCA Nashville)
- 2010: Johnny Mathis - Let It Be Me: Mathis in Nashville (Columbia)
- 2010: Jimmy Webb - Just Across the River (Victor)
- 2011: Trace Adkins - Proud to Be Here (Show Dog Nashville)
- 2011: Luke Bryan - Tailgates & Tanlines (Capitol Nashville)
- 2011: Billy Ray Cyrus - I'm American (Buena Vista)
- 2012: Kenny Chesney - Welcome to the Fishbowl (Columbia Nashville)
- 2012: Lionel Richie - Tuskegee (Mercury)
- 2013: Trace Adkins - Love Will... (Show Dog Nashville)
- 2013: Alabama - Alabama & Friends (Universal Music)
- 2013: Kenny Chesney - Life on a Rock (Columbia Nashville)
- 2013: Tracy Lawrence - Headlights, Taillights and Radios (Lawrence Music Group)
- 2013: Kenny Rogers - You Can't Make Old Friends (Warner Bros.)
- 2013: Blake Shelton - Based on a True Story... (Warner Bros.)
- 2013: Tate Stevens - Tate Stevens (RCA / Syco Music)
- 2013: B. J. Thomas - The Living Room Sessions (Wrinkled)
- 2014: Kenny Chesney - The Big Revival (BNA)
- 2014: Bill Engvall - Ultimate Laughs (Warner Bros.)
- 2014: Ray Price - Beauty Is... The Final Sessions (AmeriMonte)

=== 2015 - present ===
- 2015: T. Graham Brown - Forever Changed (Mansion)
- 2015: Reuben James Richards - About Time (Jigsaw)
- 2015: Kenny Rogers - Once Again It's Christmas (Warner Bros.)
- 2015: Corey Smith - While the Gettin' Is Good (Sugar Hill)
- 2015: Steve Tyrell - That Lovin' Feeling (Concord)
- 2015: Aaron Watson - The Underdog (Big Label / Thirty Tigers)
- 2016: Jason Aldean - They Don't Know (Sony)
- 2016: Derek Johnson - South Side of Heaven (Star Farm Nashville)
- 2016: Barrett Baber - A Room Full of Fighters (Gray Dog)
- 2016: Cody Johnson - Gotta Be Me (Cojo)
- 2016: Willie Nelson - For the Good Times: A Tribute to Ray Price (Legacy)
- 2017: Big & Rich - Did It for the Party (Big & Rich / Thirty Tigers)
- 2017: Lee Brice - Lee Brice (Curb)
- 2017: Amanda McBroom - Voices (Gecko)
- 2017: Jerrod Niemann - This Ride (Curb)
- 2017: Michael Tyler - 317 (Reviver)
- 2017: Gretchen Wilson - Ready to Get Rowdy (Redneck)
