= 33rd TNN/Music City News Country Awards =

US country music awards ceremony in 1999

- Date: June 14, 1999
- Location: Grand Ole Opry House, Nashville, Tennessee
- Hosted by: Jeff Foxworthy

Highlights
- Most wins: Faith Hill (5)
- Most nominations: Faith Hill (6)

Television/radio coverage
- Network: TNN

The 33rd TNN/Music City News Country Awards was held on June 14, 1999, at the Grand Ole Opry House, in Nashville, Tennessee . The ceremony was hosted by Jeff Foxworthy. This would be the last Music City News Awards show to be held at the Grand Ole Opry House.

== Winners and nominees ==
Winners are shown in bold.

Entertainer of the Year	Album of the Year
**Neal McCoy**; Garth Brooks; Alan Jackson; George Strait; Shania Twain	**One Step at a Time — George Strait**; Come On Over — Shania Twain; Faith — Faith Hill; High Mileage — Alan Jackson; Wide Open Spaces — The Dixie Chicks
Female Artist of the Year	Male Artist of the Year
**Faith Hill**; Martina McBride; Reba McEntire; Shania Twain; Trisha Yearwood	**Tim McGraw**; Garth Brooks; Vince Gill; Alan Jackson; George Strait
Vocal Group or Duo of the Year	Vocal Band of the Year
**Brooks & Dunn**; The Kinleys; The Lynns; The Statlers; The Wilkinsons	**The Dixie Chicks**; Alabama; BlackHawk; Diamond Rio; Sawyer Brown
Single of the Year	Song of the Year
"**This Kiss**" — **Faith Hill**; "Don't Laugh at Me" — Mark Wills; "I Just Want to Dance with You" — George Strait; "I'll Go On Loving You" — Alan Jackson; "Holes in the Floor of Heaven" — Steve Wariner	"**Just to Hear You Say That You Love Me**" — **Diane Warren**; "Don't Laugh at Me" — Allen Shamblin and Steve Seskin; "I Just Want to Dance with You" — Roger Cook and John Prine; "Holes in the Floor of Heaven" — Billy Kirsch and Steve Wariner; "This Kiss" — Beth Nielsen Chapman, Robin Lerner, Annie Roboff
Male Star of Tomorrow	Female Star of Tomorrow
**Michael Peterson**; Gary Allan; Keith Harling; Sons of the Desert; The Wilkinsons	**The Dixie Chicks**; Anita Cochran; Sara Evans; The Kinleys; Lila McCann
Video of the Year	Vocal Collaboration of the Year
"**This Kiss**" — **Faith Hill**; "Don't Laugh at Me" — Mark Wills; "Getcha Some" — Toby Keith; "Holes in the Floor of Heaven" — Steve Wariner; "I'll Go On Loving You" — Alan Jackson	**"Just to Hear You Say That You Love Me"** — **Faith Hill** **and** **Tim McGraw**; "From This Moment On" — Bryan White and Shania Twain; "If You See Him/If You See Her" — Brooks & Dunn and Reba McEntire; "No Place That Far" — Sara Evans and Vince Gill; "Where Your Road Leads" — Garth Brooks and Trisha Yearwood
Living Legend Award
**Charlie Daniels**
Minnie Pearl Award
**Roy Clark**

== See also ==
- CMT Music Awards
