= Country Music Association Award for Vocal Duo of the Year =

Annual music award

- Country: United States
- Presented by: Country Music Association
- First award: 1967
- Currently held by: Brooks & Dunn (2026)

The following list shows the recipients for the Country Music Association Award for Vocal Duo of the Year. The award is based on the musical performance of the duo on solo country single or album release, as well as their overall contribution to country music during the eligibility period. For the purposes of the award, a duo is defined as "an act composed of two people, both of whom normally perform together and neither of whom is known primarily as an individual performing artist", though this was not always the case.

The award was originally presented in 1970 as a spin-off of the Country Music Association Award for Vocal Group of the Year. The inaugural recipients were Dolly Parton and Porter Wagoner. Brooks & Dunn hold the record for most wins in the category, with fourteen, and have a record-setting twenty four nominations. The Judds were the first all-female duo in 1988 and are, to date, the only female duo to win. The Bellamy Brothers holds the record for most nominations without a win, with fifteen. Nine artists (Barbara Mandrell, Bill Anderson, Crystal Gayle, Dottie West, George Jones, Kenny Rogers, Merle Haggard, Parton and Willie Nelson) have received nominations as part of more than one duo.

== Recipients ==
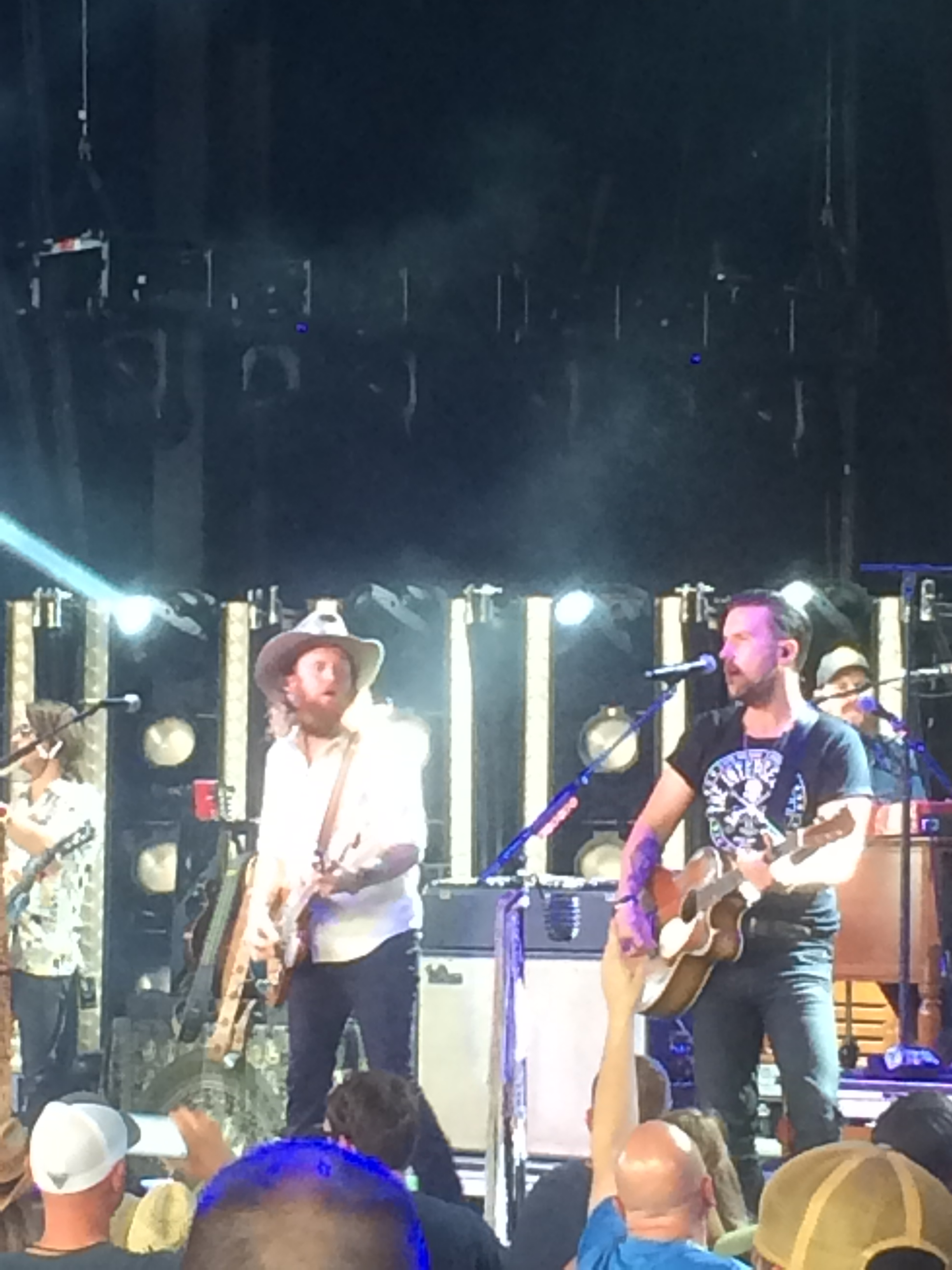
Brothers Osborne have received the award five times and are the first siblings to win.

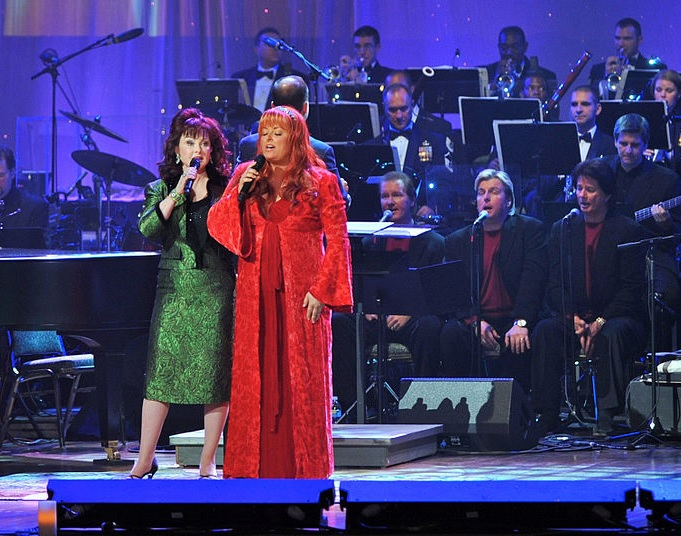
Four-time recipients The Judds are the only female duo to win.

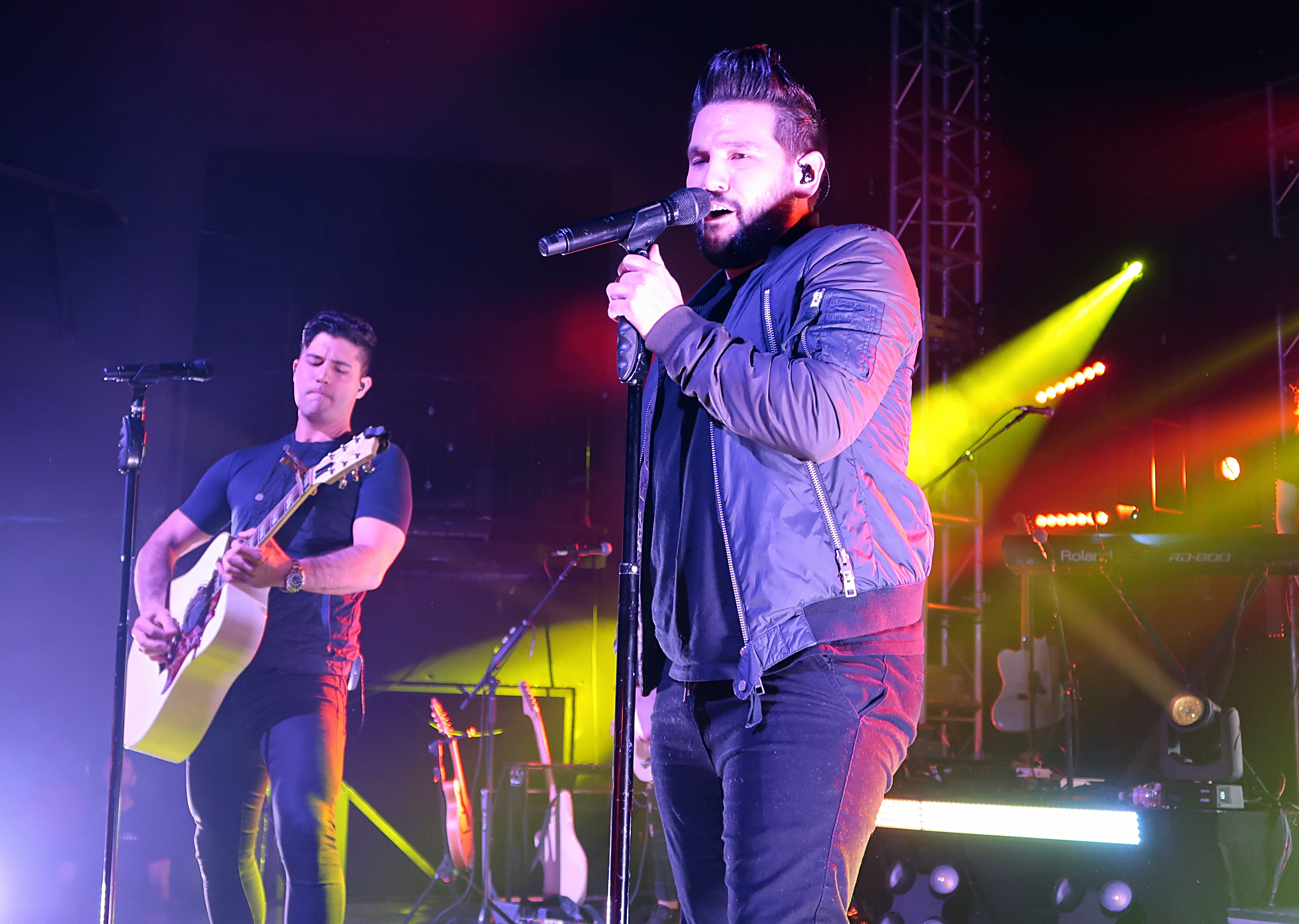
Two-time winners Dan + Shay.

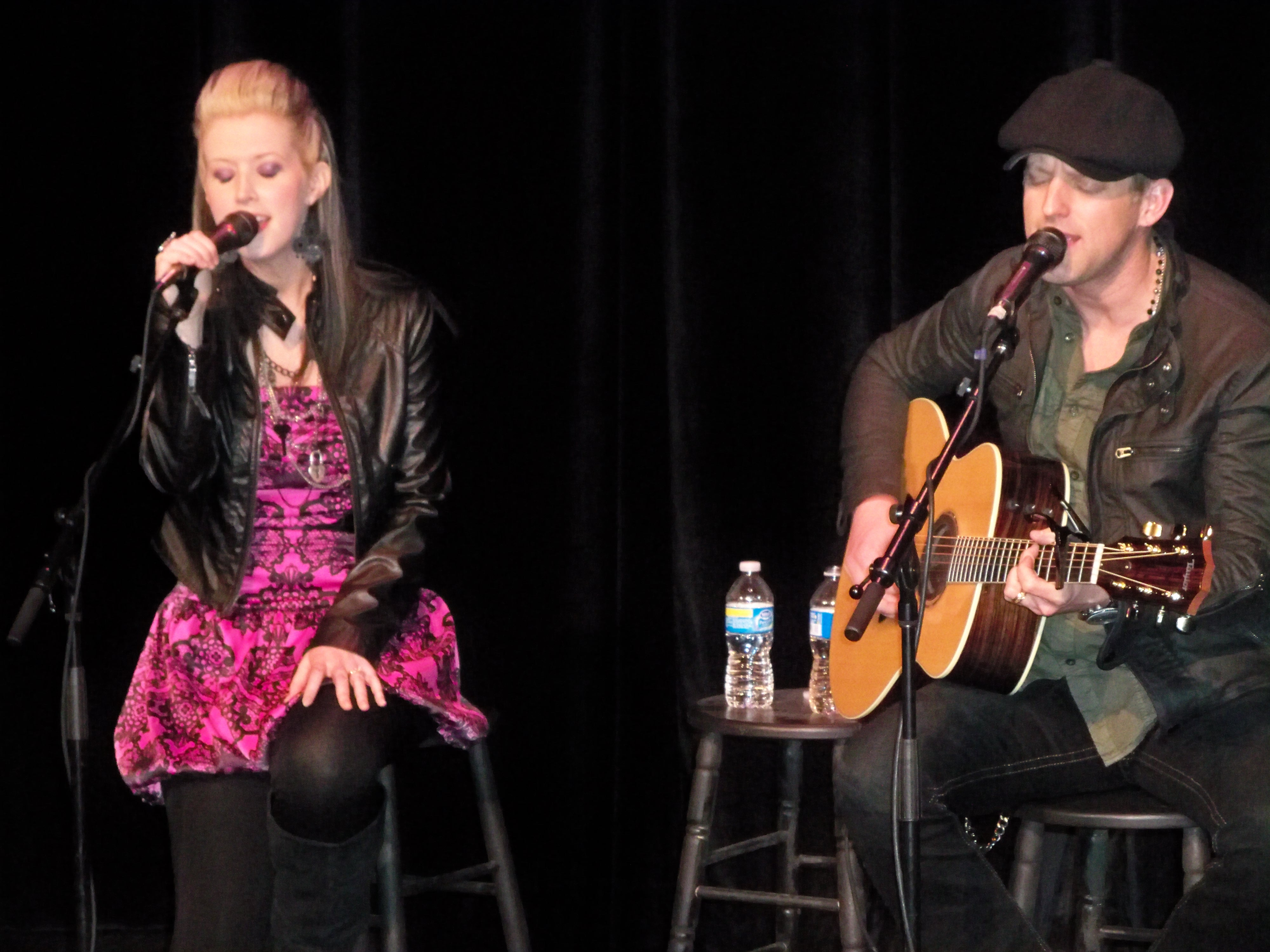
Thompson Square received the award in 2012.

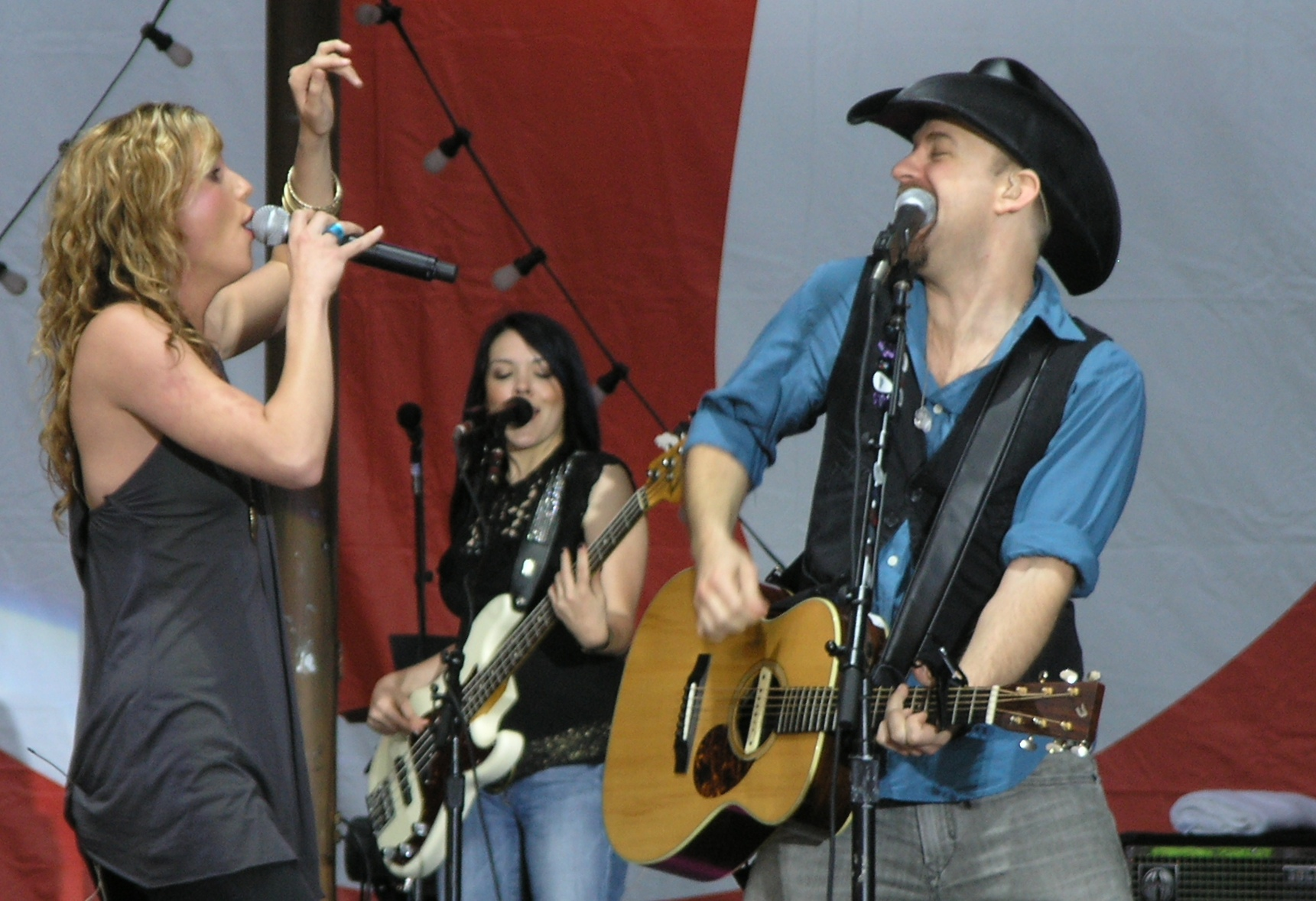
Five-time recipients Sugarland.

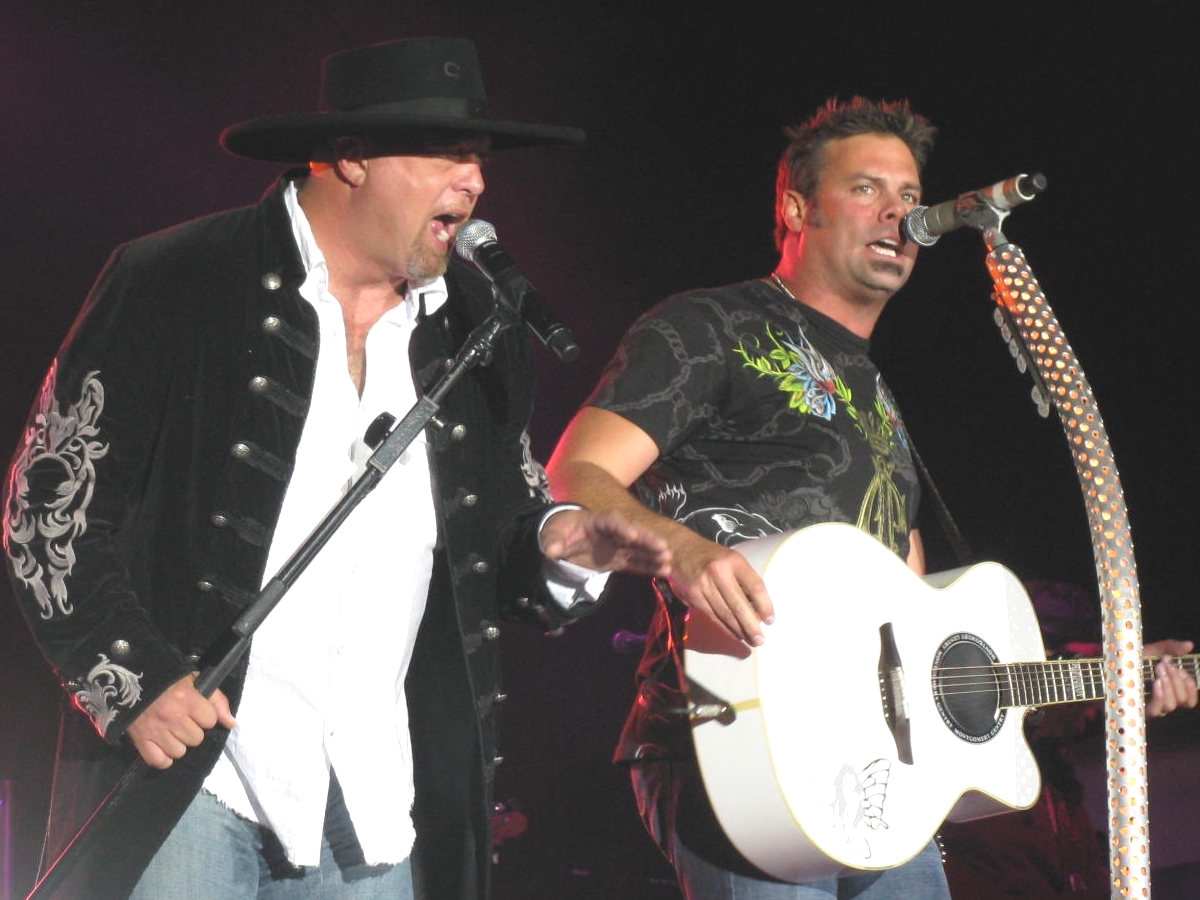
2000 winners Montgomery Gentry.

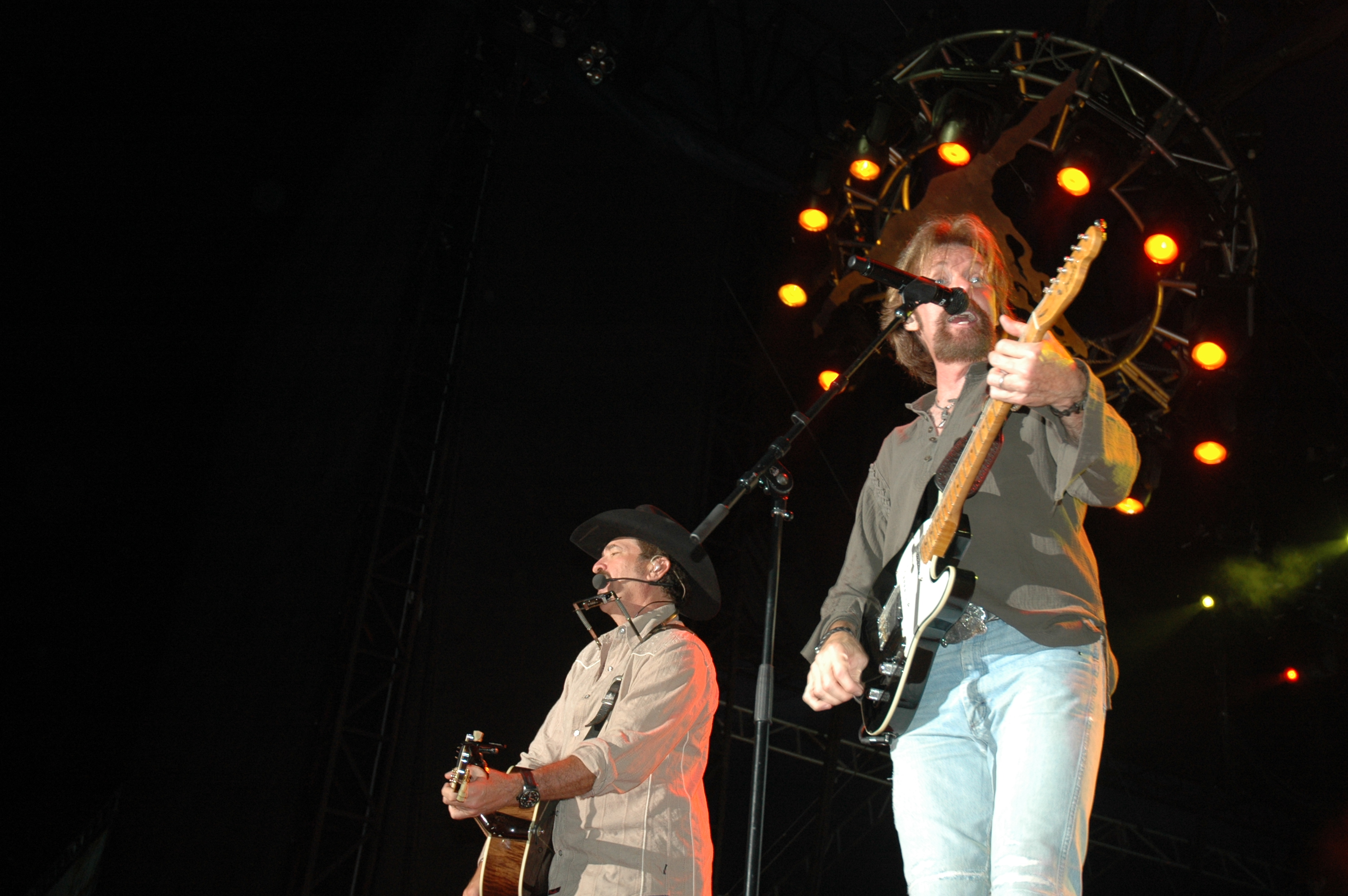
Brooks & Dunn hold the record for most wins in this category with sixteen.

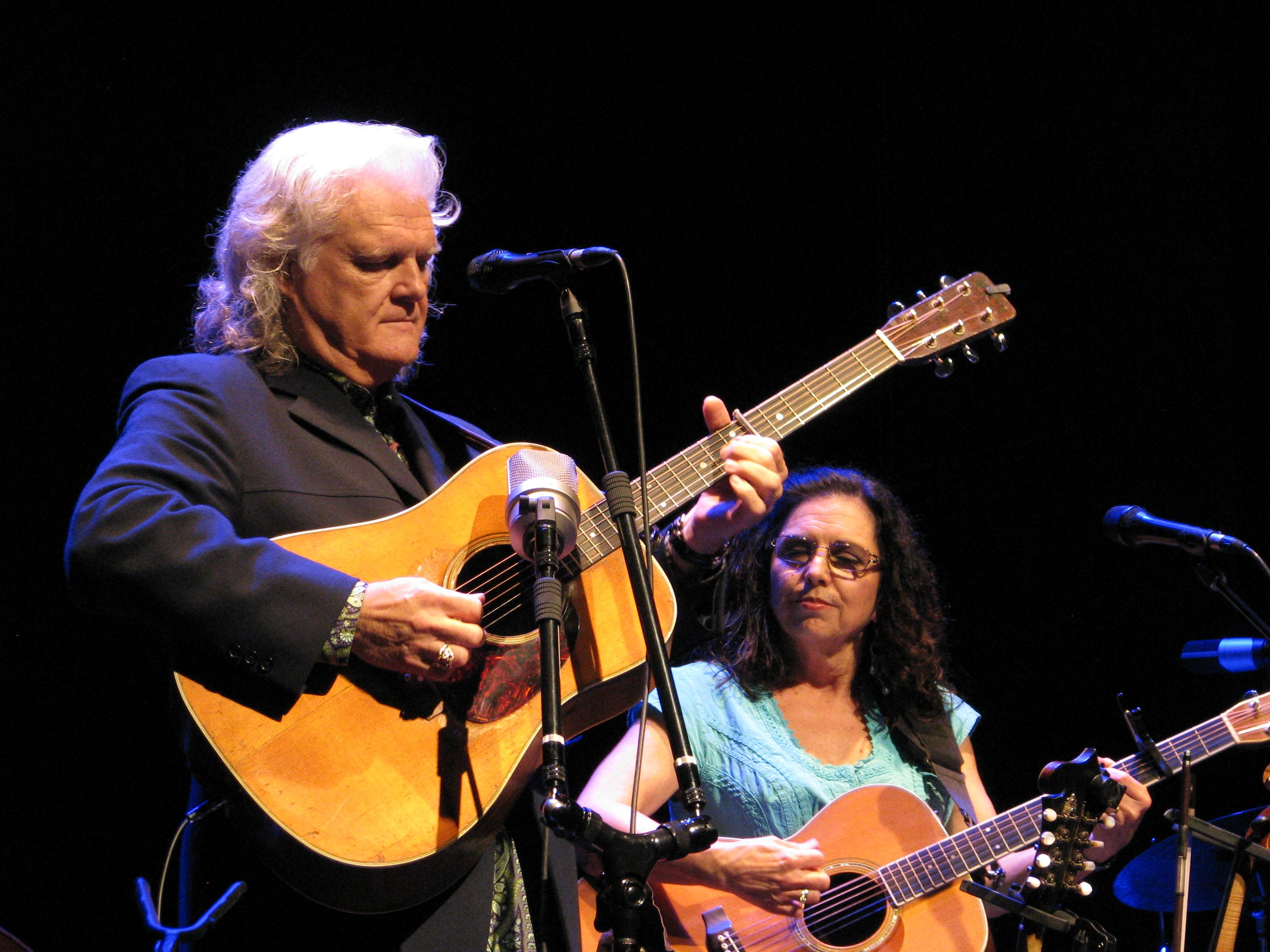
Husband and wife duo Ricky Skaggs and Sharon White received the award in 1987.

Year	Winner	Nominees
2026	Brooks & Dunn	Brothers Osborne; Dan + Shay; Muscadine Bloodline; Thelma & James
2025	Brooks & Dunn	Brothers Osborne; Dan + Shay; Maddie & Tae; The War and Treaty
2024	Brooks & Dunn	Brothers Osborne; Dan + Shay; Maddie & Tae; The War and Treaty
2023	Brothers Osborne	Brooks & Dunn; Dan + Shay; Maddie & Tae; The War and Treaty
2022	Brothers Osborne	Brooks & Dunn; Dan + Shay; LoCash; Maddie & Tae
2021	Brothers Osborne	Brooks & Dunn; Dan + Shay; Florida Georgia Line; Maddie & Tae
2020	Dan + Shay	Brooks & Dunn; Brothers Osborne; Florida Georgia Line; Maddie & Tae
2019	Dan + Shay	Brooks & Dunn; Brothers Osborne; Florida Georgia Line; Maddie & Tae
2018	Brothers Osborne	Dan + Shay; Florida Georgia Line; Sugarland; Maddie & Tae
2017	Brothers Osborne	Dan + Shay; Florida Georgia Line; LoCash; Maddie & Tae
2016	Brothers Osborne	Dan + Shay; Florida Georgia Line; Joey + Rory; Maddie & Tae
2015	Florida Georgia Line	Brothers Osborne; Dan + Shay; Maddie & Tae; Thompson Square
2014	Florida Georgia Line	Dan + Shay; Love and Theft; The Swon Brothers; Thompson Square
2013	Florida Georgia Line	The Civil Wars; Big & Rich; Love and Theft; Sugarland; Thompson Square
2012	Thompson Square	Big & Rich; The Civil Wars; Love and Theft; Sugarland
2011	Sugarland	The Civil Wars; Montgomery Gentry; Steel Magnolia; Thompson Square
2010	Sugarland	Big & Rich; Brooks & Dunn; Joey + Rory; Montgomery Gentry
2009	Sugarland	Big & Rich; Brooks & Dunn; Joey + Rory; Steel Magnolia
2008	Sugarland	Big & Rich; Brooks & Dunn; Montgomery Gentry; The Wreckers
2007	Sugarland	Big & Rich; Brooks & Dunn; Montgomery Gentry; The Wreckers
2006	Brooks & Dunn	Big & Rich; Montgomery Gentry; The Wreckers; Van Zant
2005	Brooks & Dunn	Big & Rich; Montgomery Gentry; Van Zant; The Warren Brothers
2004	Brooks & Dunn	Big & Rich; Blue County; Montgomery Gentry; The Warren Brothers
2003	Brooks & Dunn	The Bellamy Brothers; Montgomery Gentry; Sons of the Desert; The Warren Brothers
2002	Brooks & Dunn	The Bellamy Brothers; Montgomery Gentry; Sons of the Desert; The Warren Brothers
2001	Brooks & Dunn	The Bellamy Brothers; The Kinleys; Montgomery Gentry; The Warren Brothers
2000	Montgomery Gentry	The Bellamy Brothers; Brooks & Dunn; The Kinleys; The Warren Brothers
1999	Brooks & Dunn	The Kinleys; The Lynns; Montgomery Gentry; The Warren Brothers
1998	Brooks & Dunn	The Bellamy Brothers; The Kinleys; The Lynns; Thrasher Shiver
1997	Brooks & Dunn	The Bellamy Brothers; The Raybon Brothers; Thrasher Shiver; John & Audrey Wiggins
1996	Brooks & Dunn	Baker & Myers; The Bellamy Brothers; John & Audrey Wiggins; Sweethearts of the Rodeo
1995	Brooks & Dunn	The Bellamy Brothers; Brother Phelps; John & Audrey Wiggins; Sweethearts of the Rodeo
1994	Brooks & Dunn	The Bellamy Brothers; Brother Phelps; Orrall & Wright; Sweethearts of the Rodeo
1993	Brooks & Dunn	The Bellamy Brothers; Darryl & Don Ellis; Sweethearts of the Rodeo
1992	Brooks & Dunn	Baillie and the Boys; The Bellamy Brothers; The Judds; Sweethearts of the Rodeo
1991	The Judds	Baillie and the Boys; The Bellamy Brothers; Foster & Lloyd; Sweethearts of the Rodeo
1990	The Judds	Baillie and the Boys; The Bellamy Brothers; Foster & Lloyd; Sweethearts of the Rodeo
1989	The Judds	Baillie and the Boys; The Bellamy Brothers; Foster & Lloyd; Sweethearts of the Rodeo
1988	The Judds	The Bellamy Brothers; Foster & Lloyd; The O'Kanes; Sweethearts of the Rodeo
1987	Ricky Skaggs and Sharon White	Dan Seals and Marie Osmond; Earl Thomas Conley and Anita Pointer; Gary Morris and Crystal Gayle; Michael Martin Murphey and Holly Dunn
1986	Dan Seals and Marie Osmond	Dolly Parton and Kenny Rogers; Gary Morris and Crystal Gayle; Steve Wariner and Nicolette Larson; Waylon Jennings and Willie Nelson
1985	Anne Murray and Dave Loggins	Barbara Mandrell and Lee Greenwood; Dolly Parton and Kenny Rogers; Moe Bandy and Joe Stampley; Willie Nelson and Ray Charles
1984	Willie Nelson and Julio Iglesias	Barbara Mandrell and Lee Greenwood; Dolly Parton and Kenny Rogers; Don Williams and Emmylou Harris; Moe Bandy and Joe Stampley
1983	Willie Nelson and Merle Haggard	David Frizzell and Shelly West; Don Williams and Emmylou Harris; Eddie Rabbitt and Crystal Gayle; Merle Haggard and George Jones
1982	David Frizzell and Shelly West	Conway Twitty and Loretta Lynn; Don Williams and Emmylou Harris; George Jones and Merle Haggard; Waylon Jennings and Willie Nelson
1981	David Frizzell and Shelly West	Conway Twitty and Loretta Lynn; George Jones and Tammy Wynette; Moe Bandy and Joe Stampley; Waylon Jennings and Jessi Colter
1980	Moe Bandy and Joe Stampley	Conway Twitty and Loretta Lynn; George Jones and Tammy Wynette; Janie Fricke and Johnny Duncan; Jim Ed Brown and Helen Cornelius
1979	Kenny Rogers and Dottie West	Conway Twitty and Loretta Lynn; Janie Fricke and Johnny Duncan; Jim Ed Brown and Helen Cornelius; Waylon Jennings and Willie Nelson
1978	Kenny Rogers and Dottie West	Conway Twitty and Loretta Lynn; Janie Fricke and Johnny Duncan; Jim Ed Brown and Helen Cornelius; Waylon Jennings and Willie Nelson
1977	Jim Ed Brown and Helen Cornelius	Bill Anderson and Mary Lou Turner; Conway Twitty and Loretta Lynn; George Jones and Tammy Wynette; Waylon Jennings and Willie Nelson
1976	Waylon Jennings and Willie Nelson	Bill Anderson and Mary Lou Turner; Conway Twitty and Loretta Lynn; George Jones and Tammy Wynette; Mel Tillis and Sherry Bryce
1975	Conway Twitty and Loretta Lynn	Dolly Parton and Porter Wagoner; George Jones and Tammy Wynette; Jack Greene and Jeannie Seely; Mel Tillis and Sherry Bryce
1974	Conway Twitty and Loretta Lynn	Barbara Mandrell and David Houston; Dolly Parton and Porter Wagoner; George Jones and Tammy Wynette; Jack Greene and Jeannie Seely
1973	Conway Twitty and Loretta Lynn	Barbara Mandrell and David Houston; Dolly Parton and Porter Wagoner; George Jones and Tammy Wynette; Jack Greene and Jeannie Seely
1972	Conway Twitty and Loretta Lynn	Dolly Parton and Porter Wagoner; George Jones and Tammy Wynette; Jack Greene and Jeannie Seely; Johnny Paycheck and Jody Miller
1971	Dolly Parton and Porter Wagoner	Charlie Louvin and Melba Montgomery; Conway Twitty and Loretta Lynn; George Jones and Tammy Wynette; Johnny Cash and June Carter Cash
1970	Dolly Parton and Porter Wagoner	Bill Anderson and Jan Howard; Don Gibson and Dottie West; Johnny Cash and June Carter Cash; Merle Haggard and Bonnie Owens

== Artists with multiple wins ==
Duos that received multiple awards
Awards	Artist
17	Brooks & Dunn
6	Brothers Osborne
5	Sugarland
4	Conway Twitty and Loretta Lynn
4	The Judds
3	Florida Georgia Line
2	Dan + Shay
2	David Frizzell and Shelly West
2	Kenny Rogers and Dottie West

=== Won on First nomination ===
In CMA history, fifteen duos have won Duo of the Year the very first time they were nominated. They are:

- Dolly Parton and Porter Wagoner (1970)
- Waylon Jennings and Willie Nelson (1975)
- Jim Ed Brown and Helen Cornelius (1977)
- Kenny Rogers and Dottie West (1978)
- Moe Bandy and Joe Stampley (1980)
- David Frizzell and Shelly West (1981)
- Willie Nelson and Merle Haggard (1983)
- Willie Nelson and Julio Iglesias (1984)
- Anne Murray and Dave Loggins (1985)
- Dan Seals and Marie Osmond (1986)
- Ricky Skaggs and Sharon White (1987)
- The Judds (1988)
- Brooks & Dunn (1992)
- Sugarland (2007)
- Florida Georgia Line (2013)

== Artists with multiple nominations ==
25 nominations

- Brooks & Dunn

15 nominations

- The Bellamy Brothers

13 nominations

- Dan + Shay
- Montgomery Gentry

12 nominations

- Conway Twitty and Loretta Lynn

11 nominations

- George Jones

10 nominations

- Brothers Osborne
- Maddie & Tae

9 nominations

- Big & Rich
- Dolly Parton
- Florida Georgia Line
- Sweethearts of the Rodeo
- Tammy Wynette
- Willie Nelson

7 nominations

- Sugarland
- The Warren Brothers
- Waylon Jennings

6 nominations

- Porter Wagoner

5 nominations

- Kenny Rogers
- The Judds
- Thompson Square

4 nominations

- Baillie & the Boys
- Barbara Mandrell
- Foster & Lloyd
- Jack Greene and Jeannie Seely
- Jim Ed Brown and Helen Cornelius
- Merle Haggard
- Moe Bandy and Joe Stampley
- The Kinleys

3 nominations

- Bill Anderson
- Crystal Gayle
- David Frizzell and Shelly West
- Don Williams and Emmylou Harris
- Dottie West
- Janie Fricke and Johnny Duncan
- Joey + Rory
- John & Audrey Wiggins
- Love and Theft
- The Civil Wars
- The Wreckers

2 nominations

- Brother Phelps
- Dan Seals and Marie Osmond
- David Houston
- Gary Morris
- Lee Greenwood
- LoCash
- Mary Lou Turner
- Mel Tillis and Sherry Bryce
- Johnny Cash and June Carter Cash
- Sons of the Desert
- Steel Magnolia
- The Lynns
- The War and Treaty
- Thrasher Shiver
- Van Zant
