= Another Way to Go =

Studio album by Radney Foster
- Released: September 10, 2002
- Genre: Country
- Length: 47:07
- Label: Dualtone
- Producer: Radney Foster

Radney Foster chronology
Are You Ready for the Big Show? (2001)	Another Way to Go (2002)	And Then There's Me (The Back Porch Sessions) (2005)

Professional ratings
Review scores
Source	Rating
Allmusic	3/5 stars

Another Way to Go is the fifth full-length album by country music singer-songwriter Radney Foster. It was released in 2002 on Dualtone Records; his second for the label.

As with his previous records, he featured in the production. He also engineered the disc, and wrote five songs by himself, as well as co-writing the other eight songs. The disc peaked at number 39, and featured two singles; "Everyday Angel" (peaked at number 43) and "Scary Old World" (which reached number 52). Also included is "A Real Fine Place to Start," which became a number 1 hit in 2005 for Sara Evans from her album Real Fine Place.

== Track listing ==
1. "A Real Fine Place to Start" (Radney Foster, George Ducas) – 3:45
2. "Everyday Angel" (Foster) – 4:29
3. "Again" (Foster, Darrell Brown) – 3:28
4. "Sure Feels Right" (Foster) – 3:42
5. "Disappointing You" (Foster) – 4:20
6. "I Got What You Need" (Foster, James George Sonefeld) – 4:09
7. "Tired of Pretending" (Foster, Stephany Delray) – 4:01
8. "What Is It That You Do" (Foster, Brown) – 3:14
9. "Scary Old World" (Foster, Harlan Howard) – 3:59
  - duet with Chely Wright
10. "Love Had Something to Say About It" (Foster) – 3:46
11. "What Are We Doing Here Tonight" (Foster, Chip Boyd) – 3:36
12. "Just Sit Still" (Foster) – 4:18
13. "Another Way to Go" (Foster, Brown) – 4:17

== Production ==
- Produced By Radney Foster
- Engineers: Radney Foster, Chuck Linder, King Williams, Casey Wood
- Mixing: Casey Wood
- Mastering: Dave Collins

== Personnel ==
- Accordion: Tony Harrell
- Acoustic Guitar: Radney Foster
- Additional Vocals: Melinda Doolittle, Radney Foster, Christy Hathcock, Georgia Middleman, James Paulich, Kim Richey, Andy Thompson, Matt Thompson
- Bass, Upright Bass: Larry Paxton
- Cello: John Catchings
- Drums, Percussion: Matt Thompson
- Duet Vocals On "Scary Old World": Chely Wright
- Electric guitar: Radney Foster, Mike McAdam, Joe Pisapia, Andy Thompson
- Fiddle: Barbara Lamb
- Hammer Dulcimer: Craig Duncan
- Lead Vocals: Radney Foster
- Mandolin: Chris Thile
- Percussion: Casey Wood
- Piano, Hammond organ, Accordion, Wurlitzer: Tony Harrell
- Saxophone: Jim Hoke
- Slide: Mike McAdam
- Steel: Pete Finney
- Vocal Arrangement By Darrell Brown

== Chart performance ==
Chart (2002)	Peak position
U.S. Billboard Top Country Albums	39
