= She Ain't the Girl for You =

Single by The Kinleys

from the album II
- B-side: "Somebody's Out There Watching"
- Released: April 1, 2000
- Genre: Country
- Length: 3:32
- Label: Epic
- Songwriter(s): Vince Melamed, Jon McElroy
- Producer(s): Russ Zavitson, Tony Haselden, Pete Greene

The Kinleys singles chronology
"My Heart Is Still Beating" (1999)	"She Ain't the Girl for You" (2000)	"I'm In" (2000)

"She Ain't the Girl for You" is a song recorded by American country music duo The Kinleys. It was released in April 2000 as the first single from the album II. The song reached #34 on the Billboard Hot Country Singles & Tracks chart. The song was written by Vince Melamed and Jon McElroy.

Chely Wright sings background vocals on the song.

== Chart performance ==
Chart (2000)	Peak position
US Hot Country Songs (Billboard)	34
Canadian RPM Country Tracks	48
