= Just Between You and Me (The Kinleys album) =

Studio album by the Kinleys
- Released: September 23, 1997
- Genre: Country
- Length: 34:30
- Label: Epic Nashville
- Producer: Russ Zavitson; Tony Haselden; Pete Greene

The Kinleys chronology
Just Between You and Me (1997)	II (2000)

Singles from Just Between You and Me
- 1. "Please" Released: July 21, 1997; 2. "Just Between You and Me" Released: December 20, 1997; 3. "Dance in the Boat" Released: April 27, 1998; 4. "You Make It Seem So Easy" Released: June 29, 1998

Just Between You and Me is the debut album by the American country music duo the Kinleys, released in 1997 under Epic Nashville Records. The album produced four singles, all of which charted on the Billboard country singles charts. The first two — "Please" and the title track — were both Top Twenty hits, peaking at No. 7 and No. 12 respectively. Following these were "Dance in the Boat" and "You Make It Seem So Easy", at No. 49 and No. 48.

== Critical reception ==
Professional ratings
Review scores
Source	Rating
AllMusic	3/5 stars
Robert Christgau	A−

Robert Christgau wrote: "So womanly they seem almost kinky, harmonizing twin sisters explore a range of Nashville life choices—crazy in love or desperate to get back there, lazing around or sleeping around or pondering separations that put mere breaking up in existential perspective."

== Track listing ==
Just Between You and Me track listing
No.	Title	Writer(s)	Length
1.	"Just Between You and Me"	Heather Kinley; Jennifer Kinley; Russ Zavitson; Debbie Zavitson	3:34
2.	"Talk to Me"	H. Kinley; J. Kinley; Sarah Majors	3:32
3.	"You Make It Seem So Easy"	H. Kinley; J. Kinley; Jon McElroy	3:23
4.	"(Ooh, Aah) Crazy Kind of Love Thing"	Spencer Bernard; Tim Norton	3:46
5.	"Please"	Tony Haselden	3:35
6.	"The Real Thing"	Eric Silver	3:22
7.	"Takin' Our Own Sweet Time"	Annette Cotter; David Leonard	3:27
8.	"Love Rules"	H. Kinley; J. Kinley; R. Zavitson; Bill Austin	3:03
9.	"Contradiction"	H. Kinley; J. Kinley; Majors	3:38
10.	"Dance in the Boat"	Haselden; Craig Bickhardt	3:20
11.	"Please" (Acoustic Version)	Haselden	3:32
Total length:			34:30

The acoustic version of "Please" was included in the 1999 European reissue of the album.

== Personnel ==
The Kinleys

- Heather Kinley – lead and background vocals
- Jennifer Kinley – lead and background vocals

Additional musicians

- Eddie Bayers – drums
- Mark Casstevens – acoustic guitar
- Larry Franklin – fiddle
- Shannon Forrest – drums
- Sonny Garrish – steel guitar
- Anthony Martin – background vocals
- Brent Mason – electric guitar
- Terry McMillan – percussion
- Stan Munsey – keyboards
- Steve Nathan – keyboards
- Larry Paxton – bass guitar
- Michael Rhodes – bass guitar
- Brent Rowan – electric guitar
- Mitchell Shedd – percussion
- Biff Watson – acoustic guitar
- John Willis – acoustic guitar

== Charts ==
=== Weekly charts ===
Chart (1997)	Peak position
Canadian Country Albums (RPM)	32
US Billboard 200	153
US Top Country Albums (Billboard)	22
US Heatseekers Albums (Billboard)	6

=== Year-end charts ===
Chart (1998)	Position
US Top Country Albums (Billboard)	46
