= Please (The Kinleys song) =

Single by The Kinleys

from the album Just Between You and Me
- Released: July 21, 1997
- Genre: Country
- Length: 3:35
- Label: Epic
- Songwriter: Tony Haselden
- Producers: Russ Zavitson; Tony Haselden; Pete Greene

The Kinleys singles chronology
"Please" (1997)	"Just Between You and Me" (1998)

"Please" is a debut song written by Tony Haselden, and recorded by American country music duo The Kinleys. It was released in July 1997 as the first single from their debut album Just Between You and Me. The song reached #7 on the Billboard Hot Country Singles & Tracks chart and #67 on the Billboard Hot 100. The song was the twins' only top 10 song on the country chart.

Later in the year, Epic also released an acoustic version of the song.

== Music video ==
The music video was directed by Chris Rogers and premiered in August 1997.

== Chart performance ==
"Please" debuted at number 68 on the U.S. Billboard Hot Country Singles & Tracks for the week of August 2, 1997.

Chart (1997)	Peak position
Canada Country Singles (RPM)	22
US Billboard Hot 100	67
US Hot Country Songs (Billboard)	7
