= Bitter Sweet (Kim Richey album) =

Studio album by Kim Richey
- Released: 1997
- Genre: Country
- Label: Mercury
- Producer: Angelo; John Leventhal on "I Know"

Kim Richey chronology
| Kim Richey (1995) | Bitter Sweet (1997) | Glimmer (1999) |

Bitter Sweet is the second album by the American musician Kim Richey, released in 1997.

The album peaked at No. 53 on Billboard's Top Country Albums chart. Richey supported Bitter Sweet by playing shows with Junior Brown, Robert Earl Keen, and Wilco, among others.

== Production ==
The album was produced by Angelo and John Leventhal, who also cowrote some of the songs. Richey either wrote or cowrote all of its songs.

Bitter Sweet was recorded with Richey's touring band as the backing musicians. Kenny Vaughan played guitar on the album; Sam Bush played mandolin. "I'm Alright" employs accordion, mandolin, and banjo. John Crooke duetted with Richey on "Fallin'".

== Critical reception ==
Professional ratings
Review scores
| Source | Rating |
|---|---|
| AllMusic | 4.5/5 stars |
| Chicago Tribune | 3/4 stars |
| The Encyclopedia of Popular Music | 3/5 stars |
| Lincoln Journal Star | 5/5 stars |
| Los Angeles Daily News | 4/4 stars |
| MusicHound Rock: The Essential Album Guide | 4/5 stars |
| The Republican | 4/5 stars |
| Spin | 8/10 |

The Chicago Reader wrote that "a few tunes suggest the mid-70s turquoise and denim of Linda Ronstadt, but there are also a number of gritty, loose songs." Spin determined that the "best tracks tastefully tangle alternative country's string band purity and mainstream country's gloss." The Chicago Tribune thought that Richey's band "plays with the rapport of the Jayhawks and the Band before them, laying barbed-wire guitar leads and earthy harmonies over acoustic strumming and rough-and-tumble rhythms."

Stereo Review stated that Richey "cuts through country's plastic heart to usher in the genre's new realism." The Los Angeles Daily News called the album "excellent," and praised the "terrific vocals and top-notch country-rock musicianship." The Lincoln Journal Star concluded that Richey "cements her growing reputation as the rare artist who manages to appeal to both Nashville's most hidebound factions and its alternative-minded strains."

The Dayton Daily News deemed Bitter Sweet the best album of 1997; the Nashville Banner and The Province listed it among the year's best country albums.

AllMusic wrote that "Richey is a fine lyricist, capable of taking a cliché and twisting it or reinvesting everyday language with meaning."

== Track listing ==
| No. | Title | Writer(s) | Length |
|---|---|---|---|
| 1. | "Every River" | Angelo Petraglia, Tom Littlefield, Kim Richey | 4:00 |
| 2. | "I'm Alright" | Petraglia, Larry Gottlieb, Richey | 4:01 |
| 3. | "Wildest Dreams" | Petraglia, Richey | 4:33 |
| 4. | "Straight as the Crow Flies" | Petraglia, Richey | 4:20 |
| 5. | "I Know" | John Leventhal, Richey | 3:13 |
| 6. | "Fallin'" | John Crooke, Richey | 4:33 |
| 7. | "To Tell the Truth" | Petraglia, Gottlieb, Richey | 3:28 |
| 8. | "My Whole World" | Tia Sillers, Richey | 4:25 |
| 9. | "The Lonesome Side of Town" | Petraglia, Gottlieb, Richey | 3:58 |
| 10. | "Don't Let Me Down Easy" | Petraglia, Littlefield, Richey | 4:21 |
| 11. | "Let It Roll" | Petraglia, Richey | 4:35 |
| 12. | "Why Can't I Say Goodnight" | Petraglia, Richey | 3:11 |
