= Easier Said Than Done (Radney Foster song) =

Single by Radney Foster

from the album Del Rio, TX 1959
- B-side: "Don't Say Goodbye"
- Released: June 7, 1993
- Genre: Country
- Length: 3:39
- Label: Arista
- Songwriter: Radney Foster
- Producers: Steve Fishell, Radney Foster

Radney Foster singles chronology
"Nobody Wins" (1993)	"Easier Said Than Done" (1993)	"Hammer and Nails" (1993)

"Easier Said Than Done" is a song written and recorded by American country music artist Radney Foster. It was released in June 1993 as the third single from the album Del Rio, TX 1959. The song reached number 20 on the Billboard Hot Country Singles & Tracks chart.

== Content ==
The song is a ballad where the narrator talks about his broken relationship with his former partner.

== Music video ==
The music video was directed by Deaton Flanigen and premiered in mid-1993.

== Chart performance ==
"Easier Said Than Done" debuted at number 72 on the U.S. Billboard Hot Country Singles & Tracks for the week of June 12, 1993.

Chart (1993)	Peak position
Canada Country Singles (RPM)	28
US Hot Country Songs (Billboard)	20
