= Labor of Love (Radney Foster album) =

Studio album by Radney Foster
- Released: April 11, 1995
- Recorded: 1994–1995; Woodland Studios, Nashville, TN, Imagine Studios, Champagne, The Castle & Recording Arts Studios
- Genre: Country
- Length: 46:30
- Label: Arista Nashville
- Producer: Steve Fishell, Radney Foster

Radney Foster chronology
Del Rio, TX 1959 (1992)	Labor of Love (1995)	See What You Want to See (1999)

Professional ratings
Review scores
Source	Rating
Daily Herald	3.5/4 stars

Labor of Love is the second studio album by American country music artist Radney Foster. It was released in 1995 on Arista Records, peaking at #61 on the Billboard Top Country Albums charts and producing three chart singles. It was also his final release for Arista Nashville, although his third album — 1999's See What You Want to See — was issued on Arista Austin.

== History ==
Initially, the album was to have been released in 1994 under the title Never Say Die. However, after lead-off single "Labor of Love" failed to reach Top 40, the album was delayed twice so that it would not interfere with Foster's contribution to a Merle Haggard tribute album. "Willin' to Walk" was issued as the second single in 1995, with its radio edit having been remixed by Steve Ripley of the Tractors. Closing out the album was "If It Were Me". These three singles peaked at #58, #54 and #59, respectively, on the Billboard country charts.

== Track listing ==
1. "Willin' to Walk" (Radney Foster) – 2:39
2. "Labor of Love" (Foster, Cindy Bullens) – 3:38
3. "My Whole Wide World" (Foster, Bullens) – 4:31
4. "Never Say Die" (Foster, George Ducas) – 4:08
5. "Jesse's Soul" (Foster, Tim DuBois) – 4:40
6. "Everybody Gets the Blues" (Foster, Ducas) – 3:04
7. "If It Were Me" (Foster, Kim Richey) – 4:40
8. "Broke Down" (Foster, Gary Nicholson) – 3:24
9. "Precious Pearl" (Foster) – 4:13
10. "Last Chance for Love" (Foster) – 4:05
11. "Walkin' Talkin' Woman" (Foster) – 2:37
12. "Making It Up as I Go" (Foster) – 4:35

== Personnel ==
=== Appearing On The Album ===
- Joan Besen – piano, clavinet, bells
- Sam Bush – fiddle
- Mary Chapin Carpenter – background vocals
- Joey Click – bass guitar
- Deryl Dodd – background vocals
- Dan Dugmore – acoustic guitar, pedal steel guitar
- Steve Fishell – pedal steel guitar, lap steel guitar
- Radney Foster – acoustic guitar, lead vocals, background vocals
- Bill Hullett – lead guitar, 12-string guitar
- Carl Jackson – background vocals
- Michael Joyce – bass guitar
- Albert Lee – lead guitar, mandolin
- Jimmy Maddox – Hammond B-3 organ
- Mike McAdam – lead guitar, electric guitar, acoustic guitar, 6-string bass guitar
- Bob Mummert – drums, percussion, timpani, castanets
- Lloyd Maines – pedal steel guitar
- Lee Roy Parnell – slide guitar
- Kim Richey – background vocals
- Harry Stinson – background vocals
- Pete Wasner – piano

=== Radney's Touring Band ===
- As Listed In Liner Notes
- Mike McAdam - guitars
- Jimmie Crawford: steel guitar
- Jimmy "Dusty Fingers" Maddox - piano, B-3 organ
- Joey Click - bass
- Bob Mummert - drums, percussion

== Production ==
- Produced By Steve Fishell For Jackalope Productions & Radney Foster
- Recorded By Mike Poole; Assisted By Ed Simonton
- Mixed By Chuck Ainlay; Assisted By Graham Lewis
- Digital Editing By Don Cobb
- Mastered By Denny Purcell

== Chart performance ==
Chart (1995)	Peak position
U.S. Billboard Top Country Albums	61
U.S. Billboard Top Heatseekers	36
