= Franne Golde =

American singer

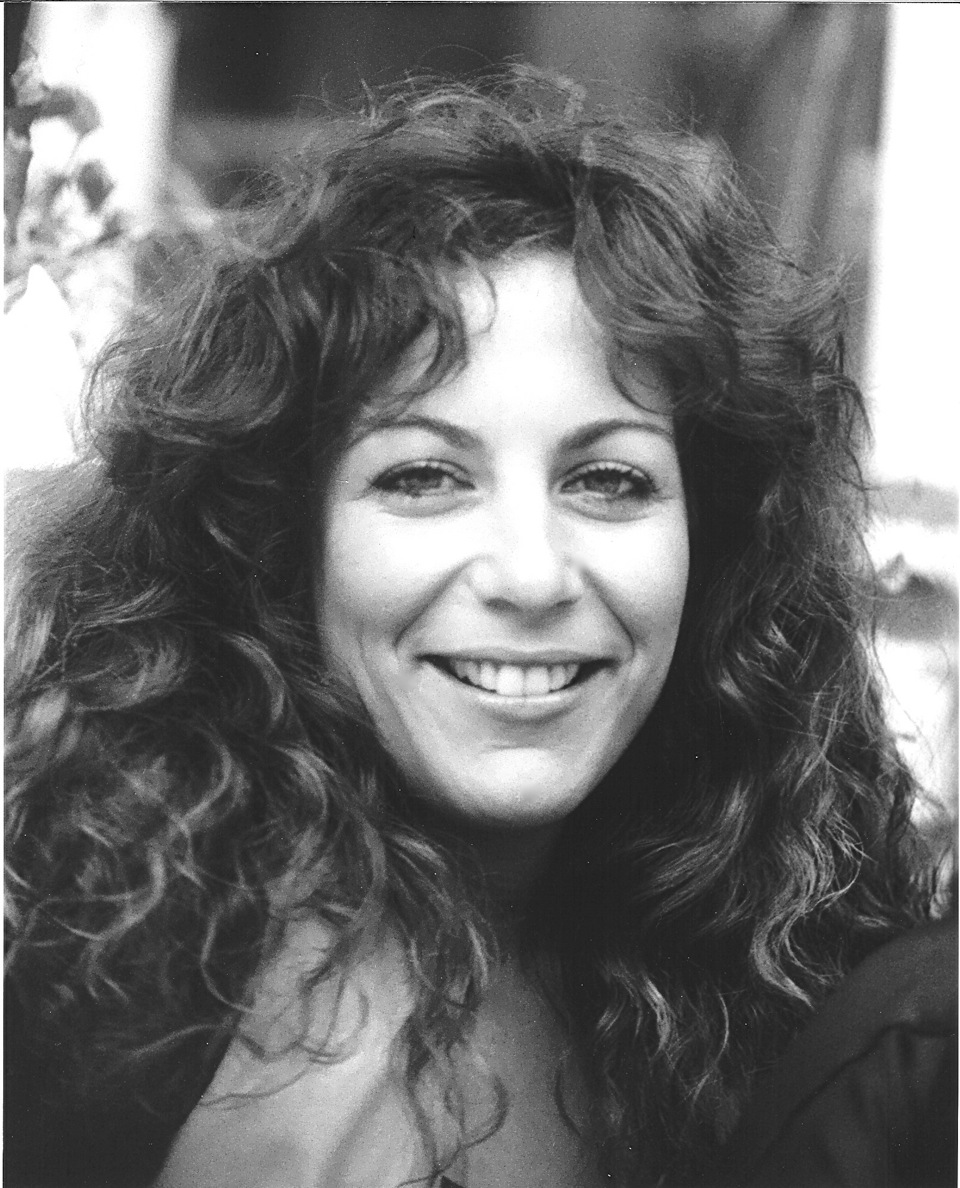
- Franne Golde on location, 1987

Background information
- Also known as: Franne Golde; Franne Fox
- Born: Francine Golde
- Origin: Chicago, Illinois, United States
- Genres: Pop, R&B, rock, country
- Occupations: Songwriter, singer, entrepreneur
- Instruments: Piano, keyboards
- Years active: 1972–present
- Labels: Atlantic, Portrait, Epic, Arista, EMI Latin. Motown, MCA, Columbia
- Website: http://www.frannegolde.com

Francine Golde, better known as Franne Golde or Frannie Golde, is an American songwriter, musician, singer and writer. Her songs have appeared on more than 100 million records sold worldwide. Golde has received BMI awards for singles with The Pussycat Dolls "Stickwitu", Randy Travis's "A Man Ain't Made of Stone", The Kinleys' "Somebody's Out There Watching" from the Touched by an Angel soundtrack, Selena's "Dreaming of You", Heart's "Secret", Jody Watley's "Don't You Want Me" and "Nightshift" by the Commodores, which also won a Grammy for Best R&B Performance by a Duo or Group and received a Grammy nomination for Song of the Year.

== Biography ==
=== Early career ===
Early in her career, Golde found a home away from home in a rented studio at the Chess Records in Chicago. Her teachers were the R&B artists, producers and songwriters who recorded there and took Golde under their wing. She soon formed her first band, Frannie, Zoey, with J.D., which received local acclaim, and she began recording for Atlantic and later Epic/Portrait.

In the early 1970s, Golde began writing with songwriter Carole Bayer Sager, who introduced her to Richard Perry. He was impressed with Golde, convinced her to move to Los Angeles, and signed her to his publishing company Braintree Music. Soon after, Diana Ross cut "Gettin' Ready for Love", the first song Golde co-wrote with Tom Snow, under her new deal with Perry. The top-10 international hit graced Ross' album Baby It's Me.

Golde also wrote the Dennis Edwards/Siedah Garrett duet "Don't Look Any Further" with Dennis Lambert and Duane Hitchings, which has since become one of the most frequently sampled tracks by rappers and dance artists internationally, including Snoop Dogg, TLC, Tupac Shakur, Junior M.A.F.I.A. with Notorious B.I.G., Lauryn Hill, and M People, who recorded the song and made it a hit for the fourth time in the UK. Saxophonist Dave Koz gave it a jazz interpretation on Lucky Man, and Michelin Tires used it for commercial advertising.

=== Album work ===
Golde's work has been featured on prominent soundtrack hits including the Grammy Award–winning The Bodyguard, as well as Top Gun, Beverly Hills Cop II, Selena, which featured Golde's hit single "Dreaming of You". Her music has also been used on the television series Miami Vice and Touched by an Angel, which included the country hit single "Somebody's Out There Watching".

Kenny G recorded Golde's "Even if My Heart Would Break" with Aaron Neville for The Bodyguard soundtrack. He then included it on his own release, Breathless. This marked only the third time in chart history that the same song appeared on both the No. 1 and No. 2 albums.

Golde has written songs on many albums, including Pussycat Dolls "Stickwitu", which was also a worldwide hit single and was nominated for a 2007 Grammy Award for Best Pop Performance by a Duo or Group; Jessica Simpson's "Be"; Christina Aguilera's "So Emotional" and her Grammy Award-winning Latin CD Mi Reflejo with "El Beso Del Final"; Jody Watley's "Don't You Want Me"; Whitney Houston's "I Belong to You"; the Commodores' "Nightshift". and Selena's "Dreaming of You".

In early November 2022, Bruce Springsteen recorded a cover of "Nightshift" on his Grammy Nominated - album Only the Strong Surivive. That same month, Golde was nominated for the Songwriter's Hall of Fame.

=== Current career ===
Golde is the founder and CEO of her the online clothing brand frannegolde.com.

She sits on the board of directors of Music Mends Minds, is a member of the Women's Alzheimer's Movement, and has been honored as an "Architect of Change" by Maria Shriver.

=== Personal life ===
Golde and record producer Paul Fox, who was diagnosed with early-onset Alzheimer's disease in 2013, were married in 1988. He died from Alzheimer's on December 25, 2022.

== Discography ==
=== Releases ===
- Frannie Golde (1976)
- Frannie (1979)
  - "Here I Go Fallin' In Love Again" / "Tell Me What's Goin' On" (1979)
- Restless (1980)

=== Production ===
- Club Paradise (Original Motion Picture Soundtrack), "Love People" (1986)
- Modern Girls (Original Motion Picture Soundtrack), "Girls Night Out" (1986)
- In This Skin (Jessica Simpson), "Everyday See You" and "Be" (2003)
