= Del Rio, TX 1959 =

Studio album by Radney Foster
- Released: September 29, 1992
- Recorded: 1992
- Studios: Treasure Isle and Champaign Studios, Nashville, TN
- Genre: Country
- Length: 39:19
- Label: Arista
- Producers: Steve Fishell; Radney Foster

Radney Foster chronology
Del Rio, TX 1959 (1992)	Labor of Love (1995)

Singles from Del Rio, TX 1959
- 1. "Just Call Me Lonesome" Released: July 20, 1992; 2. "Nobody Wins" Released: January 11, 1993; 3. "Easier Said Than Done" Released: June 7, 1993; 4. "Hammer and Nails" Released: October 19, 1993; 5. "Closing Time" Released: February 1994

Professional ratings
Review scores
Source	Rating
Allmusic	link
Dan DeLuca (Knight-Ridder Newspapers)	3/4 stars
Entertainment Weekly	C+ link

Del Rio, TX 1959 is the debut solo studio album by American country music artist Radney Foster. It was released in 1992 (see 1992 in country music) on the Arista Nashville label, and it produced five singles for Foster on the Billboard country charts: "Just Call Me Lonesome", "Nobody Wins", "Easier Said Than Done", "Hammer and Nails", and "Closing Time". All of these except "Closing Time" were Top 40 hits on the country charts; "Nobody Wins" was the highest-charting, reaching #2.

The album's title refers to Foster's birth year and birthplace.

== Track listing ==
All tracks are written by Radney Foster; co-writers as noted.

No.	Title	Writer(s)	Length
1.	"Just Call Me Lonesome"	George Ducas	3:09
2.	"Don't Say Goodbye"		3:30
3.	"Easier Said Than Done"		3:39
4.	"A Fine Line"		4:00
5.	"Went for a Ride"	Alice Randall	4:06
6.	"Nobody Wins"	Kim Richey	3:29
7.	"Louisiana Blue"	Beth Nielsen Chapman	3:23
8.	"Closing Time"	Mark Sager	3:38
9.	"Hammer and Nails"	Cidny Bullens	5:00
10.	"Old Silver"		5:25

== Personnel ==
The band

- Dan Dugmore – acoustic guitar
- Steve Fishell – pedal steel guitar, lap steel guitar
- Radney Foster – acoustic guitar, lead vocals, Prophet V on “Easier Said Than Done”
- Bill Hullett – electric guitar, acoustic guitar, 6-string bass, mandolin
- Michael Joyce – bass guitar
- Bob Mummert – drums, percussion, tire iron ("Hammer and Nails")
- John Propst – piano
- Pete Wasner – piano, Hammond B-3 organ

Additional musicians

- Glen Duncan – fiddle on "Louisiana Blue" and "Closing Time", viola on "Easier Said than Done"
- Albert Lee – lead guitar on "Don't Say Goodbye" and "Louisiana Blue"
- George Marinelli – lead guitar on "Hammer and Nails" and "A Fine Line"

On "Old Silver"

- Sam Bush – mandolin
- Lee Roy Parnell – National guitar
- Randy Scruggs – guitar
- Harry Stinson – drums
- Glenn Worf – upright bass

Backing vocalists

- Mary Chapin Carpenter – "Nobody Wins"
- John Hiatt – "Hammer and Nails"
- Carl Jackson – "Just Call Me Lonesome", "Louisiana Blue"
- Kim Richey – "Easier Said than Done", "A Fine Line", "Went for a Ride", "Closing Time", "Old Silver"
- Harry Stinson – "Don't Say Goodbye", "Old Silver"
- Cindy Williams – "Closing Time"
- Curtis Young – "A Fine Line", "Closing Time"

Technical

- Chuck Ainlay – mixing (all tracks except "Nobody Wins")
- Randy Best – mixing ("Nobody Wins")
- Steve Fishell – production
- Radney Foster – production
- Mike Poole – recording, mixing ("Old Silver" only)

== Chart performance ==
Chart (1992)	Peak position
U.S. Billboard Top Country Albums	46
U.S. Billboard Top Heatseekers	11
