= Kim Richey =

American singer-songwriter (born 1956)

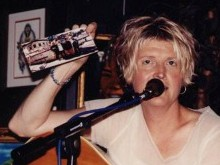
- Richey in 2002

Background information
- Born: Kimberly Kay Richey; December 1, 1956 (age 69); Zanesville, Ohio, U.S.
- Genres: Country, folk
- Occupations: Singer, songwriter
- Instruments: Vocals, guitar
- Years active: 1992–present
- Labels: Mercury Nashville, Lost Highway, Vanguard, Lojinx, Yep Roc

Kimberly Kay Richey (born December 1, 1956) is an American singer-songwriter and guitarist based in East Nashville, Tennessee.

== Early life ==
Kimberly Kay Richey was born in Zanesville, Ohio, on December 1, 1956. She grew up in Kettering, Ohio, graduating from Fairmont East High school in 1973.

== Career ==
Richey entered music in the 1990s, and secured her first recording contract with Mercury Nashville at the age of 37. She spent the next few years promoting her albums and touring with Wynonna Judd, John Prine, and others.

=== Compositions ===
Her songs have been recorded by Trisha Yearwood ("Believe Me Baby (I Lied)"), Radney Foster ("Nobody Wins"), and Brooks & Dunn ("Every River").

=== Recordings ===
Her May 1995 self-titled debut album was produced by Richard Bennett. It contained the singles "Just My Luck" and "Those Words We Said". Her follow-up album, Bitter Sweet, was produced by Angelo and released in 1997. It contained the single "I Know". Glimmer was released in 1999. Produced by Hugh Padgham (XTC), the album also features guitarist Dominic Miller (Sting). Rise was released in 2002 and was produced by Bill Bottrell. Her 2007 album Chinese Boxes was recorded in London and produced by Giles Martin. Wreck Your Wheels was released in 2010. It was produced by Neilson Hubbard in his studio. Released in 2013, Thorn in My Heart was again produced by Neilson Hubbard and features guest vocals from Trisha Yearwood. A limited-edition version of the album was released in 2014 as Thorn in My Heart: The Work Tapes with only Richey on guitar and vocals. Edgeland was released March 30, 2018, and produced by Brad Jones. Edgeland includes three different tracking bands of Nashville's roots players. Like Thorn in My Heart, Edgeland was released on Yep Roc Records.

== Discography ==
=== Albums ===
Title	Album details	Peak chart positions		
Title	Album details	US Country	US Heat	US Folk
Kim Richey	Release date: May 9, 1995; Label: Mercury Nashville	72	—	—
Bitter Sweet	Release date: March 4, 1997; Label: Mercury Nashville	53	—	—
Glimmer	Release date: August 3, 1999; Label: Mercury Nashville	—	—	—
Rise	Release date: October 1, 2002; Label: Lost Highway Records	—	—	—
The Collection	Release date: May 18, 2004; Label: Lost Highway Records	—	—	—
Chinese Boxes	Release date: July 10, 2007; Label: Vanguard Records	—	—	—
Wreck Your Wheels	Release date: September 14, 2010; Label: Thirty Tigers US, Lojinx (Europe)	—	—	—
Thorn in My Heart	Release date: April 16, 2013; Label: Yep Roc Records (US), Lojinx (Europe)	55	26	20
Edgeland	Release date: March 30, 2018; Label: Yep Roc Records	—	—	—
A Long Way Back: The Songs of Glimmer	Release date: March 27, 2020; Label: Yep Roc Records	—	—	—
Every New Beginning	Release date: May 24, 2024; Label: Yep Roc Records	—	—	—
"—" denotes releases that did not chart

=== EPs ===
- 2007: Little Record (Vanguard) - promo EP containing non-album acoustic versions of "Chinese Boxes", "Drift", "Straight as the Crow Flies", "Mexico" and "A Place Called Home"

=== Singles ===
Year	Single	Peak positions				Album
Year	Single	US Country	US AAA	CAN Country	CAN AC	Album
1995	"Just My Luck"	47	—	36	—	Kim Richey
1995	"Those Words We Said"	59	—	50	—	Kim Richey
1996	"From Where I Stand"	66	—	—	—	Kim Richey
1997	"I Know"	72	—	71	—	Bitter Sweet
1999	"Come Around"	—	13	—	64	Glimmer
2000	"The Way It Never Was"	—	—	—	—	Glimmer
2002	"The Circus Song (Can't Let Go)"	—	—	—	—	Rise
2007	"Jack and Jill"	—	—	—	—	Chinese Boxes
2013	"Come On"	—	—	—	—	Thorn in My Heart
2017	"The Get Together" (featuring Mando Saenz)	—	—	—	—	Edgeland
2018	"Whistle on Occasion" (featuring Chuck Prophet)	—	—	—	—	Edgeland
2018	"Not for Money or Love"	—	—	—	—	Edgeland
2018	"Chase Wild Horses"	—	—	—	—	Edgeland
2019	"Hello Old Friend"	—	—	—	—	A Long Way Back: The Songs of Glimmer
2020	"Come Around"	—	—	—	—	A Long Way Back: The Songs of Glimmer
2020	"Keep Me"	—	—	—	—	A Long Way Back: The Songs of Glimmer
2024	"Floating on the Surface"	—	—	—	—	Every New Beginning
2024	"Joy Rider"	—	—	—	—	Every New Beginning
2024	"Chapel Avenue"	—	—	—	—	Every New Beginning
2024	"A Way Around"	—	—	—	—	Every New Beginning
"—" denotes releases that did not chart

=== Music videos ===
Year	Video	Director
1995	"Just My Luck"	Dani Jacobs
1995	"Those Words We Said"	Pamela Springsteen
1997	"I Know"	Luke Scott
2000	"The Way It Never Was"	Jude Weng
2007	"Jack and Jill"	Stephanie B. Keane

=== Contributed vocals ===
- 1987: Bill Lloyd - Feeling the Elephant (East Side Digital)
- 1992: Radney Foster - Del Rio, TX 1959 (Arista)
- 1994: Bill Lloyd - Set to Pop (East Side Digital)
- 1994: George Ducas - George Ducas (Liberty)
- 1995: Radney Foster - Labor of Love (Arista)
- 1995: Reba McEntire - Starting Over (MCA)
- 1995: Rodney Crowell - Jewel of the South (MCA)
- 1995: Trisha Yearwood - Thinkin' About You (MCA)
- 1996: Jolene - Hell's Half Acre (Ardent)
- 1996: Keith Stegall - Passages (Mercury)
- 1996: Mary Chapin Carpenter - A Place in the World (Columbia)
- 1996: Tammy Rogers - Tammy Rogers (Dead Reckoning)
- 1996: Trisha Yearwood - Everybody Knows (MCA Nashville)
- 1996: Various Artists - Rig Rock Deluxe (A Musical Salute To The American Truck Driver) (Upstart Sounds)
- 1999: Jon Randall - Willin' (Eminent)
- 2000: Ryan Adams - Heartbreaker (Bloodshot)
- 2001: Brooks & Dunn - Steers & Stripes (Arista Nashville)
- 2001: Will Kimbrough - This (Gravity)
- 2002: Darden Smith - Sunflower (Dualtone)
- 2007: Honeyroot - The Sun Will Come (Just Music)
- 2012: Gretchen Peters - Hello Cruel World (Proper)
- 2014: Jason Isbell - Southeastern (Southeastern)
- 2015: Gretchen Peters - Blackbirds (Scarlet Letter)
- 2015: Dean Owens - Into The Sea (Drumfire)

=== Songwriting collaborations ===
Year	Artist	Song	Album	Collaborator
1992	Radney Foster	"Nobody Wins"	Del Rio, TX 1959	Radney Foster
1993	Dixie Chicks	"Desire"	Shouldn't a Told You That	Steve Kolander
1994	Steve Kolander	"Can't Undo What's Been Done"	Steve Kolander	Steve Kolander
1995	George Ducas	"In No Time at All"	George Ducas	George Ducas
1995	Radney Foster	"If It Were Me"	Labor of Love	Radney Foster
1995	Trisha Yearwood	"Those Words We Said"	Thinkin' About You	Angelo
1995	Trisha Yearwood	"Believe Me Baby (I Lied)"	Everybody Knows	Angelo & Larry Gottlieb
1997	Patty Loveless	"That's Exactly What I Mean"	Long Stretch of Lonesome	Tia Sillers
1997	Mindy McCready	"You'll Never Know"	If I Don't Stay the Night	Angelo
1998	Suzy Bogguss	"From Where I Stand"	Nobody Love, Nobody Gets Hurt	Tia Sillers
1998	Terri Clark	"I'm Alright"	How I Feel	Angelo & Larry Gottlieb
1999	Jim Lauderdale	"It's Just Like You"	Onward Through It All	Jim Lauderdale
1999	Mindy McCready	"Lucky Me"	I'm Not So Tough	Tommy Lee James & Jennifer Kimball
1999	Lorrie Morgan	"Here I Go Again"	My Heart	(sole writer)
2000	Terri Clark	"Last Thing I Wanted"	Fearless	Mary Chapin Carpenter
2000	Trisha Yearwood	"Where Are You Now"	Real Live Woman	Mary Chapin Carpenter
2001	Brooks & Dunn	"Every River"	Steers & Stripes	Angelo & Tom Littlefield
2001	Cyndi Thomson	"I'm Gone"	My World	Chuck Prophet
2007	The Greencards	"I Don't Want to Lose You"	Viridian	Mike Henderson
2007	The Greencards	"Travel On"	Viridian	Mike Henderson
