= Just Between You and Me (The Kinleys song) =

Single by The Kinleys

from the album Just Between You and Me
- Released: December 20, 1997
- Genre: Country
- Length: 3:34
- Label: Epic
- Songwriters: Heather Kinley; Jennifer Kinley; Russ Zavitson; Debbie Zavitson
- Producers: Russ Zavitson, Tony Haselden, Pete Greene

The Kinleys singles chronology
"Please" (1997)	"Just Between You and Me" (1997)	"Dance in the Boat" (1998)

"Just Between You and Me" is a song co-written and recorded by American country music duo The Kinleys. It was released in December 1997 as the second single and title track from the album Just Between You and Me. The song reached number 12 on the Billboard Hot Country Singles & Tracks chart. The song was written by Heather Kinley, Jennifer Kinley, Russ Zavitson, and Debbie Zavitson.

== Chart performance ==
Chart (1997–1998)	Peak position
Canada Country Singles (RPM)	9
US Bubbling Under Hot 100 (Billboard)	22
US Hot Country Songs (Billboard)	12

=== Year-end charts ===
Chart (1998)	Position
Canada Country Tracks (RPM)	85
US Country Songs (Billboard)	64
