= Georgia Middleman =

American country singer (born 1967)

- Birth name: Georgia Leigh Middleman
- Born: December 27, 1967 (age 57)
- Origin: Houston, Texas, U.S.
- Genres: Country; vocal jazz
- Occupation: Singer-songwriter
- Years active: 2000-present
- Labels: Giant; Middle Sister

Georgia Leigh Middleman (born December 27, 1967) is an American country singer. Middleman sang from age ten at the Texas Star Inn in San Antonio, and began writing songs shortly thereafter. She sold recordings of her first song, There's a Rainbow in Everybody's Heart, on her elementary school playground. In her teens, she opened in concert for Willie Nelson and Merle Haggard, and collaborated with Dick Wagner at age 17. After graduating from high school, she attended New York University on a theater scholarship, and worked on Off-Broadway shows and as a songwriter.

Following her schooling, she moved to Los Angeles in hopes of starting a career in acting, but by 1992 she had moved to Nashville to pursue music. She worked odd jobs and played locally before taking a job as a songwriter for Polygram Records in 1997. Soon after she was overheard by the president of Giant Records at a local show, who signed her. The label released her debut in 2001, after she had scored two country radio hits in the U.S..

Middleman also co-wrote Radney Foster's 1998 single "I'm In," which was later released as a single by The Kinleys in 2000 and Keith Urban in 2009. She also co-wrote Tracy Lawrence's 2004 single "It's All How You Look at It" and Sarah Buxton's 2006 debut single "Innocence."

Middleman is a member of Blue Sky Riders, a country music trio also featuring Kenny Loggins and Gary Burr, her husband. They released their debut album, Finally Home, on January 29, 2013.

Middleman also performs with Burr as the country duo Middleman Burr. The twosome released their first LP as a duo, I Like The Sound of That!, in January 2017.

== Discography ==
=== Albums ===
Title	Album details
Endless Possibilities	Release date: March 13, 2001; Label: Giant Records
Unchanged	Release date: May 4, 2004; Label: self-released
Things I Didn't Know I Knew	Release date: April 29, 2008; Label: Middle Sister Records

=== Singles ===
Year	Single	Peak positions	Album
Year	Single	US Country	Album
2000	"No Place Like Home"	53	Endless Possibilities
2000	"Kick Down the Door"	60	Endless Possibilities

=== Guest singles ===
Year	Single	Artist	Peak positions	Album
Year	Single	Artist	US Country	Album
2003	"Scary Old World"^{[A]}	Radney Foster	52	Another Way to Go

Notes

- A The radio edit of "Scary Old World" featured Georgia Middleman as a duet partner, while the version on Foster's Another Way to Go album features Chely Wright. This song was credited to "Radney Foster with Chely Wright or Georgia Middleman".

=== Music videos ===
Year	Video
2000	"Kick Down the Door"
