= Sherry Bryce =

- Born: Shirli Bryce; May 28, 1946
- Origin: Phil Campbell, Alabama, U.S.
- Died: May 26, 2025 (aged 78) Muscle Shoals, Alabama, U.S.
- Genres: Country
- Occupation: Singer
- Instrument: Vocals
- Years active: 1971–1977
- Labels: MGM/Curb

Shirli Bryce (May 28, 1946 – May 26, 2025), known professionally as Sherry Bryce, was an American country music artist.

Between 1971 and 1977, she charted fifteen times on the Billboard country singles charts, including seven duets with Mel Tillis. Their highest-charting duet was 1971's "Take My Hand" at No. 8. They were also nominated in 1974 at the Country Music Association awards for Duo of the Year. At the time, both she and Tillis were signed to MGM/Curb Records, and she recorded two duet albums with him. Bryce released six solo singles on the label and two solo albums but none of the singles reached higher than No. 45. Bryce also recorded briefly for MCA and Pilot Records in 1976 and 1977, owning the latter label with her husband, Mack Sanders.

Bryce retired from the music business and worked for many years in real estate in Florida. She was in declining health for several years and died in Muscle Shoals, Alabama on May 26, 2025, at the age of 78.

== Discography ==
=== Albums ===
Year	Title	US Country	Label
1971	Living and Learning (with Mel Tillis)	29	MGM
1973	Treat Me Like a Lady		MGM
1974	Let's Go All the Way Tonight (with Mel Tillis)	22	MGM
1975	This Song's for You		MGM

=== Singles ===
Year	Title	Chart Positions	Album
Year	Title	US Country	Album
1973	"Leaving's Heavy on My Mind"	64	Treat Me Like a Lady
1974	"Don't Stop Now"	45	Treat Me Like a Lady
1974	"Treat Me Like a Lady"	62	Treat Me Like a Lady
1974	"Oh, How Happy"	70	Treat Me Like a Lady
1975	"Love Song"	96	This Song's For You
1976	"Hang On Feelin'"	97	This Song's For You
1976	"Everything's Coming Up Love"	93	singles only
1977	"The Lady's Ain't for Sale"	79	singles only

=== Duets with Mel Tillis ===
Year	Title	Chart Positions			Album
Year	Title	US Country	US Bubbling	CAN Country	Album
1971	"Take My Hand"	8	10	15	Living and Learning
1971	"Living and Learning"	9	—	16	Living and Learning
1972	"Anything's Better Than Nothing"	38	—	—	Living and Learning
1973	"Let's Go All the Way Tonight"	26	—	63	Let's Go All the Way Tonight
1974	"Don't Let Go"	11	—	17	Let's Go All the Way Tonight
1975	"You Are the One"	14	—	46	Let's Go All the Way Tonight
1975	"Mr. Right and Mrs. Wrong"	32	—	—	Let's Go All the Way Tonight
