= Nobody Wins (Radney Foster song) =

Single by Radney Foster

from the album Del Rio, TX 1959
- B-side: "Don't Say Goodbye"
- Released: January 11, 1993
- Genre: Country
- Length: 3:30
- Label: Arista Nashville
- Songwriters: Radney Foster; Kim Richey
- Producers: Steve Fishell; Radney Foster

Radney Foster singles chronology
| "Just Call Me Lonesome" (1992) | "Nobody Wins" (1993) | "Easier Said Than Done" (1993) |

"Nobody Wins" is a song recorded by American country music artist Radney Foster, co-written by himself and Kim Richey. It was released in January 1993 as the second single from his debut album Del Rio, TX 1959. The song is the highest-peaking single of his career, spending 20 weeks on the Billboard Hot Country Singles & Tracks (now Hot Country Songs) charts and peaking at number 2, behind "The Heart Won't Lie" by Reba McEntire and Vince Gill. It also peaked at number 7 on the Canadian RPM country music charts in May 1993. Mary Chapin Carpenter sings background vocals on the song.

== Music video ==
The music video was directed by Sara Nichols and premiered in early 1993.

== Charts ==
"Nobody Wins" debuted at number 56 on the U.S. Billboard Hot Country Singles & Tracks for the week of January 23, 1993.

| Chart (1993) | Peak position |
|---|---|
| Canada Country Singles (RPM) | 7 |
| US Hot Country Songs (Billboard) | 2 |

=== Year-end charts ===
| Chart (1993) | Position |
|---|---|
| Canada Country Tracks (RPM) | 96 |
| US Country Songs (Billboard) | 29 |
