= Just Call Me Lonesome (Radney Foster song) =

Single by Radney Foster

from the album Del Rio, TX 1959
- B-side: "Louisiana Blue"
- Released: July 20, 1992
- Genre: Country
- Length: 3:09
- Label: Arista 12448
- Songwriters: Radney Foster; George Ducas
- Producers: Steve Fishell; Radney Foster

Radney Foster singles chronology
| "Just Call Me Lonesome" (1992) | "Nobody Wins" (1993) |

"Just Call Me Lonesome" is a song recorded by American country music artist Radney Foster. It was released in July 1992 as the lead single from his debut album Del Rio, TX 1959 and was co-written by Foster and George Ducas. It peaked at No. 10 on the Billboard country music chart in 1992 and was Foster's first release independently of the duo Foster & Lloyd.

== Critical reception ==
A review of the song in Cash Box was positive, stating that "Described as a classic shuffle in the tradition of Ray Price or Buck Owens, 'Just Call Me Lonesome' is also reminiscent of Dwight Yoakam's 'Guitars, Cadillacs'. Good Bakersfield sound."

A review by Billboard said all about Radney and his former part of the duo Foster & Lloyd.

== Chart performance ==
| Chart (1992) | Peak position |
|---|---|
| Canada Country Singles (RPM) | 54 |
| US Hot Country Songs (Billboard) | 10 |
