= Somebody's Out There Watching =

Single by The Kinleys

from the album Touched by an Angel: The Album
- Released: November 10, 1998
- Genre: Country
- Length: 3:50
- Label: Epic
- Songwriters: Steve Booker; Franne Golde; Robin Lerner
- Producers: Tony Haselden; Russ Zavitson

The Kinleys singles chronology
"You Make It Seem So Easy" (1998)	"Somebody's Out There Watching" (1998)	"My Heart Is Still Beating" (1999)

"Somebody's Out There Watching" is a song written by Steve Booker, Franne Golde and Robin Lerner, and recorded by American country music duo The Kinleys. It was released in November 1998 as the first single from Touched by an Angel: The Album. The song reached number 19 on the Billboard Hot Country Singles & Tracks chart, and became their biggest hit on the Billboard Hot 100, peaking at #64 in March 1999. The duo included the song as the last track of their second album II, released in 2000.

== Critical reception ==
Deborah Evans Price of Billboard gave the song a favorable review, writing that it has "a positive message, a nice country groove, and is a fine performance."

== Music video ==
The music video was directed by Jim Shea and premiered in November 1998.

== Chart performance ==
Chart (1998–1999)	Peak position
Canada Country Singles (RPM)	23
US Billboard Hot 100	64
US Hot Country Songs (Billboard)	19
