= I'm In =

1998 single by Radney Foster

Single by Radney Foster with Abra Moore

from the album See What You Want to See
- B-side: "I'm In" (cold intro)
- Released: 1998
- Genre: Country
- Length: 5:18 (album version); 4:18 (single version)
- Label: Arista Austin
- Songwriters: Radney Foster; Georgia Middleman
- Producer: Darrell Brown

Radney Foster singles chronology
| "If It Were Me" (1995) | "I'm In" (1998) | "Godspeed (Sweet Dreams)" (1999) |

"I'm In" is a song co-written and recorded by American country music singer Radney Foster. He recorded it on his 1999 studio album See What You Want to See, which was released on the Arista Austin label. In 2000, The Kinleys released it as a single from the album II, and ten years later, Keith Urban released his version as the fifth single from his album Defying Gravity. Urban's version of the song was a number two hit on the country music charts.

== Content ==
The song is about a male narrator who expresses his desire to commit with his lover, telling her that "If you need a lover and a friend / Baby, I'm in."

== Radney Foster version ==
Radney Foster wrote the song with Georgia Middleman, and recorded it as a duet with Abra Moore on his 1999 album See What You Want to See. This version was released as the first single from the album, and did not enter the charts. Two weeks before the slated release of the album, See What You Want to See was put on hold due to label restructuring.

=== Critical reception ===
Stephen Thomas Erlewine of Allmusic called "I'm In" one of "the best moments" on the album, saying that it "showcase[s] him at his best as a songwriter while successfully delivering a fresh, updated sound."

== The Kinleys version ==
"I'm In"

Single by The Kinleys

from the album II
- B-side: "I Need You Now"
- Released: October 3, 2000
- Genre: Country
- Length: 4:55 (album version); 3:37 (single version)
- Label: Epic Nashville 79496
- Songwriters: Radney Foster; Georgia Middleman
- Producer: Radney Foster

The Kinleys singles chronology
| "She Ain't the Girl for You" (2000) | "I'm In" (2000) | "Little Shoulders" (2004) |

In 1999, country music duo The Kinleys recorded a version of "I'm In" for the album II, released in 2000 via Epic Records. Foster co-produced The Kinleys' version of the song, and five other tracks on the album.

=== Critical reception ===
Country Standard Time critic Jeffrey B. Remz, in his review of II, said that The Kinleys' rendition was "radio friendly" and that the duo "strip[s]" the song "from its rootsy feel by going for a bigger, churning sound." Gene Harbrecht of the Orlando Sentinel called it a "hopeful counterpoint punctuated by soaring vocals."

=== Music video ===
The music video was directed by Eric Welch and premiered in late 2000.

=== Chart performance ===
The Kinleys' version debuted on the Billboard Hot Country Singles & Tracks (now Hot Country Songs) charts dated for the week ending October 28, 2000. It spent twenty-two weeks on that chart and peaked at 35. It was the third and final single from that album, and the last charting single for the duo.

| Chart (2000–2001) | Peak position |
|---|---|
| US Hot Country Songs (Billboard) | 35 |

== Keith Urban version ==
"I'm In"

Single by Keith Urban

from the album Defying Gravity
- Released: May 10, 2010
- Recorded: 2009
- Genre: Country
- Length: 4:33 (album version); 3:42 (radio edit)
- Label: Capitol Nashville
- Songwriters: Radney Foster; Georgia Middleman
- Producers: Dann Huff; Keith Urban

Keith Urban singles chronology
| "'Til Summer Comes Around" (2009) | "I'm In" (2010) | "Put You in a Song" (2010) |

Keith Urban recorded the song for his 2009 album Defying Gravity. In a radio interview, Urban told KILT-FM that his rendition would be the fifth single from the album, and that he would perform it at the Academy of Country Music awards show on April 18, 2010. This is the second track from Foster's album See What You Want to See that Urban has covered; he had previously recorded "Raining on Sunday" (which follows "I'm In" on that album) and released his version of that song in 2003 from his 2002 album Golden Road. It is also Urban's first American single that does not have a music video for it.

=== Composition ===
Urban's rendition of the song is set in the key of F major and has a main chord pattern of F-C-Gm^{7}-B♭sus^{2} and a moderately fast tempo as well as a vocal range of C_{3}-A_{4}.

=== Critical reception ===
Sam Gazdziak of Engine 145 gave Urban's rendition a "thumbs-up", saying that it was "not as good as the original" but "a good introduction to the song." His review criticized the guitar solo, which he thought was "out of place". Slant Magazine's Jonathan Keefe also considered it inferior to The Kinleys' version, saying that Urban's version was "tepid." Allmusic critic Thom Jurek compared the sound of Urban's version to that of The Rolling Stones, saying that it would be an "excellent choice for a single". Kevin John Coyne from Country Universe gave the song a B− grade and stated that Keith Urban "makes everything sound so effortless that it can be easy to overlook songs that legitimately could have used more effort" though "if he’s going to use outside material, he should be more selective than he was this time around."

=== Chart performance ===
| Chart (2010) | Peak position |
|---|---|
| Canada Country (Billboard) | 1 |
| Canada Hot 100 (Billboard) | 63 |
| US Billboard Hot 100 | 60 |
| US Hot Country Songs (Billboard) | 2 |

=== Year-end charts ===
| Chart (2010) | Position |
|---|---|
| US Country Songs (Billboard) | 21 |
