= Touched by an Angel: The Album =

1998 soundtrack album by various artists

Soundtrack album by Various artists
- Released: November 3, 1998
- Genres: Christian, country, Adult contemporary
- Label: 550 Music
- Producers: Eric Bazilian; Deana Carter; Barry Eastman; Fred Hammond; Tony Haselden; Mark Heimermann; Richie Jones; David Kahne; Larry Klein; Daniel Lanois; Phil Madeira; Martina McBride; Kevin Shirley; Tommy Sims; Keith Thomas; Ric Wake; Kenny White; Paul Worley; Russ Zavitson

Professional ratings
Review scores
Source	Rating
Allmusic	2/5 stars

Touched by an Angel: The Album is the soundtrack to the TV series Touched by an Angel. It was released on November 3, 1998, by 550 Music. The album peaked at number 1 on the Billboard Top Christian Albums chart, number 3 on the Top Country Albums chart and number 16 on the all-genre Billboard 200. "Somebody's Out There Watching" by The Kinleys was released as a single, reaching number 19 on Hot Country Songs. "Colour Everywhere" by Deana Carter also appeared on her 1999 album Everything's Gonna Be Alright. "Testify to Love" was performed by Wynonna Judd as the character Audrey on the show's 100th episode.

== Track listing ==
No.	Title	Writer(s)	Performer(s)	Length
1.	"Walk with You"	Marc Lichtman, Martha Williamson	Della Reese with The Verity All-Stars	3:23
2.	"Love Can Move Mountains"	Diane Warren	Celine Dion with God's Property	5:06
3.	"You Were Loved"	Warren	Wynonna	4:09
4.	"Somebody's Out There Watching"	Steve Booker, Franne Golde, Robin Lerner	The Kinleys	3:50
5.	"Colour Everywhere"	Shelly Peiken, Guy Roche	Deana Carter	4:18
6.	"Dignity"	Bob Dylan	Bob Dylan	5:36
7.	"Believe in You"	Eric Bazilian, Amanda Marshall	Amanda Marshall	5:04
8.	"I Don't Know Why"	Shawn Colvin	Shawn Colvin	4:38
9.	"Independence Day"	Jeff Franzel, Michelle Lewis	Imani Coppola	3:37
10.	"When I See You Smile"	Warren	Uncle Sam	4:51
11.	"Follow Me Up"	Phil Madeira, Tommy Sims	Keb' Mo'	5:16
12.	"Shine All Your Light"	Beth Nielsen Chapman, Kimmie Rhodes	Amy Grant	4:46
13.	"Little Bits of Lightning"	Booker, Lerner	Martina McBride	4:24
14.	"When You Cry"	Warren	Faith Hill	5:23
15.	"God Loves You"	Mark Heimermann, Wayne Kirkpatrick	Jaci Velasquez	3:36
16.	"Testify to Love"	Paul Field, Henk Pool, Robert Riekerk, Ralph Van Manen	Wynonna	3:09

== Charts ==
=== Weekly charts ===
Chart (1998)	Peak position
Canadian Albums (RPM)	27
Canadian Country Albums (RPM)	4
US Billboard 200	16
US Top Christian Albums (Billboard)	3
US Top Country Albums (Billboard)	3

=== Year-end charts ===
Chart (1999)	Position
US Billboard 200	116
US Top Country Albums (Billboard)	11
