= The Lynns =

American country music duo

- Origin: Hurricane Mills, Tennessee
- Genres: Country
- Years active: 1997–1999
- Label: Reprise
- Past members: Peggy Lynn (Marchetti); Patsy Lynn (Russell)

The Lynns were an American country music duo, consisting of twin sisters Peggy Lynn and Patsy Lynn (born August 6, 1964), who are the youngest daughters of Oliver Lynn and singer Loretta Lynn.

They recorded one album for Reprise Records, which charted two singles on Hot Country Songs. The Lynns have received CMA Award nominations for Vocal Duo of the Year in 1998 and 1999.

Their album was met with mixed reception. Peter Margasak of Chicago Reader wrote that "musically they don't show much more spunk. Their singing...is no match for their mother's, but they're certainly not alone there....most of the material is typical Nashville mush: weepy ballads and tame, predictable rockers." Jason Ankeny of AllMusic praised the duo's "powerful voices" but criticized the "formulaic production".

Patsy's daughter, Emmy Russell, auditioned for season 22 of American Idol.

== Discography ==
=== The Lynns ===
The Lynns

Studio album by The Lynns
- Released: 1998
- Genre: Country
- Label: Reprise
- Producer: Don Cook; Dale Dodson

Track listing

1. "Crazy World of Love" (Patsy Lynn, Peggy Lynn, Philip Russell) - 2:36
2. "Woman to Woman" (Patsy Lynn, Peggy Lynn, Russell) -3:32
3. "This Must Be Love" (Kostas, James House) - 2:23
4. "It Hurts" (Patsy Lynn, Peggy Lynn) - 4:08
5. "Cry Cry Baby" (Patsy Lynn, Peggy Lynn, James Lewis) - 3:03
6. "Nights Like These" (Patsy Lynn, Peggy Lynn) - 3:10
7. "Oh My Goodness" (Patsy Lynn, Peggy Lynn, Mitch Callis) - 3:29
8. "What Am I Doing Loving You" (Jamie O'Hara) - 2:47
9. "I Won't Leave This World Unloved" (Patsy Lynn, Jaime Kyle, Pat Bunch) - 3:08
10. "Someday" (Peggy Lynn, Patsy Lynn, Lewis) - 3:05

Musicians

From The Lynns liner notes.

- Dennis Burnside - piano, keyboards, Hammond B-3 organ
- Mark Casstevens - acoustic guitar
- Larry Franklin - fiddle
- James House - acoustic guitar
- David Hungate - bass guitar, acoustic bass guitar
- Lloyd Maines - steel guitar
- Pat McGrath - electric guitar
- Steve Nathan - piano, keyboards, Hammond B-3 organ
- Tony Paoletta - steel guitar, lap steel guitar
- Brent Rowan - electric guitar
- Bob Warren - percussion
- Biff Watson - acoustic guitar
- Lonnie Wilson - drums, percussion

Technical

- Mike Bradley - recording, mixing
- Don Cook - producer
- Dale Dodson - associate producer
- Ken Love - mastering
- Pat McMakin - recording
- Kenny Royster - vocal arrangement
- Hank Williams - mastering

=== Singles ===
Year	Single	Peak chart positions			Album
Year	Single	US Country	US Bubbling	CAN Country	Album
1997	"Nights Like These"	48	—	—	The Lynns
1998	"Woman to Woman"	43	11	45	The Lynns
1998	"What Am I Doing in Love"	—	—	—	The Lynns
"—" denotes releases that did not chart

=== Music videos ===
Year	Video	Director
1997	"Nights Like These"	Michael Merriman
1998	"Woman to Woman"	Steven Goldmann

== Awards and nominations ==
Year	Organization	Award	Nominee/Work	Result
1998	Academy of Country Music Awards	Top New Vocal Group or Duo	The Lynns	Nominated
1998	Country Music Association Awards	Vocal Duo of the Year	The Lynns	Nominated
1999	Country Music Association Awards	Vocal Duo of the Year	The Lynns	Nominated
