= Radney Foster =

American country singer-songwriter musician (born 1959)

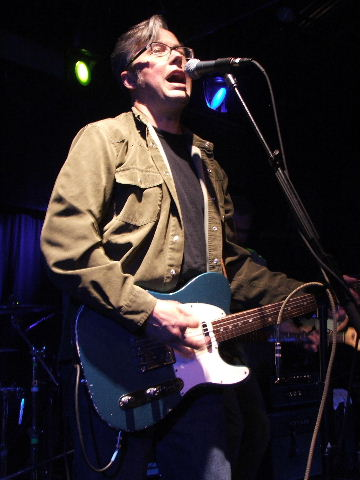
- Foster at South by Southwest in 2006

Background information
- Born: Radney Muckleroy Foster; July 20, 1959 (age 67); Del Rio, Texas, U.S.
- Genre: Country
- Occupation: Singer-songwriter
- Instruments: Vocals, guitar
- Years active: 1986–present
- Labels: Arista Nashville, Dualtone, Devil's River
- Formerly of: Foster & Lloyd
- Website: www.radneyfoster.com

Radney Muckleroy Foster (born July 20, 1959) is an American country music singer-songwriter, musician, and record producer. Initially a songwriter in Nashville, Tennessee, Foster made his recording debut as part of the Foster & Lloyd duo, recording three studio albums and with nine singles on the country charts.

Foster began his solo career in 1992 and his album Del Rio, TX 1959 produced four consecutive Top 40 hits. However, his commercial success waned with the release of subsequent albums such as Labor of Love (1995), See What You Want to See (1999), Are You Ready for the Big Show?, Another Way to Go (2002) and This World We Live In (2006). Overall, Foster has had thirteen songs on the Billboard Hot Country Songs charts, including the Top Ten hits "Just Call Me Lonesome" (#10, 1992) and "Nobody Wins" (#2, 1993). His songs have been recorded by Gary Allan, Sara Evans, Keith Urban, Hootie and the Blowfish, and Jack Ingram.

== Early life and education ==
Radney Foster was born in Del Rio, Texas, as the second of four children. His father was a lawyer who sang and played guitar and by age 12, Foster began playing the guitar as well, and by 14, he began writing songs.

After graduating from high school, Foster attended Sewanee: The University of the South in Sewanee, Tennessee, where he became a member of the Gamma Sigma chapter of Phi Gamma Delta. He dropped out in 1979 and at the advice of veteran songwriter Randy Goodrum, moved to Nashville to pursue a music career. Foster later returned to college at Sewanee and completed his degree, while performing at local venues in his spare time.

== Career ==
=== 1985 to 1990 ===
Foster moved to Nashville in 1985 and found work at MTM Publishing Company as a songwriter. There he met Bill Lloyd and they co-wrote the song "Since I Found You" which became a Top Ten hit for the Sweethearts of the Rodeo. In 1986 Foster formed the duo Foster & Lloyd and they received a recording contract with RCA Records Nashville. Between 1987 and 1990, they recorded three studio albums and had nine singles on the country charts. The highest-peaking of these was their debut single "Crazy Over You", a No. 4 hit in 1987. The two parted ways in 1990 to pursue solo careers. Later, in 1990, their song "Don't Go Out" was released by Tanya Tucker in 1990 as a duet with T. Graham Brown.

=== 1991 to 2000 ===
Two years later Foster signed with Arista Nashville and released the album Del Rio, TX 1959 (named for Foster's place and year of birth). The album produced two consecutive Top Ten hits: "Just Call Me Lonesome" and "Nobody Wins", which respectively reached No. 10 and No. 2 on the Billboard country charts. Two later singles, "Easier Said Than Done" and "Hammer and Nails", also reached Top 40, peaking at No. 20 and No. 34, respectively.

In 1994, Foster began work on his second album, which was originally to be titled Never Say Die. After the lead single "Labor of Love" failed to make the Top 40, Arista delayed the album's release so that it would not compete with the compilation album Mama's Hungry Eyes: A Tribute to Merle Haggard, to which Foster had contributed the track "The Running Kind". Steve Ripley, who recorded on Arista as lead singer of The Tractors at the time, remixed the following single "Willin' to Walk" and the album was released under the title Labor of Love in April 1995. Later that year, Foster contributed the song "Close Up the Honky Tonks" to the AIDS benefit album Red Hot + Country produced by the Red Hot Organization.

Foster's third album was 1999's See What You Want to See, featuring a more pop-oriented sound and backing vocals from Darius Rucker of Hootie & the Blowfish. The album produced a charting single in "Godspeed (Sweet Dreams)", a duet with Emmylou Harris which peaked at No. 74 on the country charts and was recorded by the Dixie Chicks in 2003. Two of the album's cuts were later covered by Keith Urban, who released his renditions as singles: "Raining on Sunday" from Golden Road, and "I'm In" from Defying Gravity. The latter was also a single for The Kinleys, whose version Foster produced, in 2000.

=== 2001 to 2011 ===
In 2001, Foster signed to Dualtone Records and released Are You Ready for the Big Show?, included the song "Texas in 1880", which Foster had originally recorded as a member of Foster & Lloyd. The new version featured Pat Green and peaked at No. 54 on the country charts. Foster's next album was 2002's Another Way to Go. One of its tracks, "A Real Fine Place to Start" (another collaboration with Ducas) became a No. 1 hit single for Sara Evans on her 2005 album Real Fine Place. Foster's released This World We Live In in 2006 but none of the songs made the country charts. In 2005, Foster released a website-only album titled And Then There's Me: The Back Porch Sessions containing 11 acoustic tracks. Foster produced two albums for the Randy Rogers Band: their 2006 album Just a Matter of Time and 2008's Randy Rogers Band.

Foster began his own music label called Devil's River. In September 2009 Foster released the album Revival under the band name "Radney Foster and the Confessions" and a feature-length DVD documentary on the making of the album. The 90-minute film was co-produced by Foster and his wife. Keith Urban recorded Foster's song "I'm In" for his 2009 album Defying Gravity and it became a No. 2 single.

In December 2010, Foster rejoined the Foster & Lloyd duo and they released the album "It's Already Tomorrow" in 2011.

Foster is the host of the music anthology series "Crossroads" on CMT.

=== 2017 ===
In early 2017, Foster starred in Troubadour, a country musical by Sugarland member Kristian Bush and playwright Janece Shaffer. The production took place in Atlanta, at the Tony Award-winning Alliance Theatre. Foster also appears in the 2017 film Beauty Mark.

In September 2017, Foster released For You To See The Stars, a CD/book duo. The collection of short stories is his first print publication and follows the stories on the CD, which included nine new songs and a special re-recording of "Raining on Sunday", Foster's single that was later recorded by Keith Urban for his album Golden Road.

Foster contributed to For You To See The Stars as both a singer-songwriter and a writer of prose. The book and CD exhibit insight into the specifics of Foster's storytelling. Tennessean journalist Peter Cooper commented, “Radney Foster writes with uncommon depth of emotion, humor, empathy, and clarity. I’m going to ask him how he does it, and if he tells me I’ll let you in on his secret. Until then, it’s best that we read, wonder, and revel.”

== Personal life ==
A native of Del Rio, Texas, Foster moved to Tennessee to attend the University of the South at Sewanee. He lives in Nashville with his wife Cyndi and three children, Julien, Jackson, and Mojo.

== Discography ==
=== Albums ===
Title	Album details	Peak chart positions		
Title	Album details	US Country	US Heat	US Indie
Del Rio, TX 1959	Release date: September 29, 1992; Label: Arista Nashville	46	11	—
Labor of Love	Release date: April 11, 1995; Label: Arista Nashville	61	36	—
See What You Want to See	Release date: May 18, 1999; Label: Arista Austin	—	—	—
Are You Ready for the Big Show?	Release date: June 26, 2001; Label: Dualtone Records	—	—	—
Another Way to Go	Release date: September 10, 2002; Label: Dualtone Records	39	—	—
And Then There's Me (The Back Porch Sessions)	Release date: 2005; Label: RadneyFoster.com	—	—	—
This World We Live In	Release date: April 4, 2006; Label: Dualtone Records	—	—	—
Revival	Release date: August 31, 2009; Label: Devil's River	51	26	—
Del Rio, TX Revisited: Unplugged & Lonesome	Release date: August 14, 2012; Label: Devil's River	—	—	—
Everything I Should Have Said	Release date: May 13, 2014; Label: Devil's River	—	—	—
For You To See The Stars	Release date: September 15, 2017; Label: Devil's River	—	21	49
"—" denotes releases that did not chart

=== Extended plays ===
Title	Album details
The Chosen Few	Release date: August 31, 2009; Label: Devil's River

=== Singles ===
Year	Single	Peak chart positions		Album
Year	Single	US Country	CAN Country	Album
1992	"Just Call Me Lonesome"	10	54	Del Rio, TX 1959
1993	"Nobody Wins"	2	7	Del Rio, TX 1959
1993	"Easier Said Than Done"	20	28	Del Rio, TX 1959
1993	"Hammer and Nails"	34	54	Del Rio, TX 1959
1994	"Closing Time"	59	70	Del Rio, TX 1959
1994	"Labor of Love"	58	—	Never Say Die (unreleased)
1994	"The Running Kind"	64	—	Mama's Hungry Eyes: A Tribute to Merle Haggard
1995	"Willin' to Walk"	54	92	Labor of Love
1995	"If It Were Me"	59	89	Labor of Love
1998	"I'm In" (with Abra Moore)	—	—	See What You Want to See
1999	"Godspeed (Sweet Dreams)"	74	—	See What You Want to See
2001	"Texas in 1880" (with Pat Green)	54	—	Are You Ready for the Big Show?
2002	"Everyday Angel"	43	—	Another Way to Go
2003	"Scary Old World" (with Chely Wright)	52	—	Another Way to Go
2005	"Half of My Mistakes"	—	—	This World We Live In
2006	"Prove Me Right"	—	—	This World We Live In
2009	A Little "Revival"	—	—	Revival
2009	"Angel Flight"	—	—	Revival
"—" denotes releases that did not chart

=== Guest singles ===
Year	Single	Artist	Album
1994	"Amazing Grace"	The Maverick Choir	Maverick (soundtrack)

=== Music videos ===
Year	Video	Director
1992	"Just Call Me Lonesome"	Jim Shea
1993	"Nobody Wins"	Sara Nichols
1993	"Easier Said Than Done"	Deaton Flanigen
1994	"Closing Time"	Jim Shea
1994	"Labor of Love"	Jim Shea
1994	"Amazing Grace" (The Maverick Choir)	Gil Bettman
1994	"The Running Kind"	Steve Boyle
1995	"Willin' to Walk"	Jim Shea
2001	"Texas in 1880" (with Pat Green)	David McClister
2002	"Everyday Angel"	Jim Shea
2009	"Angel Flight"	Darren Cameron
2012	"Louisiana Blue"	Steve Boyle
2014	"Whose Heart You Wreck (Ode to the Muse)"	Steve Boyle
2014	"California"	Steve Boyle
2017	"All That I Require"	Cyndi Hoelzle

=== Other appearances ===
Year	Song	Album
2018	"I'd Come Back to Me"	King of the Road: A Tribute to Roger Miller
