= The Kinleys =

American country duo

- Promotional image of The Kinleys, c. 2000

Background information
- Origin: Philadelphia, Pennsylvania, U.S.
- Genres: Country
- Years active: 1997–2005
- Labels: Epic, Identical
- Past members: Heather Kinley; Jennifer Kinley

The Kinleys were an American country music duo composed of identical twin sisters Heather and Jennifer Kinley (born November 5, 1970). Between 1997 and 2000, they recorded two albums for Epic Records (1997's Just Between You and Me and 2000's II). The duo charted eight entries on the Billboard Hot Country Songs charts in this timespan, including the No. 7 "Please", their debut single. Another one of their songs, "Somebody's Out There Watching", was featured in the soundtrack to the television series Touched by an Angel. After departing their label in 2000 due to dissatisfaction with touring, the duo released one last album in 2004 before disbanding.

== Biography ==
Heather and Jennifer Kinley were born November 5, 1970, in Philadelphia, Pennsylvania. The two are identical twin sisters.

Having started out on Al Alberts' Showcase, a televised talent show from the Philadelphia area, the twins moved to Nashville at the age of 19. After five years of training and practicing, they caught the attention of talent scouts and were signed with Epic Records. Their debut album Just Between You and Me was issued in late 1997, producing a No. 7 hit on the Billboard country singles charts in its lead-off single "Please". This song was followed by the album's title track at No. 12, although the next two singles both fell short of Top 40. Just Between You and Me was certified gold by the Recording Industry Association of America. Its commercial success led to a tour with Clint Black and a radio programmers' showcase in Las Vegas, Nevada. In 1998, The Kinleys received the Academy of Country Music Award for Top New Vocal Group or Duo of the Year.

The duo also recorded the song "Somebody's Out There Watching", which was used on the TV soundtrack album for the show Touched by an Angel. Released as a single in 1998, it reached Top 20 on the country charts. In July 1999, they released the first single from their planned second album, "My Heart Is Still Beating". The single failed to make the Top 40 in the Country charts and the second, self-titled album, slated for an Autumn 1999 release, was put on hold by Epic, who decided to bring in Radney Foster to work with the duo in order to broaden their sound and gain stronger chart appeal. "My Heart Is Still Beating" was eventually not included on their second album.

The duo did not release another single until the Foster-produced "She Ain't the Girl for You", the first single from their second album, II. This album also produced a minor single in "I'm In", which peaked at number 35 on the country charts. Ten years later, Keith Urban released a cover of this song, which went to number 2. Half of II was produced by Tony Haselden and Russ Zavitson, with whom the duo worked on their first album, while singer-songwriter Radney Foster (who also co-wrote "I'm In") produced the other half.

After II, the Kinleys exited Epic's roster, as "neither enjoyed life on the road one bit" and both had wanted to start families. They self-released their third and final album, All in the Family, in 2004 before disbanding.

== Personal lives ==
Both sisters married in 2000, seven months apart: Heather to Mark Mendenhall, and Jennifer to Adam Hughes. Both sisters each have two sons, and Heather has a stepdaughter and stepson. As of 2013, Jennifer worked as a registered nurse in Nashville, and sang in a Nashville church whose music leader is former MCA Records artist Lionel Cartwright.

== Discography ==
=== Studio albums ===
Title	Album details	Peak chart positions				Certifications (sales threshold)
Title	Album details	US Country	US	US Heat	CAN Country	Certifications (sales threshold)
Just Between You and Me	Release date: September 23, 1997; Label: Epic Nashville	22	153	6	32	US: Gold
II	Release date: July 18, 2000; Label: Epic Nashville	18	177	10	—	
All in the Family	Release date: August 3, 2004; Label: Identical Records	—	—	—	—	
"—" denotes releases that did not chart

=== Singles ===
Year	Single	Peak chart positions			Album
Year	Single	US Country	US	CAN Country	Album
1997	"Please"	7	67	22	Just Between You and Me
1997	"Just Between You and Me"	12	— (Note: "Just Between You and Me" did not enter the US Billboard Hot 100, but peaked at number 22 on the Bubbling Under Hot 100 Singles chart.)	9	Just Between You and Me
1998	"Dance in the Boat"	49	—	84	Just Between You and Me
1998	"You Make It Seem So Easy"	48	—	44	Just Between You and Me
1998	"Somebody's Out There Watching"	19	64	23	Touched by an Angel: The Album
1999	"My Heart Is Still Beating"	63	—	—	—N/a
2000	"She Ain't the Girl for You"	34	—	48	II
2000	"I'm In"	35	—	x	II
2001	"You're Still Here"	—	—	x	II
2004	"Little Shoulders"	—	—	—	All in the Family
2005	"I Will"	—	—	—	All in the Family
"—" denotes releases that did not chart "x" denotes that no relevant chart existed

=== Music videos ===
Year	Video	Director
1997	"Please"	Chris Rogers
1997	"Just Between You and Me"	Thom Oliphant
1998	"Somebody's Out There Watching"	Jim Shea
1999	"My Heart Is Still Beating"	Jim Shea
2000	"She Ain't the Girl for You"	Adolfo Doring
2000	"I'm In"	Eric Welch
2005	"I Will"	Flick Wiltshire

== Awards and nominations ==
=== Grammy Awards ===
Year	Nominee / work	Award	Result
1998	"Please"	Best Country Performance by a Duo or Group with Vocal	Nominated

=== American Music Awards ===
Year	Nominee / work	Award	Result
1999	The Kinleys	Favorite Country New Artist	Nominated

=== TNN/Music City News Country Awards ===
Year	Nominee / work	Award	Result
1998	The Kinleys	Vocal Group or Duo of the Year	Nominated
1999	The Kinleys	Vocal Group or Duo of the Year	Nominated
1999	The Kinleys	Female Star of Tomorrow	Nominated

=== Academy of Country Music Awards ===
Year	Nominee / work	Award	Result
1998	The Kinleys	Top New Vocal Group or Duo	Won
2001	The Kinleys	Top Vocal Duo of the Year	Nominated
2002	The Kinleys	Top Vocal Duo of the Year	Nominated

=== Country Music Association Awards ===
Year	Nominee / work	Award	Result
1998	The Kinleys	Vocal Duo of the Year	Nominated
1999	The Kinleys	Vocal Duo of the Year	Nominated
2000	The Kinleys	Vocal Duo of the Year	Nominated
2001	The Kinleys	Vocal Duo of the Year	Nominated
