= Pat Green discography =

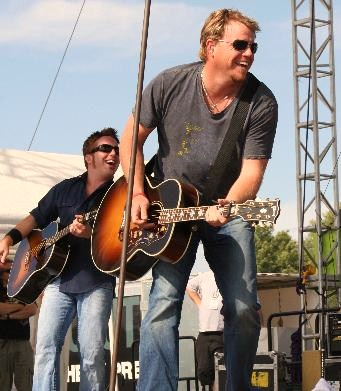
- Pat Green in 2008
- Studio albums: 12
- Live albums: 2
- Singles: 20
- Music videos: 10

American country music singer Pat Green has released twelve studio albums, two live albums, and twenty singles. After a number of independent releases in his home state of Texas, Green made his chart debut with "Texas on My Mind", a duet with Cory Morrow from their collaborative album Songs We Wish We'd Written. After this, he appeared on Radney Foster's "Texas in 1880", a song originally recorded by Foster in the duo Foster & Lloyd and appearing on Foster's album Are You Ready for the Big Show? Green's first solo single was 2001's "Carry On" from the 2001 album Three Days. Green would also record Wave on Wave and Lucky Ones for Universal before moving to the former BNA Records for Cannonball and What I'm For.

Green's most successful single is "Wave on Wave", which went to number three on the Billboard Hot Country Songs charts and thirty-nine on the Billboard Hot 100.

== Studio albums ==
Title	Album details	Peak chart positions			Sales	Certifications
Title	Album details	US Country	US	US Indie	Sales	Certifications
Dancehall Dreamer	Release Date: December 10, 1995; Label: Greenhorse Records, Inc.					
George's Bar	Release Date: June 15, 1997; Label: Greenhorse Records, Inc.					
Carry On	Release Date: February 22, 2000; Label: Universal Distribution					
Three Days	Release date: October 16, 2001; Label: Universal Records/Republic	7	86	—		
Wave on Wave	Release date: July 15, 2003; Label: Universal Records/Universal South Records	2	10	—		US: Gold
Lucky Ones	Release date: October 19, 2004; Label: Universal/Republic	6	28	—		
Cannonball	Release date: August 22, 2006; Label: BNA Records	2	20	—		
What I'm For	Release date: January 27, 2009; Label: BNA Records	2	18	—		
Songs We Wish We'd Written II	Release date: May 8, 2012; Label: Sugar Hill Records	15	59	8		
Home	Release date: August 14, 2015; Label: Greenhorse Music	5	49	3	US: 18,900	
Miles and Miles of You	Release date: September 2, 2022; Label: Empire/Pat Green Music	—	—	—		
"—" denotes releases that did not chart

== Live albums ==
Title	Album details
Here We Go (Live)	Release date: June 15, 1998; Label: self-released
Live at Billy Bob's Texas	Release date: April 27, 1999; Label: Smith Music Group

== Collaborative albums ==
Title	Album details	Peak chart positions	
Title	Album details	US Country	US Indie
Songs We Wish We'd Written (with Cory Morrow)	Release date: March 6, 2001; Label: Write On	26	13

== Singles ==
Year	Single	Peak chart positions		Album
Year	Single	US Country	US	Album
2001	"Texas On My Mind" (with Cory Morrow)	60	—	Songs We Wish We'd Written
2001	"Carry On"	35	—	Three Days
2002	"Three Days"	36	—	Three Days
2003	"Wave on Wave"	3	39	Wave on Wave
2004	"Guy Like Me"	31	—	Wave on Wave
2004	"Don't Break My Heart Again"	21	—	Lucky Ones
2005	"Somewhere Between Texas and Mexico"	42	—	Lucky Ones
2005	"Baby Doll"	21	—	Lucky Ones
2006	"Feels Just Like It Should"	13	80	Cannonball
2007	"Dixie Lullaby"	24	—	Cannonball
2007	"Way Back Texas"^{[A]}	28	—	Cannonball
2008	"Let Me"	12	81	What I'm For
2009	"Country Star"	32	—	What I'm For
2009	"What I'm For"	28	—	What I'm For
2012	"All Just to Get to You"	57	—	Songs We Wish We'd Written II
2012	"Austin"	—	—	Songs We Wish We'd Written II
2012	"Even the Losers"	—	—	Songs We Wish We'd Written II
2014	"Girls from Texas" (with Lyle Lovett)	—	—	Home
2016	"Day One"	—	—	Home
2017	"Drinkin' Days"	—	—	—N/a
"—" denotes releases that did not chart

== Other charted songs ==
All songs charted from unsolicited airplay on the country chart.

Year	Single	Peak chart positions	Album
Year	Single	US Country	Album
2003	"Winter Wonderland"	43	A Very Special Acoustic Christmas
2006	"Way Back Texas"^{[A]}	48	Cannonball

Note

- A "Way Back Texas" originally charted in 2006 from unsolicited airplay that brought it to No. 48 before its release. It was officially released as a single in 2007.

== Guest singles ==
Year	Single	Artist	Peak chart positions	Album
Year	Single	Artist	US Country	Album
2001	"Texas in 1880"	Radney Foster	54	Are You Ready for the Big Show?
2011	"My Texas"	Josh Abbott Band	—	Small Town Family Dream
"—" denotes releases that did not chart

== Music videos ==
Year	Video	Director
2001	"Carry On"	Thom Oliphant
2001	"Texas In 1880" (with Radney Foster)	David McClister
2002	"Three Days"	Thom Oliphant
2003	"Wave on Wave"	Roger Pistole
2004	"Don't Break My Heart Again"	David Hogan
2005	"Baby Doll"	Tom Campbell
2006	"Feels Just Like It Should"	Trey Fanjoy
2006	"Dixie Lullaby"	Trey Fanjoy
2012	"All Just to Get to You"	
2015	"While I Was Away"	Jeff Ray
