= Tommy Alverson =

Texas country musician (1954–2025)

- Born: Tommy Lanier Alverson; 10 June 1952; Itasca, Texas
- Died: 14 November 2024 (aged 72); Fort Worth
- Occupations: Musician; songwriter

Tommy Alverson (June 10, 1952 – November 14, 2024) was an American Texas Country musician born in Itasca, Texas. He grew up mostly in Stephenville, Texas and later relocated to Fort Worth, Texas as his career progressed. Alverson has shared the stage with Texas musicians Willie Nelson, Johnny Bush, Johnny Gimble, Jerry Jeff Walker, Clay Blaker, Gary P. Nunn, Ray Wylie Hubbard, Radney Foster, and Steven Fromholz, as well as Robert Earl Keen, Pat Green, Charlie Robison, Dale Watson, and singer/songwriter Jim Lauderdale. Alverson is also credited with the founding of Alverson's Texas Music Family Gathering and the cowriting of his book, “My Way or The Highway” with author Randall Callison.

== Biography ==
Alverson was born in Itasca, Texas, on June 10, 1952. He attended and played varsity football at Itasca High School with Austin's Sam Baker (then known as Dick Baker). During junior college, he began playing guitar with James Hand, and later produced Hand's first album. After college, He was married to Amy Alverson, and had several children. Amy was a large contributor to his career, helping with management and booking.

His original bandmates were son Justin Alverson on lead guitar, Ray Austin on steel and Dobro, Ron Thompson on drums, Jerry Abrams on bass, and Thurston Selby and Heather Woodruff on fiddle. His later traveling band consisted of Ray Austin playing pedal steel, Eric Holmes on drums, Justin Lightfoot on bass and vocals, Thurston Selby on fiddle and vocals, and Justin Alverson on guitar and vocals.

Alverson recorded a total of eight albums, some being studio and also a few live compilations. This discography included Texasongs (1995), a compilation of his first two cassette releases, From The Heart Of Hill County and Always In My Heart. Four years later, Me On The Jukebox (1999) was released, containing his most streamed hit, “Una Mas Cerveza”, co-produced by Alverson and Lloyd Maines. Then Live at Ozona (2001), produced by Phil York. Alive and Pickin’ (2001) was a live compilation album produced by Smith Entertainment, which was recorded at the historic Chatauqua Auditorium in Waxahachie, Texas. In 2004 Alverson released Heroes and Friends (2004), which featured guest artists Gary P. Nunn, Rusty Wier, Mike Graham, Davin James, Mike Crow and Heather Morgan.

Between releases, Alverson and Wilkins co-produced the 2006 Palo Duro release, Luckenbach! Compadres! (The Songs of Luckenbach, Texas), a multi-artist celebration recorded live at Luckenbach, Texas. Alverson's fifth studio release, titled Country to the Bone (2007), was his debut on Palo Duro Records. Alverson self-released a second live album, Live Again (2009), which was recorded at Pearl's Dance Hall in Fort Worth, Texas by Patrick McGuire Recording. His next studio album was Texas One More Time (2010). His last album recorded, Pickin’ on Willie (2012) was a compilation and tribute album to friend Willie Nelson. It includes renditions of songs such as “I’m A Memory” and “Night Life”, which features Willlie himself on vocals and guitar. as well as originals such as “Watching Willie’s Hands”. Tommy went into depth during an interview with group Middlin’ Creative about the sentiment created within this album and how long it had taken him to reach completion.

As of 2025, Fort Worth Stockyards-based Smith Music Group subsidiary Smith Entertainment, who distributes CDs by Cooder Graw, Jason Boland, Cory Morrow and many others, has acquired the distribution rights to all Alverson's CDs.

Alverson died from liver cancer on November 14, 2024, at the age of 74.

== Discography ==
- Texasongs (1995)
- Me on the Jukebox (1999)
- Alive and Pickin' (2001)
- Live at Ozona Revisited (2003)
- Heroes and Friends (2004)
- Country to the Bone (2007)
- Live Again (2009)
- Texas One More Time (2010)
- Pickin' on Willie (2012)
