= Dixie Lullaby =

Dixie Lullaby may refer to:

- Dixie Lullaby (book), a 2004 book by Mark Kemp
- "Dixie Lullaby (song)", a song by Pat Green from the album Cannonball (2006)
- "Dixie Lullaby", a song by Leon Russell from the eponymous album (1970)

== See also ==
- Dixie Lullabies, an album by The Kentucky Headliners
- Lullaby (Dixie Chicks song)
