= Sam Baker (musician) =

American singer-songwriter

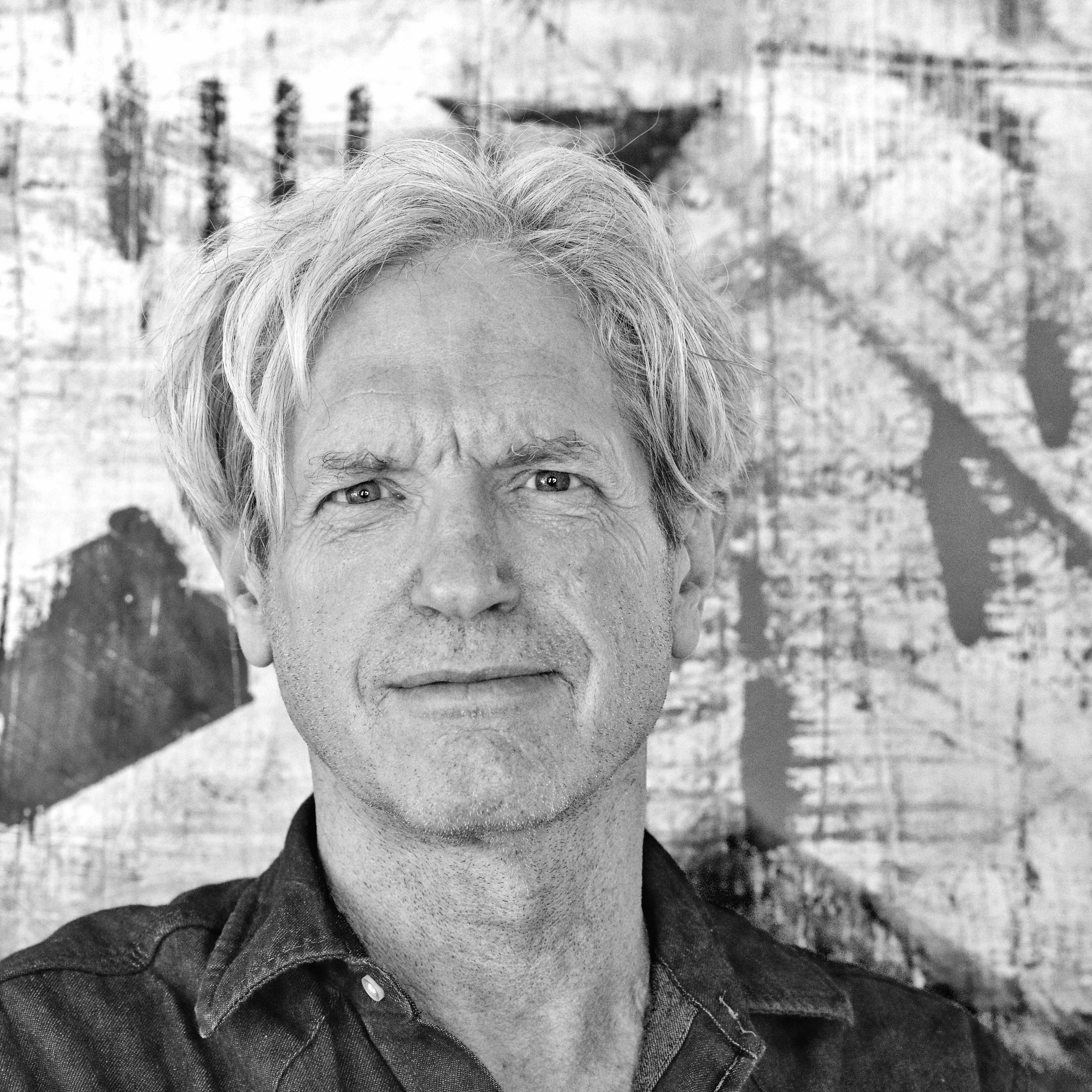

Background information
- Born: 1954 (age 70–71); Itasca, Texas
- Genres: Americana; Folk; Country
- Occupation: Singer-songwriter
- Instruments: Vocals, guitar
- Years active: 2004 –
- Website: sambakermusic.com

Sam Baker (born 1954) is an American folk musician based in Austin, Texas. He writes sparse poetic lyrics that have gained him acclaim from other notable folk artists such as Gurf Morlix and Fred Eaglesmith.

== Biography ==
Sam Baker was born in 1954 in Itasca, Texas. He attended Itasca High School, where he played varsity football with fellow musician Tommy Alverson. In 1986, Baker was traveling by train to Machu Picchu in Peru when a bomb placed on a luggage rack above his head by the Shining Path guerrilla group exploded, killing seven other passengers including the three people who had been sitting with him. Baker was left with numerous injuries, including brain damage, a cut artery, and blown-in eardrums. His injuries required 17 reconstructive surgeries. He has a constant case of tinnitus and the fingers of his left hand were left gnarled. He did retain enough dexterity to grasp a guitar pick and over time, re-taught himself to play his guitar left-handed. In a radio interview in 2020, Baker said his brain injury affected his use of language and he struggled to remember nouns. Writing helped him relearn. At the same time he was influenced by the music of Lightning Hopkins and his writing became songwriting as he discovered melody. Previous to the bombing, Baker had worked as a bank examiner and whitewater river guide.

== Music ==
Sam Baker's music has been compared to that of John Prine. Baker's 2013 album, Say Grace, was listed by Rolling Stone as one of the top 10 country music albums of 2013. In his review of Say Grace, Jim Fusilli wrote "In Mr. Baker's tales, the personal becomes universal through his keen-eyed writing, supported by well-chosen instrumentation and what might be called spoken-word melodies."

Among Baker's influences for his songwriting are Ken Kesey, William Faulkner, Ernest Hemingway, and Bob Dylan, and fellow Texans Lightnin' Hopkins, Guy Clark, and Townes Van Zandt.

== Painting ==
Sam Baker took up painting after he began songwriting.

== Discography ==
Year	Title	Record label
2024	Win Win	Self-release
2019	Horses and Stars (Live)	Self-release
2017	Land of Doubt	Self-release
2013	Say Grace	Self-release
2009	Cotton	Music Road Records
2007	Pretty World	Blue Lime Stone Records
2004	Mercy	Self-release
