= Conway School District (Arkansas) =

School district in Arkansas

Location
- 2220 Prince Street; Conway, Arkansas 72034 United States

District information
- Grades: PK–12
- Accreditation: Arkansas Department of Education
- Schools: 18
- NCES District ID: 0504590

Students and staff
- Students: 10,038 (2021-2022)
- Teachers: 628.09 (on FTE basis)(2021-2022)
- Staff: 524.17 (on FTE basis)(2021-2022)
- Student–teacher ratio: 15.98 (2021-2022)
- District mascot: Wampus Cat
- Colors: Royal Blue White

Other information
- Website: www.conwayschools.org

Conway School District (or Conway Public Schools) is a school district headquartered in Conway, Arkansas, United States. Conway Public Schools is located in Faulkner County and includes the majority of the Conway city limits as well as small pieces of Holland and Mayflower. With more than 10,000 students, Conway School District is the eighth largest in Arkansas. Starting August 20, 2012, the district will have 16 schools, including one high school, one junior high school, four middle schools, nine elementary schools and a preschool program.

Conway High School has experienced success in interscholastic sports and activities with conference and state titles. In 2010, the Wampus Cat football team took home the 7A conference championship. Also, winning the Arkansas State Championship in 2011 was baseball, wrestling and girls' soccer. Conway HS has a strong band program, with many students making all state band. In the 2011 War Memorial "Showcase of Bands" marching contest, the Wampus Cat there were also athletic scholarships in Ruth Doyle's name. Marching Band received the Brandon Award, the contest's highest award.

The Conway School District School Board was reported on in 2023 by ProPublica regarding several controversies, including violence surrounding meetings in fall 2022 where anti-trans and censorship policies were discussed and ultimately passed, and the jailing and sentencing of student protestors. The school board has attracted attention from local and national media outlets for FOIA violations, alleged racist and transphobic policies, and other ethical violations.

Picture of the Conway High School "Wampus Cat", a six-legged cat with "four to run with the speed of light and two to fight with all its might."

Wampus Cat

The Wampus Cat is a mythical creature that normally is portrayed as a cougar that can stand upright. This mascot is a variation of this with six arms. "Four to run at the speed of light and two to fight with all its might."

== Schools ==
High School: (10th - 12th grade)

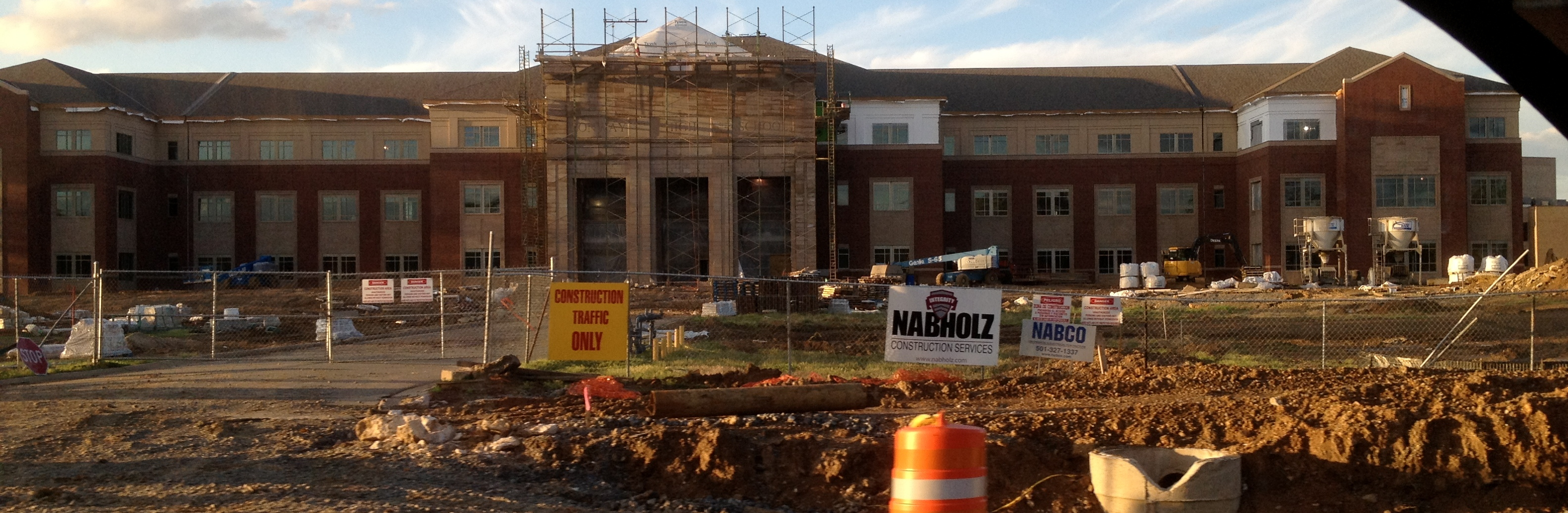
Construction of Conway High School

- Conway High School

Junior High School: (8th & 9th grades)

- Conway Junior High School

Middle Schools: (5th - 7th grades)

- Bob and Betty Courtway Middle School
- Carl Stuart Middle School
- Raymond and Phyllis Simon Middle School
- Ruth Doyle Middle School

Elementary Schools: (Kindergarten - 4th grade)

- Carolyn Lewis Elementary School
- Ellen Smith Elementary School
- Florence Mattison Elementary School
- Ida Burns Elementary School
- Jim Stone Elementary School
- Julia Lee Moore Elementary School
- Marguerite Vann Elementary School
- Theodore Jones Elementary School
- Woodrow Cummins Elementary School

In 2011, Jim Stone Elementary School received top honors from the U.S. Department of Education (ED) in being named a National Blue Ribbon School.

And then in 2013, Ellen Smith Elementary School also received top honors from the U.S. Department of Education (ED) in being named a National Blue Ribbon School.

Pre-School Center:

- Sallie Cone Pre-School Center

== Notable alumni ==
- Peyton Hillis - American football running back for the Denver Broncos, Cleveland Browns, Kansas City Chiefs, Tampa Bay Buccaneers, and New York Giants of the National Football League, from 2008–2014. He was also featured on the cover of the Madden NFL 12 video game.
- Greg Lasker - American football safety for the New York Giants, Chicago Bears, & Phoenix Cardinals of the National Football League, from 1986–1988. He was a member of the Giants Super Bowl XXI championship team.
- Marvin Delph - American basketball shooting guard for the Buffalo Braves of the NBA, 1978. Member of the famed "Triplets" at the University of Arkansas, along with Ron Brewer and Sidney Moncrief, who led the Razorbacks to the 1977, 1978, and 1979 Southwest Conference championship, and the NCAA Final Four in 1978. Delph also led Conway to back-to-back state championships in 1973 and 1974.
- Bryce Molder - professional golfer on the PGA Tour, from 2001–present. Won the 2006 Miccosukee Championship, and the 2011 Frys.com Open.
- Ernie Ruple - American football offensive tackle for the Pittsburgh Steelers of the National Football League, 1968. He was a freshman on the 1964 Arkansas Razorbacks football team that finished 11-0, and won the 1964 college football national championship. He was also named to the 1967 All-Southwest Conference football team.
