= Let Me =

Let Me may refer to:

- "Let Me" (Elvis Presley song), 1956
- "Let Me" (Paul Revere & the Raiders song), 1969
- "Let Me" (Pat Green song), 2008
- "Let Me" (Zayn song), 2018
- "Let Me", a 2014 song by Earshot
- "Let Me", a song by Rihanna from the 2005 album Music of the Sun
- "Let Me", a song by the Drums from the 2014 album Encyclopedia
- "Let Me", a song by Usher from the 2016 album Hard II Love
- "Let Me", a song by Got7 from the 2018 album Flight Log: Turbulence
