= Robbie Wills =

American politician (born 1968)

Member of the Arkansas House of Representatives from the 46th district
- In office 2001–2011

Speaker of the Arkansas House of Representatives
- In office 2009–2011
- Preceded by: Benny Petrus
- Succeeded by: Robert S. Moore, Jr.

Personal details
- Born: May 27, 1968 (age 58) Conway, Arkansas
- Party: Democratic
- Profession: attorney

Robert D. Wills, Jr. (born May 27, 1968) is an American attorney and former politician residing in Conway, Arkansas. He is the former Speaker of the House of the Arkansas House of Representatives and former State Representative representing House District 46 (as constituted from 2001 to 2011), which consisted of the western half of the City of Conway and a section of rural Western Faulkner County, Arkansas. Wills was sworn in as Speaker of the House of the 87th General Assembly on January 12, 2009. Wills was named to the Arkansas Business Power List in 2008 and the Arkansas Business 40 Under 40, also in 2008. Wills was elected as a Democrat. Wills was first elected in 2004 and was reelected without opposition in 2006 and 2008.

Wills was born on May 27, 1968, in Conway, Arkansas, and attended Conway Public Schools. His parents, Robert and Lou Jane Adams Wills are retired, long-time school teachers. As a child, Wills and his family lived at Pickles Gap Creek Crafts Village, a local tourist attraction two miles North of Conway founded by his grandparents, Jean "Momma Jean" Alley Adams and "Poppa" Wilburn C. Adams. Pickles Gap was known regionally as the "Home of the Do-Nothing," after a novelty item manufactured and sold at Pickles Gap. The Wills family moved into Conway when Robbie was 10 years old.

After graduating Conway High School in 1986, Wills enrolled at the University of Central Arkansas in Conway, receiving an ACT scholarship. After his freshman year, in the summer of 1987, Wills briefly relocated to Los Angeles, California with his band, the late 1980s hair-metal group "Crimson Tear," to pursue opportunities in the music business. The trip was ultimately unsuccessful and Wills returned home to Conway. Unfortunately, he returned too late to enroll in the fall semester at U.C.A. and therefore forfeited his scholarship. Wills has cited this as a turning point in his life, after which he applied himself to school and leadership. (Wills' early interest in music continued. He recorded and released several albums including Demonstration (1995); Tucker Creek (1998); The Very Best (And What's Left) of Robbie Wills (2002); 45 (2013); 47 (2017); 49 (2018); OBA: Songs From the Gulf Coast (2020); 54 (2023) and 56 (2024), all of which are available on major streaming platforms. Wills also tried his hand at stand-up comedy, performing at fraternity "Comedy Nights" and at a local comedy club ("Teleplex"), and for two years hosted a late-night comedy-variety show on local community-access cable television ("Conway After Hours," c. 1988 – 89). Wills was a founding member and local president of the Sigma Phi Epsilon fraternity at U.C.A. (Arkansas Zeta Chapter) and later worked as a regional director for the national office of Sig Ep, based in Richmond, Virginia.

Wills ran unsuccessfully for State Representative in 1998 against Republican Marvin Parks. (Wills and Parks subsequently became friends). In 2000, he ran unopposed for Justice of the Peace on the Faulkner County Quorum Court and was reelected in 2002.

Wills enrolled in the University of Arkansas at Little Rock Bowen School of Law in the fall of 2000. He graduated with a Juris Doctor in December 2003. Wills earned the top score on the February 2004 Arkansas Bar Exam. His law office is located in Conway, Arkansas.

In 2004, he ran again for State Representative against Dr John Smith, the former interim president of the University of Central Arkansas. Wills was elected with 53% of the vote. Wills served as Speaker of the House of Representatives during his third term in office during 2009-1010.

Wills ran unsuccessfully for US Congress after Vic Snyder announced his retirement in January 2010. Wills ran in a five-way Democratic primary in 2010 against fellow Democrats John Adams, David Boling, Patric Kennedy and Joyce Elliott. Wills was the only candidate from outside Pulaski County (the most populous county in the 2nd Congressional District). In spite of his visible position as Speaker of the House, Wills ran second in the initial balloting and faced a runoff with State Senator Joyce Elliott of Little Rock. The runoff was noted for its decidedly negative tone, with Wills attacking Elliott for her "extreme liberal" voting record as a state legislator and Elliott and her surrogates implying that Wills was racist for suggesting that Elliott would not fare well in the General Election (Elliott is an African-American female). Many liberal voters rejected Wills as too conservative due to his resistance to the early drafts of the Patient Protection and Affordable Care Act ("Obamacare"). This was in spite of his distinguished record in health care policy as a legislator, including his prominent leadership role in passing a 56-cent increase in the state tobacco tax to create the Arkansas Trauma System. Wills has stated that he felt "excommunicated" from the Democratic party as a result of the 2010 primary. Sen. Elliott won the runoff with a total vote of 36,983 (54%) to Wills' 31,822 (46%), in spite of only carrying 1 out of the 8 counties (Pulaski) in the 2nd District. Wills conceded the race and immediately endorsed Elliott, earning a modicum of goodwill from party regulars. Elliott eventually lost to Republican Tim Griffin in a landslide (62%-38%). Wills has never commented publicly on the outcome of the 2010 General Election and he remains friendly with both Elliott and Griffin.

Wills and his wife, Dana, are currently partners in WSG Consulting, LLC, a government relations consulting firm, with former Speaker Bill Stovall and former legislators Kelley Linck and Rick Green. Although initially criticized for utilizing the "revolving door" between the legislature and the lobbying profession, Wills has since been consistently recognized by legislators and other insiders as one of the most respected bi-partisan lobbyists at the state capitol. While his name occasionally comes up in conversations about various political offices, both as a potential Democratic and Republican candidate, he has emphatically stated he will "never" run for public office again.

Wills is married to the former Dana Maxwell (b. September 30, 1976) of Keota, Oklahoma, a certified public accountant. They have two daughters, Rylee Elizabeth Wills (b. October 25, 2001) and Alley Reece Wills (b. May 26, 2009). Wills has one sister, Susan Wills Robinson (b. May 7, 1971). She is married to Lee Robinson (b. March 2, 1973). The Robinsons have two children, Sam Cooper Robinson (b. July 29, 2004) and Katherine "Kate" Lee Robinson (b. July 25, 2006).
