= Conway School District =

Conway School District can refer to:

- Conway School District (Arkansas) - Conway, Arkansas
- Conway School District (New Hampshire) in New Hampshire
- Conway Consolidated School District in Washington state
