= Itasca Independent School District =

School district in Texas

Location
- Itasca, TX ESC Region 12 USA

District information
- Type: Public

Students and staff
- Athletic conference: UIL Class A
- Colors: black and gold

Other information
- Mascot: wampus cat
- Website: www.itascaisd.org

Itasca Independent School District is a public school district based in Itasca, Texas (USA) located in north central Hill County. Its mascot is a creature from American folklore, the Wampus Cat.

In addition to Itasca, the district also serves a portion of Carl's Corner.

In 2009, the school district was rated "exemplary" by the Texas Education Agency.

The Itasca Independent School district received national attention by invoking an indefinite suspension on student Kenneth Fails at the beginning of the 2010-2011 school year. He had been suspended for several weeks while in fifth grade in the 2009-2010 school year as well, both for refusing to cut his long hair.

== Schools ==
- Itasca High School
- Itasca Middle School
- Itasca Elementary School
