= Feels Just Like It Should =

Feels Just Like It Should may refer to:

- "Feels Just Like It Should" (Jamiroquai song)
- "Feels Just Like It Should" (Pat Green song)
