= Feels Just Like It Should (Pat Green song) =

Single by Pat Green

from the album Cannonball
- Released: May 15, 2006
- Genre: Country
- Length: 3:47 (album version)
- Label: BNA
- Songwriters: Pat Green; Justin Pollard; Brett James
- Producers: Don Gehman; Justin Pollard

Pat Green singles chronology
"Baby Doll" (2005)	"Feels Just Like It Should" (2006)	"Dixie Lullaby" (2006)

"Feels Just Like It Should" is a song co-written and recorded by American country music artist Pat Green. It was released in May 2006 as the lead-off single from his album Cannonball. The song peaked at number 13 on the Billboard Hot Country Songs chart, becoming his biggest hit since 2003's "Wave on Wave". It was written by Green, Brett James and Justin Pollard.

== Content ==
The narrator talks about how in this moment with his significant other, everything "feels just like it should".

== Chart performance ==
"Feels Just Like It Should" debuted at number 32 on the U.S. Billboard Hot Country Songs for the week of May 27, 2006.

Chart (2006)	Peak position
US Hot Country Songs (Billboard)	13
US Billboard Hot 100	80

=== Year-end charts ===
Chart (2006)	Position
US Country Songs (Billboard)	52
