= Itasca Railroad Depot =

Coordinates: 32°09′53″N 97°08′31″W

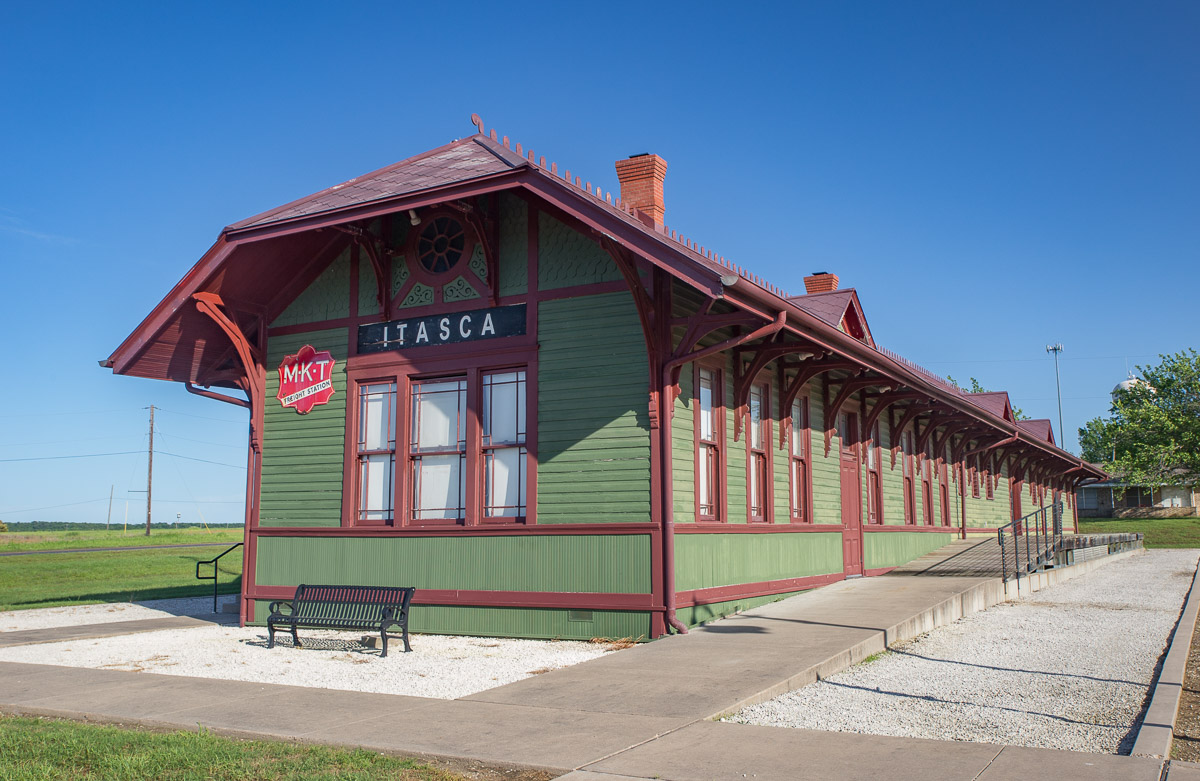

Itasca Railroad Depot is a former railroad depot in Itasca, Hill County, Texas. It was designated a Recorded Texas Historic Landmark in 1982.

== History ==
The depot was constructed in 1895, and was a station on the Missouri, Kansas and Texas Railroad. The depot building was relocated to the northeast part of the town in 1972.
