= Jayden Williams =

American football player (born 2003)

No. 66 – Arizona Cardinals
- Position: Offensive tackle
- Roster status: Active

Personal information
- Born: April 10, 2003 (age 23)
- Listed height: 6 ft 4 in (1.93 m)
- Listed weight: 307 lb (139 kg)

Career information
- High school: Conway (Conway, Arkansas)
- College: Ole Miss (2022–2025)
- NFL draft: 2026: 7th round, 217th overall pick

Career history
- Arizona Cardinals (2026–present)

Career NFL statistics as of Week 4, 2026
- Games played: 4
- Stats at Pro Football Reference

Jayden Kiyon Williams (born April 10, 2003) is an American professional football offensive tackle for the Arizona Cardinals of the National Football League (NFL). He played college football for the Ole Miss Rebels and was selected by the Cardinals in the seventh round of the 2026 NFL draft.

== Early life ==
Williams attended Conway High School and played basketball and football. As a junior, he led the basketball team to a state title. He helped the Wampus Cats return to the state tournament as a senior. Williams mainly played tight end and linebacker on the gridiron before switching to the offensive line midway through his senior year. Considered a three-star recruit, he committed to play college football at Ole Miss over offers from Missouri and Kansas.

== College career ==
Williams began his college career at left tackle and redshirted his freshman season. He started all 13 games as a freshman, earning freshman All-America honors. As a sophomore, he mostly played backup behind Victor Curne but started in the Peach Bowl versus Penn State. Williams started the first four games of his junior season and played in six games before his season was derailed by injuries. In 2025, Williams switched to right tackle. He started 15 games and allowed two sacks during the season.

== Professional career ==
Pre-draft measurables
Height	Weight	Arm length	Hand span	Wingspan	40-yard dash	10-yard split	20-yard split	20-yard shuttle	Three-cone drill	Vertical jump	Broad jump	Bench press
6 ft 4 1/2 in (1.94 m)	307 lb (139 kg)	33 1/2 in (0.85 m)	9 1/2 in (0.24 m)	6 ft 9 7/8 in (2.08 m)	5.04 s	1.80 s	2.88 s	4.80 s	7.65 s	29.5 in (0.75 m)	8 ft 11 in (2.72 m)	21 reps
All values from Pro Day

Williams was selected in the seventh round of the 2026 NFL draft with the 217th pick by the Arizona Cardinals.
