= Don't Break My Heart Again (Pat Green song) =

Single by Pat Green

from the album Lucky Ones
- Released: August 21, 2004
- Genre: Country
- Length: 4:50
- Label: Universal South
- Songwriter(s): Pat Green, Wade Bowen
- Producer(s): Don Gehman, Frank Rogers

Pat Green singles chronology
"Guy Like Me" (2003)	"Don't Break My Heart Again" (2004)	"Somewhere Between Texas and Mexico" (2005)

"Don't Break My Heart Again" is a song co-written and recorded by American country music artist Pat Green. It was released in August 2004 as the first single from the album Lucky Ones. The song reached #21 on the Billboard Hot Country Singles & Tracks chart. The song was written by Green and Wade Bowen.

== Chart performance ==
Chart (2004)	Peak position
US Bubbling Under Hot 100 Singles (Billboard)	16
US Hot Country Songs (Billboard)	21
