= Baby Doll (Pat Green song) =

Single by Pat Green

from the album Lucky Ones
- Released: March 5, 2005
- Genre: Country
- Length: 3:39
- Label: Universal South
- Songwriter(s): Pat Green, Rob Thomas
- Producer(s): Don Gehman, Frank Rogers

Pat Green singles chronology
"Somewhere Between Texas and Mexico" (2005)	"Baby Doll" (2005)	"Feels Just Like It Should" (2006)

"Baby Doll" is a song co-written and recorded by American country music artist Pat Green. It was released in March 2005 as the second single from the album Lucky Ones. The song reached #21 on the Billboard Hot Country Songs chart. The song was written by Green and Matchbox Twenty front man Rob Thomas.

== Chart performance ==
Chart (2005)	Peak position
US Bubbling Under Hot 100 Singles (Billboard)	24
US Hot Country Songs (Billboard)	21
