= Carry On (Pat Green song) =

Single by Pat Green

from the album Three Days
- Released: September 15, 2001
- Genre: Country
- Length: 4:58
- Label: Universal/Republic
- Songwriter(s): Pat Green, Walt Wilkins
- Producer(s): Lloyd Maines

Pat Green singles chronology
"Texas in 1880" (2001)	"Carry On" (2001)	"Three Days" (2002)

"Carry On" is a song co-written and recorded by American country music artist Pat Green. It was released in September 2001 as the first single from the album Three Days. The song reached #35 on the Billboard Hot Country Singles & Tracks chart. The song was written by Green and Walt Wilkins.

== Chart performance ==
Chart (2001)	Peak position
US Hot Country Songs (Billboard)	35
