= Country Star (song) =

Single by Pat Green

from the album What I'm For
- Released: February 28, 2009
- Genre: Country
- Length: 3:45
- Label: BNA
- Songwriter(s): Pat Green, Brett James
- Producer(s): Dann Huff

Pat Green singles chronology
"Let Me" (2008)	"Country Star" (2009)	"What I'm For" (2009)

"Country Star" is a song co-written and recorded by American country music artist Pat Green. It was released in February 2009 as the second single from the album What I'm For. The song reached #32 on the Billboard Hot Country Songs chart. The song was written by Green and Brett James.

== Critical reception ==
A review at www.countrymusicuniverse.net said the song is gimmicky, bland and altogether misses the mark. It shameless namechecks artists such as Faith Hill, Kenny Chesney, Tim McGraw, Big & Rich, Brooks & Dunn, Vince Gill, Willie Nelson, Carrie Underwood, Keith Urban and alludes to a Toby Keith song with not even so much as a gesture toward originality. Along with its vapid lyrics, the production is unbearably stale.

The progressive decay of Green's once quality and fresh-sounding material is overtly purposeful, so it is impossible to feel sorry for him. It, nevertheless, is depressing to witness all the same.

To completely sell out, as Green has no doubt done, is a sad price to pay, all for the sake of being a "country star".

== Chart performance ==
Chart (2009)	Peak position
US Hot Country Songs (Billboard)	32
