= Mark Kemp =

American music journalist and author (born 1960)

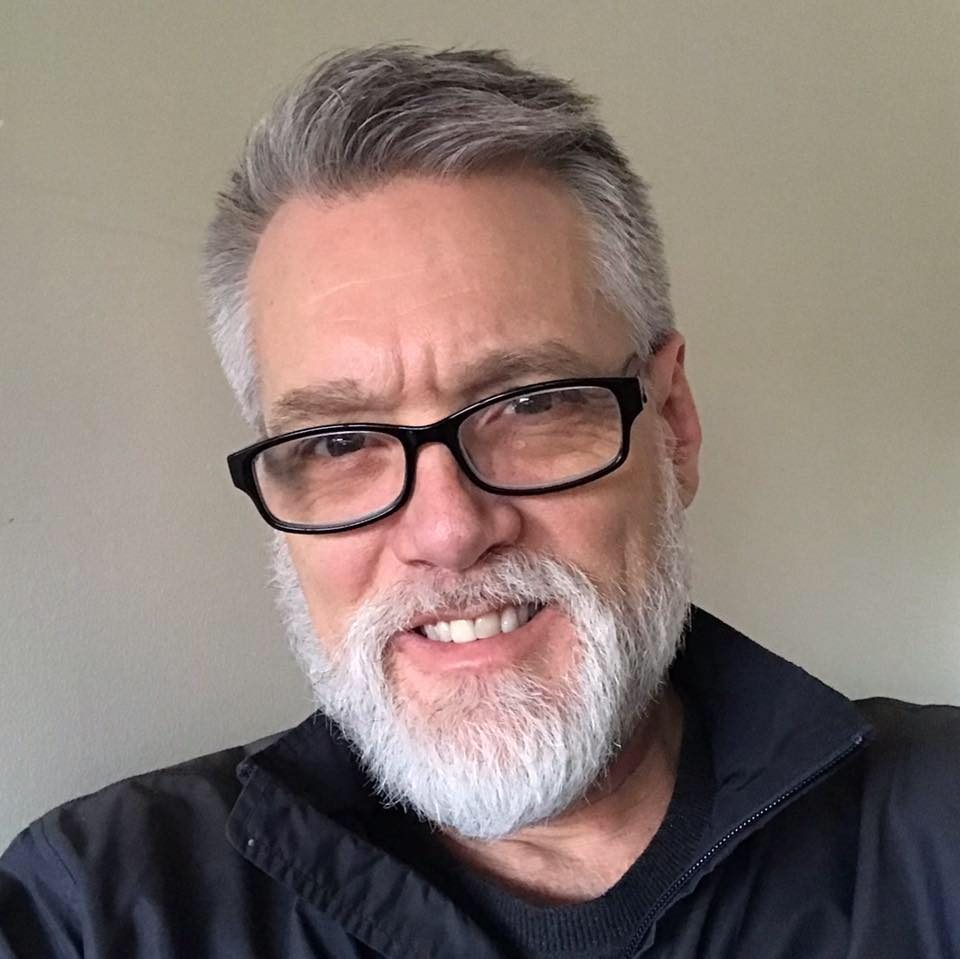
- Born: April 10, 1960 (age 66) Asheboro, North Carolina
- Occupation: Author, journalist
- Genre: Music pop culture

Mark Kemp (born April 10, 1960) is an American music journalist and author. A graduate of East Carolina University, he has served as music editor for Rolling Stone and vice president of music editorial for MTV Networks. In 1997 he received a Grammy nomination for his liner notes to the CD Farewells & Fantasies, a retrospective of music by '60s protest singer Phil Ochs. His book Dixie Lullaby: A Story of Music, Race and New Beginnings in a New South was published by Free Press/Simon & Schuster in 2004 and issued in soft cover by the University of Georgia Press in 2006.

Kemp began his journalism career as a newspaper reporter at the Times-News (Burlington, North Carolina), and later as an editor at the science magazine Discover. In the late 1980s, he began writing for the alternative music and culture magazine Option. The Los Angeles–based publication was one of the chief chroniclers of the post-punk independent alternative rock, hip-hop, experimental jazz, electronica, and avant-garde music scenes, as well as a rich source of information on so-called world music. Kemp became the editor of Option in 1991, the year Nirvana's breakthrough album Nevermind stormed the pop charts. Option's visibility in the early '90s led to Kemp's hirings at Rolling Stone and MTV.

During Kemp's tenure at Rolling Stone, several acts made first-time appearances on the magazine's cover including Beck, Marilyn Manson, the Prodigy and Sean Combs. Kemp also was responsible for assigning a controversial investigative cover story on Pearl Jam singer Eddie Vedder, reported by a team of three journalists, staff writers John Colapinto (now at The New Yorker), Matt Hendrickson (Garden and Gun) and Eric Boehlert (Media Matters), and without Vedder's cooperation. At MTV Kemp was part of a team responsible for launching the popular daytime music-video series Total Request Live; he also helped develop shows for MTV's sister station VH1.

Kemp left MTV in 2000 to focus on writing his social/cultural memoir Dixie Lullaby, in which he revisited the southern rock of his youth and examined its social and psychological impact on young Southerners in the years following the civil rights movement. In 2002 he returned to his home state of North Carolina, where he served as entertainment editor of The Charlotte Observer and editor in chief of the alternative weekly Creative Loafing. From 2014 to 2016, Kemp served briefly as the editor of Acoustic Guitar (magazine) and SF Weekly in the San Francisco Bay Area, but returned to North Carolina where he serves as senior editor at Our State.
