= Dixie Lullaby (book) =

Book by Mark Kemp

- Author: Mark Kemp
- Language: English
- Genre: Non-fiction, music, history
- Publication date: 2004
- Publication place: United States

Dixie Lullaby: A Story of Music, Race and New Beginnings in a New South is a book by U.S. music journalist Mark Kemp that traces the evolution of southern rock between the years 1968 and 1992, and examines the music's social and psychological impact on young Southerners in the years following the civil rights movement. The book covers the contributions of numerous performers including the Allman Brothers Band, Lynyrd Skynyrd, Dr. John, R.E.M., Jason & the Scorchers, Gov't Mule, The Drive-By Truckers and Steve Earle.

Kemp has noted in interviews that the book had a personal resonance, rising from his formative years in Asheboro, North Carolina and his experiences in the music industry.

The book was originally published in a hardcover edition by Free Press in 2004 (ISBN 0743237943) and reprinted in a paperback edition by the University of Georgia Press in 2006 (ISBN 0820328723).
