= Lucky Ones (album) =

Studio album by Pat Green
- Released: October 19, 2004
- Genre: Country
- Label: Universal South
- Producer: Don Gehman, Frank Rogers

Pat Green chronology
Wave on Wave (2003)	Lucky Ones (2004)	Cannonball (2006)

Singles from Lucky Ones
- 1. "Don't Break My Heart Again" Released: August 21, 2004; 2. "Somewhere Between Texas and Mexico" Released: 2005; 3. "Baby Doll" Released: March 5, 2005

Professional ratings
Review scores
Source	Rating
Allmusic	4/5 stars

Lucky Ones is the third studio album by American country music artist Pat Green. His final album for Universal Records, it was released in 2004, and it produced three singles for him on the Billboard country charts: "Don't Break My Heart Again" (No. 21), "Somewhere Between Texas and Mexico" (No. 42) and "Baby Doll" (No. 21). "One Thing" was written by Jack Ingram, who previously recorded it on his 2002 album Electric.

== Track listing ==
No.	Title	Writer(s)	Length
1.	"Baby Doll"	Pat Green, Rob Thomas	3:39
2.	"Lucky Ones"	Radney Foster	3:29
3.	"Somewhere Between Texas and Mexico"	Irene Kelley, Trent Summar	2:58
4.	"Don't Break My Heart Again"	Green, Wade Bowen	4:50
5.	"My Little Heaven"	Green, Thomas	3:35
6.	"College"	Green, Brad Paisley	3:40
7.	"One Thing"	Jack Ingram	3:29
8.	"Over and Over"	Green, Fred LeBlanc	2:53
9.	"Long Way to Go (Headed Home)"	Green, David Neuhauser, Justin Pollard	3:58
10.	"Temporary Angel"	Green, Drew Womack	4:12
11.	"It's Time"	Foster, Green	3:50
12.	"Sweet Revenge"	Green, Ray Wylie Hubbard	3:24
13.	"College" (re-recording with Brad Paisley)	Green, Paisley	3:40

== Personnel ==
- Pat Green - lead vocals, background vocals, acoustic guitar
- Brendon Anthony - mandolin, violin
- Kenny Aronoff - drums
- Mike Daly - Dobro, steel guitar
- Lisa Germano - violin
- David Grissom - acoustic guitar, electric guitar
- Billy Hawn - percussion, tambourine
- John Hobbs - piano, keyboards, Hammond organ
- Fred LeBlanc - background vocals
- Jordan McBride - electric guitar, mandolin
- David Neuhauser - piano, electric guitar, Hammond organ
- Brad Paisley - electric guitar and duet vocals on "College"
- Herb Pedersen - acoustic guitar, banjo, background vocals
- Justin Pollard - drums, tambourine
- Michael Tarabay - bass guitar
- Amanda Wilkinson - background vocals

== Chart performance ==
=== Album ===
Chart (2004)	Peak position
U.S. Billboard Top Country Albums	6
U.S. Billboard 200	28
