= Three Days (album) =

Studio album by Pat Green
- Released: October 16, 2001
- Genre: Country
- Length: 58:16
- Label: Universal/Republic
- Producer: Greg Ladanyi (tracks 3, 4, 6), Lloyd Maines (all tracks)

Pat Green chronology
Songs We Wish We'd Written (2001)	Three Days (2001)	Wave on Wave (2003)

Singles from Three Days
- 1. "Texas on My Mind" Released: 2001; 2. "Carry On" Released: 2001; 3. "Three Days" Released: 2002

Professional ratings
Review scores
Source	Rating
Allmusic	4/5 stars

Three Days is the debut studio album released in 2001 by American country music artist Pat Green. It was also his major-label debut, following three self-released studio albums, two live compilations, and an independent collaborative album. Three Days produced two chart singles for Green on the Billboard country charts: "Carry On" at No. 35 and the title track at No. 36. The former was originally recorded on Green's 2000 album Carry On and was later re-recorded on his 2009 album What I'm For, while "Texas on My Mind" was previously released on the album Songs We Wish We'd Written, a collaborative album with Cory Morrow released earlier in 2001.

== Track listing ==
No.	Title	Writer(s)	Length
1.	"Carry On"	Pat Green, Walt Wilkins	4:58
2.	"Threadbare Gypsy Soul" (duet with Willie Nelson)	Green	4:53
3.	"Three Days"	Green, Radney Foster	3:45
4.	"Who's to Say"	Green, Wilkins, Mark Winston Kirk	4:45
5.	"Galleywinter"	Green	3:57
6.	"Wrong Side of Town"	Trish Murphy	4:23
7.	"We've All Got Our Reasons"	Wilkins, Billy Montana	3:23
8.	"Whiskey"	Green	4:52
9.	"Crazy"	Green	5:28
10.	"Take Me Out to a Dancehall"	Green	3:39
11.	"Count Your Blessings"	Bill Erickson	4:21
12.	"Southbound 35"	Green	5:12
13.	"Texas on My Mind" (duet with Cory Morrow)	Django Walker	4:39

== Personnel ==
Adapted from liner notes.

- Bukka Allen - accordion (tracks 2, 11), keyboards (tracks 1, 5, 9, 13)
- Brendon Anthony - violin
- Brett Danaher - acoustic guitar, electric guitar, baritone guitar
- Will Dupuy - upright bass (track 11)
- Glen Fukunaga - bass guitar (tracks 1, 5, 8–10, 13)
- Pat Green - acoustic guitar, harmonica, lead vocals, background vocals
- David Grissom - electric guitar (track 1)
- Terri Hendrix - background vocals (track 9)
- Bob Livingston - background vocals (track 13)
- Lloyd Maines - acoustic guitar, electric guitar, baritone guitar, pedal steel guitar, lap steel guitar, dobro, papoose, mandolin, percussion, background vocals
- Jordan McBride - bass guitar, upright bass, mandolin, background vocals
- Cory Morrow - duet vocals (track 13)
- Trish Murphy - background vocals (track 6)
- Willie Nelson - duet vocals (track 2)
- David Neuhauser - electric guitar, acoustic slide guitar, electric slide guitar, Hammond B-3 organ, Wurlitzer, background vocals
- Paul Pearcy - percussion (tracks 1, 5, 8, 9)
- Justin Pollard - drums, percussion
- Chris Skiles - drums (tracks 1, 5)
- Walt Wilkins - background vocals (tracks 3, 4, 8, 11)

== Chart performance ==
=== Weekly charts ===
Chart (2001)	Peak position
US Billboard 200	86
US Top Country Albums (Billboard)	7

=== Year-end charts ===
Chart (2002)	Position
US Top Country Albums (Billboard)	56
