= Greg Lasker =

American football player (born 1964)

No. 46, 31, 49
- Position: Safety

Personal information
- Born: September 28, 1964 (age 62); St. Louis, Missouri, U.S.
- Listed height: 6 ft 0 in (1.83 m)
- Listed weight: 200 lb (91 kg)

Career information
- High school: Conway (Arkansas)
- College: Arkansas
- NFL draft: 1986: 2nd round, 53rd overall pick

Career history
- New York Giants (1986–1988); Chicago Bears (1988); Phoenix Cardinals (1988)

Awards and highlights
- Super Bowl champion (XXI); 1st team All-Southwest Conference (1985); Third-team All-American (1985); Arkansas Razorbacks Football 1980–1989 All-Decade Team

Career NFL statistics
- Sacks: 2.5
- Interceptions: 1
- Stats at Pro Football Reference

Gregory Cephus Lasker (born September 28, 1964) is an American former professional football player who was a safety for three seasons in the National Football League (NFL).

Lasker was born in St. Louis, Missouri and played scholastically at Conway High School in Arkansas. He played collegiately at Arkansas, where he earned 1st team All-Southwest Conference and third-team All-American honors as a senior. He was named to the Arkansas 1980–1989 All-Decade Team.

Lasker was selected by the New York Giants in the second round of the 1986 NFL draft. He was with the Giants for the 1986 and 1987 seasons, earning a Super Bowl ring as a rookie (Super Bowl XXI). He was released midway through the 1988 season, and had a "cup of coffee" with the Chicago Bears and Phoenix Cardinals.

Life After Football:

Since Retirement Greg has successfully owned/operated a construction company in central Arkansas.
