= Marvin Delph =

American basketball player (born 1956)

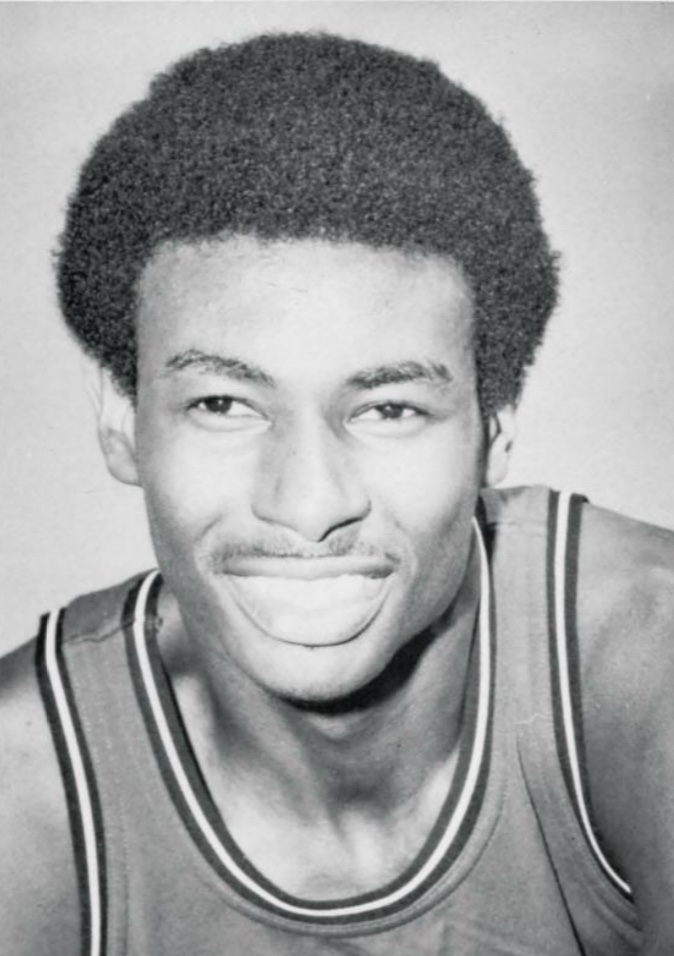
- Delph in his junior year at Arkansas

Personal information
- Born: September 15, 1956 (age 70) Conway, Arkansas, U.S.
- Listed height: 6 ft 4 in (1.93 m)
- Listed weight: 180 lb (82 kg)

Career information
- High school: Conway (Conway, Arkansas)
- College: Arkansas (1974–1978)
- NBA draft: 1978: 3rd round, 65th overall pick
- Drafted by: Buffalo Braves
- Position: Shooting guard
- Stats at Basketball Reference

Marvin Delph (born September 15, 1956) is an American former basketball player, who experienced his greatest success at the college level.

In high school, Delph led the Conway Wampus Cats to two state basketball championships, in 1973 and 1974.

Delph was a member of the University of Arkansas Razorbacks NCAA Final Four team in 1978. Along with Sidney Moncrief and Ron Brewer, he was labeled as one of the "Triplets", a trio of Arkansas-born, similarly sized players who led Arkansas basketball through a series of team wins after years of consistent losses.

Following his college career, Delph was drafted twice, first in the 3rd round of the 1978 NBA draft by the Buffalo Braves and then in the sixth round of the 1979 NBA draft by the Boston Celtics. Unlike his fellow Triplets, Delph never played in the NBA, despite several attempts. He continued playing amateur basketball with the Athletes in Action team, a religiously oriented team.

Delph played for the United States men's national basketball team at the 1978 FIBA World Championship, a team composed primarily of Athletes in Action players.

Delph was inducted into the Arkansas Sports Hall of Fame in 1998.
