= Conway High School (Arkansas) =

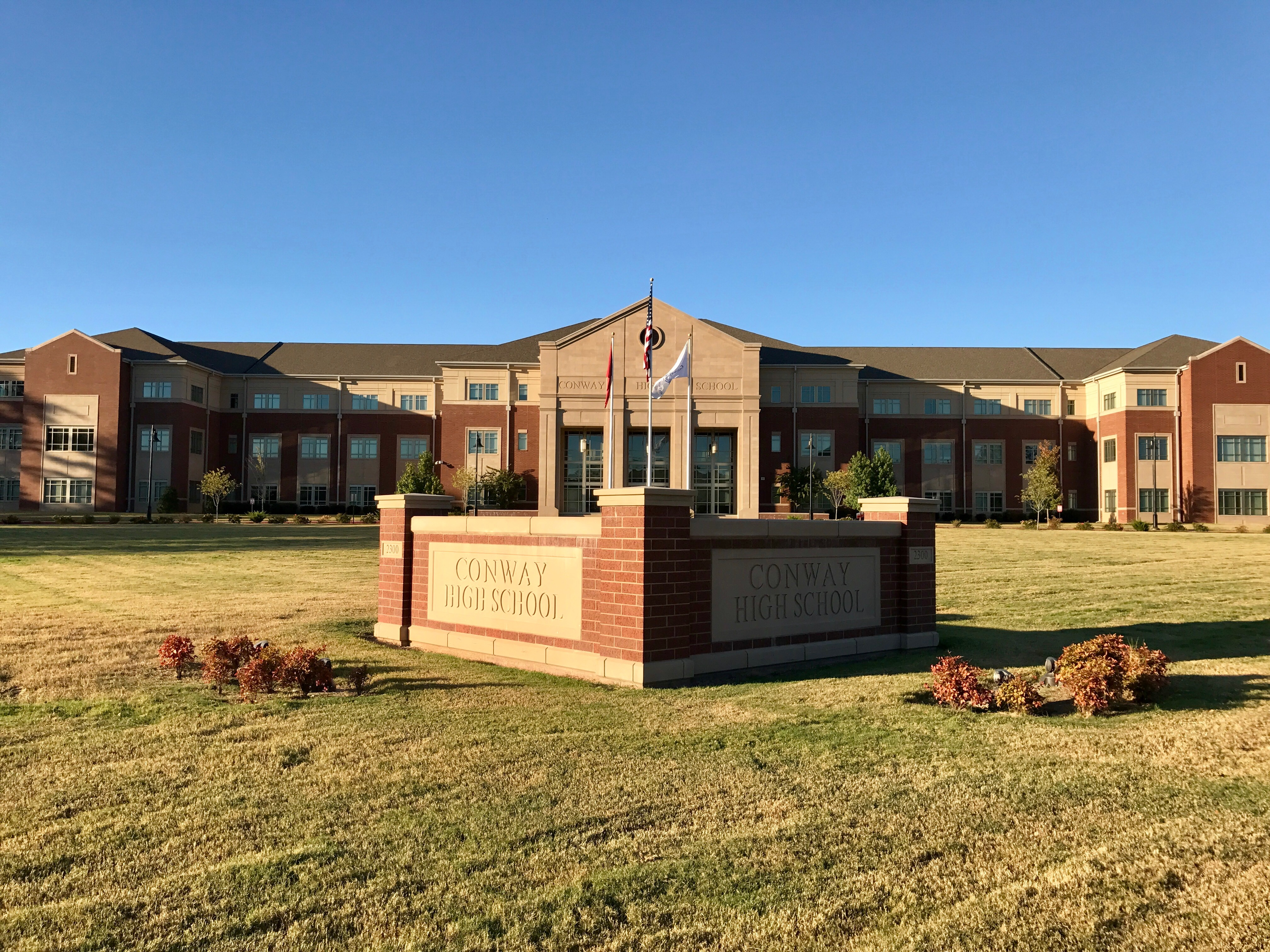

Location
- 2300 Prince Street; Conway, Arkansas 72034; United States; 35°5′35″N 92°27′33″W

Information
- Status: Open
- School district: Conway Public Schools
- CEEB code: 040490
- NCES School ID: 00184
- Staff: 136.41 (on an FTE basis)
- Grades: 10-12
- Enrollment: 2,350 (2024-25)
  - Grade 10: 802
  - Grade 11: 800
  - Grade 12: 748
- Student to teacher ratio: 17.23
- Campus type: Urban
- Colors: Blue and white
- Athletics conference: 7A Central
- Mascot: Wampus Cat
- Team name: Conway Wampus Cats
- Yearbook: The Wampus Cat
- Affiliation: Arkansas Activities Association; Conway Career Center
- Website: www.conwayschools.org/o/chs

Conway High School is a comprehensive public school in Conway, Arkansas, United States. Conway High School serves over 2,000 students and is administered by the Conway School District. The school has been nationally recognized as a Blue Ribbon School of Excellence, and has won 50 state championships in numerous interscholastic sports.

The school district operating the school includes the majority of Conway as well as small portions of Holland and Mayflower.

== History ==
Established in 1928, the original buildings of Conway High School served the surrounding community until new facilities were built in 1937 at the corner of Prince St and Davis St. A cafeteria was added in 1948 and a gymnasium in 1949. The cafeteria was demolished in 1961. A new high school campus, using a honeycomb pods system, was constructed in 1968 five blocks west of the original high school on Prince St. Due to student growth in the 1990s, a new junior high was built and the high school's student population was broken up, with 9th and 10th graders attending class at the original high school at Prince and Davis Streets, called the East Campus, while 11th and 12th graders attended class at the main campus, called the West Campus. In 2012 construction of a new high school began next to the old West Campus pods, and was completed in 2013. The pods buildings were then demolished. The new West Campus has 3 floors and 2100 students as of the 2015-16 school year.

== Academics ==
Conway High School is accredited by the Arkansas Department of Education (ADE). In 1984-85, Conway High School was honored as a National Blue Ribbon School by the U.S. Department of Education (ED).

=== Curriculum ===
The school's assumed course of study is based on the Smart Core curriculum developed by the ADE. The school offers regular (core and career focus) courses and exams and students may select from 22 Advanced Placement (AP) coursework and exams that provide an opportunity for college credit.

=== Conway Area Career Center ===
Located on the campus of Conway High School is the Conway Area Career Center, which fosters career and technical education. The Conway Area Career Center offers numerous professional certification programs in welding, photography, health science technology for medical professionals, and family and consumer sciences. The Center maintains affiliations with the various schools' programs for Future Business Leaders of America (FBLA), Family, Career and Community Leaders of America (FCCLA), FFA, SkillsUSA, Health Occupations Students of America (HOSA), and JROTC.

== Extracurricular activities ==
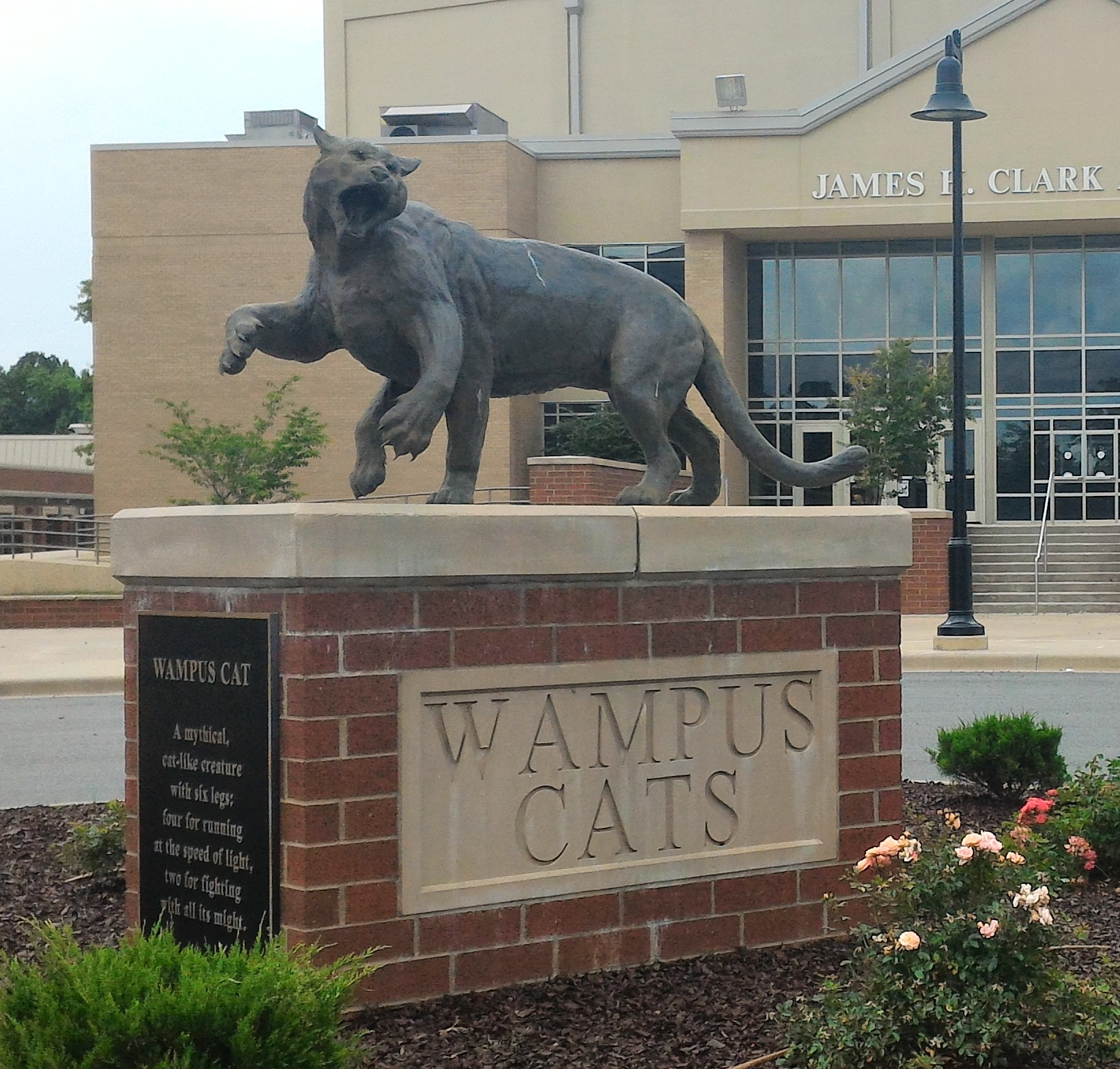
Statue of the school's mascot in front of James H. Clark Auditorium

The Conway High School mascot is the Wampus cat, stylized as a mythical, 6-legged swamp cat. The school colors are royal blue and white.

=== Athletics ===
The Conway Wampus Cats participate in numerous interscholastic sports and activities in the state's largest classification (7A) within the 7A/6A Central Conference administered by the Arkansas Activities Association including: baseball, basketball (boys/girls), bowling (boys/girls), cheer, cross country (boys/girls), dance, football, golf (boys/girls), soccer (boys/girls), softball, swimming (boys/girls), tennis (boys/girls), track (boys/girls), volleyball and wrestling. Home football games are played at John McConnell Stadium, named in 1993 after the late community leader and school board president.

The Conway Wampus Cats have been competitive at the district and state level for several years. For example, the Wampus Cats baseball teams have been to ten state championship games (winning four total) and 30 state tournaments. The girls track teams won four consecutive titles from 1986 to 1989. In all, the Conway Wampus Cats have won 58 state championships. The 2026 football team is currently 9-1, ranked #1 in the state, and won the 7A Central conference championship.

- Football state champions (2x): - 1964, 1967
- Volleyball state champions (4x): - 1998, 2018, 2024, 2025
- Cross country state champions (4x): Boys – 1964, 1965, 1987 / Girls – 1986
- Golf state champions (9x): Boys – 1978, 1982, 2002, 2006, 2008, 2011, 2012 / Girls - 2012, 2016
- Basketball state champions (8x): Boys - 1973, 1974, 1976 ^, 2010, 2020 / Girls - 2008, 2014, 2023
- Swimming & diving state champions (4x): Boys – 1988, 2020 / Girls – 1988, 2013
- Soccer state champions (6x): Boys - 2004, 2008, 2022, 2023, 2024 / Girls – 2011
- Wrestling state champions: - 2011
- Bowling state champions (4x): Boys - 2025 / Girls - 2003, 2024, 2025
- Baseball state champions (4x): - 1911, 1989, 2011, 2022
- Track & Field state champions (12x): Boys – 1953, 1954, 1957, 1960, 1963, 1981, 1989, 1992 / Girls – 1986, 1987, 1988, 1989

^ - The 1976 boys basketball team finished undefeated (36-0) and won the Overall State championship.

In 2002, then-baseball head coach Noel Boucher, for his work on Wampus Cat Field, was selected as the District 6 Groundkeeper/Field of the Year by the National High School Baseball Coaches of America.

Beginning in 2019, the Conway School District opened the Wampus Cat Sports Hall of Fame. The initial class inducted twelve of the greatest athletes and coaches ever produced by Conway High. Through the 2024 class, there are currently 50 inductees, to include players from nearly every sport, coaches, and championship teams from the schools past.

=== Clubs and traditions ===
Conway High School also has a dominant quiz bowl program. The team has made it to 7A division state finals from 2015 to 2019, winning in 2015, 2017, and 2018, and finishing as runners-up in 2016, 2019 and 2023.

In 2019, Conway High School’s Mock Trial team won the state championship and advanced to the national competition, where they placed 30th.

== Notable alumni ==
The following are notable people associated with Conway High School. If the person was a Conway High School student, the number in parentheses indicates the year of graduation; if the person was a faculty or staff member, that person's title and years of association are listed.

- Marvin Delph (1974) — former high school and collegiate basketball player; led Wampus Cats to state titles in 1973 and 1974; was a member of the famed "Triplets" on the 1977-78 Arkansas Razorbacks men's basketball team that won the 1978 Southwest Conference championship and made it to the 1978 Final Four
- Peyton Hillis (2004) — former Arkansas Razorback running back, was on the 2006 Southeastern Conference Western Division championship team; spent 7 years in the National Football League (NFL), rushed for over 1,000 yards in 2010 for the Cleveland Browns; was on the cover of the Madden NFL 12 video game; actor
- Tim Horton (1986) - former Arkansas Razorbacks football player, and assistant football coach, played wide receiver for the Hogs 1988 and 1989 Southwest Conference championship teams
- Mike Isom - former Wampus Cat football player and retired coach. As head coach from 1990 to 1999, Isom led the University of Central Arkansas to three conference championships and the 1991 NAIA national championship
- Greg Lasker (1982) — college professor; former Arkansas Razorback safety, was on the 1985 Holiday Bowl championship team, named to the Arkansas 1980's All-Decade Team; NFL safety from 1986 to 1988; won Super Bowl XXI with the NY Giants
- Amy Miles - recording artist and performer
- Bryce Molder (1997) — professional golfer on the PGA Tour; won the 2011 Frys.com Open
- Shannon Money (1996) - former all state offensive lineman for Conway, played for the Arkansas Razorbacks from 1996 to 1999, starting tackle for the 1998 Southeastern Conference West Division champions, and helped the Hogs beat Texas in the 2000 Cotton Bowl Classic.
- Ernie Ruple (1964) — former High School All-State, University of Arkansas Razorback, and NFL player.
- Stanley Russ - lawyer and politician; Arkansas state senator from 1975-2001
- Ken Stephens (1948) - former Wampus Cat football and track and field athlete, played for the Arkansas Razorbacks; head coach of University of Central Arkansas, Arkansas Tech University, and Lamar University in Beaumont, Texas
- Jayden Williams (2022) – NFL offensive tackle for the Arizona Cardinals
- Robbie Wills (1986) — lawyer and politician; Speaker of the House, Arkansas House of Representatives
