= Wampus cat =

Mythical creature from American folklore

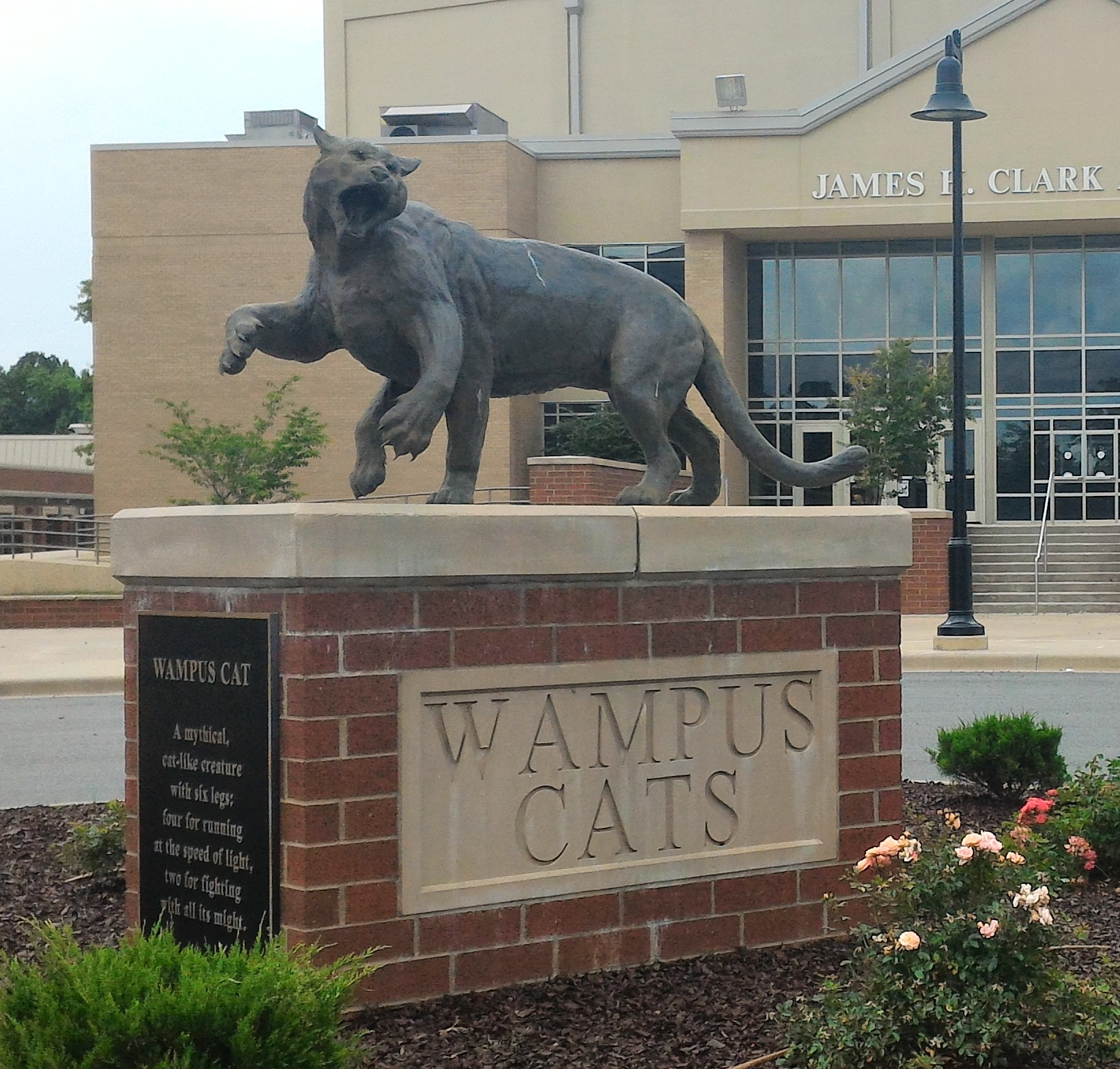
Bronze statue of the six-legged wampus cat located at Conway High School

A wampus cat is a cat-like creature in American folklore that varies widely in appearance, ranging from frightful to comical, depending on region. It has its origins in Cherokee mythology and Appalachian legend. It is also known as a "gallywampus" in Missouri, "whistling wampus" in the Ozarks, simply "wampus" in Appalachia.

== Description ==
The physical appearance of the wampus cat has varied across time and region. Early references from the American Dialect Society described the wampus cat as "a creature heard whining about camps at night," "a spiritual green-eyed cat, having occult powers," or "an undefined imaginary animal." Generally, the wampus cat is a large feline with dark fur. Notably, some depictions note the cat as having six legs, while some only describe it as having four.

Its size ranges from approximately seven to twenty feet long and up to five hundred pounds. In 1936, The Knoxville News-Sentinel describes the wampus cat as having "...a body 15 or 20 feet long, and eyes like small moons..." Its facial features have been described as being similar to either a bobcat or a panther. Descriptions of the wampus cat consistently mention glowing green or yellow eyes and large claws, as well as an ability to produce loud, scream-like howls similar to cougars. The habitat of the creature also varies, with some noting that it is found in wooded areas while others describe it in swamps. Writing in 1951, folklorist Vance Randolph described the wampus cat as "a kind of amphibious panther which leaps into the water and swims like a colossal mink." Some legends include an ability to shapeshift or become invisible.

The wampus cat was mentioned in newspaper accounts of the 1930s in the Piedmont of North Carolina, where the creature was accused of killing livestock. It is frequently attributed as the cause of dog killings.

== Use in popular culture ==
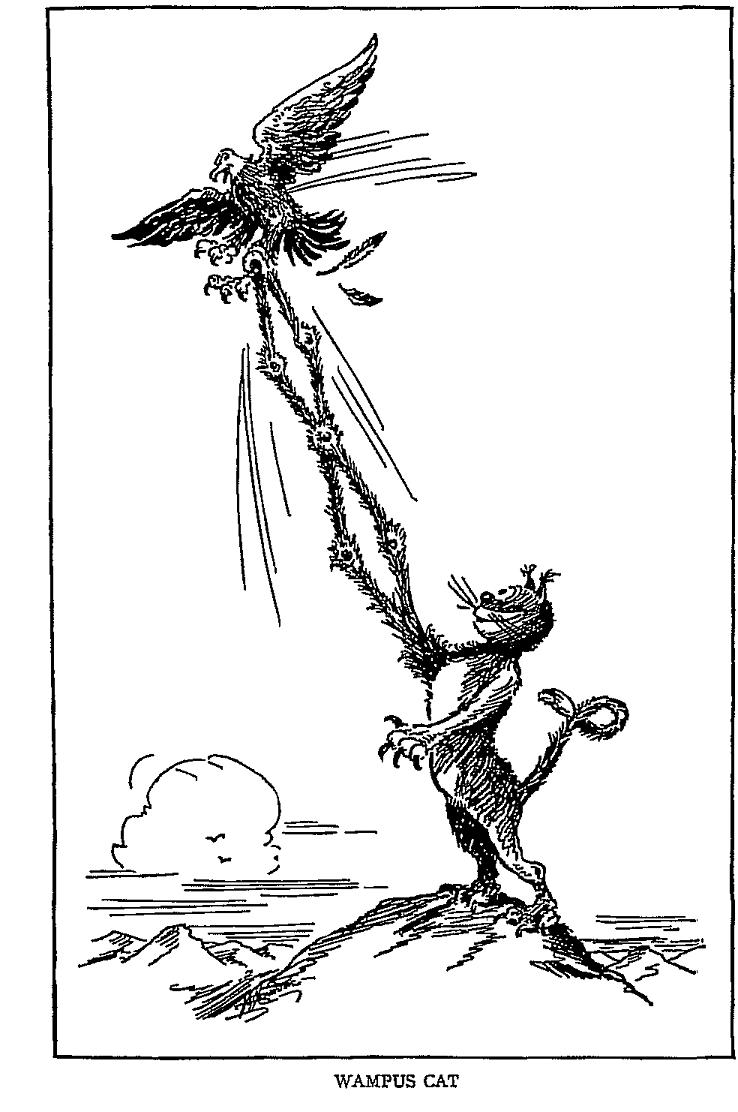
Margaret R. Tryon's humorous depiction of the Wampus cat catching an eagle, from the 1939 book Fearsome Critters

The Oxford English Dictionary describes the "catawumpus" or "cata wumpus" as 19th-century American slang for "a bogy, a fierce imaginary animal."

Henry H. Tryon's humorous 1939 book Fearsome Critters describes the wampus cat as being native to Idaho, and having an "amazing right forearm" that "works like a folding pruning hook on the pantographic principle". He gives it the binomial nomenclature Aquilamappreluendens forcipe.

The wampus cat is also the namesake for one of the four houses of Ilvermorny School of Witchcraft and Wizardry in the Harry Potter universe.

The Wampus Cats was the name of a blues band featuring Oscar "Buddy" Woods active in the 1930s.

The wampus cat is the mascot of the following schools:

- Atoka High School and middle school, Atoka, Oklahoma
- Clark Fork Junior/Senior High School, Clark Fork, Idaho
- Conway High School, Conway, Arkansas
- Itasca High School, Itasca, Texas
- Leesville High School, Leesville, Louisiana

== See also ==
- Bobcat
- North American cougar
- Underwater panther
