= Itasca High School (Texas) =

Location
- 123 North College Street; Itasca, Texas 76055-2307; United States; 32.164578°N 97.145177°W

Information
- School type: Public high school
- School district: Itasca Independent School District
- Principal: trevor thorne
- Teaching staff: 20.91 (FTE)
- Grades: 9-12
- Enrollment: 201 (2023–2024)
- Student to teacher ratio: 9.61
- Colors: Black & Gold
- Athletics conference: UIL Class 2A
- Mascot: Wampus Cats/Lady Cats
- Website: Itasca High School

Itasca High School is a 2A public high school located in Itasca, Texas (USA). It is part of the Itasca Independent School District located in north central Hill County. In 2013, the school was rated "Academically Acceptable" by the Texas Education Agency.

== Unique nickname ==
According to local legend in Itasca, a student from the late 1920s helped them come up with one of the state's nicknames: Wampus Cats. ESPN has done a story on it, as has The New York Times. A Dallas radio station has called it the quintessential Texas high school football nickname.

Nancy Bowman, a lifelong Itascan who runs the school's special services, explains that the team was having trouble finding a nickname until Wampus Cats emerged from a post-game locker room celebration.

Wow, we were really Wampus Cats tonight! shouted Trav Burks.

Leesville High School in Louisiana and Conway High in Arkansas also have the Wampus Cat as a mascot.

== Athletics ==
The Itasca Wampus Cats compete in the following sports:

- Baseball
- Basketball
- Cross Country
- Football
- Softball
- Track and Field
- Volleyball
