= What I'm For =

Studio album by Pat Green
- Released: January 27, 2009
- Recorded: 2008 at Blackbird Studios and The Sound Kitchen
- Genre: Country
- Length: 39:01
- Label: BNA
- Producer: Dann Huff

Pat Green chronology
Cannonball (2006)	What I'm For (2009)	Songs We Wish We'd Written II (2012)

Singles from What I'm For
- 1. "Let Me" Released: June 23, 2008; 2. "Country Star" Released: March 2009; 3. "What I'm For" Released: May 2009

Professional ratings
Review scores
Source	Rating
AllMusic	3/5 stars
Country Weekly	3.5/5 stars
Country Standard Time	
Houston Chronicle	2/4 stars
The 9513	3.5/5 stars

What I'm For is the fifth studio album by American country music artist Pat Green. It was released on January 27, 2009 (see 2009 in country music) on BNA Records and produced by Dann Huff. The album is his second for BNA and his eighth overall. Lead-off single "Let Me" has charted in the Top 20 on the Hot Country Songs chart, peaking at No. 12.

== Content ==
The first single release from the album is "Let Me". This song is his thirteenth chart entry on the Hot Country Songs charts, peaking at No. 12 in February 2009 and becoming his second-highest peak. Following this song is "Country Star", released in March 2009. "Country Star" was withdrawn as a single in May 2009, and "What I'm For" subsequently became the third single release.

Also included on this album is a re-recording of "Carry On", originally released on his 2000 album Carry On and later released as a single from his 2001 album Three Days. Green co-wrote eight of the ten songs on this album.

== Track listing ==
No.	Title	Writer(s)	Length
1.	"Footsteps of Our Fathers"	Pat Green, Brett James	4:17
2.	"What I'm For"	Marc Beeson, Allen Shamblin	3:36
3.	"Feeling Pretty Good Tonight"	Green, Bobby Pinson	3:57
4.	"Lucky"	Green, Patrick Davis, Justin Pollard	3:38
5.	"In This World"	Green	2:57
6.	"Country Star"	Green, James	3:45
7.	"Let Me"	Beeson, Danny Orton	3:50
8.	"In It for the Money"	Green, Davis	3:41
9.	"Carry On"	Green, Walt Wilkins	4:33
10.	"In the Middle of the Night"	Green, Chuck Cannon, Lari White	4:41

== Personnel ==
As listed in liner notes.

- Tim Akers – accordion, Hammond B-3 organ, keyboards
- Brendon Anthony – fiddle
- J. T. Corenflos – electric guitar
- Clay Corn – keyboards
- Chad Cromwell – drums
- Brett Danaher – electric guitar
- Eric Darken – percussion
- Dan Dugmore – steel guitar
- Jay DeMarcus – bass guitar
- Shannon Forrest – drums
- Paul Franklin – steel guitar
- Pat Green – lead vocals, background vocals, acoustic guitar
- Dann Huff – electric guitar
- Charlie Judge – keyboards
- Chris McHugh – drums
- Jerry McPherson – electric guitar
- Justin Andrew Pollard – drums
- Adam Shoenfeld – electric guitar
- Chris Skrobot – electric guitar
- Jimmie Lee Sloas – bass guitar
- Michael Taraby – bass guitar
- Russell Terrell – background vocals
- Ilya Toshinsky – acoustic guitar
- Glenn Worf – bass guitar
- Jonathan Yudkin – fiddle, mandolin

== Chart performance ==
=== Album ===
Chart (2009)	Peak position
U.S. Billboard Top Country Albums	2
U.S. Billboard 200	18
