= Ernie Ruple =

American football player (1945–2024)

No. 73
- Position: Defensive end

Personal information
- Born: October 27, 1945; Conway, Arkansas, U.S.
- Died: June 9, 2024 (aged 78); Conway, Arkansas, U.S.
- Listed height: 6 ft 4 in (1.93 m)
- Listed weight: 256 lb (116 kg)

Career information
- High school: Conway
- College: Arkansas (1964-1967)
- NFL draft: 1968: 2nd round, 36th overall pick

Career history
- Pittsburgh Steelers (1968)

Awards and highlights
- First-team All-SWC (1967)
- Stats at Pro Football Reference

Coy Ernest Ruple (October 27, 1945 – June 9, 2024) was an American professional football player who was a tackle for two seasons with the Pittsburgh Steelers of the National Football League (NFL).

Ruple played college football for the Arkansas Razorbacks before being selected in the second round of the 1968 NFL/AFL draft. He played high school football at Conway High School in Conway, Arkansas.

Ruple died on June 9, 2024, at the age of 78.
