= Let Me (Pat Green song) =

Single by Pat Green

from the album What I'm For
- Released: June 23, 2008
- Genre: Country
- Length: 3:54 (album version)
- Label: BNA
- Songwriters: Marc Beeson; Danny Orton
- Producer: Dann Huff

Pat Green singles chronology
"Way Back Texas" (2007)	"Let Me" (2008)	"Country Star" (2009)

"Let Me" is a song written by Marc Beeson and Danny Orton, and recorded by American country music artist Pat Green. It was released in June 2008 as the lead-off single from his album What I'm For, which was released on January 27, 2009. The song peaked at #12 on the Billboard Hot Country Songs chart, becoming his second highest-charting single, behind 2003's "Wave on Wave", which peaked at #3.

== Content ==
"Let Me" is a mid-tempo ballad in which the narrator promises to offer emotional support to the one that he loves.

Describing the song in a cut-by-cut synopsis of the album on Sony BMG Nashville's website, Green said that he liked the melody of the chorus (which contains multiple repetitions of the same note). He also said that the song drew his attention because it was a love song that did not explicitly use the word "love".

== Critical reception ==
The song received a "thumbs down" review from the country music site Engine 145. Reviewer Brady Vercher criticized the song for being overproduced and trying to "garner radio success than pushing both [Green's and the producer's] boundaries to create something worthwhile." He also thought that vocally, Green got "lost" in the song and was unable to add any personality to the delivery. Washington Post critic Chris Richards said that Green's vocal delivery did not "sit right" in the "slow-burn" of the song, and Joey Guerra of the Houston Chronicle called it "stock country loverboy stuff."

== Chart performance ==
Chart (2008–2009)	Peak position
US Hot Country Songs (Billboard)	12
US Billboard Hot 100	81
