= Dixie Lullaby (song) =

Single by Pat Green

from the album Cannonball
- Released: October 28, 2006
- Genre: Country
- Length: 4:08
- Label: BNA
- Songwriters: Pat Green, Patrick Davis, Justin Pollard
- Producers: Don Gehman, Justin Pollard

Pat Green singles chronology
| "Feels Just Like It Should" (2006) | "Dixie Lullaby" (2006) | "Way Back Texas" (2007) |

"Dixie Lullaby" is a song by American country music artist Pat Green. It was released in October 2006 as the second single from the album Cannonball. The song reached #24 on the Billboard Hot Country Songs chart. Green wrote the song, along with Patrick Davis and Justin Pollard.

== Critical reception ==
A review by Kevin John Coyne of countryuniverse.net stated:

Memories of childhood are specific to each individual person, yet somehow the more specific they're described in the song, the more universal they feel when listening to them. Green's romanticizing of his own childhood culminates in a eulogy for his father that is all the heartbreaking because of his rough delivery.

== Music video ==
The music video was directed by Trey Fanjoy.

It premiered on CMT on November 30, 2006.

== Chart performance ==
| Chart (2006–2007) | Peak poaition |
|---|---|
| US Hot Country Songs (Billboard) | 24 |
