= Wave on Wave =

Studio album by Pat Green
- Released: July 15, 2003
- Recorded: 2002–3 at Pedernales Studio, Spicewood, Texas; "Wave on Wave" recorded at Cartee-Day Studio, Nashville, Tennessee
- Genre: Country
- Length: 54:02
- Label: Universal South
- Producer: Tony Brown (track 4), Don Gehman (all tracks except 4), Doug Morris (track 4)

Pat Green chronology
Three Days (2001)	Wave on Wave (2003)	Lucky Ones (2004)

Singles from Wave on Wave
- 1. "Wave on Wave" Released: May 26, 2003; 2. "Guy Like Me" Released: December 27, 2003

Professional ratings
Review scores
Source	Rating
Allmusic	2/5 stars

Wave on Wave is the second studio album by American country music artist Pat Green. Released in 2003 on Universal/Republic Records in association with Mercury Records, it produced two singles for Green on the Billboard country charts. The title track, the first of these two singles, became Green's highest charting single, peaking at No. 3 on the country charts, while "A Guy Like Me" reached No. 31. Wave on Wave has been certified gold by the RIAA.

== Track listing ==
No.	Title	Writer(s)	Length
1.	"Guy Like Me"	Pat Green, David Neuhauser	3:30
2.	"Poetry"	Davis Raines, Walt Wilkins	4:03
3.	"Wrapped"	Green, Wilkins	3:28
4.	"Wave on Wave"	Green, Neuhauser, Justin Pollard	4:04
5.	"California"	Green	4:29
6.	"Sing 'Til I Stop Crying" (featuring Waylon Payne)	Green, Waylon Payne	3:55
7.	"All the Good Things Fade Away"	Green, Neuhauser	3:17
8.	"Run"	Green, Fil Easler	3:54
9.	"I'm Tired"	Green	4:05
10.	"Eden's Gate"	Green, Wilkins	3:58
11.	"Elvis" (featuring Willie Nelson, Ray Benson, Waylon Payne and Trish Murphy on harmony vocals)	Green, Stephen Harris, Payne	3:45
12.	"Barricades"	Green, Pollard	4:09
13.	"If I Was the Devil" (featuring Ray Wylie Hubbard on guitar and vocals)	Green	7:25

== Personnel ==
As listed in liner notes.

The Pat Green Band

- Pat Green - lead vocals, acoustic guitar, background vocals
- Brendon Anthony - violin
- Brett Danaher - electric guitar, baritone guitar, banjo
- Jondan McBride - acoustic guitar, 12-string guitar, tenor guitar, mandolin, harmony vocals
- David Neuhauser - electric guitar, acoustic guitar, baritone guitar, slide guitar, piano, Hammond B-3 organ, Wurlitzer
- Justin Pollard - drums, percussion
- Michael Tarabay - bass guitar

Special guest appearances

- Ray Benson - vocals on "Elvis"
- John Carroll - electric guitar on "Elvis"
- Chad Cromwell - drums on "Wave on Wave"
- Mike Daly - steel guitar, dobro
- Ray Wylie Hubbard - duet vocals and acoustic guitar on "If I was the Devil"
- John Jarvis - piano on "Wave on Wave"
- Trish Murphy - vocals on "Elvis"
- Willie Nelson - vocals on "Elvis"
- Sasha Ostrovsky - steel guitar on "Wave on Wave"
- Waylon Payne - acoustic guitar and vocals on "Elvis", duet vocals on "Sing 'Til I Can't Stop Crying"
- Brent Rowan - electric guitar on "Wave on Wave"
- Walt Wilkins - acoustic guitar and background vocals on "Wrapped"
- Curtis Wright - background vocals on "Wave on Wave"

== Chart performance ==
=== Weekly charts ===
Chart (2003)	Peak position
US Billboard 200	10
US Top Country Albums (Billboard)	2

=== Year-end charts ===
Chart (2003)	Position
US Top Country Albums (Billboard)	32
Chart (2004)	Position
US Top Country Albums (Billboard)	60

== Certifications ==
Region	Certification
United States (RIAA)	Gold
