= Wave on Wave (song) =

Single by Pat Green

from the album Wave on Wave
- Released: May 26, 2003
- Genre: Country
- Length: 3:59 (single edit); 4:04 (album version)
- Label: Universal South
- Songwriters: Pat Green; David Neuhauser; Justin Pollard
- Producers: Tony Brown; Doug Morris

Pat Green singles chronology
"Three Days" (2002)	"Wave on Wave" (2003)	"Guy Like Me" (2003)

"Wave on Wave" is a song recorded by American country music artist Pat Green. It was released in May 2003 as the first single and title track from his album of the same name. It reached #3 on Billboard's Hot Country Songs chart in the United States, and peaked at #39 on the Billboard Hot 100. It became his first and, to date, only Top 10 hit. The song was written by Green, David Neuhauser and Justin Pollard.

"Wave on Wave" was named Country Song of the Year by the Society of European Stage Authors & Composers (SESAC) in 2003. In addition, it was honored by Broadcast Music Incorporated (BMI) for one million spins on radio. "Wave on Wave" was also nominated for a Grammy Award in 2004 for Best Country Song. The song has sold 450,000 copies in the U.S. as of October 2014.

== As event music ==
The song was featured during campaign rallies for then-U.S. President George W. Bush during his 2004 reelection campaign. It is currently used by the Washington Nationals during their "Wave your caps" salute. "Wave On Wave" was performed at halftime on the University of Iowa Football Team's home field, Kinnick Stadium, at halftime of the Hawkeye game versus Northern Iowa. Pat Green and a combined ensemble of performers from the University of Iowa Hawkeye Marching Band and the University of Northern Iowa Panther Marching Band joined together to perform the song at halftime. The University of Iowa Football team plays the song during "The Wave," a tradition of turning toward the University of Iowa Stead Family Children's Hospital at the end of the first quarter to wave at the child patients and their families.

== Chart positions ==
"Wave on Wave" debuted at number 57 on the U.S. Billboard Hot Country Singles & Tracks for the week of May 31, 2003.

Chart (2003)	Peak position
US Hot Country Songs (Billboard)	3
US Billboard Hot 100	39

=== Year-end charts ===
Chart (2003)	Position
US Country Songs (Billboard)	39
