= Cory Morrow =

American singer-songwriter

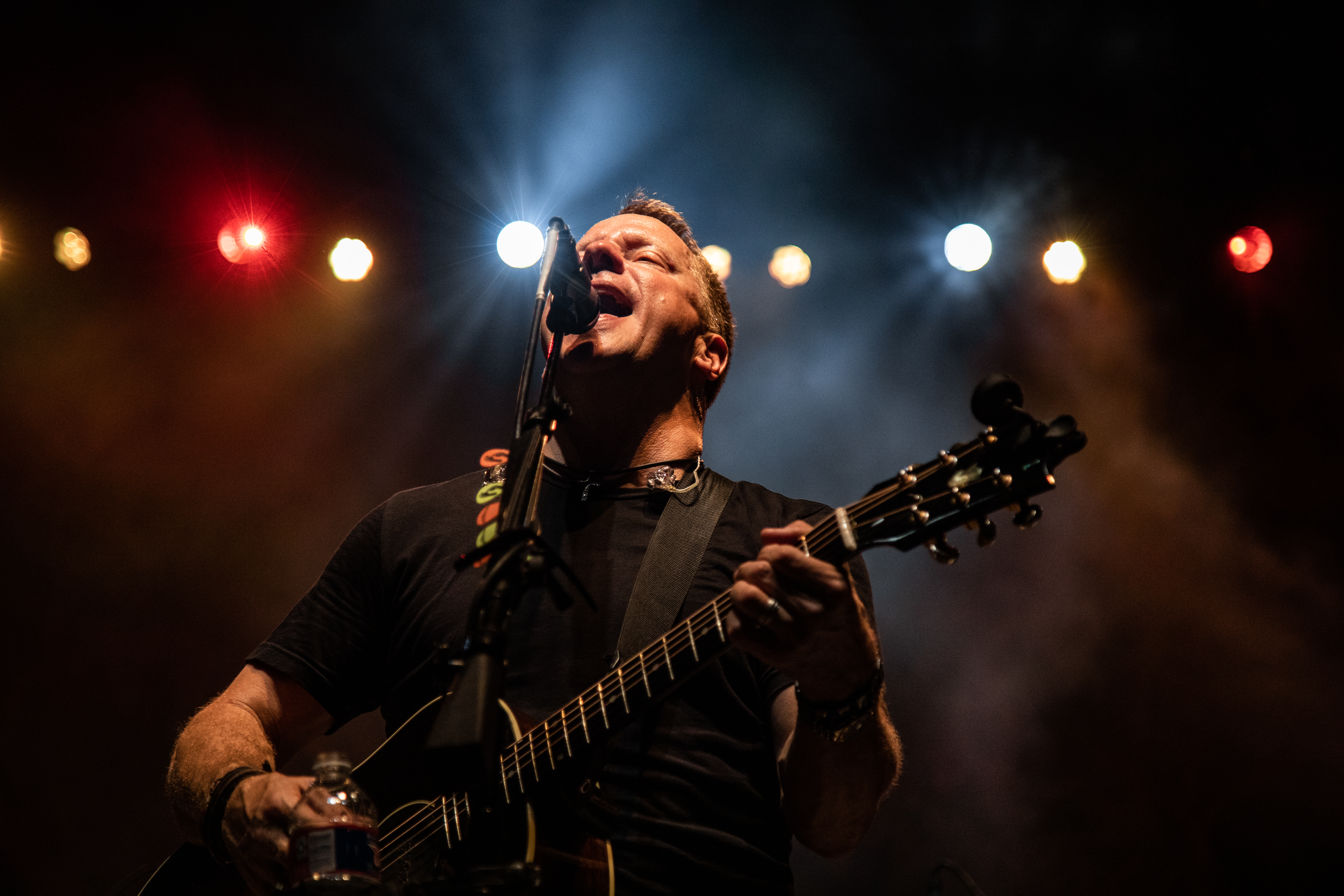
- Morrow performing at Whitewater Amphitheater in 2019

Background information
- Born: May 1, 1972 (age 53)
- Origin: Houston, Texas, United States
- Genres: Country
- Occupation: Singer-songwriter
- Instrument(s): Vocals, guitar
- Years active: 1997–present
- Labels: WriteOn; Greenhorse; Smith Entertainment; Sustain; APEX/WriteOn
- Website: corymorrow.com

Cory Morrow (born May 1, 1972, in Houston, Texas) is a Texas Country singer-songwriter.

== Biography ==
Morrow was born May 1, 1972, in Houston, Texas. He started playing guitar at Memorial High School in Houston and continued to develop as a musician while attending Texas Tech University.

In 1993, Morrow moved to Austin, Texas, to pursue music as a career. Morrow has sold over 200,000 albums independently. Morrow's 2002 release Outside the Lines reached No. 28 on Billboard's Country Album chart, No. 3 on the magazine's Internet Sales chart, No. 8 on its Independent Album chart and No. 16 on Heatseekers chart. SoundScan ranked him No. 7 among "country debut artists" that year.

== Discography ==
=== Albums ===
Year	Album	Chart Positions		Label
Year	Album	US Country	US Heat	Label
1997	Texas Time Travelin' EP			Write On
1997	The Cory Morrow Band			Write On
1998	The Man That I've Been			Write On
2001	Double Exposure: Live			Write On
2001	Songs We Wish We'd Written (w/ Pat Green)	26	20	Greenhorse/Write On
2002	Outside the Lines	28		Write On
2003	Full Exposure Live	40	30	Write On
2005	Nothing Left to Hide	42	24	Smith Entertainment/Write On
2007	Live From Austin TX			New West Records
2007	Ten Years			Sustain/Universal/Write On
2008	Vagrants & Kings	45	38	Sustain/Universal/Write On
2010	Ramblin' Man EP			APEX/Write On
2010	Brand New Me	49	20	APEX/Write On
2012	Live at Billy Bob's Texas	66	39	Billy Bob's Texas
2015	The Good Fight	45	19	Write On/Thirty Tigers
2018	Whiskey And Pride			Write On

=== Singles ===
Year	Single	Peak positions	Album
Year	Single	US Country	Album
2001	"Texas on My Mind" (with Pat Green)	60	Songs We Wish We'd Written
2005	"Beat of Your Heart"	59	Nothing Left to Hide
2010	"Ramblin' Man"	—	Ramblin' Man EP
2010	"Brand New Me"	—	Brand New Me
2011	"Lead Me On"	—	Brand New Me
2012	"Hold Us Together"	—	Live at Billy Bob's Texas
"—" denotes releases that did not chart

=== Music videos ===
Year	Video	Director
2008	"He Carries Me"	Jim Shea
2018	"Whiskey and Pride"	
