= Cannonball (album) =

Studio album by Pat Green
- Released: August 22, 2006
- Genre: Country
- Length: 53:20
- Label: BNA
- Producer: Don Gehman; Justin Pollard

Pat Green chronology
Lucky Ones (2004)	Cannonball (2006)	What I'm For (2009)

Singles from Cannonball
- 1. "Feels Just Like It Should" Released: May 16, 2006; 2. "Dixie Lullaby" Released: October 9, 2006; 3. "Way Back Texas" Released: July 2, 2007

Professional ratings
Review scores
Source	Rating
Allmusic	3/5 stars

Cannonball is the fourth studio album by American country music artist Pat Green. It was released in 2006 (see 2006 in country music) as his first album for BNA Records. This album produced three singles for him on the Billboard Hot Country Songs charts: "Feels Just Like It Should" at No. 13, "Dixie Lullaby" at No. 24, and "Way Back Texas" at No. 28.

== Track listing ==
No.	Title	Writer(s)	Length
1.	"Cannonball"	Pat Green, Patrick Davis, Brett Danaher, Justin Pollard	3:59
2.	"Way Back Texas"	Craig Wiseman, Wendell Mobley	4:07
3.	"Love Like That"	Davis, Pollard	3:49
4.	"Dixie Lullaby"	Green, Davis, Pollard	4:08
5.	"Feels Just Like It Should"	Green, Pollard, Brett James	3:47
6.	"Missing Me"	Green, Pollard, Casey Beathard	3:28
7.	"Virginia Belle"	Chris Masterson, Pollard	3:16
8.	"Finder's Keepers" (duet with Sara Evans)	Green, Matraca Berg	4:06
9.	"Won't Let Love"	Davis, Pollard	3:52
10.	"Lost Without You"	Green, James	3:49
11.	"I'm Trying to Find It"	Jeffrey Steele, Tom Hambridge	4:07
12.	"Love Had Something to Say"	Radney Foster	3:46
13.	"Learn How to Live"	Green, Pollard, David Neuhauser	3:26
14.	"Sleeping with the Lights On"	Green, Masterson	3:43

== Personnel ==
- Pat Green – lead vocals, background vocals, acoustic guitar
- J. T. Corenflos – electric guitar
- Michael Daly – steel guitar
- Sara Evans – duet vocals on "Finder's Keepers"
- Kenny Greenberg – electric guitar
- John Hobbs – piano, Hammond organ
- Greg Morrow – drums
- Herb Pedersen – background vocals
- Justin Andrew Pollard – percussion, tambourine
- Michael Rhodes – bass guitar
- Biff Watson – acoustic guitar
- John Willis – acoustic guitar
- Jonathan Yudkin – violin, banjo, strings

== Chart performance ==
=== Album ===
Chart (2006)	Peak position
U.S. Billboard Top Country Albums	2
U.S. Billboard 200	20
