= Itasca, Texas =

- City
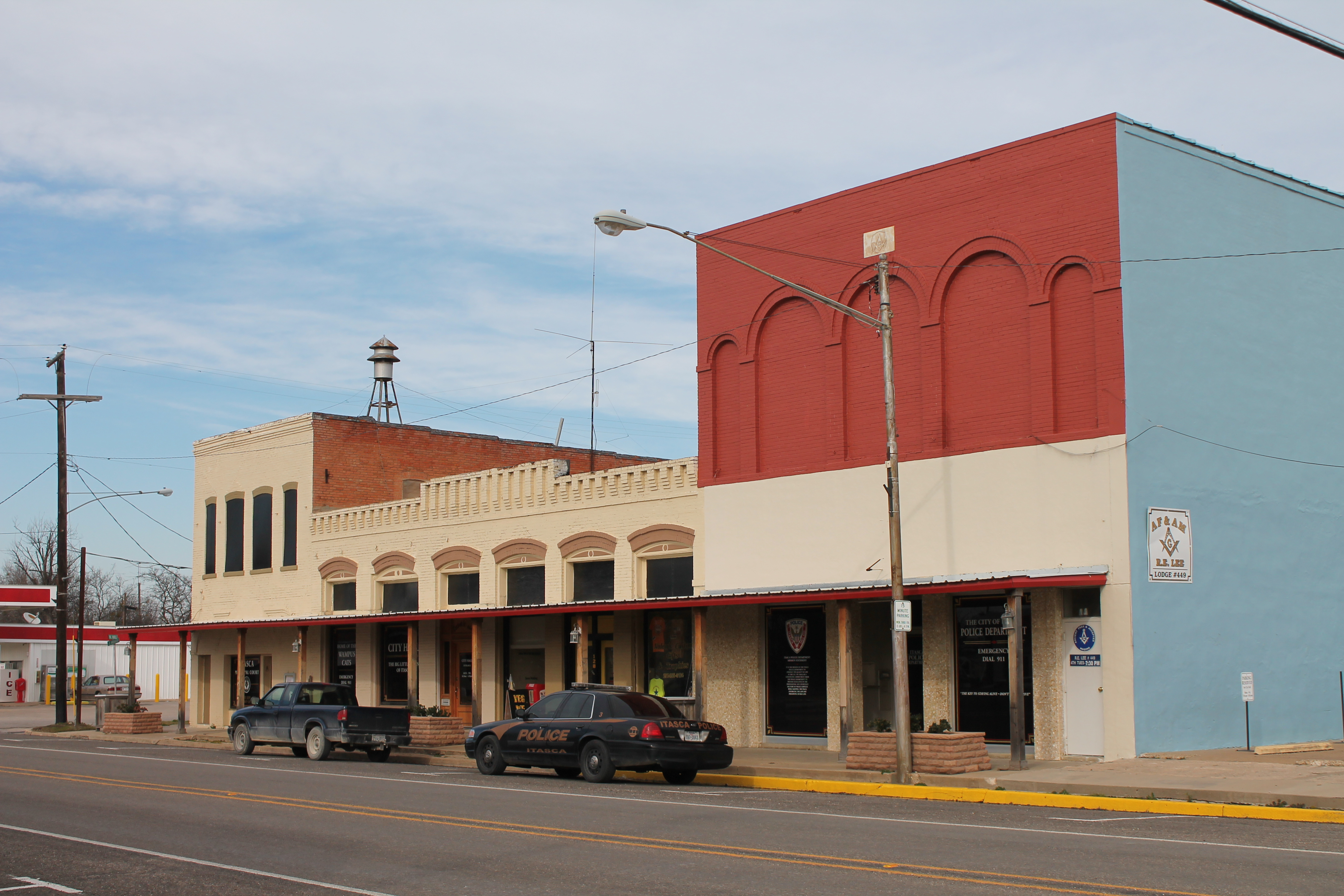
- Motto: "The Big Little Town"
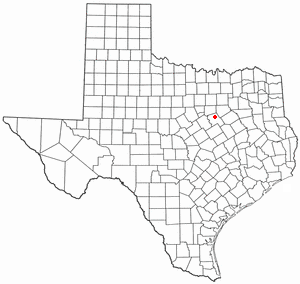
- Location of Itasca, Texas

- Coordinates: 32°09′31″N 97°08′52″W
- Country: United States
- State: Texas
- County: Hill

Area
  - Total: 1.24 sq mi (3.21 km^{2})
  - Land: 1.24 sq mi (3.21 km^{2})
  - Water: 0 sq mi (0.00 km^{2})
- Elevation: 689 ft (210 m)

Population (2020)
  - Total: 1,562
  - Density: 1,260/sq mi (487/km^{2})
- Time zone: UTC-6 (Central (CST))
  - Summer (DST): UTC-5 (CDT)
- ZIP code: 76055
- Area code: 254
- FIPS code: 48-37084
- GNIS feature ID: 2410124
- Website: www.cityofitasca.net

Itasca /aɪˈtæskə/ eye-TAS-kə is a city in Hill County in Northern Central Texas, United States. As of the 2020 census, the city population was 1,562.

== History ==
Itasca began as a railroad station for the Missouri, Kansas and Texas Railroad in 1881, and was incorporated in 1885.

In the 1984 Willie Nelson film Songwriter, Willie's character mentions as a joke that he's going to "a weavers convention in Itasca, Texas".

== Geography ==
According to the United States Census Bureau, the city has a total area of 1.2 square miles (3.1 km^{2}), all land. The town's theme seen on some of its signs and its website is the "Big Little Town." Located off I-35W, south of Fort Worth, and north of Waco, Itasca is the approximate midway point between the two cities.

=== Climate ===
The climate in this area is characterized by hot, humid summers and generally mild to cool winters. According to the Köppen Climate Classification system, Itasca has a humid subtropical climate, abbreviated "Cfa" on climate maps.

== Demographics ==
Historical population
Census	Pop.	Note	%±
1890	548		—
1900	1,277		133.0%
1910	1,356		6.2%
1920	1,599		17.9%
1930	1,665		4.1%
1940	1,759		5.6%
1950	1,718		−2.3%
1960	1,383		−19.5%
1970	1,483		7.2%
1980	1,600		7.9%
1990	1,523		−4.8%
2000	1,503		−1.3%
2010	1,644		9.4%
2020	1,562		−5.0%
U.S. Decennial Census

=== 2020 census ===
As of the 2020 census, Itasca had a population of 1,562 residents and 363 families residing in the city. The median age was 37.5 years, 26.1% of residents were under the age of 18, and 16.4% of residents were 65 years of age or older. For every 100 females there were 94.5 males, and for every 100 females age 18 and over there were 91.1 males age 18 and over.

0.0% of residents lived in urban areas, while 100.0% lived in rural areas.

There were 537 households in Itasca, of which 40.4% had children under the age of 18 living in them. Of all households, 50.5% were married-couple households, 16.9% were households with a male householder and no spouse or partner present, and 26.1% were households with a female householder and no spouse or partner present. About 22.5% of all households were made up of individuals and 10.8% had someone living alone who was 65 years of age or older.

There were 619 housing units, of which 13.2% were vacant. The homeowner vacancy rate was 3.1% and the rental vacancy rate was 11.1%.

Racial composition as of the 2020 census
Race	Number	Percent
White	831	53.2%
Black or African American	187	12.0%
American Indian and Alaska Native	18	1.2%
Asian	10	0.6%
Native Hawaiian and Other Pacific Islander	0	0.0%
Some other race	305	19.5%
Two or more races	211	13.5%
Hispanic or Latino (of any race)	629	40.3%

=== 2000 census ===
As of the census of 2000, there were 1,503 people, 549 households, and 384 families residing in the city. The population density was 1,242.9 inhabitants per square mile (479.9/km^{2}). There were 612 housing units at an average density of 506.1 per square mile (195.4/km^{2}). The racial makeup of the city was 64.54% White, 17.03% African American, 0.47% Native American, 0.07% Asian, 16.10% from other races, and 1.80% from two or more races. Hispanic or Latino of any race were 26.41% of the population.

There were 549 households, out of which 32.6% had children under the age of 18 living with them, 51.0% were married couples living together, 13.7% had a female householder with no husband present, and 29.9% were non-families. 25.3% of all households were made up of individuals, and 13.1% had someone living alone who was 65 years of age or older. The average household size was 2.63 and the average family size was 3.17.

In the city, the population was spread out, with 26.2% under the age of 18, 10.0% from 18 to 24, 26.3% from 25 to 44, 19.4% from 45 to 64, and 18.1% who were 65 years of age or older. The median age was 36 years. For every 100 females, there were 98.3 males. For every 100 females age 18 and over, there were 97.3 males.

The median income for a household in the city was $30,050, and the median income for a family was $34,241. Males had a median income of $26,200 versus $22,045 for females. The per capita income for the city was $13,443. About 15.2% of families and 20.0% of the population were below the poverty line, including 29.6% of those under age 18 and 17.2% of those age 65 or over.

== Education ==
The city is served by the Itasca Independent School District. The district has three schools, Itasca High School, Itasca Middle School, and Itasca Elementary School.
