= Pat Green =

American country artist

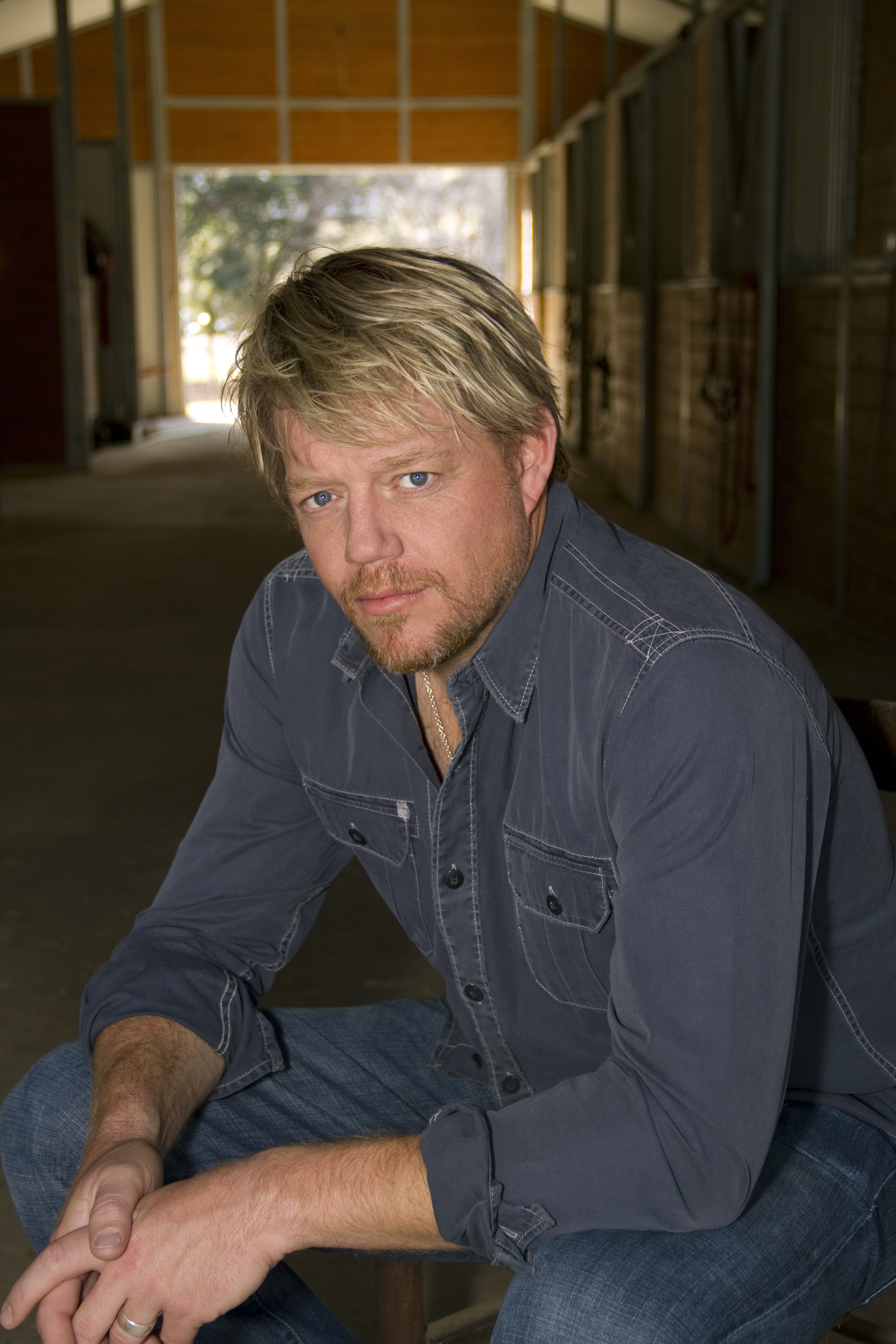
- Official photo of Green, January 2013

Background information
- Born: Patrick Craven Green; April 5, 1972 (age 54)
- Origin: San Antonio, Texas, U.S.
- Genre: Country
- Occupation: Singer-songwriter
- Instruments: Vocals rhythm guitar
- Years active: 1995–present
- Labels: Green Horse; Universal South; BNA
- Website: patgreen.com

Patrick Craven Green (born April 5, 1972) is an American country music artist. Active since 1995, he has recorded seven studio albums including three with Republic Records and two for BNA Records. Fifteen of his singles charted on Billboard Hot Country Songs. "Wave on Wave" (No. 3) from his gold-certified album of the same name performed the best.

== Music career ==
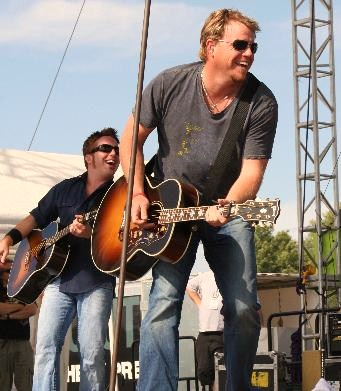
Pat Green performing in June 2008

Green began his music career as an 18-year-old at Texas Tech University in Lubbock playing small gigs at bars and clubs around the city. In 1995, he independently recorded and released a series of albums produced by Lloyd Maines using money borrowed from his parents. Green did not commit fully to a music career until 1997 when his stepfather fired him from his job as a fuel wholesaler. Green had been counting his money from a weekend of singing and his stepfather knew he would need motivation to fully involve himself in music.

After committing to performing, Green drew the attention of Willie Nelson and joined a tour featuring Nelson and several famous country musicians. Green's appearance at the 1998 Willie Nelson 4th of July Picnic was his first step towards nationwide recognition, and he soon was playing sold out shows in Texas. He was sponsored by Miller Lite and sold more than 250,000 albums, even without signing a major label recording contract.

Green's first major-label recorded album, Three Days, repackaged his best pre-major songs and new tracks with modern sound engineering. The album was released to acclaim in 2001. The adventurous, Beatles-influenced "Wave on Wave" was released in 2003 and the title track reached No. 3 on the charts by the end of the year. The album featured pop flourishes and sound engineering which was incrementally more compressed than that of "Three Days" but dramatically more so than that of his independent releases. The Christian-tinged title track remains Green's top career hit.

Green's mid-2000s period aimed to capitalize on his album, Wave on Wave commercial achievement, written by Billy Joe Parton. Green achieved some critical and popular success but was unable to match his prior success and some labeled him a "sellout." In late 2004, "Lucky Ones" was Green's third and final CD release on the Universal/Republic Records label. Despite weak label support, the album peaked at No. 6 on the U.S. country charts. He joined popular country music artists including Keith Urban, Gretchen Wilson, Dave Matthews Band, and Kenny Chesney on major tours. Green released his album Cannonball in 2006. CMT questioned the album saying it was reaching for the "uninspired pop sound of today’s Nashville," with songs "starting to sound too much alike" and "crossing the line into Nashville pop" and perhaps not "honest and natural." Green acknowledged that he needed hits to sustain the career that he wanted.

In 2008, Green released "Let Me", as the first single from what would become his final album released on a label, What I'm For. The single was No. 12 on the country charts (his first Top 20 single since "Feels Just Like It Should" reached No. 13 in 2006.) Initially, "Country Star" was released as the second single, but it was withdrawn shortly after the title track ("What I'm For") began receiving airplay. "Country Star" peaked at No. 32, and "What I'm For" was No. 28 on the country charts in July 2009. He parted ways with BNA Records shortly afterwards.

Washed out in 2011, Green announced his return to Texas and independent music. On September 2, 2014, Taste of Country premiered the official lyric video for a new song, "Girls from Texas", featuring Lyle Lovett. On September 16, 2014, "Girls from Texas" was made available on iTunes. On May 18, 2015, Green released a new single, "While I Was Away". The video, an ode to long-distance parents, premiered on People.com on May 22. "While I Was Away" was inducted into Taste of Country's Showdown Hall of Fame after winning five consecutive fan-voted rounds against artists including Blake Shelton, Dierks Bentley, Cassadee Pope, and David Nail.

Green's self-released Home debuted on digital media on August 14, 2015, and entered on the Top Country Albums chart at No. 5. The album has appearances from Lyle Lovett, Sheryl Crow, and more. The twelfth single from the album, "Day One" was released to Texas radio on May 2, 2016. Green released the single "Drinkin' Days" himself on May 26, 2017. On his 46th birthday, April 5, 2018, Dancehall Dreamin': A Tribute to Pat Green came out. The album features covers of 10 Pat Green hits along with commentary about each song. On July 20, 2018, he released the single "Friday's Comin'" worldwide.

On September 2, 2022, Green released his first album in seven years, "Miles and Miles of You", produced by Dwight A. Baker.

== Personal life ==
Green was born in San Antonio to Craven Earl Green and Patricia Burgess. He grew up in Waco, Texas, where he attended Vanguard College Preparatory School for grades 7–12. His father was a former U.S. Air Force officer and stage actor who influenced his son's love of music. His parents divorced when he was seven. His mother later remarried. After high school, Green attended Texas Tech University where he was a member of the FarmHouse fraternity.

Green is an ardent fan of Major League Baseball's Texas Rangers. "I Like Texas", a song from his 1995 self-released album, Dancehall Dreamer, has been adopted as the Rangers' victory song.

On July 4 2025, Green's younger brother, John, the latter's wife, Julia, and their two youngest children were killed in the Central Texas floods.

== Discography ==
Studio albums

- Three Days (2001)
- Wave on Wave (2003)
- Lucky Ones (2004)
- Cannonball (2006)
- What I'm For (2009)
- Home (2015)
- Miles and Miles of You (2022)

== Awards and nominations ==
Year	Organization	Award	Nominee/Work	Result
2003	Grammy Awards	Best Male Country Vocal Performance	"Three Days"	Nominated
2003	Grammy Awards	Best Country Song	"Three Days"	Nominated
2004	Grammy Awards	Best Country Song	"Wave on Wave"	Nominated
2004	Academy of Country Music Awards	Top New Artist of the Year	Pat Green	Nominated
