= List of Garth Brooks concert tours =

List of concerts by American country music singer Garth Brooks

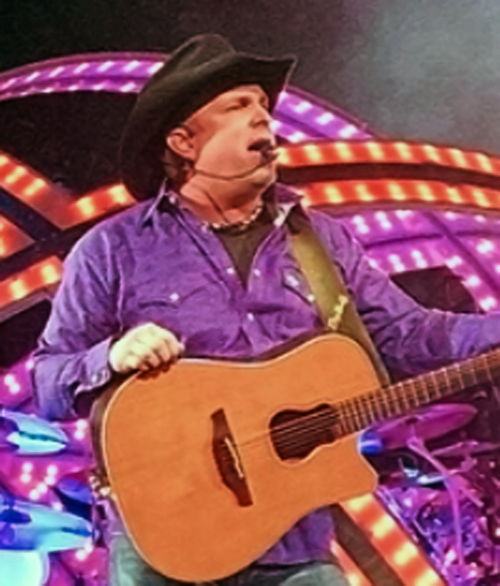
Garth Brooks performing during The Garth Brooks World Tour (2014–2017).

American country music singer Garth Brooks has embarked on six major concert tours, two concert residencies, and numerous specialized, benefit, and promotional concert events throughout his career. Brooks launched his first headlining tour, the Ropin' the Wind Tour, in 1991, followed by his first international venture, The Garth Brooks World Tour (1993–1994). His 1996–1998 World Tour became one of the highest-attended concert tours of the 1990s, concluding with a free concert in New York City's Central Park that drew an estimated 980,000 attendees.

Following his retirement from touring in 2001, Brooks returned to periodic live performances with his first Las Vegas concert residency, Garth at Wynn (2009–2014). He resumed touring with The Garth Brooks World Tour (2014–2017), a 390 show arena run with Trisha Yearwood that ranks among the highest-attended tours by a single artist in North American history. Brooks then toured football venues with The Garth Brooks Stadium Tour (2018–2022) and completed his second Las Vegas residency, Garth Brooks/Plus One, at The Colosseum at Caesars Palace in 2024. In 2026, he launched The Blame It All On My Roots Tour, returning to arena performances.

Throughout his touring career, Brooks has maintained a distinct ticketing model characterized by flat-rate pricing, all-inclusive admission fees, and multi-night venue stays to accommodate consumer demand. His concert ventures have established multiple ticket sales and attendance records across arena and stadium venues worldwide.

== Concert tours ==
Year(s)	Title	Duration	Number of performances
1991–1992	Ropin' the Wind Tour	February 1, 1991 – December 12, 1992	–
Starting in February 1991, the Ropin' the Wind Tour was Brooks's inaugural headlining tour, supporting his third album, Ropin' the Wind. Spanning through December 1992 across North America, the tour established his arena production setup and physical stage presence. Two performances at Reunion Arena in Dallas were filmed for his debut NBC television special, This Is Garth Brooks.
1993–1994	The Garth Brooks World Tour	January 29, 1993 – October 11, 1994	102
Launched in support of his fifth studio album, In Pieces, Brooks's first extensive international tour spanned over 100 performances across North America, Europe, Oceania, and South America. Running from January 1993 to October 1994, the tour featured a combination of arenas and outdoor venues, with an expanded staging setup that included pyrotechnic displays and elevated platforms. A September 1993 performance at Texas Stadium in Dallas was filmed and broadcast on NBC as the television special This Is Garth Brooks, Too!
1996–1998	The Garth Brooks World Tour	March 12, 1996 – November 22, 1998	344
Brooks began his second world tour, supporting the album Fresh Horses, in 1996. His album, Sevens, was also released a year into the tour. While the tour did not visit as many countries as Brooks' first, domestic tickets were in extremely high demand, breaking many attendance records and prompting additional shows to be added for nearly every city. It went on to be ranked among the highest-grossing concert tours of the decade, and was Brooks' final concert world tour before his retirement in 2001.
2014–2017	The Garth Brooks World Tour	September 4, 2014 – December 23, 2017	390
Starting in September 2014, The World Tour marked Brooks' return to arena touring after a 16 year hiatus. Co-headlining with Trisha Yearwood in support of Man Against Machine and Gunslinger, the 390 show run featured multi-night arena stays, occasionally with multiple shows in a single day. Driven by flat-rate ticket prices, the tour concluded in December 2017 with over 6.3 million tickets sold, ranking among the most attended concert tours.
2018–2022	The Garth Brooks Stadium Tour	October 20, 2018 – September 17, 2022	42
Beginning unofficially in October 2018 at Notre Dame Stadium and running through September 2022, The Stadium Tour featured Brooks performing exclusively at North American football stadiums and international venues. The tour featured an in-the-round center stage setup. Tickets were sold at a flat rate, continuing Brooks' practice of capping admission costs regardless of seat location. Despite postponement in 2020 and 2021 due to the COVID-19 pandemic, the 42 show run broke single-night attendance records at nearly every stop, concluding with a five night sellout at Croke Park in Dublin, Ireland, which drew over 3 million attendees.
2026	The Blame It All On My Roots Tour	August 20, 2026 – present	?
Launching in August 2026 at Gainbridge Fieldhouse in Indianapolis, the Blame It All On My Roots Tour marks Brooks' return to indoor arena shows. Designed to emulate the staging of his 1996–1998 World Tour, the production incorporates an in-the-round setup, alongside his signature suspended drum pod. Operating with the same flat-rate ticket pricing, a selection of the tour's performances will also be recorded for Brooks' upcoming live album project, Killer Live.
2026	The Garth Brooks Irish Tour	May 21, 2027 – June 19, 2027	10
In November 2026, Brooks announced The Garth Brooks Irish Tour, initially as ten concerts scheduled for May and June 2027. The schedule comprises two shows each in Belfast, Galway, Kilkenny, Limerick, and Cork.

== Concert residencies ==
Year(s)	Title	Duration	Number of performances
2009–14	Garth at Wynn	December 11, 2009 – January 4, 2014	186
Beginning in December 2009, Garth at Wynn marked Brooks's return to periodic live performance during his retirement from touring. Staged on select weekends at the Encore Theatre at Wynn Las Vegas, the residency featured an acoustic format highlighting Brooks's musical influences, alongside guest appearances by Trisha Yearwood. To accommodate his family commitments in Oklahoma, Steve Wynn provided Brooks private air transportation. The residency concluded in January 2014, and its core concept served as the foundation for Brooks' box set, Blame It All on My Roots: Five Decades of Influences.
2023–24	Garth Brooks/Plus One	May 18, 2023 – July 13, 2024	72
Brooks announced his second concert residency, at The Colosseum at Caesars Palace in Las Vegas, on November 14, 2022 during an appearance on Good Morning America. The title, "Plus One", is a reference to the intimate format of the performances, however Brooks' band was also present at each show, joining him for certain songs. Uniquely, shows did not include a defined set list, allowing for spontaneous performances and audience interaction. The residency ran for 72 shows, sold 99% of available tickets, and ranks among the highest-grossing concert series at a single venue.

== Promotional tours ==
Year(s)	Title	Duration	Number of performances
2019–2021	Dive Bar Tour	July 15, 2019 – December 16, 2021	8
Launched in July 2019 in connection with his single "Dive Bar", the Dive Bar Tour was an eight show concert series hosted in small capacity "dive bar" venues across the United States. The tour ran alongside Brooks' Stadium Tour, with ticket access was restricted to local radio station giveaways. Following a delay due to the COVID-19 pandemic, the tour resumed in late 2021 and concluded in 2022.

== Benefit concerts ==
Year(s)	Title	Duration	Number of performances
2008	Garth Brooks: Live in LA	January 25, 2008 – January 26, 2008	5
In a fundraiser for the 2007 California wildfires relief efforts, Brooks performed five sold-out concerts at the Staples Center over a two-day period within 48 hours, becoming the first artist ever to accomplish such a feat in a limited amount of time...
2010	Garth Brooks' Flood Relief Concerts	December 16, 2010 – December 22, 2010	9
Brooks performed nine sold-out concerts at the Bridgestone Arena to raise money for the 2010 Tennessee floods relief efforts, with 100% of ticket sales going to charity. Originally scheduled to be one benefit concert, demand quickly prompted additional shows until 140,000 tickets were sold, nearly double Michael Jackson's long-standing Tennessee ticket sales record (72,000), and raised $3.5 million.
2013	Oklahoma Twister Relief Concert	July 6, 2013	1
Brooks returned to his home state of Oklahoma to raise money for the state's tornado relief efforts in a benefit concert at the Gaylord Family Oklahoma Memorial Stadium alongside Toby Keith, raising nearly $2 million.
2015	Garth in Brazil	August 22, 2015	1
While between legs of his third world tour, Brooks performed a sold-out concert in Barretos, Brazil to benefit the Hospital de Câncer de Barretos.

== Other concerts ==
Year(s)	Title	Duration	Number of performances
1997	Garth: Live from Central Park	August 7, 1997	1
The only New York City concert featured on Brooks 1996–98 world tour, Garth: Live from Central Park was a free concert held in New York City's Central Park. It featured special guests Billy Joel & Don McLean and had a total attendance of 980,000, making it the largest attendance concert ever held in central park history...
2007	Garth Brooks: Live in Kansas City	November 5, 2007 – November 14, 2007	9
While still officially retired, Brooks performed nine sold-out shows to commemorate the opening of Kansas City's Sprint Center. The concerts were Brooks' first performances since his 1996–98 world tour, and the finale was simulcast live via National CineMedia on more than 300 movie theaters throughout the United States.
2020	Garth Brooks: A Drive-In Concert Experience	June 27, 2020	1
During the COVID-19 pandemic, Brooks performed a concert broadcast at 300 drive-in theaters throughout North America.

== See also ==
- List of most-attended concert tours
- List of highest-grossing concert tours
