= The Garth Brooks World Tour (2014–2017) =

2014–17 concert tour by Garth Brooks

- Tour by Garth Brooks
- Promotional poster for the tour
- Associated album: Man Against Machine
- Start date: September 4, 2014
- End date: December 23, 2017
- Legs: 8
- No. of shows: 390 in North America
- Box office: 364.3 million (366 shows)

Garth Brooks concert chronology
- Garth at Wynn (2009–2014); World Tour (2014–2017); Stadium Tour (2019–2022)

The Garth Brooks World Tour was a concert tour by American singer Garth Brooks with Trisha Yearwood. Beginning on September 4, 2014, in Rosemont, Illinois, the tour was Brooks' first in 13 years after coming out of retirement. It launched in support of his 2014 album, Man Against Machine, continuing through the release of his 2016 album, Gunslinger.

High demand has prompted multiple concerts to be added in each city, with Brooks performing two shows per night in some cases. With 390 shows performed following the conclusion of its eighth leg in 2017, the tour has broken the record for the most all-time concerts in a tour.

== Conception ==
Garth Brooks' first and second world tours, 1993–1994 and 1996–1998 respectively, were both successful. After his multi-year residency at Wynn Las Vegas, yet not embarking on a multi-city tour for thirteen years, Brooks announced plans for a world tour during an interview on Good Morning America in December 2013. He later confirmed his tour and plans for an upcoming album during a press conference on July 11, 2014. On July 15, Brooks stated on his website that each city on the tour would be individually released, and the first concert would take place at the Allstate Arena in Rosemont, Illinois. Days later, Brooks announced ten additional shows, all at the same arena. Brooks has continued the pattern of announcing the next city every few weeks, both in an effort to generate excitement and urgency, as well as an attempt to combat ticket resale. The tour was in extremely high demand. Typically, two or three shows were announced in one market at a time, with more shows added based on real-time statistics of demand.

== Ticket sales and records ==
The Garth Brooks World Tour ticket sales records
City	Arena record	State record	Source
Chicago	Yes	No
Atlanta	Yes	No
Jacksonville	Yes	Yes
Lexington	Yes	No
Minneapolis	Yes	Yes
Greensboro	Yes	Yes
St. Louis	Yes	No
Little Rock	Yes	Yes
Tulsa	Yes	No
Pittsburgh	Yes	No
Detroit	Yes	Yes
Buffalo	Yes	No
Denver	Yes	No
Sacramento	Yes	No
Portland	Yes	Yes
State College	Yes	No
Omaha	Yes	Yes
Knoxville	Yes	No
Houston	Yes	No
New Orleans	Yes	Yes
Dallas	Yes	No
Phoenix	Yes	No
Salt Lake City	Yes	No
San Diego	Yes	No
Wichita	Yes	No
Sunrise	Yes	No
Baltimore	Yes	No
North Charleston	Yes	Yes
Raleigh	Yes	No
Hamilton	Yes	Yes
Ottawa	Yes	No
Des Moines	Yes	Yes
Fargo	Yes	No
Winnipeg	Yes	No
Calgary	Yes	No
Statistics updated as of December 2017.

For the first concerts of the tour (what would become an 11-show residency in Rosemont, Illinois), 180,000 tickets were sold within three hours, meriting comparison to Bruce Springsteen's 1999–2000 reunion tour comeback success. As the tour progressed, Ticketmaster began having issues handling the high demand for tickets. 53,000 tickets were sold for the Atlanta shows, despite fans waiting for more than two hours due to technical issues by the ticket distribution company.

Many arena's ticket sales records have been held by Brooks from his previous world tours; these have since been broken by Brooks again. The tour broke the record for most tickets sold for concerts in a single North American city (more than 201,000 tickets for a residency in Minneapolis). The same Minneapolis residency was also the most concerts held in a single city to date, featuring eleven shows. In January 2016, tickets went on sale for the tour's first stop in Canada, a five-show residency in Hamilton, Ontario. Having not performed in the country since 2012, the Hamilton concerts sold more tickets than Brooks' previous Canadian shows combined, breaking his ticket sales record for the entire province of Ontario.

=== Resale controversies ===
In keeping with Brooks' own tradition, each ticket sold for the tour is the same price, regardless of location in the venue. An issue that arose beginning with the first concerts on the tour has been high ticket resale prices. For example, tickets for the seven-show residency in Dallas were being resold online for an average price 21% higher than face value. Because of Ticketmaster's anti-resale policies, Brooks chose the company to be the official ticket sales company for the tour. Despite the optimism for a lack of extreme resale prices, Ticketmaster's partner resale sites and services began allowing individuals to sell marked-up tickets anyway. In the first weeks of the tour, Atlanta tickets were posted for sale on TicketsNow for as much as nearly 470% higher than face value (i.e. a $71.50 ticket being sold for $405). Brooks, a long-time proponent of banning increased price ticket resales, called out those marking up ticket prices, saying his ultimate goal is making concerts affordable regardless of seat location.

=== System crashes ===
Most venues featured on the tour opt for Ticketmaster as the only official ticket sales merchant. However, some venues have chosen to use either other companies, or their own ticket selling resource. High ticket demand has a pattern of causing stress on these alternative systems. On September 18, 2015 AXS, the merchant selling online tickets to Brooks' San Diego shows, became overwhelmed by demand for tickets and was forced to halt the sale; tickets were later sold the following week. A similar situation occurred on March 18, 2016 when Fargo, North Dakota's Fargodome independent ticket sales website crashed, prompting a later sales date as well.

=== Cancelled and rescheduled shows ===
Due to conflict with the 2015 Stanley Cup Finals, Brooks was forced to cancel all June 2015 concerts at the Amalie Arena in Tampa, Florida. These shows have not yet been rescheduled. In anticipation of the January 2016 United States blizzard, Brooks rescheduled two concerts at the Royal Farms Arena in Baltimore for the following weekend. Brooks was also forced to reschedule two concerts in October 2016 at the Amway Center in Orlando, Florida due to Hurricane Matthew. In anticipation of the storm, his Thursday and Friday night shows were moved to Saturday and Sunday afternoon. Brooks also announced three concerts in Croke Park, Dublin, Ireland, in early 2014. This was subsequently extended to five shows, which led to conflict between Aiken Promotions and Dublin City Council, who would only grant permission for three of the five shows. Brooks, committed to all five shows, subsequently cancelled all the Irish tour dates.

== Stage design ==
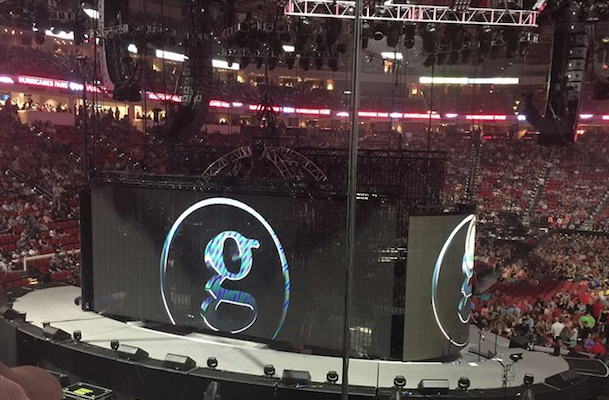
A large 4-sided video monitor encases the drummer's sphere prior to the concert; it is raised as the band makes their entrance.

Stage design for the world tour was directly influenced by Garth Brooks, stating his main interest in the show was to both "wow" the crowd while also keeping the central focus of the concert on the music itself. The lighting design by Bandit Lites was commissioned by David Butzler, Brooks' long-time lighting director.

Concerts are performed in an "end stage" setting, rather than a "theatre in the round" configuration; however, tickets are sold for all seats in the areas, including those located behind the stage.

Before the start of the third leg, the stage received some renovations including wing expansions and video screen redesign.

== Format and setlists ==
=== Show outline ===
Depending on the specific venue, the show begins with a performance from opening act and backing vocalist Karyn Rochelle. The stage consists of a large cube video monitor, featuring four sides showing Brooks' logo prior to the concert beginning. At the start, the cube is raised and Brooks appears as the first song is played. He begins his set, performing nearly all popular songs from his early albums. Yearwood then accompanies Brooks for a duet, followed by performing a select few of her songs. Brooks returns to perform additional songs, then two separate sets of encores.

=== Main set ===
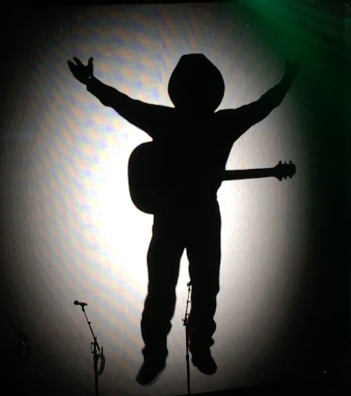
Brooks' silhouette as shown in the concert opening

As shown in the first legs of the tour, the first four songs are always the same. The concert begins with footage of Brooks' silhouette while singing the opening lines to the first song ("Man Against Machine" in the earlier shows, later replaced with "Baby, Let's Lay Down and Dance"). He then appears via elevator through the floor of the stage, pauses, and the bridge and final chorus are omitted and it transitions to "Rodeo", followed by "Two of a Kind, Workin' on a Full House", and "The Beaches of Cheyenne". Next, depending on the venue, other songs such as "The River", "Two Pina Coladas", "Papa Loved Mama", and "Ain't Goin' Down ('Til the Sun Comes Up)". "Unanswered Prayers" follows, with the audience singing the entire song with little accompaniment from Brooks. Additional songs, including "That Summer", "The Thunder Rolls", and "We Shall Be Free" may follow. Excluding the opening, Brooks only performs one or two songs from his newer albums (such as "Ask Me How I Know" or "Mom"). When questioned on his lack of new songs in the setlist, he remarked, "I'm just like you... I see the guys I like and I want to hear the old stuff."

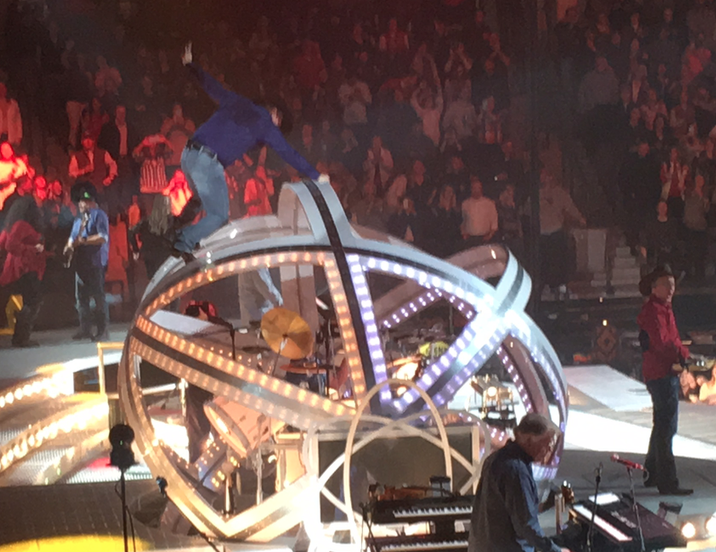
Brooks dances atop the drummer's sphere during "Ain't Goin' Down ('Til the Sun Comes Up)"

Brooks then begins singing "In Another's Eyes", as Trisha Yearwood enters the stage and performs the duet. Yearwood goes on to performs a select few of her songs, including "XXX's and OOO's (An American Girl)", "How Do I Live", "She's in Love with the Boy", and "Georgia Rain". Brooks then returns to sing "PrizeFighter" with Yearwood and transition back into his set. Additional songs performed by Brooks may include "Callin' Baton Rouge" and "Shameless". "Friends in Low Places" is then performed, followed by "The Dance" as the main set ends and the band departs from the stage.

=== Encores ===
At each concert, Brooks and crew return to the stage and perform "The Fever". Brooks dances on a conveyor belt as the drummer's sphere rises above the stage. Following the performance, the band leaves the stage once again. Brooks then returns, often unaccompanied, for what he dubs the "housekeeping segment", in which he scans the crowd for fans with signs requesting songs, performing them acoustically. In some instances (such as the Atlanta concerts in September 2014), he may also perform acoustic covers of songs like "Amarillo By Morning", "Night Moves", and "Piano Man". Regardless, the encore set commonly concludes with the band returning to perform "Much Too Young (To Feel This Damn Old)", or another classic song.

== Special performances and broadcasts ==
During the second concert of the tour in Rosemont, Illinois on September 5, 2014, Kelly Clarkson made a surprise appearance to perform the duet "PrizeFighter", alongside Yearwood (Brooks normally sings Clarkson's verses). Clarkson also made an appearance and sang the duet once again at the concert in Atlanta on September 19, 2014. Brooks made national headlines in November 2014 after noting a fan's sign at a concert in Minneapolis. The sign, reading "Chemo this morning. Garth tonight. Enjoying the dance.", caught Brooks' attention during his performance of "The Dance". After getting emotional, Brooks expressed his support. Later that same month, Brooks performed "People Loving People" on the American Music Awards of 2014 live via satellite from the concert in Greensboro, North Carolina. On the second to last concert of Brooks' six-night residency in Boston on January 25, 2015, Lee Brice joined him on stage and the two performed "More Than a Memory". Brice also opened for Brooks during his first show in Bossier City on July 29, 2016 and again performed the duet during Brooks' set.

At a Pittsburgh concert on February 7, 2015, Brooks' birthday, Pittsburgh Steelers' coach Mike Tomlin, as well as players Ben Roethlisberger, Cameron Heyward, Heath Miller, and Brett Keisel joined Brooks on stage, singing "Happy Birthday" and presenting him a jersey.

On November 10, 2016 a concert special showcasing the tour's shows from Yankee Stadium aired in 4K exclusively through AT&T and DirecTV on Audience.

== Critical response ==
Ray Waddell of Billboard noted the tours imminent success, saying Brooks could generate "more than double U2's attendance record" on their U2 360° Tour (the all-time highest-grossing concert tour). Commenting on the show itself, Jon Bream of the Star Tribune described it as "all about Garth being Garth, being humble and hammy, sincere and silly, romantic and rowdy — and making the fans believe that he's having as much fun as they are." Melissa Ruggieri of The Atlanta Journal-Constitution noted Brooks' skill of "toggling between the barn burning slickness of 'Ain't Goin' Down ('Til the Sun Comes Up)' and the restrained acoustic beauty of 'Unanswered Prayers'."

Commenting on Brooks' return to his native state of Oklahoma, Brandy McDonnell of The Oklahoman remarked "the frenzied audience nearly drowned out Brooks' stellar band on several occasions." She later stated, "[Brooks'] talent and zeal as an entertainer remain unmatched." Also following a concert in the tour's second leg, Francie Swidler of The Denver Post stated, "Brooks seemed to want to make everyone in the arena to feel special, fan or not", noting that Brooks "made it all look effortless". After Brooks' 8-concert stint in Houston, Chris Gray of the Houston Press summarized the concert by saying, "Combine raw adrenaline, effortless showmanship, grade-A musical smarts, flawless execution, and enough heart to power the CenterPoint substation across the street from Toyota Center, and you’ve got a performer for whom there's no such thing as too much hype."

== Tour dates ==
List of concerts, showing date, number of shows, city, country, and venue
Date Number of shows	City	Country	Venue
North America Leg 1
September 4, 2014	Rosemont	United States	Allstate Arena
September 5, 2014; 2 shows	Rosemont	United States	Allstate Arena
September 6, 2014; 2 shows	Rosemont	United States	Allstate Arena
September 11, 2014	Rosemont	United States	Allstate Arena
September 12, 2014; 2 shows	Rosemont	United States	Allstate Arena
September 13, 2014; 2 shows	Rosemont	United States	Allstate Arena
September 14, 2014	Rosemont	United States	Allstate Arena
September 19, 2014; 2 shows	Atlanta	United States	Philips Arena
September 20, 2014; 2 shows	Atlanta	United States	Philips Arena
September 21, 2014	Atlanta	United States	Philips Arena
September 26, 2014	Atlanta	United States	Philips Arena
September 27, 2014	Atlanta	United States	Philips Arena
October 10, 2014	Jacksonville	United States	Jacksonville Veterans Memorial Arena
October 11, 2014	Jacksonville	United States	Jacksonville Veterans Memorial Arena
October 12, 2014	Jacksonville	United States	Jacksonville Veterans Memorial Arena
October 16, 2014	Jacksonville	United States	Jacksonville Veterans Memorial Arena
October 17, 2014	Jacksonville	United States	Jacksonville Veterans Memorial Arena
October 18, 2014	Jacksonville	United States	Jacksonville Veterans Memorial Arena
October 31, 2014; 2 shows	Lexington	United States	Rupp Arena
November 1, 2014; 2 shows	Lexington	United States	Rupp Arena
November 6, 2014	Minneapolis	United States	Target Center
November 7, 2014; 2 shows	Minneapolis	United States	Target Center
November 8, 2014; 2 shows	Minneapolis	United States	Target Center
November 9, 2014	Minneapolis	United States	Target Center
November 13, 2014	Minneapolis	United States	Target Center
November 14, 2014; 2 shows	Minneapolis	United States	Target Center
November 15, 2014; 2 shows	Minneapolis	United States	Target Center
November 19, 2014	Greensboro	United States	Greensboro Coliseum
November 20, 2014	Greensboro	United States	Greensboro Coliseum
November 21, 2014	Greensboro	United States	Greensboro Coliseum
November 22, 2014	Greensboro	United States	Greensboro Coliseum
November 23, 2014	Greensboro	United States	Greensboro Coliseum
December 4, 2014	St. Louis	United States	Scottrade Center
December 5, 2014	St. Louis	United States	Scottrade Center
December 6, 2014	St. Louis	United States	Scottrade Center
December 7, 2014	St. Louis	United States	Scottrade Center
December 11, 2014	North Little Rock	United States	Verizon Arena
December 12, 2014	North Little Rock	United States	Verizon Arena
December 13, 2014	North Little Rock	United States	Verizon Arena
North America Leg 2
January 9, 2015	Tulsa	United States	BOK Center
January 10, 2015; 2 shows	Tulsa	United States	BOK Center
January 11, 2015	Tulsa	United States	BOK Center
January 15, 2015	Tulsa	United States	BOK Center
January 16, 2015	Tulsa	United States	BOK Center
January 17, 2015	Tulsa	United States	BOK Center
January 22, 2015	Boston	United States	TD Garden
January 23, 2015; 2 shows	Boston	United States	TD Garden
January 24, 2015; 2 shows	Boston	United States	TD Garden
January 25, 2015	Boston	United States	TD Garden
February 5, 2015	Pittsburgh	United States	Consol Energy Center
February 6, 2015; 2 shows	Pittsburgh	United States	Consol Energy Center
February 7, 2015; 2 shows	Pittsburgh	United States	Consol Energy Center
February 8, 2015	Pittsburgh	United States	Consol Energy Center
February 20, 2015	Detroit	United States	Joe Louis Arena
February 21, 2015; 2 shows	Detroit	United States	Joe Louis Arena
February 27, 2015	Detroit	United States	Joe Louis Arena
February 28, 2015; 2 shows	Detroit	United States	Joe Louis Arena
March 5, 2015	Buffalo	United States	First Niagara Center
March 6, 2015; 2 shows	Buffalo	United States	First Niagara Center
March 7, 2015; 2 shows	Buffalo	United States	First Niagara Center
March 8, 2015	Buffalo	United States	First Niagara Center
March 18, 2015	Denver	United States	Pepsi Center
March 19, 2015	Denver	United States	Pepsi Center
March 20, 2015; 2 shows	Denver	United States	Pepsi Center
March 21, 2015; 2 shows	Denver	United States	Pepsi Center
March 22, 2015; 2 shows	Denver	United States	Pepsi Center
March 24, 2015	Denver	United States	Pepsi Center
March 27, 2015	Sacramento	United States	Sleep Train Arena
March 28, 2015; 2 shows	Sacramento	United States	Sleep Train Arena
March 29, 2015	Sacramento	United States	Sleep Train Arena
March 31, 2015	Sacramento	United States	Sleep Train Arena
April 1, 2015	Sacramento	United States	Sleep Train Arena
April 12, 2015; 2 shows	Portland	United States	Moda Center
April 13, 2015	Portland	United States	Moda Center
April 15, 2015	Portland	United States	Moda Center
April 16, 2015	Portland	United States	Moda Center
April 24, 2015	State College	United States	Bryce Jordan Center
April 25, 2015; 2 shows	State College	United States	Bryce Jordan Center
May 1, 2015	State College	United States	Bryce Jordan Center
May 2, 2015; 2 shows	State College	United States	Bryce Jordan Center
May 7, 2015	Omaha	United States	CenturyLink Center Omaha
May 8, 2015; 2 shows	Omaha	United States	CenturyLink Center Omaha
May 9, 2015; 2 shows	Omaha	United States	CenturyLink Center Omaha
May 10, 2015	Omaha	United States	CenturyLink Center Omaha
May 28, 2015	Knoxville	United States	Thompson–Boling Arena
May 29, 2015	Knoxville	United States	Thompson–Boling Arena
May 30, 2015	Knoxville	United States	Thompson–Boling Arena
May 31, 2015	Knoxville	United States	Thompson–Boling Arena
June 12, 2015	Birmingham	United States	Legacy Arena
June 13, 2015; 2 shows	Birmingham	United States	Legacy Arena
June 26, 2015; 2 shows	Houston	United States	Toyota Center
June 27, 2015; 2 shows	Houston	United States	Toyota Center
July 3, 2015; 2 shows	Houston	United States	Toyota Center
July 4, 2015; 2 shows	Houston	United States	Toyota Center
July 10, 2015	New Orleans	United States	Smoothie King Center
July 11, 2015; 2 shows	New Orleans	United States	Smoothie King Center
July 12, 2015	New Orleans	United States	Smoothie King Center
North America Leg 3
September 17, 2015	Dallas	United States	American Airlines Center
September 18, 2015; 2 shows	Dallas	United States	American Airlines Center
September 19, 2015; 2 shows	Dallas	United States	American Airlines Center
September 20, 2015	Dallas	United States	American Airlines Center
September 22, 2015	Dallas	United States	American Airlines Center
September 25, 2015	Milwaukee	United States	BMO Harris Bradley Center
September 26, 2015; 2 shows	Milwaukee	United States	BMO Harris Bradley Center
October 9, 2015; 2 shows	Cleveland	United States	Quicken Loans Arena
October 10, 2015; 2 shows	Cleveland	United States	Quicken Loans Arena
October 16, 2015	Phoenix	United States	Talking Stick Resort Arena
October 17, 2015	Phoenix	United States	Talking Stick Resort Arena
October 23, 2015; 2 shows	Phoenix	United States	Talking Stick Resort Arena
October 24, 2015; 2 shows	Phoenix	United States	Talking Stick Resort Arena
October 29, 2015	Salt Lake City	United States	Vivint Smart Home Arena
October 30, 2015; 2 shows	Salt Lake City	United States	Vivint Smart Home Arena
October 31, 2015	Salt Lake City	United States	Vivint Smart Home Arena
November 5, 2015	San Diego	United States	Valley View Casino Center
November 6, 2015	San Diego	United States	Valley View Casino Center
November 7, 2015; 2 shows	San Diego	United States	Valley View Casino Center
November 8, 2015	San Diego	United States	Valley View Casino Center
November 13, 2015	San Jose	United States	SAP Center
November 14, 2015	San Jose	United States	SAP Center
November 15, 2015	San Jose	United States	SAP Center
December 3, 2015	Wichita	United States	Intrust Bank Arena
December 4, 2015	Wichita	United States	Intrust Bank Arena
December 5, 2015; 2 shows	Wichita	United States	Intrust Bank Arena
December 6, 2015; 2 shows	Wichita	United States	Intrust Bank Arena
North America Leg 4
January 14, 2016	Sunrise	United States	BB&T Center
January 15, 2016	Sunrise	United States	BB&T Center
January 16, 2016	Sunrise	United States	BB&T Center
January 29, 2016 (Note: This date was added at the last minute after the January 23 and 24 shows were rescheduled as a result of the January 2016 United States blizzard.)	Baltimore	United States	Royal Farms Arena
January 30, 2016; 2 shows (Note: The show that was originally scheduled for January 23 was postponed to the afternoon of January 30 due to the blizzard.)	Baltimore	United States	Royal Farms Arena
January 31, 2016; 2 shows (Note: The show that was originally scheduled for January 24 was postponed to the afternoon of January 31 due to the blizzard.)	Baltimore	United States	Royal Farms Arena
February 12, 2016	North Charleston	United States	North Charleston Coliseum
February 13, 2016; 2 shows	North Charleston	United States	North Charleston Coliseum
February 14, 2016	North Charleston	United States	North Charleston Coliseum
February 26, 2016	Worcester	United States	DCU Center
February 27, 2016	Worcester	United States	DCU Center
February 28, 2016	Worcester	United States	DCU Center
March 11, 2016	Raleigh	United States	PNC Arena
March 12, 2016	Raleigh	United States	PNC Arena
March 13, 2016	Raleigh	United States	PNC Arena
March 24, 2016	Hamilton	Canada	FirstOntario Centre
March 25, 2016	Hamilton	Canada	FirstOntario Centre
March 26, 2016; 2 shows	Hamilton	Canada	FirstOntario Centre
March 27, 2016	Hamilton	Canada	FirstOntario Centre
April 1, 2016	Ottawa	Canada	Canadian Tire Centre
April 2, 2016	Ottawa	Canada	Canadian Tire Centre
April 3, 2016; 2 shows	Ottawa	Canada	Canadian Tire Centre
April 8, 2016; 2 shows	Louisville	United States	KFC Yum! Center
April 9, 2016; 2 shows	Louisville	United States	KFC Yum! Center
April 15, 2016	Columbus	United States	Schottenstein Center
April 16, 2016	Columbus	United States	Schottenstein Center
April 17, 2016	Columbus	United States	Schottenstein Center
April 22, 2016	Columbus	United States	Schottenstein Center
April 23, 2016	Columbus	United States	Schottenstein Center
April 24, 2016	Columbus	United States	Schottenstein Center
April 29, 2016; 2 shows	Des Moines	United States	Wells Fargo Arena
April 30, 2016; 2 shows	Des Moines	United States	Wells Fargo Arena
May 1, 2016	Des Moines	United States	Wells Fargo Arena
May 3, 2016	Des Moines	United States	Wells Fargo Arena
May 5, 2016	Fargo	United States	Fargodome
May 6, 2016	Fargo	United States	Fargodome
May 7, 2016	Fargo	United States	Fargodome
May 8, 2016	Fargo	United States	Fargodome
May 12, 2016	Grand Rapids	United States	Van Andel Arena
May 13, 2016; 2 shows	Grand Rapids	United States	Van Andel Arena
May 14, 2016; 2 shows	Grand Rapids	United States	Van Andel Arena
May 15, 2016	Grand Rapids	United States	Van Andel Arena
North America Leg 5
June 9, 2016	Saskatoon	Canada	SaskTel Centre
June 10, 2016; 2 shows	Saskatoon	Canada	SaskTel Centre
June 11, 2016; 2 shows	Saskatoon	Canada	SaskTel Centre
June 12, 2016	Saskatoon	Canada	SaskTel Centre
June 17, 2016	Winnipeg	Canada	MTS Centre
June 18, 2016; 2 shows	Winnipeg	Canada	MTS Centre
June 19, 2016	Winnipeg	Canada	MTS Centre
June 24, 2016	Las Vegas	United States	T-Mobile Arena
June 25, 2016	Las Vegas	United States	T-Mobile Arena
July 2, 2016	Las Vegas	United States	T-Mobile Arena
July 3, 2016; 2 shows	Las Vegas	United States	T-Mobile Arena
July 4, 2016	Las Vegas	United States	T-Mobile Arena
July 8, 2016	New York City	United States	Yankee Stadium
July 9, 2016	New York City	United States	Yankee Stadium
July 22, 2016	San Antonio	United States	AT&T Center
July 23, 2016; 2 shows	San Antonio	United States	AT&T Center
July 24, 2016	San Antonio	United States	AT&T Center
July 29, 2016	Bossier City	United States	CenturyLink Center
July 30, 2016; 2 shows	Bossier City	United States	CenturyLink Center
North America Leg 6
September 16, 2016	Anaheim	United States	Honda Center
September 17, 2016	Anaheim	United States	Honda Center
September 18, 2016	Anaheim	United States	Honda Center
September 23, 2016	Fresno	United States	Save Mart Center
September 24, 2016; 2 shows	Fresno	United States	Save Mart Center
September 25, 2016	Fresno	United States	Save Mart Center
October 8, 2016; 2 shows (Note: The show that was originally scheduled for October 6 was postponed to the afternoon of October 8 due to Hurricane Matthew.)	Orlando	United States	Amway Center
October 9, 2016; 2 shows (Note: The show that was originally scheduled for October 7 was postponed to the afternoon of October 9 due to Hurricane Matthew.)	Orlando	United States	Amway Center
October 21, 2016	Charleston	United States	Charleston Civic Center
October 22, 2016; 2 shows	Charleston	United States	Charleston Civic Center
October 23, 2016	Charleston	United States	Charleston Civic Center
November 11, 2016	Richmond	United States	Richmond Coliseum
November 12, 2016; 2 shows	Richmond	United States	Richmond Coliseum
November 13, 2016	Richmond	United States	Richmond Coliseum
November 18, 2016	Greenville	United States	Bon Secours Wellness Arena
November 19, 2016	Greenville	United States	Bon Secours Wellness Arena
November 20, 2016	Greenville	United States	Bon Secours Wellness Arena
December 7, 2016	Honolulu	United States	Blaisdell Arena
December 8, 2016	Honolulu	United States	Blaisdell Arena
December 9, 2016	Honolulu	United States	Blaisdell Arena
December 10, 2016	Honolulu	United States	Blaisdell Arena
North America Leg 7
January 21, 2017	Cincinnati	United States	U.S. Bank Arena
January 22, 2017	Cincinnati	United States	U.S. Bank Arena
January 27, 2017	Cincinnati	United States	U.S. Bank Arena
January 28, 2017	Cincinnati	United States	U.S. Bank Arena
January 29, 2017	Cincinnati	United States	U.S. Bank Arena
February 2, 2017	Memphis	United States	FedExForum
February 3, 2017; 2 shows	Memphis	United States	FedExForum
February 4, 2017	Memphis	United States	FedExForum
February 17, 2017	Edmonton	Canada	Rogers Place
February 18, 2017; 2 shows	Edmonton	Canada	Rogers Place
February 19, 2017; 2 shows	Edmonton	Canada	Rogers Place
February 23, 2017	Edmonton	Canada	Rogers Place
February 24, 2017	Edmonton	Canada	Rogers Place
February 25, 2017; 2 shows	Edmonton	Canada	Rogers Place
March 10, 2017	Albany	United States	Times Union Center
March 11, 2017	Albany	United States	Times Union Center
March 12, 2017	Albany	United States	Times Union Center
March 24, 2017	Philadelphia	United States	Wells Fargo Center
March 25, 2017; 2 shows	Philadelphia	United States	Wells Fargo Center
March 26, 2017	Philadelphia	United States	Wells Fargo Center
March 30, 2017	Lubbock	United States	United Supermarkets Arena
March 31, 2017	Lubbock	United States	United Supermarkets Arena
April 1, 2017; 2 shows	Lubbock	United States	United Supermarkets Arena
April 2, 2017	Lubbock	United States	United Supermarkets Arena
April 7, 2017	Las Cruces	United States	Pan American Center
April 8, 2017; 2 shows	Las Cruces	United States	Pan American Center
April 9, 2017; 2 shows	Las Cruces	United States	Pan American Center
April 28, 2017	Champaign	United States	State Farm Center
April 29, 2017; 2 shows	Champaign	United States	State Farm Center
April 30, 2017	Champaign	United States	State Farm Center
May 5, 2017	Kansas City	United States	Sprint Center
May 6, 2017; 2 shows	Kansas City	United States	Sprint Center
May 7, 2017; 2 shows	Kansas City	United States	Sprint Center
May 12, 2017	Kansas City	United States	Sprint Center
May 13, 2017	Kansas City	United States	Sprint Center
June 9, 2017	Billings	United States	Rimrock Auto Arena
June 10, 2017; 2 shows	Billings	United States	Rimrock Auto Arena
June 11, 2017; 2 shows	Billings	United States	Rimrock Auto Arena
June 23, 2017	Lafayette	United States	Cajundome
June 24, 2017	Lafayette	United States	Cajundome
June 25, 2017	Lafayette	United States	Cajundome
June 30, 2017	Lafayette	United States	Cajundome
July 1, 2017	Lafayette	United States	Cajundome
July 14, 2017; 2 shows	Oklahoma City	United States	Chesapeake Energy Arena
July 15, 2017; 2 shows	Oklahoma City	United States	Chesapeake Energy Arena
July 21, 2017	Inglewood	United States	The Forum
July 22, 2017	Inglewood	United States	The Forum
July 28, 2017	Inglewood	United States	The Forum
July 29, 2017	Inglewood	United States	The Forum
North America Leg 8
September 1, 2017	Calgary	Canada	Scotiabank Saddledome
September 2, 2017; 2 shows	Calgary	Canada	Scotiabank Saddledome
September 3, 2017	Calgary	Canada	Scotiabank Saddledome
September 8, 2017	Calgary	Canada	Scotiabank Saddledome
September 9, 2017; 2 shows	Calgary	Canada	Scotiabank Saddledome
September 15, 2017	Sioux Falls	United States	Denny Sanford Premier Center
September 16, 2017; 2 shows	Sioux Falls	United States	Denny Sanford Premier Center
September 17, 2017	Sioux Falls	United States	Denny Sanford Premier Center
September 22, 2017	Sioux Falls	United States	Denny Sanford Premier Center
September 23, 2017; 2 shows	Sioux Falls	United States	Denny Sanford Premier Center
September 24, 2017; 2 shows	Sioux Falls	United States	Denny Sanford Premier Center
October 5, 2017	Indianapolis	United States	Bankers Life Fieldhouse
October 6, 2017	Indianapolis	United States	Bankers Life Fieldhouse
October 7, 2017; 2 shows	Indianapolis	United States	Bankers Life Fieldhouse
October 8, 2017	Indianapolis	United States	Bankers Life Fieldhouse
October 12, 2017	Atlanta	United States	Mercedes-Benz Stadium
October 20, 2017	Lincoln	United States	Pinnacle Bank Arena
October 21, 2017; 2 shows	Lincoln	United States	Pinnacle Bank Arena
October 22, 2017; 2 shows	Lincoln	United States	Pinnacle Bank Arena
November 3, 2017	Tacoma	United States	Tacoma Dome
November 4, 2017; 2 shows	Tacoma	United States	Tacoma Dome
November 5, 2017; 2 shows	Tacoma	United States	Tacoma Dome
November 9, 2017	Spokane	United States	Spokane Arena
November 10, 2017	Spokane	United States	Spokane Arena
November 11, 2017; 2 shows	Spokane	United States	Spokane Arena
November 12, 2017; 2 shows	Spokane	United States	Spokane Arena
November 14, 2017	Spokane	United States	Spokane Arena
December 1, 2017	Newark	United States	Prudential Center
December 2, 2017	Newark	United States	Prudential Center
December 3, 2017	Newark	United States	Prudential Center
December 9, 2017	Nashville	United States	Bridgestone Arena
December 10, 2017	Nashville	United States	Bridgestone Arena
December 15, 2017	Nashville	United States	Bridgestone Arena
December 16, 2017	Nashville	United States	Bridgestone Arena
December 17, 2017	Nashville	United States	Bridgestone Arena
December 22, 2017	Nashville	United States	Bridgestone Arena
December 23, 2017	Nashville	United States	Bridgestone Arena
October 20, 2018	South Bend	United States	Notre Dame Stadium

== Cancelled shows ==
List of cancelled concerts, showing date, city, country, venue and reason for cancellation
Date	City	Country	Venue	Reason
June 5, 2015	Tampa	United States	Amalie Arena	Canceled due to a scheduling conflict with the 2015 Stanley Cup Finals.
June 6, 2015; 2 shows	Tampa	United States	Amalie Arena	Canceled due to a scheduling conflict with the 2015 Stanley Cup Finals.

== Personnel ==
- Robert Bailey – backing vocals
- Bruce Bouton – pedal steel guitar, lap steel guitar, electric guitar
- Garth Brooks – vocals, acoustic guitar, electric guitar
- Steve Cox – keyboards
- David Gant – keyboards
- Johnny Garcia – electric guitar
- Mark Greenwood – bass guitar, backing vocals
- Vicki Hampton – backing vocals
- Jimmy Mattingly – fiddle, acoustic guitar
- Mike Palmer – drums, percussion
- Karyn Rochelle – backing vocals
- Trisha Yearwood – vocals

== Grossing ==
- 2014: $51.0 million from 51 shows
- 2015: $114.9 million from 120 shows
- 2016: $97.0 million from 102 shows
- 2017: $101.4 million from 93 shows

Total available grossing: $364.3 million from 366 shows.

== See also ==
- List of Garth Brooks concert tours
- List of highest-grossing concert tours
- List of most-attended concert tours
