= Garth at Wynn =

Garth Brooks concert residency (2009–2014)

- Residency by Garth Brooks
- Location: Paradise, Nevada, U.S.
- Venue: Encore Theatre
- Associated album: Blame It All on My Roots: Five Decades of Influences
- Start date: December 11, 2009
- End date: January 4, 2014
- Legs: 6
- No. of shows: 4 in 2009; 60 in 2010; 56 in 2011; 46 in 2012; 17 in 2013; 4 in 2014; 187 in total

Garth Brooks concert chronology
- Garth Brooks: Live in LA (2008); Garth at Wynn (2009–2014); The Garth Brooks World Tour (2014–2017)

Garth at Wynn was a concert residency by American country pop singer Garth Brooks at the Encore Theatre on the Las Vegas Strip in Paradise, Nevada. It began on December 11, 2009 and featured acoustic concerts with Brooks and Trisha Yearwood on periodic weekends until January 4, 2014. The first multi-concert live performances by Brooks since 1998, the 187-show residency predominantly featured a set list designed to show Brooks' music influences. This prompted the release of Brooks' 2013 album, Blame It All on My Roots: Five Decades of Influences.

== Background ==
Following his retirement from the music industry in 2002, Garth Brooks rarely performed outside occasional events, such as a series in Kansas City and benefit concerts in Los Angeles. Despite his original intention to remain officially retired until 2014, Brooks, along with wife Trisha Yearwood, received an offer from Steve Wynn to perform a residency show at his Encore Theatre in Las Vegas. Living in Oklahoma, Brooks agreed to perform on periodic weekends, provided the inclusion of a personal airplane for quick transportation to and from the venue. Over time, the concerts became more and more influence-based, consisting of a set list featuring Brooks covering his most influential songs of the past, with a brief appearance by Yearwood.

Although nearly all concerts of the residency featured Brooks performing acoustically, the final four concerts included Brooks' entire band. This served as a transition for Brooks, going from a one-man acoustic show to his world tour, which began in September 2014.

== Concert films and broadcasts ==
Concerts performed on May 24, 2013 were filmed for later branding as a DVD, Garth Brooks: Live at the Wynn, included with the purchase of Brooks' album, Blame It All on My Roots: Five Decades of Influences. Additionally, the final concert of the acoustic residency on November 29, 2013 was filmed and broadcast live on CBS. Titled Garth Brooks: Live from Las Vegas, the special was broadcast as promotion for Brooks' album, and it was Brooks' first televised concert special since his 2008 Los Angeles show. It attracted 9.33 million live viewers, number one in its timeslot.

== Critical reception ==
Melinda Newman of Variety praised the shows' simplicity, commenting, "Leave it to Garth Brooks to come to Las Vegas with a show that goes against everything Sin City represents: There are no big costume changes, dancing girls, elaborate sets or special effects: just a man and his guitar. And it's more than enough." Joe Brown of Las Vegas Weekly commented on the closeness of the shows, stating, "each concert of Brooks' five-year engagement has the potential to feel like a one-of-a-kind occurrence, which makes the audience feel special." Norm Clarke of the Las Vegas Review-Journal remarked, "Brooks was at his best on every level."

== Set list ==
This set list is representative of the performance on October 5, 2012. It does not represent all concerts for the duration of the residency.

1. "Much Too Young (To Feel This Damn Old)"
2. "Mama Tried" (Merle Haggard cover)
3. "She Thinks I Still Care" (George Jones cover)
4. "He Stopped Loving Her Today" (George Jones cover)
5. "The Grand Tour" (George Jones cover)
6. "Mrs. Robinson" (Simon & Garfunkel cover)
7. "The Sound of Silence" (Simon & Garfunkel cover)
8. "Everybody's Talkin'" (Harry Nilsson cover)
9. "Hey Jude" (The Beatles cover)
10. "Wild World" (Cat Stevens cover)
11. "(Sittin' On) The Dock of the Bay" (Otis Redding cover)
12. "Midnight Train to Georgia" (Gladys Knight & the Pips cover)
13. "Ain't No Sunshine" (Bill Withers cover)
14. "I Heard It Through the Grapevine" (Marvin Gaye cover)
15. "Rodeo"
16. "Carolina in My Mind" (James Taylor cover)
17. "Fire and Rain" (James Taylor cover)
18. "The River"
19. "Sweet Baby James" (James Taylor cover)
20. "American Pie" (Don McLean cover)
21. "Night Moves" (Bob Seger cover)
22. "Turn the Page" (Bob Seger cover)
23. "The Thunder Rolls"
24. "Unwound" (George Strait cover)
25. "Diggin' Up Bones" (Randy Travis cover)
26. "Ten Feet Away" (Keith Whitley cover)
27. "In Another's Eyes" (duet with Trisha Yearwood)
28. "She's in Love with the Boy" (performed by Trisha Yearwood)
29. "The Call" (duet with Trisha Yearwood)
30. "If Tomorrow Never Comes"
31. "Two of a Kind, Workin' on a Full House"
32. "You Never Even Called Me by My Name" (David Allan Coe cover)
33. "Operator (That's Not the Way It Feels)" (Jim Croce cover)
34. "Unanswered Prayers"
35. "That Summer"
36. "To Make You Feel My Love"
37. "Papa Loved Mama"
38. "Shameless"

Encores

39. "The Dance"
40. "Callin' Baton Rouge"
41. "Piano Man" (Billy Joel cover)
42. "Friends in Low Places"

== Residency dates ==
Date	City	Country	Venue
Leg 1
December 11, 2009	Las Vegas	United States	Encore Theatre
December 12, 2009; 2 shows	Las Vegas	United States	Encore Theatre
December 13, 2009	Las Vegas	United States	Encore Theatre
January 1, 2010	Las Vegas	United States	Encore Theatre
January 2, 2010; 2 shows	Las Vegas	United States	Encore Theatre
January 3, 2010	Las Vegas	United States	Encore Theatre
January 22, 2010	Las Vegas	United States	Encore Theatre
January 23, 2010; 2 shows	Las Vegas	United States	Encore Theatre
January 24, 2010	Las Vegas	United States	Encore Theatre
February 12, 2010	Las Vegas	United States	Encore Theatre
February 13, 2010; 2 shows	Las Vegas	United States	Encore Theatre
February 14, 2010	Las Vegas	United States	Encore Theatre
February 26, 2010	Las Vegas	United States	Encore Theatre
February 27, 2010; 2 shows	Las Vegas	United States	Encore Theatre
February 28, 2010	Las Vegas	United States	Encore Theatre
March 26, 2010	Las Vegas	United States	Encore Theatre
March 27, 2010; 2 shows	Las Vegas	United States	Encore Theatre
March 28, 2010	Las Vegas	United States	Encore Theatre
April 9, 2010	Las Vegas	United States	Encore Theatre
April 10, 2010; 2 shows	Las Vegas	United States	Encore Theatre
April 11, 2010	Las Vegas	United States	Encore Theatre
Leg 2
June 25, 2010	Las Vegas	United States	Encore Theatre
June 26, 2010; 2 shows	Las Vegas	United States	Encore Theatre
June 27, 2010	Las Vegas	United States	Encore Theatre
July 16, 2010	Las Vegas	United States	Encore Theatre
July 17, 2010; 2 shows	Las Vegas	United States	Encore Theatre
July 18, 2010	Las Vegas	United States	Encore Theatre
August 6, 2010	Las Vegas	United States	Encore Theatre
August 7, 2010; 2 shows	Las Vegas	United States	Encore Theatre
August 8, 2010	Las Vegas	United States	Encore Theatre
September 10, 2010	Las Vegas	United States	Encore Theatre
September 11, 2010; 2 shows	Las Vegas	United States	Encore Theatre
September 12, 2010	Las Vegas	United States	Encore Theatre
October 1, 2010	Las Vegas	United States	Encore Theatre
October 2, 2010; 2 shows	Las Vegas	United States	Encore Theatre
October 3, 2010	Las Vegas	United States	Encore Theatre
October 22, 2010	Las Vegas	United States	Encore Theatre
October 23, 2010; 2 shows	Las Vegas	United States	Encore Theatre
October 24, 2010	Las Vegas	United States	Encore Theatre
November 5, 2010	Las Vegas	United States	Encore Theatre
November 6, 2010; 2 shows	Las Vegas	United States	Encore Theatre
November 7, 2010	Las Vegas	United States	Encore Theatre
November 19, 2010	Las Vegas	United States	Encore Theatre
November 20, 2010; 2 shows	Las Vegas	United States	Encore Theatre
November 21, 2010	Las Vegas	United States	Encore Theatre
December 3, 2010	Las Vegas	United States	Encore Theatre
December 4, 2010; 2 shows	Las Vegas	United States	Encore Theatre
December 5, 2010	Las Vegas	United States	Encore Theatre
January 21, 2011	Las Vegas	United States	Encore Theatre
January 22, 2011; 2 shows	Las Vegas	United States	Encore Theatre
January 23, 2011	Las Vegas	United States	Encore Theatre
February 11, 2011	Las Vegas	United States	Encore Theatre
February 12, 2011; 2 shows	Las Vegas	United States	Encore Theatre
February 13, 2011	Las Vegas	United States	Encore Theatre
February 25, 2011	Las Vegas	United States	Encore Theatre
February 26, 2011; 2 shows	Las Vegas	United States	Encore Theatre
February 27, 2011	Las Vegas	United States	Encore Theatre
March 25, 2011; 2 shows	Las Vegas	United States	Encore Theatre
March 26, 2011; 2 shows	Las Vegas	United States	Encore Theatre
April 8, 2011; 2 shows	Las Vegas	United States	Encore Theatre
April 9, 2011; 2 shows	Las Vegas	United States	Encore Theatre
Leg 3
June 3, 2011; 2 shows	Las Vegas	United States	Encore Theatre
June 4, 2011; 2 shows	Las Vegas	United States	Encore Theatre
June 24, 2011; 2 shows	Las Vegas	United States	Encore Theatre
June 25, 2011; 2 shows	Las Vegas	United States	Encore Theatre
July 22, 2011; 2 shows	Las Vegas	United States	Encore Theatre
July 23, 2011; 2 shows	Las Vegas	United States	Encore Theatre
August 19, 2011; 2 shows	Las Vegas	United States	Encore Theatre
August 20, 2011; 2 shows	Las Vegas	United States	Encore Theatre
September 9, 2011; 2 shows	Las Vegas	United States	Encore Theatre
September 10, 2011; 2 shows	Las Vegas	United States	Encore Theatre
September 23, 2011; 2 shows	Las Vegas	United States	Encore Theatre
September 24, 2011; 2 shows	Las Vegas	United States	Encore Theatre
October 7, 2011; 2 shows	Las Vegas	United States	Encore Theatre
October 8, 2011; 2 shows	Las Vegas	United States	Encore Theatre
October 21, 2011; 2 shows	Las Vegas	United States	Encore Theatre
October 22, 2011; 2 shows	Las Vegas	United States	Encore Theatre
November 4, 2011; 2 shows	Las Vegas	United States	Encore Theatre
November 5, 2011; 2 shows	Las Vegas	United States	Encore Theatre
January 5, 2012; 2 shows	Las Vegas	United States	Encore Theatre
January 6, 2012; 2 shows	Las Vegas	United States	Encore Theatre
January 7, 2012; 2 shows	Las Vegas	United States	Encore Theatre
January 27, 2012; 2 shows	Las Vegas	United States	Encore Theatre
January 28, 2012; 2 shows	Las Vegas	United States	Encore Theatre
February 17, 2012; 2 shows	Las Vegas	United States	Encore Theatre
February 18, 2012; 2 shows	Las Vegas	United States	Encore Theatre
March 2, 2012; 2 shows	Las Vegas	United States	Encore Theatre
March 3, 2012; 2 shows	Las Vegas	United States	Encore Theatre
March 30, 2012; 2 shows	Las Vegas	United States	Encore Theatre
March 31, 2012; 2 shows	Las Vegas	United States	Encore Theatre
April 20, 2012; 2 shows	Las Vegas	United States	Encore Theatre
April 21, 2012; 2 shows	Las Vegas	United States	Encore Theatre
June 8, 2012; 2 shows	Las Vegas	United States	Encore Theatre
June 9, 2012; 2 shows	Las Vegas	United States	Encore Theatre
Leg 4
September 21, 2012; 2 shows	Las Vegas	United States	Encore Theatre
September 22, 2012; 2 shows	Las Vegas	United States	Encore Theatre
October 5, 2012; 2 shows	Las Vegas	United States	Encore Theatre
October 6, 2012; 2 shows	Las Vegas	United States	Encore Theatre
October 26, 2012; 2 shows	Las Vegas	United States	Encore Theatre
October 27, 2012; 2 shows	Las Vegas	United States	Encore Theatre
November 16, 2012; 2 shows	Las Vegas	United States	Encore Theatre
November 17, 2012; 2 shows	Las Vegas	United States	Encore Theatre
Leg 5
May 24, 2013; 2 shows (Note: These concerts were filmed and later released on DVD alongside Brooks' album, Blame It All on My Roots: Five Decades of Influences.)	Las Vegas	United States	Encore Theatre
May 25, 2013; 2 shows	Las Vegas	United States	Encore Theatre
July 5, 2013; 2 shows	Las Vegas	United States	Encore Theatre
July 6, 2013; 2 shows	Las Vegas	United States	Encore Theatre
Leg 6
October 18, 2013; 2 shows	Las Vegas	United States	Encore Theatre
October 19, 2013; 2 shows	Las Vegas	United States	Encore Theatre
November 8, 2013; 2 shows	Las Vegas	United States	Encore Theatre
November 9, 2013; 2 shows	Las Vegas	United States	Encore Theatre
November 29, 2013 (Note: This concert was the final show of the acoustic residency, broadcast live on CBS.)	Las Vegas	United States	Encore Theatre
January 3, 2014 (Note: These concerts, dubbed "Garth Brooks: The Man, His Band and His Music", featured a different set list, with Brooks performing a medley of his older hits.); 2 shows	Las Vegas	United States	Encore Theatre
January 4, 2014; 2 shows	Las Vegas	United States	Encore Theatre

== See also ==
- List of Garth Brooks concert tours
