= Garth Brooks: Live in LA =

- Tour by Garth Brooks
- Start date: January 25, 2008
- End date: January 26, 2008
- No. of shows: 5

Garth Brooks concert chronology
- Garth Brooks: Live in Kansas City (2007); Garth Brooks: Live in LA (2008); Garth at Wynn (2009–2014)

Garth Brooks: Live in LA was a series of benefit concerts held by American country pop singer Garth Brooks in 2008. The five concerts, all held at Staples Center in Los Angeles, California, were benefits for Fire Intervention Relief Effort, serving those impacted by the 2007 California wildfires. 100% of ticket prices were donated directly to the charity.

Originally intended to be only one concert, extremely high ticket demand was seen, resulting in the addition of four shows (all of which sold out in 59 minutes); Brooks subsequently became the first artist ever to perform five concerts in two days. He was accompanied by wife Trisha Yearwood, who performed as well. The second concert of the series was broadcast live on CBS, with on-screen information available for viewers to donate to the charity.

== Set list ==
This set list is representative of the second performance on January 25, 2008. It does not represent all concerts for the duration of the series.

1. "The Thunder Rolls"
2. "Callin' Baton Rouge"
3. "Rodeo"
4. "More Than a Memory"
5. "We Shall Be Free"
6. "Two of a Kind, Workin' on a Full House"
7. "The Beaches of Cheyenne"
8. "Papa Loved Mama"
9. "In Another's Eyes" (ft. Trisha Yearwood)
10. "Two Pina Coladas"
11. "Workin' for a Livin'" (ft. Huey Lewis)
12. "Friends in Low Places"
13. "Much Too Young (To Feel This Damn Old)"
14. "The River"
15. "The Fever"
16. "That Summer"
17. "The Dance"
18. "Ain't Goin' Down ('Til the Sun Comes Up)"

Encores

19. "Unanswered Prayers"
20. "Fire and Rain" (James Taylor cover)
21. "Amarillo By Morning" (George Strait cover)
22. "Ten Feet Away" (Keith Whitley cover)
23. "Night Moves" (Bob Seger cover)
24. "Piano Man" (Billy Joel cover)
25. "American Pie" (Don McLean cover)

== Personnel ==
- Robert Bailey – backing vocals
- Garth Brooks – vocals, acoustic guitar
- David Gant – keyboards
- Johnny Garcia – electric guitar
- Mark Greenwood – bass guitar, backing vocals
- Vicki Hampton – backing vocals
- Gordon Kennedy – electric guitar
- Huey Lewis – vocals and harmonica on "Workin' for a Livin'"
- Jimmy Mattingly – fiddle, acoustic guitar, backing vocals
- Mike Palmer – drums, percussion
- Crystal Taliefero – percussion, backing vocals
- Trisha Yearwood – vocals on "In Another's Eyes"

== Tour dates ==
| Date | City | Country | Venue |
|---|---|---|---|
| January 25, 2008; 2 shows | Los Angeles | United States | Staples Center |
| January 26, 2008; 3 shows | Los Angeles | United States | Staples Center |

== See also ==
- List of Garth Brooks concert tours
