= List of most-attended concert tours =

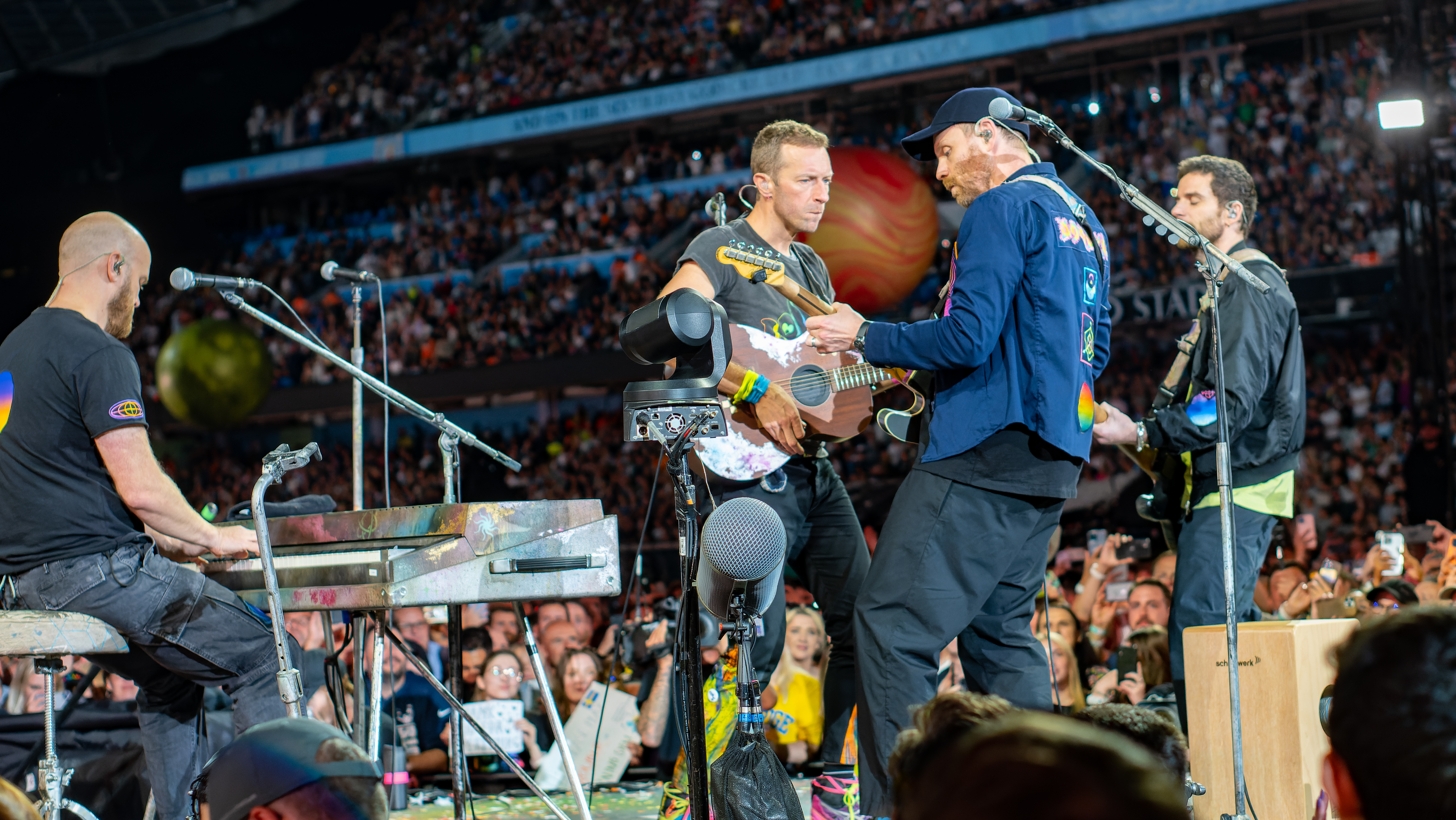
Coldplay's Music of the Spheres World Tour is the most-attended tour of all time, with more than 13.1 million tickets sold as of 2025

The following is a list of the most-attended concert tours in history, with at least 3.5 million tickets sold. There are also two more lists: most attended tours annually since 1997 and tours with most tickets sold in a single day.

Pollstar and Billboard provide boxscores, which are the primary data showing the commercial performance of tours, but since not all concerts are reported to them, especially before 2000, the number of tickets may rely on estimations by other sources. Tours may score large total attendances because of their number of shows, which can span multiple calendar years. The success of a tour is measured by both the number of attendances and its gross revenue, since it’s not necessary that the most-attended tours generate the largest profit due to ticket pricing.

Coldplay was the first act to sell over 10 million tickets on the same concert run, achieving the feat with the Music of the Spheres World Tour (2022–2025). The band is also the only act to sell a million tickets in a single day on two different occasions. U2 is the only act to achieve highest annual tour attendance six times.

Tina Turner, Cher, Madonna, Taylor Swift and Pink are the only women to achieve tours attended by 3.5 million people or more. Swift holds multiple records: first solo act to reach 10 million attendance (The Eras Tour between 2023 and 2024); highest annual tour attendance (5.21 million in 2024); sole woman to have the highest annual tour attendance, achieving it twice (2023 and 2024); and most tour tickets sold in a single day (2.4 million).

== Most-attended tours ==
=== Over 5 million tickets sold ===
Keys
| † | Indicates an ongoing tour |
| * | Indicates the tour had sold the most tickets up to that point |

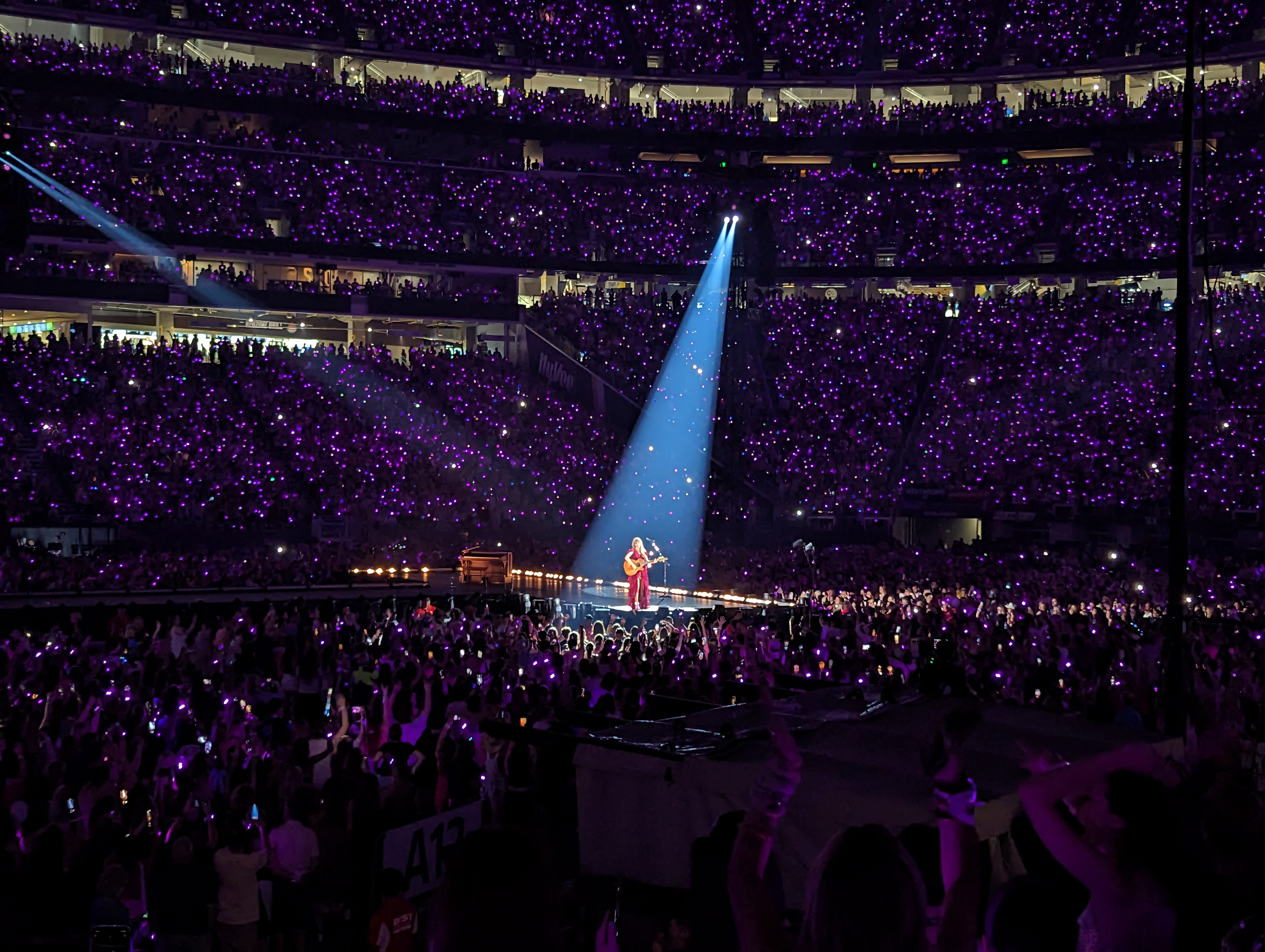
Audience view of the Eras Tour in the United States

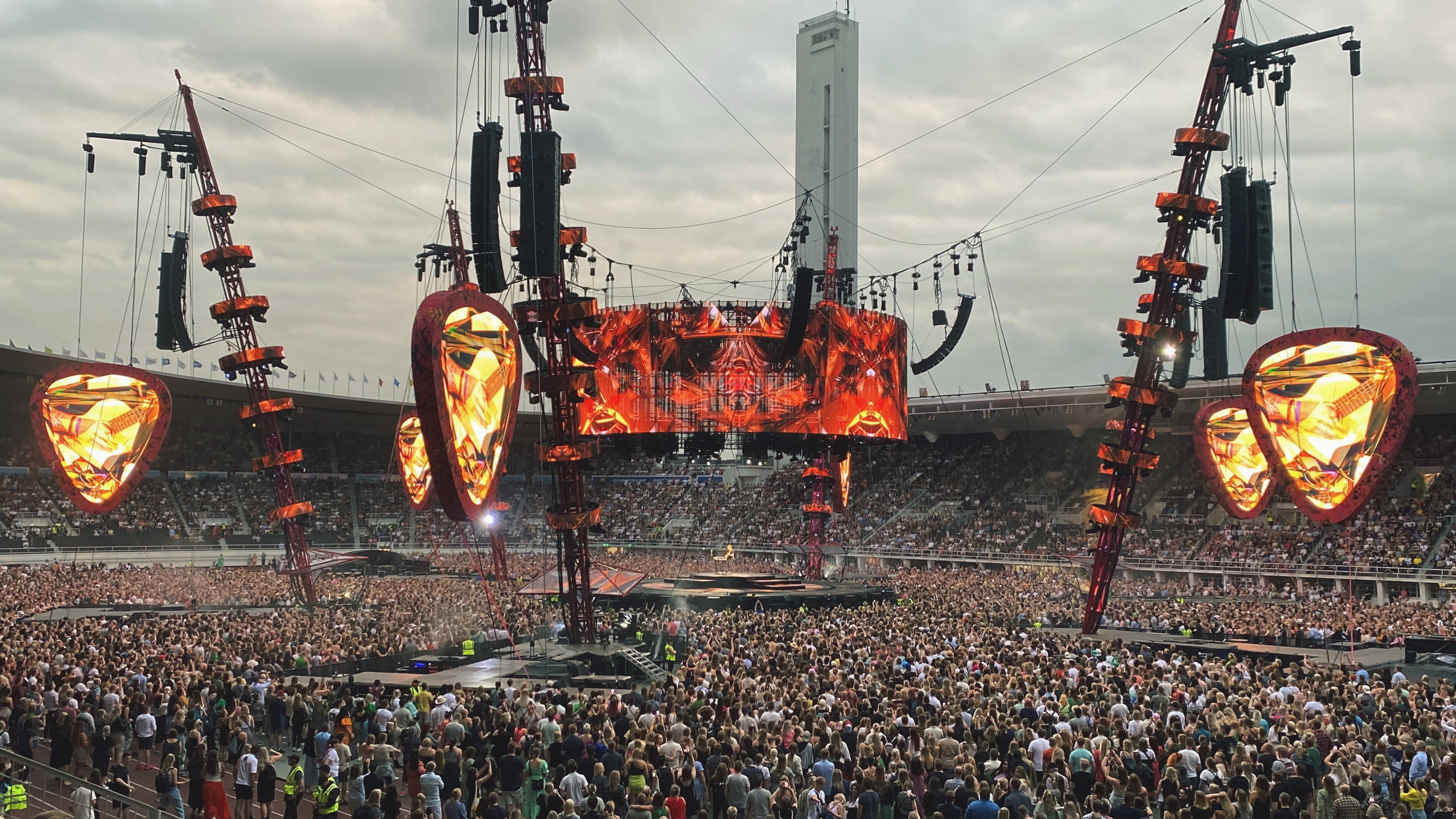
Audience view of the +–=÷× Tour in Finland

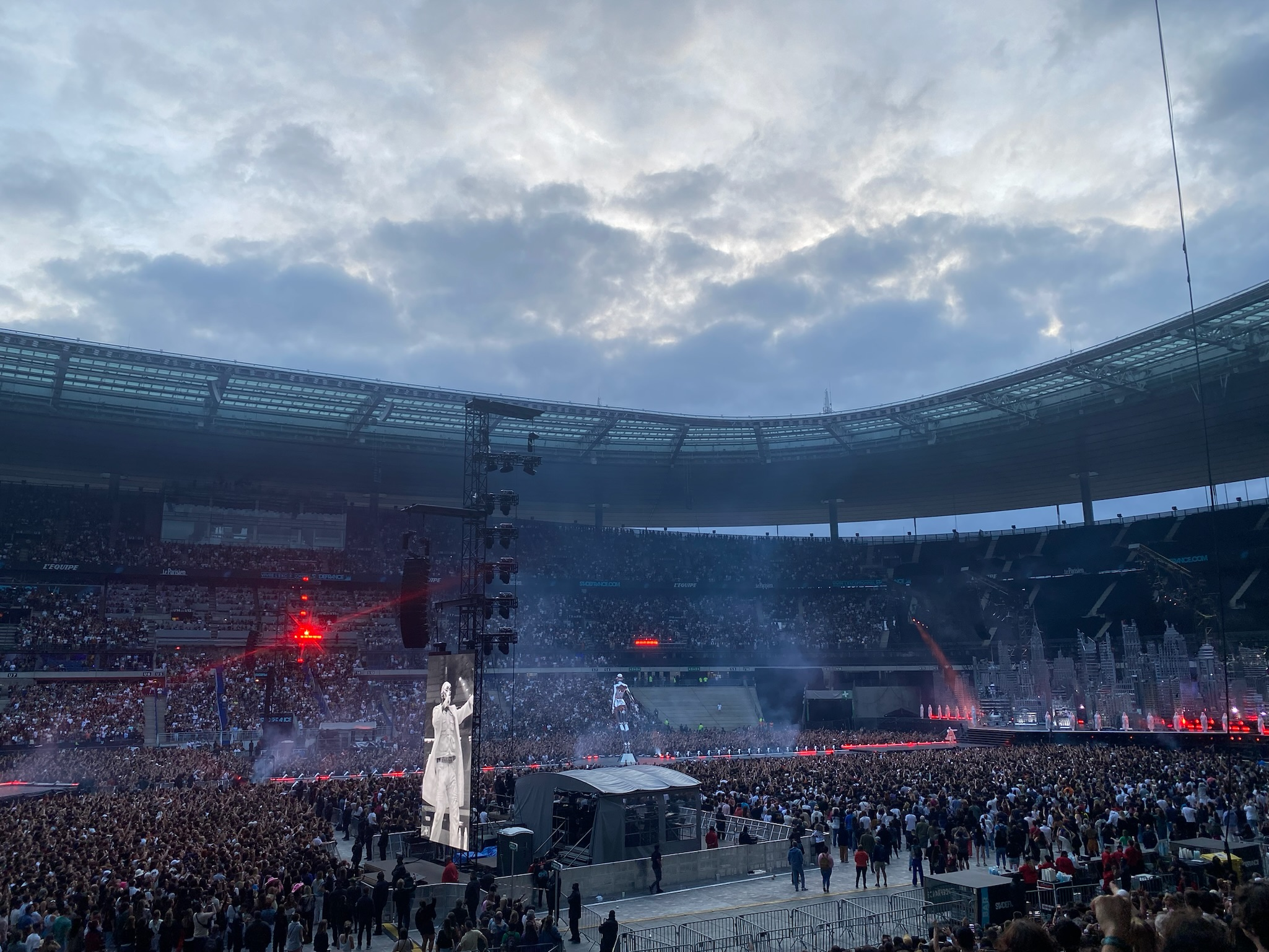
Audience view of the After Hours til Dawn Tour in France

Tours with over 5 million tickets sold
| Rank | Tickets sold | Artist | Tour title | Year | Shows | Average attendance | Ref. |
|---|---|---|---|---|---|---|---|
| 1 | 13,138,644 | Coldplay | Music of the Spheres World Tour * | 2022–2025 | 223 | 58,918 | |
| 2 | 10,168,008 | Taylor Swift | The Eras Tour | 2023–2024 | 149 | 68,242 | |
| 3 | 8,908,150 | Ed Sheeran | ÷ Tour * | 2017–2019 | 255 | 34,934 | |
| 4 | 8,800,000 | Ed Sheeran | +–=÷× Tour | 2022–2025 | 169 | 52,071 | |
| 5 | 8,157,456 | The Weeknd | After Hours til Dawn Tour | 2022–2026 | 158 | 51,629 | |
| 6 | 7,272,046 | U2 | 360° Tour * | 2009–2011 | 110 | 66,110 | |
| 7 | 7,100,000 | Dire Straits | On Every Street Tour * | 1991–1992 | 229 | 31,004 | (Note: Multiple reports claim 7.1 million tickets sold, see citations.) |
| 8 | 7,000,000 | Guns N' Roses | Use Your Illusion Tour | 1991–1993 | 192 | 36,458 | |
| 9 | 6,400,000 | The Rolling Stones | Voodoo Lounge Tour | 1994–1995 | 128 | 50,000 | (Note: Older reports estimate 6.5 million sold, see citations.) |
| 10 | 6,300,000 | Garth Brooks | The Garth Brooks World Tour 2014–2017 | 2014–2017 | 390 | 16,154 | |
| 11 | 6,000,000 | The Rolling Stones | Steel Wheels/Urban Jungle Tour * | 1989–1990 | 115 | 52,174 | |
| 12 | 5,994,810 | Elton John | Farewell Yellow Brick Road | 2018–2023 | 330 | 18,166 | |
| 13 | 5,500,000 | Pink Floyd | The Division Bell Tour | 1994 | 110 | 50,000 | |
| 14 | 5,500,000 | Garth Brooks | The Garth Brooks World Tour 1996–1998 | 1996–1998 | 220 | 25,000 | |
| 15 | 5,389,586 | Coldplay | A Head Full of Dreams Tour | 2016–2017 | 114 | 47,277 | |
| 16 | 5,371,891 | Guns N' Roses | Not in This Lifetime... Tour | 2016–2019 | 175 | 30,697 | |
| 17 | 5,321,900 | Metallica | M72 World Tour | 2023–2026 | 86 | 61,883 | (Note: The tour was attended by 3.9 million people from April 2023 to August 2025 (64 shows). The attendance increased by 334,000 in November 2025 (6 shows), 506,000 in May 2026 (7 shows), 426,900 in June 2026 (7 shows) and 155,000 in July 2026 (2 shows).) |
| 18 | 5,300,000 | U2 | Zoo TV Tour | 1992–1993 | 157 | 33,758 | |
| 19 | 5,080,000 | Joker Xue | Extraterrestrial World Tour | 2021–2025 | 145 | 35,034 | |
| 20 | 5,025,129 | Rammstein | Stadium Tour | 2019–2024 | 141 | 35,639 | |
| 21 | 5,000,000 | Bruce Springsteen · E Street Band | Born in the U.S.A. Tour * | 1984–1985 | 156 | 32,051 | |
| 22 | 5,000,000 | Harry Styles | Love On Tour | 2021–2023 | 169 | 29,586 | |

=== Over 3.5 million tickets sold ===
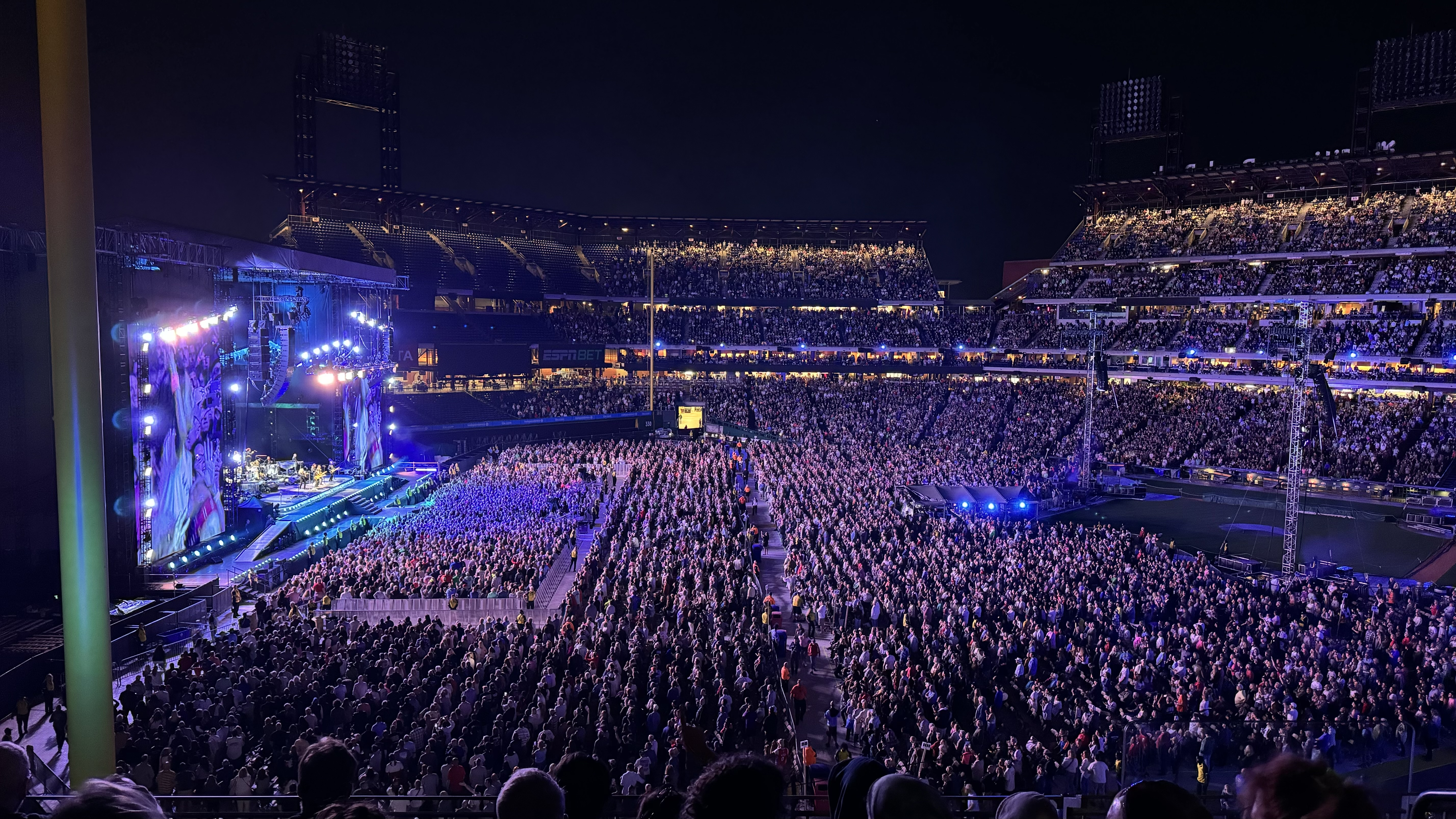
Audience view of the Springsteen and E Street Band 2023–2025 Tour in the United States

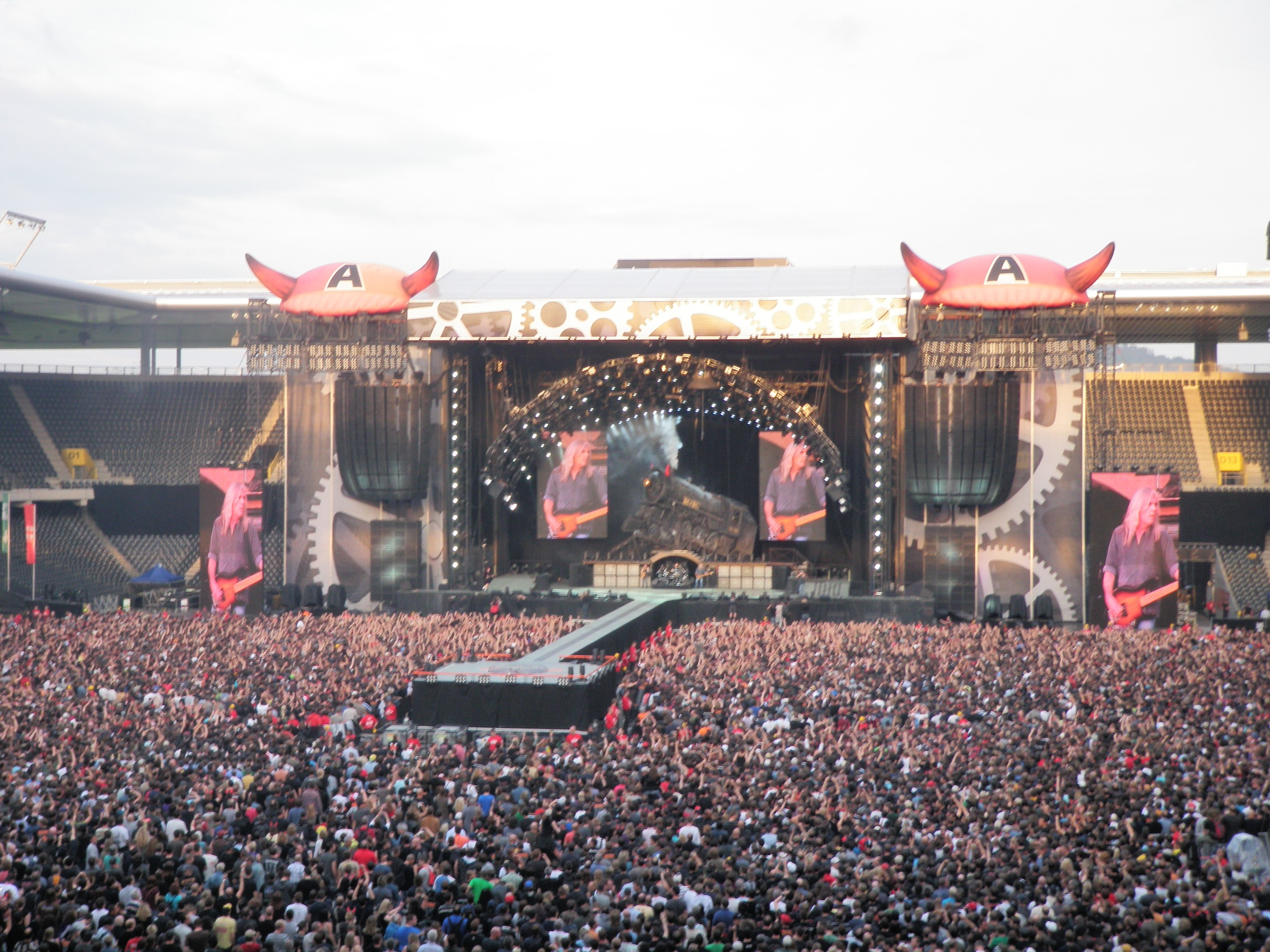
Audience view of the Black Ice World Tour in Switzerland

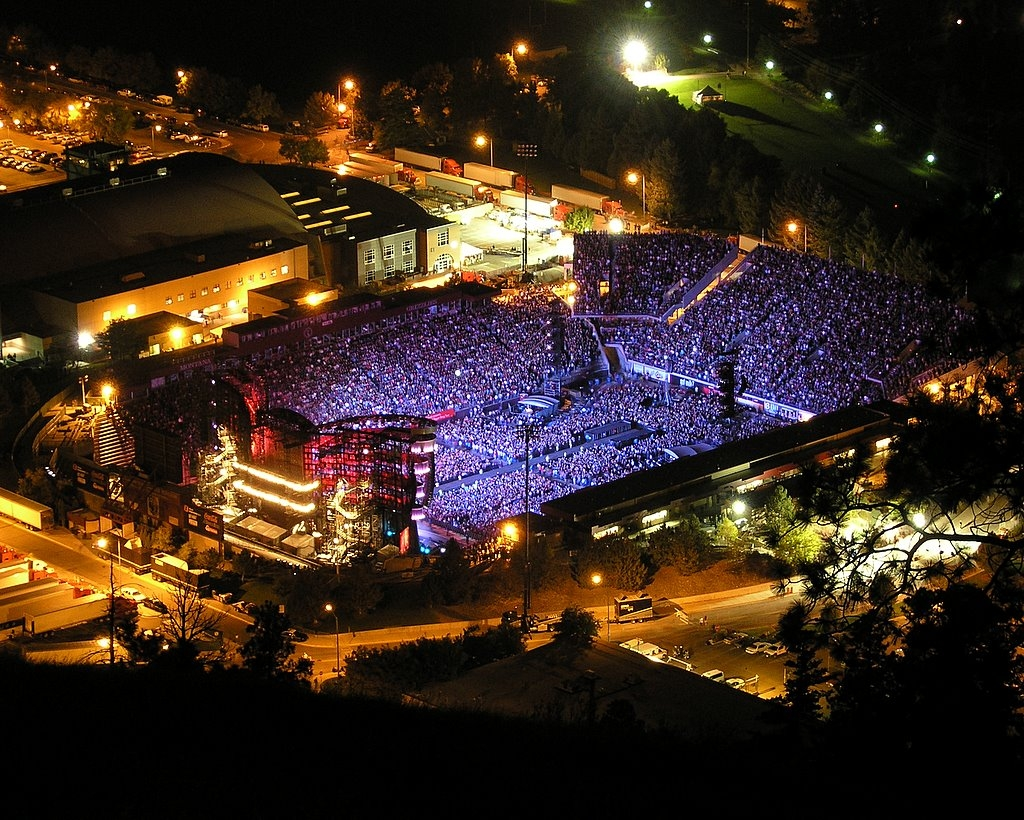
Audience view of the Bigger Bang Tour in the United States

Tours with over 3.5 million tickets sold
| Rank | Tickets sold | Artist | Tour title | Year | Shows | Average attendance | Ref. |
|---|---|---|---|---|---|---|---|
| 23 | 4,900,000 | Bruce Springsteen · E Street Band | 2023–2025 Tour | 2023–2025 | 129 | 37,984 | |
| 24 | 4,900,000 | AC/DC | Black Ice World Tour | 2008–2010 | 165 | 29,697 | |
| 25 | 4,800,000 | Pink | Summer Carnival | 2023–2024 | 97 | 49,485 | |
| 26 | 4,800,000 | The Rolling Stones | Bridges to Babylon Tour | 1997–1998 | 108 | 44,444 | (Note: Other estimate attendances are 5 million.) |
| 27 | 4,700,000 | The Rolling Stones | A Bigger Bang Tour | 2005–2007 | 147 | 31,973 | |
| 28 | 4,619,021 | U2 | Vertigo Tour | 2005–2006 | 131 | 35,260 | |
| 29 | 4,559,065 | Michael Jackson | Bad World Tour | 1987–1989 | 125 | 36,473 | |
| 30 | 4,520,158 | Michael Jackson | HIStory World Tour | 1996–1997 | 82 | 55,124 | |
| 31 | 4,500,000 | Jacky Cheung | A Classic Tour | 2016–2019 | 233 | 19,313 | |
| 32 | 4,400,000 | Shakira | Las Mujeres Ya No Lloran World Tour | 2025–2026 | 124 | 35,484 | |
| 33 | 4,250,000 | Pink Floyd | A Momentary Lapse of Reason Tour | 1987–1990 | 198 | 21,465 | |
| 34 | 4,198,613 | Metallica | WorldWired Tour | 2016–2019 | 159 | 26,406 | |
| 35 | 4,150,000 | Mayday | Life Tour | 2017–2019 | 122 | 34,016 | |
| 36 | 4,129,863 | Roger Waters | The Wall Live | 2010–2013 | 220 | 18,772 | |
| 37 | 4,000,000 | Tina Turner | Break Every Rule World Tour | 1987–1988 | 218 | 18,349 | |
| 38 | 3,982,657 | U2 | PopMart Tour | 1997–1998 | 93 | 42,824 | |
| 39 | 3,757,000 | Michael Jackson | Dangerous World Tour | 1992–1993 | 69 | 54,449 | |
| 40 | 3,600,000 | Bruce Springsteen · E Street Band | Wrecking Ball World Tour | 2012–2013 | 125 | 28,800 | |
| 41 | 3,545,899 | Madonna | Sticky & Sweet Tour | 2008–2009 | 85 | 41,716 | |
| 42 | 3,500,000 | The Rolling Stones | Licks Tour | 2003–2004 | 117 | 29,915 | |
| 43 | 3,500,000 | Cher | Living Proof: The Farewell Tour | 2002–2005 | 326 | 10,736 | |

== Most-attended tours by year ==
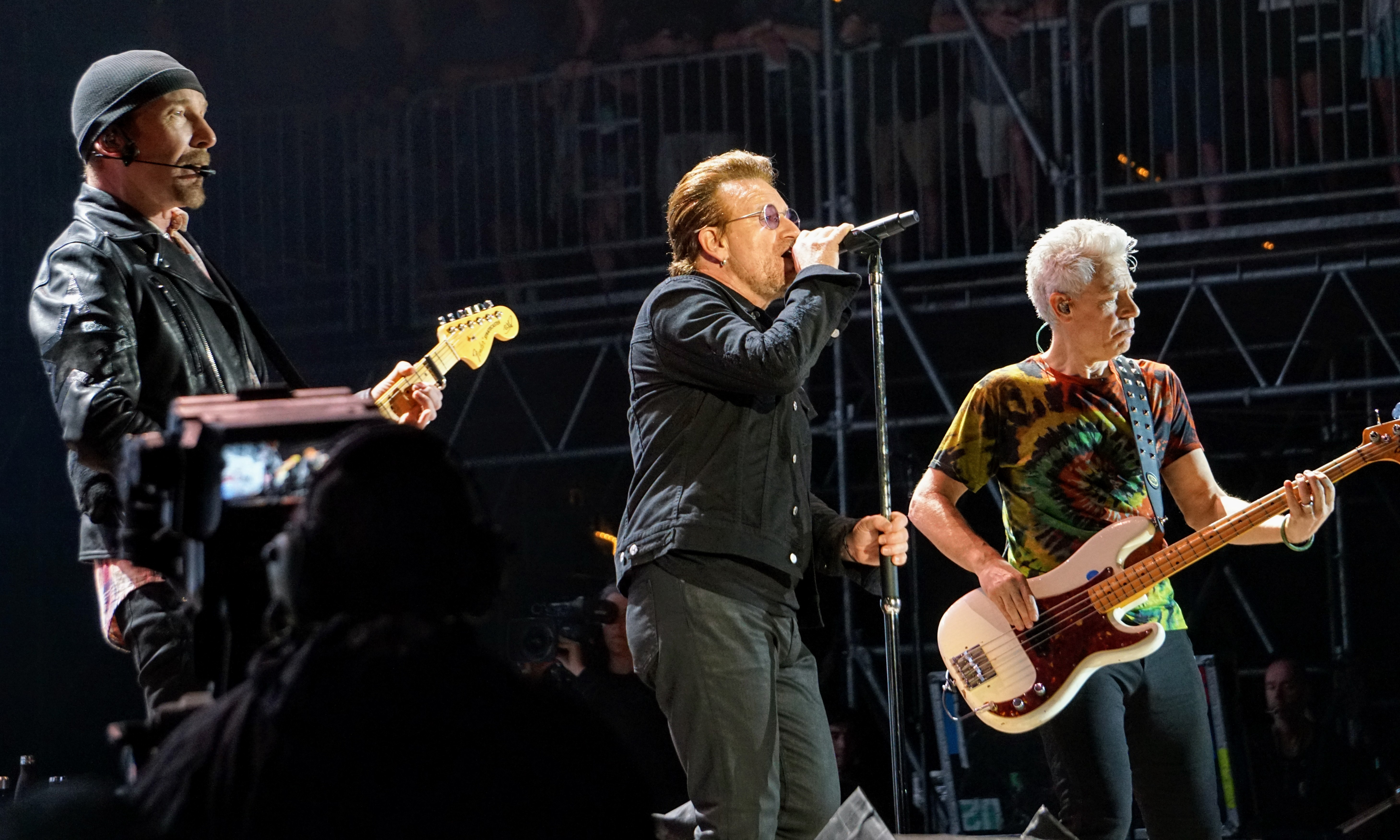
U2 on the Joshua Tree Tour 2017, one of their six that achieved the most-attended tour of the year

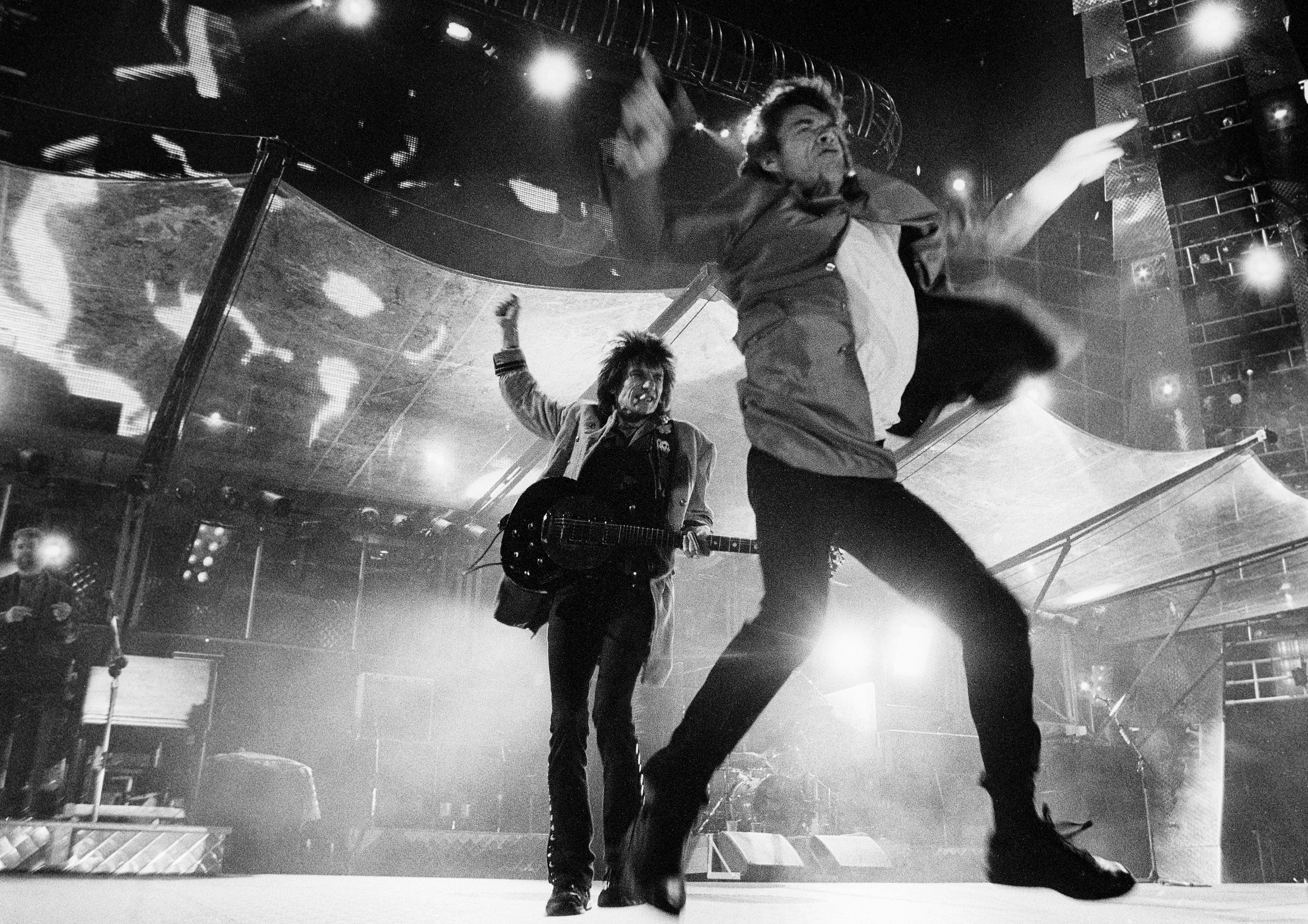
The Rolling Stones on the Voodoo Lounge Tour, one of their four that achieved the most-attended tour of the year

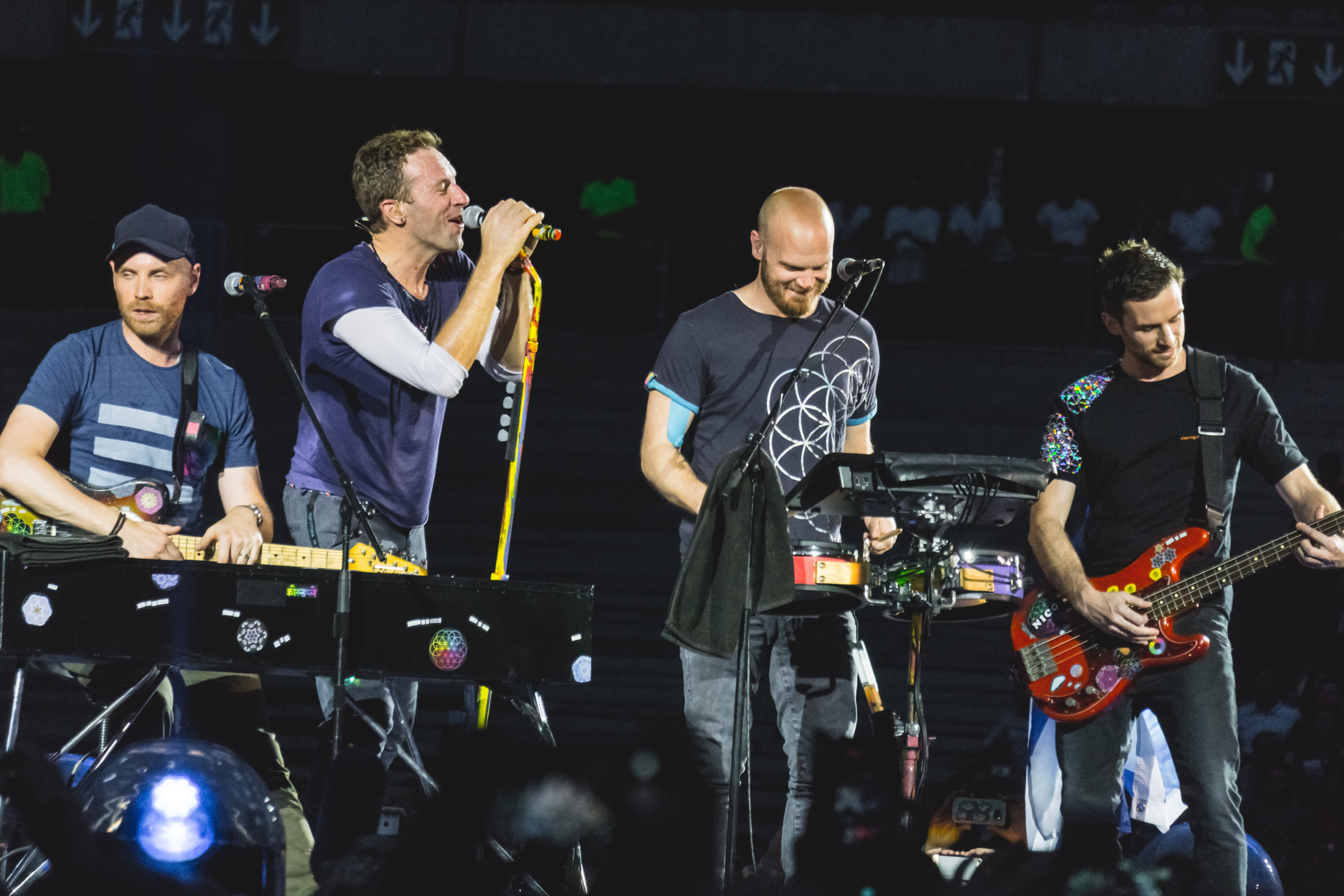
Coldplay on A Head Full of Dreams Tour, one of their three that achieved the most-attended tour of the year

Most-attended tours annually
| Year | Tickets sold | Artist | Tour title | Shows | Average attendance | Highest-grossing tour of the year | Ref. |
|---|---|---|---|---|---|---|---|
| 1995 | 4,461,075 | The Rolling Stones | Voodoo Lounge Tour | 84 | 53,108 | Yes | |
| 1996 | 1,900,000 | Garth Brooks | The Garth Brooks World Tour 1996–1998 | 121 | 15,702 | No | |
| 1997 | 2,981,357 | U2 | PopMart Tour | 70 | 42,591 | Yes | |
| 1998 | 3,538,276 | The Rolling Stones | Bridges to Babylon Tour | 82 | 43,150 | Yes | |
| 1999 | 1,800,000 | NSYNC | NSYNC in Concert | 121 | 14,876 | No | |
| 2000 | 2,400,000 | Tina Turner | Twenty Four Seven Tour | 108 | 22,222 | Yes | |
| 2001 | 2,061,248 | U2 | Elevation Tour | 106 | 19,446 | Yes | |
| 2002 | 1,359,351 | Dave Matthews Band | 2002 Tour | 67 | 20,289 | No | |
| 2003 | 3,470,945 | The Rolling Stones | Licks Tour | 115 | 30,182 | Yes | |
| 2004 | 1,474,156 | Prince | Musicology Live 2004ever | 99 | 14,890 | No | |
| 2005 | 3,000,000 | U2 | Vertigo Tour | 90 | 33,333 | Yes | |
| 2006 | 3,499,405 | The Rolling Stones | A Bigger Bang Tour | 110 | 31,813 | Yes | |
| 2007 | 1,858,456 | The Police | Reunion Tour | 66 | 28,158 | Yes | |
| 2008 | 2,340,000 | Madonna | Sticky & Sweet Tour | 58 | 40,345 | Yes | |
| 2009 | 3,071,290 | U2 | 360° Tour | 44 | 69,802 | Yes | |
| 2010 | 1,909,234 | Bon Jovi | The Circle Tour | 80 | 23,865 | Yes | |
| 2011 | 2,887,972 | U2 | 360° Tour | 44 | 65,636 | Yes | |
| 2012 | 2,286,395 | Bruce Springsteen · E Street Band | Wrecking Ball World Tour | 81 | 28,227 | No | |
| 2013 | 2,657,502 | Bon Jovi | Because We Can | 102 | 26,054 | Yes | |
| 2014 | 3,439,563 | One Direction | Where We Are Tour | 69 | 49,849 | Yes | |
| 2015 | 2,364,390 | One Direction | On the Road Again Tour | 85 | 27,816 | No | |
| 2016 | 2,670,000 | Coldplay | A Head Full of Dreams Tour | 60 | 44,607 | No | |
| 2017 | 2,713,136 | U2 | The Joshua Tree Tour 2017 | 50 | 54,263 | Yes | |
| 2018 | 4,860,482 | Ed Sheeran | ÷ Tour | 94 | 51,707 | Yes | |
| 2019 | 2,455,718 | Ed Sheeran | ÷ Tour | 51 | 48,151 | No | |
| 2020 | 885,740 | Trans-Siberian Orchestra | Christmas Eve and Other Stories Tour | 91 | 9,733 | No | |
| 2021 | 669,051 | Harry Styles | Love On Tour | 39 | 17,155 | No | |
| 2022 | 3,802,812 | Coldplay | Music of the Spheres World Tour | 64 | 59,419 | Yes | |
| 2023 | 4,349,363 | Taylor Swift | The Eras Tour | 60 | 72,489 | Yes | |
| 2024 | 5,210,054 | Taylor Swift | The Eras Tour | 80 | 65,126 | Yes | |
| 2025 | 2,918,405 | Coldplay | Music of the Spheres World Tour | 50 | 58,368 | No | |

== Most tickets sold in a day ==
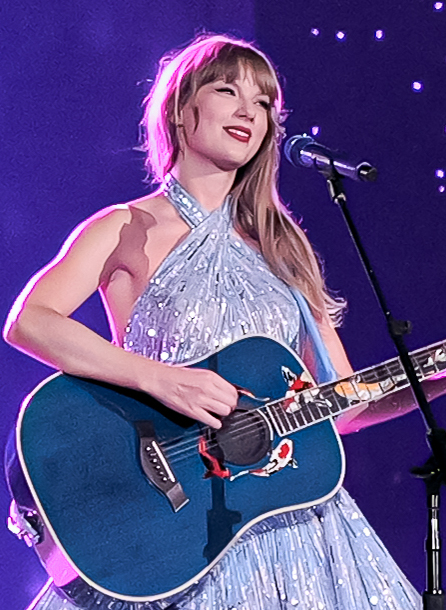
Taylor Swift at the Eras Tour, the most selling tour in a single day with 2.4 million tickets for its first US leg

Tours with the most tickets sold in a day
| Year | Tickets sold | Artist | Tour title | Location | Ref. |
|---|---|---|---|---|---|
| 2023 | 2,400,000 | Taylor Swift | The Eras Tour * | North America | |
| 2026 | 2,100,000 | Bruno Mars | The Romantic Tour | Europe · North America | |
| 2005 | 1,600,000 | Robbie Williams | Close Encounters Tour * | Europe | |
| 2024 | 1,500,000 | AC/DC | Power Up Tour | Europe | |
| 2022 | 1,400,000 | Coldplay | Music of the Spheres World Tour | Europe | |
| 2025 | 1,400,000 | Oasis | Oasis Live '25 Tour | Europe | |
| 2010 | 1,340,000 | Take That | Progress Live | Europe | |
| 2017 | 1,100,000 | U2 | The Joshua Tree Tour 2017 | Europe · North America | |
| 2021 | 1,000,000 | Coldplay | Music of the Spheres World Tour | Europe | |
| 2016 | 1,100,000 | Guns N' Roses | Not in This Lifetime... Tour | Europe | |
| 2016 | 1,000,000 | Bruno Mars | 24K Magic World Tour | Europe · North America | |
| 2000 | 1,000,000 | NSYNC | No Strings Attached Tour * | North America | |
| 2024 | 950,000 | Shakira | Las Mujeres Ya No Lloran World Tour | North America · South America | |
| 2024 | 800,000 | Coldplay | Music of the Spheres World Tour | Europe | |
| 2023 | 800,000 | RBD | Soy Rebelde Tour | North America · South America | |
| 2017 | 710,000 | Ed Sheeran | ÷ Tour | Oceania | |
| 2024 | 700,000 | Coldplay | Music of the Spheres World Tour | North America | |
| 2025 | 600,000 | Bad Bunny | Debí Tirar Más Fotos World Tour | Europe | |
| 2023 | 600,000 | Madonna | The Celebration Tour | Europe · North America | |
| 2009 | 500,000 | AC/DC | Black Ice World Tour | Oceania | |

== See also ==
- List of most-attended concerts
- List of most-attended concert series at a single venue
- List of highest-grossing live music artists
- List of highest-grossing concert tours
- List of highest-grossing concert tours by women
- List of highest-grossing concert tours by Latin artists
- List of highest-grossing concert series at a single venue
