= Garth Brooks: Live in Kansas City =

- Tour by Garth Brooks
- Start date: November 5, 2007
- End date: November 14, 2007
- No. of shows: 9

Garth Brooks concert chronology
- The Garth Brooks World Tour (1996–1998); Garth Brooks: Live in Kansas City (2007); Garth Brooks: Live in LA (2008)

Garth Brooks: Live in Kansas City was a series of concerts held by American country pop singer Garth Brooks from November 5 through November 14, 2007. Among the first concerts held at the newly opened Sprint Center (now T-Mobile Center) in Kansas City, Missouri, the nine-show series were Brooks' first multi-concert performances since his 1996–1998 world tour.

== Background ==
In late 2007, Garth Brooks was slated to release The Ultimate Hits, a compilation and Brooks' first album featuring new music since 2001. The album release coincided with the Sprint Center's opening, prompting Brooks' agreement to one promotional concert; however, ticket demand was extremely high, resulting in an additional eight concerts added. All concerts, consisting of nearly 160,000 tickets, sold out in less than two hours.

The final concert of the series, held on November 14, 2007, was simulcast live via National CineMedia on more than 300 movie theaters throughout the United States.

== Set list ==
This set list is representative of the performance on November 14, 2007. It does not represent all concerts for the duration of the series.

1. "The Fever"
2. "Two of a Kind, Workin' on a Full House"
3. "Rodeo"
4. "Good Ride Cowboy"
5. "The Thunder Rolls"
6. "Shameless"
7. "We Shall Be Free"
8. "Unanswered Prayers"
9. "The River"
10. "Papa Loved Mama"
11. "The Beaches of Cheyenne"
12. "Callin' Baton Rouge"
13. "More Than a Memory"
14. "Friends in Low Places"
15. "The Dance"

Encores

16. "Ain't Goin' Down ('Til the Sun Comes Up)"
17. "That Summer"
18. "Much Too Young (To Feel This Damn Old)"
19. "Two Pina Coladas"
20. "Unanswered Prayers"
21. "Fire and Rain" (James Taylor cover)
22. "Turn the Page" (Bob Seger cover)
23. "Unwound" (George Strait cover)
24. "The Fireman" (George Strait cover)
25. "Amarillo By Morning" (George Strait cover)
26. "Piano Man" (Billy Joel cover)
27. "American Pie" (Don McLean cover)

== Tour dates ==
Date	City	Country	Venue	Tickets Sold / Available	Revenue
November 5, 2007	Kansas City	United States	Sprint Center	164,080 / 164,080	$5,058,470
November 6, 2007	Kansas City	United States	Sprint Center	164,080 / 164,080	$5,058,470
November 7, 2007	Kansas City	United States	Sprint Center	164,080 / 164,080	$5,058,470
November 8, 2007	Kansas City	United States	Sprint Center	164,080 / 164,080	$5,058,470
November 9, 2007	Kansas City	United States	Sprint Center	164,080 / 164,080	$5,058,470
November 10, 2007	Kansas City	United States	Sprint Center	164,080 / 164,080	$5,058,470
November 11, 2007	Kansas City	United States	Sprint Center	164,080 / 164,080	$5,058,470
November 12, 2007	Kansas City	United States	Sprint Center	164,080 / 164,080	$5,058,470
November 14, 2007	Kansas City	United States	Sprint Center	164,080 / 164,080	$5,058,470

== Personnel ==
- Robert Bailey – backing vocals
- Bruce Bouton – pedal steel guitar, lap steel guitar
- Garth Brooks – vocals, acoustic guitar, electric guitar on "Callin' Baton Rouge"
- Stephanie Davis – acoustic guitar, backing vocals
- David Gant – keyboards
- Mark Greenwood – bass guitar, backing vocals
- Vicki Hampton – backing vocals
- Gordon Kennedy – electric guitar
- Jimmy Mattingly – fiddle, acoustic guitar
- Mike Palmer – drums, percussion
- Karyn Rochelle – backing vocals

== See also ==
- List of Garth Brooks concert tours
