= T-Mobile Center =

Multi-purpose arena in Kansas City, Missouri, US

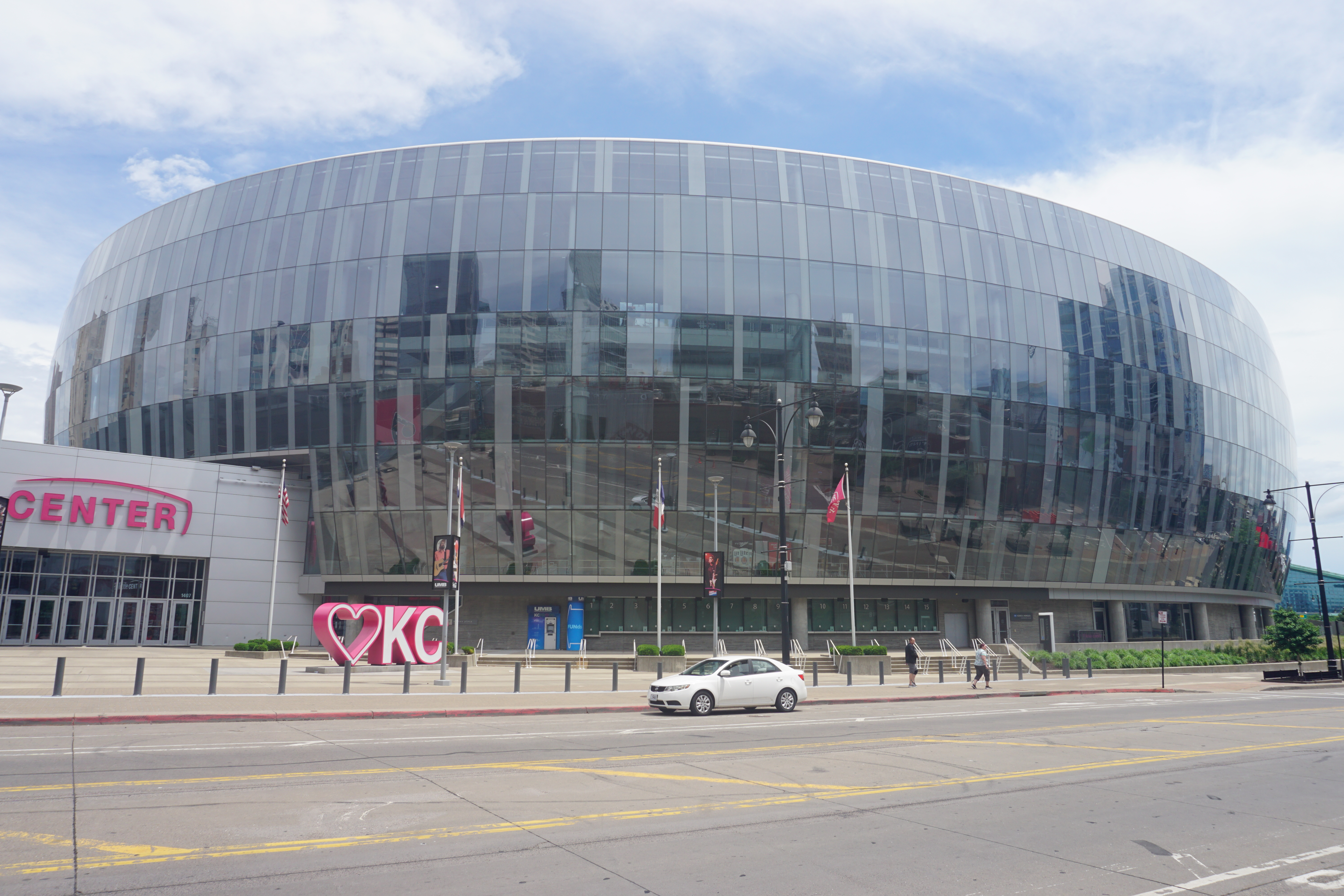

- Location within Missouri Location within the United States
- Former names: Sprint Center (2007–2020)
- Address: 1407 Grand Boulevard
- Location: Kansas City, Missouri, U.S.
- Coordinates: 39°05′51″N 94°34′49″W
- Owner: City of Kansas City
- Operator: Anschutz Entertainment Group (AEG)
- Capacity: Arena football: 17,297; Basketball: 18,972; Ice hockey: 17,544; Concerts: 19,252
- Surface: Multi-surface
- Record attendance: 19,655 (August 31, 2023 - Zach Bryan Concert)
- Public transit: KC Streetcar at Power & Light

Construction
- Groundbreaking: June 24, 2005
- Opened: October 10, 2007; 19 years ago
- Cost: US$276 million
- Architects: Downtown Arena Design Team: HOK Sport; 360 Architecture; Ellerbe Becket; Rafael Architects
- Project manager: ICON Venue Group
- Structural engineer: Walter P Moore
- Services engineers: M-E Engineers, Inc.
- General contractor: Mortenson Construction

Tenants
- Kansas City Command (AFL) (2008, 2011–2012); Kansas City Outlaws (PBR) (2022–present)

Website
- t-mobilecenter.com

T-Mobile Center (formerly Sprint Center) is a multi-purpose arena in downtown Kansas City, Missouri, United States. It is located at the intersection of 14th Street and Grand Boulevard on the east side of the Power & Light District. It has effectively become the city's primary indoor arena, a role previously held by Kemper Arena, which had been built in 1974 a few miles away in the West Bottoms neighborhood.

== History ==
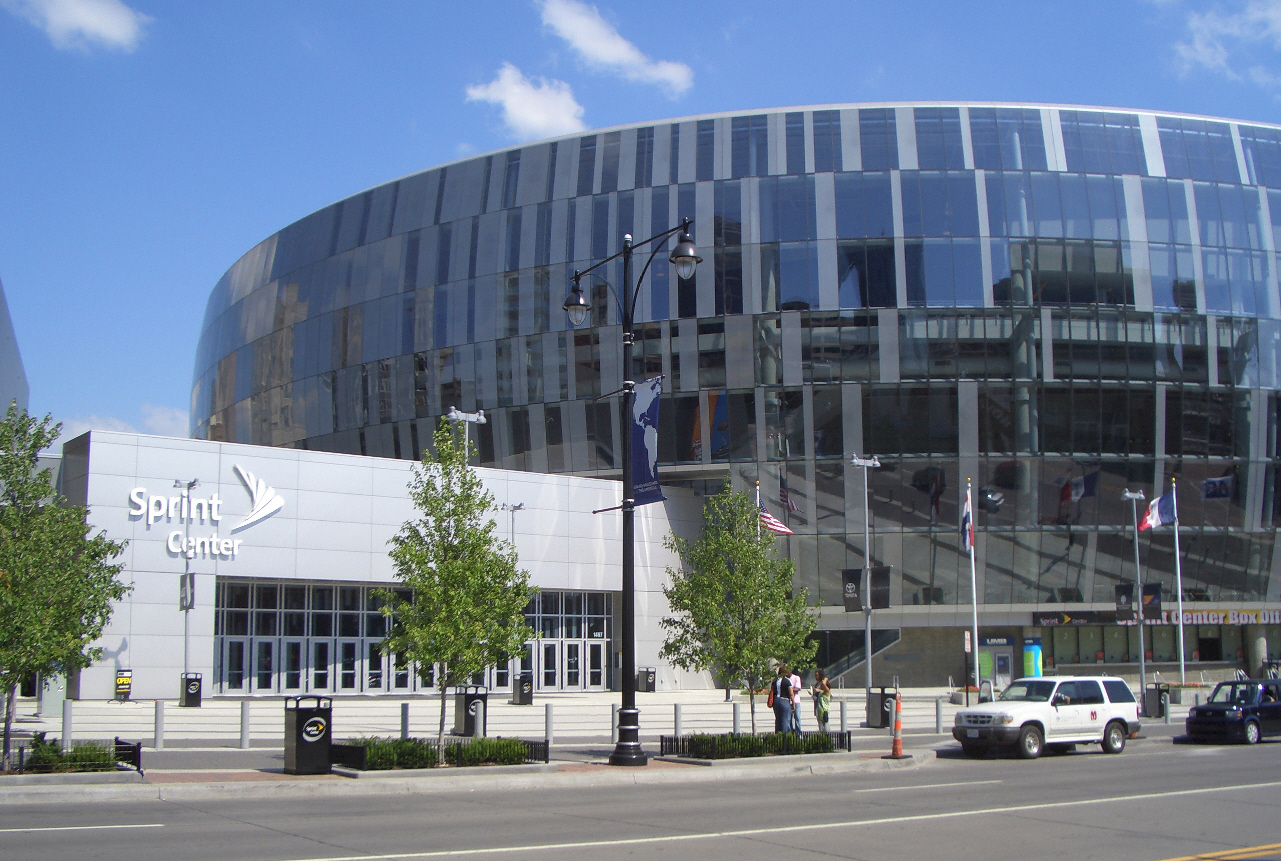
The arena's Grand Boulevard entrance in 2008, when it was known as Sprint Center

The arena is owned by the city of Kansas City, Missouri. The final design was selected in August 2005, from the Downtown Arena Design Team, which was a collaboration of the architectural firms Populous, 360 Architecture, Rafael Architects, and Ellerbe Becket. The construction manager was M.A. Mortenson Company, based in Minneapolis, Minnesota. Groundbreaking was on June 24, 2005, and construction was completed on October 11, 2007, at US$276 million (equivalent to $429 million in 2025).

The complete exterior glass façade system, all metal panels for the adjacent buildings and all accessory metal cladding, was custom designed, detailed, and supplied by Overgaard Ltd. Hong Kong to Architectural Wall Systems, the Des Moines, Iowa based glazing contractor who installed the building envelope. In total there are approximately 13,000 square meters (140,000 sq ft) of double insulated glass and 5,000 square meters (54,000 sq ft) of painted aluminum curtain wall panels. There are roughly 200 tons of system profiles and accessories. All of the 2,404 individual glass units on the main building were produced sequentially and completely assembled prior to shipping. The 5 million pounds of rebar was detailed, fabricated, and supplied by The Carter-Waters Corporation of Kansas City. The arena features a work of public art, The Moons, by Chris Doyle, commissioned by the Kansas City Municipal Arts Commission (KCMAC). The interior has a 360-degree LED video screen. The arena seats over 19,000 people and has 72 suites. Connected to its north side is the College Basketball Experience, which includes the National Collegiate Basketball Hall of Fame.

In early 2006, Anschutz Entertainment Group appointed Brenda Tinnen as the facility's general manager, following her role as senior vice president of Los Angeles's Staples Center. Media coverage credited her leadership with establishing the venue's initial commercial operations and securing high-profile touring acts. Sprint Center opened on October 10, 2007, inaugurated by an Elton John concert three days later. During the venue's inaugural month, Garth Brooks performed nine consecutive sold-out concerts, later documented in the concert film Garth Brooks: Live in Kansas City, marking his return to arena performances during a period of semi-retirement. On stage, Brooks acknowledged Tinnen for facilitating the engagement, and in recognition of the milestone, a commemorative banner was raised in the arena rafters.

In April 2020, T-Mobile US became the naming rights partner by completing a merger with Sprint Corporation. On July 9, 2020, Sprint Center was officially renamed to T-Mobile Center. Changes include an entrance specifically for T-Mobile customers, a lounge with tables that can charge smartphones wirelessly, charging stations all over the arena, T-Mobile 5G coverage, and a monument outside saying "Heart KC".

== Gallery ==
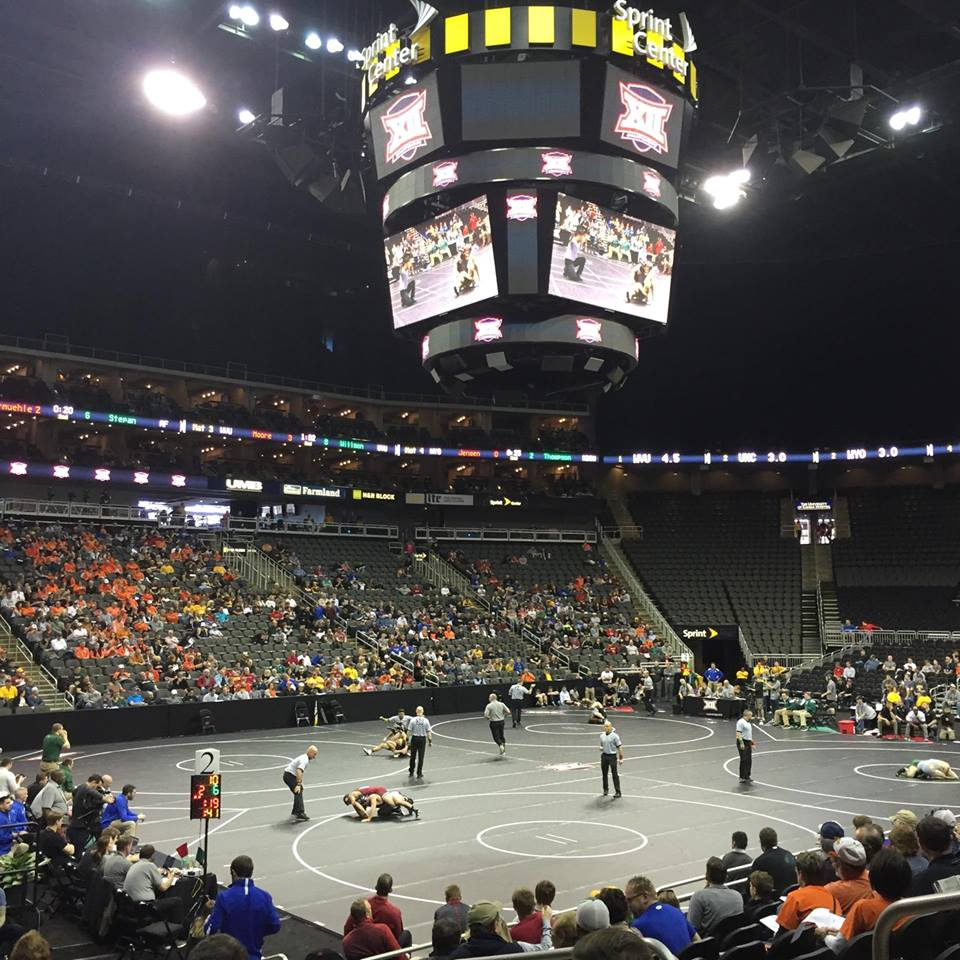
2016 Big 12 Wrestling Championship.

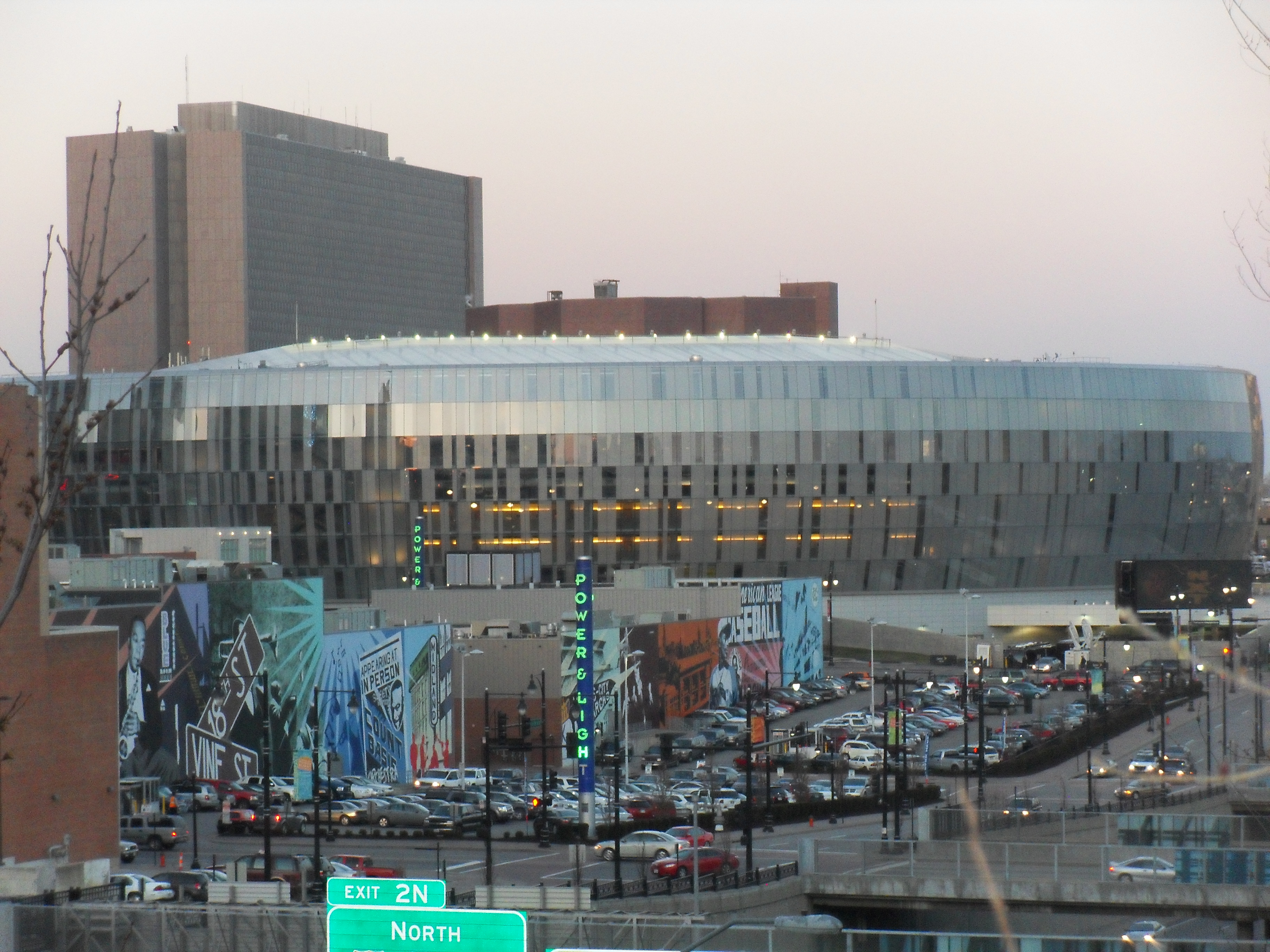
The arena and Power & Light District, from the convention center in 2011.

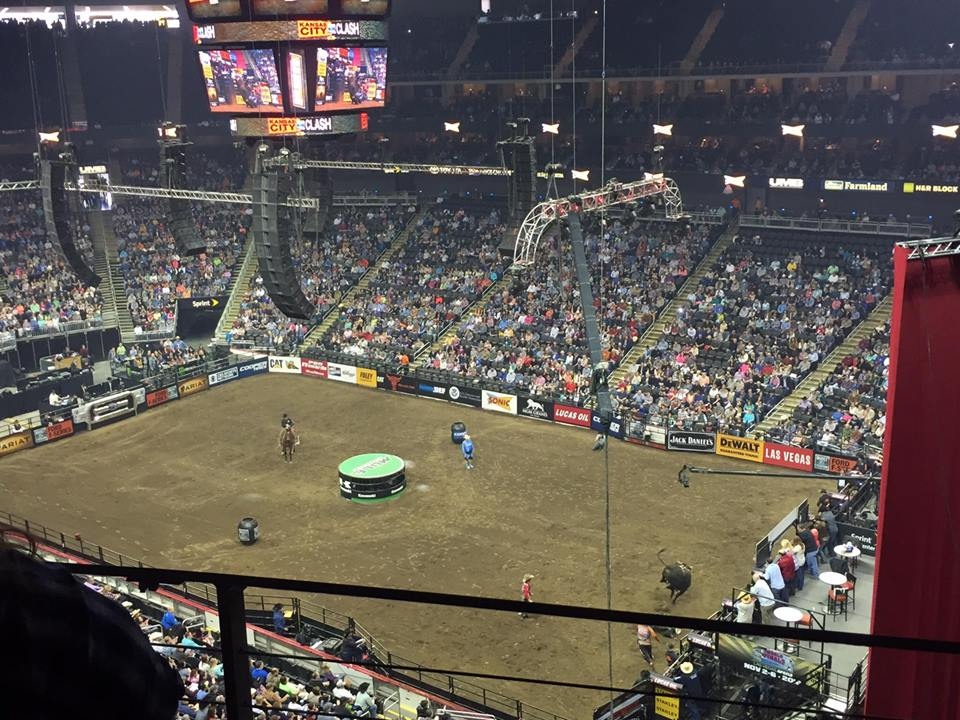
2016 Built Ford Tough PBR Kansas City Clash

== Events ==
Since the arena's construction, various city officials of Kansas City have been in discussions with the National Hockey League (NHL) and the National Basketball Association (NBA) about possible expansion or relocation of a professional hockey and/or basketball franchise for the arena; however, neither league has yet approved a team to play in T-Mobile Center (the arena and relocation of its franchise was used as leverage by the Pittsburgh Penguins in 2006 to get the current-day PPG Paints Arena in Pittsburgh built).

The arena hosted the Big 12 men's basketball tournament in 2008 and in every year since 2010. It hosted the first and second rounds of the 2009 and 2013 NCAA men's tournaments, plus the regional rounds of the 2017 NCAA men's tournament and again in 2019 and 2023. In 2010 and 2018 the Kansas City regional of the NCAA Women's Division I Basketball Tournament was held here. Additionally, the Kansas Jayhawks men's basketball team traditionally plays a regular season non-conference game each year at the arena; between the Big 12 tournament and regular home games, the arena has gained the nickname "Allen Fieldhouse East" among KU fans. Missouri and Kansas State also occasionally play non-conference games at T-Mobile Center. To better accommodate the teams, the arena's main basketball court has a modular design where the logo at center court can be changed to that of the Jayhawks, Tigers, Wildcats, or left neutral.

The arena held Missouri's first UFC event for UFC on Fox: Johnson vs. Reis on April 15, 2017. On April 15, 2023, the UFC returned to the arena for UFC on ESPN: Holloway vs. Allen. The promotion returned on April 26, 2025 for UFC on ESPN: Machado Garry vs. Prates. Professional wrestling events have occasionally been held at T-Mobile Center, including WWE, and All Elite Wrestling. It hosted the former Kansas City Command of the Arena Football League (AFL).

The venue was a regular stop for the Professional Bull Riders (PBR)'s Premier Series for several years. Since 2022, it serves as the home venue of the PBR's Kansas City Outlaws during the PBR Team Series season held in the summer and autumn. In April 2025, in recognition of the acquisition of PBR by TKO Group as part of a reorganization by Endeavor, all three of TKO's main divisions—PBR, UFC, and WWE—hosted events on April 24, 26, and 28. The events, billed as TKO Takeover, consisted of a PBR Knockout Missouri vs. The World event, UFC on ESPN: Machado Garry vs. Prates, and WWE Raw.
