= Dive Bar Tour (Garth Brooks) =

2019–21 concert tour by Garth Brooks

- Promotional tour by Garth Brooks
- Start date: July 15, 2019
- End date: December 16, 2021
- Legs: 1
- No. of shows: 8

Garth Brooks concert chronology
- Stadium Tour (2019–2022); Dive Bar Tour (2019–2021); Garth Brooks/Plus One (2023–2024)

The Dive Bar Tour was a promotional concert tour by American country music singer Garth Brooks. Sponsored by Seagram, the tour was launched in support of Brooks's single "Dive Bar" (a duet with Blake Shelton) and consisted of eight performances at small-capacity music venues across the United States. Announced in July 2019, the tour ran concurrently with The Garth Brooks Stadium Tour, an intimate contrast to his stadium production. Tickets were distributed exclusively through local country radio station promotional contests. Originally scheduled as a seven show run in 2019 and early 2020, the tour was suspended due to the COVID-19 pandemic and officially concluded in December 2021.

== Background ==
On July 7, 2019, Brooks announced the Dive Bar Tour in support of his single with Blake Shelton, "Dive Bar", via Facebook Live.

Despite already embarking on his Stadium Tour throughout North America, Brooks visited seven cities for the Dive Bar Tour, performing at various dive bars throughout the country. Tickets for each show were only available via contest through each city's country radio stations. The venture was designed as a promotional counterpart to his concurrent stadium dates, returning Brooks to small capacity dance halls and historic honky-tonks such as Gruene Hall in Texas and Buck Owens Crystal Palace in California.

In promotion of the tour and single, Brooks' Chicago performance of "Dive Bar" was aired on Jimmy Kimmel Live!. Following seven performances across 2019 and early 2020, the tour was suspended due to venue restrictions associated with the COVID-19 pandemic. The tour concluded with an eighth date in San Jose in December 2021.

== Critical response ==
Steve Johnson of the Chicago Tribune praised the tour, stating, "Brooks fist-pumped, finger-pointed and humbly hat-doffed his way through a honky-tonk jukebox worth of old hits, one new single (twice) and some touching homages to country legends in a show that lasted a surprisingly generous 100 minutes." He continued, "if you accept that the golden ratio in concert-going is size of talent to size of room, then this one was special, a night to get close and personal with a performer typically seen from, at best, binocular distance in a hockey arena." San Antonio Express-News' coverage of the Gruene Hall performance reported crowds gathering outside the venue to listen to the show, noting the set list relied primarily on audience requests and country covers, rather than the fixed staging of his stadium tour.

== Set list ==
This set list is representative of the performance of October 16, 2019 in Sanford. It does not represent all concerts for the duration of the series.

1. "All Day Long"
2. "Rodeo"
3. "Two of a Kind, Workin' on a Full House"
4. "Two Piña Coladas"
5. "The River"
6. "Much Too Young (To Feel This Damn Old)"
7. "To Make You Feel My Love"
8. "Unanswered Prayers"
9. "Ain't Going Down ('Til the Sun Comes Up)"
10. "That Summer"
11. "Fishin' in the Dark" (Nitty Gritty Dirt Band cover)
12. "The Thunder Rolls"
13. "Callin' Baton Rouge"
14. "Dive Bar"
15. "Friends in Low Places"
16. "The Dance"

== Shows ==
List of concerts, showing date, city, country, and venue
Date	City	Country	Venue
North America
July 15, 2019	Chicago	United States	Joe's on Weed Street
August 15, 2019	Bakersfield	United States	Buck Owens Crystal Palace
September 23, 2019	New Braunfels	United States	Gruene Hall
October 16, 2019	Sanford	United States	The Barn
October, 28, 2019	Rootstown	United States	Dusty Armadillo
December, 2, 2019	Mount Laurel	United States	Prospector’s Steakhouse
February 5, 2020	Foxborough	United States	Six String Grill & Stage
December 16, 2021	San Jose	United States	Club Rodeo

== Personnel ==
Personnel adapted from the December 2, 2019 concert in Mount Laurel. It may not reflect the personnel from each concert on the tour.

- Garth Brooks – vocals, acoustic guitar
- Dave Gant – keyboards, musical direction
- Mark Greenwood – bass guitar, backing vocals
- Jimmy Mattingly – fiddle, acoustic guitar
- Steve McClure – pedal steel guitar, electric guitar
- Mike Palmer – drums, percussion
