= Dive Bar =

Dive Bar may refer to:

- Dive bar, a small, unglamorous, eclectic, old-style drinking establishment with inexpensive drinks
- Dive Bar (Garth Brooks and Blake Shelton song), 2018
- Dive Bar (Gord Bamford song), 2019

== See also ==
- Dive Bar Tour (disambiguation)
