= Garth: Live at Notre Dame =

- Directed by: Jon Small
- Country of origin: United States
- Original language: English

Production
- Executive producer: Garth Brooks
- Producer: Jon Small
- Running time: 83 minutes
- Production company: Picture Vision Pictures

Original release
- Network: CBS
- Release: December 2, 2018

Garth: Live at Notre Dame was a 2018 American concert event and primetime television special starring country music artist Garth Brooks. Held on October 20, 2018, at Notre Dame Stadium in Notre Dame, Indiana, the performance marked the first live concert held at the historic venue in its history. The concert was filmed live in front of a sold-out audience of over 84,000 attendees amidst freezing rain and snow conditions.

Directed by Jon Small and executive produced by Brooks, the resulting two hour television special premiered on CBS on December 2, 2018, drawing nearly ten million viewers. The performance served as both a standalone television event and the creative testing ground for The Garth Brooks Stadium Tour, which Brooks announced during press events in the lead-up to the show.

== Background and development ==
In July 2018, the University of Notre Dame announced that Garth Brooks would perform the first-ever live musical concert at Notre Dame Stadium in its 88 year history. The venue, having opened in 1930, had previously been reserved exclusively for athletic contests, commencements, and religious ceremonies. When tickets went on sale on September 14, 2018, all 84,000 seats sold out in less than two hours, establishing a venue record for single day sales.

Following the ticket sellout, network executives at CBS partnered with Brooks to film the concert for a primetime television broadcast, marking his first network special since 2013. Staged in-the-round on an open air central field setup, the performance took place on October 20, 2018, under severe weather conditions involving freezing rain, wind gusts, and snow, which delayed production setup by over an hour. The event served as the functional precursor and creative testing ground for The Stadium Tour, which Brooks officially announced during a press conference held at the venue during show week.

== Critical reception ==
The live performance was generally positive regarding Brooks's high energy catalog delivery, though reviewers noted that production filming requirements compromised the natural flow of the show. Local media commended the audience's resilience through freezing rain and weather delays, praising the high energy communal singalongs on signature tracks. However, The Irish Rover's Steve Larkin criticized the frequent operational pauses, directing audience reactions, and repeating song segments for television coverage, noting that the filming instructions occasionally disrupted the performance's momentum.

The primetime broadcast on CBS received favorable commercial and critical responses, with industry outlets highlighting its strong ratings performance. Debuting to nearly nine million viewers, reviews praised Small's sweeping 360-degree camera work, observing the broadcast effectively captured the visual scale of the stadium, while translating the acoustic request encore to an intimate focal point for home audiences.

== Set list ==
The show featured Brooks' 1990s hit songs, along with newer songs, a mixture of covers, and a fan request set.

Main set
1. "All Day Long"
2. "That Summer"
3. "Two of a Kind, Workin' on a Full House"
4. "The River"
5. "Papa Loved Mama"
6. "Two Piña Coladas"
7. "Unanswered Prayers"
8. "Night Moves" (Bob Seger cover)
9. "Standing Outside the Fire"
10. "Rodeo"
11. "(Sometimes You’ve Got to Die To) Live Again"
12. "Let It Be" / "Hey Jude" (The Beatles covers)
13. "Ain't Goin' Down ('til the Sun Comes Up)"
14. "The Thunder Rolls"
15. "Callin' Baton Rouge"
16. "Friends in Low Places"
17. "The Dance"

"Housekeeping" fan request set

18. "She's Every Woman"
19. "The Red Strokes"
20. "Ireland"
21. "More Than a Memory"
22. "Guy Goin' Nowhere" (Ashley McBryde cover)

Encore set

23. "Turn the Page" (Bob Seger cover)
24. "American Pie" (Don McLean cover)

== Personnel ==
- Robert Bailey – backing vocals
- Bruce Bouton – pedal steel guitar, lap steel guitar, electric guitar
- Garth Brooks – vocals, acoustic guitar, electric guitar
- Steve Cox – keyboards
- David Gant – keyboards
- Johnny Garcia – electric guitar
- Mark Greenwood – bass guitar, backing vocals
- Vicki Hampton – backing vocals
- Jimmy Mattingly – fiddle, acoustic guitar
- Mike Palmer – drums, percussion
- Karyn Rochelle – backing vocals, acoustic guitar
