= That's What Cowboys Do =

2021 song by Garth Brooks

Single by Garth Brooks

from the album Fun
- Released: June 29, 2021
- Genre: Country
- Length: 3:33
- Label: Pearl
- Songwriters: John Martin; Mitch Rossell; Garth Brooks
- Producer: Garth Brooks

Garth Brooks singles chronology
"Shallow" (2020)	"That's What Cowboys Do" (2021)	"Rodeo Man" (2023)

"That's What Cowboys Do" is a song by American country music singer Garth Brooks. It was released on June 29, 2021, as the fifth single from Brooks' fourteenth studio album Fun. Brooks co-wrote the song with John Martin and Mitch Rossell.

== Background ==
In an interview, Brooks said: "It was written for the boys from Midland. 'Cause I thought they would kill it. We sat down and wrote something for them, because they do a lot of George Strait-feeling stuff."

== Content ==
The song was described by CMT as a story about "timeless tale of love, heartbreak and the rodeo" and a rodeo cowboy who "falls for, then leaves, their love interest". Chris Parton of Sounds like Nashville felt that the "pure-country ballad" song features "a gentle sway and a timeless theme. Brooks plays a cowboy who can't be tamed, drifting from one rodeo arena and one bed to the next."

== Critical reception ==
Katie Maloney of Outsider commented that the song has "90s country vibes". Robyn Collins of Taste of Country described it as "a traditional country tune that features slide guitars and fiddles so classic that listeners can almost see boot-wearing couples making their way around the dance floor.

In November 2022, the song was honored as one of the Most Performed Country Songs of 2021 at the 60th Annual ASCAP Country Music Awards.

== Charts ==
=== Weekly charts ===
Weekly chart performance for "That's What Cowboys Do"
Chart (2021)	Peak position
US Country Airplay (Billboard)	29
US Hot Country Songs (Billboard)	33

=== Year-end charts ===
Year-end chart performance for "That's What Cowboys Do"
Chart (2021)	Position
US Hot Country Songs (Billboard)	94
