= America's National Parks =

America's National Parks may refer to:

- America's National Parks (album), a 2016 album by Wadada Leo Smith
- America's National Parks (TV series), a 2022 nature documentary television series
- List of national parks of the United States
