= Rodeo Man =

2023 single by Garth Brooks and Ronnie Dunn

Single by Garth Brooks and Ronnie Dunn

from the album Time Traveler
- Released: November 6, 2023
- Genre: Country
- Length: 3:01
- Label: Pearl
- Songwriters: Ronnie Dunn; Phil O'Donnell
- Producers: Garth Brooks; Ronnie Dunn

Garth Brooks singles chronology
"That's What Cowboys Do" (2021)	"Rodeo Man" (2023)

Ronnie Dunn singles chronology
"Broken Neon Hearts" (2022)	"Rodeo Man" (2023)	"Never Gonna Be" (2025)

Rodeo Man is a song by American country music singers Garth Brooks and Ronnie Dunn. Released as a single on November 6, 2023, it was included on Brooks' album Time Traveler. Dunn co-wrote the song with Phil O'Donnell.

== Background ==
Brooks' twelfth studio album, Time Traveler, which includes "Rodeo Man", was released on November 7, 2023 as part of The Limited Series, a seven disc boxed set sold exclusively through Bass Pro Shops. Brooks told Billboard that Dunn sent him the song while the two were exchanging music. Brooks suggested adding fiddle and pedal steel, recording a version to show Dunn the changes. Dunn then suggested making the song a duet, and Brooks said the final recording combined their tracks.

== Critical reception ==
Taste of Country described the song as "rollicking", a fast-paced account of a day in the life of people who work in rodeo. Chris DeVille of Stereogum described the song as a raucous, line dance-ready track reminiscent of 1990s country radio.

== Commercial performance ==
Country Aircheck reported that the song received 69 radio adds in its first week, leading the Country Aircheck/Mediabase Add Board that week.

== Charts ==
=== Weekly charts ===
Chart (2024)	Peak position
US Country Airplay (Billboard)	26

=== Year-end charts ===
Chart (2024)	Position
US Country Airplay (Billboard)	74
