= Time Traveler (album) =

Studio album by Garth Brooks
- Released: November 7, 2023
- Studios: Allentown Studios (Nashville, Tennessee); Blackbird (Nashville, Tennessee)
- Genre: Country
- Length: 38:51
- Label: Pearl
- Producer: Garth Brooks

Garth Brooks chronology
Fun (2020)	Time Traveler (2023)

Singles from Time Traveler
- 1. "Rodeo Man" Released: November 6, 2023

Time Traveler is the twelfth studio album by American country musician Garth Brooks, originally released exclusively through Bass Pro Shops on November 7, 2023, and now available to stream on Amazon Music. The album completes Brooks' most recent Limited Series collection and is part of a box set along with the other releases since Brooks came out of retirement in 2014: Man Against Machine (2014), Gunslinger (2016), Triple Live (2018), and Fun (2020). The album explores the history of country across ten tracks and has received positive reviews from critics.

== Recording and release ==
Lead single "Rodeo Man" was a song presented to Brooks by Ronnie Dunn and the two recorded it as a duet for this album. To promote the release, Brooks did in-person visits to Bass Pro Shops. “St Paul/Minneapolis (A True Story)” was inspired by an actual encounter Brooks had with a stranger.

== Reception ==
At Stereogum, Chris DeVille called "Rodeo Man" "like a '90s country radio hit, raucous and line-dance-ready, as if the last three decades never happened" and compared it to Brooks & Dunn. Steven Hyden of Uproxx reviewed the Limited Series box set and criticized the sales tactic, but stated that "Time Traveler is a lot better than a Garth Brooks album released exclusively to Bass Pro Shops in 2023 has any right to be" and praised the music for sounding like Brooks' 1990s output. Writing for USA Today, Melissa Ruggieri chose "Only Country Music" and "Pleasure in the Pain" as standout tracks for the former's ability to show Brooks' devotion to the genre and the latter's subtle ability to make "a statement that sometimes, feeling bad is the only way to eventually feel better".

Time Traveler became available for streaming on Amazon Music on September 6, 2024.

== Track listing ==
Time Traveler track listing
No.	Title	Writer(s)	Length
1.	"Me Without You"	Garth Brooks, Kent Blazy, Mitch Rossell	3:49
2.	"Rodeo Man" (featuring Ronnie Dunn)	Ronnie Dunn, Phil O'Donnell	3:01
3.	"Only Country Music"	Brooks, Ashley Gorley, Matt Rossi	3:34
4.	"St Paul/Minneapolis (A True Story)"	Brooks	3:58
5.	"Neon Neighborhood"	Brooks, Tony Arata, Blazy, Bryan Kennedy, Rossi	4:03
6.	"The Ship and the Bottle" (featuring Kelly Clarkson)	Nicolle Galyon, Chase McGill, Jon Nite	4:04
7.	"Pleasure in the Pain"	Brooks, Rossi, Bobby Terry	4:22
8.	"The Ride"	John Blayne Detterline Jr., Gary Gentry	4:19
9.	"Another Man’s Sky"	Blazy, Royal Wade Kimes	3:39
10.	"We Belong to Each Other"	Stephanie Davis	4:02

== Personnel ==
- Garth Brooks – lead vocals, background vocals, prepared piano, production

Additional musicians

- Sam Bacco – drums, percussion, prepared piano
- Robert Bailey – background vocals on "We Belong to Each Other"
- Eddie Bayers – drums, percussion
- Bruce Bouton – steel guitar
- Jimmy Bowland – horns on "Neon Neighborhood"
- Dennis Burnside – horn arrangement on "Neon Neighborhood"
- Kelly Clarkson – vocals on "The Ship and the Bottle"
- Mark Douthit – horns on "Neon Neighborhood"
- Stuart Duncan – mandolin
- Ronnie Dunn – duet vocals on "Rodeo Man", co-producer of "Rodeo Man"
- Kevin Gatzke – horns on "Neon Neighborhood"
- Barry Green – horns on "Neon Neighborhood"
- Vicki Hampton – background vocals on "We Belong to Each Other"
- Chris Leuzinger – electric guitar
- Steve Mackey – bass guitar
- Blair Masters – keyboards
- "Neon Neighborhood" Choir
  - Tony Arata
  - Leslie Barr
  - Sam Beiber
  - Kent Blazy
  - Jenny Deathridge Bratt
  - Stacy Cappella
  - Don Cobb
  - Eric Conn
  - Dave Gant
  - Susan Gant
  - Trevor George
  - Max Goldberg
  - Charles Green
  - Mark Greenwood
  - Tracy Greenwood
  - Greg Jolly
  - Bryan Kennedy
  - Jessie Glee Kennedy
  - Tommy Lamberson
  - Chris Leuzinger
  - Elizabeth Leuzinger
  - Mary Leuzinger
  - Matt Lindsey
  - Ginger Mattingly
  - Jimmy Mattingly
  - Samantha Olson
  - Kathy Palmer
  - Mike Palmer
  - Brian Petree
  - Mitch Rossell
  - Kathy Rossi
  - Matt Rossi
  - Camille Tambunting
  - Bobby Terry
  - Cassandra Tormes
  - Layla Vartanian
- Steve Patrick – horns on "Neon Neighborhood"
- Milton Sledge – drums, percussion
- Bobby Terry – acoustic guitar
- Bergen White – background vocals, arrangement on "We Belong to Each Other"
- Bobby Wood – keyboards
- Trisha Yearwood – background vocals

Technical personnel

- Matthew "Buster" Allen – recording and mixing engineering
- Eric Conn – mastering engineering
- John Kelton – additional engineering
- Mark Miller – recording and mixing engineering
- Terry Palmer – assistant engineering
- Lucien Patten – assistant engineering
- Lowell Reynolds – recording engineering
- Bill Skibbe – mastering engineering
- James Viega – recording and mixing engineering

== Certifications ==
Region	Certification	Certified units/sales
United States (RIAA)	Platinum	1,000,000^{‡}
^{‡} Sales+streaming figures based on certification alone.

== See also ==
- 2023 in American music
- List of 2023 albums
