= The Garth Brooks Stadium Tour =

2018–22 concert tour by Garth Brooks

Stadium Tour
- North American tour by Garth Brooks
- Location: North America
- Start date: March 9, 2019
- End date: September 17, 2022
- Legs: 2
- No. of shows: 42

Garth Brooks concert chronology
- The Garth Brooks World Tour (2014–2017); Stadium Tour (2019–2022); Garth Brooks/Plus One (2023–2024)

The Garth Brooks Stadium Tour was a concert tour by American country music singer Garth Brooks. The tour began informally on October 20, 2018, at Notre Dame Stadium in Notre Dame, Indiana, and concluded on September 17, 2022, with a five night stand at Croke Park in Dublin, Ireland. Designed as Brooks' first all-stadium production, the tour visited North American college and professional football venues, alongside international stadium dates.

Conceived following the conclusion of his 2014–2017 World Tour, the production was staged entirely in-the-round on an open air central stage placed over field centers. The tour was notable for breaking all-time attendance and ticket-sales records at numerous venues across North America, including Ben Hill Griffin Stadium, U.S. Bank Stadium, GEHA Field at Arrowhead Stadium, and Empower Field at Mile High. To maintain low consumer entry points, Brooks implemented a flat rate ticket pricing model without dynamic markup across all primary market tiers.

Originally scheduled to run continuously through 2021, the tour experienced significant disruptions due to the COVID-19 pandemic, resulting in multiple date postponements and a complete suspension of performances from March 2020 to July 2021. Despite these delays, the tour ultimately encompassed 42 dates and drew over 3 million attendees before concluding in Europe.

== Background ==
After wrapping up his World Tour in 2017, Brooks announced a new tour in October 2018. The Stadium Tour, which began in spring 2019, visited North American stadiums, showcasing Brooks in a football-centric environment. Brooks "unofficially" kicked the tour off with a concert at Notre Dame Stadium on October 15, which was filmed as a two-hour television special for CBS. During this show, Brooks also mentioned his intent to close the tour by returning to Notre Dame.

== Special performances and broadcasts ==
During the first concert of the tour in St. Louis, Missouri on March 9, 2019, Brooks announced portions of the show would be recorded for a future documentary to air on A&E. The documentary, titled Garth Brooks: The Road I'm On, chronicles Brooks' career and aired in December 2019.

Also during the St. Louis concert, Brooks introduced his wife, Trisha Yearwood, to perform a selection of her songs. Yearwood, who performed with Brooks on his entire World Tour from 2014 to 2017, previously stated she would not perform on the Stadium Tour. However, due to inclement weather canceling her scheduled pre-show event outside the stadium, Yearwood joined Brooks for a special performance. Yearwood also joined Brooks for the show in Gainesville, Florida on April 20, 2019, to perform a tribute to Tom Petty.

On July 19, 2019, during the first of two shows in Boise, Idaho, Blake Shelton joined Brooks to perform their song, "Dive Bar". Footage from the concert was later released as a music video.

After its stop in Detroit in February 2020, the tour was halted indefinitely due to the COVID-19 pandemic. All remaining shows were rescheduled for 2021, with the tour resuming in Las Vegas on July 10, 2021. A planned show at Nissan Stadium in Nashville, Tennessee on July 31 was postponed due to inclement weather.

On August 18, 2021, all remaining stops on the tour were cancelled indefinitely due to SARS-CoV-2 Delta variant. All tickets were refunded, and Brooks stated that they planned to pursue rescheduling the dates in 2022.

During the July 30, 2022 show held at AT&T Stadium, Garth Brooks revealed this show was being recorded as the live album for the Stadium Tour.

== Critical reception ==
Reception for the tour was largely positive, with commentators praising Brooks' ability to translate his signature arena intimacy into massive venues. Reviewing the Denver performance, 303 Magazine commended Brooks' physical stamina and audience engagement, observing that his continuous movement across the 360-degree central stage made the venue's 84,000 attendees feel like active participants. Billboard's Melinda Newman highlighted the tour's scale and economic draw, pointing to broken attendance records across professional football venues nationwide. Some initial dates faced technical criticism regarding weather delays and audio dispersion inherent to unroofed stadium environments.

== Set list ==
This set list is representative of the performance of March 26, 2022 in Orlando, Florida. It does not represent all concerts for the duration of the series.

Main set
1. "Ain't Goin' Down ('Til the Sun Comes Up)"
2. "Rodeo"
3. "Two of a Kind, Workin' on a Full House"
4. "The Beaches of Cheyenne"
5. "Two Piña Coladas"
6. "The River"
7. "Fishin' in the Dark" (Nitty Gritty Dirt Band cover)
8. "The Thunder Rolls"
9. "Unanswered Prayers"
10. "If Tomorrow Never Comes"
11. "Much Too Young (To Feel This Damn Old)"
12. "Ask Me How I Know"
13. "That Summer"
14. "Callin' Baton Rouge"
15. "Shameless" (Billy Joel cover)
16. "Piano Man" (Billy Joel cover)
17. "You Never Even Called Me by My Name" (Steve Goodman cover)
18. "American Pie" (Don McLean cover)
19. "Papa Loved Mama"
20. "Friends in Low Places"
21. "The Dance"

"Housekeeping" fan-request set

22. "Every Now and Then"
23. "Amie" (Pure Prairie League cover)
24. "A Friend to Me"
25. "Make You Feel My Love" (Bob Dylan cover)
26. "All-American Kid"
27. "Last Night I Had the Strangest Dream" (Pete Seeger cover)
28. "How Sweet It Is (To Be Loved by You)" (Marvin Gaye cover)
29. "The Red Strokes"

Encore

30. "Shallow" (duet with Trisha Yearwood)
31. "Walkaway Joe" (Trisha Yearwood cover) (duet with Trisha Yearwood)
32. "Standing Outside the Fire"

== Tour dates ==
List of concerts, showing date, city, country, venue, opening acts, tickets sold, number of available tickets and amount of gross revenue
Date	City	Country	Venue	Opening act(s)	Attendance	Revenue
North America
March 9, 2019	St. Louis	United States	The Dome at America's Center	—N/a	75,000 / 75,000	$6,277,500
March 23, 2019	Glendale	United States	State Farm Stadium	Easton Corbin	77,653 / 77,653	$6,499,556
April 20, 2019	Gainesville	United States	Ben Hill Griffin Stadium	Chris Young	80,000 / 80,000	$6,696,000
May 3, 2019	Minneapolis	United States	U.S. Bank Stadium	King Calaway	140,000 / 140,000	$11,718,000
May 4, 2019	Minneapolis	United States	U.S. Bank Stadium	Darius Rucker	140,000 / 140,000	$11,718,000
May 18, 2019	Pittsburgh	United States	Heinz Field	Midland	75,000 / 75,000	$6,277,500
June 8, 2019	Denver	United States	Broncos Stadium at Mile High	Joe Nichols	83,915 / 83,915	$6,774,510
June 29, 2019	Eugene	United States	Autzen Stadium	Brooke Eden	60,000 / 60,000	$5,022,000
July 19, 2019	Boise	United States	Albertsons Stadium	Granger Smith	86,000 / 86,000	$7,198,200
July 20, 2019	Boise	United States	Albertsons Stadium	Dylan Scott	86,000 / 86,000	$7,198,200
August 9, 2019	Regina	Canada	Mosaic Stadium	Brett Kissel	79,000 / 79,000	$4,764,252
August 10, 2019	Regina	Canada	Mosaic Stadium	Jesse Labelle	79,000 / 79,000	$4,764,252
November 16, 2019	Knoxville	United States	Neyland Stadium	Jon Pardi	84,000 / 84,000	$7,030,800
February 22, 2020	Detroit	United States	Ford Field	Chase Rice	70,000 / 70,000	$6,193,800
July 10, 2021	Las Vegas	United States	Allegiant Stadium	—N/a	68,000 / 68,000	$5,440,500
July 17, 2021	Salt Lake City	United States	Rice–Eccles Stadium	—N/a	50,000 / 50,000	$4,185,000
August 7, 2021	Kansas City	United States	GEHA Field at Arrowhead Stadium	Martina McBride	74,500 / 74,500	$6,235,650
August 14, 2021	Lincoln	United States	Memorial Stadium	—N/a	91,000 / 91,000	$7,198,200
March 5, 2022	San Diego	United States	Petco Park	—N/a	50,000 / 50,000	$4,235,000
March 26, 2022	Orlando	United States	Camping World Stadium	—N/a	69,494 / 69,494	$5,886,142
April 15, 2022	Nashville	United States	Nissan Stadium	—N/a	149,052 / 149,052	$12,914,756
April 16, 2022	Nashville	United States	Nissan Stadium	Grand Ole Opry	149,052 / 149,052	$12,914,756
April 23, 2022	Fayetteville	United States	Donald W. Reynolds Razorback Stadium	Bobby Bones; Mitch Rossell	73,000 / 73,000	$6,183,100
April 30, 2022	Baton Rouge	United States	Tiger Stadium	Mitch Rossell	103,000 / 103,000	$8,724,100
May 7, 2022	Notre Dame	United States	Notre Dame Stadium	Mitch Rossell	70,000 / 70,000	$5,929,000
May 13, 2022	Cincinnati	United States	Paul Brown Stadium	Mitch Rossell	80,000 / 80,000	$6,776,000
May 14, 2022 (Note: The concert on May 14, 2022, at Paul Brown Stadium in Cincinnati was originally scheduled to take place on September 18, 2021, but was cancelled due to the coronavirus pandemic and later rescheduled for May 14, 2022.)	Cincinnati	United States	Paul Brown Stadium	Ghost Hounds	80,000 / 80,000	$6,776,000
May 20, 2022	Foxborough	United States	Gillette Stadium	Mitch Rossell	75,000 / 75,000	$6,352,500
May 21, 2022 (Note: The concert on May 21, 2022, at Gillette Stadium in Foxborough was originally scheduled to take place on October 9, 2021, but was cancelled due to the coronavirus pandemic and later rescheduled for May 21, 2022.)	Foxborough	United States	Gillette Stadium	Mitch Rossell	75,000 / 75,000	$6,352,500
June 4, 2022	Birmingham	United States	Protective Stadium	—N/a	50,000 / 50,000	$4,235,000
June 17, 2022	Salt Lake City	United States	Rice–Eccles Stadium	—N/a	110,000 / 110,000	$9,317,000
June 18, 2022	Salt Lake City	United States	Rice–Eccles Stadium	—N/a	110,000 / 110,000	$9,317,000
June 24, 2022	Edmonton	Canada	Commonwealth Stadium	Mitch Rossell	130,000 / 130,000	$9,387,811
June 25, 2022	Edmonton	Canada	Commonwealth Stadium	Mitch Rossell	130,000 / 130,000	$9,387,811
July 15, 2022	Charlotte	United States	Bank of America Stadium	—N/a	84,000 / 84,000	$7,114,800
July 16, 2022 (Note: The concert on July 16, 2022, at Bank of America Stadium in Charlotte was originally scheduled to take place in September 2021, but was cancelled due to the coronavirus pandemic and later rescheduled for July 16, 2022.)	Charlotte	United States	Bank of America Stadium	—N/a	84,000 / 84,000	$7,114,800
July 23, 2022	Orchard Park	United States	Highmark Stadium	—N/a	58,000 / 58,000	$4,912,600
July 30, 2022	Arlington	United States	AT&T Stadium	Matt Rossi; Trisha Yearwood	80,000 / 80,000	$6,776,000
August 6, 2022	Houston	United States	NRG Stadium	Mitch Rossell; Ghost Hounds	67,000 / 67,000	$5,674,900
Europe
September 9, 2022	Dublin	Ireland	Croke Park	—N/a	401,000 / 401,000	$28,621,080
September 10, 2022	Dublin	Ireland	Croke Park	—N/a	401,000 / 401,000	$28,621,080
September 11, 2022	Dublin	Ireland	Croke Park	—N/a	401,000 / 401,000	$28,621,080
September 16, 2022	Dublin	Ireland	Croke Park	—N/a	401,000 / 401,000	$28,621,080
September 17, 2022	Dublin	Ireland	Croke Park	—N/a	401,000 / 401,000	$28,621,080
Total					2,836,637 / 2,836,637	$230,551,257

== Cancelled shows ==
List of concerts, showing date, city, country, venue, and reason for cancellation
Date	City	Country	Venue	Reason
July 31, 2021	Nashville	United States	Nissan Stadium	Severe weather
September 4, 2021	Seattle	United States	Lumen Field	COVID-19 pandemic
October 2, 2021	Baltimore	United States	M&T Bank Stadium	COVID-19 pandemic

== Personnel ==
Below is the personnel from the concert in St. Louis, Missouri. It may not reflect the personnel from each concert on the tour.

- Robert Bailey – backing vocals
- Garth Brooks – vocals, acoustic guitar, electric guitar
- Ty England – acoustic guitar, backing vocals
- David Gant – keyboards
- Mark Greenwood – bass guitar, backing vocals
- Vicki Hampton – backing vocals
- Gordon Kennedy – electric guitar
- Chris Leuzinger – electric guitar
- Blair Masters – keyboards, accordion
- Jimmy Mattingly – fiddle, acoustic guitar
- Steve McClure – pedal steel guitar, electric guitar
- Mike Palmer – drums, percussion
- Bobby Terry – acoustic guitar, backing vocals
