= Dive Bar Tour =

Dive Bar Tour can refer to

- Dive Bar Tour (Lady Gaga), Lady Gaga's 2016 tour
- Dive Bar Tour (Garth Brooks), Garth Brooks' 2019–2021 tour
- G-Eazy's 2017 tour with that name
- Post Malone's 2018–2019 tour with that name
