= Garth Brooks/Plus One =

Concert residency by Garth Brooks

- Residency by Garth Brooks
- Location: Las Vegas, Nevada, U.S.
- Venue: The Colosseum at Caesars Palace
- Start date: May 18, 2023
- End date: July 13, 2024
- No. of shows: 72
- Box office: $137.7 million

Garth Brooks concert chronology
- The Garth Brooks Stadium Tour (2019–2022); Garth Brooks/Plus One (2023–2024); The Blame It All On My Roots Tour (2026)

Garth Brooks/Plus One was a concert residency by American country music singer Garth Brooks at The Colosseum at Caesars Palace in Las Vegas. It began on May 18, 2023, and concluded on July 13, 2024, with 72 total shows. Brooks presented the performances both in an intimate, one-man show format, and also with his band present on select songs throughout the set. The project marked his second Las Vegas residency following Garth at Wynn (2009–2014), and immediately followed the conclusion of The Garth Brooks Stadium Tour (2019–2022).

Unlike Brooks' traditional concert tours, "Plus One" did not have a defined set list, relying on acoustic requests, covers of Brooks' influential artists, guest appearances, and rotating full band arrangements. The residency was a commercial success, selling out all initial dates on the first day of pre-sale. This prompted multiple extensions, concluding with 99% of available tickets sold and ranking among the highest-grossing concert series at a single venue.

== Background ==
Following the conclusion of The Garth Brooks Stadium Tour in 2022, Brooks announced his second concert residency, "Garth Brooks/Plus One", during an appearance on Good Morning America on November 14, 2022. Held at The Colosseum at Caesars Palace in Las Vegas, the venture marked his return to a residency format following his Garth at Wynn run from 2009 to 2014. The title, Plus One, references the intimate structure of the shows, though members of his backing band were integrated into each performance. Brooks emphasized the performance freedom of the residency, allowing him to change production from an acoustic set to a full-band set, with no defined script.

== Stage design and production ==
The residency's stage layout emphasized a minimalist, theatrical aesthetic, featuring a stripped down platform designed to reduce distance between the performer and audience. The visual presentation relied on warm, focused spotlights and dynamic backlight rigs, designed to transition smoothly between acoustic moments and sets involving Brooks' full band. Upon entry, audience members were required to secure their mobile devices in locked Yondr pouches, which remained in their possession, inaccessible until exiting the venue. As compensation for the restriction, attendees were provided a QR code granting access to a gallery of professionally shot photographs from the performance.

== Commercial performance ==
Ticketing was managed through Ticketmaster's Verified Fan platform due to high demand. After all initial 2023 dates sold out on the first day of presale, an extension of the residency into 2024 was announced the following week, granting priority access to registered pre-sale applicants. The sustained demand prompted subsequent extensions. Throughout its multi-year engagement, Plus One consistently operated near maximum capacity, selling over 99% of available tickets across the 72-show run. The residency has been highlighted as one of the primary drivers of box office revenue at The Colosseum at Caesars Palace during the 2020s. It ranks among the highest-grossing concert series at a single venue, grossing $137.7 million.

== Critical reception ==
Feedback on the residency was positive, with reviewers praising its balance of acoustic intimacy and full band energy. The Las Vegas Review-Journal's John Katsilometes highlighted the unscripted nature of the shows, noting that Brooks transformed the venue into a "sing-along of a lifetime" by blending solo stories, surprise guest appearances, and spontaneous audience interaction. Critics also commended the structural contrast between the stripped down storytelling segments and the high octane backing instrumentation provided by Brooks' band. Additionally, duets with his wife, Trisha Yearwood, were cited as performance highlights.

== Show structure ==
Unlike Brooks' previous concert tours, performances during the "Plus One" residency lacked a fixed set list, operating on an unscripted format that featured varying acoustic solos, guest duets, and rotating covers.

While the exact sequence changed nightly, performances consistently to a four part structure:

1. Solo Acoustic Segment: Brooks on acoustic guitar, performing stripped-down covers of influential artists (such as Bob Seger and Keith Whitley), before transitioning into his early singles.
2. Full Band Segment: The introduction of Brooks' touring band for hits, including "Rodeo", "Two Piña Coladas", and "Callin' Baton Rouge".
3. Duet Segment: A guest appearance by Trisha Yearwood, featuring signature duets ("In Another's Eyes", "Whiskey to Wine", "Shallow"), and a performance of Yearwood's signature singles.
4. Housekeeping and Finale: Brooks' acoustic request segment, "Housekeeping", then closing with "The Dance" and "Friends in Low Places".

The format allowed Brooks to incorporate unreleased material while also rotating covers honoring artists, such as George Strait, Eric Clapton, and Billy Joel. Selective performances also featured unannounced guest appearances from musicians and songwriters, showing improvisation and audience interaction.

== Residency dates ==
Date	City	Country	Venue
May 18, 2023	Las Vegas	United States	The Colosseum at Caesars Palace
May 20, 2023	Las Vegas	United States	The Colosseum at Caesars Palace
May 21, 2023	Las Vegas	United States	The Colosseum at Caesars Palace
May 25, 2023	Las Vegas	United States	The Colosseum at Caesars Palace
May 27, 2023	Las Vegas	United States	The Colosseum at Caesars Palace
May 28, 2023	Las Vegas	United States	The Colosseum at Caesars Palace
June 1, 2023	Las Vegas	United States	The Colosseum at Caesars Palace
June 3, 2023	Las Vegas	United States	The Colosseum at Caesars Palace
June 4, 2023	Las Vegas	United States	The Colosseum at Caesars Palace
July 6, 2023	Las Vegas	United States	The Colosseum at Caesars Palace
July 8, 2023	Las Vegas	United States	The Colosseum at Caesars Palace
July 9, 2023	Las Vegas	United States	The Colosseum at Caesars Palace
July 13, 2023	Las Vegas	United States	The Colosseum at Caesars Palace
July 15, 2023	Las Vegas	United States	The Colosseum at Caesars Palace
July 16, 2023	Las Vegas	United States	The Colosseum at Caesars Palace
July 20, 2023	Las Vegas	United States	The Colosseum at Caesars Palace
July 22, 2023	Las Vegas	United States	The Colosseum at Caesars Palace
July 23, 2023	Las Vegas	United States	The Colosseum at Caesars Palace
November 29, 2023	Las Vegas	United States	The Colosseum at Caesars Palace
December 1, 2023	Las Vegas	United States	The Colosseum at Caesars Palace
December 2, 2023	Las Vegas	United States	The Colosseum at Caesars Palace
December 6, 2023	Las Vegas	United States	The Colosseum at Caesars Palace
December 8, 2023	Las Vegas	United States	The Colosseum at Caesars Palace
December 9, 2023	Las Vegas	United States	The Colosseum at Caesars Palace
December 13, 2023	Las Vegas	United States	The Colosseum at Caesars Palace
December 15, 2023	Las Vegas	United States	The Colosseum at Caesars Palace
December 16, 2023	Las Vegas	United States	The Colosseum at Caesars Palace
Leg 2
April 18, 2024	Las Vegas	United States	The Colosseum at Caesars Palace
April 20, 2024	Las Vegas	United States	The Colosseum at Caesars Palace
April 21, 2024	Las Vegas	United States	The Colosseum at Caesars Palace
April 25, 2024	Las Vegas	United States	The Colosseum at Caesars Palace
April 27, 2024	Las Vegas	United States	The Colosseum at Caesars Palace
April 28, 2024	Las Vegas	United States	The Colosseum at Caesars Palace
May 2, 2024	Las Vegas	United States	The Colosseum at Caesars Palace
May 4, 2024	Las Vegas	United States	The Colosseum at Caesars Palace
May 5, 2024	Las Vegas	United States	The Colosseum at Caesars Palace
June 26, 2024	Las Vegas	United States	The Colosseum at Caesars Palace
June 28, 2024	Las Vegas	United States	The Colosseum at Caesars Palace
June 29, 2024	Las Vegas	United States	The Colosseum at Caesars Palace
July 3, 2024	Las Vegas	United States	The Colosseum at Caesars Palace
July 5, 2024	Las Vegas	United States	The Colosseum at Caesars Palace
July 6, 2024	Las Vegas	United States	The Colosseum at Caesars Palace
July 10, 2024	Las Vegas	United States	The Colosseum at Caesars Palace
July 12, 2024	Las Vegas	United States	The Colosseum at Caesars Palace
July 13, 2024	Las Vegas	United States	The Colosseum at Caesars Palace

== Personnel ==
Personnel adapted may not reflect the personnel from each concert in the residency.

Primary performer

- Garth Brooks – vocals, acoustic guitar

Guest performers

- Trisha Yearwood – vocals, acoustic guitar

Musicians

- Robert Bailey – backing vocals
- David Gant – keyboards, musical director
- Mark Greenwood – bass guitar, backing vocals
- Vicki Hampton – backing vocals
- Jimmy Mattingly – fiddle, acoustic guitar
- Steve McClure – pedal steel guitar, electric guitar
- Mike Palmer – drums, percussion

Production

- Live Nation Entertainment – promoter
- Caesars Entertainment – venue partner

== See also ==
- List of Garth Brooks concert tours
- List of highest-grossing concert series at a single venue
