= Baby, Let's Lay Down and Dance =

Single by Garth Brooks

from the album Gunslinger
- Released: October 13, 2016
- Studio: Allentown Studios (Nashville, Tennessee)
- Genre: Country
- Length: 3:10
- Label: Pearl
- Songwriter(s): Kent Blazy; Steve Dorff; Victoria Shaw; Kim Williams; Garth Brooks
- Producer(s): Mark Miller

Garth Brooks singles chronology
"Mom" (2014)	"Baby, Let's Lay Down and Dance" (2016)	"Ask Me How I Know" (2017)

"Baby, Let's Lay Down and Dance" is a song recorded by American country music singer Garth Brooks. It was released as the first single off Brooks' 2016 album, Gunslinger. The single was distributed exclusively via Brooks' online music store, GhostTunes, to users who entered a code from a specially marked bag of Fritos. It was then released to radio and GhostTunes' conventional site.

The song was written by Kent Blazy, Steve Dorff, Victoria Shaw, Kim Williams and Brooks. Williams died before the song was finished, and as Williams was a longtime collaborator with Brooks, it was important to Brooks to release this song as the album's first single.

== Charts ==
=== Weekly charts ===
Chart (2016–2017)	Peak position
US Country Airplay (Billboard)	15
US Hot Country Songs (Billboard)	29

=== Year-end charts ===
Chart (2017)	Position
US Hot Country Songs (Billboard)	94
