= Christmas Together (Garth Brooks and Trisha Yearwood album) =

Studio album by Garth Brooks and Trisha Yearwood
- Released: November 11, 2016
- Recorded: July–October 2016
- Studios: Allentown Studios (Nashville, Tennessee)
- Genres: Christmas; country
- Length: 27:56
- Labels: Pearl; Gwendolyn
- Producer: Mark Miller

Garth Brooks chronology
| The Ultimate Collection (2016) | Christmas Together (2016) | Gunslinger (2016) |

Trisha Yearwood chronology
| PrizeFighter: Hit After Hit (2014) | Christmas Together (2016) | Let's Be Frank (2018) |

Christmas Together is the first Christmas duets studio album by American country music artists Garth Brooks and Trisha Yearwood, released by Pearl Records on November 11, 2016.

== Background ==
Although Trisha Yearwood had recorded with her husband Garth Brooks before and sang backing vocals on many of his songs, this album is their first joint album. It is a mix of familiar favorites and some new songs, however only some of these songs are duets. It was released on November 11, 2016, the same day that Brooks' 10-disc box set, The Ultimate Collection, was released via Target. A Walmart exclusive that bundled Christmas Together with Brooks' new album Gunslinger was released a week later.

== Reception ==
The album debuted at No. 1 on the Top Country Albums and No. 2 on the Top Holiday Albums chart, with 21,000 copies sold in its first week. It has sold 194,800 copies in the United States as of November 2017.

The Walmart exclusive bundled with Gunslinger debuted at No. 14 with 6,600 copies sold, and reached No. 3 on that chart the following week, selling 23,000 copies that week. The bundle has sold 81,700 copies as of January 2017.

== Track listing ==
| No. | Title | Writer(s) | Length |
|---|---|---|---|
| 1. | "I'm Beginning to See the Light" | Duke Ellington, Don George, Johnny Hodges, Harry James | 1:42 |
| 2. | "Ugly Christmas Sweater" | Garth Brooks, John Martin | 1:55 |
| 3. | "Santa Baby" | Joan Javits, Philip Springer, Tony Springer | 2:41 |
| 4. | "Feliz Navidad" | José Feliciano | 2:18 |
| 5. | "What Are You Doing New Year's Eve?" | Frank Loesser | 3:29 |
| 6. | "Marshmallow World" | Peter DeRose, Carl Sigman | 2:18 |
| 7. | "Merry Christmas Means I Love You" | Brooks, Jenny Yates | 3:26 |
| 8. | "Hard Candy Christmas" | Carol Hall | 2:59 |
| 9. | "Baby, It's Cold Outside" | Loesser | 2:19 |
| 10. | "The Man with the Bag" | Dudley Brooks, Hal Stanley, Irving Taylor | 1:54 |
| 11. | "What I'm Thankful for (The Thanksgiving Song)" (with James Taylor) | Brooks, Trisha Yearwood | 2:55 |
| Total length: | | | 27:56 |

== Personnel ==
Adapted from liner notes.

- Garth Brooks – lead vocals, backing vocals
- Trisha Yearwood – lead vocals, backing vocals
- Bobby Wood – keyboards
- Billy Panda – acoustic guitars
- James Taylor – acoustic guitar (11), lead and backing vocals (11)
- Chris Leuzinger – electric guitars
- Bruce Bouton – steel guitar
- Stuart Duncan – mandolin
- Mike Chapman – bass
- Michael Rhodes – bass
- Sam Bacco – drums, percussion
- Milton Sledge – drums, percussion
- Rob Hajacos – fiddle
- Dennis Burnside – string, horn and woodwind arrangements
- Carl Gorodetzky – contractor
- Tania Hancheroff – backing vocals (2–6)
- Jon Mark Ivey – backing vocals (2–6)
- Shane McConnell – backing vocals (2–6)
- Lisa Silver – backing vocals (2–6)
- Kira Small – backing vocals (2–6)
- Bergen White – backing vocals (2–6), BGV arrangements (2–6)
- Kim Taylor – backing vocals (11)

The Nashville String Machine

- David Angell, Monisa Angell, Bruce Christensen, Janet Darnell, David Davidson, Beverly Drukker, Connie Ellisor, Jim Grosjean, Anthony LaMarchina, Stefan Petrescu, Carole Rabinowitz, Julie Tanner, Alan Umstead, Cathy Umstead, Mary Katherine Vanosdale, Katelyn Westergard, Bruce Wethey, Kris Wilkinson and Karen Winklemann – strings
- Roy Agee, Jeff Bailey, Preston Bailey, Barry Green, Mike Haynes, Prentiss Hobbs, Chris McDonald and Steve Patrick – horns
- Jimmy Bowland, Sam Levine, Kelsey Mire, Doug Moffet, Robbie Shankle – woodwinds

Ugly Christmas Sweater Choir

- Roy Agee, Jeff Bailey, Preston Bailey, Garth Brooks, Barry Green, Mike Haynes, Prentiss Hobbs, Sam Horowitz, Slide Jackson, John Martin, Chris McDonald, Kelsey Mire, Doug Moffet and Steve Patrick

== Production ==
- Mark Miller – producer
- Matthew Allen – recording, mixing
- John Kelton – additional engineer
- Don Cobb – mastering
- Eric Conn – mastering
- Independent Mastering (Nashville, Tennessee) – mastering location
- Luellyn Latocki Hensley – art direction
- Jeff Crump – design
- Sally Carns Gulde – design
- Jeremy Cowart – photography
- Russ Harrington – photography

== Charts ==
=== Weekly charts ===
| Chart (2016–17) | Peak position |
|---|---|
| Australian Albums (ARIA) | 110 |
| Canadian Albums (Billboard) | 7 |
| Irish Albums (IRMA) | 45 |
| US Billboard 200 | 7 |
| US Top Country Albums (Billboard) | 1 |

=== Year-end charts ===
| Chart (2017) | Position |
|---|---|
| US Billboard 200 | 185 |
| US Top Country Albums (Billboard) | 31 |

| Chart (2018) | Position |
|---|---|
| US Top Country Albums (Billboard) | 82 |

| Chart (2019) | Position |
|---|---|
| US Top Country Albums (Billboard) | 92 |

== Certifications ==
Certifications for Christmas Together
| Region | Certification | Certified units/sales |
|---|---|---|
| Canada (Music Canada) | Gold | 40,000^{‡} |
^{‡} Sales+streaming figures based on certification alone.
