= Ask Me How I Know =

Single by Garth Brooks

from the album Gunslinger
- Released: March 17, 2017
- Studio: Allentown Studios (Nashville, Tennessee)
- Genre: Country, country rock
- Length: 3:34
- Label: Pearl
- Songwriter: Mitch Rossell
- Producer: Mark Miller

Garth Brooks singles chronology
"Baby, Let's Lay Down and Dance" (2016)	"Ask Me How I Know" (2017)	"All Day Long" (2018)

"Ask Me How I Know" is a 2017 song written by Mitch Rossell, and recorded by American country music singer Garth Brooks. It is the second single off Brooks's 2016 album, Gunslinger. The single's release coincided with the announcement of Brooks performing at South by Southwest, as well as the Houston Livestock Show and Rodeo. It became his first new number one song since "More Than a Memory" in 2007.

== Charts ==
=== Weekly charts ===
Chart (2017)	Peak position
Canada Country (Billboard)	30
US Billboard Hot 100	71
US Country Airplay (Billboard)	1
US Hot Country Songs (Billboard)	13

=== Year-end charts ===
Chart (2017)	Position
US Country Airplay (Billboard)	40
US Hot Country Songs (Billboard)	54
