= Stronger Than Me (Garth Brooks song) =

2018 song by Garth Brooks

Single by Garth Brooks

from the album Fun
- Released: November 19, 2018
- Genre: Country
- Length: 3:30
- Label: Pearl
- Songwriters: Matt Rossi; Bobby Terry
- Producer: Garth Brooks

Garth Brooks singles chronology
"All Day Long" (2018)	"Stronger Than Me" (2018)	"Dive Bar" (2019)

"Stronger Than Me" is a song recorded by American country music singer Garth Brooks. It was released on November 19, 2018, as second single from Brooks' fourteenth studio album Fun. The song was written by Bobby Terry and Matt Rossi. His wife Trisha Yearwood also participated chorus.

== Background ==
Brooks debuted the song during the 2018 CMA Awards, and mentioned the song tributed to wife Trisha Yearwood. The song is a love song dedicated to his wife.

== Content ==
Brooks said at Popculture: "There are points in your life you never get across," "You both just get to this point, where you argue and argue and then you just get exhausted, and you're done, and that's kind of our way. We have two or three points in our life like that." "That song addresses two of those three points, so I noticed when I looked up at her, at those points, she was kind of laughing, smiling, and crying at the same time," "so this song's going to actually make our relationship better, whether it does anything in the business or not."

== Charts ==
=== Weekly charts ===
Chart (2018–2019)	Peak position
US Country Airplay (Billboard)	42
US Hot Country Songs (Billboard)	38

=== Year-end charts ===
Chart (2019)	Position
US Hot Country Songs (Billboard)	100
