= America's National Parks (TV series) =

- Narrated by: Garth Brooks
- Country of origin: United States
- Original language: English
- No. of seasons: 2
- No. of episodes: 10

Production
- Executive producers: Garth Brooks; Anwar Mamon; Dan Rees; Drew Jones
- Producers: Myles Connolly; Ben Wallis
- Production company: Wildstar Films

Original release
- Network: National Geographic; Disney+
- Release: August 29, 2022

America's National Parks is an American television nature documentary series released on National Geographic and Disney+.

== Development and release ==
Wildstar Films produced the series for National Geographic. Wildstar's Anwar Mamom and Dan Rees are executive producers on the series, as is National Geographic's Drew Jones. Myles Connolly and Ben Wallis are the series' producers. American country singer Garth Brooks narrated the series and also served as an executive producer.

Released on Nat Geo's flagship television channel, the first season premiered on August 29, 2022. Its five episodes premiered on the channel over five consecutive nights. The five national parks highlighted were Grand Canyon, Yosemite, Big Bend, Badlands, and Hawaiʻi Volcanoes. On August 31, the series was released on Disney+. The series was released during National Geographic's annual "America's National Parks Week" event. First Lady Jill Biden also appeared as a special guest on the series, introducing each episode as they premiered on National Geographic. As part of these introductions, she issued special messages on the connection each of the parks hold to the American people.

The series was renewed for a second season, which premiered on Nat Geo's TV channel on June 5, 2023. On June 7, the second season was released on Disney+. Brooks returned as narrator for the second season.
