= Fun (Garth Brooks album) =

Studio album by Garth Brooks
- Released: November 20, 2020
- Studios: Allentown Studios (Nashville, Tennessee)
- Genre: Country
- Length: 49:30
- Label: Pearl
- Producer: Garth Brooks

Garth Brooks chronology
Triple Live (2018)	Fun (2020)	Time Traveler (2023)

Singles from Fun
- 1. "All Day Long" Released: June 19, 2018; 2. "Stronger Than Me" Released: November 19, 2018; 3. "Dive Bar" Released: June 18, 2019; 4. "Shallow" Released: December 1, 2020; 5. "That's What Cowboys Do" Released: June 29, 2021

Professional ratings
Review scores
Source	Rating
AllMusic	4/5 stars

Fun is the eleventh studio album by American country music artist Garth Brooks. Announced in 2018, the album experienced production delays and its release was postponed due to the COVID-19 pandemic, eventually culminating in a release date of November 20, 2020. The lead single, "All Day Long", was released on June 19, 2018, followed by a second single, "Stronger Than Me", on November 19, 2018. The third single, "Dive Bar", a duet featuring Blake Shelton, was released on June 18, 2019. The fourth single, "Shallow", a duet featuring Trisha Yearwood, was released on December 1, 2020. The fifth single, "That's What Cowboys Do" was released on June 29, 2021. A selection of seven tracks were available for streaming via Amazon Music prior to the album's release.

== Track listing ==
Fun track listing
No.	Title	Writer(s)	Length
1.	"The Road I’m On"	Randall King, Garth Brooks	3:26
2.	"That's What Cowboys Do"	John Martin, Mitch Rossell, Brooks	3:33
3.	"All Day Long"	Bryan Kennedy, Rossell, Brooks	3:07
4.	"Shallow" (with Trisha Yearwood)	Lady Gaga, Mark Ronson, Anthony Rossomando, Andrew Wyatt	3:41
5.	"Dive Bar" (with Blake Shelton)	Rossell, Kennedy, Brooks	2:36
6.	"Amen"	Bobby Terry, Matt Rossi, Brooks	3:29
7.	"The Courage of Love"	Martin, Brooks	4:08
8.	"I Can Be Me With You"	Benita Hill, Amanda Colleen Williams	3:00
9.	"Message in a Bottle"	Jenny Yates, Brooks	4:49
10.	"Stronger Than Me"	Rossi, Terry	3:30
11.	"(A Hard Way to Make An) Easy Livin’"	Rossi, Terry	3:44
12.	"Where the Cross Don’t Burn" (featuring Charley Pride)	Troy Jones, Phil Thomas	4:02
13.	"–"	–	0:04
14.	"Party Gras (The Mardi Gras Song)"	Rossi, Brooks	2:58
15.	"(Sometimes You’ve Got to Die To) Live Again"	Gabe Dixon, Wayne Kirkpatrick	3:15
Total length:			49:30

== Personnel ==
Adapted from liner notes.

- Roy Agee – horns
- David Angell – strings
- Monisa Angell – strings
- Sam Bacco – percussion
- Jeff Bailey – horns
- Robert Bailey – backing vocals
- Carrie Bailey – strings
- Kevin Bate – strings
- Eddie Bayers – drums
- Jenny Bifano – strings
- Bruce Bouton – pedal steel and lap steel guitars
- Garth Brooks – vocals, acoustic guitar, producer
- Dennis Burnside – horn and string arrangements
- David Campbell – horn and string arrangements
- Bruce Christensen – strings
- Janet Darnell – strings
- David Davidson – strings
- Eleonore Denig – strings
- Gabe Dixon – keyboards, piano
- Mark Douthit – horns
- Jason Eskridge – backing vocals
- Connie Ellisor – strings
- Kim Fleming – backing vocals
- Quentin Flowers – strings
- Barry Green – horns
- Rob Hajacos – fiddle
- Vicki Hampton – backing vocals
- Michael Haynes – horns
- Anthony LaMarchina – strings
- Betsy Lamb – strings
- Chris Leuzinger – acoustic and electric guitars
- Sam Levine – horns
- Zoya Leybin – strings
- Steve Mackey – bass guitar
- Blair Masters – keyboards and piano
- Jimmy Mattingly – fiddle
- Joey Miskulin – accordion
- Doug Moffet – horns
- Wendy Moten – backing vocals
- Billy Panda – acoustic guitar
- Steve Patrick – horns
- Charley Pride – duet vocals on "Where the Cross Don't Burn"
- Carole Rabinowitz-Neune – strings
- Blake Shelton – duet vocals on "Dive Bar"
- Milton Sledge – drums, percussion
- Caitlyn Smith – backing vocals
- Bobby Terry – acoustic guitar
- Alan Umstead – strings
- Cathy Umstead – strings
- Mary Katherine Vanosdale – strings
- Kris Wilkinson – strings
- Karen Winklemann – strings
- Bobby Wood – keyboards and piano
- Glenn Worf – bass guitar
- Trisha Yearwood – background vocals, duet vocals on "Shallow"

== Charts ==
=== Weekly charts ===
Weekly chart performance of Fun
Chart (2020)	Peak position
US Billboard 200	42
US Top Country Albums (Billboard)	7

=== Year-end charts ===
Year-end chart performance for Fun
Chart (2021)	Position
US Top Country Albums (Billboard)	66

== Certifications ==
Certifications for Fun
Region	Certification	Certified units/sales
United States (RIAA)	2× Platinum	2,000,000^{‡}
^{‡} Sales+streaming figures based on certification alone.
