= Gunslinger (album) =

Studio album by Garth Brooks
- Released: November 25, 2016
- Studio: Allentown Studios (Nashville, Tennessee)
- Genre: Country
- Length: 35:04
- Label: Pearl
- Producer: Mark Miller

Garth Brooks chronology
Christmas Together (2016)	Gunslinger (2016)	Triple Live (2018)

Singles from Gunslinger
- 1. "Baby, Let's Lay Down and Dance" Released: October 13, 2016; 2. "Ask Me How I Know" Released: March 17, 2017

Gunslinger is the tenth studio album by American country music artist Garth Brooks, released on November 25, 2016 by Pearl Records. The album's lead single, "Baby, Let's Lay Down and Dance", was released on October 13, 2016.

== Reception ==
Professional ratings
Aggregate scores
Source	Rating
Metacritic	65/100
Review scores
Source	Rating
AllMusic	4/5 stars
The Independent	3/5 stars
Rolling Stone	2.5/5 stars

The album has been given a Metacritic score of 65 based on 5 critics, indicating generally favorable reviews.

The album debuted at No. 4 on the Top Country Albums chart, selling 19,000 copies in its first week as a standalone album. The album has sold 146,700 copies in the US as of March 2018.

A Walmart exclusive that bundled Christmas Together with Gunslinger was released the week before the album itself was released, and debuted at No. 14 on the Top 10 Country Albums chart with 6,600 copies sold. This bundle reached No. 3 on that chart, selling 23,000 copies in the second week.

== Track listing ==
Standard version
No.	Title	Writer(s)	Length
1.	"Honky-Tonk Somewhere"	Garth Brooks; Kent Blazy; Bryan Kennedy; Kim Williams	2:25
2.	"Weekend"	Brooks; Benita Hill	2:40
3.	"Ask Me How I Know"	Mitch Rossell	3:34
4.	"Baby, Let's Lay Down and Dance"	Brooks; Blazy; Williams; Steve Dorff; Victoria Shaw	3:10
5.	"He Really Loves You"	Brooks; Bobby Wood	4:00
6.	"Pure Adrenaline"	Brooks; Gordon Kennedy	3:49
7.	"Whiskey to Wine" (featuring Trisha Yearwood)	Brooks; B. Kennedy; Wynn Varble	4:13
8.	"BANG! BANG!"	Brooks; B. Kennedy; David Ashmore	3:10
9.	"Cowboys and Friends"	Brooks; Matt Rossi	3:14
10.	"8teen"	Brooks; Jenny Yates	4:49
Total length:			35:04

The Ultimate Collection version
No.	Title	Writer(s)	Length
1.	"Honky-Tonk Somewhere"	Brooks; Blazy; Bryan Kennedy; Williams	2:25
2.	"Weekend"	Brooks; Hill	2:40
3.	"Ask Me How I Know"	Rossell	3:34
4.	"Baby, Let's Lay Down and Dance"	Brooks; Blazy; Williams; Dorff; Shaw	3:10
5.	"He Really Loves You"	Brooks; Wood	4:00
6.	"Whiskey to Wine" (featuring Trisha Yearwood)	Brooks; B. Kennedy; Varble	4:13
7.	"BANG! BANG!"	Brooks; B. Kennedy; Ashmor	3:10
8.	"Pure Adrenaline"	Brooks; Gordon Kennedy	3:49
9.	"8teen"	Brooks; Yates	4:49
10.	"SugarCane"	Brooks; Blazy; Williams	3:15
11.	"Cowboys and Friends"	Brooks; Rossi	3:14
12.	"Friends in Low Places" (featuring George Strait, Jason Aldean, Keith Urban and Florida Georgia Line)	Dewayne Blackwell; Earl Bud Lee	4:20
Total length:			42:39

== Personnel ==
Adapted from AllMusic:

Vocals

- Garth Brooks – vocals
- Karyn Rochelle – backing vocals
- Trisha Yearwood – backing vocals

Musicians

- Roy Agee – horns
- Sam Bacco – drums, percussion
- Jeff Bailey – horns
- Preston Bailey – horns
- Eddie Bayers – drums and percussion
- Bruce Bouton – steel guitar
- Jimmy Bowland – horns
- Dennis Burnside – horn arrangements and conductor
- David Campbell – string arrangements
- Mike Chapman – bass guitar
- Mark Douthit – horns
- Barry Green – horns
- Kenny Greenberg – acoustic and electric guitars
- Rob Hajacos – fiddle
- Mike Haynes – horns
- Prentiss Hobbs – horns
- Chris Leuzinger – electric guitar
- Chris McDonald – horns
- Blair Masters – keyboards
- Jimmy Mattingly – fiddle
- Doug Moffett – horns
- Brian Frasier-Moore – drums and percussion
- Billy Panda – acoustic guitar
- Steve Patrick – horns
- Danny Rader – bouzouki, mandolin
- Mitch Rossell – acoustic guitar on "Ask Me How I Know"
- Robbie Shankle – horns
- Milton Sledge – drums and percussion
- Eric Smith – bass guitar
- Denis Solee – horns
- Bobby Wood – keyboards
- Bob Wray – bass guitar
- Nashville String Machine – strings

Technical personnel

- Matthew "Buster" Allen – engineer
- Don Cobb – mastering
- Eric Conn – mastering
- John Kelton – engineer
- Mark Miller – mixing, producer

== Charts ==
=== Weekly charts ===
Chart (2016–17)	Peak position
Australian Albums (ARIA)	16
Canadian Albums (Billboard)	18
Irish Albums (IRMA)	9
New Zealand Heatseekers Albums (RMNZ)	9
Scottish Albums (OCC)	47
Swiss Albums (Schweizer Hitparade)	93
UK Albums (OCC)	81
US Billboard 200	25
US Top Country Albums (Billboard)	4

=== Year-end charts ===
Chart (2017)	Position
US Top Country Albums (Billboard)	57

=== Singles ===
Year	Single	Peak chart positions			
Year	Single	US Country	US Country Airplay	US	CAN Country
2016	"Baby, Let's Lay Down and Dance"	29	15	—	23
2017	"Ask Me How I Know"	13	1	71	30

== Certifications ==
Region	Certification	Certified units/sales
United States (RIAA)	2× Platinum	2,000,000^{‡}
^{‡} Sales+streaming figures based on certification alone.
