= All Day Long (Garth Brooks song) =

Single by Garth Brooks

from the album Fun
- B-side: "The Road I'm On"
- Released: June 19, 2018
- Genre: Country
- Length: 3:05
- Label: Pearl
- Songwriter(s): Bryan Kennedy; Garth Brooks; Mitch Rossell
- Producer(s): Garth Brooks

Garth Brooks singles chronology
"Ask Me How I Know" (2017)	"All Day Long" (2018)	"Stronger Than Me" (2018)

"All Day Long" is a song co-written and recorded by American country music singer Garth Brooks. It was released as the first single off Brooks' fourteenth studio album Fun. The song was written by Brooks, Bryan Kennedy and Mitch Rossell.

== Charts ==
=== Weekly charts ===
Chart (2018)	Peak position
Canada Country (Billboard)	22
US Bubbling Under Hot 100 Singles (Billboard)	9
US Hot Country Songs (Billboard)	21
US Country Airplay (Billboard)	11

=== Year-end charts ===
Chart (2018)	Position
US Country Airplay (Billboard)	46
US Hot Country Songs (Billboard)	68
