= Dive Bar (Garth Brooks and Blake Shelton song) =

2019 song by Garth Brooks and Blake Shelton

Single by Garth Brooks and Blake Shelton

from the album Fun
- Released: June 18, 2019
- Genre: Country
- Length: 2:37
- Label: Pearl
- Songwriters: Garth Brooks, Bryan Kennedy, Mitch Rossell
- Producer: Garth Brooks

Garth Brooks singles chronology
"Stronger Than Me" (2018)	"Dive Bar" (2019)	"Shallow" (2020)

Blake Shelton singles chronology
"God's Country" (2019)	"Dive Bar" (2019)	"Hell Right" (2019)

"Dive Bar" is a song recorded by American country music singers Garth Brooks and Blake Shelton. It was released to country radio on June 18, 2019 as the third single on Brooks' fourteenth studio album Fun. The song was written by Brooks, Bryan Kennedy and Mitch Rossell.

== Release and promotion ==
On June 18, 2019, "Dive Bar" was released only to country radio stations. The digital single was made available for streaming only on July 15, 2019, exclusively through Amazon Music. On July 7, Brooks announced a promotional concert tour in support of the single. The Dive Bar Tour features Brooks visiting seven dive bars throughout the United States.

On July 15, 2019, Brooks performance of the song during the Dive Bar Tour aired on Jimmy Kimmel Live!.

== Charts ==
=== Weekly charts ===
Weekly chart performance for "Dive Bar"
Chart (2019–2020)	Peak position
Canada Country (Billboard)	42
US Billboard Hot 100	78
US Country Airplay (Billboard)	6
US Hot Country Songs (Billboard)	17

=== Year-end charts ===
2019 year-end chart performance for "Dive Bar"
Chart (2019)	Position
US Country Airplay (Billboard)	57
US Hot Country Songs (Billboard)	71

2020 year-end chart performance for "Dive Bar"
Chart (2020)	Position
US Country Airplay (Billboard)	51
US Hot Country Songs (Billboard)	63
