= Garth Brooks =

American country singer (born 1962)

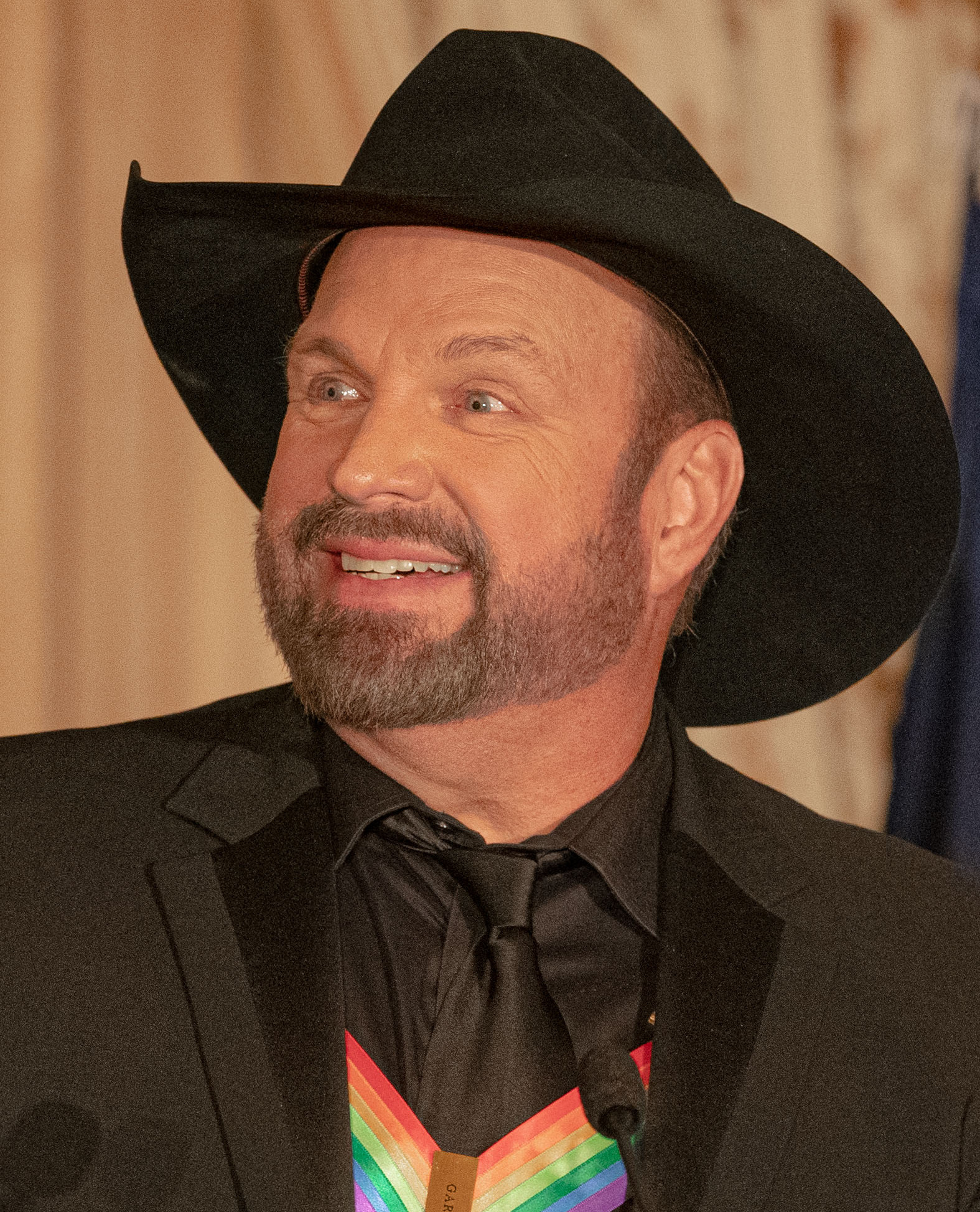
- Brooks at the Kennedy Center Honors in 2022
- Born: Troyal Garth Brooks; February 7, 1962 (age 64); Tulsa, Oklahoma, U.S.
- Other name: Chris Gaines
- Education: Oklahoma State University
- Occupations: Singer; songwriter
- Spouses: Sandy Mahl (m. 1986; div. 2001); Trisha Yearwood (m. 2005)
- Children: 3
- Musical career
- Genres: Country; country pop; country rock
- Instruments: Vocals; guitar; piano
- Works: Garth Brooks discography
- Years active: 1985–2001; 2005–present
- Labels: Capitol Nashville; Liberty; Pearl; Lyric Street; Big Machine; RCA Nashville
- Website: garthbrooks.com

Troyal Garth Brooks (born February 7, 1962) is an American country singer and songwriter. His musical style blends traditional country with pop and rock elements, which has earned him his immense popularity, particularly in the United States, with success on the country music single and album charts, multi-platinum recordings and record-breaking live performances, while also crossing over into the mainstream pop arena.

Brooks is the only artist in music history to have released nine albums that were certified Diamond by the Recording Industry Association of America (surpassing The Beatles' former record of six); those albums are Garth Brooks (diamond), No Fences (17× platinum), Ropin' the Wind (14× platinum), The Chase (diamond), In Pieces (diamond), The Hits (diamond), Sevens (diamond), Double Live (21× platinum), and The Ultimate Hits (diamond). Since 1989, Brooks has released 37 records in all, which include 14 studio albums, 2 live albums, 5 compilation albums, 3 Christmas albums and 13 box sets, along with 63 singles. He has won several awards in his career, including 2 Grammy Awards, 17 American Music Awards (including "Artist of the '90s") and the RIAA Award for best-selling solo albums artist of the century in the U.S.

Troubled by conflicts between career and family, Brooks retired from recording and performing from 2001 until 2005. During this time, he sold millions of albums through an exclusive distribution deal with Walmart and sporadically released new singles. In 2005, Brooks started a partial comeback, giving select performances and releasing two compilation albums. In 2009, he began Garth at Wynn, a periodic weekend concert residency at Las Vegas's Encore Theatre from December 2009 to January 2014. Following the conclusion of the residency, Brooks announced his signing with Sony Music Nashville in July 2014. In September 2014, he began his comeback world tour, with wife and musician Trisha Yearwood, which culminated in 2017. This was followed by his Stadium Tour, which began in 2019, and another Las Vegas concert residency, Garth Brooks/Plus ONE, concluding in 2024. His most recent album, Time Traveler, was released in November 2023. His current tour, The Blame It All On My Roots Tour, began in August 2026.

Brooks is one of the world's best-selling music artists, having sold more than 170 million records. Billboard ranked Brooks as the greatest male solo artist on the Billboard 200 chart of all time. As of 2020, according to the RIAA, he is the best-selling solo albums artist in the United States with 162 million domestic units sold, ahead of Elvis Presley, and is second only to the Beatles in total album sales overall. Brooks was inducted into the Country Music Hall of Fame on October 21, 2012, having been inducted into the Songwriters Hall of Fame the year before. He was also inducted into the Musicians Hall of Fame and Museum in 2016 with his studio musicians, The G-Men. In 2020, Brooks became the youngest recipient of the Library of Congress Gershwin Prize for Popular Song.

== Early life and education ==
Troyal Garth Brooks was born on February 7, 1962, in Tulsa, Oklahoma. He was the youngest child of Troyal Raymond Brooks Jr. (1931–2010), a draftsman for an oil company, and Colleen McElroy Carroll (1929–1999), a 1950s-era country singer of Irish ancestry who recorded on the Capitol Records label and appeared on Ozark Jubilee. This was the second marriage for each of his parents, giving Brooks four older half-siblings (Jim, Jerry, Mike, and Betsy). The couple had two children together, Kelly and Garth. At their home in Yukon, Oklahoma, the family hosted weekly talent nights. All of the children were required to participate, either by singing or doing skits. Brooks learned to play both the guitar and banjo.

As a child, Brooks often sang in casual family settings, but his primary focus was athletics. In high school, he played football and baseball and ran track and field. He received a track scholarship to Oklahoma State University in Stillwater, where he competed in the javelin. At nights, he worked as a bouncer at a local bar and formed his own band, Santa Fe, learning to play whatever the college audience wanted. Brooks graduated in 1984 with a degree in advertising. His roommate, Ty England, later played guitar in his road band until going solo in 1995.

== Career ==
=== 1985–1989: Musical beginnings ===
In 1985, Brooks began his professional music career, singing and playing guitar in Oklahoma clubs and bars, most notably Wild Willie's Saloon in Stillwater. Through his elder siblings, Brooks was exposed to a wide range of music. Although he listened to some country music, especially that of George Jones, Brooks was most fond of rock music, citing James Taylor, Dan Fogelberg, and Townes Van Zandt as major influences. In 1981, after hearing "Unwound", the debut single of George Strait, Brooks decided that he was more interested in playing country music.

In 1985, entertainment attorney Rod Phelps drove from Dallas to listen to Brooks. Phelps liked what he heard and offered to produce Brooks' first demo. With Phelps' encouragement, including a list of Phelps' contacts in Nashville and some of his credit cards, Brooks traveled to Nashville to pursue a recording contract; he returned to Oklahoma within 24 hours. Phelps continued to urge Brooks to return to Nashville, which he did. In 1987, Brooks and wife Sandy Mahl moved to Nashville, and Brooks began making contacts in the music industry.

=== 1989–1990: Breakthrough success ===
Garth Brooks' eponymous first album was released in 1989 and was a chart success. It peaked at No. 2 on the Billboard Top Country Albums chart, and reached No. 13 on the Billboard 200 chart. Most of the album was traditionalist country, influenced in part by George Strait. The first single, "Much Too Young (To Feel This Damn Old)", was a country top 10 success. It was followed by Brooks' first number-one single on the Hot Country Songs chart, "If Tomorrow Never Comes". "Not Counting You" reached No. 2, and "The Dance" reached No. 1; its music video, directed by John Lloyd Miller, gave Brooks his first push towards a broader audience. Brooks has later claimed that out of all the songs he has recorded, "The Dance" remains his favorite. In 1989, Brooks embarked on his first major concert tour, as opening act for Kenny Rogers.

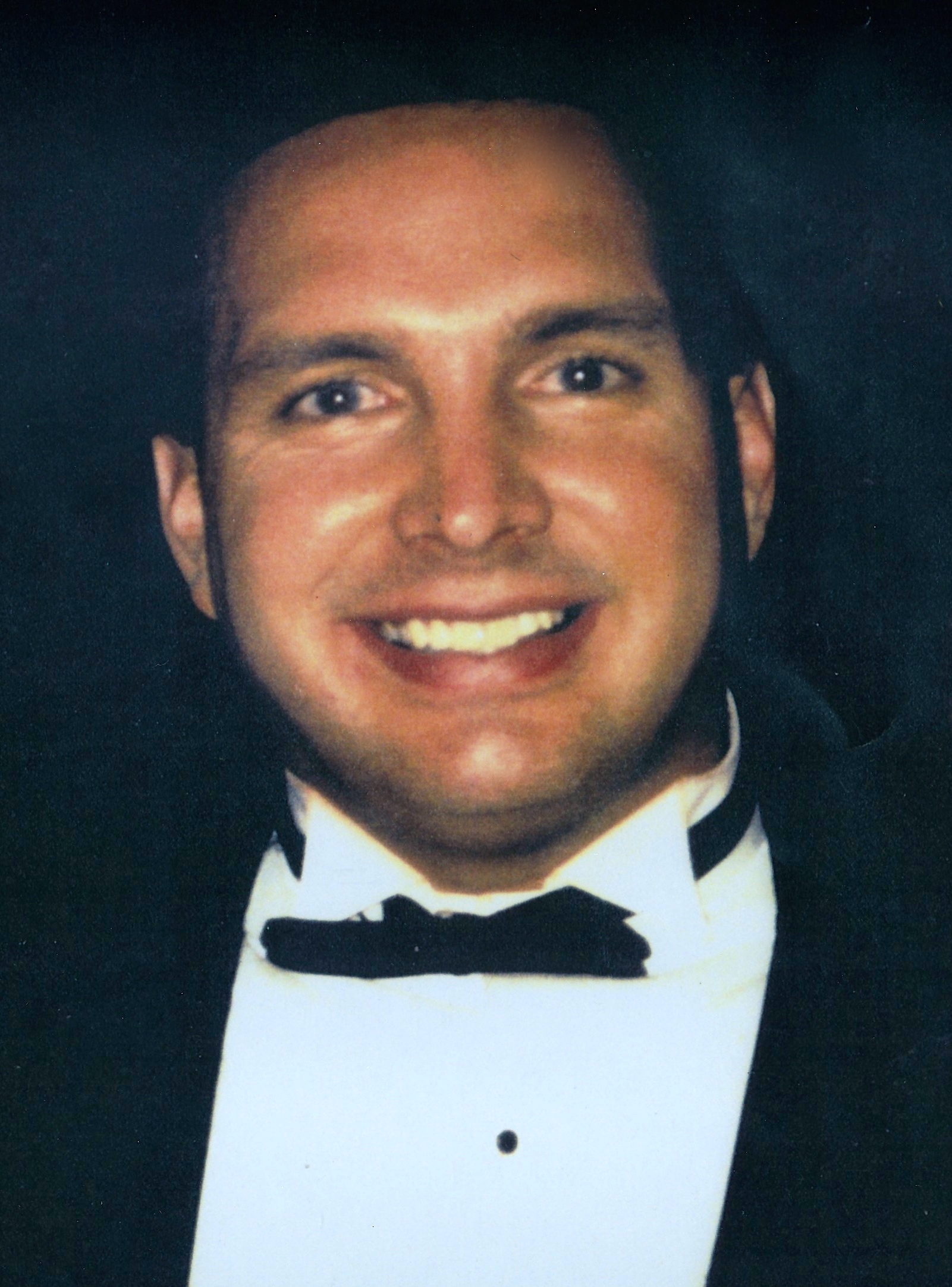
Garth Brooks at the Country Music Awards 1991 after receiving awards for his first #1 album, No Fences.

Brooks' second album, No Fences, was released in 1990 and spent 23 weeks at No. 1 on the Billboard Top Country Albums chart. The album also reached No. 3 on the Billboard 200, and eventually became Brooks' highest-selling album, with domestic shipments of 18 million. It contained what would become Brooks' signature song, "Friends in Low Places", as well as other popular singles, "The Thunder Rolls" and "Unanswered Prayers".

Each of these songs, as well as "Two of a Kind, Workin' on a Full House", reached No. 1 on the Hot Country Songs chart. While Brooks' musical style placed him squarely within the boundaries of country music, he was strongly influenced by the 1970s singer-songwriter movement, especially the works of James Taylor, whom he idolized and named his first child after, as well as Dan Fogelberg. Similarly, Brooks was influenced by the 1970s-era rock of Billy Joel and Bruce Springsteen and the operatic rock of Queen with Freddie Mercury.

In his live shows, Brooks used a wireless headset microphone to free himself to run about the stage, adding energy and arena rock theatrics to spice up the normally staid country music approach to concerts. The band Kiss was also one of Brooks' early musical influences, and his shows often reflect this. Despite all the cited influences, Brooks stated the energetic style of his stage persona is directly inspired by Chris LeDoux.

In late 1990, Brooks was inducted into the Grand Ole Opry.

=== 1991–1993: Ropin' the Wind, The Chase, and Beyond the Season ===
Brooks' third album, Ropin' the Wind, was released in September 1991. It had advance orders of 4 million copies and entered the Billboard 200 at No. 1, a first for a country artist. The album's musical content was a melange of country pop and honky-tonk; singles included "The River", "What She's Doing Now", and a cover of Billy Joel's "Shameless". It would become Brooks' second-best selling album, after No Fences. The success of Ropin' the Wind further propelled the sales of Brooks' first two albums, enabling Brooks to become the first country artist with three albums listed in the Billboard 200's top 20 in one week. NBC filmed Brooks' Reunion Arena concerts in Dallas on September 20 and 21, 1991, and premiered it as a television special two months later.

After spending time in Los Angeles during the 1992 riots, Brooks co-wrote a gospel-country-rock hybrid single, "We Shall Be Free", to express his desire for tolerance. The song became the first single off his fourth album The Chase. The single only reached No. 12 on the Billboard Top Country Singles chart, Brooks' first song in three years to fail to make the top 10. Nonetheless, "We Shall Be Free" peaked at No. 22 on the Billboard Christian Songs charts through a marketing deal with Rick Hendrix Company, and earned Brooks a 1993 GLAAD Media Award. The next single released from The Chase was "Somewhere Other Than the Night", followed by "Learning to Live Again", which peaked at numbers one and two on the Hot Country Songs chart, respectively. The album's final single, "That Summer", would go on to be the most successful single from the album, reaching No. 1 in July 1993.

Brooks released his first Christmas album, Beyond the Season on August 25, 1992. The album included classics such as "White Christmas" and "Silent Night", as well as an original tune, "The Old Man's Back in Town". "Beyond the Season" was the best-selling Christmas album in 1992, peaking at No. 2 on the Billboard 200 chart.

=== 1993–1994: In Pieces and first world tour ===
In 1993, Brooks, who had criticized music stores selling used CDs since it led to a loss in proper royalty payments, persuaded Capitol Records to not ship his 1993 album, In Pieces, to stores which engaged in this practice. This led to several antitrust lawsuits against the record label, ending with Capitol shipping the albums to the stores.

Despite the delay in shipping, In Pieces was another success, peaking at No. 1 on both the Billboard 200 and Top Country Albums charts, and selling a total of nearly 10 million copies. After a delay in its worldwide release, the album also peaked at No. 2 on the United Kingdom Albums Chart. That same year, "The Red Strokes" became Brooks' first single to make the UK Singles Chart, reaching a high of No. 13; it was followed by "Standing Outside the Fire", which reached No. 23. Previous albums No Fences, Ropin' the Wind and The Chase also remained in the top 30 in the UK Albums Chart.

Brooks' first world tour began in 1993, reaching the UK after many domestic concerts; that September, NBC filmed Brooks' three concerts in Dallas at Texas Stadium for another television special, which was broadcast in May 1994. Brooks sold-out venues such as Birmingham's National Exhibition Centre and London's Wembley Arena, a feat never accomplished by an American country music artist. He also began the London radio station, Country 1035. Despite the disdain of the British media, Brooks' overall popularity in the country was evident, with a top disc jockey, Nick Barraclough, referring to Brooks as Garth Vader (a play on Darth Vader) for his "invasion" of the charts and his success in the country genre. Unlike Alan Jackson, who refused to return to the UK after being treated in a similar negative manner by the press, Brooks would later return in 1996 for more performances. Brooks also took his World Tour to other regions throughout Europe, as well as Brazil, Australia, and New Zealand.

In 1994, Brooks paid homage to one of his musical influences, Kiss, appearing on the tribute compilation, Kiss My Ass: Classic Kiss Regrooved, a collection of songs performed by popular artists from various genres. The unlikely collaboration of Brooks and Kiss' rendition of "Hard Luck Woman" was performed live on The Tonight Show with Jay Leno, and despite its hard-rock appeal, Brooks' version appeared on the Billboard Hot Country Songs chart.

=== 1995–1998: More albums released and second world tour ===
In November 1995, Brooks released Fresh Horses, his first album of new material in two years. Within six months of its release, the album had sold over three million copies. Despite its promising start, Fresh Horses plateaued quickly, topping out at eight-times platinum. The album's lead single, "She's Every Woman" peaked at No. 1 on the Billboard Hot Country Songs chart; however, its follow-up single, "The Fever" (an Aerosmith cover) only peaked at No. 23, becoming Brooks' first country single to not chart on the top 10. However, Brooks had three additional top 10 singles from the album, including "The Beaches of Cheyenne", which reached No. 1.

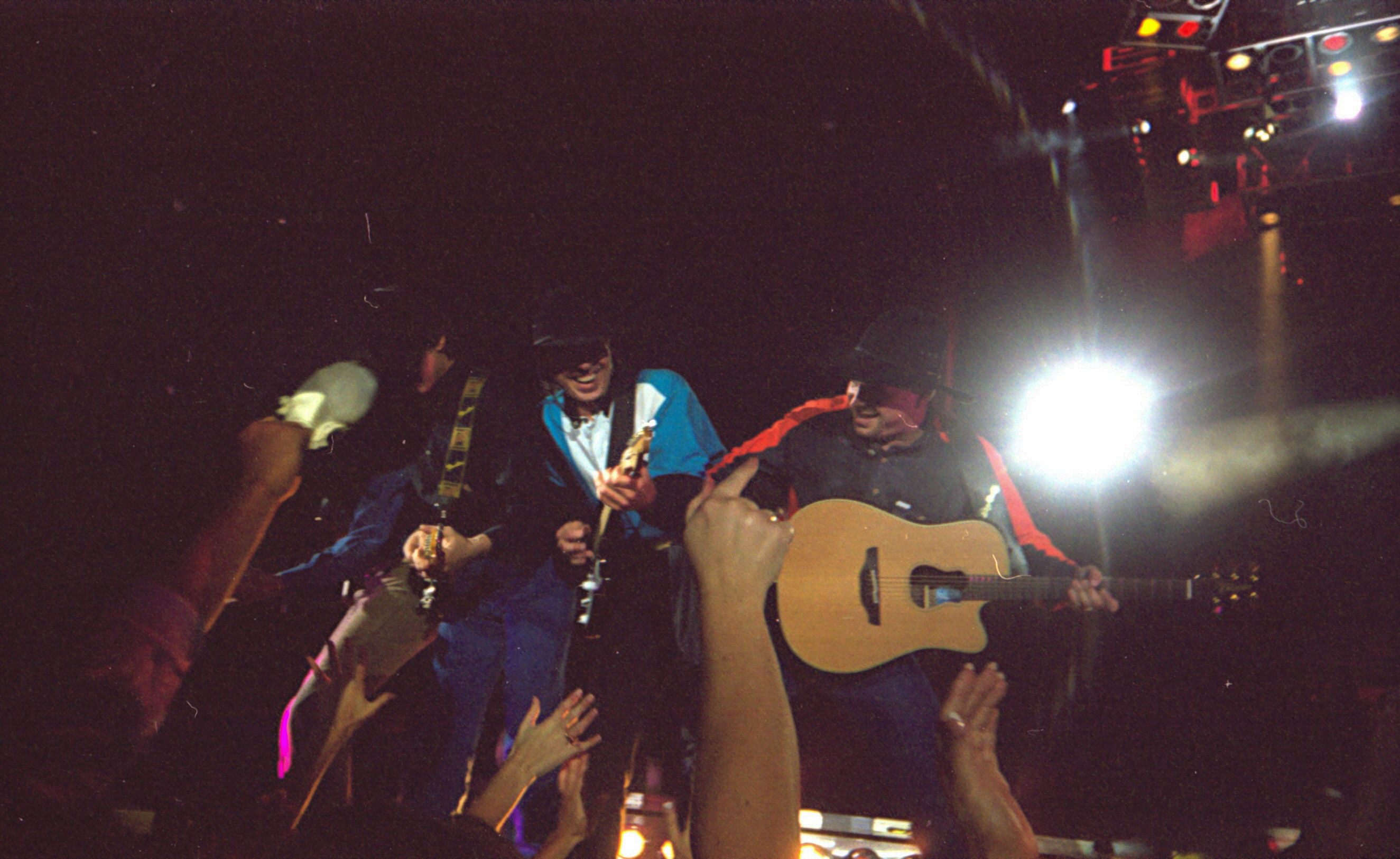
Brooks on The Garth Brooks World Tour in 1998

Following the release of Fresh Horses, Brooks embarked on his second world tour. Its total attendance, approximately 5.5 million, ranks third on the all-time list of concert attendance, and its gross of over $105 million ranks it among the highest-grossing concert tours in the 1990s.

In 1997, Brooks released his seventh studio album, Sevens. The album was originally scheduled to be released in August 1997, allowing for promotion during Brooks' Central Park concert on HBO; however, plans went awry after a dispute within Capitol Records. The Central Park concert went on as planned, receiving 980,000 fans in attendance and becoming the largest concert in park history.

Sevens debuted at No. 1 on both the Billboard 200 and Top Country Albums charts. It later became Brooks' fourth album to reach sales of 10 million copies. The album included the duet "In Another's Eyes" with Trisha Yearwood, which reached No. 2 on Hot Country Songs chart, and its first single, "Longneck Bottle", with Steve Wariner, reached No. 1. The album spawned two additional number-one singles, "Two Pina Coladas" and "To Make You Feel My Love" (a Bob Dylan cover), which also was a top 10 hit on the Hot Adult Contemporary Tracks chart and was released on the soundtrack to the film, Hope Floats.

Brooks' first live album, Double Live was released in 1998. Recorded at various shows over the course of his second world tour, the album contained new material not previously released, such as "Tearin' It Up (and Burnin' It Down)" and "Wild as the Wind," featuring Trisha Yearwood. Peaking at No. 1 on both the Billboard 200 and Top Country Albums charts, Double Live went on to become the best-selling live album of all time, certified 25× Platinum by the RIAA, and is the seventh-most shipped album in United States music history.

In 1998, Brooks also released the first installment of The Limited Series, a six-disc box set containing reissues of his first six studio albums. Each of the reissued albums included a bonus track not available on the original release.

=== 1999: "Chris Gaines" and holiday album ===
In 1999, Brooks took on the persona of "Chris Gaines", a fictitious rock-and-roll musician and character for an upcoming film titled The Lamb. In September 1999, the film's pre-release soundtrack, Garth Brooks in... the Life of Chris Gaines (also dubbed Gaines' Greatest Hits), was released to much public criticism. Brooks also appeared as Gaines in a television mockumentary for the VH1 series Behind the Music, and as the musical guest on an episode of Saturday Night Live, which he also hosted as himself.

Brooks' promotion of the album and the film did not garner excitement, and the failure of the Gaines project was evident mere weeks after the album was released. The majority of the American public was either bewildered, or completely unreceptive to the idea of Brooks portraying a rock-and-roll musician. Sales of the album were unspectacular, at least compared with most of Brooks' previous albums, and although it made it to No. 2 on the Billboard 200 chart, expectations had been higher and retail stores began heavily discounting their oversupply. Less-than-expected sales of the album (more than two million) brought the project to an indefinite hiatus in February 2001 and Gaines quickly faded into obscurity.

Despite the less-than-spectacular response to the Gaines project, Brooks gained his first (and only) Billboard Top 40 pop single in "Lost in You". The album was later certified Double Platinum by the RIAA.

On November 23, 1999, Brooks released his second holiday album, Garth Brooks & the Magic of Christmas. The album peaked at No. 7 on Billboard's Top 200 and No. 1 on the Top Country Albums, making it Brooks' 10th number-one album.

=== 2000–2004: Scarecrow and retirement ===
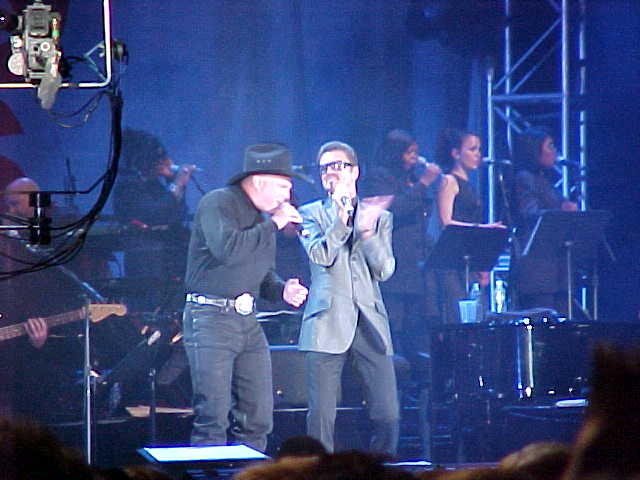
Brooks and George Michael at the Robert F. Kennedy Memorial Stadium, Washington, 29 April 2000

As his career flourished, Brooks seemed frustrated by the conflicts between career and family. He first talked of retiring from performing in 1992, and again in 1995, but each time returned to touring. In 1999, Brooks appeared on The Nashville Network's Crook & Chase program, again mentioning retirement in a more serious tone. On October 26, 2000, Brooks officially announced his retirement from recording and performing. Later that evening, Capitol Records noted Brooks' achievement of selling 100 million albums in the US, celebrating at Nashville's Gaylord Entertainment Center.

Brooks' final album before retirement, Scarecrow, was released on November 13, 2001. The album did not match the sales levels of Brooks' heyday, but still sold well, reaching No. 1 on Billboard 200 and Top Country Albums charts. Although he staged a few performances for promotional purposes, Brooks stated that he would be retired from recording and performing at least until his youngest daughter finished high school.

=== 2005–2008: Compilation albums and special performances ===
In 2005, Brooks expressed his interest in returning to live performances; however, he remained adamant to the premise of not releasing new music until 2014. Despite this, later that year, Brooks signed a deal with Walmart, leasing them the rights to his entire catalog following his split with Capitol Records. Brooks was one of the first musicians to sign an exclusive music distribution deal with a single retailer (along with fellow country music artist Ricky Van Shelton, who issued his 1998 album Making Plans through the chain as well).

Three months later, in November 2005, Brooks and Walmart issued an updated The Limited Series compilation, a box set containing reissues of Brooks' albums, including Double Live, and The Lost Sessions, featuring eleven previously unreleased recordings. The box set sold more than 500,000 physical copies on its issue date. By the first week in December 2005, it had sold over 1 million physical copies.

Brooks took a brief break from retirement early in 2005 to perform in various benefit concerts. He also released a new single, "Good Ride Cowboy", as a tribute to his late friend and country singer, Chris LeDoux, via Walmart.

In early 2006, Walmart reissued The Lost Sessions as a single CD apart from the box set, with additional songs, including a duet with Trisha Yearwood, "Love Will Always Win", which reached the top 25 on the Billboard Hot Country Songs chart. The couple were later nominated for a "Best Country Collaboration With Vocals" Grammy Award.

On August 18, 2007, Brooks announced plans for a new box set, The Ultimate Hits. The new set featured two discs containing 30 classic songs, three new songs, and a DVD featuring music videos. The album's first single, "More Than a Memory", was released on August 27, 2007. It debuted at No. 1 on the Billboard Hot Country Songs chart, becoming the highest-debuting single in the chart's history.

In November 2007, Brooks embarked on Garth Brooks: Live in Kansas City, performing nine sold-out concerts in Kansas City at the Sprint Center, which had opened a month prior. Originally scheduled to be only one show, the performance expanded to nine due to incredibly high demand, with all nine shows (equaling about 140,000 tickets) selling out in under two hours. The final concert of the series was simulcast to more than 300 movie theaters across the U.S.

In January 2008, Brooks embarked on another incredible feat performing five sold-out shows (in less than 48 hours) at the Staples Center in Los Angeles for a fundraiser towards the 2007 wildfires season that impacted much of Southern California's cities and counties. The first concert (of the five) titled Garth Brooks: Live in LA was taped and broadcast repeatedly on CBS with all donations going to all of the victims and families in state of California who were impacted by the fires.

=== 2009–2013: Las Vegas concert residency ===
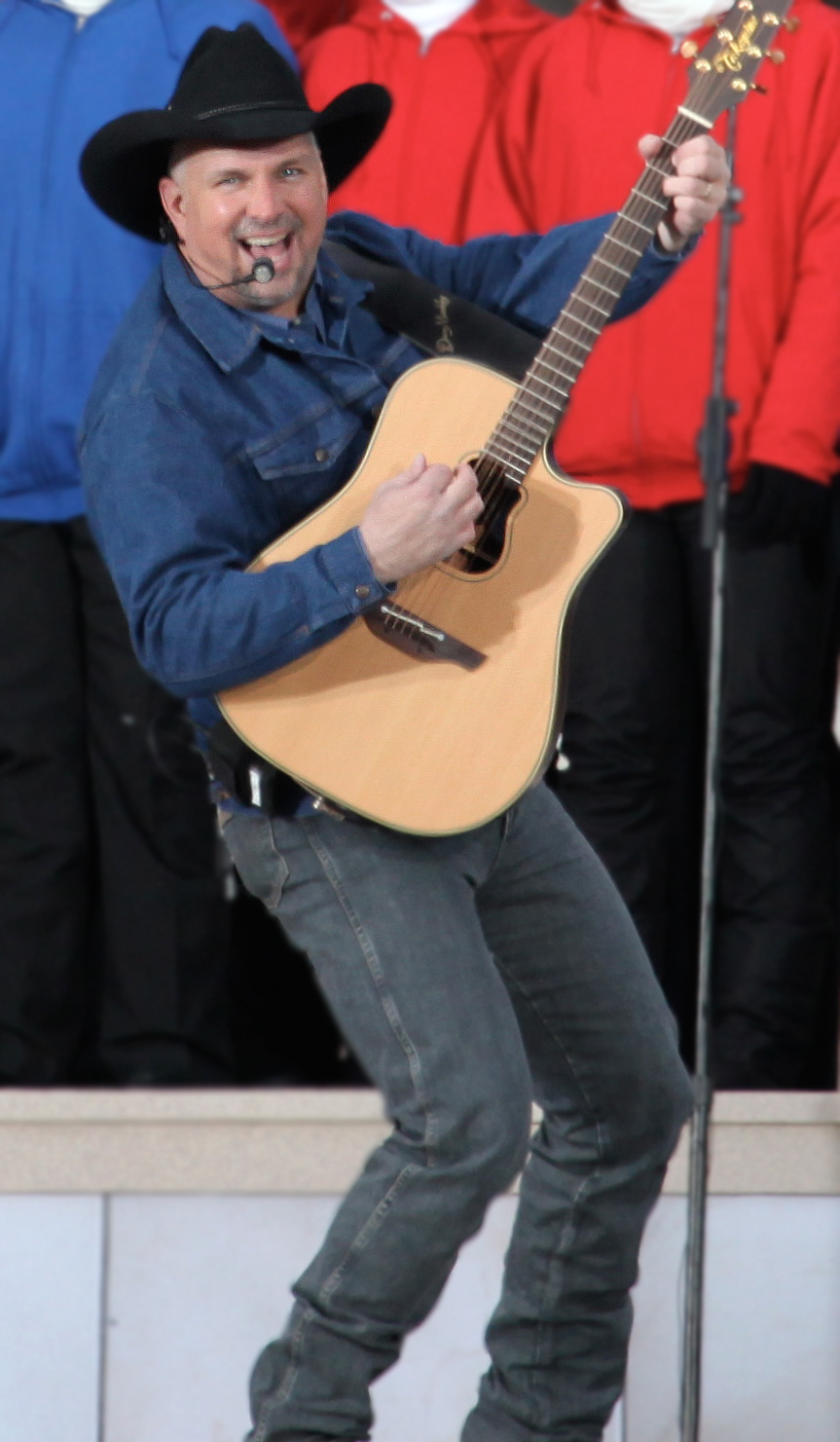
Brooks at the We Are One concert in 2009

In January 2009, Brooks made another one of few public appearances since his retirement, performing at the We Are One: The Obama Inaugural Celebration at the Lincoln Memorial concert in Washington, D.C.. In his three-song set, Brooks performed "We Shall Be Free", along with covers of Don McLean's "American Pie" and the Isley Brothers' "Shout".

On October 15, 2009, Brooks suspended his retirement to begin Garth at Wynn, a periodic weekend concert residency at Encore Las Vegas on the Las Vegas Strip. The schedule allowed Brooks both to have the family life during the week and to continue to perform on the weekend. The financial terms of the agreement were not announced, but Steve Wynn did disclose that he gave Brooks access to a private jet to quickly transport him between Las Vegas and his home in Oklahoma.

Brooks' first weekend on shows in Vegas received positive reviews and was called the "antithesis of Vegas glitz and of the country singer's arena and stadium extravaganzas" by USA Today. The shows featured Brooks performing solo, acoustic concerts, and included a set list of songs that have influenced him. Artists covered in the show include Simon & Garfunkel, Bob Seger, Billy Joel and Don McLean. His first performances at Encore Las Vegas coincided with his wedding anniversary, and his wife Trisha Yearwood joined him for two songs.

In 2013, influenced by the set list of the Las Vegas shows, Brooks released Blame It All on My Roots: Five Decades of Influences via Walmart, a compilation album consisting of songs Brooks attributes to the development of his unique country pop genre. The box set's albums were individually certified Platinum and the compilation received a Billboard Music Award nomination. In a December 2013 appearance on Good Morning America to promote the album, Brooks also surprisingly announced plans for a world tour, beginning in 2014.

=== 2014–2015: Man Against Machine, GhostTunes, and world tour ===
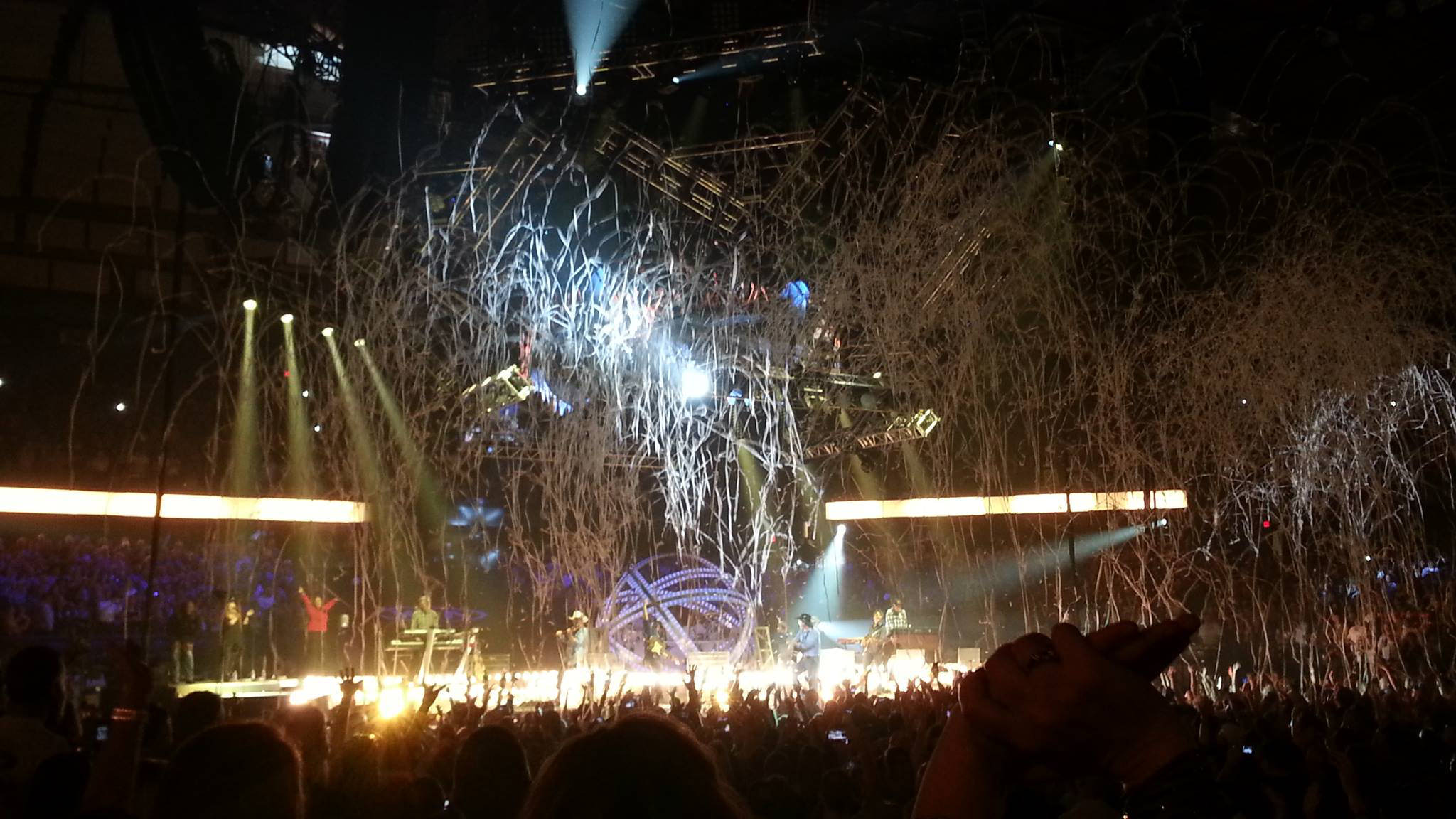
Brooks' tour with Trisha Yearwood in 2014

In February 2014, Brooks announced two concerts at Croke Park, Dublin, Ireland, to be held on July 25 and 26, 2014. Due to high demand, three additional shows were added, and a total of 400,000 tickets were sold. However, due to licensing conflict, Aiken Promotions and Croke Park management were prompted to cancel two of the five concerts after conflict among nearby residents. Brooks, committed to performing the five original concerts, refused to follow through with the request to only perform three, and all concerts were cancelled.

On July 10, 2014, Brooks held a press conference where he announced his signing with Sony Music Nashville, as well as confirming plans for a new album, world tour, the release of his music in a digital format, and remorse for the Ireland concert controversy. Fifteen days later, tickets first went on sale for the world tour.

On September 3, 2014, Brooks released his comeback single, "People Loving People", in promotion of his world tour and new album, Man Against Machine. The song debuted onto the Nielsen BDS-driven Country Airplay chart at No. 19, tying for the third-highest debut of Brooks' career. On September 4, 2014, Brooks released his entire studio output on digital for the first time ever. Bypassing traditional digital music service providers, Brooks opted into releasing his albums directly his own new digital music store, GhostTunes. On September 19, Brooks confirmed the release date for his next album, scheduled for November 11 via a press conference in Atlanta. Man Against Machine was released via Pearl and RCA Nashville and was available online exclusively through GhostTunes. GhostTunes closed on March 3, 2017. Brooks' digital catalogue moved to Amazon Music, who maintain exclusive rights over it.

In September 2015, it was announced Brooks would reissue his album No Fences later in the year to commemorate its 25-year release anniversary. The release would include a new version of "Friends in Low Places", featuring George Strait, Jason Aldean, Florida Georgia Line, and Keith Urban singing along with Brooks. The album release has since been delayed due to royalty disputes. The track was later featured on his 2016 compilation album, The Ultimate Collection.

=== 2016–2017: Gunslinger, Christmas Together, and online streaming ===
On October 13, 2016, Brooks released the first single, "Baby, Let's Lay Down and Dance", from his upcoming album. The following week, Brooks released the upcoming album's title, Gunslinger, via Facebook Live. It was released on November 11, 2016, as a part of The Ultimate Collection, a compilation album Brooks released through Target. Brooks' other project for 2016 was a duet holiday album with wife Trisha Yearwood, Christmas Together.

After years of royalty disputes and an opposition to online music streaming, Brooks launched a streaming channel on Sirius XM Radio. He also reached an agreement to stream his entire catalogue via Amazon Music.

=== 2018–2025: Stadium Tour, residency, and other ventures ===
On June 19, 2018, Brooks released a new single, "All Day Long", the first off his 2020 album, Fun. The release also included a B-side, "The Road I'm On". In August 2018, Brooks announced new live album, Triple Live, to be released in partnership with Ticketmaster.

In August 2018, Brooks announced his Stadium Tour, which will visit thirty North American stadiums and showcase Brooks in a football-centric environment. In promotion of the tour, Brooks performed the first concert at the University of Notre Dame's football stadium in 2018 He released the second single, "Stronger Than Me", from his upcoming 2019 album release following a performance dedicated to his wife Trisha Yearwood at the CMA Awards. On August 14, 2021, he performed his largest ever ticketed concert at Memorial Stadium in Lincoln, Neb., selling 90,000 tickets.

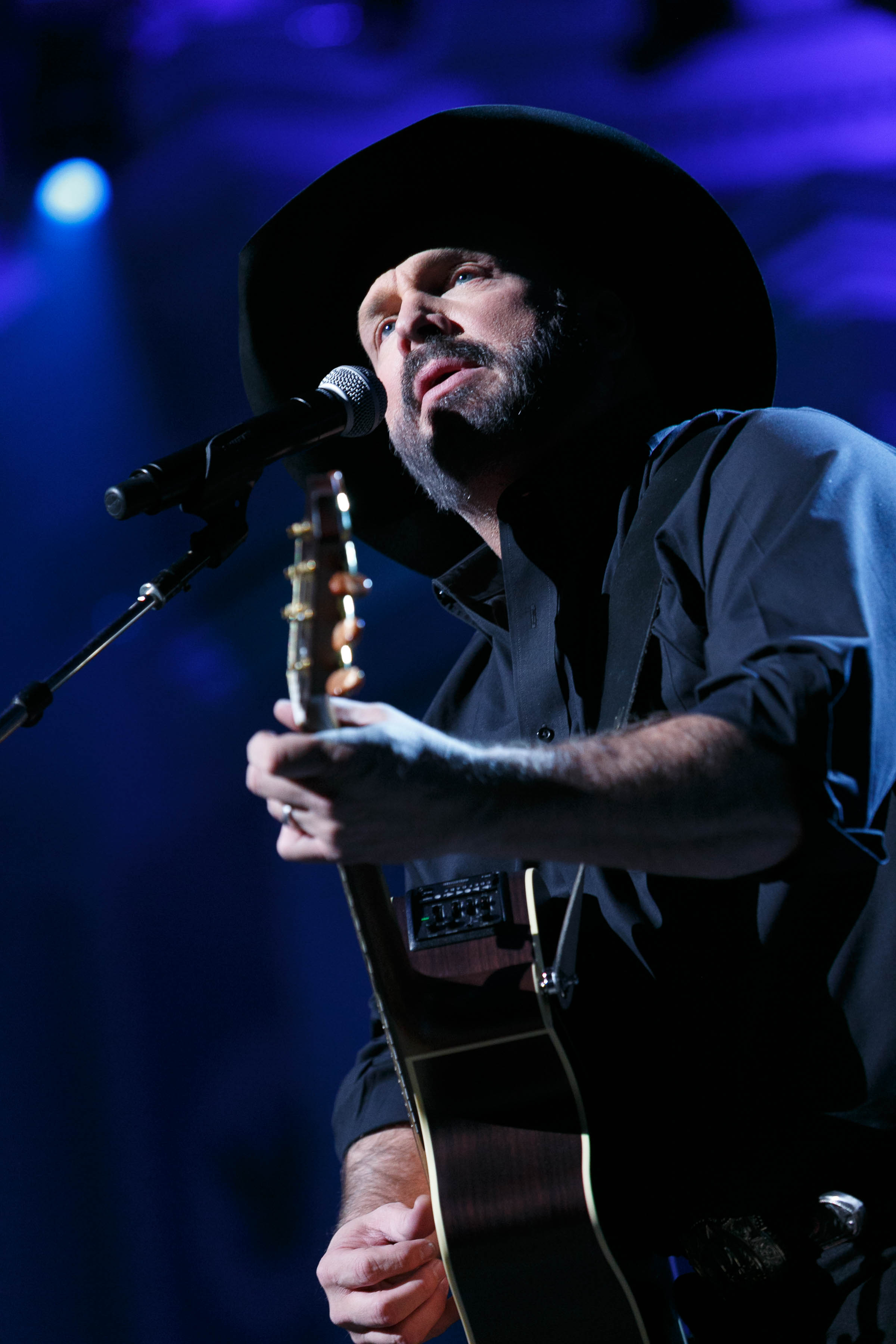
Brooks performing in 2020

The third single from his upcoming album, "Dive Bar", a duet with Blake Shelton, was released in June 2019. Brooks also embarked on the Dive Bar Tour, a promotional tour in support of the single, visiting seven dive bars throughout the United States.

During the COVID-19 pandemic, Brooks and wife Trisha Yearwood performed an informal concert broadcast on Facebook Live. The website crashed multiple times as an estimated 5.2 million streamed the broadcast. As a result of this, Brooks and Yearwood performed a concert in the same format the following week, broadcast live on CBS, along with a donation of $1 million to relief efforts. The CBS special scored an estimated 5.6 million viewers. On July 7, Brooks and Yearwood performed a "part 2" to their previous online concert, taking song requests and again broadcast on Facebook Live. On June 27, 2020, Brooks performed a concert broadcast at 300 drive-in theaters throughout North America.

Brooks released his most recent album, Fun, on November 20, 2020.

On January 20, 2021, Brooks performed "Amazing Grace" at the inauguration of Joe Biden. He said his performance was an opportunity "to serve" and is a "statement of unity."

On April 30, 2022, Brooks performed in Tiger Stadium on the campus of Louisiana State University in Baton Rouge, Louisiana. When he performed his signature hit "Callin' Baton Rouge," he became the second person, after LSU quarterback Tommy Hodson, to excite the crowd to a degree that the noise level registered on the university's seismograph – registering as an earthquake caused by excited fans.

On November 14, 2022, Brooks announced his second concert residency, Garth Brooks/Plus ONE, at The Colosseum at Caesars Palace in Las Vegas. He released his most recent album, Time Traveler, in November 2023.

On November 24, 2023, Brooks headlined an Amazon Music Live concert special, Garth Brooks: Dive Bar Concert. The concert took place at Brooks' Nashville bar Friends in Low Places Bar & Honky-Tonk. On January 9, 2025, Brooks, along with his wife Trisha Yearwood, performed the John Lennon song "Imagine" at the state funeral for former President Jimmy Carter, at the Washington National Cathedral in Washington, D.C.

=== 2026–present: Blame It All On My Roots and Ireland ===
On August 20, 2026, Brooks launched The Blame It All On My Roots Tour. Organized to coincide with the thirtieth anniversary of his 1996–1998 World Tour, the production was developed to bring back key visual and structural elements from that era.

On November 5, 2026, Brooks announced The Garth Brooks Irish Tour, a ten concert series across five Irish cities, scheduled for 2027.

== The G-Men ==
The vast majority of Brooks' recordings have used the same studio band, known collectively as the "G-Men". These are Bruce Bouton (steel guitar), Mark Casstevens (acoustic guitar), Mike Chapman (bass guitar), Rob Hajacos (fiddle), Chris Leuzinger (electric guitar), Milton Sledge (drums), and Bobby Wood (keyboards), along with sound engineer Mark Miller, who took over from Allen Reynolds as Brooks' producer starting with Blame It All on My Roots: Five Decades of Influences. Chapman died on June 13, 2016. While normally confined to being session musicians in Nashville, Brooks convinced Sledge and Leuzinger to play in his touring band for part of The Blame It All On My Roots Tour in 2026.

== Other ventures ==
=== Professional baseball ===
In 1998, Brooks launched his Touch 'em All Foundation with Major League Baseball. He also began with a short career in baseball, when he signed with the San Diego Padres for spring training in 1998 and 1999 as a publicity stunt to promote his foundation. The Padres donated Brooks' salary to his foundation. His performance on the field did not warrant management placing him on the regular season roster; however, he was offered a non-roster spot, but declined it. The following season, Brooks signed with the New York Mets. This spring-training stint was also a poor performance for Brooks, resulting in a zero-for-seventeen batting record. In 2004, Brooks returned to baseball with the Kansas City Royals. He got his first and only hit off Mike Myers during his final spring training game with the Royals.

In 2019, Brooks made a return to spring training, joining the Pittsburgh Pirates to promote his charity.

=== Pearl Records ===
In 2005, Brooks ended his association with Capitol Records and established his own record label, Pearl Records. Brooks has released four compilation albums via Pearl Records, as well as his 2014 and 2016 studio albums plus any future releases (also released through RCA Records Nashville).

=== Allentown Studios ===
In 2010, Brooks purchased Jack's Tracks, a recording studio founded by Jack Clement in 1971 and sold to Allen Reynolds in 1975, where most of Brooks' albums were recorded. In 2012, in honor of his 50th birthday, Brooks renamed the studio Allentown Studios.

=== GhostTunes ===
In September 2014, Brooks established GhostTunes, a digital music store featuring his own digital music, as well as over ten million songs from other artists. The store, contracted with "the big three" record labels, allows for autonomous pricing and distribution format, resulting in the most proper royalty payments for artists and songwriters. In March 2017, GhostTunes officially closed, merging with Amazon Music.

== Personal life ==
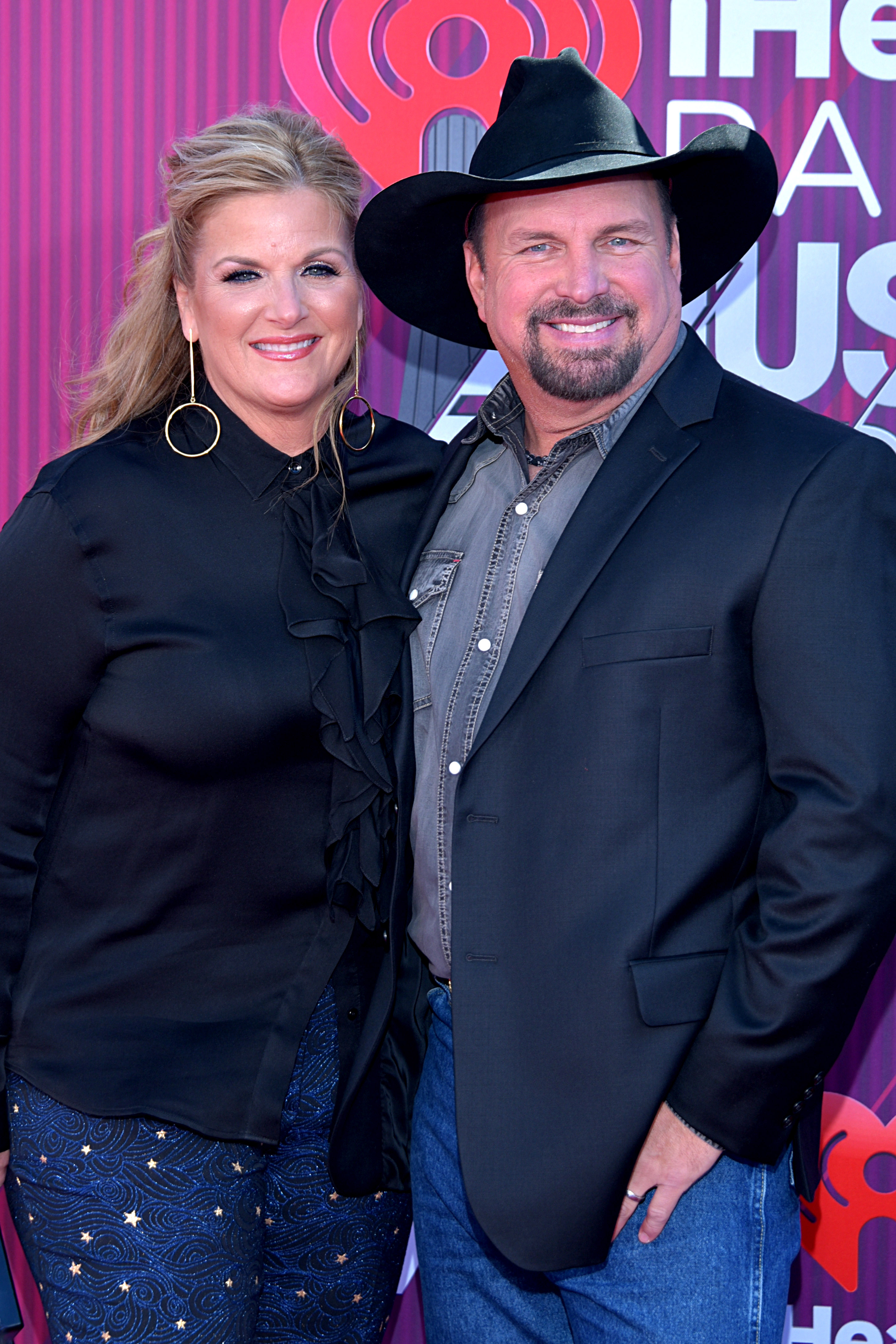
Brooks with his wife, Trisha Yearwood, at the 2019 iHeartRadio Music Awards

Brooks graduated from Oklahoma State University where he starred on the track and field team in the javelin throw. He later completed his MBA from Oklahoma State and participated in the commencement ceremony on May 6, 2011.

Brooks married songwriter Sandy Mahl on May 24, 1986. The couple had three daughters: Taylor Mayne Pearl (b. 1992), August Anna (b. 1994), and Allie Colleen Brooks (b. 1996). In July 2013 Brooks' granddaughter was born, the first child of his daughter August.

Brooks and Sandy separated in March 1999, announcing their plans to divorce on October 9, 2000, and filed for divorce on November 6, 2000. The divorce became final on December 17, 2001.

Brooks remarried on December 10, 2005, to country singer and cookbook author Trisha Yearwood. Yearwood has included various recipes created or inspired by Brooks in her published works, including Garth's Breakfast Bowl, a breakfast dish including cheese and garlic tortellini.

In June 2026, the Wall Street Journal revealed exclusively that Brooks was considering selling his back catalog, with the aim of raising about two billion dollars from any potential deal.

=== Charitable activities ===
In 1999, Brooks began the Teammates for Kids Foundation, which provides financial aid to charities for children. The organization breaks down into three categories spanning three different sports:

- Touch 'Em All Foundation – Baseball Division
- Top Shelf – Hockey Division
- Touchdown – Football Division

Brooks is also a fundraiser for various other charities, including a number of children's charities and famine relief. With wife Trisha Yearwood, Brooks sang Creedence Clearwater Revival's "Who'll Stop the Rain" on the Shelter from the Storm: A Concert for the Gulf Coast nationwide telethon for Hurricane Katrina relief. He performed the Garth Brooks: Live in LA benefit concerts, five sold-out concerts over a two-day period at the Staples Center in Los Angeles, California on January 25 and 26, 2008 (setting numerous records at the high-profile venue in the process and accomplished a feat done by no other artist in music history to perform all 5 shows in a 48-hour time frame). These concerts were staged to raise money for Fire Intervention Relief Effort, serving those impacted by the 2007 California wildfires. Tickets were priced at $40 each and all five shows (totaling more than 85,000 tickets) sold out in 58 minutes. CBS broadcast the first concert live as a telethon for additional fundraising.

In December 2010, Brooks played nine shows in less than a week in Nashville at Bridgestone Arena to benefit victims from the May 2010 Nashville flood. Over 140,000 tickets were sold and $5 million raised.

On July 6, 2013, Brooks joined with Toby Keith for a benefit concert for victims of the 2013 Oklahoma tornadoes. The sold-out show featured artists Mel Tillis, John Anderson, Willie Nelson, Trisha Yearwood, Sammy Hagar, Kellie Coffey, Ronnie Dunn, Carrie Underwood and Krystal Keith. It was held at Gaylord Family Oklahoma Memorial Stadium. Most recently, while between legs of his world tour in 2015, Brooks performed a sold-out concert in Barretos, Brazil to benefit the Hospital de Câncer de Barretos.

=== Support for gay rights ===
In a 1999 interview with George, Brooks said, "But if you're in love, you've got to follow your heart and trust that God will explain to us why we sometimes fall in love with people of the same sex." His song "We Shall Be Free" features the line, "When we're free to love anyone we choose", which has been interpreted as a reference to same-sex relationships. Brooks won a 1993 GLAAD Media Award for the song.

In 2000, Brooks appeared at the Equality Rocks benefit concert for gay rights. He sang a duet with openly gay singer George Michael.

Brooks' half-sister, Betsy Smittle, who died in 2013, was a musician who released her own album Rough Around the Edges (as Betsy) and was part of Brooks' band for some years. She also worked with the late country star Gus Hardin and other musicians in Tulsa. Smittle was a lesbian, and Brooks has credited her with some of the inspiration for his support for same-sex marriage.

=== Sexual assault allegation ===
In October 2024, Brooks was sued by his former hairstylist and makeup artist who claimed she was sexually harassed by him on several occasions. She also claimed that Brooks raped her during a trip the two took to film a Grammy tribute in 2019. Brooks has denied the allegations, calling them a "shakedown" and an extortion attempt. He initially sued his accuser under a pseudonym in an attempt to block the allegations from coming to light. In response to the lawsuit naming him, Brooks named his accuser in a countersuit.

== Awards and records ==
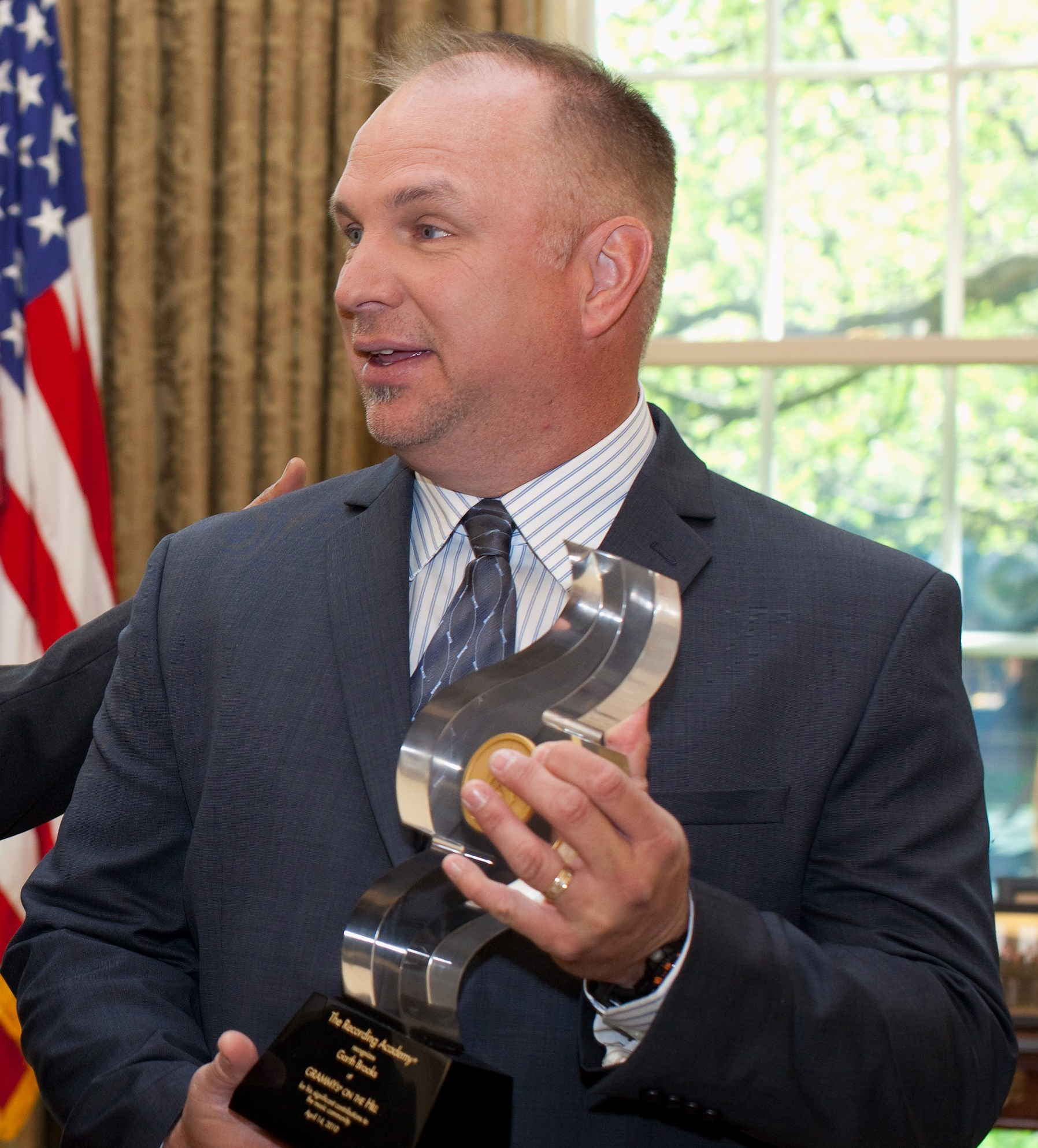
Brooks receiving the "Grammy on the Hill Award" in the Oval Office in 2010

Brooks has won a record 22 Academy of Country Music Awards and received a total of 47 overall nominations. He has won two Grammy Award and has 13 nominations, along with Billboard Music Awards, Country Music Association Awards, and many others. Brooks' work has earned awards and nominations in television and film as well, including the Primetime Emmy Awards and Golden Globe Awards. He was inducted into the Country Music Hall of Fame in 2012. In 2010, he was inducted into the Cheyenne Frontier Days Hall of Fame. He has also been inducted into the Songwriters Hall of Fame, and the Musicians Hall of Fame and Museum.

In 2020, Brooks was awarded the Library of Congress Gershwin Prize for Popular Song. Age 57 at the time he was named as the Gershwin honoree, he is the youngest recipient of the award. Also in 2020, Cher presented Brooks with the Billboard Icon Award.

In 2021, Brooks was named a recipient for the 43rd Annual Kennedy Center Honors.

=== Records ===
According to the Recording Industry Association of America, Brooks was the best-selling solo artist of the 20th century in the United States. This conclusion drew criticism from the press and many music fans who were convinced that Elvis Presley had sold more records, but had been short-changed in the rankings due to faulty RIAA certification methods during his lifetime. Brooks, while proud of his sales accomplishments, stated that he too believed that Presley must have sold more.

The RIAA has since reexamined their methods for counting certifications. Under their revised methods, Presley became the best-selling solo artist in U.S. history, making Brooks the number-two solo artist, ranking third overall, as the Beatles have sold more albums than either he or Presley. The revision brought more criticism of the accuracy of the RIAA's figures, this time from Brooks' followers. On November 5, 2007, Brooks was again named the best selling solo artist in US history, surpassing Presley after audited sales of 123 million were announced. In December 2010, several more of Presley's albums received certifications from the RIAA. As a result, Elvis again surpassed Brooks. As of October 2014, the RIAA lists Presley's total sales at 134.5 million and Brooks' at 134 million. Subsequently, Man Against Machine has been certified by the RIAA as Platinum and listing Brooks sales as exceeding 136 million, placing Brooks again as the number 1 selling solo artist.

In 2012, Brooks officially passed the Beatles as the top-selling act of the past 20 years, moving 68.5 million units worldwide, almost 5 million more than the Beatles. In May 2014, Brooks' total album sales reached 69,544,000 copies, which makes him the best-selling album artist in the U.S., ahead of the Beatles (65,730,000), Metallica (54,365,000), Mariah Carey (54,280,000) and Celine Dion (52,234,000).

In September 2016, Brooks became the first and only artist in music history to achieve seven career Diamond Award albums, according to the RIAA (surpassing the previous tied record of six next to The Beatles).

On June 16, 2021, Brooks won the Pollstar award as the "country touring artist of the decade" (2010s). Brooks thanked his band for the companionship during all those years.

=== Other ===
In 2014, Brooks was awarded the Arkansas Traveler certificate.

== Discography ==
- Garth Brooks (1989)
- No Fences (1990)
- Ropin' the Wind (1991)
- Beyond the Season (1992)
- The Chase (1992)
- In Pieces (1993)
- Fresh Horses (1995)
- Sevens (1997)
- Garth Brooks in... the Life of Chris Gaines (1999)
- Garth Brooks & the Magic of Christmas (1999)
- Scarecrow (2001)
- Man Against Machine (2014)
- Christmas Together (with Trisha Yearwood) (2016)
- Gunslinger (2016)
- Fun (2020)
- Time Traveler (2023)

== Filmography ==
Notable television appearances by Garth Brooks
Year	Title	Role	Notes
1989	Nashville Beat	Himself	TV movie
1990	Hee Haw	Himself	4 episodes
1991	Empty Nest	Himself	Episode: "Country Weston"
1994	Mad About You	Himself	Episode: "Up All Night"
1995	Sesame Street	Himself	Episode: "A New Way to Walk"
1996	Muppets Tonight	Himself	Episode: "Garth Brooks"
1998	Saturday Night Live	Himself	Host, musical guest
1999	Saturday Night Live	Himself; Chris Gaines	Host, musical guest (as Gaines)
1999	Behind the Music	Chris Gaines	Episode: "Behind the Life of Chris Gaines"
2016	The Voice	Himself / Mentor	Season 11
2022	America's National Parks	Narrator	10 episodes

== Concert tours and residencies ==
- The Garth Brooks World Tour (1993–1994)
- The Garth Brooks World Tour (1996–1998)
- Garth at Wynn (2009–2014)
- The Garth Brooks World Tour (2014–2017)
- Dive Bar Tour (2019)
- The Garth Brooks Stadium Tour (2019–2022)
- Garth Brooks/Plus ONE (2023–2024)
- The Blame It All On My Roots Tour (2026–present)

== See also ==
- List of best-selling music artists
- List of best-selling music artists in the United States
- List of highest-grossing concert tours

== Sources ==
- Cox, Patsi Bale (2009), The Garth Factor: The Career Behind Country's Big Boom, New York: Center Street, ISBN 978-1-59995-099-0
