= Tim McGraw singles discography =

Tim McGraw discography
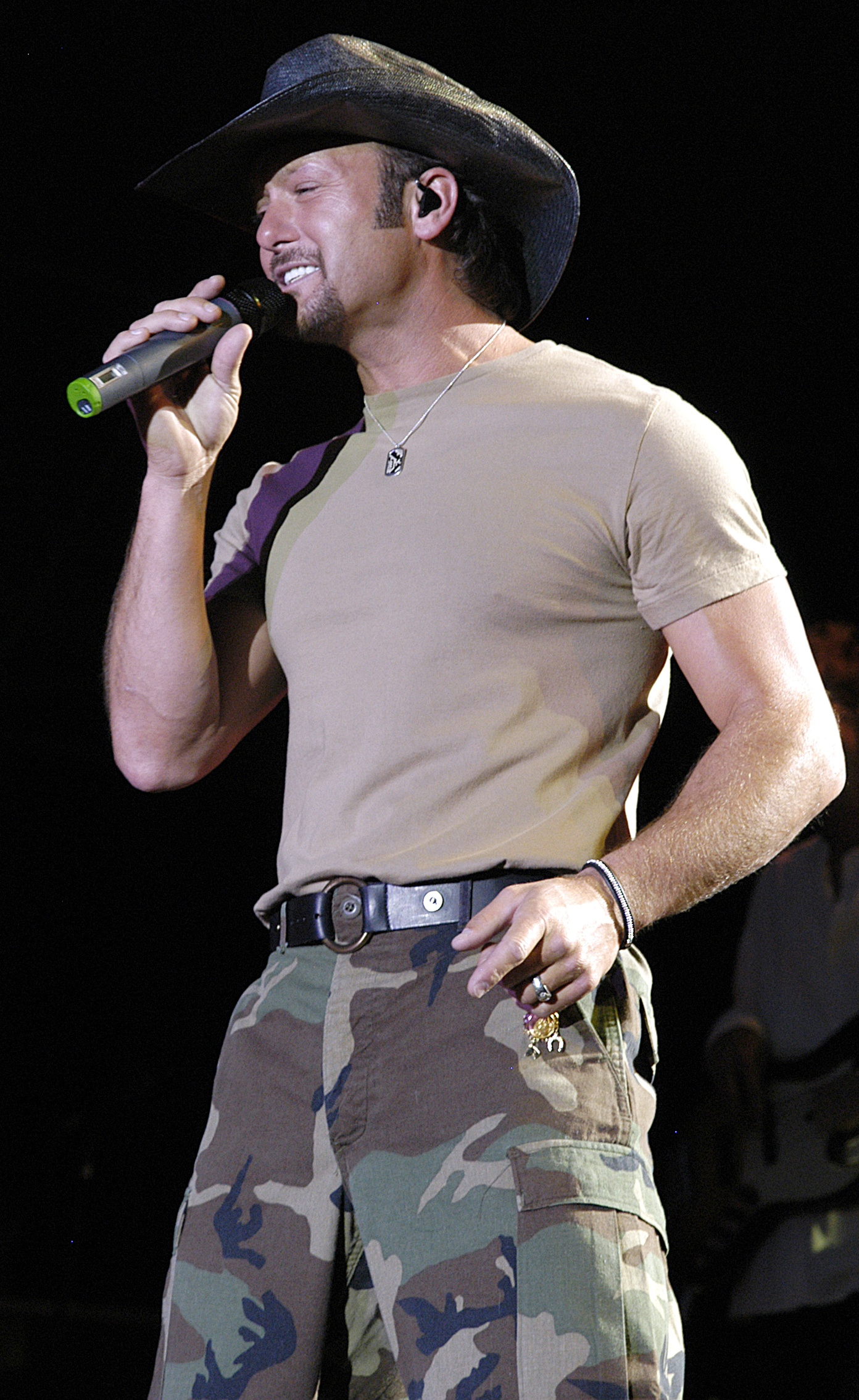
- Singles: 76
- Music videos: 61

American singer and songwriter Tim McGraw has had 76 singles spanning 16 studio albums.

Although McGraw's first three chart singles all missed top 40 on Billboard Hot Country Songs, he broke through in 1994 with "Indian Outlaw", a number 8 country hit, which also reached number 15 on the Billboard Hot 100. Since then, all of his singles have reached top 40 on the country chart, with only nine missing top 10. Thirty gone to number one on the US country chart, starting with 1994's "Don't Take the Girl". Three of his singles—1997's "It's Your Love" (a duet with his wife, Faith Hill), 1998's "Just to See You Smile", and 2004's "Live Like You Were Dying"—are the number one country hit of that year according to Billboard Year-End. "Live Like You Were Dying" is also his longest-lasting number one, at seven non-consecutive weeks. Thirty-eight have also reached the Top 40 on the US Billboard Hot 100.

Since 1998's "One of These Days", almost all of McGraw's singles have also entered the Billboard Hot 100, as did "Indian Outlaw", "Don't Take the Girl", 1995's "I Like It, I Love It", and "It's Your Love". His highest solo peak on Hot 100 is 1999's "Please Remember Me" at number 10, although "It's Your Love" hit number 7 on that chart. Four of his singles have also entered the Hot Adult Contemporary Tracks chart, including a cover of Elton John's "Tiny Dancer". McGraw's version, released solely to that format, was a number 13 hit. "Live Like You Were Dying", "When the Stars Go Blue", and "My Little Girl", the latter two both having been released in 2006, also entered the AC chart, with "Live Like You Were Dying" at number 4 being his highest peak there. Seventeen of his singles also hold RIAA certification: "Indian Outlaw", "Don't Take the Girl", "I Like It, I Love It", "It's Your Love", "Something Like That", "Live Like You Were Dying", "When the Stars Go Blue", "My Little Girl", "Last Dollar (Fly Away)", "I Need You", "If You're Reading This", "Southern Voice", "Felt Good on My Lips", "Better Than I Used to Be", "Truck Yeah", "One of Those Nights", and "Highway Don't Care" .

McGraw has also sung guest vocals on other singles for Hill, as well as on Jo Dee Messina's 2001 number 1 single "Bring On the Rain" and Nelly's number 3 pop hit "Over and Over", which was not released to country radio. He also sang guest vocals on Def Leppard's 2008 single "Nine Lives", which did not make the Billboard charts.

== Singles ==
=== As lead artist ===
==== 1990s ====
List of singles released in the 1990s decade, with selected chart positions, showing year released, certifications and album name
Title	Year	Peak positions			Certifications	Album
Title	Year	US	US Country	CAN Country	Certifications	Album
"What Room Was the Holiday In"	1991	—	—	—		Tim McGraw
"Welcome to the Club"	1992	—	47	—		Tim McGraw
"Memory Lane"	1993	—	60	—		Tim McGraw
"Two Steppin' Mind"	1993	—	71	—		Tim McGraw
"Indian Outlaw"	1994	15	8	24	RIAA: Platinum	Not a Moment Too Soon
"Don't Take the Girl"	1994	17	1	1	RIAA: 3× Platinum	Not a Moment Too Soon
"Down on the Farm"	1994	—	2	3	RIAA: Gold	Not a Moment Too Soon
"Not a Moment Too Soon"	1994	—	1	1		Not a Moment Too Soon
"Refried Dreams"	1995	— (Note: "Refried Dreams" did not enter the Billboard Hot 100, but peaked at number six on the Bubbling Under Hot 100 Singles chart.)	5	3		Not a Moment Too Soon
"I Like It, I Love It"	1995	25	1	1	RIAA: 2× Platinum	All I Want
"Can't Be Really Gone"	1995	87	2	4		All I Want
"All I Want Is a Life"	1996	—	5	2		All I Want
"She Never Lets It Go to Her Heart"	1996	—	1	5		All I Want
"Maybe We Should Just Sleep on It"	1996	—	4	1		All I Want
"It's Your Love" (featuring Faith Hill)	1997	7	1	1	RIAA: 5× Platinum	Everywhere
"Everywhere"	1997	—	1	2	RIAA: Gold	Everywhere
"Just to See You Smile"	1997	—	1	1	RIAA: 2× Platinum	Everywhere
"One of These Days"	1998	74	2	1		Everywhere
"Where the Green Grass Grows"	1998	79	1	1	RIAA: 2× Platinum	Everywhere
"For a Little While"	1998	37	2	1		Everywhere
"Please Remember Me"	1999	10	1	1	RIAA: Platinum	A Place in the Sun
"Something Like That"	1999	28	1	1	RIAA: 3× Platinum	A Place in the Sun
"My Best Friend"	1999	29	1	4	RIAA: 2× Platinum	A Place in the Sun
"—" denotes releases that did not chart

==== 2000s ====
List of singles released in the 2000s decade, with selected chart positions, showing year released, certifications and album name
Title	Year	Peak chart positions							Certifications	Album
Title	Year	US	US Country	US AC	US Adult Pop	CAN	CAN Country	UK	Certifications	Album
"Some Things Never Change"	2000	58	7	—	—	—	1	—		A Place in the Sun
"My Next Thirty Years"	2000	27	1	—	—	—	6	—	RIAA: Gold	A Place in the Sun
"Grown Men Don't Cry"	2001	25	1	—	—	—	*	—		Set This Circus Down
"Angry All the Time"	2001	38	1	—	—	—	*	—		Set This Circus Down
"The Cowboy in Me"	2001	33	1	—	—	—	*	—	RIAA: Gold	Set This Circus Down
"Unbroken"	2002	26	1	—	—	—	*	—		Set This Circus Down
"Red Rag Top"	2002	40	5	—	—	—	*	—	RIAA: Platinum	Tim McGraw and the Dancehall Doctors
"Tiny Dancer" (Note: "Tiny Dancer" was only released to the AC format, and entered the country charts on unsolicited airplay.)	2002	—	49	13	—	—	*	—		Tim McGraw and the Dancehall Doctors
"She's My Kind of Rain"	2003	27	2	—	—	—	*	—	RIAA: Platinum	Tim McGraw and the Dancehall Doctors
"Real Good Man"	2003	27	1	—	—	—	*	—	RIAA: Platinum	Tim McGraw and the Dancehall Doctors
"Watch the Wind Blow By"	2003	32	1	—	—	—	*	—		Tim McGraw and the Dancehall Doctors
"Live Like You Were Dying"	2004	29	1	4	21	—	1	94	RIAA: 5× Platinum; RMNZ: Gold	Live Like You Were Dying
"Back When"	2004	30	1	—	—	—	1	—	RIAA: Gold	Live Like You Were Dying
"Drugs or Jesus"	2005	87	14	—	—	—	6	—		Live Like You Were Dying
"Do You Want Fries with That"	2005	59	5	—	—	—	3	—		Live Like You Were Dying
"My Old Friend"	2005	79	6	—	—	—	4	—		Live Like You Were Dying
"When the Stars Go Blue"	2006	37	4	12	35	—	1	—	RIAA: Platinum	Reflected: Greatest Hits Vol. 2
"My Little Girl"	2006	35	3	15	—	—	3	—	RIAA: 2× Platinum	Reflected: Greatest Hits Vol. 2
"Last Dollar (Fly Away)"	2007	13	1	—	—	—	1	—	RIAA: Gold	Let It Go
"I Need You" (featuring Faith Hill)	2007	50	8	—	—	75	4	—	RIAA: Platinum	Let It Go
"If You're Reading This" (Note: "If You're Reading This" originally charted from unsolicited airplay of a live recording made during the 2007 Academy of Country Music ceremony; this live recording was added to later releases of Let It Go.)	2007	41	3	—	—	81	12	—	RIAA: Platinum	Let It Go
"Suspicions"	2007	87	12	—	—	—	12	—		Let It Go
"Kristofferson"	2008	— (Note: "Kristofferson" did not enter the Billboard Hot 100, but peaked at number 10 on the Bubbling Under Hot 100 Singles chart.)	16	—	—	—	19	—		Let It Go
"Let It Go"	2008	47	2	—	—	75	4	—		Let It Go
"Nothin' to Die For"	2009	68	5	—	—	76	3	—		Let It Go
"It's a Business Doing Pleasure with You"	2009	59	13	—	—	53	3	—		Southern Voice
"Southern Voice"	2009	49	1	—	—	58	1	—	RIAA: Platinum	Southern Voice
"—" denotes releases that did not chart "*" denotes periods where charts did not exist or were not archived

==== 2010s ====
List of singles released in the 2010s decade, with selected chart positions, showing year released, certifications and album name
Title	Year	Peak chart positions								Certifications	Album
Title	Year	US	US Country	US Country Airplay	US AC	AUS	CAN	CAN Country	UK	Certifications	Album
"Still"	2010	91	16		—	—	94	11	—		Southern Voice
"Felt Good on My Lips"	2010	26	1		22	—	36	1	—	RIAA: Platinum	Number One Hits
"Me and Tennessee" (with Gwyneth Paltrow)	2011	—	34		—	—	—	—	63		Country Strong
"Better Than I Used to Be"	2011	52	5		—	—	71	2	—	RIAA: Platinum	Emotional Traffic
"Right Back Atcha Babe"	2012	—	59		—	—	—	—	—		Emotional Traffic
"Truck Yeah"	2012	57	11	10	—	—	52	3	—	RIAA: Platinum	Two Lanes of Freedom
"One of Those Nights"	2012	32	3	1	—	—	38	1	—	RIAA: Platinum	Two Lanes of Freedom
"Highway Don't Care" (featuring Taylor Swift and Keith Urban)	2013	22	4	1	—	73	21	2	—	RIAA: 3× Platinum; ARIA: Platinum; RMNZ: Gold	Two Lanes of Freedom
"Southern Girl"	2013	42	4	2	—	—	61	1	—	RIAA: Platinum	Two Lanes of Freedom
"Lookin' for That Girl"	2014	85	18	15	—	—	47	30	—		Sundown Heaven Town
"Meanwhile Back at Mama's" (featuring Faith Hill)	2014	41	7	2	—	—	47	1	—	RIAA: Platinum	Sundown Heaven Town
"Shotgun Rider"	2014	38	1	1	—	—	54	1	—	RIAA: Platinum	Sundown Heaven Town
"Diamond Rings and Old Barstools" (with Catherine Dunn)	2015	55	11	3	—	—	78	10	—	RIAA: Gold	Sundown Heaven Town
"Top of the World"	2015	73	11	5	—	—	89	6	—		Damn Country Music
"Humble and Kind"	2016	30	1	1	13	—	37	1	—	RIAA: 4× Platinum; ARIA: Platinum; MC: 2× Platinum; RMNZ: Gold	Damn Country Music
"How I'll Always Be"	2016	70	9	3	—	—	—	9	—	RIAA: Gold	Damn Country Music
"Speak to a Girl" (with Faith Hill)	2017	61	6	19	—	—	—	27	—		The Rest of Our Life
"The Rest of Our Life" (with Faith Hill)	2017	98	18	25	—	—	—	48	—		The Rest of Our Life
"Neon Church"	2018	—	24	20	—	—	—	35	—		Non-album singles
"Thought About You"	2019	—	26	17	—	—	—	50	—		Non-album singles
"—" denotes releases that did not chart

==== 2020s ====
List of singles released in the 2020s decade, with selected chart positions, showing year released, certifications and album name
Title	Year	Peak chart positions						Certifications	Album
Title	Year	US	US Country	US Country Airplay	US AC	CAN	CAN Country	Certifications	Album
"I Called Mama"	2020	53	8	2	23	77	2	RIAA: Gold	Here on Earth
"Undivided" (with Tyler Hubbard)	2021	76	23	16	—	66	4	MC: Gold	Here on Earth
"7500 OBO"	2021	66	15	4	—	57	6	RIAA: Gold	Here on Earth
"Standing Room Only"	2023	60	14	2	—	—	3		Standing Room Only
"One Bad Habit"	2024	— (Note: "One Bad Habit" did not enter the Billboard Hot 100, but peaked at number two on the Bubbling Under Hot 100 chart.)	26	5	—	—	11		Poet's Resumé
"Paper Umbrellas" (featuring Parker McCollum)	2025	—	—	43	—	—	56		Non-album singles
"McArthur" (with Hardy, Eric Church, and Morgan Wallen)	2026	31	6	17	—	41	35		Non-album singles
"—" denotes releases that did not chart

=== As a featured artist ===
List of singles as featured artist, with selected chart positions, showing year released, certifications and album name
Title	Year	Peak chart positions									Certifications	Album
Title	Year	US	US Country	US Country Airplay	US AC	US Adult Pop	AUS	CAN	CAN Country	UK	Certifications	Album
"Hope" (among various artists)	1996	—	57		—	—	—	—	—	—		Non-album single
"Just to Hear You Say That You Love Me" (Faith Hill with Tim McGraw)	1998	—	3		—	—	—	—	4	—		Faith
"Let's Make Love" (Faith Hill with Tim McGraw)	2000	54	6		—	—	—	—	5	—		Breathe
"Bring On the Rain" (Jo Dee Messina with Tim McGraw)	2001	36	1		6	—	—	—	—	—		Burn
"Over and Over" (Nelly featuring Tim McGraw)	2004	3	—		34	16	1	2	—	1	RIAA: Gold; BPI: Gold; RMNZ: Platinum	Suit
"Like We Never Loved at All" (Faith Hill featuring Tim McGraw)	2005	45	5		9	—	—	—	—	—		Fireflies
"Across the Universe" (Alicia Keys, Alison Krauss, Billie Joe Armstrong, Bono, Brian Wilson, Norah Jones, Steven Tyler, Stevie Wonder, Tim McGraw & Velvet Revolver)	2005	22	—	—	—	—	—	—	—	—		Non-album single
"Nine Lives" (Def Leppard featuring Tim McGraw)	2008	—	—		—	—	—	—	—	—		Songs from the Sparkle Lounge
"Feel Like a Rock Star" (Kenny Chesney with Tim McGraw)	2012	40	11		—	—	—	33	9	—	RIAA: Gold	Welcome to the Fishbowl
"Lovin' Lately" (Big & Rich featuring Tim McGraw)	2016	— (Note: "Lovin' Lately" did not enter the Billboard Hot 100, but peaked at number 6 on the Bubbling Under Hot 100 Singles chart.)	26	14	—	—	—	—	—	—		Gravity
"May We All" (Florida Georgia Line featuring Tim McGraw)	2016	30	2	1	—	—	—	46	1	—	RIAA: 3× Platinum; RMNZ: Gold	Dig Your Roots
"Forever Country" (as part of Artists of Then, Now & Forever)	2016	21	1	33	—	—	26	45	25	—		Non-album single
"—" denotes releases that did not chart

== Other charted songs ==
List of other charted songs, with selected chart positions, showing year released and album name
Title	Year	Peak chart positions				Album
Title	Year	US	US Country	US Country Airplay	US Country Digital	Album
"You Turn Me On"	1997	—	75		—	Everywhere
"The Trouble with Never"	2000	—	66		—	A Place in the Sun
"Seventeen"	2000	—	64		—	A Place in the Sun
"Señorita Margarita"	2000	—	74		—	A Place in the Sun
"Things Change" (Note: Stations played both live and studio versions; a studio version later appeared on Set This Circus Down.)	2001	—	32		—	Set This Circus Down
"Telluride"	2001	—	52		—	Set This Circus Down
"I've Got Friends That Do"	2006	—	49		—	Tim McGraw Reflected: Greatest Hits Vol. 2
"Christmas All Over the World"	2011	—	30		—	Non-album song
"The One That Got Away"	2012	— (Note: "The One That Got Away" did not enter the Billboard Hot 100, but peaked at number three on the Bubbling Under Hot 100 Singles chart.)	—	—	19	Emotional Traffic
"Halo"	2012	— (Note: "Halo" did not enter the Billboard Hot 100, but peaked at number 23 on the Bubbling Under Hot 100 Singles chart.)	—	—	26	Emotional Traffic
"Two Lanes of Freedom"	2013	—	49	—	—	Two Lanes of Freedom
"City Lights"	2014	—	46	—	40	Sundown Heaven Town
"Sick of Me"	2014	—	50	—	47	Sundown Heaven Town
"Overrated"	2014	—	32	—	18	Sundown Heaven Town
"Keep on Truckin'"	2014	—	—	60	—	Sundown Heaven Town
"Here Tonight" (with Gracie McGraw)	2015	—	—	—	49	Damn Country Music
"Keep Your Eyes on Me" (with Faith Hill)	2017	—	44	—	21	The Shack and Here On Earth Ultimate Edition
"Wrong Ones" (Post Malone featuring Tim McGraw)	2024	23	11	—	—	F-1 Trillion
"—" denotes releases that did not chart

== Videography ==
=== Music videos ===
List of music videos, showing year released and directors
Title	Year	Director(s)
"Welcome to the Club"	1992	Julie Cypher
"Memory Lane"	1993	Michael Merriman
"Indian Outlaw"	1994	Sherman Halsey
"Indian Outlaw" (Dance Mix version)	1994	Sherman Halsey
"Don't Take the Girl"	1994	Sherman Halsey
"Down on the Farm"	1994	Sherman Halsey
"Not a Moment Too Soon"	1994	Sherman Halsey
"Refried Dreams"	1995	Sherman Halsey
"I Like It, I Love It"	1995	Sherman Halsey
"Can't Be Really Gone"	1995	Sherman Halsey
"All I Want Is a Life"	1996	Sherman Halsey
"Maybe We Should Just Sleep on It"	1996	Sherman Halsey
"Hope" (as part of Various artist)	1996	Frank W. Ockenfels III
"It's Your Love" (with Faith Hill)	1997	Sherman Halsey
"Everywhere"	1997	Sherman Halsey
"One of These Days"	1998	Sherman Halsey
"Just to Hear You Say That You Love Me" (with Faith Hill)	1998	Jim Shea
"Please Remember Me"	1999	Randee St. Nicholas
"Something Like That"	1999	Scott Scovill
"Let's Make Love" (with Faith Hill)	2000	Lili Fini Zanuck
"Angel Boy"	2001	Sherman Halsey
"The Cowboy in Me"	2002	Sherman Halsey
"She's My Kind of Rain"	2002	Sherman Halsey
"Real Good Man" / "The Ride" (Live)	2003	Sherman Halsey
"Live Like You Were Dying"	2004	Sherman Halsey
"Over and Over" (with Nelly)	2004	Erik White
"Drugs or Jesus"	2005	Sherman Halsey
"Like We Never Loved at All" (with Faith Hill)	2005	Sophie Muller
"When the Stars Go Blue"	2006	Sherman Halsey
"My Little Girl"	2006	Sherman Halsey, Michael Mayer
"Last Dollar (Fly Away)"	2007	Sherman Halsey
"I Need You" (with Faith Hill)	2007	Sherman Halsey
"Suspicions" (Live)	2008	Sherman Halsey
"Nine Lives" (with Def Leppard)	2008	Sherman Halsey
"Southern Voice"	2009	Sherman Halsey
"Still"	2010	Sherman Halsey
"Still" (Live)	2010	Sherman Halsey
"Felt Good on My Lips"	2010	Nick Davidge, Grant James
"Me and Tennessee" (with Gwyneth Paltrow)	2011	Shana Feste
"Feel Like a Rock Star" (with Kenny Chesney)	2012	Shaun Silva
"Truck Yeah"	2012	Chris Hicky
"One of Those Nights"	2012	Sherman Halsey
"Nashville Without You"	2013	Thien Phan
"Highway Don't Care" (featuring Taylor Swift and Keith Urban)	2013	Shane Drake
"Southern Girl"	2013	Shane Drake
"Two Lanes of Freedom"	2013	Shane Drake
"Lookin' for That Girl"	2014	Sophie Muller
"Meanwhile Back at Mama's" (with Faith Hill)	2014	Shane Drake
"Shotgun Rider"	2014	Bennett Miller
"Diamond Rings and Old Barstools"	2015	Brian Olinger
"Lovin' Lately" (featuring Big & Rich)	2015	Trey Fanjoy
"Top of the World"	2015	McGraw Music
"Humble and Kind"	2016	Wes Edwards
"May We All" (with Florida Georgia Line)	2016	TK McKamy
"Forever Country" (as part ofArtists of Then, Now & Forever)	2016	Joseph Kahn
"Speak to a Girl" (with Faith Hill)	2017	Sophie Muller
"The Rest of Our Life" (with Faith Hill)	2017	Grant Singer
"Neon Church"	2018	David Abbott
"Way Down" (featuring Shy Carter)	2019	—N/a
"Standing Room Only"	2023	Andrew Sandler
"One Bad Habit"	2024	Tyler Conrad
