= 2008 in country music =

This is a list of notable events in country music that took place in 2008.

== Events ==
- April 27 – A story in the New York Daily News reported a possible long-term relationship between Mindy McCready and baseball star Roger Clemens that began when she was 15 years old. Though Clemens' attorney, Rusty Hardin, acknowledged that McCready was a "close family friend," Hardin denied the affair and threatened to bring a defamation suit against him. However, McCready would state that the relationship was sexual, and spoke about her affair with Clemens in more detail on the November 17 broadcast of Inside Edition.
- May 10 – Garth Brooks inducted Carrie Underwood on Grand Ole Opry.
- May 15 – People Magazine reported Canadian singer Shania Twain and her husband, music producer Robert John "Mutt" Lange, had separated after 14 years of marriage. The couple were married on December 28, 1993, after Twain met Lange at Nashville's Fan Fair earlier in the year.
- May 23 – Anne Murray performs her final concert in Toronto, Ontario, Canada and retires from show business.
- June 14 – Sara Evans and radio show host/former University of Alabama quarterback Jay Barker are married in Franklin, Tennessee, with their children as their attendants.
- November 11 – Country music superstar Reba McEntire departs her longtime record label MCA Nashville, after 24 years and signed to The Valory Music Co., sister label to Big Machine Records. McEntire and Big Machine CEO Scott Borchetta had previously worked together in the 1990s when Borchetta was senior president of promotion for MCA Nashville.
- November 20 – Julianne Hough announces that she would not be returning for the foreseeable future to Dancing with the Stars in order to further her country music career.
- December 7 – The John F. Kennedy Center for the Performing Arts honors George Jones for his lifetime contributions to the arts.
- December 18 – Equity Music Group, a label owned by Clint Black, closes after five years in operation.

== Top hits of the year ==
The following songs placed within the Top 20 on the Hot Country Songs or Canada Country charts in 2008:

US	CAN	Single	Artist	Reference
1	1	All-American Girl	Carrie Underwood	
14	41	All I Ever Wanted	Chuck Wicks	
1	3	All I Want to Do	Sugarland	
4	4	All Summer Long	Kid Rock	
15	45	Another Try	Josh Turner featuring Trisha Yearwood	
16	41	Anything Goes	Randy Houser	
1	8	Back When I Knew It All	Montgomery Gentry	
1	2	Better as a Memory	Kenny Chesney	
15	26	Bob That Head	Rascal Flatts	
1	10	Chicken Fried	Zac Brown Band	
1	5	Cleaning This Gun (Come On in Boy)	Rodney Atkins	
18	16	Come On Over	Jessica Simpson	
10	28	Country Man	Luke Bryan	
1	3	Do You Believe Me Now	Jimmy Wayne	
1	3	Don't Think I Don't Think About It	Darius Rucker	
5	2	Everybody	Keith Urban	
1	1	Everybody Wants to Go to Heaven	Kenny Chesney featuring The Wailers	
2	5	Every Day	Rascal Flatts	
15	16	Every Other Weekend	Reba McEntire featuring Kenny Chesney	
11	8	Get My Drink On	Toby Keith	
11	11	God Must Be Busy	Brooks & Dunn	
1	1	Good Time	Alan Jackson	
7	19	Gunpowder & Lead	Miranda Lambert	
9	36	Holler Back	The Lost Trailers	
1	36	Home	Blake Shelton	
1	1	I Saw God Today	George Strait	
2	9	I Still Miss You	Keith Anderson	
10	31	I'll Walk	Bucky Covington	
1	1	I'm Still a Guy	Brad Paisley	
36	1	In My Next Life	Terri Clark	
10	28	International Harvester	Craig Morgan	
16	45	It Ain't No Crime	Joe Nichols	
11	32	It's Good to Be Us	Bucky Covington	
11	39	Johnny & June	Heidi Newfield	
1	2	Just a Dream	Carrie Underwood	
1	2	Just Got Started Lovin' You	James Otto	
16	19	Kristofferson	Tim McGraw	
1	3	Last Name	Carrie Underwood	
6	6	Laughed Until We Cried	Jason Aldean	
13	23	Learning How to Bend	Gary Allan	
2	4	Let It Go	Tim McGraw	
1	1	Letter to Me	Brad Paisley	
11	18	Lookin' for a Good Time	Lady Antebellum	
3	5	Love Don't Live Here	Lady Antebellum	
2	17	Love Is a Beautiful Thing	Phil Vassar	
9	32	Love Remembers	Craig Morgan	
1	1	Love Story	Taylor Swift	
3	1	Picture to Burn	Taylor Swift	
3	1	Put a Girl in It	Brooks & Dunn	
4	7	Ready, Set, Don't Go	Billy Ray Cyrus with Miley Cyrus	
15	47	Relentless	Jason Aldean	
1	5	Roll with Me	Montgomery Gentry	
1	4	She Never Cried in Front of Me	Toby Keith	
13	17	She's a Hottie	Toby Keith	
2	2	Shiftwork	Kenny Chesney duet with George Strait	
1	5	Should've Said No	Taylor Swift	
1	3	Small Town Southern Man	Alan Jackson	
15	48	Something About a Woman	Jake Owen	
2	5	Stay	Sugarland	
5	11	Stealing Cinderella	Chuck Wicks	
13	30	Stronger Woman	Jewel	
12	12	Suspicions	Tim McGraw	
20	—	Takin' Off This Pain	Ashton Shepherd	
18	—	That Song in My Head	Julianne Hough	
16	33	Things That Never Cross a Man's Mind	Kellie Pickler	
7	3	Troubadour	George Strait	
5	13	Trying to Stop Your Leaving	Dierks Bentley	
1	1	Waitin' on a Woman	Brad Paisley	
2	11	Watching Airplanes	Gary Allan	
10	38	We Weren't Crazy	Josh Gracin	
3	8	What Do Ya Think About That	Montgomery Gentry	
3	4	What Kinda Gone	Chris Cagle	
2	2	Winner at a Losing Game	Rascal Flatts	
19	19	Workin' for a Livin'	Garth Brooks & Huey Lewis	
21	5	You Can Let Go	Crystal Shawanda	
1	1	You Look Good in My Shirt	Keith Urban	
1	1	You're Gonna Miss This	Trace Adkins	

== Top new album releases ==
The following albums placed within the Top 50 on the Top Country Albums charts in 2008:

US	Album	Artist	Record label	Release date	Reference
1	35 Biggest Hits	Toby Keith	Show Dog	May 6	
4	All I Intended to Be	Emmylou Harris	Nonesuch	June 10	
8	Anne Murray Duets: Friends and Legends	Anne Murray	Manhattan/EMI	January 15	
3	Around the Bend	Randy Travis	Warner Bros. Nashville	July 15	
3	Back When I Knew It All	Montgomery Gentry	Columbia Nashville	June 10	
2	Backwoods Barbie	Dolly Parton	Dolly	February 26	
1	Beautiful Eyes	Taylor Swift	Big Machine	July 15	
4	Call Me Crazy	Lee Ann Womack	MCA Nashville	October 21	
3	Christmas Duets	Elvis Presley	RCA	October 14	
3	C'mon!	Keith Anderson	Columbia Nashville	August 5	
2	Damn Right, Rebel Proud	Hank Williams III	Bruc	October 21	
4	Do You Believe Me Now	Jimmy Wayne	Valory Music Group	August 26	
1	Do You Know	Jessica Simpson	Epic/Columbia Nashville	September 9	
1	Fearless	Taylor Swift	Big Machine	November 11	
2	The Foundation	Zac Brown Band	Atlantic/Home Grown/Big Picture	November 18	
7	Goin' All Out	Dan Evans	Edje-Executive	October 7	
1	Good Time	Alan Jackson	Arista Nashville	March 4	
1	Greatest Hits 3	Tim McGraw	Curb	October 7	
2	Greatest Hits/ Every Mile a Memory 2003–2008	Dierks Bentley	Capitol Nashville	May 6	
1	Greatest Hits: Limited Edition	Tim McGraw	Curb	April 29	
2	Greatest Hits Volume 1	Rascal Flatts	Lyric Street	October 28	
5	Holler Back	The Lost Trailers	BNA	August 26	
5	Jet Black & Jealous	Eli Young Band	Universal South	September 16	
1	Julianne Hough	Julianne Hough	Mercury Nashville	May 20	
2	Joy to the World	Faith Hill	Warner Bros. Nashville	September 30	
1	Kellie Pickler	Kellie Pickler	BNA	September 30	
1	Lady Antebellum	Lady Antebellum	Capitol Nashville	April 15	
1	Learn to Live	Darius Rucker	Capitol Nashville	September 16	
10	The Life of a Song	Joey & Rory	Vanguard/Sugar Hill	October 28	
2	Little Bit of Everything	Billy Currington	Mercury Nashville	October 14	
1	Love on the Inside	Sugarland	Mercury Nashville	July 22	
1	Lucky Old Sun	Kenny Chesney	Blue Chair/BNA	October 14	
8	Moment of Forever	Willie Nelson	Lost Highway	January 29	
1	My Life's Been a Country Song	Chris Cagle	Capitol Nashville	February 19	
1	Now That's What I Call Country	Various Artists	UMG/Sony BMG/Capitol	August 26	
1	Perfectly Clear	Jewel	Valory Music Group	June 3	
8	Phil Stacey	Phil Stacey	Lyric Street	April 29	
1	Play	Brad Paisley	Arista Nashville	November 4	
3	Prayer of a Common Man	Phil Vassar	Universal South	April 22	
3	Randy Rogers Band	Randy Rogers Band	Mercury Nashville	September 23	
2	Sounds of the Season: The Julianne Hough Holiday Collection	Julianne Hough	Mercury Nashville	October 12	
7	Startin' Fires	Blake Shelton	Warner Bros. Nashville	November 18	
7	Starting Now	Chuck Wicks	RCA Nashville	January 22	
2	Sunset Man	James Otto	Raybaw/Warner Bros.	April 8	
7	Tennessee Pusher	Old Crow Medicine Show	Nettwerk	September 23	
1	That Don't Make Me a Bad Guy	Toby Keith	Show Dog	October 28	
6	That Lonesome Song	Jamey Johnson	Mercury Nashville	August 5	
8	That's Why	Craig Morgan	BNA	October 21	
1	Troubadour	George Strait	MCA Nashville	April 1	
4	We Weren't Crazy	Josh Gracin	Lyric Street	April 1	
2	What Am I Waiting For	Heidi Newfield	Curb	August 5	
8	Why Wait	Kristy Lee Cook	Arista Nashville	September 16	
7	X	Trace Adkins	Capitol Nashville	November 25	

=== Other top albums ===
US	Album	Artist	Record label	Release date	Reference
41	50 Greatest Hits	Reba McEntire	MCA Nashville	October 28	
50	America	Johnny Cash	Legacy	October 28	
28	Angels & Outlaws	Aaron Watson	Thirty Tigers	April 1	
35	Anne Murray's Christmas Album	Anne Murray	Manhattan/EMI	October 7	
21	Anything Goes	Randy Houser	Universal South	November 18	
17	Beer for My Horses (soundtrack)	Various Artists	Show Dog	August 12	
47	The Best of The Johnny Cash TV Show	Johnny Cash	Sony BMG	January 8	
27	Blake Shelton: Collector's Edition	Blake Shelton	Warner Bros. Nashville	February 26	
50	Blood, Sweat, and Steel	The Road Hammers	Montage	June 24	
33	Broken In	Trent Willmon	Compadre	February 26	
22	Bulletproof	Reckless Kelly	Yep Roc	June 24	
15	Burn Your Playhouse Down	George Jones	Bandit	August 19	
48	Cherryholmes III: Don't Believe	The Cherryholmes	Skaggs Family	September 30	
16	Classic Christmas	George Strait	MCA Nashville	October 7	
26	Classic Chris LeDoux	Chris LeDoux	Capitol Nashville	April 29	
30	Comal County Blue	Jason Boland & the Stragglers	Thirty Tigers	August 26	
30	Come Darkness, Come Light: Twelve Songs of Christmas	Mary Chapin Carpenter	Zoe	September 30	
26	Country Bluegrass Homecoming Volume One	Bill Gaither	Gaither	August 19	
32	Country Bluegrass Homecoming Volume Two	Bill Gaither	Gaither	August 19	
44	Country Love Songs	Various Artists	Compass/BMG	November 11	
15	Country Sings Disney	Various Artists	Walt Disney	July 8	
16	Dawn of a New Day	Crystal Shawanda	RCA Nashville	August 19	
42	God Bless the USA	Various Artists	Word	April 29	
35	Good Thing Going	Rhonda Vincent	Rounder	January 8	
16	Greatest Hits	Craig Morgan	Broken Bow	September 30	
37	Heart of Stone	Chris Knight	Drifter's Church	September 2	
39	Here It Is	Roger Creager	Thirty Tigers	August 26	
18	How Great Thou Art: Gospel Favorites from the Grand Ole Opry	Various Artists	RCA Nashville	February 5	
29	Honoring the Fathers of Bluegrass: Tribute to 1946 and 1947	Ricky Skaggs	Skaggs Family	March 25	
11	The Imus Ranch Record	Various Artists	New West	September 16	
19	I Turn to You	Richie McDonald	Lucid	June 3	
36	I Will Always Love You: 17 Inspirational Songs	Various Artists	Word	January 15	
29	If We Ever Make It Home	Wade Bowen	Sustain	September 30	
32	Jeff Bates	Jeff Bates	Black River	April 8	
43	Keep on Walkin'	The Grascals	Rounder	July 15	
38	Limited Edition: Greatest Hits Volumes 1, 2 & 3	Tim McGraw	Curb	October 7	
19	Live in Concert	Martina McBride	RCA Nashville	April 29	
35	Love Songs	Trisha Yearwood	MCA Nashville	January 15	
27	Meet Glen Campbell	Glen Campbell	Capitol Nashville	August 19	
40	More Greatest Fits	Roy D. Mercer	Capitol Nashville	June 10	
43	Naïve	Micky & the Motorcars	Smith	July 29	
46	One Hell of a Ride	Willie Nelson	Lost Highway	April 1	
14	One on One	Randy Owen	Broken Bow	November 4	
27	Patriotic Country 3	Various Artists	Razor & Tie	June 24	
48	Playlist: The Very Best of Brooks & Dunn	Brooks & Dunn	Sony BMG	December 2	
39	Playlist: The Very Best of John Denver	John Denver	Sony BMG	April 29	
37	Playlist: The Very Best of Johnny Cash	Johnny Cash	Sony BMG	April 29	
50	Playlist: The Very Best of Roy Orbison	Roy Orbison	Sony BMG	April 29	
24	Ride Through the Country	Colt Ford	Average Joe's	December 2	
35	Rollin' with the Flow	Mark Chesnutt	Lofton Creek	June 24	
38	Sex and Gasoline	Rodney Crowell	Yep Roc	September 2	
13	Sleepless Nights	Patty Loveless	Saguaro Road	September 9	
16	Sounds So Good	Ashton Shepherd	MCA Nashville	March 4	
35	Time Flies	John Michael Montgomery	Stringtown	October 14	
41	'Tis the Season: A Country Christmas – 15 Christmas Classics	Various Artists			
42	The Unreleased Recordings	Hank Williams	Time Life	October 28	
49	The Unreleased Recordings	Hank Williams	Time Life	October 28	
45	Vagrants & Kings	Cory Morrow	Sustain	May 20	
11	Vintage Country: The Golden Age of Country Music	Various Artists	Sony BMG	March 25	
28	Waylon Forever	Waylon Jennings	Vagrant	October 21	
32	Wheels	Dan Tyminski	Rounder	June 17	

== Deaths ==
- January 6 – Ken Nelson, 96, record producer for artists including Hank Thompson, Buck Owens, Merle Haggard and many others.
- April 22 – Paul Davis, 60, crossover artist whose collaborations with Marie Osmond and Tanya Tucker reached No. 1 in the 1980s. (heart attack)
- May 1 – Jim Hager, 66, country singer and actor who along with his twin brother Jon were regulars on Hee Haw from 1969 to 1986. (heart attack)
- May 5 – Jerry Wallace, 79, crossover artist who scored several country hits during the 1970s including the No. 1 "If You Leave Me Tonight I'll Cry" in 1972. (congestive heart failure)
- May 8 – Eddy Arnold, 89, country and pop singer whose career spanned seven decades. (natural causes)
- May 11 – Dottie Rambo, 74, southern gospel singer-songwriter. (bus accident)
- July 16 – Jo Stafford, 90, crossover artist from the 1940s with hits "Feudin’ and Fightin" and "Temptation". (congestive heart failure)
- August 11 – Don Helms, 81, steel guitarist and member of Hank Williams' Drifting Cowboys. (heart attack)
- September 1 – Jerry Reed, 71, country singer and actor best known for his 1971 crossover hit "When You're Hot, You're Hot" (emphysema)
- September 12 – Charlie Walker, 81, honky tonk singer best known for "Pick Me Up On Your Way Down" (colon cancer)
- December 24 – Alf Robertson, 67, Swedish country musician.

== Hall of Fame inductees ==
=== Bluegrass Music Hall of Fame inductees ===
- Bill Clifton
- Charles Wolfe

=== Country Music Hall of Fame inductees ===
- Tom T. Hall (1936-2021), singer and songwriter, known as "The Storyteller"
- Emmylou Harris (born 1947), neo-traditional singer and songwriter
- The Statler Brothers (Harold Reid (1939–2020), Don Reid (born 1945), Phil Balsley (born 1939), Lew DeWitt (1938–1990), Jimmy Fortune (born 1955)), diverse country music group known for pop-styled, nostalgic and gospel songs.
- Ernest "Pop" Stoneman (1893–1968), singer, songwriter, and musician, patriarch of the family group The Stonemans

=== Canadian Country Music Hall of Fame inductees ===
- Prairie Oyster
- Brian Ferriman
- Wes Montgomery

== Major awards ==
=== Grammy Awards ===
(presented February 8, 2009 in Los Angeles)

- Best Female Country Vocal Performance – "Last Name", Carrie Underwood
- Best Male Country Vocal Performance – "Letter to Me", Brad Paisley
- Best Country Performance by a Duo or Group with Vocals – "Stay", Sugarland
- Best Country Collaboration with Vocals – "Killing the Blues", Robert Plant and Alison Krauss
- Best Country Instrumental Performance – "Cluster Pluck", Brad Paisley, James Burton, Vince Gill, John Jorgenson, Albert Lee, Brent Mason, Redd Volkaert, and Steve Wariner
- Best Country Song – "Stay", Jennifer Nettles
- Best Country Album – Troubadour, George Strait
- Best Bluegrass Album – Honoring the Fathers of Bluegrass: Tribute to 1946 and 1947, Ricky Skaggs and Kentucky Thunder

=== Juno Awards ===
(presented March 29, 2009 in Vancouver)

- Country Recording of the Year – Beautiful Life, Doc Walker

=== CMT Music Awards ===
(presented April 14 in Nashville)

- Video of the Year – "Our Song", Taylor Swift
- Male Video of the Year – "I Got My Game On", Trace Adkins
- Female Video of the Year – "Our Song", Taylor Swift
- Group Video of the Year – "Take Me There", Rascal Flatts
- Duo Video of the Year – "Stay", Sugarland
- USA Weekend Breakthrough Video of the Year – "I Wonder", Kellie Pickler
- Collaborative Video of the Year – "Till We Ain't Strangers Anymore", Bon Jovi & LeAnn Rimes
- Performance of the Year – "I Wonder", Kellie Pickler
- Supporting Character of the Year – Rodney Carrington in "I Got My Game On"
- Wide Open Country Video of the Year – "Gone Gone Gone (Done Moved On)", Alison Krauss & Robert Plant
- Tearjerker Video of the Year – "I Wonder", Kellie Pickler
- Comedy Video of the Year – "Online", Brad Paisley
- Video Director of the Year – Michael Salomon

=== Academy of Country Music ===
(presented April 5, 2009 in Las Vegas)

- Entertainer of the Year – Carrie Underwood
- Top Male Vocalist – Brad Paisley
- Top Female Vocalist – Carrie Underwood
- Top Vocal Group – Rascal Flatts
- Top Vocal Duo – Sugarland
- Top New Male Vocalist – Jake Owen
- Top New Female Vocalist – Julianne Hough
- Top New Vocal Duo or Group – Zac Brown Band
- Top New Artist – Julianne Hough
- Album of the Year – Fearless, Taylor Swift
- Single Record of the Year – "You're Gonna Miss This", Trace Adkins
- Song of the Year – "In Color", Jamey Johnson
- Video of the Year – "Waitin' on a Woman", Brad Paisley
- Vocal Event of the Year – "Start a Band", Brad Paisley and Keith Urban
- Poets Award – Merle Haggard and Harlan Howard
- Jim Reeves International Award – Dolly Parton
- Cliffie Stone Pioneer Award – Hank Williams, Jr., Kenny Rogers, Randy Travis and Jerry Reed
- Tex Ritter Award – Beer for My Horses

=== Americana Music Honors & Awards ===
- Album of the Year – Raising Sand (Robert Plant and Alison Krauss)
- Artist of the Year – Levon Helm
- Duo/Group of the Year – Robert Plant and Alison Krauss
- Song of the Year – "She Left Me For Jesus" (Brian Keane and Hayes Carll
- Emerging Artist of the Year – Mike Farris
- Instrumentalist of the Year – Buddy Miller
- Spirit of Americana/Free Speech Award – Joan Baez
- Lifetime Achievement: Trailblazer – Nanci Griffith
- Lifetime Achievement: Songwriting – John Haitt
- Lifetime Achievement: Performance – Jason & the Scorchers
- Lifetime Achievement: Instrumentalist – Larry Campbell
- Lifetime Achievement: Executive – Terry Licknola
- Lifetime Achievement: Producer/Engineer – Tony Brown

=== ARIA Awards ===
(presented in Sydney on October 19, 2008)

- Best Country Album – Rattlin' Bones (Kasey Chambers and Shane Nicholson)

=== Canadian Country Music Association ===
(presented September 8 in Winnipeg)

- Fans' Choice Award – Doc Walker
- Male Artist of the Year – Johnny Reid
- Female Artist of the Year – Jessie Farrell
- Group or Duo of the Year – Doc Walker
- Songwriter(s) of the Year – "Beautiful Life", written by Murray Pulver, Chris Thorsteinson and Dave Wasyliw
- Single of the Year – "Beautiful Life", performed by Doc Walker
- Album of the Year – Beautiful Life, Doc Walker
- Top Selling Album – The Ultimate Hits, Garth Brooks
- Top Selling Canadian Album – Kicking Stones, Johnny Reid
- CMT Video of the Year – "Beautiful Life", Doc Walker
- Rising Star Award – Jessie Farrell
- Roots Artist or Group of the Year – Corb Lund

=== Country Music Association ===
(presented November 12 in Nashville)

- Entertainer of the Year – Kenny Chesney
- Female Vocalist of the Year – Carrie Underwood
- Male Vocalist of the Year – Brad Paisley
- New Artist of the Year – Lady Antebellum
- Vocal Group of the Year – Rascal Flatts
- Vocal Duo of the Year – Sugarland
- Single of the Year – "I Saw God Today", George Strait
- Album of the Year – Troubadour, George Strait
- Song of the Year – "Stay", Sugarland
- Musical Event of the Year – "Gone, Gone, Gone (Done Moved On)", Robert Plant and Alison Krauss
- Music Video of the Year – "Waitin' on a Woman", Brad Paisley and Andy Griffith
- Musician of the Year – Mac McAnally

=== Hollywood Walk of Fame ===
Stars who were honored in 2008:

- Brooks & Dunn

=== Kennedy Center Honors ===
Country stars who were honored in 2008:

- George Jones

== See also ==
- Country Music Association
- Inductees of the Country Music Hall of Fame

== Bibliography ==
- Whitburn, Joel, Top Country Songs 1944–2005, 6th Edition. 2005, ISBN 9780898201659
