= Greatest Hits 3 (Tim McGraw album) =

Greatest hits album by Tim McGraw
- Released: October 7, 2008
- Genre: Country
- Length: 46:47
- Label: Curb
- Producers: Byron Gallimore; Denny Hemingson; Tim McGraw; Roman McHugh; Darran Smith; James Stroud

Tim McGraw chronology
Greatest Hits: Limited Edition (2008)	Greatest Hits 3 (2008)	Southern Voice (2009)

Professional ratings
Review scores
Source	Rating
AllMusic	2.5/5 stars

Greatest Hits 3 is the third compilation album by American country music singer Tim McGraw. The album was released on October 7, 2008.

The official announcement of the album was made on August 28, 2008, on McGraw's official website.

No new material was recorded for Greatest Hits 3. However, the album does include two songs not previously released on any of McGraw's albums: "Find Out Who Your Friends Are" (a number one collaboration with Tracy Lawrence and Kenny Chesney, also featured on Lawrence's 2007 album For the Love) and "Nine Lives", a collaboration with Def Leppard. The album also features a live version of "Real Good Man" (2003).

On October 14, 2008, McGraw issued a statement regarding his disappointment with his record label's decision to release the compilation instead of a new studio record. McGraw stated: "It has to be just as confusing to the fans as it is to me. I had no involvement in the creation or presentation of this record." He then stated: "In the spirit of an election year, I would simply say to my fans, I'm Tim McGraw, and I don't approve their message."

== Track listing ==
No.	Title	Writer(s)	Length
1.	"Back When" (radio edit)	Jeff Stevens, Stan Lynch, Stephony Smith	4:29
2.	"Last Dollar (Fly Away)" (radio edit)	Big Kenny	3:56
3.	"If You're Reading This" (Live from the 2007 Academy of Country Music Awards)	Tim McGraw, Brad Warren, Brett Warren	4:05
4.	"Do You Want Fries with That"	Casey Beathard, Kerry Kurt Phillips	3:57
5.	"Unbroken"	Annie Roboff, Holly Lamar	4:00
6.	"Can't Be Really Gone"	Gary Burr	3:20
7.	"Angry All the Time"	Bruce Robison	4:30
8.	"Suspicions" (radio edit)	David Malloy, Eddie Rabbitt, Even Stevens, Randy McCormick	4:13
9.	"Find Out Who Your Friends Are" (with Tracy Lawrence)	Beathard, Ed Hill	3:46
10.	"Let It Go"	Aimee Mayo, Bill Luther, Tom Douglas	3:43
11.	"Real Good Man" (live recording, 2003)	Rivers Rutherford, George Teren	4:16
12.	"Nine Lives" (with Def Leppard from Songs from the Sparkle Lounge)	Phil Collen, Rick Savage, Joe Elliott, McGraw	3:32

== Charts ==
=== Weekly charts ===
Chart (2008)	Peak position
US Billboard 200	9
US Top Country Albums (Billboard)	1

=== Year-end charts ===
Chart (2008)	Position
US Top Country Albums (Billboard)	72
Chart (2009)	Position
US Top Country Albums (Billboard)	49

== Certifications ==
Region	Certification	Certified units/sales
United States (RIAA)	Gold	500,000^{^}
^{^} Shipments figures based on certification alone.
