= Tim McGraw (disambiguation) =

Tim McGraw (born 1967) is an American singer and actor.

Tim McGraw may also refer to:

- Tim McGraw (album), the singer's first album
- "Tim McGraw" (song), a song recorded by Taylor Swift
