= Greatest Hits: Limited Edition (Tim McGraw album) =

Greatest hits album by Tim McGraw
- Released: April 29, 2008
- Genre: Country
- Length: 2:03:58
- Label: Curb
- Producers: Byron Gallimore; Tim McGraw; The Neptunes; Darran Smith; James Stroud

Tim McGraw chronology
Let It Go (2007)	Greatest Hits: Limited Edition (2008)	Greatest Hits 3 (2008)

Professional ratings
Review scores
Source	Rating
Allmusic	4/5 stars

Greatest Hits: Limited Edition is a compilation of American country music artist Tim McGraw's first two greatest hits albums. Initially sold exclusively at Wal-Mart, it was released on April 29, 2008, and entered Billboard's Top Country Albums chart at #1, selling 29,000 copies in its first week of release. The album was made available at other retailers on August 26, 2008.

== Track listing ==
Disc 1
No.	Title	Writer(s)	Length
1.	"Indian Outlaw"	John D. Loudermilk, Jumpin' Gene Simmons, Tommy Barnes	3:01
2.	"Don't Take the Girl"	Craig Martin, Larry W. Johnson	4:09
3.	"She Never Lets It Go to Her Heart"	Chris Waters, Tom Shapiro	3:02
4.	"I Like It, I Love It"	Markus Hall, Jeb Stuart Anderson, Steve Dukes	3:24
5.	"Just to See You Smile"	Mark Nesler, Tony Martin	3:34
6.	"It's Your Love" (duet Faith Hill)	Stephony Smith	3:45
7.	"Where the Green Grass Grows"	Jess Leary, Craig Wiseman	3:22
8.	"For a Little While"	Steve Mandile, Jerry Vandiver, Phil Vassar	3:33
9.	"Please Remember Me"	Rodney Crowell, Will Jennings	4:55
10.	"Something Like That"	Rick Ferrell, Keith Follesé	3:03
11.	"My Best Friend"	Bill Luther, Aimee Mayo	4:39
12.	"Maybe We Should Just Sleep on It"	Jerry Laseter, Kerry Kurt Phillips	3:55
13.	"Down on the Farm"	Laseter, Phillips	2:55
14.	"My Next Thirty Years"	Vassar	3:37
15.	"Let's Make Love" (duet with Faith Hill)	Chris Lindsey, Marv Green, Luther, Mayo	4:11

Disc 2
No.	Title	Writer(s)	Length
1.	"Live Like You Were Dying"	Tim Nichols, Wiseman	5:00
2.	"My Old Friend"	Wiseman, Steve McEwan	3:38
3.	"Like We Never Loved at All" (duet with Faith Hill)	John Rich, Vicky McGehee, Scot Sax	4:17
4.	"The Cowboy in Me"	Al Anderson, Wiseman, Jeffrey Steele	4:03
5.	"When the Stars Go Blue"	Ryan Adams	3:55
6.	"Real Good Man"	Rivers Rutherford, George Teren	4:16
7.	"She's My Kind of Rain"	Tommy Lee James, Robin Lerner	4:17
8.	"Grown Men Don't Cry"	Tom Douglas, Steve Seskin	3:56
9.	"Not a Moment Too Soon"	Joe Barnhill, Wayne Perry	3:48
10.	"Watch the Wind Blow By"	Anders Osborne, Dylan Altman	4:37
11.	"Over And Over" (duet with Nelly)	Tim McGraw, Nelly, Jason Bridges, James D. "Sted Fast" Hargroves II	4:16
12.	"Everywhere"	Mike Reid, Wiseman	4:51
13.	"Beautiful People"	Wiseman, Lindsey	4:59
14.	"Red Ragtop"	Jason White	4:44
15.	"My Little Girl"	McGraw, Douglas	3:39
16.	"I've Got Friends That Do"	McGraw, Brett Beavers, Brad Warren, Brett Warren	4:13

== Charts ==
=== Weekly charts ===
Chart (2008)	Peak position
Australian Albums (ARIA)	19
US Billboard 200	10
US Top Country Albums (Billboard)	1

=== Year-end charts ===
Chart (2008)	Position
US Billboard 200	181
US Top Country Albums (Billboard)	28
Chart (2009)	Position
US Top Country Albums (Billboard)	40
