= I Need You (Tim McGraw and Faith Hill song) =

Single by Tim McGraw and Faith Hill

from the album Let It Go
- Released: April 23, 2007
- Studio: Blackbird Studio (Nashville, TN)
- Genre: Country
- Length: 4:08
- Label: Curb
- Songwriters: David Lee; Tony Lane
- Producers: Byron Gallimore; Tim McGraw; Darran Smith

Tim McGraw singles chronology
| "Last Dollar (Fly Away)" (2007) | "I Need You" (2007) | "If You're Reading This" (2007) |

Faith Hill singles chronology
| "Stealing Kisses" (2006) | "I Need You" (2007) | "Lost" (2007) |

"I Need You" is a song written by David Lee and Tony Lane, and recorded by American country music artist Tim McGraw and his wife, Faith Hill as a duet. It was released in April 2007 as the second single from the album, Let It Go. The song peaked at number 8 on the country charts in August 2007, partly due to competition with individual singles from Hill and McGraw ("Lost" and "If You're Reading This", respectively).

The duet was nominated twice at the 2008 Grammy Awards for Best Country Collaboration with Vocals and Best Country Song.

== Content ==
The song is a ballad, in which the two lovers describe what their love means to each other. They both state their need for each other.

== Critical reception ==
Ken Tucker, of Billboard magazine in his review of the album, called the song "wonderfully different than the power ballads they usually do."

== Music video ==
The music video, which features an acoustic version of this song, was directed and produced by Sherman Halsey, and premiered on CMT on June 12, 2007.

== Chart positions ==
"I Need You" debuted at number 48 on the U.S. Billboard Hot Country Songs for the week of April 14, 2007, the same week that McGraw's previous single "Last Dollar (Fly Away)" reached number one.

| Chart (2007) | Peak position |
|---|---|
| US Hot Country Songs (Billboard) | 8 |
| US Billboard Hot 100 | 50 |
| US Billboard Pop 100 | 64 |
| Canada Country (Billboard) | 4 |
| Canada Hot 100 (Billboard) | 75 |

=== Year-end charts ===
| Chart (2007) | Position |
|---|---|
| US Country Songs (Billboard) | 45 |

== Certifications ==
| Region | Certification | Certified units/sales |
|---|---|---|
| United States (RIAA) | Platinum | 1,000,000^{‡} |
^{‡} Sales+streaming figures based on certification alone.

== Cover versions ==
Country music duo Steel Magnolia recorded a live version of the song, which is included in their 2010 extended play, Steel Magnolia — EP.
