= Kristofferson (song) =

Single by Tim McGraw

from the album Let It Go
- Released: March 17, 2008
- Genre: Country
- Length: 3:23
- Label: Curb
- Songwriters: Anthony Smith; Reed Nielsen
- Producers: Byron Gallimore; Tim McGraw; Darran Smith

Tim McGraw singles chronology
"Suspicions" (2007)	"Kristofferson" (2008)	"Nine Lives" (2008)

"Kristofferson" is a song written by Anthony Smith and Reed Nielsen, and recorded by American country music singer Tim McGraw. It was released in March 2008 as the fifth single from his album Let It Go. The song peaked at number 16 on the country singles charts.

== Content ==
A mid-tempo ballad accompanied by piano and fiddle, "Kristofferson" centralizes on a character (the narrator) who has just returned home only to discover that his significant other has departed, leaving only a note which fills up half a sheet of paper. Upon seeing the note, the narrator takes a pencil and begins to write down his feelings (in lyrical form) in the remaining space, using his composition as an allusion to songwriter Kris Kristofferson.

== Critical reception ==
Brady Vercher of Engine 145 gave the song a thumbs-down review. He said that the song seemed like an attempt to capitalize on Kristofferson's fame, and did not expand on the title beyond name-checking. However, Vercher said that the production was pleasant and that McGraw sang the song well.

== Chart performance ==
The song debuted at number 53 on the Hot Country Songs chart dated March 15, 2008.

Chart (2008)	Peak position
Canada Country (Billboard)	19
US Hot Country Songs (Billboard)	16
US Bubbling Under Hot 100 (Billboard)	10
