= How Great Thou Art: Gospel Favorites from the Grand Ole Opry =

Live album by Various Artists
- Released: February 5, 2008
- Recorded: January 20, 2008
- Genre: Gospel; country; country pop
- Length: 52:11
- Label: RCA
- Producer: Steve Gibson

Professional ratings
Review scores
Source	Rating
AllMusic	3.5/5 stars

How Great Thou Art: Gospel Favorites from the Grand Ole Opry is a live album of the Grand Ole Opry special of the same name, and features Alan Jackson, Loretta Lynn and Brad Paisley among others.

== Track listing ==
1. "I'll Fly Away" – Charlie Daniels Band
2. "Blessed Assurance" – Alan Jackson
3. "Precious Memories" – Patty Loveless
4. "Precious Lord, Take My Hand" – Ronnie Milsap
5. "Family Bible" – Ricky Skaggs
6. "Just a Closer Walk With Thee" – Sara Evans
7. "The Old Rugged Cross" – Brad Paisley
8. "The Wayfaring Stranger" – Trace Adkins
9. "Where No One Stands Alone" – Loretta Lynn
10. "Give Me Jesus" – Vince Gill
11. "A House of Gold" – Dierks Bentley
12. "How Great Thou Art" – Carrie Underwood

== Charts ==
Chart (2008)	Peak position
U.S. Billboard Top Christian Albums	5
U.S. Billboard Top Country Albums	18
U.S. Billboard 200	131
