= Nothin' to Die For =

Single by Tim McGraw

from the album Let It Go
- Released: January 5, 2009
- Recorded: 2006–07
- Genre: Country
- Length: 4:13
- Label: Curb
- Songwriters: Lee Thomas Miller; Craig Wiseman
- Producers: Byron Gallimore; Tim McGraw; Darran Smith

Tim McGraw singles chronology
"Let It Go" (2008)	"Nothin' to Die For" (2009)	"It's a Business Doing Pleasure with You" (2009)

"Nothin' to Die For" is a song written by Lee Thomas Miller and Craig Wiseman, and recorded by American country music artist Tim McGraw. It was released in January 2009 as the seventh and final single from his album Let It Go. It is McGraw's fifty-first chart entry on the Billboard country charts. It peaked at number 5 in the United States, and number 3 in Canada in April 2009.

== Content ==
"Nothin' to Die For" is a mid-tempo song accompanied by electric guitar and synthesizer strings. In it, the narrator tries to convince a friend not to drink alcohol and not dare drive. In the first verse, he expresses the danger of drunk driving, and in the chorus, he tells the friend that although he can put his life at risk for his family and friends, that he should not risk his life with alcohol.

In the second verse, it is revealed that the friend is drinking heavily because of his workaholic nature ("The money you make ain't worth the time you spend to make your pay").

== Critical reception ==
Jim Malec of The 9513 gave the song a "thumbs down" rating. His review mainly criticizes the lyric, calling it a "four minute-long public service announcement", also saying that the lyrics were oversimplified and "discuss[ed] alcoholism in the most easily consumable, unobjectionable fashion possible." Blake Boldt of Country Universe gave the song a B− rating. He considered the song well-sung and "carefully constructed," but criticized it for not "reach[ing] the real heart of this sad tale."

== Chart positions ==
Chart (2009)	Peak position
US Hot Country Songs (Billboard)	5
US Billboard Hot 100	68
Canada Country (Billboard)	3
Canada Hot 100 (Billboard)	76

=== Year-end charts ===
Chart (2009)	Position
US Country Songs (Billboard)	42
