= Let It Go (Tim McGraw album) =

Studio album by Tim McGraw
- Released: March 27, 2007
- Studios: Essential Sound (Houston, Texas); Ocean Way (Nashville, Tennessee
- Genre: Country
- Length: 52:39
- Label: Curb
- Producers: Byron Gallimore; Tim McGraw; Darran Smith

Tim McGraw chronology
Tim McGraw Reflected: Greatest Hits Vol. 2 (2006)	Let It Go (2007)	Greatest Hits: Limited Edition (2008)

Singles from Let It Go
- 1. "Last Dollar (Fly Away)" Released: January 8, 2007; 2. "I Need You" Released: April 23, 2007; 3. "If You're Reading This" Released: June 11, 2007; 4. "Suspicions" Released: November 26, 2007; 5. "Kristofferson" Released: March 17, 2008; 6. "Let It Go" Released: July 21, 2008; 7. "Nothin' to Die For" Released: January 5, 2009; 8. "Whiskey and You" Released: February 13, 2010

Professional ratings
Aggregate scores
Source	Rating
Metacritic	(73/100)
Review scores
Source	Rating
USA Today	3.5/5 stars
Allmusic	4/5 stars
The Boston Globe	(positive)
Chicago Sun Times	3/5 stars
Entertainment Weekly	B−
Los Angeles Times	2.5/4 stars
People	3/4 stars
PopMatters	8/10 stars
Robert Christgau	(choice cut)
Orlando Sentinel	3/5 stars
Associated Press	(A−)

Let It Go is the ninth studio album by American country music artist Tim McGraw. It was released on March 27, 2007, by Curb Records. It entered the U.S. Billboard 200 at number one with sales of 325,000 copies. The album has produced seven Top 20 singles on the Billboard Hot Country Songs charts, including a number one; one of those seven songs was only included on later issues of the album. Of all McGraw's albums, this one has produced the most singles in his career.

== Content ==
The first single from the album, "Last Dollar (Fly Away)" (written by Big Kenny of Big & Rich), reached the top of the country charts in early 2007, giving McGraw his first number one hit since "Back When" in late 2004. Following it was "I Need You", a duet with his wife Faith Hill. This song peaked at #8. Shortly after the latter was released, McGraw charted with a live rendition of the song "If You're Reading This". He performed that song live at the Academy of Country Music awards in May 2007. A month after this song entered the charts, the album was re-issued with "If You're Reading This" added to the track listing. Afterwards, that song was later officially issued as the album's third single and reached #3 on the country charts.

"If You're Reading This" was followed in late 2007 by "Suspicions", a cover of Eddie Rabbitt's number one hit from 1979. However, McGraw's version became the second Top 40 hit of all his career to miss the Top 10 by peaking at #12 on Hot Country Songs. Following that song were "Kristofferson" and the title track in 2008; the former also failed to make the Top Ten by at #16 while the latter went to #2 in early December. The seventh single, "Nothin' to Die For", was released in January 2009. It entered the Hot Country Songs chart as an album cut at #57 in late December before its official release that month.

The song "Shotgun Rider" is not to be confused with another song with the same name which McGraw recorded on his 2014 album, Sundown Heaven Town. This song, written by Marv Green, Hillary Lindsey and Troy Verges, was released by McGraw as the latter album's third single in 2014, and became a number one song for him that year.

The track "Whiskey and You" was later recorded by its co-writer Chris Stapleton on his 2015 debut album Traveller.

== Track listing ==
No.	Title	Writer(s)	Length
1.	"Last Dollar (Fly Away)"	Big Kenny	4:30
2.	"I'm Workin'"	Darrell Scott; Lori McKenna	3:40
3.	"Let It Go"	Aimee Mayo; Bill Luther; Tom Douglas	3:45
4.	"Whiskey and You"	Chris Stapleton; Lee Thomas Miller	3:47
5.	"Suspicions"	David Malloy; Eddie Rabbitt; Even Stevens; Randy McCormick	5:16
6.	"Kristofferson"	Anthony Smith; Reed Nielsen	3:23
7.	"Put Your Lovin' on Me"	Hillary Lindsey; Luke Laird	3:34
8.	"Nothin' to Die For"	Miller; Craig Wiseman	4:13
9.	"Between the River and Me"	Brad Warren; Brett Warren; Brett Beavers	3:53
10.	"Train #10"	Tim McGraw; Brad Warren; Brett Warren	3:58
11.	"I Need You" (duet with Faith Hill)	David Lee; Tony Lane	4:08
12.	"Comin' Home"	Rivers Rutherford; Steve McEwan	4:06
13.	"Shotgun Rider" (featuring Faith Hill)	Smith; Jeffrey Steele; Sherrié Austin	4:21
14.	"If You're Reading This" (Live recording from 2007 ACM awards, Only available on mid-2007 re-issues of album)	McGraw; Brad Warren; Brett Warren	4:12

== Personnel ==
Tim McGraw & the Dancehall Doctors

- Tim McGraw – lead vocals
- Deano Brown – fiddle, mandolin
- David Dunkley – percussion
- Denny Hemingson – electric guitar, steel guitar
- John Marcus – bass
- Billy Mason – drums
- Jeff McMahon – acoustic piano, Rhodes, Wurlitzer electric piano, synthesizers, Hammond B3 organ
- Bob Minner – acoustic guitar
- Darran Smith – electric guitar, additional acoustic guitar (13)

Additional Musician

- Byron Gallimore – synthesizers (8, 12), acoustic guitar (12)

Background Vocals

- Greg Barnhill (2–5, 7–10, 12)
- Wes Hightower (6)
- Faith Hill (13), lead vocals (11)
- Last Dollar Singers (1)
- Russell Terrell (1–5)

Production

- Adam Ayan – mastering at Gateway Mastering (Portland, Maine)
- David Bryant – assistant engineer (1–12)
- Ann Callis – production assistant
- Jesse Chrisman – additional recording, Pro Tools engineer, mix assistant
- Danny Clinch – other photography
- Tony Duran – cover photography, other photography
- Byron Gallimore – producer, mixing
- Missi Gallimore – A&R direction
- Jason Gantt – additional recording, Pro Tools engineer
- Bryan Graban – assistant engineer (3, 4, 7, 8, 12)
- Jed Hackett – additional recording, Pro Tools engineer
- Sara Lesher – additional recording, Pro Tools engineer, mix assistant
- Erik Lutkins – additional recording, Pro Tools engineer, mix assistant
- Tim McGraw – producer, mixing
- Darran Smith – producer
- Julian King – tracking engineer
- John Netti – assistant engineer (1, 2, 5, 6, 9–11)
- Lowell Reynolds – assistant engineer (1, 2, 5, 6, 9–11)
- David Robinson – assistant engineer (1, 2, 5, 6, 9–11)
- Todd Schall – assistant engineer (3, 4, 7, 8, 12)
- Heath Stimmel – additional recording
- Glenn Sweitzer – art direction, package design

== Chart performance ==
Let It Go entered the U.S. Billboard 200 and the Top Country Albums charts at #1. This became McGraw's fourth #1 Billboard 200 and eleventh #1 Top Country Albums release.

=== Weekly charts ===
Chart (2007)	Peak position
Australian Albums (ARIA)	49
Canadian Albums (Billboard)	1
US Billboard 200	1
US Top Country Albums (Billboard)	1

=== Year-end charts ===
Chart (2007)	Position
US Billboard 200	30
US Top Country Albums (Billboard)	6
Chart (2008)	Position
US Billboard 200	172
US Top Country Albums (Billboard)	26

== Sales and certifications ==
Region	Certification	Certified units/sales
Canada (Music Canada)	Gold	50,000^{^}
United States (RIAA)	Platinum	1,000,000^{^}
^{^} Shipments figures based on certification alone.

== Singles ==
Year	Single	Chart Positions		
Year	Single	US Country	US	CAN
2007	"Last Dollar (Fly Away)"	1	13	—
2007	"I Need You" (with Faith Hill)	8	50	75
2007	"If You're Reading This"	3	41	81
2007	"Suspicions"	12	87	—
2008	"Kristofferson"	16	110	—
2008	"Let It Go"	2	47	75
2009	"Nothin' to Die For"	5	68	76
