= If You're Reading This =

Single by Tim McGraw

from the album Let It Go
- Released: June 11, 2007
- Recorded: May 15, 2007 (live recording); June 2007 (remixed version)
- Genre: Country
- Length: 4:12
- Label: Curb
- Songwriters: Tim McGraw; Brad Warren; Brett Warren
- Producers: Byron Gallimore; Tim McGraw; Darran Smith

Tim McGraw singles chronology
"I Need You" (2007)	"If You're Reading This" (2007)	"Suspicions" (2007)

"If You're Reading This" is a song performed by American country music artist Tim McGraw. It was first performed at the Academy of Country Music (ACM) awards, which were held in Las Vegas, Nevada and aired May 15, 2007 on CBS. Shortly after McGraw's live performance, several radio stations began playing a telecast of the song, boosting it to a debut at No. 35 on the Billboard Hot Country Songs charts from unsolicited airplay. A remixed version of the live recording was later released to radio as a single, overlapping with McGraw's then-current single, "I Need You", a duet with his wife Faith Hill.

"If You're Reading This" eventually peaked at No. 3 on the Billboard country charts in October 2007, becoming McGraw's forty-second Top Ten country hit overall. The song also peaked at No. 41 on the Billboard Hot 100.

== About the song ==
"If You're Reading This" is a tribute to the families of soldiers who have died. Its lyrics take the form of a letter written from a soldier to his family — a letter that is intended to be sent only if the soldier dies ("If you're reading this / I'm already home").

McGraw co-wrote the song, with Brad and Brett Warren of country duo The Warren Brothers, approximately three weeks before the ACM awards aired. The three were inspired by reading a magazine article on war casualties.

When McGraw performed the song at the ACM telecast, one hundred relatives of soldiers joined him onstage, under a banner that read "Families of Fallen Heroes". After performing the song, he received a standing ovation.

== Chart performance ==
Despite the lack of a studio recording, the song received airplay on country radio after several stations began playing the CBS telecast of McGraw's live performance. As a result, it entered Billboard's Hot Country Songs chart at number 35. Scott Siman, McGraw's manager, had been working with both the label (Curb Records) and radio stations to "address the fact that we don't have a studio recorded version of this song". A remixed version (with most of the audience noise removed, except for applause at the end) was released to radio in June 2007, while McGraw's then-current single "I Need You" (a Faith Hill duet) was also climbing the charts. This remix was added to later presses of his then current album Let It Go, and Curb began promoting the song as a single in place of "I Need You".

"If You're Reading This" is the second song in McGraw's career that has charted due to a live performance. In 2001, "unknown fans" taped McGraw's performance of the song "Things Change" during the CMA awards, and posted the recording to Napster; as a result, several stations downloaded and played the live telecast of that song.

== Chart positions ==
Chart (2007)	Peak position
US Hot Country Songs (Billboard)	3
US Billboard Hot 100	41
US Billboard Pop 100	48
Canada Country (Billboard)	12
Canada Hot 100 (Billboard)	81

=== Year-end charts ===
Chart (2007)	Position
US Country Songs (Billboard)	8

== Certifications ==
Region	Certification	Certified units/sales
United States (RIAA)	Platinum	1,000,000^{‡}
^{‡} Sales+streaming figures based on certification alone.
