= Tim McGraw (album) =

Studio album by Tim McGraw
- Released: April 20, 1993
- Recorded: 1991–1993
- Studio: Sixteenth Avenue Sound, Eleven-Eleven Sound Studios. Mesa Recording Studios and Sound Stage Studios (Nashville).
- Genre: Country
- Length: 30:22
- Label: Curb
- Producer: Byron Gallimore; Doug Johnson; James Stroud

Tim McGraw chronology
Tim McGraw (1993)	Not a Moment Too Soon (1994)

Singles from Tim McGraw
- 1. "What Room Was the Holiday In" Released: March 29, 1991; 2. "Welcome to the Club" Released: September 1992; 3. "Memory Lane" Released: February 1993; 4. "Two Steppin' Mind" Released: July 1993

Tim McGraw is the debut album by American country music artist Tim McGraw. It was released on April 20, 1993, by Curb Records. It includes the singles "What Room Was the Holiday In", "Welcome to the Club", "Two Steppin' Mind", and "Memory Lane", none of which reached the Top 40 on the country charts. This is the only studio album of McGraw's career not to achieve a music recording sales certification or to enter the Top Country Albums charts.

== Content ==
The album's lead single, "What Room Was the Holiday In", was produced by Doug Johnson; the rest of the album was produced by Byron Gallimore (who has produced all of McGraw's subsequent work) and James Stroud.

The tracks "Memory Lane" and "Tears in the Rain" were co-written by Joe Diffie, the former had been recorded by Keith Palmer on his debut album, while Diffie recorded his own version of "Tears in the Rain" for his 1995 album Life's So Funny. "The Only Thing That I Have Left" had been recorded by George Strait on his 1982 Strait from the Heart album.

== Critical reception ==
Professional ratings
Review scores
Source	Rating
AllMusic	2.5/5 stars

Brian Mansfield and Thom Jurek of AllMusic said that the album was not memorable aside from three of its singles, but that it showed the "roots of [his] individuality".

== Track listing ==
No.	Title	Writer(s)	Length
1.	"Welcome to the Club"	André Pessis; Steve Seskin	2:54
2.	"Two Steppin' Mind"	Buddy Brock; John Northrup	3:01
3.	"The Only Thing That I Have Left"	Clay Blaker	3:23
4.	"You Can Take It With You (When You Go)"	Frank Dycus; Kerry Kurt Phillips	2:12
5.	"Ain't No Angels"	Brad Davis; Billy Montana	3:06
6.	"Memory Lane"	Joe Diffie; Lonnie Wilson	3:25
7.	"Tears in the Rain"	Diffie; Wilson; Wayne Perry	3:20
8.	"What She Left Behind"	Paul Nelson; Kenny Beard; Earl Clark	2:54
9.	"What Room Was the Holiday In"	Jim Vest; Arti Portilla; Joyce Shoaf	3:08
10.	"I Keep It Under My Hat"	Michael Higgins; Phillips; Kent Henderson	3:12
Total length:			30:22

== Personnel ==
Vocals

- Tim McGraw – lead vocals
- Curtis Wright – backing vocals
- Curtis Young – backing vocals

Musicians

- Larry Byrom – acoustic guitar
- Jimmy Carter – bass
- Mark Casstevens – acoustic guitar, electric guitar
- Glen Duncan – fiddle
- Sonny Garrish – dobro, steel guitar
- Rob Hajacos – fiddle
- Kirk "Jelly Roll" Johnson – harmonica
- James King – backing vocals
- Paul Leim – drums
- Chris Leuzinger – electric guitar
- Gary Prim – pianos, synthesizers
- Brent Rowan – electric guitar
- James Stroud – drums
- Glenn Worf – bass

Production

- Milan Bogdan – digital editing
- Byron Gallimore – producer (1–8, 10)
- David Hall – assistant engineer, mix assistant
- Image Management Group – management
- Doug Johnson – producer (9)
- Julian King – recording, additional recording, mix assistant
- Jim "Señor" McGuire – photography
- Glenn Meadows – mastering
- Neuman, Walker & Associates (Los Angeles, California) – art direction, design
- Lynn Peterzell – recording, mixing
- James Stroud – producer (1–8, 10)

Studios

- Masterfonics (Nashville, Tennessee) – editing and mastering location

== Chart performance ==
=== Singles ===
Year	Single	Peak positions
Year	Single	US Country
1991	"What Room Was the Holiday In"	—
1992	"Welcome to the Club"	47
1993	"Memory Lane"	60
1993	"Two Steppin' Mind"	71
"—" denotes releases that did not chart

== Release history ==
Tim McGraw release history
Region	Date	Format(s)	Label	Ref.
United States	April 20, 1993	CD; cassette	Curb	
