= Suspicions (song) =

1979 single by Eddie Rabbitt

Single by Eddie Rabbitt

from the album Loveline
- B-side: "I Don't Wanna Make Love (With Anyone Else but You)"
- Released: May 1979
- Recorded: 1979
- Genre: Country, R&B
- Length: 4:20
- Label: Elektra
- Songwriters: David Malloy; Randy McCormick; Eddie Rabbitt; Even Stevens
- Producer: David Malloy

Eddie Rabbitt singles chronology
"Every Which Way but Loose" (1979)	"Suspicions" (1979)	"Pour Me Another Tequila" (1979)

Music video
- "Suspicions" (1979 TV performance) on YouTube

"Suspicions" is a song originally recorded and released as a single in 1979 by Eddie Rabbitt from his album Loveline; his version was a number one hit on the Billboard country music chart and a top 20 hit on the Billboard Hot 100. The song saw renewed popularity in 2007–08, when Tim McGraw recorded and released a cover version on his album Let It Go.

== Background ==
"Suspicions" was the first single from Rabbitt's 1979 album Loveline. It reached number one on the Billboard Hot Country Singles chart in August. "Suspicions" also continued Rabbitt's rise as a crossover artist; peaking at number 13 on the Billboard Hot 100, it was his highest peak on the pop chart by that time. It was also a top 10 Adult Contemporary hit on the charts of both the U.S. and Canada.

Rabbitt said that he wrote the song "in five minutes in the studio during a lunch break".

"Suspicions" was named Broadcast Music Incorporated's Song of the Year a year later.

== Chart performance ==
=== Weekly charts ===
Chart (1979)	Peak position
Australia (Kent Music Report)	66
US Hot Country Songs (Billboard)	1
US Billboard Hot 100	13
US Adult Contemporary (Billboard)	9
US Cash Box Top 100	19
Canadian RPM Country Tracks	1
Canadian RPM Top Singles	41
Canadian RPM Adult Contemporary Tracks	7

=== Year-end charts ===
Chart (1979)	Position
US Billboard Hot 100	85
US Adult Contemporary (Billboard)	39
US Hot Country Songs (Billboard)	18

== Tim McGraw version ==
"Suspicions"

Single by Tim McGraw

from the album Let It Go
- Released: November 26, 2007
- Recorded: 2007
- Genre: Country
- Length: 5:17 (album version); 4:13 (radio edit)
- Label: Curb
- Songwriters: David Malloy; Randy McCormick; Eddie Rabbitt; Even Stevens
- Producers: Darran Smith; Tim McGraw; Byron Gallimore

Tim McGraw singles chronology
"If You're Reading This" (2007)	"Suspicions" (2007)	"Kristofferson" (2008)

In 2007, country music artist Tim McGraw recorded a cover of "Suspicions" for his album Let It Go. McGraw's cover of the song originally peaked at number 56 in early 2007 from unsolicited airplay shortly after the release of Let It Go. It was officially released on November 26, 2007, as the fourth single from the album (counting "If You're Reading This", only available on later presses). The single peaked at number 12 on the Billboard Hot Country Songs chart in February 2008, becoming the second top 40 hit of McGraw's career to miss the top 10.

Ken Tucker of Billboard described McGraw's cover positively, saying that McGraw sings "like a man who knows what it's like to have heads turn when your wife walks into the room".

=== Chart performance ===
Chart (2007–2008)	Peak position
Canada Country (Billboard)	12
US Hot Country Songs (Billboard)	12
US Billboard Hot 100	87
