= Last Dollar (Fly Away) =

Single by Tim McGraw

from the album Let It Go
- Released: January 8, 2007
- Recorded: 2006
- Genre: Country
- Length: 4:30 (album version); 3:57 (radio edit)
- Label: Curb
- Songwriter: Big Kenny
- Producers: Tim McGraw; Darran Smith; Byron Gallimore

Tim McGraw singles chronology
"My Little Girl" (2006)	"Last Dollar (Fly Away)" (2007)	"I Need You" (2007)

"Last Dollar (Fly Away)" is a song written by Big Kenny, one half of the duo Big & Rich, and recorded by American country music artist Tim McGraw. It was released in January 2007 as the first single from his album Let It Go. "Last Dollar (Fly Away)" reached Number One on the Billboard Hot Country Songs charts, becoming McGraw's first Number One country hit since "Back When" in late 2004. Big Kenny later recorded the song for his 2010 album, Big Kenny's Love Everybody Traveling Musical Medicine Show Mix Tape, Vol. 1.

== Background ==
William Kenneth Alphin, otherwise known as Big Kenny, one-half of country rock duo Big & Rich, wrote "Last Dollar" after a disastrous night of gambling in Las Vegas on New Year's Eve in 2002.

He and his manager were in the city as part of the Alabama farewell tour. Alphin had $200 to his name and $140,000 in credit card debt, and in hopes of increasing his cash on hand, he went to the blackjack tables. At one point, he had won nearly $1,000, but instead of stopping, he continued to play. Eventually, he lost all but $21. He gave the dealer a $20 tip, leaving Alphin with literally his last dollar. "That night as I looked down at the sole breaking off of my shoe it hit me like a ton of bricks," Alphin said. "But with that realization came the freedom of knowing that I also had nothing to lose."

From that point, Alphin's career took off, both as a songwriter and as part of the duo Big & Rich. Several years after the incident, he played some of his songs for McGraw. "I'll never forget the day I played him the song," Alphin said. "We were at Blackbird Studio and Tim was making a new album. As we sat together in my truck, I played him a couple of the songs that I was recording. The second song I played was "Last Dollar." He looked over at me and said, "Are you gonna let me record that?"

== Content ==
The song is an up-tempo in the key of E Major. Its lyrics take the point of view of a man who is "down to [his] last dollar", but still in a positive mood ("One, two, three, like a bird I sing / 'Cause you've given me the most beautiful set of wings").

McGraw's daughters, Gracie, Maggie, and Audrey, sing on the song's final chorus. When Alphin heard McGraw's final version, with the children joining in at the end, "I nearly lost it," he said. "That moment of reflection in Las Vegas all that time ago gave me the hope to keep going and now five years later, that hope is a hit song for my friend Tim McGraw."

== Critical reception ==
Kevin John Coyne, reviewing the song for Country Universe, gave it a B rating. He said the song is "a wry twist on the 'I’m poor, but rich because I have you' nonsense that often passes for a love song in country music." He then added that the only problem with the single is the high number of production tricks.

== Music video ==
The music video is partially a live video, and was directed by Sherman Halsey, and it premiered on CMT on New Year's Day 2007. At the end, his kids, and his wife Faith Hill are shown, as well as producer Byron Gallimore and his kids. The video is very grainy and many of the shots are vintage-looking or very blurry. A 1940s style camera was used for the filming.

== Track listing ==
US promotional CD single Curb CURBD-2015

1. "Last Dollar (Fly Away)" Album Version 4:29
2. "Last Dollar (Fly Away)" Radio Edit 3:57
3. Suggested Callout Research Hook :10

== Chart performance ==
"Last Dollar (Fly Away)" debuted at number 50 on the U.S. Billboard Hot Country Songs for the week of January 13, 2007. The song reached Number One on the Billboard US Hot Country Songs chart dated April 14, 2007. "Last Dollar" also entered the Billboard Hot 100 at number 81 on April 7, 2007; one week later, it reached its peak at number 13 on that chart.

Chart (2007)	Peak position
Canada Country (Billboard)	1
US Hot Country Songs (Billboard)	1
US Billboard Hot 100	13
US Billboard Pop 100	18

=== Year-end charts ===
Chart (2007)	Position
US Country Songs (Billboard)	17

== Certifications ==
Region	Certification	Certified units/sales
United States (RIAA)	Gold	500,000^{^}
^{^} Shipments figures based on certification alone.
