= My Little Girl (Tim McGraw song) =

Single by Tim McGraw

from the album Reflected: Greatest Hits Vol. 2 and the film Flicka
- Released: August 7, 2006
- Genre: Country
- Length: 3:39
- Label: Curb
- Songwriters: Tim McGraw; Tom Douglas
- Producers: Byron Gallimore; Tim McGraw

Tim McGraw singles chronology
"When the Stars Go Blue" (2006)	"My Little Girl" (2006)	"Last Dollar (Fly Away)" (2007)

"My Little Girl" is a song co-written and recorded by American country music singer Tim McGraw that reached the top three on the Billboard Hot Country Songs chart. It was released in August 2006 as the second single from his compilation album Tim McGraw Reflected: Greatest Hits Vol. 2. The song was also featured on the 2006 film, Flicka, which McGraw starred in. It was nominated by the Broadcast Film Critics Association for Best Song in 2006. McGraw co-wrote the song with Tom Douglas, making it the first single of McGraw's career that he had a hand in writing.

== Content ==
The narrator of the song addresses his daughter, telling her that even though she is growing up, she will always be "[his] little girl".

== Critical reception ==
Kevin John Coyne, reviewing the song for Country Universe, gave it a negative rating. He said that the song is "so sugary-sweet it can cause cavities." He then says that compared to his last single, "When The Stars Go Blue", this song is a letdown.

== Music video ==
The video shows many scenes from the movie, Flicka, while McGraw is shown singing the song with his band in front of an orchestra. It was directed by Sherman Halsey. It was released in late September, 2006.

== Chart performance ==
"My Little Girl" debuted at number 51 on the U.S. Billboard Hot Country Songs for the week of August 12, 2006.

Chart (2006–2007)	Peak position
Canada Country (Billboard)	3
US Hot Country Songs (Billboard)	3
US Billboard Hot 100	35
US Billboard Pop 100	49
US Adult Contemporary (Billboard)	15

=== Year-end charts ===
Chart (2006)	Position
US Country Songs (Billboard)	56

Chart (2007)	Position
US Country Songs (Billboard)	54
US Adult Contemporary (Billboard)	37

== Certifications ==
Certifications for My Little Girl
Region	Certification	Certified units/sales
United States (RIAA)	2× Platinum	2,000,000^{‡}
^{‡} Sales+streaming figures based on certification alone.
