= Let It Go (Tim McGraw song) =

Single by Tim McGraw

from the album Let It Go
- Released: July 21, 2008
- Genre: Country
- Length: 3:45
- Label: Curb
- Songwriters: Aimee Mayo; Bill Luther; Tom Douglas
- Producers: Byron Gallimore; Darran Smith; Tim McGraw

Tim McGraw singles chronology
"Nine Lives" (2008)	"Let It Go" (2008)	"Nothin' to Die For" (2009)

"Let It Go" is a song written by Aimee Mayo, Bill Luther and Tom Douglas, and recorded by American country music singer Tim McGraw. It was released in July 2008 as the sixth single and title track from his album Let It Go. It was his forty-second Top 40 hit on the Billboard country charts.

== Content ==
The song is a mid-tempo which describes a man's observation on his life and the "demons" that have been causing him personal discomfort. Ultimately, he convinces himself to "let it go" and improve his outlook on life.

== Critical reception ==
The song received a "thumbs down" review from the country music site Engine 145. Reviewer Brady Vercher said, "The song avoids becoming a motivational sermon by having the narrator focus inward, upon himself, but all we learn is that he's trying to put the skeletons in his closet behind him and move on. Ultimately, without any sort of supporting story, the lyric is[…]generic enough to be applicable to nearly any situation." He also said that McGraw gave an "uninspired" vocal performance. Allmusic critic Thom Jurek described the song favorably in his review of the album, calling it "the real shock" of the album and saying that it "offer[s] a message of threadbare hope in the face of adversity. In the grain of his voice, you can hear the determination to talk and walk from the place of redemption rather than the terrain of suffering. He's singing to convince himself as much as he is the listener."

== Chart positions ==
Before the release of "Let It Go", McGraw had reportedly announced in concert that he was planning to release a new album late in 2008. However, Curb Records decided to delay the album's release, and instead released "Let It Go" as the sixth single from Let It Go. The song debuted at number 59 on the Hot Country Songs charts dated for August 2, 2008, reaching a peak of number 2 on the chart week of December 6 and holding that position for two weeks.

Chart (2008)	Peak position
US Hot Country Songs (Billboard)	2
US Billboard Hot 100	47
Canada Country (Billboard)	4
Canada Hot 100 (Billboard)	75

=== Year-end charts ===
Chart (2008)	Position
US Country Songs (Billboard)	45
