= Tim McGraw =

American country singer and actor (born 1967)

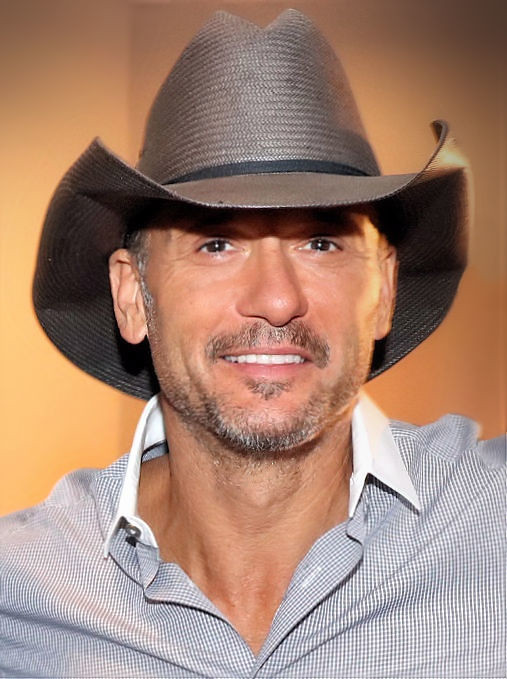
- McGraw in 2015
- Born: Samuel Timothy McGraw; May 1, 1967 (age 59); Delhi, Louisiana, U.S.
- Occupations: Singer; songwriter; record producer; actor
- Years active: 1990–present
- Spouse: Faith Hill (m. 1996)
- Children: 3
- Father: Tug McGraw
- Musical career
- Genres: Country; honky-tonk; Southern rock; adult contemporary
- Instruments: Vocals; guitar
- Works: Albums; singles
- Labels: Curb; Big Machine; Arista Nashville; Columbia Nashville
- Website: timmcgraw.com

Samuel Timothy McGraw (born May 1, 1967) is an American country singer and actor. He has released 17 studio albums (11 for Curb Records, five for Big Machine Records and one for Arista Nashville). Ten of those albums have reached number one on the Top Country Albums charts, with his 1994 breakthrough album Not a Moment Too Soon being the top country album of 1994. In total, McGraw's albums have produced 65 singles, 25 of which have reached number one on the Hot Country Songs or Country Airplay charts.

Three of these singles – "It's Your Love", "Just to See You Smile", and "Live Like You Were Dying" – were respectively the top country songs of 1997, 1998, and 2004 according to Billboard Year-End. He has also won three Grammy Awards, 14 Academy of Country Music awards, 11 Country Music Association (CMA) awards, 10 American Music Awards, and three People's Choice Awards. His Soul2Soul II Tour, which was done in partnership with his wife and contemporary, Faith Hill, is one of the highest-grossing tours in country music history, and one of the top five among all genres of music. He has sold more than 80 million records worldwide, making him one of the best-selling music artists of all time.

McGraw has ventured into acting, with supporting roles in The Blind Side, Friday Night Lights, The Kingdom, Tomorrowland, Four Christmases, flashback scenes in 2 episodes of Yellowstone, and The Shack as well as lead roles in Flicka (2006), Country Strong (2010), and 1883 (2021). He was a minority owner of the Arena Football League's Nashville Kats. McGraw has been married to singer Faith Hill since 1996 and is the eldest son of former Major League Baseball (MLB) pitcher Tug McGraw.

McGraw was inducted into the Country Music Hall of Fame in 2026.

== Early life and education ==
Samuel Timothy McGraw was born in Delhi, Louisiana, the only child of Elizabeth "Betty" Ann D'Agostino, a waitress from Jacksonville, Florida, and Frank Edwin "Tug" McGraw Jr., a pitcher for the minor league Jacksonville Suns and future star pitcher for the New York Mets and the Philadelphia Phillies. In 1966, D'Agostino was a student at Terry Parker High School. She lived in the same apartment building as Tug McGraw, who was playing baseball for Jacksonville. When she became pregnant with McGraw as a teen, D'Agostino's parents sent her to Louisiana to live with relatives. Through his father, McGraw has two half-brothers, Mark and Matthew, and a half-sister named Cari. He also has two younger half-sisters, Tracey and Sandra, through his mother's marriage to Horace Smith.

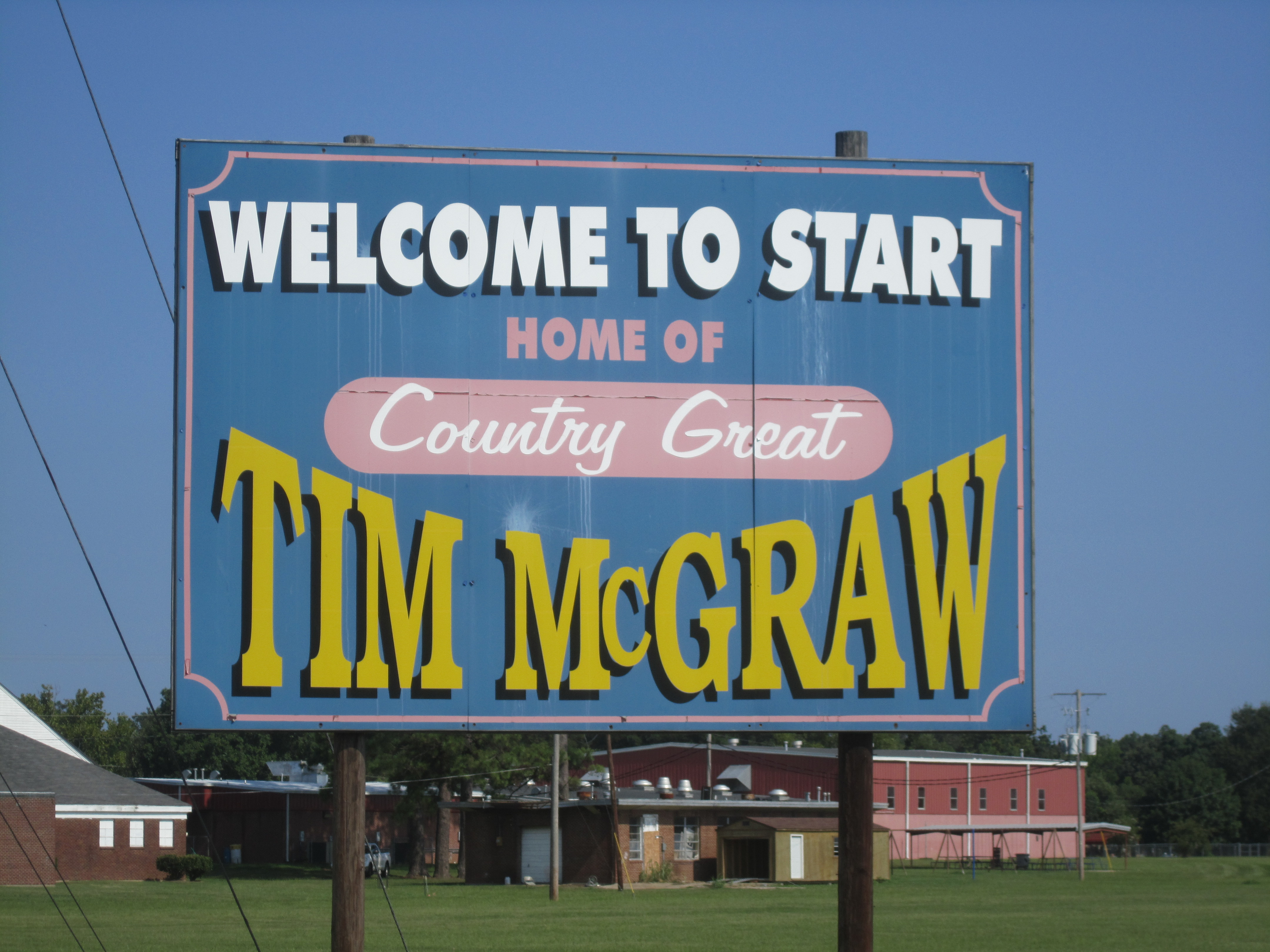
Start, Louisiana, welcome sign notes that McGraw once resided there.

McGraw grew up believing Smith was his father, and used this stepfather's surname until meeting Tug. At age 11, McGraw discovered his birth certificate while searching in his mother's closet whilst looking for money to buy sweets. Following the discovery, he learned from her who his biological father was and she took him to meet the elder McGraw for the first time. Tug McGraw denied the parentage for seven years until Tim was 18 years old. After that time, the two formed a relationship and remained close until the former baseball star died in 2004.

As a child, McGraw played competitive sports, including baseball, even before the knowledge of who his father was and his professional baseball career. McGraw was also a member of the FFA in high school. Following high school graduation, he attended Northeast Louisiana University on a baseball scholarship, where he was a pre-law major and pledged as a member of Pi Kappa Alpha fraternity. A knee injury sustained while playing baseball for the college prevented him from pursuing a professional career in sports.

While in college, McGraw learned to play guitar and would frequently perform and sing for money. He has claimed his roommates often hid the guitar because he was so bad. McGraw followed his mother when she returned to Jacksonville, Florida, in 1987. After the move, he attended Florida Community College at Jacksonville for one term, and occasionally sat in with local bands. In 1989, on the day his hero Keith Whitley died, McGraw dropped out of college to head to Nashville and pursue a musical career.

== Music career ==
=== 1990s ===
==== Tim McGraw ====
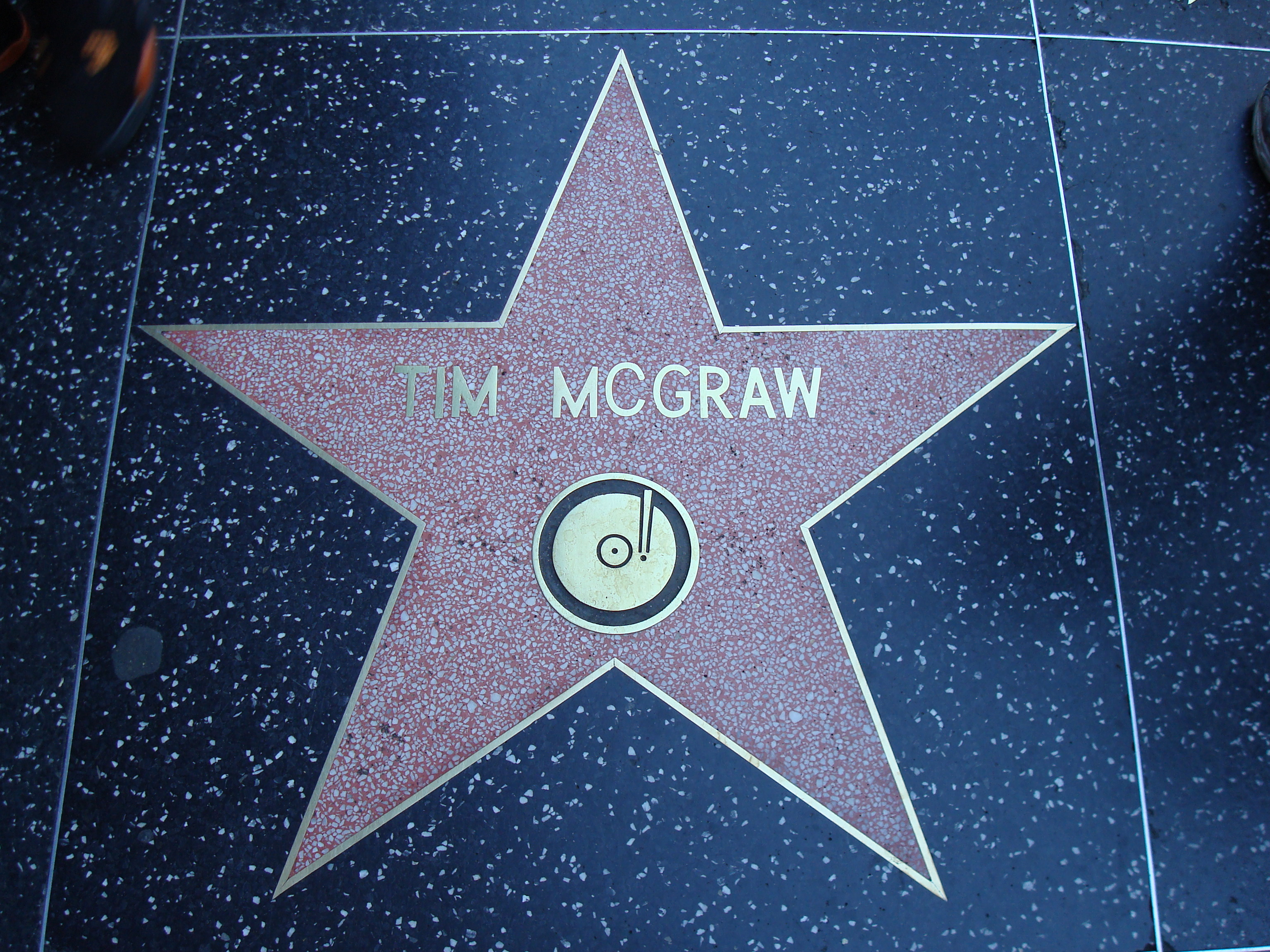
Tim McGraw's star on the Hollywood Walk of Fame

McGraw came to the attention of Curb Records in 1990. After cutting a demo single, McGraw gave a copy to his father. A man who was friends with Curb Records executives heard the demo while driving with Tug one day and recommended that Curb contact the young singer. Several weeks later, he was able to play his tape for Curb executives, after which they signed him to a recording contract. McGraw made his debut with the single "What Room Was the Holiday In", which was released on March 29, 1991, and did not enter the Billboard Hot Country Songs chart upon its release. In a 2001 retrospective on McGraw's career in Billboard, a former program director for Nashville station WSM-FM said that he added the song to the station's playlist because it showed "undeniable promise", while another former program director at WXTU in Philadelphia, Pennsylvania, recalled that McGraw's debut single was "terrible" but that he booked the singer to make an appearance at the station due to his father's fame.

Two years later in April 1993, McGraw released his debut album Tim McGraw, which was commercially unsuccessful and did not sell well. This is his only studio album not to achieve a music recording sales certification or to enter the Top Country Albums charts. Three more singles were released from Tim McGraw: "Welcome to the Club", "Memory Lane", and "Two Steppin' Mind". None made country Top 40 and the album itself did not chart. Both "Memory Lane" and "Tears in the Rain", another cut from the album, were co-written by Joe Diffie. "Memory Lane" had originally appeared on Keith Palmer's self-titled 1991 debut album. McGraw later appeared in his friend and future collaborator Tracy Lawrence's music video for "My Second Home" in 1993.

==== Not a Moment Too Soon ====
McGraw's second album, entitled Not a Moment Too Soon, was much more successful than his self-titled debut, and it was the best-selling country album of 1994. Its first single, "Indian Outlaw", sparked controversy, as critics argued that it presented Native Americans in a patronizing way. Some radio stations even chose not to play it. However, the controversy helped spur sales, and the song became McGraw's first Top 10 entry on the U.S. country charts after getting as high as number 8. The song also peaked at number 15 on the Billboard Hot 100.

The album's second single, "Don't Take the Girl", became McGraw's first number one on the U.S. country charts, in addition to peaking at number 17 on the Billboard Hot 100. The song also "helped cement his image as a ruggedly good-looking guy with a sensitive side." By year's end, the third single from the album, "Down on the Farm" peaked at number 2; after that, the album's fourth single, also its title track, became the singer's second number one song in early 1995. The fifth and final single "Refried Dreams" reached number 5. The album sold over 6 million copies, topping the Billboard 200 and Top Country Album charts. On the strength of this success, McGraw won Academy of Country Music awards for Album of the Year and Top New Male Vocalist in 1994. Billboard named Not a Moment Too Soon as the top country album of 1994 on Billboard Year-End.

==== All I Want ====
McGraw's third studio album, All I Want, was released in 1995. Just like its predecessor, this album debuted at No. 1 on the country charts. The album even sold over 2 million copies in the United States and reached the Top 5 on the Billboard 200. The album's first single, "I Like It, I Love It", became McGraw's third number one on the American country charts and it also peaked at number 25 on the Billboard Hot 100. This song also eventually became the goal song for the Nashville Predators once they began their inaugural season and since then has been left unchanged. The album's next two singles, "Can't Be Really Gone" and "All I Want Is a Life" (its partial title track) both made the top 5 at numbers 2 and 5, respectively. The fourth single, "She Never Lets It Go to Her Heart", gave McGraw his fourth number one on the U.S. country charts in 1996. Finishing off the singles was "Maybe We Should Just Sleep on It", which peaked at number 4.

In 1996, McGraw headlined the most successful country tour of the year, The Spontaneous Combustion Tour, with Faith Hill as his supporting act. Hill broke off her engagement to her former producer Scott Hendricks so that she and McGraw could start dating each other; they then married on October 6, 1996.

==== Everywhere ====
The singer's fourth album, Everywhere was released in 1997. It topped the country charts as well and reached No. 2 on the Billboard 200, selling 4 million copies. The album spawned six singles. Four of those singles - "It's Your Love" (a duet with Faith Hill), the title track, "Where the Green Grass Grows", and "Just to See You Smile" - reached number one on the country charts. The Country Music Association awarded Everywhere its Album of the Year award for 1997. At the 40th Grammy Awards, "It's Your Love" received two Grammy Award nominations for Best Country Collaboration With Vocals and Best Country Song. Both "It's Your Love" and "Just to See You Smile" were the number one country songs of 1997 and 1998 according to Billboard Year-End charts; "Just to See You Smile" also set a record for the longest run on the country charts at the time, at 42 weeks. The album's other two singles, "One of These Days" and "For a Little While" both peaked at number 2.

==== A Place in the Sun ====
McGraw's fifth album, A Place in the Sun, continued his streak in 1999, debuting atop both the US country and pop album charts and selling 3 million copies. Over 251,000 of those copies were sold during its first week, making this the singer's first number 1 opener on the Billboard 200. It produced another four number one hits on the U.S. country charts with "Please Remember Me", "Something Like That", "My Best Friend", and "My Next Thirty Years". "Some Things Never Change" peaked at number 7 on the charts. McGraw also contributed a song for the Grammy-winning tribute album to Bob Wills entitled Ride With Bob. A cover of "Milk Cow Blues", this song was recorded as a duet with Asleep at the Wheel, whom he had met while performing together at the George Strait Country Music Festival.

McGraw recorded two more duets with his wife in the late-1990s, both of which appeared on her albums. "Just to Hear You Say That You Love Me", from her multi-platinum-certified 1998 album Faith, reached the Top 5 of the US country charts. Her follow-up album, 1999's Breathe, featured "Let's Make Love", which won a Grammy Award for Best Country Vocal Collaboration in 2000.

=== 2000s ===
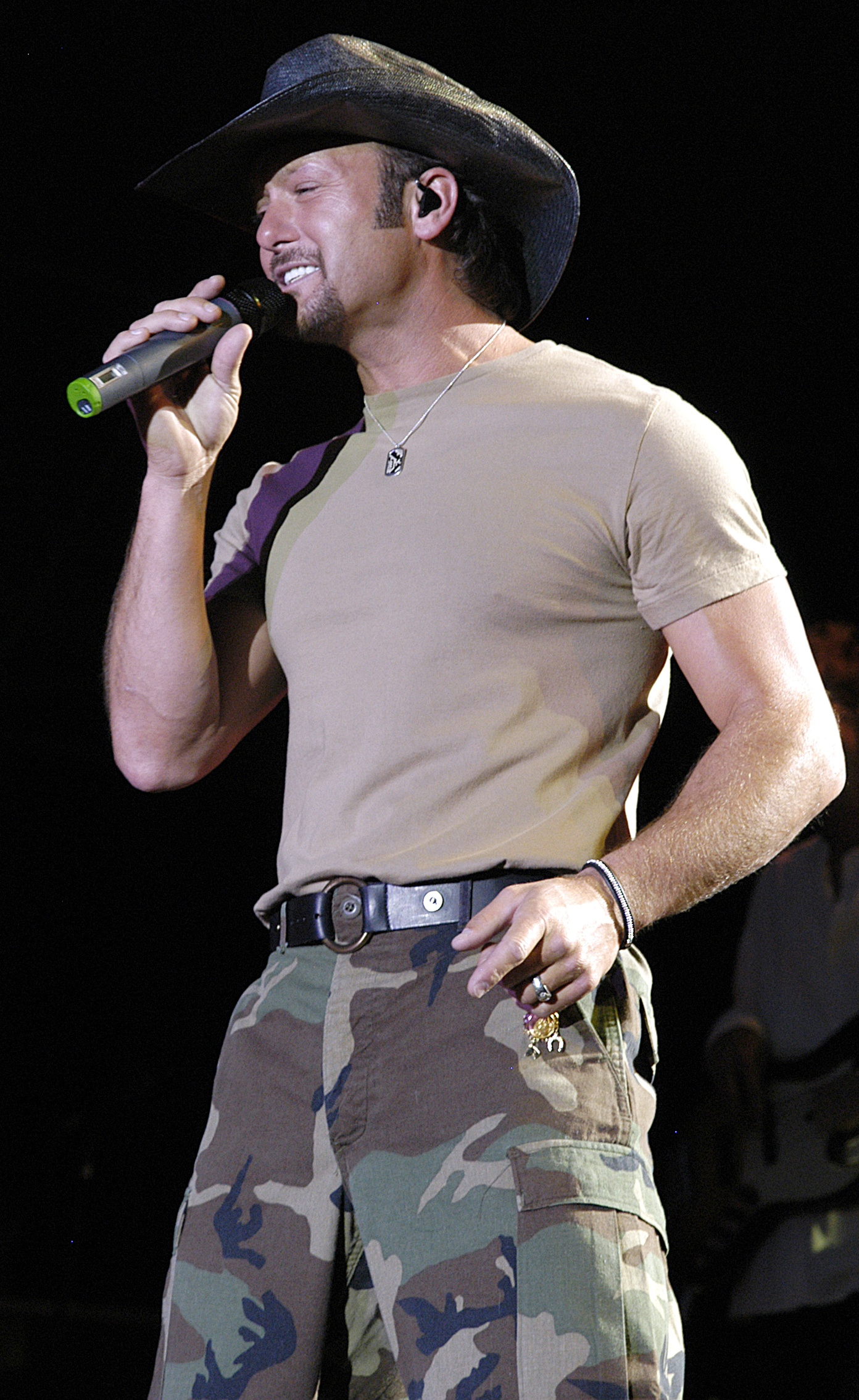
McGraw performing for the United States Air Force in 2003

==== Greatest Hits ====
In 2000, McGraw released his first Greatest Hits album, which topped the country albums charts for nine weeks and sold nearly 6 million copies, making this one of the biggest-selling albums in the modern country market. In the latter half of the year, he and Hill went out on the Soul2Soul Tour, playing to sellout crowds in 64 venues, including Madison Square Garden. The tour was one of the top tours of any genre in the U.S. It was also the leading country tour of 2000. While in Buffalo, New York, McGraw and Kenny Chesney became involved in a scuffle with police officers after Chesney attempted to ride a police horse. McGraw came to Chesney's aid after police officers nearby believed the horse was being stolen and tried to arrest him. The two were arrested and charged with assault but were later cleared. During a concert with the George Strait Country Music Festival several weeks later, Hill, dressed as a police officer, made an unscheduled appearance at the end of McGraw's set and led him off the stage.

==== Set This Circus Down ====
McGraw's sixth studio album, Set This Circus Down, was released in April 2001. It even spawned four number one hits on the country charts as well, this time with "Grown Men Don't Cry", "Angry All the Time" (with Faith Hill), "The Cowboy in Me", and "Unbroken". The singer provided harmony vocals for Jo Dee Messina's song "Bring On the Rain", which he also produced. That song topped the country charts. Hungry for more of his music, fans downloaded a version of his performance of the song "Things Change" from his appearance at the Country Music Association Awards Show. The song was played extensively on radio, becoming the first country song to appear on the charts from a fully downloaded version.

==== Tim McGraw and the Dancehall Doctors ====
In 2002, McGraw bucked country music traditions by recording his seventh studio album Tim McGraw and the Dancehall Doctors with his tour band The Dancehall Doctors. Unlike rock music—where it is commonplace for touring bands to provide the music on albums recorded by the artist they support, country albums are typically recorded with session musicians. McGraw chose to use his own touring band, in order to recognize their part in his success, and to capture some of the feel of a real band.

All of the Dancehall Doctors have worked with McGraw since at least 1996. Their lineup includes:

- Darran Smith – lead guitar, acoustic guitar
- Bob Minner – rhythm guitar, acoustic guitar, banjo, mandolin
- Denny Hemingson – steel guitar, electric, baritone, and slide guitars, dobro
- John Marcus – bass guitar
- Dean Brown – fiddle, mandolin
- Jeff McMahon – piano, organ, synthesizer, keyboards ... etc.
- Billy Mason – drums
- David Dunkley – percussion

The album debuted at No. 2 on the country albums charts, Its fourth and fifth singles "Real Good Man" and "Watch the Wind Blow By" both climbed to number one on the U.S. Billboard Hot Country Songs chart. "She's My Kind of Rain" peaked at No. 2 in 2003, and "Red Rag Top" reached number 5. The album also features a cover of Elton John's early-1970s classic "Tiny Dancer," as well as duets with Kim Carnes on "Comfort Me" (a response to the September 11, 2001 attacks) and Don Henley and Timothy B. Schmit of the Eagles on "Illegal." "She's My Kind of Rain" also received a Grammy Award nomination for Best Country Vocal Performance-Male at the 46th Grammy Awards.

==== Live Like You Were Dying ====
His eighth album, 2004's Live Like You Were Dying, continued the singer's record of commercial success. The album's first single and its title track was dedicated to his father Tug McGraw, who died of a brain tumor earlier in the year, was an ode to living life fully and in the moment. The second single "Back When" was a paean to an easy nostalgia. In December 2019, McGraw spoke on stage at the annual End Well Symposium about why he wrote "Live Like You Were Dying" and his struggles with caregiving for his dying father. "Live Like You Were Dying" spent seven non-consecutive weeks at No. 1 on Billboard and went on to become the top country song of 2004 on the Billboard Year-End charts. It also became one of the most awarded records by winning ACM Single and Song of the Year, CMA Single and Song of the Year, and a Grammy. "Back When" went to number one on the country charts as well. The album produced three more singles with "Drugs or Jesus", "Do You Want Fries with That", and "My Old Friend". "Drugs or Jesus" became McGraw's first single since 1993 to not ever reach within the Top 10 on the U.S. country charts, while "Do You Want Fries with That" and "My Old Friend" peaked at numbers 5 and 6, respectively.

In late 2004, his unlikely duet with hip hop artist Nelly on "Over and Over" became a crossover hit, spending 10 weeks atop the top 40 chart. "Over and Over" brought McGraw a success he had never previously experienced on contemporary hit radio or R&B radio, and brought both artists success neither had previously experienced in the hot adult contemporary market. The song also spent a week at the top of the charts in the United Kingdom, becoming McGraw's first hit single in Britain and Nelly's third number one hit in the country after "Dilemma" and "My Place". "Over and Over" also reached the top of the charts in Australia, New Zealand, and the Republic of Ireland, and the top 10 in Austria, Canada, Denmark, Germany, Romania, and Switzerland.

Throughout the 2005 NFL season, McGraw sang an alternate version of "I Like It, I Love It" every week during the season. The alternate lyrics, which changed each week, would make reference to plays during Sunday's games, and the song would be played alongside video highlights during halftime on Monday Night Football. Later in the year, McGraw became a minority owner of the Arena Football League's Nashville Kats when majority owner Bud Adams (owner of the NFL's Tennessee Titans) was awarded the expansion franchise.

==== Let It Go ====
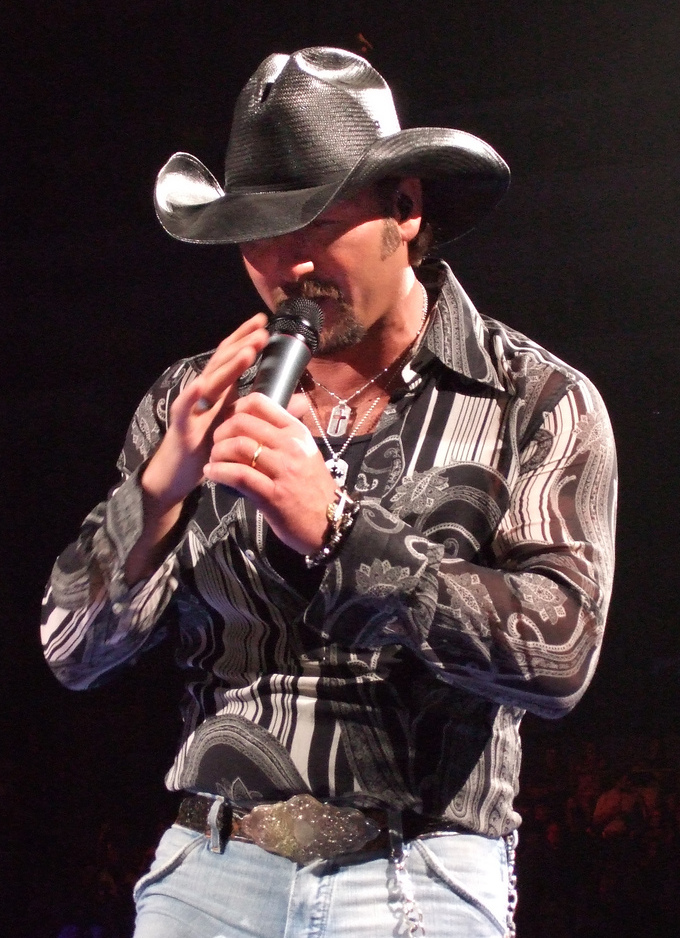
McGraw performing during the Soul2Soul Tour, July 2006

In April 2006, McGraw and Hill began their 73-concert 55-city Soul2Soul II Tour, again to strong commercial acceptance. The tour grossed roughly $89 million and sold approximately 1.1 million tickets, making it the top-grossing tour in the history of country music. It was also named "Major Tour of the Year" by Pollstar, beating out such heavyweights as Madonna and the Rolling Stones. In a special gesture, the couple donated all of the profits from their performance in New Orleans to Hurricane Katrina relief. McGraw, along with Kenny Chesney, contributed to a version of Tracy Lawrence's song "Find Out Who Your Friends Are", which can be found on Lawrence's album For the Love. Although the official single version features only Lawrence's vocals, many stations have opted to play the version with McGraw and Chesney instead.

McGraw released his eleventh studio album, Let It Go, on March 27, 2007. The album's first single, "Last Dollar (Fly Away)", peaked at number one on the Hot Country Songs chart. This marked McGraw's first No. 1 single since "Back When" in late 2004. The album debuted at No. 1 on both the Billboard 200 and Top Country Album charts, marking his fourth No. 1 album on the 200 charts and his ninth overall. His daughters can be heard singing the chorus during the last few seconds of the song on the video. During the Academy of Country Music awards show on May 15, 2007, McGraw performed a song titled "If You're Reading This", which he co-wrote with The Warren Brothers. Several radio stations began to play the live recording of the song; as a result, it entered the U.S. Billboard Hot Country Songs chart at No. 35. McGraw also produced the debut album of country music duo Halfway to Hazard. The duo's first single, "Daisy", peaked at No. 39 on the country charts in the summer of 2007. In the summer of 2007, McGraw and Hill toured together once again in the Soul2Soul 2007 tour.

In the edition of January 18, 2008 of the USA Today newspaper, McGraw was stated to be featured on the Def Leppard album Songs from the Sparkle Lounge, having also co-written the first single, "Nine Lives", with Def Leppard band members Joe Elliott, Phil Collen, and Rick Savage. The unusual pairing goes back to 2006 when McGraw joined Def Leppard onstage for the song "Pour Some Sugar On Me", and then collaborated on the song "Nine Lives" afterward. The album was released on April 25, 2008. At the 2007 50th Annual Grammy Awards, McGraw received 5 nominations including Best Country Album (for Let It Go), Best Country Song (both for "If You're Reading This" and "I Need You"), Best Country Collaboration with Vocals (with "I Need You"), and Best Male Country Vocal Performance (with "If You're Reading This"). In May 2008, he hit the road with the Live Your Voice tour. The mainly-outdoor arena concert tour was his first solo outing in nearly three years. Also in May 2008, he debuted a new song in his follow-up to Let It Go at the Stagecoach Music Festival in Indio, California. In July 2008, the album's sixth single and its title track, "Let It Go", was released to country radio. Following that, a seventh single, "Nothin' to Die For", entered the Country charts at No. 57 in late December. McGraw released his third greatest-hits package, Greatest Hits 3 on October 7, 2008. The album features 12 tracks. McGraw was set to debut a new song at the 2009 ACM Awards, but then canceled his performance; he was replaced by Blake Shelton, who sang "She Wouldn't Be Gone".

==== Southern Voice ====
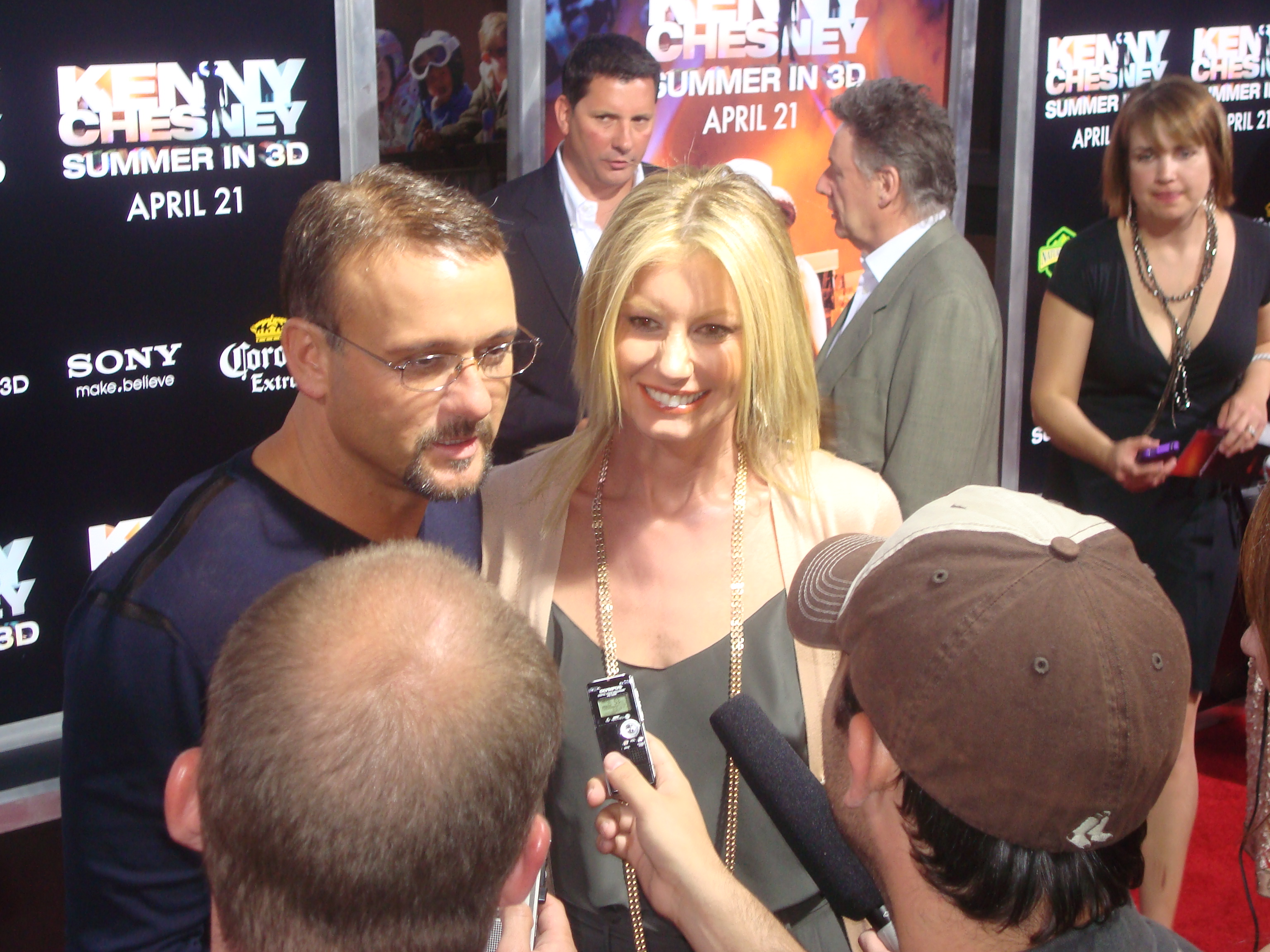
Tim McGraw with Faith Hill at the 2009 American Music Awards

McGraw's twelfth studio album, Southern Voice, was released October 20, 2009, and led by the single "It's A Business Doing Pleasure With You", which was shipped to radio outlets in late June 2009. Southern Voice was argued to be McGraw's last album for Curb Records, following the dispute over releasing his third Greatest Hits collection back in October 2008 without his permission. McGraw did not approve of the release. On November 30, 2010, Curb Records released his fourth greatest hits compilation, Number One Hits.

=== 2010s ===
==== Emotional Traffic and Curb Records lawsuit ====
On January 2, 2011, McGraw announced plans for his Emotional Traffic Tour featuring opening acts Luke Bryan and The Band Perry. SiriusXM announced on March 30, 2011, that they would be launching Tim McGraw radio, a commercial-free music channel devoted to McGraw's music, and featuring an in-depth interview with McGraw as well. As of fall 2010, McGraw had finished work on the album Emotional Traffic, his last album with Curb Records. On May 13, 2011, Curb Records filed a breach-of-contract suit against McGraw. The label alleged that McGraw recorded tracks for his Emotional Traffic album too early prior to its delivery to the label. Several days later, McGraw filed a counter suit against the label seeking advance payment and recording-fund reimbursement, unspecified damages, and a jury trial. A trial was scheduled to begin in July 2012. In November 2011, a judge granted McGraw permission to record music for another label, ending his relationship with Curb Records that began in 1990. A few hours after the ruling, Curb released "Better Than I Used to Be", the first single from Emotional Traffic. The album was released on January 24, 2012.

==== Two Lanes of Freedom ====
In December 2011, McGraw released his first Christmas single, "Christmas All Over the World", on his own label StyleSonic Records. On May 21, 2012, however, he signed with Big Machine Records. McGraw's debut album for Big Machine, entitled Two Lanes of Freedom, was released on February 5, 2013. It debuted at number 2 on the charts by selling 108,000 copies. The album includes the singles "Truck Yeah", "One of Those Nights", "Highway Don't Care" (a duet with Taylor Swift which also features Keith Urban on lead guitar), and "Southern Girl". McGraw performed at the C2C: Country to Country festival in London on March 16, 2013.

==== Love Story and Sundown Heaven Town ====
McGraw released a single titled "Lookin' for That Girl" in January 2014 as the lead-off single to his second album for Big Machine. It was followed immediately by the announcement of the Sundown Heaven Town Tour. The album, titled Sundown Heaven Town, was released on September 16, 2014. Four months into its run, "Lookin' for That Girl" was withdrawn as a single and replaced with "Meanwhile, Back at Mama's", which features backing vocals from Hill. "Shotgun Rider" became the album's third single and a number 1 Country Airplay hit by the end of 2014. Following it was "Diamond Rings and Old Barstools", a duet with Catherine Dunn. McGraw's eighth greatest hits album, Love Story, is a compilation of his twelve biggest love songs and two previously unreleased recordings. It was released exclusively through Walmart on February 4, 2014, by Curb Records.

==== Damn Country Music ====
On August 10, 2015, McGraw released a new single to digital retailers, titled "Top of the World", which was later released to radio on August 17, 2015, as the lead single to his third studio album for Big Machine Records. On September 17, McGraw announced that the album was titled Damn Country Music, with a release date scheduled for November 6. The album's second single, "Humble and Kind", released to country radio on February 1, 2016, and went on to reach number 1 on the Billboard Hot Country charts. McGraw was selected as one of 30 artists to perform on "Forever Country", a mash-up track of Take Me Home, Country Roads, On the Road Again and I Will Always Love You which celebrates 50 years of the CMA Awards. The album's third single, "How I'll Always Be" released to country radio on July 11, 2016. It reached number 3 on the Country Airplay in January 2017.

==== The Rest of Our Life ====
On October 4, 2016, during a show at the Ryman Auditorium, McGraw and Hill announced that they would be going back on the road together again on the Soul2Soul World Tour. The tour began on April 7, 2017, in New Orleans and continued into 2018, incorporating the C2C: Country to Country festival held in the UK and Ireland throughout March 2018.

Its second and final leg ended on July 22, 2018, at the Golden 1 Center in Sacramento.

Before the commencement of the tour, it was reported that McGraw, alongside Hill, had signed a new deal with Sony Music Nashville. The signing also indicated the release of a duet album between the couple, and that multiple solo recordings would be produced. The new record label signing also preceded the release of "Speak to a Girl", the lead single from the duet album, The Rest of Our Life, which was released on November 17, 2017. The release of the album coincided with the opening of an exhibit at the Country Music Hall of Fame and Museum titled Mississippi Woman, Louisiana Man, which celebrates the careers of both McGraw and Hill.

McGraw released two major best-selling books in 2019, with the first co-written with "Pulitzer Prize" winner Jon Meacham which reached No. 2 on the New York Times Bestsellers list. Songs of America: Patriotism, Protest, and the Music That Made a Nation. New York: Random House. 2019. ISBN 978-0593132951. His second book, "Grit and Grace", also reached No. 2 on the New York Times Bestsellers list.

=== 2020s ===
==== Here on Earth ====
In February 2020, McGraw rejoined Big Machine Records, which he was previously signed to from 2011 to 2017. He released a new album, Here on Earth, on August 21, 2020. The "Here on Earth Tour" was cancelled due to the COVID-19 pandemic. In January 2021, McGraw released the single "Undivided" with Tyler Hubbard of Florida Georgia Line, which was included on a deluxe edition of Here on Earth released later that year. On October 9, 2021, McGraw confronted a heckler at a performance at the Nugget Events Center in Sparks, Nevada, after he forgot the words to his song "Just to See You Smile." After removing the heckler, he explained that he had been filming a movie and had a lot on his mind, and asked for the audience's help in remembering the words.

==== Standing Room Only and Poet's Resumé ====
On August 25, 2023, McGraw released his sixteenth studio album, Standing Room Only. The title track was released as the album's lead single on March 10, 2023. It reached number 2 on the U.S. Country Airplay chart. Three months after releasing Standing Room Only, McGraw surprise-released a six-track EP, Poet's Resumé on November 21, 2023.

== Production career ==
McGraw has occasionally served as a record producer in collaboration with Byron Gallimore, who has co-produced all of his albums. The two co-produced Jo Dee Messina's self-titled debut, as well as her next two albums, I'm Alright and Burn. McGraw and Gallimore also produced the only album released by The Clark Family Experience in 2000, and Halfway to Hazard's 2007 self-titled debut album.

== Acting career ==
McGraw's first acting appearance came in a 1997 episode of The Jeff Foxworthy Show, where he played Foxworthy's rival. In 2004, McGraw played a sheriff in Rick Schroder's independent release Black Cloud. Later in the same year, McGraw received critical acclaim as the overbearing father of running back "Donald Billingsley" in the major studio Texas high school football drama Friday Night Lights. The Dallas Observer said the role was "played with unexpected ferocity by country singer Tim McGraw". The movie went on to gross over $60 million worldwide at the box office, and sold millions in the DVD market. Most recently, it was named one of the Top 50 High School Movies of All Time (No. 37) by Entertainment Weekly.

McGraw's first lead role was in the 2006 film Flicka, which was released in theaters October 20, 2006. In the remake of the classic book My Friend Flicka, McGraw played the father, Rob, costarring with Alison Lohman and Maria Bello. The family-friendly movie debuted in the top 10 list and has grossed over $25 million at the box office. McGraw again achieved critical acclaim for his acting. Shortly before Flicka opened, McGraw received a star on the Hollywood Walk of Fame. His star is located at 6901 Hollywood Boulevard near stars honoring Julie Andrews, William Shatner, and the late Greta Garbo. One of his Flicka co-stars, Alison Lohman, attended the ceremony that included comments from Billy Bob Thornton, McGraw's co-star in the film Friday Night Lights. In addition to acting in Flicka, McGraw served as executive producer of the soundtrack album, which was released by his record label, StyleSonic Records, in association with Curb Records and Fox 2000 films. It featured the closing credit song "My Little Girl", one of the first two songs that McGraw recorded that he also co-wrote (the other being "I've Got Friends That Do", both of which were included on Greatest Hits Vol. 2). The song was nominated by the Broadcast Film Critics for "Best Song" in a film, and the movie was nominated in the category "Best Family Film (Live Action)". The movie proved to be another success in the DVD market, and has sold over a million copies, debuting at No. 3 on the DVD sales chart.

McGraw also had a small part in the Michael Mann–produced 2007 film The Kingdom, reuniting him with Friday Night Lights director Peter Berg. McGraw played a bitter, angered widower whose wife was killed in the terrorist attack that is the centerpiece of the movie. On November 22, 2008, McGraw made his first appearance on Saturday Night Live. He also played "Dallas McVie" in Four Christmases. McGraw appeared in the 2009 film The Blind Side as Sean Tuohy, husband of Sandra Bullock's character, Leigh Anne Tuohy. The Blind Side is based on the true story of Michael Oher, a homeless African-American youngster from a broken home, taken in and adopted by the Tuohys, a well-to-do white family who help him fulfill his potential. He is among the stars of Dirty Girl, a film that premiered on September 12, 2010, at the Toronto Film Festival, along with Juno Temple, Milla Jovovich, William H. Macy and Dwight Yoakam. Also in 2010, McGraw starred in Country Strong as James Canter, the husband and manager of the fictional country singer Kelly Canter (portrayed by Gwyneth Paltrow). In addition to his appearance in the film, McGraw's song "Me and Tennessee", a duet with Paltrow, was played during the closing credits and appears on the film's soundtrack. In 2015, McGraw appeared in Brad Bird's Tomorrowland as Eddie Newton, a NASA engineer, and Casey Newton's (played by Britt Robertson) father.

1883, a spinoff prequel to Taylor Sheridan's Yellowstone television series was released in late 2021 and stars McGraw, Faith Hill, and Sam Elliott. The success of the miniseries led to McGraw's involvement in stunt director Mike Watson's Western feature film, "The Unbelievers," as an actor and producer.

McGraw was set to headline and produce a bull riding drama series for Netflix, until he dropped out as the lead due to back surgery.

== Charitable efforts ==
In 1994, when McGraw first reached fame, he established the annual Swampstock event. It began as a charity softball game to raise money for hometown little league programs; the event now includes a celebrity softball game and a multi-artist concert that attracts over 11,000 fans per year. The combined events have funded new Little League parks and equipment, and have established college scholarship funds for students in the northeast Louisiana area.

From 1996 to 1999, McGraw hosted an annual New Year's Eve concert in Nashville with special guests including Jeff Foxworthy, the Dixie Chicks, and Martina McBride. The 1997 show raised over $100,000 for the Country Music Foundation Hall of Fame and Museum. Beginning in 1999, McGraw would pick select cities on each tour, and the night before he was scheduled to perform, would choose a local club and host a quickly-organized show. This tour-within-a-tour became known as "The Bread and Water Tour", and all proceeds from the show would go to a charity from that community.

McGraw designed a charity T-shirt sold through Angelwear to benefit MusiCares. MusiCares supports musicians in times of need. His charity focuses particularly on health issues. The Tim McGraw Foundation raises funds to enhance the quality of life of children and adults with brain tumors. He supports the Muhammad Ali Parkinson Center, the David Foster Foundation, which helps families of children in need of organ transplants, and Musicians on Call, which brings music to hospital patients' bedsides. He also performs during dinners and auctions to benefit children with disabilities. Hill and McGraw gave the Navy-Marine Corps Relief Society $375,000 (the entire gate receipts from one of their concerts) to assist the families of 17 sailors following the terrorist attack on USS Cole, the guided-missile destroyer that suffered significant damage in the Gulf of Aden, Yemen on October 12, 2000.

In the days immediately following Hurricane Katrina, McGraw who was raised in Mississippi, joined groups taking supplies to Gulfport, Mississippi. The two also hosted several charity concerts to benefit those who were displaced by the storm. Later in the year, the couple established the Neighbor's Keeper Foundation, which provides funding for community charities to assist with basic humanitarian services, in the event of a natural disaster, or for desperate personal circumstances.

McGraw is also a member of the American Red Cross National Celebrity Cabinet, to which various celebrities donate their time, skills, and fame, to help the Red Cross highlight important initiatives and response efforts.

McGraw has helped out with charity events held by Green Bay Packers quarterback Brett Favre. The Brett Favre Fourward Foundation has featured McGraw performing concerts during dinners and auctions that benefit children with disabilities in Wisconsin and Mississippi. One instance is recorded on Favre's official website.

On July 12, 2007, it was made public that McGraw while in Grand Rapids, Michigan for a performance, donated $5,000 to Kailey Kozminski, the 3-year-old daughter of Officer Robert Kozminski, a Grand Rapids police officer who was killed on July 8, 2007, while responding to a domestic disturbance.

In April 2023, McGraw surprised rising country star Brandon Davis, whom he previously brought on tour with him in 2022, with a new guitar after all of his gear was stolen earlier in the month.

== Politics ==
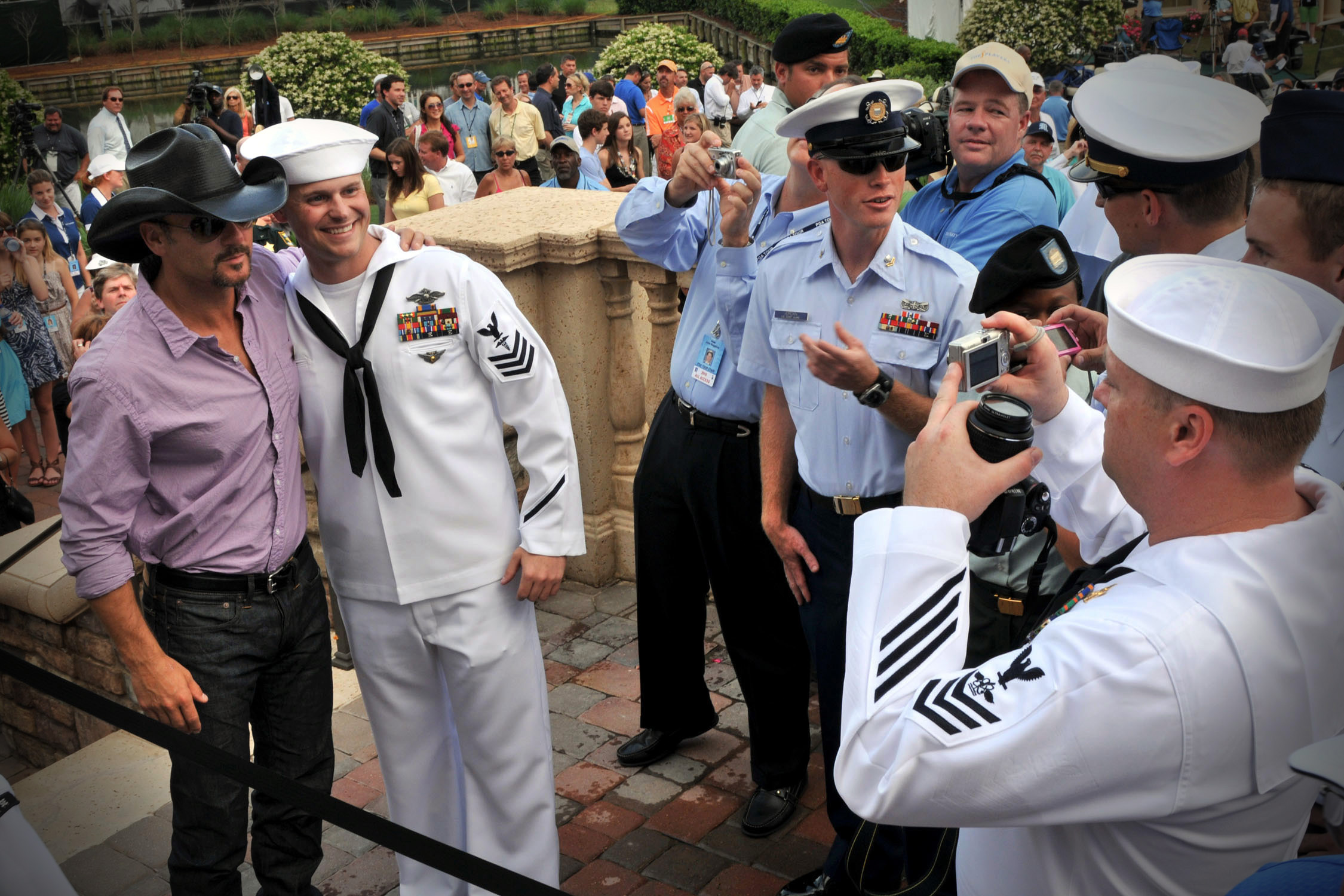
Tim McGraw poses for a sailor at Ponte Vedra Beach, Florida on May 5, 2010, before performing at the Tournament Players Club at Sawgrass military appreciation day.

In a 2006 interview with Esquire magazine, McGraw stated he would like to run for public office as a Democratic Party candidate, possibly for United States Senate or Governor of Tennessee—his home state. In the same interview, he praised Bill Clinton.

In a 2008 interview with People magazine, McGraw referred to himself as a "Blue Dog Democrat" and stated that he and his family support Barack Obama.

In January 2021, McGraw performed on the Celebrating America inaugural special, a primetime virtual concert celebrating the inauguration of Joe Biden.

== Personal life ==
McGraw married fellow country singer Faith Hill in 1996, and they have three daughters.

In 2000, Kenny Chesney and McGraw became involved in a scuffle with police officers in Buffalo, New York, after Chesney was riding a State Police horse and refused to get off the horse. McGraw came to Chesney's aid after police officers nearby believed the horse was being stolen. The two were arrested and charged, Chesney for disorderly conduct and McGraw for assault, but were acquitted in 2001.

McGraw holds a private pilot license and owns a single-engine Cirrus SR22.

In 2015, Forbes estimated McGraw's annual income at $38 million.

McGraw is the godfather to the son of Garrett Hedlund and Emma Roberts. He and Hedlund became friends after co-starring in Friday Night Lights and Country Strong.

In acknowledgment of his grandfather's Italian heritage, McGraw was honored by the National Italian American Foundation (NIAF) in 2004, receiving the NIAF Special Achievement Award in Music during the Foundation's 29th Anniversary Gala.

McGraw's Bracco Italiano named Lepshi won Best of Breed at the 2023 Westminster Kennel Club Dog Show. The McGraw-Hill family also has two other Bracco Italianos, Caesar and Stromboli.

== Discography ==
=== Studio albums ===
- Tim McGraw (1993)
- Not a Moment Too Soon (1994)
- All I Want (1995)
- Everywhere (1997)
- A Place in the Sun (1999)
- Set This Circus Down (2001)
- Tim McGraw and the Dancehall Doctors (2002)
- Live Like You Were Dying (2004)
- Let It Go (2007)
- Southern Voice (2009)
- Emotional Traffic (2012)
- Two Lanes of Freedom (2013)
- Sundown Heaven Town (2014)
- Damn Country Music (2015)
- The Rest of Our Life (with Faith Hill) (2017)
- Here on Earth (2020)
- Standing Room Only (2023)
- Pawn Shop Guitar (2026)

== Tours ==
Headlining

- The Spontaneous Combustion Tour (1996)
- Everywhere Tour (1997)
- The Bread and Water Tour (1999)
- Set This Circus Down Tour (2001)
- Live Like You Were Dying Tour (2004)
- Live Your Voice Tour (2008)
- Southern Voice Tour (2010)
- Emotional Traffic Tour (2011)
- Two Lanes of Freedom Tour (2013)
- Sundown Heaven Town Tour (2014)
- Shotgun Rider Tour (2015)
- McGraw Live Tour (2022)
- Standing Room Only Tour (2024)
- Pawn Shop Guitar Tour (2026)

Co-headlining

- Soul2Soul Tour (2000) (with Faith Hill)
- Soul2Soul II Tour (2006–2007) (with Faith Hill)
- Tim McGraw & Faith Hill Australia 2012 Tour (2012)
- Brothers of the Sun Tour (2012) (with Kenny Chesney)
- Soul2Soul: The World Tour (2017–2018) (with Faith Hill)

== Filmography ==
=== Film ===
Film
Year	Title	Role	Notes
2004	Black Cloud	Sheriff Cliff Powers	
2004	Friday Night Lights	Charles Billingsley	Nominated - MTV Movie Award - Best Male Breakthrough Performance
2006	Flicka	Rob McLaughlin	Nominated - Critics Choice Award for Best Song: "My Little Girl"
2007	The Kingdom	Aaron Jackson	
2008	Four Christmases	Dallas McVie	
2009	The Blind Side	Sean Tuohy	
2010	Dirty Girl	Danny Briggs	
2010	Country Strong	James Canter	
2015	Tomorrowland	Eddie Newton	
2017	The Shack	Willie	
2027	The Rescue	—	Executive producer only

=== Television ===
Television
Year	Title	Role	Notes
1997	The Jeff Foxworthy Show	Lionel	Episode: "Feud for Thought"
2000	Sesame Street	Himself	Episode: "3919"
2008	Saturday Night Live	Host	Episode: "Tim McGraw/Ludacris & T-Pain"
2011	Who Do You Think You Are?	Himself	Episode: "Tim McGraw"
2013	Cake Boss	Himself	Episode: "A Cowboy In Hoboken"
2015	Repeat After Me	Himself	Episode: "1x4"
2016	The Voice	Himself	Advisor (season 11)
2019	Brad Paisley Thinks He's Special	Himself/Guest	Brad Paisley with Special Guests: Darius Rucker, Carrie Underwood, Peyton Manning, Kimberly Williams-Paisley, Kelsea Ballerini, Jonas Brothers
2021	Yellowstone	James Dutton	2 episodes in season 4
2021–2022	1883	James Dutton	10 episodes
2025	The Mighty Nein	Captain Vandran (voice)	

== Awards ==
=== Grammy Awards ===
Year	Nominee / work	Award	Results
1996	"Hope" (Country Music's Quest for a Cure)	Best Country Collaboration with Vocals	Nominated
1997	"It's Your Love" (with Faith Hill)	Best Country Collaboration with Vocals	Nominated
1998	"Just To Hear You Say That You Love Me" (with Faith Hill)	Best Country Collaboration with Vocals	Nominated
1999	"Please Remember Me"	Best Male Country Vocal Performance	Nominated
2000	"My Best Friend"	Best Male Country Vocal Performance	Nominated
2000	"Let's Make Love" (with Faith Hill)	Best Country Collaboration with Vocals	Won
2001	Set This Circus Down	Best Country Album	Nominated
2001	"Grown Men Don't Cry"	Best Male Country Vocal Performance	Nominated
2001	"Bring On the Rain" (with Jo Dee Messina)	Best Country Collaboration with Vocals	Nominated
2003	"She's My Kind of Rain"	Best Male Country Vocal Performance	Nominated
2004	Live Like You Were Dying	Best Country Album	Nominated
2004	"Live Like You Were Dying"	Best Male Country Vocal Performance	Won
2005	"Like We Never Loved At All" (with Faith Hill)	Best Country Collaboration with Vocals	Won
2007	Let It Go	Best Country Album	Nominated
2007	"If You're Reading This"	Best Country Song	Nominated
2007	"If You're Reading This"	Best Male Country Vocal Performance	Nominated
2007	"I Need You" (with Faith Hill)	Best Country Collaboration with Vocals	Nominated
2013	Two Lanes of Freedom	Best Country Album	Nominated
2013	"Highway Don't Care" (with Taylor Swift & Keith Urban)	Best Country Duo/Group Performance	Nominated
2014	"Meanwhile Back at Mama's" (with Faith Hill)	Best Country Duo/Group Performance	Nominated

=== Other awards ===
Year	Awards	Award
1994	Country Music Television	Male Video Artist of the Year
1994	Academy of Country Music	Album of the Year – Not a Moment Too Soon
1994	Academy of Country Music	Top New Male Vocalist
1994	Billboard Awards	Top New Country Artist
1994	Billboard Magazine	Top New Country Album – Not a Moment Too Soon
1995	American Music Awards	Favorite Country New Artist
1997	Billboard Magazine	Single of the Year – "It's Your Love" (with Faith Hill)
1997	Country Music Television	Video of the Year – "It's Your Love" (with Faith Hill)
1997	Country Music Television	Male Artist of the Year
1997	Playgirl Magazine	Top Ten, Sexiest Men of the Year
1997	CMA	Vocal Event – "It's Your Love" (with Faith Hill)
1998	Billboard Awards	Country Single of the Year – "Just to See You Smile"
1998	CMA	Album of the Year – Everywhere
1998	Academy of Country Music	Single of the Year – "It's Your Love" (with Faith Hill)
1998	Academy of Country Music	Song of the Year – "It's Your Love" (with Faith Hill)
1998	Academy of Country Music	Video of the Year – "It's Your Love" (with Faith Hill)
1998	Academy of Country Music	Top Vocal Event – "It's Your Love" (with Faith Hill)
1999	Academy of Country Music	Male Vocalist
1999	Academy of Country Music	Vocal Collaboration – "Just to Hear You Say That You Love Me" (with Faith Hill)
1999	CMA	Male Vocalist
1999	CMA	Album of the Year – A Place in the Sun
2000	CMA	Male Vocalist
2000	National Fatherhood Initiative	Father of the Year
2000	Academy of Country Music	Male Vocalist
2000	Billboard Awards	Male Artist of the Year
2001	American Music Awards	Favorite Male Country Artist
2001	CMA	Entertainer of the Year
2001	Billboard Awards	Country Artist
2001	Billboard Awards	Male Country Artist
2001	Billboard Awards	Country Albums Artist
2001	Billboard Awards	Country Single Artist
2001	Billboard Awards	Country Album – Greatest Hits
2002	American Music Awards	Best Country Album – Set This Circus Down
2002	American Music Awards	Favorite Male Country Artist
2003	American Music Awards (January)	Favorite Country Male Artist
2003	Radio Music Awards (January)	Country Male Artist
2003	American Music Awards (November)	Favorite Country Male Artist
2004	People's Choice Awards	Favorite Country Male Artist
2004	Radio Music Awards	Country Male Artist
2004	CMA	Single of the Year – "Live Like You Were Dying"
2005	American Music Awards	Album of the Year - Live Like You Were Dying
2005	American Music Awards	Best Male Country Artist
2005	Academy of Country Music	Song of the Year - "Live Like You Were Dying"
2005	Academy of Country Music	Single of the Year - "Live Like You Were Dying"
2005	People's Choice Awards	Favorite Country Male Artist
2005	Country Music Television	Most Inspiring Video – "Live Like You Were Dying"
2006	People's Choice Awards	Top Male Performer
2012	CMA	Musical Event of the Year - "Feel Like a Rock Star" (with Kenny Chesney)
2013	British Country Music Association	International Song of the Year - "Highway Don't Care" (with Taylor Swift and Keith Urban)
2014	People's Choice Awards	Country Music Icon
2016	CMT Music Awards	Video Of The Year - "Humble and Kind"
