= 2013 in country music =

This is a list of notable events in country music that took place in 2013.

== Events ==
- January – A brief feud erupts between Blake Shelton and country legend Ray Price when Shelton criticized veteran country performers who don't agree with the direction in which the genre is going, claiming "(n)obody wants to listen to their grandpa's music." Price was offended and publicly expressed his disapproval in a Facebook post, prompting Shelton to issue an apology on Twitter. Several days later, Price accepted the apology. "I agree that he should be given a chance to restore his credibility with the millions of fans who were deeply offended by those hurtful words," Price wrote as part of his Facebook post responding to Shelton's apology.
- January 21 – The first Nash FM-branded station – a media brand and network owned by Cumulus Media – is WNSH (Nash 94.7) in Newark, New Jersey (serving the New York City metropolitan area). The Nash FM brand focuses on current hits (along with scattered recurrents from the past 2–3 years); a year later, a Nash Icon brand will be added, mixing in current hits with songs from the 1980s onward. The first song played on the station is "How Country Feels" by Randy Houser. It becomes the first country music radio station in NYC and NJ since 1996.
- February 17 – Mindy McCready, whose personal and legal problems overshadowed her promising future as a rising female vocalist of the late 1990s, is found dead of an apparent suicide at her home in Heber Springs, Arkansas. Her death came a month after the death of her boyfriend, songwriter David Wilson.
- March 2 – The Country Top 30 with Bobby Bones, a radio show hosted by Austin, Texas, radio personality Bobby Estell (aka Bobby Bones), debuts in syndication.
- April 24 – The Chatham County, Georgia Grand Jury indicted Billy Currington on felony criminal charges of "abuse of an elder person by inflicting mental anguish" and "making terroristic threats". Both criminal charges stem from an April 15 incident involving Charles Harvey Ferrelle, with the indictment alleging that Currington made terrorist threats and drove too close to Ferrelle's boat in a manner that he nearly knocked the elderly man into the water. Currington – released after posting $27,000 bond – faces a prison term of 1 to 5 years if convicted.
- July 7 – Randy Travis is hospitalized in critical condition with viral cardiomyopathy. Four days later, he suffers a stroke and undergoes surgery to relieve pressure on his brain.
- August 10 – With 22 weeks at No. 1, "Cruise" by Florida Georgia Line sets a new record for most weeks at No. 1 on the Billboard Hot Country Songs chart, breaking a three-way tie of 21 weeks at No. 1 jointly held by Eddy Arnold ("I'll Hold You in My Heart (Till I Can Hold You in My Arms)," 1947), Hank Snow ("I'm Movin' On," 1950) and Webb Pierce ("In the Jailhouse Now," 1955). "Cruise" benefited from changes in Billboard's methodology, made in 2012, from a country airplay-only chart to one that reflects all-genre airplay, music downloads and streaming, similarly to the Hot 100. The song had earlier spent five weeks at No. 1 in late December into January, began falling but never dropping out of the top 40, before rebounding in April following the release of a remix with Nelly and eventually reclaiming the chart's No. 1 position.
- August 17- Jim Ed Brown of The Browns celebrates his 50th Grand Ole Opry anniversary
- August 18 – Jody Rosen of New York coins the term "bro-country" to describe the genre's then-ongoing trend of hip-hop influenced country songs with a theme of partying.
- August 23 – In an interview with AARP, Linda Ronstadt reveals she has Parkinson's disease and can no longer sing.
- October 16 – Record producer Tony Brown, best known for producing George Strait, is arrested for domestic assault against his wife.
- November 19 – Carolina country singers Kellie Pickler and Aaron Tippin in a state in United States.
- December 15 – Numerous media outlets, from Rolling Stone to the USA Today, prematurely reported that Ray Price had died from pancreatic cancer. The information came from Price's son, Cliff, who posted via Facebook his father's apparent passing, but it was later retracted, according to The Tennessean (which also published a news story on Price's death that was later removed). Price died the next day, with family spokesman Bill Mack confirming the death.

== Top hits of the year ==
The following songs placed within the Top 20 on the Hot Country Songs, Country Airplay or Canada Country charts in 2013:

=== Singles released by American artists ===
| Songs | Airplay | Canada | Single | Artist | References |
|---|---|---|---|---|---|
| 10 | 14 | 18 | 1994 | Jason Aldean | |
| 24 | 15 | 12 | All Kinds of Kinds | Miranda Lambert | |
| 9 | 3 | 12 | All Over the Road | Easton Corbin | |
| 29 | 17 | — | American Beautiful | The Henningsens | |
| 7 | 1 | 4 | Anywhere with You | Jake Owen | |
| 4 | 3 | 5 | Aw Naw | Chris Young | |
| 9 | 2 | 3 | Beat This Summer | Brad Paisley | |
| 26 | 19 | — | Beer with Jesus | Thomas Rhett | |
| 10 | 3 | 7 | Begin Again | Taylor Swift | |
| 1 | 1 | 1 | Better Dig Two | The Band Perry | |
| 20 | — | — | Born to Fly | Danielle Bradbery | |
| 2 | 1 | 1 | Boys 'Round Here | Blake Shelton featuring Pistol Annies and Friends | |
| 20 | 59 | — | Buzzkill | Luke Bryan | |
| 20 | 16 | — | Can't Shake You | Gloriana | |
| 2 | 1 | 12 | Carolina | Parmalee | |
| 25 | 20 | 43 | Changed | Rascal Flatts | |
| 28 | 13 | 42 | Could It Be | Charlie Worsham | |
| 2 | 1 | 1 | Crash My Party | Luke Bryan | |
| 1 | — | — | Cruise (Remix) | Florida Georgia Line featuring Nelly | |
| 24 | 14 | — | Crying on a Suitcase | Casey James | |
| 16 | — | — | Danny's Song | The Swon Brothers | |
| 19 | 15 | 28 | Days of Gold | Jake Owen | |
| 5 | 1 | 3 | Don't Ya | Brett Eldredge | |
| 8 | 1 | 1 | Done | The Band Perry | |
| 2 | 1 | 1 | Downtown | Lady Antebellum | |
| 28 | 17 | 30 | Drinks After Work | Toby Keith | |
| 3 | 1 | 2 | Drunk Last Night | Eli Young Band | |
| 21 | 17 | 49 | Easy | Sheryl Crow | |
| 1 | 1 | 1 | Every Storm (Runs Out of Rain) | Gary Allan | |
| 18 | 15 | 33 | Everybody's Got Somebody But Me | Hunter Hayes featuring Jason Mraz | |
| 5 | 1 | 1 | Get Your Shine On | Florida Georgia Line | |
| 7 | 2 | 30 | Give It All We Got Tonight | George Strait | |
| 5 | 1 | 1 | Goodbye in Her Eyes | Zac Brown Band | |
| 22 | 11 | 11 | Goodbye Town | Lady Antebellum | |
| 5 | 1 | 18 | Hey Girl | Billy Currington | |
| 8 | 2 | 6 | Hey Pretty Girl | Kip Moore | |
| 4 | 1 | 2 | Highway Don't Care | Tim McGraw with Taylor Swift | |
| 29 | 18 | 40 | Hope on the Rocks | Toby Keith | |
| 6 | 1 | 1 | How Country Feels | Randy Houser | |
| 16 | 4 | 4 | I Can Take It from There | Chris Young | |
| 6 | 1 | 3 | I Drive Your Truck | Lee Brice | |
| 2 | 2 | 1 | I Want Crazy | Hunter Hayes | |
| 7 | 1 | 14 | If I Didn't Have You | Thompson Square | |
| 2 | 1 | 4 | It Goes Like This | Thomas Rhett | |
| 13 | 2 | 3 | Jump Right In | Zac Brown Band | |
| 26 | 16 | — | Let There Be Cowgirls | Chris Cagle | |
| 13 | 6 | 5 | Like Jesus Does | Eric Church | |
| 6 | 1 | 1 | Little Bit of Everything | Keith Urban | |
| 2 | 2 | 1 | Mama's Broken Heart | Miranda Lambert | |
| 14 | 10 | 26 | Merry Go 'Round | Kacey Musgraves | |
| 2 | 1 | 1 | Mine Would Be You | Blake Shelton | |
| 16 | — | — | The Moment I Knew | Taylor Swift | |
| 21 | 7 | 33 | More Than Miles | Brantley Gilbert | |
| 2 | 1 | 1 | Night Train | Jason Aldean | |
| 3 | 1 | 1 | One of Those Nights | Tim McGraw | |
| 5 | 1 | 2 | The Only Way I Know | Jason Aldean with Luke Bryan and Eric Church | |
| 6 | 25 | 37 | The Outsiders | Eric Church | |
| 25 | 15 | — | Outta My Head | Craig Campbell | |
| 11 | 6 | 8 | Parking Lot Party | Lee Brice | |
| 29 | 18 | 34 | Pieces | Gary Allan | |
| 7 | 3 | 6 | Pirate Flag | Kenny Chesney | |
| 10 | 2 | 6 | Point at You | Justin Moore | |
| 14 | 4 | 10 | Radio | Darius Rucker | |
| 2 | 7 | 17 | Red | Taylor Swift | |
| 2 | 3 | 7 | Redneck Crazy | Tyler Farr | |
| 3 | 1 | 1 | Round Here | Florida Georgia Line | |
| 3 | 1 | 1 | Runnin' Outta Moonlight | Randy Houser | |
| 7 | 2 | 2 | See You Again | Carrie Underwood | |
| 29 | 16 | 37 | She Cranks My Tractor | Dustin Lynch | |
| 7 | 1 | 5 | Somebody's Heartbreak | Hunter Hayes | |
| 10 | 2 | 2 | Southern Comfort Zone | Brad Paisley | |
| 4 | 2 | 1 | Southern Girl | Tim McGraw | |
| 4 | 1 | 1 | Sunny and 75 | Joe Nichols | |
| 1 | 1 | 1 | Sure Be Cool If You Did | Blake Shelton | |
| 1 | 2 | 2 | That's My Kind of Night | Luke Bryan | |
| 7 | 1 | 8 | Til My Last Day | Justin Moore | |
| 16 | 5 | — | Tip It On Back | Dierks Bentley | |
| 6 | 2 | 4 | Tornado | Little Big Town | |
| 4 | 2 | 3 | Two Black Cadillacs | Carrie Underwood | |
| 1 | 1 | 1 | Wagon Wheel | Darius Rucker | |
| 1 | 1 | 2 | We Were Us | Keith Urban and Miranda Lambert | |
| 25 | 14 | 14 | When I See This Bar | Kenny Chesney | |

=== Singles released by Canadian artists ===
| Airplay | Canada | Single | Artist | References |
|---|---|---|---|---|
| — | 12 | Anything At All | Autumn Hill | |
| — | 19 | Beer Necessities | Jake Mathews | |
| — | 18 | Blame It on Your Truck | Kira Isabella | |
| — | 1 | Bounty | Dean Brody | |
| — | 8 | Buzz Buzz Buzzing | Tim Hicks | |
| — | 19 | Can't Keep Waiting | Autumn Hill | |
| — | 10 | Crash | Chad Brownlee | |
| — | 9 | Dirt | Dean Brody | |
| — | 9 | Duet | Wes Mack | |
| — | 11 | Farm Girl Strong | Gord Bamford | |
| — | 9 | Get By | Tim Hicks | |
| — | 20 | Half Broke Horses | Jaida Dreyer | |
| — | 9 | Hell Raisin' Good Time | Tim Hicks | |
| — | 16 | Hope and Gasoline | Beverley Mahood | |
| — | 10 | Let It Roll | Emerson Drive with Doc Walker | |
| — | 10 | Living on the Outside | Small Town Pistols | |
| 56 | 13 | Love You for a Long Time | High Valley | |
| — | 19 | Must Be a Woman | Gord Bamford | |
| — | 17 | Never Done It Like This | Steven Lee Olsen | |
| — | 11 | Never Gonna Let You | MacKenzie Porter | |
| — | 6 | Nothing but Summer | Dallas Smith | |
| — | 12 | Put It Into Drive | Doc Walker | |
| — | 13 | Rock It Country Girl | Jason Blaine | |
| — | 17 | She Always Gets What She Wants | Emerson Drive | |
| — | 14 | Slow Dance | George Canyon | |
| — | 9 | Somebody Will | Bobby Wills | |
| — | 11 | Somewhere in the Country | Tebey | |
| — | 13 | Songs About You | Kira Isabella | |
| — | 3 | Started with a Song | Brett Kissel | |
| — | 18 | Suntan City | Aaron Pritchett | |
| — | 10 | Take the Week Off | Deric Ruttan | |
| — | 8 | Till It's Gone | Tebey | |
| — | 12 | Underneath the Apple Trees | Dean Brody | |
| — | 7 | What Kinda Love | Dallas Smith | |
| — | 1 | When Your Lips Are So Close | Gord Bamford | |
| — | 13 | Where the Party At? | Chad Brownlee | |
| — | 11 | Where the Train Don't Stop | Deric Ruttan | |
| — | 12 | With You | Emerson Drive | |

Notes

- "—" denotes releases that did not chart

== Top new album releases ==
The following albums placed within the Top 50 on the Top Country Albums charts in 2013:

| US | Album | Artist | Record label | Release date | Reference |
|---|---|---|---|---|---|
| 2 | A.M. | Chris Young | RCA Nashville | September 17 | |
| 2 | Alabama & Friends | Various Artists | Show Dog-Universal Music | August 27 | |
| 2 | Annie Up | Pistol Annies | RCA Nashville | May 7 | |
| 4 | Bakersfield | Vince Gill and Paul Franklin | MCA Nashville | July 30 | |
| 1 | Based on a True Story... | Blake Shelton | Warner Bros. Nashville | March 26 | |
| 1 | Blame It All on My Roots: Five Decades of Influences | Garth Brooks | Pearl | November 28 | |
| 3 | The Bluegrass Album | Alan Jackson | ACR/EMI Records Nashville | September 24 | |
| 2 | Bring You Back | Brett Eldredge | Atlantic Nashville | August 6 | |
| 10 | Brothers of the 4×4 | Hank 3 | Megaforce/Hank 3 | October 1 | |
| 3 | Caught in the Act: Live | Eric Church | EMI Nashville | April 9 | |
| 1 | Crash My Party | Luke Bryan | Capitol Nashville | August 13 | |
| 3 | Crickets | Joe Nichols | Red Bow | October 8 | |
| 5 | Danielle Bradbery | Danielle Bradbery | Big Machine | November 25 | |
| 4 | Days of Gold | Jake Owen | RCA Nashville | December 3 | |
| 3 | Drinks After Work | Toby Keith | Show Dog-Universal Music | October 29 | |
| 1 | Duck the Halls: A Robertson Family Christmas | The Robertsons | UMG Nashville | October 29 | |
| 7 | Fall Into Me | Katie Armiger | Cold River | January 15 | |
| 10 | Feels Like Carolina | Parmalee | Stoney Creek | December 10 | |
| 3 | Feels Like Home | Sheryl Crow | Warner Bros. Nashville | September 10 | |
| 1 | Frame by Frame | Cassadee Pope | Republic Nashville | October 8 | |
| 1 | Fuse | Keith Urban | Capitol Nashville | September 10 | |
| 1 | Golden | Lady Antebellum | Capitol Nashville | May 7 | |
| 5 | The Grohl Sessions, Vol. 1 (EP) | Zac Brown Band | Southern Ground | December 10 | |
| 3 | How Country Feels | Randy Houser | Stoney Creek | January 22 | |
| 8 | In Time | The Mavericks | Valory Music Group | February 26 | |
| 2 | It Goes Like This | Thomas Rhett | Valory Music Group | October 29 | |
| 4 | Just Feels Good | Thompson Square | Stoney Creek | March 26 | |
| 3 | Keep It Redneck | The Lacs | Backroad | August 20 | |
| 1 | Life on a Rock | Kenny Chesney | Blue Chair/Columbia | April 30 | |
| 10 | Like a Rose | Ashley Monroe | Warner Bros. Nashville | March 5 | |
| 1 | Love Is Everything | George Strait | MCA Nashville | May 14 | |
| 6 | Love Will... | Trace Adkins | Show Dog-Universal Music | May 14 | |
| 8 | Mud Digger 4 | Various Artists | Average Joes | July 2 | |
| 5 | The Music of Nashville: Season 1 Volume 2 | Various Artists | Big Machine | May 7 | |
| 7 | The Music of Nashville: Season 2, Volume 1 | Various Artists | Big Machine | December 10 | |
| 10 | Now That's What I Call a Country Party | Various Artists | Universal | May 7 | |
| 4 | Now That's What I Call Country Volume 6 | Various Artists | Universal | June 11 | |
| 1 | Off the Beaten Path | Justin Moore | Valory Music Group | September 17 | |
| 4 | Old Yellow Moon | Emmylou Harris and Rodney Crowell | Nonesuch | February 26 | |
| 1 | Pioneer | The Band Perry | Republic Nashville | April 2 | |
| 2 | Precious Memories Volume II | Alan Jackson | EMI Nashville | March 26 | |
| 4 | Ready Set Roll (EP) | Chase Rice | Dack Janiels | October 15 | |
| 2 | Redneck Crazy | Tyler Farr | Columbia Nashville | September 30 | |
| 1 | Same Trailer Different Park | Kacey Musgraves | Mercury Nashville | March 19 | |
| 1 | See You Tonight | Scotty McCreery | 19/Interscope/Mercury Nashville | October 15 | |
| 1 | Set You Free | Gary Allan | MCA Nashville | January 22 | |
| 9 | Spitfire | LeAnn Rimes | Curb | June 4 | |
| 1 | Spring Break...Here to Party | Luke Bryan | Capitol Nashville | March 5 | |
| 7 | StandOff | Casey Donahew Band | Almost Country | April 16 | |
| 4 | Tate Stevens | Tate Stevens | RCA Nashville/Syco | April 23 | |
| 2 | To All the Girls... | Willie Nelson | Legacy | October 15 | |
| 3 | Trouble | Randy Rogers Band | MCA Nashville | April 30 | |
| 1 | True Believers | Darius Rucker | Capitol Nashville | May 21 | |
| 1 | Two Lanes of Freedom | Tim McGraw | Big Machine | February 5 | |
| 6 | The Voice: The Complete Season 4 Collection | Danielle Bradbery | Republic Nashville | June 19 | |
| 5 | We Are Tonight | Billy Currington | Mercury Nashville | September 17 | |
| 1 | Wheelhouse | Brad Paisley | Arista Nashville | April 9 | |
| 4 | The Woman I Am | Kellie Pickler | Black River Entertainment | November 11 | |
| 9 | You Can't Make Old Friends | Kenny Rogers | Warner Bros. Nashville | October 8 | |

=== Other top albums ===
| US | Album | Artist | Record label | Release date | Reference |
|---|---|---|---|---|---|
| 33 | 4 Album Collection | Luke Bryan | Capitol Nashville | November 19 | |
| 23 | 12 Stories | Brandy Clark | Slate Creek Records | October 22 | |
| 38 | 40th Anniversary: 1973–2013 | The Oak Ridge Boys | Gaither Music Group | July 30 | |
| 34 | Amazing Grace | George Jones | Bandit | September 10 | |
| 24 | Beggin' for More | Kyle Park | Kyle Park Music | March 19 | |
| 24 | Best from the Farewell Concert | The Statler Brothers | Gaither Music Group | April 23 | |
| 40 | Brothers of the Highway | Dailey & Vincent | Rounder | May 7 | |
| 31 | The Calm After... | Travis Tritt | Post Oak | July 9 | |
| 29 | Cheater's Game | Kelly Willis and Bruce Robison | Spunk | February 12 | |
| 47 | Chris Janson (EP) | Chris Janson | Bigger Picture Music Group | September 3 | |
| 46 | The Classic Christmas Album | Alabama | Legacy | October 8 | |
| 48 | The Classic Christmas Album | Johnny Cash | Legacy | October 8 | |
| 27 | The Classic Christmas Album | Martina McBride | Legacy | October 8 | |
| 38 | Cluck Ol' Hen | Ricky Skaggs and Bruce Hornsby | Skaggs Family | August 20 | |
| 36 | Country: Charlie Daniels | Charlie Daniels | Sony Music | February 26 | |
| 49 | Country: Keith Whitley | Keith Whitley | Sony Music | March 5 | |
| 36 | Cut to Impress | Maggie Rose | RPM Entertainment | March 26 | |
| 25 | Dark & Dirty Mile | Jason Boland & the Stragglers | Proud Souls | May 14 | |
| 15 | Dirt Road Driveway | Granger Smith | Pioneer | April 16 | |
| 32 | Divided & United | Various Artists | ATO | November 5 | |
| 33 | Door Without a Screen | Sundy Best | E1 Entertainment | August 27 | |
| 28 | Feeling Mortal | Kris Kristofferson | KK | January 29 | |
| 30 | Finally Home | Blue Sky Riders | 101 Distribution | January 29 | |
| 36 | Good Wine and Bad Decisions | Julie Roberts | Sun | October 29 | |
| 36 | Greatest Hits Vol. 1: Tribute to Garth Brooks | Country Hits Makers | Country Hits Makers | May 3 | |
| 26 | Headlights, Taillights and Radios | Tracy Lawrence | Lawrence Music Group | August 20 | |
| 39 | High Cotton: A Tribute to Alabama | Various Artists | Lightning Rod | September 17 | |
| 48 | High Life | Charlie Robison | Jetwell | October 1 | |
| 31 | High Top Mountain | Sturgill Simpson | High Top Mountain | June 11 | |
| 18 | The Highway | Holly Williams | Georgiana | February 5 | |
| 43 | Honky Tonk Woman | Georgia Holt | Georgia Holt | April 30 | |
| 32 | I Can't Stop Loving You: The Songs of Don Gibson | Mandy Barnett | Cracker Barrel | November 11 | |
| 48 | Icon | Chris Cagle | Capitol Nashville | March 19 | |
| 19 | Influence Vol. 1: The Man I Am | Randy Travis | Warner Bros. Nashville | October 1 | |
| 27 | Inspired: Songs of Faith & Family | Joey + Rory | Gaither Music Group | July 16 | |
| 12 | The Journey (Livin' Hits) | Craig Morgan | Black River | September 3 | |
| 49 | Justified: Music from the Original Television Series | Various Artists | Madison Gate | January 8 | |
| 41 | Keep It Country | Jason Cassidy | A-Blake | July 16 | |
| 45 | Kicker Town | Rusty Truck | Crosseyed Music | August 6 | |
| 12 | The King's Gift | Trace Adkins | Caliburn | October 29 | |
| 16 | Let's Face the Music and Dance | Willie Nelson | Legacy | April 16 | |
| 33 | Life as We Know It | Lonestar | 4 Star | June 4 | |
| 32 | LIFE Unheard | Johnny Cash | Sony Music | August 13 | |
| 44 | A Little Unprofessional | Ron White | Image | June 4 | |
| 39 | The Living Room Sessions | B. J. Thomas | Wrinkled | April 2 | |
| 25 | LoCash Cowboys | LoCash Cowboys | Average Joes | June 18 | |
| 22 | Long Night Moon | Reckless Kelly | No Big Deal | September 3 | |
| 12 | The Low Highway | Steve Earle | New West | April 16 | |
| 44 | Made to Last | Joey + Rory | Farmhouse Recordings | October 8 | |
| 36 | Memories and Moments | Tim O'Brien and Darrell Scott | Full Light | September 17 | |
| 13 | Merry Christmas... Love, Elvis | Elvis Presley | Sony Music | August 27 | |
| 38 | Move Like That (EP) | Due West | Sovereign 3 | August 27 | |
| 34 | Mud Dynasty | Lenny Cooper | Average Joes | May 7 | |
| 22 | The Muse | The Wood Brothers | Southern Ground | October 1 | |
| 12 | The Music Is You: A Tribute to John Denver | Various Artists | ATO | April 2 | |
| 12 | My Favourite Picture of You | Guy Clark | Dualtone | July 23 | |
| 23 | Never Give In | Will Hoge | Cumberland | October 15 | |
| 27 | Never Regret | Craig Campbell | Bigger Picture Music Group | May 7 | |
| 17 | New Hometown | Connor Christian & Southern Gothic | Rocket Science | February 12 | |
| 11 | Official 2013 Academy of Country Music Awards 'ZinePak | Various Artists | ZinePak LLC/Walmart | March 26 | |
| 20 | Original Good Ol' Boy | JJ Lawhorn | Average Joes | July 16 | |
| 19 | The Other Life | Shooter Jennings | Entertainment One Music | March 12 | |
| 40 | Pain Management | Bubba Sparxxx | Average Joes | October 15 | |
| 28 | Point at You & Four Moore Hits (EP) | Justin Moore | Valory Music Group | April 2 | |
| 45 | Pride: A Tribute to Charley Pride | Neal McCoy | Slate Creek | September 24 | |
| 48 | Red River Drifter | Michael Martin Murphey | Red River | July 9 | |
| 24 | Right On Time | Gretchen Wilson | Redneck | April 2 | |
| 34 | Rose Queen | William Clark Green | Bill Grease | April 30 | |
| 21 | Rough (EP) | Chuck Wicks | Liz Rose Music | April 9 | |
| 12 | Rubberband | Charlie Worsham | Warner Bros. Nashville | August 20 | |
| 43 | Runaway Freeway Blues | The Black Lillies | North Knox | March 26 | |
| 22 | See You There | Glen Campbell | Surfdog | August 13 | |
| 39 | Slower Than Christmas | Mountain Man | IMI | November 11 | |
| 35 | Some Old, Some New, Maybe a Cover or Two | Cody Canada | Underground Sound | November 19 | |
| 11 | Southern Soul | Frank Foster | Frank Foster | September 3 | |
| 42 | The Stand-In | Caitlin Rose | ATO | March 5 | |
| 18 | Tim McGraw & Friends | Tim McGraw | Curb | January 22 | |
| 40 | Under the Covers | Gretchen Wilson | Redneck | June 4 | |
| 18 | The Voice: The Complete Season 4 Collection | The Swon Brothers | Republic Nashville | June 19 | |
| 30 | When I Said I Do | Clint Black | Cracker Barrel | August 5 | |
| 41 | You Should Dream | The Texas Tenors | Select-O-Hits | December 10 | |

== Deaths ==
- January 1 – Patti Page, 85, traditional pop singer who was one of the most successful music artists of the 1950s and best known for her classic country-pop hit, "Tennessee Waltz."
- January 30 – Patty Andrews, 94, last surviving member of vocal pop group The Andrews Sisters who had three top ten country hits in the 1940s.
- February 17 – Mindy McCready, 37, country vocalist from the mid-to-late 1990s, best known for "Guys Do It All the Time" (suicide)
- March 6 – Stompin' Tom Connors, 77, Canadian country singer from the 1970s, best known for "The Hockey Song" (natural causes)
- March 6 – Claude King, 90, singer/songwriter known for his million selling 1962 hit "Wolverton Mountain" (natural causes)
- March 14 – Jack Greene, 83, American country musician nicknamed the "Jolly Green Giant" and well known for his 1966 hit "There Goes My Everything" also for his 1969 hit "Statue of a Fool" (complications from Alzheimer's disease)
- April 16 – Rita MacNeil, 68, Canadian country singer from the 1980s and 1990s (complications from surgery)
- April 26 – George Jones, 81, country music icon from the 1950s onward, best known for hits such as "He Stopped Loving Her Today" and dozens of others. (acute hypoxia, from complications of fever and irregular blood pressure)
- May 24 – Lorene Mann, 76, singer-songwriter best known for her duets with Justin Tubb and Archie Campbell
- June 5 – Don Bowman, 75, original host of radio's American Country Countdown and writer of Waylon Jennings-Willie Nelson duet "Just to Satisfy You."
- June 19 – Slim Whitman, 90, country artist best known for his high-octave falsetto and yodeling abilities, and songs such as "Indian Love Call" and "Rose Marie" (heart failure)
- June 19 – Chet Flippo, 69, journalist for Rolling Stone and Billboard, editorial director at Country Music Television
- July 8 – Johnny MacRae, 84, songwriter best known for "I'd Love to Lay You Down" (heart disease)
- July 29 – Betty Sue Lynn, 64, daughter of Country legend Loretta Lynn and her husband Oliver Lynn, dies of emphysema just outside her mother's ranch in Hurricane Mills, Tennessee. Betty Sue is the second of Lynn's children to die before her.
- August 8 – Jack Clement, 82, songwriter and record producer known for his work with Johnny Cash
- August 10 – Jody Payne, 77, Willie Nelson's longtime guitarist
- August 13 – Tompall Glaser, 79, one-third of Tompall & the Glaser Brothers; also known for the solo single "Put Another Log on the Fire"
- September 17 – Marvin Rainwater, 88, was an American country and rockabilly singer and songwriter who had several hits during the late 1950s, including "Gonna Find Me a Bluebird"
- September 28 – B. B. Watson, 60, best known for his 1991 hit "Light at the End of the Tunnel"
- October 10 – Cal Smith, 81, best known for his 1974 hit "Country Bumpkin"
- October 20 – Leon Ashley, 77, best known for his 1967 hit "Laura (What's He Got That I Ain't Got)"
- October 29 – Sherman Halsey, 56, music video director best known for his work with Tim McGraw
- November 13 – Bob Beckham, 86, singer and music publisher
- November 21 – Nelson Larkin, 70, songwriter and producer
- December 16 – Ray Price, 87, country singer best known for his hits "For the Good Times", "Crazy Arms", "City Lights" and dozens more (pancreatic cancer)

== Hall of Fame Inductees ==
=== Bluegrass Music Hall of Fame ===
- Tony Rice
- Paul Warren

=== Country Music Hall of Fame Inductees ===
- Bobby Bare (born 1935)
- "Cowboy" Jack Clement (1931–2013)
- Kenny Rogers (1938–2020)

=== Canadian Country Music Hall of Fame Inductees ===
- Ed Harris
- Rita MacNeil

== Major awards ==
=== American Country Awards ===
(presented December 10 in Las Vegas)

- Artist of the Year – Luke Bryan
- Male Artist of the Year – Luke Bryan
- Female Artist of the Year – Miranda Lambert
- Group/Duo of the Year – Lady Antebellum
- Touring Artist of the Year – Luke Bryan
- Album of the Year – Based on a True Story..., Blake Shelton
- Breakthrough Artist of the Year – Scotty McCreery
- New Artist of the Year – Florida Georgia Line
- Single of the Year – "Cruise", Florida Georgia Line
- Male Single of the Year – "Sure Be Cool If You Did", Blake Shelton
- Female Single of the Year – "Mama's Broken Heart", Miranda Lambert
- Duo/Group Single of the Year – "Downtown", Lady Antebellum
- Breakthrough Single of the Year – "I Drive Your Truck", Lee Brice
- New Artist Single of the Year – "Cruise", Florida Georgia Line
- Single by a Vocal Collaboration – "Highway Don't Care", Tim McGraw feat. Taylor Swift and Keith Urban
- Music Video of the Year – "Sure Be Cool If You Did", Blake Shelton
- Male Music Video of the Year – "Sure Be Cool If You Did", Blake Shelton
- Female Music Video of the Year – "Blown Away", Carrie Underwood
- Duo/Group Music Video of the Year – "Highway Don't Care", Tim McGraw feat. Taylor Swift and Keith Urban
- New Artist Music Video of the Year – "Cruise", Florida Georgia Line
- Song of the Year – "Highway Don't Care", Tim McGraw feat. Taylor Swift and Keith Urban

=== Academy of Country Music ===
(presented April 6, 2014 in Las Vegas)

- Entertainer of the Year – George Strait
- Top Male Vocalist – Jason Aldean
- Top Female Vocalist – Miranda Lambert
- Top Vocal Group – The Band Perry
- Top Vocal Duo – Florida Georgia Line
- Top New Artist – Justin Moore
- Album of the Year – Same Trailer Different Park, Kacey Musgraves
- Single Record of the Year – "Mama's Broken Heart", Miranda Lambert
- Song of the Year – "I Drive Your Truck", Lee Brice
- Video of the Year – "Highway Don't Care", Tim McGraw feat. Taylor Swift and Keith Urban
- Vocal Event of the Year – "We Were Us", Keith Urban feat. Miranda Lambert

ACM Honors

- Cliffie Stone Pioneer Award – The Judds
- Cliffie Stone Pioneer Award – Keith Whitley
- Crystal Milestone Award – Jason Aldean
- Gene Weed Special Achievement Award – Blake Shelton
- Jim Reeves International Award – Lady Antebellum
- Mae Boren Axton Award – Tommy Wiggins
- Poet's Award – Guy Clark
- Poet's Award – Hank Williams
- Songwriter of the Year – Dallas Davidson

=== Americana Music Honors & Awards ===
- Album of the Year – Old Yellow Moon (Emmylou Harris and Rodney Crowell)
- Artist of the Year – Dwight Yoakam
- Duo/Group of the Year – Emmylou Harris and Rodney Crowell
- Song of the Year – "Birmingham" (Shovels & Rope)
- Emerging Artist of the Year – Shovels & Rope
- Instrumentalist of the Year – Larry Campbell
- Spirit of Americana/Free Speech Award – Stephen Stills
- Lifetime Achievement: Trailblazer – Old Crow Medicine Show
- Lifetime Achievement: Songwriting – Robert Hunter
- Lifetime Achievement: Performance – Dr John
- Lifetime Achievement: Instrumentalist – Duane Eddy
- Lifetime Achievement: Executive – Chris Strachwitz

=== American Music Awards ===
(presented in Los Angeles on November 24, 2013)

- Artist of the Year – Taylor Swift
- Favorite Country Female Artist – Taylor Swift
- Favorite Country Male Artist – Luke Bryan
- Favorite Country Band/Duo/Group – Lady Antebellum
- Favorite Country Album – Red by Taylor Swift

=== ARIA Awards ===
(presented in Sydney on December 1, 2013)

- Best Country Album – Wreck & Ruin (Kasey Chambers and Shane Nicholson)

=== Canadian Country Music Association ===
(presented September 8 in Edmonton)

- Fans' Choice Award – Terri Clark
- Male Artist of the Year – Dean Brody
- Female Artist of the Year – Kira Isabella
- Group or Duo of the Year – The Stellas
- Songwriter(s) of the Year – "Leaning on a Lonesome Song", written by Gord Bamford, Buddy Owens and Ray Stephenson
- Single of the Year – "Leaning on a Lonesome Song", Gord Bamford
- Album of the Year – Is It Friday Yet?, Gord Bamford
- Top Selling Album – Red, Taylor Swift
- Top Selling Canadian Album – Fire It Up, Johnny Reid
- CMT Video of the Year – "Leaning on a Lonesome Song", Gord Bamford
- Rising Star Award – Bobby Wills
- Roots Artist or Group of the Year – Corb Lund
- Interactive Artist of the Year – High Valley

=== Country Music Association ===
(presented November 6 in Nashville)

- Single of the Year – "Cruise", Florida Georgia Line
- Song of the Year – "I Drive Your Truck", Jessi Alexander, Connie Harrington and Jimmy Yeary
- Vocal Group of the Year – Little Big Town
- New Artist of the Year – Kacey Musgraves
- Album of the Year – Based on a True Story..., Blake Shelton
- Musician of the Year – Mac McAnally
- Vocal Duo of the Year – Florida Georgia Line
- Music Video of the Year – "Highway Don't Care", Tim McGraw with Taylor Swift and Keith Urban
- Male Vocalist of the Year – Blake Shelton
- Female Vocalist of the Year – Miranda Lambert
- Musical Event of the Year – "Highway Don't Care", Tim McGraw with Taylor Swift and Keith Urban
- Entertainer of the Year – George Strait
- Pinnacle Award – Taylor Swift

=== CMT Music Awards ===
(presented June 5 in Nashville)

- Video of the Year – "Blown Away", Carrie Underwood
- Male Video of the Year – "Sure Be Cool If You Did", Blake Shelton
- Female Video of the Year – "Mama's Broken Heart", Miranda Lambert
- Group Video of the Year – "Downtown", Lady Antebellum
- Duo Video of the Year – "Cruise", Florida Georgia Line
- Breakthrough Video of the Year – "Cruise", Florida Georgia Line
- Collaborative Video of the Year – "The Only Way I Know", Jason Aldean with Luke Bryan and Eric Church
- Performance of the Year – "Over You", Miranda Lambert from CMT Artists of the Year
- Nationwide Insurance On Your Side Award – Hunter Hayes

=== CMT Artists of the Year ===
(presented December 3 in Nashville)

- Jason Aldean
- Luke Bryan
- Florida Georgia Line
- Hunter Hayes
- Tim McGraw

=== Grammy Awards ===
(presented January 26, 2014 in Los Angeles)

- Best Country Solo Performance – "Wagon Wheel" (Darius Rucker)
- Best Country Duo/Group Performance – "From This Valley" (The Civil Wars)
- Best Country Song – "Merry Go 'Round" (Kacey Musgraves)
- Best Country Album – Same Trailer Different Park (Kacey Musgraves)
- Best Bluegrass Album – The Streets of Baltimore (Del McCoury Band)
- Best Americana Album – Old Yellow Moon (Emmylou Harris and Rodney Crowell)
- Best American Roots Song – "Love Has Come for You" (Edie Brickell, Steve Martin)
- Best Song Written for Visual Media – "Safe & Sound" (Taylor Swift, T Bone Burnett, John Paul White & Joy Williams)

=== Juno Awards ===
(presented March 30, 2014 in Winnipeg)

- Country Album of the Year – Crop Circles, Dean Brody

=== Presidential Medal of Freedom ===
Country Stars who were honored in 2013

Loretta Lynn

== See also ==
- Country Music Association
- Inductees of the Country Music Hall of Fame
