= McGraw Machine Hits: 2013–2019 =

Greatest hits album by Tim McGraw
- Released: November 20, 2020
- Genre: Country
- Length: 50:42
- Label: Big Machine
- Producer: Byron Gallimore, Tim McGraw

Tim McGraw chronology
Here on Earth (2020)	McGraw Machine Hits: 2013–2019 (2020)	Standing Room Only (2023)

McGraw Machine Hits: 2013–2019 is the fifth greatest hits album by American country music artist Tim McGraw. It was released on November 20, 2020, via Big Machine Records.

== Content ==
The album contains several of McGraw's singles released during his first tenure with Big Machine Records. He left the label in 2019 before re-signing in 2021. Included are the singles "Meanwhile Back at Mama's", "Highway Don't Care", and "Humble and Kind". Also included is his collaboration with Florida Georgia Line, their 2016 single "May We All". Two cover songs are also included. These are of The Cars' "Drive" and The Bellamy Brothers' "Redneck Girl". The latter features guest vocals from the band Midland. The song "Nashville Without You" is only included on digital versions of this album.

== Track listing ==
McGraw Machine Hits: 2013–2019 track listing
No.	Title	Writer(s)	Album	Length
1.	"How I'll Always Be"	Chris Janson, Jeremy Stover, Jamie Paulin	Damn Country Music	3:34
2.	"Humble and Kind"	Lori McKenna	Damn Country Music	4:19
3.	"Top of the World"	Jimmy Robbins, Jon Nite, Josh Osborne	Damn Country Music	3:55
4.	"Diamond Rings and Old Barstools" (with Catherine Dunn)	Jonathan Singleton, Barry Dean, Luke Laird	Sundown Heaven Town	3:17
5.	"Shotgun Rider"	Marv Green, Troy Verges, Hillary Lindsey	Sundown Heaven Town	3:56
6.	"Meanwhile Back at Mama's" (with Faith Hill)	Jeffrey Steele, Jaren Johnston, Tom Douglas	Sundown Heaven Town	3:48
7.	"Southern Girl"	Johnston, Lee Thomas Miller, Rodney Clawson	Two Lanes of Freedom	4:15
8.	"Highway Don't Care" (with Taylor Swift and Keith Urban)	Brad Warren, Brett Warren, Josh Kear, Mark Irwin	Two Lanes of Freedom	4:38
9.	"One of Those Nights"	Chris Tompkins, Clawson, Laird	Two Lanes of Freedom	3:57
10.	"Truck Yeah"	Preston Brust, Chris Lucas, Janson, Danny Myrick	Two Lanes of Freedom	3:28
11.	"Drive"	Ric Ocasek	Previously unreleased	4:00
12.	"May We All" (with Florida Georgia Line)	Jamie Moore, Clawson	Dig Your Roots	3:47
13.	"Redneck Girl" (with Midland)	David Bellamy	Previously unreleased	3:45
Total length:				50:42

Digital version
No.	Title	Writer(s)	Album	Length
6.	"Nashville Without You"	Kyle Jacobs, Joe Leathers, Ruston Kelly	Two Lanes of Freedom	3:37
Total length:				54:18

== Chart performance ==
Chart performance for McGraw Machine Hits: 2013–2019
Chart (2020)	Peak position
US Top Country Albums (Billboard)	42
