= Sundown Heaven Town Tour =

2014 concert tour by Tim McGraw

- Tour by Tim McGraw
- Promotional poster for the tour
- Associated album: Sundown Heaven Town
- Start date: May 9, 2014
- End date: November 8, 2014
- Legs: 1
- No. of shows: 48 in North America

Tim McGraw concert chronology
- Two Lanes of Freedom Tour (2013); Sundown Heaven Town Tour (2014); Shotgun Rider Tour (2015)

The Sundown Heaven Town Tour was the tenth headlining concert tour by American country music artist, Tim McGraw. The tour was in support of his thirteenth studio album, Sundown Heaven Town (2014). It began on May 9, 2014, and finished on November 8, 2014.

== Background ==
McGraw announced his forthcoming studio album and tour in January 2014. It will mark his first venture with Big Machine Records. In the release, he stated the album was set to be released in September 2014; however, the tour would begin May 2014. McGraw stated he was excited to perform new material, with four to five new songs appearing in the set list. Plans to expand the tour once the album is released are under consideration. Along the way, McGraw and wife (Faith Hill) opened for country music artist George Strait. They performed at the Gilette Stadium in Foxborough, Massachusetts. The concert was one of the last of Strait's career.

== Concert synopsis ==
At most amphitheaters the show begins with Tim walking in from the rear of the reserved seats to the stage where he then sings his hit song One of Those Nights.

== Setlist ==
The following setlist is obtained from the concert held on May 10, 2014, at the Shoreline Amphitheatre in Mountain View, California. It does not represent all shows during the tour.

1. "One of Those Nights"
2. "Real Good Man"
3. "I Like It, I Love It"
4. "Southern Voice"
5. "Red Rag Top"
6. "Mexicoma"
7. "Down on the Farm"
8. "Southern Girl"
9. "Just to See You Smile"
10. "Better Than I Used to Be"
11. "Lookin' for That Girl"
12. "Please Remember Me"
13. "Back When"
14. "Keep on Truckin'"
15. "Meanwhile Back at Mama's"
16. "You Are So Beautiful"
17. "The View"
18. "Highway Don't Care"
19. "City Lights"
20. "Where the Green Grass Grows"
21. "Two Lanes of Freedom"
22. "Indian Outlaw"

Encore

23. "The Cowboy in Me"
24. "Truck Yeah"
25. "Something Like That"
26. "Felt Good on My Lips"
27. "Live Like You Were Dying"

== Tour dates ==
Date	City	Country	Venue	Opening acts
North America
May 8, 2014	Fresno	United States	Save Mart Center	Kip Moore; Cassadee Pope
May 9, 2014	Wheatland	United States	Sleep Train Amphitheatre	Kip Moore; Cassadee Pope
May 10, 2014	Mountain View	United States	Shoreline Amphitheatre	Kip Moore; Cassadee Pope
May 16, 2014	Phoenix	United States	Ak-Chin Pavilion	Kip Moore; Cassadee Pope
May 17, 2014	Chula Vista	United States	Sleep Train Amphitheatre	Kip Moore; Cassadee Pope
May 18, 2014	Irvine	United States	Verizon Wireless Amphitheatre	Kip Moore; Cassadee Pope
May 24, 2014^{[A]}	Austin	United States	Austin360 Amphitheater	Kip Moore; Cassadee Pope
May 29, 2014	Bangor	United States	Darling's Waterfront Pavilion	Kip Moore; Cassadee Pope
May 30, 2014	Hopewell	United States	CMAC Performing Arts Center	Kip Moore; Cassadee Pope
June 5, 2014	Nashville	United States	CMA Music Festival	—
June 6, 2014	Burgettstown	United States	First Niagara Pavilion	Kip Moore; Cassadee Pope
June 7, 2014	Noblesville	United States	Klipsch Music Center	Kip Moore; Cassadee Pope
June 8, 2014	Cuyahoga Falls	United States	Blossom Music Center	Kip Moore; Cassadee Pope
June 13, 2014	Hartford	United States	Xfinity Theatre	Kip Moore; Cassadee Pope
June 14, 2014	Bristow	United States	Jiffy Lube Live	Kip Moore; Cassadee Pope
June 15, 2014	Camden	United States	Susquehanna Bank Center	Kip Moore; Cassadee Pope
June 20, 2014	Virginia Beach	United States	Farm Bureau Live	Kip Moore; Cassadee Pope
June 21, 2014	Charlotte	United States	PNC Music Pavilion	Kip Moore; Cassadee Pope
June 22, 2014	Raleigh	United States	Walnut Creek Amphitheatre	Kip Moore; Cassadee Pope
June 26, 2014	Choctaw	United States	Silver Star Convention Center	Kip Moore; Cassadee Pope
June 27, 2014	Tinley Park	United States	First Midwest Bank Amphitheatre	Kip Moore; Cassadee Pope
June 28, 2014	Maryland Heights	United States	Verizon Wireless Amphitheater	Kip Moore; Cassadee Pope
June 29, 2014	Cincinnati	United States	Riverbend Music Center	Kip Moore; Cassadee Pope
July 11, 2014	West Palm Beach	United States	Cruzan Amphitheatre	Kip Moore; Cassadee Pope
July 12, 2014	Tampa	United States	MidFlorida Credit Union Amphitheatre	Kip Moore; Cassadee Pope
July 13, 2014	Atlanta	United States	Aaron's Amphitheatre	Kip Moore; Cassadee Pope
July 18, 2014^{[B]}	Cambridge Township	United States	Michigan International Speedway	Kip Moore; Cassadee Pope
July 19, 2014^{[C]}	Belmont	United States	Jamboree in the Hills	Kip Moore; Cassadee Pope
July 20, 2014	Toronto	Canada	Molson Canadian Amphitheatre	Kip Moore; Cassadee Pope
July 22, 2014^{[D]}	Edmonton	Canada	Rexall Place	Kip Moore; Cassadee Pope
July 25, 2014	West Valley City	United States	USANA Amphitheatre	Kip Moore; Cassadee Pope
July 26, 2014^{[E]}	Cheyenne	United States	Cheyenne Frontier Days Arena	Kip Moore; Cassadee Pope
July 27, 2014	Albuquerque	United States	Isleta Amphitheater	Kip Moore; Cassadee Pope
July 29, 2014	Billings	United States	Rimrock Auto Arena	Kip Moore; Cassadee Pope
July 30, 2014^{[F]}	Airway Heights	United States	Northern Quest Outdoor Concert Venue	Kip Moore; Cassadee Pope
August 1, 2014^{[G]}	George	United States	The Gorge Amphitheatre	Kip Moore; Cassadee Pope
August 2, 2014^{[H]}	Sweet Home	United States	Sankey Park	Kip Moore; Cassadee Pope
August 3, 2014^{[I]}	Duncan	Canada	Cowichan Exhibition Fairgrounds	Kip Moore; Cassadee Pope
August 7, 2014	Rogers	United States	Arkansas Music Pavilion	Kip Moore; Cassadee Pope
August 8, 2014^{[J]}	Dallas	United States	Gexa Energy Pavilion	Kip Moore; Cassadee Pope
August 9, 2014	The Woodlands	United States	Cynthia Woods Mitchell Pavilion	Kip Moore; Cassadee Pope
August 22, 2014	St. John's	Canada	Mile One Centre	Kip Moore; Cassadee Pope
August 23, 2014	St. John's	Canada	Mile One Centre	Kip Moore; Cassadee Pope
August 24, 2014	St. John's	Canada	Mile One Centre	Kip Moore; Cassadee Pope
August 27, 2014^{[K]}	Falcon Heights	United States	Minnesota State Fairgrounds Grandstand	Jana Kramer; Joel Crouse
August 29, 2014^{[L]}	Allentown	United States	Great Allentown Fair	Jana Kramer; Joel Crouse
August 30, 2014^{[M]}	Thornville	United States	Legend Valley	Jana Kramer; Joel Crouse
August 31, 2014	Cherokee	United States	The Event Center at Harrah's Cherokee	Jana Kramer; Joel Crouse
September 12, 2014^{[N]}	Normal	United States	The Corn Crib	Jana Kramer; Joel Crouse
November 8, 2014	Laughlin	United States	Laughlin Event Center	Jana Kramer; Joel Crouse

Festivals and other miscellaneous performances

^{A} Redfest
^{B} Faster Horses Festival
^{C} Jamboree in the Hills
^{D} K-Days
^{E} Cheyenne Frontier Nights
^{F} Pepsi Outdoor Summer Concerts
^{G} Watershed Music Festival
^{H} Oregon Jamboree
^{I} Sunfest Music Festival
^{J} Sneak-Away Sunday Nights
^{K} Minnesota State Fair
^{L} Great Allentown Fair
^{M} Woodystock
^{N} DuPont/Pioneer Summer Concert Series

== Band ==
- Musical director: Denny Heminson
- Banjo: Bob Minner
- Drum: Shawn Fichter
- Fiddle: Deano Brown
- Acoustic guitar: Bob Minner
- Bass guitar: Paul Bushnell
- Electric guitar: Denny Hemingson, David Levita and Adam Shoenfeld
- Steel guitar: Denny Hemingson
- Keyboards: Billy Nobel
- Piano: Deano Brown
- Supporting vocals: Deano Brown, Paul Bushnell and Billy Nobel
