= Tim McGraw albums discography =

Tim McGraw discography
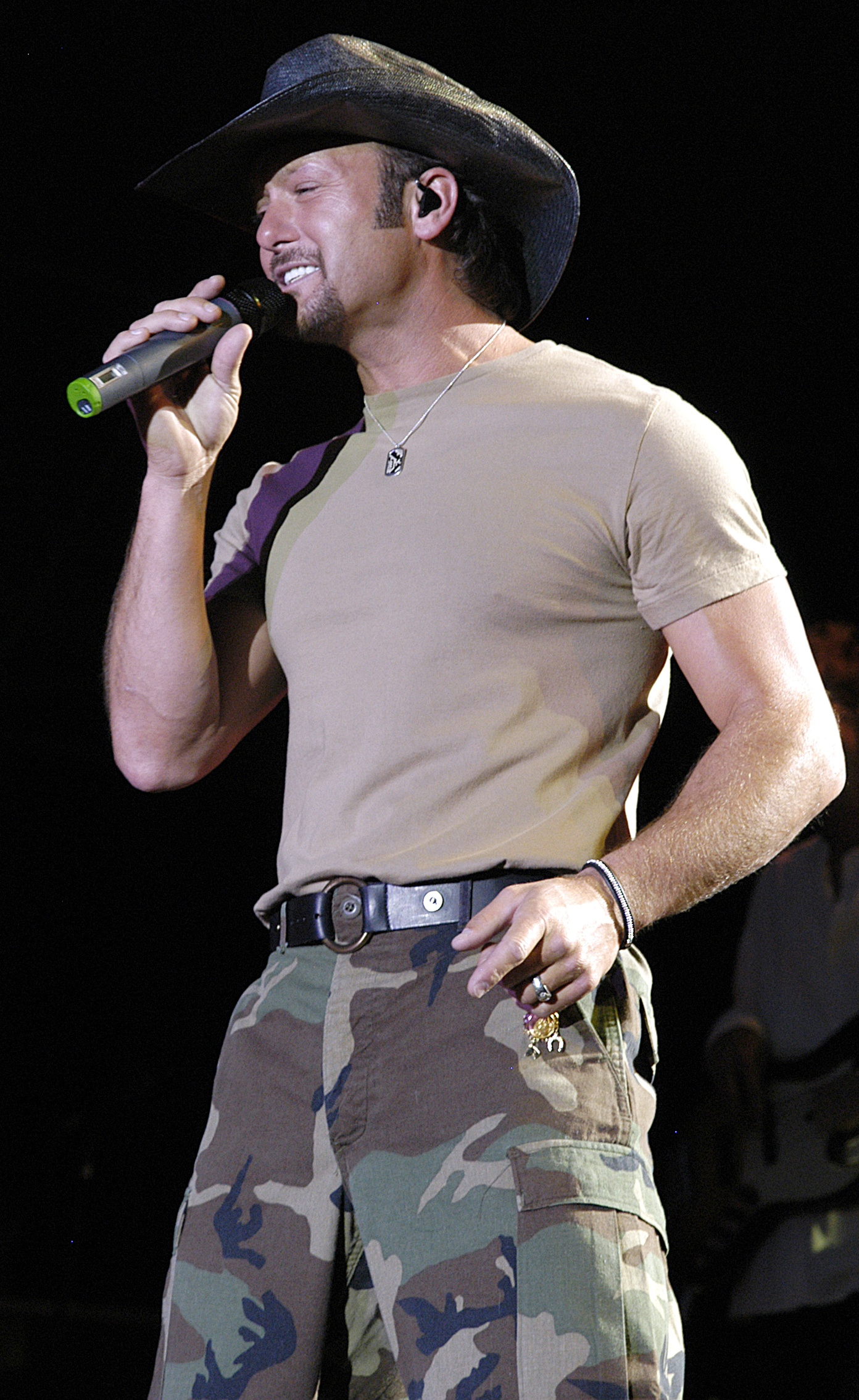
- McGraw performing in 2003
- Studio albums: 17
- EPs: 1
- Compilation albums: 13

American singer and songwriter Tim McGraw has had seventeen studio albums, one extended play and thirteen compilation albums. His highest-certified albums are 1994's Not a Moment Too Soon and 2000's Greatest Hits, at 6× Platinum certification each. Twelve of his 15 studio albums have also reached number one on the Billboard Top Country Albums chart. He has sold over 40 million albums in the US as of October 2011.

== Studio albums ==
=== 1990s ===
List of studio albums released in the 1990s decade, with selected chart positions, sales and certifications
Title	Details	Peak chart positions						Sales	Certifications
Title	Details	US	US Country	CAN	CAN Country	AUS	UK	Sales	Certifications
Tim McGraw	Released: April 20, 1993; Label: Curb; Format: CD, cassette	—	—	—	—	—	—		
Not a Moment Too Soon	Released: March 22, 1994; Label: Curb; Format: CD, cassette	1	1	29	1	78	—		RIAA: 6× Platinum; MC: 2× Platinum
All I Want	Released: September 19, 1995; Label: Curb; Format: CD, cassette	4	1	58	1	125	—		RIAA: 3× Platinum; MC: Platinum
Everywhere	Released: June 3, 1997; Label: Curb; Format: CD, LP, cassette	2	1	8	1	40	—		RIAA: 5× Platinum; MC: 2× Platinum
A Place in the Sun	Released: May 4, 1999; Label: Curb; Format: CD, cassette	1	1	12	2	84	180	US: 3,000,000	RIAA: 4× Platinum; MC: Platinum
"—" denotes releases that did not chart.

=== 2000s ===
List of studio albums released in the 2000s decade, with selected chart positions, sales and certifications
Title	Details	Peak chart positions				Sales	Certifications
Title	Details	US	US Country	CAN	AUS	Sales	Certifications
Set This Circus Down	Released: April 24, 2001; Label: Curb; Format: CD, digital download	2	1	14	95		RIAA: 3× Platinum; MC: Platinum
Tim McGraw and the Dancehall Doctors	Released: November 26, 2002; Label: Curb; Format: CD, digital download	2	2	—	74	US: 602,000	RIAA: 3× Platinum; MC: Platinum
Live Like You Were Dying	Released: August 24, 2004; Label: Curb; Format: CD, digital download	1	1	2	36	US: 766,000	RIAA: 4× Platinum; MC: Platinum
Let It Go	Released: March 27, 2007; Label: Curb; Format: CD, digital download	1	1	1	49	US: 325,000	RIAA: Platinum; MC: Gold
Southern Voice	Released: October 20, 2009; Label: Curb; Format: CD, digital download	2	1	7	12	US: 705,000	RIAA: Gold; MC: Gold
"—" denotes releases that did not chart.

=== 2010s ===
List of studio albums released in the 2010s decade, with selected chart positions, sales and certifications
Title	Details	Peak chart positions								Sales	Certifications
Title	Details	US	US Country	CAN	AUS	AUS Country	SCO	UK	UK Country	Sales	Certifications
Emotional Traffic	Released: January 24, 2012; Label: Curb; Format: CD, digital download	2	1	7	14	—	—	—	2	US: 201,000	
Two Lanes of Freedom	Released: February 5, 2013; Label: Big Machine; Format: CD, LP, digital download	2	1	4	10	—	39	43	1	US: 498,000	RIAA: Gold; MC: Gold
Sundown Heaven Town	Released: September 16, 2014; Label: Big Machine; Format: CD, LP, digital download	3	1	3	11	—	53	72	1	US: 299,000; CAN: 5,500	
Damn Country Music	Released: November 6, 2015; Label: Big Machine; Format: CD, LP, digital download	5	3	11	19	1	87	127	3	US: 255,800	RIAA: Gold; MC: Gold
The Rest of Our Life (with Faith Hill)	Released: November 17, 2017; Label: Arista Nashville; Format: CD, digital download	2	1	2	9	1	34	80	2	US: 231,300	
"—" denotes releases that did not chart.

=== 2020s ===
List of studio albums released in the 2020s decade, with selected chart positions
Title	Details	Peak chart positions						
Title	Details	US	US Country	CAN	AUS	AUS Country	SCO	UK Country
Here on Earth	Released: August 21, 2020; Label: Big Machine; Format: CD, digital download, streaming	14	1	37	10	1	34	4
Standing Room Only	Released: August 25, 2023; Label: Big Machine; Format: CD, LP, digital download, streaming	75	17	—	99	13	35	4
Pawn Shop Guitar	Released: 2026; Label: Big Machine; Format: CD, LP, digital download, streaming	To be released						

== Compilation albums ==
List of compilation albums, with selected chart positions, sales and certifications
Title	Details	Peak chart positions					Sales	Certifications
Title	Details	US	US Country	CAN	AUS	UK Country	Sales	Certifications
Greatest Hits	Released: November 21, 2000; Label: Curb; Format: CD, digital download	4	1	—	87	—		RIAA: 6× Platinum; MC: 2× Platinum
Reflected: Greatest Hits Vol. 2	Release date: March 28, 2006; Label: Curb; Format: CD, digital download	2	1	3	69	—		RIAA: 2× Platinum; MC: Platinum
Greatest Hits: Limited Edition	Released: April 29, 2008; Label: Curb; Format: CD, digital download	10	1	—	—	—		
Collector's Edition	Released: May 6, 2008; Label: Curb; Format: CD, digital download	—	70	—	—	—		
Greatest Hits 3	Released: October 7, 2008; Label: Curb; Format: CD, digital download	9	1	—	—	—		RIAA: Gold
Limited Edition: Greatest Hits Volumes 1, 2 & 3	Released: October 7, 2008; Label: Curb; Format: CD, digital download	—	38	—	19	—		
Number One Hits	Released: November 30, 2010; Label: Curb; Format: CD, digital download	27	6	99	72	1		RIAA: 2× Platinum
Tim McGraw & Friends	Released: January 22, 2013; Label: Curb; Format: CD, digital download	126	18	—	—	3		
Love Story	Released: February 4, 2014; Label: Curb; Format: CD, digital download	116	19	—	77	—		
35 Biggest Hits	Released: June 16, 2015; Label: Curb; Format: CD, digital download	47	8	—	32	—		
McGraw: The Ultimate Collection	Released: October 21, 2016; Label: Curb; Format: CD, digital download	—	50	—	—	—		
The Biggest Hits of Tim McGraw	Released: June 15, 2018; Label: Curb; Format: CD, digital download	—	29	—	—	—	US: 36,600	
McGraw Machine Hits: 2013-2019	Released: November 20, 2020; Label: Big Machine; Format: CD, digital download	—	42	—	—	—		
"—" denotes releases that did not chart

== Extended plays ==
List of extended plays, with selected details
Title	Details
Poet's Resumé	Released: November 21, 2023; Label: Big Machine; Format: Digital download
