= Compass (Lady Antebellum song) =

Single by Lady Antebellum

from the album Golden
- Released: October 14, 2013
- Recorded: 2013
- Genre: Country folk
- Length: 3:04
- Label: Capitol Nashville
- Songwriter(s): Mikkel Eriksen; Tor Erik Hemransen; Ammar Malik; Ross Golan; Daniel Omelio; Emile Haynie
- Producer(s): Nathan Chapman; Lady Antebellum

Lady Antebellum singles chronology
"Goodbye Town" (2013)	"Compass" (2013)	"Bartender" (2014)

"Compass" is a song recorded by American country music group Lady Antebellum. The song was written by members of the pop/R&B production team Stargate, and was produced by Nathan Chapman and Lady Antebellum. It was released as the third overall single from the group's fifth studio album, Golden, on October 1, 2013 by Capitol Records Nashville, and is included on the deluxe edition re-issue of the album, and it features lead vocals from both Scott and Kelley.

In 2015, the song was used in the E3 world reveal trailer for the upcoming 2016 theme park simulation video game "Planet Coaster", which is being developed by Frontier Developments.

== Background and composition ==
After the May 2013 release of Golden, Lady A took a short break before returning to the studio to continue working on new music, rather than immediately going on tour to promote the album. The band came across the song "Compass" and felt so passionate about it that, despite not having a project to record it for and it coming from outside their Nashville comfort zone, they decided to record. "From the minute we first heard it," group member Hillary Scott explained to Billboard, "we believed in the message and the overall feel of the song. We knew we could put our own little overall spin on it. We had to have the fans hear it – immediately." Scott also elaborated on the sonic departure of the song from the group's previous recordings, stating that the prevalent banjo and fiddle in "Compass" were missing from their repertoire and country music as a whole, and credited the song with "reinvigorating" the band creatively and inspiring them to pursue new musical directions.

"Compass" is an uptempo song influenced by country music, folk music and bluegrass. It is composed in the key of C major, and features banjo and mandolin prominently.

== Critical reception ==
Matt Bjorke of Roughstock described "Compass" as an "easily likable song" unlike anything else on country radio, with some of the best lyrics in recent country music releases and an "infectious, percussive and melodic melody". He also noted its potential to be the group's biggest crossover hit since "Need You Now". Taste of Country compared the bluegrass-inspired sound of the song to the music of Mumford and Sons, while praising "Compass" for being a "burst of positive energy... that relies on traditional country instruments" and suggested that the song could pave the way for bluegrass music's acceptance into the mainstream.

== Music video ==
The music video was directed by Peter Zavadil and premiered in December 2013.

== Chart performance ==
The song has sold 546,000 copies in the US as of April 2014.

Chart (2013–2014)	Peak position
Canada (Canadian Hot 100)	51
Canada Country (Billboard)	2
US Billboard Hot 100	46
US Country Airplay (Billboard)	1
US Hot Country Songs (Billboard)	6

=== Year-end charts ===
Chart (2014)	Position
US Country Airplay (Billboard)	35
US Hot Country Songs (Billboard)	41

== Certifications ==
Region	Certification	Certified units/sales
Canada (Music Canada)	Gold	40,000^{*}
United States (RIAA)	Gold	500,000^{‡}
^{*} Sales figures based on certification alone.^{‡} Sales+streaming figures based on certification alone.

== Release history ==
Country	Date	Format
Canada	October 1, 2013	Digital download
United States	October 1, 2013	Digital download
United States	October 14, 2013	Radio airplay
