= Make or Break Me =

Studio album by Kyle Park
- Released: September 20, 2011
- Genre: Texas country
- Length: 54:48
- Label: Winding Road Music
- Producer: Kyle Park

Kyle Park chronology
Fall EP (2010)	Make or Break Me (2011)	Beggin' for More (2013)

Professional ratings
Review scores
Source	Rating
Allmusic	link
Vintage Guitar	Positive

Make or Break Me is a country music album released by singer-songwriter Kyle Park. It was described as a "mixture of up-tempo, guitar-driven honky-tonkers and heartfelt ballads." By November 16, 2011, the album's main single "Make Or Break Me" had climbed to No. 3 on the Texas Music Chart, jumping from number 8 in less than a week.

== Production history ==
Make Or Break Me was recorded on December 1, 2009 and released on September 20, 2011 on Winding Road Music. It includes nine tracks from his previous two EPs, and six new original tracks. All tracks were written or co-written by Park, and he also produced the album himself. He made a music video for "Make Or Break Me," shot at New Braunfels' Whitewater Amphitheater in Austin.

According to Park, "The album is definitely a country and rock record with some other elements. I don’t think it’s a honky-tonk or Texas country record either. It’s more of a mainstream type record, which is what I wanted. I want to play this record all around the world, and not just in one specific location or for one musical demographic."

== Chart history ==
By November 16, 2011, the album's main single "Make Or Break Me" had climbed to No. 3 on the Texas Music Chart, jumping from number 8 in less than a week. It sat in the top 10 for over six weeks, and by December 12, 2011, it was still at No. 7. The single reached the top ten of the Texas Regional Radio Report. By February 6, 2012, both "Make Or Break Me" and the track "Leaving Stephenville" had charted in the TexNet 50 Internet Chart.

== Reviews ==
The album was given 3/5 stars by Allmusic, who reviewed saying "Park's crack band plays tight arrangements in a variety of styles, ranging from traditional country and western swing to Tom Petty-style midtempo rockers with electric guitar solos. Park sings in an ingratiating tenor, and his musical persona is equally pleasing, especially, it would seem, to his female listeners."

It was described as a "mixture of up-tempo, guitar-driven honky-tonkers and heartfelt ballads."

Vintage Guitar Magazine wrote "Loads of great guitar work here, including Lloyd Maines' pedal steel on "I'm Missing You" and John Carroll's power country licks on the title tun. Prove It To You shows Park to be an ace picker, too. He's a good songwriter, likely to get only better with time."

Red Dirt Report wrote "His vocals are warm, with a John Denver-like wistfulness to them. Park is one of those Texas guys whose smart, soulful and personal songs are finding wide appeal. Plus, he’s constantly touring and when you talk to him in person, he’s as friendly and down-to-earth as they come...Texas Country/Red Dirt fans will definitely enjoy it and more mainstream country folks are bound to be enchanted by his voice and music. I certainly am."

== Track listing ==
All songs written by Kyle Park; co-writers in parentheses.

1. "Make or Break Me" (Ryan Beaver) – 3:47
2. "Prove It to You" (Geoffrey Hill) – 3:25
3. "Mistakes I'll Regret" (George Ducas) – 3:01
4. "The Heart of You" – 3:28
5. "I Love Her for a Million Reasons" (Hill) – 3:48
6. "All Night" – 3:42
7. "Any Day or Night" – 4:20
8. "I'm Missing You" – 4:05
9. "Leavin' Stephenville" Ryan Beaver)—3:28
10. "What You'll Never Know" – 3:26
11. "Just a Fake Smile" – 3:19
12. "Brokenhearted" – 3:06
13. "I Think You're in Love" – 3:49
14. "Whatever It Takes" – 4:34
15. "Overboard (It's Over)" – 3:30

== Personnel ==
- Will Armstrong – drums, percussion
- John Carroll – baritone guitar, electric guitar
- Tommy Detamore – pedal steel guitar
- Larry Franklin – fiddle
- Glenn Fukunaga – bass guitar
- Wes Hightower – background vocals
- Eric Lenington – bass guitar
- Lloyd Maines – pedal steel guitar
- Hayden Nicholas – acoustic guitar, baritone guitar, electric guitar
- Kyle Park – acoustic guitar, baritone guitar, electric guitar, nylon string guitar, lead vocals
- Jason Roberts – fiddle, mandolin
- Karl Schwoch – electric guitar
- John Michael Whitby – Hammond B-3 organ, piano, Wurlitzer

== Chart performance ==
Chart (2011)	Peak position
U.S. Billboard Top Country Albums	53
U.S. Billboard Top Heatseekers	15
