= On This Winter's Night =

Studio album by Lady Antebellum
- Released: October 22, 2012
- Recorded: Summer 2011, Summer 2012
- Genre: Christmas; country
- Length: 41:10
- Label: Capitol Nashville
- Producer: Paul Worley

Lady Antebellum chronology
| Own the Night (2011) | On This Winter's Night (2012) | Golden (2013) |

On This Winter's Night is the fourth studio album and first Christmas album by American country music trio Lady Antebellum. It was released on October 22, 2012, by Capitol Records Nashville. The production on the album was handled by the group's longtime producer Paul Worley. This album includes the six tracks from their previous 2010 Christmas EP A Merry Little Christmas as noted below.

A music video was produced for "A Holly Jolly Christmas". On October 26, 2020, the group announced the release of a deluxe edition with four new tracks under their new name of Lady A.

== Commercial performance ==
On This Winter's Night debuted at number nine on the US Billboard 200 chart, selling 25,000 copies in its first week. This became Lady Antebellum's fourth US top-ten debut. In its sixth week, the album returned to the top-ten, reaching a new peak at number eight selling 59,000 copies. On December 13, 2012, the album was certified gold by the Recording Industry Association of America (RIAA) for shipments of over 500,000 copies in the US. As of November 2017, the album has sold 648,500 copies in the United States.

== Track listing ==
| No. | Title | Writer(s) | Length |
|---|---|---|---|
| 1. | "A Holly Jolly Christmas" | Johnny Marks | 2:03 |
| 2. | "Christmas (Baby Please Come Home)" | Jeff Barry; Ellie Greenwich; Phil Spector | 3:09 |
| 3. | "All I Want for Christmas Is You" | Mariah Carey; Walter Afanasieff | 3:35 |
| 4. | "I'll Be Home for Christmas" | Kim Gannon; Walter Kent; Buck Ram | 3:20 |
| 5. | "This Christmas" | Nadine McKinnor; Donny Pitts | 3:19 |
| 6. | "The First Noël" | Traditional, arr.; Hillary Scott; Charles Kelley; Dave Haywood | 3:23 |
| 7. | "On This Winter’s Night" | Scott; Kelley; Haywood; Tom Douglas | 4:01 |
| 8. | "Let It Snow! Let It Snow! Let It Snow!" | Sammy Cahn; Jule Styne | 2:33 |
| 9. | "Have Yourself a Merry Little Christmas" | Ralph Blane; Hugh Martin | 4:09 |
| 10. | "Silent Night (Lord of My Life)" | Joseph Mohr; Franz Xaver Gruber; arr. Scott; Kelley; Haywood | 3:11 |
| 11. | "Blue Christmas" | Billy Hayes; Jay W. Johnson | 3:28 |
| 12. | "Silver Bells" | Jay Livingston; Ray Evans | 4:59 |

On This Winter's Night – Deluxe Edition
| No. | Title | Writer(s) | Length |
|---|---|---|---|
| 13. | "Wonderful Christmastime" | Paul McCartney | 3:20 |
| 14. | "Christmas Through Your Eyes" | Scott; Kelley; Haywood | 3:59 |
| 15. | "Little Saint Nick" | Brian Wilson; Mike Love | 2:36 |
| 16. | "That Spirit of Christmas" | Joel Webster; Mabel John; Parnell Davison | 3:57 |

== Personnel ==
Lady Antebellum

- Dave Haywood – acoustic guitar, electric guitar, background vocals
- Charles Kelley – lead vocals, background vocals
- Hillary Scott – lead vocals, background vocals

Additional personnel

- Roy Agee – trombone
- Sam Bacco – percussion
- Jeff Bailey – trumpet
- Denver Bierman – choir
- Jaclyn Brown – choir
- Kristyn Burke – choir
- Lori Casteel – choir
- Julie Cox – choir
- Chad Cromwell – drums
- Mark Douthit – alto saxophone
- Mike Eldred – choir
- Ashley Escobar – choir
- Tom Fudge – choir
- Jose Fulgeuiro – choir
- Jason "Slim" Gambill – electric guitar
- Barry Green – trombone, bass trombone
- Ryan Greenawalt – choir
- Darrika Hammonds – choir
- David Huff – drum loops, percussion
- Carlos Jara – choir
- Shelley Jennings – choir
- Tammy Jensen – choir
- Bonnie Keen – choir
- Shelby Kernodle – choir
- Melody Kirkpatrick – choir
- Ana Leonard – choir
- Sam Levine – tenor saxophone
- Carsan Lindsey – choir
- Rahni Lindsey – choir
- Gloria Lomax – choir
- Myra Lomax – choir
- Gil Long – tuba
- Rob McNelley – electric guitar
- Doug Moffett – baritone saxophone
- The Nashville String Machine – strings
- Steve Patrick – trumpet
- Larry Paxton – bass guitar, horn arrangements, string arrangements
- Kayla Pritchett – choir
- Chloe Randall – choir
- Bryan Robinson – choir
- Gary Robinson – choir
- Chris Rodriguez – electric guitar
- Mike Rojas – Fender Rhodes, Hammond B-3 organ, piano, synthesizer
- Desirea Swanson – choir
- Jarquica Turner – choir
- Biff Watson – acoustic guitar
- Stephanie Wedan – choir
- Kris Wilkinson – horn arrangements, string arrangements
- Garris Wimmer – choir
- David Wise – choir
- Craig Young – bass guitar
- Jonathan Yudkin – fiddle, harp, mandolin

== Charts ==
=== Weekly charts ===
| Chart (2012) | Peak position |
|---|---|
| Australian Albums (ARIA) | 71 |
| Canadian Albums (Billboard) | 5 |
| US Billboard 200 | 8 |
| US Top Country Albums (Billboard) | 2 |
| US Top Holiday Albums (Billboard) | 1 |

=== Year-end charts ===
| Chart (2012) | Position |
|---|---|
| US Top Country Albums (Billboard) | 58 |

| Chart (2013) | Position |
|---|---|
| Canadian Albums (Billboard) | 27 |
| US Billboard 200 | 66 |
| US Top Country Albums (Billboard) | 18 |

| Chart (2014) | Position |
|---|---|
| US Top Catalog Albums (Billboard) | 35 |

| Chart (2019) | Position |
|---|---|
| US Top Country Albums (Billboard) | 94 |

== Certifications ==
| Region | Certification | Certified units/sales |
|---|---|---|
| Canada (Music Canada) | Platinum | 80,000^{^} |
| United States (RIAA) | Gold | 500,000^{^} |
^{^} Shipments figures based on certification alone.
