= Beggin' for More =

Studio album by Kyle Park
- Released: 19 March 2013
- Genre: Texas country
- Length: 44:52
- Label: Kyle Park Music
- Producer: Kyle Park

Kyle Park chronology
Make or Break Me (2011)	Beggin' for More (2013)	The Blue Roof Sessions (2015)

Beggin' for More is a country album released by singer-songwriter Kyle Park in March 2013.

== History ==
Most of the album's tracks were written or co-written by Park. It is the second solo album produced solely by him. He released it through his own label, Kyle Park Records, on March 19, 2013. The album went to #4 on country iTunes on March 21, and was stated to have a "fresh sound; traditional country mixed with restless, U2-style guitar sounds and unexpected chord changes."

== Singles ==
The track "The Night is Young" was written by Park around a campfire. After its release in early 2013, the single climbed to #3 on the Texas Country Charts, later reaching #1. He commissioned fans to create the music video for the track. The other single from the album, “True Love," also climbed various country charts.

== Track listing ==
No.	Title	Writer(s)	Length
1.	"The Night is Young"	Kyle Park, Thom Shepherd	3:33
2.	"Beggin' For More"	George Ducas, Park	3:11
3.	"You Make Me Believe"	Cody Johnson, Park	3:09
4.	"True Love"	Park	4:09
5.	"Long Distance Relationship"	Park	3:07
6.	"No Woman of Mine"	Johnson, Jesse Raub Jr., Park	3:58
7.	"Tagged"	Park, Shepherd	3:06
8.	"Live Through the Pain"	Park	3:08
9.	"He Got You"	Ralph Murphy, Bobby Wood	3:41
10.	"Turn That Crown Upside Down"	Josh Abbott, Rich O'Toole, Park	2:57
11.	"Like Nobody Will"	Park	3:42
12.	"Fit For the King"	Park	3:21
13.	"Bad Timing"	Park	3:50

== Personnel ==
Production

- Kyle Park - Producer
- John Michael Whitby - Executive Producer
- Austin Deptula - Mixing
- Dave Percefull - Engineer, String Engineer
- Will Armstrong - Engineer
- Sam Seifert - Engineer
- Will Harrison - Engineer
- Memo Guerro - Assistant Engineer
- Eric Lenington - Design, Photography

Musicians

- Will Armstrong - drums, percussion
- John Carroll - electric guitar, baritone guitar, nylon string guitar
- Milo Deering - steel guitar
- Tommy Detamore - steel guitar
- Joe Manuel - acoustic guitar, electric guitar
- Hayden Nicholas - acoustic guitar, baritone guitar, slide guitar
- Kyle Park - acoustic guitar, electric guitar, baritone guitar, lead vocals
- Wes Hightower - background vocals
- Cindy Cashdollar - Dobro
- Larry Franklin - fiddle
- Glenn Fukunaga - Bass guitar
- John Michael Whitby - Hammond B-3 organ, piano, Wurlitzer
- The Tusco String Quartet - Strings

== Chart performance ==
Chart (2013)	Peak position
U.S. Billboard Top Country Albums	24
U.S. Billboard Top Heatseekers	8
U.S. Billboard Independent Albums	31
