= Diamond Rings and Old Barstools =

Single by Tim McGraw with Catherine Dunn

from the album Sundown Heaven Town
- Released: January 26, 2015
- Genre: Country
- Length: 3:18
- Label: Big Machine
- Songwriters: Barry Dean; Luke Laird; Jonathan Singleton
- Producers: Byron Gallimore; Tim McGraw

Tim McGraw singles chronology
"Shotgun Rider" (2014)	"Diamond Rings and Old Barstools" (2015)	"Top of the World" (2015)

"Diamond Rings and Old Barstools" is a song recorded by American country music artist Tim McGraw featuring Catherine Dunn. It was released in January 2015 as the fourth and final single from his second studio album for Big Machine Records, Sundown Heaven Town. The song was written by Jonathan Singleton, Barry Dean and Luke Laird.

== Content ==
The song is a mid-tempo ballad featuring backing vocals from McGraw's cousin, Catherine Dunn. Its lyrics mainly compare certain objects such as "midnight and cigarette smoke" and "watered-down whiskey and Coke" to illustrate a story of two people who are incompatible with each other.

== Critical reception ==
Jon Freeman of Country Weekly gave the song an A−, saying that "It's a gorgeous production: sparse without being skeletal, warm without being overbearing and perfectly tailored to Tim's oak-aged vocals." He said of the lyrics that "Not all of the pairings in the lyric make perfect sense, but that doesn't take anything away from the overall effect and message."

The song was nominated at the 58th Grammy Awards for Best Country Song.

== Music video ==
The music video was directed by Brian Olinger and premiered in March 2015.

== Chart performance ==
The song has sold 298,000 copies in the US as of July 2015.

Chart (2015)	Peak position
Canada Hot 100 (Billboard)	78
Canada Country (Billboard)	10
US Billboard Hot 100	55
US Country Airplay (Billboard)	3
US Hot Country Songs (Billboard)	11

=== Year-end charts ===
Chart (2015)	Position
US Country Airplay (Billboard)	30
US Hot Country Songs (Billboard)	46

== Certifications ==
Region	Certification	Certified units/sales
United States (RIAA)	Gold	500,000^{‡}
^{‡} Sales+streaming figures based on certification alone.
