= Golden (Lady Antebellum album) =

Studio album by Lady Antebellum
- Released: May 6, 2013
- Recorded: 2012–13
- Genre: Country
- Length: 43:52
- Label: Capitol Nashville
- Producers: Nathan Chapman; Paul Worley; Lady Antebellum

Lady Antebellum chronology
On This Winter's Night (2012)	Golden (2013)	747 (2014)

Singles from Golden
- 1. "Downtown" Released: January 22, 2013; 2. "Goodbye Town" Released: May 13, 2013; 3. "Compass" Released: October 14, 2013

Golden is the fifth studio album by American country music trio Lady Antebellum. It was released on May 6, 2013, through Capitol Nashville in Europe and South Africa, and on May 7, in the US, Canada, Australia, and New Zealand. The production on the album was handled by Nathan Chapman, Paul Worley and Lady Antebellum. The album is the first former EMI title to be fully rebranded as a product of Universal Music. The only reference to its old parent is its UPC. On November 12, 2013, a deluxe edition was released, featuring three new songs and acoustic versions of three hits from previous albums.

Golden was supported by three singles: "Downtown", "Goodbye Town", and "Compass". The album received mostly generally positive reviews from music critics for "returning to form," though some critics deemed the album overly-predictable. The album was also a commercial success. It debuted at number one on the US Billboard 200 and US Top Country Albums charts, selling 167,000 copies in its first week. It also peaked at number one on the UK Country Albums Charts and within the top 10 on the Australian, Canadian, Irish, and UK all-genre album charts. The album was certified platinum by the Recording Industry Association of America (RIAA) in June 2023.

== Promotion ==
=== Tour ===
Lady Antebellum first announced their third headlining tour, The Take Me Downtown Tour, in July 2013, with the first tour date set for November 8. However, the band later decided to push back the tour to accommodate the release of the Deluxe Edition of Golden and in order to prepare a better show. The tour kicked off in January 2014, and was expected to visit over 60 cities across North America. Kip Moore and Kacey Musgraves served as the opening acts.

=== Singles ===
The album's lead single, "Downtown", was released on January 22, 2013. It peaked at number two on the Hot Country Songs chart and at number one on US Country Airplay.

"Goodbye Town" was released as a promotional single through iTunes for pre-orders of the album. It was subsequently released as the second official single from Golden on May 13, 2013, and peaked at #11 on the Hot Country chart. The band described "Goodbye Town" as "one of [their] favorite productions" on the record.

The third single, "Compass", was released on October 14, 2013. It is one of the three new recordings featured on the Deluxe Edition of Golden. Lady Antebellum opted to produce the song alongside Nathan Chapman, rather than with their usual producer Paul Worley.

=== Other songs ===
An official lyric video was released for the Deluxe Edition track "And The Radio Played" on November 15, 2013, though no plans have been made to date to release the song as a single.

In April 2014, a re-recorded version of "Golden", featuring vocals from Stevie Nicks, was released as a digital single. This version charted at #50 on the Hot Country Songs chart in the first week after its release.

== Critical reception ==
Professional ratings
Aggregate scores
Source	Rating
Metacritic	70/100
Review scores
Source	Rating
AllMusic	3/5 stars
American Songwriter	4/5 stars
Daily News	3/5 stars
The Gazette	3/5 stars
The Oakland Press	3/4 stars
Rolling Stone	3/5 stars
Roughstock	4/5 stars
Taste of Country	4/5 stars
Toronto Star	2.5/4 stars
USA Today	3/4 stars

Golden has received mostly positive reviews from music critics. At Metacritic, which assigns a weighted average score out of 100 to reviews and ratings from mainstream critics, the album received a metascore of 70, based on 6 reviews. Eric Allen of American Songwriter told that with just "one listen to Golden [and it] immediately declares that Lady A has returned to form and isn't going anywhere in the imaginable future." At Country Weekly, Joseph Hudak rated the album a B−, and called the first half of the album "a little too polished", but towards the end the band is "close to finding the secret for mixing easygoing music with evocative, mature lyrics. It’s musical alchemy." Glenn Gamboa of Newday graded the album a B, and found that the band is "picking approaches that suit the songs best, rather than what keeps all the talented folks occupied most." At The Oakland Press, Gary Graff evoked that the album "changes things up — subtly, to be sure, but just enough to be perceptibly different from its predecessors", which at the same time "still holds close to the middle of the country road here, but it veers just enough to keep things interesting." Roughstock's Dan MacIntosh alluded to how "Golden may be better than all past Lady Antebellum efforts, but it’s by no means perfect". and yet he wrote that "the result is an album that is truly golden, and really difficult to hate." David Burger of The Salt Lake Tribune graded the album a B−, and found that the release contains "both sweet, full-bodied songs that will sound great on the radio this summer, but also features a lot of filler." At Toronto Star, Ben Rayner evoked that the release is "a touch less prissy and overdressed than the high-gloss wallpaper that has come before," which the band "occasionally takes a stab at rockin’ out in restrained fashion without embarrassing itself at all." Billy Dukes of Taste of Country projected forward by stating that "there’s a new maturity on this record that, if allowed to progress, promises something even bigger with the next album." At USA Today, Brian Mansfield affirmed that "a bittersweet edge makes even the liveliest songs more poignant."

However, Stephen Thomas Erlewine of Allmusic criticized the release as being "so cheerful" that it makes the album seem "a little churlish", and he felt the need "to complain that the songs here aren't grabbers: they're slow burns, designed to sink into the subconscious through repeated plays on radio, in-store sound systems, waiting rooms, and bumper music." Yet, Erlewine noted "that's fine", and called the album a "professional product at its finest, meticulously assembled, polished until it gleams, designed to be nothing more than thoroughly agreeable." At Daily News, Jim Farber highlighted that the album contains songs that are "sun-kissed, expensively constructed, and bound to reap a mint", but that is not necessarily a good thing because "like all Lady A ditties, they’re also lacking in little things like personality, detail and need." At The Gazette, Bernard Perusse told that as a consolation we should "just be happy that this disc is a smooth, pleasant-enough improvement over the last one." Chuck Eddy of Rolling Stone wrote that the release "feels like a house of mirrors". PopMatters' Dave Heaton rated the album a five-out-of-ten, and said that the release is "an overall sedate," and "relatively predictable album".

== Commercial performance ==
Golden debuted at number one on the US Billboard 200 chart, selling 167,000 copies in its first week, according to Nielsen Soundscan. This became Lady Antebellum's third US number one debut. The album also debuted at number one on the US Top Country Albums chart, becoming the group's fourth number one on that chart. In its second week, the album dropped to number five on the chart, selling an additional 56,000 copies. In its third week, the album dropped to number ten on the chart, selling an additional 34,000 copies. On November 20, 2013, the album was certified gold by the Recording Industry Association of America (RIAA) for sales of over 500,000 copies in the US. As of January 2014, the album has sold 558,000 copies in the United States.

== Track listing ==
All songs produced by Paul Worley and Lady Antebellum, except "Compass", produced by Lady Antebellum and Nathan Chapman.

Golden – Standard edition
No.	Title	Writer(s)	Lead Vocals	Length
1.	"Get to Me"	Hillary Lindsey; James T. Slater	Hillary Scott	3:48
2.	"Goodbye Town"	Hillary Scott; Charles Kelley; Dave Haywood; Josh Kear	Charles Kelley; Scott	4:48
3.	"Nothin' Like the First Time"	Sarah Buxton; Jedd Hughes	Scott; Kelley	3:44
4.	"Downtown"	Luke Laird; Shane McAnally; Natalie Hemby	Scott	3:16
5.	"Better Off Now (That You're Gone)"	Will Hoge; Brian Layson	Kelley	3:03
6.	"It Ain't Pretty"	Nicolle Galyon; Eric Paslay	Scott	3:29
7.	"Can't Stand the Rain"	Scott; Kelley; Haywood; Kear	Kelley	3:11
8.	"Golden"	Scott; Kelley; Haywood; Paslay	Kelley	3:27
9.	"Long Teenage Goodbye"	Scott; Kelley; Haywood; Lindsey	Scott	3:42
10.	"All for Love"	Scott; Kelley; Haywood; Dennis Edwards; Jason "Slim" Gambill; Jonathan Long; Chris Tyrrell; Clint Chandler	Kelley; Scott	3:16
11.	"Better Man"	Kelley; Haywood; Edwards; Gambill; Long; Chandler	Kelley	4:04
12.	"Generation Away"	Scott; Kelley; Haywood; Brad Warren; Brett Warren	Kelley; Scott	4:03
Total length:				43:52

Deluxe edition
No.	Title	Writer(s)	Lead Vocals	Length
13.	"Compass"	Mikkel Eriksen; Tor Erik Hemransen; Ammar Malik; Ross Golan; Daniel Omelio; Emile Haynie	Kelley; Scott	3:04
14.	"And the Radio Played"	Scott; Kelley; Haywood; Kear; Chapman	Kelley; Scott	3:13
15.	"Life as We Know It"	Scott; Kelley; Haywood	Kelley; Scott	4:22
16.	"Need You Now" (iTunes Live session performance)	Scott; Kelley; Haywood; Kear	Scott; Kelley	4:04
17.	"Just a Kiss" (Backstage acoustic session)	Scott; Kelley; Haywood; Dallas Davidson	Scott; Kelley	3:45
18.	"I Run to You" (iTunes Live session performance)	Scott; Kelley; Haywood; Tom Douglas	Kelley; Scott	4:47
Total length:				67:06

== Personnel ==
Lady Antebellum

- Dave Haywood – acoustic guitar, Hammond B-3 organ, mandolin, piano, ukulele, background vocals
- Charles Kelley – lead vocals, background vocals, acoustic guitar, tambourine
- Hillary Scott – lead vocals, background vocals

Musicians

- Chad Cromwell – drums, shaker, tambourine
- Jason "Slim" Gambill – electric guitar
- Will Hoge – harmonica
- David Huff – drum loops
- Rob McNelley – electric guitar
- Michael Rhodes – bass guitar
- Michael Rojas – Fender Rhodes, Hammond B-3 organ, piano, synthesizer
- Biff Watson – acoustic guitar, banjo
- Glenn Worf – bass guitar
- Paul Worley – acoustic guitar, electric guitar

Design

- Terri Apanasewicz – hair stylist, make-up
- Jonna Carter — art direction
- Michelle Hall – art producer
- Joseph Llanes – photography
- Lee Moore – stylist, wardrobe design
- Karen Naff – art direction

Production

- Natthaphol Abhigantaphand – assistant engineer
- Daniel Bacigalupi – assistant engineer
- Steve Blackmon – assistant engineer
- Paige Conners – production coordination
- Adam Grover – assistant engineer
- Erik Hellerman – engineer
- Charles Kelley – producer
- Joe Martino – assistant engineer
- Andrew Mendelson – mastering
- Allen Parker – assistant engineer
- Clarke Schleicher – engineer, mixing
- Nick Spezia – assistant engineer
- Brad Winters – assistant engineer
- Jeremy Witt – production assistant
- Paul Worley – producer

== Charts ==
=== Weekly charts ===
Chart (2013)	Peak position
Australian Albums (ARIA)	8
Austrian Albums (Ö3 Austria)	33
Belgian Albums (Ultratop Flanders)	115
Belgian Albums (Ultratop Wallonia)	186
Canadian Albums (Billboard)	2
Danish Albums (Hitlisten)	38
Irish Albums (IRMA)	10
Dutch Albums (Album Top 100)	78
German Albums (Offizielle Top 100)	51
New Zealand Albums (RMNZ)	26
Scottish Albums (Official Charts)	5
Swiss Albums (Schweizer Hitparade)	36
UK Albums (Official Charts)	7
UK Album Downloads (Official Charts)	8
UK Country Albums (Official Charts)	1
US Billboard 200	1
US Top Country Albums (Billboard)	1

=== Year-end charts ===
Chart (2013)	Position
Australian Albums (ARIA)	92
Canadian Albums(Billboard)	41
US Billboard 200	56
US Top Country Albums (Billboard)	13

Chart (2014)	Position
US Billboard 200	139
US Top Country Albums (Billboard)	20

=== Singles ===
Year	Single	Peak chart positions				
Year	Single	US Country	US Country Airplay	US	CAN Country	CAN
2013	"Downtown"	2	1	29	1	26
2013	"Goodbye Town"	22	11	80	11	77
2013	"Compass"	6	1	46	2	51

== Certifications ==
Region	Certification	Certified units/sales
Australia (ARIA)	Gold	35,000^{^}
Canada (Music Canada)	Gold	40,000^{^}
United States (RIAA)	Platinum	1,000,000^{‡}
^{^} Shipments figures based on certification alone.^{‡} Sales+streaming figures based on certification alone.

== Release history ==
Country	Date	Label
United Kingdom	May 6, 2013	Parlophone
South Africa	May 6, 2013	EMI
United States	May 7, 2013	Capitol Nashville
Canada	May 7, 2013	Capitol Nashville
Australia	May 7, 2013	EMI
New Zealand	May 7, 2013	EMI
Philippines	May 15, 2013	Universal Music
Taiwan	May 24, 2013	Gold Typhoon
