= Lookin' for That Girl =

Single by Tim McGraw

from the album Sundown Heaven Town
- Released: January 13, 2014
- Genre: Country, Country pop
- Length: 4:18 (original); 3:24 (AM radio mix)
- Label: Big Machine
- Songwriters: Mark Irwin; James T. Slater; Chris Tompkins
- Producers: Byron Gallimore; Tim McGraw

Tim McGraw singles chronology
"Southern Girl" (2013)	"Lookin' for That Girl" (2014)	"Meanwhile Back at Mama's" (2014)

"Lookin' for That Girl" is a song recorded by American country music artist Tim McGraw. It was released in January 2014 as the first single from his second studio album for Big Machine Records, Sundown Heaven Town. The single was still rising the charts when Big Machine Records pulled it so that McGraw's next single, "Meanwhile Back at Mama's", could be released.

== History ==
Co-writer James T. Slater told Roughstock that the idea came when writing with Mark Irwin, who suggested that the two write with Chris Tompkins. Slater said that he had an idea that "wasn't really fitting anything" when Tompkins played a loop on a drum machine and came up with the song's title.

Two mixes of the song exist: the original mix and an "A.M. Radio" remix, which reduces the heavy Auto-Tune used throughout the song.

== Critical reception ==
Giving it a "C", Joseph Hudak of Country Weekly said that "sonically, it recalls slow-rolling '90s Southern rap" but that "it's jarring in nearly every other way." He criticized the "electronic framework" and the lack of a country sound, as well as McGraw's "clipped" performance, and said that the lyrics were "slapdash, and if we're honest, a little too youthful for one of country's elder statesmen." Matt Bjorke of Roughstock gave the original mix of the song 2.5 stars out of 5, criticizing the use of Auto-Tune on the chorus but saying that the song was "likeable enough"; he gave the "A.M. Radio" remix 3 out of 5 stars. Kevin John Coyne of Country Universe gave the song a "D" grade, criticizing the "plodding mid-tempo groove that never gets out of first gear" and "grating vocoder effect". In a play on the song's hook, he concluded his review by writing "Tim McGraw used to be the gold standard. I’m looking for that guy, that guy, that guy."

In an editorial for The Boot, Sterling Whitaker observed that many fans on Twitter and Taste of Country have criticized the song for its hip hop-styled production and Auto-Tune.

== Music video ==
The music video was directed by Sophie Muller and premiered on March 14, 2014.

== Chart performance ==
The song entered the Country Airplay chart at No. 46 for chart dated February 1, 2014, and No. 10 on the Country Digital Songs two weeks later at No. 10. It spent 7 weeks on the Billboard's Bubbling Under Hot 100 chart before debuting on Billboard Hot 100 at No. 96 for chart dated April 5, 2014. The song has sold 217,000 copies in the U.S. as of April 2014.

Chart (2014)	Peak position
Canada Hot 100 (Billboard)	47
Canada Country (Billboard)	30
US Billboard Hot 100	85
US Country Airplay (Billboard)	15
US Hot Country Songs (Billboard)	18

=== Year-end charts ===
Chart (2014)	Position
US Country Airplay (Billboard)	87
US Hot Country Songs (Billboard)	82
