= Kyle Park =

American country-music singer-songwriter (b. 1985)

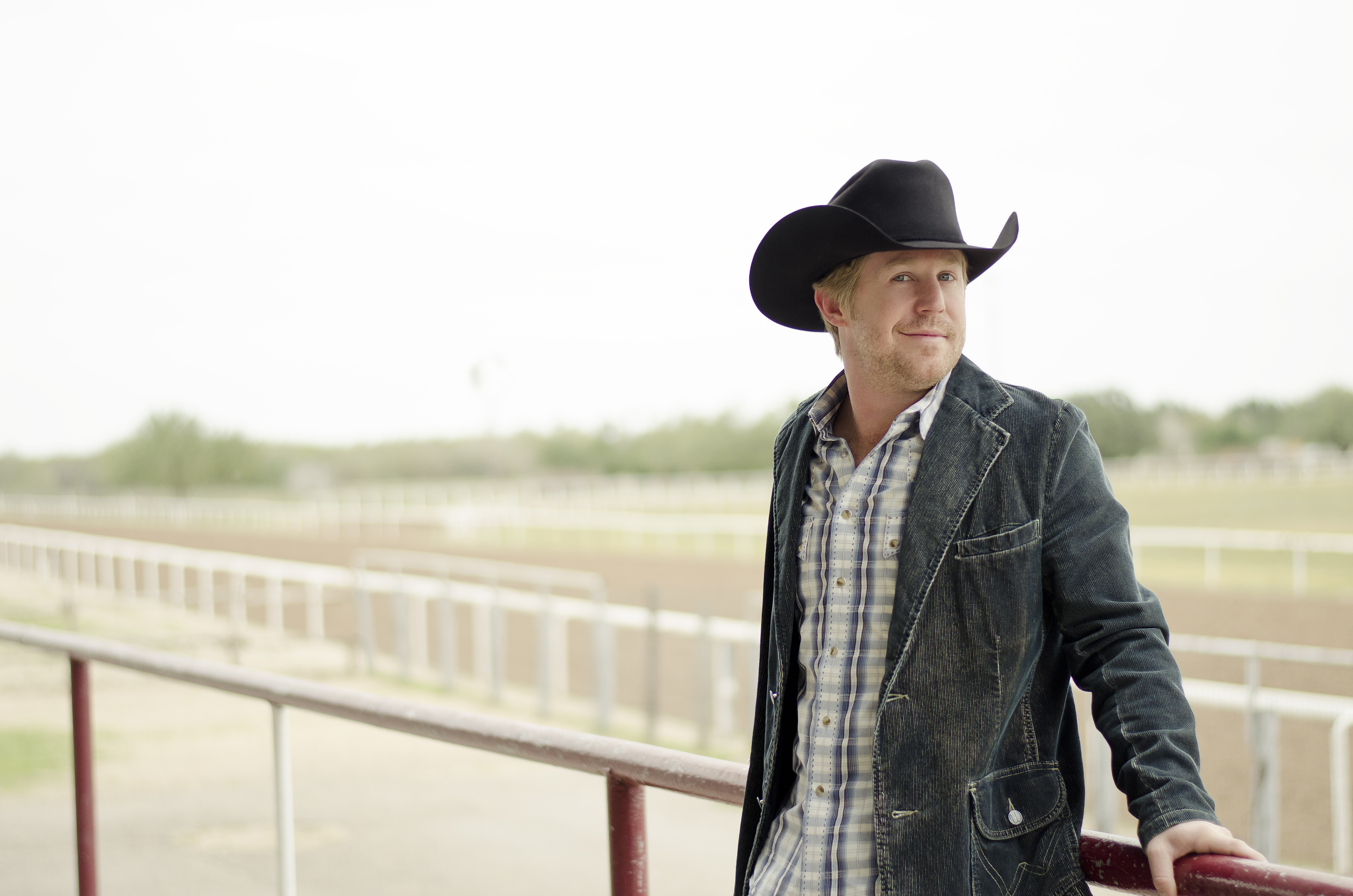

Background information
- Born: Austin, Texas
- Genres: Texas country
- Occupations: Singer-songwriter, music producer
- Instruments: Vocals, guitar
- Years active: 2005–present
- Website: kylepark.com

Kyle Park (born July 8, 1985) is a country music singer-songwriter, guitarist, and music producer born in Austin, Texas.

== Biography ==
=== Early life ===
Kyle Park was born in July 1985 in Austin, Texas, and was raised in Leander, a small country town north of Austin, where he attended Leander High School. He listened to country and rock radio in particular, and eventually began focusing on artists such as Clint Black and Chris LeDoux.

Park was 12 when his father died from a heart attack.

Park started playing guitar at age 14, and wrote his first song and first performed live the next year. His music was first played on the radio (KVET 98.1 Austin) when he was 17 years old.

=== Music career ===
He has celebrated numerous #1 Texas radio singles from his self-released seven studio albums. Since 2005, he has performed thousands of shows across North America and Europe, often headlining those events, as well as opening for artists such as George Strait, Clint Black, Willie Nelson, and more. As of 2024, he has independently released: Big Time (2005), Anywhere in Texas (2008), Make Or Break Me (2011), Beggin’ For More (2013), The Blue Roof Sessions (2015), Don’t Forget Where You Come From (2018), and All Nighters (2024).

Park is also a member of Western Swing band The Texas Trio. Formed in 2020, the band consists of Park, Jason Roberts (fiddle, mandolin, guitar, vocals), and John Michael Whitby (piano, vocals). They have one self-titled album.

== Discography ==
=== Albums ===
Title	Album details	Peak chart positions	
Title	Album details	US Country	US Heat
Big Time	Release date: 2005; Label: Lazy S.O.B. Recordings	–	–
Anywhere in Texas	Release date: September 16, 2008; Label: Kyle Park Music	–	–
The Spring EP	Release date: April 6, 2010; Label: Winding Road Music	69	–
The Fall EP	Release date: September 21, 2010; Label: Winding Road Music	56	28
Make or Break Me	Release date: September 20, 2011; Label: Winding Road Music	53	15
Beggin' for More	Release date: March 19, 2013; Label: Kyle Park Music	24	8
The Blue Roof Sessions	Release date: October 23, 2015; Label: Kyle Park Music	–	24
Don't Forget Where You Come From	Release date: 2018; Label: Kyle Park Music	–	–
All Nighters	Release date: January 12, 2024; Label: Kyle Park Music	–	–
"—" denotes releases that did not chart

=== Singles ===
Year	Single
2006	"Half Empty Shotgun"
2007	"Somebody's Trying To Steal My Heart"
2008	Baby I'm Gone
2008	"Cold In Colorado"
2009	"Tossin' And Turnin'"
2009	"Don't Look"
2010	"All Night"
2010	"I'm Missing You"
2011	"Make or Break Me"
2011	"Leavin' Stephenville"
2012	"The Night Is Young"
2013	"True Love"
2013	"Fit for the King"
2013	"Long Distance Relationship"
2014	"Turn That Crown Upside Down"
2015	"What Goes Around Comes Around"
2015	"Come On"
2017	"Rednecks With Paychecks"
2017	"Don't Forget Where You Come From"
2018	"What The Heaven"
2019	"Ain't Nobody Hotter"
2019	"Rio"
2019	"Every Day Kind of Love"
2021	"Rewind"
2021	"What's Your Drinkin' Song?"
2023	"Me When I Drink"
2023	"A Broken Heart Like That"
2023	"Hill Country Home"

=== Music videos ===
- "Make or Break Me" (2011)
- "Leavin' Stephenville" (2012)
- "Fit for the King" (2013)
- "True Love" (2013)
- "Long Distance Relationship" (2013)
- "Turn That Crown Upside Down" (2014)
- "What Goes Around Comes Around" (2015)
- "Come On" (2015)
- "Rednecks with Paychecks" (2016)
- "Don't Forget Where You Come From" (2017)
- "What the Heaven" (2018)
- "Ain't Nobody Hotter" (2018)
- "Rio" (2019)
- "Every Day Kind of Love" (2019)
- "What's Your Drinkin' Song" (2022)
- "Me When I Drink" (2023)
