= Jason Cassidy =

American country music artist

Jason Cassidy is an American country music artist.

== Background ==
Jason Cassidy was born in New Caney, Texas. His first public performance was at the age of 13 when he sang “Jesus Is Here To Stay” at his church with his youth group singing as the lead. He began learning to play guitar at the age of 20, using books and YouTube videos.

Cassidy began singing and playing in bars, and after being approached after a performance began singing performing as a singer with a country band, Husker Row.

== Music career ==
In 2009 Cassidy began writing material for his debut album and began working with producer Doug Deforest. The album was recorded at Lake Paradise Studios in Arkansas in August 2010 and released on November 2, 2010. He worked with radio promoter Rick Hogan to promote “Sounds Like An Angel To Me,” his first single, to Texas radio and it peaked on the Texas Music charts at #17.

In April 2011 Cassidy signed to A-Blake Records who agreed to repackage and re-release My Redemption. The new album contained an acoustic version of “Honky Tonk Heaven” and a newly recorded song “What Do You Have for a Heartache.” To coincide with the album release, Cassidy promoted “Honky Tonk Heaven” as a single, and it rose to the top of the charts in Texas; it was a #1 hit on TRRR, and #2 on the Texas Music Chart which is published as part of Best In Texas magazine.

In 2013 Cassidy released his second album, Keep it Country.

During this period, Cassidy signed to Paradigm Nashville for exclusive booking and was featured in an article on rising country stars in Billboard Country Update.

The release of “What If” followed, and was accompanied by a music video directed by Ryan Smith and Potsy Poncirolli of Nashville. The video was aired on CMT.com, GAC’s “Out of The Box,” and on CMT Pure where it reached the #1 spot on March 30, 2012 on the network’s 12-Pack Countdown. It remained in the Top 10 for nearly five months.

In 2015, Cassidy release the album 717, a mix of traditional and modern country songs.

== Discography ==
=== Albums ===
Title	Album details	Peak chart positions	
Title	Album details	US Country	US Heat
My Redemption	Release date: March 26, 2011; Label: A-Blake Records	—	—
Keep It Country	Release date: July 16, 2013; Label: A-Blake Records	41	12
717	Release date: May 19, 2015; Label: JC Music	40	24
"—" denotes releases that did not chart

=== Music videos ===
Year	Video	Director
2012	"What If"	Potsy Ponciroli
