= Goodbye Town =

Single by Lady Antebellum

from the album Golden
- Released: May 13, 2013
- Recorded: 2013
- Genre: Country
- Length: 4:48
- Label: Capitol Nashville
- Songwriter(s): Hillary Scott; Charles Kelley; Dave Haywood; Josh Kear
- Producer(s): Paul Worley; Lady Antebellum

Lady Antebellum singles chronology
"Downtown" (2013)	"Goodbye Town" (2013)	"Compass" (2013)

"Goodbye Town" is a song recorded by American country music group Lady Antebellum. It was released on May 13, 2013, as the second single from their fifth studio album Golden. The song was written by band members Hillary Scott, Charles Kelley, and Dave Haywood, along with Josh Kear, and it features lead vocals from Kelley, and a little bit from Scott.

== Content ==
The song is about a breakup, seen mainly from the perspective of the male in the relationship, who sees the sights of his town and expresses desire to leave, because every aspect of the town reminds him of his lover. Co-writer Josh Kear brought the idea for the song to Lady Antebellum during a writing session, drawing experience from a girlfriend with whom he broke up during his last year of college. He and the three members of Lady Antebellum wrote the song during the group's Own The Night Tour.

== Critical reception ==
Billy Dukes of Taste of Country gave the song four stars out of five, writing that "the growth of Lady Antebellum — already one of the top groups in country music — is as exciting as this new music." He praised the song's "fresh production" and called the vocals "pleasantly surprising." Joseph Hudak of Country Weekly was less favorable, saying that the song has "an air of seriousness that doesn't exactly scream 'summer singalong.' Its pace feels overly deliberate, and the piano breakdown midway through calls to mind everything that weighed down portions of Need You Now and Own the Night." Hudak praised Kelley's "rough-hewn" voice and "whoa-oh-oh payoff" at the end, ultimately giving the song a C+.

== Music video ==
The music video was directed by Peter Zavadil and filmed in Nashville. It premiered on The Ellen DeGeneres Show on May 13, 2013.

== Chart performance ==
"Goodbye Town" debuted at number 46 on the U.S. Billboard Country Airplay chart for the week dated May 25, 2013, and at number 36 on the U.S. Billboard Hot Country Songs chart for the week dated June 1, 2013. It also debuted at number 98 on the U.S. Billboard Hot 100 and number 95 on the Canadian Hot 100.

Chart (2013)	Peak position
Canada (Canadian Hot 100)	77
Canada Country (Billboard)	11
US Billboard Hot 100	80
US Country Airplay (Billboard)	11
US Hot Country Songs (Billboard)	22

=== Year-end charts ===
Chart (2013)	Position
US Country Airplay (Billboard)	50
US Hot Country Songs (Billboard)	64
