= Shotgun Rider =

Single by Tim McGraw

from the album Sundown Heaven Town
- Released: September 8, 2014
- Genre: Country pop; pop rock
- Length: 3:56
- Label: Big Machine
- Songwriter(s): Marv Green; Hillary Lindsey; Troy Verges
- Producer(s): Byron Gallimore; Tim McGraw

Tim McGraw singles chronology
"Meanwhile Back at Mama's" (2014)	"Shotgun Rider" (2014)	"Diamond Rings and Old Barstools" (2015)

"Shotgun Rider" is a song recorded by American country music artist Tim McGraw. It was released on September 8, 2014 as the third single from his second studio album for Big Machine Records, Sundown Heaven Town. The song was written by Marv Green, Hillary Lindsey, and Troy Verges.

McGraw previously recorded a different song of the same name on his 2007 album, Let It Go.

== Content ==
"Shotgun Rider" is a song about a male narrator wanting to ride around with his lover in a truck, telling her that he does not want anyone else in the front seat or "shotgun" seat.

== Critical reception ==
Billy Dukes of Taste of Country gave "Shotgun Rider" a favorable review, writing that "the song is an example of how the singer, producer and songwriter all need to come together to create beautiful music." Chuck Dauphin of Billboard called it "the perfect mix of old-school McGraw with some stirring steel guitar work and a few new sounds with some nifty guitar riffs." Kurt Wolff of radio.com called it "a midtempo song with a cool, confident melody that feels tailor-made for a road-trip mixtape."

== Music video ==
The music video was directed by Bennett Miller and premiered in October 2014.

== Chart performance ==
"Shotgun Rider" debuted at number 51 on the U.S. Billboard Country Airplay chart for the week of September 20, 2014. It also debuted at number 25 on the U.S. Billboard Hot Country Songs chart for the week of October 4, 2014. The single was certified Gold by the RIAA on January 9, 2015, and as of March 2015, the single has sold 665,000 copies in the United States.

Chart (2014–2015)	Peak position
Canada (Canadian Hot 100)	54
Canada Country (Billboard)	1
US Billboard Hot 100	38
US Country Airplay (Billboard)	1
US Hot Country Songs (Billboard)	1

=== Year-end charts ===
Chart (2014)	Position
US Country Airplay (Billboard)	77
US Hot Country Songs (Billboard)	72

Chart (2015)	Position
US Country Airplay (Billboard)	60
US Hot Country Songs (Billboard)	40

== Certifications ==
Region	Certification	Certified units/sales
United States (RIAA)	Platinum	1,000,000^{‡}
^{‡} Sales+streaming figures based on certification alone.
