= Downtown (Lady Antebellum song) =

Single by Lady Antebellum

from the album Golden
- Released: January 22, 2013
- Recorded: 2012
- Genre: Country pop
- Length: 3:16
- Label: Capitol Nashville
- Songwriter(s): Luke Laird; Shane McAnally; Natalie Hemby
- Producer(s): Paul Worley; Lady Antebellum

Lady Antebellum singles chronology
"Wanted You More" (2012)	"Downtown" (2013)	"Goodbye Town" (2013)

"Downtown" is a song recorded by American country music group Lady Antebellum. It was released on January 22, 2013, as the first single from their fifth studio album Golden, and it features lead vocals from Scott. The song was written by Luke Laird, Shane McAnally, and Natalie Hemby. It was originally planned to be recorded by fellow country artist Miranda Lambert.

== Critical reception ==
Billy Dukes of Taste of Country gave the song four and a half stars out of five, writing that "a guitar lick postmarked 1962 steers the song and pushes the band in an exciting new direction" and "Hillary Scott never sounded like she’s had more fun in the studio than on this song." Matt Bjorke of Roughstock gave the song four stars out of five, calling it "a burst of sunshine mixed in an ear worm of a melody that has audible steel guitars in the mix and features a nice twangy guitar solo balanced with some steel guitars."

== Music video ==
The music video was directed by Peter Zavadil and co-stars Beth Behrs from CBS's 2 Broke Girls. It premiered on E! News on March 6, 2013.

=== Synopsis ===
The video begins with Charles and Dave talking about what they did the night before. Feeling left out Hillary wants them to take her out on the town later that night but they disagree saying she is too much of a goody two-shoes who would rather watch romantic comedies. In order to prove that she can have fun like the guys, Hillary calls Beth Behrs to see if she wants to go out on the town and "get so crazy they get arrested". Beth assures her that when they hang out together they can.

Hillary and Beth head downtown in an attempt to get arrested; such as shoplifting and pouring coffee and donuts on two police officers, Garcia and Cash, played by Dave and Charles. They taunt the police officers but keep on getting ignored because they are distracted watching internet cat videos. As a last ditch effort to get their attention Hillary takes a stool and slams it into the police car's front window shield. The video ends with the girls in hand cuffs and being led into the car. In addition there are performance scenes of the band.

== Chart performance ==
"Downtown" debuted at number 25 on the U.S. Billboard Country Airplay chart for the week of February 9, 2013, making it the highest chart debut of their career to date. It also debuted at number 42 on the U.S. Billboard Hot Country Songs chart for the week of February 9, 2013. It also debuted at number 32 on the Canadian Hot 100 and number 45 on the U.S. Billboard Hot 100 chart for the week of February 23, 2013. It also debuted at number 96 on the South Korea GAON chart for the week of April 21, 2013.

Chart (2013)	Peak position
Canada (Canadian Hot 100)	26
Canada AC (Billboard)	31
Canada Country (Billboard)	1
Japan (Japan Hot 100) (Billboard)	98
South Korea (GAON)	60
US Billboard Hot 100	29
US Country Airplay (Billboard)	1
US Hot Country Songs (Billboard)	2

=== Year-end charts ===
Chart (2013)	Position
Canada Canadian Hot 100	90
US Billboard Hot 100	93
US Country Airplay (Billboard)	33
US Hot Country Songs (Billboard)	18

== Certifications ==
Region	Certification	Certified units/sales
United States (RIAA)	Platinum	942,000

== Release history ==
Country	Date	Format
United States	January 22, 2013	Radio airplay
Canada	February 5, 2013	Digital download
United States	February 5, 2013	Digital download
