= Truck Yeah =

Single by Tim McGraw

from the album Two Lanes of Freedom
- Released: July 3, 2012
- Genre: Country rock
- Length: 3:28
- Label: Big Machine
- Songwriters: Chris Lucas; Preston Brust; Chris Janson; Danny Myrick
- Producers: Byron Gallimore; Tim McGraw

Tim McGraw singles chronology
"Right Back Atcha Babe" (2012)	"Truck Yeah" (2012)	"One of Those Nights" (2012)

"Truck Yeah" is a song written by Chris Lucas and Preston Brust of LoCash (formerly LoCash Cowboys), Chris Janson, and Danny Myrick and recorded by American country music artist Tim McGraw. It was released on July 3, 2012, as the first single from his 2013 album Two Lanes of Freedom and his first single for Big Machine Records. The release of the single overlapped McGraw's previous single "Right Back Atcha Babe," promoted by Curb Records, due to a rivalry between the two record labels.

== Critical reception ==
Billy Dukes of Taste of Country gave the song four and a half stars out of five, writing that it "isn’t intended to be the smartest song on the radio, but it might be the most fun." Matt Bjorke of Roughstock gave the song four stars out of five, saying that "the swagger of the melody and McGraw's strong delivery of the lyrics" makes it a hit. Ben Foster of Country Universe gave the song a failing grade, writing that "it sounds dumb and ridiculous upon arrival [...] and then it’s all downhill from there."

== Music video ==
The music video was filmed in Chattanooga, Tennessee. It was directed by Chris Hicky and premiered in September 2012.

== Track listing ==
1. "Truck Yeah" – 3:28
2. "Truck Yeah (Live)" – 4:16

== Chart performance ==
"Truck Yeah" debuted at number 22 on the U.S. Billboard Hot Country Songs chart for the week of July 21, 2012, becoming McGraw's highest chart debut ever. It also debuted at number 69 on the U.S. Billboard Hot 100 chart for the week of July 21, 2012. It also debuted at number 52 on the Canadian Hot 100 chart for the week of July 21, 2012.

Chart (2012)	Peak position
Canada Country (Billboard)	3
Canada Hot 100 (Billboard)	52
US Billboard Hot 100	57
US Country Airplay (Billboard)	10
US Hot Country Songs (Billboard)	11

=== Year-end charts ===
Chart (2012)	Position
US Country Songs (Billboard)	51

== Certifications ==
Region	Certification	Certified units/sales
United States (RIAA)	Platinum	1,000,000^{^}
^{^} Shipments figures based on certification alone.
