= Tim McGraw & Friends =

Compilation album by Tim McGraw
- Released: January 22, 2013
- Genre: Country
- Length: 45:27
- Label: Curb
- Producer: Various

Tim McGraw chronology
Emotional Traffic (2012)	Tim McGraw & Friends (2013)	Two Lanes of Freedom (2013)

Tim McGraw & Friends is the eighth compilation album by American country music singer Tim McGraw. It was released on January 22, 2013, by Curb Records.

== Background ==
Tim McGraw & Friends is a compilation of McGraw's collaborations with artists Faith Hill, Jerry Lee Lewis and Jon Brion, Kenny Rogers, Ray Benson, Tony Bennett, Jo Dee Messina, Gwyneth Paltrow, Tracy Lawrence, Randy Travis, Colt Ford and Lionel Richie. This 11-track album is McGraw's first album of duets.

== Release information ==
The project was released January 22, 2013, two weeks before the release of McGraw's first album for Big Machine Records, Two Lanes of Freedom. The album was preceded by the release of the song "Twisted" featuring Colt Ford.

== Track listing ==
No.	Title	Writer(s)	Collaborator	Length
1.	"Sail On"	Lionel Richie	Lionel Richie	5:05
2.	"Twisted"	Colt Ford, Wayne Hardnett, Scott Weatherwax	Colt Ford	4:17
3.	"Owe Them More Than That"	John Guess, Tony Martin, Clessie Lee Morisette, Roger Springer	Kenny Rogers	4:11
4.	"Me and Tennessee"	Chris Martin	Gwyneth Paltrow	4:44
5.	"Middle Age Crazy"	Sonny Throckmorton	Jerry Lee Lewis and Jon Brion	3:44
6.	"Can't Hurt a Man"	Lance Miller, Brad Warren, Brett Warren	Randy Travis	2:46
7.	"Find Out Who Your Friends Are"	Casey Beathard, Ed Hill	Tracy Lawrence and Kenny Chesney	3:48
8.	"Cold, Cold Heart"	Hank Williams	Tony Bennett	3:15
9.	"Milk Cow Blues"	Kokomo Arnold	Ray Benson	5:53
10.	"Bring On the Rain"	Billy Montana, Helen Darling	Jo Dee Messina	3:59
11.	"It's Your Love"	Stephony Smith	Faith Hill	3:45

== Chart performance ==
=== Album ===
Chart (2013)	Peak position
US Billboard 200	126
US Billboard Top Country Albums	18
