= Meanwhile Back at Mama's =

Single by Tim McGraw featuring Faith Hill

from the album Sundown Heaven Town
- Released: April 14, 2014
- Studio: Blackbird Studio (Nashville, TN)
- Genre: Country
- Length: 3:47
- Label: Big Machine
- Songwriter(s): Tom Douglas; Jaren Johnston; Jeffrey Steele
- Producer(s): Byron Gallimore; Tim McGraw

Tim McGraw singles chronology
"Lookin' for That Girl" (2014)	"Meanwhile Back at Mama's" (2014)	"Shotgun Rider" (2014)

Faith Hill singles chronology
"American Heart" (2012)	"Meanwhile Back at Mama's" (2014)	"Speak to a Girl" (2017)

"Meanwhile Back at Mama's" is a song recorded by American country music artist Tim McGraw and his wife Faith Hill. It was released in April 2014 as the second single from his second studio album for Big Machine Records, Sundown Heaven Town. The song was written by Jeffrey Steele, Jaren Johnston and Tom Douglas.

== Critical reception ==
Billy Dukes of Taste of Country gave the song a positive review, and praised Hill's harmony on the song. He stated that "Tim McGraw and his wife Faith Hill had beauty and style in excess, and that sincerity spilled into the first few rows. None of those qualities are lacking on this simply wonderful country ditty." He also praised Faith Hill's vocals, saying "together, Faith Hill and Tim McGraw have never missed. Each song they record together feels like a gift. They're strategic with when they share a studio, never doing so when the time and song isn’t right. The chorus of this song is a sing-along with familial roots. Anyone other than Hill would have almost been offensive."

== Music video ==
The music video was directed by Shane Drake and premiered in June 2014. The video was shot at Tim & Faith's farm in Nashville and performance shots from their 2014 ACM performance was also used in the video.

== Chart performance ==
"Meanwhile Back at Mama's" debuted at number 41 on the U.S. Billboard Country Airplay chart for the week of May 3, 2014. The song peaked at #2 on Country Airplay, behind Dierks Bentley's "Drunk on a Plane". The song has sold 585,000 copies in the U.S. as of October 2014.

Chart (2014)	Peak position
Canada (Canadian Hot 100)	47
Canada Country (Billboard)	1
US Billboard Hot 100	41
US Country Airplay (Billboard)	2
US Hot Country Songs (Billboard)	7

=== Year-end charts ===
Chart (2014)	Position
US Country Airplay (Billboard)	32
US Hot Country Songs (Billboard)	20

== Certifications ==
Region	Certification	Certified units/sales
United States (RIAA)	Platinum	1,000,000^{‡}
^{‡} Sales+streaming figures based on certification alone.
