= One of Those Nights (Tim McGraw song) =

Single by Tim McGraw

from the album Two Lanes of Freedom
- Released: November 12, 2012
- Recorded: 2012
- Genre: Country
- Length: 3:56 (album version); 3:44 (radio edit)
- Label: Big Machine
- Songwriters: Luke Laird; Rodney Clawson; Chris Tompkins
- Producers: Byron Gallimore; Tim McGraw

Tim McGraw singles chronology
"Truck Yeah" (2012)	"One of Those Nights" (2012)	"Highway Don't Care" (2013)

"One of Those Nights" is a song written by Luke Laird, Rodney Clawson, and Chris Tompkins and recorded by American country music artist Tim McGraw. It was released in November 2012 as the second single from McGraw's 2013 album Two Lanes of Freedom and his second one from Big Machine Records.

== Critical reception ==
Billy Dukes of Taste of Country gave the song three stars out of five, writing that "McGraw certainly sounds refreshed on this new song from a new record label partner, but much like songs late in his career with Curb, it feels like an attempt is made to make every moment a huge moment." Matt Bjorke of Roughstock gave the song four stars out of five, calling it "a sweet little song with one of McGraw's most engaging vocals and a well-produced backing track." Ben Foster of Country Universe gave the song a C grade, saying that "a better hook could have compensated to some extent for the generally uninspiring lyrical content, but the way it is, there’s precious little for the listener to grab onto."

== Music video ==
The music video was directed by Sherman Halsey and premiered in December 2012. It depicts the process of making a music video, and is McGraw's final video to be directed by Halsey before his death in 2013.

== Chart performance ==
"One of Those Nights" debuted at number 29 on the U.S. Billboard Hot Country Songs chart for the week of November 17, 2012. It also debuted at number 96 on the U.S. Billboard Hot 100 chart for the week of December 15, 2012. It also debuted at number 77 on the Canadian Hot 100 chart for the week of November 17, 2012. On the chart dated March 9, 2013, it became McGraw's first number one since "Felt Good on My Lips" in January 2011.

Chart (2012–2013)	Peak position
Canada Hot 100 (Billboard)	38
Canada Country (Billboard)	1
US Billboard Hot 100	32
US Hot Country Songs (Billboard)	3
US Country Airplay (Billboard)	1

=== Year-end charts ===
Chart (2013)	Position
US Country Airplay (Billboard)	30
US Hot Country Songs (Billboard)	37

== Certifications ==
Region	Certification	Certified units/sales
United States (RIAA)	Platinum	673,000
