= Highway Don't Care =

2013 single by Tim McGraw and Taylor Swift

Single by Tim McGraw and Taylor Swift

from the album Two Lanes of Freedom
- Released: March 25, 2013
- Genre: Country
- Length: 4:36
- Label: Big Machine
- Songwriters: Mark Irwin; Josh Kear; Brad Warren; Brett Warren
- Producers: Byron Gallimore; Tim McGraw

Tim McGraw singles chronology
"One of Those Nights" (2013)	"Highway Don't Care" (2013)	"Southern Girl" (2013)

Taylor Swift singles chronology
"22" (2013)	"Highway Don't Care" (2013)	"Red" (2013)

Music video
- "Highway Don't Care" on YouTube

"Highway Don't Care" is a song by the American country music singers Tim McGraw and Taylor Swift, featuring the Australian country singer Keith Urban on guitar. It was released to US country radio on March 25, 2013, as the third single from McGraw's first album for Big Machine Records, Two Lanes of Freedom (2013). The song was written by Mark Irwin, Josh Kear and Brad and Brett Warren. McGraw and Swift recorded their parts separately. "Highway Don't Care" marked Swift's seventh number one hit on Billboard's Country Airplay chart.

== Composition ==
The song is a mid-tempo ballad where the male narrator is separated from his lover who is driving. Throughout the verses, he tells her what he "bets" she is feeling, when a song (sung by Swift) comes on her radio containing the lines "I can't live without you, baby." He also says that the highway she is driving on does not care if she is alone or if she is going home, but he does. The song is in D major with a main chord pattern of D-B_{m}7-G_{sus2}-A. Keith Urban plays lead guitar on it.

== Critical reception ==
In his review of the album, Thom Jurek of AllMusic wrote that "the hook is irresistible and McGraw's vocal, paired with the young singer's, is a perfect match." Chuck Dauphin of Roughstock also reviewed the song favorably, saying that "this song flows well, with winning performances from two of the format's top vocalists." Billy Dukes of Taste of Country gave the song five stars, saying that the track is arguably "one of the best collaborations of the decade – maybe even ever. Each artist brings his or her best effort to the song from McGraw's Two Lanes of Freedom album. 'Highway Don't Care' feels like a special moment from the very first listen, and only becomes more cathartic with time." Jeff Benjamin of Fuse said the track has "major crossover potential". The song was ranked 30th best country song of the 2010s by Taste Of Country.

== Chart performance ==
"Highway Don't Care" debuted at number 13 on the US Billboard Hot Country Songs chart and number 43 on the US Billboard Country Airplay chart for the week of February 23, 2013, due to unsolicited airplay seven weeks before being released to radio. It also debuted at number 59 on the US Billboard Hot 100 and number 23 on the Canadian Hot 100 for the week of February 23, 2013. The single also debuted at number one on the US Billboard Country Digital Songs chart with 86,000 downloads for the week of February 13, 2013. On October 17, 2017, the single was certified triple platinum by the Recording Industry Association of America (RIAA) for combined sales and streaming data of over three million units. As of November 2017, the song has sold 2.3 million copies in the United States.

== Music video ==
The music video was directed by Shane Drake and premiered on May 6, 2013. The music video for the song features Tim McGraw, Taylor Swift, and Keith Urban, as well as actors portraying the song's narrator and his lover. It was made in partnership with Vanderbilt University Medical Center in Nashville, Tennessee and highlights the dangers of driving while distracted, particularly texting and driving. In the video, the narrator's lover mentioned in the song is driving, crying, and texting the narrator. After dropping her phone and trying to retrieve it, she drifts into the wrong lane while reaching across her car and collides with oncoming traffic. She is then airlifted by a Vanderbilt LifeFlight helicopter to Vanderbilt University Medical Center, where she is treated in the Adult Emergency Department. The video implies that she survives as the doctor comes out to see the girl's parents and the narrator, after which they are seen smiling happily and embracing that their daughter's going to be okay.

The structure of the video at first seems to imply that Tim McGraw (as the singer/narrator and a character in the video) is the boyfriend who keeps being texted by the female driver. Upon the LifeFlight helicopter arriving at the hospital, the viewer realizes that Tim McGraw's character is actually the physician who saves the driver's life, and the texts he had been receiving earlier in the video were from the hospital paging/notifying him about this emergency. Taylor Swift was standing in the bedroom-curtain. Keith Urban was standing on the beach.

== Accolades ==
Year	Organization	Award/work	Result	Ref.
2013	American Country Awards	Collaborative Single of the Year	Won	
2013	American Country Awards	Collaborative Video of the Year	Won	
2013	American Country Awards	Song of the Year (Songwriters Award)	Won	
2013	Country Music Association Awards	Musical Event of the Year	Won	
2013	Country Music Association Awards	Music Video of the Year	Won	
2013	Country Music Association Awards	Single of the Year	Nominated	
2014	Academy of Country Music Awards	Video of the Year	Won	
2014	Academy of Country Music Awards	Single Record of the Year	Nominated	
2014	Academy of Country Music Awards	Vocal Event of the Year	Nominated	
2014	BMI Awards	Publisher of the Year	Won	
2014	BMI Awards	Country Awards Top 50 Songs	Won	
2014	CMT Music Awards	Collaborative Video of the Year	Nominated	
2014	CMT Music Awards	Video of the Year	Nominated	
2014	iHeartRadio Music Awards	Country Song of the Year	Nominated	
2014	Grammy Awards	Best Country Duo/Group Performance	Nominated	
2014	CMC Music Awards	International Video of the Year	Won	

== Official versions ==
- Album version (4:36)
- Radio edit (4:14)
- Duet with Brazilian singer Paula Fernandes, a Porglish version (4:38)

== Charts ==
=== Weekly charts ===
Weekly chart performance for "Highway Don't Care"
Chart (2013)	Peak position
Australia (ARIA)	73
Canada Hot 100 (Billboard)	21
Canada Country (Billboard)	2
US Billboard Hot 100	22
US Country Airplay (Billboard)	1
US Hot Country Songs (Billboard)	4

=== Year-end charts ===
Year-end chart performance for "Highway Don't Care"
Chart (2013)	Position
Canada (Canadian Hot 100)	81
US Billboard Hot 100	77
US Country Airplay (Billboard)	32
US Hot Country Songs (Billboard)	6

== Certifications ==
Certifications for "Highway Don't Care"
Region	Certification	Certified units/sales
Australia (ARIA)	Platinum	70,000^{‡}
New Zealand (RMNZ)	Gold	15,000^{‡}
United States (RIAA)	3× Platinum	3,000,000^{‡}
^{‡} Sales+streaming figures based on certification alone.
