= Two Lanes of Freedom =

Studio album by Tim McGraw
- Released: February 5, 2013
- Studios: Blackbird Studio (Nashville, Tennessee); Essential Sound Studio (Franklin, Tennessee); Ocean Way Recording (Hollywood, California); Mix L.A. (Tarzana, California)
- Genre: Country
- Length: 45:50
- Label: Big Machine
- Producers: Byron Gallimore; Tim McGraw

Tim McGraw chronology
Tim McGraw & Friends (2013)	Two Lanes of Freedom (2013)	Sundown Heaven Town (2014)

Singles from Two Lanes of Freedom
- 1. "Truck Yeah" Released: July 3, 2012; 2. "One of Those Nights" Released: November 12, 2012; 3. "Highway Don't Care" Released: March 25, 2013; 4. "Southern Girl" Released: July 8, 2013

Two Lanes of Freedom is the twelfth studio album by the American country music singer Tim McGraw. It was released on February 5, 2013, as his first album for Big Machine Records following twenty years with Curb Records. He co-produced the album with Byron Gallimore, the producer of his previously released albums. The album includes the singles "Truck Yeah", "One of Those Nights", "Highway Don't Care" with Taylor Swift and "Southern Girl".

== Background ==
McGraw told The Boot writer Beville Dunkerley about the lawsuit that allowed him to end his decades-long contract with Curb Records and the making of the album. "Nothing good happens from anything without concentrating on what you do musically,... All this other stuff you can't do anything about...You can't make people do the things that you think are right, but you can make your music the way you want to make your music and that's what I concentrate on." Of his "mindset" behind the album, he said, "There's something special about this record to me, in the optimism that it has,...I'm looking forward to more stuff than I've ever had happen before; there's more ahead of me than behind me. I feel like I've grabbed another gear." He added what he sees in his future as a music artist, "I don't think I'm anywhere close to doing the things I want to do. There's so much more ahead of me, and I have a lot of room to get better... Sonically, there's a freshness to this record and a drive behind it that is new to me and headed in a different place. But I won't know that until I go into the studio for the next record and see where it takes me."

== Reception ==
=== Critical ===
Professional ratings
Aggregate scores
Source	Rating
Metacritic	(66/100)
Review scores
Source	Rating
AllMusic	3.5/5 stars
American Songwriter	3.5/5 stars
Country Universe	2.5/5 stars
Los Angeles Times	2/4 stars
The Oakland Press	3/4 stars
Omaha World-Herald	2/4 stars
PopMatters	5/10 stars
Rolling Stone	3/5 stars
Roughstock	4/5 stars
Taste of Country	4/5 stars
USA Today	3.5/4 stars

On release, Two Lanes of Freedom received generally positive reviews from most music critics. At Metacritic, which assigns a normalized rating out of 100 to reviews from mainstream critics, the album received an average score of 66, based on 9 reviews, which indicates "generally favorable reviews". The album had positive reviews from AllMusic, American Songwriter, Country Weekly, The Lantern The Plain Dealer, Roughstock, Taste of Country and USA Today. On the other hand, the album received mixed reviews from Country Universe, Los Angeles Times, Omaha World-Herald, PopMatters and Rolling Stone.

=== Commercial ===
Two Lanes of Freedom sold approximately 107,000 copies during its first week of release, reaching No. 1 on the country albums chart and No. 2 on the Billboard 200. By September 18, 2013, the album had sold 421,000 copies.

== Track listing ==
All tracks are produced by Byron Gallimore and Tim McGraw.

Standard edition
No.	Title	Writer(s)	Length
1.	"Two Lanes of Freedom"	Jaren Johnston, Jennifer Schott	4:26
2.	"One of Those Nights"	Luke Laird, Rodney Clawson, Chris Tompkins	3:56
3.	"Friend of a Friend"	Mark Irwin, Josh Kear, Andrew Dorff	5:13
4.	"Southern Girl"	Johnston, Clawson, Lee Thomas Miller	4:15
5.	"Truck Yeah"	Chris Janson, Danny Myrick, Preston Brust, Chris Lucas	3:29
6.	"Nashville Without You"	Kyle Jacobs, Joe Leathers, Ruston Kelly	3:37
7.	"Book of John"	Jon Nite, Greg Becker	3:28
8.	"Mexicoma"	James T. Slater, Brad Warren, Brett Warren	3:33
9.	"Number 37405"	Tom Douglas, Troy Jones	4:45
10.	"It's Your World"	Scott Stepakoff, Josh Osborne, Shane McAnally	4:29
11.	"Highway Don't Care" (with Taylor Swift featuring Keith Urban)	Irwin, Kear, Brad Warren, Brett Warren	4:36
Total length:			45:50

Accelerated deluxe edition
No.	Title	Writer(s)	Length
1.	"Two Lanes of Freedom"	Jaren Johnston, Jenn Schott	4:26
2.	"One of Those Nights"	Luke Laird, Rodney Clawson, Chris Tompkins	3:56
3.	"Friend of a Friend"	Mark Irwin, Josh Kear, Andrew Dorff	5:13
4.	"Southern Girl"	Johnston, Clawson, Lee Thomas Miller	4:15
5.	"Truck Yeah"	Chris Janson, Danny Myrick, Preston Brust, Chris Lucas	3:29
6.	"Nashville Without You"	Kyle Jacobs, Joe Leathers, Ruston Kelly	3:37
7.	"Book of John"	Jon Nite, Greg Becker	3:28
8.	"Annie I Owe You a Dance"	James T. Slater, Tom Douglas	3:44
9.	"Mexicoma"	Slater, Brad Warren, Brett Warren	3:33
10.	"Number 37405"	Douglas, Troy Jones	4:45
11.	"It's Your World"	Scott Stepakoff, Josh Osborne, Shane McAnally	4:29
12.	"Tinted Windows"	Irwin, Kear, Dorff	4:13
13.	"Highway Don't Care" (featuring Taylor Swift, with Keith Urban on guitar)	Irwin, Kear, Brad Warren, Brett Warren	4:36
14.	"Truck Yeah" (live)	Janson, Myrick, Brust, Lucas	4:16
15.	"Let Me Love It Out of You"	Rachel Thibodeau, Jason Sever, David Tolliver	5:34
Total length:			63:37

== Personnel ==
=== Musicians ===
- Tim McGraw – vocals
- Jamie Muhoberac – keyboards
- Steve Nathan – acoustic piano, Wurlitzer electric piano, organ, synthesizers
- Mike Rojas – accordion (9)
- David Levita – electric guitar, acoustic guitar (1)
- Michael Landau – electric guitar, guitar solo (3)
- Ilya Toshinsky – acoustic guitar, resonator guitar (1, 7)
- Bryan Sutton – acoustic guitar (4, 6, 11), mandolin (4, 6, 11), banjo (5)
- Keith Urban – electric guitar (13)
- Dan Dugmore – steel guitar, lap steel guitar
- Paul Bushnell – bass guitar
- Shannon Forrest – drums, percussion
- Byron Gallimore – percussion (6), backing vocals (9)
- Marty Krystall – clarinet (9)
- Lee Thornburg – trumpet (9)
- William Roper – tuba (9)
- David Campbell – string arrangements (3, 7, 8, 10, 12), horn arrangements (9)
- The Nashville String Machine – strings (3, 7, 8, 10, 12)
- Greg Barnhill – backing vocals
- Joanna Cotten – backing vocals (2, 11)
- Chris Rodriguez – backing vocals (12)
- Taylor Swift – vocals (13)

Musicians on "Truck Yeah (Live)"

- Tim McGraw – lead vocals
- Billy Nobel – keyboards, backing vocals
- Adam Shoenfeld – electric guitar
- Denny Hemingson – Melobar guitar
- Deano Brown – fiddle, backing vocals
- John Marcus – bass guitar
- Shawn Fichter – drums

=== Production ===
- Byron Gallimore – producer, mixing (15)
- Tim McGraw – producer
- Julian King – recording (1–13), string recording (3, 7)
- Heath Stimmel – recording (14)
- Steve Churchyard – string recording (8, 10, 12), horn recording (9)
- Chris Lord-Alge – mixing (1–14)
- Stephen Allbritten – additional recording (1–14), recording assistant (1–14)
- Erik Lutkins – additional recording (1–14), mix assistant (15)
- David Bryant – recording assistant (1–13), string recording assistant (3, 7)
- Lowell Reynolds – recording assistant (1–13)
- Andrew Schubert – additional mixing (1–14), mix assistant (1–14)
- Brad Townsend – additional mixing (1–14), mix assistant (1–14)
- Keith Armstrong – mix assistant (1–14)
- Nik Karpen – mix assistant (1–14)
- Ted Jensen – mastering at Sterling Sound (New York City, New York)
- Sandi Spika Borchetta – creative director
- Kelly Clauge – creative director
- Glenn Sweitzer – art direction, design
- Nigel Parry – photography

== Chart performance ==
=== Weekly charts ===
Chart (2013–2014)	Peak position
Australian Albums (ARIA)	10
Canadian Albums Chart	4
China Album Chart	18
US Billboard 200	2
US Billboard Top Country Albums	1
US Billboard Top Digital Albums	1
UK Albums Chart	43
UK Country Albums (Official Charts)	1

=== Year-end charts ===
Chart (2013)	Position
US Billboard 200	58
US Top Country Albums (Billboard)	14

Chart (2014)	Position
US Top Country Albums (Billboard)	75

=== Singles ===
Year	Single	Peak chart positions				
Year	Single	US Country	US Country Airplay	US	CAN Country	CAN
2012	"Truck Yeah"	11	10	57	—	52
2012	"One of Those Nights"	3	1	32	1	38
2013	"Highway Don't Care"	4	1	22	2	21
2013	"Southern Girl"	4	2	42	1	61
"—" denotes releases that did not chart

== Certifications ==
Region	Certification	Certified units/sales
Canada (Music Canada)	Gold	40,000^{^}
United States (RIAA)	Gold	500,000^{^}
^{^} Shipments figures based on certification alone.
