= Southern Girl =

Single by Tim McGraw

from the album Two Lanes of Freedom
- Released: July 8, 2013
- Genre: Country
- Length: 4:15
- Label: Big Machine
- Songwriters: Jaren Johnston; Rodney Clawson; Lee Thomas Miller
- Producers: Byron Gallimore; Tim McGraw

Tim McGraw singles chronology
"Highway Don't Care" (2013)	"Southern Girl" (2013)	"Lookin' for That Girl" (2014)

"Southern Girl" is a song written by Jaren Johnston, Rodney Clawson, and Lee Thomas Miller and recorded by American country music artist Tim McGraw. It was released in July 2013 as the fourth single from McGraw's album Two Lanes of Freedom.

== Content ==
The song is about girls from the south and how the narrator finds them attractive.

== Critical reception ==
Billy Dukes of Taste of Country gave the song 4.5 stars out of 5, saying that "[its] overall feel is one that’s repeated each summer, but few have brought it back as effortlessly as McGraw in recent years." Giving it a "B", Joseph Hudak of Country Weekly gave it a "B" grade, and said that "[the song]'d all feel a little trite and disposable if [it] didn't have a monster groove to prop it up." He also said that the song was "utterly singable" and "the ideal summer anthem".

== Music video ==
The accompanying music video for the song was directed by Shane Drake and premiered in July 2013.

== Chart performance ==
"Southern Girl" debuted at number 57 on the US Billboard Country Airplay chart for the week of July 13, 2013. It also debuted at number 44 on Hot Country Songs. It debuted at number 100 on the Billboard Hot 100 on the week of August 10, 2013. It also debuted at number 96 on the Canadian Hot 100 for the week of August 24, 2013. As of January 2014, the song has over sold 526,000 copies in the United States.

Chart (2013)	Peak position
Canada Hot 100 (Billboard)	61
Canada Country (Billboard)	1
US Billboard Hot 100	42
US Hot Country Songs (Billboard)	4
US Country Airplay (Billboard)	2

=== Year-end charts ===
Chart (2013)	Position
US Country Airplay (Billboard)	12
US Hot Country Songs (Billboard)	41

== Certifications ==
Region	Certification	Certified units/sales
United States (RIAA)	Platinum	1,000,000^{‡}
^{‡} Sales+streaming figures based on certification alone.
