= Sundown Heaven Town =

Studio album by Tim McGraw
- Released: September 16, 2014
- Studios: Blackbird Studio and Ocean Way Nashville (Nashville, Tennessee)
- Genre: Country
- Length: 50:08
- Label: Big Machine
- Producers: Byron Gallimore; Tim McGraw

Tim McGraw chronology
Two Lanes of Freedom (2013)	Sundown Heaven Town (2014)	Damn Country Music (2015)

Singles from Sundown Heaven Town
- 1. "Lookin' for That Girl" Released: January 13, 2014; 2. "Meanwhile Back at Mama's" Released: April 14, 2014; 3. "Shotgun Rider" Released: September 8, 2014; 4. "Diamond Rings and Old Barstools" Released: January 26, 2015

Sundown Heaven Town is the thirteenth studio album by American country music artist Tim McGraw. It was released on September 16, 2014, by Big Machine Records.

== Content ==
The album has produced two singles in advance of its release: "Lookin' for That Girl" and "Meanwhile Back at Mama's", the latter of which features backing vocals from McGraw's wife, Faith Hill. These singles peaked at numbers 15 and 2, respectively, on the Billboard Country Airplay chart. "Shotgun Rider" was released as the album's third single and became a Number One hit on the Billboard Country Airplay charts. McGraw previously recorded a different song also entitled "Shotgun Rider" on his 2007 album Let It Go. "Diamond Rings and Old Barstools was released as the album's fourth and final single in 2015 and reached the Top 5.

McGraw produced the album with Byron Gallimore, who has produced all of his albums. In an interview with Country Weekly, McGraw stated that, ""I think it’s a good microcosm of what my 20 or so years in music have been, in a lot of ways. You can certainly hear parts of my career throughout all of these songs, as well as the future and where my music is headed. To me, the title of the album is all about that time where you stop doing what you have to do, and start doing what you want to do."

McGraw revealed the album's cover art and track listing on July 28, 2014. One day later, the album was made available for preorder via Amazon MP3 and the iTunes Store.

== Critical reception ==
Professional ratings
Aggregate scores
Source	Rating
Metacritic	71/100
Review scores
Source	Rating
AllMusic	3.5/5 stars
Billboard	88/100
Newsday	B+
Rolling Stone	3/5 stars
USA Today	3/4 stars
Vice (Expert Witness)	(1-star Honorable Mention)

Sundown Heaven Town received positive reviews from critics. According to Metacritic, where they assign a weighted average score out of 100 to ratings and reviews from mainstream critics, Sundown Heaven Town received an average of 71, based on 4 reviews, indicating "generally favorable reviews". Writing for AllMusic, Stephen Thomas Erlewine suggested the music "come[s] on smooth and easy but have the foundation to last." Chuck Dauphin saying for Billboard how "the singer stretches a little more than usual... and takes a few musical chances." On behalf of USA Today, Jerry Shriver commenting how the project contains "many wise nuggets on the vet's solid outing." Glenn Gamboa stating for Newsday how it is an "Eclectic collection of country styles that brings (usually) great results." Writing for Rolling Stone, Will Hermes opined "its hit-or-miss" with this project that's "best when he's feeling your pain." On behalf of The Boston Globe, Sarah Rodman found "a solid effort featuring a few stand-out tracks, slightly better than average radio fare, and some pleasant filler", which is done in "a creditable job of sidestepping any naked pandering to trends, balancing authentic country atmosphere with pop polish."

== Track listing ==
Sundown Heaven Town — Standard edition
No.	Title	Writer(s)	Length
1.	"Overrated"	Shane McAnally, Josh Osborne, Rivers Rutherford	3:28
2.	"City Lights"	Deric Ruttan, Jonathan Singleton	4:19
3.	"Shotgun Rider"	Marv Green, Hillary Lindsey, Troy Verges	3:56
4.	"Dust"	Rhett Akins, Rodney Clawson, Ben Hayslip	3:46
5.	"Diamond Rings and Old Barstools" (with Catherine Dunn)	Barry Dean, Singleton, Luke Laird,	3:18
6.	"Words Are Medicine"	Tom Douglas, David Hodges, Zac Maloy	4:32
7.	"Sick of Me"	Andrew Dorff, Singleton	4:05
8.	"Meanwhile Back at Mama's" (featuring Faith Hill)	Douglas, Jaren Johnston, Jeffrey Steele	3:47
9.	"Keep On Truckin'"	Blair Daly, Tim McGraw, Brad Warren, Brett Warren	3:06
10.	"Last Turn Home"	Eric Arjes, Ryan Hurd, Maren Morris	3:56
11.	"Portland, Maine"	Abe Stoklasa, Donovan Woods	3:43
12.	"Lookin' for That Girl"	Mark Irwin, James T. Slater, Chris Tompkins	4:20
13.	"Still on the Line"	Bob DiPiero, Jon Nite, Steven McMorran	3:52

Sundown Heaven Town — Deluxe edition bonus tracks
No.	Title	Writer(s)	Length
14.	"Lincoln Continentals and Cadillacs" (featuring Kid Rock)	Clawson, Laird	4:20
15.	"Kids Today"	Daly, Brad Warren, Brett Warren	4:12
16.	"I'm Feelin' You"	Derek George, Brad Warren, Brett Warren	3:27
17.	"The View"	Eric Frederic, Crista Russo, Joe Spargur	3:42
18.	"Black Jacket"	Daly, Brad Warren, Brett Warren	4:12

== Personnel ==
=== Musicians ===
- Tim McGraw – lead vocals
- Jamie Muhoberac – keyboards
- Steve Nathan – keyboards (1–7, 10, 11, 13–15, 18)
- David Levita – electric guitar, additional acoustic guitar (16)
- Michael Landau – electric guitar (1–7, 9, 11, 12, 15–18)
- Ilya Toshinsky – acoustic guitar (1–9, 11, 12, 15, 17, 18), banjo (1–9, 11, 12, 15, 17, 18), mandolin (1–9, 11, 12, 15, 17, 18)
- Dan Dugmore – steel guitar (1–13, 15–18), additional acoustic guitar (2), dobro (8)
- Byron Gallimore – additional electric guitar (3), additional backing vocals (4), additional keyboards (8, 17, 18)
- Bryan Sutton – additional acoustic guitar (10, 13, 14), additional banjo (10)
- Paul Bushnell – bass
- Shannon Forrest – drums, percussion, loop programming (4, 7, 9)
- Erik Lutkins – loop programming (4, 9, 12, 15–17)
- David Campbell – string arrangements and conductor (6, 15)
- Suzie Katayama – string contractor (6, 15)
- Dave Stone – acoustic bass (6, 15)
- John Acosta – cello (6, 15)
- Timothy Landauer – cello (6, 15)
- Steve Richards – cello (6, 15)
- Robert Brophy – viola (6, 15)
- Luke Maurer – viola (6, 15)
- Dave Walther – viola (6, 15)
- Charlie Bisharat – violin (6, 15), concertmaster (6, 15)
- Julian Hallmark – violin (6, 15)
- Tamara Hallmark – violin (6, 15)
- Songa Lee – violin (6, 15)
- Alyssa Park – violin (6, 15)
- Tereza Stanislov – violin (6, 15)
- Sarah Thornblade – violin (6, 15)
- Josefina Vergara – violin (6, 15)
- Shalini Vajayan – violin (6, 15)
- John Wittenberg – violin (6, 15)
- Greg Barnhill – backing vocals (1–4, 6, 7, 9–18)
- Catherine Dunn – backing vocals (5)
- Faith Hill – backing vocals (8)
- Perry Coleman – additional backing vocals (10, 14)
- Herschel Boone – additional backing vocals (14)
- Kid Rock – lead vocals (14)

=== Production ===
- Byron Gallimore – producer, mixing
- Tim McGraw – producer
- Julian King – recording
- Stephen Allbritten – additional recording, editing
- Erik Lutkins – additional recording, editing, recording (8, 9, 12, 16, 17)
- Mike E. Clark – additional recording (14)
- David Bryant – recording assistant (1)
- Ernesto Olivera – recording assistant (1)
- Steve Churchyard – string engineer (6, 15)
- Scott Moore – assistant string engineer (6, 15)
- Adam Ayan – mastering at Gateway Mastering (Portland, Maine)
- Sandi Spika Borchetta – creative director
- Kelly Clauge – creative director
- Karri Bowman – art producer
- Nick Egan – art direction, design
- Nino Muñoz – photography

== Chart performance ==
The album debuted at number 1 on the Billboard Country Albums Chart and at number 3 on the Billboard 200, selling over 71,000 copies. The album has sold 299,000 copies in the US as of September 2015.

The album also debuted at number 3 on the Canadian Albums Chart, with 5,500 copies sold in its first week.

=== Weekly charts ===
Chart (2014–15)	Peak position
Canadian Albums (Billboard)	3
UK Country Albums Chart (Official Charts Company)	1
UK Albums Chart (Official Charts Company)	72
US Billboard 200	3
US Top Country Albums (Billboard)	1

=== Year-end charts ===
Chart (2014)	Position
US Billboard 200	128
US Top Country Albums (Billboard)	28

Chart (2015)	Position
US Billboard 200	128
US Top Country Albums (Billboard)	28

=== Singles ===
Year	Single	Peak chart positions				
Year	Single	US Country	US Country Airplay	US	CAN Country	CAN
2014	"Lookin' for That Girl"	18	15	85	30	47
2014	"Meanwhile Back at Mama's"	7	2	41	1	47
2014	"Shotgun Rider"	1	1	38	1	54
2015	"Diamond Rings and Old Barstools"	11	3	55	10	78
