= Reflected: Greatest Hits Vol. 2 =

Greatest hits album by Tim McGraw
- Released: March 28, 2006
- Genre: Country
- Length: 68:38
- Label: Curb
- Producer: Byron Gallimore; Tim McGraw; The Neptunes; Darran Smith; James Stroud

Tim McGraw chronology
Live Like You Were Dying (2004)	Reflected: Greatest Hits Vol. 2 (2006)	Let It Go (2007)

Singles from Reflected: Greatest Hits Vol. 2
- 1. "When the Stars Go Blue" Released: March 6, 2006; 2. "My Little Girl" Released: August 7, 2006

Professional ratings
Review scores
Source	Rating
Allmusic	3/5 stars

Reflected: Greatest Hits Vol. 2 is the second compilation album by American country music singer Tim McGraw, the first having been released in 2000. It was released on March 28, 2006.

Most of the tracks were recorded after the release of Greatest Hits, with the addition of two pre-2000 hits that were not on the first album — the No. 1 hits "Not a Moment Too Soon" (1994) and "Everywhere" (1997) — and four new tracks.

The album entered U.S. Billboard 200 chart at number two, selling about 242,000 copies in its first week. It entered Billboard's Top Country Albums chart at number one. On November 14, 2007, the album was certified 2× Platinum in the US.

== Track listing ==
No.	Title	Writer(s)	Length
1.	"Live Like You Were Dying"	Tim Nichols, Craig Wiseman	5:00
2.	"My Old Friend"	Wiseman, Steve McEwan	3:38
3.	"Like We Never Loved at All" (duet with Faith Hill)	John Rich, Vicky McGehee, Scot Sax	4:17
4.	"The Cowboy in Me"	Al Anderson, Wiseman, Jeffrey Steele	4:03
5.	"When the Stars Go Blue"	Ryan Adams	3:55^{A}
6.	"Real Good Man"	Rivers Rutherford, George Teren	4:16
7.	"She's My Kind of Rain"	Tommy Lee James, Robin Lerner	4:17
8.	"Grown Men Don't Cry"	Tom Douglas, Steve Seskin	3:56
9.	"Not a Moment Too Soon"	Joe Barnhill, Wayne Perry	3:48
10.	"Watch the Wind Blow By"	Anders Osborne, Dylan Altman	4:37
11.	"Over and Over" (duet with Nelly)	Tim McGraw, Nelly, Jason Bridges, James D. "Sted Fast" Hargroves II	4:16
12.	"Everywhere"	Mike Reid, Wiseman	4:51
13.	"Beautiful People"	Wiseman, Chris Lindsey	4:59^{A}
14.	"Red Ragtop"	Jason White	4:44
15.	"My Little Girl"	McGraw, Douglas	3:39^{A, B}
16.	"I've Got Friends That Do"	McGraw, Brett Beavers, Brad Warren, Brett Warren	4:13^{A}

- ^{A} - Previously unreleased.
- ^{B} - Featured in the movie Flicka.

== Personnel ==
Musicians (Tracks 5, 13, 15 & 16)

- Tim McGraw – vocals
- Jeff McMahon – keyboards
- Denny Hemingson – electric guitar, baritone guitar, slide guitar, steel guitar, dobro, Melobar guitar
- Bob Miner – acoustic guitar, banjo, mandolin
- Darran Smith – acoustic guitar, electric guitar
- John Marcus – bass guitar
- Billy Mason – drums
- David Dunkley – percussion
- Dean Brown – fiddle, mandolin
- David Campbell – string arrangements

== Charts ==
Reflected: Greatest Hits Vol. 2 entered the US Billboard 200 chart at number two, his ninth top ten debut, and entered the Top Country Albums chart at number one, his eighth number one.

=== Weekly charts ===
Chart (2006)	Peak position
Australian Albums (ARIA)	69
Canadian Albums (Billboard)	3
US Billboard 200	2
US Top Country Albums (Billboard)	1

=== Year-end charts ===
Chart (2006)	Position
US Billboard 200	28
US Top Country Albums (Billboard)	7

Chart (2007)	Position
US Billboard 200	81
US Top Country Albums (Billboard)	18

Chart (2008)	Position
US Top Country Albums (Billboard)	62

== Sales and certifications ==
Region	Certification	Certified units/sales
Canada (Music Canada)	Platinum	100,000^{^}
United States (RIAA)	2× Platinum	2,000,000^{^}
^{^} Shipments figures based on certification alone.
