= List of number-one country singles (Canada) =

This is a list of number-one country songs in Canada by year from the RPM Country Tracks chart (1964–2000), Radio & Records Canada Country Top 30 (2004–2009; although it would be replaced as the main chart with the following chart), and Billboard Canada Country chart (2006–present).

== RPM (1964–2000) ==
- 1964
- 1965
- 1966
- 1967
- 1968
- 1969
- 1970
- 1971
- 1972
- 1973
- 1974
- 1975
- 1976
- 1977
- 1978
- 1979
- 1980
- 1981
- 1982
- 1983
- 1984
- 1985
- 1986
- 1987
- 1988
- 1989
- 1990
- 1991
- 1992
- 1993
- 1994
- 1995
- 1996
- 1997
- 1998
- 1999
- 2000

== Radio & Records (2004–2005) ==
- 2004
- 2005

== Billboard (2006–2024) ==
- 2006
- 2007
- 2008
- 2009
- 2010
- 2011
- 2012
- 2013
- 2014
- 2015
- 2016
- 2017
- 2018
- 2019
- 2020
- 2021
- 2022
- 2023
- 2024

== See also ==
- List of number-one country hits (United States)
- List of number-one country albums (Canada)
- List of years in country music
