= 40th Academy of Country Music Awards =

US music awards ceremony in 2005

- Date: May 17, 2005
- Location: Mandalay Bay Events Center, Las Vegas, Nevada
- Hosted by: Brooks & Dunn

Highlights
- Most wins: Alison Krauss; Brad Paisley; Keith Urban; Gretchen Wilson; (2 each)
- Most nominations: Kenny Chesney; Tim McGraw; Keith Urban; Gretchen Wilson; (5 each)

Television/radio coverage
- Network: CBS

The 40th Academy of Country Music Awards were held on May 17, 2005, at the Mandalay Bay Events Center at the Mandalay Bay Resort & Casino in Paradise, Nevada.

== Winners and nominees ==
Winners are shown in bold.

Entertainer of the Year	Album of the Year
**Kenny Chesney**; Brooks & Dunn; Toby Keith; Tim McGraw; Keith Urban	**Be Here — Keith Urban**; Here For The Party — Gretchen Wilson; Live Like You Were Dying — Tim McGraw; Restless — Sara Evans; When The Sun Goes Down — Kenny Chesney
Top Female Vocalist of the Year	Top Male Vocalist of the Year
**Gretchen Wilson**; Terri Clark; Sara Evans; Martina McBride; Lee Ann Womack	**Keith Urban**; Kenny Chesney; Alan Jackson; Toby Keith; Tim McGraw
Top Vocal Group of the Year	Top Vocal Duo of the Year
**Rascal Flatts**; Alison Krauss & Union Station; Diamond Rio; Lonestar; The Notorious Cherry Bombs	**Brooks & Dunn**; Big & Rich; Blue County; Montgomery Gentry; The Warren Brothers
Single Record of the Year	Song of the Year
**"Live Like You Were Dying" — Tim McGraw**; "Bless The Broken Road" — Rascal Flatts; "Days Go By" — Keith Urban; "I May Hate Myself In The Morning" — Lee Ann Womack; "Redneck Woman" — Gretchen Wilson; "Whiskey Lullaby" — Brad Paisley and Alison Krauss	**"Live Like You Were Dying" — Craig Wiseman and Tim Nichols**; "American Soldier" — Toby Keith and Chuck Cannon; "Bless The Broken Road" — Marcus Hummon, Bobby Boyd and Jeff Hanna; "I May Hate Myself In The Morning" — Odie Blackmon; "Whiskey Lullaby" — Bill Anderson and Jon Randall
Top New Artist of the Year	Video of the Year
**Gretchen Wilson**; Big & Rich; Josh Gracin; Julie Roberts; Josh Turner	**"Whiskey Lullaby" — Brad Paisley and Alison Krauss**; "Girls Lie Too" — Terri Clark; "Live Like You Were Dying" — Tim McGraw; "Redneck Woman" — Gretchen Wilson; "Save A Horse (Ride A Cowboy)" — Big & Rich
Vocal Event of the Year
**"Whiskey Lullaby" — Brad Paisley and Alison Krauss**; "Creepin' In" — Norah Jones And Dolly Parton; "Hey Good Lookin'" — Jimmy Buffett, Clint Black, Kenny Chesney, Alan Jackson, Toby Keith, and George Strait; "Party For Two" — Shania Twain and Billy Currington; "When The Sun Goes Down" — Kenny Chesney and Uncle Kracker

== Performers ==
Performer(s)	Song(s)
Gretchen Wilson	"Here for the Party"
Keith Urban	"Days Go By"
Montgomery Gentry	"Gone"
Reba McEntire	"My Sister"
Big & Rich	"Big Time"
Lee Ann Womack	"I May Hate Myself in the Morning"
Kenny Chesney	"Anything but Mine"
Rascal Flatts	"Fast Cars and Freedom"
Dierks Bentley	"Lot of Leavin' Left to Do"
Sara Evans	"A Real Fine Place to Start"
Brad Paisley	"Alcohol"
Brooks & Dunn	"Play Something Country"
Toby Keith	"As Good as I Once Was"
Alan Jackson	"The Talkin' Song Repair Blues"
Faith Hill	"Mississippi Girl"
Tim McGraw	"Drugs or Jesus"
Miranda Lambert	"Kerosene"
Sugarland	"Baby Girl"

== Presenters ==
Presenter(s)	Notes
Phil McGraw; Robin McGraw	Video of the Year
Reba McEntire	Keith Urban performance
Van Zant	Montgomery Gentry performance
Michelle Stafford; Josh Gracin	Single Record of the Year
Cowboy Troy	Big & Rich performance
Josh Turner; Buddy Jewell	Album of the Year
Darryl Worley	Lee Ann Womack performance
Mark Miller	Kenny Chesney performance
Julie Roberts; Joe Nichols	Song of the Year
Sterling Marlin	Rascal Flatts performance
Deana Carter	Vocal Event of the Year
Tracy Lawrence	Dierks Bentley performance
Jamie O'Neal; Marty Roe; Dana Williams	Top New Artist of the Year
Garth Brooks	Pioneer Award to Chris LeDoux
Blaine Larsen	Brad Paisley performance
Neal McCoy; Bob Schneider	Top Vocal Group of the Year
Craig Morgan; Emily Procter	Toby Keith performance
Trick Pony	Top Vocal Duo of the Year
Lonestar	Present Home Depot Humanitarian Award for Neal McCoy
Brett Warren	Tim McGraw performance
Rick Schroder	Top Female Vocalist of the Year
Terri Clark; Phil Vassar	Top Male Vocalist of the Year
Barbara Mandrell	Entertainer of the Year
