= List of number-one country singles of 2004 (Canada) =

Canada Country was a chart that was published weekly by Radio & Records magazine. It was first published on April 16, 2004, when Radio & Records introduced five airplay charts for the Canadian market, country being one of them. It was the first record chart Canadians had for country music since RPM ceased publication in November 2000. This 30-position chart listed the most popular country music songs, calculated weekly by airplay from 21 Canadian stations as monitored by Mediabase Research. It finished for the year on December 17. Like most music charts, the Canada Country Top 30 had a rule when songs entered recurrent rotation. A song entered recurrent if it had been on the chart for 20 weeks or more and is ranked below number 15. This was the country music chart Canada had before Billboard magazine started their version of Canada Country in July 2006.

Seven artists topped the chart this year. Technically, the first number one hit of the year was "When the Sun Goes Down" by Kenny Chesney and Uncle Kracker, but this is due to the chart only beginning publishing on April 16. Chesney would score another number one hit with "I Go Back". The only other artist to score multiple number one hits this year was Tim McGraw, with "Live Like You Were Dying" and "Back When". Keith Urban, Lonestar, and Gretchen Wilson also each scored a multiple-week number one single. LeAnn Rimes would achieve the final number one hit of the year with "Nothin' 'bout Love Makes Sense", which was her first number one single in Canada since "Blue" spent a single week at number one back in 1996. Despite not topping the weekly chart, Canadian artist Terri Clark had the number-one year-end song with "Girls Lie Too".

These are the Canadian number-one country songs of 2004, per the R&R Canada Country Top 30. Note that no issues were published on December 17 and December 24.

== Number ones ==
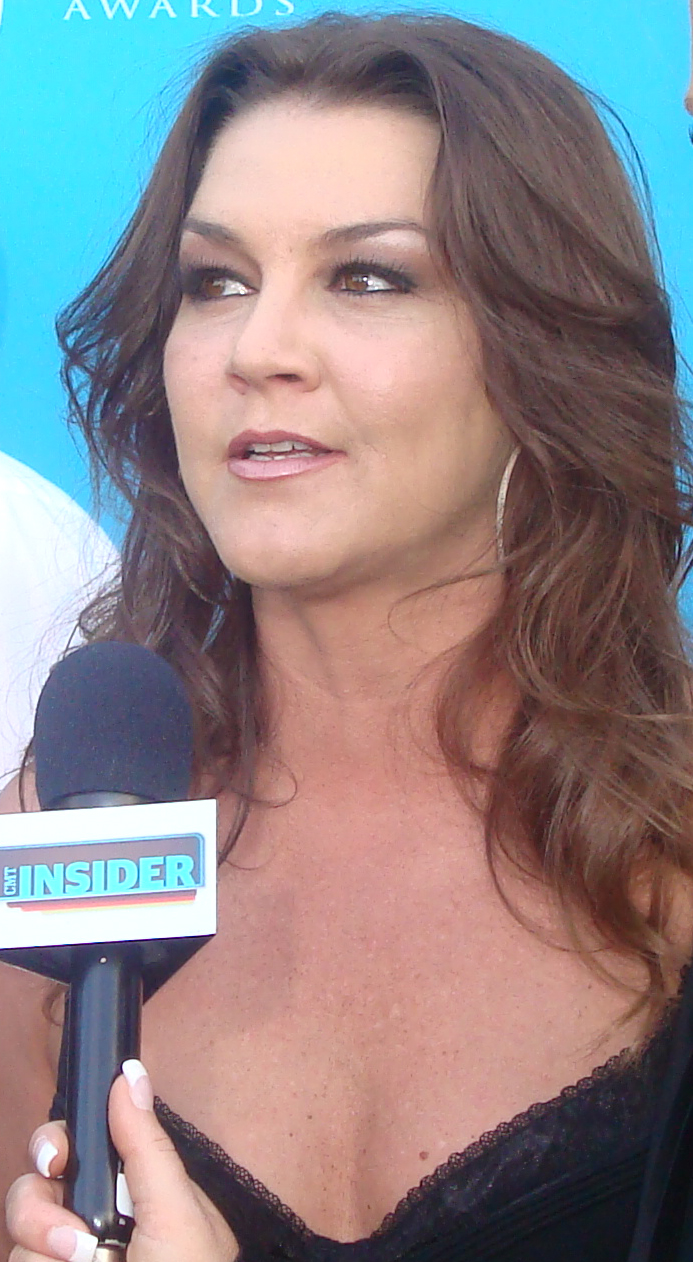
Gretchen Wilson tied with both Tim McGraw and Lonestar for the longest running number one hit of the year, spending 7 weeks atop with "Redneck Woman".

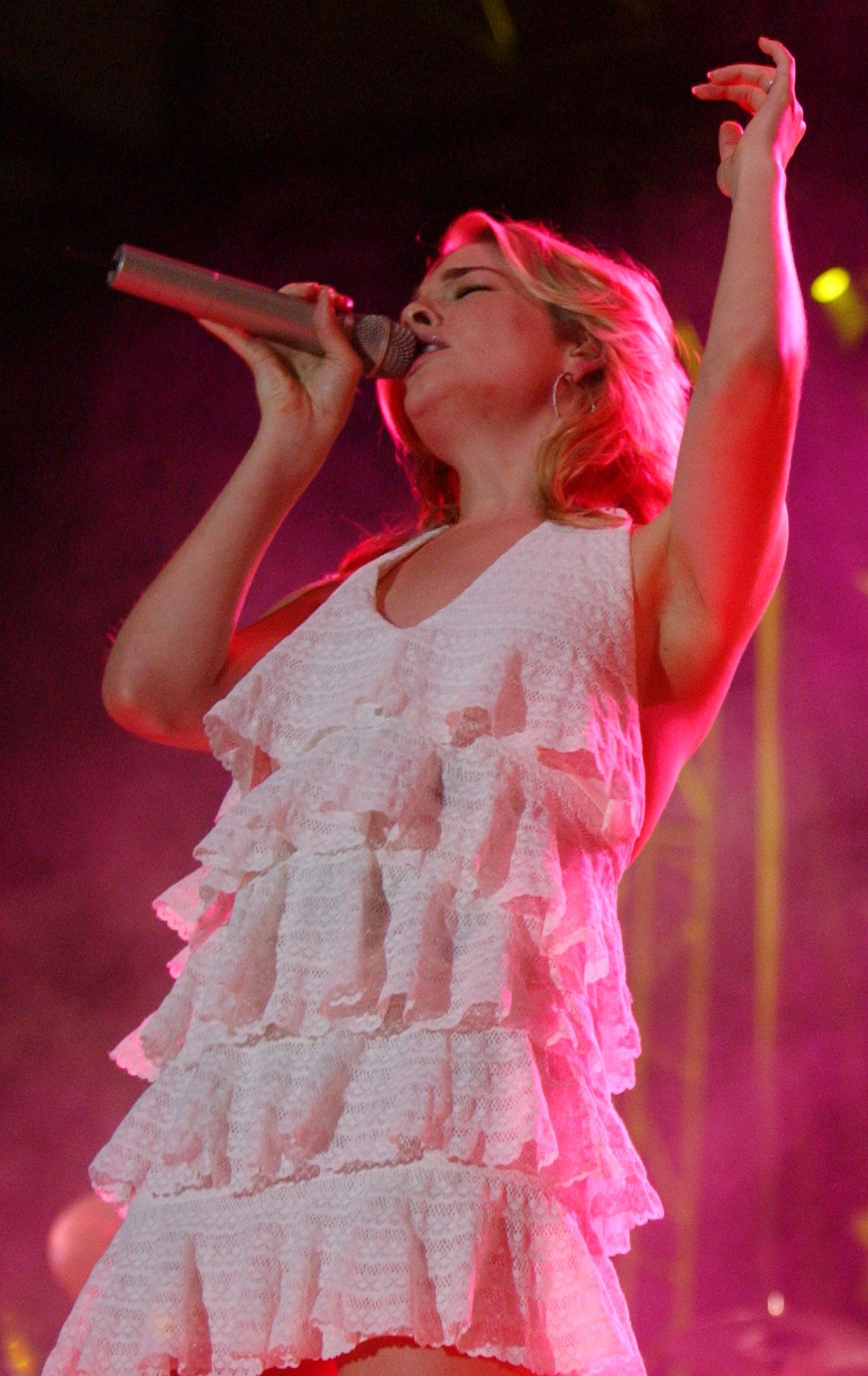
LeAnn Rimes finished the year with "Nothin' 'bout Love Makes Sense", her first number one hit in Canada since 1996's "Blue".

Issue Date	Song	Artist	Ref.
April 16, 2004	"When the Sun Goes Down"	Kenny Chesney featuring Uncle Kracker	
April 23, 2004	"When the Sun Goes Down"	Kenny Chesney featuring Uncle Kracker	
April 30, 2004	"When the Sun Goes Down"	Kenny Chesney featuring Uncle Kracker	
May 7, 2004	"When the Sun Goes Down"	Kenny Chesney featuring Uncle Kracker	
May 14, 2004	"Redneck Woman"	Gretchen Wilson	
May 21, 2004	"Redneck Woman"	Gretchen Wilson	
May 28, 2004	"Redneck Woman"	Gretchen Wilson	
June 4, 2004	"Redneck Woman"	Gretchen Wilson	
June 11, 2004	"Redneck Woman"	Gretchen Wilson	
June 18, 2004	"Redneck Woman"	Gretchen Wilson	
June 25, 2004	"Redneck Woman"	Gretchen Wilson	
July 2, 2004	"I Go Back"	Kenny Chesney	
July 9, 2004	"Live Like You Were Dying"	Tim McGraw	
July 16, 2004	"I Go Back"	Kenny Chesney	
July 23, 2004	"Live Like You Were Dying"	Tim McGraw	
July 30, 2004	"Live Like You Were Dying"	Tim McGraw	
August 6, 2004	"I Go Back"	Kenny Chesney	
August 13, 2004	"I Go Back"	Kenny Chesney	
August 20, 2004	"Live Like You Were Dying"	Tim McGraw	
August 27, 2004	"Live Like You Were Dying"	Tim McGraw	
September 3, 2004	"Live Like You Were Dying"	Tim McGraw	
September 10, 2004	"Live Like You Were Dying"	Tim McGraw	
September 17, 2004	"Days Go By"	Keith Urban	
September 24, 2004	"Days Go By"	Keith Urban	
October 1, 2004	"Days Go By"	Keith Urban	
October 8, 2004	"Days Go By"	Keith Urban	
October 15, 2004	"Days Go By"	Keith Urban	
October 22, 2004	"Mr. Mom"	Lonestar	
October 29, 2004	"Mr. Mom"	Lonestar	
November 5, 2004	"Mr. Mom"	Lonestar	
November 12, 2004	"Mr. Mom"	Lonestar	
November 19, 2004	"Mr. Mom"	Lonestar	
November 26, 2004	"Mr. Mom"	Lonestar	
December 3, 2004	"Mr. Mom"	Lonestar	
December 10, 2004	"Back When"	Tim McGraw	
December 17, 2004	"Nothin' 'bout Love Makes Sense"	LeAnn Rimes	

== Year-end chart ==
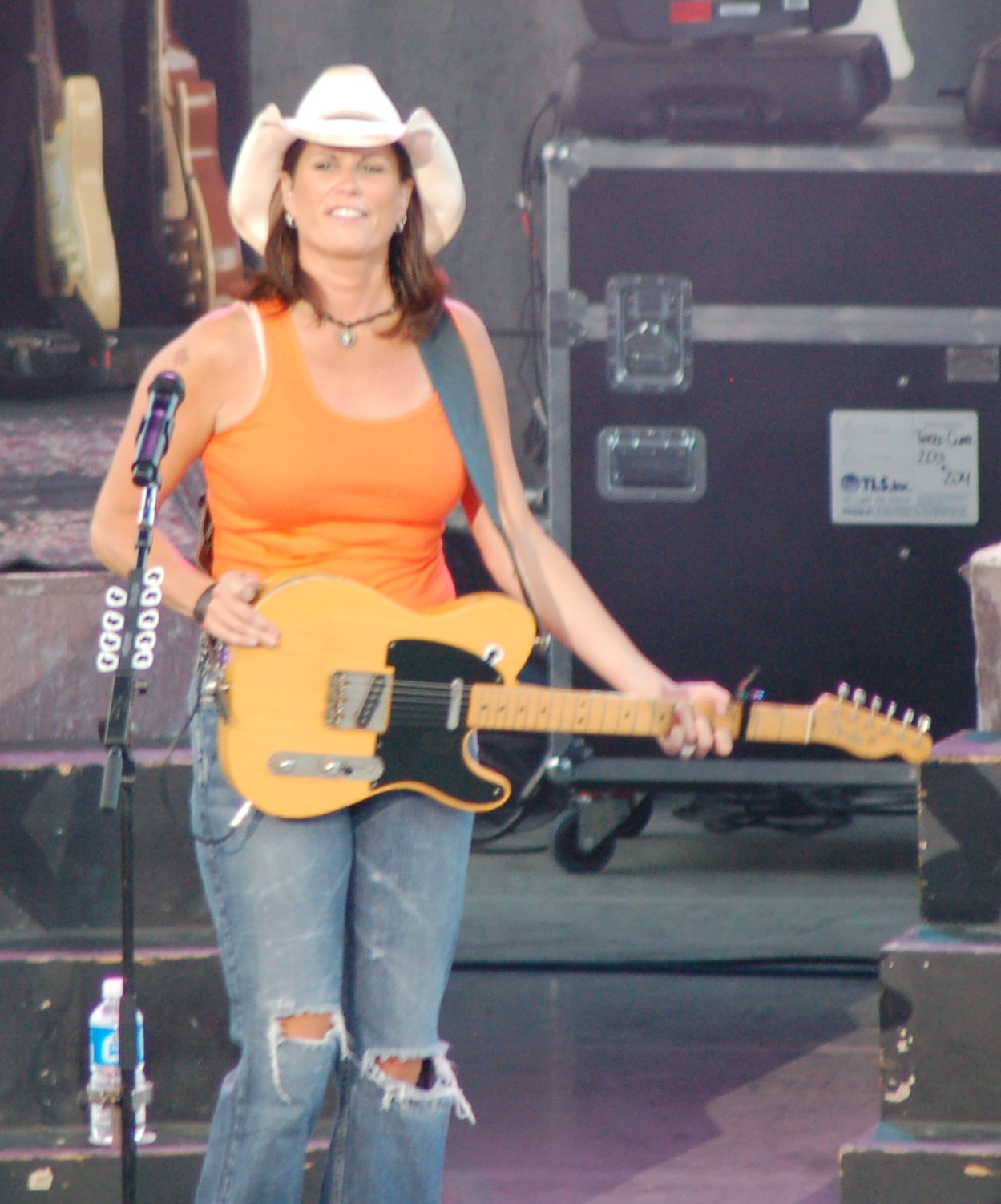
Terri Clark had the number one year-end song with "Girls Lie Too", despite that song only peaking at number two on the weekly charts.

List of songs on Radio & Records's 2004 Canada Country Year-End Chart
No.	Title	Artist(s)
1	"Girls Lie Too"	Terri Clark
2	"Live Like You Were Dying"	Tim McGraw
3	"Suds in the Bucket"	Sara Evans
4	"Days Go By"	Keith Urban
5	"Redneck Woman"	Gretchen Wilson
6	"I Go Back"	Kenny Chesney
7	"Die of a Broken Heart"	Carolyn Dawn Johnson †
8	"My Way"	Aaron Pritchett
9	"That's What It's All About"	Brooks & Dunn
10	"Here for the Party"	Gretchen Wilson
11	"If You Ever Stop Loving Me"	Montgomery Gentry
12	"Whiskey Lullaby"	Brad Paisley featuring Alison Krauss
13	"Mr. Mom"	Lonestar
14	"Let's Be Us Again"	Lonestar
15	"Too Much of a Good Thing"	Alan Jackson
16	"Never Be Another"	Adam Gregory †
17	"I Hate Everything"	George Strait
18	"I Feel a Sin Comin' On"	Jason McCoy
19	"That's What She Gets for Loving Me"	Brooks & Dunn
20	"Leavin'"	Paul Brandt †
21	"Nothing On but the Radio"	Gary Allan
22	"North Dakota Boy"	Doc Walker †
23	"I Got a Feelin'"	Billy Currington
24	"Stays in Mexico"	Toby Keith
25	"Turn It Up (I Like the Sound of That)"	Aaron Lines
26	"In a Real Love"	Phil Vassar
27	"Loco"	David Lee Murphy
28	"Mayberry"	Rascal Flatts
29	"Whiskey Girl"	Toby Keith
30	"Heroes"	Gord Bamford †

† indicates Canadian content (Cancon)

== See also ==
- 2004 in music
- List of number-one country singles of 2004 (U.S.)
