= List of Hot Country Singles & Tracks number ones of 2004 =

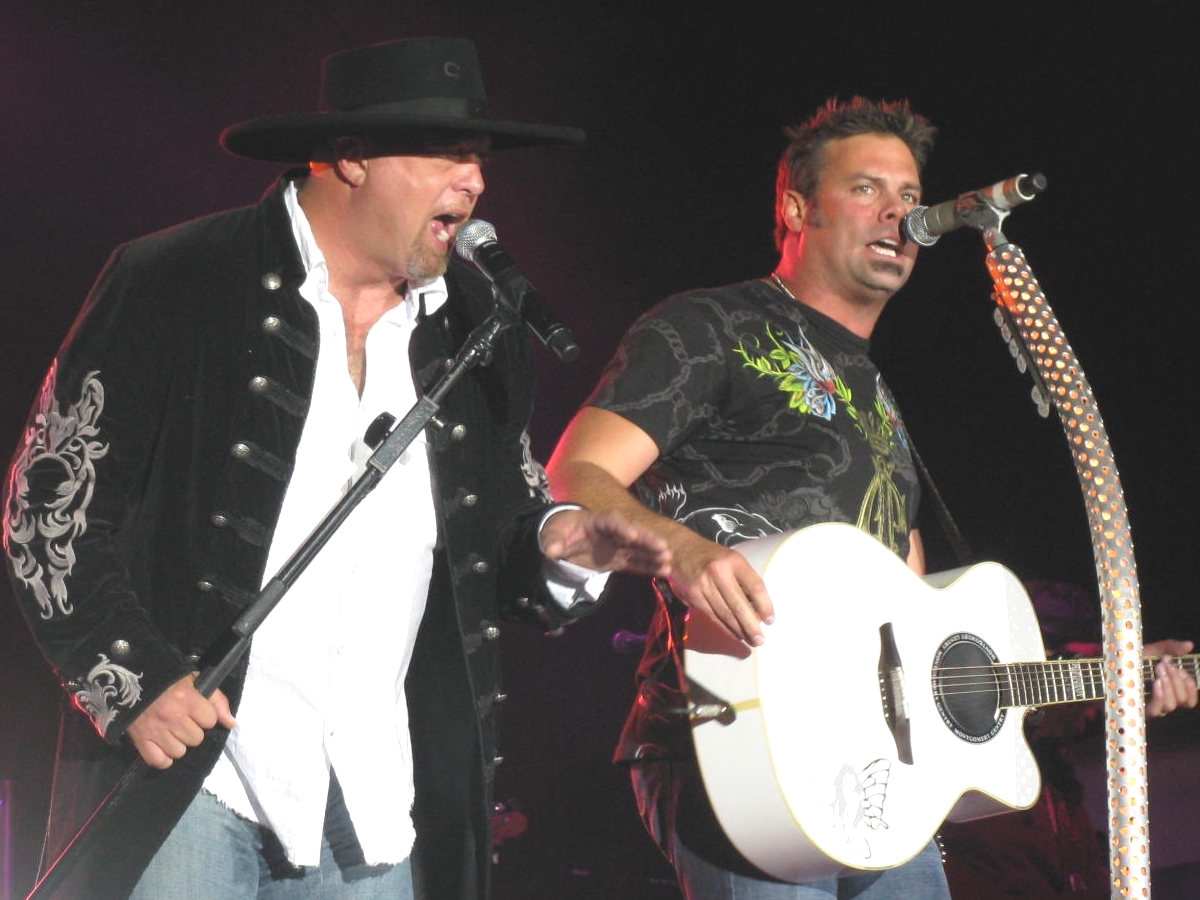
The duo Montgomery Gentry topped the chart for the first time in 2004.

Hot Country Songs is a chart that ranks the top-performing country music songs in the United States, published by Billboard magazine. In 2004, 21 different songs topped the chart, then published under the title Hot Country Singles & Tracks, in 52 issues of the magazine, based on weekly airplay data from country music radio stations compiled by Nielsen SoundScan.

Singer Kenny Chesney's song "There Goes My Life" was at number one at the start of the year, having been at the top since the issue of Billboard dated December 20, 2003. It remained at number one for the first five weeks of 2004 before being replaced by "Remember When" by Alan Jackson. The highest total number of weeks spent at number one by a song in 2004 was seven, achieved by "Live Like You Were Dying" by Tim McGraw, which was ranked number one on Billboard's year-end chart of the most popular country songs. As the song's seven weeks at the top were split into two separate spells, however, the longest unbroken run at the top was five weeks, achieved by three different songs, two of which were by Chesney: "There Goes My Life" and "When the Sun Goes Down", the latter a collaboration with Uncle Kracker. The third song with a five-week run at the top was "Redneck Woman" by Gretchen Wilson.

Tim McGraw achieved the most number one hits of the year, with three, and tied with Kenny Chesney for the most weeks in the top spot, with ten. Chesney and Toby Keith were the only artists other than McGraw to place more than one song at number one in 2004, with two each. When his collaboration with Chesney reached the top spot, Uncle Kracker gained a number one with his first single to appear on the country chart. While Kracker had previously released other recordings and even appeared on other Billboard charts, Gretchen Wilson achieved the feat of topping the chart with her first single when "Redneck Woman" reached the top spot in May. It marked the first chart-topper by a solo female artist for more than two years, but was followed to the top later in the year by songs by Reba McEntire, Terri Clark and Sara Evans. The only other act to achieve a first number one in 2004 was the duo Montgomery Gentry. The final number one of the year was "Some Beach" by Blake Shelton.

== Chart history ==
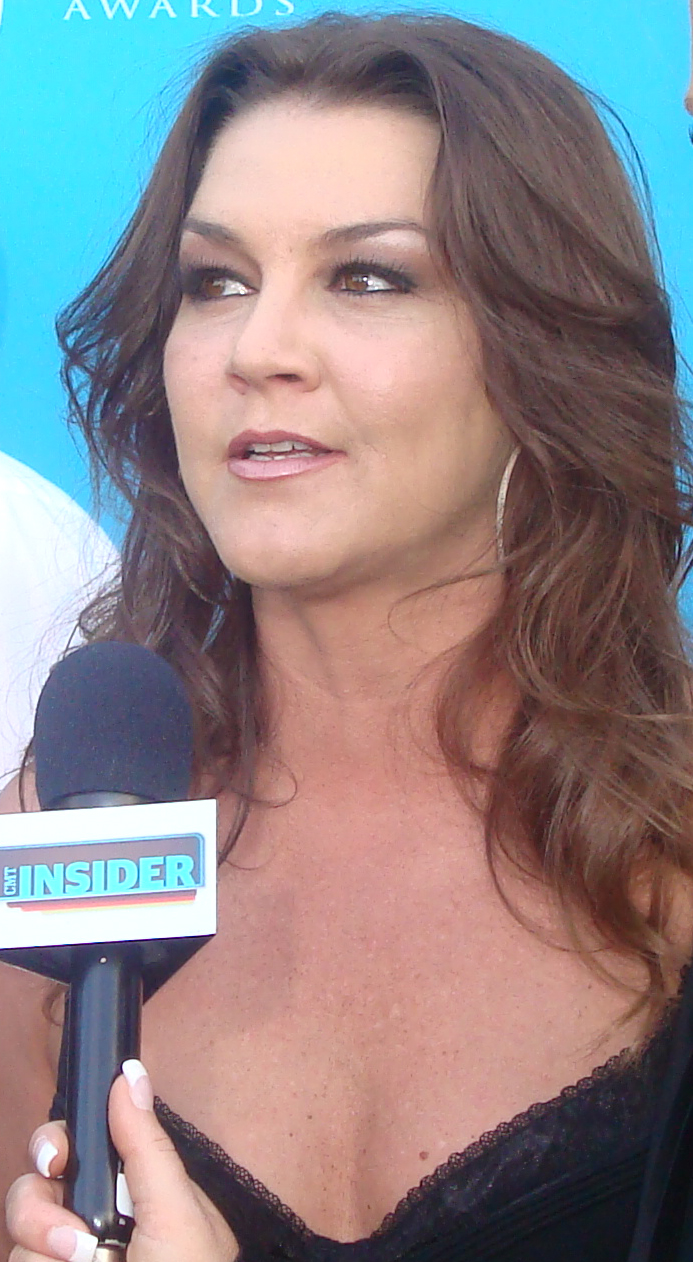
Gretchen Wilson was the first solo female artist to top the chart since April 2002.

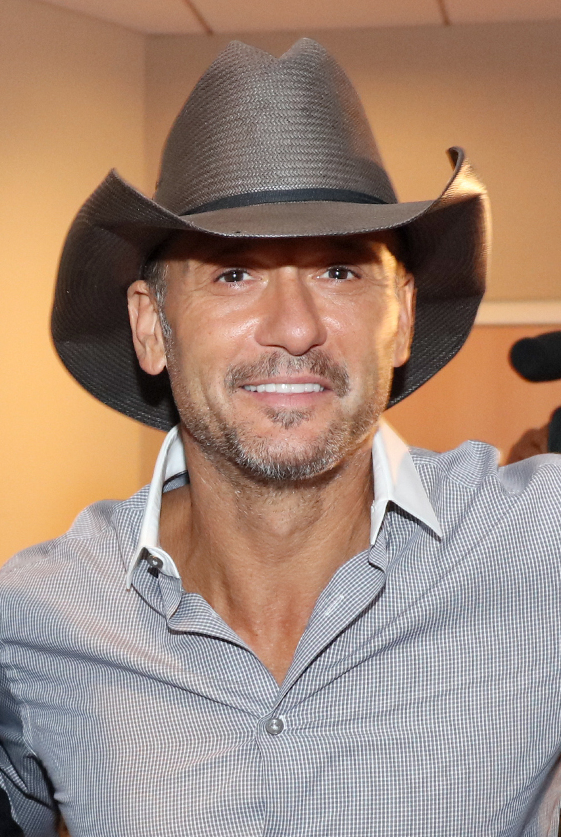
Tim McGraw spent ten weeks at number one during the year.

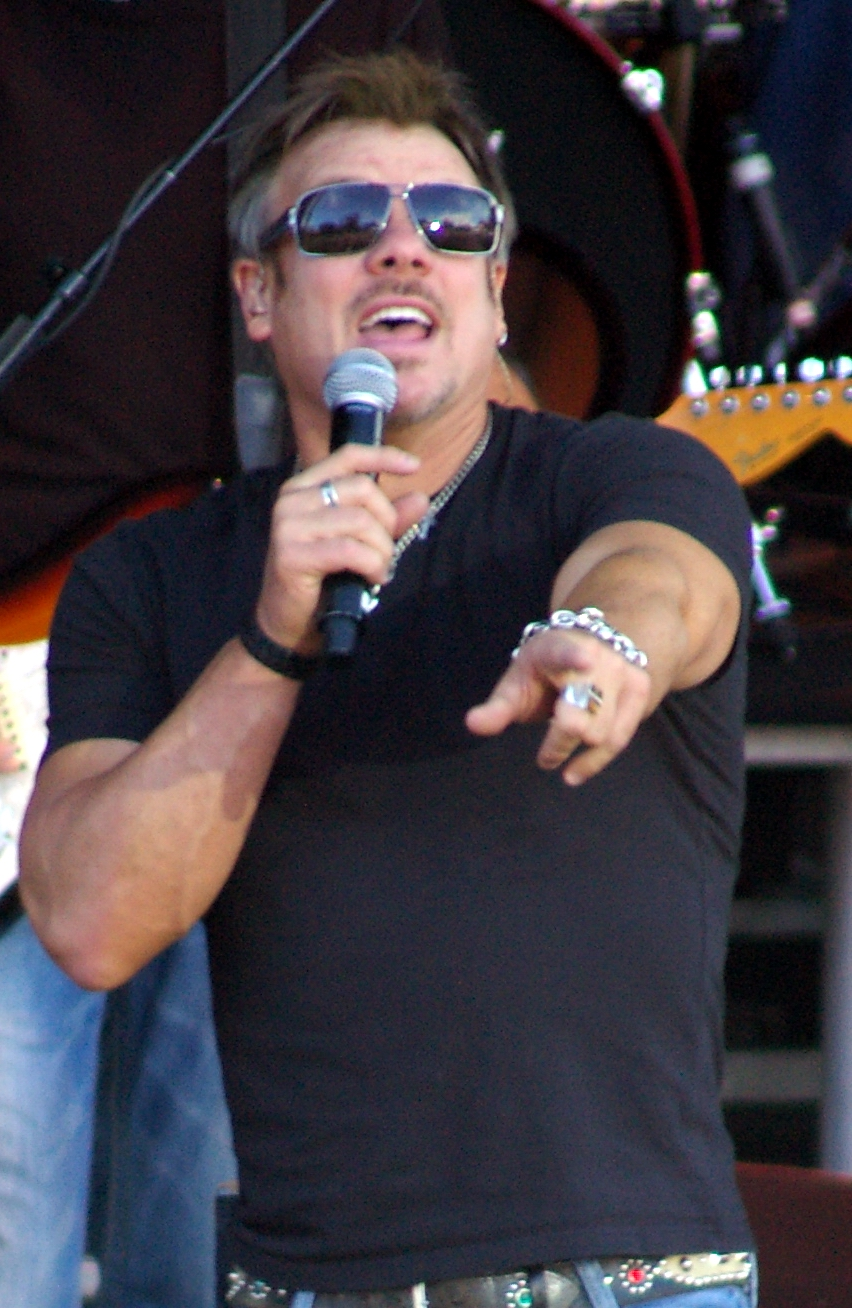
Phil Vassar spent two weeks at the top of the chart in November.

Issue date	Title	Artist(s)	Ref.
January 3	"There Goes My Life"	Kenny Chesney	
January 10	"There Goes My Life"	Kenny Chesney	
January 17	"There Goes My Life"	Kenny Chesney	
January 24	"There Goes My Life"	Kenny Chesney	
January 31	"There Goes My Life"	Kenny Chesney	
February 7	"Remember When"	Alan Jackson	
February 14	"Remember When"	Alan Jackson	
February 21	"American Soldier"	Toby Keith	
February 28	"American Soldier"	Toby Keith	
March 6	"American Soldier"	Toby Keith	
March 13	"American Soldier"	Toby Keith	
March 20	"Watch the Wind Blow By"	Tim McGraw	
March 27	"Watch the Wind Blow By"	Tim McGraw	
April 3	"When the Sun Goes Down"	Kenny Chesney & Uncle Kracker	
April 10	"When the Sun Goes Down"	Kenny Chesney & Uncle Kracker	
April 17	"When the Sun Goes Down"	Kenny Chesney & Uncle Kracker	
April 24	"When the Sun Goes Down"	Kenny Chesney & Uncle Kracker	
May 1	"When the Sun Goes Down"	Kenny Chesney & Uncle Kracker	
May 8	"You'll Think of Me"	Keith Urban	
May 15	"You'll Think of Me"	Keith Urban	
May 22	"Mayberry"	Rascal Flatts	
May 29	"Redneck Woman"	Gretchen Wilson	
June 5	"Redneck Woman"	Gretchen Wilson	
June 12	"Redneck Woman"	Gretchen Wilson	
June 19	"Redneck Woman"	Gretchen Wilson	
June 26	"Redneck Woman"	Gretchen Wilson	
July 3	"If You Ever Stop Loving Me"	Montgomery Gentry	
July 10	"Whiskey Girl"	Toby Keith	
July 17	"Live Like You Were Dying"	Tim McGraw	
July 24	"Live Like You Were Dying"	Tim McGraw	
July 31	"Live Like You Were Dying"	Tim McGraw	
August 7	"Somebody"	Reba McEntire	
August 14	"Live Like You Were Dying"	Tim McGraw	
August 21	"Live Like You Were Dying"	Tim McGraw	
August 28	"Live Like You Were Dying"	Tim McGraw	
September 4	"Live Like You Were Dying"	Tim McGraw	
September 11	"Girls Lie Too"	Terri Clark	
September 18	"Days Go By"	Keith Urban	
September 25	"Days Go By"	Keith Urban	
October 2	"Days Go By"	Keith Urban	
October 9	"Days Go By"	Keith Urban	
October 16	"Suds in the Bucket"	Sara Evans	
October 23	"I Hate Everything"	George Strait	
October 30	"I Hate Everything"	George Strait	
November 6	"In a Real Love"	Phil Vassar	
November 13	"In a Real Love"	Phil Vassar	
November 20	"Mr. Mom"	Lonestar	
November 27	"Mr. Mom"	Lonestar	
December 4	"Nothing On but the Radio"	Gary Allan	
December 11	"Nothing On but the Radio"	Gary Allan	
December 18	"Back When"	Tim McGraw	
December 25	"Some Beach"	Blake Shelton	

== See also ==
- 2004 in music
- List of artists who reached number one on the U.S. country chart
