= Fancy Free =

Fancy Free may refer to:

== Music ==
- Fancy Free (Donald Byrd album) (1969)
- Fancy Free (Richard Davis album) (1977)
- Fancy Free (The Oak Ridge Boys album) (1981)

== Other uses ==
- Fancy Free (ballet), a ballet with choreography by Jerome Robbins and composed by Leonard Bernstein
- Fancy Free (Australian TV program), a 1961 music variety television show
- Fancy Free (Canadian TV program), a 1960 music variety television show
- Fancy Free, a 1918 Broadway show by Augustus Barratt
