= Unamerican =

Unamerican or Un-American may refer to:

- Designation used by the House Un-American Activities Committee
- UnAmerican (band), English rock band based out of London
- The Un-Americans, heel professional wrestling stable from 2002 to 2003
- "Unamerican", a 2018 song by Dead Sara from Temporary Things Taking Up Space
- Turned A, a logical symbol for 'un-American'

== See also ==
- Anti-Americanism
