= Swing Gently =

- Genre: Variety show
- Country of origin: Canada
- Original language: English
- No. of seasons: 1

Production
- Running time: 60 minutes

Original release
- Network: CBC Television
- Release: 18 July – 19 September 1960

Related
- Swing Easy; Fancy Free

Swing Gently is a Canadian musical variety show that aired on CBC Television in 1960.

== Premise ==
Episodes featured the Billy Van Four with other regulars Allan Blye, Pam Hyatt Alan Millar and Ruth Walker. Visiting artists included musicians and dancers such as David Adams, Joey Hollingsworth, Nina Simone, Lois Smith and the Rhythm Pals.

== Scheduling ==
This hour-long program was broadcast on Mondays at 9:30 p.m. from 18 July to 19 September 1960. In October 1960, Swing Gently became the regular season series Fancy Free.
