= Jason White (musician, born 1967) =

American singer-songwriter and multi-instrumentalist

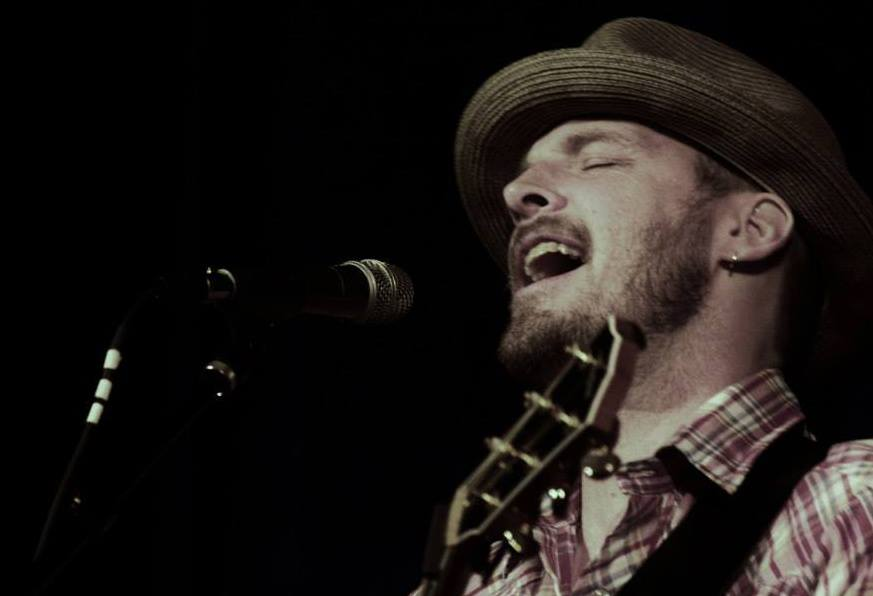

Background information
- Born: Jason Sandbrink White; May 9, 1967 (age 58); Cleveland, Ohio, U.S.
- Genres: Rock, folk rock
- Occupations: Singer-songwriter
- Instruments: Vocals, guitar, piano, bass, harmonica, ukulele
- Years active: 1985–present
- Formerly of: The Janglers, Jason White and The Dying Breed

Jason Sandbrink White (born May 9, 1967) is an American singer-songwriter and multi-instrumentalist.

Born and raised in Cleveland, Ohio, he now resides in Nashville. He began his career as the lead vocalist and songwriter for The Janglers, a Cleveland-based rock band, then as the frontman for Jason White and the Dying Breed. He later moved to Nashville where he continues his career as a solo artist and songwriter. White has released four solo albums, Shades of Gray (2000), Tonight's Top Story (2004), The Longing (2011), and Journal (2013). He tours throughout the U.S. and is a regular performer at songwriters’ festivals. He is also known for writing "Red Rag Top", a controversial hit song for country artist Tim McGraw, as well as compositions for other artists including Carrie Underwood, Old Crow Medicine Show, and Liam Titcomb.

== Early life ==
Jason White was the second child of Keith Ernsberger White (1930–2012, architect) and Leatrice Alonzo White (1923–2013, interior designer). White began playing guitar at the age of seven and wrote his first song at 12. He fronted several local garage bands in his Cleveland Heights, Ohio neighborhood during his elementary school years. At University School in the seventh grade, he met John Treadway (born June 19, 1967) who also played guitar. The two formed a partnership and began performing as Treadway and White in school talent shows, local cafes, and house parties. After attending college for one year, White dropped out of Middlebury College and Treadway left Yale University so the two could pursue their musical interests.

== The Janglers/Jason White and the Dying Breed ==
After their first year in college, Jason White and John Treadway moved to Austin, Texas with another high school friend, John "Sonny" Miller, who played bass guitar. The three worked restaurant jobs and played at local bars while honing their musical chops and writing songs. They returned to Cleveland in November 1987, added David Blackwelder on drums and named themselves the Brainbell Janglers, after a line from The Rolling Stones' song "Midnight Rambler." They began performing at local nightclubs in the Cleveland area, and almost instantly were drawing capacity crowds at Peabody's Café, the Euclid Tavern, the Greenville Inn, and Peabody's Downunder among others. They shortened the group's name to The Janglers, and in 1988 released the first of their two albums, Sweet Providence. The album received positive reviews from local and national critics, who repeatedly compared The Janglers’ sound to that of The Band. After replacing Blackwelder with drummer Will Douglas and adding keyboardist Henry Bruner, the Janglers began touring Midwestern college towns, playing at bars and fraternity parties and developing strong fan bases in towns throughout Ohio, Pennsylvania, Illinois, Indiana, and New York.

More personnel changes occurred during the next five years. Eric Meany replaced Bruner on keyboards in 1989. John Treadway, White's best friend and longtime partner, left the band in early 1990 and was replaced by guitarist Jack Silverman. Treadway had struggled with depression for several years and committed suicide on April 21, 1990. Meany's New Orleans-style piano playing and Silverman's deft guitar improvisation took the Janglers’ sound in a more jam-oriented direction, and the band's second album Circuit Ride (1991) was often compared by critics to the music of Little Feat and The Allman Brothers Band. White wrote all the songs on the album, and was recognized by journalists as a songwriter fluent in varied musical styles. The Janglers continued to tour constantly and opened shows for Phish, Widespread Panic, The Radiators, Toad the Wet Sprocket, Hot Tuna, and The Dickey Betts Band among others. They served as the backing band for Rock and Roll Hall of Fame inductee Bo Diddley on two separate occasions. The Janglers performed their song "Ties That Bind" on the television show Star Search on April 20, 1991.

The Janglers disbanded in 1993, after which White moved to a secluded cabin in Waite Hill, Ohio, where he lived for six months and wrote songs. The songs he composed during this period caught the attention of Clay Bradley, an artist-publisher relations executive at Broadcast Music Incorporated (BMI) in Nashville. White formed a new band, Jason White and the Dying Breed, and began making trips to Nashville where he recorded demos of his new songs at Bradley's Barn, a recording studio owned by Clay Bradley's grandfather, the producer Owen Bradley. Those demos were sent to major record labels and led to a contract with Universal Records for White as a solo artist. White teamed up with producer John Simon (The Band, Blood, Sweat & Tears, Simon and Garfunkel) and recorded an album entitled Confessions on the Overpass (1997). A shakeup in the corporate structure of Universal resulted in the firing of White's A&R representatives and the album was never released. White relocated to Nashville in 1998.

== Solo career ==
After severing ties with Universal Records, White recorded a new album at Bradley's Barn, this time working with producer and bassist Viktor Krauss. White extended his range as an instrumentalist for the project, adding piano, organ and xylophone tracks along with his usual guitar work. The resulting album, Shades of Gray (2000), received high praise from critics and the songs "Average Joe" and "At The Alibi" were placed in rotation on several AAA radio stations, notably Nashville's WRLT Lightning 100 FM. Bradley, meanwhile, had taken an A&R position at Acuff-Rose Music Publishing, and he signed White to a publishing deal. White toured in support of Shades, including regular performances at: Nashville's Exit/In, the Bluebird Café, and 12th and Porter; New York City's the Lion's Den; and the Beachland Ballroom in Cleveland.

In 2002, an independent song plugger heard White's song "Red Rag Top" on Lightning 100. She purchased a copy of White's album and gave it to country artist Tim McGraw, who recorded "Red Ragtop" for his 2002 release Tim McGraw and the Dancehall Doctors. The song's lyrics, which touched on the topic of abortion, proved too risqué for some radio programmers, and the song was pulled from the playlists of some major country radio stations. The ensuing controversy made headlines in USA Today, The Tennessean, the Cleveland Plain Dealer and other newspapers. White was interviewed by Paula Zahn on CNN where he defended the song as a simple true-to-life love story. Despite the negative reaction of some radio programmers and listeners, the song rose to No. 5 on the Billboard country singles chart.[c] In 2013, the song appeared in the Paramount Pictures movie "The Guilt Trip." White followed up in 2004 with Tonight's Top Story, which was also well received by the music press and garnered AAA radio airplay. The album was produced by Viktor Krauss and re-established White as a mordant storyteller and a capable tunesmith.

After a seven-year hiatus during which White was married and divorced, he released The Longing in 2011. Produced by White and Roger Moutenot (Yo La Tengo, Josh Rouse, Jessie Baylin), the album presents a softer, early-1970s pop style and an emphasis on love songs, rather than White's typically more challenging subject matter. White's label, Better Angels Music, simultaneously released a video for the song "Perfect Stranger," which was filmed in Paris by director Don Julien. In 2013, White released Journal, a two-disc compilation of some of his best known songs. The album includes the song "Little Pieces of Plastic," which was chosen by the Occupy Movement to appear on its 2012 release Occupy This Album. White continues to be a regular performer in the multi-media show Freedom Sings, written and directed by Ken Paulson, president of the Freedom Forum and former editor-in-chief of USA Today. The show is a critically acclaimed musical tribute to the First Amendment and has toured throughout the U.S. White has been a participant since 2003.

== Awards ==
For "Red Ragtop," White received a BMI Award, a BMI Million-Air Award, and Music Row's Song of the Year Award for 2003.

== Discography ==
=== Albums ===
==== The Janglers ====
- Sweet Providence (1988), SPI Records
- Circuit Ride (1991), Maya Records

==== Jason White ====
- Shades of Gray (2001), Hanging Vines Music
- Tonight's Top Story (2004), Hanging Vines Music
- The Longing (2011), Better Angels Records
- Journal (2013), Hanging Vines Music

=== Songwriting ===
Year	Album	Song(s)	Performing Artist	Credits
2015	Storyteller	"Choctaw County Affair"	Carrie Underwood	Writer
2015	I Made It	"Walking By Beauty"	Diamond Rio	Co-writer
2015	(Single)	"American Woman"	Muddy Magnolias	Co-writer
2012	Carry Me Back	"Ain't It Enough"	Old Crow Medicine Show	Co-writer
2012	Cicada	"Angeline," "Jaded"	Liam Titcomb	Co-writer
2012	Occupy This Album	"Little Pieces of Plastic"	Jason White	Writer/Performer
2011	Tennessee: The Nashville Sessions	"For The Freeway Home"	Russell Hitchcock	Writer
2009	Mayfair	"Topsy Turvy Love"	Swan Dive	Co-writer
2002	Tim McGraw and the Dancehall Doctors	"Red Ragtop"	Tim McGraw	Writer
