= Tim McGraw and the Dancehall Doctors =

Studio album by Tim McGraw
- Released: November 26, 2002
- Studios: Allaire Studios (Shokan, New York); Emerald Entertainment, Sound Stage Studios and Profound Sound Recording Studios (Nashville, Tennessee); Essential Sound (Houston, Texas); O'Henry Sound Studios (Burbank, California); Henson Recording Studios (Hollywood, California)
- Genre: Country
- Length: 66:10
- Label: Curb
- Producers: Byron Gallimore; Tim McGraw; Darran Smith

Tim McGraw chronology
Set This Circus Down (2001)	Tim McGraw and the Dancehall Doctors (2002)	Live Like You Were Dying (2004)

Singles from Tim McGraw and the Dancehall Doctors
- 1. "Red Rag Top" Released: September 16, 2002; 2. "Tiny Dancer" Released: December 30, 2002; 3. "She's My Kind of Rain" Released: January 20, 2003; 4. "Real Good Man" Released: May 19, 2003; 5. "Watch the Wind Blow By" Released: October 27, 2003

Professional ratings
Aggregate scores
Source	Rating
Metacritic	(68/100)
Review scores
Source	Rating
411Mania	(8/10)
About.com	5/5 stars
AllMusic	3.5/5 stars
Billboard	(favorable)
Blender	4/5 stars
Country Weekly	(favorable)
Entertainment Weekly	B
People	(mixed)
Robert Christgau	C+
Rolling Stone	2/5 stars

Tim McGraw and the Dancehall Doctors is the seventh studio album by American country music artist Tim McGraw and the first to feature his band The Dancehall Doctors. It was released in November 26, 2002 by Curb Records and was recorded on a mountaintop studio in upstate New York. Four singles were released. Two songs were in the movie Black Cloud, starring McGraw. The album also included a cover of Elton John's "Tiny Dancer", which was released only to the AC format, although it also reached the country charts from unsolicited airplay. The album debuted at number 2 on the Billboard 200 with first week sales of 602,000 copies.

== Track listing ==
No.	Title	Writer(s)	Length
1.	"Comfort Me"	Don Poythress; Craig Wiseman	5:23
2.	"Tickin' Away"	Lore Orion	4:19
3.	"Home"	Wiseman; Tony Mullins	4:58
4.	"Red Rag Top"	Jason White	4:43
5.	"That's Why God Made Mexico"	James T. Slater	3:35
6.	"Watch the Wind Blow By"	Anders Osborne; Dylan Altman	4:36
7.	"Illegal"	Orion	3:54
8.	"Sleep Tonight"	Angelo Petraglia; Hillary Lindsey; Troy Verges	4:02
9.	"I Know How to Love You Well"	Arne "Honda" Hovda; Kristian Ottestad	5:10
10.	"Sing Me Home"	Gordon Kennedy; Wayne Kirkpatrick	4:40^{A}
11.	"She's My Kind of Rain"	Tommy Lee James; Robin Lerner	4:15
12.	"Who Are They"	Danny Tate; Brad Warren	3:44
13.	"Real Good Man"	George Teren; Rivers Rutherford	4:15
14.	"All We Ever Find"	Liz Rose; Kim Patton-Johnston	3:20^{A}
15.	"Tiny Dancer"	Elton John; Bernie Taupin	5:09

^{A}Song also featured in the movie Black Cloud

== Personnel ==
Tim McGraw & the Dancehall Doctors

- Tim McGraw – lead vocals
- Jeff McMahon – keyboards
- Denny Hemingson – electric guitar, baritone guitar, slide guitar, steel guitar, Melobar guitar
- Bob Minner – acoustic guitar, dobro
- Darran Smith – electric guitar
- Deano Brown – fiddle, mandolin
- John Marcus – bass
- Billy Mason – drums
- David Dunkley – percussion

Additional Musicians

- Steve Nathan – synth horns (5), organ (5), Wurlitzer electric piano (11)
- John Prestia – electric guitar (10), harmonica (12)
- B. James Lowry – acoustic guitar (12)
- Byron Gallimore – electric guitar (14)
- Kirk "Jelly Roll" Johnson – harmonica (12)
- Frank Macek – loops (1, 4, 8, 11)
- David Campbell – string arrangements (8, 15)
- Paul Buckmaster – string arrangements (11)

Background vocals

- Greg Barnhill (1, 15)
- Kim Carnes (1, 15)
- Gene Miller (2-6, 8-15)
- Chris Rodriguez (2-6, 8-14)
- Don Henley (7)
- Timothy B. Schmit (7)

== Production ==
- Byron Gallimore – producer
- Tim McGraw – producer, creative director, photography
- Darran Smith – producer
- Julian King – tracking engineer
- Ricky Cobble – second tracking engineer, additional engineer
- Steve Churchyard – string engineer (8, 11, 15)
- Dennis Davis – additional engineer
- Jason Gantt – additional engineer
- Tony Green – additional engineer
- Hank Linderman – additional engineer
- Erik Lutkins – additional engineer, assistant engineer, Pro Tools engineer
- David Bryant – assistant engineer
- Matthew Cullen – assistant engineer
- Brandon Mason – assistant engineer
- Chris Bittner – Pro Tools engineer
- Cory Churko – Pro Tools mixing
- Mike Shipley – mixing at Record One (Sherman Oaks, California)
- Jeff Burns – mix assistant
- Robert Hadley – mastering
- Doug Sax – mastering
- The Mastering Lab (Hollywood, California) – mastering location
- Harry McCarthy – technical assistant
- John Prestia – technical assistant
- Joey Supak – technical assistant
- Kelly Clauge Wright – creative director, photography
- Glenn Sweitzer – art direction, design
- John Marcus – illustration
- Scott Siman – illustration
- Dean Brown – photography
- Marina Chavez – photography
- John Ward – photography
- RPM Management – management

== Charts and certifications ==
=== Weekly charts ===
Weekly chart performance for Tim McGraw and the Dancehall Doctors
Chart (2002–2004)	Peak position
Australian Albums (ARIA)	74
US Billboard 200	2
US Top Country Albums (Billboard)	2

=== Year-end charts ===
Year-end chart performance for Tim McGraw and the Dancehall Doctors
Chart (2002)	Position
Canadian Albums (Nielsen SoundScan)	148
Canadian Country Albums (Nielsen SoundScan)	9
Worldwide Albums (IFPI)	36

Chart (2003)	Position
US Billboard 200	9
US Top Country Albums (Billboard)	3

Chart (2004)	Position
US Billboard 200	164
US Top Country Albums (Billboard)	24

=== Certifications ===
Region	Certification	Certified units/sales
Canada (Music Canada)	Platinum	100,000^{^}
United States (RIAA)	3× Platinum	3,000,000^{^}
^{^} Shipments figures based on certification alone.
