= Swing Easy (TV program) =

- Genre: Variety show
- Written by: Alex Barris
- Presented by: Alan Millar
- Country of origin: Canada
- Original language: English
- No. of seasons: 1

Production
- Producers: Bob Jarvis; Syd Wayne (some episodes)
- Production location: Toronto
- Running time: 30 minutes

Original release
- Network: CBC Television
- Release: 4 July – 26 September 1959

Related
- Swing Gently

Swing Easy is a Canadian music and variety show that aired on CBC Television in 1959.

== Premise ==
Regular performers included host Ruth Walker, music group the Rhythm Pals and an orchestra led by Bill Richards.

For example, one episode from 29 August 1959, featured a Shakespeare theme with singer Denyse Angers and musician Peter Appleyard.

== Scheduling ==
This half-hour program was broadcast Saturdays at 7:30 p.m. from 4 July to 26 September 1959.
