= Live Like You Were Dying =

Studio album by Tim McGraw
- Released: August 24, 2004
- Studios: Allaire Studios (Shokan, New York); Blackbird Studio (Nashville, Tennessee); Record One (Los Angeles, California)
- Genre: Country
- Length: 64:41
- Label: Curb
- Producers: Byron Gallimore; Tim McGraw; Darran Smith

Tim McGraw chronology
Tim McGraw and the Dancehall Doctors (2002)	Live Like You Were Dying (2004)	Reflected: Greatest Hits Vol. 2 (2006)

Singles from Live Like You Were Dying
- 1. "Live Like You Were Dying" Released: June 7, 2004; 2. "Back When" Released: August 30, 2004; 3. "Drugs or Jesus" Released: January 17, 2005; 4. "Do You Want Fries with That" Released: May 23, 2005; 5. "My Old Friend" Released: September 20, 2005

Professional ratings
Aggregate scores
Source	Rating
Metacritic	(61/100)
Review scores
Source	Rating
About.com	5/5 stars
Allmusic	4.5/5 stars
Billboard	Positive
Cross Rhythms	10/10 stars
Entertainment Weekly	B
Los Angeles Times	2/4 stars
Mojo	1/5 stars
The New York Times	Mixed
USA Today	3.5/4 stars

Live Like You Were Dying is the eighth studio album by American country music artist Tim McGraw. It was released on August 24, 2004, by Curb Records. It was recorded in a mountaintop studio in upstate New York. It entered the Billboard 200 chart at number one, with sales of 766,000 copies in its first week. The album was certified 4× Platinum by the RIAA for shipping four million copies, and was nominated for Best Country Album at the 47th Annual Grammy Awards. That same year at the Grammys, the title track from Live Like You Were Dying was nominated for Song of the Year and won in the categories Best Country Song and Best Male Country Vocal Performance. Five singles were released from the album, all were top 15 hits on the Hot Country Songs chart, two of which hit #1.

== Content ==
The title track was the first single from the album. The song peaked at number 1 on the Billboard Hot Country Songs chart, held it for seven weeks, and peaked at number 29 on the Billboard Hot 100. The song won a Grammy Award for Best Male Country Vocal Performance. The music video for the title track prominently featured McGraw's father, former baseball player Tug McGraw, who had died of brain cancer. This song was also the number one country song of 2004 according to Billboard Year-End.

The next single from this album is "Back When", which also reached #1 on Billboard Hot Country Songs chart. The third single, "Drugs or Jesus" peaked at #14, making it the first McGraw single since 1993 not to reach the country Top 10 (not counting "Tiny Dancer"). "Do You Want Fries with That" was the fourth single and peaked at #5, and the fifth and final single, "My Old Friend", peaked at #6.

"How Bad Do You Want It" was featured as the theme song to CMT's Trick My Truck. "Can't Tell Me Nothin'" was previously recorded by Travis Tritt on his 2002 album Strong Enough.

== Track listing ==
No.	Title	Writer(s)	Length
1.	"How Bad Do You Want It"	Jim Collins; Bill Luther	3:44
2.	"My Old Friend"	Craig Wiseman; Steve McEwan	3:37
3.	"Can't Tell Me Nothin'"	Steve Bogard; Rick Giles	3:08
4.	"Old Town New"	Bruce Robison; Darrell Scott	5:00
5.	"Live Like You Were Dying"	Wiseman; Tim Nichols	4:58
6.	"Drugs or Jesus"	Brett James; Chris Lindsey; Aimee Mayo; Troy Verges	4:39
7.	"Back When"	Jeff Stevens; Stan Lynch; Stephony Smith	4:59
8.	"Something's Broken"	Casey Beathard; Kevin Horne	3:42
9.	"Open Season on My Heart"	Rodney Crowell; James T. Slater	3:39
10.	"Everybody Hates Me"	Beathard; Ed Hill	3:28
11.	"Walk Like a Man"	Tom Douglas	3:35
12.	"Blank Sheet of Paper"	Don Schlitz; Brad Warren, Brett Warren	4:07
13.	"Just Be Your Tear"	Wiseman; Tony Mullins	4:47
14.	"Do You Want Fries with That"	Beathard; Kerry Kurt Phillips	3:59
15.	"Kill Myself"	Bob DiPiero; Anthony Smith; Bobby Terry	3:07
16.	"We Carry On"	Slater; Douglas	4:12

== Personnel ==
Tim McGraw & The Dance Hall Doctors

- Tim McGraw – lead vocals
- Jeff McMahon – acoustic piano, Rhodes, Wurlitzer electric piano, Hammond B3 organ, synthesizers
- Denny Hemingson – electric guitar, steel guitar, baritone guitar, slide guitar, dobro, Melobar guitar
- Bob Minner – acoustic guitar, banjo, mandolin (2, 12)
- Darran Smith – electric guitar, acoustic guitar (12)
- Deano Brown – fiddle, mandolin
- John Marcus – bass
- Billy Mason – drums
- David Dunkley – percussion

Background vocals

- Russell Terrell (1, 3, 4, 8, 14)
- Steve McEwan (2)
- Greg Barnhill (4–7, 11, 16)
- Kim Carnes (4, 6)
- Bob Bailey (6)
- Kim Fleming (6)
- Vicki Hampton (6)
- Rodney Crowell (9)
- Wes Hightower (10, 15, 16)
- Faith Hill (12)
- Brett Warren (12)
- Gene Miller (13, 16)
- Chris Rodriguez (13)

Strings on tracks 5, 6, 11 & 15

- David Campbell – string arrangements
- Suzie Katayama – string contractor
- Larry Corbett and Suzie Katayama – cello
- Bob Becker and Evan Wilson – viola
- Charlie Bisharat, Darius Campo, Susan Chatman, Mario DeLeon, Berj Garabedian, Armen Garabedian, Natalie Leggett and Sara Parkins – violin

== Production ==
- Missi Gallimore – A&R direction
- Byron Gallimore – producer, mixing
- Tim McGraw – producer, mixing
- Darran Smith – producer
- Julian King – tracking engineer (1, 3–13, 15)
- David Bryant – second tracking engineer (1, 3–13, 15)
- Steve Churchyard – string engineer (5, 6, 11, 15)
- Greg Lawrence – additional engineer (5, 6, 11, 15), second string engineer (5, 6, 11, 15)
- Jesse Chrisman – assistant engineer
- Ricky Cobble – assistant engineer (1, 3–13, 15)
- Matt Cullen – assistant engineer
- Jason Gantt – assistant engineer, Pro Tools engineer
- Erik Lutkins – assistant engineer, Pro Tools engineer
- Sara Lesher – assistant engineer
- Harry McCarthy – technician assistant
- John Prestia – technician assistant
- Mike Rector – technician assistant
- Hank Williams – mastering
- Ann Callis – production assistant
- Kelly Clauge Wright – creative director
- Glenn Sweitzer – art direction, design
- Mark Seliger – cover photography
- Tony Duran – back photography

Studios

- Tracks 1, 3-13 & 15 recorded at Allaire Studios (Shokan, New York).
- Tracks 2, 4, 14 & 16 recorded at Blackbird Studio (Nashville, Tennessee).
- Strings recorded at Record One Studio B (Sherman Oaks, California).
- Mixed at Essential Sound (Houston, Texas) and Emerald Sound Studio (Nashville, Tennessee).
- Mastered at MasterMix (Nashville, Tennessee).

== Chart positions ==
Live Like You Were Dying debuted on the US Billboard 200 chart at number one, his third number-one album, and on the Top Country Albums at number one, making it his seventh number one on that chart.

=== Weekly charts ===
Chart (2004)	Peak position
Australian Albums (ARIA)	36
Canadian Albums (Billboard)	2
US Billboard 200	1
US Top Country Albums (Billboard)	1

=== Year-end charts ===
Chart (2004)	Position
US Billboard 200	28
US Top Country Albums (Billboard)	4
Worldwide Albums (IFPI)	28

Chart (2005)	Position
US Billboard 200	25
US Top Country Albums (Billboard)	5

Chart (2006)	Position
US Top Country Albums (Billboard)	48

== Sales and certifications ==
Region	Certification	Certified units/sales
Canada (Music Canada)	Platinum	100,000^{^}
United States (RIAA)	4× Platinum	4,000,000^{^}
^{^} Shipments figures based on certification alone.
