= Over and Over (Nelly song) =

2004 single by Nelly

Single by Nelly featuring Tim McGraw

from the album Suit
- Released: September 12, 2004
- Studio: The Record Plant (Los Angeles); Basement Beats (St. Louis)
- Genre: Country rap
- Length: 4:14 (main version); 3:49 (radio version)
- Label: Universal; Curb
- Composers: Jayson "KoKo" Bridges; James D. "Sted-Fast" Hargrove II
- Lyricist: Nelly
- Producers: Jayson "KoKo" Bridges; James D. "Sted-Fast" Hargrove II

Nelly singles chronology
"Tilt Ya Head Back" (2004)	"Over and Over" (2004)	"Na-NaNa-Na" (2005)

Tim McGraw singles chronology
"Back When" (2004)	"Over and Over" (2004)	"Drugs or Jesus" (2005)

Music video
- "Over and Over" on YouTube

"Over and Over" is a song by American rapper Nelly featuring American country music singer Tim McGraw. The lyrics were written by Nelly while the music was written and produced by James D. "Sted-Fast" Hargrove II and Jayson "KoKo" Bridges. Other musicians who contributed to the recording include Bryan Loss (drums) and Matthew Brauss (bass guitar). The lyrics of the song focus on regret.

"Over and Over" was released on September 12, 2004, as the second single from Nelly's fourth album, Suit (2004). Commercially, the song peaked at number three on the US Billboard Hot 100 and topped the charts of Australia, Canada, Ireland, and the United Kingdom. Music critics responded positively to the track, who gave most praise to McGraw's vocal performance. The song was later included on McGraw's 2006 compilation album Reflected: Greatest Hits Vol. 2.

== Critical reception ==
Rashaun Hall of Billboard wrote that "Over and Over" possesses "real emotion" and praised Tim McGraw's "moving" vocals. Jason Birchmeier of AllMusic also complimented McGraw's hook, saying that it "works much better than it should."

== Commercial performance ==
"Over and Over" was a success on the US Billboard Hot 100, reaching number three on December 4, 2004, and spending 24 weeks on the chart. On the Billboard Mainstream Top 40 chart, the song peaked at number one and set multiple records, including the biggest jump to number one (7–1), the quickest climb to the top spot (four weeks), and the biggest airplay increase for a number-one song (1,783 detections). It also reached number one on the Rhythmic Top 40 chart and entered the top 20 on the Adult Top 40 and Hot Rap Tracks listings. It was the 96th-most-successful song of the US in 2004 and the 48th-most-successful song of the following year, earning a platinum certification from the Recording Industry Association of America (RIAA) in 2009. The song was a radio hit in Canada, peaking at number one on the Radio & Records CHR/Pop Top 30 chart.

In Europe, "Over and Over" topped the charts of Ireland and the United Kingdom. In the latter country, it stayed on the UK Singles Chart for 15 weeks, becoming Britain's 25th biggest-selling song of 2005. It was certified gold by the British Phonographic Industry in 2024 for shipping over 400,000 copies in the United Kingdom. Across continental Europe, the single entered the top 10 in Austria, the Czech Republic, Denmark, Germany, Hungary, Romania, and Switzerland, achieving a peak of number two on the Eurochart Hot 100. It additionally topped the Australian Singles Chart, staying at the top for five weeks, earning a double-platinum certification, and finishing in fifth place on Australia's year-end chart for 2005. In New Zealand, it reached a peak of number two on February 14, 2005, and was the year's 29th-best-selling hit.

== Music video ==
The music video was directed by Erik White and Nelly himself. During the video, Nelly and McGraw sing individually on split screen. It starts with Nelly and Tim both waking up at 5:30 A.M., both taking showers, and both leaving their houses & getting into vehicles. Nelly has photos of Ciara on his nightstand and in his car, and McGraw has photos of Faith Hill. The settings feature similar scenes of them encountering fans at gas stations, traveling, and making visits to the airport, all the while both preoccupied with their respective significant others. In the end, they both depart on separate but comparable private jets, possibly to meet up with the women they have been singing about throughout the video.

== Track listings ==
UK CD single

1. "Over and Over" – 4:14
2. "Over and Over" (Moox Suit remix) – 3:26
3. "Getcha Getcha" (featuring St. Lunatics) – 4:37
4. "Over and Over" (video)

UK 12-inch single

A1. "Over and Over" – 4:14
A2. "Over and Over" (Moox Suit remix) – 3:26
B1. "Getcha Getcha" (featuring St. Lunatics) – 4:37
B2. "Over and Over" (instrumental) – 4:14

European CD single

1. "Over and Over" (album version) – 4:14
2. "Over and Over (Moox Suit remix) – 3:26

Australasian CD single

1. "Over and Over" – 4:14
2. "Over and Over" (Moox Suit remix) – 3:26
3. "Getcha Getcha" (featuring St. Lunatics) – 4:37
4. "Hot in Herre" (remix) – 3:45

== Credits and personnel ==
Credits are taken from the US promo CD liner notes.

Studios

- Recorded at The Record Plant (Los Angeles) and Basement Beats (St. Louis)
- Mixed at Platinum Sound Recording (New York City)
- Mastered at Sterling Sound (New York City)

Personnel

- Nelly – lyrics, main vocalist
- Jayson "KoKo" Bridges – music, percussion, production
- James D. "Sted-Fast" Hargrove II – music, guitar production
- Tim McGraw – featured vocalist
- Matthew Brauss – bass guitar
- Bryan Loss – drums
- Carl Nappa – recording
- Mike Eleopoulos – recording assistant
- Rich Travali – mixing
- Chip Karpells – mixing assistant
- Chris Gehringer – mastering

== Charts ==
=== Weekly charts ===
Chart (2004–2005)	Peak position
Australia (ARIA)	1
Australian Urban (ARIA)	1
Austria (Ö3 Austria Top 40)	7
Belgium (Ultratop 50 Flanders)	19
Belgium (Ultratip Bubbling Under Wallonia)	4
Canada CHR/Pop Top 30 (Radio & Records)	1
Canada Hot AC Top 30 (Radio & Records)	1
CIS Airplay (TopHit)	28
Czech Republic (IFPI)	4
Denmark (Tracklisten)	7
Europe (Eurochart Hot 100)	2
France (SNEP)	39
Germany (GfK)	8
Greece (IFPI)	40
Hungary (Rádiós Top 40)	4
Ireland (IRMA)	1
Netherlands (Dutch Top 40)	36
Netherlands (Single Top 100)	28
New Zealand (Recorded Music NZ)	2
Norway (VG-lista)	13
Romania (Romanian Top 100)	3
Russia Airplay (TopHit)	22
Scotland Singles (OCC)	1
Sweden (Sverigetopplistan)	16
Switzerland (Schweizer Hitparade)	6
UK Singles (OCC)	1
UK Hip Hop/R&B (OCC)	1
US Billboard Hot 100	3
US Adult Contemporary (Billboard)	34
US Adult Pop Airplay (Billboard)	16
US Hot R&B/Hip-Hop Songs (Billboard)	51
US Hot Rap Songs (Billboard)	7
US Pop Airplay (Billboard)	1
US Rhythmic Airplay (Billboard)	1

=== Year-end charts ===
Chart (2004)	Position
US Billboard Hot 100	96
US Mainstream Top 40 (Billboard)	58
US Rhythmic Top 40 (Billboard)	57

Chart (2005)	Position
Australia (ARIA)	5
Australian Urban (ARIA)	3
Austria (Ö3 Austria Top 40)	58
Europe (Eurochart Hot 100)	53
Germany (Media Control GfK)	53
New Zealand (RIANZ)	29
Romania (Romanian Top 100)	6
Russia Airplay (TopHit)	102
Switzerland (Schweizer Hitparade)	33
UK Singles (OCC)	25
US Billboard Hot 100	48
US Adult Top 40 (Billboard)	35
US Mainstream Top 40 (Billboard)	18
US Rhythmic Top 40 (Billboard)	39

=== Decade-end charts ===
Chart (2000–2009)	Position
Australia (ARIA)	65

== Certifications ==
Region	Certification	Certified units/sales
Australia (ARIA)	2× Platinum	140,000^{^}
New Zealand (RMNZ)	Platinum	30,000^{‡}
United Kingdom (BPI)	Gold	400,000^{‡}
United States (RIAA)	Platinum	1,000,000^{^}
United States (RIAA) Mastertone	Platinum	1,000,000^{*}
^{*} Sales figures based on certification alone.^{^} Shipments figures based on certification alone.^{‡} Sales+streaming figures based on certification alone.

== Release history ==
Region	Date	Format(s)	Label(s)	Ref.
United States	September 12, 2004	Digital download	Universal; Curb	
United States	November 15, 2004	Rhythmic contemporary; hot adult contemporary radio	Universal; Curb	
Australia	January 17, 2005	CD	Universal; Curb	
United Kingdom	February 21, 2005	12-inch vinyl; CD	Universal; Curb	

== See also ==
- List of number-one singles in Australia in 2005
- List of number-one singles of 2005 (Ireland)
- List of number-one singles from the 2000s (UK)
- List of Mainstream Top 40 number-one hits of 2004 (U.S.)
