= List of Billboard Mainstream Top 40 number-one songs of 2004 =

This is a list of songs which reached number one on the Billboard Mainstream Top 40 chart in 2004.

During 2004, a total of 12 singles hit number-one on the charts.

== Chart history ==
Issue date	Song	Artist(s)	Ref.
January 3	"Hey Ya!"	OutKast	
January 10	"Hey Ya!"	OutKast	
January 17	"Hey Ya!"	OutKast	
January 24	"Hey Ya!"	OutKast	
January 31	"Hey Ya!"	OutKast	
February 7	"Hey Ya!"	OutKast	
February 14	"The Way You Move"	OutKast featuring Sleepy Brown	
February 21	"The Way You Move"	OutKast featuring Sleepy Brown	
February 28	"The Way You Move"	OutKast featuring Sleepy Brown	
March 6	"With You"	Jessica Simpson	
March 13	"With You"	Jessica Simpson	
March 20	"Toxic"	Britney Spears	
March 27	"Toxic"	Britney Spears	
April 3	"Toxic"	Britney Spears	
April 10	"Toxic"	Britney Spears	
April 17	"Yeah!"	Usher featuring Lil Jon and Ludacris	
April 24	"Yeah!"	Usher featuring Lil Jon and Ludacris	
May 1	"Yeah!"	Usher featuring Lil Jon and Ludacris	
May 8	"This Love"	Maroon 5	
May 15	"This Love"	Maroon 5	
May 22	"This Love"	Maroon 5	
May 29	"The Reason"	Hoobastank	
June 5	"The Reason"	Hoobastank	
June 12	"The Reason"	Hoobastank	
June 19	"The Reason"	Hoobastank	
June 26	"The Reason"	Hoobastank	
July 3	"The Reason"	Hoobastank	
July 10	"The Reason"	Hoobastank	
July 17	"The Reason"	Hoobastank	
July 24	"Leave (Get Out)"	JoJo	
July 31	"Leave (Get Out)"	JoJo	
August 7	"Leave (Get Out)"	JoJo	
August 14	"Leave (Get Out)"	JoJo	
August 21	"Leave (Get Out)"	JoJo	
August 28	"Pieces of Me"	Ashlee Simpson	
September 4	"Pieces of Me"	Ashlee Simpson	
September 11	"Pieces of Me"	Ashlee Simpson	
September 18	"Pieces of Me"	Ashlee Simpson	
September 25	"Pieces of Me"	Ashlee Simpson	
October 2	"She Will Be Loved"	Maroon 5	
October 9	"She Will Be Loved"	Maroon 5	
October 16	"My Happy Ending"	Avril Lavigne	
October 23	"She Will Be Loved"	Maroon 5	
October 30	"She Will Be Loved"	Maroon 5	
November 6	"Over and Over"	Nelly featuring Tim McGraw	
November 13	"Over and Over"	Nelly featuring Tim McGraw	
November 20	"Over and Over"	Nelly featuring Tim McGraw	
November 27	"Over and Over"	Nelly featuring Tim McGraw	
December 4	"Over and Over"	Nelly featuring Tim McGraw	
December 11	"Over and Over"	Nelly featuring Tim McGraw	
December 18	"Over and Over"	Nelly featuring Tim McGraw	
December 25	"Over and Over"	Nelly featuring Tim McGraw	

== See also ==
- 2004 in music
