= Do You Want Fries with That =

Single by Tim McGraw

from the album Live Like You Were Dying
- Released: May 23, 2005
- Recorded: 2004
- Genre: Country; comedy
- Length: 3:59
- Label: Curb
- Songwriters: Casey Beathard; Kerry Kurt Phillips
- Producers: Byron Gallimore; Tim McGraw; Darran Smith

Tim McGraw singles chronology
"Drugs or Jesus" (2005)	"Do You Want Fries with That" (2005)	"Like We Never Loved at All" (2005)

"Do You Want Fries with That" is a song written by Casey Beathard and Kerry Kurt Phillips, and recorded by American country music artist Tim McGraw. It was released in May 2005 as the fourth single from McGraw's 2004 album Live Like You Were Dying. The song peaked at number 5 on the U.S. Billboard Hot Country Songs chart.

== Content ==
"Do You Want Fries with That" is a moderate up-tempo. The song's male narrator is an employee at a fast-food restaurant. Having just lost his wife and kids to another man, he meets the wife's new partner at the drive-through window. The narrator further explains that he has been living in near poverty since the other man practically stole his previous lifestyle, then sarcastically asks him "Do you want fries with that?"

== Chart positions ==
Chart (2005)	Peak position
Canada Country (Radio & Records)	3
US Hot Country Songs (Billboard)	5
US Billboard Hot 100	59

=== Year-end charts ===
Chart (2005)	Position
US Country Songs (Billboard)	32
