= List of RPM number-one country singles of 1966 =

These are the Canadian number-one country songs of 1966, per the RPM Country Tracks chart.

Issue date	Title	Artist	Source
January 3	Shadows of Your Heart	Dianne Leigh	
January 10	Shadows of Your Heart	Dianne Leigh	
January 17	Iron Town	Rhythm Pals	
January 24	Iron Town	Rhythm Pals	
January 31	Iron Town	Rhythm Pals	
February 7	Iron Town	Rhythm Pals	
February 14	Iron Town	Rhythm Pals	
February 21	Don't Knock on My Door	The Canadian Sweethearts	
February 28	This They Say Is Me	Rhythm Pals	
March 7	This They Say Is Me	Rhythm Pals	
March 14	The Auctioneer	Irwin Prescott	
December 5	Whistling on the River	Mercey Brothers	
December 12	Whistling on the River	Mercey Brothers	
December 19	Whistling on the River	Mercey Brothers	
December 26	Whistling on the River	Mercey Brothers	

== See also ==
- 1966 in music
