= List of number-one country singles of 2012 (Canada) =

Canada Country was a chart published weekly by Billboard magazine.

This 50-position chart lists the most popular country music songs, calculated weekly by airplay on 31 country music stations across the country as monitored by Nielsen BDS. Songs are ranked by total plays. As with most other Billboard charts, the Canada Country chart features a rule for when a song enters recurrent rotation. A song is declared recurrent if it has been on the chart longer than 30 weeks and is lower than number 20 in rank.

These are the Canadian number-one country singles of 2012, per the BDS Canada Country Airplay chart.

Note that Billboard publishes charts with an issue date approximately 7–10 days in advance.

Issue date	Country Song	Artist	Ref.
January 7	"Drink in My Hand"	Eric Church	
January 14	"Drink in My Hand"	Eric Church	
January 21	"Drink in My Hand"	Eric Church	
January 28	"I Don't Want This Night to End"	Luke Bryan	
February 4	"I Don't Want This Night to End"	Luke Bryan	
February 11	"You Gonna Fly"	Keith Urban	
February 18	"You Gonna Fly"	Keith Urban	
February 25	"You Gonna Fly"	Keith Urban	
March 3	"You"	Chris Young	
March 10	"Home"	Dierks Bentley	
March 17	"Home"	Dierks Bentley	
March 24	"Dancin' Away with My Heart"	Lady Antebellum	
March 31	"Ours"	Taylor Swift	
April 7	"Dancin' Away with My Heart"	Lady Antebellum	
April 14	"Canadian Girls"	Dean Brody	
April 21	"Drink on It"	Blake Shelton	
April 28	"Drink on It"	Blake Shelton	
May 5	"Drink on It"	Blake Shelton	
May 12	"Over You"	Miranda Lambert	
May 19	"Over You"	Miranda Lambert	
May 26	"Banjo"	Rascal Flatts	
June 2	"Good Girl"	Carrie Underwood	
June 9	"Springsteen"	Eric Church	
June 16	"Springsteen"	Eric Church	
June 23	"Somethin' 'Bout a Truck"	Kip Moore	
June 30	"Somethin' 'Bout a Truck"	Kip Moore	
July 7	"Drunk on You"	Luke Bryan	
July 14	"Even If It Breaks Your Heart"	Eli Young Band	
July 21	"Even If It Breaks Your Heart"	Eli Young Band	
July 28	"5-1-5-0"	Dierks Bentley	
August 4	"Come Over"	Kenny Chesney	
August 11	"Come Over"	Kenny Chesney	
August 18	"Come Over"	Kenny Chesney	
August 25	"Over"	Blake Shelton	
September 1	"Over"	Blake Shelton	
September 8	"Pontoon"	Little Big Town	
September 15	"Pontoon"	Little Big Town	
September 22	"Pontoon"	Little Big Town	
September 29	"Pontoon"	Little Big Town	
October 6	"Blown Away"	Carrie Underwood	
October 13	"Blown Away"	Carrie Underwood	
October 20	"Take a Little Ride"	Jason Aldean	
October 27	"Wanted"	Hunter Hayes	
November 3	"Kiss Tomorrow Goodbye"	Luke Bryan	
November 10	"Kiss Tomorrow Goodbye"	Luke Bryan	
November 17	"Kiss Tomorrow Goodbye"	Luke Bryan	
November 24	"Kiss Tomorrow Goodbye"	Luke Bryan	
December 1	"Cruise"	Florida Georgia Line	
December 8	"Cruise"	Florida Georgia Line	
December 15	"The One That Got Away"	Jake Owen	
December 22	"Goodbye in Her Eyes"	Zac Brown Band	
December 29	"Goodbye in Her Eyes"	Zac Brown Band	

== See also ==
- 2012 in music
- List of number-one country singles of 2012 (U.S.)
