= List of number-one country singles of 2022 (Canada) =

Canada Country was a chart published weekly by Billboard magazine.

This 50-position chart lists the most popular country music songs, calculated weekly by airplay on 46 country music stations across Canada as monitored by Nielsen BDS. Songs are ranked by total plays. As with most other Billboard charts, the Canada Country chart features a rule for when a song enters recurrent rotation. A song is declared recurrent if it has been on the chart longer than 30 weeks and is lower than number 20 in rank.

These are the Canadian number-one country singles of 2022, per the BDS Canada Country Airplay chart.

Issue date	Country Song	Artist	Ref.
January 1	"One Mississippi"	Kane Brown	
January 8	"Buy Dirt"	Jordan Davis featuring Luke Bryan	
January 15	"Buy Dirt"	Jordan Davis featuring Luke Bryan	
January 22	"One Mississippi"	Kane Brown	
January 29	"You Should Probably Leave"	Chris Stapleton	
February 5	"You Should Probably Leave"	Chris Stapleton	
February 12	"Wild Hearts"	Keith Urban	
February 19	"23"	Sam Hunt	
February 26	"23"	Sam Hunt	
March 5	"New Old Trucks"	James Barker Band featuring Dierks Bentley	
March 12	"Sand in My Boots"	Morgan Wallen	
March 19	"Never Wanted to Be That Girl"	Carly Pearce and Ashley McBryde	
March 26	"Never Wanted to Be That Girl"	Carly Pearce and Ashley McBryde	
April 2	"'Til You Can't"	Cody Johnson	
April 9	"'Til You Can't"	Cody Johnson	
April 16	"'Til You Can't"	Cody Johnson	
April 23	"'Til You Can't"	Cody Johnson	
April 30	"'Til You Can't"	Cody Johnson	
May 7	"Hide from a Broken Heart"	Dallas Smith	
May 14	"Never Say Never"	Cole Swindell and Lainey Wilson	
May 21	"Never Say Never"	Cole Swindell and Lainey Wilson	
May 28	"AA"	Walker Hayes	
June 4	"She Don't Know"	Jade Eagleson	
June 11	"AA"	Walker Hayes	
June 18	"Pickup"	MacKenzie Porter	
June 25	"AA"	Walker Hayes	
July 2	"Wasted on You"	Morgan Wallen	
July 9	"Last Night Lonely"	Jon Pardi	
July 16	"Last Night Lonely"	Jon Pardi	
July 23	"11 Beers"	The Reklaws and Jake Owen	
July 30	"Like I Love Country Music"	Kane Brown	
August 6	"Like I Love Country Music"	Kane Brown	
August 13	"Like I Love Country Music"	Kane Brown	
August 20	"Last Night Lonely"	Jon Pardi	
August 27	"Like I Love Country Music"	Kane Brown	
September 3	"Like I Love Country Music"	Kane Brown	
September 10	"Like I Love Country Music"	Kane Brown	
September 17	"The Kind of Love We Make"	Luke Combs	
Septbember 24	"The Kind of Love We Make"	Luke Combs	
October 1	"Where'd You Learn How to Do That"	Dean Brody	
October 8	"She Had Me at Heads Carolina"	Cole Swindell	
October 15	"She Had Me at Heads Carolina"	Cole Swindell	
October 22	"5 Foot 9"	Tyler Hubbard	
October 29	"You Proof"	Morgan Wallen	
November 5	"Half of Me"	Thomas Rhett Featuring Riley Green	
November 12	"You Proof"	Morgan Wallen	
November 19	"You Proof"	Morgan Wallen	
November 26	"You Proof"	Morgan Wallen	
December 3	"Fall in Love"	Bailey Zimmerman	
December 10	"Whiskey On You"	Nate Smith	
December 17	"Whiskey On You"	Nate Smith	
December 24	"Whiskey On You"	Nate Smith	
December 31	"Whiskey On You"	Nate Smith	

== See also ==
- 2022 in country music
- List of Billboard number-one country songs of 2022
