= List of number-one country singles of 2006 (Canada) =

Canada Country was a chart published weekly by Billboard magazine. The chart was published from July 22, 2006, until November 2, 2024. This 50-position chart lists the most popular country music songs, calculated weekly by airplay on 31 country music stations across the country as monitored by Nielsen BDS. Songs are ranked by total plays. As with most other Billboard charts, the Canada Country chart features a rule for when a song enters recurrent rotation. A song is declared recurrent if it has been on the chart longer than 30 weeks and is lower than number 20 in rank.

Prior to the current chart published by Billboard, an airplay chart following a similar methodology was published by Radio & Records. The R&R Canada Country Top 30 chart listed the most popular songs on country radio based on airplay from 21 Mediabase stations. The list was expanded to 40 positions effective as of the May 19, 2006 issue. The Radio & Records chart featured a rule whereby any song below rank 15 that has been on the chart 20 or more weeks will be moved to recurrent rotation.

These are the Canadian number-one country singles of 2006, per the BDS Canada Country Airplay chart and R&R Canada Country Top 30 chart.

Note that Billboard publishes charts with an issue date approximately 7–10 days in advance.

== R&R Canada Country ==
Issue date	Country Song	Artist	Ref.
January 13	"Jesus, Take the Wheel"	Carrie Underwood	
January 20	"Jesus, Take the Wheel"	Carrie Underwood	
January 27	"Jesus, Take the Wheel"	Carrie Underwood	
February 3	"Jesus, Take the Wheel"	Carrie Underwood	
February 10	"Jesus, Take the Wheel"	Carrie Underwood	
February 17	"Jesus, Take the Wheel"	Carrie Underwood	
February 24	"Jesus, Take the Wheel"	Carrie Underwood	
March 3	"Living in Fast Forward"	Kenny Chesney	
March 10	"Living in Fast Forward"	Kenny Chesney	
March 17	"Living in Fast Forward"	Kenny Chesney	
March 24	"Living in Fast Forward"	Kenny Chesney	
March 31	"Living in Fast Forward"	Kenny Chesney	(Note: The March 31 issue of Radio & Records is not archived; the peak for this week is derived from the "Last Week" position in the April 7 issue.)
April 7	"Living in Fast Forward"	Kenny Chesney	
April 14	"What Hurts the Most"	Rascal Flatts	
April 21	"What Hurts the Most"	Rascal Flatts	
April 28	"The Lucky One"	Faith Hill	
May 5	"The Lucky One"	Faith Hill	
May 12	"The Lucky One"	Faith Hill	
May 19	"When the Stars Go Blue"	Tim McGraw	
May 26	"When the Stars Go Blue"	Tim McGraw	
June 2	"When the Stars Go Blue"	Tim McGraw	
June 9	"When the Stars Go Blue"	Tim McGraw	
June 16	"The World"	Brad Paisley	
June 23	"Summertime"	Kenny Chesney	
June 30	"Summertime"	Kenny Chesney	(Note: The June 30 issue of Radio & Records is not archived; the peak for this week is derived from the "Last Week" position in the July 7 issue.)
July 7	"Summertime"	Kenny Chesney	
July 14	"Summertime"	Kenny Chesney	
July 21	"Summertime"	Kenny Chesney	
July 28	"A Little Too Late"	Toby Keith	
August 4	"A Little Too Late"	Toby Keith	

== Billboard Canada Country ==
Issue date	Country Song	Artist	Ref.
July 22	"Summertime"	Kenny Chesney	
July 29	"Summertime"	Kenny Chesney	
August 5	"A Little Too Late"	Toby Keith	
August 12	"A Little Too Late"	Toby Keith	
August 19	"A Little Too Late"	Toby Keith	
August 26	"A Little Too Late"	Toby Keith	
September 2	"If You're Going Through Hell (Before The Devil Even Knows)"	Rodney Atkins	
September 9	"If You're Going Through Hell (Before The Devil Even Knows)"	Rodney Atkins	
September 16	"Sunshine and Summertime"	Faith Hill	
September 23	"Leave the Pieces"	The Wreckers	
September 30	"Give It Away"	George Strait	
October 7	"Give It Away"	George Strait	
October 14	"Give It Away"	George Strait	
October 21	"Once in a Lifetime"	Keith Urban	
October 28	"Before He Cheats"	Carrie Underwood	
November 4	"Before He Cheats"	Carrie Underwood	
November 11	"Before He Cheats"	Carrie Underwood	
November 18	"Before He Cheats"	Carrie Underwood	
November 25	"Before He Cheats"	Carrie Underwood	
December 2	"Before He Cheats"	Carrie Underwood	
December 9	"Want To"	Sugarland	
December 16	"My Wish"	Rascal Flatts	
December 23	"My Wish"	Rascal Flatts	
December 30	"My Wish"	Rascal Flatts	

== See also ==
- 2006 in music
- List of number-one country singles of 2006 (U.S.)
