= List of number-one country singles of 2021 (Canada) =

Canada Country was a chart published weekly by Billboard magazine.

This 50-position chart lists the most popular country music songs, calculated weekly by airplay on 46 country music stations across the country as monitored by Nielsen BDS. Songs are ranked by total plays. As with most other Billboard charts, the Canada Country chart features a rule for when a song enters recurrent rotation. A song is declared recurrent if it has been on the chart longer than 30 weeks and is lower than number 20 in rank.

These are the Canadian number-one country singles of 2021, per the BDS Canada Country Airplay chart.

Issue date	Country Song	Artist	Ref.
January 2	"Hole in the Bottle"	Kelsea Ballerini	
January 9	"Hole in the Bottle"	Kelsea Ballerini	
January 16	"Hole in the Bottle"	Kelsea Ballerini	
January 23	"A Few Good Stories"	Brett Kissel	
January 30	"Better Together"	Luke Combs	
February 6	"Some Things Never Change"	Dallas Smith feat. Hardy	
February 13	"Down to One"	Luke Bryan	
February 20	"Down to One"	Luke Bryan	
February 27	"Down to One"	Luke Bryan	
March 6	"What's Your Country Song"	Thomas Rhett	
March 13	"Long Live"	Florida Georgia Line	
March 20	"Just the Way"	Parmalee and Blanco Brown	
March 27	"Hell of a View"	Eric Church	
April 3	"Boys"	Dean Brody feat. Mickey Guyton	
April 10	"Hell of a View"	Eric Church	
April 17	"River's Still Running"	High Valley	
April 24	"Settling Down"	Miranda Lambert	
May 1	"One Too Many"	Keith Urban with Pink	
May 8	"Made for You"	Jake Owen	
May 15	"Forever After All"	Luke Combs	
May 22	"Forever After All"	Luke Combs	
May 29	"Forever After All"	Luke Combs	
June 5	"Forever After All"	Luke Combs	
June 12	"Forever After All"	Luke Combs	
June 19	"Famous Friends"	Chris Young and Kane Brown	
June 26	"Famous Friends"	Chris Young and Kane Brown	
July 3	"All Night to Figure It Out"	Jade Eagleson	
July 10	"Make a Life, Not a Living"	Brett Kissel	
July 17	"Blame It on You"	Jason Aldean	
July 24	"Blame It on You"	Jason Aldean	
July 31	"Country Again"	Thomas Rhett	
August 7	"Country Again"	Thomas Rhett	
August 14	"Waves"	Luke Bryan	
August 21	"Waves"	Luke Bryan	
August 28	"Waves"	Luke Bryan	
September 4	"Waves"	Luke Bryan	
September 11	"Drinkin' Beer. Talkin' God. Amen."	Chase Rice	
September 18	"I Was on a Boat That Day"	Old Dominion	
September 25	"Over All Over Again"	James Barker Band	
October 2	"We Didn't Have Much"	Justin Moore	
October 9	"I Was on a Boat That Day"	Old Dominion	
October 16	"Memory I Don't Mess With"	Lee Brice	
October 23	"Boy Like Me"	Aaron Goodvin	
October 30	"If I Didn't Love You"	Jason Aldean and Carrie Underwood	
November 6	"Cold As You"	Luke Combs	
November 13	"Cold As You"	Luke Combs	
November 20	"Cold As You"	Luke Combs	
November 27	"Cold As You"	Luke Combs	
December 4	"Cold As You"	Luke Combs	
December 11	"More Drinkin' Than Fishin'"	Jade Eagleson and Dean Brody	
December 18	"Buy Dirt"	Jordan Davis and Luke Bryan	
December 25	"Buy Dirt"	Jordan Davis and Luke Bryan	

== See also ==
- 2021 in country music
- List of Billboard number-one country songs of 2021
