= List of number-one country singles of 2010 (Canada) =

Canada Country was a chart published weekly by Billboard magazine.

This 50-position chart lists the most popular country music songs, calculated weekly by airplay on 31 country music stations across the country as monitored by Nielsen BDS. Songs are ranked by total plays. As with most other Billboard charts, the Canada Country chart features a rule for when a song enters recurrent rotation. A song is declared recurrent if it has been on the chart longer than 30 weeks and is lower than number 20 in rank.

These are the Canadian number-one country singles of 2010, per the BDS Canada Country Airplay chart.

Note that Billboard publishes charts with an issue date approximately 7–10 days in advance.

Issue date	Country Song	Artist	Ref.
January 2	"Consider Me Gone"	Reba (Note: Reba McEntire was credited simply as "Reba" on the releases of "Consider Me Gone" and "Turn on the Radio".)	
January 9	"Southern Voice"	Tim McGraw	
January 16	"Southern Voice"	Tim McGraw	
January 23	"Southern Voice"	Tim McGraw	
January 30	"American Saturday Night"	Brad Paisley	
February 6	"American Saturday Night"	Brad Paisley	
February 13	"American Saturday Night"	Brad Paisley	
February 20	"American Saturday Night"	Brad Paisley	
February 27	"The Truth"	Jason Aldean	
March 6	"That's How Country Boys Roll"	Billy Currington	
March 13	"'Til Summer Comes Around"	Keith Urban	
March 20	"That's How Country Boys Roll"	Billy Currington	
March 27	"Why Don't We Just Dance"	Josh Turner	
April 3	"American Honey"	Lady Antebellum	
April 10	"American Honey"	Lady Antebellum	
April 17	"American Honey"	Lady Antebellum	
April 24	"American Honey"	Lady Antebellum	
May 1	"American Honey"	Lady Antebellum	
May 8	"American Honey"	Lady Antebellum	
May 15	"Gimmie That Girl"	Joe Nichols	
May 22	"Gimmie That Girl"	Joe Nichols	
May 29	"Gimmie That Girl"	Joe Nichols	
June 5	"Water"	Brad Paisley	
June 12	"Water"	Brad Paisley	
June 19	"Water"	Brad Paisley	
June 26	"Water"	Brad Paisley	
July 3	"Water"	Brad Paisley	
July 10	"Water"	Brad Paisley	
July 17	"Water"	Brad Paisley	
July 24	"I'm In"	Keith Urban	
July 31	"I'm In"	Keith Urban	
August 7	"I'm In"	Keith Urban	
August 14	"I'm In"	Keith Urban	
August 21	"I'm In"	Keith Urban	
August 28	"I'm In"	Keith Urban	
September 4	"Pretty Good at Drinkin' Beer"	Billy Currington	
September 11	"Pretty Good at Drinkin' Beer"	Billy Currington	
September 18	"Pretty Good at Drinkin' Beer"	Billy Currington	
September 25	"Pretty Good at Drinkin' Beer"	Billy Currington	
October 2	"Pretty Good at Drinkin' Beer"	Billy Currington	
October 9	"Our Kind of Love"	Lady Antebellum	
October 16	"Roll with It"	Easton Corbin	
October 23	"The Boys of Fall"	Kenny Chesney	
October 30	"Anything Like Me"	Brad Paisley	
November 6	"Anything Like Me"	Brad Paisley	
November 13	"Anything Like Me"	Brad Paisley	
November 20	"Turn On the Radio"	Reba	
November 27	"Anything Like Me"	Brad Paisley	
December 4	"As She's Walking Away"	Zac Brown Band	
December 11	"As She's Walking Away"	Zac Brown Band	
December 18	"As She's Walking Away"	Zac Brown Band	
December 25	"Felt Good on My Lips"	Tim McGraw	

== See also ==
- 2010 in music
- List of number-one country singles of 2010 (U.S.)
