= Fancy Free (Canadian TV program) =

- Genre: Music variety show
- Written by: Allan Manings; Pat Patterson
- Presented by: Alan Miller
- Country of origin: Canada
- Original language: English
- No. of seasons: 1

Production
- Producer: Syd Wayne

Original release
- Network: CBC Television
- Release: 6 October – 29 December 1960

Related
- Swing Gently

Fancy Free is a Canadian music variety television program that aired on CBC Television in 1960.

== Premise ==
Alan Miller hosted this successor to the CBC program Swing Gently. Episodes of this program were themed after a particular year and accompanied by costumes, film segments and music which represented that time. Regular performers included Allan Blye, the Rudy Toth orchestra, The Billy Van Four and Ruth Walker. Visiting artists included Orson Bean (American comedian/actor), Pam Hyatt (comedian), Doug Romaine (singer) and Señor Wences (ventriloquist). Some episodes featured dance troupe The Canadettes.

== Scheduling ==
The half-hour program aired on Thursdays at 9:00 p.m. (Eastern) from 6 October to 29 December 1960.
