= My Old Friend =

2005 single recorded by Tim McGraw

Single by Tim McGraw

from the album Live Like You Were Dying
- Released: September 20, 2005
- Recorded: 2004
- Genre: Country
- Length: 3:37
- Label: Curb
- Songwriters: Craig Wiseman; Steve McEwan
- Producers: Byron Gallimore; Tim McGraw; Darran Smith

Tim McGraw singles chronology
| "Like We Never Loved at All" (2005) | "My Old Friend" (2005) | "When the Stars Go Blue" (2006) |

"My Old Friend" is a song written by Craig Wiseman and Steve McEwan, and recorded by American country music artist Tim McGraw. It was released in September 2005 as the fifth and final single from his album Live Like You Were Dying. It peaked at number 6 on the country music charts.

== Content ==
The song is a ballad, in which the narrator bids farewell to an old friend who has died and hopes the song will help people remember him.

== Critical reception ==
Kevin John Coyne, reviewing the song for Country Universe, gave it a positive rating. He summed up the review by saying that it is "one of the best singles of his career".

== Chart positions ==
The song debuted at number 55 on the U.S. Billboard Hot Country Singles & Tracks for the week ending October 8, 2005.

| Chart (2005–2006) | Peak position |
|---|---|
| Canada Country (Radio & Records) | 4 |
| US Hot Country Songs (Billboard) | 6 |
| US Billboard Hot 100 | 79 |

=== Year-end charts ===
| Chart (2006) | Position |
|---|---|
| US Country Songs (Billboard) | 48 |
