= She's My Kind of Rain =

Single by Tim McGraw

from the album Tim McGraw and the Dancehall Doctors
- Released: January 20, 2003
- Recorded: 2002
- Genre: Country pop, adult contemporary
- Length: 4:15 (album version) 4:33 (music video version)
- Label: Curb
- Songwriters: Tommy Lee James; Robin Lerner
- Producers: Byron Gallimore; Tim McGraw; Darran Smith

Tim McGraw singles chronology
"Tiny Dancer" (2002)	"She's My Kind of Rain" (2003)	"Real Good Man" (2003)

"She's My Kind of Rain" is a song written by Tommy Lee James and Robin Lerner, and recorded by American country music artist Tim McGraw. It was released in January 2003 as the third single from his album Tim McGraw and the Dancehall Doctors. It peaked at number 2 on the U.S. Billboard Hot Country Songs chart, and at number 27 on the U.S. Billboard Hot 100 chart.

== Content ==
"She's My Kind of Rain" is a ballad in which the narrator describes his wife in an abstract fashion.

== Critical reception ==
The song earned a Broadcast Music Incorporated award for reaching Number One on the former Radio & Records country singles charts. It also received a Grammy Award nomination for Best Country Vocal Performance-Male at the 46th Grammy Awards.

== Music video ==
The music video was directed by Tim's usual director of choice: Sherman Halsey. McGraw's wife, Faith Hill is featured at the end of the video, as are their three daughters, Gracie, Maggie and Audrey. It was filmed in London, England, and shows Tim walking with a cloak on, and him performing the song in a royal dining room of a restaurant. It premiered on CMT on November 22, 2002, two months before its official release as a single; the music video version is 4:33, complete with a full ending. However, this version is unavailable on any of McGraw's greatest hits compilations.

== Chart positions ==
"She's My Kind of Rain" re-entered the charts as an official single at number 47 on the U.S. Billboard Hot Country Singles & Tracks for the chart week of January 25, 2003. The song reached a peak of number 2 on the Billboard country singles charts in May 2003, behind Darryl Worley's "Have You Forgotten?".

Chart (2003)	Peak position
US Hot Country Songs (Billboard)	2
US Billboard Hot 100	27

=== Year-end charts ===
Chart (2003)	Position
US Country Songs (Billboard)	23

== Certifications ==
Region	Certification	Certified units/sales
United States (RIAA)	Gold	500,000^{‡}
^{‡} Sales+streaming figures based on certification alone.
