= Steve McEwan =

- Born: United Kingdom
- Occupations: Songwriter, artist, and musician

Steve McEwan is a multi Grammy award-winning British songwriter, artist, and musician. His songs have been recorded by country music artists including Chris Stapleton, Kenny Chesney, Carrie Underwood, Faith Hill, and Keith Urban. Outside of country, he has also written with rock and pop stars such as Kylie Minogue, Roger Daltrey, David Archuleta, James Morrison, James Blunt, Jackson Browne, James Bay, and James Arthur as well as rapper Eminem. His song "Cry" with Jon Batiste won best American Roots song and Best Performance at the 2022 Grammys and he also won overall Best Album for "We Are". In 2024 he won the Grammy for Best Song for Social Change for "Refugee" with the artist K'naan.

== Early career ==
Steve first began playing music at the age of 10 when his family relocated from Scotland to South Africa. He was just 17 when Miriam Makeba, the queen of African music, recorded his song "I Still Long for You". Lucky Dube then recorded "Khululeka" which he had co-written in an African band called Friends First. Steve then moved to London and joined World Party led by the influential Karl Wallinger. After a year-long tour, he signed his own deal with Arista. He also worked with pop star Robbie Williams, playing guitar and singing on Robbie's 1997, 1998 and 2000 albums, as well as Joe Cocker's No Ordinary World.

In 2000, Steve formed his own band called UnAmerican. The group recorded its Universal/Estupendo debut album in Memphis and went on the road opening for Neil Young and Crazy Horse (band) and The Who. During that time, Steve co-wrote songs with The Who's lead singer Roger Daltrey. He produced one of the songs called "A Second Out" which appeared on Daltrey's solo CD in 2004. UnAmerican then signed with Lost Highway and recorded their second album but it was never released.

== Songwriting career ==
In 2001, Steve had the opportunity to write with country songwriter Craig Wiseman in London. He was then invited to a writer retreat in Nashville put together by BMG music publishing. That was where Steve, Craig and Naoise Sheridan co-wrote "Young", which became a huge hit for Kenny Chesney the following year. During that same visit to Nashville, Steve's UnAmerican songs came to the attention of Faith Hill, who recorded "If This Is the End" and "Wicked" for her three million selling CD Cry of 2002. From there Steve continued to have successful singles on country radio: Tim McGraw's "My Old Friend" and Brooks and Dunn's "That's What It's All About". "Summertime" soon followed and was another massive Kenny Chesney hit co-written by Steve, and then came the No. 1 single "Just A Dream" by artist Carrie Underwood. His regular trips to Nashville have resulted in four number 1 singles and cuts on more than 50 million albums worldwide.

Steve never left his pop/rock roots as his success writing for that genre continued. He co-wrote four songs on pop/R&B sensation James Morrison's 2007 release called Undiscovered. He also wrote "One of the Brightest Stars" with James Blunt for the 2007 All the Lost Souls album and had two songs on pop star David Archuleta's debut album in 2008.

Steve has co-written Keith Urban's No. 1 single "Only You Can Love Me This Way". Three of Steve's songs can be found on Carrie Underwood's 3 November 2009 release Play On, as well as other 2009 releases on Leslie Mendelson (Rykodisc), Brooke White (June Baby Records), Jesse James (IDJ/Mercury) and Foreigner (Rhino Entertainment).

In 2010, McEwan co-wrote the track "Space Bound" for Eminem and also sang the hook. The song is the fourth single off the Recovery album.

Currently, Steve is working on projects with Steve Aoki, K'Naan, and Jon Batiste to be released in early 2021.

Steve McEwan is administered by SONGS of Kobalt Music Group.

== Discography ==
2023 - “Trust” - Chris Stapleton
2023 - “Refugee” - K’naan
2023 - “Love Come Back To Me” - Phillip Phillips
2022 - "True Blood" - James Arthur
2022 - "Mood Swings" - Emma Klein
2021 - "Cry" - Jon Batiste
2020 - "If You Can't Say Anything Nice" - Leslie Mendelson
2020 - "Fall With You" - Emma McGrath
2019 - "A Human Touch" - Jackson Browne and Leslie Mendelson
2019 - "Sulwe's Song" - Lupita Nyong’o
2019 - "You Got This" - Kelsey Waters
2018 - Change For The Good" - The Wandering Hearts
2018 - Without You" - Anderson East
2018 - "Don't Stop" - Jon Batiste
2018 - "Low Blow" - Kylie Minogue
2018 - "Golden" - Kylie Minogue
2018 - "Stop Me from Falling" - Kylie Minogue
2018 - "Dancing" - Kylie Minogue
2017 - "I Don't Trust Myself" - Sara Evans
2017 - "Diving In Deep" - Sara Evans
2017 - "Careless Love" - Kimock
2017 - "Satellite City" - Kimock
2017 - "Jericho" - Leslie Mendelson
2017 - "Love You Tonight" - Leslie Mendelson
2017 - "I Know You Won't" - Rascal Flatts
2017 - "Forever"- Kat Edmonson
2016 - "Sober"- James Arthur
2016 - "If Only" -James Arthur
2016 - "Love And Hate" - Arrow Benjamin
2016 - "Everybody Wants To Be Loved" - Martina McBride
2016 - "Strangers" - Bobby Bazini
2016 - "Hole In The World" - Nashville Soundtrack
2016 - "Bombshell" - Ashley Monroe
2015 - "Washington State Fight Song" - Matt Nathanson
2015 – "First Flight Out" – The Shires
2015 – "If You Ever Want To Be in Love" – James Bay
2014 – "It's Not Like Me" – The Mastersons
2013 – "Blue on Blue" – James Blunt
2013 – "Trust" – Alfie Boe
2013 – "Never Like This" – Danielle Bradbery
2013 – "All Cried Out" – Kree Harrison
2012 – "Time Flies" – Kenny Chesney
2012 – "No One Will Ever Love You" – The Music of Nashville: Season 1 Volume 1
2012 – "Keep Coming Back" – Haley Reinhart
2012 – "Wake Up (Dreaming of You) – Mark Haze
2011 – "Grace" – Nerina Pallot
2011 – "Kiss Goodbye" – Little Big Town
2011 – "Tell Me I'm Not Dreaming" – Katherine Jenkins
2011 – "Stairway to the Stars" – Dia Frampton
2011 – "She's a Wildflower" – Lauren Alaina
2011 – "Tupelo" – Lauren Alaina
2011 – "Grace" – Nerina Pallot
2010 – "Space Bound" – Eminem
2009 – "I Know You Better Than That" – Leslie Mendelson
2009 – "Easy Love" – Leslie Mendelson
2009 – "I See Myself With You" – Leslie Mendelson
2009 – "So Far So Bad" – Leslie Mendelson
2009 – "If I Don't Stop Loving You" – Leslie Mendelson
2009 – "No Easy Way Out" – Leslie Mendelson
2009 – "Hit The Spot" – Leslie Mendelson
2009 – "Goodnight" – Leslie Mendelson
2009 – "The Rest of London" – Leslie Mendelson
2009 – "Out of the Ashes" – Brooke White
2009 – "Be Careful" – Brooke White
2009 – "Inevitable" – Jesse James
2009 – "I Can't Give Up" – Foreigner
2009 – "Lonely" – Foreigner
2009 – "What Can I Say" – Carrie Underwood
2009 – "This Time" – Carrie Underwood
2009 – "Someday When I Stop Loving You" – Carrie Underwood
2009 – "Touch My Hand" – David Archuleta
2009 – "Barriers" – David Archuleta
2009 – "Only You Can Love Me This Way" – Keith Urban
2009 – "Love Is the Lesson" – Billy Ray Cyrus
2008 – "I'm All for Love" – Serena Ryder
2008 – "My Hallelujah Song" – Julianne Hough
2008 – "Found" – Josh Gracin
2008 – "Just a Dream" – Carrie Underwood
2007 – "Get Out of This Town" – Carrie Underwood
2007 – "I Know You Won't" – Carrie Underwood
2007 – "The More Boys I Meet" – Carrie Underwood
2007 – "One of the Brightest Stars" – James Blunt
2007 – "If I Had Your Name" – Martina McBride
2007 – "Comin' Home" – Tim McGraw
2007 – "Under the Influence" – James Morrison
2007 – "The Last Goodbye" – James Morrison
2007 – "How Come" – James Morrison
2006 – "Stronger" – Robert Randolph
2006 – "Gotta Keep Moving" – Kellie Pickler
2006 – "God Made Woman" – Keith Urban
2005 – "We're Young and Beautiful" – Carrie Underwood
2004 – "A Second Out" – Roger Daltrey
2005 – "Summertime" – Kenny Chesney
2005 – "My Old Friend" – Tim McGraw
2004 – "That's What It's All About" – Brooks & Dunn
2002 – "Young" – Kenny Chesney
2002 – "Wicked" – Faith Hill
2002 – "If This Is the End" – Faith Hill
2000 – "If This Is the End" – UnAmerican
2000 – "Wicked" – UnAmerican
2000 – "I Was Wrong" – UnAmerican
2000 – "Make Up Your Mind" – UnAmerican
2000 – "She's a Bomb" – UnAmerican
1991 – "Eyes on Tomorrow" – Miriam Makeba
1991 – "I Still Long For You" – Miriam Makeba
