= Real Good Man =

Single by Tim McGraw

from the album Tim McGraw and the Dancehall Doctors
- Released: May 19, 2003
- Recorded: 2002
- Genre: Country
- Length: 4:15
- Label: Curb
- Songwriters: Rivers Rutherford; George Teren
- Producers: Byron Gallimore; Tim McGraw; Darran Smith

Tim McGraw singles chronology
"She's My Kind of Rain" (2003)	"Real Good Man" (2003)	"Watch the Wind Blow By" (2003)

"Real Good Man" is a song written by Rivers Rutherford and George Teren and recorded by American country music singer Tim McGraw. It was released in May 2003 as the fourth single from McGraw’s 2002 album Tim McGraw and the Dancehall Doctors. The song reached number one on the US Billboard Hot Country Singles and Tracks (now Hot Country Songs) chart.

== Content ==
The narrator states to his significant other that while he may be a "bad boy", he is a "real good man".

== Critical reception ==
Rick Cohoon of Allmusic reviewed the song favorably, saying that the song "offers a unique melody". Cohoon goes on to say that McGraw can "party with the best of 'em" but also "touts his softer side complete with soft-as-velvet hands and a patriotic spirit".

== Music video ==
The music video, directed and produced by Sherman Halsey, and premiered on CMT on July 12, 2003. It was filmed live in concert and was released as a double-song video with "The Ride", a cover of the David Allan Coe hit. A special promotional single of this double-song performance was sent to radio stations. While the live version of "Real Good Man" did eventually appear on McGraw's Greatest Hits 3 CD, it did not contain "The Ride"; "The Ride" would appear on McGraw's 2016 Ultimate Collection 4-disc set.

== Chart positions ==
"Real Good Man" debuted at number 60 on the US Billboard Hot Country Singles & Tracks for the chart week of May 17, 2003.

=== Weekly charts ===
Chart (2003)	Peak position
US Hot Country Songs (Billboard)	1
US Billboard Hot 100	27

=== Year-end charts ===
Chart (2003)	Position
US Billboard Hot 100	99
US Country Songs (Billboard)	9

== Certifications ==
Certifications for Real Good Man
Region	Certification	Certified units/sales
United States (RIAA)	Platinum	1,000,000^{‡}
^{‡} Sales+streaming figures based on certification alone.
