= Fancy Free (Australian TV program) =

- Genre: Variety
- Presented by: Peter Smith
- Starring: Penny Loveday; The Dominoes; Janet Keyte
- Country of origin: Australia
- Original language: English

Production
- Running time: 30 minutes

Original release
- Network: ABC Television
- Release: 1 September – 6 October 1961

Fancy Free is an Australian music variety television program that aired in 1961 on ABC TV.

The show was hosted by Peter Smith, and featured vocalist Penny Loveday, The Dominoes and Janet Keyte. Guests in the first episode included Gaynor Bunning, Johnny Bohan, and Tony Jenkins.

The weekly series aired on Fridays, with the final episode broadcast 6 October 1961, though ABC series of the 1950s and 1960s tended to have short seasons.
