= Drugs or Jesus =

Single by Tim McGraw

from the album Live Like You Were Dying
- Released: January 17, 2005
- Recorded: 2004
- Genre: Country
- Length: 4:39
- Label: Curb
- Songwriters: Brett James; Chris Lindsey; Aimee Mayo; Troy Verges
- Producers: Byron Gallimore; Tim McGraw; Darran Smith

Tim McGraw singles chronology
"Over and Over" (2004)	"Drugs or Jesus" (2005)	"Do You Want Fries with That" (2005)

"Drugs or Jesus" is a song written by Brett James, Troy Verges, Aimee Mayo and Chris Lindsey, and recorded by American country music singer Tim McGraw. It was released in January 2005 as the third single from his album Live Like You Were Dying. It peaked at number 14, thus becoming his first single since "Two Steppin' Mind" in 1993 to miss the top ten (not counting "Tiny Dancer").

== Content ==
The narrator talks about how in his hometown, people follow their own paths in life and either choose drugs or Jesus.

== Critical reception ==
Kevin John Coyne, reviewing the song for Country Universe, gave it a positive rating. He says that the song is one of McGraw's best performances ever.

== Music video ==
The music video was directed and produced by Sherman Halsey, and premiered on CMT on January 21, 2005. It shows McGraw walking through an old house. He does not wear a cowboy hat, but rather a knit cap.

== Chart positions ==
Chart (2005)	Peak position
Canada Country (Radio & Records)	6
US Hot Country Songs (Billboard)	14
US Billboard Hot 100	87

=== Year-end charts ===
Chart (2005)	Position
US Country Songs (Billboard)	55
