= Red Rag Top =

Single by Tim McGraw

from the album Tim McGraw and the Dancehall Doctors
- Released: September 16, 2002
- Genre: Country
- Length: 4:43 (album version); 4:09 (radio edit)
- Label: Curb
- Songwriter: Jason White
- Producers: Byron Gallimore; Tim McGraw; Darran Smith

Tim McGraw singles chronology
"Unbroken" (2002)	"Red Rag Top" (2002)	"Tiny Dancer" (2002)

"Red Rag Top" is a song written and originally recorded by Jason White. It was later recorded by American country music artist Tim McGraw and released in September 2002 as the first single from McGraw’s album Tim McGraw and the Dancehall Doctors. McGraw's version peaked at number 5 on the US Billboard Hot Country Singles & Tracks (now Hot Country Songs) chart in early 2003 and reached number 40 on the Billboard Hot 100.

== Background and writing ==
The song was written by Jason Sandbrink White in 1997 and released on his independent album in 2001. White told USA Today that it was a song about an abortion but not an "abortion song". He went on to say that he was "trying to tell a story about a relationship that didn't work out, period."

== Content ==
The song's narrator recalls a past lover. He reflects on bittersweet memories from a youthful relationship, including a surprise pregnancy and the decision to get an abortion. This song was the subject of controversy due to the lyric that mentioned abortion ("We decided not to have a child"), and some radio stations banned the song.

== Critical reception ==
Rick Cohoon of AllMusic reviewed the song favorably, saying that the song is "wistful enough to have you tearing up right along with him". Cohoon says that "a simple and memorable chorus surrounded by innovative lyrics make this a recipe for success."

== Chart positions ==
"Red Rag Top" debuted at number 34 on the US Billboard Hot Country Singles & Tracks for the chart week of September 21, 2002.

=== Weekly charts ===
Chart (2002–2003)	Peak position
US Hot Country Songs (Billboard)	5
US Billboard Hot 100	40

=== Year-end charts ===
Chart (2003)	Position
US Country Songs (Billboard)	60
