= Liam Titcomb =

Canadian actor-singer

Liam Russell (formerly Titcomb)
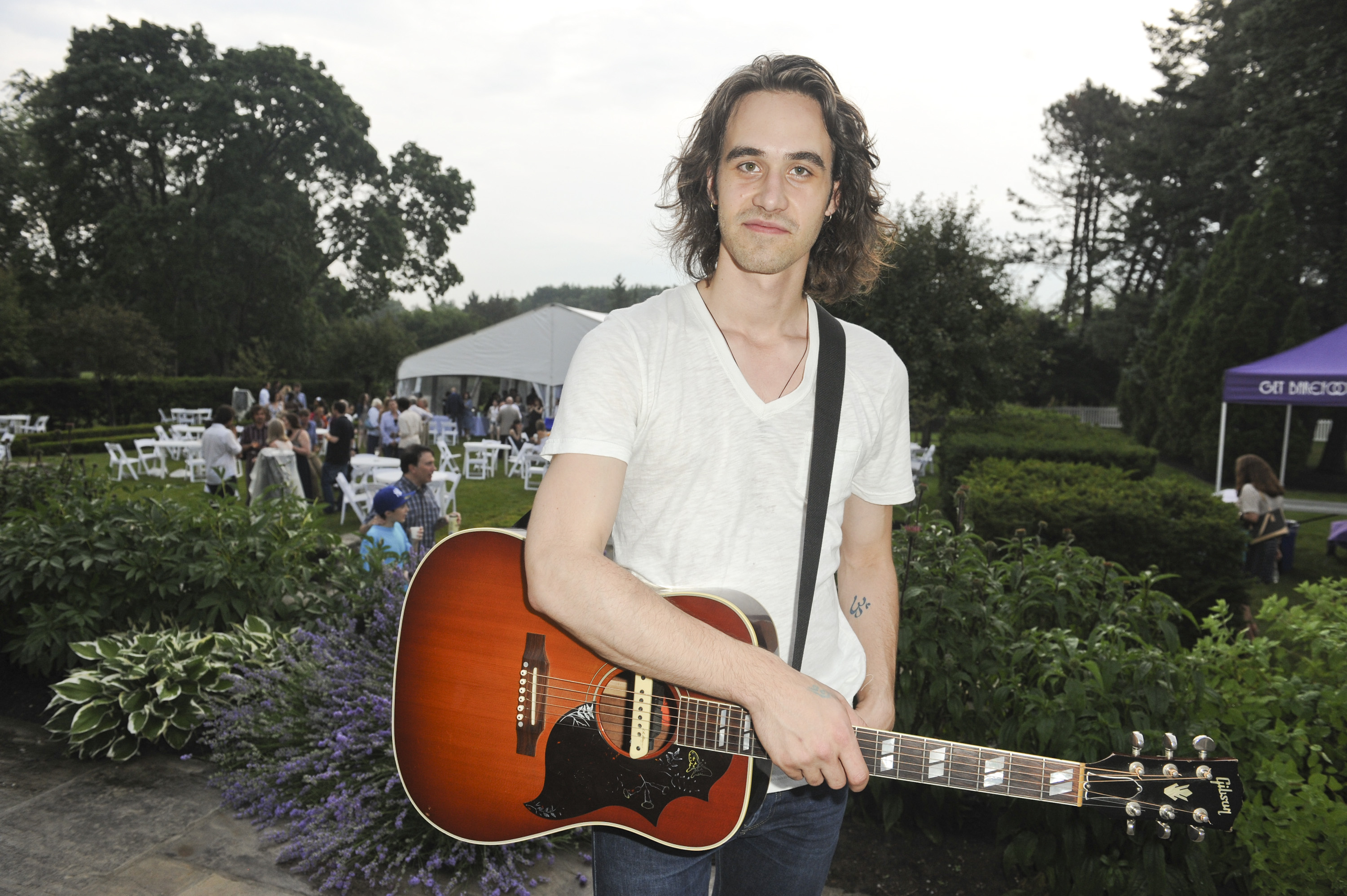
- Titcomb in 2012

Background information
- Birth name: Liam Russell-Titcomb
- Born: August 16, 1987 (age 37)
- Origin: Toronto, Ontario, Canada
- Genres: Rock; folk rock; Americana
- Instruments: Vocals; guitar; piano; bass; drums
- Years active: 2001–present
- Website: www.liamrussellmusic.com

Liam Russell (born Liam Russell-Titcomb, August 16, 1987) is a Canadian musician and actor. He released his self-titled album on Sony Music Canada in 2005. He released his second album Can't Let Go on Double Dorje Records and his 3rd Cicada on Nettwerk Music. He played the character Will in Strange Days at Blake Holsey High, and starred as Jones in the CBC Television drama Wild Roses.

== Biography ==
Raised in Toronto and Hamilton, Liam was surrounded by music throughout his childhood. His first public performance was at the age of two, when he joined his father, Brent Titcomb, on stage to play the ukulele. By the age of five, Liam joined his father at gigs as a backup singer and percussionist. At seven, he picked up the Cajun fiddle. An apprentice of Oliver Schroer, it wasn't long before Liam was playing folk festivals. By the age of twelve, he was performing on various instruments as an opening act and not soon after landed his own shows. Liam also spent several years playing steel pan with the award-winning Afropan Steelband at Toronto's Caribana festival. Today, he plays guitar, bass, piano, steel pan and drums.

In 2003, Titcomb contributed the song "War" to the benefit album Peace Songs in support of War Child Canada's humanitarian programs.

On February 1, 2005, Titcomb released his self-titled debut album, produced by Grammy winner Bill Bottrell (Sheryl Crow, Michael Jackson, Elton John, Five for Fighting). Both of the two singles from the album reached the top 20 charts on Hot AC radio, the song "Sad Eyes" reaching number 9.

At the 2004 Juno Awards, Titcomb delivered a memorable performance at the Canadian Academy of Recording Arts and Sciences (CARAS) Songwriters' Circle. In 2006, he was nominated for the 9th Annual Canadian Radio Music Awards for Best New Group or Solo Artist (Hot AC). Titcomb released his second album entitled Can't Let Go (Double Dorje Records) on June 5, 2007. Recorded in Mississauga, Ontario at Metalworks Studios and in Nashville in the fall of 2006, produced by Grammy winner Jay Joyce (Patty Griffin, The Wallflowers), the album features musical cameos by singer/songwriter Damhnait Doyle (of Shaye) and harmonica player Mickey Raphael (of Willie Nelson's band).

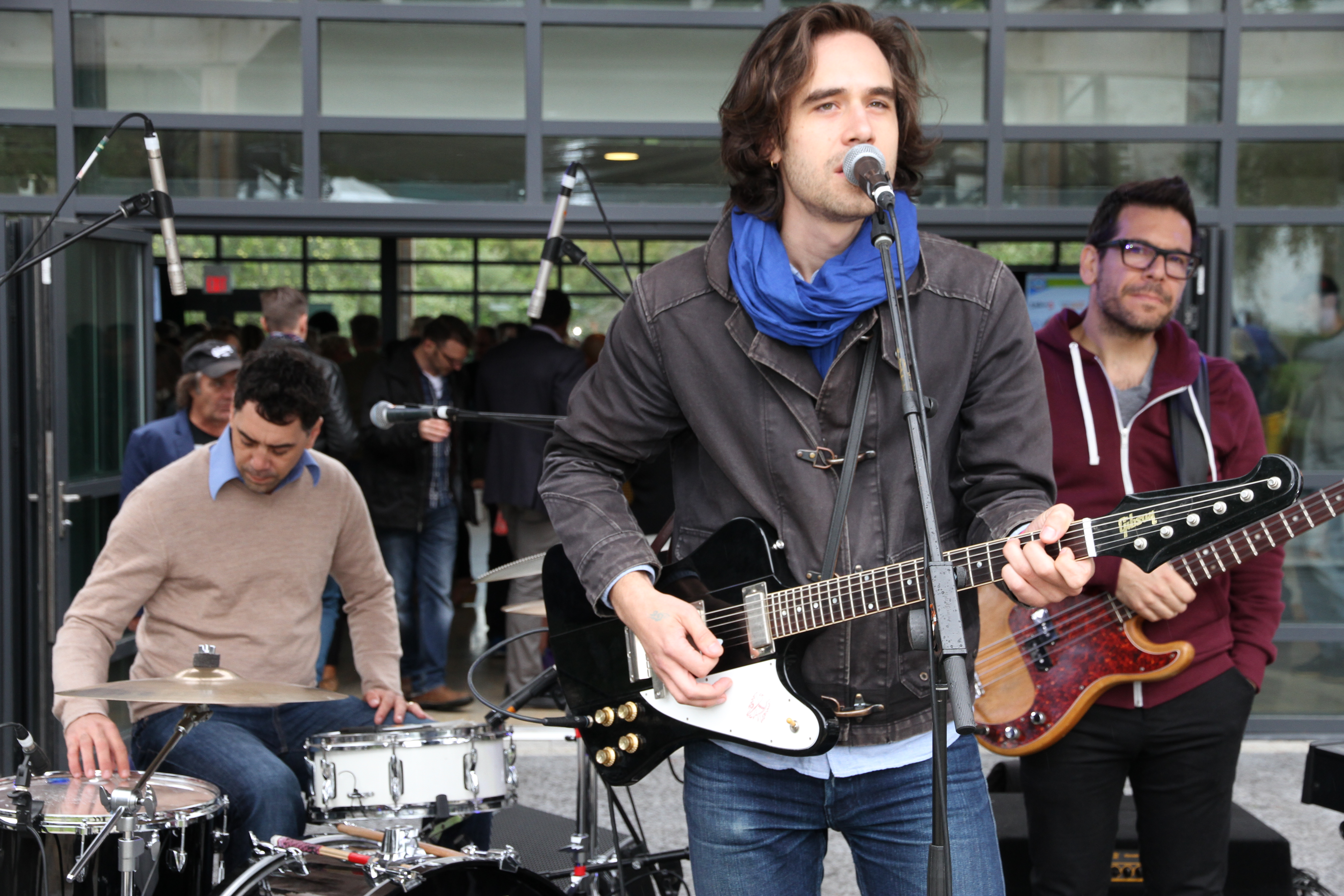
Titcomb at 2015 CFC Annual BBQ Fundraiser

== Discography ==
- Liam Titcomb (2005)
- Can't Let Go (2007)
- Cicada (2012)
