= Back When =

Single by Tim McGraw

from the album Live Like You Were Dying
- Released: August 30, 2004
- Recorded: 2004
- Genre: Country
- Length: 4:59 (album version); 4:27 (radio edit)
- Label: Curb
- Songwriters: Stan Lynch; Stephony Smith; Jeff Stevens
- Producers: Byron Gallimore; Tim McGraw; Darran Smith

Tim McGraw singles chronology
"Live Like You Were Dying" (2004)	"Back When" (2004)	"Over and Over" (2004)

"Back When" is a song written by Stan Lynch, Stephony Smith, and Jeff Stevens and recorded by American country music singer Tim McGraw. It was released in August 2004 as the second single from McGraw's 2004 album Live Like You Were Dying. The song reached number one on U.S. the Billboard Hot Country Songs chart in December 2004 and peaked at number 30 on the Billboard Hot 100.

== Content ==
"Back When" is an up-tempo song in which the narrator states how he misses the past and how the current slangs were not used for drug and sexual reference, but the objects themselves. Co-writer Stephony Smith told The Boot that she went into the kitchen to make breakfast one day and saw a snake on the floor. The snake crawled into a tight space and then she called Jeff Stevens and Stan Lynch, who he was writing with: "[Smith] said, 'Back when a hoe was a hoe, my mama woulda just chopped his head off.'"

== Critical reception ==
Kevin John Coyne, reviewing the song for Country Universe, gave it a positive rating. He stated that "Back When" is the only up-tempo song on the album that matches his ballads in quality. He also added that McGraws "vocal performance is just over-twanged enough to suggest he’s making fun of the sentimentality that he’s celebrating."

== Chart positions ==
"Back When" debuted at number 58 on the U.S. Billboard Hot Country Songs chart for the week of September 4, 2004.

Chart (2004–2005)	Peak position
Canada Country (Radio & Records)	1
US Hot Country Songs (Billboard)	1
US Billboard Hot 100	30

=== Year-end charts ===
Chart (2005)	Position
US Country Songs (Billboard)	38

== Certifications ==
Certifications for Back When
Region	Certification	Certified units/sales
United States (RIAA)	Gold	500,000^{‡}
^{‡} Sales+streaming figures based on certification alone.
