= UnAmerican =

- Origin: London, England
- Genres: Alternative rock
- Years active: 1997–2002?
- Label: Universal

UnAmerican were an English rock band based out of London. The group was fronted by former World Party member Steve McEwan.

== Biography ==
Steve McEwan played guitar in World Party, and while in the group began working with fellow member Guy Chambers on a side project. They wrote several songs together which would later be included on UnAmerican's debut album. After Chambers left to work with Robbie Williams, McEwan recruited Matthew Crozer from a London band called Ugli, and Peter Clarke and Tim Bye from a group called Bugs. The group were signed by Estupendo Records, a Universal subsidiary, after only a few live shows. Their debut self-titled record was released early in 2000. Following the release of the album, the group toured the United States with The Who.

The group worked on a second album, but it was never released.

== Members ==
- Steve McEwan – vocals
- Peter Clarke – bass
- Matthew Crozer – guitar
- Tim Bye – drums
