= Watch the Wind Blow By =

Single by Tim McGraw

from the album Tim McGraw and the Dancehall Doctors
- Released: October 27, 2003
- Recorded: 2002
- Genre: Country
- Length: 4:36
- Label: Curb
- Songwriters: Anders Osborne; Dylan Altman
- Producers: Byron Gallimore; Tim McGraw; Darran Smith

Tim McGraw singles chronology
"Real Good Man" (2003)	"Watch the Wind Blow By" (2003)	"Live Like You Were Dying" (2004)

"Watch the Wind Blow By" is a song written by Anders Osborne and Dylan Altman, and recorded by American country music singer Tim McGraw. It was released in October 2003 as the fifth and final single from McGraw's 2002 album Tim McGraw and the Dancehall Doctors. The song reached number one on the US Billboard Hot Country Singles & Tracks (now Hot Country Songs) for the week of March 20, 2004. It also peaked at number 32 on the Billboard Hot 100.

== Content ==
The narrator states that all he wants to do is relax with his lover and "watch the wind blow by."

== Chart positions ==
"Watch the Wind Blow By" debuted at number 48 on the U.S. Billboard Hot Country Singles & Tracks for the chart week of November 1, 2003.

Chart (2003–2004)	Peak position
US Hot Country Songs (Billboard)	1
US Billboard Hot 100	32

=== Year-end charts ===
Chart (2004)	Position
US Country Songs (Billboard)	9
