= Rhythm Pals =

Canadian music television series

- Genre: Country/Western music
- Starring: The Rhythm Pals – Mike Ferbey, Marc Wald, and Jack Jensen
- Country of origin: Canada
- Original language: English
- No. of seasons: 1

Production
- Production locations: Vancouver, British Columbia, Canada
- Running time: 20 minutes

Original release
- Network: CBC Television
- Release: 16 April – 20 August 1956

Rhythm Pals is a Canadian music television program that aired on CBC Television in 1956.

== Premise ==
This Vancouver-produced program featured The Rhythm Pals, a Country/Western vocal/instrumental group formed in 1946 by Mike Ferbey, Marc Wald, and Jack Jensen. They were later known for their regular appearances on The Tommy Hunter Show which aired over the CBC television network from Toronto on Friday evenings.

== Scheduling ==
This program occupied a 20-minute time slot on Mondays at 7:40 p.m. (Eastern time) from 16 April to 20 August 1956. This unusual start time allowed for the 10-minute The Nation's Business political telecasts at 7:30 p.m.
