= Melobar guitar =

The Melobar Guitar was invented by Walt Smith. Patented in the late 1960s, it was a combination of a steel guitar and a standard guitar using a standard guitar body and twisting the neck of the guitar up at a 45-degree angle so a player could play over the top of the neck in the traditional steel guitar method.

== Origins ==
Tuned to open Chords, Smith endeavored to bring steel guitar up to the level of his classical piano teaching and purchased the first mechanical pitch changing patent but was cheated out of the design the next year. Giving up on mechanical devices he then spent the rest of his life trying to accomplish a tuning that would give a player the ability to do major/9ths/7ths/4ths/6ths and minor chords with a flat pick. His intent was to make it easier for beginners to play guitar without the difficult left hand manipulations but the idea did not catch on.

Professionals, however, such as Rusty Young with Poco, David Lindley, Arlen Roth, Steve Fishel, Roy Clark, Troy Klontz with Brooks and Dunn, Jeff Peterson with Clint Black, Howard Leesea of Heart, Brian Jones with the early Rolling Stones (later Rolling Stones videos as well), Patrick Arbuthnot of British country rockers The Rockingbirds, Jimmy Page and many many others used the Melobar as an open tuning lead instrument putting it on stage for the last thirty years.

Walt had five sons; four of whom were involved in the business. John Selby Smith who was able to get Melobars built for Walt by Semi Mosley of Mosrite some early exposure with Pat Boone and Rusty Young, Steven Sherman Smith who was involved with the Rosac and Metal body models, Doug Smith a player and musician. Ted Smith the fifth son took over Melobar at Walt's death and started Smith Family Music taking the Melobar concept back to its roots with Lap Steel Guitars and the Melobro (Resonator Dobro type instrument made of fiberglass with internal wood baffles). Walt's grandson Marc Smith worked with Ted in construction for several years taking the company to the third generation.

== Decline ==
Ted managed the company for 12 years before retiring to follow other interest and Black Canyon Guitars tried to continue the building but full production was never reached again.

== Media coverage ==
The Melobar Company history is available in books by Tom Wheeler American Guitars and several national guitar magazine articles The Melobar Story March Guitar Player magazine and a tribute at the time of Walt's death Melobar's Basement Genius Guitar Player Magazine Sept. 1991 and the book Lap Steel Guitars.
