= Live Like You Were Dying (song) =

Single by Tim McGraw

from the album Live Like You Were Dying
- B-side: "Just Be Your Tear"
- Released: June 7, 2004
- Recorded: January 2004
- Genre: Country
- Length: 4:58 (album version); 4:28 (AC mix); 4:13 (radio edit)
- Label: Curb
- Songwriters: Tim Nichols; Craig Wiseman
- Producers: Byron Gallimore; Tim McGraw; Darran Smith

Tim McGraw singles chronology
"Watch the Wind Blow By" (2003)	"Live Like You Were Dying" (2004)	"Back When" (2004)

"Live Like You Were Dying" is a song recorded by American country music singer Tim McGraw, and was the lead single from his eighth album of the same name (2004). It was written by the songwriting team of Tim Nichols and Craig Wiseman. The duo crafted the song based on family and friends who learned of illnesses (cancers), and how they often had a new perspective on life upon learning that they had limited time remaining. They decided to write a song based on the concept, hoping that it might inspire someone in such a situation. The song's lyrics center on experiencing life to its fullest, while also becoming a better person.

Released in June 2004 as the lead single from the album, the song became an enormous success in the U.S. It spent seven weeks atop of the Billboard country music charts; the magazine later ranked it the biggest country song of the year. "Live Like You Were Dying" won several awards, including Single of the Year and Song of the Year at the 2004 Country Music Association Awards and at the 2004 Academy of Country Music Awards and the 2004 Grammy Award for Best Country Song. The music video, directed by Sherman Halsey, was nominated for Video of the Year at the 2004 Academy of Country Music Awards. It has sold over two million copies in the U.S.

== Content ==
"Live Like You Were Dying" tells the story of a man in his early forties who gets the news that he has a life-threatening illness. He experiences a profound shift in perspective on what is most important in life.

This song is often associated with McGraw's father, Tug McGraw, who was hospitalized with a brain tumor on March 12, 2003. It was revealed that he had cancer. He died on January 5, 2004.

== Background ==
The song was written by Tim Nichols and Craig Wiseman. The duo had a friend who received a medical misdiagnosis regarding a form of lung cancer. Wiseman and Nichols began discussing family members and friends who learned of illnesses, and how they often had a new perspective on life upon learning that they had limited time remaining. They decided to write a song based on the concept, hoping that it might inspire someone in such a situation. After they came up with the title, they began writing the first verse and chorus. They found themselves attached to the song, and continued to write it late into the night over the phone. "I remember going in my totally dark living room, laying on the floor, and we wrote the second verse on the phone," Wiseman recalled. The inclusion of the lyric about riding a bull was intended as a sort of "palette cleanse," as they felt the chorus was growing too sentimental. The duo judged its creation as a "really spiritual thing, because it came strong. Me and Tim's instincts and intuitions just kept leading us."

The song was demoed within a few days of its writing by Wiseman, and was chosen by McGraw to be his next lead single. Wiseman remembered the song had personal significance for McGraw, who commented that he himself had gone fishing with his father prior to a quadruple bypass surgery.

== Commercial performance ==
"Live Like You Were Dying" debuted at number 36 on the U.S. Billboard Hot Country Singles & Tracks for the chart week of June 5, 2004. It reached No. 1 on the chart dated July 17, 2004, the song's seventh week on the chart. It spent three weeks at the top before being replaced by Reba McEntire's "Somebody" on the chart dated August 7. The following week, "Live Like You Were Dying" returned to number one for four additional weeks until it was dethroned by Terri Clark's "Girls Lie Too" on September 11. It ultimately spent seven non-consecutive weeks at number one over two separate runs. The song was certified five-times Platinum by the RIAA on October 10, 2024, and it has sold 2,313,000 copies in the US as of July 2016.

== Music video ==
The video starts with McGraw barefoot and looking at his toes. The video also features McGraw singing in an infinity cove with video clips added by CGI. The alternate version of the video, directed and produced by Sherman Halsey, McGraw's usual director of choice, ends with a clip of McGraw's father, the late Tug McGraw, pitching the final strike for the 1980 World Champion Philadelphia Phillies, which, at the time, was the team's only World Series Championship. The video was nominated for Video of the Year at the 2006 Academy of Country Music Awards.

== Charts ==
=== Weekly chart ===
Chart (2004–2005)	Peak position
Canada AC (Radio & Records)	13
Canada Country (Radio & Records)	1
US Billboard Hot 100	29
US Hot Country Songs (Billboard)	1
US Adult Contemporary (Billboard)	4
US Pop Airplay (Billboard)	37
US Adult Pop Airplay (Billboard)	21

=== Year-end charts ===
Chart (2004)	Position
US Country Songs (Billboard)	1
US Billboard Hot 100	81

Chart (2005)	Position
US Adult Contemporary (Billboard)	6

=== Certifications ===
Region	Certification	Certified units/sales
United States (RIAA)	5× Platinum	2,313,000
