= Number One Hits (Tim McGraw album) =

Greatest hits album by Tim McGraw
- Released: November 30, 2010
- Genre: Country
- Length: 97:59
- Label: Curb
- Producer: Various original producers

Tim McGraw chronology
Southern Voice (2009)	Number One Hits (2010)	Emotional Traffic (2012)

Singles from Number One Hits
- 1. "Felt Good on My Lips" Released: September 20, 2010

Professional ratings
Review scores
Source	Rating
Allmusic	4/5 stars
Rolling Stone	3.5/5 stars

Number One Hits is the fourth compilation album by American country music artist Tim McGraw. It was released in the United States on November 30, 2010, by Curb Records. The album's new song, "Felt Good on My Lips", was released as the album's lead single, and has since become another number one hit. According to the chart dated November 30, 2011, the album has sold 484,000 copies in the US.

As a bonus track, this album also includes the dance mix of McGraw's first top 10 hit "Indian Outlaw".

== Track listing ==
CD 1
No.	Title	Writer(s)	Length
1.	"Live Like You Were Dying"	Craig Wiseman, Tim Nichols	4:58
2.	"Don't Take the Girl"	Craig Martin, Larry W. Johnson	4:11
3.	"It's Your Love" (duet with Faith Hill)	Stephony Smith	3:45
4.	"Just to See You Smile"	Mark Nesler, Tony Martin	3:33
5.	"Something Like That"	Rick Ferrell, Keith Follesé	3:01
6.	"My Next Thirty Years"	Phil Vassar	3:37
7.	"The Cowboy in Me"	Al Anderson, Craig Wiseman, Jeffrey Steele	4:05
8.	"She Never Lets It Go to Her Heart"	Chris Waters, Tom Shapiro	3:06
9.	"I Like It, I Love It"	Mark Hall, Jeb Stuart Anderson, Steve Dukes	3:24
10.	"Watch the Wind Blow By"	Anders Osborne, Dylan Altman	4:36
11.	"Please Remember Me"	Rodney Crowell, Will Jennings	4:55
12.	"Real Good Man"	George Teren, Rivers Rutherford	4:16

CD 2
No.	Title	Writer(s)	Length
1.	"Southern Voice"	Bob DiPiero, Tom Douglas	4:02
2.	"My Best Friend"	Bill Luther, Aimee Mayo	4:40
3.	"Everywhere"	Mike Reid, Wiseman	4:51
4.	"Grown Men Don't Cry"	Douglas, Steve Seskin	3:56
5.	"Back When"	Jeff Stevens, Stan Lynch, Stephony Smith	4:59
6.	"Angry All the Time"	Bruce Robison	4:30
7.	"Last Dollar (Fly Away)"	Big Kenny	4:30
8.	"Unbroken"	Annie Roboff, Holly Lamar	4:01
9.	"Where the Green Grass Grows"	Jess Leary, Wiseman	3:22
10.	"Not a Moment Too Soon"	Wayne Perry, Joe Barnhill	3:44
11.	"Indian Outlaw" (Dance Mix)	Tommy Barnes, Jumpin' Gene Simmons, John D. Loudermilk	4:20
12.	"Felt Good on My Lips"	Brett Beavers, Jim Beavers, Brett Warren, Brad Warren	4:37

== Charts ==
=== Weekly charts ===
Chart (2010)	Peak position
Australian Albums (ARIA)	76
Australian Country Albums (ARIA)	5
UK Country Albums (OCC)	1
US Billboard 200	27
US Top Country Albums (Billboard)	6
Chart (2016)	Peak position
Canadian Albums (Billboard)	99

=== Year-end charts ===
Chart (2011)	Position
US Billboard 200	60
US Top Country Albums (Billboard)	13
Chart (2012)	Position
US Billboard 200	184
US Top Country Albums (Billboard)	38
Chart (2017)	Position
US Top Country Albums (Billboard)	45
Chart (2018)	Position
US Top Country Albums (Billboard)	37
Chart (2019)	Position
US Top Country Albums (Billboard)	27
Chart (2020)	Position
US Top Country Albums (Billboard)	32
Chart (2021)	Position
US Billboard 200	181
US Top Country Albums (Billboard)	17
Chart (2022)	Position
US Billboard 200	190
US Top Country Albums (Billboard)	16
Chart (2023)	Position
US Top Country Albums (Billboard)	28
Chart (2024)	Position
US Top Country Albums (Billboard)	32
Chart (2025)	Position
US Top Country Albums (Billboard)	38

== Certifications ==
Region	Certification	Certified units/sales
United States (RIAA)	2× Platinum	2,000,000^{‡}
^{‡} Sales+streaming figures based on certification alone.
