= 30th Academy of Country Music Awards =

US music awards ceremony in 1995

- Date: May 10, 1995
- Location: Universal Amphitheatre, Los Angeles, California
- Hosted by: Clint Black; Tanya Tucker; Jeff Foxworthy

Highlights
- Most wins: Reba McEntire; Tim McGraw; John Michael Montgomery; The Mavericks; Garth Brooks (2 each)
- Most nominations: Alan Jackson (6)

Television/radio coverage
- Network: NBC

The 30th Academy of Country Music Awards was held on May 10, 1995, at the Universal Amphitheatre, in Los Angeles, California. The ceremony was hosted by Clint Black, Tanya Tucker and Jeff Foxworthy.

== Winners and nominees ==
Winners are shown in bold.

Entertainer of the Year	Album of the Year
**Reba McEntire**; Alabama; Brooks & Dunn; Garth Brooks; Alan Jackson	**Not a Moment Too Soon — Tim McGraw**; In Pieces — Garth Brooks; Stones in the Road — Mary Chapin Carpenter; When Love Finds You — Vince Gill; Who I Am — Alan Jackson
Top Female Vocalist of the Year	Top Male Vocalist of the Year
**Reba McEntire**; Mary Chapin Carpenter; Faith Hill; Patty Loveless; Pam Tillis	**Alan Jackson**; Garth Brooks; Joe Diffie; Vince Gill; George Strait
Top Vocal Group of the Year	Top Vocal Duo of the Year
**The Mavericks**; Alabama; Diamond Rio; Little Texas; Sawyer Brown	**Brooks & Dunn**; John Anderson and Tracy Lawrence; George Jones and Alan Jackson; Conway Twitty and Sam Moore; Trisha Yearwood and Aaron Neville
Single Record of the Year	Song of the Year
**"I Swear"** — **John Michael Montgomery**; "Don't Take the Girl" — Tim McGraw; "Livin' on Love" — Alan Jackson; "Third Rock from the Sun" — Joe Diffie; "Tryin' to Get Over You" — Vince Gill	**"I Swear"** — **Frank J. Myers, Gary Baker**; "Don't Take the Girl" — Craig Martin, Larry W. Johnson; "How Can I Help You Say Goodbye" — Karen Taylor-Good, Burton Banks Collins; "Livin' on Love" — Alan Jackson; "When Love Finds You" — Vince Gill, Michael Omartian
Top New Male Vocalist	Top New Female Vocalist
**Tim McGraw**; David Ball; John Berry	**Chely Wright**; Lisa Brokop; Victoria Shaw
Top New Vocal Duo or Group	Video of the Year
**The Mavericks**; The Tractors; John & Audrey Wiggins	**"The Red Strokes"** — **Garth Brooks**; "How Can I Help You Say Goodbye" — Patty Loveless; "Independence Day" — Martina McBride; "Standing Outside the Fire" — Garth Brooks; "This Time" — Sawyer Brown
Pioneer Award
**Loretta Lynn**
Jim Reeves Memorial Award
**Garth Brooks**

== Performers ==
Performer(s)	Song(s)
Vince Gill; The Tractors	"The House Is Rockin'"
Faith Hill; Joe Diffie; Michelle Wright; Shelby Lynne; Collin Raye; Little Texas	Country Hits Medley "Don't Rock the Jukebox" "Okie from Muskogee" "Eighteen Wheels and a Dozen Roses" "Easy Loving" "Behind Closed Doors" "All the Gold in California" "He Stopped Loving Her Today" "Always on My Mind" "Forever and Ever, Amen" "Friends in Low Places" "For the Good Times" "Tulsa Time" "Take Me Home, Country Roads"
Pam Tillis	"In Between Dances"
John Berry; David Ball; Tim McGraw	Top New Male Vocalist Medley "Standing on the Edge of Goodbye" "Thinkin' Problem" "Refried Dreams"
Brooks & Dunn	"Little Miss Honky Tonk"
Alan Jackson	"Livin' on Love"
Clint Black	"Summer's Comin'"
Garth Brooks	Garth's Heroes Medley "Unwound" "Mama Tried" "Gentle on My Mind" "Whispering Pines" "Act Naturally" "White Lightning"
Reba McEntire	"And Still"
Tanya Tucker	"Find Out What's Happening"
Lisa Brokop; Chely Wright; Victoria Shaw	Top New Female Vocalist Medley "One of Those Nights" "Sea of Cowboy Hats" "Forgiveness"
Barbara Mandrell	"In Times Like These"
John Anderson; Tracy Lawrence	"Hillbilly with a Heartache"
John & Audrey Wiggins; The Tractors	Top New Vocal Duo or Group Medley "Has Anybody Seen Amy" "Baby Likes to Rock It"
Jeff Foxworthy	Comedy Performance: "You Might Be a Redneck"
Willie Nelson	"End of Understanding"
Alabama; The International Children's Choir	"Angels Among Us"

== Presenters ==
Presenter(s)	Notes
Aaron Tippin; Cybill Shepherd; Doug Supernaw	Single Record of the Year
John Michael Montgomery; Kay Adams	Top New Male Vocalist
Sawyer Brown; Bonnie Owens	Top Female Vocalist of the Year
Heather Whitestone; Joe Diffie	Top Vocal Group of the Year
Mac Davis; Jane Seymour	Song of the Year
Linda Davis; Toby Keith; Holly Dunn	Top New Female Vocalist
Tom Wopat; Kathy Mattea	Top Vocal Duo of the Year
Leeza Gibbons	Presented Cliffie Stone Pioneer Award to Loretta Lynn
Trisha Yearwood; Don Edwards; Waddie Mitchell	Video of the Year
Martina McBride; Diamond Rio	Top New Vocal Duo or Group
Lorianne Crook; Charlie Chase; Ray Benson	Album of the Year
Jay Leno	Presents Jim Reeves Memorial Award to Garth Brooks
Buck Owens; Dyan Cannon	Top Male Vocalist of the Year
Ashley Judd; Naomi Judd	Entertainer of the Year
