= All I Want (Tim McGraw album) =

Studio album by Tim McGraw
- Released: September 19, 1995
- Recorded: 1995
- Genre: Neotraditional country
- Length: 42:12
- Label: Curb
- Producers: Byron Gallimore; James Stroud

Tim McGraw chronology
Not a Moment Too Soon (1994)	All I Want (1995)	Everywhere (1997)

Singles from All I Want
- 1. "I Like It, I Love It" Released: July 31, 1995; 2. "Can't Be Really Gone" Released: October 23, 1995; 3. "All I Want Is a Life" Released: January 15, 1996; 4. "She Never Lets It Go to Her Heart" Released: June 17, 1996; 5. "Maybe We Should Just Sleep on It" Released: October 7, 1996

Professional ratings
Review scores
Source	Rating
Allmusic	3.5/5 stars
Entertainment Weekly	A

All I Want is the third studio album by American country music artist Tim McGraw. It was released on September 19, 1995. The album sold over two million copies and reached the top 5 on the Billboard 200. It has been certified triple-Platinum by the RIAA. The album's singles were, in order of release: "I Like It, I Love It", "Can't Be Really Gone", "All I Want Is a Life", "She Never Lets It Go to Her Heart" and "Maybe We Should Just Sleep on It". Respectively, these reached No. 1, No. 2, No. 5, No. 1, and No. 4 on the Billboard Hot Country Songs charts. "I Like It, I Love It" was also a No. 25 hit on the Billboard Hot 100. This was Tim's last album to have a neotraditional country sound before developing a more crossover-friendly country-pop sound.

== Track listing ==
No.	Title	Writer(s)	Length
1.	"All I Want Is a Life"	Stan Munsey, Tony Mullins, Don Pfrimmer	3:33
2.	"She Never Lets It Go to Her Heart"	Chris Waters, Tom Shapiro	3:02
3.	"Can't Be Really Gone"	Gary Burr	3:21
4.	"Maybe We Should Just Sleep on It"	Jerry Laseter, Kerry Kurt Phillips	3:55
5.	"I Didn't Ask and She Didn't Say"	Van Stephenson, Reese Wilson, Tony Martin	4:02
6.	"Renegade"	Jeff Stevens, Steve Bogard	2:59
7.	"I Like It, I Love It"	Mark Hall, Jeb Stuart Anderson, Steve Dukes	3:24
8.	"The Great Divide"	Brett Beavers	3:15
9.	"You Got the Wrong Man"	Joe Barnhill, Wayne Perry	3:18
10.	"Don't Mention Memphis"	Bill LaBounty, Rand Bishop	3:00
11.	"When She Wakes Up (And Finds Me Gone)"	Tommy Barnes	5:13
12.	"That's Just Me"	Deryl Dodd	3:13
Total length:			42:12

== Charts and certifications ==
=== Weekly charts ===
Chart (1995)	Peak position
Canada Top Albums/CDs (RPM)	58
Canada Country Albums/CDs (RPM)	1
US Billboard 200	4
US Top Country Albums (Billboard)	1

=== Singles ===
Year	Single	Peak chart positions		
Year	Single	US Country	US	CAN Country
1995	"I Like It, I Love It"	1	25	1
1995	"Can't Be Really Gone"	2	87	4
1995	"All I Want Is a Life"	5	—	2
1996	"She Never Lets It Go to Her Heart"	1	—	5
1996	"Maybe We Should Just Sleep on It"	4	—	1

=== Year-end charts ===
Chart (1995)	Position
US Billboard 200	101
US Top Country Albums (Billboard)	17
Chart (1996)	Position
US Billboard 200	38
US Top Country Albums (Billboard)	6
Chart (1997)	Position
US Top Country Albums (Billboard)	44

=== Certifications ===
Region	Certification	Certified units/sales
Canada (Music Canada)	Platinum	100,000^{^}
United States (RIAA)	3× Platinum	3,000,000^{^}
^{^} Shipments figures based on certification alone.

== Personnel ==
- Mike Brignardello – bass
- Larry Byrom – acoustic guitar
- Steve Dorff – string arrangements and conductor
- Glen Duncan – fiddle
- Sonny Garrish – dobro, pedal steel guitar
- Dann Huff – electric guitar
- Tim McGraw – lead vocals
- Terry McMillan – percussion
- Steve Nathan – keyboards, Hammond B3 organ
- Matt Rollings – piano, keyboards, Hammond B3 organ
- Brent Rowan – electric guitar
- Lonnie Wilson – drums
- Glenn Worf – bass on "All I Want is a Life"
- Curtis Wright – backing vocals
- Curtis Young – backing vocals
- Nashville String Machine – string section

== Production ==
- Byron Gallimore – producer
- James Stroud – producer
- Missi Callis – production assistant
- Abbe Nameche – production assistant
- Stephanie Orr – production assistant
- Tamera Petrash – production assistant
- Doug Rich – production assistant

=== Technical ===
- Julian King – recording
- Chris Lord-Alge – mixing
- Ricky Cobble – additional engineer, assistant engineer, recording assistant
- Jerry Puckett – additional engineer
- Mark Hagen – recording assistant, mix assistant
- Craig White – recording assistant
- Doug Sax – mastering
