= Southern Voice =

Southern Voice may refer to:

- Southern Voice (newspaper), an American LGBT newspaper
- Southern Voice (album), an album by Tim McGraw

- "Southern Voice" (song), its title track
