= Everywhere (Tim McGraw album) =

Studio album by Tim McGraw
- Released: June 3, 1997
- Recorded: 1997
- Genres: Country pop; country rock
- Length: 40:42
- Label: Curb
- Producers: Byron Gallimore; Tim McGraw; James Stroud

Tim McGraw chronology
All I Want (1995)	Everywhere (1997)	A Place in the Sun (1999)

Singles from Everywhere
- 1. "It's Your Love" Released: May 12, 1997; 2. "Everywhere" Released: July 7, 1997; 3. "Just to See You Smile" Released: August 9, 1997; 4. "One of These Days" Released: March 9, 1998; 5. "Where the Green Grass Grows" Released: July 13, 1998; 6. "For a Little While" Released: November 3, 1998

Professional ratings
Review scores
Source	Rating
Allmusic	2.5/5 stars
Entertainment Weekly	B
Los Angeles Times	2/4 stars

Everywhere is the fourth studio album of American country music artist Tim McGraw. It was released on June 3, 1997. It was his first release since his marriage to Faith Hill. Their collaboration on this album, "It's Your Love", was nominated for Best Country Collaboration With Vocals and Best Country Song at the 1998 Grammy Awards. This was Tim's first album to have a crossover-friendly country-pop sound, which was a departure from his earlier neotraditional country albums.

Singles released from this album include the number one Hot Country Songs hits "It's Your Love", "Everywhere", "Just to See You Smile" and "Where the Green Grass Grows", as well as the #2-peaking "One of These Days" (originally recorded by Marcus Hummon on his 1995 album All in Good Time) and "For a Little While". Both "It's Your Love" and "Just to See You Smile" were declared as number one country hits of the year by Billboard, for 1997 and 1998 respectively. "You Turn Me On" also entered the lower regions of the country charts from unsolicited airplay.

"You Just Get Better All the Time" was previously recorded by Tony Joe White on his 1983 album "Dangerous" and by James House on his 1990 album Hard Times for an Honest Man. "You Turn Me On" was later recorded as "Dumaflache" by Daryle Singletary on his compilation album "Now and Again".

== Track listing ==
No.	Title	Writer(s)	Length
1.	"Where the Green Grass Grows"	Jess Leary, Craig Wiseman	3:21
2.	"For a Little While"	Steve Mandile, Jerry Vandiver, Phil Vassar	3:33
3.	"It's Your Love" (duet with Faith Hill)	Stephony Smith	3:47
4.	"Ain't That the Way It Always Ends"	Skip Ewing, Don Sampson	2:47
5.	"I Do but I Don't"	Mark Nesler, Tony Martin	3:28
6.	"One of These Days"	Marcus Hummon, Monty Powell, Kip Raines	4:41
7.	"Hard on the Ticker"	Wiseman, Gary Loyd	3:40
8.	"Everywhere"	Mike Reid, Wiseman	4:50
9.	"Just to See You Smile"	Nesler, Martin	3:35
10.	"You Just Get Better All the Time"	Tony Joe White, Johnny Christopher	3:21
11.	"You Turn Me On"	Billy Lawson	3:41
Total length:			40:42

== Personnel ==
=== Musicians ===
- Tim McGraw – lead vocals
- Steve Nathan – acoustic piano, keyboards
- Matt Rollings – acoustic piano
- Larry Byrom – acoustic guitar
- J. T. Corenflos – acoustic guitar
- B. James Lowry – acoustic guitar
- Biff Watson – acoustic guitar
- Dann Huff – electric guitar
- Michael Landau – electric guitar
- Brent Rowan – electric guitar
- Pat Buchanan – electric guitar (11)
- Paul Franklin – steel guitar
- Sonny Garrish – steel guitar
- Mark Casstevens – banjo (9)
- Mike Brignardello – bass
- Lonnie Wilson – drums
- Glen Duncan – fiddle
- Stuart Duncan – fiddle
- Bob Mason – cello (6)
- Curtis Wright – backing vocals
- Curtis Young – backing vocals
- Faith Hill – backing vocals (3)
- Timothy B. Schmit – backing vocals (8)

=== Production ===
- Byron Gallimore – producer
- Tim McGraw – producer, creative director
- James Stroud – producer
- Chris Lord-Alge – recording, mixing
- Dennis Davis – additional recording
- Julian King – additional recording
- Ricky Cobble – recording assistant
- Tony Green – recording assistant
- Rich Hanson – recording assistant
- Terri Wong – vocal recording of Timothy B. Schmit (8)
- Missi Callis – song assistant (8)
- Michelle Metzger – song assistant (8)
- Doug Sax – mastering
- Kelly Wright – creative director
- Glenn Sweitzer – art direction, design
- Russ Harrington – photography

== Chart performance ==
=== Weekly charts ===
Chart (1997)	Peak position
Australian Albums (ARIA)	40
Canada Top Albums/CDs (RPM)	8
Canada Country Albums/CDs (RPM)	1
US Billboard 200	2
US Top Country Albums (Billboard)	1

=== Year-end charts ===
Chart (1997)	Position
US Billboard 200	28
US Top Country Albums (Billboard)	5
Chart (1998)	Position
US Billboard 200	51
US Top Country Albums (Billboard)	6
Chart (1999)	Position
US Billboard 200	189
US Top Country Albums (Billboard)	17

=== Singles ===
Year	Single	Peak chart positions		
Year	Single	US Country	US	CAN Country
1997	"It's Your Love" (with Faith Hill)	1	7	1
1997	"Everywhere"	1	—	2
1997	"Just to See You Smile"	1	—	1
1998	"One of These Days"	2	74	1
1998	"Where the Green Grass Grows"	1	79	1
1998	"For a Little While"	2	37	1

== Certifications ==
Region	Certification	Certified units/sales
Canada (Music Canada)	2× Platinum	200,000^{^}
United States (RIAA)	5× Platinum	5,000,000^{‡}
^{^} Shipments figures based on certification alone.^{‡} Sales+streaming figures based on certification alone.
