= Down on the Farm (Tim McGraw song) =

Single by Tim McGraw

from the album Not a Moment Too Soon
- Released: July 11, 1994
- Recorded: 1994
- Genre: Country
- Length: 2:55
- Label: Curb
- Songwriters: Jerry Laseter; Kerry Kurt Phillips
- Producers: Byron Gallimore; James Stroud

Tim McGraw singles chronology
"Don't Take the Girl" (1994)	"Down on the Farm" (1994)	"Not a Moment Too Soon" (1994)

"Down on the Farm" is a song written by Jerry Laseter and Kerry Kurt Phillips and recorded by American country music artist Tim McGraw. It was released in July 1994 as the third single from McGraw's 1994 album Not a Moment Too Soon. The song peaked at number 2 on the US Billboard Hot Country Singles & Tracks chart.

== Critical reception ==
Billboard Magazine called the song a "backwoods party song."

== Music video ==
The music video takes place in Tim McGraw's home state of Louisiana. It features him singing to a crowd. It was directed by his usual director of choice Sherman Halsey, who directed almost all of his music videos.

== Chart positions ==
"Down on the Farm" debuted at number 67 on the U.S. Billboard Hot Country Singles & Tracks for the week of July 16, 1994.

Chart (1994)	Peak position
Canada Country Singles (RPM)	3
US Hot Country Songs (Billboard)	2

=== Year-end charts ===
Chart (1994)	Position
Canada Country Tracks (RPM)	44
US Country Songs (Billboard)	5

== Certifications ==
Certifications for Down On The Farm
Region	Certification	Certified units/sales
United States (RIAA)	Gold	500,000^{‡}
^{‡} Sales+streaming figures based on certification alone.
