= Felt Good on My Lips =

Single by Tim McGraw

from the album Number One Hits and Emotional Traffic
- Released: September 20, 2010
- Genre: Country
- Length: 4:37 (album version); 4:04 (live video version); 3:58 (radio edit)
- Label: Curb
- Songwriters: Brett Beavers; Jim Beavers; Brad Warren, Brett Warren
- Producers: Byron Gallimore; Tim McGraw

Tim McGraw singles chronology
"Still" (2010)	"Felt Good on My Lips" (2010)	"Me and Tennessee" (2011)

"Felt Good on My Lips" is a song written by Brett Beavers, Jim Beavers, Brett Warren and Brad Warren, and was recorded by American country music singer Tim McGraw. It was released in September 2010 as the first single from his compilation album Number One Hits, and has since become McGraw's 24th Number One hit on Billboard's Hot Country Songs chart. The song is also included on his 2012 release Emotional Traffic.

== Background and writing ==
Songwriter Brett Beavers wrote "Felt Good on My Lips" with his brother, Jim Beavers, as well as Brett Warren and Brad Warren (also known as The Warren Brothers). In an interview with The Boot, Jim said that Brett provided the idea of writing with The Warren Brothers, and Brett Warren based the song around a bass guitar riff that Jim played.

== Critical reception ==
Stephen M. Deusner of Engine 145 gave the song a thumbs-down. He thought that the verses were well written and said that McGraw "ably conveys the excitement of attraction" on them, but criticized the chorus. Matt Bjorke of Roughstock gave it three and a half stars and thought that the chorus is "catchy with repeatable lyrics and a progressive melody." Bjorke calls it one of McGraw's best single in the last couple of years. Kevin John Coyne of Country Universe gave it a C−, saying that "the production sank this record before the song had any chance to win me over. The whole thing has the vibe of a long-lost demo being spruced up for a posthumous cash-in." Coyne also states that McGraw's voice is so processed it is difficult to tell it is him singing.

== Release ==
"Felt Good on My Lips" was released to radio in September 2010. It is included on a compilation album titled Number One Hits, which comprises all of McGraw's number-one singles as well as "Felt Good on My Lips" and a remix of "Indian Outlaw".

== Chart performance ==
The song debuted at number 33 on the Hot Country Songs charts for the week ending October 9, 2010. It is the second-highest debuting single of his career, behind only "Grown Men Don't Cry", which entered the same chart at number 30. It reached Number 1 on the country chart for the week ending January 8, 2011, and stayed at that position for three consistent weeks. It also debuted at number 26 on the U.S. Billboard Hot 100 chart for the week of November 20, 2010, number 36 on Canadian Hot 100 chart for the week of November 20, 2010 and number 30 on the U.S. Billboard Adult Contemporary chart for the week of February 19, 2011.

=== Weekly charts ===
Chart (2010–2011)	Peak position
Canada Country (Billboard)	1
Canada Hot 100 (Billboard)	36
US Billboard Hot 100	26
US Adult Contemporary (Billboard)	22
US Hot Country Songs (Billboard)	1

=== Year-end charts ===
Chart (2011)	Position
US Country Songs (Billboard)	43

=== Decade-end charts ===
Chart (2010–2019)	Position
US Hot Country Songs (Billboard)	45

=== Certifications ===
Region	Certification	Certified units/sales
United States (RIAA)	Platinum	1,000,000^{‡}
^{‡} Sales+streaming figures based on certification alone.
