= Not a Moment Too Soon =

Studio album by Tim McGraw
- Released: March 22, 1994
- Recorded: 1993–1994
- Studios: Javelina (Nashville, Tennessee); Loud Recording (Nashville, Tennessee); Mesa (Nashville, Tennessee); Sound Stage Studios (Nashville, Tennessee)
- Genre: Country
- Length: 32:02
- Label: Curb
- Producers: Byron Gallimore; James Stroud

Tim McGraw chronology
Tim McGraw (1993)	Not a Moment Too Soon (1994)	All I Want (1995)

Singles from Not a Moment Too Soon
- 1. "Indian Outlaw" Released: January 22, 1994; 2. "Don't Take the Girl" Released: March 28, 1994; 3. "Down on the Farm" Released: July 11, 1994; 4. "Not a Moment Too Soon" Released: October 24, 1994; 5. "Refried Dreams" Released: February 20, 1995

Professional ratings
Review scores
Source	Rating
AllMusic	3/5 stars
Robert Christgau	C+
Entertainment Weekly	B−

Not a Moment Too Soon is the second studio album by American country music artist Tim McGraw. It was released on March 22, 1994, by Curb Records. McGraw's breakthrough album, it reached No. 1 on Billboard's Top 200 chart and No. 1 on Billboard Country chart and stayed for 26 consecutive weeks. It was Billboard's best selling album of 1994, selling 6 million copies in the United States alone. For all genres of that year, it was in the top five. The Academy of Country Music named it Album of the Year in 1994.

Five singles were released from this album: in order of release, they were "Indian Outlaw", "Don't Take the Girl", "Down on the Farm", the title track and "Refried Dreams". Respectively, these reached No. 8, No. 1, No. 2, No. 1 and No. 5 on the Billboard Hot Country Songs charts; the first two singles were both Top 20 hits on the Billboard Hot 100 as well.

== Track listing ==
No.	Title	Writer(s)	Length
1.	"It Doesn't Get Any Countrier Than This"	Jerry Vandiver; Randy Archer	2:30
2.	"Give It to Me Strait"	Reese Wilson; Stephen Grauberger	2:46
3.	"Wouldn't Want It Any Other Way"	Ed Hill; David Frasier	3:50
4.	"Down on the Farm"	Jerry Laseter; Kerry Kurt Phillips	2:55
5.	"Not a Moment Too Soon"	Wayne Perry; Joe Barnhill	3:46
6.	"Indian Outlaw"	Tommy Barnes; Jumpin' Gene Simmons; John D. Loudermilk	3:01
7.	"Refried Dreams"	Jim Foster; Mark Petersen	2:45
8.	"Don't Take the Girl"	Craig Martin; Larry W. Johnson	4:09
9.	"40 Days and 40 Nights"	Barnes	2:57
10.	"Ain't That Just Like a Dream"	Tony Mullins; Stan Munsey	3:23
Total length:			32:02

== Personnel ==
Musicians

- Tim McGraw – lead vocals
- Randy McCormick – piano
- Matt Rollings – piano
- Gary Smith – Hammond organ
- Larry Byrom – acoustic guitar
- Mark Casstevens – acoustic guitar
- Dann Huff – electric guitar
- Brent Rowan – electric guitar
- Sonny Garrish – Dobro, pedal steel guitar
- Mike Brignardello – bass guitar
- Lonnie Wilson – drums
- Glen Duncan – fiddle
- Stuart Duncan – fiddle
- Curtis Wright – backing vocals
- Curtis Young – backing vocals

Production

- Byron Gallimore – producer
- James Stroud – producer
- Doug Rich – production assistant
- Neuman, Walker & Associates – art direction, design
- Peter Nash – photography

Technical

- Julian King – engineer, mix assistant
- Lynn Peterzell – engineer, mixing, additional engineer
- Steve Marcantonio – additional engineer
- Russ Martin – additional engineer
- Marty Williams – additional engineer
- Mark Hagen – assistant engineer
- Ken Hutton – assistant engineer
- Mark Hurt – assistant engineer
- Hank Williams – mastering
- Recorded at Loud Recording, Mesa Recording Studio, Sound Stage Studios and Javelina Recording Studios (Nashville, Tennessee)
- Mixed at Loud Recording
- Mastered at MasterMix (Nashville, Tennessee)

== Charts and certifications ==
=== Weekly charts ===
Chart (1994)	Peak position
Australian Albums (ARIA)	78
Canada Top Albums/CDs (RPM)	16
Canada Country Albums/CDs (RPM)	1
US Billboard 200	1
US Top Country Albums (Billboard)	1

=== Year-end charts ===
Chart (1994)	Position
Canada Top Albums/CDs (RPM)	96
Canada Country Albums/CDs (RPM)	3
US Billboard 200	12
US Top Country Albums (Billboard)	1

Chart (1995)	Position
US Billboard 200	30
US Top Country Albums (Billboard)	4

Chart (1996)	Position
US Top Country Albums (Billboard)	30

=== Decade-end charts ===
Chart (1990–1999)	Position
US Billboard 200	63

=== Singles ===
Year	Single	Peak chart positions		
Year	Single	US Country	US	CAN Country
1994	"Indian Outlaw"	8	15	24
1994	"Don't Take the Girl"	1	17	1
1994	"Down on the Farm"	2	—	3
1994	"Not a Moment Too Soon"	1	—	1
1995	"Refried Dreams"	5	—	3

=== Certifications ===
Region	Certification	Certified units/sales
Canada (Music Canada)	2× Platinum	200,000^{^}
United States (RIAA)	6× Platinum	6,000,000^{^}
^{^} Shipments figures based on certification alone.
