= One of These Days (Marcus Hummon song) =

Single by Tim McGraw

from the album Everywhere
- Released: March 9, 1998
- Recorded: 1997
- Genre: Country
- Length: 4:41
- Label: Curb
- Songwriters: Marcus Hummon; Monty Powell; Kip Raines
- Producers: Byron Gallimore; Tim McGraw; James Stroud

Tim McGraw singles chronology
"Just to See You Smile" (1997)	"One of These Days" (1998)	"Just to Hear You Say That You Love Me" (1998)

"One of These Days" is a song written by Marcus Hummon, Monty Powell and Kip Raines, and originally recorded by Hummon on his 1995 album All in Good Time. It was later covered by American country music artist Tim McGraw, whose version was released on March 9, 1998 as the fourth single from his third studio album Everywhere. It peaked at number two in the United States, and number one in Canada.

== Content ==
This song portrays the message of self-forgiveness by explaining three separate incidents as examples.

The song's narrator first reflects on his admitted bullying of a child who was physically different from him and other children who attended the same elementary school.

The narrator secondly reflects on a relationship with a significant other in high school which he abruptly ends as a result of his senseless self-pleasure, inflicting severe emotional abuse to his significant other in the process.

The narrator finally reveals that the hurt that he caused to the people he had previously mentioned in the song eventually stemmed into a deep loathing of himself.

== Track listing ==
Cassette single
A1 - One Of These Days
A2 - Just To See You Smile
B1 - One Of These Days
B2 - Just To See You Smile

== Critical reception ==
Kevin John Coyne of Country Universe gave the song an A grade, saying that if you are "looking to close a three act song with a dramatic resolution, 'born again' is the way to go."

== Music video ==
The music video for McGraw's rendition was directed and produced by Sherman Halsey, and premiered on CMT on March 23, 1998, when CMT named it a "Hot Shot". It shows McGraw singing the song in a church, as well as a mirrored room, where several McGraws are seen in the same shot.

== Chart positions ==
"One of These Days" debuted at number 73 on the U.S. Billboard Hot Country Singles & Tracks for the week of March 14, 1998.

Chart (1998)	Peak position
Canada Country Singles (RPM)	1
US Hot Country Songs (Billboard)	2

=== Year-end charts ===
Chart (1998)	Position
Canada Country Tracks (RPM)	53
US Country Songs (Billboard)	45
