= It's a Pleasure =

It's a Pleasure may refer to:

- It's a Pleasure (album), 2014 album by Baxter Dury
- It's a Pleasure (film), 1945 film directed by William A. Seiter

== See also ==
- It's a Business Doing Pleasure with You, an album by Tim McGraw
- It's a Business Doing Pleasure, album by Helix
