= Maybe We Should Just Sleep on It =

Single by Tim McGraw

from the album All I Want
- Released: October 7, 1996
- Recorded: 1995
- Genre: Country
- Length: 3:55
- Label: Curb
- Songwriters: Jerry Laseter; Kerry Kurt Phillips
- Producers: Byron Gallimore; James Stroud

Tim McGraw singles chronology
"She Never Lets It Go to Her Heart" (1996)	"Maybe We Should Just Sleep on It" (1996)	"It's Your Love" (1997)

"Maybe We Should Just Sleep on It" is a song written by Jerry Laseter and Kerry Kurt Phillips, and recorded by American country music artist Tim McGraw. It was released in October 1996 as the fifth and final single from his third studio album All I Want (1995). It peaked at number 4 on the United States Billboard Hot Country Singles & Tracks chart, while it reached number one on the RPM Country Tracks chart in Canada.

== Content ==
The narrator's significant other has decided to break up with him. He tries to convince her to stay, by saying that they should just sleep on the decision and work it out tomorrow.

== Critical reception ==
Dan Milliken of Country Universe gave the song a C grade, saying that "the generic 'moody' 90′s production does some of the damage, as does a patchwork melody that can’t seem to connect its phrases. But you can also hear McGraw still ironing out his vocal technique, as his likably nervous tremor in the verses meets a series of clumsy trills and some pitchy "baby's and "maybe's."

== Music video ==
The music video was directed and produced by Sherman Halsey. It premiered on CMT on October 11, 1996, during The CMT Delivery Room. It features Tim McGraw performing the song in an empty room.

== Chart positions ==
"Maybe We Should Just Sleep on It" debuted at number 64 on the U.S. Billboard Hot Country Singles & Tracks for the week of October 12, 1996.

Chart (1996–1997)	Peak position
Canada Country Singles (RPM)	1
US Hot Country Songs (Billboard)	4

=== Year-end charts ===
Chart (1997)	Position
Canada Country Tracks (RPM)	57
