= Lewis Lane =

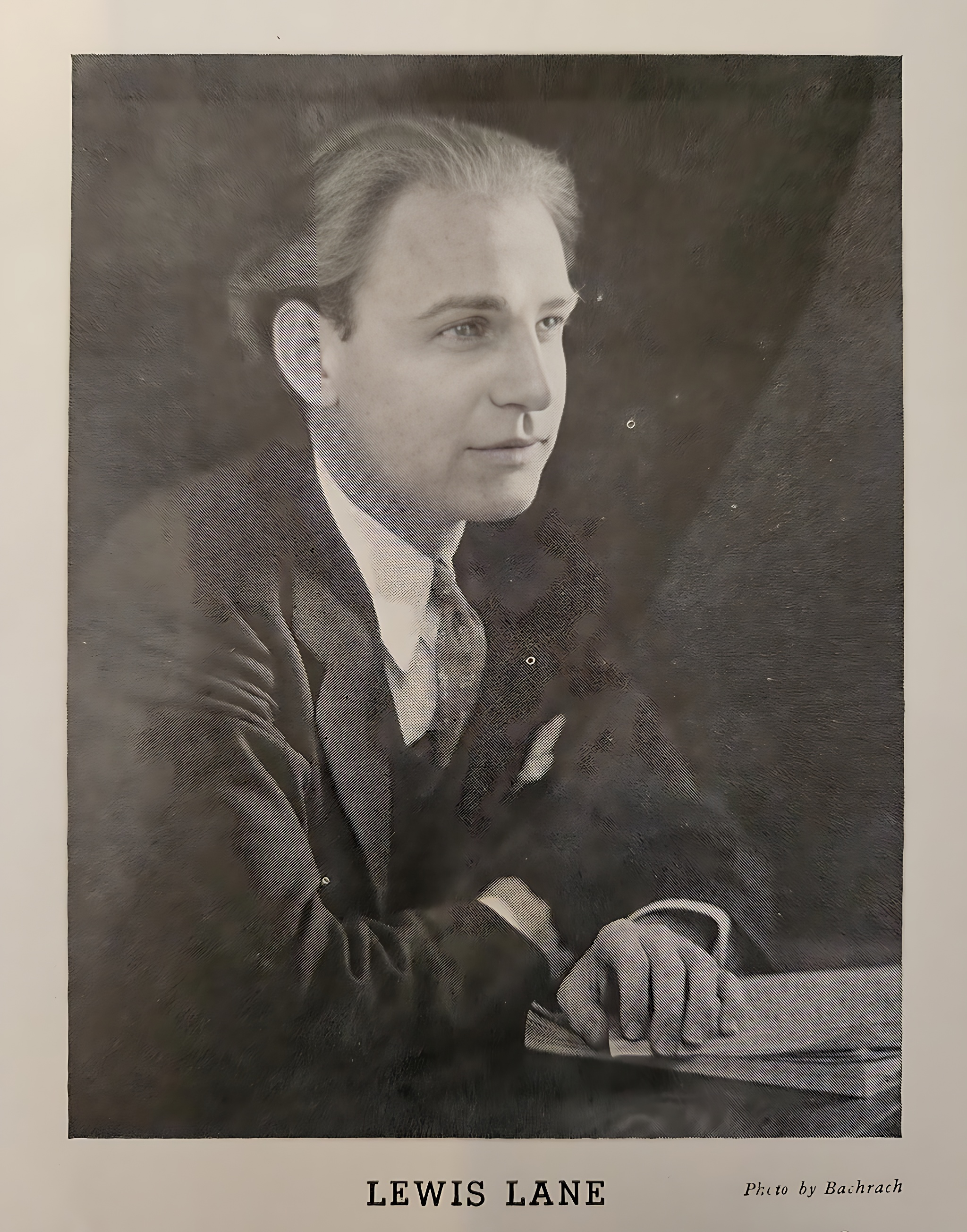
- Born: Charles Lewis Lane; August 3, 1901; Freehold Borough, New Jersey, U.S.
- Died: January 24, 1977 (aged 75); Boston, Massachusetts, U.S.
- Occupations: Pianist, composer, lecturer, musicologist
- Notable work: Compositions: "Fragments" and "Green Mountain Sketches"; Book: "Letting Down the Bar"

Lewis Lane (August 3, 1901 – January 24, 1977) was an American pianist, composer, lecturer, and musicologist with the National Broadcasting Company (NBC) where he worked from 1928 to 1949.

== Early life and education ==
Charles Lewis Lane was born August 3, 1901, in Freehold Borough, New Jersey to August P. and Elizabeth (Cottrell) Lane. At the age of 7, he began his training on the piano and during his teens he studied with Chilion Roselle, organist at the Broadway Presbyterian Church in New York City.

He attended Freehold High School, graduating in 1920 before moving to New York to attend the New York College of Music. During this time he studied with Edwin Hughes and Rubin Goldmark.

== Career ==
Lewis toured as a concert-pianist from 1926 to 1928. His compositions were well known to NBC (NBC-WJZ) radio listeners.

Although he did not stop completely, in 1928 Lane interrupted a promising career as a concert pianist to begin his new career at the National Broadcasting Company (NBC). He founded NBC's Department of Musical Research and was responsible for collating more than 80,000 items. His theory was that cataloging all records and documentation of classical masters is essential to ensure convenient access for anyone seeking information about them in the future. In this role, he earned global recognition and enjoyed widespread acclaim within his field on an international scale.

According to his obituary in The Boston Globe, he gave lectures and judged for the National Guild of Piano Teachers in New England. Most of his works were written for piano and voice. Two of his most significant compositions were "Green Mountain Sketches" and "Fragments -A Tone Poem."

"Fragments" (Opus 6), published in 1938 by the Composers' Press, Inc. is based on four lines from the philosophic writings of Lucretius. as follows: "No single thing abides, but all things flow, Fragment to fragment clings, the things thus grow until we know and name them. By degrees they melt, and are no more the things we know."

The "Green Mountain Sketches" (Opus 5) composed in 1927 is a series of compositions based on his experiences when living completely alone in Vermont for one year and then hiking from Massachusetts to Canada.

Other works are "Prelude" (Opus 2) "Two Character Sketches" (Allegretto and Scherzo). "In Silent Countryside" (Opus 7, No. 2), "John Peel" (traditional English hunting song). Additionally, he is the author of the book, "On Listening to Music" and "Letting Down the Bars" through the Summit Press.

== Personal life and death ==
Upon retiring in 1949, Lane lived in Boston and his beach home in East Dennis, Massachusetts. with his partner George Wimberly Drew. Lewis Lane died January 24, 1977, in his Boston apartment.
