= Can't Be Really Gone =

Single by Tim McGraw

from the album All I Want
- B-side: "That's Just Me"
- Released: October 23, 1995
- Genre: Country
- Length: 3:21
- Label: Curb
- Songwriter: Gary Burr
- Producers: Byron Gallimore; James Stroud

Tim McGraw singles chronology
"I Like It, I Love It" (1995)	"Can't Be Really Gone" (1995)	"All I Want Is a Life" (1996)

"Can't Be Really Gone" is a song written by Gary Burr, and recorded by American country music artist Tim McGraw. It was released in October 1995 as the second single from his album All I Want. It peaked at number two on the United States Billboard country chart, and number four on the Canadian RPM country chart.

== Content ==
"Can't Be Really Gone" is a ballad about a man observing the items left behind in his house by a former lover.

== Critical reception ==
Stephen Thomas Erlewine and Thom Jurek, in their review of the album, said that McGraw delivered the song with sincerity, and that it and other similar songs showed his artistic growth over Not a Moment Too Soon, his last album.

== Chart positions ==
"Can't Be Really Gone" re-entered the U.S. Billboard Hot Country Singles & Tracks as an official single at number 67 for the week of October 21, 1995.

Chart (1995)	Peak position
Canada Country Singles (RPM)	4
US Billboard Hot 100	87
US Hot Country Songs (Billboard)	2

=== Year-end charts ===
Chart (1996)	Position
Canada Country Tracks (RPM)	81
US Country Songs (Billboard)	74
