= All I Want Is a Life =

Single by Tim McGraw

from the album All I Want
- Released: January 15, 1996
- Recorded: 1995
- Genre: Country
- Length: 3:33
- Label: Curb
- Songwriters: Stan Munsey; Tony Mullins; Don Pfrimmer
- Producers: Byron Gallimore; James Stroud

Tim McGraw singles chronology
"Can't Be Really Gone" (1995)	"All I Want Is a Life" (1996)	"She Never Lets It Go to Her Heart" (1996)

"All I Want Is a Life" is a song written by Stan Munsey, Tony Mullins, and Don Pfrimmer and recorded by American country music artist Tim McGraw. It was released in January 1996 as the third single and partial title track to McGraw's album All I Want. The song peaked at number 5 in the United States, and at number 2 in Canada.

== Content ==
The narrator is tired of his everyday life and expresses an ambition for a better one.

== Music video ==
The music video was directed and produced by Sherman Halsey. The video debuted on CMT's "Jammin' Country" on January 20, 1996. It features Tim McGraw performing the song with his band at a deserted circus, along with a bunch of clowns. At the beginning of the video, McGraw is seen walking through the desert, and showing a statue of a funny clown laughing.

== Chart positions ==
"All I Want Is a Life" re-entered the U.S. Billboard Hot Country Singles & Tracks chart as an official single at number 74 for the week of January 20, 1996.

Chart (1996)	Peak position
Canada Country Singles (RPM)	2
US Hot Country Songs (Billboard)	5

=== Year-end charts ===
Chart (1996)	Position
Canada Country Tracks (RPM)	37
US Country Songs (Billboard)	68
