= National Music Council =

American national organization

The National Music Council of the United States is an organization listed under Title 36 of the United States Code, founded in 1940 and chartered by the 84th Congress in 1956. The Council is composed of organizations of national scope interested in the development of music in the country. It represents the country to the International Music Council of UNESCO.

== History ==
The National Music Council was co-founded in 1940 by Julia Ober, Harold Spivacke, Franklin Dunham, and Edwin Hughes.

== Members ==
- Academy of Country Music
- American Academy of Teachers of Singing
- American Composers Forum
- American Federation of Musicians
- American Guild of Musical Artists
- American Guild of Organists
- American Harp Society
- American Music Center
- American Orff-Schulwerk Association
- American Society of Composers, Authors and Publishers
- Broadcast Music, Inc.
- Chamber Music America
- Chopin Foundation of the United States
- Conductors Guild
- Country Music Association
- Delta Omicron international music fraternity
- Early Music America
- Interlochen Center for the Arts
- International Alliance for Women in Music
- International Association of Jazz Educators
- International Federation of Festival Organizations (FIDOF)
- International Music Products Association
- League of American Orchestras
- Mu Phi Epsilon, international professional music fraternity
- Music & Entertainment Industry Educators Association
- Music Critics Association of North America
- National Association for Music Education
- Music Performance Fund
- Music Publishers Association of the United States
- Music Teachers National Association
- National Academy of Popular Music
- The Recording Academy
- National Association of Negro Musicians
- National Association of Teachers of Singing
- National Federation of Music Clubs
- National Flute Association
- National Guild of Community Schools of the Arts
- National Guild of Piano Teachers/American College of Musicians
- National Music Publishers Association
- National Opera Association
- Recording Industry Association of America
- SESAC
- Sigma Alpha Iota international music fraternity (SAI)
- Songwriters Guild of America

== American Eagle Awards ==
Each year the Council presents the American Eagle Awards for distinguished service to American music. The recipients include:

- 1982: Yehudi Menuhin and Jule Styne
- 1983: Van Cliburn and Benny Goodman
- 1984: Virgil Thomson and Lionel Hampton
- 1985: George Wein (Kool Jazz Festival) and Otto Luening
- 1986: Morton Gould and Dizzy Gillespie
- 1987: Odetta and Carnegie Hall (Isaac Stern)
- 1988: Betty Allen and Dave Brubeck
- 1989: William Schuman and Blue Note Records (Bruce Lundvall, President)
- 1990: Rise Stevens and Billy Taylor
- 1991: Marian Anderson and Peter Schickele
- 1992: Elliott Carter and Max Roach
- 1993: Lena Horne and Roberta Peters
- 1994: Richard Riley and Jim Chapin
- 1995: Dorothy DeLay and Lee Eliot Berk
- 1996: Betty Carter, Bob McGrath and Shari Lewis
- 1997: Phil Ramone, The Oak Ridge Boys
- 1998: The Marsalis Family, John Sykes, Texaco, Inc. (Corporate Award)
- 1999: Roy Clark and Clark Terry, American Express (Corporate Award)
- 2000: Schuyler Chapin, Roberta Guaspari, And Leonard Slatkin
- 2001: John Corigliano, Michael Kamen, and Marian McPartland
- 2002: Margaret Whiting, Dawn Upshaw; United Service Organizations (USO)
- 2003: Richie Havens, William Warfield, The Waverly Consort
- 2004: Hal David, MetLife Foundation
- 2005: Stephen Sondheim, Sesame Workshop, Congressman John Conyers, Jr., Senator Orrin Hatch
- 2006: Richard Adler, Barbara Cook, Ervin M. Drake, Henry Juszkiewicz
- 2007: Clive Davis, Sheldon Harnick, VH1 Save the Music Foundation
- 2008: Lorin Maazel and Tom Chapin
- 2009: Herbie Hancock, Quincy Jones and the Hard Rock Cafe
- 2010: Kenny Rogers, Suzanne Vega, Ann Johns Ruckert, John Mahlmann and The Musical Instrument Museum, Phoenix
- 2011: Paquito D'Rivera, Nile Rodgers, Peter Yarrow, Doris Duke Charitable Foundation
- 2012: Theodore Bikel, Judy Collins, Paul Shaffer, Sonny Fox (Golden Eagle Award), Cracker Barrel Country Store
- 2015: Kris Kristofferson, Charley Pride, Jim Lauderdale, Jim Halsey, Sherman Halsey, Music Makes Us
- 2016: Emmylou Harris, Vince Gill, Grand Ole Opry
- 2017: Crystal Gayle, Patti Smith, Harry Shearer
- 2018: Chick Corea, The Manhattan Transfer
- 2019: George Clinton, Vince Guaraldi, The Country Music Hall of Fame
- 2021: Take 6, Music Educators of America
- 2022: David Lowery
- 2023: Ray Chew and Vivian Scott Chew
- 2024: David Amram
- 2025: Rosanne Cash
- 2026: Raul Malo
