= Emotional Traffic =

Studio album by Tim McGraw
- Released: January 24, 2012
- Studios: Dark Horse Recording (Franklin, Tennessee); Blackbird Studio and Ocean Way Nashville (Nashville, Tennessee)
- Genre: Country
- Length: 51:50
- Label: Curb
- Producers: Byron Gallimore; Tim McGraw; Darran Smith

Tim McGraw chronology
Number One Hits (2010)	Emotional Traffic (2012)	Tim McGraw & Friends (2013)

Singles from Emotional Traffic
- 1. "Better Than I Used to Be" Released: November 28, 2011; 2. "Right Back Atcha Babe" Released: June 25, 2012

Professional ratings
Aggregate scores
Source	Rating
Metacritic	(62/100)
Review scores
Source	Rating
AllMusic	4/5 stars
American Songwriter	3.5/5 stars
Country Weekly	(favorable)
Entertainment Weekly	B
Los Angeles Times	2/4 stars
The New York Times	(average)
Rolling Stone	3.5/5 stars
Slant Magazine	2/5 stars
Uncut	1/5 stars
USA Today	3/4 stars
The Washington Post	(average)

Emotional Traffic is the eleventh studio album by American country music artist Tim McGraw, released on January 24, 2012. It is his final album to be released by Curb Records, a label he has been with since his self-titled 1993 debut album.

== Background ==
Emotional Traffic was originally completed in late 2010, but was held by Curb Records. In an interview with "The Boot", McGraw expressed his frustration with the label saying "All the songs have been done for a long time, and the label has had it; It's the last album that they have of mine, so they're trying to hold on to it as long as they can." On May 13, 2011, Curb Records filed a breach-of-contract suit against McGraw, alleging that McGraw recorded tracks for the album too early prior to its delivery to the label.

Several days later, McGraw filed a countersuit against the label seeking advance payment and recording-fund reimbursement, unspecified damages, and a jury trial, which began in July 2012.

NPR featured Emotional Traffic in its website's First Listen series, streaming the album in its entirety beginning January 16, 2012.

== Track listing ==
No.	Title	Writer(s)	Length
1.	"Halo"	Jedd Hughes, Luke Laird	4:57
2.	"Right Back Atcha Babe"	Dave Pahanish, Joe West	4:51
3.	"One Part, Two Part" (featuring Faith Hill)	Dee Ervin	3:32
4.	"I Will Not Fall Down"	Tim McGraw, Martina McBride, Brad Warren, Brett Warren	4:35
5.	"The One"	Angie Aparo, Brad Warren, Brett Warren	3:52
6.	"Better Than I Used to Be"	Ashley Gorley, Bryan Simpson	3:22
7.	"Touchdown Jesus"	Rhett Akins, Dallas Davidson, Ben Hayslip	4:04
8.	"The One That Got Away"	Pahanish, West	4:44
9.	"Felt Good on My Lips"	Brett Beavers, Jim Beavers, Brad Warren, Brett Warren	4:39
10.	"Hey Now"	B. Beavers, J. Beavers, Brad Warren, Brett Warren	4:15
11.	"Only Human" (featuring Ne-Yo)	Aparo, Ty Lacy, Shaffer Smith	3:52
12.	"Die by My Own Hand"	David Tolliver, Chad Warrix, Rivers Rutherford	5:07

== Personnel ==
Compiled from liner notes.

Musicians

- Tony Harrell – Wurlitzer electric piano (1, 3, 5, 10), acoustic piano (4, 8, 9) synthesizers (8)
- Rami Jaffee – Hammond B3 organ (1, 3–5, 8–10)
- Jamie Muhoberac – synthesizers (1–5, 7–12), Hammond B3 organ (2), acoustic piano (8, 9), Wurlitzer electric piano (9)
- Steve Nathan – synthesizers (2, 12), acoustic piano (6), Hammond B3 organ (6, 7, 12), Wurlitzer electric piano (7)
- Jeff McMahon – Hammond B3 organ (11), synthesizers (11)
- Rusty Anderson – electric guitar (1, 4, 5, 8–10), acoustic guitar (3, 8)
- Dan Dugmore – acoustic guitar (1, 4, 9, 10), steel guitar (1–3, 5–8, 12)
- Dave Levita – electric guitar (1, 3–5, 8–10), acoustic guitar (8)
- Troy Lancaster – electric guitar (2, 6, 7, 12)
- Jerry McPherson – electric guitar (2, 6–9, 11, 12)
- Bryan Sutton – acoustic guitar (2, 6, 7, 12)
- Byron Gallimore – electric guitar (4, 8, 9, 11), 12-string guitar (11)
- Jay Joyce – electric guitar (9)
- Denny Henningson – electric guitar (11)
- Bob Minner – acoustic guitar (11)
- Darran Smith – electric guitar (11)
- Deano Brown – mandolin (11)
- Paul Bushnell – bass (1–10, 12)
- John Marcus – bass (11)
- Abe Laboriel Jr. – drums (1, 3–5, 8–10), percussion (3, 10)
- Shannon Forrest – drums (2, 6, 7, 12), percussion (2, 12)
- Billy Mason – drums (11)
- David Dunkley – congas (11), percussion (11)

Background vocals

- Tim McGraw – lead vocals (all tracks), backing vocals (10)
- Greg Barnhill (1, 2, 4, 5, 7–9, 12)
- Perry Coleman (2, 7, 9, 12)
- Faith Hill (3)
- Angie Aparo (5)
- Wes Hightower (6)
- Byron Gallimore (9)
- Jim Beavers (10)
- The Warren Brothers (10)
- Ne-Yo (11)

Production

- Missi Gallimore – A&R direction
- Byron Gallimore – producer, mixing
- Tim McGraw – producer
- Darran Smith – producer (11)
- Julian King – engineer
- Sara Lesher – additional recording, Pro Tools engineer
- Erik Lutkins – additional recording, Pro Tools engineer
- David Bryant – assistant engineer
- Lowell Reynolds – assistant engineer (1, 3–5, 8, 10)
- Colin Heldt – assistant engineer (11)
- Jason Hall – guitar overdub engineer (9)
- Christian Baker – vocal recording (11)
- Adam Ayan – mastering
- Glenn Sweitzer – art direction, design
- Danny Clinch – photography

Studios

- Ne-Yo's vocals were recorded at Germano Studios (New York City, New York).
- Edited, overdubbed, and mixed at Essential Sound Studios (Houston, Texas).
- Mastered at Gateway Mastering (Portland, Maine).

== Chart performance ==
=== Weekly charts ===
Chart (2012)	Peak position
Australian Albums (ARIA)	14
Australian Country Albums (ARIA)	1
Canadian Albums (Billboard)	7
UK Country Albums (Official Charts)	2
US Billboard 200	2
US Top Country Albums (Billboard)	1

=== Year-end charts ===
Chart (2012)	Position
US Billboard 200	104
US Top Country Albums (Billboard)	23

=== Singles ===
Year	Single	Peak chart positions		
Year	Single	US Country	US	CAN
2011	"Better Than I Used to Be"	5	52	71
2012	"Right Back Atcha Babe"	59	—	—
"—" denotes releases that did not chart
