= Everywhere (Tim McGraw song) =

Single by Tim McGraw

from the album Everywhere
- Released: July 7, 1997
- Recorded: 1997
- Genre: Country
- Length: 4:50 (album version); 4:27 (radio edit)
- Label: Curb
- Songwriters: Mike Reid; Craig Wiseman
- Producers: Byron Gallimore; James Stroud; Tim McGraw

Tim McGraw singles chronology
"It's Your Love" (1997)	"Everywhere" (1997)	"Just to See You Smile" (1997)

Music video
- "Everywhere" on YouTube

"Everywhere" is a song written by Mike Reid and Craig Wiseman, and recorded by American country music singer Tim McGraw. It was released in July 1997 as the second single from his album of the same name. The song reached the top of the Billboard Hot Country Singles & Tracks chart and peaked at number 2 on the RPM Country Tracks chart in Canada. Despite reaching Number One on Billboard Hot Country Singles & Tracks (Now Hot Country Songs), the song did not appear on McGraw's Greatest Hits album. It did, however, later appear on his second Greatest Hits package, Reflected: Greatest Hits Vol. 2.

== Content ==
The narrator describes a former significant other and her decision to end their relationship after a disagreement over their future together as a couple — he foresees plans on leaving the small community in which they were both born and raised, and live a life of travel in hopes that she would accompany him in such life, but she steadfastly insists in staying in said community. Almost from the instant that the narrator begins his traveling life, he claims that he sees his significant other, albeit in spirit, appearing in every destination in North America that he visits. Furthermore, whenever he does return to their hometown, he is regularly informed by its residents of her new life — she has married another man and they have subsequently started a family together. And although the narrator reaches the conclusion that his significant other is no longer in his life, he nevertheless proclaims that he will eternally carry her spirit with him in his travels with great emotion just as he always has.

== Critical reception ==
Kevin John Coyne of Country Universe gave the song an A grade, saying that its "understated delivery packs the song with such emotional heft that the unresolved sadness lingers after the song has ended." He goes on to call it the moment where McGraw discovers "subtlety and finds it suits him quite well."

== Music video ==
The music video was directed and produced by Sherman Halsey, and premiered on CMT on July 11, 1997, during The CMT Delivery Room.

== Lawsuit ==
In 2007, songwriter James Martinez filed a $20 million lawsuit against McGraw, Reid and Wiseman. The suit alleges that McGraw lifted “Everywhere” from an audio cassette tape containing Martinez' original track "Anytime, Anywhere, Amanda." Martinez provided the cassette to the same songwriters who wrote the song "Everywhere" for McGraw's 1997 album of the same name. The suit also alleges that McGraw and other defendants internationally released and distributed the “Everywhere” album containing their infringing copies of a song substantially similar to the Martinez's song. McGraw's attorneys stated that they are confident the case will be dismissed altogether, and described the allegations as being "totally without merit." In August 2008, the lawsuit was transferred from Texas to the federal district court in Nashville, Tennessee.

A summary judgment in favor of McGraw was issued in 2013. An appellate court upheld that decision in 2014.

== Chart positions ==
"Everywhere" debuted at number 72 on the U.S. Billboard Hot Country Singles & Tracks for the week of July 5, 1997, at the same time that McGraw's previous single "It's Your Love" was at number one.

Chart (1997)	Peak position
Canada Country Singles (RPM)	2
US Hot Country Songs (Billboard)	1

=== Year-end charts ===
Chart (1997)	Position
Canada Country Tracks (RPM)	32
US Country Songs (Billboard)	22

== Certifications ==
Certifications for Everywhere
Region	Certification	Certified units/sales
United States (RIAA)	Gold	500,000^{‡}
^{‡} Sales+streaming figures based on certification alone.
