= Refried Dreams =

Single by Tim McGraw

from the album Not a Moment Too Soon
- Released: February 20, 1995
- Recorded: 1994
- Genre: Country music, Novelty
- Length: 2:45
- Label: Curb
- Songwriters: Jim Foster; Mark Petersen
- Producers: Byron Gallimore; James Stroud

Tim McGraw singles chronology
"Not a Moment Too Soon" (1994)	"Refried Dreams" (1995)	"I Like It, I Love It" (1995)

"Refried Dreams" is a song written by Mark Petersen and Jim Foster and recorded by American country music artist Tim McGraw. It was released in February 1995 as the fifth and final single from McGraw's 1994 album Not a Moment Too Soon. The song peaked at number 5 on the US Billboard Hot Country Singles & Tracks (now Hot Country Songs) chart. It was featured in the CoolGames Inc game Tim McGraw's What If? Trucks: Fates.

== Content ==
The song is about a woman who left the relationship without warning. To get over his despair, he goes to Mexico to rekindle some old dreams, or in this case, what he calls "refried dreams."

The song is a pun on the Mexican dish refried beans.

== Music video ==
The music video was directed and produced by Sherman Halsey, who directed almost all of Tim McGraw's music videos. It premiered on CMT on February 22, 1995, during The CMT Delivery Room. It was filmed in Tijuana, Mexico, and features Tim McGraw singing the song in a Mexican-themed town, as well as interacting with him walking across a busy street. It changes from day to night. The last scene of the video shows him performing with his band The Dancehall Doctors.

== Chart positions ==
"Refried Dreams" debuted at number 57 on the U.S. Billboard Hot Country Singles & Tracks for the week of February 25, 1995

Chart (1995)	Peak position
Canada Country Singles (RPM)	3
US Hot Country Songs (Billboard)	5

=== Year-end charts ===
Chart (1995)	Position
Canada Country Tracks (RPM)	78
US Country Songs (Billboard)	50

== Parodies ==
- American country music parody artist Cledus T. Judd released a parody of "Refried Dreams" titled "Refried Beans" on his 1995 album Cledus T. Judd (No Relation).
