= Connie B. Gay =

American music entrepreneur (1914–1989)

Background information
- Born: Connie Barriot Gay; August 22, 1914; Lizard Lick, North Carolina
- Died: December 3, 1989 (aged 75) McLean, Virginia
- Genre: Country
- Occupations: Country music entrepreneur and media mogul
- Years active: 1941–1972

Connie Barriot Gay (August 22, 1914 – December 3, 1989) was an American music entrepreneur who is renowned as a "founding father" and "major force" in country music. He is credited with coining the country music genre, which had previously been called hillbilly music. Gay was the founding president of the Country Music Association (CMA) and co-founder of the Country Music Hall of Fame and Museum. The CMA established the Connie B. Gay Award to recognize outstanding service to the CMA by a member not serving on the board of directors.

Gay leveraged his musical insight into a profitable empire that extended his legacy into the modern era. He was responsible for discovering some of the talent that now resides in the Hall of Fame, and was himself inducted in 1980, for significant contributions as a music executive.

== Early life ==
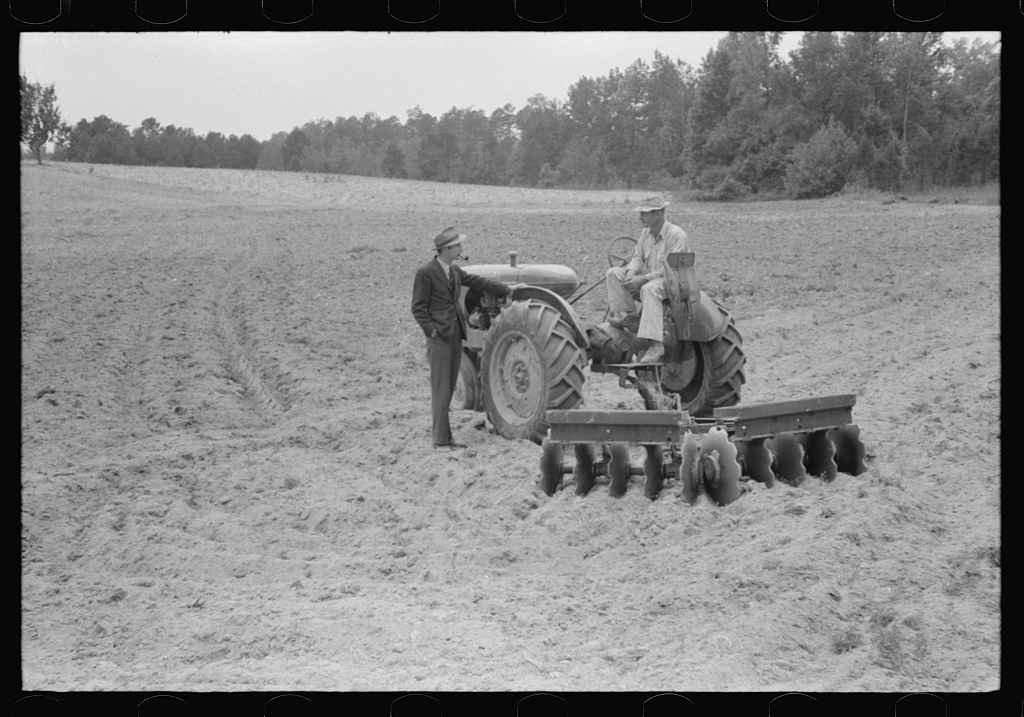
Gay, Farm Security Administration (FSA) county supervisor, speaks to Emery Hooper about his tractor and disc plow, purchased with an FSA cooperative community service loan; near Prospect Hill, Caswell County, North Carolina

Gay was born in Lizard Lick, North Carolina, on August 22, 1914. His parents, John William Gay and Mary Etta Ferrell Gay, owned a 17-acre tobacco farm where Gay worked as he grew up. He was prepared to carry on the family operation after his parents retired, and most of his efforts were focused towards that end. He supplemented his income and farming knowledge through employment as a farm extension agent in Caswell County, North Carolina. However, instead of farming, Gay became "a major force in country music"; known as a "media magician" and a "leading entrepreneur of the 1950s".

Gay graduated from North Carolina State University in 1935, receiving a Bachelor of Science in Agricultural Education. He then worked a variety of jobs including a soil surveyor, a proponent of the Rural Electrification program, even a stint as a carny, where he depended on making sales to succeed.

In 1938, Gay became an employee of the US government, working for the Farm Security Administration (FSA) in various areas. He became a news commentator in 1941 for a recurring radio broadcast called the National Farm and Home Hour. The show was broadcast daily throughout World War II. Gay, learning media operations during those years, decided to pursue it as a vocation. In 1946 he left his government employment and ventured into the private sector, ultimately becoming a success in the field of country music.

== Career ==
From 1946 to 1960, Connie Gay was a disc jockey, concert promoter, artistic talent scout/manager, owner of radio and television stations, and music executive.

=== Broadcasting ===
In 1946, Connie Gay persuaded Frank Blair, the program manager of WARL, a radio station in Arlington, Virginia, to let him do a half-hour show at noon each day. Gay offered to forego a salary in exchange for a percentage of the advertising revenue, and an agreement was reached. His show, Town and Country Time, was promoted as offering "a little bit of town and an awful lot of country" and broadcast six days a week. Gay had the business sense to register his program's name as a trademark, an important factor in measuring his financial success. The endeavor was very successful, growing to a three-hour program that was syndicated across the United States and to some international markets on the Armed Forces Network. Because Gay owned the rights to his Town and Country moniker, all negotiations related to its use required his assent. Connie Gay realized lucrative gains from brokering the program's syndication.

In 1954, Connie Gay began broadcasting a televised version of Town and Country Time on WMAL-TV in Washington, D.C., while continuing to syndicate the audio portion to the more than 1800 radio stations signed on to his network. He would discover Jimmy Dean and Patsy Cline soon after, and both became regular cast members of the TV program. By year's end, the TV program was being syndicated to 40 different stations.

By 1956, Town and Country Time was airing in 50 urban markets, including Spokane, Tulsa, Houston, Los Angeles, and Detroit. Gay had formed a company under his moniker called Town and Country Enterprises to manage his assets which had grown to include radio stations he then owned, and artists he promoted and managed. By year's end, Connie Gay had amicably severed all ties with WARL, giving his full attention to his own enterprise. He was a leading contender for Billboard's Tycoon of the Year award, with an estimated annual gross of $2 million.

=== Talent management and promotions ===
Connie Gay was involved in promoting new talent through his broadcast medium, and booking acts to an array of live events. Several country artists that Gay managed, like Patsy Cline, Jimmy Dean, and Roy Clark, became inductees to the Country Music Hall of Fame. In March 1956, Gay booked a young, relatively unknown singer, who was described as a "devastating combination of Frankie Laine, Johnnie Ray, and Billy Daniels" in Dorothy Kilgallen's syndicated column. That night, when Elvis Presley performed for over three hours, has become "the stuff of local legend".

=== Executive positions ===
In 1958, Connie Gay helped found the Country Music Association and served as its first president. Gay called for a meeting in his hotel room with Wesley Rose, Hubert Long, and Dee Kilpatrick, to discuss the defunct Country Music Disc Jockey Association. The meeting culminated with plans to create a new association that would cater to all aspects of country music, and the CMA was born. Gay also helped organize the Country Music Foundation, which operates the Country Music Hall of Fame and Museum. In 1963, the CMA instituted the Connie B. Gay Award as an honor of high prestige. Gay funded the award with his personal assets and established a trust, in his will, to ensure perpetual viability beyond his lifetime. Now called the Founding President's Award, recipients include Roy Acuff, Johnny Cash, Martina McBride, and Brad Paisley.

== Retirement ==
Gay retired in 1972, selling his business assets and terminating his executive endeavors in country music. Gay's career total gross earnings are estimated to be $50 million. Connie Gay died from cancer on December 3, 1989, at the age of 75. His legacy endures, as he is considered "a true founding father of present-day country music".

== Honors ==
In March 1958, Connie Gay was named "C&W Man of the Year" in The Billboard, exceeding the top runner-up, Jim Denny. Gay was inducted into the Country Music Hall of Fame in 1980. The induction states that he played "a seminal role in transforming what was still called "hillbilly" music into a modern entertainment industry in just one decade from his base in the Washington, D.C.–Virginia area". In 1986, Gay was recognized by the Washington Area Music Association with a Special Achievement Award. Connie Gay was inducted into the West Virginia Broadcasting Hall of Fame on September 16, 2006.

== Legacy ==
In 2002, The Washington Post published a story about Connie Gay, saying that he "may be the greatest country music visionary no one's ever heard of". The article outlined his innovations and credited him with several firsts. Gay was the first person to call the genre "country music", distancing himself from the growing pejorative associations of the "hillbilly" moniker and the geographic limitations of a western identity, implied by "country and western".

He was among the first to recognize country music's expanding audience, particularly in urban markets. He was the first to harness the commercial potential of country music, via radio and television broadcasting, in both local and national markets. He was first to broadcast a recurring country format program in a major metropolitan area (WARL in 1946), first to book a country performance into a high-class concert venue (Constitution Hall in 1947), and first to get a television network to broadcast country music programing (NBC in 1948).

Gay also co-founded the first trade organization formed to promote a single genre of music—the Country Music Association—and was the first president of the CMA. Gay was a founding member of the Country Music Foundation, instituted in Nashville, Tennessee, to operate the Country Music Hall of Fame and Museum. The museum is home to a commemorative plaque honoring Gay, which states that he "brought country music to the big city and made it a multi-billion dollar industry".

=== Daring to dream (big) ===
Music historian Charles K. Wolfe praised Gay's insight for "seeing that country music was going to develop on a number of fronts beyond just radio – that it was going to be a concert thing, a TV thing, an image-making thing. He had a synergistic vision of how country music was going to work in the modern age and he was exactly right."

In 1983, Billboard quoted Connie Gay's candid reflection of his shared success with country music when he stated: "I didn't have an idea that country music would reach the gigantic proportions it has reached both here and internationally. On the other hand, you can dream, can't you?"
