= All in Good Time (Marcus Hummon album) =

Studio album by Marcus Hummon
- Released: September 5, 1995
- Studio: The Money Pit, Imagine Sound, Emerald Sound Studios and Woodland Digital (Nashville, Tennessee): Uno Mas Studio (Brentwood, Tennessee)
- Genre: Country
- Length: 44:57
- Label: Columbia
- Producer: Monroe Jones

Marcus Hummon chronology
All in Good Time (1995)	The Sound of One Fan Clapping (1997)

All in Good Time is the debut album of American country music artist Marcus Hummon. Released in late 1995 on Columbia Records Nashville, it produced one chart hit for him on the Billboard country charts in "God's Country, USA", which peaked at number 73.

== Content ==
Three of this album's tracks were later recorded by other artists: "Honky Tonk Mona Lisa" was recorded in 1995 by Doug Stone on his 1995 album Faith in Me, Faith in You, and by Neal McCoy on his 2003 album The Luckiest Man in the World. "Bless the Broken Road" was originally recorded by Nitty Gritty Dirt Band on their 1994 album Acoustic, and Hummon's version features a backing vocal from band member Jeff Hanna. This song was later recorded by Melodie Crittenden (1998), Geoff Moore, Sons of the Desert (both 1999), Rascal Flatts (2004), and Selah (2005); Crittenden, Rascal Flatts, and Selah all released their versions as singles. "One of These Days" was later recorded by Tim McGraw for his 1997 album Everywhere, from which it was released as a single.

== Critical reception ==
Michael McCall, in his review for New Country magazine, gave the album three stars out of five. McCall said that the album did not have a traditionally country sound but had mostly strong lyrics and "extravagantly musical" arrangements. His review also cited "Bless the Broken Road" as a standout track, but called "God's Country, USA" the album's "major clunker."

== Track listing ==
1. "Hittin' the Road" (Marcus Hummon) – 3:19
2. "God's Country, USA" (Hummon, Thomas "Butch" Curry) – 4:16
3. "One of These Days" (Hummon, Monty Powell, Kip Raines) – 4:40
4. "Honky Tonk Mona Lisa" (Hummon, Darrell Scott) – 3:25
5. "The Next Step" (Hummon, Kent Blazy, Sharon Blazy) – 3:16
6. "I Do" (Hummon, Powell, Raines) – 3:36
7. "Virginia Reelin'" (Hummon, Eric Silver) – 3:16
8. "Somebody's Leaving" (Hummon, Randy Boudreaux) – 3:20
9. "Bless the Broken Road" (Hummon, Bobby Boyd, Jeff Hanna) – 4:09
10. "As the Crow Flies" (Hummon, Powell, Silver) – 3:39
11. "Bridges over Blue" (Hummon, Silver) – 4:10
12. "All in Good Time" (Hummon) – 3:51

== Personnel ==
Compiled from liner notes.

- Marcus Hummon – vocals, backing vocals (1, 4, 5, 10–12), acoustic guitar (1, 3, 6, 11, 12), additional acoustic guitar (2), banjo (2), electric guitars (4, 10), additional mandolin (7), acoustic piano (9)
- Jeffery Roach – acoustic piano (1–5, 7, 8, 11), organ (1, 3, 4, 10, 11), keyboards (6), pump organ (9)
- Jerry Dale McFadden – organ (10)
- Matt Rollings – acoustic piano (10)
- George Marinelli – electric guitars (1, 2, 5, 10, 11)
- Charlie White – electric guitars (2, 6, 7), additional acoustic guitar (6), acoustic guitar (8)
- Darrell Scott – dobro (1, 2), acoustic guitar (2, 5, 10, 11), pedal steel guitar (2, 4, 5), backing vocals (4, 12), high-strung guitar (12), banjo (12)
- Larry Byrom – electric guitars (4)
- George Cocchini – electric guitars (5, 11)
- Eric Silver – mandolin, (1, 2, 5, 7), acoustic guitar (7), bass (10), fiddle (10)
- Buck Reid – pedal steel guitar (3, 6–9)
- Mark Prentice – bass (1–8, 11), fretless bass (9)
- Kip Raines – drums (1, 2, 4–11), backing vocals (6)
- Scott Crago – percussion (1, 2, 7, 10–12), prayer drum (12)
- Tom Roady – percussion (3, 6, 9, 12)
- Rob Hajacos – violin (3), five-string violin (3), fiddle (7, 8, 12)
- Chris Rodriguez – backing vocals (1, 11)
- Curtis Young – backing vocals (1–3, 7, 8, 10–12)
- Dennis Wilson – backing vocals (1, 3, 10, 12)
- Sarah Hummon-Stevens – backing vocals (2)
- Curtis Wright — backing vocals (2, 7, 8)
- Matraca Berg – backing vocals (9)
- Jeff Hanna – backing vocals (9)

=== Production ===
- Monroe Jones – producer
- Jim Dineen – recording
- Chuck Ainlay – mixing
- Ed Seay – mixing
- Milan Bogdan – assistant engineer, additional engineer
- Neal Merrick – assistant engineer, additional engineer
- Doug Sarrett – assistant engineer, additional engineer
- Brian Talbot – assistant engineer, additional engineer
- Denny Purcell – mastering at Georgetown Masters (Nashville, Tennessee)
- Bill Johnson – art direction
- Jodi Lynn Miller – art direction
- Timothy White – photography
- Creative Trust – management
