= Jim Halsey =

American artist manager, agent, and impresario

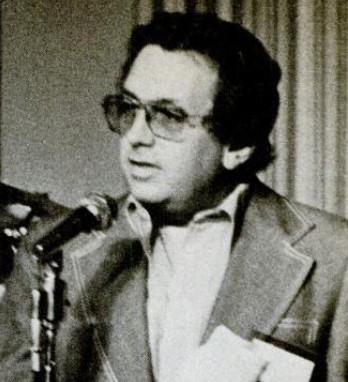
- Halsey in 1974
- Born: 1930 (age 95–96); Independence, Kansas, U.S.
- Occupations: Artist manager, artist agent, impresario
- Years active: 1949–present
- Children: Sherman Halsey; Gina Halsey

Jim Halsey is an American artist manager, agent and impresario. He and his staff have guided, promoted or managed the careers of numerous prominent U.S. entertainers - particularly country music stars - including 29 inductees of the Country Music Hall of Fame and 10 inductees of the Rock and Roll Hall of Fame.

Halsey and his staff have handled the careers of Roy Clark, the Oak Ridge Boys, Waylon Jennings, Reba McEntire, Clint Black, Minnie Pearl, Tammy Wynette, Merle Haggard, Dwight Yoakam, the Judds, Jimmy Dean, Mel Tillis, Lee Greenwood, Hank Thompson, Don Williams, Woody Herman, James Brown, Roy Orbison, Leon Russell, Ricky Nelson, the Righteous Brothers, and many others.

Halsey has organized and presented country music performances, particularly in the central U.S., but also on the coasts and abroad. His 1976 tour, presenting Roy Clark and the Oak Ridge Boys in the Soviet Union, won praise both culturally and in diplomatic circles. Clark's return tour of the USSR in 1988 was the subject of a television documentary. The booking agency division of the Jim Halsey Company, Inc., was sold to the William Morris Agency in 1990; Halsey remained a consultant for several years.

== Early life ==
Jim Halsey was born in Independence, Kansas to Harry E. Halsey Jr. and Carrie Lee (Messick) Halsey. He attended Washington School, junior and senior high school and Independence Junior College. At age twelve, Halsey organized the Junior Marines (ages 9–12) to stimulate war bond sales. They drilled every Saturday at Washington School. Dues were 2 cents per member.

A few years later, Halsey formulated his goals after absorbing the story of the noted impresario Sol Hurok, in his book Impresario. In October 1949, following a vision from a book report assignment on the life of Hurok, junior college student Halsey was inspired to present shows and dances at Memorial Hall and the Independence area. His first show/dance, Leon McAuliffe was the beginning of promotions that would include big band concerts, Broadway shows, classical music presentations, wrestling, ice shows and circuses.

== Career ==
=== The Jim Halsey Company, Inc. ===
In December 1951, Halsey founded the Jim Halsey Co. talent agency with first client Hank Thompson and his Brazos Valley Boys, subsequently discovering and adding Wanda Jackson (1956) and Roy Clark (1959), eventually maintaining a roster of 40 to 50 stars.

Over the next 40 years, the company would become the world's largest country music agency, presenting their artists on a global basis. Concerts sold out from Carnegie Hall and Madison Square Garden, to Wembley Stadium, London Palladium and Royal Albert Hall, Rossiya Theatre Moscow and Sports Coliseum Leningrad, to Tokyo Jazz Festival, Montreux Jazz Festival, Soldier Field in Chicago, Constitution Hall in Washington, D.C. and nearly every major fair and festival around the world. During this 40 years, the company booked over 120,000 concert dates for their roster of stars.

Halsey has organized and presented country music performances all over the world, in many places for the first time. His 1976 tour of the Soviet Union headlining Roy Clark and the Oak Ridge Boys won praise both culturally and in diplomatic circles. Halsey's efforts expanded country music into Europe, Asia, Africa and South America.

Halsey also owned the Churchill Records label in the 1980s.

=== The Jim Halsey Institute of Music and Entertainment Business ===
From 1994 to 1999, Halsey created and served as director of the award-winning Music and Entertainment Business Program at Oklahoma City University in Oklahoma City, Oklahoma. He is a visiting professor at HED Music College in Yehud, Israel, and lectures and teaches extensively at other colleges and universities around the world. He wrote his first book and seminar series, How To Make It In The Music Business. In March 2010, he launched the Jim Halsey Institute of Music and Entertainment Business, an undergraduate music business program at Independence Community College.

=== Billboard/Starmaker Worldwide Song Contest ===
In 1987, Halsey's company teamed with entertainment industry magazine Billboard to produce the annual Billboard World Song Festival (later the Billboard/Starmaker Worldwide Song Contest), a song-writing competition for amateur composers of country, pop/rock, black, jazz, Latin, and gospel music, with medals and cash prices awarded in each of those categories, in a televised program. Categories for world, rhythm & blues and rap music were added later, the category "black" deleted, and the "pop" and "rock" categories were separated. Merchandise was added to the awards. The program is co-sponsored by Sonicbids, Disc Makers, Casio, GoGirlsMusic.com, D'Addario Strings, TAXI, Indie Band Manager and BluBlocker Sunglasses.

=== Other roles ===
- Member, Advisory Board, National Fiddlers' Hall of Fame

== Awards and recognition ==
- 2018 - Albert Nelson Marquis Lifetime Achievement Award, Marquis Who's Who
- 2015 - American Eagle Award, National Music Council of the United States ("... to honor individuals and institutions who have made comprehensive contributions to musical life in America.")
- 2014 - Induction to International Entertainment Buyers Association Hall of Fame
- 2013 - Kansas Senate Resolution No. 1741, "A resolution congratulating Jim Halsey on his numerous musical accomplishments..."
- 2009 - Induction to Kansas Music Hall of Fame
- 2005 - Impresario of the Year - Kansas Federation of News
- 2000 - Inducted into the Oklahoma Music Hall of Fame
- 1999 - Medal of Honor - Cherokee Honor Society (Tahlequah, Oklahoma)
- 1998 - Governor's Award in Arts & Education - Oklahoma Governor Frank Keating
- 1997 - Lifetime Achievement Award - International Entertainment Buyers Association (IEBA) (Halsey was the first person to receive this award.)
- 1992 - Degree - Doctor of Fine Arts, honoris causa, Baker University
- 1990 - The Jim Halsey Company booking agency division was sold to the William Morris Agency
- 1989 - Medallion - Committee for Artists - Deutsche Democratic Republic (East Germany)
- 1989 - Medallion - Festival of Bregenz - Bregenz, Austria
- 1989 - Citation - Kumamoto Prefectural Government, Japan; Mokihiro Hosokawa, Governor
- 1988 - Distinguished Serviced Award - International Theatrical Agents Association
- 1987 - The Frédéric Chopin Medal presented by PAGART (The Polish Artists Bureau)
- 1986 - Commendation for Outstanding Leadership in Promoting World Peace and Harmony through the Medium of Visual and Performing Arts from the Mayor of Los Angeles, Tom Bradley
- 1985 - Founding President's Award from the Country Music Association "for the person (or persons) who... has rendered the most outstanding service to the Country Music Association in the current year"
- 1984 - International Federation of Festival Organizations (FIDOF) Diploma as promoter for the Neewollah Festival for Promoting Peace and Friendship through Music and Art
- 1982 - Distinguished Leadership Award given by Baker University
- 1982 - Named one of Esquire Magazine's Country Music Heavy 100
- 1982 - The FIDOF Oscar, presented in Cannes, France during the worldwide MIDEM convention by FIDOF Spain President, Augusto Algueró
- 1982 - Recipient of citation at the Golden Orpheus Festival in Sunny Beach, Bulgaria
- 1980 - Recipient of International Ambassador of Country Music Award for SESAC
- 1980 - Recipient of Outstanding Artistic Achievement in Booking Award from Cashbox Magazine
- 1980 - Recipient of Distinguished Kansan Award from Topeka Capitol
- 1978 - Recipient of Cashbox Magazine "Manager of the Year" Award
- 1978 - Recipient of the International Ambassador of Country Music Award for SESAC
- 1977 - Recipient of the Jim Reeves Memorial Award by the Academy of Country Music
- 1958 - Co-founded the New Neewollah Festival in Independence, Kansas (to become Kansas's largest annual festival)
- 1957 - Recipient of the Distinguished Service Award by the Junior Chamber of Commerce in Independence, Kansas

== Affiliations ==
Halsey has served on the following Boards of Directors: the Country Music Association (CMA), The Academy of Country Music (ACM), National Academy of Recording Arts and Sciences (Austin Chapter), Mercantile Bank and Trust Tulsa, Citizens National Bank, and Tulsa Philharmonic. He was a member of the Kansas Film Commission between 1981 and 1985.

== Personal life ==
Halsey is the father of the late director/producer Sherman Halsey and is married to Minisa Crumbo, daughter of American Indian artist Woody Crumbo.

== Published works ==
- How To Make It In The Music Business (book and seminar series) Hawk Publishing Group (October 28, 2000). ISBN 978-0967313153
- Starmaker, ("a comprehensive guide to success in the music industry"), Tate Publishing, 2010. ASIN B00V1DUUTQ
