= Reginald Bedford =

Canadian pianist and music educator (1909–1985)

Reginald Bedford (December 13, 1909, London, Ontario – December 9, 1985, Hamilton, Ontario) was a Canadian pianist and music educator who was part of a piano duo with Evelyn Eby from 1938 through 1979. He and Eby married in 1948. The duo performed in concert at many venues internationally including Eaton Auditorium in Toronto, Wigmore Hall in London, and The Town Hall in New York City. In 1945–1946 the duo had their own weekly radio program with the Canadian Broadcasting Corporation. In addition to his work as a pianist, Bedford was also organist at the All Saints Cathedral in Halifax, Nova Scotia.

A graduate of The Royal Conservatory of Music (1924) and the American Conservatory at Fontainebleau, Bedford's teachers included Lyell Gustin, Percy Grainger, Edwin Hughes, Alfred Madeley Richardson, Carl Friedberg, and Robert Casadesus. He was the head of the piano faculty at the Maritime Conservatory of Music before becoming principal of the Royal Hamilton College of Music from 1944 through 1948. He then opened his own private studio, the Reginald Bedford Piano Studios in Hamilton, which he operated with Eby for several decades. He later taught piano on the faculties of Ontario Ladies' College (now the Trafalgar Castle School) in Whitby in and at McMaster University. His pupils included musicologist and pianist Elaine Keillor, and composer Marjan Mozetich.
