= Not a Moment Too Soon (song) =

Single by Tim McGraw

from the album Not a Moment Too Soon
- B-side: "Refried Dreams"
- Released: October 24, 1994
- Recorded: 1993
- Genre: Country
- Length: 3:46
- Label: Curb
- Songwriters: Wayne Perry; Joe Barnhill
- Producers: Byron Gallimore; James Stroud

Tim McGraw singles chronology
"Down on the Farm" (1994)	"Not a Moment Too Soon" (1994)	"Refried Dreams" (1995)

"Not a Moment Too Soon" is a song written by Wayne Perry and Joe Barnhill and recorded by American country music artist Tim McGraw. It was released on October 24, 1994, as the fourth single and title track from McGraw's 1994 album Not a Moment Too Soon. The song reached number one on the US Billboard Hot Country Singles & Tracks (now Hot Country Songs) charts. Despite reaching that position, the song did not appear on Tim's Greatest Hits album. It did, however, later appear on his second Greatest Hits package, Reflected: Greatest Hits Vol. 2.

== Music video ==
The music video was directed by Sherman Halsey, who directed the majority of McGraw's videos, and features McGraw singing at Battery Point Lighthouse in Crescent City, California.

== Chart performance ==
"Not a Moment Too Soon" debuted at number 61 on the U.S. Billboard Hot Country Singles & Tracks for the week of October 29, 1994.

Chart (1994–1995)	Peak position
Canada Country Singles (RPM)	1
US Hot Country Songs (Billboard)	1

=== Year-end charts ===
Chart (1995)	Position
Canada Country Tracks (RPM)	40
US Country Songs (Billboard)	46
