= List of recipients of the CMA Founding President's Award =

The following list shows all recipients of the Country Music Association's (CMA) Founding President's Award, instituted as the Connie B. Gay Award. The award was established in 1963, in recognition of the outstanding service to the CMA by a member not currently serving as an officer or director. Connie B. Gay, co-founder and first president of the CMA funded the award with his personal assets and established a trust, in his will, to ensure the perpetual viability of this award beyond his lifetime.

== 1960s ==
- 1963 Richard Frank
- 1964 Joe Allison
- 1965 Robert J. Burton
- 1966 Pack Ackerman
- 1967 Gene Nash, Leroy Van Dyke
- 1968 Owen Bradley
- 1969 Johnny Cash

== 1970s ==
- 1970 Frank Clement
- 1971 Ken Nelson
- 1972 Tex Ritter
- 1973 Frank Jones
- 1974 Jack Stapp
- 1975 Hubert Long (posthumously)
- 1976 Roy Horton
- 1977 Hal Cook
- 1978 Bob Tubert
- 1979 Ben Smathers

== 1980s ==
- 1980 Charlie Daniels
- 1981 Roy Acuff
- 1982 Bob Boatman
- 1983 Mary Ann McCready
- 1984 Frank Mull
- 1985 Jim Halsey
- 1986 Merrill Warner
- 1987 Paul Conroy
- 1988 Ron Huntsman

== 1990s ==
- 1990 Allen Brown
- 1991 Bob Saporiti
- 1992 Jim Free
- 1993 Fred Rappoport
- 1994 Helen Farmer
- 1995 Cindy Wilson
- 1996 Marc Oswald
- 1997 Trisha Yearwood
- 1998 Pam Tillis
- 1999 Martina McBride

== 2000s ==
- 2000 Wayne Halper
- 2001 Mayor Bill Purcell
- 2002 Brad Paisley
- 2003 Wynonna Judd
- 2004 Terri Clark
- 2005 Blue County (Aaron Benward and Scott Reeves)
- 2006 No Award given
- 2007 No Award given
- 2008 No Award given
- 2009 No Award given
