= For a Little While =

"For A Little While"

Single by Tim McGraw

from the album Everywhere
- A-side: "Please Remember Me"
- Released: November 3, 1998
- Genre: Country
- Length: 3:33
- Label: Curb
- Songwriters: Steve Mandile; Jerry Vandiver; Phil Vassar
- Producers: Byron Gallimore; Tim McGraw; James Stroud

Tim McGraw singles chronology
"Where the Green Grass Grows" (1998)	"For A Little While" (1998)	"Please Remember Me" (1999)

"For A Little While" is a song written by Steve Mandile, Jerry Vandiver and Phil Vassar, and recorded by American country music artist Tim McGraw. It was released in November 1998 as the sixth and final single from his album Everywhere. The song peaked at number 2 on the Billboard Hot Country Singles & Tracks chart but reached number-one on the Canadian RPM Country Tracks chart.

== Content ==
The song is about a man's wistful reminiscing, particularly one summer season that he spent with a woman who is no longer with him.

== Critical reception ==
Deborah Evans Price, of Billboard magazine reviewed the song favorably, saying that the "gentle rolling piano, sturdy fiddle, and out-in-front guitar work make the strong melody come alive, but McGraw's vocal is what really sells this song." Kevin John Coyne of Country Universe gave the song a B grade, saying that compared to the other singles from this album, this one is the "most frothy and least substantial." He proceeded, saying that it could be "the most historically significant of the singles, given that it’s the blueprint for countless Kenny Chesney hits that followed."

== Chart performance ==
The song debuted at number 74 on the Hot Country Singles & Tracks chart dated November 7, 1998. It charted for twenty weeks on that chart, and peaked at number 2 on the chart dated February 6, 1999. It also peaked at number 37 on the Billboard Hot 100.

Chart (1998–1999)	Peak position
Canada Country Singles (RPM)	1
US Billboard Hot 100	37
US Hot Country Songs (Billboard)	2

=== Year-end charts ===
Chart (1999)	Position
Canada Country Tracks (RPM)	40
US Country Songs (Billboard)	28

== Other versions ==
- Phil Vassar, who co-wrote the song, recorded a version of it for his 2006 album, Greatest Hits, Vol. 1.
