= Indian Outlaw =

Single by Tim McGraw

from the album Not a Moment Too Soon
- Released: January 22, 1994
- Recorded: 1993
- Genre: Country
- Length: 3:01 (Album Version); 4:20 (Dance Mix)
- Label: Curb
- Songwriters: Tommy Barnes; Jumpin' Gene Simmons; John D. Loudermilk
- Producers: Byron Gallimore; James Stroud

Tim McGraw singles chronology
| "Two Steppin' Mind" (1993) | "Indian Outlaw" (1994) | "Don't Take the Girl" (1994) |

"Indian Outlaw" is a song written by Tommy Barnes, Jumpin' Gene Simmons, and John D. Loudermilk, and recorded by American country music artist Tim McGraw. It was released in January 1994 as the first single from his album Not a Moment Too Soon. It was McGraw's breakthrough and first top-40 country hit, peaking at number eight on Billboard Hot Country Singles and Tracks, and number 15 on the Billboard Hot 100.

== Content ==
The song is an up-tempo song set in a minor key, backed by tom-tom drums and fiddle. The narrator describes himself as a rebellious American Indian character, "Half Cherokee and Choctaw". He describes, among other things, his pursuit of a Chippewa lover.

The song contains a sample of Loudermilk's song "Indian Reservation", which is sung as shouting at the end ("Cherokee people, Cherokee tribe! / So proud to live, so proud to die!").

A dance remix of the single was also made, and it appears on McGraw's 2010 album Number One Hits. The song was considered controversial at the time, due to its stereotypical portrayal of Native Americans; as a result, some radio stations refused to play it.

== Critical reception ==
Larry Flick of Billboard called it an "incredible single" that is "positively stuffed with lyrical and musical Native American cliches, from tomtoms to wigwams to peace pipes." He went on to say that if the song became a hit, it would "set relations back 200 years." In a review of Not a Moment Too Soon for the same publication, "Indian Outlaw" was again noted as clichéd; the authors deemed it "either one of the catchiest or one of the stupidest songs ever written."

== Music video ==
Two versions of the video were released. One was for the original version of the song and played on CMT, and the other was for an extended dance mix. Both were directed by Sherman Halsey, who also directed most of McGraw's subsequent videos, and it shows McGraw performing the song at a dancehall, playing a game of billiards, and riding his motorcycle with a female friend.

== Track listings ==
US vinyl, 7"

- A Indian Outlaw (Radio Mix) 2:59
- B Don't Take the Girl 4:09

Germany CD

1. Indian Outlaw (European Version) 2:59
2. Indian Outlaw (American Version) 2:59
3. Indian Outlaw (Dance Version) 4:19

== Charts ==
=== Weekly charts ===
| Chart (1994) | Peak position |
|---|---|
| Canada Country Singles (RPM) | 24 |
| US Billboard Hot 100 | 15 |
| US Hot Country Songs (Billboard) | 8 |

=== Year-end charts ===
| Chart (1994) | Position |
|---|---|
| US Billboard Hot 100 | 90 |

== Certifications ==
| Region | Certification | Certified units/sales |
|---|---|---|
| United States (RIAA) | Platinum | 1,000,000^{‡} |
^{‡} Sales+streaming figures based on certification alone.

== Parodies ==
American country music parody artist Cledus T. Judd released a parody of "Indian Outlaw" titled "Indian In-Laws" on his 1995 album Cledus T. Judd (No Relation).
