= I Like It, I Love It =

Single by Tim McGraw

from the album All I Want
- Released: July 31, 1995
- Genre: Country; country rock
- Length: 3:24
- Label: Curb
- Songwriters: Mark Hall; Jeb Stuart Anderson; Steve Dukes
- Producers: Byron Gallimore; James Stroud

Tim McGraw singles chronology
"Refried Dreams" (1995)	"I Like It, I Love It" (1995)	"Can't Be Really Gone" (1995)

"I Like It, I Love It" is a song written by Jeb Stuart Anderson, Steve Dukes, and Mark Hall, and recorded by American country music artist Tim McGraw. It was released in July 1995 as the first single from his album All I Want. The song is McGraw's ninth single overall, and it became his third number-one single on the Hot Country Songs chart. It was recorded at FAME Studios in Muscle Shoals, Alabama.

== Music video ==
The music video premiered on CMT on August 4, 1995, during The CMT Delivery Room, and was directed and produced by Sherman Halsey. It features McGraw on his touring, using a pop-up style.

== Track listing ==
7" vinyl

- A. "I Like It, I Love It" (album version) - 3:25
- B. "I Like It, I Love It" (club mix) - 3:54

== Custom version ==
A version of the song was made for the NHL's Nashville Predators for use with the team's goal song, in a medley along with "Gold on the Ceiling" by the Black Keys.. This version of the song replaces the line "Don't know what it is about that little girl's lovin'" with "Don't know what it is about the Predators scorin'". Originally, Rock and Roll Pt. 2 was played after I Like It I Love It before it was changed to Gold on the Ceiling.

== Chart performance ==
"I Like It, I Love It" debuted at number 50 on the U.S. Billboard Hot Country Singles & Tracks chart for the week of August 12, 1995, eventually reaching the number one spot.

Chart (1995)	Peak position
Canada Country Singles (RPM)	1
US Billboard Hot 100	25
US Hot Country Songs (Billboard)	1

=== Year-end charts ===
Chart (1995)	Position
Canada Country Tracks (RPM)	7
US Country Songs (Billboard)	3

== Certifications ==
Certifications for I Like It, I Love It
Region	Certification	Certified units/sales
United States (RIAA)	2× Platinum	2,000,000^{‡}
^{‡} Sales+streaming figures based on certification alone.
