= Still (Tim McGraw song) =

Single by Tim McGraw

from the album Southern Voice
- Released: February 1, 2010
- Genre: Country
- Length: 3:43
- Label: Curb
- Songwriters: Lee Brice; Kyle Jacobs; Joe Leathers
- Producers: Byron Gallimore; Tim McGraw; Darran Smith

Tim McGraw singles chronology
"Southern Voice" (2009)	"Still" (2010)	"Felt Good on My Lips" (2010)

"Still" is a song written by Lee Brice, Kyle Jacobs and Joe Leathers, and recorded and co-produced by American country music artist Tim McGraw. It was released in February 2010 as the third single from his tenth studio album, Southern Voice.

== Content ==
"Still" is a moderate up-tempo country song, backed primarily by electric guitar. The song's male narrator describes remembering his favorite place to be in his past, and reminding himself that he can "just be still" in order to reach it.

== Critical reception ==
The song was met with positive reception. Los Angeles Times critic Randy Lewis said that the song had "a pulsating modern rock beat behind his Louisiana twang[…]but lyrically it digs a bit deeper than the melodramatic but superficial hits so closely associated with McGraw." Bobby Peacock of Roughstock rated it 4.5 stars out of 5, saying that "Tim has been forging a darker, deeper and frankly, more interesting sound with each successive album[…]With 'Still,' he is playing all of his artistic strengths and proving that not all of country music has to sound the same." A less favorable review came from Stephen Thomas Erlewine of Allmusic, who called it "a slow, spacy crawl[…]that would not be out of place on a record by a U2 knockoff."

== Chart performance ==
"Still" peaked at number 16 on the US Hot Country Songs chart.

Chart (2010)	Peak position
US Hot Country Songs (Billboard)	16
US Billboard Hot 100	91
Canada Country (Billboard)	11
Canada Hot 100 (Billboard)	94
