= National Opera Association =

American opera association

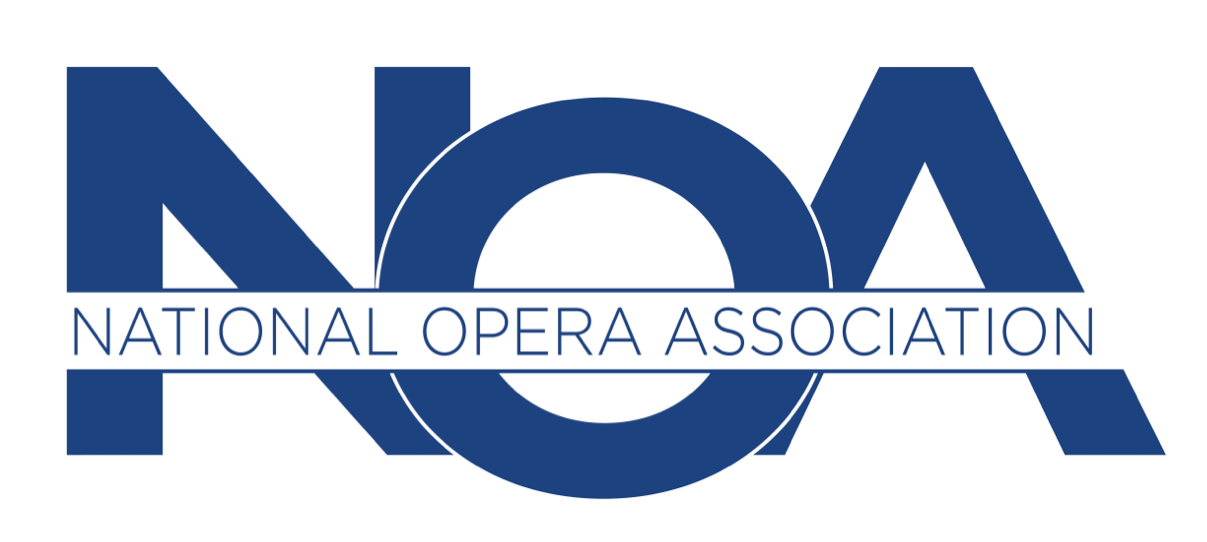
- Abbreviation: NOA
- Formation: 1955; 71 years ago
- Type: 501(c)(3), nonprofit
- Headquarters: Ann Arbor, Michigan, U.S.
- Region served: United States
- Affiliations: National Music Council

The National Opera Association (NOA) is an American service organization that supports the performance, scholarship, and pedagogy of opera. Founded in 1955 with support from the National Music Council, the NOA's membership encompasses opera directors, conductors, composers, coaches, teachers, scholars and enthusiasts. The NOA organizes annual conferences and supports opera education, performance and scholarship in the United States, specializing in training programs for young and collegiate-level artists. The association organizes competitions, awards fellowships, and shares resources for regional and collegiate productions. They also publish scholarly articles and organize a biennial dissertation competition. The NOA publishes The Opera Journal, a refereed scholarly journal, twice a year.

The NOA offers career development grants through their Legacy Project, to further ethnic and racial diversity in professional opera. Their Argento Fellowships, named after composer Dominick Argento, are awarded to outstanding singers and composers, providing full tuition and living fees for an entire graduate degree.

The NOA's Lifetime Achievement Award, first awarded in 1998, recognizes "those who have dedicated their lives to opera". Recipients of the award include Beverly Sills, Marilyn Horne, Jon Vickers, Carlisle Floyd and Sherrill Milnes.
