= She Never Lets It Go to Her Heart =

Single by Tim McGraw

from the album All I Want
- Released: June 17, 1996
- Recorded: 1995
- Genre: Country
- Length: 3:02
- Label: Curb
- Songwriters: Chris Waters; Tom Shapiro
- Producers: Byron Gallimore; James Stroud

Tim McGraw singles chronology
"All I Want Is a Life" (1996)	"She Never Lets It Go to Her Heart" (1996)	"Maybe We Should Just Sleep on It" (1996)

"She Never Lets It Go to Her Heart" is a song written by Chris Waters and Tom Shapiro, and recorded by American country music artist Tim McGraw. It was released in June 1996 as the fourth single from McGraw's All I Want album. The song reached Number One on the Billboard Hot Country Singles & Tracks (now Hot Country Songs) charts.

== Single and album edits ==
The single edit to "She Never Lets It Go to Her Heart," released for retail sale and radio airplay, features an alternate vocal track by McGraw that is slightly different from the original album version. In addition, the backing vocals were remixed, eliminating the "stereo width" effect heard in the album version.

This was also Tim's first single to not have an accompanying music video since "Two Steppin' Mind" in 1993.

== Chart performance ==
"She Never Lets It Go to Her Heart" debuted at number 73 on the U.S. Billboard Hot Country Singles & Tracks for the week of June 22, 1996.

Chart (1996)	Peak position
Canada Country Singles (RPM)	5
US Hot Country Songs (Billboard)	1

=== Year-end charts ===
Chart (1996)	Position
Canada Country Tracks (RPM)	89
US Country Songs (Billboard)	5
