= Edwin Hughes (musician) =

American pianist, composer, music educator and editor (1884–1965)

- Born: August 15, 1884; Washington, D.C., US
- Died: July 17, 1965 (aged 80); New York, New York, US
- Occupations: Pianist, music educator, editor, composer

Edwin Hughes (August 15, 1884 – July 17, 1965) was an American pianist, music educator, music editor, and composer. In 1940 he co-founded the National Music Council.

== Life and career ==
Born in Washington, D.C., Hughes studied piano with S. M. Fabian in his native city before receiving further training on that instrument with Rafael Joseffy in New York City in 1906 and 1907. From 1907 through 1910 he studied with Theodor Leschetizky in Vienna; notably working as his assistant in 1909 and 1910.

Hughes became a well regarded teacher of piano, and based his own approach on the pedagogies of both Joseffy and Leschetizky. He began his teaching career in 1910 at the Ganapol School of Musical Art in Detroit, Michigan. In 1912 he returned to Europe to make his debut as a concert pianist in Vienna. He relocated to Munich where he spent the next four years teaching while simultaneously appearing throughout Germany as a concert pianist. During this time he was interviewed by musicologist Harriette Brower about his teaching. He stated:

If you were to ask Leschetizky about the "Leschetizky Method", he would probably laugh and tell you he has no method, or he would tell you his "method" consists of only two things—firm fingers and pliable wrist. These are the principles upon which I base the technical training of my pupils.

In 1916 Hughes returned to the United States to join the piano faculty at the Volpe Institute of Music where he worked for two years. He made his New York performance début on March 14, 1917, and thereafter was a busy concert pianist in both the United States and Europe for many years. In 1918 he joined the faculty of the Institute of Musical Art (now the Juilliard School) where he taught piano through 1923. From 1920 through 1925 he served as the editor-in-chief of piano music for the publisher G. Schirmer. Some of his notable pupils were pianists Reginald Bedford, Alton Jones, Jeannine Romer Morrison, and Sascha Gorodnitzki.

In 1940 Hughes co-founded the National Music Council with Julia Ober, Harold Spivacke, and Franklin Dunham.

Hughes died in New York City in 1965. The University of South Carolina hold many of his personal papers and items in its library.

== Honors ==
- Citation from National Association Composers and Conductors, 1943
- Citations for patriotic service from War and Navy departments, 1946
- Henry Hadley medal for distinguished services to American Music, 1956
- Citation from National Music Council, 1960
- Citation from National Federation of Music Clubs, 1961
