= Southern Voice (album) =

Studio album by Tim McGraw
- Released: October 20, 2009
- Studios: Dark Horse Recording (Franklin, Tennessee); Blackbird Studio (Nashville, Tennessee); Capitol Studios and NRG Recording Studios (Hollywood, California)
- Genre: Country
- Length: 47:10
- Label: Curb
- Producers: Byron Gallimore; Tim McGraw; Darran Smith

Tim McGraw chronology
Greatest Hits 3 (2008)	Southern Voice (2009)	Number One Hits (2010)

Singles from Southern Voice
- 1. "It's a Business Doing Pleasure with You" Released: June 29, 2009; 2. "Southern Voice" Released: September 21, 2009; 3. "Still" Released: February 1, 2010

Professional ratings
Aggregate scores
Source	Rating
Metacritic	66/100
Review scores
Source	Rating
Allmusic	2/5 stars
Billboard	Favorable
The Boston Globe	Favorable
Entertainment Weekly	B
Los Angeles Times	2.5/4 stars
The New York Times	Positive
Robert Christgau	(choice cut)
Rolling Stone	3/5 stars
Engine 145	3.5/5 stars
USA Today	3/4 stars

Southern Voice is the tenth studio album by American country music artist Tim McGraw. It was released on October 20, 2009, by Curb Records. It is the first album of all new material since Let It Go in 2007. The album produced three singles with "It's a Business Doing Pleasure with You", the title track, and "Still".

== History ==
McGraw was originally to have released his next album in 2008. To extend the term of the singer's recording contract, Curb Records instead released a third greatest hits package from the artist, only two years after his second greatest hits release – a move which the singer publicly criticized. The release of the album was finally announced on June 30, 2009. The announcement also stated that McGraw would begin an extensive tour in support of the album in early 2010.

== Singles ==
"It's a Business Doing Pleasure with You", written by Brett James and Nickelback lead vocalist Chad Kroeger, served as the album's lead-off single. It reached a peak of number 13 on the U.S. Billboard Hot Country Songs chart. The title-track was released in September 2009, as the second single, and "Still" as the third and final single.

== Track listing ==
No.	Title	Writer(s)	Length
1.	"Still"	Lee Brice; Kyle Jacobs; Joe Leathers	3:43
2.	"Ghost Town Train (She's Gone)"	Marv Green; Troy Olsen	3:49
3.	"Good Girls"	Chris Lindsey; Aimee Mayo; Brett Warren; Brad Warren	4:09
4.	"I Didn't Know It at the Time"	Lee Thomas Miller; Chris Stapleton	3:22
5.	"It's a Business Doing Pleasure with You"	Brett James; Chad Kroeger	3:07
6.	"If I Died Today"	Blair Daly; Brett Warren; Brad Warren	2:54
7.	"Mr. Whoever You Are"	Sean McConnell	4:23
8.	"Southern Voice"	Bob DiPiero; Tom Douglas	4:02
9.	"You Had to Be There"	Casey Beathard; Kenneth Wright	3:51
10.	"I'm Only Jesus"	Pat Buchanan; Brett Warren; Brad Warren	4:37
11.	"Forever Seventeen"	Joe Doyle; Josh Kear	4:34
12.	"Love You Goodbye"	Douglas; Jamie O'Hara	4:39

== Personnel ==
The following credits are sourced from liner notes included with the release.

- Tim McGraw – lead vocals (all tracks)

=== Musicians ===
- Strings on tracks 1, 7, 9, & 12 arranged and composed by David Campbell.

Tracks 1–11

- Jeff McMahon – acoustic piano, Wurlitzer electric piano, Hammond B3 organ, synthesizers
- Denny Hemingson – electric guitar, pedal steel guitar
- Bob Minner – acoustic guitar
- Darran Smith – electric guitar
- Deano Brown – fiddle, mandolin
- John Marcus – bass
- Billy Mason – drums
- David Dunkley – percussion, congas

Additional musicians on Track 5

- Jimmy Nichols – acoustic piano, Wurlitzer electric piano, Hammond B3 organ
- Byron Gallimore – electric guitar
- Brett Warren – harmonica

Track 12

- Jimmy Nichols – acoustic piano, synthesizers
- B. James Lowry – acoustic guitar
- Tom Bukovac – electric guitar
- Jerry McPherson – electric guitar
- Dan Dugmore – steel guitar
- Paul Bushnell – bass
- Shannon Forrest – drums

=== Backing vocals ===
- Greg Barnhill (tracks 1, 3, 6–8, 10, 11)
- Russell Terrell (tracks 2, 4, 5)
- Tim McGraw (track 11)

=== Production ===
- Missi Gallimore – A&R direction
- Byron Gallimore – producer, mixing
- Tim McGraw – producer, mixing
- Darran Smith – producer
- Julian King – tracking engineer
- Allen Sides – string engineer (1, 9)
- Steve Churchyard – string engineer (7, 12)
- Sara Lesher – additional engineer, Pro Tools engineer, mix assistant
- Erik Lutkins – additional engineer, Pro Tools engineer, mix assistant
- David Bryant – assistant engineer
- Colin Heldt – assistant engineer (1–11)
- Seth Morton – assistant engineer (12)
- Aaron Walk – assistant string engineer (1, 7, 9)
- Casey Lewis – assistant string engineer (12)
- Essential Sound Studio (Houston, Texas) – mixing location
- Hank Williams – mastering at MasterMix (Nashville, Tennessee)
- Kelly Clauge – creative director
- Nick Davidge – creative director
- Glenn Sweitzer – art direction, design
- Danny Clinch – photography

== Charts and certifications ==
=== Weekly charts ===
Chart (2009)	Peak position
Australian Albums (ARIA)	12
Australian Country Albums (ARIA)	3
Canadian Albums (Billboard)	7
US Billboard 200	2
US Top Country Albums (Billboard)	1

=== Year-end charts ===
Chart (2009)	Position
US Billboard 200	121
US Top Country Albums (Billboard)	27
Chart (2010)	Position
US Billboard 200	66
US Top Country Albums (Billboard)	9

=== Certifications ===
Region	Certification	Certified units/sales
Canada (Music Canada)	Gold	40,000^{^}
United States (RIAA)	Gold	500,000^{^}
^{^} Shipments figures based on certification alone.

=== Singles ===
Year	Single	Peak chart positions		
Year	Single	US Country	US	CAN
2009	"It's a Business Doing Pleasure with You"	13	59	53
2009	"Southern Voice"	1	49	58
2010	"Still"	16	91	94
