= Jerry Vandiver =

American songwriter and musician (born 1948)

- Born: Jerry Herbert Vandiver; August 12, 1948; Kansas City, Missouri, United States
- Genres: Americana, Folk, Country
- Occupations: Singer-songwriter, record producer, author
- Instruments: Vocals guitar
- Years active: 1968 – current
- Website: http://www.jerryvandiver.com

Jerry Herbert Vandiver is an American songwriter and musician. He has had two top ten singles and 5 charted singles on the Billboard Country charts. Vandiver's songs have been recorded by Tim McGraw, Gene Watson, Phil Vassar, Lonestar, The Oak Ridge Boys, Lee Greenwood, Barbara Mandrell, Dusty Drake and many others. Vandiver has RIAA Certified song credits on more than 15 million records. Two of Vandiver's songs, "It Doesn't Get Any Countrier Than This" and "For a Little While" (both recorded by Tim McGraw) are among the gold and platinum records on display at the Country Music Hall of Fame in Nashville, Tennessee.

== Chart singles written by Vandiver ==
The following is a list of Jerry Vandiver compositions that were chart hits.

Year	Single Title	Recording Artist	Chart Positions
Year	Single Title	Recording Artist	Billboard Country
1988	Don't Waste It on the Blues co-written with Sandy Ramos	Gene Watson	5
1989	Go Down Swingin co-written with Sandy Ramos	Wild Rose	38
1992	Before I'm Ever Over You co-written with Sandy Ramos	Lee Greenwood	73
1998	For a Little While co-written with Steve Mandile, and Phil Vassar	Tim McGraw	2

== Recordings produced by Vandiver ==
- 2001: "Don't Try This At Home" – Jerry Vandiver
- 2012: "True and Deep – Songs for the Heart of the Paddler" – Jerry Vandiver
- 2012: "Interwoven Roots" – Shy-Anne Hovorka
- 2012: "I Wrote This One For You" – Jerry Vandiver
- 2014: "Every Scratch Tells A Story" – Jerry Vandiver
- 2016: "Mixed Dry Bag" – Jerry Vandiver

== Books written by Vandiver ==
In the fall of 2002, Vandiver and co-writer Gracie Hollombe released a self-help text for songwriters entitled "Your First Cut: A Step-by-Step Guide to Getting There"
