= Southern Voice (song) =

Single by Tim McGraw

from the album Southern Voice
- Released: September 21, 2009
- Genre: Country
- Length: 4:02
- Label: Curb
- Songwriters: Bob DiPiero; Tom Douglas
- Producers: Byron Gallimore; Tim McGraw; Darran Smith

Tim McGraw singles chronology
| "It's a Business Doing Pleasure with You" (2009) | "Southern Voice" (2009) | "Still" (2010) |

"Southern Voice" is a song written by Bob DiPiero and Tom Douglas and recorded by American country music artist Tim McGraw. It was released in September 2009 as the second single and title track from McGraw's 2009 album of the same name. For the week dated January 30, 2010, the song reached Number One on the U.S. Billboard Hot Country Songs chart, becoming his 23rd number one hit and his first since "Last Dollar (Fly Away)" in April 2007.

== Content ==
This song is an up-tempo track that lists various influential natives of the Southern United States, who all embody a "southern voice." Many are referred to, not by full name but direct allusion, including civil rights leader Martin Luther King Jr. ("Dr. King") and NASCAR driver Dale Earnhardt ("Number Three").

Regarding the song, McGraw told Great American Country, "I hope it’s a record that you can put on and just sort of melt into. And that’s what the purpose was for it. We wanted a sort of earthiness that when you put this thing on, it just sort of kicks out all over you."

== Music video ==
The video was directed by Sherman Halsey, McGraw's usual director of choice. It premiered on CMT on October 2, 2009 and was ranked No. 33 on GAC's Top 50 Videos of the Year 2009. It was filmed on East Main St. in Watertown, Tn.

== Critical reception ==
Matt Bjorke of Roughstock criticized the song's lyrics, saying, "one can’t help but think of the song as but another laundry list of things that quantify why something is or isn’t great," but adding that McGraw's vocal and the "catchy chorus" "save 'Southern Voice' from the scrap-heap." Country Universe reviewer Kevin J. Coyne gave the song a B rating, saying, "collectively, the people he mentions do indeed rule, making this a reasonable exercise in regional pride."

== In popular culture ==
"Southern Voice" is one of the songs played over the end credits of the film The Blind Side, which co-stars McGraw.

== Notable Performances ==
McGraw performed the song on the Late Show with David Letterman on October 12, 2009.

== Chart performance ==
On the week ending November 7, 2009, "Southern Voice" debuted on the Billboard Hot 100 at number 61 and at No. 49 on the U.S. Billboard Hot Country Songs chart in September 2009. Later on Hot Country Songs, for the week of January 30, 2010, the song became McGraw's 23rd number one hit and his first since "Last Dollar (Fly Away)", which topped the chart dated April 14, 2007.

| Chart (2009–2010) | Peak position |
|---|---|
| US Hot Country Songs (Billboard) | 1 |
| US Billboard Hot 100 | 49 |
| Canada Country (Billboard) | 1 |
| Canada Hot 100 (Billboard) | 58 |

=== Year-end charts ===
| Chart (2010) | Position |
|---|---|
| US Country Songs (Billboard) | 43 |

== Certifications ==
| Region | Certification | Certified units/sales |
|---|---|---|
| United States (RIAA) | Platinum | 1,000,000^{‡} |
^{‡} Sales+streaming figures based on certification alone.
