= Where the Green Grass Grows =

Single by Tim McGraw

from the album Everywhere
- Released: July 13, 1998
- Genre: Country
- Length: 3:21
- Label: Curb
- Songwriters: Jess Leary; Craig Wiseman
- Producers: Byron Gallimore; Tim McGraw; James Stroud

Tim McGraw singles chronology
| "Just to Hear You Say That You Love Me" (1998) | "Where the Green Grass Grows" (1998) | "For a Little While" (1998) |

"Where the Green Grass Grows" is a song written by Jess Leary and Craig Wiseman, and recorded by American country music artist Tim McGraw. It was released on July 13, 1998, as the fifth single from McGraw's Everywhere album. The song reached number one on the Billboard Hot Country Singles & Tracks (now Hot Country Songs) chart and peaked at number seventy-nine on the Hot 100. It also reached number one on the Canadian RPM Country Tracks chart.

== Content ==
The song tells the story of a man leaving the big city by going back out into the country.

The song is referenced and sampled in McGraw's 2021 single, "7500 OBO".

== Critical reception ==
Kevin John Coyne of Country Universe gave the song an A grade, saying it is "tightly produced, with an instantly recognizable opening fiddle." He went on to say that the lyrics are "cleverly constructed" and "brilliantly contrasted."

== Chart performance ==
| Chart (1998) | Peak position |
|---|---|
| Canada Country Singles (RPM) | 1 |
| US Billboard Hot 100 | 79 |
| US Hot Country Songs (Billboard) | 1 |

=== Year-end charts ===
| Chart (1998) | Position |
|---|---|
| Canada Country Tracks (RPM) | 26 |
| US Country Songs (Billboard) | 17 |

== Certifications ==
Certifications for Where the Green Grass Grows
| Region | Certification | Certified units/sales |
|---|---|---|
| United States (RIAA) | 2× Platinum | 2,000,000^{‡} |
^{‡} Sales+streaming figures based on certification alone.

== Parodies ==
- American country music parody artist Cledus T. Judd released a parody of "Where the Green Grass Grows" titled "Where the Grass Don't Grow" on his 1999 album Juddmental.
