= Just to See You Smile =

Single by Tim McGraw

from the album Everywhere
- B-side: "One of These Days"
- Released: August 9, 1997
- Recorded: 1997
- Genre: Neotraditional country
- Length: 3:35
- Label: Curb
- Songwriters: Mark Nesler; Tony Martin
- Producers: Byron Gallimore; Tim McGraw; James Stroud

Tim McGraw singles chronology
"Everywhere" (1997)	"Just to See You Smile" (1997)	"One of These Days" (1998)

"Just to See You Smile" is a song written by Mark Nesler and Tony Martin, and recorded by American country music artist Tim McGraw. It was released in August 1997 as the third single from McGraw's fourth studio album Everywhere. Having spent 42 weeks on the Billboard chart, it set what was then a record for being the longest-running single on the Billboard country chart since the inception of Nielsen SoundScan in 1990. It was also the longest chart run for any country single in the 1990s. The song was also released by Mitchell Tenpenny in 2018.

== Critical reception ==
Kevin John Coyne of Country Universe gave the song an A grade, saying McGraw "plays his cards so close to his chest that upon first listen, you may only pick up on his unconditional love and selflessness toward the girl who’s been stringing him along for all these years."

== Track listing ==
Single

1. Just To See You Smile 3:34
2. Everywhere 4:50

== Chart performance ==
"Just to See You Smile" debuted in August 1997 and surged in November. It became McGraw's third consecutive No. 1 single from Everywhere and his seventh overall, spending six weeks atop the Billboard magazine Hot Country Singles & Tracks chart in January and February 1998. It was also McGraw's second single to be declared by Billboard as the Number One country single of the year.

== Chart history ==
Chart (1997–1998)	Peak position
Canada Country Singles (RPM)	1
US Hot Country Songs (Billboard)	1

=== Year-end charts ===
Chart (1998)	Position
Canada Country Tracks (RPM)	28
US Country Songs (Billboard)	1

== Certifications ==
Region	Certification	Certified units/sales
United States (RIAA)	2× Platinum	2,000,000^{‡}
^{‡} Sales+streaming figures based on certification alone.
