= Marcus Hummon =

American country music artist

- Born: Marcus Spencer Hummon; December 28, 1960 (age 65)
- Origin: Washington, DC, U.S.
- Genre: Country
- Occupation: Singer-songwriter
- Instruments: Vocals, guitar, harmonica, mandolin, piano
- Years active: 1994–present
- Labels: Columbia, Velvet Armadillo
- Website: www.marcushummon.net

Marcus Spencer Hummon (born December 28, 1960) is an American country music singer-songwriter. Notable songs written or co-written by Hummon include "Ready to Run" and "Cowboy Take Me Away", recorded by The Chicks; "Born to Fly", recorded by Sara Evans; "Only Love", recorded by Wynonna Judd; "The Cheap Seats", recorded by Alabama; "Pilgrims on the Way", recorded by Michael Martin Murphey; "One of These Days", recorded by Tim McGraw; "Cornfields or Cadillacs", recorded by Farmer's Daughter; "Love Is the Right Place", recorded by Bryan White; and "Bless the Broken Road", recorded by Nitty Gritty Dirt Band as well as Rascal Flatts. Three of these songs reached number one on the country record charts: "Cowboy Take Me Away", "Born to Fly", and the Rascal Flatts version of "Bless the Broken Road". Hummon has also scored films and written operas and musicals.

== Biography ==
=== Early life ===
Hummon was born in Washington, D.C. His father worked for the United States Department of State and the United States Agency for International Development and he spent much of his childhood in Africa, Italy, Tanzania, Nigeria, the Philippines, and Saudi Arabia. He sang in church as a child and his first performance as a musician was playing African drums on Nigerian TV. He moved back to the Washington metropolitan area as a junior in high school, living in Potomac, Maryland and Bethesda, Maryland. His parents were musicians and theatre buffs and exposed him to the arts, regularly attending performances. As a teen, he played in a group with his three sisters. He attended Bullis School, where he played running back and graduated in 1980. He graduated from Williams College in 1984.

=== Career ===
Following college, in 1984, he moved to Los Angeles to seek a recording contract but was unsuccessful. In 1986, Hummon moved to Nashville. He played at the Bluebird Café and other clubs. He was eventually signed to a songwriting contract and then a recording contract with Columbia Records. Hummon met Joe Henry, who collaborated with John Denver, and offered to help him write songs. The first notable song that he wrote was "Pilgrims on the Way", recorded by Michael Martin Murphey in 1988.

His debut album All in Good Time (1995) included the song "God's Country", which reached number 73 on the Hot Country Songs record charts. It also included "Bless the Broken Road", with backing vocals by co-writer Jeff Hanna and Matraca Berg and "One of These Days". The songs and title of the album reference his Christian faith. From 1999 to 2001, Hummon was a member of the alternative country band The Raphaels along with former Big Country lyricist and guitarist Stuart Adamson. The Raphaels' only release was "Supernatural" in 1998 on Track Records. In 1997, Hummon formed his own label, Velvet Armadillo, on which he released several studio albums.

In 1998, "Bless the Broken Road" was recorded by Melodie Crittenden; this version charted on the Hot Country Songs record chart. In 2004, "Bless the Broken Road" was recorded by Rascal Flatts; this version won a Grammy Award for Best Country Song. In 2006, Selah recorded the song and it charted on the Hot Christian Songs chart.

In 2009, Hummon's first book, Anytime, Anywhere: A Little Boy’s Prayer, a children's book, was published by Simon & Schuster.

Hummon wrote Surrender Road, an opera staged by The Nashville Opera Company in 2005. Another opera, Favorite Son, produced with the Nashville Opera in February 2022, featuring Darrel Scott and John Riesen was nominated for a Regional Emmy for musical composition.

Hummon also wrote six musicals, three of which were featured as part of the New York Musical Theatre Festival in 2005, 2006 and 2011. His musical American Prophet, about the life of Frederick Douglass, co-written with Charles Randolph-Wright, premiered at the Arena Stage in Washington, D.C. in August 2022 and won the Edgerton Award that year.

In 2012 and 2014, Hummon performed at the Greenbelt Festival.

In August 2014, he signed a publishing deal with CTM Writers INK.

Hummon has scored two films: Lost Boy Home and The Last Songwriter, a documentary that he co-produced featuring Garth Brooks and Jason Isbell, which won the Audience Award at the Nashville Film Festival in 2017.

In 2019, Hummon was inducted to the Nashville Songwriters Hall of Fame.

In March 2020, he signed a publishing deal with LBK Entertainment.

== Personal life ==
Hummon is married to Reverend Becca Stevens, an Episcopal priest and chaplain, speaker, and author of eight books. They have 3 children, including country singer Levi Hummon and live in Nashville.

== List of singles composed by Marcus Hummon ==
Songs written by Hummon that were recorded by other notable artists include:

- Michael Martin Murphey - "Pilgrims on the Way" (1988)
- Wynonna Judd – "Only Love" (1993)
- Hal Ketchum – "Every Little Word" (1994)
- Western Flyer – "Friday Night Stampede" (1994)
- Alabama – "The Cheap Seats" (1994)
- Suzy Bogguss – "No Way Out" (1996)
- Farmer's Daughter - "Cornfields or Cadillacs" (1996)
- Bryan White – "Love Is the Right Place" (1997)
- Tim McGraw – "One of These Days" (1998)
- Steve Wariner – "Road Trippin'" (1998)
- Dixie Chicks – "Ready to Run" (1999), "Cowboy Take Me Away" (1999)
- Sara Evans – "Born to Fly" (2000)
- Chely Wright – "Jezebel" (2001)
- Sherrié Austin - "In Our Own Sweet Time" (2001)
- SHeDAISY – "Get Over Yourself" (2002)
- Lauren Lucas – "What You Ain't Gonna Get" (2005)
- Ty Herndon - "Love Revival" (2006)
- One Flew South – "My Kind of Beautiful" (2008)
- Jessica Harp - "Follow That Train" (2010)
- The JaneDear girls - "Never Gonna Let You Go" (2011)
- Danny Gokey - "One Life" (2014)
- Joel Crouse - "Oh Juliet" (2014)
- Runaway June - "Blue Roses" (2019)

== Discography ==
=== Albums ===
| Title | Album details |
|---|---|
| All in Good Time | Release date: September 5, 1995; Label: Columbia Records |
| The Sound of One Fan Clapping | Release date: April 4, 1997; Label: Velvet Armadillo Records |
| Looking for the Child | Release date: August 20, 1999; Label: Velvet Armadillo Records |
| Francis of Guernica | Release date: March 19, 2001; Label: Velvet Armadillo Records |
| Warrior | Release date: September 25, 2001; Label: Velvet Armadillo Records |
| American Duet | Release date: January 15, 2003; Label: Velvet Armadillo Records |
| Revolution EP | Release date: October 15, 2003; Label: Velvet Armadillo Records |
| Atlanta | Release date: March 1, 2005; Label: Velvet Armadillo Records |
| Nowhere to Go but Up | Release date: April 27, 2005; Label: Velvet Armadillo Records |
| Surrender Road | Release date: December 21, 2005; Label: Velvet Armadillo Records |
| Rosanna | Release date: May 1, 2010; Label: self-released |

=== Singles ===
| Year | Single | Peak positions | Album |
| Year | Single | US Country | Album |
|---|---|---|---|
| 1996 | "God's Country" | 73 | All in Good Time |
| 1996 | "Honky Tonk Mona Lisa" | — | All in Good Time |
| 2005 | "Revolution" | — | single only |
"—" denotes releases that did not chart

=== Music videos ===
| Year | Video | Director |
|---|---|---|
| 1996 | "Honky Tonk Mona Lisa" | R. Brad Murano |
