= It's a Business Doing Pleasure with You =

Single by Tim McGraw

from the album Southern Voice
- Released: June 29, 2009
- Genre: Country
- Length: 3:07
- Label: Curb
- Songwriters: Brett James; Chad Kroeger
- Producers: Byron Gallimore; Tim McGraw; Darran Smith

Tim McGraw singles chronology
"Nothin' to Die For" (2009)	"It's a Business Doing Pleasure with You" (2009)	"Southern Voice" (2009)

"It's a Business Doing Pleasure with You" is a song written by Nickelback frontman Chad Kroeger and country musician Brett James, and recorded by American country music artist Tim McGraw. The song is the first single to his tenth studio album, Southern Voice. It is also McGraw's fifty-second chart entry on the Billboard country charts. The song was released to radio on June 29, 2009.

== Content ==
The song's narrator is frustrated with buying items for his lover, telling her that "it's a business doing pleasure with [her]". The song's title is an inversion of the phrase "It's a pleasure doing business with you."

== Chart performance ==
"It's a Business Doing Pleasure with You" debuted at number 35 on the U.S. Billboard Hot Country Songs chart in July 2009, and reached a peak of number 13 on the chart in September 2009.

Chart (2009)	Peak position
US Hot Country Songs (Billboard)	13
US Billboard Hot 100	59
Canada Country (Billboard)	3
Canada Hot 100 (Billboard)	53
