= Jumpin' Gene Simmons =

American rockabilly singer (1937–2006)

- Born: Morris Eugene Simmons; July 10, 1937; Itawamba County, Mississippi, U.S.
- Origin: Tupelo, Mississippi, U.S.
- Died: August 29, 2006 (aged 69)
- Genres: Rock and roll; pop; rockabilly; country
- Occupations: Singer, songwriter
- Instrument: Vocals
- Years active: 1956–2006
- Labels: Sun; Hi

Morris Eugene Simmons (July 10, 1937 – August 29, 2006), better known as Jumpin' Gene Simmons, was an American singer and songwriter best known for his 1964 novelty single "Haunted House".

== Biography ==
Gene Simmons was born in Itawamba County, Mississippi, and began his recording career with Sun Records in 1956 a couple of years after performing as an opening act for former labelmate Elvis Presley. However, the label released only one (non-charting) single from his recording sessions. His first and only Top 40 hit was "Haunted House", a cover of a 1958 recording by Johnny Fuller, which peaked at No. 11 on the Billboard Hot 100 in 1964 and No. 7 in Canada. The song represented one of Hi Records' early successes. The track was later covered by the Compton Brothers, Jerry Lee Lewis, Ace Cannon, Hasil Adkins, Sam the Sham, John Fogerty, and John Anderson. His last work was "Indian Outlaw," which he co-wrote, and was a hit for country music artist Tim McGraw in 1994.

Simmons' Hi Records recordings were released as an anthology, Haunted House: The Complete Jumpin' Gene Simmons on Hi Records, in June 2001. Sun Records followed suit in December 2006 with the 33-song collection Drinkin' Wine: The Sun Years, Plus. He had recorded several albums with both labels but they were never released. In late 1962, he travelled to Mexico to appear as a diver in Paramount's Fun in Acapulco, starring Elvis Presley who, incidentally, could not travel there as he was persona non grata.

Brian Setzer covered one of Simmons' singles, "Peroxide Blonde in a Hopped Up Model Ford," for his 2005 album Rockabilly Riot, Vol. 1: A Tribute to Sun Records. A year later, on August 29, 2006, the 42nd anniversary of the entry of "Haunted House" into the top 40, Simmons died after a long illness at age 69 in his hometown.

Kiss bassist Gene Simmons chose his stage name as a tribute to the singer.

== Discography ==
- Jumpin' Gene Simmons (1964)
- Goin' Back to Memphis (1987)
- 706 Union Ave. And Beyond (1998)
- Haunted House: The Complete Jumpin' Gene Simmons on Hi Records (2001)
- Drinkin' Wine: The Sun Years, Plus (2006)
