= Stan Munsey =

American songwriter

Stan E. Munsey (born July 10, 1955) is an American songwriter and one of several writer-musicians to emerge from the Muscle Shoals, Alabama music scene.

== Biography ==
Munsey was born in Easton, Pennsylvania on July 10, 1955, and spent a significant number of his early years in Sheffield, Alabama.

He is best known as a musician and songwriter, with songs on major recordings that have sold more than 12 million worldwide, and has penned tunes for Alabama, Shenandoah, The Statler Brothers, Glen Campbell, Shania Twain, Tim McGraw, The Kinleys, Butch Baker, Lorrie Morgan, Suzy Bogguss, Barbara Mandrell, Lee Greenwood, Jonathan Edwards, Mel McDaniel, Charly McClain, Wayne Massey, Ty Herndon, Collin Raye, John Michael Montgomery, Marty Raybon, and Marie Osmond.

As a musician, the first band Munsey recorded with was "The Chessmen", who released a single on the Paradox records label which got modest radio airplay in 1970. He played keys with numerous bands and artists throughout the seventies and shared his talents with the likes of Percy Sledge and Jim Stafford before making his mark in Nashville, Tennessee as a songwriter.

Munsey took some time off from his songwriting to tour with Los Angeles-based Wendy Waldman on Dan Fogelberg's Exile tour. He later signed with Charley Pride's publishing company where he penned songs for Lorrie Morgan and Tim McGraw. Munsey scored big with the McGraw single and title cut of the CD, "All I Want Is a Life", which reached the top of the Billboard Country charts in 1995 and earned him a BMI Million-Air award. He was the keyboardist for Grammy Award-winning country music group Shenandoah, having joined during the 1990s, until his departure in 2018.
