= Don't Take the Girl =

Single by Tim McGraw

from the album Not a Moment Too Soon
- B-side: "Welcome to the Club"
- Released: March 28, 1994
- Recorded: 1993
- Genre: Country
- Length: 4:09
- Label: Curb
- Songwriters: Craig Martin; Larry W. Johnson
- Producers: Byron Gallimore; James Stroud

Tim McGraw singles chronology
"Indian Outlaw" (1994)	"Don't Take the Girl" (1994)	"Down on the Farm" (1994)

"Don't Take The Girl" is a song written by Craig Martin and Larry W. Johnson, and recorded by the American country music artist Tim McGraw. It was released in March 1994 as the second single from his album Not a Moment Too Soon. It was McGraw's fifth single overall, and his first number-one single on the Hot Country Songs chart. It also reached number one on the Canadian country charts and it was a successful pop song, reaching number 17 on the Billboard Hot 100.

== Content ==
The song tells the story of two young lovers dealing with difficult scenarios at three different stages in their lives. In each situation, the man does all he can to make sure that different entities "don't take the girl".

In the first verse, the young man (Johnny) is eight years old, about to go on a fishing trip with his father. A young, unnamed girl, apparently Johnny's age, is also present, with a fishing pole in her hand. Johnny does not want the girl to come fishing with them. So he begs his father to "take any boy in the world / Daddy, please, don't take the girl".

In the second verse, they are ten years later. They have fallen in love and are dating. On a date at the "picture show" (i.e., the movie theater), the couple are held up at gunpoint. The man grabs the girl's arm and tells Johnny to give in to his demands. Johnny surrenders his money, wallet, credit cards, a watch that his grandfather gave him, and even his car keys so that the girl would be safe (in the music video, the crook is seen running away with only the wallet).

Verse three takes place five years later. Johnny and the girl are now expecting their first child, and she is eventually rushed to the hospital to have her baby delivered. The baby, a boy, is safely delivered, but the doctor informs Johnny that his wife is "fading fast". Johnny collapses to his knees and prays to God that his wife survives, even asking that his own life be taken instead of hers, as long as she is okay.

The song ends with a repeat of the song's opening line: "Johnny's daddy was taking him fishin' when he was eight years old".

Though the song leaves the wife's fate ambiguous, the music video reveals she survived her medical crisis and is seen in the end going fishing with her husband and their son, Johnny Jr.

== Cover version ==
The song was recorded by Brett Young on his 2023 album Across the Sheets.

== Critical reception ==
Deborah Evans Price, of Billboard magazine reviewed the song favorably, writing that it had the listeners "crying in their beer in the dancehalls down in Texas". She continues, that once radio has it, the song will take off.

The southern sports personality, Brandon Walker, included the song as his top country hit of the 1990s.

== Charts and certifications ==
"Don't Take the Girl" debuted at number 71 on the U.S. Billboard Hot Country Singles & Tracks for the week of April 2, 1994.

=== Peak positions ===
Chart (1994)	Peak position
Canada Country Singles (RPM)	1
US Billboard Hot 100	17
US Hot Country Songs (Billboard)	1

==== End of year charts ====
Chart (1994)	Position
Canada Country Tracks (RPM)	67
US Billboard Hot 100	87
US Country Songs (Billboard)	30

=== Certifications ===
Region	Certification	Certified units/sales
United States (RIAA) (physical)	Gold	700,000
United States (RIAA) (digital)	3× Platinum	3,000,000^{‡}
^{‡} Sales+streaming figures based on certification alone.

== Parodies ==
- The country music parodist Cledus T. Judd recorded a parody of the song, called "Please Take the Girl", on his 1995 debut album Cledus T. Judd (No Relation).
