= Joe Barnhill =

American country music singer-songwriter

- Born: June 13, 1965 (age 60)
- Origin: Turkey, Texas, US
- Genres: Country
- Occupation: Singer-songwriter
- Instrument: Vocals
- Years active: 1989–1997, 2012
- Labels: Universal, Capitol, Avion

Joe Barnhill (born June 13, 1965, in Turkey, Texas) is an American country music singer-songwriter. Between 1990 and 1997, Barnhill released 2 studio albums. He also charted two singles on the Billboard Hot Country Singles & Tracks chart. His highest charting single, "Your Old Flame's Goin' Out Tonite," peaked at No. 56 in 1989.

His self-titled debut album was praised by one critic for its "excellent" selections of songs including a cover of Paul Overstreet's "Becky Morgan (Cotton Pickin' Time)".

As a songwriter, Barnhill along with Wayne Perry wrote "Not a Moment Too Soon," a No. 1 hit for Tim McGraw in 1994.

== Discography ==
=== Albums ===
Title	Album details
Joe Barnhill	Release date: April 23, 1990; Label: Capitol Records
America's Musical Highway	Release date: September 23, 1997; Label: Avion Records

=== Singles ===
Year	Single	Peak chart positions		Album
Year	Single	US Country	CAN Country	Album
1989	"Becky Morgan (Cotton Pickin' Time)"	—	—	Joe Barnhill
1989	"Your Old Flame's Goin' Out Tonite"	56	75	Joe Barnhill
1989	"Good as Gone"	57	—	Joe Barnhill
1990	"Any Ole Time"	—^{A}	—	Joe Barnhill
"—" denotes releases that did not chart

Notes:

- ^{A} "Any Ole Time" did not chart on Hot Country Songs, but peaked at No. 8 on Hot Country Radio Breakouts.
