= Sherman Halsey =

- Born: Sherman Brooks Halsey; February 22, 1957; Independence, Kansas, U.S.
- Died: October 29, 2013 (aged 56); Nashville, Tennessee, U.S.
- Occupations: Director, producer, artist manager
- Parent: Jim Halsey (father)

Sherman Brooks Halsey (February 22, 1957 – October 29, 2013) was an American music video and television director, producer, and artist manager. Sherman Halsey produced and directed hundreds of television shows and music videos for artists such as Tim McGraw, Brooks and Dunn, Alan Jackson, B. B. King, Michael Bolton and Dwight Yoakam.

== Career ==
After college, Halsey split his time between the Agency, Management and Record Company division headquartered in Tulsa, and their Beverly Hills office where he and Dick Howard developed the television production arm of the Jim Halsey Company. As vice chairman of the Jim Halsey Company, the largest agency in country music in the world at that time, he was involved in all aspects of the artists' careers. The Jim Halsey Company represented 47 of country music's top stars, Roy Clark, The Oak Ridge Boys, The Bellamy Brothers, The Judds, Waylon Jennings, Reba McEntire, Merle Haggard, Roy Orbison and many others. Halsey was vice chairman of the Jim Halsey Company from 1980 to 1990 when the Halseys sold the Agency division to William Morris. The Halseys maintained ownership of the Management and Production divisions of the company.

Halsey discovered and managed an unknown Dwight Yoakam. Drawing upon his directing talent, Halsey combined his management and marketing skills to design and implement a plan which would develop Yoakam's career through the newly emerging video market. As Yoakam's manager, he produced and directed numerous music videos for Yoakam including one of the first big budget music videos, “Honky Tonk Man”. Halsey also worked as manager of the group The Clark Family Experience. He discovered them after seeing a videotape of one of their performances, but with no contact information on the tape, it took him six months to find them. He asked them if they wanted to open for Tim McGraw, and got them signed to Curb Records, within a few weeks of meeting them.

Halsey became a prolific music video director, especially for Tim McGraw. Regarding their work together, McGraw said in an interview, ""Sherman has documented pretty much everything and almost all the videos I've done." McGraw delayed plans for a television network special, eventually titled, Tim McGraw: Sing Me Home, until he could be assured that Halsey would direct the special.

== Personal life ==
Halsey was the son of artist manager, agent, and impresario Jim Halsey.

== Death ==
Halsey died on October 29, 2013, at his Nashville home. He was 56. Funeral services for Halsey were conducted November 5, 2013, at Memorial Hall, Independence, Kansas and were attended by approximately 400 people as well as family. Roy Clark, The Oak Ridge Boys, and Tim McGraw attended the services. Jana Jae played a violin farewell and Leon Russell sent a videotape tribute. A eulogy was delivered by his father, Jim Halsey and another was delivered by his sister, Gina.

== Filmography ==
=== Television shows ===
Season	Title	Involvement	Network
1982–1983	"Country Music USA"	Associate Producer	HBO Entertainment
1987–1988	"Country Music – A New Tradition"	Director; Producer	Cinemax
1997–1999	"The Oak Ridge Boys From Las Vegas"	Creator; Producer; Executive Producer	The Nashville Network (TNN)
2002–2003	"Tim McGraw: Sing Me Home"	Director; Producer	NBC Entertainment, Primetime Special
2004–2005	"Tim McGraw: Here and Now"	Director; Co-Producer	NBC Entertainment, Primetime Special
2005–2006	"Tim McGraw: Reflected"	Director; Producer	NBC Entertainment, Primetime Special
