= The Voice (American TV series) season 8 =

The Voice
- Season 8
- Promotional poster featuring coaches Shelton, Williams, Aguilera, and Levine
- Hosted by: Carson Daly
- Coaches: Adam Levine; Pharrell Williams; Christina Aguilera; Blake Shelton
- No. of contestants: 48 artists
- Winner: Sawyer Fredericks
- Winning coach: Pharrell Williams
- Runner-up: Meghan Linsey

Release
- Original network: NBC
- Original release: February 23 – May 19, 2015

Season chronology
- ← Previous; Season 7 Next → Season 9

The eighth season of the American reality talent show The Voice premiered on February 23, 2015, on NBC. Adam Levine, Blake Shelton, & Pharrell Williams returned as coaches. Christina Aguilera returned for her fifth season as coach after a two-season absence, replacing Gwen Stefani. Carson Daly returned as host for the eighth season.

Sawyer Fredericks was named the winner of the season, marking Pharrell Williams' first win as a coach. For the first time in The Voice history, out of 4 finalists, 3 of them were stolen artists. (Meghan Linsey is originally from Pharrell Williams, placing runner-up, Joshua Davis from Blake Shelton, placing 3rd, and Koryn Hawthorne from Christina Aguilera, placing 4th)

== Coaches and hosts ==
Christina Aguilera re-joined the show after two seasons of absence, joining Blake Shelton, Adam Levine, and Pharrell Williams. The advisors for this season included Lionel Richie for Team Pharrell, Meghan Trainor for Team Blake, Nick Jonas for Team Christina, and Ellie Goulding for Team Adam. Nate Ruess served as an advisor for all teams during the Knockouts.

Coaches and Host of The Voice Season 8

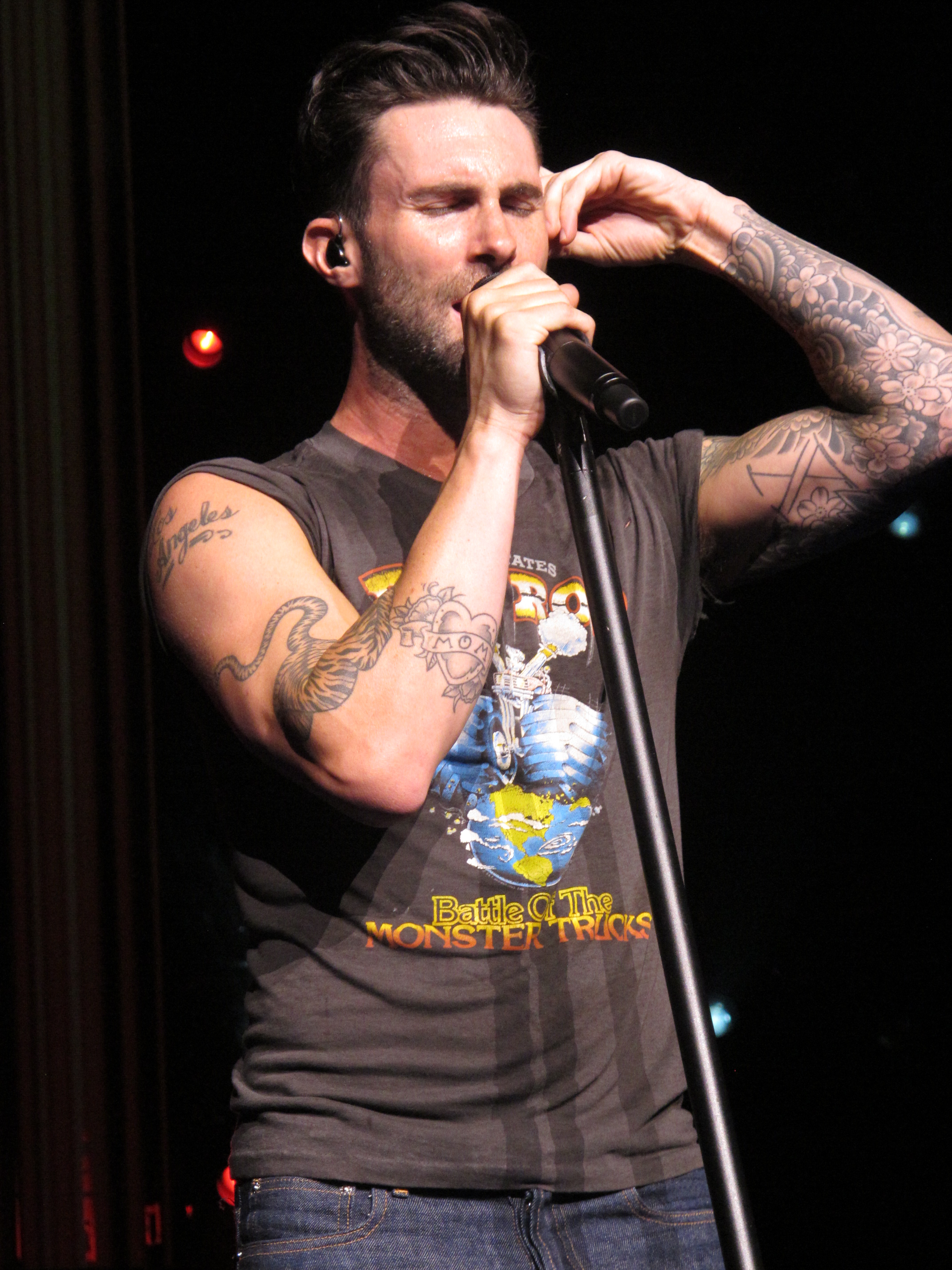
Adam Levine

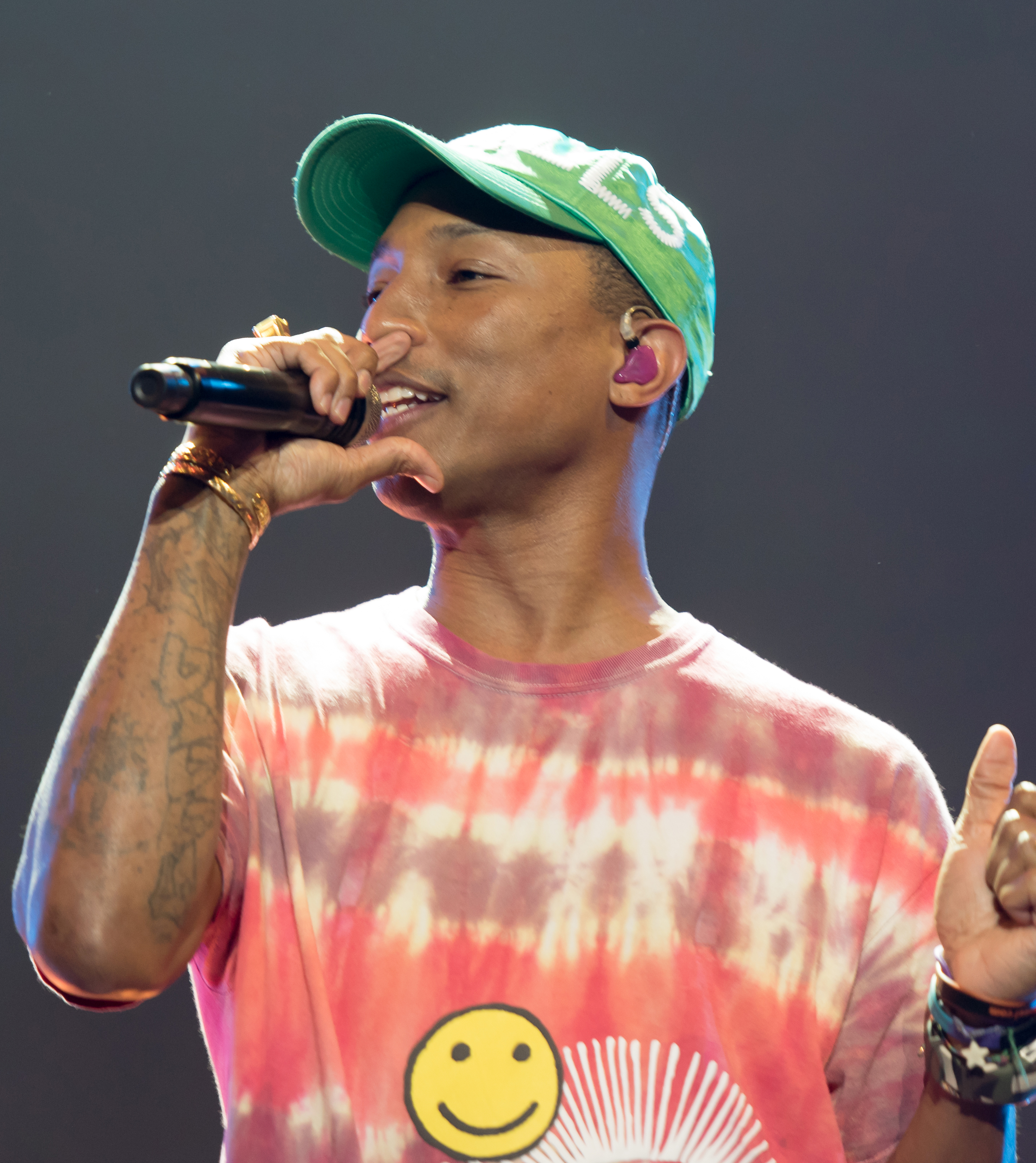
Pharrell Williams

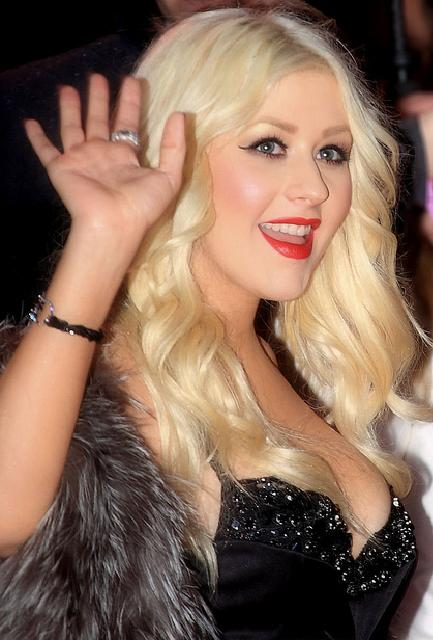
Christina Aguilera

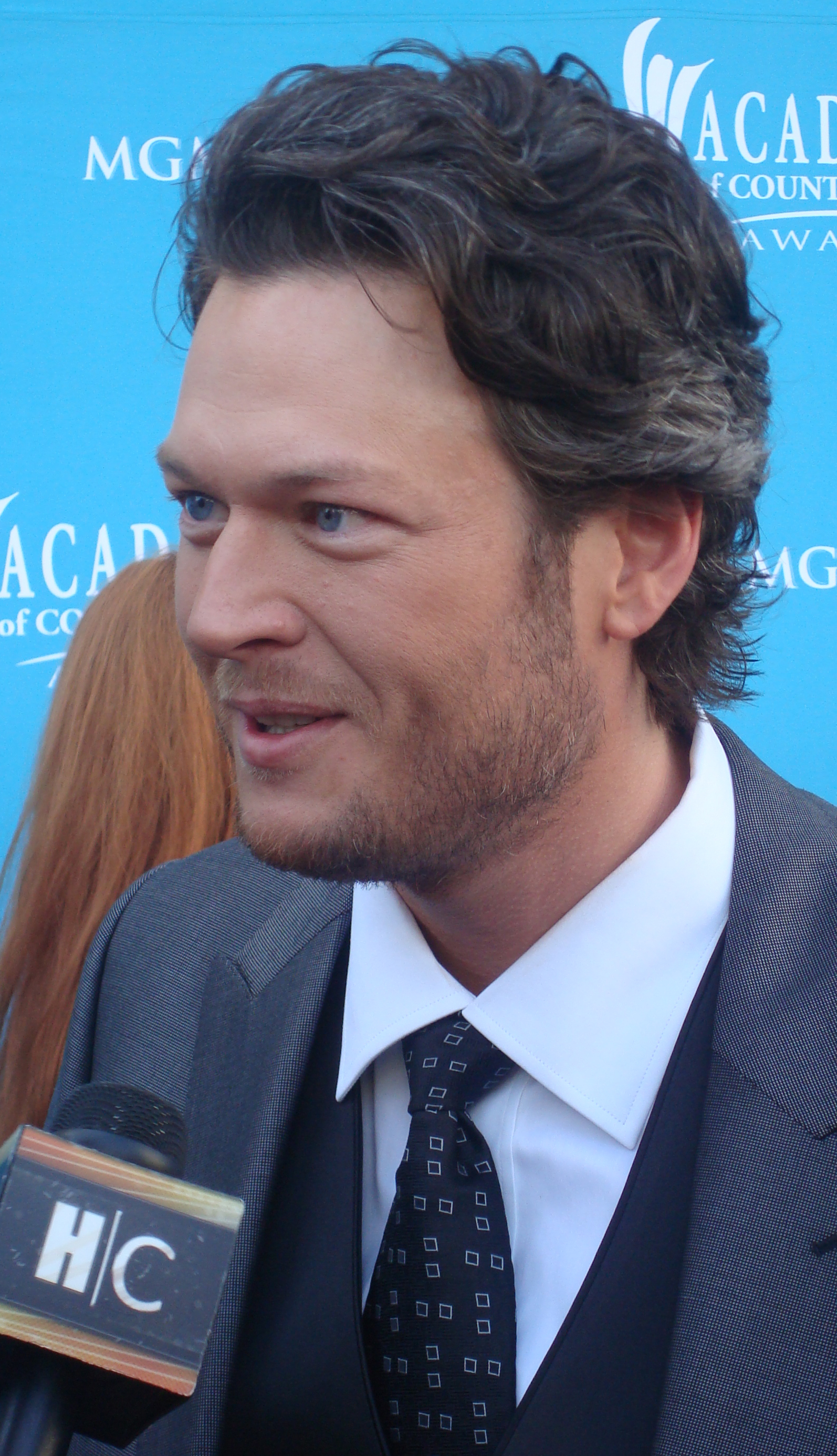
Blake Shelton

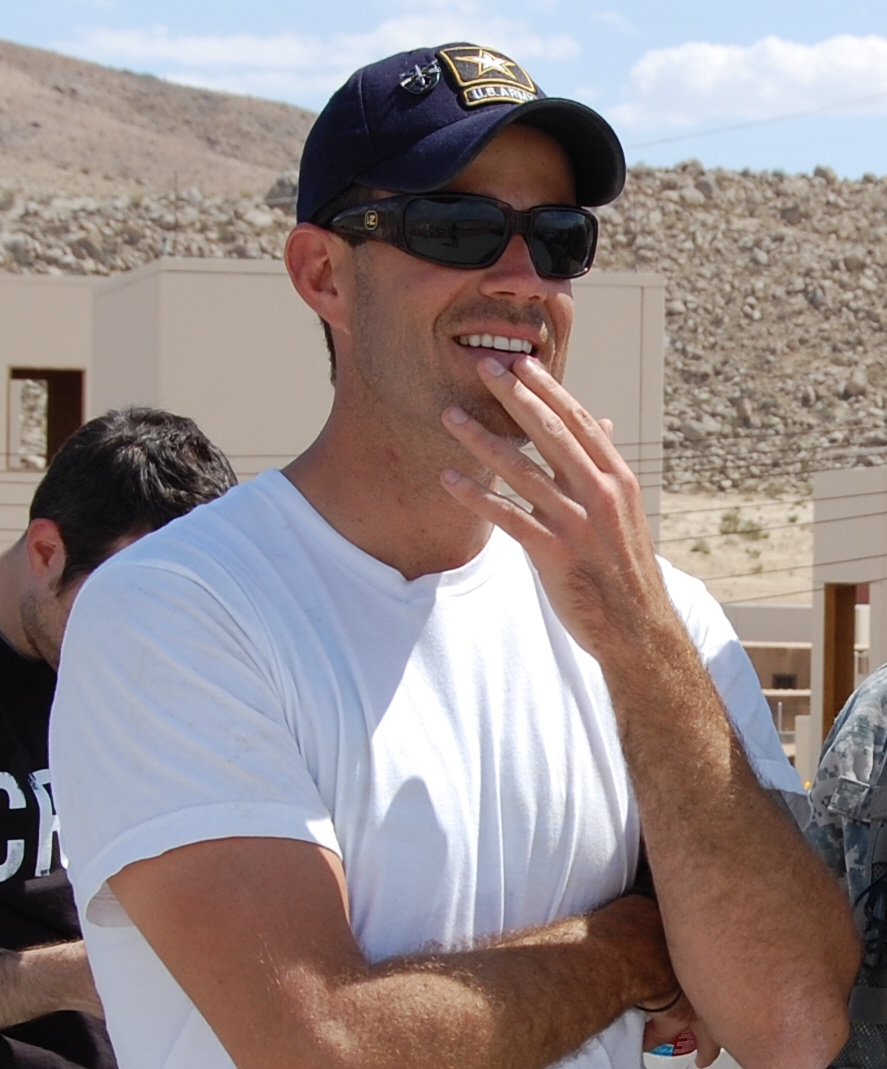
Carson Daly

== Teams ==
Color key

- Winner
- Runner-up
- Third place
- Fourth place
- Eliminated in Live shows
- Eliminated in Live playoffs
- Stolen in the Knockouts
- Eliminated in the Knockouts
- Stolen in the Battles
- Eliminated in the Battles
- Withdrew

Coaches	Top 48 artists				
Adam Levine					
Adam Levine	Joshua Davis	Deanna Johnson	Brian Johnson	Tonya Boyd-Cannon	Nathan Hermida
Adam Levine	~~Lexi Dávila~~	Blaze Johnson	Barry Minniefield	Clinton Washington	Josh Batstone
Adam Levine	Bren'nae DeBarge	Jack Gregori	Michael Leier	Nicolette Maré	James McNeiece
Pharrell Williams					
Pharrell Williams	Sawyer Fredericks	Koryn Hawthorne	Mia Zanotti	Caitlin Caporale	Lowell Oakley
Pharrell Williams	~~Hannah Kirby~~	Paul Pfau	Jacob Rummell	Anthony Riley	~~Travis Ewing~~
Pharrell Williams	~~Meghan Linsey~~	~~Ashley Morgan~~	~~Kimberly Nichole~~	Noelle Bybee	Briar Jonnee
Christina Aguilera					
Christina Aguilera	India Carney	Kimberly Nichole	Rob Taylor	Lexi Dávila	Sonic Valle
Christina Aguilera	~~Koryn Hawthorne~~	Treeva Gibson	Ashley Morgan	Joe Tolo	~~Clinton Washington~~
Christina Aguilera	Ameera Delandro	Jeremy Gaynor	Katelyn Read	Vance Smith	Gabriel Wolfchild
Blake Shelton					
Blake Shelton	Meghan Linsey	Hannah Kirby	Corey Kent White	Brooke Adee	Sarah Potenza
Blake Shelton	~~Brian Johnson~~	Travis Ewing	Kelsie May	Cody Wickline	~~Jacob Rummell~~
Blake Shelton	~~Hannah Kirby~~	~~Joshua Davis~~	Bay Brooks	Matt Snook	Brenna Yaeger
Note: Italicized names are stolen artists (names struck through within former teams).

== Blind auditions ==
The first phase of the competition, the Blind Auditions began airing when the season premiered on February 23, 2015. Adam Levine auditioned as a joke in episode three with the song "Tiny Dancer", with all four chairs turning (Pharrell turned Adam's chair). He "chose" Christina.

Color key

✔	Coach hit his/her "I WANT YOU" button
	Artist defaulted to this coach's team
	Artist selected to join this coach's team
	Artist was eliminated with no coach pressing his or her "I WANT YOU" button

=== Episode 1 (Feb. 23) ===
The four coaches performed "Are You Gonna Go My Way?."

Order	Artist	Age	Hometown	Song	Coach's and artist's choices			
Order	Artist	Age	Hometown	Song	Adam	Pharrell	Christina	Blake
1	Sarah Potenza	34	Smithfield, Rhode Island	"Stay with Me"	✔	✔	✔	✔
2	Lowell Oakley	19	Durham, North Carolina	"Don't Get Around Much Anymore"	✔	✔	—	—
3	Rob Taylor	22	Donaldsonville, Louisiana	"I Want You"	✔	✔	✔	—
4	Ivonne Acero	16	Aguila, Arizona	"Try"	—	—	—	—
5	Cody Wickline	20	Beckley, West Virginia	"He Stopped Loving Her Today"	✔	✔	✔	✔
6	Treeva Gibson	16	Frederick, Maryland	"Young and Beautiful"	—	—	✔	✔
7	Mason Henderson	N/A	Orange Beach, Alabama	"Riptide"	—	—	—	—
8	Meghan Linsey	28	New Orleans, Louisiana	"Love Hurts"	✔	✔	✔	—
9	Joshua Davis	37	Traverse City, Michigan	"I Shall Be Released"	✔	—	—	✔
10	Bryce Sherlow	17	Ho-Ho-Kus, New Jersey	"Cool Kids"	—	—	—	—
11	Sawyer Fredericks	15	Fultonville, New York	"I'm a Man of Constant Sorrow"	✔	✔	✔	✔

=== Episode 2 (Feb. 24) ===
Order	Artist	Age	Hometown	Song	Coach's and artist's choices			
Order	Artist	Age	Hometown	Song	Adam	Pharrell	Christina	Blake
1	Anthony Riley	27	Philadelphia, Pennsylvania	"I Got You (I Feel Good)"	✔	✔	✔	✔
2	Gabriel Wolfchild	26	Seattle, Washington	"Don't Think Twice, It's All Right"	✔	—	✔	✔
3	Brooke Adee	16	Tampa, Florida	"Skinny Love"	✔	—	—	✔
4	Dylan Dunlap	18	Studio City, California	"Talk Dirty"	—	—	—	—
5	Tonya Boyd-Cannon	35	New Orleans, Louisiana	"Happy"	✔	✔	✔	–
6	Joe Tolo	21	Sacramento, California	"To Love Somebody"	—	—	✔	✔
7	Drew Parker	23	Covington, Georgia	Workin' Man Blues	—	—	—	—
8	Mia Z	15	Pittsburgh, Pennsylvania	"The Thrill Is Gone"	—	✔	—	✔
9	Blaze Johnson	23	Columbus, Ohio	"How to Save a Life"	✔	—	—	✔
10	Bryan Pierce	39	Charlotte, North Carolina	"Rocket Man"	—	—	—	—
11	Deanna Johnson	18	Hazlehurst, Georgia	"All I Want"	✔	✔	✔	✔

=== Episode 3 (March 2) ===
Order	Artist	Age	Hometown	Song	Coach's and artist's choices			
Order	Artist	Age	Hometown	Song	Adam	Pharrell	Christina	Blake
1	Kelsie May	15	Louisa, Kentucky	"You're Lookin' at Country"	—	✔	✔	✔
2	Kimberly Nichole	32	New York, New York	"Nutbush City Limits"	—	✔	—	✔
3	Michael Leier	20	Fargo, North Dakota	"Last Kiss"	✔	—	—	✔
4	Hannah Ellis	24	Campbellsville, Kentucky	"This One's for the Girls"	—	—	—	—
5	Mark Lum	42	Austin, Texas	"Jane Says"	—	—	—	—
6	Sara Schulmann	16	Aberdeen Township, New Jersey	"Ghost"	—	—	—	—
7	Sam King	25	New York, New York	"Do I Wanna Know?"	—	—	—	—
8	Travis Ewing	23	Lafayette, Louisiana	"Say My Name"	—	✔	✔	✔
9	Noelle Bybee	17	Syracuse, Utah	"Unbelievers"	—	✔	—	—
10	Bren'nae DeBarge	22	Anchorage, Alaska	"Golden"	✔	—	—	—
11	James McNeiece	26	Traverse City, Michigan	"Lay Me Down"	✔	—	—	—
12	Sonic	23	San Francisco, California	"Money On My Mind"	✔	—	✔	—
13	Ella Khorov	17	New Orleans, Louisiana	"I Can't Stand the Rain"	—	—	—	—
14	Jacob Rummell	18	Lake Township, Ohio	"Count on Me"	✔	—	—	✔
15	Barry Minniefield	52	Fort Wayne, Indiana	"Me and Mrs. Jones"	✔	—	—	—
16	Nicolette Maré	20	Staten Island, New York	"Everything Has Changed"	✔	—	—	—
17	Clinton Washington	26	Little Rock, Arkansas	"Candle in the Wind"	—	—	✔	—
18	Matt Snook	41	Camden Point, Missouri	"Red Dirt Road"	—	—	—	✔
19	India Carney	21	Brooklyn, New York	"New York State of Mind"	✔	✔	✔	✔

=== Episode 4 (March 3) ===
Order	Artist	Age	Hometown	Song	Coach's and artist's choices			
Order	Artist	Age	Hometown	Song	Adam	Pharrell	Christina	Blake
1	Ashley Morgan	26	Costa Mesa, California	"I Wanna Dance with Somebody"	—	✔	—	✔
2	Koryn Hawthorne	17	Abbeville, Louisiana	"My Kind of Love"	—	✔	✔	—
3	Lexi Dávila	17	Lorain, Ohio	"Dreaming of You"	✔	—	—	✔
4	Josh Batstone	18	Fulton, New York	"Amnesia"	✔	—	—	✔
5	Katelyn Read	25	Raleigh, North Carolina	"Breathe (2 AM)"	—	—	✔	—
6	Ameera Delandro	26	Richmond, Virginia	"I'd Rather Go Blind"	—	—	✔	—
7	Bay Brooks	17	Valdosta, Georgia	"All of the Stars"	—	—	—	✔
8	Quincy Mumford	24	Allenhurst, New Jersey	"Dancing Machine"	—	—	—	—
9	Brenna Yaeger	19	Spokane, Washington	"The House That Built Me"	✔	—	—	✔
10	Jeremy Gaynor	30	West Point, New York	"Superstar"	✔	✔	✔	✔
11	Jack Gregori	37	Washington, D.C.	"Ring of Fire"	✔	—	—	—
12	Briar Jonnee	20	Shuqualak, Mississippi	"Take a Bow"	—	✔	—	✔
13	Jess Gallo	20	New Carlisle, Ohio	"Stolen Dance"	—	—	—	—
14	Brian Johnson	24	Cleveland, Ohio	"Reason to Believe"	✔	—	—	✔
15	Corey Kent White	20	Bixby, Oklahoma	"Chicken Fried"	—	✔	—	✔

=== Episode 5 (March 4) ===
The fifth episode, titled "Best of the Blinds", was a recap of all the Blind Auditions broadcast up to that point.

=== Episode 6 (March 9) ===
The sixth episode included the last of the Blind Auditions as well as the first Battles.

Order	Artist	Age	Hometown	Song	Coach's and artist's choices			
Order	Artist	Age	Hometown	Song	Adam	Pharrell	Christina	Blake
1	Nathan Hermida	17	Boston, Massachusetts	"Sure Thing"	✔	—	✔	—
2	Paul Pfau	26	Myersville, Maryland	"Fly Me to the Moon"	Team full	✔	—	✔
3	Gaia Golden	26	Haiku, Hawaii	"Red"	Team full	—	—	—
4	Vance Smith	22	Detroit, Michigan	"Reach Out I'll Be There"	Team full	✔	✔	—
5	Caitlin Caporale	23	Newburgh, New York	"Impossible"	Team full	✔	Team full	✔
6	Athena	23	Chicago, Illinois	"Am I Wrong"	Team full	Team full	Team full	—
7	Jennifer Chung	24	Millbrae, California/Atlanta, Georgia	"Don't Speak"	Team full	Team full	Team full	—
8	Ashley Prince	31	Superior, Colorado	"Bartender"	Team full	Team full	Team full	—
9	Hannah Kirby	20	Sulphur Springs, Texas	"The Letter"	Team full	Team full	Team full	✔

== The Battles ==
The Battles (from the second half of episode 6 to episode 9) consisted of two 2-hour episodes, one 1-hour and one special episodes each on March 9, 10, 16 and 17, 2015. Season eight's advisors are Ellie Goulding for Team Adam, Lionel Richie for Team Pharrell, Nick Jonas for Team Christina and Meghan Trainor for Team Blake.

Color key:

Artist won the Battle and advanced to the Knockouts
Artist lost the Battle but was stolen by another coach and advanced to the Knockouts
Artist lost the Battle and was eliminated

Episode	Coach	Order	Winner	Song	Loser	'Steal' result			
Episode	Coach	Order	Winner	Song	Loser	Adam	Pharrell	Christina	Blake
Episode 6 (Monday, March 9, 2015)	Pharrell Williams	1	Mia Z	"Put the Gun Down"	Ashley Morgan	✔	—N/a	✔	✔
Episode 6 (Monday, March 9, 2015)	Adam Levine	2	Tonya Boyd-Cannon	"P.Y.T. (Pretty Young Thing)"	James McNeiece	—N/a	—	—	—
Episode 6 (Monday, March 9, 2015)	Blake Shelton	3	Brian Johnson	"Knockin' On Heaven's Door"	Joshua Davis	✔	—	—	—N/a
Episode 7 (Tuesday, March 10, 2015)	Pharrell Williams	1	Anthony Riley	"Get Ready"	Travis Ewing	—	—N/a	—	✔
Episode 7 (Tuesday, March 10, 2015)	Christina Aguilera	2	Sonic	"Masterpiece"	Ameera Delandro	—	—	—N/a	—
Episode 7 (Tuesday, March 10, 2015)	Christina Aguilera	3	Joe Tolo	"For the First Time"	Gabriel Wolfchild	—	—	—N/a	—
Episode 7 (Tuesday, March 10, 2015)	Adam Levine	4	Deanna Johnson	"Love Me like You Do"	Nicolette Maré	—N/a	—	—	—
Episode 7 (Tuesday, March 10, 2015)	Adam Levine	5	Nathan Hermida	"Thinking Out Loud"	Josh Batstone	—N/a	—	—	—
Episode 7 (Tuesday, March 10, 2015)	Blake Shelton	6	Sarah Potenza	"Gimme Shelter"	Hannah Kirby	✔	✔	—	—N/a
Episode 7 (Tuesday, March 10, 2015)	Adam Levine	7	Blaze Johnson	"Rude"	Michael Leier	—N/a	—	—	—
Episode 7 (Tuesday, March 10, 2015)	Blake Shelton	8	Cody Wickline	"How Country Feels"	Matt Snook	—	—	—	—N/a
Episode 7 (Tuesday, March 10, 2015)	Pharrell Williams	9	Paul Pfau	"Don't Let Me Down"	Meghan Linsey	✔	—N/a	✔	✔
Episode 8 (Monday, March 16, 2015)	Pharrell Williams	1	Caitlin Caporale	"Fallin'"	Briar Jonnee	—	—N/a	—	Team Full
Episode 8 (Monday, March 16, 2015)	Adam Levine	2	Barry Minniefield	"Feelin' Alright"	Jack Gregori	—N/a	—	—	Team Full
Episode 8 (Monday, March 16, 2015)	Christina Aguilera	3	Treeva Gibson	"Addicted to Love"	Katelyn Read	—	—	—N/a	Team Full
Episode 8 (Monday, March 16, 2015)	Pharrell Williams	4	Lowell Oakley	"Hound Dog"	Kimberly Nichole	✔	—N/a	✔	Team Full
Episode 8 (Monday, March 16, 2015)	Blake Shelton	5	Kelsie May	"Fancy"	Brenna Yaeger	—	—	Team Full	Team Full
Episode 8 (Monday, March 16, 2015)	Christina Aguilera	6	India Carney	"Stay"	Clinton Washington	✔	✔	Team Full	Team Full
Episode 9 (Tuesday, March 17, 2015)	Christina Aguilera	1	Rob Taylor	"Animals"	Jeremy Gaynor	Team Full	—	Team Full	Team Full
Episode 9 (Tuesday, March 17, 2015)	Pharrell Williams	2	Sawyer Fredericks	"Have You Ever Seen the Rain?"	Noelle Bybee	Team Full	—N/a	Team Full	Team Full
Episode 9 (Tuesday, March 17, 2015)	Christina Aguilera	3	Koryn Hawthorne	"Love Me Harder"	Vance Smith	Team Full	—	Team Full	Team Full
Episode 9 (Tuesday, March 17, 2015)	Blake Shelton	4	Brooke Adee	"Style"	Bay Brooks	Team Full	—	Team Full	Team Full
Episode 9 (Tuesday, March 17, 2015)	Adam Levine	5	Lexi Dávila	"Unwritten"	Bren'nae DeBarge	Team Full	—	Team Full	Team Full
Episode 9 (Tuesday, March 17, 2015)	Blake Shelton	6	Corey Kent White	"I Want Crazy"	Jacob Rummell	Team Full	✔	Team Full	Team Full

== The Knockouts ==
For the Knockouts, Nate Ruess was assigned as a mentor for contestants in all four teams. After announcing Anthony Riley's withdrawal from the competition, Pharrell grouped three of his team members into one knockout, in which two contestants from the trio advanced and one being declared loser. Just like season five, the coaches can steal one losing artist. The top 20 contestants will then move on to the "Live Shows".

Color key:

Artist won the Knockout and advanced to the Live Shows
Artist lost the Knockout but was stolen by another coach and advanced to the Live Shows
Artist lost the Knockout and was eliminated

Episode	Coach	Order	Song	Artists		Song	'Steal' result			
Episode	Coach	Order	Song	Winner(s)	Loser	Song	Adam	Pharrell	Christina	Blake
Episode 10 (Monday, March 23, 2015)	Christina Aguilera	1	"A Woman's Worth"	Sonic	Ashley Morgan	"Heartbreaker"	—	—	—N/a	—
Episode 10 (Monday, March 23, 2015)	Blake Shelton	2	"Wasted Love"	Sarah Potenza	Brian Johnson	"Nothing Ever Hurt Like You"	✔	—	—	—N/a
Episode 10 (Monday, March 23, 2015)	Adam Levine	3	"Leave Your Lover"	Nathan Hermida	Clinton Washington	"Wanted"	Team full	—	—	—
Episode 10 (Monday, March 23, 2015)	Pharrell Williams	4	"Collide"	Sawyer Fredericks	Paul Pfau	"I Don't Need No Doctor"	Team full	—N/a	—	—
Episode 10 (Monday, March 23, 2015)	Pharrell Williams	4	"Hold On, I'm Coming"	Mia Z	Paul Pfau	"I Don't Need No Doctor"	Team full	—N/a	—	—
Episode 10 (Monday, March 23, 2015)	Blake Shelton	5	"(You Make Me Feel Like) A Natural Woman"	Meghan Linsey	Travis Ewing	"I Don't Want to Be"	Team full	—	—	—N/a
Episode 10 (Monday, March 23, 2015)	Christina Aguilera	6	"If You Love Somebody Set Them Free"	Kimberly Nichole	Koryn Hawthorne	"Try"	Team full	✔	—	—
Episode 11 (Tuesday, March 24, 2015)	Blake Shelton	1	"Live Like You Were Dying"	Corey Kent White	Cody Wickline	"Til My Last Day"	Team full	Team full	—	—N/a
Episode 11 (Tuesday, March 24, 2015)	Adam Levine	2	"Listen to Your Heart"	Deanna Johnson	Blaze Johnson	"You Found Me"	Team full	Team full	—	—
Episode 11 (Tuesday, March 24, 2015)	Pharrell Williams	3	"Warrior"	Caitlin Caporale	Hannah Kirby	"Higher Love"	Team full	Team full	—	✔
Episode 12 (Monday, March 30, 2015)	Adam Levine	1	"I Wish"	Tonya Boyd-Cannon	Barry Minniefield	"What You Won't Do for Love"	Team full	Team full	—	Team full
Episode 12 (Monday, March 30, 2015)	Blake Shelton	2	"Electric Feel"	Brooke Adee	Kelsie May	"Tim McGraw"	Team full	Team full	—	Team full
Episode 12 (Monday, March 30, 2015)	Christina Aguilera	3	"Big White Room"	India Carney	Joe Tolo	"One of Us"	Team full	Team full	—N/a	Team full
Episode 12 (Monday, March 30, 2015)	Pharrell Williams	4	"My Girl"	Lowell Oakley	Jacob Rummell	"Life of the Party"	Team full	Team full	—	Team full
Episode 12 (Monday, March 30, 2015)	Christina Aguilera	5	"Love and Happiness"	Rob Taylor	Treeva Gibson	"Chasing Pavements"	Team full	Team full	—N/a	Team full
Episode 12 (Monday, March 30, 2015)	Adam Levine	6	"Arms of a Woman"	Joshua Davis	Lexi Dávila	"Anything Could Happen"	Team full	Team full	✔	Team full
Episode 13 (Tuesday, March 31, 2015)	The thirteenth episode was a one-hour recap episode titled "The Road to the Live Shows". This recap highlighted the journey of the top 20 contestants.									

== Live shows ==
The live shows is the final phase of the competition, consisting of seven weeks starting on the playoffs and concluding on the season finale.

Color key:

Artist was saved by the Public's votes
Artist was saved by his/her coach or was placed in the bottom three
Artist was saved by the Instant Save
Artist's iTunes vote multiplied by 10 (except The Finals) after his/her studio version of the song reached iTunes top 10
Artist was eliminated

=== Week 1: Live playoffs (April 6, 7 & 8) ===
The Live Playoffs comprised episodes 14, 15, and 16 (the results show). The top twenty artists perform for the votes, and the two artists per each team advances via public vote, while the bottom three artists compete for the coaches' save in the results show. Monday's performance featured Teams Blake and Pharrell, and Teams Adam and Christina for the Tuesday's performance.

Episode	Coach	Order	Artist	Song	Result
Episode 14 (Monday, April 6, 2015)	Blake Shelton	1	Sarah Potenza	"Free Bird"	Eliminated
Episode 14 (Monday, April 6, 2015)	Pharrell Williams	2	Caitlin Caporale	"Best Thing I Never Had"	Eliminated
Episode 14 (Monday, April 6, 2015)	Blake Shelton	3	Hannah Kirby	"I Feel The Earth Move"	Blake's choice
Episode 14 (Monday, April 6, 2015)	Pharrell Williams	4	Lowell Oakley	"Jealous"	Eliminated
Episode 14 (Monday, April 6, 2015)	Pharrell Williams	5	Mia Z	"Ain't No Sunshine"	Public's vote
Episode 14 (Monday, April 6, 2015)	Pharrell Williams	6	Koryn Hawthorne	"How Great Thou Art"	Pharrell's choice
Episode 14 (Monday, April 6, 2015)	Blake Shelton	7	Corey Kent White	"Make You Feel My Love"	Public's vote
Episode 14 (Monday, April 6, 2015)	Blake Shelton	8	Brooke Adee	"Love Me Like You Do"	Eliminated
Episode 14 (Monday, April 6, 2015)	Blake Shelton	9	Meghan Linsey	"Love Runs Out"	Public's vote
Episode 14 (Monday, April 6, 2015)	Pharrell Williams	10	Sawyer Fredericks	"Trouble"	Public's vote
Episode 15 (Tuesday, April 7, 2015)	Adam Levine	1	Tonya Boyd-Cannon	"Take Me to the Pilot"	Eliminated
Episode 15 (Tuesday, April 7, 2015)	Adam Levine	2	Joshua Davis	"Budapest"	Public's vote
Episode 15 (Tuesday, April 7, 2015)	Christina Aguilera	3	Sonic	"I'm Going Down"	Eliminated
Episode 15 (Tuesday, April 7, 2015)	Adam Levine	4	Brian Johnson	"At This Moment"	Adam's choice
Episode 15 (Tuesday, April 7, 2015)	Christina Aguilera	5	Kimberly Nichole	"What's Up?"	Public's vote
Episode 15 (Tuesday, April 7, 2015)	Christina Aguilera	6	Lexi Dávila	"All By Myself"	Eliminated
Episode 15 (Tuesday, April 7, 2015)	Adam Levine	7	Nathan Hermida	"Chains"	Eliminated
Episode 15 (Tuesday, April 7, 2015)	Christina Aguilera	8	India Carney	"Hurt"	Public's vote
Episode 15 (Tuesday, April 7, 2015)	Christina Aguilera	9	Rob Taylor	"Earned It"	Christina's choice
Episode 15 (Tuesday, April 7, 2015)	Adam Levine	10	Deanna Johnson	"Down to the River to Pray"	Public's vote

Non-competition performances
Order	Performer	Song
14.1	Maroon 5	"Sugar"
15.1	Sia	"Elastic Heart"
16.1	Wiz Khalifa ft. Chris Jamison	"See You Again"
16.2	Team Blake (Brooke Adee, Corey Kent White, Hannah Kirby, Meghan Linsey, Sarah Potenza)	"I'll Take You There"
16.3	Team Christina (India Carney, Kimberly Nichole, Lexi Dávila, Rob Taylor, Sonic)	"Like a Prayer"
16.4	Team Pharrell (Caitlin Caporale, Sawyer Fredericks, Koryn Hawthorne, Lowell Oakley, Mia Z)	"Say Something"
16.5	Team Adam (Brian Johnson, Deanna Johnson, Joshua Davis, Nathan Hermida, Tonya Boyd-Cannon)	"Diamonds"

=== Week 2: Top 12 (April 13 & 14) ===
The Top 12 performed on Monday, April 13, 2015, with the results following on Tuesday, April 14, 2015. The Instant Save returned once again this season, with the bottom three artists performing for a spot on the next round via the viewers' votes from Twitter, and is in play until the semifinals. Oklahoma country music star Reba McEntire, last seen on the show's first season as an advisor for Team Blake, returned to serve as a mentor for the top 12 contestants.

This week's iTunes multiplier bonuses were awarded for Sawyer Fredericks (#2), Kimberly Nichole (#3) and Meghan Linsey (#5).

Episode	Coach	Order	Artist	Song	Results
Episode 17 (Monday, April 13, 2015)	Blake Shelton	1	Hannah Kirby	"Edge of Seventeen"	Public's vote
Episode 17 (Monday, April 13, 2015)	Adam Levine	2	Brian Johnson	"If I Ever Lose My Faith in You"	Bottom three
Episode 17 (Monday, April 13, 2015)	Christina Aguilera	3	India Carney	"Take Me to Church"	Public's vote
Episode 17 (Monday, April 13, 2015)	Pharrell Williams	4	Mia Z	"Miss You"	Bottom three
Episode 17 (Monday, April 13, 2015)	Adam Levine	5	Deanna Johnson	"Oceans (Where Feet May Fail)"	Bottom three
Episode 17 (Monday, April 13, 2015)	Pharrell Williams	6	Sawyer Fredericks	"Imagine"	Public's vote
Episode 17 (Monday, April 13, 2015)	Christina Aguilera	7	Rob Taylor	"I Put a Spell on You"	Public's vote
Episode 17 (Monday, April 13, 2015)	Blake Shelton	8	Corey Kent White	"Why"	Public's vote
Episode 17 (Monday, April 13, 2015)	Pharrell Williams	9	Koryn Hawthorne	"Stronger (What Doesn't Kill You)"	Public's vote
Episode 17 (Monday, April 13, 2015)	Adam Levine	10	Joshua Davis	"America"	Public's vote
Episode 17 (Monday, April 13, 2015)	Blake Shelton	11	Meghan Linsey	"Girl Crush"	Public's vote
Episode 17 (Monday, April 13, 2015)	Christina Aguilera	12	Kimberly Nichole	"House of the Rising Sun"	Public's vote
Episode 18 (Tuesday, April 14, 2015)
Episode 18 (Tuesday, April 14, 2015)	Instant Save performances				
Episode 18 (Tuesday, April 14, 2015)	Pharrell Williams	1	Mia Z	"Stormy Monday"	Eliminated
Episode 18 (Tuesday, April 14, 2015)	Adam Levine	2	Brian Johnson	"Amazed"	Eliminated
Episode 18 (Tuesday, April 14, 2015)	Adam Levine	3	Deanna Johnson	"It Will Rain"	Instant Save

Non-competition performances
Order	Performer	Song
17.1	Nick Jonas	"Chains"
17.2	Blake Shelton and his team (Meghan Linsey, Corey Kent White, Hannah Kirby)	"In the Midnight Hour"
17.3	Christina Aguilera and her team (India Carney, Rob Taylor, Kimberly Nichole)	"Hotel California"

=== Week 3: Top 10 (April 20 & 21) ===
The Top 10 performed on Monday, April 20, 2015, with the results following on Tuesday, April 21, 2015. Adam, Blake, Christina and Pharrell brought in Dave Stewart, Scott Hendricks, Mark Ronson and Ryan Tedder respectively to help in this week's coaching.

This week's recipients of the iTunes multiplier bonuses were Koryn Hawthorne (#3) and Fredericks (#4).

Episode	Coach	Order	Artist	Song	Result
Episode 19 (Monday, April 20, 2015)	Christina Aguilera	1	Kimberly Nichole	"Something's Got a Hold on Me"	Public's vote
Episode 19 (Monday, April 20, 2015)	Adam Levine	2	Joshua Davis	"Hold Back the River"	Bottom three
Episode 19 (Monday, April 20, 2015)	Blake Shelton	3	Hannah Kirby	"Shout"	Public's vote
Episode 19 (Monday, April 20, 2015)	Blake Shelton	4	Meghan Linsey	"Home"	Public's vote
Episode 19 (Monday, April 20, 2015)	Pharrell Williams	5	Koryn Hawthorne	"Make It Rain"	Public's vote
Episode 19 (Monday, April 20, 2015)	Adam Levine	6	Deanna Johnson	"Somebody to Love"	Bottom three
Episode 19 (Monday, April 20, 2015)	Christina Aguilera	7	Rob Taylor	"A Song for You"	Bottom three
Episode 19 (Monday, April 20, 2015)	Blake Shelton	8	Corey Kent White	"Unwound"	Public's vote
Episode 19 (Monday, April 20, 2015)	Pharrell Williams	9	Sawyer Fredericks	"Iris"	Public's vote
Episode 19 (Monday, April 20, 2015)	Christina Aguilera	10	India Carney	"Run to You"	Public's vote
Episode 20 (Tuesday, April 21, 2015)
Episode 20 (Tuesday, April 21, 2015)	Instant Save performances				
Episode 20 (Tuesday, April 21, 2015)	Christina Aguilera	1	Rob Taylor	"(Sittin' On) The Dock of the Bay"	Eliminated
Episode 20 (Tuesday, April 21, 2015)	Adam Levine	2	Deanna Johnson	"Help Me Make It Through the Night"	Eliminated
Episode 20 (Tuesday, April 21, 2015)	Adam Levine	3	Joshua Davis	"I Won't Back Down"	Instant Save

Non-competition performances
Order	Performer	Song
19.1	Top 10	"Rocket Man/Saturday Night's Alright for Fighting"
20.1	Pharrell Williams and his team (Sawyer Fredericks, Koryn Hawthorne)	"I Don't Want to Be"
20.2	Reba McEntire	"Going Out Like That"
20.3	Adam Levine and his team (Deanna Johnson and Joshua Davis)	"The Joker"

=== Week 4: Top 8 (April 27 & 28) ===
The Top 8 performed on Monday, April 27, 2015, with the results following on Tuesday, April 28, 2015. Most of the previous coaches from past seasons returned to advise the remaining artists: Usher was the Advisor for Team Adam, Gwen Stefani advised both Teams Pharrell and Christina, and Cee Lo Green advised Team Blake. Shakira was the only previous coach not to return, due to the recent birth of her second child, but she did record a video message that was aired during the live show.

iTunes bonus multipliers were awarded to Fredericks and (#2) and Joshua Davis (#4). This week's Instant Save was the closest in the show's history, with Carney being saved by only two votes ahead runner-up Kent White.

Episode	Coach	Order	Artist	Song	Result
Episode 21 (Monday, April 27, 2015)	Blake Shelton	1	Hannah Kirby	"We Don't Need Another Hero"	Bottom three
Episode 21 (Monday, April 27, 2015)	Adam Levine	2	Joshua Davis	"Fields of Gold"	Public's vote
Episode 21 (Monday, April 27, 2015)	Christina Aguilera	3	Kimberly Nichole	"Creep"	Public's vote
Episode 21 (Monday, April 27, 2015)	Blake Shelton	4	Meghan Linsey	"Something"	Public's vote
Episode 21 (Monday, April 27, 2015)	Christina Aguilera	5	India Carney	"Over the Rainbow"	Bottom three
Episode 21 (Monday, April 27, 2015)	Pharrell Williams	6	Sawyer Fredericks	"Simple Man"	Public's vote
Episode 21 (Monday, April 27, 2015)	Blake Shelton	7	Corey Kent White	"When I See You Smile"	Bottom three
Episode 21 (Monday, April 27, 2015)	Pharrell Williams	8	Koryn Hawthorne	"Girl On Fire"	Public's vote
Episode 22 (Tuesday, April 28, 2015)
Episode 22 (Tuesday, April 28, 2015)	Instant Save performances				
Episode 22 (Tuesday, April 28, 2015)	Blake Shelton	1	Hannah Kirby	"Radioactive"	Eliminated
Episode 22 (Tuesday, April 28, 2015)	Blake Shelton	2	Corey Kent White	"Somebody Like You"	Eliminated
Episode 22 (Tuesday, April 28, 2015)	Christina Aguilera	3	India Carney	"Human"	Instant Save

Non-competition performances
Order	Performer	Song
21.1	Top 8 Males (Sawyer Fredericks, Corey Kent White, and Joshua Davis)	"Hey Brother"
21.2	Top 8 Females (Hannah Kirby, Koryn Hawthorne, Kimberly Nichole, Meghan Linsey, India Carney)	"Wake Me Up"
21.3	Blake Shelton	"Sangria"
21.4	Matt McAndrew	"Counting on Love"
22.1	Jason Derulo (with India Carney and Kimberly Nichole)	"Want to Want Me"
22.2	Rozzi Crane	"Psycho"
22.3	Lee Brice (with Corey Kent White)	"Drinking Class"

=== Week 5: Top 6 (May 4 & 5) ===
The Top 6 performed on Monday, May 4, 2015, with the results following on Tuesday, May 5, 2015. In honor of Mother's Day, each artist performed one song on Monday celebrating "the mothers in their lives". This week eliminations is a single elimination and the bottom two artists faced the Instant Save.

iTunes multiplier bonuses were awarded to Fredericks (#3 and #10) and Linsey (#5).

Episode	Coach	Artist	Order	Song (Mother's Day dedication)	Order	Song (Coach's Choice)	Result
Episode 23 (Monday, May 4, 2015)	Christina Aguilera	India Carney	1	"Glory"	10	"Lay Me Down"	Bottom two
Episode 23 (Monday, May 4, 2015)	Adam Levine	Joshua Davis	8	"In My Life"	2	"Desire"	Public's vote
Episode 23 (Monday, May 4, 2015)	Pharrell Williams	Koryn Hawthorne	3	"Everybody Hurts"	9	"Dream On"	Public's vote
Episode 23 (Monday, May 4, 2015)	Christina Aguilera	Kimberly Nichole	4	"Free Fallin'"	7	"Dirty Diana"	Bottom two
Episode 23 (Monday, May 4, 2015)	Blake Shelton	Meghan Linsey	12	"Amazing Grace"	5	"Steamroller Blues"	Public's vote
Episode 23 (Monday, May 4, 2015)	Pharrell Williams	Sawyer Fredericks	6	"Shine On"	11	"Take Me to the River"	Public's vote
Episode 24 (Tuesday, May 5, 2015)
Episode 24 (Tuesday, May 5, 2015)	Instant Save Performances						
Episode 24 (Tuesday, May 5, 2015)	Christina Aguilera	Kimberly Nichole	1	"Seven Nation Army"			Eliminated
Episode 24 (Tuesday, May 5, 2015)	Christina Aguilera	India Carney	2	"Perfect"			Instant Save

Non-competition performances
Order	Performer	Song
24.1	Jacquie Lee	"Tears Fall"
24.2	Avery Wilson	"If I Have To"
24.3	Vicci Martinez	"Bad News Breaker"
24.4	Craig Wayne Boyd	"I'm Still Here"

=== Week 6: Semifinals (May 11 & 12) ===
The Top 5 performed on Monday, May 11, 2015, with the results following on Tuesday, May 12, 2015. Similar to the Quarterfinals, the bottom two artists compete for the Instant Save and one artist was eliminated. iTunes multiplier bonuses were awarded to Fredericks (#2 and #3) and Linsey (#5). Special guests in the audience included Anna Kendrick, Brittany Snow and Hailee Steinfeld from Pitch Perfect 2.

With the advancement of Sawyer Fredericks and Koryn Hawthorne, Pharrell Williams became the third coach to bring multiple artists to the finale, first being Blake Shelton in the 3rd season and second being Adam Levine in the 5th season. With the elimination of Carney, Aguilera no longer has any remaining artists on her team.

Episode	Coach	Artist	Order	Song (Coach's Choice)	Order	Song (Artist's dedication to home)	Result
Episode 25 (Monday, May 11, 2015)
Episode 25 (Monday, May 11, 2015)	Adam Levine	Joshua Davis	1	"I Can't Make You Love Me"	6	"When I Paint My Masterpiece"	Public's vote
Episode 25 (Monday, May 11, 2015)	Pharrell Williams	Koryn Hawthorne	2	"One"	7	"Oh Mary Don't You Weep"	Bottom two
Episode 25 (Monday, May 11, 2015)	Blake Shelton	Meghan Linsey	3	"I'm Not the Only One"	8	"Tennessee Whiskey"	Public's vote
Episode 25 (Monday, May 11, 2015)	Christina Aguilera	India Carney	4	"Gravity"	9	"Earth Song"	Bottom two
Episode 25 (Monday, May 11, 2015)	Pharrell Williams	Sawyer Fredericks	5	"For What It's Worth"	10	"A Thousand Years"	Public's vote
Episode 26 (Tuesday, May 12, 2015)
Episode 26 (Tuesday, May 12, 2015)	Instant Save performances						
Episode 26 (Tuesday, May 12, 2015)	Christina Aguilera	India Carney	1	"Dark Side"			Eliminated
Episode 26 (Tuesday, May 12, 2015)	Pharrell Williams	Koryn Hawthorne	2	"If I Were a Boy"			Instant Save

Non-competition performances
Order	Performer	Song
25.1	Nate Ruess	"Nothing Without Love"
26.1	Walk the Moon	"Shut Up and Dance"
26.2	Snoop Dogg and Pharrell Williams	"California Roll"
26.3	India Carney, Koryn Hawthorne, and Meghan Linsey	"Faithfully"
26.4	Joshua Davis and Sawyer Fredericks	"Drift Away"

=== Week 7: Finale (May 18 & 19) ===
The Top four performed on Monday, May 18, 2015, with the final results following on Tuesday, May 19, 2015. Finalists performed an original song, a duet with the coach, and a solo song. As with previous seasons, there was no iTunes bonus multiplier applied to songs performed in the finale episodes; all iTunes votes received for the six weeks leading to the finale were cumulatively added to online, phone and app finale votes for each finalist. By the time voting ended, Fredericks charted at #2, #3, Linsey at #5, and Davis at #9 on iTunes.

With the advancement of Meghan Linsey, Joshua Davis, and Koryn Hawthorne, this is the first time in The Voice history where 3 stolen artists advanced to the finale. Meghan is originally from Team Pharrell, Joshua Davis from Blake's team, and Koryn Hawthorne formerly from Christina's team. As a result, almost all 4 finalists were stolen artists.

Coach	Artist	Order	Solo Song	Order	Original Song	Order	Duet Song (With Coach)	Result
Pharrell Williams	Koryn Hawthorne	1	"It's a Man's Man's Man's World"	10	"Bright Fire"	6	"We Can Work It Out"	Fourth place
Blake Shelton	Meghan Linsey	11	"When a Man Loves a Woman"	2	"Change My Mind"	8	"Freeway of Love"	Runner-up
Pharrell Williams	Sawyer Fredericks	12	"Old Man"	5	"Please"	3	"Summer Breeze"	Winner
Adam Levine	Joshua Davis	7	"Hallelujah"	4	"The Workingman's Hymn"	9	"Diamonds on the Soles of Her Shoes"	Third place

Non-competition performances
Order	Performer	Song
28.1	Top 20	"Carry On / Some Nights"
28.2	Joshua Davis (with Brian Johnson, Deanna Johnson, Kimberly Nichole, and Corey Kent White)	"She Talks to Angels"
28.3	Meghan Trainor	"Dear Future Husband"
28.4	Kelly Clarkson and Koryn Hawthorne	"I'd Rather Go Blind"
28.5	Meghan Linsey (with Sarah Potenza)	"Piece of My Heart"
28.6	Maroon 5	"This Summer"
28.7	John Fogerty and Sawyer Fredericks	"Born on the Bayou" "Bad Moon Rising" "Have You Ever Seen the Rain"
28.8	Sheryl Crow and Joshua Davis	"Give It to Me"
28.9	Luke Bryan	"Kick the Dust Up"
28.10	Koryn Hawthorne (with Caitlin Caporale, India Carney, Lexi Dávila, Mia Z and Tonya Boyd-Cannon)	"Uptown Funk"
28.11	Ed Sheeran	"Photograph"
28.12	Kelly Clarkson and Meghan Linsey	"Invincible"
28.13	Sawyer Fredericks (with Brooke Adee and Lowell Oakley)	"Lie To Me"
28.14	The Voice Coaches - Adam Levine, Pharrell Williams, Christina Aguilera, and Blake Shelton	"The Thrill is Gone"
28.15	Sawyer Fredericks (winner)	"Please"

== Elimination chart ==
=== Overall ===
Color key
Artist's info

- Team Adam
- Team Pharrell
- Team Christina
- Team Blake

Result details

- Winner
- Runner-up
- Third place
- Fourth place
- Saved by Instant Save (via Twitter)
- Artist was saved by the public
- Artist was saved by his/her coach
- Artist was eliminated

Live show results per week
Artist	Week 1 Playoffs	Week 2	Week 3	Week 4	Week 5	Week 6	Week 7 Finale
Sawyer Fredericks	Safe	Safe	Safe	Safe	Safe	Safe	Winner
Meghan Linsey	Safe	Safe	Safe	Safe	Safe	Safe	Runner-up
Joshua Davis	Safe	Safe	Safe	Safe	Safe	Safe	3rd place
Koryn Hawthorne	Safe	Safe	Safe	Safe	Safe	Safe	4th place
India Carney	Safe	Safe	Safe	Safe	Safe	Eliminated	Eliminated (Week 6)
Kimberly Nichole	Safe	Safe	Safe	Safe	Eliminated	Eliminated (Week 5)	
Corey Kent White	Safe	Safe	Safe	Eliminated	Eliminated (Week 4)		
Hannah Kirby	Safe	Safe	Safe	Eliminated	Eliminated (Week 4)		
Rob Taylor	Safe	Safe	Eliminated	Eliminated (Week 3)			
Deanna Johnson	Safe	Safe	Eliminated	Eliminated (Week 3)			
Mia Z	Safe	Eliminated	Eliminated (Week 2)				
Brian Johnson	Safe	Eliminated	Eliminated (Week 2)				
Brooke Adee	Eliminated	Eliminated (Week 1)					
Tonya Boyd-Cannon	Eliminated	Eliminated (Week 1)					
Caitlin Caporale	Eliminated	Eliminated (Week 1)					
Lexi Dávila	Eliminated	Eliminated (Week 1)					
Nathan Hermida	Eliminated	Eliminated (Week 1)					
Lowell Oakley	Eliminated	Eliminated (Week 1)					
Sarah Potenza	Eliminated	Eliminated (Week 1)					
Sonic	Eliminated	Eliminated (Week 1)					

=== Team ===
Color key
Artist's info

- Team Adam
- Team Pharrell
- Team Christina
- Team Blake

Result details

- Winner
- Runner-up
- Third place
- Fourth Place
- Eliminated
- Artist Saved by Instant Save (via Twitter)
- Artist received one or more iTunes bonus that week
- Number of iTunes bonuses received
- Teams are in 3 artists
- No artists remaining on his/her team

Artist	Week 1 Playoffs	Week 2	Week 3	Week 4	Week 5	Week 6	Week 7 Finale
Joshua Davis	Public's vote	Advanced	Advanced	Advanced	Advanced	Advanced	Third place
Deanna Johnson	Public's vote	Advanced	Eliminated				
Brian Johnson	Coach's Choice	Eliminated					
Tonya Boyd-Cannon	Eliminated						
Nathan Hermida	Eliminated						
Sawyer Fredericks	Public's vote	Advanced	Advanced	Advanced	Advanced	Advanced	Winner
Koryn Hawthorne	Coach's Choice	Advanced	Advanced	Advanced	Advanced	Advanced	Fourth place
Mia Z	Public's vote	Eliminated					
Caitlin Caporale	Eliminated						
Lowell Oakley	Eliminated						
India Carney	Public's vote	Advanced	Advanced	Advanced	Advanced	Eliminated	
Kimberly Nichole	Public's vote	Advanced	Advanced	Advanced	Eliminated		
Rob Taylor	Coach's Choice	Advanced	Eliminated				
Lexi Dávila	Eliminated						
Sonic	Eliminated						
Meghan Linsey	Public's vote	Advanced	Advanced	Advanced	Advanced	Advanced	Runner-up
Hannah Kirby	Coach's Choice	Advanced	Advanced	Eliminated			
Corey Kent White	Public's vote	Advanced	Advanced	Eliminated			
Brooke Adee	Eliminated						
Sarah Potenza	Eliminated						

Rank	Coach	Top 12	Top 10	Top 8	Top 6	Top 5	Top 4
1	Pharrell Williams	3	2	2	2	2	2
2	Blake Shelton	3	3	3	1	1	1
3	Adam Levine	3	2	1	1	1	1
4	Christina Aguilera	3	3	2	2	1	0

== Performances by guests/coaches ==
Episode	Show segment	Performer(s)	Title	Reaction		Performance type	Source
Episode	Show segment	Performer(s)	Title	Hot 100	Hot digital	Performance type	Source
14	The Live Playoffs	Maroon 5	"Sugar"	3 (-1)	—N/a	live performance	
15	The Live Playoffs	Sia	"Elastic Heart"	47 (+5)	—N/a	live performance	
16	The Live Playoffs Results	Wiz Khalifa feat. Chris Jamison	"See You Again"	1 (+9)	—N/a	live performance	
18	Top 12 Results	Nick Jonas	"Chains"	14 (-1)	—N/a	live performance	
20	Top 10 Results	Reba McEntire	"Going Out Like That"	—N/a	—N/a	live performance	
21	Top 8 Performance	Matt McAndrew	"Counting on Love"	—N/a	—N/a	live performance	
21	Top 8 Performance	Blake Shelton	"Sangria"	44 (+20)	—N/a	live performance	
22	Top 8 Results	Rozzi Crane	"Psycho"	—N/a	—N/a	live performance	
22	Top 8 Results	Jason Derulo	"Want to Want Me"	8 (+2)	—N/a	live performance	
22	Top 8 Results	Lee Brice	"Drinking Class"	—N/a	—N/a	live performance	
24	Top 6 Results	Jacquie Lee	"Tears Fall"	—N/a	—N/a	live performance	
24	Top 6 Results	Avery Wilson	"If I Have To"	—N/a	—N/a	live performance	
24	Top 6 Results	Vicci Martinez	"Bad News Breaker"	—N/a	—N/a	live performance	
24	Top 6 Results	Craig Wayne Boyd	"I'm Still Here"	—N/a	—N/a	live performance	
25	Semifinal Performance	Nate Ruess	"Nothing Without Love"	—N/a	—N/a	live performance	?
26	Semifinal Results	Walk the Moon	"Shut Up and Dance"	—N/a	—N/a	live performance	?
26	Semifinal Results	Snoop Dogg feat. Pharrell Williams	"California Roll"	—N/a	—N/a	live performance	?
28	Finals	Meghan Trainor	"Dear Future Husband"	—N/a	—N/a	live performance	?
28	Finals	Maroon 5	"This Summer"	—N/a	—N/a	live performance	?
28	Finals	Luke Bryan	"Kick the Dust Up"	—N/a	—N/a	live performance	?
28	Finals	Ed Sheeran	"Photograph"	—N/a	—N/a	live performance	?
28	Finals	John Fogerty and Sawyer Fredericks	"Born on the Bayou" "Bad Moon Rising" "Have You Ever Seen the Rain?"	—N/a	—N/a	live performance	?
28	Finals	Sheryl Crow and Joshua Davis	"Give It To Me"	—N/a	—N/a	live performance	?
28	Finals	Kelly Clarkson and Koryn Hawthorne	"I'd Rather Go Blind"	—N/a	—N/a	live performance	?
28	Finals	Kelly Clarkson and Meghan Linsey	"Invincible"	—N/a	—N/a	live performance	?

== Artists' appearances in other media ==
- DeAnna Johnson sang in the blind auditions for season five, but failed to turn any chairs. She has since been crowned Miss Georgia USA and appeared in the Miss USA pageant on Fox.
- Meghan Linsey and her then fiancé, Joshua Scott Jones, won season two of the television talent show Can You Duet as the duo Steel Magnolia.
- Koryn Hawthorne would go on to be nominated at the 61st Grammy Award for Best Gospel Performance/Song.
- Sarah Potenza competed on sixteenth season of America's Got Talent. She was among the contestants who were not chosen to be in the Quarter-Finals.

== Ratings ==
The season eight premiere was watched by 13.97 million viewers with a 4.1 rating in the 18–49 demographic. It was up from last season's premiere by 1.02 million viewers. The season eight premiere was up 21% from the previous season's finale. The second episode retained 95% of viewers in P18-49 from the premiere episode, compared to just 79%, from the previous season.

Episode		Original airdate	Production	Time slot (ET)	Viewers (in millions)	Adults (18–49)		Source
Episode		Original airdate	Production	Time slot (ET)	Viewers (in millions)	Rating	Share	Source
1	"The Blind Auditions Premiere, Part 1"	February 23, 2015	801	Monday 8:00 p.m.	13.97	4.1	11	
2	"The Blind Auditions Premiere, Part 2"	February 24, 2015	802	Tuesday 8:00 p.m.	14.06	3.9	11	
3	"The Blind Auditions, Part 3"	March 2, 2015	803	Monday 8:00 p.m.	14.67	3.9	12	
4	"The Blind Auditions, Part 4"	March 3, 2015	804	Tuesday 8:00 p.m.	15.54	4.1	13	
5	"Best of the Blinds"	March 4, 2015	805	Wednesday 8:00 p.m.	8.60	2.1	6	
6	"Blinds End and Battles Begin"	March 9, 2015	806	Monday 8:00 p.m.	13.95	3.8	12	
7	"The Battles Premiere, Part 2"	March 10, 2015	807	Tuesday 8:00 p.m.	13.73	3.8	12	
8	"The Battles, Part 3"	March 16, 2015	808	Monday 8:00 p.m.	12.21	3.3	10	
9	"The Battles, Part 4"	March 17, 2015	809	Tuesday 8:00 p.m.	12.82	3.4	11	
10	"The Knockouts Premiere, Part 1"	March 23, 2015	810	Monday 8:00 p.m.	12.20	3.4	10	
11	"The Knockouts Premiere, Part 2"	March 24, 2015	811	Tuesday 8:00 p.m.	11.62	2.8	9	
12	"The Knockouts, Part 3"	March 30, 2015	812	Monday 8:00 p.m.	11.87	3.2	10	
13	"The Road to the Live Shows"	March 31, 2015	813	Tuesday 8:00 p.m.	8.57	2.0	7	
14	"The Live Playoffs, Night 1"	April 6, 2015	814	Monday 8:00 p.m.	10.97	2.9	9	
15	"The Live Playoffs, Night 2"	April 7, 2015	815	Tuesday 8:00 p.m.	11.07	2.7	9	
16	"The Live Playoffs, Results"	April 8, 2015	816	Wednesday 8:00 p.m.	9.64	2.2	7	
17	"Live Top 12 Performance"	April 13, 2015	817	Monday 8:00 p.m.	11.04	2.9	9	
18	"Live Top 12 Results"	April 14, 2015	818	Tuesday 8:00 p.m.	10.69	2.5	9	
19	"Live Top 10 Performance"	April 20, 2015	819	Monday 8:00 p.m.	10.58	2.6	6	
20	"Live Top 10 Results"	April 21, 2015	820	Tuesday 8:00 p.m.	11.25	2.6	9	
21	"Live Top 8 Performance"	April 27, 2015	821	Monday 8:00 p.m.	10.49	2.6	8	
22	"Live Top 8 Results"	April 28, 2015	822	Tuesday 8:00 p.m.	9.49	2.2	8	
23	"Live Top 6 Performance"	May 4, 2015	823	Monday 8:00 p.m.	9.90	2.3	8	
24	"Live Top 6 Results"	May 5, 2015	824	Tuesday 8:00 p.m.	8.99	2.0	7	
25	"Live Top 5 Semi-Final Performance"	May 11, 2015	825	Monday 8:00 p.m.	10.05	2.4	8	
26	"Live Top 5 Semi-Final Results"	May 12, 2015	826	Tuesday 8:00 p.m.	9.14	2.1	7	
27	"Live Finale Performance"	May 18, 2015	827	Monday 8:00 p.m.	11.32	2.6	8	
28	"Live Finale Results"	May 19, 2015	828	Tuesday 9:00 p.m.	11.56	2.9	9	
