= Steel Magnolias (disambiguation) =

Steel Magnolias is a 1989 American comedy-drama film directed by Herbert Ross.

Steel Magnolias may also refer to:

- Steel Magnolias (play), a 1987 comedy–drama play by Robert Harling
- Steel Magnolias (2012 film), a 2012 American comedy-drama television film directed by Kenny Leon
- Birmingham Steel Magnolias, professional Women's Football Association team which played in the 2002–2003 season

== See also ==
- Steel Magnolia, American country music duo
- Steel Magnolia (EP), their self-titled extended play, released in 2010
- Steel Magnolia (album), their self-titled debut studio album, released in 2011
