= Valentine's Day (soundtrack) =

Valentine's Day (Original Motion Picture Soundtrack)

Soundtrack album by various artists
- Released: February 9, 2010
- Genre: Soundtrack; soul; country pop; pop rock
- Label: WaterTower; Big Machine
- Producer: Taylor Swift; Nathan Chapman; Dann Huff; Joss Stone; Jonathan Shorten; Conner Reeves; Mike Caren

Singles from Valentine's Day
- 1. "Stay Here Forever" Released: January 19, 2010; 2. "Today Was a Fairytale" Released: January 19, 2010

Valentine's Day (Original Motion Picture Soundtrack) is the official soundtrack to the 2010 film Valentine's Day, released on February 9, 2010, by WaterTower Music and Big Machine Records. The album includes contributions from country and pop artists, including Big Machine artists Taylor Swift, Jewel, and Steel Magnolia.

== Content ==
"Keep On Lovin' You" was recorded by Steel Magnolia, the second-season winners of the talent show Can You Duet, on its self-titled debut extended play. The song has reached Top 10 on the Billboard country charts.

Taylor Swift has two cuts: "Jump Then Fall" (from the Platinum Edition (2009) of her second studio album Fearless (2008)) and "Today Was a Fairytale," both of which had previously been released as digital singles. Jewel's "Stay Here Forever" was also released to country radio in advance of the album's release.

== Critical reception ==
Jessica Phillips of Country Weekly gave the soundtrack three stars out of five, saying that "no sound track about love is complete without country music" and praising the cuts by Swift, Jewel and Steel Magnolia, but adding that it "could have mined a little deeper into country music's rich vault."

== Track list ==
No.	Title	Writer(s)	Artist(s)	Length
1.	"Today Was a Fairytale"	Taylor Swift	Taylor Swift	4:02
2.	"Say Hey (I Love You)"	Michael Franti, Carl Rogers Young	Michael Franti & Spearhead	3:56
3.	"I'm in the Mood for Love"	Dorthy Fields, Jimmy McHugh	Jools Holland & Jamiroquai	3:10
4.	"On the Street Where You Live"	Alan Jay Lerner, Frederick Loewe	Willie Nelson	2:57
5.	"Everyday"	Buddy Holly, Norman Petty	Sausalito Foxtrot	1:37
6.	"Stay Here Forever"	Bobby Pinson, Dallas Davidson, Jewel	Jewel	2:59
7.	"Amor"	Gabriel Galindo Ruiz, Ricardo Mendez Lopez, Sunny Skylar	Ben E. King	2:55
8.	"Cupid"	Sam Cooke	Amy Winehouse	3:48
9.	"The Way You Look Tonight" (iTunes Live Session Performance)	Dorothy Fields, Jerome Kern	Maroon 5	3:25
10.	"4 and 20"	Conner Reeves, Jonathan Nicholas Shorten, Joss Stone	Joss Stone	5:07
11.	"Valentino"	Diane Birch	Diane Birch	2:50
12.	"Te Quiero, Dijiste"	Maria Grever	Nat King Cole	2:39
13.	"Jump then Fall"	Taylor Swift	Taylor Swift	3:58
14.	"Shine" (Radio Mix)	Eric Ronick, Than Luu	Black Gold	3:49
15.	"Keep On Lovin' You"	Chris Stapleton, Trent Willmon	Steel Magnolia	3:02
16.	"Somebody to Love"	Leighton Meester, Robin Thicke	Leighton Meester feat. Robin Thicke	3:34
17.	"I'm into Something Good"	Carole King, Gerry Goffin	The Bird and the Bee	2:49
18.	"Signed, Sealed, Delivered I'm Yours"	Lee Garrett, Lula Mae Hardway, Stevie Wonder, Syreet Wright	Anju Ramapriyam	2:32

== Chart performance ==
Chart (2010)	Peak position
U.S. Billboard 200	20
U.S. Billboard Top Soundtracks	2
Canadian Albums Chart	32
