= Nothing Has Changed (disambiguation) =

Nothing Has Changed is a 2014 compilation album by David Bowie.

Nothing Has Changed may also refer to:

- "Nothing Has Changed", 1978 song by Shirley
- "Nothing Has Changed", 1991 song by Galliano
- "Nothing Has Changed", 1999 song by Digital Underground from The Lost Files
- "Nothing Has Changed", 2008 song by Paperdoll from Ballad Nerd Pop
- Nothing Has Changed, 1975 poetry collection by Kenneth Patchen
- Nothing Has Changed, 1981 poetry collection by Rosmarie Waldrop

== See also ==
- Nothing's Changed (disambiguation)
