= Steel Magnolia (EP) =

EP by Steel Magnolia
- Released: February 23, 2010
- Genre: Country
- Length: 18:06
- Label: Big Machine
- Producer: Dann Huff

Steel Magnolia chronology
Steel Magnolia (2010)	Steel Magnolia (2011)

Professional ratings
Review scores
Source	Rating
Country Weekly	3/5 stars

Steel Magnolia EP is a 5-song extended play released on February 23, 2010, by country music duo Steel Magnolia. The EP features the duo's debut single, "Keep On Lovin' You", which reached the top 20 on the U.S. Billboard Hot Country Songs chart. It also features the song "Ooh La La" which they performed on Can You Duet. Also included are two additional live cover songs, "I Need You" (originally performed by Tim McGraw and Faith Hill), and "Fast as You", originally sung by Dwight Yoakam.

== Critical reception ==
Jessica Phillips of Country Weekly rated the EP three stars out of five, saying it "offers a taste of what fans[…]loved about these winners" and "will leave fans longing for a full album."

== Track listing ==
No.	Title	Writer(s)	Length
1.	"Keep On Lovin' You"	Chris Stapleton, Trent Willmon	3:03
2.	"Ooh La La"	Joshua Scott Jones	3:36
3.	"Edge of Goodbye"	Jones, Meghan Linsey	4:30
4.	"I Need You" (live)	David Lee, Tony Lane	3:44
5.	"Fast as You" (live)	Dwight Yoakam	3:13

== Chart performance ==
Chart (2010)	Peak position
U.S. Billboard Top Country Albums	47
U.S. Billboard Top Heatseekers	33
