= Sawyer Fredericks =

American singer–songwriter

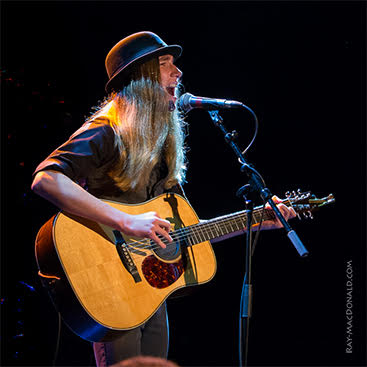
- Sawyer Fredericks at Bowery Music Hall, New York City, 2015

Background information
- Born: Sawyer Christopher Fredericks; March 31, 1999 (age 27); Newtown, Connecticut, U.S.
- Genres: Folk; Blues
- Occupations: Contemporary Folk Singer and Songwriter
- Instruments: Guitar; Vocals
- Years active: 2012–present
- Label: Independent (Previously with Republic Records)
- Website: www.sawyerfredericks.com

Sawyer Christopher Fredericks (born March 31, 1999) is an American blues singer–songwriter who won the 8th season of The Voice in 2015. Choosing Pharrell Williams as his coach, Fredericks set series iTunes sales records and became the youngest male winner in the history of the competition at age 16. (Note: Fredericks was later surpassed as the youngest winner of The Voice by Brynn Cartelli, who won Season 14 at age 15. After Cartelli, Carter Rubin, who won Season 19 at age of 15.)

Fredericks released an EP, Sawyer Fredericks, on November 28, 2015; the EP reached #2 on the Billboard Folk chart. In May 2016, he released the LP A Good Storm, which debuted at #2 on the Billboard Folk chart. Fredericks completed a 49-show US tour to support A Good Storm. He released another LP, Hide Your Ghost, on March 30, 2018. Another LP, Flowers for You, followed on May 1, 2020.

== Early life ==
Fredericks was born to Kirsten L. and Carl F. Fredericks on March 31, 1999, in Newtown, Connecticut, the youngest of three brothers. At age eight, his family moved to an 88-acre farm near Fultonville, New York. He was home-schooled using the Unschooling method.

At age 11, Fredericks received voice training and began performing regionally at farmers markets, open mics, community events, and folk clubs (such as The Bitter End in New York City). He was a finalist in the Young Artist Talent Search in Pawling, New York in 2012.

== Career ==
=== First recordings ===
In 2012, Fredericks recorded a demo of six original songs, entitled Breaking Ice. On June 4, 2013, he independently released his first studio album, Out My Window, consisting of 15 original tracks.

=== The Voice (2015) ===
From February to May 2015, Fredericks competed on the 8th season of The Voice. Talent scouts from the show invited him to participate in pre-show auditions after noticing YouTube videos of his singing. On his televised blind audition he sang "Man of Constant Sorrow", a traditional folksong he had earlier adapted to perform while busking. Coaches Adam Levine, Pharrell Williams, and Christina Aguilera turned their chairs around within ten seconds, and Blake Shelton joined them 40 seconds later. Fredericks chose Williams as his coach.

In his Battle round, Fredericks teamed up with Noelle Bybee to sing Creedence Clearwater Revival's "Have You Ever Seen the Rain" and was chosen by Williams to advance. In his Knockout round, Fredericks sang in a three-way match with Mia Z. and Paul Pfau, after Anthony Riley withdrew from the competition. Fredericks' performance of Howie Day's "Collide" earned him (along with Mia Z.) an advance into the Top 20.

In the Playoff rounds, Fredericks advanced to the Top 12 covering Ray LaMontagne's "Trouble", and to the Top 10 with John Lennon's "Imagine". Falsetto notes in the latter presented a challenge to Fredericks, whose voice was changing. He received the first iTunes Singles Chart top 10 multiplier bonus of the competition with "Imagine", reaching the second position by the close of the voting window. He advanced to the Top Eight with Goo Goo Dolls' "Iris" (reaching the fourth position on iTunes, edged out by Koryn Hawthorne at third), and to the Top Six with Lynyrd Skynyrd's "Simple Man" (reaching the second position on iTunes).

In the Top Six, Fredericks performed Al Green's "Take Me to the River" (reaching the tenth position on iTunes), featuring an energetic teen dance troupe surrounding the more reserved singer. For his Mother's Day dedication song, Fredericks was allowed (in a rare move by The Voice) to choose a song which hadn't been released by a major label, May Erlewine's "Shine On". In a further twist, Erlewine revealed that while giving permission for use of the song, she was nevertheless a strong backer of The Voice competitor Joshua Davis. "Shine On" rose to the third position on iTunes, the highest rated song on The Voice that week. The day after the Top Six results show, he returned to New York for a homecoming visit, participating in a parade and performance of three songs before over 4,000 people at Fonda Speedway (Fultonville, New York), and an evening concert at the Palace Theatre.

In the Top Five, Fredericks' covers of Christina Perri's "A Thousand Years" and Buffalo Springfield's "For What It's Worth" both garnered him the highest ratings of the week, reaching the second and third positions on iTunes, respectively.

For the May 18, 2015, finale show, Fredericks released the single "Please" (an original song written by Ray LaMontagne) and an accompanying music video. For his duet selection, Fredericks and Williams performed the Seals and Crofts tune "Summer Breeze". The show ended with Fredericks' cover of Neil Young's "Old Man". By noon the next day, "Summer Breeze" had reached the nineteenth position on iTunes, "Old Man" the third, and "Please" the second.

On the May 19, 2015, results show, Fredericks shared the stage with John Fogerty in a medley of Creedence Clearwater Revival hits — "Born on the Bayou", "Bad Moon Rising" and "Have You Ever Seen the Rain?". Apparent audio problems affected the broadcast. Fredericks was declared the winner at the end of the show, with Meghan Linsey second, Joshua Davis third, and Koryn Hawthorne fourth. Winning contestants receive $100,000 and a recording contract with Republic Records.

According to Republic, Fredericks broke many series sales records for The Voice, with ten singles reaching the iTunes top 10, and 14 singles charting in the Top 200 during the final week. A total of nearly one million digital singles were sold in the course of the show. Throughout the competition Fredericks maintained a strong social media presence, with leading numbers of followers on Facebook, Twitter, and Instagram.

At age 16, Fredericks became the youngest person to win The Voice; previously, the youngest winner had been Danielle Bradbery in Season 4. His record would later be surpassed by Brynn Cartelli, who won Season 14 at age 15. Later in 2020, Carter Rubin who won Season 19 at age of 15.

==== Chart of The Voice performances ====
Studio version of performance reached the top 10 on iTunes

Stage	Song	Original Artist	Date	Order	Result
Blind Audition	"I'm a Man of Constant Sorrow"	Dick Burnett	Feb. 23, 2015	1.11	All Four Chairs Turned. Joined Team Pharrell
Battles (Top 48)	"Have You Ever Seen the Rain" (vs. Noelle Bybee)	Creedence Clearwater Revival	March 17, 2015	9.2	Saved by Pharrell
Knockouts (Top 32)	"Collide" (vs. Mia Z & Paul Pfau)	Howie Day	March 23, 2015	10.4	Saved by Pharrell
Live Playoffs (Top 20)	"Trouble"	Ray LaMontagne	April 6, 2015	14.10	Saved by Public Vote
Live Top 12	"Imagine"	John Lennon	April 13, 2015	17.6	Saved by Public Vote
Live Top 10	"Iris"	Goo Goo Dolls	April 20, 2015	19.9	Saved by Public Vote
Live Top 8	"Simple Man"	Lynyrd Skynyrd	April 27, 2015	21.6	Saved by Public Vote
Live Top 6	"Shine On"	May Erlewine	May 4, 2015	23.6	Saved by Public Vote
Live Top 6	"Take Me to the River"	Al Green	May 4, 2015	23.11	Saved by Public Vote
Live Top 5 (Semi-Finals)	"For What It's Worth"	Buffalo Springfield	May 11, 2015	25.5	Saved by Public Vote
Live Top 5 (Semi-Finals)	"A Thousand Years"	Christina Perri	May 11, 2015	25.10	Saved by Public Vote
Live Finale (Final 4)	"Old Man"	Neil Young	May 18, 2015	27.12	Winner
Live Finale (Final 4)	"Summer Breeze" (with Pharrell Williams)	Seals and Crofts	May 18, 2015	27.3	Winner
Live Finale (Final 4)	"Please"	Sawyer Fredericks	May 18, 2015	27.5	Winner

=== 2015–2016: A Good Storm and touring ===
In May 2015, following his win on The Voice, Fredericks signed a recording contract with Republic Records. He performed on June 6, 2015, as a headliner at FLY92.3 Summer Jam 2015 in Saratoga Springs, New York. During the summer of 2015, Fredericks performed at the New York State Fair, Festival for the Lake, and opened for Trace Adkins at the Fonda Fair; he also performed with former The Voice contestant Mia Zanotti at the Mercury Lounge in New York City on September 20, 2015, and with Meghan Lindsey at the City Winery in Nashville on October 12, 2015. On October 23, 2015, the album "Magic Strings of Frankie Presto: A Musical Companion to the Novel by Mitch Albom" was released and included the song "Forever Wrong (Frankie & Aurora's Love Theme)", co-written and recorded by Fredericks. He opened for A Great Big World at the famed Troubadour in West Hollywood, California, on November 6, 2015. Fredericks released his first EP, self-titled "Sawyer Fredericks," on November 28, 2015, which reached #2 on the Billboard Folk chart. He then opened for Good Old War for three shows (in Boston, New York, and Philadelphia) in December, 2015.

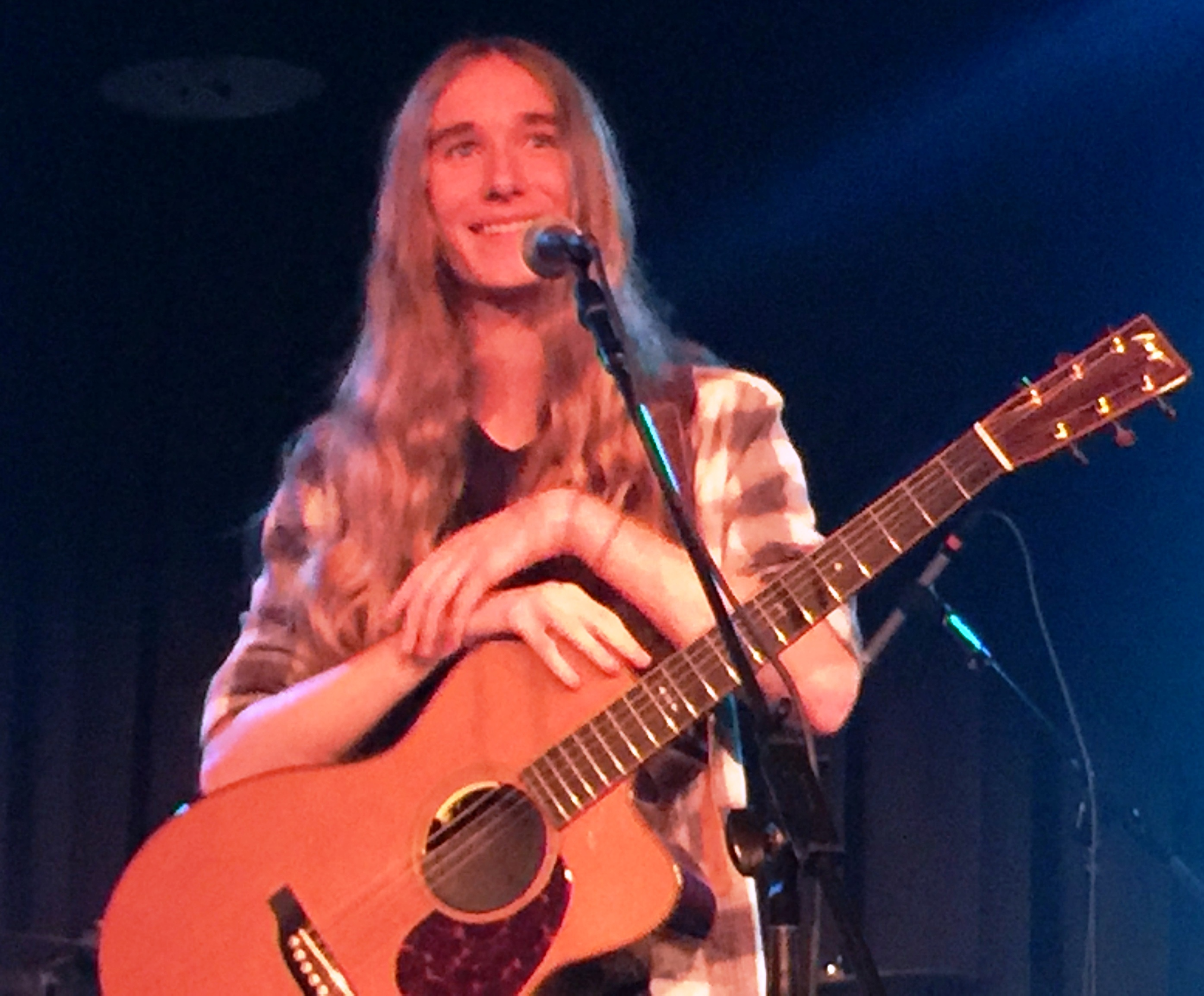
Sawyer Fredericks at The Birchmere in Alexandria, VA on September 4, 2016

Fredericks started 2016 by opening for Langhorne Slim & The Law at four shows on the US West Coast. In February, his video for the single "Take It All" was released and he debuted his newly formed band at the Towne Crier in Beacon, New York. Band members include Chris Morrison on guitar, Arthur Lee Fredericks on bass, and Bob Henderson on drums. On March 11, 2016, Fredericks performed at the legendary Levon Helm Studios ("The Barn") in Woodstock, NY. Later in March, Fredericks was presented with a custom Bourgeois OMSC guitar that was a gift from his fans, known as "Team Sawyer." In May 2016, Fredericks returned to The Voice to perform his second single "4 Pockets," after which he embarked on a 14-city west coast headlining tour. On May 13, 2016, his LP "A Good Storm" was released (Republic Records), debuting at #2 on the Billboard Folk chart and selling 11,000 copies in the US in its first week. Reviewer Kira Grunenberg said "The musical aesthetics that take shape over A Good Storm are plentiful, which immediately removes Fredericks from the stable of a one-trick pony." In his review of the single "4 Pockets," Michael Slezak, of TV Line, stated "Who knew the shiny, happy teenager had such a well of dark lyrics, darkly delivered, within him? I dig!" "A Good Storm" saw Fredericks in collaboration with producers Dan Romer, Saul Simon MacWilliams, Mikal Blue, Johan "Izy" Lindbrandt, Jamie Hartman, Jayson Dezuzio, and Pharrell Williams, as well as co-writers Dan Romer, Saul Simon MacWilliams, Dave Bassett, Mikal Blue, Johan "Izy" Lindbrandt, Shari Short, Jamie Hartman, Jayson Dezuzio, Whitney Phillips, Tara Lee, and Foy Vance.

Fredericks completed a US tour to support "A Good Storm" with 49 shows across the US, from May through September, 2016. On October 8, 2016, he sang the National Anthem and performed at the Patriot Awards Gala at the Medal of Honor Convention in Minneapolis, MN. Olivia Millerschin and Fredericks recorded a duet of her song "When," which was released on her album "Look Both Ways" on September 23, 2016. In November 2016, Fredericks announced a December "Winter Storm Tour" to 12 cities in the Eastern US with guests Mia Z. and Gabriel Wolfchild & The Northern Light.

=== 2017–2018: Hide Your Ghost and touring ===
On January 12, 2017, Fredericks announced that he had become an independent artist, having parted ways with Republic Records and Mick Management in an "amicable and mutual decision." Fredericks' mother is taking over management and Fredericks is planning an independent album and 2017 tour. Later that month, Fredericks performed the national anthem at the 2017 ECHL All-Star Classic in Glens Falls, NY.

On April 1, 2017, Fredericks participated in the 518 Songfest, a fund raiser for a local radio station and the Columbia Arts Team, at The Egg in Albany, NY. Later in the month, on April 27, 2017, he headed up the 2017 Move Music Festival at Cohoes Music Hall in Albany, NY. He was joined by his new touring band: Art Fredericks on bass, Chris Thomas on drums, and Jerome Goosman on guitar.

Fredericks announced on May 5, 2017, that he was at Dreamland Recording Studios creating his new album to be titled Hide Your Ghost and that he will soon be touring, joined by The Voice alumn Gabriel Wolfchild and the Northern Lights, and American Idol alum Haley Johnson. On May 8, 2017, Fredericks released some of the Hide Your Ghost tour dates, indicating that he would tour through the US and into Canada, from June to December 2017.

Fredericks' original song Silent World was featured on the season 6 debut of the Netflix original series Longmire, which debuted November 17, 2017.

Fredericks released his independently produced album, Hide Your Ghost, On March 30, 2018. The official video was released March 2, 2018; it was directed and animated by paper cut and stop motion animation artist Andrew Benincasa.

Frederick's song This Fire was covered by John Ondrasik on an episode of the TV show Code Black that aired on May 30, 2018.

=== 2019–present: Flowers for You and touring ===
On May 1, 2020, Fredericks released his album Flowers for You. Due to COVID-19 pandemic restrictions, he and his band refrained from live touring to support the album until Fall 2021, when he embarked on a tour from Michigan to the East Coast and Southeast US with co-headliners The Accidentals, who had contributed strings to two songs on Flowers for You: "Lies You Tell" and "Days Go By".

== Philanthropy ==
Fredericks has performed and/or given support to a number of charitable causes. Before winning The Voice, he performed in a showcase at the Youth Arts Forum at the Bitter End in New York City on June 7, 2014, to benefit the YAF and the Cystic Fibrosis Foundation. He also performed at a benefit for the Glen Volunteer Fire Department on February 28, 2015. Shortly after winning The Voice in May 2015, he performed "Imagine" for a crowd on Red Nose Day (May 21, 2015) in New York City to raise money for poverty-stricken children. On September 3, 2015, he performed at a gala and auctioned off a signed guitar to raise money for St. Jude's Children's Research Hospital. Fredericks contributed to raising over $1 million for Detroit's neediest citizens when he appeared at the Fourth Annual S.A.Y. Detroit Radiothon hosted by Mitch Albom on December 10, 2015. A signed hat worn by him on The Voice was auctioned off to raise funds for the charity. In December 2016, his donation of the red jacket he wore on The Voice fetched $7,000 at the Fifth Annual S.A.Y. Detroit Radiothon.

After the 2016 flood in Louisiana, Fredericks teamed up with his "Voice" alum and Louisiana native, Meghan Linsey, to collect Louisiana flood relief donations at his concerts in late summer of 2016. Fredericks contributed signed CDs and a signed hat he wore on The Voice to be auctioned off to benefit the Sean Craig Memorial Fund. Fredericks played for a crowd of nearly 1,000 in Gloversville, NY on October 28, 2016, to benefit Mountain Valley Hospice, where he was awarded with the Gregory R. Hoye Award.

Fredericks performed a solo acoustic show for pediatric patients at Albany Medical Center in Albany, NY, on April 11, 2017. On May 26, 27, and 28, 2017, he performed solo to sold-out crowds at Caffe Lena in Saratoga Springs, NY. The performances were professionally video taped and will be aired as pay-per-view, with part of the proceeds going toward the historic venue.

On June 3, 2018, Fredericks held a fundraising concert at the Glove Theater in Gloversville, NY, to aid the theater with its ongoing restoration projects. The event coincided with the release of Fredericks's video for his song "Gasoline" on Yahoo Entertainment.

== Personal life ==
In 2022, Fredericks announced that he is bisexual.

== Discography ==
=== Extended plays ===
Title	Details	Peak chart positions				Sales
Title	Details	US	US Rock	US Folk	CAN	Sales
Sawyer Fredericks	Released: November 11, 2015; Label: Republic Records	49	3	2	96	US: 22,000

=== Albums ===
Title	Details	Peak chart positions				Sales
Title	Details	US	US Rock	US Folk	US Indie	Sales
The Voice: The Complete Season 8 Collection	Release date: May 19, 2015; Label: Republic Records	6	8	1	—	US: 41,000
A Good Storm	Release date: May 13, 2016; Label: Republic Records	48	5	2	—	US: 11,000
Hide Your Ghost	Release date: March 30, 2018; Label: Dreamland Recording Studios	—	—	—	23	
Flowers for You	Release date: May 1, 2020; Label: Dreamland Recording Studios	—	—	—	—	

=== Singles ===
Year	Title	Peak chart positions				Album
Year	Title	US	US Rock	US Country	CAN	Album
2015	"I'm a Man of Constant Sorrow"	—	—	33	—	The Voice: The Complete; Season 8 Collection
2015	"Collide"	—	34	—	—	The Voice: The Complete; Season 8 Collection
2015	"Trouble"	112	12	—	—	The Voice: The Complete; Season 8 Collection
2015	"Imagine"	98	8	—	—	The Voice: The Complete; Season 8 Collection
2015	"Iris"	100	10	—	—	The Voice: The Complete; Season 8 Collection
2015	"Simple Man"	71	6	—	82	The Voice: The Complete; Season 8 Collection
2015	"Take Me to the River"	—	19	—	—	The Voice: The Complete; Season 8 Collection
2015	"Shine On"	99	10	—	—	The Voice: The Complete; Season 8 Collection
2015	"For What It's Worth"	104	10	—	—	The Voice: The Complete; Season 8 Collection
2015	"A Thousand Years"	94	—	—	—	The Voice: The Complete; Season 8 Collection
2015	"Old Man"	63	6	—	99	The Voice: The Complete; Season 8 Collection
2015	"Please"	37	3	—	60	The Voice: The Complete; Season 8 Collection
2015	"Take it All"	—	—	—	—	"A Good Storm"
2016	"4 Pockets"	—	—	—	—	"A Good Storm"
2018	"Silent World"	-	-	-	-	"Hide Your Ghost"
2018	"Any of My Trouble"	-	-	-	-	"Hide Your Ghost"
"—" denotes releases that did not chart

=== Music videos ===
Year	Video	Director
2016	"Take It All"	Chris Acosta
2018	"Hide Your Ghost"	Andrew Benincasa
2018	"Gasoline"	

== Awards and nominations ==
Year	Presenter	Award	Result
2015	NBC The Voice	The Voice	Won
2016	Reality TV Awards	Best Performance "Old Man" on The Voice	Won
