= Last Night Again =

Single by Steel Magnolia

from the album Steel Magnolia
- Released: December 7, 2010
- Genre: Country
- Length: 3:54
- Label: Big Machine
- Songwriters: Joshua Scott Jones; Meghan Linsey; Hillary Lindsey
- Producer: Dann Huff

Steel Magnolia singles chronology
"Just By Being You (Halo and Wings)" (2010)	"Last Night Again" (2010)	"Bulletproof" (2011)

"Last Night Again" is a song written by Steel Magnolia members Joshua Scott Jones and Meghan Linsey, along with Hillary Lindsey. The song was recorded by Steel Magnolia for their self-titled debut album. The song is the third single from the album, and was sent to country radio on December 6, 2010. It was officially released on iTunes the next day. It debuted on the Hot Country Songs charts at number 59 for the Billboard chart week ending January 1, 2011.

== Critical reception ==
Bobby Peacock of Roughstock gave the song four stars out of five. He thought that the duo's real-life chemistry was far more evident in this song than it was on "Keep On Lovin' You". He also went on to add that he could see it as being a sequel to Lady Antebellum's "Lookin' for a Good Time".

== Music video ==
The video, which was directed by Peter Zavadil, was released in December 2010. In the video, the members of Steel Magnolia are shown in a bowling alley, facing off against one another in efforts to impress the other.

== Chart performance ==
"Last Night Again" debuted at number 59 on the U.S. Billboard Hot Country Songs charts for the week ending January 1, 2011.

Chart (2010–2011)	Peak position
US Hot Country Songs (Billboard)	24
US Billboard Bubbling Under Hot 100	22

=== Year-end charts ===
Chart (2011)	Position
US Country Songs (Billboard)	92
