= Black Gold (band) =

American indie rock band

- Origin: Brooklyn, New York, U.S.
- Genres: Indie rock
- Years active: 2006–present
- Label: Red Bull Records
- Members: Eric Ronick; Than Luu; Marty O'Kane; Nate Allen
- Past members: Eugene; Siggy Sjursen; Shiben Bhattacharya; Alistair Paxton; Kerry Wayne-James
- Website: www.blackgoldmusic.com

Black Gold is an American indie rock band, from Brooklyn, New York formed by Eric Ronick (lead vocals, keyboards) and Than Luu (drums, guitar, percussions, vocals) in 2006. The band started as a project was started after touring with M. Ward, Ambulance LTD, Rachael Yamagata, Panic! at the Disco, and Adam Franklin of Swervedriver. The formation followed with writing and recording at Ronick's Thinman Studios in Brooklyn, that culminated in the release of their debut album, Rush, released on February 3, 2009. Singles from the album include "Detroit", "Shine" and "Plans & Reveries", with the latter their signature song, explained as to convey the idea that some ideas are stuck to and followed while others become reveries and are never accomplished, and is noted for featuring on The CW's One Tree Hill episode; "Deep Ocean Vast Sea" (aired on October 19, 2009), and "Shine" was featured on the seventh season of So You Think You Can Dance as the farewell song. They performed live on the season finale of the show, on August 12, 2010, where Ronick began the song by playing piano, but quickly abandoned it to instead pursue a solo vocal montage of the season's emotional moments. "Shine" was also featured in the 2010 film Valentine's Day and appears on the soundtrack.

== Rush ==
Rush

Studio album by Black Gold
- Released: February 20, 2009
- Recorded: Thinman Studios
- Genre: Indie rock
- Length: 48:05
- Labels: Red Bull; Parlophone
- Producers: Eric Ronick; Than Luu; Vincenzo LoRusso

Rush is the debut and only studio album of Black Gold produced by Eric Ronick, Than Luu and Vincenzo LoRusso, recorded at Thinman Studios in Brooklyn, N.Y. and released on February 20, 2009.

"Rush"
No.	Title	Length
1.	"Detroit"	4:04
2.	"Plans & Reveries"	4:44
3.	"Breakdown"	4:37
4.	"What You Did"	4:02
5.	"Silver"	3:43
6.	"Shine"	4:17
7.	"Idols"	4:05
8.	"The Comedown"	3:35
9.	"Run"	3:58
10.	"Canyon"	6:31
11.	"After The Flood"	4:25

== Band members ==
=== Current ===
- Eric Ronick – lead vocals, keyboard, guitar (2006–present)
- Than Luu – drums, percussion, backing vocals (2006–present)

=== Current touring ===
- Marty O'Kane – guitar (2012–present)
- Nate Allen – bass (2012–present)

=== Former touring ===
- Eugene – bass (2006–Unknown)
- Siggy Sjursen – bass (Unknown–2008)
- Shiben Bhattacharya – bass (2008–2009)
- Alistair Paxton – guitar, backing vocals (Unknown–2012)
- Kerry Wayne-James – bass (2009–2012)
