= Mercury Lounge =

Music venue in New York City, US

Mercury Lounge NYC
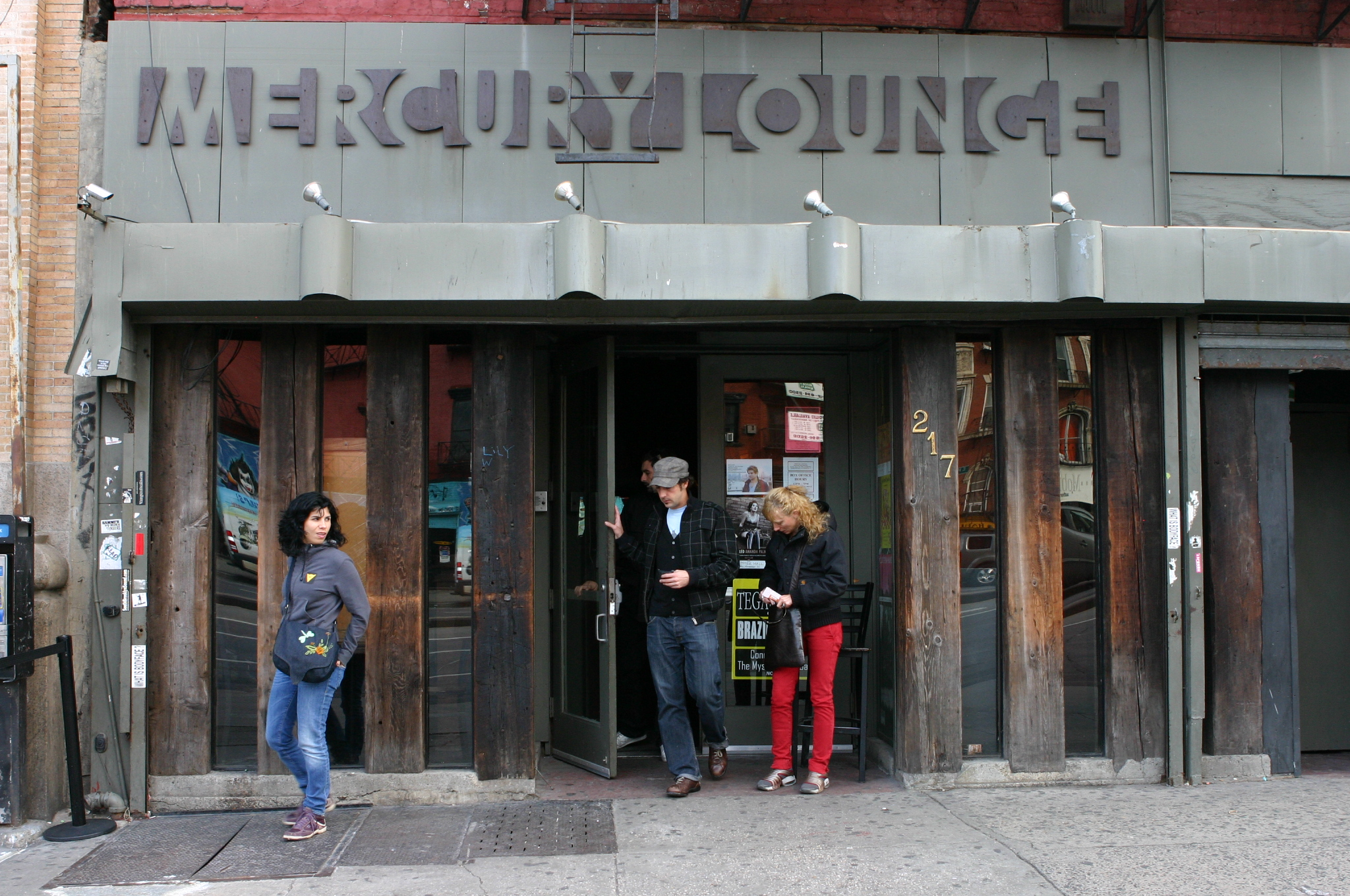
- Mercury Lounge exterior in 2008
- Interactive map of Mercury Lounge NYC
- Address: 217 E Houston St
- Location: New York, NY 10002, U.S.
- Coordinates: 40.7220°N 73.98682°W
- Owner: Michael Swier, Michael Winsch, Brian Swier
- Seating type: standing only
- Capacity: 250
- Type: Live Music Venue / Nightclub / Bar
- Event: Music

Construction
- Opened: 1993
- Renovated: 1992
- Architect: Brian Swier

Website
- mercuryloungenyc.com

The Mercury Lounge is a live music venue on the Lower East Side of Manhattan in New York City. Like its brother venue The Bowery Ballroom, The Mercury Lounge is celebrated as an iconic indie venue due to its acoustics, its fostering and even launching of upcoming artists, and its no-frills, rock n' roll presentation. It has made numerous top-ten lists over the years including that of Billboard Magazine. It has a capacity of 250 people. A scholarly account of Mercury Lounge and its place in the wider history of the city's rock music history and Lower Manhattan was published in 2020.

== History ==
The Mercury Lounge was founded in 1993 by Michael Swier, Michael Winsch, and Brian Swier, the three of whom went on to open a string of venues and promotions companies in New York City and Los Angeles. The Mercury Lounge is an independent indie venue to this day, and is known for launching the careers of many talented bands.

In 2016, the Mercury Lounge, the Bowery Ballroom, and its founders parted ways with promotions company Bowery Presents when it was acquired by AEG. The Bowery Presents was cofounded in 2004-05 by Michael Swier, John Moore, Michael Winsch, and Brian Swier in order to promote live shows in open venues.

The Mercury Lounge and The Bowery Ballroom retained their independence and are no longer affiliated with the Bowery Presents and book their own shows. The two clubs have formed joint ventures with Live Nation.

The building in which the Mercury Lounge resides has an interesting history. Located at 217 East Houston Street, the space once housed the servants to the Astor mansion on Fifth Avenue, and even connected to it via an underground labyrinth of tunnels. In the early part of the 20th century, Garfein's Restaurant occupied the space, and from 1933 to 1993 the storefront housed a tombstone seller.

== Notable acts ==
In 2000, the New York City band The Strokes got their start after playing the Mercury Lounge. Ryan Gentles, the Mercury Lounge's booker, quit his job to become the band's manager. Other acts include Radiohead, Chris Martin, Arcade Fire, Lady Gaga, Katy Perry, the Yeah Yeah Yeahs, Lana Del Rey, Interpol, Palomar, Rival Schools, PaperDoll, Sarah Kinsley, Hayes Warner, Mates of State, The Remnants, and numerous others.
