= Nothing's Changed =

Nothing's Changed may refer to:

- Nothing's Changed (poem), a poem by Tatamkhulu Afrika
- Nothing's Changed (album), an album by Joe Lynn Turner
- "Nothing's Changed', a 2001 song by the Calling from Camino Palmero

== See also ==
- Nothing Has Changed (disambiguation)
