= Ballad Nerd Pop =

Studio album by Paperdoll
- Released: 2008
- Genre: Indie rock, alternative rock, indie pop
- Producer: Nic Hard

Ballad Nerd Pop is the debut studio album by American alternative rock band Paperdoll. It was recorded in 2008 at Bushwick Studios, Brooklyn with producer Nic Hard (The Bravery, Aberdeen City).

Paperdoll first received national attention when the first song on the album, If Nothing Happened, appeared in a TV commercial for Vicks Dayquil in October 2009.

== Track listing ==
_{All tracks by T. Chaisiri except where noted}

1. "If Nothing Happened" – 3:00
2. "I Know" (Chaisiri, Patrick Moloney) – 3:55
3. "Get To Know Me" – 3:19
4. "Anything At All – 3:12
5. "How Perfect" – 3:23
6. "She Said" – 3:37
7. "Nothing Has Changed" (Moloney) – 3:02
8. "Everything Is Fine" – 3:24
9. "Wiser" – 2:49
10. "Beautiful Face" – 3:37

== Personnel ==
- Teresa Lee – vocals, keyboard
- Patrick Moloney – guitar, vocals
- Jack Koch – bass
- Chip Thomas – drums
