= Joshua Scott Jones =

American singer-songwriter (born 1980)

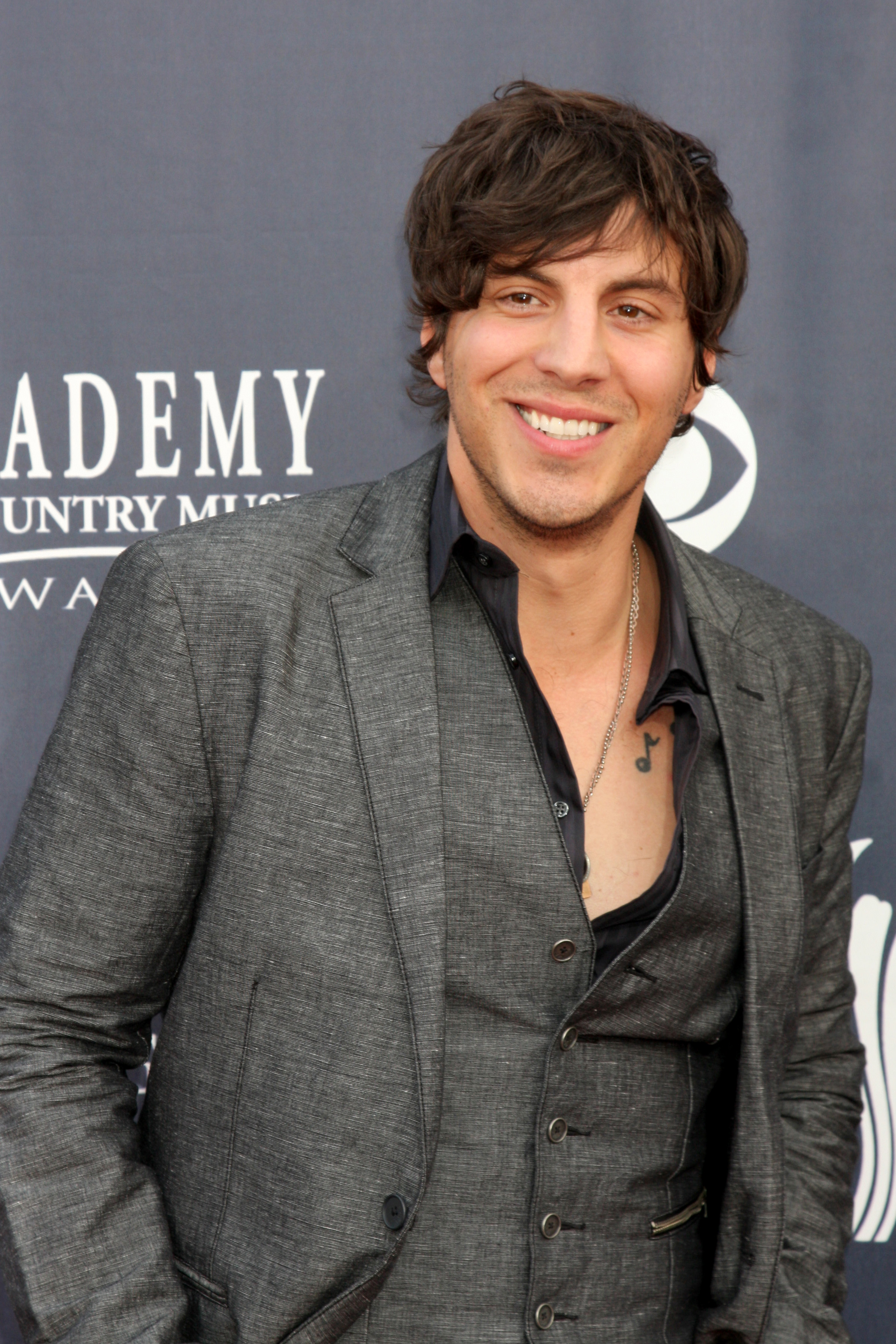
- Jones in 2010

Background information
- Born: Houston, Texas, United States
- Genres: Country, rock
- Occupation: Singer-songwriter
- Years active: 2009–present
- Formerly of: Steel Magnolia
- Website: www.joshuascottjonesmusic.com

Joshua Scott Jones is an American singer-songwriter. Jones was half of the duo Steel Magnolia and has released four solo albums as an independent musician. He plays guitar, bass, banjo, harmonica, drums, and piano.

== Early life ==
Though born in Houston, Texas he was brought up in Charleston, Illinois by his uncle Wesley Jones, who worked in a local factory and was a preacher on the weekends, and his adoptive mother Christie. Jones started working on a farm at the age of thirteen. Around the same time, his biological father, David Jones, gave him his first guitar. About a year later, Jones gave his first performance of an original song about racism, while attending the Second Baptist Church in Mattoon, IL.

After high school, Jones hit the road and became a street musician playing anywhere and everywhere he could for the next several years. He ended up in Los Angeles for a brief period, sleeping on the floor in a studio apartment on Hollywood Blvd while booking small, uncrowded shows at places like the Knitting Factory and the Viper Room.

In 2003, he landed a job in Nashville selling advertising for terrestrial radio and writing jingles for radio stations 102.9 The Buzz and 102.5 The Party.

During the winter of 2006, Jones met longtime girlfriend and fiancé Meghan Linsey. They began collaborating on music as a duo. Jones's solo music was playing regularly on Nashville radio station Lighting 100 before he began making music with Linsey full time.

== Music career ==
Over the next two years, Jones and Linsey went to London to record with producer Fraser T. Smith. After returning home to Nashville, they auditioned for a CMT production called Can You Duet, a reality singing competition. Judges Scott Borchetta, Big Kenny Alphin, and Naomi Judd selected the pair as season two winners. In the summer of 2009, they signed a record deal with Big Machine Records.

On January 11, 2011, Steel Magnolia released their self-titled debut album. The album went on to have 3 top 40 songs including the number 4 hit "Keep On Lovin' You" written by Chris Stapleton. Jones co-wrote seven of the twelve tracks the album, including the ballad "Glass Houses", which he wrote solo. Jones co-wrote the third single from the album, "Last Night Again", which peaked at number 24 on the country chart.

Steel Magnolia officially broke up in 2012 after Jones completed a rehabilitation program and the romantic relationship between Jones and Linsey ended.

While in rehab, Jones compiled a twelve-song debut record entitled The Healing, which received critical acclaim and nationwide news coverage. Jones co-wrote and executively produced the entire album. The lead single, "Honk (If You’re Tonky)", was written mainly by Jones's long time and late friend Joshua Alford. "Honk (If You’re Tonky)" aired on Sirius XM's The Highway, while the video was shown in rotation on CMT's Pure.

Since the recording of The Healing, Jones has released three additional studio albums, The Rural Deal, How the Story Goes, and a stripped-down acoustic record called Outlier Circa 1980. How the Story Goes includes the song "Honky Tonk Night". Jones says that he woke up from a dream with the melody and title for the song in his head. The video for "Honky Tonk Night" spent time in rotation on CMT Music.
