= Just By Being You (Halo and Wings) =

Single by Steel Magnolia

from the album Steel Magnolia
- Released: June 21, 2010
- Genre: Country
- Length: 4:00
- Label: Big Machine
- Songwriters: Britton Cameron, Patricia Conroy
- Producer: Dann Huff

Steel Magnolia singles chronology
"Keep On Lovin' You" (2009)	"Just By Being You (Halo and Wings)" (2010)	"Last Night Again" (2010)

"Just By Being You (Halo and Wings)" is a song written by Britton Cameron and Canadian country music singer Patricia Conroy, and recorded by American country music duo Steel Magnolia. It was released on July 20, 2010, as the second single from their self-titled debut album, which was released on January 11, 2011.

== Critical reception ==
Kevin John Coyne, of Country Universe, gave the song a "C" rating, stating that the song could put Matchbox Twenty fans to sleep. He also said that the duo could have come up with something worthy of their time and effort.

== Music video ==
The song was made into a music video, which premiered on Country Music Television on July 2, 2010. The video was directed by Kristin Barlowe. In the video, the duo perform in the middle of woods, while in the backdrop are two children playing. As the video progresses, special effects are used to simulate the children, as well as Steel Magnolia, turning into angels.

== Chart performance ==
"Just By Being You (Halo and Wings)" debuted on the Billboard Hot Country Songs chart in June 2010, prior to its official radio release. Since then, it has become Steel Magnolia's second Top 40 single on that chart. It peaked at number 25 on the country charts in November 2010.

Chart (2010)	Peak position
US Hot Country Songs (Billboard)	25
