= Steel Magnolia (album) =

Studio album by Steel Magnolia
- Released: January 11, 2011
- Genre: Country
- Length: 46:08
- Label: Big Machine
- Producer: Dann Huff

Steel Magnolia chronology
| Steel Magnolia — EP (2010) | Steel Magnolia (2011) |

Singles from Steel Magnolia
- 1. "Keep On Lovin' You" Released: September 14, 2009; 2. "Just By Being You (Halo and Wings)" Released: June 21, 2010; 3. "Last Night Again" Released: December 6, 2010; 4. "Bulletproof" Released: August 22, 2011

Steel Magnolia is the only studio album by American country music duo Steel Magnolia. The album was released on January 11, 2011, via Big Machine Records. Prior to the release of the album, the duo released an extended play titled Steel Magnolia — EP on February 23, 2010.

The album features each of Steel Magnolia's three singles: "Keep On Lovin' You", "Just By Being You (Halo and Wings)" and "Last Night Again". The first two singles both reached the Top 40 of the Billboard Hot Country Songs chart, while the third single was released on December 6, 2010.

"Homespun Love", a song co-written by Keith Urban, was originally recorded by him as a member of American band The Ranch, in 1997.

== Reception ==
=== Commercial ===
After many delays of the album's release, it charted within the Top 10 of the Billboard 200 and Billboard Top Country Albums, where it debuted at number 7 and number 3, respectively. In the album's opening week, it sold 28,346 copies in the United States. As of the chart dated April 2, 2011, the album has sold 93,493 copies in the US.

=== Critical ===
Professional ratings
Review scores
| Source | Rating |
|---|---|
| Allmusic | 2.5/5 stars |
| The Boston Globe | (favorable) |
| Country Weekly | 4/5 stars |
| Entertainment Weekly | (B) |
| Roughstock | 4/5 stars |
| Slant Magazine | 2/5 stars |
| Engine 145 | 3/5 stars |

Upon its release, Steel Magnolia received generally positive reviews from most music critics. At Metacritic, which assigns a normalized rating out of 100 to reviews from mainstream critics, the album received an average score of 68, based on 6 reviews, which indicates "generally favorable reviews".

Blake Boldt with Engine 145 gave it a three star rating, calling it "a promising start" and saying "Steel Magnolia suffers when the tempo slows. "Just By Being You (Halos and Wings)", a limp romantic ballad, is the worst offender, and the more serious cuts, full of overwrought emotions and overused sentiments, fall flat". Thom Jurek with Allmusic gave it a 2½ rating, and largely criticized the sound of the album, saying "Other than a banjo here and a fiddle or pedal steel there, this may be what passes for country music in the 21st century, but simply put, it's '80s-styled pop with different production".

Sarah Rodman with The Boston Globe was in favor of the album, saying "On their eponymous debut, the duo known as Steel Magnolia continue their winning ways combining her bluesy bruised angel rasp with his slick, keening country pop tenor". Matt Bjorke with Roughstock gave the release a four star rating, saying "While Steel Magnolia may not appeal to fans of the traditionally-minded music; it is nonetheless a solid collection of mainstream country music that introduces a charismatic and dynamic duo ready to become one of country music’s top duos". Jonathan Keefe with Slant Magazine was critical of the album, giving it a two star rating. He referred to the material on the album as "weak" saying "the songs on Steel Magnolia aren't the least bit noteworthy".

== Track listing ==
| No. | Title | Writer(s) | Length |
|---|---|---|---|
| 1. | "Ooh La La" | Joshua Scott Jones, Meghan Linsey | 3:28 |
| 2. | "Keep On Lovin' You" | Chris Stapleton, Trent Willmon | 3:02 |
| 3. | "Just By Being You (Halo and Wings)" | Britton Cameron, Patricia Conroy | 4:00 |
| 4. | "Edge of Goodbye" | Jones, Linsey, Julie Moriva | 4:25 |
| 5. | "Bulletproof" | Lori McKenna, Chris Tompkins | 3:49 |
| 6. | "Not Tonight" | Shane Stevens, Hillary Lindsey | 4:15 |
| 7. | "Last Night Again" | Jones, Linsey, Lindsey | 3:54 |
| 8. | "Without You" | Jones, Linsey, Van Asa Preston | 3:27 |
| 9. | "Rainbow" | Jones, Linsey, Tommy Henriksen, Chioma Eze | 4:30 |
| 10. | "Eggs Over Easy" | Jones, Linsey, Steffon Hamulak | 3:55 |
| 11. | "Homespun Love" | Keith Urban, Vernon Rust | 3:18 |
| 12. | "Glass Houses" | Jones | 4:05 |

iTunes bonus track
| No. | Title | Writer(s) | Length |
|---|---|---|---|
| 13. | "Without You" (acoustic version) | Jones, Linsey, Preston | 3:36 |

iTunes pre-order bonus tracks
| No. | Title | Writer(s) | Length |
|---|---|---|---|
| 14. | "Last Night Again" (acoustic version) | Jones, Linsey, Lindsey |
| 15. | "Keep On Lovin' You" (acoustic version) | Stapleton, Willmon |

== Personnel ==
=== Steel Magnolia ===
- Joshua Scott Jones- lead vocals, background vocals, harmonica
- Meghan Linsey- lead vocals, background vocals

=== Additional Musicians ===
- Tom Bukovac- acoustic guitar, electric guitar
- Eric Darken- percussion
- Dan Dugmore- dobro, steel guitar
- Shannon Forrest- drums
- Paul Franklin- dobro, steel guitar
- Dann Huff- banjo, bouzouki, 12-string acoustic guitar, acoustic guitar, electric guitar, mandolin, soloist
- Mike Johnson- steel guitar
- Charlie Judge- accordion, steel drums, Hammond B-3 organ, piano, synthesizer strings, synthesizer, Wurlitzer
- Chris McHugh- drums
- Rich Redmond- drums
- Adam Shoenfeld- electric guitar
- Jimmie Lee Sloas- bass guitar
- Ilya Toshinsky- banjo, acoustic guitar, mandolin, octave mandolin
- Jonathan Yudkin- cello, fiddle, mandolin

== Chart performance ==
=== Album ===
| Chart (2011) | Peak position |
|---|---|
| U.S. Billboard 200 | 7 |
| U.S. Billboard Top Country Albums | 3 |

=== Singles ===
| Year | Single | Peak chart positions | |
| Year | Single | US Country | US |
|---|---|---|---|
| 2009 | "Keep On Lovin' You" | 4 | 68 |
| 2010 | "Just By Being You (Halo and Wings)" | 25 | — |
| 2010 | "Last Night Again"^{A} | 24 | 122 |
| 2011 | "Bulletproof" | 47 | — |
"—" denotes releases that did not chart

- ^{A}Did not enter the Hot 100 but charted on Bubbling Under Hot 100 Singles.
