= Can You Duet =

Television series

- Created by: Henrik Hancke Nielsen
- Directed by: Ivan Dudynsky
- Presented by: Rossi Morreale; Lance Smith
- Judges: Naomi Judd; Brett Manning; Aimee Mayo; Big Kenny; Scott Borchetta
- Country of origin: United States
- Original language: English
- No. of seasons: 2
- No. of episodes: 19

Production
- Executive producers: Jeff Boggs; John Hamlin; Melanie Moreau; Bob Kusbit
- Running time: Varies
- Production company: FremantleMedia North America

Original release
- Network: CMT
- Release: April 14, 2008 – August 8, 2009

Can You Duet is an American reality competition television show on CMT. The show was produced by FremantleMedia, the same company that produces American Idol.

The show premiered on April 14, 2008, and the first season ended on June 13, 2008.

Sixwire, runners up from Fox's Next Great American Band, performed as the house band for Can You Duet with Steve Mandile serving as the show's musical director. Two additional musicians, Steve Hornbeak on keyboards and Andrea Young on violin, performed with Sixwire during the show. The show was cancelled after two seasons.

== Seasons ==
=== Season 1 (2008) ===
The show was hosted by Rossi Morreale, and the judge panel was made up of Naomi Judd, Brett Manning, and Aimee Mayo.

The eight finalist duos for season one were:

Duo	Place in competition
Caitlin Lynn and William Snyder	Winner
Nick Brownell and Jeremiah Richey	Runner Up
Rory and Joey Feek	3rd
Kate & Kacey Coppola (a.k.a. "The Coppolas")	4th
Jared Johnson and David Oakleaf	5th
Ruth Collins and Victoria Gibson (a.k.a. "Wild Honey")	6th
Chris Cline and Nathan Herron	7th
Lewis Brice and Gabriel Jordan	8th

Three of the season 1 finalists, Caitlin & Will, Kate & Kacey Coppola, and Joey + Rory, have signed record deals; Caitlin and Will with Columbia Nashville, Kate & Kacey with Big Machine, and Joey + Rory with Vanguard/Sugar Hill.

Caitlin & Will released their debut single, "Address in the Stars", on March 30, 2009. The single peaked at number 42 on the Billboard Hot Country Songs chart, and the duo subsequently broke up in October 2009 and their debut album went unreleased. Kate & Kacey released their debut single, "Dreaming Love", on April 27, 2009, via Big Machine. The single underperformed and the duo parted ways with Big Machine in early 2010 without releasing an album.

Joey + Rory, who finished in third place, were the most successful act from the first season. They released their debut single, "Cheater, Cheater", in September 2008, which reached a peak of number 30 on the Hot Country Songs chart. Their debut album, The Life of a Song, followed on October 28, 2008. Joey + Rory have released six further studio albums and a Christmas record, and produced one further chart single on the Hot Country Songs chart in "That's Important to Me," a number 51-peaking single in March 2011.

Lewis Brice is the younger brother of Curb Records artist Lee Brice.

=== Season 2 (2009) ===
Auditions for the second season began on March 7, 2009, and the show premiered on June 20, 2009. Over 5,000 auditioned, and was cut down to 10 duos for the show's competition.

Naomi Judd returned as a judge for season two, and Lance Smith from CMT's Top 20 Countdown became the new host. The other two seats in the judge panel were made up of Big Kenny (of Big & Rich) and Scott Borchetta (CEO of Big Machine Records).

Duo	Place in competition
Meghan Linsey & Josh Jones (a.k.a. "Steel Magnolia")	Winner
Brandon Green & Jonathan Cox (a.k.a. "JB Rocket")	Runner Up
Ryan Larkins & Avalon Peacock	3rd
Brad Stella & MaryLynne Stella (a.k.a. "The Stellas")	4th
Mark O'Shea & Jay O'Shea (a.k.a. "O'Shea")	5th
Keeira Lyn Ford & Matt Boggs	6th
Memarie Gayle & Kassie Miller	7th
Abby Fender & Holly Jackson	8th
Spencer Bartoletti & Dessa Zuccaro (a.k.a. "Harmon Creek")	9th
Chelsee Oaks & Rob Bolin	10th

Having won the competition, Steel Magnolia signed a recording contract with Big Machine Records; their debut single, "Keep on Lovin' You", was released in August 2009, and their self-titled debut album followed with a January 2011 release. The album produced three further chart singles in "Just By Being You (Halo and Wings)," "Last Night Again," and "Bulletproof." In January 2012, Steel Magnolia ended their relationship with Big Machine. Meghan Linsey appeared on the eighth season of The Voice, coming in as the runner-up.

The Stellas and O'Shea found success in their home countries (Canada and Australia, respectively). The Stellas released their self-titled debut in 2011 via EMI Music Canada, and O'Shea released their debut, Mr. and Mrs. via Sony Australia in 2011. Additionally, JB Rocket was later signed to Valory Music Group, a sister label of Big Machine Records. However, JB Rocket was eventually released from the label without releasing anything.

Brandon Green was previously on American Idol as one of the top 50 contestants in its seventh season, and Kassie Miller was previously on CMT's Ultimate Coyote Ugly Search where she won the first season.
