= Keep On Lovin' You =

Single by Steel Magnolia

from the album Steel Magnolia
- Released: September 14, 2009
- Genre: Country
- Length: 3:04
- Label: Big Machine
- Songwriters: Chris Stapleton; Trent Willmon
- Producer: Dann Huff

Steel Magnolia singles chronology
"Keep On Lovin' You" (2009)	"Just By Being You (Halo and Wings)" (2010)

"Keep On Lovin' You" is a debut song recorded by American country music duo Steel Magnolia, which was written by Chris Stapleton and Trent Willmon. It was released in September 2009 as the first single from the album Steel Magnolia. The digital iTunes single was released a month earlier on August 9, 2009. It is included on the duo's self-titled EP, released in February 2010. The song was performed by the duo on the season finale of the CMT series Can You Duet, which they also won.

== Content ==
"Keep On Lovin' You" is an up-tempo in which both members of Steel Magnolia alternate lead vocals. The lyrics centralize on a theme of devotion to each other.

== Critical reception ==
Allen Jacobs of Roughstock said "both Meghan Linsey and Joshua Scott Jones have voices with an "edge" to them and Meghan, in particular, has a voice that recalls one of her idols, Bekka Bramlett. Joshua Scott's voice recalls rock vocalists of the past but when you blend their two voices together there's just something about this couple, and they are a couple, that makes them work. Chris Neal of Country Weekly called it a "simple little number" that "gives real-life couple Joshua Scott Jones and Meghan Linsey a chance to shine," giving it three-and-a-half stars out of five.

The song is included on the Valentine's Day movie soundtrack, also released on Big Machine.

== Music video ==
The music video was directed by Trey Fanjoy, and was released on September 4, 2009.

== Chart performance ==
"Keep On Lovin' You" debuted at number 58 on the U.S. Billboard Hot Country Songs chart for the week of August 29, 2009, several weeks before its official September 14, 2009 release date. It became the duo's only Top Ten hit in June 2010.

Chart (2009–2010)	Peak position
US Billboard Hot 100	68
US Hot Country Songs (Billboard)	4

=== Year-end charts ===
Chart (2010)	Position
US Country Songs (Billboard)	15
