= Paperdoll (band) =

American indie rock band

PaperDoll
- Origin: New York City, United States
- Genres: Indie rock, alternative rock
- Years active: 2006–present
- Members: Teresa Lee; Patrick Moloney; Jack Koch; Will Haywood Smith
- Website: www.paperdollband.com

PaperDoll is an American indie rock band from New York City, consisting of Teresa Lee (vocals), Patrick Moloney (guitar), Jack Koch (bass guitar), and Will Haywood Smith (drums).

== History ==
The band gained international attention when they played at the Shanghai World Expo August 2010 on their first tour of China.

On their second tour, in October 2010, they once again attracted TV headlines with record-breaking crowds during the closing of the Shanghai World Expo. They also made history as the final guests on EXPO 360, a show highlighting the best of the World Expo. Making headlines in the fashion world, lead singer Teresa Lee wore a dress by Flora Zeta. Chinese press, including People's Daily, praised the US band for their action-packed live performances.

With a growing fanbase in China, in October 2011, PaperDoll returned for a third tour, aptly titled NY2CN: Can't Stop It!!! after their single "You Can't Stop It". In partnership with Loft Records in Tianjin, PaperDoll released an English/Chinese CD with 14 songs including a remake of the Chinese traditional song "Moon Represents My Heart" in China. The tour included stops at the World Leisure Expo in Hangzhou. This led to TuneCore featuring them in an article about how to break into the Chinese music scene. There were also featured in Asiance Magazine, Yellow, HelloNanjing and on the cover of Asian Fusion.

They appeared in a Nike campaign shown in Greater China, and in the film The People I've Slept With. The band gained attention in the US in early 2010 when their song "If Nothing Happened" was used in a national TV commercial for Vick's DayQuil. The same song on the commercial "If Nothing Happened" was also named in Blender's "Five Songs We Love" in March 2010. The song "If Nothing Happened" was used on the Today Show in the clip "Hey Al, Have you Ever Overslept", where the famous weatherman was exercising before work.

Their single "Silent" is used in Quentin Lee's film White Frog starring BD Wong, Harry Shum Jr, Booboo Stewart, Joan Chen, and Kelly Hu. PaperDoll are known for several of their videos, seen regularly on iaTV and MTV Iggy, as well as for performing the theme song for the TV show Comedy Zen.

== Members ==
- Teresa Lee – vocals/keyboards. Was named a Maxim Girl Next Door in 2009
- Jack Koch – bass guitar
- Will Haywood Smith – drums
- Patrick Moloney – guitar. (his brother Michael Moloney was lead singer/guitarist of the Irish art rock band Director. U2 once opened for their father's (Pat Moloney) band, Spitfire, in the early 1980s.

=== Former members ===
- Steve Paelet
- Chip Thomas

== Discography ==
=== Albums ===
- 2010 – Ballad Nerd Pop
- 2012 – Sashimi Deluxe
