= Steel Magnolia =

American country music band (2009–2014)

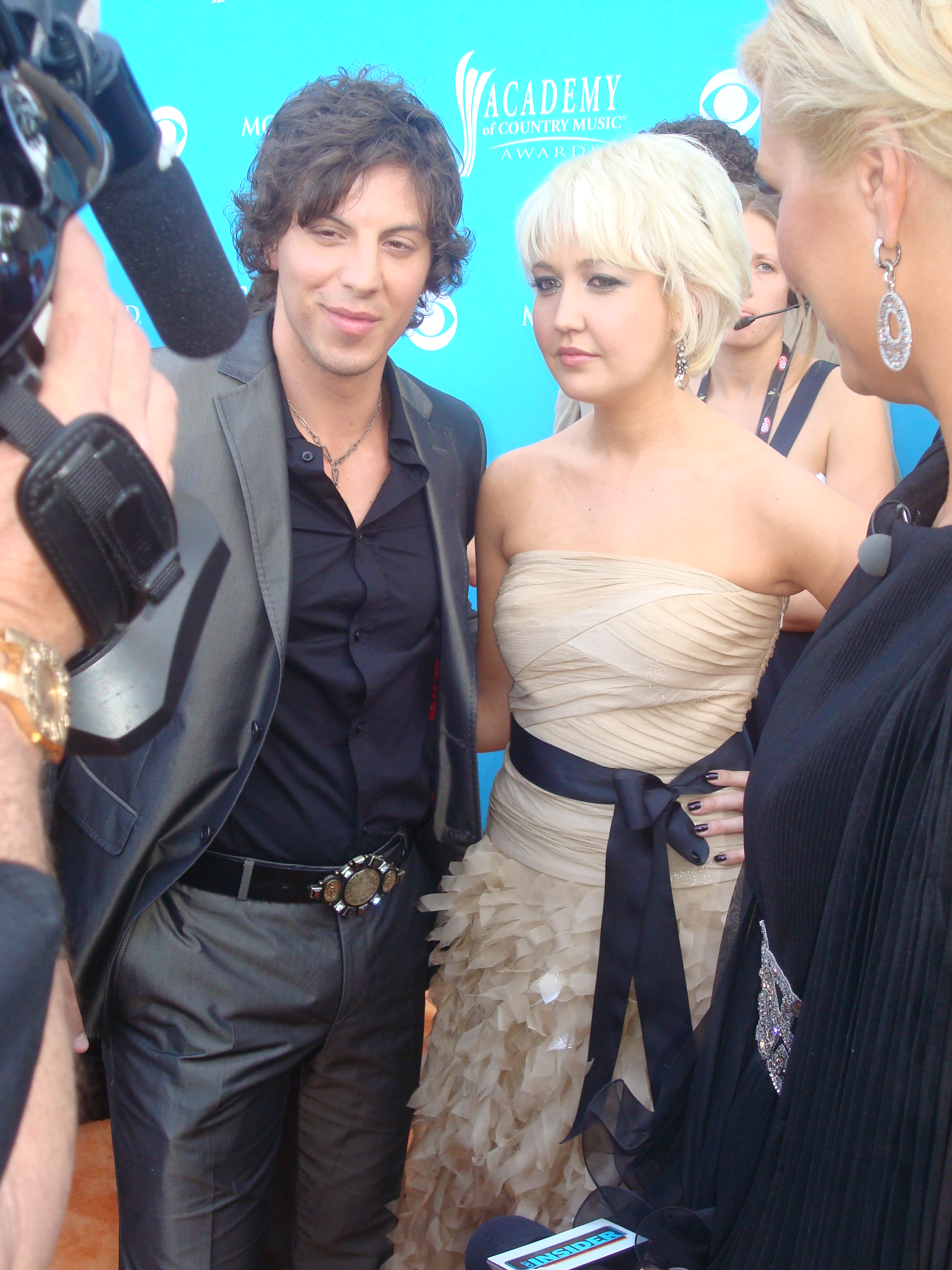
- Steel Magnolia at the 2010 ACM Awards

Background information
- Origin: Nashville, Tennessee, U.S.
- Genre: Country
- Years active: 2009–2014
- Label: Big Machine
- Past members: Meghan Linsey; Joshua Scott Jones
- Website: www.steelmagnoliamusic.com (as of March 25, 2014)

Steel Magnolia was an American country music duo that won season two of the television talent show Can You Duet. The duo consisted of Meghan Linsey and her fiancé, Joshua Scott Jones. After becoming the top winner on the show, the duo signed a recording contract with Big Machine Records, and released its debut single "Keep On Lovin' You" in August 2009, which was a Top 10 hit on the U.S. Billboard Hot Country Songs chart.

== Biography ==
A native of Ponchatoula, La., 23-year-old Meghan Linsey formed Steel Magnolia with her boyfriend of three years, Joshua Scott Jones. Before trying out for Can You Duet, Linsey was a karaoke host at a Nashville karaoke bar, called Lonnie's Western Room, which is where she met Jones.

On September 29, 2011, Jones made a public announcement that he had entered drug rehabilitation. In Jones's absence, fellow country artist and former touring partner James Otto stepped in so that Steel Magnolia could continue their touring obligations while maintaining a duet. Otto cited similar musical tastes for sparking his interest in joining Linsey.

On March 3, 2014, Linsey and Jones, together on their Facebook page, made a public announcement that they were each going to pursue solo careers.

== Music career ==
=== Steel Magnolia—EP: (2009–2010) ===
Steel Magnolia released their debut single "Keep On Lovin' You" shortly after winning season two of Can You Duet. It debuted at No. 58 on the Billboard country charts and became a Top 5 hit on that chart. In November 2009, the song became the highest-charting single from a Can You Duet competitor; season one finalists' Joey + Rory's debut single, "Cheater, Cheater," peaked at No. 30 on the U.S. Billboard Hot Country Songs chart in January 2009. The song served as the lead-off single to the duo's self-titled extended play, which was released on February 23, 2010. It has also been included in the soundtrack to the film Valentine's Day.

In October 2009, they made their Grand Ole Opry debut and sang "Keep on Lovin' You" as well as "I'm So Lonesome I Could Cry", by Hank Williams.

The duo earned its first Academy of Country Music Awards nomination for the 2010 Top New Vocal Duo alongside Bomshel and Joey + Rory.

=== Debut album: (2010–2014) ===
Steel Magnolia's self-titled debut album was scheduled to be released on September 21, 2010, but was pushed back and eventually released on January 11, 2011. Steel Magnolia debuted within the Top 10 of the Billboard 200 and Billboard Top Country Albums, debuting at number 7 and number 3, respectively. It sold approximately 28,000 copies in the United States during the first week of sales.

The album includes their debut single, as well as their second single, "Just By Being You (Halo and Wings)," which was released to country radio in July 2010, and became their second Top 30 single on the country charts. "Last Night Again," which was released to country radio on December 6, 2010, as the album's third single, peaked at number 24 on the country chart. A fourth single, "Bulletproof," was released on August 22, 2011.

Jones entered rehabilitation in September 2011, with James Otto filling in for him on a tour with Reba McEntire. In January 2012, Steel Magnolia parted ways with Big Machine amid rumors that the duo had parted. In June 2012, the duo announced they are working on a new album. They also performed at LP Field as part of the CMA Music Fest.

=== Split and solo careers: (2014–2015) ===
In 2014, the duo split. Jones released a solo single titled "Honk If You're Tonky", and Linsey released a cover of OneRepublic's "Counting Stars". Jones told The Boot that "I’m not saying we’ll never make another record because you never know". Linsey confirmed that the split was official.

In 2015, Linsey tried out for season 8 of The Voice, having three judges (with the exception of Blake Shelton) turn their chairs around. She chose Pharrell Williams as her coach, and was stolen by Shelton after losing in the Battle Rounds. She continued with Shelton as her coach throughout the season. She finished as the runner-up of the season.

== Discography ==
=== Studio albums ===
Title	Details	Peak chart positions	
Title	Details	US Country	US
Steel Magnolia	Release date: January 11, 2011; Label: Big Machine Records; Formats: CD, music download	3	7

=== Extended plays ===
Title	Details	Peak chart positions	
Title	Details	US Country	US Heat
Steel Magnolia — EP	Release date: February 23, 2010; Label: Big Machine Records; Formats: CD, music download	47	33

=== Singles ===
Year	Single	Peak chart positions		Album
Year	Single	US Country	US	Album
2009	"Keep On Lovin' You"	4	68	Steel Magnolia
2010	"Just By Being You (Halo and Wings)"	25	—	Steel Magnolia
2010	"Last Night Again"	24	— (Note: "Last Night Again" did not enter the Hot 100, but peaked at number 22 on Bubbling Under Hot 100 Singles, which acts as a 25-song extension of the Hot 100.)	Steel Magnolia
2011	"Bulletproof"	47	—	Steel Magnolia
"—" denotes releases that did not chart

=== Music videos ===
Year	Video	Director
2009	"Keep On Lovin' You"	Trey Fanjoy
2010	"Just By Being You (Halo and Wings)"	Kristin Barlowe
2010	"Last Night Again"	Peter Zavadil
2011	"Bulletproof"	Aaron Thomas

=== Other appearances ===
Year	Song	Album
2010	"Keep On Lovin' You"	Valentine's Day soundtrack
2010	"It's Christmas Time"	Non-album song
2011	"Maybe I'm Amazed"	Let Us In Nashville/A Tribute to Linda McCartney

== Awards and nominations ==
Year	Association	Category	Result
2010	Academy of Country Music Awards	Top New Vocal Duo	Nominated
2010	Academy of Country Music Awards	Top Vocal Duo of the Year	Nominated
2010	CMT Music Awards	Duo Video of the Year - "Keep On Lovin' You"	Nominated
2010	CMT Music Awards	USA Weekend Breakthrough Video of the Year - "Keep On Lovin' You"	Nominated
2010	Country Music Association Awards	Vocal Duo of the Year	Nominated
2010	American Country Awards	Single by a Duo/Group - "Keep On Lovin' You"	Nominated
2010	American Country Awards	Single by New/Breakthrough Artist - "Keep On Lovin' You"	Nominated
2010	American Country Awards	Video by Duo/Group - "Keep On Lovin' You"	Nominated
2010	American Country Awards	Video by New/Breakthrough Artist - "Keep On Lovin' You"	Nominated
2011	Academy of Country Music Awards	Top New Vocal Duo or Group	Nominated
2011	Academy of Country Music Awards	Top Vocal Duo of the Year	Nominated
2011	CMT Music Awards	Duo Video of the Year - "Last Night Again"	Nominated
2011	Teen Choice Awards	Choice Music: Country Group	Nominated
2011	Country Music Association Awards	Vocal Duo of the Year	Nominated
