= Meghan Linsey =

American singer-songwriter (born 1985)

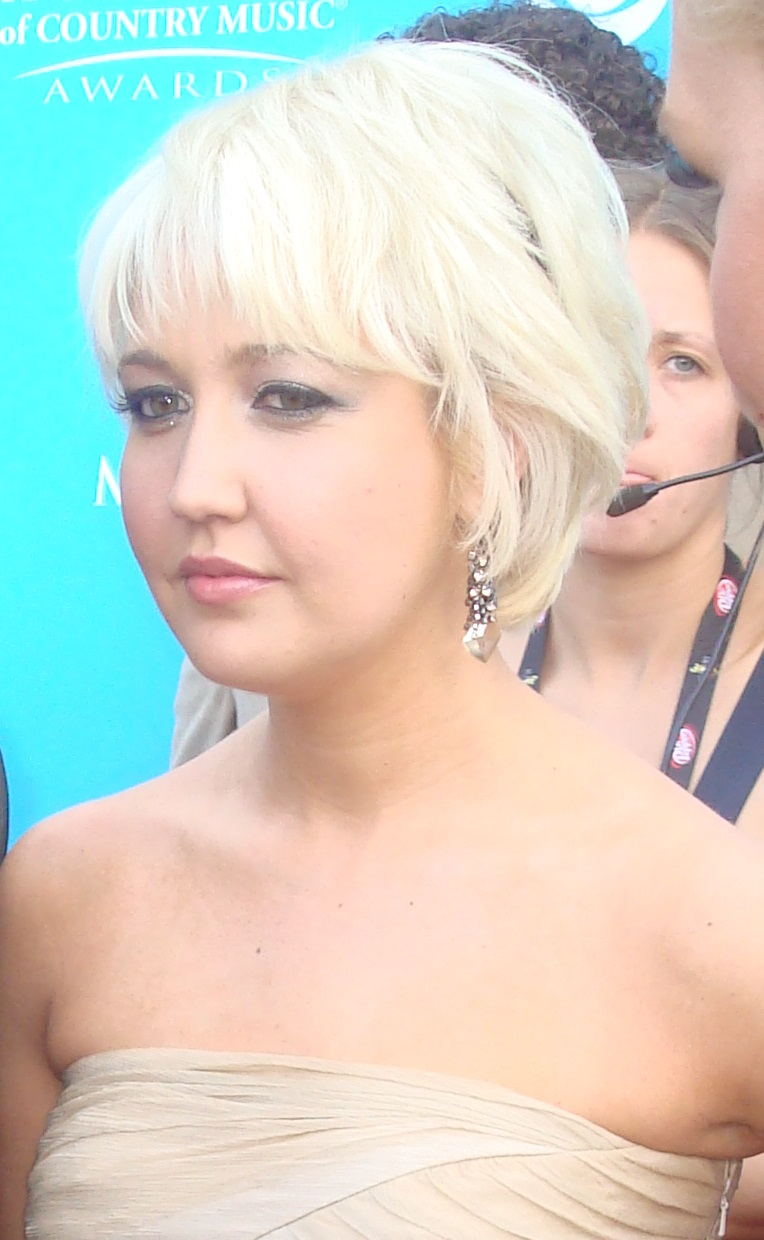
- Linsey in 2010

Background information
- Genres: Country, pop
- Occupation: Singer-songwriter
- Years active: 2002–present
- Formerly of: Steel Magnolia
- Website: http://www.meghanlinsey.com (as of October 6, 2022)

Meghan Linsey is an American singer-songwriter. A Ponchatoula, Louisiana native, she rose to fame as one half of the country music duo Steel Magnolia with her boyfriend of three years, Joshua Scott Jones. Before trying out for Can You Duet, Linsey was a karaoke host at a Nashville karaoke bar, called Lonnie's Western Room, which is where she met Jones. After becoming the top winner on the show, the duo signed a recording contract with Big Machine Records, and released its debut single "Keep On Lovin' You" in August 2009, which was a Top 10 hit on the U.S. Billboard Hot Country Songs chart.

== Music career ==
Linsey started her solo career by releasing a cover of OneRepublic's "Counting Stars". In 2015, Linsey was selected to audition for season 8 of The Voice, having three judges (with the exception of Blake Shelton) turn their chairs around. She chose Pharrell Williams as her coach, and was stolen by Shelton after losing in the battle rounds. She continued with Shelton as her coach throughout the season. She finished the season coming in second place to Sawyer Fredericks from Team Pharrell. Shortly after she returned to Nashville, she released an EP titled Believer including six songs. Following the EP release, she developed a beauty brand titled "Believer by Meghan Linsey." To create this curated collection of cruelty-free products, she partnered with Previse and Modern Minerals.

In 2017, her first Pop studio album, named Bold Like a Lion, was released and contained 13 songs.

=== The Voice ===
Studio version of performance reached the top 10 on iTunes

Stage	Song	Original Artist	Date	Order	Result
Blind Audition	"Love Hurts"	The Everly Brothers; later famously covered by Nazareth	February 23, 2015	1/8	Adam Levine, Pharrell Williams and Christina Aguilera turned Joined Team Pharrell
Battle Rounds (Top 48)	"Don't Let Me Down" (vs. Paul Pfau)	The Beatles	March 10, 2015	7/9	Defeated; Stolen by Blake Shelton
Knockout Rounds (Top 32)	"(You Make Me Feel Like) A Natural Woman" (vs. Travis Ewing)	Aretha Franklin	March 23, 2015	10/5	Saved by Coach
Live Playoffs (Top 20)	"Love Runs Out"	OneRepublic	April 6, 2015	9	Saved by Public Vote
Live Top 12	"Girl Crush"	Little Big Town	April 13, 2015	11	Saved by Public Vote
Live Top 10	"Home"	Marc Broussard	April 20, 2015	4	Saved by Public Vote
Live Top 8	"Something"	The Beatles	April 27, 2015	4	Saved by Public Vote
Live Top 6	"Steamroller Blues"	James Taylor	May 4, 2015	5	Saved by Public Vote
Live Top 6	"Amazing Grace"	Christian song	May 4, 2015	12	Saved by Public Vote
Live Top 5 (Semi-finals)	"I'm Not the Only One"	Sam Smith	May 11, 2015	3	Saved by Public Vote
Live Top 5 (Semi-finals)	"Tennessee Whiskey"	David Allan Coe; later famously covered by George Jones, also later covered by Chris Stapleton	May 11, 2015	8	Saved by Public Vote
Live Finale	"When a Man Loves a Woman"	Percy Sledge	May 18, 2015	11	Runner-up
Live Finale	"Freeway of Love" (with Blake Shelton)	Aretha Franklin	May 18, 2015	8	Runner-up
Live Finale	"Change My Mind"	Meghan Linsey	May 18, 2015	2	Runner-up

== Discography ==
=== Albums ===
Title	Details
This Is Now	Release date: 2002; Label: Thumbprint; Formats: CD

=== Extended plays ===
Title	Details
Meghan Linsey	Release date: September 9, 2014; Label: Bold Music Group, LLC.; Formats: CD, music download
Believer	Release date: July 31, 2015; Label: Bold Music Group, LLC.; Formats: CD, music download

=== Singles ===
Year	Title	Peak positions	Album
Year	Title	US	Album
2013	"Counting Stars"	—	Meghan Linsey
2014	"Gasoline and Matches" (with James Otto)	—	Crazy Hearts: Nashville (soundtrack)
2014	"Try Harder Than That" (feat. Bubba Sparxxx)	—	Meghan Linsey
2014	"O Holy Night"	—	—N/a
2015	"Love Never Sleeps"	—	Meghan Linsey
2015	"Change My Mind"	92	The Voice: The Complete Season 8 Collection
2015	"Perfect Time of Year"	—	—N/a
"—" denotes releases that did not chart

=== Music videos ===
Year	Video	Director
2013	"Counting Stars"	Josh Marx
2014	"Try Harder Than That" (feat. Bubba Sparxxx)	Ryan Hamblin

=== Releases from The Voice ===
==== Albums ====
Title	Details	Peak positions
Title	Details	US
The Voice: The Complete Season 8 Collection	Release date: May 19, 2015; Label: Republic Records; Formats: music download	45

==== Singles ====
Year	Title	Peak chart positions				Album
Year	Title	US	US Christ	US Country	US Rock	Album
2015	"Girl Crush"	101	—	22	—	The Voice: The Complete; Season 8 Collection
2015	"Home"	—	—	—	27	The Voice: The Complete; Season 8 Collection
2015	"Something"	—	—	—	30	The Voice: The Complete; Season 8 Collection
2015	"Amazing Grace"	109	1	—	—	The Voice: The Complete; Season 8 Collection
2015	"Steamroller Blues"	—	—	—	37	The Voice: The Complete; Season 8 Collection
2015	"I'm Not the Only One"	—	—	—	—	The Voice: The Complete; Season 8 Collection
2015	"Tennessee Whiskey"	118	—	28	—	The Voice: The Complete; Season 8 Collection
2015	"When a Man Loves a Woman"	—	—	—	—	The Voice: The Complete; Season 8 Collection
2015	"Freeway of Love" (with Blake Shelton)	—	—	—	—	The Voice: The Complete; Season 8 Collection
"—" denotes releases that did not chart
