= Jamie O'Neal discography =

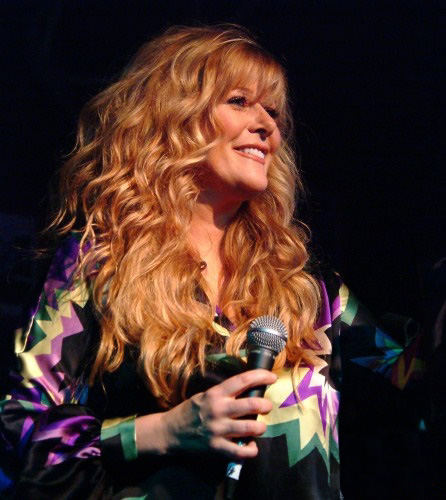
- Jamie O'Neal in 2006
- Studio albums: 7
- Singles: 26
- Music videos: 11
- Other album appearances: 2

The discography of American country artist Jamie O'Neal contains seven studio albums, 26 singles, 11 music videos and two album appearances. Her debut album Shiver was released in October 2000 by Mercury Records Nashville. It reached number 14 on the US Top Country Albums chart and certified gold in sales from the Recording Industry Association of America. The album spawned a total of four singles. Its first two releases, "There Is No Arizona" and "When I Think About Angels", topped the US Hot Country Songs chart. Both singles also made the top 40 of the US Hot 100. Capitol Records Nashville only released an advanced promotional copy of her next studio album Every Little Thing in 2003. Its title track was released as a single the same year and made the US country songs top 40.

In March 2005, Capitol officially released O'Neal's third studio album titled Brave. It reached number six on the US Top Country Albums chart and number 40 on the US Billboard 200. Its lead single "Trying to Find Atlantis" reached number 18 on the US country songs chart. It was followed by "Somebody's Hero" in 2005 which made the US and Canadian country top five. In 2007, O'Neal's next single "God Don't Make No Mistakes" made the US country top 50. The 2008 single "Like a Woman" reached a similar chart position. O'Neal's fourth studio album Eternal was released in May 2014 and spawned the single "Wide Awake". In October 2020, O'Neal's fifth studio album Sometimes was released. It featured the singles "The World Goes On" and "Wreck Me". In November 2023, her sixth studio album Spirit & Joy was released. In January 2026, her seventh studio album Gypsum was released.

== Studio albums ==
List of albums, with selected chart positions, certifications, and other relevant details
Title	Album details	Peak chart positions		Certifications
Title	Album details	US	US Cou.	Certifications
Shiver	Released: October 31, 2000; Label: Mercury Nashville; Formats: CD, cassette	125	14	RIAA: Gold
Every Little Thing (Note: Every Little Thing was only released in advanced copies to radio stations, but never officially released.)	Released: 2003; Label: Mercury Nashville; Formats: CD	—	—	
Brave	Released: March 1, 2005; Label: Capitol Nashville; Formats: CD	40	6	
Eternal	Released: May 27, 2014; Label: Shanachie; Formats: CD, digital	—	—	
Sometimes	Released: October 16, 2020; Label: Audium/JOG Inc.; Formats: CD, digital	—	—	
Spirit & Joy	Released: November 3, 2023; Label: Audium/JOG Inc.; Formats: CD, Digital	—	—	
Gypsum	Released: January 23, 2026; Label: Audium/JOG Inc.; Formats: CD, Digital	—	—	
"—" denotes a recording that did not chart or was not released in that territory.

== Singles ==
=== As lead artist ===
List of singles, with selected chart positions, showing other relevant details
Title	Year	Peak chart positions			Album
Title	Year	US	US Cou.	CAN Cou. (Note: Chart positions from RPM Country Tracks from fall 2000, and Radio & Records from 2004 to 2005)	Album
"There Is No Arizona"	2000	40	1	52	Shiver
"When I Think About Angels"	2001	35	1	—	Shiver
"Shiver"	2001	—	21	—	Shiver
"Frantic"	2002	—	41	—	Shiver
"Every Little Thing"	2003	—	34	—	On My Way To You
"Trying to Find Atlantis"	2004	86	18	—	Brave
"Somebody's Hero"	2005	51	3	3	Brave
"I Love My Life"	2005	—	26	—	Brave
"God Don't Make Mistakes"	2007	—	47	—	—N/a
"Like a Woman"	2008	—	43	—	—N/a
"Soldier Comin' Home"	2009	—	—	—	—N/a
"Have Yourself a Merry Little Christmas" (with Rachele Lynae)	2012	—	—	—	—N/a
"Wide Awake"	2014	—	—	—	Eternal
"The World Goes On"	2020	—	—	—	Sometimes
"Wreck Me"	2020	—	—	—	Sometimes
"Wreck Me" (stripped)	2020	—	—	—	—N/a
"River"	2020	—	—	—	Spirit & Joy
"White Christmas"	2021	—	—	—	Spirit & Joy
"Christmas You"	2021	—	—	—	Spirit & Joy
"Merry Christmas Baby" (with Ty Herndon)	2023	—	—	—	Spirit & Joy
"Ole Heartache"	2025	—	—	—	Gypsum
"—" denotes a recording that did not chart or was not released in that territory.

=== As a featured artist ===
List of singles, with selected chart positions, showing other relevant details
Title	Year	Peak chart positions	Album
Title	Year	US Country.	Album
"I'm Not Gonna Do Anything Without You" (Mark Wills with Jamie O'Neal)	2001	31	Loving Every Minute
"Into the Circle" (Kaylee Rutland featuring Jamie O'Neal and Colt Ford)	2013	—	—N/a
"Story of My Life" (3 Story House featuring Jamie O'Neal, Ty Herndon and Andy Griggs)	2015	—	—N/a
"Like I Do" (Erica Nicole featuring Jamie O'Neal)	2016	—	—N/a
"If This Were a Love Song" (Matt VanFossen featuring Jamie O'Neal)	2022	—	This Is How You Lost Me
"—" denotes a recording that did not chart or was not released in that territory.

== Other album appearances ==
List of non-single guest appearances, with other performing artists, showing year released and album name
Title	Year	Other artist(s)	Album	Ref.
"All by Myself"	2001	—N/a	Bridget Jones's Diary: Music from the Motion Picture	
"Straight into Love"	2023	Kenny Rogers	Life Is Like a Song	

== Music videos ==
Year	Video	Director
2000	"There Is No Arizona"	Lawrence Carroll
2001	"When I Think About Angels"	Trey Fanjoy
2001	"America the Beautiful"	Marc Ball
2001	"Shiver"	Thom Oliphant
2002	"Frantic"	Keech Rainwater
2004	"Trying to Find Atlantis"	Randee St. Nicholas
2005	"Does He Love You" (with Carrie Underwood) (live from CMT's Greatest Duets)	Ryan Polito
2005	"Somebody's Hero"	Trey Fanjoy
2007	"God Don't Make Mistakes"	Kristin Barlowe
2009	"Like a Woman"	Trey Fanjoy
2014	"Wide Awake"	Jimmy Murphy
2022	"Christmas"	John Lee
