= Frantic (Jamie O'Neal song) =

Single by Jamie O'Neal

from the album Shiver
- B-side: "She Hasn't Heard It Yet"
- Released: March 11, 2002
- Genre: Country
- Length: 2:59
- Label: Mercury Nashville
- Songwriter(s): Jamie O'Neal; Lisa Drew; Shaye Smith
- Producer(s): Keith Stegall

Jamie O'Neal singles chronology
"I'm Not Gonna Do Anything Without You" (2001)	"Frantic" (2002)	"Every Little Thing" (2003)

"Frantic" is a song by Australian country music artist Jamie O'Neal. The song was written by O'Neal, Lisa Drew, and Shaye Smith, which was the same writing team as her number one single "There Is No Arizona"; it was also produced by Keith Stegall. It was released on March 11, 2002, via Mercury Nashville, as the fifth and final single from her debut studio album Shiver (2000).

It reached number 41, becoming her first single to chart outside the top-forty.

== Music video ==
Keech Rainwater directed the video for "Frantic". It debuted to CMT on March 24, 2002. It was the 11th most popular video on the channel for the week of April 7, 2002.

== Critical reception ==
The song was favorably reviewed. Kevin Oliver of Country Standard Time compared the song to the music of Dolly Parton during the 1970s, saying she "reveals a Dolly-esque warble." Rick Cohoon of AllMusic noted it, along with "Sanctuary", "There Is No Arizona", and "When I Think About Angels", were the only songs memorable, he said verbatim.

== Commercial performance ==
"Frantic" debuted on the US Billboard Hot Country Songs chart the week of March 16, 2002, at number 49, the second highest debut of the week. It reached a peak position of number 41 for the week of May 4, 2002, becoming O'Neal's first single to miss the top-forty of the chart.

== Charts ==
Chart (2002)	Peak position
US Hot Country Songs (Billboard)	41

== Track listing ==
7" single
No.	Title	Writer(s)	Producer(s)	Length
1.	"Frantic"	Jamie O'Neal; Lisa Drew; Shaye Smith	Keith Stegall	2:59
2.	"She Hasn't Heard It Yet"	O'Neal; Christi Dannemiller	Stegall	3:46

== Personnel ==
Taken from the Shiver booklet.

- Jamie O'Neal – vocals, background vocals, writing
- Lisa Drew – writing
- Shaye Smith – writing
- Brent Mason – electric guitar
- Owen Hale – drums
- Glenn Worf – bass
- Biff Watson – acoustic guitar
- Matt Rollings – piano
- Stuart Duncan – fiddle
- Eric Darken – percussion
- Aubrey Haynie – mandolin
- Kim Parent – background vocals
- Keith Stegall – production
