= Grammy Award for Best Country Song =

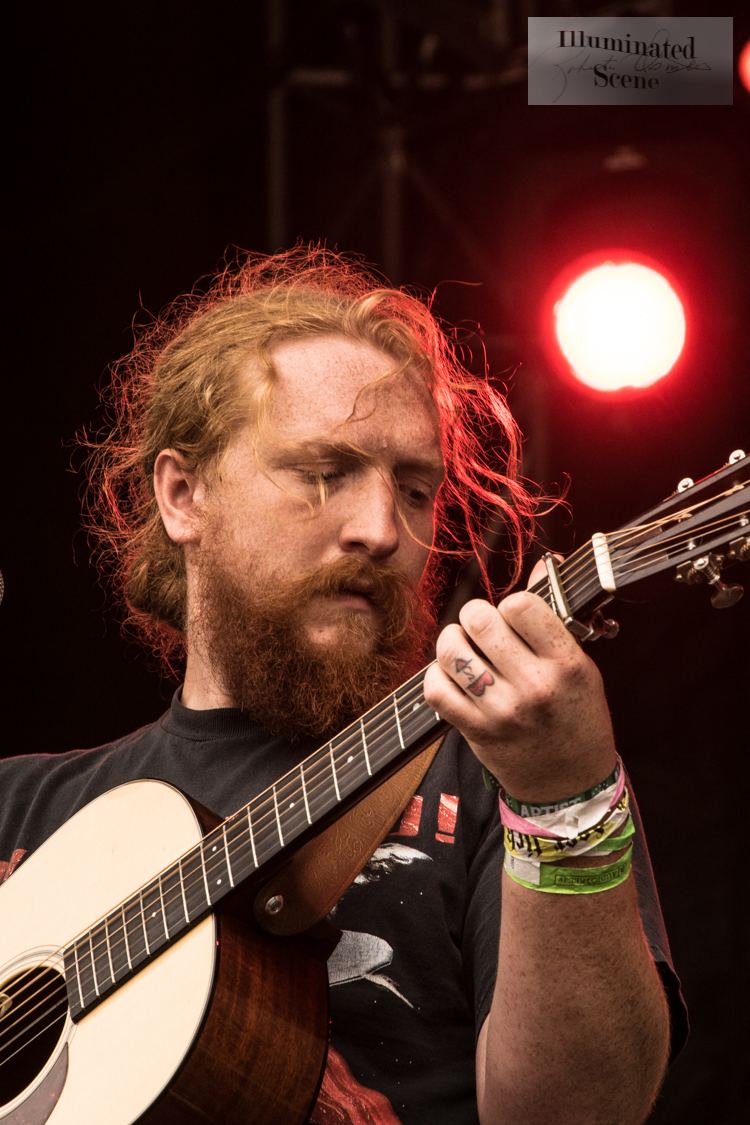
- "Bitin' List" by Tyler Childers is the most recent recipient
- Awarded for: Quality country songs
- Country: United States
- Presented by: National Academy of Recording Arts and Sciences
- First award: 1965
- Currently held by: Tyler Childers for "Bitin' List" (2026)
- Website: grammy.com

The Grammy Award for Best Country Song (sometimes known as the Country Songwriter's Award) has been awarded since 1965. The award is given to the songwriter(s) of the song, not to the artist, unless the artist is also the songwriter.

There have been several minor changes to the name of the award:

- From 1965 to 1968, it was known as "Best Country & Western Song"
- From 1969 to 1983, it was awarded as "Best Country Song"
- In 1984, it was awarded as "Best New Country Song "
- From 1985 to the present, it has again been awarded as "Best Country Song"

Years reflect the year in which the Grammy Awards were presented, for music released in the previous year. Lori McKenna, Josh Kear, Chris Stapleton, and Kacey Musgraves hold the record of most wins in the category with three wins each.

== Recipients ==
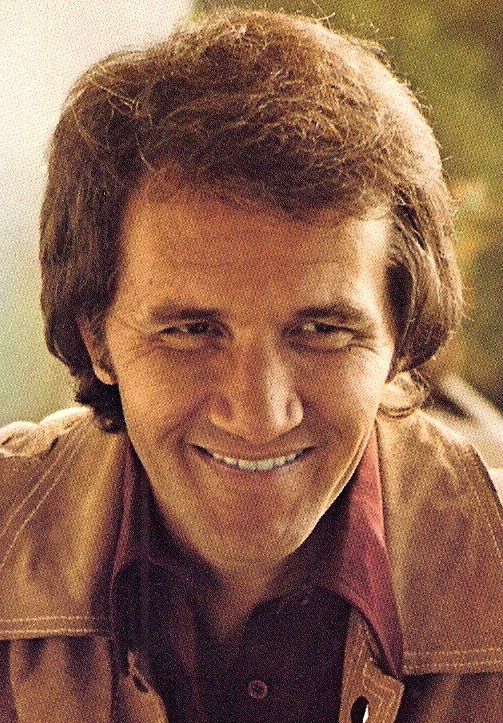
Two-time winner Roger Miller was the first recipient of the award.

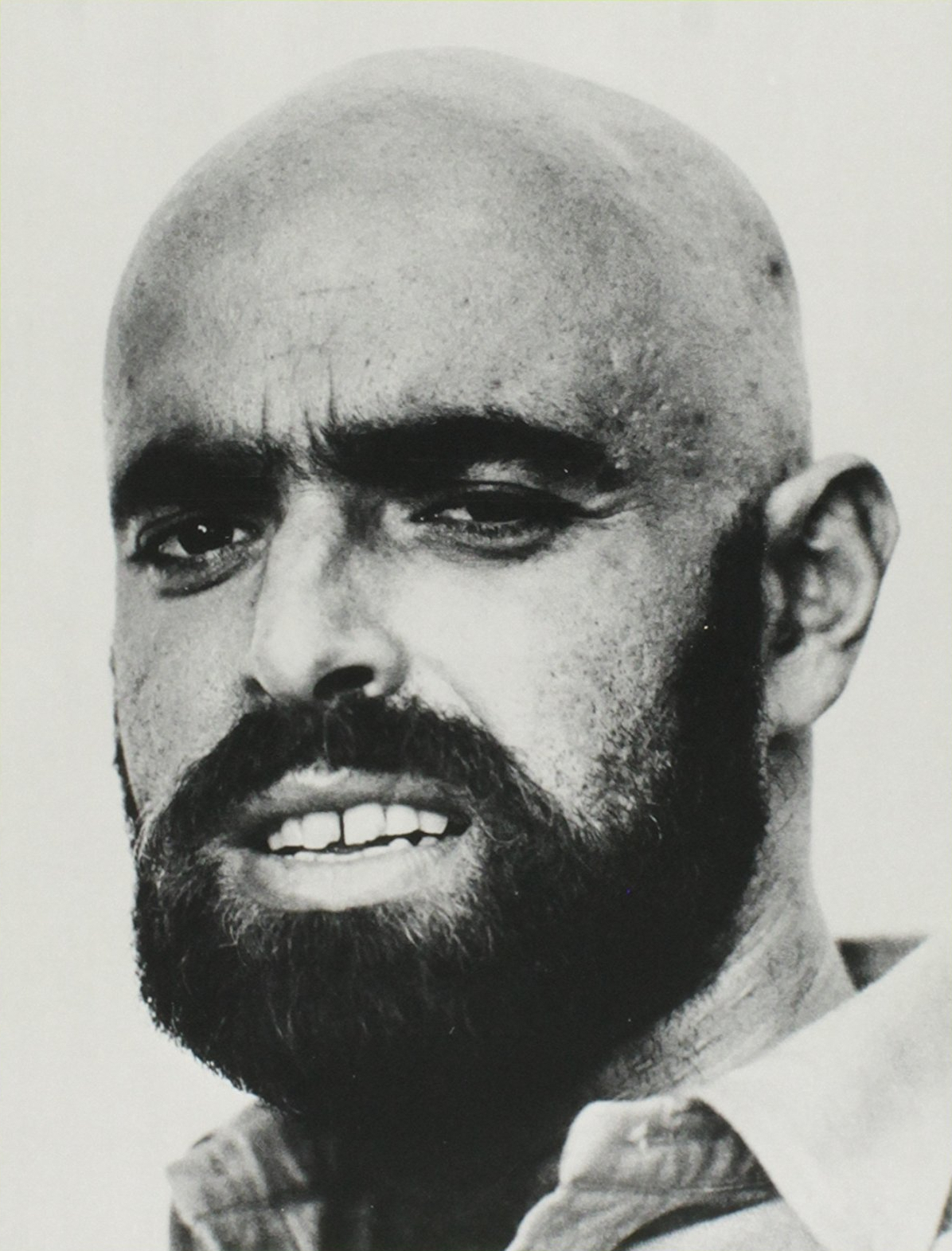
1970 winner Shel Silverstein

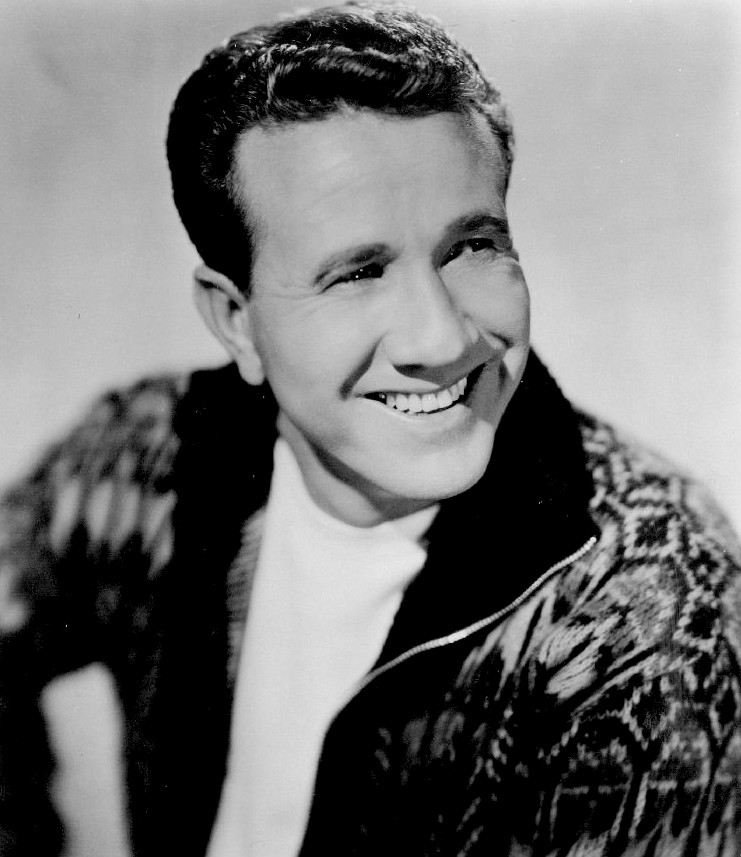
1971 winner Marty Robbins

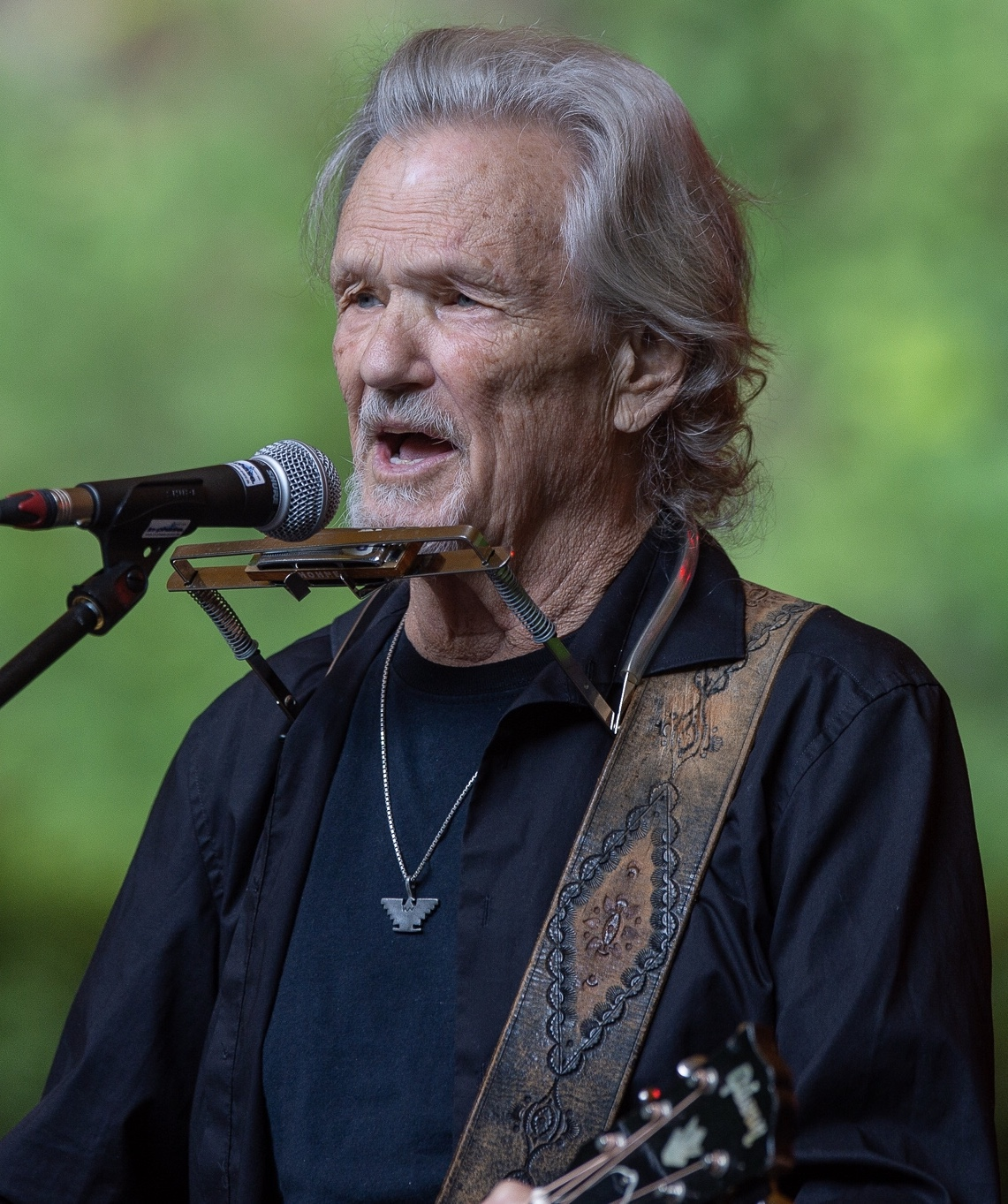
1972 winner Kris Kristofferson

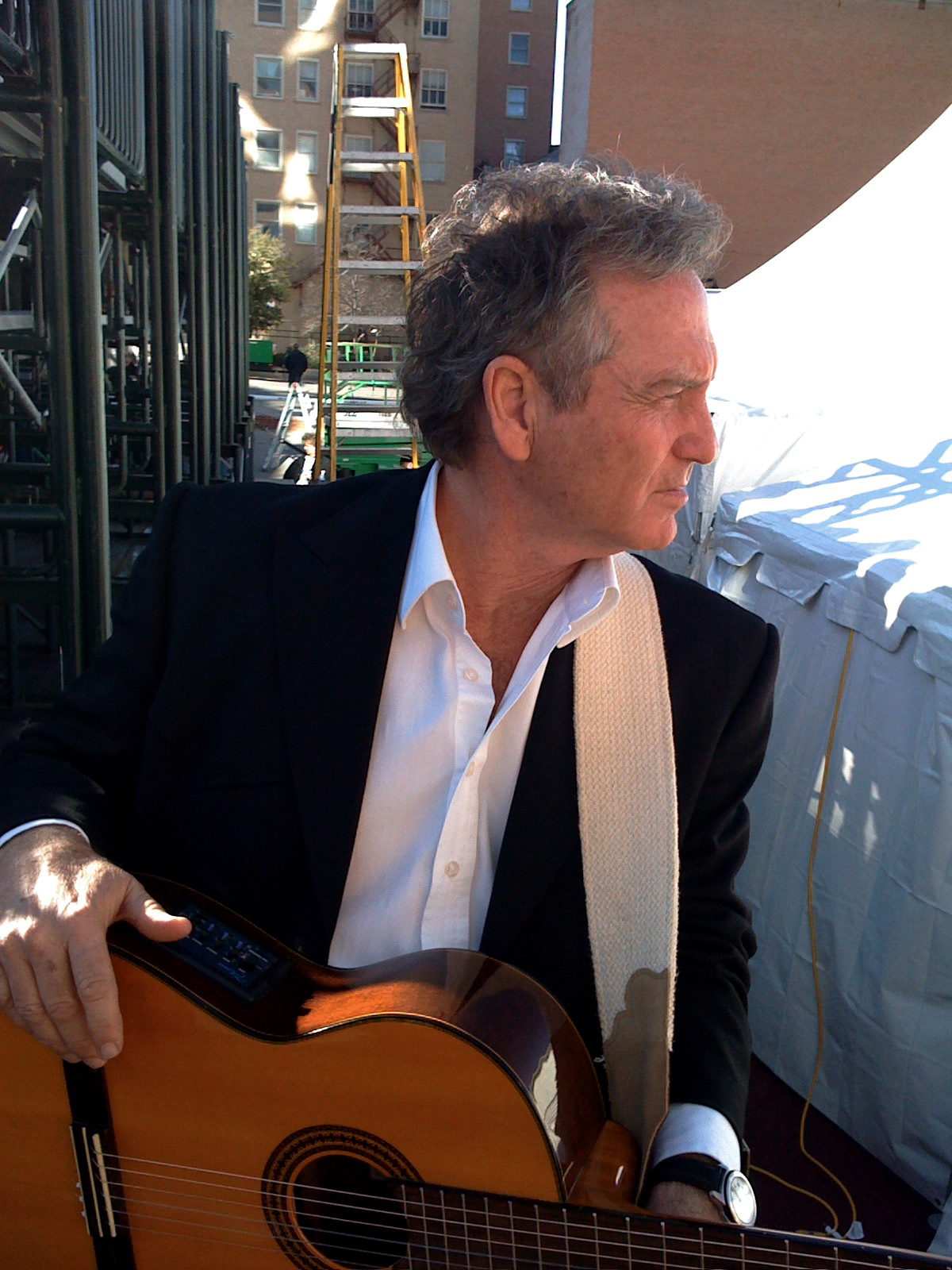
1977 winner Larry Gatlin

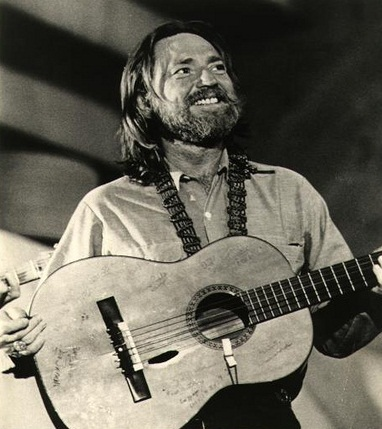
1981 winner Willie Nelson

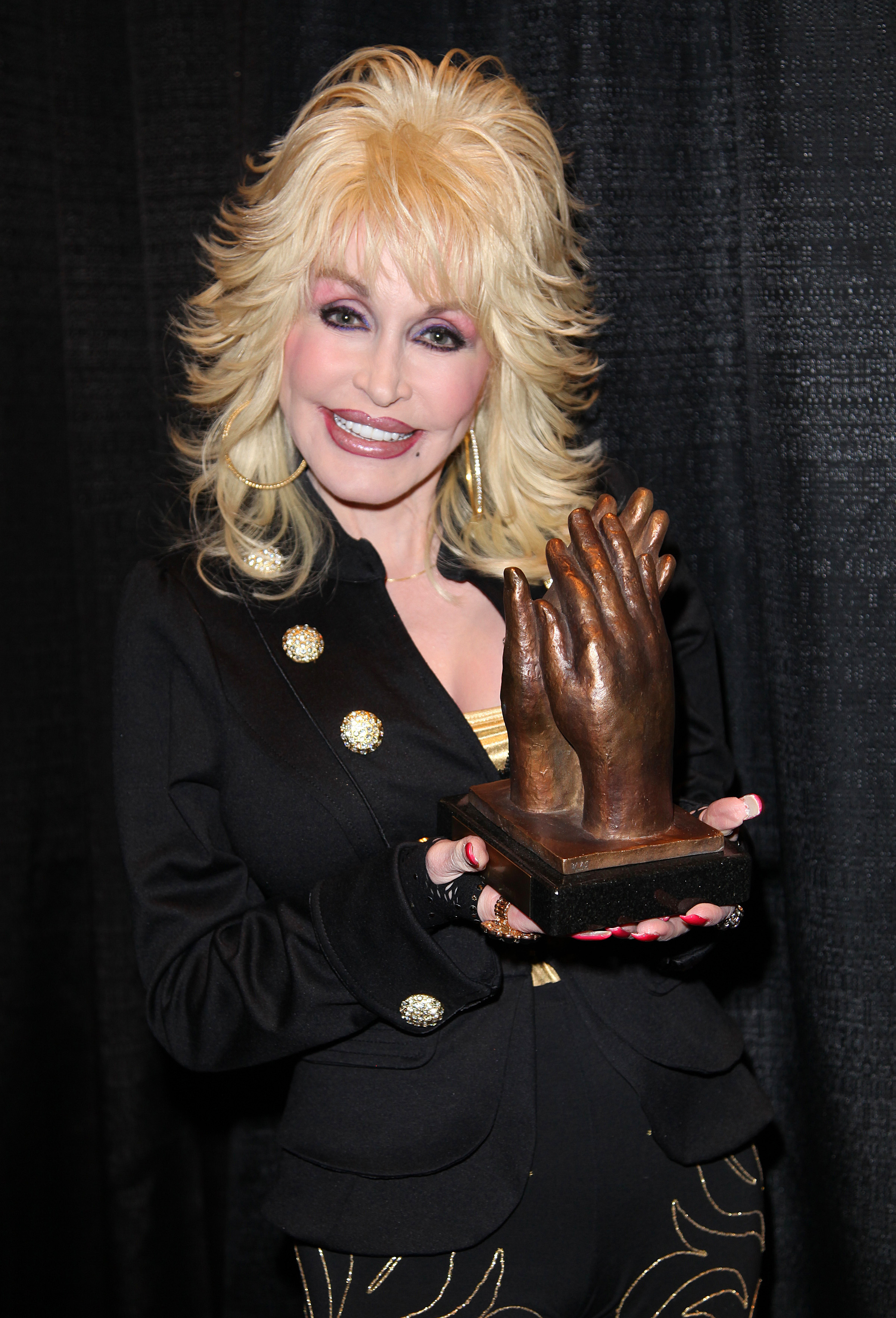
1982 winner Dolly Parton

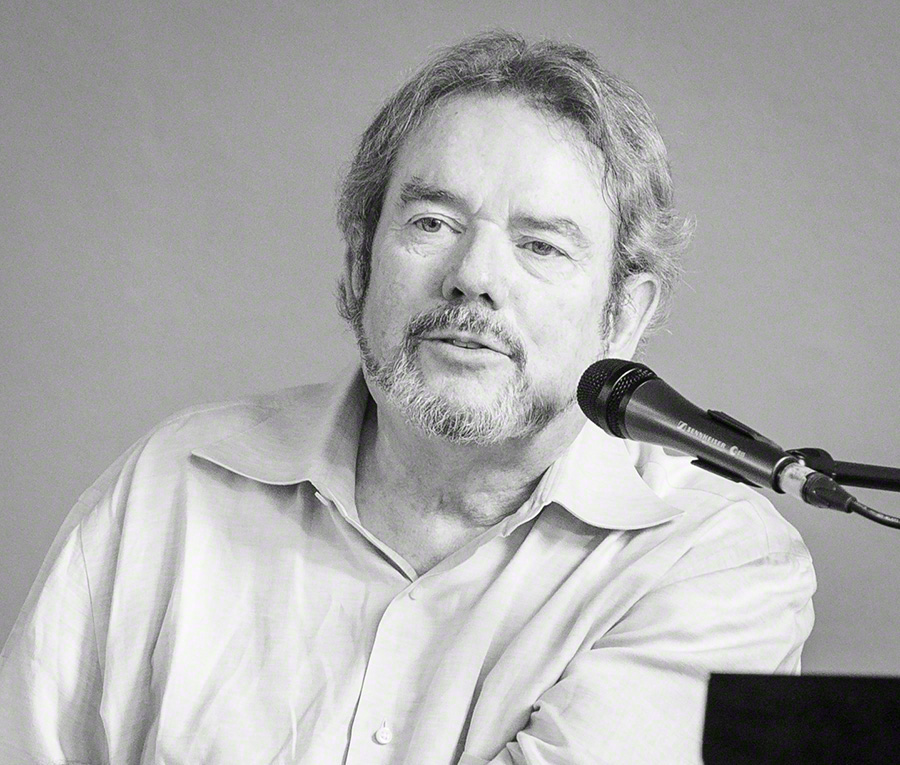
1986 winner Jimmy Webb

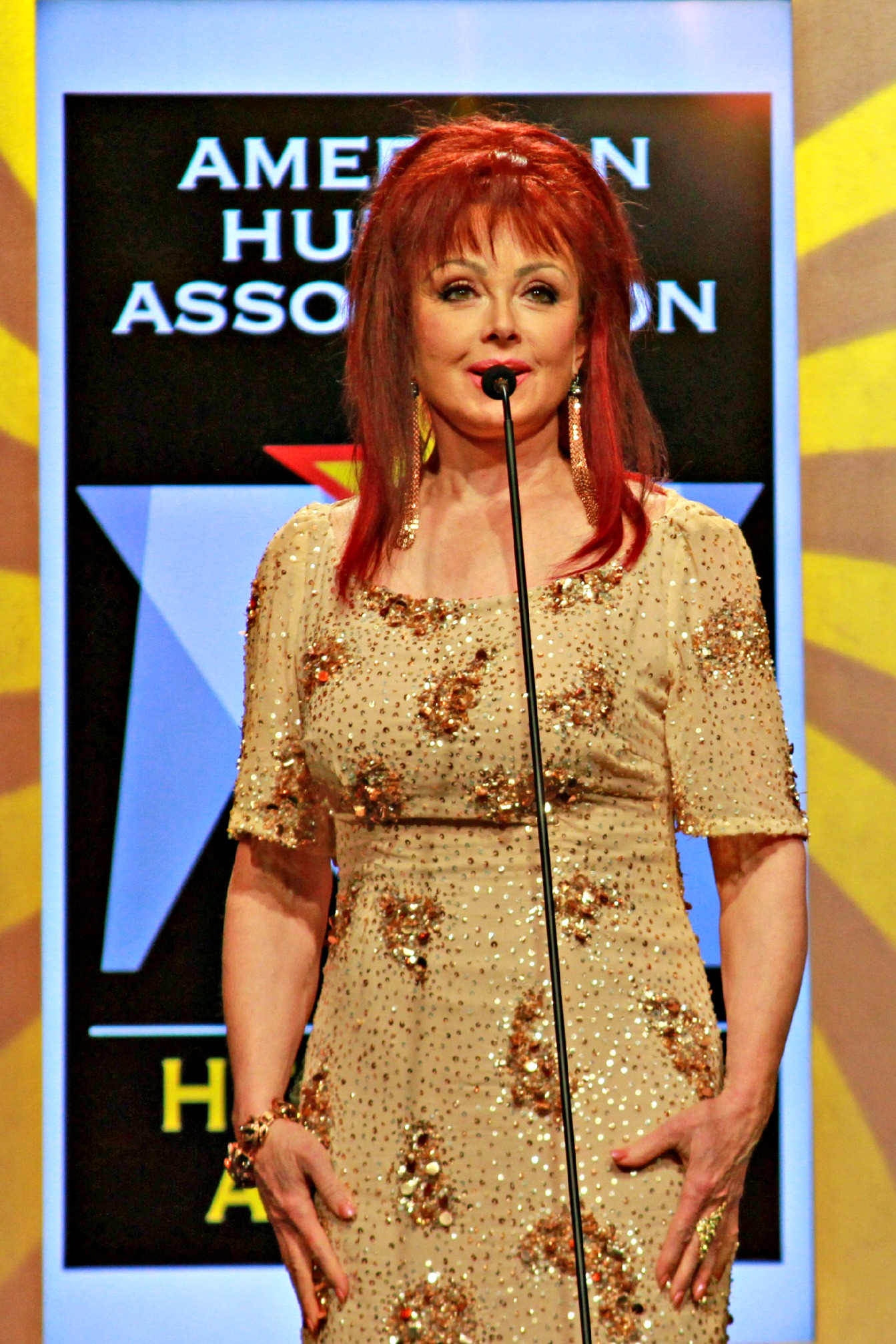
1992 co-winner Naomi Judd

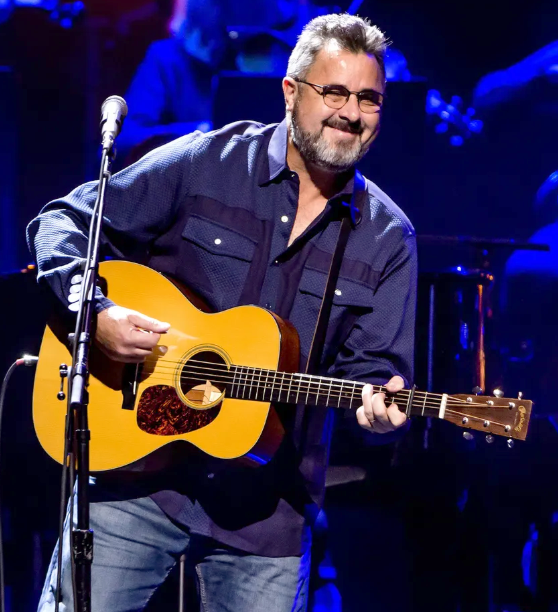
Two-time winner Vince Gill

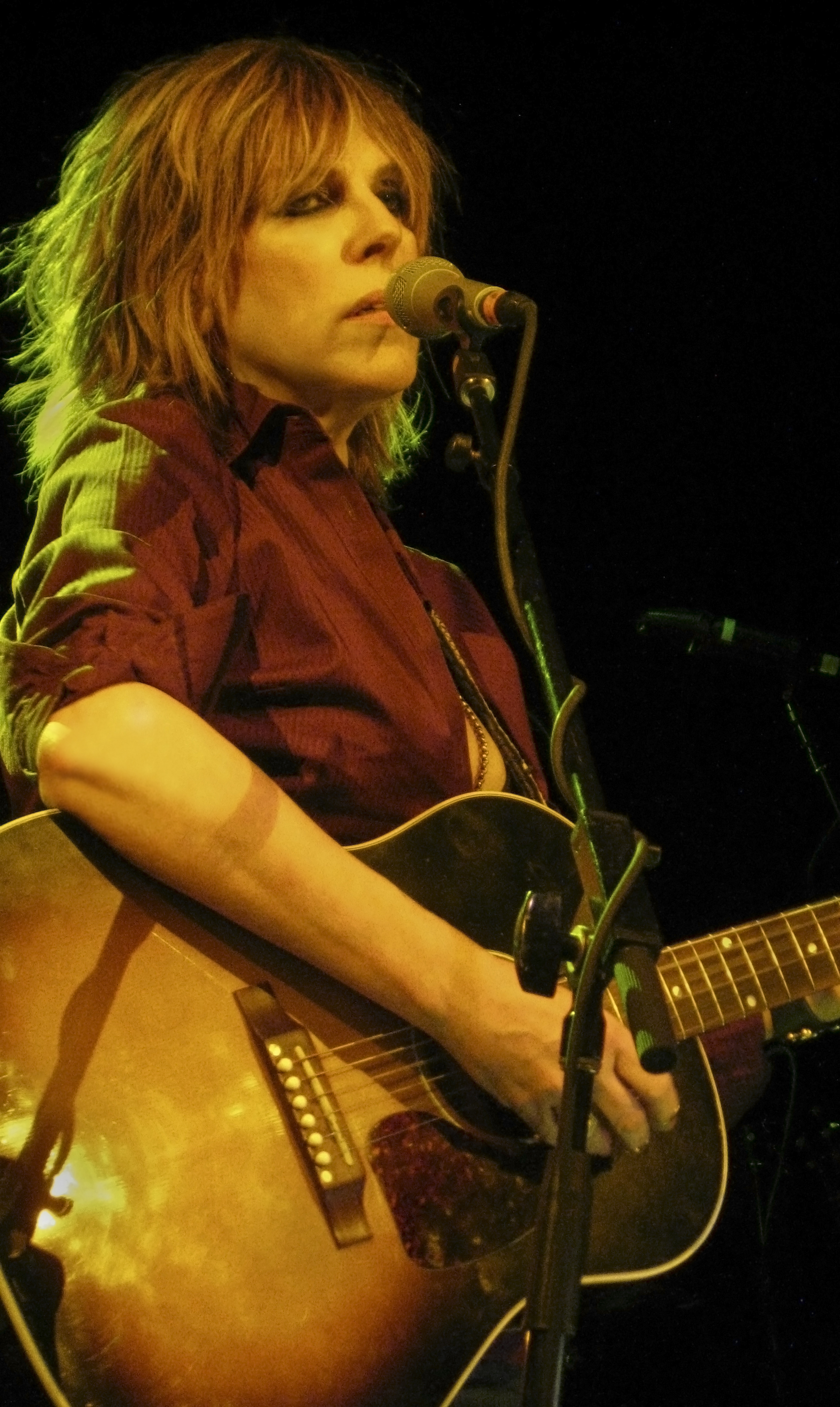
1994 winner Lucinda Williams

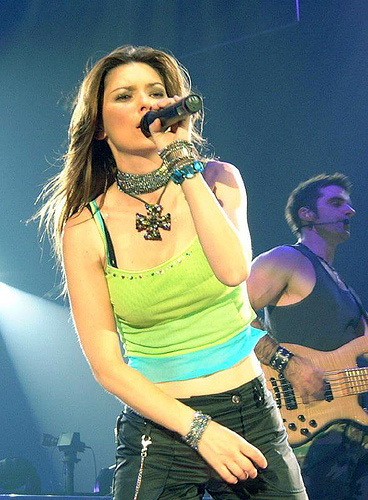
Two-time winner Shania Twain

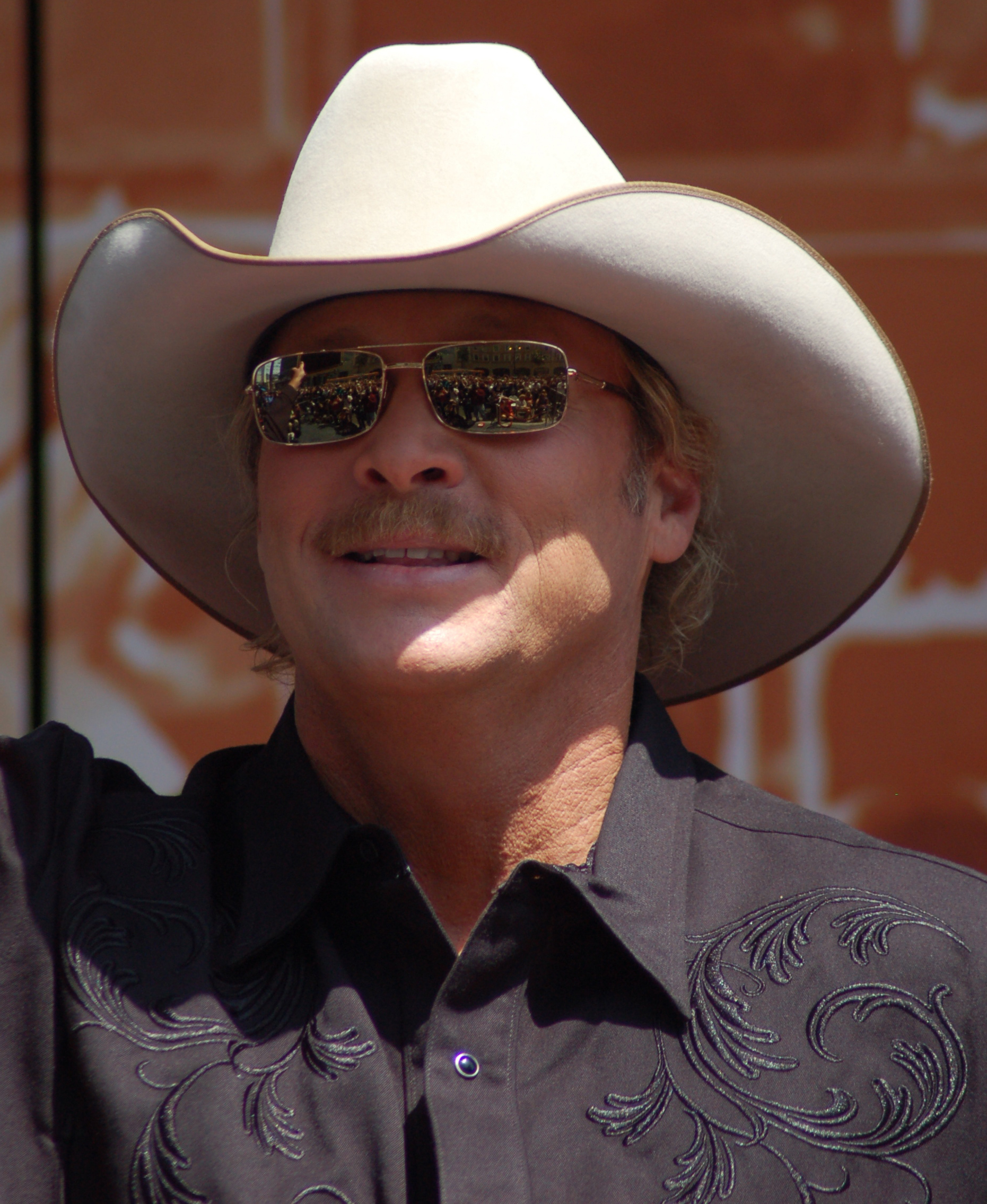
2003 winner Alan Jackson

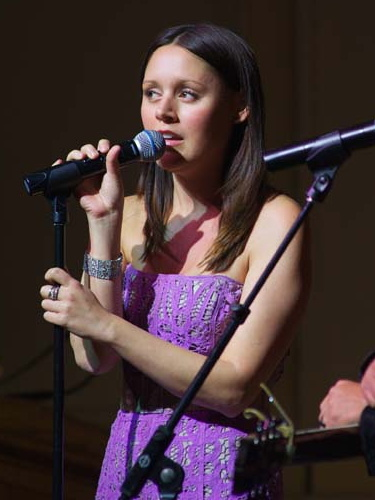
Two-time winner Hillary Lindsey

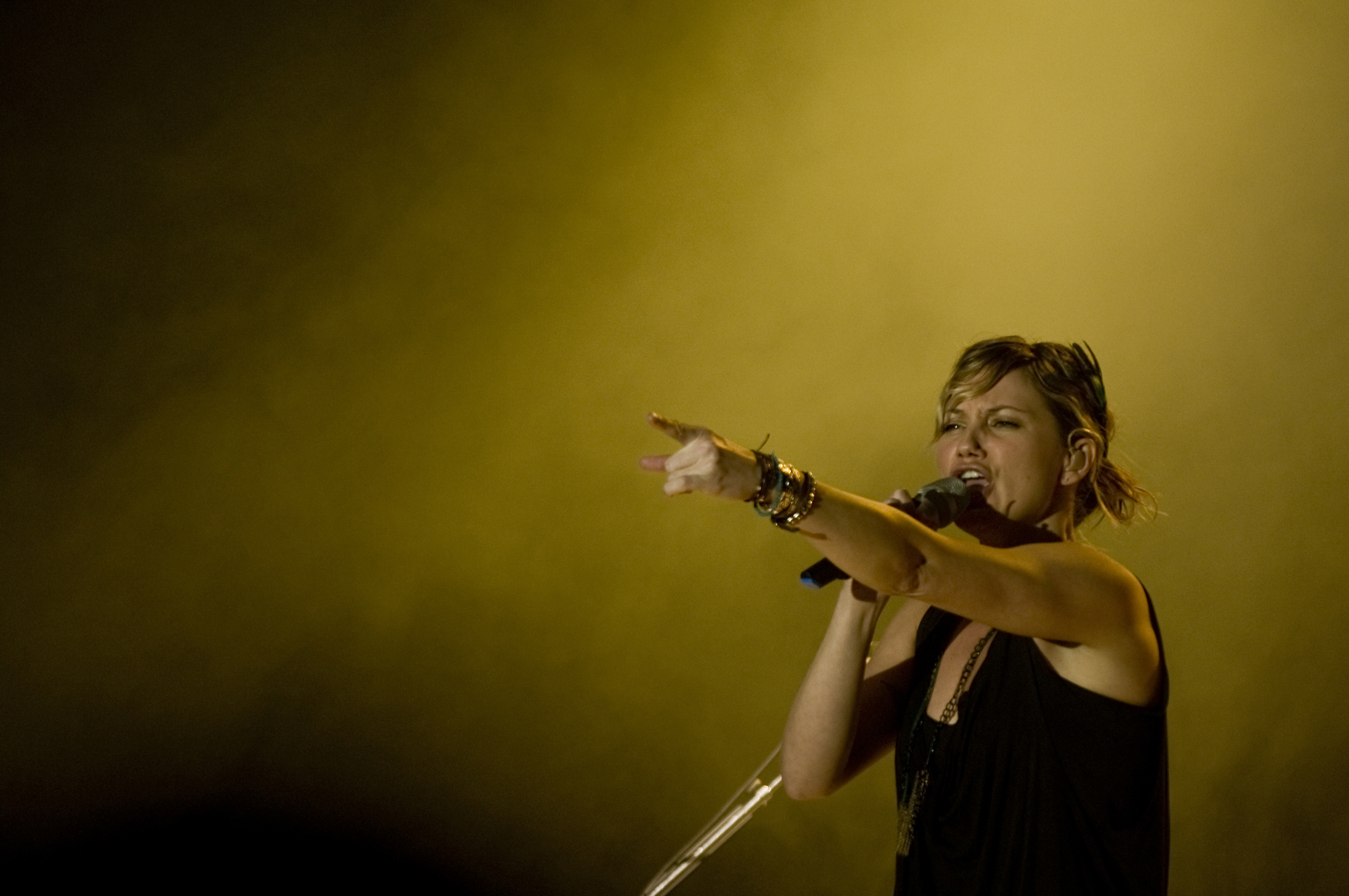
2009 winner, Jennifer Nettles from Sugarland

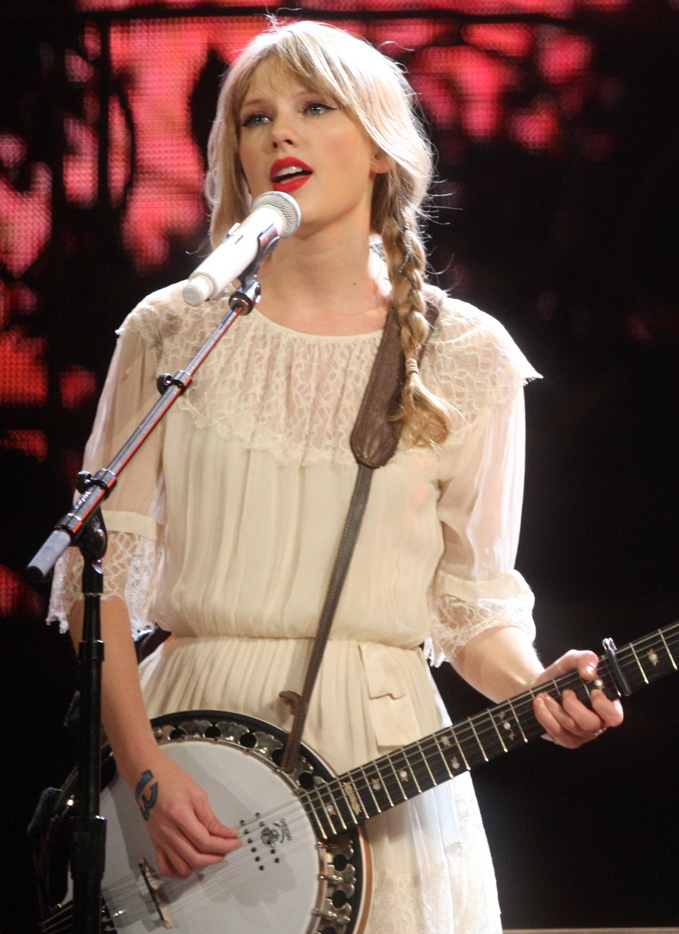
Two-time winner Taylor Swift

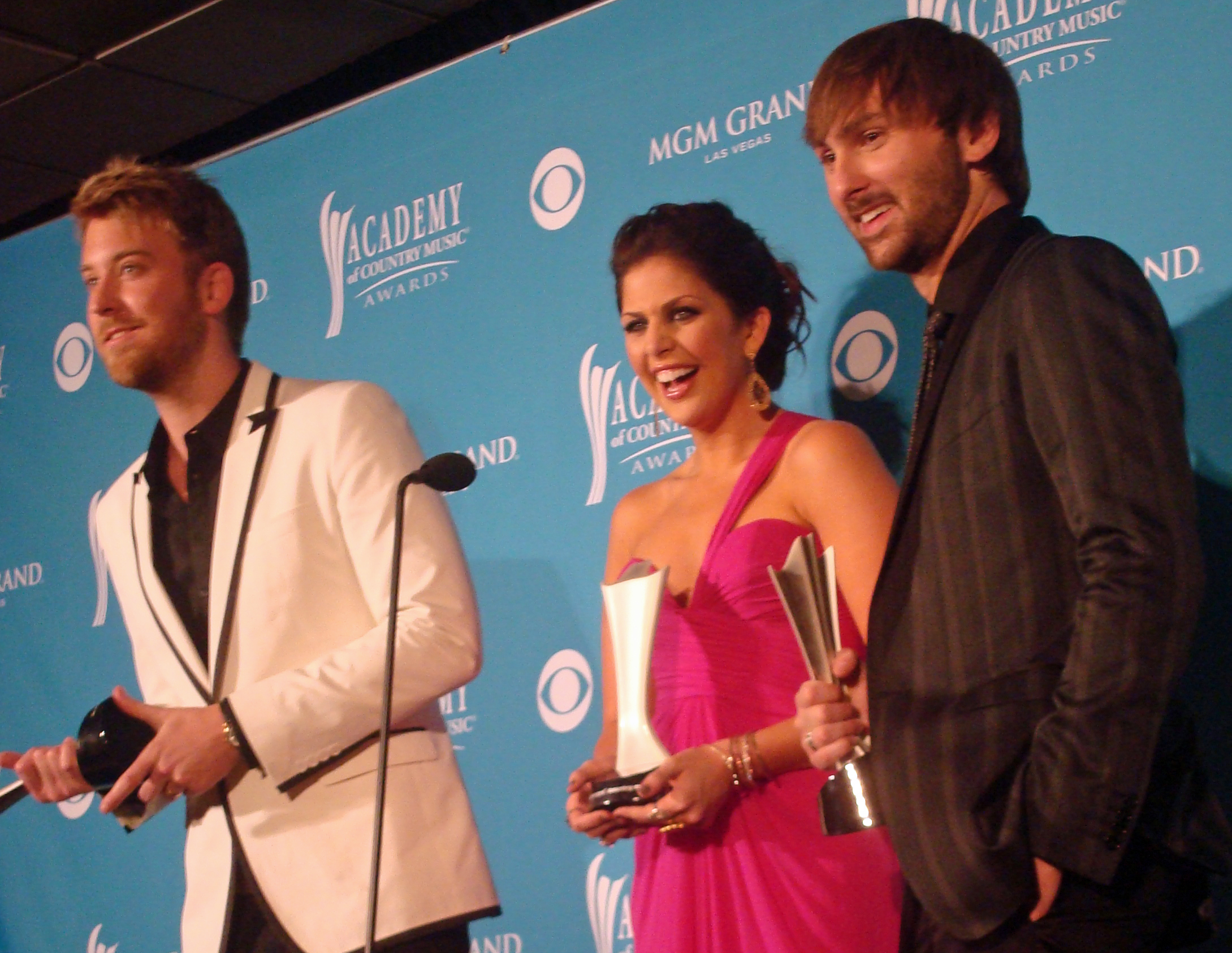
2011 winner Lady A

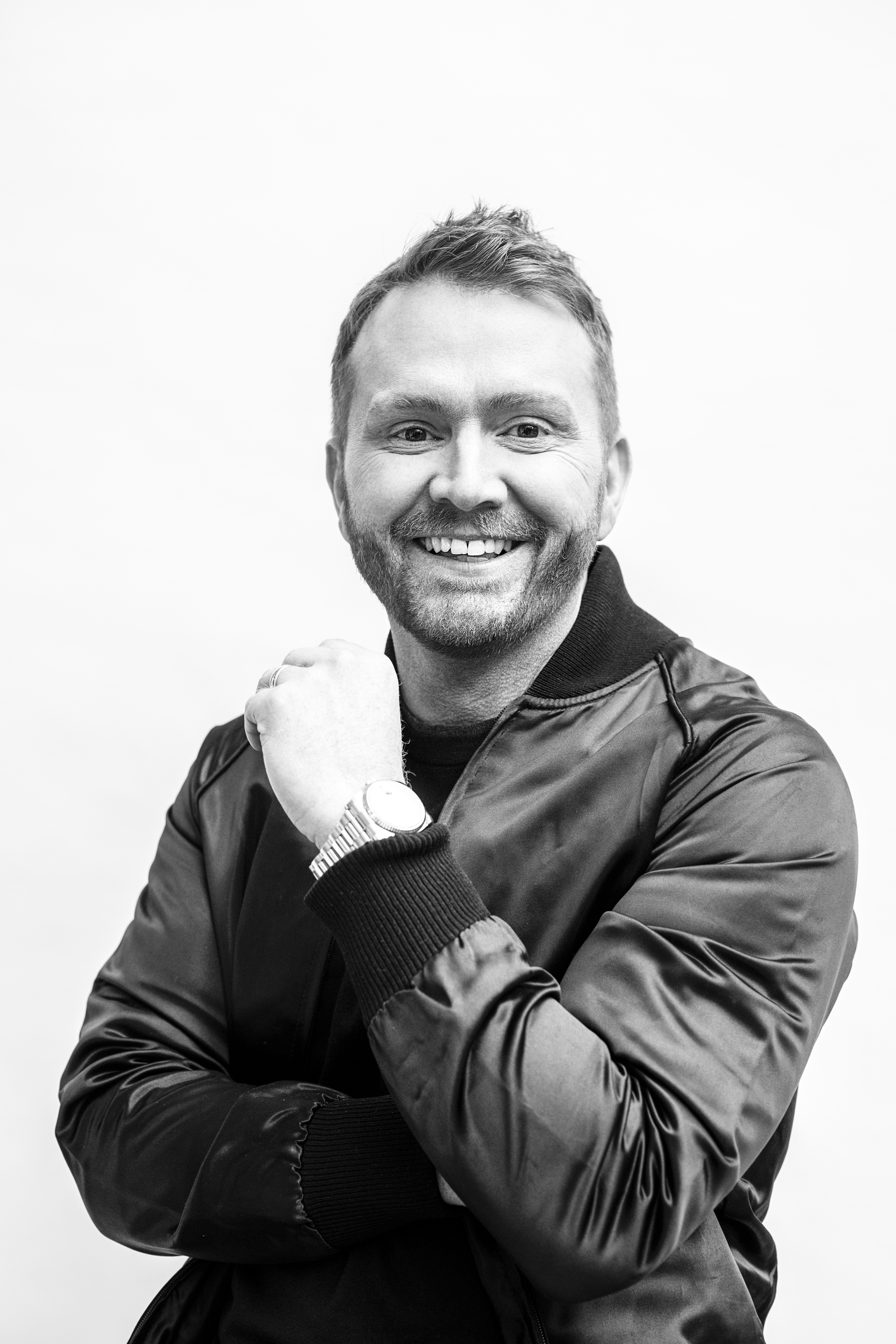
Two-time winner Shane McAnally

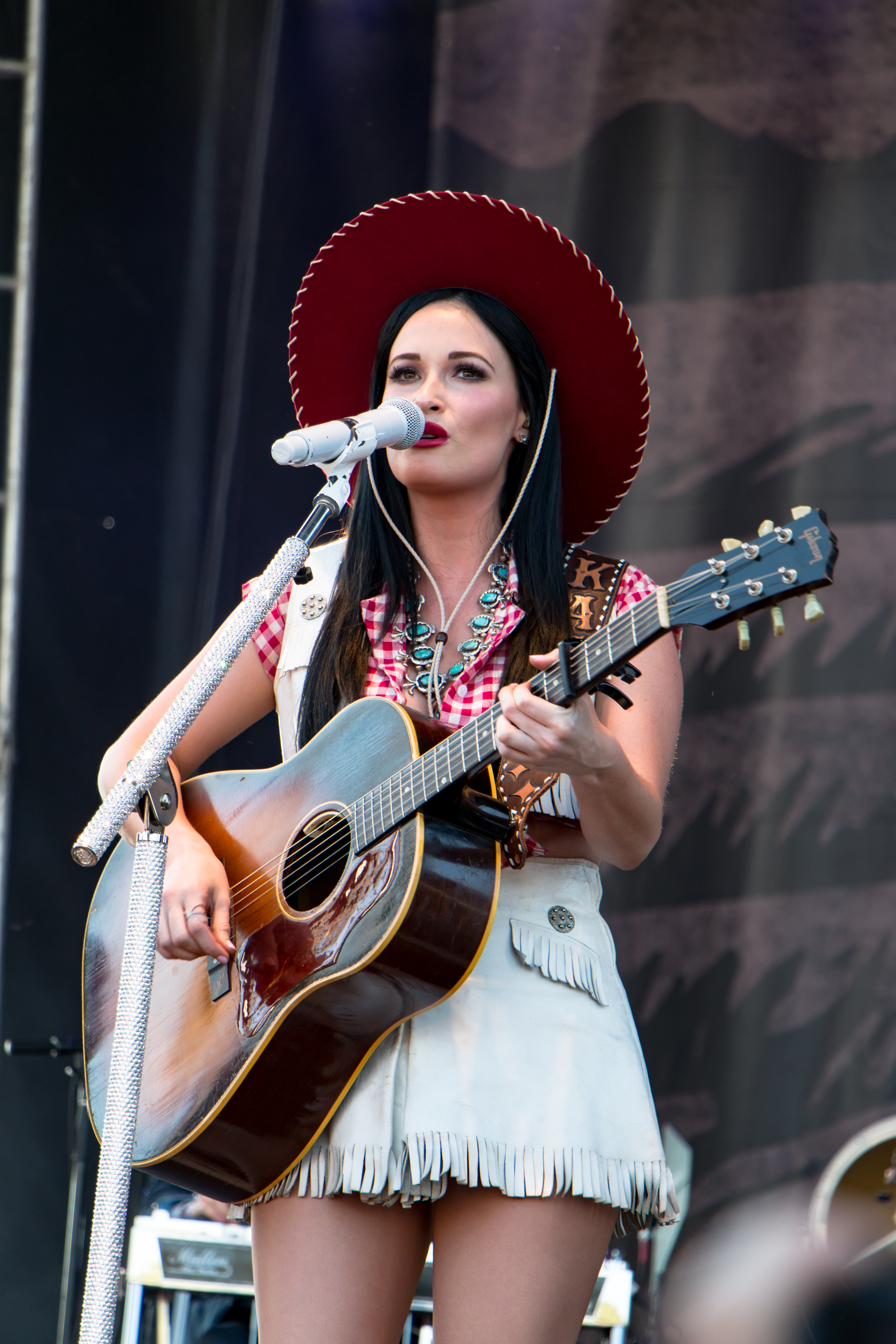
Three-time winner Kacey Musgraves

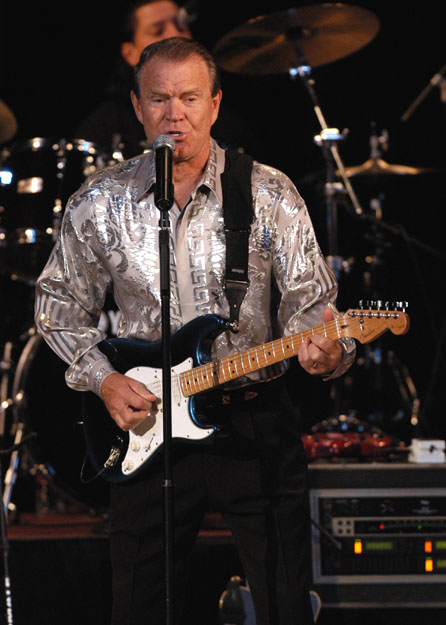
2015 winner Glen Campbell

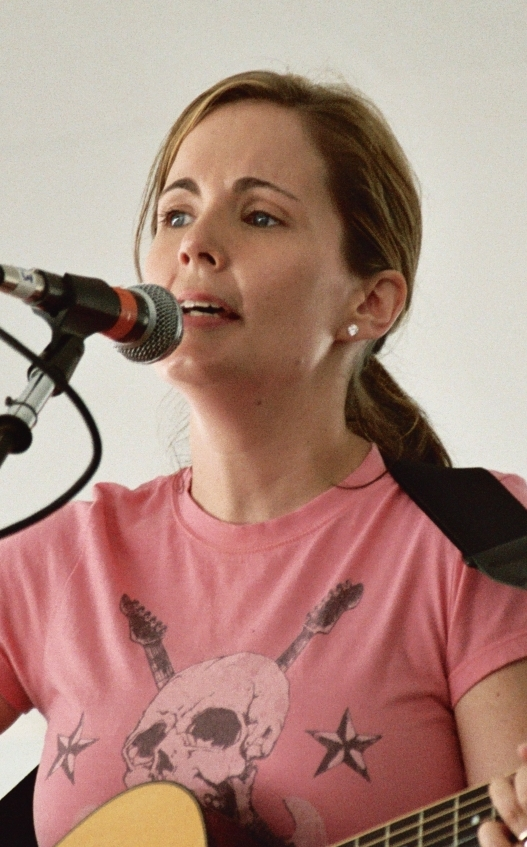
Three-time winner Lori McKenna

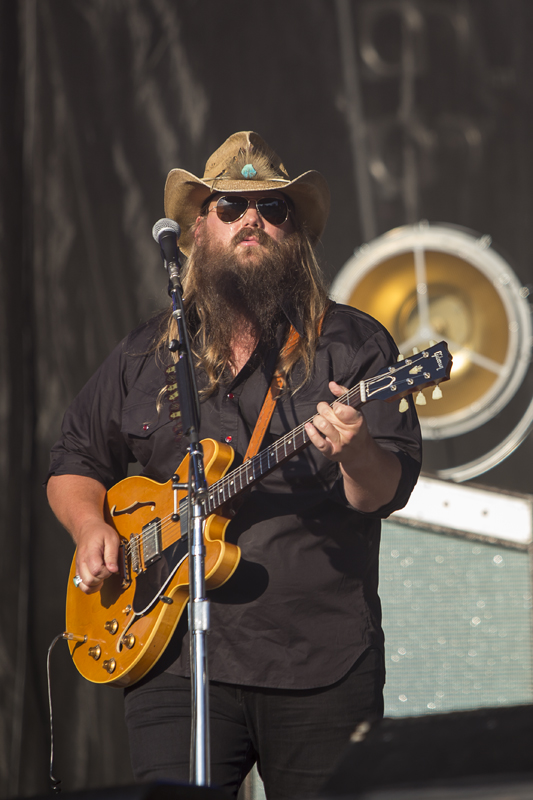
2018 winner Chris Stapleton

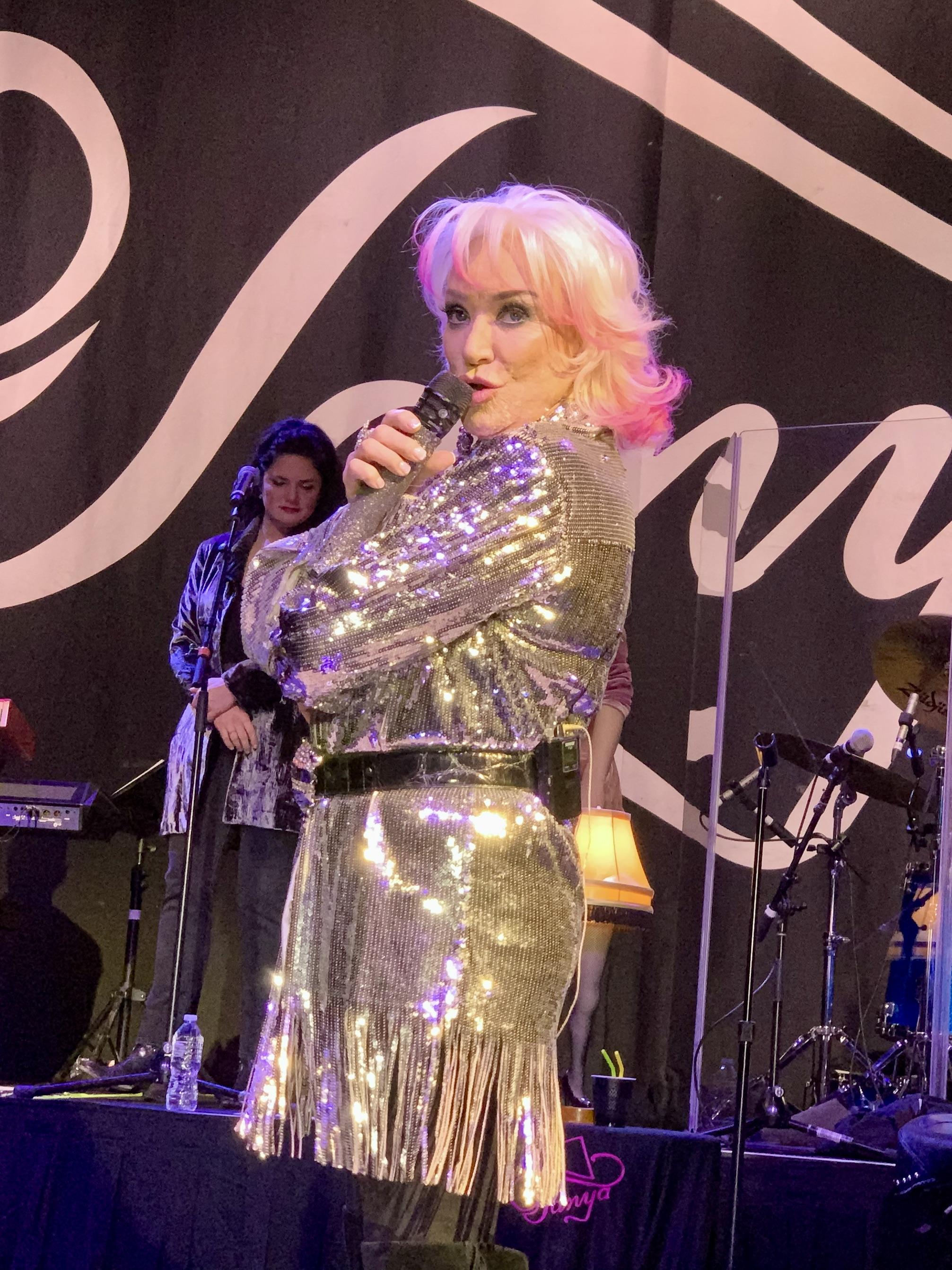
2020 winner Tanya Tucker

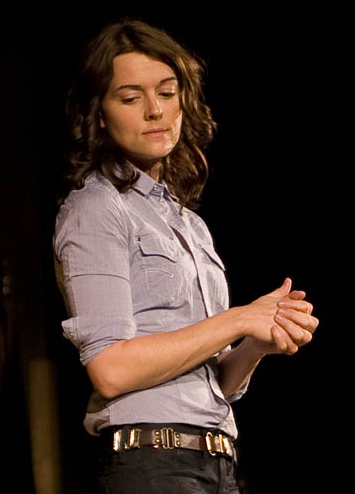
Two-time winner Brandi Carlile

=== 1960s ===
Year^{[I]}	Song	Songwriter(s)	Artist(s)
1965
1965	"Dang Me"	Roger Miller	Roger Miller
1965	"Here Comes My Baby"	Dottie West and Bill West	Dottie West
1965	"Once a Day"	Bill Anderson	Connie Smith
1965	"Wine, Women and Song"	Betty Sue Perry	Loretta Lynn
1965	"You're the Only World I Know"	Sonny James and Bob Tubert	Sonny James
1966
1966	"King of the Road"	Roger Miller	Roger Miller
1966	"Crystal Chandelier"	Ted Harris	Charley Pride
1966	"Flowers on the Wall"	Lew DeWitt	The Statler Brothers
1966	"May the Bird of Paradise Fly Up Your Nose"	Neal Merritt	Little Jimmy Dickens
1966	"What's He Doing in My World"	Carl Belew, B. J. Moore and Eddie Busch	Eddy Arnold
1967
1967	"Almost Persuaded"	Billy Sherrill and Glenn Sutton	David Houston
1967	"Don't Touch Me"	Hank Cochran	Jeannie Seely
1967	"Husband and Wives"	Roger Miller	Roger Miller
1967	"Streets of Baltimore"	Tompall Glaser and Harlan Howard	Bobby Bare
1967	"There Goes My Everything"	Dallas Frazier	Jack Greene
1968
1968	"Gentle on My Mind"	John Hartford	Glen Campbell
1968	"Break My Mind"	John D. Loudermilk	George Hamilton IV
1968	"The Cold Hard Facts of Life"	Bill Anderson	Porter Wagoner
1968	"Does My Ring Hurt Your Finger"	Don Robertson, John Crutchfield and Doris Clement	Charley Pride
1968	"It's Such a Pretty World Today"	Dale Noe	Wynn Stewart
1969
1969	"Little Green Apples"	Bobby Russell	Roger Miller
1969	"D-I-V-O-R-C-E"	Curly Putman and Bobby Braddock	Tammy Wynette
1969	"Harper Valley PTA"	Tom T. Hall	Jeannie C. Riley
1969	"Honey"	Bobby Russell	Bobby Goldsboro
1969	"Skip a Rope"	Glenn Douglas Tubb and Jack Moran	Henson Cargill

=== 1970s ===
Year^{[I]}	Song	Songwriter(s)	Artist(s)
1970
1970	"A Boy Named Sue"	Shel Silverstein	Johnny Cash
1970	"All I Have to Offer You (Is Me)"	Dallas Frazier and A. L. Owens	Charley Pride
1970	"Stand by Your Man"	Billy Sherrill and Tammy Wynette	Tammy Wynette
1970	"The Things That Matter"	Don Sumner	Van Trevor
1970	"You Gave Me a Mountain"	Marty Robbins	Frankie Laine
1971
1971	"My Woman, My Woman, My Wife"	Marty Robbins	Marty Robbins
1971	"The Fightin' Side of Me"	Merle Haggard	Merle Haggard
1971	"Hello Darlin'"	Conway Twitty	Conway Twitty
1971	"Is Anybody Goin' to San Antone"	Glenn Martin and Dave Kirby	Charley Pride
1971	"Wonder Could I Live There Anymore"	Bill Rice	Charley Pride
1972
1972	"Help Me Make It Through the Night"	Kris Kristofferson	Sammi Smith
1972	"Easy Loving"	Freddie Hart	Freddie Hart
1972	"For the Good Times"	Kris Kristofferson	Ray Price
1972	"Me and Bobby McGee"	Kris Kristofferson and Fred Foster	Gordon Lightfoot
1972	"Rose Garden"	Joe South	Lynn Anderson
1973
1973	"Kiss an Angel Good Mornin'"	Ben Peters	Charley Pride
1973	"Delta Dawn"	Alex Harvey and Larry Collins	Tanya Tucker
1973	"Funny Face"	Donna Fargo	Donna Fargo
1973	"The Happiest Girl in the Whole USA"	Donna Fargo	Donna Fargo
1973	"Woman (Sensuous Woman)"	Gary S. Paxton	Don Gibson
1974
1974	"Behind Closed Doors"	Kenny O'Dell	Charlie Rich
1974	"Country Sunshine"	Billy Davis and Dottie West	Dottie West
1974	"The Most Beautiful Girl"	Rory Bourke, Billy Sherrill and Norro Wilson	Charlie Rich
1974	"Old Dogs, Children and Watermelon Wine"	Tom T. Hall	Tom T. Hall
1974	"Why Me"	Kris Kristofferson	Kris Kristofferson
1975
1975	"A Very Special Love Song"	Norro Wilson and Billy Sherrill	Charlie Rich
1975	"Fairytale"	Anita Pointer and Bonnie Pointer	The Pointer Sisters
1975	"I'm a Ramblin' Man"	Ray Pennington	Waylon Jennings
1975	"If We Make It Through December"	Merle Haggard	Merle Haggard
1975	"Paper Roses"	Janice Torre and Fred Spielman	Marie Osmond
1976
1976	"(Hey Won't You Play) Another Somebody Done Somebody Wrong Song"	Chips Moman and Larry Butler	B. J. Thomas
1976	"Before the Next Teardrop Falls"	Vivian Keith and Ben Peters	Freddy Fender
1976	"Blue Eyes Crying in the Rain"	Fred Rose	Willie Nelson
1976	"I'm Not Lisa"	Jessi Colter	Jessi Colter
1976	"Thank God I'm a Country Boy"	John Martin Sommers	John Denver
1977
1977	"Broken Lady"	Larry Gatlin	Larry Gatlin
1977	"The Door Is Always Open"	Bob McDill and Dickey Lee	Dave & Sugar
1977	"Dropkick Me Jesus"	Paul Craft	Bobby Bare
1977	"Every Time You Touch Me (I Get High)"	Charlie Rich and Billy Sherrill	Charlie Rich
1977	"Hank Williams, You Wrote My Life"	Paul Craft	Moe Bandy
1978
1978	"Don't It Make My Brown Eyes Blue"	Richard Leigh	Crystal Gayle
1978	"Desperado"	Glenn Frey and Don Henley	Johnny Rodriguez
1978	"It Was Almost Like a Song"	Archie Jordan and Hal David	Ronnie Milsap
1978	"Lucille"	Roger Bowling and Hal Bynum	Kenny Rogers
1978	"Luckenbach, Texas"	Bobby Emmons and Chips Moman	Waylon Jennings
1979
1979	"The Gambler"	Don Schlitz	Kenny Rogers
1979	"Every Time Two Fools Collide"	Jan Dyer and Jeffrey Tweel	Kenny Rogers and Dottie West
1979	"Let's Take the Long Way Around the World"	Archie Jordan and Naomi Martin	Ronnie Milsap
1979	"Mamas Don't Let Your Babies Grow Up to Be Cowboys"	Ed Bruce and Patsy Bruce	Willie Nelson and Waylon Jennings
1979	"Take This Job and Shove It"	David Allan Coe	Johnny Paycheck

=== 1980s ===
Year^{[I]}	Song	Songwriter(s)	Artist(s)
1980
1980	"You Decorated My Life"	Debbie Hupp and Bob Morrison	Kenny Rogers
1980	"All the Gold in California"	Larry Gatlin	Larry Gatlin & the Gatlin Brothers
1980	"Blue Kentucky Girl"	Johnny Mullins	Emmylou Harris
1980	"Every Which Way But Loose"	Milton Brown, Steve Dorff and Snuff Garrett	Eddie Rabbitt
1980	"If I Said You Have a Beautiful Body Would You Hold It Against Me"	David Bellamy	The Bellamy Brothers
1981
1981	"On the Road Again"	Willie Nelson	Willie Nelson
1981	"Drivin' My Life Away"	David Malloy, Eddie Rabbitt and Even Stevens	Eddie Rabbitt
1981	"He Stopped Loving Her Today"	Bobby Braddock and Curly Putman	George Jones
1981	"I Believe in You"	Roger Cook and Sam Hogin	Don Williams
1981	"Lookin' for Love"	Bob Morrison, Wanda Mallette and Patti Ryan	Johnny Lee
1982
1982	"9 to 5"	Dolly Parton	Dolly Parton
1982	"Elvira"	Dallas Frazier	The Oak Ridge Boys
1982	"I Was Country When Country Wasn't Cool"	Kye Fleming and Dennis Morgan	Barbara Mandrell
1982	"Somebody's Knockin'"	Ed Penney and Jerry Gillespie	Terri Gibbs
1982	"You're the Reason God Made Oklahoma"	Larry Collins and Sandy Pinkard	David Frizzell and Shelly West
1983
1983	"Always on My Mind"	Wayne Carson, Johnny Christopher and Mark James	Willie Nelson
1983	"I'm Gonna Hire a Wino to Decorate Our Home"	Dewayne Blackwell	David Frizzell
1983	"Nobody"	Kye Fleming and Dennis Morgan	Sylvia
1983	"Ring on Her Finger, Time on Her Hands"	Don Goodman, Pam Rose and Mary Ann Kennedy	Lee Greenwood
1983	"She Got the Goldmine (I Got the Shaft)"	Tim DuBois	Jerry Reed
1984
1984	"Stranger in My House"	Mike Reid	Ronnie Milsap
1984	"Baby I Lied"	Deborah Allen, Rory Bourke and Rafe Van Hoy	Deborah Allen
1984	"I.O.U."	Kerry Chater and Austin Roberts	Lee Greenwood
1984	"Lady Down on Love"	Randy Owen	Alabama
1984	"A Little Good News"	Tommy Rocco, Charlie Black and Rory Bourke	Anne Murray
1985
1985	"City of New Orleans"	Steve Goodman	Willie Nelson
1985	"All My Rowdy Friends Are Coming Over Tonight"	Hank Williams Jr.	Hank Williams Jr.
1985	"Faithless Love"	JD Souther	Glen Campbell
1985	"God Bless the U.S.A."	Lee Greenwood	Lee Greenwood
1985	"Mama He's Crazy"	Kenny O'Dell	The Judds
1986
1986	"Highwayman"	Jimmy Webb	The Highwaymen
1986	"Baby's Got Her Blue Jeans On"	Bob McDill	Mel McDaniel
1986	"Desperados Waiting for a Train"	Guy Clark	The Highwaymen
1986	"40 Hour Week (For a Livin')"	Dave Loggins, Lisa Silver and Don Schlitz	Alabama
1986	"I Don't Know Why You Don't Want Me"	Rosanne Cash and Rodney Crowell	Rosanne Cash
1986	"Lost in the Fifties Tonight (In the Still of the Night)"	Mike Reid, Troy Seals and Fred Parris	Ronnie Milsap
1986	"Love Is Alive"	Kent Robbins	The Judds
1987
1987	"Grandpa (Tell Me 'Bout the Good Ol' Days)"	Jamie O'Hara	The Judds
1987	"Daddy's Hands"	Holly Dunn	Holly Dunn
1987	"Guitar Town"	Steve Earle	Steve Earle
1987	"Guitars, Cadillacs"	Dwight Yoakam	Dwight Yoakam
1987	"Whoever's in New England"	Kendal Franceschi and Quentin Powers	Reba McEntire
1988
1988	"Forever and Ever, Amen"	Paul Overstreet and Don Schlitz	Randy Travis
1988	"All My Ex's Live in Texas"	Sanger D. Shafer and Lyndia J. Shafer	George Strait
1988	"80's Ladies"	K. T. Oslin	K. T. Oslin
1988	"I'll Still Be Loving You"	Todd Cerney, Mary Ann Kennedy, Pat Bunch and Pam Rose	Restless Heart
1988	"Telling Me Lies"	Betsy Cook and Linda Thompson	Dolly Parton, Linda Ronstadt and Emmylou Harris
1989
1989	"Hold Me"	K. T. Oslin	K. T. Oslin
1989	"Chiseled in Stone"	Vern Gosdin and Max D. Barnes	Vern Gosdin
1989	"I Couldn't Leave You If I Tried"	Rodney Crowell	Rodney Crowell
1989	"She's No Lady"	Lyle Lovett	Lyle Lovett
1989	"Streets of Bakersfield"	Homer Joy	Dwight Yoakam with Buck Owens

=== 1990s ===
Year^{[I]}	Song	Songwriter(s)	Artist(s)
1990
1990	"After All This Time"	Rodney Crowell	Rodney Crowell
1990	"A Better Man"	Clint Black and Hayden Nicholas	Clint Black
1990	"Luck in My Eyes"	k.d. lang and Ben Mink	k.d. lang
1990	"She Don't Love Nobody"	John Hiatt	The Desert Rose Band
1990	"There's a Tear in My Beer"	Hank Williams	Hank Williams and Hank Williams Jr.
1991
1991	"Where've You Been"	Don Henry and Jon Vezner	Kathy Mattea
1991	"Come Next Monday"	K. T. Oslin, Rory Michael Bourke and Charlie Black	K. T. Oslin
1991	"The Dance"	Tony Arata	Garth Brooks
1991	"Friends in Low Places"	DeWayne Blackwell and Earl Bud Lee	Garth Brooks
1991	"When I Call Your Name"	Vince Gill and Tim DuBois	Vince Gill
1992
1992	"Love Can Build a Bridge"	John Barlow Jarvis, Naomi Judd and Paul Overstreet	The Judds
1992	"Don't Rock the Jukebox"	Alan Jackson, Roger Murrah and Keith Stegall	Alan Jackson
1992	"Down at the Twist and Shout"	Mary Chapin Carpenter	Mary Chapin Carpenter
1992	"Eagle When She Flies"	Dolly Parton	Dolly Parton
1992	"Here's a Quarter (Call Someone Who Cares)"	Travis Tritt	Travis Tritt
1993
1993	"I Still Believe in You"	Vince Gill and John Barlow Jarvis	Vince Gill
1993	"Achy Breaky Heart"	Don Von Tress	Billy Ray Cyrus
1993	"The Greatest Man I Never Knew"	Richard Leigh and Layng Martine Jr.	Reba McEntire
1993	"I Feel Lucky"	Mary Chapin Carpenter and Don Schlitz	Mary Chapin Carpenter
1993	"She Is His Only Need"	Dave Loggins	Wynonna Judd
1994
1994	"Passionate Kisses"	Lucinda Williams	Mary Chapin Carpenter
1994	"Ain't That Lonely Yet"	Kostas and James House	Dwight Yoakam
1994	"Chattahoochee"	Alan Jackson and Jim McBride	Alan Jackson
1994	"Does He Love You"	Sandy Knox and Billy Stritch	Reba McEntire and Linda Davis
1994	"The Hard Way"	Mary Chapin Carpenter	Mary Chapin Carpenter
1995
1995	"I Swear"	Gary Baker and Frank J. Myers	John Michael Montgomery
1995	"How Can I Help You Say Goodbye"	Burton Banks Collins and Karen Taylor-Good	Patty Loveless
1995	"Independence Day"	Gretchen Peters	Martina McBride
1995	"Shut Up and Kiss Me"	Mary Chapin Carpenter	Mary Chapin Carpenter
1995	"When Love Finds You"	Vince Gill and Michael Omartian	Vince Gill
1996
1996	"Go Rest High on That Mountain"	Vince Gill	Vince Gill
1996	"Any Man of Mine"	Robert John "Mutt" Lange and Shania Twain	Shania Twain
1996	"Gone Country"	Bob McDill	Alan Jackson
1996	"I Can Love You Like That"	Maribeth Derry, Steve Diamond and Jennifer Kimball	John Michael Montgomery
1996	"You Don't Even Know Who I Am"	Gretchen Peters	Patty Loveless
1997
1997	"Blue"	Bill Mack	LeAnn Rimes
1997	"Believe Me Baby (I Lied)"	Angelo Petraglia, Larry Gottlieb and Kim Richey	Trisha Yearwood
1997	"High Lonesome Sound"	Vince Gill	Vince Gill featuring Alison Krauss & Union Station
1997	"My Wife Thinks You're Dead"	Junior Brown	Junior Brown
1997	"Strawberry Wine"	Matraca Berg and Gary Harrison	Deana Carter
1998
1998	"Butterfly Kisses"	Bob Carlisle and Randy Thomas	Bob Carlisle
1998	"All the Good Ones Are Gone"	Bob McDill and Dean Dillon	Pam Tillis
1998	"Did I Shave My Legs for This?"	Deana Carter and Rhonda Hart	Deana Carter
1998	"In Another's Eyes"	Bobby Wood, John Peppard and Garth Brooks	Garth Brooks and Trisha Yearwood
1998	"It's Your Love"	Stephony Smith	Tim McGraw and Faith Hill
1999
1999	"You're Still the One"	Robert John "Mutt" Lange and Shania Twain	Shania Twain
1999	"Holes in the Floor of Heaven"	Billy Kirsch and Steve Wariner	Steve Wariner
1999	"If You Ever Have Forever in Mind"	Vince Gill and Troy Seals	Vince Gill
1999	"This Kiss"	Beth Nielsen Chapman, Robin Lerner and Annie Roboff	Faith Hill
1999	"To Make You Feel My Love"	Bob Dylan	Garth Brooks

=== 2000s ===
Year^{[I]}	Song	Songwriter(s)	Artist(s)
2000
2000	"Come On Over"	Robert John "Mutt" Lange and Shania Twain	Shania Twain
2000	"Amazed"	Marv Green, Chris Lindsey and Aimee Mayo	Lonestar
2000	"Choices"	Mike Curtis and Billy Yates	George Jones
2000	"Ready to Run"	Marcus Hummon and Martie Seidel	Dixie Chicks
2000	"Two Teardrops"	Bill Anderson and Steve Wariner	Steve Wariner
2001
2001	"I Hope You Dance"	Mark D. Sanders and Tia Sillers	Lee Ann Womack
2001	"Breathe"	Stephanie Bentley and Holly Lamar	Faith Hill
2001	"Feels Like Love"	Vince Gill	Vince Gill
2001	"One Voice"	Don Cook and David Malloy	Billy Gilman
2001	"The Way You Love Me"	Michael Dulaney and Keith Follese	Faith Hill
2002
2002	"The Lucky One"	Robert Lee Castleman	Alison Krauss & Union Station
2002	"I'm Already There"	Gary Baker, Richie McDonald and Frank Myers	Lonestar
2002	"One More Day"	Steven Dale Jones and Bobby Tomberlin	Diamond Rio
2002	"There Is No Arizona"	Lisa Drew, Jamie O'Neal and Shaye Smith	Jamie O'Neal
2002	"When I Think About Angels"	Roxie Dean, Jamie O'Neal and Sonny Tillis	Jamie O'Neal
2003
2003	"Where Were You (When the World Stopped Turning)"	Alan Jackson	Alan Jackson
2003	"The Impossible"	Kelley Lovelace and Lee Thomas Miller	Joe Nichols
2003	"Long Time Gone"	Darrell Scott	Dixie Chicks
2003	"Mendocino County Line"	Matt Serletic and Bernie Taupin	Willie Nelson and Lee Ann Womack
2003	"Three Days"	Radney Foster and Pat Green	Pat Green
2004
2004	"It's Five O'Clock Somewhere"	Jim "Moose" Brown and Don Rollins	Alan Jackson and Jimmy Buffett
2004	"Beer for My Horses"	Scotty Emerick and Toby Keith	Willie Nelson and Toby Keith
2004	"Celebrity"	Brad Paisley	Brad Paisley
2004	"Forever and for Always"	Robert John "Mutt" Lange and Shania Twain	Shania Twain
2004	"Wave on Wave"	Pat Green, David Neuhauser and Justin Pollard	Pat Green
2005
2005	"Live Like You Were Dying"	Tim Nichols and Craig Wiseman	Tim McGraw
2005	"It's Hard to Kiss the Lips at Night That Chew Your Ass Out All Day Long"	Rodney Crowell and Vince Gill	Notorious Cherry Bombs
2005	"Miss Being Mrs."	Loretta Lynn	Loretta Lynn
2005	"Portland Oregon"	Loretta Lynn and Allen Shamblin	Loretta Lynn and Jack White
2005	"Redneck Woman"	John Rich and Gretchen Wilson	Gretchen Wilson
2006
2006	"Bless the Broken Road"	Bobby Boyd, Jeff Hanna and Marcus Hummon	Rascal Flatts
2006	"Alcohol"	Brad Paisley	Brad Paisley
2006	"All Jacked Up"	Vicky McGehee, John Rich and Gretchen Wilson	Gretchen Wilson
2006	"I Hope"	Keb Mo', Martie Maguire, Natalie Maines and Emily Robison	Dixie Chicks
2006	"I May Hate Myself in the Morning"	Odie Blackmon	Lee Ann Womack
2007
2007	"Jesus, Take the Wheel"	Hillary Lindsey, Brett James and Gordie Sampson	Carrie Underwood
2007	"Every Mile a Memory"	Brett Beavers, Dierks Bentley and Steve Bogard	Dierks Bentley
2007	"I Don't Feel Like Loving You Today"	Matraca Berg and Jim Collins	Gretchen Wilson
2007	"Like Red on a Rose"	Melanie Castleman and Robert Lee Castleman	Alan Jackson
2007	"What Hurts the Most"	Steve Robson and Jeffrey Steele	Rascal Flatts
2008
2008	"Before He Cheats"	Chris Tompkins and Josh Kear	Carrie Underwood
2008	"Give It Away"	Bill Anderson, Buddy Cannon and Jamey Johnson	George Strait
2008	"I Need You"	Tony Lane and David Lee	Tim McGraw featuring Faith Hill
2008	"If You're Reading This"	Tim McGraw, Brad Warren and Brett Warren	Tim McGraw
2008	"Long Trip Alone"	Brett Beavers, Dierks Bentley and Steve Bogard	Dierks Bentley
2009
2009	"Stay"	Jennifer Nettles	Sugarland
2009	"Dig Two Graves"	Ashley Gorley and Bob Regan	Randy Travis
2009	"I Saw God Today"	Rodney Clawson, Monty Criswell and Wade Kirby	George Strait
2009	"In Color"	Jamey Johnson, Lee Thomas Miller and James Otto	Jamey Johnson
2009	"You're Gonna Miss This"	Ashley Gorley and Lee Thomas Miller	Trace Adkins

=== 2010s ===
Year^{[I]}	Song	Songwriter(s)	Artist(s)
2010
2010	"White Horse"	Liz Rose and Taylor Swift	Taylor Swift
2010	"All I Ask for Anymore"	Casey Beathard and Tim James	Trace Adkins
2010	"High Cost of Living"	Jamey Johnson and James T. Slater	Jamey Johnson
2010	"I Run to You"	Tom Douglas, Dave Haywood, Charles Kelley and Hillary Scott	Lady Antebellum
2010	"People Are Crazy"	Bobby Braddock and Troy Jones	Billy Currington
2011
2011	"Need You Now"	Dave Haywood, Josh Kear, Charles Kelley and Hillary Scott	Lady Antebellum
2011	"The Breath You Take"	Casey Beathard, Dean Dillon and Jessie Jo Dillon	George Strait
2011	"Free"	Zac Brown	Zac Brown Band
2011	"The House That Built Me"	Tom Douglas and Allen Shamblin	Miranda Lambert
2011	"I'd Love to Be Your Last"	Rivers Rutherford, Annie Tate and Sam Tate	Gretchen Wilson
2011	"If I Die Young"	Kimberly Perry	The Band Perry
2012
2012	"Mean"	Taylor Swift	Taylor Swift
2012	"Are You Gonna Kiss Me or Not"	Jim Collins and David Lee Murphy	Thompson Square
2012	"God Gave Me You"	Dave Barnes	Blake Shelton
2012	"Just Fishin'""	Casey Beathard, Monty Criswell and Ed Hill	Trace Adkins
2012	"Threaten Me with Heaven"	Vince Gill, Amy Grant, Will Owsley and Dillan O'Brian	Vince Gill
2012	"You and Tequila"	Matraca Berg and Deana Carter	Kenny Chesney featuring Grace Potter
2013
2013	"Blown Away"	Josh Kear and Chris Tompkins	Carrie Underwood
2013	"Cost of Livin'"	Philip Coleman and Ronnie Dunn	Ronnie Dunn
2013	"Even If It Breaks Your Heart"	Will Hoge and Eric Paslay	Eli Young Band
2013	"So You Don't Have to Love Me Anymore"	Jay Knowles and Adam Wright	Alan Jackson
2013	"Springsteen"	Eric Church, Jeff Hyde and Ryan Tyndell	Eric Church
2014
2014	"Merry Go 'Round"	Shane McAnally, Kacey Musgraves and Josh Osborne	Kacey Musgraves
2014	"Begin Again"	Taylor Swift	Taylor Swift
2014	"I Drive Your Truck"	Jessi Alexander, Connie Harrington and Jimmy Yeary	Lee Brice
2014	"Mama's Broken Heart"	Brandy Clark, Shane McAnally and Kacey Musgraves	Miranda Lambert
2014	"Mine Would Be You"	Jessi Alexander, Connie Harrington and Deric Ruttan	Blake Shelton
2015
2015	"I'm Not Gonna Miss You"	Glen Campbell and Julian Raymond	Glen Campbell
2015	"American Kids"	Rodney Clawson, Luke Laird and Shane McAnally	Kenny Chesney
2015	"Automatic"	Nicolle Galyon, Natalie Hemby and Miranda Lambert	Miranda Lambert
2015	"Give Me Back My Hometown"	Eric Church and Luke Laird	Eric Church
2015	"Meanwhile Back at Mama's"	Tom Douglas, Jaren Johnston and Jeffrey Steele	Tim McGraw featuring Faith Hill
2016
2016	"Girl Crush"	Hillary Lindsey, Lori McKenna and Liz Rose	Little Big Town
2016	"Chances Are"	Hayes Carll	Lee Ann Womack
2016	"Diamond Rings and Old Barstools"	Barry Dean, Luke Laird and Jonathan Singleton	Tim McGraw
2016	"Hold My Hand"	Brandy Clark and Mark Stephen Jones	Brandy Clark
2016	"Traveller"	Chris Stapleton	Chris Stapleton
2017
2017	"Humble and Kind"	Lori McKenna	Tim McGraw
2017	"Blue Ain't Your Color"	Clint Langenberg, Hillary Lindsey and Steven Lee Olsen	Keith Urban
2017	"Die a Happy Man"	Sean Douglas, Thomas Rhett and Joe Spargur	Thomas Rhett
2017	"My Church"	Michael James Ryan Busbee and Maren Morris	Maren Morris
2017	"Vice"	Miranda Lambert, Shane McAnally and Josh Osborne	Miranda Lambert
2018
2018	"Broken Halos"	Mike Henderson and Chris Stapleton	Chris Stapleton
2018	"Better Man"	Taylor Swift	Little Big Town
2018	"Body Like a Back Road"	Zach Crowell, Sam Hunt, Shane McAnally and Josh Osborne	Sam Hunt
2018	"Drinkin' Problem"	Jess Carson, Cameron Duddy, Shane McAnally, Josh Osborne and Mark Wystrach	Midland
2018	"Tin Man"	Jack Ingram, Miranda Lambert and Jon Randall	Miranda Lambert
2019
2019	"Space Cowboy"	Luke Laird, Shane McAnally and Kacey Musgraves	Kacey Musgraves
2019	"Break Up in the End"	Jessie Jo Dillon, Chase McGill and Jon Nite	Cole Swindell
2019	"Dear Hate"	Tom Douglas, David Hodges and Maren Morris	Maren Morris with Vince Gill
2019	"I Lived It"	Rhett Akins, Ross Copperman, Ashley Gorley and Ben Hayslip	Blake Shelton
2019	"Tequila"	Nicolle Galyon, Jordan Reynolds and Dan Smyers	Dan + Shay
2019	"When Someone Stops Loving You"	Hillary Lindsey, Chase McGill and Lori McKenna	Little Big Town

=== 2020s ===
Year^{[I]}	Song	Songwriter(s)	Artist(s)
2020
2020	"Bring My Flowers Now"	Brandi Carlile, Phil Hanseroth, Tim Hanseroth and Tanya Tucker	Tanya Tucker
2020	"Girl Goin' Nowhere"	Jeremy Bussey and Ashley McBryde	Ashley McBryde
2020	"It All Comes Out in the Wash"	Miranda Lambert, Hillary Lindsey, Lori McKenna and Liz Rose	Miranda Lambert
2020	"Some of It"	Eric Church, Clint Daniels, Jeff Hyde and Bobby Pinson	Eric Church
2020	"Speechless"	Shay Mooney, Jordan Reynolds, Dan Smyers and Laura Veltz	Dan + Shay
2021
2021	"Crowded Table"	Brandi Carlile, Natalie Hemby and Lori McKenna	The Highwomen
2021	"Bluebird"	Luke Dick, Natalie Hemby and Miranda Lambert	Miranda Lambert
2021	"The Bones"	Maren Morris, Jimmy Robbins and Laura Veltz	Maren Morris
2021	"More Hearts Than Mine"	Ingrid Andress, Sam Ellis and Derrick Southerland	Ingrid Andress
2021	"Some People Do"	Jesse Frasure, Shane McAnally, Matthew Ramsey and Thomas Rhett	Old Dominion
2022
2022	"Cold"	Dave Cobb, J.T. Cure, Derek Mixon and Chris Stapleton	Chris Stapleton
2022	"Better Than We Found It"	Jessie Jo Dillon, Maren Morris, Jimmy Robbins and Laura Veltz	Maren Morris
2022	"Camera Roll"	Ian Fitchuk, Kacey Musgraves and Daniel Tashian	Kacey Musgraves
2022	"Country Again"	Zach Crowell, Ashley Gorley and Thomas Rhett	Thomas Rhett
2022	"Fancy Like"	Cameron Bartolini, Walker Hayes, Josh Jenkins and Shane Stevens	Walker Hayes
2022	"Remember Her Name"	Mickey Guyton, Blake Hubbard, Jarrod Ingram and Parker Welling	Mickey Guyton
2023
2023	"'Til You Can't"	Matt Rogers and Ben Stennis	Cody Johnson
2023	"Circles Around This Town"	Ryan Hurd, Julia Michaels, Maren Morris and Jimmy Robbins	Maren Morris
2023	"Doin' This"	Luke Combs, Drew Parker and Robert Williford	Luke Combs
2023	"I Bet You Think About Me"	Lori McKenna and Taylor Swift	Taylor Swift featuring Chris Stapleton
2023	"If I Was a Cowboy"	Jesse Frasure and Miranda Lambert	Miranda Lambert
2023	"I'll Love You Till the Day I Die"	Rodney Crowell and Chris Stapleton	Willie Nelson
2024
2024	"White Horse"	Chris Stapleton and Dan Wilson	Chris Stapleton
2024	"Buried"	Brandy Clark and Jessie Jo Dillon	Brandy Clark
2024	"I Remember Everything"	Zach Bryan and Kacey Musgraves	Zach Bryan and Kacey Musgraves
2024	"In Your Love"	Tyler Childers and Geno Seale	Tyler Childers
2024	"Last Night"	John Byron, Ashley Gorley, Jacob Kasher Hindin and Ryan Vojtesak	Morgan Wallen
2025
2025	"The Architect"	Shane McAnally, Kacey Musgraves and Josh Osborne	Kacey Musgraves
2025	"A Bar Song (Tipsy)"	Sean Cook, Jerrel Jones, Joe Kent, Collins Obinna Chibueze, Nevin Sastry and Mark Williams	Shaboozey
2025	"I Am Not Okay"	Casey Brown, Jason DeFord, Ashley Gorley and Taylor Phillips	Jelly Roll
2025	"I Had Some Help"	Louis Bell, Ashley Gorley, Hoskins, Austin Post, Ernest Smith, Ryan Vojtesak, Morgan Wallen and Chandler Paul Walters	Post Malone featuring Morgan Wallen
2025	"Texas Hold 'Em"	Brian Bates, Beyoncé, Elizabeth Lowell Boland, Atia Boggs, Megan Bülow, Nathan Ferraro and Raphael Saadiq	Beyoncé
2026
2026	"Bitin' List"	Tyler Childers	Tyler Childers
2026	"Good News"	Sean Cook, Collins Obinna Chibueze, Michael Ross Pollack, Sam Elliot Roman, Nevin Sastry and Jacob Torrey	Shaboozey
2026	"I Never Lie"	Carson Chamberlain, Tim Nichols and Zach Top	Zach Top
2026	"Somewhere Over Laredo"	Andy Albert, Trannie Anderson, Dallas Wilson and Lainey Wilson	Lainey Wilson
2026	"A Song to Sing"	Jenee Fleenor, Jesse Frasure, Miranda Lambert and Chris Stapleton	Miranda Lambert and Chris Stapleton
2027	"Beautiful Things"	Jessi Alexander, Jessie Jo Dillon, Connie Harrington and Megan Moroney	Megan Moroney
2027	"Choosin' Texas"	Luke Dick, Miranda Lambert, Ella Langley and Joybeth Taylor	Ella Langley
2027	"Dry Spell"	Luke Laird, Shane McAnally, Kacey Musgraves and Josh Osborne	Kacey Musgraves
2027	"Hardwired"	Black Francis, Jesse Frasure, Adam Hood, Miranda Lambert and Stephen Wilson Jr.	Stephen Wilson Jr.
2027	"Phone, Keys, Wallet"	Trannie Anderson, Jon Decious, Kid Harpoon, Summer Overstreet, Dan Pellarin, Dallas Wilson and Lainey Wilson	Lainey Wilson and John Mayer

- ^{^[I]} Each year is linked to the article about the Grammy Awards held that year.
- ^{^[II]} The performing artist is only listed but does not receive the award.

== Songwriters with multiple wins ==
3 wins

- Josh Kear
- Lori McKenna
- Chris Stapleton
- Kacey Musgraves

2 wins

- Brandi Carlile
- Vince Gill
- John Barlow Jarvis
- Robert John "Mutt" Lange
- Hillary Lindsey
- Shane McAnally
- Roger Miller
- Josh Osborne
- Paul Overstreet
- Liz Rose
- Don Schlitz
- Billy Sherrill
- Taylor Swift
- Chris Tompkins
- Shania Twain

== Songwriters with multiple nominations ==
10 nominations

- Shane McAnally

9 nominations

- Miranda Lambert

8 nominations

- Vince Gill

7 nominations

- Ashley Gorley
- Kacey Musgraves

6 nominations

- Lori McKenna
- Josh Osborne
- Chris Stapleton

5 nominations

- Jessie Jo Dillon
- Luke Laird
- Hillary Lindsey
- Maren Morris
- Billy Sherrill
- Taylor Swift

4 nominations

- Bill Anderson
- Mary Chapin Carpenter
- Rodney Crowell
- Tom Douglas
- Kris Kristofferson
- Robert John "Mutt" Lange
- Don Schlitz
- Shania Twain

3 nominations

- Jessi Alexander
- Casey Beathard
- Matraca Berg
- Eric Church
- Jesse Frasure
- Connie Harrington
- Natalie Hemby
- Alan Jackson
- Jamey Johnson
- Josh Kear
- Lee Thomas Miller
- Roger Miller
- K. T. Oslin
- Thomas Rhett
- Liz Rose
- Laura Veltz

2 nominations

- Trannie Anderson
- Gary Baker
- Brandi Carlile
- Robert Lee Castleman
- Collins Obinna Chibueze
- Tyler Childers
- Sean Cook
- Luke Dick
- Larry Gatlin
- Dave Haywood
- Marcus Hummon
- John Barlow Jarvis
- Charles Kelley
- Richard Leigh
- Chips Moman
- Bob Morrison
- Tim Nichols
- Kenny O'Dell
- Paul Overstreet
- Dolly Parton
- Ben Peters
- Mike Reid
- Marty Robbins
- Bobby Russell
- Nevin Sastry
- Hillary Scott
- Chris Tompkins
- Ryan Vojtesak
- Dallas Wilson
- Lainey Wilson
- Norro Wilson
