= I'm Not Gonna Do Anything Without You =

Single by Mark Wills and Jamie O'Neal

from the album Loving Every Minute and Shiver
- B-side: "I Hate Chicago"
- Released: November 12, 2001
- Genre: Country
- Length: 4:27
- Label: Mercury Nashville
- Songwriters: Rich Alves; Randy VanWarmer
- Producers: Keith Stegall; Carson Chamberlain

Mark Wills singles chronology
| "Loving Every Minute" (2001) | "I'm Not Gonna Do Anything Without You" (2001) | "19 Somethin'" (2002) |

Jamie O'Neal singles chronology
| "Shiver" (2001) | "I'm Not Gonna Do Anything Without You" (2001) | "Frantic" (2002) |

"I'm Not Gonna Do Anything Without You" is a song by American country music artist Mark Wills, recorded as a duet with Australian country music artist Jamie O'Neal. The song was written by Rich Alves and Randy VanWarmer and produced by Keith Stegall and Carson Chamberlain. It was released on November 12, 2001, as the second and final single from Wills' fourth studio album Loving Every Minute (2001) and the fourth single from O'Neal's debut studio album Shiver (2000) by Mercury Nashville, under whom both of them were signed to at the time.

It reached number 31 on the US country singles chart.

== Critical reception ==
Deborah Evans Price of Billboard gave the song a positive review, saying, "This lovely number starts off understated and builds to a gentle emotional crescendo that is effective, not overwrought. Penned by Randy VanWarmer and Rich Alves, the song is a winner, and Wills' and O'Neal's voices blend beautifully."

== Commercial performance ==
"I'm Not Gonna Do Anything Without You" debuted on the US Billboard Hot Country Songs chart the week of December 1, 2001 at number 54 while O'Neal's previous single "Shiver" was still climbing up the charts. It reached a peak position of number 31 on the chart the week of February 16, 2002; it spent 20 weeks in total on the chart. It became O'Neal's fourth top-forty hit and Wills' 12th. It performed slightly better on the Radio & Records Country Top 50, peaking at number 28.

== Charts ==
Weekly chart performance for "I'm Not Gonna Do Anything Without You"
| Chart (2001–2002) | Peak position |
|---|---|
| US Hot Country Songs (Billboard) | 31 |

== Personnel ==
Taken from the Shiver booklet.

- Jamie O'Neal – vocals
- Mark Wills – vocals
- Brent Mason – electric guitars
- Eddie Bayers – drums
- Glenn Worf – bass
- B. James Lowery – acoustic guitar
- Eric Darken – percussion
- Brady Barnett – keyboards
- Paul Franklin – steel guitar
- John Kelton – drum programming
- Rick Alves – writing
- Randy VanWarmer – writing
- Keith Stegall – production, keyboards
- Carson Chamberlain – production
