= Shiver (Jamie O'Neal album) =

2000 studio album by Jamie O'Neal

Studio album by Jamie O'Neal
- Released: 31 October 2000
- Recorded: 2000
- Studio: Sound Station (Nashville, Tennessee); Javelina (Nashville, Tennessee); Sound Stage (Nashville, Tennessee); Wedgewood (Nashville, Tennessee); Compass Point (Nassau, Bahamas); Manta Sound (Toronto, Canada)
- Genre: Country
- Length: 50:25
- Label: Mercury Nashville
- Producer: Keith Stegall; Carson Chamberlain

Jamie O'Neal chronology
Shiver (2000)	Brave (2005)

Singles from Shiver
- 1. "There Is No Arizona" Released: 31 July 2000; 2. "When I Think About Angels" Released: 12 March 2001; 3. "Shiver" Released: 13 August 2001; 4. "I'm Not Gonna Do Anything Without You" Released: 12 November 2001; 5. "Frantic" Released: 11 March 2002

Professional ratings
Review scores
Source	Rating
Allmusic	link

Shiver is the debut studio album by Australian country music artist Jamie O'Neal, released on 31 October 2000 via Mercury Nashville. After signing with the label in early 2000, she began working on the project. Keith Stegall produced the entirety of the album, with the exception of "I'm Not Gonna Do Anything Without You", which was produced by Stegall and Carson Chamberlain. O'Neal co-wrote 11 of the 13 tracks on the album.

The album was positively reviewed by music critics. It reached a peak position of number 14 on the US Top Country Albums, number two on the Heatseekers Albums, and 125 on the Billboard 200. It is her most successful album to date, being certified Gold by the RIAA for sales of 500,000 copies in the United States.

Five singles in total were released. Its lead single, "There Is No Arizona", was a huge hit and made O'Neal the first female Australian to top the US Hot Country Songs chart; its follow-up, "When I Think About Angels", also went number one, making her the first female singer to have her first two singles go number one since Deana Carter did so in 1996 and 1997 with "Strawberry Wine" and "We Danced Anyway". The title track was less successful, peaking at number 21. "I'm Not Gonna Do Anything Without You", a duet with then-Mercury label mate Mark Wills, peaked at number 31; the song was also included on Wills's fourth studio album Loving Every Minute (2001). The final single, "Frantic", peaked outside the top forty.

Following the release of this album, O'Neal recorded her second studio album titled On My Way to You, which was intended for release on October 7, 2003. Although its lead single, "Every Little Thing", peaked at number 34, the album was scrapped and O'Neal went on to leave Mercury by August 2003. She would go on to sign a deal with Capitol Records Nashville to release her second studio album Brave (2005).

== Critical reception ==
Rick Cohoon of Allmusic rated the album four stars out of five, praising O'Neal's voice and the first two singles, but said that the rest of the album "lacks the polish of the pros".

== Track listing ==
All songs produced by Keith Stegall except where noted

Standard version
No.	Title	Writer(s)	Producer(s)	Length
1.	"When I Think About Angels"	Jamie O'Neal; Roxie Dean; Sonny Tillis		3:03
2.	"There Is No Arizona"	O'Neal; Lisa Drew; Shaye Smith		3:57
3.	"Where We Belong"	O'Neal; Annie Roboff; Tim Nichols		3:44
4.	"No More Protecting My Heart"	Nichols; Roboff		3:49
5.	"She Hasn't Heard It Yet"	O'Neal; Christi Dannemiller		3:46
6.	"You Rescued Me"	O'Neal; Dean; Tillis		4:34
7.	"Shiver"	Drew; O'Neal; Smith		4:08
8.	"The Only Thing Wrong"	Gary Harrison; Richard Marx		4:11
9.	"I'm Still Waiting"	Drew; O'Neal; Smith		3:40
10.	"I'm Not Gonna Do Anything Without You" (with Mark Wills)	Rich Alves; Randy VanWarmer	Keith Stegall; Carson Chamberlain	4:27
11.	"Sanctuary"	O'Neal; Darryl Burgess		3:47
12.	"Frantic"	O'Neal; Drew; Smith		2:59
13.	"To Be with You"	Keith Stegall; Dan Hill		4:20
Total length:				50:25

UK special edition
No.	Title	Writer(s)	Producer(s)	Length
14.	"All By Myself" (from Bridget Jones's Diary)	Eric Carmen	Stegall	4:35
Total length:				55:00

== Personnel ==
- Brady Barnett – keyboards (tracks 3, 4, 10, 13), Hammond organ (track 4), vibraphone (track 4), drum loops (tracks 2, 7, 10)
- Eddie Bayers – drums (tracks 2–4, 5, 7, 8, 10, 11, 13)
- Bekka Bramlett – background vocals (tracks 1, 4)
- Eric Darken – percussion (all tracks except 2 & 11)
- Roxie Dean – background vocals (tracks 6, 11)
- Mark Douthit – saxophone (track 4)
- Dan Dugmore – steel guitar (track 5)
- Stuart Duncan – fiddle (track 12)
- Paul Franklin – steel guitar (tracks 3, 10)
- Rodney Good – background vocals (tracks 1, 4–9, 11)
- Owen Hale – drums (tracks 1, 6, 9, 12)
- Aubrey Haynie – fiddle (tracks 7, 9), mandolin (tracks 1, 5, 6, 8, 12)
- Dan Hill – background vocals (track 13)
- John Hobbs – keyboards (track 7), piano (tracks 5, 7, 8)
- Jim Hoke – harmonica (track 2)
- Mike Johnson – steel guitar (track 7)
- John Kelton – bass guitar (tracks 2, 11), keyboards (track 3), drum loops (track 2)
- B. James Lowry – acoustic guitar (tracks 1, 3, 4, 6, 7, 10, 13), gut string guitar (track 9)
- Randy McCormick – Hammond organ (tracks 1, 6, 11)
- Brent Mason – electric guitar (all tracks except 13), gut string guitar (track 13)
- Samantha Murphy – background vocals (tracks 5, 7–9, 11)
- Jamie O'Neal – lead vocals (all tracks), background vocals (tracks 1, 2, 4–9, 11, 12)
- Kim Parent – background vocals (track 12)
- Gary Prim – Hammond organ (track 8), piano (tracks 3, 6, 9, 11)
- Michael Rhodes – bass guitar (tracks 5, 7, 8)
- Michael Rojas – piano (track 2)
- Matt Rollings – piano (tracks 4, 12)
- Keith Stegall – acoustic guitar (track 11), electric guitar (track 11), Hammond organ (track 5), synthesizer (tracks 4, 6), keyboards (track 10, 13), drum loops (track 2)
- Biff Watson – acoustic guitar (track 12)
- John D. Willis – mandolin (track 2)
- Mark Wills – duet vocals (track 10)
- Glenn Worf – bass guitar (tracks 1, 3, 4, 6, 9, 10, 12, 13)
- Jonathan Yudkin – cello (track 2)

Strings on "I'm Still Waiting" and "To Be with You" arranged by Matthew McCauley.

== Charts ==
=== Weekly charts ===
Chart (2000–2001)	Peak position
US Billboard 200	125
US Top Country Albums (Billboard)	14
US Heatseekers Albums (Billboard)	2

=== Year-end charts ===
Chart (2001)	Position
Canadian Country Albums (Nielsen SoundScan)	65
US Top Country Albums (Billboard)	24
Chart (2002)	Position
US Top Country Albums (Billboard)	64

=== Singles ===
Year	Single	Peak chart positions	
Year	Single	US Country	US
2000	"There Is No Arizona"	1	40
2001	"When I Think About Angels"	1	35
2001	"Shiver"	21	—
2002	"I'm Not Gonna Do Anything Without You" (with Mark Wills)	31	—
2002	"Frantic"	41	—

== Certifications ==
Region	Certification
United States (RIAA)	Gold
