= Shiver (Jamie O'Neal song) =

Single by Jamie O'Neal

from the album Shiver
- B-side: "To Be With You"
- Released: August 13, 2001
- Genre: Country
- Length: 4:08
- Label: Mercury Nashville
- Songwriter(s): Jamie O'Neal; Lisa Drew; Shaye Smith
- Producer(s): Keith Stegall

Jamie O'Neal singles chronology
"When I Think About Angels" (2001)	"Shiver" (2001)	"I'm Not Gonna Do Anything Without You" (2001)

"Shiver" is a song recorded by Australian country music artist Jamie O'Neal, recorded as the title track to her debut studio album Shiver (2000). O'Neal wrote the single with Lisa Drew and Shaye Smith, with Keith Stegall producing the track. It was released on August 13, 2001, as the third single from the album. She spoke to the Lakeland Ledger that the track was her favorite song. It is a ballad about "that dizzying tingle you get in the presence of someone you love."

The song peaked at number 21 on the US Hot Country Songs chart.

== Critical reception ==
Deborah Evans Price of Billboard gave the song a positive review by saying, "O'Neal turns in a sultry performance that resonates with warmth and passion, while [Keith] Stegall's production wisely places the focus on O'Neal's self-assured vocals."

== Music video ==
Thom Oliphant directed the video for "Shiver". It was filmed around October 2001 in Vancouver, British Columbia, where O'Neal was on a glacier. It debuted to CMT on October 14, 2001.

== Commercial performance ==
"Shiver" debuted on the US Billboard Hot Country Songs chart the week of September 8, 2001, at number 48, becoming the highest debut of the week. The following week, it rose to number 43. On the final week of 2001 (December 29), it reached number 21 on the chart while O'Neal's duet with Mark Wills, "I'm Not Gonna Do Anything Without You" was rising. It spent 20 weeks in total on the chart.

On the Radio & Records Country Top 50, it debuted at number 40 the week of September 7, 2001. It reached a peak position of number 19 on December 21, 2001. It spent 17 weeks in total, its last charting week was on January 11, 2002, at number 29.

== Track listing ==
7" single
No.	Title	Writer(s)	Length
1.	"Shiver"	Jamie O'Neal; Lisa Drew; Shaye Smith	4:08
2.	"To Be With You"	Keith Stegall; Dan Hill	4:20

== Charts ==
Weekly chart performance for "Shiver"
Chart (2001)	Peak position
US Hot Country Songs (Billboard)	21

=== Year-end charts ===
Year-end chart performance for "Shiver"
Chart (2002)	Position
US Country Songs (Billboard)	98
