= Trying to Find Atlantis =

Single by Jamie O'Neal

from the album Brave
- Released: September 27, 2004
- Genre: Country
- Length: 3:28
- Label: Capitol Nashville
- Songwriters: Chris Waters, Zack Turner
- Producer: Keith Stegall

Jamie O'Neal singles chronology
"Every Little Thing" (2003)	"Trying to Find Atlantis" (2004)	"Somebody's Hero" (2005)

"Trying to Find Atlantis" is a song recorded by Australian country music artist Jamie O'Neal for her second studio album Brave (2005). It was written by Chris Waters and Zack Turner, and produced by Keith Stegall, who had also produced her first album Shiver (2000). The song was released on September 27, 2004, as the lead single from Brave; it was her first single through Capitol Records Nashville.

The single peaked at number 18 on the US Hot Country Songs chart.

== Background ==
"Trying to Find Atlantis" is an up-tempo country song. The song was one of two songs on her second album that were not written or co-written by O'Neal herself. The song was the first single release for O'Neal on Capitol Records after leaving Mercury Records in late 2003. Singers Carolyn Dawn Johnson and Bekka Bramlett joined O'Neal on backing vocals.

== Music video ==
A music video for "Trying to Find Atlantis" was filmed after its release. The video shows O'Neal coming out of the beach, wearing a gold-colored wedding dress. She searches around the area looking for the perfect man for her, but is initially unsuccessful. At the end of the video, she is seen back at the beach and finds a man on a surfboard, realizing he is the perfect man for her. The video debuted to both CMT and GAC for the week of November 7, 2004.

== Chart performance ==
"Trying to Find Atlantis" debuted at number 60 on the US Billboard Hot Country Songs the week of October 9, 2004. The song peaked at number 18 on the chart during the week of March 19, 2005.

== Charts ==
=== Weekly charts ===
Chart (2004–2005)	Peak position
US Country Top 50 (Radio & Records)	15
US Hot Country Songs (Billboard)	18
US Billboard Hot 100	86

=== Year end charts ===
Chart (2005)	Position
US Country (Radio & Records)	74

== Release history ==
Release dates and format(s) for "Trying to Find Atlantis"
Region	Date	Format(s)	Label(s)	Ref.
United States	September 27, 2004	Country radio	Capitol Nashville	
