= Every Little Thing (Jamie O'Neal song) =

Single by Jamie O'Neal

from the album On My Way to You
- B-side: "Trying to Find Atlantis"
- Released: May 12, 2003
- Genre: Country
- Length: 2:52
- Label: Mercury Nashville
- Songwriters: Jamie O'Neal; Roxie Dean; Sonny Tillis
- Producer: Keith Stegall

Jamie O'Neal singles chronology
"Frantic" (2002)	"Every Little Thing" (2003)	"Trying to Find Atlantis" (2004)

"Every Little Thing" is a song by Australian country music artist Jamie O'Neal. It was written by O'Neal, Roxie Dean, and Sonny Tillis and produced by Keith Stegall. It was released on May 12, 2003, as the lead single for what was supposed to be her second studio album, On My Way to You (2003), which was intended to be released on October 7, 2003. The album was later scrapped and O'Neal would go on to leave Mercury Nashville by August 2003. A few songs from that album would later be included on her released second studio album, Brave (2005).

It was not a success, peaking at number 34 on the US Hot Country Songs chart. No video was made for the single.

== Commercial performance ==
"Every Little Thing" debuted on the US Billboard Hot Country Songs the week of May 24, 2003 at number 59. It barely rose to number 58 the following week. It entered the top forty for the week of July 19, 2003 at number 38. It reached a peak position of number 34 on August 16, 2003, where it stayed for one week. It stayed for 16 weeks total on the chart.

== Charts ==
Chart (2003)	Peak position
US Hot Country Songs (Billboard)	34

== Release history ==
Release dates and format(s) for "Every Little Thing"
Region	Date	Format(s)	Label(s)	Ref.
United States	May 12, 2003	Country radio	Mercury Nashville	
