= Rachele Lynae =

American singer-songwriter

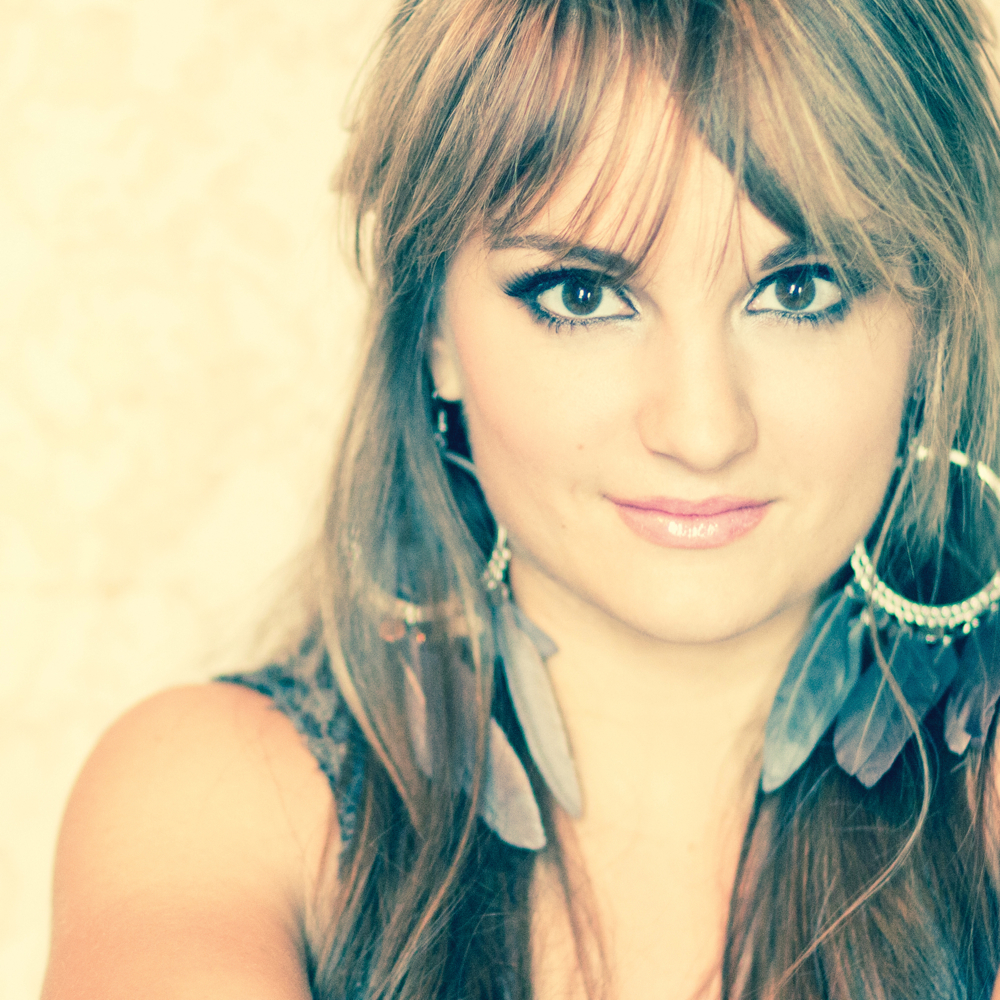
- Rachele Lynae in 2014

Background information
- Birth name: Rachele Lynae Wurm
- Born: January 7, 1988 (age 37); Yuba City, California, US
- Genres: Country rock
- Occupation: Singer
- Years active: 2012–present
- Labels: Momentum Label Group
- Website: www.rachelelynae.com

Rachele Lynae Wurm-Creedon (born January 7, 1988), known professionally as just Rachele Lynae (/rəˈʃɛl lɪˈneɪ/ rə-SHEL lin-AY), is an American country rock singer.

Lynae released her self-titled debut album on April 22, 2014, having released the new single "Touch The Stars" on February 18, 2014.

== Personal life ==
Born Rachele Lynae Wurm in 1988 to Robert Wurm, a commercial fisherman, and Alicia Wurm in Yuba City, California, Lynae was raised in Kodiak, Alaska, and Lynden, Washington, where she attended Lynden Christian Schools. Her sister, Heather Cole, is also a singer. Rachele attended Belmont University.

Lynae began singing in church choir at the age of five. She began writing songs at age 12. Early musical influences include LeAnn Rimes, Reba McEntire and Shania Twain.

Lynae is married to drummer Tim Creedon.

== Career ==
In 2012 Rachele Lynae signed with Momentum Label Group of Nashville, Tennessee. At the end of her senior year at Belmont University, Rachele Lynae recorded a five-song EP. After sharing the EP with now-manager Jimmy Murphy, Lynae was introduced to Jamie O'Neal, Murphy's daughter.

Working with Jamie O'Neal, Stephanie Bentley, and producer Jimmy Murphy, Rachele co-wrote and recorded "Party 'Til the Cows Come Home", a country party anthem. The music video was directed by multi award-winning director Trey Fanjoy.

In 2012, Lynae and Jamie O'Neal released a duet of "Have Yourself a Merry Little Christmas" as a holiday single and video, which was subsequently featured in People Magazine's Country Special Issue's Holiday Playlist. She was also listed in Nashville Lifestyles' Top 20 Musicians to Watch.

Lynae's 2013 single, "Fishin' For Something" was very well received at country radio, and topped the Renegade Radio/Nashville.com Chart in August. Earlier that same year, Lynae was invited to become an honorary "Friends and Family" member of the Country Music Hall of Fame and Museum. "Touch The Stars," released on February 18, 2014, was Lynae's third single release and received airplay at Sirius XM Radio's country channel, The Highway.

Lynae's self-titled debut album, which was released on April 22, 2014, was produced by Jamie O'Neal and included her first three singles: "Party 'Til the Cows Come Home," "Fishin' for Something," and "Touch the Stars."

Lynae has opened for such legendary artists as Wynonna Judd and Leon Russell. She has played at famed Nashville's local bar Tootsie's Orchid Lounge and made five appearances at Nashville's 2012 Country Music Awards events, including one acoustic performance and several autograph signings.

== Discography ==
=== Singles ===
| Year | Title | Producer | Notes |
|---|---|---|---|
| 2012 | "Party 'Til the Cows Come Home" | Jimmy Murphy / Jamie O'Neal | |
| 2012 | "Have Yourself A Merry Little Christmas" | Jamie O'Neal | Duet with Jamie O'Neal |
| 2013 | "Fishin' for Something" | Jamie O'Neal | |
| 2014 | "Touch The Stars" | Jamie O'Neal | |
| 2015 | "Whole Lotta Nothin'" | | |
| 2015 | "Quicksand" | | |

=== Albums ===
| Year | Title | Producer | Released |
|---|---|---|---|
| 2014 | "Rachele Lynae" | Jamie O'Neal | April 22, 2014 |

=== Music videos ===
| Year | Video | Director |
|---|---|---|
| 2012 | "Party 'Til the Cows Come Home" | Trey Fanjoy |
| 2012 | "Have Yourself A Merry Little Christmas" | Noise New Media |
| 2013 | "Out On The Floor" | |
| 2015 | "A Whole Lotta Nothin'" | |
| 2016 | "Quicksand" | Spencer Glover |
