= Roxie Dean =

American singer-songwriter

- Born: March 23, 1964 (age 62)
- Origin: Baton Rouge, Louisiana, United States
- Genres: Country
- Occupation: Singer-songwriter
- Instruments: Vocals, guitar
- Years active: 2001-present
- Labels: DreamWorks Nashville; Valhalla Music Group

Roxie Dean (born March 23, 1964) is an American country music songwriter and singer. In 2005, she released her debut album, Ms. America. Her songwriting career includes a 2001 Nashville Songwriters Association International "Top 10 Songs That You Wish You’d Written" award for "Why They Call It Falling" (co-written with Don Schlitz), and a Grammy nomination for co-writing "When I Think About Angels."

== Early life and career ==
Originally from Baton Rouge, Louisiana, where French was the primary language spoken in her home, Dean recalls her father playing the guitar until she would fall asleep. Before settling in her music career, Dean worked various jobs including retail sales, coordinating events for Toyota in Huntington Beach, California, and farming.

Dean wrote material during her two years at Iowa’s Graceland College on a softball scholarship and while back in Louisiana completing a journalism degree. After graduation she tried unsuccessfully to establish herself in Nashville as a country music artist. She then left for California, where she worked for Toyota. A screening of George Strait's Pure Country motivated her return to Nashville. She began to socialize with a friend from Louisiana who was connected to music industry insiders in the city. This friend, along with Rivers Rutherford (author of Brooks & Dunn's "Ain't Nothing 'bout You", Chely Wright's "Shut Up and Drive" and Montgomery Gentry's "If You Ever Stop Loving Me", among others), helped to find her direction.

== Later career ==
Country music producer Chips Moman offered to let Dean run his farm. While tending the farm, Dean focused on her songwriting and worked with Moman on one of her projects. She co-wrote Jamie O'Neal's number one single "When I Think About Angels", and the singles "Why They Call It Falling" by Lee Ann Womack and "Lonely" by Tracy Lawrence. Dean also worked with producer Harold Shedd and publisher Lionel Conway, then with Maverick Music. After the company went out of business, Ginny Johnson of Hamstein Productions called Dean.

She then began working with producer Buddy Cannon. James Stroud worked with her beginning in 2001, when she signed with DreamWorks Records, over which Stroud presided. Dean left the label in 2003.

Her song "A Soldier's Wife" was released through Valhalla Music Group. A portion of all of the proceeds were donated to the Armed Forces Relief Trust/Operation Helping Hand.

In 2005 Dean released her debut album Ms. America, which included "A Soldier's Wife" and her version of "Why They Call It Falling." She continued her songwriting for other artists; Reba McEntire's Room to Breathe (2003) featured "My Sister" and Sara Evans' Real Fine Place (2005) included "Coalmine", both co-written by Dean.

Roxie Dean signed an exclusive publishing contract with HoriPro Entertainment Group in 2008.

In 2013, Roxie Dean signed an exclusive publishing deal with Judy Harris Music.

== Discography ==
=== Albums ===
Title	Album details
Everyday Girl	Release date: 2003; Label: DreamWorks Records
Ms. America	Release date: February 15, 2005; Label: Valhalla Music
Twenty 14	Release Date: July 22, 2014

=== Singles ===
Year	Single	Peak positions	Album
Year	Single	US Country	Album
2003	"Everyday Girl"	60	—N/a
2004	"Women Know Women"	—	Ms. America
2004	"A Soldier's Wife"	—	Ms. America
"—" denotes releases that did not chart

=== Music videos ===
Year	Video
2003	"Everyday Girl"
