= When I Think About Angels =

Single by Jamie O'Neal

from the album Shiver
- B-side: "The Only Thing Wrong"
- Released: March 12, 2001
- Recorded: 2000
- Studio: Sound Kitchen (Nashville, Tennessee); Javelina (Nashville, Tennessee)
- Genre: Country pop
- Length: 3:03
- Label: Mercury Nashville
- Songwriters: Jamie O'Neal; Roxie Dean; Sonny Tillis
- Producer: Keith Stegall

Jamie O'Neal singles chronology
"There Is No Arizona" (2000)	"When I Think About Angels" (2001)	"Shiver" (2001)

Music video
- "When I Think About Angels" on YouTube

"When I Think About Angels" is a song by Australian country music artist Jamie O'Neal. Penned by O'Neal, Roxie Dean, and Sonny Tillis and produced by Keith Stegall, it was released on March 12, 2001, as the second single from her debut studio album Shiver (2000); it is the opening track to the album.

It was a huge success, becoming her second consecutive number one single on the US Hot Country Songs chart and was one of that year's most successful hits at country radio. It is also one of the few cases where a song topped Billboard's country singles chart but not Radio & Records; the song reached number two on the latter chart. "When I Think About Angels" was nominated at the 44th Annual Grammy Awards in 2002 for Best Country Song.

== Content ==
The narrator confesses that everything reminds her of her significant other.

In the album's booklet, O'Neal dedicated the track to her two dogs, Griffith and the late Dylan. O'Neal wrote the song during a writing session with Roxie Dean and Sonny Tillis, the son of country music legend Mel Tillis.

== Music video ==
Trey Fanjoy directed the music video for "When I Think About Angels" in Los Angeles, California, on a Universal sound stage. It was released to CMT on April 8, 2001.

=== Synopsis ===
Jamie O'Neal in the Trey Fanjoy-directed music video for "When I Think About Angels".

The video begins in a city, where the camera does a full 360 before landing on O'Neal in a cafe sitting at a table with a cup of coffee. A butterfly lands on the cup, and the song begins. During the first chorus, the scene switches to her singing amidst a starry night, then laying on the grass singing accompanied by many butterflies. The next scene shows her singing in a village, then in the same town from the beginning of the video in the pouring rain. These scenes switch back and forth for the remainder of the video, and at the end O'Neal is back in the cafe, possibly having dreamt the whole thing. The butterfly on her coffee cup leaves, and the camera does another 360 back into the city, ending the video, the final shot of the video being an exact upside down image of the opening shot.

== Critical reception ==
Chuck Taylor of Billboard magazine gave the song a positive review saying, "This track shows that O'Neal is a talent who intends to set up shop in Nashville [...] Strong stuff and pure country." Rick Cohoon of AllMusic, in his review for Shiver, called the song along with "There Is No Arizona" as the best tracks from the album.

== Commercial performance ==
"When I Think About Angels" debuted at number 45 on the US Billboard Hot Country Songs chart, then known as Hot Country Singles & Tracks, the week of March 31, 2001, becoming the "Hot Shot Debut" of the week. The following week, the track rose to number 35. The track would rise to the top-ten the week of June 23, 2001, becoming her second top-ten hit. On August 4, 2001, "When I Think About Angels" would reach number one, displacing Montgomery Gentry's single "She Couldn't Change Me". With this, O'Neal became the first female artist to have her first two singles to top the country airplay chart since Deana Carter did so in 1996 and 1997 with "Strawberry Wine" and "We Danced Anyway". It spent one week atop the chart and 29 weeks in total, becoming her third-longest charting single.

The song debuted onto the Radio & Records Country Airplay chart the week of March 23, 2001, becoming the highest debut of the week. It would enter the top ten of the chart the week of June 15, 2001, at number nine. It would reach number two on the chart on August 3, 2001, blocked from the top spot by Blake Shelton's "Austin".It spent 22 weeks on the chart.

"When I Think About Angels" debuted at number 81 on the Billboard Hot 100 on June 9, 2001, peaking at number 35 on August 11, 2001.

== Track listings ==
=== US vinyl single ===
1. "When I Think About Angels"
2. "The Only Thing Wrong"

=== Australasia CD single ===
1. "When I Think About Angels"
2. "There Is No Arizona"

== Personnel ==
Taken from the Shiver booklet.

- Brent Mason – electric guitar
- Owen Hale – drums
- Glenn Worf – bass
- B. James Lowery – acoustic guitar
- Eric Darken – percussion
- Aubrey Haynie – mandolin
- Randy McCormick – Hammond organ
- Rodney Good – background vocalist
- Bekka Bramlett – background vocalist
- Jamie O'Neal – background vocalist

== Charts ==
=== Weekly charts ===
Chart (2001)	Peak position
US Hot Country Songs (Billboard)	1
US Billboard Hot 100	35
US Radio Songs (Billboard)	28
US Country Top 50 (Radio & Records)	2

=== Year-end charts ===
Chart (2001)	Position
US Country Songs (Billboard)	11
US Country (Radio & Records)	12
