= There Is No Arizona =

Single by Jamie O'Neal

from the album Shiver
- B-side: "Frantic"
- Released: July 31, 2000
- Genre: Country
- Length: 3:57
- Label: Mercury Nashville
- Songwriters: Jamie O'Neal; Lisa Drew; Shaye Smith
- Producer: Keith Stegall

Jamie O'Neal singles chronology
"There Is No Arizona" (2000)	"When I Think About Angels" (2001)

"There Is No Arizona" is the debut single by Australian country music artist Jamie O'Neal. O'Neal co-wrote the song with Lisa Drew and Shaye Smith and was produced by Keith Stegall. The song was released on July 31, 2000, as the lead single from her debut studio album Shiver (2000). As included in the song title, the song references the state of Arizona and famous landmarks in the state.

== Content ==
The narrator talks about how a man leaves his partner to settle in Arizona, and promises to send for her (the narrator) when he has things set up. Time goes by and she gets one postcard with no return address but nothing more. Her friends keep asking her when she's going. She tries to hold out hope that he'll come back or send for her. Finally, she realizes that the dream of having a better life with him in Arizona is never going to come true. Some landmarks and places that are referenced include Painted Desert, Sedona, the Grand Canyon, and Tombstone.

== Critical reception ==
Kevin John Coyne of Country Universe rated the song "A", comparing it favorably to Bobbie Gentry and Tanya Tucker while also calling it "a sophisticated blend of pop-country that innovated on traditional country sounds while grounding the material in more adult themes."

== Music video ==
The music video was directed by Lawrence Carroll and premiered in mid-2000. It starts with O'Neal sitting on a bench in a desert with a postcard in her hand singing. She eventually tears up the postcard and the pieces blow away in the wind. Once the second chorus hits, a tarp behind her is revealed, and behind her is a skyscraper (actually the Empire State Building) in New York City. She then is seen walking through NYC (including sitting on another bench, standing in the heart of Times Square, in front of the Flatiron Building, and walking through a small park, all while others are passing her by. As the song ends, she (in Times Square again) simply turns and walks away.

== Chart performance ==
"There Is No Arizona" debuted at number 69 on the U.S. Billboard Hot Country Singles & Tracks for the chart week of August 12, 2000.

Chart (2000–2001)	Peak position
Canada Country Singles (RPM)	52 (Note: "There Is No Arizona" had not yet peaked when RPM ceased publication in November 2000.)
US Hot Country Songs (Billboard)	1
US Billboard Hot 100	40

=== Year-end charts ===
Chart (2001)	Position
US Country Songs (Billboard)	29

== Release history ==
Release dates and format(s) for "There Is No Arizona"
Region	Date	Format(s)	Label(s)	Ref.
United States	July 31, 2000	Country radio	Mercury Nashville	
