= Jamie O'Neal =

Australian singer-songwriter (born 1968)

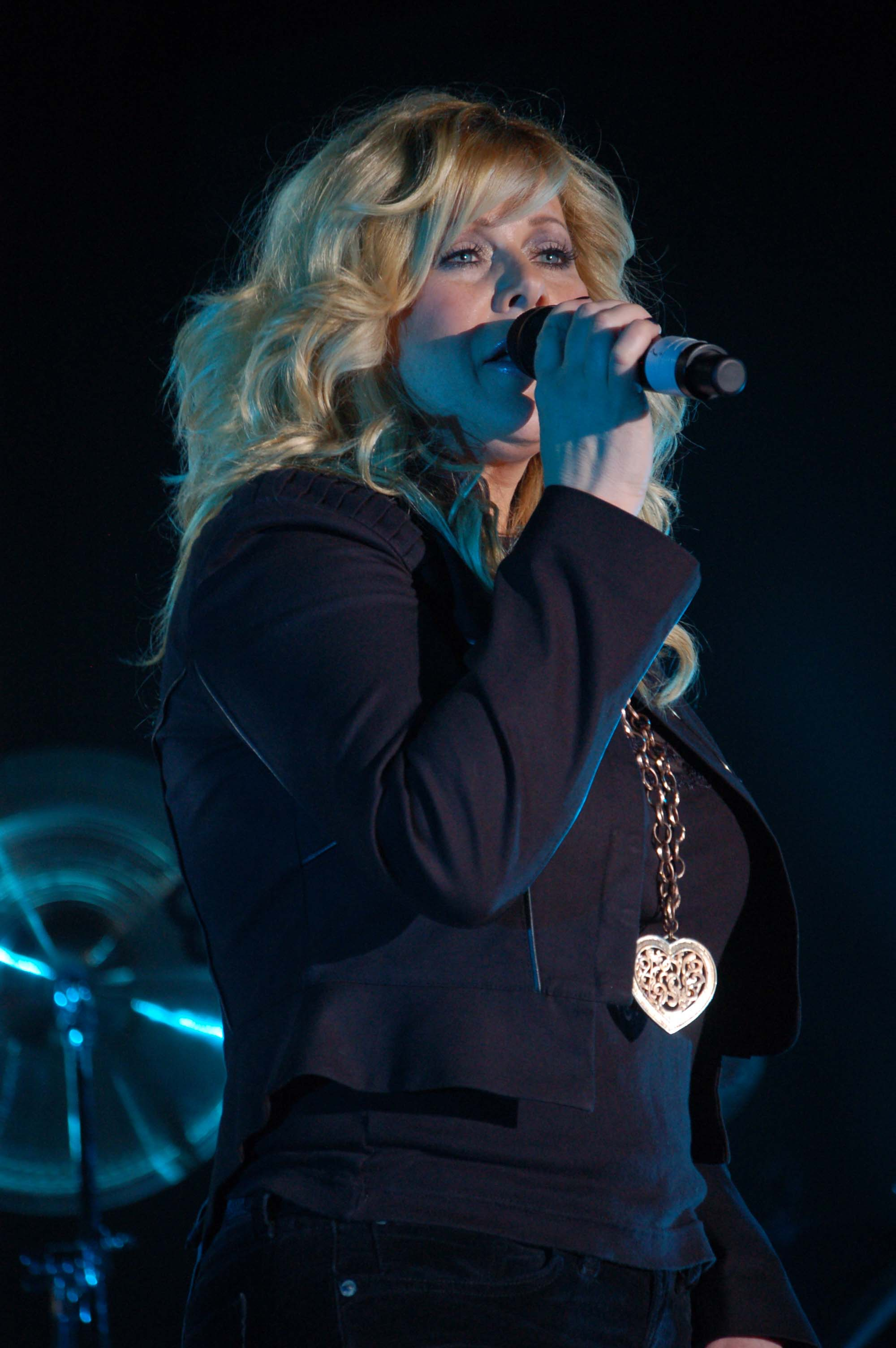
- Jamie O'Neal performing in 2007

Background information
- Born: Jamie Murphy; 3 June 1968 (age 58)
- Origin: Sydney, Australia
- Genres: Country
- Occupation: Singer-songwriter
- Instrument: Vocals
- Years active: 2000–present
- Labels: Mercury Nashville; Capitol Nashville; 1720 Entertainment; Shanachie
- Website: jamieoneal.com

Jamie O'Neal (born 3 June 1968) is an Australian-American country music singer and songwriter.

In 2000, O'Neal released her first studio album, Shiver. The album included the back-to-back number one singles "There Is No Arizona" and "When I Think About Angels". Two other singles were released: the title track, which reached No. 21 on the country charts, and "Frantic", which reached No. 41 in 2002. She released her second studio album, Brave, in 2005 with singles "Trying to Find Atlantis" which reached number 17 and "Somebody's Hero" which reached number 3. O’Neal’s third studio album, Eternal, was released on 27 May 2014.

== Early life ==
O'Neal was born Jamie Murphy in Sydney, to parents Jimmy and Julie Murphy, who were also professional musicians. She, her parents, and her younger sister, Samantha, sang in The Murphy Family band in the 1970s until her parents divorced. In the early part of her adult career she was a backing singer in Australia, appearing on Kylie Minogue's Enjoy Yourself Tour of Australia, UK, Europe and Far East Asia in 1990. She rejoined Minogue in 1991 for the Let's Get To It Tour of the UK and Ireland.

== Music career ==
=== 2000–2003: Shiver and Brave ===
O'Neal was signed to Mercury Nashville in 2000, and soon began to work on her first album. Her first single, "There Is No Arizona", debuted at No. 69 on the Billboard Hot Country Singles & Tracks (now Hot Country Songs) chart, reaching number one in February 2001. On 31 October 2000, Shiver, was released. The album charted to No. 14 on the Billboard Top Country Albums chart, and No. 125 on the Billboard 200.

A second single, "When I Think About Angels", debuted at No. 45 on the country charts for the week of 31 March 2001. It spent several weeks on the charts, reaching number one in August 2001. Following the success of the album's first two singles, Shiver was certified Gold by the Recording Industry Association of America. Two additional singles followed: "Shiver" (the title track) and "Frantic", which reached No. 21 and No. 41 on the charts, respectively.

Also in 2001, the motion picture Bridget Jones's Diary featured a cover version of "All by Myself" performed by Jamie O'Neal, showing actress Renée Zellweger singing to it in the famous pajamas scene.

In 2002, O'Neal and the country singer Mark Wills recorded a duet together, titled "I'm Not Gonna Do Anything Without You". It was released as the second single from Wills' album Loving Every Minute. The song only reached No. 31 on the Hot Country Singles & Tracks chart.

O'Neal's fifth single, "Every Little Thing", was the first from what was to be her second studio album, On My Way to You. However, the song only managed to reach No. 34 on the Hot Country Singles & Tracks chart, and the album was never released. Shortly thereafter, O'Neal and Mercury parted ways. O'Neal went on to sign to Capitol Records and released the album Brave.

=== 2004–2007: Brave and "God Don't Make Mistakes" ===
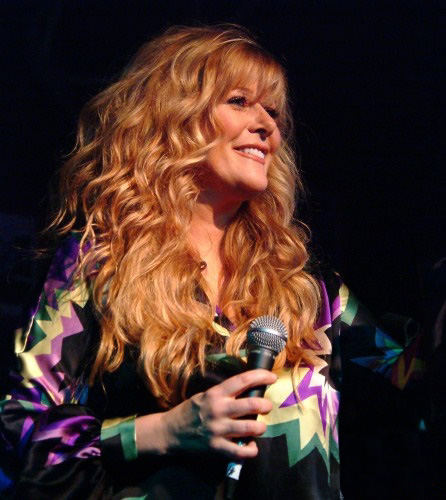
O'Neal at the Maverick Saloon in Santa Ynez, California

After leaving Mercury, O'Neal signed to Capitol Nashville. Her first single for the label, "Trying to Find Atlantis", was released on 27 September 2004. It reached No. 18 on the Hot Country Songs chart. The song was the lead-off to Brave, which was released on 1 March 2005. It proved to be a bigger success on the albums chart, reaching No. 6 on the Top Country Albums chart.

"Somebody's Hero" was released in 2005 as the second single and reached No. 3 on the Hot Country Songs chart, giving O'Neal her first Top 10 single since 2001. The final single, "I Love My Life", failed to make the Top 20, reaching only No. 26.

In early 2007, a new single, "God Don't Make Mistakes", was released. The single failed to make an impact at country radio, where it only reached No. 47, her lowest chart single at the time. After the song was never included on an album, O'Neal and Capitol parted ways.

=== 2008–2010: Like a Woman ===
In early 2008, O'Neal signed with the Atlanta-Nashville based record label 1720 Entertainment.

A new single, "Like a Woman", was released in November 2008; it debuted on the Billboard Hot Country Songs chart at No. 59. The song was initially intended to be the lead-off single to O'Neal's third studio album, Like a Woman. The single only managed to peak at No. 43 on the country charts. A second single, "A Soldier Comin' Home", was released in June 2009 but failed to chart. No further singles were promoted to radio and Like a Woman was not released.

=== 2011–present: starting a record label ===
O'Neal announced in early 2012 that she had established her own record label, Momentum Label Group. The label's flagship artist is Rachele Lynae, who released her first single, "Party 'Til the Cows Come Home", in March 2012.

O'Neal signed to Shanachie Records in 2014 and released Eternal on 27 May 2014. Except for the original song "Wide Awake", the album is composed of cover songs.

O'Neal toured North American in 2017 while recording a new album.

In 2020, she signed to Bob Frank Entertainment/Audium Records and released her fourth studio album, Sometimes, which features duets with Lauren Alaina, Martina McBride, Sara Evans, John Paul White and O'Neal's daughter Aliyah Good.

In 2022, she released her first Christmas album, Spirit & Joy, on Audium Nashville Records.

In 2025, O'Neal released the three-song single All The Same, followed by the five-song EP, Flowers & Fireflies, featuring songs that would appear on her sixth studio album,Gypsum. Released Jan 23, 2026 on BFD/Audium Nashville, O'Neal would co-wrote six of the songs on Gypsum.

== Personal life ==
Since 2000, O'Neal has been married to Rodney Good, who is a songwriter, record producer, engineer, and guitarist in O'Neal's road band. They have one daughter, Aliyah Good, born in 2003.

== Discography ==
Studio albums

- Shiver (2000)
- Every Little Thing (2003)
- Brave (2005)
- Eternal (2014)
- Sometimes (2020)
- Spirit & Joy (2023)
- Gypsum (2026)

== Awards and nominations ==
Year	Organization	Award	Nominee/Work	Result
2001	Academy of Country Music Awards	Top New Female Vocalist	Jamie O'Neal	Won
2001	Academy of Country Music Awards	Single Record of the Year	"There Is No Arizona"	Nominated
2001	Country Music Association Awards	Horizon Award	Jamie O'Neal	Nominated
2001	Country Music Association Awards	Video of the Year	"There Is No Arizona"	Nominated
2002	American Music Awards	Favorite Country New Artist	Jamie O'Neal	Nominated
2002	Grammy Awards	Best Female Country Vocal Performance	"There Is No Arizona"	Nominated
2002	Grammy Awards	Best Country Song	"There Is No Arizona"	Nominated
2002	Grammy Awards	Best Country Song	"When I Think About Angels"	Nominated
