= 2005 in country music =

This is a list of notable events in country music that took place in the year 2005.

== Events ==
- January 1 – Earl Scruggs celebrates his 50th Grand Ole Opry anniversary
- February 26 – Charlie Louvin of The Louvin Brothers celebrates his 50th Grand Ole Opry Anniversary
- April 30 – Billboard magazine renames the Hot Country Singles & Tracks chart "Hot Country Songs." The chart's renaming is part of a major redesign of the 110-year-old magazine.
- May 25 – Oklahoma-born Carrie Underwood becomes the fourth-season winner of American Idol. Although her first single, "Inside Your Heaven," tops the Billboard Hot 100 chart, the 22-year-old Underwood's influences and music are predominantly country. Late in the year, she entered the top 10 of the Billboard Hot Country Songs chart for the first time with "Jesus, Take the Wheel". Her debut album, Some Hearts, rockets to No. 1 on the album charts.
- May 25 – Garth Brooks proposes to longtime girlfriend and fellow country music star Trisha Yearwood in Bakersfield, California, ending long-standing speculation about their relationship.
- May 27 – Gretchen Wilson guest Miranda Lambert at the Schottenstein Center in Columbus, Ohio.
- September – Country music acts participate in benefit concerts to aid victims of Hurricane Katrina. On September 9, Dixie Chicks, Garth Brooks and Trisha Yearwood are among the artists participating in "Shelter from the Storm: A Concert for the Gulf Coast", which airs live on cable and broadcast television stations in the United States and worldwide.

"ReAct Now: Music & Relief" is held September 10. Country performers at the 4½-hour concert — which airs live on CMT – include Alan Jackson and Gretchen Wilson.

- October – Koch Records Nashville folds when its parent company goes out of business.
- October 29 – Slim Whitman celebrates his 50th Grand Ole Opry Anniversary
- November 9 – After 27 years as host of American Country Countdown, radio personality Bob Kingsley steps down, after his production company and ABC Radio Networks (which distributes the show) fail to come to terms in renegotiating a distribution agreement. Kix Brooks, one half of the superstar duo Brooks & Dunn, is named the new host and was slated to take over January 21, 2006. Kingsley's last shows with "ACC" are the December 24 countdown program and "Christmas in America".
- November 14 – Country music superstars Trisha Yearwood, Martina McBride, Barbara Mandrell, Carrie Underwood and Jo Dee Messina at the CNN's Larry King Live.
- November 15 – Gretchen Wilson and Kenny Chesney at the 2005 CMA Awards.
- November 18 – The Johnny Cash biopic, Walk the Line, opens nationwide. The movie stars Joaquin Phoenix as "The Man in Black" and Reese Witherspoon as his girlfriend (and wife-to-be) June Carter. The movie is widely praised by critics and a major box office hit, culminating in Reese winning the Best Actress Oscar the following year.
- November 21 – Jean Shepard Celebrates her 50th Grand Ole Opry Anniversary
- November 25 – Garth Brooks releases The Limited Series, his second box set to be sold exclusively at Wal-Mart and Sam's Club stores. The set contains his previous two studio albums, Sevens and Scarecrow; plus his Double Live album; The Lost Sessions, a new album of previously unreleased material; and an All Access DVD containing behind-the-scenes footage of his concerts. The Limited Series is Brooks' first box set to be released under his label, Pearl Records; he had left his longtime label, Capitol Records, earlier in the year.
- December 9 – Garth Brooks and Carrie Underwood are tough acts to follow.
- December 10 – Garth Brooks and Trisha Yearwood marry at their home in Oklahoma. It is Brooks' second marriage, Yearwood's third.
- December 31 – Bob Kingsley's new countdown program, "Bob Kingsley's Country Top 40", premieres with the annual year-end countdown. The new four-hour show, which aired on many of the same stations that aired "ACC", is distributed by the Jones Radio Network.

=== No dates ===
- Mindy McCready endures a rough year, with stories about her personal and legal problems making headlines. They include violent run-ins with her ex-boyfriend, Billy McKnight; various crimes she had been charged with (including fraud, prescription drug crimes, driving under the influence and probation violation) and at least two suicide attempts. Late in the year, Mindy spoke about her problems on The Oprah Winfrey Show and Larry King Live.
- Toby Keith, the flagship artist for DreamWorks Nashville, departs to form his own label, Show Dog Nashville. DreamWorks – which had never really lived up to its expectations – is shut down shortly thereafter by its parent company, Universal Music Group.
- Kellie Pickler and Aaron Tippin in a state in Carolina.
- The Country Music Association announces a new TV deal to move the CMA Awards to ABC, after years of being broadcast on CBS.
- Tammy Genovese becomes the head of the Country Music Association, succeeding Ed Benson.
- Country music icon George Jones marks his 50th year in country music.

== Top hits of the year ==
The following songs placed within the Top 20 on the Hot Country Songs or Canada Country charts in 2005:

| US | CAN | Single | Artist |
|---|---|---|---|
| 4 | 6 | Alcohol | Brad Paisley |
| 8 | 2 | All Jacked Up | Gretchen Wilson |
| 1 | 2 | Anything but Mine | Kenny Chesney |
| 16 | — | Arlington | Trace Adkins |
| 1 | 2 | As Good as I Once Was | Toby Keith |
| 1 | 8 | Awful, Beautiful Life | Darryl Worley |
| 2 | 1 | Baby Girl | Sugarland |
| 7 | 13 | Best I Ever Had | Gary Allan |
| 1 | 1 | Better Life | Keith Urban |
| 5 | 1 | Big Blue Note | Toby Keith |
| 20 | 19 | Big Time | Big & Rich |
| 10 | 11 | Billy's Got His Beer Goggles On | Neal McCoy |
| 1 | 1 | Bless the Broken Road | Rascal Flatts |
| 16 | 28 | Class Reunion (That Used to Be Us) | Lonestar |
| 1 | 3 | Come a Little Closer | Dierks Bentley |
| 5 | 3 | Do You Want Fries with That | Tim McGraw |
| 24 | 4 | Don't! | Shania Twain |
| 16 | — | Don't Ask Me How I Know | Bobby Pinson |
| 7 | 13 | Don't Worry 'bout a Thing | SHeDAISY |
| 14 | 6 | Drugs or Jesus | Tim McGraw |
| 1 | 2 | Fast Cars and Freedom | Rascal Flatts |
| 15 | 22 | Georgia Rain | Trisha Yearwood |
| 16 | 19 | God's Will | Martina McBride |
| 3 | 4 | Gone | Montgomery Gentry |
| 3 | 2 | Good Ride Cowboy | Garth Brooks |
| 10 | 18 | Goodbye Time | Blake Shelton |
| 7 | 12 | He Gets That from Me | Reba McEntire |
| 8 | 29 | Help Somebody | Van Zant |
| 10 | 27 | Hicktown | Jason Aldean |
| 15 | 9 | Holy Water | Big & Rich |
| 2 | 2 | Homewrecker | Gretchen Wilson |
| 8 | 6 | Honkytonk U | Toby Keith |
| 4 | 20 | How Am I Doin' | Dierks Bentley |
| 18 | 25 | How Do You Get That Lonely | Blaine Larsen |
| 45 | 8 | I Ain't No Quitter | Shania Twain |
| 10 | 6 | I May Hate Myself in the Morning | Lee Ann Womack |
| 18 | 19 | (I Never Promised You A) Rose Garden | Martina McBride |
| 17 | — | I'll Take That as a Yes (The Hot Tub Song) | Phil Vassar |
| 5 | 23 | If Heaven | Andy Griggs |
| 9 | 26 | If Something Should Happen | Darryl Worley |
| 1 | 4 | It's Getting Better All the Time | Brooks & Dunn |
| 6 | 5 | Keg in the Closet | Kenny Chesney |
| 8 | 14 | Let Them Be Little | Billy Dean |
| 17 | — | Long, Slow Kisses | Jeff Bates |
| 3 | 1 | Lot of Leavin' Left to Do | Dierks Bentley |
| 1 | 1 | Making Memories of Us | Keith Urban |
| 12 | 29 | Miss Me Baby | Chris Cagle |
| 1 | 1 | Mississippi Girl | Faith Hill |
| 5 | 4 | Monday Morning Church | Alan Jackson |
| 1 | 1 | Mud on the Tires | Brad Paisley |
| 1 | 4 | Must Be Doin' Somethin' Right | Billy Currington |
| 1 | 1 | My Give a Damn's Busted | Jo Dee Messina |
| 44 | 4 | My Name | George Canyon |
| 16 | 17 | My Sister | Reba McEntire |
| 5 | 1 | Nothin' 'bout Love Makes Sense | LeAnn Rimes |
| 1 | 1 | Nothin' to Lose | Josh Gracin |
| 18 | — | Paper Angels | Jimmy Wayne |
| 8 | 14 | Pickin' Wildflowers | Keith Anderson |
| 1 | 1 | Play Something Country | Brooks & Dunn |
| 3 | 19 | Probably Wouldn't Be This Way | LeAnn Rimes |
| 1 | 1 | A Real Fine Place to Start | Sara Evans |
| 2 | 9 | Redneck Yacht Club | Craig Morgan |
| 25 | 15 | She Didn't Have Time | Terri Clark |
| 2 | 2 | Skin (Sarabeth) | Rascal Flatts |
| 3 | 6 | Somebody's Hero | Jamie O'Neal |
| 2 | 1 | Something More | Sugarland |
| 1 | 5 | Something to Be Proud Of | Montgomery Gentry |
| 2 | 15 | Songs About Me | Trace Adkins |
| 5 | 6 | Stay with Me (Brass Bed) | Josh Gracin |
| 18 | 15 | The Talkin' Song Repair Blues | Alan Jackson |
| 1 | 1 | Tequila Makes Her Clothes Fall Off | Joe Nichols |
| 1 | 3 | That's What I Love About Sunday | Craig Morgan |
| 18 | 24 | Trying to Find Atlantis | Jamie O'Neal |
| 18 | — | USA Today | Alan Jackson |
| 36 | 5 | Waitin' on the Wonderful | Aaron Lines |
| 4 | 11 | What's a Guy Gotta Do | Joe Nichols |
| 4 | 2 | When I Think About Cheatin' | Gretchen Wilson |
| 2 | 1 | Who You'd Be Today | Kenny Chesney |
| 4 | 5 | You'll Be There | George Strait |
| 8 | 7 | You're Like Comin' Home | Lonestar |
| 2 | 1 | You're My Better Half | Keith Urban |

== Top new album releases ==
The following albums placed within the Top 50 on the Top Country Albums charts in 2005:

| US | Album | Artist | Record label |
|---|---|---|---|
| 1 | All Jacked Up | Gretchen Wilson | Epic |
| 4 | Anywhere but Here | Chris Cagle | Capitol Nashville |
| 1 | Be as You Are (Songs from an Old Blue Chair) | Kenny Chesney | BNA |
| 8 | Blame the Vain | Dwight Yoakam | New West |
| 6 | Brave | Jamie O'Neal | Capitol Nashville |
| 3 | Coming Home | Lonestar | BNA |
| 3 | Comin' to Your City | Big & Rich | Warner Bros. |
| 6 | Countryman | Willie Nelson | Lost Highway |
| 1 | Delicious Surprise | Jo Dee Messina | Curb |
| 2 | Doin' Somethin' Right | Billy Currington | Mercury Nashville |
| 5 | Erika Jo | Erika Jo | Universal South |
| 1 | Fireflies | Faith Hill | Warner Bros. |
| 6 | Garage | Cross Canadian Ragweed | Universal South |
| 2 | Get Right with the Man | Van Zant | Columbia |
| 2 | Her Story: Scenes from a Lifetime | Wynonna | Asylum-Curb |
| 1 | Hillbilly Deluxe | Brooks & Dunn | Arista Nashville |
| 1 | Honkytonk University | Toby Keith | DreamWorks Nashville |
| 6 | Hot Apple Pie | Hot Apple Pie | DreamWorks Nashville |
| 2 | III | Joe Nichols | Universal South |
| 6 | Jason Aldean | Jason Aldean | Broken Bow |
| 1 | Jasper County | Trisha Yearwood | MCA Nashville |
| 1 | Kerosene | Miranda Lambert | Epic |
| 2 | The Legend of Johnny Cash | Johnny Cash | Island |
| 8 | Let Them Be Little | Billy Dean | Asylum-Curb |
| 4 | Life Goes On | Terri Clark | Mercury Nashville |
| 2 | Loco Motive | Cowboy Troy | RAYBAW |
| 1 | Modern Day Drifter | Dierks Bentley | Capitol Nashville |
| 7 | My Kind of Livin' | Craig Morgan | Broken Bow |
| 1 | Real Fine Place | Sara Evans | RCA Nashville |
| 3 | Reba #1's | Reba McEntire | MCA Nashville |
| 4 | R.I.D.E. | Trick Pony | Asylum-Curb |
| 1 | The Right to Bare Arms | Larry the Cable Guy | Warner Bros. |
| 1 | The Road and the Radio | Kenny Chesney | BNA |
| 1 | Some Hearts | Carrie Underwood | Arista Nashville |
| 2 | Something to Be Proud Of: The Best of 1999-2005 | Montgomery Gentry | Columbia |
| 1 | Somewhere Down in Texas | George Strait | MCA Nashville |
| 1 | Songs About Me | Trace Adkins | Capitol Nashville |
| 8 | That's Life | Neal McCoy | 903 |
| 8 | Then & Now: The Hits Collection | Tracy Lawrence | Mercury Nashville |
| 3 | There's More Where That Came From | Lee Ann Womack | MCA Nashville |
| 9 | Those Were the Days | Dolly Parton | Blue Eye |
| 2 | This Woman | LeAnn Rimes | Asylum-Curb |
| 1 | Time Well Wasted | Brad Paisley | Arista Nashville |
| 1 | Timeless | Martina McBride | RCA Nashville |
| 5 | Times Like These | Buddy Jewell | Columbia |
| 1 | Totally Country Vol. 4 | Various Artists | Sony BMG |
| 1 | Tough All Over | Gary Allan | MCA Nashville |
| 3 | Walk the Line Soundtrack | Various Artists | Wind-Up |

=== Other top albums ===
| US | Album | Artist | Record label |
|---|---|---|---|
| 42 | 16 Biggest Hits | Waylon Jennings | RCA Nashville |
| 13 | All of Me | Anne Murray | StraightWay |
| 20 | Anthology, Volume 1 | Chris LeDoux | Capitol Nashville |
| 35 | Barely Famous Hits | The Warren Brothers | BNA |
| 47 | Childish Things | James McMurtry | Compadre |
| 14 | Cost of Living | Delbert McClinton | New West |
| 39 | Country's Got Heart | Various Artists | Time Life |
| 13 | Dream Big | Ryan Shupe & the RubberBand | Capitol Nashville |
| 29 | Dreamin' My Dreams | Patty Loveless | Epic |
| 36 | Drinkin' Songs and Other Logic | Clint Black | Equity |
| 39 | Everything and More | Billy Gilman | Image |
| 28 | Glory Train: Songs of Faith, Worship, and Praise | Randy Travis | Word/Curb |
| 43 | Gold | Patsy Cline | MCA Nashville |
| 14 | Greatest Hits | Tracy Byrd | BNA |
| 42 | Hanna-McEuen | Hanna-McEuen | DreamWorks Nashville |
| 13 | Hits I Missed...And One I Didn't | George Jones | Bandit |
| 47 | Hitstory | Elvis Presley | RCA |
| 31 | The Legend | Johnny Cash | Legacy |
| 23 | Man Like Me | Bobby Pinson | RCA Nashville |
| 18 | The Metropolitan Hotel | Chely Wright | Dualtone |
| 47 | Mission Temple Fireworks Stand | Sawyer Brown | Curb |
| 39 | My Kind of Music | Ray Scott | Warner Bros. |
| 40 | Nashville Star 2005 Finalists | Various Artists | Universal South |
| 42 | Nothing Left to Hide | Cory Morrow | Write On |
| 14 | Off to Join the World | Blaine Larsen | BNA |
| 37 | The Outsider | Rodney Crowell | Columbia |
| 22 | Patriotic Country 2 | Various Artists | BMG Heritage |
| 22 | Put the "O" Back in Country | Shooter Jennings | Universal South |
| 31 | Ride | Shelly Fairchild | Columbia |
| 73 | Right Out of Nowhere | Kathy Mattea | Narada |
| 12 | The Road to Here | Little Big Town | Equity |
| 13 | Songs | Willie Nelson | Lost Highway |
| 26 | The Story of My Life | Deana Carter | Vanguard |
| 12 | Three Chord Country and American Rock & Roll | Keith Anderson | Arista Nashville |
| 23 | The Very Best of Emmylou Harris: Heartaches & Highways | Emmylou Harris | Rhino |
| 21 | What I Really Mean | Robert Earl Keen | Koch |

== Deaths ==
- February 6 – Merle Kilgore, 70, prolific songwriter ("Wolverton Mountain," "Ring of Fire") and manager of Hank Williams Jr. (cancer)
- February 12 – Sammi Smith, 61, best known for "Help Me Make it Through the Night."
- February 25 – Goldie Hill, 72, best known for "I Let the Stars Get in My Eyes" and wife of Carl Smith.
- March 2 – Joe Carter, 78, son of A.P. and Sara Carter.
- March 9 – Chris LeDoux, 56, world champion bareback rider who sang about the rodeo circuit and cowboy life.
- May 14 – Jimmy Martin, 77, the "King of Bluegrass."
- June 27 – Robert Byrne, 50, songwriter (unknown causes)
- August 16 – Vassar Clements, 77, legendary fiddle player. (cancer)

== Hall of Fame inductees ==
=== Bluegrass Music Hall of Fame inductees ===
- Red Allen
- Benny Martin

=== Country Music Hall of Fame inductees ===
- Alabama (Randy Owen (born 1949); Teddy Gentry (born 1952); Jeff Cook (1949–2022); and Mark Herndon (born 1955)).
- DeFord Bailey (1899–1982)
- Glen Campbell (1936–2017)

=== Canadian Country Music Hall of Fame inductees ===
- Gary Fjellgaard
- R. Harlan Smith
- Paul Kennedy

== Major awards ==
=== Grammy Awards ===
(presented February 8, 2006 in Los Angeles)

- Best Female Country Vocal Performance – "The Connection", Emmylou Harris
- Best Male Country Vocal Performance – "You'll Think of Me", Keith Urban
- Best Country Performance by a Duo or Group with Vocal – "Restless", Alison Krauss & Union Station
- Best Country Collaboration with Vocals – "Like We Never Loved At All", Faith Hill and Tim McGraw
- Best Country Instrumental Performance – "Unionhouse Branch", Alison Krauss & Union Station
- Best Country Song – "Bless the Broken Road", Bobby Boyd, Jeff Hanna & Marcus Hummon
- Best Country Album – Lonely Runs Both Ways, Alison Krauss & Union Station
- Best Bluegrass Album – The Company We Keep, Del McCoury Band

=== Juno Awards ===
(presented April 2, 2006 in Halifax)

- Country Recording of the Year – The Road Hammers, The Road Hammers

=== CMT Music Awards ===
(presented April 11 in Nashville)

- Video of the Year – "Days Go By", Keith Urban
- Male Video of the Year – "I Go Back", Kenny Chesney
- Female Video of the Year – "When I Think About Cheatin'", Gretchen Wilson
- Group/Duo Video of the Year – "Feels Like Today", Rascal Flatts
- Breakthrough Video of the Year – "Redneck Woman", Gretchen Wilson
- Collaborative Video of the Year – "Whiskey Lullaby", Brad Paisley Featuring Alison Krauss
- Hottest Video of the Year – "Whiskey Girl", Toby Keith
- Most Inspiring Video of the Year – "Live Like You Were Dying", Tim McGraw
- Video Director of the Year – "Whiskey Lullaby", Brad Paisley Featuring Alison Krauss (Director: Rick Schroder)
- Johnny Cash Visionary Award – Loretta Lynn

=== Americana Music Honors & Awards ===
- Album of the Year – Universal United House of Prayer (Buddy Miller)
- Artist of the Year – John Prine
- Song of the Year – "Worry Too Much" (Mark Heard)
- Emerging Artist of the Year – Mary Gauthier
- Instrumentalist of the Year – Sonny Landreth
- Spirit of Americana/Free Speech Award – Judy Collins
- Lifetime Achievement: Songwriting – Guy Clark
- Lifetime Achievement: Performance – Marty Stuart
- Lifetime Achievement: Executive – The Rounder Founders (Ken Irwin, Marian Leighton, Bill Nowlin)

=== Academy of Country Music ===
(presented May 23, 2006 in Las Vegas)

- Entertainer of the Year – Kenny Chesney
- Song of the Year – "Believe", Ronnie Dunn and Craig Wiseman
- Single of the Year – "Jesus, Take the Wheel", Carrie Underwood
- Album of the Year – Time Well Wasted, Brad Paisley
- Top Male Vocalist – Keith Urban
- Top Female Vocalist – Sara Evans
- Top Vocal Duo – Brooks & Dunn
- Top Vocal Group – Rascal Flatts
- Top New Male Vocalist – Jason Aldean
- Top New Female Vocalist – Carrie Underwood
- Top New Duo or Group – Sugarland
- Video of the Year – "When I Get Where I'm Going", Brad Paisley and Dolly Parton (Director: Jim Shea)
- Vocal Event of the Year – "When I Get Where I'm Going", Brad Paisley and Dolly Parton
- ACM/Home Depot Humanitarian of the Year – Vince Gill
- Pioneer Awards – Little Jimmy Dickens, Kris Kristofferson, Bill Monroe and Earl Scruggs

=== ARIA Awards ===
(presented in Sydney on October 23, 2005)

- Best Country Album – Be Here (Keith Urban)
- ARIA Hall of Fame – Smoky Dawson

=== Canadian Country Music Association ===
(presented September 12 in Calgary)

- Kraft Cheez Whiz Fans' Choice Award – George Canyon
- Male Artist of the Year – George Canyon
- Female Artist of the Year – Terri Clark
- Group or Duo of the Year – The Road Hammers
- SOCAN Song of the Year – "My Name", George Canyon, Gordie Sampson
- Single of the Year – "My Name", George Canyon
- Album of the Year – This Time Around, Paul Brandt
- Top Selling Album – Greatest Hits, Shania Twain
- CMT Video of the Year – "Convoy," Paul Brandt
- Chevy Trucks Rising Star Award – Amanda Wilkinson
- Roots Artist or Group of the Year – Corb Lund

=== Country Music Association ===
(presented November 15 in New York City)

- Entertainer of the Year – Keith Urban
- Song of the Year – "Whiskey Lullaby", Bill Anderson and Jon Randall
- Single of the Year – "I May Hate Myself in the Morning", Lee Ann Womack
- Album of the Year – There's More Where That Came From, Lee Ann Womack
- Male Vocalist of the Year – Keith Urban
- Female Vocalist of the Year – Gretchen Wilson
- Vocal Duo of the Year – Brooks & Dunn
- Vocal Group of the Year – Rascal Flatts
- Horizon Award – Dierks Bentley
- Video of the Year – "As Good As I Once Was", Toby Keith (Director: Michael Salomon)
- Vocal Event of the Year – "Good News, Bad News", George Strait and Lee Ann Womack
- Musician of the Year – Jerry Douglas

== Other links ==
- Country Music Association
- Inductees of the Country Music Hall of Fame
- 2005 in Swiss music
