= List of number-one country singles of 2005 (Canada) =

Canada Country was a chart that was published weekly by Radio & Records magazine. The chart was published from January 7, 2005, to December 23, 2005, for the year. This 30-position chart listed the most popular country music songs, calculated weekly by airplay from 21 Canadian stations as monitored by Mediabase Research. Like most music charts, the Canada Country Top 30 had a rule when songs entered recurrent rotation. A song entered recurrent if it had been on the chart for 20 weeks or more and is ranked below number 15. This was the country music chart Canada had before Billboard magazine started their version of Canada Country in July 2006.

These are the Canadian number-one country songs of 2005, per the R&R Canada Country Top 30. No issue was published the week of December 30.

== Number ones ==
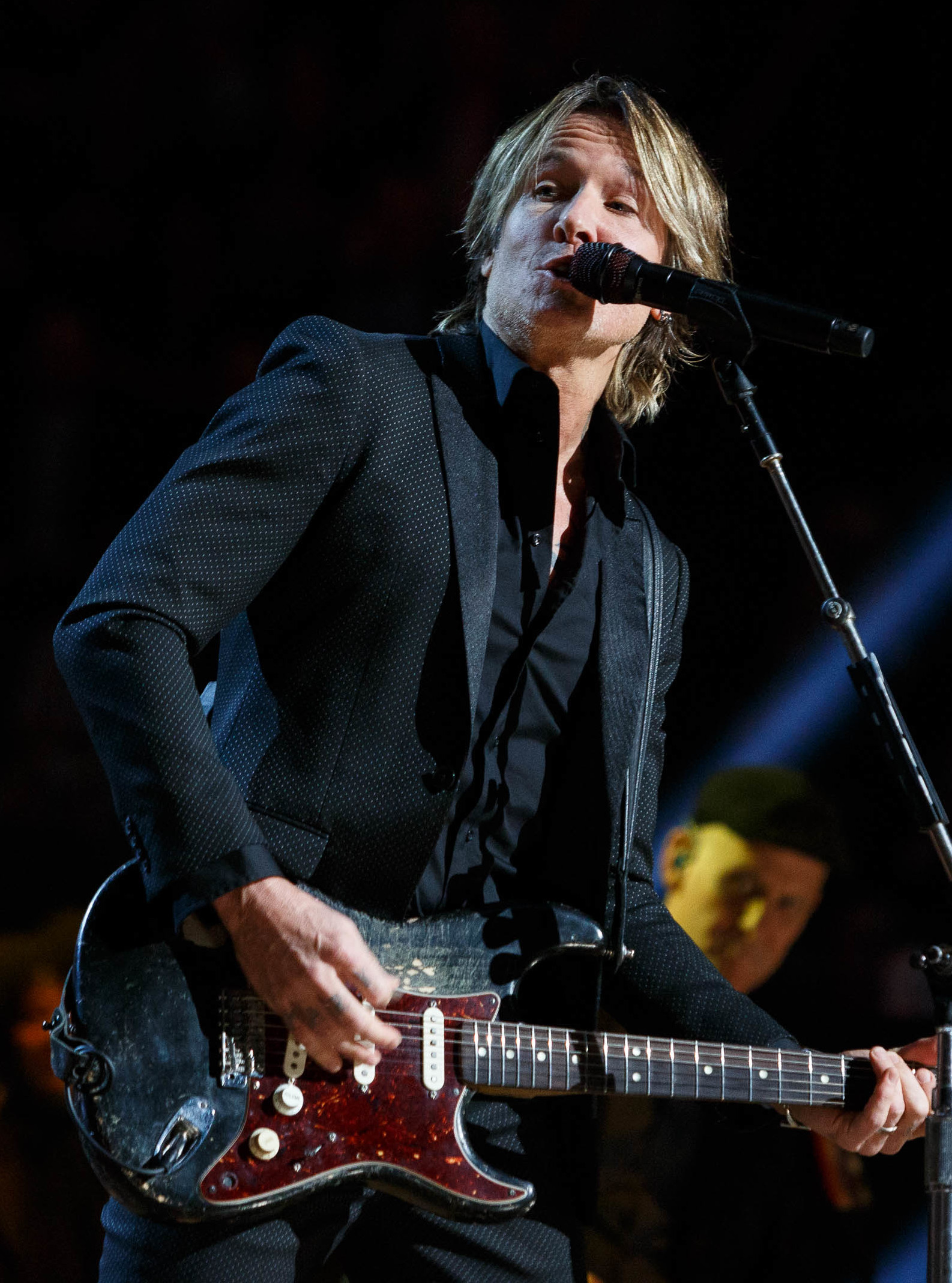
Keith Urban had the longest running number one hit of 2005, spending eight non-consecutive weeks atop with "Better Life".

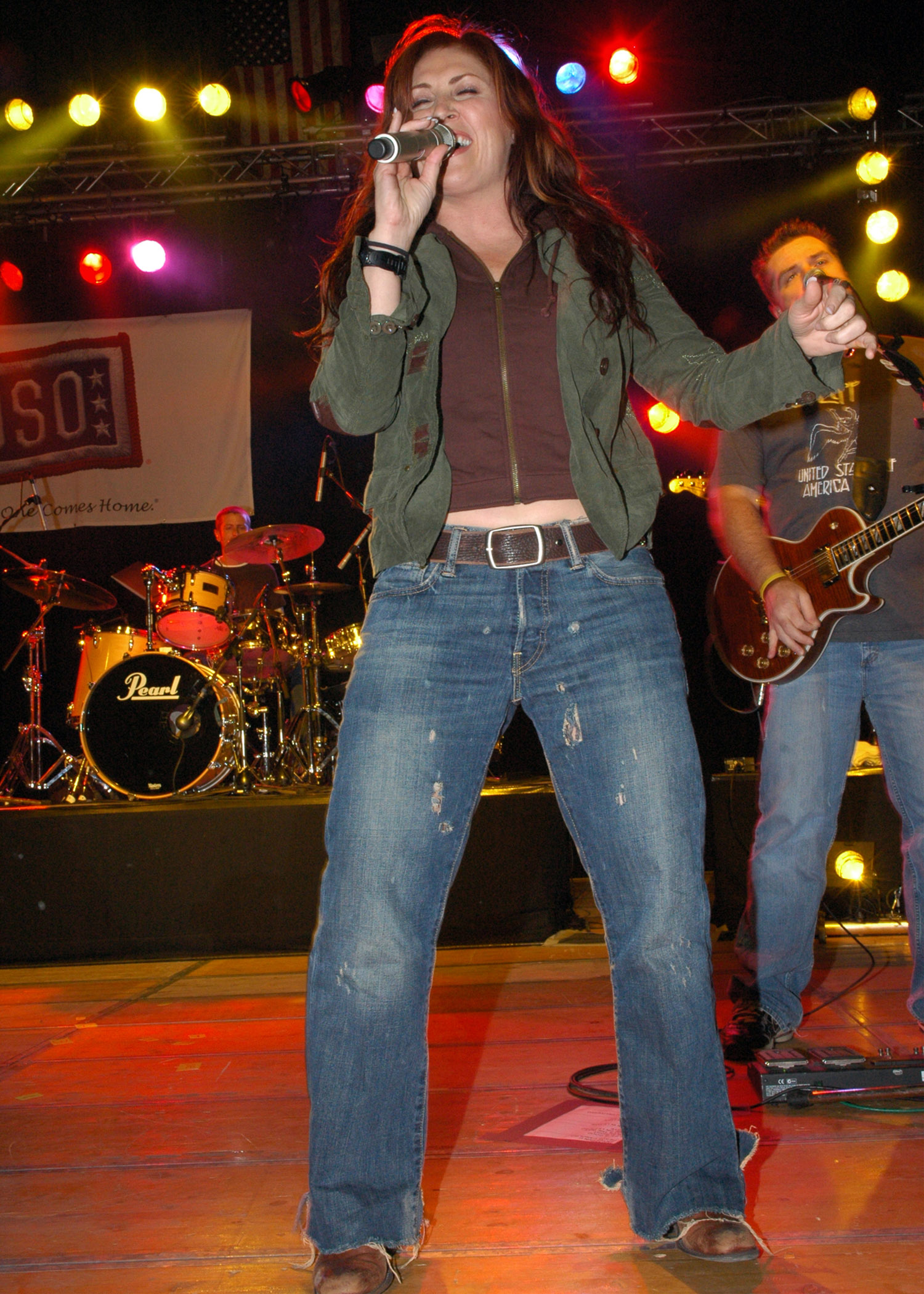
Jo Dee Messina had the number-one year end song with "My Give a Damn's Busted".

| Issue date | Song | Artist | Ref. |
|---|---|---|---|
| January 7 | "Back When" | Tim McGraw | |
| January 14 | "Mud on the Tires" | Brad Paisley | |
| January 21 | "Mud on the Tires" | Brad Paisley | |
| January 28 | "You're My Better Half" | Keith Urban | |
| February 4 | "Mud on the Tires" | Brad Paisley | |
| February 11 | "Mud on the Tires" | Brad Paisley | |
| February 18 | "Bless the Broken Road" | Rascal Flatts | |
| February 25 | "Bless the Broken Road" | Rascal Flatts | |
| March 4 | "Bless the Broken Road" | Rascal Flatts | |
| March 11 | "Bless the Broken Road" | Rascal Flatts | |
| March 18 | "Nothin' to Lose" | Josh Gracin | |
| March 25 | "Baby Girl" | Sugarland | |
| April 1 | "Baby Girl" | Sugarland | |
| April 8 | "Baby Girl" | Sugarland | |
| April 15 | "My Give a Damn's Busted" | Jo Dee Messina | |
| April 22 | "My Give a Damn's Busted" | Jo Dee Messina | |
| April 29 | "My Give a Damn's Busted" | Jo Dee Messina | |
| May 6 | "My Give a Damn's Busted" | Jo Dee Messina | |
| May 13 | "My Give a Damn's Busted" | Jo Dee Messina | |
| May 20 | "Lot of Leavin' Left to Do" | Dierks Bentley | |
| May 27 | "Lot of Leavin' Left to Do" | Dierks Bentley | |
| June 3 | "Lot of Leavin' Left to Do" | Dierks Bentley | |
| June 10 | "Lot of Leavin' Left to Do" | Dierks Bentley | |
| June 17 | "Making Memories of Us" | Keith Urban | |
| June 24 | "Making Memories of Us" | Keith Urban | |
| July 1 | "Making Memories of Us" | Keith Urban | |
| July 8 | "Something More" | Sugarland | |
| July 15 | "Something More" | Sugarland | |
| July 22 | "Something More" | Sugarland | |
| July 29 | "Something More" | Sugarland | |
| August 5 | "Mississippi Girl" | Faith Hill | |
| August 12 | "Mississippi Girl" | Faith Hill | |
| August 19 | "Mississippi Girl" | Faith Hill | |
| August 26 | "Play Something Country" | Brooks & Dunn | |
| September 2 | "Play Something Country" | Brooks & Dunn | |
| September 9 | "Play Something Country" | Brooks & Dunn | |
| September 16 | "Play Something Country" | Brooks & Dunn | |
| September 23 | "A Real Fine Place to Start" | Sara Evans | |
| September 30 | "Better Life" | Keith Urban | |
| October 7 | "Better Life" | Keith Urban | |
| October 14 | "Better Life" | Keith Urban | |
| October 21 | "Better Life" | Keith Urban | |
| October 28 | "Better Life" | Keith Urban | |
| November 4 | "Better Life" | Keith Urban | |
| November 11 | "Better Life" | Keith Urban | |
| November 18 | "Who You'd Be Today" | Kenny Chesney | |
| November 25 | "Better Life" | Keith Urban | |
| December 2 | "Tequila Makes Her Clothes Fall Off" | Joe Nichols | |
| December 9 | "Who You'd Be Today" | Kenny Chesney | |
| December 16 | "Who You'd Be Today" | Kenny Chesney | |
| December 23 | "Big Blue Note" | Toby Keith | |

== Year-end chart ==
List of songs on Radio & Records's 2005 Canada Country Year-End Chart
| No. | Title | Artist(s) |
|---|---|---|
| 1 | "My Give a Damn's Busted" | Jo Dee Messina |
| 2 | "Nothin' to Lose" | Josh Gracin |
| 3 | "Lot of Leavin' Left to Do" | Dierks Bentley |
| 4 | "Bless the Broken Road" | Rascal Flatts |
| 5 | "Gone" | Montgomery Gentry |
| 6 | "Making Memories of Us" | Keith Urban |
| 7 | "You're My Better Half" | Keith Urban |
| 8 | "Mississippi Girl" | Faith Hill |
| 9 | "Fast Cars and Freedom" | Rascal Flatts |
| 10 | "Something More" | Sugarland |
| 11 | "Mud on the Tires" | Brad Paisley |
| 12 | "Waitin' on the Wonderful" | Aaron Lines † |
| 13 | "As Good as I Once Was" | Toby Keith |
| 14 | "Anything but Mine" | Kenny Chesney |
| 15 | "Baby Girl" | Sugarland |
| 16 | "A Real Fine Place to Start" | Sara Evans |
| 17 | "It's Getting Better All the Time" | Brooks & Dunn |
| 18 | "Play Something Country" | Brooks & Dunn |
| 19 | "Nothin' 'bout Love Makes Sense" | LeAnn Rimes |
| 20 | "My Name" | George Canyon † |
| 21 | "Homewrecker" | Gretchen Wilson |
| 22 | "Some Beach" | Blake Shelton |
| 23 | "I'm a Road Hammer" | The Road Hammers † |
| 24 | "Dress Rehearsal" | Carolyn Dawn Johnson † |
| 25 | "You'll Be There" | George Strait |

† indicates Canadian content (Cancon)

== See also ==
- 2005 in music
- List of Hot Country Songs number ones of 2005
