= Days Go By (Keith Urban album) =

Compilation album by Keith Urban
- Released: 20 May 2005
- Recorded: 2002–04
- Genre: Country
- Length: 68:07
- Label: Capitol Nashville; EMI
- Producer: Dann Huff; Keith Urban

Keith Urban chronology
Be Here (2004)	Days Go By (2005)	Love, Pain & the Whole Crazy Thing (2006)

Professional ratings
Review scores
Source	Rating
AllMusic	3.5/5 stars

Days Go By is the second compilation album by Australian country music artist Keith Urban, released on 20 May 2005 by Capitol Nashville. The album is named for his 2004 single of the same name, included on his previous full-length album, Be Here (2004). Also included on this album are tracks from that album and Golden Road (2002).

== Album cover ==
The front cover features the same picture used on the American release of Urban's album Be Here.

== Track listing ==
No.	Title	Writer(s)	Length
1.	"Days Go By" (Jeremy Wheatley Mix)	Monty Powell; Keith Urban	3:39
2.	"Somebody Like You"	John Shanks; Urban	5:21
3.	"Raining on Sunday"	Darrel Brown; Radney Foster	4:45
4.	"You're My Better Half"	Shanks; Urban	4:12
5.	"You'll Think of Me"	Brown; Ty Lacy; Dennis Matosky	4:56
6.	"You Won"	Rodney Crowell; Urban	4:59
7.	"Making Memories of Us" (Remix by Justin Niebank)	Crowell	3:55
8.	"You (Or Somebody Like You)"	Gordie Sampson; Blair Daly; Troy Verges	4:50
9.	"Nobody Drinks Alone"	Matraca Berg; Jim Collins	5:20
10.	"She's Gotta Be"	Powell; Urban	4:52
11.	"Tonight I Wanna Cry"	Powell; Urban	4:18
12.	"You're Not Alone Tonight"	Urban	3:30
13.	"Better Life"	Richard Marx; Urban	4:43
14.	"Live to Love Another Day"	Brown; Urban	3:29
15.	"These Are the Days"	Powell; Urban	2:49
Total length:			68:07

== Personnel ==
- Keith Urban – lead guitar, acoustic guitar, lead vocals, banjo, cardboard box and ebow
- Chris McHugh – drums, percussion
- Jimmie Lee Sloas – bass
- Tom Bukovac – rhythm guitar
- Dann Huff – mandolin
- Tim Akers – accordion, keyboards
- Jonathan Yudkin – fiddle
- Eric Darken – percussion
- Russel Terrell – vocals
- Scotty Huff – vocals
- Steve Nathan – keyboards
- Dan Dugmore – electric guitars

== Chart performance ==
Chart (2005)	Peak position
German Albums (Offizielle Top 100)	58
Irish Albums (IRMA)	7
Scottish Albums (OCC)	19
UK Albums (OCC)	40

== Certifications ==
Region	Certification	Certified units/sales
Ireland (IRMA)	Gold	7,500^{^}
United Kingdom (BPI)	Silver	60,000^{*}
^{*} Sales figures based on certification alone.^{^} Shipments figures based on certification alone.
