= List of Hot Country Songs number ones of 2005 =

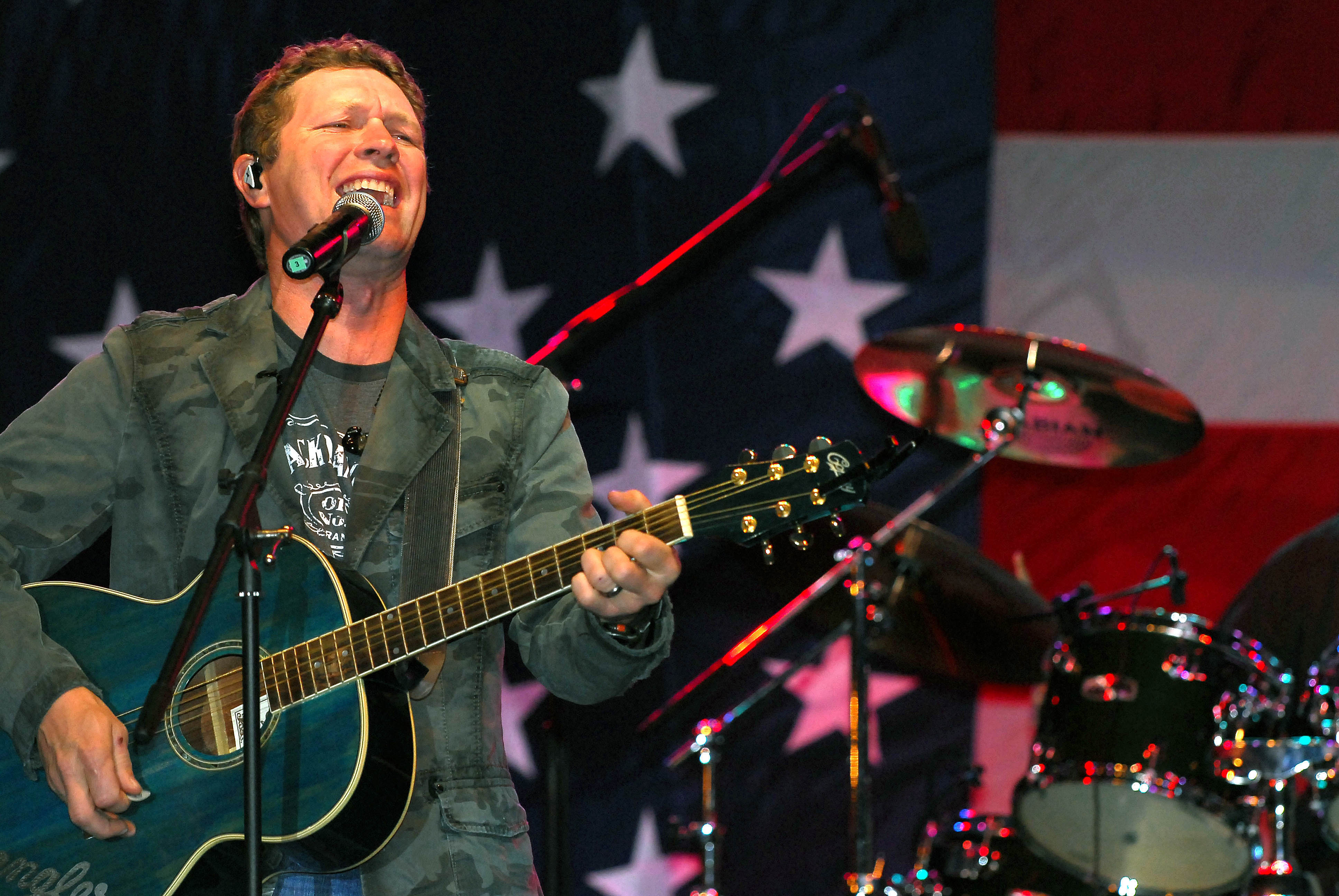
Craig Morgan's song "That's What I Love About Sunday" was named the number-one country song of 2005 by Billboard.

Hot Country Songs is a chart that ranks the top-performing country music songs in the United States, published by Billboard magazine. In 2005, twenty different songs topped the chart, published under the title Hot Country Singles & Tracks through the April 23 issue, in 52 issues of the magazine, based on weekly airplay data from country music radio stations compiled by Nielsen SoundScan.

Singer Blake Shelton's song "Some Beach" was at number one at the start of the year, having risen to the top in the issue of Billboard dated December 25, 2004. The song remained at number one for three further weeks until it was replaced at the top by "Awful, Beautiful Life" by Darryl Worley in the issue dated January 22. Australian singer Keith Urban spent the most weeks at number one in 2005, with eleven, comprising five weeks with "Making Memories of Us" and six with "Better Life", the latter of which tied for the most weeks at number one by a single song with "As Good as I Once Was" by Toby Keith. Two other acts reached the top of the chart with more than one song in 2005. Brooks & Dunn topped the chart with "It's Getting Better All the Time" in May and "Play Something Country" in September, although each only spent one week at number one. Rascal Flatts, in contrast, spent eight weeks in total at number one with their two chart-toppers, "Bless the Broken Road" and "Fast Cars and Freedom".

Although it did not spend as long at the top as Urban's and Keith's songs, the song that was ranked number one on Billboard's year-end chart of the most popular country songs was "That's What I Love About Sunday" by Craig Morgan, which spent four weeks at number one in March and April. Despite this success, it remains Morgan's only Hot Country Songs number one. Two other artists reached the top of the chart for the first time in 2005. In March, Josh Gracin achieved his first and only number one with "Nothin' to Lose", making him the first of a number of former American Idol finalists to achieve success on the country charts. In the final week of the year, Billy Currington topped the chart for the first time with "Must Be Doin' Somethin' Right".

== Chart history ==
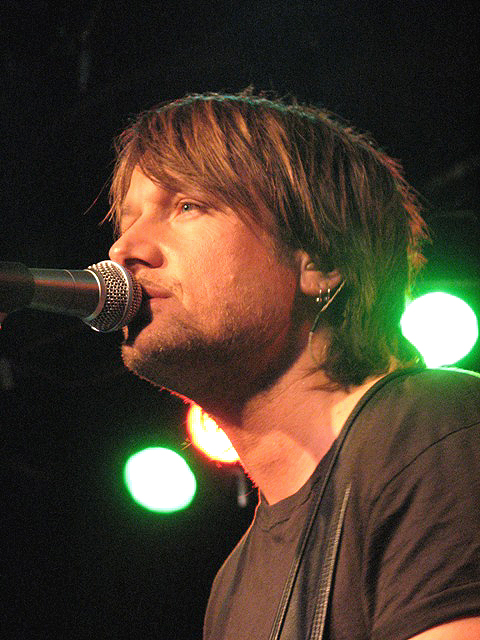
Keith Urban spent eleven weeks at number one.

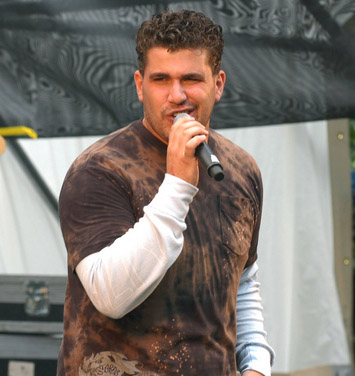
Josh Gracin achieved his first number one in 2005, two years after he was a finalist on American Idol.

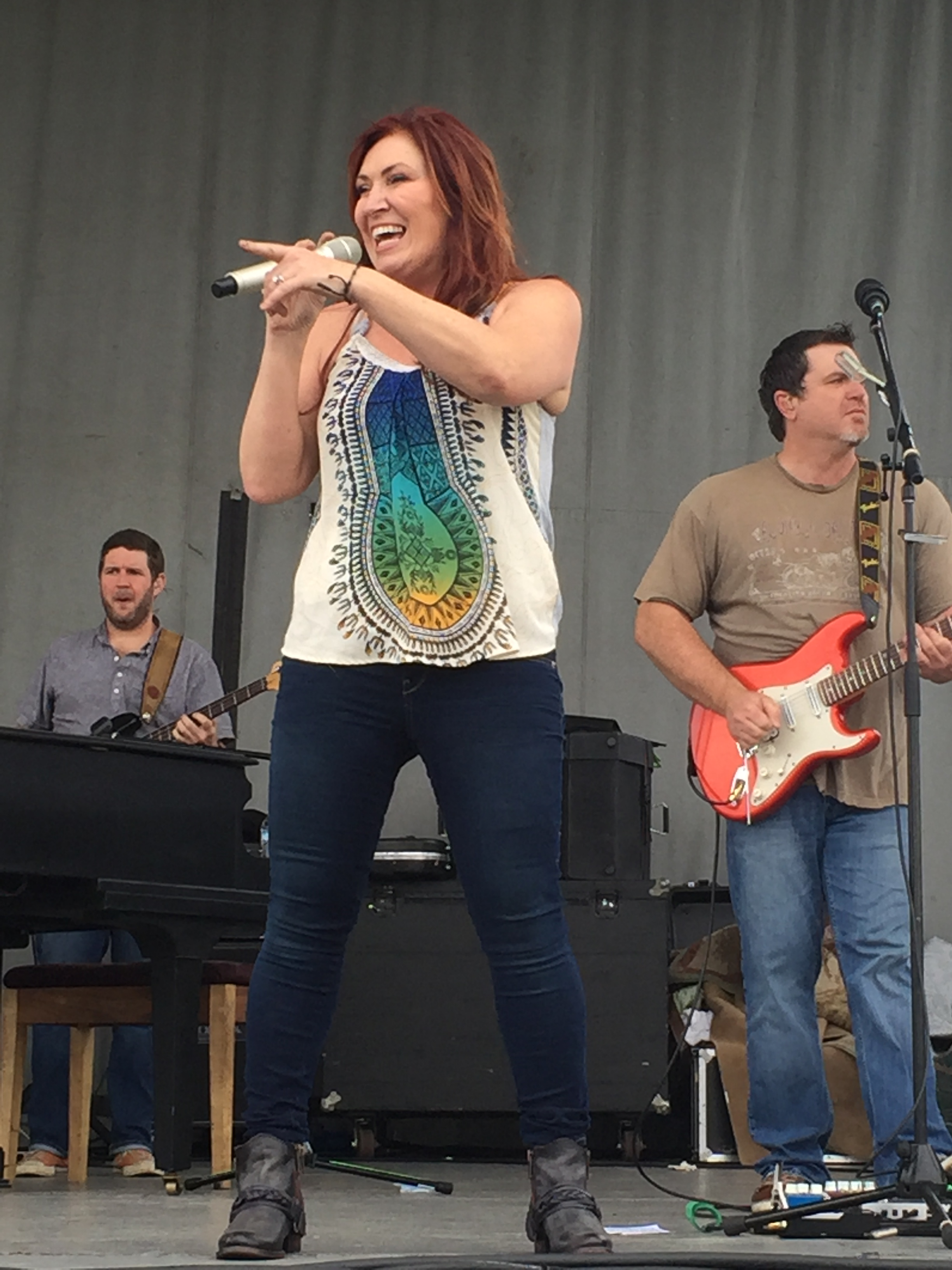
Jo Dee Messina was one of three female soloists to top the chart in 2005.

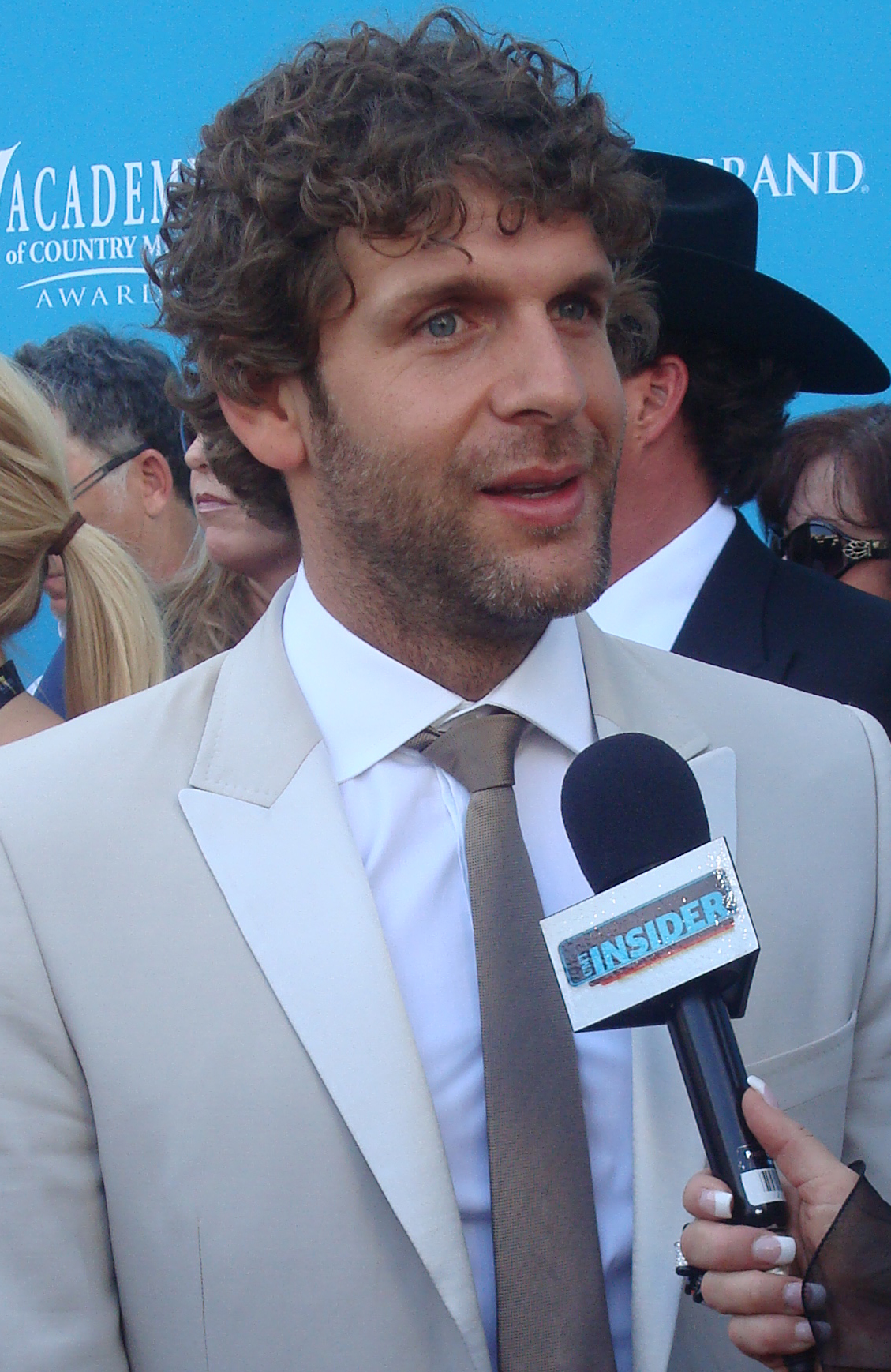
Billy Currington ended the year at number one.

Issue date	Title	Artist(s)	Ref.
January 1	"Some Beach"	Blake Shelton	
January 8	"Some Beach"	Blake Shelton	
January 15	"Some Beach"	Blake Shelton	
January 22	"Awful, Beautiful Life"	Darryl Worley	
January 29	"Awful, Beautiful Life"	Darryl Worley	
February 5	"Mud on the Tires"	Brad Paisley	
February 12	"Bless the Broken Road"	Rascal Flatts	
February 19	"Bless the Broken Road"	Rascal Flatts	
February 26	"Bless the Broken Road"	Rascal Flatts	
March 5	"Bless the Broken Road"	Rascal Flatts	
March 12	"Bless the Broken Road"	Rascal Flatts	
March 19	"Nothin' to Lose"	Josh Gracin	
March 26	"That's What I Love About Sunday"	Craig Morgan	
April 2	"That's What I Love About Sunday"	Craig Morgan	
April 9	"That's What I Love About Sunday"	Craig Morgan	
April 16	"That's What I Love About Sunday"	Craig Morgan	
April 23	"Anything but Mine"	Kenny Chesney	
April 30	"Anything but Mine"	Kenny Chesney	
May 7	"It's Getting Better All the Time"	Brooks & Dunn	
May 14	"My Give a Damn's Busted"	Jo Dee Messina	
May 21	"My Give a Damn's Busted"	Jo Dee Messina	
May 28	"Making Memories of Us"	Keith Urban	
June 4	"Making Memories of Us"	Keith Urban	
June 11	"Making Memories of Us"	Keith Urban	
June 18	"Making Memories of Us"	Keith Urban	
June 25	"Making Memories of Us"	Keith Urban	
July 2	"Fast Cars and Freedom"	Rascal Flatts	
July 9	"Fast Cars and Freedom"	Rascal Flatts	
July 16	"Fast Cars and Freedom"	Rascal Flatts	
July 23	"As Good as I Once Was"	Toby Keith	
July 30	"As Good as I Once Was"	Toby Keith	
August 6	"As Good as I Once Was"	Toby Keith	
August 13	"As Good as I Once Was"	Toby Keith	
August 20	"As Good as I Once Was"	Toby Keith	
August 27	"As Good as I Once Was"	Toby Keith	
September 3	"Mississippi Girl"	Faith Hill	
September 10	"Mississippi Girl"	Faith Hill	
September 17	"Play Something Country"	Brooks & Dunn	
September 24	"A Real Fine Place to Start"	Sara Evans	
October 1	"A Real Fine Place to Start"	Sara Evans	
October 8	"Something to Be Proud Of"	Montgomery Gentry	
October 15	"Something to Be Proud Of"	Montgomery Gentry	
October 22	"Better Life"	Keith Urban	
October 29	"Better Life"	Keith Urban	
November 5	"Better Life"	Keith Urban	
November 12	"Better Life"	Keith Urban	
November 19	"Better Life"	Keith Urban	
November 26	"Better Life"	Keith Urban	
December 3	"Come a Little Closer"	Dierks Bentley	
December 10	"Come a Little Closer"	Dierks Bentley	
December 17	"Tequila Makes Her Clothes Fall Off"	Joe Nichols	
December 24	"Come a Little Closer"	Dierks Bentley	
December 31	"Must Be Doin' Somethin' Right"	Billy Currington	

== See also ==
- 2005 in music
- List of artists who reached number one on the U.S. country chart
