= Days Go By =

Days Go By may refer to:

- Days Go By (Daryl Braithwaite album), 2017
- Days Go By (Keith Urban album), 2005
  - "Days Go By" (Keith Urban song), 2004
- Days Go By (The Offspring album), 2012
  - "Days Go By" (The Offspring song)
- "Days Go By" (Dirty Vegas song), 2001
- "Days Go By", a song by Not By Choice from their 2004 album Secondhand Opinions
- "Days Go By", a 2005 song by High Contrast
- "Days Go By", a song by Janet Jackson from the Japanese version of her 2006 album 20 Y.O.
- "Days Go By", a song by James Blake from his 2026 album Trying Times

== See also ==
- "As Days Go By", song used as the main theme for the television sitcom Family Matters
