= My Kind of Music (disambiguation) =

My Kind of Music is a British game show.

My Kind of Music may also refer to:

- My Kind of Music (Mel Tormé album), 1961
- My Kind of Music (Ray Scott album), or its title track, 2005
