= Brave (Jamie O'Neal album) =

Studio album by Jamie O'Neal
- Released: 1 March 2005
- Genre: Country
- Length: 41:05
- Label: Capitol Nashville
- Producer: Keith Stegall; Rivers Rutherford; Jamie O'Neal

Jamie O'Neal chronology
Shiver (2000)	Brave (2005)	Eternal (2014)

Singles from Brave
- 1. "Trying to Find Atlantis" Released: 27 September 2004; 2. "Somebody's Hero" Released: 4 April 2005; 3. "I Love My Life" Released: 28 November 2005

Professional ratings
Review scores
Source	Rating
Allmusic	3/5 stars
People	2.5/4 stars

Brave is the second studio album by Australian country music singer Jamie O'Neal. It was her first release on the Capitol Nashville label, being issued on 1 March 2005 (see 2005 in country music). It followed an unreleased second album for Mercury Records, titled On My Way to You, the title track of which carried over to Brave. The album reached a peak of number 6 on the U.S. Billboard Top Country Albums chart and number 40 on the Billboard 200.

== Content ==
Three singles were released from the album. All three charted in the Top 30 of the charts. "Trying to Find Atlantis" reached number 18, "Somebody's Hero" reached number 3, and "I Love My Life" reached number 26. After this album, O'Neal released a single titled "God Don't Make Mistakes" in 2007. This single failed to reach Top 40, however, and O'Neal exited Capitol as well.

All but two tracks on this album were produced by Keith Stegall, who also produced O'Neal's debut album. "Devil on the Left" and "Girlfriends" were co-produced by O'Neal and Rivers Rutherford.

== Track listing ==
No.	Title	Writer(s)	Length
1.	"Trying to Find Atlantis"	Chris Waters, Zack Turner	3:28
2.	"Naïve"	Jamie O'Neal, Shaye Smith, Tim Nichols	4:01
3.	"Somebody's Hero"	O'Neal, Smith, Ed Hill	3:41
4.	"When Did You Know"	Tim Mensy, Monty Criswell	3:43
5.	"Devil on the Left"	O'Neal, Lisa Drew, Rivers Rutherford	4:28
6.	"On My Way to You"	O'Neal, Smith, Nichols	4:19
7.	"Follow Me Home"	O'Neal, Smith, Brett James	4:01
8.	"Girlfriends"	O'Neal, Drew, Jimmy Murphy	2:57
9.	"Ready When It Comes"	O'Neal, Annie Roboff, Beth Nielsen Chapman	4:05
10.	"Brave"	O'Neal, Roboff, Nichols	3:27
11.	"I Love My Life"	O'Neal, Smith, Nichols	2:56

== Personnel ==
As listed in liner notes.

- Kenny Aronoff – drums (6)
- Kelly Back – electric guitar (2)
- Tom Bukovac – electric guitar (2, 4, 9)
- Beth Nielsen Chapman – acoustic guitar (9)
- Eric Darken – percussion (2, 4, 6, 7, 9)
- Stuart Duncan – fiddle (1, 11), mandolin (1, 3, 10)
- Paul Franklin – steel guitar (2, 6)
- Kenny Greenberg – electric guitar (5, 8)
- Owen Hale – drums (2, 4, 7, 9)
- Tony Harrell – accordion (2, 7)
- John Hobbs – organ (6)
- B. James Lowry – acoustic guitar (2)
- Chris McHugh – drums (1, 3, 10, 11)
- Brent Mason – acoustic guitar (2), electric guitar (1–4, 6, 7, 9–11)
- Greg Morrow – drums (5, 8)
- Jamie O'Neal – lead vocals
- Russ Pahl – steel guitar (5, 8)
- Billy Panda – acoustic guitar (4, 6, 7)
- Gary Prim – keyboards (4, 10)
- Michael Rhodes – bass guitar (5, 8)
- Matt Rollings – organ (1–3, 9), piano (3, 4, 7, 10, 11)
- Rivers Rutherford – acoustic guitar (5, 8)
- Scotty Sanders – Dobro (1, 11), steel guitar (3, 10)
- Bryan Sutton – acoustic guitar (5, 8)
- Michael Thompson – acoustic guitar (6), electric guitar (6), drum loops (6)
- Travis Toy – Dobro (5)
- Bruce Watkins – acoustic guitar (10), banjo (1, 3, 11)
- Biff Watson – acoustic guitar (1, 3, 10, 11)
- Glenn Worf – bass guitar (1–4, 6, 7, 9–11)
- Reese Wynans – organ (5, 8)
- Jonathan Yudkin – cello (4, 6, 7), bouzouki (7), fiddle (2, 6, 7), National guitar (7), mandolin (2)

Background vocals

- Bekka Bramlett – track 1
- Beth Nielsen Chapman – track 9
- Lisa Cochran – track 3, 11
- Perry Coleman – track 3
- Roxie Dean – track 8
- Rodney Good – tracks 2, 3, 4, 6, 7, 9, 10, 11
- Autumn House – track 8
- Cindy Jenkins – track 8
- Carolyn Dawn Johnson – track 1
- Hillary Lindsey – track 6
- Melissa Murphy – track 8
- Minnie Murphy – track 8
- Jamie O'Neal – track 1, 4, 5, 6, 8, 9, 11
- CiCi Rutherford – track 5
- Maggie Rutherford – track 5
- Rivers Rutherford – track 5
- Tori Vance – track 8

"Na-Na"s and hand claps on "Naïve"

Tracy Broussard, Jeremy Deloach, Robby Emerson, Dana Good, Rodney Good, Tania Smith-Van Hoy, Timothy Moore.

Special guests on "I Love My Life"

Aliyah Good, Griffin Good

== Chart performance ==
=== Weekly charts ===
Chart (2005)	Peak position
US Billboard 200	40
US Top Country Albums (Billboard)	6

=== Year-end charts ===
Chart (2005)	Position
US Top Country Albums (Billboard)	61

=== Singles ===
Year	Single	Peak chart positions	
Year	Single	US Country	US
2004	"Trying to Find Atlantis"	18	86
2005	"Somebody's Hero"	3	51
2005	"I Love My Life"	26	—
