= Eternal (Jamie O'Neal album) =

Studio album by Jamie O'Neal
- Released: May 27, 2014
- Genre: Country
- Length: 41:20
- Label: Shanachie
- Producers: Jamie O'Neal, Rodney Good

Jamie O'Neal chronology
Brave (2005)	Eternal (2014)	Sometimes (2020)

Singles from Eternal
- 1. "Wide Awake" Released: July 2014

Eternal is the third studio album by Australian country music singer Jamie O'Neal. It was released on 27 May 2014 via Shanachie Records. Except for the first single, "Wide Awake", every song is a cover song. Her first new studio album since 2005's Brave.

== Content ==
Artists covered on the album include Emmylou Harris, Juice Newton, Connie Smith, and Larry Gatlin. On her choices for content, O'Neal told Billboard that "These songs had a lot to do with my childhood… I think I based the album what I loved and listened to when I was a kid. I think it's so important to keep the heritage alive in this technological world is so important. It's so easy to get away from where we came from. It's important for me to keep those songs alive."

The only original song is "Wide Awake", which O'Neal wrote with her father, Jimmy Murphy. She also co-produced the album with her husband, Rodney Good.

== Critical reception ==
Jeffrey B. Remz of Country Standard Time rated the album favorably, saying that "Credit also goes to Good and O'Neal for not only accentuating her vocal skills, but also not being afraid to let the traditional country sounds filter throughout." Bobby Peacock of Roughstock rated it 4.5 out of 5 stars, writing, "The song variety is excellent, offering plenty of forgotten gems and familiar songs. While most of the arrangements aren't terribly far-removed from their originals… Jamie leaves her own mark on every single one by merit of her colorful singing voice alone".

== Track listing ==
1. "Born to Run" (Paul Kennerley) — 3:38
2. "Don't Come Home A' Drinkin' (With Lovin' on Your Mind)" (Loretta Lynn, Peggy Sue) — 2:46
3. "Golden Ring" (Bobby Braddock, Rafe Van Hoy) — 3:04
  - duet with Andy Griggs
4. "Help Me Make It Through the Night" (Kris Kristofferson) — 3:42
5. "I've Done Enough Dyin' Today" (Larry Gatlin) — 4:25
6. "Just One Time" (Don Gibson) — 2:50
7. "Leavin' on Your Mind" (Webb Pierce, Wayne Walker) — 3:58
8. "One Day I Walk" (Bruce Cockburn) — 4:34
9. "Rock Me (In the Cradle of Love)" (Deborah Allen, Van Hoy) — 4:05
10. "The Sweetest Thing (I've Ever Known)" (Otha Young) — 4:07
11. "Wide Awake" (Jamie O'Neal, Jimmy Murphy) — 4:11

== Personnel ==
- Bob Britt - electric guitar
- Pat Buchanon - electric guitar
- Joeie Canaday - bass guitar
- Bob Emerson - bass guitar
- Paul Franklin - steel guitar
- Owen Hale - drums
- Tony Harrell - Hammond B-3 organ, keyboards
- Mark Hill - bass guitar
- Charlie Judge - Hammond B-3 organ, keyboards, strings
- Jamie O'Neal - lead vocals, background vocals
- Scotty Sanders - dobro, steel guitar
- Ilya Toshinsky - acoustic guitar, electric guitar, banjo
- Travis Toy - dobro, steel guitar
- Jonathan Yudkin - cello, fiddle
