= Be Here =

Studio album by Keith Urban
- Released: 21 September 2004
- Studio: Blackbird (Nashville, Tennessee); Capitol (Hollywood, California); Emerald Sound (Nashville, Tennessee); Hound's Ear (Franklin, Tennessee); Sound Kitchen (Franklin, Tennessee); Starstruck (Nashville, Tennessee); The Castle (Franklin, Tennessee)
- Genre: Country
- Length: 55:39
- Label: Capitol Nashville
- Producer: Dann Huff; Keith Urban

Keith Urban chronology
Golden Road (2002)	Be Here (2004)	Days Go By (2005)

Alternative cover
- 2005 re-issue and digital cover

Singles from Be Here
- 1. "Days Go By" Released: 29 June 2004; 2. "You're My Better Half" Released: 25 October 2004; 3. "Making Memories of Us" Released: 21 March 2005; 4. "Better Life" Released: 30 July 2005; 5. "Tonight I Wanna Cry" Released: 21 November 2005

Professional ratings
Review scores
Source	Rating
Allmusic	4/5 stars
Rolling Stone	3/5 stars
Entertainment Weekly	B

Be Here is the fourth studio album by Australian country singer Keith Urban. It was released on 21 September 2004, through Capitol Nashville. With four million copies sold, the album is not only Urban's best-selling album, but also one of the best-selling albums in America by an Australian artist.

The album produced three number 1 singles on the Hot Country Songs chart with "Days Go By", "Making Memories of Us" and "Better Life", as well as the number 2 hits "You're My Better Half" and "Tonight I Wanna Cry". The song "Live to Love Another Day" also peaked at number 48 on the country charts, even though it was not released as a single.

== Content ==
"Making Memories of Us", written by Rodney Crowell, was originally recorded by Tracy Byrd on his 2003 album The Truth About Men. It was also recorded by Crowell himself, along with his backing band The Notorious Cherry Bombs, on their 2004 self-titled album. Most recently the song has been recorded by country legend Willie Nelson, on his latest album "Oh What a Beautiful World". Nine of the album's songs were written by Urban. Urban produced the tracks "God's Been Good to Me" and "Live to Love Another Day" himself, and then he co-produced the rest of the tracks with Dann Huff.

"Country Comfort" is a cover of a track from Elton John's Tumbleweed Connection.

== Critical reception ==
The album has received positive reviews from Allmusic, BBC, Entertainment Weekly, and Rolling Stone. Three tracks from the album, "Days Go By", "Making Memories of Us", and "Tonight I Want to Cry" were included in an About.com ranking of Urban's top ten songs.

=== Accolades ===
Be Here received a Grammy Award nomination for Best Country Album, and won Academy of Country Music Award for Album of the Year. The album was also nominated for Album of the Year at the 40th Annual Country Music Association Awards.

== Commercial performance ==
The album was certified 4× Platinum by Recording Industry Association of America (RIAA), and remains as Urban's best-selling album to date, with sales of 3,639,000 copies in the United States, as of July 2009; it also reached number 8 on the Canadian album chart, number 1 on the Billboard Hot Country Albums chart, and number 3 on the Billboard 200.

== Track listing ==
No.	Title	Writer(s)	Length
1.	"Days Go By"	Keith Urban; Monty Powell	3:48
2.	"Better Life"	Urban; Richard Marx	4:42
3.	"Making Memories of Us"	Rodney Crowell	4:11
4.	"God's Been Good to Me"	Urban	3:37
5.	"The Hard Way"	Rivers Rutherford; Gordie Sampson	4:37
6.	"You're My Better Half"	Urban; John Shanks	4:12
7.	"I Could Fly"	Urban; Shanks	5:19
8.	"Tonight I Wanna Cry"	Urban; Powell	4:19
9.	"She's Gotta Be"	Urban; Powell	4:52
10.	"Nobody Drinks Alone"	Matraca Berg; Jim Collins	5:21
11.	"Country Comfort"	Elton John; Bernie Taupin	4:23
12.	"Live to Love Another Day"	Urban; Darrell Brown	3:29
13.	"These Are the Days"	Urban; Powell	2:49
Total length:			55:39

Australian release bonus track
No.	Title	Writer(s)	Length
14.	"You (Or Somebody Like You)"	Sampson; Blair Daly; Troy Verges	4:51

== Personnel ==
- Tim Akers – accordion (tracks 1, 7), keyboards (1–3, 6–7, 10), Hammond organ (9), piano (3)
- Charlie Bisharat – violin (tracks 8–9)
- Bruce Bouton – Dobro guitar (track 9), steel guitar (11)
- Paul Buckmaster – string conductor, string arrangements (tracks 8–9)
- Denyse Buffum – viola (tracks 8–9)
- Tom Bukovac – acoustic guitar (track 12), electric guitar (2–7, 10), slide guitar (7), wah wah guitar (7), additional guitars (1, 3, 8–9, 11, 13)
- Paul Bushnell – bass guitar (tracks 3, 5, 9, 11)
- Matt Chamberlain – drums (tracks 3, 5, 9, 11), percussion (3, 5, 9)
- Larry Corbett – cello (tracks 8–9)
- Eric Darken – percussion (tracks 1–2, 6–8, 10–11, additional: 3)
- Bruce Dukov – violin (tracks 8–9)
- Matt Funes – viola (tracks 8–9)
- Armen Garabedian – violin (tracks 8–9)
- Berj Garabedian – violin (tracks 8–9)
- Endre Granat – violin (tracks 8–9)
- Paula Hochhalter – cello (tracks 8–9)
- Dann Huff – acoustic 12-string guitar (track 3), electric guitar (6), mandolin (1, 11)
- Suzie Katayama – cello (tracks 8–9)
- Peter Kent – violin (tracks 8–9)
- Steven King – accordion (track 13)
- Natalie Leggett – violin (tracks 8–9)
- Chris McHugh – drums (tracks 1–2, 4, 6–8, 10, 12–13), percussion (4, 12)
- Robert Matsuda – violin (tracks 8–9)
- Steve Nathan – piano (track 8)
- Jimmy Nichols – keyboards (5), piano (11), synthesizer strings (9)
- Sara Parkins – violin (tracks 8–9)
- Bob Peterson – violin (tracks 8–9)
- Kevin Pickle - assistant engineer
- Steve Richards – cello (tracks 8–9)
- Jimmie Lee Sloas – bass guitar (tracks 1–2, 4, 6–8, 10, 12–13)
- Dan Smith – cello (tracks 8–9)
- Charles Stegeman – violin (tracks 8–9)
- Rachel Stegeman – violin (tracks 8–9)
- Rudy Stein – cello (tracks 8–9)
- Russell Terrell – background vocals (tracks 1–3, 5–7, 9–10, 13)
- Chris Thile – mandolin (track 9)
- Keith Urban – banjo (tracks 2, 4, 6–7, 11–13), EBow (1, 5), acoustic 12-string guitar (3), acoustic guitar (1–7, 9–13), electric guitar (1–7, 9–12), hand clapping, mandolin (7, 13), slide guitar (4), lead vocals (All tracks), background vocals (tracks 1–10, 12–13, harmony: 11)
- Josefina Vergara – violin (tracks 8–9)
- Evan Wilson – viola (tracks 8–9)
- Jonathan Yudkin – cello (track 3), fiddle (1, 13)

== Charts ==
=== Weekly charts ===
Chart (2004)	Peak position
Australian Albums (ARIA)	11
Canadian Albums (Billboard)	8
US Billboard 200	3
US Top Country Albums (Billboard)	1

=== Year-end charts ===
Chart (2004)	Position
US Billboard 200	191
US Top Country Albums (Billboard)	35
Chart (2005)	Position
Australian Albums (ARIA)	57
US Billboard 200	30
US Top Country Albums (Billboard)	7
Chart (2006)	Position
US Billboard 200	29
US Top Country Albums (Billboard)	8

=== Singles ===
Year	Single	Peak chart positions						Certifications
Year	Single	US Country	US	US AC	US Adult	AUS	NL	Certifications
2004	"Days Go By"	1	31	—	—	56	99	* RIAA: Gold
2004	"You're My Better Half"	2	33	—	—	34	—	* RIAA: Gold
2005	"Making Memories of Us"	1	34	5	22	54	—	* RIAA: Platinum
2005	"Better Life"	1	44	—	—	—	—	* RIAA: Gold
2005	"Tonight I Wanna Cry"^{[A]}	2	36	—	—	72	—	* RIAA: Platinum
"—" denotes releases that did not chart

Footnotes

- A: "Tonight I Wanna Cry" charted in Australia in 2011, after it was performed by a contestant on The X Factor Australia.

== Certifications ==
Region	Certification	Certified units/sales
Australia (ARIA)	3× Platinum	210,000^{^}
Canada (Music Canada)	2× Platinum	200,000^{^}
United States (RIAA)	4× Platinum	4,000,000^{^}
^{^} Shipments figures based on certification alone.

== Release history ==
Country	Date	Label
Canada	21 September 2004	Capitol Nashville
United States	21 September 2004	Capitol Nashville
Australia	30 November 2004	Capitol Nashville
