= Honkytonk University =

Studio album by Toby Keith
- Released: May 17, 2005
- Genre: Country
- Length: 41:22
- Label: DreamWorks
- Producers: Toby Keith; James Stroud

Toby Keith chronology
Greatest Hits 2 (2004)	Honkytonk University (2005)	White Trash with Money (2006)

Singles from Honkytonk University
- 1. "Honkytonk U" Released: February 8, 2005; 2. "As Good as I Once Was" Released: May 9, 2005; 3. "Big Blue Note" Released: September 5, 2005

Professional ratings
Aggregate scores
Source	Rating
Metacritic	(68/100)
Review scores
Source	Rating
About.com	3.5/5 stars
Allmusic	4.5/5 stars
Blender	3/5 stars
Robert Christgau	(dud)
E! Online	B−
Entertainment Weekly	A−
Los Angeles Times	3/4 stars
Rolling Stone	2/5 stars
Slant Magazine	2/5 stars
Stylus Magazine	C

Honkytonk University is the tenth studio album by American country music artist Toby Keith. It was released on May 17, 2005 by DreamWorks Records. The album has been certified 1× Platinum for sales of in excess of 1 million units. "Honkytonk U" was the first single to be released from the album, breaking the country top 10. "As Good as I Once Was" was the album's biggest hit, topping the Billboard Hot Country Songs charts for six weeks. It was Keith's last studio album for DreamWorks before the label's bankruptcy in 2006.

== Track listing ==
All songs written by Toby Keith and Scotty Emerick except where noted.

No.	Title	Writer(s)	Length
1.	"Honkytonk U"	Toby Keith	3:35
2.	"As Good as I Once Was"		3:49
3.	"She Ain't Hooked on Me No More" (duet with Merle Haggard)		3:36
4.	"Big Blue Note"		2:58
5.	"Just the Guy to Do It"		2:59
6.	"She Left Me"	Keith	3:21
7.	"Knock Yourself Out"	Keith, Emerick, Dean Dillon	3:05
8.	"You Ain't Leavin' (Thank God Are Ya)"	Keith, Emerick, Dillon	3:13
9.	"I Got It Bad"	Keith, Chuck Cannon	3:51
10.	"Your Smile"		3:24
11.	"Where You Gonna Go"		4:04
12.	"You Caught Me at a Bad Time"		3:27

== Personnel ==
- Eddie Bayers – drums on "Honkytonk U"
- Mark Casstevens – acoustic guitar on "Honkytonk U"
- Dan Dugmore – steel guitar on "Honkytonk U"
- Scotty Emerick – acoustic guitar
- Shannon Forrest – drums on all tracks except "Honkytonk U"
- Paul Franklin – steel guitar, dobro
- Merle Haggard – duet vocals on "She Ain't Hooked on Me No More"
- Tony Harrell – piano, keyboards on "Honkytonk U"
- Wes Hightower – background vocals
- Johnny Hiland – electric guitar on "She Left Me"
- David Hungate – bass guitar on "Honkytonk U"
- Clayton Ivey – piano, keyboards, Hammond B-3 organ
- Toby Keith – lead vocals
- Julian King – background vocals
- B. James Lowry – acoustic guitar on "Honkytonk U"
- Brent Mason – electric guitar
- Gordon Mote – piano, keyboards on "Honkytonk U"
- Steve Nathan – piano, keyboards, Hammond B-3 organ
- Jerry McPherson – electric guitar
- Mickey Raphael – harmonica
- Brent Rowan – electric guitar on "Honkytonk U"
- John Wesley Ryles – background vocals
- Biff Watson – acoustic guitar
- Glenn Worf – bass guitar on all tracks except "Honkytonk U"

== Charts ==
=== Weekly charts ===
Chart (2005)	Peak position
US Billboard 200	2
US Top Country Albums (Billboard)	1

=== Year-end charts ===
Chart (2005)	Position
US Billboard 200	37
US Top Country Albums (Billboard)	8
Chart (2006)	Position
US Top Country Albums (Billboard)	42

== Certifications ==
Region	Certification	Certified units/sales
Canada (Music Canada)	Gold	50,000^{^}
United States (RIAA)	Platinum	1,000,000^{^}
^{^} Shipments figures based on certification alone.
