= Ride (Shelly Fairchild album) =

Studio album by Shelly Fairchild
- Released: May 3, 2005
- Genre: Country
- Label: Columbia Nashville
- Producer: Shelly Fairchild, Buddy Cannon, Kenny Greenberg

Ride is the debut studio album by American country music artist Shelly Fairchild, released in March 2005 (see 2005 in country music) on Columbia Records. It includes the singles "You Don't Lie Here Anymore", "Tiny Town" and "Kiss Me". Although "You Don't Lie Here Anymore" reached #35 on the U.S. country singles charts in late 2004, the other two singles failed to chart.

== Critical reception ==
Stephen Thomas Erlewine of Allmusic gave the album four-and-a-half stars out of five, saying that it was "well-crafted, built upon a strong set of songs, and it pulls off the nifty trick of being classic Nashville product yet fresh and vibrant, due to Fairchild's consistently engaging performances." Entertainment Weekly critic Chris Willman rated it B+, describing the album's sound as "skirting the virtually bygone line between country and Southern rock" and commending Fairchild's vocal performance on "Kiss Me." Jeffrey B. Remz of Country Standard Time also praised Fairchild's vocals, but criticized the production of some tracks for being "too polished."

== Track listing ==
No.	Title	Writer(s)	Length
1.	"Kiss Me"	Shelly Fairchild, Stephony Smith	3:04
2.	"Ready to Fall"	Lisa Carver	3:31
3.	"Tiny Town"	Fairchild, Smith	3:18
4.	"You Don't Lie Here Anymore"	Fairchild, Sonny LeMaire, Clay Mills	2:47
5.	"I Want to Love You"	Fairchild, Smith, Carver	3:33
6.	"Eight Crazy Hours (In the Story of Love)"	Leslie Satcher, Darrell Scott	3:57
7.	"Down into Muddy Water"	Dennis Linde	3:53
8.	"Ride"	Smith, Gary Loyd	3:22
9.	"Time Machine"	Doug Johnson, Chris Tompkins	3:08
10.	"I'm Goin' Back"	Bill Kenner, Pat McLaughlin	3:31
11.	"Fear of Flying"	Hillary Lindsey, Gordie Sampson	4:55

== Personnel ==
As listed in liner notes.

- David Angell - violin
- Pat Buchanan - harmonica
- Tom Bukovac - electric guitar
- Ashley Cleveland - background vocals
- J. T. Corenflos - electric guitar
- Eric Darken - percussion
- David Davidson - violin
- Chip Davis - background vocals
- Dan Dugmore - acoustic guitar, pedal steel guitar, lap steel guitar, Dobro
- Stuart Duncan - fiddle, mandolin
- Chris Dunn - trombone
- Kenny Greenberg - electric guitar, resonator guitar
- Tim Hensley - banjo
- Steven Herrman - trumpet
- Wes Hightower - background vocals
- Jim Horn - baritone saxophone, tenor saxophone
- Rob Ickes - Dobro
- Anthony LaMarchina - cello
- Liana Manis - background vocals
- Chris McHugh - drums, percussion
- Steve Nathan - piano, Hammond organ, Wurlitzer
- Larry Paxton - bass guitar
- Mickey Raphael - harmonica
- John Wesley Ryles - background vocals
- Darrell Scott - acoustic guitar, baritone guitar
- Stephony Smith - background vocals
- Dan Tyminski - acoustic guitar, mandolin, background vocals
- Kristin Wilkinson - viola, string arrangements
- John Willis - acoustic guitar, banjo
- Curtis Wright - background vocals

== Chart performance ==
Chart (2005)	Peak position
U.S. Billboard Top Country Albums	31
U.S. Billboard 200	162
U.S. Billboard Top Heatseekers	6
