= Shelly Fairchild =

American musician (born 1977)

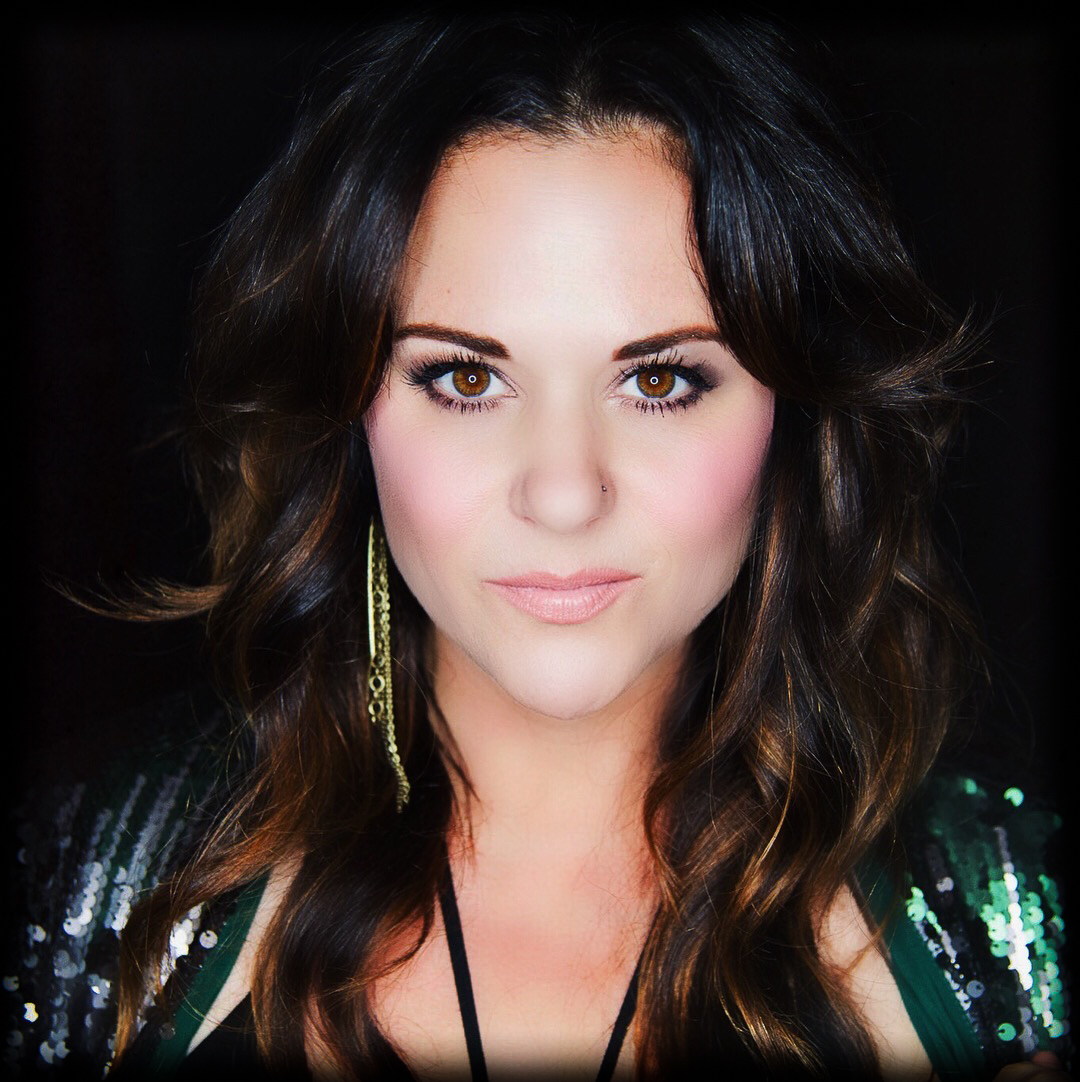

Background information
- Born: August 23, 1977 (age 49)
- Origin: Clinton, Mississippi, U.S.
- Genres: Americana, alternative country, alternative rock, pop, rock, folk rock, country
- Occupation: Singer-songwriter
- Instrument: Vocals
- Years active: 2004–present
- Label: Columbia Nashville
- Website: www.shellyfairchild.com

Shelly Fairchild (born August 23, 1977) is an American music recording artist. Signed to Columbia Records in 2004, she released her first album, Ride, in early 2005. It included the single "You Don't Lie Here Anymore", a No. 35 on the Billboard Hot Country Singles & Tracks (now Hot Country Songs) charts.

== Biography and personal life ==
Fairchild was born in Clinton, Mississippi, to a musical family. She began performing at an early age in church and later in her high school's show choir. Fairchild studied communications, theater and music at Mississippi College and subsequently starred in local stage shows including Grease and Always Patsy Cline. She also traveled with the national touring company for Beehive: The 60's Musical.

In a 2023 interview, Fairchild discussed the proliferation of rumors that she was a lesbian, which she stated she "never confirmed 100% to be true" despite executives at her label at the time, Columbia Records, requesting that she not appear in public with LGBTQ friends or partners. Fairchild also stated that she and her same-sex partner at the time attempted to keep their relationship private, although she also described herself as "marginally out [at the time]," which concerned executives at her label due to their fear that radio stations would disapprove. Her label also attempted to change her image to match the feminine beauty ideal. Around 2006, Sony Music Nashville dropped her, leading Fairchild to state, "I had a very clear message that my sexuality played a large part in the lack of interest in moving forward with me as an artist, although they obviously couldn't come right out and say that... legally." Fairchild discussed her frustration with the prevalent "bigotry and prejudices" within the country music industry, yet she also stated that the bigotry she had faced due to her sexuality inspired her to channel her anger into activism, to continue writing, and to continue "fighting for us," with "us" referring to the LGBTQ community.

== Career ==
In 2004, Fairchild signed to Columbia Records. Her first album, Ride, was issued in early 2005. Its lead-off single, "You Don't Lie Here Anymore", co-written with Clay Mills, peaked at No. 35 on the U.S. Billboard Hot Country Songs charts, although subsequent singles failed to chart. She toured in support of the album including an opening spot on Rascal Flatts' sold-out Here's to You tour which also featured Blake Shelton, but was dropped from Columbia by the end of the year.

In 2008, Fairchild signed a record deal with Stroudavarious Records which was founded by producer James Stroud. Her first release was the song "It's All Gonna Work Out", which she released for a charity album called We Are Enterprise.

On April 11, 2011, Fairchild's second album, Ruby's Money, was released; Fairchild chose to release the album on her own label, Revelation Nation Records.

In 2014, Fairchild was one of three background singers for Martina McBride's "Everlasting Tour". She considered touring with McBride to be a highlight of her career, as she has "looked up to [McBride] as a singer [her] whole life".

Between 2015 and 2016, Fairchild ran a crowdfunding campaign through PledgeMusic for money to support her efforts to record what would become her third studio album, Buffalo.

Buffalo was released in December 2016. This record entered the Top 100 Country albums on iTunes in its first week. Fairchild went on to release her first single, "Mississippi Turnpike," which she debuted in her first music video in ten years. It premiered exclusively on Taste of Country and received regular airplay on CMT, making it her first independent play on the major network since her first album Ride.

In June 2021, Fairchild sang at the Ryman Auditorium participating as a featured artist in the Nashville and Austin LGBT Chamber of Commerce Pride Event. Tina Cannon, the executive director of the Austin LGBT Chamber of Commerce, said in a statement that the show's purpose was to not only "combin[e] the talent of two of the greatest musical communities in the world," but also to "directly [support] LGBTQ+ artists."

In July 2021, Fairchild began touring with Lennon Stella as one of her background singers for her festival dates including Wonderstruck, Bonnaroo, Roots N Blues, and Moon Crush.

In 2026, Fairchild contributed backing vocals to two tracks on Melissa Etheridge's album Rise. She also co-wrote "Bottle Tells Me So", a track that appears on Ashley McBryde's album Wild. She Crowdfunded her fourth studio album Sacred Southern Daughter through Kickstarter and recorded the it in Muscle Shoals, Alabama. The album was released on August 28, 2026.

Fairchild has performed at the Grand Ole Opry.

== Other ventures and recognition ==
Fairchild has written for television and film. In January 2017, Fairchild signed with Nashville-based licensing firm Resin8.

In July 2017, Rolling Stone magazine listed Fairchild as one of the "10 New Country Artists You Need to Know".

In July 2020, Fairchild was awarded the LGBTQ Rising Star Award at Ty Herndon's "Love and Acceptance" show streamed on CMT.

In August 2020, Fairchild was featured in Brandon Stansell's documentary Three Chords and a Lie, which discusses the difficulties of coming out as a member of the LGBTQ+ community in many American communities. The documentary was streamed on the Canadian TV channel OutTV.

== Film and television placements ==
Network/Show title	Song title	Songwriters	Air date	Ref.
Valor	"Faster Than A Bullet"	Shelly Fairchild, Sam Tinnesz, Jeff Pardo	September 26, 2017	
ABC's Station 19 season finale	"Takin Over (Come On, Come On)"	Shelly Fairchild, Kurt Goebel, Ellen Tift-Goebel	May 8, 2018	
Grey's Anatomy "Help, I'm Alive" season 15 episode 10 trailer	"Get You Back"	Shelly Fairchild, Angelo Petraglia, Lincoln Parish	January 3, 2019	
ABC's Summer Fun game series	"Takin Over (Come On, Come On)"	Shelly Fairchild, Kurt Goebel, Ellen Tift-Goebel	June – August 2019	
Netflix Selling Sunset	"Faster Than A Bullet"	Shelly Fairchild, Sam Tinnesz, Jeff Pardo	March 28, 2019	
Netflix Selling Sunset	"Show Stopper"	Sam Tinnesz, Jason Eskridge, Jeff Pardo	March 30, 2019	
Riverdale episode 405	"Drive"	Shelly Fairchild, Peter Amato, Stephony Smith	November 15, 2019	
Roswell, New Mexico episode 207	"Drive"	Shelly Fairchild, Peter Amato, Stephony Smith	March 23, 2020	
Roswell, New Mexico episode 208	"Worry No More"	Shelly Fairchild, Aaron Shafer-Haiss	April 24, 2020	
Roswell, New Mexico episode 210	"Worry No More"	Shelly Fairchild, Aaron Shafer-Haiss	April 30, 2020	
Netflix Selling Sunset	"Boss Behavior"	Shelly Fairchild, Peter Amato	May 6, 2020	
NBC The Titan Games	"I Am Ready"	Shelly Fairchild, Peter Amato, Matthew Gerard	June 25, 2020	
CBS CBS News, CBS Evening News	"Nothing Better"	Shelly Fairchild, Nick Brophy, Moe Loughran	July 20, 2020	
NBC The Titan Games	"This Is What I Came For"	Shelly Fairchild, Peter Amato, Matthew Gerard	July 20, 2020	
Netflix Selling Sunset	"On That Hustle"	Shelly Fairchild, Peter Amato	July 28, 2020	
Netflix Selling Sunset	"Wild Out"	Shelly Fairchild, Peter Amato	July 30, 2020	
Netflix Selling Sunset	"Out Alive"	Shelly Fairchild, Peter Amato	August 1, 2020	
Netflix Selling Sunset	"Takin' On The World"	Shelly Fairchild, Peter Amato	August 3, 2020	
NBC The Titan Games	"No Holding Back"	Shelly Fairchild, Peter Amato, Matthew Gerard	August 6, 2020	
NBC The Titan Games	"Finish What I Started"	Shelly Fairchild, Peter Amato, Matthew Gerard	August 8, 2020	
NBC The Titan Games	"Til It's Over"	Shelly Fairchild, Peter Amato, Matthew Gerard	August 10, 2020	
NBC The Titan Games	"Last One Standing"	Shelly Fairchild, Peter Amato, Matthew Gerard	August 12, 2020	
USA Network Love Island	"Boss Behavior"	Shelly Fairchild, Peter Amato	October 1, 2020	
USA Network Love Island	"Final Hour"	Shelly Fairchild, Peter Amato	October 12, 2020	
Showtime (TV network) Shameless	"Takin Over (Come On, Come On)"	Shelly Fairchild, Kurt Goebel, Ellen Tift-Goebel	January 6, 2021	
Microsoft "International Women's Day Commercial"	"Made To Shine"	Shelly Fairchild, Joshua Silverberg	March 9, 2021	
MTV Younger season 7, episode 4	"Ready Right Now"	Shelly Fairchild, Nick Brophy, Jennifer Hanson	April 15, 2021	
MTV Siesta Key episode 404	"Wild Child"	Shelly Fairchild, Sam Tinnesz, Jeff Pardo	June 2, 2021	
MTV The Hills: New Beginnings episode 205	"Nothing Better"	Shelly Fairchild, Nick Brophy, Moe Loughran	June 16, 2021	
Netflix Selling Sunset episode 301	"Made To Shine"	Shelly Fairchild, Joshua Silverberg	July 6, 2021	
MTV The Hills: New Beginnings episode 208	"Here Comes Trouble"	Shelly Fairchild, Peter Amato, Robbie Neville	July 7, 2021	
Netflix Selling Sunset episode 306	"Here Comes Trouble"	Shelly Fairchild, Peter Amato, Robbie Neville	July 18, 2021	
Netflix Selling Sunset episode 306	"Nothing Better"	Shelly Fairchild, Nick Brophy, Moe Loughran	June 18, 2021	
MTV Siesta Key episode 412	"Takin Over (Come On, Come On)"	Shelly Fairchild, Kurt Goebel, Ellen Tift-Goebel	August 4, 2021	
Roswell, New Mexico episode 303	"One Mississippi"	Shelly Fairchild, Cade Doyle, Micheal Dale	August 9, 2021	
Fox Joe Millionaire: For Richer or Poorer episode 113	"Out Alive"	Shelly Fairchild, Peter Amato	August 18, 2022	

== Songwriting credits ==
Little Big Town – "Looking for a Reason" Maggie Rose – "Put Yourself in My Blues" Lee DeWyze – "Stay Away" Mindy McCready – "I Want to Love You" Kassie DePaiva – "I Want to Love You" Shelly Fairchild – "You Don't Lie Here Anymore" Shelly Fairchild – "Tiny Town"

== Background vocals ==
Eric Church – Creepin' Jason Aldean – Burnin' It Down Randy Rogers Band – "Kiss Me in the Dark", "Just a Matter of Time", "You Could Change My Mind", "Just Don't Tell Me the Truth" Ty Herndon – "World I'm Living In" Trace Adkins – "Jesus and Jones", "Cowboy's Back in Town" Terri Clark – "Longer" Ray Scott – "Train Wreck", "Doing Me Wrong" Chicago (band) – "Why Can't We" (lead and background)

== Discography ==
=== Studio albums ===
Title	Album details	Peak chart positions		
Title	Album details	US Country	US	US Heat
Ride	Release date: May 3, 2005; Label: Columbia Nashville	31	162	6
Ruby's Money	Release date: April 26, 2011; Label: Revelation Nation	—	—	—
Buffalo	Release date: December 2, 2016; Label: Independent	—	—	—
Sacred Southern Daughter	Release date: August 28, 2026; Label: Independent	—	—	—

=== Singles ===
Year	Single	Peak positions	Album
Year	Single	US Country	Album
2004	"You Don't Lie Here Anymore"	35	Ride
2005	"Tiny Town"	—	Ride
2005	"Kiss Me"	—	Ride
2008	"It's All Gonna Work Out"	—	We Are Enterprise
2017	"Mississippi Turnpike"	—	Buffalo
2026	"For the First Time"	—	Sacred Southern Daughter
2026	"End Up in Austin"	—	Sacred Southern Daughter

=== Music videos ===
Year	Video	Director
2004	"You Don't Lie Here Anymore"	Kristin Barlowe
2005	"Tiny Town"	Trey Fanjoy
2017	"Mississippi Turnpike"	Roger Pistole
