= The Notorious Cherry Bombs (album) =

Studio album by The Notorious Cherry Bombs
- Released: July 27, 2004
- Genre: Country
- Label: Universal South
- Producer: The Notorious Cherry Bombs

Professional ratings
Review scores
Source	Rating
Allmusic	4/5 stars

The Notorious Cherry Bombs is the only studio album by the American country music group The Notorious Cherry Bombs, a band that formerly served as country singer Rodney Crowell's backing band in the 1980s. This is the band's only studio album, with Crowell and Vince Gill alternating as lead vocalists. Released in 2004 on Universal South Records, the album produced one chart single in "It's Hard to Kiss the Lips at Night That Chew Your Ass Out All Day Long". "Making Memories of Us" was previously recorded by Tracy Byrd on his 2003 album The Truth About Men, and later in 2004 by Keith Urban on his album Be Here; Urban's rendition was released as a single, reaching Number One on the country charts in 2005.

== Track listing ==
1. "Let It Roll, Let It Ride" (Rodney Crowell, Vince Gill) – 3:53
2. "If I Ever Break Your Heart" (Crowell) – 3:25
3. "Wait a Minute" (Crowell, Hank DeVito) – 2:49
4. "Making Memories of Us" (Crowell) – 4:05
5. "Oklahoma Dust" (Gill, Leslie Satcher) – 2:35
6. "Dangerous Curves" (Crowell, Gill) – 4:21
7. "Forever Someday" (Gill) – 3:32
8. "On the Road to Ruin" (Crowell) – 3:27
9. "Heart of a Jealous Man" (Gill, Max D. Barnes) – 4:02
10. "It's Hard to Kiss the Lips at Night That Chew Your Ass Out All Day Long" (Crowell, Gill) – 4:24
11. "Sweet Little Lisa" (DeVito, Donivan Cowart, Walter Cowart) – 2:44
12. "Let It Roll, Let It Ride" (reprise) (Crowell, Gill) – 7:09^{A}

^{A}Track 12 includes an alternate version of "It's Hard to Kiss the Lips at Night That Chew Your Ass Out All Day Long" as a hidden track.

== Personnel ==
=== The Notorious Cherry Bombs ===
- Eddie Bayers – drums, percussion, background vocals
- Richard Bennett – acoustic guitar, electric guitar, bouzouki, cavaquinho, six-string bass guitar
- Tony Brown – piano, keyboards, "preaching"
- Rodney Crowell – acoustic guitar, "faux steel guitar", lead vocals, background vocals
- Hank DeVito – acoustic guitar, steel guitar, Dobro, background vocals
- Vince Gill – acoustic guitar, electric guitar, mandolin, banjo, Dobro, lead vocals, background vocals
- John Hobbs – piano, keyboards, organ, background vocals
- Michael Rhodes – bass guitar, background vocals

=== Additional musicians ===
- Jenny Gill – background vocals on "Dangerous Curves"
- Steve Herman – trumpet
- Jim Horn – tenor saxophone, baritone saxophone
- Larrie Londin – drums on "Let It Roll, Let It Ride (Reprise)"
- Mike Porter – tambourine on "Let It Roll, Let It Ride (Reprise)"

=== Technical ===
- Donivan Cowart – recording
- Steve Marcantonio – recording, mixing
- The Notorious Cherry Bombs – production
- Hank Williams – mastering

== Chart performance ==
Chart (2004)	Peak position
U.S. Billboard Top Country Albums	23
U.S. Billboard 200	135
U.S. Billboard Top Heatseekers	4
