= I Love My Life (Jamie O'Neal song) =

Single by Jamie O'Neal

from the album Brave
- Released: November 28, 2005
- Genre: Country
- Length: 2:56
- Label: Capitol Nashville
- Songwriter(s): Jamie O'Neal; Tim Nichols; Shaye Smith
- Producer(s): Keith Stegall

Jamie O'Neal singles chronology
"Somebody's Hero" (2005)	"I Love My Life" (2005)	"God Don't Make Mistakes" (2007)

"I Love My Life" is a song by Australian country music artist Jamie O'Neal, recorded for her second studio album Brave (2005). It was written by O'Neal, Tim Nichols, and Shaye Smith and produced by Keith Stegall. It was released on November 28, 2005, as the third and final single from the album.

It was a moderate hit, reaching number 26 on the US Hot Country Songs chart. It is also her last US country top 40 hit to date.

== Content ==
O'Neal said about the song: "That song, to me, says it all. That's why I wanted to end the album with it. This song is so me and basically tells our story. It also means a lot to me because my baby girl's on there counting it off and my little dog's barking at the end."

== Charts ==
=== Weekly charts ===
Chart (2005–2006)	Peak position
US Hot Country Songs (Billboard)	26

=== Year end charts ===
Chart (2006)	Position
US Country (Radio & Records)	97

== Release history ==
Release dates and format(s) for "I Love My Life"
Region	Date	Format(s)	Label(s)	Ref.
United States	November 28, 2005	Country radio	Capitol Nashville	
