= My Kind of Music (Ray Scott album) =

Studio album by Ray Scott
- Released: November 22, 2005
- Genre: Country
- Length: 45:42
- Label: Warner Bros.
- Producer: Buddy Cannon; Phillip Moore

Ray Scott chronology
My Kind of Music (2005)	Crazy Like Me (2008)

My Kind of Music is the debut studio album by American country music singer Ray Scott. It was released in 2005 via Warner Bros. Records. The album includes the singles "My Kind of Music", "Gone Either Way" and "I Didn't Come Here to Talk".

== Critical reception ==
Stephen Thomas Erlewine of Allmusic gave the album four-and-a-half stars, praising Scott's outlaw country influences and the "wry humor". He called the title track "very funny [and] very appealing". Country Standard Time reviewer Michael Sudhalter made a similar comparison to outlaw country. Giving it a "B", Chris Willman of Entertainment Weekly said that Scott "has an old-school baritone and classic country cockiness". Ray Waddell of Billboard gave a mixed review. He wrote that Scott "offers some much-needed Music Row testosterone on ballads like 'I Didn't Come Here to Talk'" and said that Scott sings "more than capably", but thought that Scott was trying to establish credibility by name-dropping on the title track.

== Track listing ==
No.	Title	Writer(s)	Length
1.	"Gone Either Way"	Ray Scott, Phillip Moore, John Boblinger	2:54
2.	"Makin' My Way"	Scott, Moore, A. J. Masters	3:30
3.	"Different Kind of Cowboy"	Scott, Moore, Jess Brown	3:27
4.	"Walls"	Scott, Moore, Steve Wariner	3:33
5.	"My Kind of Music"	Scott	2:59
6.	"Plowboy"	Scott	4:37
7.	"I Didn't Come Here to Talk"	Scott, Moore	3:39
8.	"Dirty Shirt"	Scott, Moore	3:08
9.	"Time"	Scott	3:27
10.	"Rats Don't Race"	Scott, Moore, Adam Wheeler	2:44
11.	"Fly with an Angel"	Scott, Moore	3:14
12.	"Gypsy"	Scott	4:49
13.	"Bear with Me Lord"	Scott, Moore	3:41

== Personnel ==
- Eddie Bayers- drums, percussion
- Barry Beckett- Hammond organ, Wurlitzer
- John Boblinger- acoustic guitar
- Mike Brignardello- bass guitar
- Pat Buchanan- electric guitar, harmonica
- Buddy Cannon- baritone guitar, background vocals
- Jack Clement- acoustic guitar
- Dan Dugmore- acoustic guitar, electric guitar, steel guitar, slide guitar
- Kevin "Swine" Grantt- bass guitar
- Rob Hajacos- fiddle
- John Hobbs- keyboards, Hammond organ, piano
- Angela Hurt- background vocals
- Doug Kahan- bass guitar
- Troy Lancaster- electric guitar
- A.J. Masters- bass guitar, acoustic guitar
- Randy McCormick- Hammond organ, piano
- Phillip Moore- acoustic guitar, electric guitar
- Greg Morrow- drums, percussion
- Larry Paxton- bass guitar
- Mickey Raphael- harmonica
- Michael Rhodes- bass guitar
- Paul Scholten- drums, percussion
- Ray Scott- lead vocals, background vocals
- Robby Turner- steel guitar
- Steve Wariner- electric guitar
- Jonathan Yudkin- fiddle

== Chart performance ==
=== Album ===
Chart (2005–2006)	Peak position
U.S. Billboard Top Heatseekers	4
U.S. Billboard Top Country Albums	39

=== Singles ===
Year	Single	Peak positions
Year	Single	US Country
2005	"My Kind of Music"	37
2006	"Gone Either Way"	53
2006	"I Didn't Come Here to Talk"	—
