= The Notorious Cherry Bombs =

US musical group

- Also known as: The Cherry Bombs
- Origin: U.S.
- Genre: Country
- Years active: 1980–1988; 2003–2004
- Label: Universal South
- Spinoff of: The Hot Band
- Past members: Eddie Bayers; Richard Bennett; Tony Brown; Rodney Crowell; Hank DeVito; Vince Gill; Emory Gordy Jr. John Hobbs; Larrie Londin; Michael Rhodes

The Notorious Cherry Bombs, originally called the Cherry Bombs, was an American country music supergroup founded by singer-songwriter Rodney Crowell in 1980. A former member of Emmylou Harris's Hot Band, Crowell picked several former Hot Band members as his backing band, which he named The Cherry Bombs. They made their debut as Rodney's backing band on his 1980 album But What Will the Neighbors Think.

Although they served as Crowell's backing band for several years, the Cherry Bombs did not record an album of their own until a 2004 reunion (at which point "Notorious" had been added to the band's name). The album, also titled The Notorious Cherry Bombs, produced a hit on the country music charts in "It's Hard to Kiss the Lips at Night That Chew Your Ass Out All Day Long".

== The Cherry Bombs ==
Rodney Crowell was a founding member of country singer Emmylou Harris's Hot Band; when he began his own solo career in the early 1980s, Crowell picked several former Hot Band members as his backing band, whom he named the Cherry Bombs. The initial members comprised Vince Gill (background vocals, electric guitar), Hank DeVito (steel guitar), Emory Gordy Jr. (bass guitar), Richard Bennett (electric guitar), Tony Brown (keyboards), and Larrie Londin (drums).

As the Cherry Bombs, the band backed both Crowell and Rosanne Cash, to whom Crowell was married at the time. After Crowell and Cash divorced, the band's members began leaving. Gill began a solo career in country music in the late 1980s, while Brown became a record producer for MCA Records. Londin died from a heart attack in 1992. Gordy married country singer Patty Loveless and served as her producer, while Bennett and DeVito found work as studio musicians.

== Return as the Notorious Cherry Bombs ==
In 2003, several of the former members of the Cherry Bombs, including Gill and Crowell, re-united. Emory Gordy Jr. opted not to participate in the reunited group, which by then comprised Eddie Bayers (drums), Richard Bennett (electric guitar, bouzouki, cavaquinho), Hank DeVito (steel guitar, Dobro), Tony Brown (piano, keyboards), John Hobbs (piano, keyboards), and Michael Rhodes (bass guitar), with Gill and Crowell alternating as lead singers. A year later, the band was signed to a record deal with Universal South Records to record their first album as an actual band. Due to legal concerns, the band was renamed the Notorious Cherry Bombs. Their self-titled album produced a minor hit on the Billboard Hot Country Singles & Tracks chart that year with "It's Hard to Kiss the Lips at Night That Chew Your Ass Out All Day Long". This was followed by "Let It Roll, Let It Ride" which failed to chart. Also included on the album was "Making Memories of Us", which had previously been recorded by Tracy Byrd and would later become a number one hit when Keith Urban released his own version in 2005. After the release of their second single, the Notorious Cherry Bombs disbanded again, and Crowell and Gill resumed their solo careers.

== Discography ==
=== Studio albums ===
Title	Album details	Peak chart positions		
Title	Album details	US Country	US	US Heat
The Notorious Cherry Bombs	Release date: July 27, 2004; Label: Universal South Records	23	135	4

=== Singles ===
Year	Single	Peak positions	Album
Year	Single	US Country	Album
2004	"It's Hard to Kiss the Lips at Night That Chew Your Ass Out All Day Long"	47	The Notorious Cherry Bombs
2005	"Let It Roll, Let It Ride"	—	The Notorious Cherry Bombs
"—" denotes releases that did not chart

=== Music videos ===
Year	Video	Director
2004	"It's Hard to Kiss the Lips at Night That Chew Your Ass Out All Day Long"	Eric Welch

== Awards ==
Year	Association	Category	Nominated work	Result
2004	Grammy Awards	Grammy Award for Best Country Song	"It's Hard to Kiss the Lips at Night That Chew Your Ass Out All Day Long"	Nominated
2004	Grammy Awards	Grammy Award for Best Country Performance by a Duo or Group with Vocal	"It's Hard to Kiss the Lips at Night That Chew Your Ass Out All Day Long"	Nominated
