= Honkytonk U =

Single by Toby Keith

from the album Honkytonk University
- Released: February 7, 2005
- Recorded: January 19, 2005
- Genre: Country
- Length: 3:35
- Label: DreamWorks Nashville
- Songwriter: Toby Keith
- Producers: James Stroud; Toby Keith

Toby Keith singles chronology
"Mockingbird" (2004)	"Honkytonk U" (2005)	"As Good as I Once Was" (2005)

"Honkytonk U" is a song written and recorded by American country music artist Toby Keith. It was released on February 7, 2005, as the lead-off single and title track from his 2005 album Honkytonk University. The song peaked at number 8 in the United States, and it reached number 6 in Canada.

== Content ==
The song describes Keith's past and early career stages, and when he used to go to his grandmother's nightclub every summer and work until late at night when he got to sit with the band.

== Critical reception ==
Kevin John Coyne, reviewing the song for Country Universe, gave it a negative rating. He summed up his review by stating that this song is an example of why Keith doesn't win Grammy Awards.

== Music video ==
The music video was directed by Michael Salomon, and premiered on CMT on February 12, 2005. The video begins in 1972, where Keith works at his grandmother's nightclub in Fort Smith, Arkansas when he was a child, and the nightclub was called Billie's. Then, it cuts to Keith performing in the present day (2005), showing photographs of Keith in his younger days, and showing footage of Keith in Baghdad. This video is dedicated to Keith's grandmother, who died in 2005.

== Chart positions ==
"Honkytonk U" debuted at number 30 on the U.S. Billboard Hot Country Singles & Tracks for the week of February 12, 2005.

Chart (2005)	Peak position
Canada Country (Radio & Records)	6
US Hot Country Songs (Billboard)	8
US Billboard Hot 100	61

=== Year-end charts ===
Chart (2005)	Position
US Country Songs (Billboard)	46
