= Somebody's Hero (song) =

Single by Jamie O'Neal

from the album Brave
- Released: April 4, 2005
- Genre: Country
- Length: 3:40
- Label: Capitol Nashville
- Songwriters: Jamie O'Neal; Shaye Smith; Ed Hill
- Producer: Keith Stegall

Jamie O'Neal singles chronology
"Trying to Find Atlantis" (2004)	"Somebody's Hero" (2005)	"I Love My Life" (2005)

"Somebody's Hero" is a song co-written and recorded by Australian country music artist Jamie O'Neal. It was released in April 2005 as the second single from her album Brave. It peaked at number 3 on the Hot Country Songs chart, giving O'Neal her sixth Top 40 country hit, and her third top ten hit. The song was written by O'Neal, Ed Hill and Shaye Smith.

== Background and writing ==
According to the rear cover of the CD single, O'Neal said, "I had been saying to all my co-writers, 'I really want to write about family. I really want to write about my little girl.' The Thing for me was, when you have a baby you start thinking about your own relationship with your mother, and when you were little, how much you looked up to her. Then you move to, 'Gosh, my baby looks up to me so much. I don't want to let her down. I want to be a hero to her.' Then you start thinking it's not just your mother, but about the other generations of women. My grandmother-I was close to her before she passed away. I think this song is a real tribute to the women in my life."

== Music video ==
This video was directed by Trey Fanjoy, who also directed her videos for "When I Think About Angels," and "Like A Woman." O'Neal's daughter made a cameo appearance in the clip. For each character, they used different people to show the mother, and daughter at different ages.

== Chart performance ==
"Somebody's Hero" debuted at number 49 on the U.S. Billboard Hot Country Songs for the week of April 1, 2005.

Chart (2005)	Peak position
Canada Country (Radio & Records)	3
US Hot Country Songs (Billboard)	3
US Billboard Hot 100	51

=== Year-end charts ===
Chart (2005)	Position
US Country Songs (Billboard)	23
