= Tonight I Wanna Cry =

Single by Keith Urban

from the album Be Here
- Released: 21 November 2005
- Recorded: 2004
- Genre: Country; country pop
- Length: 4:19
- Label: Capitol Nashville
- Songwriters: Monty Powell; Keith Urban
- Producers: Dann Huff; Keith Urban

Keith Urban singles chronology
"Better Life" (2005)	"Tonight I Wanna Cry" (2005)	"Once in a Lifetime" (2006)

"Tonight I Wanna Cry" is a song co-written and recorded by Australian country music artist Keith Urban. It was released in November 2005 as the fifth and final single from his 2004 album Be Here. The song peaked at number 2 on the U.S. Billboard Hot Country Songs chart. Urban wrote this song with Monty Powell.

== Music video ==
The accompanying music video for this song was directed by Chris Hicky and premiered in early 2006.

== In popular culture ==
The song was later sung by Ace Young on American Idol on 4 April 2006, which was designated a country music theme. Chad Doucette sang it on Canadian Idol. It was also covered by Chris Richardson on American Idol on 6 March 2007

Urban's version was also featured in the 31 January 2007 Medium episode, Very Merry Maggie.

In August 2011, The song was performed on the X Factor by contestant, Mitchell Callaway. Following this performance, Keith's version entered the Australian singles chart at #72.

In February 2013, The song was also performed on "American Idol" by Paul Jolley and Lazaro Arbos in front of Keith Urban himself during the "Sudden Death Round" in Las Vegas.

== Chart performance ==
"Tonight I Wanna Cry" debuted at number 42 on the U.S. Billboard Hot Country Songs chart for the week of 3 December 2005.

=== Weekly charts ===
Chart (2005–2006)	Peak position
Canada Country (Radio & Records)	2
US Billboard Hot 100	36
US Hot Country Songs (Billboard)	2
Chart (2011)	Peak position
Australia (ARIA)	72

=== Year-end charts ===
Chart (2006)	Position
US Country Songs (Billboard)	7

== Certifications and sales ==
Region	Certification	Certified units/sales
Australia (ARIA)	Gold	35,000^{‡}
United States (RIAA)	Platinum	1,000,000^{‡}
^{‡} Sales+streaming figures based on certification alone.
