= Ray Scott (singer) =

American singer

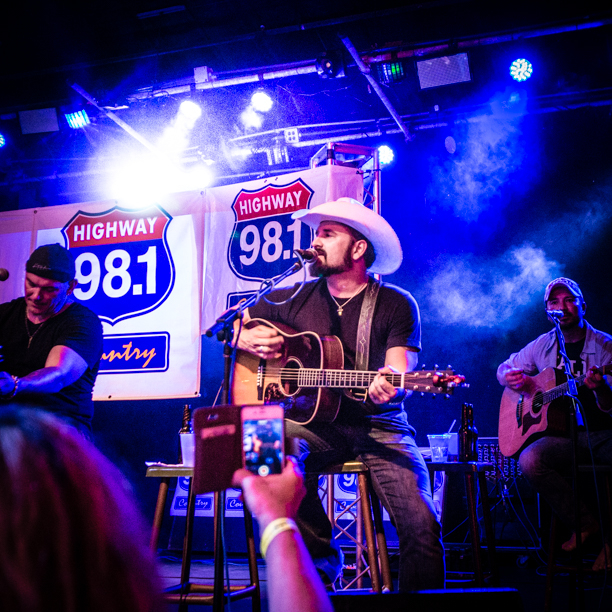
- Ray Scott at Toe Jam in Destin, Florida, August 27, 2014

Background information
- Born: Carlton Ray Scott Jr. December 5, 1969 (age 56)
- Origin: Semora, North Carolina, United States
- Genre: Country
- Occupation: Singer-songwriter
- Instruments: Vocals, acoustic guitar
- Years active: 2003–present
- Labels: Decibel Nashville, Warner Bros. Nashville, Jethropolitan
- Website: http://www.rayscott.com

Carlton Ray Scott Jr. (born December 5, 1969, in Semora, North Carolina) is an American country music artist. He first gained attention in 2005 with his debut album My Kind of Music, and has since released six albums and two EPS.

== Career ==
Scott has a distinctive southern voice and wears a cowboy hat. Warner Brothers released his debut album, My Kind of Music, and its title track became a top 40 single in 2005.

Scott split from the Warner Brothers label two years later. He independently released Crazy Like Me (2008) and Rayality (2011), which gave him a physical product on the road and support from SiriusXM. "Drinkin Beer" and "Ain’t Always Thirsty" received Sirius airplay, as did one of his best-known singles: "Those Jeans" from the Rayality album, produced by Dave Brainard (Jerrod Neimann, Brandy Clark). Then came his 5th studio album in 2017 — Guitar for Sale, produced by Michael Hughes.

Hughes and Scott paired up again for Honky Tonk Heart, an EP released on March 1, 2019. According to Scott, ""Honky Tonk Heart" is all about who I am, and it's an ode to all the troubadours out there runnin' up and down the highways keeping real country music alive because they love it, live it, and breathe it."

Scott's second EP, Nowhere Near Done, was released in February 2020.

== Discography ==
=== Studio albums ===
Title	Album details	Peak chart positions			Sales
Title	Album details	US Country	US Heat	US Indie	Sales
My Kind of Music	Release date: November 22, 2005; Label: Warner Bros. Nashville	39	4	—	
Crazy Like Me	Release date: June 3, 2008; Label: Jethropolitan	—	—	—	
Rayality	Release date: September 16, 2011; Label: Jethropolitan	—	—	—	
Ray Scott	Release date: October 10, 2014; Label: Jethropolitan	—	—	—	
Guitar for Sale	Release date: June 9, 2017; Label: Jethropolitan	—	12	28	US: 1,500
Cover The Earth	Release date: September 17, 2021; Label: Jethropolitan	—	—	—	
Billboards & Brake Lights	Release date: November 10, 2023; Label: Jethropolitan	—	—	—	
"—" denotes releases that did not chart

=== EPs ===
Title	Album details	Peak chart positions		Sales
Title	Album details	US Heat	US Indie	Sales
Honky Tonk Heart	Release date: March 1, 2019; Label: Jethropolitan	19	39	
Nowhere Near Done	Release date: Early 2020; Label: Jethropolitan	—	—	US: 100
"—" denotes releases that did not chart

=== Singles ===
Year	Single	Peak positions	Album
Year	Single	US Country	Album
2005	"My Kind of Music"	39	My Kind of Music
2006	"Gone Either Way"	53	My Kind of Music
2006	"I Didn't Come Here to Talk"	—	My Kind of Music
2008	"Sometimes the Bottle Hits You Back"	—	Crazy Like Me
2012	"Those Jeans"	—	Rayality
2014	"What Works for Willie"	—	Rayality (Deluxe)
2014	"Drinkin' Beer"	—	Ray Scott
2015	"Ain't Always Thirsty"	—	Ray Scott
2017	"Livin' This Way"	—	Guitar For Sale
2019	"Honky Tonk Heart"	—	Honky Tonk Heart
2022	"Santa's Sack"	—	N/A
"—" denotes releases that did not chart

=== Music videos ===
Year	Video	Director
2005	"My Kind of Music"	Shaun Silva
2012	"Those Jeans"	Marcel
2014	"Drinkin' Beer"	Sam White
2015	"Ain't Always Thirsty"	Blake Judd
2016	"High Road"	
2022	"Santa's Sack"	
