= Eddie Bayers =

American session drummer (born 1949)

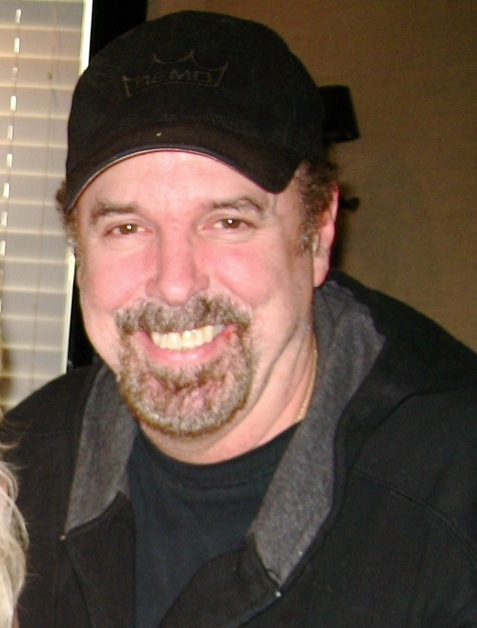
- Bayers in 2008

Background information
- Born: January 28, 1949 (age 77)
- Origin: Patuxent, Maryland, U.S.
- Genres: Country
- Occupation: Session musician
- Instrument: Drums
- Years active: 1968—present
- Formerly of: The Players, The Notorious Cherry Bombs
- Website: eddiebayers.com

Eddie Bayers (born January 28, 1949) is an American session drummer who has played on 300 gold and platinum albums. He received the Academy of Country Music 'Drummer of the Year Award' for fourteen years, has three times won the Nashville Music Awards 'Drummer of the Year,' and was inducted into the Musicians Hall of Fame and Museum in 2019. He was also a member of two bands: The Players, and The Notorious Cherry Bombs. In 2022, Bayers was one of four inductees into the Country Music Hall of Fame along with Ray Charles, The Judds, and Pete Drake.

== Early life ==
The son of a career military man, Bayers moved around as a child, originally from Maryland then spending time in Nashville, North Africa, Oakland, and Philadelphia. His early musical training was as a classical pianist studying Bach, Beethoven, and Mozart. During his college years in Oakland, California he was a member of the Edwin Hawkins Singers and he also jammed with future stars Jerry Garcia, and Tom and John Fogerty and developed an appreciation for the creative aspects of music. After a short stint in a New Jersey show band he decided to move to Nashville.

== Session work ==
Arriving in Nashville in 1973, Bayers became the house keyboard player at the Carousel Club where he met drummer Larrie Londin who inspired him to take up drumming. His drumming was influenced by soul drummers such as Al Jackson, Jr. and Clyde Stubblefield. He became the staff drummer at Audio Media Studios along with guitarist Paul Worley, keyboardist Dennis Burnside, and bassist Jack Jackson. Some of the artists Bayers has worked with include Tanya Tucker, Mindy Smith, John Denver, Ricky Skaggs and George Strait. He has since worked with the likes of The Beach Boys, Garth Brooks, Glen Campbell, Kenny Chesney, Peter Frampton, Vince Gill, Rebecca Lynn Howard, Lane Brody, Julio Iglesias, Alan Jackson, Elton John, Mark Knopfler, Uncle Kracker, Bob Seger, Sting, Steve Winwood, and Trisha Yearwood. He also co- produced Rosanne Cash's album Interiors, A Glen Campbell Christmas, and the soundtrack for A Thing Called Love.

== Bands ==
=== The Players ===
In 2002, Bayers formed a band, The Players, with fellow studio musicians Brent Mason, Paul Franklin, John Hobbs, Michael Rhodes. The group released a live DVD, Live in Nashville, featuring their own performances along with guest appearances by Peter Frampton, Shawn Colvin, Travis Tritt, Vince Gill, and Jim Horn.

=== The Notorious Cherry Bombs ===
Bayers replaced his former mentor, drummer Larrie Londin, in a reunited Notorious Cherry Bombs for a 2003 ASCAP Country Awards dinner. The band decided to stay together and has released The Notorious Cherry Bombs which was nominated for Grammies in both the 'Best Country Performance By A Duo Or Group With Vocal' and 'Best Country Song' categories. Along with Bayers the band consists of Vince Gill, Rodney Crowell, Hank DeVito, Richard Bennett, and Michael Rhodes.

=== The Medallion Band ===
An all-star lineup was assembled to be the backing band at the 2010 Country Music Hall of Fame induction ceremony dubbed the Medallion Band. Bayers served as drummer and was accompanied by keyboardist and music director John Hobbs, pedal steel player Paul Franklin, electric guitarist Steve Gibson, bassist Michael Rhodes, fiddler Deanie Richardson, tuba player Larry Paxton, background vocalists Dawn Sears and Jeff White, and acoustic guitarist Biff Watson. Later that year Bayers and a slightly revamped Medallion Band accompanied Shawn Camp in honoring Hall of Fame inductee Jimmy Dean. Bayers played the same role for the 2011 Country Music Hall of Fame induction ceremony with the band now dubbed the Medallion All-Stars.

== Accolades ==
Eddie Bayers was inducted into the Musicians Hall of Fame and Museum in 2019. Bayers received the 'Academy of Country Music Drummer of the Year Award' 14 times, 'Nashville Music Awards Drummer of the Year' three times, and one of the 10 greatest session drummers of all time by Drum! magazine. He has been nominated for the 'CMA Musician of the Year' ten times but has yet to bring home the prize. On May 1, 2022, he was inducted into the Country Music Hall of Fame.

== Music industry ==
In addition to his work as a musician, Bayers has contributed to the recording industry as a 12-year member of the Board of Governors for NARAS. He is also the part-owner of the Money Pit recording studio. The No. 1 singles "What I Really Meant to Say" by Cyndi Thomson and "Blessed" by Martina McBride were both recorded at his studio.

== Selected discography ==
Year	Artist/Band	Album	Contribution	RIAA Certification
1968	Smoke	Smoke	keyboards	
1979	George Jones	My Very Special Guests	drums	
1980	Dolly Parton	9 to 5 and Odd Jobs	drums	gold
1981	John Denver	Some Days Are Diamonds	drums	gold
1982	Ricky Skaggs	Highways & Heartaches	percussion	platinum
1984	George Strait	Does Fort Worth Ever Cross Your Mind	drums	platinum
1984	Reba McEntire	My Kind of Country	drums	gold
1987	Rosanne Cash	King's Record Shop	drums	gold
1987	Tanya Tucker	Love Me Like You Used To	drums	gold
1990	Rosanne Cash	Interiors	drums, producer	
1990	Steve Winwood	Refugees of the Heart	drums	gold
1990	Delbert McClinton	I'm With You	drums	
1991	Trisha Yearwood	Trisha Yearwood	drums	2× platinum
1993	Elton John	Duets	drums	platinum
1993	Clay Walker	Clay Walker	drums	platinum
1994	Julio Iglesias	Crazy	drums	gold
1995	Bob Seger	It's a Mystery	drums	gold
1996	Mark Knopfler	Golden Heart	drums	
1999	Garth Brooks	In the Life of Chris Gaines	drums	2× platinum
1999	Glen Campbell	A Glen Campbell Christmas	percussion, producer	
2004	The Players	Live in Nashville DVD	drums	
2004	The Notorious Cherry Bombs	The Notorious Cherry Bombs	drums	
2008	Elvis Presley	Christmas Duets	drums	
