= Big Blue Note =

Single by Toby Keith

from the album Honkytonk University
- Released: September 5, 2005
- Recorded: 2004–2005
- Genre: Country
- Length: 2:58
- Label: DreamWorks Nashville/Show Dog Nashville
- Songwriters: Toby Keith; Scotty Emerick
- Producers: James Stroud, Toby Keith

Toby Keith singles chronology
"As Good as I Once Was" (2005)	"Big Blue Note" (2005)	"Get Drunk and Be Somebody" (2005)

"Big Blue Note" is a song co-written and recorded by American country music artist Toby Keith. It was released in September 2005 as the third and final single from Keith's album Honkytonk University. It peaked at number 5 on the United States country charts. It is also Keith's final release through DreamWorks Records, as the label closed its doors before the song's release as a single. Keith wrote the song with Scotty Emerick.

== Music video ==
The music video was directed by Michael Salomon, and premiered on CMT on September 12, 2005. It begins on a rainy day where a businessman had a good life, until his wife ran away with a "big blue note" on the floor. The video shows him having trouble getting rid of the note, but being unable to let go of her memory. Because of this, he is having trouble focusing at work, and an inkblot test at his psychiatrist shows up. Leading to him running a cliffside, he is actually taking the big blue note by folding into a paper airplane, and throws the big blue note off the cliff. The scene switches from a rainy day to a bright sunny day, as the businessman plays the banjo on the cliff.

== Chart performance ==
"Big Blue Note" debuted at number 57 on the U.S. Billboard Hot Country Singles & Tracks for the week ending September 17, 2005.

Chart (2005)	Peak position
Canada Country (Radio & Records)	1
US Hot Country Songs (Billboard)	5
US Billboard Hot 100	55
