= You're My Better Half =

Single by Keith Urban

from the album Be Here
- Released: 25 October 2004
- Recorded: 2004
- Genre: Country
- Length: 4:12 (album version); 3:59 (radio edit)
- Label: Capitol Nashville
- Songwriters: Keith Urban; John Shanks
- Producers: Dann Huff; Keith Urban

Keith Urban singles chronology
"Days Go By" (2004)	"You're My Better Half" (2004)	"Making Memories of Us" (2005)

"You're My Better Half" is a song recorded by Australian country music artist Keith Urban and released in October 2004 as the second single from his 2004 album Be Here. Co-written by Urban and John Shanks, the song peaked at number 2 on the U.S. Billboard Hot Country Songs charts.

== Critical reception ==
Deborah Evans Price of Billboard magazine reviewed "You're My Better Half" favorably, calling the production "light and breezy." She goes on to call it an "engaging performance" and saying that the lyric "paints a sweet portrait of domestic bliss, the kind of love that makes it easier to endure a hard day at work because of the prize waiting at home."

== Music video ==
The music video, directed by Trey Fanjoy, premiered on CMT on October 29, 2004.

== Charts ==
"You're My Better Half" debuted at number 50 on the U.S. Billboard Hot Country Singles & Tracks chart for the week of 30 October 2004.

=== Weekly charts ===
Weekly chart performance for "You're My Better Half"
Chart (2004–2005)	Peak position
Australia (ARIA)	34
Canada Country (Radio & Records)	2
US Billboard Hot 100	33
US Hot Country Songs (Billboard)	2

=== Year-end charts ===
Year-end chart performance for "You're My Better Half"
Chart (2005)	Position
US Country Songs (Billboard)	15

== Certifications ==
Region	Certification	Certified units/sales
Australia (ARIA)	Gold	35,000^{‡}
United States (RIAA)	Gold	500,000^{‡}
^{‡} Sales+streaming figures based on certification alone.
