= Days Go By (Keith Urban song) =

Single by Keith Urban

from the album Be Here
- Released: 28 June 2004
- Recorded: 2004
- Genre: Country; country pop
- Length: 3:48
- Label: Capitol Nashville
- Songwriters: Monty Powell; Keith Urban
- Producers: Dann Huff; Keith Urban

Keith Urban singles chronology
"You'll Think of Me" (2004)	"Days Go By" (2004)	"You're My Better Half" (2004)

"Days Go By" is a song co-written and recorded by Australian country music singer Keith Urban. It was released on 28 June 2004, as the first single from his 2004 album Be Here. It became Urban's fifth number one single on the US Billboard Hot Country Songs chart in late-2004, spending a four-week stay at that position. Urban wrote this song with Monty Powell.

== Content ==
Starting with an acoustic guitar phrase and then built in D major around Urban's typical up-tempo banjo/mandolin-driven riffs with exuberant vocal yelps and electric guitar fills, the song's message is a variation on the carpe diem theme, as played off the song's title phrase.

== Music video ==
A portion of the song's music video shows Urban appearing to walk forwards, while everyone else about him is walking backwards. This segment was actually filmed in the opposite direction, with Urban walking backwards.

In another part of the video, Urban makes a hand gesture, holding it parallel to the ground while raising and lowering it in an undulating motion, illustrating the line "I can feel it flying like a hand out the window in the wind". This inspired a collaborative project in which Keith Urban fans videotaped themselves imitating the motion while doing purposeful things most often by visiting recognizable landmarks (such as the Washington Monument, Yellowstone National Park, The Parthenon) and the most modest places, like Paducah, Kentucky. A compilation containing those videos was seen on the large image wall backdrop as the song was performed during Keith Urban's 2007 Love, Pain & the Whole Crazy World Tour.

The video won the CMT Award for Best Video of 2005.

== Other performances ==
"Days Go By" is one of Urban's songs with the most pop and rock crossover appeal, and was featured in his sets at both the Live 8 concert in Philadelphia in 2005 and the Live Earth concert in New Jersey in 2007.

== Chart performance ==
On the US Billboard Hot Country Songs chart, the song reached number one and spent four consecutive weeks at that position until it was knocked off by "Suds in the Bucket" by Sara Evans.

=== Weekly charts ===
Weekly chart performance for "Days Go By"
Chart (2004)	Peak position
Australia (ARIA)	56
Canada Country (Radio & Records)	1
US Billboard Hot 100	31
US Hot Country Songs (Billboard)	1

=== Year-end charts ===
Year-end chart performance for "Days Go By"
Chart (2004)	Position
US Country Songs (Billboard)	10

== Certifications ==
Certifications for "Days Go By"
Region	Certification	Certified units/sales
Australia (ARIA)	2× Platinum	140,000^{‡}
United States (RIAA)	Platinum	1,000,000^{‡}
^{‡} Sales+streaming figures based on certification alone.
