= As Good as I Once Was =

Single by Toby Keith

from the album Honkytonk University
- Released: May 9, 2005
- Recorded: 2004–2005
- Genre: Country
- Length: 3:49
- Label: DreamWorks Nashville
- Songwriters: Toby Keith; Scotty Emerick
- Producers: James Stroud; Toby Keith

Toby Keith singles chronology
"Honkytonk U" (2005)	"As Good as I Once Was" (2005)	"Big Blue Note" (2005)

"As Good as I Once Was" is a song recorded by American country music singer Toby Keith. It was released in May 2005 as the second single from Keith's album Honkytonk University. Keith wrote the song with Scotty Emerick.

The song was later sampled on Riley Green's 2026 single "Think as You Drunk".

== Content ==
The narrator, a man approaching or in middle age and apparently sitting in a bar, is put into situations that test his masculinity. Having outlived his glory days, he insists he now is no longer "as good as [he] once was" in his younger days, but although he no longer has the stamina to do what he used to do all the time, he can still be "as good, once, as [he] ever was." Examples given include a set of twins who want to draw him into a threesome and a fight against two rednecks and a "big fat biker man" to bail his buddy, Dave, out of a botched pool hustle.

== Music video ==
The music video was directed by Michael Salomon and premiered on CMT on May 16, 2005. It follows the narrative of the song and features Annie Sorrell and Alicia Loren as the frisky twins. At the beginning of the video, Keith is sat at the bar where he meets Bobbie Jo who invites him "for a rodeo" with her twin sister Betty Lou. Then, Keith's best friend Dave gets into a fight with a "couple of redneck boys", the beer starts sloshing, causing the music to fail, Keith yells in slow motion before the chorus resumes. As he goes to help Dave, Keith gets punched in the face by a tall bouncer. In the next shot, Keith was in an ambulance with a broken nose, as well as an intravenous drip. At the end of the video, the ambulance drives off into the night.

== Critical reception ==
"As Good as I once Was" has since become one of Keith's signature songs, as well as one of his most successful. Matt Bjorke writing for About.com stated "the song is a good one, so good that it rivals anything off of Toby's "How Do You Like Me Now?!" album. It's a fun track about getting older, and how we don't have as much "energy" as we once had." Sputnik Music called it "a testament to how much old age sucks" while Allmusic declared the song was "wonderfully self-depreciating".

In 2026, Riley Green, Jessi Alexander, Erik Dylan, and Wyatt McCubbin wrote a song called "Think as You Drunk", with additional co-writers' credit given to Keith and Emerick for its interpolation of "As Good as I Once Was", with Keith's own vocal sampled at the end of the song. This song was released as the lead single from Green's 2026 album That's Just Me.

== Chart performance ==
"As Good as I Once Was" debuted at number 37 on the U.S. Billboard Hot Country Singles & Tracks for the week of May 21, 2005. The single peaked at number one on the Billboard Hot Country Songs chart for the week of July 23, 2005, staying for six weeks. This song and Keith's 2003 single "Beer for My Horses" are both his longest-running number one hits, each having spent six weeks at number one. Following Keith's death on February 5, 2024, the single would re-enter the Hot Country Songs chart at number 19 on the chart week dated February 17, 2024, being one of five Toby Keith songs to re-enter the chart that week.

The song was named BMI's Song of the Year for 2006.

2005 weekly chart performance for "As Good as I Once Was"
Chart (2005)	Peak position
Canada Country (Radio & Records)	2
US Hot Country Songs (Billboard)	1
US Billboard Hot 100	28

2024 weekly chart performance for "As Good as I Once Was"
Chart (2024)	Peak position
US Hot Country Songs (Billboard)	19

=== Year-end charts ===
Year-end chart performance for "As Good as I Once Was"
Chart (2005)	Position
US Billboard Hot 100	84
US Country Songs (Billboard)	2

== Certifications ==
Region	Certification	Certified units/sales
United States (RIAA)	3× Platinum	3,000,000^{‡}
^{‡} Sales+streaming figures based on certification alone.
