= Better Life =

Single by Keith Urban

from the album Be Here
- Released: 25 July 2005
- Recorded: 2004
- Genre: Country; bluegrass
- Length: 4:42 (album version); 3:49 (radio edit)
- Label: Capitol Nashville
- Songwriters: Richard Marx; Keith Urban
- Producers: Dann Huff; Keith Urban

Keith Urban singles chronology
"Making Memories of Us" (2005)	"Better Life" (2005)	"Tonight I Wanna Cry" (2005)

"Better Life" is a song co-written and recorded by Australian country music artist Keith Urban. It was released on 25 July 2005 as the fourth single from his 2004 album Be Here. The song became Urban's seventh number one hit on the U.S. Billboard Hot Country Songs chart and spent six weeks at that position. It also peaked at number 44 on the Billboard Hot 100. Urban wrote this song with Richard Marx.

== Content ==
The mid-to-uptempo song is driven by a chugging banjo part set against a distinctive drum pattern. The message of an optimistic future prevailing over current struggles pervades the lyrics, summarized by the chorus. Urban's electric guitar playing further decorates the song, especially in its outro.

== Music video ==
The accompanying music video for "Better Life" was directed by Chris Hicky. It shows Urban and his band performing the song in a Los Angeles culvert (filmed at the Los Angeles River bridge, where several music videos across many different music genres have been filmed at), intercut with scenes of a struggling young pair of lovers having their ups and downs and finally ending up in the culvert to watch Urban perform. In April 2006, Urban won the CMT Music Awards Video of the Year for the video. Urban closed that awards show with a live performance of the song, featuring a long interpolation of Bruce Springsteen's "The Rising" and backing vocals from a large choir consisting of displaced persons from the previous summer's Hurricane Katrina.

== Chart performance ==
"Better Life" debuted at number 43 on the U.S. Billboard Hot Country Songs chart for the week of 30 July 2005.

Chart (2005)	Peak position
Canada Country (Radio & Records)	1
US Billboard Hot 100	44
US Hot Country Songs (Billboard)	1

=== Year-end charts ===
Chart (2005)	Position
US Country Songs (Billboard)	29

== Certifications ==
Region	Certification	Certified units/sales
United States (RIAA)	Gold	500,000^{‡}
^{‡} Sales+streaming figures based on certification alone.
