= Making Memories of Us =

Single by Keith Urban

from the album Be Here
- Released: 21 March 2005
- Recorded: 2004
- Genre: Country
- Length: 4:11 (album version); 3:56 (radio edit)
- Label: Capitol Nashville
- Songwriter: Rodney Crowell
- Producers: Dann Huff; Keith Urban

Keith Urban singles chronology
"You're My Better Half" (2004)	"Making Memories of Us" (2005)	"Better Life" (2005)

"Making Memories of Us" is a song written by American country music artist Rodney Crowell that has been recorded by several artists. The first version was recorded by American country music artist Tracy Byrd on his 2003 album The Truth About Men. One year later, Crowell and Vince Gill recorded the song as former members of Crowell's backing band the Notorious Cherry Bombs, and was featured on their self-titled album.

The third version of this song was recorded by Australian country music artist Keith Urban on his 2004 album Be Here. Urban's rendition was released as the album's third single on 21 March 2005. His version also reached number one on the U.S. Billboard Hot Country Songs chart and held that position for five weeks.

== Music video ==
The black and white music video for Keith Urban's version of "Making Memories of Us" was directed by Chris Hicky and premiered on CMT on March 25, 2005.

== Chart performance ==
"Making Memories of Us" debuted at number 55 on the U.S. Billboard Hot Country Singles & Tracks chart for the week of March 19, 2005.

For the Hot Country Songs chart published 4 June 2005, the song's second week at No. 1, artists on the Capitol Nashville label held the No. 1 through No. 3 positions on the chart, making for only the third time in the chart's history that all three positions were held by acts on the same label. That week, Trace Adkins' "Songs About Me" was No. 2 and Dierks Bentley's "Lot of Leavin' Left to Do" was No. 3.

In addition, "Making Memories of Us" peaked at number 34 on the Billboard Hot 100 and at number 5 on the US Adult Contemporary chart.

=== Weekly charts ===
Weekly chart performance for "Making Memories of Us"
Chart (2005)	Peak position
Australia (ARIA)	54
Canada AC Top 30 (Radio & Records)	12
Canada Country (Radio & Records)	1
US Billboard Hot 100	34
US Adult Contemporary (Billboard)	5
US Adult Pop Airplay (Billboard)	22
US Hot Country Songs (Billboard)	1

=== Year-end charts ===
Year-end chart performance for "Making Memories of Us"
Chart (2005)	Position
US Country Songs (Billboard)	8
Chart (2006)	Position
US Adult Contemporary (Billboard)	10

== Certifications ==
Region	Certification	Certified units/sales
Australia (ARIA)	Platinum	70,000^{‡}
United States (RIAA)	Platinum	1,000,000^{‡}
^{‡} Sales+streaming figures based on certification alone.
