= Mark Wills discography =

Discography of American country singer

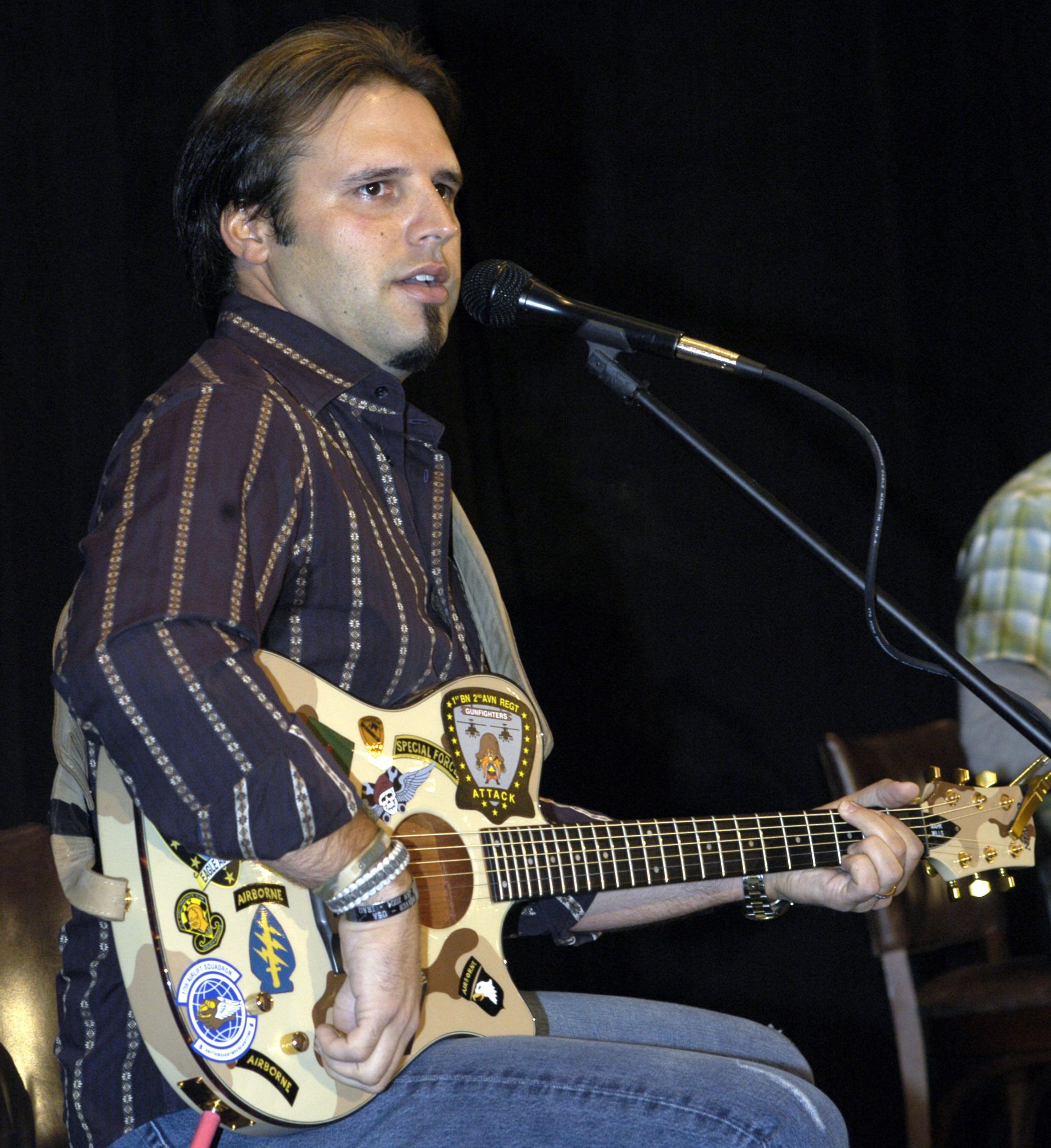
- Wills performing in 2005
- Studio albums: 7
- Live albums: 1
- Compilation albums: 5
- Singles: 24
- Music videos: 15
- No. 1 Singles: 3

Mark Wills is an American country music singer. His discography comprises six studio albums, five compilation albums, one live album, and twenty-four singles. Signed to Mercury Records Nashville in 1996, he has charted nineteen times on the Billboard Hot Country Songs charts (all 16 of his singles signed to Mercury Nashville making the top 40), reaching Number One with "Wish You Were Here" and "19 Somethin'," from 1999 and 2002-2003 respectively. Besides these two songs, he has sent six more into the top ten of the same chart: his 1996 debut single "Jacob's Ladder," 1997's "Places I've Never Been," "I Do (Cherish You)" and "Don't Laugh at Me" from 1998, "She's in Love" from 1999, and a cover version of Brian McKnight's "Back at One" in 2000. "Back at One" is also Wills' only Number One on the Canadian country singles charts.

Of his studio albums, 1998's Wish You Were Here is certified platinum by the Recording Industry Association of America (RIAA), and 2000's Permanently is certified gold. The latter is also his highest-charting album on Top Country Albums, at number 3.

== Studio albums ==
=== 1990s albums ===
Title	Album details	Peak chart positions			Certifications (sales thresholds)
Title	Album details	US Country	US	US Heat	Certifications (sales thresholds)
Mark Wills	Release date: June 11, 1996; Label: PolyGram/Mercury Records	38	—	26	
Wish You Were Here	Release date: May 5, 1998; Label: Mercury Nashville	8	74	1	US: Platinum
"—" denotes releases that did not chart

=== 2000s albums ===
Title	Album details	Peak chart positions		Certifications (sales thresholds)
Title	Album details	US Country	US	Certifications (sales thresholds)
Permanently^{[A]}	Release date: January 11, 2000; Label: Mercury Nashville	3	23	US: Gold
Loving Every Minute	Release date: August 21, 2001; Label: Mercury Nashville	10	93	
And the Crowd Goes Wild	Release date: October 21, 2003; Label: Mercury Nashville	5	68	
Familiar Stranger	Release date: November 4, 2008; Label: Tenacity Records	—	—	
"—" denotes releases that did not chart

=== 2010s albums ===
Title	Album details	Peak positions
Title	Album details	US Country
Looking for America	Release date: April 24, 2011; Label: Gracie Productions	55
The Legend Of...	Release date: April 26, 2011; Label: Three Kids Music (self-released)	-
19 Something	Release date: July 2, 2014; Label: Dance Plant Records	-

== Compilation albums ==
Title	Album details	Peak chart positions	
Title	Album details	US Country	US
Greatest Hits	Release date: November 5, 2002; Label: Mercury Nashville	16	140
The Best of Mark Wills	Release date: September 16, 2003; Label: Mercury Nashville	—	—
20th Century Masters: The Millennium Collection	Release date: March 9, 2004; Label: Mercury Nashville	—	—
Live at Billy Bob's Texas	Release date: June 28, 2005; Label: Smith Music Group	—	—
The Definitive Collection	Release date: March 13, 2007; Label: Mercury Nashville	—	—
2nd Time Around	Release date: June 16, 2009; Label: Tenacity Records	—	—
"—" denotes releases that did not chart

== Singles ==
=== 1990s ===
Year	Single	Peak chart positions			Album
Year	Single	US Country	US	CAN Country	Album
1996	"Jacob's Ladder"	6	—	6	Mark Wills
1996	"High Low and In Between"	33	—	48	Mark Wills
1997	"Places I've Never Been"	5	—	7	Mark Wills
1998	"I Do (Cherish You)"	2	72	3	Wish You Were Here
1998	"Don't Laugh at Me"	2	73	2	Wish You Were Here
1999	"Wish You Were Here"	1	34	4	Wish You Were Here
1999	"She's in Love"	7	60	18	Wish You Were Here
1999	"Back at One"	2	36	1	Permanently
"—" denotes releases that did not chart

=== 2000s and 2010s ===
Year	Single	Peak chart positions		Album
Year	Single	US Country	US	Album
2000	"Almost Doesn't Count"^{[B]}	19	—^{[C]}	Permanently
2000	"I Want to Know (Everything There Is to Know About You)"	33	—	Permanently
2001	"Loving Every Minute"	18	—^{[D]}	Loving Every Minute
2001	"I'm Not Gonna Do Anything Without You" (with Jamie O'Neal)	31	—	Loving Every Minute
2002	"19 Somethin'"	1	23	Greatest Hits
2003	"When You Think of Me"	28	—	Greatest Hits
2003	"And the Crowd Goes Wild"	29	—	And the Crowd Goes Wild
2003	"That's a Woman"	40	—	And the Crowd Goes Wild
2006	"Hank"	46	—	—N/a
2006	"Take It All Out on Me"	47	—	Familiar Stranger
2007	"Days of Thunder"	50	—	Familiar Stranger
2008	"The Things We Forget"	—	—	Familiar Stranger
2009	"Entertaining Angels"	—	—	Familiar Stranger
2009	"Crazy White Boy"	—	—	Familiar Stranger
2011	"Looking for America"	—	—	Looking for America
2011	"Crazy Being Home"	—	—	Looking for America
2016	"You're My Home" (featuring Beverley Mahood)	—	—	—N/a
"—" denotes releases that did not chart

== Other singles ==
=== Other charted songs ===
Year	Single	Peak positions	Album
Year	Single	US Digital	Album
2006	"What Hurts the Most"	51	And the Crowd Goes Wild

== Videography ==
=== Music videos ===
Year	Video	Director
1996	"High Low and in Between"	David Abbott
1997	"Places I've Never Been"	Steven Goldmann
1998	"I Do (Cherish You)"	Peter Zavadil
1998	"Don't Laugh at Me"	Jim Hershleder
1999	"She's in Love"	Charley Randazzo
1999	"Back at One"	Jim Hershleder
2000	"Almost Doesn't Count"	Michael Salomon
2000	"I Want to Know (Everything There Is to Know About You)"	David Abbott
2001	"Loving Every Minute"	Trey Fanjoy
2002	"19 Somethin'"	Eric Welch
2003	"And the Crowd Goes Wild"	Peter Zavadil
2006	"Hank"	
2008	"The Things We Forget"	Glenn Sweitzer
2009	"Crazy White Boy" (Version 1)	
2009	"Don't Laugh at Me" (Children's Miracle Network)	
2009	"Crazy White Boy" (Version 2) (featuring Chris Brackett)	
2011	"Looking for America"	Matt McQueen

== Notes ==
- A Permanently also peaked at number 8 on the RPM Country Albums chart.
- B "Almost Doesn't Count" also peaked at number 38 on the RPM Country Tracks chart.
- C "Almost Doesn't Count" did not enter the Hot 100, but peaked at number 6 on Bubbling Under Hot 100 Singles, which acts as a 25-song extension of the Hot 100.
- D "Loving Every Minute" did not enter the Hot 100, but peaked at number 7 on Bubbling Under Hot 100 Singles, which acts as a 25-song extension of the Hot 100.
