= Greatest Hits (Mark Wills album) =

Greatest hits album by Mark Wills
- Released: November 5, 2002
- Genre: Country
- Length: 42:19
- Label: Mercury Nashville
- Producer: Carson Chamberlain; Chris Lindsey; Keith Stegall; Mark Wills

Mark Wills chronology
Loving Every Minute (2001)	Greatest Hits (2002)	And the Crowd Goes Wild (2003)

Singles from Greatest Hits
- 1. "19 Somethin'" Released: September 23, 2002; 2. "When You Think of Me" Released: 2003

Professional ratings
Review scores
Source	Rating
Allmusic	link

Greatest Hits is the first compilation album by American country music artist Mark Wills. Released in 2002 on Mercury Nashville Records, it features the greatest hits from his first four studio albums: 1996's Mark Wills, 1998's Wish You Were Here, 2000's Permanently, and 2001's Loving Every Minute.

== Content ==
Two new tracks were also recorded for this compilation, both released as singles: "19 Somethin'" and "When You Think of Me". The former became his second number 1 hit on the Billboard Hot Country Singles & Tracks (now Hot Country Songs) charts, holding that position for six weeks, and his first since “Wish You Were Here” in 1999; "When You Think of Me" peaked at number 28 on the same chart. Wills produced these two tracks with Chris Lindsey.

The album itself peaked at number 16 on the Billboard Top Country Albums charts and number 140 on The Billboard 200.

== Track listing ==
No.	Title	Writer(s)	Length
1.	"Jacob's Ladder"	Cal Sweat, Brenda Sweat, Tony Martin	3:06
2.	"Places I've Never Been"	Martin, Reese Wilson, Aimee Mayo	3:37
3.	"I Do (Cherish You)"	Keith Stegall, Dan Hill	3:18
4.	"Don't Laugh at Me"	Steve Seskin, Allen Shamblin	3:37
5.	"Wish You Were Here"	Bill Anderson, Skip Ewing, Debbie Moore	4:01
6.	"She's in Love"	Stegall, Hill	4:43
7.	"Back at One"	Brian McKnight	4:07
8.	"Almost Doesn't Count"	Shelly Peiken, Guy Roche	3:41
9.	"I'm Not Gonna Do Anything Without You" (duet with Jamie O'Neal)	Randy VanWarmer, Rich Alves	4:27
10.	"19 Somethin'"	David Lee, Chris DuBois	3:20^{A}
11.	"When You Think of Me"	Brett James, Troy Verges	4:25^{A}

- ^{A}: Previously unreleased

== Personnel ==
The following musicians performed on the previously unreleased tracks "19 Somethin'" and "When You Think of Me".

- Tim Akers – keyboards
- Tom Bukovac – electric guitar on "When You Think of Me"
- J. T. Corenflos – electric guitar
- Eric Darken – percussion
- Aubrey Haynie – fiddle
- Wes Hightower – background vocals
- Jimmie Lee Sloas – bass guitar
- Biff Watson – acoustic guitar
- Mark Wills – lead vocals
- Lonnie Wilson – drums

Strings on "When You Think of Me" performed by the Nashville String Machine and arranged by Kris Wilkinson.

Tracks 1, 2, and 9 produced by Carson Chamberlain and Keith Stegall; tracks 3–8 produced by Carson Chamberlain; tracks 10 and 11 produced by Chris Lindsey and Mark Wills.

== Chart performance ==
=== Weekly charts ===
Chart (2002–03)	Peak position
US Billboard 200	140
US Top Country Albums (Billboard)	16

=== Year-end charts ===
Chart (2003)	Position
US Top Country Albums (Billboard)	41
