= 34th Academy of Country Music Awards =

US music awards ceremony in 1999

- Date: May 5, 1999
- Location: Universal Amphitheatre, Los Angeles, California
- Hosted by: No host

Highlights
- Most wins: Faith Hill (4)
- Most nominations: Faith Hill (6)

Television/radio coverage
- Network: CBS

The 34th Academy of Country Music Awards was held on May 5, 1999, at the Universal Amphitheatre, in Los Angeles, California . The ceremony was not hosted by anyone.

== Winners and nominees ==
Winners are shown in bold.

Entertainer of the Year	Album of the Year
**Garth Brooks**; Brooks & Dunn; Tim McGraw; George Strait; Shania Twain	**Wide Open Spaces — The Dixie Chicks**; Double Live — Garth Brooks; Faith — Faith Hill; I'm Alright — Jo Dee Messina; One Step at a Time — George Strait
Top Female Vocalist of the Year	Top Male Vocalist of the Year
**Faith Hill**; Martina McBride; Jo Dee Messina; Shania Twain; Trisha Yearwood	**Tim McGraw**; Garth Brooks; Vince Gill; Collin Raye; George Strait
Top Vocal Duo or Group of the Year	Top Vocal Event of the Year
**The Dixie Chicks**; Alabama; Brooks & Dunn; Sawyer Brown; The Wilkinsons	**"Just to Hear You Say That You Love Me"** — **Faith Hill (feat. Tim McGraw)**; "Burnin' the Roadhouse Down" — Steve Wariner (feat. Garth Brooks); "If You See Him/If You See Her" — Brooks & Dunn (feat. Reba McEntire); "No Place That Far" — Sara Evans (feat. Vince Gill); "Same Old Train" — Various Artists^{[A]}
Single Record of the Year	Song of the Year
**"This Kiss"** — **Faith Hill**; "26 Cents" — The Wilkinsons; "A Broken Wing" — Martina McBride; "Holes in the Floor of Heaven" — Steve Wariner; "You're Still the One" — Shania Twain	**"Holes in the Floor of Heaven"** — **Billy Kirsch, Steve Wariner**; "A Broken Wing" — James House, Sam Hogin, Phil Barnhart; "Don't Laugh at Me" — Steve Seskin, Allen Shamblin; "Husbands and Wives" — Roger Miller; "This Kiss" — Beth Nielsen Chapman, Robin Lerner, Annie Roboff
Top New Male Vocalist	Top New Female Vocalist
**Mark Wills**; Deryl Dodd; David Kersh	**Jo Dee Messina**; Sherrie Austin; Allison Moorer
Top New Vocal Duo or Group	Video of the Year
**The Dixie Chicks**; The Warren Brothers; The Wilkinsons	**"This Kiss"** — **Faith Hill**; "Drive Me Wild" — Sawyer Brown; "Getcha Some" — Toby Keith; "Holes in the Floor of Heaven" — Steve Wariner; "I'll Go On Loving You" — Alan Jackson
Artist of the Decade Award
**Garth Brooks**
Pioneer Award
**Glen Campbell**
Double Diamond Award
**Shania Twain**

^[A]Artists featured on the song "Same Old Train" include: Clint Black, Joe Diffie, Merle Haggard, Emmylou Harris, Alison Krauss, Patty Loveless, Earl Scruggs, Ricky Skaggs, Marty Stuart, Pam Tillis, Randy Travis, Travis Tritt and Dwight Yoakam

== Performers ==
Performer(s)	Song(s)
Sawyer Brown	"Drive Me Wild"
Tim McGraw	"Please Remember Me"
The Dixie Chicks; The Warren Brothers; The Wilkinsons	Top New Vocal Duo or Group Medley "There's Your Trouble" "She Wants to Rock" "Boy, Oh Boy"
Jo Dee Messina	"Stand Beside Me"
Brooks & Dunn	"South of Santa Fe"
Trisha Yearwood	"I'll Still Love You More"
Kenny Chesney	"How Forever Feels"
The Dixie Chicks	"You Were Mine"
Sherrie Austin; Jo Dee Messina; Allison Moorer	Top New Female Vocalist Medley "Never Been Kissed" "I'm Alright" "A Soft Place to Fall"
Steve Wariner	"Two Teardrops"
Faith Hill	"Let Me Let Go"
Deryl Dodd; David Kersh; Mark Wills	Top New Male Vocalist Medley "A Bitter End" "If I Never Stop Loving You" "Wish You Were Here"
Martina McBride	"Whatever You Say"
Reba McEntire	"One Honest Heart"
Garth Brooks	"To Make You Feel My Love"
Clay Walker	"Cold Hearted"
Trace Adkins; Ty Herndon; Collin Raye	Silver Screen Cowboys Tribute "Happy Trails" "One Has My Name (The Other Has My Heart)" "Back in the Saddle Again"

== Presenters ==
Presenter(s)	Notes
Louise Mandrell; Aaron Tippin; Lila McCann	Video of the Year
Mickey Gilley; Lee Ann Womack	Top New Vocal Duo or Group
Collin Raye	Presented Cliffie Stone Pioneer Award to Glen Campbell
Lynn Anderson; Neal McCoy; Sara Evans	Song of the Year
Tim McGraw; Shania Twain	Top Vocal Group or Duo of the Year
Doug Stone; Tracy Lawrence	Top New Female Vocalist
Dick Clark	Presented Double Diamond Award to Shania Twain
Alan Autry; Janie Fricke; Joe Diffie	Top Vocal Event of the Year
Billy Dean; Crystal Bernard	Top New Male Vocalist
Billy Ray Cyrus; Marie Osmond	Single Record of the Year
Buck Owens; Chely Wright	Album of the Year
Jay Leno	Presented Artist of the Decade Award to Garth Brooks
Chuck Norris; LeAnn Rimes	Top Male Vocalist of the Year
Larry Gatlin; Jack Hanna	Top Female Vocalist of the Year
John Schneider; Jane Seymour	Entertainer of the Year
