= Loving Every Minute =

Loving Every Minute may refer to:

- "Loving Every Minute" (Lighthouse Family song), 1996
- Loving Every Minute (album), an album by Mark Wills
  - "Loving Every Minute" (Mark Wills song), its title track
- Lovin' Every Minute, an album by Baillie & the Boys

== See also ==
- Lovin' Every Minute of It, a 1985 album by Loverboy
  - "Lovin' Every Minute of It" (song), the title track
