= 19 Somethin' =

Single by Mark Wills

from the album Greatest Hits
- B-side: "When You Think of Me"
- Released: September 23, 2002
- Genre: Country
- Length: 3:20
- Label: Mercury Nashville
- Songwriters: David Lee; Chris DuBois
- Producers: Chris Lindsey; Mark Wills

Mark Wills singles chronology
"I'm Not Gonna Do Anything Without You" (2001)	"19 Somethin'" (2002)	"When You Think of Me" (2003)

"19 Somethin'" is a song written by David Lee and Chris DuBois and recorded by American country music singer Mark Wills. It was released in September 2002 as the first single from his Greatest Hits compilation album and spent six weeks at number one on the Hot Country Songs chart in early 2003. It reached number 23 on the Billboard Hot 100 and was the longer-lasting of Wills' two number one singles. It would become the number 2 country song of the decade on Billboard's Hot Country Songs Chart.

== Content ==
The song begins with singer's reminiscence of his formative years, the 1970s and 1980s. In the first verse and chorus, various 1970s-related bits of pop culture are referenced, such as Star Wars, Farrah Fawcett, eight tracks, and Stretch Armstrong; the first verse also mentions the videogame Pac-Man ("I had the Pac-Man pattern memorized.") The first chorus begins with the line "It was 1970-somethin' / In the world that I grew up in." Verse two, similarly, references 1980s pop culture, such as the Rubik's Cube, black Pontiac Trans Ams, and MTV. The second chorus likewise begins with "It was 1980-somethin'." In the song's bridge, the singer then expresses his desire to escape to his childhood years: "Now I've got a mortgage and an SUV / All this responsibility makes me wish sometimes / That it was 1980-somethin’."

As the song was still at number one the week of the Space Shuttle Columbia disaster occurred, some radio stations momentarily stopped playing the single as the song contained the line "A space shuttle fell out of the sky," a reference to the similar Challenger disaster that occurred in 1986. Despite this however, the song would remain at number one on the Billboard Hot Country Singles & Tracks, despite a decline of 323 play detections from radio stations monitored by Billboard for the week of February 15, 2003.

== Reception ==
=== Critical ===
An uncredited article in The Charlotte Observer said that the success of "19 Somethin'" was "doubly great" because it was a number one single and because it was up-tempo, in comparison to Wills's earlier ballads, such as "Don't Laugh at Me" and "Wish You Were Here".

=== Awards ===
"19 Somethin'" was nominated for Single of the Year at the 38th annual Academy of Country Music awards in May 2003.

== Chart positions ==
"19 Somethin'" debuted at number 56 on the U.S. Billboard Hot Country Singles & Tracks for the week of October 5, 2002. It was Wills' second number one single, his first being "Wish You Were Here" in May 1999.

Chart (2002–2003)	Peak position
US Billboard Hot 100	23
US Hot Country Songs (Billboard)	1

=== Year-end charts ===
Chart (2003)	Position
US Billboard Hot 100	84
US Country Songs (Billboard)	3

== Certifications ==
Region	Certification	Certified units/sales
United States (RIAA)	Gold	500,000^{‡}
^{‡} Sales+streaming figures based on certification alone.

== Personnel ==
According to liner notes.

- Tim Akers – keyboards
- J. T. Corenflos – electric guitar
- Eric Darken – percussion
- Aubrey Haynie – fiddle
- Wes Hightower – background vocals
- Jimmie Lee Sloas – bass guitar
- Biff Watson – acoustic guitar
- Mark Wills – lead vocals
- Lonnie Wilson – drums

== Parody ==
- Country music parodist Cledus T. Judd parodied the song as "270 Somethin'" on his 2003 EP A Six Pack of Judd. Judd's parody tells of an obese person who loses weight.
