= Right Field =

Right Field can refer to:

- Right field, an outfield position in baseball or softball
- "Right Field", a song on Peter, Paul & Mary's 1986 album No Easy Walk to Freedom
