= I'd Rather Be in Love =

I'd Rather Be in Love prefers to

- "I'd Rather Be in Love", a Peter, Paul & Mary song on the 1986 album: No Easy Walk to Freedom
- "I'd Rather Be in Love", a Michelle Branch song on the 2001 debut album: The Spirit Room
