= Aimee Mayo =

American songwriter (born 1971)

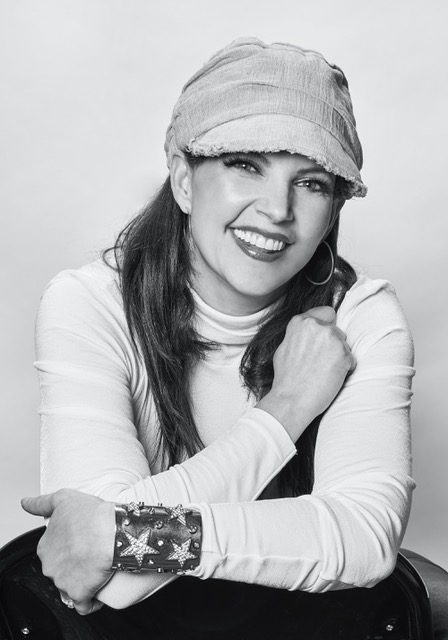
- Mayo in 2020

Background information
- Born: September 28, 1971 (age 54)
- Origin: Gadsden, Alabama, U.S.
- Genres: Country
- Occupations: Songwriter; author
- Years active: 1995–present
- Organization: Little Blue Typewriter Music
- Spouse: Chris Lindsey
- Children: 3
- Relatives: Danny Mayo (father), Cory Mayo (brother)
- Website: aimeemayo.com

Aimee Mayo (born September 28, 1971) is an American author and songwriter from Gadsden, Alabama.

She has written songs recorded by artists such as Tim McGraw, Meghan Trainor, The Backstreet Boys, Billy Currington, and Kellie Pickler. She co-wrote the American country band Lonestar's 1999 single 'Amazed', which was nominated for Best Country Song at the 42nd Annual Grammy Awards.

She has received multiple awards, including BMI Foundation's Country Song of the Year and Songwriter of the Year awards. Mayo has also received over a dozen BMI Country Awards and BMI Pop Awards.

== Personal life ==
Mayo grew up in Gadsden. Her father, Danny Mayo, was a songwriter known for 'Feed Jake' and 'Keeper of the Stars', and her brother Cory Mayo wrote 'You'll Be There' for George Strait in 2005.

Mayo moved to Nashville at the age of 20, where she signed a songwriting contract with BMG.

Mayo is married to fellow songwriter Chris Lindsey; they have three children.

== Career ==
Songs written or co-written by Mayo have collectively spent twenty-six weeks at the #1 spot on the charts, and albums featuring her songs have sold over 155 million copies worldwide.Billboard

Mayo was named BMI Songwriter of the Year in 2000.

She has commented on her early career, saying, "I lived in many basements where we had to share a laundry room. It took about seven years before I could afford my own house with a real bathtub."

'Amazed', recorded by Lonestar in 2000, is a notable song written by Mayo. In 2004, it received a Million-Air award from BMI. It won Academy of Country Music (ACM) Song of the Year, BMI Song of the Year, and NSAI Song of the Year, and was nominated for a Grammy. 'Amazed' crossed over to the pop charts, spending two weeks at the top of the Hot 100, becoming the first country song to reach number one on that chart since 'Islands in the Stream' by Dolly Parton and Kenny Rogers in 1983.

Mayo's song 'This One's for the Girls', recorded by Martina McBride, reached #1 on the Billboard 's Adult Contemporary chart for eleven weeks, in addition to reaching number three on the country chart. The song was used as a theme song for the morning show.

Mayo co-wrote the song 'Wheel of the World' on Carrie Underwood's second studio album with husband Chris Lindsey and collaborator Hillary Lindsey.

Mayo was a judge on the CMT reality competition show, Can You Duet.

In 2020, Mayo released a memoir titled Talking to the Sky.

== Songwriting credits ==
Year	Song title	Artist	Album
1995	"Strangers"	Mark Chesnutt	Wings
1996	"Places I've Never Been"	Mark Wills	Mark Wills
1997	"Three Chords and the Truth"	Sara Evans	Non-album single
1997	"(Ooh, Aah) Crazy Kind of Love Thing"	The Kinleys	Just Between You and Me
1998	"Make Up Your Mind"	Deana Carter	Everything's Gonna Be Alright
1998	"Me"	Faith Hill	Faith
1998	"Closer to Heaven"	Mila Mason	The Strong One
1998	"More Than Everything"	Rhett Akins	What Livin's All About
1999	"Unknown"	Chely Wright	Single White Female
1999	"Let's Make Love"	Faith Hill & Tim McGraw	Breathe
1999	"There Will Come a Day"	Faith Hill	Breathe
1999	"Understanding Everything"	Jim Lauderdale	Onward Through It All
1999	"It's Always Something"	Joe Diffie	
1999	"California"	Kenny Chesney	Everywhere We Go
1999	"Amazed"	Lonestar	Lonely Grill
1999	"I'll Get You Back"	Mark Chesnutt	I Don't Want to Miss a Thing
1999	"Over and Over"	Mindy McCready	I'm Not So Tough
1999	"Take Me Apart"	Mindy McCready	I'm Not So Tough
1999	"Thunder and Roses"	Mindy McCready	I'm Not So Tough
1999	"My Best Friend"	Tim McGraw	A Place in the Sun
1999	"Seventeen"	Tim McGraw	A Place in the Sun
1999	"Can I Want Your Love"	Trace Adkins	More...
1999	"Nothing Like You"	William Topley	Spanish Wells
1999	"Nothing Else Matters"	William Topley	Spanish Wells
2000	"Are You Ever Gonna Love Me"	Chris Cagle	Play It Loud
2000	"Closer"	Jo Dee Messina	Burn
2000	"You Don't"	Sara Evans	Born To Fly
2001	"Karma"	Jessica Andrews	Who I Am
2001	"When Did I Lose You"	Mark Wills	Loving Every Minute
2001	"Thunder and Roses"	Pam Tillis	Thunder & Roses
2001	"Smilin'"	Tim McGraw	Set This Circus Down
2001	"Things Change"	Tim McGraw	Set This Circus Down
2002	"Amazed"	Bonnie Tyler	Heart And Soul
2002	"Beautiful"	Faith Hill	Cry
2002	"You're Still Here"	Faith Hill	Cry
2002	"Closer To You"	William Topley	Feasting With Panthers
2003	"Tangled Up"	Billy Currington	Best of Billy Currington
2003	"Simple Life"	Carolyn Dawn Johnson	Dress Rehearsal
2003	"Liar"	Deana Carter	I'm Just a Girl
2003	"I Wish For You"	Jessica Andrews	Now
2003	"Never Be Forgotten"	Jessica Andrews	Now
2003	"Now"	Jessica Andrews	Now
2003	"You Are"	Jimmy Wayne	Jimmy Wayne
2003	"Are You Ever Gonna Love Me"	Jimmy Wayne	Jimmy Wayne
2003	"Trespassin'"	Jimmy Wayne	Jimmy Wayne
2003	"This One's for the Girls"	Martina McBride	Martina
2003	"I Just Close My Eyes"	Mark Wills	And the Crowd Goes Wild
2003	"Backseat of a Greyhound Bus"	Sara Evans	Restless
2004	"Drugs or Jesus"	Tim McGraw	Live Like You Were Dying
2004	"Rocks"	Lorrie Morgan	Show Me How
2004	"Where I Belong"	Rachel Proctor	Where I Belong
2005	"Who You Are"	Erika Jo	Erika Jo
2005	"I Am A Man"	Lonestar	Coming Home
2005	"Who You'd Be Today"	Kenny Chesney	The Road and the Radio
2005	"The Secrets That We Keep"	Sara Evans	Real Fine Place
2006	"Firecrackers and Ferris Wheels"	Blue County	Firecrackers And Ferriswheels
2006	"Men & Mascara"	Julie Roberts	Men & Mascara
2006	"I Wonder"	Kellie Pickler	Small Town Girl
2006	"Red High Heels"	Kellie Pickler	Small Town Girl
2006	My Angel"	Kellie Pickler	Small Town Girl
2006	"One Of The Guys"	Kellie Pickler	Small Town Girl
2006	"Small Town Girl"	Kellie Pickler	Small Town Girl
2006	"Let's Make Love"	Patrizio Buanne	Forever Begins Tonight
2006	"Words Get in the Way"	Trace Adkins	Dangerous Man
2007	"Let's Get Drunk and Fight"	Aaron Lines	Moments That Matter
2007	"Oh Love"	Brad Paisley & Carrie Underwood	5th Gear
2007	"The Wheel of the World"	Carrie Underwood	Carnival Ride
2007	"Love You With All My Heart"	Sara Evans	Greatest Hits
2007	"Pray For You"	Sara Evans	Greatest Hits
2007	"Red Umbrella"	Faith Hill	The Hits
2007	"Let's Get Drunk and Fight"	Joe Nichols	Real Things
2007	"Let It Go"	Tim McGraw	Let It Go
2007	"Helpless When She Smiles"	Backstreet Boys	Unbreakable
2007	"How I Feel"	Martina McBride	Waking Up Laughing
2008	"Young Love"	Carter's Chord	Carter's Chord
2008	"I Need A Man"	Crystal Shawanda	Dawn of a New Day
2008	"Cry Cry ('Til the Sun Shines)"	Heidi Newfield	What Am I Waiting For
2008	"Out the Window"	Ashley Gearing	Out The Window
2008	"Happy"	Kellie Pickler	Kellie Pickler
2008	"Going Out in Style"	Kellie Pickler	Kellie Pickler
2008	"One Last Time"	Kellie Pickler	Kellie Pickler
2008	"Didn't You Know How Much I Loved You"	Kellie Pickler	Kellie Pickler
2008	"Don't You Know You're Beautiful"	Kellie Pickler	Kellie Pickler
2008	"Somebody to Love Me"	Kellie Pickler	Kellie Pickler
2008	"When I Loved You Like That"	Jessica Simpson	Do You Know
2008	"Days of Thunder"	Mark Wills	Familiar Stranger
2008	"Panama City"	Mark Wills	Familiar Stranger
2009	"Sleepwalker"	Adam Lambert	For Your Entertainment
2009	"Amazed"	Boyz II Men	Love
2009	"Address in the Stars"	Caitlin & Will	Caitlin & Will – EP
2009	"Dark Horse"	Caitlin & Will	Caitlin & Will – EP
2009	"Strangers On A Train"	David Nail	I'm About to Come Alive
2009	"Good Girls"	Tim McGraw	Southern Voice
2009	"Poison & Wine"	The Civil Wars	Live at Eddie's Attic
2009	"Feels Just Like a Love Song"	Sara Evans	Non-album single
2009	"I'm Here"	VanVelzen	Take Me In
2010	"Someday When I'm Old"	Easton Corbin	Easton Corbin
2010	"Say Goodbye"	Katharine McPhee	Unbroken
2012	"Miss Your Fire"	Casey James	Casey James
2012	"Crazy One More Time"	Kip Moore	Up All Night
2013	"Wild Boy"	Danielle Bradbery	Danielle Bradbery
2013	"I Forgive You"	Kellie Pickler	The Woman I Am
2016	"Bar at the End of the World"	Kenny Chesney	Cosmic Hallelujah
2016	"Every Time I Hear That Song"	Blake Shelton	If I'm Honest
2018	"House of Cards"	Caitlyn Smith	Starfire
2018	"Champagne High	Westside cast, Alexandra Kay, Taz Zavala and Pia Toscano	Westside: Music from the Original Series
2020	"Supernova"	Caitlyn Smith	Supernova
2020	"Crazy One More Time"	Kip Moore	The Longing (EP)
2020	"Doggone"	Tim McGraw	Here on Earth
2023	"They Don't Make 'Em Like That No More"	Riley Green	Ain't My Last Rodeo

== Awards and nominations ==
=== Grammy Awards ===
Year	Nominee / work	Award	Result
2000	"Amazed"	Best Country Song	Nominated

=== Academy of Country Music Awards ===
Year	Nominee / work	Award	Result
2000	"Amazed"	Song of the Year	Won

=== Country Music Association Awards ===
Year	Nominee / work	Award	Result
2000	"Amazed"	Song of the Year	Nominated
