= Songs of Conscience and Concern =

Compilation album by Peter, Paul and Mary
- Released: 1999
- Genre: Folk
- Label: WEA
- Producer: Peter Yarrow, John McClure, David Kahne, Phil Ramone

Professional ratings
Review scores
Source	Rating
Allmusic	4/5 stars

Songs of Conscience and Concern: A Retrospective Collection is a 1999 compilation album by American folk group Peter, Paul and Mary. It was the group's second compilation, following 1970's Ten Years Together: The Best of Peter, Paul & Mary. Drawn primarily from the trio's 1980s and 1990s material, it's a profile of the group's most serious songs from their second phase. The sole new song, "Don't Laugh At Me", has since become a classic in its own right, evidenced by its inclusion on their most recent greatest hits album from Rhino Records.

== Track listing ==
1. Wasn't That a Time
2. Pastures of Plenty
3. Power
4. If I Were Free
5. Coming of the Roads
6. El Salvador
7. The Great Mandala
8. All My Trials
9. All Mixed Up
10. Danny's Downs
11. Don't Laugh at Me
12. Home Is Where the Heart Is
13. There But for Fortune
14. Old Coat
15. Because All Men Are Brothers
