= Address in the Stars =

Single by Caitlin & Will

from the album Caitlin & Will – EP
- Released: March 28, 2009
- Genre: Country
- Length: 4:28; 3:36 (radio edit)
- Label: Columbia Nashville
- Songwriters: Caitlin Lynn, Aimee Mayo, Chris Lindsey, Hillary Lindsey
- Producer: Chris Lindsey

Music video
- "Address in the Stars" at CMT.com

"Address in the Stars" is a song written by Caitlin Lynn, Aimee Mayo, Chris Lindsey, Hillary Lindsey and recorded by American country duo Caitlin & Will. The song, their only single, was released in March 2009. It was intended as the lead-off single to their debut album, Dark Horse, which went unreleased. Originally, "Even Now" was to be their first single, however, while on radio tours, radio stations started playing "Address in the Stars", and listeners began to like the song more. Two weeks before "Even Now" was to be released to radio, the single was switched.

The song appears on their self-titled EP, which was released on March 31, 2009, via Columbia Records' Nashville division.

== Content ==
The song's narrator is put in the position of dealing with the death of a loved one and having so much that she still wants to say to the one she has lost. With that in mind she wishes that she could find a way to say these things and formulates letters containing her feelings, however the song comes to its dramatic climax when she reveals that no matter how hard she tries and wishes there is no address to send a letter or a last thought to in the stars.

== Reception ==
Matt Bjorke, of Roughstock.com, said the song "seems tailor-made for not only radio but for an amazing music video. Caitlin's vocals soar on this song, and it's hard to see how fans of Trisha Yearwood and Carrie Underwood won't like this song as well for Caitlin Lynn has a magnificent voice. Will provides harmony vocals on this track but does have a great voice of his own." Frequency Magazine gave the song 4 1/2 stars. "Their voices blend together beautifully. Caitlin sings lead and her voice is a perfect fit for the melancholy mood. The music fits perfectly and does a really nice job of changing the pace and volume to fit with the mood of the song." MusicRow writer Robert K. Oermann also gave a positive review, saying, "Both of these kids sing their faces off. Caitlin’s goose-bump raising vocal takes the lead while Will wails soulful harmony on the string-drenched choruses."

== Music video ==
The music video for the song first premiered on July 15, 2009, on the website for the Grand Ole Opry, and then on CMT a day later. The video shows Caitlin sitting in a room as she sings the song, while Will is shown playing the guitar in a thicket of dead trees with lanterns hanging on them. It is done entirely in black and white, with a few short lapses into color where the lanterns glow orange. An alternate version of the video, with minor differences, was released on July 30, 2009. The second video features scenes of Caitlin standing in the dead forest tossing letters into the night sky. Both were directed by Steven L. Weaver.

== Chart performance ==
"Address in the Stars" debuted at number 60 on the Billboard Hot Country Songs chart for the chart week of March 28, 2009. It peaked at number 42 in June 2009.

Chart (2009)	Peak position
US Country Songs (Billboard)	42
