= Wish You Were Here (Mark Wills album) =

Studio album by Mark Wills
- Released: May 5, 1998
- Recorded: 1997
- Studios: Cayman Moon Recorders (Berry Hill, Tennessee); The Castle (Franklin, Tennessee); Sound Emporium Studios, Sound Stage Studios and Wedgewood Sound (Nashville, Tennessee)
- Genre: Country
- Length: 38:13
- Label: Mercury Nashville
- Producer: Carson Chamberlain

Mark Wills chronology
Mark Wills (1996)	Wish You Were Here (1998)	Permanently (2000)

Singles from Wish You Were Here
- 1. "I Do (Cherish You)" Released: February 23, 1998; 2. "Don't Laugh at Me" Released: July 13, 1998; 3. "Wish You Were Here" Released: January 11, 1999; 4. "She's in Love" Released: June 14, 1999

Professional ratings
Review scores
Source	Rating
Allmusic	3/5 stars

Wish You Were Here is the second studio album of American country music artist Mark Wills. Released on May 5, 1998, on Mercury Nashville Records, the album produced four singles on the Billboard Hot Country Singles & Tracks (now Hot Country Songs) charts, all of which made top 10: "I Do (Cherish You)", "Don't Laugh at Me", "Wish You Were Here", and "She's in Love". The album itself peaked at #8 on the Billboard Top Country Albums charts and #74 on The Billboard 200. It also received RIAA platinum certification for U.S. sales of one million copies.

The title track, which was the third release, became Wills's first Number One hit on the country charts in mid-1999. "I Do (Cherish You)" was later covered by 98 Degrees on their album 98 Degrees and Rising, from which it was also released as a single.

== Track listing ==
No.	Title	Writer(s)	Length
1.	"Don't Think I Won't"	Ted Hewitt, Rodney Atkins, Max T. Barnes	2:31
2.	"Emily Harper"	Lee Thomas Miller, Michael White	3:23
3.	"Wish You Were Here"	Skip Ewing, Bill Anderson, Debbie Moore	4:00
4.	"She's in Love"	Keith Stegall, Dan Hill	4:42
5.	"Love Is Alive"	Charlie Craig, Shane Teeters, Bruce Bouton	2:50
6.	"Don't Laugh at Me"	Allen Shamblin, Steve Seskin	3:36
7.	"The Last Memory"	Tony Martin, Sunny Russ	3:26
8.	"Help Me Fall"	Ewing, Donny Kees	3:17
9.	"It's Working"	Bob Regan, Barnes	3:16
10.	"Anywhere but Memphis"	Monty Criswell, Martin, Mark Wills	3:34
11.	"I Do (Cherish You)"	Stegall, Hill	3:17

== Personnel ==
- Mark Wills – lead vocals, additional backing vocals (1, 4)
- Gary Prim – keyboards
- Brent Mason – electric guitars
- John D. Willis – acoustic guitars, gut-string guitar
- Dan Dugmore – lap steel guitar
- Paul Franklin – steel guitar
- Glenn Worf – bass
- Eddie Bayers – drums
- Aubrey Haynie – fiddle
- John Wesley Ryles – backing vocals

=== Production ===
- Keith Stegall – executive producer
- Carson Chamberlain – producer
- John Kelton – recording, mixing
- Paula Montonado – recording assistant, mix assistant
- Steve Lowery – overdub recording
- Mark Nevers – overdub recording
- Hank Williams – mastering at MasterMix (Nashville, Tennessee)
- Claudia Mize – A&R administrative director
- Sandra Fox – production coordinator
- Sonda Perkins – production assistant
- Jim Kemp – art direction
- Alter Ego Design – design
- Matthew Barnes – photography
- Jennifer Kemp – stylist
- Lorrie Turk – hair, make-up
- Star Ray Management – management

== Charts ==
=== Weekly charts ===
Chart (1998)	Peak position
US Billboard 200	74
US Top Country Albums (Billboard)	8
US Heatseekers Albums (Billboard)	1

=== Year-end charts ===
Chart (1998)	Position
US Top Country Albums (Billboard)	30
