= 1999 Country Music Association Awards =

Annual US music awards ceremony

- Date: September 22, 1999
- Location: Grand Ole Opry House, Nashville, Tennessee, U.S.
- Hosted by: Vince Gill
- Most wins: Dixie Chicks (3)
- Most nominations: Tim McGraw, Vince Gill (5 each)

Television/radio coverage
- Network: CBS

The 1999 Country Music Association Awards, the 33rd edition of the Country Music Association Awards, was held on September 22, 1999, at the Grand Ole Opry House in Nashville, Tennessee. It was hosted by Vince Gill.

Tim McGraw and Vince Gill had the most nominations, five each.

The awards show, broadcast on CBS, was notable for an incident involving the song "Choices" by George Jones. The Country Music Association (CMA) had invited Jones to perform it during the show, but required that he perform an abridged version. Jones refused, and did not attend the show. Alan Jackson was angry with the CMA's decision, and mid-performance of his song "Pop a Top" during the show, played the chorus of Jones' song in protest, before angrily exiting the stage to a long standing ovation.

== Winners and nominees ==
Winner are in bold.

Entertainer of the Year	Album of the Year
**Shania Twain**; Garth Brooks; Dixie Chicks; Tim McGraw; George Strait	**A Place In The Sun — Tim McGraw**; Always Never The Same — George Strait; The Key — Vince Gill; Two Teardrops — Steve Wariner; Where Your Roads Lead — Trisha Yearwood
Male Vocalist of the Year	Female Vocalist of the Year
**Tim McGraw**; Vince Gill; Alan Jackson; George Strait; Steve Wariner	**Martina McBride**; Faith Hill; Jo Dee Messina; Shania Twain; Trisha Yearwood
Vocal Group of the Year	Vocal Duo of the Year
**Dixie Chicks**; Alabama; Diamond Rio; Lonestar; The Wilkinsons	**Brooks & Dunn**; The Kinleys; The Lynns; Montgomery Gentry; The Warren Brothers
Single of the Year	Song of the Year
**"Wide Open Spaces" — Dixie Chicks**; "Amazed" — Lonestar; "Choices" — George Jones; "Don't Laugh At Me" — Mark Wills; "Please Remember Me" — Tim McGraw	**"This Kiss" — Robin Lerner, Annie Roboff, and Beth Nielsen Chapman**; "Don't Laugh At Me" — Allen Shamblin and Steve Seskin; "Husbands And Wives" — Roger Miller; "If You Ever Have Forever In Mind" — Vince Gill and Troy Seals; "Please Remember Me" — Rodney Crowell and Will Jennings
Horizon Award	Musician of the Year
**Jo Dee Messina**; Kenny Chesney; Sara Evans; The Wilkinsons; Chely Wright	**Randy Scruggs**; Eddie Bayers; Paul Franklin; Dann Huff; Brent Mason
Music Video of the Year	Music Event of the Year
**"Wide Open Spaces" — Dixie Chicks**; "Don't Laugh At Me" — Mark Wills; "How Forever Feels" — Kenny Chesney; "I'll Go On Loving You" — Alan Jackson; "Just To Hear You Say That You Love Me" — Tim McGraw and Faith Hill	**My Kind Of Woman/My Kind Of Man — Vince Gill and Patty Loveless**; No Place That Far — Sara Evans and Vince Gill; Old Dogs — Waylon Jennings, Mel Tillis, Bobby Bare and Jerry Reed; Same Old Train — Clint Black, Joe Diffie, Merle Haggard, Emmylou Harris, Alison Krauss, Patty Loveless, Earl Scruggs, Ricky Skaggs, Marty Stuart, Pam Tillis, Randy Travis, Travis Tritt and Dwight Yoakam; TRIO II — Dolly Parton, Emmylou Harris, and Linda Ronstadt

== Hall Of Fame ==
Country Music Hall Of Fame Inductees
Dolly Parton
Conway Twitty
Johnny Bond
