= Light One Candle =

Song by Peter, Paul and Mary

from the album No Easy Walk to Freedom
- Published: December 11, 1982
- Released: 1986
- Genre: Folk
- Length: 3:04
- Label: Gold Castle
- Songwriter(s): Peter Yarrow

"Light One Candle" is a song by the folk group Peter, Paul and Mary. The trio performed the song in concerts starting in 1982, before recording it for their 1986 studio album No Easy Walk to Freedom.

A popular Hanukkah song, "Light One Candle" features lyrics commemorating the war of national liberation fought by the Maccabees against the Seleucid Greek empire from 167 to 141 BCE. The war, and Maccabee victory, is described in the Books of the Maccabees and celebrated during the Jewish holiday of Hanukkah.

== History ==
"Light One Candle," written in 1982 by Peter Yarrow and first performed at Carnegie Hall, was a pacifist response to the 1982 Lebanon War as reflected in the lyrics:

   "Light one candle for the terrible sacrifice justice and freedom demand,
   "Light one candle for the wisdom to know when the peacemaker's time is at hand."[3][1]

In 1983, when Peter, Paul and Mary performed the song in Jerusalem - in a country torn over the Lebanon War - they added lyrics to address the political complexities faced by their audience:

    "Light one candle for the strength that we need to never become our own foe.
    "Light one candle for those who are suffering, pain we learned so long ago.
    "Light one candle for all we believe in, let anger not tear us apart.
    "Light one candle to bind us together with peace as the song in our heart..."[3]

When they repeated the chorus, "Don't let the light go out, it's lasted for so many years, Don't let the light go out, let it shine through our love and our tears," the politically mixed audience cheered.
