= And the Crowd Goes Wild =

Studio album by Mark Wills
- Released: October 21, 2003
- Studio: Ocean Way Nashville, Aimeeland Studio and Cartee Day Studios (Nashville, Tennessee)
- Genre: Country
- Length: 39:52
- Label: Mercury Nashville
- Producer: Chris Lindsey; Mark Wills

Mark Wills chronology
Greatest Hits (2002)	And the Crowd Goes Wild (2003)	Familiar Stranger (2008)

Singles from And the Crowd Goes Wild
- 1. "And the Crowd Goes Wild" Released: July 26, 2003; 2. "That's a Woman" Released: 2004

Professional ratings
Review scores
Source	Rating
Allmusic	3/5 stars

And the Crowd Goes Wild is the fifth studio album, and sixth album overall, by American country music artist Mark Wills. Released in 2003 as his last album for Mercury Nashville Records, the album produced two top 40 hit singles on the Billboard Hot Country Singles & Tracks (now Hot Country Songs) charts: the title track and "That's a Woman", which peaked at #29 and #40, respectively. The album itself peaked at #5 on the Billboard Top Country Albums charts, and #68 on The Billboard 200.

== Content ==
The title track was previously recorded by Jeffrey Steele on his 2002 album Somethin' in the Water, and later covered by PBR Allstars on their album Buck and Roll: Vol. 1. "Prisoner of the Highway" is a cover version of a song previously recorded by Ronnie Milsap, and features guest vocals from him. "What Hurts the Most" was later recorded by pop singer Jo O'Meara and country music trio Rascal Flatts, who released their versions in 2005 and 2006, respectively. Wills's version, though never released as a single itself, peaked at #51 on the Billboard Hot Digital Songs charts in 2006. Additionally, "A Singer in a Band" was later recorded by Joe Nichols on his 2004 album Revelation.

== Track listing ==
No.	Title	Writer(s)	Length
1.	"And the Crowd Goes Wild"	Craig Wiseman, Jeffrey Steele	4:00
2.	"He's a Cowboy"	Wiseman, Dan Couch, P. J. Smith	3:10
3.	"That's a Woman"	Rivers Rutherford, Steven Dale Jones	2:43
4.	"Prisoner of the Highway" (duet with Ronnie Milsap)	Mike Reid	4:23
5.	"What Hurts the Most"	Steele, Steve Robson	3:47
6.	"What She Sees in Me"	Jimmy Ritchey, Chuck Jones	3:49
7.	"Married in Mexico"	Trey Bruce, Cory Mayo	4:47
8.	"Nothin' but a Suntan"	James T. Slater	3:51
9.	"How Bad Do You Want It"	Tom Shapiro, Mark Nesler, Tony Martin	3:28
10.	"I Just Close My Eyes"	Chris Lindsey, Bill Luther, Aimee Mayo	4:51
11.	"A Singer in a Band"	Tim Mensy, Gary Harrison	3:15

== Personnel ==
- Mark Wills – vocals
- Tim Akers – keyboards
- Tom Bukovac – electric guitars (1–3, 5–11), acoustic guitars (2, 9–11)
- J. T. Corenflos – electric guitars
- Biff Watson – acoustic guitars (1, 3–8)
- Paul Franklin – steel guitar (3, 5, 6)
- Aubrey Haynie – mandolin (1), fiddle (2, 3, 5–11)
- Jimmie Lee Sloas – bass
- Lonnie Wilson – drums
- Eric Darken – percussion (1, 3, 5, 6)
- George Plaster – spoken commentary (1)
- Tommy Bass – backing vocals (1)
- Jeff Hazard – backing vocals (1)
- Bruce Johnson – backing vocals (1)
- Bruce Willingham – backing vocals (1)
- Vanessa Lynch – backing vocals (1)
- Aimee Mayo – backing vocals (1, 9)
- Wes Hightower – backing vocals (2, 3, 6–8, 10)
- Ronnie Milsap – vocals (4)
- John Wesley Ryles – backing vocals (4, 9, 11)
- Kelly Archer – backing vocals (9)
- Cory Mayo – backing vocals (9)

Nashville String Machine (Tracks 3 & 5)

- Carl Gorodetzky – conductor
- Carole Neuen-Rabinowitz – cello
- Julie Tanner – cello
- Kristin Wilkinson – viola
- David Angell – violin
- David Davidson – violin
- Conni Ellisor – violin
- Carolyn Huebl – violin
- Pamela Sixfin – violin
- Elizabeth Small – violin

=== Production ===
- Chris Lindsey – producer
- Mark Wills – producer
- Ricky Cobble – recording, digital editing
- David Bryant – recording assistant
- Greg Droman – mixing at The Sound Kitchen (Franklin, Tennessee)
- Todd Gunnerson – mix assistant
- Steve Crowder – tracking assistant (4)
- Ronnie Thomas – additional digital editing
- Shawn Simpson – digital editing (4)
- Hank Williams – mastering
- MasterMix (Nashville, Tennessee) – editing and mastering location
- Chris Kartevold – production coordinator
- Karen Naff – art direction, design
- Kristin Barlowe – photography
- Michael McCall – hair, make-up
- Renee Layher – wardrobe stylist
- International Artist Management – management

== Chart performance ==
Chart (2003)	Peak position
U.S. Billboard Top Country Albums	5
U.S. Billboard 200	68
