= High Low and In Between =

Single by Mark Wills

from the album Mark Wills
- A-side: "Jacob's Ladder"
- Released: October 1996
- Genre: Country
- Length: 3:16
- Label: Mercury Nashville
- Songwriter(s): David Kent; Harley Campbell
- Producer(s): Carson Chamberlain; Keith Stegall

Mark Wills singles chronology
"Jacob's Ladder" (1996)	"High Low and In Between" (1996)	"Places I've Never Been" (1997)

"High Low and In Between" is a song written by David Kent and Harley Campbell, and recorded by American country music singer Mark Wills. It was released in October 1996 as the second single from his self-titled debut album.

== Content ==
Jeffrey B. Remz of Country Standard Time called the song "a fiddle-driven, mid-tempo song about a man under the spell of his woman."

The song was the B-side of Wills' debut single "Jacob's Ladder".

== Critical reception ==
A review from Billboard was positive, praising Wills' "winning vocal personality" along with the presence of fiddle and steel guitar in the production.

== Chart performance ==
Chart (1996)	Peak position
Canadian RPM Country Tracks	48
US Hot Country Songs (Billboard)	33
