= Caitlin & Will (EP) =

EP by Caitlin & Will
- Released: March 31, 2009
- Genre: Country
- Length: 23:04
- Label: Columbia Nashville
- Producer: Chris Lindsey

Caitlin & Will – EP is the only release from Can You Duet winners Caitlin & Will. The EP was released on March 31, 2009, on Columbia Records' Nashville division. It features six songs including their only single, "Address in the Stars", which reached number 42 on the U.S. Billboard Hot Country Songs chart.

"Your Tears Are Comin'" was previously recorded by Montgomery Gentry for their 2006 album Some People Change.

== Track listing ==
1. "Even Now" (Casey Beathard, Karyn Rochelle) - 3:37
2. "Born Again" (Justin Pollard, Patrick Davis) - 4:16
3. "Dark Horse" (Caitlin Lynn, Will Snyder, Chris Lindsey, Aimee Mayo) - 3:59
4. "Leaves of September" (Al Anderson, Chris Stapleton) - 4:08
5. "Address in the Stars" (Lynn, Mayo, C. Lindsey, Hillary Lindsey) - 4:28
6. "Your Tears Are Comin'" (Tom Hambridge, Jeffrey Steele) - 3:16

== Chart performance ==
Chart (2009)	Peak position
U.S. Billboard Top Country Albums	51
U.S. Billboard Top Heatseekers	46
