= El Salvador (Peter, Paul and Mary song) =

"El Salvador" is a 1982 protest song about United States involvement in the Salvadoran Civil War, written by Noel Paul Stookey and performed by Peter, Paul and Mary. The song originally appeared on the 1986 album No Easy Walk to Freedom. It was included on the 1999 compilation album Songs of Conscience and Concern and as part of a 25th anniversary concert in New York's Greenwich Village at The Bitter End.

== Overview ==
Stookey wrote the song on Mother's Day, 1982, inspired by an article in a Roman Catholic magazine, and has said that the song was controversial even with the group's fans. In a 1997 interview with the Houston Chronicle, Stookey commented, "The most recent surprise we had was in the mid- to late-'80s, when we were singing a song called 'El Salvador'. The last line was, 'Don't you think it's time we leave El Salvador?' We actually got booed at our concerts, which was something we hadn't heard since the civil rights movement or the anti-war movement." Segments of the lyrics often were quoted in articles of the period, including this verse:

Just like Poland is protected by her Russian friends,
The junta is assisted by Americans.
And if $60 million seems too much to spend
in El Salvador;
They say for half a billion they could do it right,
Bomb all day, and burn all night,
Until there's not a living thing upright
in El Salvador.

— Noel Paul Stookey, "El Salvador"

Group member Mary Travers traveled to El Salvador in January 1983 with Rep. Ed Feighan in the early years of the war and subsequently was highly vocal in protest of U.S. support of "the terrorism, the rapes, and the murders", saying that as an American taxpayer, "I'm paying these murderers' salaries."

== See also ==
- "Lives in the Balance", song by Jackson Browne
