= She's in Love =

"She's In Love"

Single by Mark Wills

from the album Wish You Were Here
- B-side: "Don't Think I Won't"
- Released: June 14, 1999
- Genre: Country
- Length: 4:42
- Label: Mercury Nashville
- Songwriters: Keith Stegall; Dan Hill
- Producer: Carson Chamberlain

Mark Wills singles chronology
"Wish You Were Here" (1999)	"She's In Love" (1999)	"Back at One" (1999)

"She's In Love" is a song written by Keith Stegall and Dan Hill, and recorded by American country music artist Mark Wills. It was released in June 1999 as the fourth and final single from his album Wish You Were Here and it was his seventh single overall; it later appears on his Greatest Hits package. It peaked at #7 on the U.S. US Billboard Hot Country Singles & Tracks chart.

== Content ==
In the song, the narrator sings of how a friend of his has told him that she has fallen in love, and they swear to "stay in touch" and that she'll be his friend "till the day I die." The narrator notes all of the characteristics that show him that she truly has fallen in love and that it is not just something temporary; he then reflects that he wishes it were he.

== Critical reception ==
A review in Billboard was positive, stating that Wills' "sensitive rendering of the lyric gives the song additional emotional impact".

== Music video ==
The music video was directed by Charley Randazzo and premiered in June 1999.

== Chart performance ==
"She's in Love" debuted at #65 on Billboard's Hot Country Singles & Tracks for the week of June 19, 1999.

Chart (1999)	Peak position
Canada Country Singles (RPM)	18
US Billboard Hot 100	60
US Hot Country Songs (Billboard)	7

=== Year-end charts ===
Chart (1999)	Position
US Country Songs (Billboard)	50
