= Caitlin & Will =

American country music duo (2008–2009)

- Origin: Nashville, Tennessee, United States
- Genre: Country
- Years active: 2008–2009
- Label: Columbia Nashville
- Past members: Caitlin Lynn; Will Snyder

Caitlin & Will were an American country music duo, consisting of members Caitlin Lynn and Will Snyder, that rose to fame when they won season one of CMT's Can You Duet. After winning, they signed with Columbia Nashville. They initially intended to release a song titled "Even Now" as their debut single, but the label decided to release "Address in the Stars" instead. The song was released to radio on March 30, 2009 and peaked at No. 42. Their debut album went unreleased, and the duo disbanded in October 2009.

== History ==
Caitlin Lynn was born in Glen Burnie, Maryland, while Will Snyder was born in London, Kentucky. The two had originally auditioned for Can You Duet with different partners, but were put together by executives of the show.

After winning the competition, they were signed to Columbia Records' Nashville division and started work on recording their debut album. While originally their debut single was to be "Even Now", after a string of radio tours, the label decided to change the single to "Address in the Stars", which peaked at number 42 on Hot Country Songs. The song peaked at No. 42 on Hot Country Songs in June 2009. They made their Grand Ole Opry debut on May 22, 2009.

On March 31, 2009, they released a six-song digital EP, entitled Caitlin & Will - EP, which was produced by songwriter Chris Lindsey. The EP debuted and peaked on both the Billboard Top Country Albums and Top Heatseekers charts at No. 51 and No. 46, respectively. The album included "Address in the Stars" and five other songs, which would have been included on their debut album, Dark Horse. It was announced on October 1, 2009 that Caitlin & Will had parted ways with Columbia Records Nashville. Thus, Dark Horse went unreleased, and it was announced that the duo had split.

== Discography ==
=== Extended plays ===
Title	Details	Peak chart positions	
Title	Details	US Country	US Heat
Caitlin & Will – EP	Released: March 31, 2009; Label: Columbia Nashville	51	46

=== Singles ===
Title	Year	Peak chart positions	Album
Title	Year	US Country	Album
"Even Now"	2009	—	Caitlin & Will
"Address in the Stars"	2009	42	Caitlin & Will

=== Music videos ===
Title	Year	Director
"Even Now"	2009	The Erwin Bros.
"Address in the Stars" (version 1)	2009	Steven L. Weaver
"Address in the Stars" (version 2)	2009	Steven L. Weaver
