= And the Crowd Goes Wild (song) =

Single by Mark Wills

from the album And the Crowd Goes Wild
- Released: July 26, 2003
- Genre: Country
- Length: 4:00
- Label: Mercury
- Songwriters: Craig Wiseman, Jeffrey Steele
- Producers: Chris Lindsey, Mark Wills

Mark Wills singles chronology
"When You Think of Me" (2003)	"And the Crowd Goes Wild" (2003)	"That's a Woman" (2004)

"And the Crowd Goes Wild" is a song recorded by American country music singer Mark Wills. It was released in July 2003 as the first single and title track from his album of the same name. The song reached #29 on the Billboard Hot Country Singles & Tracks chart. The song was written by Jeffrey Steele and Craig Wiseman.

== Critical reception ==
A review by Maria Konicki Dinoia of AllMusic said the song is a get-out-of-your-seat rocker that's bound to inspire.

== Music video ==
The music video opens with Wills as a newscaster, then later performing for an audience. The video was directed by Peter Zavadil.

== Chart performance ==
Chart (2003)	Peak position
US Hot Country Songs (Billboard)	29
