= Loving Every Minute (Mark Wills song) =

Single by Mark Wills

from the album Loving Every Minute
- B-side: "One of These Days"
- Released: April 23, 2001
- Genre: Country
- Length: 4:14
- Label: Mercury
- Songwriters: Michael White, Tom Shapiro, Monty Criswell
- Producer: Carson Chamberlain

Mark Wills singles chronology
"I Want to Know (Everything There Is to Know About You)" (2000)	"Loving Every Minute" (2001)	"I'm Not Gonna Do Anything Without You" (2001)

"Loving Every Minute" is a song written by Michael White, Tom Shapiro and Monty Criswell, and recorded by American country music artist Mark Wills. It was released in April 2001 as the first single and title track from the album Loving Every Minute. The song reached number 18 on the Billboard Hot Country Singles & Tracks chart.

== Music video ==
The music video was directed by Trey Fanjoy and premiered in May 2001.

== Chart performance ==
"Loving Every Minute" debuted at number 58 on the U.S. Billboard Hot Country Singles & Tracks for the week of April 28, 2001.

Chart (2001)	Peak position
US Hot Country Songs (Billboard)	18
US Bubbling Under Hot 100 (Billboard)	7
