= Steve Seskin =

American songwriter

- Born: March 31, 1952 (age 74)
- Origin: The Bronx, New York City
- Genres: Country; folk
- Occupations: Singer, songwriter, musician
- Years active: 1971 – present
- Label: Sony Records
- Website: steveseskin.com

Steve Seskin is an American singer, songwriter, and musician whose songs have been recorded by recording artists Garth Brooks, Reba McEntire, Waylon Jennings, Tim McGraw, Collin Raye, and Mark Wills among others. The debut single from McGraw's Set This Circus Down, "Grown Men Don't Cry", was nominated for a 2002 Grammy award and also garnered the No. 1 position on the Billboard Country Single Chart in June 2001. Seskin also is known for performing at schools in support of the Operation Respect/Don't Laugh at Me project, named after "Don't Laugh at Me," a song he wrote with Allen Shamblin that was recorded by Mark Wills and Peter, Paul and Mary, among others.

Seskin splits his time between touring, Nashville and Northern California.

== Early life ==
Steve Seskin was born (March 31, 1952) in The Bronx, New York to parents Zelda (née Wein) and Irving Seskin. Seskin began playing guitar at 14 years old and started writing songs shortly after. He moved to San Francisco in 1971 and began his music career as a street performer progressing to festivals and clubs.

After opening a concert for Crystal Gayle, she suggested that Seskin should go to Nashville to pursue songwriting, which he did. During his first visit there in 1985, Seskin began with only one appointment with an ASCAP executive who subsequently arranged Seskin's appointments with several publishers.

== Music career ==
=== Selected discography ===
Artist	Song title	Credit	Year
Reba McEntire	Cactus in a Coffee Can	Composer	2019
Crystal Bowersox	Alive	Composer	2017
Seth Glier	Like I Do	Composer	2017
Marie Osmond	Music is Medicine	Composer	2016
Seth Glier	Electricity	Composer	2015
Tom Beck (actor)	Go My Way	Composer	2012
Trent Jeffcoat	Hero to Someone	Composer	2010
Tracy Lawrence	I'm Done	Composer	2009
Kathy Mattea	Right Out of Nowhere	Composer	2005
Peter, Paul and Mary	Don't Laugh at Me	Composer	2005
Eidolon	Live to Dance	Composer	2004
Brian McComas	I'll Always Be There For You	Composer	2003
John Michael Montgomery	Pictures	Composer	2002
J. Michael Harter	Hard Call to Make	Composer	2002
Georgia Middleman	No Place Like Home	Composer	2001
Jerry Jeff Walker	Every Drop of Water	Composer	2001
Tim McGraw	Grown Men Don't Cry	Composer	2001
Johnsmith	God Knows Why	Composer	2000
Penny Framstad	People with My Last Name	Composer	2000
Toby Keith	New Orleans	composer	2000
Jerry Kilgore	Cactus in a Coffee Can	Composer	1999
The Oak Ridge Boys	New Orleans	Composer	1999
Olivia Newton-John	Attention	Composer	1998
Maria Sangiolo	Something Real	Composer	1998
The Wilkinsons	Then There's You	Composer	1998
Mark Wills	Don't Laugh at Me	Composer	1998
Jeff Wood	Use Mine	Composer	1997
Sid Spencer	If You've Got Love	Composer	1996
Paul Jefferson	I'm Here	Composer	1996
Ricochet (band)	Daddy's Money	Composer	1996
Wilcox and Pardoe	I Think About You	Composer	1995
Kenny Chesney	All I Need to Know	Composer	1995
Dennis Warner	Skippin' Stones	Composer	1995
Woody Lee	I Like the Sound of That	Composer	1995
Collin Raye	I Think About You	Composer	1995
John Michael Montgomery	No Man's Land	Composer	1995
Ricky Skaggs	Every Drop of Water	Composer	1995
Neal McCoy	For a Change	Composer	1995
John Michael Montgomery	If You've Got Love	Composer	1994
Neal McCoy	No Doubt About It	Composer	1994
Tim McGraw	Welcome to the Club	Composer	1993
Pam Tillis	We've Tried Everything Else	Composer	1992
John Michael Montgomery	Life's a Dance	Composer	1992
Darryl & Don Ellis	It's Bigger Than the Both of Us	Composer	1992
Neal McCoy	Where Do Daddies Go?	Composer	1992
Karen Tobin	Wedding Bed	Composer	1991
Dr. Elmo	Wedding Bed	Composer	1991
Nitty Gritty Dirt Band	You Made Life Good Again	Composer	1991
Delbert McClinton	That's the Way I Feel	Composer	1990
Waylon Jennings	Wrong	Composer	1990
The Marcy Brothers	You're Not Even Crying	Composer	1989
Moe Bandy	A Long Way From Lonely	Composer	1989
Alabama	She Can	Composer	1989

=== Grown Men Don't Cry ===
"Grown Men Don't Cry", written by Tom Douglas and Steve Seskin was recorded by American country music artist Tim McGraw. It was released in April 2001 as the first single from McGraw's 2001 album Set This Circus Down. The song reached number one on the US Billboard Hot Country Singles & Tracks (now Hot Country Songs) chart and peaked at number 25 on the Billboard Hot 100

"Grown Men Don't Cry" debuted at number 30 on the U.S. Billboard Hot Country Singles & Tracks for the chart week of March 24, 2001.

Chart (2001)	Peak position
US Hot Country Songs (Billboard)	1
US Billboard Hot 100	25

=== Don't Laugh at Me ===
"Don't Laugh at Me", written by Allen Shamblin and Steve Seskin, was recorded by American country music artist Mark Wills. It was released in July 1998 as the second single from album Wish You Were Here. "Don't Laugh at Me" was a number 2 hit on the Billboard country charts. The song received Country Music Association nominations for Country Music Association's Single, Song and Video of the Year in 1998.

"Don't Laugh at Me" debuted at number 69 on the U.S. Billboard Hot Country Singles & Tracks for the week of July 18, 1998. The song peaked at number 2 on the Hot Country Songs chart on October 10, 1998.

Chart (1998)	Peak position
Canada Country Singles (RPM)	2
US Billboard Hot 100	73
US Hot Country Songs (Billboard)	2

== Books ==
- Sing My Song Book & CD - A Kid's Guide to Songwriting - 2008
- A Chance to Shine Book & CD - 2006
- Don't Laugh at Me Book & CD - 2002
- Songwriting and the Guitar - 2000

== Teaching ==
Seskin teaches songwriting workshops throughout the U.S. as well as teaching songwriting courses at San Francisco State University, The Kerrville Folk Festival Songwriting School and The Rocky Mountain Folk Festival. He has played an active role as a songwriting teacher and mentor at West Coast Songwriters Association since 1988 and Nashville Songwriters Association International since 1995.

== Operation Respect Don't Laugh at Me ==
Seskin is the co-writer of “Don’t Laugh At Me”, the song that was the impetus for the Operation Respect program and organization, co-founded by Peter Yarrow.

Operation Respect, a non-profit education and advocacy organization dedicated to advancing the social and emotional growth of children and youth, was founded in 1999 by Peter Yarrow of the folk trio Peter, Paul and Mary, and Dr. Charlotte Frank. Operation Respect was first inspired by a moment between father and daughter (Bethany Yarrow), a singer and activist who told her dad that he had to hear a song called Don’t Laugh at Me. She believed that it was exactly the kind of movement creating music Peter, Paul and Mary stood for. Written by Steve Seskin, now an Operation Respect Board Member, and Allen Shamblin, the lyrics of Don’t Laugh at Me is Operation Respect's theme song and classroom-based curricula. Since its inception, their speakers and performers have addressed over 500,000 educators, educational leaders, parents, students, policy makers and community members throughout the world.

=== Kids Write Songs ===
Seskin is the founder of Kids Write Songs, a songwriting workshop teaching creative expression to children of all ages as well as teaching them to create their own songs that address issues that affect bullying, respect, peer pressure, diversity, and self-esteem. Workshops consist of 3 to 4 sessions with about 30 students each session.

=== The Parkland Project – Wake Up America ===
The Parkland Project, a youth-inspired songwriting initiative, released original songs at the National Association for Music Education National Conference. The tracks tell of the surviving students’ deep trauma from the shooting at Marjory Stoneman Douglas High School on Valentine's Day, Feb 14, 2018 and reflect a commitment to the student-led movements dedicated to stopping the killing of their classmates and peers, and the passing of gun laws to do so.

Written and composed by the students of Parkland, Florida, with the guidance of noted songwriters such as Steve Seskin and Peter Yarrow and music producers affiliated with Operation Respect, the album, Wake Up, America, its title track, followed by compositions, Song for the Silenced, Transparent, Valentine’s Day, Change the Ref, We Got the Power, Armor Off, Watering Can Full of Tears, The Children Will Lead the Way, and We Need was released. Proceeds from the songs benefit Shine MSD and Change the Ref, Parkland-based organizations providing art-based trauma informed therapy and advocates of gun-violence prevention.

== Sources ==
- http://www.taxi.com/transmitter/0305/headlineC0305.html
