= What Hurts the Most =

2003 song by Mark Wills

Song by Mark Wills

from the album And the Crowd Goes Wild
- Released: October 21, 2003
- Genre: Country pop
- Length: 3:47
- Label: Mercury Nashville
- Songwriters: Jeffrey Steele; Steve Robson
- Producers: Chris Lindsey; Mark Wills

Audio
- "What Hurts the Most" by Mark Wills on YouTube

"What Hurts the Most" is a song written by American songwriter Jeffrey Steele and English songwriter Steve Robson. Originally recorded by country music artist Mark Wills in 2003 on his album And the Crowd Goes Wild, it was covered by Bellefire a year later. The first version to be released as a single was by pop singer Jo O'Meara in 2005, from the album Relentless. Later that year, country band Rascal Flatts covered the song as well, releasing it as the first single from the 2006 album Me and My Gang, topping the U.S. country and adult contemporary charts with it. German band Cascada later had international chart success with the song in 2007.

== Content ==
Jeffrey Steele co-wrote the song with Steve Robson, with whom he also co-wrote Rascal Flatts' 2002 single "These Days". Robson presented Steele with an unfinished track, and Steele decided to come up with lyrics to finish the track. Originally, he had wanted to write a song about the loss of his father, but instead went with a more universal theme of lost love. After singing the lyrics, he decided that he liked how sad the song sounded, when Robson suggested that it be recorded in a higher key to sound more emotional.

Mark Wills was the first artist to record the song, doing so on his 2003 album And the Crowd Goes Wild. Jo O'Meara, a pop singer, released the song in 2005 and had chart success with it in the United Kingdom. Faith Hill had also intended to include the song on her 2005 album Fireflies, and although she had recorded the song, her version did not make the final cut. Rascal Flatts then recorded the song as well, and per producer Dann Huff's suggestion, it made their album Me and My Gang. Wills' rendition of the song, though never a single, peaked at number 51 on the U.S. Hot Digital Songs charts in 2006 in the wake of Rascal Flatts' success with it.

== Jo O'Meara version ==
"What Hurts the Most"

Single by Jo O'Meara

from the album Relentless
- B-side: "The First Time"; "Never Meant to Break Your Heart"; "Let's Love"
- Released: September 26, 2005
- Recorded: 2005
- Genre: Pop
- Length: 3:29
- Label: Sanctuary
- Songwriters: Jeffrey Steele; Steve Robson
- Producer: Brian Rawling

Jo O'Meara singles chronology
"What Hurts the Most" (2005)	"On The Surface" (2021)

Audio
- "What Hurts The Most" by Jo O'Meara on YouTube

British singer Jo O'Meara, who was originally the leader of the pop music band S Club 7, released the song in 2005 as her first solo single, becoming the first artist to release it as a single. It was the lead single from her debut album Relentless. O'Meara's version peaked at number 13 in the UK Singles Chart.

=== Track listings ===
CD 1

1. "What Hurts the Most" – 3:21
2. "The First Time" – 4:11

CD 2

1. "What Hurts the Most" – 3:21
2. "Never Meant to Break Your Heart" – 4:28
3. "Let's Love" (Metro Mix) – 5:40
4. "What Hurts the Most" (CD-ROM Video)

=== Charts ===
==== Weekly charts ====
Chart (2005)	Peak position
Ireland (IRMA)	26
Scotland Singles (OCC)	11
UK Singles (OCC)	13

==== Year-end charts ====
Chart (2005)	Position
UK Singles (OCC)	236

== Rascal Flatts version ==
"What Hurts the Most"

Single by Rascal Flatts

from the album Me and My Gang
- Released: January 9, 2006
- Recorded: 2005
- Genre: Country; country pop
- Length: 3:34
- Label: Lyric Street
- Songwriters: Jeffrey Steele; Steve Robson
- Producers: Dann Huff; Rascal Flatts

Rascal Flatts singles chronology
"Skin (Sarabeth)" (2005)	"What Hurts the Most" (2006)	"Me and My Gang" (2006)

Music video
- "What Hurts The Most" by Rascal Flatts on YouTube

In 2006, country music trio Rascal Flatts released a cover of this song as a single from their album Me and My Gang, and it became their fifth number-one single on the Billboard Hot Country Songs chart. It also peaked at number six on the all-genre Billboard Hot 100, becoming the band's first top 10 pop hit. In addition, the song reached number one on the Adult Contemporary charts. Rascal Flatts also performed the song live with Kelly Clarkson at the Academy of Country Music Awards in 2006.

Rascal Flatts' recording earned two nominations for the 49th Annual Grammy Awards, in the categories of Best Country Performance by a Duo or Group with Vocals, and Best Country Song.

As of the chart dated January 30, 2010, the song topped the 2 million mark in paid downloads. This makes Rascal Flatts the first country group to top the 2 million mark with two songs. By April 2011, the song sold 2.28 million in the US.

In 2025, Rascal Flatts released a new rendition of the track featuring the American vocal group Backstreet Boys, as part of their eleventh studio album Life Is a Highway: Refueled Duets.

=== Music video ===
The music video starts with a young girl crying over the loss of her boyfriend. She expresses anger for her father who she blames for making her boyfriend leave, resulting in his demise in a car crash. The girl's very hurt mother watches her daughter's anger for her father and cries as she feels helpless over this unfortunate situation. Over the course of the video, there are scenes of the band playing, flashbacks of the couple, and the girl trying to go about her life. A scene in which with the girl is vomiting in her bathroom and holding her stomach implies that she became pregnant right before her lover's death. The video ends with the girl running up to the boy's wooden cross memorial on the side of the road, to kneel down and say that she saw him, answering his question asked earlier in the video "What do you see?" when they were talking about the future, while a storm is brewing. The music video was directed by Shaun Silva in early 2006. The video won the award for Group Video of the Year at the 2007 CMT Music Awards and was also nominated for Video of the Year.

=== Composition ===
Rascal Flatts' version of the song is set in the key of F minor, with a vocal range of E♭_{3}-C_{5}. The main chord pattern is Fm-D♭-A♭-E♭.

=== Personnel ===
From Me and My Gang liner notes.

- Tim Akers – keyboards
- Jay DeMarcus – bass guitar
- Paul Franklin – steel guitar
- Dann Huff – guitars
- Charlie Judge – keyboards
- Gary LeVox – lead vocals
- Chris McHugh – drums
- Joe Don Rooney – guitars
- Jonathan Yudkin – fiddle, banjo

=== Charts and certifications ===
==== Weekly charts ====
Chart (2006–2007)	Peak position
Canada Hot 100 (Billboard)	45
Canada AC (Billboard)	2
Canada Country (Radio & Records)	1
Canada Hot AC (Billboard)	44
UK Singles (OCC)	103
US Billboard Hot 100	6
US Adult Contemporary (Billboard)	1
US Adult Pop Airplay (Billboard)	9
US Hot Country Songs (Billboard)	1
US Pop Airplay (Billboard)	22

=== Year-end charts ===
Chart (2006)	Position
US Billboard Hot 100	26
US Adult Contemporary (Billboard)	13
US Adult Top 40 (Billboard)	26
US Country Songs (Billboard)	4

Chart (2007)	Position
US Adult Contemporary (Billboard)	9

==== Certifications ====
Certifications for "What Hurts the Most"
Region	Certification	Certified units/sales
United States (RIAA)	5× Platinum	5,000,000^{‡}
^{‡} Sales+streaming figures based on certification alone.

== Cascada version ==
"What Hurts the Most"

Single by Cascada

from the album Perfect Day
- Released: November 21, 2007
- Recorded: 2007
- Genre: Eurodance
- Length: 3:39
- Label: Zooland
- Songwriters: Jeffrey Steele; Steve Robson
- Producers: DJ Manian; Yann Peifer

Cascada singles chronology
"Last Christmas" (2007)	"What Hurts the Most" (2007)	"What Do You Want from Me?" (2008)

Music video
- "What Hurts the Most" (US video) by Cascada on YouTube
- "What Hurts the Most (international video) by Cascada on YouTube

=== Background and composition ===
In 2007, German Eurodance trio Cascada recorded a cover of "What Hurts the Most" for their second studio album, Perfect Day (2007). The cover was produced and recorded by band members Yanou and DJ Manian at Plazmatek Studio Cologne in Cologne, Germany. The song serves as the first single from Perfect Day (2007). It was first released in Sweden on November 21, 2007, in digital and physical formats, through Zooland Records. The song was later released in the United Kingdom as a digital single on December 3, 2007, and as a CD single a week later, through All Around the World. The releases featured remixes by several disc jockeys, including Darren Styles, Spencer & Hill and Flip & Fill. "What Hurts the Most" was solicited to mainstream radio stations on December 11, 2007, in the United States, following its digital and physical release within the two weeks before. In Germany, the cover was released as a CD and digital single on January 4, 2008, through Zeitgeist.

In contrast to the original version, Cascada's cover of "What Hurts the Most" deviates from the country sound and replaces it with Europop electronic beats and elements typical of DJ Manian and Yanou productions. However, the song opens with an acoustic guitar playing and Horler's vocals being reverbed by electropop synths. Sharon Mawer of AllMusic noted that despite the heavy electronic beats, lead singer Natalie Horler's vocals are never dominated by the music. According to the digital music sheet published at Musicnotes.com by BPJ Administration, the song is composed in a key of F♯ minor while carrying a tempo of 144 beats per minute. Horler's vocals range between a high register of A_{3} to a low register of C♯_{5}.

=== Critical reception ===
Alex Fletcher of Digital Spy gave the song a three-star rating, saying that "it's not as good as previous single 'Everytime We Touch' for sure, but its teasing, lucid intro, which bursts into the hand-clap-inducing, hip-swiveling chorus after a flurry of robotic drum beats is certainly a good giggle." Kurt Kirton of About.com named it one of the album's standout tracks. Chuck Taylor of Billboard gave "What Hurts the Most" a positive review, writing that "this track is remixed into a frothy uptempo anthem, complete with requisite percussive thump and an exulted vocal (with 12 mixes in all) that leaves the lyric's potential heartbreak in the dust." Taylor ended his review, asking "Wouldn't it be wondrous if American programmers renewed their vow in 2008 to put variety on the airwaves—or do we really need a fifth entry in the top 10 from T-Pain?"

=== Chart performance ===
In Sweden, Cascada's cover of "What Hurts the Most" debuted on the Swedish Singles Chart on November 22, 2007, at number five, where it peaked. The song fell to number eight the next week, where it stalled on the chart for three weeks. On December 13, 2007, the song debuted and peaked on the Irish Singles Chart at number six. In the United Kingdom, the song debuted on the UK Singles Chart at number 16 on December 9, 2007. In the following week, the song reached a peak of number 10. It exited the chart at nineteen weeks, logging its last week at number 85. On March 22, 2008, the cover debuted and peaked on the French Singles Chart at number two. The song fell to number four in the following weeks and eventually fell off of the chart after twenty-seven weeks.

On January 26, 2008, the band's cover of "What Hurts the Most" entered the Billboard Hot 100 at number 95. The song rose to number 80 in the following week. On March 22, 2008, the cover peaked at number 52. The song serves as Cascada's lowest-charting single on the Hot 100 as well as their lowest-charting lead single. Aside from charting on the Hot 100, the song managed to peak at the top of Billboard Hot Dance Club Songs and at number 28 on the US Billboard Pop Songs. Despite its low peak on the Hot 100, the song managed to sell more than 500,000 downloads, earning a Gold certification by the Recording Industry Association of America in October 2009. In Canada, the song managed to peak at number 54 and lasted on the chart for eleven weeks.

=== Music video ===
The music video for "What Hurts the Most" was filmed in Los Angeles was released on January 24, 2008, to the US digital markets.

=== International version ===
The video opens with Horler sitting in a studio apartment living room holding a note saying "I can't sorry". It moves to a scene, that is intercut throughout the video, where Horler is seen performing in front of a lit up brick wall. When the first verse begins, Horler leaves the room to open the door, allowing her friends to enter. One friend sees the note and tears it up in disgust. More friends came into the apartment and soon began partying. After the chorus ends, the video moves to a tattoo parlor, where Horler receives a tattoo. As the second chorus commences, she is against a wall, appearing heartbroken, while her former love interest gestures toward the wall, attempting to try to reach out to her. Scenes of the house party continue to play throughout the rest of the video. Near the end of the second chorus, Horler is sitting against a white brick, with mascara running from her eyes, telling that she was crying. On the wall is a window in which the love interest appears to be frustrated. As the song approaches the last chorus, the house party ends with the guests exiting Horler's apartment. The video ends with Horler opening the door to see her former lover, who exchanges a smile with her, and shutting the door on him, leaving with a smile on her face.

=== US version ===
Same as the International version but the first minute of the video features Horler singing in the living room. As the song approaches the chorus, Horler leaves the room and moves to a secluded room where she is seen crying. In that scene, there is also an opening that shows an image of the protagonist's former lover staring into the opening. After the chorus ends, Horler sits at a tattoo parlor while the artists gives her a tattoo. She is then seen sitting against a wall while the love interest gestures to the other side, attempting to reach out to her. As the video nears the final chorus, Horler is at a house party with her friends, appearing lonely and heartbroken.

=== Credits and personnel ===
- Recorded and produced at Plazmatek Studio Cologne in Cologne, Germany
- Songwriting – Jeffrey Steele, Steve Robson
- Production – Manuel Reuter, Yann Peifer
- Vocals – Natalie Horler

=== Charts ===
==== Weekly charts ====
Chart (2007–2008)	Peak position
Austria (Ö3 Austria Top 40)	3
Belgium (Ultratip Bubbling Under Wallonia)	5
Canada Hot 100 (Billboard)	54
Czech Republic Airplay (ČNS IFPI)	25
Europe (Eurochart Hot 100)	8
Finland (Suomen virallinen lista)	2
France (SNEP)	2
Germany (GfK)	9
Hungary (Dance Top 40)	5
Ireland (IRMA)	6
Netherlands (Dutch Top 40)	23
Netherlands (Single Top 100)	35
Scotland Singles (OCC)	4
Sweden (Sverigetopplistan)	5
Slovakia Airplay (ČNS IFPI)	85
UK Singles (OCC)	10
US Billboard Hot 100	52
US Dance Singles Sales (Billboard)	2
US Dance/Mix Show Airplay (Billboard)	1
US Pop Airplay (Billboard)	28

==== Year-end charts ====
Chart (2007)	Position
Sweden (Sverigetopplistan)	95
UK Singles (OCC)	159

Chart (2008)	Position
Austria (Ö3 Austria Top 40)	64
Europe (Eurochart Hot 100)	42
France (SNEP)	45
Germany (Media Control GfK)	96
UK Singles (OCC)	111

=== Certifications ===
Region	Certification	Certified units/sales
United Kingdom (BPI)	Silver	200,000^{‡}
United States (RIAA)	Gold	500,000^{*}
^{*} Sales figures based on certification alone.^{‡} Sales+streaming figures based on certification alone.

=== Release history ===
Region	Date	Format(s)	Label
Sweden	November 21, 2007	CD, digital download	Bonnier
United Kingdom	December 3, 2007	Digital download	All Around the World
United Kingdom	December 10, 2007	CD single	All Around the World
United States	November 27, 2007	Digital download	Robbins
United States	December 4, 2007	CD single	Robbins
Germany	January 3, 2008	CD, digital download	Zooland

== See also ==
- List of Billboard Adult Contemporary number ones of 2006 and 2007 (U.S.)
