= Places I've Never Been =

"Places I've Never Been""

Single by Mark Wills

from the album Mark Wills
- B-side: "Ace of Hearts"
- Released: February 17, 1997
- Genre: Country
- Length: 3:25
- Label: Mercury Nashville
- Songwriters: Aimee Mayo; Reese Wilson; Tony Martin
- Producers: Keith Stegall; Carson Chamberlain

Mark Wills singles chronology
"High Low and In Between" (1996)	"Places I've Never Been"" (1997)	"I Do (Cherish You)" (1998)

"Places I've Never Been" is a song written by Tony Martin, Reese Wilson and Aimee Mayo, and recorded by American country music artist Mark Wills. It was released in February 1997 as the third and final single from his album Mark Wills. It reached number 5 on the United States Billboard Hot Country Singles & Tracks chart and number 7 on the RPM Country Tracks chart in Canada.

== Music video ==
The music video was directed by Steven Goldmann and premiered in February 1997.

== Chart performance ==
"Places I've Never Been" debuted at number 58 on the U.S. Billboard Hot Country Singles & Tracks for the week of March 1, 1997.

Chart (1997)	Peak position
Canada Country Singles (RPM)	7
US Hot Country Songs (Billboard)	5

=== Year-end charts ===
Chart (1997)	Position
Canada Country Tracks (RPM)	63
US Country Songs (Billboard)	68
