= Mark Wills (album) =

Studio album by Mark Wills
- Released: June 11, 1996
- Studio: Cayman Moon Recorders (Berry Hill, Tennessee); Sound Stage Studios (Nashville, Tennessee)
- Genre: Country
- Length: 38:55
- Label: Mercury Nashville
- Producer: Carson Chamberlain; Keith Stegall

Mark Wills chronology
Mark Wills (1996)	Wish You Were Here (1998)

Singles from Mark Wills
- 1. "Jacob's Ladder" Released: May 27, 1996; 2. "High Low and In Between" Released: October 1996; 3. "Places I've Never Been" Released: February 17, 1997

Mark Wills is the debut studio album by American country music singer Mark Wills. Released in 1996 on Mercury Nashville Records, the album produced three hit singles on the Billboard Hot Country Singles & Tracks (now Hot Country Songs) charts: "Jacob's Ladder", "High Low and In Between", and "Places I've Never Been", which peaked at #6, #33, and #5, respectively. The album itself reached a peak of #38 on the Billboard Top Country Albums charts. "Look Where She Is Today" was previously cut by Doug Stone on his 1995 album Faith in Me, Faith in You. And "Ace of Hearts" was previously cut by Alan Jackson on his 1990 debut album Here in the Real World.

== Critical reception ==
Professional ratings
Review scores
Source	Rating
Entertainment Weekly	B+
Country Standard Time	negative

Alanna Nash of Entertainment Weekly rated the album "B+", stating in her review that the album "is full of rambunctious good-time songs teeming with sly wit and bittersweet ballads — all in a baritone that throbs with emotion." Jeffrey B. Remz of Country Standard Time was largely unfavorable, praising "High Low and In Between" but otherwise saying that Wills "recalls David Lee Murphy vocally, but sings a bit too effortlessly throughout, never sounding all that convincing as if he's lived the songs". He also described the album as "competent, but never rising above".

== Track listing ==
No.	Title	Writer(s)	Length
1.	"High Low and In Between"	Harley Campbell, David Kent	3:16
2.	"Jacob's Ladder"	Brenda Sweat, Cal Sweat, Tony Martin	3:05
3.	"What's Not to Love"	Trey Bruce, Max T. Barnes	3:29
4.	"Any Fool Can Say Goodbye"	Tim Mensy, Gary Harrison	3:02
5.	"Ace of Hearts"	Lonnie Wilson, Carson Chamberlain, Ron Moore	3:02
6.	"Leavin' Comin' On"	Skip Ewing, Jerry Kilgore	3:42
7.	"Sudden Stop"	Pat Bunch, Doug Johnson	2:28
8.	"I Wonder If He Knows"	Mensy, Roger Springer	3:19
9.	"Places I've Never Been"	Aimee Mayo, Reese Wilson, Martin	3:25
10.	"Squeeze Box"	Monty Criswell, Michael White	3:35
11.	"What Love Is"	Karen Taylor-Good, Roberta Schiller	2:58
12.	"Look Where She Is Today"	Billy Spencer, Ed Hill	3:24

== Personnel ==
- Mark Wills – vocals
- Dirk Johnson – acoustic piano (1, 2, 11)
- Gary Prim – acoustic piano (3, 4, 6, 8), clavinet (10)
- Matt Rollings – acoustic piano (5, 7, 9, 12)
- Wayne Toups – squeezebox (10)
- John Willis – acoustic guitars, mandolin (4)
- Brent Mason – electric guitars (1–3, 5–7, 9, 10, 12)
- Brent Rowan – electric guitars (4, 8, 10, 11)
- Mike Johnson – steel guitar (1, 11)
- Paul Franklin – steel guitar (2–10, 12)
- Glenn Worf – electric bass
- Lonnie Wilson – drums
- Aubrey Haynie – fiddle (1–6, 8–12)
- John Wesley Ryles – backing vocals

== Production ==
- Carson Chamberlain – producer
- Keith Stegall – producer
- John Kelton – recording, mixing
- Steve Lowery – vocal recording, additional engineer, second engineer
- Paula Montondo – second engineer
- Hank Williams – mastering at MasterMix (Nashville, Tennessee)
- Roxane Stueve – production coordinator
- Sonda Perkins – production assistant
- Bill Barnes – art direction
- Jim Kemp – art direction
- S. Watson – design
- Keith Carter – photography
- Lorrie Turk – hair, make-up
- Susan Bessire – stylist
- Star Ray Management – management

== Chart performance ==
Chart (1996)	Peak position
U.S. Billboard Top Country Albums	38
U.S. Billboard Top Heatseekers	26
