= Familiar Stranger (Mark Wills album) =

Studio album by Mark Wills
- Released: November 4, 2008
- Studios: Blackbird Studio, Ocean Way Nashville, The Engine Room and Station West (Nashville, Tennessee)
- Genre: Country
- Length: 43:03 (Standard release); 50:07 (Bonus Track release)
- Label: Tenacity
- Producer: Brett James

Mark Wills chronology
And the Crowd Goes Wild (2003)	Familiar Stranger (2008)	2nd Time Around (2009)

Singles from Familiar Stranger
- 1. "Take It All Out on Me" Released: October 31, 2006; 2. "Days of Thunder" Released: June 23, 2007; 3. "The Things We Forget" Released: February 10, 2009

Professional ratings
Review scores
Source	Rating
Country Standard Time	(not rated) link

Familiar Stranger is the sixth studio album by American country music artist Mark Wills. Originally recorded for Equity Music Group, it was released on November 4, 2008 by Tenacity Records. While signed to Equity, Wills released three singles: "Hank", "Take It All Out on Me" and "Days of Thunder", all of which reached the lower regions of the Billboard country charts. ("Hank" was never included on an album.) After "Days of Thunder", Wills exited the label. He then signed to Tenacity, who released "The Things We Forget" as its third single, then released the album itself in late 2008. "Entertaining Angels" was then issued as the fourth single in early 2009. The fifth single, "Crazy White Boy," was released in late 2009. The latter three failed to enter the country charts.

== Track listing ==
1. "Days of Thunder" (Brett James, Aimee Mayo) - 3:06
2. "The Things We Forget" (Connie Harrington, Wendell Mobley) - 3:33
3. "Entertaining Angels" (Keith Brown, Willie Mack, Steve Mandile) - 3:56
4. "Closer" (Bart Allmand, Jeffrey Steele) - 3:38
5. "Panama City" (Mayo, Rivers Rutherford, Troy Verges) - 3:33
6. "Take It All Out on Me" (Jim Collins, Mobley) - 3:26
7. "Rednecks Anonymous" (Ashley Gorley, Bryant Simpson) - 3:12
8. "The Likes of You" (Don Rollins, John Scott Sherrill, D. Vincent Williams) - 3:07
9. "Crazy White Boy" (Blair Daly, James) - 3:59
10. "What Are You Doing" (Bart Butler, Billy Decker, Mack) - 3:46
11. "Her Kiss" (Monty Criswell) - 3:51
12. "All the Crap I Do" (John Bettis, James) - 3:56

Bonus Track Edition

1. "Days of Thunder" - 3:04
2. "The Things We Forget" - 3:30
3. "Entertaining Angels" - 3:54
4. "Closer" - 3:36
5. "Panama City" - 3:30
6. "Take It All Out on Me" - 3:26
7. "Rednecks Anonymous" - 3:10
8. "The Likes of You" - 3:05
9. "Crazy White Boy" - 3:57
10. "Her Kiss" - 3:49
11. "All the Crap I Do" - 4:05
12. "Hank" (James, Bill Luther) - 3:58
13. "How Beautiful" (Mack, Rick Giles, Giles Godard) - 2:46
14. "Second 16" (Craig Monday, Chris Wallen) - 3:56

== Personnel ==
- Mark Wills – vocals
- Tim Akers – keyboards, acoustic piano
- Gary Smith – acoustic piano, Hammond B3 organ
- Mike Rojas – keyboards (10), acoustic piano (10)
- Larry Beaird – acoustic guitars
- Kenny Greenberg – guitars
- Troy Lancaster – guitars
- Ilya Toshinsky – acoustic guitars, mandolin
- Bob Britt – guitars (2, 4)
- Dan Dugmore – steel guitar
- Russ Pahl – steel guitar
- Mike Brignardello – bass
- Tommy Harden – drums
- Chris McHugh – drums
- Jonathan Yudkin – fiddle, mandolin
- Brett James – backing vocals

=== Production ===
- Brett James – producer, vocal recording
- Tony Castle – recording
- Ricky Cobble – recording
- Steve Marcantonio – recording
- Bryan Graban – recording assistant
- John Netty – recording assistant
- Leslie Richter – recording assistant (10)
- Steve Beers – additional engineer
- John Caldwell – additional engineer
- Billy Decker – mixing at Sound Stage Studios (Nashville, Tennessee)
- Andrew Mendelson – mastering at Georgetown Masters (Nashville, Tennessee)
- Kim Russell – art direction
- Kristin Barlowe – photography
- Scott Welch Management – management
