= Permanently =

Studio album by Mark Wills
- Released: January 11, 2000
- Recorded: 1999
- Studio: The Castle (Franklin, Tennessee); Sound Emporium Studios, The Sound Station and Wedgewood Studio (Nashville, Tennessee)
- Genre: Country
- Length: 47:35
- Label: Mercury Nashville
- Producer: Carson Chamberlain

Mark Wills chronology
Wish You Were Here (1998)	Permanently (2000)	Loving Every Minute (2001)

Singles from Permanently
- 1. "Back at One" Released: October 29, 1999; 2. "Almost Doesn't Count" Released: March 2000; 3. "(Everything There Is to Know About You)" Released: August 2000

Professional ratings
Review scores
Source	Rating
AllMusic	4/5 stars

Permanently is the third studio album by American country music singer Mark Wills. Released in 2000 on Mercury Nashville Records, the album produced three singles on the Billboard Hot Country Singles & Tracks chart: "Back at One", "Almost Doesn't Count", and (Everything There Is to Know About You", which peaked at Nos. 2, 19, and 33, respectively. "Back at One" was originally recorded by Brian McKnight, and "Almost Doesn't Count" by Brandy.

The album itself peaked at No. 3 on the Billboard Top Country Albums chart and No. 23 on The Billboard 200, making for Wills's highest peaks on these two charts. In addition, Permanently received RIAA gold certification for U.S. shipments of 500,000 copies.

== Track listing ==
No.	Title	Writer(s)	Length
1.	"This Can't Be Love"	Mark Nesler, Tony Martin	3:40
2.	"Rich Man"	D. Vincent Williams, Rory Feek	3:22
3.	"The Perfect Conversation"	Billy Kirsch	3:55
4.	"Still Waiting"	Harley Allen	3:31
5.	"Because I Love You"	Skip Ewing, Chuck Cannon	3:57
6.	"Right Here"	Billy Simon, Carson Chamberlain, Randy Boudreaux	3:36
7.	"Time Machine"	Tim Mensy, Monty Criswell, T. Martin	3:49
8.	"Permanently"	Steve Bogard, Josh Kear	3:11
9.	"Almost Doesn't Count"	Shelly Peiken, Guy Roche	3:40
10.	"Forget About Love"	Gary Harrison, Jeff Silver, Chip Martin	3:23
11.	"In My Arms"	Mark Wills, Michael White, Criswell	4:09
12.	"Everything There Is to Know About You"	Lewis Anderson, Bob Regan	3:16
13.	"Back at One"	Brian McKnight	4:06

== Personnel ==
- Mark Wills – lead vocals
- Gary Prim – keyboards
- Brent Mason – electric guitars
- John D. Willis – acoustic guitars
- Paul Franklin – steel guitar
- Glenn Worf – bass
- Eddie Bayers – drums
- Aubrey Haynie – fiddle, mandolin
- Liana Manis – backing vocals
- John Wesley Ryles – backing vocals

=== Production ===
- Carson Chamberlain – producer
- John Kelton – recording, mixing
- Brady Barnett – recording assistant, additional recording, mix assistant
- Mark Nevers – additional recording
- Jan Stoupe – additional recording assistant, mix assistant
- Hank Williams – mastering at MasterMix (Nashville, Tennessee)
- Claudia Mize – A&R administrative director
- Sonda Perkins – production coordinator
- Eric Dout – production assistant
- Gina R. Binkley – art direction
- Jim Kemp – art direction
- Alter Ego Design – design
- Matthew Barnes – cover photography
- Erin Zoufal – hair
- Brenda Melendez – make-up
- Jennifer Kemp – stylist
- Star Ray Management – management

== Charts ==
Chart (2000)	Peak position
U.S. Billboard 200	23
U.S. Billboard Top Country Albums	3
Canadian RPM Country Albums	8
