= Back at One =

1999 single by Brian McKnight

Single by Brian McKnight

from the album Back at One
- Released: August 9, 1999
- Length: 4:23 (album version); 3:24 (radio edit)
- Label: Motown
- Songwriter: Brian McKnight
- Producer: Brian McKnight

Brian McKnight singles chronology
"The Only One for Me" (1998)	"Back at One" (1999)	"6, 8, 12" (2000)

Music video
- "Back at One" on YouTube

"Back at One" is a song written and performed by American recording artist Brian McKnight. It was released as the lead single from his fifth studio album, Back at One (1999), on August 9, 1999. The song became a chart hit, reaching number two in the United States and entering the top 10 in Canada and New Zealand.

== Composition ==
Sheet music for "Back at One" is in the key of B major in common time with a slow tempo of 65 beats per minute. The song modulates a half step to C major for the last chorus.

== Chart performance ==
"Back at One" went on to be one of McKnight's biggest successes, reaching the top ten in New Zealand, Canada and the United States, where it eventually peaked at number two for eight weeks but was kept off the top spot by "Smooth" by Santana.

== Music video ==
The music video was directed by Francis Lawrence and was nominated for R&B video of the year in the Music Video Production Association Awards. In this music video, the ghost of Brian McKnight performs the song while walking out of the plane crash site at a cornfield.

== Charts ==
=== Weekly charts ===
Chart (1999–2000)	Peak position
Australia (ARIA)	24
Canada Top Singles (RPM)	4
Canada Adult Contemporary (RPM)	3
Canada CHR (Nielsen BDS)	7
Germany (GfK)	47
Iceland (Íslenski Listinn Topp 40)	33
Netherlands (Dutch Top 40)	28
Netherlands (Single Top 100)	33
New Zealand (Recorded Music NZ)	7
Switzerland (Schweizer Hitparade)	73
US Billboard Hot 100	2
US Adult Contemporary (Billboard)	4
US Adult Pop Airplay (Billboard)	25
US Hot R&B/Hip-Hop Songs (Billboard)	7
US Pop Airplay (Billboard)	2
US Rhythmic Airplay (Billboard)	1

=== Year-end charts ===
Chart (1999)	Position
US Billboard Hot 100	82
US Hot R&B/Hip-Hop Singles & Tracks (Billboard)	70
US Mainstream Top 40 (Billboard)	90
US Rhythmic Top 40 (Billboard)	21

Chart (2000)	Position
Brazil (Crowley) Ivete Sangalo remix	78
US Billboard Hot 100	20
US Adult Contemporary (Billboard)	7
US Adult Top 40 (Billboard)	57
US Hot R&B/Hip-Hop Singles & Tracks (Billboard)	55
US Mainstream Top 40 (Billboard)	25
US Rhythmic Top 40 (Billboard)	33
US Top 40 Tracks (Billboard)	23

== Certifications ==
Region	Certification	Certified units/sales
Brazil (Pro-Música Brasil)	Gold	30,000^{‡}
United States (RIAA)	Gold	500,000^{*}
^{*} Sales figures based on certification alone.^{‡} Sales+streaming figures based on certification alone.

== Release history ==
Region	Date	Format(s)	Label(s)	Ref(s).
United States	August 9, 1999	Adult contemporary; hot adult contemporary; modern adult contemporary radio	Motown	
United States	August 10, 1999	Contemporary hit; urban AC; urban radio	Motown	
United States	September 13, 1999	Smooth jazz radio	Motown	
United States	November 5, 2002	Digital download	Motown	

== Mark Wills version ==
"Back at One"

Single by Mark Wills

from the album Permanently
- B-side: "Because I Love You"
- Released: October 29, 1999
- Genre: Country
- Length: 4:06
- Label: Mercury Nashville
- Songwriter: Brian McKnight
- Producer: Carson Chamberlain

Mark Wills singles chronology
"She's in Love" (1999)	"Back at One" (1999)	"Almost Doesn't Count" (2000)

American country music artist Mark Wills covered "Back at One" on his 2000 album Permanently, also releasing it as that album's first single. Released in October 1999 (two months after McKnight's version), Wills' cover peaked at number two on the Billboard country singles charts for a week. Despite not reaching the top spot in the US, the song did manage to reach number one on the Canadian RPM country tracks. In addition to his country chart success, "Back at One" also became his fifth entry on the Hot 100 charts, peaking at number 36 there.

=== Music video ===
The music video was directed by Jim Hershleder.

=== Charts ===
Chart (1999–2000)	Peak position
Canada Country Singles (RPM)	1
US Billboard Hot 100	36
US Hot Country Songs (Billboard)	2

=== Year-end charts ===
Chart (2000)	Position
US Hot Country Singles & Tracks (Billboard)	22

== Other versions ==
McKnight also performed the song with Brazilian singer Ivete Sangalo on her album Festa (en: Party).

In 2000, keyboardist Bob Baldwin released a cover of the song from the album BobBaldwin.com. Also in 2000, Jamaican reggae and dancehall singer Sanchez recorded a reggae cover version of the song over the "Fi Wi Rock" rhythm produced by King Jammy which became a popular dancehall hit in Jamaica and the US.

In 2001, UK music artist Lulu recorded the song for her album Together with a duet with Irish pop band Westlife and performed it live subsequently.

In 2003, Smooth jazz guitarist and musician Paul Jackson, Jr. covered the song as the closing track from the album Still Small Voice.

Another instrumental rendition of this song has been performed by saxophonist Warren Hill, from his album 2005 PopJazz.

In 2006, British pop singer Shayne Ward also performed this song on his debut album Shayne Ward.

Singer Mijares covered it in his 2009 Spanish album Vivir Así.
