= Jacob's Ladder (Mark Wills song) =

Single by Mark Wills

from the album Mark Wills
- B-side: "High Low and In Between"
- Released: May 27, 1996
- Genre: Country
- Length: 3:05
- Label: Mercury Nashville
- Songwriters: Cal Sweat; Brenda Sweat; Tony Martin
- Producers: Keith Stegall; Carson Chamberlain

Mark Wills singles chronology
"Jacob's Ladder" (1996)	"High Low and In Between" (1996)

"Jacob's Ladder" is a song written by Cal Sweat, Brenda Sweat, and Tony Martin, and recorded by American country music artist Mark Wills. It was released in May 1996 as his debut single, and was served as the first single from his self-titled debut album. It reached a peak of number 6 on both the U.S. Billboard country singles chart and the Canadian RPM Country Tracks chart.

== Content ==
The song is a mid-tempo recalling two lovers, a rich land owner's daughter named Rachel and a poor farm boy named Jacob. Although Rachel's father does not want her to "waste her life with a common man" like Jacob, she loves him anyway. The title is a play on words, as in the chorus, Jacob climbs up to Rachel's bedroom window with a ladder ("'Cause Heaven was waiting at the top of Jacob's ladder"). In the second verse, Jacob and Rachel are now married with a daughter. The daughter asks Rachel's father to recall the story of their meeting, which he does.

== Critical reception ==
Alanna Nash of Entertainment Weekly cited "Jacob's Ladder" as a "radio-ready" track in her review of the album. Jeffrey B. Remz of Country Standard Time called it "another breezy song about cross-class love, nothing you haven't heard before." Deborah Evans Price, of Billboard magazine reviewed the song favorably, saying that Wills has a "warm, likeable voice and charmingly delivers this sweet tune about a poor boy wooing a rich girl." She goes on to say that while it is a story we have all heard before, it is written and delivered in "such a winning fashion."

== Chart performance ==
"Jacob's Ladder" debuted on the Billboard Hot Country Singles & Tracks (now Hot Country Songs) charts at number 56 on the chart week of June 8, 1996. It spent 20 weeks on that chart, peaking at number 6 on the chart week of September 28. The song's B-side, "High Low and In Between," was released in October 1996 as the second single from Wills' debut.

Chart (1996)	Peak position
Canada Country Singles (RPM)	6
US Hot Country Songs (Billboard)	6

=== Year-end charts ===
Chart (1996)	Position
Canada Country Tracks (RPM)	40

== Covers ==
Irish country singer Gerry Guthrie covered the song in his 2012 country covers album Good Country Songs.
