= No Easy Walk to Freedom =

Studio album by Peter, Paul and Mary
- Released: 1986
- Studios: Giant Sound (New York City); RCA (New York City)
- Genres: Folk; pop
- Length: 33:42
- Label: Gold Castle
- Producers: John McClure, Peter Yarrow

Peter, Paul and Mary albums chronology
Such Is Love (1982)	No Easy Walk to Freedom (1986)	A Holiday Concert With the New York Choral Society (1988)

No Easy Walk to Freedom is a studio album by the American folk music trio Peter, Paul and Mary, released in 1986 by Gold Castle Records. Its release coincided with the group's 25th anniversary. Produced by John McClure and Peter Yarrow, the album was nominated in the Best Contemporary Folk Album category at the 29th Annual Grammy Awards.

== Background and composition ==
Without a label, Peter, Paul and Mary signed with Gold Castle Records to record No Easy Walk to Freedom. Released in 1986, it marked the trio's 25th anniversary. The album was their first studio recording in almost nine years. The title track was written for Nelson Mandela. The group sought to connect the causes of Mandela and Martin Luther King Jr. A few years later, Peter, Paul and Mary performed "No Easy Walk to Freedom" at an event in Tokyo honoring Mandela, shortly after his release from prison. A music video for the song, directed by George Gage and Jim Shea, features archival footage depicting the group's involvement in human rights issues, along with performance clips. Other songs on the album include "El Salvador", a protest song about the United States' involvement in the Salvadoran Civil War, and "Light One Candle", written for Jewish dissidents in the Soviet Union.

== Critical reception ==
Billboard noted the group's "familiar formula of story-songs and socially conscious material" and described the album as "a pleasant return to form." A review in Digital Audio and Compact Disc Review observed that the album's songs are "each stamped with PP&M's unique voice and harmonies, that deal not only with protest, but also with love, friendship, and childhood." AllMusic's L. Katz wrote, "This is one of the trio's later releases and, if their fire is a bit dimmed, one can't blame them. However, if you want a CD that brings you back to the dawn of the flower-child generation, this probably isn't the one." Keith Tuber of Orange Coast said: "Makes you wonder why it took 10 years and a new label to showcase the talent of these legendary performers." A review in the Reno Gazette-Journal called the album "an extraordinary comeback, a set of 10 political broadsides and topical ballads. The arrangements are clean and fresh and the performances are genuinely moving from start to finish."

No Easy Walk to Freedom received a 1987 Grammy Award nomination in the Best Contemporary Folk Album category.

== Track listing ==
Side one

1. "Weave Me the Sunshine" (Peter Yarrow) – 2:19
2. "Right Field" (Willy Welch) – 3:36
3. "I'd Rather Be in Love" (Pat Alger, Walter Carter) – 3:00
4. "State of the Heart" (Richard Kniss, Noel Paul Stookey) – 3:21
5. "No Easy Walk to Freedom" (Margery Tabankin, Yarrow) – 2:47

Side two

1. "Greenland Whale Fisheries" (traditional) – 4:13
2. "Whispered Words" (Yarrow) – 3:21
3. "El Salvador" (Stookey) – 3:58
4. "Greenwood" (Yarrow) – 4:03
5. "Light One Candle" (Yarrow) – 3:04

== Personnel ==
Credits adapted from LP liner notes.

- Peter Yarrow
- Noel "Paul" Stookey
- Mary Travers

Additional musicians

- David Brown – acoustic guitar (1–3, 5, 7–10)
- Anthony MacDonald – percussion (1–3, 5, 8, 10)
- Richard Kniss – acoustic bass (1–2, 4, 6, 10)
- Eric Weissberg – banjo (2)
- Warren Bernhardt – keyboards (3)
- Anthony Jackson – electric bass (3, 5)
- Ed Walsh – keyboards (4, 7–9)
- Mick Moloney – mandolin (6)
- Séamus Egan – penny whistle (6)
- Lori Cole – concertina (6)
- Jay Leonhart – acoustic bass (7, 9), electric bass (8)
- New York Choral Society – chorus (10)

Technical

- John McClure – producer, engineer
- Peter Yarrow – producer
- Robert De Cormier – musical director
- Malcolm Pollack – mixing
- Jeff Cox – assistant engineer
- Ted Jensen – mastering
- Milton Glaser – album cover design
- George Leavitt – cover art associate designer
- Gregory Heisler – album cover photo
- John Robb – black and white photo
- Matthew Klein – composite album photo

== Charts ==
Chart (1986–87)	Peak position
US Billboard 200	173
