= Loving Every Minute (album) =

Studio album by Mark Wills
- Released: August 21, 2001
- Studio: Sound Emporium Studios and The Sound Station (Nashville, Tennessee)
- Genre: Country
- Length: 46:35
- Label: Mercury Nashville
- Producer: Carson Chamberlain; Keith Stegall

Mark Wills chronology
Permanently (2000)	Loving Every Minute (2001)	Greatest Hits (2002)

Singles from Loving Every Minute
- 1. "Loving Every Minute" Released: April 23, 2001; 2. "I'm Not Gonna Do Anything Without You" Released: November 12, 2001

Professional ratings
Review scores
Source	Rating
AllMusic	3/5 stars

Loving Every Minute is the fourth studio album by American country music artist Mark Wills. Released in 2001 on Mercury Nashville Records, the album produced two singles: the title track and "I'm Not Gonna Do Anything Without You" (a duet with Jamie O'Neal), which peaked at numbers 18 and 31, respectively, on the Billboard Hot Country Singles & Tracks chart. The album itself reached number 10 on the Billboard Top Country Albums chart and number 93 on the Billboard 200.

== Background ==
The album's title track, written by Tom Shapiro, Michael White and Monty Criswell, was its first single as well. It peaked at number 18 on the country chart in 2002. Following this song was the only other single, "I'm Not Gonna Do Anything Without You", which was co-written by Randy VanWarmer and Pirates of the Mississippi member Rich Alves. This song was also included on O'Neal's debut album Shiver.

"Somebody" can also be found on Reba McEntire's 2003 album Room to Breathe. McEntire's rendition of the latter song was a Number One hit for her in 2004. Also, John Berry recorded "The Balloon Song" and released it as a single in 2007 from his album Those Were the Days.

== Track listing ==
No.	Title	Writer(s)	Length
1.	"Loving Every Minute"	Tom Shapiro, Michael White, Monty Criswell	4:18
2.	"One of These Days"	Tim Nichols, Jeff Stevens	3:47
3.	"In My Heaven"	Rivers Rutherford, Bobby Pinson	3:24
4.	"Back on Earth"	Skip Ewing, Donny Kees	3:49
5.	"I Hate Chicago"	Chris DuBois, Lee Thomas Miller	3:29
6.	"Universe"	Tommy Sims, Ty Lacy	4:17
7.	"Somebody"	Annie Tate, Sam Tate, Dave Berg	3:50
8.	"I'll Be Around"	Nichols, Craig Wiseman	3:18
9.	"Lost in a Kiss"	Steve Bogard, Brett Beavers	4:29
10.	"The Balloon Song"	Casey Beathard	3:48
11.	"Love Can't"	Neil Thrasher, Kelly Shiver	3:32
12.	"I'm Not Gonna Do Anything Without You" (duet with Jamie O'Neal)	Randy VanWarmer, Rich Alves	4:27
Total length:			46:35

== Personnel ==
- Mark Wills – vocals
- Gary Prim – keyboards, acoustic piano
- Gordon Mote – keyboards (3, 5, 8, 11)
- Brady Barnett – keyboards (12)
- Keith Stegall – keyboards (12)
- Brent Mason – electric guitars
- John Willis – acoustic guitars (1–11)
- B. James Lowery – acoustic guitar (12)
- Paul Franklin – steel guitar
- Scotty Sanders – dobro
- David Smith – bass (1–11)
- Glenn Worf – bass (12)
- Eddie Bayers – drums
- Scott Williamson – drum programming (1–11)
- John Kelton – drum programming (12)
- Eric Darken – percussion (12)
- Stuart Duncan – fiddle
- Aubrey Haynie – fiddle, mandolin
- John Wesley Ryles – backing vocals
- Jamie O'Neal – vocals (12)

=== Production ===
- Carson Chamberlain – producer (1–11), co-producer (12)
- Keith Stegall – producer (12)
- John Kelton – recording, mixing, additional recording
- Steve Harbinson – recording assistant, mix assistant
- Matt Rovey – recording assistant, mix assistant
- Hank Williams – mastering at MasterMix (Nashville, Tennessee)
- Brian Wright – production assistant
- Jim Kemp – art direction
- Virginia Team – art direction
- Chris Ferrara – design
- Robert Ascroft – photography
- Jennifer Kemp – stylist
- Erin Zoufal – hair, make-up
- Star Ray Management – management

== Charts ==
Chart (2001)	Peak position
US Billboard 200	93
US Top Country Albums (Billboard)	10
