= Allen Shamblin =

American country music songwriter (born 1959)

- Born: James Allen Shamblin II; May 13, 1959 (age 67); Tennessee
- Origin: Texas
- Occupation: songwriter
- Website: allenshamblin.com

Allen Shamblin is a country music songwriter who was born in Tennessee, and was brought up in Huffman, Texas.

== Biography ==
After graduating from Sam Houston State University he worked in Austin as a real estate appraiser. In 1987, he quit his job and moved to Nashville to pursue a career as a songwriter. He supported himself by parking cars and working in a warehouse. During live shows he tells stories about his parents sending him money so he could survive. In 1990, Randy Travis took a song Shamblin wrote, about his great-grandfather, to number one on the country charts. After "He Walked on Water", he followed it up with four more number one songs including: "We Were in Love," "In This Life" and "Walk on Faith." He often co-writes with other songwriters. He co-wrote with Steve Seskin for number one hits with "Life's a Dance" and "Don't Laugh at Me." Don't Laugh at Me was a hit for Mark Wills and was later recorded by Peter, Paul and Mary resulting in a school program designed to teach children tolerance and prevent bullying in the playground. His biggest song, "I Can't Make You Love Me," was co-written with Mike Reid and was a hit for Bonnie Raitt. His song "The House that Built Me", co-written with Tom Douglas, was recorded by Miranda Lambert and she won the Best Female Country Vocal Performance Grammy for the recording.

Shamblin was inducted into the Texas Heritage Songwriters Association Hall of Fame on March 1, 2009, at the Paramount Theater in Austin, Texas. In 2011 he was inducted into the Nashville Songwriters Hall of Fame.

== Songs ==
- "Don't Laugh at Me" (Mark Wills)
- "He Walked on Water" (Randy Travis)
- "Thinkin' Problem" (David Ball)
- "I Can't Make You Love Me" (Bonnie Raitt)
- "Why" (Rascal Flatts)
- "The House That Built Me" (Miranda Lambert)
- "Where the Blacktop Ends" (Keith Urban)
- "Life's a Dance" (John Michael Montgomery)
- "In This Life", "Man of My Word" (Collin Raye)
- "What I'm For" (Pat Green)
- "How They Remember You" (Rascal Flatts)
- "Threads Of Gold" (The Marcy Brothers)
- "We Were in Love" (Toby Keith)
- "Poison" (George Strait)
- "Gravy" (Tim McGraw)
- "My Heart's Not a Hotel" (Brooks & Dunn)
