= Wish You Were Here (Mark Wills song) =

Single by Mark Wills

from the album Wish You Were Here
- B-side: "Emily Harper"
- Released: January 11, 1999
- Length: 4:00
- Label: Mercury Nashville
- Songwriters: Skip Ewing, Debbie Moore, Bill Anderson
- Producer: Carson Chamberlain

Mark Wills singles chronology
"Don't Laugh at Me" (1998)	"Wish You Were Here" (1999)	"She's in Love" (1999)

"Wish You Were Here" is a song written by Bill Anderson, Skip Ewing, and Debbie Moore, and recorded by American country music artist Mark Wills. The song reached the top of the Billboard Hot Country Singles & Tracks (now Hot Country Songs) chart. It was released in January 1999 as the third single and title track from his album of the same name. The song was also Wills's first Billboard number-one single.

== Background ==
Wills told Billboard magazine that it while some people say it is a sad song, "it's really a very positive, optimistic love song about life after death."

== Chart positions ==
"Wish You Were Here" debuted at number 54 on the U.S. Billboard Hot Country Singles & Tracks for the week of January 23, 1999.

Chart (1999)	Peak position
Canada Country Singles (RPM)	4
US Billboard Hot 100	34
US Hot Country Songs (Billboard)	1

=== Year-end charts ===
Chart (1999)	Position
Canada Country Tracks (RPM)	43
US Country Songs (Billboard)	15
