= Michael White (singer) =

American singer-songwriter

- Born: Larry Michael White
- Origin: Knoxville, Tennessee, United States
- Genres: Country
- Occupation: Singer-songwriter
- Instrument: Vocals
- Years active: 1992–present
- Label: Reprise

Larry Michael White is an American country music artist. The son of songwriter L. E. White, who has written for Conway Twitty, White had a song he wrote recorded when he was still a teenager. "You Make It Hard To Take the Easy Way Out" appeared on the B-side to Twitty's hit "You've Never Been This Far Before".

White was later signed to Reprise Records in 1992, releasing his debut album Familiar Ground that year. This album produced three chart singles for him on the Billboard Hot Country Singles & Tracks (now Hot Country Songs) charts, including the No. 32 "Professional Fool." The album was produced by Robert Byrne.

White also was a writer on "Rock-a-Bye Heart" for Dana McVicker, "Fighting Fire with Fire" for Davis Daniel, "Loving Every Minute" for Mark Wills, "The Baby" for Blake Shelton, and "Kiss You in the Morning" by Michael Ray, the latter two of which reached No. 1 on the country singles charts. "Loving Every Minute" and "The Baby" both earned White ASCAP awards for being among the most performed country songs of the year, in 2002 and 2003 respectively.

== Discography ==
=== Albums ===
Title	Album details
Familiar Ground	Release date: 1992; Label: Reprise Records

=== Singles ===
Year	Single	Peak positions		Album
Year	Single	US Country	CAN Country	Album
1992	"Professional Fool"	32	—	Familiar Ground
1992	"Familiar Ground"	43	55	Familiar Ground
1992	"She Likes to Dance"	63	—	Familiar Ground
1993	"Country Conscience"	—	—	—N/a
"—" denotes releases that did not chart

=== Music videos ===
Year	Video	Director
1992	"Professional Fool"	
1992	"Familiar Ground"	Rob Lindsay
