= Don't Laugh at Me =

Single by Mark Wills

from the album Wish You Were Here
- B-side: "I Can't Live with Myself"
- Released: July 13, 1998
- Genre: Country
- Length: 3:36
- Label: Mercury Nashville
- Songwriters: Steve Seskin; Allen Shamblin
- Producer: Carson Chamberlain

Mark Wills singles chronology
"I Do (Cherish You)" (1998)	"Don't Laugh at Me" (1998)	"Wish You Were Here" (1999)

"Don't Laugh at Me" is a song written by Allen Shamblin and Steve Seskin, and recorded by American country music artist Mark Wills. It was released in July 1998 as the second single from album Wish You Were Here. Like "I Do (Cherish You)" before it, "Don't Laugh at Me" was a number 2 hit on the Billboard country charts. The song received Country Music Association nominations for Country Music Association's Single, Song and Video of the Year in 1998.

== Background ==
Allen Shamblin was inspired to write the song after his school-aged daughter came home and confided that she was being teased by her peers because of her freckles.

== Content ==
The song is a ballad in which various characters, from teased children to a homeless man on a street corner, seek acceptance from those around them.

Wills has received letters from teachers and students who have said that they can identify with the song's story. According to him, "everyone can relate to [the song]…Everyone at some point in their life has been picked on, made fun of or put down." He told Billboard magazine that the song is "one of the strongest songs I've ever recorded in terms of dealing with life in general."

== Music video ==
The music video was directed by Jim Hershleder and premiered in mid-1998. It features Wills performing the song at a school playground at night, witnessing scenes of bullying as depicted in the song.

== Chart performance ==
"Don't Laugh at Me" debuted at number 69 on the U.S. Billboard Hot Country Singles & Tracks for the week of July 18, 1998. The song peaked at number 2 on the Hot Country Songs chart on October 10, 1998, for two weeks and was kept out of the top spot by "Where the Green Grass Grows" by Tim McGraw.

Chart (1998)	Peak position
Canada Country Singles (RPM)	2
US Billboard Hot 100	73
US Hot Country Songs (Billboard)	2

=== Year-end charts ===
Chart (1998)	Position
Canada Country Tracks (RPM)	29
US Country Songs (Billboard)	26

== Peter, Paul and Mary version ==
Peter Yarrow attended a performance by co-writer Seskin at the Kerrville Folk Festival, which led to his recording the song with Peter, Paul and Mary. Their version appeared as the sole new recording on their compilation album Songs of Conscience and Concern. The song helped inspire Yarrow to found the non-profit organization Operation Respect, promoting tolerance and civility programs in education. The organization distributes curriculum programs under the "Don't Laugh At Me" name. In conjunction with this program, the song has been made into a children's book including an afterword by Yarrow. Part of the proceeds from the book go to Operation Respect.

== Lagwagon version ==
In 2014 Lagwagon recorded a punk rock version of this song which was published as "bonus track" from their record Hang.
