= Mark Wills =

American singer (born 1973)

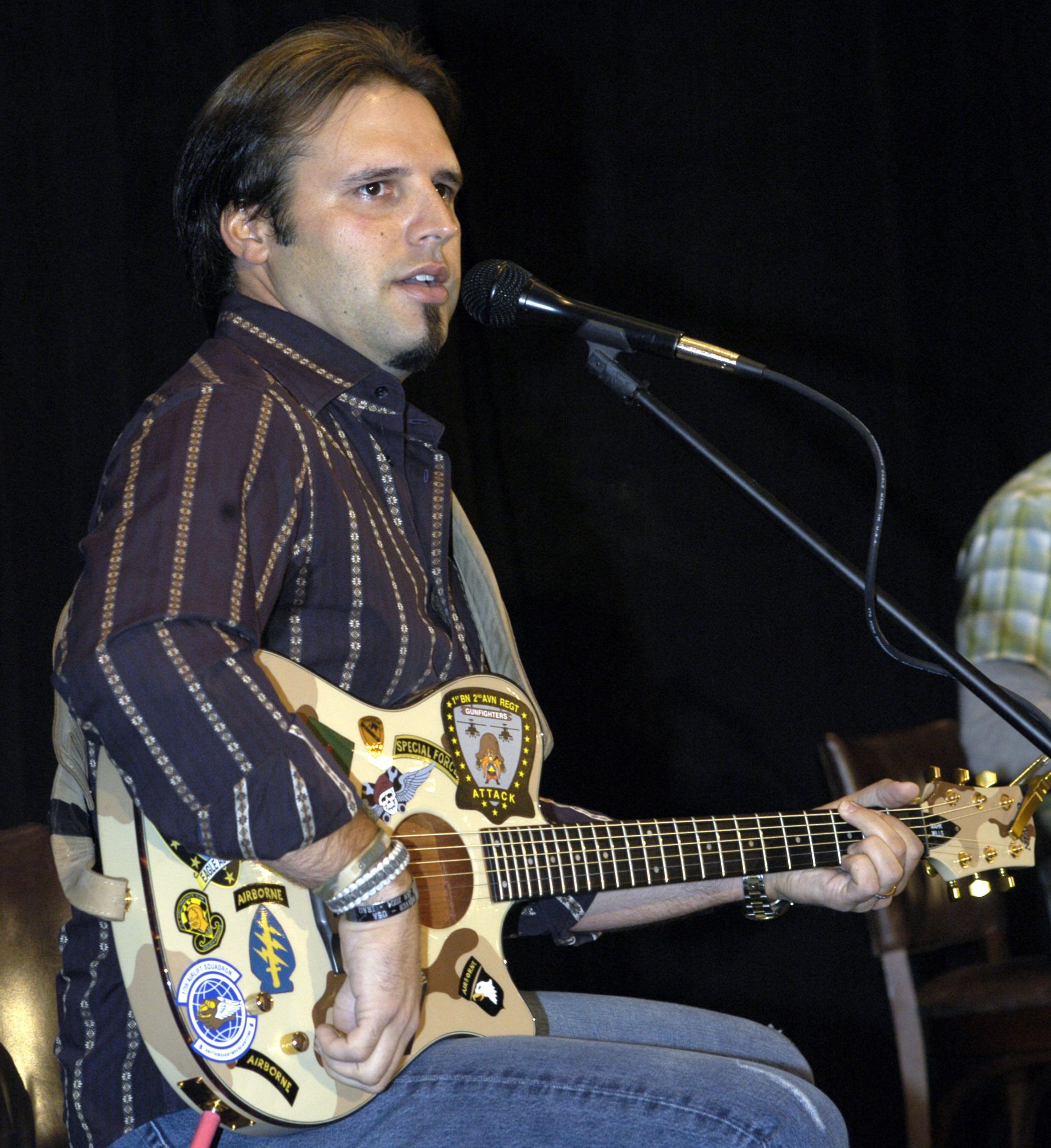
- Wills performing at the Military Child Education Coalition conference in Atlanta on June 29, 2005.

Background information
- Born: Daryl Mark Williams; August 8, 1973 (age 53); Blue Ridge, Georgia, U.S.
- Origin: Blue Ridge, Georgia, U.S.
- Genre: Country
- Occupation: Singer
- Instruments: Vocals, guitar
- Years active: 1996–present
- Labels: Mercury Nashville, Equity Music Group, Tenacity, Big Red
- Website: markwills.com

Mark Wills (born Daryl Mark Williams; August 8, 1973) is an American country music artist. Signed to Mercury Records between 1996 and 2003, he released five studio albums for the label – Mark Wills, Wish You Were Here, Permanently, Loving Every Minute, and And the Crowd Goes Wild – as well as a greatest hits package. In that same timespan, he charted sixteen singles on the Billboard country charts, all of which made the top 40. After leaving Mercury in 2003, he signed to Equity Music Group and charted three more singles. Two of these were later included on his sixth studio album, Familiar Stranger, which was released on the Tenacity label in 2008.

Of his albums, Wish You Were Here is the best-selling, with a platinum certification from the Recording Industry Association of America. This album's title track and the late 2002-early 2003 release "19 Somethin'" both reached No. 1; on the Hot Country Songs charts. Besides these, six more of his singles have reached top 10 on the chart: his debut single "Jacob's Ladder", "Places I've Never Been", "I Do (Cherish You)", "Don't Laugh at Me", "She's in Love", and a cover version of Brian McKnight's "Back at One". Two songs originally recorded by Wills, "Somebody" and "What Hurts the Most", were later hit singles for Reba McEntire, Jo O'Meara, Rascal Flatts, and Cascada respectively.

On December 21, 2018, Wills was invited to become the 218th member of the Grand Ole Opry. He was inducted on January 11, 2019.

== Early life ==
Wills was born in Blue Ridge, Georgia.

== Career ==
In his teenaged years, Wills played in garage bands, taking inspiration from rock groups such as Bon Jovi. During his young adulthood, however, he began to take an interest in country music. He entered a local talent contest in Marietta, Georgia, at age 17, and after winning the contest, he began to perform locally. From there, he went to work as a demo singer in Atlanta, Georgia, before doing the same in Nashville, Tennessee. While in Nashville, he was discovered by record producers Carson Chamberlain and Keith Stegall, who helped him sign to a recording contract with Mercury Records Nashville.

Wills's self-titled debut album was released in 1996 under the production of Chamberlain and Stegall. Its lead-off single, "Jacob's Ladder", went to number six on the country charts. "High Low and in Between", the B-side to "Jacob's Ladder", was the next single, reaching number 33. Finishing off the single releases was the number-five "Places I've Never Been". Despite the success of its first and third singles, the album did not sell well, and it peaked at number 38 on the country albums charts.

Wish You Were Here, Wills's second album, was his most commercially successful, earning a platinum certification from the Recording Industry Association of America. The lead-off single "I Do (Cherish You)" and its follow-up, "Don't Laugh at Me", both reached number two on the country charts, with the former bringing him to the Billboard Hot 100 for the first time. Following the pair of number two-peaking songs was the album's title track. Co-written by Bill Anderson, Skip Ewing, and Debbie Moore, it became Wills's first number-one country hit in 1999. Later that year, the boy band 98 Degrees covered "I Do (Cherish You)" on their album 98 Degrees and Rising. Following "Wish You Were Here" was "She's in Love", the final single from Wish You Were Here, which peaked at number seven. In 1998, Wills received an Academy of Country Music award for Top New Male Vocalist.

=== 2000–2003 ===
In 2000, he voiced the character of Huckleberry Finn in MGM's animated remake of Tom Sawyer, Wills's only film role to date. Also for the film, Wills and Lee Ann Womack, who plays the singing voice of Becky in the film, sing the end title song "Never Ever and Forever" as a duet.

Wills's eighth chart entry was a cover of R&B singer Brian McKnight's 1998 hit single "Back at One". This cover was a top-five country hit for Wills in early 2000 and the first single from his third album, Permanently. This album was Wills's highest entry on the country albums charts, peaking at number three. Following "Back at One" was another R&B cover, this time of Brandy's 1999 single "Almost Doesn't Count". This cover reached the top 20, and was followed by "I Want to Know (Everything There Is to Know About You)", which reached number 33. Permanently was certified gold by the RIAA. Unlike his previous albums, this album was produced entirely by Carson Chamberlain, as Stegall had left Mercury in 2000.

Loving Every Minute was the title of Wills's fourth studio album and its lead-off single. This song, co-written by Michael White, only peaked at number 18, however, and the album's other single – the Jamie O'Neal duet "I'm Not Gonna Do Anything Without You", which was also on O'Neal's debut album Shiver – reached number 31. Also included on this album was the song "Somebody", which later became a number-one hit in 2004 when Reba McEntire recorded it for her 2003 album Room to Breathe.

Wills's biggest chart hit, "19 Somethin'", was released in late 2002. It topped the country charts in early 2003, and stayed at number one for six weeks. The song was also his highest Hot 100 entry, peaking at number 23. This song was the first of two newly recorded songs on his 2003 greatest hits album, which reprised all of his chart singles to that point except "High Low and in Between" and "I Want to Know (Everything There Is to Know About You)". The other new song on this album, "When You Think of Me", was a number-28 country hit in early 2003. Wills produced these two new tracks with Chris Lindsey.

And the Crowd Goes Wild, his fifth studio album, came later in 2003. This was his first full studio album, which he co-produced, again doing so with Chris Lindsey. Although the album itself peaked at number five on the Billboard Top Country Albums chart, its two singles only made the middle and lower top-40 regions on the Hot Country Songs chart. Its Jeffrey Steele-penned country rock and country rap-generated title track was the lead-off single, reaching number 29 on the country charts. Following it was "That's a Woman", which stopped at number 40. Like his previous studio release, this album included a song that later became a number-one hit for another artist: "What Hurts the Most", which was a number-one country and adult contemporary hit for the group Rascal Flatts when they covered it on their 2006 album Me and My Gang. This song was also a single for Jo O'Meara in 2005 and Cascada in 2007. Wills's own rendition was a minor hit on the Hot Digital Songs charts in 2006. Also included on And the Crowd Goes Wild was a cover of Ronnie Milsap's hit "Prisoner of the Highway", recorded as a duet with Milsap.

=== 2006–present ===
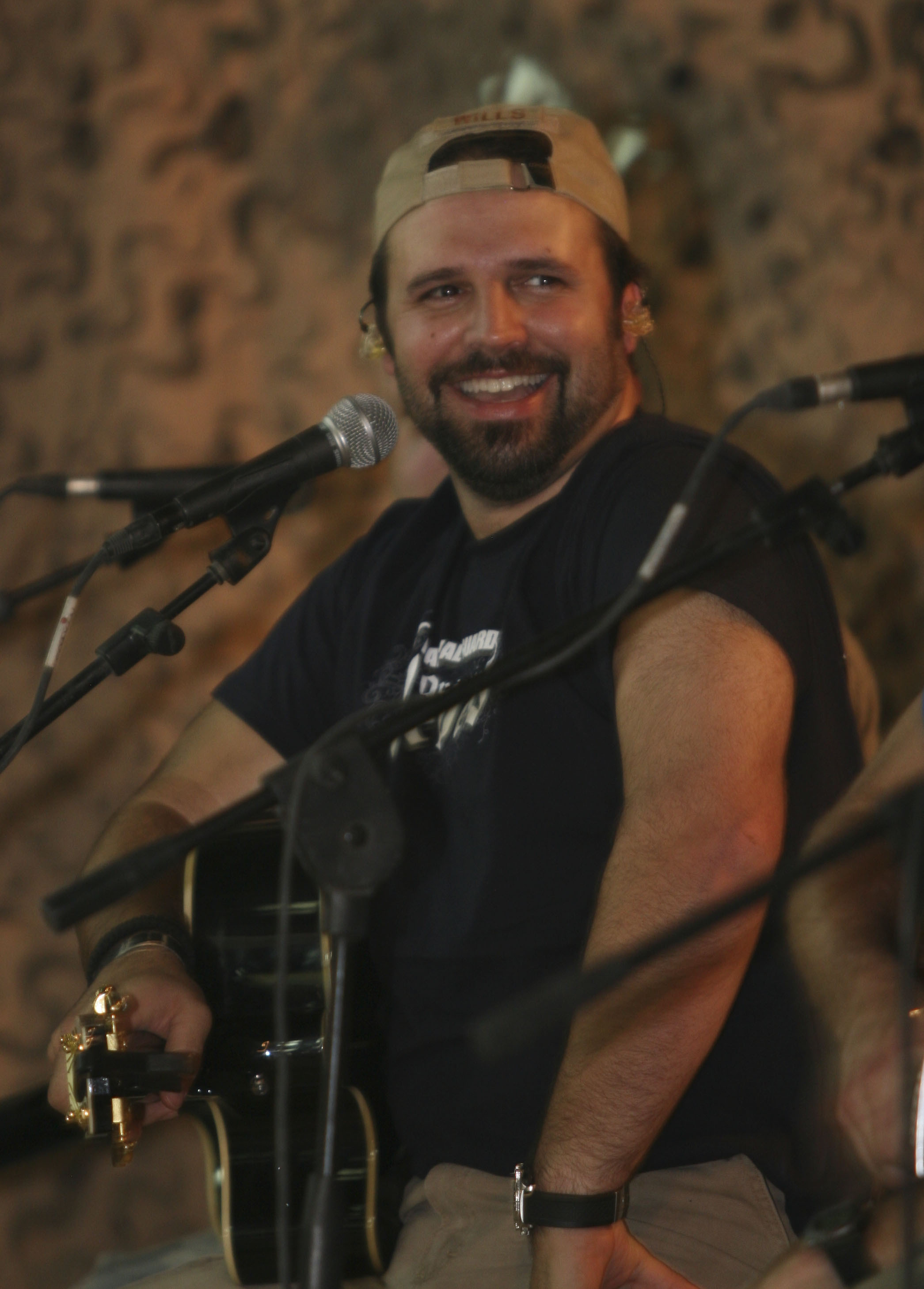
Mark Wills in 2008

Due to the poor performance of And the Crowd Goes Wild, Wills left Mercury in 2004. In 2004, Wills also recorded a cover of Elvin Bishop's "Fooled Around and Fell in Love" for the southern rock tribute album Southern Rock Country Style. He did not record again until country singer Clint Black signed him to his Equity Music Group label in 2006. Wills's first release for the label was "Hank", which peaked at number 49 and was never included on an album. His first album for the label, titled Familiar Stranger, was originally slated for release in September 2007, and was repeatedly pushed back due to the poor chart performance of "Take It All Out on Me" and "Days of Thunder." Tenacity Records then acquired the album and released it in 2008, issuing "The Things We Forget" as its third single. After this song came "Entertaining Angels", co-written by Willie Mack. In late 2009, he released then a fifth single, "Crazy White Boy", written by Brett James and Blair Daly. Wills released the compilation album 2nd Time Around in July 2009, which comprises re-recordings of several Mercury singles.

Wills released a new single in January 2011 called "Looking for America", written by Bernie Nelson, Philip Douglas, and Jeremy Bussey. It served as the title track to his 2011 album of the same name, released June 21, 2011, from Big Red Records and Tenacity Records.

He was invited by Vince Gill to become the 218th member of the Grand Ole Opry on December 21, 2018, and was inducted on January 11, 2019

== Personal life ==
In 1996, Wills married his wife, Kelly, whom he met at Atlanta's music club, Buckboard. They have two daughters.

In November 2010, Wills was hospitalized for surgery after his large intestine ruptured. He was told that had he waited any longer to seek medical help, he would have died.

== Discography ==
- 1996: Mark Wills
- 1998: Wish You Were Here
- 2000: Permanently
- 2001: Loving Every Minute
- 2003: And the Crowd Goes Wild
- 2008: Familiar Stranger
- 2011: Looking for America

== Awards and nominations ==
=== Academy of Country Music Awards ===
Year	Nominee / work	Award	Result
1999	Mark Wills	Top New Male Vocalist	Won
1999	"Don't Laugh at Me"	Song of the Year	Nominated
2003	"19 Somethin'"	Single Record of the Year	Nominated

=== Country Music Association Awards ===
Year	Nominee / work	Award	Result
1999	"Don't Laugh at Me"	Single of the Year	Nominated
1999	"Don't Laugh at Me"	Video of the Year	Nominated

== Filmography ==
Film
Year	Film	Role	Notes
2000	Tom Sawyer	Huckleberry Finn	Direct-to-video
