= Greatest Hits (Tim McGraw album) =

Greatest hits album by Tim McGraw
- Released: November 21, 2000
- Genre: Country
- Length: 55:19
- Label: Curb
- Producer: Byron Gallimore; Tim McGraw; James Stroud

Tim McGraw chronology
A Place in the Sun (1999)	Greatest Hits (2000)	Set This Circus Down (2001)

Professional ratings
Review scores
Source	Rating
Allmusic	4.5/5 stars

Greatest Hits is the first compilation album of American country music artist Tim McGraw. It was released on November 21, 2000, and reached #1 on the Billboard Country album charts & #4 on the Billboard Top 200 album charts. The album features material from all of McGraw's albums at the time, with the exception of his self-titled 1993 debut album. It also features the song "Let's Make Love" (a duet with his wife Faith Hill), from Hill's 1999 album Breathe. It sold six million copies United States till 2008.

== Track listing ==
No.	Title	Writer(s)	Length
1.	"Indian Outlaw"	John D. Loudermilk, Jumpin' Gene Simmons, Tommy Barnes	3:02
2.	"Don't Take the Girl"	Craig Martin, Larry W. Johnson	4:09
3.	"She Never Lets It Go to Her Heart"	Chris Waters, Tom Shapiro	3:06
4.	"I Like It, I Love It"	Markus Hall, Jeb Stuart Anderson, Steve Dukes	3:25
5.	"Just to See You Smile"	Mark Nesler, Tony Martin	3:35
6.	"It's Your Love" (duet with Faith Hill)	Stephony Smith	3:47
7.	"Where the Green Grass Grows"	Jess Leary, Craig Wiseman	3:21
8.	"For a Little While"	Steve Mandile, Jerry Vandiver, Phil Vassar	3:33
9.	"Please Remember Me"	Rodney Crowell, Will Jennings	4:55
10.	"Something Like That"	Rick Ferrell, Keith Follesé	3:03
11.	"My Best Friend"	Bill Luther, Aimee Mayo	4:39
12.	"Maybe We Should Just Sleep on It"	Jerry Laseter, Kerry Kurt Phillips	3:56
13.	"Down on the Farm"	Laseter, Phillips	2:58
14.	"My Next Thirty Years"	Vassar	3:37
15.	"Let's Make Love" (duet with Faith Hill)	Chris Lindsey, Marv Green, Luther, Mayo	4:12

== Singles ==
The only single released from this album is "Let's Make Love". It reached #6 on the U.S. Country Charts and #54 on the U.S. Hot 100, and was also included on Faith Hill's Breathe album.

== Charts ==
=== Weekly charts ===
Chart (2000)	Peak position
Australian Albums (ARIA)	87
US Billboard 200	4
US Top Country Albums (Billboard)	1

=== Year-end charts ===
Year-end chart performance for Greatest Hits by Tim McGraw
Chart (2000)	Position
Canadian Albums (Nielsen SoundScan)	131

Chart (2001)	Position
Canadian Albums (Nielsen SoundScan)	115
Canadian Country Albums (Nielsen SoundScan)	7
US Billboard 200	21
US Top Country Albums (Billboard)	1

Chart (2002)	Position
Canadian Country Albums (Nielsen SoundScan)	24
US Billboard 200	111
US Top Country Albums (Billboard)	13

Chart (2020)	Position
US Top Country Albums (Billboard)	95

== Certifications ==
Region	Certification	Certified units/sales
Canada (Music Canada)	2× Platinum	200,000^{^}
United States (RIAA)	6× Platinum	6,000,000^{^}
^{^} Shipments figures based on certification alone.
