= There You'll Be (album) =

Greatest hits album by Faith Hill
- Released: October 8, 2001
- Genre: Country pop
- Length: 56:29
- Label: Warner Bros. Nashville
- Producer: Byron Gallimore; Faith Hill; Dann Huff

Faith Hill chronology
Breathe (1999)	There You'll Be (2001)	Cry (2002)

Singles from There You'll Be
- 1. "There You'll Be" Released: May 21, 2001; 2. "Breathe (Remix)" Released: October 1, 2001

Professional ratings
Review scores
Source	Rating
AllMusic	4.5/5 stars
The Rolling Stone Album Guide	2.5/5 stars

There You'll Be is an international greatest hits album by country music artist Faith Hill. It was released on October 8, 2001, in Europe and Australia only following the success of her singles from her past two albums, Breathe (1999) and Faith (1998). The name of the album comes from the single "There You'll Be", which Hill recorded for the movie Pearl Harbor.

"There You'll Be" was released as the lead single on May 21, 2001, to country radio before being released throughout June 2001 in Europe. The song received critical acclaim, with praise being towards Hill's vocals. The song became her highest-peaking single internationally, peaking at number three in the United Kingdom and the top ten in 14 other countries. Remixed by English electronic duo Tin Tin Out, Hill's previously released single "Breathe" was reissued on October 1, 2001. "Breathe", in its initial release, was a moderate top forty hit in seven countries. The reissue did peak at number 36 on the UK Singles Chart.

== Content ==
There You'll Be consists of songs from Faith and Breathe, most of which are included in their "radio" or "pop" remixes. The compilation opens up with the title track, which was written by famed songwriter Diane Warren and recorded for the soundtrack of the 2001 Michael Bay film Pearl Harbor. "This Kiss", Hill's first crossover single from 1998, is followed after, included in its "radio version" which removes the country elements. "Breathe" is followed, with the version included on There You'll Be being remixed by Tin Tin Out. The next song included is "The Way You Love Me", which like "Breathe" was specifically remixed for this compilation by the UK-based dance producers Love to Infinity; the Australian version of There You'll Be includes the album version. "Let Me Let Go" is next, with the version included being the pop remix used for the film Message in a Bottle. The Erma Franklin cover "Piece of My Heart", which Hill made a country number one in 1994, is included in its international pop remix. Three non-singles from Faith are included: "You Give Me Love", "My Wild Frontier", and "Love Will Always Win"; the latter was the title of the international edition of the album and was originally supposed to appear before being cut from the project and later being recorded by Garth Brooks and Trisha Yearwood. The top forty country song "There Will Come a Day" from Breathe was also included. A cover of the Amy Grant song "Somewhere Down the Road" was recorded specifically for the compilation. The classic cover "Over the Rainbow" was recorded. The final song included on the standard edition of There You'll Be is the pop version of "Breathe". The album track "If I Should Fall Behind", which was included on Breathe, was exclusively on the Australian edition.

== Track listing ==
There You'll Be track listing
No.	Title	Writer(s)	Length
1.	"There You'll Be"	Diane Warren	3:40
2.	"This Kiss" (Radio version)	Chapman, Lerner, Roboff	3:17
3.	"Breathe" (Tin Tin Out Radio Mix)	Bentley, Lamar	3:55
4.	"The Way You Love Me" (Love to Infinity Edit)	Delaney, Follesé	2:59
5.	"Let Me Let Go" (Movie version)	Diamond, Morgan	4:09
6.	"Piece of My Heart" (Pop remix)	Berns, Ragovoy	3:39
7.	"If My Heart Had Wings" (Single remix)	Knobloch, Roboff	3:35
8.	"There Will Come a Day"	Lindsey, Luther, Mayo	4:15
9.	"Love Will Always Win"	Kennedy, Kirkpatrick	5:08
10.	"My Wild Frontier"	Golde, Lerner, Malamet	4:59
11.	"You Give Me Love"	Berg, Photoglo, Stinson	3:37
12.	"Somewhere Down the Road"	Grant, Kirkpatrick	5:38
13.	"Over the Rainbow"	Arlen, Harburg	3:15
14.	"Breathe" (Pop version)	Bentley, Lamar	4:09
Total length:			56:29

Australian edition
No.	Title	Writer(s)	Length
4.	"The Way You Love Me"	Delaney, Follesé	3:06
15.	"The Way You Love Me" (Love to Infinity Edit)	Delaney, Follesé	2:59
16.	"If I Should Fall Behind"	Springsteen	4:32
Total length:			64:07

== Personnel ==
- Larry Beaird – acoustic guitar
- Stephanie Bentley – background vocals
- Bekka Bramlett – background vocals
- Mike Brignardello – bass guitar
- Larry Byrom – acoustic guitar
- David Campbell – string arrangements, conductor
- Beth Nielsen Chapman – background vocals
- Duke Quartet – strings
- Glen Duncan – fiddle
- Stuart Duncan – fiddle
- Felipe Elgueta – synthesizer programming
- Tabitha Fair – background vocals
- David Foster – keyboards
- Paul Franklin – steel guitar
- Byron Gallimore – synthesizer strings
- Sonny Garrish – steel guitar
- Duane Hamilton – background vocals
- Camille Harrison – background vocals
- Aubrey Haynie – fiddle
- Faith Hill – lead vocals
- Dann Huff – electric guitar
- Michael Landau – electric guitar
- Andy Lee – programming
- Paul Leim – drums
- Love to Infinity – instrumentation on track 4
- B. James Lowry – acoustic guitar, electric guitar
- Terry McMillan – percussion
- Brent Mason – electric guitar
- Gene Miller – background vocals
- Jamie Muhoberac – programming
- Steve Nathan – keyboards, organ, piano, synthesizer
- Richard Pagano – drums
- Richard Page – background vocals
- Kim Parent – background vocals
- Sherree Ford-Payne – background vocals
- Tim Pierce – electric guitar
- John "J.R." Robinson – drums
- Chris Rodriguez – background vocals
- William Ross – string arrangements
- Tony Shanahan – bass guitar
- Ira Siegel – acoustic guitar
- Gary Smith – piano
- Sound of Africa – background vocals
- Joe Spivey – fiddle
- Kenneth "Scat" Springs – background vocals
- Michael Thompson – electric guitar
- Rosaline Thompson – background vocals
- Percy Travis III – background vocals
- John Willis – electric guitar
- Dennis Wilson – background vocals
- Lonnie Wilson – drums
- Glenn Worf – bass guitar
- Curtis Wright – background vocals
- Curtis Young – background vocals

== Charts ==
=== Weekly charts ===
Weekly chart performance for There You'll Be
Chart (2001–02)	Peak position
Australian Albums (ARIA)	5
Austrian Albums (Ö3 Austria)	11
Belgian Albums (Ultratop Flanders)	8
Danish Albums (Hitlisten)	5
Dutch Albums (Album Top 100)	83
European Top 100 Albums (Music & Media)	14
Finnish Albums (Suomen virallinen lista)	24
German Albums (Offizielle Top 100)	14
Irish Albums (IRMA)	3
New Zealand Albums (RMNZ)	16
Norwegian Albums (VG-lista)	12
Portuguese Albums (AFP)	18
Scottish Albums (OCC)	4
Swedish Albums (Sverigetopplistan)	10
Swiss Albums (Schweizer Hitparade)	13
UK Albums (OCC)	6

=== Year-end charts ===
Year-end chart performance for There You'll Be
Chart (2001)	Position
Australian Albums (ARIA)	45
Swedish Albums (Sverigetopplistan)	85
UK Albums (OCC)	81

== Certifications ==
Certifications for There You'll Be
Region	Certification	Certified units/sales
Australia (ARIA)	5× Platinum	350,000^{^}
Denmark (IFPI Danmark)	Gold	25,000^{^}
New Zealand (RMNZ)	Gold	7,500^{^}
Portugal (AFP)	Platinum	40,000^{^}
Sweden (GLF)	Gold	40,000^{^}
United Kingdom (BPI)	Platinum	300,000^{*}
^{*} Sales figures based on certification alone.^{^} Shipments figures based on certification alone.
