= List of RPM number-one country singles of 2000 =

These are the Canadian number-one country songs of 2000, per the RPM Country Tracks chart.

Note that RPM ceased publication in November 2000.

Issue date	Title	Artist	Source
January 10	Breathe	Faith Hill	
January 17	Cowboy Take Me Away	Dixie Chicks	
January 24	Cowboy Take Me Away	Dixie Chicks	
January 31	Smile	Lonestar	
February 7	Smile	Lonestar	
February 14	Breathe	Faith Hill	
February 21	Breathe	Faith Hill	
February 28	Back at One	Mark Wills	
March 6	Back at One	Mark Wills	
March 13	How Do You Like Me Now?!	Toby Keith	
March 20	How Do You Like Me Now?!	Toby Keith	
March 27	Been There	Clint Black with Steve Wariner	
April 3	Been There	Clint Black with Steve Wariner	(Note: April 3 chart is missing from the chart archives; this position is determined from the "last week" column on the April 10 chart.)
April 10	Carlene	Phil Vassar	
April 17	Carlene	Phil Vassar	
April 24	Carlene	Phil Vassar	
May 1	Been There	Clint Black with Steve Wariner	
May 8	Been There	Clint Black with Steve Wariner	
May 15	The Way You Love Me	Faith Hill	
May 22	The Way You Love Me	Faith Hill	
May 29	Couldn't Last a Moment	Collin Raye	
June 5	Couldn't Last a Moment	Collin Raye	
June 12	Yes!	Chad Brock	
June 19	I Hope You Dance	Lee Ann Womack with Sons of the Desert	
June 26	I Hope You Dance	Lee Ann Womack with Sons of the Desert	
July 3	I Hope You Dance	Lee Ann Womack with Sons of the Desert	
July 10	Some Things Never Change	Tim McGraw	
July 17	Some Things Never Change	Tim McGraw	
July 24	What About Now	Lonestar	
July 31	What About Now	Lonestar	
August 7	What About Now	Lonestar	
August 14	What About Now	Lonestar	
August 21	That's the Way	Jo Dee Messina	
August 28	That's the Way	Jo Dee Messina	
September 4	That's the Way	Jo Dee Messina	
September 11	That's the Way	Jo Dee Messina	
September 18	What About Now	Lonestar	
September 25	That's the Way	Jo Dee Messina	
October 2	That's the Way	Jo Dee Messina	
October 9	That's the Way	Jo Dee Messina	
October 16	Go On	George Strait	
October 23	Go On	George Strait	(Note: No chart was published on 23 October, so a week's gap is inferred.)
October 30	The Little Girl	John Michael Montgomery	
November 6	The Little Girl	John Michael Montgomery	

== See also ==
- 2000 in music
- List of number-one country singles of 2000 (U.S.)
