= List of Hot Country Singles & Tracks number ones of 2000 =

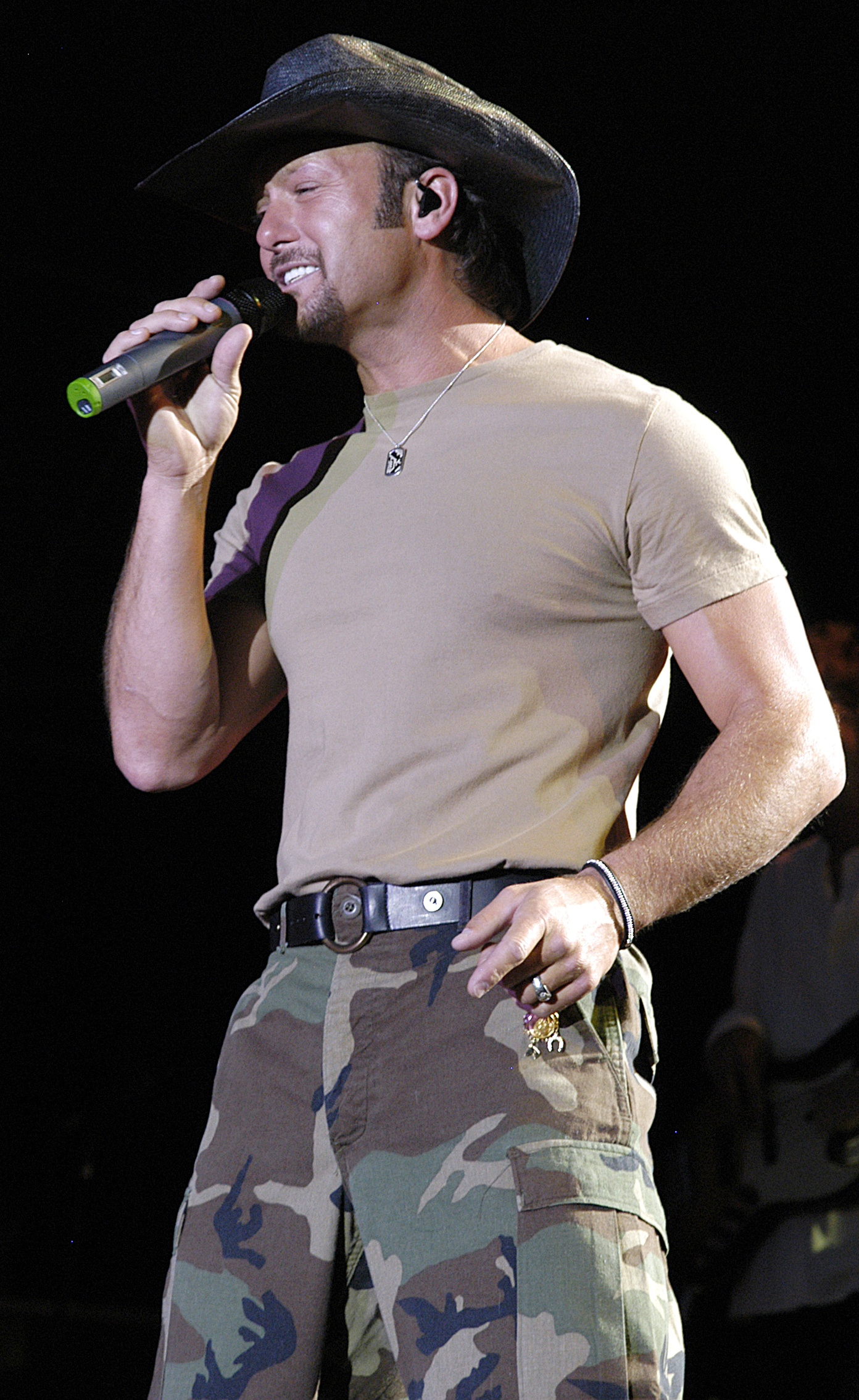
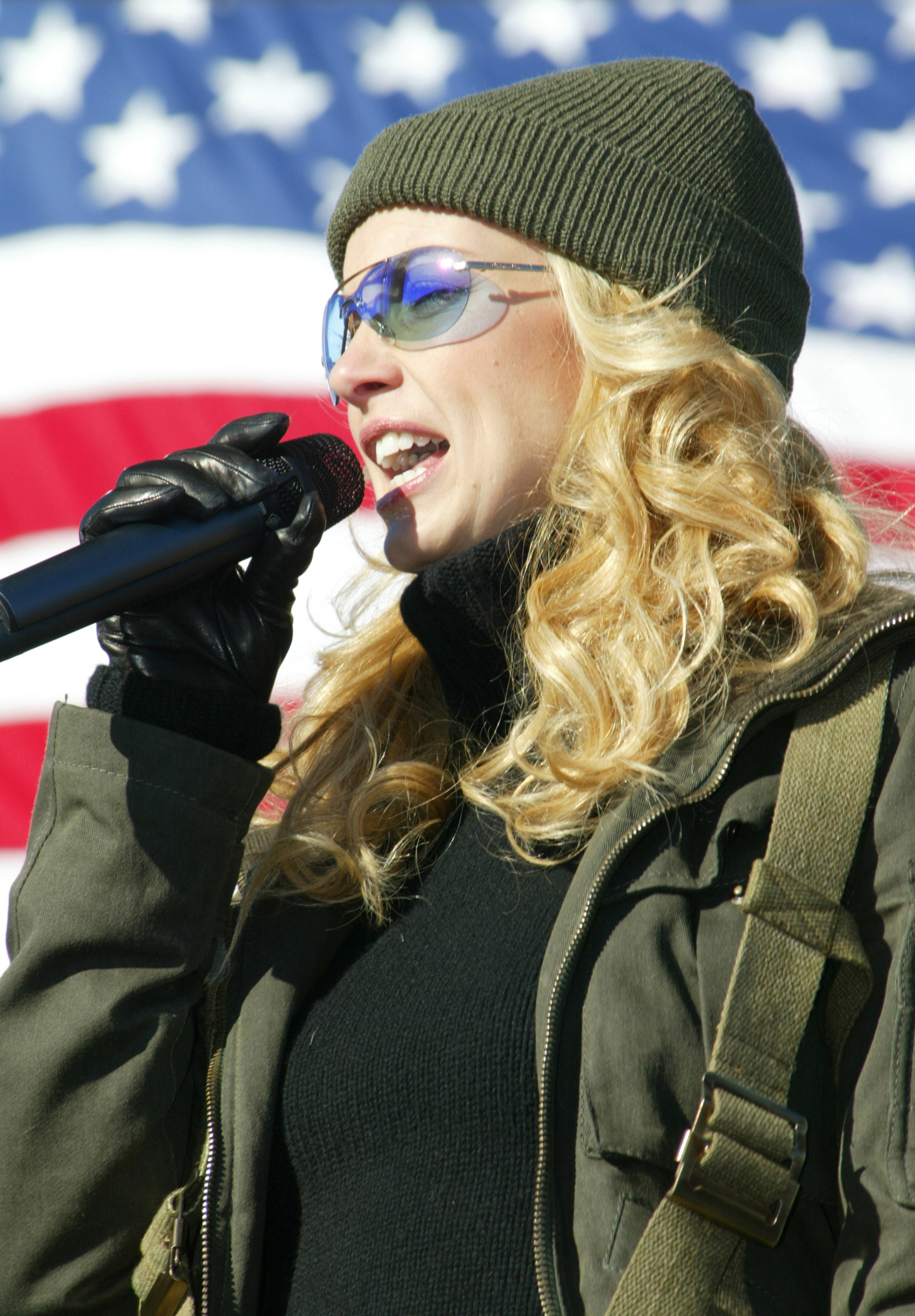
Husband and wife Tim McGraw and Faith Hill each achieved two country number ones in 2000.

Hot Country Songs is a chart that ranks the top-performing country music songs in the United States, published by Billboard magazine. In 2000, 19 different songs topped the chart, then published under the title Hot Country Singles & Tracks, in 52 issues of the magazine, based on weekly airplay data from country music radio stations compiled by Nielsen Broadcast Data Systems.

Singer Faith Hill's song "Breathe" was at number one at the start of the year, having risen to the top in the issue dated December 25, 1999. The song remained at number one for six consecutive weeks until it was knocked off by "Cowboy Take Me Away", performed by the girl group the Dixie Chicks, in the issue dated February 5. "Breathe" was also named the most successful single of the year on the magazine's main singles chart, the Hot 100. Hill returned to the top of the country charts with her next single, "The Way You Love Me", which spent four weeks at number one in May and June. Only two other acts, Lonestar and Hill's husband Tim McGraw, had more than one Hot Country Songs number one during the year. Other singles with extended runs at number one include "How Do You Like Me Now?!" by Toby Keith, "I Hope You Dance" by Lee Ann Womack featuring Sons of the Desert and "That's the Way" by Jo Dee Messina, each of which topped the chart for five weeks. "How Do You Like Me Now?!" was ranked number one on Billboard's year-end chart of the most popular country songs.

In 2000, Chad Brock and Phil Vassar achieved their first Hot Country Songs number ones with "Yes!" and "Just Another Day in Paradise" respectively. Veteran singer Kenny Rogers gained his first number one in thirteen years when "Buy Me a Rose", featuring Billy Dean and Alison Krauss, topped the chart in May. At age 61 Rogers became the oldest artist to achieve a number one country hit. The final number one hit of the year was McGraw's "My Next Thirty Years".

== Chart history ==
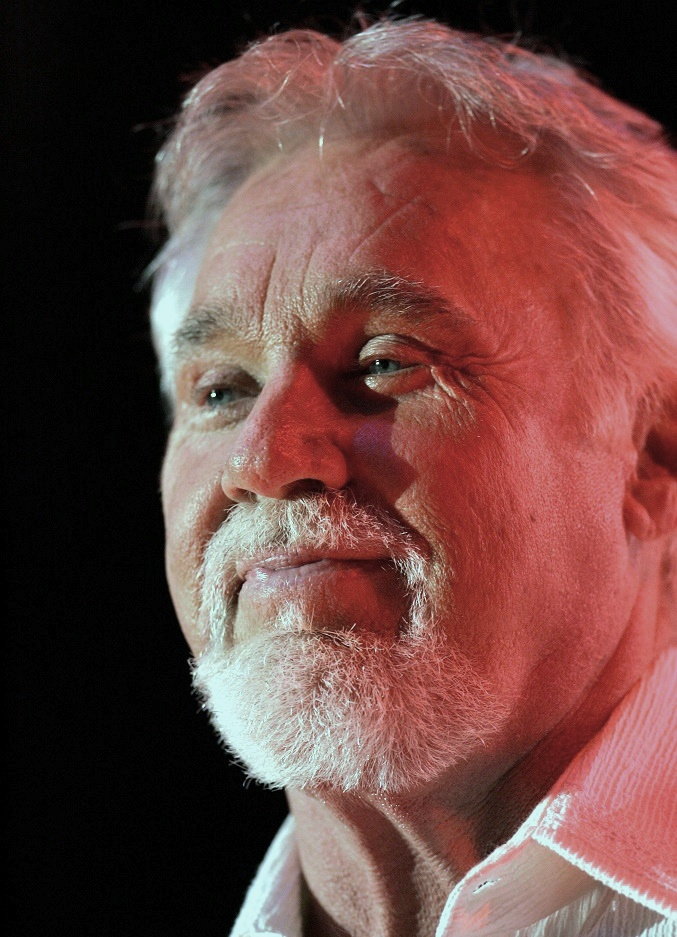
Kenny Rogers scored his first country number one in over a decade and became the oldest artist to top the chart.

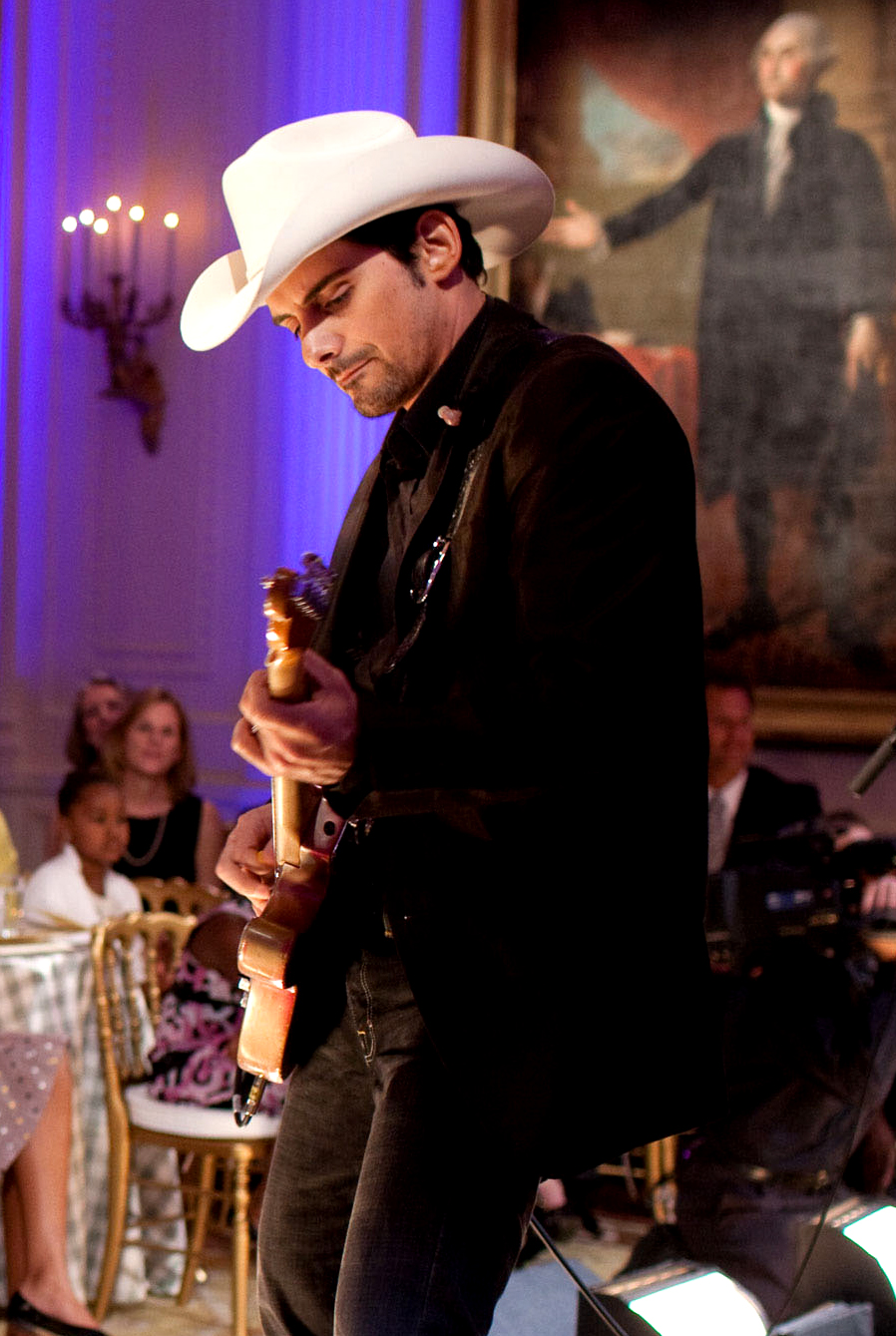
Brad Paisley spent two weeks at number one in December.

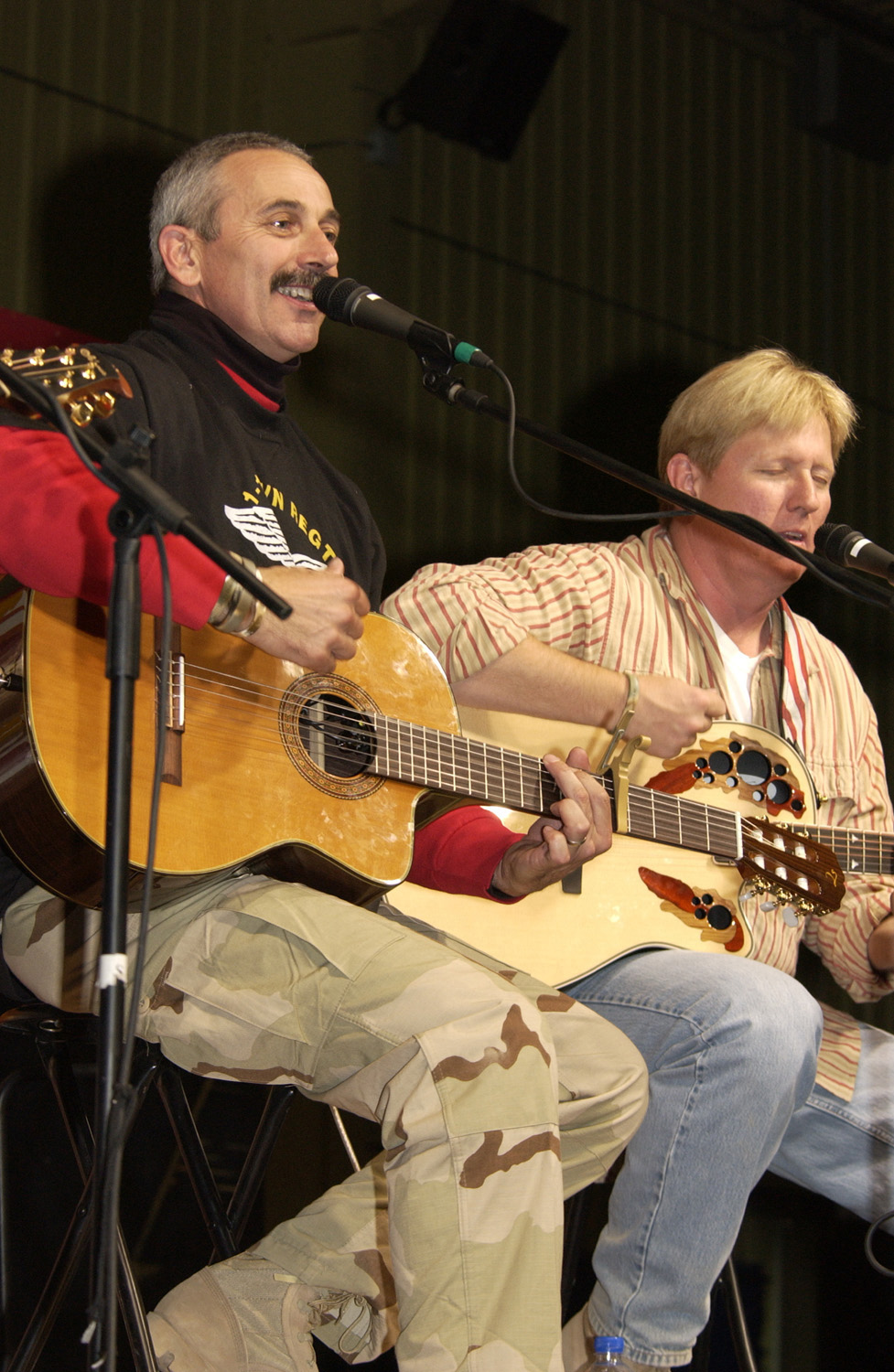
Aaron Tippin (left) had a two-week run at number one in the fall.

Issue date	Title	Artist(s)	Ref.
January 1	"Breathe"	Faith Hill	
January 8	"Breathe"	Faith Hill	
January 15	"Breathe"	Faith Hill	
January 22	"Breathe"	Faith Hill	
January 29	"Breathe"	Faith Hill	
February 5	"Cowboy Take Me Away"	Dixie Chicks	
February 12	"Cowboy Take Me Away"	Dixie Chicks	
February 19	"Cowboy Take Me Away"	Dixie Chicks	
February 26	"My Best Friend"	Tim McGraw	
March 4	"My Best Friend"	Tim McGraw	
March 11	"Smile"	Lonestar	
March 18	"How Do You Like Me Now?!"	Toby Keith	
March 25	"How Do You Like Me Now?!"	Toby Keith	
April 1	"How Do You Like Me Now?!"	Toby Keith	
April 8	"How Do You Like Me Now?!"	Toby Keith	
April 15	"How Do You Like Me Now?!"	Toby Keith	
April 22	"The Best Day"	George Strait	
April 29	"The Best Day"	George Strait	
May 6	"The Best Day"	George Strait	
May 13	"Buy Me a Rose"	Kenny Rogers with Alison Krauss & Billy Dean	
May 20	"The Way You Love Me"	Faith Hill	
May 27	"The Way You Love Me"	Faith Hill	
June 3	"The Way You Love Me"	Faith Hill	
June 10	"The Way You Love Me"	Faith Hill	
June 17	"Yes!"	Chad Brock	
June 24	"Yes!"	Chad Brock	
July 1	"Yes!"	Chad Brock	
July 8	"I Hope You Dance"	Lee Ann Womack with Sons of the Desert	
July 15	"I Hope You Dance"	Lee Ann Womack with Sons of the Desert	
July 22	"I Hope You Dance"	Lee Ann Womack with Sons of the Desert	
July 29	"I Hope You Dance"	Lee Ann Womack with Sons of the Desert	
August 5	"I Hope You Dance"	Lee Ann Womack with Sons of the Desert	
August 12	"What About Now"	Lonestar	
August 19	"What About Now"	Lonestar	
August 26	"What About Now"	Lonestar	
September 2	"What About Now"	Lonestar	
September 9	"It Must Be Love"	Alan Jackson	
September 16	"That's the Way"	Jo Dee Messina	
September 23	"That's the Way"	Jo Dee Messina	
September 30	"That's the Way"	Jo Dee Messina	
October 7	"That's the Way"	Jo Dee Messina	
October 14	"Kiss This"	Aaron Tippin	
October 21	"Kiss This"	Aaron Tippin	
October 28	"The Little Girl"	John Michael Montgomery	
November 4	"The Little Girl"	John Michael Montgomery	
November 11	"The Little Girl"	John Michael Montgomery	
November 18	"Best of Intentions"	Travis Tritt	
November 25	"Just Another Day in Paradise"	Phil Vassar	
December 2	"We Danced"	Brad Paisley	
December 9	"We Danced"	Brad Paisley	
December 16	"My Next Thirty Years"	Tim McGraw	
December 23	"My Next Thirty Years"	Tim McGraw	
December 30	"My Next Thirty Years"	Tim McGraw	

== See also ==
- 2000 in music
- List of artists who reached number one on the U.S. country chart
