= Breathe (Faith Hill album) =

Studio album by Faith Hill
- Released: November 9, 1999
- Studios: Emerald Sound (Nashville, Tennessee); Essential Sound (Nashville, Tennessee); Loud Recording (Nashville, Tennessee); Ocean Way (Nashville, Tennessee); Sony Music Studios (Los Angeles, California); Sound Kitchen (Franklin, Tennessee)
- Genre: Country pop
- Length: 52:27
- Label: Warner Bros. Nashville
- Producers: Byron Gallimore; Faith Hill; Dann Huff

Faith Hill chronology
| Faith (1998) | Breathe (1999) | There You'll Be (2001) |

Singles from Breathe
- 1. "Breathe" Released: September 27, 1999; 2. "The Way You Love Me" Released: February 29, 2000; 3. "Let's Make Love" Released: June 19, 2000; 4. "If My Heart Had Wings" Released: January 8, 2001

Professional ratings
Review scores
| Source | Rating |
|---|---|
| AllMusic | 4.5/5 stars |
| Entertainment Weekly | B− |
| Q | 3/5 stars |
| The Rolling Stone Album Guide | 2/5 stars |
| The Village Voice | C+ |

Breathe is the fourth studio album by American country music artist Faith Hill, released November 9, 1999, via Warner Bros. Nashville. The album is one of the most successful country pop albums of all time and Hill's best selling album to date, being certified 8× Platinum by the Recording Industry Association of America (RIAA).

The album became her most successful record to date, debuting atop both the Billboard 200 and the Top Country Albums chart and becoming the second most successful album of 2000 on the latter chart. Breathe additionally became a top 40 album in ten countries internationally. The album also contains her most successful singles on both the pop and country charts, the title track, and "The Way You Love Me", with the two spending ten weeks combined at number one on the Hot Country Songs chart and peaking at numbers two and six on the all-genre Billboard Hot 100, with "Breathe" becoming the number one song of 2000 on the Hot 100. The album also spawned the country top ten hits "Let's Make Love" (a duet with her husband Tim McGraw) and "If My Heart Had Wings", with the former peaking at number six and the latter at number three. Several album tracks also charted solely on unsolicited airplay. The album includes a cover version of Bette Midler's 1998 song "That's How Love Moves".

== Singles ==
"Breathe", the title track, was released as the lead single from the album on October 4, 1999. The song received highly positive reviews upon its release, with praise being directed towards Hill's vocals. The song itself became a massive success in the United States, spending six weeks atop the Hot Country Songs chart (her longest run to date with a solo song) and spending five weeks at number two on the Billboard Hot 100; despite never going number one on that chart, "Breathe" became one of only four songs in Hot 100 history to be the number one song on the Billboard Year-End chart without ever topping the weekly Hot 100, becoming the number one song of 2000. The song also held a 17-week run on the Hot Adult Contemporary chart. Internationally, the song reached the top forty in Finland, Australia, New Zealand, and the UK. The song was later re-issued and remixed in October 2001 as the second and final single from her international-only compilation album There You'll Be (2001).

"The Way You Love Me" was released on February 14, 2000, as the second single from the record. The song also received positive reviews. Initially released solely to country radio where it spent a four-week reign atop the Hot Country Songs, the song was later issued to pop radio on August 25. The song itself also became a commercial success, peaking at number six on the Billboard Hot 100 and going on to spend 56 weeks on the chart, Hill's longest running single to date and her second consecutive to spend more than a year on the chart following the title track. Internationally, the song gave Hill her most successful single at the time, reaching the top ten in Hungary and Spain, the top twenty in the UK, and the top forty in Italy, New Zealand, Australia, Sweden, and Ireland, which lead the single to reach number 43 on the Eurochart Hot 100 chart, her then-highest peak.

"Let's Make Love", a duet with her husband Tim McGraw, was released on May 12, 2000, to country radio as the third single. Before its release, the song charted for 20 weeks as an album track solely off unsolicited airplay, reaching as high as number 52. After its release, the song became a success, peaking at number six on the Hot Country Songs chart and number five on the RPM Canadian Country Tracks chart, with the song spending 45 weeks on the latter chart.

The album's fourth and final single, "If My Heart Had Wings", was released on January 8, 2001. Debuting on the country charts the week of January 13, 2001, the song rose to as high as number three, giving Hill another commercial success. The song also went on to peak at number 39 on the Hot 100.

=== Other songs ===
Despite not being singles, some songs from Breathe charted solely off unsolicited airplay. "It Will Be Me" and "If I'm Not In Love" both charted on November 27, 1999, on the Hot Country Songs (previously known as Hot Country Singles & Tracks) for one week, peaking at numbers 68 and 74. The song "I Got My Baby" also debuted on the same week, at number 69. The song would re-enter the country charts a year later on November 25, 2000, at number 71, before rising to its peak position of number 63; the song spent four weeks in total.

The most successful non-single was "There Will Come a Day", which was included as a B-side to "Let's Make Love" and "There You'll Be" from the Pearl Harbor soundtrack. Initially debuting on October 28, 2000, at number 75, the song later rose to as high as number 36 on the country charts over a year later on October 20, 2001, and spent 18 weeks in total.

== Commercial performance ==
Breathe debuted at number one on the US Billboard 200, debuting with 242,000 units sold first week. The album became Hill's first number one on the all-genre charts and outsold albums from the likes of Mariah Carey and Savage Garden. Breathe went on to become one of the top twenty most successful albums of 2000. To date, the album has spent 103 weeks on the chart, Hill's only album on the Billboard 200 to spend more than 100 weeks. Breathe also went on to debuted atop the Top Country Albums chart, becoming Hill's first number one album on that chart and went on to spend six weeks atop it, becoming the second most successful country album of 2000 on the chart. The album has gone on to spend 104 weeks on the chart, tying with Faith (1998) to being her second longest running album on the chart. Internationally, Breathe performed moderately well, peaking within the top ten in New Zealand, Norway, and Australia.

== Track listing ==
| No. | Title | Writer(s) | Length |
|---|---|---|---|
| 1. | "What's in It for Me" | Bekka Bramlett; Billy Burnette; Annie Roboff | 5:35 |
| 2. | "I Got My Baby" | Bob DiPiero; Roboff | 3:31 |
| 3. | "Love Is a Sweet Thing" | Brett James; Troy Verges | 3:56 |
| 4. | "Breathe" | Stephanie Bentley; Holly Lamar | 4:09 |
| 5. | "Let's Make Love" (duet with Tim McGraw) | Marv Green; Chris Lindsey; Bill Luther; Aimee Mayo | 4:11 |
| 6. | "It Will Be Me" | Gordon Kennedy; Wayne Kirkpatrick | 3:46 |
| 7. | "The Way You Love Me" | Michael Dulaney; Keith Follesé | 3:06 |
| 8. | "If I'm Not in Love" | Constant Change | 4:02 |
| 9. | "Bringing Out the Elvis" | Louise Hoffsten; Leif Larsson | 3:34 |
| 10. | "If My Heart Had Wings" | J. Fred Knobloch; Roboff | 3:35 |
| 11. | "If I Should Fall Behind" | Bruce Springsteen | 4:32 |
| 12. | "That's How Love Moves" | Jennifer Kimball; Ty Lacy; Fitzgerald Scott | 4:14 |
| 13. | "There Will Come a Day" | Lindsey; Luther; Mayo | 4:15 |
| Total length: | | | 52:27 |

International version bonus tracks
| No. | Title | Writer(s) | Length |
|---|---|---|---|
| 14. | "This Kiss" (Radio version) | Beth Nielsen Chapman; Lerner; Roboff | 3:16 |
| 15. | "Breathe" (Hex Hector Radio Edit #1) | Bentley; Lamar | 3:57 |
| 16. | "The Way You Love Me" (Love to Infinity Edit) | Dulaney; Follesé | 2:59 |
| Total length: | | | 62:39 |

Australian version bonus tracks
| No. | Title | Writer(s) | Length |
|---|---|---|---|
| 14. | "This Kiss" (Radio version) | Chapman; Lerner; Roboff | 3:16 |
| 15. | "Let Me Let Go" | Steve Diamond; Dennis Morgan | 4:25 |
| 16. | "Just to Hear You Say That You Love Me" (with Tim McGraw) | Diane Warren | 4:28 |
| 17. | "Breathe" (Hex Hector Radio Edit #1) | Bentley; Lamar | 3:57 |
| Total length: | | | 68:33 |

== Personnel ==
From Breathe liner notes.

=== Musicians ===
"What's In It for Me"

- Tim Akers – keyboards
- Mike Brignardello – bass guitar
- Lisa Cochran – background vocals
- Eric Darken – percussion
- Paul Franklin – steel guitar
- Aubrey Haynie – fiddle
- Dann Huff – electric guitar
- Gordon Kennedy – electric guitar
- B. James Lowry – acoustic guitar
- Chris Rodriguez – background vocals
- Lonnie Wilson – drums

"I Got My Baby"

- Bekka Bramlett – background vocals
- Larry Byrom – acoustic guitar
- Paul Franklin – steel guitar
- Aubrey Haynie – fiddle
- Michael Landau – electric guitar
- B. James Lowry – electric guitar
- Brent Mason – electric guitar
- Steve Nathan – keyboards
- Chris Rodriguez – background vocals
- Dennis Wilson – background vocals
- Lonnie Wilson – drums
- Glenn Worf – bass guitar

"Love Is a Sweet Thing"

- Tim Akers – keyboards
- Mike Brignardello – bass guitar
- Lisa Cochran – background vocals
- Eric Darken – percussion
- Paul Franklin – steel guitar
- Dann Huff – electric guitar
- Gordon Kennedy – electric guitar
- B. James Lowry – acoustic guitar
- Gene Miller – background vocals
- Lonnie Wilson – drums

"Breathe"

- Bekka Bramlett – background vocals
- Larry Byrom – acoustic guitar
- Stuart Duncan – fiddle
- Paul Franklin – steel guitar
- Michael Landau – electric guitar
- B. James Lowry – electric guitar
- Brent Mason – electric guitar
- Steve Nathan – keyboards
- Chris Rodriguez – background vocals
- Lonnie Wilson – drums
- Glenn Worf – bass guitar

"Let's Make Love"

- Larry Byrom – acoustic guitar
- Paul Franklin – steel guitar
- Aubrey Haynie – fiddle
- Michael Landau – electric guitar
- B. James Lowry – electric guitar
- Brent Mason – electric guitar
- Tim McGraw – guest vocals
- Steve Nathan – keyboards
- Kim Parent – background vocals
- Chris Rodriguez – background vocals
- Gary Smith – piano, organ
- Lonnie Wilson – drums
- Glenn Worf – bass guitar

"It Will Be Me"

- Bekka Bramlett – background vocals
- Larry Byrom – acoustic guitar
- Stuart Duncan – fiddle
- Paul Franklin – steel guitar
- Michael Landau – electric guitar
- B. James Lowry – electric guitar
- Brent Mason – electric guitar
- Steve Nathan – keyboards
- Chris Rodriguez – background vocals
- Lonnie Wilson – drums
- Glenn Worf – bass guitar

"The Way You Love Me"

- Stephanie Bentley – background vocals
- Bekka Bramlett – background vocals
- Larry Byrom – acoustic guitar
- Paul Franklin – steel guitar
- Aubrey Haynie – fiddle
- Michael Landau – electric guitar
- B. James Lowry – electric guitar
- Brent Mason – electric guitar
- Steve Nathan – keyboards
- Chris Rodriguez – background vocals
- Lonnie Wilson – drums
- Glenn Worf – bass guitar

"If I'm Not in Love"

- Larry Byrom – acoustic guitar
- Stuart Duncan – fiddle
- Paul Franklin – steel guitar
- Michael Landau – electric guitar
- B. James Lowry – electric guitar
- Brent Mason – electric guitar
- Nashville String Machine – strings
- Steve Nathan – keyboards
- Lonnie Wilson – drums
- Glenn Worf – bass guitar

"Bringing Out the Elvis"

- Tim Akers – keyboards
- Lisa Bevill – background vocals
- Mike Brignardello – bass guitar
- Lisa Cochran – background vocals
- Eric Darken – percussion
- Dann Huff – electric guitar
- Terry McMillan – harmonica
- Jerry McPherson – electric guitar
- Chris Rodriguez – background vocals
- Biff Watson – acoustic guitar
- Lonnie Wilson – drums

"If My Heart Had Wings"

- Bekka Bramlett – background vocals
- Larry Byrom – acoustic guitar
- Paul Franklin – steel guitar
- Aubrey Haynie – fiddle
- Michael Landau – electric guitar
- Brent Mason – electric guitar
- Steve Nathan – keyboards
- Kim Parent – background vocals
- Chris Rodriguez – background vocals
- John Willis – electric guitar
- Lonnie Wilson – drums
- Glenn Worf – bass guitar

"If I Should Fall Behind"

- Bekka Bramlett – background vocals
- Larry Byrom – acoustic guitar
- Paul Franklin – steel guitar
- Aubrey Haynie – fiddle
- B. James Lowry – electric guitar
- Brent Mason – electric guitar
- Steve Nathan – keyboards
- Chris Rodriguez – background vocals
- Lonnie Wilson – drums
- Glenn Worf – bass guitar

"That's How Love Moves"

- Tim Akers – keyboards
- Steve Brewster – drums
- Mike Brignardello – bass guitar
- Lisa Cochran – background vocals
- Eric Darken – percussion
- Paul Franklin – steel guitar
- Dann Huff – electric guitar
- Gordon Kennedy – electric guitar
- B. James Lowry – acoustic guitar
- Gene Miller – background vocals
- Nashville String Machine – strings

"There Will Come a Day"

- Bekka Bramlett – background vocals
- Mike Brignardello – bass guitar
- Larry Byrom – acoustic guitar
- Paul Franklin – steel guitar
- Aubrey Haynie – fiddle
- Michael Landau – electric guitar
- B. James Lowry – electric guitar
- Brent Mason – electric guitar
- Steve Nathan – organ, synthesizer
- Chris Rodriguez – background vocals
- Gary Smith – piano
- Lonnie Wilson – drums
- Glenn Worf – bass guitar

=== Technical ===
- Jeff Balding – recording (tracks 1, 3, 9, 12)
- Derek Bason – recording (tracks 1, 3, 9, 12)
- Byron Gallimore – production (all tracks except 1, 3, 9, 12)
- Carl Gorodetzky – string contractor (tracks 8, 12)
- Mark Hagen – recording (tracks 1, 3, 9, 12)
- Faith Hill – production (all tracks)
- Dann Huff – production (tracks 1, 3, 9, 12)
- Ronn Huff – string arrangements, conducting (tracks 8, 12)
- Julian King – recording (all tracks except 1, 3, 9, 12)
- Chris Lord-Alge – mixing (tracks 5, 11 only)
- Doug Sax – mastering
- Mike Shipley – mixing (all tracks except 5 and 11)
- Shawn Simpson – digital editing

== Charts ==
=== Weekly charts ===
| Chart (1999–2001) | Peak position |
|---|---|
| Australian Albums (ARIA) | 7 |
| Belgian Albums (Ultratop Flanders) | 43 |
| Canada Top Albums/CDs (RPM) | 26 |
| European Top 100 Albums (Music & Media) | 39 |
| Finnish Albums (Suomen virallinen lista) | 15 |
| French Albums (SNEP) | 63 |
| German Albums (Offizielle Top 100) | 76 |
| Irish Albums (IRMA) | 43 |
| Italian Albums (FIMI) | 36 |
| New Zealand Albums (RMNZ) | 3 |
| Norwegian Albums (VG-lista) | 3 |
| Scottish Albums (Official Charts) | 11 |
| Swedish Albums (Sverigetopplistan) | 12 |
| Swiss Albums (Schweizer Hitparade) | 38 |
| UK Albums (Official Charts) | 19 |
| US Billboard 200 | 1 |
| US Top Country Albums (Billboard) | 1 |

=== Year-end charts ===
Year-end chart performance for Breathe by Faith Hill
| Chart (1999) | Position |
|---|---|
| US Top Country Albums (Billboard) | 39 |

| Chart (2000) | Position |
|---|---|
| Canadian Albums (Nielsen SoundScan) | 21 |
| US Billboard 200 | 16 |
| US Top Country Albums (Billboard) | 2 |

| Chart (2001) | Position |
|---|---|
| Australian Albums (ARIA) | 33 |
| Canadian Albums (Nielsen SoundScan) | 69 |
| Canadian Country Albums (Nielsen SoundScan) | 4 |
| UK Albums (OCC) | 181 |
| US Billboard 200 | 34 |
| US Top Country Albums (Billboard) | 4 |

| Chart (2002) | Position |
|---|---|
| Canadian Country Albums (Nielsen SoundScan) | 32 |

== Certifications ==
| Region | Certification | Certified units/sales |
|---|---|---|
| Australia (ARIA) | 2× Platinum | 140,000^{^} |
| Canada (Music Canada) | 5× Platinum | 500,000^{^} |
| New Zealand (RMNZ) | 2× Platinum | 30,000^{^} |
| Spain (Promusicae) | Gold | 50,000^{^} |
| Sweden (GLF) | Gold | 40,000^{^} |
| United Kingdom (BPI) | Gold | 100,000^{^} |
| United States (RIAA) | 8× Platinum | 8,000,000^{^} |
^{^} Shipments figures based on certification alone.

== Awards and nominations ==
| Year | Association | Category | Result |
|---|---|---|---|
| 2000 | Academy of Country Music Awards | Album of the Year | Nominated |
| 2000 | Country Music Association Awards | Album of the Year | Nominated |
| 2001 | Grammy Awards | Best Country Album | Won |
| 2001 | American Music Awards | Favorite Country Album | Won |
