= It Will Be Me =

It Will Be Me may refer to:

- "It Will Be Me", a song by Faith Hill from Breathe
- "It Will Be Me", a song by Melissa Etheridge from the Brother Bear 2 soundtrack
