= 1998 Country Music Association Awards =

Annual US music awards ceremony

- Date: September 23, 1998
- Location: Grand Ole Opry House, Nashville, Tennessee
- Hosted by: Vince Gill
- Most wins: Steve Wariner (3)
- Most nominations: Tim McGraw; George Strait (5 each)

Television/radio coverage
- Network: CBS

The 1998 Country Music Association Awards, 32nd Ceremony, was held on September 23, 1998 at the Grand Ole Opry House, Nashville, Tennessee, and was hosted by CMA Award Winner, Vince Gill. Tim McGraw and George Strait went in to the night with 5 nominations each, including Entertainer of the Year. Steve Wariner led the night with 3 wins, including Song of the year.

== Winners and nominees ==
Winner are in Bold.

Entertainer of the Year	Album of the Year
**Garth Brooks**; Brooks & Dunn; Vince Gill; Tim McGraw; George Strait	**Everywhere** **— Tim McGraw**; Come On Over — Shania Twain; Long Stretch of Lonesome — Patty Loveless; One Step at a Time — George Strait; Sevens — Garth Brooks
Male Vocalist of the Year	Female Vocalist of the Year
**George Strait**; Garth Brooks; Vince Gill; Tim McGraw; Collin Raye	**Trisha Yearwood**; Faith Hill; Patty Loveless; Martina McBride; Lee Ann Womack
Vocal Group of the Year	Vocal Duo of the Year
**Dixie Chicks**; Alabama; Diamond Rio; The Mavericks; Sawyer Brown	**Brooks & Dunn**; Bellamy Brothers; The Kinleys; The Lynns; Thrasher & Shiver
Single of the Year	Song of the Year
**"Holes In The Floor of Heaven" — Steve Wariner**; "A Broken Wing" — Martina McBride; "I Just Want To Dance With You" — George Strait; "This Kiss" — Faith Hill; "You Don't Seem To Miss Me" — Patty Loveless	**Holes In The Floor of Heaven — Steve Wariner and Billy Kirsch**; A Broken Wing — James House, Phil Barnhart, and Sam Hogin; How Do I Live — Diane Warren; I Just Want To Dance With You — John Prine and Roger Cook; It's Your Love — Stephony Smith
Horizon Award	Musician of the Year
**Dixie Chicks**; Trace Adkins; Jo Dee Messina; Michael Peterson; Lee Ann Womack	**Brent Mason**; Eddie Bayers; Paul Franklin; Matt Rollings; Brent Rowan
Music Video of the Year	Music Event of the Year
**"This Kiss" — Faith Hill**; "A Broken Wing" — Martina McBride; "Bye Bye" — Jo Dee Messina; "Carrying Your Love With Me" — George Strait; Did I Shave My Legs For This?" — Deana Carter	**"You Don't Seem To Miss Me" — Patty Loveless and George Jones**; "If You See Him/If You See Her" — Brooks & Dunn and Reba McEntire; "In Another's Eyes" — Garth Brooks and Trisha Yearwood; "Just To Hear You Say That You Love Me" — Tim McGraw and Faith Hill; "What If I Said" — Anita Cochran and Steve Wariner

== Hall Of Fame ==
Country Music Hall Of Fame Inductees
- George Morgan
- Elvis Presley
- E.W. "Bud" Wendell
- Tammy Wynette
