= Mission: Impossible 2 (score) =

Mission: Impossible 2 – Music from the Original Motion Picture Score

Film score by Hans Zimmer
- Released: June 13, 2000
- Genres: Heavy metal, pop rock, classical, electronica
- Length: 45:50
- Label: Hollywood
- Producer: Hans Zimmer

Hans Zimmer chronology
Gladiator (2000)	Mission: Impossible 2 – Music from the Original Motion Picture Score (2000)	Pearl Harbor (2001)

Professional ratings
Review scores
Source	Rating
Allmusic	3/5 stars
Filmtracks.com	2/5 stars
Soundtrack.net	2.5/5 stars

Mission: Impossible 2 – Music from the Original Motion Picture Score is an original score album by Hans Zimmer for the 2000 film Mission: Impossible 2. Lisa Gerrard provided contralto vocal cues (including wailing) for certain tracks in her second collaboration with Hans Zimmer in the same year along with Gladiator.

== Track listing ==
All music is composed by Hans Zimmer except where noted.

Mission: Impossible 2 (Music from the Original Motion Picture Score)
No.	Title	Artist	Length
1.	"Hijack"		4:09
2.	"Iko Iko"	Zap Mama	3:23
3.	"Seville (feat. Lisa Gerrard)"		4:32
4.	"Nyah (feat. Heitor Pereira)"		2:20
5.	"Mission: Impossible Theme"		0:39
6.	"The Heist"		2:22
7.	"Ambrose"		2:37
8.	"Bio-Techno"		1:42
9.	"Injection (feat. Lisa Gerrard)"		4:49
10.	"Bare Island^{[a]}"		5:30
11.	"Chimera"		1:42
12.	"The Bait^{[a]}"		1:00
13.	"Mano a Mano (feat. Lisa Gerrard)"		4:22
14.	"Mission Accomplished"		1:44
15.	"Nyah and Ethan"		5:05
Total length:			45:50

== Personnel ==
- Klaus Badelt
- Michael Brook
- Lisa Gerrard
- Dave Gamson
- Nick Glennie-Smith
- Oliver Leiber
- Heitor Pereira
- Jeff Rona
- Martin Tillman
- Mel Wesson
- Hans Zimmer

== Notes ==
- ^{^a} Contains excerpts from "Mission: Impossible Theme" written by Lalo Schifrin
