= Where Are You Christmas? =

2000 single by Faith Hill

Single by Faith Hill

from the album Dr. Seuss’ How the Grinch Stole Christmas: Original Motion Picture Soundtrack
- Released: December 11, 2000
- Recorded: 2000
- Genre: Christmas; country; pop
- Length: 4:07
- Label: Warner Bros. Nashville; Interscope
- Songwriters: Mariah Carey; James Horner; Will Jennings
- Producers: Byron Gallimore; Faith Hill

Faith Hill singles chronology
| "Let's Make Love" (2000) | "Where Are You Christmas?" (2000) | "If My Heart Had Wings" (2001) |

"Where Are You Christmas?" is a song written by Mariah Carey, James Horner, and Will Jennings for the 2000 film How the Grinch Stole Christmas. In the film, it is first sung by Taylor Momsen, who played Cindy Lou Who under the title, "Christmas, Why Can't I Find You?".

Mariah Carey wrote a full-length pop version of the song with additional lyrics for the film's soundtrack. The song was originally recorded by Carey, but because of a legal case with her ex-husband Tommy Mottola, it could not be released, so it was re-recorded and released by Faith Hill. A CD single of Hill's rendition was released December 11, 2000. A video was released featuring Hill singing from the Grinch's mountaintop home, interspersed with clips from the film and a cameo appearance by Momsen as Cindy Lou Who.

== Composition ==
"Where Are You Christmas?" is a power ballad written by James Horner and Will Jennings, with additional lyrics provided by Mariah Carey. The song is composed in the key of B♭ major and set to a slow tempo of 56 BPM. Hill's vocals range almost two octaves, from F_{3} to E♭_{5}.

In a 2021 interview with Harper's Bazaar, Carey stated that she thought "up the song's bridge, which transforms melancholy into triumph, in the car en route to work with" Horner.

== Critical reception ==
Billy Dukes of Taste of Country ranked "Where Are You Christmas?" at number 6 on a list of the top 50 country Christmas songs, writing that the song was "touching" and that "Hill performs it like a woman at the top of her game, which she certainly was". Describing the song as underrated, Pip Ellwood-Hughes of Entertainment Focus praised Hill's vocal performance, writing that "[she] sounds incredible as she unleashes the full range of her powerful voice".

Conversely, Cameron Martin of The Atlantic labeled the song as one of the top ten "most annoying" holiday songs. Steve Simels of TV Guide was critical of "Where Are You Christmas?" in his review of the Grinch film, writing that "none but the thoroughly perverse of hearing should stick around for the closing credits and Faith Hill warbling" the song.

== Label dispute ==
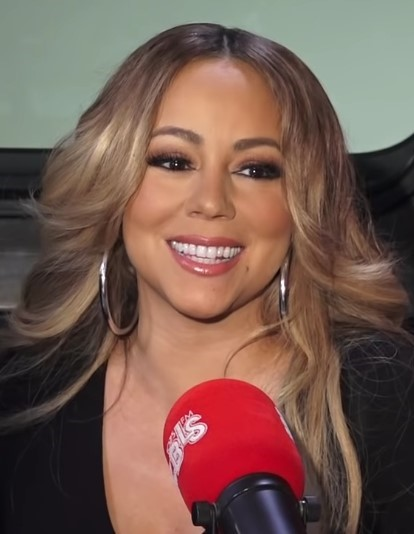
Mariah Carey (pictured) co-wrote the song but was denied release of her version due to an ongoing legal battle with her ex-husband. Carey has since expressed her wishes in releasing her version.

The release of the song was involved with some controversy between American singer Mariah Carey, who co-wrote the song with James Horner and Will Jennings, against her former husband Tommy Mottola, the chairman and CEO of Sony Music at the time. During their divorce, Mottola blocked Carey's release of the song due to an ongoing legal battle.

In 2020, during the promotion for her memoir, Carey revealed on a Watch What Happens Live with Andy Cohen episode that "she did record it, and she does have the demo somewhere" but that she would have to "dig back into the vault to find [her] version". In 2021, she said that she is "enthusiastic but hesitant" to release her version of the song.

== Cover versions ==
"Where Are You Christmas?" has been covered by a variety of artists since its release, including the American vocal group Pentatonix who recorded an a cappella version of the song in 2018.

On October 10, 2025, Taylor Momsen released a rock version of "Where Are You Christmas?" with her band the Pretty Reckless that also includes elements from "Christmas, Why Can't I Find You?". The recording was later included on the band's Christmas EP, Taylor Momsen's Pretty Reckless Christmas, along with a newly recorded version of "Christmas, Why Can't I Find You?" by Momsen. In 2025, the song reached No. 1 on Billboard's Hot Hard Rock Songs chart.

== Commercial performance ==
"Where Are You Christmas?" peaked at number 10 on the Billboard Adult Contemporary chart in January 2001, becoming Hill's fifth top ten single at that format. The song experienced crossover success at radio, peaking at number 26 on the Hot Country Songs chart and at number 40 on the Adult Pop Songs chart, in addition to reaching a peak position of 65 on the Billboard Hot 100. In 2013, "Where Are You Christmas?" peaked at number 15 on the seasonal Holiday 100 chart, on which it has continued making appearances throughout the 2010s. The song has never entered the Canadian Hot 100, but did reach a peak position of 38 of the Hot Canadian Digital Songs component chart in 2018.

"Where Are You Christmas" was placed seventh on the list of all-time best-selling Christmas/holiday digital singles in SoundScan history in 2016. As of December 2019, total digital sales of the Faith Hill recording has reached 1,002,000 downloads according to Nielsen SoundScan.

== Charts ==
| Chart (2000–18) | Peak position |
|---|---|
| Canada Hot Digital Songs (Billboard) | 38 |
| Netherlands (Dutch Top 40) | 37 |
| Netherlands (Single Top 100) | 35 |
| US Billboard Hot 100 | 65 |
| US Adult Contemporary (Billboard) | 10 |
| US Adult Pop Airplay (Billboard) | 40 |
| US Holiday 100 (Billboard) | 15 |
| US Hot Country Songs (Billboard) | 26 |

=== The Pretty Reckless version ===
| Chart (2025–2026) | Peak position |
|---|---|
| Canada Hot 100 (Billboard) | 75 |
| Ireland (IRMA) | 91 |
| New Zealand Hot Singles (RMNZ) | 5 |
| US Hot Rock & Alternative Songs (Billboard) | 11 |
