= A Place in the Sun (Tim McGraw album) =

Studio album by Tim McGraw
- Released: May 4, 1999
- Recorded: 1999
- Studios: Ocean Way, Nashville
- Genres: Country pop; country rock
- Length: 54:04
- Label: Curb
- Producers: Byron Gallimore; Tim McGraw; James Stroud

Tim McGraw chronology
Everywhere (1997)	A Place in the Sun (1999)	Greatest Hits (2000)

Singles from A Place in the Sun
- 1. "Please Remember Me" Released: March 22, 1999; 2. "Something Like That" Released: June 28, 1999; 3. "My Best Friend" Released: October 4, 1999; 4. "Some Things Never Change" Released: April 10, 2000; 5. "My Next Thirty Years" Released: July 17, 2000

Professional ratings
Review scores
Source	Rating
AllMusic	link
Entertainment Weekly	B− link
Los Angeles Times	link
Q	link
Robert Christgau	link

A Place in the Sun is the fifth studio album by American country music artist Tim McGraw. It was released on May 4, 1999. "Please Remember Me" was nominated for Best Male Country Vocal Performance at the 2000 Grammy Awards. "My Best Friend" was nominated in the same category the following year. The album's compact disc version was originally available with a limited edition booklet that contained two transparent sleeves inside. Subsequent releases have all the same information, though without the transparent pages.

This album produced the singles "Please Remember Me", "Something Like That", "My Best Friend", "My Next Thirty Years" and "Some Things Never Change"; "Please Remember Me" was originally recorded by Rodney Crowell on his 1995 album Jewel of the South, and was a #69 country hit for him that year. Except for the #7-peaking "Some Things Never Change", all the singles on this album reached number one on the Hot Country Songs charts; "Seventeen" and "Señorita Margarita" also reached the lower regions of that chart from unsolicited airplay.

== Track listing ==
No.	Title	Writer(s)	Length
1.	"The Trouble with Never"	Mark Nesler; Tony Martin	4:14
2.	"Seventeen"	Chris Lindsey; Bill Luther; Aimee Mayo	3:18
3.	"She'll Have You Back"	Deryl Dodd; Allen Chancey	3:25
4.	"Somebody Must Be Prayin' for Me"	Frank Vinci; Kris Bergsnes	3:52
5.	"My Best Friend"	Luther; Mayo	4:39
6.	"Señorita Margarita"	Bob DiPiero; George Teren	3:50
7.	"Some Things Never Change"	Walt Aldridge; Brad Crisler	3:56
8.	"You Don't Love Me Anymore"	Greg Barnhill; Kim Carnes	3:42
9.	"Something Like That"	Rick Ferrell; Keith Follesé	3:03
10.	"Please Remember Me"	Rodney Crowell; Will Jennings	4:55
11.	"Carry On"	Mark Collie; Hillary Kanter; Even Stevens	3:22
12.	"My Next Thirty Years"	Phil Vassar	3:37
13.	"Eyes of a Woman"	Rory Bourke; Steve Mandile	3:47
14.	"A Place in the Sun"	Lindsey; Steve Dukes	4:18
Total length:			54:04

== Personnel ==
=== Musicians ===
- Tim McGraw – lead vocals
- Steve Nathan – keyboards
- Larry Byrom – acoustic guitar
- Biff Watson – acoustic guitar
- Mike Durham – electric guitar
- Michael Landau – electric guitar
- B. James Lowry – electric guitar
- Brent Mason – electric guitar
- John Willis – electric guitar
- Dan Dugmore – steel guitar
- Paul Franklin – steel guitar
- Mike Brignardello – bass
- Glenn Worf – bass
- Lonnie Wilson – drums
- Glen Duncan – fiddle
- Aubrey Haynie – fiddle
- Bergen White – string arrangements and conductor (8, 10, 14)
- Carl Gorodetzky – string contractor (8, 10, 14)
- The Nashville String Machine – strings (8, 10, 14)
- Greg Barnhill – backing vocals
- Kim Carnes – backing vocals (8)
- Patty Loveless – backing vocals (10)
- Kim Parent – backing vocals
- Chris Rodriguez – backing vocals
- Curtis Wright – backing vocals
- Curtis Young – backing vocals

=== Production ===
- Byron Gallimore – producer
- Tim McGraw – producer, creative director
- James Stroud – producer
- Rich Hanson – engineer
- Julian King – tracking engineer
- Ricky Cobble – second tracking engineer
- Jed Hackett – second tracking engineer
- Glenn Spinner – second tracking engineer
- Aaron Swihart – second tracking engineer
- Russ Martin – string engineer (8, 10, 14)
- Amy Hughes-Frigo – second string engineer (8, 10, 14)
- Rob MacMillan – second string engineer (8, 10, 14)
- Dennis Davis – overdub engineer, vocal tracking, digital editing
- Erik Lutkins – overdub engineer, vocal tracking, digital editing
- John Van Nest – digital editing
- Chris Lord-Alge – mixing
- Mike Dy – mix assistant
- Rob Hoffman – mix assistant
- Doug Sax – mastering
- Ann Callis – production assistant
- Doug Rich – production assistant
- Missi Gallimore – song assistant
- Michelle Metzger – song assistant
- Kelly Wright – creative director
- Glenn Sweitzer – art direction, design
- Russ Harrington – photography

Studios

- Additional recording at Essential Sound Studios (Houston, Texas); The Tracking Room and Loud Recording (Nashville, Tennessee); Studio 56 (Hollywood, California)
- Mixed at Image Recording Studios (Los Angeles, California)
- Mastered at The Mastering Lab (Hollywood, California)

== Chart performance ==
=== Weekly charts ===
Chart (1999)	Peak position
Australian Albums (ARIA)	84
Canada Top Albums/CDs (RPM)	26
Canada Country Albums/CDs (RPM)	2
US Billboard 200	1
US Top Country Albums (Billboard)	1

=== Year-end charts ===
Chart (1999)	Position
US Billboard 200	48
US Top Country Albums (Billboard)	4
Chart (2000)	Position
US Billboard 200	47
US Top Country Albums (Billboard)	4
Chart (2001)	Position
US Top Country Albums (Billboard)	54

=== Singles ===
Year	Single	Peak chart positions		
Year	Single	US Country	US	CAN Country
1999	"Please Remember Me"	1	10	1
1999	"Something Like That"	1	28	1
1999	"My Best Friend"	1	29	1
2000	"Some Things Never Change"	7	58	1
2000	"My Next Thirty Years"	1	27	6

== Certifications ==
Region	Certification	Certified units/sales
Canada (Music Canada)	Platinum	100,000^{^}
United States (RIAA)	4× Platinum	4,000,000^{‡}
^{^} Shipments figures based on certification alone.^{‡} Sales+streaming figures based on certification alone.
