= Love Ain't Like That =

Single by Faith Hill

from the album Faith
- Released: January 11, 1999
- Studio: Loud Recording (Nashville, TN); Ocean Way Recording (Nashville, TN)
- Genre: Country
- Length: 3:50
- Label: Warner Bros. Nashville
- Songwriters: Tim Gaetano; A. J. Masters
- Producers: Faith Hill; Byron Gallimore

Faith Hill singles chronology
"Let Me Let Go" (1998)	"Love Ain't Like That" (1999)	"The Secret of Life" (1999)

"Love Ain't Like That" is a song written by Tim Gaetano and A. J. Masters, and recorded by American country music artist Faith Hill. It was released in January 1999 as the fourth single from her album Faith. The song reached number 12 on the Billboard Hot Country Singles & Tracks chart in April 1999.

== Critical reception ==
Deborah Evans Price of Billboard gave the song a favorable review, writing that "the lyric is a rich tapestry exploring the complex nature of love, and Hill's vocal oozes soulful emotion."

== Chart performance ==
Chart (1999)	Peak position
Canada Country Singles (RPM)	13
US Billboard Hot 100	68
US Hot Country Songs (Billboard)	12

=== Year-end charts ===
Chart (1999)	Position
Canada Country Tracks (RPM)	85
US Country Songs (Billboard)	61

== Release history ==
Release dates and format(s) for "Love Ain't Like That"
Region	Date	Format(s)	Label(s)	Ref.
United States	January 11, 1999	Country radio	Warner Bros. Nashville	
