= Let's Make Love (song) =

Single by Faith Hill with Tim McGraw

from the album Breathe
- B-side: "There Will Come a Day"
- Released: June 19, 2000
- Studio: Ocean Way Recording (Nashville, TN); Sony Music Studios (Los Angeles, CA); Loud Recording (Nashville, TN); Essential Sound (Nashville, TN)
- Genre: Country
- Length: 4:11
- Label: Warner Bros. Nashville; Curb
- Songwriters: Marv Green; Aimee Mayo; Chris Lindsey; Bill Luther
- Producers: Byron Gallimore; Faith Hill

Faith Hill singles chronology
"The Way You Love Me" (2000)	"Let's Make Love" (2000)	"Where Are You Christmas?" (2000)

Tim McGraw singles chronology
"My Next Thirty Years" (2000)	"Let's Make Love" (2000)	"Grown Men Don't Cry" (2001)

"Let's Make Love" is a song recorded by American country music artist Faith Hill. The song written by Marv Green, Aimee Mayo, Chris Lindsey and Bill Luther, and produced by Hill and Byron Gallimore. Hill recorded the song as a duet with her husband Tim McGraw. It was released on June 19, 2000 as the third single from Hill's fourth studio album Breathe (1999), and was also included on McGraw's first greatest hits album.

The song became a commercial success, peaking at number six and spending 45 weeks on the Hot Country Songs chart, becoming Hill's longest running and McGraw's second longest running single. A music video was later released, which was directed by Lili Fini Zanuck, which featured the couple in and around Paris. The video became a great success and was played regularly on stations like CMT and GAC. The song later won the 2001 Grammy Award for Best Country Collaboration with Vocals. The single's b-side, "There Will Come a Day" later charted on the Hot Country Songs chart in 2001, reaching as high as number 35 solely on unsolicited airplay.

== Cover ==
Australian born Irish singer Johnny Logan covered the song as a duet with Natasja Crone. It was released as single and included on his 2001 album, Reach for Me.

The Italian singer Patrizio Buanne covered this song twice for his album Forever Begins Tonight: in English and in a bilingual Spanglish version.

== Chart positions ==
"Let's Make Love" debuted at number 65 on Hot Country Songs dated for November 20, 1999 based on unsolicited airplay. As an album cut, it reached as high as number 52 and spent 20 weeks on the charts before falling off. Upon its release as a single, it re-entered on the May 20, 2000 chart at number 60.

Chart (2000)	Peak position
Canada Country Singles (RPM)	5
US Billboard Hot 100	54
US Hot Country Songs (Billboard)	6

=== Year-end charts ===
Chart (2000)	Position
US Country Songs (Billboard)	37

== Parodies ==
- American country music parody artist Cledus T. Judd released a parody of "Let's Make Love" titled "Let's Shoot Dove" on his 2002 album Cledus Envy.
