= There You'll Be =

2001 single by Faith Hill

Single by Faith Hill

from the album Pearl Harbor Soundtrack and There You'll Be
- B-side: "There Will Come a Day"; "If I Should Fall Behind"
- Released: May 21, 2001
- Length: 3:40
- Label: Hollywood; Warner Bros.
- Songwriter: Diane Warren
- Producers: Trevor Horn; Byron Gallimore

Faith Hill singles chronology
"If My Heart Had Wings" (2001)	"There You'll Be" (2001)	"Cry" (2002)

Audio
- "There You'll Be" on YouTube

"There You'll Be" is a song by American country music singer Faith Hill. Written by Diane Warren, produced by Trevor Horn and Byron Gallimore, and orchestrated by David Campbell, the song was released on May 21, 2001, and was included on the Pearl Harbor soundtrack. The track also appears on Hill's greatest hits albums There You'll Be and The Hits. "There You'll Be" is about remembering deceased acquaintances and reminding oneself that they will always be with them. The power ballad was first offered to Celine Dion, who turned it down because she did not want to record another romantic ballad for a soundtrack album.

Upon its release, "There You'll Be" became Hill's highest-charting single in the United Kingdom and Ireland, reaching numbers three and four, respectively. The single topped the charts of Canada, Portugal, and Sweden and became a top-10 hit in the United States and several European nations. Despite the film's poor critical reception, music critics responded positively to the song, and it garnered two Grammy nominations at the 44th Annual Grammy Awards as well as an Academy Award nomination at the 74th Annual Academy Awards. The accompanying music video was directed by Michael Bay, who also directed Pearl Harbor. The video is set in the same time period as the film and draws many parallels.

== Composition and lyrics ==
Musically, "There You'll Be" is a power ballad in the key of A-flat major, set in common time. Arden Lambert from Country Daily described the recording as a love song, writing, "The song starts with a mellow tone, but slowly builds up as the track advances. This melody simulates what people feel when they lose someone. Its lines speak of gratefulness to a deceased person who has shown another person that there is more to life. It is a song that looks back on all the experiences they shared together. Ultimately, it is a reminder that even if they are not living anymore, they will continue to provide comfort, as the line in the song says, "I'll keep a part of you with me / And everywhere I am there you'll be".

== Release and airplay ==
Warner Bros. Records serviced "There You'll Be" to US country radio on May 21, 2001, and to contemporary hit radio the following day. Due to the track's usage in Pearl Harbor, many radio stations, especially country-music stations, began playing the single early to build up anticipation for the film's release. The week before its official release, the track received a total of 369 adds, becoming the most-added song on country radio, contemporary hit radio, and two adult contemporary formats for that week. According to Hill's website, "There You'll Be" was the second-most-added song during a single day in US radio history, after USA for Africa's "We Are the World" in 1985. Throughout the rest of northern summer, the song remained a mainstay on US radio. Immediately following the September 11 attacks, airplay for "There You'll Be" increased by 12 percent, allowing it to re-enter the top 75 of the US Billboard Hot 100 chart. A commercial 7-inch vinyl single and CD single were issued in the US in 2001; the 7-inch contains Hill's previous single "Breathe" as its B-side while the CD includes "There Will Come a Day" as a B-side.

In the United Kingdom, "There You'll Be" experienced a spike in airplay in mid-June 2001, receiving the biggest increase in plays and the second-highest number of adds on UK radio on the week ending June 16. Two days later, the single was released physically in the UK as a CD single and a cassette single. While the cassette features the same track listing as the US CD, the UK CD includes a third track: "If I Should Fall Behind". A two-track CD with "There Will Come a Day" was issued in Europe in 2001, and the three-track version was also released in Australia and Japan. In Australia, "There You'll Be" was issued on the same day as its UK release, June 18, while in Japan, the CD was distributed on July 4.

== Critical reception ==
Arden Lambert from Country Daily declared "There You'll Be" as "a lovely ballad", noting Hill's "sky-high vocals" on the song. David Browne from Entertainment Weekly described it as a "ballad [with] orchestration that crests in choruses", stating that "soaring diva" Faith Hill can follow in the footsteps of Celine Dion and Trisha Yearwood. Mary Ann A. Bautista from Philippine Daily Inquirer wrote that it "makes the images of the movie Pearl Harbor come alive in your mind as you listen." A reviewer from Richmond Times-Dispatch noted the song as "vocally soaring" and "string-soaked". Randy Wilcox from The Robesonian called it a "pop gem". In her review of There You'll Be: The Best of Faith Hill, Kathy Korsmo from The Spokesman-Review said that Hill "is an amazing vocalist" and added that her versatility reminds of early Mariah Carey. Chuck Taylor of Billboard compared the song to Celine Dion's 1998 hit "My Heart Will Go On", describing it as having "lush orchestration, a chorus that flies above the clouds, and a vocal that makes Hill's signature 'Breathe' sound like a sleepy lullaby."

== Commercial performance ==
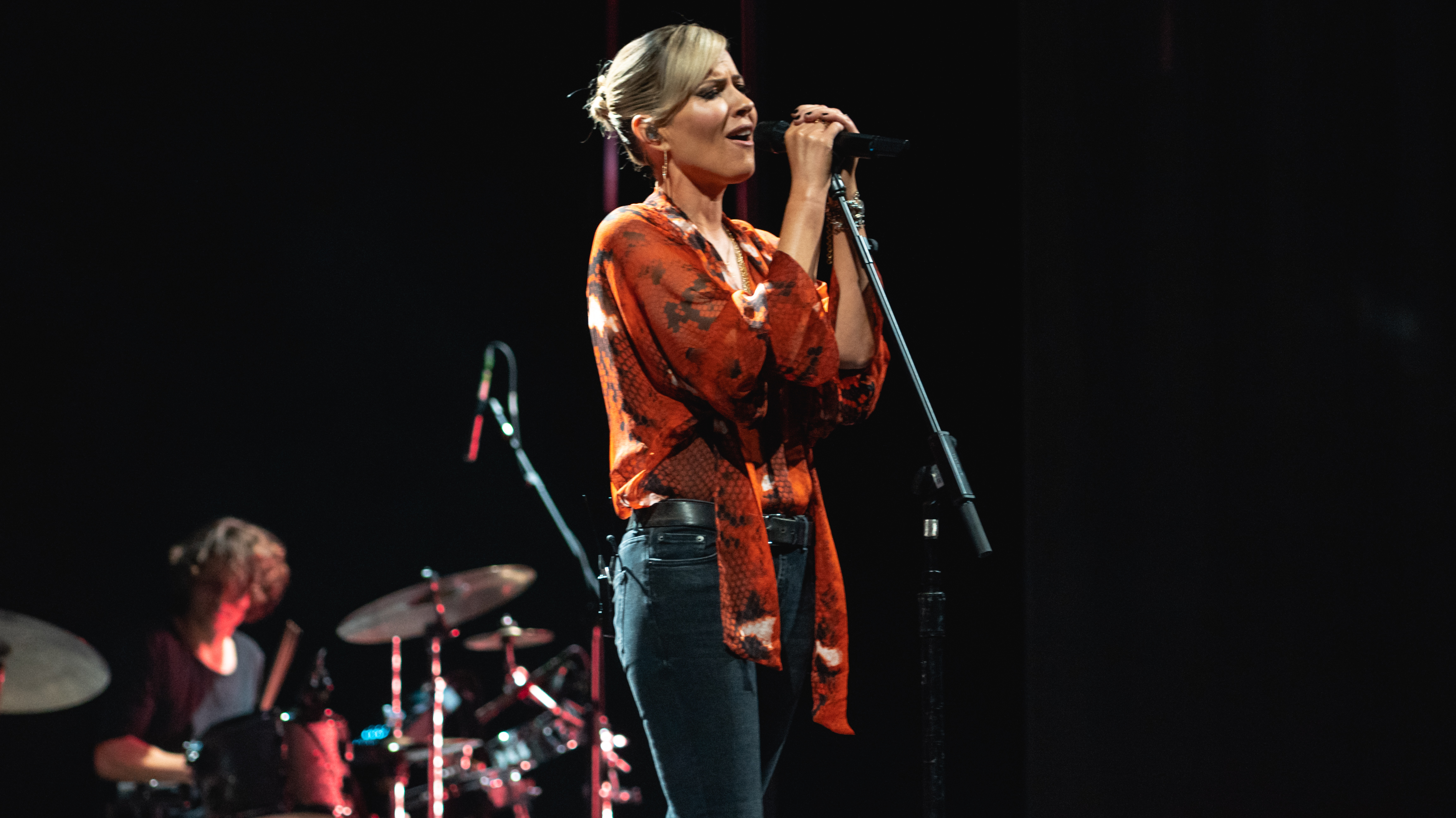
In September 2001, "Thank You" by Dido (pictured in 2019) tied "There You'll Be" at number one on the US Adult Contemporary chart. Three tiebreakers were used to determine the number-one track, with "Thank You" emerging victorious.

On May 26, 2001, "There You'll Be" debuted at number 46 on the US Billboard Hot 100, becoming that week's Hot Shot Debut. The song then rose up the chart and peaked at number 10 on June 30, giving Hill her fifth and final US top-10 hit. The single also reached number 11 on the Billboard Hot Country Singles & Tracks chart. On the Billboard Adult Contemporary ranking, it stayed at number one for 11 non-consecutive weeks. For the issue of September 1, 2001, "There You'll Be" tied Dido's "Thank You" at number one with 1,595 detections—the first time this had happened since Billboard began using Broadcast Data Systems in 1991. Because both songs lost detections, and because the same number of radio stations were playing the two singles that week, a third tiebreaker based on the smallest decrease of plays had to be utilized; "There You'll Be" lost 125 plays while "Thank You" lost 15, so the latter song ascended to number one.

In Canada, "There You'll Be" topped the Canadian Singles Chart for three non-consecutive weeks. In Europe, the single peaked at number one in Portugal and Sweden; in the latter nation, the single reached number one on August 2 and remained at the top for five weeks in total, ending 2001 as Sweden's 10th-most-successful hit. In the Flanders region of Belgium, the song rose to number two on the chart week of August 25 and was the region's 23rd-best-selling hit of the year. Elsewhere, the track peaked within the top 10 in Austria, Denmark, Germany, Ireland, the Netherlands, Norway, and Switzerland. It additionally became a top-20 hit in Finland, Italy, New Zealand, and Spain. On the Eurochart Hot 100, the song peaked at number six. In Australia, it reached number 24 and spent eight weeks on the ARIA Singles Chart.

"There You'll Be" is Faith Hill's highest-charting hit single in the United Kingdom, debuting and peaking at number three on the UK Singles Chart in June 2001 and spending 14 weeks inside the top 100. On September 20, 2008, a contestant named Amy Connelly sang the song for her audition on The X Factor. Her performance renewed interest in the original Faith Hill rendition of the song, and the track re-entered the UK Singles Chart at number 10 the next week based purely on downloads, which gave the song an extra four weeks inside the top 100. It gained yet another week on the chart in 2012, when it re-entered at number 47. The single is certified platinum in the UK and Sweden and gold in Belgium.

== Music video ==
Michael Bay, who directed Pearl Harbor, directed the music video for "There You'll Be" as well. The cinematographer was Allen Daviau, who previously worked with Bay on the video for Meat Loaf's "Objects in the Rear View Mirror May Appear Closer Than They Are". The video shows Hill performing the song interspersed with various scenes from Pearl Harbor. The clip premiered on music television channel VH1 on May 22, 2001, and debuted on MTV on May 24. Country-music channel CMT added the video to their playlist on the week ending May 20, and the following week, it was the channel's number-one video. When the Pearl Harbor two-disc DVD was released on December 4, 2001, the video for "There You'll Be" was included.

== Awards and nominations ==
=== Academy Awards ===
Year	Nominee / work	Award	Result
2002	Diane Warren	Academy Award for Best Original Song	Nominated

=== Grammy Awards ===
Year	Nominee / work	Award	Result
2002	Faith Hill	Best Female Pop Vocal Performance	Nominated
2002	Diane Warren	Best Song Written for a Motion Picture, Television or Other Visual Media	Nominated

== Track listings ==
US 7-inch single
No.	Title	Length
1.	"There You'll Be" (album version)	3:40
2.	"Breathe"	4:10

US and European CD single; UK cassette single
No.	Title	Length
1.	"There You'll Be"	3:38
2.	"There Will Come a Day"	4:16

UK, Australian, and Japanese CD single
No.	Title	Length
1.	"There You'll Be"	3:38
2.	"There Will Come a Day"	4:16
3.	"If I Should Fall Behind"	4:32

== Personnel ==
Personnel are lifted from the US CD single liner notes and the There You'll Be album booklet.

- Diane Warren – writing
- Faith Hill – vocals
- Tim Pierce – guitar
- Ira Siegel – guitar
- Tony Shanahan – bass
- Rich Pagano – drums
- Trevor Horn – production
- Byron Gallimore – production
- Jamie Muhoberac – programming
- David Campbell – orchestration, conducting
- Fiachra Trench – arrangement
- James S. Levine – arrangement
- Bob Brockmann – recording
- Steve MacMillan – additional recording, mixing
- Mike Shipley – mixing
- James Duncan – assistant engineering
- Graham Hawthorne – Pro Tools
- Robert Hadley – mastering
- Sandy DeCrescent – music contracting
- Booker White – music preparation
- Jerry Bruckheimer – soundtrack executive production
- Kathy Nelson – soundtrack executive production, music supervision
- Bob Badami – music supervision
- Bill Green – executive in charge of music for the Buena Vista Motion Pictures Group

== Charts ==
=== Weekly charts ===
Weekly chart performance for "There You'll Be"
Chart (2001)	Peak position
Australia (ARIA)	24
Austria (Ö3 Austria Top 40)	5
Belgium (Ultratop 50 Flanders)	2
Belgium (Ultratip Bubbling Under Wallonia)	5
Canada (Nielsen SoundScan)	1
Croatia (HRT)	5
Denmark (Tracklisten)	7
Europe (Eurochart Hot 100)	6
Finland (Suomen virallinen lista)	14
Germany (GfK)	8
Ireland (IRMA)	4
Italy (FIMI)	11
Netherlands (Dutch Top 40)	5
Netherlands (Single Top 100)	4
New Zealand (Recorded Music NZ)	11
Norway (VG-lista)	4
Poland Airplay (Music & Media)	1
Portugal (AFP)	1
Scottish Singles Sales (Official Charts)	3
Spain (Promusicae)	14
Sweden (Sverigetopplistan)	1
Switzerland (Schweizer Hitparade)	5
UK Singles (Official Charts)	3
US Billboard Hot 100	10
US Adult Contemporary (Billboard)	1
US Adult Pop Airplay (Billboard)	14
US Hot Country Songs (Billboard)	11
US Pop Airplay (Billboard)	23
US Top 40 Tracks (Billboard)	23

Chart (2008)	Peak position
Euro Digital Tracks (Billboard)	20
Ireland (IRMA)	29
UK Singles (Official Charts)	10

=== Year-end charts ===
Year-end chart performance for "There You'll Be"
Chart (2001)	Position
Austria (Ö3 Austria Top 40)	30
Belgium (Ultratop 50 Flanders)	23
Canada (Nielsen SoundScan)	4
Canada (Nielsen SoundScan) "There You'll Be" / "There Will Come a Day"	162
Canada Radio (Nielsen BDS)	14
Europe (Eurochart Hot 100)	51
Germany (Media Control)	49
Ireland (IRMA)	31
Netherlands (Dutch Top 40)	29
Netherlands (Single Top 100)	35
Sweden (Hitlistan)	10
Switzerland (Schweizer Hitparade)	32
UK Singles (OCC)	52
US Billboard Hot 100	66
US Adult Contemporary (Billboard)	13
US Adult Top 40 (Billboard)	57
US Hot Country Singles & Tracks (Billboard)	69

Chart (2002)	Position
Canada (Nielsen SoundScan)	25
US Adult Contemporary (Billboard)	19

== Certifications ==
Certifications for "There You'll Be"
Region	Certification	Certified units/sales
Belgium (BRMA)	Gold	25,000^{*}
New Zealand (RMNZ)	Gold	15,000^{‡}
Sweden (GLF)	Platinum	30,000^{^}
United Kingdom (BPI)	Platinum	600,000^{‡}
^{*} Sales figures based on certification alone.^{^} Shipments figures based on certification alone.^{‡} Sales+streaming figures based on certification alone.

== Release history ==
Release dates and formats for "There You'll Be"
Region	Date	Format(s)	Label(s)	Ref.
United States	May 21, 2001	Country radio	Hollywood; Warner Bros.	
United States	May 22, 2001	Contemporary hit radio	Hollywood; Warner Bros.	
Australia	June 18, 2001	CD	Hollywood; Warner Bros.	
United Kingdom	June 18, 2001	CD; cassette	Hollywood; Warner Bros.	
Japan	July 4, 2001	CD	Hollywood; Warner Bros.	
Canada	August 7, 2001	CD	Warner Bros.	

== See also ==
- List of Billboard Adult Contemporary number ones of 2001
