= The Secret of Life (song) =

"The Secret Of Life"

Single by Faith Hill

from the album Faith
- Released: May 3, 1999
- Recorded: 1998
- Studio: Loud Recording (Nashville, TN); Ocean Way Recording (Nashville, TN)
- Genre: Country
- Length: 4:14
- Label: Warner Bros. Nashville
- Songwriter: Gretchen Peters
- Producers: Faith Hill; Byron Gallimore

Faith Hill singles chronology
| "Love Ain't Like That" (1999) | "The Secret Of Life" (1999) | "Breathe" (1999) |

"The Secret of Life" is a song written and originally recorded by American country music singer-songwriter Gretchen Peters. The song was included on her debut album of the same name in 1996.

The track would become famous when country musician Faith Hill recorded it for her third studio album Faith (1998). The song would be released on May 3, 1999, via Warner Bros. Nashville as the fifth and final single from the album. The track was a success for Hill, hitting number 4 on the US Hot Country Songs chart. It would also reach the runner-up spot of the Canadian RPM Country Tracks and the top-fifty of the Billboard Hot 100. Peters would later re-record the song as an acoustic recording to her 2015 studio album Blackbirds. She notably almost did not perform at the 1999 CMA Awards as the show's organizers wanted her to perform "The Secret of Life" over her then newest single released, "Breathe"; she would still perform "Breathe" where it was noted as a highlight of the night.

== Background ==
Gretchen Peters is a well-known Nashville songwriter. Peters had success during the decade penning hits such as "Let That Pony Run" and "Independence Day". She wanted to write a song based around a group of guys after many of her songs were labeled by Nashville as "women's songs," a term that Peters did not like. Peters included the song on her 1996 debut album, The Secret of Life, issued by the independent label Imprint Records. The track would receive a Nashville Songwriters Association International (NSAI) award in 2000.

== Content ==
Peters' version is performed in E major, with her vocals going from A3 to B4. In the book The Women of Country Music, they described the lyrics as "closely linked to philosophical contemplation about the nature of love, focusing more broadly on that which is significant in life in general." In Faith Hill's 2001 biography Faith Hill: Piece of My Heart by James Dickerson, he describes the conversation between the guys sitting in the bar in that "it all boils down to the fact that it is the little things that make life special." Christopher Peterson included the song in his 2006 book A Primer in Positive Psychology.

== Music video ==
Steven Goldmann shot the music video. The night before the video was to be shot, the original location for the bar that the directors scouted out had a fire and burned. The Palace Saloon in Fernandina Beach, Florida, located on Amelia Island suffered extensive damage to the interior only. The video was first released on May 12, 1999 to CMT where it was labeled as a "Hot Shot". It was then released on June 7, 1999 to The Nashville Network before it was rebranded as Spike TV.

=== Synopsis ===
The video opens with a street shot showing the exterior of The Palace with a banner reading "The Starlight Bar & Lounge" covering The Palace sign, as to follow the lyrics of the song. The exterior is used in several shots including Hill standing at the entrance with the doors closed. The interior of the saloon was rebuilt and remains open to this day and is billed as "Florida's oldest continuously operating bar." The video showcases Hill as an observer to the bar conversation referenced in the lyrics. Scenes of small-town life are interspersed. Throughout the video, various characters hold up photographs that seem to come to life. Some of the interior scenes were filmed at St. Nick's Lounge in Jacksonville, Florida. St. Nick's lounge has been a part of the bar scene in Jacksonville since the late 1940's.

== Critical reception ==
Paulette Flowers of the Portsmouth Daily Times said the single showed a more mature and happier version of Hill. Biographer James Dickerson, author of Faith Hill: Piece of My Heart, called the track one of the two best songs from the Faith album.

== Commercial performance ==
"The Secret of Life" debuted on the US Hot Country Songs chart the week of May 8, 1999, at number 75. The track reached number four on the chart the week ending September 18, 1999, spending 24 weeks in total on the chart.

== Personnel ==
Information taken from the Faith booklet.

- Steve Nathan – keyboards
- Mike Brignardello – bass
- Brent Mason, Dann Huff, Byron Gallimore – electric guitars
- Sonny Garrish – steel guitar
- Glen Duncan – fiddle
- Larry Byrom – acoustic guitar
- Lonnie Wilson – drums
- Aubrey Haynie – fiddle
- Curtis Young and Kim Parent – background vocals

== Charts ==
=== Weekly charts ===
| Chart (1999) | Peak position |
|---|---|
| Canada Country Singles (RPM) | 2 |
| US Billboard Hot 100 | 46 |
| US Hot Country Songs (Billboard) | 4 |
| US Radio Songs (Billboard) | 34 |
| US Country Top 50 (Radio & Records) | 5 |

=== Year-end charts ===
| Chart (1999) | Position |
|---|---|
| Canada Country Tracks (RPM) | 6 |
| US Country Songs (Billboard) | 22 |
| US Country Top 50 (Radio & Records) | 30 |
