= Pearl Harbor (soundtrack) =

2001 film soundtrack album

Pearl Harbor: Music from the Motion Picture
- Official album cover

Soundtrack album by Hans Zimmer
- Released: May 22, 2001
- Genre: Film score
- Length: 46:21
- Label: Hollywood; Warner Bros.
- Producer: Bob Badami; Trevor Horn; Byron Gallimore

Hans Zimmer chronology
Invincible (2001)	Pearl Harbor (2001)	Riding in Cars with Boys (2001)

Pearl Harbor (Music from the Motion Picture) is the soundtrack album to the 2001 film Pearl Harbor directed by Michael Bay starring Ben Affleck, Kate Beckinsale and Josh Hartnett. The album features the film score composed by Hans Zimmer and the original song "There You'll Be" performed by Faith Hill. The album was released through Hollywood Records on May 22, 2001. The score received the nomination for the Golden Globe Award for Best Original Score, while "There You'll Be" received an Academy Award and Golden Globe Award for Best Original Song.

== Background and development ==
Pearl Harbor is Hans Zimmer's sophomore collaboration with Michael Bay after The Rock (1996). Zimmer felt that Pearl Harbor was not "the type of movie [he] signed on for" recalling that two years ago, producer Jerry Bruckheimer provided an animated version of the Pearl Harbor attack put to Zimmer's music from The Thin Red Line (1998) which was the first from his contract he signed on for the film. Eventually, the film's budget was reduced and Bruckheimer prompted to Zimmer to tear up the deal, which had him to be attached on the project very earlier. Bruckheimer described it as a "great love story", which Zimmer liked it and approached the way, although the war being the central conflict. Zimmer added that, he had to deliver music to the love story within ten minutes, as the rest of the other aspects focusing on war, adding:

"Usually you have a whole movie to develop these themes and not repeat them, and build it up. But the job here is ultimately Pearl Harbor - people want to see the bombs drop. It's really difficult because you're forced into a situation where you have to make an audience believe in the love story very quickly. And that's just impossible."

Zimmer did not want to put much action music in the album, making it shorter, as it had to complement the action screen, referencing Gladiator (2000) and instead focusing on the romantic and emotional aspects. Zimmer recalled that the album was completed in less than a night, in the middle of him trying to complete the entire score. As Zimmer completed the score, the following day at 8:00 a.m. in the morning, few members from the music team wanted to take it to the editing room to assemble the music. After the editing was done, Zimmer listened to the final cue, which he felt was slow and boring, though the music team persuaded him to take the album to Philadelphia where it was being manufactured. Zimmer then met editor Bob Badami concerning about how the music was slow, as he was tired. But after adding those timings, the duration went on for 42 minutes, and realized that the album was mastered entirely at the wrong speed. Hence, Zimmer enthusiastically said "stop the presses", a phrase which made him popular, as he found the perfect musical theme for the film. Eventually, another person from his Media Ventures company had sent one of their executives as the person who had the musical album had already on flight when the remastering and editing was happening parallelly.

Faith Hill contributed to the original song "There You'll Be", written by Diane Warren, produced by Trevor Horn and Byron Gallimore and orchestrated by David Campbell. The song was also included in her eponymous greatest hits album and The Hits (2007). Zimmer added that "I don't think it hurts to have a really pretty blone girl who's a major star singing" and it felt useful as her contribution was also being the reason for the soundtrack's success.

== Reception ==
Unlike the film, which mixed reviews, Zimmer's score was acclaimed by music critics as a standalone film, while the film critics found it to be misplaced. The Hollywood Reporter's David Hunter described it as a "relentless blitzkrieg of forgettable music", and Todd McCarthy of Variety said "Score is unusually overbearing coming from Hans Zimmer, with echoes of Gladiator bouncing around throughout." However, Ed Gonzalez of Slant Magazine said that "Hans Zimmer's score has a way of menacingly swelling". In retrospect, Sarah Sicard of Military Times added that "while the overall sound is certainly derivative of just about every war movie score ever made, Zimmer's masterful ability to distill that much flag-waving patriotism in eight tracks just about saves Pearl Harbor from being the worst military movie in history."

Jonathan Broxton of Movie Music UK said, "In a summer (2001) where the majority of the scores released have been greeted with derision or indifference, Pearl Harbor is undoubtedly one of the better efforts to emerge from Hollywood – praise, for sure, but when you think about it, that's really nothing more than faint praise." Christian Clemmesen of Filmtracks, however, added "Overall, it's important to remember that his music isn't terrible by any means. It's simply moronic and juvenile for the context. The album is a very strong listening experience and will likely be a deserving and frequent listen for many Zimmer collectors. He did indeed accomplish his task of composing a beautiful theme, but he stopped there, creating an epic failure, an inexcusable and shortsighted piece of beauty with no respect for history. It's a score that will be a startling disappointment for nearly any historian or fan of serious, dramatic soundtracks. It isn't bad music; it's simply the wrong music." Classic FM ranked the album at No. 10 on Hans Zimmer's best film scores.

== Track listing ==
All tracks are written by Hans Zimmer.

No.	Title	Length
1.	"There You'll Be" (performed by Faith Hill)	3:40
2.	"Tennessee"	3:40
3.	"Brothers"	4:04
4.	"...And Then I Kissed Him"	5:37
5.	"I Will Come Back"	2:54
6.	"Attack"	8:56
7.	"December 7th"	5:08
8.	"War"	5:15
9.	"Heart of a Volunteer"	7:05
Total length:		46:21

== Chart performance ==
=== Weekly charts ===
Chart (2001)	Peak position
Australian Albums (ARIA)	30
Austrian Albums (Ö3 Austria)	8
Belgian Albums (Ultratop Flanders)	21
Belgian Albums (Ultratop Wallonia)	43
Danish Albums (Hitlisten)	30
Dutch Albums (Album Top 100)	91
French Albums (SNEP)	46
German Albums (Offizielle Top 100)	16
Hungarian Albums (MAHASZ)	6
New Zealand Albums (RMNZ)	31
Scottish Albums (OCC)	56
Swedish Albums (Sverigetopplistan)	32
Swiss Albums (Schweizer Hitparade)	12
UK Albums (OCC)	50
UK Physical Albums (OCC)	50
UK Classical Compilation Albums (OCC)	1
US Billboard 200	39
US Top Soundtracks (Billboard)	4

=== Year-end charts ===
Chart (2001)	Position
German Albums (Offizielle Top 100)	92
Swiss Albums (Schweizer Hitparade)	98
US Billboard 200	187
US Soundtrack Albums (Billboard)	12

== Certifications ==
Region	Certification	Certified units/sales
United Kingdom (BPI)	Silver	60,000^{^}
United States (RIAA)	Gold	500,000^{^}
^{^} Shipments figures based on certification alone.

== Accolades ==
Award	Category	Recipient	Result	Ref.
Academy Awards	Best Original Song	"There You'll Be"; Music and Lyrics by Diane Warren	Nominated	
ASCAP Film and Television Music Awards	Top Box Office Films	Hans Zimmer	Won	
ASCAP Film and Television Music Awards	Most Performed Songs from Motion Pictures	"There You'll Be"; Music and Lyrics by Diane Warren	Won	
Awards Circuit Community Awards	Best Original Score	Hans Zimmer	Nominated	
Critics' Choice Awards	Best Song	"There You'll Be"; Music and Lyrics by Diane Warren	Nominated	
Golden Globe Awards	Best Original Score – Motion Picture	Hans Zimmer	Nominated	
Golden Globe Awards	Best Original Song – Motion Picture	"There You'll Be"; Music and Lyrics by Diane Warren	Nominated	
GoldSpirit Awards	Best Soundtrack	Hans Zimmer	Nominated	
GoldSpirit Awards	Best Drama Soundtrack	Hans Zimmer	Won	
Grammy Awards	Best Song Written for a Motion Picture, Television or Other Visual Media	"There You'll Be" – Diane Warren	Nominated	
Satellite Awards	Best Original Song	"There You'll Be"; Music and Lyrics by Diane Warren	Nominated	
World Soundtrack Awards	Soundtrack Composer of the Year	Hans Zimmer (also for An Everlasting Piece, Hannibal, and The Pledge)	Nominated	
