= If My Heart Had Wings =

Single by Faith Hill

from the album Breathe
- B-side: "It Will Be Me"
- Released: January 8, 2001
- Recorded: 1999
- Studio: Ocean Way Recording (Nashville, TN); Sony Music Studios (Los Angeles, CA); Loud Recording (Nashville, TN); Essential Sound (Nashville, TN)
- Genre: Country
- Length: 3:35
- Label: Warner Bros. Nashville
- Songwriters: J. Fred Knobloch; Annie Roboff
- Producers: Byron Gallimore; Faith Hill

Faith Hill singles chronology
"Where Are You Christmas?" (2000)	"If My Heart Had Wings" (2001)	"There You'll Be" (2001)

"If My Heart Had Wings" is a song written by J. Fred Knobloch and Annie Roboff and recorded by American country music singer Faith Hill. It was released on January 8, 2001, as the fourth and final single from her fourth studio album Breathe (1999) by Warner Bros. Nashville.

The song peaked at number three on the US Hot Country Songs chart. It also reached number 39 on the Billboard Hot 100.

A music video taken from a live performance of the song was later released to CMT in February 2001, which was directed by Mike Simon. The song was later performed by Haley Scarnato during the sixth season of American Idol.

== Track listing ==
7" single
No.	Title	Writer(s)	Length
1.	"If My Heart Had Wings" (Single remix)	J. Fred Knobloch, Annie Roboff	3:35
2.	"It Will Be Me"	Gordon Kennedy, Wayne Kirkpatrick	3:46

== Chart positions ==
Chart (2001)	Peak position
US Hot Country Songs (Billboard)	3
US Billboard Hot 100	39

=== Year-end charts ===
Chart (2001)	Position
US Country Songs (Billboard)	30
