= Let Me Let Go =

1998 single by Faith Hill

Single by Faith Hill

from the album Faith
- B-side: "You Give Me Love"
- Released: September 14, 1998
- Studio: Masterfonics, The Music Mill (Nashville, Tennessee); The Bennett House (Franklin, Tennessee)
- Genre: Country
- Length: 4:25 (album version); 4:23 (pop remix); 4:07 (soundtrack version)
- Label: Warner Bros. Nashville
- Songwriters: Steve Diamond; Dennis Morgan
- Producers: Faith Hill; Dann Huff

Faith Hill singles chronology
"Just to Hear You Say That You Love Me" (1998)	"Let Me Let Go" (1998)	"Love Ain't Like That" (1999)

Music video
- "Let Me Let Go" on YouTube

"Let Me Let Go" is a song written by Steve Diamond and Dennis Morgan and recorded by American country music singer Faith Hill. It was released on September 14, 1998, as the third single from Hill's third studio album, Faith (1998). The song features background vocals from Vince Gill. At the 42nd Annual Grammy Awards, it received a nomination for Best Female Country Vocal Performance.

== History ==
"Let Me Let Go" was also remixed into a pop version and used as the soundtrack for the movie Message in a Bottle. The remix was also added to the international version of her album Faith titled Love Will Always Win and the 2001 compilation album There You'll Be. The song was nominated for a Grammy for Best Female Country Vocal Performance at the 42nd Annual Grammy Awards. Faith Hill performed the remix version of the song at the 2000 Grammy Awards ceremony. The footage of the performance was released on the DVD Grammy's Greatest Moments later that year.

In 2000, saxophonist Michael Lington covered the song from his album, Vivid.

== Critical reception ==
The song received a positive review in Billboard, which said, "Let Me Let Go" is a well-written song about moving on after a failed relationship, and Hill's intimate, vulnerable vocal illustrates why she's one of the genre's top female talents. The fact that her voice is combined with Vince Gill's lush, lovely backing harmonies elevates this record to heavenly heights. The production by Hill and Dann Huff is a little more pop-driven than on her previous ballads, but radio seems to be firmly behind this deserving artist, and are willing to stretch with her."

== Charts ==
=== Weekly charts ===
Chart (1998–1999)	Peak position
Canada Adult Contemporary (RPM)	11
Canada Country Singles (RPM)	1
US Billboard Hot 100	33
US Adult Contemporary (Billboard)	10
US Hot Country Songs (Billboard)	1

=== Year-end charts ===
Chart (1998)	Position
Canada Country Tracks (RPM)	51

Chart (1999)	Position
Canada Adult Contemporary (RPM)	73
Canada Country Tracks (RPM)	96
US Adult Contemporary (Billboard)	29
US Hot Country Singles & Tracks (Billboard)	68

== Release history ==
Region	Date	Format(s)	Label(s)	Ref.
United States	September 14, 1998	Country radio	Warner Bros.	
United States	February 23, 1999	Contemporary hit radio	Warner Bros.	
United Kingdom	April 5, 1999	CD; cassette	Warner Bros.	
