= Some Things Never Change (Tim McGraw song) =

Single by Tim McGraw

from the album A Place in the Sun
- Released: April 10, 2000
- Recorded: 1999
- Genre: Country
- Length: 3:56
- Label: Curb
- Songwriters: Walt Aldridge; Brad Crisler
- Producers: Byron Gallimore; Tim McGraw; James Stroud

Tim McGraw singles chronology
"My Best Friend" (1999)	"Some Things Never Change" (2000)	"My Next Thirty Years" (2000)

"Some Things Never Change" is a song written by Walt Aldridge and Brad Crisler and recorded by American country music artist Tim McGraw. It was released in April 2000 as the fourth single from McGraw's album A Place in the Sun. While it went to number 1 in Canada, it peaked only at number 7 in the US, and was the only single from the album not to reach number 1 in the US. It also peaked at number 58 on the Billboard Hot 100.

== Critical reception ==
Deborah Evans Price, of Billboard magazine reviewed the song favorably, saying that the single, "offers a pretty, lilting melody, understated acoustic instrumentation, and another nice performance from McGraw." She proceeds saying that what McGraw lacks in vocal gymnastics he has always, "more than made up for in personality, and the current single is no exception." However, she states that "while the melody tends to grow on you, there's not a whole lot going on otherwise that makes this track grab attention." Kevin John Coyne of Country Universe gave the song a C grade, saying that it "goes nowhere lyrically or melodically, and there isn’t a drum beat or steel guitar hook around to save it.", and that the song is such an "easy listening number that’s so easy to listen to, it might put you to sleep."

== Chart positions ==
"Some Things Never Change" debuted at number 47 on the U.S. Billboard Hot Country Singles & Tracks for the week of April 15, 2000.

Chart (2000)	Peak position
Canada Country Singles (RPM)	1
US Billboard Hot 100	58
US Hot Country Songs (Billboard)	7

=== Year-end charts ===
Chart (2000)	Position
US Country Songs (Billboard)	42
