= Something Like That =

Single by Tim McGraw

from the album A Place in the Sun
- Released: June 28, 1999
- Recorded: 1999
- Genre: Country
- Length: 3:03
- Label: Curb
- Songwriters: Rick Ferrell; Keith Follesé
- Producers: Byron Gallimore; Tim McGraw; James Stroud

Tim McGraw singles chronology
"Please Remember Me" (1999)	"Something Like That" (1999)	"My Best Friend" (1999)

"Something Like That" is a song written by Rick Ferrell and Keith Follesé and recorded by American country music artist Tim McGraw. It was released in June 1999 as the second single from McGraw's album A Place in the Sun. The song reached number one on the US Billboard Hot Country Singles & Tracks (now Hot Country Songs) chart, and peaked at number 28 on the Billboard Hot 100.

== Background ==
"Something Like That" shares songwriting credits between Rick Ferrell and Keith Follesé, two Nashville lyricists. Ferrell first developed the song based on his memories of going to the local county fair in his youth in Ohio. He worked on the song for some time, stumbling upon its central piano melody, before joining forces with Follesé, who added details. An original demo of the song was included on the 2010 compilation The Original Songwriter Demos Volumes 1 & 2.

The song recounts the narrator's youthful experience of falling in love for the very first time at age seventeen. The man is enthralled by a woman at a county fair on Labor Day weekend, and then five years later, sees her on a plane, while the man is heading to Mardi Gras. The bridge talks about how a love can never go away no matter how long the two people are apart. The song has also been known as "BBQ Stain" due to its memorable chorus hook: "I had a barbecue stain on my white t-shirt".

== Commercial performance ==
According to Ferrell, the song was not initially slated to be a single. He stated in an interview that McGraw was adamant to his label, Curb Records, to issue the song: "Tim kind of forced their hand on it," he said. Curb first serviced the song to radio in May 1999. According to Nielsen BDS, the song was the top-played radio single in any musical genre in the 2000s with 487,343 spins from January 1, 2000, to December 17, 2009.

== Critical reception ==
Natalie Nichols, writing for the Los Angeles Times, called it "a breezy recollection of young love" with "clever turns of phrase." Ed Masley of The Arizona Republic called the song "feel-good" and reminiscent of the work of Tom Petty. Kevin John Coyne of Country Universe gave the song an A grade, saying that "through its vivid, detail-laden approach, the lyric effectively hones [sic] in on the fact that the experience of one's first love is, in itself, unforgettable." He also states that the point of the song "is driven home by a sprightly piano hook, toe-tapping rhythm, and wildly catchy singalong-friendly chorus – a one-two punch that helps the record make an impression both as a great lyric and as a fun, catchy listen."

In 2024, Rolling Stone ranked the song at number 110 on its 200 Greatest Country Songs of All Time list.

== Other versions ==
In September 2020, McGraw released a stripped-down acoustic version of the song. McGraw also revealed, around the time of the release of this version, that it is one of his favorite songs to play live. He also performed this rendition live on the CBS special United We Sing: A Grammy Salute to the Unsung Heroes. The next year, the song was covered by singer-songwriter Alex Melton in a pop punk style, featuring vocals from Ryan Scott Graham of the band State Champs.

== Charts ==
"Something Like That" re-entered the U.S. Billboard Hot Country Singles & Tracks as an official single at number 68 for the week of July 3, 1999.

Chart (1999)	Peak position
Canada Country Singles (RPM)	1
US Billboard Hot 100	28
US Hot Country Songs (Billboard)	1

=== Year-end charts ===
Chart (1999)	Position
Canada Country Tracks (RPM)	20
US Country Songs (Billboard)	13

Chart (2000)	Position
US Country Songs (Billboard)	52

== Certifications ==
Region	Certification	Certified units/sales
United States (RIAA)	3× Platinum	3,000,000^{‡}
^{‡} Sales+streaming figures based on certification alone.
