= Faith (Faith Hill album) =

Studio album by Faith Hill
- Released: April 21, 1998
- Recorded: 1997
- Studios: Loud Recording (Nashville, Tennessee); Ocean Way (Nashville, Tennessee)
- Genres: Country; country pop
- Length: 51:05
- Label: Warner Bros. Nashville
- Producers: Byron Gallimore; Faith Hill; Dann Huff

Faith Hill chronology
It Matters to Me (1995)	Faith (1998)	Breathe (1999)

Singles from Faith
- 1. "This Kiss" Released: February 23, 1998; 2. "Just to Hear You Say That You Love Me" Released: May 22, 1998; 3. "Let Me Let Go" Released: September 30, 1998; 4. "Love Ain't Like That" Released: January 16, 1999; 5. "The Secret of Life" Released: April 26, 1999

Professional ratings
Review scores
Source	Rating
Allmusic	3.5/5 stars
Entertainment Weekly	B−
Robert Christgau	(choice cut)
The Rolling Stone Album Guide	2/5 stars

Faith is the third studio album by American country music artist Faith Hill, released in 1998. It is her first album since her marriage to Tim McGraw.

Due to the success of the single "This Kiss" in Australia and the UK, the album was released under the title Love Will Always Win, featuring the title track, a new version of "Piece of My Heart" and two new versions of "Let Me Let Go", which replace "You Give Me Love", "My Wild Frontier", "Just to Hear You Say That You Love Me" and the original version of "Let Me Let Go". Other tracks on this album are mixed differently and remove some of the country elements and replacing them with a more pop sound. In some countries, "It Matters to Me", the title track and hit single from Hill's 1995 second album It Matters to Me, is also included as a bonus track.

"Better Days" was previously recorded by Bekka & Billy on their 1997 debut album Bekka & Billy. "Love Will Always Win" was later issued as a single by Garth Brooks and Trisha Yearwood from Brooks' 2005 album The Lost Sessions. "I Love You" was originally recorded by Celine Dion for her 1996 album, Falling into You.

The album was released on April 21, 1998, and was nominated for the Grammy Award for Best Country Album at the 41st Annual Grammy Awards. It was certified 6× Platinum by the Recording Industry Association of America (RIAA) for shipments of over six million copies in the United States. Two songs off of the album, "This Kiss" and "Let Me Let Go", were both nominated for the Grammy Award for Best Female Country Vocal Performance at the 41st and 42nd Annual Grammy Awards respectively.

== Track listing ==
North American version

No.	Title	Writer(s)	Length
1.	"This Kiss"	Beth Nielsen Chapman; Robin Lerner; Annie Roboff	3:15
2.	"You Give Me Love"	Matraca Berg; Jim Photoglo; Harry Stinson	3:37
3.	"Let Me Let Go"	Steve Diamond; Dennis Morgan	4:25
4.	"Love Ain't Like That"	Tim Gaetano; A. J. Masters	3:50
5.	"Better Days"	Bekka Bramlett; Billy Burnette; Roboff	3:36
6.	"My Wild Frontier"	Franne Golde; Lerner; Marsha Malamet	4:59
7.	"The Secret of Life"	Gretchen Peters	4:14
8.	"Just to Hear You Say That You Love Me" (with Tim McGraw)	Diane Warren	4:29
9.	"Me"	Marv Green; Aimee Mayo	3:50
10.	"I Love You"	Aldo Nova	5:05
11.	"The Hard Way"	Keith Brown; Donna Douglas	3:50
12.	"Somebody Stand By Me"	Sheryl Crow; Todd Wolfe	5:55
Total length:			51:05

International version – Love Will Always Win

No.	Title	Writer(s)	Length
1.	"This Kiss" (Pop Version)	Chapman; Lerner; Roboff	3:17
2.	"Love Will Always Win"	Gordon Kennedy; Wayne Kirkpatrick	5:08
3.	"Me"	Green; Mayo	3:50
4.	"Let Me Let Go" (Movie Version)	Diamond; Morgan	4:09
5.	"Love Ain't Like That"	Gaetano; Masters	3:50
6.	"Piece of My Heart" (Pop Remix)	Bert Berns; Jerry Ragovoy	3:39
7.	"The Secret of Life"	Peters	4:16
8.	"Better Days"	Bramlett; Burnette; Roboff	3:36
9.	"I Love You"	Nova	5:05
10.	"The Hard Way"	Brown; Douglas	3:50
11.	"Somebody Stand By Me"	Crow; Wolfe	5:55
12.	"Let Me Let Go" (Pop Remix)	Diamond; Morgan	4:28
13.	"It Matters to Me" (Japanese and Australian bonus track)	Ed Hill; Mark D. Sanders	3:19

== Personnel ==
- David Angell – violin
- Bob Bailey – background vocals
- Larry Beaird – acoustic guitar
- Bekka Bramlett – background vocals
- Steve Brewster – drums
- Mike Brignardello – bass guitar
- Pat Buchanan – electric guitar
- Larry Byrom – acoustic guitar
- John Catchings – cello
- Beth Nielsen Chapman – background vocals
- Joe Chemay – bass guitar
- Lisa Cochran – background vocals
- David Davidson – violin
- Mark Douthit – saxophone
- Glen Duncan – fiddle
- Connie Ellisor – violin
- Kim Fleming – background vocals
- Larry Franklin – fiddle
- Paul Franklin – steel guitar
- Byron Gallimore – electric guitar
- Sonny Garrish – steel guitar
- Vince Gill – background vocals
- Carl Gorodetzky – violin
- Jim Grosjean – viola
- Mike Haynes – trumpet
- Aubrey Haynie – fiddle
- Tom Hemby – mandolin, gut string guitar
- Faith Hill – lead and background vocals
- Dann Huff – electric guitar
- Ronn Huff – conductor
- John Barlow Jarvis – piano
- Mike Johnson – steel guitar
- Jeff King – electric guitar
- Anthony LaMarchina – cello
- Lee Larrison – violin
- Paul Leim – drums
- Bob Mason – cello
- Brent Mason – electric guitar
- Chris McDonald – trombone
- Tim McGraw – duet vocals
- Terry McMillan – percussion
- Gene Miller – background vocals
- Cate Myer – violin
- Steve Nathan – keyboards
- Craig Nelson – bass guitar, background vocals
- Michael Omartian – piano, accordion, keyboards
- Kim Parent – background vocals
- Chris Rodriguez – background vocals
- Pamela Sixfin – violin
- Joe Spivey – fiddle
- Julia Tanner – cello
- Alan Umstead – violin
- Catherine Umstead – violin
- Gary Vanosdale – viola
- Mary Kathryn Vanosdale – violin
- Biff Watson – acoustic guitar
- Kristin Wilkinson – viola
- Lonnie Wilson – acoustic guitar, drums
- Todd Wolfe – electric guitar
- Glenn Worf – bass guitar
- Curtis Young – background vocals

=== Production ===
- Producers: Faith Hill and Byron Gallimore (tracks 1, 2, 4–7, 10), Faith Hill and Dann Huff (tracks 3, 8, 9, 11, 12)
- Associate producer: Ann Callis
- Engineers: Jeff Balding, Julian King
- Assistant engineers: Jeff Balding, Ricky Cobble, Mark Hagan, Richard Hanson, Joe Hayden, Chris Rowe, Aaron Swihart, Marty Williams
- Mixing: Chris Lord-Alge
- Mixing assistant: Mike Dy
- Mastering: Doug Sax
- Editing: Eric Mansfield
- Assistant: Missi Callis
- Production coordination: Lauren Koch
- String arrangements: Ronn Huff
- Art direction: Sheli Jones, Aimee McMahan, Sandra Westerman
- Design: Garrett Rittenberry
- Photography: Russ Harrington
- Hair stylist: Earl Cox
- Stylists: Lisa Fernandez, Claudia McConnell-Fowler, Jonathon Skow
- Make-up: Stacey Martin

== Charts ==
=== Weekly charts ===
Chart (1998–1999)	Peak position
Australian Albums (ARIA)	20
Australian Country Albums (ARIA)	12
Austrian Albums (Ö3 Austria)	36
Canada Top Albums/CDs (RPM)	10
Canada Country Albums/CDs (RPM)	1
German Albums (Offizielle Top 100)	66
Swedish Albums (Sverigetopplistan)	47
UK Albums (OCC)	177
UK Country Albums (Official Charts)	4
US Billboard 200	7
US Top Country Albums (Billboard)	2

=== Year-end charts ===
Chart (1998)	Position
Canada Top Albums/CDs (RPM)	57
Canada Country Albums (RPM)	3
US Billboard 200	62
US Top Country Albums (Billboard)	9
Chart (1999)	Position
Canada Country Albums (RPM)	3
US Billboard 200	59
US Top Country Albums (Billboard)	6
Chart (2001)	Position
Canadian Country Albums (Nielsen SoundScan)	52

== Certifications ==
Region	Certification	Certified units/sales
Australia (ARIA)	Gold	35,000^{^}
Canada (Music Canada)	4× Platinum	400,000^{^}
United States (RIAA)	6× Platinum	6,000,000^{^}
^{^} Shipments figures based on certification alone.
