= Just to Hear You Say That You Love Me =

1996 single by Chynna Phillips

Single by Chynna Phillips

from the album Naked and Sacred
- B-side: "Free This Feeling"; "Unfinished Business"
- Released: 1996
- Recorded: 1995
- Studio: Criteria Studios; A&M Studios
- Genre: Pop rock; R&B
- Length: 4:33
- Label: EMI
- Songwriter: Diane Warren
- Producer: Desmond Child

Chynna Phillips singles chronology
| "Remember Me" (1996) | "Just to Hear You Say That You Love Me" (1996) |

"Just to Hear You Say That You Love Me" is a song written by Diane Warren and recorded by pop singer Chynna Phillips for her solo debut album, Naked and Sacred, released in 1995. The song was released as the fourth and final single from the album, and peaked at number 64 in Australia in February 1997.

== Charts ==
Chart performance for "Just to Hear You Say That You Love Me"
| Chart (1997) | Peak position |
|---|---|
| Australia (ARIA) | 64 |

== Faith Hill and Tim McGraw version ==
"Just to Hear You Say That You Love Me"
- Promotional cover art, featuring Bugs Bunny

Single by Faith Hill with Tim McGraw

from the album Faith
- Released: May 22, 1998
- Studio: Masterfonics (Nashville, TN); The Music Mill (Nashville, TN); The Bennett House (Franklin, TN)
- Genre: Country
- Length: 4:29
- Label: Warner Bros. Nashville
- Songwriter: Diane Warren
- Producers: Faith Hill; Dann Huff

Faith Hill singles chronology
| "This Kiss" (1998) | "Just to Hear You Say That You Love Me" (1998) | "Let Me Let Go" (1998) |

Tim McGraw singles chronology
| "One of These Days" (1998) | "Just to Hear You Say That You Love Me" (1998) | "Where the Green Grass Grows" (1998) |

American country music singer Faith Hill recorded "Just to Hear You Say That You Love Me" as a duet with her husband Tim McGraw in 1998. It was the second single from Hill's multi-platinum 1998 album, Faith. The single's front and back cover art features Looney Tunes character and Warner Bros. mascot Bugs Bunny, as he appeared in various promotional singles for Warner Records at the time.

=== Critical reception ===
Billboard wrote, "Hill and McGraw's last vocal collaboration, "It's Your Love", spent six weeks at No. 1 on Billboard's Hot Country Singles & Tracks, and it racked up countless accolades. With the momentum they have going into this record (separately and together, their careers are on fire). this looks destined to be another big hit—and deservedly so. It's a well-written tune, and Hill delivers it with full-throated passion. When McGraw comes in, backing up his Mrs., it's easy to see why they are being called the George Jones and Tammy Wynette of their generation. This is a beautiful ballad loaded with star power, and it should push all the right buttons at radio and the cash register."

=== Charts ===
==== Weekly charts ====
| Chart (1998) | Peak position |
|---|---|
| Canada Country Singles (RPM) | 4 |
| US Hot Country Songs (Billboard) | 3 |

==== Year-end charts ====
| Chart (1998) | Position |
|---|---|
| Canada Country Tracks (RPM) | 55 |
| US Country Songs (Billboard) | 28 |

== Release history ==
Release dates and formats for "Just to Hear You Say That You Love Me"
| Region | Date | Format(s) | Label(s) | Ref. |
|---|---|---|---|---|
| United States | May 22, 1998 | Country radio | Warner Bros. Nashville Records | |
