= My Next Thirty Years =

Single by Tim McGraw

from the album A Place in the Sun
- Released: July 17, 2000
- Recorded: 1999
- Genre: Country
- Length: 3:37
- Label: Curb
- Songwriter: Phil Vassar
- Producers: Byron Gallimore; Tim McGraw; James Stroud

Tim McGraw singles chronology
"Some Things Never Change" (2000)	"My Next Thirty Years" (2000)	"Let's Make Love" (2000)

"My Next Thirty Years" is a song written by Phil Vassar and recorded by American country music artist Tim McGraw. It was released in July 2000 as the fifth and final single from McGraw's album A Place in the Sun. The song reached number one on the US Billboard Hot Country Singles & Tracks (now Hot Country Songs) chart, and it peaked at number 27 on the Billboard Hot 100.

== Content ==
The song is an uptempo in which the narrator celebrates his 30th birthday and reflects on the things he will do in the next thirty years.

== Critical reception ==
Kevin John Coyne of Country Universe gave the song an A grade, saying that McGraw "captures that feeling of settling in to who you’re going to be, and the growing confidence that you’re really an adult and that you’ve somewhat established yourself."

== Chart performance ==
"My Next Thirty Years" debuted as an album cut at number 74 on the U.S. Billboard Hot Country Singles & Tracks for the week of April 8, 2000.

Chart (2000–2001)	Peak position
Canada Country Singles (RPM)	6 (Note: "My Next Thirty Years" had not yet peaked when RPM ceased publication in November 2000.)
US Hot Country Songs (Billboard)	1
US Billboard Hot 100	27

=== Year-end charts ===
Chart (2000)	Position
US Country Songs (Billboard)	64

Chart (2001)	Position
US Country Songs (Billboard)	19

== Certifications ==
Certifications for My Next Thirty Years
Region	Certification	Certified units/sales
United States (RIAA)	Gold	500,000^{‡}
^{‡} Sales+streaming figures based on certification alone.
