= My Best Friend (Tim McGraw song) =

Single by Tim McGraw

from the album A Place in the Sun
- Released: October 4, 1999
- Recorded: 1999
- Genre: Country
- Length: 4:39
- Label: Curb
- Songwriters: Bill Luther; Aimee Mayo
- Producers: Byron Gallimore; Tim McGraw; James Stroud

Tim McGraw singles chronology
"Something Like That" (1999)	"My Best Friend" (1999)	"Some Things Never Change" (2000)

"My Best Friend" is a song written by Aimee Mayo and Bill Luther and recorded by American country music singer Tim McGraw. It was released in October 1999 as the third single from McGraw's album A Place in the Sun. The song reached number one on the US Billboard Hot Country Singles & Tracks chart.

== Critical reception ==
Ben Foster of Country Universe gave the song a B+ grade, and wrote that "Sometimes it just takes the right vocalist to find the layers of emotion woven into a lyric that could scan as pedestrian in the hands of another performer. In this instance, Tim McGraw indeed proves to be the right vocalist." He also says that McGraw's "heartfelt performance is bolstered by a pleasant lilting melody and a laid-back arrangement featuring generous amounts of fiddle and steel guitar."

== Chart positions ==
"My Best Friend" re-entered the U.S. Billboard Hot Country Singles & Tracks as an official single at number 75 for the week of October 9, 1999.

=== Weekly charts ===
Chart (1999–2000)	Peak position
Canada Country Singles (RPM)	4
US Billboard Hot 100	29
US Hot Country Songs (Billboard)	1

=== Year-end charts ===
Chart (2000)	Position
U.S. Billboard Hot Country Singles & Tracks	8
U.S. Billboard Hot 100	83

== Certifications ==
Certifications for My Best Friend
Region	Certification	Certified units/sales
United States (RIAA)	2× Platinum	2,000,000^{‡}
^{‡} Sales+streaming figures based on certification alone.
