= Breathe (Faith Hill song) =

1999 single by Faith Hill

Single by Faith Hill

from the album Breathe
- B-side: "It All Comes Down to Love"
- Released: September 27, 1999
- Studio: Ocean Way Recording, Loud Recording, Essential Sound (Nashville, Tennessee); Sony Music (Los Angeles)
- Genre: Country pop
- Length: 4:09
- Label: Warner Bros. Nashville
- Songwriters: Stephanie Bentley; Holly Lamar
- Producers: Byron Gallimore; Faith Hill

Faith Hill singles chronology
| "The Secret of Life" (1999) | "Breathe" (1999) | "The Way You Love Me" (2000) |

Music video
- "Breathe" on YouTube

"Breathe" (1999)
A 25-second sample of the chorus of Faith Hill's "Breathe".

"Breathe" is a song written by Stephanie Bentley and Holly Lamar and recorded by American country music artist Faith Hill. Warner Bros. Records released it on September 27, 1999, as the first single from Hill's fourth studio album, Breathe (1999). The song was produced by Byron Gallimore and Hill. "Breathe" became Hill's seventh number one on the Hot Country Singles & Tracks chart in the United States, spending six weeks at number one. It also peaked at number two on the Billboard Hot 100 chart in April 2000. Despite not peaking at number one, it was the number-one single of 2000. The song earned a Grammy Award for Best Female Country Vocal Performance in 2001. The accompanying music video was directed by Lili Fini Zanuck.

== Composition ==
"Breathe", a power ballad, sees Faith Hill go into a pop style.

== Critical reception ==
In 2005, Blender ranked it at number 167 in their list of "Greatest Songs Since You Were Born". They described it as a "swooning ballad [that] turns country gal into Mississippi queen." The Daily Vault's Alfredo Narvaez said it is a "great song", adding, "if it is not a single already, it must be soon. This song is destined for the prom night halls and the wedding receptions of tomorrow. (Yeah, it's that good and strong.)" In 2026, Billboard magazine ranked "Breathe" number 13 in their list of "The Biggest No. 2 Hot 100 Hits of All Time", noting that the song had peaked at number two, just behind Santana's "Maria Maria" and Aaliyah's "Try Again".

== Chart performance ==
On September 27, 1999, "Breathe" was released US radio, and on February 8, 2000, it was issued as a physical single. The song spent six weeks at number one on the US Billboard Hot Country Singles & Tracks chart, 17 weeks at number one on the Adult Contemporary chart, and one week at number one on the Adult Top 40 chart. The song also reached a peak of number two on the Billboard Hot 100 chart for five non-consecutive weeks starting with the week ending April 22, 2000.

Even though "Breathe" never made it to number one on the weekly Billboard Hot 100 chart, it stayed on the chart for 53 weeks and was ranked the number-one single of 2000 on Billboard's year-end countdown. In 2009, Billboard ranked the single as the 27th-most-successful Hot 100 song of the 2000s. "Breathe" was released in the United Kingdom in May 2000 and reached number 33.

== Music video ==
The music video for "Breathe" was directed by Lili Fini Zanuck. It is notably remembered as one of Hill's most memorable videos and was ranked by CMT at number four in their 2008 list of the 100 greatest country music videos.

== Awards and accolades ==
- 2000 Billboard Music Awards: Hot 100 Single of the Year won
- 2000 Billboard Music Awards: Hot 100 Airplay Track of the Year won
- 2000 Grammy Awards: Best Female Country Vocal Performance won
- 2000 Grammy Awards: Best Country Song nominated
- 2000 Grammy Awards: Song of the Year nominated

== Track listings ==
=== 2000 releases ===
US CD, 7-inch, and cassette single

1. "Breathe" – 4:10
2. "It All Comes Down to Love" – 4:16

Australian CD single

1. "Breathe" (pop version)
2. "Breathe" (Hex Hector mix edit 1)
3. "This Kiss" (radio/pop version)
4. "What's In it For Me" (album version)

UK and Japanese CD single

1. "Breathe" (radio/pop version) – 4:09
2. "This Kiss" (radio/pop version) – 3:18
3. "What's In it For Me" (album version) – 5:36

UK cassette single

1. "Breathe" (radio version) – 4:09
2. "This Kiss" (radio version) – 3:18

Japanese remix CD EP

1. "Breathe" (Hex Hector remix—radio edit 1)
2. "Breathe" (Hex Hector remix—radio edit 2)
3. "Breathe" (main club mix)
4. "This Kiss"
5. "The Way You Love Me" (remix version)
6. "Never Gonna Be Your Lady"
7. "Breathe" (pop version)

=== 2001 releases ===
UK and Australian CD single

1. "Breathe" (Tin Tin Out radio mix) – 3:55
2. "Breathe" (radio version) – 4:10
3. "Breathe" (main club mix) – 10:10

UK cassette single

1. "Breathe" (Tin Tin Out radio mix) – 3:55
2. "Breathe" (radio version) – 4:10

European CD single 1

1. "Breathe" (radio version) – 4:10
2. "Breathe" (Tin Tin Out radio mix) – 3:55

European CD single 2

1. "Breathe" (pop version) – 4:09
2. "This Kiss" (radio/pop version) – 3:16

== Charts ==
=== Weekly charts ===
| Chart (1999–2001) | Peak position |
|---|---|
| Australia (ARIA) | 23 |
| Belgium (Ultratip Bubbling Under Flanders) | 6 |
| Belgium (Ultratip Bubbling Under Wallonia) | 15 |
| Canada Adult Contemporary (RPM) | 1 |
| Canada Country Singles (RPM) | 1 |
| Finland (Suomen virallinen lista) | 18 |
| Ireland (IRMA) | 46 |
| Italy (FIMI) | 46 |
| Netherlands (Dutch Top 40 Tipparade) | 10 |
| Netherlands (Single Top 100) | 95 |
| New Zealand (Recorded Music NZ) | 27 |
| Scottish Singles Sales (Official Charts) | 33 |
| UK Singles (Official Charts) | 33 |
| US Billboard Hot 100 | 2 |
| US Adult Contemporary (Billboard) | 1 |
| US Adult Pop Airplay (Billboard) | 1 |
| US Hot Country Songs (Billboard) | 1 |
| US Pop Airplay (Billboard) | 7 |
| US Top Country Singles Sales (Billboard) | 1 |

=== Year-end charts ===
| Chart (1999) | Position |
|---|---|
| Canada Country Tracks (RPM) | 66 |
| US Hot Country Singles & Tracks (Billboard) | 100 |

| Chart (2000) | Position |
|---|---|
| US Billboard Hot 100 | 1 |
| US Adult Contemporary (Billboard) | 4 |
| US Adult Top 40 (Billboard) | 9 |
| US Hot Country Singles & Tracks (Billboard) | 13 |
| US Mainstream Top 40 (Billboard) | 37 |

| Chart (2001) | Position |
|---|---|
| Brazil (Crowley) | 37 |
| US Adult Contemporary (Billboard) | 18 |

=== Decade-end charts ===
| Chart (2000–2009) | Position |
|---|---|
| US Billboard Hot 100 | 27 |

=== All-time charts ===
| Chart (1958–2018) | Position |
|---|---|
| US Billboard Hot 100 | 158 |

== Certifications ==
| Region | Certification | Certified units/sales |
|---|---|---|
| New Zealand (RMNZ) | Gold | 15,000^{‡} |
| United States (RIAA) (physical) | Gold | 800,000 |
| United States (RIAA) (digital) | Gold | 500,000^{*} |
^{*} Sales figures based on certification alone.^{‡} Sales+streaming figures based on certification alone.

== Release history ==
| Region | Date | Format(s) | Label(s) | Ref. |
|---|---|---|---|---|
| United States | September 27, 1999 | Country radio | Warner Bros. | |
| United States | January 24, 2000 | Adult contemporary; hot adult contemporary radio | Warner Bros. | |
| United States | January 25, 2000 | Contemporary hit radio | Warner Bros. | |
| United States | February 8, 2000 | CD; cassette | Warner Bros. | |
| Japan | February 9, 2000 | CD | Warner Bros. | |
| Canada | February 29, 2000 | CD | Warner Bros. | |
| New Zealand | May 8, 2000 | CD | Warner Bros. | |
| United Kingdom | May 8, 2000 | CD; cassette | Warner Bros. | |
| Japan | August 23, 2000 | Remix CD EP | Warner Bros. | |
| United Kingdom (re-release) | October 1, 2001 | CD; cassette | Warner Bros. | |
| Australia | October 15, 2001 | Remix CD | Warner Bros. | |

== Covers and parodies ==
- Brazilian singer Wanessa Camargo made a cover in Portuguese named "Eu Posso Te Sentir (I Can Feel You)".
- Smartbomb has covered "Breathe" on their CD Yeah. Well, anyway ...
- American singer and voice actress E.G. Daily auditioned with this song for the fifth season of the reality show The Voice.
- Country music parodist Cledus T. Judd recorded a parody of the song called "Breath" (about a person with bad breath) on his 2002 album, Cledus Envy.
- It was performed by Anna Friel as her character Nicky Roman during the third episode of the 2022 country music drama series Monarch.
