= This Kiss (Faith Hill song) =

1998 single by Faith Hill

Single by Faith Hill

from the album Faith
- B-side: "Better Days"; "Somebody Stand by Me"
- Released: February 23, 1998
- Studio: Loud Recording, Ocean Way Recording (Nashville, Tennessee)
- Genre: Country pop
- Length: 3:16
- Label: Warner Bros. Nashville
- Songwriters: Beth Nielsen Chapman; Robin Lerner; Annie Roboff
- Producers: Faith Hill; Byron Gallimore

Faith Hill singles chronology
"It's Your Love" (1997)	"This Kiss" (1998)	"Just to Hear You Say That You Love Me" (1998)

Alternative cover
- International cover

Music video
- "This Kiss" on YouTube

"This Kiss" is a song by American country music singer Faith Hill from her third studio album Faith. It was written by Beth Nielsen Chapman, Robin Lerner and Annie Roboff, and produced by Hill and Byron Gallimore. It was released on February 23, 1998, as the album's lead single.

"This Kiss" became a crossover hit, topping the American and Canadian country charts, peaking at number seven on the US Billboard Hot 100, and reaching number 24 on the Canadian RPM 100 Hit Tracks chart. Outside North America, the song reached number four in Australia and entered the top 30 in Austria, Sweden, and the United Kingdom. It was nominated for two Grammy Awards for Best Female Country Vocal Performance and Best Country Song at the 41st Annual Grammy Awards, losing both to "You're Still the One" by Canadian singer Shania Twain.

== Critical reception ==
Billboard noted the song as "brilliantly produced" and explained further that "this uptempo tune boasts clever lyrics and an infectious melody that are extremely radio-friendly." They complimented Faith Hill's vocal performance as "passionate, jubilant, and thoroughly appealing." In 2024, Rolling Stone ranked the song at number 118 on its "200 Greatest Country Songs of All Time" ranking.

== Chart performance ==
"This Kiss" became Hill's fourth solo number one, and fifth overall, on the US Billboard Hot Country Singles & Tracks chart, and it also peaked atop the Canadian RPM Country 100 chart. The song was a crossover hit, reaching number seven on the Billboard Hot 100 and number three on the Hot Adult Contemporary Tracks charts—Hill's first entry on the latter chart. In addition, it reached number 24 on the Canadian RPM 100 Hit Tracks chart and number two on the RPM Adult Contemporary Tracks chart. The single also experienced chart success outside North America, becoming Hill's first hit outside the continent. It reached number 13 on the UK Singles Chart, number four on the Australian Singles Chart, and number 18 on the Austrian Singles Chart. "This Kiss" also charted in Germany, the Netherlands, and Sweden.

== Music video ==
The song's music video, directed by Steven Goldmann, features Hill in a colorful fantasy-like sequence. She is featured swinging on a nectarine, jumping from flower to flower, and riding flying bees and butterflies. The video features extensive use of CGI technology, and it won the Video of the Year award at the 1998 Country Music Association Awards.

Hill was pregnant with her second daughter Maggie McGraw at the time and she was forced to alter her costuming for the video as a result. In a CMT Video Bio segment, Hill revealed that clothing she tried on and approved for the video just days prior to the shoot, was already too small because of her pregnancy when she arrived on set. A few months after the video's release, Hill (who was further along in her pregnancy by then) performed the song live at the 33rd Academy of Country Music Awards in 1998 while dancing in a giant flower in the center of the stage, as a tribute.

== Track listings ==
US CD, 7-inch, and cassette single

1. "This Kiss" (radio version) – 3:18
2. "Better Days" (album version) – 3:36

UK, European, Australian, and Japanese CD single

1. "This Kiss" (radio/pop version) – 3:18
2. "Somebody Stand by Me" – 5:50
3. "This Kiss" (Mr. Mig mix) – 3:47

UK cassette single

1. "This Kiss" (radio version) – 3:18
2. "Somebody Stand by Me" – 5:50

== Personnel ==
Personnel are taken from the Faith liner notes.

- Mike Brignardello – bass guitar
- Larry Byrom – acoustic guitar
- Beth Nielsen Chapman – background vocals
- Glen Duncan – fiddle
- Sonny Garrish – steel guitar
- Jeff King – electric guitar
- Brent Mason – electric guitar
- Steve Nathan – keyboards
- Chris Rodriguez – background vocals
- Lonnie Wilson – drums
- Glenn Worf – bass guitar

== Charts ==
=== Weekly charts ===
Chart (1998–1999)	Peak position
Australia (ARIA)	4
Austria (Ö3 Austria Top 40)	18
Canada Top Singles (RPM)	24
Canada Adult Contemporary (RPM)	2
Canada Country Singles (RPM)	1
Europe (Eurochart Hot 100)	81
Germany (GfK)	52
Netherlands (Dutch Top 40 Tipparade)	20
Netherlands (Single Top 100)	77
Scottish Singles Sales (Official Charts)	18
Sweden (Sverigetopplistan)	22
UK Singles (Official Charts)	13
US Billboard Hot 100	7
US Adult Contemporary (Billboard)	3
US Adult Pop Airplay (Billboard)	14
US Hot Country Songs (Billboard)	1
US Pop Airplay (Billboard)	14
US Top Country Singles Sales (Billboard)	1

=== Year-end charts ===
Chart (1998)	Position
Canada Top Singles (RPM)	91
Canada Adult Contemporary (RPM)	15
Canada Country Tracks (RPM)	5
UK Singles (OCC)	167
US Billboard Hot 100	25
US Adult Contemporary (Billboard)	20
US Adult Top 40 (Billboard)	50
US Hot Country Singles & Tracks (Billboard)	3
US Mainstream Top 40 (Billboard)	42
US Top Country Singles Sales (Billboard)	3

Chart (1999)	Position
Australia (ARIA)	39
US Adult Contemporary (Billboard)	30
US Adult Top 40 (Billboard)	61
US Top Country Singles Sales (Billboard)	4

== Certifications ==
Region	Certification	Certified units/sales
Australia (ARIA)	Platinum	70,000^{^}
New Zealand (RMNZ)	Platinum	30,000^{‡}
United Kingdom (BPI)	Gold	400,000^{‡}
United States (RIAA)	Platinum	1,000,000
^{^} Shipments figures based on certification alone.^{‡} Sales+streaming figures based on certification alone.

== Release history ==
Region	Date	Format(s)	Label(s)	Ref(s).
United States	February 23, 1998	Country radio	Warner Bros.	
United States	March 3, 1998	CD; cassette	Warner Bros.	
United States	June 30, 1998	Contemporary hit radio	Warner Bros.	
United Kingdom	November 2, 1998	CD; cassette	Warner Bros.	
Japan	May 12, 1999	CD	Warner Bros.	

== In popular culture ==
"This Kiss" was included in the soundtrack for the 1998 movie Practical Magic. Hill performed the song at the 1999 VH1 Divas concert, and it was included on the show's CD and DVD releases.
