= The Way You Love Me (Faith Hill song) =

2000 single by Faith Hill

Single by Faith Hill

from the album Breathe
- B-side: "Never Gonna Be Your Lady"
- Released: February 14, 2000
- Studio: Ocean Way Recording, Loud Recording, Essential Sound (Nashville, Tennessee); Sony Music (Los Angeles)
- Genre: Country pop
- Length: 3:07 (album version); 3:32 (radio remix)
- Label: Warner Bros. Nashville
- Songwriters: Keith Follesé; Michael Dulaney
- Producers: Byron Gallimore; Faith Hill

Faith Hill singles chronology
"Breathe" (1999)	"The Way You Love Me" (2000)	"Let's Make Love" (2000)

Music video
- "The Way You Love Me" on YouTube

"The Way You Love Me" is a song written by Keith Follesé and Michael Dulaney and recorded by American country music singer Faith Hill. It was released on February 14, 2000, as the second single from her fourth studio album, Breathe (1999). It was later released to pop radio on August 15, 2000, becoming Hill's third single serviced to the format. The track utilizes Auto-Tune for Hill's backup vocals.

"The Way You Love Me" was a commercial success. The song spent four weeks at number one on the US Billboard Hot Country Singles & Tracks chart in May 2000, becoming her eighth number-one hit. It later peaked at number six on the Billboard Hot 100 in December 2000, becoming her fourth top-10 hit. Internationally, the song reached the top 10 in Hungary and Spain. Country music website Wide Open Country ranked it as Hill's seventh-best song.

== Composition ==
"The Way You Love Me" moves at a tempo of 102 beats per minute. The song is set in the key of C major but is transposed to D major for the pre-chorus and to E major in the chorus and bridge. The song moves in common time, and Hill's vocals span from G_{3} to B_{4} in the song. In the pop version of the song, Hill's backing vocals are Auto-Tuned.

== Music video ==
The music video for "The Way You Love Me" was directed by Joseph Kahn. It first aired on television the week of August 21, 2000. The video shows Hill as many different characters, including a mother, police officer, robber, waitress, heiress, nurse and meteorologist. Three different edits were made, one using the album version, one using the radio remix and one using the Love to Infinity remix. American filmmaker Jennette McCurdy, who was eight years old at the time, makes a cameo in both the album version and the Love to Infinity remix music videos.

== Track listings ==
- US CD and cassette single
1. "The Way You Love Me" (radio remix) – 3:31
2. "Never Gonna Be Your Lady" – 5:31
- Australian maxi-CD single
1. "The Way You Love Me" (Love to Infinity Recall radio edit)
2. "The Way You Love Me" (radio remix)
3. "Breathe"
4. "The Way You Love Me" (Love to Infinity Master Mix Recall)
- European CD and cassette single
1. "The Way You Love Me" (Love to Infinity Recall radio edit)
2. "The Way You Love Me" (radio remix)
- European maxi-CD single
1. "The Way You Love Me" (Love to Infinity radio mix) – 2:56
2. "The Way You Love Me" (radio remix) – 3:31
3. "Never Gonna Be Your Lady" – 5:31
4. "The Way You Love Me" (Love to Infinity Master Mix) – 6:30

== Charts ==
=== Weekly charts ===
Chart (2000–2001)	Peak position
Australia (ARIA)	31
Belgium (Ultratip Bubbling Under Flanders)	5
Belgium (Ultratip Bubbling Under Wallonia)	8
Canada Adult Contemporary (RPM)	9
Canada Country Singles (RPM)	1
Europe (Eurochart Hot 100)	43
France (SNEP)	58
Hungary (Mahasz)	4
Ireland (IRMA)	40
Italy (FIMI)	21
Netherlands (Single Top 100)	89
New Zealand (Recorded Music NZ)	23
Scottish Singles Sales (Official Charts)	13
Spain (Promusicae)	9
Sweden (Sverigetopplistan)	35
Switzerland (Schweizer Hitparade)	49
UK Singles (Official Charts)	15
US Billboard Hot 100	6
US Adult Contemporary (Billboard)	3
US Adult Pop Airplay (Billboard)	8
US Hot Country Songs (Billboard)	1
US Pop Airplay (Billboard)	20
US Top Country Singles Sales (Billboard)	1

=== Year-end charts ===
Chart (2000)	Position
US Billboard Hot 100	41
US Adult Contemporary (Billboard)	31
US Adult Top 40 (Billboard)	64
US Hot Country Singles & Tracks (Billboard)	5
US Top Country Singles Sales (Billboard)	8

Chart (2001)	Position
Canada Radio (Nielsen BDS)	28
US Billboard Hot 100	27
US Adult Contemporary (Billboard)	5
US Adult Top 40 (Billboard)	34
US Mainstream Top 40 (Billboard)	72
US Top Country Singles Sales (Billboard)	2

== Release history ==
Region	Date	Format(s)	Label(s)	Ref(s).
United States	February 14, 2000	Country radio	Warner Bros.	
United States	August 14, 2000	Adult contemporary; hot adult contemporary radio	Warner Bros.	
United States	August 15, 2000	Contemporary hit radio	Warner Bros.	
United Kingdom	April 9, 2001	CD; cassette	Warner Bros.	
