= Soul2Soul II Tour =

2006–07 concert tour by Tim McGraw and Faith Hill

- Tour by Tim McGraw and Faith Hill
- Associated album: Fireflies
- Start date: April 21, 2006
- End date: September 1, 2007
- Legs: 2
- No. of shows: 118 in North America
- Box office: $30,336,336

Tim McGraw and Faith Hill concert chronology
- Soul2Soul Tour (2000); Soul2Soul II Tour (2006–2007); Soul2Soul: The World Tour (2017)
Tim McGraw tour chronology
| Soul2Soul Tour (2000) | Soul2Soul II Tour (2006–2007) | Live Your Voice Tour (2008) |

The Soul2Soul II Tour was the second co-headlining concert tour between American country music singers, and husband and wife, Tim McGraw and Faith Hill. Beginning as the Soul2Soul II Tour 2006, its shows featured elaborate production values using an open, cross-shaped stage. Performances consisted of a set by Hill and a set by McGraw, with the two sharing duets before, during, and after the individual sets. Over the course of the show, the duets traced a thematic development starting at estrangement and ending in emotional closeness.

The tour capitalized on McGraw and Hill's popularity, both as musical artists and as a couple. It played 74 shows in 56 cities, and sold 1.1 million tickets. The tour grossed almost $89 million during 2006. For the year, it was the third-highest grossing tour in North America (behind The Rolling Stones' A Bigger Bang Tour and Barbra Streisand's Streisand: The Tour); and the fifth-highest grossing tour in the world for 2006.

Soul2Soul II Tour 2006 became the highest-grossing country music tour of all time, a position it still holds as of December 2007. For its accomplishments, it received Pollstar's top Concert Industry Award, the Major Tour of the Year Award, for 2006.

The tour was then continued the following year, as the rebranded Soul2Soul 2007. Some new songs were added to the set list, but the overall structure and theme of the show remained. Soul2Soul 2007 grossed some $52 million. Together, the McGraw-Hill Soul2Soul tour has the highest gross for any multi-year country music tour ever, $141 million, breaking a mark previously held by Garth Brooks. Over 1.6 million people saw the show over its two years. The tour was the highest grossing tour ever by a country artist until Taylor Swift's "The Red Tour" surpassed it in 2014.

== History ==
=== 2006 tour ===
The tour's name was a reprise of the couple's very successful 2000 Soul2Soul Tour. It capitalized on the couple's popularity as a couple: The New York Times wrote that, "Faith Hill and Tim McGraw may be the most popular married couple in country music, and maybe in all of pop music." The pair had three albums on the country charts at the time, Hill's Fireflies and McGraw's Live Like You Were Dying and Reflected: Greatest Hits Vol. 2.

Hill and McGraw first announced the Soul2Soul II Tour on January 30, 2006. It quickly became one of the fastest-selling concert events of the year, with additional shows added in 15 cities due to high ticket demand; Ticketmaster labelled it the fastest-selling show of the year. Ticket sales passed the one million mark with the one-millionth fan attending the first of three shows in Los Angeles at the Staples Center. The lucky fan was given a Dodge Charger as a thank you gift from the couple.

The tour began on April 21, 2006 at the Nationwide Arena in Columbus, Ohio, and after 73 shows concluded on September 3, 2006 at the Mandalay Bay Resort and Casino in Paradise, Nevada.

On May 11, Hill and McGraw announced that the July 5 concert in New Orleans would benefit Gulf Coast hurricane relief efforts. From the beginning, Hill and McGraw have expressed criticism of the government response to Hurricane Katrina and the other Gulf Coast hurricanes. Hill is a native of Mississippi and McGraw is a native of Louisiana. All of the net proceeds of the concert were targeted to Katrina relief efforts in those two states. Tickets for the concert went on sale several days later and within 30 minutes, the 17,000 available seats had sold out. McGraw also played one of his informal "Bread and Water" shows, staged at local clubs after an arena show, with proceeds going to hurricane relief efforts as well.

=== 2007 tour ===

On February 4, 2007, it was announced that the couple would return to the road in the summer of 2007 with Soul2Soul 2007 due to the success of Soul2Soul II. They aimed to visit U.S. and Canadian cities they could not reach in 2006; the restart a year later was to still mainstain a mostly-summertime schedule, to accommodate their school-age children. On March 14, 2007, Tim McGraw announced on an appearance on Good Morning America that the Soul2Soul 2007 Tour would probably be the last time he and Hill would tour together. On March 16, 2007, the same day tickets went on sale for the performances in Canada, both of the singers' websites announced that additional shows had been added in select Canadian cities due to overwhelming ticket sales and it had been announced that the June 21 show in Saskatoon and the June 22 show in Winnipeg were record breaking sales. The 2007 tour established a new record gross during both its two-day stop in Omaha and single day in St. Paul, Minnesota for a single country show.

In 2007, McGraw and Hill played forty-three shows over a nine-week period, with the Jeep brand as the title sponsor. The tour featured the duo's first-ever performances throughout Canada. The routing also includes shows in Lafayette, Louisiana and Biloxi, Mississippi, that were specifically requested by McGraw and Hill as being close to where they grew up.

At the July 28 show in Lafayette, Louisiana, at the close of Tim McGraw's set, a female fan reached out and grabbed McGraw's nether regions. When Hill and McGraw returned for the encore, during their performance of "It's Only Love", Hill blasted the fan, waving her finger and saying into the microphone: "Somebody needs to teach you some class, my friend! You don't go grabbin' somebody else's, somebody's husband's [privates], you understand me?! That's very disrespectful!" The incident attracted considerable media attention, and Hill subsequently went on The Ellen DeGeneres Show to discuss it.

== The stage and the show ==
The tour featured production values and cost usually associated with large-scale rock tours. A multimillion-dollar, unique in-the-round stage set was used. A circular platform in the center of the arena floor was surrounded by a larger circle beneath it, where the band played; vertical scrims could fall down to enclose this area. Performers could disappear or arise through hidden platforms. Extending in all four directions from the circles were long, wide catwalks with mass-motion video screens embedded within them, with fans seated on both sides and at the ends of the catwalks. Moving the whole 130,000 pound production from city to city took 150 roadies, 22 trucks, and 14 buses.

The show, which lasted from two and a half to two and three-quarters hours, was structured as a set by Faith Hill, followed by a set by Tim McGraw; in general audiences responded more strongly to McGraw's performance, hence Hill was placed in the opening spot. Before, in between, and after the individual sets, the two performed together. Throughout, Hill and McGraw used body language to convey the themes of the show; The New York Times wrote that "both singers have an extraordinary knack for making big gestures seem human-size."

The lyrical themes and the physical staging of the duet songs followed a connected thread throughout the course of the show, starting at one end of the emotional spectrum and ending at the other. The opening duet, the bitter "Like We Never Loved At All", was sung by the two at completely opposite ends of the stage, facing away from each other. For the next duets, after Hill's set, they were near each other, but enclosing in a scrim and still not facing each other, as they sang "Angry All the Time" and "Let's Make Love". In the final group of duets, following McGraw's set, the two began to thematically reconcile, including a rendition of Bob Marley's "No Woman, No Cry". In the last song of the night, the two sat knee-to-knee opposite each other, around an old-radio-style microphone, for a hushed performance of "I Need You".

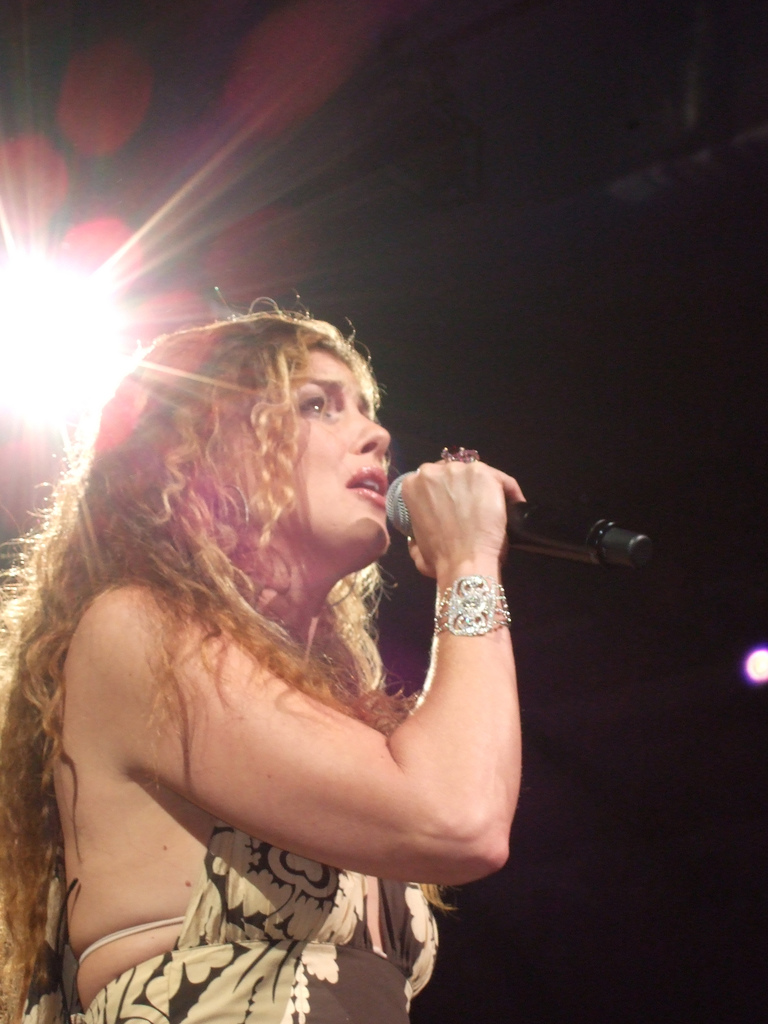
Faith Hill in concert in Dallas on the Soul2Soul II Tour, Photo by Sister Sister Photography.

Hill's performance emphasized her varied country, pop, and gospel flavorings, with arrangements that showcased her vocal control over her lower register. McGraw's performance was more oriented towards traditional country, and evinces a stronger stage presence, with his "Live Like You Were Dying" typically getting the biggest audience response. Hill's band played from the start of the show through the second joint appearance, after which McGraw's Dancehall Doctors backing outfit took over for the balance of the show.

The concerts even featured hints of a rock element, from a few of McGraw's arrangements to Hill's guitarist's U2 textures to the Who-like introductory music to the presence of Kiss and Blue Öyster Cult in the pre-show music.

In the 2007 shows, the general approach and themes were similar, but a number of set list changes were made. The couple started the shows with a rendition of Snow Patrol's "Chasing Cars". New songs in Faith Hill's set included "Wild One", "The Secret of Life", and "Lost". McGraw's set included material that he had not performed in years, including "Indian Outlaw", "Everywhere", and "She's My Kind of Rain". He did omit "Don't Take the Girl", a long-time standby. The 2007 tour saw the addition of opening acts; with their 30-minute performances, the overall evening ran three hours or longer.

== Opening acts ==
No opening acts were used on the 2006 tour.

For the 2007 tour, the opening acts were:

- Lori McKenna (select venues)
- Taylor Swift (select venues)
- Lance Miller (select venues)
- Halfway to Hazard (select venues)

== Set list ==
=== 2006 ===
Hill/McGraw

1. "Like We Never Loved At All"

Hill

2. "Mississippi Girl"
3. "The Way You Love Me"
4. "Sunshine and Summertime'
5. "Fireflies"
6. "This Kiss"
7. "Let Me Let Go"
8. Let's Make Love (with Tim McGraw)
9. "Stealing Kisses" ^{1}
10. " Bridge Over Troubled Water" ^{1} (Simon & Garfunkel cover)
11. "The Lucky One"
12. " Cry"
13. "There Will Come a Day"
14. "Breathe"

Hill/McGraw

15. "Angry All the Time"

McGraw

16. "Real Good Man"
17. "Where the Green Grass Grows"
18. "Just to See You Smile"
19. " Don't Take the Girl"
20. "My Little Girl"
21. "Something Like That"
22. "When the Stars Go Blue" (Ryan Adams cover)
23. "Live Like You Were Dying"
24. "Unbroken"
25. "The Cowboy in Me"
26. "I've Got Friends That Do" ^{1}
27. "Last Dollar (Fly Away)" ^{1}
28. "I Like It, I Love It" ^{1}

Hill/McGraw

29. "Shotgun Rider"
30. "It's Your Love"
31. "No Woman, No Cry" (Bob Marley & the Wailers cover)

Encore:

32. "I Need You"

^{1} Performed at select dates

=== 2007 ===
Hill/McGraw

1. "Chasing Cars" (Snow Patrol cover)

Hill

2. "Wild One
3. "The Lucky One"
4. "The Secret of Life"
5. "Cry"
6. " Sunshine and Summertime"
7. "This Kiss"
8. "Stronger"
9. "Lost"
10. " Red Umbrella"
11. " The Way You Love Me"
12. "The Winner Takes It All
13. "Breathe
14. "Piece of My Heart" (Erma Franklin cover)
15. "Mississippi Girl"

Hill/McGraw

16. "Angry All the Time"
17. "Like We Never Loved At All"

McGraw

18. "The Joker" (Steve Miller Band cover)
19. "Last Dollar (Fly Away)"
20. "Something Like That"
21. "When the Stars Go Blue"
22. "Everywhere"
23. "For a Little While"
24. "She's My Kind of Rain"
25. "Live Like You Were Dying"
26. "Suspicions" (Eddie Rabbit cover)
27. "Real Good Man" ^{1}
28. "The Ride" ^{1}
29. "The Cowboy in Me"
30. "Between the River and Me"
31. "Indian Outlaw"
32. "If You're Reading This"

Hill/McGraw

33. "Shotgun Rider"
34. "Let's Make Love"
35. "It's Only Love"

Encore:

36. "I Need You"

^{1} Performed at select dates

=== Additional notes ===
- At the June 23 New York City concert at Madison Square Garden, Tony Bennett made a surprise guest appearance, and duetted with McGraw on the Hank Williams classic "Cold, Cold Heart".
- At the final concert of the tour, McGraw added some new material from some of his favorite artists – Tom Petty's "Breakdown", "Mama Tried" from Merle Haggard, and "You Look So Good In Love" from George Strait.
- At select dates in 2007, Hill was joined onstage by singer-songwriter Angie Aparo for a duet version of her 2002 hit "Cry." The song was written and originally recorded by Aparo for his 1999 album The American.

== Tour dates ==
| Date | City | Country | Venue |
Soul2Soul II
| April 21, 2006 | Columbus | United States | Nationwide Arena |
| April 22, 2006 | Columbus | United States | Nationwide Arena |
| April 28. 2006 | Rosemont | United States | Allstate Arena |
| April 29, 2006 | Rosemont | United States | Allstate Arena |
| April 30, 2006 | Rosemont | United States | Allstate Arena |
| May 5, 2006 | Auburn Hills | United States | The Palace of Auburn Hills |
| May 6, 2006 | Auburn Hills | United States | The Palace of Auburn Hills |
| May 7, 2006 | Grand Rapids | United States | Van Andel Arena |
| May 12, 2006 | Buffalo | United States | HSBC Arena |
| May 13, 2006 | Pittsburgh | United States | Mellon Arena |
| May 14, 2006 | Lexington | United States | Rupp Arena |
| May 18, 2006 | Madison | United States | Kohl Center |
| May 19, 2006 | Saint Paul | United States | Xcel Energy Center |
| May 20, 2006 | Saint Paul | United States | Xcel Energy Center |
| May 26, 2006 | Birmingham | United States | BJCC Arena |
| May 27, 2006 | Greenville | United States | BI-LO Center |
| May 28, 2006 | Jacksonville | United States | Jacksonville Veterans Memorial Arena |
| May 29, 2006 | Jacksonville | United States | Jacksonville Veterans Memorial Arena |
| June 2, 2006 | Tampa | United States | St. Pete Times Forum |
| June 3, 2006 | Orlando | United States | TD Waterhouse Center |
| June 4, 2006 | Sunrise | United States | BankAtlantic Center |
| June 6, 2006 | North Charleston | United States | North Charleston Coliseum |
| June 7, 2006 | Richmond | United States | Richmond Coliseum |
| June 9, 2006 | Raleigh | United States | RBC Center |
| June 10, 2006 | Charlotte | United States | Charlotte Bobcats Arena |
| June 12, 2006 | Rochester | United States | Blue Cross Arena |
| June 13, 2006 | Albany | United States | Pepsi Arena |
| June 15, 2006 | Philadelphia | United States | Wachovia Center |
| June 16, 2006 | Philadelphia | United States | Wachovia Center |
| June 17, 2006 | Hershey | United States | Giant Center |
| June 18, 2006 | Hershey | United States | Giant Center |
| June 21, 2006 | University Park | United States | Bryce Jordan Center |
| June 23, 2006 | New York City | United States | Madison Square Garden |
| June 24, 2006 | New York City | United States | Madison Square Garden |
| June 25, 2006 | Boston | United States | TD Banknorth Garden |
| June 26, 2006 | Boston | United States | TD Banknorth Garden |
| June 29, 2006 | Washington, D.C. | United States | Verizon Center |
| July 5, 2006 | New Orleans | United States | New Orleans Arena |
| July 6, 2006 | Bossier City | United States | CenturyTel Center |
| July 8, 2006 | Atlanta | United States | Philips Arena |
| July 9, 2006 | Memphis | United States | FedExForum |
| July 11, 2006 | Cincinnati | United States | U.S. Bank Arena |
| July 12, 2006 | Indianapolis | United States | Conseco Fieldhouse |
| July 14, 2006 | St. Louis | United States | Savvis Center |
| July 15, 2006 | Des Moines | United States | Wells Fargo Arena |
| July 16, 2006 | Milwaukee | United States | Bradley Center |
| July 18, 2006 | Kansas City | United States | Kemper Arena |
| July 21, 2006 | Dallas | United States | American Airlines Center |
| July 22, 2006 | Houston | United States | Toyota Center |
| July 23, 2006 | San Antonio | United States | AT&T Center |
| July 27, 2006 | Oklahoma City | United States | Ford Center |
| July 28, 2006 | North Little Rock | United States | Alltel Arena |
| July 29, 2006 | Nashville | United States | Gaylord Entertainment Center |
| July 30, 2006 | Cleveland | United States | Quicken Loans Arena |
| August 2, 2006 | Denver | United States | Pepsi Center |
| August 4, 2006 | Salt Lake City | United States | Delta Center |
| August 5, 2006 | Salt Lake City | United States | Delta Center |
| August 6, 2006 | Nampa | United States | Idaho Center Arena |
| August 8, 2006 | Portland | United States | Rose Garden Arena |
| August 9, 2006 | Seattle | United States | KeyArena |
| August 10, 2006 | Seattle | United States | KeyArena |
| August 12, 2006 | Sacramento | United States | ARCO Arena |
| August 13, 2006 | San Jose | United States | HP Pavilion at San Jose |
| August 14, 2006 | Fresno | United States | Save Mart Center |
| August 17, 2006 | Los Angeles | United States | Staples Center |
| August 18, 2006 | Los Angeles | United States | Staples Center |
| August 19, 2006 | Los Angeles | United States | Staples Center |
| August 25, 2006 | Phoenix | United States | US Airways Center |
| August 26, 2006 | Phoenix | United States | US Airways Center |
| September 1, 2006 | Las Vegas | United States | Mandalay Bay Events Center |
| September 2, 2006 | Las Vegas | United States | Mandalay Bay Events Center |
| September 3, 2006 | Las Vegas | United States | Mandalay Bay Events Center |
Soul2Soul 2007
| June 5, 2007 | Omaha | United States | Qwest Center Omaha |
| June 6, 2007 | Omaha | United States | Qwest Center Omaha |
| June 8, 2007 | Saint Paul | United States | Xcel Energy Center |
| June 11, 2007 | Salt Lake City | United States | EnergySolutions Arena |
| June 13, 2007 | Portland | United States | Rose Garden |
| June 14, 2007 | Tacoma | United States | Tacoma Dome |
| June 16, 2007 | Vancouver | Canada | General Motors Place |
| June 17, 2007 | Vancouver | Canada | General Motors Place |
| June 19, 2007 | Edmonton | Canada | Rexall Place |
| June 20, 2007 | Edmonton | Canada | Rexall Place |
| June 21, 2007 | Saskatoon | Canada | Credit Union Centre |
| June 22, 2007 | Winnipeg | Canada | MTS Centre |
| June 25, 2007 | Toronto | Canada | Air Canada Centre |
| June 26, 2007 | Toronto | Canada | Air Canada Centre |
| June 27, 2007 | Ottawa | Canada | Scotiabank Place |
| June 29, 2007 | Cleveland | United States | Quicken Loans Arena |
| June 30, 2007 | Philadelphia | United States | Wachovia Center |
| July 5, 2007 | Boston | United States | TD Banknorth Garden |
| July 6, 2007 | Boston | United States | TD Banknorth Garden |
| July 7, 2007 | Washington, D.C. | United States | Verizon Center |
| July 9, 2007 | East Rutherford | United States | Continental Airlines Arena |
| July 11, 2007 | Auburn Hills | United States | The Palace of Auburn Hills |
| July 12, 2007 | Grand Rapids | United States | Van Andel Arena |
| July 13, 2007 | Chicago | United States | United Center |
| July 14, 2007 | Chicago | United States | United Center |
| July 17, 2007 | Pittsburgh | United States | Mellon Arena |
| July 18, 2007 | Columbus | United States | Nationwide Arena |
| July 20, 2007 | Greensboro | United States | Greensboro Colisesum |
| July 21, 2007 | Atlanta | United States | Philips Arena |
| July 22, 2007 | Jacksonville | United States | Jacksonville Veterans Memorial Arena |
| July 24, 2007 | Sunrise | United States | BankAtlantic Center |
| July 25, 2007 | Tampa | United States | St. Pete Times Forum |
| July 27, 2007 | Biloxi | United States | Mississippi Coast Coliseum |
| July 28, 2007 | Lafayette | United States | Cajundome |
| July 29, 2007 | Dallas | United States | American Airlines Center |
| July 31, 2007 | Denver | United States | Pepsi Center |
| August 2, 2007 | San Diego | United States | San Diego Sports Arena |
| August 3, 2007 | Glendale | United States | Jobing.com Arena |
| August 4, 2007 | Las Vegas | United States | MGM Grand Garden Arena |
| August 6, 2007 | Sacramento | United States | ARCO Arena |
| August 7, 2007 | Fresno | United States | Save Mart Center |
| August 8, 2007 | San Jose | United States | HP Pavilion at San Jose |
| August 10, 2007 | Anaheim | United States | Honda Center |
| August 11, 2007 | Anaheim | United States | Honda Center |
| September 1, 2007 | Moncton | Canada | Magnetic Hill |

== Box office score data ==
Soul2Soul 2007

| Venue | City | Tickets sold / available | Gross revenue |
|---|---|---|---|
| Qwest Center Omaha | Omaha | 27,709 / 32,355 (86%) | $2,375,328 |
| Xcel Energy Center | Saint Paul | 16,692 / 16,692 (100%) | $1,432,515 |
| EnergySolutions Arena | Salt Lake City | 11,289 / 12,049 (94%) | $944,919 |
| Rose Garden | Portland | 9,031 / 9,516 (95%) | $810,731 |
| Tacoma Dome | Tacoma | 11,655 / 13,752 (85%) | $998,284 |
| GM Place | Vancouver | 29,047 / 31,059 (94%) | $2,941,495 |
| Continental Airlines Arena | East Rutherford | 15,586 / 17,117 (91%) | $1,411,791 |
| The Palace of Auburn Hills | Auburn Hills | 15,736 / 17,247 (91%) | $1,297,244 |
| Van Andel Arena | Grand Rapids | 10,198 / 10,198 (100%) | $834,530 |
| United Center | Chicago | 27,216 / 36,835 (74%) | $2,272,281 |
| BankAtlantic Center | Sunrise | 9,277 / 12,043 (77%) | $832,318 |
| St. Pete Forum | Tampa | 11,458 / 15,592 (73%) | $1,034,837 |
| Mississippi Coast Coliseum | Biloxi | 10,805 / 10,805 (100%) | $752,960 |
| Cajundome | Lafayette | 11,064 / 11,064 (100%) | $953,500 |
| American Airlines Center | Dallas | 13,257 / 16,475 (80%) | $1,132,915 |
| Pepsi Center | Denver | 13,922 / 15,748 (88%) | $1,192,242 |
| San Diego Sports Arena | San Diego | 9,579 / 12,709 (75%) | $816,506 |
| Jobing.com Arena | Glendale | 12,848 / 16,624 (77%) | $1,208,958 |
| MGM Grand Garden Arena | Las Vegas | 13,736 / 13,736 (100%) | $1,437,338 |
| ARCO Arena | Sacramento | 13,299 / 14,437 (92%) | $1,186,941 |
| Save Mart Center | Fresno | 10,884 / 14,029 (78%) | $906,730 |
| HP Pavilion at San Jose | San Jose | 13,097 / 17,134 (76%) | 1,035,760 |
| Honda Center | Anaheim | 25,068 / 28,745 (87%) | $2,526,213 |
| Total | | 342,453 / 395,961 (86%) | $30,336,336 |

== Personnel ==
Hill

- Guitar: Pat Buchanan, Denny Hemingson and Jerry McPherson
- Bass guitar: Paul Bushnell
- Acoustic guitar: Faith Hill and Bob Minner
- Keyboards: Jimmy Nichols
- Drums: Paul Leim
- Backing vocals: Crystal Taliefero, Perry Coleman, and Wendy Moten

McGraw (The Dancehall Doctors)

- Guitar: Denny Hemingson and Darran Smith
- Acoustic guitar / Resonator Guitar: Bob Minner
- Bass guitar: John Marcus
- Keyboards: Jeff McMahon
- Drums: David Dunkley and Billy Mason
