= Soul2Soul: The World Tour =

2017–18 concert tour by Tim McGraw and Faith Hill

- Tour by Tim McGraw and Faith Hill
- Promotional poster for the tour.
- Start date: April 7, 2017
- End date: July 24, 2018
- Legs: 3
- No. of shows: 109 North America; 3 in Europe; 112 total
- Box office: $100.3 million 107 Shows

Tim McGraw and Faith Hill concert chronology
- Soul2Soul II Tour (2006–07); Soul2Soul: The World Tour (2017)
Tim McGraw tour chronology
Shotgun Rider Tour (2016)	Soul2Soul: The World Tour (2017)	Here On Earth Tour (2020)
Faith Hill tour chronology
Tim McGraw & Faith Hill Australia 2012 Tour (2012)	Soul2Soul: The World Tour (2017)

The Soul2Soul: The World Tour is the third co-headlining tour by American country music recording artists, and husband and wife, Tim McGraw and Faith Hill. It marked the first time the duo have toured together since 2007. It began on April 7, 2017, in New Orleans. Performances consist of a setlist of duets between the couple and solos. The first leg of the tour played seventy shows, and as of December 11, 2017, every show was sold out, and grossed over 79 million dollars. According to Pollstar's 2017 Mid-Year report, it was ranked the 24th best tour.

== Background ==
In October 2016, a special concert was planned at the Ryman Auditorium in Nashville. Under the moniker "Sam & Audrey", the duo performed their hits, while announcing the forthcoming 2017 tour. The itinerary was released the following day. On January 31, 2017, McGraw and Hill announced the opening acts via Facebook Live. Each weekend will feature a different opening act, handpicked by the duo. They also revealed additional tour dates and plans to perform shows outside North America. When introducing the tour, Hill stated:

"We have the best fans in the world, who have been with us through our entire journey and we are so excited to celebrate with them by going back on the road and showcasing an exciting new show. It's always great when we get to work together and it's been awhile since we got to do that."

On September 28, 2017, Bob Harris revealed on his BBC Radio 2 show that McGraw and Hill were the first announced headliners for the 2018 C2C: Country to Country festival which takes place in London, Glasgow and Dublin. In November 2017, a second American leg of the tour was announced.

== The show and the stage ==
The show begins with a ten-second countdown clock, after that futuristic music begins to play. Hill and McGraw begin to say a speech which ends with, "face to face, heart to heart, and soul to soul." Then two black boxes rise up onto the b-stage, as the boxes descends both Hill and McGraw appear, and perform Aretha Franklin and George Michael's "I Knew You Were Waiting For Me". During "Break First" (a new pop centric song from the couple), the video screens displays fragments of glass shattering behind them. When McGraw performs "Angry All the Time", Hill plays the acoustic guitar while singing background vocals. The show lasts for two hours and fifteen minutes with a setlist of thirty songs. They go back and forth singing with each other and alone during solos. McGraw and Hill perform their past hits and songs off their upcoming album. They close with "I Need You".

The stage and production is made up of laser lights, risers, special effects, eighty-foot wide video board, HD and LED screens. During the show family photos are projected onto the eighty-foot wide video board. A ten-piece band backs the couple.

== Opening acts ==
- Kelsea Ballerini
- Brothers Osborne
- Cam
- Brandy Clark
- Brent Cobb
- Devin Dawson
- Seth Ennis
- Rhiannon Giddens
- Natalie Hemby
- High Valley
- Chris Janson
- Joseph
- Chris Lane
- LoCash
- Lori McKenna
- Midland
- Old Dominion
- Steve Moakler
- NEEDTOBREATHE
- Jon Pardi
- Eric Paslay
- Rachel Platten
- Margo Price
- Ben Rector
- Maggie Rose
- The Shadowboxers
- Caitlyn Smith
- Charlie Worsham

== Setlist ==
The following setlist was performed at the concert held on April 21, 2017, at the Legacy Arena in Birmingham, Alabama. It does not represent all concerts for the duration of the tour.

McGraw and Hill

1. "I Knew You Were Waiting (For Me)" (Aretha Franklin & George Michael cover)

McGraw

2. "Felt Good on My Lips"

Hill

3. "The Lucky One"

McGraw

4. "I Like It, I Love It"

Hill

5. "The Way You Love Me"

McGraw and Hill

6. "Like We Never Loved at All"
7. "Break First"
8. "Telluride"
9. "Devil Calling Me Back"

Hill

10. "Free"
11. "This Kiss"
12. "Breathe"
13. "Wild One"
14. "Stronger"
15. "Piece of My Heart"

McGraw and Hill

16. "Angry All the Time"

McGraw

17. "One of Those Nights"
18. "Real Good Man"
19. "Shotgun Rider"
20. "Humble and Kind"
21. "Live Like You Were Dying"

McGraw and Hill

22. "Speak to a Girl"
23. "It's Your Love"

Hill

24. "Mississippi Girl"

McGraw

25. "Something Like That"

McGraw and Hill

26. "I Need You"

== Tour dates ==
Date	City	Country	Venue	Opening acts	Attendance	Revenue
North America Leg 1
April 7, 2017	New Orleans	United States	Smoothie King Center	Brothers Osborne	14,959 / 14,959	$1,324,355
April 9, 2017	Tupelo	United States	BancorpSouth Arena	Brothers Osborne	8,323 / 8,323	$685,612
April 20, 2017	North Charleston	United States	North Charleston Coliseum	NEEDTOBREATHE	9,097 / 9,097	$798,478
April 21, 2017	Birmingham	United States	Legacy Arena	NEEDTOBREATHE	11,259 / 11,259	$821,751
April 23, 2017	Atlanta	United States	Philips Arena	NEEDTOBREATHE	13,033 / 13,033	$1,170,004
April 27, 2017	St. Louis	United States	Scottrade Center	Seth Ennis	12,906 / 12,906	$1,066,330
April 28, 2017	Louisville	United States	KFC Yum! Center	Seth Ennis	14,653 / 14,653	$1,220,499
April 29, 2017	Indianapolis	United States	Bankers Life Fieldhouse	Seth Ennis	12,726 / 12,726	$999,040
May 4, 2017	Newark	United States	Prudential Center	The Shadowboxers	11,815 / 11,815	$1,134,267
May 5, 2017	Uncasville	United States	Mohegan Sun Arena	The Shadowboxers	11,686 / 11,686	$1,532,244
May 6, 2017	Uncasville	United States	Mohegan Sun Arena	The Shadowboxers	11,686 / 11,686	$1,532,244
May 11, 2017	Tulsa	United States	BOK Center	Jon Pardi	11,391 / 11,391	$818,172
May 12, 2017	Lincoln	United States	Pinnacle Bank Arena	Jon Pardi	13,853 / 13,853	$1,262,422
May 13, 2017	Oklahoma City	United States	Chesapeake Energy Arena	Jon Pardi	11,490 / 11,490	$859,619
May 18, 2017	Spokane	United States	Spokane Veterans Memorial Arena	Chris Lane	10,700 / 10,700	$887,903
May 19, 2017	Bozeman	United States	Brick Breeden Fieldhouse	Chris Lane	15,544 / 15,544	$1,181,828
May 20, 2017	Bozeman	United States	Brick Breeden Fieldhouse	Chris Lane	15,544 / 15,544	$1,181,828
May 25, 2017	Boise	United States	Taco Bell Arena	Joseph	9,156 / 9,156	$829,945
May 26, 2017	Portland	United States	Moda Center	Joseph	13,736 / 13,736	$1,192,723
May 27, 2017	Tacoma	United States	Tacoma Dome	Joseph	16,744 / 16,744	$1,321,429
May 31, 2017	Vancouver	Canada	Rogers Arena	Midland	12,756 / 12,756	$1,021,510
June 2, 2017	Calgary	Canada	Scotiabank Saddledome	Midland	12,765 / 12,765	$1,170,500
June 3, 2017	Edmonton	Canada	Rogers Place	Midland	13,358 / 13,358	$1,126,310
June 4, 2017	Saskatoon	Canada	SaskTel Centre	Midland	12,709 / 12,709	$1,095,770
June 7, 2017	Winnipeg	Canada	MTS Centre	Caitlyn Smith	11,581 / 11,581	$915,797
June 9, 2017	Sioux Falls	United States	Denny Sanford Premier Center	Caitlyn Smith	11,127 / 11,127	$1,088,360
June 10, 2017	Des Moines	United States	Wells Fargo Arena	Caitlyn Smith	13,236 / 13,236	$1,256,399
June 15, 2017	Grand Rapids	United States	Van Andel Arena	High Valley	11,788 / 11,788	$1,079,900
June 16, 2017	Milwaukee	United States	BMO Harris Bradley Center	High Valley	12,137 / 12,137	$974,098
June 17, 2017	Moline	United States	iWireless Center	High Valley	10,670 / 10,670	$891,006
June 22, 2017	Ottawa	Canada	Canadian Tire Centre	Charlie Worsham	13,396 / 13,396	$1,112,650
June 23, 2017	Toronto	Canada	Air Canada Centre	Charlie Worsham	26,956 / 26,956	$2,241,830
June 24, 2017	Toronto	Canada	Air Canada Centre	Charlie Worsham	26,956 / 26,956	$2,241,830
July 7, 2017	Boston	United States	TD Garden	Lori McKenna	24,187 / 24,187	$2,132,287
July 8, 2017	Boston	United States	TD Garden	Lori McKenna	24,187 / 24,187	$2,132,287
July 13, 2017	Las Vegas	United States	T-Mobile Arena	Rachel Platten	6,611 / 6,611	$783,705
July 14, 2017	Los Angeles	United States	Staples Center	Rachel Platten	25,571 / 25,571	$2,028,973
July 15, 2017	Los Angeles	United States	Staples Center	Rachel Platten	25,571 / 25,571	$2,028,973
July 21, 2017	Glendale	United States	Gila River Arena	Rhiannon Giddens	13,540 / 13,540	$1,264,313
July 22, 2017	Ontario	United States	Citizens Business Bank Arena	Rhiannon Giddens	8,903 / 8,903	$963,746
July 23, 2017	San Diego	United States	Valley View Casino Center	Rhiannon Giddens	10,290 / 10,290	$846,246
July 28, 2017	Sacramento	United States	Golden 1 Center	Devin Dawson	13,540 / 13,540	$1,413,260
July 29, 2017	San Jose	United States	SAP Center	Devin Dawson	12,385 / 12,385	$1,122,601
July 31, 2017	Denver	United States	Pepsi Center	Devin Dawson	23,073 / 23,073	$1,568,171
August 1, 2017	Denver	United States	Pepsi Center	Devin Dawson	23,073 / 23,073	$1,568,171
August 3, 2017	North Little Rock	United States	Verizon Arena	-		
August 4, 2017	Nashville	United States	Bridgestone Arena	Andra Day	28,357 / 28,357	$2,231,533
August 5, 2017	Nashville	United States	Bridgestone Arena	Andra Day	28,357 / 28,357	$2,231,533
August 17, 2017	Cleveland	United States	Quicken Loans Arena	Maggie Rose	11,290 / 11,290	$834,495
August 18, 2017	Philadelphia	United States	Wells Fargo Center	Maggie Rose	14,370 / 14,370	$1,115,596
August 19, 2017	Albany	United States	Times Union Center	Maggie Rose	9,094 / 9,094	$667,410
August 24, 2017	Fargo	United States	Fargodome	Natalie Hemby	14,146 / 14,146	$1,097,627
August 25, 2017	Saint Paul	United States	Xcel Energy Center	Natalie Hemby	29,842 / 29,842	$2,815,245
August 26, 2017	Saint Paul	United States	Xcel Energy Center	Natalie Hemby	29,842 / 29,842	$2,815,245
August 31, 2017	Rosemont	United States	Allstate Arena	Ben Rector	22,912 / 22,912	$1,797,553
September 1, 2017	Rosemont	United States	Allstate Arena	Ben Rector	22,912 / 22,912	$1,797,553
September 2, 2017	Cincinnati	United States	U.S. Bank Arena	Ben Rector	11,456 / 11,456	$780,635
September 7, 2017	Columbus	United States	Nationwide Arena	Brent Cobb	13,822 / 13,822	$1,223,715
September 8, 2017	Auburn Hills	United States	The Palace of Auburn Hills	Brent Cobb	13,445 / 13,445	$1,212,946
September 9, 2017	Fort Wayne	United States	Allen County War Memorial Coliseum	Brent Cobb	9,602 / 9,602	$800,062
September 14, 2017	Knoxville	United States	Thompson–Boling Arena	Eric Paslay	8,164 / 8,164	$628,975
September 15, 2017	Greenville	United States	Bon Secours Wellness Arena	Eric Paslay	10,470 / 10,470	$849,741
September 16, 2017	Jacksonville	United States	Jacksonville Veterans Memorial Arena	Eric Paslay	10,651 / 10,651	$798,041
September 21, 2017	Wichita	United States	Intrust Bank Arena	Brandy Clark	10,982 / 10,982	$889,516
September 22, 2017	Omaha	United States	CenturyLink Center Omaha	Brandy Clark	14,277 / 14,277	$1,054,164
September 23, 2017	Kansas City	United States	Sprint Center	Brandy Clark	13,132 / 13,132	$1,083,278
September 27, 2017	Salt Lake City	United States	Vivint Smart Home Arena	Cam	12,528 / 12,528	$1,189,950
September 29, 2017	Fresno	United States	Save Mart Center	Cam	11,703 / 11,703	$1,033,055
September 30, 2017	Bakersfield	United States	Rabobank Arena	Cam	8,741 / 8,741	$828,635
October 5, 2017	San Antonio	United States	AT&T Center	Chris Janson	11,471 / 11,471	$934,996
October 6, 2017	Houston	United States	Toyota Center	Chris Janson	11,284 / 11,284	$987,317
October 7, 2017	Dallas	United States	American Airlines Center	Chris Janson	13,255 / 13,255	$1,260,647
October 12, 2017	Pittsburgh	United States	PPG Paints Arena	Steve Moakler	11,414 / 11,414	$885,368
October 13, 2017	Washington, D.C.	United States	Capital One Arena	Steve Moakler	13,537 / 13,537	$1,200,627
October 14, 2017	Greensboro	United States	Greensboro Coliseum	Steve Moakler	12,043 / 12,043	$974,210
October 19, 2017	Sunrise	United States	BB&T Center	LoCash	9,281 / 9,281	$667,022
October 20, 2017	Tampa	United States	Amalie Arena	LoCash	12,108 / 12,108	$960,177
October 21, 2017	Orlando	United States	Amway Center	LoCash	12,071 / 12,071	$1,058,484
October 26, 2017	Buffalo	United States	KeyBank Center	Margo Price	12,042 / 12,042	$909,707
October 27, 2017	Brooklyn	United States	Barclays Center	Margo Price	12,501 / 12,501	$1,023,077
Europe
March 9, 2018	London^{[A]}	England	The O_{2} Arena	Kelsea Ballerini; Old Dominion	38,384 / 45,680	$4,275,820
March 10, 2018	Glasgow^{[A]}	Scotland	SSE Hydro	Kelsea Ballerini; Old Dominion	15,099 / 17,220	$1,467,540
March 11, 2018	Dublin^{[A]}	Ireland	3Arena	Kelsea Ballerini; Old Dominion		
North America Leg 2
May 31, 2018	Richmond	United States	Richmond Coliseum	—	9,489 / 9,489	$873,206
June 1, 2018	Charleston	United States	Charleston Civic Center	—	8,483 / 8,483	$647,498
June 2, 2018	Lexington	United States	Rupp Arena	—	9,560 / 9,560	$643,856
June 5, 2018	Baltimore	United States	Royal Farms Arena	—	10,899 / 10,899	$727,114
June 7, 2018	Grand Rapids	United States	Van Andel Arena	—	10,936 / 10,936	$816,874
June 8, 2018	Toledo	United States	Huntington Center	—	14,963 / 14,963	$1,268,897
June 9, 2018	Toledo	United States	Huntington Center	—	14,963 / 14,963	$1,268,897
June 12, 2018	Hershey	United States	Giant Center	—	9,257 / 9,257	$905,605
June 14, 2018	Uniondale	United States	Nassau Veterans Memorial Coliseum	—	8,734 / 8,734	$751,624
June 15, 2018	Uncasville	United States	Mohegan Sun Arena	—	7,807 / 7,807	$781,038
June 16, 2018	Manchester	United States	SNHU Arena	—	8,499 / 8,499	$772,539
June 18, 2018	Hamilton	Canada	FirstOntario Centre	—	10,708 / 10,708	$797,048
June 19, 2018	London	Canada	Budweiser Gardens	—	7,887 / 7,887	$743,975
June 22, 2018	Raleigh	United States	PNC Arena	—	12,093 / 12,093	$859,715
June 23, 2018	Duluth	United States	Infinite Energy Arena	—	9,912 / 9,912	$674,997
June 26, 2018	Bossier City	United States	CenturyLink Center	—	10,228 / 10,228	$598,411
June 29, 2018	Springfield	United States	JQH Arena	—	8,024 / 8,024	$644,900
June 30, 2018	Des Moines	United States	Wells Fargo Arena	—	11,436 / 11,436	$839,144
July 6, 2018	Green Bay	United States	Resch Center	—	8,242 / 8,242	$875,724
July 7, 2018	Minneapolis	United States	Target Center	—	11,748 / 11,748	$712,738
July 8, 2018	Sioux Falls	United States	Denny Sanford Premier Center	—	8,797 / 8,797	$695,622
July 10, 2018	Grand Forks	United States	Ralph Engelstad Arena	—	6,512 / 6,512	$387,300
July 13, 2018	Seattle	United States	KeyArena	—	11,146 / 11,146	$842,978
July 14, 2018	Eugene	United States	Matthew Knight Arena	—	9,413 / 9,413	$781,752
July 18, 2018	Salt Lake City	United States	Vivint Smart Home Arena	—	12,405 / 12,405	$992,034
July 20, 2018	Phoenix	United States	Talking Stick Resort Arena	—	12,773 / 12,773	$886,518
July 21, 2018	Los Angeles	United States	Staples Center	—	11,812 / 11,812	$803,817
July 22, 2018	Sacramento	United States	Golden 1 Center	—	12,189 / 12,189	$944,746
July 24, 2018	Paso Robles	United States	Mid State Fair	—	—	—
Total					1,261,076 / 1,270,493	$106,110,993

A. These shows will be part of the C2C: Country to Country festival.

== Critical reception ==
Tulsa World's Andrea Eger says "the electricity they generated could have powered their megawatt stage production with no help from PSO" According to the Orange County Register's Kelli Sky Fadroski, she was impressed with Hill's return to the tour stage stating that "she brought her A game" during her solo moments. For the duo's performance she described it as, "a connection and tenderness between them that just can't be faked."

Reviewing the show in London, Pip Ellwood-Hughes of Entertainment Focus gave the set a 4.5/5 rating, stating that booking country music royalty McGraw and Hill was "a real coup for the Country to Country festival and stating that they were "warm and funny on stage" and their set was "inspiring". Mentioning that anticipation was high for the duo's first ever UK performance, Ellwood-Hughes noted that their "packed" set drew "huge cheers from the arena crowd", citing Break First as an early highlight. He stated that the best parts of the set where when McGraw and Hill sang together, referring to their chemistry as "magical" and "off the charts as they trade glances, interact with one another and, at times, look at each other as if there is no one else in the room". Regarding the solo performances, he praised Hill's "energy and enthusiasm", citing This Kiss as a "one of the night's special moments" when Hill "became visibly choked up" as an international audience loudly sang along. Additionally, he called Hill's rendition of Breathe "stunning" and her Piece of My Heart cover a "powerhouse performance". Similarly, McGraw's "confident charisma" was praised and the moment where the audience burst into a spontaneous singalong of Humble and Kind which left McGraw visibly "overwhelmed" was picked as a highlight. Ellwood-Hughes called their performance of Speak to a Girl "beautiful and timely" and said that It's Your Love was a "perfect way to end the night and absolutely stunning". He was critical of sound issues that resulted in complaints from a large number of audience members who were unable to hear the artists because of loud bass reverb, causing many to leave midway through.

== Notable events ==
During the show in Dubin on March 11, 2018, McGraw collapsed following his performance of "Humble and Kind" and was carried offstage by members of his crew. After twenty minutes, Hill returned to the stage and announced that McGraw was doing fine but was suffering from dehydration and she had made the decision not to allow him back onstage. Hill and the band performed "What a Friend We Have in Jesus" as a final a capella song for the crowd before ending the show early. Although disheartened, the crowd applauded and began chanting "get well Tim". A statement from the couple stated that McGraw "was attended to by local medical staff on-site and will be fine" before adding that "he and Faith thank everyone for their love and support and look forward to seeing their Irish fans again soon".
