= Stealing Kisses =

Single by Faith Hill

from the album Fireflies
- Released: September 4, 2006
- Recorded: December 9, 2004
- Studio: Blackbird Studio (Nashville, TN); Essential Sound (Nashville, TN); Ocean Way Recording (Nashville, TN); Henson Recording Studios (Los Angeles, CA); Premium Recording (Austin, TX)
- Genre: Country
- Length: 4:23
- Label: Warner Bros. Nashville
- Songwriter: Lori McKenna
- Producers: Byron Gallimore; Faith Hill

Faith Hill singles chronology
"Sunshine and Summertime" (2006)	"Stealing Kisses" (2006)	"I Need You" (2007)

"Stealing Kisses" is a song recorded by American country music artist Faith Hill. The song was written and originally recorded by American country music singer Lori McKenna, first appearing on her album Bittertown (2004). It was released on September 4, 2006 by Warner Bros. Nashville as the fifth and final single from Hill's sixth studio album Fireflies (2005).

Receiving favorable reviews, "Stealing Kisses" was the least successful single from the album and the only one to not enter the top ten, instead peaking at number 36 on the Hot Country Songs chart. Despite failure at country radio, a music video was created which was directed by Sophie Muller; ironically enough, "Sunshine and Summertime" (a top ten hit from the album) never received a video.

== Chart performance ==
"Stealing Kisses" debuted on the Billboard Hot Country Songs the week of October 14, 2006, at number 58, the second highest debut of the week but the lowest debut for a single from Fireflies. The next week, the song rose up to number 48. The song entered the top forty the week of November 25, 2006, at number 39. A week later on December 2, "Stealing Kisses" reached its peak of number 36; the song would spend a total of twenty weeks. It became the only single from Fireflies to not enter the top ten of the chart, with all of the other singles ("Mississippi Girl", "Like We Never Loved at All", "The Lucky One", and "Sunshine and Summertime") reaching peak positions of numbers one, five, five, and seven respectively.

The song also had very minor success in Canada, debuting on the Canada Country chart the week of December 2, 2006. The song reached its peak of number 44 the next week and only spend three weeks in the country.

== Critical reception ==
Kevin John Coyne of Country Universe reviewed the song favorably. He wrote that "Hill infuses Lori McKenna’s saga of a slowly sinking housewife with a bittersweet Wynette-worthy vocal."

== Personnel ==
From Fireflies liner notes.

- Tom Bukovac - electric guitar
- Dan Dugmore - Dobro
- Stuart Duncan - mandolin
- Shannon Forrest - drums
- Byron Gallimore - keyboard, organ
- Jimmy Nichols - piano
- Bryan Sutton - acoustic guitar
- Kelly Willis - background vocals
- Glenn Worf - bass guitar

== Chart performance ==
Chart (2006)	Peak position
Canada Country (Billboard)	44
US Hot Country Songs (Billboard)	36
