= French Quarter Moon =

Studio album by Evangeline
- Released: November 23, 1993
- Genre: Country
- Length: 41:48
- Label: Margaritaville/MCA
- Producer: Justin Niebank & Michael Utley

Evangeline chronology
Evangeline (1992)	French Quarter Moon (1993)	Louisiana Aye Yi Yi (1996)

Singles from French Quarter Moon
- 1. "I'm Still Loving You" Released: October 1993; 2. "Let's Go Spend Your Money Honey" Released: January 1994

Professional ratings
Review scores
Source	Rating
Allmusic	4.5/5 stars

French Quarter Moon is the second album by New Orleans–based band Evangeline for Margaritaville Records, an MCA Records subsidiary owned by Jimmy Buffett. The lineup for this album is Sharon Leger, Rhonda Bolin Lohmeyer, Beth McKee and Kathleen Steiffel.

== Track listing ==
No.	Title	Writer(s)	Length
1.	"She's a Wild One"	Will Rambeaux; Pat Bunch; Jaime Kyle	3:09
2.	"I'm Still Loving You"	Stephen Allen Davis	4:26
3.	"On the Levee"	Rhonda Bolin Lohmeyer	4:31
4.	"Let's Go Spend Your Money Honey"	Kelly Willis; Costas	3:13
5.	"French Quarter Moon"	Tony Haselden	3:56
6.	"One More Day"	Sharon Leger; Joe Tullos	4:09
7.	"We Will Fly"	Jennifer Ferguson	3:40
8.	"Delta Run"	Rhonda Bolin Lohmeyer; Beth McKee	4:19
9.	"Elvis Of The Night"	Beth McKee	3:51
10.	"Don't Cross That Bridge"	Beth McKee	3:38
11.	"Let's Begin With Goodbye"	Rhonda Bolin Lohmeyer; Beth McKee; Kathleen Stieffel	2:52
12.	"Untitled Hidden Track"		0:04
Total length:			41:48

== Musicians ==
- Sharon Leger: Vocals, bass, washboard
- Rhonda Bolin Lohmeyer: Vocals, electric guitar, acoustic guitar
- Beth McKee: Vocals, keyboards, accordion
- Kathleen Steiffel: Vocals, acoustic guitar
- Eddie Bayers: Drums
- Billy Panda: Electric guitar, acoustic guitar, National guitar, mandolin
- Justin Niebank: Keyboards, percussion
- Michael Utley: Organ, keyboards
- Stuart Duncan: Violin

== Production ==
- Producer: Justin Niebank, Michael Utley
- Production Coordination: Ragena Warden, Shellie Erwin
- Photography: Beverly Parker
- Art Direction: Virginia Team
- Design: Jerry Joyner
- Creative Director: Jim Kemp (MCA Records/Nashville), Shellie Erwin (Margaritaville Records)

All track information and credits were taken from the CD liner notes.
