= 2003 CMT Flameworthy Awards =

Annual US country music awards ceremony

- Date: April 7, 2003
- Location: Gaylord Entertainment Center, Nashville, Tennessee
- Hosted by: Pamela Anderson; Toby Keith
- Most awards: Toby Keith (2); Martina McBride (2); Tim McGraw (2)
- Most nominations: Faith Hill (5); Toby Keith (5)

Television/radio coverage
- Network: CMT

The 2003 CMT Flameworthy Awards (now known as the CMT Music Awards) aired on April 7, 2003, from the Gaylord Entertainment Center (now known as the Bridgestone Arena) in Nashville, Tennessee, and hosted by Pamela Anderson and Toby Keith. The CMT Flameworthy Awards are a fan-voted awards show for country music videos and live performances. Keith, Martina McBride, and Tim McGraw were the biggest winners, with each of the three taking home two awards, while Keith and Faith Hill were the most nominated artists with each garnering five nominations.

== Winners and nominees ==
Winners are shown in bold.(nominees styled with "Flameworthy" before each title)

Video of the Year	Female Video of the Year
**Toby Keith** — "**Courtesy of the Red, White and Blue (The Angry American)**"; Faith Hill — "Cry"; Tim McGraw — "She's My Kind of Rain"; Kenny Chesney — "The Good Stuff"; Rascal Flatts — "These Days "	**Martina McBride** — "**Concrete Angel**"; Terri Clark — "I Just Wanna Be Mad"; Faith Hill — "Cry"; Shania Twain — "I'm Gonna Getcha Good!"; Rebecca Lynn Howard — "Forgive"
Male Video of the Year	Group/Duo Video of the Year
**Kenny Chesney** — "**The Good Stuff**"; Alan Jackson — "Drive (For Daddy Gene)"; Toby Keith — "Courtesy of the Red, White and Blue (The Angry American)"; Tim McGraw — "She's My Kind of Rain"; Kid Rock ft. Sheryl Crow — "Picture"	**Rascal Flatts** — "**These Days**"; The Chicks — "Long Time Gone"; Diamond Rio — "Beautiful Mess"; Trick Pony — "Just What I Do"; Montgomery Gentry — "My Town"
Breakthrough Video of the Year	Video Director of the Year
**Joe Nichols** — "**Brokenheartsville**"; Steve Azar — "Waitin' on Joe"; Blake Shelton — "Ol' Red"; Emerson Drive — "Fall into Me"; Jennifer Hanson — "Beautiful Goodbye"	**Deaton-Flanigen Productions** — "**Martina McBride - Concrete Angel**"; Peter Zavadil — "Blake Shelton - Ol' Red"; Steven Goldmann — "Steve Azar - Waitin' on Joe"; Trey Fanjoy — "Keith Urban - Somebody Like You"; Mike Lipscombe — "Faith Hill - Cry"
Concept Video of the Year	Hottest Male Video of the Year
**Shania Twain** — "**I'm Gonna Getcha Good!**"; Vince Gill — "Next Big Thing"; Toby Keith — "Who's Your Daddy?"; Cledus T. Judd — "It's a Great Day To Be a Guy"; Martina McBride — "Concrete Angel"	**Tim McGraw** — "**She's My Kind of Rain**"; Keith Urban — "Raining on Sunday"; Toby Keith — "Who's Your Daddy?"; Kenny Chesney — "Big Star"; Rascal Flatts — "These Days"
Hottest Female Video of the Year	Cocky Video of the Year
**Faith Hill** — "**When the Lights Go Down**"; Deana Carter — "There's No Limit"; The Chicks — "Long Time Gone"; LeAnn Rimes — "Life Goes On"; Shania Twain — "I'm Gonna Getcha Good!"	**Toby Keith** — "**Courtesy of the Red, White and Blue (The Angry American)**"; Chris Cagle — "Country by the Grace of God"; Trace Adkins — "Chrome"; Montgomery Gentry — "My Town"; Terri Clark — "I Just Wanna Be Mad"
Fashion Plate Video of the Year	Special Achievement Award
**Tim McGraw** — "**She's My Kind of Rain**"; Keith Urban — "Somebody Like You"; The Chicks — "Long Time Gone"; Shania Twain — "I'm Gonna Getcha Good!"; Faith Hill — "When the Lights Go Down"	**Johnny Cash**

== Performances ==
Performer(s)	Song(s)
Tim McGraw	"Real Good Man"
Rascal Flatts	"Love You Out Loud"
Alan Jackson	"When Love Comes Around"
Darryl Worley	"Have You Forgotten?"
Shania Twain with Alison Krauss & Union Station	"Forever and for Always"
Kenny Chesney	"No Shoes, No Shirt, No Problems"
Kid Rock and Sheryl Crow	"Picture"
Faith Hill	"You're Still Here"
Toby Keith	"Courtesy of the Red, White and Blue (The Angry American)"

== Presenters ==
- Glen Campbell, introduced Tim McGraw and lit the flame of the awards
- Pamela Anderson and Toby Keith perform a monologue
- Chris Cagle and Jimmy Johnson presented Breakthrough Video of the Year
- Kevin Carter and Brooke Burke presented Hottest Male & Hottest Female Video of the Year
- Mo Rocca and Terri Clark presented Fashion Plate Video of the Year
- Trace Adkins presented Concept Video of the Year
- Brett Butler presented Cocky Video of the Year
- Jessica Andrews and Wilmer Valderrama presented Video Director of the Year
- Keith Urban presented Female Video of the Year
- Deana Carter and Steve Azar presented Group/Duo Video of the Year
- Vince Gill presented the Special Achievement Award and memorialized Johnny Cash
- Martina McBride presented Male Video of the Year
- Hank Williams Jr. presented Video of the Year
