= When the Lights Go Down (Faith Hill song) =

2002 single by Faith Hill

Single by Faith Hill

from the album Cry
- B-side: "Stronger" (live); "If You're Gonna Fly Away"
- Released: November 19, 2002
- Studio: Emerald Entertainment, The Sound Kitchen (Nashville, Tennessee); The Hit Factory (New York City)
- Genre: Country pop
- Length: 4:06
- Label: Warner Bros. Nashville
- Songwriters: Craig Wiseman, Jeffrey Steele, Rivers Rutherford
- Producers: Faith Hill, Dann Huff

Faith Hill singles chronology
"Cry" (2002)	"When the Lights Go Down" (2002)	"One" (2003)

"When the Lights Go Down" is a song written by Craig Wiseman, Jeffrey Steele, and Rivers Rutherford, recorded by American country pop singer Faith Hill. It was released to country radio November 19, 2002, as the second single from her fifth studio album, Cry (2002). The second of three songs from the album promoted to country radio, "When the Lights Go Down" peaked at number 26 on the Billboard Hot Country Songs chart in 2003. At the time, this was Hill's lowest position on the chart since "But I Will" peaked at number 35 in 1994.

The song inspired the name of Hill's NBC concert special (taped in September 2002 and aired in November of that year), as well as her live DVD featuring performances from the same, released May 6, 2003. A Europe-exclusive CD single, released in February 2003, also contains a live version of "Stronger" taken from this concert.

== Composition ==
"When the Lights Go Down" is a midtempo country pop-styled power ballad with a duration of four minutes and six seconds (4:06). It was written by Craig Wiseman, Jeffrey Steele, and Rivers Rutherford and was produced by Faith Hill and Dann Huff. According to the digital sheet music published on Musicnotes.com through Universal Music Publishing Group, it was originally composed and recorded in the key of F♯ major (published in the key of G major) and set in simple time (4/4) to a "moderately slow" tempo of 72 BPM. Hill's vocals range from G_{3}–E_{5}.

== Commercial performance ==
"When the Lights Go Down" debuted on the Billboard Hot Country Songs chart the week of November 23, 2002 at number 53, the highest debut of the week. It rose to number 45 the next week. The song rose to its peak position of number 26 in its fourteenth week on February 22, 2003; "When the Lights Go Down" spent 20 weeks in total. The song (not counting her 2000 Christmas single "Where Are You Christmas?") became her first single since "But I Will" from her debut studio album Take Me as I Am (1993) to not peak within the top 20 of the country chart. The song also became a minor hit on the Bubbling Under Hot 100, debuting and peaking at number 19 the week of February 1, 2003 and spending six weeks on the chart.

"When the Lights Go Down" became a minor hit in German-speaking Europe. The song debuted and peaked at number 64 on the Official German Singles chart on February 10, 2003, spending four weeks in total. The song was Hill's fourth and most recent entry on the German chart following "This Kiss", "There You'll Be", and "Cry".

== Music video ==
The video for "When the Lights Go Down" was directed by Gary Halvorson. It won the award for Hottest Female Video of the Year at the 2003 CMT Flameworthy Music Video Awards.

== Track listing ==
German CD single

1. "When the Lights Go Down" – 4:06
2. "Stronger" (live) – 4:28
3. "If You're Gonna Fly Away" – 3:48

== Credits and personnel ==
Credits are lifted from the Cry album booklet.

Studios

- Recorded at Emerald Entertainment, The Sound Kitchen (Nashville, Tennessee) and The Hit Factory (New York City)
- Strings recorded at Ocean Way Recording (Los Angeles)
- Mixed at South Beach Studios (Miami, Florida)
- Mastered at The Mastering Lab (Hollywood, California)

Main personnel

- Craig Wiseman – writing
- Jeffrey Steele – writing
- Rivers Rutherford – writing
- Faith Hill – vocals, production
- Chris Rodriguez – background vocals
- Lisa Cochran – background vocals
- Bekka Bramlett – background vocals
- Jerry McPherson – guitar
- Dann Huff – guitar, production
- Jimmie Lee Sloas – bass
- Matt Rollings – piano
- Tim Akers – keyboards
- Vinnie Colaiuta – drums
- Eric Darken – percussion
- Jeff Balding – recording
- Pat Woodward – recording assistance
- Matt Snedecor – recording assistance
- Mark Hagen – additional recording
- Allen Ditto – additional recording
- Jon Balding – additional recording assistance
- Dino Herrmann – Pro Tools engineering
- Tom Lord-Alge – mixing
- Femio Hernandez – mixing assistance
- Doug Sax – mastering
- Robert Hadley – mastering

Orchestra

- Suzie Katayama – conducting, orchestra management
- Joel Derouin – violin
- Charlie Bisharat – violin
- Eve Butler – violin
- Darius Campo – violin
- Susan Chatman – violin
- Mario Deleon – violin
- Armen Garabedian – violin
- Sara Parkins – violin
- Bob Peterson – violin
- Michele Richards – violin
- Mark Robertson – violin
- John Wittenberg – violin
- John Hayhurst – viola
- Denyse Buffum – viola
- Matt Funes – viola
- Karie Prescott – viola
- Larry Corbett – cello
- Steve Richards – cello
- Rudy Stein – cello
- Miguel Martinez – cello
- David Campbell – arrangement
- Steve Churchyard – recording
- Greg Burns – recording assistant

== Charts ==
Chart (2002–2003)	Peak position
Austria (Ö3 Austria Top 40)	52
Germany (GfK)	64
US Bubbling Under Hot 100 (Billboard)	19
US Hot Country Songs (Billboard)	26

== Release history ==
Region	Date	Format	Ref.
United States	November 19, 2002	Country radio	
Germany	January 27, 2003	CD	
