= Cry (Faith Hill album) =

Studio album by Faith Hill
- Released: October 15, 2002
- Recorded: Late 2001–2002
- Studio: Skywalker Sound (Lucas Valley, California); Rumbo (Canoga Park, California); Ocean Way (Hollywood, California); Henson (Hollywood, California); Capitol (Hollywood, California); Essential Sound (Houston, Texas); Profound Sound (Fenton, Missouri); Emerald Sound (Nashville, Tennessee); Ocean Way (Nashville, Tennessee); Sound Kitchen (Franklin, Tennessee); Hit Factory (New York, New York); The Attic
- Genre: Pop; country; R&B; rock
- Length: 60:30
- Label: Warner Bros. Nashville
- Producer: Faith Hill; Marti Frederiksen; Byron Gallimore; Dann Huff

Faith Hill chronology
There You'll Be (2001)	Cry (2002)	Fireflies (2005)

Singles from Cry
- 1. "Cry" Released: August 8, 2002; 2. "When the Lights Go Down" Released: November 18, 2002; 3. "Baby You Belong" Released: December 20, 2002; 4. "One" Released: April 7, 2003; 5. "You're Still Here" Released: April 28, 2003

Cry is the fifth studio album by American country music singer Faith Hill. It was released on October 15, 2002, via Warner Bros. Nashville. The album was Hill's attempt at expanding her crossover appeal that she had garnered with hits like "Breathe" and "The Way You Love Me". Hill co-produced the album along with Marti Frederiksen, Byron Gallimore, and Dann Huff.

Upon its release, Cry received mixed reviews from music critics, with Hill's decision to focus on pop and R&B influences while largely abandoning the country sound of her previous album being divided over. Despite this, the album went on break a record for the highest first week sales by a female country artist, debuting atop both the Billboard 200 and Top Country Albums chart with first week sales of 467,000 copies sold in its first week. It would go on to sell four million copies worldwide and was certified 2× Platinum by the RIAA, a moderate success compared to her previous album Breathe (1999), which was certified 8× Platinum.

Five singles in total were released. The title track, "Cry", was released in August 2002 and despite debuting at number 32 on the US Hot Country Songs, it only peaked at number 12, marking her lowest-peaking lead single to the format. Country radio was hesitant to play songs from the album and as such, follow-up singles released like "When the Lights Go Down" and "You're Still Here" failed to be successful. "One" was exclusively released to the adult contemporary format while "Baby You Belong" was released exclusively to Japan to promote the 2002 Disney film Lilo & Stitch. The album was negatively reviewed at country radio, with many programmers claiming Hill had "abandoned" the genre. Hill was heavily compared to Celine Dion in terms of the move of genres, which was also negatively reviewed.

At the Grammy Awards, the album received two nominations: Best Country Album and Best Female Country Vocal Performance for the title track, winning the latter award. Cry would later be ranked at number 179 on Billboard's Top 200 album of the 2000s decade. In a retrospective interview from 2005 while promoting her following album Fireflies (2005), Hill told Billboard that "it was definitely a different record," but that she is still "so proud of [the album]." The album, along with works by fellow female artists LeAnn Rimes (Twisted Angel), Shania Twain (Up!), and Lee Ann Womack (Something Worth Leaving Behind), were seen as albums that struggled the most at country radio due to how they tried to appeal to both pop and country, but failed to have major success in either genre. Hill, in particular, was questioned if she was "selling out".

== Background ==
In 1999, Hill released her fourth studio album Breathe (1999). Commercially, the album was very successful, debuting atop both the Billboard 200 and Top Country Albums charts. It spawned crossover hits such as "Breathe", which satisfied both pop and country audiences, and "The Way You Love Me", with the former becoming the number-one song on the Billboard Hot 100 Year-End list for 2000. This success was what led her to win the Favorite Pop/Rock Female Artist award at the 2000 American Music Awards. She also garnered a hit song from the 2001 Michael Bay-directed film Pearl Harbor, "There You'll Be", which became her most successful song in Europe. This success swayed Hill to make a more pop-friendly album. While she still stuck with her previous producers Byron Gallimore and Dann Huff, she also brought in Marti Frederiksen, who is most well-known for his work with Aerosmith, to produce the title track. With this record, Hill dived into genres such as gospel and R&B.

== Songs ==
The album opens up with the song "Free"; lyrically, Hill recalls having a "poor self-image as a child, and developing confidence thanks to faith and angelic comfort." The title track, "Cry", was to initially have featured Steven Tyler of Aerosmith. On "Cry", Hill sings about wishing a partner to display emotion after a breakup. The Pink and Linda Perry penned song "If You're Gonna Fly Away" shows Hill singing about offering encouragement and prayer support; Hill's vocals in this song were compared to girl group En Vogue. "I Think I Will" and "Stronger" both show Hill singing about the recognition of inner strength; on the former song, she also sings about "wanting to make the world a better place". "Unsaveable" has a unique Motown-inspired groove. "This Is Me", a song that has influences of country rock, has a similar distinct sound to Jessica Andrews' 2001 hit song "Who I Am" most likely due to both the songs sharing the same writer, Troy Verges. On the song "One", she takes inspiration from Barbra Streisand; lyrically, it speaks of longing to restore intimacy in a "too-busy" relationship. "Baby You Belong" lyrically points to either a romantic relationship or a mother-child relationship due to its vagueness. The closing track, "You're Still Here" is a heartbreak song where Hill delivers the words with "a crackle in her voice."; it is about a departed loved one that Hill feels nearby.

== Singles ==
"Cry", the title track, was first issued on August 8, 2002 as a digital download to country radio. It was officially released to the format on August 19, 2002, as the lead single to the album. It debuted at number 32 on the US Hot Country Songs chart with less than four days of airplay, becoming Hill's then-highest debut and the highest debuting single of the year; the record was broken when Shania Twain debuted at number 24 with "I'm Gonna Getcha Good!". Despite a strong debut, it only peaked at number 12 on September 21, 2002. This, in turn, became her first lead single to miss the top ten; her previous lowest peaking lead single was with "Let's Go to Vegas" for It Matters to Me (1995), which peaked at number five on the October 21, 1995 issue. However, "Cry" proved to have much more success in the adult contemporary market, peaking atop the Adult Contemporary chart for 11 consecutive weeks. Internationally, the song peaked at number three in Canada while reaching the top twenty in Hungary, New Zealand, Spain, Norway, and Romania. The Mike Lipscombe-directed music video would garner Hill two nominations at the 2003 CMT Flameworthy Awards for Video of the Year and Female Video of the Year.

The second single, "When the Lights Go Down", was released on November 18, 2002, as the second single to the album. It debuted at number 53 the week of November 23, 2002, thanks in part to a performance at the 2002 CMA Awards. It peaked at number 26 on the Hot Country Songs chart, becoming Hill's first single since "But I Will" back in 1994 to miss the top-twenty of the chart. Exclusively released to German speaking Europe, it peaked at numbers 52 and 64 in Austria and Germany. The video would win the award for Hottest Female Video of the Year at the 2003 CMT Flameworthy Awards.

"Baby You Belong" was exclusively released to Japan on March 8, 2003. It was released in the country to promote the 2002 Disney film Lilo & Stitch; the song was included in the Japanese version's soundtrack. It failed to enter the charts there.

The fourth single, "One", was exclusively released to US adult and hot adult contemporary radio on April 7, 2003. The song performed moderately well, peaking at number seven on the Adult Contemporary chart. It also briefly charted at number 38 on the Adult Top 40 chart.

"You're Still Here" was released on April 28, 2003, as the fifth and final song from the record. It peaked at number 28 on the Hot Country Songs chart.

== Critical reception ==
Professional ratings
Aggregate scores
Source	Rating
Metacritic	59/100
Review scores
Source	Rating
AllMusic	3/5 stars
Billboard	average
Blender	4/5 stars
E! Online	B+
Entertainment Weekly	B
Los Angeles Times	1.5/4 stars
Mojo	1.5/5 stars
Q	3/5 stars
Rolling Stone	2/5 stars
The Village Voice	C

Cry received mixed reviews from music critics. At Metacritic, which assigns a normalized rating out of 100 to reviews from mainstream critics, the album received an average score of 59, based on 8 reviews. Chris Willman of Entertainment Weekly praised Hill for taking stylistic risks but conceded that the album "invites some of the criticism that will inevitably come its way." Billboard wrote that "Cry is a confident effort, with Hill laying claim as queen of" pop-country, however the magazine also described the songs as "sometimes bland" and "repetitive." AllMusic writer Robert L. Doerschuk was ambivalent towards the album's production, writing that "her established skills as a song interpreter are lost in all this sturm und drang and her voice, while undeniably powerful at its peak, doesn't have the range that allows most singers in this style... to at least milk the material."

Rolling Stone found the album to be "contrived" and impersonal, with Barry Walters writing, "[Hill is] an expert in the yelps and sighs that signify pop passion, and what she lacks in personality she makes up for with power, professionalism and unfailing hooks." Robert Hillburn of the Los Angeles Times was particularly critical, rating the album one-and-a-half stars out of four. "The songs ... are mediocre," he writes, "her vocals are rarely convincing, and the arrangements are ham-fisted."

In a piece commemorating Cry's tenth anniversary, Billy Dukes of Taste of Country theorized that most of the polarizing opinions on the album were a result of the "building tension" at the time between country "purists" and listeners who liked Hill's contemporary pop influences.

== Commercial performance ==
Cry debuted at number one on both the Billboard Top Country Albums chart and the all-genre Billboard 200 chart dated November 2, 2002. The album sold over 472,000 copies in its first week, marking the highest first week sales of Hill's career and also setting a new record for the largest first-week sales figure by a solo female country artist since Nielsen SoundScan began tracking sales in 1991; the record was later broken just a few weeks later when fellow country singer Shania Twain would debuted at number one with over 874,000 copies sold first week for her 2002 album Up!. It would only spend one week at number one on the Billboard 200 and only spent 39 weeks total, Hill's second shortest chart run with a solo album. On the country charts, it would spend three non-consecutive weeks at number one and overall 63 weeks on the chart to date; Cry is one of only two of Hill's solo albums to not spend at least 100 weeks on the country charts.

== Track listing ==
Cry track listing
No.	Title	Writer(s)	Producer(s)	Length
1.	"Free"	Annie Roboff; Beth Nielsen Chapman	Byron Gallimore; Faith Hill	4:38
2.	"Cry"	Angie Aparo	Marti Frederiksen; Hill	3:45
3.	"One"	Roboff; Bekka Bramlett; Billy Burnette	Gallimore; Hill	5:20
4.	"When the Lights Go Down"	Rivers Rutherford; Jeffrey Steele; Craig Wiseman	Dann Huff; Hill	4:05
5.	"Beautiful"	Chris Lindsey; Aimee Mayo; Shaye Smith	Gallimore; Hill	4:41
6.	"Unsaveable"	Bramlett; Bobby Terry	Huff; Hill	3:51
7.	"Baby You Belong"	Keith Follesé; Wade Kirby; Bill Luther	Huff; Hill	4:08
8.	"If You're Gonna Fly Away"	Alecia Moore; Linda Perry	Gallimore; Hill	3:48
9.	"Stronger"	Hillary Lindsey; Troy Verges	Gallimore; Hill	4:13
10.	"If This Is the End"	Steve McEwan	Gallimore; Hill	4:55
11.	"This Is Me"	Lindsey; Verges	Gallimore; Hill	5:04
12.	"Back to You"	Derek Bramble; Lindy Robbins	Huff; Hill	4:35
13.	"I Think I Will"	Steve Robson; Anthony Smith	Huff; Hill	4:08
14.	"You're Still Here"	Matraca Berg; Mayo	Gallimore; Hill	3:19
Total length:				60:30

Japanese edition bonus track
No.	Title	Writer(s)	Producer(s)	Length
15.	"Wicked"	McEwan	Gallimore; Hill	4:04
Total length:				64:34

== Personnel ==
Performance credits

- Faith Hill – vocals
- Greg Barnhill – background vocals
- Bekka Bramlett – background vocals
- Lisa Cochran – background vocals
- Marti Frederiksen – background vocals
- Lisa Gregg – background vocals
- Chris Rodriguez – background vocals
- Edmund Stein – vocals
- Crystal Taliefero – background vocals

Music credits

- Tim Akers – keyboard
- Rick Baptist – trumpet
- Bob Becker – viola
- Charlie Bisharat – violin
- Bekka Bramlett – tambourine
- Denyse Buffum – viola
- Paul Bushnell – bass
- Eve Butler – violin
- David Campbell – arranger, conductor
- Darius Campo – violin
- Matt Chamberlain – drums
- Susan Chatman – violin
- Jeff Cobble – lead guitar
- Vinnie Colaiuta – drums, tambourine
- Larry Corbett – cello
- Jim Cox – piano, Hammond organ
- Eric Darken – percussion
- Mario deLeon – violin
- Joel Derouin – violin, concert master
- Erika Duke – cello
- Bruce Dukov – violin
- Earl Dumler – oboe
- Stephen Erdody – cello
- Stefanie Fife – cello
- Marti Frederiksen – acoustic guitar, percussion, electric guitar
- John Fumo – trumpet
- Matt Funes – viola
- Byron Gallimore – electric guitar, clavinet, sampling, slide guitar, drum loop, sampled keyboards, synthesizer accordion
- Armen Garabedian – violin
- Berj Garabedian – violin
- Endre Granat – violin
- Lynn Grants – viola
- Maurice Grants – cello
- John Hayhurst – viola
- Dan Higgins – tenor saxophone
- Jim Hoke – autoharp
- Jim Horn – tenor saxophone
- Dann Huff – guitar
- Damon Johnson – acoustic guitar, electric guitar, slide guitar
- Suzie Katayama – cello, conductor, string conductor
- Peter Kent – violin
- Michael Landau – acoustic guitar, electric guitar
- Sam Levine – tenor saxophone
- Dane Little – cello
- Diane Little – cello
- Erik Lutkins – drum loop
- Michael Markman – violin
- Miguel Martinez – cello
- Robert Matsuda – violin
- Chris McHugh – drums
- Jerry McPherson – guitar
- Doug Moffett – baritone saxophone
- Jamie Muhoberac – organ, keyboard, Wurlitzer
- Carole Mukogawa – viola
- Steve Nathan – keyboard
- Maria Newman – violin
- Sid Page – violin
- Toss Panos – drums
- Sara Parkins – violin
- Dean Parks – acoustic guitar, gut-string guitar
- Joel Peskin – baritone saxophone
- Bob Peterson – violin
- Tim Pierce – acoustic guitar, electric guitar
- Kazi Pitelka – viola
- Karie Prescott – viola
- Bill Reichenbach Jr. – trombone
- Michele Richards – violin
- Steve Richards – cello
- Mark Robertson – violin
- Annie Roboff – drum loop
- Matt Rollings – piano
- Haim Shtrum – violin
- Leland Sklar – bass
- Jimmie Lee Sloas – bass
- Dan Smith – cello
- Rudy Stein – cello
- David Stenske – violin
- Michael Hart Thompson – guitar
- Mari Tsumura – violin
- Josephina Vergara – violin
- Evan Wilson – viola
- John Wittenberg – violin
- Margaret Wooten – violin
- Cynthia Wyatt – harp
- Jonathan Yudkin – mandolin, cello, bazouki

Production credits

- Producer: Faith Hill, Marti Frederiksen, Byron Gallimore, Dann Huff, David May
- Engineers: Jeff Balding, Jeremy Blair, Steve Churchyard, Ricky Cobble, Dennis Davis, Allen Ditto, Jason Gantt, Mark Hagen, Julian King, Erik Lutkins, Michael McCoy, Brian Paturalski
- Mixing: Serban Ghenea, Mick Guzauski, Tom Lord-Alge, Mark O'Donoughue, Tim Palmer, Andy Wallace
- Mixing assistant: Tim Roberts
- Remixing: Elliot Scheiner
- Mastering: Robert Hadley, Tom Lord-Alge, Bob Ludwig, Doug Sax
- A&R: Jeffrey Aldrich, Danny Kee
- Assistants: Jeff Balding, Tom Bender, Greg Burns, Eric Gallimore, Jed Hackett, Femio Hernández, Judy Kirschner, Brett Patrick, Dennis Rivadeneira, Tim Roberts, Jaime Sickora, Steve Sisco, Matt Snedecor, Dann Thompson, Alex Uychocde, Patrick Woodward, Mike Zinczenko
- Digital editing: Ricky Cobble, Dennis Davis, Marti Frederiksen, Jason Gantt, Erik Lutkins, Chris Rowe, Josh Wilbur
- Authoring: Spencer Chrislu, David Dieckmann
- Production coordination: Ann Callis, Mike "Frog" Griffith
- Drum programming: Vinnie Colaiuta, Frank Macek
- Keyboard programming: Eric Carter
- Programming: Dann Huff, David Lyndon Huff, Chris McHugh, Tedd Tjornhom
- Overdubs: Byron Gallimore
- Sequencing: Byron Gallimore
- String arrangements: Paul Buckmaster, David Campbell, Jim Cox
- Orchestra manager: Suzie Katayama

Visual and imagery

- Art administration: Sandra Westerman
- Graphic coordinator: Raena Winscott
- Librarian: David Horn
- Hair stylist: Serge Normant

== Charts ==
=== Weekly charts ===
Weekly chart performance for Cry by Faith Hill
Chart (2002)	Peak position
Australian Albums (ARIA)	10
Australian Country Albums (ARIA)	2
Austrian Albums (Ö3 Austria)	60
Canadian Albums (Billboard)	3
Danish Albums (Hitlisten)	26
European Top 100 Albums (Music & Media)	49
Italian Albums (FIMI)	46
New Zealand Albums (RMNZ)	16
Norwegian Albums (VG-lista)	15
Portuguese Albums (AFP)	24
Swedish Albums (Sverigetopplistan)	22
Swiss Albums (Schweizer Hitparade)	20
UK Albums (OCC)	29
UK Country Albums (OCC)	1
US Billboard 200	1
US Top Country Albums (Billboard)	1

=== Year end charts ===
Year-end chart performance for Cry by Faith Hill
Chart (2002)	Position
Australian Country Albums (ARIA)	11
Canadian Albums (Nielsen SoundScan)	37
Canadian Country Albums (Nielsen SoundScan)	6
US Billboard 200	61
US Country Albums (Billboard)	9
Worldwide Albums (IFPI)	27
Chart (2003)	Position
Australian Country Albums (ARIA)	15
US Billboard 200	36
US Country Albums (Billboard)	5

=== Decade end charts ===
Decade-end chart performance for Cry
Chart (2000–09)	Position
US Billboard 200	179

== Certifications and sales ==
Certifications and sales figures for Cry
Region	Certification	Certified units/sales
Australia (ARIA)	Gold	35,000^{^}
Canada (Music Canada)	Platinum	100,000^{^}
Japan (RIAJ)	Gold	100,000^{^}
Portugal (AFP)	Gold	20,000^{^}
United States (RIAA)	2× Platinum	2,000,000^{^}
^{^} Shipments figures based on certification alone.

== Awards ==
Grammy Awards

Year	Winner	Category
2002	"Cry"	Best Female Country Vocal Performance
