= You're Still Here (song) =

Single by Faith Hill

from the album Cry
- B-side: "Shadows"
- Released: April 28, 2003
- Studio: Emerald Sound Entertainment (Nashville, TN); Essential Sound (Nashville, TN); Capitol Studios (Los Angeles, CA); Ocean Way Recording (Nashville, TN)
- Genre: Country
- Length: 3:20
- Label: Warner Bros. Nashville
- Songwriter(s): Matraca Berg; Aimee Mayo
- Producer(s): Byron Gallimore; Faith Hill

Faith Hill singles chronology
| "One" (2003) | "You're Still Here" (2003) | "Mississippi Girl" (2005) |

"You're Still Here" is a song recorded by American country music artist Faith Hill. The song was released on April 28, 2003, as the fifth and final single from her fifth studio album Cry (2002) by Warner Bros. Nashville. The song was written by Matraca Berg and Aimee Mayo and produced by Hill and Byron Gallimore.

The song peaked at number 28 on the Hot Country Songs chart and number six on the Hot Country Singles Sales chart after a physical CD release.

== Music video ==
A music video was released, which was filmed by Matthew Rolston. It features Hill on a beach. The video uses the "country" remix that was made specifically for country radio. The video premiered on May 30, 2003 to CMT.

== Chart performance ==
"You're Still Here" debuted on the Billboard Hot Country Songs chart the week of May 10, 2003, at number 52. The song climbed and entered the top thirty of the chart the week of July 29, 2003, at number 28, where the song peaked. The song spent 16 weeks on the chart.

After being released as a CD single, "You're Still Here" debuted on the Hot Country Singles Sales chart the week of June 28, 2003, at number seven and peaked at number six the following week.

== Charts ==
| Chart (2003) | Peak position |
|---|---|
| US Hot Country Songs (Billboard) | 28 |
| US Hot Country Singles Sales (Billboard) | 6 |

== Release history ==
Release dates and format(s) for "You're Still Here"
| Region | Date | Format(s) | Label(s) | Ref. |
|---|---|---|---|---|
| United States | April 28, 2003 | Country radio | Warner Bros. Nashville | |
