= Sunshine and Summertime =

Single by Faith Hill

from the album Fireflies
- Released: June 12, 2006
- Recorded: November 11, 2004
- Studio: Blackbird Studio (Nashville, TN); Essential Sound (Nashville, TN); Ocean Way Recording (Nashville, TN); Henson Recording Studios (Los Angeles, CA); Premium Recording (Austin, TX)
- Genre: Country pop
- Length: 3:27
- Label: Warner Bros. Nashville
- Songwriters: John Rich; Kylie Sackley; Rodney Clawson
- Producers: Byron Gallimore; Faith Hill

Faith Hill singles chronology
| "The Lucky One" (2006) | "Sunshine and Summertime" (2006) | "Stealing Kisses" (2006) |

"Sunshine and Summertime" is a song recorded by American country music singer Faith Hill. The song was written by John Rich, Kylie Sackley, and Rodney Clawson and produced by Hill and Byron Gallimore. Warner Bros. Nashville released it on June 12, 2006, to country radio as the fourth single from Hill's sixth studio album Fireflies (2005).

In contemporary reviews for Fireflies, "Sunshine and Summertime" received mostly positive reviews, with some praising its "cheerful" production. The song peaked at number seven on the Hot Country Songs chart and spent a single week atop the Canada Country chart. Hill performed the song during her Soul2Soul II Tour, which she co-headlined with her husband Tim McGraw.

== Chart performance ==
"Sunshine and Summertime" debuted on the Billboard Hot Country Songs the week of June 17, 2006, at number 57. On September 2, 2006, "Sunshine and Summertime" peaked at number 7, staying there for two weeks; the song would stay twenty weeks on the chart.

The song debuted on the Billboard Hot 100 on July 29, 2006, at number 95. It peaked at number 70 the week of September 9, 2006. "Sunshine and Summertime" spent ten weeks on the chart.

== Personnel ==
Compiled from liner notes.

- Greg Barnhill — background vocals
- Bekka Bramlett — background vocals
- Tom Bukovac — electric guitar
- Paul Bushnell — bass guitar
- Dan Dugmore — banjo
- Stuart Duncan — mandolin
- Shannon Forrest — drums, percussion
- Paul Franklin — steel guitar
- Jimmy Nichols — keyboards
- Javier Solis — percussion
- Bryan Sutton — acoustic guitar

== Charts ==
| Chart (2006) | Peak position |
|---|---|
| Canada Country (Billboard) | 1 |
| US Hot Country Songs (Billboard) | 7 |
| US Billboard Hot 100 | 70 |

=== Year-end charts ===
| Chart (2006) | Position |
|---|---|
| US Country Songs (Billboard) | 44 |

== Release history ==
Release dates and format(s) for "Sunshine and Summertime"
| Region | Date | Format(s) | Label(s) | Ref. |
|---|---|---|---|---|
| United States | June 12, 2006 | Country radio | Warner Bros. Nashville | |
