= Evangeline (band) =

American country band

- Origin: New Orleans, Louisiana, U.S.
- Genre: Country
- Years active: 1988–1996
- Labels: Margaritaville/MCA, Renegade
- Past members: Nancy Buchan; Dudley Fruge; Sharon Leger; Rhonda Lohmeyer; Beth McKee; Kathleen Stieffel

Evangeline was an American country music band initially composed of Kathleen Stieffel (guitar, vocals), Sharon Leger (bass guitar, washboard, vocals), Beth McKee (keyboards, accordion, vocals), Rhonda Lohmeyer (lead guitar), Nancy Buchan (fiddle, mandolin), and Dudley Fruge (drums). They recorded two studio albums—a 1992 self-titled debut and 1994's French Quarter Moon—for Margaritaville Records, an MCA Records subsidiary owned by Jimmy Buffett.

== Biography ==
Evangeline was a New Orleans–based band composed, at its most popular point, of singer Kathleen Steiffel, bass guitarist/washboardist Sharon Leger, keyboardist/accordionist Beth McKee, lead guitarist Rhonda Lohmeyer, fiddler/mandolinist Nancy Buchan, and drummer Dudley Fruge. The band entered a talent competition called Jazz Search in 1988, followed by the Marlboro Talent Roundup and the True Value Country Music Showdown. They were eventually discovered by singer Jimmy Buffett, who signed them to Margaritaville Records, his personal subsidiary of MCA Records.

Evangeline released its self-titled debut album in 1992, under the executive production of Buffett. Although this album produced no chart singles in the US, "If I Had a Heart" peaked at No. 81 on the RPM Country Tracks charts in Canada. Fruge and Buchan left the group before the release of their second album, 1994's French Quarter Moon. This album produced their first US chart single in "Let's Go Spend Your Money Honey", a No. 70 on the Billboard country charts. Also included on this album was the song "She's a Wild One", which later became a Number One hit in 1994 for Faith Hill under the title "Wild One". A third album, Louisiana Aye Yi Yi, recorded in 1990 when Evangeline was composed of Rhonda Lohmeyer, Sharon Leger and Leslie Doyle, was issued in 1996. That final recording featured more Zydeco and Cajun songs than their first two albums, including tunes written by Rockin' Sidney (Sidney Simien), D. L. Menard, and several traditional Cajun songs.

== Discography ==
=== Albums ===
Title	Album details
Evangeline	Release date: May 19, 1992; Label: Margaritvaille/MCA
French Quarter Moon	Release date: November 23, 1993; Label: Margaritvaille/MCA
Louisiana Aye Yi Yi	Release date: July 16, 1996; Label: Renegade Records

=== Singles ===
Year	Single	Peak chart positions		Album
Year	Single	US Country	CAN Country	Album
1992	"Bayou Boy"	—	—	Evangeline
1992	"Am I a Fool"	—	—	Evangeline
1993	"If I Had a Heart"	—	81	Evangeline
1993	"I'm Still Loving You"	—	—	French Quarter Moon
1994	"Let's Go Spend Your Money Honey"	70	—	French Quarter Moon
"—" denotes releases that did not chart

=== Music videos ===
Year	Video	Director
1992	"Bayou Boy"	Jim Shea
1993	"Still Lovin' You"	Sara Nichols
1993	"Let's Go Spend Your Money Honey"	Jim Shea
