= The Lucky One (Faith Hill song) =

Single by Faith Hill

from the album Fireflies
- Released: February 13, 2006
- Recorded: April 3, 2004
- Studio: Blackbird Studio (Nashville, TN); Essential Sound (Nashville, TN); Ocean Way Recording (Nashville, TN); Henson Recording Studios (Los Angeles, CA); Premium Recording (Austin, TX)
- Genre: Country
- Length: 3:37
- Label: Warner Bros. Nashville
- Songwriters: Brad Warren; Brett Warren; Jay Joyce
- Producers: Byron Gallimore, Faith Hill

Faith Hill singles chronology
"Like We Never Loved at All" (2006)	"The Lucky One" (2006)	"Sunshine and Summertime" (2006)

"The Lucky One" is a song recorded by American country music singer Faith Hill. It was released on February 13, 2006, by Warner Bros. Nashville as the third single from her sixth studio album: Fireflies (2005). The song was written by the Warren Brothers and Jay Joyce, and produced by Hill and frequent collaborator Byron Gallimore. Lyrically, "The Lucky One" is about how even if Hill may not have luxuries or a good day, she is "the lucky one" because she has her partner by her side.

Receiving positive reception, "The Lucky One" peaked at number 5 on the Hot Country Songs chart in the US, and hit number 1 on the Radio & Records country music chart in Canada. Hill performed the song on both the Soul2Soul II Tour and the Soul2Soul: The World Tour, both of which she co-headlined with her husband Tim McGraw.

== Chart performance ==
"The Lucky One" debuted on the Billboard Hot Country Songs the week of February 25, 2006, at number 47, then peaked at number 5 on May 6. The song spent a total of twenty weeks on the chart. The song also reached the top spot at Canada Country, staying at number 1 for three weeks.

"The Lucky One" debuted on the all-genre Billboard Hot 100 on April 8, 2006, at number 93. In its fifth week, "The Lucky One" reached its peak position of number 69. Overall, the song would spend nine weeks on the Billboard Hot 100.

== Music video ==
"The Lucky One"'s music video shows Hill mainly performing with her band, singing on various stages, while also showing various clips of Hill laughing and talking backstage. It was directed by Chris Hicky.

== Personnel ==
Compiled from liner notes.

- Greg Barnhill — background vocals
- Tom Bukovac — acoustic and electric guitars
- Paul Bushnell — bass guitar
- Vinnie Colaiuta — drums
- Dan Dugmore — steel guitar
- Paul Franklin — steel guitar
- Byron Gallimore — electric guitar
- Kenny Greenberg — electric mandolin
- Aubrey Haynie — mandolin
- Jay Joyce — acoustic and electric guitars
- Gene Miller — background vocals
- Jimmy Nichols — organ
- Darrell Scott — acoustic guitar, Weissenborn
- Javier Solis — percussion
- Crystal Taliefero — background vocals
- Brett Warren — background vocals

== Charts ==
Chart (2006)	Peak position
Canada Country Top 30 (Radio & Records)	1
US Hot Country Songs (Billboard)	5
US Billboard Hot 100	69

=== Year-end charts ===
Chart (2006)	Position
US Country Songs (Billboard)	42

== Release history ==
Release dates and format(s) for "The Lucky One"
Region	Date	Format(s)	Label(s)	Ref.
United States	February 13, 2006	Country radio	Warner Bros. Nashville	
