= Mississippi Girl =

Single by Faith Hill

from the album Fireflies
- Released: May 16, 2005
- Recorded: July 31, 2004
- Genre: Country
- Length: 3:52
- Label: Warner Bros. Nashville
- Songwriters: John Rich; Adam Shoenfeld
- Producers: Faith Hill; Byron Gallimore; Dann Huff

Faith Hill singles chronology
| "You're Still Here" (2003) | "Mississippi Girl" (2005) | "Like We Never Loved at All" (2005) |

Music video
- "Mississippi Girl" on YouTube

"Mississippi Girl" is a song by the American country music recording artist Faith Hill, taken from her sixth studio album Fireflies (2005). The song was written by John Rich of the country duo Big & Rich, with co-writing credits including fellow MuzikMafia member Adam Shoenfeld. Hill produced the song with long-time collaborators Byron Gallimore and Dann Huff. It was officially released on May 16, 2005, via Warner Bros. Nashville as the lead single from the project and Hill's first single release since "You're Still Here" (2003).

It was positively commended by music critics, although some noted the similarity between the track and singer Jennifer Lopez's hit song "Jenny from the Block" (2002) in regards of the messaging. Nevertheless, it was a massive success. It topped the US Hot Country Songs chart for two consecutive weeks, becoming Hill's ninth and final number one single to date, and her first since "The Way You Love Me" (2000). Its success propelled its parent album to platinum status. The track would receive a nomination at the 48th Annual Grammy Awards in 2006 for Best Female Country Vocal Performance while Rich and Shoenfeld would receive the SESAC Country Song of the Year award. It was also noted as being the 500 millionth song downloaded from iTunes.

== Content ==
Written specifically for Hill by John Rich (of Big & Rich) and fellow MuzikMafia member Adam Shoenfeld, the uptempo tune was anticipated within the industry due to Hill's absence from music in years. It was meant to be Hill's "country comeback" following the underwhelming success of her previous album Cry (2002). The song lyrically sings about Hill claiming she has not forgotten her roots after becoming famous; the track also includes a reference to her role in the 2004 film The Stepford Wives.

== Critical reception ==
"Mississippi Girl" received mostly positive reviews from music critics. Chuck Taylor of Billboard magazine gave the track a positive review, saying the song "is as country as it comes and checks off every ingredient on the hit list." Carol Costello from CNN said that the song would do well due to her return to country. Sue Keogh of the BBC compared the track to "Jenny from the Block". Slant Magazine said the song had the "stench of desperation" about it, with "southern-fried production [meant to] ape shamelessly the things that the women who supplanted her at the top of Nashville's pecking order have been doing."

== Chart performance ==
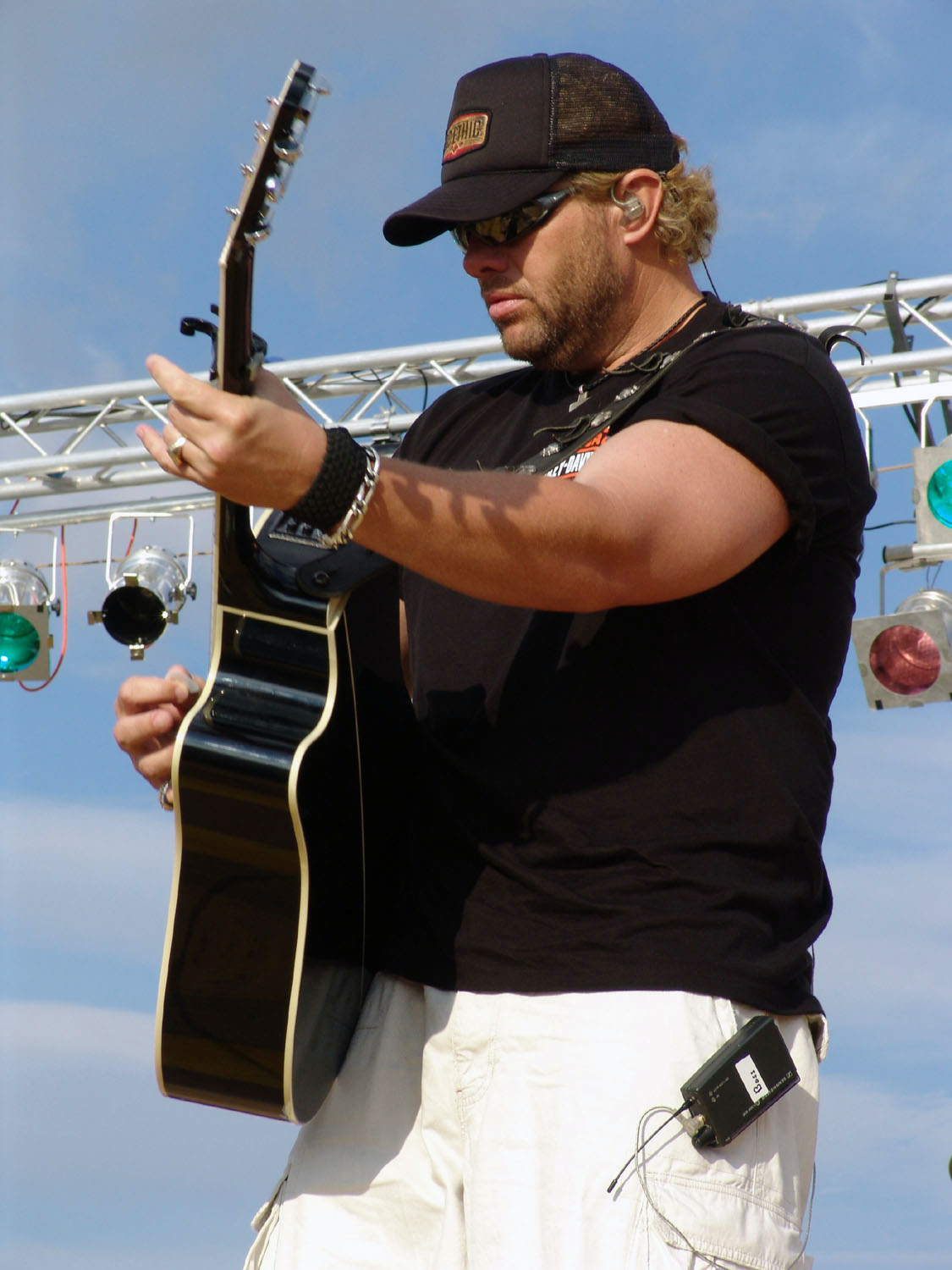
"Mississippi Girl" interrupted the six-week reign of Toby Keith's "As Good as I Once Was" at number one.

"Mississippi Girl" debuted at number 27 on the US Billboard Hot Country Songs chart on May 28, 2005, becoming Hill's all-time highest debut on the chart and the second highest debut by a female artist in the Nielsen SoundScan era behind Shania Twain, whom debuted at number 24 back in 2002 with "I'm Gonna Getcha Good!". On September 3, 2005, "Mississippi Girl" rose to the top spot with 34.1 million impressions, becoming Hill's ninth and final number one single to date and her first number one single since "The Way You Love Me" spent a 4-week reign at number one back in May 2000. It spent twenty weeks in total on the chart.

"Mississippi Girl" made its debut on the all-genre Billboard Hot 100 on June 11, 2005, at number 85, becoming both the second-highest debut of the week and Hill's first entry since "Cry" (2002). It reached its peak position of number 29 on August 27. "Mississippi Girl" overall spent twenty weeks on the chart. The track also topped the Radio & Records Canada Country Top 30 chart, spending three weeks at number one.

== Music video ==
The music video for "Mississippi Girl" was directed by Wayne Isham. It received a nomination at the 2006 CMT Music Awards for Female Video of the Year, losing to Carrie Underwood's "Jesus, Take the Wheel".

=== Synopsis ===
The video opens with Hill in a rural area near butterflies, which are CGI-animated, in a long white dress. It then shows her diving from a wooden bridge in the dress which then switches to Hill and her band performing the song in a concert (filmed in July 2005 at Rupp Arena in Lexington, Kentucky).

== Personnel ==
Compiled from liner notes.

- Bruce Bouton – steel guitar
- Bekka Bramlett – background vocals
- Tom Bukovac – electric guitar
- Paul Bushnell – bass guitar
- Perry Coleman – background vocals
- Eric Darken – percussion
- Dan Dugmore – steel guitar
- Dann Huff – electric guitar
- Tim Lauer – accordion
- Chris McHugh – drums
- Jimmy Nichols – keyboards
- Darrell Scott – mandolin

== Charts ==
=== Weekly charts ===
| Chart (2005) | Peak position |
|---|---|
| Canada Country Top 30 (Radio & Records) | 1 |
| US Billboard Hot 100 | 29 |
| US Hot Country Songs (Billboard) | 1 |
| US Billboard Pop 100 | 51 |

=== Year-end charts ===
| Chart (2005) | Position |
|---|---|
| Canada Country (Radio & Records) | 8 |
| US Billboard Hot 100 | 98 |
| US Hot Country Songs (Billboard) | 9 |
