= Take Me as I Am (Faith Hill album) =

Studio album by Faith Hill
- Released: October 12, 1993
- Recorded: July 1993
- Studio: Woodland (Nashville, Tennessee); Midtown Tone and Volume (Nashville, Tennessee); Sound Shop (Nashville, Tennessee)
- Genre: Country
- Length: 34:07
- Label: Warner Bros. Nashville
- Producer: Scott Hendricks; Michael Clute; Gary Burr

Faith Hill chronology
Take Me as I Am (1993)	It Matters to Me (1995)

Singles from Take Me as I Am
- 1. "Wild One" Released: September 23, 1993; 2. "Piece of My Heart" Released: January 13, 1994; 3. "But I Will" Released: May 16, 1994; 4. "Take Me as I Am" Released: September 12, 1994

Take Me as I Am is the debut studio album by American country music singer Faith Hill, released on October 12, 1993, by Warner Bros. Nashville. The album has been certified 3× platinum in the United States for shipments of three million copies.

Four singles were released from the album. The first two—"Wild One" and "Piece of My Heart"—reached No. 1 on the Billboard Hot Country Singles & Tracks chart in 1994. "Wild One," the tale of a rebellious teen-aged girl in conflict with her parents' more conservative ways, was the lead-off single, spending four weeks at No. 1 that January. "Piece of My Heart", a cover of the 1967 song by Erma Franklin, was issued as the follow-up. The third single, "But I Will", also charted, and the title track reached No. 2 in 1994.

== Critical reception ==
Professional ratings
Review scores
Source	Rating
AllMusic	4/5 stars
Entertainment Weekly	B+
Music Week	3/5 stars
Rolling Stone	(favorable)
The Rolling Stone Album Guide	2/5 stars
Select	2/5 medals

Larry Flick from Billboard stated that on "But I Will", "the power of her pliable, pure country voice has never been better showcased than on this heartfelt ballad about a woman who's had just about enough." Ian Nicolson from Music Week wrote, "Pushing Trisha Yearwood in the glamour and multi-format merchandise stakes, the debut release from this rich-voiced singer shows she has the pipes to back up the hype. The rock and roll-tinged US country number one single, 'Wild One', sets the tone, but the 'I've Got This Friend' duet with Larry Stewart will please traditionalists."

== Track listing ==
All tracks produced by Scott Hendricks; except "Just Around the Eyes" produced by Michael Clute and Gary Burr.

No.	Title	Writer(s)	Length
1.	"Take Me as I Am"	Bob DiPiero; Karen Staley	3:17
2.	"Wild One"	Pat Bunch; Jaime Kyle; Will Rambeaux	2:45
3.	"Just About Now"	Gary Burr; Jon Vezner	2:57
4.	"Piece of My Heart"	Bert Berns; Jerry Ragovoy	4:01
5.	"I've Got This Friend" (with Larry Stewart)	Faith Hill; Bruce Burch; Vern Dant	3:46
6.	"Life's Too Short to Love Like That"	Sandy Ramos	2:37
7.	"But I Will"	Troy Seals; Eddie Setser; Larry Stewart	3:47
8.	"Just Around the Eyes"	Burr	3:07
9.	"Go the Distance"	Trey Bruce; Thom McHugh; Hill	3:02
10.	"I Would Be Stronger Than That"	Burr	4:48
Total length:			34:07

== Personnel ==
As listed in liner notes.

=== All tracks except "Just Around the Eyes" ===
- Gary Burr – background vocals
- John Catchings – cello
- Bill Cuomo – synthesizer
- Stuart Duncan – mandolin, fiddle
- Paul Franklin – steel guitar, Dobro
- Dann Huff – electric guitar
- John Barlow Jarvis – piano
- Mary Ann Kennedy – background vocals
- Mark Luna – background vocals
- Brent Mason – electric guitar
- Terry McMillan – congas, cymbals, tambourine
- Don Potter – acoustic guitar
- Michael Rhodes – bass guitar
- Pam Rose – background vocals
- Victoria Shaw – background vocals
- Karen Staley – background vocals
- Larry Stewart – background vocals
- Cindy Richardson Walker – background vocals
- Ron Wallace – background vocals
- Lari White – background vocals
- Lonnie Wilson – drums

=== On "Just Around the Eyes" ===
- Gary Burr – background vocals
- Jerry Douglas – dobro
- Rob Hajacos – fiddle
- Terry McMillan – percussion
- Edgar Meyer – acoustic bass guitar
- Harry Stinson – drums
- Biff Watson – acoustic guitar
- Glenn Worf – electric bass guitar

== Production ==
- Producers: Scott Hendricks (all tracks except "Just Around the Eyes"); Mike Clute and Gary Burr ("Just Around the Eyes" only)
- Assistant producer: John Kunz
- Engineers: Mike Clute, John Kelton
- Assistant engineers: Jon "JD" Dickson, Amy Hughes, John Kunz, Shawn McLean, Wayne Morgan, Herb Tassin
- Mixing: Scott Hendricks
- Mastering: Denny Purcell
- Overdubs: Scott Hendricks, John Kunz
- Art direction: Laura LiPuma
- Design: Garrett Rittenberry
- Photography: Aaron Rapoport
- Make-up: Eric Bernard, Beth Katz

== Charts ==
=== Weekly charts ===
Chart (1993–1994)	Peak position
Canadian Albums (RPM)	51
Canadian Country Albums (RPM)	2
US Billboard 200	59
US Top Country Albums (Billboard)	7
US Heatseekers Albums (Billboard)	7

=== Year-end charts ===
Chart (1994)	Position
US Top Country Albums (Billboard)	23
Chart (1995)	Position
US Top Country Albums (Billboard)	40

== Certifications ==
Region	Certification	Certified units/sales
Canada (Music Canada)	3× Platinum	300,000^{^}
United States (RIAA)	3× Platinum	3,000,000^{^}
^{^} Shipments figures based on certification alone.
