= One (Faith Hill song) =

Single by Faith Hill

from the album Cry
- Released: April 7, 2003
- Studio: Essential Sound (Nashville, Tennessee); Henson (Hollywood, California)
- Genre: Pop soul
- Length: 5:20 (album version); 3:25 (radio edit)
- Label: Warner Bros. Nashville
- Songwriters: Annie Roboff; Bekka Bramlett; Billy Burnette
- Producers: Byron Gallimore; Faith Hill

Faith Hill singles chronology
"When the Lights Go Down" (2003)	"One" (2003)	"Baby You Belong" (2003)

"One" is a song by American country music artist Faith Hill, written by Annie Roboff, Bekka Bramlett, and Billy Burnette. It was released on April 7, 2003, as the third single from Hill's fifth studio album Cry (2002). It was exclusively released to adult contemporary and hot adult contemporary radio.

"One" peaked at number seven on the Adult Contemporary chart, while also peaking at number 39 on the Adult Top 40 chart.

== Critical reception ==
Billboard gave the song a mostly positive review, saying "It's an infectious little number, complete with a chorus of soul sisters echoing Hill's finger-waving lessons learned and a grinding guitar that conjures Queen." They did, however, question what format the song was suitable for, saying it was "too far left for AC, too far right for urban outlets, and off-center for her country base." They ended their review by saying, "You have to wonder how much longer programmers will keep the Faith."

== Charts ==
Chart (2003)	Peak position
US Adult Contemporary (Billboard)	7
US Adult Pop Airplay (Billboard)	39
US Bubbling Under Hot 100 (Billboard)	24

== Release history ==
Release dates and format(s) for "One"
Region	Date	Format	Label(s)	Ref.
United States	April 7, 2003	adult contemporary radio; hot adult contemporary radio	Warner Records	
