= Fireflies (Faith Hill album) =

Studio album by Faith Hill
- Released: August 2, 2005
- Recorded: March–November 2004
- Studio: Blackbird (Nashville, Tennessee); Capitol (Hollywood, California); Emerald Sound (Nashville, Tennessee); Essential Sound (Houston, Texas); Henson (Hollywood, California); Jane's Place (Nashville, Tennessee); Ocean Way (Nashville, Tennessee); Premium Recording (Austin, Texas); Starstruck (Nashville, Tennessee); The Castle (Nashville, Tennessee); Sound Kitchen (Franklin, Tennessee)
- Genre: Country
- Length: 54:36
- Label: Warner Bros. Nashville
- Producer: Faith Hill; Byron Gallimore; Dann Huff

Faith Hill chronology
Cry (2002)	Fireflies (2005)	The Hits (2007)

Singles from Fireflies
- 1. "Mississippi Girl" Released: May 16, 2005; 2. "Like We Never Loved at All" Released: August 1, 2005; 3. "The Lucky One" Released: February 13, 2006; 4. "Sunshine and Summertime" Released: June 12, 2006; 5. "Stealing Kisses" Released: October 14, 2006

Fireflies is the sixth studio album by American country music singer Faith Hill. The album was released on August 2, 2005, via Warner Bros. Records Nashville. Her first album since her 2002 crossover album Cry, Fireflies marked a return to traditional country music for Hill. Hill co-produced the album with Byron Gallimore and Dann Huff. Husband Tim McGraw is featured on the single "Like We Never Loved at All".

Five singles in total were released from the album. The lead single, "Mississippi Girl", marked Hill's ninth and most recent country number one hit and her first since 2000's "The Way You Love Me"'; it spent two weeks atop the Hot Country Songs chart. Follow-up singles "Like We Never Loved at All", "The Lucky One", and "Sunshine and Summertime" (which was her last solo top ten hit at country radio) all peaked within the top ten, with the first two peaking within the top five. "Stealing Kisses" was also a top 40 hit.

In its first week, Fireflies debuted atop both the all-genre Billboard 200 and Top Country Albums, selling 329,000 copies. Fireflies marked Hill's third consecutive album to top both of the charts simultaneously after 1999's Breathe and 2002's Cry. The album has been certified two times platinum by the RIAA for selling two million copies. Despite the commercial success, it was met with mixed reviews with many complaining that the album was bland. "Like We Never Loved at All" won the Grammy for Best Country Collaboration at the 48th Grammy Awards in 2006 while "Mississippi Girl" and Fireflies were nominated for Best Female Country Vocal Performance and Best Country Album.

== Content ==
Singles from the album include, in order of release: "Mississippi Girl", "Like We Never Loved at All", "The Lucky One", "Sunshine and Summertime" and "Stealing Kisses". Of these, "Mississippi Girl" was a Number One on the US Billboard country charts. The other singles peaked at numbers 5, 5, 7 and 36 on that chart, respectively. Of the singles, "Mississippi Girl", "Like We Never Loved at All" and "Sunshine and Summertime" were co-written by John Rich of Big & Rich, while The Warren Brothers (Brad and Brett) co-wrote "The Lucky One", a song on which Brett also sings backing vocals. Other backing vocalists on this album include Hill's husband, Tim McGraw (on "Like We Never Loved at All"), Bekka Bramlett, Rhonda Vincent, and Kelly Willis.

Hill produced the entire album, with co-production from Byron Gallimore on tracks 1, 3, 4, 5, 6, 9, 10, and 12, Dann Huff on 7, 8, 13, and 14, and both Gallimore and Huff on 2 and 11.

== Critical reception ==
Professional ratings
Aggregate scores
Source	Rating
Metacritic	57/100
Review scores
Source	Rating
AllMusic	3/5 stars
Billboard	favorable
Blender	3/5 stars
E! Online	B+
Entertainment Weekly	C+
Los Angeles Times	2.5/4 stars
The New York Times	mixed
Rolling Stone	2/5 stars
Slant Magazine	0/5 stars
Stylus Magazine	C

At Metacritic, the album has an average score of 57, indicating "mixed or average reviews".

== Track listing ==
No.	Title	Writer(s)	Length
1.	"Sunshine and Summertime"	Rodney Clawson; John Rich; Kylie Sackley	3:27
2.	"Mississippi Girl"	Rich; Adam Shoenfeld	3:52
3.	"Dearly Beloved"	Georgia Middleman; Fred Wilhelm	2:22
4.	"I Ain't Gonna Take It Anymore"	Kevin Brandt; Bobby Terry	4:00
5.	"Stealing Kisses"	Lori McKenna	4:23
6.	"Fireflies"	McKenna	4:28
7.	"Like We Never Loved at All" (with Tim McGraw)	Vicky McGehee; Rich; Scot Sax	4:22
8.	"I Want You"	Rivers Rutherford; Bobby Tomberlin	4:06
9.	"The Lucky One"	Brad Warren; Brett Warren; Jay Joyce	3:37
10.	"If You Ask"	McKenna	4:15
11.	"We've Got Nothing But Love to Prove" (North American release only)	Darrell Scott	4:35
12.	"You Stay with Me"	John Kennedy; Andrea Stolpe	4:23
13.	"Wish for You"	Darrell Brown; Craig Wiseman	3:28
14.	"Paris"	Blair Daly; Gordie Sampson; Troy Verges	5:20
Total length:			54:36

== Personnel ==
As listed in liner notes.

Musicians

- Greg Barnhill - background vocals (1, 9, 10, 11, 12)
- Bruce Bouton - steel guitar (2, 7, 8, 11), Dobro (8)
- Bekka Bramlett - background vocals (1, 2, 11)
- Tom Bukovac - electric guitar (1, 2, 3, 5–11, 13, 14), acoustic guitar (3, 4, 9)
- Paul Bushnell - bass guitar (all tracks except 5, 8)
- John Catchings - cello (12)
- Matt Chamberlain - drums (8)
- Lisa Cochran - background vocals (13)
- Steve Cohn - accordion (3)
- Perry Coleman - background vocals (2)
- Vinnie Colaiuta - drums (3, 4, 9, 11, 12, 14)
- Eric Darken - percussion (11, 14)
- Dan Dugmore - banjo (1), steel guitar (2, 9, 13), Dobro (5, 6, 10)
- Stuart Duncan - mandolin (1, 5, 6, 7, 10, 13)
- Shannon Forrest - drums (1, 5, 6, 7, 10, 13), percussion (1)
- Paul Franklin - steel guitar (3, 4, 9, 12)
- Byron Gallimore - electric guitar (4, 9), keyboards (5), organ (5), acoustic guitar (10)
- Kenny Greenberg - electric guitar (4, 8, 14), electric mandolin (9)
- Aubrey Haynie - fiddle (3), mandolin (4, 9)
- Mike Henderson - electric guitar (10)
- Wes Hightower - background vocals (3, 4)
- Dann Huff - electric guitar (2, 7), acoustic guitar (8, 11), classical guitar (13)
- Jay Joyce - acoustic guitar (9), electric guitar (9)
- Charlie Judge - keyboards (3, 4, 7, 8, 11–14), organ (11), synthesizer strings (12)
- Tim Lauer - accordion (2)
- Liana Manis - background vocals (3)
- Tim McGraw - background vocals (7)
- Chris McHugh - drums (2)
- Gene Miller - background vocals (9)
- Gordon Mote - piano (13)
- Jimmy Nichols - keyboards (1, 2, 10), piano (4, 5, 8, 12, 14), accordion (6), organ (9)
- Darrell Scott - mandolin (2, 3, 11, 12), acoustic guitar (3, 9), Weissenborn (9)
- Javier Solis - percussion (1, 9, 10, 12)
- Bryan Sutton - acoustic guitar (1, 5, 6, 10, 12)
- Crystal Taliefero - background vocals (9, 11, 12)
- Rhonda Vincent - background vocals (4)
- Brett Warren - background vocals (9)
- Kelly Willis - background vocals (5, 6)
- Glenn Worf - bass guitar (5, 8)

String section on "Paris"

- Violins: Bruce Dukov, Charlie Bisharat, Darius Campo, Roberto Cani, Susan Chatman, Mario Deleon, Armen Garabedian, Berj Garabedian, Endre Granat, Songa Lee-Kitto, Michael Markman, Robert Matsuda, Sara Parkings, Robert Peterson, Michele Richards, Anatoly Rosinsky, Josefina Vergara, John Wittenberg
- Violas: Evan Wilson, Bob Becker, Denyse Buffum, Roland Kato
- Cellos: Suzie Katayama, Larry Corbett, Steve Erdody, Paula Hochalter, Steve Richards, Dan Smith

Production

- Tracks 1, 3–6, 9, 10, 12 produced by Byron Gallimore, and Faith Hill
- Tracks 7, 8, 13, 14 produced by Dann Huff and Faith Hill
- Tracks 2, 11 produced by Byron Gallimore, Dann Huff, and Faith Hill

== Release history ==
Country	Date
United States	August 2, 2005
Italy	August 26, 2005

== Charts ==
=== Weekly charts ===
Chart (2005)	Peak position
Australian Albums (ARIA)	51
Canadian Albums (Billboard)	2
Swedish Albums (Sverigetopplistan)	45
Swiss Albums (Schweizer Hitparade)	37
US Billboard 200	1
US Top Country Albums (Billboard)	1

=== Year-end charts ===
Chart (2005)	Position
US Billboard 200	60
US Top Country Albums (Billboard)	13
Worldwide Albums (IFPI)	36

Chart (2006)	Position
US Billboard 200	54
US Top Country Albums (Billboard)	14

Chart (2007)	Position
US Top Country Albums (Billboard)	66

== Certifications ==
Region	Certification	Certified units/sales
Canada (Music Canada)	Platinum	100,000^{^}
United States (RIAA)	2× Platinum	2,000,000^{^}
^{^} Shipments figures based on certification alone.
