= Beth McKee =

American singer-songwriter

Beth McKee is an American singer-songwriter. McKee moved to Austin, Texas, and became an active part of the music scene. She performed as part of the backing band "The Ladyfingers" for Greg Taylor. This was followed by almost a decade with the band Evangeline, providing keyboards, accordion, and vocals. In 2009, McKee released her solo album I'm That Way, an album of Bobby Charles covers, followed by Next to Nowhere in 2012, "Sugarcane Revival" in 2015, and "Dreamwood Acres" in 2018. McKee is also the founder of the Swamp Sistas La La Foundation. The grassroots organization with the two-fold mission of community service and supporting women in the arts. With the help of the Swamp Sistas, McKee hosts a roving musical festival called the Swamp Sistas La La.

== Early life and education ==
McKee is from Jackson, Mississippi, and has also lived in Louisiana, Texas, and Florida. She worked as a pianist as early as age 14, but had few professional female musician role models and chose to pursue a degree in accounting from Millsaps College. After deciding to change her career path, McKee moved to Austin, TX, and became an active part of the music scene.

== Career ==
=== Bands ===
McKee was invited to tour with her hometown friend Greg "Fingers" Taylor as a member of his female backing band "The Ladyfingers" for Jimmy Buffett's summer tour in 1990.

When the tour ended, McKee moved to New Orleans to join the band Evangeline, providing keyboards, accordion, and vocals. Two months after McKee joined the band, Jimmy Buffett, signed Evangeline to his MCA Nashville imprint, Margaritaville Records, and the group toured as his opening act. The group was successful for a time, and disbanded in the late 1990s.

=== Solo career ===
McKee subsequently moved to Orlando, Florida. In 2009, she released I'm That Way, an album of Bobby Charles covers. Charles was so pleased with her interpretations of his songs that he invited her to sing with him on his final recording. Timeless. "I'm That Way" was followed by Next to Nowhere in 2012, "Sugarcane Revival" in 2015, and "Dreamwood Acres" in 2018. McKee has been compared to Bonnie Raitt, Linda Ronstadt, and Loretta Lynn. Her music features a variety of influences, including blues, Zydeco, Southern rock, country, and gospel. On The Morton Report, Bill Bentley described her 2015 release Sugarcane Revival as "kind of like if Laura Nyro had been roommates with Carole King and Bonnie Raitt on Decatur Street in the French Quarter during the ‘70s."

McKee has described Next to Nowhere as autobiographical, in that the lyrics chronicle her decision to record again, following the breakup of Evangeline. Next to Nowhere was well received critically, with its success partly due to McKee's focus on her background and roots, both musically and otherwise.

== Swamp Sistas foundation ==
McKee's music has found a resonance with a community and 501(c)3 non-profit organization that she established, dubbed Swamp Sistas La La Foundation. In 2010, McKee established a Facebook group. Membership in the Facebook group exceeded 1,300 members in June 2012. In 2016, numbers had risen to 2,600.

The grassroots organization has a two-fold mission of community service and supporting women in the arts. McKee describes her perceptions of the group: "We have one foot in our roots, one foot pointed ahead, we celebrate what we have in common and learn from each other about what we don't." With the help of the Swamp Sistas, McKee hosts a roving musical festival called the Swamp Sistas La La, a modern twist on the traditional Louisiana Creole houseparty to raise funds for a communal cause. In 2015, McKee help a Swamp Sista La La in Orlando as part of the Fringe Festival to support the Second Harvest Food Bank, The PEAS Foundation, and The Fresh Stop Bus.

== Discography ==
- Evangeline, 1992
- French Quarter Moon, 1993
- Louisiana Roots, 2001
- I'm That Way, 2009
- Next to Nowhere, 2012
- Sugarcane Revival, 2015
- Dreamwood Acres, 2018

== Bibliography ==
- Susan Wilson Mills (2015). Swamp Sistas: Beth McKee and a socio-musical swamp revival online and real time. International Journal of Community Music (Volume 8. Issue 1) pp. 105-122
