= Piece of My Heart =

1967 single by Erma Franklin

Single by Erma Franklin
- B-side: "Baby, What You Want Me to Do"
- Released: October 1967
- Recorded: August 1967
- Genre: R&B
- Length: 2:35
- Label: Shout
- Songwriters: Jerry Ragovoy; Bert Berns
- Producer: Bert Berns

Erma Franklin singles chronology
"Big Boss Man" (1967)	"Piece of My Heart" (1967)	"Open up Your Soul" (1967)

Official video
- "Piece of My Heart" on YouTube

"Piece of My Heart" is a romantic soul song written by Jerry Ragovoy and Bert Berns, originally recorded by American gospel and soul singer Erma Franklin in 1967. Franklin's single peaked in December 1967 at number 10 on the Billboard Hot Rhythm & Blues Singles chart in the United States.

The song came to mainstream attention when Big Brother and the Holding Company featuring Janis Joplin on lead vocals covered the song in 1968 for the album Cheap Thrills and had a much bigger hit, after which Franklin's version was nominated for the Grammy Award for Best Female R&B Vocal Performance at the 11th Annual Grammy Awards. The song has since been remade by Dusty Springfield, also in 1968, Faith Hill in 1994 and as a duet by Melissa Etheridge and Joss Stone in 2005.

In 2004, the Big Brother and the Holding Company version was ranked No. 353 on Rolling Stone's list of the 500 Greatest Songs of All Time. The song is also included among The Rock and Roll Hall of Fame's 500 Songs that Shaped Rock and Roll. In 1999, the version of the song by Big Brother and The Holding Company was inducted into the Grammy Hall of Fame. In June 2026, CBS News included the song in its list of the 250 essential American songs of the past 250 years.

== Erma Franklin original version ==
The original version of "Piece of My Heart" was recorded by Aretha Franklin's older sister Erma Franklin in 1967 for producer Bert Berns' Shout label with "Baby, What You Want Me to Do" on the b-side of the 7-inch vinyl single. Bert Berns asked Van Morrison, whom he was producing, to record the song, but Morrison declined, preferring to do his own material.

The song reached number 10 in December 1967 on the Billboard Hot Rhythm & Blues Singles chart in the United States and also peaked at number 62 on the Billboard Pop Singles chart. In Canada, it reached number three on the CKFH Soul Survey. Cash Box said that it "starts with less volume than might be expected, which only emphasizes the build that follows." Record World said "Gospel-shouting side from Erma will turn into a terrific one. Girl really does it."

Franklin's single was nominated for the Grammy Award for Best Female R&B Vocal Performance, with the winner to be revealed in March 1969 at the 11th Annual Grammy Awards. The award went to Franklin's sister Aretha for the song "Chain of Fools".

In the United Kingdom and some other European countries the single was re-released in 1992 after it appeared in a popular Levi's jeans commercial ("Cinderella" a.k.a. "Night and Day" directed by Tarsem Singh). The reissue peaked at number 5 in Denmark, number 9 in the Netherlands and the UK Singles Chart, and number 10 on the Irish Singles Chart.

=== Charts ===
==== Weekly charts ====
Chart (1967–1968)	Peak position
Canada Adult Contemporary (RPM)	3
UK R&B (Record Mirror)	5
US Billboard Hot 100	62
US Hot R&B/Hip-Hop Songs (Billboard)	10

Chart (1992)	Peak position
Belgium (Ultratop 50 Flanders)	33
Denmark (IFPI)	5
Europe (Eurochart Hot 100)	34
Ireland (IRMA)	10
Netherlands (Dutch Top 40)	11
Netherlands (Single Top 100)	9
Sweden (Sverigetopplistan)	25
UK Singles (Official Charts)	9
UK Airplay (Music Week)	21

==== Year-end charts ====
Chart (1992)	Position
UK Singles (OCC)	72

== Big Brother and the Holding Company version ==
"Piece of My Heart"
- Cover of the 1968 Dutch single

Single by Big Brother and the Holding Company

from the album Cheap Thrills
- B-side: "Turtle Blues"
- Released: August 1968
- Genre: Psychedelic rock; blues rock
- Length: 4:15
- Label: Columbia
- Songwriters: Jerry Ragovoy; Bert Berns
- Producer: John Simon

Big Brother and the Holding Company singles chronology
"Blindman" (1967)	"Piece of My Heart" (1968)	"Coo Coo" (1968)

The song became a bigger pop hit when recorded by American rock band Big Brother and the Holding Company in 1968 with lead singer Janis Joplin. The song was taken from the group's album Cheap Thrills, recorded in 1968 and released on Columbia Records. This four-minute, 15-second rendition made it to number 12 on the U.S. Billboard Hot 100 chart. Billboard called it "dynamite," stating that "this raucous dance treatment will rock up the Hot 100." Cash Box said that it is an "explosive performance" with a "power-packed Janis Joplin vocal" and also praised the backing band. The album release was the culmination of a hugely successful year for Joplin with acclaimed performances at the Monterey Pop Festival, Anderson Theater in New York, the wake for Martin Luther King Jr. (with Jimi Hendrix) in New York and on TV's prime-time The Dick Cavett Show.

The song's instrumentation was arranged by Sam Andrew, who performed three distorted, loud guitar solos for a psychedelic touch. The B-side was "Summertime". Another version had the B-side "Turtle Blues".

Franklin said in an interview that when she first heard Joplin's version on the radio, she did not recognize it because of the vocal arrangement. Cultural writer Ellen Willis wrote of the difference: "When Franklin sings it, it is a challenge: no matter what you do to me, I will not let you destroy my ability to be human, to love. Joplin seems rather to be saying, surely if I keep taking this, if I keep setting an example of love and forgiveness, surely he has to understand, change, give me back what I have given". This way, Joplin used blues conventions not to transcend pain, but "to scream it out of existence".

Until her death in 1970, "Piece of My Heart" was Joplin's biggest chart success and best-known song. ("Me and Bobby McGee", which Kris Kristofferson wrote, eclipsed "Piece of My Heart" when it appeared after her death in 1970. It went to number 1 in 1971.) "Piece of My Heart" remains most associated with Joplin and continued to get airplay long after her death. Berns never got to hear Joplin's version, dying of a heart attack on December 30, 1967.

=== Certifications ===
Region	Certification	Certified units/sales
Italy (FIMI)	Gold	25,000^{‡}
New Zealand (RMNZ)	Platinum	30,000^{‡}
United States (RIAA)	Platinum	1,000,000^{‡}
^{‡} Sales+streaming figures based on certification alone.

== Faith Hill version ==
"Piece of My Heart"

Single by Faith Hill

from the album Take Me as I Am
- B-side: "I Would Be Stronger Than That"
- Released: January 13, 1994
- Recorded: 1993
- Genre: Country
- Length: 4:01
- Label: Warner Bros. Nashville
- Songwriters: Jerry Ragovoy; Bert Berns
- Producer: Scott Hendricks

Faith Hill singles chronology
"Wild One" (1993)	"Piece of My Heart" (1994)	"But I Will" (1994)

Music video
- "Piece of My Heart" on YouTube

American country artist Faith Hill included the song on her debut album, Take Me as I Am (1993); her version reached No. 1 on the US Billboard Hot Country Songs chart in 1994. Hill's version was more passive, with traditional country instrumentation. Prior to recording it, Hill had no knowledge of the song. The accompanying music video won an award for Best New Artist Clip of the Year in the category for Country at the 1994 Billboard Music Video Awards.

Hill re-recorded the track for the soundtrack to the television series King of the Hill, released in 1999. This edgier version can also be found on the 1998 international pressing of her third album, Faith (re-titled Love Will Always Win outside the US) and 2001 international greatest hits album There You'll Be. Her original version was included in her 2007 compilation album The Hits.

=== Background ===
At the time Hill recorded her version of "Piece of My Heart", she had no knowledge of the song or Joplin's rendition. Hill's producers told her not to listen to the Joplin version until she had completed her own recording. Hill told Billboard magazine in February 1994, "When that song was brought to me, it was a country version. When I was recording it, everybody was like, 'Oh God, that's Janis Joplin', and I was thinking, 'What's the big deal?' I knew who Janis Joplin was, but I didn't really know any of her stuff. When Warner Bros. found out that I had not heard the original, they said, 'Whatever you do, do not listen to her version until you have finished your record.' When we finished, and they played it for me, I listened to it twice through and thought, 'Dadgum, how in the world did I ever cover that song?'"

=== Critical reception ===
Upon the release, Larry Flick from Billboard magazine wrote, "One test of a great song is the way it stands up to different interpretations. Hill's sunny, effervescent take on this one is the stylistic flipside of Janis Joplin's go-for-broke, raw-throated approach, but if it works, it works." Cyndi Hoelzle and Lisa Smith from the Gavin Report said, "How long did it take you to recognize this song? Faith takes Janis Joplin's classic (actually a 1968 hit for her band Big Brother and The Holding Company) and transforms it into a driving countrified lament."

=== Charts ===
==== Weekly charts ====
Chart (1994)	Peak position
Canada Country Singles (RPM)	1
US Bubbling Under Hot 100 (Billboard)	15
US Hot Country Songs (Billboard)	1

==== Year-end charts ====
Chart (1994)	Position
Canada Country Tracks (RPM)	13
US Country Songs (Billboard)	22

== Shaggy version ==
"Piece of My Heart"

Single by Shaggy featuring Marsha

from the album Midnite Lover
- Released: 1997
- Recorded: 1996
- Genre: Dancehall
- Length: 4:17
- Label: Virgin

Shaggy featuring Marsha singles chronology
"Why You Treat Me So Bad" (1995)	"Piece of My Heart" (1997)	"Luv Me, Luv Me" (1998)

Jamaican reggae artist Shaggy featuring singer Marsha covered the song on his self-produced and fourth album, Midnite Lover (1997). The single, released by Virgin Records in 1997, was a top-10 hit in Italy, New Zealand and the United Kingdom, peaking at number four, six and seven, respectively.

=== Critical reception ===
A reviewer from Music Week gave this version a score of three out of five, adding, "Shaggy's fast-paced vocals get somewhat overshadowed by the smooth, silky presence of Marsha on this unadventurous remake of the Erma Franklin hit." Music Week editor Alan Jones noted that "Shaggy returns in fine style", concluding that "the result is a summery and unique treat, with the Shagmeister's verses interspersed by a fine femme vocalist—credited as Erma herself in sample form, though definitely not." Andy Winter from Smash Hits wrote that it "will have you wrigglin' like a sackful of snakes!"

=== Charts ===
Chart (1997)	Peak position
Italy (FIMI)	4
Italy Airplay (Music & Media)	2
New Zealand (RIANZ)	6
UK Singles (OCC)	7
US Billboard Hot 100	72

== Melissa Etheridge and Joss Stone version ==
A live medley of this song with Janis Joplin and the Full Tilt Boogie Band's 1971 song "Cry Baby" became a hit duet for American rock singer Melissa Etheridge and English soul singer Joss Stone when it was released to iTunes Store after they performed it at the 47th Grammy Awards on February 13, 2005, in tribute to Joplin. Etheridge had previously sung it at Woodstock '94 as part of a four-song medley of Joplin tunes.

Etheridge's medley with Joss Stone made number 32 in the Billboard Hot 100 and number 2 on the Hot Digital Tracks in April 2005. The performance also signaled Etheridge's first public return from her battle with breast cancer; appearing with her head bald from the effects of chemotherapy. Etheridge also recorded a solo version of "Piece of My Heart" on her 2005 greatest hits album Greatest Hits: The Road Less Traveled.

== Beverley Knight version ==
"Piece of My Heart"
- CD single cover

Single by Beverley Knight

from the album Voice – The Best of Beverley Knight
- Released: March 13, 2006
- Length: 4:17 (album version); 3:36 (radio edit)
- Label: Parlophone
- Songwriters: Jerry Ragovoy; Bert Berns
- Producer: Jimmy Hogarth

Beverley Knight singles chronology
"Keep This Fire Burning" (2005)	"Piece of My Heart" (2006)	"No Man's Land" (2007)

On her 2005 Affirmation Tour, English soul singer Beverley Knight performed the song with Ronnie Wood, which encouraged her to make a studio recording of the song. "Piece of My Heart" was the lead single from her 2006 best-of compilation Voice – The Best of Beverley Knight. It peaked inside the top 10 of the UK radio airplay chart. The physical single was released on March 13, 2006.

Due to a change in the UK chart rules which allowed singles to chart purely on downloads a week before their physical release, "Piece of My Heart" entered the UK chart at number 93, becoming one of the first singles to do so. It peaked at number 16 after its physical commercial release. It was Knight's first single to be released as a DVD. It is her longest-running single to date on the UK Singles Chart, spending 11 weeks inside the top 75. It was her thirteenth top 40 entry and her seventh top-20 hit on the UK Singles Chart.

=== Personnel ===
- Beverley Knight – lead vocals
- Bryan Chambers, Billie Godfrey, Louise Marshall – backing vocals
- Martin Slatterty – Wurlitzer organ, Hammond organ
- Sam Dixon – bass
- Jeremy Stacey – drums
- Jimmy Hogarth – guitars, percussion, producer
- Pom (Pierre-Olivier Magerand) – engineer
- Phillip Bodger – mixer

=== Charts ===
Chart (2006)	Peak position
Scottish Singles Sales (Official Charts)	8
UK Singles (Official Charts)	16
UK Hip Hop/R&B (Official Charts)	8

== Other versions ==
- Dusty Springfield on her 1968 album Dusty... Definitely
- Delaney & Bonnie on their 1969 album Home
- Bonnie Tyler, on her 1977 album The World Starts Tonight
- Etta James, on her 1978 album Deep in the Night. Released as a single, it reached No. 93 on the Billboard Hot Soul Singles chart.
- Sammy Hagar, on his 1982 album Standing Hampton. Released as a single, it reached number 73 on the Billboard Hot 100 and number 67 on the UK Singles Chart.
- Nazareth on their 1989 album Snakes 'n' Ladders
- The Move, on the 1999 reissue of their 1968 live album Something Else from The Move
- Bryan Ferry covered the song on his 1973 album These Foolish Things.
- Jenny Morris, 1990, 7 inch single, WEA label
