= Like We Never Loved at All =

- Promo CD cover

Single by Faith Hill featuring Tim McGraw

from the album Fireflies
- Released: August 1, 2005
- Recorded: November 12, 2004
- Studio: Blackbird Studio (Nashville, TN); Emerald Sound (Nashville, TN); Sound Kitchen (Nashville, TN); Paragon Studios (Nashville, TN); Starstruck Studios (Nashville, TN); The Castle (Nashville, TN); Jane's Place (Nashville, TN)
- Genre: Country; country pop
- Length: 4:22
- Label: Warner Bros. Nashville
- Songwriters: John Rich; Scot Sax; Vicky McGehee
- Producers: Dann Huff, Faith Hill

Faith Hill singles chronology
"Mississippi Girl" (2005)	"Like We Never Loved at All" (2005)	"The Lucky One" (2006)

Tim McGraw singles chronology
"Do You Want Fries with That" (2005)	"Like We Never Loved at All" (2005)	"My Old Friend" (2005)

"Like We Never Loved at All" is a song written by John Rich, Vicky McGehee, and Scot Sax and recorded by American country music singer Faith Hill. It was released on August 1, 2005 to country and adult contemporary radio as the second single from her sixth studio album Fireflies (2005). Initially not credited as a featured artist, Hill's husband Tim McGraw is featured singing vocal harmonies. The song lyrically speaks of the protagonist struggling to move on from a former lover who has found a new partner.

The song was a commercial success for both musicians, peaking at number five on the Hot Country Songs. It also peaked at number nine on the Adult Contemporary chart, which led the song to peak at number 45 on the Billboard Hot 100. The couple performed the song on their joint Soul2Soul II Tour 2006, with the pair singing at opposite ends of the stage, with their backs to each other. Hill and McGraw also performed the song at the 2005 CMAs. The pair later won the Grammy Award for Best Country Collaboration at the 2006 Grammy Awards.

The song was later included on McGraw's 2006 compilation album Reflected: Greatest Hits Vol. 2.

== Music video ==
A music video was released in conjunction with the song, directed by Sophie Muller. In it, Hill and McGraw are portrayed as a country music duo in the 1960s (named Jackie and Isaac), who are moving on from a romance they once shared. After the first chorus, Hill leaves the set in distress, retreating to her private room. McGraw follows, and knocks on her door. Inconveniently, his girlfriend arrives and embraces him just as Hill opens the door. Seeing this, she slams it shut again, throwing things around in a fit of aggravation. Later, Hill and McGraw are at a restaurant with various guests, sitting at separate tables. As McGraw is about to stand up, possibly to talk to Hill, her new boyfriend announces to everyone that he wants to marry her, presenting her with a diamond ring. Heartbroken, McGraw walks over to the bar to intoxicate himself. Hill refuses the proposal by shutting the ring box, which McGraw does not see. The couple is also seen performing in front of a red stage. McGraw wears a suit and Hill wears a yellow dress in these scenes.

== Personnel ==
Compiled from liner notes.

- Bruce Bouton — steel guitar
- Tom Bukovac — electric guitar
- Paul Bushnell — bass guitar
- Stuart Duncan — fiddle
- Shannon Forrest — drums
- Dann Huff — electric guitar
- Charlie Judge — keyboards

== Chart performance ==
The song debuted at number 51 on the U.S. Billboard Hot Country Songs for the week ending August 13, 2005.

Chart (2005–2006)	Peak position
Canada AC Top 30 (Radio & Records)	18
Canada Country Top 30 (Radio & Records)	10
US Adult Contemporary (Billboard)	9
US Billboard Hot 100	45
US Hot Country Songs (Billboard)	5
US Billboard Pop 100	64

=== Year-end charts ===
Chart (2006)	Position
US Country Songs (Billboard)	49
US Adult Contemporary (Billboard)	16
