= But I Will =

Single by Faith Hill

from the album Take Me as I Am
- B-side: "Life's Too Short to Love Like That"
- Released: May 16, 1994
- Recorded: 1993
- Genre: Country
- Length: 3:47
- Label: Warner Bros. Nashville
- Songwriters: Troy Seals; Eddie Setser; Larry Stewart
- Producer: Scott Hendricks

Faith Hill singles chronology
"Piece of My Heart" (1994)	"But I Will" (1994)	"Take Me as I Am" (1994)

Music video
- "But I Will" on YouTube

"But I Will" is a song recorded by American country music artist Faith Hill. It was written by Troy Seals, Eddie Setser, and Larry Stewart, produced by Scott Hendricks, and released on May 16, 1994 by Warner Bros. Nashville, as the third single from Hill's debut studio album, Take Me as I Am (1993). The song peaked at number 35 on the US Billboard Hot Country Songs chart. The accompanying music video was directed by Leta Warner and shot in black-and-white.

== Critical reception ==
Larry Flick for Billboard magazine gave the song a positive review by saying, "Hill made a big initial splash singing feisty uptempo numbers, but the power of her pliable, pure country voice has never been better showcased than on this heartfelt ballad about a woman who's had just about enough."

== Chart performance ==
"But I Will" debuted on the US Billboard Hot Country Songs chart the week of June 4, 1994 at number 59, listed as the "Hot Shot Debut" of the week. It reached a peak position of number 35 for the week of July 30, 1994, where it stayed for one week. It stayed in the charts for 12 weeks.

== Music video ==
The music video for "But I Will" was directed by Leta Warner, and produced by Catherine Finkenstaedt and John Duffin. It was shot in black-and-white and added to CMT's playlists for the week of May 1, 1994.

== Charts ==
Chart (1994)	Peak position
Canada Country Singles (RPM)	28
US Hot Country Songs (Billboard)	35

== Release history ==
Release dates and format(s) for "But I Will"
Region	Date	Format(s)	Label(s)	Ref.
United States	May 16, 1994	Country radio	Warner Bros. Nashville	
