= Cry (Faith Hill song) =

2002 single by Faith Hill

Single by Faith Hill

from the album Cry
- B-side: "Wicked"; "Shadows"
- Released: August 19, 2002
- Studio: Rumbo Recorders (Canoga Park, California); The Hit Factory (New York City); Oceanway (Nashville, Tennessee); The Attic (Monrovia, California)
- Genre: Country
- Length: 3:42
- Label: Warner Bros. Nashville
- Songwriter: Angie Aparo
- Producers: Marti Frederiksen; Faith Hill

Faith Hill singles chronology
"There You'll Be" (2001)	"Cry" (2002)	"When the Lights Go Down" (2002)

"Cry" is a song by American country music singer Faith Hill. It was released as the first single from her fifth studio album of the same name (2002). The song was originally written and recorded by singer-songwriter Angie Aparo for his 1999 album, The American. In 2003, at the 45th Annual Grammy Awards, Hill won the Grammy Award for Best Female Country Vocal Performance for "Cry", marking her second win in the category.

Originally released to country radio on August 19, 2002, "Cry" crossed over to pop and adult contemporary radio in September 2002. It spent 11 weeks at number one on the US Billboard Adult Contemporary chart and eventually peaked at number 33 on the Billboard Hot 100 chart. "Cry" also reached number three on the Canadian Singles Chart and was a top-20 hit in Hungary, New Zealand, Norway, Romania, and Spain.

== Chart performance ==
Released on August 19, 2002, "Cry" peaked at number 12 on the US Billboard Country Songs chart and number 33 on the Billboard Hot 100. The song achieved its highest peak on the Billboard Adult Contemporary chart, where it spent 11 weeks at number one.

== Music video ==
The music video for "Cry", directed by Mike Lipscombe and produced by Michael Pierce, features extensive use of CGI. It was added to CMT's playlists on the week ending September 29, 2002.

== Awards and accolades ==
Year	Nominee / work	Award	Result
2003	Grammy Award	Best Female Country Vocal Performance	Won

== Track listings ==
US 7-inch single and UK cassette single

1. "Cry" – 3:46
2. "Wicked" – 4:02

UK, Australian, and Japanese CD single

1. "Cry" – 3:46
2. "Wicked" – 4:02
3. "Shadows" – 4:29

== Credits and personnel ==
Credits are lifted from the Cry album booklet.

Studios

- Recorded at Rumbo Recorders (Canoga Park, California), The Hit Factory (New York City), Oceanway (Nashville, Tennessee), and The Attic (Monrovia, California)
- Mixed at South Beach Studios (Miami, Florida)
- Mastered at The Mastering Lab (Hollywood, California)

Personnel

- Angie Aparo – writing
- Faith Hill – vocals, production
- Marti Frederiksen – background vocals, acoustic and electric guitar, percussion, Pro Tools editing
- Lisa Cochran – background vocals
- Damon Johnson – acoustic, electric, and slide guitar
- Leland Sklar – bass
- Jim Cox – piano, B3, string arrangement
- Eric Carter – keyboard programming
- Vinnie Colaiuta – drums
- Brian Paturalski – recording, Pro Tools editing
- Michael McCoy – additional vocal engineering
- Tom Lord-Alge – mixing
- Doug Sax – mastering
- Robert Hadley – mastering

== Charts ==
=== Weekly charts ===
Weekly chart performance for "Cry"
Chart (2002–2003)	Peak position
Australia (ARIA)	35
Belgium (Ultratop 50 Flanders)	43
Canada (Nielsen SoundScan)	3
Europe (Eurochart Hot 100)	75
Germany (GfK)	93
Hungary (Single Top 40)	13
Ireland (IRMA)	50
Netherlands (Single Top 100)	83
New Zealand (Recorded Music NZ)	16
Norway (VG-lista)	20
Romania (Romanian Top 100)	20
Scottish Singles Sales (Official Charts)	25
Spain (Promusicae)	19
Sweden (Sverigetopplistan)	48
Switzerland (Schweizer Hitparade)	72
UK Singles (Official Charts)	25
US Billboard Hot 100	33
US Adult Contemporary (Billboard)	1
US Adult Pop Airplay (Billboard)	19
US Hot Country Songs (Billboard)	12
US Country Top 50 (Radio & Records)	10

=== Year-end charts ===
2002 year-end chart performance for "Cry"
Chart (2002)	Position
Canada (Nielsen SoundScan)	13
US Adult Contemporary (Billboard)	24
US Adult Top 40 (Billboard)	100
US Hot Country Singles & Tracks (Billboard)	62

2003 year-end chart performance for "Cry"
Chart (2003)	Position
US Adult Contemporary (Billboard)	6
US Adult Top 40 (Billboard)	52

== Certifications ==
Certifications and sales for "Cry"
Region	Certification	Certified units/sales
Canada (Music Canada)	Gold	5,000^{^}
^{^} Shipments figures based on certification alone.

== Release history ==
Release dates and formats for "Cry"
Region	Date	Format(s)	Label(s)	Ref.
United States	August 19, 2002	Country radio	Warner Bros.	
United States	September 9, 2002	Contemporary hit; adult contemporary; hot AC radio	Warner Bros.	
Japan	October 2, 2002	CD	Warner Bros.	
Canada	October 8, 2002	CD	Warner Bros.	

== See also ==
- List of Billboard Adult Contemporary number ones of 2002 and 2003 (U.S.)
