= Wild One (Faith Hill song) =

- Germany CD single cover

Single by Faith Hill

from the album Take Me as I Am
- B-side: "Go the Distance"; "I Would Be Stronger Than That"
- Released: September 23, 1993
- Recorded: July 1993
- Genre: Country
- Length: 2:45
- Label: Warner Bros. Nashville
- Songwriters: Pat Bunch, Jaime Kyle, Will Rambeaux
- Producer: Scott Hendricks

Faith Hill singles chronology
| "Wild One" (1993) | "Piece of My Heart" (1994) |

"Wild One" (originally titled "She's a Wild One") is a song written by Pat Bunch, Jaime Kyle, and Will Rambeaux and most famously recorded by American country artist Faith Hill. Before her version, the song was recorded by both Zaca Creek and Evangeline for their albums Broken Heartland (1993) and French Quarter Moon (1993). Hill's version was released on September 23, 1993, as her debut single and the lead single to her debut studio album Take Me as I Am (1993). Lyrically, "Wild One" speaks of a female protagonist rebelling against her parents' conservative values.

The song quickly became a commercial success, topping the Billboard Hot Country Songs for four weeks in 1994, becoming the first of Hill's nine number one hits and the longest running number one by a female artist on the country charts since 1977. "Wild One" was later included on Hill's 2007 compilation album The Hits.

American Aquarium covered the song on their 2021 album Slappers, Bangers, and Certified Twangers: Vol 1.

== Track listing ==
CD single

1. "Wild One" - 2:45
2. "Go the Distance" - 3:02
3. "I Would Be Stronger Than That" - 4:48

== Chart positions ==
| Chart (1993–1994) | Peak position |
|---|---|
| Canada Country Singles (RPM) | 1 |
| US Hot Country Songs (Billboard) | 1 |

=== Year-end charts ===
| Chart (1994) | Position |
|---|---|
| Canada Country Tracks (RPM) | 27 |
| US Country Songs (Billboard) | 74 |
