= Steve Azar discography =

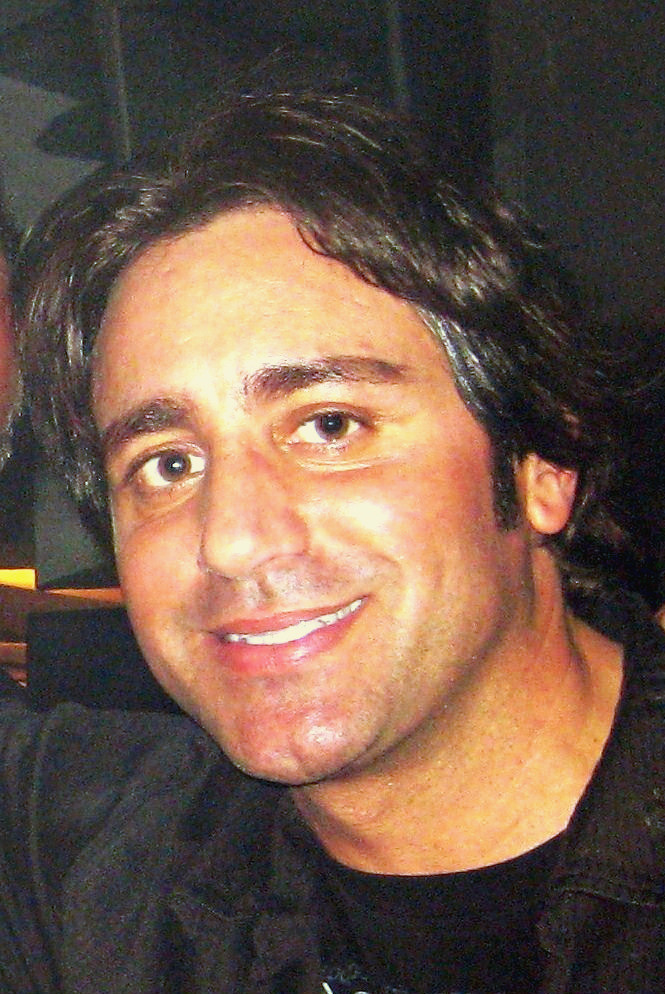
- Azar in 2009
- Studio albums: 7
- Singles: 13
- Music videos: 7

American country music singer Steve Azar has released seven studio albums, thirteen singles, and seven music videos. Azar debuted in 1996 with the album Heartbreak on the former River North Records, which charted two of its three singles on Billboard Hot Country Songs in 1996. 2002's Waitin' on Joe, released on Mercury Records, accounted for his highest-charting single, "I Don't Have to Be Me ('til Monday)", which went to number 2 on Hot Country Songs and number 35 on the Billboard Hot 100 that year. Only one other single, the title track, charted from this project. After being sidelined with a cyst on his vocal cords, he charted his last Mercury release "Doin' It Right" in 2005.

All of Azar's subsequent albums have been released independently, first on Dang Records and then on Ride Records. His independent releases are Indianola (2008), Slide On Over Here (2009), Delta Soul: Volume 1 (2011), Down at the Liquor Store (2017), and My Mississippi Reunion (2020). Slide On Over Here charted additional top-40 Hot Country Songs entries in "Moo La Moo" and "Sunshine (Everybody Needs a Little)". Down at the Liquor Store was recorded in collaboration with various backing musicians for B. B. King and Elvis Presley, and was credited to Steve Azar and the King's Men.

== Studio albums ==
Title	Album details	Peak chart positions	
Title	Album details	US Country	US Heat
Heartbreak Town	Release date: February 27, 1996; Label: River North Records	—	—
Waitin' on Joe	Release date: April 16, 2002; Label: Mercury Nashville	29	31
Indianola	Release date: May 27, 2008; Label: Dang Records	—	—
Slide On Over Here	Release date: August 4, 2009; Label: Ride Records	57	—
Delta Soul: Volume 1	Release date: November 8, 2011; Label: Ride Records	—	—
Down at the Liquor Store (as Steve Azar and the King's Men)	Release date: August 11, 2017; Label: Ride Records	—	—
My Mississippi Reunion (with Cedric Burnside)	Release date: October 23, 2020; Label: Ride Records	—	—
"—" denotes releases that did not chart

== Singles ==
Year	Single	Peak chart positions		Album
Year	Single	US Country	US	Album
1996	"Someday"^{[A]}	51	—	Heartbreak Town
1996	"I Never Stopped Loving You"	50	—	Heartbreak Town
1997	"Nights Like This"	—	—	Heartbreak Town
2001	"I Don't Have to Be Me ('til Monday)"	2	35	Waitin' on Joe
2002	"Waitin' on Joe"	28	—	Waitin' on Joe
2005	"Doin' It Right"	47	—	—
2006	"You Don't Know a Thing"	49	—	Indianola
2008	"I Won't Let You Lead Me Down"	—	—	Indianola
2009	"You're My Life"	52	—	Indianola
2009	"Moo La Moo"	39	—	Slide On Over Here
2010	"Sunshine (Everybody Needs a Little)"	27	—	Slide On Over Here
2011	"Hard Road"	—	—	Slide On Over Here
2020	"Coldwater"	—	—	My Mississippi Reunion
"—" denotes releases that did not chart

Notes

- A "Someday" also peaked at number 65 on the RPM Country Tracks chart in Canada.

== Other charted songs ==
Year	Single	Peak positions
Year	Single	US Country
2006	"Catfish Christmas"	53

== Music videos ==
Year	Video	Director
1996	"Someday"	—
2001	"I Don't Have to Be Me ('til Monday)"	Eric Welch
2002	"Waitin' on Joe"	Steven Goldmann
2005	"Catfish Christmas"	—
2006	"You Don't Know a Thing"	Peter Zavadil
2009	"Moo La Moo"	Eric Welch
2010	"Sunshine (Everybody Needs a Little)"	Eric Welch
