= Kyle discography =

Pop-rap recording artist discography

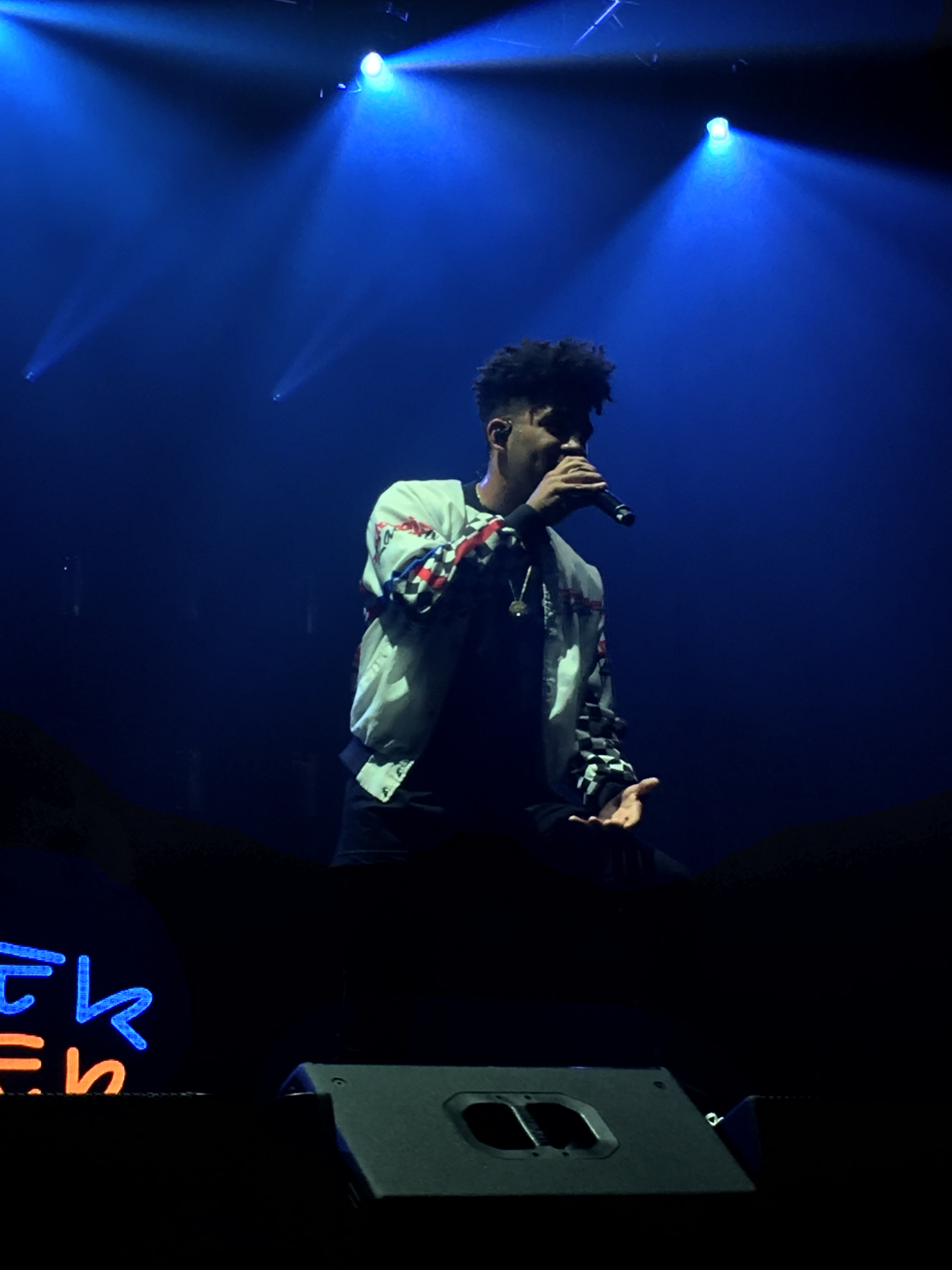
- Kyle in July 2017
- Studio albums: 4
- Singles: 16
- Mixtapes: 7

The discography of Kyle, an American rapper and singer, consists of four studio albums, seven mixtapes and sixteen singles. In the early days of his career, he also released non-commercial mixtapes Senior Year (2010), Second Semester (2011), FxL (2011), Super Duper (2011) and K.i.D (2012) exclusively on Bandcamp under the moniker K.i.D.

== Studio albums ==
List of studio albums, with selected chart positions, sales figures and certifications
Title	Album details	Peak chart positions					Certifications
Title	Album details	US	US R&B/ HH	US Rap	CAN	NLD	Certifications
Light of Mine	Released: May 18, 2018; Labels: Indie-Pop, Atlantic; Format: CD, streaming, digital download, LP	29	16	15	33	144	RIAA: Platinum; MC: Gold
See You When I Am Famous	Released: July 17, 2020; Labels: Indie-Pop, Atlantic; Format: Streaming, digital download, LP	124	—	—	—	—	
It's Not So Bad	Released: January 28, 2022; Labels: Self-released; Format: CD, streaming, digital download	—	—	—	—	—	
Smyle Again	Released: March 8, 2024; Labels: Indie-Pop, Atlantic; Format: CD, streaming, digital download	—	—	—	—	—	

== Commercial mixtapes ==
List of commercial mixtapes, with selected chart positions
Title	Details	Peak chart positions		
Title	Details	US	US R&B/ HH	US Rap
Beautiful Loser	Released: August 5, 2013; Labels: Indie-Pop, Super Duper, Homeboy Music Group; Format: Streaming, digital download, vinyl	—	40	25
Smyle	Released: October 2, 2015; Labels: Indie-Pop; Format: Streaming, digital download, vinyl	76	10	7
"—" denotes a recording that did not chart or was not released in that territory.

== Mixtapes ==
List of mixtapes
Title	Details
Senior Year (as K.i.D)	Released: November 22, 2010; Format: Digital download
Second Semester (as K.i.D)	Released: January 28, 2011; Format: Digital download
FxL (with Mr. Man, as K.i.D)	Released: August 22, 2011; Format: Digital download
Super Duper (as K.i.D)	Released: November 11, 2011; Format: Digital download
K.i.D (as K.i.D)	Released: May 1, 2012; Format: Digital download

== Singles ==
=== As lead artist ===
List of singles as lead artist, with selected chart positions, showing year released and album name
Title	Year	Peak chart positions								Certifications	Album
Title	Year	US	US R&B/ HH	US Rap	AUS	CAN	NLD	NZ	UK	Certifications	Album
"Keep It Real"	2013	—	—	—	—	—	—	—	—		Beautiful Loser
"Fruit Snacks"	2013	—	—	—	—	—	—	—	—		Beautiful Loser
"Bang" (featuring Mr. Man)	2013	—	—	—	—	—	—	—	—		Beautiful Loser
"Raining Love"	2013	—	—	—	—	—	—	—	—		Beautiful Loser
"Don't Wanna Fall in Love"	2014	—	—	—	—	—	—	—	—	RMNZ: Gold	Smyle
"Just a Picture" (featuring Kehlani)	2015	—	—	—	—	—	—	—	—		non-album singles
"King Wavy" (featuring G-Eazy)	2015	—	—	—	—	—	—	—	—		non-album singles
"Doubt It"	2016	—	—	—	—	—	—	—	—		non-album singles
"Blame"	2016	—	—	—	—	—	—	—	—		non-album singles
"iSpy" (featuring Lil Yachty)	2016	4	3	1	33	14	86	22	33	RIAA: Diamond; ARIA: 3× Platinum; BPI: Platinum; MC: 5× Platinum; RMNZ: 3× Platinum	Light of Mine
"Want Me Bad" (featuring Cousin Stizz)	2017	—	—	—	—	—	—	—	—		Non-album single
"Not the Same"	2017	—	—	—	—	—	—	—	—		Sleight soundtrack
"Nothing 2 Lose"	2017	—	—	—	—	—	—	—	—		Non-album single
"To the Moon"	2018	—	—	—	—	—	—	—	—		Light of Mine
"Playinwitme" (featuring Kehlani)	2018	— (Note: "Playinwitme" did not enter the Billboard Hot 100, but peaked at number two on the Bubbling Under Hot 100 Singles chart.)	— (Note: "Playinwitme" did not enter the Billboard Hot R&B/Hip-Hop Songs chart, but peaked at number one on the Bubbling Under R&B/Hip-Hop Singles chart.)	— (Note: "Playinwitme" did not enter the Billboard Hot Rap Songs chart, but peaked at number 25 on the Rap Airplay chart, which is an airplay only component.)	38	46	44	13	61	RIAA: 2× Platinum; ARIA: Platinum; BPI: Silver; MC: Platinum; RMNZ: 2× Platinum	Light of Mine
"Ikuyo" (featuring 2 Chainz and Sophia Black)	2018	—	—	—	—	—	—	—	—		Light of Mine
"Moment" (featuring Wiz Khalifa)	2018	—	—	—	—	—	—	—	—		Light of Mine
"SuperDuperKyle" (featuring MadeinTYO)	2018	—	—	—	—	—	—	—	—		Light of Mine
"Hey Julie!" (featuring Lil Yachty)	2018	— (Note: "Hey Julie!" did not enter the Billboard Hot 100, but peaked at number 23 on the Bubbling Under Hot 100 Singles chart.)	— (Note: "Hey Julie!" did not enter the Billboard Hot R&B/Hip-Hop Songs chart, but peaked at number five on the Bubbling Under R&B/Hip-Hop Singles chart.)	—	—	—	—	— (Note: "Hey Julie!" did not enter the NZ Top 40 Singles Chart, but peaked at number 33 on the NZ Hot Singles Chart.)	—	RIAA: Platinum; RMNZ: Gold	Light of Mine
"F You I Love You" (featuring Teyana Taylor)	2019	—	—	—	—	—	—	— (Note: "F You I Love You" did not enter the NZ Top 40 Singles Chart, but peaked at number 34 on the NZ Hot Singles Chart.)	—		Light of Mine
"Yes!" (featuring Rich The Kid and K Camp)	2020	—	—	—	—	—	—	—	—		See You When I am Famous
"What It Is"	2020	—	—	—	—	—	—	—	—		See You When I am Famous
"Bouncin"	2020	—	—	—	—	—	—	—	—		See You When I am Famous
"Money Now" (featuring Tyga and Johnny Yukon)	2020	—	—	—	—	—	—	—	—		See You When I am Famous
"But Cha" (featuring Josh Golden)	2021	—	—	—	—	—	—	—	—		Non-album singles
"Love Me Like You Say You Love Me"	2021	—	—	—	—	—	—	—	—		Non-album singles
"Optimistic" (with Dougie F)	2021	—	—	—	—	—	—	—	—		It's Not So Bad
"Sunday"	2021	—	—	—	—	—	—	—	—		It's Not So Bad
"Perfect"	2021	—	—	—	—	—	—	—	—		It's Not So Bad
"Carefree"	2022	—	—	—	—	—	—	—	—		Non-album singles
"I Literally Never Think About You"	2022	—	—	—	—	—	—	—	—		Non-album singles
"Silly Rapper Clout Is For Kids"	2022	—	—	—	—	—	—	—	—		Non-album singles
"Losses" (with Harv)	2023	—	—	—	—	—	—	—	—		Non-album singles
"Movin'"	2023	—	—	—	—	—	—	—	—		Non-album singles
"Who's Taking You Home" (featuring Tinashe)	2023	—	—	—	—	—	—	—	—		Smyle Again
"Woah" (with Lay Bankz)	2023	—	—	—	—	—	—	—	—		Smyle Again
"Suddenly"	2023	—	—	—	—	—	—	—	—		Smyle Again
"Somethin Bout U" (featuring Teezo Touchdown)	2023	—	—	—	—	—	—	—	—		Smyle Again
"Forever & Ever & Ever & Even After That"	2024	—	—	—	—	—	—	—	—		Smyle Again
"Father Time"	2024	—	—	—	—	—	—	—	—		Non-album singles
"Dirty"	2024	—	—	—	—	—	—	—	—		Non-album singles
"—" denotes a recording that did not chart or was not released in that territory

=== As featured artist ===
Title	Year	Album
"Hey Now" (Martin Solveig and The Cataracs featuring Kyle)	2013	Non-album singles
"Puff Puff Pass" (Remix) (Brayton Bowman featuring Kyle)	2017	Non-album singles
"Obsession (25/7)" (Vice featuring Kyle and Jon Bellion)	2017	Non-album singles
"Plot Twist" (Marc E. Bassy featuring Kyle)	2017	Gossip Columns
"Everyday" (The Americanos featuring DRAM and Kyle)	2017	Non-album singles
"Real Shit" (Sophia Black featuring Kyle)	2018	Non-album singles
"I Keep On" (Nylo featuring Kyle and SG Lewis)	2018	Non-album singles
"Gucci Rock N Rolla" (Snakehips featuring Rivers Cuomo and Kyle)	2019	TBA
"Y U Gotta B Like That" (Remix) (Audrey Mika featuring Kyle)	2020	TBA
"Bright Lighs" (6ix featuring Kyle and Skizzy Mars)	2025	Homebody
"Firmament" (6ix featuring Kyle, Blu, Buddy, and Like)	2025	Homebody

=== Promotional singles ===
Title	Year	Album
"Sunshine" (featuring Miguel)	2017	Non-album singles
"Off of It" (featuring Ty Dolla Sign)	2017	Non-album singles
"All Mine" (featuring MadeinTYO)	2017	Non-album singles

== Guest appearances ==
List of non-single guest appearances, with other performing artists, showing year released and album name
Title	Year	Other artist(s)	Album
"La La La"	2012	Futuristic	Dream Big
"I'm a Problem"	2013	Futuristic, Sam King	Chasing Down a Dream
"No Budget"	2013	Futuristic, D. Fields, Mr. Man, Sam King, D Why	Chasing Down a Dream
"Silver Haze"	2013	Lincoln Jesser	In My Dreams
"Let Love Come Through"	2013	Yuna	Sixth Street EP
"Keep It Real"	2014	DJ YB the Great	The Love Abyss
"We'll Be Fine"	2014	Lincoln Jesser	Modern Color
"David Blaine"	2015	Sam King	Suburban Trap EP
"Wanna Be Cool"	2015	Donnie Trumpet & the Social Experiment, Big Sean, Jeremih	Surf
"On Your Way"	2015	Austin Mahone	This Is Not the Album
"Champagne and Pools"	2016	Hoodie Allen, Blackbear	Happy Camper and Tnuesdays
"Angel"	2016	The Dolan Twins, Buddy	Tnuesdays
"Oh Yeah"	2016	The Dolan Twins, Chris Plenty, Short Dawg	Tnuesdays
"A Okay"	2016	JC Caylen	Neptønes III: The Final Chapter
"Favorite Colors"	2017	Taylor Bennett, Luke Tennyson	Restoration of an American Idol
"Attention" (Remix)	2017	Charlie Puth	Attention (Acoustic + Remixes)
"Overtime"	2018	Carnage, Sebastian Reynoso	Battered Bruised and Bloody
"Out at Night"	2018	Clean Bandit, Big Boi	What Is Love?
"Nowhere"	2018	Clean Bandit, Rita Ora	What Is Love?
"Big Hearts"	2018	Netsky, Stargate	Abbot Kinney
"Likes"	2019	Yuna	Rouge
"Always"	2020	Kota the Friend, Braxton Cook	Everything
"Pickle"	2020	—	At home with the kids
"Kids"	2021	Benny Sings	Music
"How You Been"	2021	Nevi	onourown.
"Parked Cars"	2021	Travis Thompson, Kota the Friend	BLVD BOY
"Rock the Boat"	2021	Jazz Cartier	The Fleur Print and The Fleur Print, Vol. 2
"Already Know"	2022	Craig David	22 (Deluxe)
"Cruel Love"	2024	Quinn XCII	Quinn XCII Presents: Mustard Mike's Breakfast, Lunch, and Dinner and Breakfast EP
"I Guess"	2024	Jono	Are You Having Fun?
"Raw"	2025	6ix, Joey Valence & Brae, FELIX!, Buddy, Blu	Homebody
"word's don't matter"	2025	Chris Miles	SIXTAPE
"No Going Back"	2026	DameFinallyFree	Finally Free
"SO SAD"	2026	AB	Hall of Famer
"Easter Clothes"	2026	Smoke DZA	Road Trip to Amsterdam
