= Sunshine (disambiguation) =

Sunshine is sunlight, the electromagnetic radiation emitted by the Sun, especially in the visible wavelengths.

Sunshine may also refer to:

== Arts and entertainment ==
=== Films ===
- Sunshine (1948 film), a Swedish film directed by Gösta Werner
- Sunshine (1973 film), an American TV movie starring Cliff DeYoung
- Sunshine (1999 film), a historical film directed by István Szabó
- The Sunshine (2000 film), a documentary film by Phil Bertelsen
- Sunshine (2007 film), a science-fiction film directed by Danny Boyle
- Sunshine (2024 film), a Filipino film directed by Antoinette Jadaone

=== Television shows and episodes ===
- Sunshine (American TV series), a 1975 comedy-drama based on the 1973 TV movie
- Sunshine (British TV series), a 2008 miniseries
- Sunshine (Australian TV series), a 2017 crime drama series
- Sunshine (Tugs character), a fictional "harbour switcher" from the TV series Tugs
  - "Sunshine" (Tugs episode), the pilot episode of Tugs

=== Literature ===
- Sunshine (novel), a 2003 vampire novel by Robin McKinley
- Sunshine (Kinnikuman), a fictional villain in the manga Kinnikuman
- Sunshine (magazine), a digest of uplifting short articles and anecdotes

=== Music ===
==== Bands ====
- Sunshine (American band), a disco group with Donna Summer
- Sunshine (Serbian band), a rapcore/hip hop group

==== Labels ====
- Sunshine Records (Australia), a 1960s pop label
- Sunshine Records (United States), a 1920s California-based label

==== Albums ====
- Sunshine (The Archies album) or the title song (see below), 1970
- Sunshine (Deric Ruttan album) or the title song, 2010
- Sunshine (Dragon album) or the title song (see below), 1977
- Sunshine (The Emotions album), 1977
- Sunshine (Jeff & Sheri Easter album) or the title song, 2004
- Sunshine (Liquid Gang album), 2000
- Sunshine (R.I.O. album), 2011
- Sunshine (S Club 7 album) or the title song, 2001
- Sunshine (Sunny Murray album), 1969
- Sunshine (Talk Normal album) or the title song, 2012
- Sunshine (soundtrack) or the title track, from the 2007 film
- Sunshine, by the Black Moods, or the title song, 2020
- Sunshine, by DJ Hamida, 2021
- Sunshine, by Jungle, 2026
- Sunshine, by Shawn Smith, 2011

==== EPs ====
- Sunshine (EP), by Traci Lords, or the title song, 2004
- Sunshine, by Miranda Sex Garden, or the title song, 1993

==== Songs ====
- "Sunshine" (Aerosmith song), 2001
- "Sunshine" (Alexander O'Neal song), 1989
- "Sunshine" (Alice in Chains song), 1990
- "Sunshine" (Alphrisk song), 2004
- "Sunshine" (The Archies song), 1970
- "Sunshine" (David Guetta and Avicii song), 2011
- "Sunshine" (Dino song), 1989
- "Sunshine" (Dragon song), 1977
- "Sunshine" (Gabrielle song), 1999
- "Sunshine" (Gareth Gates song), 2003
- "Sunshine" (Jonathan Edwards song), 1971
- "Sunshine" (Latto song), 2022
- "Sunshine" (Liam Payne song), 2021
- "Sunshine" (Lil' Flip song), 2004
- "Sunshine" (OneRepublic song), 2021
- "Sunshine" (Ricki-Lee Coulter song), 2005
- "Sunshine" (Rye Rye song), 2010
- "Sunshine" (Tieks song), 2015
- "Sunshine" (Twista song), 2004
- "Sunshine (Everybody Needs a Little)", by Steve Azar, 2010
- "Sunshine on My Shoulders" or "Sunshine", by John Denver, 1973
- "(Always Be My) Sunshine", by Jay-Z, 1997
- "Sunshine", by 5ive from Invincible
- "Sunshine", by the All-American Rejects from When the World Comes Down, 2008
- "Sunshine", by Atmosphere, 2007
- "Sunshine", by the Avalanches from Wildflower, 2016
- "Sunshine", by Barenaked Ladies from Fake Nudes, 2017
- "Sunshine", by the Beach Boys from Keepin' the Summer Alive, 1980
- "Sunshine", by Bliss n Eso from Circus in the Sky, 2013
- "Sunshine", by Buckcherry from 15, 2005
- "Sunshine", by Chancellor and Verbal Jint, 2016
- "Sunshine", by Ant Beale & Charlie Heat, 2017
- "Sunshine", by CocoRosie from The Adventures of Ghosthorse and Stillborn, 2007
- "Sunshine", by Coko from Hot Coko, 1999
- "Sunshine", by De La Soul from Stakes Is High, 1996
- "Sunshine", by Evermore from Dreams, 2004
- "Sunshine", by the First Edition from Ruby, Don't Take Your Love to Town, 1969
- "Sunshine", by Handsome Boy Modeling School from So... How's Your Girl?, 1999
- "Sunshine", by the cast of I Dream from Welcome to Avalon Heights, 2004
- "Sunshine", by Irving Berlin, c. 1927–1931
- "Sunshine", by John Reuben from The Boy vs. the Cynic, 2005
- "Sunshine", by Jonathan Coulton from Solid State, 2017
- "Sunshine", by Juliana Hatfield from In Exile Deo, 2004
- "Sunshine", by Keane from Hopes and Fears, 2004
- "Sunshine", by Kyle, 2017
- "Sunshine", by Lupe Fiasco from Lupe Fiasco's Food & Liquor, 2006
- "Sunshine", by Matisyahu from Spark Seeker, 2012
- "Sunshine", by Matt Costa from Songs We Sing, 2005
- "Sunshine", by Misia from Mars & Roses, 2004
- "Sunshine", by Moka Only and Def3 from Dog River, 2007
- "Sunshine", by Monni, 2011
- "Sunshine", by Naughty by Nature from Poverty's Paradise, 1995
- "Sunshine", by Nicki Minaj and Lil Wayne from Sucka Free, 2008
- "Sunshine", by the O'Jays from Back Stabbers, 1972
- "Sunshine", by Onew from Dice, 2022
- "Sunshine", by Shirley Bassey, 1966
- "Sunshine", by Skylar Grey from Don't Look Down, 2013
- "Sunshine", by Sia from Everyday Is Christmas, 2017
- "Sunshine", by Spooky Tooth from Cross Purpose, 1999
- "Sunshine", by Steve Lacy and Fousheé from Gemini Rights, 2022
- "Sunshine", by Stray Kids from Clé: Levanter, 2019
- "Sunshine", by Teddybears, 2014
- "Sunshine", by Traci Lords, 2004
- "Sunshine", by Tracy Bonham from The Liverpool Sessions, 1995
- "Sunshine", by Tyga, Jhené Aiko, and Pop Smoke, 2022
- "Sunshine", by Umboza, 1996
- "Sunshine", by Yomanda (Paul Masterson), 2000
- "Sunshine (Dance with You)", by Infinity featuring Duane Harden, 2000
- "Sunshine (The Light)", by Fat Joe, 2021
- "Sunshine (Woke Me Up This Morning)", by Labelle from Pressure Cookin', 1973
- "The Sunshine", by Manchester Orchestra, 2017
- "You Brought the Sunshine (Into My Life)", by the Clark Sisters from You Brought the Sunshine, 1981; recorded as "Sunshine" by Sunday Service Choir, 2019

=== Video games ===
- Super Mario Sunshine, a 2002 video game by Nintendo
- Sun Shine, an unreleased 1990 video game

== Businesses ==
- Sunshine, an Australian brand of farm machinery produced by Sunshine Harvester Works
- Sunshine Holdings, a Sri Lankan conglomerate holding company
- Sunshine (magazine), an American monthly digest of short articles and anecdotes from 1924 to 1992

== Media ==
=== Radio stations ===
- Radio Sunshine, a radio station in Niue
- Sunshine FM, a New Zealand radio station
- Sunshine 855, an English radio station

=== Other uses in media ===
- Sunshine Television, the brand name of STQ, a television station in Queensland, Australia

== People ==
=== Given name ===
- Sunshine Anderson (born 1974), American singer
- Sunshine Cruz (born 1977), Filipina actress and singer
- Sunshine Dizon (born 1983), Filipina actress
- Sunshine Sykes (born 1974), American lawyer and US district judge

=== Surname ===
- Caroline Sunshine (born 1995), American actress
- Gary Sunshine, American playwright
- Louise Sunshine (born 1940), American real estate businesswoman
- Ken Sunshine (born 1948), American public relations consultant
- Monty Sunshine (1928–2010), English clarinetist
- Philip Sunshine (1930–2025), American physician and neonatology pioneer
- Spencer Sunshine, American writer
- Tommie Sunshine (born 1971), American musician

=== Nickname, stage name or ring name ===
- Ronnie Bass (born 1955), American football player
- Sunshine Logroño (born 1951), Puerto Rican actor
- Sunshine Sammy Morrison, American child actor, comedian, vaudevillian and dancer Ernest Fredric Morrison (1912–1989)
- Sunshine Parker (1927–1999), American actor
- "Sunshine" Sonny Payne (1925–2018), American radio presenter
- Marion Sunshine, American actress and songwriter Mary Tunstall Ijames (1894–1963)
- Souriya Sunshine, Thai peace activist Souriya Tawancha (born c. 1946)
- Tony Sunshine, American record producer, remixer, DJ and songwriter Thomas Lorello (born 1979)
- Valerie French (wrestling) (born 1962), American professional wrestling valet, ring name Sunshine

== Places ==
=== Australia ===
- Sunshine, New South Wales
- Sunshine, Victoria, a suburb in Melbourne
- City of Sunshine, Victoria, a former local government area

=== United States ===
- Sunshine, Ashley County, Arkansas, an unincorporated community
- Sunshine, Garland County, Arkansas, an unincorporated community
- Sunshine, Colorado, an unincorporated community and census-designated place
- Sunshine, Greenup County, Kentucky, an unincorporated community
- Sunshine, Harlan County, Kentucky, an unincorporated community
- Sunshine, Louisiana

=== Elsewhere ===
- Sunshine, Ontario, Canada, a rural community
- Sunshine, New Zealand, a suburb

== Transportation ==
- SS Sunshine, originally SS Hewsang, a steamship
- Sunshine railway station, Melbourne, Australia
- Wuling Sunshine, a microvan in production since 2002

== Other uses ==
- Sunshine School (disambiguation)
- Project SUNSHINE, a series of research studies to ascertain the impact of radioactive fallout on people
- Sunshine Building, a historic building in Albuquerque, New Mexico, US
- New Sunshine Project, a Japanese technology project
- Sunshine (coyote), or Wendy, a coyote that resided in Los Angeles, California

== See also ==
- Sunshine City (disambiguation)
- Sonshine (disambiguation)
- Sunshyne, a British female pop group
