= Quiet Moments =

Quiet Moments may refer to:

== Music ==
=== Albums ===
- Quiet Moments (album) or the title song, by Lycia, 2013
- Quiet Moments, by Val Doonican, 1981
- Quiet Moments, by Vasco Martins, 1995

=== Songs ===
- "Quiet Moments", by Chris de Burgh from Crusader
- "Quiet Moments", by Lonnie Liston Smith
- "Quiet Moments", by Tim
- "Quiet Moments", from the soundtrack of Seven Years in Tibet

== Other uses ==
- Quiet Moments, a book of photographs by Daryl Hawk
- Quiet Moments, a program broadcast by Sonshine Media Network International
