= Heartbreak Town =

Heartbreak Town may refer to:

- Heartbreak Town (album), 1996 album by Steve Azar
- Heartbreak Town, 2000 album by Ronnie McCoury
- "Heartbreak Town" (song), 2001 song by Dixie Chicks
