= Sonshine =

Sonshine may refer to:

== People ==
- Barry Sonshine (1948–2020), Canadian equestrian

== Music ==
- Blk Sonshine, African jazz duo
- Sonshine (Swoope album), 2018
- Sonshine and Broccoli, Canadian children's music duo
- Sonshine Festival, American Christian music festival

== Media ==
- 98five Sonshine FM, Australian Christian radio station
- Sonshine Media Network International, Filipino broadcast media arm of the Kingdom of Jesus Christ church
  - List of programs broadcast by Sonshine Media Network International
  - DZAR Sonshine Radio
  - Sonshine Sports Management

== See also ==
- Sunshine (disambiguation)
