= Sunshine, Kentucky =

Sunshine, Kentucky may refer to the following unincorporated communities:

- Sunshine, Greenup County, Kentucky
- Sunshine, Harlan County, Kentucky
