= Slide On Over Here =

Studio album by Steve Azar
- Released: August 4, 2009
- Genre: Country
- Label: Ride
- Producer: Steve Azar, Justin Niebank

Steve Azar chronology
Indianola (2008)	Slide On Over Here (2009)	Delta Soul: Volume 1 (2011)

Singles from Slide On Over Here
- 1. "Moo La Moo" Released: April 27, 2009; 2. "Sunshine (Everybody Needs a Little)" Released: January 11, 2010; 3. "Hard Road" Released: February 28, 2011

Professional ratings
Review scores
Source	Rating
Country Weekly	4/5 stars

Slide On Over Here is the fourth studio album by American country music artist Steve Azar. It was released on August 4, 2009, via Ride Records. The album includes the singles "Moo La Moo", which charted in the Top 40 on the Billboard Hot Country Songs chart and "Sunshine (Everybody Needs a Little)", which peaked at number 27.

The album debuted and peaked at number 57 on the U.S. Billboard Top Country Albums chart, becoming Azar's first charting album on that chart since Waitin' on Joe in 2002.

== Critical reception ==
Giving the album four stars out of five, Country Weekly critic Chris Neal called it a "pitch-perfect progression" from Azar's last album (2008's Indianola), saying that it retained Azar's Mississippi-based musical influences "while expanding its musical scope."

== Track listing ==
No.	Title	Writer(s)	Length
1.	"I'll Find Me"	Steve Azar, A. J. Masters, Tony Colton	3:10
2.	"Sunshine (Everybody Needs a Little)"	Azar, Jason Young	4:45
3.	"All I Need"	Azar, Masters, Phillip Moore	4:25
4.	"Moo La Moo"	Azar, Masters, Jim Femino	2:55
5.	"Hard Road"	Azar, James House	4:09
6.	"Back to Memphis"	Azar, House	3:20
7.	"Apart at the Seams"	Azar, House, Jeff Mitchell	3:58
8.	"Sinkin' or Swimmin' (With You)"	Azar, Josh Kelley	3:25
9.	"Take Your Time (Ryan's Song)"	Azar, House	4:15
10.	"Let Go of the Rope"	Azar, House	3:19
11.	"Sweet Delta Dreams"	Azar, Masters, Colton	3:20
12.	"Startin' Today"	Azar, House	3:13
13.	"Beautiful Regret"	Azar	7:17

== Personnel ==
As listed in liner notes.

- Steve Azar – lead vocals, background vocals, electric guitar, acoustic guitar, piano, keyboards, shaker, hand claps
- Gary Burnette – electric guitar
- Tony Colton – piano, organ
- Tom D'Angelo – bass guitar
- Eric Darken – drums
- Mark Easterling – acoustic guitar, electric guitar
- Jim Femino – background vocals
- Trez Gregory – background vocals
- John Henshey – horns
- James House – acoustic guitar, shaker, background vocals
- Josh Kelley – acoustic guitar, background vocals
- A.J. Masters – bass guitar
- Chris McHugh – drums
- Gary Morse – pedal steel guitar, Weissenborn
- Russ Pahl – pedal steel guitar, lap steel guitar
- Rich Redmond – drums
- Dana Robbins – horns
- Chris Tuttle – piano, organ
- Quentin Ware – horns
- Jason Young – harmonica, percussion, congas, background vocals

Tracks 1–4, 8, 9, 12, 13 produced by Steve Azar and Justin Niebank; all other tracks produced by Steve Azar.

== Charts ==
Chart (2009)	Peak position
U.S. Billboard Top Country Albums	57
