= Indianola (album) =

Studio album by Steve Azar
- Released: May 27, 2008
- Genre: Country
- Label: Dang
- Producer: Steve Azar

Steve Azar chronology
Waitin' on Joe (2002)	Indianola (2008)	Slide On Over Here (2009)

Indianola is the third studio album by American country music artist Steve Azar. His first studio album since Waitin' on Joe from six years previous, it was initially to have been released in April 2006 on Midas Records Nashville, the same year that its lead-off single "You Don't Know a Thing" charted at #49 on the Billboard country charts. The album was not released until May 2008, on Azar's own Dang Records label. The follow-up single "I Won't Let You Lead Me Down" failed to chart in 2008 while the third single, "You're My Life", debuted at #57 on the Hot Country Songs chart in January 2009 becoming his first chart single in 3 years. The song "Crowded" was co-written by former Trick Pony member Ira Dean.

== Track listing ==
1. "Crowded" (Steve Azar, Ira Dean, Jason Young) – 3:14
2. "You Don't Know a Thing" (Azar, Radney Foster) – 4:04
3. "You're My Life" (Azar, Foster) – 4:09
4. "Still Tryin' to Find My Way Around" (Azar, Neal Coty, Phillip B. White) –3:43
5. "Empty Spaces" (Azar, Rafe Van Hoy) – 4:34
6. "What's Wrong with Right Now" (Azar, John Kennedy) – 3:36
7. "The River's Workin'" (Azar, Van Hoy) – 6:02
8. "I Won't Let You Lead Me Down" (Azar, Walt Wilkins) – 3:55
9. "The Coach" (Azar, Coty, A. J. Masters) – 4:11
10. "Prelude" (Azar) – 2:19
11. "Flatlands" (Azar, Roger Murrah) – 4:59
12. "Bluestune" (Azar, Young) – 4:12
  - duet with Jason Young
13. "Indianola" (Azar) – 4:34

== Personnel ==
- Steve Azar- acoustic guitar, lead vocals, background vocals
- Kelly Back- 12-string electric guitar, electric guitar
- Ira Dean- bass guitar, acoustic guitar, tambourine
- Mark Easterling- electric guitar, slide guitar
- Radney Foster- acoustic guitar, electric guitar, soloist
- Tommy Harden- drums
- A.J. Masters- bass guitar, acoustic guitar
- Dr. Rudy Miller- drums, shaker
- Gary Morse- banjo, dobro, steel guitar, Weissenborn
- John Wallum- Hammond B-3 organ
- Jason Young- congas, drums, harmonica, percussion, background vocals, duet vocals on "Bluestune"
- Jonathan Yudkin- mandolin, strings
