= Steve Azar =

American singer-songwriter

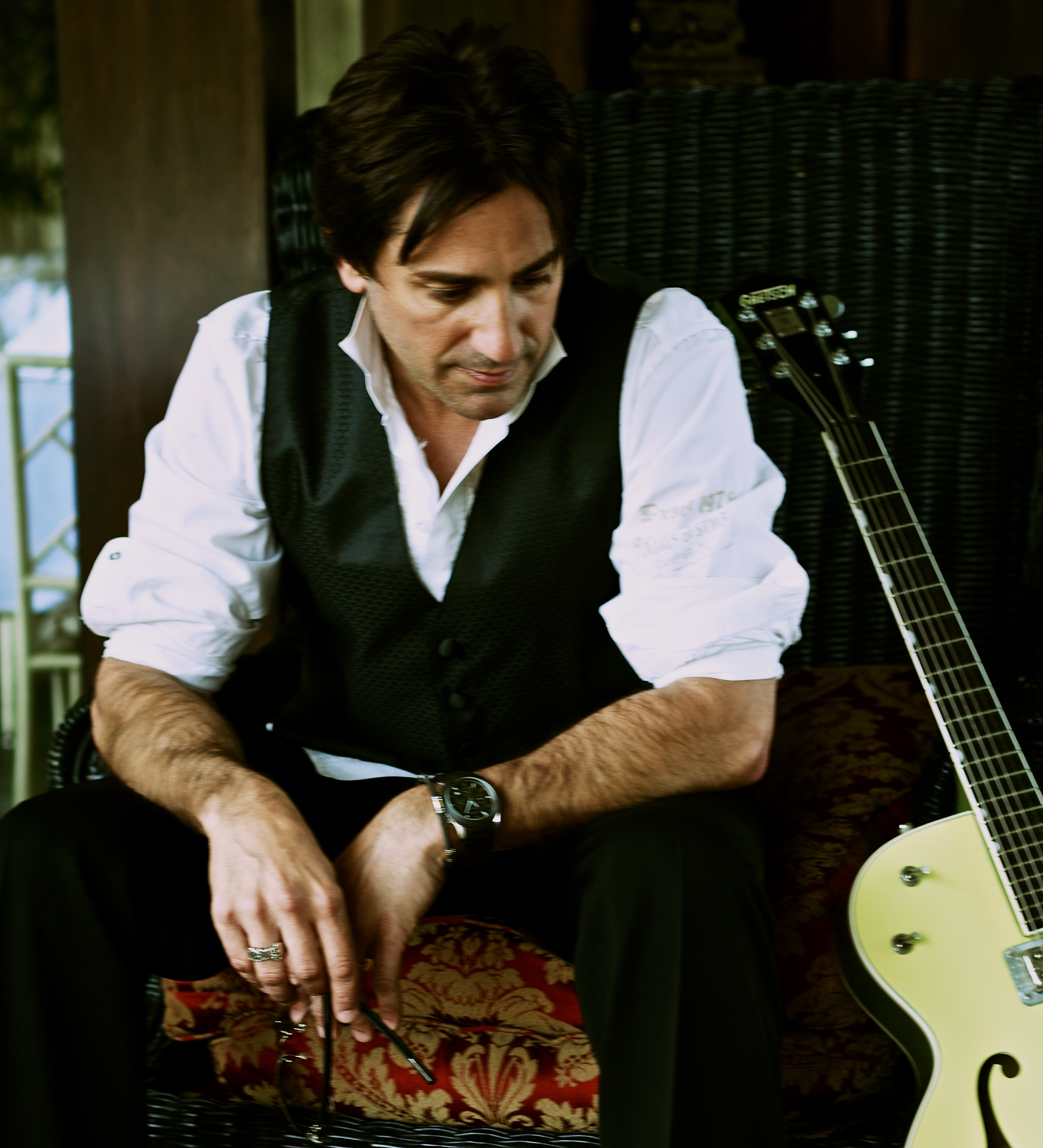
- Azar in 2021

Background information
- Born: Stephen Thomas Azar; April 11, 1964 (age 62); Greenville, Mississippi, U.S.
- Origin: Nashville, Tennessee, U.S.
- Genre: Country
- Occupations: Singer; Songwriter; Record producer
- Instruments: Vocals; Guitar; Mandolin
- Works: Steve Azar discography
- Years active: 1996-present
- Labels: River North; Mercury Nashville; Midas; Dang; Ride
- Spouse: Gwen Nabholz (m. 1989)
- Website: www.steveazar.com

Stephen Thomas Azar (born April 11, 1964) is an American country music singer, songwriter, guitarist, and philanthropist. Active since 1996, he has released a total of seven studio albums: one on the former River North Records, one on Mercury Nashville, and five independently. Azar has charted nine times on Billboard Hot Country Songs, most successfully with his late 2001-early 2002 hit "I Don't Have to Be Me ('til Monday)", which reached the number two position there. After leaving Mercury in 2005, Azar began recording independently; Slide On Over Here, his second independently released album, charted the top-40 country singles "Moo La Moo" and "Sunshine (Everybody Needs a Little)" in 2009.

In addition to these albums, Azar released a number of standalone songs including a song to promote the National FFA Organization and a jingle for McDonald's restaurants. His 2017 album Down at the Liquor Store featured a number of guest musicians who had previously played for B. B. King and Elvis Presley, and was credited to Steve Azar and the King's Men. Azar has written most of his own songs, and his style draws from country, rock, and Delta blues, with his singing voice gaining frequent comparisons to John Mellencamp. In addition to his albums, Azar has also hosted a number of charities and music festivals. In 2017, he was named Music and Cultural Ambassador of Mississippi by that state's then-governor Phil Bryant. Azar's song "One Mississippi" has also been named as the official state song of Mississippi and adapted into a children's book.

== Biography ==
Stephen Thomas Azar was born on April 11, 1964 as one of five children born to couple Joe and Virgie Azar in Greenville, Mississippi. He is of Lebanese and Syrian descent. He began writing songs as a child, primarily for use in Catholic Mass and other liturgies at his church. When Azar was 10 years old, he began receiving guitar lessons from Delta blues singer Sonny Boy Nelson. He was a regular customer at a liquor store that Azar's father owned. Azar had his first recording session in Nashville, Tennessee, at age 15 when his father took him there to cut demos. After high school, Azar attended Delta State University, from which he graduated with a degree in business management. Azar began touring locally at various clubs around Mississippi with a band that included his brother, Joe Azar Jr. When one of his band members committed suicide and another was incarcerated for murder, he switched to performing as a solo act. In addition, he and Joe owed money towards equipment they had bought. After the payments had been completed, Azar and his wife moved to Nashville in 1993 so he could pursue a recording contract.

== Music career ==
=== 1993-2000: Early career ===
In the mid-1990s, after moving to Nashville, Azar signed his first songwriting contract. Dissatisfied with the fast pace of the contract and the inability to put "emotion" in his material, he ended his contract to sign with the independent River North Records in 1996. That same year, he released his debut album Heartbreak Town. The album's first two singles "Someday" and "I Never Stopped Loving You" both charted on the Billboard Hot Country Songs in 1996. "Nights Like This" was also issued as a single, but it did not chart. "Someday" also received a music video which aired on the former TNN (The Nashville Network). River North's founder, Joe Thomas, produced the album except for the final track, which Azar co-produced with songwriter A. J. Masters. These three (along with Roger Murrah and Bob Regan) were among the contributing musicians, and Azar co-wrote every track except for a cover of Paul Davis' "I Go Crazy". An un-credited review in Billboard was favorable toward the album, comparing Azar's voice to those of Bruce Springsteen and John Mellencamp. Reviewers also commended Azar's songwriting and musical image. A less positive review came from Larry Stephens of Country Standard Time, who also compared Azar to Mellencamp vocally but felt most of the songs sounded too similar to each other.

Azar would later go on to deride Heartbreak Town, stating in 2003 that the album "didn't even sound like [him]". His wife shared a similar opinion, and according to Azar, she cried after hearing the album because she felt that it did not represent him as an artist. After River North Records filed for bankruptcy and closed in 1997, Azar continued to tour the Southern United States and write songs. Despite the label closing, Azar had to wait two years to buy out his contract for $15,000.

=== 2001-05: Mercury Records ===
Former River North executive Michael Powers had begun working at Mercury Records' Nashville division and recommended Azar to label executives. The company initially turned him down. However, a songwriting session with Rafe Van Hoy led to songs that both Azar and Mercury executives felt represented his artistic style, leading to his signing in 2001. His first Mercury single was "I Don't Have to Be Me ('til Monday)", which peaked at number two on the Hot Country Songs chart. It also accounted for his only entry on the Billboard Hot 100, where it peaked at number 35. The song was the lead single to Azar's 2002 album Waitin' on Joe. Van Hoy produced the album, and Azar wrote or co-wrote every song. They, along with blues guitarist Sonny Landreth, were also among the contributing musicians. "Waitin' on Joe" was the disc's second single and also charted on Hot Country Songs in 2002. Both songs were also made into music videos; the latter's was filmed in Clarksdale, Mississippi, and featured an appearance by Morgan Freeman. Country Standard Time reviewer Jeffrey B. Remz called the album's production "a bit bright and polished", but praised Azar's songwriting and singing, particularly on the title track.

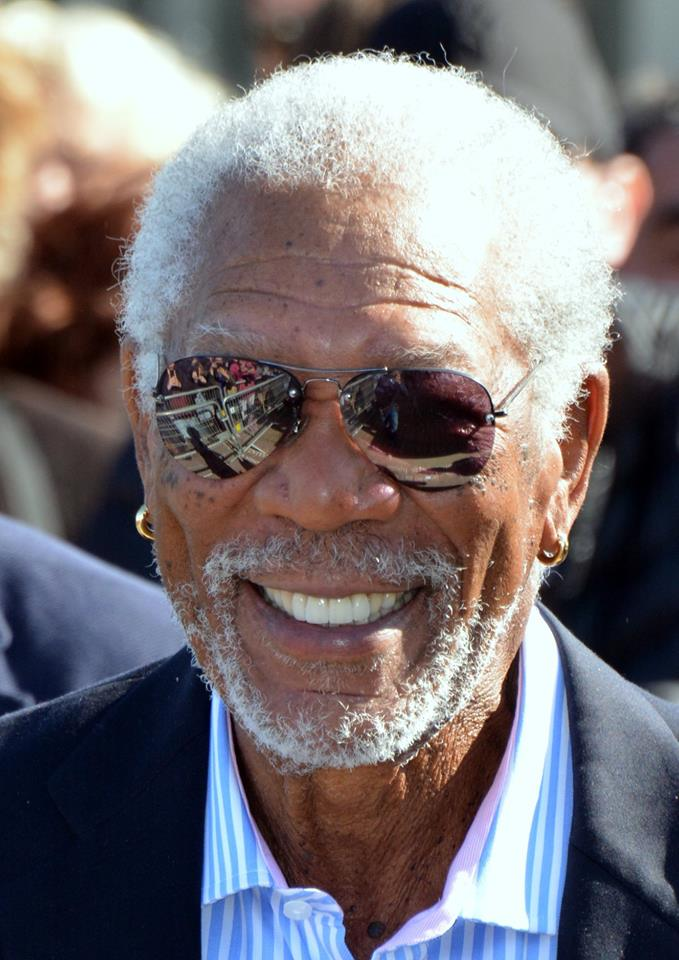
Morgan Freeman appeared in the music video for Azar's 2002 single "Waitin' on Joe".

Azar toured extensively throughout 2002 and 2003 to promote Waitin' on Joe, averaging 250 shows per year. This extensive schedule led to him developing a cyst on his vocal cords, which was surgically removed in 2004. Also that year, "I Don't Have to Be Me" received a Million-Air Award from Broadcast Music Incorporated (BMI) which commemorated the song for being played one million times on radio. Azar shared this award with the song's co-writers, Jason Young and R. C. Bannon. His final single for Mercury was "Doin' It Right", which was released in mid-2005 but fell short of top 40 on Hot Country Songs. Following this single's under-performance, Azar ended his contract with Mercury.

=== 2006-08: Move to independent labels ===
In 2006, Azar founded his own label called Dang Records. His first release for the label was a Christmas song called "Catfish Christmas", which he and Van Hoy cowrote. Over the next two years he began working on his next studio album. For this project, he served as producer and audio engineer. He also was credited playing acoustic guitar, electric guitar, slide guitar, and mandolin. In February 2006, Azar announced that Dang Records had partnered with Midas Records Nashville for the distribution of the album. He charted the Radney Foster co-write "You Don't Know a Thing" while on Midas. The song also received a music video which featured an appearance by golfer John Daly. Between 2006 and 2007, Azar toured with Bob Seger.

Azar experienced delays in releasing his material while on Midas, citing both creative differences and the label's inexperience. This led to him exiting Midas and co-founding a new label called Ride Records in April 2008. On Ride, he released Indianola that same year. While his first Ride single "I Won't Let You Lead Me Down" failed to chart, his next single "You're My Life" reached number 52 on Hot Country Songs in 2009. At the time of the album's release, Azar said that many of the songs from the project grew from songwriting sessions with Foster and James House, and that he wanted to form an independent label so that he could have control over aspects such as sales and promotion. He, House, and John Brannen promoted the album through performances at Nashville's Bluebird Café in late 2008. Ken Tucker of Billboard found influences of country, blues, and rock in the production and songwriting choices, variously comparing tracks to Seger, Jackson Browne, and the Traveling Wilburys. Ben Scott of The Oklahoman called the album "a nice mix of bluesy, contemporary rock with country influences".

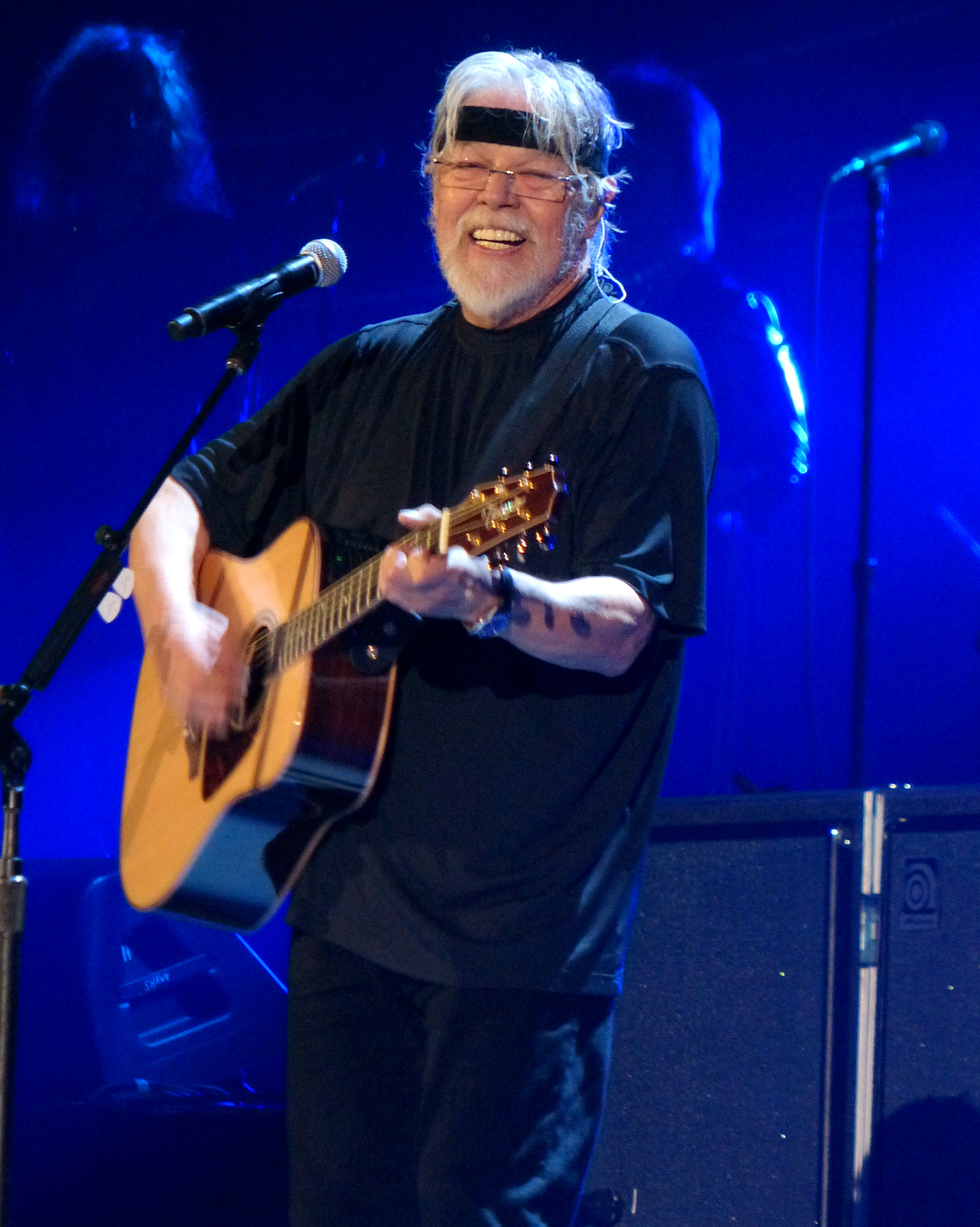
In 2006 and 2007, Azar toured with Bob Seger.

=== 2009-present: Further independent albums ===
One year later, Azar released another album on Ride Records entitled Slide On Over Here. Once again, Azar wrote or co-wrote every song. He told CMT that Seger was one of the primary influences in his songwriting: "he’s pretty much the entire gamut of emotions and I felt like I was leaving some of them in the drawer. So, I pulled them out for this record." Azar co-produced the album with Justin Niebank, while both House and Josh Kelley co-wrote songs and provided backing vocals. Two of the album's singles, "Moo La Moo" and "Sunshine (Everybody Needs a Little)", both made top 40 on Hot Country Songs. The third single, "Hard Road", did not chart. Giving the album four stars Country Weekly critic Chris Neal called it a "pitch-perfect progression" from Indianola. Azar's next album was Delta Soul, Volume One in 2011. The album featured four original songs and five re-recordings of previously released material. James House once again contributed backing vocals. Matt Bjorke of Roughstock reviewed the album favorably, commending Azar's vocal performance along with the inclusion of slide guitar and Hammond organ in the production. The album's re-recording of "Doin' It Right" later appeared on the soundtrack of the 2012 Kevin James film Here Comes the Boom.

Azar recorded a number of promotional singles throughout the 2010s. The first of these was 2012's "American Farmer", which the National FFA Organization sold at conventions. In 2015, Azar collaborated with Sophie Young to record the song "The Sky Is Falling (Patti Jo's Prayer)", which dealt with the subject of human trafficking. A high school senior in Portland, Maine, heard the song and assembled a music video through the assistance of police detective Sgt. Steve Webster, a friend of Azar's. The music video was released on YouTube and its proceeds were donated to Not Here Justice in Action Network (a non-profit dedicated to the cause). In 2017, he recorded a television commercial jingle for McDonald's to promote their all-day breakfast menu.

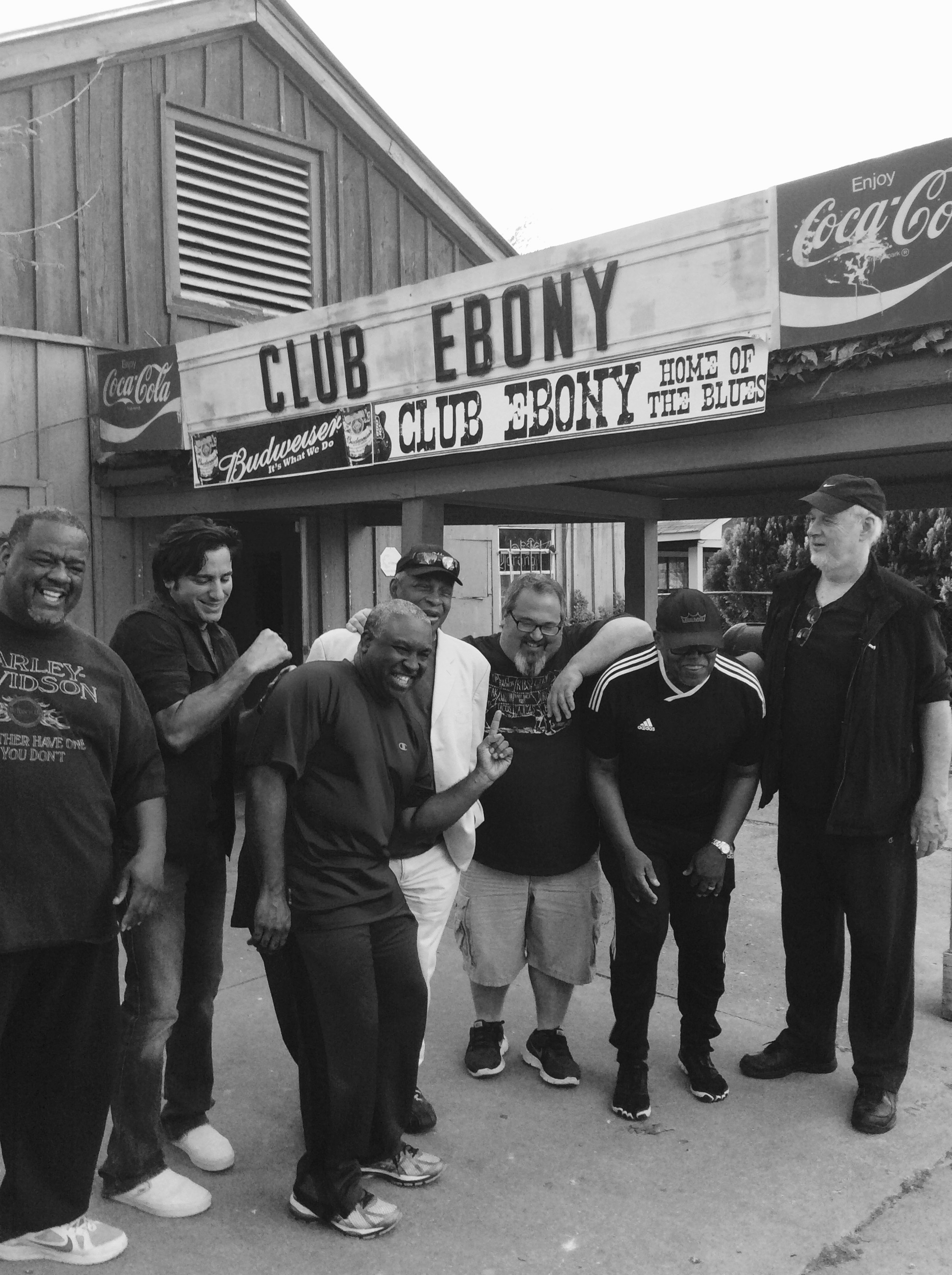
Azar (second from left) with the King's Men, 2017.

Also in 2017, he assembled a number of musicians who had backed B. B. King and Elvis Presley to create a Delta blues project known as Steve Azar and the King's Men. The aggregation released the album Down at the Liquor Store in August 2017, which was accompanied by a making-of documentary titled Something in the Water filmed by Azar's son Strack. It was recorded at Club Ebony, a part of B. B. King's museum in Indianola, Mississippi. Markos Papadatos of Digital Journal called the collection a "sultry album", also stating that "One can hear Azar's heart on this record".

This project was followed in 2020 by My Mississippi Reunion, a collaboration with blues drummer Cedric Burnside. Each song on the album references a city or aspect of the state of Mississippi. The album's lead single, "Coldwater", was released that August. After its release, the Mississippi Institute of Arts and Letters named the album as its 2021 winner in the category of Best Contemporary Music Composition.

In 2024, Azar contributed the song "Our Castle Is Your Home" to the multi-artist charity album Rock for Children, a children's charity album created by Alice Cooper. The album was nominated for Grammy Award for Best Children's Music Album at the 2025 Grammy Awards.

== Musical styles and legacy ==
In a 1996 article from The Clarion-Ledger, news writer Gary Pettus stated that Azar considered Hank Williams, B. B. King, Conway Twitty, and Neil Diamond to be primary musical influences. Pettus also wrote that "[w]hile the tunes themselves don't mimic the blues riffs Azar absorbed growing up in the Delta, the intensity and passion of his playing does." Azar also noted that both blues and country were influential in forming his style. He told CMT in 2002 that "Country music to me has always been about real life and real things and real people and real life situations, a lot like the blues was. I’m not a blues man, I didn’t live their life. I grew up around it". As Azar largely writes his own songs, he has stated that he can "only write what I know, and I know the Delta". In particular, he said that his uncle Joe Nosef, a former mayor of Clarksdale, Mississippi who died of cancer at age 35, was one of the main inspirations behind "Waitin' on Joe". Azar's singing voice has been compared to that of John Mellencamp, with Ben Scott of The Oklahoman calling him a "younger, less jaded" variant of the same. Matt Bjorke of Roughstock called Azar's voice "buttery-smooth" and "soulful", comparing him positively to John Hiatt.

Azar's musical representation of Mississippi has led to honors by two different state governors: Ronnie Musgrove declared March 13 "Steve Azar Day" to reflect Azar's positive portrayals of the state in the music videos for "I Don't Have to Be Me" and "Waitin' on Joe", while Phil Bryant named him Music and Cultural Ambassador of Mississippi in 2017. The latter also requested that Azar write a song to honor the state's bicentennial in 2017. This song, "One Mississippi", appeared on My Mississippi Reunion. In 2022, state governor Tate Reeves signed a bill making "One Mississippi" the official state song of Mississippi. The song was also adapted into a children's book of the same name, with illustrations by Sarah Frances Hardy. Following the book's release, Azar performed the song at Pontotoc Elementary School in Pontotoc, Mississippi, and gave copies of the book to every child in attendance.

== Personal life ==
Azar has been married to the former Gwen Nabholz since 1989. The two met at a show where he was performing in Fayetteville, Arkansas. The Azars have three children: sons Strack and Adrian, and daughter Cecilia. They have resided in Greenville, Mississippi, since 2011.

In 2006, the two started the St. Cecilia Foundation, which raises money for children's musical education. Azar competed on a special week of the game show Wheel of Fortune in 2007 which featured country music singers playing the game to raise money for charity, and raised $22,600 for the St. Cecilia Foundation on his episode. As of 2024, the St. Cecilia Foundation has donated over $1,400,000 in grants and scholarships. He also serves as a musical mentor and artist in residence for Delta Music Institute, which is part of Delta State University. Azar also enjoys golfing, and has been ranked by Golf Digest on multiple occasions as one of the most popular musicians who also plays golf.

Azar started the Mighty Mississippi Music Festival, an annual music festival held in his hometown of Greenville, Mississippi, in 2013. The 2015 installment featured performances from Old Crow Medicine Show and Chris Stapleton among others. This festival is intended to honor country and blues musicians, mainly those who are natives of Mississippi. The festival was relocated to Clarksdale, Mississippi, in 2020.

== Discography ==
- Heartbreak Town (1996)
- Waitin' on Joe (2002)
- Indianola (2008)
- Slide On Over Here (2009)
- Delta Soul: Volume 1 (2011)
- Down at the Liquor Store (2017)
- My Mississippi Reunion (2020)
