= Smyle Again =

Studio album by Kyle
- Released: March 8, 2024
- Length: 35:53
- Label: Indie-Pop; APG
- Producer: Nate Fox; Sushi Ceej; Natra Average; Ricci Riera; Seno; Alex Goldblatt; Khris Riddick; A. Lau; Charley Cooks; ELIWTF; Waverunner; Blazin Beats; TWLVE; Tiggi; Shaan Ramaprasad

Kyle chronology
| It's Not So Bad (2022) | Smyle Again (2024) |

Singles from Smyle Again
- 1. "Who's Taking You Home" Released: April 7, 2023; 2. "Woah" Released: July 11, 2023; 3. "Suddenly" Released: September 8, 2023; 4. "Somethin Bout U" Released: November 10, 2023; 5. "Forever & Ever & Ever & Even After That" Released: March 1, 2024

Deluxe edition cover
- Smyle Again (Deluxe)

Singles from Smyle Again (Deluxe)
- 1. "Father Time" Released: June 14, 2024; 2. "Dirty" Released: July 1, 2024

Smyle Again (stylized in all caps) is the fourth studio album by American rapper and singer Kyle, released on March 8, 2024 by Independently Popular and APG. The album was executive produced by Nate Fox and Sushi Ceej; with production by Nate Fox, Sushi Ceej, Natra Average, Ricci Riera, Seno, Alex Goldblatt, Khris Riddick, A. Lau, Charley Cooks, ELIWTF, Waverunner, Blazin Beats, TWLVE, Tiggi, and Shaan Ramaprasad; and guest appearances from Guapdad 4000, Teezo Touchdown, Lay Bankz, and Tinashe. Smyle Again spawned five singles: "Who's Taking You Home", "Woah", "Suddenly", "Somethin Bout U", and "Forever & Ever & Ever & Even After That".

== Background ==
Smyle Again follows the release of his 2022 record It's Not So Bad and is a sequel to his 2015 commercial mixtape Smyle.

=== Artwork ===
The cover art was designed by Eric Wada of Wada Studio, previously collaborated at ComplexCon November 2017, and ko aka koala, with Claire Kyra as the model.

== Critical reception ==
Professional ratings
Review scores
| Source | Rating |
|---|---|
| Ratings Game Music | D+ |

== Track listing ==
Track listing and credits adapted from Apple Music and Tidal.

Smyle Again track listing
| No. | Title | Writer(s) | Producer(s) | Length |
|---|---|---|---|---|
| 1. | "Onceuponatimeinthe805 (Else's)" | Kyle Harvey; Nate Fox; Shaan Ramaprasad; Sushi Ceej | Nate Fox; Sushi Ceej | 3:42 |
| 2. | "And U Know It" | Harvey; Fox; Ceej | Fox; Natra Average; Sushi Ceej | 2:49 |
| 3. | "Fly Me Out" (featuring Guapdad 4000) | Harvey; Akeem Ali Douglas Hayes; Simrat Chahal | Ricci Riera; Seno | 2:45 |
| 4. | "Inside You" | Harvey; Fox; Ceej | Fox; Sushi Ceej | 2:16 |
| 5. | "I Remember" | Harvey; Fox; Ramaprasad; Ceej | Nate Fox; Sushi Ceej | 2:16 |
| 6. | "Somethin Bout U" (featuring Teezo Touchdown) | Harvey; Aaron Lashane Thomas; Lawson | Alex Goldblatt; Khris Riddick | 2:52 |
| 7. | "Woah" (featuring Lay Bankz) | Harvey; Adrian Lau; Charles Forsberg III; Elias Cash Reitzfeld; Jonathan White; Jose Zapata; Layia Watkins; Rakim Allen | A. Lau; Charley Cooks; ELIWTF; Waverunner | 2:48 |
| 8. | "Neva Beta" | Harvey; Fox; Siobhan Bell; Ceej | Nate Fox; Sushi Ceej | 1:30 |
| 9. | "Who's Taking You Home" (featuring Tinashe) | Harvey; Sufyan Jae; TWLVE | Blazin Beats; Fox; Sushi Ceej; TWLVE | 2:42 |
| 10. | "Suddenly" | Harvey; Trinidad James | Seno; Tiggi | 2:01 |
| 11. | "Rain" | Harvey; Ramaprasad | Axel; Fox; Tiggi | 2:47 |
| 12. | "Sweetest Thing" | Harvey; Fox; Ramaprasad; Shawn Mendes; Ceej | Fox; Ramaprasad; Ceej | 3:42 |
| 13. | "Forever & Ever & Ever & Even After That" | Harvey; Fox; Ramaprasad; Ceej | Fox; Ramaprasad; Ceej | 3:35 |
| Total length: | | | | 35:53 |

Deluxe edition
| No. | Title | Writer(s) | Producer(s) | Length |
|---|---|---|---|---|
| 14. | "Father Time" | Harvey; Fox; Nico | Nate Fox; Nico | 2:26 |
| 15. | "Dirty" (featuring Hit-Boy) | Harvey; Chauncey Hollis Jr. | Hit-Boy; Johnathan Hulett | 3:30 |
| 16. | "You Should Know" (featuring Foggieraw) | Harvey; Jesse Lawrence Owusu | Jay Versace; Othello | 5:04 |
| Total length: | | | | 46:53 |

Notes

- "Woah" is stylized as "WOAH".
