= The After Party (film) =

2018 film by Ian Edelman

- Film release poster
- Directed by: Ian Edelman
- Screenplay by: Ian Edelman
- Produced by: Russell Simmons; Jake Stein; Jamie Patricof; Heather Parry; Trevor Engelson; Doug Banker; Lee "Q" O’Denat
- Starring: Kyle Harvey; Harrison Holzer; Shelley Hennig; Teyana Taylor; Jamie Choi; Jordan Rock; Amin Joseph; Andy Buckley; Blair Underwood; Kid Cudi
- Music by: Raphael Saadiq
- Distributed by: Netflix
- Release date: 2018
- Running time: 120 minutes
- Country: United States
- Language: English

The After Party is a 2018 comedy film written and directed by Ian Edelman. The film stars Kyle Harvey, Harrison Holzer, Shelley Hennig, Teyana Taylor, Jordan Rock, Amin Joseph, Andy Buckley, Blair Underwood and Scott Mescudi, also featuring several cameos.

The film was released on August 24, 2018, by Netflix to negative reviews from critics.

== Plot ==
Aspiring rapper Owen Ellison and his manager/childhood friend Jeff Levine find Rahmel in a bathroom stall and rap for him, hoping for a record deal. The person in the bathroom stall turns out to be not Rahmel but his intern, Bernard. Jeff convinces him to get Rahmel to come to their next show in exchange for producer credit on a future album.

When coming home from high school, Owen runs into Jeff's sister Alicia, whom he's been in love with for years, and invites her to his next show. Jeff also invites his father to it, who tells him he needs to focus more when he gets to Harvard. Owen talks to his father backstage before going on stage to calm his nerves. When Jeff sees this he tells Owen that he wishes his own father would be more supportive.

Owen and Jeff run into a man named William, who says he is a music critic. William and Owen become best friends, and William helps Owen produce his first song called "How It Feels to be Lonely", which he gets most hate for. William goes to Downstate High School and meets Jeff. Jeff tells William that he is a “fake student”, saying that he actually attends Bluefin High School.

They meet Bernard, an intern at Atlantic Records, who brings Wiz Khalifa instead of Rahmel. They smoke weed with Wiz before Owen performs onstage. He starts performing well, but throws up on Wiz and has a seizure. The video of Owen's seizure goes viral and is called "Seezjah Boy". Believing his chance at success in the music business is over, he decides to join the Marines.

Jeff makes Owen promise that if he gets him a record deal by Friday, he won't give up and enlist. He then goes to many record labels on Wednesday, but they all say Owen is dead due to "Seezjah Boy". On the street, Owen is embarrassingly constantly recognized.

On Thursday morning, Jeff's persistence pays off, and Jessica at Atlantic gives him an invite to have a quick word with Rahmel at the secret French Montana show that night. Jeff enlists Alicia's help to get Owen there. In the end Bernard gets them in. Alicia gets pulled on stage, later enabling them access to the After Party.

Their crazy night out continues, as Owen and Jeff haven't brought attractive women with them. Eventually they get three strippers to accompany them, but Jeff's dad's Rolls is damaged in the process. Getting in, they discover they need to go to the After After Party, only they arrive so late they miss both Alicia and Rahmel. Jeff and Owen argue, blaming each other for missing their chance. But Owen one-ups him with a mega dissing rap, destroying him.

A few minutes later, Owen helps Jeff when a fight breaks out; afterwards, the friends make up. Bernard gives them Rahmel's address so he has one more chance to rap for him. They go up the fire escape and get maced.

Arriving home in the morning, Owen's dad warns him they're leaving in a moment, then heads out. As Jeff is finally having a heart-to-heart with his dad, his phone blows up. The rap and fight went viral, and everyone wants to sign Owen. When he hears this, he rethinks this decision, finding it in him to chase his dream one last time.

In the closing scene, we see Owen has become a success with Jeff managing him at his side.

== Cast ==
- Kyle Harvey as Owen Ellison, an aspiring rapper
- Harrison Holzer as Jeff Levine, Owen's best friend and manager
- Shelley Hennig as Alicia Levine, Jeff's older sister and Owen's love interest
- Jamie Choi as Jessica, a major record label executive assistant
- Teyana Taylor as Bl'Asia, a stripper whom Jeff is attracted to
- Jordan Rock as Bernard, Rahmel's unpaid intern
- Amin Joseph as Leon, Bl'Asia's stalker ex
- Andy Buckley as Mr. Levine, Jeff and Alicia's father
- Blair Underwood as Sergeant Martin Ellison, Owen's father
- Scott Mescudi as William, Owen's manager and Jeff's high school teacher

Several celebrities have cameo appearances, including Dinah Jane, Wiz Khalifa, Charlamagne tha God, French Montana, DJ Khaled, Ski Mask the Slump God, Desiigner, Pusha T, Jadakiss, DMX, Tee Grizzley, Young M.A, A Boogie wit da Hoodie, and Eddie Huang.

== Production ==
In September 2017, it was announced that Ian Edelman would write and direct The After Party for Netflix. Kyle Harvey, Harrison Holzer, Shelley Hennig, Teyana Taylor, Jordan Rock, Amin Joseph, Andy Buckley, and Blair Underwood joined the cast of the film.

Principal photography began in September 2017. Filming was scheduled to last six weeks at locations in New York including The Meadows Music & Arts Festival and the Gramercy Theatre.

== Release ==
The film was released on August 24, 2018, for Netflix. In 2024, Kid Cudi released a single titled "Dreams I See" for his comic series Moon Man, which Cudi dedicated to the film.

== Reception ==
=== Critical response ===
The After Party received largely negative reviews from critics, and holds a 0% approval rating on Rotten Tomatoes based on 5 critic reviews, with an average rating of 3.90/10.
