= Sugar and Toys =

- Created by: Brian Ash; Carl Jones
- Starring: Kyle
- Voices of: Carl Jones; J.D. Witherspoon; Nick Hudson Murdoch
- Country of origin: United States
- Original language: English
- No. of seasons: 2
- No. of episodes: 16

Production
- Executive producers: Brian Ash; Carl Jones; Aengus James; Colin King Miller; Jordan Allen-Dutton; Kyle Harvey
- Running time: 22 minutes
- Production companies: This is Just a Test; 245 Enterprises

Original release
- Network: Fuse
- Release: June 9, 2019 – October 25, 2020

Sugar and Toys is an American animated/live-action television series produced by Fuse and premiered on June 9, 2019.

On April 9, 2020, the series was renewed for a second season of six episodes. The second season premiered on September 20, 2020.

== Plot ==
The series follows an assortment of animated shorts based on children's programming, with live-action segments featuring Kyle.

== Characters and recurring segments ==
=== Live-action ===
==== Kyle's Living Room ====
These segments feature Kyle in his living room, occasionally with a guest (mostly Dumbfoundead and Jalen) doing something related to the episodes' title.

==== Commercials ====
Each episode of the series a fake commercial advertising board games, cereals, dolls and more. Each fake commercial feature kids.

=== Animated ===
==== Ye, Yeezy and Yeezus ====
These shorts feature three different versions of Kanye West.

==== The Lost Dreamers ====
These shorts feature a Mexican-American family who is transported back to the ancient San Bernardino and must find a way back.

==== Drizzy ====
Shorts featuring an animated version of Drake.

==== The Lil's ====
"Lil" versions of Lil Baby, Lil Pump, Lil Uzi Vert, Lil Xan, Lil Wayne, and Lil Yachty must escape from a kids' bedroom after being shrunk down to doll size.

==== Clue's Clues ====
Shorts revolving Blue's Clues characters Steve and Blue, as if they were Crips.

== Production ==
The series was picked up on December 11, 2018 by Fuse.

== Episodes ==
=== Series overview ===
| Season | Episodes | Originally released | |
| Season | Episodes | First released | Last released |
|---|---|---|---|
| 1 | 10 | June 9, 2019 | August 11, 2019 |
| 2 | 6 | September 20, 2020 | October 25, 2020 |

=== Season 1 (2019) ===
| No. overall | No. in season | Title | Written by | Storyboarded by | Original release date | Prod. code | U.S. viewers (millions) |
|---|---|---|---|---|---|---|---|
| 1 | 1 | "Woke Tarts" | Unknown | TBA | June 9, 2019 | 101 | N/A |
| 2 | 2 | "The Every Damn Internet Challenge Challenge" | Unknown | TBA | June 16, 2019 | 102 | N/A |
| 3 | 3 | "Cribfest" | Unknown | TBA | June 23, 2019 | 103 | N/A |
| 4 | 4 | "It's Hard to Raise Yourself These Days" | Unknown | TBA | June 30, 2019 | 104 | N/A |
| 5 | 5 | "Burning Scouts" | Unknown | TBA | July 7, 2019 | 105 | N/A |
| 6 | 6 | "Devicive" | Unknown | TBA | July 14, 2019 | 106 | N/A |
| 7 | 7 | "Verified" | Unknown | TBA | July 21, 2019 | 107 | N/A |
| 8 | 8 | "SandT" | Unknown | TBA | July 28, 2019 | 108 | N/A |
| 9 | 9 | "Make Room for Roomie" | Unknown | TBA | August 4, 2019 | 109 | N/A |
| 10 | 10 | "In Memory of Mascot Man" | Unknown | TBA | August 11, 2019 | 110 | N/A |

=== Season 2 (2020) ===
In April 2020, the series was renewed for a second season of six episodes. It premiered on September 20, 2020.

| No. overall | No. in season | Title | Written by | Storyboarded by | Original release date | Prod. code | U.S. viewers (millions) |
|---|---|---|---|---|---|---|---|
| 11 | 1 | "Thirst Day Was the Worst Day" | Unknown | TBA | September 20, 2020 | 201 | N/A |
| 12 | 2 | "Rebooty Call" | Unknown | TBA | September 27, 2020 | 202 | N/A |
| 13 | 3 | "Plenty of Fish in The Street" | Unknown | TBA | October 4, 2020 | 203 | N/A |
| 14 | 4 | "Making the Retograde" | Unknown | TBA | October 11, 2020 | 204 | N/A |
| 15 | 5 | "Revenge of the Nerfs" | Unknown | TBA | October 18, 2020 | 205 | N/A |
| 16 | 6 | "Love in the Time of Pandademic" | Unknown | TBA | October 25, 2020 | 206 | N/A |

== Broadcast ==
The series airs Sundays at 11pm ET/8pm PT on Fuse.

The series is available for streaming on Amazon Prime Video and Tubi.
