= See You When I Am Famous =

Studio album by Kyle
- Released: July 17, 2020
- Length: 31:46
- Label: Atlantic
- Producer: Aaron Vigil; Axl Folie; Cassio; The Drums; Happy Perez; Hit-Boy; James Wrighter; JoogFTR; Mick Schultz; naz; Raphael Saadiq; SoFly and Nius; Sunny Norway; William Binderup

Kyle chronology
Light of Mine (2018)	See You When I Am Famous (2020)	It's Not So Bad (2022)

Singles from See You When I Am Famous
- 1. "Yes!" Released: February 21, 2020; 2. "What It Is" Released: May 18, 2020; 3. "Bouncin" Released: June 19, 2020; 4. "Money Now" Released: July 15, 2020

See You When I Am Famous (stylized as See You When I Am Famous!!!!!!!!!!!!) is the second studio album by American rapper and singer Kyle, released on July 17, 2020 by Atlantic Records. It follows the release of his 2018 debut record Light of Mine. The album was produced by Hit-Boy, Mick Schultz, SoFly and Nius, and Raphael Saadiq; with guest appearances from Tyga, Rico Nasty, Rich the Kid, K Camp, Trippie Redd, Iann Dior, The Drums, Bryson Tiller and Too Short. See You When I Am Famous!!!!!!!!!!!! debuted and peaked at number 124 on the Billboard 200 and spawned four singles: "Yes!", "What It Is", "Bouncin", and "Money Now".

== Critical reception ==
Professional ratings
Review scores
Source	Rating
AllMusic	3.5/5 stars
The Post	2.5/5

Aaron Williams of Uproxx wrote that: "See You When I Am Famous!!!!!!!!!!!! isn't about shining on haters, or proving how tough Kyle can be. Instead, it's a call to action, an affirmation. Kyle isn't stunting out of spite, but to show that anyone can be a star, so long as they remain true to themselves and pursue what they love with determination, dedication, passion, and joy. It's about naming your dream, then claiming it, taking that moment to savor it — then becoming an example for the next generation to keep chasing their own." Neil Z. Yeung of AllMusic noted how the album reconnects with the K.I.D. persona by utilizing "languid bars and smooth sung vocals over fun and carefree production", concluding that: "Kyle offers an ideal sonic middle ground, delivering on the initial declaration of See You When I Am Famous!!!!!!!!!!!! by honoring his past and celebrating his position in the game in 2020." Joey Perkins of The Post felt that Kyle was caught between "sounding genuine and making another hit" throughout the record, saying it falters when attempting to recapture the Beautiful Loser style but praised the more contemplative tracks like "Over It" and "Bye", concluding that: "[W]ith a combination of "iSpy" imposters, tracks that are reminiscent of the younger KYLE and songs that sound more thoughtful and sincere, See You When I Am Famous!!!!!!!!!!!! is a very hit-or-miss project."

== Track listing ==
Credits adapted from Tidal.

See You When I Am Famous track listing
No.	Title	Writer(s)	Producer(s)	Length
1.	"Bouncin"	Kyle Harvey; Chauncey Hollis	Hit-Boy	3:44
2.	"Money Now" (featuring Tyga and Johnny Yukon)	Harvey; Michael Stevenson; John Mitchell; Raphaël Judrin; Pierre-Antoine Melki; Cassio Bouziane Lopes; Joshua Portillo	Cassio; SoFly and Nius; naz	2:39
3.	"Girls" (featuring Rico Nasty)	Harvey; Maria Kelly; Jamahal Oslay; Joshua Portillo; Rick Rubin; Adam Horovitz	Sunny Norway; naz	2:24
4.	"Yes!" (featuring Rich the Kid and K Camp)	Harvey; Dimitri Roger; Kristopher Campbell	Aaron Vigil; James Wrighter; Jonathan Pierce; naz	3:14
5.	"Forget" (featuring Trippie Redd, Iann Dior and The Drums)	Harvey; Michael White IV; Michael Ian Olmo; Joshua Portillo; Jamahal Osley; Jonathan Pierce	Sunny Norway; The Drums; naz	3:04
6.	"Over It"	Harvey; Nathan Perez; Joshua Portillo	Happy Perez; naz	2:23
7.	"What It Is"	Harvey; Schultz	Mick Schultz	2:23
8.	"The Sun" (featuring Bryson Tiller and Raphael Saadiq)	Harvey; Tiller; Saadiq; Portillo	Saadiq; naz	2:37
9.	"Bye"	Harvey; Axel Morgan; Jonathan Pierce; Erez Sivan	Axl Folie; The Drums	3:38
10.	"A Message from Mr. Man (Interlude)"	William Binderup; Charles P. Anderson	William Binderup	0:54
11.	"Mr. Man & K.i.D"	Harvey; Charles P. Anderson; Jonathan Pierce; Jamahal Osley	Sunny Norway; The Drums	2:10
12.	"See You When I'm Famous" (featuring AzChike and Too Short)	Harvey; Damaria K. Walker; Todd Shaw; Terrence Hackett	JoogFTR	2:36
Total length:				31:46

== Charts ==
Chart performance for See You When I Am Famous
Chart (2020)	Peak position
US Billboard 200	124
