= Light of Mine =

Studio album by Kyle
- Released: May 18, 2018
- Genre: Pop-rap
- Length: 50:58
- Label: Indie-Pop; Atlantic
- Producer: Austin Sexton; AxlFolie; Beni Haze; Billboard; BOSSMAN; Charlie Handsome; Deffie; Jake Troth; Jordan Reyes; Lege Kale; M-Phazes; Monte Booker; naz.; Ricci Riera; Sunny Norway; superduperbrick; 10A

Kyle chronology
| Smyle (2015) | Light of Mine (2018) | See You When I Am Famous (2020) |

Singles from Light of Mine
- 1. "iSpy" Released: December 2, 2016; 2. "To the Moon" Released: March 9, 2018; 3. "Playinwitme" Released: March 20, 2018; 4. "Ikuyo" Released: May 10, 2018; 5. "Moment" Released: August 24, 2018; 6. "SuperDuperKyle" Released: September 21, 2018; 7. "Hey Julie!" Released: November 29, 2018; 8. "F You I Love You" Released: August 23, 2019

Light of Mine is the debut studio album by American rapper and singer Kyle. It was released on May 18, 2018, by Independently Popular and Atlantic Records. The album features guest appearances from Kehlani, 2 Chainz, Sophia Black, Khalid, Take 6, Avery Wilson, Lil Yachty and Alessia Cara. The album was supported by four singles; "iSpy", "To the Moon", "Playinwitme" and “Ikuyo". A deluxe version of the album was released on August 23, 2019. It features three previously released singles: "Moment" featuring Wiz Khalifa, "SuperDuperKyle" featuring MadeinTYO, "Hey Julie!" featuring Lil Yachty, and most recently released single "F You I Love You" featuring Teyana Taylor, along with two new songs.

== Artwork ==
The cover art was designed by SuperDuperBrick and James McCloud, who previously collaborated on the art for Kehlani’s debut album SweetSexySavage.

== Critical reception ==
Professional ratings
Review scores
| Source | Rating |
|---|---|
| Highsnobiety | 3.5/5 |
| HipHopDX | 3.8/5 |
| NME | 4/5 stars |
| Pitchfork | 6.9/10 |
| Vice (Expert Witness) | (3-star Honorable Mention) |

Light of Mine received favorable positive reviews from music critics. At Album of the Year, which assigns a normalized rating out of 100 to reviews from mainstream critics, the album received an average score of 75 based on five reviews.

In his review for Highsnobiety, Russell Dean Stone wrote that "At best, you could say that Light of Mine is optimism as cultural rebellion – at worst, it plays things too safe in an attempt to be liked by everyone (in Kyle’s defense, at least it doesn’t feel he’s ever trying to be anything he’s not)". In Vice, Robert Christgau summed it up as the "best innocent act in r&b, with girlish female cameos nailing two fetching numbers", naming "Ikuyo" and "Games" as highlights.

== Commercial performance ==
Light of Mine debuted at number 29 on the Billboard 200, selling 17,000 album-equivalent units and 2,000 pure album sales in its first week. The album was certified gold by the Recording Industry Association of America (RIAA) for combined sales and album-equivalent units of over 500,000 copies in the United States. It was also certified gold in Canada.

== Track listing ==
Standard edition
| No. | Title | Writer(s) | Producer(s) | Length |
|---|---|---|---|---|
| 1. | "Ups & Downs" | Kyle Harvey; Mark Landon; Luke Liang | M-Phazes | 4:44 |
| 2. | "Coming, Going?" (featuring Take 6) | Harvey; Ricci Riera; Matthew Alexander; Joshua Portillo; Aaron Michael Vigil; Lawrence Ross | Ricci Riera | 1:57 |
| 3. | "Zoom" | Harvey; Benjamin Perkins Hazlegrove; Dana Lorenzo Everett II; Michael Mario Perry | Beni Haze; Deffie | 2:46 |
| 4. | "Ikuyo" (featuring 2 Chainz and Sophia Black) | Harvey; Tauheed Epps; Sophia Black; Alexander; Portillo | BOSSMAN; naz. | 3:41 |
| 5. | "Games" | Harvey; Black; Alexander; Portillo | BOSSMAN; naz. | 2:19 |
| 6. | "Babies" (featuring Alessia Cara) | Harvey; Alessia Caracciolo; Axel Morgan; Portillo; Landon; Aaron Vigil | M-Phazes; AxlFolie; naz. | 4:00 |
| 7. | "OpenDoors" (featuring Avery Wilson) | Harvey; Jordan Reyes | Jordan Reyes | 5:03 |
| 8. | "To the Moon" | Harvey; Austin Sexton; Jamahal Osley; Justin Howze | Sunny Norway; Austin Sexton | 2:51 |
| 9. | "Playinwitme" (featuring Kehlani) | Harvey; Kehlani Parrish; Jake Troth; Portillo; Howze | Jake Troth; naz.; superduperbrick | 3:11 |
| 10. | "iMissMe" (featuring Khalid) | Harvey; Mathieu Jomphe Lépine; Khalid Robinson; Landon; Portillo; Vigil; Black | M-Phazes; naz.; Billboard | 3:09 |
| 11. | "ShipTrip" | Harvey; Ahmanti Clifton Booker; Landon | M-Phazes; Monte Booker | 2:55 |
| 12. | "Rodeo" | Harvey; Landon; Tenei Hapurona; Howze | 10A; M-Phazes | 3:54 |
| 13. | "It's Yours" | Harvey; Landon | M-Phazes | 4:11 |
| 14. | "Clouds" | Harvey; Landon; Ryan Vojtesak; Keenan Davis | Charlie Handsome; M-Phazes | 2:05 |
| 15. | "iSpy" (featuring Lil Yachty) | Harvey; Miles McCollum; Portillo; Howze; Malik Keith | naz.; Lege Kale | 4:12 |
| Total length: | | | | 50:58 |

Deluxe edition bonus tracks
| No. | Title | Writer(s) | Producer(s) | Length |
|---|---|---|---|---|
| 16. | "F You I Love You" (featuring Teyana Taylor) | | M-Phazes | 3:56 |
| 17. | "Hey Julie!" (featuring Lil Yachty) | Harvey; McCollum; Maurice Powell; Howze; Ray Jacobs; Portillo | naz.; superduperbrick | 2:36 |
| 18. | "Mmmm" | | | 2:48 |
| 19. | "SuperDuperKyle" (featuring MadeinTYO) | Harvey; Malcolm Davis; Ronald Spence, Jr. | Ronny J | 2:49 |
| 20. | "Moment" (featuring Wiz Khalifa) | Harvey; Thomaz; Landon; Dacoury Natche | DJ Dahi; M-Phazes | 3:08 |
| 21. | "Kyoto" | | | 3:06 |

Sample credits

- "Ups & Downs" contains an interpolation of "Just What I Am", as performed by Kid Cudi featuring King Chip.

== Charts ==
| Chart (2018) | Peak position |
|---|---|
| Canadian Albums (Billboard) | 33 |
| Dutch Albums (Album Top 100) | 144 |
| US Billboard 200 | 29 |
| US Top R&B/Hip-Hop Albums (Billboard) | 16 |

== Certifications ==
| Region | Certification | Certified units/sales |
|---|---|---|
| Canada (Music Canada) | Gold | 40,000^{‡} |
| United States (RIAA) | Platinum | 1,000,000^{‡} |
^{‡} Sales+streaming figures based on certification alone.

== Release history ==
| Region | Date | Format | Label | Ref. |
|---|---|---|---|---|
| Various | May 18, 2018 | Digital download; streaming | Atlantic | |
| Various | July 20, 2018 | CD | Atlantic | |
| Various | October 19, 2018 | Vinyl | Atlantic | |
