= Heartbreak Town (album) =

Studio album by Steve Azar
- Released: February 27, 1996
- Studios: River North Studios (Chicago, IL); Emerald Studios, Masterfonics, Sound Stage, Sound Kitchen; Woodland Studios (Nashville, TN)
- Genre: Country
- Length: 43:08
- Label: River North Nashville
- Producers: Joe Thomas; Steve Azar; A. J. Masters

Steve Azar chronology
Heartbreak Town (1996)	Waitin' on Joe (2002)

Singles from Heartbreak Town
- 1. "Someday" Released: February 19, 1996; 2. "I Never Stopped Lovin' You" Released: June 10, 1996; 3. "Nights Like This" Released: September 30, 1996

Heartbreak Town is the debut studio album by American country music artist Steve Azar, released on February 27, 1996 via River North Nashville. It was produced by Joe Thomas, Azar, and A. J. Masters, with Azar co-writing all but the cover song "I Go Crazy", originally a hit single for Paul Davis in 1978. Azar would later depart from River North Nashville and would not release another album until Waitin' on Joe in 2002, by which he had signed to Mercury Nashville Records.

The album proved to be a commercial failure and received mixed critical reception among critics; Azar later regretted the album. Three singles in total were released, the highest charting being "I Never Stopped Lovin' You", which hit number 50 on the US Hot Country Singles & Tracks chart.

== Singles ==
"Someday" was serviced as the album's lead single on February 19, 1996, and functioned as Azar's debut single. It received a positive review from Deborah Evans Price of Billboard magazine, saying he "demonstrates sharp songwriting skills and a strong voice that should make him a favorite with country radio programmers and listeners." Its music video was released to CMT's playlists for the week of January 28, 1996. The track debuted on the US Billboard Hot Country Songs chart the week of March 16, 1996, at number 67, becoming the "Hot Shot Debut" of the week. The track would hit its peak position of number 51 the week of May 4, 1996, spending 10 weeks in total on the chart. It also became Azar's only charting single in Canada, peaking at number 65 on the Canada RPM Country Tracks chart. On Radio & Records's country airplay chart, the track hit number 42.

The album's second single, "I Never Stopped Lovin' You", was released on June 10, 1996, its video being released to CMT's playlists for the week of May 19, 1996. The video was directed by Chris Rogers and filmed in Nashville, Tennessee. The track debuted on the US Billboard Hot Country Songs chart the week of July 6, 1996, at number 75. It reached a peak position of number 50 on the chart the week of August 24, 1996, becoming his first top-fifty entry; it spent 14 weeks in total on the chart. On Radio & Records, the track reached number 42.

The third and final single, "Nights Like This", was released on September 30, 1996. It was later released for the adult contemporary market. Larry Flick of Billboard gave it a positive review, saying Azar "performs the song in a gruff, worldly voice that keeps it from getting too sappy or sweet," and that "listeners who can't get enough of Bob Carlisle's current smash will find this absolutely irresistible." It failed to enter any charts.

== Critical reception ==
Country Standard Time critic Larry Stephens gave a mostly-negative review, saying that outside "Thunderbird" and "As Long as Harley Gets to Play," the album's songs were too similar to each other in sound and "not strong enough to carry [their] weight on radio." Billboard was more positive, with an uncredited review calling Azar's songwriting "adept", while comparing his voice favorably to John Mellencamp. Azar later disowned the album, saying in a 2003 interview quote, "didn't even sound like [him]".

== Track listing ==
All tracks produced by Joe Thomas except "You Don't Even Have to Try", produced by Steve Azar and A. J. Masters.

Heartbreak Town track listing
No.	Title	Writer(s)	Length
1.	"I Never Stopped Lovin' You"	Steve Azar; Jason Blume	4:10
2.	"Nights Like This"	Azar; Bob Regan	3:32
3.	"What Are We Waitin' For"	Azar; Roger Murrah; A. J. Masters	2:43
4.	"Someday"	Azar; Masters; Regan	3:06
5.	"Thunderbird"	Azar; Masters; Tommy Rocco	4:54
6.	"As Long as Harley Gets to Play"	Azar; Masters; Murrah	3:50
7.	"Dreams of a Dancer"	Azar; Masters; Murrah	3:11
8.	"Heartbreak Town"	Azar; Murrah; Regan	3:08
9.	"I Go Crazy"	Paul Davis	3:51
10.	"Caught Between the Rock and the Roll"	Azar; Masters; Don Goodman	4:15
11.	"Love Had No Right"	Azar; Masters; Tony Marty	3:20
12.	"You Don't Even Have to Try"	Azar; Masters; Murrah	3:03
Total length:			43:08

== Personnel ==
As listed in liner notes.

- Steve Azar – lead vocals, background vocals, acoustic guitar
- Eddie Bayers – drums
- Michael Black – background vocals
- Kathy Burdick – background vocals
- Glen Duncan – acoustic guitar
- Larry Franklin – fiddle
- Sonny Garrish – pedal steel guitar
- Greg Leisz – electric guitar, lap steel guitar, pedal steel guitar
- Brent Mason – electric guitar
- A. J. Masters – acoustic guitar, bass guitar, background vocals
- Matthew Morse – strings
- Steve Nathan – piano, Hammond B-3 organ
- Johnny Neel – piano
- Russ Pahl – pedal steel guitar
- Gary Pigg – background vocals
- Bob Regan – electric guitar
- Michael Rhodes – bass guitar
- Brent Rowan – acoustic guitar, electric guitar
- John Wesley Ryles – background vocals
- Joe Thomas – acoustic guitar, piano
- Jonathan Yudkin – fiddle
