= Waitin' on Joe (song) =

Single by Steve Azar

from the album Waitin' on Joe
- Released: August 3, 2002
- Genre: Country
- Length: 4:19
- Label: Mercury Nashville
- Songwriter: Steve Azar
- Producer: Rafe Van Hoy

Steve Azar singles chronology
"I Don't Have to Be Me ('til Monday)" (2001)	"Waitin' on Joe" (2002)	"Doin' It Right" (2005)

"Waitin' on Joe" is a song written and recorded by American country music singer Steve Azar. It was released in August 2002 as the second single and title track from the album Waitin' on Joe. The song reached #28 on the Billboard Hot Country Singles & Tracks chart.

== Music video ==
A music video was released and featured Morgan Freeman.

Freeman narrates at the beginning and goes to Azar, who is getting ready to head to work on a ship along the Mississippi Delta and by the time he arrives at the dock, he finds out that Joe hasn't arrived yet and goes around the town asking the residents if they have seen him, which to no avail.

While at the coffee shop, a resident alerts the town that Joe was killed in an accident with an oncoming train, which shocks Azar. The video cuts to Azar and the town's residents at Joe's funeral and Azar later returns to his job on the riverboat.

The video concludes with Freeman doing a short narration.

== Chart performance ==
Chart (2002)	Peak position
US Hot Country Songs (Billboard)	28
