= Daryl Hawk =

American photographer

Daryl Hawk is a documentary photographer. Hawk travels to some of the most remote places around the world taking photographs for magazines and presentations. He spends weeks at a time documenting the different cultures and landscapes. He has appeared on the "Today Show" showing his work. Daryl Hawk is a member of the Explorers Club based out of New York City as well as the Royal Geographical Society and the Professional Photographers Association. Hawk has carried the Explorers Club flag to Bhutan which is one of the club's greatest privileges. According to the club's Web site, "A flag expedition must further the cause of exploration and field science."

Hawk hosted and produced a Cablevision TV Show called "The Unconventional Traveler," interviewing over 100 of the world's most renowned explorers, adventurers, scientists and filmmakers. Guests on his show have included Buzz Aldrin, Jane Goodall, Reinhold Messner and George Schaller. He also gives presentations across the country speaking of topics ranging from corporate ideas to photography. He has published six hardcover photography books, "Distant Journeys," "Quiet Moments," "White Pond," Manhattan," "Into the Heart of Cuba," and "Mountains Beyond Mountains."

He is the founder and owner of "Unconventional Travelers," a personalized tour company that focuses on inspiring travelers to see the world by experiencing first-hand other cultures and lifestyles.
