= Sunshine (magazine) =

- August and September 1944 issues
- Editor: Henry F. Henrichs
- Categories: General Interest Digests
- Frequency: Monthly
- Publisher: Sunshine Press
- First issue: January 1924
- Final issue: 1992
- Company: House of Sunshine
- Country: USA
- Based in: Litchfield, Illinois
- Language: English

Sunshine was a "feel good" monthly digest, filled with uplifting short articles and anecdotes. It was in circulation between 1924 and 1992.

== Overview ==
Sunshine was first published in January 1924. The magazine was subtitled A Soulful Magazet. The issues were purposefully slim, often just 42 pages long, including the back cover, with short quick-to-read articles. Each page was filled with warm anecdotes and advice.

Inside the front cover of many issues was an appeal on behalf of the Sunshine Magazet Circle of Great Britain, an organization that distributed issues of Sunshine to "hospitals, old folks homes [sic], holiday guest centers, etc." It was a volunteer operation and readers were encouraged to buy an extra subscription for the use of that organization.

Gospel singer Rosa Page Welch said that there were three things she saw everywhere in her world travels, Coca-Cola, Standard Oil and Sunshine magazine.

Published on Route 66 in Litchfield, Illinois, it was distributed worldwide. In the 1990s the magazine was published by Henrichs Publishing Inc. It ceased publication in 1992.

== Religion ==
Many librarians grouped the title with religious titles, but it contained no overt proselytism. Inside the front cover is the disclaimer "Sunshine Magazine is not the instrument of any organizations or doctrine. In an Independent stature, its sole interest is to serve its readers."

Although nonsectarian, Sunshine did not shy away from religious topics, generally slanted toward Christianity. The Volumes of Sunshine offered for sale were suggested as gifts to clergymen, as well as social workers, teachers, speakers and radio broadcasters.

== Good news ==
Printed inside the front cover was the assertion: "A little magazine of uplifting stories and anecdotes to cheer people up." It was similar in format to Reader's Digest and Coronet. Its stories were, however, much shorter. Examples of its content include:

- "How to Be a Hero", Irving Leibowitz
- "Frosting on the Cake," a periodic feature featuring five bullet points asserting the use of common sense

== Volumes of Sunshine ==
Volume of Sunshine

Annual editions of bound monthly issues were sold under the name "(Year) Volume of Sunshine" (e.g. "1963 Volume of "Sunshine). The annual volumes began with a comprehensive index of key topics, a section of the poetry included, and an author index.

Alternatively, one could buy a "best of" edition called a Book of Sunshine, 32-page, edited editions, culled from multiple editions of the slightly larger monthly magazine.

== Legacy ==
Sunshine was touted as a good place for new writers to get published. The headquarters building, House of Sunshine, was later renamed Sunshine Park.

== See also ==
- Coronet
- Pageant
- Reader's Digest
