= Waitin' on Joe =

Waitin' On Joe

Studio album by Steve Azar
- Released: April 16, 2002
- Genre: Country
- Length: 43:17
- Label: Mercury Nashville
- Producer: Rafe Van Hoy

Steve Azar chronology
Heartbreak Town (1996)	Waitin' On Joe (2002)	Indianola (2008)

Singles from Massari
- 1. "I Don't Have to Be Me ('til Monday)" Released: October 1, 2001; 2. "Waitin' on Joe" Released: August 3, 2002

Waitin' on Joe is the second studio album by American country music artist Steve Azar. It was released in 2002 on Mercury Nashville Records as the second album of his career, six years after his debut album Heartbreak Town. Waitin' on Joe features the singles "I Don't Have to be Me ('Til Monday)" and the title track "Waitin' on Joe". The former was Azar's biggest hit, reaching number 2 on the Billboard Hot Country Songs charts and number 35 on the Billboard Hot 100, making it his most successful single to date, while the title track peaked at number 28 on the country charts.

== Critical reception ==
Brian O'Neill of Allmusic gave the album two stars out of five, saying that while Azar "even bucked industry trends by writing, alone or in collaborations, everything" on the album, but called the songs "a paint-by-numbers pandering to the prevalent country radio contingency." Country Standard Time reviewer Jeffrey B. Remz was more favorable, saying, "This is not a perfect album — a bit too contemporary sounding musically, but there's enough here to alleviate waitin' on Azar."

Azar released another single for Mercury in 2005, entitled "Doin' It Right", and after this single failed to reach Top 40 on the country charts. He exited the label in favor of Midas Records Nashville, charting one single for that label but not releasing an album for that label. A third album, Indianola, was finally released in May 2008 on his own label.

== Track listing ==
No.	Title	Writer(s)	Length
1.	"I Don't Have to Be Me ('til Monday)"	Steve Azar; Jason Young; R.C. Bannon	3:16
2.	"How Long is This Time Gonna Be"	Azar; Rafe Van Hoy	4:05
3.	"Damn the Money"	Azar; Van Hoy; Stacy Beyer	3:26
4.	"Waitin' on Joe"	Azar	4:19
5.	"My Heart Wants to Run"	Azar	4:03
6.	"The Underdog"	Azar; Van Hoy	3:51
7.	"One Good Reason Why"	Azar; Van Hoy	3:17
8.	"Lay Your Heart Next to Mine"	Azar; Van Hoy	3:56
9.	"Goin' to Beat the Devil (To See My Angel Tonight)"	Azar; A. J. Masters; Johnny Douglas	2:56
10.	"You Don't Know How It Feels"	Azar; Van Hoy	4:20
11.	"River's on the Rise"	Roger Murrah; Mark Paul; Azar	5:48

== Personnel ==
- David Angell - violin
- Steve Azar - lead vocals, background vocals
- Terry Brock - background vocals
- John Catchings - string arrangements, cello
- David Davidson - violin
- Dan Harris - slide guitar
- Chris Kent - bass guitar
- Sonny Landreth - electric guitar, slide guitar
- Luke Mason - drums, percussion, background vocals
- Gary Morse - steel guitar, Weissenborn
- Pamela Sixfin - violin
- Tania Smith - keyboards, strings
- Rafe Van Hoy - bass guitar, acoustic guitar, electric guitar
- Kristin Wilkinson - viola
- Jason Young - harmonica, background vocals
- Jonathan Yudkin - mandolin

== Chart performance ==
Chart (2002)	Peak position
U.S. Billboard Top Country Albums	29
U.S. Billboard Top Heatseekers	31
