= Kyle (musician) =

American rapper from California

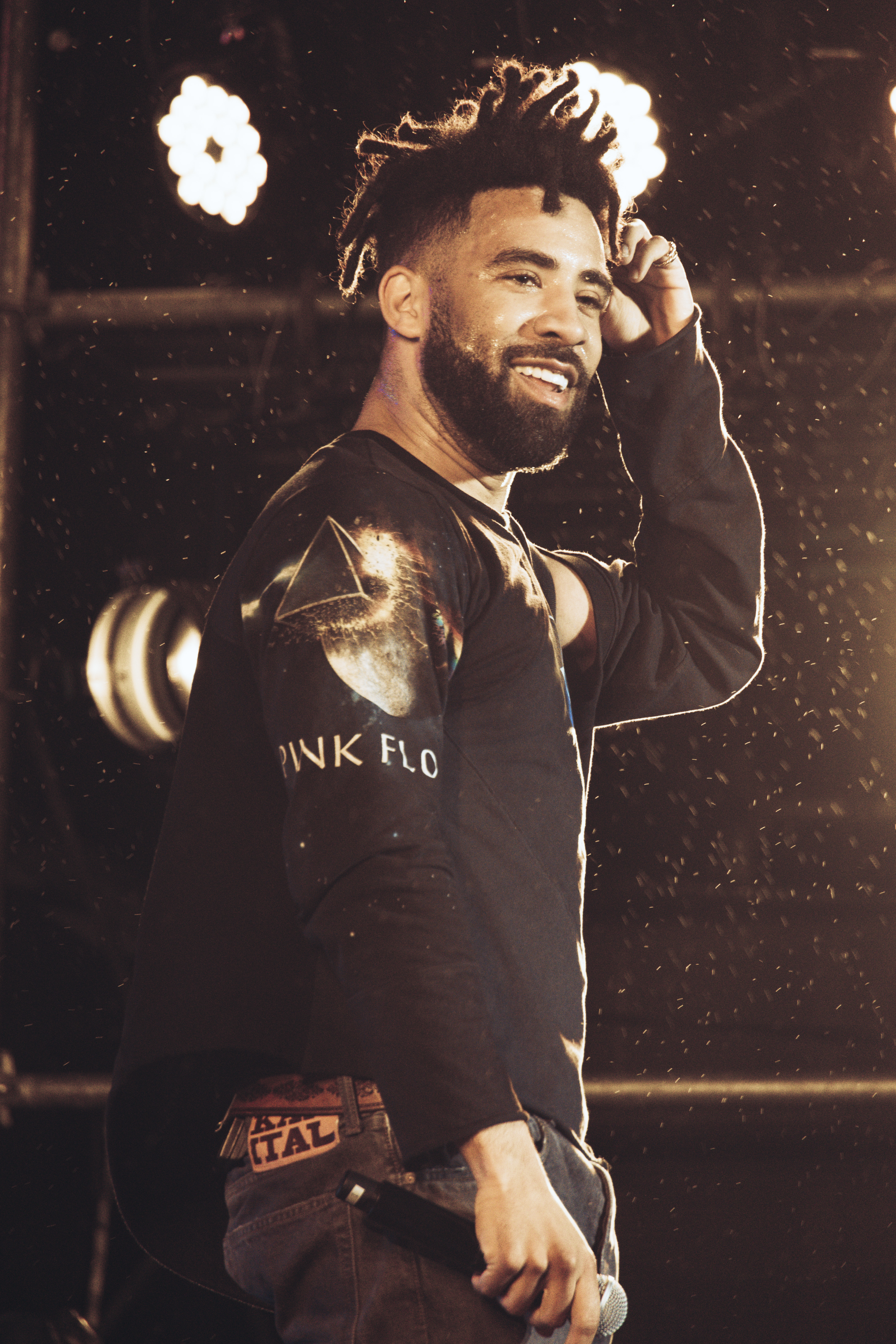
- Kyle performing in 2024

Background information
- Also known as: K.i.D; SuperDuperKyle; lovekyle; King Wavy; Kidd Kash; Fire Spittin' Kitten
- Born: Kyle Thomas Harvey; May 18, 1993 (age 33); Los Angeles, California, U.S.
- Origin: Ventura, California, U.S.
- Genre: Pop rap
- Occupations: Rapper; singer; songwriter; actor
- Years active: 2009–present
- Labels: Indie-Pop; Atlantic; Universal; Warner; APG
- Website: superduperkyle.com

Kyle Thomas Harvey (born May 18, 1993), known mononymously as Kyle (stylized in all caps) and SuperDuperKyle (formerly known as K.i.D, an acronym for Kyle is Determined), is an American rapper, singer, songwriter, and actor from Ventura, California. He is best known for his 2016 breakout single "iSpy" (featuring Lil Yachty), which peaked at number 4 on the Billboard Hot 100. Signed to Indie-Pop and Atlantic Records, Harvey is also known for his association with the SuperDuperCrew which consists of Brick, Jesus, and Maxx.

Harvey has collaborated with artists such as Waywo, Kehlani, Lil Yachty, G-Eazy, Chance the Rapper, Miguel, MadeinTYO, Yuna, and Ty Dolla Sign, among others. Some of his songs in addition to "iSpy" include "Keep It Real", "Doubt It", "King Wavy" (featuring G-Eazy), and his 2018 hit single "Playinwitme" (featuring Kehlani). In 2015, Rolling Stone named him as "one of the ten artists you need to know".

His commercial mixtapes Beautiful Loser and Smyle were released in 2013 and 2015, respectively. Harvey's debut studio album Light of Mine was released in 2018 to positive reviews and reached within the top 30 of the Billboard 200.

Harvey made his acting debut in the 2018 Netflix original film The After Party. He also released a single from the film "Moment" (featuring Wiz Khalifa). His second album See You When I Am Famous was released on July 17, 2020.

== Early life ==
Harvey was born in the Reseda neighborhood of Los Angeles, California, to his parents who were married. During separation, he and his two siblings resided in a home of eight family members. He grew up one hour away in Ventura. He stated that he has a speech impediment and that during his youth he was bullied because of it. Harvey attended Ventura High School and regularly took part in drama classes which helped his confidence largely.

He started singing at the age of 6 and was writing and performing his own songs by elementary school. Harvey started rapping when he was about 13 years old and began recording music after hearing Kid Cudi's Man on the Moon: The End of Day. Harvey's first songs were recorded on PreSonus' Studio One recording software using his aunt's computer while in high school.

== Career ==
=== 2009–2012: Early mixtapes ===
Kyle started releasing mixtapes such as Senior Year, Second Semester, FxL, Super Duper, and K.i.D under the monikers KiddKash and K.i.D starting in 2009 to 2012.

=== 2013–2015: Beautiful Loser and Smyle ===
In 2013, he released his commercial debut mixtape Beautiful Loser. Although it did not chart on the Billboard 200, it peaked at number 40 on the R&B/Hip-Hop charts, and number 25 on the Rap charts. It was supported by the singles "Keep It Real", "Fruit Snacks", "Mr. Bang", and "Raining Love."

In May 2014, he was featured in G-Eazy's music video for "I Mean It" as a technical director on the fictional news set.

In October 2015, he released his follow up commercial mixtape Smyle. The album peaked on the Billboard 200 at number 76, and was supported by the single "Don't Wanna Fall in Love." The album featured a guest spot by Chance the Rapper on the track "Remember Me?" and has garnered over 2 million views on YouTube. Kyle's first music video to reach one million views was "Keep It Real", which was accomplished later that year.

=== 2016–present: Breakthrough and Light of Mine and See You When I Am Famous ===
In December 2016, Kyle released the single "iSpy", featuring Lil Yachty. The song gained widespread recognition for Kyle, and served as the lead single for his debut album Light of Mine. The song peaked at number 4 on the US Billboard Hot 100 and number 14 on the Canadian Hot 100. A remix featuring rapper Kodak Black was released on June 9, 2017. The song eventually reached Diamond certification status on April 16, 2026.

In February 2017, Kyle signed a deal with Atlantic Records. Four months later, Kyle was named as one of the ten 2017 XXL Freshmen along with A Boogie wit da Hoodie, PnB Rock, Playboi Carti, Ugly God, Aminé, MadeinTYO, Kamaiyah, Kap G, and XXXTentacion.

In March 2018, alongside the release of his single "Playinwitme" featuring Kehlani, Kyle announced that Khalid would be featured on a track titled "iMissMe". Although "Playinwitme" did not chart on the Billboard 200, it did chart at number 1 on Bubbling Under R&B/Hip-Hop Singles and achieved double Platinum status. Kyle's debut studio album Light of Mine was released on May 18, 2018. The album debuted at number 29 on the Billboard 200 and achieved Platinum status on February 18, 2021. The deluxe edition featured the song "Hey Julie!" featuring Lil Yachty, which went Platinum.

He appeared as the main character in the Netflix original film, The After Party, which debuted on August 24, 2018.

=== 2018–present: See You When I Am Famous, It's Not So Bad and Smyle Again ===
Kyle's second album See You When I Am Famous was released on July 17, 2020, and was supported by the singles "Yes!", "What It Is" and "Bouncin". The album peaked at number 124 on the Billboard 200 and failed to match the success of Light of Mine. One year after the release, Kyle parted ways with Atlantic Records.

On January 28, 2022, Kyle released the album It's Not So Bad as an NFT, his fifth project and first as a newly independent artist. It marks a creative departure from Kyle's pop rap roots, instead experimenting with R&B. It did not peak or appear on any charts.

On March 8, 2024, Kyle released the album Smyle Again, serving as a sequel to Smyle, through the labels Independently-Popular and APG.

== Discography ==
- Light of Mine (2018)
- See You When I Am Famous (2020)
- It's Not So Bad (2022)
- Smyle Again (2024)

== Filmography ==
=== Film ===
Year	Title	Role	Note
2018	The After Party	Owen Ellison	Lead role
2021	Cherry	Roy	

=== Television ===
Year	Title	Role	Note
2019–2020	Sugar and Toys	Himself	Main role
