= I Don't Have to Be Me ('til Monday) =

"I Don't Have To Be Me ('til Monday)"

Single by Steve Azar

from the album Waitin' on Joe
- B-side: "You Don't Know How It Feels"
- Released: October 1, 2001
- Genre: Country
- Length: 3:16
- Label: Mercury Nashville
- Songwriters: R.C. Bannon; Jason Young; Steve Azar
- Producer: Rafe Van Hoy

Steve Azar singles chronology
"Nights Like This" (1996)	"I Don't Have To Be Me ('til Monday)" (2001)	"Waitin' on Joe" (2002)

"I Don't Have To Be Me ('til Monday)" is a song by American country music artist Steve Azar. It was released in October 2001 as the lead-off single from his album Waitin' on Joe. The song peaked at number 2 on the US Billboard Hot Country Singles & Tracks chart, becoming Azar's highest-peaking single. Azar wrote this song with R.C. Bannon and Jason Young. It also peaked at number 35 on the Billboard Hot 100, making it his first and only Hot 100 entry, as well as his most successful single to date.

== Content ==
In the song, the male narrator decides to call in sick on Friday so that he can have a three-day weekend. The song is in a 4/4 time signature and moderate tempo in the key of A-flat major, following the chord progression A♭-E♭-Fm^{7}-D♭.

== Critical reception ==
Rick Cohoon of Allmusic gave the song a positive review, calling it "the lyrical embodiment of every working person’s fantasy" and "original, recognizable and conducive to toe tapping."

== Chart performance ==
"I Don't Have to Be Me ('til Monday)" debuted at number 57 on the US Billboard Hot Country Singles & Tracks for the chart week of October 6, 2001. "I Don't Have to Be Me" spent forty-four weeks on the Billboard Hot Country Singles & Tracks (now Hot Country Songs) charts, peaking at number 2 in mid-2002. It was his first charting single since "I Never Stopped Lovin' You" in 1996.

Chart (2001–2002)	Peak position
US Hot Country Songs (Billboard)	2
US Billboard Hot 100	35

=== Year-end charts ===
Chart (2002)	Position
US Country Songs (Billboard)	7
