= Sunshine School =

Sunshine School may refer to:

- Sunshine School (San Francisco, California), United States
- Sunshine School (Sunshine, Colorado), United States - see National Register of Historic Places listings in Boulder County, Colorado
- Sunshine School, a private school in Searcy, Arkansas, United States
- Sunshine Grammar School and College, Chittagong, Bangladesh

== See also ==
- Sunshine Beach State High School, Sunshine Beach, Queensland, Australia
