= Playinwitme =

Single by Kyle featuring Kehlani

from the album Light of Mine
- Released: March 15, 2018
- Length: 3:11
- Label: Indie-Pop; Atlantic
- Songwriters: Kyle Harvey; Kehlani Parrish; Justin Howze; Joshua Portillo; Jake Troth
- Producers: Superduperbrick; Naz; Jake Troth; M-Phazes

Kyle singles chronology
| "To the Moon" (2018) | "Playinwitme" (2018) | "Ikuyo" (2018) |

Kehlani singles chronology
| "Done for Me" (2018) | "Playinwitme" (2018) | "Nowhere Fast" (2018) |

Music video
- "Playinwitme" on YouTube

"Playinwitme" is a song by American rapper and singer Kyle featuring fellow American singer Kehlani. The two had previously collaborated on the former's 2015 single "Just a Picture". The song was released for digital download and streaming on March 15, 2018, and serves as the third single from his debut studio album Light of Mine (2018). It was produced by Superduperbrick, Naz, Jake Troth, and M-Phazes.

== Remixes ==
On August 20, 2018, a remix to the song was released with an additional feature from Logic. Later on November 29, 2018, another remix was released featuring Jay Park in place of Kehlani.

== Track listing ==
Digital download
| No. | Title | Length |
|---|---|---|
| 1. | "Playinwitme" (featuring Kehlani) | 3:11 |

Digital download — Remix
| No. | Title | Length |
|---|---|---|
| 1. | "Playinwitme" (Remix) (featuring Logic and Kehlani) | 3:37 |

Digital download — Remix
| No. | Title | Length |
|---|---|---|
| 1. | "Playinwitme" (Remix) (featuring Jay Park) | 3:13 |

== Credits and personnel ==
Credits adopted from Tidal

- Kyle – vocals, composition
- Kehlani – vocals, composition
- Jake Troth – composition, production
- Justin Howze – composition
- Joshua Portillo – composition
- Chris Gehringer – master engineering
- William Binderup – master engineering
- Martin Gray – master engineering
- Brian Cruz – master engineering
- Thomas Cullison – master engineering
- Matt Jacobson – master engineering
- Naz – production
- Kyle Harvey – executive production
- M-Phazes – production
- Erik Madrid – mixing

== Charts ==
=== Weekly charts ===
| Chart (2018) | Peak position |
|---|---|
| Australia (ARIA) | 38 |
| Belgium (Ultratip Bubbling Under Flanders) | 13 |
| Belgium (Ultratip Bubbling Under Wallonia) | 11 |
| Canada Hot 100 (Billboard) | 46 |
| Ireland (IRMA) | 47 |
| Netherlands (Single Top 100) | 44 |
| New Zealand (Recorded Music NZ) | 13 |
| UK Singles (OCC) | 61 |
| US Bubbling Under Hot 100 (Billboard) | 2 |
| US Bubbling Under R&B/Hip-Hop Singles (Billboard) | 1 |
| US Rhythmic Airplay (Billboard) | 11 |

=== Year-end charts ===
| Chart (2018) | Position |
|---|---|
| US Rhythmic (Billboard) | 50 |

== Certifications ==
| Region | Certification | Certified units/sales |
|---|---|---|
| Australia (ARIA) | Platinum | 70,000^{‡} |
| Canada (Music Canada) | Platinum | 80,000^{‡} |
| Denmark (IFPI Danmark) | Gold | 45,000^{‡} |
| New Zealand (RMNZ) | 2× Platinum | 60,000^{‡} |
| United Kingdom (BPI) | Silver | 200,000^{‡} |
| United States (RIAA) | 2× Platinum | 2,000,000^{‡} |
^{‡} Sales+streaming figures based on certification alone.

== Release history ==
| Region | Date | Format | Version | Label | Ref. |
|---|---|---|---|---|---|
| Worldwide | March 16, 2018 | Digital download | Original | Indie-Pop; Atlantic | |
| Italy | June 26, 2018 | Contemporary hit radio | Original | Warner | |
| Worldwide | August 20, 2018 | Digital download | Remix | Indie-Pop; Atlantic | |
| Worldwide | January 8, 2019 | Digital download | Remix | Indie-Pop; Atlantic | |
