= Sunshine, Harlan County, Kentucky =

Unincorporated community in Kentucky, United States

- Unincorporated community
- Location within Kentucky Location within the United States
- Coordinates: 36°50′14″N 83°19′43″W
- Country: United States
- State: Kentucky
- County: Harlan
- Elevation: 1,184 ft (361 m)
- Time zone: UTC-5 (Eastern (EST))
  - Summer (DST): UTC-4 (EDT)
- GNIS feature ID: 504809

Sunshine is an unincorporated community in Harlan County, Kentucky, United States. Its post office is closed.
