= Sunshine (Everybody Needs a Little) =

Single by Steve Azar

from the album Slide On Over Here
- Released: January 11, 2010
- Genre: Country
- Length: 4:45
- Label: Ride
- Songwriters: Steve Azar; Jason Young
- Producers: Steve Azar; Justin Niebank

Steve Azar singles chronology
"Moo La Moo" (2009)	"Sunshine (Everybody Needs a Little)" (2010)	"Hard Road" (2011)

"Sunshine (Everybody Needs a Little)" is a song by American country music artist Steve Azar. It was released in January 2010 as the second single from his album Slide On Over Here. Azar wrote the song with Jason Young and produced it with Justin Niebank.

== Critical reception ==
Bobby Peacock of Roughstock gave the song a favorable review, writing that "the lyrics are simple and effective, staying away from the possible clichés that they could easily have developed into." Peacock also praised the song's production and Azar's "slightly grained, laid-back delivery." Dan Milliken of Country Universe gave the song a C+ grade, calling it "about as exciting as a dreamless nap" and "a pleasant enough listen if you’re in the mood for it." In his review of the album, Matt Bjorke of Roughstock wrote that the song is "one of those no-doubter, romantic love songs that just feels like a hit."

== Music video ==
The music video was directed by Eric Welch and premiered in June 2010.

== Chart performance ==
"Sunshine (Everybody Needs a Little)" debuted at number 60 on the U.S. Billboard Hot Country Songs chart for the week of February 27, 2010.

Chart (2010)	Peak position
US Hot Country Songs (Billboard)	27
