= List of Sonshine Media Network International original programming =

This is a list of programs currently and originally aired on SMNI.

== Current programming ==
- A New Me: Story of Hope and Victory
- ACQ Classics (2013) - A Throwback Timeless messages of the Appointed Son.
- A Day in the Life of the Appointed Son - A 30-minute Activities of the Appointed Son of God.
- Caravan of Love (2017)
- Gikan sa Masa, para sa Masa (2023) - a public service and talk show hosted by former President Rodrigo Duterte.
- Give Us This Day (2003–hiatus) - a nightly show featuring fellowship with the Appointed Son of God, Pastor Apollo C. Quiboloy, singing and sharing of victory reports from viewers and Kingdom citizens around the world.
- Gospel of the Kingdom (2003) - a daily preaching program of Quiboloy featuring The King is Coming Tours from around the world (also aired on KCTV, KCNS, KVMD, KIKU-TV, WJYS, WSKY, Trinity Broadcasting Network, Joytv and IBC-13).
- Highest Praise (2003) – music videos featuring Kingdom Original Music by the Kingdom Musicians.
- Ito ang Buhay (This is Life) (2017) - a 1-hour program featuring Exclusive Interviews of Quiboloy.
- Kingdom Victories & Updates (formerly known as Kingdom Upclose) (2003) - recent church happenings, including the activities of Quiboloy.
- Newsline World (2006, 2011–present) (formerly Newsline) - SMNI's English late night newscast, aired live every 10pm.
- SMNI Newsblast (2016) - SMNI News Channel's primetime news program in Tagalog language.
- SMNI Newsbreak (2016) - SMNI News Channel's hourly news updates in Tagalog language.
- Powerline (2003–hiatus) - a one-and-a-half-hour Tagalog-language program of Quiboloy, where he discusses religious issues and answers queries.
- Quiet Moments (2003)– an hour of instrumental praise and worship combined with scenic views from the Garden of Eden Restored.
- Sounds of Worship (2003–2024) - this program airs the live Thanksgiving and worship presentation held in Davao City and different parts of the world.
- Spotlight (2017) - a program where Quiboloy and his companions discusses religious issues and answers queries.
- The Passion of the Christ (2011) - airs during Holy Week only (also aired on TV5 for the Tagalog dubbed and censored version).

=== Specials ===
- Christmas from the Heart (2003–hiatus) - a Christmas program produced for the benefit of the Children's Joy Foundation, whose goal is "To Feed, To Clothe, and To Send to School Millions of Children in the Philippines".
- Straight from the Heart (2004-hiatus)

== Former programming ==
- Batang Kaharian (lit. Kingdom Child) (2003–2022) – a 30-minute religious education program for children sponsored by the Children's Joy Foundation
- Daily Light – an hour of instrumental praise and worship combined with scenic views
- Eagle's Eye - a 1-hour of the Appointed Son of God featuring The Life Story of Miracles of the Father Almighty.
- Generation K (2003–2020) - a youth-oriented program produced in cooperation with the Keepers Club International
- I Am the Way – a 30-minute program of discussion of the Kingdom Doctrines based on the preaching of Quiboloy
- International Hour - a program that features bible studies and preachings in foreign languages, done by the Kingdom's world ambassadors
- Mindanao Karon (2005–2018) - a one-hour Saturday morning news and commentary program, hosted by Boy B'laan, aired in the Teleradyo format, simulcasting from DXRD 711 kHz Davao City.
- Tahanang Kaharian - a 1-hour home improvement and values program
- Walk with the Son – a 60-minute program that features testimonies, "victory reports" and life stories
- Way Ahead - a 30-minute program of Dedicated to the Elders of the Almighty Father
- Just the Hits - a 30-minute program featuring Kingdom Music Videos
