= Smyle =

Mixtape by Kyle
- Released: October 2, 2015
- Recorded: 2015
- Genre: Hip hop; pop rap
- Length: 46:53
- Label: Indie-Pop
- Producer: AxlFolie; Beni Haze; Carter Lang; Coucheron; Jordan Evans; M-Phazes; Matthew Burnett; Nottz; Oshi; Stefan Ponce; Sunny Norway

Kyle chronology
Beautiful Loser (2013)	Smyle (2015)	Light of Mine (2018)

Singles from Smyle
- 1. "Don't Wanna Fall in Love" Released: October 15, 2014; 2. "Really? Yeah!" Released: September 1, 2015; 3. "Endless Summer Symphony" Released: September 25, 2015

Professional ratings
Review scores
Source	Rating
AllMusic	3.5/5 stars

Smyle (pronounced "smile") is the second commercial mixtape by American hip hop recording artist Kyle. It features guest appearances from Chance the Rapper, Jesse Rutherford and Yuna. It was released through Indie-Pop (independently popular.) on October 2, 2015.

== Track listing ==
All tracks are written by Kyle.

No.	Title	Producer(s)	Length
1.	"The Force"	M-Phazes; Sunny Norway; Oshi	3:16
2.	"Feels Good"	Nottz; Beni Haze	3:37
3.	"SummertimeSoul"	M-Phazes; Sunny Norway	3:17
4.	"Don't Wanna Fall in Love"	M-Phazes	3:52
5.	"Endless Summer Symphony"	M-Phazes; Stefan Ponce	3:50
6.	"Really? Yeah!"	M-Phazes	3:54
7.	"Deepest Part of Me"	AxlFolie; Beni Haze; Sunny Norway	3:36
8.	"SuperDuperHero" (featuring SuperDuperBrick)	M-Phazes	4:19
9.	"All 4 You" (featuring Yuna)	Carter Lang; Sunny Norway	4:35
10.	"Remember Me?" (featuring Chance the Rapper)	Matthew Burnett; Jordan Evans	3:43
11.	"All Right"	M-Phazes; Sunny Norway	4:31
12.	"Dewwutitdoez"	Coucheron; M-Phazes	3:59
13.	"@Foundbae" (featuring Jesse Rutherford)	AxlFolie	4:04
Total length:			46:53

== Charts ==
Chart (2015)	Peak position
US Billboard 200	76
US Top R&B/Hip-Hop Albums (Billboard)	10
US Top Rap Albums (Billboard)	7
