= ISpy (Kyle song) =

2016 single by Kyle featuring Lil Yachty

"iSpy"

Single by Kyle featuring Lil Yachty

from the album Light of Mine
- Released: December 2, 2016
- Recorded: 2016
- Genre: Hip-hop
- Length: 4:14; 3:44 (radio edit)
- Label: Indie-Pop; Atlantic
- Songwriters: Kyle Harvey; Miles McCollum; Joshua Portillo; Justin Howze; Malik Keith
- Producers: Naz; Chico Jay; SuperDuperBrick; Lege Kale

Kyle singles chronology
"Blame" (2016)	"iSpy" (2016)	"Want Me Bad" (2017)

Lil Yachty singles chronology
"After the Afterparty" (2016)	"iSpy" (2016)	"From the D to the A" (2017)

Music video
- "iSpy feat. Lil Yachty" on YouTube

"iSpy" is a song by the American rapper Kyle featuring fellow American rapper Lil Yachty. It was released on December 2, 2016, by Indie-Pop (independently popular) and Atlantic Records. It is the lead single from Kyle's debut studio album Light of Mine (2018). The song was produced by Naz, Chico Jay, SuperDuperBrick, and Lege Kale.

== Background ==
In an interview for website Genius, Kyle talked about the creation process behind the song:

The making of "iSpy" it was super casual. It was me and Ayo [now known as Naz] in the studio. We just wanted to make some feel-good shit. I just had this little piano and started playing bomp bomp bomp—very badly, though, 'cause I’m not that raw. And then Ayo replayed it and made it saucy.

The official remix, which features American rapper Kodak Black, was released on June 9, 2017, with some slightly altered lyrics "to shout out Kodak and [to] talk about the original single".

== Music video ==
The music video was released on April 7, 2017, on Kyle's YouTube account. It was directed by Colin Tilley. The official video features the heads of Kyle and Lil Yachty animated onto children's bodies for the duration of the video, with one critic noting that, "their childish sense of humour beams out of every scene." Discussing the idea for the video, Kyle said, "It was [Tilley's] concept. I just agreed on it. I told him, 'This song is fun. The video needs to be twice as fun...' It doesn't get more feel good than being a baby surrounded by incredible looking women at the beach with no cares in the world."

Prior to the release of the official video, an animated lyric video was released on Kyle's YouTube channel and amassed 19 million in its first month, causing the song to receive an uptick in recognition.

The lyric video was well received, with one critic saying, "The track itself came out [in 2016], but the video...makes the song sound even better." The lyric video was produced by Carpool Films, directed by Jayme Lamperle, and animated by Lamperle, Courtney Garvin, Frank Gidlewski, Evan Red Borja and Jake Reed.

== Critical reception ==
David Drake of Complex wrote that the song is "reminiscent of 'Broccoli', between the stop-start kick drums, its sweet charming tone, and the evident fun of its screwball lyrics".

== Chart performance ==
"iSpy" debuted at number 80 on the Billboard Hot 100 for the chart dated January 14, 2017. It peaked at number four on the chart dated April 22, 2017, becoming Kyle's first and Lil Yachty's second top five single.

== Charts ==
=== Weekly charts ===
Chart (2017)	Peak position
Australia (ARIA)	33
Australia Urban (ARIA)	6
Belgium (Ultratip Bubbling Under Flanders)	14
Belgium (Ultratip Bubbling Under Wallonia)	25
Canada Hot 100 (Billboard)	14
Czech Republic Singles Digital (ČNS IFPI)	47
Ireland (IRMA)	57
Netherlands (Single Top 100)	86
New Zealand (Recorded Music NZ)	22
Philippines (Philippine Hot 100)	13
Portugal (AFP)	56
Scotland Singles (OCC)	30
Slovakia Singles Digital (ČNS IFPI)	46
Sweden (Sverigetopplistan)	79
Switzerland (Schweizer Hitparade)	61
UK Singles (OCC)	33
US Billboard Hot 100	4
US Hot R&B/Hip-Hop Songs (Billboard)	3
US Pop Airplay (Billboard)	19
US Rhythmic Airplay (Billboard)	1

=== Year-end charts ===
Chart (2017)	Position
Canada (Canadian Hot 100)	40
US Billboard Hot 100	28
US Hot R&B/Hip-Hop Songs (Billboard)	14
US Rhythmic (Billboard)	11

== Certifications ==
Region	Certification	Certified units/sales
Australia (ARIA)	3× Platinum	210,000^{‡}
Canada (Music Canada)	5× Platinum	400,000^{‡}
Denmark (IFPI Danmark)	Gold	45,000^{‡}
France (SNEP)	Gold	100,000^{‡}
Germany (BVMI)	Gold	200,000^{‡}
Italy (FIMI)	Gold	25,000^{‡}
New Zealand (RMNZ)	3× Platinum	90,000^{‡}
Poland (ZPAV)	Gold	25,000^{‡}
Portugal (AFP)	Gold	5,000^{‡}
Switzerland (IFPI Switzerland)	Gold	15,000^{‡}
United Kingdom (BPI)	Platinum	600,000^{‡}
United States (RIAA)	Diamond	10,000,000^{‡}
^{‡} Sales+streaming figures based on certification alone.
