= A. J. Masters =

American country music singer-songwriter (1950–2015)

- Birth name: Arthur John Masaracchia
- Born: December 20, 1950; Walden, New York, U.S.
- Died: January 12, 2015 (aged 64) near Nashville, Tennessee, U.S.
- Genres: Country
- Occupation: Singer-songwriter
- Instrument(s): Vocals, guitar
- Years active: 1970s–2015
- Labels: Bermuda Dunes Records

Arthur John Masaracchia (December 20, 1950 – January 12, 2015), better known as A. J. Masters, was an American country music singer. He charted eight singles on the Hot Country Songs chart, between 1985 and 1987. He also wrote songs for John Berry, Faith Hill, and Jennifer Hanson.

== Biography ==
Masters was born in Walden, New York but raised in Compton, California. He played bass guitar in his brother's band, and had his first cut in 1978 when Mickey Jones recorded "I'm No Cowboy".

Masters signed with Bermuda Dunes records in the 1980s, charting with eight of his releases for the label. The highest peak was number 48 with "Back Home", his second release, in early 1986. He also released an album of the same name in 1986. An uncredited review in Billboard gave Back Home a positive review, saying that Masters had "a light, intense, and flexible quality". A review of "I Don't Mean Maybe", his fourth single, praised his "full and assertive voice."

Masters received an Academy of Country Music shortlist nomination for New Male Vocalist of the Year. In the 1990s, Masters played guitar for Charlie Rich and wrote the songs "Change My Mind", which was recorded by both The Oak Ridge Boys and John Berry, "Someday" and "Moo La Moo" by Steve Azar, "Last Request" by Frazier River, "Love Ain't Like That" by Faith Hill, and "Half a Heart Tattoo" by Jennifer Hanson. He died on January 12, 2015, of prostate cancer.

== Discography ==
Year	Single	Peak chart positions
Year	Single	US Country
1985	"Lonely Together"	86
1986	"Back Home"	48
1986	"Love Keep Your Distance"	54
1986	"I Don't Mean Maybe"	65
1987	"Take a Little Bit of It Home"	58
1987	"In It Again"	70
1987	"255 Harbor Drive"	67
1987	"Our Love Is Like the South"^{A}	77

- ^{A}B-side to "255 Harbor Drive".
