= Faith Hill discography =

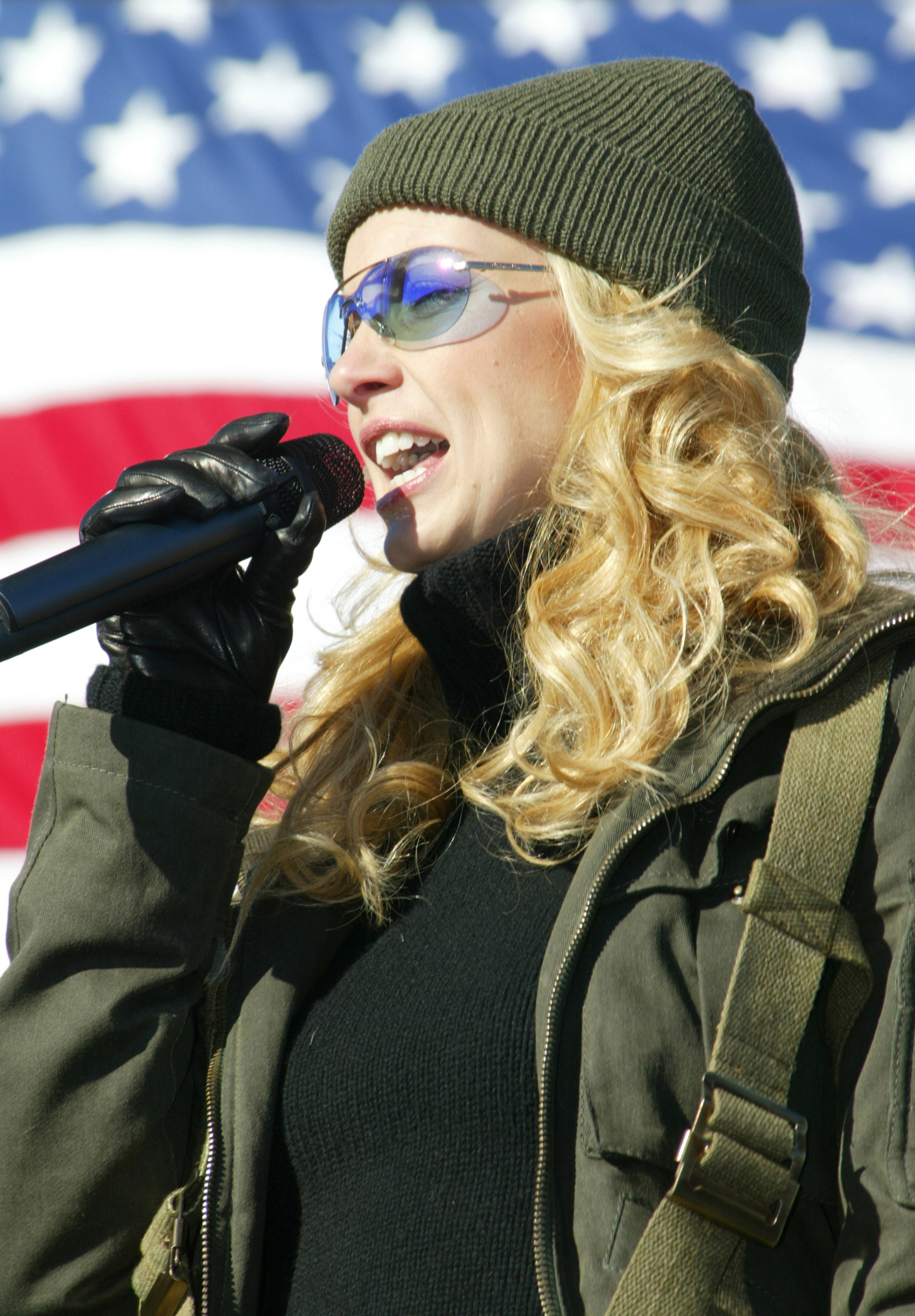
- Hill performing a special tribute for the Armed Forces on Good Morning America (2009)
- Studio albums: 8
- Compilation albums: 4
- Singles: 43
- Video albums: 1
- Music videos: 38
- Other charted songs: 12

The discography of American singer, Faith Hill, contains eight studio albums, four compilation albums, one video album, 43 singles (including seven as a featured artist), 12 other charted songs and 38 music videos. Hill made her debut in October 1993 with Take Me as I Am, which made the top-10 on both the US and Canadian country albums charts, while also certifying triple platinum in both countries. Its first two singles, "Wild One" and "Piece of My Heart", reached number one on both the US and Canadian country song charts. The title track made the top-10 on the US Hot Country Songs chart in 1994. Her second studio album was released in August 1995 called It Matters to Me and certified quadruple platinum. Its title track topped the US country chart and reached number two on the Canadian country chart. The album spawned four more US-Canadian top-10 singles: "Let's Go to Vegas", "Someone Else's Dream", "You Can't Lose Me" and "I Can't Do That Anymore".

Hill collaborated with Tim McGraw on number one 1997 country song, "It's Your Love". Then, her third studio offering, Faith, was released in April 1998 and sold a total of 10-million copies internationally. Faith reached the top-10 on both the US Billboard 200 and Top Country Albums charts, while also topping the Canadian country albums chart. Its lead single, "This Kiss", topped the US and Canadian country surveys, while also reaching the top-10 on the US Hot 100 and its Adult Contemporary chart. Faith also spawned the number-one country song, "Let Me Let Go", and the top-10 country singles "Just to Hear You Say That You Love Me" (with Tim McGraw) and "The Secret of Life". Hill's fourth studio album, Breathe, was issued in November 1999 and sold 15 million copies internationally. It also topped multiple charts across the US and Canada, while also making the top-10 in Australia and New Zealand. Its title track reached was a US-Canadian country and adult contemporary chart topper. Its follow-up, "The Way You Love Me", made similar chart positions, along with becoming her second top-20 song in the UK.

The 2001 single, "There You'll Be", topped the US adult contemporary and Canadian singles charts, along with making the top-10 in Germany, The Netherlands and the UK. In October 2002, Cry became Hill's fifth studio album released and sold three million copies worldwide. Cry topped the US country and all-genre charts, while also making the top-10 in Australia and Canada. Its title track was her third US adult contemporary chart-topper and also reached number three in Canada. Hill's sixth album was released in August 2005 titled Fireflies. It sold three million copies across North America and topped the US all-genre list, the US country albums survey and the Canada all-genre chart. Its lead single, "Mississippi Girl", was a number one US and Canadian country songs recording. Its was followed by three more US-Canadian top-10 country songs: "Like We Never Loved at All" (with Tim McGraw), "The Lucky One" and "Sunshine and Summertime".

In October 2007, Hill's third compilation titled The Hits featured two new singles that made the US country top 40: "Lost" and "Red Umbrella". Her duet with McGraw the same year, "I Need You", was a top-10 Canadian and US country single. Her seventh studio album, Joy to the World, was released in September 2008 and certified gold in the US. Its single, "A Baby Changes Everything", topped the US adult contemporary chart. Her unreleased studio album, Illusion, produced two top 40 US-Canadian country singles: "Come Home" (2011) and "American Heart" (2012). Her 2014 duet with McGraw, "Meanwhile Back at Mama's", reached the top-10 on the US country chart and went to number one on the Canadian country chart. Her eighth studio album was a collaborative disc with McGraw titled The Rest of Our Life, which was released in November 2017. The album reached the top-10 in the US, Australia and Canada. Its lead single, "Speak to a Girl", made the Hot Country Songs top-10.

== Albums ==
=== Studio albums ===
List of albums, with selected chart positions and certifications, showing other relevant details
Title	Album details	Peak chart positions										Certifications (sales threshold)
Title	Album details	US	US Cou.	AUS	CAN	CAN Cou.	GER	NZ	SWE	SWI	UK	Certifications (sales threshold)
Take Me as I Am	Release date: October 12, 1993; Label: Warner Bros. Nashville; Formats: CD, cassette	59	7	—	51	2	—	—	—	—	—	MC: 3× Platinum; RIAA: 3× Platinum
It Matters to Me	Release date: August 29, 1995; Label: Warner Bros. Nashville; Formats: CD, cassette	29	4	—	40	2	—	—	—	—	—	MC: 4× Platinum; RIAA: 4× Platinum
Faith	Release date: April 21, 1998; Label: Warner Bros. Nashville; Formats: CD, cassette	7	2	20	11	1	66	—	—	—	177	ARIA: Gold; MC: 4× Platinum; RIAA: 6× Platinum
Breathe	Release date: November 9, 1999; Label: Warner Bros. Nashville; Formats: CD, cassette	1	1	7	13	1	76	3	12	38	19	ARIA: 2× Platinum; BPI: Gold; MC: 5× Platinum; RIAA: 8× Platinum
Cry	Release date: October 15, 2002; Label: Warner Bros. Nashville; Formats: CD, cassette	1	1	10	3	—	12	16	22	20	29	ARIA: Gold; MC: Platinum; RIAA: 2× Platinum
Fireflies	Release date: August 2, 2005; Label: Warner Bros. Nashville; Formats: CD, music download	1	1	51	2	—	—	—	45	37	—	MC: Platinum; RIAA: 2× Platinum
Joy to the World	Release date: September 30, 2008; Label: Warner Bros. Nashville; Formats: CD, digital download	13	2	—	—	—	—	—	—	—	—	RIAA: Gold
The Rest of Our Life (with Tim McGraw)	Release date: November 17, 2017; Label: Arista Nashville; Formats: CD, digital download	2	1	9	2	—	—	—	—	64	80	
"—" denotes a recording that did not chart or was not released in that territory.

=== Compilation albums ===
List of albums, with selected chart positions and certifications, showing other relevant details
Title	Album details	Peak chart positions								Certifications (sales threshold)
Title	Album details	US	US Cou.	AUS	GER	NZ	SWE	SWI	UK	Certifications (sales threshold)
Piece of My Heart (Note: Piece of My Heart and There You'll Be were only released outside of North America.)	Release date: November 1, 1996; Label: WEA International/Warner Bros.; Formats: CD	—	—	—	—	—	—	—	—	
There You'll Be	Release date: October 8, 2001; Label: WEA International; Formats: CD	—	—	5	14	16	10	13	6	ARIA: 5× Platinum; BPI: Platinum
The Hits	Release date: October 2, 2007; Label: Warner Bros. Nashville; Formats: CD, digital download	12	3	35	—	—	—	—	—	
Deep Tracks	Release date: November 18, 2016; Label: Warner Bros. Nashville; Formats: CD, digital download	—	22	—	—	—	—	—	—	
"—" denotes a recording that did not chart or was not released in that territory.

== Singles ==
=== As lead artist ===
List of singles as lead artist, with selected chart positions and certifications, showing year released and album name
Title	Year	Peak chart positions										Certifications	Album
Title	Year	US	US AC	US Cou.	AUS	CAN (Note: Chart positions for Canadian charts come from RPM (1993–2000), Canadian Singles Chart (2000–2007) and Canadian Hot 100 (2007–present).)	CAN AC (Note: Chart positions for Canadian charts come from RPM (1993–2000) and Canada AC (2006–present).)	CAN Cou. (Note: Chart positions for Canadian charts come from RPM (1993–2000), Radio & Records (2004–2006) and Canada Country (2006–present).)	GER	ND	UK	Certifications	Album
"Wild One"	1993	—	—	1	—	—	—	1	—	—	92		Take Me as I Am
"Piece of My Heart"	1994	— (Note: "Piece of My Heart" did not enter the Billboard Hot 100, but reached number 15 on the Bubbling Under Hot 100 Singles extension chart.)	—	1	—	—	—	1	—	—	—		Take Me as I Am
"But I Will"	1994	—	—	35	—	—	—	28	—	—	—		Take Me as I Am
"Take Me as I Am"	1994	—	—	2	—	—	—	12	—	—	—		Take Me as I Am
"Let's Go to Vegas"	1995	— (Note: "Let's Go to Vegas" did not enter the Billboard Hot 100, but reached number 22 on the Bubbling Under Hot 100 Singles extension chart.)	—	5	—	—	—	9	—	—	—		It Matters to Me
"It Matters to Me"	1995	74	—	1	—	—	—	2	—	—	—		It Matters to Me
"Someone Else's Dream"	1996	—	—	3	—	—	—	8	—	—	—		It Matters to Me
"You Can't Lose Me"	1996	—	—	6	—	—	—	1	—	—	—		It Matters to Me
"I Can't Do That Anymore"	1996	—	—	8	—	—	—	11	—	—	—		It Matters to Me
"This Kiss"	1998	7	3	1	4	24	2	1	52	77	13	RIAA: Platinum; ARIA: Platinum; BPI: Silver; RMNZ: Platinum	Faith
"Just to Hear You Say That You Love Me" (with Tim McGraw)	1998	—	—	3	—	—	—	4	—	—	—		Faith
"Let Me Let Go"	1998	33	10	1	—	—	17	1	—	—	72		Faith
"Love Ain't Like That"	1999	68	—	12	—	—	—	15	—	—	—		Faith
"The Secret of Life"	1999	46	—	4	—	—	—	2	—	—	—		Faith
"Breathe"	1999	2	1	1	23	—	1	1	—	95	33	RIAA: Gold; RMNZ: Gold	Breathe
"The Way You Love Me"	2000	6	3	1	31	—	9	1	—	89	15		Breathe
"Let's Make Love" (with Tim McGraw)	2000	54	—	5	—	—	—	6	—	—	—		Breathe
"Where Are You Christmas?"	2000	65	10	26	—	—	—	—	—	35	—		How the Grinch Stole Christmas
"If My Heart Had Wings"	2001	39	—	3	—	—	—	—	—	—	—		Breathe
"There You'll Be"	2001	11	1	10	24	1	—	—	8	4	3	BPI: Platinum; RMNZ: Gold	Pearl Harbor
"Cry"	2002	33	1	12	35	3	—	—	93	83	25	MC: Gold	Cry
"When the Lights Go Down"	2002	— (Note: "When the Lights Go Down" did not enter the Billboard Hot 100, but reached number 19 on the Bubbling Under Hot 100 Singles extension chart.)	—	26	—	—	—	—	64	—	—		Cry
"One"	2003	— (Note: "One" did not enter the Billboard Hot 100, but reached number 24 on the Bubbling Under Hot 100 Singles extension chart.)	7	—	—	—	—	—	—	—	—		Cry
"You're Still Here"	2003	—	—	28	—	—	—	—	—	—	—		Cry
"Mississippi Girl"	2005	29	—	1	—	—	—	1	—	—	—		Fireflies
"Like We Never Loved at All" (with Tim McGraw)	2005	45	9	5	—	—	26	10	—	—	—		Fireflies
"The Lucky One"	2006	69	—	5	—	—	—	1	—	—	—		Fireflies
"Sunshine and Summertime"	2006	70	—	7	—	—	—	1	—	—	—		Fireflies
"Stealing Kisses"	2006	—	—	36	—	—	—	44	—	—	—		Fireflies
"Lost"	2007	61	11	32	—	40	—	43	—	—	—		The Hits
"Red Umbrella"	2007	— (Note: "Red Umbrella" did not enter the Billboard Hot 100, but reached number 21 on the Bubbling Under Hot 100 Singles extension chart.)	—	28	—	—	—	34	—	—	—		The Hits
"A Baby Changes Everything"	2008	— (Note: "A Baby Changes Everything" did not enter the Billboard Hot 100, but reached number 5 on the Bubbling Under Hot 100 Singles extension chart.)	1	36	—	—	—	—	—	—	—		Joy to the World
"Come Home" (Note: "Come Home" and "American Heart" were intended to be included on Hill's album Illusion, which was ultimately not released.)	2011	82	—	26	—	—	—	40	—	—	—		Non-album singles
"American Heart"	2012	—	—	35	—	—	—	—	—	—	—		Non-album singles
"Speak to a Girl" (with Tim McGraw)	2017	61	—	6	—	—	—	27	—	—	—		The Rest of Our Life
"The Rest of Our Life" (with Tim McGraw)	2017	98	—	18	—	—	—	48	—	—	—		The Rest of Our Life
"—" denotes a recording that did not chart in that territory.

=== As a featured artist ===
List of singles as a featured artist, with selected chart positions and certifications, showing year released and album name
Title	Year	Peak chart positions								Certifications	Album
Title	Year	US	US AC	US Cou.	US Cou. Air.	AUS	CAN	CAN AC	CAN Cou.	Certifications	Album
"Hope" (featured with various artists) (Note: All-star collaboration featuring John Berry, Terri Clark, Vince Gill, Faith Hill, Tracy Lawrence, Little Texas, Neal McCoy, Tim McGraw, Lorrie Morgan, Marty Stuart, Travis Tritt, and Trisha Yearwood.)	1996	—	—	57		—	—	—	—		—N/a
"It's Your Love" (Tim McGraw with Faith Hill)	1997	7	—	1		—	—	—	1	RIAA: 5× Platinum	Everywhere
"One Heart at a Time" (featured with various artists) (Note: All-star collaboration featuring Garth Brooks, Billy Dean, Faith Hill, Neal McCoy, Michael McDonald, Olivia Newton-John, Victoria Shaw, and Bryan White.)	1998	56	—	69		—	—	—	—		—N/a
"I Need You" (Tim McGraw with Faith Hill)	2007	50	—	8		—	75	—	4	RIAA: Platinum	Let It Go
"The First Noël" (Josh Groban featuring Faith Hill)	2007	— (Note: "The First Noël" did not enter the Billboard Hot 100, but reached number 23 on the Bubbling Under Hot 100 Singles extension chart.)	20	—		—	—	21	—		Noël
"Meanwhile Back at Mama's" (Tim McGraw with Faith Hill)	2014	41	—	7	2	—	47	—	1	RIAA: Platinum	Sundown Heaven Town
"Forever Country" (as Artists of Then, Now & Forever)	2016	21	—	1	33	26	34	—	25	RIAA: Gold	—N/a
"—" denotes a recording that did not chart in that territory.

== Other charted songs ==
List of songs, with selected chart positions, showing year released and album name
Title	Year	Peak chart positions			Album
Title	Year	US Bub.	US Cou.	CAN AC	Album
"I Got My Baby"	1999	—	63	—	Breathe
"It Will Be Me"	1999	—	68	—	Breathe
"If I'm Not in Love"	1999	—	74	—	Breathe
"The Star-Spangled Banner" (Live recording from Super Bowl XXXIV)	2001	18	35	—	—N/a
"There Will Come a Day"	2001	—	36	—	Breathe
"Joy to the World"	2008	—	44	—	Joy to the World
"Santa Claus Is Coming to Town"	2008	—	53	—	Joy to the World
"Little Drummer Boy"	2008	—	58	—	Joy to the World
"O Come All Ye Faithful"	2009	—	60	—	Joy to the World
"Holly Jolly Christmas"	2009	—	—	44	Joy to the World
"Give In to Me"	2011	—	56	—	Country Strong
"Keep Your Eyes on Me" (with Tim McGraw)	2017	—	44	—	The Shack
"—" denotes a recording that did not chart in that territory.

== Videography ==
=== Video albums ===
Title	Album details
When the Lights Go Down	Release date: July 7, 2003; Label: Warner Music Vision; Formats: DVD

=== Music videos ===
Year	Title	Director
1993	"Wild One"	Neil Burger
1994	"Piece of My Heart"	Deaton Flanigen
1994	"But I Will"	Leta Warner
1994	"Take Me as I Am"	Deaton Flanigen
1995	"Let's Go to Vegas"	Adam Bernstein
1995	"It Matters to Me"	Randee St. Nicholas
1996	"You Can't Lose Me"	Steven Goldmann
1996	"I Can't Do That Anymore"	Jon Small
1997	"It's Your Love" (with Tim McGraw)	Sherman Halsey
1998	"This Kiss"	Steven Goldmann
1998	"Just to Hear You Say That You Love Me" (with Tim McGraw)	Jim Shea
1998	"Let Me Let Go"	Peter Nydrle
1999	"The Secret of Life"	Steven Goldmann
1999	"Breathe"	Lili Fini Zanuck
2000	"The Way You Love Me"	Joseph Kahn
2000	"Let's Make Love" (with Tim McGraw)	Lili Fini Zanuck
2000	"Where Are You Christmas?"	Paul Hunter
2001	"If My Heart Had Wings"	Mike Simon
2001	"There You'll Be"	Michael Bay
2002	"Cry"	Mike Lipscombe
2003	"When the Lights Go Down"	Gary Halvorson
2003	"You're Still Here"	Matthew Rolston
2005	"Mississippi Girl"	Wayne Isham
2005	"Like We Never Loved at All" (with Tim McGraw)	Sophie Muller
2006	"The Lucky One"	Chris Hicky
2006	"Stealing Kisses"	Sophie Muller
2007	"I Need You" (with Tim McGraw)	Sherman Halsey
2007	"Peace in the Valley"	Scott Lochmus
2007	"Red Umbrella"	Ivan Dudynsky
2008	"A Baby Changes Everything"	Chris Hicky
2011	"The Way You Look Tonight" (with Tony Bennett)	Unjoo Moon
2012	"American Heart"	Trey Fanjoy
2014	"Meanwhile Back at Mama's" (with Tim McGraw)	Shane Drake
2017	"Speak to a Girl" (with Tim McGraw)	Sophie Muller
2017	"The Rest of Our Life" (with Tim McGraw)	Grant Singer

==== Guest appearances ====
Year	Title	Director
1994	"Amazing Grace" (with Maverick Choir).	Richard Donner
1998	"Back in the Saddle" (with Patty Loveless, Trisha Yearwood, Suzy Bogguss, Martina McBride and Matraca Berg).	Steven Goldmann
1998	"One Heart at a Time" (with Billy Dean, Michael McDonald, Bryan White, Neal McCoy, Olivia Newton-John, Victoria Shaw and Garth Brooks).	Ritch Sublett
2016	"Forever Country" (with Artists of Then, Now & Forever).	Joseph Kahn
