= Breaking All the Rules =

Breaking All the Rules may refer to:

== Film and TV ==
- Breaking All the Rules (film), a 1985 film directed by James Orr
- Breakin' All the Rules, a 2004 film
- Breaking all the Rules: The Creation of Trivial Pursuit, a 1988 film about the creation of the game Trivial Pursuit

== Music ==
- Breaking All the Rules (Peter Frampton album), 1981, or the title song
- Breaking All the Rules (She Moves album)
  - "Breaking All the Rules" (She Moves song), 1997
- "Breaking All the Rules," a song from the Ozzy Osbourne album No Rest for the Wicked
- Breaking All the Rules (3 of Hearts album), 2005
