= Soul2Soul Tour =

2000 concert tour by Tim McGraw and Faith Hill

Soul2Soul 2000
- Tour by Tim McGraw and Faith Hill
- Start date: July 12, 2000
- End date: December 12, 2000
- Legs: 2
- No. of shows: 65 in North America

Tim McGraw and Faith Hill concert chronology
- Soul2Soul Tour (2000); Soul2Soul II Tour 2006 (2006)

The Soul2Soul 2000 Tour was the first joint concert tour by American country singers, and husband and wife, Tim McGraw and Faith Hill. The concert tour began in Atlanta in July 2000, and ended later that year in December in Orlando. The tour's shows featured an opening set by Hill, then a set by McGraw, followed by some songs performed jointly. The tour reflected both the successful marriage of the two artists as well as their very different styles and the dual directions country music was going in at the time.

The tour grossed nearly $50 million and was witnessed by close to 950,000 people. 60 of the 65 reported shows were sold-out. It was fifth highest grossing of any genre in North America, and the leading country music tour, during 2000. An estimated 1 million people attended the shows. The pairing of the musically divergent couple led to Pollstar giving the tour its second-most important Concert Industry Award, that of Most Creative Tour Package for 2000.

== History ==
This was not the first time the two had toured together: Hill was McGraw's opening act on his 1996 Spontaneous Combustion Tour, which is where they first met. The Soul2Soul Tour was in support of their most recent albums at the time, McGraw's A Place In The Sun and Hill's mega-success Breathe. The tour was originally set to run July through October, however, following unexpected success (the opening leg grossed $18 million), the tour was extended into the end of the year.

The opening night at the Philips Arena in Atlanta was sold out, but so many fans showed up looking to get in that the local promoter opened up a section behind the stage and let the fans in.

At the Madison Square Garden show in New York City – where a local radio host proclaimed the show the biggest country concert ever to hit the city – McGraw's father Tug McGraw was in attendance, as was New York Yankee pitcher Roger Clemens, who appeared onstage to bring Tim McGraw a Bud Lite.

After the tour concluded, McGraw toured on a solo basis, but Hill did not, until the couple staged their next joint production, the more elaborate and even more commercially successful Soul2Soul II Tour 2006.

== The stage and the show ==
The show featured a unique 360 degree endstage that allowed for full arena capacity, with a catwalk and raised podiums on either side of the stage and a riser from below for performer entrances. It took almost 100 roadies to move the production from city to city.

The show was presented as two self-contained sets. Hill would perform first, followed by a short intermission and then McGraw would take the stage. In a sense Hill was still an opening act for McGraw, as the applause generally indicated that the majority of the audience was clearly there to see McGraw. The couple's music was very different at this stage of their careers, as Hill was exploring pop, techno and programmed drums, and 1960s retro sounds, while McGraw stuck to his more mainstream country approach.

After McGraw's set, a video montage was presented of the couple's family, then the two returned to close the show with five duets; the show closer was a rendition of Fleetwood Mac's "Go Your Own Way".

== Critical reception ==
CMT News wrote that "Go Your Own Way" represented "a clear-cut declaration of where country music finds itself today, aimed at Gen-Xers and baby boomers and drifting more into the pop realm than ever before." Rolling Stone said that in the show, "McGraw and Hill provided an interesting contrast in the differences between country and not country, pop country and pop pop." The San Francisco Chronicle found the "Go Your Own Way" ending, with the couple singing from opposite ends of the stage, "a little unclear on the concept: Country music's most happily marrieds were singing a bitter breakup song from rock's most famous divorce album to end their show."

Some critics reacted unfavorably to Hill's performance, criticizing her as a "vacuous and wooden entertainer", "lack[ing] identity [and singing] cotton candy", with a "voice [that] comes across as thin ... exposing...absolutely nothing in resembling personality." Her rendition of Janis Joplin's "Piece of My Heart" came in particular for poor notices. One newspaper mentioned "her face full of Revlon", and indeed it was later reported that her makeup kit for the tour was a 300-pound case on seven wheels, designed specifically for her at $4,000 cost. Other writers praised Hill, saying she "belted it out with the best of them", and praising her performance of her "There Will Come a Day".

== Set list ==
Hill

1. "What's In It For Me?"
2. "The Way You Love Me"
3. "If My Heart Had Wings"
4. "Wild One"
5. "I've Got My Baby"
6. "The Secret of Life"
7. "That's How Love Moves" ^{1}
8. "Let Me Let Go"
9. "Breathe"
10. "It Matters To Me"
11. "Love Child" ^{1}
12. "Piece of My Heart"
13. "Let's Go to Vegas"
14. "Where Are You, Christmas?" ^{1}
15. "There Will Come A Day"
16. "This Kiss"

McGraw

17. "Indian Outlaw" (Instrumental introduction)
18. "Heartbroken Again" ^{1}
19. "Where the Green Grass Grows"
20. "Something Like That"
21. "Refried Dreams"
22. "Everywhere"
23. "Don't Take the Girl"
24. "Just to See You Smile"
25. "For a Little While"
26. "Down On the Farm"
27. "The Joker"
28. "Seventeen" (contains elements of "It Was a Very Good Year")
29. "Some Things Never Change"
30. "All I Want"
31. "I Like It, I Love It"

Hill/McGraw

1. "It's Your Love"
2. "Let Me Love You"
3. "Angry All the Time"
4. "Let's Make Love"
5. "Go Your Own Way"

^{1} Performed at select shows

== Opening acts ==
Keith Urban served as an unannounced opening act at some shows. The Warren Brothers also opened some shows.

== Tour dates ==
Date	City	Country	Venue
July 12, 2000	Atlanta	United States	Philips Arena
July 13, 2000	Birmingham	United States	BJCC Arena
July 15, 2000	Raleigh	United States	Raleigh Entertainment & Sports Arena
July 16, 2000	Greenville	United States	Bi-Lo Center
July 18, 2000	Sunrise	United States	National Car Rental Center
July 19, 2000	Tampa	United States	Ice Palace
July 21, 2000	New Orleans	United States	New Orleans Arena
July 22, 2000	Memphis	United States	Pyramid Arena
July 23, 2000	Lafayette	United States	Cajundome
July 26, 2000	Denver	United States	Pepsi Center
July 28, 2000	Salt Lake City	United States	Delta Center
July 29, 2000	Las Vegas	United States	Mandalay Bay Events Center
July 31, 2000	San Jose	United States	San Jose Arena
August 4, 2000	Anaheim	United States	Arrowhead Pond of Anaheim
August 5, 2000	San Diego	United States	Cox Arena
August 6, 2000	Phoenix	United States	America West Arena
August 8, 2000	Sacramento	United States	ARCO Arena
August 9, 2000	Oakland	United States	The Arena in Oakland
August 11, 2000	Portland	United States	Rose Garden Arena
August 12, 2000	Tacoma	United States	Tacoma Dome
August 13, 2000	Spokane	United States	Spokane Veterans Memorial Arena
August 15, 2000	Boise	United States	BSC Pavilion
August 18, 2000	Fargo	United States	Fargodome
August 19, 2000	Minneapolis	United States	Target Center
August 20, 2000	Chicago	United States	United Center
September 1, 2000	Cleveland	United States	Gund Arena
September 2, 2000	Pittsburgh	United States	Mellon Arena
September 3, 2000	Grand Rapids	United States	Van Andel Arena
September 6, 2000	Knoxville	United States	Thompson–Boling Arena
September 8, 2000	University Park	United States	Bryce Jordan Center
September 9, 2000	Columbus	United States	Nationwide Arena
September 10, 2000	Columbus	United States	Nationwide Arena
September 12, 2000	Albany	United States	Pepsi Arena
September 13, 2000	Hartford	United States	XL Center
September 15, 2000	Washington, D.C.	United States	MCI Center
September 16, 2000	New York City	United States	Madison Square Garden
September 17, 2000	Worcester	United States	Worcester's Centrum Centre
September 20, 2000	Philadelphia	United States	First Union Center
September 22, 2000	Indianapolis	United States	Conseco Fieldhouse
September 23, 2000	St. Louis	United States	Savvis Center
September 24, 2000	Kansas City	United States	Kemper Arena
September 26, 2000	North Little Rock	United States	Alltel Arena
September 28, 2000	Milwaukee	United States	Bradley Center
September 29, 2000	Auburn Hills	United States	The Palace of Auburn Hills
September 30, 2000	Auburn Hills	United States	The Palace of Auburn Hills
October 7, 2000	Los Angeles	United States	Staples Center
October 8, 2000	Bakersfield	United States	Bakersfield Centennial Garden
October 11, 2000	Dallas	United States	Reunion Arena
October 13, 2000	Houston	United States	Compaq Center
October 14, 2000	Austin	United States	Frank Erwin Center
October 15, 2000	Oklahoma City	United States	Myriad Arena
October 17, 2000	Greensboro	United States	Greensboro Coliseum
October 18, 2000	Louisville	United States	Freedom Hall
November 24, 2000	Cincinnati	United States	Firstar Center
November 25, 2000	Charleston	United States	Charleston Civic Center
November 27, 2000	Madison	United States	Kohl Center
November 28, 2000	Champaign	United States	Assembly Hall
November 30, 2000	East Rutherford	United States	Continental Airlines Arena
December 1, 2000	Baltimore	United States	Baltimore Arena
December 3, 2000	Richmond	United States	Richmond Coliseum
December 7, 2000	Ottawa	Canada	Corel Centre
December 8, 2000	Toronto	Canada	Air Canada Centre
December 9, 2000	Rochester	United States	Blue Cross Arena
December 11, 2000	North Charleston	United States	North Charleston Coliseum
December 12, 2000	Orlando	United States	TD Waterhouse Center
