= Piece of My Heart (disambiguation) =

"Piece of My Heart" is a song written by Jerry Ragovoy and Bert Berns, best known through performances by Janis Joplin.

Piece of My Heart may also refer to:

== Film and television ==
- Piece of My Heart (film), a 2009 New Zealand film
- A Piece of My Heart (film), a 2019 Swedish film
- "Piece of My Heart" (Grey's Anatomy), a television episode

== Literature ==
- Piece of My Heart (novel), a 2006 Inspector Banks novel by Peter Robinson
- Piece of My Heart, a 2020 Under Suspicion novel by Mary Higgins Clark and Alafair Burke
- A Piece of My Heart, a 1976 novel by Richard Ford
- Piece of My Heart: A Lesbian of Colour Anthology, a 1991 book edited by Makeda Silvera

== Music ==
- "Piece of My Heart" (Intermission song), 1993
- "Piece of My Heart" (Tara Kemp song), 1991
- "Piece of My Heart" (Wizkid song), 2024
- Piece of My Heart, a 1996 album by Faith Hill
- "A Piece of My Heart", a song by Gang of Four from Hard
- Piece of My Heart: The Bert Berns Story, a 2014 jukebox musical
