= She Moves =

American pop trio

- Origin: United States
- Genres: Pop
- Years active: 1997-1999
- Label: Geffen Records
- Past members: Carla Duren; Danielle Flora; Diana Bologna

She Moves was an American pop trio consisting of Carla Duren, Diana Bologna and Danielle Flora, formed in 1997 by German pop producers the Berman Brothers. The trio, all former dancers for the New York Knicks, are perhaps best known for their one-hit wonder "Breaking All The Rules", a dance-pop track which achieved moderate success in late 1997, peaking at No. 32 on the Billboard Hot 100.

== History ==
All three members of She Moves met as and were former New York Knicks dancers. Danielle got her industry start as a background dancer and co-host of the popular 1990s MTV show The Grind, while Diana had danced earlier in music videos for Salt N Pepa, Lil' Kim and Missy Elliott.

In 1997, the German-born, New York-based producers the Berman Brothers—who had already produced Real McCoy's multi-platinum-selling debut—formed She Moves, months after hearing Carla Duren wow the crowd at Madison Square Garden before a playoff game with a soulful, a cappella rendition of the national anthem.

In the summer of 1997, the group released their debut single, "Breaking All the Rules". It peaked at #32 on the Billboard Hot 100. On November 18, 1997, their debut album of the same title was released. Sales were poor, despite the successful airplay of the lead single on radio, and video rotation on BET and MTV. The group promoted the single by performing during the swimsuit competition at Miss USA 1998. Their label, Geffen Records, released the second single "It's Your Love", a remake of the country music hit by Tim McGraw and Faith Hill. They released a third single from the album, "Just for Tonight", which failed to chart in the US; however, it later managed to become a minor hit in Sweden. The girls also appeared in a Saturday Night Live sketch.

She Moves was dropped from Geffen Records in 1999, following a lack of momentum in their music.

== Solo careers ==
Danielle went on to become a successful choreographer, working with pop icon Janet Jackson on mtvICON for her showcase episode, as well as the MTV Video Music Awards and for Saturday Night Live (NBC). She also hosted two shows for Billboard, "Billboard in Sixty" and "Billboard Underground" . , as well as appearances on The Tonight Show and Lip Sync Battle, to name a few.

On Broadway, Carla performed the role of Snookie in 110 in the Shade. She released her debut album, titled BlackFolkRockStar, on CD Baby.

Diana is an actress and appeared in the feature film Brooklyn's Finest (2009), as well as two television series, HBO's Flight of the Conchords and the long-running soap opera As the World Turns.

== Discography ==
=== Albums ===
- 1997: Breaking All the Rules

=== Singles ===
Year	Title	Chart Positions		Album
Year	Title	US	SWE	Album
1997	"Breaking All the Rules"	32	11	Breaking All the Rules
1998	"It's Your Love"	67	—	Breaking All the Rules
1998	"Just for Tonight"	—	23	Breaking All the Rules
