= The Hits (Faith Hill album) =

Greatest hits album by Faith Hill
- Released: October 2, 2007
- Recorded: 1993–2007
- Genre: Country
- Length: 59:10
- Label: Warner Bros. Nashville
- Producer: Gary Burr; Mike Clute; Byron Gallimore; Scott Hendricks; Faith Hill; Dann Huff

Faith Hill chronology
Fireflies (2005)	The Hits (2007)	Joy to the World (2008)

Singles from The Hits
- 1. "Lost" Released: June 19, 2007; 2. "Red Umbrella" Released: September 13, 2007

Professional ratings
Review scores
Source	Rating
About.com	4/5 stars
Allmusic	4/5 stars

The Hits is the first greatest hits album by American country music singer Faith Hill issued in the United States. Originally slated for release on May 8, 2007, the album was delayed several times until it was finally released on October 2, 2007.

Hill initially planned to re-record her prior hits for the album:

It’s been difficult selecting the songs for The Hits. But when we decided to focus on what you’d want, the decisions became much clearer. We’re planning on newer, different versions of some songs and we’ve got a few new surprises on The Hits. Leave it to me, I would’ve made a whole album of surprises, but then it wouldn’t have been The Hits and it wouldn’t be coming out on October 2nd.

Ultimately, the live version of "Stronger" (an album track from Cry), a more country sounding "Let Me Let Go" and pop remixes of "Breathe", "The Way You Love Me", and "This Kiss" are the only tracks that differ from their album versions. The album contains all eight of her solo No. 1 Country singles in addition to two songs, "Cry" (No. 12 Country) and "There You'll Be" (No. 11 Country), which topped the AC chart.

== History ==
The first single, "Lost" was released in May, 2007. The song did not perform well on the Country charts peaking at #32. In September 2007, the song was released to AC radio and has peaked at #11 in January 2008. Faith debuted the second and final new track from the album, "Red Umbrella", on The Ellen DeGeneres Show on September 5. The song was released to Country radio on September 13. It peaked at #28 on the country charts. The album also features her Grammy nominated duet with Tim McGraw "I Need You".

The album debuted at #12 on the Billboard 200 and #3 on the Country Albums charts selling 69,368 copies in its first week. This became her lowest debuting album on the Billboard 200 since 1995's It Matters to Me. A special edition of the CD was also released with a companion DVD featuring videos of some of Hill's singles.

In April 2009, after 18 months on chart, the album moved to the Billboard Top Country Catalog Albums. As of the chart dated March 9, 2013, the album has sold 446,055 copies in the US.

== Track listing ==
No.	Title	Writer(s)	Producer(s)	Length
1.	"Red Umbrella" (New recording)	Aimee Mayo; Chris Lindsey; Brett Warren; Brad Warren	Byron Gallimore; Faith Hill	3:39
2.	"Stronger" (Live, from Cry)	Hillary Lindsey; Troy Verges	Gallimore; Hill	6:15
3.	"I Need You" (with Tim McGraw, from Let It Go)	David Lee; Tony Lane	Gallimore; Tim McGraw; Darran Smith	4:09
4.	"Lost" (New recording)	Kara DioGuardi; Mitch Allan	Gallimore; Hill	4:11
5.	"Mississippi Girl" (from Fireflies)	John Rich; Adam Shoenfeld	Gallimore; Dann Huff; Hill	3:53
6.	"Cry" (from Cry)	Angie Aparo	Marti Frederiksen; Hill	3:48
7.	"There You'll Be" (from Pearl Harbor Soundtrack)	Diane Warren	Trevor Horn; Gallimore	3:42
8.	"The Way You Love Me" (Radio Remix, from Breathe)	Keith Follesé; Michael Dulaney	Gallimore; Hill	3:29
9.	"Breathe" (Pop Version, from Breathe)	Stephanie Bentley; Holly Lamar	Gallimore; Hill	4:08
10.	"The Secret of Life" (from Faith)	Gretchen Peters	Hill; Gallimore	4:15
11.	"Let Me Let Go" (from Faith)	Steve Diamond; Dennis Morgan	Hill; Huff	4:25
12.	"This Kiss" (Pop Version, from Faith)	Beth Nielsen Chapman; Robin Lerner; Annie Roboff	Hill; Gallimore	3:15
13.	"It Matters to Me" (from It Matters to Me)	Ed Hill; Mark D. Sanders	Scott Hendricks; Hill	3:18
14.	"Piece of My Heart" (from Take Me as I Am)	Jerry Ragovoy; Bert Berns	Hendricks	4:02
15.	"Wild One" (from Take Me as I Am)	Pat Bunch; Jaime Kyle; Will Rambeaux	Hendricks	2:47
Total length:				59:10

Special Edition bonus DVD
No.	Title	Director	Length
1.	"Mississippi Girl"	Wayne Isham
2.	"Cry"	Mike Lipscombe
3.	"The Way You Love Me"	Joseph Kahn
4.	"Breathe"	Lili Fini Zanuck
5.	"The Secret of Life"	Steven Goldmann
6.	"Just to Hear You Say That You Love Me" (with Tim McGraw)	Jim Shea
7.	"Let Me Let Go"	Peter Nydrle
8.	"This Kiss"	Steven Goldmann
9.	"It Matters to Me"	Randee St. Nicholas
10.	"Piece of My Heart"	Deaton Flanigen
11.	"Wild One"	Neil Burger

== Personnel ==
- David Angell – violin
- Greg Barnhill – background vocals
- Stephanie Bentley – background vocals
- Bruce Bouton – steel guitar
- Bekka Bramlett – background vocals
- Mike Brignardello – bass guitar
- Dean Brown – fiddle, mandolin
- Pat Buchanan – electric guitar
- Tom Bukovac – acoustic guitar, electric guitar
- Paul Bushnell – bass guitar
- Larry Byrom – acoustic guitar
- David Campbell – string arrangements, conductor
- John Catchings – cello
- Beth Nielson Chapman – background vocals
- Lisa Cochran – background vocals
- Vinnie Colaiuta – drums
- Perry Coleman – background vocals
- Bill Coumo – synthesizer
- Eric Darken – percussion
- David Davidson – violin
- Chip Davis – background vocals
- Dan Dugmore – electric guitar, steel guitar, lap steel guitar, soloist
- Glen Duncan – fiddle
- Stuart Duncan – fiddle, mandolin
- David Dunkley – percussion
- Connie Ellisor – violin
- Shannon Forrest – drums, percussion
- Paul Franklin – Dobro, steel guitar
- Marti Frederiksen – acoustic guitar, electric guitar, background vocals
- Byron Gallimore – 12-string acoustic guitar, 12-string electric guitar, acoustic guitar, electric guitar, drum loops
- Sonny Garrish – steel guitar
- Vince Gill – background vocals
- Carl Gorodetzky – violin
- Jim Grosjean – viola
- Aubrey Haynie – fiddle
- Tom Hemby – gut string guitar
- Denny Hemingson – electric guitar, steel guitar
- Faith Hill – lead vocals
- Steve Hornbeak – background vocals
- Dann Huff – electric guitar
- John Barlow Jarvis – piano
- Mary Ann Kennedy – background vocals
- Jeff King – electric guitar
- Michael Landau – electric guitar
- Lee Larrison – violin
- Tim Lauer – accordion
- Paul Leim – drums
- Chris Lindsey – piano
- B. James Lowry – electric guitar
- Mark Luna – background vocals
- Tim McGraw – duet vocals on "I Need You"
- Chris McHugh – drums
- Jeff McMahon – Fender Rhodes
- Terry McMillan – percussion
- Jerry McPherson – electric guitar
- Anthony LaMarchina – cello
- John Marcus – bass guitar
- Billy Mason – drums
- Bob Mason – cello
- Brent Mason – electric guitar
- Bob Minner – acoustic guitar
- Jamie Muhoberac – Hammond B-3 organ, piano, programming, synthesizer, synthesizer programming
- Cate Myer – violin
- Steve Nathan – keyboards, synthesizer
- Craig Nelson – bass guitar
- Jimmy Nichols – keyboards, Hammond B-3 organ
- Gary Van Osdale – viola
- Mary Kathryn Van Osdale – violin
- Monet Owens – background vocals
- Richard Pagano – drums
- Kim Parent – background vocals
- Tim Pierce – electric guitar
- Kathryn Plummer – viola
- Don Potter – acoustic guitar
- Michael Rhodes – bass guitar
- Chris Rodriguez – background vocals
- Pam Rose – background vocals
- Darrell Scott – mandolin
- Tony Shanahan – bass guitar
- Ira Siegel – acoustic guitar
- Pam Sixfin – violin
- Darren Smith – electric guitar
- Karen Staley – background vocals
- Crystal Taliefero – background vocals
- Julia Tanner – cello
- Alan Umstead – violin
- Catherine Umstead – violin
- Billy Joe Walker Jr. – acoustic guitar
- Cindy Richardson-Walker – background vocals
- Biff Watson – acoustic guitar
- Lari White – background vocals
- Kris Wilkinson – string arrangements, viola
- Lonnie Wilson – drums
- Glenn Worf – bass guitar
- Curtis Young – background vocals

== Release history ==
Country	Date
Italy	September 28, 2007
United States	October 2, 2007

== Chart performance ==
=== Weekly charts ===
Chart (2007–2015)	Peak position
UK Country Compilation Albums (OCC)	2
US Billboard 200	12
US Top Country Albums (Billboard)	3

=== Year-end charts ===
Chart (2007)	Position
US Top Country Albums (Billboard)	68
Chart (2008)	Position
US Top Country Albums (Billboard)	51
