= Come Home (OneRepublic song) =

Song by Ryan Tedder

Single by OneRepublic and Sara Bareilles

from the album Dreaming Out Loud
- Released: July 14, 2009
- Recorded: 2005–2007; 2009
- Length: 4:29 (album version); 4:18 (single version)
- Label: Mosley; Interscope
- Songwriter: Ryan Tedder
- Producer: Ryan Tedder

OneRepublic singles chronology
"Mercy" (2008)	"Come Home" (2009)	"All the Right Moves" (2009)

Sara Bareilles singles chronology
"Gravity" (2009)	"Come Home" (2009)	"King of Anything" (2010)

"Come Home" is a song by OneRepublic frontman Ryan Tedder for the band's debut album, Dreaming Out Loud (2007). The piano-based ballad features orchestral flourishes, and lyrically revolves around the eponymous pleading hook "Come home, come home". Some reviewers felt the song had political undertones as an appeal to recall American troops as Tedder had written the song about a friend serving overseas. "Come Home" was highlighted as a refreshing change of pace from the many similar-sounding songs composing Dreaming Out Loud.

In 2009, the song was remastered featuring singer-songwriter Sara Bareilles, and this version was issued digitally as the album's fifth and final single. The song debuted at number 80 on the Billboard Hot 100 the week of July 14 before dropping off the chart the following week due to a lack of promotion. The song was never serviced to radio, and failed to chart outside the U.S. "Come Home" was featured on episodes of Gossip Girl, The Vampire Diaries, and Cold Case and the film Easy A.

== Critical and commercial reception ==
Digital Spy's Nick Levine praised the song for standing out from the non-memorable "Fray-style piano-rock" of the majority of Dreaming Out Loud thanks to the effective pairing of its somber lyrics and ballad-style approach. Reviewing the song for its Song of the Week segment, a blogger of The Reflective Inklings lauded the combination of Tedder and Bareilles's voices in the single remix, noting that it put a refreshing spin the "already-good" track. Sputnik Music and the About.com Top 40 page both labelled "Come Home" as an album highlight, with the former crediting the track for giving the end of the front-loaded album some life.

Receiving no promotion beyond its digital release, "Come Home" was not nearly as successful as the album's first two singles, peaking at number 80 during its sole week on the Hot 100.

Chart (2009)	Peak position
Billboard Hot 100	80

=== Certifications ===
Region	Certification	Certified units/sales
United States (RIAA)	Gold	500,000^{‡}
^{‡} Sales+streaming figures based on certification alone.

== Faith Hill version ==
"Come Home"

Single by Faith Hill
- Released: November 9, 2011
- Genre: Country pop
- Length: 5:38
- Label: Warner Bros. Nashville
- Songwriter: Ryan Tedder
- Producers: Byron Gallimore; Faith Hill

Faith Hill singles chronology
"A Baby Changes Everything" (2008)	"Come Home" (2011)	"American Heart" (2012)

American country singer Faith Hill covered the song in 2011, drawing on power pop and country pop influences. Hill premiered her version at the 45th CMA Awards, which was subsequently released on November 9, 2011, as the lead single for a planned seventh studio album titled Illusion (which, in turn, was scrapped), as well as her first non-holiday single release since 2007's "Red Umbrella".

=== Critical reception ===
Reviews for Hill's version of "Come Home" were mixed to positive, with most criticism targeting the production. Billboard gave the song a lukewarm reception, describing Hill's performance as "dead-on" and demonstrative of the "dramatic tones" of her voice, but felt the production was overpowering and that the song "never gets totally off the ground". In a similar vein, Ben Foster of The 1-to-10 Country Music Review lamented the "bloated power pop arrangement", and felt that "Come Home" failed to evoke the "vibrancy and sonic stickiness of Hill's best pop-country efforts". Though describing the song as a letdown, Foster did highlight Hill's redeeming vocals and "strong interpretive abilities".

Matt Bjorke of Roughstock was more complimentary, calling the song "one of the best vocals of Faith Hill's career" and applauding Hill for crafting a unique melody that draws from the realms of pop and rock music. Comparing the "soaring ballad" to the works of Lady Antebellum (a comparison Bjorke also drew), Taste of Country editor Billy Dukes wrote that "Come Home" proves that even after three decades in the business, Hill is still in touch with "what's hot in Nashville" and is more than capable of producing a country hit.

=== Chart performance ===
Hill's rendition of "Come Home" debuted on the US Hot Country chart at number 35, her best opening week since "Mississippi Girl", as well as on the Hot 100 at number 82. Over its twelve-week run on the former, the song reached a peak position of number 26.

Chart (2011)	Peak position
Canada Country (Billboard)	40
US Billboard Hot 100	82
US Hot Country Songs (Billboard)	26
