= Karen Staley =

American country music singer-songwriter

- Born: Weirton, West Virginia
- Origin: Nashville, Tennessee
- Genres: Country
- Occupation: Singer-songwriter
- Instrument: Vocals
- Years active: 1984–present
- Labels: MCA; Warner Bros.

Karen Staley (born in Weirton, West Virginia) is an American country music singer-songwriter.

Staley was raised in Georgetown, Beaver County, Pennsylvania, and was inspired to write songs after reading through the hymnals at her local church. She continued to do so while at West Virginia Wesleyan College, where she joined the women's fraternity Alpha Gamma Delta. She took a job at a children's home, before moving to Los Angeles, California to sign with a contemporary Christian music label which went out of business before she could release anything.

After winning a talent competition put on by the Wheeling Jamboree, she moved to Nashville, Tennessee, where she wrote three songs on Patty Loveless's self-titled debut album. She signed to MCA Records in the late 1980's, and released the album Wildest Dreams in 1989, which produced two low-charting singles.

In the mid-late 1990s, Staley wrote "The Keeper of the Stars" for Tracy Byrd, and "Take Me as I Am" and "Let's Go to Vegas" for Faith Hill. She released Fearless in 1998 for Warner Bros. Records.

== Discography ==
=== Albums ===
Title	Album details
Wildest Dreams	Release date: January 9, 1989; Label: MCA Records; Format: LP, CD, cassette
Fearless	Release date: November 17, 1998; Label: Warner Bros. Records; Format: CD, cassette

=== Singles ===
Year	Single	Peak chart positions	Album
Year	Single	US Country	Album
1987	"Oh Lonesome Me"	—	—N/a
1988	"So Good to Be in Love"	86	Wildest Dreams
1989	"Now and Then"	87	Wildest Dreams
1998	"Somebody's Child"	—	Fearless
"—" denotes releases that did not chart
