= Breaking All the Rules (She Moves album) =

Breaking All The Rules

Studio album by She Moves
- Released: November 18, 1997
- Genre: Pop
- Length: 45:25
- Label: Geffen
- Producer: Berman Brothers

Professional ratings
Review scores
Source	Rating
Allmusic	link

Breaking All The Rules is the only album by American pop girl group She Moves. The album was released in November 1997. The Japan release included a bonus track, "Forever Young", as well as a full-color booklet with lyrics. The album contains a cover of the Tim McGraw and Faith Hill duet, "It's Your Love".

== Track listing ==
1. "Breaking All The Rules" (Christian Berman, Frank Berman, Jeff Coplan, Matt Dexter) – 3:29
2. "Wouldn't It Be Good" (Nik Kershaw) – 3:58
3. "Just For Tonight" (Berman, Berman, Coplan, Dexter) – 3:35
4. "You Make Me Believe In Magic" (Berman, Berman, M. Dexter, Kama) – 3:28
5. "Come Back to Me" (Berman, Berman, Coplan) – 4:16
6. "Do You Know" (Carla Duren, Danielle Flora, Diana Bologna) – 3:47
7. "Every Time You Touch Me" (I Get High) (Irving Berman, Coplan, Kama) – 3:36
8. "Perfect Sin" (Berman, Berman, Coplan, Flora) – 3:38
9. "It's Your Love" (Stephony Smith) – 3:51
10. "Let's Keep It Going On" (Berman, Berman, Coplan) – 3:30
11. "Homesick" (Berman, Berman, Coplan, Duren) – 3:46
12. "Breaking All The Rules" (Berman Brothers Dance Mix) – 3:36
13. "Forever Young" (Marian Gold, Bernhard Lloyd, Frank Mertens) – 3:51 (International Bonus Track)
14. "Just For Tonight" (Berman Brothers Remix) - 3:18 (Japan Only Bonus Track)

== Personnel ==
=== She Moves ===
- Carla Duren, Danielle Flora, Diana Bologna: Vocals

=== Additional musicians ===
- Dr. Mo, Matt Dexter, Touch: Keyboards, Drum Programming
- Jeff Coplan: Acoustic & Electric Guitars

== Production ==
- All Songs Arranged By She Moves, The Berman Brothers & Jeff Coplan
- Produced By The Berman Brothers
- Recorded, Engineered & Mixed By Akira Takahashi & Touch
- Mastered By Chris Gehringer
