= The Rest of Our Life (song) =

Single by Tim McGraw and Faith Hill

from the album The Rest of Our Life
- Released: October 5, 2017
- Studio: The Metal Building (Nashville, TN)
- Genre: Country pop
- Length: 3:44
- Label: Arista Nashville
- Songwriters: Steve Mac; Johnny McDaid; Ed Sheeran; Amy Wadge
- Producers: Byron Gallimore; Tim McGraw; Faith Hill

Tim McGraw singles chronology
"Speak to a Girl" (2017)	"The Rest of Our Life" (2017)	"Neon Church" (2018)

Faith Hill singles chronology
"Speak to a Girl" (2017)	"The Rest of Our Life" (2017)

Music video
- "Rest of Our Life" on YouTube

"The Rest of Our Life" is a song recorded by American country music singers Tim McGraw and Faith Hill. The song was written by Steve Mac, Johnny McDaid, Ed Sheeran and Amy Wadge.

== Background ==
The song is the title track of McGraw and Hill's duets album The Rest of Our Life, and it was written by Ed Sheeran together with Amy Wadge, Johnny McDaid and Steve Mac. According to Faith Hill, the song reminded her of the day when she and Tim McGraw decided to get married after meeting McGraw on his Spontaneous Combustion tour in 1996, when she first heard the song, and said that "there was a comfort and a security about that moment that resonates in this song." McGraw concurred and said: "It's got such an intimacy to the song, and I think that's what really attracted us as well."

The song was first released on October 5, 2017, prior to release of the album on November 17 as the second single of the album.

== Commercial performance ==
When the song was released in October 2017, the song sold 18,000 copies in its first week, allowing the song to debut on the Hot Country Songs chart at No. 25. It debuted on Country Airplay the previous week at No. 51 on the chart date of October 21, 2017. The song has sold 143,000 copies in the United States as of March 2018.

== Allegations of plagiarism ==
McGraw and Hill, as well as the writers of the song, were sued by Sean Carey and Beau Golden on allegations that it is a "blatant copying" of their song "When I Found You" recorded and co-written by Australian artist Jasmine Rae. The lawsuit asks for an injunction, at least $5 million in damages, royalties and attorney fees.

== Charts ==
=== Weekly charts ===
Chart (2017–2018)	Peak position
Canada Country (Billboard)	48
US Billboard Hot 100	98
US Country Airplay (Billboard)	25
US Hot Country Songs (Billboard)	18

=== Year-end charts ===
Chart (2018)	Position
US Hot Country Songs (Billboard)	81
