= Lost (Faith Hill song) =

Single by Faith Hill

from the album The Hits
- Released: June 19, 2007
- Genre: Country, pop
- Length: 4:13
- Label: Warner Bros. Nashville
- Songwriters: Kara DioGuardi, Mitch Allan
- Producers: Byron Gallimore, Faith Hill

Faith Hill singles chronology
"I Need You" (2007)	"Lost" (2007)	"Red Umbrella" (2007)

"Lost" is a song written by Mitch Allan and Kara DioGuardi and recorded by American country music artist Faith Hill. Hill's label, Warner Bros. Nashville, released the song on June 19, 2007, to country radio as the lead single from her first worldwide greatest hits album, The Hits (2007). The song was later released in October 2007 to adult and hot adult contemporary radio. It was one of two songs recorded for the compilation, the other being "Red Umbrella".

Due to strong digital sales, "Lost" peaked at number 61 on the Billboard Hot 100; the song however struggled at country radio, peaking at number 32 on the Hot Country Songs chart. It did have better success on A/C radio, peaking at number eleven on the Adult Contemporary chart. The song's poor performance can be attributed to the song being concurrently being released with her duet with husband Tim McGraw, "I Need You", which was still climbing at country radio. The song also never had a music video.

== Critical reception ==
Billboard gave the song a mostly positive review, saying parts of the song were similar to past singles like "Breathe", "Let Me Let Go", and "It Matters to Me", and noting that "she delivers a clever consummate message of steadfast devotion."

== Chart performance ==
"Lost" debuted the week of June 2, 2007 on the Hot Country Songs at number 48, the fourth highest debut of the week. Coincidentally, "Lost" debuted at the same time as her husband and country musician Tim McGraw's single "If You're Reading This" debuted, with that song being the highest debut of the week. The song slowly rose to a peak position of number 32 and spent thirteen weeks on the chart, becoming her 31st consecutive top forty hit on the country charts. The song also had minor success in Canada, peaking at number 43 on the Canada Country chart and spending ten weeks on it.

"Lost" debuted on the all-genre Billboard Hot 100 at number 61 on July 7, 2007. The song charted mainly due to digital downloads, which lead to an appearance at number 40 on the Digital Songs chart. The song would only spend two weeks on the chart before falling off. "Lost" had more success in Canada, peaking at number 40 on the Canadian Hot 100 chart and spending four weeks before exiting.

"Lost" had its biggest success on the Adult Contemporary chart, entering the week of October 13, 2007 at number 25. The song reached its peak of number eleven on the chart the week of January 19, 2008, spending 21 weeks on the chart.

== Charts ==
=== Weekly charts ===
Chart (2007–2008)	Peak position
Canada Country (Billboard)	43
Canada Hot 100 (Billboard)	40
US Billboard Hot 100	61
US Adult Contemporary (Billboard)	11
US Hot Country Songs (Billboard)	32
US Billboard Pop 100	51

=== Year-end charts ===
Chart (2008)	Position
US Adult Contemporary (Billboard)	40
