= Take Me as I Am (Faith Hill song) =

Single by Faith Hill

from the album Take Me as I Am
- B-side: "I Can't Do That Anymore"
- Released: September 12, 1994
- Recorded: 1993
- Genre: Country
- Length: 3:17
- Label: Warner Bros. Nashville
- Songwriters: Bob DiPiero; Karen Staley
- Producer: Scott Hendricks

Faith Hill singles chronology
"But I Will" (1994)	"Take Me as I Am" (1994)	"Let's Go to Vegas" (1995)

"Take Me as I Am" is a song written by Bob DiPiero and Karen Staley, and recorded by American country music artist Faith Hill. It was released in September 1994 by Warner Bros. Nashville as the fourth and final single and title track from her album of the same name (1993). The song peaked at number two on the US Billboard country singles charts, behind Joe Diffie's "Pickup Man", and number two on the RPM country charts in Canada.

== Critical reception ==
Larry Flick from Billboard magazine wrote, "Cleanup single from Hill's smash debut takes full advantage of her sunny style and impressive vocal range. Sure to please radio, this single should set the stage for her upcoming sophomore effort."

== Music video ==
A music video was produced to promote the single, directed by Deaton Flanigen, and premiered in late 1994.

== Charts ==
Chart (1994)	Peak position
Canada Country Singles (RPM)	2
US Hot Country Songs (Billboard)	2
