= Breaking All the Rules (She Moves song) =

Single by She Moves

from the album Breaking All the Rules
- Released: November 4, 1997
- Recorded: 1997
- Genre: Funk; hi-NRG; techno-pop
- Length: 3:28 (lp version); 3:41 (radio mix)
- Label: Geffen
- Songwriters: Christian Berman; Frank Berman; Jeff Coplan; Matt Dexter
- Producers: The Berman Brothers; Peter Amato; Jeff Coplan

She Moves singles chronology
"Breaking All the Rules" (1997)	"It's Your Love" (1998)

"Breaking All the Rules" is a song by American girl group She Moves, released in November 1997, by Geffen Records, as their debut single from their first album by the same name (1997) in the United States. It quickly reached its peak of number 32 on the Billboard Hot 100 on the week ending December 13 of that year and spent a total of twenty weeks on the chart. It was their only hit in the United States, officially making them a one-hit wonder. In Europe, the single was also successful, peaking at number 11 in Sweden and number 31 in the Netherlands. The accompanying music video was directed by Jamie King.

== Critical reception ==
Larry Flick from Billboard magazine wrote that the song showed the girl group "floating light and airy harmonies over a thumping beat and blindingly bright keyboards. In the writing and production of the song, the Berman Brothers have wisely crafted faux-funk and giddy hi-NRG versions to accommodate the fickle, varying needs of pop radio, while the red-hot remix team of Ernie Lake and Bobby Guy toughens the bassline, adding a bit of club credibility. In all, a solid, highly marketable package from an act that you will likely be hearing quite a bit of in the coming months." Gerald Martinez from New Sunday Times declared it as a tune "well worth listening to", noting its "techno-pop".

== Formats and track listings ==
- CD single
1. "Breaking All the Rules" (LP Version) – 3:28
2. "Breaking All the Rules" (Radio Mix) – 3:41
3. "Breaking All the Rules" (Bass Rules Mix) – 3:30
4. "Breaking All the Rules" (Berman Brothers Dance Mix) – 3:38
5. "Breaking All the Rules" (Soul Solution Radio Mix) – 3:19
6. "Breaking All the Rules" (Soul Solution Club Mix) – 7:17
7. "Breaking All the Rules" (Soul Solution Dub Mix) – 5:48
- 12" maxi
1. "Breaking All the Rules" (Soul Solution Club Mix) – 7:18
2. "Breaking All the Rules" (Soul Solution Dub Mix) – 5:47
3. "Breaking All the Rules" (Berman Brothers 12" Mix) – 5:55
4. "Breaking All the Rules" (Bass Rules Mix) – 3:29
- CD maxi
1. "Breaking All the Rules" (LP Version) – 3:28
2. "Breaking All the Rules" (Radio Mix) – 3:41
3. "Breaking All the Rules" (Bass Rules Mix) – 3:30
4. "Breaking All the Rules" (Berman Brothers Dance Mix) – 3:38
5. "Breaking All the Rules" (Soul Solution Radio Mix) – 3:19
6. "Breaking All the Rules" (Soul Solution Club Mix) – 7:17
7. "Breaking All the Rules" (Soul Solution Dub Mix) – 5:48
- CD maxi - Remixes
1. "Breaking All the Rules" (Soul Solution Club Mix) – 7:18
2. "Breaking All the Rules" (Soul Solution Dub Mix) – 5:47
3. "Breaking All the Rules" (Berman Brothers 12" Mix) – 5:55
4. "Breaking All the Rules" (Bass Rules Mix) – 3:30

== Charts ==
Chart (1997)	Peak positions
Canada Top Singles (RPM)	43
Netherlands (Dutch Top 40)	31
Netherlands (Single Top 100)	41
Sweden (Sverigetopplistan)	11
US Billboard Hot 100	32
US Top 40 Mainstream (Billboard)	16
US Hot Dance Music/Maxi-Singles Sales (Billboard)	7
