= It Matters to Me =

Studio album by Faith Hill
- Released: August 29, 1995
- Recorded: 1994–1995
- Studio: Sound Shop (Nashville, Tennessee)
- Genre: Country
- Length: 36:00
- Label: Warner Bros. Nashville
- Producer: Scott Hendricks; Faith Hill

Faith Hill chronology
Take Me as I Am (1993)	It Matters to Me (1995)	Faith (1998)

Singles from It Matters to Me
- 1. "Let's Go to Vegas" Released: July 21, 1995; 2. "It Matters to Me" Released: November 6, 1995; 3. "Someone Else's Dream" Released: February 1996; 4. "You Can't Lose Me" Released: April 1996; 5. "I Can't Do That Anymore" Released: October 7, 1996

It Matters to Me is the second studio album by American country music artist Faith Hill. It was released in August 1995 via Warner Bros. Records Nashville. Having been certified 4× Platinum by Recording Industry Association of America (RIAA) for shipments of four million copies, it produced five Top 10 singles on the Billboard Hot Country Songs charts: "Let's Go to Vegas", the title track, "Someone Else's Dream", "You Can't Lose Me", and "I Can't Do That Anymore".

== Critical reception ==
Professional ratings
Review scores
Source	Rating
Allmusic	4/5 stars
Entertainment Weekly	B
Los Angeles Times	2.5/4 stars
The Rolling Stone Album Guide	1.5/5 stars

== Track listing ==
No.	Title	Writer(s)	Length
1.	"Someone Else's Dream"	Trey Bruce; Craig Wiseman	3:37
2.	"Let's Go to Vegas"	Karen Staley	3:11
3.	"It Matters to Me"	Ed Hill; Mark D. Sanders	3:17
4.	"Bed of Roses"	Jaime Kyle; Will Rambeaux	3:05
5.	"A Man's Home Is His Castle"	Ariel Caten	4:16
6.	"You Can't Lose Me"	Bruce; Thom McHugh	3:52
7.	"I Can't Do That Anymore"	Alan Jackson	4:03
8.	"A Room in My Heart"	Sunny Russ	3:53
9.	"You Will Be Mine"	Rob Honey	3:15
10.	"Keep Walkin' On" (with Shelby Lynne)	Staley; Tricia Walker	3:28
Total length:			36:00

== Personnel ==
- Gary Carter – pedal steel guitar
- Ashley Cleveland – background vocals
- Bill Cuomo – synthesizer
- Dan Dugmore – pedal steel guitar, lap steel guitar
- Paul Franklin – pedal steel guitar
- Trey Gray – drums
- Lisa Gregg – background vocals
- Rob Hajacos – fiddle
- John Hobbs – piano, Hammond B-3 organ
- Steve Hornbeak – background vocals
- Dann Huff – electric guitar
- Robert Johnson – background vocals
- Anthony Joyner – bass guitar
- Elaine Krisle – piano
- Carl Marsh – synthesizer
- Brent Mason – electric guitar
- Wendell Mobley – background vocals
- Matt Rollings – piano
- Pam Rose – background vocals
- Tom Rutledge – acoustic guitar
- Michael Spriggs – acoustic guitar
- Karen Staley – background vocals
- Harry Stinson – background vocals
- Russ Taff – background vocals
- Lou Toomey – electric guitar
- Billy Joe Walker Jr. – acoustic guitar
- Cindy Richardson Walker – background vocals
- Dennis Wilson – background vocals
- Lonnie Wilson – drums
- Glenn Worf – bass guitar
- Reese Wynans – piano, Hammond B-3 organ

Hand claps on "Keep Walkin' On" performed by Mark Capps, Bill Cuomo, Paul Franklin, Darrell Franklin, Scott Hendricks, Faith Hill, Brent Mason, Michelle Perry, Michael Spriggs, Lonnie Wilson, and Glenn Worf.

== Charts ==
=== Weekly charts ===
Chart (1995–1996)	Peak position
Canadian Albums (RPM)	40
Canadian Country Albums (RPM)	2
US Billboard 200	29
US Top Country Albums (Billboard)	4
US Cashbox Top Albums	27

=== Year-end charts ===
Chart (1995)	Position
US Top Country Albums (Billboard)	58
Chart (1996)	Position
US Billboard 200	61
US Top Country Albums (Billboard)	10
Chart (1997)	Position
US Top Country Albums (Billboard)	32

== Certifications ==
Region	Certification	Certified units/sales
Canada (Music Canada)	4× Platinum	400,000^{^}
United States (RIAA)	4× Platinum	4,000,000^{^}
^{^} Shipments figures based on certification alone.
