= I Can't Do That Anymore =

Single by Faith Hill

from the album It Matters To Me
- B-side: "Take Me as I Am"
- Released: October 7, 1996
- Recorded: 1995
- Studio: Sound Shop Recording Studios (Nashville, TN)
- Genre: Country
- Length: 4:04
- Label: Warner Bros. Nashville
- Songwriter: Alan Jackson
- Producers: Scott Hendricks and Faith Hill

Faith Hill singles chronology
"You Can't Lose Me" (1996)	"I Can't Do That Anymore" (1996)	"It's Your Love" (1997)

"I Can't Do That Anymore" is a song written by Alan Jackson, and recorded by American country music artist Faith Hill. It was released in October 1996 as the fifth and final single from Hill's It Matters to Me album. The song peaked at number 8 on the Billboard Country charts in 1997.

== Content ==
The song focuses on the female narrator, who sacrifices her individuality by giving up a job, cutting her hair, and tending to household chores in an attempt to satisfy her husband. Finally, she demands acknowledgment for her deeds, saying that she can no longer do what she has been doing, because "a woman needs a little something of her own". In their 2003 book The Women of Country Music, authors Charles K. Wolfe and James Edward Akenson describe the song as "continuing on the topic of self-reflexive exploration" which Hill had built on by previous singles such as "But I Will".

While on tour with Jackson in 1994, Hill asked him to write a song for her second album. She rejected the first song that he presented to her, but accepted "I Can't Do That Anymore" after he presented it to her. When Jackson's wife read the song's lyrics, she asked if the song was about her.

== Music video ==
The video, directed by Jon Small, was filmed on location in Los Angeles. It depicts Hill as a young newlywed whose husband has just moved the couple out west in hopes of striking oil. The footage was edited into two separate videos. The storyline is virtually the same in both versions, but with two completely different outcomes. In one version, Hill grows frustrated with her husband's neglect, and the video ends with no clear resolution (though it is assumed that she leaves him). The alternate version progresses in much the same way, until the very end. Just as Hill is ready to leave her marriage behind, the oil well finally erupts. Hill and her husband instantly forget their frustrations with each other and dance in a shower of the falling oil, a symbol of the better times that await the couple.

== Chart positions ==
"I Can't Do That Anymore" debuted at number 66 on the U.S. Billboard Hot Country Singles & Tracks for the week of October 19, 1996.

Chart (1996–1997)	Peak position
Canada Country Singles (RPM)	11
US Hot Country Songs (Billboard)	8
