= American Heart (song) =

Single by Faith Hill
- Released: October 1, 2012
- Studio: Blackbird Studio (Nashville, TN)
- Genre: Country
- Length: 3:53
- Label: Warner Bros. Nashville
- Songwriters: Jonathan Singleton; Jim Beavers
- Producers: Byron Gallimore; Faith Hill

Faith Hill singles chronology
"Come Home" (2011)	"American Heart" (2012)	"Meanwhile Back at Mama's" (2014)

Music video
- "American Heart" on YouTube

"American Heart" is a song written by Jim Beavers and Jonathan Singleton, and recorded by American country music artist Faith Hill. It was released on September 30, 2012, as the second single from a planned seventh studio album titled Illusion. However, the album was scrapped, and by 2017, Hill had left her record label. The song was announced on her Twitter account and distributed for airplay the following day. For the Twitter debut, Hill responded to questions hashtagged #askfaith prior to her weekly performance on NBC Sunday Night Football that night. Prior to the official release, many local radio stations posted samples of her song or official music video on their websites.

== Content ==
USA Today critic Elysa Gardner compared it to Dierks Bentley's "Home" when selecting it as the song of the week on October 1, 2012. Billy Dukes of the country music news website Taste of Country described the song as "a thick production made accessible by the wonder of Hill’s voice", further noting that "her performance rescues the song from drowning in cliches and heavy messages". Dukes noted that the song is targeting the same older audience that Martina McBride reached with "I'm Gonna Love You Through It". In her own words, Hill describes the song: "This song inspires. It grabs a hold of a very special place that we all have in our hearts. Times are hard and people are struggling, but our spirit as Americans always seems to prevail."

== Music video ==
The music video was directed by Trey Fanjoy and premiered in November 2012. The video reached the number one position on the GAC countdown in early December. On May 6, 2013, the video was nominated in the Female Video of the Year category for the 2013 CMT Music Awards.

== Chart performance ==
"American Heart" debuted at number 57 on the U.S. Billboard Hot Country Songs chart for the week of October 6, 2012.

Chart (2012)	Peak position
US Country Airplay (Billboard)	26
US Hot Country Songs (Billboard)	35
