= You Can't Lose Me =

Single by Faith Hill

from the album It Matters to Me
- Released: July 1, 1996
- Studio: Sound Shop Recording Studios (Nashville, TN)
- Genre: Country
- Length: 3:52
- Label: Warner Bros. Nashville
- Songwriters: Trey Bruce, Thom McHugh
- Producers: Scott Hendricks and Faith Hill

Faith Hill singles chronology
"Someone Else's Dream" (1996)	"You Can't Lose Me" (1996)	"I Can't Do That Anymore" (1996)

"You Can't Lose Me" is a song written by Trey Bruce and Thom McHugh, and recorded by American country music artist Faith Hill. It was released on July 1, 1996 as the fourth single from her second album, It Matters to Me (1995). It peaked at number six on the US Billboard Hot Country Songs chart in 1996, and was a number one hit on the RPM Top Country Tracks charts in Canada.

== Critical reception ==
Deborah Evans Price from Billboard wrote, "Hill explores different shades and textures of her voice on this positive, uptempo tune. Alternately vulnerable on the verses and gusty on the chorus, Hill really sells this song about maternal love and devotion, which brings home the message that real love weathers all of life's different seasons. The upbeat lyric and solid production should make this a summertime radio smash." Wendy Newcomer from Cash Box noted, "The single version of "You Can't Lose Me" is somewhat of a departure from the album version. Less conservative, it's a raw, unpolished performance from Hill that better showcases her live performances. Hill incorporates more soul and spirit into this fresh radio mix."

== Music video ==
An alternate mix was used for the song's music video, which features Hill with women and girls of all ages, all dressed in white, celebrating their femininity on a beach. Faith has stated that this is one of her favorite videos she has made.

== Charts ==
Chart (1996)	Peak position
Canada Country Singles (RPM)	1
US Hot Country Songs (Billboard)	6

=== Year-end charts ===
Chart (1996)	Position
Canada Country Tracks (RPM)	23
US Country Songs (Billboard)	61
