= It's Your Love =

1997 single by Tim McGraw and Faith Hill

Single by Tim McGraw and Faith Hill

from the album Everywhere
- B-side: "She Never Lets It Go to Her Heart"
- Released: May 12, 1997
- Recorded: 1997
- Studio: LOUD Recording (Nashville, TN)
- Genre: Country
- Length: 3:47
- Label: Curb
- Songwriter: Stephony Smith
- Producers: Byron Gallimore; Tim McGraw; James Stroud

Tim McGraw singles chronology
"Maybe We Should Just Sleep on It" (1996)	"It's Your Love" (1997)	"Everywhere" (1997)

Faith Hill singles chronology
"I Can't Do That Anymore" (1996)	"It's Your Love" (1997)	"This Kiss" (1998)

"It's Your Love"

Single by She Moves

from the album Breaking All the Rules
- Released: February 13, 1998
- Recorded: 1997
- Genre: Pop rock
- Length: 3:00
- Label: Geffen; EMI
- Songwriter: Stephony Smith
- Producer: The Berman Brothers

She Moves singles chronology
"Breaking All the Rules" (1997)	"It's Your Love" (1998)	"Just for Tonight" (1998)

"It's Your Love" is a song written by Stephony Smith and originally recorded by American country music artist Tim McGraw. Released in May 1997 as the lead single from his album Everywhere, the song, featuring his wife Faith Hill, reached number one on the Billboard Hot Country Songs chart in its fifth week and stayed there for six weeks (the first time a song spent that many weeks there since Waylon Jennings's "Luckenbach, Texas (Back to the Basics of Love)" in 1977); it also became McGraw's and Hill's first top-ten hit on the Billboard Hot 100, peaking at number seven. American pop trio She Moves covered the song in 1998, and the song has also been covered by artists such as Gil Ofarim, Tommy Page, LMNT, Natural, Cyndi Almouzni (under the stage name Cherie), Jo O'Meara, and Ruben Studdard.

"It's Your Love" became the first duet by a married couple to top the country chart since the inception of Nielsen BDS in 1990. No such single would top the chart again until almost 26 years later, when Kane and Katelyn Brown's "Thank God" topped the chart in February 2023.

== Music video ==
The music video was directed and produced by Sherman Halsey, and premiered on CMT on May 14, 1997, when CMT named it a "Hot Shot". Hill was pregnant with the couple's oldest daughter Gracie Katherine when it was filmed.

== Track listing ==
Promo CD

1. It's Your Love (Hot A/C Mix)

Single

1. It's Your Love 3:40
2. She Never Lets It Go To Her Heart 3:02

== In popular culture ==
Canadian country artist Madeline Merlo sampled "It's Your Love" on her 2023 single "Tim + Faith". The song is intended to be a tribute to McGraw and Hill, while using "It's Your Love" as the inspiration.

== Awards ==
=== Academy of Country Music Awards ===
Award	Result
Single of the Year	Won
Song of the Year	Won
Video of the Year	Won
Vocal Event of the Year	Won

=== Country Music Association ===
Award	Result
Vocal Event of the Year	Won

=== Grammy Awards ===
Award	Result
Best Country Collaboration	Nominated
Best Country Song (songwriter)	Nominated

== Charts ==
=== Tim McGraw and Faith Hill version ===
Chart (1997)	Peak position
Canada Country Singles (RPM)	1
US Billboard Hot 100	7
US Hot Country Songs (Billboard)	1
US Top Country Singles Sales (Billboard)	1

==== Year-end charts ====
Chart (1997)	Position
Canada Country Tracks (RPM)	2
US Billboard Hot 100	40
US Country Songs (Billboard)	1

=== She Moves version ===
Chart (1997–1998)	Peak position
US Billboard Hot 100	67
US Pop Airplay (Billboard)	39

== Certifications ==
Certifications for It's Your Love (Tim McGraw and Faith Hill version)
Region	Certification	Certified units/sales
United States (RIAA)	5× Platinum	5,000,000^{‡}
^{‡} Sales+streaming figures based on certification alone.
