= Someone Else's Dream =

Single by Faith Hill

from the album It Matters to Me
- Released: February 16, 1996
- Studio: Sound Shop Recording Studios (Nashville, TN)
- Genre: Country
- Length: 3:37
- Label: Warner Bros. Nashville
- Songwriters: Trey Bruce; Craig Wiseman
- Producers: Scott Hendricks; Faith Hill

Faith Hill singles chronology
"It Matters to Me" (1995)	"Someone Else's Dream" (1996)	"You Can't Lose Me" (1996)

"Someone Else's Dream" is a song co-produced and recorded by American country music artist Faith Hill. Written by Trey Bruce and Craig Wiseman and co-produced with Scott Hendricks, it was released on February 16, 1996, as the third single from her 1995 studio album It Matters to Me. The song peaked at number three on the US Hot Country Songs chart and number eight on the Canadian RPM Country Tracks.

== Critical reception ==
Deborah Evans Price from Billboard said, "Here is yet another fine cut from Hill's strong album, "It Matters to Me". This song proves you can have radio-ready uptempo tunes with meaty lyrics. Just because a song makes you tap your toes does not mean it has to be devoid of lyrical integrity. On both lyrical and musical terms, this song is a winner—thanks in large part to Hill's affecting vocals. Her country phrasing and inflection underscore the live-your-own-life message in the lyric. Great song." Wendy Newcomer from Cash Box wrote, "Finding positive and uplifting songs for female singers these days is about as easy as finding a male singer who doesn’t wear tight jeans. But Hill has found a song that fits the bill (and her sweetheart image)—she sings the heck out of it, too. If women truly are the buyers and target audience of country music, this single should hit the bullseye."

== Charts ==
=== Weekly charts ===
Chart (1996)	Peak position
Canada Country Singles (RPM)	8
US Hot Country Songs (Billboard)	3

=== Year-end charts ===
Chart (1996)	Position
Canada Country Tracks (RPM)	68
US Hot Country Songs (Billboard)	23
