= The Rest of Our Life =

Studio album by Tim McGraw and Faith Hill
- Released: November 17, 2017
- Recorded: 2016
- Studio: Blackbird Studio (Nashville, TN); Capitol Studios (Los Angeles, CA); Ocean Way Recording (Nashville, TN); The Metal Building (Nashville, TN); The House (Nashville, TN)
- Genre: Country
- Length: 44:15
- Label: Arista Nashville
- Producer: Byron Gallimore; Tim McGraw; Faith Hill

Tim McGraw chronology
Damn Country Music (2015)	The Rest of Our Life (2017)	Here on Earth (2020)

Faith Hill chronology
Deep Tracks (2016)	The Rest of Our Life (2017)

Singles from The Rest of Our Life
- 1. "Speak to a Girl" Released: March 23, 2017; 2. "The Rest of Our Life" Released: October 5, 2017

The Rest of Our Life is the first collaborative studio album by American country music artists as well as husband and wife, Tim McGraw and Faith Hill. It was released on November 17, 2017, by Arista Nashville. While the album marks McGraw's fifteenth overall studio album and Hill's eighth, it is the first collaborative album between the couple. The album is also Hill's first studio recording of original material, not including her Christmas or compilation albums, in over twelve years.

The first single from the album, "Speak to a Girl" was released on March 23, 2017 and reached number 6 on the Billboard Hot Country Songs chart. The title track was released as the second single.

== Promotion ==
Prior to the album's release, Hill and McGraw embarked upon the Soul2Soul World Tour, which included a set list composed of both artist's greatest hits and material from The Rest of Our Life. The tour continued into 2018 with the duo also headlining the C2C: Country to Country festival throughout the UK in March 2018.

Coinciding with the album's November 17 release date, an exhibit at the Country Music Hall of Fame and Museum in Nashville, titled Mississippi Woman, Louisiana Man, was opened to celebrate the careers of both Hill and McGraw.

== Critical reception ==
Giving it three out of five stars, Stephen Thomas Erlewine of AllMusic wrote that "it's an album designed to be played on lazy Sunday afternoons, on long drives, and doing housework, a soundtrack to everyday life. As such, it can veer toward background music, but it's enlivened by the chemistry between McGraw and Hill."

== Commercial performance ==
The Rest of Our Life debuted at No. 2 on the Billboard 200, and No. 1 on Top Country Albums, with 98,000 copies (104,000 album-equivalent units) sold in the first week. The album has sold 231,300 copies in the United States as of October 2018.

== Track listing ==
No.	Title	Writer(s)	Length
1.	"The Rest of Our Life"	Steve Mac; Johnny McDaid; Ed Sheeran; Amy Wadge	3:44
2.	"Telluride"	Jessi Alexander; Jon Randall	4:50
3.	"The Bed We Made"	Hillary Lindsey; Lori McKenna; Liz Rose	3:43
4.	"Cowboy Lullaby"	Brett Beavers; Brett James	5:56
5.	"Break First"	Jerry Flowers; Ashley Gorley; Emily Weisband	4:06
6.	"Love Me to Lie"	Nathan Chapman; Maureen McDonald; Hayley Warner	3:51
7.	"Sleeping in the Stars"	Jaida Dreyer; Gareth Dunlop; Mark Irwin	4:00
8.	"Damn Good at Holding On"	Barry Dean; McKenna	3:38
9.	"Devil Callin' Me Back"	Ben Caver; Jesse Frasure; Nolan Sipe	3:02
10.	"Speak to a Girl"	Shy Carter; Dave Gibson; Joe Spargur	3:54
11.	"Roll the Dice"	Carter; Bobby Hammrick; James LeBlanc; Meghan Trainor	3:31
Total length:			44:15

== Personnel ==
Adapted from AllMusic

- Tim McGraw – lead vocals
- Faith Hill – lead vocals
- Byron Gallimore – keyboards, synthesizers
- Charlie Judge – keyboards
- Erik Lutkins – keyboards, synthesizers, loop programming
- Gordon Mote – acoustic piano
- Jamie Muhoberac – keyboards, synthesizers
- Steve Nathan – keyboards, synthesizers
- Jeff Roach – keyboards, synthesizers
- Mike Rojas – keyboards, synthesizers
- Vince Gill – acoustic guitar
- Danny Rader – acoustic guitar
- Bryan Sutton – acoustic guitar
- Ilya Toshinsky – acoustic guitar
- Dann Huff – electric guitar
- David Levita – electric guitar
- Troy Lancater – electric guitar
- Michael Landau – electric guitar
- Tom Morello – electric guitar
- Derek Wells – electric guitar
- Dan Dugmore – steel guitar
- Paul Franklin – steel guitar
- Justin Schipper – steel guitar
- Paul Bushnell – bass
- Jimmie Lee Sloas – bass
- Matt Chamberlain – drums
- Shannon Forrest – drums, percussion
- David Campbell – string arrangements and conductor
- David Stone – acoustic bass
- Michael Valerio – acoustic bass
- Jacob Braun – cello
- Suzie Katayama – cello
- Timothy Landauer – cello
- Steve Richards – cello
- Matt Funes – viola
- Luke Maurer – viola
- Darrin McCann – viola
- Gerardo Hilera – violin
- Songa Lee – violin
- Natalie Leggett – violin
- Mario DeLeón – violin
- Serena McKinney – violin
- Sara Parkins – violin
- Michele Richards – violin
- Tereza Stanislav – violin
- Josefina Vergara – violin
- Greg Barnhill – backing vocals
- Ben Caver – backing vocals
- Tania Hancheroff – backing vocals
- Chris Rodriguez – backing vocals

== Charts ==
=== Weekly charts ===
Chart (2017)	Peak position
Australian Albums (ARIA)	9
Canadian Albums (Billboard)	2
New Zealand Heatseeker Albums (RMNZ)	2
Scottish Albums (OCC)	34
Swiss Albums (Schweizer Hitparade)	64
UK Albums (OCC)	80
UK Country Albums (OCC)	2
US Billboard 200	2
US Top Country Albums (Billboard)	1

=== Year-end charts ===
Chart (2018)	Position
US Billboard 200	176
US Top Country Albums (Billboard)	24
