= Speak to a Girl =

Single by Tim McGraw and Faith Hill

from the album The Rest of Our Life
- Released: March 23, 2017
- Studio: Blackbird Studio (Nashville, TN)
- Genre: Country
- Length: 3:51
- Label: Arista Nashville
- Songwriter(s): Shy Carter; Dave Gibson; Joe Spargur
- Producer(s): Byron Gallimore; Tim McGraw; Faith Hill

Tim McGraw singles chronology
"May We All" (2016)	"Speak to a Girl" (2017)	"The Rest of Our Life" (2017)

Faith Hill singles chronology
"Meanwhile Back at Mama's" (2014)	"Speak to a Girl" (2017)	"The Rest of Our Life" (2017)

Music video
- "Speak to a Girl" on YouTube

"Speak to a Girl" is a song recorded by American country music artists Tim McGraw and Faith Hill. The song was written by Shy Carter, Dave Gibson, and Joe Spargur.

The track was released on March 23, 2017, as the first single from McGraw and Hill's first ever duets album, The Rest of Our Life. McGraw and Hill performed the song live for the first time at the Academy of Country Music Awards held April 2, 2017. The song is also featured in the couple's Soul2Soul: The World Tour set list.

As of June 2017, the song has sold 200,000+ copies in the United States. According to Billboard, the song got 12.7 million first-week audience impressions.

== Charts ==
=== Weekly charts ===
Chart (2017)	Peak position
Canada Digital Songs (Billboard)	19
Canada Country (Billboard)	27
US Billboard Hot 100	61
US Country Airplay (Billboard)	19
US Hot Country Songs (Billboard)	6

=== Year-end charts ===
Chart (2017)	Position
US Hot Country Songs (Billboard)	63
