= Red Umbrella =

Single by Faith Hill

from the album The Hits
- Released: September 13, 2007
- Studio: Paragon Studios (Nashville, TN)
- Genre: Country
- Length: 3:40
- Label: Warner Bros. Nashville
- Songwriters: Chris Lindsey; Aimee Mayo; Brad Warren; Brett Warren
- Producers: Byron Gallimore; Faith Hill

Faith Hill singles chronology
"Lost" (2007)	"Red Umbrella" (2007)	"A Baby Changes Everything" (2008)

"Red Umbrella" is a song recorded by American country music singer Faith Hill. The song was written by the Warren Brothers, Aimee Mayo, and Chris Lindsey and produced by Hill and longtime collaborator Byron Gallimore. Hill debuted the song on The Ellen DeGeneres Show in early September 2007, with Warner Bros. Nashville releasing it on September 13, 2007 as the second and final single from her first worldwide greatest hits album, The Hits (2007).

Receiving mostly mixed reviews, "Red Umbrella" became yet another top-forty hit for Hill, peaking at number 28 on the Hot Country Songs chart and debuting at number 21 on the Bubbling Under Hot 100 chart. The song was also a minor number 34 hit in Canada.

== Content ==
"Red Umbrella" is an up-tempo song consisting of abstract imagery, in which the narrator explains that she will be all right despite the troubles in her life. She compares love to a "red umbrella" to cover her from the rain.

== Critical reception ==
Billboard gave Red Umbrella a positive review, saying "It's a positive love song that is uplifting and sweet, but doesn't venture too far into saccharine territory. And just when you'd think the world's songwriters might have run out of new ways to describe love, here's a fresh analogy: 'Your love is like a red umbrella/Walk the streets like Cinderella/Everyone can see it on my face.' Hill's performance is perfection."

Jim Malec of The 9513 gave the song a "thumbs down", saying "The song's verses blow by at breakneck pace, which is a good thing, considering the fact that 'Red Umbrella' has some of the most random and generally incogitative lyrics I've ever heard", although he did commend Hill's vocal performance and considered the chorus "catchy".

== Chart performance ==
Chart (2007)	Peak position
Canada Country (Billboard)	34
US Hot Country Songs (Billboard)	28
US Bubbling Under Hot 100 (Billboard)	21
US Pop 100 (Billboard)	95
