= Let's Go to Vegas =

Single by Faith Hill

from the album It Matters to Me
- B-side: "You Will Be Mine"
- Released: July 21, 1995
- Studio: Sound Shop Recording Studios (Nashville, TN)
- Genre: Country
- Length: 3:11
- Label: Warner Bros. Nashville
- Songwriter: Karen Staley
- Producers: Scott Hendricks and Faith Hill

Faith Hill singles chronology
"Take Me as I Am" (1994)	"Let's Go to Vegas" (1995)	"It Matters to Me" (1995)

Music video
- "Let's Go to Vegas" on YouTube

"Let's Go To Vegas" is a song written by Karen Staley, and recorded by American country music artist Faith Hill. It was released on July 21, 1995 as the lead single from the album It Matters to Me.

== Content ==
In the song, the protagonist persuades her lover to elope to Las Vegas.

== Music video ==
A video was released featuring Hill singing and dancing in skin tight PVC pants, a white T-shirt, and black satin outfits among typical Vegas icons such as an Elvis impersonator, Showgirls, and Casino fare.

== Chart positions ==
Chart (1995)	Peak position
Canada Country Singles (RPM)	9
US Bubbling Under Hot 100 (Billboard)	22
US Hot Country Songs (Billboard)	5
US Top Country Singles Sales (Billboard)	8

=== Year-end charts ===
Chart (1995)	Position
US Country Songs (Billboard)	67

== Release history ==
Release dates and format(s) for "Let's Go to Vegas"
Region	Date	Format(s)	Label(s)	Ref.
United States	July 21, 1995	Country radio	Warner Bros. Nashville	
