= It Matters to Me (song) =

Single by Faith Hill

from the album It Matters to Me
- B-side: "Keep Walkin' On"
- Released: November 6, 1995
- Studio: Sound Shop Recording Studios (Nashville, TN)
- Genre: Country
- Length: 3:17
- Label: Warner Bros. Nashville
- Songwriters: Ed Hill, Mark D. Sanders
- Producers: Scott Hendricks, Faith Hill

Faith Hill singles chronology
"Let's Go to Vegas" (1995)	"It Matters to Me" (1995)	"Someone Else's Dream" (1996)

Music video
- "It Matters To Me" on YouTube

"It Matters to Me" is a song written by Ed Hill and Mark D. Sanders and recorded by American country music artist Faith Hill. It was released on November 6, 1995 as the second single and title track from Hill’s second album of the same name (1995). It was her third number one on the Billboard country charts as well as her first entry on the Billboard Hot 100.

== Critical reception ==
Wendy Newcomer from Cash Box wrote, "Though she initially patterned herself vocally after heroes like Reba McEntire, Faith Hill seems to be coming into her own style. “It Matters To Me” is a top-notch second single from Hill's sophomore album. Hill has always found her highest chart positions with uptempo songs, but the strength of her performance on this song may secure success with a ballad as well."

== Music video ==
The song's accompanying music video was directed by photographer Randee St. Nicholas.

== Charts ==
=== Weekly charts ===
Chart (1995–1996)	Peak position
Canada Country Singles (RPM)	2
US Billboard Hot 100	74
US Hot Country Songs (Billboard)	1
US Top Country Singles Sales (Billboard)	1

=== Year-end charts ===
Chart (1996)	Position
Canada Country Tracks (RPM)	53
US Hot Country Songs (Billboard)	14
