= Faith Hill =

American singer (born 1967)

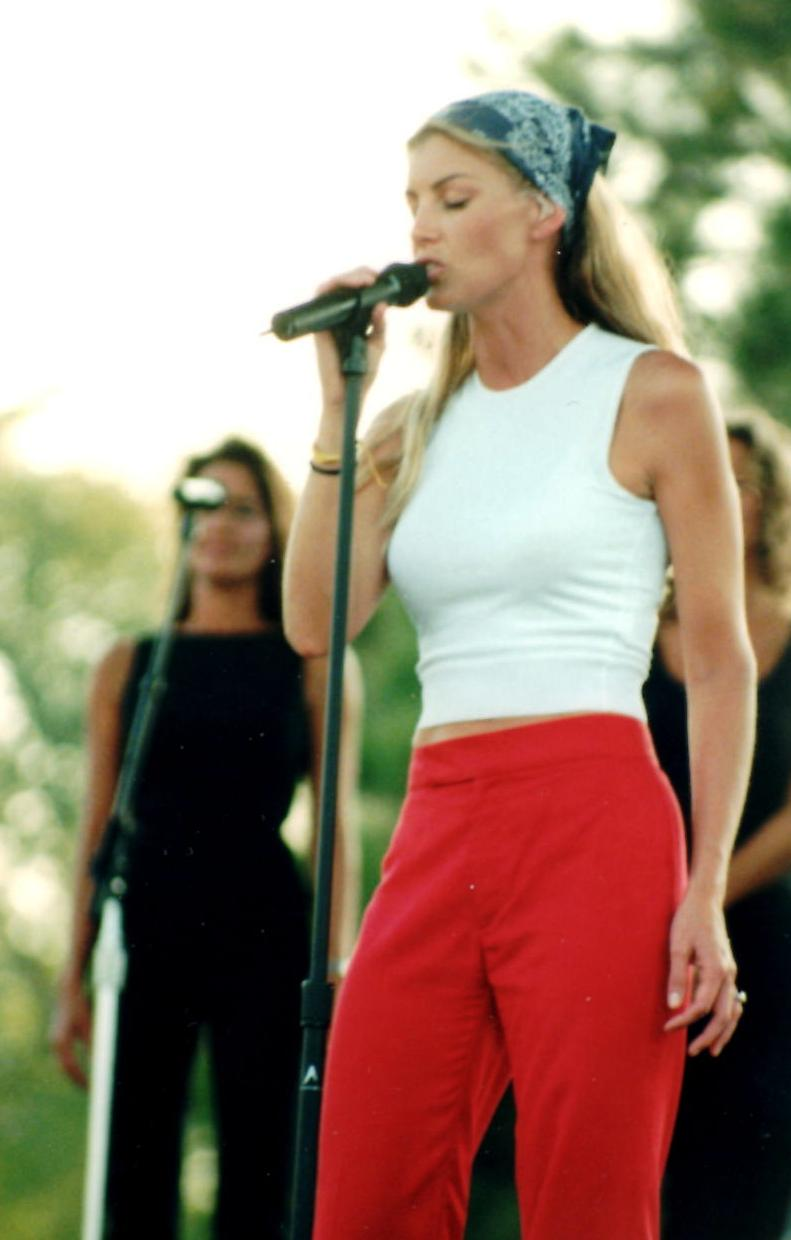
- Hill performing in 2000

Background information
- Born: Audrey Faith Perry; September 21, 1967 (age 59); Ridgeland, Mississippi, U.S.
- Genres: Country; pop
- Occupations: Singer; actress
- Years active: 1993–present
- Labels: Warner Bros. Nashville; Arista Nashville; Columbia Nashville
- Spouses: Daniel Hill (m. 1988; div. 1994) Tim McGraw (m. 1996)
- Website: faithhill.com

Audrey Faith McGraw (née Perry; born September 21, 1967), known professionally as Faith Hill, is an American country singer and actress. She is one of the most successful country music artists of all time, having sold almost 50 million albums worldwide.

Hill's first two albums, Take Me as I Am (1993) and It Matters to Me (1995), were major successes that placed a combined three number ones on Billboard's country charts, quickly establishing her as one of country music's top acts. Next she achieved immense mainstream and crossover success with two albums, Faith (1998) and Breathe (1999). Faith produced her first international hit, "This Kiss", while her album Breathe became one of the best-selling country albums of all time. The album was led by the huge crossover success of the songs "Breathe" and "The Way You Love Me". Breathe saw massive sales worldwide and earned three Grammy Awards.

In 2001, Hill recorded "There You'll Be" for the Pearl Harbor soundtrack and it too became an international success. The track remains her best-selling single in Europe. Hill's next two albums, Cry (2002) and Fireflies (2005), continued her commercial successes; the former spawned another crossover single, "Cry", which won Hill a Grammy, and the latter produced the singles "Mississippi Girl" and "Like We Never Loved at All", which earned additional Grammy Awards.

Hill has won five Grammy Awards, 15 Academy of Country Music Awards, six American Music Awards, and several other awards. Her Soul2Soul II Tour 2006 with Tim McGraw became the highest-grossing country tour of all time. In 2001, she was named one of the "30 Most Powerful Women in America" by Ladies Home Journal. In 2009, Billboard named her as the Adult Contemporary Artist of the Decade (2000s) and also as the 39th top artist overall. From 2007 to 2012, Hill was the voice of NBC Sunday Night Football's intro song. Hill has been married to American singer Tim McGraw since 1996, with whom she has recorded several duets.

== Early life and career beginnings ==
Audrey Faith Perry was born September 21, 1967, in Ridgeland, Mississippi, north of Jackson, Mississippi. She was adopted as an infant and raised in the nearby town of Star, 20 miles southeast of Jackson by her adoptive parents, Edna and Ted Perry, with their two biological sons in a devout Christian environment.

She began singing at Star Baptist Church at age 3. Hill's vocal talent was apparent early, and she had her first public performance, at a 4-H luncheon, when she was seven. In 1976, a few days before her 9th birthday, she attended a concert by Elvis Presley at the State Fair Coliseum in Jackson, which deeply impressed her. During her teenage years, she became a member of the Steele Family gospel quartet and performed regularly with them at area churches of all denominations. At 17, Hill formed a band that played at local rodeos. She graduated from McLaurin Attendance Center in 1986, then briefly attended Hinds Junior College (now Hinds Community College) in Raymond, Mississippi. At times, she sang for prisoners at the Hinds County Jail, her song of choice being "Amazing Grace".

At age 19 Hill dropped out of college to move to Nashville and pursue her dream of being a country singer. In her early days in Nashville, she auditioned to be a backup singer for Reba McEntire, but failed to secure the job. A few years later in 1991, the singer who beat out Hill for the job was killed in a plane crash with 6 other members of Reba's band.

After a stint selling T-shirts, Hill became a secretary at a music publishing firm. Hill also landed a job at a local McDonald's restaurant franchise, which she intensely disliked. "Fries, burgers, cash register–I did it all, I hated it," she has said.

In 1988, she married music publishing executive Daniel Hill (not to be confused with Canadian musician Dan Hill).

A co-worker heard Hill singing to herself one day, and soon the head of her music publishing company was encouraging her to become a demo singer for the firm. She supplemented this work by singing backup vocals for songwriter Gary Burr, who often performed his new songs at Nashville's Bluebird Cafe. During one of those performances, Martha Sharp, an executive from Warner Bros. Records was in the audience, and, impressed with Hill's voice, began the process of signing her to a recording contract.

In 1994, she and Daniel Hill divorced shortly after the release of her album.

== Music career ==
=== 1993–1997: Country music success ===
Faith Hill's debut album was Take Me as I Am (1993); sales were strong, buoyed by the chart success of "Wild One". Hill became the first female country singer in 30 years to hold Billboard's number one position for four consecutive weeks when "Wild One" managed the feat in 1994. Her version of "Piece of My Heart", also went to the top of the country charts in 1994. The album sold a total of 3 million copies. Other singles from the album include "Take Me as I Am".

The recording of Hill's second album was delayed by surgery to repair a ruptured blood vessel on her vocal cords. It Matters to Me finally appeared in 1995 and was another success, with the title track becoming her third number-one country single. Several other top 10 singles followed, and more than 3 million copies of the album were sold. The fifth single from the album, "I Can't Do That Anymore", was written by Alan Jackson. Other singles from the album include "You Can't Lose Me", "Someone Else's Dream", and "Let's Go to Vegas". During this period, Hill appeared on the acclaimed PBS music program Austin City Limits.

In spring 1996, Hill began the Spontaneous Combustion Tour with country singer Tim McGraw. At the time Hill had recently become engaged to her former producer, Scott Hendricks, and McGraw had recently broken an engagement. McGraw and Hill were quickly attracted to each other and began a relationship. After discovering that Hill was pregnant with their first child, the couple married on October 6, 1996. The couple have three daughters together: Gracie Katherine (born May 5, 1997), Maggie Elizabeth (born August 12, 1998) and Audrey Caroline (born December 6, 2001). Since their marriage, Hill and McGraw have endeavored to never be apart for more than three consecutive days.

After the release of It Matters to Me, Hill took a three-year break from recording to give herself a rest from four years of touring and to begin a family with McGraw. During her break, she joined forces with her husband for their first duet, "It's Your Love". The song stayed at number one for six weeks, and won awards from both the Academy of Country Music and the Country Music Association. Hill has remarked that sometimes when they perform the song together, "it [doesn't] feel like anybody else was really watching."

=== 1998–2003: Pop music crossover and career breakthrough ===
Faith Hill re-entered the music business in 1998 with her third album Faith. The album showcased her progression toward a more mainstream, pop-oriented sound, although it retained a distinct country sound. "This Kiss" became a number one country hit, and was the first of her singles to place on the pop charts, peaking at number seven. More than six million copies of the album were sold. The album also had several other hits including another duet with McGraw, "Just To Hear You Say That You Love Me", "Let Me Let Go" and "The Secret of Life".

Hill immediately released Breathe in November 1999 following this success; it debuted at the top of the Billboard Country and all genre charts, ahead of albums by Mariah Carey and Savage Garden. Although the album had few overt country sounds, it "complement[ed] her vocal strengths". For the first time, the album consisted solely of songs about love and did not venture into the more somber territory that her previous albums had touched. The title track, "Breathe", reached number two on the Billboard Hot 100 chart. "The Way You Love Me" hit the top 10 as well, topping out at number six on the charts. The album won Hill three Grammy Awards including Best Country Album, Best Country Collaboration With Vocals for "Let's Make Love" featuring Tim McGraw and Best Country Female Vocal Performance for "Breathe". It marked a step away from her girl-next-door image, as the videos and promotional pictures all portrayed a much sexier image. Breathe has sold almost 10 million copies worldwide.

2000 was a very busy year for Hill. In addition to a successful tour with her husband, Hill was featured in a CBS television special, VH1's Behind the Music, VH1 Divas 2000, and the Lifetime cable channel's Intimate Portrait series. She signed an endorsement deal with CoverGirl makeup, performed at the Academy Awards and the Grammy Awards, appeared on the cover of numerous magazines, and performed the national anthem at Super Bowl XXXIV. Hill was also named to Mr. Blackwell's 10-best dressed women of 2000, the only singer listed among actresses and other celebrities. Hill and McGraw also embarked on their first Soul2Soul tour, the "Soul2Soul Tour 2000".

In 2000, Hill recorded a song for the movie Dr. Seuss' How the Grinch Stole Christmas, entitled "Where Are You Christmas?" (written by James Horner, Will Jennings and Mariah Carey). The song also appeared on the pop and country charts. Hill's success on the pop charts disturbed some country music insiders, who questioned whether she was trying to dismiss her country roots and move into the pop genre. Despite the grumbling, Hill won the CMA Female Vocalist of the Year Award, and in her acceptance speech announced, "I love this business, and I love this industry... and my heart is here."

In 2001, Hill recorded a song for the Pearl Harbor soundtrack. The track, also titled "There You'll Be", which was originally offered to Celine Dion, has since become one of Hill's most critically acclaimed songs. Because of the single's international success, a compilation album There You'll Be: The Best of Faith Hill, was released to international markets. The album featured dance mixes of "Breathe" and "The Way You Love Me" along with alternate versions of "Piece of My Heart" and "Let Me Let Go". "There You'll Be" was nominated for a 2002 Grammy Award for Best Female Pop Vocal Performance.

In 2002, Hill released her fifth studio album, Cry. The album "spotlight[ed] her impressive set of pipes", and also marked the completion of her "transformation into a pop diva", containing few nods to her country roots. Though the album debuted at number one on Billboard magazine's pop and country album charts, the album's singles received much less country radio airplay than her previous hits, instead aiming to international and adult contemporary markets. The album also won a Grammy Award and over 3.7 million copies have been sold worldwide.

An album track from the album "Baby You Belong", was used as the theme song for the movie Lilo & Stitch. The music video featured clips from the movie as well as performance clips.

"When the Lights Go Down", the official second single from the album was used to promote an NBC television special which detailed the making of Cry and also featured intimate performances of Hill's hits.

=== 2005–2006: Return to country music ===
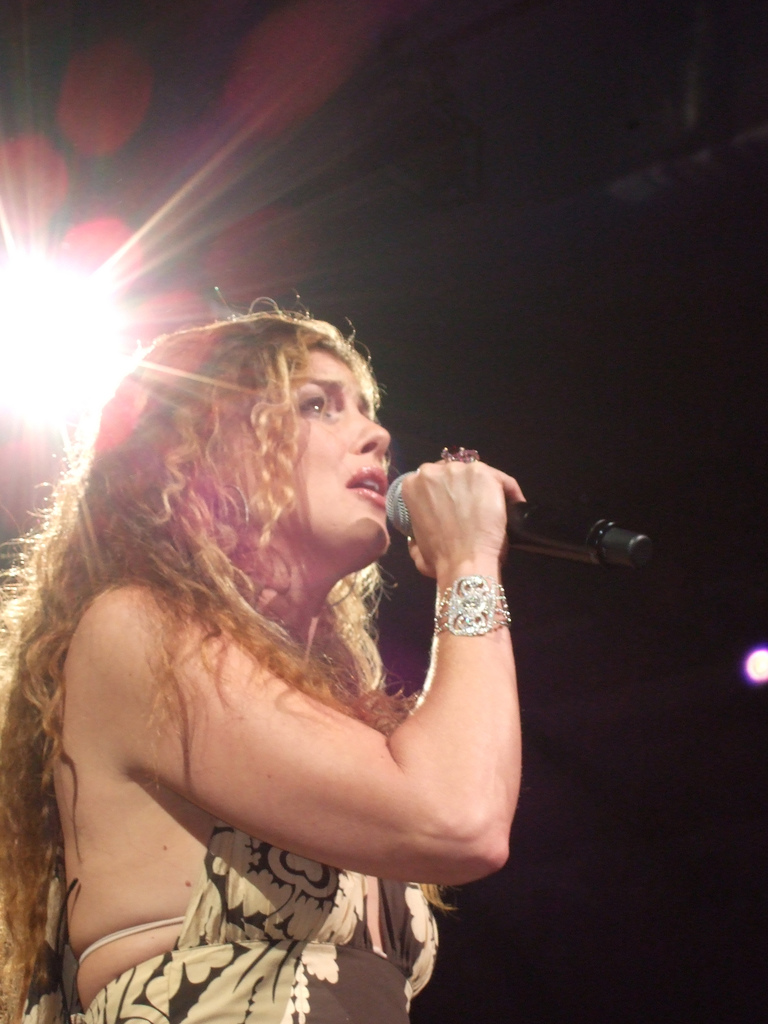
Hill performing in Dallas on the Soul2Soul II Tour, July 29, 2006

In 2005, Hill returned with her new country album, Fireflies. The CD debuted on top of the Billboard Country and all genre album charts, placing her among only a handful of artists to have three consecutive albums debut at number one on both charts. The debut single, "Mississippi Girl", became Hill's highest-debuting single. The song was specifically written for her by John Rich (of Big & Rich) and Adam Shoenfield of MuzikMafia, and tells the abbreviated story of her life. Hill recorded two other songs by Rich, "Sunshine and Summertime" and "Like We Never Loved at All", both of which became successful singles. The title track "Fireflies", "Stealing Kisses" and "If You Ask" were written by artist Lori McKenna and also appear on McKenna's albums. They appeared and performed the songs together on the Oprah Winfrey Show and an awards show. The album marked a return to Hill's country roots and succeeded in reestablishing her place on country radio.

In 2006, after a six-year break from touring following the birth of her youngest daughter, Hill and husband Tim McGraw embarked on their Soul2Soul II Tour 2006. The tour became the highest grossing country music tour ever with a gross of $90 million. It was named "Major Tour of the Year" by the prestigious Pollstar, beating out such heavyweights as Madonna and The Rolling Stones.

=== 2007–2010: Love Will Always Win, The Hits, Joy to the World and NBC Sunday Night Football ===
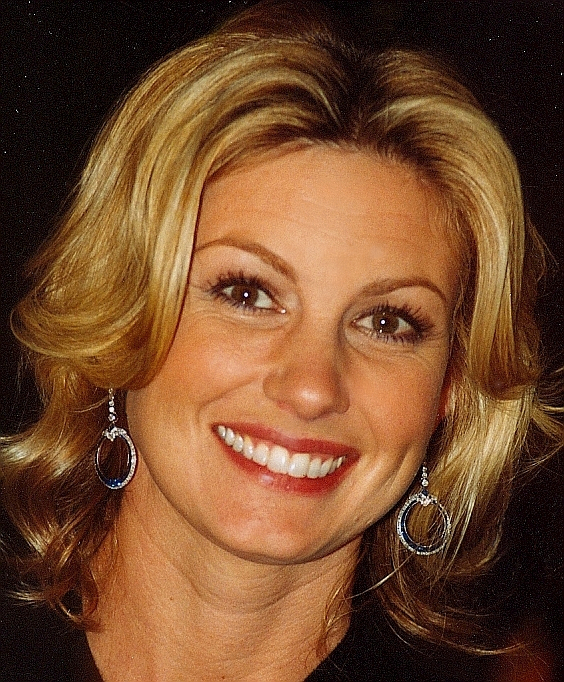
Hill in 2010

In 2007, Hill began work on her first domestic greatest hits package, titled The Hits, which was released on October 2. It contains two new tracks, "Lost" and "Red Umbrella", as well as 13 additional tracks. The album also features hits covering her entire career from 1993 to 2005. Included with the 2-Disc Special-Edition of The Hits is a DVD of 11 of Hill's music videos. The DVD substitutes the Tim McGraw duet "Just To Hear You Say That You Love Me" for their "I Need You" duet on the CD.

Hill is also featured on McGraw's 2007 album Let It Go where she sings two duets with him, "I Need You" and "Shotgun Rider". Both of these songs were performed during the couple's critically acclaimed Soul2Soul II Tour; this tour began in June 2006 and ran through to August 2007. The song I Need You was nominated for both the Best Country Collaboration with Vocals and Best Country Song awards at the 2008 Grammy Awards.

At the beginning of the 2007 NFL season, Hill replaced Pink as the signature voice of NFL on NBC's Sunday Night Football, singing the weekly game's introductory theme song; of which the show's producer said:

It's not often that you get the opportunity to have a mega-star like Faith Hill perform the signature open to your show.

— NBC Sunday Night Football producer Fred Gaudelli, MSNBC

Hill performed this opening theme until April 15, 2013.

In September 2008, Hill issued her first Christmas album, titled Joy to the World. The compilation received positive reviews, including about.com, which gave the album four and a half out of five stars, calling the album "a great collection of classic Christmas songs". She worked on the album for two years prior to its official release. The album included one original track, "A Baby Changes Everything", which was released as the album's only single in late 2008 and debuted at No. 24 on Billboard's AC chart, quickly rising to the No. 1 position, becoming Hill's fourth number one on that chart.

During the Super Bowl XLIII pregame show on February 1, 2009, Hill performed "America the Beautiful". Other performers at the event were Jennifer Hudson and Journey, whilst Bruce Springsteen performed the Halftime show.

Celebrating the induction of ABBA into the Rock and Roll Hall of Fame, Hill performed "The Winner Takes It All", together with keyboardist Benny Andersson, at the event held in New York City on March 13, 2010. Hill also performed a rendition of "The Long & Winding Road" as part of a tribute to Paul McCartney which was held at the White House on July 28, 2010. Audience members included President Barack Obama and First Lady Michelle Obama.

After the performances, Hill contributed a song titled "Give In to Me" which appears on the Country Strong soundtrack which was released in October 2010. The film also stars Hill's husband Tim McGraw. Further appearances followed, with Hill featuring in Coal Miner's Daughter: A Tribute To Loretta Lynn, where she performs "Love Is The Foundation". Hill also contributed her vocals to the Ryan Tedder penned song "All I Ever Wanted" for the 2010 film Life As We Know It. The song was used in trailers to promote the film and appeared during the end credits of the film.

=== 2011–2015: Unreleased studio album and Las Vegas Residency ===
Brendan O'Brien, known for producing projects for Bruce Springsteen, Pearl Jam, and Rage Against the Machine, began working with Hill and producing her next album, originally set for release in 2011. Hill also worked with pop producer Brian Kennedy in January 2011 to complete the album.

Hill returned to the studio in March 2011 for another round of recording. "I would like to have a record out," she told Billboard.com, "but it hasn't been the right thing yet. I don't want it to be just another record. It's a lot of work to support a record, so I just want it to be... really great. I want it to represent where I am as a woman. I don't want it to be fake. I want it to be authentic and real." In mid-2011, Hill recorded a duet with George Strait on the song "A Showman's Life" which is on Strait's album Here for a Good Time.

During the CMA Awards held on November 9, 2011, Hill performed the potential first single for her upcoming album titled "Come Home". This song is a re-working of the OneRepublic song heard on their "Dreaming Out Loud" album.

In June 2012, Hill debuted the songs "Illusion" and "Overrated" during her set at the CMA Music Festival. Following the performance, Hill confirmed that the album was done, but made no comment about when it would be released or whether the rumored title of Illusion was official.

While a second single, titled "American Heart", along with its accompanying music video, was released on October 1, 2012, no further singles have since been released while an album also remains unreleased.

Following a successful tour of Australia with their Soul2Soul tour throughout March and April 2012, Hill and McGraw began an exclusive twenty show run of the Soul2Soul show at the Venetian in Las Vegas starting December 2012. A second leg of the show ran from October 2013, through to April 2014. The show was met with critical acclaim.

During the Billboard Music Awards filmed on May 17, 2015, Hill joined Little Big Town on a performance of their single "Girl Crush".

=== 2016–present: New music and touring ===
Hill was one of 30 artists selected to perform on "Forever Country", a mash-up track of the songs "Take Me Home, Country Roads", "On the Road Again" and "I Will Always Love You". The single was released September 16 and celebrates 50 years of the CMA Awards.

On October 4, 2016, during a surprise show at Nashville's famous Ryman Auditorium, both Faith and her husband announced that they would once again be going back on the road together with the Soul2Soul The World Tour 2017. The tour began April 7, 2017, in New Orleans, and continued into Europe throughout 2018, including as part of the C2C: Country to Country festival.

Hill sent out a tweet via her official Twitter account announcing the release of a new compilation album after the announcement of the tour. The album, titled Deep Tracks, is a montage of Hill's favorite songs that were previously included on her various albums but were not released as singles. The album also includes three previously unreleased songs entitled, "Boy", "Why" and "Come to Jesus". The album, which is Hill's last record to be released via Warner Bros. Records, was released November 18, 2016.

It was reported on February 3, 2017, that Hill, alongside McGraw, had signed a new deal with Sony Music Nashville, also indicating that a duet album between the couple, as well as multiple solo recordings would be produced. The new record label signing also preceded the release of "Speak to a Girl", the lead single from Hill and McGraw's joint album, The Rest of Our Life, which was released on November 17, 2017. The release of the album coincided with the opening of an exhibit at the Country Music Hall of Fame and Museum titled Mississippi Woman, Louisiana Man, which celebrates the careers of both Hill and McGraw.

On May 20, 2020, Hill, alongside her husband Tim McGraw, appeared on CMT's Virtual Benefit Concert, which benefited front line workers during the COVID-19 pandemic. The duo performed the song "Feels So Right".

== Artistry ==
Hill has a mezzo-soprano vocal range, which Joanna Horowitz of The Seattle Times described as unmistakably "throaty".

Although Hill typically does not write most of the music she performs, Horowitz noted that her music "emphasize[s] personal, intimate storytelling". She co-wrote two tracks on her debut album Take Me as I Am: "I've Got This Friend" and "Go the Distance".

== Other ventures ==
=== Film and television career ===
In 1997, Hill guest starred in a three episode arc of popular television series Touched by an Angel and its subsequent spin off series, Promised Land. This marked her acting debut.

In 2002 it was rumored that Hill had won the role of Julia Compton Moore, the wife of Hal Moore, played by Mel Gibson, in the 2002 movie We Were Soldiers. The role was ultimately played by Madeleine Stowe.

Hill made her film debut in the summer of 2004, when she co-starred with Nicole Kidman, Matthew Broderick, Bette Midler and Glenn Close in director Frank Oz's remake of the 1975 thriller The Stepford Wives. Although the film received mixed reviews, it went on to earn over $100 million.

In 2015, Hill appeared in the independent crime drama film Dixieland. The film was written and directed by Hank Bedford and also stars Chris Zylka, Riley Keough, Spencer Lofranco, and Steve Earle. Dixieland had its world premiere at the Tribeca Film Festival on April 19, 2015. The film was released in a limited release and through video on demand on December 11, 2015, by IFC Films.

On October 14, 2015, it was announced that Hill would be an executive producer for a new lifestyle television program with former Oprah executive producer Lisa Erspamer. The show, called Pickler & Ben, debuted in mid-2017, features Kellie Pickler and Ben Aaron as hosts and is filmed in Nashville.

In August 2021, it was announced that Hill would co-star in Paramount+'s Yellowstone prequel 1883. Hill also appeared in one episode of Yellowstone season four in a flashback scene.

List of film and television appearances
| Year | Title | Role | Notes |
|---|---|---|---|
| 1997 | Touched by an Angel | Karen Lamar | Television Debut; Episode: "The Road Home (Part 1)" |
| 1997 | Promised Land | Karen Lamar | Episode: "The Road Home (Part 2)" |
| 1999 | VH1 Divas Live 2 | Herself (performer) | Television Special |
| 2000 | Super Bowl XXXIV | Herself (performer) | "National Anthem" |
| 2000 | 72nd Academy Awards | Herself (performer) | "Over the Rainbow" from The Wizard of Oz |
| 2000 | VH1 Divas 2000: A Tribute to Diana Ross | Herself (performer) | Television Special |
| 2001 | America: A Tribute to Heroes | Herself (performer) | Television Special |
| 2002 | 74th Academy Awards | Herself (performer) | Television Special |
| 2002 | Saturday Night Live | Herself (performer) | Episode: "Sarah Michelle Gellar/Faith Hill" |
| 2002 | Faith Hill: When the Lights Go Down | Herself (performer) | Television Special |
| 2004 | The Stepford Wives | Sarah Sunderson | Film Debut; remake of the 1975 film |
| 2005 | E! True Hollywood Story | Herself | Episode: "Country Divas" |
| 2005 | Faith Hill: Fireflies | Herself (performer) | Television Special |
| 2008 | Macy's Thanksgiving Day Parade | Herself (performer) | Television Special |
| 2008 | Christmas in Rockefeller Center | Herself (performer) | Television Special |
| 2008 | Faith Hill: Joy to the World | Herself (performer) | Television Special |
| 2009 | The Neighborhood Ball: An Inauguration Celebration | Herself (performer) | Television Special |
| 2009 | Super Bowl XLIII | Herself (performer) | "America the Beautiful" |
| 2010 | Project Runway | Herself (guest judge) | Episode: "Finale (Part 2)" |
| 2007–2012 | NBC Sunday Night Football | Herself (performer) | Season theme song performer |
| 2011 | CMT Crossroads | Herself (performer) | Episode: "The Pretenders/Faith Hill" |
| 2012 | Tony Bennett: Duets II | Herself (performer) | Television Special |
| 2015 | Dixieland | Arletta | Feature Film |
| 2016 | The Voice | Herself (Coach advisor) | 4 episodes |
| 2017–2019 | Pickler & Ben | Herself (guest) | Executive Producer (59 episodes); Guest (Episode: "1.1") |
| 2019 | The World's Best | Herself (judge) | 10 episodes |
| 2021 | Yellowstone | Margaret Dutton | Guest star (Episode: "No Kindness for the Coward") |
| 2021–2022 | 1883 | Margaret Dutton | 10 episodes |

=== Fragrance ===
In October 2009, Hill released her first fragrance titled Faith Hill Parfums. The fragrance is a blend of Southern Magnolia, Jasmine and Peach Pears. In 2010, Hill released her second fragrance, titled True.

=== Philanthropy ===
Hill used her 1999 tour to support a national children's book drive, The Faith Hill Family Literacy Project. The charity was inspired by Faith's father, who faced challenges with literacy. Fans who donated books at one of her concerts were entered into a drawing to meet her personally after the show. The effort resulted in the donation of 35,000 children's books, which were distributed to hospitals, schools, libraries, and daycare centers in 40 cities across the United States.

In the days immediately following Hurricane Katrina, Hill and her husband, Tim McGraw, who was raised in Louisiana, joined groups taking supplies to Gulfport, Mississippi. The two also hosted several charity concerts to benefit those who were displaced by the storm. Later in the year the couple established the Neighbor's Keeper Foundation, which provides funding for community charities to assist with basic humanitarian services in the event of a natural disaster or for desperate personal circumstances. In a special gesture, the couple also donated profits from their performance in New Orleans to Hurricane Katrina relief.

In June 2010, Hill and McGraw organized Nashville Rising, a benefit concert aimed to raise $2 million for The Community Foundation of Middle Tennessee in response to the flood in early May that killed 22 people and caused $2 billion in damage.

== Discography ==
Studio albums

- Take Me as I Am (1993)
- It Matters to Me (1995)
- Faith (1998)
- Breathe (1999)
- Cry (2002)
- Fireflies (2005)
- Joy to the World (2008)
- The Rest of Our Life (with Tim McGraw) (2017)

== Tours ==
Headlining tours

- This Kiss Tour (1999)

Co-headlining tours

- Soul2Soul Tour (with Tim McGraw) (2000)
- Soul2Soul II Tour (with Tim McGraw) (2006–07)
- Australia 2012 (with Tim McGraw) (2012)
- Soul2Soul: The World Tour (with Tim McGraw) (2017–18)

Promotional tours

- '94 Promo Tour (1994)

Residency shows

- Faith (2004)
- Soul2Soul (with Tim McGraw) (2012–13)

Opening act

- No Doubt About It Tour (for Neal McCoy) (1994)
- Waitin' on Sundown (for Brooks & Dunn) (1994)
- Read My Mind Tour (for Reba McEntire) (1994)
- Fruit of the Loom Comfort Tour (for Alan Jackson) (1994–95)
- Easy Come Easy Go Tour (George Strait) (1994)
- Spontaneous Combustion Tour (for Tim McGraw) (1996)
- The Cowboy Rides Away Tour (for George Strait) (2014)

Other shows

- Chevy Truck Country Music Festival (with George Strait, Tim McGraw, John Michael Montgomery, Lila McCann and Big House) (1998)
- Millennium Blast Show (with Tim McGraw) (1999)
- Sam & Audrey (with Tim McGraw) (2016)
- Live 8 Rome, Italy (with Tim McGraw, Duran Duran, Planet Funk, Max Pezzali, Fiorella Mannoia, etc.) (2005)

Concert specials

- Faith! (CBS) (2000)
- When the Lights Go Down (NBC) (2002)
- Fireflies (NBC) (2005)
- Love Will Always Win (CBS) (2007)
- Joy to the World (PBS) (2008)
- Greatest Hits (PBS/GAC) (2009)
- Tim & Faith: Soul2Soul (Showtime) (2017)

== Awards ==
=== Grammy Awards ===
The Grammy Awards are awarded annually by the National Academy of Recording Arts and Sciences. Hill has won 5 awards from 17 nominations.

| Year | Nominee / work | Award | Result |
|---|---|---|---|
| 1997 | "Hope" (Country Music's Quest for a Cure) | Best Country Collaboration with Vocals | Nominated |
| 1998 | "It's Your Love" (with Tim McGraw) | Best Country Collaboration with Vocals | Nominated |
| 1999 | "Just to Hear You Say That You Love Me" (feat. Tim McGraw) | Best Country Collaboration with Vocals | Nominated |
| 1999 | Faith | Best Country Album | Nominated |
| 1999 | "This Kiss" | Best Female Country Vocal Performance | Nominated |
| 2000 | "Let Me Let Go" | Best Female Country Vocal Performance | Nominated |
| 2001 | "Breathe" | Best Female Country Vocal Performance | Won |
| 2001 | "Let's Make Love" (feat. Tim McGraw) | Best Country Collaboration with Vocals | Won |
| 2001 | Breathe | Best Country Album | Won |
| 2002 | "There You'll Be" | Best Female Pop Vocal Performance | Nominated |
| 2003 | "Cry" | Best Female Country Vocal Performance | Won |
| 2004 | Cry | Best Country Album | Nominated |
| 2006 | Fireflies | Best Country Album | Nominated |
| 2006 | "Mississippi Girl" | Best Female Country Vocal Performance | Nominated |
| 2006 | "Like We Never Loved at All" (feat. Tim McGraw) | Best Country Collaboration with Vocals | Won |
| 2008 | "I Need You" (with Tim McGraw) | Best Country Collaboration with Vocals | Nominated |
| 2015 | "Meanwhile Back at Mama's" (with Tim McGraw) | Best Country Duo/Group Performance | Nominated |

=== Country Music Association Awards ===
The Country Music Association Awards are held annually by the Country Music Association and celebrate excellence and achievements in the country genre. Hill has won 3 awards from 22 nominations.

| Year | Nominee / work | Award | Result |
|---|---|---|---|
| 1994 | Faith Hill | Horizon Award | Nominated |
| 1995 | Faith Hill | Horizon Award | Nominated |
| 1996 | Faith Hill | Female Vocalist of the Year | Nominated |
| 1997 | "It's Your Love" (with Tim McGraw) | Vocal Event of the Year | Won |
| 1998 | Faith Hill | Female Vocalist of the Year | Nominated |
| 1998 | "This Kiss" | Single of the Year | Nominated |
| 1998 | "This Kiss" | Video of the Year | Won |
| 1998 | "Just to Hear You Say That You Love Me" | Vocal Event of the Year (with Tim McGraw) | Nominated |
| 1999 | "Just to Hear You Say That You Love Me" | Music Video of the Year | Nominated |
| 1999 | Faith Hill | Female Vocalist of the Year | Nominated |
| 2000 | Faith Hill | Female Vocalist of the Year | Won |
| 2000 | Faith Hill | Entertainer of the Year | Nominated |
| 2000 | Breathe | Album of the Year | Nominated |
| 2000 | "Breathe" | Single of the Year | Nominated |
| 2000 | "Breathe" | Music Video of the Year | Nominated |
| 2000 | "Let's Make Love" (with Tim McGraw) | Vocal Event of the Year | Nominated |
| 2001 | Faith Hill | Female Vocalist of the Year | Nominated |
| 2006 | Faith Hill | Female Vocalist of the Year | Nominated |
| 2006 | "Like We Never Loved at All" (with Tim McGraw) | Musical Event of the Year | Nominated |
| 2014 | "Meanwhile Back at Mama's" (with Tim McGraw) | Musical Event of the Year | Nominated |
| 2014 | "Meanwhile Back at Mama's" (with Tim McGraw) | Single of the Year | Nominated |
| 2017 | "Speak to a Girl" (with Tim McGraw) | Musical Event of the Year | Nominated |

=== Other awards ===
In addition to her five Grammy Awards, Hill has also won 15 Academy of Country Music Awards, six American Music Awards, and four People's Choice Awards among others. In addition, Hill received the Samuel S. Beard Award for Greatest Public Service by an Individual 35 Years or Under in 2000, an award given out annually by Jefferson Awards.

| Year | Award | Category |
|---|---|---|
| 1993 | Academy of Country Music Awards | Top New Female Vocalist |
| 1995 | TNN/Music City News Country Awards | Female Star of Tomorrow |
| 1997 | Academy of Country Music Awards | Top Vocal Event of the Year – "It's Your Love" (w/ Tim McGraw) |
| 1997 | Academy of Country Music Awards | Top Video of the Year – "It's Your Love" (w/ Tim McGraw) |
| 1997 | Academy of Country Music Awards | Top Single of the Year – "It's Your Love" (w/ Tim McGraw) |
| 1997 | Academy of Country Music Awards | Top Song of the Year – "It's Your Love" (w/ Tim McGraw) |
| 1998 | Academy of Country Music Awards | Top Female Vocalist |
| 1998 | Academy of Country Music Awards | Top Single of the Year – "This Kiss" |
| 1998 | Academy of Country Music Awards | Top Single of the Year (Producer) - "This Kiss" |
| 1998 | Academy of Country Music Awards | Top Vocal Event of the Year – "Just to Hear You Say That You Love Me" (w/ Tim McGraw) |
| 1998 | Academy of Country Music Awards | Top Vocal Event of the Year (Producer) – "Just to Hear You Say That You Love Me" (w/ Tim McGraw) |
| 1998 | Academy of Country Music Awards | Top Music Video of the Year – "This Kiss" |
| 1999 | TNN/Music City News Country Awards | Vocal Collaboration of the Year – "Just to Hear You Say That You Love Me" (w/ Tim McGraw) |
| 1999 | TNN/Music City News Country Awards | Song of the Year – "Just to Hear You Say That You Love Me" (w/Tim McGraw) |
| 1999 | TNN/Music City News Country Awards | Video of the Year – "This Kiss" |
| 1999 | TNN/Music City News Country Awards | Single of the Year – "This Kiss" |
| 1999 | TNN/Music City News Country Awards | Female Artist of the Year |
| 1999 | Academy of Country Music Awards | Top Female Vocalist |
| 1999 | Academy of Country Music Awards | Top Music Video of the Year – Breathe |
| 2000 | Academy of Country Music Awards | Top Female Vocalist of the Year |
| 2000 | Country Weekly's TNN Awards | Female Artist of the Year |
| 2001 | American Music Awards | Favorite Pop/Rock Female Artist |
| 2001 | American Music Awards | Favorite Country Female Artist |
| 2001 | American Music Awards | Favorite Country Album – Breathe |
| 2002 | American Music Awards | Favorite Country Female Artist |
| 2003 | CMT Music Awards | Hottest Female Video of the Year – "When The Lights Go Down" |
| 2003 | American Music Awards (November) | Favorite Country Female Artist |
| 2004 | People's Choice Awards | Favorite Female Musical Performer |
| 2006 | American Music Awards | Favorite Country Female Artist |
| 2006 | Academy of Country Music Awards | Career Achievement Award |
| 2006 | MVPA Awards | Best Hair - "Like We Never Loved at All" (nominated) |
| 2019 | Hollywood Walk of Fame | Inducted |
| 2022 | Women's Image Network Awards | Outstanding Actress Made For Television Movie / Limited Series (Nominated) |
| 2023 | Gracie Awards | Actress in a Supporting Role Limited Series |
