= Jo Dee Messina discography =

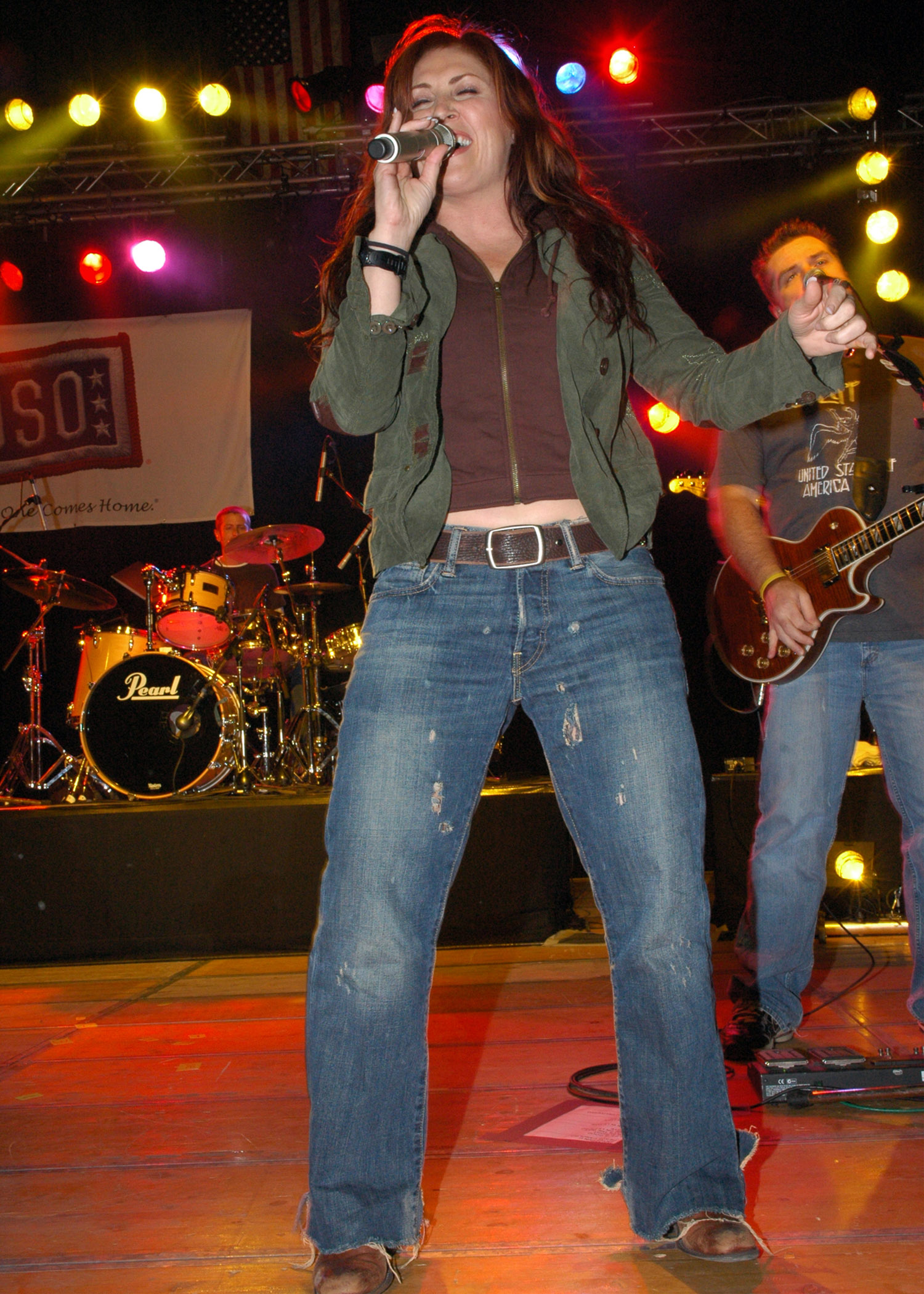
- Jo Dee Messina in concert, 2007.
- Studio albums: 8
- Extended plays: 3
- Compilation albums: 3
- Singles: 37
- Video albums: 1
- Music videos: 13
- Promotional singles: 3
- Other charted songs: 2

American country music artist Jo Dee Messina contains eight studio albums, three compilation albums, three extended plays, and 37 singles. She signed with Curb Records and released her self-titled debut album in 1996. The album spawned two top-ten hits: "Heads Carolina, Tails California" and "You're Not in Kansas Anymore". Messina's second studio album I'm Alright was released in March 1998. The album peaked at number five on the Billboard Top Country Albums chart and number 61 on the Billboard 200 list. The album produced three number one Billboard Hot Country Songs singles: "Bye Bye, "I'm Alright", and "Stand Beside Me". Messina's third studio release Burn was issued in August 2000. Not only becoming her first number-one album on the country albums chart, it also peaked at number 19 on the Billboard 200. It would later certify platinum from the RIAA. The album's lead single "That's the Way" became her fourth number one single on the Hot Country Songs chart. Burn also spawned "Bring on the Rain" (which included vocals from Tim McGraw) and became Messina's fifth number-one country song.

After the release of a holiday album in 2002 and a greatest hits project in 2003, Messina went on a temporary recording hiatus. In April 2005, she issued her fifth studio album Delicious Surprise, which certified gold from the RIAA and debuted at number one on the Billboard country albums chart. The album's lead single "My Give a Damn's Busted" became her sixth number one single on the Billboard country songs chart. Messina then issued a series of minor hit singles and was anticipating the release of a new album entitled Unmistakable. The album went unreleased and was replaced with a series of extended plays in 2010. Leaving Curb Records, she established a Kickstarter campaign to fund her sixth studio album. Me was released in March 2014 and debuted at number 19 on the Top Country Albums chart.

== Albums ==
=== Studio albums ===
List of albums, with selected chart positions and certifications, showing year released and album name
| Title | Album details | Peak chart positions | | | | | Certifications |
| Title | Album details | US | US Cou. | US Ind. | CAN | CAN Cou. | Certifications |
|---|---|---|---|---|---|---|---|
| Jo Dee Messina | Released: March 26, 1996; Label: Curb; Formats: Cassette, CD | 146 | 22 | — | — | 8 | RIAA: Gold |
| I'm Alright | Released: March 17, 1998; Label: Curb; Formats: Cassette, CD | 61 | 5 | — | 96 | 5 | MC: Platinum; RIAA: 2× Platinum |
| Burn | Released: August 1, 2000; Label: Curb; Formats: Cassette, CD | 19 | 1 | — | — | 1 | MC: Gold; RIAA: Platinum |
| A Joyful Noise (Note: A Joyful Noise peaked at number 17 on Top Holiday Albums.) | Released: October 29, 2002; Label: Curb; Formats: CD | 147 | 18 | — | — | — | |
| Delicious Surprise | Released: April 26, 2005; Label: Curb; Formats: CD, music download | 7 | 1 | — | — | — | RIAA: Gold |
| Me | Released: March 18, 2014; Label: Dreambound; Formats: CD, music download | 156 | 19 | 31 | — | — | |
| Bridges | Released: June 5, 2026; Label: Dreambound; Formats: CD, LP, music download | — | — | — | — | — | |
"—" denotes a recording that did not chart or was not released in that territory.

=== Compilation albums ===
List of albums, with selected chart positions and certifications, showing year released and album name
| Title | Album details | Peak chart positions | | Certifications |
| Title | Album details | US | US Cou. | Certifications |
|---|---|---|---|---|
| Greatest Hits | Released: May 20, 2003; Label: Curb; Formats: CD | 14 | 1 | RIAA: Gold |
| All-Time Greatest Hits | Released: July 28, 2017; Label: Curb; Formats: CD | — | — | |
| Heads Carolina, Tails California: The Best of Jo Dee Messina | Released: March 10, 2023; Label: Curb; Formats: LP, CD | — | — | |
"—" denotes a recording that did not chart or was not released in that territory.

== Extended plays ==
List of albums, with selected chart positions, showing year released and album name
| Title | Album details | Peak chart positions | |
| Title | Album details | US | US Cou. |
|---|---|---|---|
| Unmistakable: Love | Released: April 27, 2010; Label: Curb; Formats: CD, music download | 106 | 21 |
| Unmistakable: Drive | Released: November 9, 2010; Label: Curb; Formats: Music download | — | — |
| Unmistakable: Inspiration | Released: November 9, 2010; Label: Curb; Formats: Music download | — | — |
"—" denotes a recording that did not chart or was not released in that territory.

== Singles ==
=== As lead artist ===
List of singles, with selected chart positions and certifications, showing year released and album name
| Title | Year | Peak chart positions | | | | Certifications | Album |
| Title | Year | US | US Cou. | US AC | CAN Cou. | Certifications | Album |
|---|---|---|---|---|---|---|---|
| "Heads Carolina, Tails California" | 1996 | — (Note: "Heads Carolina, Tails California" did not enter the Hot 100, but peaked at number 11 on Bubbling Under Hot 100 Singles, which acts as a 25-song extension of the Hot 100.) | 2 | — | 3 | RIAA: Platinum | Jo Dee Messina |
| "You're Not in Kansas Anymore" | 1996 | — | 7 | — | 22 | | Jo Dee Messina |
| "Do You Wanna Make Something of It" | 1996 | — | 53 | — | 29 | | Jo Dee Messina |
| "He'd Never Seen Julie Cry" | 1997 | — | 64 | — | — | | Jo Dee Messina |
| "Bye Bye" | 1998 | 43 | 1 | — | 1 | RIAA: 2× Platinum | I'm Alright |
| "I'm Alright" | 1998 | 43 | 1 | — | 1 | RIAA: 2× Platinum | I'm Alright |
| "Stand Beside Me" | 1998 | 34 | 1 | — | 1 | | I'm Alright |
| "Lesson in Leavin'" | 1999 | 28 | 2 | — | 2 | RIAA: Gold | I'm Alright |
| "Because You Love Me" | 1999 | 53 | 8 | — | 11 | | I'm Alright |
| "That's the Way" | 2000 | 25 | 1 | — | 1 | | Burn |
| "Burn" | 2000 | 42 | 2 | 17 | 49 | | Burn |
| "Downtime" | 2001 | 46 | 5 | — | — | | Burn |
| "Bring On the Rain" (with Tim McGraw) | 2001 | 36 | 1 | 6 | — | RIAA: Gold | Burn |
| "Dare to Dream" | 2002 | — | 23 | — | — | | Burn |
| "Was That My Life" | 2003 | — (Note: "Was That My Life" did not enter the Hot 100, but peaked at number 14 on Bubbling Under Hot 100 Singles, which acts as a 25-song extension of the Hot 100.) | 21 | — | — | | Greatest Hits |
| "I Wish" | 2003 | 75 | 15 | — | — | | Greatest Hits |
| "My Give a Damn's Busted" | 2005 | 63 | 1 | — | 1 | RIAA: Gold | Delicious Surprise |
| "Delicious Surprise (I Believe It)" | 2005 | — | 23 | — | 24 | | Delicious Surprise |
| "Not Going Down" | 2005 | — | 28 | — | — | | Delicious Surprise |
| "It's Too Late to Worry" | 2006 | — | 33 | — | — | | Delicious Surprise |
| "Biker Chick" | 2007 | — | 48 | — | — | | Unmistakable: Drive |
| "I'm Done" | 2008 | — | 34 | — | — | | Non-album singles |
| "Shine" | 2009 | — | — | — | — | | Non-album singles |
| "That's God" | 2010 | — | — | — | — | | Unmistakable: Inspiration |
| "Carry Me" | 2011 | — | — | — | — | | Non-album singles |
| "Unbreakable" (featuring Alyssa Bonagura) | 2013 | — | — | — | — | | Non-album singles |
| "Peace Sign" | 2013 | — | — (Note: "Peace Sign" did not enter Hot Country Songs, but peaked at number 43 on Billboard Country Indicator.) | — | — | | Me |
| "A Woman's Rant" | 2014 | — | — (Note: "A Woman's Rant" did not enter Hot Country Songs, but peaked at number 38 on Billboard Country Indicator.) | — | — | | Me |
| "He's Messed Up" | 2014 | — | — (Note: "He's Messed Up" did not enter Hot Country Songs, but peaked at number 53 on Billboard Country Indicator.) | — | — | | Me |
| "Will You Love Me" | 2015 | — | — | — | — | | Non-album singles |
| "Noel" | 2015 | — | — | — | — | | Non-album singles |
| "Bigger Than This" | 2018 | — | — | — | — | | Non-album singles |
| "Reckless Love" | 2018 | — | — | — | — | | Non-album singles |
| "She Had Me at Heads Carolina" (Remix) (with Cole Swindell) | 2022 | — | — | — | — | | Non-album singles |
| "Just to Be Loved" | 2023 | — | — | — | — | | Non-album singles |
| "Some Bridges" | 2026 | — | — | — | — | | Bridges |
| "Message in a Bottle" | 2026 | — | — | — | — | | Bridges |
"—" denotes a recording that did not chart or was not released in that territory.

=== Promotional singles ===
List of promotional singles, showing all relevant details
| Title | Year | Album | Ref. |
|---|---|---|---|
| "Closer" | 2001 | Burn | |
| "Don't Let Them Hide Your Beautiful" | 2026 | Bridges | |
| "Can Anybody" | 2026 | Bridges | |

== Other charted songs ==
List of singles, with selected chart positions, showing year released and album name
| Title | Year | Peak chart positions | | Album |
| Title | Year | US Cou. | US AC | Album |
|---|---|---|---|---|
| "No Time for Tears" | 1999 | 75 | — | I'm Alright |
| "A Joyful Noise" | 2002 | — | 16 | A Joyful Noise |
"—" denotes a recording that did not chart or was not released in that territory.

== Videography ==
=== Video albums ===
| Title | Details |
|---|---|
| The Video Collection | Released: February 12, 2002; Label: Curb; Formats: DVD |

=== Music videos ===
List of music videos, showing year released and director
| Title | Year | Director(s) | Ref. |
|---|---|---|---|
| "Heads Carolina, Tails California" | 1996 | Roger Pistole | |
| "Do You Wanna Make Something of It" | 1996 | Chris Rogers | |
| "Bye Bye" | 1998 | Jon Small | |
| "I'm Alright" | 1998 | Jon Small | |
| "Stand Beside Me" | 1998 | Jim Shea | |
| "Because You Love Me" | 1999 | Lawrence Carroll | |
| "That's the Way" | 2000 | Thom Oliphant | |
| "Burn" | 2000 | Thom Oliphant | |
| "Bring on the Rain" | 2001 | Morgan Lawley | |
| "Dare to Dream" | 2002 | Morgan Lawley | |
| "My Give a Damn's Busted" | 2005 | Peter Zavadil | |
| "Delicious Surprise" | 2005 | Peter Zavadil | |
| "It's Too Late to Worry" | 2006 | Peter Zavadil | |
| "Some Bridges" | 2026 | | |
| "Can Anybody" | 2026 | | |
| "Message in a Bottle" | 2026 | | |
