= Greatest Hits (Jo Dee Messina album) =

Greatest hits album by Jo Dee Messina
- Released: May 20, 2003
- Recorded: 1996–2003
- Genre: Country
- Length: 54:01
- Label: Curb
- Producer: various

Jo Dee Messina chronology
A Joyful Noise (2002)	Greatest Hits (2003)	Delicious Surprise (2005)

Singles from Greatest Hits
- 1. "Was That My Life" Released: January 18, 2003; 2. "I Wish" Released: July 26, 2003

Professional ratings
Review scores
Source	Rating
Allmusic	4/5 stars

Greatest Hits is the first greatest hits album by American country singer Jo Dee Messina. It was released on May 20, 2003 by Curb Records in the United States and June 2, 2003 in the United Kingdom.

After a successful period which spawned five country number one hits and two platinum albums, Burn (2000) and I'm Alright (1998), Messina took a break from the music industry and released a Christmas album titled A Joyful Noise (2002). The compilation includes eleven of Messina's country hits. Included on Greatest Hits is four new tracks: "Was That My Life", "I Wish", a cover of the Jessica Andrews song "Wishing Well", and "You Belong in the Sun", with "Was That My Life" and "I Wish" becoming singles, peaking at number 21 and 15 on the Billboard Hot Country Songs chart.

The compilation became a success, becoming her second number one album on the Top Country Albums chart following Burn and was Messina's then highest-charting entry on the Billboard 200, debuting at number 14. The album was later certified Gold by the RIAA for shipments of 500,000 copies. The Enhanced CD version of the album includes the video for "Bring On the Rain".

== Commercial performance ==
Greatest Hits debuted at number one on the Top Country Albums chart for the week of June 6, 2003, debuting with first-week sales of 52,000 copies. The album gave Messina her second number one album on the country charts after Burn (2000). Greatest Hits also became Messina's then highest charting on the Billboard 200, debuting at number 14; her 2005 album Delicious Surprise would later surpass it when it debuted at number seven. The next week, Greatest Hits fell to numbers two and 35 on the country albums and Billboard 200; in total, the album would spend 83 weeks on Top Country Albums and 20 weeks on the Billboard 200.

== Track listing ==
No.	Title	Writer(s)	Original album	Length
1.	"Was That My Life"	Bill Luther, Marv Green	New song	3:50
2.	"I'm Alright"	Phil Vassar	I'm Alright (1998)	3:16
3.	"Heads Carolina, Tails California"	Tim Nichols, Mark D. Sanders	Jo Dee Messina (1996)	3:28
4.	"Bye Bye"	Vassar, Rory Bourke	I'm Alright	3:20
5.	"Stand Beside Me"	Stephen Allen Davis	I'm Alright	3:42
6.	"Bring On the Rain" (duet with Tim McGraw)	Helen Darling, Billy Montana	Burn (2000)	3:58
7.	"Lesson in Leavin'"	Randy Goodrum, Brent Maher	I'm Alright	3:38
8.	"That's the Way"	Annie Roboff, Holly Lamar	Burn	3:22
9.	"Burn"	Tina Arena, Pam Reswick, Steve Werfel	Burn	4:39
10.	"Downtime"	Phillip Coleman, Carolyn Dawn Johnson	Burn	3:44
11.	"Because You Love Me"	Kostas, John Scott Sherrill	I'm Alright	3:51
12.	"You're Not in Kansas Anymore"	Zack Turner, Nichols	Jo Dee Messina	2:54
13.	"Wishing Well"	Roboff, Vassar	New song, Jessica Andrews cover	3:10
14.	"You Belong in the Sun"	Jim Beavers, Marcia Ramirez	New song	3:36
15.	"I Wish"	Ed Hill, Tommy Lee James	New song	3:33
Total length:				54:01

== Charts ==
=== Weekly charts ===
Chart (2003)	Peak position
US Billboard 200	14
US Top Country Albums (Billboard)	1

=== Year-end charts ===
Chart (2003)	Position
US Top Country Albums (Billboard)	31
Chart (2004)	Position
US Top Country Albums (Billboard)	62

== Certifications ==
Region	Certification	Certified units/sales
United States (RIAA)	Gold	500,000^{^}
^{^} Shipments figures based on certification alone.
