= View from the Top =

2003 film by Bruno Barreto

- Theatrical release poster
- Directed by: Bruno Barreto
- Written by: Eric Wald
- Produced by: Brad Grey; Matthew Baer; Bobby Cohen
- Starring: Gwyneth Paltrow; Christina Applegate; Mark Ruffalo; Candice Bergen; Joshua Malina; Kelly Preston; Rob Lowe; Mike Myers
- Cinematography: Affonso Beato
- Edited by: Christopher Greenbury; Ray Hubley; Charles Ireland
- Music by: Theodore Shapiro
- Production company: Brad Grey Pictures
- Distributed by: Miramax (United States); Moonstone Entertainment (International)
- Release date: March 21, 2003
- Running time: 87 minutes
- Country: United States
- Language: English
- Budget: $30 million
- Box office: $19.5 million

View from the Top is a 2003 American comedy film directed by Bruno Barreto and starring Gwyneth Paltrow, Christina Applegate, Mark Ruffalo, Candice Bergen, Joshua Malina, Rob Lowe, Mike Myers, and Kelly Preston.

The plot follows the young Donna Jensen, a small town girl, who sets out to fulfill her dream of seeing the world by becoming a flight attendant.

Completed in 2001, View from the Top was originally scheduled for theatrical release in December of that year, but was delayed in the aftermath of the September 11 attacks and underwent significant editing. Eventually released on March 21, 2003, the film was panned by critics, and was a box-office bomb, grossing $19.5 million against its $30 million budget.

== Plot ==
Donna Jensen, living in a Silver Springs, Nevada trailer with her alcoholic mother and abusive stepfather, desperately wants to get away. After graduating high school, Donna struggles to earn a living working as a clerk in a Big Lots store with her high school boyfriend, Tommy.

After Tommy leaves her, Donna is inspired by a TV interview with Sally Weston, a former flight attendant who wrote a memoir titled, My Life in the Sky. Donna becomes a flight attendant for Sierra Airlines, a small, seedy regional airline. She works with senior attendant Sherry and Christine Montgomery.

During this time, Donna meets law school drop-out Ted Stewart. She wants to apply to Royalty Airlines and convinces Sherry and Christine to join her at the company's job fair in San Francisco. While Christine and Donna are hired, Sherry is not, so she remains with Sierra.

Training under eccentric teacher John Whitney, Donna studies hard, and, after meeting Sally, is determined to be assigned to the airline's esteemed Paris first-class international route. After taking her exit exam, Donna is shocked and disappointed to be assigned to a domestic route based in Cleveland while Christine, who struggled throughout the course, is inexplicably assigned the highly-sought New York City route.

Although unhappy in Cleveland, Donna runs into Ted, who has returned to law school there. They begin a relationship and she spends Christmas with him and his family. A few months later, Donna runs into Christine, whose flight was diverted to Cleveland due to a mechanical issue. Donna is shocked to find Christine has stolen Royalty Air items in her handbag, as even the smallest theft could result in termination.

Donna begins to suspect a processing error occurred on her test. With Sally's help, she discovers that Christine switched their test I.D. numbers during their final exam (Christine's trademark was using little hearts to dot her i's). Weston has airline security spy on her. Caught stealing, Christine is fired.

Donna re-takes the exam, achieving a perfect score. She is assigned to a Paris, first class, international route, though it results in her ending her relationship with Ted. Christine confronts Donna and violently attacks her before being apprehended by airport security.

Though proud to have achieved her goal, Donna soon realizes that she is lonely and unhappy, and misses Ted. With Sally's encouragement, she returns to Cleveland and she and Ted reconcile. The film ends with Donna—now a pilot—wishing her passengers well as they land in Cleveland.

== Cast ==
- Gwyneth Paltrow as Donna Jensen
  - Chelsey Cole as Donna Jensen (age 6)
- Christina Applegate as Christine Montgomery
- Mark Ruffalo as Ted Stewart
- Candice Bergen as Sally Weston
- Joshua Malina as Randy Jones
- Kelly Preston as Sherry
- Rob Lowe as Co-Pilot Steve
- Mike Myers as John Whitney
- Marc Blucas as Tommy Boulay
- Stacey Dash as Angela Samona
- Jon Polito as Roy Roby
- Concetta Tomei as Mrs. Stewart
- Robyn Peterson as Donna's Mom
- Nadia Dajani as Paige
- John Francis Daley as Rodney
- Frederick Coffin as Mr. Stewart
- Connie Sawyer as Grandma Stewart
- Chad Everett as Jack Weston (Note: Uncredited.)
- George Kennedy as Passenger requesting vodka
- Stephen Tobolowsky as Frank Thomas
- Jessica Capshaw as Royal International Flight Attendant

== Production ==
=== Development ===
Screenwriter Eric Wald wrote View from the Top as a spec script while a student at the University of California, Los Angeles. The project was developed with producer Brad Grey before being sold to Miramax for $450,000. Rewrites were performed on the script by Roger Kumble.

=== Casting ===
In September 2000, it was announced Gwyneth Paltrow was in negotiations to star in View from the Top. According to Miramax executive Harvey Weinstein, Paltrow was paid a $10 million salary for her role in the film.

=== Filming ===
Principal photography began in January 2001 in Lake Havasu, Arizona. Additional filming occurred in Nevada and in Irvine and Los Angeles, California.

The film was among the first to feature Coors Brewing Company product placement after Miramax struck a brand deal with the brewery in 2002.

== Soundtrack ==
The original soundtrack for View from the Top was released on March 18, 2003 by Curb Records.

=== Track listing ===
View from the Top: Motion Picture Soundtrack

Soundtrack album by Various
- Released: March 18, 2003
- Label: Curb Records
- Producers: Mike Curb; Michael Lloyd

No.	Title	Writer(s)	Performer(s)	Length
1.	"Suddenly"	Andreas Carlsson; Desmond Child	LeAnn Rimes	4:00
2.	"No Sign of It" (Humberto Gatica radio edit)	Scott Cutler; Anne Preven	Natalie Grant	4:03
3.	"Was That My Life"	Marv Green; Bill Luther	Jo Dee Messina	3:49
4.	"I'm Not Anybody's Girl"	Jason Levine; Jay McCollum	Kaci	3:13
5.	"I've Been Waiting"	Matt Slocum	Sixpence None the Richer	4:18
6.	"Boys Don't Cry"	Tiffany Arbuckle Lee; Matt Bronleewe	Plumb	3:48
7.	"Utopia"	Johan Glössner; Sofia Loell	Sofia Loell	3:42
8.	"Circle of Love"	Del Harley; Allan Koppelberger; Laurie Webb	Tamara Walker	3:41
9.	"The Bus Ride"	Gary Burr; Matt Rollings; Anna Wilson	Anna Wilson	3:54
10.	"Sincerely"	Alan Freed; Harvey Fuqua	G.G.	3:15
11.	"Time After Time"	Rob Hyman; Cyndi Lauper	Katie Cook	4:04
12.	"Everywhere I Look, There's You"	Michael Behymer; Mike Curb; Michael Lloyd	Tamara Walker	3:57

Bonus tracks

No.	Title	Writer(s)	Performer(s)	Length
13.	"Tickle Me"	Danielle Spencer	Danielle Spencer	3:48
14.	"Downtime"	Phillip Coleman; Carolyn Dawn Johnson	Jo Dee Messina	3:43
15.	"Suddenly" (Riva radio edit)	Andreas Carlsson; Desmond Child	LeAnn Rimes	4:08

== Release ==
View from the Top opened on March 21, 2003 (it was originally scheduled for Christmas 2001, but in light of the September 11 attacks and due to the fact that the story revolves around a flight attendant on numerous planes, the release was pushed back). The film was also heavily re-edited between its completion in 2001 and its eventual release.

=== Home media ===
Miramax Home Entertainment released the movie on VHS and DVD on September 9, 2003. It would be later released digitally and onto world-wide TV in 2026 by Moonstone Entertainment, the film's current international sales and distributor. Miramax still handles distribution rights in the United States.

== Reception ==
=== Box office ===
The film grossed $7,009,513 in its opening weekend, ranking number four behind Bringing Down the House, Dreamcatcher, and Agent Cody Banks. The film would eventually gross $15,614,000 domestically and $3,912,014 internationally, totaling $19,526,014 worldwide, below the production budget of $30 million.

=== Critical response ===
On the review aggregator website Rotten Tomatoes, 14% of 118 critics' reviews are positive. The website's consensus reads: "Uneven in tone and badly edited, View from the Top wastes the talents of its cast and condescends to its characters." Metacritic, which uses a weighted average, assigned the film a score of 27 out of 100, based on 30 critics, indicating "generally unfavorable" reviews. Audiences polled by CinemaScore gave the film an average grade of "B−" on an A+ to F scale.

Roger Ebert gave the film a favorable three out of four star-rating, writing: "I anticipated an updated version of Coffee, Tea or Me? but what I got instead was Donna the Flight Attendant. The movie reminded me of career books I read in the seventh grade with titles like Bob Durham, Boy Radio Announcer. It’s a little more sophisticated, of course, but it has the same good heart, and a teenager thinking of a career in the air might really enjoy it." Owen Gleiberman gave the film a middling review, noting: "View From the Top is a romantic comedy with all the confectionary value of one of those watery diet shakes; it practically evaporates while you’re watching it. Taken strictly as a Gwyneth Paltrow fashion show, however, the movie has much to recommend it."

Manohla Dargis of the Los Angeles Times panned the film for its tonal inconsistency, writing: "View From the Top is worth commenting on only for its shocking ineptitude."

Paltrow herself later disparaged the film, calling it "the worst movie ever".

British comedian Richard Ayoade wrote the book Ayoade on Top, an in-depth comic analysis of the film, in 2019. A portion of the promotional blurb for the book reads: "Ayoade argues for the canonisation of this brutal masterpiece, a film that celebrates capitalism in all its victimless glory; one we might imagine Donald Trump himself half-watching on his private jet's gold-plated flat screen while his other puffy eye scans the cabin for fresh, young prey."
