= I'm Done =

I'm Done may refer to:

- I'm Done (film), a 1975 Soviet musical comedy film
- "I'm Done" (song), a 2008 single by Jo Dee Messina
- "I'm Done", a song by Korn from Take a Look in the Mirror
- "I'm Done", a song by the Pussycat Dolls from Doll Domination
