= Unmistakable =

Unmistakable may refer to:

- Unmistakable: Love, EP by Jo Dee Messina
- Unmistakable, an album by Beverley Mahood
- Unmistakable, an album by Jo Dee Messina
