= Set This Circus Down =

Studio album by Tim McGraw
- Released: April 24, 2001
- Studios: Ocean Way Nashville, The Tracking Room, Essential Sound Studios and Final Stage Mastering (Nashville, Tennessee); Sound Kitchen (Franklin, Tennessee); Sony Music Studios (Santa Monica, California); Extasy Recording Studio South (Los Angeles, California)
- Genre: Country pop
- Length: 56:16
- Label: Curb
- Producers: Byron Gallimore; Tim McGraw; James Stroud

Tim McGraw chronology
Greatest Hits (2000)	Set This Circus Down (2001)	Tim McGraw and the Dancehall Doctors (2002)

Singles from Set This Circus Down
- 1. "Grown Men Don't Cry" Released: March 26, 2001; 2. "Angry All the Time" Released: July 23, 2001; 3. "The Cowboy in Me" Released: November 26, 2001; 4. "Unbroken" Released: May 20, 2002

Professional ratings
Review scores
Source	Rating
About.com	(favorable)
Allmusic	4/5 stars
Billboard	(favorable)
Entertainment Weekly	B
Rolling Stone	(favorable)
Sputnikmusic	(2.5/5)

Set This Circus Down is the sixth studio album by American country music artist Tim McGraw. It was released on April 24, 2001, by Curb Records. The album produced four singles, all of which reached No. 1 on the US Billboard Hot Country Songs chart.

== Content ==
The first single from his album is "Grown Men Don't Cry" released in March 2001 and was written by Tom Douglas and Steve Seskin. "Angry All the Time", the second single, was originally recorded by its writer, Bruce Robison, on his 1996 self-titled album. "The Cowboy in Me" is the third single, and it reached Number One one week after McGraw's duet with Jo Dee Messina, "Bring On the Rain". "Unbroken" became the album's final single in May 2002. "Things Change" is a studio recording of a song which McGraw had previously recorded as a live version, which reached #34 on the country charts in 2000 from unsolicited airplay. Another track from this album is "Telluride". Despite reaching #52, it wasn't officially released as a single. It also appears on Josh Gracin's 2008 album We Weren't Crazy, from which it was released as a single in December 2008. "Angel Boy" was made into a music video, which got some airplay on CMT, but was not released as a single either.

== Reception ==
=== Commercial performance ===
The album reached number one on the Top Country Albums chart. However, it was kept off from the top position on the main Billboard 200 by Janet Jackson's All for You, opening at 605,000 copies, while Set This Circus Down debuted at number two at 223,400 units, according to Soundscan. It also broke the Top 20 in Canada and peaked at number 95 in Australia. The album has since been certified triple platinum by the RIAA for shipments of three million copies in the United States, as well as platinum accolade for sales in Canada.

=== Critical response ===
About.com gave a "favorable" review and said it would not "disappoint those used to the excellent song selection of Tim's previous releases." Thom Jurek from Allmusic gave it 4 out of 5 stars and noted that Tim "masterfully and consistently flows from one sound style to the next[, yet] his familiar country-pop sound remains evident throughout, especially on the title track, a song about a fast-paced couple yearning to kick back and relax in the country (no one said the themes would be original)." While Billboard magazine, and Rolling Stone all gave it positive and favorable reviews, David Brown from Entertainment Weekly gave it a B grade and said "From the eclectic songs he and his coproducers have chosen to the simple fact that his face doesn't appear on the cover for the first time, Set This Circus Down presents itself as an Important Statement, McGraw's career defining work[, though] McGraw doesn't write any of his material" when saying that the album "feels conceptual, almost autobiographical." John "weathered old reviewer" Hanson from Sputnikmusic gave it a 2.5 average after saying "Set This Circus Down, in [his] eyes his best album, shows the time where he was at both the least level of cheese, but had not yet 'sold out,' or sold out as much as you can in the Country scene."

== Track listing ==
No.	Title	Writer(s)	Length
1.	"The Cowboy in Me"	Al Anderson, Craig Wiseman, Jeffrey Steele	4:04
2.	"Telluride"	Brett James, Troy Verges	3:49
3.	"You Get Used to Somebody"	Steve Bogard, Tom Shapiro	3:58
4.	"Unbroken"	Annie Roboff, Holly Lamar	4:00
5.	"Things Change"	Chris Lindsey, Bill Luther, Aimee Mayo, Marv Green	3:20
6.	"Angel Boy"	Danny Orton	5:11
7.	"Forget About Us"	Mark Collie	4:09
8.	"Take Me Away from Here"	Jeff Stevens, Steve Bogard	4:35
9.	"Smilin'"	Lindsey, Luther, Mayo, Green	3:00
10.	"Set This Circus Down"	Bill Luther, Josh Kear	3:31
11.	"Angry All the Time"	Bruce Robison	4:30
12.	"Let Me Love You"	Lindsey, Luther, Mayo, Green	4:31
13.	"Grown Men Don't Cry"	Tom Douglas, Steve Seskin	3:55
14.	"Why We Said Goodbye"	Douglas, Billy Kirsch	3:44

== Personnel ==
=== Musicians ===
- Tim McGraw – lead vocals
- Steve Nathan – keyboards (1, 3–14)
- Jeff Babko – keyboards (2)
- Biff Watson – acoustic guitar (1, 3–5, 7–14)
- Larry Byrom – acoustic guitar (6)
- Michael Landau – electric guitar (1, 3–14)
- B. James Lowry – electric guitar (1, 3–14)
- Brent Mason – electric guitar (2)
- Val McCallum – electric guitar (2)
- Byron Gallimore – baritone guitar (7, 11)
- Mike Henderson – baritone guitar solo (11)
- Paul Franklin – steel guitar
- Glenn Worf – bass (1, 3–11, 13, 14)
- Mike Elizondo – bass (2, 12)
- Lonnie Wilson – drums (1, 3–11, 13, 14)
- Peter M. Thomas – drums (2, 12)
- Aubrey Haynie – fiddle
- Rob Mathes – string arrangements and conductor (3, 13, 14)
- Michael Omartian – string arrangements and conductor (8)
- Carl Gorodetzky – string contractor (3, 8, 13, 14)
- The Nashville String Machine – strings (3, 8, 13, 14)
- Gene Miller – backing vocals (1–9, 11–14)
- Chris Rodriguez – backing vocals (1, 3–7, 9, 11–14)
- Curtis Wright – backing vocals (2, 8)
- Curtis Young – backing vocals (8)
- Faith Hill – backing vocals (11)

=== Production ===
- Byron Gallimore – producer
- Tim McGraw – producer, concept, direction
- James Stroud – producer
- Julian King – tracking engineer (1, 3–11, 13, 14), string engineer (8), additional engineer
- John Paterno – tracking engineer (2, 12), additional engineer
- Russ Martin – string engineer (3, 13, 14)
- Ricky Cobble – second tracking engineer (1, 3–5, 7–11, 13, 14), assistant string engineer (8), additional engineer
- Samie Barela – second tracking engineer (2, 12)
- Jed Hackett – second tracking engineer (6), additional engineer
- Greg Fogie – assistant second tracking engineer (1, 3, 4, 7, 9, 14)
- David Bryant – assistant string engineer (3, 13, 14), assistant second tracking engineer (5, 8, 10, 11, 13)
- Clinton Brown – additional engineer
- Dennis Davis – additional engineer
- Randy LeRoy – additional engineer
- Erik Lutkins – additional engineer
- Jonathan Merritt – additional engineer
- Ronnie Rivera – additional engineer
- Mike Shipley – mixing at Record One (Sherman Oaks, California)
- Jeff Burns – mix assistant
- Robert Hadley – mastering
- Doug Sax – mastering
- The Mastering Lab (Hollywood, California) – mastering location
- Ann Callis – production assistant
- Eric Gallimore – song assistant
- Missi Gallimore – song assistant
- Michelle Metzger – song assistant
- Tiffany Swinea – song assistant
- Kelly Clauge Wright – creative director
- Glenn Sweitzer – art direction, design, digital Illustration
- Greg Call – cover Illustration
- Marina Chavez – road photography
- Steven Klein – studio photography

== Charts and certifications ==
=== Weekly charts ===
Chart (2001)	Peak position
Australian Albums (ARIA)	95
Canadian Albums (Billboard)	14
US Billboard 200	2
US Top Country Albums (Billboard)	1

=== Year-end charts ===
Year-end chart performance for Set This Circus Down
Chart (2001)	Position
Canadian Albums (Nielsen SoundScan)	159
Canadian Country Albums (Nielsen SoundScan)	11
US Billboard 200	74
US Top Country Albums (Billboard)	8

Chart (2002)	Position
Canadian Country Albums (Nielsen SoundScan)	21
US Billboard 200	90
US Top Country Albums (Billboard)	11

Chart (2003)	Position
US Top Country Albums (Billboard)	65

=== Singles ===
All singles reached Number One on the Billboard Hot Country Songs chart and all reached top 40 on the Hot 100 chart.

Year	Single	Peak chart positions	
Year	Single	US Country	US
2001	"Grown Men Don't Cry"	1	25
2001	"Angry All the Time"	1	38
2001	"The Cowboy in Me"	1	33
2002	"Unbroken"	1	26
"—" denotes releases that did not chart

=== Certifications ===
Region	Certification	Certified units/sales
Canada (Music Canada)	Platinum	100,000^{^}
United States (RIAA)	3× Platinum	3,000,000^{^}
^{^} Shipments figures based on certification alone.
