= The Cowboy in Me =

Single by Tim McGraw

from the album Set This Circus Down
- Released: November 26, 2001
- Genre: Country
- Length: 4:04
- Label: Curb
- Songwriters: Al Anderson; Craig Wiseman; Jeffrey Steele
- Producers: Byron Gallimore; Tim McGraw; James Stroud

Tim McGraw singles chronology
"Bring On the Rain" (2001)	"The Cowboy in Me" (2001)	"Unbroken" (2002)

"The Cowboy in Me" is a song written by Jeffrey Steele, Al Anderson and Craig Wiseman, and recorded by American country music artist Tim McGraw. It was released in November 2001 as the third single from McGraw's Set This Circus Down album. The song reached number one on the Billboard Hot Country Singles & Tracks (now Hot Country Songs) charts just one week after McGraw's duet with Jo Dee Messina, "Bring On the Rain".

== Critical reception ==
Kevin John Coyne of Country Universe gave the song a B grade, saying that the song "might be an amoebic form of the country lifestyle anthems that have flooded the genre in the years since it was released." He added that it is "certainly subtler and more refined than what’s come out since, and McGraw’s hit doesn’t include the head-pounding loudness that sinks so many other 'country' anthems." In a subsequent review, Coyne upgraded the song to an A, as he thought the song's message had become more relevant with increasing age.

== Music video ==
The music video was directed by Sherman Halsey and was released in early 2002.

== Commercial performance ==
"The Cowboy in Me" debuted at number 48 on the U.S. Billboard Hot Country Singles & Tracks for the chart week of December 1, 2001. It reached a peak of number one on the chart dated March 16, 2002, remaining there for one week and displacing Jo Dee Messina's "Bring On the Rain", on which McGraw is a featured artist. This was the first time that an artist replaced themselves at the top based on country radio play, and would not happen again until July 2024 when Morgan Wallen reached number one back-to-back with the singles "I Had Some Help" and "Cowgirls".

== Chart performance ==
Weekly chart performance
Chart (2001–2002)	Peak position
US Hot Country Songs (Billboard)	1
US Billboard Hot 100	33

Weekly chart performance for "Yellowstone Edition"
Chart (2021)	Peak position
Canada Digital Song Sales (Billboard)	38
US Digital Song Sales (Billboard)	19

Yearly chart performance
Chart (2002)	Position
US Country Songs (Billboard)	21

== Certifications ==
Certifications for The Cowboy in Me
Region	Certification	Certified units/sales
United States (RIAA)	Gold	500,000^{‡}
^{‡} Sales+streaming figures based on certification alone.
