= Delicious Surprise =

Studio album by Jo Dee Messina
- Released: April 26, 2005
- Recorded: 2001–2005
- Studios: Starstruck Studios and Emerald Entertainment (Nashville, Tennessee)
- Genre: Country
- Length: 43:58
- Label: Curb
- Producers: Mark Bright; Byron Gallimore; Tim McGraw; Jo Dee Messina

Jo Dee Messina chronology
Greatest Hits (2003)	Delicious Surprise (2005)	Unmistakable: Love (2010)

Singles from Delicious Surprise
- 1. "My Give a Damn's Busted" Released: January 3, 2005; 2. "Delicious Surprise (I Believe It)" Released: June 20, 2005; 3. "Not Going Down" Released: December 5, 2005; 4. "It's Too Late to Worry" Released: July 10, 2006

Professional ratings
Review scores
Source	Rating
AllMusic	4/5 stars
Rolling Stone	2.5/5 stars

Delicious Surprise is the fifth studio album by American country music artist Jo Dee Messina, released on April 26, 2005, via Curb Records. Her first non-Christmas album since Burn (2000), the album was recorded following the release of her first greatest hits collection in 2003. Delicious Surprise is Messina's first album in which she is credited as a producer. Messina also had a bigger hand in the writing of the album, co-writing three songs and solely writing another song.

The album became her third number one on the Top Country Albums chart and her first top ten album on the all-genre Billboard 200, peaking at number seven. The lead single, "My Give a Damn's Busted", became one of her most successful singles to date, topping the Hot Country Songs chart for two weeks. Follow-up singles "Delicious Surprise (I Believe It)", "Not Going Down", and "It's Too Late to Worry", although less successful, all peaked within the top-forty. The album has been certified Gold by the RIAA.

Following this album, Messina wouldn't release another commercially released album until 2014, with her sixth studio album Me. The singer had attempted a follow up to Delicious Surprise titled Unmistakable. Although a few singles were released from the recording sessions, Messina's label constantly delayed the album and it would end up being scrapped and divided into three EPs, with Unmistakable: Love charting on Billboard charts. This would be the last project Messina released for Curb Records before leaving the label in late 2012 to go independent.

== Commercial performance ==
Delicious Surprise debuted on the Top Country Albums on May 14, 2005, at number one, selling 99,000 copies in its first week. Coincidentally, Delicious Surprise went number one on the country charts the same week "My Give a Damn's Busted" rose to the top of the Hot Country Songs chart. The album gave Messina the best first-sales week of her career. The album also managed to debut at number seven on the Billboard 200, surpassing the number-14 peak set by her 2003 Greatest Hits collection to becoming her highest-charting album on that chart. However, the album quickly fell from its peak positions on both charts due to the poor success of the following singles. Delicious Surprise only spent 40 weeks on Top Country Albums and 16 weeks on the Billboard 200.

== Track listing ==
No.	Title	Writer(s)	Length
1.	"Not Going Down"	Kevin Savigar; Shaunn Bolton	3:16
2.	"Someone Else's Life"	Danny Wells; John Bettis; Chris Farren	3:27
3.	"Delicious Surprise (I Believe It)"	Beth Hart; Glen Burtnik	3:48
4.	"It Gets Better"	Jo Dee Messina	4:32
5.	"Who's Crying Now"	Patrick Jason Matthews; George Teren	3:29
6.	"My Give a Damn's Busted"	Joe Diffie; Tom Shapiro; Tony Martin	3:18
7.	"It's Too Late to Worry"	Wells; Ron Harbin; Anthony L. Smith	3:55
8.	"Life Is Good"	Messina; Mark Selby	3:12
9.	"Love Is Not Enough"	Messina; Mike Reid	3:55
10.	"Where Were You"	Messina; John Bettis; Wayne Kirkpatrick	3:31
11.	"I Wear My Life"	Shaye Smith; Katrina Elam; Christi Dannemiller	4:08
12.	"You Were Just Here"	Brett James; Troy Verges; Hillary Lindsey	3:27
Total length:			43:58

== Personnel ==
Compiled from liner notes.

=== Musicians ===
- Jo Dee Messina – lead vocals
- Steve Nathan – acoustic piano (1, 9), synthesizers (1, 9), Wurlitzer electric piano (3), organ (9)
- Jimmy Nichols – keyboards (2, 7, 10, 12), organ (4–6, 8, 11), acoustic piano (5), accordion (12)
- Pat Buchanan – electric guitar (1)
- Michael Landau – electric guitar (1, 3, 9)
- B. James Lowry – acoustic guitar (1, 3)
- Brent Mason – electric guitar (1, 3, 9), acoustic guitar (9)
- Larry Beaird – acoustic guitar (2)
- Troy Lancaster – electric guitar (2, 7, 10, 12)
- Russ Pahl – electric guitar (3), banjo (3), dobro (3), steel guitar (3)
- Tom Bukovac – electric guitar (4–8, 11, 12)
- Bryan Sutton – acoustic guitar (4–8, 10–12)
- Kenny Greenberg – electric guitar (9)
- Paul Franklin –dobro (1, 4, 6, 8, 11), slide guitar (1, 6, 8), steel guitar (4, 5, 7–9, 11, 12)
- Dan Dugmore – steel guitar (2, 10)
- Aubrey Haynie – mandolin (1, 3, 10), fiddle (9)
- Stuart Duncan – mandolin (3, 4, 11), fiddle (3, 4, 6)
- Larry Franklin – mandolin (5, 7)
- Glenn Worf – bass (1)
- Kevin "Swine" Grantt – bass (2, 10)
- Mike Brignardello – bass (3–9, 11, 12)
- Shannon Forrest – drums (1, 4–6, 8, 10, 11)
- Mark Beckett – drums (2)
- Lonnie Wilson – drums (3, 7, 9, 12)
- Bekka Bramlett – tambourine (1), backing vocals (3)
- Javier Solis – tambourine (9)
- Jonathan Yudkin – fiddle
- Lisa Cochran – backing vocals (1, 2, 4–6, 8–11)
- Gene Miller – backing vocals (1, 3, 9)
- Russell Terrell – backing vocals (2, 7, 10, 12)
- Wes Hightower – backing vocals (4–6, 8, 11)
- Kim Parent – backing vocals (7, 12)

=== Production ===
- Byron Gallimore – producer (1, 3–6, 8, 9, 11), mixing (5, 6, 8, 9)
- Tim McGraw – producer (1, 3, 9)
- Mark Bright – producer (2, 7, 10, 12)
- Jo Dee Messina – producer (2, 4–8, 10–12)
- Derek Bason – recording, mixing (2, 10, 12)
- Chris Lord-Alge – mixing (1, 3, 4, 7, 11)
- Scott Kidd – recording assistant
- JR Rodriguez – recording assistant, mix assistant
- Ken Love – mastering at MasterMix (Nashville, Tennessee)
- Mike "Frog" Griffith – production coordinator
- Glenn Sweitzer – art direction, design, photography
- John Scarpati – photography
- Randee St. Nicholas – photography
- John Murphy – wardrobe
- Mark Townsend – hair stylist
- Rachel Dwyer – make-up
- Dreamcatcher Artist Management – management

== Chart performance ==
=== Weekly charts ===
Chart (2005)	Peak position
US Billboard 200	7
US Top Country Albums (Billboard)	1

=== Year-end charts ===
Chart (2005)	Position
US Billboard 200	198
US Top Country Albums (Billboard)	31

=== Singles ===
Year	Single	Peak chart positions		
Year	Single	US Country	US	CAN Country
2005	"My Give a Damn's Busted"	1	63	1
2005	"Delicious Surprise (I Believe It)"	23	–	24
2005	"Not Going Down"	28	–	–
2006	"It's Too Late to Worry"	34	–	–

== Certifications ==
Region	Certification	Certified units/sales
United States (RIAA)	Gold	500,000^{^}
^{^} Shipments figures based on certification alone.
