= Turner Nichols =

- Origin: Nashville, Tennessee, United States
- Genres: Country
- Years active: 1988–1993
- Labels: BNA
- Past members: Tim Nichols; Zack Turner

Turner Nichols was an American country music duo composed of singer-songwriters Zack Turner and Tim Nichols. Signed to BNA Records in 1993, the duo recorded a self-titled debut album for the label that year, with two of that album's singles charting on the Billboard Hot Country Singles & Tracks (now Hot Country Songs) charts. Although it was their only recording together, both members of the duo wrote several songs together in the 1990s, including hit singles for Keith Whitley and Jo Dee Messina.

== History ==
Since the late 1980s, both Zack Turner and Tim Nichols had written hits for other artists, including "I'm Over You", a Top Five hit for Keith Whitley in 1990, as well as a cut on Travis Tritt's debut album Country Club.

Turner and Nichols signed to BNA Entertainment (now known as BNA Records) in 1993 as the duo Turner Nichols. Their self-titled debut album was released that year, with two of its singles reaching the Billboard country charts. Entertainment Weekly reviewer Alanna Nash gave the album a "B" rating, noting the "soulful lyrics and real emotional connections" on cuts such as "Moonlight Drive-In", the first single. "Moonlight Drive-In" peaked at No. 51 on the Billboard country charts, and was followed by "She Loves to Hear Me Rock" at No. 49. These songs respectively reached No. 36 and No. 39 on the RPM Country Tracks charts in Canada.

After exiting BNA in 1993, both members of the duo continued to write songs for other artists, including Jo Dee Messina's 1996 hit "You're Not in Kansas Anymore." Nichols went on to win a Grammy Award for co-writing Tim McGraw's single "Live Like You Were Dying."

== Turner Nichols (1993) ==
Turner Nichols

Studio album by Turner Nichols
- Released: October 26, 1993
- Genre: Country
- Length: 33:59
- Label: BNA
- Producer: Keith Stegall

=== Track listing ===
All tracks co-written by Zack Turner and Tim Nichols; other co-writers in parentheses.

1. "Moonlight Drive-In" (Billy Kirsch) – 3:19
2. "Come Saturday Night" – 2:59
3. "She Loves to Hear Me Rock" – 2:39
4. "Stop Right There" – 3:22
5. "You Can't Hurt Me Anymore" – 3:56
6. "She Needs a Lover" (Keith Stegall) – 3:35
7. "Harleys and Horses" – 3:49
8. "Rose Tattoo" – 3:24
9. "Just So You Know It" (Mike Lawler) – 4:03
10. "Anything" (Lawler) – 3:00

=== Personnel ===
==== Turner Nichols ====
- Tim Nichols – lead vocals, background vocals
- Zack Turner – lead vocals, background vocals

==== Additional musicians ====
- Eddie Bayers – drums
- Paul Franklin – pedal steel guitar
- Rob Hajacos – fiddle
- David Hungate – bass guitar
- Brent Mason – electric guitar
- Gary Prim – piano, keyboards
- Hargus "Pig" Robbins – piano, keyboards
- John Wesley Ryles – background vocals
- Ronny "Hellbilly" Scaife – background vocals
- Biff Watson – acoustic guitar

=== Singles ===
Year	Single	Peak chart positions	
Year	Single	US Country	CAN Country
1993	"Moonlight Drive-In"	51	36
1994	"She Loves to Hear Me Rock"	49	39
1994	"Come Saturday Night"	—	—

=== Music videos ===
Year	Video	Director
1993	"Moonlight Drive-In"	Richard Jernigan
1994	"She Loves to Hear Me Rock"	Jon Small
