= Not Going Down =

Single by Jo Dee Messina

from the album Delicious Surprise
- Released: December 5, 2005
- Genre: Country
- Length: 3:16
- Label: Curb
- Songwriters: Kevin Savigar, Shaunn Bolton
- Producers: Byron Gallimore, Tim McGraw

Jo Dee Messina singles chronology
"Delicious Surprise (I Believe It)" (2005)	"Not Going Down" (2005)	"It's Too Late to Worry" (2006)

"Not Going Down" is a song recorded by American country music artist Jo Dee Messina. The song was written by Kevin Savigar and Shaunn Bolton and produced by Byron Gallimore and Tim McGraw. It was released on December 5, 2005, as the third single from Messina's fifth studio album Delicious Surprise (2005).

The single peaked at number 28 on the US Hot Country Songs chart.

== Charts ==
Chart (2006)	Peak position
US Hot Country Songs (Billboard)	28
US Country (Radio & Records)	98

== Release history ==
Release dates and format(s) for "Not Going Down"
Region	Date	Format(s)	Label(s)	Ref.
United States	December 5, 2005	Country radio	Curb	
