= Dare to Dream (Jo Dee Messina song) =

2002 song by Jo Dee Messina

Single by Jo Dee Messina

from the album Burn
- Released: April 29, 2002
- Genre: Country
- Length: 3:18
- Label: Curb
- Songwriter(s): Adrienne Follesé; Jane Bach
- Producer(s): Byron Gallimore; Tim McGraw

Jo Dee Messina singles chronology
"Bring On the Rain" (2001)	"Dare to Dream" (2002)	"Was That My Life" (2003)

"Dare to Dream" is a song by American country music artist Jo Dee Messina. It was written by Adrienne Follesé and Jane Bach, alongside being produced by Byron Gallimore and Tim McGraw. It was released on April 29, 2002 as the fifth and final single from her third studio album Burn (2000).

It was the least successful single from the album and the only one to miss the top ten of the country charts, peaking at number 23 on the US Hot Country Songs chart.

== Charts ==
Chart (2002)	Peak position
US Hot Country Songs (Billboard)	23

== Release history ==
Release dates and format(s) for "Dare to Dream"
Region	Date	Format(s)	Label(s)	Ref.
United States	April 29, 2002	Country radio	Curb	
