= Me (Jo Dee Messina album) =

Studio album by Jo Dee Messina
- Released: March 18, 2014
- Recorded: 2013
- Studios: Loud Recording (Nashville, Tennessee)
- Genre: Country
- Length: 42:02
- Label: Dreambound
- Producers: Jo Dee Messina; Julian King

Jo Dee Messina chronology
Unmistakable: Love (2010)	Me (2014)	Bridges (2026)

Singles from Me
- 1. "Peace Sign" Released: August 23, 2013; 2. "A Woman's Rant" Released: February 24, 2014; 3. "He's Messed Up" Released: October 27, 2014

Me is the sixth studio album by country singer Jo Dee Messina. The album was released on Messina's own Dreambound Records and distributed by Entertainment One on March 18, 2014. Me is Messina's first album since parting ways with her former label, Curb Records, who launched her career in 1995. The album was "crowd-funded" by help from Messina's fan base and Kickstarter in spring of 2013. The album's lead single, "Peace Sign", was issued to radio on August 23, 2013. A second single, "A Woman's Rant", went to radio on February 24, 2014.

== Background ==
Messina parted ways with her major label, Curb Records in December 2012. Messina admitted, "I am so excited to able to start fresh. I have so much music to share. Getting it out there to the fans is going to be such a blessing." In May 2013, Messina announced that she had partnered with Kickstarter, a website which gives artists "a new way to fund creative projects", to allow her fans to be a part of the album making process. Messina said:

I'm so excited about you being a part of the album-making process, and I'm really looking forward to this new way of making music. Through Kickstarter, we can make the music you want, because you'll be a part of it! / This album is primarily for you—those who appreciate the creative process—as well as for my wonderful fans. Without a doubt, I could not have reached where I am today without your love and support. You have been by my side from the very beginning, and now, I need your support more than ever. This album marks a new beginning for me; I would love for us all to move forward together on this exciting journey.

Throughout the process, her fans helped Messina surpass her $100,000 goal, making her Kickstarter.com campaign the most successful one to come out of Nashville and, at the time of completion, the 15th largest funded music campaign in Kickstarter.com history. Via Facebook, Twitter, YouTube and Stage-It, her fans selected which songs would be included on the album, submitted artwork for her label logo, selected the album title, and chose the album's first single "Peace Sign".

== Promotion ==
On June 3, 2013, Messina performed a new track, "A Woman's Rant", to promote the Kickstarter campaign.

On August 23, 2013, an official lead single, "Peace Sign", was sent to country radio.

"A Woman's Rant" was officially issued to country radio as the second single from Me on February 24, 2014.

Messina visited the Bobby Bones Show on March 4, 2014 to discuss the new album. The program played "A Woman's Rant" on air, and Messina performed her classics "Heads Carolina, Tails California" and "Bye, Bye." During her interview with the radio program, Messina also announced she would embark on an album launch promotional tour during the release week in support of Me.

On March 10, 2014, Messina posted an ad on her Facebook page, confirming that she would tour in support of the album in late 2014. The Me Tour was scheduled to open in October at the Stadium Theatre Performing Arts Centre in Woonsocket, Rhode Island.

On March 16, 2014, Messina announced via her Facebook page that she had to cancel the entire promotional tour for the release week, due to a family emergency.

== Critical reception ==
Me received positive critical reception among many music critics. Steve Leggett gave the album three and a half stars, stating that ultimately, "It's really what Messina has always done, though, and with the freedom granted Me after her release from Curb, she hasn't changed much, which will comfort her many fans." The Daily Country reviewed Me with a full five stars saying, "Jo Dee's latest album proves she is alive and well....and thriving!" Michael McCall of the Associated Press claimed that "Me proves that Messina's fans are right to think she still has plenty to offer."

== Commercial performance ==
Me debuted at number 156 on the U.S. Billboard 200, and at number nineteen on the U.S. Billboard Top Country Albums chart selling 2,600 copies in its first week of release. As of October 15, 2014, the album sold 9,100 copies in the U.S.

== Track listing ==
No.	Title	Writer(s)	Length
1.	"Not Dead Yet"	Alyssa Bonagura, Jo Dee Messina	3:00
2.	"Strong Shot of You"	Sherrié Austin, Weston Davis, Clay Mills	3:03
3.	"Love on a Maybe"	Lizzy McAvoy, Messina	3:42
4.	"Breakin' It Down"	Amy Dalley, James LeBlanc	3:46
5.	"Peace Sign"	Dalley, Tyler Hayes, Scott Leger	3:23
6.	"Me"	Kathie Baillie, Patricia Conroy, Messina	3:43
7.	"Like a Kid Again"	Adrianne Follesé, Keith Follesé, Tammy Hyler	3:51
8.	"A Woman's Rant"	Messina	3:33
9.	"Take It"	Brett James, Hillary Lindsey, Angelo Petraglia	3:26
10.	"I'm Free"	Messina, Dean Sams	3:35
11.	"He's Messed Up"	Bonagura, Messina	2:54
12.	"Say Goodbye to Superman"	Messina	4:28
Total length:			42:02

- "He's Messed Up" includes background vocals sung by some of the Kickstarter campaign backers.

== Personnel ==
- Jo Dee Messina – lead vocals
- Steve Nathan – keyboards
- Jeff Roach – synthesizers
- Dan Dugmore – electric guitars, steel guitar
- Brent Mason – electric guitars
- B. James Lowry – acoustic guitars
- Josh Matheny – dobro
- Ilya Toshinsky – banjo
- Mike Brignadello – bass
- Lonnie Wilson – drums
- Marshall Richardson – drums
- Kathie Baillie – backing vocals
- Alyssa Bonagura – backing vocals
- Michael Bonagura – backing vocals
- Perry Coleman – backing vocals
- Wendy Moten – backing vocals
- Caroline Kelly – backing vocals (11)
- Gaylene Lain Litten – backing vocals (11)
- Susan Rowe-Brooks – backing vocals (11)

=== Production ===
- Jo Dee Messina – producer
- Julian King – producer, recording, mixing
- Jake Burns – assistant engineer
- Jonathan Russell – mastering at Masterfonics (Nashville, Tennessee)
- Paul Grosso – creative director
- Sean Marlowe – art direction, design
- Krista Lee – photography
- Sandel' Cash – logo design
- John Murphy – stylist
- Debbie Dover – hair, make-up

== Chart performance ==
Chart (2014)	Peak position
US Billboard 200	156
US Top Country Albums (Billboard)	19
US Independent Albums (Billboard)	31
