= I'm Done (song) =

Single by Jo Dee Messina
- Released: February 26, 2008
- Genre: Country
- Length: 2:53
- Label: Curb
- Songwriters: Jo Dee Messina; Monty Powell
- Producers: Jo Dee Messina; Jerry Flowers

Jo Dee Messina singles chronology
"Biker Chick" (2007)	"I'm Done" (2008)	"That's God" (2010)

"I'm Done" is a song recorded by American country music artist Jo Dee Messina. It is the first single of her career she co-wrote, writing the song with Monty Powell. She co-produced the single with Jerry Flowers. The song was released on February 26, 2008, as the second single to her planned sixth studio album, Unmistakable, though it ultimately went unreleased. She later issued a series of three EPs (Unmistakable: Love, Unmistakable: Drive, and Unmistakable: Inspiration), though "I'm Done" was not included on any of them.

It peaked at number 34 on the US Hot Country Songs chart, becoming her 19th and final top 40 hit to date.

== Background ==
"I'm Done" was initially released as a digital download on February 26, 2008. It would be sent to country radio on March 5, 2008. Although the singer had co-writing credits on some album tracks, "I'm Done" was the first single Messina released that she had a writer's credit on, co-writing it with Monty Powell. She stated in an interview that the album's release depended on the single's success.

== Chart performance ==
"I'm Done" debuted on the US Billboard Hot Country Songs chart on March 22, 2008, at number 56, becoming the "Hot Shot Debut" of the week. It reached its peak position of number 34 on July 12, 2008, and was her first top-forty hit since 2006. It spent twenty weeks on the chart in total. It is her final single to chart at country radio to date.

== Charts ==
Chart (2008)	Peak position
US Hot Country Songs (Billboard)	34
