= It's Too Late to Worry =

Single by Jo Dee Messina

from the album Delicious Surprise
- Released: July 10, 2006
- Genre: Country
- Length: 3:55
- Label: Curb
- Songwriter(s): Danny Wells, Ron Harbin, Anthony L. Smith
- Producer(s): Mark Bright, Jo Dee Messina

Jo Dee Messina singles chronology
"Not Going Down" (2005)	"It's Too Late to Worry" (2006)	"Biker Chick" (2007)

"It's Too Late to Worry" is a song recorded by American country music artist Jo Dee Messina. The song was written by Danny Wells, Ron Harbin, and Anthony L. Smith and produced by Messina and Mark Bright. It was released on July 10, 2006, as the fourth and final single from her fifth studio album Delicious Surprise (2005).

It proved to have minor success, reaching number 33 on the US Hot Country Songs chart. It is also her last single to have a music video, with it being directed by Peter Zavadil who had directed all of the album's other videos.

The video was steamier than others by Meesina. It featured her getting intimate with an actor in a rainforest.

== Charts ==
Chart (2006)	Peak position
US Hot Country Songs (Billboard)	33

== Release history ==
Release dates and format(s) for "It's Too Late to Worry"
Region	Date	Format(s)	Label(s)	Ref.
United States	July 10, 2006	Country radio	Curb	
