= Grown Men Don't Cry =

Single by Tim McGraw

from the album Set This Circus Down
- Released: March 26, 2001
- Recorded: 2001
- Genre: Country
- Length: 3:55
- Label: Curb
- Songwriters: Tom Douglas; Steve Seskin
- Producers: Byron Gallimore; Tim McGraw; James Stroud

Tim McGraw singles chronology
"Let's Make Love" (2000)	"Grown Men Don't Cry" (2001)	"Angry All the Time" (2001)

"Grown Men Don't Cry" is a song written by Tom Douglas and Steve Seskin and recorded by American country music artist Tim McGraw. It was released in March 2001 as the first single from McGraw's 2001 album Set This Circus Down. The song reached number one on the US Billboard Hot Country Singles & Tracks chart and peaked at number 25 on the Billboard Hot 100.

== Content ==
The song is about a man expressing the sentiment that grown men don't cry.

- In the song's first verse, McGraw describes pulling into the grocery store and observing a boy clinging to his mother's legs. She has mascara-stained tears streaming down her face, resembling a melting ice cream cone, a consequence of years of difficult choices. He buys groceries, gets into his Chevrolet Suburban, and returns home.
- In the song's second verse, McGraw describes a dream about his elderly father, in which he relives being a ten-year-old boy, holding his father's hand as they talk on the front porch, watching the sunset. The dream reflects the man's feelings of being burdened by his father's work. Now that his father is gone, the narrator places a red rose on his grave and speaks to the wind.
- In the song's third and final verse, McGraw expresses his love for his wife and children, describing them as his most cherished possessions. The family goes upstairs to prepare for bed, where his daughter asks for a bedtime story before declaring, "I love you, Dad."

== Critical reception ==
Kevin John Coyne of Country Universe gave the song an A grade, and he praised the "combination of the vivid imagery and McGraw’s plaintive vocal performance." He also said that the second verse "is so well-crafted, and McGraw delivers it so masterfully that it always surprises me, no matter how many times I hear it."

== Chart performance ==
"Grown Men Don't Cry" debuted at number 30 on the U.S. Billboard Hot Country Singles & Tracks chart for the week of March 24, 2001.

Chart (2001)	Peak position
US Hot Country Songs (Billboard)	1
US Billboard Hot 100	25

=== Year-end charts ===
Chart (2001)	Position
US Country Songs (Billboard)	12
US Billboard Hot 100	78
