= Unbroken (Tim McGraw song) =

Single by Tim McGraw

from the album Set This Circus Down
- Released: May 20, 2002
- Recorded: 2001
- Genre: Country
- Length: 4:00 (album version); 3:33 (radio edit)
- Label: Curb
- Songwriters: Annie Roboff; Holly Lamar
- Producers: Byron Gallimore; Tim McGraw; James Stroud

Tim McGraw singles chronology
"The Cowboy in Me" (2001)	"Unbroken" (2002)	"Red Rag Top" (2002)

"Unbroken" is a song written by Annie Roboff and Holly Lamar and recorded by American country music artist Tim McGraw. It was released in May 2002 as the fourth and final single from McGraw's 2001 album Set This Circus Down. The song reached No. 1 on the US Billboard Hot Country Singles & Tracks (now Hot Country Songs) chart in September 2002.

== Content ==
"Unbroken" is a moderate uptempo song set in the key of B major with a tempo of approximately 120 beats per minute.

== Chart performance ==
"Unbroken" debuted at No. 60 on the U.S. Billboard Hot Country Singles & Tracks for the chart week of May 25, 2002 and peaked at No. 1 in September.

Chart (2002)	Peak position
US Hot Country Songs (Billboard)	1
US Billboard Hot 100	26

=== Year-end charts ===
Chart (2002)	Position
US Country Songs (Billboard)	36
