= Havasu =

Havasu (literally "blue-green water", from hava, "air or blue" and su "water") may refer to the following:

- Havasupai, a Native American tribe located in the northwestern part of Arizona
- Havasu Creek, a stream located on the Havasupai Indian Reservation in the Grand Canyon, Arizona
- Havasu Falls, a waterfall located on the Havasu Creek and in the Havasupai Indian Reservation, Arizona
- Havasu Lake, California, an unincorporated community in San Bernardino County, California, United States
- Havasu National Wildlife Refuge, a National Wildlife Refuge on the lower Colorado River in Arizona and California
- Havasu Wilderness, a wilderness area located within the Havasu National Wildlife Refuge in Arizona and California
- Lake Havasu, a large reservoir behind Parker Dam on the Colorado River in Arizona and California
- Lake Havasu City, Arizona, a city in Mohave County, Arizona
- Lake Havasu City Airport, a city-owned public-use airport located near Lake Havasu City, Arizona
- Havasu (album), a 2022 album by Pedro the Lion
