= Angry All the Time =

Single by Tim McGraw

from the album Set This Circus Down
- Released: July 23, 2001
- Genre: Country pop; country
- Length: 4:30
- Label: Curb
- Songwriter: Bruce Robison
- Producers: Byron Gallimore; Tim McGraw; James Stroud

Tim McGraw singles chronology
"Grown Men Don't Cry" (2001)	"Angry All the Time" (2001)	"Bring On the Rain" (2001)

"Angry All the Time" is a song written by Bruce Robison and first recorded on his 1998 album Wrapped. It was later covered by Tim McGraw with guest vocals from his wife Faith Hill. Released in July 2001, McGraw's version was the second single from his Set This Circus Down album. The song reached Number One on the Billboard Hot Country Singles & Tracks (now Hot Country Songs) chart.

== Content ==
The song is a ballad in which the narrator talks about the relationship unraveling.

== Critical reception ==
Deborah Evans Price, of Billboard magazine reviewed the song favorably calling it one of the best ballads of the year. She also says that McGraw's voice "oozes hurt and disillusionment." Kevin John Coyne of Country Universe gave the song an A− grade, saying that the song begins "with the sound of hushed acoustic strumming, the arrangement picks up force as the song progresses, but the focus of attention remains the story of a marriage gradually unraveling. He goes on to say that the song "all comes through in McGraw’s evocative performance, showcasing the layers of subtlety his voice had picked up in the years since his 'Indian Outlaw' days, while wife Faith Hill’s plaintive background vocals add a layer of pathos."

== Chart performance ==
"Angry All the Time" debuted at #48 on the U.S. Billboard Hot Country Singles & Tracks chart for the week of July 28, 2001.

Chart (2001)	Peak position
US Hot Country Songs (Billboard)	1
US Billboard Hot 100	38

=== Year-end charts ===
Chart (2001)	Position
US Country Songs (Billboard)	27
