= I Wish (Jo Dee Messina song) =

Single by Jo Dee Messina

from the album Greatest Hits
- Released: July 21, 2003
- Genre: Country
- Length: 3:33
- Label: Curb
- Songwriters: Ed Hill, Tommy Lee James
- Producers: Byron Gallimore, Tim McGraw

Jo Dee Messina singles chronology
"Was That My Life" (2003)	"I Wish" (2003)	"My Give a Damn's Busted" (2005)

"I Wish" is a song written by Ed Hill and Tommy Lee James and recorded by the American country music artist Jo Dee Messina. It was released on July 21, 2003 as the second and final single from her first compilation album Greatest Hits (2003). It was produced by Byron Gallimore and Tim McGraw.

The song peaked at number 15 on the US Hot Country Songs. It also rose to a peak of number 75 on the Billboard Hot 100, becoming her ninth entry.

== Charts ==
Chart (2003)	Peak position
US Hot Country Songs (Billboard)	15
US Billboard Hot 100	75

== Release history ==
Release dates and format(s) for "I Wish"
Region	Date	Format(s)	Label(s)	Ref.
United States	July 21, 2003	Country radio	Curb	
