= Bridges (Jo Dee Messina album) =

Studio album by Jo Dee Messina
- Released: June 5, 2026
- Genre: Country
- Label: Dreambound
- Producer: David Spencer

Jo Dee Messina chronology
| Me (2014) | Bridges (2026) |

Singles from Bridges
- 1. "Some Bridges" Released: March 13, 2026; 2. "Message in a Bottle" Released: June 29, 2026

Bridges is the seventh studio album by American singer Jo Dee Messina. It was released on June 5, 2026, by Dreambound Records, and was her first album of new material in over ten years. Messina wrote material for the project that reflected a more mature perspective and were based in several challenging experiences she had over the last decade. The album was produced by David Spencer who is also credited as a writer. The title track and "Message in a Bottle" were released as singles.

== Background ==
Jo Dee Messina found country music success in the late 1990s and early 2000s with nine number one singles and 16 that reached the top-40. Messina had not released an album of new music in 12 years and during that period faced several personal challenges. Among them was becoming a single mother, losing her own mother and battling cancer. In the process, she wrote a series of personally-reflective songs that were praised by her peers and gave Messina the encouragement to record an entire album. "It’s about what I’ve gone through and how I’ve gotten through it, and I’m not done living yet," she told Sports Illustrated.

== Recording and content ==
While Messina was gathering songs for Bridges, songwriting colleague, David Spencer, offered to help produce the album. According to Messina, she wrote from a maturer place with Bridges when compared to previous album projects: "I think I have a different perspective now because I've lived through more. There's a bit of wisdom and perspective in these lyrics that you can't have at that age." Some tunes on the album are ballads that offer inspirational messages like its title track, "Some Bridges". The song explains that while society discourages ruining relationships, it is necessary to sometimes "burn bridges" occasion. "Let Me Love You" was adapted from Messina's relationship with her teenage son who was resisting support from his mother when he was getting bullied at school. "Can Anybody" was taken from a conversation she had with another adolescent who felt invisible. Other tracks like "Where the Cowboys Ride" and "Message in a Bottle" are more uptempo and evoke a sound similar to Messina's 1990s hits.

== Release, promotion and critical reception ==
Bridges was announced as Messina's next studio album in March 2026, and in conjunction with the release of its lead single, "Some Bridges". The single was officially released on March 13. It was followed in April by the release of the promotional single, "Don't Let Them Hide Your Beautiful". In May, "Can Anybody" was issued as a promotional single as well. "Message in a Bottle" was released as a single to country radio in June 2026. Bridges was officially released on June 5, 2026 on Dreambound Records. It was offered as a vinyl LP or as a digital release. Her Bridges tour was announced during the same time with shows beginning in June 2026 and ending in early 2027. Will Groff of The Bluegrass Situation praised Bridges, writing, "Sometimes cheeky, often affecting, Bridges condenses a lifetime of lessons into 12 tight tracks."

== Track listing ==
Bridges track listing
| No. | Title | Writer(s) | Length |
|---|---|---|---|
| 1. | "Welcome to the Show" | Jo Dee Messina | 3:20 |
| 2. | "Some Bridges" | Messina; Kathleen Higgins; James T. Slater | 3:15 |
| 3. | "Days You Don't Get Back" | Messina; Ross Copperman; Tyler Hubbard; Jon Nite | 2:33 |
| 4. | "Where the Cowboys Ride" | Messina; Emily Falvey; David Spencer | 3:07 |
| 5. | "Can Anybody" | Messina; Ethan Hulse | 3:43 |
| 6. | "Don't Let Them Hide Your Beautiful" | Messina; Blessing Offor; Spencer | 3:56 |
| 7. | "Message in a Bottle" | Messina; Hulse; Spencer | 2:57 |
| 8. | "The Jesus I Know" | Brennley Brown; Jonathan Gamble; Nick Schwarz | 2:44 |
| 9. | "It's All About You" | Messina; Hulse | 3:07 |
| 10. | "Let Me Love You" | Messina; Tim Nichols; Jonathan Smith | 4:10 |
| 11. | "If He Knew Jesus" | Messina; Spencer; Mark Trussell | 3:32 |

== Personnel ==
Credits are adapted from Tidal.

- Jo Dee Messina – lead vocals (all tracks), background vocals (tracks 2, 3, 5–11)
- David Spencer – production, programming; synthesizer (1, 4, 6, 9, 10), background vocals (3, 5, 7–9, 11), whistle (8), Rhodes piano (11)
- Dave Clauss – mixing
- Joe LaPorta – mastering
- Brandon Shew – engineering assistance
- Elton Charles – drums, percussion
- Justin Brown – keyboards, organ
- Danny Rader – electric guitar (1, 3–10), acoustic guitar (1, 6, 9, 10), guitar (2), banjo (3, 4, 8, 9), mandolin (8, 11), piano (10)
- Troy Brooks – acoustic guitar (1, 3–11), guitar (2)
- Curtis Mcdonald – electric guitar (1, 3–11), guitar (2)
- Kyle Hovland – bass guitar (1, 3–11)
- Regan Cruz – pedal steel guitar (3, 11)
- Justin Schipper – pedal steel guitar (5, 9)
- Keb' Mo' – guitar (7)
- Nick Huddleston – banjo (8)

== Release history ==
Release history and formats for Bridges
| Region | Date | Format | Label | Ref |
|---|---|---|---|---|
| Various | June 5, 2026 | LP; music download; streaming | Dreambound Records | |
