= Was That My Life =

Single by Jo Dee Messina

from the album Greatest Hits
- Released: January 20, 2003
- Genre: Country
- Length: 3:50
- Label: Curb
- Songwriter(s): Marv Green; Bill Luther
- Producer(s): Byron Gallimore; Tim McGraw

Jo Dee Messina singles chronology
"Dare to Dream" (2002)	"Was That My Life" (2003)	"I Wish" (2003)

"Was That My Life" is a song by American country music artist Jo Dee Messina, recorded specifically for her Greatest Hits (2003) compilation album. It was written by Marv Green and Bill Luther and produced by Byron Gallimore and Tim McGraw. It was released on January 20, 2003 as the lead single from the compilation.

It was a moderate hit, peaking at number 21 on the US Hot Country Songs chart.

== Charts ==
Chart (2003)	Peak position
US Bubbling Under Hot 100 (Billboard)	14
US Hot Country Songs (Billboard)	21

== Release history ==
Release dates and format(s) for "Was That My Life"
Region	Date	Format(s)	Label(s)	Ref.
United States	January 20, 2003	Country radio	Curb	
