= I'm Done (film) =

- Title card
- Russian: Я больше не буду
- Directed by: Yevgeni Sherstobitov
- Written by: Zinoviy Gerdt, Mikhail Lvovskiy
- Starring: Andrey Bazykin
- Cinematography: Mikhail Chyornyj
- Edited by: Alla Golubenko
- Music by: Mikhail Boyko
- Production company: Dovzhenko Film Studios
- Release date: August 23, 1976 (Soviet Union)
- Running time: 71 minutes
- Country: Soviet Union
- Language: Russian

I'm Done (Russian: «Я больше не буду», Ukrainian: «Я більше не буду») is a 1975 Soviet musical comedy film directed by Yevgeni Sherstobitov and starring Andrey Bazykin.

== Plot ==
The boy Vova summons the wizard and asks him to find a friend who looks like him. So a man appears in the apartment, both in appearance and in character, similar to Vova. During this time, Vova's double (who received the title of "Vova II") got into a fight with the real Vova, took the ball from a girl, caused a traffic jam on the city street, and misbehaved in the zoo where he went with the girl Lyalya. The actions of the double helped Vova understand a lot about himself when he saw himself from the outside. He asks the wizard to return "Vova II" to the portrait frame.

== Cast ==
- Andrey Bazykin as Vova/Vova II
- Aleftina Evdokimova as Vova's mother
- Oksana Simonova as Lyalya
- Nikolay Gavrilov as Lyalya's grandfather
- Felix Pantyushin as Bondarenko
- Ira Kirichek
- Natasha Rudnenok
- Olya Pogorelova
- Olya Grebenshchikova
- Tanya Tishchenko
- Lida Naumchek
- Vera Kudinova
- Sasha Fedyaev
- Igor Tsulin
- Ivan Postnikov
- Aleksandr Alekseev
- Nina Reus
- Valentin Grudinin
- Raisa Pirozhenko as Neighbor

The film features the dance ensemble The Merry Shoemakers (Russian: Весёлые сапожники) of the Kherson City Palace of Pioneers and Schoolchildren.

== Credits ==
- Directed by Yevgeni Sherstobitov
- Written by Zinoviy Gerdt, Mikhail Lvovskiy
- Music by Mikhail Boyko
- Cinematography by Mikhail Chyornyj
- Edited by Alla Golubenko
- Production Design by Vitali Shavel
- Sound: Leonid Vachi
- Script Supervisor: Yekaterina Shandybina
