= You're Not in Kansas Anymore =

Single by Jo Dee Messina

from the album Jo Dee Messina
- Released: June 24, 1996
- Genre: Country
- Length: 2:53
- Label: Curb
- Songwriters: Tim Nichols; Zack Turner
- Producers: Byron Gallimore; Tim McGraw

Jo Dee Messina singles chronology
"Heads Carolina, Tails California" (1996)	"You're Not in Kansas Anymore" (1996)	"Do You Wanna Make Something of It?" (1996)

"You're Not in Kansas Anymore" is a song written by Tim Nichols and Zack Turner, and recorded by American country music artist Jo Dee Messina. It was released on June 24, 1996 as the second single from her eponymous debut album. The song reached number 7 on the Billboard Hot Country Songs chart.

== Critical reception ==
Deborah Evans Price, of Billboard magazine reviewed the song favorably, calling the production, "right on the mark" and says that it provides a "strong framework for Messina's personality-packed vocals." She also says that the hook is one of the "most clever" to come out of Nashville in recent memory.

== Chart performance ==
"You're Not in Kansas Anymore" debuted at number 66 on the U.S. Billboard Hot Country Singles & Tracks for the week of July 6, 1996.

Chart (1996)	Peak position
Canada Country Singles (RPM)	22
US Hot Country Songs (Billboard)	7

=== Year-end charts ===
Chart (1996)	Position
US Country Songs (Billboard)	66
