= A Joyful Noise (Jo Dee Messina album) =

Studio album by Jo Dee Messina
- Released: October 29, 2002
- Studio: East Iris Studios (Nashville, Tennessee)
- Genre: Country
- Length: 39:19
- Label: Curb
- Producer: Jo Dee Messina, Brent Maher

Jo Dee Messina chronology
Burn (2000)	A Joyful Noise (2002)	Greatest Hits (2003)

A Joyful Noise is the fourth studio album by American country music artist Jo Dee Messina. Her first Christmas album, it was released in 2002 on Curb Records. Its title track peaked at number 16 on the Billboard Hot Adult Contemporary Tracks charts in 2002.

== Track listing ==
No.	Title	Writer(s)	Length
1.	"Winter Wonderland"	Felix Bernard; Dick Smith	3:01
2.	"I'll Be Home for Christmas"	Walter Kent; Kim Gannon; Buck Ram	4:04
3.	"Let It Snow! Let It Snow! Let It Snow!"	Sammy Cahn; Jule Styne	2:15
4.	"The Christmas Song"	Mel Tormé; Robert Wells	4:23
5.	"Silver Bells"	Jay Livingston; Ray Evans	2:47
6.	"Sleigh Ride"	Leroy Anderson; Mitchell Parish	2:32
7.	"Have Yourself a Merry Little Christmas"	Hugh Martin; Ralph Blane	2:57
8.	"What Child Is This?"	Traditional; William Chatterton Dix	2:45
9.	"O Holy Night"	Adolphe Adam; John Sullivan Dwight	4:36
10.	"Silent Night"	Josef Mohr; Franz Gruber	2:34
11.	"A Joyful Noise"	Mark Selby; Tia Sillers	3:50
12.	"Keep the Faith"	Jo Dee Messina; Mike Reid; Brent Maher	3:35
Total length:			39:19

== Personnel ==
- Jo Dee Messina – lead vocals, arrangements
- Howard Duck – acoustic piano, organ
- Steve Nathan – keyboards, acoustic piano
- Bobby Ogdin – keyboards
- Tom Bukovac – acoustic guitars, electric guitars
- John Jorgenson – acoustic guitars
- Brent Mason – electric guitars
- Stuart Duncan – mandolin
- Mike Brignardello – bass
- Spencer Campbell – bass
- Craig Nelson – string bass
- Paul Leim – drums
- Lonnie Wilson – drums
- Sam Bacco – percussion
- Tom Roady – percussion
- Pat Bergeson – harmonica
- Sam Levine – flute, piccolo
- Bill Woodworth – English horn
- Jennifer Kummer – French horn
- Linda Patterson – French horn
- Calvin Smith – French horn
- Cindy Reynolds Wyatt – harp
- The Nashville String Machine – strings
- Bergen White – arrangements and conductor
- Carl Gorodetzky – string contractor
- Bob Bailey – backing vocals
- Lisa Cochran – backing vocals
- Everett Drake – backing vocals
- Kim Fleming – backing vocals
- Ralph Friedrichsen – backing vocals
- Vince Gill – backing vocals
- Vicki Hampton – backing vocals
- Yvonne Hodges – backing vocals
- Crystal Hooper – backing vocals
- Edward Jenkins – backing vocals
- Sherri Kibble – backing vocals
- Derrick Lee – backing vocals
- Gene Miller – backing vocals
- Kim Parent – backing vocals
- Kenny Rogers – vocals
- Jenna Maher – children's chorus
- Emily Smith – children's chorus

=== Production ===
- Jo Dee Messina – producer
- Brent Maher – producer, engineer, mixing
- Justin Niebank – engineer
- Philip Scoggins – assistant engineer
- Sang Park – assistant engineer
- Hank Williams – mastering at MasterMix (Nashville, Tennessee)
- Jan Greenfield – production coordinator
- Sue Austin – creative services coordinator
- Glenn Sweitzer – art direction, design, photography
- Russ Harrington – photography
- Cheryl Johnson – wardrobe design
- Jamie Kimmelman – wardrobe design

== Chart performance ==
Chart (2002)	Peak position
U.S. Billboard Top Country Albums	18
U.S. Billboard 200	147
U.S. Billboard Top Holiday Albums	17
