= My Give a Damn's Busted =

2001 song by Joe Diffie, also recorded by Jo Dee Messina in 2005

Single by Jo Dee Messina

from the album Delicious Surprise
- Released: January 3, 2005
- Recorded: 2004
- Genre: Country
- Length: 3:18
- Label: Curb
- Songwriters: Joe Diffie; Tom Shapiro; Tony Martin
- Producers: Byron Gallimore; Jo Dee Messina

Jo Dee Messina singles chronology
"I Wish" (2003)	"My Give a Damn's Busted" (2005)	"Delicious Surprise (I Believe It)" (2005)

Music video
- "My Give a Damn's Busted" at CMT.com

"My Give a Damn's Busted" is a song written by American country music artist Joe Diffie, Tom Shapiro, and Tony Martin. Diffie originally recorded the song on his album In Another World (2001). It was later recorded by Jo Dee Messina and released by Curb Records as the lead single from her fifth studio album Delicious Surprise on January 3, 2005. Messina's version of the song spent two weeks at number one on the Hot Country Songs chart in May 2005.

== History and content ==
Joe Diffie first recorded "My Give a Damn's Busted" on his 2001 album In Another World. He wrote the song with Tony Martin and Tom Shapiro. Jo Dee Messina recorded the song for her 2005 album Delicious Surprise, with production by Byron Gallimore. The project was Messina's first studio album in four years.

Lyrically, "My Give a Damn's Busted" is about how the narrator refuses to go back to an ex. Chrissie Dickinson, in a Chicago Tribune article republished in the South Florida Sun Sentinel, wrote that Messina's version has a "rocking, funky beat" and "lyrics that are a kiss-off from a fed-up woman to a lying lover." Dickinson also noted that the lyrics reference topics such as Oprah Winfrey, Prozac, and codependency. According to the officially published sheet music, the song has a moderate tempo of about 104 beats per minute in the key of E major, with a chord pattern of E7-Asus4-C-D-E7.

== Music video ==
A music video was released for the song, directed by Peter Zavadil. The main performance takes place in the middle of a big city street, with Messina performing with her band behind her. Also included are scenes of her walking down a sidewalk while being followed by a persistent man, to whom she directs the spoken lines of the song. Other scenes feature her in an alleyway singing alone and in a room with a huge glass mirror. During the parts of the song where the male's parents and therapist are mentioned, Messina is also seen with the man in both situations.

== Personnel ==
Compiled from liner notes.

- Mike Brignardello – bass guitar
- Tom Bukovac – electric guitar
- Lisa Cochran – background vocals
- Stuart Duncan – fiddle
- Shannon Forrest – drums
- Paul Franklin – Dobro, slide guitar
- Wes Hightower – background vocals
- Jo Dee Messina – lead vocals
- Jimmy Nichols – organ
- Bryan Sutton – acoustic guitar

== Charts ==
=== Weekly charts ===
Chart (2005)	Peak position
Canada Country (Radio & Records)	1
US Hot Country Songs (Billboard)	1
US Billboard Hot 100	63
US Billboard Pop 100	73

=== Year-end charts ===
Chart (2005)	Position
US Country Songs (Billboard)	14
Canada Country (Radio & Records)	1

== Certifications ==
Certifications for My Give A Damn's Busted
Region	Certification	Certified units/sales
United States (RIAA)	Gold	500,000^{‡}
^{‡} Sales+streaming figures based on certification alone.
