= Jo Dee Messina (album) =

Studio album by Jo Dee Messina
- Released: March 26, 1996
- Recorded: July 1995
- Studios: Loud Recording Studio, Sound Stage Studios and Pride Music Group Studio (Nashville, Tennessee)
- Genre: Country
- Length: 36:02
- Label: Curb
- Producers: Byron Gallimore; Tim McGraw

Jo Dee Messina chronology
Jo Dee Messina (1996)	I'm Alright (1998)

Singles from Jo Dee Messina
- 1. "Heads Carolina, Tails California" Released: January 22, 1996; 2. "You're Not in Kansas Anymore" Released: June 24, 1996; 3. "Do You Wanna Make Something of It" Released: November 1996; 4. "He'd Never Seen Julie Cry" Released: April 14, 1997

Professional ratings
Review scores
Source	Rating
Allmusic	3/5 stars

Jo Dee Messina is the debut studio album of American country music singer Jo Dee Messina, released in 1996.

It was co-produced by country music artist Tim McGraw and Byron Gallimore, who has also produced all of McGraw's albums. The album's first two singles ("Heads Carolina, Tails California" and "You're Not in Kansas Anymore") both reached the Top 10 on the Billboard Hot Country Singles & Tracks (now Hot Country Songs) charts in 1996, while follow-ups "Do You Want to Make Something of It" and "He'd Never Seen Julie Cry" both failed to enter the Top 40.

The album reached number 22 on the Top Country Albums and number 146 on the Billboard 200. Seven years after its release, it was certified gold in the United States.

== Track listing ==
No.	Title	Writer(s)	Length
1.	"You're Not in Kansas Anymore"	Zack Turner; Tim Nichols	2:53
2.	"On a Wing and a Prayer"	Walt Aldridge; Jo Dee Messina	3:06
3.	"He'd Never Seen Julie Cry"	Leslie Satcher; Max T. Barnes	4:10
4.	"Do You Wanna Make Something of It"	Terry Anderson; Bob DiPiero	2:45
5.	"Let It Go"	Jamie Kyle; Ron Bloom; Will Rambeaux	4:12
6.	"Heads Carolina, Tails California"	Nichols; Mark D. Sanders	3:29
7.	"Walk to the Light"	Aldridge	3:56
8.	"I Didn't Have to Leave You"	Jill Wood	3:48
9.	"Every Little Girl's Dream"	Dave Loggins; Kenny Mims	3:59
10.	"Another Shoulder at the Wheel"	Gary Burr; John Jarrard	3:44
Total length:			36:02

== Personnel ==
Compiled from liner notes.

Musicians

- Jo Dee Messina – lead vocals, backing vocals
- Steve Nathan – acoustic piano, keyboards
- Matt Rollings – acoustic piano
- Larry Byrom – acoustic guitars
- Dann Huff – electric guitars
- Danny Parks – acoustic guitars
- Brent Rowan – electric guitars
- Sonny Garrish – steel guitar, dobro
- Glen Duncan – fiddle, mandolin
- Mike Brignardello – bass
- Glenn Worf – bass
- Bob Wray – bass
- Kenny Aronoff – drums
- Milton Sledge – drums
- Lonnie Wilson – drums
- Tom Roady – percussion
- Stephony Smith – backing vocals
- Cindy Walker – backing vocals
- Curtis Young – backing vocals

Production

- Tim McGraw – producer
- Byron Gallimore – producer, recording (9)
- Julian King – recording (1–5, 7, 8, 10)
- Russ Martin – recording (6)
- Chris Lord-Alge – mixing
- Ricky Cobble – recording assistant (1–5, 7, 8, 10)
- Mark Hagen – recording assistant (1–5, 7, 8, 10), mix assistant
- Craig White – recording assistant (6)
- Doug Sax – mastering at The Mastering Lab (Hollywood, California)
- Missi Callis – production assistant
- Tamara Petrash – production assistant
- Russell Walker – production assistant
- Sue Austin – album design coordinator
- Newman, Walker & Associates – art direction, design
- Randee St. Nicholas – photography
- Total Management – management

== Charts ==
=== Weekly charts ===
Chart (1996)	Peak position
Canadian Country Albums (RPM)	8
US Billboard 200	146
US Top Country Albums (Billboard)	22
US Heatseekers Albums (Billboard)	5

=== Year-end charts ===
Chart (1996)	Position
US Top Country Albums (Billboard)	68

=== Singles ===
Year	Single	Peak chart positions		
Year	Single	US Country	US	CAN Country
1996	"Heads Carolina, Tails California"	2	111	3
1996	"You're Not in Kansas Anymore"	7	—	22
1996	"Do You Wanna Make Something of It?"	53	—	29
1997	"He'd Never Seen Julie Cry"	64	—	—

== Certifications ==
Region	Certification	Certified units/sales
United States (RIAA)	Gold	500,000^{^}
^{^} Shipments figures based on certification alone.
