= Havasu Wilderness =

Protected wilderness area in Arizona and California

- IUCN category Ib (wilderness area)
- Location within the United States
- Location: Mohave County, Arizona & San Bernardino County, California, United States
- Nearest city: Lake Havasu City, AZ
- Coordinates: 34°38′58″N 114°24′54″W
- Area: 17,801 acres (72 km^{2})
- Established: 1990
- Governing body: US Fish & Wildlife Service

Havasu Wilderness is a 17,801-acre (72 km^{2}) wilderness area located within the Havasu National Wildlife Refuge near Lake Havasu in the U.S. states of Arizona and California. 14,606 acres (59 km^{2}) are located in Arizona and 3,195 acres (13 km^{2}) are located in California.

The western boundary of the Wilderness is formed by the Chemihuevi Mountains Wilderness in California. The area includes volcanic spires, a large sand dune with vegetation varying from riparian wetlands to Mojave Desert uplands. The habitats here consist of open water, emergent vegetation, subaquatics, dry mountains, desert uplands and washes.

== Vegetation ==
Vegetation in Havasu Wilderness is dominated by creosote bush, ocotillo, blue-green paloverde, and pockets of saguaro. A variety of trees grow in washes with willows and salt cedar found at the edges of the river.

== Wildlife ==
Havasu Wilderness is home to a variety of wildlife, including species of quail, geese, duck, grebe, crane, rail (including the endangered Yuma rail), heron, egret, falcon, eagle, desert bighorn sheep, coyote, porcupine, fox, and bobcat. Gila monster and the endangered desert tortoise can also be found in the wilderness.

== Recreation ==
Fires, mechanized vehicles, some types of boats, and camping are not permitted in Havasu Wilderness. The most common activities are hiking and wildlife watching.

== See also ==
- List of Arizona Wilderness Areas
- List of U.S. Wilderness Areas
- Wilderness Act
