= Biker Chick =

2007 single by Jo Dee Messina

Single by Jo Dee Messina

from the EP Unmistakable: Drive
- Written: Fall 2006
- Released: July 9, 2007
- Length: 3:05
- Label: Curb
- Songwriters: Kelly Archer; Max T. Barnes
- Producers: Jerry Flowers; Jo Dee Messina

Jo Dee Messina singles chronology
"It's Too Late to Worry" (2006)	"Biker Chick" (2007)	"I'm Done" (2008)

"Biker Chick" is a song by American country music artist Jo Dee Messina. The song was written by Kelly Archer and Max T. Barnes and recorded by Messina during late 2006 in Nashville. The song was produced by Messina and Jerry Flowers, and released on July 9, 2007 as the intended lead single for Messina's album project Unmistakable. "Biker Chick" was instead released on the EP Unmistakable: Drive on November 9, 2010.

== Song information ==
Messina stated that the song was chosen as the lead single from Unmistakable because the owner of her record label, Mike Curb, thought it was a "fun song" and a "great record."

== Chart performance ==
"Biker Chick" debuted at number 59 on the US Billboard Hot Country Songs chart dated July 28, 2007.

== Charts ==
Chart (2007)	Peak position
US Hot Country Songs (Billboard)	48

== Release history ==
Release dates and format(s) for "Biker Chick"
Region	Date	Format(s)	Label(s)	Ref.
United States	July 9, 2007	Country radio	Curb	
