= I'm Alright (Jo Dee Messina song) =

1998 single by Jo Dee Messina

Single by Jo Dee Messina

from the album I'm Alright
- A-side: "Bye Bye"
- Released: May 11, 1998
- Genre: Country
- Length: 3:19
- Label: Curb
- Songwriter: Phil Vassar
- Producers: Byron Gallimore, Tim McGraw

Jo Dee Messina singles chronology
"Bye Bye" (1998)	"I'm Alright" (1998)	"Stand Beside Me" (1998)

Music video
- "I'm Alright" at CMT.com

"I'm Alright" is a song written by Phil Vassar, and recorded by American country music singer Jo Dee Messina. It was released in May 1998 as the second single and title track from her album of the same name. It became her second consecutive Number One hit on the Billboard country charts, spending three weeks at Number One. "I'm Alright" was certified 2× Platinum by the RIAA on September 4, 1998, alongside "Bye, Bye."

Vassar recorded his own version of the song on his 2006 Greatest Hits, Vol. 1 album, with his original lyrics.

== Content ==
The song is an up-tempo in the key of C major, featuring a piano and electric guitar backing with pedal steel guitar and Dobro flourishes. The lyrics centralize on the female narrator, who is conversing with a friend. She details the various events that are going on in her life, such as lacking money and missing friends and family, but still asserts that she "must be doin' alright".

== Music video ==
The music video was directed by Jon Small and premiered in mid-1998.

== Chart performance ==
"I'm Alright" debuted at number 59 on the U.S. Billboard Hot Country Singles & Tracks for the week of May 23, 1998. The song was a Number One country hit in both the U.S. and Canada and reached number 43 on the Billboard Hot 100.

=== Weekly charts ===
Chart (1998)	Peak position
Canada Country Singles (RPM)	1
US Billboard Hot 100	43
US Hot Country Songs (Billboard)	1

=== Year-end charts ===
Chart (1998)	Position
Canada Country Tracks (RPM)	34
US Country Songs (Billboard)	4

=== Certifications ===
Region	Certification	Certified units/sales
United States (RIAA)	2× Platinum	600,000

== Phil Vassar version ==
"I'm Alright"

Song by Phil Vassar

from the album Greatest Hits, Vol. 1
- Released: May 2, 2006
- Genre: Country
- Length: 4:13
- Label: Arista Nashville
- Songwriter: Phil Vassar

Music video
- "I'm Alright" on YouTube

On his album Greatest Hits, Vol. 1, Vassar recorded his own version of the song with some altered lyrics. Unlike the original Jo Dee Messina recording, Vassar's rendition features an extended piano intro and slight lyrical changes.
