= Burn (Jo Dee Messina album) =

Studio album by Jo Dee Messina
- Released: August 1, 2000
- Recorded: 1999–2000
- Studio: Ocean Way Nashville and Loud Recording Studio (Nashville, Tennessee); Essential Sound (Houston, Texas); Studio 56 (Hollywood, California); Extasy Recording Studios (North Hollywood, California); Tyrell Music Studios (Los Angeles, California); Sony Music Studios (New York City, New York)
- Genre: Country
- Length: 42:46
- Label: Curb
- Producer: Byron Gallimore; Tim McGraw

Jo Dee Messina chronology
I'm Alright (1998)	Burn (2000)	A Joyful Noise (2002)

Singles from Burn
- 1. "That's the Way" Released: May 15, 2000; 2. "Burn" Released: October 16, 2000; 3. "Downtime" Released: April 9, 2001; 4. "Bring On the Rain" Released: September 10, 2001; 5. "Dare to Dream" Released: May 11, 2002

Professional ratings
Review scores
Source	Rating
Allmusic	4/5 stars

Burn is the third studio album by American country music artist Jo Dee Messina, released on August 1, 2000, by Curb Records.

Her first No. 1 Billboard album on the Top Country Albums charts, it also hit No. 19 on the Billboard 200. "That's the Way" served as the album's lead-off single, spending four weeks at the top of the Billboard country music charts and becoming a major pop hit, peaking at #25. "Closer" was supposed to be the first single but was switched last minute (they filmed a video for it and it's included on her DVD video collection). Following it was the title track (previously recorded by Tina Arena on her album In Deep) which became a #2 hit on the country music charts and Top 20 hit on the Hot Adult Contemporary Tracks, it gave Messina her first entry on the latter charts. "Downtime" peaked at #5 on the country music charts, followed by another Number One in the Tim McGraw duet "Bring on the Rain". Finally, "Dare to Dream" peaked at #23 in mid-2002. The album has sold over one million copies and was certified Platinum.

== Commercial performance ==
Burn debuted at number one on the Top Country Albums chart and number 19 on the Billboard 200. It would be certified Gold by the RIAA for sales of 500,000 within 20 days.

== Track listing ==
No.	Title	Writer(s)	Length
1.	"Downtime"	Phillip Coleman, Carolyn Dawn Johnson	3:43
2.	"That's the Way"	Annie Roboff, Holly Lamar	3:21
3.	"Dare to Dream"	Jane Bach, Adrienne Follesé	3:18
4.	"Burn"	Tina Arena, Steve Werfel, Pam Reswick	4:39
5.	"If Not You"	George Teren, Tom Shapiro	4:11
6.	"Closer"	Chris Lindsey, Marv Green, Aimee Mayo	4:04
7.	"These Are the Days"	Stephanie Bentley, Lamar	3:49
8.	"Saturday Night"	Tim Nichols, Roboff	3:41
9.	"Angelene"	Bentley, Lamar	3:57
10.	"Nothing I Can Do"	Roy Hurd, Templeton Thompson	4:04
11.	"Bring On the Rain" (duet with Tim McGraw)	Billy Montana, Helen Darling	3:59
Total length:			42:46

UK Bonus Track
No.	Title	Writer(s)	Length
12.	"That's the Way" (UK Radio Remix)	Roboff, Lamar	3:21
Total length:			46:07

== Personnel ==
- Jo Dee Messina – vocals
- Steve Nathan – keyboards
- Steve Conn – accordion (7)
- Michael Landau – electric guitars
- B. James Lowry – electric guitars
- Brent Mason – electric guitars
- Larry Byrom – acoustic guitar (1, 4, 5, 8–10)
- Biff Watson – acoustic guitar (2, 3, 7)
- John Willis – acoustic guitar (6, 11)
- Byron Gallimore – electric 12-string guitar (7)
- Paul Franklin – steel guitar
- Mike Brignardello – bass
- Lonnie Wilson – drums
- Aubrey Haynie – fiddle, octave fiddle (7)
- Kirk “Jelly Roll” Johnson – harmonica (7)
- Kim Parent – backing vocals (1–7, 9)
- John Wesley Ryles – backing vocals (1, 5)
- Chris Rodriguez – backing vocals (2, 3, 6, 7)
- Curtis Young – backing vocals (4)
- Lisa Bevill – backing vocals (8, 10)
- Gene Miller – backing vocals (8, 10)
- Ralph Friedrichson – backing vocals (9)
- Tim McGraw – vocals (11)

=== Production ===
- Byron Gallimore – producer
- Tim McGraw – producer
- Julian King – tracking engineer
- Ricky Cobble – second tracking engineer
- Chad Brown – second tracking engineer (1)
- David Bryant – second tracking engineer (2, 3, 6, 7, 11)
- Greg Fogie – second assistant engineer (5, 9)
- John Peterno – overdub engineer
- Samie Barla – other engineer
- Joe Brown – other engineer
- Dennis Davis – other engineer
- Michael Dy – other engineer
- Rich Hanson – other engineer
- Erik Lutkins – other engineer
- Ronnie Rivera – other engineer
- Jeffrey "Woody" Woodruff – other engineer
- John Van Nest – digital editing
- Chris Lord-Alge – mixing at Image Recording Studios (Los Angeles, California)
- Steve Kaplan – second mixing engineer
- Matt Silva – second mixing engineer
- Doug Sax – mastering at The Mastering Lab (Hollywood, California)
- Ann Callis – production assistant
- Glenn Sweitzer – art direction, design
- Ron Davis – photography
- Claudia Fowler – stylist
- Earl Cox – hair, make-up
- Mary Beth Felts – hair, make-up
- Joel Green – hair, make-up
- Refugee Management – management

== Charts ==
=== Weekly charts ===
Chart (2000)	Peak position
Canadian Country Albums (RPM)	1
US Billboard 200	19
US Top Country Albums (Billboard)	1

=== Year-end charts ===
Chart (2000)	Position
US Top Country Albums (Billboard)	29
Chart (2001)	Position
Canadian Country Albums (Nielsen SoundScan)	63
US Top Country Albums (Billboard)	19
Chart (2002)	Position
US Top Country Albums (Billboard)	27

=== Singles ===
Year	Single	Peak chart positions				
Year	Single	US Country	US	US AC	CAN Country	CAN
2000	"That's the Way"	1	25	—	1	17
2000	"Burn"	2	42	17	*	—
2001	"Downtime"	5	46	—	*	—
2001	"Bring On the Rain" (with Tim McGraw)	1	36	6	*	—
2002	"Dare to Dream"	23	—	—	*	—

== Certifications ==
Region	Certification	Certified units/sales
Canada (Music Canada)	Gold	50,000^{^}
United States (RIAA)	Platinum	1,000,000^{^}
^{^} Shipments figures based on certification alone.
