= I'm Alright (Jo Dee Messina album) =

Studio album by Jo Dee Messina
- Released: March 17, 1998
- Recorded: Fall 1997
- Studio: Loud Recording Studio (Nashville, Tennessee)
- Genres: Country; adult contemporary
- Length: 36:10
- Label: Curb
- Producers: Byron Gallimore; Tim McGraw

Jo Dee Messina chronology
Jo Dee Messina (1996)	I'm Alright (1998)	Burn (2000)

Singles from I'm Alright
- 1. "Bye Bye" Released: January 12, 1998; 2. "I'm Alright" Released: May 11, 1998; 3. "Stand Beside Me" Released: October 12, 1998; 4. "Lesson in Leavin'" Released: April 26, 1999; 5. "Because You Love Me" Released: October 25, 1999

Professional ratings
Review scores
Source	Rating
AllMusic	3/5 stars
Country Standard Time	Neutral

I'm Alright is the second studio album by American country music singer Jo Dee Messina. It was released in 1998. Her highest selling album to date, it has been certified 2× Platinum for U.S. sales of two million copies. The album produced the singles "I'm Alright", "Bye, Bye", and "Stand Beside Me" — all of which reached Number One on the Billboard Hot Country Songs charts — as well as a cover of Dottie West's "A Lesson in Leaving" (titled "Lesson in Leavin'") and "Because You Love Me". Respectively, these last two singles reached #2 and #8 on the country charts.

== Musical style and composition ==
I'm Alright has been described as a contemporary country and adult contemporary album that follows the musical formula of her self-titled debut album, incorporating pop music instrumentation compared to the style of Celine Dion.

== Track listing ==
All songs are produced by Byron Gallimore and Tim McGraw

No.	Title	Writer(s)	Length
1.	"I'm Alright"	Phil Vassar	3:19
2.	"Stand Beside Me"	Stephen Allen Davis	3:41
3.	"Even God Must Get the Blues"	Dene Anton; John Scott Sherrill	3:52
4.	"No Time for Tears"	Steven Dale Jones; Jo Dee Messina	3:26
5.	"Lesson in Leavin"	Randy Goodrum; Brent Maher	3:40
6.	"Bye Bye"	Rory Bourke; Vassar	3:20
7.	"Silver Thunderbird"	Marc Cohn	4:09
8.	"I Know a Heartache"	Charlie Black; Bourke; Kerry Chater	3:29
9.	"Because You Love Me"	Kostas; Sherrill	3:50
10.	"Cover Me"	Trey Bruce; Robin Lee Bruce	3:27
Total length:			36:10

== Personnel ==
- Jo Dee Messina – lead vocals, backing vocals
- Steve Nathan – acoustic piano
- Larry Byrom – acoustic guitars
- Pat Buchanan – electric guitars
- Byron Gallimore – electric guitars
- Dann Huff – electric guitars
- Jeff King – electric guitars
- Michael Landau – electric guitars
- Brent Mason – electric guitars
- Paul Franklin – steel guitar
- Sonny Garrish – steel guitar
- Mike Brignardello – bass
- Lonnie Wilson – drums
- Terry McMillan – percussion
- Glen Duncan – fiddle, mandolin
- Deborah Allen – backing vocals
- Robin Lee Bruce – backing vocals
- Ralph Friedrichsen – backing vocals
- Camillie Harrison – backing vocals
- Kim Parent – backing vocals
- Chris Rodriguez – backing vocals
- Curtis Young – backing vocals

=== Production ===
- Chris Lord-Alge – recording, mixing
- Marty Williams – recording
- Ricky Cobble – recording assistant, additional recording, mix assistant
- Patrick Murphy – recording assistant
- Chris Rowe – recording assistant
- Dennis Davis – additional recording
- Rich Hanson – additional recording, mix assistant
- Julian King – additional recording
- Erik Lutkins – additional recording
- Doug Sax – mastering at The Mastering Lab (Hollywood, California)
- Missi Callis – song assistant
- Michelle Metzger – song assistant
- Ann Callis – production assistant
- Eric Gallimore – production assistant
- Glenn Sweitzer – art direction, design
- Peter Nash – cover photography
- Tamara Reynolds – additional photography
- Sandi Spika – stylist, hair, make-up
- Mary Beth Felts – hair, make-up
- Refugee Management – management

== Charts ==
=== Weekly charts ===
Chart (1998)	Peak position
Canadian Albums (RPM)	96
Canadian Country Albums (RPM)	5
US Billboard 200	61
US Top Country Albums (Billboard)	5

=== Year-end charts ===
Chart (1998)	Position
US Billboard 200	168
US Top Country Albums (Billboard)	23

Chart (1999)	Position
US Billboard 200	100
US Top Country Albums (Billboard)	7

=== Singles ===
Year	Single	Peak chart positions		
Year	Single	US Country	US	CAN Country
1998	"Bye, Bye"	1	43	1
1998	"I'm Alright"	1	43	1
1998	"Stand Beside Me"	1	34	1
1999	"Lesson in Leavin'"	2	28	2
1999	"Because You Love Me"	8	53	11

== Certifications ==
Region	Certification	Certified units/sales
Canada (Music Canada)	Platinum	100,000^{^}
United States (RIAA)	2× Platinum	2,000,000^{^}
^{^} Shipments figures based on certification alone.
