= Because You Love Me =

Single by Jo Dee Messina

from the album I'm Alright
- Released: October 11, 1999
- Genre: Country
- Length: 3:50
- Label: Curb
- Songwriters: Kostas; John Scott Sherrill
- Producers: Byron Gallimore; Tim McGraw

Jo Dee Messina singles chronology
"Lesson in Leavin'" (1999)	"Because You Love Me" (1999)	"That's the Way" (2000)

"Because You Love Me" is a song written by Kostas and John Scott Sherrill, and recorded by American country music singer Jo Dee Messina. It was released in October 1999 as the fifth and final single from her album I'm Alright. The song peaked at number 8 on the Hot Country Singles & Tracks (now Hot Country Songs) chart and peaked at number 11 on the Canadian RPM Country Singles. It also peaked at number 53 on the U.S. Billboard Hot 100.

== Critical reception ==
Deborah Evans Price, of Billboard magazine, reviewed the song favorably, saying that the song reminds everybody that she is "equally capable of wringing every drop of tender emotion from a power ballad." She calls the lyric a "well-written treatise on the impact love can have on a life, and Messina wraps her voice around the sentiment and carries it like a beloved flag."

== Music video ==
The music video was directed by Lawrence Carroll and premiered in October 1999.

== Chart performance ==
"Because You Love Me" debuted at number 51 on the U.S. Billboard Hot Country Singles & Tracks for the week of October 23, 1999.

Chart (1999–2000)	Peak position
Canada Country Singles (RPM)	11
US Billboard Hot 100	53
US Hot Country Songs (Billboard)	8

=== Year-end charts ===
Chart (2000)	Position
US Country Songs (Billboard)	41

== Release history ==
Release dates and format(s) for "Because You Love Me"
Region	Date	Format(s)	Label(s)	Ref.
United States	October 11, 1999	Country radio	Curb	
