= Unmistakable: Love =

EP by Jo Dee Messina
- Released: April 27, 2010
- Genre: Country
- Length: 33:45
- Label: Curb
- Producer: Scott Hendricks

Jo Dee Messina chronology
Delicious Surprise (2005)	Unmistakable: Love (2010)	Me (2014)

Unmistakable: Love is the first extended play by American country music singer-songwriter Jo Dee Messina. The EP was released on April 27, 2010 through Curb Records. Unmistakable: Love is the first volume of a three-part extended play trilogy. The trilogy was initially planned to be full-length studio album, titled Unmistakable, and was scheduled for release on November 6, 2007. Unmistakable: Love includes seven newly recorded songs and two live acoustic recordings of Messina's previous singles, "Because You Love Me" and "Stand Beside Me". The next EPs, Drive and Inspiration, were released on November 9, 2010.

== Track listing ==
No.	Title	Writer(s)	Length
1.	"Hard Life"	Tia Sillers; Angelo T. Petraglia	3:50
2.	"Always Have, Always Will"	Marc Beeson; Stephanie Bentley; Don Pfrimmer	4:00
3.	"Unmistakable"	Chris Farren; Gordie Sampson	3:57
4.	"Welcome to the Rest of My Life"	Steve Stevens; Mallary Hope; Matthew West	3:24
5.	"Treat Me Like a Woman Today"	Kara DioGuardi; Greg Wells	2:35
6.	"I Think About Us"	Jo Dee Messina; Jerry Flowers; Darrell Brown	4:06
7.	"I'm Home"	Jo Dee Messina; Chris Farren	3:47
8.	"Because You Love Me" (live acoustic)	Kostas; John Scott Sherrill	4:19
9.	"Stand Beside Me" (live acoustic)	Stephen Allen Davis	3:47
Total length:			33:45

== Personnel ==
- Brian Chris Autry- bass guitar
- Mike Brignardello- bass guitar
- Tom Bukovac- electric guitar
- John Catchings- cello
- Chad Cromwell- drums
- Connie Ellisor- violin
- Chris Farren- background vocals
- Paul Franklin- steel guitar
- Kenny Greenberg- electric guitar
- Missi Hale- background vocals
- Tania Hancheroff- background vocals
- Tony Harrell- keyboards
- Wes Hightower- background vocals
- David Hofner- keyboards
- Charlie Judge- keyboards
- Jeff King- electric guitar
- Troy Lancaster- electric guitar
- Chris McHugh- drums
- Rob McNelley- electric guitar, soloist
- Jo Dee Messina- lead vocals
- Steve Nathan- Hammond B-3 organ, piano, synthesizer
- Russ Pahl- steel guitar
- Brent Rader- keyboards, percussion
- Michael Rhodes- bass guitar
- Gordie Sampson- acoustic guitar, electric guitar, mandolin
- Bryan Sutton- acoustic guitar
- Robert Vaughn- acoustic guitar, background vocals
- Biff Watson- acoustic guitar
- Lonnie Wilson- drums
- Paul Worley- electric guitar, soloist
- Jonathan Yudkin- mandolin

== Chart performance ==
The album debuted at No. 21 on the U.S. Billboard Top Country Albums chart and No. 106 on the U.S. Billboard 200, selling 5,048 copies in its first week.

Chart (2010)	Peak position
U.S. Billboard Top Country Albums	21
U.S. Billboard 200	106
