= That's the Way (Jo Dee Messina song) =

Single by Jo Dee Messina

from the album Burn
- B-side: "Even God Must Get the Blues"
- Released: May 15, 2000
- Recorded: 1999
- Genre: Country
- Length: 3:21
- Label: Curb
- Songwriters: Annie Roboff; Holly Lamar
- Producers: Byron Gallimore; Tim McGraw

Jo Dee Messina singles chronology
"Because You Love Me" (1999)	"That's the Way" (2000)	"Burn" (2000)

Music video
- "That's the Way" at CMT.com

"That's the Way" is a song by American country music artist Jo Dee Messina. The song was written by Annie Roboff and Holly Lamar, with Byron Gallimore and Tim McGraw producing the song. Messina officially debuted the single at the 35th ACM Awards in 2000, following which Curb Records released it on May 15, 2000, as the lead single to her third studio album Burn (2000).

It was a chart-topping success, topping the US Hot Country Songs chart and marking her highest peak ever on the Billboard Hot 100, hitting number 25.

== Background ==
Messina spoke of the song on country.com, of which she said the song was especially written for her. She said of the lyrics, "They [Annie Roboff and Holly Lamar] said they had read about all the things I had gone through in life, where everything's going great, then you crash, then you go back up again – just the roller coaster ride that I've had. I hope people can relate to it; everybody's lives are filled with ups and downs." "That's the Way" was one of the last songs recorded for the album.

== Critical reception ==
Deborah Evans Price of Billboard magazine reviewed the song favorably, saying that Messina "injects personality galore" into this song. She goes on to call the production, "sonically ambitious, featuring neat percussive elements, tempo changes, and those heavy, layered vocals that Nashville producers are so fond of, these days."

== Music video ==
The music video was directed by Thom Oliphant and premiered in mid-2000. It features Messina performing the song from various colored rooms, both solo and joined by backup dancers. Messina and others are also shown throughout the video climbing the walls and ceiling of the rooms, appearing to defy gravity.

== Track listings ==
US CD Single

1. "That's the Way" - 3:23
2. "Even God Must Get the Blues" - 3:52

UK CD Single

1. "That's the Way" - 3:21
2. "Stand Beside Me" - 3:41

UK Promo CD Single

1. "That's the Way" (UK Radio Remix) - 3:21

== Charts ==
=== Weekly charts ===
Chart (2000)	Peak position
Canada (Nielsen SoundScan)	17
Canada Country Singles (RPM)	1
US Billboard Hot 100	25
US Hot Country Songs (Billboard)	1

=== Year-end charts ===
Chart (2000)	Position
US Country Songs (Billboard)	9
US Billboard Hot 100	74

== Release history ==
Release dates and format(s) for "That's the Way"
Region	Date	Format(s)	Label(s)	Ref.
United States	May 15, 2000	Country radio	Curb	
United States	June 6, 2000	CD single; cassette single	Atlantic	
United Kingdom	September 4, 2000	CD single	Curb; London	
