= Bye Bye (Jo Dee Messina song) =

Single by Jo Dee Messina

from the album I'm Alright
- B-side: "I'm Alright"
- Released: January 12, 1998
- Genre: Country
- Length: 3:20
- Label: Curb
- Songwriters: Rory Bourke; Phil Vassar
- Producers: Byron Gallimore; Tim McGraw

Jo Dee Messina singles chronology
"He'd Never Seen Julie Cry" (1997)	"Bye Bye" (1998)	"I'm Alright" (1998)

Music video
- "Bye, Bye" at CMT.com

"Bye Bye" is a song written by Rory Bourke and Phil Vassar and recorded by American country music singer Jo Dee Messina. It was released in January 1998 as the first single from Messina's album I'm Alright, and her first number-one single on both the U.S. and Canadian country charts, spending two weeks at number one on the former. "Bye, Bye" was certified gold by the RIAA on September 4, 1998, alongside "I'm Alright."

Vassar included his own rendition on his 2006 album, Greatest Hits, Vol. 1, alternating several lyrics in order to be presented from a masculine perspective in contrast to Messina's feminine point of view.

== Music video ==
The music video was directed by Jon Small and premiered in early 1998. It shows Messina driving around in a '67 Pontiac GTO convertible, running away from an unfaithful lover at his house (even at one point literally leaving him in a circle of dust). She is also seen performing the song with her band on a busy city street full of traffic. Her band is dressed in all different vibrant colored clothes. While driving, she constantly tears the rear view mirror off the car. The mirror at one point reflects her street performance of the song. During the bridge, she sings on the hood of the car. It was nominated for the Country Music Association Award for Video of the Year.

== Impact ==
In recent years, Messina and her audience have used the song to joke with each other. A viral TikTok debate broke out over a line in the song, with fans arguing over whether she sings “lead foot down on the accelerator” or “left foot.” Messina joined the fun by posting videos and singing the lyric herself, though some listeners still insisted they heard “left foot,” while others offered increasingly ridiculous interpretations, including “Mike Celerator.” The article concludes that the actual lyric is “Got a lead foot down on my accelerator,” meaning she is speeding away from the failed relationship with no intention of looking back.

== Charts ==
"Bye, Bye" debuted on the US Billboard Hot Country Songs chart at number 59 on January 17, 1998. It peaked at number one, becoming Messina's first number one single on the chart.

Chart (1998)	Peak position
Canada Country Singles (RPM)	1
US Billboard Hot 100	43
US Hot Country Songs (Billboard)	1

=== Year-end charts ===
Chart (1998)	Position
Canada Country Tracks (RPM)	17
US Country Songs (Billboard)	2

== Release history ==
Release dates and format(s) for "Bye Bye"
Region	Date	Format(s)	Label(s)	Ref.
United States	January 12, 1998	Country radio	Curb	
United States	February 1998	CD; cassette single	Curb	

== Certifications ==
Certifications for Bye Bye
Region	Certification	Certified units/sales
United States (RIAA)	2× Platinum	2,000,000^{‡}
^{‡} Sales+streaming figures based on certification alone.
