= Tim Nichols =

American country singer and songwriter

- Born: Portsmouth, Virginia, United States
- Genres: Country
- Occupation: Singer-songwriter
- Instrument: Vocals
- Years active: 1989–present
- Formerly of: Turner Nichols

Tim Nichols (born in Portsmouth, Virginia) is an American country music singer and songwriter. Active since the late 1980s, Nichols has written for several country music singers including Keith Whitley, Tim McGraw, Faith Hill, Jo Dee Messina, and Alan Jackson. He and songwriter Zack Turner recorded one album for BNA Entertainment (now BNA Records) in 1993 as the duo Turner Nichols, in addition to charting two singles as one half of that duo. Nichols, along with Craig Wiseman, earned a Grammy Award for Best Country Song in 2004, for McGraw's Number One hit "Live Like You Were Dying".

== Biography ==
Tim Nichols was born on August 5, 1958, in Portsmouth, Virginia but his family moved between there and Springfield, Missouri. While in college, he pursued a broadcasting major, although the college soon dropped their programming. From there, he went to manufacture buckets for the fast-food chain KFC. Nichols started taking guitar lessons as well, and soon founded a band which played locally. His guitar teacher recommended him to a man who told Nichols that he could find a record deal. The man was a scam artist, however, and Nichols later went to the Attorney General's office to reclaim the money. After his experience, Nichols was featured in a 60 Minutes exposé about Nashville scam artists, and helped his local band gain exposure.

Later on, Nichols and his band moved to Nashville, Tennessee, and by 1984 he had signed to a publishing contract with a company owned by Ronnie Milsap. At a songwriters' night at the Bluebird Café in Nashville, Nichols met Zack Turner through a friend. The two began writing together, and one of their collaborations, "I'm Over You", was recorded by Keith Whitley, whose rendition was a Top Five country hit shortly after his death in 1989. Both artists continued writing for other artists, with Nichols's first cut as a songwriter being "This Time Last Year", which Milsap recorded. Nichols also met Giles Godard, with whom he would later collaborate as well. By the early 1990s, Nichols had also had several more chart singles as a songwriter, including Milsap's "All Is Fair in Love and War", Billy Dean's "Tryin' to Hide a Fire in the Dark", and another posthumous release from Whitley, "Brotherly Love" (a duet with Earl Thomas Conley).

=== Turner Nichols ===
Turner and Nichols signed in 1993 to a recording contract with BNA Entertainment (now known as BNA Records), releasing an album that year as the duo Turner Nichols. This album, co-written almost entirely by the duo, included the singles "Moonlight Drive-In" and "She Loves to Hear Me Rock", both of which charted on the Billboard and RPM country charts in the US and Canada, respectively. Turner and Nichols never recorded any other material, although they co-wrote Jo Dee Messina's 1996 single "You're Not in Kansas Anymore", and Nichols also co-wrote Messina's debut single, "Heads Carolina, Tails California".

=== Mid-1990s-present ===
Since the disbanding of Turner Nichols, Nichols continued to write songs. Three of Nichols's songs have become Number One hits on the country charts: "(This Ain't) No Thinkin' Thing" by Trace Adkins, "Girls Lie Too" by Terri Clark, and "Live Like You Were Dying" by Tim McGraw (which preceded "Girls Lie Too" at #1). "Live Like You Were Dying" also earned Nichols and Craig Wiseman, the song's other co-writer, the Grammy Award for Best Country Song at the 47th Grammy Awards, as well as the Song of the Year award from the Academy of Country Music. Nichols and Wiseman also wrote Faith Hill's "A Baby Changes Everything", a Number One hit on the Adult Contemporary charts in December 2008. Other artists who have recorded Nichols's material include Tracy Byrd, Alan Jackson, Patty Loveless and Lee Ann Womack.

== List of singles written by Tim Nichols ==
Nichols co-wrote the following singles:

- Trace Adkins – "(This Ain't) No Thinkin' Thing"
- Tracy Byrd – "When Mama Ain't Happy"
- Terri Clark – "I Wanna Do It All", "Girls Lie Too"
- John Corbett – "Good to Go"
- Billy Dean – "Tryin' to Hide a Fire in the Dark"
- Ricky Lynn Gregg – "Careful What You Wish For"
- Lila McCann – "Mighty Mighty Love"
- Faith Hill – "A Baby Changes Everything"
- Alan Jackson – "That'd Be Alright", "I Only Want You For Christmas"
- Sarah Johns – "He Hates Me"
- David Kersh – "Something to Think About"
- Sammy Kershaw – "Vidalia"
- Brett Kissel – "3-2-1", "Ain't the Same"
- Jana Kramer – "I Got the Boy"
- Shannon Lawson – "Dream Your Way to Me"
- Patty Loveless – "That's the Kind of Mood I'm In"
- Dustin Lynch – "Cowboys and Angels", "She Cranks My Tractor"
- Reba McEntire – "I'd Rather Ride Around with You"
- Tim McGraw – "Live Like You Were Dying"
- Jo Dee Messina – "Heads Carolina, Tails California", "You're Not in Kansas Anymore"
- Ronnie Milsap – "All Is Fair in Love and War"
- Joe Nichols – "She Only Smokes When She Drinks"
- Turner Nichols – "Moonlight Drive-In", "She Loves to Hear Me Rock", "Come Saturday Night"
- Jamie O'Neal – "I Love My Life"
- James Otto – "Sunday Morning and Saturday Night"
- Michael Peterson – "Somethin' 'bout a Sunday"
- Blackhawk – "One Night in New Orleans"
- Aaron Tippin – "A Door"
- Zach Top, "I Never Lie"
- Van Zant – "Nobody Gonna Tell Me What to Do"
- Keith Whitley – "I'm Over You", "Brotherly Love" (duet with Earl Thomas Conley)
- Lee Ann Womack – "I'll Think of a Reason Later"
- Chris Young – "The Man I Want to Be"
- Keith Anderson – "I Still Miss You"
