= Stand Beside Me =

Single by Jo Dee Messina

from the album I'm Alright
- Released: October 12, 1998
- Genre: Country
- Length: 3:44
- Label: Curb
- Songwriter: Stephen Allen Davis
- Producers: Byron Gallimore; Tim McGraw

Jo Dee Messina singles chronology
"I'm Alright" (1998)	"Stand Beside Me" (1998)	"Lesson in Leavin'" (1999)

Music video
- "Stand Beside Me" at CMT.com

"Stand Beside Me" is a song written by Stephen Allen Davis and recorded by American country music singer Jo Dee Messina. It was released in October 1998 as the third single from her album I'm Alright. The song spent three weeks at the top of the Hot Country Singles & Tracks chart, making Messina the first female artist to score three multi-week number-one singles from one album.

== Music video ==
The music video was directed by Jim Shea and premiered in October 1998.

== Charts ==
"Stand Beside Me" debuted at number 71 on the U.S. Billboard Hot Country Singles & Tracks for the week of October 10, 1998.

Chart (1998–1999)	Peak position
Canada Country Singles (RPM)	1
US Billboard Hot 100	34
US Hot Country Songs (Billboard)	1

=== Year-end charts ===
Chart (1999)	Position
Canada Country Tracks (RPM)	39
US Country Songs (Billboard)	7
