= Downtime (Jo Dee Messina song) =

2001 single by Jo Dee Messina

Single by Jo Dee Messina

from the album Burn
- Released: April 9, 2001
- Genre: Country
- Length: 3:43
- Label: Curb
- Songwriter(s): Phillip Coleman; Carolyn Dawn Johnson
- Producer(s): Byron Gallimore; Tim McGraw

Jo Dee Messina singles chronology
"Burn" (2000)	"Downtime" (2001)	"Bring On the Rain" (2001)

"Downtime" is a song written by Phillip Coleman and Carolyn Dawn Johnson, and recorded by American country music singer Jo Dee Messina. It was released in April 2001 as the third single from her album Burn. The song peaked at number 5 on the Hot Country Singles & Tracks chart and number 46 on the U.S. Billboard Hot 100.

== Charts ==
"Downtime" debuted at number 50 on the U.S. Billboard Hot Country Singles & Tracks chart for the week of April 14, 2001.

Chart (2001)	Peak position
US Billboard Hot 100	46
US Hot Country Songs (Billboard)	5

=== Year-end charts ===
Chart (2001)	Position
US Country Songs (Billboard)	31
