= Bring On the Rain =

2001 single performed by Jo Dee Messina

Single by Jo Dee Messina with Tim McGraw

from the album Burn
- Released: September 10, 2001
- Genre: Country
- Length: 3:59 (album version); 2:59 (radio edit)
- Label: Curb
- Songwriters: Billy Montana; Helen Darling
- Producers: Byron Gallimore; Tim McGraw

Jo Dee Messina singles chronology
"Downtime" (2001)	"Bring On the Rain" (2001)	"Dare to Dream" (2002)

Tim McGraw singles chronology
"Angry All the Time" (2001)	"Bring On the Rain" (2001)	"The Cowboy in Me" (2001)

Music video
- "Bring On the Rain" at CMT.com

"Bring On the Rain" is a song written by Billy Montana and Helen Darling and recorded by American country music artist Jo Dee Messina. It was released in September 2001 as the fourth single from her album Burn. In March 2002, it became Messina's fifth number one country single, and her highest entry on the Adult Contemporary charts.

== Content ==
"Bring On the Rain" is a mid-tempo country pop ballad. In it, the narrator tells that she has had a bad day, but is not let down by it, and is ready for another day as well: "Tomorrow's another day / And I'm thirsty anyway / So bring on the rain." Tim McGraw sings background vocals throughout.

Messina said that, from the first listen, she "loved" the song, and thought that its message would resonate well, considering that it was released a day before the September 11 attacks. After the song had peaked, her fan club received an e-mail from a woman whose daughter was undergoing chemotherapy. In the letter, the mother explained that her daughter quoted the chorus to her.

It was used on the Touched by an Angel episode Bring On the Rain.

== Awards ==
"Bring on the Rain" received a Grammy Award nomination for Best Country Collaboration with Vocals, and a Vocal Event of the Year nomination from the Academy of Country Music.

== Chart performance ==
"Bring On the Rain" debuted at number 53 on the U.S. Billboard Hot Country Singles & Tracks for the week of September 15, 2001. "Bring on the Rain" reached its peak of number one on the Hot Country Singles & Tracks (now Hot Country Songs) charts for the week of March 9, 2002. During most of its chart run, it overlapped with McGraw's then-current single "The Cowboy in Me", which took over the number one spot a week later. The song was also Messina's highest entry on the Hot Adult Contemporary Tracks charts, peaking at number 6 there.

== Charts ==
=== Weekly charts ===
Chart (2001–2002)	Peak position
US Billboard Hot 100	36
US Adult Contemporary (Billboard)	6
US Hot Country Songs (Billboard)	1

=== Year-end charts ===
Chart (2002)	Position
US Adult Contemporary (Billboard)	14
US Hot Country Songs (Billboard)	16

== Certifications ==
Certifications for Bring On The Rain
Region	Certification	Certified units/sales
United States (RIAA)	Gold	500,000^{‡}
^{‡} Sales+streaming figures based on certification alone.

== Release history ==
Release date and formats for "Bring On the Rain"
Region	Date	Format(s)	Label(s)	Ref.
United States	September 10, 2001	Country radio	Curb	
United States	January 28, 2002	Adult contemporary radio	Curb	
