= Heads Carolina, Tails California =

1996 song by Jo Dee Messina

Single by Jo Dee Messina

from the album Jo Dee Messina
- B-side: "Walk to the Light"
- Released: January 22, 1996
- Genre: Country rock
- Length: 3:29
- Label: Curb
- Songwriters: Tim Nichols; Mark D. Sanders
- Producers: Byron Gallimore; Tim McGraw

Jo Dee Messina singles chronology
"Heads Carolina, Tails California" (1996)	"You're Not in Kansas Anymore" (1996)

Music video
- "Heads Carolina, Tails California" at CMT.com

"Heads Carolina, Tails California" is a song written by Tim Nichols and Mark D. Sanders and recorded by American country music artist Jo Dee Messina. The song was released in January 1996 as her debut single and served as the lead-off single for her self-titled debut album. The song reached the Top 10 on both the U.S. and Canadian country charts.

American Aquarium covered the song on their 2021 album Slappers, Bangers, and Certified Twangers: Vol 1. The song enjoyed a revival in 2022 when it was used as the basis for Cole Swindell's number one hit "She Had Me at Heads Carolina", eventually propelling the original song to a platinum certification by the RIAA.

== Content ==
"Heads Carolina, Tails California" is an up-tempo song about a narrator who wants to just take her love and run off together somewhere, but anywhere will do as long as her love comes with her.

== Critical reception ==
Deborah Evans Price, of Billboard magazine reviewed the song favorably, calling it a "rollicking country ode to flipping a coin and hitting the road in search of a better life 'somewhere greener, somewhere warmer.' She also said that "passion and energy permeate Messina's strong vocal attacks on this infectious tune."

In 2022, Cole Swindell, Ashley Gorley, Jesse Frasure, and Thomas Rhett re-wrote the song as "She Had Me at Heads Carolina", which heavily references "Heads Carolina, Tails California" and incorporates its melody. Additional co-writers' credit was also given to Sanders and Nichols. This song appears on Swindell's 2022 album Stereotype, from which it was released as the third single. On November 7, 2022, Swindell released a remixed version of the song which featured new vocals by Messina.

In 2024, Rolling Stone ranked the song at #172 on its 200 Greatest Country Songs of All Time ranking.

== Music video ==
A music video was released for the song directed by Roger Pistole and filmed in the Mojave Desert. Messina is shown performing with an old-fashioned microphone in a run-down wooden shack in the desert and leaning against the counter of a diner, dressed as a waitress. Throughout the video are scenes of men traveling on an old dirt road pushing tires with them. They are seen sitting in the diner that Messina is seen in, and outside of a rural gas station in which the diner is located.

== Chart performance ==
"Heads Carolina, Tails California" debuted at number 70 on the U.S. Billboard Hot Country Singles & Tracks for the week of January 27, 1996. It would soon reach number 2 on that chart, behind "My Maria" by Brooks & Dunn.

Chart (1996)	Peak position
Canada Country Singles (RPM)	3
US Bubbling Under Hot 100 (Billboard)	11
US Hot Country Songs (Billboard)	2

=== Year-end charts ===
Chart (1996)	Position
Canada Country Tracks (RPM)	26
US Country Songs (Billboard)	52

== Certifications ==
Certifications for Heads Carolina, Tails California
Region	Certification	Certified units/sales
United States (RIAA)	Platinum	1,000,000^{‡}
^{‡} Sales+streaming figures based on certification alone.
