= Jo Dee Messina =

American country singer (born 1970)

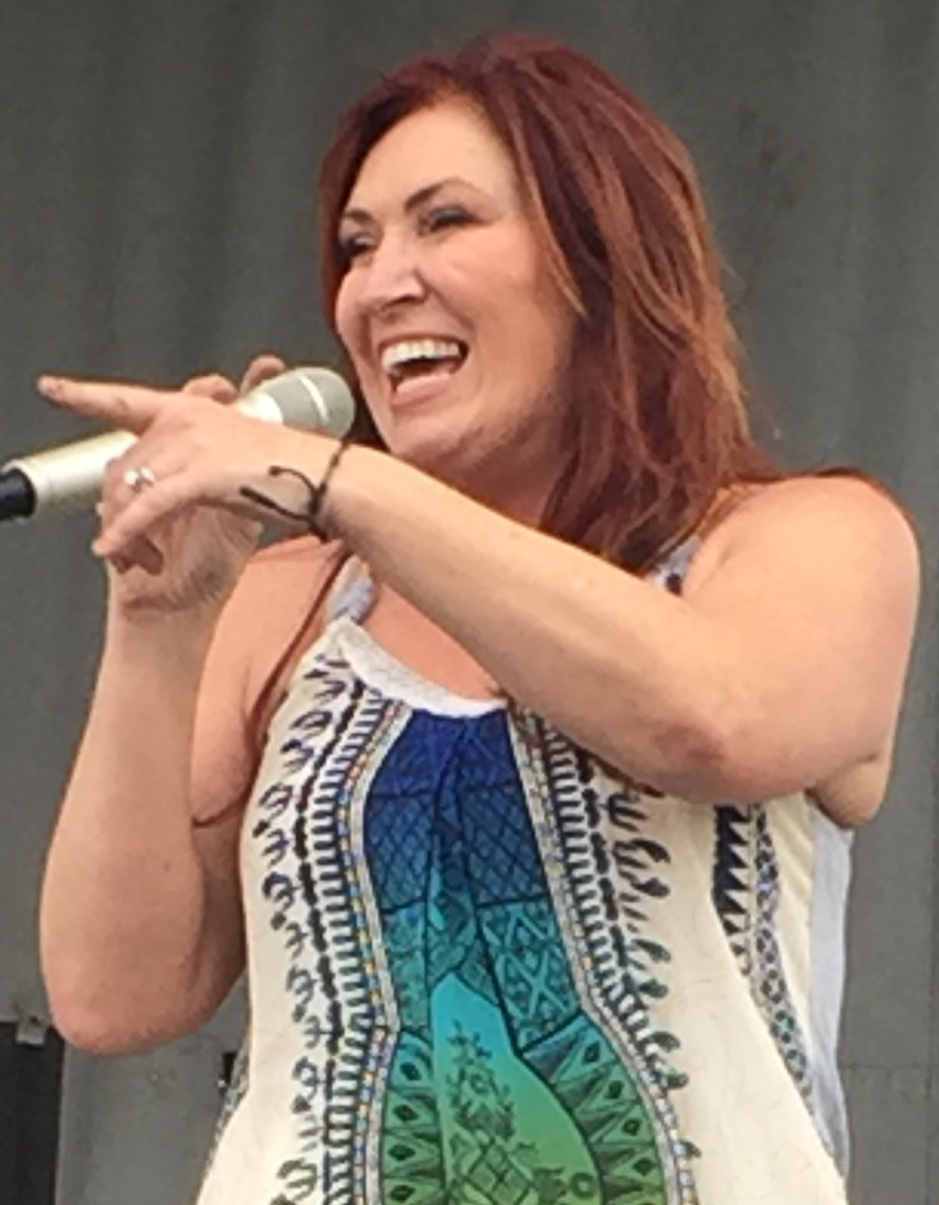
- Messina performing in Tampa, Florida, on March 19, 2016

Background information
- Born: Jo Dee Marie Messina; August 25, 1970 (age 56); Framingham, Massachusetts, U.S.
- Origin: Holliston, Massachusetts, U.S.
- Genre: Country
- Occupations: Singer; songwriter
- Instruments: Vocals; guitar; piano; trumpet
- Years active: 1994–present
- Labels: RCA; Curb; Dreambound
- Spouse: Chris Deffenbaugh (m. 2007)
- Website: www.jodeemessina.com

Jo Dee Marie Messina (born August 25, 1970) is an American country music artist. She has charted six number-one singles on the Billboard country music charts. She has been honored by the Country Music Association and the Academy of Country Music, and has been nominated for two Grammy Awards. She was the first female country artist to score three multiple-week number-one songs from the same album. To date, she has two platinum and three gold-certified albums by the RIAA.

Messina debuted in 1996 with the single "Heads Carolina, Tails California." Her album was certified gold by the RIAA. Her second album, I'm Alright, produced five top-10 country hits between 1998 and 1999, and sold over a million copies in America. Since her debut, six of her singles have peaked at number one on the Billboard country singles chart and five of her albums have received a certification by the RIAA or the CRIA. She has sold over 5 million records worldwide.

== Early life ==
Jo Dee Marie Messina was born on August 25, 1970, in Framingham, Massachusetts, to Vincent and Mary Messina. Her father, of Italian descent, and mother, of Irish descent, raised her in Holliston, Massachusetts, alongside sisters, Terese and Marianne, and a brother, Vincent. At an early age, Messina's love for music blossomed. She drew influence from a variety of country music artists, including Patsy Cline, Reba McEntire, and The Judds. By age 16, she was playing local clubs, singing while her brother and sister provided backup on drums and guitar. The group continued performing until Jo Dee graduated from high school.

Realizing that living in the Northeast would limit her chances of achieving country music stardom, Messina moved to Nashville, Tennessee, at age 19. She worked various temporary jobs, including computer programming and accounting, while entering talent contests around Nashville.

One win led to a regular gig on the radio show Live at Libby's, which caught the interest of producer Byron Gallimore, who helped her assemble a demonstration tape.

All looked up when she was signed with RCA Records, but was subsequently dropped from the label after a management shakeup.

Gallimore was also working with the young Tim McGraw around the same time, and Messina befriended him. Backstage at one of his concerts, McGraw met an executive from his label, Curb Records, and jokingly suggested that they needed a redhead. With the help of fellow Curb producer James Stroud, Messina was soon signed to the record label. Gallimore and McGraw later became co-producers of Messina's studio albums for Curb.

== Music career ==
=== 1996–97: Country success ===
Messina released her self-titled debut album in 1996. It spawned two top-10 hits, starting with the lead single, "Heads Carolina, Tails California", which peaked at number two on the country charts and its follow-up, "You're Not in Kansas Anymore" gained similar success. However, the two additional singles released from the album, "Do You Wanna Make Something of It" and "He'd Never Seen Julie Cry" peaked outside the country top 40 and were minor hits between 1996 and 1997. Following her major success, Messina performed 215 shows in 1996 and became one of the most successful new female vocalists of the 1990s. Her debut album sold over 500,000 copies and was certified gold by the RIAA.

Messina's finances suffered due to a series of poor business decisions and a change of management that led her to nearly declaring bankruptcy; she nearly lost her home and her car. She spent nearly a year trying to write new songs and material for a new album that could help bring herself out of bankruptcy. She credited the radio success of "Bye, Bye" and "I'm Alright" with giving her a "second chance".

=== 1998−2006: Breakthrough success ===
Messina released her second album in 1998, I'm Alright. The album spawned three number-one hit singles on the Billboard Country Chart that year: "Bye, Bye"; "I'm Alright"; and "Stand Beside Me", all three of which charted on the Billboard Hot 100, as well. The fourth single, "Lesson in Leavin", was a cover of Dottie West's 1980 number-one country hit. The song peaked at number two for seven weeks. In 1999, she had another top-10 hit from the album, "Because You Love Me", which peaked at number eight on the Billboard Country Chart.

In 2000, Messina received the Country Music Association's Horizon Award, which is awarded to new country music artists. She also won the Billboard "Most Played Female at Country Radio", and won three major awards from the Boston Music Awards, located in her home state of Massachusetts.

Messina's album became her biggest-selling album to date, selling over two million copies in the US, receiving an RIAA certification of double platinum. She released her third studio album, Burn in 2000, which aimed towards country pop-styled music. The album's lead single, "That's the Way" peaked at number one on the Billboard Country Chart and also became her highest-charting single on the Billboard Hot 100, peaking at number 25. Following that success, she had two additional top-10 hits with "Burn" and "Downtime".

Messina had another number-one hit from the album in 2001 with "Bring On the Rain", a duet with Tim McGraw that also became a top-10 hit on the Adult Contemporary Chart, peaking at number six. In addition to headlining concerts, she also toured with Vince Gill, George Strait, and The Judds' reunion tour.

Messina released her first holiday album in 2002 with A Joyful Noise. The title track was released as a single and peaked at number 16 on the adult contemporary chart in 2003. The album consisted of remakes of established holiday songs. Messina planned to release a new album in 2003, but a Greatest Hits album was released, instead, due to delays. The album covered most of Messina's hits between 1996 and 2003, and also included four new songs, including two that were released as singles. The first, "Was That My Life", peaked in the top 25 and the second, "I Wish", became a top-15 hit. The album was also certified gold by RIAA. By 2004, Messina had been struggled with alcohol addiction. That February, her then-manager Stuart Dill requested her to get checked in to rehab after a post-game performance at Super Bowl XXXVIII in Houston where she forgot the lyrics to some of her songs. She checked into a Utah therapy center for 30 days and spent the rest of her rehab as an outpatient for next two months.

In 2005, Messina released her first country music studio album since 2000, Delicious Surprise. It peaked at number one on the Billboard Top Country Albums chart and number 9 on Billboard 200. It sold over 500,000 copies and became her fourth album to receive an RIAA gold certification. The lead single, "My Give a Damn's Busted" (co-written by country music star Joe Diffie), peaked at number one on the Billboard Country Chart and became Messina's first number-one single since “Bring On the Rain” in 2002, and her last number one hit of her career. The three follow-up singles - "Delicious Surprise (I Believe It)" "Not Going Down," and "It's Too Late To Worry" - were minor top-40 hits on the Billboard country chart between 2005 and 2006.

=== 2007–2012: Unmistakable ===
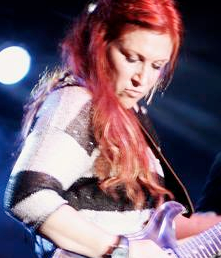
Messina in 2013

Messina released a new single in July 2007, "Biker Chick", from her fifth studio album, Unmistakable. It was written by Kelly Archer and Max T. Barnes and was recorded in the fall of 2006 in Nashville. Although the album was set for release on November 6, 2007, it was shelved, and the single was dropped from country radio after spending 9 weeks on the charts, rising to a peak of number 48.

On March 22, 2008, Messina released her second single from Unmistakable, titled "I'm Done". The single peaked at number 34 on the Billboard Country Chart. Messina, who co-wrote the song, explained that the release of the album was "truly dictated by the success of the single." On June 10, 2008, Messina and Phil Vassar opened the 2008 CMA Music Festival, where she performed her two number-one hits, "Bye, Bye" and "I'm Alright", both co-written by Vassar.

She performed her latest single, "I'm Done", which received a positive reaction from the audience that day. In early 2009, she released Shine, but at the last minute, her record label decided not to release it, and the album was pushed back again.

In January 2010, Messina released the single, "That's God", although it failed to chart. Messina began debuting the single in late 2009 on her Music Room Series tour. "My heart is exploding with excitement. This song is truly what I want to say. I believe in it and its message." Having had her first child in January 2009, Messina was inspired to write the song while spending time with her son on a trip to Jasper, Alberta in Canada, where she saw mountains with glacier lakes. The single received a negative review at Engine 145, where critic Sam Gadzidak thought that it was derivative of Lee Ann Womack's "There Is a God".

She later announced that the album would be released in a trilogy of extended plays, beginning with Unmistakable: Love, released on April 27, 2010. It was followed by two additional extended plays, Drive and Inspiration, both released on November 9, 2010, in MP3 format.

In 2011, Messina signed to promote the WD-40 line of cleaners with a campaign called "Unmistakably Clean". A collection of her songs is available for free download with the purchase of specially marked Spot Shot, Carpet Fresh, 2000 Flushes, or X-14.

In 2012, Messina was featured on the fourth season of Bravo's hit reality show The Real Housewives of Atlanta. On the show, Messina and cast member Kandi Burruss collaboratively wrote a song, Burruss' first effort at creating country music. In December 2012, she completed her 17-year contract with Curb Records.

=== 2013–present: Independent Label, Dreambound Records ===
In May 2013, Messina started a Kickstarter campaign to fund her next album. The lead single, "Peace Sign", was released on August 23, 2013, by Dreambound Records. The full-length album, Me, was released on March 18, 2014, featuring 12 new songs. "A Woman's Rant" and "He's Messed Up" were released in 2014 as the second and third singles from the album, respectively, and Messina embarked on the Me Tour in support of the album in October 2014.

Messina has been performing new self-penned songs "Will You Love Me" and "Masquerade" at shows since 2015. While Messina anticipated that they would be a part of a new EP, entitled Masquerade, she has since reassessed the direction of her music and is continuing to write new material, mostly faith-based in an effort to share God's word, for an eventual project.

In April 2018, Messina appeared on Huckabee on Trinity Broadcasting Network, to debut her new song, written by Messina with producer Seth Mosley, "Bigger Than This". The song caught the attention of the country music and Christian music industries, giving Messina the opportunity to bring new tracks to existing fans, while also introducing herself into an entirely new space. To follow up her faith-based, original song, Messina released her own version of Cory Asbury's award-winning "Reckless Love" to country and Christian radio.

In the summer of 2023, Messina released another single, "Just To Be Loved," which she wrote based on real-life experiences and inspiration from her teenage son's friends. According to Messina, “The gist of the song is, don’t change who you are just to be loved because God made you perfect. He made you priceless and He already loves you with a perfect love."

Messina continues to spend her time songwriting. “I’ve been writing a lot,” she said. “I’ve been so inspired. Melodies are pouring out of me. Prepare for lots of songs from me. I’m just so thankful, since looking back on my life, it wasn’t pretty. I’m grateful for every day. I grew up so poor and I’ve been so blessed with my career and family — and then there are the fans who come out and who have been so supportive.”

In 2025, Messina increased her presence on social media, engaging fans and followers with comedic content and inspiring daily videos. During this period her social following grew which resulted with an increase in people attending at her live performances.

On March 13, 2026, Messina released the single "Some Bridges," which would also be included in her 2026 album Bridges which marked her 30th anniversary in the country music industry. The project represents a major creative milestone, blending her signature high-energy '90s country-pop production with themes of resilience, faith, and personal wellness.

== Personal life ==
Messina became involved with the Special Olympics after coming across an event while jogging. She has become an ambassador and performs at Special Olympics events to increase attendance.

In 2004, Messina was engaged to road manager Don Muzquiz, but then broke off the engagement. However, the two remained in a business relationship. On June 22, 2007, Messina announced her engagement to businessman Chris Deffenbaugh from New Mexico. They were married in Nashville in late 2007. A son was born January 2009. In January 2012, they welcomed another son.. She divorced Chris Deffenbaugh and later remarried Patrick Wyatt on December 24, 2020.

On September 6, 2017, Messina's team revealed she had been diagnosed with an unspecified cancer. All 2017 tour dates after October 7 were postponed as she underwent treatments in the fall. She resumed touring in March 2018 and continues to add tour dates to her website regularly.

== Discography ==
Studio albums

- 1996: Jo Dee Messina
- 1998: I'm Alright
- 2000: Burn
- 2005: Delicious Surprise
- 2014: Me
- 2026: Bridges

EPs & Other albums

- 2002: A Joyful Noise
- 2003: Greatest Hits
- 2010: Unmistakable: Love
- 2010: Unmistakable: Drive
- 2010: Unmistakable: Inspiration

Singles

- 2016: Noel
- 2018: Bigger Than This
- 2018: Reckless Love
- 2023: Just to Be Loved
- 2026: Some Bridges

== Awards & honors ==
=== Grammy Awards ===
The Grammy Awards are awarded annually by the National Academy of Recording Arts and Sciences. Messina has been nominated twice.

Year	Nominee / Work	Award	Result
2001	"That's The Way"	Best Female Country Vocal Performance	Nominated
2002	"Bring On the Rain" (with Tim McGraw)	Best Country Collaboration with Vocals	Nominated

=== Other awards ===
In addition to her two Grammy Award nominations, Messina has also won an Academy of Country Music Award, a Billboard Magazine Award, three Boston Music Awards, and a Country Music Association Award.

Year	Nominee / work	Award	Result
1998	Academy of Country Music Awards	Top New Female Vocalist	Won
1998	Country Music Association Awards	Horizon Award	Nominated
1998	Country Music Association Awards	Music Video of the Year - "Bye, Bye"	Nominated
1999	Billboard Magazine	Most Played Country Female Artist of the Year	Won
1999	Billboard Magazine	Outstanding Country Act	Won
1999	Billboard Magazine	Outstanding Female Vocalist	Won
1999	Country Music Association Awards	Horizon Award	Won
1999	Country Music Association Awards	Female Vocalist of the Year	Nominated
2000	Country Music Association Awards	Female Vocalist of the Year	Nominated
2002	Country Music Association Awards	Vocal Event of the Year - "Bring On the Rain"	Nominated
2023	Academy of Country Music Awards	Musical Event of the Year - "She Had Me at Heads Carolina"	Nominated
2023	Country Music Association Awards	Musical Event of the Year - "She Had Me at Heads Carolina"	Nominated
