= List of songs written by Jeffrey Steele =

This is an alphabetical list of songs written or co-written by the American songwriter Jeffrey Steele. His credits include several singles mainly recorded by country music artists. Among his compositions are the No. 1 Hot Country Songs hits "Brand New Girlfriend" by Steve Holy, "The Cowboy in Me" by Tim McGraw, "These Days," "What Hurts the Most," "Here" and "My Wish" by Rascal Flatts.

== A ==
- "Adaliene" – Keith Anderson (Keith Anderson, Chris Wallin)
- "Ain't It Just Like a Woman" – Tracy Byrd (Al Anderson)
- "All I Know About Mexico" – Montgomery Gentry (Chris Wallin)
- "All I'm Thinking About Is You" – Billy Ray Cyrus
- "Already in Way Over My Heart" – Stephanie Beaumont (Wendy Waldman)
- "And the Crowd Goes Wild" – Mark Wills, Jeffrey Steele, PBR Allstars (Craig Wiseman)

Am I the only one - with Aaron Lewis

== B ==
- "Back There All the Time" – Drew Davis Band (Steve Robson)
- "Bad Case of Missing You" – Jason Sellers, The Oak Ridge Boys (Al Anderson)
- "Be a Man" – Pam Tillis (Chuck Jones)
- "Big Deal" – LeAnn Rimes (Al Anderson)
- "Bigger Fish to Fry" – Boy Howdy
- "Born That Way" – Boy Howdy (Chris Farren)
- "Brand New Girlfriend" – Steve Holy (Shane Minor, Bart Allmand)
- "Break My Heart" – Keith Anderson (Keith Anderson, Bob DiPiero)
- "Burn" – Drew Davis Band (Bart Allmand)

== C ==
- "Chrome" – Trace Adkins (Anthony Smith)
- "Circles" – Jana Kramer (Alyssa Bonagura, Brandon Hood)
- "Closer" – Mark Wills (Bart Allmand)
- "Clouds" – Montgomery Gentry (Eddie Montgomery, Tony Mullins)
- "Come On, Come On" – Boy Howdy (Paul Marshall)
- "A Cowboy's Born with a Broken Heart" – Boy Howdy (Chris Farren)
- "The Cowboy in Me" – Tim McGraw (Craig Wiseman, Al Anderson)
- "Couldn't Last a Moment" – Collin Raye (Danny Wells)
- "Countrified" – Clay Walker, Halfway to Hazard (Kip Raines)
- "Country Badass" – Cody McCarver (Bart Allmand, Tom Hambridge, Shane Minor)
- "Cry, Cry, Cry" – Trick Pony (Ira Dean)

== E ==
- "Even If It Takes a Lifetime" – Adam Levy (Miles Zunega)
- "Every Day" – Rascal Flatts (Alissa Moreno)
- "Every Little Thing She Does" – Lonestar (Al Anderson, Bob DiPiero)
- "Every Time I Hear Your Name" – Keith Anderson (Keith Anderson, Tom Hambridge)
- "Everywhere I Go" – Phil Vassar (Phil Vassar)

== F ==
- "Flying By" – Billy Ray Cyrus (Joanna Smith, Tom Hambridge)
- "Friend" – Van Zant (Tom Hambridge)

== G ==
- "Give It to Somebody" – Billy Ray Cyrus (Tom Hambridge)
- "Gone" – Montgomery Gentry (Bob DiPiero)

== H ==
- "Half a Man" – Shannon Brown (Kent Blazy)
- "The Hard Way" – Dusty Drake, Tom Waits (Al Anderson, Bob DiPiero)
- "Hell Yeah" – Montgomery Gentry (Craig Wiseman)
- "Hello L.O.V.E." – John Michael Montgomery (Danny Wells)
- "Help Somebody" – Van Zant (Kip Raines)
- "Her" – Aaron Tippin (Craig Wiseman)
- "Here" – Rascal Flatts (Steve Robson)
- "Here I Go Fallin'" – Diamond Rio (Chris Farren)
- "Hey Country" – Victor Sanz, Montgomery Gentry (Bart Allmand, Danny Myrick)
- "Hey Underdog" – Angus Gill & Seasons of Change (Angus Gill, Vicky McGehee, Providence David)
- "Honey Do" – Keith Harling, Mike Walker (Al Anderson, Kent Blazy)
- "How Far Do You Wanna Go?" – Gloriana (Danny Myrick, Matt Serletic)

== I ==
- "I Ain't Hurtin' Nobody but Me" – Keith Anderson (Keith Anderson, Vicky McGehee)
- "I Believed" – Aaron Tippin
- "I Can't Stop You" – Drew Davis Band (Danny Wells)
- "I Hope You Find It" – Cher (Steve Robson)
- "I Keep Coming Back" – Josh Gracin (Steve Robson)
- "I Know My History" – Van Zant (Tom Hambridge, Johnny Van Zant, Donnie Van Zant)
- "I Remember You" – Mountain Heart
- "I Wanna Feel That Way Again" – Boy Howdy (John Hobbs, Chris Farren)
- "I Luv Ya" – Billy Ray Cyrus (Michael Dulaney, John Hobbs)
- "I'll Be Loving You" – Stephanie Beaumont (John Hobbs)
- "I'll Be Right Here Lovin' You" – Rhett Akins, Randy Travis (T.W. Hale)
- "I'll Know When I Get There" – Keith Anderson (Keith Anderson)
- "I'm Tryin'" – Trace Adkins (Anthony Smith, Chris Wallin)
- "I'm Trying to Find It" – Pat Green (Tom Hambridge)
- "If That Ain't Country" – Anthony Smith (Anthony Smith)
- "If This Is Love" – Boy Howdy (Chris Farren)
- "If You Love Somebody" – Kevin Sharp (Chris Farren)
- "Independent Trucker" – Brooks & Dunn (Chris Stapleton)
- "International Harvester" – Craig Morgan (Shane Minor, Danny Myrick)
- "I Thought I Lost You" – Miley Cyrus and John Travolta (Miley Cyrus)
- "It's All About You" – Emerson Drive (Reed Nielsen)
- "It's Only Love" – Jolie & the Wanted (Bekka Bramlett)
- "I've Gotta Know" – Stephanie Beaumont (Rick Crawford)

== K ==
- "Knee Deep" – Zac Brown Band and Jimmy Buffett (Zac Brown, Coy Bowles, Wyatt Durrette)

== L ==
- "Last in a Long Lonesome Line" – Patty Loveless (Al Anderson, Bob DiPiero)
- "Let's Bring It Back" – Lonestar (Annie Roboff)
- "Let's Do Something About It" – Stephanie Beaumont (T.W. Hale)
- "Little Breakdowns" – Carolyn Dawn Johnson (Carolyn Dawn Johnson)
- "Look Me Up" – BR549 (Al Anderson)
- "Love Is a Beautiful Thing" – Paul Brandt (as "It's a Beautiful Thing"), Phil Vassar (Craig Wiseman)
- "Love Make a Fool of Me" – Al Anderson (Al Anderson, Bob DiPiero)
- "A Love That Strong" – Paul Brandt (Reed Nielsen)
- "Love Won't Let Me" – Victor Sanz, Jason Michael Carroll (Steve Robson)

== M ==
- "Me and My Gang" – Rascal Flatts (Tony Mullins, Jon Stone)
- "Meanwhile Back at Mama's" – Tim McGraw (Tom Douglas, Jaren Johnston)
- "Mud" - The Road Hammers (Scott Baggett, Jason McCoy)
- "My Greatest Love" – Stephanie Beaumont with Jeffrey Steele (Chris Farren, John Hobbs)
- "My Life's Work" – Boy Howdy (Chris Farren)
- "My Town" – Montgomery Gentry (Reed Nielsen)
- "My Whiskey Years" – Joe Nichols (Tom Hambridge)
- "My Wish" – Rascal Flatts (Steve Robson)

== N ==
- "Nothing Compares to Loving You" – Aaron Tippin, Michael Peterson (Craig Wiseman)
- "Now" – Lonestar (Steve Robson)

== O ==
- "Once" – Rascal Flatts (John Shanks, Kara DioGuardi)
- "Once a Cowboy" – Trick Pony (Bret Michaels, Shane Minor)
- "The One That Got Away" – Boy Howdy (Walt Aldridge, Chris Farren)
- "One Day" – Drew Davis Band (Craig Wiseman)
- "Our Love Was Meant to Be" – Boy Howdy (Chris Farren)
- "Outta This Town" – Chuck Cannon (Mac Davis, Chuck Cannon)

== P ==
- "Party on the Patio" – Jolie & the Wanted (Craig Wiseman)
- "Plan B" – Boy Howdy (Chris Farren)
- "Please" – Pam Tillis (John Hobbs, Michael Dulaney)
- "Podunk" – Keith Anderson (Keith Anderson, Tom Hambridge)

== R ==
- "Raise 'Em Up" – Keith Urban (Tom Douglas, Jaren Johnston)

== S ==
- "She Can't Love You" – Boy Howdy (Chris Farren, Randy Sharp)
- "She Loved Me" – Montgomery Gentry (Craig Wiseman)
- "She'd Give Anything" – Boy Howdy (Chris Farren, Vince Melamed)
- "She's Gone" – Ricochet (John Hobbs, Michael Dulaney)
- "The Shoebox" – Chris Young (Tom Hambridge)
- "Shotgun Rider" – Tim McGraw (Anthony Smith, Sherrié Austin)
- "Simple Song" – Miley Cyrus (Jesse Littleton)
- "Something in the Water" – Little Feat, Jeffrey Steele (Al Anderson, Bob DiPiero)
- "Something to Be Proud Of" – Montgomery Gentry (Chris Wallin)
- "Something to Brag About" – Tracy Byrd (Al Anderson)
- "Speed" – Montgomery Gentry (Chris Wallin)
- "Stepped Right in It" – Kim Carnes (Al Anderson, Kim Carnes)
- "Stick It" – Keith Anderson (Vicky McGehee, Keith Anderson)
- "Stick That in Your Country Song" – Eric Church
- "The Strength to Love" – Kevin Sharp (Chris Farren, John Hobbs)
- "Sunday Morning and Saturday Night" – James Otto (Tim Nichols)
- "Sunday Morning in America" – Keith Anderson (Keith Anderson, Rivers Rutherford)
- "Sweet Natural Girl" – Emerson Drive (Kip Raines, Craig Wiseman)

== T ==
- "Ten Years of Love" – Gurf Morlix (Gurf Morlix)
- "That Moment" – Drew Davis Band (Steve Robson)
- "That Would Be Her" – Joe Nichols (Reed Nielsen)
- "That's the Kind of Man" – Boy Howdy (Chris Farren)
- "Then I Did" – Rascal Flatts (Steve Robson)
- "These Days" – Rascal Flatts (Steve Robson, Danny Wells)
- "They Don't Make 'Em Like That Anymore" – Boy Howdy (Chris Farren)
- "Things I Miss the Most" – Van Zant (Tom Hambridge, Donnie Van Zant, Johnny Van Zant)
- "'Til the Heartache's Gone" – Diamond Rio (Al Anderson, John Hobbs)
- "Tiny Life" - Danny Gokey (Marv Green)
- "True to His Word" – Boy Howdy (Chris Farren, Gary Harrison)
- "Twenty Years Ago" – Montgomery Gentry (Gary Nicholson, Rivers Rutherford)

== U ==
- "Unbelievable" – Diamond Rio (Al Anderson)

== W ==
- "The Wantin' Not the Gettin'" – Jolie & the Wanted (Al Anderson, Bob DiPiero)
- "Wasted" – Jolie & the Wanted (Al Anderson)
- "We Can Get Through This" – Kevin Sharp (Kim Carnes)
- "We Can't Get Any Higher Than This" – Aaron Tippin (Ray Herndon)
- "We're Makin' Up" – Hot Apple Pie (Al Anderson)
- "Were You Lyin' Down?" – Gurf Morlix (Gurf Morlix)
- "What Am I Waiting For" – Heidi Newfield (Keith Burns, Ira Dean, Heidi Newfield)
- "What Hurts the Most" – Mark Wills, Jo O'Meara, Rascal Flatts, Cascada (Steve Robson), Aaron Lewis
- "What If?" – Emerson Drive (Steve Robson)
- "When the Lights Go Down" – Faith Hill (Craig Wiseman, Rivers Rutherford)
- "Where Fools Are Kings" – Steve Wariner
- "Who Says?" – Stephanie Beaumont (Scott Whitehead)
- "Whoever Said That" – Stephanie Beaumont (Chris Farren, Chuck Jones)
- "Will You Marry Me" – Alabama (Al Anderson)
- "With You" – LeAnn Rimes (Steve Robson)
- "Wouldn't Have To" – Fanny Grace (Paul Reeves)

== Y ==
- "You and Me and Love" – Stephanie Beaumont (Stephanie Beaumont)
- "You're in My Head" – Brian McComas (Shane Minor, Chris Wallin)
- "Your Tears Are Comin'" – Montgomery Gentry (Tom Hambridge)
