= She'd Give Anything =

EP by Boy Howdy
- Released: January 11, 1994
- Recorded: 1993
- Studio: Track Records, Studio Sound Recorders and Uptown West Studios
- Genre: Country
- Length: 22:04
- Label: Curb
- Producer: Chris Farren

Boy Howdy chronology
Welcome to Howdywood (1992)	She'd Give Anything (1994)	Born That Way (1995)

She'd Give Anything is the first EP by American country music band Boy Howdy. It was released in 1994 by Curb Records. It peaked at #19 on the Top Country Albums chart. The EP includes the singles "She'd Give Anything" and "They Don't Make 'em Like That Anymore", which respectively reached #4 and #2 on Billboard Hot Country Singles & Tracks (now Hot Country Songs). Also included is "A Cowboy's Born with a Broken Heart", previously a single from their 1992 debut album Welcome to Howdywood.

== Critical reception ==
Writing for New Country magazine, Brian Mansfield gave the album two stars out of five. He praised the band members for largely writing and performing their own material instead of using outside writers or session musicians, although he found the songs to have "gloss" and lack hooks.

== Track listing ==
No.	Title	Writer(s)	Length
1.	"They Don't Make 'Em Like That Anymore"	Chris Farren, Jeffrey Steele	3:23
2.	"She'd Give Anything"	Farren, Vince Melamed, Steele	3:38
3.	"Homegrown Love"	Skip Ewing, Don Sampson	2:33
4.	"The One That Got Away"	Walt Aldridge, Farren, Steele	3:14
5.	"Come On, Come On"	Paul Marshall, Steele	4:31
6.	"A Cowboy's Born with a Broken Heart"	Farren, Steele	4:45

== Personnel ==
As listed in liner notes

=== Boy Howdy ===
- Cary Park - acoustic guitar, electric guitar, fiddle, mandolin, background vocals
- Larry Park - acoustic guitar, electric guitar, background vocals
- Jeffrey Steele - bass guitar, lead vocals, background vocals
- Hugh Wright - drums, congas, percussion

=== Additional musicians ===
- Chris Farren - acoustic guitar, piano on "A Cowboy's Born with a Broken Heart", background vocals
- John Hobbs - piano
- Jay Dee Maness - steel guitar
- Kevin Nadeau - organ
- Scott Saturday - background vocals

== Chart performance ==
Chart (1994)	Peak position
U.S. Billboard Top Country Albums	19
U.S. Billboard 200	103
U.S. Billboard Top Heatseekers	5
