= Groove On =

Studio album by Gerald Levert
- Released: September 6, 1994
- Studio: Digital Tekniques, Sigma Sound Studios and Studio 4 Recording (Philadelphia, Pennsylvania); Midtown Media Studio (Cincinnati, Ohio); Palace Studios (Shaker Heights, Ohio); Vanguard Studios (Detroit, Michigan); Chartmaker Studios (Malibu, California); Larrabee Sound Studios and Devonshire Sound Studios (North Hollywood, California); Record Plant (Los Angeles, California)
- Genre: R&B; soul
- Length: 61:52
- Label: EastWest
- Producer: Greg Charley; David Foster; Marc Gordon; Gerald Levert; Dwain Mitchell; Edwin "Tony" Nicholas

Gerald Levert chronology
Private Line (1991)	Groove On (1994)	Love & Consequences (1998)

Professional ratings
Review scores
Source	Rating
AllMusic	link
Los Angeles Times	3/4 stars

Groove On is the second studio album by Gerald Levert. It was released by EastWest Records on September 6, 1994, in the United States. The follow-up to Levert's debut album, Private Line (1991), it reached number two on the US Top R&B/Hip-Hop Albums and number 18 on the US Billboard 200. The first single from the album was the David Foster produced "I'd Give Anything", a cover of the 1993 song that was originally recorded by short lived country music group Boy Howdy. It was Levert's second top 40 crossover hit. The music video for the second single "How Many Times" was directed by actress Jada Pinkett. Two more singles included "Can't Help Myself" and "Answering Service".

== Track listing ==
No.	Title	Writer(s)	Producer(s)	Length
1.	"Groove On"	Gerald Levert; Marc Gordon	Levert; Marc G.	4:08
2.	"Rock Me (All Night Long)"	Levert; Edwin "Tony" Nicholas	Levert; Nicholas	5:16
3.	"Let the Juices Flow"	Levert; Nicholas	Levert; Nicholas	4:59
4.	"I'd Give Anything"	Chris Farren; Vince Melamed; Jeffrey Steele	David Foster	4:11
5.	"Answering Service"	Levert; Nicholas	Levert; Nicholas	5:29
6.	"It's Your Turn"	Greg Charley	Charley	4:31
7.	"How Many Times"	Levert; Nicholas	Levert; Nicholas	6:26
8.	"Can't Help Myself"	Levert; Nicholas	Levert; Nicholas	5:23
9.	"Have Mercy"	Levert; Nicholas	Levert; Nicholas	5:21
10.	"Same Place, Same Time"	Levert; Dwain Mitchell; Gerard Labeaud; James Labeaud; Eddie Levert	Levert; Mitchell	4:56
11.	"Nice & Wet"	Levert; Nicholas	Levert; Nicholas	4:46

Bonus track
No.	Title	Writer(s)	Producer(s)	Length
12.	"Love Street"	Levert; Nicholas	Levert; Nicholas	6:16

== Personnel ==
- Gerald Levert – vocals, backing vocals (1–3, 5, 7–12), arrangements (1–3, 5, 7–12), vocal arrangements (1–3, 5, 7–12)
- Marc Gordon – keyboards (1), keyboard programming (1), sequencing (1), drums (1), backing vocals (1), arrangements (1)
- Edwin "Tony" Nicholas – keyboards (2, 3, 5, 7–9, 11, 12), keyboard programming (2, 3, 5, 7–9, 11, 12), sequencing (2, 3, 5, 7–9, 11, 12), drums (2, 3, 5, 7–9, 11, 12), arrangements (2, 3, 5, 7–9, 11, 12)
- Claude Gaudette – synthesizer programming (4)
- Tony Smith – synthesizer programming (4)
- Simon Franglen – Synclavier programming (4)
- Michael Goods – additional keyboards (5, 7, 8), drum programming (5, 7, 8)
- Troy Patterson – additional keyboards (5, 7, 8), drum programming (5, 7, 8)
- Greg Charley – all instruments (6)
- Michael Thompson – guitars (4)
- Randy Bowland – guitars (10)
- Dwain Mitchell – drum programming (10), arrangements (10)
- David Foster – arrangements (4), string arrangements (4)
- William Ross – string arrangements (4)
- Warren Wiebe – backing vocals (4)
- Richard Chatman – backing vocals (5, 10)
- Christopher Kelly – backing vocals (5, 10)
- Gerard LaBeaud – backing vocals (5, 10)
- James LaBeaud – backing vocals (5, 10)
- John Winston – backing vocals (6)

Horns and Strings (Tracks 5, 7, 9 & 12)

- Dennis Williams – conductor
- Glenn Estrin and Richard Swartz – French horn
- Jack Faith – flute (12)
- Larry Gold and Mark Ward – cello
- Walter Pfeil – harp
- Davis Barnett and Ruth Wright – viola
- Larry Abramovitz, Bonnie Ayers, Patricia Brown, Olga Konkpelsky, Helen Kwalwasser, Emma Kummrow, Charles Parker Jr., Jean Perrault, Christine Reeves, Barbara Sonies and Greg Temperman – violin

=== Production ===
- Elizabeth Barrett – art direction, design
- Ruvén Afanador – photography
- Trevel Production Company, Inc. – management, direction

Technical

- Ted Jensen – mastering at Sterling Sound (New York, NY)
- Craig Carruth – recording (1)
- Jim Salamone – recording (1)
- Andy Kravitz – mixing (1)
- Ron Shaffer – recording (2, 3, 10), mixing (3)
- Mike Tarsia – recording (2, 5, 7–12), mixing (2, 5, 7, 9, 11, 12)
- David Reitzas – recording (4)
- Mick Guzauski – mixing (4)
- Arthur Stoppe – recording (5, 7, 9, 12)
- Pete Tokar – recording (5, 7–9, 11)
- Troy Patterson – mixing (5, 7, 8)
- Dwayne Jones – recording (6), assistant mix engineer (6)
- Gerard Smerek – mix engineer (6)
- Greg Charley – mixing (6)
- John Winston – mixing (6)
- Mark Demartini – recording (10)
- Dirk Grobelby – mix assistant (1)
- Gordon Rice – recording assistant (2, 3, 5, 7, 9–12), recording (8), mix assistant (8, 9, 11, 12)
- Paul Smith – recording assistant (2, 3, 10, 12), mix assistant (2, 3, 7, 12)
- Brandon Harris – assistant engineer (4)
- Felipe Elgueta – additional engineer (4)
- Matt Steward – recording assistant (6)
- Paul Hammond – recording assistant (10)

== Charts ==
=== Weekly charts ===
Chart (1994)	Peak position
US Billboard 200	18
US Top R&B/Hip-Hop Albums (Billboard)	2

=== Year-end charts ===
Chart (1994)	Position
US Top R&B/Hip-Hop Albums (Billboard)	40
Chart (1995)	Position
US Billboard 200	199
US Top R&B/Hip-Hop Albums (Billboard)	30

== Certifications ==
Region	Certification	Certified units/sales
United States (RIAA)	Platinum	1,000,000^{^}
^{^} Shipments figures based on certification alone.
