= True to His Word =

Single by Boy Howdy

from the album Born That Way
- B-side: "I'm Already Lovin' You Too Much"
- Released: December 10, 1994
- Genre: Country
- Length: 3:16
- Label: Curb
- Songwriter(s): Jeffrey Steele, Chris Farren, Gary Harrison
- Producer(s): Chris Farren

Boy Howdy singles chronology
| "They Don't Make 'Em Like That Anymore" (1993) | "True to His Word" (1994) | "Bigger Fish to Fry" (1995) |

"True to His Word" is a song recorded by American country music group Boy Howdy. It was released in December 1994 as the first single from the album Born That Way. The song reached #23 on the Billboard Hot Country Singles & Tracks chart. The song was written by the band's lead singer Jeffrey Steele along with Chris Farren and Gary Harrison.

== Chart performance ==
| Chart (1994–1995) | Peak position |
|---|---|
| US Hot Country Songs (Billboard) | 23 |
| Canadian RPM Country Tracks | 24 |
