= Love Is (Kevin Sharp album) =

Studio album by Kevin Sharp
- Released: June 23, 1998
- Genre: Country
- Length: 41:42
- Label: Asylum
- Producers: Chris Farren; David Foster

Kevin Sharp chronology
Measure of a Man (1996)	Love Is (1998)	Make a Wish (2005)

Singles from Love Is
- 1. "If She Only Knew" Released: 1998

Professional ratings
Review scores
Source	Rating
AllMusic	3/5 stars

Love Is is the second studio album by American country music artist Kevin Sharp, released on June 23, 1998 by Asylum Records. The only single released from the album, "If She Only Knew", failed to reach the top 40 in the charts while the album itself reached number 36 on the Billboard Top Country Albums chart. "Her Heart Is Only Human" was originally recorded by Ty Herndon on his 1996 album Living in a Moment.

== Track listing ==
No.	Title	Writer(s)	Length
1.	"Kiss the Girl"	Bob Regan; George Teren	3:04
2.	"We Can Get Through This"	Kim Carnes; Jeffrey Steele	2:55
3.	"If She Only Knew"	Gordon Chambers; Chris Farren	5:00
4.	"She Just Had to Be Mine"	Gary Burr; Farren	3:18
5.	"Still Love"	Kevin Sharp; Skip Ewing; Farren	4:20
6.	"I'm Trying"	Darrell Scott; Tia Sillers	4:01
7.	"Typical"	Regan; Teren	3:15
8.	"What Other Man"	Linda Thompson-Jenner; Reed Vertelney	3:57
9.	"So Tears Won't Fall"	Burr; Bruce Roberts	3:41
10.	"Scared Like That Again"	Farren; Michael Dulaney	4:40
11.	"Her Heart Is Only Human"	Kent Blazy; Steve Dorff; Kim Williams	3:31

== Personnel ==
Credits for Love Is are adapted from the official liner notes.

- Tim Buppert – background vocals
- Mark Casstevens – electric guitar, acoustic guitar
- Joe Chemay – bass guitar
- Dan Dugmore – steel guitar
- Chris Farren – background vocals, acoustic guitar, mandolin, electric guitar, keyboards
- Pat Flynn – acoustic guitar
- Larry Franklin – fiddle
- Paul Franklin – steel guitar
- Rob Hajacos – fiddle
- John Hobbs – piano
- Dann Huff – electric guitar
- David Hungate – bass guitar
- Jeff King – electric guitar
- Mark Leggett – drum programming
- Paul Leim – drums
- Sam Levine – penny whistle
- Glenn Miller – background vocals
- Greg Morrow – percussion
- Steve Nathan – piano
- Cary Park – electric guitar
- Tom Roady – percussion
- Matt Rollings – piano
- Brent Rowan – electric guitar
- Kevin Sharp – lead vocals
- Jeffrey Steele – background vocals
- Biff Watson – acoustic guitar
- Dennis Wilson – background vocals

== Charts ==
Chart (1998)	Peak position
US Top Country Albums (Billboard)	38
