= Measure of a Man (Kevin Sharp album) =

Studio album by Kevin Sharp
- Released: September 24, 1996
- Recorded: 1996
- Studios: The Tracking Room; Emerald Studios, Nashville, TN
- Genre: Country
- Length: 37:10
- Label: Asylum
- Producer: Chris Farren

Kevin Sharp chronology
| Measure of a Man (1996) | Love Is (1998) |

Singles from Measure of a Man
- 1. "Nobody Knows" Released: September 23, 1996; 2. "She's Sure Taking It Well" Released: February 10, 1997; 3. "If You Love Somebody" Released: July 21, 1997; 4. "There's Only You" Released: 1997

Professional ratings
Review scores
| Source | Rating |
|---|---|
| AllMusic | 4/5 stars |

Measure of a Man is the debut studio album by American country music artist Kevin Sharp, released on September 24, 1996 by Asylum Records. The debut single, "Nobody Knows" went to number one on both the American and Canadian country charts. The next two singles, "She's Sure Taking It Well" and "If You Love Somebody" both charted in the top ten while the last single, "There's Only You" failed to reach the top 40. The album has been certified gold by both the RIAA and CRIA. John Batdorf of the 1970s duo Batdorf & Rodney performs background vocals on this album.

== Track listing ==
| No. | Title | Writer(s) | Length |
|---|---|---|---|
| 1. | "Measure of a Man" | Larry Boone; Rick Bowles | 3:07 |
| 2. | "Nobody Knows" | Don DuBose; Joseph Richards | 3:26 |
| 3. | "If You Love Somebody" | Chris Farren; Jeffrey Steele | 2:30 |
| 4. | "There's Only You" | Skip Ewing; Donny Kees | 3:10 |
| 5. | "She's Sure Taking It Well" | Tim Buppert; Don Pfrimmer; George Teren | 3:20 |
| 6. | "The Strength to Love" | Farren; Steele; John Hobbs | 3:21 |
| 7. | "Love Bomb" | Angelo Petraglia; Robert Ellis Orrall | 3:03 |
| 8. | "I'm Already Loving You Too Much" | Farren; Steele; Larry Park | 3:16 |
| 9. | "Population 4000 Minus 1" | Kevin Sharp; Farren | 4:28 |
| 10. | "Somebody's Baby" | Zack Turner; Lonnie Wilson | 3:41 |
| 11. | "Love at the End of the Road" | Annie Tate; Sam Tate | 3:47 |

== Personnel ==
Credits for Measure of a Man are adapted from the official liner notes.

- John Batdorf – background vocals
- Joe Chemay – bass guitar
- David Foster – keyboards
- Chris Farren – background vocals, keyboards, mandolin, nylon string guitar
- Larry Franklin – fiddle
- Paul Franklin – steel guitar
- John Hobbs – keyboards, piano
- Dann Huff – electric guitar
- Paul Leim – drums
- Greg Leisz – lap steel guitar, Dobro
- Greg Mathieson – organ
- Cary Park – electric guitar
- Kevin Sharp – lead vocals, background vocals, handclaps
- Jeffrey Steele – background vocals
- Biff Watson – acoustic guitar
- Scott Wojahn – background vocals

== Charts ==
=== Album ===
| Chart (1996) | Peak position |
|---|---|
| Canadian Albums (RPM) | 79 |
| Canadian Country Albums (RPM) | 2 |
| US Billboard 200 | 40 |
| US Top Country Albums (Billboard) | 4 |
| US Heatseekers Albums (Billboard) | 1 |

=== Singles ===
| Title | Year | Peak chart positions | |
| Title | Year | US Country | CAN Country |
|---|---|---|---|
| "Nobody Knows" | 1996 | 1 | 1 |
| "She's Sure Taking It Well" | 1997 | 3 | 4 |
| "If You Love Somebody" | 1997 | 4 | 7 |
| "There's Only You" | 1997 | 43 | — |
