= Welcome to Howdywood =

Studio album by Boy Howdy
- Released: 1992
- Genre: Country
- Label: Curb
- Producer: Chris Farren

Boy Howdy chronology
Welcome to Howdywood (1992)	She'd Give Anything (1994)

Welcome to Howdywood is the debut studio album by American country music band Boy Howdy. It was released in 1992 via Curb Records. The album includes the singles "Our Love Was Meant to Be" and "A Cowboy's Born with a Broken Heart", which respectively reached Nos. 43 and 12 on Billboard Hot Country Singles & Tracks (now Hot Country Songs).

A review in MusicHound Country: The Essential Album Guide stated that the album "is just about everything that Nashvillians mistrust about Californians singing country and precious little of the things they value...The Park brothers display some impressive chops, but they use them on stuff like a double-time breakdown of The Kinks' 'You Really Got Me'."

== Track listing ==
All songs written by Jeffrey Steele and Chris Farren except where noted.

No.	Title	Writer(s)	Length
1.	"Bring On the Teardrops"	Steele	2:58
2.	"Love Is Easy"		3:01
3.	"If This Is Love"		5:14
4.	"In Another Tear from Now"		3:22
5.	"Thanks for the Ride"	Steele, Farren, Cary Park	3:22
6.	"Justine"		3:04
7.	"If Her Heart Ain't in Memphis"		4:17
8.	"Our Love Was Meant to Be"		3:29
9.	"A Cowboy's Born with a Broken Heart"		4:45
10.	"You Really Got Me"	Ray Davies	3:16

== Personnel ==
- Cary Park – acoustic guitar, electric guitar, mandolin, background vocals
- Larry Park – acoustic guitar, electric guitar, fiddle, background vocals
- Jeffrey Steele – bass guitar, lead vocals
- Hugh Wright – drums, percussion, background vocals
