= Born That Way =

Album by Boy Howdy

Studio album by Boy Howdy
- Released: February 14, 1995
- Genre: Country
- Label: Curb
- Producer: Chris Farren

Boy Howdy chronology
She'd Give Anything (1994)	Born That Way (1995)

Born That Way is the second and final studio album, and third overall album, by the American country music band Boy Howdy. Their final album before disbanding, it was issued in 1995 via Curb Records. It includes the singles "True to His Word", "Bigger Fish to Fry", "She Can't Love You" and "Field of Dreams". Although "True to His Word" peaked at number 23 on the U.S. country charts, the other three singles all missed Top 40.

== Track listing ==
No.	Title	Writer(s)	Length
1.	"Bigger Fish to Fry"	Jeffrey Steele	3:36
2.	"True to His Word"	Steele, Chris Farren, Gary Harrison	3:16
3.	"Born That Way"	Steele, Farren	3:39
4.	"My Life's Work"	Steele, Farren	4:11
5.	"That's the Kind of Man"	Steele, Farren	3:32
6.	"Field of Dreams"	Phil Barnhart, Sam Hogin, Rob Crosby	4:08
7.	"Plan B"	Steele, Farren	3:56
8.	"She Can't Love You"	Steele, Farren, Randy Sharp	3:52
9.	"Love the One You're With"	Stephen Stills	4:09
10.	"I Wanna Feel That Way Again"	Steele, Farren, John Hobbs	3:43

== Personnel ==
=== Boy Howdy ===
- Cary Park – acoustic guitar, electric guitar, mandolin, background vocals
- Larry Park – acoustic guitar, electric guitar, fiddle, background vocals
- Jeffrey Steele – bass guitar, lead vocals
- Hugh Wright – drums, percussion

=== Additional musicians ===
- Larry Corbett, Joel Derouin, Henry Ferber, Armand Garabedian, James Getzoff, Sid Page, Michele Richards, Evan Wilson – strings
- Dan Dugmore – steel guitar
- Chris Farren – acoustic guitar, keyboards, background vocals
- John Hobbs – piano, Hammond B-3 organ
- Paul Leim – drums
- Jay Dee Maness – steel guitar
- Kevin Nadeau – piano

== Chart performance ==
Chart (1995)	Peak position
U.S. Billboard Top Country Albums	73
