= Nobody Knows (Tony Rich song) =

1995 single by Tony Rich

Single by the Tony Rich Project

from the album Words
- Released: November 7, 1995
- Studio: LaCoCo (Atlanta, Georgia)
- Genre: Soul
- Length: 5:06
- Label: LaFace; Arista
- Songwriters: Joe Rich; Don DuBose
- Producer: Tony Rich

The Tony Rich Project singles chronology
"Nobody Knows" (1995)	"Like a Woman" (1996)

Music video
- "Nobody Knows" on YouTube

"Nobody Knows" is a song by American R&B singer Tony Rich (then known as the Tony Rich Project) from his 1996 debut album, Words. It was written by Joe Rich and Don DuBose, and produced by Tony Rich. Released as his debut single on November 7, 1995, by LaFace and Arista Records, the song peaked at number two on both the US Billboard Hot 100 and Billboard Adult Contemporary charts. It also became a hit in several other countries, reaching number one in Ireland, number two in Australia and Canada, and number four in the United Kingdom. Rich received a nomination for the 1997 Grammy Award for Best Male Pop Vocal Performance.

== Critical reception ==
James Hamilton from Music Week's RM Dance Update described the song as a "mushily harmonised US smash crossover smoocher melodically reminiscent of Chairmen of the Board's 'Patches'." In 2026, Billboard magazine ranked "Nobody Knows" number 11 in their list of "The Biggest No. 2 Hot 100 Hits of All Time", noting that the song had peaked at number two, just behind Céline Dion's "Because You Loved Me".

== Track listings ==
- US CD single
1. "Nobody Knows" (album version) – 5:06
2. "Nobody Knows" (Eddie F.'s Untouchable remix) – 6:17
3. "Nobody Knows" (Rich remix) – 5:32
4. "Nobody Knows" (album instrumental) – 5:06
- US cassette single
1. "Nobody Knows" (radio edit)
2. "Nobody Knows" (album instrumental)
- European CD single
1. "Nobody Knows" (album version) – 5:20
2. "Nobody Knows" (album instrumental) – 5:20
- UK and Australian CD single
1. "Nobody Knows" (radio edit) – 4:22
2. "Nobody Knows" (Rich single edit) – 4:22
3. "Nobody Knows" (Untouchable Flava edit) – 4:21
4. "Nobody Knows" (album version) – 5:06
- UK cassette single
1. "Nobody Knows" (radio edit)
2. "Nobody Knows" (Rich single edit)

== Credits and personnel ==
Credits are taken from the US CD single liner notes.

Studios

- Recorded at Studio LaCoCo (Atlanta, Georgia)
- Mixed and mastered at The Hit Factory (New York City)

Personnel

- Joe Rich – writing
- Don DuBose – writing
- Tony Rich – vocals, all instruments except acoustic guitar, production, arrangement
- Peter Moore – acoustic guitar
- Neal H Pogue – recording
- John Frye – recording assistance
- Jon Gass – mixing
- Danny Berniny – mixing assistance
- Herb Powers – mastering
- Antonio M. Reid – executive production
- Davett Singletary – creative direction
- Angela Skouras – art direction
- Daniel Soder – photography
- Derick Procope – stylist
- Barry White – hair stylist and make-up

== Charts ==
=== Weekly charts ===
Chart (1996)	Peak position
Australia (ARIA)	2
Canada Top Singles (RPM)	2
Canada Adult Contemporary (RPM)	2
Europe (Eurochart Hot 100)	15
Europe (European Dance Radio)	2
Germany (GfK)	86
Iceland (Íslenski Listinn Topp 40)	35
Israel (Israeli Singles Chart)	15
Ireland (IRMA)	1
Netherlands (Dutch Top 40)	11
Netherlands (Single Top 100)	13
New Zealand (Recorded Music NZ)	19
Scottish Singles Sales (Official Charts)	4
Sweden (Sverigetopplistan)	15
UK Singles (Official Charts)	4
UK Hip Hop/R&B (Official Charts)	1
US Billboard Hot 100	2
US Adult Contemporary (Billboard)	2
US Adult Top 40 (Billboard)	7
US Hot R&B Singles (Billboard)	11
US Top 40/Mainstream (Billboard)	2
US Top 40/Rhythm-Crossover (Billboard)	1

=== Year-end charts ===
Chart (1996)	Position
Australia (ARIA)	33
Canada Top Singles (RPM)	22
Canada Adult Contemporary (RPM)	15
Netherlands (Dutch Top 40)	50
Netherlands (Single Top 100)	80
Sweden (Topplistan)	85
UK Singles (OCC)	29
UK Airplay (Music Week)	10
US Billboard Hot 100	4
US Adult Contemporary (Billboard)	6
US Adult Top 40 (Billboard)	12
US Hot R&B Singles (Billboard)	30
US Top 40/Mainstream (Billboard)	8
US Top 40/Rhythm-Crossover (Billboard)	7

=== Decade-end charts ===
Chart (1990–1999)	Position
US Billboard Hot 100	61

=== All-time charts ===
Chart (1958–2018)	Position
US Billboard Hot 100	136

== Certifications ==
Region	Certification	Certified units/sales
Australia (ARIA)	Gold	35,000^{^}
United Kingdom (BPI)	Silver	200,000^{^}
United States (RIAA)	Platinum	1,300,000
^{^} Shipments figures based on certification alone.

== Release history ==
Region	Date	Format(s)	Label(s)	Ref.
United States	November 7, 1995	CD; cassette	LaFace; Arista	
United States	December 5, 1995	Rhythmic contemporary; contemporary hit radio	LaFace; Arista	
United Kingdom	April 22, 1996	CD; cassette	LaFace; Arista	

== Kevin Sharp version ==
"Nobody Knows"

Single by Kevin Sharp

from the album Measure of a Man
- Released: September 23, 1996
- Genre: Country
- Length: 3:26
- Label: Asylum
- Songwriters: Joe Rich; Don DuBose
- Producer: Chris Farren

Kevin Sharp singles chronology
"Nobody Knows" (1996)	"She's Sure Taking It Well" (1997)

American country music artist Kevin Sharp recorded a cover version of the song on his 1996 debut album, Measure of a Man. It was released on September 23, 1996, as his debut single. It became his only number-one single on the Billboard Hot Country Singles & Tracks chart, spending four weeks on the chart.

=== Critical reception ===
Deborah Evans Price of Billboard magazine reviewed the song favorably, saying that his "smooth, melodic voice and sensitive interpretation of the lyric signal show promise for this talented new artist."

=== Music video ===
The music video was directed by Jeffrey Phillips and premiered in late 1996.

=== Charts ===
==== Weekly charts ====
Chart (1997)	Peak position
Canada Country Singles (RPM)	1
US Hot Country Singles & Tracks (Billboard)	1

==== Year-end charts ====
Chart (1997)	Position
Canada Country Tracks (RPM)	22
US Hot Country Singles & Tracks (Billboard)	51

== Other versions ==
In 1997, saxophonist Richard Elliot covered the song from his album Jumpin' Off. Eli Mattson delivered a piano/vocal cover on the third season of America's Got Talent in 2008. British boyband JLS also recorded a cover of the song; it was leaked onto the internet in June 2010 and has now appeared as the B-side to their single She Makes Me Wanna. British pop singer Shayne Ward included a cover on his third album, Obsession. The song is featured on the Boyzone album, BZ20, released in November 2013.
