= Get Right with the Man =

Studio album by Van Zant
- Released: May 10, 2005
- Recorded: 2004–5 at The Sound Kitchen - Franklin, TN
- Genre: Country
- Length: 40:09
- Label: Columbia
- Producer: Joe Scaife, Mark Wright

Van Zant chronology
Van Zant II (2001)	Get Right with the Man (2005)	My Kind of Country (2007)

Singles from Get Right with the Man
- 1. "Help Somebody" Released: March 7, 2005; 2. "Nobody Gonna Tell Me What to Do" Released: September 19, 2005; 3. "Things I Miss the Most" Released: April 10, 2006

Professional ratings
Review scores
Source	Rating
Allmusic	3.5/5 stars

Get Right with the Man is the fourth studio album by American musical duo Van Zant. It was released in 2005 by Columbia Records. It peaked at number 2 on the Top Country Albums chart, and was certified Gold by the RIAA. The album includes the singles "Help Somebody", "Nobody Gonna Tell Me What to Do" and "Things I Miss the Most". The song "I'm Doin' Alright", was featured in the 2006 EA Sports game NASCAR 07.

This album has been released with the Copy Control protection system in some regions.

== Track listing ==
No.	Title	Writer(s)	Length
1.	"Takin' Up Space"	Bobby Pinson, Billy Joe Walker Jr.	2:45
2.	"Nobody Gonna Tell Me What to Do"	Tony Mullins, Tim Nichols, Craig Wiseman	3:28
3.	"Sweet Mama"	Tom Hambridge, Robert White Johnson, Donnie Van Zant	3:32
4.	"Help Somebody"	Kip Raines, Jeffrey Steele	4:13
5.	"Things I Miss the Most"	Hambridge, Steele, D. Van Zant, Johnny Van Zant	3:53
6.	"I Know My History"	Hambridge, Steele, D. Van Zant, J. Van Zant	3:04
7.	"I Can't Help Myself"	D. Van Zant, J. Van Zant, Brad Warren, Brett Warren	4:09
8.	"I'm Doin' Alright"	Rivers Rutherford, D. Van Zant, J. Van Zant	3:17
9.	"Lovin' You"	Al Anderson, Rutherford	4:01
10.	"Plain Jane"	Johnson, Michael Lunn, D. Van Zant, J. Van Zant	3:28
11.	"Been There Done That"	Blair Daly, D. Van Zant, J. Van Zant	4:19

== Personnel ==
Taken from liner notes.

Van Zant

- Johnny Van Zant – lead vocals, background vocals
- Donnie Van Zant – lead vocals, background vocals

Additional Musicians

- Bekka Bramlett – background vocals
- Tom Bukovac – electric guitar
- Perry Coleman – background vocals
- Eric Darken – percussion
- Glen Duncan – fiddle
- Kenny Greenberg – electric guitar
- Greg Morrow – drums, percussion
- Russ Pahl – lap steel guitar, steel guitar, banjo
- Michael Rhodes – bass guitar
- Jeffrey Steele – background vocals
- Trez – background vocals
- John Willis – acoustic guitar
- Glenn Worf – bass guitar
- Reese Wynans – B3 organ, keyboards, piano, Wurlitzer

== Chart performance ==
=== Weekly charts ===
Chart (2005)	Peak position
US Billboard 200	21
US Top Country Albums (Billboard)	2

=== Year-end charts ===
Chart (2005)	Position
US Top Country Albums (Billboard)	38
Chart (2006)	Position
US Top Country Albums (Billboard)	68

=== Singles ===
Year	Single	Peak chart positions	
Year	Single	US Country	US
2005	"Help Somebody"	8	66
2005	"Nobody Gonna Tell Me What to Do"	16	111
2006	"Things I Miss the Most"	59	—
"—" denotes releases that did not chart

== Certifications ==
Region	Certification
United States (RIAA)	Gold
