= Podunk (song) =

Single by Keith Anderson

from the album Three Chord Country and American Rock & Roll
- Released: September 25, 2006
- Genre: Country
- Length: 3:59
- Label: Arista Nashville
- Songwriters: Keith Anderson, Jeffrey Steele, Tom Hambridge
- Producer: Jeffrey Steele

Keith Anderson singles chronology
"Three Chord Country and American Rock & Roll" (2006)	"Podunk" (2006)	"Sunday Morning in America" (2007)

"Podunk" is a song co-written and recorded by American country music artist Keith Anderson. It was released in September 2006 as the fifth and final single from his debut album Three Chord Country and American Rock & Roll. The song reached number 34 on the US Billboard Hot Country Songs chart. Anderson wrote this song with Jeffrey Steele and Tom Hambridge.

== Chart performance ==
Chart (2006)	Peak position
US Hot Country Songs (Billboard)	34
