= Sunday Morning in America =

Single by Keith Anderson

from the album C'mon!
- Released: May 7, 2007
- Genre: Country
- Length: 4:51
- Label: Columbia Nashville
- Songwriters: Keith Anderson, Rivers Rutherford, Jeffrey Steele
- Producer: Jeffrey Steele

Keith Anderson singles chronology
"Podunk" (2006)	"Sunday Morning in America" (2007)	"I Still Miss You" (2008)

"Sunday Morning in America" is a song co-written and recorded by American country music artist Keith Anderson. It was released in May 2007 as the lead single from his album C'mon!. Anderson wrote this song with Jeffrey Steele and Rivers Rutherford.

== Content ==
The song is an uptempo, in which the narrator describes an average Sunday morning in America. He imagines what the morning is like for everybody from a mother who takes the Lord's name in vain while looking for a church parking space, to a homeless man being ignored by the joggers that run by him.

== Critical reception ==
Kevin John Coyne of Country Universe gave the song a B+ grade, saying that it has two different outlooks based on two different songs, "That's What I Love About Sunday" by Craig Morgan and "Sunday Morning Coming Down" by Johnny Cash. He goes on to say it's "patriotic without being pandering, and captures a wide swath of the American experience." Michael Sudhalter of Country Standard Time in his review of the album, said that the song "represents a cross section of American life on its day of rest."

== Chart performance ==
"Sunday Morning in America" debuted at number 55 on the Billboard Hot Country Songs charts for the week of May 26, 2007.

Chart (2007)	Peak position
US Hot Country Songs (Billboard)	28
