= My Kind of Country (Van Zant album) =

Studio album by Van Zant
- Released: October 9, 2007
- Genre: Country
- Length: 42:27
- Label: Columbia
- Producer: Justin Niebank, Mark Wright

Van Zant chronology
| Get Right with the Man (2005) | My Kind of Country (2007) |

Singles from My Kind of Country
- 1. "That Scares Me" Released: 2007; 2. "Goes Down Easy" Released: 2007

Professional ratings
Review scores
| Source | Rating |
|---|---|
| AllMusic | 3/5 stars |

My Kind of Country is the fifth and final studio album released by American musical duo Van Zant. It was released in 2007 by Columbia Records. It peaked at number 10 on the Top Country Albums chart. The album includes the singles "That Scares Me" and "Goes Down Easy", both of which charted on Billboard Hot Country Songs.

== Track listing ==
| No. | Title | Writer(s) | Length |
|---|---|---|---|
| 1. | "Train" | Tony Mullins, Donnie Van Zant, Johnny Van Zant, Craig Wiseman | 3:55 |
| 2. | "These Colors Don't Run" | Mullins, D. Van Zant, J. Van Zant | 4:23 |
| 3. | "Goes Down Easy" | Tom Hambridge, David Lee Murphy, Gary Nicholson | 3:41 |
| 4. | "That Scares Me" | Ashley Gorley, Rivers Rutherford, George Teren | 3:25 |
| 5. | "My Kind of Country" | Blair Daly, Hambridge, D. Van Zant, J. Van Zant | 3:21 |
| 6. | "The Hardest Thing" | Daryl Burgess, Thom McHugh | 4:02 |
| 7. | "It's Only Money" | Murphy, Anthony Smith | 3:20 |
| 8. | "We Can't Do It Alone" | Brett James, D. Van Zant, J. Van Zant | 4:22 |
| 9. | "Friend" | Hambridge, Jeffrey Steele | 3:52 |
| 10. | "It's All About You" | Bob DiPiero, D. Van Zant, J. Van Zant | 3:59 |
| 11. | "Headed South" | D. Van Zant, J. Van Zant, Brad Warren, Brett Warren | 4:07 |

== Personnel ==
Van Zant

- Donnie Van Zant – lead vocals, background vocals
- Johnny Van Zant – lead vocals, background vocals

Additional musicians

- Robert Bailey – background vocals
- Pat Buchanan – electric guitar, harmonica
- Tom Bukovac – electric guitar
- Bobby Capps – keyboards
- Perry Coleman – background vocals
- Eric Darken – percussion
- Stuart Duncan – fiddle
- Kim Fleming – background vocals
- Larry Franklin – fiddle
- Kenny Greenberg – electric guitar
- Vicki Hampton – background vocals
- Matt Hauer – electric guitar
- Garry Hensley – bass guitar
- Noah Hungerford – drums
- Erik Lundgren – bass guitar
- Marc Miller – pedal steel guitar
- Greg Morrow – drums, percussion
- Russ Pahl – banjo, dobro, pedal steel guitar
- Michael Rhodes – bass guitar
- Crystal Taliefero – background vocals
- Russell Terrell – background vocals
- John Willis – acoustic guitar

== Chart performance ==
=== Album ===
| Chart (2007) | Peak position |
|---|---|
| U.S. Billboard Top Country Albums | 10 |
| U.S. Billboard 200 | 57 |

=== Singles ===
| Year | Single | Peak chart positions |
| Year | Single | US Country |
|---|---|---|
| 2007 | "That Scares Me" | 50 |
| 2007 | "Goes Down Easy" | 45 |
