= I Still Miss You =

Single by Keith Anderson

from the album C'mon!
- Released: January 28, 2008
- Genre: Country
- Length: 3:55
- Label: Columbia Nashville
- Songwriters: Keith Anderson; Tim Nichols; Jason Sellers
- Producer: Jeffrey Steele

Keith Anderson singles chronology
"Sunday Morning in America" (2007)	"I Still Miss You" (2008)	"Somebody Needs a Hug" (2008)

"I Still Miss You" is a song co-written and recorded by American country music singer Keith Anderson. It was released in January 2008 as the second single from his album C'mon!, which was released on August 5, 2008. In addition, it is the fastest-rising single of his career, and his highest peaking chart entry, reaching number 2 on the Hot Country Songs charts. The song was written by Anderson, Jason Sellers and Tim Nichols.

== Content ==
The song is a mid-tempo in which the narrator tells of how he, despite his attempts to get on with his life, still misses an unnamed person in his life. According to Anderson, the song is intentionally open-ended in regards to whom the narrator is missing: "Some people have attached their own meaning to it by other losses in their lives—losing a loved one, families being split up."

== Music video ==
A music video was filmed for the video in May 2008. It features Anderson performing the song at a piano in a black room, wearing all black. Scenes of him sitting on a throne in a blue room are interspersed. The black room also contains several faded pictures, some of which start out as a live scenario and are print-made to the surface, to make it look like an x-ray. The video makes heavy use of black ink, even ending with a splatter of black ink scrolling across the screen, instead of the usual fade-out or sharp cut. The music video was directed by Traci Goudie. The video was dedicated to Anderson's mother, who died of breast cancer the year the song came out.

== Chart performance ==
"I Still Miss You" debuted at number 44 on the Hot Country Songs chart dated February 16, 2008. On the chart week of September 6, 2008, it became his highest-charting country single, reaching a peak of number 2, behind only "You Look Good in My Shirt" by Keith Urban.

Chart (2008)	Peak position
Canada Country (Billboard)	9
Canada Hot 100 (Billboard)	95
US Hot Country Songs (Billboard)	2
US Billboard Hot 100	48

=== Year-end charts ===
Chart (2008)	Position
US Country Songs (Billboard)	8
