= She's Sure Taking It Well =

Single by Kevin Sharp

from the album Measure of a Man
- Released: February 10, 1997
- Genre: Country
- Length: 3:20
- Label: Asylum
- Songwriters: Tim Buppert; Don Pfrimmer; George Teren
- Producer: Chris Farren

Kevin Sharp singles chronology
"Nobody Knows" (1996)	"She's Sure Taking It Well" (1997)	"If You Love Somebody" (1997)

"She's Sure Taking It Well" is a song recorded by American country music artist Kevin Sharp. It was released on February 10, 1997 as the second single from his debut album, Measure of a Man. The song reached number 3 on the Billboard Hot Country Singles & Tracks chart in June 1997. It was written by Tim Buppert, Don Pfrimmer and George Teren.

== Music video ==
The music video was directed by Norry Niven and premiered in early 1997. It went to the top of CMT charts and made Hot Video #1.

== Charts ==
The song debuted at number 75 on the US Billboard Hot Country Songs for the week of February 8, 1997.

=== Weekly charts ===
Chart (1997)	Peak position
Canada Country Singles (RPM)	4
US Hot Country Songs (Billboard)	3

=== Year-end charts ===
Chart (1997)	Position
Canada Country Tracks (RPM)	52
US Hot Country Songs (Billboard)	25
