= XXL (Keith Anderson song) =

Single by Keith Anderson

from the album Three Chord Country and American Rock & Roll
- Released: July 30, 2005
- Genre: Country
- Length: 3:44
- Label: Arista Nashville
- Songwriter(s): Bob DiPiero; Keith Anderson
- Producer(s): Jeffrey Steele

Keith Anderson singles chronology
"Pickin' Wildflowers" (2005)	"XXL" (2005)	"Every Time I Hear Your Name" (2006)

"XXL" is a song co-written and recorded by American country music artist Keith Anderson. It was released in July 2005 as the second single from the album Three Chord Country and American Rock & Roll. The song reached #23 on the Billboard Hot Country Songs chart. The song was written by Anderson and Bob DiPiero.

== Music video ==
A video for the song was made and features a cameo from Mötley Crüe drummer Tommy Lee, along with former NFL running back Eddie George.

== Chart performance ==
Chart (2005)	Peak position
US Bubbling Under Hot 100 Singles (Billboard)	22
US Hot Country Songs (Billboard)	23
