= Pickin' Wildflowers =

Single by Keith Anderson

from the album Three Chord Country and American Rock & Roll
- Released: December 6, 2004
- Genre: Country
- Length: 3:05
- Label: Arista Nashville
- Songwriters: John Rich; Kim Williams; Keith Anderson
- Producer: Jeffrey Steele

Keith Anderson singles chronology
"Pickin' Wildflowers" (2004)	"XXL" (2005)

"Pickin' Wildflowers" is a song co-written and recorded by American country music artist Keith Anderson. It was released in December 2004 as his debut single and the first from his debut album Three Chord Country and American Rock & Roll. It peaked at number 8 on the Hot Country Songs chart, number 64 on the Billboard Hot 100, and number 82 on the Pop 100. Anderson wrote the song with John Rich and Kim Williams.

== Music video ==
The music video was directed by Eric Welch and premiered on February 3, 2005. It features Anderson singing the song in a crowded bar with a full band, as well as him trying to seduce a girl to go out with him...which they do, leading to sex in a car, in a smoky hallway, and on a truck bed. Back in the bar, other patrons are also seen dirty dancing, grouping each other and making out. It ends with a quick shot of the bar doorman's face (who is seen briefly in the video's opening welcoming patrons) giving a grimacing look to the camera.

The music video reached number 1 on CMT's Top Twenty Countdown for the week of July 14, 2005.

A couple who was in the video said the choreographer wanted them to do freestyle dancing but keep it "juke joint".

== Chart positions ==
"Pickin' Wildflowers" debuted at number 47 on the U.S. Billboard Hot Country Singles & Tracks for the week of December 25, 2004.

Chart (2004–2005)	Peak position
Canada Country (Radio & Records)	14
US Hot Country Songs (Billboard)	8
US Billboard Hot 100	64
US Billboard Pop 100	82

=== Year-end charts ===
Chart (2005)	Position
US Country Songs (Billboard)	51
