= They Don't Make 'Em Like That Anymore =

Single by Boy Howdy

from the EP She'd Give Anything
- Released: March 21, 1994
- Genre: Country
- Length: 3:23
- Label: Curb
- Songwriters: Chris Farren; Jeffrey Steele
- Producer: Chris Farren

Boy Howdy singles chronology
"She'd Give Anything" (1994)	"They Don't Make 'Em Like That Anymore" (1994)	"True to His Word" (1995)

"They Don't Make 'Em Like That Anymore" is a song written by Chris Farren and Jeffrey Steele, and recorded by American country music group Boy Howdy. It was released in March 1994 as the second single from their EP She'd Give Anything. The song reached No. 2 on the Billboard Hot Country Singles & Tracks chart in July of that year.

== Chart positions ==
"They Don't Make 'Em Like That Anymore" debuted at number 60 on the U.S. Billboard Hot Country Singles & Tracks for the week of April 2, 1994

Chart (1994)	Peak position
Canada Country Singles (RPM)	3
US Hot Country Songs (Billboard)	2

=== Year-end charts ===
Chart (1994)	Position
Canada Country Tracks (RPM)	94
US Country Songs (Billboard)	27
