= C'mon! (Keith Anderson album) =

Studio album by Keith Anderson
- Released: August 5, 2008
- Recorded: The Tracking Room & The Tin Ear, Nashville, TN
- Genre: Country
- Length: 43:08
- Label: Columbia Nashville
- Producer: Jeffrey Steele

Keith Anderson chronology
Three Chord Country and American Rock & Roll (2005)	C'mon! (2008)	I'll Bring the Music (2015)

Singles from C'mon!
- 1. "Sunday Morning in America" Released: May 7, 2007; 2. "I Still Miss You" Released: January 28, 2008; 3. "Somebody Needs a Hug" Released: October 13, 2008; 4. "She Could've Been Mine" Released: January 20, 2009

Professional ratings
Review scores
Source	Rating
Allmusic	2.5/5 stars
Country Standard Time	

C'mon! is the second studio album by American country music artist Keith Anderson. The album was released by Columbia Nashville on August 5, 2008. It features the singles "Sunday Morning in America" and "I Still Miss You," the latter of which reached the Top 5 on the Billboard Hot Country Songs chart in August 2008. The third single "Somebody Needs A Hug" failed to reach top 40, peaking at #46. His next single "She Could've Been Mine" was released in January 2009, and it was even less successful, peaking at No. 56. Ten of the album's eleven songs were co-written by Anderson.

Radney Foster and Bill Lloyd, who comprised the 1980s duo Foster & Lloyd, appear on the track "Crazy Over You." The song is a cover of their debut single from 1987, which was a Top 5 country hit that year. "Lost in This Moment," co-written by Anderson, was a Number One single for the duo Big & Rich in 2007.

== Track listing ==
No.	Title	Writer(s)	Length
1.	"C'mon!"	Keith Anderson, Dallas Davidson	3:33
2.	"Break My Heart"	Anderson, Bob DiPiero, Jeffrey Steele	3:46
3.	"Somebody Needs a Hug"	Anderson, DiPiero, David Lee Murphy	4:06
4.	"She Could've Been Mine"	Anderson, Chuck Cannon	4:04
5.	"Sunday Morning in America"	Anderson, Rivers Rutherford, Steele	4:51
6.	"I Still Miss You"	Anderson, Tim Nichols, Jason Sellers	3:55
7.	"Crazy Over You" (featuring Foster & Lloyd)	Radney Foster, Bill Lloyd	3:26
8.	"I Ain't Hurtin' Nobody But Me"	Anderson, Vicky McGehee, Steele	3:24
9.	"Adaliene"	Anderson, Steele, Chris Wallin	3:45
10.	"Lost in This Moment"	Anderson, Rodney Clawson, John Rich	4:33
11.	"Closest I've Ever Been"	Anderson, Bobby Pinson	3:45

== Personnel ==
- Keith Anderson - lead vocals, acoustic guitar
- Larry Beaird - acoustic guitar
- Pat Buchanan - electric guitar
- Tom Bukovac - electric guitar
- Eric Darken - percussion
- Joanna Cotten - background vocals
- David Lee Murphy - background vocals
- Kenny Greenberg - electric guitar
- Tony Harrell - piano
- Bob Hatter - talkbox guitar, background vocals
- Steve Hinson - lap steel guitar, pedal steel guitar
- Mike Johnson - pedal steel guitar
- Troy Lancaster - electric guitar
- Chris McHugh - drums
- Chip Matthews - Ebow, acoustic guitar, background vocals
- Greg Morrow - drums
- Danny Myrick - background vocals
- Russ Pahl - pedal steel guitar
- Bobby Pinson - acoustic guitar
- Michael Rhodes - bass guitar
- Phil "Pretty Boy" Sanders - background vocals
- Jeffrey Steele - background vocals
- Glenn Worf - bass guitar

== Chart performance ==
=== Weekly charts ===
Chart (2008)	Peak position
US Billboard 200	12
US Top Country Albums (Billboard)	3

=== Year-end charts ===
Chart (2008)	Position
US Top Country Albums (Billboard)	74

=== Singles ===
Year	Single	Peak chart positions		
Year	Single	US Country	US	CAN
2007	"Sunday Morning in America"	28	—	—
2008	"I Still Miss You"	2	48	95
2008	"Somebody Needs a Hug"	46	—	—
2009	"She Could've Been Mine"	56	—	—

== See also ==
- 2008 in music
