= Van Zant II =

Studio album by Van Zant
- Released: March 6, 2001
- Recorded: 2000
- Studio: The Sound Kitchen, Franklin, TN
- Genre: Country
- Length: 43:33
- Label: Sanctuary
- Producer: Robert White Johnson

Van Zant chronology
| Brother to Brother (1998) | Van Zant II (2001) | Get Right with the Man (2005) |

Professional ratings
Review scores
| Source | Rating |
|---|---|
| Allmusic | 3.5/5 stars |
| Rock Hard | 6/10 |

Van Zant II is an album released by American musical duo Van Zant. It was released in 2001 by Sanctuary Records. The single "Get What You Got Comin'" achieved chart success.

This album has been released with the Copy Control protection system in some regions.

== Track listing ==
1. "Oklahoma" (Chris Pelcer, Donnie Van Zant, Robert White Johnson) - 5:27
2. "Get What You Got Comin'" - 4:15
3. "Heart Of An Angel" (Pelcer, Donnie Van Zant, Johnson) - 4:03
4. "Is It For Real" (Donnie Van Zant, Jerry McPherson, Johnson) - 3:54
5. "Imagination" - 4:43
6. "At Least I'm Free" - 4:55
7. "Baby Get Blue" - 4:24
8. "What's The World Coming To" (Pelcer, Donnie Van Zant, Johnson) - 3:57
9. "Wildside" - 4:06
10. "Alive" (Donnie Van Zant, Jim Peterik, Johnny Van Zant) - 5:09

All songs written by Chris Pelcer, Donnie Van Zant, Johnny Van Zant and Robert White Johnson except where noted.

== Personnel ==
Van Zant

- Donnie Van Zant - lead vocals, background vocals
- Johnny Van Zant - lead vocals, background vocals

Additional Musicians

- Pat Buchanan - guitar
- Shane Fontayne - electric guitar
- Jerry McPherson - acoustic guitar, electric guitar
- Mike Brignardello - bass guitar
- Tony Morra - drums
- Bill Cuomo - Hammond organ, piano
- Chris Carmichael - strings
- Jimmy Nichols - strings
- Robert White Johnson - percussion, background vocals
- Carol Chase - background vocals
- Gary Dales - background vocals
- Janelle Guillot - voice over
- Vicki Hampton - background vocals
- Michael O'Hara - background vocals
- Dale Rossington - background vocals
- Kenny Wayne Shepherd - electric guitar on "Get What You Got Comin'" and "At Least I'm Free"

Technical

- Ben Fowler, Gary Dales, Peter Beckerman - recording engineers
- Robert White Johnson - mixing
- Gary Dales - mixing
- Bob Ludwig - mastering
- Ioannis Vasilopoulos - artwork
- Alan Chappell - design
