= Three Chord Country and American Rock & Roll =

Studio album by Keith Anderson
- Released: May 3, 2005
- Genre: Country
- Length: 44:43
- Label: Arista Nashville
- Producers: John Rich; Jeffrey Steele

Keith Anderson chronology
Three Chord Country and American Rock & Roll (2005)	C'mon! (2008)

Singles from Three Chord Country and American Rock & Roll
- 1. "Pickin' Wildflowers" Released: December 6, 2004; 2. "XXL" Released: August 1, 2005; 3. "Every Time I Hear Your Name" Released: January 16, 2006; 4. "Three Chord Country and American Rock & Roll" Released: July 10, 2006; 5. "Podunk" Released: September 25, 2006

Professional ratings
Review scores
Source	Rating
AllMusic	1/5 stars
Country Standard Time	

Three Chord Country and American Rock & Roll is the debut studio album by American country music artist Keith Anderson. It features the singles "Pickin' Wildflowers", "XXL", "Every Time I Hear Your Name", and "Podunk", all of which charted in the Top 40 on the Billboard Hot Country Songs charts. A remixed version of the title track, featuring Steven Tyler of the rock band Aerosmith, was to have been released as the album's fourth single (following "Every Time I Hear Your Name"), but this single mix was withdrawn before it could chart, and replaced with "Podunk" as the fourth single. The album has been certified gold in the United States by the RIAA. Jeffrey Steele produced the album except for the title track, which was produced by John Rich of Big & Rich.

== Track listing ==
No.	Title	Writer(s)	Length
1.	"Three Chord Country and American Rock & Roll"	Keith Anderson, John Rich	4:13
2.	"Podunk"	Anderson, Jeffrey Steele, Tom Hambridge	3:59
3.	"Wrap Around"	Anderson, Rich, Kim Williams	3:49
4.	"XXL"	Anderson, Bob DiPiero	3:44
5.	"Pickin' Wildflowers"	Anderson, Rich, Williams	3:05
6.	"Every Time I Hear Your Name"	Anderson, Steele, Hambridge	4:23
7.	"Stick It"	Anderson, Steele, Vicky McGehee	4:16
8.	"Plan B"	Anderson, Craig Wiseman	4:28
9.	"Lazy with Your Love"	Anderson, Joni Wilson	4:01
10.	"The Clothes Don't Make the Man"	Anderson, Arlis Albritton	4:19
11.	"I'll Know When I Get There"	Anderson, Steele	4:26

== Chart performance ==
=== Weekly charts ===
Chart (2005)	Peak position
US Billboard 200	71
US Top Country Albums (Billboard)	12

=== Year-end charts ===
Chart (2005)	Position
US Top Country Albums (Billboard)	51
Chart (2006)	Position
US Top Country Albums (Billboard)	57

=== Singles ===
Year	Single	Peak chart positions			Certifications (sales threshold)
Year	Single	US Country	US	US Pop	Certifications (sales threshold)
2004	"Pickin' Wildflowers"	8	64	82	US: Gold
2005	"XXL"	23	122	—	
2006	"Every Time I Hear Your Name"	7	64	97	
2006	"Three Chord Country and American Rock & Roll"	—	—	—	
2006	"Podunk"	34	—	—	
"—" denotes releases that did not chart

== Certifications ==
Region	Certification
United States (RIAA)	Gold

== Personnel ==
- Keith Anderson – lead vocals, background vocals, "raving mad girlfriend on cell phone on 'Stick It'"
- Brian Barnett – drums
- Tom Bukovac – electric guitar
- Chad Cromwell – drums
- Eric Darken – percussion, lap steel guitar
- Tom Hambridge – background vocals
- Tony Harrell – piano, Hammond organ, Wurlitzer, synthesizer strings
- Bob Hatter – background vocals, talk box guitar
- Mike Johnson – pedal steel guitar
- Jerry Jones – electric guitar
- Steve Mackey – bass guitar
- Chip Matthews – background vocals
- Vicky McGehee – background vocals
- Chris McHugh – drums
- Greg Morrow – drums
- Danny Myrick – background vocals
- Russ Pahl – banjo, "wonk-a-wonk guitar", pedal steel guitar, lap steel guitar, Jew's harp
- Ethan Pilzer – bass guitar
- Kip Raines – background vocals
- Michael Rhodes – bass guitar
- John Rich – background vocals
- Michael Rojas – piano, Hammond organ, keyboards
- Phillip Sanders – acoustic guitar
- Adam Shoenfeld – electric guitar
- Steven Sheehan – acoustic guitar
- Jeffrey Steele – background vocals
- 3 Ring Circus Singers – background vocals
- John Willis – acoustic guitar, electric guitar, National steel guitar
- Jonathan Yudkin – fiddle, percussion, strings
