= If You Love Somebody =

Single by Kevin Sharp

from the album Measure of a Man
- Released: July 21, 1997
- Genre: Country
- Length: 2:30
- Label: Asylum
- Songwriters: Chris Farren; Jeffrey Steele
- Producer: Chris Farren

Kevin Sharp singles chronology
| "She's Sure Taking It Well" (1997) | "If You Love Somebody" (1997) | "There's Only You" (1998) |

"If You Love Somebody" is a song written by Chris Farren and Jeffrey Steele, and recorded by American country music artist Kevin Sharp. It was released on July 21, 1997 as the third single from his debut album, Measure of a Man. The song reached number 4 on the Billboard Hot Country Singles & Tracks chart in October 1997.

== Critical reception ==
Deborah Evans Price, of Billboard magazine reviewed the song favorably, saying that the record grabs the listener immediately and doesn't let go thanks to the "energetic percussion that opens this track and gives way to a spree of sassy fiddle lines." She goes on to say that the song is a fine example of the "vibrancy and passion he can bring to a great uptempo cut."

== Charts ==
The song debuted at number 65 on the US Billboard Hot Country Songs for the week of July 26, 1997.

=== Weekly charts ===
| Chart (1997) | Peak position |
|---|---|
| Canada Country Singles (RPM) | 7 |
| US Hot Country Songs (Billboard) | 4 |

=== Year-end charts ===
| Chart (1997) | Position |
|---|---|
| Canada Country Tracks (RPM) | 94 |
| US Hot Country Songs (Billboard) | 50 |
