= Nobody Gonna Tell Me What to Do =

Single by Van Zant

from the album Get Right with the Man
- Released: September 19, 2005
- Genre: Country
- Length: 3:28
- Label: Columbia
- Songwriters: Tony Mullins; Tim Nichols; Craig Wiseman
- Producers: Joe Scaife; Mark Wright

Van Zant singles chronology
"Help Somebody" (2005)	"Nobody Gonna Tell Me What to Do" (2005)	"Things I Miss the Most" (2006)

"Nobody Gonna Tell Me What to Do" is a song recorded by American country music duo Van Zant. It was released in September 2005 as the second single from their album Get Right with the Man. The song was written by Tony Mullins, Tim Nichols and Craig Wiseman.

== Critical reception ==
In his review of the song, Kevin John Coyne of Country Universe called the duo "a great southern rock addition to the genre."

== Music video ==
The music video was directed by Trey Fanjoy and premiered in September 2005.

== Chart performance ==
The song debuted at number 59 on the U.S. Billboard Hot Country Songs chart for the week of October 8, 2005.

Chart (2005–2006)	Peak position
US Hot Country Songs (Billboard)	16
US Billboard Bubbling Under Hot 100	11
