= Stephanie Beaumont =

Canadian musician

- Born: 26 March 1974 (age 51); Halifax, Nova Scotia, Canada
- Genres: Country
- Occupation(s): singer, ceo
- Instrument: Vocals
- Years active: 1995–present

Stephanie Beaumont (born 26 March 1974) is a Canadian female country music artist. Beaumont first came to success with her 1996 debut album, Love & Dreams. Her second album, co-produced by singer-songwriter Jeffrey Steele, Way Over My Heart, was released in 1998. Both albums gave Beaumont numerous Canadian Country Music Association nominations including Rising Star and Female Vocalist. She also won Outstanding New Female Artist from the RPM Big Country Awards in 1999. Beaumont has also co-hosted Ottawa, Ontario's A Morning news program. Beaumont is the CEO and President of Sea And Be Scene.com—an entertainment based, magazine style website designed to celebrate Canada's four Atlantic Provinces.

== Discography ==
=== Albums ===
Year	Album
1996	Love and Dreams
1998	Way Over My Heart

=== Singles ===
Year	Song	CAN Country	Album
1995	"Love and Dreams"	40	Love and Dreams
1996	"Lover's Lullaby" (with James Owen Bush)	32	Love and Dreams
1996	"Tearing at the Heart of Me"	61	Love and Dreams
1997	"Just Like the Moon"	35	Love and Dreams
1997	"Stop! You're Breaking My Heart"	—	Love and Dreams
1998	"Whoever Said That"	37	Way Over My Heart
1998	"Already in Way Over My Heart"	30	Way Over My Heart
1999	"It's Not a Matter of Love"	34	Way Over My Heart
1999	"Let's Do Something About It"	45	Way Over My Heart
1999	"You and Me and Love"	63	Way Over My Heart
2000	"Who Says?"	—	Way Over My Heart
