= No More Dirty Deals =

Studio album by Johnny Van Zant
- Released: August 18, 1980
- Genre: Southern Rock
- Label: Polydor Records
- Producer: Al Kooper

Johnny Van Zant chronology
No More Dirty Deals (1980)	Round Two (1981)

No More Dirty Deals is Johnny Van Zant's début solo album.

== Track listing ==
1. "No More Dirty Deals" (Johnny Van Zant, Erik Lundgren, Donnie Van Zant) – 5:25
2. "Coming Home" (J. Van Zant, Robert Gay) - 4:08
3. "634-5789" (Eddie Floyd, Steve Cropper) – 2:43
4. "Put My Trust in You" (J. Van Zant, Gay, Robert Morris) – 2:44
5. "Only the Strong Survive" (J. Van Zant, Marvin Jarret, Gay, Morris) – 4:14
6. "Hard Luck Story" (J. Van Zant, Lundgren) – 3:08
7. "Stand Your Ground" (D. Van Zant, J. Van Zant, Gay) – 3:11
8. "Never Too Late" (J. Van Zant, Lundgren) – 3:44
9. "Keep On Rollin'" (J. Van Zant, Al Kooper, Danny Clausman, Gay) – 3:27
10. "Standing in the Darkness" (J. Van Zant, Gay) – 4:57

== Personnel ==
- Johnny Van Zant - vocals
- Gene Morford, Jerry Whitman, John Bahler, Julia Tillman Waters, Lorna Willard, Marti McCall, Myrna Matthews, Ron Hicklin - backing vocals
- Robbie Gay - lead guitar
- Erik Lundgren - lead guitar
- Danny Clausman - bass guitar
- Robbie Morris - drums
- Al Kooper - keyboards
- Ernie Watts - Saxophone, Flute
