= Help Somebody =

Single by Van Zant

from the album Get Right with the Man
- Released: March 7, 2005
- Recorded: January 2005
- Genre: Country
- Length: 4:13
- Label: Columbia Nashville
- Songwriters: Kip Raines; Jeffrey Steele
- Producers: Joe Scaife; Mark Wright

Van Zant singles chronology
"Get What You Got Comin'" (2001)	"Help Somebody" (2005)	"Nobody Gonna Tell Me What to Do" (2005)

"Help Somebody" is a song written by Jeffrey Steele and Kip Raines, and recorded by American country music duo Van Zant. It was released in March 2005 as the first single from their album Get Right with the Man. It peaked at number 8 in the United States. This song was their first entry on the country charts.

== Music video ==
The music video was directed by Peter Zavadil.

== Chart performance ==
"Help Somebody" debuted at number 44 on the U.S. Billboard Hot Country Singles & Tracks for the week of March 26, 2005.

Chart (2005)	Peak position
Canada Country (Radio & Records)	29
US Hot Country Songs (Billboard)	8
US Billboard Hot 100	66

=== Year-end charts ===
Chart (2005)	Position
US Country Songs (Billboard)	42
