= She'd Give Anything (song) =

1993 single by Boy Howdy

Single by Boy Howdy

from the EP She'd Give Anything
- Released: October 25, 1993
- Genre: Country
- Length: 3:38
- Label: Curb
- Songwriters: Chris Farren; Vince Melamed; Jeffrey Steele
- Producer: Chris Farren

Boy Howdy singles chronology
"A Cowboy's Born with a Broken Heart" (1993)	"She'd Give Anything" (1993)	"They Don't Make 'Em Like That Anymore" (1994)

"She'd Give Anything" is a song written by Jeffrey Steele, Chris Farren and Vince Melamed, and recorded by American country music group Boy Howdy. It was released in October 1993 as the first single and title track from their EP She'd Give Anything. The song reached number four on the US Billboard Hot Country Singles & Tracks chart in January 1994. The accompanying music video was directed by Sara Nichols and premiered in late 1993.

== Charts ==
=== Weekly charts ===
Chart (1993–1994)	Peak position
Canada Country Singles (RPM)	4
US Hot Country Songs (Billboard)	4

=== Year-end charts ===
Chart (1994)	Position
Canada Country Tracks (RPM)	72
US Country Songs (Billboard)	60

== Gerald Levert version ==
"I'd Give Anything"

Single by Gerald Levert

from the album Groove On
- Released: August 15, 1994
- Recorded: 1994
- Genre: R&B, pop, soul
- Length: 4:11
- Label: EastWest
- Songwriters: Chris Farren; Vince Melamed; Jeffrey Steele
- Producer: David Foster

The song was covered by American singer and songwriter Gerald Levert and produced by David Foster under the title "I'd Give Anything" in 1994. It was released by EastWest Records as the lead single from Levert's second album, Groove On (1994). The song peaked at numbers 27 and 28 on the US Cash Box Top 100 and Billboard Hot 100 charts.

=== Charts ===
==== Weekly charts ====
Chart (1994)	Peak position
US Billboard Hot 100	28
US Hot R&B Singles	4
US Rhythmic Top 40	21
US Cash Box Top 100	27

==== Year-end charts ====
Chart (1994)	Position
US Billboard Hot 100	98
