= A Cowboy's Born with a Broken Heart =

Single by Boy Howdy

from the album Welcome to Howdywood
- Released: June 19, 1993
- Genre: Country
- Length: 4:44
- Label: Curb
- Songwriters: Chris Farren; Jeffrey Steele
- Producer: Chris Farren

Boy Howdy singles chronology
"Thanks for the Ride" (1992)	"A Cowboy's Born with a Broken Heart" (1993)	"She'd Give Anything" (1993)

"A Cowboy's Born with a Broken Heart" is a song written by Chris Farren and Jeffrey Steele, and recorded by American country music band Boy Howdy. It was released in June 1993 as the second single from their album Welcome to Howdywood. The song reached number 12 on the Billboard Hot Country Singles & Tracks chart in September 1993.

== Content ==
The singer talks about how alone and pensive a cowboy is and has been since birth, implying that there is some mythical (if not genetic) and shared trait among cowboys that make them unique. The song emphasizes a cowboys honesty and good character while also hinting at a typical anti-social tendency.

== Chart performance ==
Chart (1993)	Peak position
Canada Country Singles (RPM)	16
US Hot Country Songs (Billboard)	12

== Music video ==
The music video was directed by Sara Nichols and produced by Tom Forrest.
