= Every Time I Hear Your Name =

Single by Keith Anderson

from the album Three Chord Country and American Rock & Roll
- Released: January 2, 2006
- Recorded: 2005
- Genre: Country
- Length: 4:23
- Label: Arista Nashville
- Songwriters: Jeffrey Steele, Tom Hambridge, Keith Anderson
- Producer: Jeffrey Steele

Keith Anderson singles chronology
"XXL" (2005)	"Every Time I Hear Your Name" (2006)	"Three Chord Country and American Rock & Roll" (2006)

"Every Time I Hear Your Name" is a song co-written and recorded by American country music artist Keith Anderson. It was released in January 2006 as the third single from his debut album Three Chord Country and American Rock & Roll. Anderson wrote this song with Jeffrey Steele and Tom Hambridge.

His first ballad single release, the song reached number 7 on the US Billboard Hot Country Songs chart and peaked at number 64 on the Billboard Hot 100. Also peaking at number 97 on the Pop 100, the song became Anderson's highest-peaking single to that point in his career.

== Music video ==
The music video was directed by Kristin Barlowe. It features Anderson performing the song with an old-fashioned microphone in a junkyard (he is seen in some scenes wearing a blue bandana instead of cowboy hat), on the interior of a fence, and in a warehouse. He is also seen making out with his lover in a convertible in the rain with the top down. It is informed that she is also a recording artist, and after her time in the studio, he picks her up in the convertible and they ride off together (after she passes another young couple who kiss).

== Chart positions ==
"Every Time I Hear Your Name" debuted at number 49 on the U.S. Billboard Hot Country Songs chart for the week of January 7, 2006.

Chart (2006)	Peak position
Canada Country (Radio & Records)	15
US Hot Country Songs (Billboard)	7
US Billboard Hot 100	64
US Billboard Pop 100	97

=== Year-end charts ===
Chart (2006)	Position
US Country Songs (Billboard)	18
