= Van Zant (duo) =

American musical duo

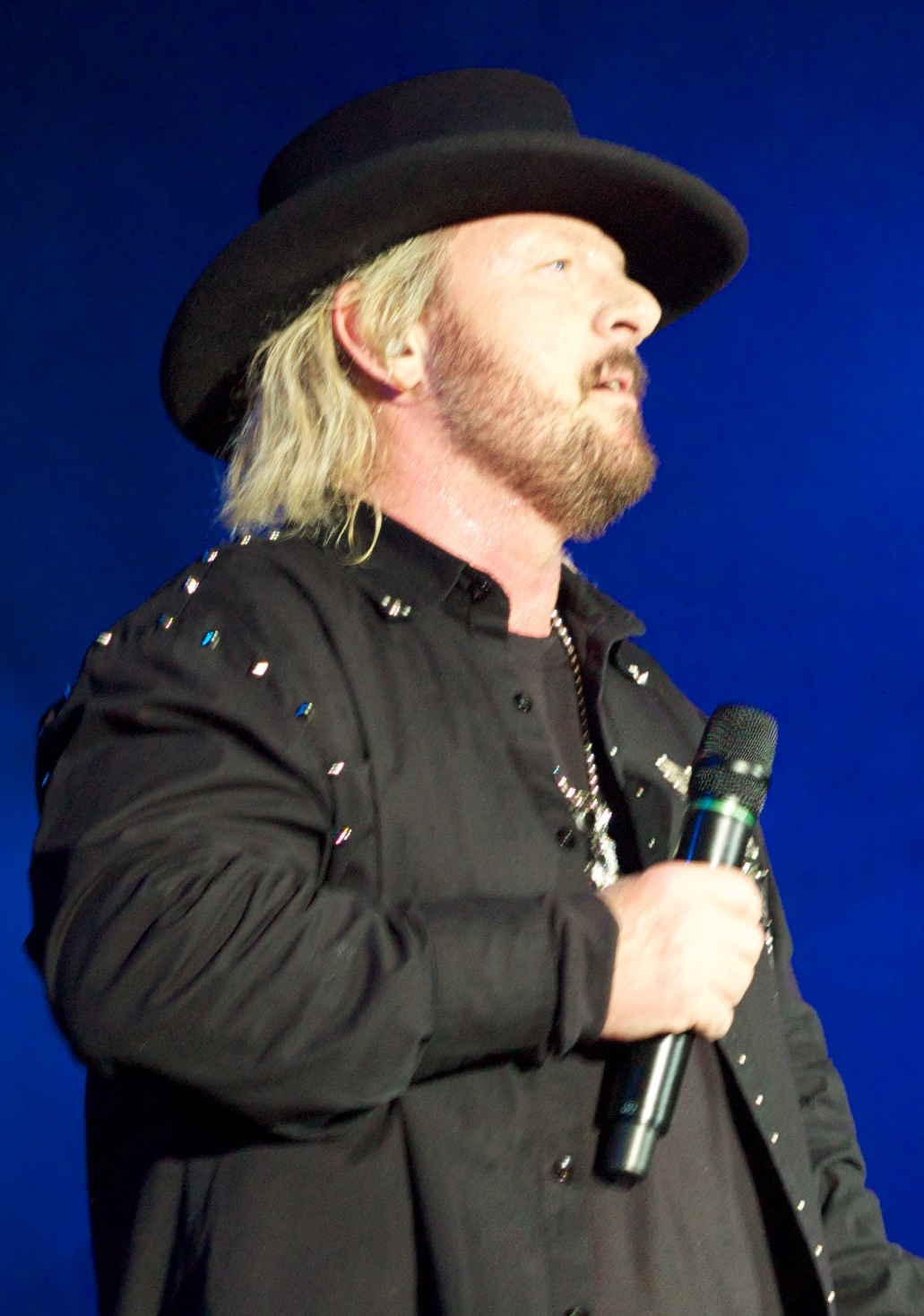
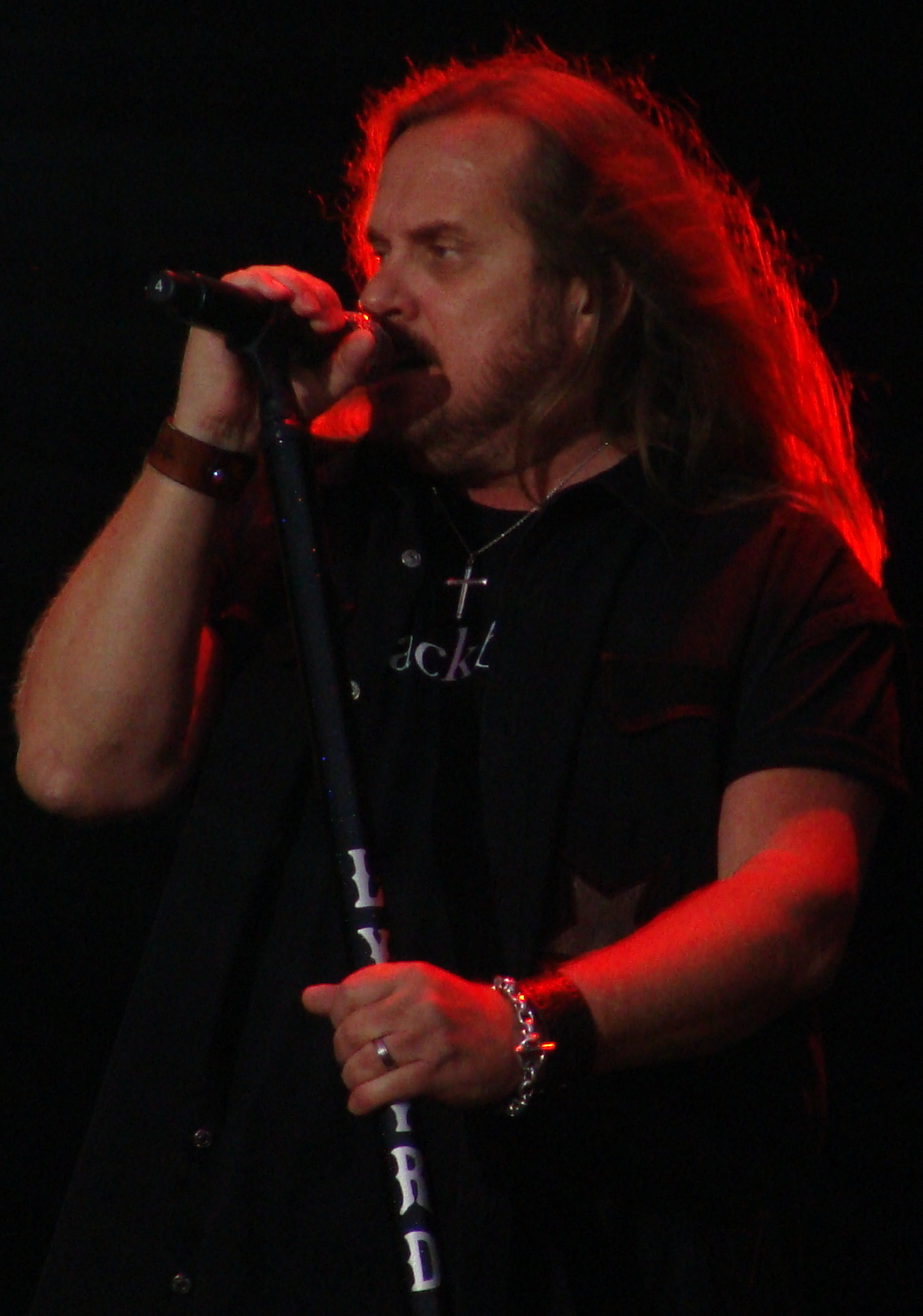
- Donnie and Johnny Van Zant

Background information
- Origin: Orange Park, Florida, U.S.
- Genres: Southern rock; country; arena rock; CCM
- Years active: 1981–1989; 1998–present
- Labels: Network; Geffen; CMC International; Columbia
- Spinoff of: .38 Special; Lynyrd Skynyrd
- Members: Donnie Van Zant; Johnny Van Zant

Van Zant is an American musical duo composed of brothers Donnie Van Zant and Johnny Van Zant. Both are brothers of Ronnie Van Zant, the original lead singer for the Southern rock band Lynyrd Skynyrd. Johnny became the lead vocalist for the reunited Lynyrd Skynyrd in 1987. Donnie was the leader and vocalist of .38 Special.

Initially a Southern rock band, Van Zant first recorded in the 1980s on Network /Geffen Records before disbanding. Johnny and Donnie re-established Van Zant in 1998 to record two albums for CMC International, switching their focus to country music in 2005, with two more albums on Columbia Records as a duo. The duo's first Columbia album, Get Right with the Man, produced a top ten country hit in "Help Somebody".

== History ==
Johnny recorded as a member of the 1980s southern rock band The Johnny Van Zant Band which released albums in 1980, 1981 and 1982. The band shortened its name to Van Zant for the release of its fourth album in 1985, the eponymous Van Zant on Network /Geffen Records. This album saw chart success with "You've Got to Believe in Love" and "I'm a Fighter" (written by Jimi Jamison and Mandy Meyer from Cobra), both of which peaked on the Mainstream Rock Tracks chart. However, this band did not include Donnie and was soon disbanded.

Johnny released another album under his full name in 1990, but spent most of his time in that period singing for the Lynyrd Skynyrd reunion group. He joined up with Donnie, and they revived the Van Zant name to release an album in 1998, Brother to Brother Initially intended as a one-off project, Brother to Brother saw chart success in the single "Rage", so the duo followed it up in 2001 with Van Zant II for the label. This album included their fourth charting rock single in "Get What You Got Comin'".

=== Country music career ===
In 2005, the duo crossed over into country music, releasing Get Right with the Man on Columbia Records. The album produced a Top 10 country single in "Help Somebody", followed by the No. 16 "Nobody Gonna Tell Me What to Do" and No. 59 "Things I Miss the Most". The album also earned RIAA gold certification. The Sony BMG copy protection rootkit scandal in 2005 began with an investigation of an installation of the CD Get Right with the Man.

It was not possible to import the CD into iTunes because of a glitch created by Sony's digital rights management software. The glitch was eventually fixed when the second Sony uninstaller offered allowed for the software to be removed. iTunes can import the CD now, even from the original copy-protected version of the disc.

Van Zant released a second album for Columbia, My Kind of Country, in 2007. This album included the singles "That Scares Me" and "Goes Down Easy", both of which failed to reach Top 40 on the country charts. After the release of the latter, the duo exited Columbia.

Donnie had been forced to retire from his work with 38 Special due to health problems in 2013. In 2019, Johnny stated in an interview that he and Donnie had continued to work on new music and were planning on releasing some of the work after Lynyrd Skynyrd disbanded.

In 2024, the duo released the album Always Look Up (Van Zant album). This album is described as mixing country, southern rock, and gospel music styles, with overtly Christian lyrics. Johnny Van Zant described their intentions for the album as: "We’ve been so low that the only place we could go is to look up. I hope our music touches even one person—then our mission for Jesus Christ is done."

== Discography ==
=== Studio albums ===
Title	Album details	Peak chart positions			Certifications (sales threshold)
Title	Album details	US Country	US	AUS	Certifications (sales threshold)
No More Dirty Deals (as Johnny Van Zant Band)	Release date: 1980; Label: Polydor Records; Formats: vinyl, cassette	—	—	84	
Van Zant	Release date: November 15, 1985; Label: Network, Geffen; Formats: 8-track, vinyl, cassette	—	170	—	
Brother to Brother	Release date: February 24, 1998; Label: CMC International; Formats: CD, cassette	—	—	—	
Van Zant II	Release date: March 6, 2001; Label: CMC International; Formats: CD	—	—	—	
Get Right with the Man	Release date: May 10, 2005; Label: Columbia Nashville; Formats: CD, music download	2	21	—	US: Gold
My Kind of Country	Release date: October 9, 2007; Label: Columbia Nashville; Formats: CD, music download	10	57	—	
"—" denotes releases that did not chart

=== Live albums ===
Title	Album details	Peak chart positions
Title	Album details	US Country
Red White & Blue (Live)	Release date: July 1, 2016; Label: Loud & Proud Records; Formats: CD, music download	39

=== Singles ===
Year	Single	Peak chart positions			Album
Year	Single	US Country	US	US Main Rock	Album
1985	"You've Got to Believe in Love"	—	102	27	Van Zant
1985	"I'm a Fighter"	—	—	16	Van Zant
1998	"Rage"	—	—	22	Brother to Brother
2001	"Get What You Got Comin'"	—	—	33	Van Zant II
2005	"Help Somebody"	8	66	—	Get Right with the Man
2005	"Nobody Gonna Tell Me What to Do"	16	111	—	Get Right with the Man
2006	"Things I Miss the Most"	60	—	—	Get Right with the Man
2007	"That Scares Me"	48	—	—	My Kind of Country
2007	"Goes Down Easy"	45	—	—	My Kind of Country
"—" denotes releases that did not chart

=== Guest singles ===
Year	Single	Artist	Peak chart positions	Album
Year	Single	Artist	US Country	Album
2006	"That's How They Do It in Dixie"	Hank Williams, Jr. (with Big & Rich and Gretchen Wilson)	35	That's How They Do It in Dixie: The Essential Collection

=== Music videos ===
Year	Video	Director
1985	"I'm a Fighter" (with "Marvelous" Marvin Hagler)	
2005	"Help Somebody"	Peter Zavadil
2005	"Nobody Gonna Tell Me What to Do"	Trey Fanjoy
2006	"Things I Miss the Most"	Peter Zavadil
2006	"That's How They Do It in Dixie" (with Big & Rich, Hank Williams, Jr. and Gretchen Wilson)	Deaton-Flanigen
2007	"Goes Down Easy"	Roman White
