= Johnny Van Zant =

American singer (born 1960)

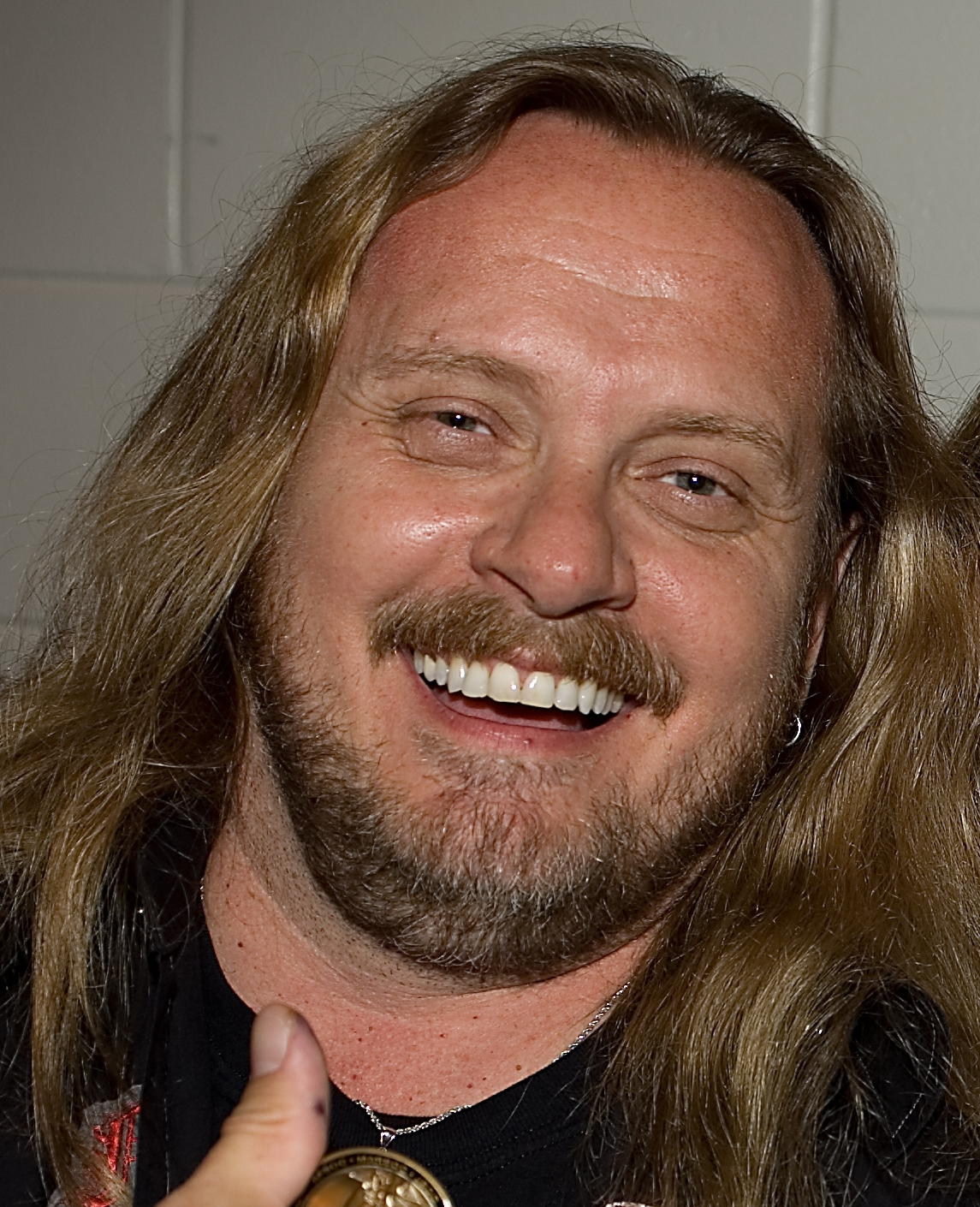
- Van Zant in 2007

Background information
- Born: John Roy Van Zant; February 27, 1960 (age 66); Jacksonville, Florida, U.S.
- Genres: Southern rock; country
- Occupation: Singer
- Years active: 1976–present
- Member of: Lynyrd Skynyrd; Van Zant
- Spouse: Lisa Van Zant

John Roy Van Zant (born February 27, 1960) is an American singer and the current lead vocalist of Southern rock band Lynyrd Skynyrd. He is the younger brother of Lynyrd Skynyrd co-founder and former lead vocalist Ronnie Van Zant, and of the 38 Special founder Donnie Van Zant.

== Biography ==
During the 1970s, Van Zant performed with his first band, the Austin Nickels Band. They later changed their name to The Johnny Van Zant Band releasing their debut solo album, No More Dirty Deals, in 1980. Early members of the Johnny Van Zant Band consisted of Van Zant on lead vocals, Robbie Gay on guitar, Danny Clausman, on bass, Erik Lundgren on lead guitar, Robbie Morris, drums and Joan Hecht (previously Joan Cusimano) and Nancy Henderson on background vocals. Van Zant released three more solo albums between 1981 and 1985, before taking a break from the music business.

Van Zant became lead vocalist and chief songwriter for the reunited Lynyrd Skynyrd in 1987 and continues to record and perform with them today. He released another solo album, Brickyard Road, in 1990, which featured the popular title track, which was a #1 hit on the U.S. Mainstream Rock Tracks chart for three weeks. He also records and performs with his brother, Donnie, as Van Zant since 1998.

In May 2006, less than one day before he was to perform at KSAN-FM 107.7 The Bone's Bone Bash 7, Van Zant underwent emergency surgery to have his appendix removed. After reporting pain to a doctor early in the day, he was treated at Stanford University Medical Center in Palo Alto, California. The incident forced the band to cancel three U.S. shows.

Van Zant is a fan of the Jacksonville Jaguars. He recorded a video, along with remaining members of Lynyrd Skynyrd, that is played at every Jaguars home game on the EverBank Stadium video board.

Van Zant and Lynyrd Skynyrd performed in Arizona on April 9, 2022, during Arizona Bike Week at WestWorld of Scottsdale. He stated that original member Gary Rossington was recovering and still needed prayers.

== Personal life ==
According to Skynyrd's website, Van Zant was again hospitalized on August 6, 2011, at the Hennepin County Medical Center in Minneapolis, Minnesota, due to complications from a previous surgery. According to the website, Van Zant had a "surgical site" infected with cellulitus which required both hospitalization and IV/Antibiotic treatment. He began displaying signs of a staph infection and other symptoms related to the infection. His subsequent illness resulted in a number of scheduled performances being cancelled.

Van Zant's spouse is Lisa Van Zant.

== Discography ==
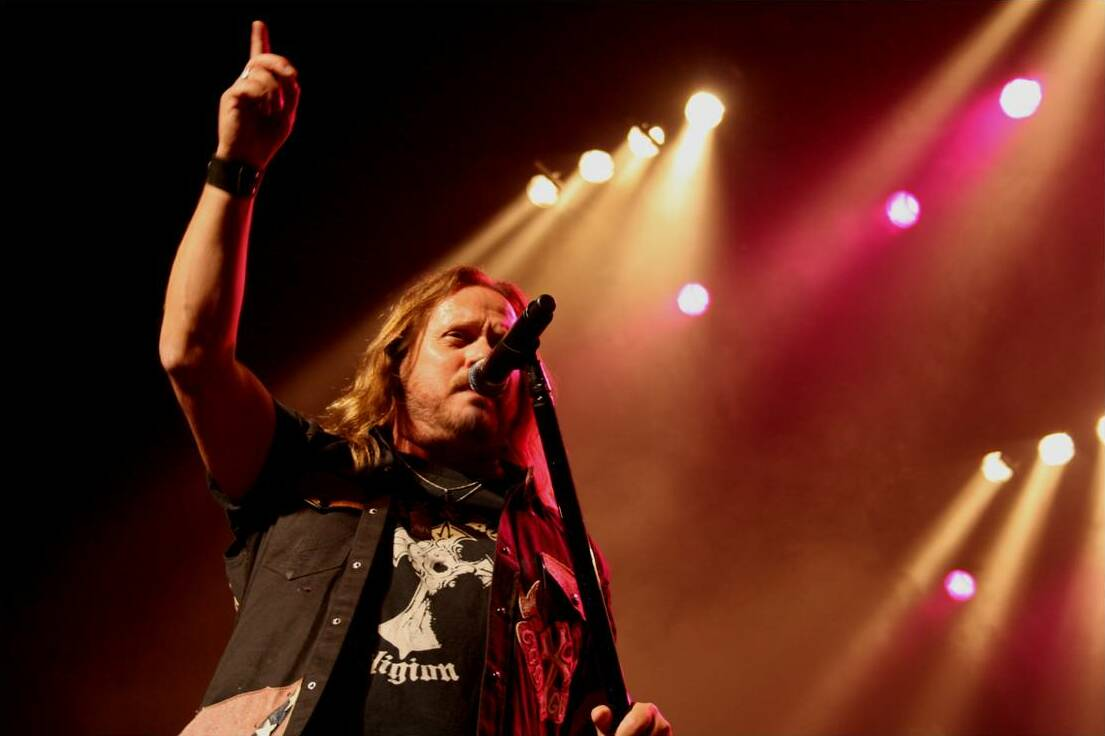
Van Zant performing with Lynyrd Skynyrd in 2009

Title	Release	Band
No More Dirty Deals	1980	The Johnny Van Zant Band
Round Two	1981	The Johnny Van Zant Band
The Last of the Wild Ones	1982	The Johnny Van Zant Band
Van Zant	1985	The Johnny Van Zant Band
Brickyard Road	1990	Solo
Lynyrd Skynyrd 1991	1991	Lynyrd Skynyrd
The Last Rebel	1993	Lynyrd Skynyrd
Endangered Species	1994	Lynyrd Skynyrd
Twenty	1997	Lynyrd Skynyrd
Edge of Forever	1998	Lynyrd Skynyrd
Brother to Brother	1998	Van Zant
Van Zant II	2001	Van Zant
Vicious Cycle	2003	Lynyrd Skynyrd
Get Right with the Man	2005	Van Zant
My Kind of Country	2007	Van Zant
God & Guns	2009	Lynyrd Skynyrd
Last of a Dyin' Breed	2012	Lynyrd Skynyrd
Always Look Up	2024	Van Zant

=== Music videos ===
Year	Video
1990	"Brickyard Road"
