= Drew Davis Band =

American musical group

- Origin: Los Angeles, California
- Genres: Rock, country
- Years active: 2001–2010
- Labels: Windswept, 903, Lofton Creek
- Past members: Drew Davis; Mike Drake; Loren Ellis; Jay Hawks; Mo Levone; Roger Malinowski

The Drew Davis Band was an American rock, country music group established in 2001 by Drew Davis (lead vocals, guitar), Mike Drake (guitar, harmonica, fiddle), Loren Ellis (banjo, guitar, mandolin, vocals), Jay Hawks (drums), Mo Levone (bass guitar, vocals), and Roger Malinkowski (keyboards).

In 2004, the band competed in and won the Colgate Country Showdown; shortly afterward, they were signed to Windswept Publishing, with a self-titled EP being released that year. Eventually, they were transferred to 903 Music, a short-lived record label founded by Neal McCoy; upon the label's closure in 2007, the band was transferred to Lofton Creek Records. Both Mike Drake and Jay Hawks have since left the group. The band's debut single, "Back There All the Time", entered the Billboard Hot Country Songs charts. It was included on both their self-titled EP and on their 2008 album Crossroads. Roger Malinowski left the band in 2009 to be David Spade's stuntman.

The Drew Davis Band was featured on an episode of Gene Simmons Family Jewels on August 9, 2009. The episode also featured a guest appearance by Trace Adkins. They also performed the theme song for the Disney Channel series Phil of the Future and The Suite Life of Zack & Cody.

== Discography ==
=== Studio albums ===
Title	Album details
Crossroads	Release date: July 8, 2008; Label: DELM Records

=== Extended plays ===
Title	Album details
Drew Davis Band EP	Release date: October 4, 2005; Label: Windswept Records

=== Singles ===
Year	Single	Peak positions	Album
Year	Single	US Country	Album
2005	"Back There All the Time"	—	Drew Davis Band EP
2008	"Back There All the Time" (re-release)	58	Crossroads
2008	"How Do I"	—	Crossroads
"—" denotes releases that did not chart

=== Music videos ===
Year	Video
2005	"Back There All the Time"
