= Boy Howdy =

American musical group

- Boy Howdy promotional image. L-R: Cary Park, Jeffrey Steele, Larry Park, Hugh Wright.

Background information
- Origin: Los Angeles, California, USA
- Genres: Country
- Years active: 1990 – 1996
- Label: Curb
- Past members: Cary Park; Larry Park; Jeffrey Steele; Hugh Wright

Boy Howdy was an American country music band founded in 1990 in Los Angeles, California. Its members were Jeffrey Steele (lead vocals, bass guitar), Hugh Wright (drums), and brothers Cary Park (guitar, mandolin, vocals) and Larry Park (guitar, fiddle, vocals). Between 1992 and 1995, the band recorded two albums (1992's Welcome to Howdywood and 1995's Born That Way) and an extended play (1994's She'd Give Anything), all on the Curb Records label. In that same time span, Boy Howdy charted seven singles on the Billboard Hot Country Singles & Tracks (now Hot Country Songs) charts, including the Top Five hits "She'd Give Anything" and "They Don't Make 'Em Like That Anymore." After Boy Howdy disbanded in 1996, Steele worked as both a solo artist and songwriter.

== History ==
Boy Howdy was founded in Los Angeles, California, United States in 1990. Before the band's formation, lead singer Jeffrey Steele worked as a songwriter and solo artist in California. Brothers Larry and Cary Park, sons of bluegrass music artist Ray Park, met Steele at a gig at a club; drummer Hugh Wright, also present at the gig, soon joined.

Boy Howdy initially recorded several demos through the assistance of producer James Stroud. A year after their formation, the band independently released a rendition of the Civil War standard, "When Johnny Comes Marching Home," at the height of the Gulf War. This single was so well-received that it caught the attention of Curb Records, a Nashville, Tennessee, record label, which signed the band in 1992. That same year, Boy Howdy released its debut album titled Welcome to Howdywood, from which two singles were issued: "Our Love Was Meant to Be" and "A Cowboy's Born with a Broken Heart". These peaked at No. 43 and No. 12, respectively, on the Billboard country charts. The album also included a cover of The Kinks' "You Really Got Me".

On May 30, 1992, Wright was involved in a motorcycle accident in Dallas, Texas, while trying to assist a driver who had crashed his pickup truck on the median of the LBJ Freeway. The accident placed Wright in a coma for five months. After coming out of the coma, Wright had to re-learn how to walk and play drums. In addition, his speech was impaired and, as a result, was no longer able to sing. Notwithstanding, however, he officially rejoined Boy Howdy on July 1, 1993.

Shortly after Wright's reunion with Boy Howdy, the band released the single "She'd Give Anything", which became its first Top 5 hit on the Billboard country music charts, peaking at No. 4. The music video for "She'd Give Anything" was also a No. 1 video on both Country Music Television and The Nashville Network. "She'd Give Anything" was included on an extended play of the same name, which containing four previously unreleased songs as well as a re-issue of "A Cowboy's Born with a Broken Heart." One of the four new songs, "They Don't Make 'Em Like That Anymore" was the EP's other single; it was also the band's highest-charting single, reaching No. 2. Following this was a largely unsuccessful third release, Born That Way, which produced a No. 23 single in "True to His Word" and three other singles, none of which entered the Top 40.

In 1994, they were nominated by the Academy of Country Music for the Top New Vocal Group award, along with Blackhawk and Gibson/Miller Band, but lost to Gibson/Miller.

== Disbanding ==
In February 1996, a year after the release of Born That Way, the four members announced that the band was "on hold" with no immediate plans to resume performing together, and by August of that same year, they had disbanded. Steele then moved to Nashville, Tennessee, where he began a solo career. He recorded an unreleased album for Curb, but later switched his focus to songwriting, including singles for Kevin Sharp, Diamond Rio and LeAnn Rimes. Steele charted the No. 33 single "Something in the Water" in 2001 on Monument Records, and has since become primarily known as a songwriter, although he has self-released several albums as well.

Drummer and co-founder Hugh Wright (born on December 18, 1951, in Des Moines, Iowa) died of natural causes on September 25, 2015, at age 63.

== Discography ==
=== Studio albums ===
Title	Album details	Peak positions
Title	Album details	US Country
Welcome to Howdywood	Release date: July 28, 1992; Label: Curb Records	—
Born That Way	Release date: February 14, 1995; Label: Curb Records	73
"—" denotes releases that did not chart

=== Extended plays ===
Title	Album details	Peak chart positions		
Title	Album details	US Country	US	US Heat
She'd Give Anything	Release date: January 11, 1994; Label: Curb Records	19	103	5

=== Singles ===
Year	Single	Peak chart positions		Album
Year	Single	US Country	CAN Country	Album
1992	"Our Love Was Meant to Be"	43	87	Welcome to Howdywood
1992	"Thanks for the Ride"	—	—	Welcome to Howdywood
1993	"A Cowboy's Born with a Broken Heart"	12	16	Welcome to Howdywood
1993	"She'd Give Anything"	4	4	She'd Give Anything
1994	"They Don't Make 'Em Like That Anymore"	2	3	She'd Give Anything
1994	"True to His Word"	23	24	Born That Way
1995	"Bigger Fish to Fry"	57	70	Born That Way
1995	"She Can't Love You"	48	93	Born That Way
1995	"Field of Dreams"	—	91	Born That Way
"—" denotes releases that did not chart

=== Music videos ===
Year	Video	Director
1992	"Our Love Was Meant to Be"	Richard Jernigan
1992	"Thanks for the Ride"	Richard Jernigan
1993	"A Cowboy's Born with a Broken Heart"	Sara Nichols
1993	"She'd Give Anything"	Sara Nichols
1994	"True to His Word"	Sara Nichols
1995	"She Can't Love You"	D. J. Webster

== Awards and nominations ==
Year	Organization	Award	Nominee/Work	Result
1994	Academy of Country Music Awards	Top New Vocal Group or Duet	Boy Howdy	Nominated
