= Keith Anderson =

American country singer (born 1968)

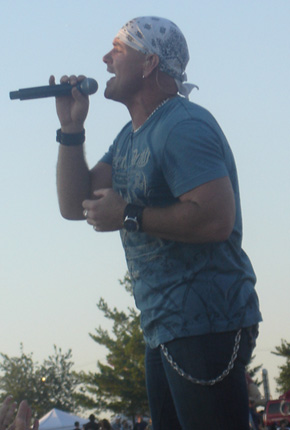
- Anderson performing at Country Thunder Wisconsin in Twin Lakes, Wisconsin, July 2007

Background information
- Born: January 12, 1968 (age 58)
- Origin: Miami, Oklahoma, U.S.
- Genres: Country
- Occupation: Singer-songwriter
- Instruments: Vocals; guitar
- Years active: 2001–present
- Labels: Arista Nashville; Columbia Nashville
- Website: keithanderson.com

Keith Anderson (born January 12, 1968) is an American country music singer. Before signing to a record deal, he was one of several co-writers of "Beer Run (B Double E Double R-U-N)", a duet by Garth Brooks and George Jones, released in late 2001. Anderson was signed as a recording artist to Arista Nashville in 2004. His debut single "Pickin' Wildflowers" was released in 2004, as the lead-off track from his debut album Three Chord Country and American Rock & Roll. Counting "Pickin' Wildflowers", four hit singles from the album were on the Billboard Hot Country Songs charts. The album was certified gold by the RIAA.

In addition to his own material, Anderson co-wrote Big & Rich's single "Lost in This Moment", a No. 1 hit on the country music charts in mid-2007. He switched to the Columbia Records in 2007, and his second album, C'mon!, was released on August 5, 2008. The second single from the album, "I Still Miss You", became his first Top 5 country hit. His latest release is a six-song EP titled I'll Bring the Music; it was released May 12, 2015.

== Early life ==
While growing up in Miami, Oklahoma he played sports during middle and high school; he played in a band at church. After graduating from high school, he attended Oklahoma State University in Stillwater, where he was in the Delta Tau Delta fraternity. He earned a degree in engineering at OSU. He also played baseball there and the Kansas City Royals took note of his playing. After a shoulder injury ended his pursuit of a professional baseball career, Anderson tried bodybuilding and placed second in the Mr. Oklahoma competition.

== Career ==
After graduating, he accepted a position with an engineering firm in Dallas. A year and a half later, he resigned to pursue a career in music. He went to clubs at night, began writing songs, and began learning guitar from his brother, Brian. In Dallas, he auditioned for Grapevine Opry, a show which had produced other country stars in the past. He performed on the show for three years, before performing at the Texas State Fair and Six Flags in Texas. Due to financial difficulties, he was forced to find additional work as a landscaper and as a personal trainer. He enrolled in the physical therapy program at the University of Texas in Austin. A month before beginning the course, he decided to put his education on hold and began producing his first CD. He said, "The month before I started, I thought, 'Wait a minute. This is going to be a whole bunch of commitment. If I'm ever going to do music, I need to go for it 100%. NOW. Physical therapy will always be there, and my engineering degree will always be there.'"

After recording his CD in Nashville, he began marketing it to radio stations. In 2000, he put together a band. His first hit as a songwriter came in 2001, when Garth Brooks and George Jones recorded "Beer Run (B Double E R-U-N)", which Anderson co-wrote with several other writers including George Ducas. Anderson opened for Montgomery Gentry in 2002 and performed at other events; he also signed a recording deal with Arista Nashville. Since then, he has written songs for Gretchen Wilson in addition to Big & Rich's No. 1 single "Lost in This Moment".

=== 2004–2006: Three Chord Country and American Rock and Roll ===
In 2004, Keith Anderson signed to Arista Nashville. His debut album, entitled Three Chord Country and American Rock & Roll, produced chart singles in "Pickin' Wildflowers", "XXL", and "Every Time I Hear Your Name". After "Every Time I Hear Your Name", the title track was remixed by Mark Hudson with Aerosmith lead singer Steven Tyler as a guest vocalist. After it failed to chart, "Podunk" was released as the album's final single and went to No. 34.

=== 2007–2009: C'mon! ===
Anderson released a song called "Sunday Morning in America" in early 2007 as the lead-off single to a second album for Arista. The song peaked at No. 28, however, and the album was delayed. Later in 2007, he switched from Arista Nashville to Columbia Nashville. His first single for the label, "I Still Miss You", was released in 2008 becoming his third Top Ten hit. It was the lead-off single to his second album C'mon!, released in August 2008, and "Sunday Morning in America" was included on it, as well as his own rendition of "Lost in This Moment" and a cover of Foster & Lloyd's "Crazy Over You". The album's third single, "Somebody Needs a Hug", peaked at No. 46 and the fourth single, "She Could've Been Mine" reached No. 56 in early 2009. Anderson parted ways with Columbia Nashville in October 2008.

=== 2010–present: I'll Bring the Music ===
Since 2010, Anderson has recorded and released a few tracks, via his fan club on his official website. The songs include "Wild Girls" and the underground hit "Your Town for Now". In May 2014, he released the single "I'll Bring the Music" which received airplay on The Highway. He released a six-song EP album titled I'll Bring the Music on May 12, 2015, via iTunes and Amazon. He also released a full-length album of the same name which was available on his website and sold at his shows in 2014.

== Personal life ==
Anderson and Lauren Woodruff married in December 2010, after 10 years of dating. They welcomed a daughter, Crozle J. Anderson, on October 5, 2011, and a son Jaxon born November 2013. They divorced in 2017.

== Discography ==
=== Studio albums ===
Title	Album details	Peak chart positions		Certifications (sales threshold)
Title	Album details	US Country	US	Certifications (sales threshold)
Three Chord Country and American Rock & Roll	Release date: May 3, 2005; Label: Arista Nashville; Formats: CD, music download	12	71	RIAA: Gold
C'mon!	Release date: August 5, 2008; Label: Columbia Nashville; Formats: CD, music download	3	12	
I'll Bring the Music	Release date: August 15, 2014; Label: Keith Anderson; Format: CD (Full Length Album available at his website and shows)	—	—	

=== Extended plays ===
Title	Album details
I'll Bring the Music	Release date: May 12, 2015; Label: self-released; Formats: CD, music download

=== Singles ===
Year	Single	Peak chart positions				Certifications	Album
Year	Single	US Country	US	CAN Country	CAN	Certifications	Album
2004	"Pickin' Wildflowers"	8	64	14	—	RIAA: Gold	Three Chord Country and American Rock & Roll
2005	"XXL"	23	122	—	—		Three Chord Country and American Rock & Roll
2006	"Every Time I Hear Your Name"	7	64	15	—		Three Chord Country and American Rock & Roll
2006	"Three Chord Country and American Rock & Roll" (featuring Steven Tyler)	—	—	—	—		Three Chord Country and American Rock & Roll
2006	"Podunk"	34	—	—	—		Three Chord Country and American Rock & Roll
2007	"Sunday Morning in America"	28	—	—	—		C'mon!
2008	"I Still Miss You"	2	48	9	95		C'mon!
2008	"Somebody Needs a Hug"	46	—	—	—		C'mon!
2009	"She Could've Been Mine"	56	—	—	—		C'mon!
2014	"I'll Bring the Music"	—	—	—	—		I'll Bring the Music
"—" denotes releases that did not chart

=== Music videos ===
Year	Video	Director
2005	"Pickin' Wildflowers"	Eric Welch
2005	"XXL"	Trey Fanjoy
2006	"Every Time I Hear Your Name"	Kristin Barlowe
2007	"Podunk"	Tony Holden
2008	"I Still Miss You"	Traci Goudie
