= Kevin Sharp =

American country music singer, author, and motivational speaker (1970-2014)

- Born: Kevin Grant Sharp; December 10, 1970; Redding, California, U.S.
- Died: April 19, 2014 (aged 43) Fair Oaks, California, U.S.
- Genre: Country
- Occupations: singer; author; motivational speaker
- Instrument: Vocals
- Years active: 1996–2014
- Labels: Asylum; Cupit

Kevin Grant Sharp (December 10, 1970 – April 19, 2014) was an American country music singer, author, and motivational speaker. Sharp came on the country music scene in 1996 with his first single: a cover of Tony Rich's "Nobody Knows", which topped the Billboard country chart for four weeks. The same year, Sharp released his first album, Measure of a Man. Having survived a form of bone cancer in his teenage years, Sharp became actively involved in the Make-A-Wish Foundation. He wrote an inspirational book about his life and his fight with cancer, and occasionally toured the United States as a motivational speaker. Sharp died from complications of stomach surgery in April 2014.

== Biography ==
=== Early years ===
Sharp was born December 10, 1970, in Redding, California. When he was seven years old, his family moved to Weiser, Idaho, to open a restaurant. Sharp performed in local musicals in high school, and stayed active in music after his family moved to Sacramento, California, in 1985. Starting in 1989, he began to experience dizziness and fatigue. He was diagnosed with Ewing's sarcoma, a rare form of bone cancer, and was given little chance of recovery. Through the Make-A-Wish Foundation, which grants wishes to children with life-threatening illnesses, Sharp met the record producer David Foster, with whom he soon became friends. After two years of chemotherapy and radiation treatment, when still in his early 20s, the cancer went into remission by the early 1990s, although he permanently lost all of his hair as a result of the radiation treatment. In high school, Sharp played football and basketball, but was unable to participate in either sport during his senior year because of his cancer. The doctors eventually discovered that the cancer had spread to his lungs. Sharp was a member of the Church of Jesus Christ of Latter-day Saints. He graduated from Bella Vista High School.

=== Musical career ===
After remission, Sharp worked at Great America in Santa Clara, California, while working on a demo tape, which he sent to various talent shows, and later to David Foster. Foster introduced him to A&R representatives and, by 1996, Sharp was signed to Asylum Records. His first album, Measure of a Man, was released in September 1996. The album's first single, a cover version of the R&B artist Tony Rich's "Nobody Knows", spent four weeks at number one on the Billboard Hot Country Singles & Tracks chart. He became a spokesperson for the Make-A-Wish Foundation, and was awarded the foundation's Wish Granter of the Year award, in 1997. He was named New Touring Artist of the Year by the Country Music Association and nominated for Top New Male Vocalist award by the Academy of Country Music.

In 1998, Sharp collapsed backstage at the TNN Music City News Country Awards, and was rushed to the hospital for emergency surgery, due to problems with steel rods in his hip. As a result, he had to cancel several tour dates. Measure of a Man produced two more top 10 country singles, "She's Sure Taking It Well" and "If You Love Somebody". The album's fourth single, "There's Only You", peaked at No. 43. His second album, Love Is, released in 1998 on Asylum, failed to produce any successful singles, and Sharp was dropped from Asylum's roster.

Sharp continued to perform as a musician, as well as a motivational speaker, and was also a spokesperson for the Make-A-Wish Foundation. He wrote a book, Tragedy's Gift, and published it in 2004. His third album, Make a Wish, was released on the independent Cupit Records label in 2005, although none of its five singles charted.

== Death ==
Sharp died on April 19, 2014, at the age of 43, of complications from stomach surgeries and digestive problems. He was survived by his mother Elaine Sharp, his ex-wife Traci Williams Sharp, and his siblings Lisa, Mary, Ron, Greg, Richard, Larry, and Genni. Kevin was preceded in death by his father, Glen Sharp, in 2009. Sharp never remarried.

== Discography ==
=== Studio albums ===
List of studio albums, with selected chart positions and certifications
Title	Details	Peak chart positions					Certifications
Title	Details	US Country	US	US Heat	CAN Country	CAN	Certifications
Measure of a Man	Released: September 24, 1996; Label: Asylum; Formats: CD, cassette, digital download, streaming	4	40	1	2	79	CAN: Platinum; US: 2× Platinum
Love Is	Released: June 23, 1998; Label: Asylum; Formats: CD, cassette, digital download, streaming	38	—	—	—	—	
Make a Wish	Released: July 26, 2005 (US only); Label: Cupit; Formats: CD, digital download, streaming	—	—	—	—	—	
"—" denotes a recording that did not chart or was not released in that territory.

=== Singles ===
==== As lead artist ====
List of singles as lead artist, with selected chart positions, showing year released and album name
Title	Year	Peak chart positions		Album
Title	Year	US Country	CAN Country	Album
"Nobody Knows"	1996	1	1	Measure of a Man
"She's Sure Taking It Well"	1997	3	4	Measure of a Man
"If You Love Somebody"	1997	4	7	Measure of a Man
"There's Only You"	1997	43	—	Measure of a Man
"Love Is All That Really Matters"	1998	51	63	Non-album single
"If She Only Knew"	1998	61	—	Love Is
"Beautiful People"	2001	—	—	Non-album single
"Your Love Reaches Me"	2005	—	—	Make a Wish
"I Think I'll Stay"	2005	—	—	Make a Wish
"You Are the Reason Why"	2006	—	—	Make a Wish
"Make a Wish"	2007	—	—	Make a Wish
"Let Me Rock You to Sleep"	2011	—	—	Make a Wish
"—" denotes a single that did not chart or was not released in that territory.

==== As featured artist ====
List of singles as featured artist, showing year released and album name
Title	Year	Album
"God Bless the Children" (Wayne Warner featuring Kevin Sharp and the Nashville All-Star Choir)	2006	Turbo Twang'n
"Dare the World" (Major Rising featuring Bryan White, John Berry, Mila Mason, Wayne Warner, Kevin Sharp, Jimmy Fortune, Linda Davis and Mark Collie)	2010	Non-album single

=== Music videos ===
List of music videos, showing year released and directors
Title	Year	Director(s)
"Nobody Knows"	1996	Jeffrey Phillips
"She's Sure Taking It Well"	1997	Norry Niven
"There's Only You"	1997	Norry Niven
"Love Is All That Really Matters"	1998	Norry Niven
"I Think I'll Stay"	2005	David Abbott
"You Are the Reason Why"	2006	Chris Rogers

== Awards and nominations ==
Year	Organization	Award	Nominee/Work	Result
1997	Academy of Country Music Awards	Top New Male Vocalist	Kevin Sharp	Nominated
1998	American Music Awards	Favorite Country New Artist	Kevin Sharp	Nominated
1998	TNN/Music City News Country Awards	Male Star of Tomorrow	Kevin Sharp	Nominated
