= Chris Farren (country musician) =

American songwriter

- Born: Kensington, Maryland
- Genres: Country
- Occupations: Songwriter; record producer
- Years active: 1983–present

Chris Farren is an American country music singer-songwriter and record producer. He is the president of Nashville-based Combustion Music, a publishing and music production company which was founded in 2001.

== Biography ==
After attending East Carolina University, Farren signed with MCA in 1983 for a songwriting contract, with which he composed songs for movies and television. He moved to Nashville, Tennessee, in the mid-1980s and sang backing vocals in addition to writing songs. Farren produced albums by Boy Howdy, Kevin Sharp, and Deana Carter in the 1990s, and was named Country Producer of the Year in 1997 by American Songwriter magazine. Farren also produced Deana Carter's 1996 album Did I Shave My Legs for This?

In 2001, Farren developed an interest in discovering and developing talent, signing Jeffrey Steele, Ashley Gorley, Kings of Leon, and Matthew West to Combustion Music. Farren has worked alongside Corey Kent, Kolby Cooper, Jameson Rodgers, Payton Smith and Daphne to develop their careers.

He has written songs for the Backstreet Boys, Gregg Allman, Michael McDonald, Air Supply, Rascal Flatts, Christopher Cross, Trace Adkins, 98 Degrees, and Olivia Newton-John, and has won 11 ASCAP Awards.

== Combustion Music ==
Combustion Music, created in 2001, has claimed 110 #1 songs from a roster inclusive of Matthew West, songwriter Brett Tyler, songwriter Thomas Archer, hitmaker Ashley Gorley, and songwriters Austin Goodloe, Jessica Farren and Sam Bergeson.

Farren created the Combustion Music Hope Town Music Festival in Elbow Cay, Bahamas. Since inception, the festival has raised over $3 million for local Bahamas community organizations.

== See also ==
- Category:Song recordings produced by Chris Farren (country musician)
