= Jeffrey Steele =

American singer-songwriter (born 1961)

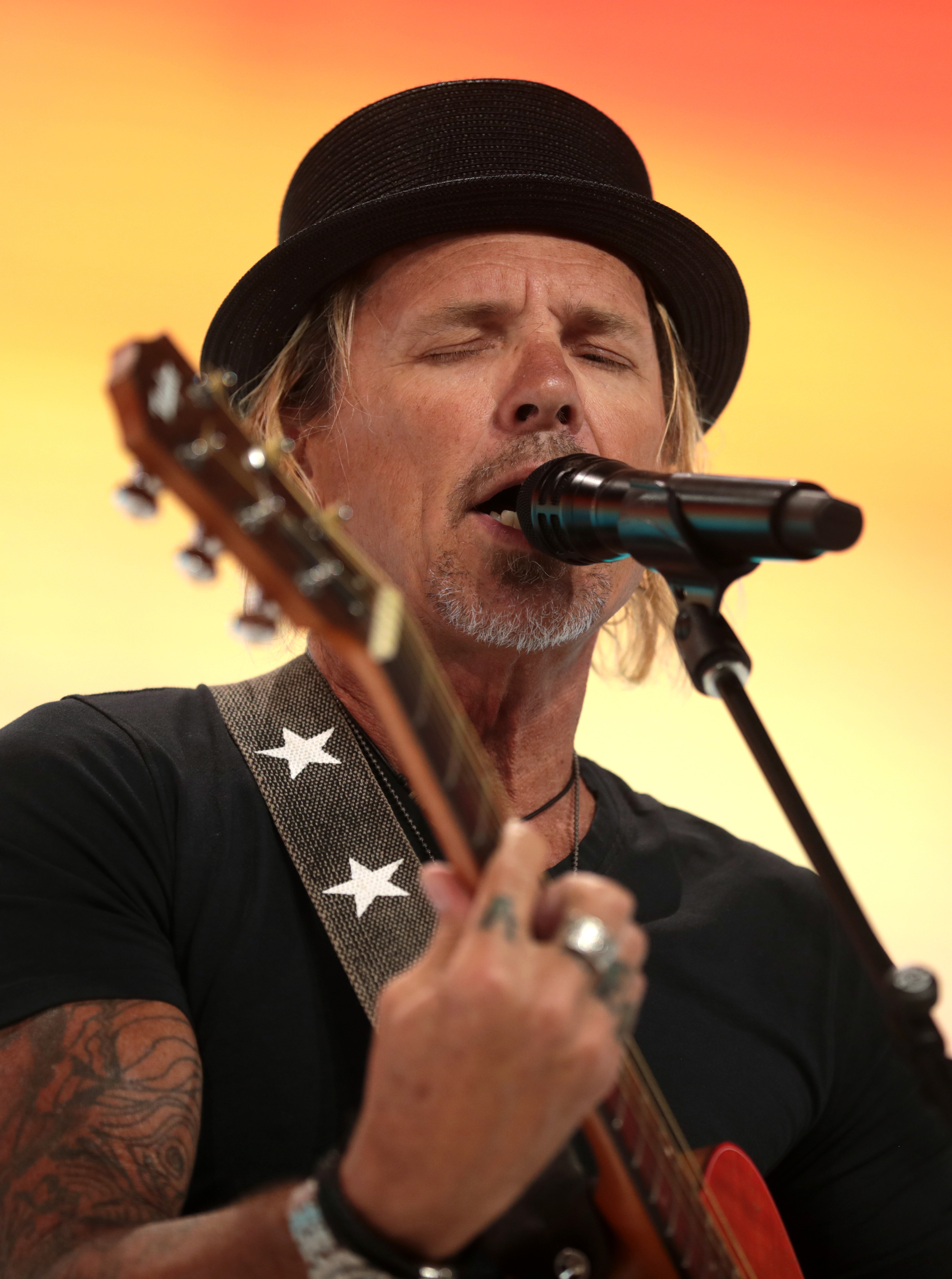
- Steele performing in 2021

Background information
- Born: Jeffrey LeVasseur; August 27, 1961 (age 64); Burbank, California, U.S.
- Genres: Country
- Occupation: Singer-songwriter
- Instruments: Vocals, guitar, bass guitar, piano
- Years active: 1990–present
- Labels: Curb, Monument, 3 Ring Circus/Lofton Creek
- Formerly of: Boy Howdy
- Website: www.jeffreysteele.net

Jeffrey LeVasseur (born August 27, 1961), known as Jeffrey Steele, is an American country music singer and songwriter. Along with recording his own material, Steele has become a prolific Nashville songwriter, having co-written more than 60 hit songs for such artists as Montgomery Gentry, Tim McGraw, Faith Hill, LeAnn Rimes, Rascal Flatts, Billy Ray Cyrus, and others.

Between 1990 and 1996, Steele was the lead singer and bass guitarist in the country music band Boy Howdy, which recorded two albums and an EP on Curb Records, in addition to charting seven singles on the Billboard country music charts. After Boy Howdy disbanded, Steele embarked on a solo career, recording seven studio albums (one of which was not released). He also charted four singles as a solo artist, with the highest-peaking ("Somethin' in the Water") reaching No. 33 on the country charts in 2001.

== Biography ==
Jeffrey LeVasseur was born in Burbank, California to a musical family. His mother was a singer, and his father had aspirations to become a country music songwriter. He first gained his own interest in music at age eight, when he sang Three Dog Night's "Joy to the World" at a church function. This rendition earned him a standing ovation, so he sang the song an additional seven times. Later, he shifted his focus to songwriting. By age 17, he was performing with local groups, and playing keyboards at various gigs on the Sunset Strip in Los Angeles. In 1987, after the death of his father, LeVasseur changed his last name to Steele as a tribute to his father, who processed steel for a living.

== Boy Howdy ==
In 1990, Steele and three other California musicians – Hugh Wright, along with brothers Cary and Larry Park – formed the band Boy Howdy, in which he served as lead vocalist and bass guitarist. Jeffrey Steele wrote a song, 'When Johnny Comes Marching Home' about the returning veterans from the Gulf war. Curb signed Boy Howdy, but made them change their group name to 'New Frontier'. They went to appear on 'Nashville Now' hosted by Ralph Emery, who liked the band name Boy Howdy. This helped convince Curb records to let them keep the Boy Howdy name. The war ended so soon that the single was never released. Boy Howdy signed to Curb Records in 1992, recording three albums and an extended play for the label, in addition to charting seven singles on the country music charts. While in Boy Howdy, Steele was named Best Bassist and Best Male Vocalist by the California Country Music Association. As the band's primary songwriter, he also earned BMI awards for co-writing their highest-charting singles, "She'd Give Anything" and "They Don't Make 'Em Like That Anymore".

== Solo career and success as songwriter ==
Steele re-located to Nashville, Tennessee in 1994, two years before Boy Howdy disbanded. In 1996, he released three solo singles, as well as a self-titled solo album which was never shipped. Steele was eventually signed to a songwriting contract, however, and he began writing singles for other artists. Among his first hits as a songwriter were "If You Love Somebody" by Kevin Sharp, "Unbelievable" by Diamond Rio, and "Big Deal" by LeAnn Rimes, all three of which earned him additional BMI awards. He also sang backing vocals on Sharp's first two albums.

In 2001, Steele was signed to his second solo recording contract, this time with Monument Records. His solo debut album, Somethin' in the Water, was issued late that year. In addition to producing the album, Steele wrote or co-wrote every song on it. The album's title cut reached a peak of No. 33 on the Hot Country Singles & Tracks chart, becoming Steele's only Top 40 hit as a solo artist.

Meanwhile, he continued to write songs for other artists, with Faith Hill, Tim McGraw, Trace Adkins, and Montgomery Gentry all recording songs he had co-written. Steele earned his first Number One song with Tim McGraw's "The Cowboy in Me" in 2002. In addition, Rascal Flatts reached Number One on the country charts in late 2002 with "These Days", their first Number One single. Steele also continued to record studio albums even while writing hits for other artists; his albums Gold, Platinum, Chrome and Steele and You Gotta Start Somewhere were both released in 2003, the same year that he was named Songwriter of the Year by both BMI and the Nashville Songwriters Association International (NSAI). 2004 saw the release of his fourth studio album, Outlaw, on the Lofton Creek Records label. By 2005, more than sixty of his songs had become chart hits for other artists; that same year, he received a second Songwriter of the Year award from the NSAI.

His most successful single as a songwriter is "What Hurts the Most", co-written with English songwriter Steve Robson. The song was a Number One single on both the Hot Country Songs and Hot Adult Contemporary Tracks charts for Rascal Flatts in 2006, and was also a chart single for Cascada in 2007. Another one of Steele's compositions, Steve Holy's Number One single "Brand New Girlfriend", earned him yet another BMI award in 2006, as well as the Rascal Flatts hit "My Wish" just as Steele released his album, Hell on Wheels. "What Hurts the Most" would later earn him the Songwriter of the Year and Song of the Year awards from BMI, as well as the Songwriter of the Year award from MusicRow magazine. Steele has since released two other albums, his second greatest hits record "Gold, Platinum, No Chrome, and More Steele" was released in 2007 and his country classics tribute album "Countrypolitan" which was released in 2008. Steele also produced Keith Anderson's two studio albums: 2005's Three Chord Country and American Rock & Roll and 2008's C'mon!, as well as Montgomery Gentry's 2004 album You Do Your Thing and 2006 album Some People Change In 2016 "Chasing Down a Good Time" Steele co-wrote with Anthony Smith by Randy Houser.

In April 2008, Steele joined Jewel and John Rich of Big & Rich as judges on the talent show Nashville Star. Steele has also guest hosted for Bob Kingsley twice on the radio show Bob Kingsley's Country Top 40, a weekly radio countdown show based on the Mediabase country charts: for the weeks of September 13–14, 2008 and October 3–4, 2009.

In September 2008, The Country Music Hall of Fame honored Steele as a Poet & Prophet in the Hall of Fame's quarterly series.

In 1996, he was nominated for Best Country Instrumental Performance at the Grammy Awards.

In 2006, he was nominated for Best Country Song at the Grammy Awards.

In 2014, he was nominated for Best Country Song at the Grammy Awards. He also featured on the single "Mud" by The Road Hammers.

Steele signed a deal with Best Buy to release 3 of his albums November 18, 2008: "Hell On Wheels", "Gold, Platinum, No Chrome, and More Steele: Greatest Hits Vol. II", and "Countrypolitan"

Steele also co-wrote the song "I Thought I Lost You" with Miley Cyrus for the 2008 Disney animated film Bolt, which Cyrus sings as a duet with John Travolta.

== Discography ==
=== Albums ===
Title	Album details
Somethin' in the Water	Release date: October 30, 2001; Label: Monument Records
Gold, Platinum, Chrome, and Steele	Release date: 2003; Label: 3 Ring Circus/Lofton Creek Records
You Gotta Start Somewhere	Release date: 2003; Label: 3 Ring Circus/Lofton Creek Records
Outlaw	Release date: September 21, 2004; Label: 3 Ring Circus/Lofton Creek Records
Hell on Wheels	Release date: February 28, 2006; Label: 3 Ring Circus/Lofton Creek Records
Gold, Platinum, No Chrome, and More Steele	Release date: 2007; Label: 3 Ring Circus/Lofton Creek Records
Countrypolitan	Release date: November 18, 2008; Label: 3 Ring Circus

=== Singles ===
Year	Single	Peak positions	Album
Year	Single	US Country	Album
1996	"Roots of Country"	—	America's Music: The Roots of Country
1997	"A Girl Like You"	60	Jeffrey Steele (unreleased)
1997	"My Greatest Love"^{[A]}	—	Jeffrey Steele (unreleased)
2001	"Somethin' in the Water"	33	Somethin' in the Water
2002	"I Can Give You Love Like That"	—	Somethin' in the Water
2002	"Good to Go"	49	—N/a
2004	"Good Year for the Outlaw"	54	Outlaw
2004	"Twenty Years Ago"	—	Outlaw
2004	"Once a Cowboy"	—	Outlaw
2005	"Just the Way We Do It"	—	Outlaw
2005	"She Must Be So Happy"	—	Outlaw
"—" denotes releases that did not chart

Notes

- A "My Greatest Love" peaked at number 90 on the RPM Country Tracks chart in Canada.

=== Music videos ===
Year	Video	Director
1996	"The Roots of Country"	Steven T. Miller/R. Brad Murano
2001	"Somethin' in the Water"	Paul Holahan
2004	"Once a Cowboy"	
