= Phil Vassar discography =

- Vassar performing in July 2007.
- Studio albums: 7
- Extended plays: 1
- Live albums: 1
- Compilation albums: 3
- Singles: 22
- Music videos: 18
- No. 1 Singles: 3

The discography of American country music singer-songwriter Phil Vassar consists of seven studio albums (including one holiday album), three compilation albums, one live album and twenty-two singles. Before his signing with Arista Nashville in 1999, Vassar was a prominent songwriter, having co-written number one hits for Jo Dee Messina and Alan Jackson, and Top 5 singles for Tim McGraw and Collin Raye. As a singer, Vassar has reached number one on the country music charts three times.

== Albums ==
=== Studio albums ===
| Title | Album details | Peak positions | | Certifications |
| Title | Album details | US Country | US | Certifications |
|---|---|---|---|---|
| Phil Vassar (Note: Phil Vassar also peaked at number 12 on the Billboard Heatseekers Albums chart.) | Release date: February 22, 2000; Label: Arista Nashville; Formats: CD, music download | 23 | — | US: Gold |
| American Child | Release date: August 6, 2002; Label: Arista Nashville; Formats: CD, music download | 4 | 44 | |
| Shaken Not Stirred | Release date: September 28, 2004; Label: Arista Nashville; Formats: CD, music download | 10 | 69 | |
| Prayer of a Common Man | Release date: April 22, 2008; Label: Universal South Records; Formats: CD, music download | 3 | 10 | |
| Traveling Circus | Release date: December 15, 2009; Label: Universal South Records; Formats: CD, music download | 29 | 198 | |
| Noel | Release date: November 22, 2011; Label: Rodeowave Entertainment; Formats: CD, music download | — | — | |
| American Soul (Note: American Soul peaked at number 40 on the Billboard Independent Albums chart.) | Release date: December 2, 2016; Label: The Orchard; Formats: CD, music download | — | — | |
| Stripped Down | Release date: January 17, 2020; Label: American Soul; Format: Music download | — | — | |
"—" denotes releases that did not chart

=== Compilation albums ===
| Title | Album details | Peak chart positions | |
| Title | Album details | US Country | US |
|---|---|---|---|
| Greatest Hits, Vol. 1 | Release date: May 2, 2006; Label: Arista Nashville; Formats: CD, music download | 2 | 10 |
| Super Hits | Release date: September 25, 2007; Label: Sony BMG; Formats: CD, music download | — | — |
| Playlist: The Very Best of Phil Vassar (Note: Playlist: The Very Best of Phil Vassar is a re-issue of Greatest Hits, Vol. 1.) | Release date: October 18, 2011; Label: Legacy Recordings; Formats: CD, music download | — | — |
"—" denotes releases that did not chart

=== Live albums ===
| Title | Album details |
|---|---|
| The Hits Live on Broadway | Release date: November 22, 2011; Label: Rodeowave Entertainment; Formats: CD, music download |

== Extended plays ==
| Title | Album details |
|---|---|
| American Soul Summer | Release date: May 19, 2017; Label: The Orchard; Formats: Music download |

== Singles ==
| Year | Single | Peak positions | | | Album |
| Year | Single | US Country | US | CAN Country | Album |
|---|---|---|---|---|---|
| 1999 | "Carlene" | 5 | 45 | 1 | Phil Vassar |
| 2000 | "Just Another Day in Paradise" | 1 | 35 | 2 (Note: "Just Another in Paradise" had reached number 2 when RPM ceased publication in November 2000.) | Phil Vassar |
| 2001 | "Rose Bouquet" | 16 | 78 | — | Phil Vassar |
| 2001 | "Six-Pack Summer" | 9 | 56 | — | Phil Vassar |
| 2001 | "That's When I Love You" | 3 | 37 | — | Phil Vassar |
| 2002 | "American Child" | 5 | 48 | — | American Child |
| 2003 | "This Is God" (Note: "This Is God" is only included on later presses of American Child.) | 17 | — (Note: "This Is God" did not enter the Hot 100, but peaked at number 9 on Bubbling Under Hot 100 Singles, which acts a 25-song extension of the Hot 100.) | — | American Child |
| 2003 | "Ultimate Love" | 41 | — | — | American Child |
| 2004 | "In a Real Love" | 1 | 38 | 11 | Shaken Not Stirred |
| 2004 | "I'll Take That as a Yes (The Hot Tub Song)" | 17 | 89 | — | Shaken Not Stirred |
| 2005 | "Good Ole Days" | 22 | — | — | Shaken Not Stirred |
| 2006 | "Last Day of My Life" | 2 | 47 | 3 | Greatest Hits, Vol. 1 |
| 2006 | "The Woman in My Life" | 20 | — | — | Greatest Hits, Vol. 1 |
| 2007 | "This Is My Life" | 35 | — | — | Prayer of a Common Man |
| 2007 | "Love Is a Beautiful Thing" | 2 | 48 | 17 | Prayer of a Common Man |
| 2008 | "I Would" | 26 | — | — | Prayer of a Common Man |
| 2009 | "Prayer of a Common Man" | 53 | — | — | Prayer of a Common Man |
| 2009 | "Bobbi with an I" | 46 | — | — | Traveling Circus |
| 2009 | "Everywhere I Go" | 36 | — | — | Traveling Circus |
| 2011 | "Let's Get Together" | 36 | — | — | Non-album single |
| 2012 | "Don't Miss Your Life" | 32 | — | 45 | Non-album single |
| 2013 | "Love Is Alive" | — (Note: "Love Is Alive" did not enter Hot Country Songs, but peaked at number 36 on Country Airplay.) | — | — | Non-album single |
"—" denotes releases that did not chart

=== Promotional singles ===
| Year | Single | Album |
|---|---|---|
| 2002 | "Words Are Your Wheels" (Note: Charity single featuring Brooks & Dunn, Kenny Chesney, Sara Evans, and Martina McBride.) | Non-album single |

== Videography ==
=== Music videos ===
| Year | Video | Director |
|---|---|---|
| 2000 | "Carlene" | Gerry Wenner |
| 2000 | "Just Another Day In Paradise" | Gerry Wenner |
| 2001 | "Rose Bouquet" | Gerry Wenner |
| 2001 | "Six-Pack Summer" | Glen Rose |
| 2002 | "American Child" | Shaun Silva |
| 2003 | "This Is God" | Deaton-Flanigen Productions |
| 2003 | "Athens Grease" | Trey Fanjoy |
| 2004 | "I'll Take That as a Yes (The Hot Tub Song)" | Shaun Silva |
| 2005 | "Good Ole Days" | Ryan Craig |
| 2006 | "Last Day of My Life" | Roman White |
| 2007 | "This Is My Life" | Peter Zavadil |
| 2008 | "Love Is a Beautiful Thing" | Peter Zavadil |
| 2009 | "Bobbi with an I" | Eric Welch |
| 2009 | "Everywhere I Go" | Chris Cella |
| 2011 | "Let's Get Together" | Mason Dixon |
| 2012 | "Don't Miss Your Life" | Steve Condon |
| 2012 | "Santa's Gone Hollywood" | Steve Condon |
| 2013 | "Love Is Alive" | Steve Condon |
| 2017 | "The Naughty List" | |
| 2018 | "Not So Silent Night" | |
