= List of songs written by Phil Vassar =

This is an alphabetical list of songs written or co–written by the American singer–songwriter Phil Vassar.

"Song" – Artist (co-writers)

== A ==
- "Ain't Nothin' Like It" – Neal McCoy (Charlie Black, Tommy Rocco)
- "Amazing Grace" – Phil Vassar (Craig Wiseman)
- "American Child" – Phil Vassar (Craig Wiseman)
- "Around Here Somewhere" – Phil Vassar (Charlie Black, Tommy Rocco)
- "Athens Grease" – Phil Vassar (Steve Mandile, Jerry Vandiver)

== B ==
- "Baby Rocks" – Phil Vassar (Jeffrey E. Smith, Billy Alcorn)
- "Baby You're Right" – Phil Vassar (Brett James)
- "Black and Whites" – Phil Vassar (Craig Wiseman)
- "Bobbi with an I" – Phil Vassar (Craig Wiseman)
- "Boston" – Kenny Chesney (Kenny Chesney, Mark Tamburino)
- "Bye, Bye" – Jo Dee Messina (Rory Bourke)

== C ==
- "Carlene" – Phil Vassar (Charlie Black, Rory Bourke)
- "Crazy Life" – Phil Vassar

== D ==
- "Dancin' with Dreams" – Phil Vassar (Charlie Black, Bobby Fischer)
- "Didn't You Know She's Gone" – Phil Vassar (Don Sampson)
- "Don't Speak" – Mindy McCready (Steve Mandile, Julie Wood)
- "Drive Away" – Sons of the Desert, Phil Vassar (Charlie Black)

== E ==
- "Erase" – Phil Vassar (Julie Wood)
- "Everywhere I Go" – Phil Vassar (Jeffrey Steele)

== F ==
- "For a Little While" – Tim McGraw (Steve Mandile, Jerry Vandiver)
- "For the First Time" – Kenny Chesney (Kenny Chesney)
- "Forgettin's So Long" – Phil Vassar (Robert Byrne)

== G ==
- "God Bless This Town" – Marshall Dyllon (Rory Bourke)
- "Gone by Dawn" –Jennifer Day, Phil Vassar (Julie Wood, Robert Byrne)
- "Good Ole Days" – Phil Vassar (Craig Wiseman)

== H ==
- "Here to Forget" – Phil Vassar (Billy Alcorn, Jeff Smith)
- "Houston" – Phil Vassar (Julie Vassar)

== I ==
- "I Miss the Innocence" – Phil Vassar (Julie Wood, Jeff Wood)
- "I Thought I Never Would Forget" – Phil Vassar (Tim Nichols)
- "I Was" – Neal McCoy (Charlie Black)
- "I Would" – Phil Vassar
- "I'll Be the One" – Phil Vassar (Julie Wood, Jeff Wood)
- "I'm Already Gone" – Diamond Rio, Phil Vassar (Annie Roboff)
- "I'm Alright" – Jo Dee Messina
- "In a Real Love" – Phil Vassar (Craig Wiseman)
- "Island Boy" – Kenny Chesney (Kenny Chesney, Mark Tamburino)
- "It's a Beautiful Life" – Kenny Rogers (Charlie Black, Jim Collins)
- "It's Only Love" – Phil Vassar (Rodney Clawson, Julie Wood)

== J ==
- "Joe & Rosalita" – Phil Vassar (Charlie Black)
- "Just Another Day in Paradise" – Phil Vassar (Craig Wiseman)
- " Just a Blur in the Rearview" (Robbin Thompson)

== L ==
- "Little Red Rodeo" – Collin Raye (Charlie Black, Rory Bourke)
- "Last Day of My Life" – Phil Vassar (Tim Ryan Rouillier)
- "Let Me Love You Tonight" – Phil Vassar (Jeffrey E. Smith, Julie Wood)
- "Like I Never Loved Before" – Phil Vassar (Robert Byrne)
- "Live It Up" – Marshall Dyllon (Robert Byrne)
- "Lucky as Me" – Phil Vassar (Robert Byrne)

== M ==
- "Mary Go 'Round" – Skip Ewing (Skip Ewing)
- "My Chevrolet" – Phil Vassar (Billy Alcorn, Tim Ryan Rouillier)
- "My Next Thirty Years" – Tim McGraw

== N ==
- "Nobody Knows Me Like You" – Phil Vassar (Julie Wood) Jeffrey Smith

== O ==
- "Once in a While" – Engelbert Humperdinck (Richard Williamson)

== P ==
- "Postmarked Birmingham" – Blackhawk (Don Sampson)
- "Prayer of a Common Man" – Phil Vassar (Tom Douglas)

== R ==
- "Right on the Money" – Alan Jackson (Charlie Black)
- "Rose Bouquet" – Phil Vassar (Robert Byrne)

== S ==
- "Six-Pack Summer" – Phil Vassar (Charlie Black, Tommy Rocco)
- "Someone You Love" – (Rob Thomas)
- "Somewhere In Between" – Phil Vassar (Julie Wood)
- Sound of a Million Dreams- David Nail (Scooter Carusoe)
- "Stand Still" – Phil Vassar (Connie Harrington, Julie Wood)

== T ==
- "That's When I Love You" – Phil Vassar (Julie Wood)
- "This Is God" – Phil Vassar
- "This Is My Life" – Phil Vassar (Tom Douglas)
- "This Is Where The End Starts" – Phil Vassar (Haley Vassar)
- "Time's Wastin'" – Phil Vassar (Fred Miles)
- "Twenty One" – Phil Vassar (Tim Nichols)

== U ==
- "Ultimate Love" – Phil Vassar (Rodney Clawson, Julie Wood)

== W ==
- "Why We Walk" - featured with the book Why We Walk
- "Wishing Well" – Jo Dee Messina, Jessica Andrews (Annie Roboff)
- "The Woman in My Life" – Phil Vassar (Julie Wood)
- "The World Is a Mess" – Phil Vassar (Tom Douglas)
- "Words Are Your Wheels" – various artists (Julie Wood)

== Y ==
- "Yeah Right" – Jennifer Day (Robert Byrne, Julie Wood)
