= Greatest Hits, Vol. 1 (Phil Vassar album) =

Greatest hits album by Phil Vassar
- Released: May 2, 2006; October 18, 2011 (re-release)
- Genre: Country
- Length: 56:29
- Label: Arista Nashville
- Producer: Various

Phil Vassar chronology
Shaken Not Stirred (2004)	Greatest Hits, Vol. 1 (2006)	Prayer of a Common Man (2008)

Singles from Greatest Hits, Vol. 1
- 1. "Last Day of My Life" Released: February 6, 2006; 2. "The Woman in My Life" Released: August 7, 2006

Professional ratings
Review scores
Source	Rating
AllMusic	4/5 stars

Greatest Hits, Vol. 1 is the first compilation album by American country music artist Phil Vassar, released on May 2, 2006. This was Vassar's most popular album, along with being his final album for Arista Nashville, it consists of songs from Vassar's first three records: 2000's Phil Vassar, 2002's American Child, and 2004's Shaken Not Stirred. Also included are his own versions of songs that he wrote for other country music artists before beginning his solo singing career: "Bye, Bye" and "I'm Alright" (previously recorded by Jo Dee Messina), "For a Little While" and "My Next Thirty Years" (previously recorded by Tim McGraw) and "Little Red Rodeo" (previously recorded by Collin Raye). Three newly recorded songs — "Twenty One", "Last Day of My Life", and "The Woman in My Life" — are also included on this compilation. The latter two were released as singles, peaking at #2 and #20, respectively, on the Billboard Hot Country Songs charts.

Greatest Hits, Vol. 1 was re-released in 2011 as Playlist: The Very Best of Phil Vassar. Both albums have an identical track listing.

== Track listing ==
No.	Title	Writer(s)	Length
1.	"Bye, Bye" (previously unreleased)	Rory Bourke, Phil Vassar	3:19
2.	"In a Real Love"	Craig Wiseman, Vassar	3:31
3.	"Carlene"	Vassar, Bourke, Charlie Black	4:25
4.	"I'm Alright" (previously unreleased)	Vassar	4:13
5.	"Last Day of My Life" (newly recorded)	Tim Ryan, Vassar	4:09
6.	"My Next Thirty Years" (previously unreleased)	Vassar	3:22
7.	"Little Red Rodeo" (previously unreleased)	Vassar, Bourke, Black	3:23
8.	"American Child"	Wiseman, Vassar	3:09
9.	"Twenty One" (newly recorded)	Tim Nichols, Vassar	3:58
10.	"Just Another Day in Paradise"	Vassar, Wiseman	3:54
11.	"For a Little While" (previously unreleased)	Steve Mandile, Jerry Vandiver, Vassar	4:31
12.	"The Woman in My Life" (newly recorded)	Vassar, Julie Wood	3:44
13.	"Six-Pack Summer"	Vassar, Black, Tommy Rocco	3:38
14.	"That's When I Love You"	Vassar, Wood	3:29
15.	"I'll Take That as a Yes (The Hot Tub Song)"	Jon McElroy, Vince Melamed	3:26
Total length:			56:29

== Personnel on New Tracks ==
- Jim "Moose" Brown - keyboards, Hammond organ
- Steven J. Caldwell - drums
- Chad Cromwell - drums
- Eric Darken - percussion
- Larry Franklin - fiddle
- David Grissom - acoustic guitar, electric guitar
- Aubrey Haynie - fiddle
- Russ Pahl - banjo, 12-string guitar, electric guitar, steel guitar
- Clayton Ryder - accordion, Hammond organ
- Jeff Smith - electric guitar, background vocals
- Bryan Sutton - acoustic guitar, mandolin
- Phil Vassar - piano, lead vocals, background vocals
- Glenn Worf - bass guitar

== Charts ==
=== Weekly charts ===
Chart (2006)	Peak position
US Billboard 200	10
US Top Country Albums (Billboard)	2

=== Year-end charts ===
Chart (2006)	Position
US Top Country Albums (Billboard)	39
