= List of songs written by Craig Wiseman =

This is an alphabetical list of songs written or co-written by the American songwriter Craig Wiseman.

Song (date), Writers – Artist

== 0-9 ==
- "1-800-Use to Be" – Lorrie Morgan (Dave Dunca)
- "100 Miles" – Blake Shelton (Chris Stapleton)
- "21 Summer" – John Osborne, T.J. Osborne (Jay Joyce)

== A ==
- "Ain't Skeered" – Kevin Denney (Anthony Smith)
- "Ain't Back Yet" – Kenny Chesney (Chris Tompkins)
- "All I Have to Offer You Is Love" – Dusty Springfield, Tanya Tucker
- "All I See Is You" – Dusty Springfield (Clive Westlake)
- "Amazing Grace" – Phil Vassar (Phil Vassar)
- "American Child" – Phil Vassar (Phil Vassar)
- "And the Crowd Goes Wild" – Mark Wills (Jeffrey Steele)
- "Anywhere USA" – Jason Michael Carroll (Brad Crisler)

== B ==
- "A Baby Changes Everything" – Faith Hill (Tim Nichols)
- "Back" – Neal McCoy (Ronnie Samoset)
- "Bang Bang Bang" – Nitty Gritty Dirt Band (Al Anderson)
- "Beautiful People" – Tim McGraw (Chris Lindsey)
- "Been There, Done That" – Ricky Van Shelton (John Jarrard)
- "Believe" – Brooks & Dunn (Ronnie Dunn)
- "Believer" – Brooks & Dunn (Ronnie Dunn)
- "Betty's Got a Bass Boat" – Pam Tillis (Bernie Nelson)
- "Between the Country and the Blues" – Jesse Hunter (Carlysle Johnson, Jesse Hunter)
- "A Bible and a Bus Ticket Home" – Collin Raye, Confederate Railroad
- "Black and Whites" – Phil Vassar (Phil Vassar)
- "Black Label, White Lies" – Confederate Railroad
- "Bobbi with an I" – Phil Vassar (Phil Vassar)
- "Boys 'Round Here" – Blake Shelton
- "Bring the Harvest Home" – Chris Knight (Chris Knight)
- "Bubba Hyde" – Diamond Rio (Gene Nelson)

== C ==
- "Calling Me" – Kenny Rogers with Don Henley (Annie Roboff)
- "Change" – Sons of the Desert (Mark Selby)
- "Chasin' You" – Morgan Wallen (Jamie Moore, Morgan Wallen)
- "Comfort Me" – Tim McGraw (Don Poythress)
- "Could Have Been Mine" – Crystal Bernard (Janie Lambert)
- "Cowboy Cadillac" – Confederate Railroad (Danny M. Wells)
- "The Cowboy in Me" – Tim McGraw (Jeffrey Steele, Al Anderson)

== D ==
- "Damn Right" – Terri Clark (Julian Gallagher)
- "Dangerous Man" – Trace Adkins (Brad Crisler)
- "A Day in the Life" – River Road (Gary Nicholson)
- "Deja Blue" – Billy Ray Cyrus (Donny Lowery)
- "Don't Love Make a Diamond Shine" – Tracy Byrd (Mike Dekle)
- "Dream You" – Pirates of the Mississippi (Jerry Phillips)

== E ==
- "Easy" – Shane Yellowbird (Jess Leary)
- "Elvis and Andy" – Confederate Railroad
- "Empty Arms Hotel" – Johnny Rodriguez (Ronnie Samoset)
- "Even the Jukebox Can't Forget" – Perfect Stranger (Trey Bruce)
- "Everywhere" – Tim McGraw (Mike Reid)

== F ==
- "Fall" – Suzy Bogguss (Trey Bruce)
- "Feels Like I'm Gettin' Into Something Good" – Chris LeDoux (Kent Blazy)
- "Finding My Way Back Home" – Lee Ann Womack (Chris Stapleton)
- "Forrest County Line" – 4 Runner (Al Anderson)

== G ==
- "Good Ole Days" – Phil Vassar (Phil Vassar)
- "The Good Stuff" – Kenny Chesney (Jim Collins)
- "The Greatest Love of 1998" – South 65 (Bob DiPiero, Tim Nichols)
- "Green" – Blake Shelton (George Teren)

== H ==
- ”Happy Hour” - Morgan Wallen (Corey Crowder, Michael Hardy)
- "Hard on the Ticker" – Tim McGraw (Gary Loyd)
- "Harder Cards" – Kenny Rogers (Mike Henderson)
- "He's a Cowboy" – Mark Wills (Danny Couch, P. J. Smith)
- "Heart Like a Hurricane" – Larry Stewart (Trey Bruce)
- "Heartbreak Shoes" – Ronna Reeves (Dave Gibson)
- "Hell Yeah" – Montgomery Gentry (Jeffrey Steele)
- "Her" – Aaron Tippin (Jeffrey Steele)
- "Hillbilly Deluxe" – Brooks & Dunn (Brad Crisler)
- "Hit It" – Toby Keith (Toby Keith)
- "Holdin'" – Diamond Rio (Kelly Garrett)
- "Hole in My Heart" – Jason Sellers (Al Anderson)
- "Home" – Tim McGraw (Tony Mullins)
- "Honky Tonk World" – Chris LeDoux (Paul Nelson)
- "How Do You Do What You Do So Well" – J. C. Jones (Benmont Tench)

== I ==
- "I Ain't Got You" – Marty Stuart (Trey Bruce)
- "I Can't Believe (You Let Her Go)" – Ricochet (Stephony Smith)
- "I Don't Want to Hang Out with Me" – Confederate Railroad (Chris Knight)
- "I Know the Way by Broken Heart" – Ricky Van Shelton (Ronnie Samoset)
- "I Love You Again" – John Anderson (John Anderson)
- "I Miss Her Missing Me" – Davis Daniel (Ronnie Samoset)
- "I Wasn't Ready for You" – Ricochet (Ronnie Samoset)
- "I Was Wrong" - Chris Stapleton (Chris Stapleton)
- "I'd Love to Love You" – Chad Brock (Jim Collins)
- "I'll Be Around" – Mark Wills (Tim Nichols)
- "I'm Diggin' It" – Confederate Railroad (Bob DiPiero)
- "I'm Goin' Back" – Trace Adkins (Catt Gravitt, Bobby Terry)
- "I'm in Love with a Capital 'U'" – Joe Diffie (Paul Nelson)
- "I'm Not the One" – Shelby Lynne (Kent Blazy)
- "I've Fallen in Love (And I Can't Get Up)" – Charlie Floyd (Ronnie Samoset)
- "If I Ain't Got You" – Trisha Yearwood (Trey Bruce)
- "If the Good Die Young" – Tracy Lawrence (Paul Nelson)
- "If This Is Love" – Deana Carter (Al Anderson)
- "If Your Heart Can't Do the Talking" – Holly Dunn (Lynn Langham)
- "In a Real Love" – Phil Vassar (Phil Vassar)
- "Is That Askin' Too Much" – Diamond Rio (Donny Lowrey)
- "It Ain't Easy Bein' Me" – Chris Knight (Chris Knight)
- "It Goes Something Like This" – Keith Harling (Al Anderson, Bob DiPiero)
- "It Was You" – Trace Adkins (Trey Bruce)
- "It's a Long Way Back" – John Anderson (John Anderson)

== J ==
- "Jesus & Gravity" – Dolly Parton (Betsy Ulmer)
- "Just Another Day in Paradise" – Phil Vassar (Phil Vassar)
- "Just Be Your Tear" – Tim McGraw (Tony Mullins)

== K ==
- "Keep On Rockin'" – Confederate Railroad (Al Anderson)

== L ==
- "Last Good Time" – Flynnville Train (Neal Coty)
- "The Last Thing on My Mind" – Patty Loveless (Al Anderson)
- "Leavin' Reasons" – Matthews, Wright & King (Kent Robbins)
- "Let Me Love You" – Lonestar (Dennis Matkosky)
- "Let the Guitar Do the Talkin'" – John Anderson (Kelly Garrett)
- "A Little Bit of America" – Daron Norwood
- "A Little Bit of You" – Jason McCoy (Sonny Burgess, Jason McCoy)
- "A Little Bit of You" – Lee Roy Parnell (Trey Bruce)
- "Live Like You Were Dying" – Tim McGraw (Tim Nichols)
- "Lonely Too Long" – Shenandoah (Al Anderson)
- "Long Way Down" – James Otto (C. Michael Spriggs)
- "Lost" – Aaron Tippin (Steve Seskin)
- "Love Is a Beautiful Thing" – Phil Vassar (Jeffrey Steele)
- "Love Me If You Can" – Toby Keith (Chris Wallin)
- "Love Story in the Making" – Linda Davis (Al Anderson)
- "Love Working on You" – John Michael Montgomery (Jim Collins)
- "Love You Back" – Rhett Akins (Bob DiPiero)

== M ==
- "Mama Raised Me Right" – Charlie Floyd (Ronnie Samoset)
- "The Man That I Am" – James Otto (Cory Mayo)
- "A Matter of Time" – Jason Sellers
- "Missing You" – Marcel (Marcel)
- "Move Over Madonna" – Confederate Railroad (Troy Seals)
- "My Hallelujah Song" – Julianne Hough (Steve McEwan)
- "My Old Friend" – Tim McGraw (Steve McEwan)
- "Music is Healing" – Florida Georgia Line

== N ==
- "Never Say Never" – Ty England (Al Anderson)
- "A Night in the Ground" – Trent Willmon
- "No Love Songs" – Chris Cagle (George Teren)
- "No More Looking over My Shoulder" – Travis Tritt (Michael Peterson)
- "Nobody Gonna Tell Me What to Do" – Van Zant (Tony Mullins, Tim Nichols)
- "Nothin' to Die For" – Tim McGraw (Lee Thomas Miller)
- "Nothing Compares to Loving You" – Aaron Tippin (Jeffrey Steele)
- "Nothing in Common but Love" – Twister Alley (Donny Lowery)
- "Nowhere Than Somewhere" – Flynnville Train (Brent Rodgers)

== O ==
- "One Day" – Drew Davis Band (Jeffrey Steele)
- "One Mississippi" – Jill King (Jess Leary)
- "One Tonight" – Chris LeDoux (Al Anderson)
- "The Only One" – Roy Orbison (Wesley Orbison)
- "Ordinary Love" – Shane Minor (Bob DiPiero, Dan Truman)
- "Ordinary People" – Clay Walker (Ed Hill)

== P ==
- "Party on the Patio" – Jolie & the Wanted (Jeffrey Steele)
- "The Perfect Love" – The Oak Ridge Boys (Troy Seals, Joe Williams)
- "Plan B" – Keith Anderson (Keith Anderson)
- "Price to Pay" – Randy Travis (Trey Bruce)

== R ==
- "Red Nekkid" – Flynnville Train (Tom Douglas)
- "Redneck Romeo" – The Forester Sisters (Dave Gibson)
- "Ride" – Trace Adkins (Peter Kvint)
- "Rough & Ready" – Trace Adkins (Brian White, Blair Mackichan)

== S ==
- "She Does" – Chad Brock (Chris Farren)
- "She Loved Me" – Jeffrey Steele (Jeffrey Steele)
- "She Treats Her Body Like a Temple" – Confederate Railroad (Rivers Rutherford)
- "She's Got It All" – Kenny Chesney (Drew Womack)
- "Shotgun" – Dallas Smith (Rodney Clawson)
- "Shoulda Woulda Coulda" - Beverley Knight
- "Somebody Said a Prayer" – Billy Ray Cyrus (Neil Thrasher)
- "Someone Else's Dream" – Faith Hill (Trey Bruce)
- "Somethin' 'bout a Sunday" – Michael Peterson (Tim Nichols)
- "Something's Gotta Give" – LeAnn Rimes (Trey Mullins)
- "Sometimes" - Black Stone Cherry
- "Sometimes You've Just Gotta Ride" – Chris LeDoux (Trey Bruce)
- "Stepping Stone" – Lari White (David Kent, Lari White)
- "Suite Natural Girl" – Jeffrey Steele (Kip Raines, Jeffrey Steele)
- "Summertime" – Kenny Chesney (Steve McEwan)
- "Sunday Morning and Saturday Night" – Confederate Railroad (Danny Shirley)
- "Superman" – Keith Urban (Keith Urban, Ben Berger, Ryan Rabin, Ryan McMahon)
- "Sweet Love" – Trisha Yearwood (Tia Sillers)
- "Sweet Natural Girl" – Emerson Drive (Kip Raines, Jeffrey Steele)

== T ==
- ”Talkin Tennessee” - Morgan Wallen (Jeff Hyde)
- "Tell Her" – Lonestar (Kwesi B.)
- "Tennessee Girl" – Sammy Kershaw (Bob DiPiero)
- "Tequila Sheila" – Flynnville Train (Scotty Emerick)
- "That Was Us" – Tracy Lawrence (Tony Lane)
- "That's What It's All About" – Brooks & Dunn (Steve McEwan)
- "That's What Loving You Means to Me" – Chris LeDoux (Al Anderson)
- "This Is Your Brain" – Joe Diffie (Kelly Garrett)
- "Thought It Was You" – Lonestar (Jim Collins)
- "Train" – Van Zant (Tony Mullins, Donnie Van Zant, Johnny Van Zant)
- "Try Getting over You" – Daron Norwood (Paul Nelson)
- "Two Badly Broken Hearts" – Sonya Isaacs (Sonya Isaacs)

== V ==
- "Voices" – Chris Young (Chris Tompkins, Chris Young)

== W ==
- "Waitin' in the Country" – Jason Michael Carroll (Cole Deggs)
- "Walkin' Away" – Diamond Rio (Annie Roboff)
- "Wasted Revenge" – Steve Forde (Jeffrey Steele)
- "Wasted Time" – Confederate Railroad (Danny Shirley)
- "Water and Bridges" – Collin Raye (Tim Nichols)
- "Way Back Texas" – Pat Green (Wendell Mobley)
- "We Talked" – Carolyn Dawn Johnson (Carolyn Dawn Johnson)
- "What I Want and What I Get" – Pirates of the Mississippi (Bill McCorvey, Troy Seals)
- "What Makes a Man" – Michael Peterson (Michael Peterson, Maia Sharp)
- "When I Come Back (I Wanna Be My Dog)" – Greg Holland (Al Anderson)
- "When Love Looks Back at You" – Hal Ketchum (Jess Leary)
- "When the Lights Go Down" – Faith Hill (Rivers Rutherford, Jeffrey Steele)
- "When We Get There" – Carter's Chord (Sarah Buxton)
- "When You Said You Loved Me" – Jeff Carson (Trey Bruce)
- "Where Did I Go So Right" – Jeff Carson (Jim Collins)
- "Where the Green Grass Grows" – Tim McGraw (Jess Leary)
- "Which Five Years" – Pam Tillis (Lisa Drew)
- "Who Invented the Wheel" – Trisha Yearwood (Anthony Smith, Bobby Terry)
- "Wish for You" – Faith Hill (Darrell Brown)
- "Without Your Love" – Aaron Tippin (Al Anderson)
- "The Woman with You" – Kenny Chesney (David Frasier)

== Y ==
- "You" – Neal McCoy (Thom McHugh)
- "You Ain't Doin' It Right" – Buddy Jewell (Tony Lane)
- "You Can't Say I Didn't Love You" – Aaron Pritchett (Trey Bruce)
- "You da Man" – Jameson Clark (Jameson Clark)
- "You Don't Know My Love" – Ronnie Milsap (Jim Collins)
- "You Owe Me" – Michelle Wright (Ronnie Samoset)
- "You Take Me Home" – LeAnn Rimes (Dennis Matkosky, LeAnn Rimes)
- "Young" – Kenny Chesney (Naoise Sheridan, Steve McEwan)

== Z ==
- "Zero" – Joe Diffie (Bob DiPiero)
