= Patriotic Country =

Patriotic Country is a series of three albums featuring American patriotic-themed country music. The series, which has sold over 400,000 copies, is part of Music For a Cause, a record label aiming to help raise awareness and funds for worthy charities. The Patriotic Country series benefits charities related to the Armed Forces such as the USO, Our Military Kids, and the Armed Forces YMCA.

== Patriotic Country ==
Released in 2004, Patriotic Country was the first CD released in the Patriotic Country Series. Track 4 on the first album was exclusive to the album. Proceeds from sales of the first album benefit the USO and several other military-related charities. Lee Greenwood and the Warren Brothers were the official spokesman for PC1.

Patriotic Country

Compilation album by Various artists
- Released: June 15, 2004
- Genre: Country music
- Length: 68:58
- Label: BMG Heritage; Music For a Cause

Patriotic Country
Review scores
| Source | Rating |
|---|---|
| Allmusic | link |
| The Village Voice | C− |

=== Track listing ===
1. "God Bless the USA" - Lee Greenwood (3:30)
2. "My Town" - Montgomery Gentry (4:26)
3. "Till My Dyin' Day" - Brooks & Dunn (3:06)
4. "God Bless America" - Martina McBride (3:31)
5. "Where the Stars and Stripes and the Eagle Fly" - Aaron Tippin (3:48)
6. "I'm Already There" - Lonestar (4:14)
7. "America Will Always Stand" - Randy Travis (3:58)
8. "American Child" - Phil Vassar (3:13)
9. "Back Where I Come From" - Kenny Chesney (4:11)
10. "Born Country" - Alabama (3:18)
11. "I'm Your Biggest Fan" - Neal McCoy (4:05)
12. "America Will Survive" - Hank Williams, Jr. (4:52)
13. "Days of America" - BlackHawk (3:00)
14. "This Ain't No Rag, It's a Flag" - Charlie Daniels Band (3:32)
15. "Hey Mr. President" - The Warren Brothers (4:17)
16. "Riding With Private Malone" - David Ball (4:34)
17. "One Last Time" - Dusty Drake (3:49)
18. "Homeland" - Kenny Rogers (3:34)

=== Charts ===
| Chart | Position |
|---|---|
| U.S. Billboard The Billboard 200 | 65 |
| U.S. Billboard Top Country Albums | 9 |
| U.S. Billboard Top Internet Albums | 65 |

== Patriotic Country 2 ==
The second album in the series, Patriotic Country 2, was released in 2005. A portion of the proceeds of this album benefits the Armed Services YMCA. For more than 140 years, ASYMCA has provided essential support services to the families of junior enlisted military service members & the individuals on the front lines defending nation. “Patriotic Country” was included in the ASYMCA “Send a CD to a Soldier” campaign. The CDs were included in Care Packages and distributed to the troops by the Armed Services YMCA. The gifts were given to a service-member randomly chosen by the Armed Services YMCA. Thoughtful gifts, reminders of home, and inspirational patriotic music are sure to lift the spirits of active-duty troops, making this program in line with Music For a Cause’s mission. Buddy Jewell and Chely Wright co-hosted a TV special on GAC that featured performances from Patriotic Country 2.

Patriotic Country 2
- http://www.PatrioticCountry2.com

Compilation album by Various artists
- Released: June 14, 2005
- Genre: Country music
- Length: 59:19
- Label: BMG Heritage; Music For a Cause

Patriotic Country 2
Review scores
| Source | Rating |
|---|---|
| Allmusic | link |

=== Track listing ===
1. "If the World Had a Front Porch" - Tracy Lawrence (3:06)
2. "You Do Your Thing" - Montgomery Gentry (3:42)
3. "Have You Forgotten?" - Darryl Worley (4:02)
4. "The Bumper of My SUV" - Chely Wright (4:40)
5. "A Country Boy Can Survive" - Hank Williams, Jr. (4:17)
6. "Living in the Promiseland" - Willie Nelson (3:21)
7. "Somebody's Someone" - Lonestar (4:19)
8. "This Is God" - Phil Vassar (3:32)
9. "Sweet Southern Comfort" - Buddy Jewell (3:31)
10. "You've Got to Stand for Something" - Aaron Tippin (3:02)
11. "Okie from Muskogee" - Merle Haggard (2:41)
12. "American Made" - The Oak Ridge Boys (2:39)
13. "Some Gave All" - Billy Ray Cyrus (4:06)
14. "Down Home" - Alabama (3:26)
15. "They Also Serve" - John Conlee (3:31)
16. "Ragged Old Flag" - Johnny Cash (3:09)
17. "America the Beautiful" (live) - Elvis Presley (2:15)

=== Charts ===
| Chart | Position |
|---|---|
| U.S. Billboard The Billboard 200 | 125 |
| U.S. Billboard Top Country Albums | 22 |
| U.S. Billboard Top Compilation Album | 6 |

== Patriotic Country 3 ==
The third album in the series, Patriotic Country 3, was released in 2008. Proceeds from this album benefited Our Military Kids.

Patriotic Country 3

Compilation album by Various artists
- Released: June 24, 2008
- Genre: Country music
- Length: 63:27
- Label: Razor & Tie; Music For a Cause

=== Track listing ===
1. "A Lot of Things Different" - Kenny Chesney (4:43)
2. "Letters from Home" - John Michael Montgomery (4:28)
3. "Blessed" - Martina McBride (4:36)
4. "My Front Porch Looking In" - Lonestar (3:32)
5. "Politically Uncorrect" - Gretchen Wilson and Merle Haggard (3:24)
6. "I'm from the Country" - Tracy Byrd (3:37)
7. "One More Day" - Diamond Rio (3:36)
8. "The Last of a Dying Breed" - Neal McCoy (3:03)
9. "The Long Arm of the Law" - Kenny Rogers (4:18)
10. "The Fightin' Side of Me" - Merle Haggard (2:51)
11. "Not Me" - Keni Thomas with Vince Gill and Emmylou Harris (4:01)
12. "God Bless America" - LeAnn Rimes (3:05)
13. "If I Don't Make It Back" - Tracy Lawrence (4:03)
14. "America" - Waylon Jennings (3:44)
15. "What Say You" - Travis Tritt and John Mellencamp (3:20)
16. "Everyday America" - Sugarland (3:52)
17. "Heroes and Friends" - Randy Travis (3:14)

=== Charts ===
| Chart | Position |
|---|---|
| U.S. Billboard The Billboard 200 | 162 |
| U.S. Billboard Top Compilation Album | 8 |
| U.S. Billboard Top Country Albums | 27 |
