= Say the Word =

Say the Word may refer to:

- "Say the Word" (Arcadia song), 1986
- "Say the Word" (Joel Feeney song), 1993
- "Say the Word" (Namie Amuro song), 2001
- "Say the Word", a song by DC Talk from Free at Last, 1992
- "Say the Word" (Doctors), a television episode, 2004
- "Say the Word" (The Walking Dead), a television episode, 2012

== See also ==
- "Say a Word", a song by Manuel Ortega, Austrian entry in the Eurovision Song Contest 2002
