= Everywhere I Go =

Everywhere I Go may refer to:

- "Everywhere I Go" (Amy Grant song)
- "Everywhere I Go" (Hollywood Undead song)
- "Everywhere I Go" (Phil Vassar song)
- "Everywhere I Go", a song by Jackson Browne from I'm Alive
- "Everywhere I Go", a song by The Call
- "Everywhere I Go", a song by Junior Kimbrough, covered by the Black Keys from Thickfreakness
- "Everywhere I Go", a song by Lissie from Catching a Tiger
- "Everywhere I Go", a song by The Muffs from The Muffs
- "Everywhere I Go", a song by Shawn Mullins
- "Everywhere I Go", a song by Willie Nelson from Teatro
- "Everywhere I Go (Kings & Queens)", a song by New Politics from Vikings
- "Everywhere I Go", a song by Caitlin Rose from The Stand-In
- "Everywhere I Go (Her Yerde Sen)", a Turkish drama series
