= Life Is Just a Dream =

"Life Is But a Dream"

Single by Joel Feeney

from the album ...Life Is but a Dream
- Released: 1995
- Genre: Country
- Length: 3:06
- Label: MCA
- Songwriters: Joel Feeney; Chris Farren
- Producers: Chris Farren; Hayward Parrott

Joel Feeney singles chronology
"What Kind of Man" (1995)	"Life Is But a Dream" (1995)	"A Little Bit of Your Love" (1998)

"Life Is But a Dream" is a song recorded by Canadian country music artist Joel Feeney. It was released in 1995 as the sixth single from his second studio album, ...Life Is but a Dream. The song peaked at number 9 on the RPM Country Tracks chart in November 1995.

== Chart performance ==
Chart (1995)	Peak position
Canada Country Singles (RPM)	9

=== Year-end charts ===
Chart (1995)	Position
Canada Country Tracks (RPM)	88
