= What Kind of Man =

What Kind of Man may refer to:

- "What Kind of Man" (Joel Feeney song)
- "What Kind of Man" (Florence and the Machine song)
- "What Kind of Man", by Jay Chou from the 2014 album Aiyo, Not Bad
