= Live It Up (Marshall Dyllon song) =

2000 song performed by Marshall Dyllon

Single by Marshall Dyllon

from the album Enjoy the Ride
- Released: September 30, 2000
- Genre: Country
- Length: 3:17
- Label: Dreamcatcher
- Songwriters: Phil Vassar, Robert Byrne
- Producers: Phil Vassar, Robert Byrne

Marshall Dyllon singles chronology
"Live It Up" (2000)	"You" (2001)

"Live It Up" is a debut song recorded by American country music group Marshall Dyllon. It was released in September 2000 as the first single from the album Enjoy the Ride. The song reached No. 37 on the Billboard Hot Country Singles & Tracks chart. The song was written and produced by Phil Vassar and Robert Byrne.

== Critical reception ==
A review in Billboard of the song was favorable, praising the "great uptempo melody, a solid performance, and a positive, well-written lyric".

== Personnel ==
- Robert Byrne - acoustic guitar
- Mike Durham - electric guitar
- Shannon Forrest - drums
- Paul Franklin - steel guitar
- Aubrey Haynie - fiddle
- Kevin Haynie - banjo
- Steve Nathan - piano, keyboards
- Chuck Tilley - percussion
- Glenn Worf - bass guitar

== Chart performance ==
Chart (2000–2001)	Peak position
Canada Country Singles (RPM)	46 (Note: "Live It Up" had not yet peaked when RPM ceased publication in November 2000.)
US Hot Country Songs (Billboard)	37
