= Prayer of a Common Man =

Studio album by Phil Vassar
- Released: April 22, 2008
- Studios: Firehouse Recording Studios (Pasadena, California); House of Gain, Starstruck Studios, Little Big Studio, The Tin Ear and Short Elvis Studio (Nashville, Tennessee); Sound Kitchen (Franklin, Tennessee)
- Genre: Country
- Length: 43:30
- Label: Universal South
- Producers: Phil Vassar Mark Wright

Phil Vassar chronology
Greatest Hits, Vol. 1 (2006)	Prayer of a Common Man (2008)	Traveling Circus (2009)

Singles from Prayer of a Common Man
- 1. "This Is My Life" Released: June 9, 2007; 2. "Love Is a Beautiful Thing" Released: October 30, 2007; 3. "I Would" Released: July 14, 2008; 4. "Prayer of a Common Man" Released: January 2009

Professional ratings
Review scores
Source	Rating
About.com	link
AllMusic	link
Chicago Tribune	positive link
Country HQ	favorable link
The New York Times	average link
USA Today	link

Prayer of a Common Man is the fourth studio album by American country music artist Phil Vassar. It was released on April 22, 2008, on Universal South Records. The album has produced two singles for Vassar on the Billboard Hot Country Songs charts: "This Is My Life" (#35) and "Love Is a Beautiful Thing" (#2). The latter song was originally a Top 40 country hit for Canadian country singer Paul Brandt, whose version of the song was entitled "It's a Beautiful Thing". "I Would" was released in July 2008 as the third single and peaked at #26 in the fall of 2008. The title song from the album was released as the fourth single in March 2009, but only peaked at #53, thus becoming his first single to miss the top 40 since 2003's "Ultimate Love", which was a #41 hit.

The album debuted at number ten on the U.S. Billboard 200 chart, selling about 27,000 copies in its first week.

== Track listing ==
No.	Title	Writer(s)	Length
1.	"This Is My Life"	Phil Vassar, Tom Douglas	3:38
2.	"Around Here Somewhere"	Vassar, Charlie Black, Tommy Rocco	3:27
3.	"My Chevrolet"	Vassar, Timmy Alcorn, Tim Ryan	4:14
4.	"Love Is a Beautiful Thing"	Jeffrey Steele, Craig Wiseman	3:58
5.	"Prayer of a Common Man"	Vassar, Douglas	3:22
6.	"I Would"	Vassar	3:40
7.	"Why Don't Ya" (featuring Los Lonely Boys)	Max Baca, Shawn Sahm, Speedy Sparks	2:47
8.	"It's Only Love"	Rodney Clawson, Vassar, Julie Wood	3:53
9.	"Let Me Love You Tonight"	Jeffrey E. Smith, Vassar, Wood	3:49
10.	"Baby Rocks"	Vassar, Smith, Alcorn	3:36
11.	"The World Is a Mess"	Vassar, Douglas	3:28
12.	"Crazy Life"	Vassar	3:38
Total length:			43:30

== Chart performance ==
Chart (2008)	Peak position
U.S. Billboard Top Country Albums	3
U.S. Billboard 200	10
