= Good Ole Days =

Single by Phil Vassar

from the album Shaken Not Stirred
- Released: June 25, 2005
- Genre: Country
- Length: 3:04
- Label: Arista Nashville
- Songwriter(s): Phil Vassar, Craig Wiseman
- Producer(s): Frank Rogers, Phil Vassar

Phil Vassar singles chronology
"I'll Take That as a Yes (The Hot Tub Song)" (2004)	"Good Ole Days" (2005)	"Last Day of My Life" (2006)

"Good Ole Days" is a song co-written and recorded by American country music artist Phil Vassar. It was released in June 2005 as the third single from the album Shaken Not Stirred. The song reached #22 on the Billboard Hot Country Songs chart. The song was written by Vassar and Craig Wiseman.

== Chart performance ==
Chart (2005)	Peak position
US Hot Country Songs (Billboard)	22
