= Durham Fair =

Agricultural fair in Durham, Connecticut

Coordinates: 41.4777°N 72.6814°W

A two-horse pulling contest at the 89th annual Durham Fair on September 28, 2008

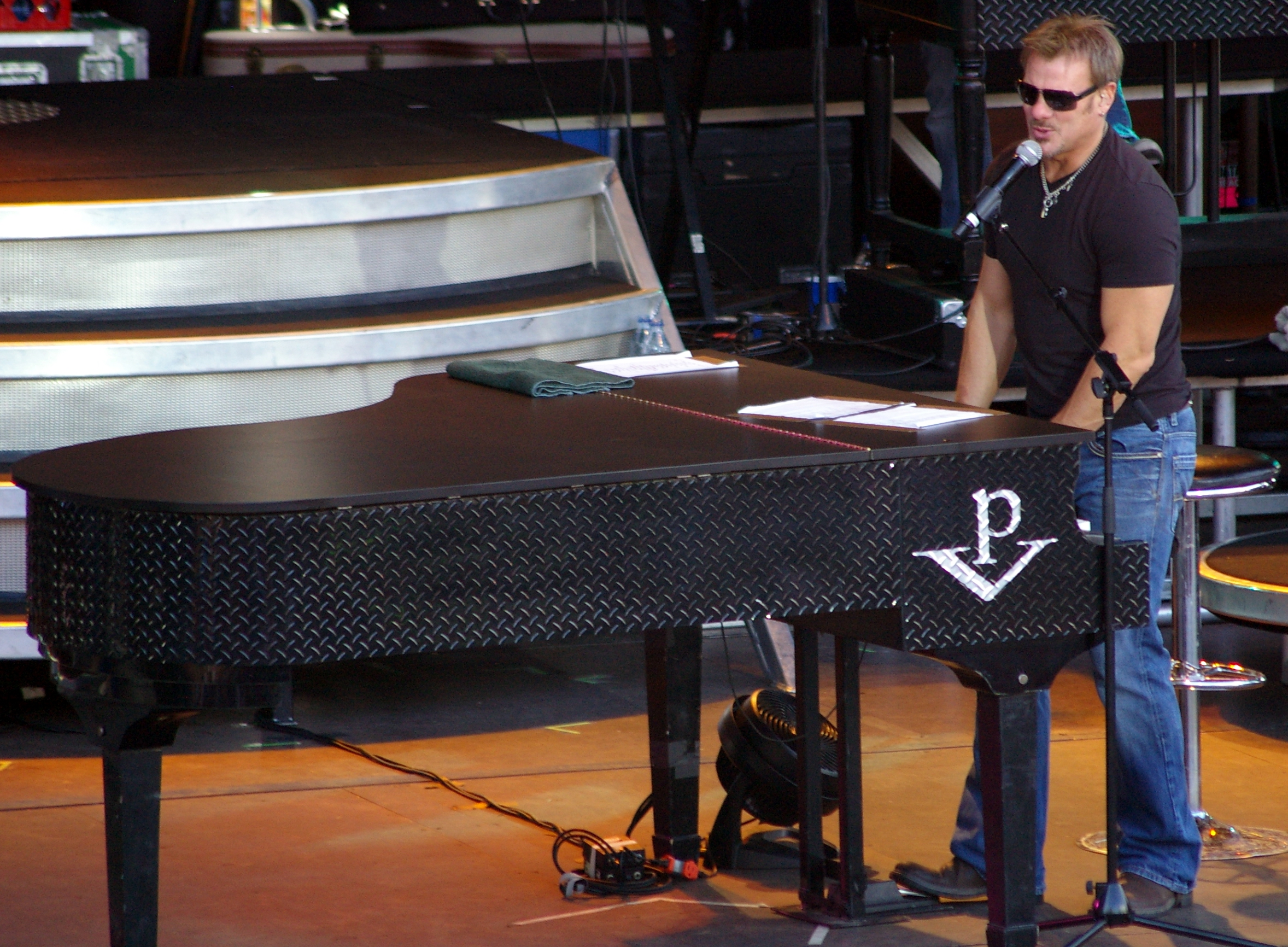
Country music artist Phil Vassar gives a performance at the 2008 fair

The Durham Fair, held in Durham, Connecticut, is the largest agricultural fairs in New England and was first held in 1916. The four-day event takes place during the last full weekend of September. Activities include livestock and competitive exhibits, pulling contests, craft and commercial tents, various forms of entertainment and a carnival midway. The fairgrounds accommodate both permanent buildings for commercial and agricultural exhibits and space for tents and other non-permanent structures to be brought in each year. Past entertainers on the main stage have included Blake Shelton, Pat Benatar, Justin Moore, George Jones, SHeDAISY, Bill Monroe, Loretta Lynn, 38 Special, Charlie Daniels, Phil Vassar, The Guess Who, REO Speedwagon, Foreigner, Blues Traveler, and KC and the Sunshine Band.

The Durham Fair is staffed entirely by volunteers; in fact, it is the second largest fair in North America without paid management or employees. In addition to the members of the Durham Agricultural Fair Association and other volunteers, local organizations such as schools, churches, clubs, civic groups, and more, participate in the fair to help raise funds for their organizations.

There was no fair in 1917–18, 1942–45 & 2020.

== Pulling contests ==
Pulling contests are events that involve the use of oxen, draft horses and tractors to pull concrete weights to determine the best contestant in each event. They are well received as a show of strength between farmers who believe that their oxen, horses or tractors are the strongest in terms of pulling weight. Monetary awards provide additional motivation for all competitors.

== Use of Durham Fairgrounds ==
The Durham Fairgrounds have been used for several other festivals including B.O.M.B. Fest 2010.

In May 2012, the fairgrounds hosted the 1st annual Construction Pro RODEO featuring an EXPO, careers in construction day for high school kids and a skills competition.
