= She Ain't Gonna Cry =

Single by Joel Feeney

from the album Joel Feeney
- Released: 1999
- Genre: Country
- Length: 5:16
- Label: Universal Music Canada
- Songwriters: Joel Feeney; Chris Farren
- Producer: Chris Farren

Joel Feeney singles chronology
"Leslie's Wedding Day" (1998)	"She Ain't Gonna Cry" (1999)	"A Wonderful Life" (2000)

"She Ain't Gonna Cry" is a song recorded by Canadian country music artist Joel Feeney. It was released in 1999 as the third single from his third studio album, Joel Feeney. It peaked at number 15 on the RPM Country Tracks chart in August 1999.

The song was covered by American country music group Marshall Dyllon and released as a single in 2001. It peaked at number 44 on the Billboard Hot Country Singles & Tracks chart.

== Chart performance ==
Chart (1999)	Peak position
Canada Country Singles (RPM)	15

=== Year-end charts ===
Chart (1999)	Position
Canada Country Tracks (RPM)	100
