= Traveling Circus =

Studio album by Phil Vassar
- Released: December 15, 2009
- Recorded: 2009
- Genre: Country
- Length: 43:46
- Label: Universal South
- Producer: Phil Vassar

Phil Vassar chronology
Prayer of a Common Man (2008)	Traveling Circus (2009)	Noel (2011)

Singles from Traveling Circus
- 1. "Bobbi with an I" Released: June 15, 2009; 2. "Everywhere I Go" Released: September 8, 2009

Traveling Circus is the fifth studio album by American country music singer Phil Vassar. It was released on December 15, 2009, as his second album for the Universal South Records label. The album contains the singles "Bobbi with an I" and "Everywhere I Go," both of which have charted on the U.S. country singles charts. Vassar produced the album on his own, and wrote or co-wrote every song on it as well.

== Content ==
The album's first single was "Bobbi with an I," a song about a cross-dressing man, which peaked at #46 on the Billboard Hot Country Songs charts. Following it was the ballad "Everywhere I Go," which peaked at #36 in late 2009.

Vassar wrote or co-wrote every song on the album, collaborating with Nashville songwriters such as Jeffrey Steele, Craig Wiseman and Tim Nichols, as well as singer Kenny Chesney on the track "I Will Remember You." Vassar produced the album himself, and used his road band on it. His high school art teacher, Jason Erwin, painted the album cover, and a young director named Chris Cella directed the music video for "Everywhere I Go."

The album was originally slated for a February 2010 release, but in November 2009, it was announced that the release date would be moved to December 15, 2009. It is Vassar's second release on the Universal South Records label, following 2008's Prayer of a Common Man.

== Critical reception ==
=== Album ===
Professional ratings
Review scores
Source	Rating
AllMusic	3/5 stars
Billboard	(60/100)
The New York Times	(positive)
USA Today	2/4 stars

Stephen Thomas Erlewine of AllMusic gave the album three stars out of five, citing the up-tempo songs as standouts: "Unfortunately, Vassar leans a little too heavily on placid power ballads to give this a truly carnivalesque kick, but when he does take the time to lay back he’s as good as he ever was."

== Track listing ==
All tracks are written by Phil Vassar, with additional co-writers as noted.

No.	Title	Writer(s)	Length
1.	"Life"		3:34
2.	"Lemonade"	Charlie Black; Tim Ryan	3:34
3.	"Everywhere I Go"	Jeffrey Steele	4:17
4.	"John Wayne"	Tom Douglas	4:10
5.	"Tequila Town"	Kelley Lovelace	4:00
6.	"Bobbi with an I"	Craig Wiseman	4:38
7.	"She's On Her Way"	Jeff Outlaw; Tim Nichols	3:57
8.	"A Year from Now"	Wiseman	4:17
9.	"Save Tonight for Me"	Ryan; Juliana Cole	3:59
10.	"I Will Remember You"	Kenny Chesney	3:57
11.	"Where Have All the Pianos Gone"	James T. Slater	3:23
Total length:			43:46

== Personnel ==
- Phil Vassar – vocals, acoustic piano
- Jason Fausset – keyboards
- Scott Saunders – keyboards, Hammond B3 organ
- Tim Ryan – acoustic guitar
- Jeff Smith – acoustic guitar, baritone guitar, electric guitars, backing vocals
- Russ Pahl – acoustic guitar, electric guitars, steel guitar, banjo, six-string bass
- Larry Beaird – banjo
- Pete Sternberg – bass
- Seth Rausch – drums, percussion
- Jason Fitz – fiddle, mandolin, strings
- Craig Wiseman – backing vocals

Handclaps

- Blair Mingus
- Greg Rausch
- Norb Rausch
- Seth Rausch

== Chart performance ==
Chart (2009)	Peak position
U.S. Billboard Top Country Albums	29
U.S. Billboard 200	198
