= I Would =

Single by Phil Vassar

from the album Prayer of a Common Man
- Released: July 14, 2008
- Genre: Country
- Length: 3:40
- Label: Universal South
- Songwriter(s): Phil Vassar
- Producer(s): Phil Vassar, Mark Wright

Phil Vassar singles chronology
"Love Is a Beautiful Thing" (2007)	"I Would" (2008)	"Prayer of a Common Man" (2009)

"I Would" is a song written and recorded by American country music artist Phil Vassar. It was released in July 2008 as the third single from the album Prayer of a Common Man. The song reached #26 on the Billboard Hot Country Songs chart.

== Chart performance ==
Chart (2008)	Peak position
US Hot Country Songs (Billboard)	26
