= Enjoy the Ride (Marshall Dyllon album) =

Studio album by Marshall Dyllon
- Released: December 5, 2000
- Genre: Country
- Label: Dreamcatcher
- Producer: Various

Enjoy the Ride is the only studio album by American country music group Marshall Dyllon. It was released on December 5, 2000 via Dreamcatcher Records, a label owned by Kenny Rogers. It produced two singles in "Live It Up" and "You", both of which charted on the Billboard country charts in 2000.

== Track listing ==
1. "God Bless This Town" (Rory Bourke, Phil Vassar) - 3:30
  - Producer: Phil Vassar, Robert Byrne
2. "All I Wanna Do" (Ron Harbin, Richie McDonald, Anthony L. Smith) - 4:00
  - Producer: Michael D. Clute
3. "She's Like a Child" (Matt Morris) - 3:13
  - Producer: John Guess, Joe Chemay
4. "Live It Up" (Robert Byrne, Vassar) - 3:17
  - Producer: Phil Vassar, Robert Byrne
5. "You" (Jimmy Olander, Will Robinson, Aaron Sain) - 3:47
  - Producer: John Guess, Joe Chemay
6. "Closer to Heaven" (Bob DeMarco, Michael Egizi, Kenny Rogers Jr.) - 3:49
  - Producer: Bob DeMarco, Michael Egizi, Kenny Rogers Jr. for Planet One Productions
7. "Is She Gone" (Todd Michael Sansom) - 3:51
  - Producer: John Guess, Joe Chemay
8. "I'll Never Miss That Girl" (Reed Nielsen, Jeffrey Steele) - 4:07
  - Producer: Chris Farren
9. "We Got Love" (DeMarco, Egizi, Rogers Jr.) - 4:41
  - Producer: Bob DeMarco, Michael Egizi, Kenny Rogers Jr. for Planet One Productions
10. "Special Girl" (Sansom) - 3:34
  - Producer: Michael D. Clute
11. "So Bad" (Craig Bickhardt, Kip Lennon, Michael Lennon, Jack Sundrud) - 4:05
  - Producer: Brent Maher for Maher Productions
12. "Enjoy the Ride" (Sansom) - 3:27
  - Producer: Chris Farren

== Personnel ==
Compiled from liner notes.

=== Marshall Dyllon ===
- Daniel Cahoon - vocals
- Jesse Littleton - vocals
- Michael Martin - vocals
- Paul Martin - vocals
- Todd Michael Sansom - vocals, vocal arrangements

=== Additional musicians ===
- Eddie Bayers - drums
- Larry Beaird - acoustic guitar
- Craig Bickhardt - acoustic guitar
- Robert Byrne - acoustic guitar
- Larry Byrom - acoustic guitar
- Spencer Campbell - bass guitar
- Jimmy Carter - bass guitar
- Joe Chemay - bass guitar
- Bob DeMarco - electric guitar
- Dan Dugmore - steel guitar
- Mike Durham – electric guitar
- Michael Egizi - keyboards
- Pat Flynn - acoustic guitar
- Shannon Forrest - drums
- Larry Franklin - fiddle, mandolin
- Paul Franklin - pedal steel guitar
- Sonny Garrish - pedal steel guitar
- Tony Harrell - piano, Hammond B-3
- Aubrey Haynie - fiddle
- Kevin Haynie - banjo
- Jeff King - electric guitar
- Paul Leim - drums, percussion
- Doug Livingston - pedal steel guitar
- B. James Lowry - acoustic guitar
- Brent Mason - electric guitar
- Jerry McPherson - electric guitar
- Steve Nathan - piano, keyboard, organ
- Bobby Ogdin - keyboards
- Russ Pahl - pedal steel guitar, Dobro, banjo
- Kenny Rogers, Jr. - acoustic guitar
- Matt Rollings - piano
- Mark Selby - acoustic guitar
- Chuck Tilley - percussion
- Ilya Toshinsky - electric guitar
- Biff Watson - acoustic guitar
- Glenn Worf - bass guitar
