= Marshall Dyllon =

American country music group

- Origin: San Antonio, Texas, U.S.
- Genres: Country
- Years active: 2000–2001
- Labels: Dreamcatcher
- Past members: Daniel Cahoon; Jesse Littleton; Michael Martin; Paul Martin; Todd Michael Sansom

Marshall Dyllon was an American country music group formed in 2000, comprising vocalists Daniel Cahoon, Jesse Littleton, Michael Martin, Paul Martin, and Todd Michael Sansom. These five members were recruited by country music artist Kenny Rogers and talent manager Lou Pearlman, in an attempt to bring the boy band sound to the country music scene.

Excluding Kenny Rogers himself, Marshall Dyllon was the first act to be signed to Dreamcatcher Records, an independent label which Rogers owned. The group's singular album, Enjoy the Ride, was released that year. It accounted for the chart singles "Live It Up" and "You". The band released a third single, "She Ain't Gonna Cry", in 2001 before disbanding.

== Biography ==
Lou Pearlman, the talent manager responsible for the Backstreet Boys and 'N Sync, teamed up with country music artist Kenny Rogers to create the lineup of Marshall Dyllon as an attempt to bring the then-popular boy band sound to the country music scene. Rogers and Lou found Paul Martin, Michael Martin (Paul's younger brother), Dan Cahoon, Todd Sansom, and Jesse Littleton. Paul Martin and Jesse Littleton had previously auditioned on the ABC television series Making the Band, where both were offered opportunities to become members of what eventually became O-Town, another boy band.

Eventually, the group decided to assume the name Marshall Dyllon, an altered spelling of the character Marshal Matt Dillon from the television series Gunsmoke. All five members alternated as lead vocalists, while Sansom co-wrote several of the songs and handled the vocal arrangements. Marshall Dyllon opened for Rogers and several other prominent country music personalities. On December 5, 2000, Marshall Dyllon released their first album, entitled Enjoy the Ride. The album included songs co-written by Phil Vassar, who had written several country songs for other artists and was just beginning his career as a successful country music artist. Overall, Enjoy the Ride produced two singles on the U.S. Billboard country singles charts. An additional single, "She Ain't Gonna Cry", which was previously recorded by its co-writer Joel Feeney, was issued before Marshall Dyllon was disbanded in 2001.

Littleton later recorded for Hollywood Records in 2006 under the name Gran Bel Fisher.

== Discography ==
=== Albums ===
Title	Album details
Enjoy the Ride	Release date: December 5, 2000; Label: Dreamcatcher Records

=== Singles ===
Year	Single	Peak positions	Album
Year	Single	US Country	Album
2000	"Live It Up"	37	Enjoy the Ride
2001	"You"	47	Enjoy the Ride
2001	"She Ain't Gonna Cry"	44	single only

=== Music videos ===
Year	Video
2000	"Live It Up"
2001	"You"
