= Music for a Cause =

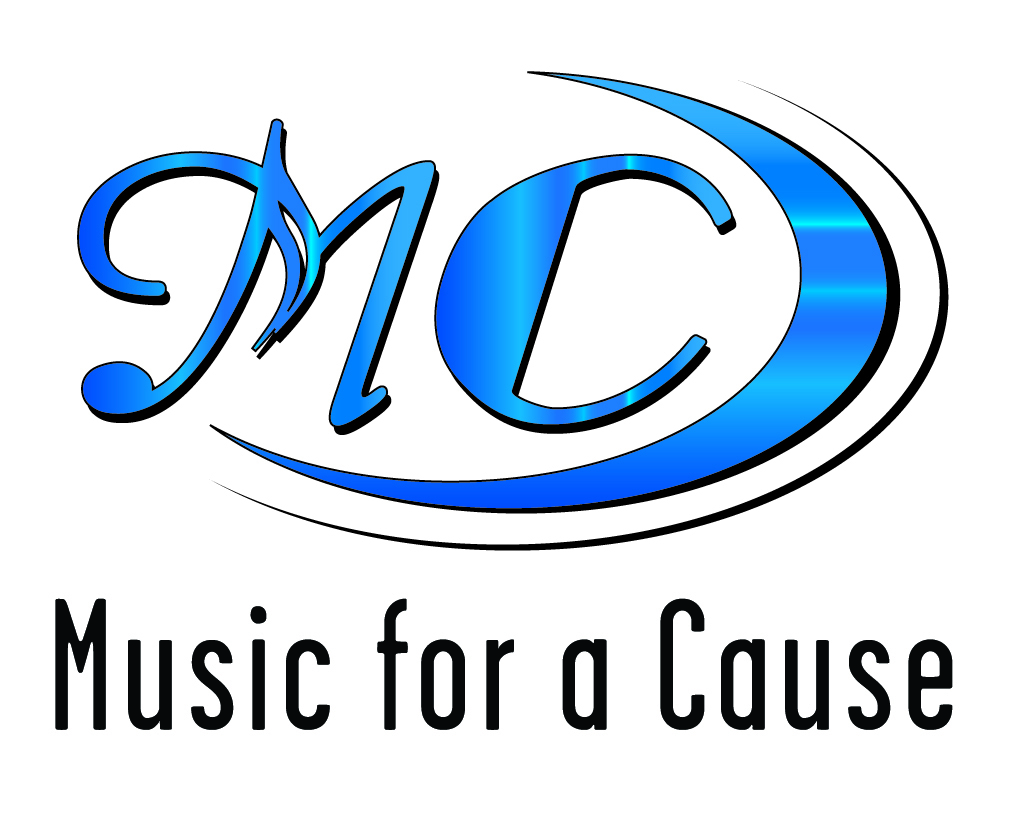
- Founded: 2003
- Distributor(s): BMG; Sony BMG; EMI; Sony; Universal; Razor & Tie; Disney Records; American Broadcasting Company; Country Music Television; Great American Country
- Genre: Various
- Country of origin: United States
- Location: New York, NY; Los Angeles, CA; Micanopy, FL; Nashville, TN
- Official website: www.primeventuresinc.com www.patrioticcountry.com www.patrioticcountry2.com vimeo.com/25083113

Music For a Cause is a record label, founded in 2003, and operating in Los Angeles, Nashville, New York, and Micanopy, FL. It is a subsidiary of Prime Ventures, Inc. Using the power of song, they help to raise awareness and funds for worthy charities. By combining philanthropy with entertainment, they provide a benefit to both those in need and those who contribute. Music for a Cause is an example of the new and successful trend called social entrepreneurship, in which for-profit companies partner with non-profits to harness the power of the marketplace to help accomplish charitable goals.

The Music for a Cause catalog includes the Patriotic Country series which has sold over 400,000 copies. This chart-topping compilation series of three albums (including three “top ten” Billboard releases) features American patriotic-themed country music. The series reached a status of #1 selling CD on Amazon.com, and garnered positive press in USA Today, Fox, CNN, ESPN, Armed Forces Radio, Country Weekly, GAC, CMT, and many other outlets.

Music for a Cause has worked with top artists such as Janet Jackson, Snoop Dogg, Toby Keith, Kenny Chesney, Sugarland, Carrie Underwood, Jessica Simpson, Martina McBride, Randy Travis, Alabama, Hank Williams Jr, Charlie Daniels Band, Kenny Rogers, Willie Nelson, Merle Haggard, Vince Gill, Emmylou Harris, LeAnn Rimes, John Mellencamp, Brooks & Dunn, Rascal Flatts, Tim McGraw, Alan Jackson, Eric Church, Luke Bryan, Trace Adkins, Lee Greenwood and many others.

In line with the Music for a Cause mission, a portion of the proceeds from sales of these albums benefit the USO, the Armed Services YMCA, and Our Military Kids.

Music for a Cause worked with Universal, Sony and EMI on an installment of the world’s most successful compilation brand, the Now That's What I Call Music! series (this collaboration produced a #7 charting Billboard album).

In 2011, Music for a Cause worked with Disney Records to release and album for multi-platinum recording artist, Billy Ray Cyrus called I'm American.

== Television production ==
Music for a Cause has produced television content and prime-time specials for network and cable TV including on ABC, CMT, and GAC. Specials have included America United: In Support of Our Troops, a prime-time special that received over 4 million viewers and featured Janet Jackson, Toby Keith, Jessica Simpson, Snoop Dogg, Pamela Anderson, ZZ Top, Clint Black, Joe Nichols, Carlos Mencia, Jordin Sparks, Rickey Minor, Kathy Griffin, Ne-Yo, D. L. Hughley, Ali Landry, Holly Madison, Bridget Marquardt, Kendra Wilkinson, and more. Music for a Cause also produced the Patriotic Country show on GAC and the Billy Ray Cyrus: I'm American. TV specials.

== Partnerships / Distributors / Strategic alliances ==
Music for a Cause has partnered or strategically aligned with numerous major record labels, including BMG, Sony BMG, EMI, Sony, Universal, Disney Records, and Razor & Tie.

== Music releases ==
NOW USA: Patriotic Country Collection CD cover

Music For a Cause's debut release Patriotic Country reached #9 on Billboard's "Top Country Albums" Chart. The follow-up album Patriotic Country 2 peaked at #6 on the "Top Compilation Albums" Billboard Chart, and Patriotic Country 3 reached #8 on "Top Compilation Albums". NOW That's What I Call the USA: The Patriotic Country Collection reached #7 on Billboard's "Top Country Albums" Chart.

- Patriotic Country (2004)
- Patriotic Country2 (2005)
- Patriotic Country3 (2008)
- NOW USA: Patriotic Country Collection (2010)
- I'm American Billy Ray Cyrus (2011)

== Philanthropy ==
Music For a Cause is dedicated to raising funds and awareness for worthy charities through the power of song. A portion of the proceeds were donated to the following charities from the Patriotic Country Series and NOW That's What I Call the USA: The Patriotic Country Collection.

=== USO ===
The USO is a private, nonprofit organization whose mission is to support the troops by providing morale, welfare and recreation-type services to our men and women in uniform.

=== Armed Services YMCA ===
For more than 140 years, ASYMCA has provided essential support services to the families of junior enlisted military service members & the individuals on the front lines defending nation.

==== Send a CD to a Soldier ====
Patriotic Country was included in the ASYMCA “Send a CD to a Soldier” campaign. The CDs were included in Care Packages and distributed to the troops by the Armed Services YMCA. The gifts were given to a service-member randomly chosen by the Armed Services YMCA. Thoughtful gifts, reminders of home, and inspirational patriotic music are sure to lift the spirits of active-duty troops, making this program in line with Music For a Cause’s mission.

=== Our Military Kids ===
Our Military Kids provides tangible support to the children of deployed and severely injured National Guard and Military Reserve personnel through grants for enrichment activities and tutoring. These activities nurture and sustain the children during the time a parent is away in service to our country.

=== Special Operations Warrior Foundation ===
For 30 years, the top-rated Special Operations Warrior Foundation has provided support to the families of fallen and wounded Army, Navy, Air Force and Marine Corps special operations personnel. The foundation has two primary programs: College scholarships for children of fallen special operations troops and immediate financial assistance for families of severely wounded special operations personnel.

=== Wounded Warrior Project ===
The mission of the Wounded Warrior Project is to honor and empower wounded warriors. Its purpose is to raise awareness and to enlist the public's aid for the needs of severely injured service members, to help severely injured men and women aid and assist each other, and to provide unique, direct programs and services to meet their needs. WWP is a national, nonpartisan organization headquartered in Jacksonville, FL.

== Celebrity Comments ==
Many artists feel especially proud to partake in Music For a Cause's mission and projects.

"This is my tip of the hat to our military…my way of giving back and saying thank you to them for the gift of freedom they have given to this great country." - Billy Ray Cyrus

"I am proud to be a part of Patriotic Country™, along with all the other outstanding artists on this CD. Supporting Patriotic Country™ is a way to show the brave men and women, fighting to protect our nation, how much we appreciate their incredible service. As Americans, we all have a duty to celebrate the freedom, courage and compassion that makes this country great and the Patriotic Country™ CD is a way to express my deep thanks." - Lee Greenwood

“We are all blessed to live where we do and I’m glad to have “I’m From the Country” be a part of this project. God bless our military, their families who sacrifice so much and the USA,” - Platinum-Selling Country Star Tracy Byrd

“We are proud to have a #1 hit with this song, ‘My Front Porch Looking In’, which is a song about the most important thing in life – family. Our Lonestar family supports and salutes our military for their many sacrifices.” - Lonestar's Dan Sams

“We are so blessed in America. Here’s a nice way to say thank you to the people who guarantee our freedom, and to remember the enormous sacrifices their families make.” - Aaron Tippin

“I feel so strongly about this. We have to do everything we can to support the families of our men and women in uniform.” - John Conlee
