= A Little Bit of Your Love =

Single by Joel Feeney

from the album Joel Feeney
- Released: 1998
- Genre: Country
- Length: 3:46
- Label: Universal Music Canada
- Songwriters: Joel Feeney; Chris Farren
- Producer: Chris Farren

Joel Feeney singles chronology
"Life Is Just a Dream" (1995)	"A Little Bit of Your Love" (1998)	"Leslie's Wedding Day" (1998)

"A Little Bit of Your Love" is a song recorded by Canadian country music artist Joel Feeney. It was released in 1998 as the first single from his third studio album, Joel Feeney. It peaked at number 12 on the RPM Country Tracks chart in November 1998.

== Chart performance ==
Chart (1998)	Peak position
Canada Country Singles (RPM)	12

=== Year-end charts ===
Chart (1998)	Position
Canada Country Tracks (RPM)	13
