= What Kind of Man (Joel Feeney song) =

Single by Joel Feeney

from the album ...Life Is but a Dream
- Released: 1995
- Genre: Country
- Length: 4:59
- Label: MCA
- Songwriters: Joel Feeney; Chris Farren
- Producers: Chris Farren; Hayward Parrott

Joel Feeney singles chronology
"Tears Don't Lie" (1994)	"What Kind of Man" (1995)	"Life Is Just a Dream" (1995)

"What Kind of Man" is a single by Canadian country music artist Joel Feeney. Released in 1995, it was the fifth single from his album ...Life Is but a Dream. The song reached #1 on the RPM Country Tracks chart in May 1995.

== Charts ==
=== Weekly charts ===
Chart (1995)	Peak position
Canada Country Singles (RPM)	1

=== Year-end charts ===
Chart (1995)	Position
Canada Country Tracks (RPM)	45
