= Charlie Floyd =

American country music singer

- Origin: Aynor, South Carolina, United States
- Genres: Country
- Occupation: Singer-songwriter
- Instrument(s): Vocals, Guitar
- Years active: 198x-present?
- Labels: Liberty

Charlie Floyd (born in Aynor, South Carolina) is an American country music singer. Floyd performed in his native South Carolina for several years, and opened a nightclub called Charlie's Nite Life in Myrtle Beach, South Carolina. In 1993, he signed to Liberty Records and released his debut album, also titled Charlie's Nite Life. Alanna Nash of Entertainment Weekly gave Floyd's album a B rating, saying that Floyd had "the gruff voice of a '70s Southern rocker but his songs belie his tough-guy sound." The album produced two chart singles in "I've Fallen in Love (And I Can't Get Up)" and "Good Girls Go to Heaven". After the album's release, Floyd closed the nightclub, but reopened it in 1998.

== Discography ==
=== Albums ===
Title	Album details
Charlie's Nite Life	Release date: October 5, 1993; Label: Liberty Records
Sounds of Home	Release date: May 7, 2010; Label: Country Boy Records

=== Singles ===
Year	Single	Peak positions	Album
Year	Single	US Country	Album
1993	"I've Fallen in Love (And I Can't Get Up)"	75	Charlie's Nite Life
1994	"Good Girls Go to Heaven"	58	Charlie's Nite Life
1994	"Man Behind the Wheel"	—	Charlie's Nite Life
"—" denotes releases that did not chart

=== Music videos ===
Year	Video	Director
1993	"I've Fallen in Love (And I Can't Get Up)"	
1993	"Good Girls Go to Heaven"	Greg Crutcher
1994	"Man Behind the Wheel"	
