= Everywhere I Go (Phil Vassar song) =

Single by Phil Vassar

from the album Traveling Circus
- Released: September 8, 2009
- Genre: Country
- Length: 4:17
- Label: Universal South
- Songwriter(s): Phil Vassar, Jeffrey Steele
- Producer(s): Phil Vassar

Phil Vassar singles chronology
"Bobbi with an I" (2009)	"Everywhere I Go" (2009)	"Let's Get Together" (2011)

"Everywhere I Go" is a song co-written and recorded by American country music artist Phil Vassar. It was released in September 2009 as the second single from the album Traveling Circus. The song reached #36 on the Billboard Hot Country Songs chart. The song was written by Vassar and Jeffrey Steele.

== Critical reception ==
Sam Gazdziak from Engine 145 gave "Everywhere I Go" a thumbs-down, saying that it "sounds so familiar and commonplace that it’s pretty much impossible to stand out in a crowded radio playlist," while Bobby Peacock of Roughstock considered it similar in sound to Vassar's first album and said that it had an "interesting" structure.

== Chart performance ==
Chart (2009)	Peak position
US Hot Country Songs (Billboard)	36
