= Little Red Rodeo =

Single by Collin Raye

from the album The Best of Collin Raye: Direct Hits
- Released: December 19, 1997
- Recorded: 1997
- Genre: Country
- Length: 3:23
- Label: Epic
- Songwriters: Charlie Black; Phil Vassar; Rory Bourke
- Producers: Collin Raye; Billy Joe Walker Jr. Paul Worley

Collin Raye singles chronology
"What the Heart Wants" (1997)	"Little Red Rodeo" (1997)	"I Can Still Feel You" (1998)

"Little Red Rodeo" is a song written by Phil Vassar, Charlie Black and Rory Bourke, and recorded by American country music artist Collin Raye. It was released in December 1997 as the third and final single from his compilation album The Best of Collin Raye: Direct Hits. The song was a Top 5 hit on the Billboard Hot Country Songs chart. He sang it on an episode of Walker, Texas Ranger.

== Content ==
The singer spends most of the song chasing his former lover, who has driven off in a "candy apple red" (Isuzu) Rodeo, leaving a note that she did not think he was looking for a permanent relationship. Eventually conceding that he had not been committed enough, he takes chase from Texas to Monterey, stopping at a diner where her sister works, then at a gas station where the attendant acknowledges she had been there and expected him to chase her. By the end of the song, he has not yet caught the Isuzu but was "closing the gap."

== Chart performance ==
The song debuted at number 46 on the Hot Country Songs chart dated December 20, 1997. It charted for 22 weeks on that chart, and reached a peak of number 3 on the chart dated March 14, 1998.

Chart (1997–1998)	Peak position
Canada Country Singles (RPM)	1
US Hot Country Songs (Billboard)	3

=== Year-end charts ===
Chart (1998)	Position
Canada Country Tracks (RPM)	15
US Country Songs (Billboard)	21

== Other versions ==
- Phil Vassar, who co-wrote the song, later recorded it on his 2006 CD, Greatest Hits, Vol. 1.
