= Shaken Not Stirred (Phil Vassar album) =

Studio album by Phil Vassar
- Released: September 28, 2004
- Studios: Quad Studios, Cartee Day Studios, Thelma's East, East Iris Studios and Emerald Entertainment (Nashville, Tennessee); The Castle, The Laundry Room and Sound Kitchen (Franklin, Tennessee)
- Genre: Country
- Length: 46:54
- Label: Arista Nashville
- Producers: Nick Brophy, Frank Rogers, Phil Vassar

Phil Vassar chronology
American Child (2002)	Shaken Not Stirred (2004)	Greatest Hits, Vol. 1 (2006)

Singles from Shaken Not Stirred
- 1. "In a Real Love" Released: May 4, 2004; 2. "I'll Take That as a Yes (The Hot Tub Song)" Released: November 1, 2004; 3. "Good Ole Days" Released: June 25, 2005

Professional ratings
Review scores
Source	Rating
About.com	3.5/5 stars
AllMusic	4/5 stars
Melodic	2.5/5 stars

Shaken Not Stirred is the third studio album by American country music singer Phil Vassar. Released in 2004 on Arista Nashville, the album produced Vassar's second and final number-one single on the Billboard Hot Country Singles & Tracks chart with the track "In a Real Love". The second single, "I'll Take That as a Yes (The Hot Tub Song)", reached number 17 on the country chart, while the third single ("Good Ole Days") peaked at number 22.

Vassar produced the entire album, working with Frank Rogers on tracks 1, 2, 4, 7, and 10, and Nick Brophy on the rest.

== Track listing ==
No.	Title	Writer(s)	Length
1.	"Good Ole Days"	Craig Wiseman, Phil Vassar	3:04
2.	"In a Real Love"	Wiseman, Vassar	3:34
3.	"What Happens in Vegas"	Patrick Jason Matthews, Kerry Kurt Phillips, Chris DuBois	3:41
4.	"I'll Take That as a Yes (The Hot Tub Song)"	Jon McElroy, Vince Melamed	3:29
5.	"Erase"	Vassar, Julie Wood	4:27
6.	"Here to Forget"	Billy Alcorn, Vassar, Jeff Smith	3:48
7.	"I Miss the Innocence"	Vassar, Julie Wood, Jeff Wood	5:04
8.	"Amazing Grace"	Wiseman, Vassar	3:55
9.	"Nobody Knows Me Like You"	Vassar, Julie Wood, Smith	3:38
10.	"Dancin' with Dreams"	Vassar, Charlie Black, Bobby Fischer	3:49
11.	"Gone by Dawn"	Vassar, Julie Wood, Robert Byrne	4:08
12.	"Black and Whites"	Wiseman, Vassar	4:10
Total length:			46:54

== Personnel ==
- Phil Vassar – vocals, acoustic piano, synthesizers, vocal ad-libs (1)
- Jim "Moose" Brown – keyboards, acoustic piano, Wurlitzer electric piano, clavinet, Hammond B3 organ
- Steve Nathan – keyboards (1, 2, 4, 7, 11)
- Tim Akers – acoustic piano (3, 5, 6, 8–10, 12), keyboards (3, 5, 6, 8–10, 12), organ (3, 5, 6, 8–10, 12)
- Clayton Ryder – acoustic piano (3, 5, 6, 8–10, 12), keyboards (3, 5, 6, 8–10, 12), organ (3, 5, 6, 8–10, 12)
- Jeff King – electric guitars
- Russ Pahl – electric guitars (1, 2, 4, 7, 11), slide guitar (1, 2, 4, 7, 11), steel guitar (1, 2, 4, 7, 11)
- Bryan Sutton – acoustic guitar (1, 2, 4, 7, 11), mandolin (1, 2, 4, 7, 11)
- Nick Brophy – acoustic guitar (3, 5, 6, 8–10, 12), electric guitars (3, 5, 6, 8–10, 12)
- Robert Byrne – acoustic guitar (3, 5, 6, 8–10, 12)
- Glenn Worf – bass (1, 2, 4, 7, 11)
- Darren Theriault – bass (3, 5, 6, 8–10, 12)
- Shannon Forrest – drums (1, 2, 4, 7, 11)
- Angelo Collura – drums (3, 5, 6, 8–10, 12)
- Eric Darken – percussion (1, 2, 4, 7, 11)
- Larry Franklin – fiddle (1, 2, 4, 7, 11)
- Matt Thomas – fiddle (3, 5, 6, 8–10, 12), mandolin (3, 5, 6, 8–10, 12)
- Russell Terrell – backing vocals
- Wes Hightower – backing vocals (1, 2, 4, 7, 11)
- Craig Wiseman – vocal ad-libs (1)
- Jeff Smith – backing vocals (3, 5, 6, 8–10, 12)
- Julie Wood Vassar – backing vocals (3, 5, 6, 8–10, 12)

=== Production ===
- Phil Vassar – producer
- Frank Rogers – producer (1, 2, 4, 7, 11)
- Nick Brophy – producer (3, 5, 6, 8–10, 12), recording (3, 5, 6, 8–10, 12)
- Richard Barrow – recording (1, 2, 4, 7, 11), digital editing (1, 2, 4, 7, 11)
- Neal Cappellino – additional recording (1, 2, 4, 7, 11), digital editing (1, 2, 4, 7, 11)
- Jason Lehning – additional recording (1, 2, 4, 7, 11), digital editing (1, 2, 4, 7, 11)
- Steve Short – additional recording (1, 2, 4, 7, 11)
- Mark Greenwood – additional recording (3, 5, 6, 8–10, 12)
- Steve Crowder – recording assistant (1, 2, 4, 7, 11)
- Mark Petaccia – recording assistant (1, 2, 4, 7, 11)
- Brady Barnett – digital editing (1, 2, 4, 7, 11)
- Adam Hatley – digital editing (1, 2, 4, 7, 11)
- Brian David Willis – digital editing (1, 2, 4, 7, 11)
- Justin Niebank – mixing
- Allen Ditto – mix assistant (3, 5, 6, 8–10, 12)
- Hank Williams – mastering at MasterMix (Nashville, Tennessee)
- Phillip Stein – production assistant (1, 2, 4, 7, 11)
- S. Wade Hunt – art direction, cover design
- Katherine Stratton – design
- Erick Anderson – photography
- Greg Hill Management – management

== Charts ==
=== Weekly charts ===
Chart (2004)	Peak position
US Billboard 200	69
US Top Country Albums (Billboard)	10

=== Year-end charts ===
Chart (2005)	Position
US Top Country Albums (Billboard)	68
