= Don't Miss Your Life =

Single by Phil Vassar
- Released: February 13, 2012
- Genre: Country, country pop
- Length: 3:31
- Label: Rodeowave Entertainment
- Songwriters: Phil Vassar; Charlie Black
- Producer: Phil Vassar

Phil Vassar singles chronology
"Let's Get Together" (2011)	"Don't Miss Your Life" (2012)	"Love Is Alive" (2013)

"Don't Miss Your Life" is a song co-written and recorded by American country music artist Phil Vassar. It was released in February 2012. Vassar wrote the song with frequent collaborator Charlie Black.

== Inspiration ==
Vassar told The Boot about writing the song "The main thing that strikes me about this song is it's real, it's about something real. I just wrote it on an airplane. I was talking to a guy sitting next to me who was retired, and it was a long West Coast to East Coast flight. I do a lot of writing on airplanes anyway ... I always have my iPad, and that's where I write my lyrics because I'm always a little bored and it gives me time to focus."

== Critical reception ==
Billy Dukes of Taste of Country gave the song 3.5 out of 5 stars, and wrote "Don’t Miss Your Life’ is a little wordy, and Vassar’s straightforward style is beginning to show some age, but that doesn’t mean that on an individual level this song won’t have a huge impact." Giving it 5 out of 5 stars, Bobby Peacock of Roughstock wrote " Phil sings convincingly and emotionally, the song's flowing melody and gentle piano never getting in his way."

== Music video ==
The music video premiered in early May 2012. It was directed by Steve Condon.

== Chart performance ==
"Don't Miss Your Life" debuted at number 57 on the U.S. Billboard Hot Country Songs chart for the week of February 11, 2012.

Chart (2012)	Peak position
US Hot Country Songs (Billboard)	32
