= Last Day of My Life =

"Last Day Of My Life"

Single by Phil Vassar

from the album Greatest Hits, Vol. 1
- Released: February 7, 2006
- Genre: Country
- Length: 4:09 (album version); 3:57 (radio edit)
- Label: Arista Nashville
- Songwriters: Phil Vassar; Tim Ryan
- Producers: Frank Rogers; Phil Vassar

Phil Vassar singles chronology
"Good Ole Days" (2005)	"Last Day Of My Life" (2006)	"The Woman in My Life" (2006)

"Last Day of My Life" is a song co-written and recorded by American country music singer Phil Vassar. It was released in February 2006 as the first single from his compilation album Greatest Hits, Vol. 1, and Vassar's twelfth chart single overall. The song reached a peak of number 2 on the Billboard Hot Country Songs charts. It was written by Vassar and Tim Ryan.

== Content ==
"Last Day of My Life" was co-written by Vassar and former solo artist Tim Ryan. It is a ballad in which the narrator realizes that he is not spending enough time with his family and friends; he comes to this realization after attending a friend's funeral. Vassar was inspired to write the song after attending the funeral of his friend Robert Byrne, with whom he co-wrote his 2001 single "Rose Bouquet".) In the chorus, the singer vows to show more affection towards his wife, and love her like "it's the last day of [his] life".

After being asked whether the song was meant to be a life lesson, or a ballad about love-making, Vassar replied:

"[I]t's a lesson before you make out. No, I think what it is, you know, is for me personally[…] when life is over, it's over man. And you just kinda go, "Whoa, wait a minute. I need to re-think this thing." So you put it on such a personal level[…]and you think, "Man, what am I doing? I work all the time doing all this stuff that maybe is just trivial and maybe I need to spend more time with you." So that's what it is. It is a love song."

== Music video ==
A music video for the song debuted on CMT (Country Music Television) and GAC (Great American Country), the two major country music television networks, on April 1, 2006. Directed by Roman White, it features Vassar performing behind a greenscreen onto which animation is projected.

== Chart performance ==
Chart (2006)	Peak position
US Hot Country Songs (Billboard)	2
US Billboard Hot 100	47
US Billboard Pop 100	75

=== Year-end charts ===
Chart (2006)	Position
US Country Songs (Billboard)	17
