= Say the Word (Joel Feeney song) =

Single by Joel Feeney

from the album ...Life Is but a Dream
- Released: 1993
- Genre: Country
- Length: 3:44
- Label: MCA
- Songwriters: Joel Feeney; Chris Farren; Jeffrey Steele
- Producers: Chris Farren; Hayward Parrott

Joel Feeney singles chronology
"The Tennessee Hills" (1992)	"Say the Word" (1993)	"By Heart" (1994)

"Say the Word" is a song recorded by Canadian country music artist Joel Feeney. It was released in 1993 as the first single from his second studio album, ...Life Is but a Dream. It peaked at number 5 on the RPM Country Tracks chart in January 1994.

== Chart performance ==
Chart (1993–1994)	Peak position
Canada Country Singles (RPM)	5

=== Year-end charts ===
Chart (1994)	Position
Canada Country Tracks (RPM)	58
