= American Child =

Studio album by Phil Vassar
- Released: August 6, 2002
- Studios: Ocean Way Recording and Emerald Entertainment (Nashville, Tennessee): Essential Sound Studios (Franklin, Tennessee); Extasy Recording Studio South (Los Angeles, California); Record One (Sherman Oaks, California)
- Genre: Country
- Length: 44:11, 50:57 (re-issue)
- Label: Arista Nashville
- Producers: Byron Gallimore; Phil Vassar; Dann Huff

Phil Vassar chronology
Phil Vassar (2000)	American Child (2002)	Shaken Not Stirred (2004)

Singles from American Child
- 1. "American Child" Released: April 29, 2002; 2. "This Is God" Released: January 6, 2003; 3. "Ultimate Love" Released: June 9, 2003

Professional ratings
Review scores
Source	Rating
About.com	(favorable)
AllMusic	3/5 stars

American Child is the second studio album by American country music artist Phil Vassar. Released in 2002, the album initially contained twelve tracks, with the title track serving as the lead-off single, reaching top 5 on the Billboard Hot Country Singles & Tracks (now Hot Country Songs) charts.

After the lead-off single fell from the charts, Arista tested another song entitled "This Is God". This song received such positive feedback from its test audience that the album was recalled and re-released on January 6, 2003 with "This Is God" (and a cover of Huey Lewis and the News' "Workin' for a Livin'") added to the track listing. The former was also released as a single, reaching Top 20 on the country charts, while the third single ("Ultimate Love") peaked at number 41, becoming the first single of Vassar's career to miss Top 40 entirely.

Vassar produced the album with Byron Gallimore except for "This Is God", which Vassar produced with Dann Huff instead.

Although it was not issued as a single, "Athens Grease" was made into a music video.

== Track listing ==
No.	Title	Writer(s)	Length
1.	"American Child"	Phil Vassar, Craig Wiseman	3:14
2.	"Forgettin's So Long"	Robert Byrne, Vassar	3:43
3.	"Time's Wastin'"	Freddy Myles, Vassar	3:54
4.	"I'm Already Gone"	Annie Roboff, Vassar	3:33
5.	"Athens Grease"	Steve Mandile, Jerry Vandiver, Vassar	3:59
6.	"Baby, You're Right"	Brett James, Vassar	3:34
7.	"Ultimate Love"	Rodney Clawson, Vassar, Julie Wood	3:06
8.	"Stand Still"	Connie Harrington, Vassar, Julie Wood	4:12
9.	"Someone You Love"	Thomas, Vassar	3:35
10.	"Houston"	Vassar, Julie Wood	3:29
11.	"I Thought I Never Would Forget"	Tim Nichols, Vassar	4:14
12.	"I'll Be The One"	Vassar, Julie Wood, Jeff Wood	3:38
Total length:			44:11

2003 Reissue
No.	Title	Writer(s)	Length
12.	"Workin' for a Livin'" (Featuring Huey Lewis)	Huey Lewis, Chris Hayes	3:15
13.	"I'll Be The One"	Vassar, Julie Wood, Jeff Wood	3:38
14.	"This Is God"	Vassar	3:31
Total length:			50:57

== Personnel ==
- Phil Vassar – lead vocals, acoustic piano
- Steve Nathan – keyboards
- Clayton Ryder – accordion
- Biff Watson – acoustic guitars
- Pat Buchanan – electric guitars
- Michael Landau – electric guitars
- B. James Lowry - electric guitars
- Brent Mason – electric guitars
- Paul Franklin – steel guitar
- Mike Brignardello – bass
- Lonnie Wilson – drums
- Aubrey Haynie – fiddle
- Michael Omartian – string arrangements
- Carl Gorodetzky – string contractor
- Nashville String Machine – strings
- Perry Coleman – backing vocals
- Gene Miller – backing vocals
- Jeff Smith – backing vocals
- Russell Terrell – backing vocals
- Huey Lewis – vocals (13)

=== Production ===
- Bryan Gallimore – producer (1–13)
- Phil Vassar – producer
- Dann Huff – producer (14)
- Julian King – recording
- John Paterno – recording
- Clint Brown – additional recording
- Ricky Cobble – additional recording
- Dennis Davis – additional recording
- Jason Gantt – additional recording
- Jason Lefan – additional recording
- Erik Lutkins – additional recording, recording assistant
- Justin Smith – additional recording
- David Bryant – recording assistant
- Leslie Richter – recording assistant
- Jeff Balding – mixing
- Mike Shipley – mixing
- Greg Burns – mix assistant
- Jed Hackett – mix assistant
- Cory Churko – Pro Tools engineer
- Robert Hadley – mastering
- Doug Sax – mastering
- The Mastering Lab (Hollywood, California) – mastering location
- S. Wade Hunt – art direction, design
- Glen Rose – photography
- Melissa Schleicher – grooming
- Jennifer Kemp – stylist

== Chart performance ==
Chart (2002)	Peak position
U.S. Billboard Top Country Albums	4
U.S. Billboard 200	44
