= I'll Take That as a Yes (The Hot Tub Song) =

Single by Phil Vassar

from the album Shaken Not Stirred
- Released: November 1, 2004
- Genre: Country
- Length: 3:27
- Label: Arista Nashville
- Songwriters: Vince Melamed, Jon McElroy
- Producers: Frank Rogers, Phil Vassar

Phil Vassar singles chronology
"In a Real Love" (2004)	"I'll Take That as a Yes (The Hot Tub Song)" (2004)	"Good Ole Days" (2005)

"I'll Take That as a Yes (The Hot Tub Song)" is a song written by Vince Melamed and Jon McElroy, and recorded by American country music artist Phil Vassar. It was released in November 2004 as the second single from the album Shaken Not Stirred. The song reached number 17 on the Billboard Hot Country Singles & Tracks chart.

== Music video ==
The music video was directed by Shaun Silva and premiered in 2005.

== Chart performance ==
Chart (2004–2005)	Peak position
US Hot Country Songs (Billboard)	17
US Billboard Hot 100	89
