= Phil Vassar (album) =

Studio album by Phil Vassar
- Released: February 22, 2000
- Recorded: 1999–2000
- Studios: Ocean Way Recording, Loud Recording Studios and Studio 56 (Nashville, Tennessee); Essential Sound Studios (Franklin, Tennessee)
- Genre: Country
- Length: 41:22
- Label: Arista Nashville
- Producers: Phil Vassar; Byron Gallimore

Phil Vassar chronology
Phil Vassar (2000)	American Child (2002)

Singles from Phil Vassar
- 1. "Carlene" Released: October 25, 1999; 2. "Just Another Day in Paradise" Released: June 5, 2000; 3. "Rose Bouquet" Released: January 15, 2001; 4. "Six-Pack Summer" Released: June 4, 2001; 5. "That's When I Love You" Released: October 29, 2001

Phil Vassar is the debut studio album by American country music artist Phil Vassar, released on February 25, 2000. It features the singles "Carlene", "Just Another Day in Paradise", "Rose Bouquet", "Six-Pack Summer" and "That's When I Love You". All of these, except "Rose Bouquet", charted in the Top Ten on the Billboard Hot Country Singles & Tracks (now Hot Country Songs) charts. "Just Another Day in Paradise" was Vassar's first Number One hit on that chart.

== Content ==
The track "Drive Away" was previously recorded by Sons of the Desert on their 1997 debut album Whatever Comes First.

== Critical reception ==
Professional ratings
Review scores
Source	Rating
AllMusic	4/5 stars

Giving it 4 out of 5 stars, Vince Ripol of AllMusic wrote that "On his own, Vassar is an enthusiastic vocalist, a skilled pianist, and a gifted composer of spirited, nostalgic tales."

== Track listing ==
All tracks are written by Phil Vassar, with additional co-writers noted.

No.	Title	Writer(s)	Length
1.	"Carlene"	Charlie Black; Rory Bourke	4:07
2.	"Just Another Day In Paradise"	Craig Wiseman	3:53
3.	"That's When I Love You"	Julie Wood	3:30
4.	"Rose Bouquet"	Robert Byrne	3:53
5.	"Joe & Rosalita"	Black	3:27
6.	"Six-Pack Summer"	Black; Tommy Rocco	3:39
7.	"Lucky As Me"	Byrne	3:43
8.	"Like I Never Loved Before"	Byrne	4:06
9.	"Didn't You Know She's Gone"	Don Sampson	3:15
10.	"Somewhere In Between"	Wood	3:54
11.	"Drive Away"	Black	3:41
Total length:			41:10

== Personnel ==
Compiled from liner notes.

- Phil Vassar – lead vocals, acoustic piano
- Steve Nathan – keyboards
- Larry Byrom – acoustic guitars
- Michael Landau – electric guitars
- B. James Lowry – electric guitars
- Brent Mason – electric guitars
- Dan Dugmore – steel guitar
- Paul Franklin – steel guitar
- Mike Brignardello – bass
- Glenn Worf – bass
- Lonnie Wilson – drums
- Terry McMillan – percussion
- Aubrey Haynie – fiddle
- Collin Raye – backing vocals (1)
- Tim Davis – backing vocals
- Chris Rodriguez – backing vocals
- Jo Dee Messina – backing vocals (3)

=== Production ===
- Mike Sistad – A&R direction
- Bryan Gallimore – producer
- Phil Vassar – producer
- Julian King – recording
- Greg Fogie – second engineer
- Jed Hackett – second engineer
- David Thoener – mixing at Sound Stage Studios (Nashville, Tennessee)
- Tony Green – second mix engineer
- Ricky Cobble – assistant engineer
- Dennis Davis – assistant engineer
- Michael Dy – assistant engineer
- Erik Lutkins – assistant engineer
- Rob MacMillan – assistant engineer
- Russ Martin – assistant engineer
- Doug Sax – mastering at The Mastering Lab (Hollywood, California)
- Ann Callis – production coordinator
- Sandy Campbell – photography
- Maude Gilman-Clapham – art direction
- Missy McKeand – design
- S. Wade Hunt – cover design
- Kelly Meadors – grooming
- Lorrie Turk – grooming
- Claudia Robertson-Fowler – wardrobe stylist
- Morey Management Group – management

== Charts ==
=== Weekly charts ===
Chart (2000)	Peak position
US Top Country Albums (Billboard)	23
US Heatseekers Albums (Billboard)	12

=== Year-end charts ===
Chart (2000)	Position
US Top Country Albums (Billboard)	60
Chart (2001)	Position
US Top Country Albums (Billboard)	42
