= This Is God =

Single by Phil Vassar

from the album American Child
- Released: January 6, 2003
- Recorded: 2002
- Genre: Country
- Length: 3:31
- Label: Arista Nashville
- Songwriter: Phil Vassar
- Producers: Dann Huff; Phil Vassar

Phil Vassar singles chronology
"American Child" (2002)	"This Is God" (2003)	"Ultimate Love" (2003)

"This Is God" is a song written and recorded by American country music artist Phil Vassar. It was released in January 2003 as the second single to the album, American Child. It peaked at number 17 on the U.S. Billboard Hot Country Songs chart, and number 9 on the U.S. Billboard Bubbling Under Hot 100 chart.

== Background and writing ==
Vassar penned this song on a December 2002 plane ride and it was quickly released to country radio. It was made available on subsequent pressings of the album, American Child.

== Content ==
The lyrics reflect the perspective of God and His disgust towards the fact that the world and the people that He created are displaying an unacceptable amount of hatred to one another, resulting in rather violent occasions such as wars, protests, terrorism and the like. It is subsequently a call for accountability and a reminder that there are consequences to actions, with God pleading in conclusion for all of His creations to permanently unite in peace and love.

== Critical reception ==
Deborah Evans Price, of Billboard magazine reviewed the song favorably, calling it a "powerful, emotional song that takes a look at mankind's actions from a divine perspective." She goes on to say that it's not preachy, "just poignant, thought-provoking, and heartfelt, and Vassar's passionate delivery beautifully drives the message home."

Howard Cohen of Knight Ridder news agency cited the song as an example of overtly religious and inspirational country songs in the year 2003, alongside Randy Traviss's "Three Wooden Crosses" and Buddy Jewell's "Help Pour Out the Rain (Lacey's Song)". In the same article, Cohen quoted Bob Barnett, then the program director of WKIS in Boca Raton, Florida, as not being as successful as those songs because he thought it was "too in-your-face".

== Music video ==
The music video was directed by Deaton-Flanigen Productions and premiered in early 2003.

== Chart positions ==
"This Is God" debuted at number 53 on the U.S. Billboard Hot Country Singles & Tracks for the week of January 11, 2003.

Chart (2003)	Peak position
US Hot Country Songs (Billboard)	17
US Bubbling Under Hot 100 (Billboard)	9
