= Joel Feeney =

Canadian singer, songwriter and producer (born 1957)

- Born: Joel Richard Stephan Feeney; November 21, 1957 (age 68)
- Origin: Oakville, Ontario, Canada
- Genres: Country, pop
- Occupations: Singer, songwriter, producer
- Instruments: keyboards
- Years active: 1980 – present
- Labels: MCA Canada, Universal Music

Joel Richard Stephan Feeney (born November 21, 1957) is a Canadian country, pop music singer, songwriter and record producer.

== History ==
Joel Feeney commenced his recording career with the pop rock band The Front. Feeney was also a producer on albums by other Canadian country singers including Family Brown, and worked as a session musician before releasing his debut album Joel Feeney and the Western Front in 1991. The album included songs written by members of The Front.

Feeney's second album Life Is but a Dream was released in 1993 and was produced by Chris Farren. It received a positive review from the Ottawa Citizen which called it a "soft-spoken but intense set of songs".

His most successful hit came in 1995 with "What Kind of Man", which topped the Canadian RPM country singles charts. This song also came from Life Is but a Dream. He is also notable for co-writing LeAnn Rimes' 2005 hit "Nothin' 'Bout Love Makes Sense".

== Discography ==
=== Albums ===
Title	Details
Joel Feeney and the Western Front	Release date: 1991; Label: Justin Entertainment
...Life Is but a Dream	Release date: 1993; Label: MCA Records
Joel Feeney	Release date: 1998; Label: Universal Music Canada

=== Singles ===
Year	Single	Peak chart positions			Album
Year	Single	CAN Country	CAN	CAN AC	Album
1991	"It's a Beautiful Life"	23	—	—	Joel Feeney and the Western Front
1991	"Poor Billy"	71	—	—	Joel Feeney and the Western Front
1991	"Diamonds"	18	69	24	Joel Feeney and the Western Front
1992	"One Good Reason"	28	—	—	Joel Feeney and the Western Front
1992	"If Anything Could Be"	48	—	—	Joel Feeney and the Western Front
1992	"The Tennessee Hills"	26	—	—	Joel Feeney and the Western Front
1993	"Say the Word"	5	—	—	...Life Is but a Dream
1994	"By Heart"	13	—	—	...Life Is but a Dream
1994	"Everything to Me"	11	—	—	...Life Is but a Dream
1994	"Tears Don't Lie"	32	—	—	...Life Is but a Dream
1995	"What Kind of Man"	1	—	—	...Life Is but a Dream
1995	"Life Is But a Dream"	9	—	—	...Life Is but a Dream
1998	"A Little Bit of Your Love"	12	—	—	Joel Feeney
1998	"Leslie's Wedding Day"	16	—	—	Joel Feeney
1999	"She Ain't Gonna Cry"	15	—	—	Joel Feeney
2000	"A Wonderful Life"	49	—	—	Joel Feeney
"—" denotes releases that did not chart

=== Guest singles ===
Year	Single	Artist	Peak positions	Album
Year	Single	Artist	CAN Country	Album
2000	"I Will"	Eli Barsi	75	Eli Barsi

=== Music videos ===
Year	Video
1991	"Diamonds"
1992	"If Anything Could Be"
1995	"What Kind of Man"
1995	"Life Is But a Dream"
1998	"A Little Bit of Your Love"
1998	"Leslie's Wedding Day"

=== Other albums ===
==== Finkleman's 45s The Doug Riley Sessions Live From The Montreal Bistro ====
This album was released by CBC audio in 2001

Song
"It's All Right"
"Rock & Roll Lullaby"
"Bad Boy" with Cal Dodd, Neil Donnell and Michael Dunstion

==== Finkleman's 45s The Doug Riley Sessions Live From The Montreal Bistro Vol. 2 ====
This album was released by CBC audio in 2003

Song
"Storybook Children" with Sharon Lee Williams
"Pickin' Wild Mountain Berries" with Maddy Willis
"Let it Be Me" with Maddy Willis
"Rock 'n' Roll Heaven" with Sheree Cerqua
