= Love Is a Beautiful Thing (Phil Vassar song) =

"It's a Beautiful Thing"

Single by Paul Brandt

from the album That's the Truth
- B-side: "Add 'em All Up"
- Released: September 14, 1999
- Genre: Country
- Length: 4:27
- Label: Reprise
- Songwriters: Jeffrey Steele; Craig Wiseman
- Producer: Chris Farren

Paul Brandt singles chronology
"That's the Truth" (1999)	"It's a Beautiful Thing" (1999)	"That Hurts" (2000)

"It's a Beautiful Thing", also known as "Love Is a Beautiful Thing", is a country music song co-written by American songwriters Jeffrey Steele and Craig Wiseman. The first version of this song was released on September 14, 1999, by Canadian singer Paul Brandt from his 1999 album That's the Truth, from which it was released as a single in both Canada and the United States. Eight years later, American singer Phil Vassar covered the song under the title "Love Is a Beautiful Thing" on his album Prayer of a Common Man. Vassar's version reached its peak of #2 on the Billboard Hot Country Songs charts in mid-2008.

== Content ==
The song is a moderate up-tempo detailing the various events of a wedding. The verses primarily list actions by the various relatives who have gathered for the event, such as young children horseplaying in the pews, and an aunt who arrived because her "sister's girl" is getting married. In the chorus, the narrator observes that "love is a beautiful thing".

== Paul Brandt version ==
The first version of this song was released as by Canadian singer Paul Brandt under the title "It's a Beautiful Thing". It was included on Brandt's 1999 album That's the Truth, and was his last Top 40 country hit in the United States. It was also a #13 hit for him on the Canadian country charts.

=== Chart performance ===
Chart (1999–2000)	Peak position
Canada Country Singles (RPM)	13
US Hot Country Songs (Billboard)	38

=== Year-end charts ===
Chart (1999)	Position
Canada Country Tracks (RPM)	89

== Phil Vassar version ==
"Love Is a Beautiful Thing"

Single by Phil Vassar

from the album Prayer of a Common Man
- Released: October 30, 2007
- Genre: Country
- Length: 3:57
- Label: Universal South
- Songwriters: Jeffrey Steele; Craig Wiseman
- Producers: Phil Vassar; Mark Wright

Phil Vassar singles chronology
"This Is My Life" (2007)	"Love Is a Beautiful Thing" (2007)	"I Would" (2008)

Phil Vassar covered the song in 2007 under the title of "Love Is a Beautiful Thing". His rendition was the second single released from his 2008 album Prayer of a Common Man. His version includes a few minor lyrical changes, such as "Uncle Joe and Uncle Jake / Haven't spoken since '98", instead of "…haven't spoken since '88." Also, while Brandt's version ends in a fade-out, with him still singing, Vassar's version ends with a cold piano outro.

=== Chart performance ===
Chart (2007–2008)	Peak position
US Hot Country Songs (Billboard)	2
US Billboard Hot 100	48

=== Year-end charts ===
Chart (2008)	Position
US Country Songs (Billboard)	6

== Music video ==
The music video for Vassar's version features scenes of him playing a piano in front of various wedding pictures. This video was directed by Peter Zavadil.
