= That's When I Love You =

Single by Phil Vassar

from the album Phil Vassar
- Released: October 29, 2001
- Recorded: 1999–2000
- Genre: Country
- Length: 3:30
- Label: Arista Nashville
- Songwriters: Phil Vassar; Julie Wood
- Producers: Phil Vassar, Byron Gallimore

Phil Vassar singles chronology
"Six-Pack Summer" (2001)	"That's When I Love You" (2001)	"American Child" (2002)

"That's When I Love You" is a song co-written and recorded by American country music artist Phil Vassar. It was released in October 2001 as the fifth and final single from his debut album Phil Vassar. It peaked at number 3 on the Hot Country Songs chart, and number 37 on the Billboard Hot 100 chart. Vassar co-wrote this song along with his former wife Julie Wood. They both also wrote one of his other singles "The Woman in My Life", which was a top 20 hit in 2006.

The song features a backing vocal from Jo Dee Messina.

== Chart positions ==
"That's When I Love You" debuted at number 51 on the U.S. Billboard Hot Country Singles & Tracks for the week of November 3, 2001.

Chart (2001–2002)	Peak position
US Hot Country Songs (Billboard)	3
US Billboard Hot 100	37

=== Year-end charts ===
Chart (2002)	Position
US Country Songs (Billboard)	26
