= Tim Ryan Rouillier =

American singer-songwriter

- Also known as: Tim Ryan
- Born: February 4, 1964 (age 62)
- Origin: St. Ignatius, Montana, United States
- Genres: Country
- Occupation: Singer-songwriter
- Instruments: Vocals, guitar
- Years active: 1990–present
- Labels: Epic, BNA, Warner

Tim Ryan Rouillier (born February 4, 1964), sometimes known as Tim Ryan, is an American country music artist. Between 1990 and 1997, Ryan released four major-label studio albums. He also charted six singles on Billboard Hot Country Singles & Tracks chart. His highest charting single, "Dance in Circles," peaked in 1990. Although he has not charted a single since 1993, Ryan has written several songs for other artists, including Phil Vassar's 2006 single "Last Day of My Life". In 2020, Rouillier composed a musical about the state of Montana titled Play Me Montana, which has aired on PBS.

== Discography ==
=== Albums ===
Title	Album details	Peak positions
Title	Album details	US Country
Tim Ryan	Release date: July 25, 1990; Label: Epic Records	62
Seasons of the Heart	Release date: September 24, 1991; Label: Epic Records	—
Idle Hands	Release date: May 25, 1993; Label: BNA Records	—
Tried, True and Tested	Release date: September 23, 1997; Label: Warner Bros. Records	—
"—" denotes releases that did not chart

=== Singles ===
Year	Single	Peak chart positions		Album
Year	Single	US Country	CAN Country	Album
1990	"Dance in Circles"	42	26	Tim Ryan
1990	"Breakin' All the Way"	69	—	Tim Ryan
1991	"Seventh Direction"	68	—	Seasons of the Heart
1992	"I Will Love You Anyhow"	65	—	Seasons of the Heart
1993	"Idle Hands"	71	—	Idle Hands
1993	"Love on the Rocks"	—	89	Idle Hands
"—" denotes releases that did not chart

=== Music videos ===
Year	Video	Director
1990	"Dance in Circles"	Michael Merriman
1990	"Breakin' All the Way"	Jim May
1992	"I Will Love You Anyhow"	Michael Merriman
1993	"Idle Hands"	Marius Penczner
1993	"Love on the Rocks"	
