= Carlene (song) =

Single by Phil Vassar

from the album Phil Vassar
- B-side: "Six-Pack Summer"
- Released: October 25, 1999
- Recorded: 1999
- Genre: Country
- Length: 4:06 (album version)
- Label: Arista Nashville
- Songwriters: Charlie Black; Rory Bourke; Phil Vassar
- Producers: Phil Vassar; Byron Gallimore

Phil Vassar singles chronology
"Carlene" (1999)	"Just Another Day In Paradise" (2000)

"Carlene" is a song co-written and recorded by American country music artist Phil Vassar. It was released in October 1999 as Vassar's debut single, from his self-titled debut album (2000). "Carlene" reached a peak of number 5 on the U.S. Billboard Hot Country Singles & Tracks charts and number 45 on the U.S. Billboard Hot 100, and it reached number 1 in Canada. The song was written by Vassar, Charlie Black and Rory Bourke.

== Content ==
"Carlene" is a moderate up-tempo backed mainly by piano, played by Vassar. In the lyric, the narrator recalls a girl named Carlene with whom he went to high school. He recalls being an athlete who struggled with his academics, while she was the valedictorian. Now an adult, he visits the school yard, where he meets Carlene again. He tells her that she is "lookin' good". In the second verse, the two go out for a ride together and begin conversing. She reveals that she now has a Ph.D. and is modeling for Vogue, while he is a songwriter who "finally got a couple [songs] out on country radio". The single edit omits one repetition of the chorus at the end.

Collin Raye sings backing vocals on the song.

== Music video ==
The music video was directed by Gerry Wenner, and premiered on CMT on October 29, 1999, when CMT named it a "Hot Shot". It features Vassar singing the song while playing the piano on a rooftop. About a girl name Carlene who is a teenage girl who is valedictorian and had a 4.0 and also had a phd and become a supermodel and reunited with Phil and be together. Carlene is similar to supermodel Cindy Crawford who is a 4.0 and a valedictorian in dekalb Illinois. She dropped out of northwestern after her first semester and become a supermodel full time.

== Critical reception ==
Country Standard Time critic George Hauenstein cited "Carlene" as a standout track on Vassar's debut album. He said that although the song did not have a traditional country music sound, it was a "fun, up-tempo song", and that it was more lyrically substantial than most other songs on the country radio at the time. Vince Ripol, reviewing the album for Allmusic, also described "Carlene" favorably, calling it "boisterous" and an "immediate hit", also saying that Vassar's songwriting style recalled Tom T. Hall's story songs.

== Chart positions ==
"Carlene" debuted at number 74 on the U.S. Billboard Hot Country Singles & Tracks for the week of October 30, 1999. Although Vassar had written several singles for other singers since the mid-1990s, "Carlene" is his first release as a singer.

Chart (1999–2000)	Peak position
Canada Country Singles (RPM)	1
US Billboard Hot 100	45
US Hot Country Songs (Billboard)	5

=== Year-end charts ===
Chart (2000)	Position
US Country Songs (Billboard)	21
