= In a Real Love =

Single by Phil Vassar

from the album Shaken Not Stirred
- Released: May 4, 2004
- Genre: Country
- Length: 3:34
- Label: Arista Nashville
- Songwriters: Phil Vassar, Craig Wiseman
- Producers: Frank Rogers, Phil Vassar

Phil Vassar singles chronology
"Ultimate Love" (2003)	"In a Real Love" (2004)	"I'll Take That as a Yes (The Hot Tub Song)" (2004)

"In a Real Love" (2004) is a song co-written and recorded by American country music singer Phil Vassar. It was released on May 4, 2004, as the first single from the album Shaken Not Stirred. The song reached the top of the Billboard Hot Country Singles & Tracks chart on November 6 becoming his second number one hit of his career and his first since "Just Another Day in Paradise" in 2000. The song was written by Vassar and Craig Wiseman.

== Background ==
Vassar discussed the song's inspiration on his website in 2004:

Here's another one that Craig and I wrote. It came about because of this picture I had of me in high school with a leather jacket. I had this Bruce Jenner/Wings haircut. I thought I ruled the school. In other words … what a dork [laughs]. But it also was inspired by Julie, my wife, showing me this EPT and saying, "Guess what?" That's how I found out about Presley.

== Chart positions ==
Chart (2004)	Peak position
US Hot Country Songs (Billboard)	1
US Billboard Hot 100	38

=== Year-end charts ===
Chart (2004)	Position
US Country Songs (Billboard)	21
