= The Woman in My Life =

Single by Phil Vassar

from the album Greatest Hits, Vol. 1
- Released: August 7, 2006
- Genre: Country
- Length: 3:44
- Label: Arista Nashville
- Songwriters: Phil Vassar; Julie Wood
- Producers: Frank Rogers; Phil Vassar

Phil Vassar singles chronology
"Last Day of My Life" (2006)	"The Woman in My Life" (2006)	"This Is My Life" (2007)

"The Woman in My Life" is a song recorded by American country music artist Phil Vassar. It was released in August 2006 as the second single from his compilation album Greatest Hits, Vol. 1. Vassar co-wrote the song with then-wife Julie Wood.

== Critical reception ==
The song received a favorable review from Deborah Evans Price of Billboard, who wrote that it has "a great lyric with a lovely sentiment that audiences will readily connect with."

== Chart performance ==
The song debuted at number 56 on the U.S. Billboard Hot Country Songs chart for the week of August 19, 2006.

Chart (2006–2007)	Peak position
US Hot Country Songs (Billboard)	20
