= Six-Pack Summer =

Single by Phil Vassar

from the album Phil Vassar
- B-side: "Carlene"
- Released: June 4, 2001
- Recorded: 1999
- Genre: Country
- Length: 3:39
- Label: Arista Nashville
- Songwriters: Charlie Black; Phil Vassar; Tommy Rocco
- Producers: Phil Vassar; Byron Gallimore

Phil Vassar singles chronology
"Rose Bouquet" (2001)	"Six-Pack Summer" (2001)	"That's When I Love You" (2001)

"Six-Pack Summer" is a song co-written and recorded by American country music artist Phil Vassar. It was released in June 2001 as the fourth single from his album Phil Vassar. It peaked at number 9 on the U.S. Billboard Hot Country Singles & Tracks and at number 56 on the U.S. Billboard Hot 100. The song was written by Vassar, Tommy Rocco and Charlie Black.

== Content ==
The song paints a vivid picture of summer joys such as barbecuing, suntanning and partying.

== Critical reception ==
Deborah Evans Price, of Billboard magazine reviewed the song favorably, calling it "one of those tunes that will want to make you reach for a six-pack of your favorite beverage and just kick back with the sun on your face." She goes on to say that the song boasts a melody "as breezy as a day at the beach."

== Music video ==
The music video was directed by Glen Rose, and was filmed at Percy Priest Lake in Nashville. It was released on June 26, 2001.

== Chart positions ==
It peaked at number 9 on the Hot Country Songs chart on September 15, 2001 and number 56 on the Billboard Hot 100 chart on September 22, 2001.

Chart (2001)	Peak position
US Hot Country Songs (Billboard)	9
US Billboard Hot 100	56

=== Year-end charts ===
Chart (2001)	Position
US Country Songs (Billboard)	52
