= Rose Bouquet =

2001 single by Phil Vassar

Single by Phil Vassar

from the album Phil Vassar
- Released: January 15, 2001
- Genre: Country
- Length: 3:53
- Label: Arista Nashville
- Songwriters: Robert Byrne; Phil Vassar
- Producers: Phil Vassar, Byron Gallimore

Phil Vassar singles chronology
"Just Another Day in Paradise" (2000)	"Rose Bouquet" (2001)	"Six-Pack Summer" (2001)

"Rose Bouquet" is a song co-written and recorded by American country music artist Phil Vassar. It was released in January 2001 as the third single from his debut album, Phil Vassar. The song was written by Vassar and Robert Byrne.

== Chart performance ==
"Rose Bouquet" debuted at number 56 on the U.S. Billboard Hot Country Songs chart for the week of January 20, 2001.

Chart (2001)	Peak position
US Hot Country Songs (Billboard)	16
US Billboard Hot 100	78
