= American Child (song) =

Single by Phil Vassar

from the album American Child
- Released: April 29, 2002
- Recorded: 2002
- Genre: Country
- Length: 3:14
- Label: Arista Nashville
- Songwriters: Phil Vassar; Craig Wiseman
- Producers: Byron Gallimore; Phil Vassar

Phil Vassar singles chronology
"That's When I Love You" (2001)	"American Child" (2002)	"This Is God" (2003)

"American Child" is a song co-written and recorded by American country music artist Phil Vassar. It was released in April 2002 as the lead-off single and title track from the album of the same name. It peaked at number 5 on the Hot Country Songs chart, and number 48 on the Billboard Hot 100 chart. The song was written by Vassar and Craig Wiseman.

== Content ==
The song is a personal saga of one American man's rise from "Nowhere, Virginia" to a life in the spotlight and satisfaction as a father. "Nowhere, Virginia" is a reference to his hometown of Lynchburg, Virginia.

== Critical reception ==
Deborah Evans Price, of Billboard magazine reviewed the song favorably, saying that the track kicks off with a "beautiful trill of mandolin, then continues to build and swell." She goes on to say that by the time the song hits the chorus, the production has "escalated into a grand, sweeping backdrop that nicely complements the upbeat lyric." She concludes her review by saying that the song will "kindle pride in the hearts of all who are appreciative of the freedom Americans have to pursue our dreams."

== Music video ==
The music video was directed by Shaun Silva. It features Phil Vassar playing a piano and singing the song in the middle of a wheatfield. Scenes also show him and a girl (as mentioned below) with a camera filming and taking pictures. A squad of World War II U.S. Army infantry, carrying a flag, appear from time to time, symbolizing the sacrifice of earlier generations, as does his then 3-year-old daughter Haley, who partially inspired the song. The video reached #1 on CMT's Top 20 Countdown.

== Chart positions ==
"American Child" debuted at number 55 on the U.S. Billboard Hot Country Singles & Tracks for the week of May 4, 2002. It peaked at number 5 on the Hot Country Songs chart on October 26, 2002 and number 48 on the Billboard Hot 100 chart on October 19, 2002.

Chart (2002)	Peak position
US Hot Country Songs (Billboard)	5
US Billboard Hot 100	48

=== Year-end charts ===
Chart (2002)	Position
US Country Songs (Billboard)	32
