= Just Another Day in Paradise (Phil Vassar song) =

2000 single by Phil Vassar

Single by Phil Vassar

from the album Phil Vassar
- B-side: "Rose Bouquet"
- Released: June 5, 2000
- Genre: Country
- Length: 3:53
- Label: Arista Nashville
- Songwriters: Craig Wiseman; Phil Vassar
- Producers: Phil Vassar; Byron Gallimore

Phil Vassar singles chronology
"Carlene" (1999)	"Just Another Day in Paradise" (2000)	"Rose Bouquet" (2001)

"Just Another Day in Paradise" is a song co-written and recorded by American country music singer Phil Vassar that reached the top of the Billboard Hot Country Singles & Tracks chart It was released in June 2000 as the second single from his self-titled debut album. It also peaked at #35 on the Billboard Hot 100 making it Vassar's highest peaking song on the chart. The song was written by Vassar and Craig Wiseman.

== Content ==
The song tells the story of a couple raising a family, and dealing with all the mundane domestic distractions, from sour milk and a broken washing machine to a stack of bills.

== Critical reception ==
Deborah Evans Price, of Billboard magazine, reviewed the song favorably, calling it "a celebration of the joys and challenges of the American family." She goes on to say that Vassar has a "strong, warm voice, and he does so much more than simply sing a song. He injects it with personality and emotion - and he truly brings it to life".

== Music video ==
The music video was directed by Gerry Wenner, and premiered on CMT on June 29, 2000.

== Chart positions ==
"Just Another Day in Paradise" debuted at number 65 on the U.S. Billboard Hot Country Singles & Tracks for the week of June 10, 2000.

Chart (2000)	Peak position
Canada Country Singles (RPM)	2 (Note: "Just Another Day in Paradise" had not yet peaked when RPM ceased publication in November 2000.)
US Hot Country Songs (Billboard)	1
US Billboard Hot 100	35

=== Year-end charts ===
Chart (2000)	Position
US Country Songs (Billboard)	43

Chart (2001)	Position
US Country Songs (Billboard)	59

== Parodies ==
This song was parodied by country parodist Cledus T. Judd on his album Cledus Envy under the title "Just Another Day in Parodies". Vassar makes a spoken cameo at the end of Judd's parody.
