= Phil Vassar =

American country music artist

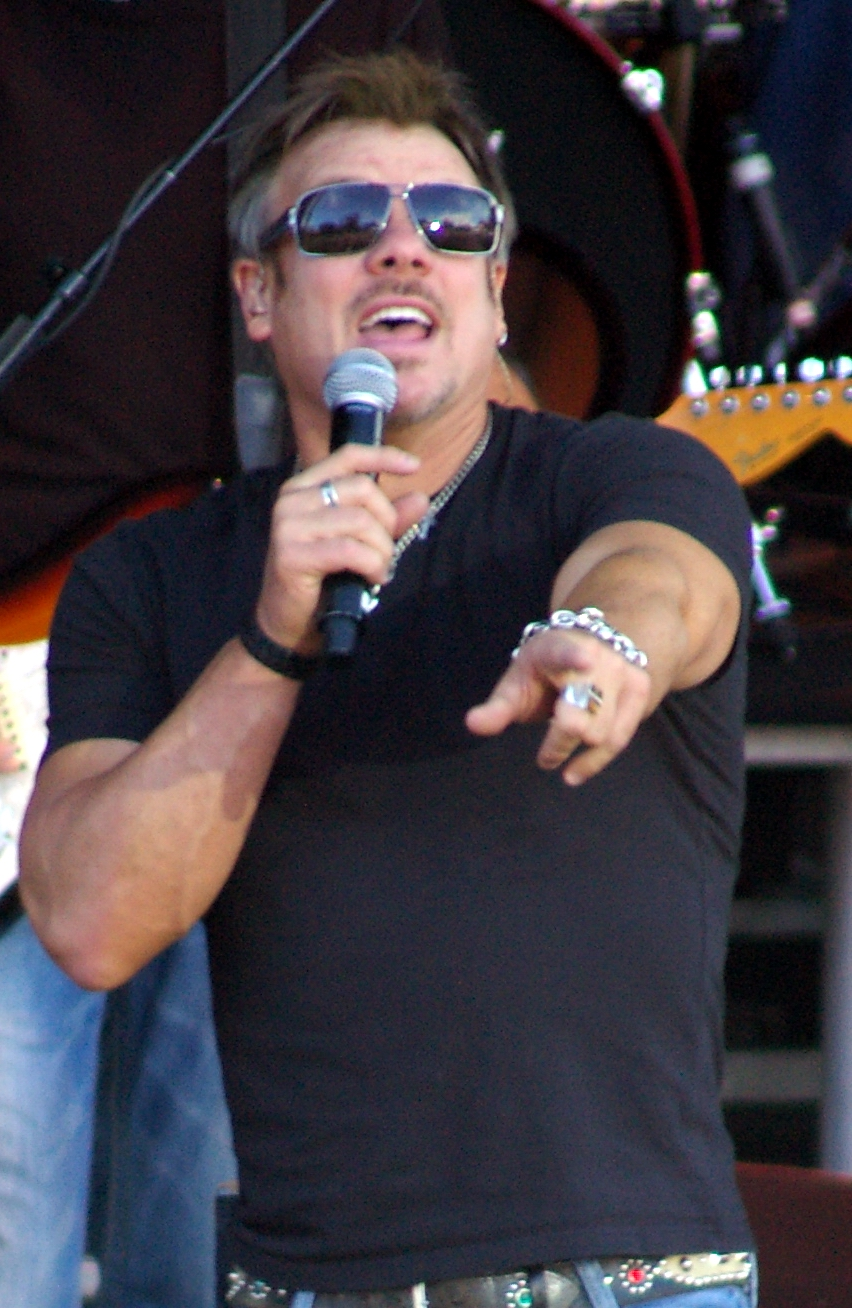
- Vassar performing at the 2008 Durham Fair in Durham, Connecticut

Background information
- Born: Phillip George Vassar Jr. May 28, 1962 (age 64)
- Origin: Lynchburg, Virginia, U.S.
- Genres: Country
- Occupation: Singer-songwriter
- Instruments: Vocals, piano
- Years active: 1997–present
- Labels: Arista Nashville; Show Dog-Universal; Rodeowave Entertainment
- Spouse: Julie Wood (m. 2003; div. 2007)
- Website: http://www.philvassar.com/

Phillip George Vassar Jr. (born May 28, 1962) is an American country music artist. Vassar made his debut on the country music scene in the late 1990s, co-writing singles for several country artists, including Tim McGraw ("For a Little While", "My Next Thirty Years"), Jo Dee Messina ("Bye, Bye", "I'm Alright"), Collin Raye ("Little Red Rodeo"), and Alan Jackson ("Right on the Money"). In 1999, he was named by American Society of Composers, Authors, and Publishers (ASCAP) as Country Songwriter of the Year.

Later that same year, Vassar was signed to Arista Nashville as a recording artist. His debut album, Phil Vassar, was released in early 2000, producing five hits on the U.S. Billboard country singles charts and earning a gold certification in the United States. He followed it in 2002 with American Child, Shaken Not Stirred in 2004, and finally Greatest Hits, Vol. 1 in 2006 before Vassar left the label for Universal South Records (now Show Dog-Universal Music). His first album for that label, Prayer of a Common Man, was released in early 2008. He has charted nineteen singles on Billboard's Hot Country Songs, including two which peaked at No. 1: 2000's "Just Another Day in Paradise" and 2004's "In a Real Love".

== Biography ==
Vassar was born May 28, 1962, in Lynchburg, Virginia. He attended James Madison University in Harrisonburg, Virginia. While there, Vassar had taken up playing the piano, and eventually found work as a singer in clubs. He was also a member of the Eta Kappa chapter of the Theta Chi fraternity. He then decided to move to Nashville, Tennessee, to pursue a career in music. Eventually, he was signed to a small publishing contract, but was unable to land any hits on this contract.

== Musical career ==
=== As a songwriter ===
Starting in the late 1990s, Vassar began writing songs that were recorded by several country music artists. Among the artists who recorded his material were Blackhawk ("Postmarked Birmingham"), Collin Raye ("Little Red Rodeo"), Jo Dee Messina ("Bye, Bye", "I'm Alright"), Tim McGraw ("For a Little While"), Alan Jackson ("Right on the Money"), and Neal McCoy ("I Was"). Of them, "Bye, Bye", "I'm Alright", and "Right on the Money" all reached No. 1 on the country chart. "Bye, Bye" earned Vassar his first American Society of Composers, Authors, and Publishers (ASCAP) award for Song of the Year, and in 1999 he was named ASCAP's Songwriter of the Year.

=== As a singer ===
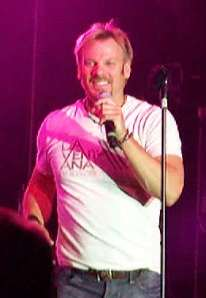
Phil Vassar (2007)

In late 1999, Vassar was signed to his first recording contract, with the Arista Nashville label. His debut single, "Carlene", was issued that year, and by mid-2000 the song had gone on to peak at No. 5 on the Billboard country charts. It featured a backing vocal from Collin Raye.

The song was the lead-off single to Vassar's self-titled debut album, which he co-produced with Byron Gallimore. "Carlene" was followed by "Just Another Day in Paradise", his first No. 1 hit as a singer. Shortly after that song peaked, Tim McGraw topped the charts with "My Next Thirty Years", which Vassar co-wrote. Overall, Phil Vassar produced three more singles: the No. 16 "Rose Bouquet", "Six-Pack Summer" at No. 9, and finally "That's When I Love You", with a backing vocal from Jo Dee Messina, at No. 3. In addition, the album earned a gold certification from the Recording Industry Association of America (RIAA) for shipping 500,000 copies. Its success led to tours with Kenny Chesney.

Vassar also co-wrote the tracks "God Bless This Town" and "Live It Up" on Marshall Dyllon's late 2000 debut album Enjoy the Ride, in addition to co-producing them with Robert Byrne. The latter was released as a single.

=== American Child ===
American Child was Vassar's second album, once again co-produced with Gallimore. It was released in 2002, the same year in which he married Julie Wood, with whom he co-wrote "That's When I Love You". The album's title track served as its lead-off single, reaching a peak of No. 5 on the country charts, and the album itself peaked at No. 4 on the Top Country Albums charts. In mid-2002, he also co-wrote and performed a charity single called "Words Are Your Wheels" to promote literacy. Released exclusively through Walmart stores, this song featured guest vocals from Kenny Chesney, Brooks & Dunn, Martina McBride, and Sara Evans.

While "American Child" was climbing the charts, Arista tested another song written by Vassar, "This Is God". The song was so well received by test audiences that American Child was re-released in early 2003. The re-issue featured "This Is God" along with a cover of Huey Lewis and the News's "Workin' for a Livin'", with Dann Huff producing both recordings. "This Is God" was issued as the album's second single, becoming a Top 20 country hit. After it, came "Ultimate Love", which peaked at No. 41.

=== Shaken Not Stirred and Greatest Hits ===
In 2004, Vassar released his third studio album, Shaken Not Stirred. The album produced Vassar's second No. 1 as a singer in the song "In a Real Love". Also released from this album were the No. 17 "I'll Take That as a Yes (The Hot Tub Song)" and the No. 22 "Good Ole Days". Unlike with his first two albums, Vassar recorded Shaken Not Stirred with his road band. Vassar produced the album with Nick Brophy and Frank Rogers.

Vassar's first greatest hits compilation, Greatest Hits, Vol. 1, was issued in 2006. This album comprised the biggest hits from his studio albums to that point, as well as his renditions of "Bye, Bye", "I'm Alright", "My Next Thirty Years", and "Little Red Rodeo". The album also included three new songs. Two were released as singles, starting with the No. 2 "Last Day of My Life", which Vassar was inspired to write after attending the funeral of his friend Robert Byrne, with whom he co-wrote his 2001 single "Rose Bouquet". The second and final single from Greatest Hits, "The Woman in My Life" (another song co-written by Vassar and his wife), reached No. 20 on the country chart, shortly before Vassar parted ways with Arista Nashville.

=== Prayer of a Common Man ===
In March 2007, Vassar signed to Universal South Records, which became part of Show Dog-Universal Music in December 2009. His first single for the label, "This Is My Life", was released in mid-2007, peaking at No. 35 on the country music charts. Succeeding it was "Love Is a Beautiful Thing" This song was co-written by Jeffrey Steele and Craig Wiseman, and was previously recorded in 1999 by Canadian singer Paul Brandt under the title "It's a Beautiful Thing". By April 2008, "Love Is a Beautiful Thing" had reached No. 2 on the country charts, and Vassar's first album for Universal South (Prayer of a Common Man) was released. A third single from this album, "I Would", was issued in July 2008 and peaked at No. 26. It was followed in early 2009 by the album's title track, which became the lowest-peaking single of his career at No. 53.

=== Traveling Circus ===
One week after "Prayer of a Common Man" fell from the chart, Vassar charted his eighteenth single, "Bobbi with an I". Released in April 2009, it was the first single from Vassar's fifth studio album, Traveling Circus, released in December 2009. It peaked at No. 46 after eight weeks on the chart, and was followed by "Everywhere I Go".

=== American Soul ===
Vassar signed with Rodeowave Entertainment in 2011, releasing the single "Let's Get Together". This song made the top 40 late in the year, followed by "Don't Miss Your Life" in early 2012. On March 18, 2013, Vassar released his twenty-second single, "Love is Alive". On November 15, 2016, Vassar announced via his Facebook page that his new album, American Soul would be released on December 2, 2016.

=== Stripped Down ===
Released on January 17, 2020, the album’s production puts the songs front and center. It features songs written over the past 20 years but never-before recorded and new music, including "This Is Where the End Starts", co-written with daughter, Haley Vassar. Vassar's take on "Postmarked Birmingham," a hit he wrote for Blackhawk, is on the album. Numerous hit songwriters collaborated with Vassar on the album, including Ross Copperman, John Rich, Don Sampson, and Charlie Black.

=== I Only Miss You When I'm Breathing ===
In 2020, Vassar starred in the short film I Only Miss You When I'm Breathing, for which he earned the award for Best Actor at the 2020 Long Island International Film Expo.

== Personal life ==
On March 26, 2002, Vassar married Julie Wood, with whom he co-wrote his singles "That's When I Love You" and "The Woman in My Life". Vassar has two daughters: Haley (born August 27, 1998), from a previous marriage, and Presley Jade (born December 4, 2003) with Wood. Vassar and Wood divorced in 2007.

Vassar is a fan of the Baltimore Orioles and the Baltimore Ravens.

== Discography ==
=== Albums ===
- Phil Vassar (2000)
- American Child (2002)
- Shaken Not Stirred (2004)
- Greatest Hits, Vol. 1 (2006)
- Prayer of a Common Man (2008)
- Traveling Circus (2009)
- Noel (2011)
- The Hits Live On Broadway (2011)
- American Soul (2016)
- Stripped Down (2020)
