= Blue Moon (disambiguation) =

A blue moon is an astronomical phenomenon.

Blue Moon may also refer to:

== Film, television, and theatre ==
- The Blue Moon (musical), a 1905 London musical
- The Blue Moon (film), a 1920 American silent drama film
- Blue Moon, a 1997 Taiwanese film starring Tarcy Su
- Blue Moon (2000 film), an American comedy-drama film written and directed by John A. Gallagher
- Blue Moon (2002 film), an Austrian road movie/romantic comedy written and directed by Andrea Maria Dusl
- Blue Moon (2006 film), a Philippine romantic drama directed by Joel Lamangan
- "Blue Moon", the title of one of the episodes of the 2005 documentary series Extraterrestrial/Alien Worlds
- Blue Moon (2021 film), a Romanian film by Alina Grigore, Golden Shell winner at the 69th San Sebastián International Film Festival
- Blue Moon (2025 film), an American biographical musical drama film about Lorenz Hart
- "Blue Moon" (Little Witch Academia), a 2017 television episode
- "Blue Moon" (American Horror Story), a 2021 television episode
- Blue Moon, a 2016–18 TV series starring Karine Vanasse

== Literature ==
- Blue Moon (Child novel), a 2019 Jack Reacher novel by Lee Child
- Blue Moon (Hamilton novel), a 1998 Anita Blake: Vampire Hunter novel by Laurell K. Hamilton
- Blue Moon (Noël novel), a 2009 Immortals novel by Alyson Noël

== Music ==
=== Albums ===
- Blue Moon (Carmen McRae album), 1956
- Blue Moon (The Marcels album), 1961
- Blue Moon (Sofia Talvik album), 2005
- Blue Moon (Steve Holy album), 2000
- Blue Moon (Toby Keith album), 1996
- Blue Moon, by Robben Ford, 2002

=== Songs ===
- "Blue Moon" (1934 song), written by Richard Rodgers and Lorenz Hart
- "Blue Moon" (Steve Holy song), 2000
- "Blue Moon" (Beck song), 2014
- "Blue Moon" (BtoB song), 2018
- "Blue Moon" (Zara Larsson song), 2025
- "Blue Moon", by Bebe Rexha from Bebe, 2023
- "Blue Moon", by Big Star from Third/Sister Lovers, 1978
- "Blue Moon", by De/Vision, 1995
- "Blue Moon", by Hearts2Hearts from Focus, 2025
- "Blue Moon", by Hyolyn with Changmo, 2017
- "Blue Moon", by Moby from Destroyed, 2011
- "Blue Moon", by Upchurch from Creeker II, 2019

== Products and companies ==
- Blue Moon (beer), a Belgian-style witbier manufactured by MillerCoors
- Blue moon (ice cream), a blue-colored ice cream popular in the U.S. Midwest
- Blue Moon Diner in Gardner, Massachusetts, U.S.
- Blue Moon Tavern in Seattle, Washington, U.S.
- Blue Moon Books: New York-based publisher of erotic fiction active from 1984, in 2007 its parent company, Avalon Publishing Group, was acquired by Perseus Books Group.
- Blue Moon Press, a British small press founded by Charles Lahr

== Science and technology ==
- Blue moon, an atmospheric phenomenon caused by the 1883 eruption of Krakatoa
- Blue Moon, former name of the cruise ship Azamara Quest
- Blue Moon (spacecraft), a robotic cargo-carrier-and-lander design concept for making deliveries to the Moon
- Blue moon butterfly or Hypolimnas bolina, a butterfly species
- Blue moon danio, a freshwater fish

== Other uses ==
- Blue Moon, a fictional country in the Wars series of video games
- Blue Moon (game), a fantasy card game
- Blue Moon, Kentucky, U.S.
- Blue Moon Odom (born 1945), American baseball pitcher
- Blue Moon of Josephine, a South African blue diamond

== See also ==
- Once in a Blue Moon (disambiguation)
- The Moon Is Blue 1951
