= It's Just Love =

It's Just Love may refer to:

- It's Just Love (Nat & Alex Wolff song), by Nat and Alex Wolff
- A single by Misia from the 2000 album Love Is the Message, 2000
- A single by Sofia Talvik
- A song by Dave Lambert on A Taste of Strawbs
- A song by Rumi Ohishi 大石ルミ from the Japanese anime series Mobile Suit Gundam Wing
- A song by Sofia Talvik from the 2007 album Street of Dreams
