= Love Don't Run =

Love Don't Run may refer to:

- Love Don't Run (album), a 2011 album by Steve Holy
- Love Don't Run (Steve Holy song), 2011
- Love Don't Run (The Dillman Band song), 1981
