= Brand New Girlfriend =

Studio album by Steve Holy
- Released: August 8, 2006
- Genre: Country
- Length: 45:51
- Label: Curb
- Producer: Mike Curb; Doug Johnson; Michael Lloyd; Lee Thomas Miller

Steve Holy chronology
Blue Moon (2000)	Brand New Girlfriend (2006)	Love Don't Run (2011)

Singles from Brand New Girlfriend
- 1. "Brand New Girlfriend" Released: January 16, 2006; 2. "Come On Rain" Released: October 9, 2006; 3. "Men Buy the Drinks (Girls Call the Shots)" Released: May 22, 2007

Professional ratings
Review scores
Source	Rating
Country Standard Time	mixed

Brand New Girlfriend is the second album from country music artist Steve Holy. It was released in 2006 on Curb Records. Prior to its release, Holy had charted five singles ("I'm Not Breakin'", "Rock-a-Bye Heart", "Put Your Best Dress On", "Go Home", and "It's My Time (Waste It If I Want To)") which were not released on albums, although they all charted.

The title track to Brand New Girlfriend became Holy's second Number One single on the Billboard Hot Country Songs charts, a position that it held for one week. At the time, its thirty-six-week climb to Number One was the slowest climb to Number One since the inception of Nielsen SoundScan in 1990. This record was broken one year later by Tracy Lawrence's "Find Out Who Your Friends Are", which reached Number One on its forty-first chart week. "Brand New Girlfriend" also reached No. 40 on the Billboard Hot 100 and No. 60 on the Pop 100.

Following the title track, two other singles — "Come On Rain" and "Men Buy the Drinks (Girls Call the Shots)" — were released from this album, both peaking in the lower regions of the top 40 on the country charts. Also included is a cover of "All for the Love of Sunshine", which was previously a Number One country hit for Hank Williams, Jr. (and the Mike Curb Congregation) in 1970, while the song "Wrap Around" was originally recorded by Keith Anderson on his 2005 album Three Chord Country and American Rock & Roll.

== Critical reception ==
Jeffrey B. Remz of Country Standard Time gave the album a mixed review, saying that he considered Holy's performances strongest on the more traditionally-influenced songs and the title track.

== Track listing ==
No.	Title	Writer(s)	Length
1.	"Brand New Girlfriend"	Bart Allmand, Shane Minor, Jeffrey Steele	3:39
2.	"Come On Rain"	Pat Bunch, Doug Johnson	3:27
3.	"Hurry Up"	Bunch, Johnson, Steve Holy	3:22
4.	"Baby Don't Go"	Holy, Jimmy Yeary	3:18
5.	"A Cliff in Colorado"	Randy Boudreaux, Larry Shell, Kim Williams	3:35
6.	"Men Buy the Drinks (Girls Call the Shots)"	Arlos Smith, Ashe Underwood	3:19
7.	"Good Night to Be Lonely"	Michael Dulaney, Jason Sellers	3:28
8.	"Lead Me On"	Monty Powell, Chuck Wicks, Anna Wilson	3:42
9.	"Only the Lonely Talking"	Minor, Sonny LeMaire, Clay Mills	3:33
10.	"Wrap Around"	Keith Anderson, John Rich, Williams	3:28
11.	"Memory on the Run"	Brice Long, Chris Stapleton	3:06
12.	"All for the Love of Sunshine"	Mike Curb, Harley Hatcher, Lalo Schifrin	3:55
13.	"What Could I Do Different Tonight"	Madeline Stone, Orrin Hatch, Sam Lorber	3:54

== Personnel ==
- Kelly Back – electric guitar
- David Biondolillo – background vocals
- Matt Bissonette – bass guitar
- Christi Black – background vocals
- Bruce Bouton – steel guitar
- Jim "Moose" Brown – keyboards
- Steve Bryant – bass guitar
- Joe Chemay – bass guitar
- Jim Cox – piano
- Eric Darken – percussion
- Chip Davis – background vocals
- Bill Decker – background vocals
- Dan Dugmore – steel guitar
- Mike Durham – electric guitar
- Gary Falcone – background vocals
- Thom Flora – background vocals
- Larry Franklin – fiddle
- Ellis Hall – background vocals
- Tommy Harden – drums
- Connie Harrington – background vocals
- Wes Hightower – background vocals
- John Hobbs – Hammond organ
- Steve Holy – lead vocals
- Joanna Janét – background vocals
- John Barlow Jarvis – piano
- John Jorgenson – electric guitar
- Laurence Juber – acoustic guitar
- Wayne Killius – drums, percussion
- Troy Lancaster – electric guitar
- Paul Leim – drums
- Greg Leisz – steel guitar
- Chris Leuzinger – electric guitar
- Michael Lloyd – background vocals
- Debbie Lytton – background vocals
- Gordon Mote – Hammond organ, piano
- Jimmy Nichols – strings
- Melissa Pierce – background vocals
- David Pruitt – background vocals
- Brent Rowan – electric guitar
- Curt Ryle – acoustic guitar
- Scotty Sanders – steel guitar
- John D. Sharp – background vocals
- John R. Sharp – background vocals
- Gary Stockdale – background vocals
- Bryan Sutton – acoustic guitar
- Carmen Twillie – background vocals
- Wanda Vick – mandolin
- Dennis Wage – keyboards
- Chris Wann – background vocals
- Scott Williamson – drums
- Monalisa Young – background vocals
- Jonathan Yudkin – banjo

Production

- Lee Thomas Miller - tracks 1, 4, 5, 6, 7, 10, 11
- Doug Johnson - tracks 2, 3, 8
- Michael Lloyd and Mike Curb - tracks 9, 12

== Chart performance ==
=== Album ===
Chart (2006)	Peak position
U.S. Billboard 200	19
U.S. Billboard Top Country Albums	2

=== Singles ===
Year	Single	Peak chart positions		
Year	Single	US Country	US	US Pop
2006	"Brand New Girlfriend"	1	40	60
2006	"Come On Rain"	35	—	—
2007	"Men Buy the Drinks (Girls Call the Shots)"	38	—	—
"—" denotes releases that did not chart
