= Ordinary Love =

Ordinary Love may refer to:

- "Ordinary Love" (Paris Bennett song), on the album Princess P
- "Ordinary Love" (Shane Minor song), on the album Shane Minor
- "Ordinary Love" (U2 song), in the film Mandela: Long Walk to Freedom
- Ordinary Love (2019 film), a British romantic drama
- Ordinary Love (世間情), a Taiwanese TV series starring Angus Hsieh, Vicky Tseng and Norman Chen, etc.
