= The Owls Are Not What They Seem =

Studio album by Sofia Talvik
- Released: 31 January 2012
- Genre: Americana; chamber pop; folk; indie pop
- Length: 46:14
- Label: Makaki Music
- Producer: Sofia Talvik

Sofia Talvik chronology
| Florida - Acoustic (2010) | The Owls Are Not What They Seem (2012) | Drivin' & Dreaming LIVE (2013) |

The Owls Are Not What They Seem is an album by Swedish folk musician Sofia Talvik. Released in 2012, the album was promoted by Talvik with a 16-month tour of the United States.

== Track listing ==
| No. | Title | Length |
|---|---|---|
| 1. | "Delusional" | 4:06 |
| 2. | "The Garden" | 3:36 |
| 3. | "7 Miles Wide" | 5:54 |
| 4. | "The War" | 3:54 |
| 5. | "If I Had a Man" | 3:55 |
| 6. | "Glow" | 3:43 |
| 7. | "Circle of Friends" | 3:20 |
| 8. | "To Watch the Bridges Burn" | 2:40 |
| 9. | "Everyone's Favourite Concubine" | 3:49 |
| 10. | "Bitter Sweet Bliss" | 3:26 |
| 11. | "Awfully Aware" | 3:28 |
| 12. | "Nothing Quite So Gentle" | 4:23 |
| Total length: | | 46:14 |
