= V – Part Three of L.O.V.E =

V - Part Three of L.O.V.E

EP by Sofia Talvik
- Released: September 1st 2011
- Genre: Synthpop, Americana, folk, indie pop
- Length: 14:32
- Label: Makaki Music
- Producer: Janne Manninen

Sofia Talvik chronology
O - Part Two of L.O.V.E (2011)	V - Part Three of L.O.V.E (2011)

V – Part Three of L.O.V.E is the third EP in Sofia Talvik's four album saga, and was released 2011. Along with three new songs, the album includes a new performance of Jonestown, the title song from her earlier album, Jonestown. Produced by Talvik's bass player, Janne Manninen, the EP contains an "electronica pop" feel, utilizing synthesizers more than previous projects.

== Track listing ==
All tracks are written by Sofia Talvik

No.	Title	Length
1.	"Delusional"	03:29
2.	"Circle of Friends"	03:31
3.	"To Watch the Bridges Burn"	02:58
4.	"Jonestown"	04:34
