= L – Part One of L.O.V.E =

L - Part one of L.O.V.E

EP by Sofia Talvik
- Released: February 2, 2011
- Genre: Americana, folk, indie pop
- Length: 14:47
- Label: Makaki Music
- Producer: Christian Hörgren

Sofia Talvik chronology
Florida Acoustic (2010)	L - Part one of L.O.V.E (2011)	O – Part Two of L.O.V.E (2011)

L - Part one of L.O.V.E is the first EP in Sofia Talvik's four album saga, and was released 2011. Along with three new songs, the album includes a new performance of "Ghosts", which originally appeared on Blue Moon.

== Track listing ==
1. Nothing Quite So Gentle 4:24
2. Bittersweet Bliss 3:24
3. Everyone's Favorite Concubine 4:05
4. Ghosts 2:54
