= Love Don't Run (album) =

Studio album by Steve Holy
- Released: September 13, 2011
- Genre: Country
- Label: Curb
- Producer: Lee Thomas Miller

Steve Holy chronology
Brand New Girlfriend (2006)	Love Don't Run (2011)	Best of Steve Holy (2014)

Singles from Love Don't Run
- 1. "Love Don't Run" Released: January 10, 2011; 2. "Until the Rain Stops" Released: December 5, 2011; 3. "Hauled Off and Kissed Me" Released: August 2012

Love Don't Run is the third studio album by American country music artist Steve Holy. It was released on September 13, 2011, via Curb Records. The album includes an acoustic version of Holy's 2001 number one single, "Good Morning Beautiful."

"If It Gets You Where You Wanna Go" was covered by Canadian country music artist Dallas Smith on his debut album Jumped Right In and released as a single in March 2012.

== Track listing ==
No.	Title	Writer(s)	Length
1.	"If It Gets You Where You Wanna Go"	Rodney Atkins, Rodney Clawson, Jim Collins	3:30
2.	"Love Don't Run"	Ben Glover, Joe Leathers, Rachel Thibodeau	3:39
3.	"Hauled Off and Kissed Me"	Collins, Steve Holy, Lee Thomas Miller	3:33
4.	"Until the Rain Stops"	Matt Jenkins, Matthew Ramsey, Trevor Rosen	3:02
5.	"Heart of a Hero"	Pat Bunch, Kelly Roland, Nicole Witt	3:20
6.	"Every Day Should End Like This"	Ross Copperman, Holy, Miller	4:08
7.	"Wonders"	Joel Brentlinger, Holy, Steve Rutledge	3:45
8.	"Let the Sun Shine In"	Holy, Tony Martin, Miller	3:55
9.	"Like I'm Famous"	Chris Cavanaugh, Steven Dale Jones, Jeremy Spillman	2:53
10.	"Help Me Make It Through the Night"	Kris Kristofferson	3:33
11.	"Good Morning Beautiful" (acoustic version)	Todd Cerney, Zack Lyle	3:20

== Personnel ==
- Jim "Moose" Brown- Hammond B-3 organ, piano
- Steve Bryant- bass guitar
- Thom Flora- background vocals
- Steve Hinson- steel guitar
- Steve Holy- lead vocals
- Mike Johnson- steel guitar
- Wayne Killius- drums, percussion
- Troy Lancaster- electric guitar
- James Mitchell- electric guitar
- Jimmy Nichols- strings
- Mike Rojas- Hammond B-3 organ, piano
- Curt Ryle- acoustic guitar
- Wanda Vick- fiddle
- Dennis Wage- piano
- Biff Watson- acoustic guitar
- Scott Williamson- drums, percussion

== Chart performance ==
=== Album ===
Chart (2011)	Peak position
US Billboard Top Country Albums	30
US Billboard 200	135

=== Singles ===
Year	Single	Peak chart positions		
Year	Single	US Country	US Country Airplay	US
2011	"Love Don't Run"	19	—	78
2011	"Until the Rain Stops"	57	—	—
2012	"Hauled Off and Kissed Me"	55	55	—
"—" denotes releases that did not chart
