= O – Part Two of L.O.V.E =

O - Part Two of L.O.V.E

EP by Sofia Talvik
- Released: June 6, 2011
- Genre: Americana, folk, indie pop
- Length: 15:32
- Label: Makaki Music
- Producer: Joakim Lundgren

Sofia Talvik chronology
L - Part One of L.O.V.E (2011)	O - Part Two of L.O.V.E (2011)	V - Part Three of L.O.V.E (2011)

O – Part Two of L.O.V.E is the second EP in Sofia Talvik's four album saga, and was released 2011. Along with three new songs, the album includes a new performance of King of the Willow Tree, which originally appeared in Florida.

== Track listing ==
1. Glow 4:12
2. Awfully Aware 3:49
3. The War 3:53
4. King of the Willow Tree 3:38
