= Slave to the Habit =

Single by Shane Minor

from the album Shane Minor
- Released: March 23, 1999
- Length: 3:04
- Label: Mercury
- Songwriters: Toby Keith, Chuck Cannon, Kostas
- Producer: Dann Huff

Shane Minor singles chronology
"Slave to the Habit" (1999)	"Ordinary Love" (1999)

"Slave to the Habit" is a song recorded by American country music artist Shane Minor. It was his debut single and was released in March 1999 as the first single from the album Shane Minor. The song reached number 20 on the Billboard Hot Country Singles & Tracks chart and peaked at number 8 on the RPM Country Tracks chart in Canada. It was written by Toby Keith, Chuck Cannon, and Kostas.

== Music video ==
The music video was directed by Steven Goldmann and premiered in March 1999.

== Chart performance ==
Chart (1999)	Peak position
Canada Country Singles (RPM)	8
US Billboard Hot 100	82
US Hot Country Songs (Billboard)	20

=== Year-end charts ===
Chart (1999)	Position
Canada Country Tracks (RPM)	81
