= Blue Moon (Steve Holy album) =

Studio album by Steve Holy
- Released: October 10, 2000
- Recorded: 1999–2000 at Rosewood Studios
- Genre: Country
- Length: 43:49
- Label: Curb
- Producer: Wilbur C. Rimes

Steve Holy chronology
Blue Moon (2000)	Brand New Girlfriend (2006)

Singles from Blue Moon
- 1. "Don't Make Me Beg" Released: October 16, 1999; 2. "Blue Moon" Released: April 22, 2000; 3. "The Hunger" Released: November 11, 2000; 4. "Good Morning Beautiful" Released: July 16, 2001

Professional ratings
Review scores
Source	Rating
Allmusic	4/5 stars

Blue Moon is the debut studio album by country music artist Steve Holy. Released in 2000 on Curb Records, the album produced four hit singles on the Billboard Hot Country Singles & Tracks chart. The first, "Don't Make Me Beg", peaked at No. 29 and its follow-ups (the title track and "The Hunger") both reached No. 24. Following "The Hunger", Holy charted with "Good Morning Beautiful," which he recorded for the soundtrack to the film Angel Eyes. After this song reached number one, Curb re-issued the album with "Good Morning Beautiful" as a bonus track.

The album was produced by Wilbur C. Rimes, the father of female country music singer LeAnn Rimes.

On February 24, 2009, it was certified Gold by the RIAA.

== Critical reception ==
Jonathan Widran of AllMusic gave the album four stars out of five, comparing Holy's voice to that of Chris Isaak and saying that, although he did not think that Holy showed a distinct musical personality, the album was a "likeable, colorful listening experience."

== Track listing ==
No.	Title	Writer(s)	Length
1.	"Blue Moon"	Gary Leach, Mark Tinney	4:34
2.	"One Beat at a Time"	Jamie O'Hara, James House	3:31
3.	"Cold Kisses"	Tom Shapiro, Chuck Jones, Sharon Vaughn	3:38
4.	"Just a Kiss"	Steve Holy, Kevin Bounds, Leslie Davis	3:56
5.	"The Hunger"	Billy Montana, David Flint	4:01
6.	"Tear One"	House, Dean Miller	2:45
7.	"She's So"	Ray Stephenson, Steve Williams	2:49
8.	"You're Gonna Miss My Love"	Craig Fuller, Mark Selby	4:09
9.	"Someone's Out to Get Me"	Holy, Bounds	4:14
10.	"If That's What You Want"	House	3:15
11.	"Don't Make Me Beg"	Frank Rogers	3:26
12.	"Good Morning Beautiful"	Zack Lyle, Todd Cerney	3:30

== Personnel ==
As listed in liner notes.

Musicians

- Mike Brignardello - bass guitar (2, 3, 7, 10)
- Milo Deering - steel guitar (1, 3–6, 10), Dobro (2), nylon-string guitar (3), acoustic guitar (2–12), fiddle (6–8, 11), mandolin (10, 12)
- Austin Deptula - programming (2, 7)
- Randy Fouts - piano (1, 6, 9, 11, 12), keyboards (4, 5)
- Gary Leach - keyboards (1, 2, 5, 7, 9, 11, 12), piano (3), acoustic guitar (8), organ (8, 10)
- B. James Lowry - acoustic guitar (2, 3, 7, 8, 10), electric guitar (3, 8)
- Curtis Randall - bass guitar (1, 4, 5, 6, 8, 9, 11, 12)
- Brent Rowan - electric guitar (1–3, 7, 8, 10)
- Marty Walsh - electric guitar (1, 4–12), acoustic guitar (1)
- Dan Wojciechowski - drums (all tracks)

Backing vocals

- Rita Baloche (1, 5, 6)
- Perry Coleman (6)
- Milo Deering (11)
- Steve Holy (2, 3, 7, 8, 10)
- Annagrey LaBasse (1, 5, 9, 12)
- Gary Leach (1, 3, 5, 6, 9, 11, 12)
- David Pruitt (4)
- Curtis Randall (11)
- John D. Sharp (4, 11)
- John R. Sharp (4, 11)
- Marty Walsh (11)
- Chris Wann (4, 11)
- Dan Wojciechowski (11)
- Matthew Ward (1, 12)

Technical

- Austin Deptula - assistant
- Russ Harrington - photography
- Greg Hunt - engineer
- Gary Leach -assistant
- Wilbur C. Rimes - producer
- Glenn Sweitzer - art direction

== Chart performance ==
=== Weekly charts ===
Chart (2000–02)	Peak position
US Billboard 200	63
US Top Country Albums (Billboard)	7
US Heatseekers Albums (Billboard)	1

=== Year-end charts ===
Chart (2002)	Position
US Top Country Albums (Billboard)	26

=== Singles ===
Year	Single	Peak chart positions		
Year	Single	US Country	US	CAN Country
1999	"Don't Make Me Beg"	29	—	36
2000	"Blue Moon"	24	120	47
2001	"The Hunger"	24	—	*
2001	"Good Morning Beautiful"	1	29	*
"—" denotes releases that did not chart * denotes unknown peak positions

== Certifications ==
Region	Certification
United States (RIAA)	Gold
