= Blue Moon (1934 song) =

1934 Rodgers and Hart standard

- Sheet music cover, 1934

Song
- Published: 1934 by Robbins Music
- Composer: Richard Rodgers
- Lyricist: Lorenz Hart

"Blue Moon" is a popular song written by Richard Rodgers and Lorenz Hart in 1934 that has become a standard ballad. The song was first recorded in October 1934 by Ted Fio Rito with Muzzy Marcellino on vocals, quickly followed a month later by Frankie Trumbauer and his Orchestra, with vocals by Dick Robertson. Other early recordings included those by Connee Boswell and by Al Bowlly in 1935. The song was a hit twice in 1949, with successful recordings in the U.S. by Billy Eckstine and Mel Tormé.

In 1961, "Blue Moon" became an international number-one hit for the doo-wop group the Marcels, on the Billboard 100 chart and in the UK Singles Chart, and later that same year, an instrumental version by the Ventures charted at number 54. Over the years, "Blue Moon" has been covered by many artists, including Frankie Avalon, the Beatles (as studio jam), Frank Sinatra, Jo Stafford, Ella Fitzgerald, Nat King Cole, Ray Stevens, Billie Holiday, Al Bowlly, Elvis Presley, Bobby Vinton, Sam Cooke, the Platters, Julie London, the Mavericks, Dean Martin, the Supremes, Showaddywaddy, Cyndi Lauper, Bob Dylan, and Rod Stewart. Bing Crosby featured the song in a medley on his 1962 album On the Happy Side. Cowboy Junkies interpolated a version of the standard in "Blue Moon Revisited (Song for Elvis)", on their second album The Trinity Session. Cybill Shepherd sang the song on an episode of the TV series Moonlighting, which is featured on the show's soundtrack album. The song also serves as the anthem for the Premier League football club Manchester City and originally Crewe Alexandra. The final version of the song lyrics contributed to the folklore interpretation of the phrase "blue moon" as a symbol of sadness and loneliness. Most recently, Ethan Hawke was nominated for an Academy Award for portraying the song's lyricist, Lorenz Hart, in the movie Blue Moon, which explores the song's origins and success and Hart's conflicted feelings about the song.

== Background ==
Rodgers and Hart were contracted to Metro-Goldwyn-Mayer in May 1933. They were soon commissioned to write the songs for Hollywood Party, a film that was to star many of the studio's top artists. Rodgers recalled,

One of our ideas was to include a scene in which Jean Harlow is shown as an innocent young girl saying — or rather singing — her prayers. How the sequence fitted into the movie I haven't the foggiest notion, but the purpose was to express Harlow's overwhelming ambition to become a movie star ('Oh Lord, if you're not busy up there,/I ask for help with a prayer/So please don't give me the air ...').

The song was not recorded (the movie was released without Harlow in 1934) and MGM Song No. 225 "Prayer (Oh Lord, make me a movie star)" dated June 14, 1933, was registered for copyright as an unpublished work on July 10, 1933.

Hart wrote new lyrics for the tune, as the title song for the 1934 film Manhattan Melodrama: "Act One:/You gulp your coffee and run;/Into the subway you crowd./Don't breathe, it isn't allowed". The song, also titled "It's Just That Kind of Play", was cut from the film before release, and registered for copyright as an unpublished work on March 30, 1934. The studio then asked for a nightclub number for the film. Rodgers still liked the melody, so Hart wrote a third lyric: "The Bad in Every Man" ("Oh, Lord ... /I could be good to a lover,/But then I always discover/The bad in ev'ry man"), which was sung by Shirley Ross.

After the film was released by MGM, Jack Robbins – the head of the studio's publishing company – decided that the tune was suited to commercial release but needed more romantic lyrics and a punchier title. Hart was initially reluctant to write yet another lyric but he was persuaded. Robbins licensed the final version of the song to Hollywood Hotel, a radio program that used it as the theme. The cover of Robbins' 1934 sheet music edition credits Ted Fio Rito (vocal by Muzzy Marcellino) as introducing the song, recorded on Brunswick 7315, on October 19, 1934. A few weeks later, the song was also recorded by both Dick Robertson and Frankie Trumbauer & his Orchestra for Victor Records, and by Glen Gray and the Casa Loma Orchestra for Decca Records. The song charted in the Variety Top Ten for 18 weeks, reaching No. 1 on January 26, 1935. In 1935, it was also recorded by Connee Boswell for Brunswick Records.

The song subsequently featured in at least seven MGM films, including the Marx Brothers' At the Circus (1939) and (as sung by Elvis Presley) Viva Las Vegas (1964). While most versions of the song begin with the familiar "blue moon", two introductory verses are in the original Robbins sheet music edition. Eric Clapton and Rod Stewart sang the first verse in their 2004 version of the song (Stardust: The Great American Songbook, Volume III). The last line of the first verse is: "Life was a bitter cup for the saddest of all men."

On September 16, 2018, an article in The New York Times reported that documentary filmmaker Liz Roman Gallese claimed on her website a 1936 lawsuit alleging "Blue Moon" was written by her late father, Edward W. Roman. The family story was "that her father had sold the song for $900 to buy a car, or maybe that he had 'settled' with the rich and famous Rodgers and Hart for that amount." Ted Chapin, the chief creative officer of the Rodgers and Hammerstein organization, said that he had not heard of Gallese's story and that it seemed "a little far-fetched".

== Elvis Presley version ==
"Blue Moon"

Single by Elvis Presley

from the album Elvis Presley
- A-side: "Just Because"
- Released: August 31, 1956
- Recorded: August 19, 1954
- Length: 2:31
- Label: RCA Victor/ RCA Camden/ RCA
- Songwriters: Richard Rodgers, Lorenz Hart

"Blue Moon"'s first crossover recording to rock and roll came from Elvis Presley in 1954, produced by Sam Phillips. His cover version of the song was included on his 1956 debut album Elvis Presley, issued on RCA Records. Presley's remake of "Blue Moon" was backed with "Just Because" as a single in August 1956. "Blue Moon" spent 17 weeks on the Billboard Top 100, although it reached only number 55.

Presley's version of "Blue Moon" features prominently in Jim Jarmusch's 1989 film Mystery Train.

In the movie The Outsiders:The Complete Novel, Presley's version of "Blue Moon" was used throughout the film.

== The Marcels version ==
"Blue Moon"

Single by The Marcels

from the album Blue Moon
- B-side: "Goodbye to Love"
- Released: February 1961
- Recorded: 1961
- Genre: Doo wop, R&B
- Length: 2:15
- Label: Colpix
- Songwriters: Richard Rodgers, Lorenz Hart
- Producers: Stu Phillips, Danny Winchell

The Marcels singles chronology
"Blue Moon" (1961)	"Summertime" (1961)

=== Background ===
The Marcels, a doo-wop group, recorded the track for their album Blue Moon. In 1961, the Marcels had three songs left to record and needed one more. Producer Stu Phillips did not like any of the other songs except one that had the same chord changes as "Heart and Soul" and "Blue Moon". He asked them if they knew either, and one knew "Blue Moon" and taught it to the others, though with the bridge or release (middle section – "I heard somebody whisper ...") wrong. The introduction to the song ("bomp-baba-bomp" and "dip-da-dip-da-dip") was an excerpt of an original song that the group had in its act, a cover of "Zoom" by the Cadillacs. Producer Stu Phillips transferred the introduction to "Blue Moon" to give the song additional flair.

=== Reception ===
The record reached number one on the Billboard Pop chart for three weeks and number one on the rhythm and blues chart. It also peaked at No. 1 on the UK Singles Chart. The Marcels' version of "Blue Moon" sold a million copies, and was awarded a gold disc. It is featured in the Rock and Roll Hall of Fame's 500 Songs that Shaped Rock and Roll.

The Marcels' doo-wop version is one of three different versions used in the 1981 film An American Werewolf in London, with this version appearing at the end credits of the film. A version by Bobby Vinton plays during the film's opening titles, while a version by Sam Cooke plays during the film's famous werewolf transformation scene. The Marcels' version of the song is referenced in the 1962 Academy Award-nominated animated short Disney musical film, A Symposium on Popular Songs during the song, "Puppy Love Is Here to Stay" written by Robert & Richard Sherman. It was used as the opening theme of the Brazilian telenovela O Beijo do Vampiro.

=== Charts ===
Chart (1961)	Peak position
Belgium (Ultratop 50 Flanders)	4
Belgium (Ultratop 50 Wallonia)	5
Canada	1
Netherlands (Single Top 100)	6
New Zealand (Lever Hit Parade)	1
Norway (VG-lista)	4
UK Singles Chart	1
US Billboard Hot 100	1
US R&B Singles	1
West Germany (GfK)	13

== Other charting versions ==
American swing era singer Billy Eckstine did a cover version of "Blue Moon" that reached the Billboard charts in 1949. It was released by MGM Records as catalog number 10311. It first reached the Juke Box chart on March 5, 1949, and lasted three weeks there, peaking at number 21.

American jazz singer Mel Tormé did a cover version of "Blue Moon" that also reached the Billboard charts in 1949. It was released by Capitol Records as catalog number 15428. It first reached the Best Seller chart on April 8, 1949, and lasted five weeks on the chart, peaking at number 20. The record was a two-sided hit, as the flip side, "Again", also charted.

Ray Conniff recorded the song in early 1964; it reached number 19 on the Bubbling Under Hot 100 chart.

Canadian band Cowboy Junkies recorded a version for their 1988 album The Trinity Session as its third single, titled "Blue Moon Revisited (Song for Elvis)". This version combines "Blue Moon" with new content written by the band. The single charted in the UK at number 87 in 1989 and was their highest-charting single there.

American country music group the Mavericks covered the song for the soundtrack of the 1995 film Apollo 13. Their version peaked at number 57 on the RPM Country Tracks chart in Canada. It also charted on the RPM Adult Contemporary Tracks chart, peaking at number 15. A music video was produced, directed by Todd Hallowell.

British singer Rod Stewart recorded the song with Eric Clapton for Stewart's 2004 album Stardust: The Great American Songbook, Volume III. Their version was released as a single in early 2005 and peaked at number 23 on the Billboard Adult Contemporary chart in the US.

The Frank Sinatra version was featured in the 2010 Obsidian Entertainment video game Fallout: New Vegas on the in-game radio "Radio New Vegas" and in the opening cinematic.

== See also ==
- Blue Moon (disambiguation)
- Blue Moon of Kentucky
- List of 1930s jazz standards
- List of Hot 100 number-one singles of 1961 (U.S.)
- List of number-one R&B singles of 1960 (U.S.)
- List of number-one singles from the 1960s (UK)
