= Shane Minor (album) =

Studio album by Shane Minor
- Released: April 13, 1999
- Genre: Country
- Length: 41:52
- Label: Mercury Nashville
- Producer: Dann Huff

Shane Minor is the debut studio album by American country music artist Shane Minor. It contains the singles "Slave to the Habit", "Ordinary Love", and "I Think You're Beautiful", all of which entered the Billboard Hot Country Singles & Tracks (now Hot Country Songs) charts between 1999 and 2000. It is also Minor's only studio album.

== Critical reception ==
Heather Phares of Allmusic rated the album three stars out of five and called it "a polished, accomplished debut from a promising talent." Entertainment Weekly critic Alanna Nash wrote, "With his big, impassioned vocals and layered MOR sound, Minor could be a major before year's end," giving the album a B. Jon Weisberger of Country Standard Time was less favorable, with his review calling it "about as generic as a radio-oriented country album can get."

== Track listing ==
No.	Title	Writer(s)	Length
1.	"Slave to the Habit"	Toby Keith, Chuck Cannon, Kostas	3:04
2.	"Ordinary Love"	Bob DiPiero, Craig Wiseman, Dan Truman	2:55
3.	"I Think You're Beautiful"	Maribeth Derry, Steve Diamond	3:50
4.	"I Will Be True"	Chris Difford, Rebecca Martin, Stephony Smith	3:20
5.	"A Girl Like That"	John Hobbs, Shane Minor, Mark Spiro	3:42
6.	"Change Your Mind"	Dann Huff, Minor, Spiro	4:46
7.	"Easy to Believe"	Gary Harrison, Richard Marx	4:21
8.	"Tell Me Now"	Bob Regan, George Teren	3:53
9.	"How Many Times"	Michael Bolton, Gary Burr	4:24
10.	"Too Much"	Gary Harrison, Carson Chamberlain, Keith Stegall	3:31
11.	"Silver of the Moon"	Skip Ewing, Tim Johnson	4:06

== Personnel ==
- Mike Brignardello – bass guitar
- Mark Casstevens – banjo, mandolin
- Paul Franklin – pedal steel guitar
- Aubrey Haynie – fiddle
- Dann Huff – electric guitar
- David Huff – drums
- Gordon Kennedy – electric guitar
- Terry McMillan – harmonica, percussion
- Gene Miller – background vocals
- Shane Minor – lead vocals
- Steve Nathan – piano, keyboard
- Biff Watson – acoustic guitar
