= Good Morning Beautiful (song) =

2001 single by Steve Holy

Single by Steve Holy

from the album Blue Moon
- Released: July 16, 2001
- Recorded: Summer 2000
- Genre: Country pop; soft rock
- Length: 3:30
- Label: Curb
- Songwriters: Zack Lyle; Todd Cerney
- Producer: Wilbur C. Rimes

Steve Holy singles chronology
"The Hunger" (2000)	"Good Morning Beautiful" (2001)	"I'm Not Breakin'" (2003)

Music video
- "Good Morning Beautiful" on YouTube

"Good Morning Beautiful" is a song written by Zack Lyle and Todd Cerney, and recorded by American country music artist Steve Holy. It was released in July 2001 as the fourth single from the album Blue Moon. The song slowly became a major hit, reaching No. 1 on the Billboard Hot Country Singles & Tracks chart on February 2, 2002. The song's five-week reign atop the chart was part of a 41-week chart run.

Featured in the movie Angel Eyes, "Good Morning Beautiful" was initially released as a cut from the movie's soundtrack. Following the song's chart success, "Good Morning Beautiful" was added to later presses of Holy's debut album Blue Moon.

== Personnel ==
From Blue Moon liner notes.

- Milo Deering - acoustic guitar, mandolin
- Randy Fouts - piano
- Annagrey LaBasse - background vocals
- Gary Leach - keyboards, background vocals
- Curtis Randall - bass guitar
- Marty Walsh - electric guitar
- Matthew Ward - background vocals
- Dan Wojciechowski - drums

== Chart performance ==
"Good Morning Beautiful" debuted at number 53 on the U.S. Billboard Hot Country Singles & Tracks for the chart week of July 28, 2001. The song topped Billboards Hot Country Songs chart for five consecutive weeks, beginning the week of February 2, 2002, spending a total of 41 weeks on the chart. For more than four years, it represented the only No. 1 hit for Holy, whose other songs had failed to peak any higher than No. 24 on the Country chart. That distinction ended when Holy released "Brand New Girlfriend" in 2006, which became his second No. 1 single.

=== Charts ===
Chart (2001–2002)	Peak position
US Billboard Hot 100	29
US Hot Country Songs (Billboard)	1

=== Year-end charts ===
Chart (2002)	Position
US Billboard Hot 100	84
US Country Songs (Billboard)	4

== Covers ==
Nathan Carter, a Country 'n Irish artist covered the song on his 2015 album Beautiful Life. A music video was also released featuring Carter singing the song and playing the piano while a couple are dancing in the background.
