= Steve Holy =

American country music singer (born 1972)

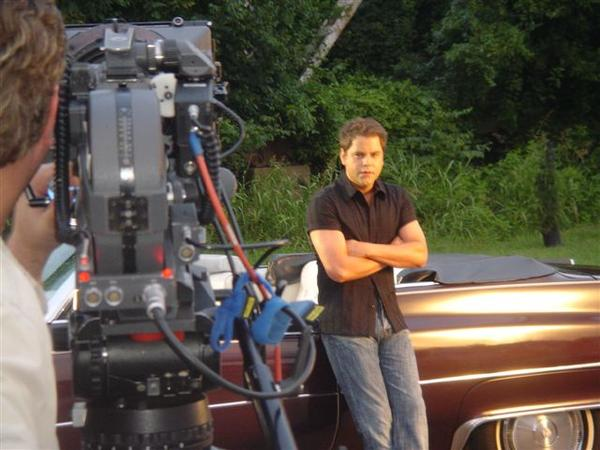
- Holy on the set of a music video shoot in 2006.

Background information
- Born: Stephen Kyle Holy; February 23, 1972 (age 53)
- Origin: Dallas, Texas, U.S.
- Genres: Country
- Occupation: Singer
- Instrument: Vocals
- Years active: 1999–present
- Labels: Curb, Thrill Hill
- Website: steveholy.com

Stephen Kyle Holy (born February 23, 1972) is an American country music singer. Signed to Curb Records since 1999, he has released three studio albums: 2000's Blue Moon, 2006's Brand New Girlfriend, and 2011's Love Don't Run. Fifteen of his singles have entered the Billboard Hot Country Songs charts, including the Number One hits "Good Morning Beautiful" (which was featured in the movie Angel Eyes) and "Brand New Girlfriend".

== Career ==
=== Early life ===
Steve was born February 23, 1972, in Dallas, Texas, as the youngest of eight children. He entered a local competition called the Mesquite Opry at age 19. While there, he caught the attention of Wilbur Rimes, the father of country singer LeAnn Rimes. By 1999, Holy was signed to Curb Records. His musical influences include Elvis Presley, Roy Orbison and Lionel Richie.

=== 1999-2002: Blue Moon ===
His first single for the label, Don't Make Me Beg, peaked at No. 29 on the Billboard country charts in 2000. By October of that year, Holy's debut album, Blue Moon, was released. Its second and third singles, which were the title track and "The Hunger", respectively, both reached No. 24 on the country charts.

Late in 2001, Holy reached Number One for the first time with "Good Morning Beautiful," a selection from the soundtrack to the film Angel Eyes. This song spent five weeks at Number One on the country charts and reached No. 29 on the Billboard Hot 100. Blue Moon eventually went Gold nine years after its release in February 2009.

=== 2002–2010: Non-album singles and Brand New Girlfriend ===
Holy released his fifth single, "I'm Not Breakin'," in late 2002. This song peaked at No. 27 on the country music charts. This was followed by four more singles over the next two years: "Rock-a-Bye Heart" at No. 37 in 2003, "Put Your Best Dress On" at No. 26 in 2004, "Go Home" and "It's My Time (Waste It If I Want To)" at No. 49 and No. 59, respectively, in 2005. None of these five singles were included on a studio album.

In 2005, Holy released "Brand New Girlfriend," co-written by Jeffrey Steele, Shane Minor and Bart Allmand. This song became Holy's second and to date final Number One on the country charts, and his first since “Good Morning Beautiful” in 2002, reaching the top of the charts in its 36th week and setting a record for the slowest climb to Number One on that chart since the inception of Nielsen SoundScan in 1990. (This record was broken one year later by Tracy Lawrence, whose "Find Out Who Your Friends Are" reached Number One in its forty-first chart week.) "Brand New Girlfriend" was the lead-off single to Holy's second studio album, also entitled Brand New Girlfriend. This album also produced the lesser Top 40 country hits "Come On Rain" and "Men Buy the Drinks (Girls Call the Shots)" at No. 35 and No. 38. Also included on the album were a cover version of Hank Williams, Jr.'s "All for the Love of Sunshine" and a song co-written by United States Senator Orrin Hatch.

A thirteenth single, "Might Have Been", was released in mid-2008 and on the chart week of December 27, 2008, debuted at No. 60 on the Hot Country Songs chart.

=== 2011–present: Love Don't Run ===
In February 2011 Holy released "Love Don't Run". The song became his first Top 20 hit on the country charts since "Brand New Girlfriend" in 2006. Holy's third studio album, also entitled Love Don't Run, was released on September 13, 2011. In 2012, Holy released "Radio Up" written by Ben Glover and Bruce Wallace. In 2013, he parted ways with Curb Records.

== Discography ==
=== Studio albums ===
Title	Album details	Peak chart positions			Certifications (sales threshold)
Title	Album details	US Country	US	US Heat	Certifications (sales threshold)
Blue Moon	Release date: October 10, 2000; Label: Curb Records; Formats: CD, cassette	7	63	1	US: Gold
Brand New Girlfriend	Release date: August 8, 2006; Label: Curb Records; Formats: CD, music download	2	19	—	
Love Don't Run	Release date: September 13, 2011; Label: Curb Records; Formats: CD, music download	30	135	—	
A Christmas to Remember	Release date: October 22, 2021; Label: Thrill Hill Records; Formats: CD, music download	—	—	—	
"—" denotes releases that did not chart

=== Compilation albums ===
Title	Album details
Best of Steve Holy	Release date: February 11, 2014; Label: Curb Records; Formats: CD, music download

=== Singles ===
Year	Single	Peak chart positions					Certifications (sales threshold)	Album
Year	Single	US Country	US Country Airplay	US	US Pop	CAN Country	Certifications (sales threshold)	Album
1999	"Don't Make Me Beg"	29	—	—	—	36		Blue Moon
2000	"Blue Moon"	24	—	—^{A}	—	47		Blue Moon
2001	"The Hunger"	24	—	—	—	*		Blue Moon
2001	"Good Morning Beautiful"	1	—	29	—	*	US: Gold	Blue Moon
2002	"I'm Not Breakin'"	27	—	—	—	*		—N/a
2003	"Rock-a-Bye Heart"	37	—	—	—	*		—N/a
2004	"Put Your Best Dress On"	26	—	—	—	—		—N/a
2005	"Go Home"	49	—	—	—	—		—N/a
2005	"It's My Time (Waste It If I Want To)"	59	—	—	—	—		—N/a
2006	"Brand New Girlfriend"	1	—	40	60	6	US: Gold	Brand New Girlfriend
2006	"Come On Rain"	35	—	—	—	—		Brand New Girlfriend
2007	"Men Buy the Drinks (Girls Call the Shots)"	38	—	—	—	—		Brand New Girlfriend
2008	"Might Have Been"	56	—	—	—	—		—N/a
2009	"Baby Don't Go"	—	—	—	—	—		Brand New Girlfriend
2011	"Love Don't Run"	19	—	78	—	—		Love Don't Run
2011	"Until the Rain Stops"	57	—	—	—	—		Love Don't Run
2012	"Hauled Off and Kissed Me"	55	55	—	—	—		Love Don't Run
2013	"Radio Up"	—	—	—	—	—		Best of Steve Holy
"—" denotes releases that did not chart * denotes unknown peak positions

- ^{A}"Blue Moon" did not enter the Hot 100, but peaked at number 20 on Bubbling Under Hot 100 Singles.

=== Music videos ===
Year	Video	Director
1999	"Don't Make Me Beg"	Sherman Halsey
2000	"Blue Moon"	Sherman Halsey
2000	"The Hunger"	chris rogers [sic]
2001	"Good Morning Beautiful"	David Abbott
2003	"Rock-a-Bye Heart"	
2004	"Put Your Best Dress On"	Deaton Flanigen
2006	"Brand New Girlfriend"	Eric Welch
2011	"Love Don't Run"	Eric Welch
