= Street of Dreams (Sofia Talvik album) =

Studio album by Sofia Talvik
- Released: 30 January 2007
- Genres: Americana; folk; indie pop
- Length: 42:54
- Label: Makaki Music
- Producer: Sofia Talvik

Sofia Talvik chronology
Blue Moon (2005)	Street of Dreams (2007)	Street of Dreamix (2007)

Street of Dreams is the second studio album by Swedish folk musician Sofia Talvik. Released in 2007, it features the single "It's Just Love", which was recorded as a duet by Talvik and Bernard Butler.

== Track listing ==
No.	Title	Length
1.	"It's Silly Now"	2:55
2.	"It's Just Love"	4:14
3.	"Running Out of You"	2:59
4.	"Mother's Way, Father's Way"	3:54
5.	"I Won the First Prize Tonight"	3:14
6.	"December"	2:41
7.	"Dominos"	4:00
8.	"Holding Your Hand"	2:38
9.	"Street of Dreams"	3:20
10.	"What Happened on the Bridge Today"	3:46
11.	"Wish"	3:33
12.	"Will You Call Me When You're Sober"	2:32
13.	"So Good to Me"	3:08
Total length:		42:54
