= Todd Cerney =

Background information
- Born: Todd David Cerney; August 8, 1953; Detroit, Michigan, United States
- Died: March 14, 2011 (aged 57) Nashville, Tennessee, United States
- Genres: Rock, blues rock, country
- Occupations: Songwriter, musician
- Instruments: Vocals, guitar, piano, mandolin, harmonica, bass guitar
- Years active: 1974–2011
- Formerly of: Kenny Rogers; Levon Helm; Dixie Chicks
- Website: toddcerney.com

Todd David Cerney (August 8, 1953 – March 14, 2011) was an American songwriter and musician.

He composed "Good Morning Beautiful", a 2002 five-week country number one (Billboard) hit for Steve Holy (co-written with Zack Lyle); "The Blues Is My Business" (co-written with Kevin Bowe), part of Etta James' 2003 Grammy Award-winning album "Let's Roll"; and "I'll Still Be Loving You", a 1987 country number one (Billboard) hit for Restless Heart (co-written with Pam Rose, Mary Ann Kennedy, and Pat Bunch). He and his co-writers were nominated for a Grammy Award for "I'll Still Be Loving You". The song won the 1988 award for "ASCAP Country Song of the Year".

Cerney was born in Detroit, Michigan, and graduated from Zanesville High School in Zanesville, Ohio in 1971. He began his song-writing career after moving to Nashville, where he initially worked at Buzz Cason's Creative Workshop recording studio as an audio engineer. Some of the earliest artists to record his songs include Steve Carlisle ("I'll Fall in Love Again") and Levon Helm ("Blue House of Broken Hearts").

== Music career ==
Cerney became known as the "Rock Doctor" after co-writing songs with members of various bands including Cheap Trick, Eddie Money, Loverboy and Bad English. Popular artists to record his compositions include Aretha Franklin (with the Four Tops) "If Ever A Love There Was" (part of the soundtrack for the film "I'm Gonna Git You Sucka" – the song hit the top 40 in both the R&B and Adult Contemporary charts (Billboard)), John Anderson's "Till I Get Used to the Pain" and Ty Herndon's "No Mercy", which peaked at #26 on the Billboard Country Music charts.

In 1988 Cerney traveled to Russia as one of 28 songwriters who participated in the Music Speaks Louder Than Words project – a collaboration between American and Soviet songwriters which included Michael Bolton and Cyndi Lauper. During his two weeks in Russia he cowrote the songs "Speak to My Heart" (performed by Phoebe Snow) and "Don't Stop Now" (performed by The Cover Girls, music by Viktor Reznikov).

In October 2009, Kenny Rogers and Dolly Parton reunited for the first time in 25 years to sing "Tell Me That You Love Me," a duet that Cerney co-wrote. The song was featured in Rogers' three-CD box set "Kenny Rogers: The First 50 Years" on Time-Life Records. In 2010, American Idol runner-up Bo Bice included a song he co-wrote with Cerney, "Keep on Rollin'," on his "3" album.

Cerney played guitar, mandolin, harmonica, keyboards and sang lead and backing vocals with various artists including backing vocals for Kenny Rogers and Levon Helm, mandolin for the Dixie Chicks and the Nashville Mandolin Ensemble and a full range of instruments for various songwriter groups including Thom Shepherd & the Nashville Songwriters Band. He also worked with three former members of the soft-rock band Bread – Jimmy Griffin, Robb Royer and Larry Knechtel – forming "Toast" (later renamed "Radio Dixie") during the mid-1990s, recording a number of songs for an album release that remained unfinished.

== Death ==
Cerney was diagnosed with melanoma in November 2010, following a brain seizure. He died at age 57 in Nashville, Tennessee on March 14, 2011.

== Chart Singles Written by Todd Cerney ==
The following is a list of Todd Cerney compositions that were chart hits.

Year	Single Title	Recording Artist	Chart Positions				
Year	Single Title	Recording Artist	Billboard Hot 100	Billboard AC	Billboard Country	Billboard R&B	Billboard Rock
1986	"Too Late" co-written with Nancy Montgomery	The Kendalls			42		
1987	"I'll Still Be Loving You" co-written with Bunch, Kennedy, and Rose	Restless Heart	33	3	1		
1987	"Notorious" co-written with Bon Jovi, Dean, Reno, and Sambora	Loverboy	38				8
1988	"Let Go" co-written with Rick Nielsen	Cheap Trick					35
1988	"If Ever a Love There Was" co-written with Pamela Phillips Oland	Four Tops		26		31	
1989	"Forget About Love" co-written with Money, Whitlock, and Zito	Eddie Money					36
1991	"Don't Stop Now" co-written with Harold Payne and Victor Reznikof	The Cover Girls	63				
2000	"No Mercy" co-written with Dennis Morgan and Stephen Allen Davis	Ty Herndon	92		26		
2001	"Good Morning Beautiful" co-written with Zack Lyle	Steve Holy	29		1		

== Awards ==
Year	Song	Award	Category	Result
1988	I'll Still Be Loving You	Grammy Awards	Best Country/Western Song	Nominated
1988	I'll Still Be Loving You	ASCAP	Country Song of the Year	Won
2002	Good Morning Beautiful	ASCAP	Most Performed Song from a Motion Picture	Won
2003	Good Morning Beautiful	ASCAP	Country Song of the Year	Nominated
