= Brand New Girlfriend (song) =

Single by Steve Holy

from the album Brand New Girlfriend
- Released: January 16, 2006
- Genre: Country
- Length: 3:39
- Label: Curb
- Songwriters: Jeffrey Steele; Shane Minor; Bart Allmand
- Producer: Lee Thomas Miller

Steve Holy singles chronology
"It's My Time (Waste It If I Want To)" (2005)	"Brand New Girlfriend" (2006)	"Come On Rain" (2006)

"Brand New Girlfriend" is a song written by Jeffrey Steele, Shane Minor and Bart Allmand, and recorded by American country music singer Steve Holy. It was released in January 2006 as the first single and title track from the album Brand New Girlfriend.

== Background ==
In an interview with CMT, Holy said that he personally connected with the song the first time that he heard it, stating that "I won't say it was my life story, but it had all my sarcasm. It was almost as if this song was written for me." Holy also indicated that he believed before he recorded the song that it would later gain significant popularity.

== Music video ==
The music video was directed by Eric Welch and premiered in late July 2006.

== Cover versions ==
Zach Seabaugh covered the song on The Voice (U.S. season 9) during the Live Playoffs round.

== Charts ==
Chart (2006)	Peak position
Canada Country (Billboard)	6
US Billboard Hot 100	40
US Hot Country Songs (Billboard)	1

=== Year-end charts ===
Chart (2006)	Position
US Country Songs (Billboard)	12

== Certifications ==
Region	Certification	Certified units/sales
United States (RIAA)	Gold	500,000^{^}
^{^} Shipments figures based on certification alone.
