= Jonestown (Sofia Talvik album) =

Studio album by Sofia Talvik
- Released: 1 July 2008
- Genre: Americana; folk; indie pop
- Length: 42:23
- Label: Makaki Music
- Producer: Sofia Talvik; Tobias Fröberg

Sofia Talvik chronology
Street of Dreamix (2007)	Jonestown (2008)	Florida (2010)

Jonestown is the third studio album by Swedish folk musician Sofia Talvik. Released in 2008, the album's title is a tribute to the 1978 Jonestown mass murder–suicide.

== Track listing ==
No.	Title	Length
1.	"As Summers Pass"	2:52
2.	"My James Dean"	4:02
3.	"At the End"	3:58
4.	"Diamonds"	2:31
5.	"Something Good"	2:57
6.	"Burning Fields"	4:05
7.	"Arms and Armour"	4:09
8.	"Clown"	2:41
9.	"Lower Case Letters"	3:49
10.	"Summer Ended Yesterday"	4:09
11.	"Prove Me Wrong"	3:07
12.	"Jonestown"	4:03
Total length:		42:23
