= Florida (Sofia Talvik album) =

Album by Sofia Talvik

Studio album by Sofia Talvik
- Released: 12 May 2010
- Genre: Americana; folk; indie pop
- Length: 33:13
- Label: Makaki Music
- Producer: Sofia Talvik

Sofia Talvik chronology
Jonestown (2008)	Florida (2010)	Florida - Acoustic (2010)

Florida is the fourth studio album by Swedish folk musician Sofia Talvik. It was released in 2010.

== Track listing ==
No.	Title	Length
1.	"King of the Willow Tree"	3:10
2.	"Florida"	2:45
3.	"As We Catch on Fire"	4:07
4.	"In the Eye of the Storm"	3:28
5.	"You Plate Your Heart with Gold"	3:53
6.	"More Than I Should Have"	2:32
7.	"Paperhouse"	3:11
8.	"The Light"	3:23
9.	"You Bring Me Back"	3:01
10.	"Maybe Then Will Be When"	3:43
Total length:		33:13

== Critical reception ==
A reviewer for CD Baby wrote: "It's not often that an album takes your breath away, and I hate to sound hyperbolic, but Florida actually has several 'Oh my god!' moments of sheer beauty."
