= Ordinary Love (Shane Minor song) =

Single by Shane Minor

from the album Shane Minor
- B-side: "How Many Times"
- Released: July 12, 1999
- Genre: Country
- Length: 2:55
- Label: Mercury
- Songwriters: Dan Truman, Bob DiPiero, Craig Wiseman
- Producer: Dann Huff

Shane Minor singles chronology
"Slave to the Habit" (1999)	"Ordinary Love" (1999)	"I Think You're Beautiful" (1999)

"Ordinary Love" is a song recorded by American country music artist Shane Minor. It was released in July 1999 as the second single from the album Shane Minor. The song reached number 24 on the Billboard Hot Country Singles & Tracks chart and number 8 on the RPM Country Tracks chart in Canada. It was written by Dan Truman of Diamond Rio along with Bob DiPiero and Craig Wiseman.

== Music video ==
The music video was directed by Steven Goldmann and premiered in July 1999. It was filmed in Montreal, Quebec, Canada.

== Chart performance ==
"Ordinary Love" debuted at number 62 on the U.S. Billboard Hot Country Singles & Tracks chart for the week of July 24, 1999.

Chart (1999)	Peak position
Canada Country Singles (RPM)	8
US Bubbling Under Hot 100 (Billboard)	11
US Hot Country Songs (Billboard)	24

=== Year-end charts ===
Chart (1999)	Position
Canada Country Tracks (RPM)	93
