= Blue Moon (Steve Holy song) =

2000 single by Steve Holy

Single by Steve Holy

from the album Blue Moon
- B-side: "Don't Make Me Beg"
- Released: April 22, 2000
- Genre: Country
- Length: 4:34; 3:47 (radio edit)
- Label: Curb
- Songwriters: Gary Leach; Mark Tinney
- Producer: Wilbur C. Rimes

Steve Holy singles chronology
"Don't Make Me Beg" (1999)	"Blue Moon" (2000)	"The Hunger" (2000)

"Blue Moon" is a song written by Gary Leach and Mark Tinney, and recorded by American country music artist Steve Holy. It was released in April 2000 as the second single and title track from his debut album Blue Moon. The song peaked at number 24 on the Billboard Hot Country Singles & Tracks chart and reached number 47 on the RPM Country Tracks chart in Canada.

== Critical reception ==
Deborah Evans Price of Billboard gave the song a negative review, calling it a "lackluster ballad that fails to help Holy distinguish himself from the pack." Price wrote that Holy "has a pleasant voice, seasoned by performing on the competitive Texas music circuit, but somehow this record just doesn't take off."

== Personnel ==
From Blue Moon liner notes.

- Rita Baloche - background vocals
- Milo Deering - steel guitar
- Randy Fouts - piano
- Annagrey LaBasse - background vocals
- Gary Leach - keyboards, background vocals
- Curtis Randall - bass guitar
- Marty Walsh - electric guitar, acoustic guitar
- Matthew Ward - background vocals
- Dan Wojciechowski - drums

== Charts ==
=== Weekly charts ===
Chart (2000)	Peak position
Canada Country Singles (RPM)	47
US Bubbling Under Hot 100 (Billboard)	20
US Hot Country Songs (Billboard)	24

=== Year-end charts ===
Chart (2000)	Position
US Country Songs (Billboard)	71
