= Shane Minor =

American singer-songwriter (born 1968)

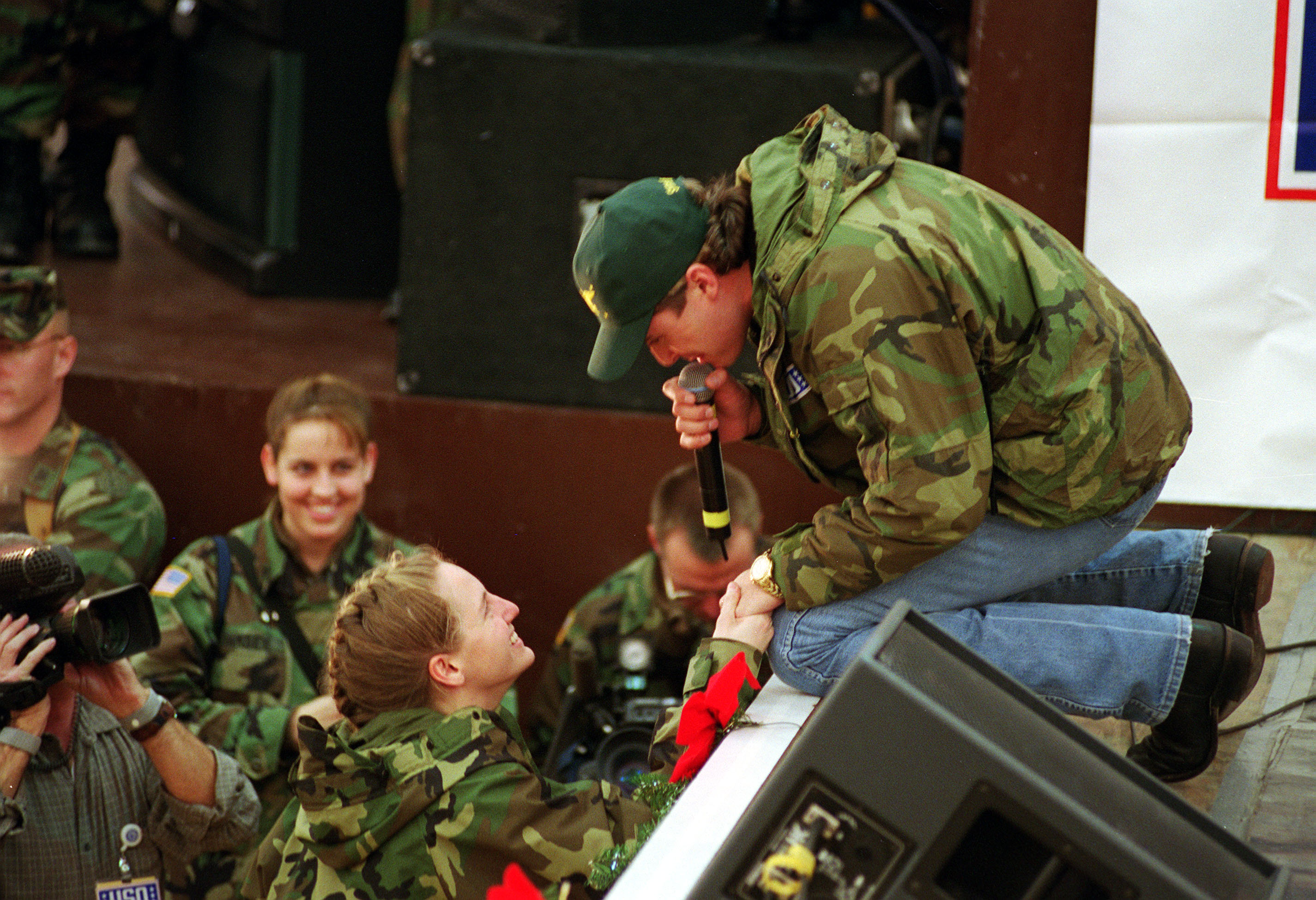
- Shane Minor singing to a US soldier at Tuzla Air Base, Bosnia and Herzegovina, in 1999.

Background information
- Born: Shane Allen Minor; May 3, 1968 (age 57)
- Origin: Modesto, California, U.S.
- Genres: Country
- Occupation: Singer-songwriter
- Instrument: Vocals
- Years active: 1999–present
- Label: Mercury Nashville

Shane Allen Minor (born May 3, 1968) is an American country music artist. Signed to Mercury Nashville Records in 1999, Minor released his self-titled album that year, and it produced three hit singles on the Billboard Hot Country Singles & Tracks charts. Although he was dropped from Mercury's roster in 2000, he has continued to write songs for other artists, including the No. 1 singles "Beautiful Mess" by Diamond Rio, "Brand New Girlfriend" by Steve Holy, and "Live a Little" by Kenny Chesney.

== Career ==
Before his recording career began, Minor was a patrol officer for the Los Angeles Police Department LAPD, as well as a rodeo bull rider. After leaving the LAPD in 1994, Minor became a singer, working small gigs throughout California, eventually recording a demo tape which was sent to producer Dann Huff.

Shane was signed to Mercury Nashville Records in 1999. His debut single, "Slave to the Habit" (co-written by Kostas, Toby Keith, and Chuck Cannon), reached number 20 on the Billboard Hot Country Singles & Tracks charts that same year. In addition, he was signed as an opening act for country pop singer Shania Twain. The album also produced the top 30 hit "Ordinary Love" and "I Think You're Beautiful". Despite the success of its first two singles, however, the album did not chart on Top Country Albums at all.

Minor left Mercury Nashville in 2000, and has not recorded any albums since. In the 2000s, he found success as a songwriter when Diamond Rio reached number 1 in 2002 with "Beautiful Mess". Minor also co-wrote several hits for other artists, including "You're in My Head" by Brian McComas, "She Thinks She Needs Me" by Andy Griggs, "Brand New Girlfriend" by Steve Holy, "International Harvester" by Craig Morgan, "Fall" by Clay Walker (which was also released by Kimberley Locke), "Keep in Mind" and "Here Comes Summer" by LoCash Cowboys, "Hell Yes I Like Beer" by Kevin Fowler, "Playing the Part" and "I Remember You" by Jamey Johnson, "His Kind of Money (My Kind of Love)" by Eric Church, "Live a Little" by Kenny Chesney, "Close Your Eyes" by Parmalee, and "Chillin' It" by Cole Swindell. Minor has penned songs for Luke Bryan, Justin Moore, Chris Young, Trace Adkins, and Rodney Atkins.

== Discography ==
=== Studio albums ===
Title	Album details
Shane Minor	Release date: April 13, 1999; Label: Mercury Nashville

=== Singles ===
Year	Single	Peak chart positions			Album
Year	Single	US Country	US	CAN Country	Album
1999	"Slave to the Habit"	20	82	8	Shane Minor
1999	"Ordinary Love"	24	111	8	Shane Minor
2000	"I Think You're Beautiful"	44	—	43	Shane Minor
"—" denotes releases that did not chart

=== Music videos ===
Year	Video	Director
1999	"Slave to the Habit"	Steven Goldmann
1999	"Ordinary Love"	Steven Goldmann
