= Blue Moon (The Marcels album) =

Studio album by The Marcels
- Released: July 1961
- Recorded: 1961
- Genre: Rock and roll
- Label: Colpix
- Producer: Stu Phillips

The Marcels chronology
Blue Moon (1961)	That Old Black Magic And 12 Other Great Songs (1963)

Singles from Blue Moon
- 1. "Blue Moon" Released: February 1961

Blue Moon is the debut studio album by the doo-wop group The Marcels. It was released in 1961 on Colpix Records and included 12 songs. The album was available in mono, catalogue number CP-416. Blue Moon was produced and arranged by Stu Phillips and recorded in New York at RCA Studios. Blue Moon features a cover version of the Judy Garland hit "Over the Rainbow". Four decades after the group's debut album was released, the Marcels were inducted into the Vocal Group Hall of Fame.

== Reception ==
Although the album Blue Moon failed to chart on the Billboard albums chart, the first single "Blue Moon" did well. The single charted at No. 1 on the Billboard Hot 100 for three weeks, charted at No. 1 on the UK Singles Chart, sold one million copies and the group was awarded a gold disc.

== Track listing ==
Side one

No.	Title	Length
1.	"Blue Moon"	2:17
2.	"Goodbye to Love"	2:35
3.	"Sweet Was the Wine"	2:10
4.	"Peace of Mind"	2:34
5.	"A Fallen Tear"	2:39
6.	"Over the Rainbow"	2:40

Side two

No.	Title	Length
7.	"I'll Be Forever Loving You"	2:21
8.	"Two People in the World"	2:22
9.	"Most of All"	2:12
10.	"Teeter Totter Love"	2:02
11.	"Sunday Kind of Love"	2:22
12.	"Crazy Bells"	2:21
