= Love Don't Run (Steve Holy song) =

Single by Steve Holy

from the album Love Don't Run
- Released: January 10, 2011
- Genre: Country
- Length: 3:41
- Label: Curb
- Songwriters: Rachel Thibodeau; Joe Leathers; Ben Glover
- Producer: Lee Thomas Miller

Steve Holy singles chronology
"Baby Don't Go" (2010)	"Love Don't Run" (2011)	"Until the Rain Stops" (2011)

"Love Don't Run" is a song written by Rachel Thibodeau, Joe Leathers and Ben Glover, and recorded by American country music singer Steve Holy. It is the fifteenth single of his career, and was released in January 2011 as the first single and title track from his album Love Don't Run.

== History ==
Rachel Thibodeau told Taste of Country that she "wanted to write a relationship song about sticking it out when times are tough". She co-wrote it with Joe Leathers and Ben Glover at Leathers' house in Rosemary Beach, Florida.

== Critical reception ==
Bobby Peacock of Roughstock gave it four-and-a-half stars out of five, saying that Holy "has never sounded any better" and praising the "straightforward" lyrics. Similarly, Janet Goodman of Engine 145 said that Holy "showcases a voice with newfound maturity", and Matthew Wilkening of Taste of Country thought that Holy sang "passionately".

== Music video ==
The music video for the song debuted on CMT.com July 22, 2011, and was directed by Eric Welch.

== Chart performance ==
Chart (2011)	Peak position
US Hot Country Songs (Billboard)	19
US Billboard Hot 100	78

=== Year-end charts ===
Chart (2011)	Position
US Country Songs (Billboard)	60
