= List of Little Witch Academia episodes =

Little Witch Academia is a 2017 anime television series created by Yoh Yoshinari and produced by Trigger, based on the original short films released in 2013 and 2015 respectively. Taking place in Luna Nova Magical Academy, a school for young witches, the series follows a new student named Atsuko "Akko" Kagari, who is determined to become a great witch like her idol named Shiny Chariot, who disappeared from the public ten years ago. After finding the mysterious staff called the Shiny Rod, Akko sets off on a journey to fully activate and properly use the Shiny Rod in hopes of finding out what truly happened to Shiny Chariot. The series was announced on June 24, 2016, following the final episode of Space Patrol Luluco, and aired in Japan from January 9 to June 25, 2017. Netflix began streaming the series' first 13 episodes with an English dub on June 30, 2017, globally while the remaining 12 was released as the show's second season on August 15, 2017. For the first thirteen episodes, the opening theme is "Shiny Ray" by YURiKA, while the ending theme is "Hoshi o Tadoreba" (星を辿れば, If You Follow the Stars) by Yuiko Ōhara. From episode fourteen onwards, the opening theme is "Mind Conductor" by YURiKA, while the ending theme is "Tōmei na Tsubasa" (透明な翼, Transparent Wings) by Ōhara. The series ran for 25 episodes released across nine Blu-ray/DVD volumes.

== Episodes ==
No.	Title (Note: English episode titles taken from Netflix where available.)	Directed by	Written by	Original release date	English air date
1	"Starting Over"; Transliteration: "Arata naru hajimari" (Japanese: 新たなるはじまり)	Yoshihiro Miyajima	Michiru Shimada	January 9, 2017	June 30, 2017
Having been inspired by a magical performance from the witch Shiny Chariot, Atsuko "Akko" Kagari decides to enroll at Luna Nova Magical Academy. Arriving in the town of Blytonbury, Akko finds the ley line which leads to Luna Nova, but she is teased by some arriving students, who mock her non-magical bloodline. Unable to fly on a broom through the ley line alone, Akko manages to get a lift from Lotte Jansson. However, since Akko was carrying salty pickled plums, she and Lotte, along with Sucy Manbavaran, end up falling out of the ley line into the forbidden Arcturus Forest. Sucy tries to lure out a giant cockatrice in order to collect one of its feathers, leading Akko to come across Shiny Chariot's staff, the Shiny Rod, summoned by her unshakeable faith in becoming a witch. As the cockatrice pursues the girls, magic astrology teacher Ursula Callistis has Akko repeat the first word^{[A]} of Arcturus and activate the Shiny Rod, allowing the girls to escape through a portal leading straight to Luna Nova. Making it just in time for the opening ceremony and avoiding expulsion, Akko, Lotte, and Sucy learn that they will be roommates for the next three years.
2	"Papiliodia"; Transliteration: "Papiriodia" (Japanese: パピリオディア)	Masato Nakazono	Michiru Shimada	January 16, 2017	June 30, 2017
While Akko is puzzled at how the Shiny Rod really works, Sucy reveals to Lotte that she originally came to Luna Nova because the academy has samples of extinct poisonous mushrooms for her to collect. Akko begins her first day of magic lessons at Luna Nova, but the classes do not turn out to be as glamorous as she thought they would be. In addition, she has her first clash with top student Diana Cavendish over their diverging views towards Shiny Chariot. While Akko later ponders over Shiny Chariot's unexplained disappearance ten years ago, Diana attempts to revive the academy's Jennifer Memorial Tree, which has been declining due to lack of nutrients, but her restoration spell reveals parasitic growths feeding off its roots. From the Shiny Chariot trading cards she had collected in her childhood, Akko recognizes these growths as the pupae of the Pappiliodya, an extremely rare species of magical butterflies, and manages to stop Diana before she can obliterate the cocoons. Using a spell listed in her trading card and some pronunciation help from Diana, Akko manages to use the Shiny Rod to successfully hatch the Pappiliodya, although the teachers assume Diana is the one responsible.
3	"Don't Stop Me Now"	Keisuke Shinohara	Kimiko Ueno	January 23, 2017	June 30, 2017
Ursula gives an official broom to Akko, who is determined to return the Shiny Rod back to Shiny Chariot when they finally meet. Despite struggling to fly her broom properly during flight magic class, Akko becomes eager to enter the school's traditional broom relay race after learning Shiny Chariot was one of the winners. Later, Akko goes with Lotte to a magic item café, where they come across a legendary broom known as the Shooting Star that has been sealed off for being too temperamental. Interested in the relay race's prize offerings, Lotte and Sucy decide to implement various training tactics on Akko. On the day of the relay race, Sucy uses her concoctions to give her team an early start and Akko an alternate means of using her broom. Meanwhile, Amanda O'Neill selfishly steals the Shooting Star, only for it to break loose and run wild, soon running into Akko. After being dragged around the world and shaken off, Akko manages to take hold of the Shooting Star and catch up to Diana, only to fall off again when it breaks its seal and flies away, leading Akko's team to finish in second place.
4	"Night Fall"; Transliteration: "Naito Fōru" (Japanese: ナイトフォール)	Yūichi Shimodaira	Nanami Higuchi	January 30, 2017	June 30, 2017
As the girls are given supplement training as punishment for stealing a tart during the night, prohibiting them from leaving school grounds, Lotte becomes depressed as it leaves her unable to go in town to attend the release of the latest volume in her favorite book series, Night Fall. Akko and Sucy manage to sneak Lotte aboard a potato delivery bus traveling in town after they hear her passion for the series and desire to meet the author, Annabel Crème. During an event in which Annabel makes her first public appearance, Lotte takes part in a trivia battle and manages to win Annabel's fountain pen. It is at this point that Annabel, allegedly the twelfth author in the series to use the pen name, disappears after declaring that Lotte will be the next author to write Night Fall. Feeling that she would rather support what Annabel does rather than become her, Lotte consults the faerie residing in the fountain pen, soon finding Annabel near some hydrangeas. Although Annabel has been doubting her literary abilities due to critical reviews, Lotte motivates Annabel to continue writing after bringing up the positive attributes of the book series.
5	"Pact of the Dragon"; Transliteration: "Rūna Nova to shiroi ryū" (Japanese: ルーナノヴァと白い龍)	Kōji Aritomi	Yū Satō; Masahiko Ōtsuka	February 6, 2017	June 30, 2017
While being forced to clean the academy's tower following an argument in magic pharmaceutics class, Akko and Amanda witness a horde of dragons flying off with the Sorcerer's Stone, leaving Luna Nova without any magical power. Strangely, the academy staff does not react to this theft, instead accidentally revealing that this is part of an anticipated prophecy involving a dragon. Akko, Amanda, and their friends head to the nearby Rastavan Ruins, after hearing a legend about a white dragon who resides there, in order to retrieve the Sorcerer's Stone themselves. They discover the culprit to be a loan shark dragon named Fafnir, who has repossessed the Sorcerer's Stone from Luna Nova after their failure to keep up repayments on a loan that he gave them. Luckily, Diana is able to decipher Fafnir's promissory note, written in dragon script, revealing that it does not actually mention paying back interest. This means that Fafnir has been tricking the academy staff into paying back more than they actually owed. Caught in his deception, Fafnir is forced into nullifying the contract and returning the Sorcerer's Stone to Luna Nova.
6	"The Fountain"; Transliteration: "Porarisu no izumi" (Japanese: ポラリスの泉)	Yoshihiro Miyajima	Michiru Shimada	February 13, 2017	June 30, 2017
After magic numerology class, Akko is forced to practice metamorphosis magic in her room. Meanwhile, Luna Nova hosts a welcoming party for Earl Paul Hanbridge and his son Viscount Andrew Hanbridge, who is formally acquainted with Diana. After giving herself rabbit ears during her practice, Akko decides to search for the Fountain of Polaris, believing it can grant her great power. Akko soon comes across Andrew, who expresses a strong disinterest in magic, and she inadvertently gives him rat ears and a tail. As Akko and Andrew arrive at the entrance to the Fountain of Polaris, they are chased by its guardian, a giant polar bear named Arcas. They are able to evade Arcas with the unseen aid of Ursula. Approaching the fountain, Akko is shown a vision of a young Shiny Chariot, who was unable to receive the fountain's power until she proved herself to be a capable witch through her own effort. Helping Akko to realize that acknowledgement is something that must be earned, Ursula encourages Akko to become stronger and restores Andrew, who promises to keep their encounter a secret. Upon departing from Luna Nova, Paul confides in Andrew that he is planning to shut it down.
7	"Orange Submariner"; Transliteration: "Orenji sabumarinā" (Japanese: オレンジサブマリナー)	Hideyuki Satake	Kimiko Ueno	February 20, 2017	June 30, 2017
Akko studies hard for her exams, but still struggles to get decent grades despite Ursula's tutorage. After getting into a fight with Diana's friends Hannah England and Barbara Parker, Akko is threatened with expulsion from Luna Nova should she fail her final exam, which requires an understanding of fish language. While attempting to bribe the fish magic philosophy teacher Pisces by pouring mineral water in her fishbowl, Akko accidentally drops her down a drain into the school's sewage system. Transforming into another anthropomorphic fish to search for Pisces, Akko comes across a sad fish and impulsively uses her emergency magic reserve to free its family and Pisces from a poacher's fish trap. When Akko is once again faced with expulsion for her actions, Pisces gives her an A+ in her exam for rescuing the fish family. Ursula vouches that, despite the gap between Akko and her classmates, Akko's magic has improved considerably since her enrollment. After the rescued fish family is discovered to be an endangered species, Akko is forgiven from expulsion, but she is still punished with giving her room a spotless cleaning with help from her friends.
8	"Akko's Adventure in Sucyworld"; Transliteration: "Nemureru yume no Sūshii" (Japanese: 眠れる夢のスーシィ)	Masato Nakazono	Kimiko Ueno	February 27, 2017	June 30, 2017
After drinking her own ominous energy drink formula, Sucy winds up in a deep sleep with endless mushrooms growing around her body. Unable to ask for a teacher's help out of fear of expulsion, Akko has Lotte send her into Sucy's dreams in hopes of finding out how to cure Sucy. Enlisting the help of small angel and devil versions of Sucy, Akko encounters several different personality aspects of Sucy in her search for the original Sucy, only to get caught up in a purge of Sucy's unneeded emotions in a courtroom. After stopping the execution, Akko rescues a timid Sucy, hitchhiking to a drive-in cinema showcasing Sucy's memories of Akko. As mushrooms start exponentially growing from Lotte's hands and destroying the academy, the timid Sucy devours the other Sucys and transforms into a bloodthirsty monster that threatens to overtake the original Sucy. After rushing to find the original Sucy in an apartment and attempting to wake her up by feeding her antidotes via mouth-to-mouth, Akko wakes up from what was apparently her own dream.
9	"Undead Travelogue"; Transliteration: "Buraitonberī andeddo kikō" (Japanese: ブライトンベリーアンデッド紀行)	Dai Seki	Nanami Higuchi	March 6, 2017	June 30, 2017
While trying to fix some tombstones that she knocked over while at a graveyard in town, Akko accidentally mixes a repair spell with one of Sucy's mushrooms, ultimately bringing a deceased soldier back from the dead. Akko, Lotte, and Sucy find themselves chasing the soldier across town seeking revenge on a coward despite his amnesia. After visiting the proprietor in the magical item café, the girls discover that the coward was a bell-ringer who allegedly broke a promise to his witch daughter Miranda Holbrooke. Upon visiting the town's clock tower missing its bell's clapper, the soldier remembers that he is in fact the bell-ringer, who gave Miranda an amulet made from the bell's clapper before he died. Realizing that the Miranda in question is actually Luna Nova's headmistress, Akko uses the repair spell on the bell to rush everyone back to Luna Nova and reunite Miranda with her father, allowing them to spend some time together before the resurrection spell wears off and the soldier returns to the afterlife. However, since Akko, Lotte, and Sucy illegally resurrected the dead, Miranda gives them the minor punishment of fixing all the broken brooms kept in the stockroom.
10	"Bee Affection"; Transliteration: "Hachi sawagi" (Japanese: 蜂騒ぎ)	Saori Tachibana	Michiru Shimada	March 12, 2017	June 30, 2017
Hearing from Hannah and Barbara about a formal party at Andrew's mansion that Diana is personally invited to attend, Akko, Lotte, and Sucy don magical Cinderella dresses purchased from the magical item café and sneak into the formal party. Just as Andrew notices them and prepares to send them out, a mischievous Sucy sets loose a Cupid Bee that cause whoever it stings to fall in love with the first person they see. Andrew and Diana are each stung by the Cupid Bee, causing them both to fall in love with Akko and pursue her. While searching for the Cupid Bee in order to stop the spell using Sucy's fan flyswatter, Akko overhears Paul telling Andrew to quit playing the piano and chase all the witches out of the country. After receiving encouragement from Akko to keep chasing his dreams, Andrew plays "Flight of the Bumblebee" on the piano to distract the other guests so that Akko can chase the Cupid Bee and finally swat it on Paul's forehead, finally undoing its magic. Back in their room, Lotte and Sucy tease Akko to see if she had any feelings for Andrew.
11	"Blue Moon"; Transliteration: "Burū mūn" (Japanese: ブルームーン)	Yūichi Shimodaira	Michiru Shimada	March 19, 2017	June 30, 2017
Late at night, Ursula does not say much about Shiny Chariot's disappearance to Akko. Meanwhile, Diana discovers from a book in the Reference Archives that the Nine Olde Witches sealed an ancient power known as the Grand Triskellion in Arcturus Forest centuries ago, but it can only be released when the Shiny Rod activates the Seven Words of Arcturus. Recalling a legend about an ancient ghost who only appears on the night of a blue moon, Akko takes the Shiny Rod with her to a cave underneath a chapel known as the Blue Moon Abyss. After reaching deep inside the Blue Moon Abyss, Akko confronts the ghost, who offers to grant her dream of becoming a witch like Shiny Chariot in exchange for her past memories. Determined to see her dream come true through her own strength, Akko awakens the second word^{[B]} from the Shiny Rod to destroy the ghost. After Akko passes out, Ursula, revealed to be Shiny Chariot herself, speaks with her mentor Woodward, who was disguised as the ghost. Explaining that Akko has already activated two of the seven words required to break the seal, Woodward tasks Ursula with guiding Akko to activate the rest.
12	"What You Will"	Yoshihiro Miyajima	Michiru Shimada	March 26, 2017	June 30, 2017
As Luna Nova prepares for their annual Samhain Festival, during which the most exemplary student is crowned the Moonlit Witch, each team leader picks an assignment for the festival. Unfortunately, Akko's team is stuck playing symbolic sacrifices for an ever-sorrowful ghost known as Vajarois. Determined to become the Moonlit Witch like Shiny Chariot was, despite her friends' low expectations of her, Akko is later mocked by a mischievous magic mirror, which turns her into an exact likeness of Diana. Although initially eager to pull pranks on Hannah and Barbara while in this form, Akko quickly becomes aware of how responsible and talented Diana is. When the real Diana arrives and turns Akko back to normal, Akko becomes dejected. Encouraged by Ursula to focus on what she can do instead of comparing herself to others, Akko is once again called to the Fountain of Polaris, which shows her a vision of Shiny Chariot through the perspective of one of her friends. Realizing that Shiny Chariot cared more about simply bringing joy to others with her magic rather than striving to be the Moonlit Witch, Akko figures out what she can do for the festival.
13	"Samhain Magic Festival"; Transliteration: "Samuhain no mahō" (Japanese: サムハインの魔法)	Hideyuki Satake	Michiru Shimada	April 2, 2017	June 30, 2017
Wanting to follow Shiny Chariot's example, Akko proposes putting on a show using metamorphosis magic to make Vajarois cry from laughter, which prompts Ursula to look into what caused the grief of Vajarois in the first place. Initially unwilling to get on board with Akko's plan, Lotte and Sucy notice how hard Akko is working to make magic fun and decide to help her in her act. On the day of the festival, Akko transforms into various animals to try to entertain Vajarois, while Lotte and Sucy assist in the sky. Meanwhile, Ursula finds a nutshell plaque called Vajarois's Vestige stored in the Reference Archives. Ursula learns that Vajarois was a princess who had swallowed the Seed of Sorrow to remember her lost friends, causing her to experience eternal grief. Akko, Lotte, and Sucy are swallowed inside Vajarois after receiving this information. Activating the third word,^{[C]} Akko uses the Shiny Rod to extract the Seed of Sorrow out of Vajarois, allowing her true form to rest in peace. Akko celebrates her success, despite being disqualified from the running for Moonlit Witch. Another figure using cube-like devices silently observes from afar.
14	"New Age Magic"; Transliteration: "Nyū eiji majikku" (Japanese: ニューエイジマジック)	Masato Nakazono	Kimiko Ueno	April 9, 2017	August 15, 2017
The worker faeries of Luna Nova form a labor union and abandon their duties until they get a fairer share of energy from the Sorcerer's Stone. A new teacher named Croix Meridies arrives to teach modern magic class, demonstrating her flying roomba-like Sorcery Units. Akko ultimately sides with the faerie labor union in their strike. As the faerie labor union tries to negotiate terms with the academy staff, Croix proposes her new Sorcery Solution System (SSS), which creates new energy out of wasted energy emitted from the Sorcerer's Stone, but it is met with refusal for its modern technology. When a flame faerie is attacked while helping Hannah and Barbara take a bath, the strike suddenly worsens. Akko, Lotte, and Sucy are allowed clearance to the Sorcerer's Stone, but they are attacked by a mechanical faerie. Croix uses her magitronic tablet to absorb the anger out of the faerie labor union, heal the flame faerie and solve the energy crisis. The academy staff allow Croix to install the SSS, but they are unaware that she secretly orchestrated the faerie labor union to further her plans. Upon returning from an errand, Ursula is shocked to see Akko getting along with Croix.
15	"Chariot of Fire"; Transliteration: "Chariotto obu faia" (Japanese: チャリオット・オブ・ファイア)	Yūsuke Suzuki	Michiru Shimada	April 16, 2017	August 15, 2017
In modern magic class, Croix explains how a ley line router works, impressing all students except Diana. Upon hearing that Shiny Chariot and Croix were former classmates, Akko goes to Croix, who reveals that Shiny Chariot's real name is Chariot du Nord. Croix invites Akko to her laboratory in the New Moon Tower to analyze the Shiny Rod. However, Croix ends up knocking Akko unconscious and begins examining the data in her memories in order to figure out how she is able to control the Shiny Rod. Meanwhile, Ursula fights her way through the defenses of the New Moon Tower. Croix then merely takes her leave, claiming that she did not gain any new information from the data. After bringing Akko to safety, Ursula explains that the Grand Triskellion was sealed away in the Arcturus Forest, having the power to restore the flow of magic to the world. The key to breaking this seal is to unlock the seven words magically hidden in the Shiny Rod, three of which Akko has already learned. Although unaware that Ursula and Shiny Chariot are the same person, Akko becomes determined to activate the remaining four words in hopes of meeting Shiny Chariot again.
16	"Pohjola's Ordeal"; Transliteration: "Pohoyora no shiren" (Japanese: ポホヨラの試練)	Yoshinari Suzuki	Kimiko Ueno	April 23, 2017	August 15, 2017
After learning from Ursula and the Shiny Rod that she needs to find something that she is lacking in order to unlock the fourth word, Akko joins Lotte and Sucy as they visit a magic item café owned by Lotte's parents at a remote town in Finland. The next morning, Akko, Lotte, and Sucy discover that Lotte's parents have become infected with the rare Greenman Disease from eating baked hapansilakka pies made from local herring, which will gradually turn them into moss until they wither away. Needing five particular ingredients to make an antidote, the girls set off in search for them, but Akko's lack of patience proves to be an issue. When Lotte and Sucy also succumb to the Greenman Disease, only Akko is left to get the remaining ingredients and is forced to learn patience in order to deal with collecting droppings from a spooked reindeer and motivating a self-doubtful yeti artisan to make a medicine capsule. Realizing the importance of patience, Akko manages to unlock the Shiny Rod's fourth word^{[D]} and blend all the ingredients together, thus finishing the antidote and restoring everyone back to normal.
17	"Amanda O'Neill and the Holy Grail"; Transliteration: "Amanda Onīru ando hōrī gureiru" (Japanese: アマンダ・オニール・アンド・ホーリー・グレイル)	Yoshiyuki Kaneko	Yū Satō; Masahiko Ōtsuka	April 30, 2017	August 15, 2017
Learning from Ursula that old history and traditions are the clues needed to unlock the fifth word, Akko and Amanda sneak into Appleton Academy, known for its disdain for witches, in search for a chalice known as the Holy Grail. As Amanda and Akko respectively disguise themselves as a student and a rat, Amanda has a heated run-in with the chairman's son Louis Blackwell, before they both come across Andrew, who refuses to disclose the whereabouts of the Holy Grail. Akko finds the Holy Grail stored inside a chest after following the cube-like devices known as Pixels, but Louis captures Amanda and Akko, intending to destroy the Holy Grail. However, Andrew proposes that Louis and Amanda settle this dispute in a duel of swords, in which Amanda proves victorious. After Louis spitefully smashes the Holy Grail, the Pixels possess a suit of armor and forcefully take control of Louis by placing onto him. With help from Akko and Andrew, Amanda manages to regain control of her magic and defeat the suit of armor, freeing Louis in the process. After Louis takes responsibility for the whole incident, Akko and Amanda return to Luna Nova, unaware of Croix's involvement.
18	"Stanship Take Off!"; Transliteration: "Kūchū daisensō sutanshippu" (Japanese: 空中大戦争スタンシップ)	Yūichi Shimodaira	Nanami Higuchi	May 7, 2017	August 15, 2017
An annual ghost-hunting event known as the Wild Hunt is coming to Blytonbury for its final stage. Akko offers to help silent tech genius Constanze Amalie von Braunschbank Albrechtsberger, who was invited by Croix to participate in the Wild Hunt. Though since Akko wrecked one of the Stanbots, Constanze's robotic helpers, Constanze refuses to receive help from Akko, preferring to work alone. However, Akko eventually proves herself worthy as a partner when gathering the necessary supplies to assemble the Stanship, Constanze's flying battleship. At night, Croix sends a viral post to occult fanatics concerning ghost sightings in town. As the final stage of the Wild Hunt commences early next morning, Croix uses her Pixels to materialize the ghosts into a large crow beast wreaking havoc. Having adapted Akko's suggestion for her own design, Constanze transforms the Stanship into a mecha called the Magic Knight Grand Charion, managing to defeat the crow beast with magical support from the Wild Hunters. Ursula soon confronts Croix, figuring out that she caused a commotion to experiment with human emotional energy in order to gauge the "fuel spirit". Out of gratitude, Constanze personally gives Akko a mechanical broom to fly on.
19	"Cavendish"; Transliteration: "Kyabendisshu" (Japanese: キャベンディッシュ)	Tatsumi Fujii	Michiru Shimada; Nanami Higuchi	May 14, 2017	August 15, 2017
Akko learns from Hannah and Barbara that Diana is leaving Luna Nova at midnight to become the head of the Cavendish family. Before Diana departs, Akko is irritated by the fact that their rivalry was one-sided, but she is surprised that Diana researched all about the seven words. Akko refuses to accept that Diana simply left despite their past differences, deciding to head straight to the Cavendish manor in Wedinburgh to change Diana's mind, joining up with Andrew and Paul along the way. Once there, Diana's maid Anna grooms and dresses Akko, explaining that Diana must become the head of the Cavendish family to keep it from falling into ruin under her aunt Daryl Cavendish. At a dinner party that night, Daryl attempts to sell off Cavendish heirlooms to the Hanbridge family. This includes a candle holder made with mermaid scales, a mythril chess set and the tapestry of Beatrix the Affectionate, who was Diana's ancestor and one of the Nine Olde Witches. Angered at Daryl's sacrilege against her family's history and traditions, Diana states her clear intention to go through with her ascension and protect the family heritage from Daryl's greed.
20	"Intellect and Sensibility"; Transliteration: "Chisei to kansei" (Japanese: 知性と感性)	Yoshihiro Miyajima	Michiru Shimada; Nanami Higuchi	May 21, 2017	August 15, 2017
As Diana prepares for her ascension ceremony, which occurs once every few years during a Venus eclipse, she is constrained by Daryl's pet serpents. Meanwhile, Andrew tells Akko that Diana lost her magical abilities during childhood until something rekindled her determination. Akko and Andrew then overhear Daryl talking to her daughters Maril and Merrill Cavendish about her scheme to stop Diana from performing the ceremony. Akko decides to enter the Cavendish shrine and rescue Diana, only to get poisoned by the serpents in the process. Diana takes Akko away for treatment despite being free to carry on with the ceremony, revealing her determination to continue the legacy of Beatrix as a benefactor to humanity. By firmly believing that Diana can still become the head of the family and return to the academy, Akko unlocks the fifth word.^{[E]} This allows them to fly back to the shrine in time. Daryl, Maril, and Merrill turn into trees after attempting to disturb the ceremony, but Diana chooses to save them and ultimately misses the ascension. In turn, Diana receives a vision of Beatrix for her compassion. Anna later encourages Diana to pursue her true dreams and return with Akko to Luna Nova.
21	"Discipline"; Transliteration: "Wagandia" (Japanese: ワガンディア)	Takumi Shinoda	Michiru Shimada	May 28, 2017	August 15, 2017
Looking into the meaning behind the sixth word, Akko hears from Croix about how Chariot climbed a legendary tree called Wagandea to discover it. Unfortunately, Ursula urges Akko to refrain from doing this, due to a dangerous pollen released that is poisonous to witches. Despite this, Croix takes Akko to Wagandea anyway. While Akko begins climbing Wagandea, Ursula rushes to her safety, only to be ambushed by Croix. It is revealed that Croix has held a grudge against Chariot for being chosen as the first owner of the Shiny Rod. When Ursula attempts to stop Akko from climbing Wagandea any further, Akko expresses her sudden distrust in Ursula. After Croix surprisingly prevents Ursula from falling to her death, Ursula rushes to rescue Akko just as the pollen is released. Realizing just how much Ursula has watched over her, Akko expresses her deepest apology and gratitude towards Ursula. This turns out to be the true meaning behind the sixth word,^{[F]} unlocking a new power that heals Ursula's injuries. However, Croix has created the Noir Rod, a replica of the Shiny Rod composed of Pixels, planning to break the seal of the Grand Triskellion herself.
22	"The Things We Said Today"; Transliteration: "Shario to kurowa" (Japanese: シャリオとクロワ)	Hideyuki Satake	Kimiko Ueno; Michiru Shimada	June 4, 2017	August 15, 2017
Andrew and Paul hear news reporting a feud between nations about a controversial soccer verdict threatening to erupt into an international conflict. Meanwhile, Ursula tells Akko that the seventh word lies within her heart in order to find it. Diana notifies Akko to meet in town with Andrew, who returns her witch hat previously left in his limo. However, she notices some Pixels hovering around the rioters, soon coming across Croix on top of a building. Akko discovers that Croix has been manipulating people's emotions in order to convert them into noir fuel spirit, magical energy fueled by negative human emotions. Just as Akko is attacked by Croix, Akko is saved by Ursula, whose identity as Chariot is finally revealed in the process. Croix further reveals that Chariot drained dream fuel spirit, dreaming power converted into magical power, from her attendees during her magic show ten years ago. This deprived Akko of her natural magical abilities since that time. When Ursula denies none of this, Akko is left devastated.
23	"Yesterday"	Shigeki Awai	Masahiko Ōtsuka	June 11, 2017	August 15, 2017
In the past, Chariot became a performer to spread happiness with her magic from the Shiny Rod while in search of the seventh word. When her magic acts were demanded more entertainment, Ursula was tricked into using Croix's research of dream fuel spirit at the show which Akko attended. Upon learning that Croix's technique stole magic from spectators, Chariot's performance without relying on it led to her inadvertently destroying part of the moon, causing Chariot to lose the right to use the Shiny Rod and disappear from the public eye. In the present, Diana learns from Lotte and Sucy that Akko has not returned home. Having deduced that Ursula's true identity is Chariot, Diana goes out and searches for Akko, managing to find her totally depressed. Inside the magic item café, Akko is shown a premium Shiny Chariot card by Diana, who reveals that she was also a fan of Chariot and had attended that same show. Despite losing her magical abilities as a result, Diana's admiration for Chariot gave her the determination to regain her magic abilities through perseverance. Diana tells Akko that she is better suited to live up to Chariot's ideals, thus restoring Akko's happiness.
24	"A Road to Arcturus"; Transliteration: "Arukuturusu e no michi" (Japanese: アルクトゥルスへの道)	Masato Nakazono	Masahiko Ōtsuka	June 18, 2017	August 15, 2017
In the laboratory, Ursula is unable to stop Croix from activating the Noir Rod, which manages to disable all magic across the country. As Croix takes the Noir Rod to Arcturus Forest, Akko and her friends also end up there after the magic goes out in the ley line. Croix uses the Noir Rod to unseal the Grand Triskellion, only to discover that it is just a twig wand capable of casting simple magic. Suddenly, the Noir Rod goes berserk due to the uncontrollable emotions from the rioters and attacks Croix in its dragon form. Ursula is devoured by the Noir Rod when trying to defend Croix. However, Akko arrives with her friends and destroys the Noir Rod using the Shiny Rod's first word, saving Ursula in the process. After making amends with Ursula, Akko realizes that she must follow her own path in order to become a proper witch. This emotional moment awakens the Shiny Rod's seventh and final word,^{[G]} allowing Akko to utilize the true power of the Grand Triskellion and revitalize Arcturus Forest. While Akko and her friends celebrate, some of the leftover Pixels from the Noir Rod attach themselves to an Intercontinental ballistic missile (ICBM).
25	"Changing at the Edge of the World"; Transliteration: "Koto no ha no ki" (Japanese: 言の葉の樹)	Yoshihiro Miyajima	Masahiko Ōtsuka	June 25, 2017	August 15, 2017
Ursula, Croix, and the girls learn that the remnants of the Noir Rod have taken control of the ICBM that threatens to destroy Great Britain's rivaled nation due to Croix's app that absorbs angry spirit energy. Unable to stop the Noir Missile by conventional means, Akko and her friends bundle their flight magic with the Shiny Rod's fifth word, working it like a multistage rocket to catch up with the Noir Missile. Incidentally, the effort of the girls is broadcast around the world. Many people witness the witches' bravery and believe that they can stop this menace, which fuels their magic to the maximum. Despite the Noir Missile putting up a hard fight, Akko and Diana are saved by the return of the legendary broom, the Shooting Star. With the collective fuel spirit of the Grand Triskellion, they use the enhanced power of the Shiny Rod's first word to destroy the Noir Missile, magically spreading happiness across the world. Having fulfilled its duty, the Shiny Rod disappears. In the aftermath, Croix, before going into custody, promises to dedicate herself into finding a cure for the Wagandea's curse on Ursula, and Akko finally manages to fly on her broom.

== Notes ==
The seven transformations of the Shiny Rod as they appear in the anime series:

A. Shiny Arc: First introduced in episode 1. After the wielder chants the first word of Arcturus, "Noctu Orfei Aude Fraetor" ("Strive for your ideal place"), the Shiny Rod transforms into a bow and arrow, which can open portals that allow travel through the ley lines and can decimate a monster upon hitting its mark.
B. Shiny Ax: First introduced in episode 11. After the wielder chants the second word of Arcturus, "Phaidoari Afairynghor" ("You do not get the things that you dream of, you get the things you work for"), the Shiny Rod transforms into a great ax which can be used to launch a frontal attack, strong enough to damage Woodward's monstrous form.
C. Grappling Hook: First introduced in episode 13. After the wielder chants the third word of Arcturus, "Arae Aryrha" ("Do not compare yourself with others, do what only you can do"), the Shiny Rod transforms into a grappling hook that can be used to hold and pull large objects.
D. Shiny Sprinkler: First introduced in episode 16. After the wielder chants the fourth word of Arcturus, "Mayenab Dysheebudo" ("To see it through, patience is important"), the Shiny Rod transforms into a sprinkler that can quickly mix and spray any liquid.
E. Shiny Balai: First introduced in episode 20. After the wielder chants the fifth word of Arcturus, "Sybilladura Lelladybura" ("When traditional and modern powers mingle, the gate to an unseen world will open"), the Shiny Rod transforms into a magic broom which has incredible speed.
F. Lyonne: First introduced in episode 21. After the wielder chants the sixth word of Arcturus, "Lyonne" ("Thank you"), the Shiny Rod releases a powerful healing spell.
G. Grand Triskellion-Claiomh Solais: First introduced in episode 24. After the wielder chants the seventh word of Arcturus, "Phasansheer Shearylla" ("Connect with other people, and your dreams will grow"), the Shiny Rod can merge with the Grand Triskellion and form a golden cross, being able to use world-altering magic and improve previous transformations.
