= Sofia Talvik =

Swedish singer-songwriter

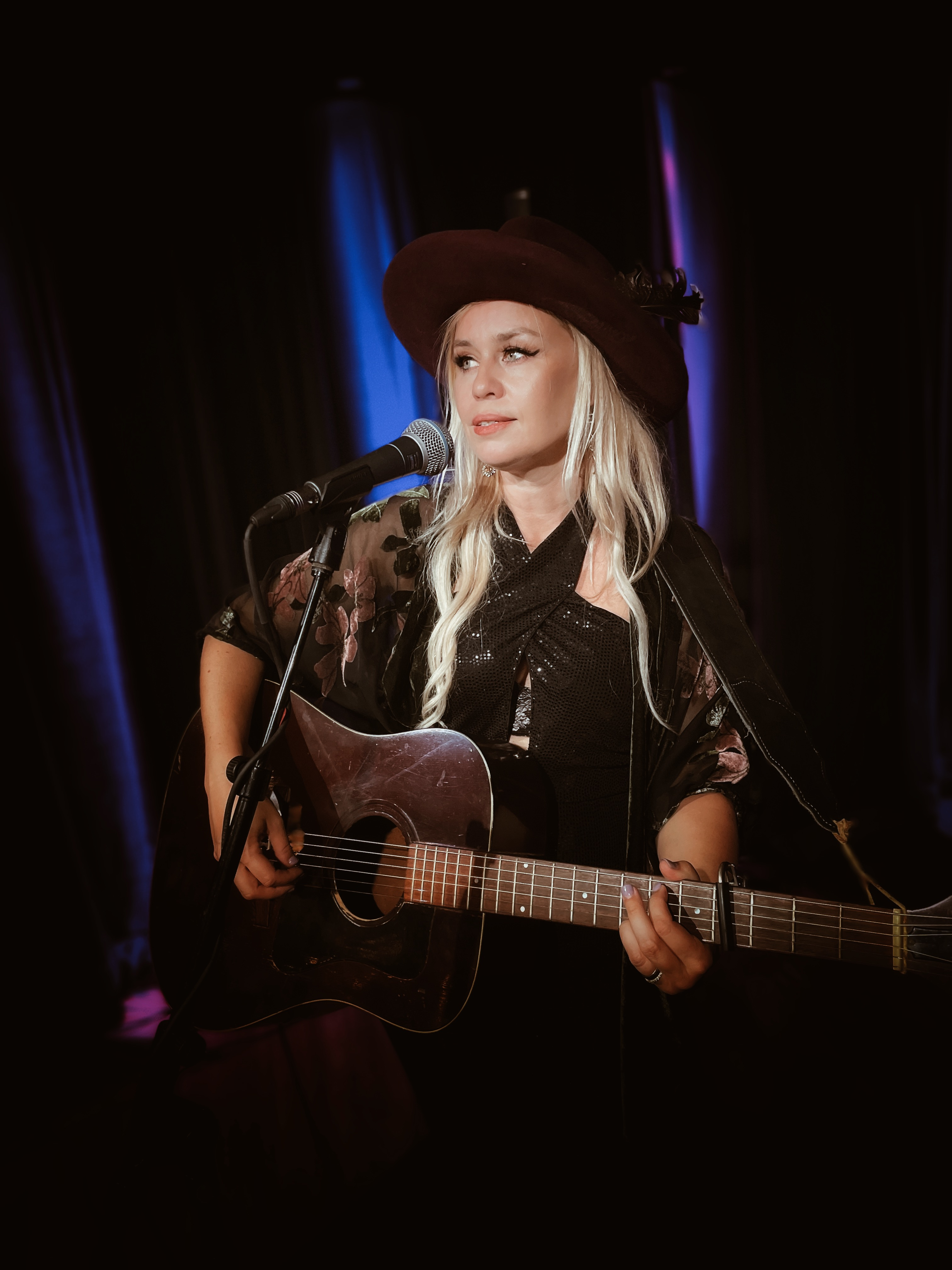
- Talvik in 2023

Background information
- Born: Sofia Karolina Talvik; 24 November 1978 (age 47)
- Origin: Gothenburg, Västra Götaland County, Sweden
- Genres: Americana; Folk; Indie Folk
- Occupation: Singer-songwriter
- Instruments: Vocals; guitar; piano
- Years active: 2004–present
- Label: Makaki Music
- Website: www.sofiatalvik.com

Sofia Talvik (born 24 November 1978 in Gothenburg, Västra Götaland County) is a Swedish musician and singer-songwriter. Her music can be described as Folk and Americana with Nordic influences. She plays the guitar and piano. Her album productions also include musicians who play other acoustic instruments, including violins, cellos, accordion and mandolin.

== Career ==
Talvik released her debut album, Blue Moon, in 2005. It was recorded and produced entirely by Talvik herself, taking just 40 hours to record.

Her second album, Street of Dreams, was released in 2007, and features Bernard Butler, guitarist in former British band Suede on the track "It's Just Love", the first single to be released from the album. Talvik had been looking for a partner with whom to duet on the single, and contacted Butler via MySpace while working on the album.

Her third album, Jonestown, was released at the end of August 2008 and is the second album released on her own record label Makaki Music. The album and title track are named after the sanctuary built by the cult Peoples Temple (founded by pastor Jim Jones), where over 900 people committed suicide. Jonestown was produced by Swedish artist Tobias Fröberg who also produced Peter Morén from Peter Bjorn and John.

In August 2008, Talvik became the first Swedish female artist to play the Lollapalooza festival in Chicago, Illinois. Florida is Sofia Talvik's fourth album, which was released in May 2010, and was partially written during a time when Talvik lived in Orlando, Florida, though it was recorded back in Stockholm, Sweden.

In 2010, Talvik (along with Wille Crafoord and Mange Schmidt) performed an official song for the Swedish election, supporting the Prime Minister and the leading Swedish party Moderaterna. During 2011, Sofia Talvik released four EPs that formed the project L.O.V.E. Another project called H.A.T.E, (four rock bands covering each of the EPs) was also released alongside L.O.V.E. The participating bands were Ball of Mayhem, UK, and G.A.I.N, Badmouth and Akribi from Sweden. All the releases in the L.O.V.E project were fan funded

On 31 January 2012, Sofia Talvik released her fifth album, "The Owls Are Not What They Seem" – a largely acoustic album featuring reworked versions of the new tracks from the L.O.V.E project. The title is taken from the TV show Twin Peaks by David Lynch.

Sofia Talvik embarked on her US tour "Drivin' & Dreaming" in December 2011. The tour went on for 18 months. In May 2012, Talvik did her 100th show on the tour at Pianos in New York City. Talvik released her first Daytrotter session on 21 September 2012 where she covered the song "Wichita Lineman" by Jimmy Webb and the song "So" an original by Talvik which was later released on her 2015 album, Big Sky Country.

In October 2013, Talvik released a book called Drivin' & Dreaming – One artist's odyssey through America about her U.S tour. She also released a live album, Drivin' & Dreaming LIVE with recordings made on the tour. Talvik released Big Sky Country, her sixth album with original songs partially inspired by long U.S tour, and a cover of Buffy Sainte-Marie's "Starwalker", in April 2015. A Christmas album called When Winter Comes was released in 2017. The album is a collection of 14 self written Christmas songs that Talvik has been releasing for free to her fans in the end of the year since several years back. Paws of a Bear is a studio album that was released in 2019, it features a lot of beautiful pedal steel played by Tim Fleming.

In August 2023, Talvik released Center of the Universe. With North Carolinian musicians Peyton Clifford and Drake Duffer on accordion, guitar, and mandolin, and Swede Janne Manninen on bass, the group recorded the album in a self-built studio in an old house in Sulegång, Sweden. Center of the Universe charted as no 14 on USA Folk Radio Charts in August 2023.

The album was considered for a Grammy nomination in the category Best Folk Album.

== Discography ==
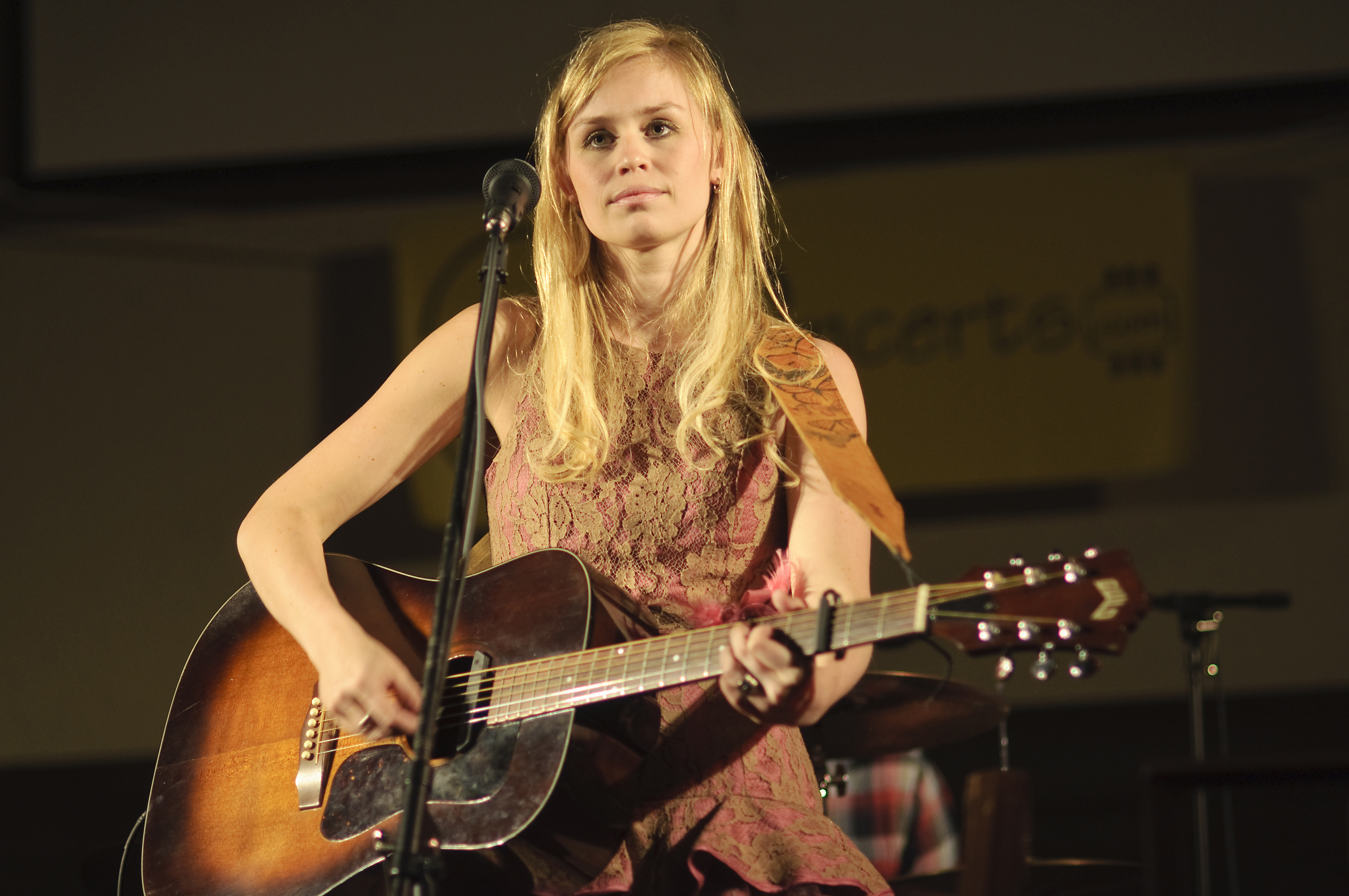
Sofia Talvik in 2010

=== Albums ===
- 2005 – Blue Moon
- 2007 – Street of Dreams
- 2007 – Street of Dreamix
- 2008 – Jonestown
- 2010 – Florida
- 2010 – Florida Acoustic
- 2012 – The Owls Are Not What They Seem
- 2013 – Drivin' & Dreaming LIVE
- 2015 – Big Sky Country
- 2016 – Acoustic (Florida, The Owls Are Not What They Seem, Big Sky Country)
- 2017 – When Winter Comes
- 2019 – Paws of a Bear
- 2020 - Paws of a Bear Unplugged
- 2023 - Center of the Universe

=== EPs ===
- February 2011 – L
- June 2011 – O
- September 2011 – V
- November 2011 – E
- March 2014 – Folk
