= Drivin' & Dreaming LIVE =

Live album by Sofia Talvik
- Released: 14 October 2013
- Genre: americana folk indie pop
- Length: 38:40
- Label: Makaki Music
- Producer: Sofia Talvik

Drivin' & Dreaming LIVE is an album by Sofia Talvik and was released 2013.

== Track listing ==
1. King Of The Willow Tree 02:56
2. When Winter Comes 03:48
3. Florida 02:30
4. The War 03:46
5. Cars 03:48
6. If I Had A Man 03:24
7. Uti vår hage 02:42
8. The Garden 03:50
9. Something Good 02:44
10. 7 Miles Wide 05:40
11. She's Leaving 03:32
