= All for the Love of Sunshine =

Single by Hank Williams Jr. with The Mike Curb Congregation

from the album All for the Love of Sunshine
- B-side: "Ballad Of The Moonshine"
- Released: July 1970
- Recorded: ca. April 1970
- Genre: Country
- Length: 3:47
- Label: MGM K 14152
- Songwriter(s): Mike Curb, Harley Hatcher and Lalo Schifrin
- Producer(s): Jim Vienneau

Hank Williams Jr. singles chronology
"Removing the Shadow" (1970)	"All for the Love of Sunshine" (1970)	"So Sad (To Watch Love Go Bad)" (1970)

"All for the Love of Sunshine" is a song written by music executive Mike Curb, Harley Hatcher and Lalo Schifrin, recorded by American country music singer Hank Williams Jr. The song went to number one on the Billboard Hot Country Singles chart in September 1970. Williams was backed by The Mike Curb Congregation on the song. It is featured prominently in the Clint Eastwood film Kelly's Heroes.

== Chart performance ==
Chart (1970)	Peak position
US Hot Country Songs (Billboard)	1
Canadian RPM Country Tracks	1
