= Blue Moon (Sofia Talvik album) =

Studio album by Sofia Talvik
- Released: 26 January 2005
- Genres: Americana; folk; indie pop
- Length: 38:09
- Label: Makaki Music
- Producer: Sofia Talvik

Sofia Talvik chronology
Blue Moon (2005)	Street of Dreams (2007)

Blue Moon is the debut studio album by Swedish folk musician Sofia Talvik. Released in 2005, the album took 40 hours to record, and received mostly positive reviews.

== Track listing ==
No.	Title	Length
1.	"Blue Moon"	3:05
2.	"Ghosts"	2:54
3.	"Stop"	3:14
4.	"Tonight"	2:48
5.	"Blue Highway"	3:00
6.	"Cars"	3:20
7.	"When Winter Comes"	3:16
8.	"Beautiful Naked"	2:55
9.	"Borderlines"	2:24
10.	"Odyssey"	2:49
11.	"Untradeable"	4:19
12.	"She's Leaving"	4:05
Total length:		38:09
